= List of people with surname Davis =

Davis is a common English-language surname.

== People ==
=== A ===
- Aaron Davis (disambiguation), multiple people
- Aasha Davis (born 1973), American actress
- Abel Davis (1874–1937), American officer
- Abraham Hopkins Davis (1796–1866), Australian businessman
- Abraham Lincoln Davis (1914–1978), American minister
- Adam Davis (disambiguation), multiple people
- Addie Elizabeth Davis (1917–2005), American religious leader
- Adelle Davis (1904–1974), American nutritionist
- Adrian Davis (disambiguation), multiple people
- Aidan Davis (born 1997), English rapper
- Aidon Davis (born 1994), South African rugby union footballer
- Aine Davis (born 1984), British criminal
- A. J. Davis (disambiguation), multiple people
- Akeem Davis (born 1989), American football player
- Al Davis (disambiguation), multiple people
- Alan Davis (disambiguation), multiple people
- Alana Davis (born 1974), American singer-songwriter
- Albert Davis (baseball), American baseball player
- Alexis Davis (fighter) (born 1984), Canadian mixed martial arts fighter
- Alfonza W. Davis (1919–1944), American pilot
- Alfred Davis, British entrepreneur
- Alicia Boler Davis, American engineer and businesswoman
- Alice Davis (disambiguation), multiple people
- Alistair Davis (sport shooter) (born 1992), South African Olympic sports shooter
- Allan Davis (disambiguation), multiple people
- Allen Davis (disambiguation), multiple people
- Allison Davis (disambiguation), multiple people
- Alonzo Davis (1942–2025), American artist and academic
- Alton Davis (born 1946), American judge
- Altovise Davis (1943–2009), American dancer
- Alvin Davis (born 1960), American baseball player
- Amanda Davis (disambiguation), multiple people
- Ambrose Davis (1863–1909), American baseball player
- Amos Davis (1794–1835), American politician
- Amos Hays Davis (1883–1962), American politician
- Amy Davis, American singer and artist
- Andra Davis (born 1978), American football player
- André Davis (born 1979), American football player
- Andre Davis (disambiguation), multiple people
- Andrew Davis (disambiguation), multiple people
- Angela Davis (disambiguation), multiple people
- Ann Davis (disambiguation), multiple people
- Anna Davis (born 2006), American amateur golfer
- Anna U Davis (born 1975), Swedish-American artist
- Annalee Davis (born 1963), Barbadian artist
- Anne-Christine Davis, British theoretical physicist
- Annett Davis (born 1973), American volleyball player
- Anthony Davis (disambiguation), multiple people
- Antoine Davis (born 1998), American basketball player
- Antone Davis (born 1967), American football player
- Antonio Davis (born 1968), American basketball player
- Antonio Davis (boxer) (born 1972), American boxer
- A. Porter Davis (1890–1970), American physician
- A. R. Davis (1924–1983), Australian academic
- Archie Davis (born 1998), British runner
- Ardie Davis (born 1941), American food writer
- Arlene Davis (1910–1964), American aviator
- Arnold Davis (American football) (born 1938), American football player
- Arrie W. Davis (born 1940), American lawyer
- Arron Davis (born 1972), English footballer
- Art Davis (disambiguation), multiple people
- Arthur Davis (disambiguation), multiple people
- Artur Davis (born 1967), American politician
- Ashlan Davis (born 1983), American football player
- Ashley E. Davis, American corporate executive
- Ashtyn Davis (born 1996), American football player
- Aubrey Davis (1921–1996), American basketball player
- Augustus P. Davis (1835–1899), American army officer
- Austin Davis (disambiguation), multiple people
- A. W. Davis (1943–2014), American basketball player and coach

=== B ===
- Babe Davis (1908–1981), American baseball player
- Bancroft Davis (1822–1907), American lawyer and diplomat
- Barbara Davis (born 1930), American social figure
- Barbara Anne Davis (1930–2008), American baseball player
- Baron Davis (born 1979), American basketball player
- Barry Davis (disambiguation), multiple people
- Bart Davis (born 1955), American politician
- B. B. Davis (born 1960), American basketball player
- Bear Davis, American lacrosse coach
- Beatrice Deloitte Davis (1909–1992), Australian editor
- Belinda Davis (born 1959), American historian
- Belle Davis (1874–1938), American choreographer
- Belva Davis (1932–2025), American journalist
- Ben Davis (disambiguation), multiple people
- Benjamin Davis (disambiguation), multiple people
- Bennie L. Davis (1928–2012), American general
- Benny Davis (1895–1979), American performer
- Bergen Davis (1869–1958), American physicist
- Bernadette Davis, British screenwriter
- Bernard Davis (disambiguation), multiple people
- Bert Davis (disambiguation), multiple people
- Beryl Davis (1924–2011), British-American vocalist
- Bette Davis (1908–1989), American actress
- Betty Davis (1944–2022), American singer-songwriter
- Bettye Davis (1938–2018), American politician
- Beulah Parson Davis (1896–1943), American fortune teller
- Beverley Davis (born 1957), American golfer
- Beverly A. Davis (1866–1944), American politician
- Bill Davis (disambiguation), multiple people
- Billie Davis (born 1944), British singer
- Billy Davis (disambiguation), multiple people
- Bing Davis (born 1937), American artist
- Blake Davis (disambiguation), multiple people
- Blevins Davis (1903–1971), American playwright
- Bliss N. Davis (1901–1885), American politician
- Bo Davis (born 1970), American football coach
- Bob Davis (disambiguation), multiple people
- Bonnie Davis (1920–1976), American singer
- Boo Boo Davis (born 1943), American musician
- Brad Davis (disambiguation), multiple people
- Bradley Moore Davis (1871–1957), American botanist
- Brandon Davis (born 1990), American mixed martial artist
- Brandy Davis (1927–2005), American baseball player
- Breanne Davis, American politician
- Brenda Davis (born 1959), Canadian dietitian and writer
- Brendon Davis (born 1997), American baseball player
- Brennen Davis (born 1999), American baseball player
- Brett Davis (born 1975), American politician
- Brett Davis (comedian), American comedian
- Brian Davis (disambiguation), multiple people
- Brianne Davis (born 1982), American actress
- Bridgett M. Davis, American writer
- Brielle Davis (born 1984), Australian singer
- Brinton B. Davis (1862–1952), American architect
- Brionne Davis (born 1976), American actor
- Britt Davis (born 1986), American football player
- Britton Davis (1860–1930), American soldier
- Brock Davis (born 1943), American baseball player
- Brooke Davis (writer) (born 1980), Australian writer
- Bruce Davis (disambiguation), multiple people
- Bryan Davis (disambiguation), multiple people
- Bryce Davis (born 1989), American football player
- Bud Davis (1895–1967), American baseball player
- Bunch Davis, American baseball player
- Burr Davis (born 1937), Canadian football player
- Buster Davis (disambiguation), multiple people
- Butch Davis (disambiguation), multiple people
- Byron Davis (born 1973), Australian squash player and coach

=== C ===
- Cade Davis (born 1988), American basketball player
- Caden Davis (born 2001), American football player
- Caleb Davis (1738–1797), American merchant
- Calvin Davis (1972–2023), American athlete
- Cameron Davis (disambiguation), multiple people
- Carey Davis (born 1981), American football player
- Carl Davis (disambiguation), multiple people
- Carlene Davis (born 1953), Jamaican gospel singer
- Carlene Davis (born 1953), Jamaican musician
- Carlos Davis (disambiguation), multiple people
- Carlton Davis (born 1996), American football player
- Carlton "Santa" Davis (born 1953), Jamaican musician
- Carol Davis (disambiguation), multiple people
- Carole Davis (born 1958), English actress
- Caroline Davis (publishing) (born 1964), British academic
- Caroline Davis (saxophonist) (born 1981), American saxophonist
- Carrie Davis (born 1976), English television presenter
- Carrie Chase Davis (1863–1953), American physician
- Casper Davis (born 1966), Vincentian cricketer
- Cassi Davis (born 1964), American actress
- Cassidy Davis (born 1994), Australian footballer
- Cassie Davis (born 1987), Australian singer-songwriter
- Catherine Davis (1924–2002), American poet
- Cathy Davis (born 1959), American boxer
- CeDell Davis (1926–2017), American guitarist
- Cerelyn J. Davis (born 1960), American police officer
- Chad Davis (disambiguation), multiple people
- Chandler Davis (1926–2022), American mathematician
- Chandra Davis (born 1978), American model
- Charles Davis (disambiguation), multiple people
- Charlie Davis (disambiguation), multiple people
- Chase Davis (born 2001), American baseball player
- Chauncey Davis (born 1983), American football player
- Chauncey Davis (politician) (1812–1888), American politician
- Chelsea Davis (born 1992), American gymnast
- Chester R. Davis (1896–1966), American businessman
- Chili Davis (born 1960), Jamaican-American baseball player
- Chip Davis (born 1947), American musician
- Chresten Davis (born 1975), New Zealand rugby union player
- Chris Davis (disambiguation), multiple people
- Christian Davis (born 1992), English cricketer
- Christina Davis (poet), American poet
- Christine Davis (born 1962), Canadian artist
- Christopher Davis (disambiguation), multiple people
- Chuck Davis (disambiguation), multiple people
- Cindy Davis (born 1977), American motocross racer
- C. J. Davis (born 1987), American football player
- C. J. Davis (wide receiver) (born 1969), Canadian football player
- Clarence Davis (born 1949), American football player
- Clarence "Tiger" Davis (born 1942), American politician
- Clarissa Davis (born 1967), American basketball player
- Clark Davis (disambiguation), multiple people
- Clarrie Davis (1928–2006), Australian rugby union footballer
- Claud M. Davis (1924–2020), American engineer and inventor
- Claude Davis (born 1979), Jamaican footballer
- Claude Davis (American football) (born 1989), American football player
- Cleo Davis (1919–1986), American musician
- Cliff Davis (1908–1990), American politician
- Clifford Davis (disambiguation), multiple people
- Clifton Davis (born 1945), American actor
- Clinton Davis (born 1965), American sprinter
- Clive Davis (disambiguation), multiple people
- Clyde Brion Davis (1894–1962), American author
- Cody Davis (born 1989), American football player
- Cole Davis (born 1997), Canadian rugby union footballer
- Colin Davis (disambiguation), multiple people
- Colleen Davis (born 1980), American politician
- Connor Davis (born 1994), American football player
- Corbett Davis (1914–1968), American football player
- Corey Davis (disambiguation), multiple people
- Corneal A. Davis (1900–1995), American politician
- Cornelia Cassady Davis (1870–1920), American painter
- Craig Davis (disambiguation), multiple people
- Crash Davis (1919–2001), American baseball player
- Crispin Davis (born 1949), British businessman
- Cristina Davis, engineering professor at UC Davis
- Curt Davis (1903–1965), American baseball player
- Cushman K. Davis (1838–1900), American politician
- Cynthia Davis (born 1959), American politician
- Cyprian Davis (1930–2015), American priest
- Cyrus W. Davis (1856–1917), American politician

=== D ===
- Daewood Davis (born 1999), American football player
- Dafydd Davis (born 1953), Welsh biker
- Dahlman Davis (1940–2024), American politician
- Dain Davis (born 1995), Indian actor
- Daisy Davis (1858–1902), American baseball player
- Dale Davis (disambiguation), multiple people
- Dalton Davis (born 1990), South African rugby union footballer
- Damon Davis (born 1985), American artist
- Dan Davis (disambiguation), multiple people
- Dana Davis (born 1978), American actress
- Dána-Ain Davis (born 1958), American professor
- Dane Davis (born 1950), American sound editor
- Daniel Davis (disambiguation), multiple people
- Danny Davis (disambiguation), multiple people
- Dantrell Davis (1985–1992), American victim of gang fighting
- Darnell Davis (born 1975), American musician
- Darrell Davis (born 1966), American football player
- Darren Davis (disambiguation), multiple people
- Darwin Davis (born 1993), American basketball player
- Daryl Davis (born 1958), American musician
- David Davis (disambiguation), multiple people
- Davion Davis (born 1996), American football player
- Davonte Davis (born 2001), American basketball player
- Dean Davis (born 1972), American politician
- Deane C. Davis (1900–1990), American politician
- Debbie McCune Davis (born 1951), American politician
- Deborah Davis (disambiguation), multiple people
- Debra Davis (born 1959), American politician
- Dedra Davis (born 1973), Bahamian athlete
- Dee Davis (born 1984), American basketball player
- Dee Davis (author) (born 1959), American author
- Dee Dee Davis (born 1996), American actress
- Deering Davis (1897–1965), American designer
- Deirdre Davis (born 1963), British actress
- Del Davis (disambiguation), multiple people
- Delamater Davis (1886–1966), American politician from Virginia
- Delano Davis (born 1995), Bahamian sprinter
- Delbert Davis (1883–1965), American poet
- Delbert Dwight Davis (1908–1965), American anatomist
- Delna Davis (born 1995), Indian actor
- Delores Ivory Davis (born 1939), American soprano
- Delos Davis (1846–1915), Canadian lawyer
- DeMane Davis (born 1967), American filmmaker
- Demario Davis (born 1989), American football player
- Dennis Davis (disambiguation), multiple people
- DeRay Davis (born 1968), American comedian
- Dereck E. Davis (born 1967), American politician
- Derek Davis (disambiguation), multiple people
- Derius Davis (born 2000), American football player
- Derone Davis (born 1992), West Indian cricketer
- Deshaun Davis (born 1995), American football player
- Desmond Davis (1926–2021), British actor
- Devante Davis (born 1992), American football player
- Devin Davis (disambiguation), multiple people
- Devra Davis (born 1946), American epidemiologist
- Dexter Davis (disambiguation), multiple people
- Deyonta Davis (born 1996), American basketball player
- Diana Davis (born 2003), American-Russian ice dancer
- Diane Davis (born 1963), American philosopher
- Dick Davis (disambiguation), multiple people
- Dickie Davis (disambiguation), multiple people
- Dik Davis, British musician
- Dime Davis (born 1985), American director and producer
- Dix Davis (1926–2024), American actor
- Dixie Davis (1905–1969), American lawyer
- Dixie Davis (baseball) (1890–1944), American baseball player
- D. J. Davis (baseball) (born 1994), American baseball player
- D'Mitch Davis (born 1941), American actor
- Dolly Davis (1896–1962), French actress
- Dolor Davis (1593–1673), American priest
- Domenique Davis (born 1996), American football player
- Dominique Davis (born 1989), American football player
- Donald Davis (disambiguation), multiple people
- Donn Davis, American venture capitalist
- Donna Davis (politician), Australian politician
- Donna P. Davis, American physician
- Donnie Davis (born 1972), American football player
- Dorathea Davis (1951–2005), American politician
- Doris A. Davis (born 1935), American politician
- Dorland J. Davis (1911–1990), American physician
- Dorothy Davis (disambiguation), multiple people
- Dorsett Davis (born 1979), American football player
- Douglas Davis (disambiguation), multiple people
- Dowayne Davis (born 1986), American football player
- Dre Davis (born 2001), American basketball player
- Drew Davis (born 1989), American football player
- Drexell R. Davis (1921–2009), American politician
- Duane Davis, American actor
- Dunbar Davis (1843–1923), American military officer
- Dusty Davis (born 1992), American racing driver
- Dwayne Davis (born 1989), American basketball player
- D. W. Davis (1873–1959), American politician
- Dwight Davis (disambiguation), multiple people

=== E ===
- Earl Davis (disambiguation), multiple people
- Ebonee Davis (born 1992), American model
- Ed Davis (disambiguation), multiple people
- Eddie Davis (disambiguation), multiple people
- Edgar Davis (disambiguation), multiple people
- Edith Davis (disambiguation), multiple people
- Edmond W. Davis (born 1976), American historian
- Edmund Davis (disambiguation), multiple people
- Edna Davis (1907–1989), Australian entertainer
- Eduardo Tejeira Davis (1951–2016), Panamanian architect
- Edward Davis (disambiguation), multiple people
- Edwards Davis (1873–1936), American actor
- Edwin Davis (disambiguation), multiple people
- Eisa Davis (born 1971), American playwright
- Elaine Davis (netball) (born 1976), Jamaican netball player
- Elaine Davis (politician) (born 1967), American politician
- Eldon Davis (1917–2011), American architect
- Eleanor Davis (born 1983), American cartoonist
- Eleanor Layfield Davis (1911–1985), American painter
- Eleanor R. Davis (1922–2020), American activist
- Elgin Davis (born 1965), American football player
- Elihu Davis (1851–1936), Canadian politician
- Eliot Davis (1871–1954), New Zealand politician
- Elise Davis, American musician
- Eliza Davis (1866–1931), English columnist
- Eliza Davis (letter writer) (1817–1903), English letter writer
- Eliza Van Benthuysen Davis (1811–1863), American planter and letter writer
- Elizabeth Davis (disambiguation), multiple people
- Ellabelle Davis (1907–1960), American singer
- Ellen Davis (disambiguation), multiple people
- Ellery L. Davis (1887–1956), American architect
- Elliot Davis (disambiguation), multiple people
- Elma Davis (1968–2019), South African lawn bowler
- Elmer Davis (1890–1958), American news reporter
- Emanual Davis (born 1968), American basketball player
- Emanuel Davis (born 1989), American football player
- Emilie Davis (1839–1889), American writer
- Emma Davis (born 1983), Irish triathlete
- Emma Lu Davis (1905–1988), American sculptor
- Emmett Davis (disambiguation), multiple people
- Enoch Douglas Davis (1908–1995), American writer
- Eoin Davis (born 2000), Irish hurler
- Eric Davis (disambiguation), multiple people
- Erik Davis (born 1967), American writer
- Erik Davis (baseball) (born 1986), American baseball player
- Erin Davis (born 1962), Canadian radio personality
- Erin Davis (actress) (born 1987), American actress
- Erin Davis (politician), American politician
- Ernest Davis (brewer) (1872–1962), New Zealand politician and brewer
- Ernie Davis (1939–1963), American football player
- Erroll Davis (1944–2026), American businessman
- Essie Davis (born 1970), Australian actress
- Ethel Davis (disambiguation), multiple people
- Eugene Davis (disambiguation), multiple people
- Eunice Davis (1800–1901), American abolitionist
- Evan Davis (disambiguation), multiple people
- Evelyn Y. Davis (1929–2018), American activist shareholder
- Everard Davis (1912–2005), English sprinter
- Ewin L. Davis (1876–1949), American politician

=== F ===
- F. A. Davis (1850–1917), American publisher
- Fabian Davis (born 1974), Jamaican footballer
- Fay Davis (1872–1945), American actress
- Fay E. Davis (1916–1997), American artist
- Felecia Davis, American architect
- Felix Davis (1869–1950), English footballer
- F. Elwood Davis (1915–2012), American lawyer
- Fiona Davis (born 1966), Canadian author
- Florence A. Davis, American entrepreneur
- Floyd Davis (1909–1977), American stock car racing driver
- Floyd MacMillan Davis (1896–1966), American painter
- Forest Davis (1879–1959), American politician
- Frances Davis (1882–1965), American nurse
- Frances Taylor Davis (1929–2018), American dancer
- Francis Davis (disambiguation), multiple people
- Frank Davis (disambiguation), multiple people
- Franklin Davis (disambiguation), multiple people
- Fred Davis (disambiguation), multiple people
- Freeman Davis (soldier) (1842–1899), American soldier
- Frenchie Davis (born 1979), American singer

=== G ===
- Gabe Davis (born 1999), American football player
- Gabrielle Davis (born 1941), British sheriff
- Gail Davis (1925–1997), American actress
- Gaines Davis (1913–1983), American football player
- Galen Davis (1951–2005), American politician
- Gareth Davis (born 1950), British businessman
- Garrett Davis (1801–1872), American politician
- Garrick Davis (born 1971), American poet
- Garry Davis (1921–2013), American activist
- Garry Davis (boxer) (born 1947), Bahamian boxer
- Garth Davis (born 1974), Australian film director
- Garth Davis (surgeon) (born 1970), American surgeon
- Gary Davis (disambiguation), multiple people
- Gavin Davis (born 1977), South African politician
- Geater Davis (1946–1984), American singer-songwriter
- Geena Davis (born 1956), American actress
- Geffrey Davis (born 1983), American poet
- Gene Davis (disambiguation), multiple people
- Genese Davis (born 1984), American novelist
- Geoff Davis (disambiguation), multiple people
- George Davis (disambiguation), multiple people
- Georgia Davis (born 1999), English cricketer
- Georgia-May Davis (born 1995), Australian actress
- Georgiann Davis, American sociologist
- Georgie Davis (born 1969), Dutch singer
- Georgina A. Davis (1852–1901), American illustrator
- Gerald Davis (disambiguation), multiple people
- Gerard Davis (born 1977), New Zealand footballer
- Geremy Davis (born 1992), American football player
- Geron Davis (born 1964), American musician
- Gerry Davis (disambiguation), multiple people
- Gervonta Davis (born 1994), American boxer
- Gherardi Davis (1858–1941), American politician
- Girvies Davis (1958–1995), American serial killer
- Gladys Davis (disambiguation), multiple people
- Glen Davis (disambiguation), multiple people
- Glenn Davis (disambiguation), multiple people
- G. Lindsey Davis (born 1948), American bishop
- Gloria Davis (disambiguation), multiple people
- Glyn Davis (born 1959), Australian academic administrator
- Glynn Davis (born 1991), American baseball player
- Goldie Davis (fl. 1920s), American baseball player
- Gordon Davis (born 1941), American lawyer
- Gordon Davis (rugby union) (1925–1999), Australian rugby union footballer
- Grace Montañez Davis (1926–2020), American politician
- Graeme Davis (disambiguation), multiple people
- Graham Davis (born 1953), Fijian-Australian journalist
- Graham Davis (racing driver), British racing driver
- Grahame Davis, New Zealand footballer
- Grania Davis (1943–2017), American writer
- Gray Davis (born 1942), American politician
- Greg Davis (disambiguation), multiple people
- Gronow Davis (1828–1891), British general
- Gussie Davis (1863–1899), American songwriter
- Gussie Nell Davis (1906–1993), American teacher
- Guy Davis (disambiguation), multiple people
- Gwen Davis (born 1936), American novelist
- Gwenda Louise Davis (1911–1993), Australian botanist

=== H ===
- H. A. Davis (1879–1946), American politician
- Hal Davis (1933–1998), American songwriter
- Hall Davis (born 1987), American football player
- Hallowell Davis (1896–1992), American physiologist
- Hannah Davis (disambiguation), multiple people
- Hardie Davis (born 1968), American politician
- Harper Davis (1925–2020), American football player
- Harrison Davis (born 1952), American football player
- Harold Davis (disambiguation), multiple people
- Harry Davis (disambiguation), multiple people
- Hart Davis (1791–1854), British politician
- Harvey Davis (born 1953), Australian rules footballer
- Harvey N. Davis (1881–1952), American engineer
- Harwell Goodwin Davis (1882–1977), American lawyer
- Hasbrouck Davis (1827–1870), American general
- Hayley Davis (born 1993), English golfer
- Hayward Davis (1928–2014), American politician
- Heath Davis (born 1971), New Zealand cricketer
- Heath Davis (director), Australian film director
- Heather Davis (born 1974), Canadian rower
- Helen Gordon Davis (1926–2015), American actress and politician from Florida
- Helen Sellers Davis (1912–2008), American architect
- Helga Davis, American artist
- Henrietta Davis (disambiguation), multiple people
- Henry Davis (disambiguation), multiple people
- Herbert Davis (disambiguation), multiple people
- Herman Davis (1888–1923), American soldier
- Herndon Davis (1901–1962), American artist
- Hester A. Davis (1930–2014), American archaeologist
- Hezekiah Davis (??–1837), American politician
- H. G. Davis Jr. (1924–2004), American educator
- Hilda Andrea Davis (1905–2001), American educator
- H. L. Davis (1894–1960), American novelist and poet
- Holland Archer Davis (1869–1955), American philatelist
- Homer Davis, Jamaican politician
- Hope Davis (born 1964), American actress
- Hope Hale Davis (1903–2004), American columnist
- Horace Davis (1831–1916), American politician
- Horace B. Davis (1898–1999), American journalist
- Horatio N. Davis (1812–1907), American politician
- Horrie Davis (1889–1960), Australian cricketer
- Houston Davis (1914–1987), American composer
- Howard Davis (disambiguation), multiple people
- Howell Davis (1690–1719), Welsh pirate
- Howie Davis, American sports executive
- Hubert Davis (disambiguation), multiple people

=== I ===
- Ian Davis (disambiguation), multiple people
- Ida May Davis (1857–??), American litterateur
- Ike Davis (born 1987), American baseball player
- Ike Davis (shortstop) (1895–1984), American baseball player
- Ilan Davis, British biochemist
- Ilus W. Davis (1917–1996), American politician
- Ira Davis (disambiguation), multiple people
- Iris Davis (1950–2021), American sprinter
- Iron Davis (1890–1961), American baseball player
- Irving Davis (1896–1958), American soccer player
- Irving Gilman Davis (1885–1939), American economist and educator
- Irwin Davis, American athletic administrator
- Isaac Davis (disambiguation), multiple people
- Isaiah Davis (born 2002), American football player
- Ishmael Davis (born 1995), English professional boxer
- Ivan Davis (1932–2018), American pianist
- Ivan Davis (politician) (1937–2020), Northern Ireland politician

=== J ===
- Jack Davis (disambiguation), multiple people
- Jacke Davis (1936–2021), American baseball player
- Jackie Davis (disambiguation), multiple people
- Jackson Davis (disambiguation), multiple people
- Jacob Davis (disambiguation), multiple people
- Jaden Davis (born 2001), American football player
- Jadyn Davis (born 2005), American football player
- Ja'Gared Davis (born 1990), American football player
- Jake Davis (disambiguation), multiple people
- Jalani Davis (born 2001), American track athlete
- Jalen Davis (born 1996), American football player
- Jamal Davis II (born 1995), American football player
- Jamar Davis (born 1984), American basketball player
- Jamelia Davis (born 1981), British singer
- James Davis (disambiguation), multiple people
- Jamin Davis (born 1998), American football player
- Jan Davis (born 1953), American astronaut
- Janet Davis, Canadian politician
- Janette Davis (1916–2005), American singer
- Jarrad Davis (born 1994), American football player
- Jason Davis (disambiguation), multiple people
- Javaris Davis (born 1996), American football player
- Jawill Davis (born 1995), American football player
- Jaxson Davis (born 2009), American basketball player
- Jay Davis (born 1970), American baseball player
- Jaylin Davis (born 1994), American baseball player
- Jayme Davis, American politician
- J. C. Davis (1940–2021), British historian
- J. C. Davis (American football) (born 2003), American football player
- J. C. Séamus Davis (born 1960), Irish physicist
- JD Davis (born 1973), Belgian musician
- J. D. Davis (born 1993), American baseball player
- Jeanette Davis (born 1985), American microbiologist
- Jeannemarie Devolites Davis (born 1956), American politician
- Jean-Paul Davis (born 1972), Canadian ice hockey player
- Jed Davis (musician) (born 1975), American musician
- Jed Davis (politician), American politician
- Jeff Davis (disambiguation), multiple people
- Jefferson Davis (1808–1889), American politician
- Jefferson C. Davis (1828–1879), American general
- Jehu Davis (1738–1802), American politician
- J. Elwood Davis (1892–1974), American football player and coach
- Jenna Davis (born 2004), American actress
- Jennifer Pharr Davis (born 1983), American hiker
- Jenny Davis (born 1982), British bicycle racer
- Jenny L. Davis (born 1982), American anthropologist
- Jeral Davis (born 1984), American basketball player
- Jeremiah Davis (1826–1910), American pioneer
- Jeremy Davis (born 1985), American musician
- Jerome Davis (disambiguation), multiple people
- Jerry Davis (disambiguation), multiple people
- Jess H. Davis (1906–1971), American academic administrator
- Jesse Davis (disambiguation), multiple people
- Jessica Davis (born 1978), American rhythmic gymnast
- Jessica Davis (bobsledder) (born 1992), American bobsledder
- Jessie Bartlett Davis (1860–1905), American singer
- J. G. Davis, American football player
- J. Gunnis Davis (1873–1937), British-American actor
- Jill Davis (born 1966), American author
- Jill Davis (tennis) (born 1960), American tennis player
- Jim Davis (disambiguation), multiple people
- Jimmie Davis (1899–2000), American singer and politician
- Jimmy Davis (disambiguation), multiple people
- J. J. Davis (born 1978), American baseball player
- J. L. Davis (1874–??), Irish rugby union footballer
- J. Mac Davis (born 1952), American lawyer
- Jo Ann Davis (1950–2007), American politician
- Joan Davis (1907–1961), American actress
- Joan Davis (cricketer) (1911–2004), Welsh cricketer
- Jodie Davis (born 1966), Australian cricketer
- Jody Davis (baseball) (born 1956), American baseball player
- Joe Davis (disambiguation), multiple people
- Joel Davis (born 1965), American baseball player
- Joey Davis (born 1993), American mixed martial artist
- John Davis (disambiguation), multiple people
- Johnathan Davis (disambiguation), multiple people
- Johnell Davis (born 2001), American basketball player
- Johnny Davis (disambiguation), multiple people
- Jon Davis (disambiguation), multiple people
- Jonas Davis (1859–1911), Australian cricketer
- Jonathan Davis (disambiguation), multiple people
- Jordan Davis (disambiguation), multiple people
- Jose Davis (born 1978), American football player
- Joseph Davis (disambiguation), multiple people
- Joshua Davis (disambiguation), multiple people
- Josie Davis (born 1973), American actress
- Joslyn Davis (born 1982), American television host
- J. P. Davis (1900–??), American screenwriter
- J. R. Davis (1882–1947), American football player
- J. Steward Davis (1890–1929), American lawyer and activist
- Judd Davis (born 1973), American football player
- Judy Davis (born 1955), Australian actress
- Julia Davis (disambiguation), multiple people
- Julie Davis (born 1969), American actor
- Julie Hirschfeld Davis (born 1975), American politician
- Julienne Davis (born 1973), American actress
- Jumbo Davis (1861–1921), American baseball player
- Justin Davis (disambiguation), multiple people
- Justine Davis, Australian politician
- J. William Davis (born 1908), American professor

=== K ===
- Kaden Davis (born 1998), American football player
- Kaela Davis (born 1995), American basketball player
- Kaitlyn Davis (born 2001), American basketball player
- Kalia Davis (born 1998), American football player
- Kane Davis (born 1975), American baseball player
- Kanorris Davis (born 1990), American football player
- Karen Davis (disambiguation), multiple people
- Karl Davis (1962–1987), American fashion designer
- Karl Davis (actor) (1908–1977), American professional wrestler
- Karlene Davis (born 1946), British medical executive
- Karon Davis (born 1977), American visual artist
- Kate Embry Dowdle Davis (1871–1954), American historian and clubwoman
- Katharine Bement Davis (1860–1935), American political reformer
- Kathryn Davis (disambiguation), multiple people
- Kathy Davis (born 1956), American politician
- Kathy Davis (sociologist) (born 1949), American sociologist
- Katie Davis (disambiguation), multiple people
- Kay Davis (1920–2012), American singer
- Keeley Davis (born 1976), American musician
- Keeley Davis (rugby league) (born 2000), Australian rugby league footballer
- Keenan Davis (born 1991), American football player
- Keinan Davis (born 1998), English footballer
- Keionta Davis (born 1994), American football player
- Keith Davis (disambiguation), multiple people
- Kellen Davis (born 1985), American football player
- Kelly Davis (born 1958), Canadian ice hockey player
- Kelly Davis (reporter), American reporter
- Kelsey Davis (born 1987), American soccer player
- Kelvin Davis (disambiguation), multiple people
- Kendric Davis (born 1999), American basketball player
- Kenn Davis (1932–2010), American artist
- Kenneth Davis (disambiguation), multiple people
- Keno Davis (born 1972), American basketball coach
- Kentrail Davis (born 1988), American baseball player
- Kenturah Davis (born 1980), American artist
- Kermit Davis (born 1959), American basketball coach
- Kerry Davis (born 1962), English footballer
- Kertus Davis (born 1981), American racing driver
- Kevin Davis (disambiguation), multiple people
- Kevona Davis (born 2001), Jamaican sprinter
- Keyshawn Davis (born 1999), American boxer
- Khalil Davis (born 1996), American football player
- Khris Davis (born 1987), American baseball player
- Khris Davis (actor) (born 1987), American actor
- Kia Davis (born 1976), Liberian-American sprinter
- Kiddo Davis (1902–1983), American baseball player
- Kim Davis (disambiguation), multiple people
- Kingsley Davis (1908–1997), American sociologist
- Kira Davis, American film producer
- Kiri Davis, American filmmaker
- Knile Davis (born 1991), American football player
- Kris Davis (born 1980), Canadian musician
- Kristin Davis (born 1965), American actress
- Kristin M. Davis (born 1977), American prostitute
- Krystal Davis, American musician
- Kyle Davis (disambiguation), multiple people
- Kyra Davis (born 1972), American novelist

=== L ===
- Lacy J. Davis, American writer
- LaDeva Davis (1944–2022), American television personality
- Lagueria Davis, American film director
- Lamar Davis (1921–2014), football player
- Lance Davis (born 1976), American baseball player
- Lance E. Davis (1928–2014), American economic historian
- Lanny Davis (born 1945), American political operative
- Larry Davis (disambiguation), multiple people
- Laura Davis (disambiguation), multiple people
- Lauren Davis (disambiguation), multiple people
- Laurence Davis (1930–1974), South African cricketer
- LaVan Davis (born 1966), American actor
- Lavinia R. Davis (1909–1961), American author
- LC Davis (born 1980), American martial artist
- L. Clifford Davis (1924–2025), American attorney
- Leanne Davis (born 1985), English cricketer
- Lee Davis (born 1945), American basketball player
- Leeon D. Davis (1930–2007), American aircraft designer
- Lefty Davis (1875–1919), American baseball player
- Legh Davis (1940–2026), Australian politician
- Legrome D. Davis (born 1952), American judge
- Leif Davis (born 1999), English footballer
- Leigh Davis (poet) (1955–2009), New Zealand writer
- Leighton I. Davis (1910–1995), American lieutenant general
- Leland Davis, American baseball player
- Lem Davis (1914–1970), American saxophonist
- Lemuel Davis (born 1953), American software engineer
- Len Davis (born 1964), American police officer
- Lennard J. Davis (born 1949), English professor
- Leo Davis (born 1992), South African sailor
- Leodis Davis (born 1933), American chemist
- Leon Davis (disambiguation), multiple people
- Leonard Davis (disambiguation), multiple people
- Les Davis (1900–1966), American football coach
- Les Davis (American football) (1937–2007), American football player and coach
- Lester Thomas Davis (1904–1952), American politician
- Levi Davis (disambiguation), multiple people
- Lew Davis (1884–1948), American actor
- Lex Scott Davis (born 1991), American actress
- Lexi Davis (born 1994), American softball coach
- Liam Davis (disambiguation), multiple people
- Lisa Davis (disambiguation), multiple people
- Lincoln Davis (born 1943), American politician
- Linda Davis (born 1962), American singer
- Linda Mitchell Davis (1930–2024), American cowgirl
- Lindsay Davis (disambiguation), multiple people
- Lindsey Davis (born 1949), British author
- Linsey Davis (born 1971), American journalist
- Lionel Davis (born 1936), South African artist
- L. J. Davis (1940–2011), American novelist
- Lloyd E. Davis (1899–1955), American farmer and politician
- Lloyd Spencer Davis (born 1954), New Zealand author
- Lockyer John Davis (1717–1791), English bookseller
- Lorne Davis (1930–2007), Canadian ice hockey player
- Lou Davis (1881–1961), American songwriter
- Louis Davis (disambiguation), multiple people
- Lowndes H. Davis (1836–1920), American politician
- Lucinda Davis (1848–1937), American slave
- Lucinda Davis (actress) (born 2000), American actress
- Lucius Davis (born 1970), American basketball player
- Lucy Davis (born 1973), British actress
- Lucy Davis (equestrian) (born 1992), American equestrian
- Lula J. Davis, American politician
- Luther Davis (1916–2008), American writer
- Luther Davis (American football), American football player
- Lydia Davis (born 1947), American writer
- Lydia Davis (Cook Islands writer) (1919–2000), British writer
- Lyn Davis (1943–2008), New Zealand rugby union footballer
- Lynn Davis (disambiguation), multiple people

=== M ===
- Mac Davis (1942–2020), American singer-songwriter
- Mackenzie Davis (born 1987), Canadian actress
- Madeline Davis (1940–2021), American activist
- Madi Davis (born 1999), American singer-songwriter
- Madison Davis (1833–1902), American slave
- Madlyn Davis, American singer
- Maggie Davis, British political figure
- Major Davis (1882–1959), English cricketer
- Mal Davis (born 1956), Canadian ice hockey player
- Malachi Davis (born 1977), American sprinter
- Malcolm Davis (1899–1977), American ornithologist
- Malik Davis (born 1998), American football player
- Mana Hira Davis (born 1901), New Zealand stuntman
- Manvel H. Davis (1891–1959), American politician
- Mara Davis (born 1959), American radio personality
- Marc Davis (disambiguation), multiple people
- Marchánt Davis (born 1990), American actor
- Marcus Davis (born 1973), American mixed martial artist
- Marcus Davis (American football) (born 1989), American football player
- Margaret Davis (disambiguation), multiple people
- Margo Davis (born 1944), American photographer
- Marguerite Davis (1887–1967), American biochemist
- Marguerite Sawyer Davis (1879–1948), American socialite
- Maria Ragland Davis (1959–2010), American biologist
- Marianna Davis (born 1972), American politician
- Marianna W. Davis (1929–2021), American author
- Mark Davis (disambiguation), multiple people
- Marlon Davis (disambiguation), multiple people
- Marquesha Davis (born 2001), American basketball player
- Marsh Davis, American politician
- Martha Davis (disambiguation), multiple people
- Martin Davis (disambiguation), multiple people
- Marty Davis (born 1949), American journalist
- Marvin Davis (1925–2004), American businessman
- Marvin Davis (Canadian football) (born 1952), American football player
- Mary Davis (disambiguation), multiple people
- Marybeth Davis (born 1952), American nurse and criminal
- Masen Davis (born 1971), American activist
- Mati Hlatshwayo Davis (born 1982), Zimbabwean-American physician
- Matt Davis (ice hockey) (born 2001), Canadian ice hockey player
- Matthew Davis (disambiguation), multiple people
- Mattie Belle Davis (1910–2004), American judge
- Maura Davis, American singer
- Maurice Davis (1921–1993), American rabbi
- Maury Davis, American pastor
- Max Davis (born 1950), New Zealand footballer
- Max Leroy Davis (born 1945), Australian bishop
- Maximilian Davis (born 1995), British fashion designer
- Maxwell Davis (1916–1970), American saxophonist
- Mike Davis (1945–1986), American actor, model, art director, and set designer
- May Davis (1914–1995), English-New Zealand potter
- Meg Davis (born 1953), American singer-songwriter
- Megan Davis (born 1975), Australian activist
- Mel Davis (born 1950), American basketball player
- Melissa Davis, American voice actress
- Melvin Lee Davis, American bass player
- Mendel Jackson Davis (1942–2007), American attorney
- Meredith Davis (born 1948), American educator
- Meryl Davis (born 1987), American ice dancer
- Meyer Davis (musician) (1892–1976), American musician
- Michael Davis (disambiguation), multiple people
- Michaela Angela Davis (born 1964), American writer
- Michelle Davis (disambiguation), multiple people
- Michellene Davis (born 1971), American politician and executive
- Mick Davis (born 1958), British politician
- Mickey Davis (born 1950), American basketball player
- Miguel Davis (born 1966), Costa Rican footballer
- Mildred Davis (1901–1969), American actress
- Mildred B. Davis (born 1930), American novelist
- Mikaela Davis (born 1992), American musician
- Mike Davis (disambiguation), multiple people
- Miles Davis (1926–1991), American trumpeter
- Miles Dewey Davis Jr. (1898–1962), American dentist
- Millard Davis (1883–1957), American lawyer
- Millie Davis (born 2006), Canadian actress
- Milt Davis (1929–2008), American football player
- Milton Davis, American musician
- Milton C. Davis, American lawyer
- Minnie S. Davis (1835–1927), American author
- Miriam Isabel Davis (1856–1927), English painter
- Miss Davis (1726–1755), Irish singer
- Mitch Davis (born 2000), American film director
- Mo'ne Davis (born 2001), American baseball and softball player
- Moe Davis (born 1958), American colonel
- Moll Davis (1648–1708), English courtesan
- Mollie C. Davis (1932–2021), American activist
- Mollie Evelyn Moore Davis (1844–1909), American poet
- Molly Davis (born 2000), American basketball player
- Mondoe Davis (born 1982), American football player
- Monique D. Davis (born 1936), American educator
- Monnett Bain Davis (1893–1953), American diplomat
- Monte Hill Davis (1932–2018), American pianist
- Monti Davis (1958–2013), American basketball player
- Morgan Davis (born 1901), Canadian musician
- Morris Davis (composer) (1904–1968), Canadian composer
- Morry Davis (1894–1985), British politician
- Mortimer Davis (1866–1928), Canadian businessman
- Moses M. Davis (1820–1888), American politician
- Moshe Davis (1916–1996), American rabbi and historian
- Mouse Davis (born 1932), American football player
- Myron Davis (1919–2010), American photojournalist

=== N ===
- Nancy Davis (businesswoman) (born 1977), American businesswoman
- Natalie Zemon Davis (1928–2023), Canadian-American historian
- Nate Davis (disambiguation), multiple people
- Nathan Davis (disambiguation), multiple people
- Nathaniel Davis (disambiguation), multiple people
- Ned Davis (disambiguation), multiple people
- Neil Davis (disambiguation), multiple people
- Nellie Verrill Mighels Davis (1844–1945), American journalist
- Nelson Davis (disambiguation), multiple people
- Nic Davis, American filmmaker
- Nicholas Davis Jr. (1825–1875), American politician
- Nick Davis (disambiguation), multiple people
- Nicolaus Davis (1883–1967), Greek painter
- Nicole Davis (born 1982), American volleyball player
- Nigel Davis (born 1951), English politician
- Niki Davis, New Zealand computer scientist
- Nina Davis (basketball) (born 1994), American basketball player
- Noah Davis (disambiguation), multiple people
- Noel Davis (1927–2002), British actor
- Noel Denholm Davis (1876–1950), English artist
- Noor Davis (born 1994), American football player
- Norbert Davis (1909–1949), American author
- Nore Davis (born 1984), American comedian
- Norm Davis (1904–1966), Australian rules footballer
- Norma Davis (1905–1945), Australian poet
- Norman Davis (disambiguation), multiple people

=== O ===
- Odie Davis (born 1955), American baseball player
- Olea Marion Davis (1899–1977), Canadian artist and craftsperson
- Olena Kalytiak Davis (born 1963), American poet
- Oliver Davis (disambiguation), multiple people
- Omolyn Davis (born 1987), Jamaican footballer
- Oran B. Davis (1872–1960), Canadian politician
- Orbert Davis (born 1960), American trumpeter
- Oscar Davis (disambiguation), multiple people
- Ossie Davis (1917–2005), American actor
- Otho Davis, American athletic trainer
- Otis Davis (1932–2024), American athlete
- Otis Davis (baseball) (1920–2007), American baseball player
- Owen Davis (1874–1956), American dramatist
- Owen Davis Jr. (1907–1949), American actor

=== P ===
- Padraic Davis (born 1975), Irish Gaelic footballer
- Pahl Davis (1897–1946), American football player
- Paige Davis (born 1969), American actress
- Pamela Davis (disambiguation), multiple people
- Paris Davis (born 1939), American army officer
- Parke H. Davis (1871–1934), American football player
- Parker S. Davis (1863–1955), American politician
- Paschall Davis (born 1969), American football player
- Pat Davis (born 1956), American dancer
- Patricia V. Davis (born 1956), American novelist
- Patrick Davis (disambiguation), multiple people
- Patti Davis (born 1952), American actress
- Paul Davis (disambiguation), multiple people
- Paula Davis (born 1973), American politician
- Paulina Wright Davis (1813–1876), American activist
- Pauline Davis (disambiguation), multiple people
- Peaches Davis (1905–1995), American baseball player
- Peanuts Davis (1917–1952), American baseball player
- Percival Davis, American author
- Percy Davis (disambiguation), multiple people
- Pernell Davis (born 1976), American football player
- Peter Davis (disambiguation), multiple people
- Phil Davis (disambiguation), multiple people
- Philern Davis (born 1982), West Indian cricketer
- Philip Davis (disambiguation), multiple people
- Phineas Davis (1792–1835), American inventor
- Phyllis Davis (1940–2013), American actress
- Pierpont Davis (1884–1953), American architect and Olympic gold medalist
- Piper Davis (1917–1997), American baseball player
- P. O. Davis (1890–1973), American educator
- Preacher Davis, American baseball player
- Preston Davis (disambiguation), multiple people

=== Q ===
- Quack Davis, American baseball player
- Quartney Davis (born 1998), American football player
- Quincy Davis (disambiguation), multiple people
- Quinshad Davis (born 1994), American football player
- Quint Davis (born 1947), American record producer

=== R ===
- Rachel Davis (musician), Canadian musician
- Rachel Darden Davis (1905–1979), American politician and physician
- Raekwon Davis (born 1997), American football player
- Rainy Davis, American songwriter
- Rajai Davis (born 1980), American baseball player
- Ralph Davis (disambiguation), multiple people
- Randall William Davis (born 1952), American educator
- Randy Davis (born 1952), American politician
- Raphael Davis (born 1976), American mixed martial artist
- Rashad Davis (born 1996), Bahamian basketballer
- Rashard Davis (born 1995), American football player
- Rashied Davis (born 1979), American football player
- Raven Davis (born 1975), American artist
- Ray Davis (disambiguation), multiple people
- Raymond Davis (disambiguation), multiple people
- R. Carey Davis, American politician
- Rebecca Davis (disambiguation), multiple people
- Rece Davis (born 1965), American anchor
- Red Davis (disambiguation), multiple people
- Redd Davis (1896–??), Canadian film director
- Reginald Davis (disambiguation), multiple people
- Renn Davis (1928–1997), British colonial administrator
- Rennia Davis (born 1999), American basketball player
- Rennie Davis (1940–2021), American activist
- Reshawn Davis (born 1972), American bodyguard
- Reuben Davis (disambiguation), multiple people
- Rex Davis (1890–1951), British soldier
- Rex D. Davis (1924–2008), American police officer
- R. H. C. Davis (1918–1991), British historian
- Rich Davis (1926–2015), American businessman
- Richard Davis (disambiguation), multiple people
- Richie Davis (Canadian football) (born 1945), American football player
- Richie Davis (musician) (born 1957), American guitarist
- Rick Davis (born 1958), American soccer player
- Rick Davis (political consultant) (born 1957), American political consultant
- Ricky Davis (born 1979), American basketball player
- Ricky Davis (American football) (born 1953), American football player
- R. J. Davis (born 2001), American basketball player
- Rob Davis (disambiguation), multiple people
- Robbie Davis (born 1961), American jockey
- Robert Davis (disambiguation), multiple people
- Robin Davis (born 1956), American judge
- Robin Davis (director) (born 1943), French film director
- Rock Davis (1833–1904), Australian shipbuilder
- Rod Davis (disambiguation), multiple people
- Rodger Davis (born 1951), Australian golfer
- Rodney Davis (disambiguation), multiple people
- Roland Clark Davis (1902–1961), American psychologist
- Roger Davis (disambiguation), multiple people
- Roman Griffin Davis (born 2007), English actor
- Romanzo E. Davis (1831–1908), American farmer
- Romay Davis (1919–2024), American soldier
- Ronald Davis (disambiguation), multiple people
- Ronnie Davis (1950–2017), Jamaican singer
- Rookie Davis (born 1993), American baseball player
- Rose May Davis (1894–1985), American chemist
- Rosey Davis (born 1941), American football player
- Rosey Davis (baseball) (1904–1968), American baseball player
- Ross Davis (disambiguation), multiple people
- Rowena Davis (born 1964/1965), New Zealand gymnast
- Rowenna Davis (born 1985), English journalist
- Rowland L. Davis (1871–1954), American judge
- Rowland Robert Teape Davis (c.1807–1879), New Zealand labour reformer
- Roy Davis (disambiguation), multiple people
- Royden B. Davis (1923–2002), American academic administrator
- Rufe Davis (1908–1974), American actor
- Rufus Davis (born 1964), American activist
- Russ Davis (born 1969), American baseball player
- Russell Davis (disambiguation), multiple people
- Ruth Davis (disambiguation), multiple people
- Ruthie Davis, American businesswoman
- Ryan Davis (disambiguation), multiple people

=== S ===
- S. S. Davis (1817–1896), American politician
- Sam Davis (disambiguation), multiple people
- Sammi Davis (born 1964), British actress
- Sammy Davis (disambiguation), multiple people
- Samuel Davis (disambiguation), multiple people
- Sarah Davis (disambiguation), multiple people
- Saul Davis (1901–1994), American baseball player
- Scot Davis, American wrestling coach
- Scott Davis (disambiguation), multiple people
- Sean Davis (disambiguation), multiple people
- Sebastian Davis (born 1980 or 1981), American YouTuber
- Seth Davis (born 1970), American sportswriter
- Shaheed Davis (born 1994), American basketball player
- Shane Davis (born 1950), American comic book artist
- Shane Davis (astrophysicist), American astrophysicist
- Shani Davis (born 1982), American speed skater
- Shaquan Davis (American football) (born 2000), American football player
- Shardé M. Davis, American academic
- Sharen Davis (born 1957), American costume designer
- Sharon Davis (disambiguation), multiple people
- Shaun Davis (1966–2023), British bodybuilder
- Shawn Davis (American football) (born 1997), American football player
- Shayla Davis, American politician
- Sheana Davis (born 1969), American cheesemaker
- Shelby Davis (disambiguation), multiple people
- Shelley Davis (1952–2008), American attorney
- Shelly Boshart Davis (born 1980), American politician
- Shelton H. Davis (1942–2010), American anthropologist
- Sherman Davis, American baseball player
- Sherry Davis, American sports announcer
- Shockmain Davis (born 1977), American football player
- Sid Davis (1916–2006), American film director
- Simon Davis (disambiguation), multiple people
- Skeeter Davis (1931–2004), American singer
- Sol Davis (born 1979), English footballer
- Sonny Davis (born 1948), American football player
- Spanky Davis (1943–2010), American trumpeter
- Spencer Davis (disambiguation), multiple people
- Spike Davis (born 1990), American rugby union footballer
- Spud Davis (1904–1984), American baseball player
- St. James Davis (1943–2018), American automobile racer
- Stan Davis (disambiguation), multiple people
- Stanton Davis (1945–2026), American jazz trumpeter and educator
- Steel Arm Davis (1891–1941), American baseball player
- Steph Davis (born 1973), American rock climber
- Stephanie Davis (disambiguation), multiple people
- Stephen Davis (disambiguation), multiple people
- Sterling Davis (born 1977), American basketball player
- Steve Davis (disambiguation), multiple people
- Steven Davis (disambiguation), multiple people
- Storm Davis (born 1961), American baseball player
- Stringer Davis (1899–1973), British actor
- Stu Davis (1921–2007), Canadian singer
- Stuart Davis (disambiguation), multiple people
- Susan Davis (disambiguation), multiple people
- Suzanne Davis (disambiguation), multiple people
- Syd Davis (1930–2016), Australian rules footballer
- Sydney Davis (disambiguation), multiple people
- Sylleste Davis (born 1961), American politician

=== T ===
- Tacario Davis (born 2004), American football player
- Tae Davis (born 1996), American football player
- Talmadge Davis (1962–2005), American native artist
- Támar Davis (born 1980), American singer
- Tamara Davis, Australian astrophysicist
- Tamari Davis (born 2003), American sprinter
- Tamika Davis, Jamaican politician
- Tammy Davis (born 1975), New Zealand actor
- Tamra Davis (born 1962), American film director
- Tanard Davis (born 1983), American football player
- Tania Davis (born 1975), British-Australian violinist
- Tanita S. Davis, American author
- Tanya Davis (born 1979), Canadian singer-songwriter
- Tanya Davis (artist), American artist
- Tanyalee Davis (born 1970), Canadian-American comedian
- Tara Davis (born 1999), American athlete
- Taylor Davis (disambiguation), multiple people
- T. Cullen Davis (1933–2026), American entrepreneur
- Te Ahu Davis (born 1985), New Zealand cricketer
- Te Aue Davis (1925–2010), New Zealand native weaver
- Ted Davis (disambiguation), multiple people
- Teddy Davis (1923–1966), American boxer
- Tenika Davis (born 1985), Canadian actress
- Teo Davis (1951–2016), American writer
- Teófilo Davis (1929–??), Venezuelan hurdler
- Terence Davis (born 1997), American basketball player
- Terrell Davis (born 1972), American football player
- Terril Davis (born 1968), American runner
- Terrill Davis (wide receiver) (born 2003), American football player
- Terry Davis (disambiguation), multiple people
- Thabiti Davis (born 1975), American football player
- Theodore Davis (disambiguation), multiple people
- Thomas Davis (disambiguation), multiple people
- Thornetta Davis (born 1963), American singer
- Thulani Davis (born 1949), American playwright
- Tim Davis (disambiguation), multiple people
- Tina Davis (born 1960), American politician
- Tina Davis (music industry executive), American music industry executive
- Tiny Davis (1907–1994), American trumpeter
- Titus Davis (1993–2020), American football player
- TJ Davis (born 1968), British singer
- T. Neil Davis (1932–2016), American geophysicist
- Tobé Coller Davis (1888–1962), American columnist
- Toby Davis (born 1991), British racing driver
- Tod Davis (1924–1978), American baseball player
- Todd Davis (disambiguation), multiple people
- Tom Davis (disambiguation), multiple people
- Tony Davis (disambiguation), multiple people
- Torrey Davis (born 1988), American football player
- Tracey Davis (born 1977), Australian swimmer
- Tracie Davis (born 1970), American politician
- Tracy Davis (born 1962), Australian politician
- Travis Davis (born 1973), American football player
- Trench Davis (born 1960), American baseball player
- Tres Davis (born 1982), American tennis player
- Trevor Davis (born 1993), American football player
- Trina Davis (born 2001), American soccer player
- Trisha Davis (born 1954), American biochemist
- Tristan Davis (born 1986), American football player
- Troy Davis (disambiguation), multiple people
- Tyler Davis (disambiguation), multiple people
- Tyree Davis (born 1970), American football player
- Tyrell Davis (1902–1970), British actor
- Tyrone Davis (disambiguation), multiple people

=== U ===
- Ulysses Davis (1872–1924), American film director
- Ulysses Davis (artist) (1913–1990), American sculptor
- Uri Davis (born 1943), Israeli-Palestinian academic

=== V ===
- Vaginal Davis (born 1969), American drag queen
- Van Davis (1921–1987), American football player
- Vanessa Davis (actress), Australian actress
- Vanessa Davis (cartoonist) (born 1978), cartoonist
- Varina Davis (1826–1906), American social figure
- Varina Anne Davis (1864–1898), American author
- Vera Gilbride Davis (1894–1974), American politician
- Vern Davis (born 1949), American football player
- Vernon Davis (born 1984), American football player
- Vernon M. Davis (1855–1932), American lawyer
- Vestie Davis (1903–1978), American painter
- Vicky Davis (1925–2006), American fashion designer
- Victor Davis (1964–1989), Canadian swimmer
- Victor Davis (footballer) (1902–1981), Australian rules footballer
- Vincent Davis (born 1963), American politician
- Viola Davis (born 1965), American actress
- Viola Davis (Georgia politician) (born 1963), American politician
- Virgil L. Davis Jr. (born 1960), American record producer
- Virginia Davis (1918–2009), American actress
- Viveka Davis (born 1969), American actress
- Volney Davis (1902–1982), American bank robber
- Vontae Davis (1988–2024), American football player

=== W ===
- Waana Davis (1938–2019), New Zealand teacher
- Wade Davis (disambiguation), multiple people
- Wallace Davis, American football player
- Wallace Ray Davis (1949–2007), American televangelist
- Walt Davis (1931–2020), American athlete
- Walter Davis (disambiguation), multiple people
- Wantha Davis (1917–2012), American jockey
- Ward Davis, American singer-songwriter
- Warren Davis (disambiguation), multiple people
- Warwick Davis (born 1970), British actor
- Watson Davis (1896–1967), American entrepreneur
- Wayne Davis (disambiguation), multiple people
- Webster Davis (1861–1923), American politician
- Wee Willie Davis (1906–1981), American actor
- Wendell Davis (disambiguation), multiple people
- Wendy Davis (disambiguation), multiple people
- Westmoreland Davis (1859–1942), American lawyer and politician
- W. Eugene Davis (born 1936), American judge
- W. Harry Davis (1923–2006), American activist
- Whitney Davis (born 1958), American writer
- Wild Bill Davis (1918–1995), American pianist
- Wiley Davis (1875–1942), American baseball player
- Will Davis (disambiguation), multiple people
- William Davis (disambiguation), multiple people
- Willie Davis (disambiguation), multiple people
- Willis Davis (disambiguation), multiple people
- Wilma Z. Davis (1912–2001), American codebreaker
- Wilton Davis (1929–2004), American football player
- Winston Davis (disambiguation), multiple people
- W. Kenneth Davis (1918–2005), American chemist
- W. Lester Davis (??–1978), American politician and businessman
- Woody Davis (1913–1999), American baseball player
- W. True Davis Jr. (1919–2003), American businessman
- W. Turner Davis (1901–1988), American politician
- Wyatt Davis (born 1999), American football player

=== X ===
- Xavier Davis (born 1971), American pianist

=== Y ===
- Yonus Davis (born 1984), American football player
- Yvonne Davis (born 1955), American politician

=== Z ===
- Zachary Taylor Davis (1869–1946), American architect
- Zara Davis (born 1966), British windsurfer
- Zeinabu irene Davis (born 1961), American filmmaker
- Zelma Davis (born 1970), Liberian singer
- Zola Davis (born 1975), American football player

== Fictional characters ==
- Mrs. Davis, the artificial intelligence of the television series Mrs. Davis
- Alexis Davis (General Hospital), fictional soap opera character
- Brooke Davis (One Tree Hill), fictional soap opera character
- Clay Davis, in the drama series The Wire
- Diana Davis (Sliders), in Sliders
- Jo Davis (EastEnders), a character during the 2007 season of EastEnders
- Kristina Davis, in the soap opera General Hospital
- Llewyn Davis, in the film Inside Llewyn Davis
- Manuel Garcia O'Kelly-Davis, protagonist of The Moon Is a Harsh Mistress by Robert A. Heinlein
- Natalie Davis aka The Miniature Killer, from CSI: Crime Scene Investigation

== See also ==
- Admiral Davis (disambiguation)
- Attorney General Davis (disambiguation)
- General Davis (disambiguation)
- Governor Davis (disambiguation)
- Justice Davis (disambiguation)
- Representative Davis (disambiguation)
- Senator Davis (disambiguation)
