= Susan Davis =

Susan Davis may refer to:

- Susan Davis (politician) (born 1944), U.S. representative for California
- Susan Davis (author), American financial executive and social planner who organizes aid
- Susan Hatch Davis (born 1953), American politician from Vermont
- Susan Topliff Davis (1862–1931), American non-profit executive
- Susan Davis (born 1956), British participant in the Up series documentaries
- Jeramie Rain (born 1948), American actress born Susan Davis

== See also ==
- Davis (surname)
- List of people with surname Davis
- Susan Davies (Paralympian), Australian archer
- Susan Davies (born 1954), Australian politician
- Sue Davies (1933–2020), founder of the Photographers' Gallery in 1971
- Susan Davis Wigenton (born 1962), United States district judge
- Suzanne Davis (disambiguation)
