= Amanda Davis =

Amanda Davis may refer to:

- Amanda Davis (journalist) (1955–2017), American journalist
- Amanda Davis (writer) (1971–2003), American writer

== See also ==
- Amanda Davies, English sports presenter
- List of people with surname Davis
