= Dwight Davis =

Dwight Davis may refer to:

- Dwight F. Davis (1879–1945), American tennis player and politician
- Delbert Dwight Davis (1908–1965), American zoologist
- Dwight Davis (basketball) (born 1949), American basketball player

== See also ==
- Dwight Davis Tennis Center, St Louis, Missouri, USA
