= Karen Davis =

Karen Davis may refer to:

- Karen Davis (activist) (1944–2023), American animal-rights activist
- Karen Davis (neuroscientist), neuroscientist at University of Toronto, Canada
- Karen Davis (economist) (born 1942), president of The Commonwealth Fund
- Karen Davis (The Grudge), a fictional character from The Grudge film series
- Karon Davis (born 1977), American visual artist, and museum co-founder

== See also ==
- Karen Davies (born 1965), golfer from Wales
