= Andre Davis (disambiguation) =

André Davis (born 1979) is a former American football wide receiver.

Andre Davis may also refer to:

- Andre M. Davis (born 1949), American judge
- Andre Davis (wide receiver, born 1993), American football player
- Andre Davis (defensive tackle) (born 1975)
- Andre Davis (running back) (born c. 1974), American football player

== See also ==
- Andra Davis (born 1978), former American football player
- Davis (surname)
- List of people with surname Davis
