= Raymond Davis =

Raymond Davis may refer to:

- Ray Davis (American football) (born 1999), American football player
- Ray Davis (musician) (1940–2005), American musician
- Ray Davis (businessman) (born 1941), American businessman
- Raymond Allen Davis (born 1974), a former American soldier and a criminal involved in the 2011 Lahore shootings
- Raymond Allen Davis (born 1974), American military officer
- Raymond Cazallis Davis (1836–1919), American librarian
- Ray E. Davis (1907–1972), American football player and coach
- Raymond E. Davis (1885–1965), American naval officer
- Raymond G. Davis (1915–2003), American general
- Raymond Davis Jr. (1914–2006), American physicist
- Raymond Davis (1968-2025), American record producer and rapper

== See also ==
- Raymond Davies (disambiguation)
- Raymond Allen Davis incident, a former American soldier and a criminal involved in the 2011 Lahore shootings
- Ray Davies (born 1944), frontman of The Kinks
- Wallace Ray Davis (1949–2007), televangelist and owner of Affiliated Media Group
