= Lynn Davis =

Lyn(n) Davi(e)s can refer to:

- Lynn E. Davis (born 1943), U.S. Under Secretary of State
- Lynn Davis (photographer) (born 1944), American photographer
- Lynn Davies (born 1942), Welsh long jumper, Olympic gold medalist
- Lynn Davies (poet), Canadian poet
- Lyn Davis (1943–2008), New Zealand rugby player
- Lyn Davies (born 1947), Welsh footballer
- Lyn Davies (rugby union) (1940–2004), Welsh rugby player
- Lynn Yamada Davis (1956–2024), better known as Lynja, TikTok chef

== See also ==
- Linda Davies (active since 1995), British author
