= Willis Davis =

Willis Davis may refer to:

- Willis E. Davis (painter) (1855–1910), California landscape painter, father of the tennis champion
- Willis E. Davis (tennis) (1893–1936), American champion tennis player, son of the landscape painter
- Willis Davis (Mississippi politician), state legislator in Mississippi (African-American officeholders during and following the Reconstruction era)
- Bing Davis (Willis Davis, born 1937), African American artist and educator
