= Ethel Davis =

Ethel Davis may refer to:

- Ethel McGhee Davis (1899–1990), African American educator, social worker, and college administrator
- Ethel Davis Wilson (1888–1980), Canadian writer of short stories and novels.
- Ethel Davis (diplomat) Liberian ambassador
