= Tyler Davis =

Tyler Davis may refer to:

- Robert Tyler Davis (1904–1978), American art historian
- Tyler Davis Bingham (born c. 1947), American member of the Aryan Brotherhood prison gang
- Tyler Davis (placekicker) (born 1994), American football player
- Tyler Davis (tight end) (born 1997), American football player
- Tyler Davis (basketball) (born 1997), American basketball player
- Tyler Davis (baseball) (born 1998), American baseball pitcher
- Tyler Davis (defensive lineman) (born 2000), American football player
- Tyler Watkins Davis, American arrested for involvement in violence at the Unite the Right rally in Charlottesville, Virginia, in August 2017

== See also ==
- Tyler David (born 1994), American soccer player
- Taylor Davis (disambiguation)
