= Norman Davis =

Norman Davis or Norm Davis may refer to:

== Sports ==
- Norman Davis (American football) (1945–2002), American football player
- Norm Davis (1904–1966), Australian Rules footballer
- Norm Davis (pickleball), 2022 Pickleball Hall of Fame inductee

== Other ==
- Norman Davis (diplomat) (1878–1944), American diplomat
- Norman Davis (academic) (1913–1989), British professor of English language

== See also ==
- Norman Davies (born 1939), English historian
