= Pauline Davis =

Pauline Davis may refer to:

- Pauline Davis-Thompson (born 1966), née Davis, Bahamian Olympic sprinter
- Pauline Davis (politician) (1917–1995), U.S. politician who served in the California Assembly
- Pauline Davis (First lady) of First ladies of North Dakota
- Pauline Davis (badminton), played in 1977 All England Open Badminton Championships

== See also ==
- Paulina Davis (1813–1876), American abolitionist, suffragist, and educator
