= Karen Davis (neuroscientist) =

Canadian professor

- Education: University of Toronto, Johns Hopkins University
- Known for: Brain Imaging, Pain, Intracranial recordings, Electrophysiology
- Awards: Johns Hopkins Society of Scholars, Canadian Pain Society Distinguished Career Award and Outstanding Pain Mentorship Award
- Scientific career
- Fields: Neuroscience
- Workplaces: University of Toronto, University Health Network
- Doctoral advisor: Jonathan Dostrovsky
- Other academic advisors: James Campbell, Richard Meyer, Srinivasa Raja

Karen Davis is a neuroscience professor at the University of Toronto, the Canada Research Chair in Acute and Chronic Pain Research (tier 1), Senior Scientist and Head of the Division of Brain, Imaging & Behaviour, Krembil Research Institute at the University Health Network.

Davis was inducted into the Johns Hopkins Society of Scholars in 2009, the Canadian Academy of Health Sciences in 2018 and the Royal Society of Canada in 2020. She served as President of the Canadian Pain Society (2020–2022) and was awarded with the CPS Distinguished Career Award. Since 2023, Davis has been serving as the Editor-in-Chief of PAIN, the journal of the International Association for the Study of Pain.

Davis previously held a tier 2 Canada Research Chair in Brain and Behaviour. and was a Mayday Pain and Society Fellow.

== Research ==
Davis' main interest is the central mechanisms underlying acute and chronic pain and temperature perception, the influence of attention, and mechanisms of plasticity under normal conditions and in patients with neurologic or psychiatric disorders. A variety of experimental techniques are used, including functional brain imaging (fMRI, PET, MEG), psychophysical and cognitive assessment, and electrophysiological recordings in the thalamus and cortex. Davis' laboratory has developed innovative brain-imaging approaches, culminating in the first functional MRI images of brain networks underlying the human pain experience and the first images of the impact of deep brain stimulation for Parkinsonian tremor.

Davis has also worked on variety of chronic pain conditions, concussion, and phantom pain. She has demonstrated that findings support the hypothesis that the thalamic representation of the amputated limb remains functional in amputees with phantom sensations. Through several studies, she has shown important interactions between pain and cognition, by studying how brain networks shift their function towards pain while multitasking on cognitive tasks (Seminowicz et al., 2007; Erpelding et al., 2013) or when processing multimodal sensory information (Downar et al., 2000) or during mind wandering (Kucyi et al., 2013). She has introduced two influential theories that builds on the neuromatrix concept of Melzack. In the "pain switch" concept (Davis et al., 2015), she emphasizes the basic feeling of "ouch" that must be represented by a core brain mechanism, regardless of pain intensity or quality. The other concept is called the Dynamic Pain Connectome which emphasizes that spatiotemporal representation of pain in the brain is dynamic and includes activity in the salience and default mode network as well as the ascending nociceptive and antinociceptive pathways.

Davis has published over 200 journal articles and book chapters that have been cited over 32,000 times and she has an h-index of 95.

== Neuroethics activities ==
Davis is active in neuroethics research and knowledge translations She has written to raise awareness of the neuroethical and legal issues related to using brain imaging to diagnose chronic pain. She chaired an IASP task force that studied this issue culminating in a paper "Brain imaging tests for chronic pain: medical, legal and ethical issues and recommendations" published in Nature Reviews Neurology in 2017. She is also co-volume editor with Daniel Buchman of a book volume on Pain Neuroethics (Elsevier; Judy Illes, Book Series editor).

== Educational programs and outreach ==
Davis has been recognized for her outstanding mentorship by the Institute of Medical Science, University of Toronto (Silverman Award) and by the Canadian Pain Society Outstanding Pain Mentorship Award.

Davis has also created educational programs and published the book New Techniques for Examining the Brain. Her TED-Ed video titled "How does your brain respond to pain?" has over 2.8 million views.

== Hippocratic Oath for scientists ==
Davis and her colleagues have made a case for a scholar's oath similar to Hippocratic Oath as a standard requirement for scientists. The oath text as used in the Institute Medical Sciences, Toronto is as follows:

I promise never to allow financial gain, competitiveness or ambition cloud my judgment in the conduct of ethical research and scholarship. I will pursue knowledge and create knowledge for the greater good, but never to the detriment of colleagues, supervisors, research subjects or the international community of scholars of which I am now a member.

== Selected publications ==
- Kucyi, Aaron; Davis, Karen D. (1 February 2015). "The dynamic pain connectome". Trends in Neurosciences. 38 (2): 86–95. doi:10.1016/j.tins.2014.11.006. PMID 25541287. S2CID 745129.
- Kucyi, Aaron; Salomons, Tim V.; Davis, Karen D. (12 November 2013). "Mind wandering away from pain dynamically engages antinociceptive and default mode brain networks". Proceedings of the National Academy of Sciences. 110 (46): 18692–18697. Bibcode:2013PNAS..11018692K. doi:10.1073/pnas.1312902110. PMC 3832014. PMID 24167282.
- Davis, Karen D.; Flor, Herta; Greely, Henry T.; Iannetti, Gian Domenico; Mackey, Sean; Ploner, Markus; Pustilnik, Amanda; Tracey, Irene; Treede, Rolf-Detlef; Wager, Tor D. (October 2017). "Brain imaging tests for chronic pain: medical, legal and ethical issues and recommendations" (PDF). Nature Reviews Neurology. 13 (10): 624–638. doi:10.1038/nrneurol.2017.122. PMID 28884750. S2CID 8571469.
- Davis, Karen D.; Seeman, Mary V.; Chapman, Josie; Rotstein, Ori D. (20 June 2008). "A Graduate Student Oath". Science. 320 (5883): 1587–1588. doi:10.1126/science.320.5883.1587b. PMID 18566266. S2CID 36827487.
- Downar, Jonathan; Crawley, Adrian P.; Mikulis, David J.; Davis, Karen D. (March 2000). "A multimodal cortical network for the detection of changes in the sensory environment". Nature Neuroscience. 3 (3): 277–283. doi:10.1038/72991. PMID 10700261. S2CID 8807081.
- Dostrovsky, J. O.; Davis, K. D.; Kawakita, K. (1 May 1991). "Central mechanisms of vascular headaches". Canadian Journal of Physiology and Pharmacology. 69 (5): 652–658. doi:10.1139/y91-097. hdl:1807/16983. PMID 1863916.
- Davis, Karen D.; Kiss, Zelma H. T.; Luo, Lei; Tasker, Ronald R.; Lozano, Andres M.; Dostrovsky, Jonathan O. (January 1998). "Phantom sensations generated by thalamic microstimulation". Nature. 391 (6665): 385–387. Bibcode:1998Natur.391..385D. doi:10.1038/34905. PMID 9450753. S2CID 205003876.
- Hashmi, Javeria A.; Davis, Karen D. (January 2014). "Deconstructing sex differences in pain sensitivity". Pain. 155 (1): 10–13. doi:10.1016/j.pain.2013.07.039. PMID 23891901. S2CID 9222331.
- Taylor, Keri S; Anastakis, Dimitri J; Davis, Karen D (November 2009). "Cutting your nerve changes your brain". Brain. 132 (11): 3122–3133. doi:10.1093/brain/awp231. PMID 19737843.
