= Earl Davis =

Earl Davis may refer to:

- Earl Davis (baseball) (fl. 1928–1936), American baseball player in the Negro Leagues
- Earl Davis (politician) (born 1934), American politician in Georgia
- Earl A. Davis (1889–1965), American college football and college basketball coach
- Earl Davis (born 1984), known professionally as Damu the Fudgemunk, American hip-hop producer, multi-instrumentalist, DJ, and rapper
