= Devin Davis =

Devin Davis may refer to:

- Devin Davis (musician) (fl. 2000s), American indie musician
- Devin Davis (basketball, born 1974), American/Spanish basketball player
- Devin Davis (basketball, born 1995), American basketball player
