= Wade Davis =

Wade Davis may refer to:

- Wade Davis (anthropologist) (born 1953), Canadian anthropologist and ethnobotanist
- Wade Davis (American football) (born 1977), former American football player
- Wade Davis (baseball) (born 1985), former baseball player
- Wade–Davis Bill, American legislation, vetoed by President Abraham Lincoln in 1864
- Wade Davis, president and CEO of UniMás
