= Elliot Davis =

Elliot Davis may refer to:

- Elliot Davis (composer), British composer, musician and music documentary maker
- Elliot Davis (cinematographer) (born 1948), American cinematographer

== See also ==
- Eliot Davis (1871–1954), member of the New Zealand Legislative Council
