= Clark Davis =

Clark Davis may refer to:

- Clark Davis (wrestler) (born 1957), Canadian wrestler
- Clark Janell Davis (born 1997), American beauty pageant titleholder
