= Ethel Davis (diplomat) =

Liberian diplomat

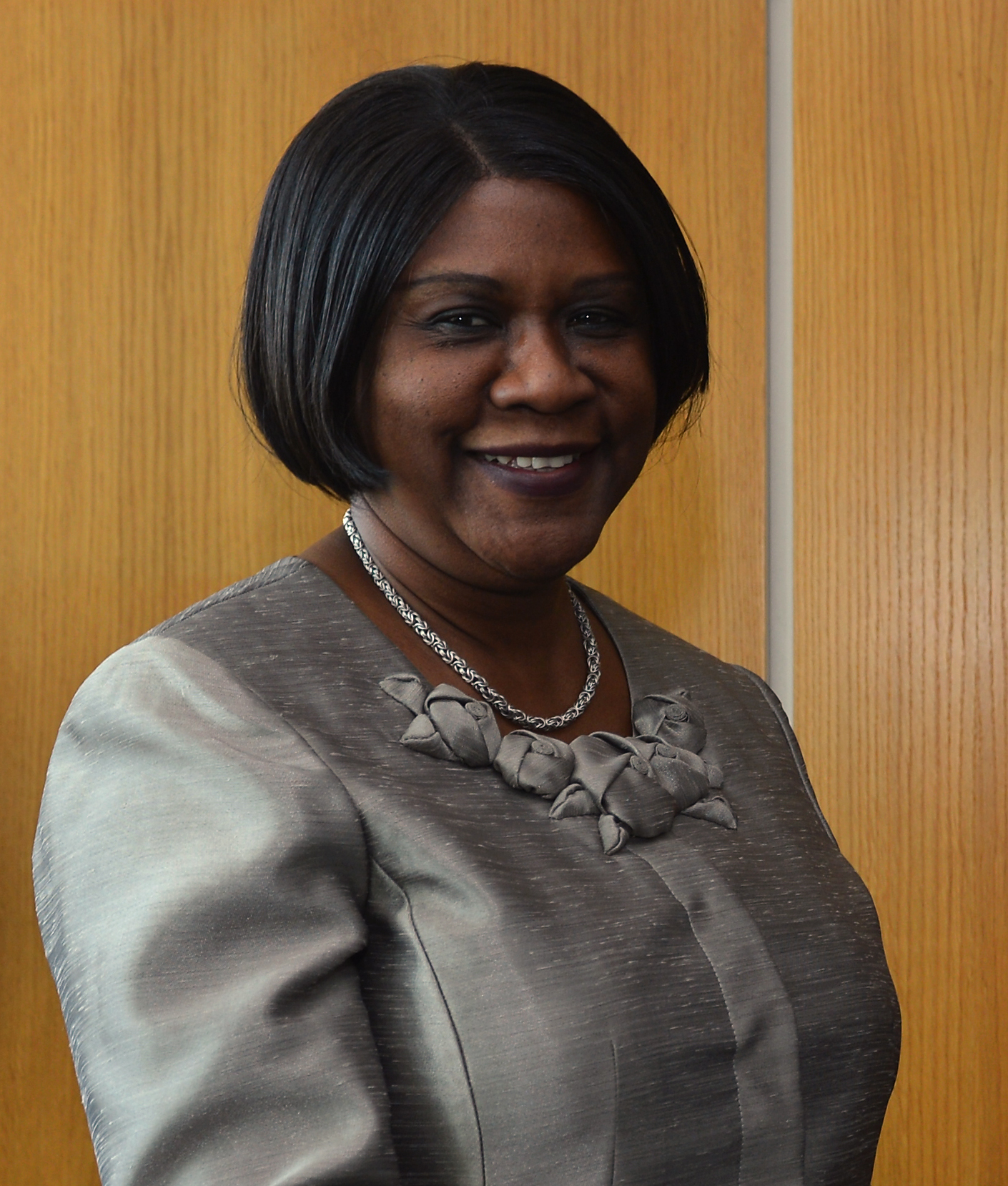
Ethel Davis in 2012

Ethel Davis is a Liberian diplomat who served as Liberia's Ambassador to Germany. She also serves as ambassador to Sweden, Denmark, Norway, Austria and Finland. She presented her credentials to Christian Wulff at Bellevue Palace (Germany) on December 13, 2010.

== Education ==
Davis earned a master's degree in Business Administration from the George Washington University and a bachelor's degree in Business Administration from the University of Liberia.

== Career ==
In 2009, three people working under Davis at the Central Bank of Liberia were accused of illegally transferring funds. During the investigation, Davis resigned from her position as Deputy Bank Governor. While she was found not culpable, she resigned to allow the investigation to proceed.

Her work in Liberia has included working on the Ebola virus epidemic in Liberia, a crisis she likened to war which required global action. Davis worked with multiple companies and towns in Germany encouraging aid for Liberia during the epidemic. During this period, she note that Ebola came to Liberia from Guinea, and thus the epidemic is only one plane ride away from Germany. In 2014 deaths from Ebola challenged Liberia's economy and social cohesion, as Davis noted during a global health summit in Berlin.
