= Oscar Davis =

Oscar Davis may refer to:

- Oscar Davis (baseball) (1896–1958), American baseball player
- Oscar Hirsh Davis (1914–1988), U.S. federal judge
- Oscar Davis (American football), American football guard
