= Russell Davis =

Russell Davis or Davies may refer to:

- Russ Davis (born 1969), baseball player
- Russell Davis (defensive tackle) (born 1975), National Football League player for the Chicago Bears, Arizona Cardinals, Seattle Seahawks and New York Giants
- Russell Davis (running back) (born 1956), Michigan Wolverines/Pittsburgh Steelers
- Russell Davies (footballer) (born 1954), Australian rules footballer
- Russell Davis (writer) (born 1970), American writer and past president of the Science Fiction Writers of America
- Russell C. Davis (general) (born 1938), United States Air Force general and former Chief, National Guard Bureau
- Russell C. Davis (politician) (1922–1993), mayor of Jackson, Mississippi
- Russell H. Davis (1897–1976), American school administrator and historian
- Derek Russell Davis (1914–1993), British psychiatrist
- Russell Davies (born 1946), British radio presenter and journalist
- Russell T Davies (born 1963), television scriptwriter
