= Victor Davis (footballer) =

Australian rules footballer

Personal information
- Full name: Victor Davis
- Born: 2 November 1902; Eaglehawk, Victoria
- Died: 2 September 1981 (aged 78); Carrum Downs, Victoria

Playing career^{1}
Years	Club	Games (Goals)
1925–26	Carlton	19 (42)
- ^{1} Playing statistics correct to the end of 1926.

Victor Davis (2 November 1902 – 2 September 1981) was an Australian rules footballer who played with Carlton in the Victorian Football League (VFL).
