= Keith Davis =

Keith Davis may refer to:

- Keith Davis (safety) (born 1978), former American football safety
- Keith Davis (linebacker), former American football linebacker and current motivational speaker
- Keith Davis (cricketer) (1935–2026), English cricketer
- Keith Davis (rugby union) (1930–2019), former international New Zealand rugby union player
- Keith F. Davis (born 1952), American photography curator
- Keith Davis (sprinter), winner of the 1971 4 × 440 yard relay at the NCAA Division I Indoor Track and Field Championships

== See also ==
- Shooting of Keith Davis, Jr.
- Keith Davies, Welsh Labour politician
- Keith Davies (footballer) (1934–2024), footballer for Tranmere Rovers
