= Edith Davis =

Edith Davis may refer to:

- Edith Luckett Davis (1888–1987), American actress and mother-in-law of US president Ronald Reagan
- Edith Smith Davis (1859–1918), leader in the temperance movement
- Edith Kunhardt Davis (1937–2020), American writer
