= Troy Davis (disambiguation) =

Troy Davis (1968–2011) was convicted of murder and executed in 2011.

Troy Davi(e)s may also refer to:

- Troy Davis (Australian footballer) (born 1992), Australian rules footballer for Melbourne
- Troy Davis (linebacker) (born 1991), New York Jets outside linebacker
- Troy Davis (running back) (born 1975), National Football League and Canadian Football League running back
- Troy Davies (1960–2007), Australian artist and musician
