= Ross Davis =

Ross Davis may refer to:

- Ross Davis (athlete) (born 1968), American Paralympic athlete
- Ross Davis (baseball) (1918–2013), African-American baseball pitcher in the Negro leagues
- Ross Davis (racing driver) (born 1950), former American racing driver
- Ross Davis (bowls) (born 1994), Jersey lawn bowls international

== See also ==
- Ross Davies (born 1984), rugby player
- Ross Davies (bishop) (born 1955), Australian former bishop of the Anglican Church of Australia
