= Nic Davis =

American documentary filmmaker

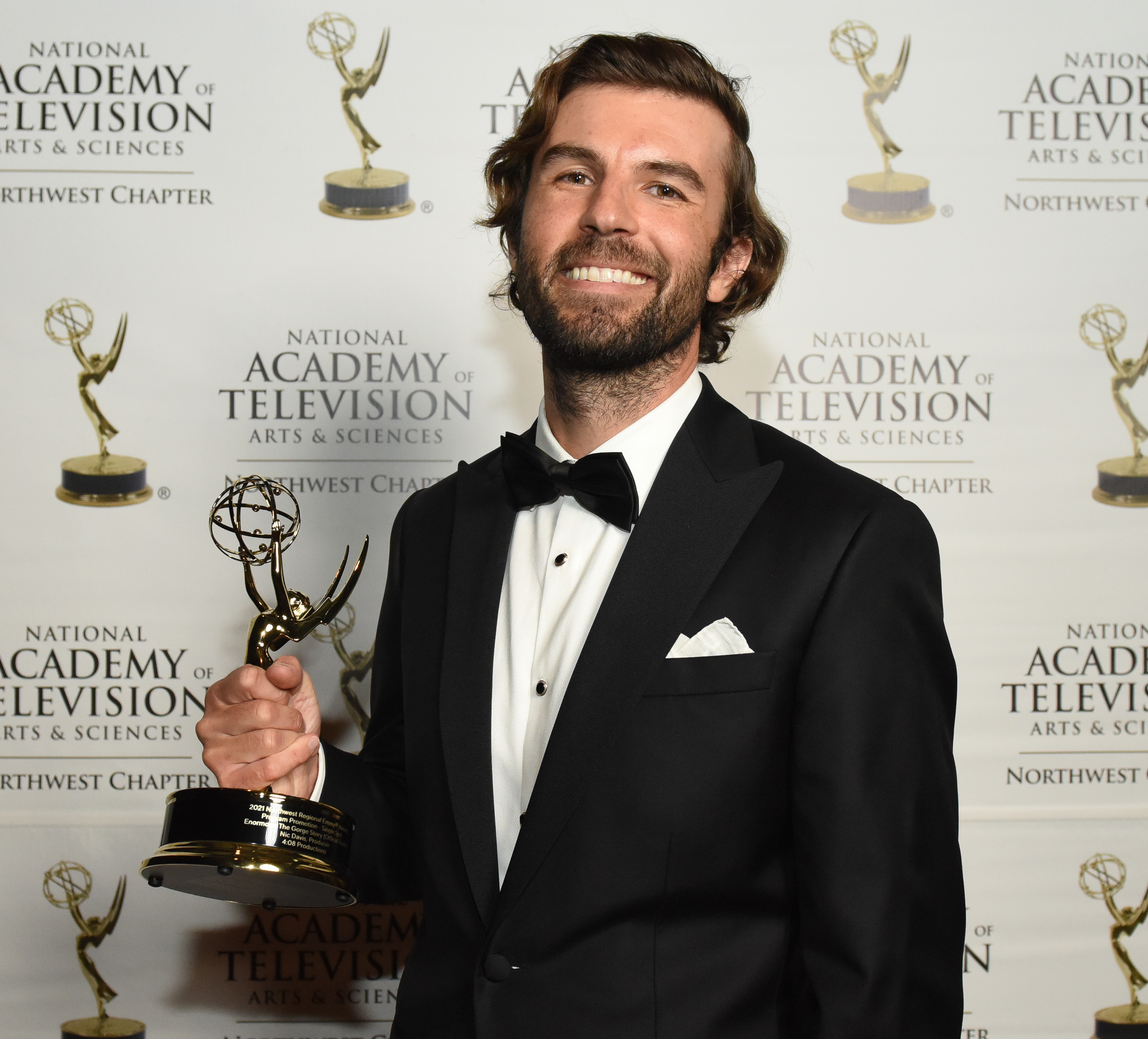
- Born: Bozeman, Montana, U.S.
- Education: University of Montana
- Occupations: Writer, director, film producer
- Years active: 2011–present

Nic Davis is an American documentary filmmaker. Davis produced and directed the 2021 documentary film Enormous: The Gorge Story.

== Life and career ==
Davis was raised in Bozeman, Montana. He graduated from Bozeman High School in 2006 and then attended college in Missoula where he graduated from The University of Montana with a degree in Broadcast Journalism. He currently lives between Los Angeles, CA and Bozeman.

During the early part of his career, Davis worked as a director, cinematographer, and editor for networks and clients including BBC, Disney, Live Nation, Daimler-Benz, CNN, Bloomberg, Cadillac, Hulu, and Discovery. He was the director and cinematographer of the music video for JP Saxe's Sad Corny F*ck. Other artists and actors he has worked with include Jennifer Garner, Seth Rogen, Jason Mraz, Killer Mike (Run the Jewels), Pearl Jam and Dave Matthews. In 2011, he launched the production company, 4:08 Productions.

Davis’ most notable production is the film Enormous: The Gorge Story, a documentary about the Gorge Amphitheatre. Enormous: The Gorge Story was directed by Davis and released theatrically in July 2021. In 2022, Davis won an Emmy for this documentary. He produced and directed Landscapes of a Western Mind: The Story of Ivan Doig, a documentary about American author and novelist Ivan Doig. The film's trailer was released in 2021. It premiered at the Big Sky Documentary Film Festival and was released on PBS in 2023.

In 2016, Davis and 4:08 Productions developed a series of short films called The Montana Sessions that featured performances by musicians from Montana. The series was nominated for Emmy's in 2019, 2021 and 2022 and aired on PBS.

Davis most recently directed 21 Miles, a documentary film about the Pacific Coast Highway. The documentary highlights the dangers of the route and chronicles the accidents and deaths that have resulted on the highway. The film premiered at the Santa Barbara International Film Festival. The film received multiple awards at film festivals including at the WorldFest-Houston International Film Festival and Malibu Film Festival.
