= Noah Davis =

Noah Davis may refer to:

- Noah Davis (judge) (1818–1902), American lawyer and politician
- Noah Davis (Baptist minister) (1804–1867), American freedman and Baptist minister
- Noah Davis (baseball) (born 1997), American baseball player
- Noah Davis (painter) (1983–2015), American painter and installation artist
- Noah K. Davis (1830–1910), American educator
