= Nelson Davis =

Nelson Davis may refer to:

- Nelson Charles Davis, the spouse of Harriet Tubman
- Nelson H. Davis (1821–1888), American soldier
- Nelson M. Davis, former chairman of the Argus Corporation
- Nelson Davis, character in Killshot (film)

== See also ==
- Nelson Davis Porter (1863–1961), mayor of Ottawa, Canada, 1915–1916
