= Jackie Davis (disambiguation) =

Jackie Davis (1920–1999) was an American soul jazz singer, organist and bandleader.

Jackie Davis may also refer to:

- Jackie Davis (writer) (born 1963), New Zealand author and poet

== See also ==
- Jack E. Davis, American Pulitzer Prize-winning author
- Jacke Davis (1936–2021), American baseball player
- Jackie Davies (born 1977), British bobsledder
- Jack Davis (disambiguation)
