= Wendell Davis =

Wendell Davis may refer to:

- Wendell Davis (cornerback) (born 1973), American football player
- Wendell Davis (tight end) (born 1975), American football player
- Wendell Davis (wide receiver) (born 1966), American football player
