= A. J. Davis =

A. J. Davis may refer to:

- Alexander Jackson Davis (1803–1892), American architect
- Andrew Jackson Davis (1826–1910), American Spiritualist
- A. J. Davis (cornerback, born 1983) (born 1983), American football player
- A. J. Davis (cornerback, born 1989) (born 1989), American football player
- A. J. Davis (basketball) (born 1995), American professional basketball player
