= Nicolaus Davis =

Greek genre and landscape painter

Nicolaus Davis (or Nikolaus Davis Greek: Νικόλαος Δάβης; 1 January 1883 – 4 August 1967) was a Greek genre and landscape painter.

== Biography ==
He was born in Amorgos as the son Nicolaos Davis and Eusevia Melidou. He had one brother Stelianos Davis. He never had children but was a devoted uncle to his brothers 5 children born in Siros Greece. His parents moved to Athens where he visited the School of Arts as a guest lecturer. In 1908 with a scholarship he went to Munich and studied at the Academy of Fine Arts Munich. His teachers there were Carl von Marr and Ludwig von Löfftz. Davis became member of the Munich Artist Union (Münchner Künstlergenossenschaft) and participated at the international Glaspalast exhibitions in 1918, 1919, 1922 and 1925. His studio was in Schwabing.

Nicolaus Davis died in Ebersberg (near Munich) in 1967.

== Works ==
His still life paintings were more commonly made into post cards compared to his other works.

Among his works are:

- Two masted bargue in full sail
- Lake Chiemsee (formerly Heinrich Hausmann Collection)

== Literature ==
- Dresslers Kunsthandbuch, Band II, Berlin 1930, S.169
- Künstlerlexikon Vollmer, Band I., 1953, S.625
- Münchner Maler im 19./20. Jahrhundert, Band 5 Achmann-Kursell, 1993
