= Jesse Davis =

Jesse Davis may refer to:

- Jesse Davis (American football) (born 1991), American football player
- Jesse Davis (saxophonist) (born 1965), American saxophonist
- Jesse Ed Davis (1944–1988), American guitarist

== See also ==
- Jess H. Davis (1906–1971), American academic administrator
- Jessie Bartlett Davis (1860–1905), American singer
