= Preston Davis =

Preston Davis may refer to:

- Preston Davis (American football) (born 1962), American football player
- Preston Davis (politician) (1907–1990), American politician
- Preston Davis (runner) (born 1944), winner of the mile at the 1968 USA Indoor Track and Field Championships
