= Alice Davis =

Alice Davis may refer to:

- Alice Estes Davis (1929–2022), American costume designer
- Alice Brown Davis (1852–1935), first female Principal Chief of the Seminole Nation of Oklahoma

== See also ==
- Alice Hart-Davis, British journalist and author
- Alice Davies, British suffragette and nurse
