= Julia Davis (disambiguation) =

Julia Davis (born 1966) is an English comedy writer and performer.

Julia Davis may also refer to:

- Julia Davis (fencer) (born 1941), British Olympic fencer
- Julia Davis (educator) (1891–1993), American teacher
- Julia Davis (journalist) (1974–), Ukrainian-American journalist
- Julia Davis (née McDonald, died 1900), first wife of ambassador John W. Davis

== See also ==
- Julie Davis (born 1969), American film director, writer and actress
