= Chad Davis =

Chad Davis may refer to:

- Chad Davis (footballer) (born 1980), Australian rules footballer
- Chad Davis (American football) (born 1973), American football player
