= Teo Davis =

American writer

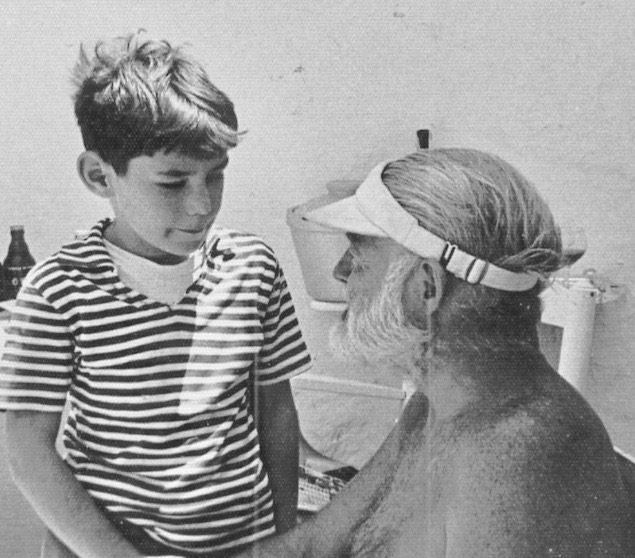
- Teo Davis and Ernest Hemingway at La Cónsula, 1959
- Born: Timothy Logan Bakewell Davis; April 18, 1951; Paris, France
- Died: March 1, 2016 (aged 64)
- Education: West Downs School; Eton College (1970)
- Occupation: Writer
- Spouse: Diana Radway
- Children: 0
- Writing career
- Period: 1973–2016

Timothy Logan Bakewell Davis (born April 18, 1951) was an American writer who worked in Hollywood from the mid-1970s to his death.

== Early life and education ==
The elder of two children, Teo Davis was born in Paris. His father, William Nathan Davis, was “a wealthy patron of the arts from Indianapolis and a graduate of Yale". His mother, Anne Bakewell Davis of Baltimore, was a distant descendant of John James Audubon, the French-born ornithologist, naturalist, and painter.

Davis grew up in Málaga, Spain in his family villa, La Cónsula.

During the summer of 1959, eight-year-old Davis befriended author and Nobel laureate Ernest Hemingway, who was staying at his home. The story of their friendship was told in the book Looking for Hemingway; Spain, The Bullfights and a Final Rite of Passage.

When he was thirteen, Davis left Spain to attend West Downs School in Winchester, Hampshire, and then Eton College in Windsor, England, from which he graduated in 1970. Davis then headed to America after failing to gain acceptance into the University of Oxford.

== Career ==
In 1973, at the age of 21, Davis arrived in Texas, becoming a reporter for the state's largest newspaper, the Houston Chronicle. Although Davis had no reporting experience nor could he even type, he had an important Texas connection who arranged the job; Barefoot Sanders, former counsel to President Lyndon B. Johnson.

== Personal life ==
Teo Davis married Diana Radway in 1980 in Chelsea, London, and their engagement was announced in The New York Times. However, they divorced in 1981.

== Death ==
Davis's worsening addiction to cocaine, heroin, crystal meth and other drugs became apparent to his friends in the mid-1980s; he was arrested several times for possession, and eventually died March 1, 2016 due complications with diabetes and heart failure caused by his struggles with substance abuse.

Davis' longtime friend, Tracy Tynan, wrote: "Throughout his life he struggled with substance abuse, but for the last two years he had been sober. Sadly, his addictions had left him with a myriad of health problems and on March 1, his heart gave out. He was a funny, smart, infuriating, unique guy. He will be greatly missed."
