= Marc Davis =

Marc Davis may refer to:

- Marc Davis (academic), computer science professor
- Mark Davis (actor) (born 1965), also credited as Marc Davis, British pornography actor
- Marc Davis (animator) (1913–2000), Walt Disney Studios animator
- Marc Davis (astronomer) (born 1947), astrophysicist and professor
- Marc Davis (racing driver) (born 1990), NASCAR driver
- Marc Davis (runner) (born 1969), American middle-distance runner

== See also ==
- Marcus Davis (born 1973), fighter
- Marcus Davis (American football), (born 1989), wide receiver
- Mark Davis (disambiguation)
