= Dolor Davis =

Coat of arms of Dolar Davis

Dolor Davis (c. 1599-June 1673), also spelled Dolar Davis, was an English-born carpenter, master builder, and early settler of colonial Massachusetts. Born in Kent, England, he emigrated to New England in 1634 and lived in Cambridge, Duxbury, Barnstable, and Concord during his life in the colonies.

Davis married Margery Willard in Kent in 1624, and the couple had six children. In Massachusetts, he became a landholder, church member, and local officeholder, serving in roles including surveyor of highways and constable in Barnstable. He spent his later years in Barnstable, where he died in 1673.

== Early life and emigration ==
Davis was born about 1599 in Kent, England. He married Margery Willard, daughter of Richard Willard of Horsemonden, Kent, at the parish church in East Farleigh on 29 March 1624. Margery was baptised at Horsemonden on 7 November 1602 and died before 1667. Her brother, Simon Willard, became a lifelong associate of Davis.

Other than his occupation as a carpenter and master builder, little is known of Davis's early life in England. He sailed to America and landed in Boston in May 1634. On 4 August 1635, he bought 25 acres (10 ha) of land on the west side of the river in Cambridge, Massachusetts. On 17 April 1635, his wife and three children embarked from London for New England on the Elizabeth, and the family settled in Cambridge. On 4 June 1635, Davis bought a house lot of half a rood at what is now the corner of Winthrop and Dunster streets.

Like many settlers during the years 1635 to 1636, Davis did not remain in Cambridge permanently. In August 1635, he and Simon Willard sold their Cambridge land to Richard Girling.

== Duxbury ==
Davis moved to Duxbury by 1638 or 1639. He was admitted a freeman and was granted land there in 1640. During that year, he received 50 acres (20 ha) of land and additional land for grazing cattle. He also became a member of the Duxbury church in 1640.

On 27 August 1648, Davis and his wife were dismissed from the Duxbury church to move to the church at Barnstable.

== Barnstable ==
By 1643, Davis had moved to Barnstable. He and his sons appeared on a list of men in Barnstable between 16 and 60 years of age able to bear arms. In June 1645, he was sworn in as a member of the Grand Inquest of Plymouth Colony. A year later, he became a freeman of Barnstable.

In 1652, Davis was chosen surveyor of highways in Barnstable. In 1654, he was chosen constable of the town. He continued to live in Barnstable and practise his trade as a carpenter until leaving for Concord in 1655.

Davis returned to Barnstable from Concord in 1666 and remained there for the rest of his life. His will, dated 13 September 1672, was proved on 2 July 1673. In it, he mentioned his sons Simon and Samuel as already having received their portions, and referred to his son John, his daughter Mary, his daughter Ruth Hall, and his son-in-law Lewis.

== Concord ==
In 1656, Davis left Plymouth Colony and settled in Concord, Massachusetts, where he lived for the next eleven years. He bought 150 acres (61 ha) of land, with a house and several parcels, from Roger Draper of Concord. This property became his homestead in Concord.

While living in Concord, Davis was again associated with Simon Willard. In 1659, he was recorded as one of the landowners in the town. Sometime during his residence in Concord, his wife Margery died. After her death, he left Concord in 1666 and returned to Barnstable.

== Name ==
Davis's given name was pronounced "Dollar". Variants of his name found in records include Dolor, Dolar, Dolard, Dolord, Dolore, Dollard, Dolerd, Dollerd, and Dollar.

== Marriage and children ==
Davis married Margery Willard of Horsemonden, Kent, in 1624. They had six children, three born in England and three in New England:

- John Davis, born 1626 in East Farleigh, England; inherited the homestead; died 9 April 1703 in Barnstable; married Hannah Linnell
- Mary Davis, born 1631 in England
- Elizabeth Davis, born 1633 in England; died young
- Samuel Davis, born 11 July 1639 in Cambridge, Massachusetts; died 30 October 1720 in Concord, Massachusetts; married Mary Meadows
- Simon Davis, born 1640 in Massachusetts
- Ruth Davis, born 1645 in Barnstable, Massachusetts
