= Shelby Davis =

Shelby Davis may refer to:

- Shelby Cullom Davis (1909–1994), American investor and diplomat
- Shelby M.C. Davis (born 1937), American investor; son of Shelby Collum Davis
