= Adrian Davis =

Adrian Davis may refer to:

- Adrian Davis (Canadian football) (born 1981), Canadian football defensive tackle
- Adrian Davis (rugby league) (born 1990), Australian rugby league player
- Adrian Davis (civil servant), British economist and civil servant, governor of Montserrat
