= Eric Davis =

Eric Davis may refer to:

- Eric Davis (American football) (born 1968), former American football player
- Eric Davis (baseball) (born 1962), former Major League Baseball center fielder
- Eric Davis (clown), American actor, comedian, director and clown
- Eric Davis (footballer, born 1932) (1932–2007), English footballer
- Eric Davis (Panamanian footballer) (born 1991), Panamanian footballer
- Eric Davis (rugby union) (1917–2001), rugby union player who represented Australia
- Eric Davis (candidate), Liberal Party candidate in Ontario
- Erik Davis (baseball) (born 1986), baseball pitcher
- Erik Davis (born 1967), writer of Techgnosis
- Eric Davis, musician of the band Blue Cheer
- Eric W. Davis, physicist, ufo researcher, in Advanced Aerospace Threat Identification Program

== See also ==
- Eric Davies (1909–1976), South African cricketer
- Eric Davies (administrator), the Welsh chairman of Rhyl F.C. and Mayor of Rhyl
