= Laura Davis =

Laura Davis or Davies may refer to:

- Laura Davis (swimmer) (born 1984), American female medley swimmer
- Laura Davis (volleyball) (born 1973), American volleyball player
- Laura Davis, a character in Three Moons Over Milford
- Laura Davies (born 1963), English golfer
- Laura Davies (bodybuilder) (born 1960), Canadian bodybuilder
