= Michelle Davis =

Michelle Davis or Michele Davis may refer to:

- Michele Davis, American businessperson and U.S. Department of the Treasury official
- Michele Davis Macfarlane (born 1948), American horse trainer
- Michelle Davis (cook and blogger), wrote five cookbooks under the brand Bad Manners.
- Michelle Davis (politician), winner of the 2020 Indiana House of Representatives election for District 58
- Michelle Davis, an executive producer of the Disney television series So Weird
- Michelle Davis, a character in the 2017 film The Stray

== See also ==
- Michael Davis (disambiguation)
- Michelle Davison (born 1979), American diver
