= Todd Davis =

Todd Davis may refer to:

- Todd Davis (American football) (born 1992), American football player
- Todd Davis (businessman) (born 1968), American entrepreneur
- Todd F. Davis (born 1965), American poet and critic

== See also ==
- Tod Davis (1924–1978), American baseball player
