= Carlos Davis =

Carlos Davis may refer to:

- Carlos Davis (screenwriter) (1948–2020), American screenwriter
- Carlos Davis (American football) (born 1996), American football defensive lineman
