= Ralph Davis =

Ralph Davis may refer to:

- Ralph Davis (American football coach) (1920–2016), college football coach
- Ralph Davis (basketball) (1938–2021), American basketball player
- Ralph Davis (guard) (1922–1992), American football guard
- Ralph C. Davis (1894–1960), American professor of business organization
- R. H. C. Davis (Ralph Henry Carless Davis, 1918–1991), British historian
- Ralph Tipton Davis (1880–1934), American football player
- Ralph Davis (economic historian) (1915–1978), English economic historian
