= Wendy Davis =

Wendy Davies or Davis may refer to:

- Wendy Davis (actress) (born 1966), American actress
- Wendy Davis (politician) (born 1963), American politician
- Wendy Davis (rugby union) (1913–2002), rugby union player who represented Wales
- Wendy Davies (headteacher), British headteacher at Selly Park Technology College for Girls; see the list of dames commander of the Order of the British Empire

== See also ==
- Wendy Davies, professor of history
