= Gloria Davis =

Gloria Davis may refer to:

== People ==
- Major Gloria D. Davis (1959–2006) US Army officer found dead after describing financial improprieties in Iraq
- Gloria Davis (politician) (born 1938), member of the New York State Assembly, convicted of financial impropriety in 2003

== Fictional characters ==
- Gloria Davis, character in Cannibal Ferox
- Gloria Davis, character in Lullaby of Broadway (film)

== See also ==
- Gloria Davy (1931–2012), Swiss singer
