= Henrietta Davis =

Henrietta Davis may refer to:

- Henrietta Davis (politician) (born 1945), mayor of Cambridge, Massachusetts
- Henrietta Vinton Davis (1860–1941), American elocutionist, dramatist, and impersonator
