= Patrick Davis =

Patrick Davis may refer to:

- Patrick Davis (musician) (born 1976), American singer-songwriter, musician, and record producer
- Patrick Davis (politics), American political consultant and strategist
- Patrick Davis (ice hockey) (born 1986), American ice hockey player
