= Emmett Davis =

Emmett Davis may refer to:

- Emmett Davis (basketball) (born 1959), American college basketball coach
- Emmett Davis (sailor) (1886–1967), American sailor who competed in the 1932 Summer Olympics
