= Spencer Davis (disambiguation) =

Spencer Davis (1939–2020) was a Welsh musician.

Spencer Davis may also refer to:

- Spencer Davis (baseball) (1908–1981), American baseball player
- Spencer Davis (racing driver) (born 1998), American stock car racing driver
