= Derek Davis (disambiguation) =

Derek Davis may refer to:

- Derek Davis (1948–2015), Irish broadcaster
- Derek Davis (artist) (1926–2008), English artist
- Derek Russell Davis (1914–1993), British psychiatrist
