= Red Davis (disambiguation) =

Red Davis (1915–2002) was an American baseball player.

Red Davis may also refer to:

- Red Davis (American football) (1907–1988), American football player
- Red Davis (basketball) (born 1932), American basketball player

== See also ==
- Redd Davis (1896–??), Canadian film director
