= Eduardo Tejeira Davis =

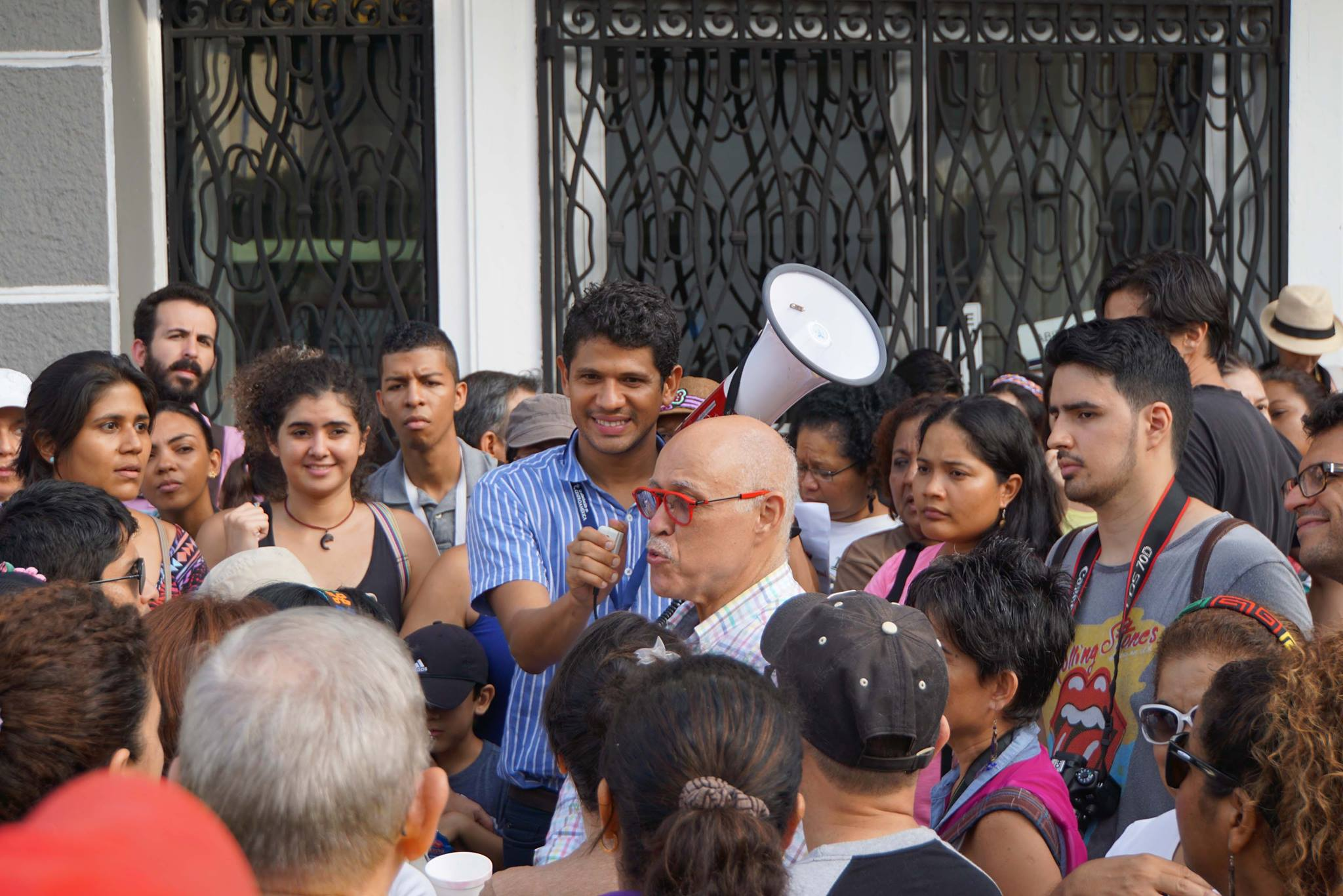
- Davis en la caminata Jane´s Walk en la Avenida Central el 25 de mayo del 2015 en la Avenida Central, organizada por el Municipio de Panamá.
- Born: 1958; Panama City, Panama
- Died: June 22, 2016 (aged 57–58); Panama City
- Resting place: Iglesia de San Lucas
- Education: Heidelberg University
- Alma mater: Technische Universität Darmstadt
- Occupations: architecture professor, historian
- Employer: University of Panama

Eduardo Tejeira Davis (1951 – July 22, 2016) was an architect and historian of architecture from Panama City, Panama.

He was the son of fellow architect Victor Tejeira. He was a graduate of Technische Universität Darmstadt and Heidelberg University, where he earned a doctorate in 1985 in art history, with a specialization in the history of Latin American architecture from s. XIX and XX. . Since 1986 he was a professor of the history of architecture at the University of Panama and Florida State University Panama Branch from 1986 until 2000. Throughout his lifetime, he held various public positions, such as vice-director of Dirección de Patrimonio Historico (1990-1991) Advisor to the Municipal Government of Panama City under the administration of Mayín Correa from (1995-1999) for projects in the historical centre, as well as in the Old Town Office, the National Institute of Culture (INAC), and on the Board of Trustees of Panamá Viejo. In 1988 he was worked for UNESCO as a consultant in Belize to develop the methodology for an inventory of the domestic architecture in the historic downtown Belize City. His professional pursuits included projects such as the restoration of the Iglesia de Natá, Gongora House, the current Panama Canal Museum, and the master plan for the City of Knowledge project in Panama City. Among his publications are articles in the magazine Enciclopedia Panameña para Niños y Jóvenes ("Panamanian Encyclopedia for Children and Young People") and the following academic work:

== Published works ==
- Roots of Modern Latin American Architecture - The Hispano-Caribbean Region from the late XIX Century to the Modern Present (1987)
- Arquitectura doméstica en Panamá, 1640‐1940 (1993)
- El Neocolonial en Centroamérica (1994) by Aracy Amaral (ed.), Arquitectura neocolonial. São Paulo y México,
- La Ciudad de Panamá y sus barrios céntricos”, (1996) by Hans Harms (ed.), Vivir en el “centro”: vivienda e inquilinato en los barrios céntricos de las metrópolis de América Latina
- El Casco Antiguo de Panamá (2001) by Tejeira and Spadafora
- Ensayos sobre conservación y restauración (2004) by Guardiani and Tejeira
- The architecture of the Panama Canal (2001) by Tzonis, Lefaivre and Stagno (eds.), Tropical architecture: critical regionalism in the age of globalization
- La Arquitectura Colonial Hispanoamericana: una Visión Panorámica (2001) by Castillero and Kuethe:Historia General de América Latina, Vol. III, Tomo 2
- Pedrarias Dávila y sus fundaciones en Tierra Firme, 1513‐22 (1996) by Anales del Instituto de Investigaciones Estéticas
- Guía de Arquitectura y del Paisaje (2007)
- El Teatro Nacional, la historia de un icono cultural (2008)
- La Nueva Panamá y la Nueva Guatemala de la Asunción: dos traslados, dos conceptos de ciudad (2008) by Vasco and López (eds.), Territorio, razón y ciudad ilustrada
