= Sydney Davis =

Sydney Davis may refer to:

- Sammy Davis (racing driver) (Sydney Charles Houghton Davis, 1887–1981), British racing motorist, journalist, graphic artist and clubman
- Sydney Davis (Australian politician) (1829–1884), pastoralist and politician in Queensland, Australia
- Sydney Davis (South Dakota politician), member of the South Dakota House of Representatives
