= Marlon Davis =

Marlon Davis may refer to:

- Marlon Davis (American football) (born 1986)
- Marlon Davis (comedian) (born 1983)
