= Buster Davis =

Buster Davis may refer to:

- Buster Davis (composer) (1918–1987), American Broadway theatre composer, songwriter, arranger and conductor, see Doctor Jazz
- Buster Davis (wide receiver) (born 1985), American football wide receiver
- Buster Davis (linebacker) (born 1983), American football linebacker
