= Maury Davis =

American evangelist

Maury Davis is an American evangelist and convicted murderer. Formerly, he was the senior pastor at Cornerstone Church, a megachurch in Madison, Tennessee. He was a regular figure on InFocus, a weekly religious television show broadcast regionally on Nashville NewsChannel 5 CBS Network and via satellite throughout Africa and Europe on the Faith Broadcasting Network. Davis began his religious life after a jailhouse conversion while on trial for murder.

== Killing of Jo Ella Liles ==
On January 27, 1975, when Davis was 18 years old, he stabbed and nearly decapitated Jo Ella Liles, a 54-year old Sunday school teacher. Davis claimed to have had a jailhouse conversion while on trial for her death. Prosecutors were set on putting him to either the electric chair or life in prison. He blamed the killing on insanity, drug use, and the devil, and was eventually found guilty of manslaughter, which carried a maximum sentence of 20 years. While in prison, he began preaching to other prisoners. He ultimately served eight-and-a-half years before being released because of a combination of overcrowding and good behavior.

== Career ==
In 1991, Davis and his wife intended to start a church in Nashville, Tennessee. Rather than pioneering a new start-up church, he was elected as Senior Pastor of a 200-member congregation in the suburbs of the city. After 25 years, he grew the church to almost 5,000 members. Having retired from active involvement he now serves as a public speaker, church consultant, and life coach.

== Personal life ==
Davis has been married since 1985 to his wife Gail who he met at his church in Irving, where she was the pianist. In 1986, they became the parents of triplets, and in 1994 their son was born. They have six grandchildren, a girl and five boys.
