= Clive Davis (disambiguation) =

Clive Davis (1932–2026) is an American record producer.

Clive Davis may also refer to:

- Clive Davis (rugby union) (born 1949), Welsh rugby union footballer
- Clive Selwyn Davis (1916–2009), Australian mathematician
