= Edwin Davis =

Edwin Davis may refer to:

- Edwin Adams Davis (1904–1994), American historian
- Edwin Davis (executioner) (died 1923), New York state executioner
- Edwin Hamilton Davis (1811–1888), American archaeologist who studied the Mound Builders
- Edwin Davis French (1851–1906), Massachusetts book engraver
- Edwin Davis Company, a department store in Kingston-upon-Hull c. 1840–1978
