= Percy Davis =

Percy Davis may refer to:

- Percy Davis (Kent cricketer) (1922–2018), English cricketer who played for Kent County Cricket Club
- Percy Davis (Northamptonshire cricketer) (1915–2011), English cricketer who played for Northamptonshire County Cricket Club
