= Ira Davis =

Ira Davis may refer to:

- Ira Davis (baseball) (1870–1942), infielder in Major League Baseball
- Ira Davis (athlete) (born 1936), American triple jumper
