= Sharon Davis (disambiguation) =

Sharon Davis (born 1954) is an American author who served as first lady of California.

Shar(r)on or Sharen Davis or Davies may also refer to:

- Sharon Davis (composer), classical composer, publisher and widow of the composer William Schmidt
- Sharon Davis (figure skater), Canadian ice dancer
- Sharon K. Davis, American scientist
- Sharon Davis, the 1973 Miss Idaho beauty queen
- Sharon Davis (Marvel Cinematic Universe), a character in the Marvel Cinematic Universe
- Sharon Davies, a character on Neighbours
- Sharron Davies (born 1962), swimmer
- Sharen Davis (born 1957), American costume designer
