= Felix Davis =

English footballer

Personal information
- Date of birth: 10 July 1869
- Place of birth: Hasland, England
- Date of death: 1950 (aged 80–81)
- Position: Full-back

Senior career*
Years	Team	Apps	(Gls)
1887–1888	Brampton Works		
1888–1889	Chesterfield Town		
1889–1890	Brampton Works		
1890–1895	Ilkeston Town		
1895	Nottingham Forest	0	(0)
1898–1897	Grimsby Town	29	(1)
1897–1???	Warmley		
- * Club domestic league appearances and goals

Felix Davis (10 July 1869 – 1950) was an English professional footballer who played as a full-back.
