= Syd Davis =

Australian rules footballer

Personal information
- Full name: Sydney George Davis
- Born: 19 December 1930
- Died: 19 November 2016 (aged 85)
- Height: 183 cm (6 ft 0 in)
- Weight: 83 kg (183 lb)

Playing career^{1}
Years	Club	Games (Goals)
1949–50	South Melbourne	4 (0)
- ^{1} Playing statistics correct to the end of 1950.

Sydney George Davis (19 December 1930 – 10 November 2016) was an Australian rules footballer who played with South Melbourne in the Victorian Football League (VFL).
