= Winston Davis (disambiguation) =

Winston Davis (born 1958) is a West Indian cricketer.

Winston Davis may also refer to:

- Winston Davis (Jamaican cricketer) (1941–1994), Jamaican cricketer
- Winston Davis (Kittitian cricketer) (born 1961), Kittitian cricketer
