= Ruth Davis =

Ruth Davis or Ruth Davies may refer to:

- Bette Davis (1908–1989), American actress née Ruth Davis
- Ruth A. Davis (1943–2025), American diplomat
- Ruth Ann Davis (1936–2009), American educator and academic
- Ruth Davis (1926–1970), American gospel singer with The Davis Sisters
- Ruth E. Davis, American computer scientist
- Ruth M. Davis (1928–2012), American computer scientist and civil servant
- Ruth Davies (born 1965), English actress known professionally as Rudi Davies
- Ruth Davis (basketball) (born 1994), Canadian basketball player (née Ruth Hamblin)
