= Edmund Davis =

Edmund Davis may refer to:

- Edmund J. Davis (1827–1883), American lawyer, soldier, and politician
- Edmund Francis Davis (1845–1889), English solicitor and businessman
- Edmund Davies, Baron Edmund-Davies (1906–1992), British judge.
