= Tyrone Davis (disambiguation) =

Tyrone Davis (1938–2005) was an American blues and soul singer.

Tyrone Davis may also refer to:

- Tyrone Davis (tight end) (1972–2022), American football player
- Tyrone Davis (defensive back) (born 1961), American football player
- Tyrone Davis, reality TV contestant on American series Survivor: Nicaragua
- Tyrone Davis Jr., fictional police officer from U.S. TV series Third Watch, played by Coby Bell
