= Larry Davis =

Larry Davis may refer to:

- Larry Davis (basketball) (born 1956), assistant men's basketball coach at the University of Cincinnati
- Larry Davis (blues musician) (1936–1994), American Texas blues musician
- Larry Davis (New York) (1966–2008), New York City criminal defendant
- Larry M. Davis (1943–2006), American psychiatrist
- Larry S. Davis, American computer scientist
- L. J. Davis (1940–2011) American writer
- Crash Davis (Lawrence Davis, 1919–2001), American professional baseball player
- Larry Davis, the alter-ego of the comic book character Funnyman
