= Lindsay Davis =

Lindsay Davis may refer to:

- Lindsay Davis (figure skater) (born 1992), American figure skater
- Lindsay Davis (model) (born 1985), American model

== See also ==
- Lindsey Davis (born 1949), English novelist, known for the Falco series
- G. Lindsey Davis (born 1948), American bishop
- Linsey Davis, American journalist
