= Margaret Davis =

Margaret Davis may refer to:

- Margaret Davis (paleoecologist) (1931–2024), American paleoecologist
- Margaret Davis (politician) (1933–2022), Australian politician
- Margaret Thomson Davis (1926–2016), Scottish novelist
