= Patricia V. Davis =

American novelist

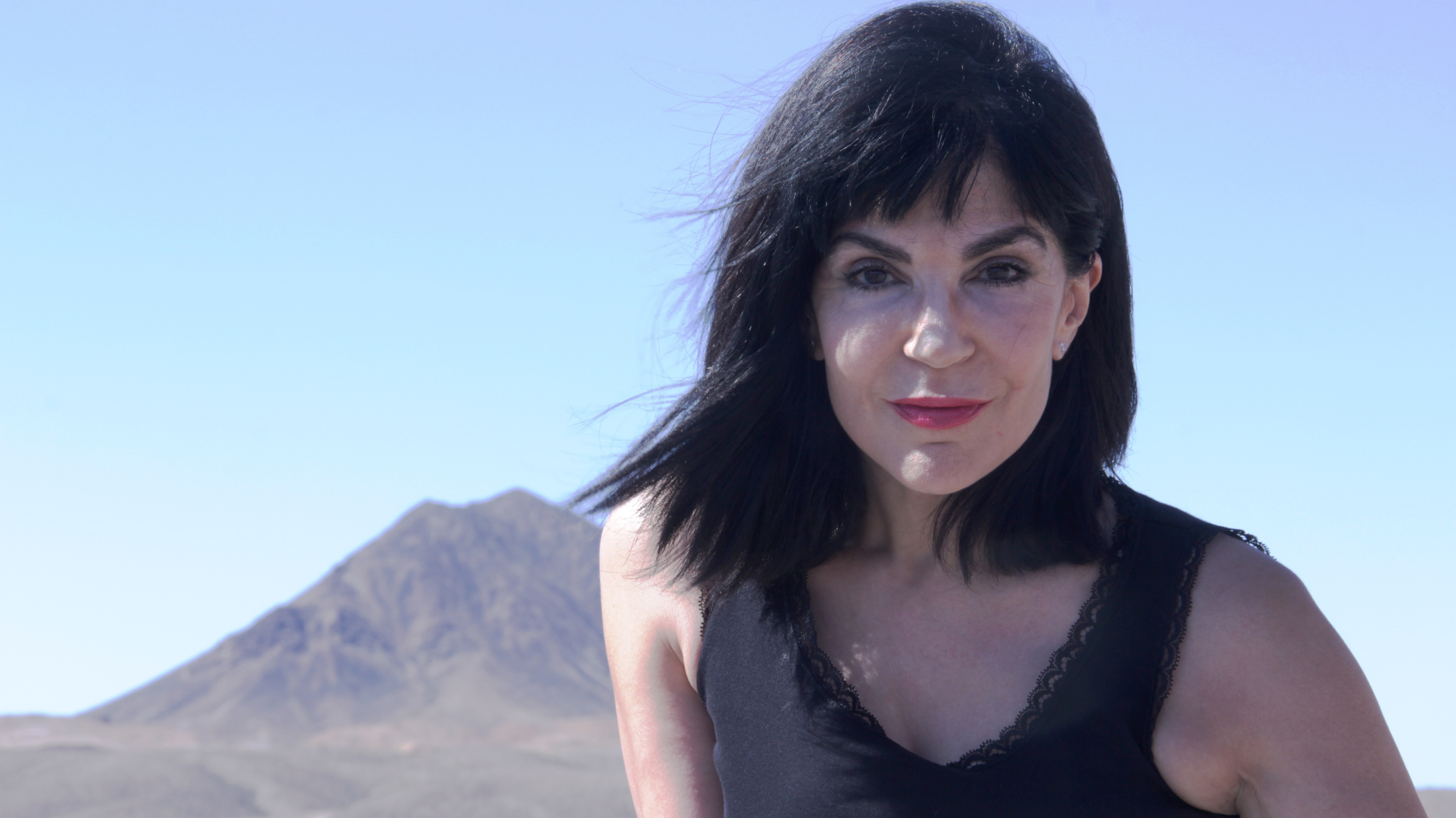
- Born: March 21, 1956 (age 70)
- Education: Queens College, City University of New York; Long Island University CW Post Campus
- Occupations: Writer; screenwriter
- Writing career
- Genres: Non-fiction; fiction
- Website: www.patriciavdavis.com

Patricia V. Davis (born March 21, 1956) is an American writer and screenwriter. She founded the online bipartisan publication Harlots’ Sauce Radio.

== Biography ==
Patricia V. Davis is a graduate of Queens College, City University of New York. She also studied at LIU Post in Brookville, where she added to her existing master's degree in creative writing and education.

She married a Greek national and moved with him to Athens, Greece, where she lived for seven years before returning to the US. Their tumultuous relationship, divorce, and her eventual empowerment led to her memoir: Harlot's Sauce: a Memoir of Food, Family, Love and Loss and Greece.

When a blog post she had written went viral, her second non-fiction book was born, The Diva Doctrine: 16 Universal Principles Every Woman Needs to Know. The book covers everything from appearance, parenthood, break ups with friends, and relating to men.

Davis was invited to attend a women's conference by Maria Shriver, and the only available hotel room was on the RMS Queen Mary. Her experience aboard the ship was the inspiration for The Secret Spice Cafe Trilogy. This series is the ongoing story of four diverse women who meet online and decide to open a restaurant together aboard the historic RMS Queen Mary. It's about food, ghosts, friends, "and long-ago losses that never quite go away."

Davis relocated to the agricultural Sutter County, California, to live near a rice farm which has been owned and operated by her husband's family since the 1800s.

When the COVID-19 pandemic shut down bookshops, she utilized the opportunity to write a screenplay set in the area. Struck by her discovery of serial killings that had been perpetuated in orchards not far from her new rural home, yet in love with the pastoral splendor of the rural area, she came up with a script that comprised both the beautiful and the profane, Lyvia's House, an indie psychological thriller.

Making new connections in her community and reigniting contact with students from her previous life as a teacher, Davis not only wrote the screenplay, she produced it. Directed by Greek filmmaker, Niko Volonakis, it was distributed by StoneCutter Media in 2024. The film sold out screenings, garnered rave reviews, brought recognition to the agricultural community of Nicolaus, California, and was one of 321 qualified films eligible for an Academy Award nomination, along with many other awards.

== Bibliography ==
- Harlot’s Sauce: A Memoir of Food, Family, Love, Loss, and Greece (2008) ISBN 978-0981915302
- The Diva Doctrine: 16 Universal Principles Every Woman Needs to Know (2011) ISBN 978-1599554808
- “Chopin, Fiendishly” (In Tales from the House Band: Volume One 2012) ISBN 978-0984436248
- Cooking for Ghosts: Book I in “The Secret Spice Café Trilogy (2016) ISBN 978-0989905640
- Spells and Oregano: Book II in “The Secret Spice Café Trilogy (2017) ISBN 978-0-9899056-8-8
- Demons Well Seasoned: Book III in "The Secret Spice Cafe Trilogy (2019) ISBN 978-1732064966

== Screenwriting ==
- Lyvia’s House. (2023). [Film] Stonecutter Media.IMDB
