= Jackson Davis =

Jackson Davis may refer to:

- Jackson Davis (actor) (born 1979), American actor
- Jackson B. Davis (1918–2016), American politician
- Jackson Davis (education official) (1882–1947), American educator

== See also ==
- Jaxson Davis
