= Butch Davis (disambiguation) =

Butch Davis (born 1951) is an American football coach.

Butch Davis may also refer to:

- Butch Davis (defensive back) (born 1948), American football defensive back
- Butch Davis (outfielder, born 1958), American baseball player
- Butch Davis (outfielder, born 1916) (1916–1988), American baseball player
