= Leonard Davis =

Leonard Davis may refer to:

- Leonard Davis (American football) (born 1978), American football offensive lineman, 2000–2012
- Leonard Davis (judge) (born 1948), American district court judge in Texas
- Leonard Davis (musician) (1905–1957), American jazz trumpeter
- Leonard Davis, American businessman; founder of Colonial Penn life insurance company
  - Leonard Davis Institute of Health Economics, University of Pennsylvania
  - Leonard Davis School of Gerontology, University of Southern California
