= Reginald Davis =

Reginald or Reggie Davis may refer to:

- Reginald Davis (cricketer) (1892–1957), Australian cricketer
- Reginald Davis (judge) (1881–1948), South African judge
- Reginald Ben Davis (1907–1998), British wildlife artist
- Reggie Davis (tight end) (born 1976), American football coach
- Reggie Davis (wide receiver) (born 1995), NFL wide receiver

== See also ==
- Reginald Davis Johnson (1882–1952), American architect
