= Admiral Davis =

Admiral Davis may refer to:

- Arthur C. Davis (1893–1965), U.S. Navy admiral
- Charles Henry Davis (1807–1877), U.S. Navy rear admiral
- Donald C. Davis (1921–1998), U.S. Navy admiral
- Edward H.M. Davis (1846–1929), British Royal Navy admiral
- George W. Davis VI (born 1938), U.S. Navy rear admiral
- Glenn B. Davis (1892–1984), U.S. Navy vice admiral
- John L. Davis (1825–1889), U.S. Navy rear admiral
- Walter J. Davis Jr. (born 1936), U.S. Navy vice admiral
- William Davis (Royal Navy officer) (1901–1987), British Royal Navy admiral
- William V. Davis (1902–1981), U.S. Navy vice admiral
