= Bruce Davis =

Bruce Davis may refer to:

== Sports ==
- Bruce Davis (offensive tackle) (1956–2021), American football offensive lineman
- Bruce Davis (linebacker) (born 1985), American football linebacker and son of the above offensive lineman
- Bruce Davis (wide receiver) (born 1963), American football wide receiver
- Bruce Davis (Australian footballer) (born 1953), Australian rules footballer

== Others ==
- Bruce Davis (video game industry) (born 1952), American businessman formerly in the video game industry
- Bruce R. Davis (born 1939), Australian electrical engineer
- Bruce M. Davis (1942–2026), American member of the Manson family convicted of the murder of Donald "Shorty" Shea
- Bruce Alan Davis (1948–1988), American serial killer
