= Lauren Davis (disambiguation) =

Lauren Davis (born 1993) is an American tennis player.

Lauren Davis may also refer to:

- Lauren Davis (politician) (born 1986), American politician
- Lauren B. Davis (born 1955), Canadian writer
