= Gene Davis =

Gene or Eugene Davis may refer to:

- Gene Davis (painter) (1920–1985), American painter
- Eugene M. Davis (born 1952), American actor
- Gene Davis (wrestler) (born 1945), American wrestler who represented the United States at the 1976 Summer Olympics
- Gene Davis (politician) (born 1945), Utah politician
- Eugene Davis (doctor) (1870–1946), American doctor and college football coach
- Eugene Davis (Ghost Hunt), a character in the book series
- W. Eugene Davis (born 1936), American judge
- Eugene Davis (writer) (1857–1897), Irish writer
- Eugene Davis (footballer) (1953–2024), Irish footballer
