= Brad Davis =

Brad Davis is the name of:

== Entertainment ==
- Brad Davis (actor) (1949–1991), American actor
- Brad Davis (musician), American country/folk singer-songwriter and guitarist
- Brad Davis (bassist), in band Fu Manchu
- DJ B-Do (Bradley Davis, born 1984), African-American record producer and rapper

== Sports ==
- Brad Davis (running back) (born 1953), American football player
- Brad Davis (American football coach) (born 1980), American football coach
- Brad Davis (basketball) (born 1955), American basketball player
- Brad Davis (baseball) (born 1982), American baseball player
- Brad Davis (soccer) (born 1981), American soccer player
- Brad Davis (rugby, born 1968), Australian rugby league footballer and rugby union coach
- Brad Davis (Australian rules footballer) (born 1972), former Fitzroy footballer
- Brad Davis (rugby league, born 1982), Australian rugby league footballer for the Gold Coast Titans
- Brad Davis (cricketer) (born 1990), Australian cricketer

== Other ==
- Bradley Moore Davis (1871–1957), American botanist
- Brad Davis, a fictional character appearing in the Marvel Comics and the film Spider-Man: Far From Home (2019)

== See also ==
- Bradley Davies (born 1987), rugby union player
