= Dennis Davis (disambiguation) =

Dennis Davis (1949–2016) was an American musician.

Dennis Davis may also refer to:

- Dennis Davis (climber) (1927–2015), British mountaineer
- Dennis Davis (politician) (born 1941), American politician
- Dennis Davis (judge) (born 1951), South African judge
