= Del Davis =

Del Davis may refer to:

- Del Davis (high jumper) (born 1960), American high jumper
- Del Davis (singer), reggae singer of the 1970s
- Del Davis, a character in the film Blues in the Night
