= Ned Davis =

Ned Davis may refer to:

- Edward Bertrand "Ned" Davis (February 10, 1933 – May 24, 2010), a United States District Judge
- Ned Davis (analyst) (born 1945/46), an American financial analyst and finance author
- Ned Davis (politician) (1886 – 10 April 1961), a politician from Queensland, Australia
