= Edgar Davis =

Edgar Davis can refer to:

- Edgar Davis (golfer) (1873–1927), American golfer
- Edgar Davis (sprinter) (born 1940), South African sprinter

== See also ==
- Edgar Davids (born 1973), Dutch-Surinamese former footballer
