= Ryan Davis =

Ryan Davis may refer to:

== Sports ==
- Ryan Davis (defensive end) (born 1989), American football defensive end
- Ryan Davis (wide receiver) (born 1997), gridiron football wide receiver
- Ryan Davis (Australian footballer) (born 1989), Australian rules footballer
- Ryan Davis (musician) (born 1983), German electronica and techno producer
- Ryan Davis (rugby union) (born 1985), English rugby union player
- Ryan Davis (basketball) (born 2000), American college basketball player

== Other uses ==
- Ryan Davis (video game journalist) (1979–2013), writer on video games
- Ryan J. Davis (born 1982), American theater director, writer, political consultant and progressive activist

== See also ==
- Ryan Davies (1937–1977), Welsh entertainer
- Ryan Davies (cricketer) (born 1996), English cricketer
