= Gladys Davis =

Gladys Davis may refer to:

- Gladys Davis (fencer) (1893–1965), British Olympic fencer
- Gladys Davis (baseball) (1919–1991), Canadian baseball player
- Gladys Rockmore Davis (1901–1967), American artist
