= Stephanie Davis =

Stephanie Davis may refer to:

- Stephanie Davis (singer) (fl. from 1993), American singer-songwriter, poet and musician
  - Stephanie Davis, her 1993 self-titled album
- Stephanie Davis (actress) (born 1993), English actress
- Steph Davis (born 1973), American rock climber, BASE jumper and wingsuit flyer
- Stephanie D. Davis (born 1967), American judge
- Stephanie Davis (runner) (born 1990), British runner
- Stephanie Davis (sprinter), winner of the 2019 4 × 400 meter relay at the NCAA Division I Indoor Track and Field Championships

== See also ==
- Steph Davies (born 1987), English cricketer
