= Jeanette Davis =

Marine microbiologist

- Born: Wilmington, Delaware
- Education: Hampton University, University of Maryland
- Scientific career
- Fields: Marine Biology, Microbiology
- Workplaces: National Oceanic and Atmospheric Administration
- Thesis: "Characterization of the bacterial communities associated with two tropical sacoglossan mollusks Elysia rufescens and Elysia crispate"
- Website: https://drjeanettedavis.com/

Jeanette Davis is a marine microbiologist, Policy Analyst for NOAA and children's book author.

== Early life and education ==
Jeanette Davis was born in Wilmington, Delaware, in 1985. Davis discovered her passion for science at an early age. Unlike her siblings, who preferred video games and athletics, Davis loved spending time outside and experimenting. Her parents and school teachers encouraged her natural curiosity and inquisitiveness. By the time she got to high school, she knew that she wanted to pursue science and applied to colleges as pre-med as well as pre-law. However, when she began undergrad at Hampton University in Virginia as a criminology major, she quickly discovered her interest in marine science, though her interest in policy and advocacy remained.

Davis was first exposed to marine research during her first undergraduate summer internship, Multicultural Students at Sea Together. During this research experience Davis spent one month sailing around Chesapeake Bay on a 53-foot sailboat. As an undergraduate student, Davis's favorite courses included meteorology, followed by botany, microbiology, zoology and geology. She graduated from Hampton University in 2008 with a B.S. in Marine and Environmental Science.The Marine Sciences Department at Hampton University equipped Davis with a strong foundation in marine biology.

Davis went on to receive her PhD in marine microbiology from the University of Maryland Center for Environmental Science in 2014, completing her research at the Institute of Marine and Environmental Technology. Davis had initially come to IMET as an intern with NOAA's Living Marine Resources Cooperative Science Center (LMRCSC), which also helped fund her studies at IMET. Her dissertation, "Characterization of the bacterial communities associated with two tropical sacoglossan mollusks Elysia rufescens and Elysia crispate", advised by Russell Hill, focused on tracing an anticancer compound back to its production by a bacterium associated with Hawaiian sea slugs.

== Career ==
Davis lives in Washington, D.C. and works as a Policy Analyst and Invasive Species Coordinator for the National Oceanic and Atmospheric Administration (NOAA). As a policy analyst, Davis conducts research, writes reports and helps guide ocean resource policies. Some of her work is on Omics technologies, which are methods used to analyze DNA, RNA, proteins and metabolites, and creating strategies to integrate them into achieving NOAA's goals. Additionally, Davis serves as the United States representative for two intergovernmental panels, helping promote and create scientific cooperation between different countries and their governments, and has advised the White House on ocean science and technology for the coming decade.

Davis has been working at NOAA since she was paired with the organization's National Marine Fisheries Service for her Sea Grant fellowship in 2015. During this fellowship she helped with sea turtle research and conservation, co-authoring a National Bycatch Report. After she completed her fellowship, she became a Research Associate with the NOAA Fisheries Office of Science and Technology.

=== Public engagement ===
Davis has visited more than a dozen countries and many colleges to talk about ocean science. She has been featured in magazines such as Ebony, Essence, and Black Enterprise, dubbed as the "next great marine scientist". Davis is a strong advocate for community involvement and empowering young people. She has mentored many students in elementary school through college and continues to mentor younger scientists at NOAA. To give back to youth in her hometown of Wilmington, where there are high rates of poverty and homicide, she founded the Marquis Pressey Scholarship. The Marquis Pressey Scholarship honors her cousin who was murdered several years ago and helps African American men through college.

Davis also works to empower and diversify the next generation of scientists, with her children's book, "Science is Everywhere, Science is for Everyone". Her book was featured as the #1 Hot New Release in Children's School Issues on Amazon, and is the first in a series Davis plans to publish.

== Awards and honors ==
- Sea Grant John A. Knauss Marine Policy Fellowship beginning in 2015
- 2020 Technology Rising Star Award from NOAA at the annual Women of Color in STEM conference
- Davis was highlighted with an interview in NOAA Voices: Oral History Archive

== Selected publications ==
- Zan, J., Li, Z., Dianery Tianero, M., Davis, J., Hill, R.T., and M.S. Donia. (2019). A microbial factory for defensive kahalalides in a tripartite marine symbiosis. Science 364:eaaw6732. doi:10.1126/science.aaw6732
- Montalvo, N.F., Davis, J., Vincente, J., Pittiglio, R., Ravel, J., and R.T. (2014). Integration of Culture-Based and Molecular Analysis of a Complex Sponge-Associated Bacterial Community. PLOS ONE 9(3): e90517. https://doi.org/10.1371/journal.pone.0090517
- Davis, J., Fricke, F., Hamann, M.T., Esquenazi, E., Dorrestein, P.C., and R.T. Hill. (2013). Characterization of the Bacterial Community of the Chemically Defended Hawaiian Sacoglossan Elysia rufescens. Applied and Environmental Microbiology 79 (22) 7073-7081; doi:10.1128/AEM.01568-13
- Davis, J. (2020). Science is Everywhere, Science is for Everyone. Atlanta, Georgia: Mynd Matters Publishing. ISBN 978-1948145671
- Goodwin, K., Certner, R., Strom, M., Arzayus, F., Bohan, M., Busch, S., Canonico, G., Cross, S., Davis, J., Egan, K., Grieg, T., Kearns, E., Koss, J., Larsen, K., Layton, D., Nichols, K., O'Neil, J., Parks, D., Poussard, L., and C. Werner. (2020). NOAA 'Omics White Paper: Informing the NOAA 'Omics Strategy and Implementation Plan. National Oceanic and Atmospheric Administration. doi:10.25923/bd7z-zb37
- Goodwin, K., Davis, J., Strom, M., and C. Werner. (2020). NOAA 'Omics Strategy: Strategic Application of Transformational Tools. National Oceanic and Atmospheric Administration, Office of Oceanic and Atmospheric Research, National Marine Fisheries Service. https://nrc.noaa.gov/LinkClick.aspx?fileticket=RReWVFNjr5I%3d&tabid=92&portalid=0
