= Guy Davis =

Guy Davis may refer to:

- Guy Davis (comics) (born 1966), American comic book artist
- Guy Davis (musician) (born 1952), American blues guitarist and musician
