= Allison Davis =

Allison Davis may refer to:

- Allison Davis (anthropologist) (1902–1983), American anthropologist
- Allison Davis (television executive) (born 1953), American television executive
- Allison S. Davis, American lawyer
