= Scot Davis =

American wrestling coach

Scot Davis is the former wrestling head coach and gym teacher at Owatonna High School in Minnesota. He is the current record holder for most wins in national high school wrestling history with over 1,200 wins. Davis is a graduate of, and was an All-American wrestler and team captain at, Augsburg College-Minneapolis, Minnesota.
