= Martha Davis =

Martha Davis may refer to:

- Martha Davis (author) (born 1957), American professor of law and author
- Martha Davis (musician) (born 1951), American lead singer-songwriter of the new wave band The Motels
- Martha Davis (singer) (1917–1960), American vocalist and pianist who performed as "Martha Davis and Spouse"
- Martha Ellen Davis, American anthropologist and ethnomusicologist
