= Graeme Davis =

Graeme or Graham Davi(e)s may refer to:

- Graeme Davis (game designer) (born 1958), role-playing games author, and novelist
- Graeme Davis (mediaevalist) (born 1965), academic medievalist
- Graeme Davies (1937–2022), New Zealand engineer and academic
- Graham Davis (born 1953), Australian journalist
- Graham Davis (racing driver)
- Graham James Davies (1935–2023), British Anglican priest
