= Delbert Dwight Davis =

American comparative anatomist and museum curator

Delbert Dwight Davis (30 December 1908 – 6 February 1965), usually mentioned in literature as D. Dwight Davis, was an American comparative anatomist and curator of zoology at the Chicago Natural History Museum.

Davis was born in Rockford, Illinois and was educated at North Central College, Naperville. In 1930, he joined the Chicago Natural History Museum as an assistant in osteology under Wilfred Osgood. He became a curator of anatomy in 1941. He published on a range of zoological taxa from insects to mammals. He took a special interest in identifying the evolutionary relationships of the giant panda to other mammals using anatomical studies. He took over 25 years on the study and published a comprehensive book on the topic just a couple of months before his death. He visited Borneo in 1950 on a collection expedition and visited Malaya in 1962 where he worked for 9 months at the University in Kuala Lumpur. Along with Rainer Zangerl, he was involved in translating Willi Hennig's influential work on phylogenetics into English which was published in 1966.

Davis married Charlotte and they had a son, Charles Darwin Davis.

== Works ==
- Davis DD (1964). "The Giant Panda: A Morphological Study of Evolutionary Mechanisms". Fieldiana: Zoology Memoirs. 3: 1–399.
- Schmidt KP, Davis DD (1941). Field Book of Snakes of the United States and Canada. New York: G.P. Putnam's Sons. 365 pp., 34 plates, 103 figures.
