= Wallace Ray Davis =

Wallace Ray Davis (December 3, 1949 – February 16, 2007), born in San Antonio, Texas, is best known as a Christian Television Pioneer having created and built the largest religious media agency in the world called Affiliated Media Group. With over 130 ministries represented he was known by many in the industry as a master architect of success in the world of broadcast Evangelism.

== Early life ==
Ray Davis was born in San Antonio, Texas to Herbert Wallace Davis and Aaron Karr. His father who was a soldier in the U.S. Air Force deployed and the family moved to Tripoli Libya, Africa when Ray was thirteen. In 1968 he was a Freshman at Lee College in Nashville, TN. and left school to marry Sylvia Katrina Webber and received his draft notice for the U.S. Army leading to a deployment to Okinawa. In 1978, he married Elizabeth Mary Zimmer.

== Ministries represented ==
Ray Davis' firm Affiliated Media Group located in Jacksonville, Florida, represented over 130 ministries including:

- Benny Hinn Ministries
- Joel Osteen Lakewood Church
- Larry Jones - Feed the Children

== Death ==
Davis died on February 16, 2007, in Jacksonville, Florida, from kidney failure after complications from a fifteen-month bout with cancer. Television coverage of the funeral was broadcast by First Coast News Channel 25 in Jacksonville, Florida. In 1992, Davis suffered a near-death heart attack and would later receive a heart transplant after being diagnosed with cardiomyopathy in 1997. Ray Davis is survived by 6 children, 19 grandchildren and one great-grandchild.
