= Suzanne Davis =

Suzanne Davis may refer to:

- Suzanne Davis (actress) (born 1978), American comedian and actress
- Suzanne Davis (figure skater) (1912–1991), American figure skater
- Suzanne Allison Davis, president of Greenville University
