= Norm Davis =

Australian rules footballer, born 1904

Personal information
- Full name: Norman Joseph Davis
- Born: 4 August 1904; Port Melbourne, Victoria
- Died: 26 August 1966 (aged 62); Port Melbourne, Victoria

Playing career^{1}
Years	Club	Games (Goals)
1927	North Melbourne	2 (1)
- ^{1} Playing statistics correct to the end of 1927.

Norman Joseph Davis (4 August 1904 – 26 August 1966) was an Australian rules footballer who played with North Melbourne in the Victorian Football League (VFL).
