= Taylor Davis =

Taylor Davis may refer to:

- Taylor Davis (artist) (born 1959), American artist and teacher
- Taylor Davis (violinist) (born 1987), American violinist, arranger, and composer
- Taylor Davis (baseball) (born 1989), American baseball catcher
