= Bing Davis =

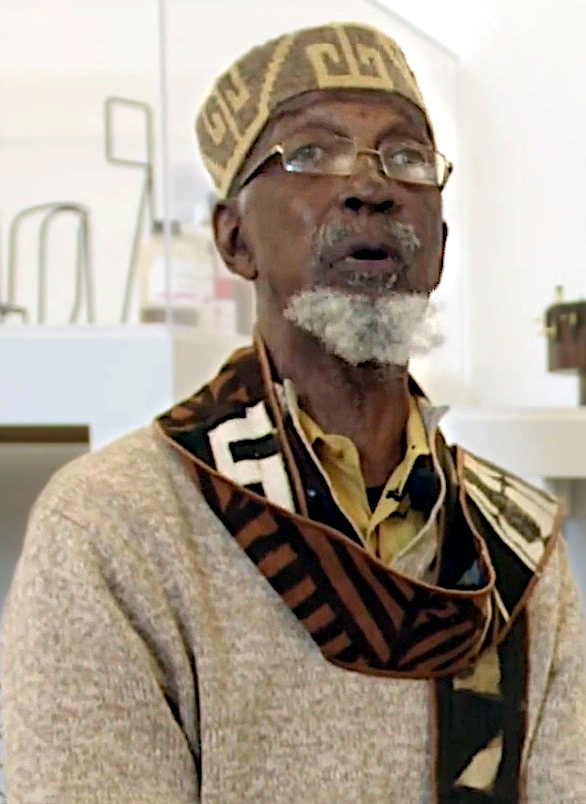
Bing Davis at the Contemporary Dayton, Ohio, 2023

Willis "Bing" Davis (born June 30, 1937) is an American artist and educator, notable for his contributions to African American art and culture.

== Early life and education ==
Willis "Bing" Davis was born in Greer, South Carolina, on June 30, 1937. His mother, Verona Hargrove Davis Buffington, and his father, Livonia “Lee” Davis, would later move their family to Dayton, Ohio, when Davis was an infant.

During his childhood, Davis attended Washington Elementary School within Dayton Public Schools. In 1951, he would attend Wilbur Wright High School and was involved in basketball and track. In 1955, he enrolled at DePauw University, where he played collegiate basketball and majored in art education until he graduated in 1959.

Davis later pursued higher education at the Dayton Art Institute and attend Miami University for his master's degree, which he earned in 1967. He then studied at Indiana State University from 1975 to 1976.

== Teaching Career ==
After his undergraduate graduation, Davis would teach art at Colonel White High School in the Dayton Public School system, resulting in the decision that he would be furthering his education.

Davis became involved in the Living Arts Center, a Title III-funded arts education program through Dayton Public Schools.

After the program lost funding, he returned to DePauw University as Assistant Dean of Art and coordinator of Black Studies as DePauw's first full-time Black faculty member. While employed at DePauw University, Davis became an active member of the National Conference of Artists, serving as vice president in 1973 and president in 1979.

Davis would return to Miami University after being appointed assistant dean of the graduate school and associate professor of art. He also was a ceramics instructor at Central State University before becoming the head of the Art Department.

Davis retired from teaching in 1988.

== Art & Influence ==
Following his retirement from teaching, Davis founded the Willis Bing Davis Art Studio & EbonNia Gallery in Dayton, Ohio, working on international art projects in Russia, Bermuda, China, and Ghana.

Davis works primarily with found objects and mixed media, though he has also created photography, drawings, paintings, ceramics, and sculptures. He considers clay his most expressive medium due to its direct physicality. His art is influenced by African and African American textiles, featuring recurring triangle motifs inspired by African quilts and architecture.

Many of his works are in public and private collections worldwide, with exhibitions at the Studio Museum in Harlem, Renwick Gallery, and African Craft Museum, among others.

A lifelong advocate for Black students, Davis created the Skyscrapers Project, commissioning local African American artists to paint portraits of high-achieving Black professionals for display in Dayton Public Schools.

== Honors & Legacy ==
Davis was inducted into the DePauw University Sports Hall of Fame. In 2001, he showed at the Indianapolis Art Center.

In 2010, University of Dayton held a celebration exhibition.

In 2023, Davis donated his personal archives to the University of Dayton Archives and Special Collections. The university celebrated the donation in 2024 with an exhibition and public event, supporting the PBS/ThinkTV documentary Willis “Bing” Davis: Reach High & Reach Back.
