= Lyn Davis =

NZ international rugby union player

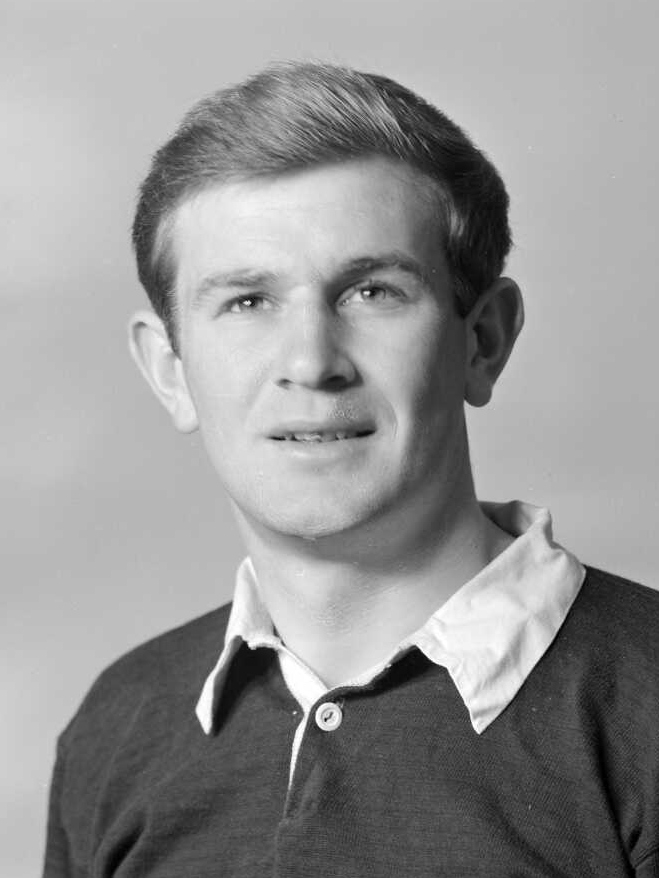
- Born: Lyndon John Davis; 22 December 1943 Christchurch, New Zealand
- Died: 27 June 2008 (aged 64) Christchurch, New Zealand
- Height: 1.80 m (5 ft 11 in)
- Weight: 83 kg (183 lb)
- School: Cashmere High School
- Occupation: Market gardener

Rugby union career
- Position: Halfback
Provincial / State sides
Years	Team	Apps	(Points)
1964–77	Canterbury	167	
International career
Years	Team	Apps	(Points)
1976–77	New Zealand	3	(0)

Lyndon John "Lyn" Davis (22 December 1943 – 27 June 2008) was a New Zealand rugby union player. A halfback, Davis represented Canterbury at a provincial level, and was a member of the New Zealand national side, the All Blacks, from 1976 to 1977. He played 16 matches for the All Blacks including three internationals.
