= Charles Davis =

Charles or Charlie Davis may refer to:

== Arts and entertainment ==
- Charles Davis (saxophonist) (1933–2016), American jazz saxophonist
- Charles Davis (flute player) (born 1946), American jazz flautist
- Charles Crawford Davis (1893–1966), American audio engineer and innovator
- Charles Edward Davis (1827–1902), English architect and antiquarian
- Charles Harold Davis (1856–1933), American landscape painter
- Charles Davis (actor) (1925–2009), Irish character actor
- Charles Michael Davis (born 1981), American actor and model
- Charles Belmont Davis (1866–1926), writer, drama critic, and publisher
- Charles K.L. Davis (1925–1991), Native Hawaiian opera singer and musician
- Charlie Davis, American bandleader of The Charlie Davis Orchestra
- The real name of the Scorpio Killer in Dirty Harry (1971)
- Charles T. Davis (poet), poet and journalist from Arkansas

== Law and politics ==
- Charles Davis (land purchase agent) (c. 1818 – 1887), New Zealand interpreter, writer and land purchase agent
- Charles B. Davis (1877–1943), U.S. federal judge
- Charles H. Davis (judge) (1906–1976), Illinois Supreme Court and Illinois Appellate Court justice
- Charles Russell Davis (1849–1930), U.S. representative from Minnesota
- Charles R. Davis (Minnesota politician, born 1945), American educator and member of the Minnesota Senate
- Charles Augustus Davis (1828–?), Wisconsin state assemblyman
- Charles W. Davis (politician) (1827–1912), Wisconsin state senator
- Greg Davis (Mississippi politician) (Charles Gregory Davis, born 1966), mayor of Southaven, Mississippi
- Charles Davis (Australian politician) (1884–1959), South Australian politician
- Charles Davis (warden), American warden of Sing Sing
- Charles Davis (Vermont judge) (1789–1863), Vermont attorney and judge
- Charlie Davis (politician) (born 1965), member of the Missouri House of Representatives
- Charles J. Davis (1910–1968), Michigan politician
- Sir Charles Davis, 1st Baronet (1878–1950), Lord Mayor of London
- Charles E. Davis Jr. (born 1932), member of the Florida House of Representatives
- Charles H. S. Davis (1840–1917), American physician, philologist and orientalist; member of the Connecticut House of Representatives.

== Military ==
- Charles Henry Davis (1807–1877), U.S. naval officer
- Charles C. Davis (1830–1909), American Medal of Honor recipient
- Charles P. Davis (1872–1943), American Medal of Honor recipient
- Charles W. Davis (1917–1991), U.S. Army officer and Medal of Honor recipient

== Sports ==
=== American football ===
- Charlie Davis (defensive tackle) (born 1951), former American football defensive tackle
- Charlie Davis (running back) (born 1952), American football player
- Charles Davis (defensive back) (born 1964), American college football player and television commentator
- Charles Davis (tight end) (born 1983), American football player

=== Basketball ===
- Charlie Davis (basketball) (born 1949), American basketball player
- Charles Davis (basketball, born 1958), American basketball player
- Charles Davis (basketball, born 1984), naturalized Azerbaijani basketball player

=== Other sports ===
- Charlie Davis (footballer) (1904–1967), English professional footballer
- Charlie Davis (baseball) (1927–2016), American baseball player
- Charles Davis (sport shooter) (1927–2018), American Olympic sport shooter
- Charlie Davis (cricketer) (1944–2026), West Indian cricketer
- Charles Davis (American athlete) (born 1993), American visually-impaired runner
- Charles Davis (boxer) (born 1980), American boxer

== Other people ==
- Charles Henry Davis (civil engineer) (1865–1951), American businessman and civil engineer
- Charles H. Davis (fl. 1890), gold prospector at Golden Fleece Mine, Colorado
- Charles Davis (theologian) (1923–1999), British Jesuit theologian, famous for publicly leaving the Catholic Church in 1966
- Charles Till Davis (1929–1998), American medieval historian
- Charles Thomas Davis (1873–1938), British civil servant
- Charles William Davis (born 1947), American serial killer
- Charles Henry Davis (bishop) (1815–1854), English Benedictine bishop of the Catholic Church

== Other uses ==
- Charles Davis (department store), a department store company in Hobart, Tasmania

== See also ==
- Chuck Davis (disambiguation)
- Charles Davies (disambiguation)
