= Charles T. Davis =

Charles T. Davis may refer to:

- Charles Till Davis, American medieval historian
- Charles Thomas Davis, British civil servant
- Charles T. Davis (poet), poet and journalist from Arkansas

== See also ==
- Charles Davis (disambiguation)
