= Auckland Town Hall =

Historic civic building in Auckland CBD

Coordinates: 36°51′10″S 174°45′49″E

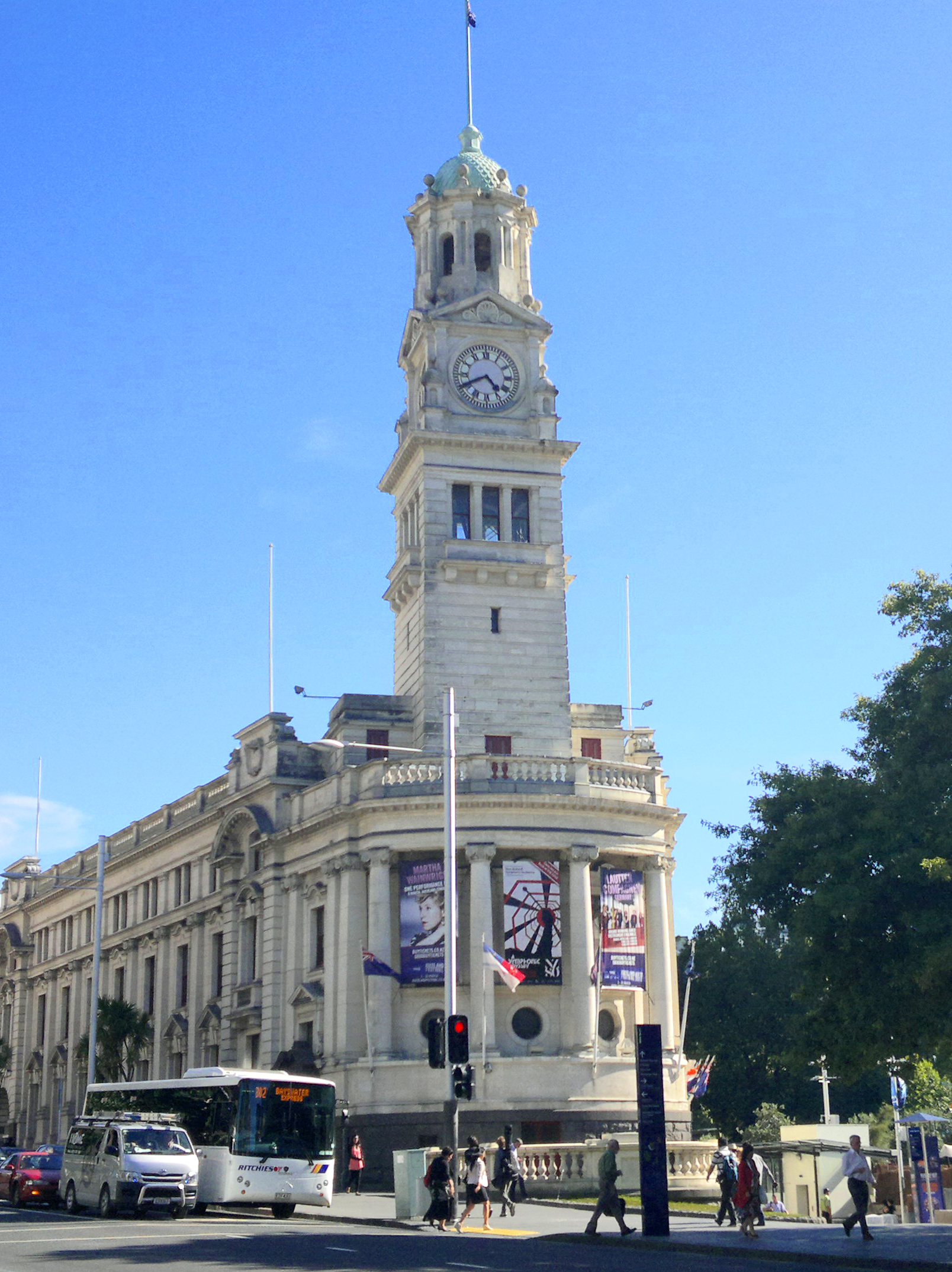
- Exterior of venue viewed from Queen Street

General information
- Type: Civic
- Architectural style: Italian Renaissance Revival
- Location: Auckland CBD, 305 Queen Street, Auckland, New Zealand
- Construction started: 1909; 117 years ago
- Inaugurated: 14 December 1911; 114 years ago
- Renovated: 1994-97
- Cost: £126,000
- Renovation cost: $32.8 million
- Owner: Auckland Council

Height
- Height: 45 m (148 ft)

Design and construction
- Architect: J Clark and Sons

Renovating team
- Structural engineer: Sinclair Knight Merz
- Civil engineer: Downer Group

Other information
- Seating capacity: 1,529 (Great Hall); 431 (Concert Chamber)

Heritage New Zealand – Category 1
- Designated: 27 July 1988; 38 years ago
- Reference no.: 549

The Auckland Town Hall is an Edwardian building on Queen Street in the Auckland CBD, New Zealand, known both for its original and ongoing use for administrative functions (such as Council meetings and hearings), as well as its famed Great Hall and separate Concert Chamber. Auckland Town Hall and its surrounding context is highly protected as a 'Category A' heritage site in the Auckland District Plan, registered by Heritage New Zealand as a Category I Historic Place.

== History ==
=== Building ===
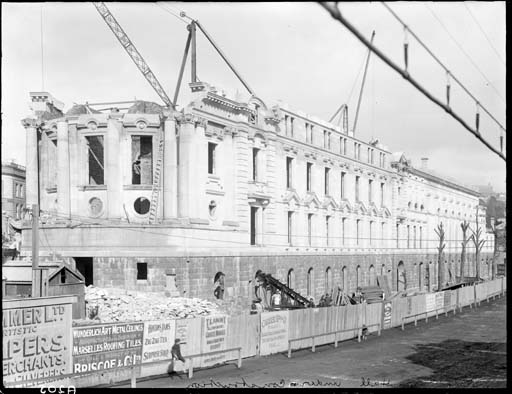
The Auckland Town Hall under construction, c. 1910

Since as early as 1872, there were plans to create a town hall for the city of Auckland. The corner of Greys Avenue and Queen Street was chosen as the location in 1880, and the corner was requisitioned by a formal act of parliament, the Auckland Reserves Exchange and Change of Trust Act 1881. The area proved to be too small, so the municipal government purchased the adjoining properties in 1883. A design competition for the building was held in 1908, which was won by Melbourne-based architects JJ & EJ Clark.

Construction began after the foundation stone was laid by mayor Arthur Myers on 24 February 1909, and the building was officially opened on 14 December 1911 by Lord Islington, Governor of New Zealand. It is one of the most prominent heritage structures on Queen Street. Costing £126,000 (approximately $21 million in 2017) to construct, the building was constructed of Oamaru limestone, with a Melbourne bluestone base, and incorporates a 40-metre high clocktower. The five-storey Italian Renaissance Revival design bears a resemblance to the Lambeth Town Hall at Brixton, London, built at around the same time. The Town Hall formed Auckland's first permanent seat of both administration and entertainment in the city's history, with its Great Hall (seating 1,673 people) modelled on the Gewandhaus in Leipzig, and considered as having among the finest acoustics in the world.

Auckland residents had mixed opinions of the building after it was constructed, with some likening it to a cheese wedge or a flat iron.

The exterior is constructed of two types of stone; the ground floor is made of a dark volcanic basalt, heavily rusticated, which contrasts with the pale stonework of the upper storeys. Oamaru limestone from the south island was used for the upper part of the building. The lower part is often assumed to be Auckland basalt but was actually sourced from Melbourne, in Australia. This was probably due to the architects already having a history of sourcing consistently good quality stone from the quarries there, as well as the availability of heavy duty steam saws to handle the notoriously difficult stone.

The boxing events of the 1950 British Empire Games were held in the hall, with a capacity of 3,000 for the events.

The interior contains several varieties of English ceramic surfaces – tessellated floors and glazed ceramic wall tiles. The semi-circular Council Chamber is fitted with wood panelling and Art-Nouveau-style electric light fittings, while stained glass is a feature of all the main rooms. The ceilings throughout all the main floors are ornamented with good quality plasterwork, the Great Chamber being the most elaborate. The great four-sided clock in the building's tower was donated by Arthur Myers (MP and former Auckland mayor) and the Great Hall's pipe organ by Sir Henry Brett. The Town Hall project was championed by Myers before and during his time as mayor (1905–1909), and one of his last acts in office was to lay the foundation stone.

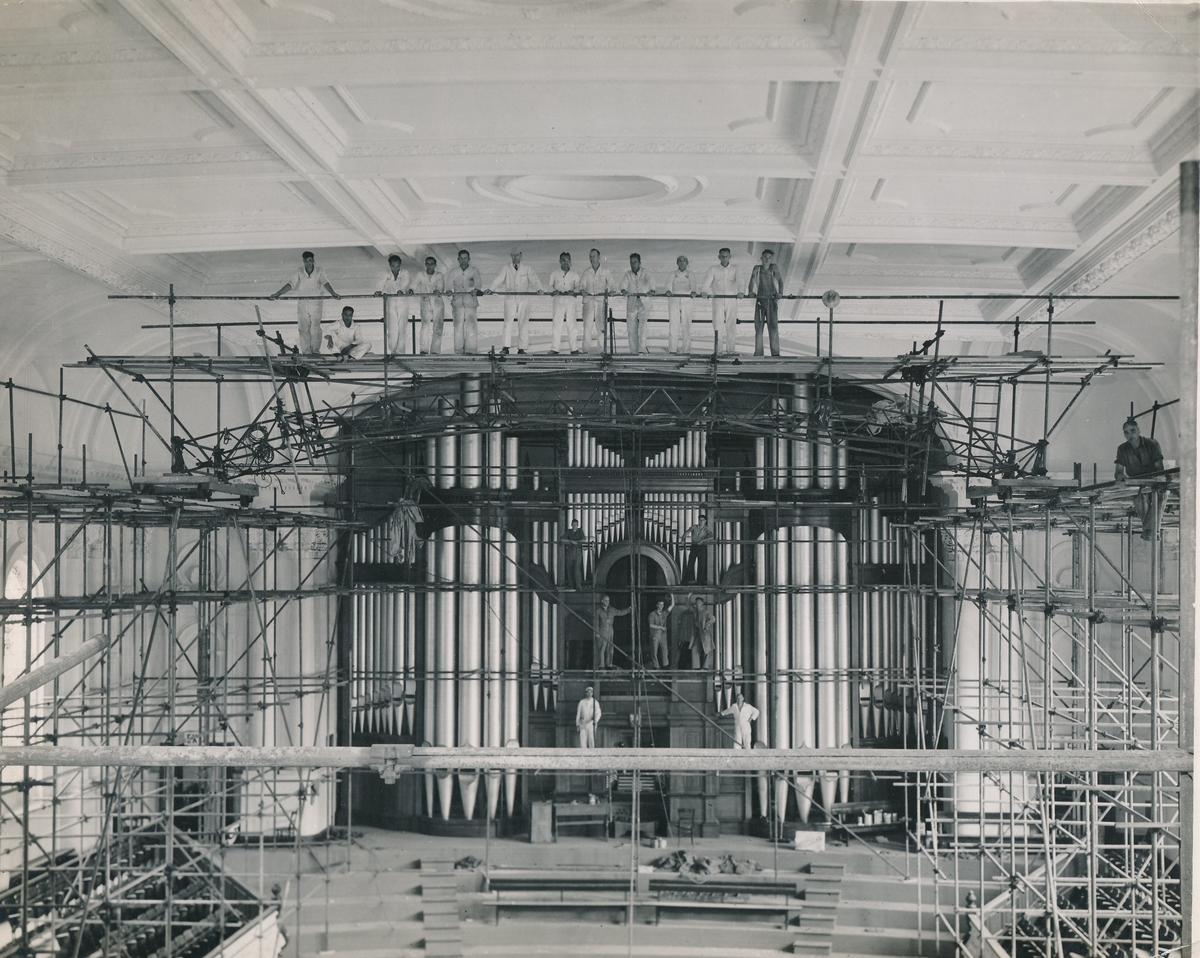
Auckland Town Hall under restoration using tubular steel, circa 1960.

Between 1957 and 1960 alterations were made to offices in the Town Hall, and a carved wooden sound reflector was added to the main auditorium to improve acoustics. The Town Hall's interior was extensively restored from 1994–1997 at a cost of NZ$33 million, partially because the unreinforced masonry structure did not meet earthquake standards. Australian engineering firm Sinclair Knight Merz pioneered various techniques to reinforce the structure without substantially changing the heritage character of the building.

In 2007, the exterior underwent additional restoration work. A number of ornamental details on the exterior had been removed in the 1950s due to earthquake concerns, and some of the Oamaru limestone was damaged during aggressive stone cleaning. After careful research and analysis, these were replaced by limestone sourced from the same levels of the North Otago quarry that provided the original stone. Interior acoustic performance was corrected by the removal of earlier ill-judged and obtrusive intervention measures and their replacement by less-visible and more effective treatments. Interior paintwork was restored throughout to the original Edwardian-era colours. Complex fragmented porcelain and glazed ceramic tiling was restored with exact, new purpose-made replicas in the lavish main entrance foyer. The original carpet was recreated (for reference, a small portion of the original was left in one corner of the Council Chamber). The stained glass windows were restored and (where necessary), rebuilt and the entire building was unobtrusively fire protected.

=== Town Hall Organ ===
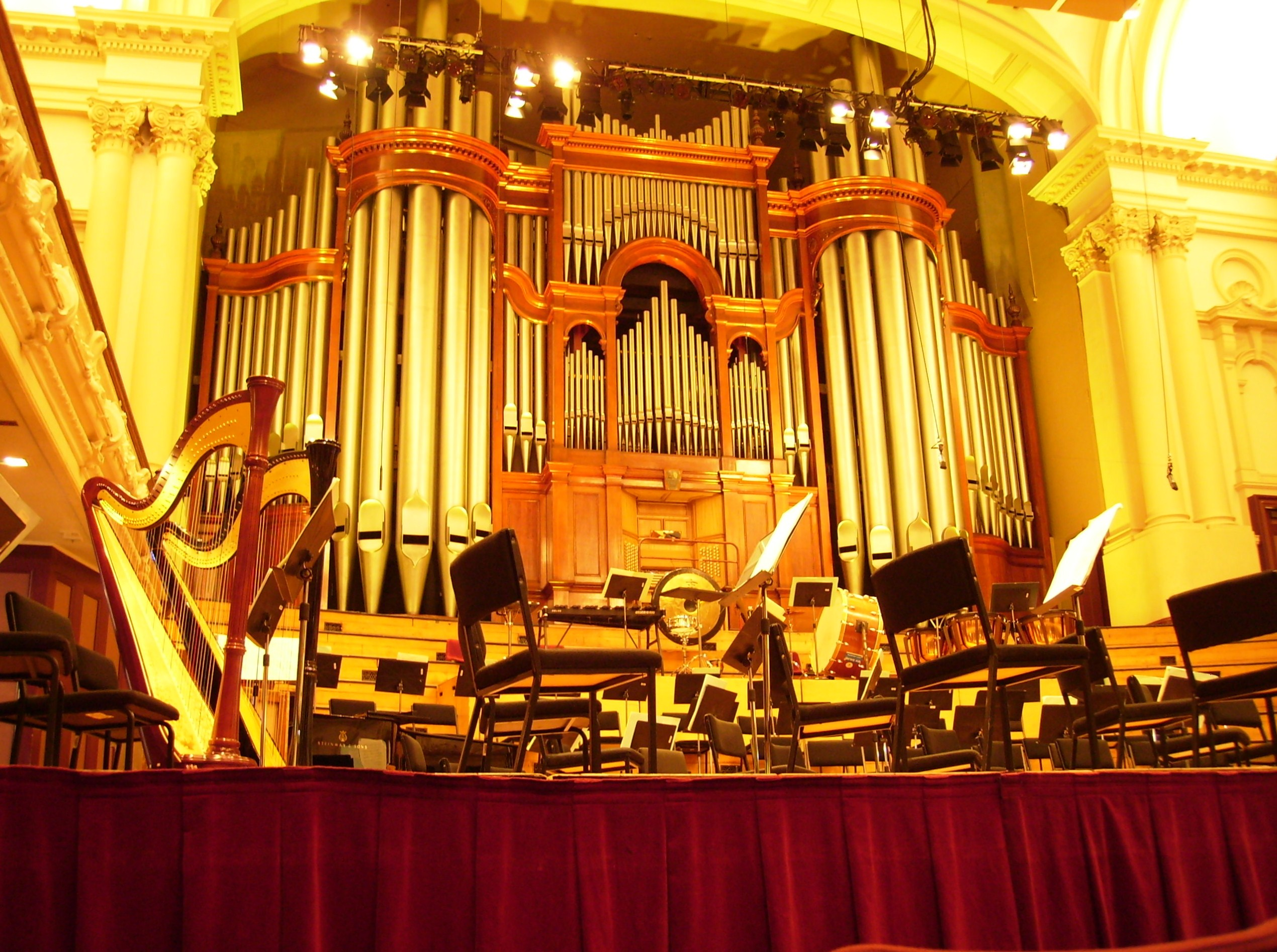
The organ after the restoration in 2010

The Town Hall Organ, dating from 1911, is the largest musical instrument in the country, and is itself a 'Protected Object' in New Zealand law. It was funded by former mayor of Auckland Henry Brett, designed by English organist Edwin Lemare and constructed by Norwich pipe organ manufacturer Norman and Beard.

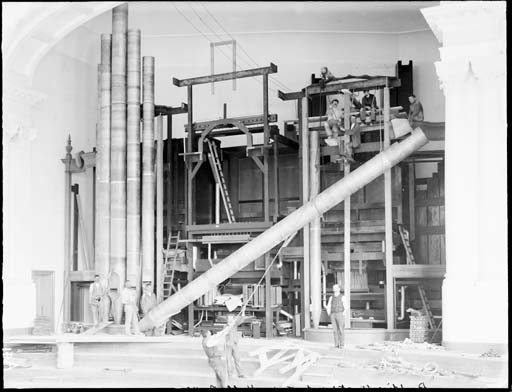
The Town Hall organ under construction, c.1910

It was extensively remodelled in 1969–1970 when the organ reform movement reached New Zealand, significantly altering and reducing its original Romantic-era power, discarding many parts of the original, and adding new ones to produce a then-fashionable Baroque sound. The resulting compromised instrument was dismantled in January 2008 for restoration and rebuilding. The rebuilt organ, incorporating remaining parts of the 1911 original, some recently recovered components, and new elements, was built by Orgelbau Klais of Bonn, Germany. It returned to the Great Hall at the end of 2008, and was reassembled as the country's largest (and once again most powerful), organ.

Auckland City had committed itself to providing NZ$3 million to the restoration project, with a $500,000 remainder obtained via private fundraising. The restored organ was officially unveiled on 21 March 2010, with a specially commissioned symphony.

=== Auckland Philharmonia ===
In early February 2016, the administration staff of New Zealand's largest metropolitan orchestra, the Auckland Philharmonia, moved into the vacant former mayoral office suite, making Auckland Town Hall, where the orchestra largely performs, its new home.

== Gallery ==
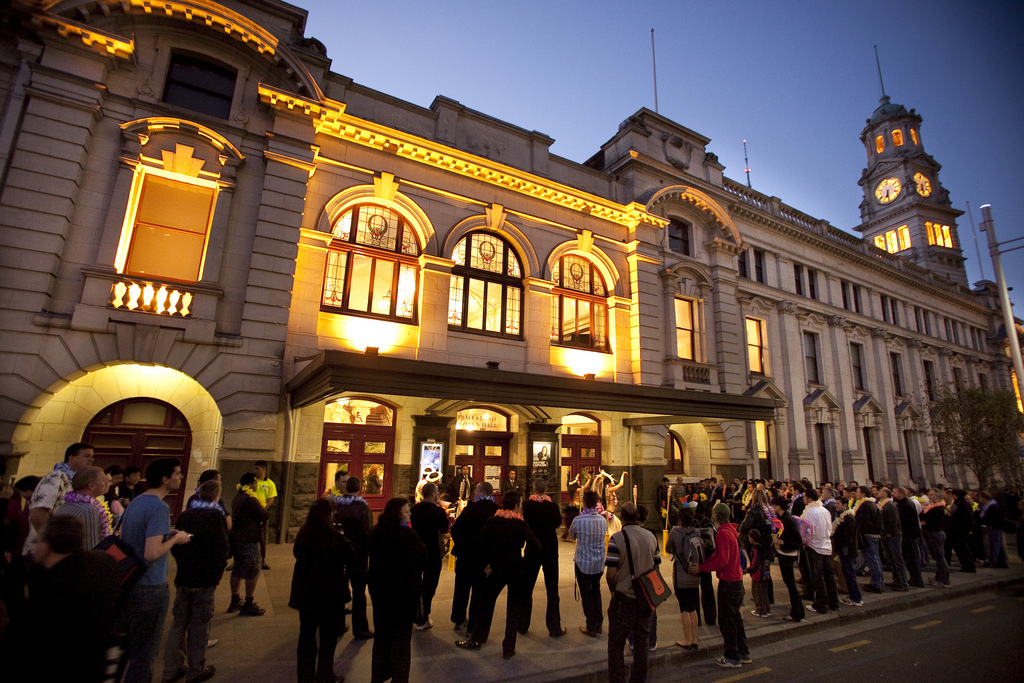
Town Hall entrance from Queen Street

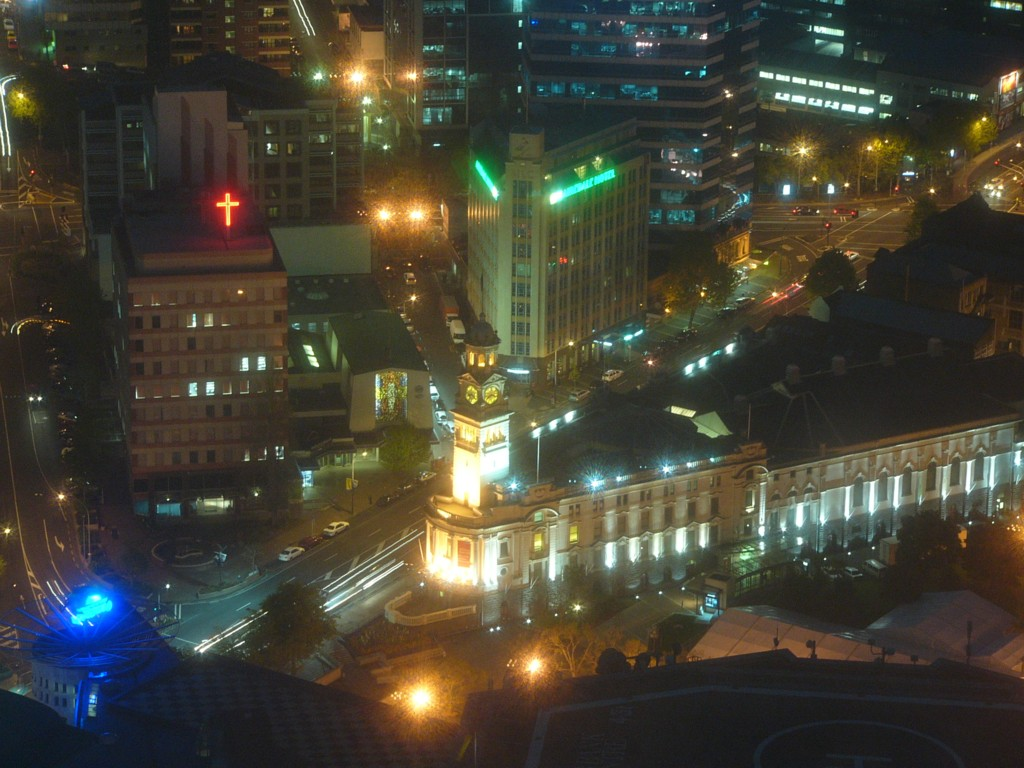
Overhead view of the Town Hall at night

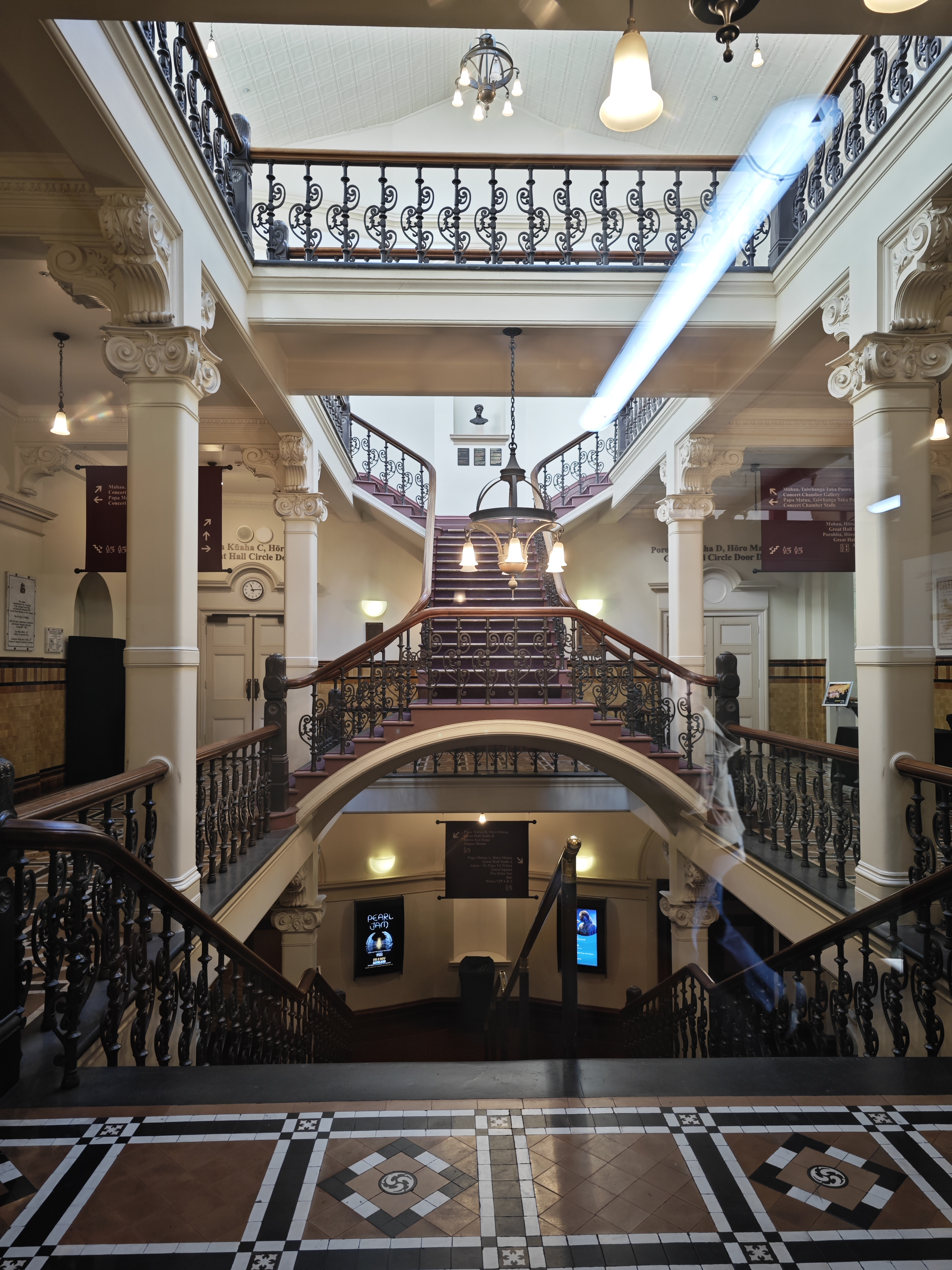
from the door of Auckland Town Hall
