= Charles Davies =

Charles Davies may refer to:

- Charles Davies (athlete), British athlete
- Charles Davies (Tasmanian politician) (1847–1921), member of the Tasmanian Legislative Council
- Charles Davies (South Australian politician) (1813–1888), member of the South Australian Legislative Council
- Charles Lynn Davies (born 1929), Welsh rugby union player
- Charles Maurice Davies (1828–1910), Anglican clergyman, author and spiritualist
- Charles Davies (professor) (1798–1876), American mathematics professor at United States Military Academy
- Charles Davies (Baptist minister) (1849–1927), Welsh Baptist minister
- Charlie Davies (born 1986), American soccer player
- Charlie Davies (rugby union) (born 1990), English rugby union scrum half
- Chick Davies (basketball) (1900–1985, Charles Robinson Davies), American college basketball coach

== See also ==
- Charles Thomas-Davies
- Charlie Deakin Davies, British musician
- Charles Davis (disambiguation)
