= Placid Burchall =

English Benedictine Abbot

Richard Placid Burchall OSB
- Titular Abbot of Westminster Abbey
- Other post: President of Order of Saint Benedict

Orders
- Ordination: 1836

Personal details
- Born: Richard Burchall; December 4, 1810 Aspull, Lancashire, United Kingdom
- Died: March 7, 1885 (aged 74) Woolton, Liverpool, United Kingdom
- Denomination: Catholic

Richard Placid Burchall (4 December 1810 – 7 March 1885) was a Benedictine abbot who was President of Order of Saint Benedict in England for almost three decades. He was appointed the first Bishop of Maitland but refused the appointment.

== Early life ==
Burchall was born in Aspull, Lancashire on 4th of December 1810, to James and Adelaide Burchall. He entered the Order of St Benedict in 1832 in Douai, France.

== Priesthood ==
Burchall was ordained to the priesthood in 1836. In 1839, he was Superior of the Anglo-Benedictine Monastery of Saint Edmond in Douai, France. In 1855, he returned to England and was elected President General of the Order. He served in St Mary's Church, Woolton from 1855 to 1861, and from 1873 to 1885, helping to lead the construction of the church. His younger brother, James Wilfred Burchall (1818-1866) also became a priest and fellow member of the O.S.B.

=== Appointment as Bishop of Maitland ===
On 16 April 1847, Archbishop John Bede Polding, Archbishop of Sydney, wrote to the Prefect of the Congregation, Cardinal Giacomo Filippo Fransoni to petition for the erection of an episcopal see at Maitland, recommending Burchall as a suitable candidate as bishop for the new diocese.

On 9 July 1847, the Holy See announced Burchall would become the first Bishop of Maitland and also be Coadjutor Bishop of Sydney. Burchall refused the appointment on grounds of ill-health, however correspondence from Polding to the Holy See suggested it was instead because the order had refused to lose another priest of such high calibre.

On 14 September 1847, a decree was issued releasing Burchall from the appointment, and appointing Charles Henry Davis (another English Benedictine) in his place.

== Death ==
Burchall passed away on 7 March 1885 at the age of 74. He was buried in the vault at St Mary's Church, Woolton.
