= Our Lady of the Annunciation Church, Liverpool =

Our Lady of the Annunciation Church
- Our Lady of the Annunciation Bishop Eton
- Bishop Eton Monastery
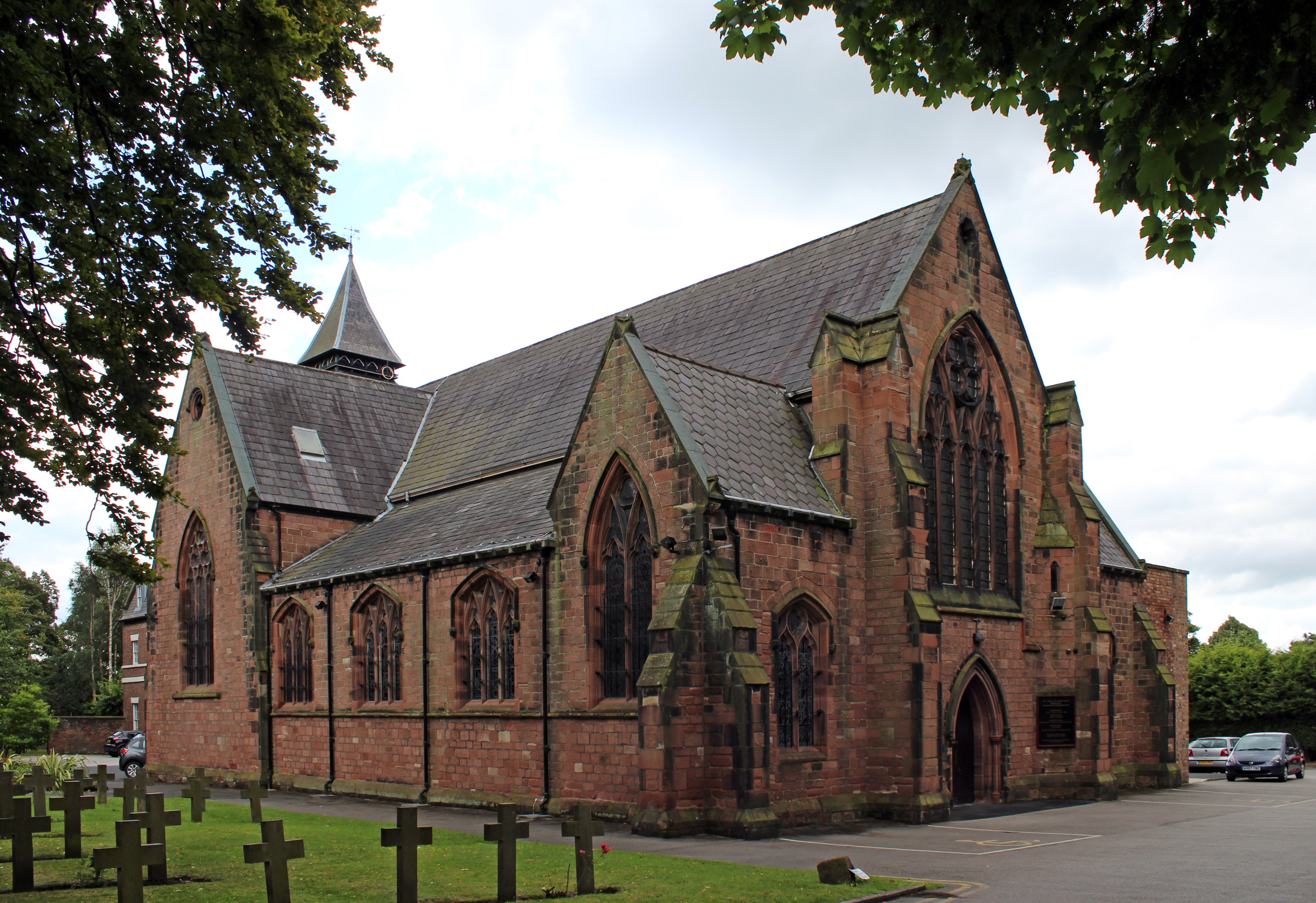
- Our Lady of the Annunciation Church
- 53.389°N 2.895°W
- OS grid reference: SJ 40573 88389
- Location: Childwall, Liverpool
- Country: England
- Denomination: Catholic
- Website: www.bishopeton.org.uk

History
- Status: Active
- Founded: 10 June 1851
- Founder: Redemptorists
- Dedication: Saint Mary

Architecture
- Heritage designation: Grade II* listed
- Designated: 12 July 1966
- Architect: E. W. Pugin
- Groundbreaking: 1857
- Completed: 1858

Administration
- Archdiocese: Liverpool
- Deanery: Liverpool
- Parish: Our Lady of the Annunciation

Clergy
- Rector: Fr A Burns CSsR
- Priest: Fr T Buckley CSsR

Our Lady of the Annunciation Church is a Catholic parish church next to Bishop Eton Monastery in Childwall, Liverpool. It was built from 1857 to 1858 by the Redemptorists and was designed by E. W. Pugin. It is on the Woolton Road, opposite the Hope Park campus of Liverpool Hope University and close to Our Lady's Bishop Eton Primary School. It is a Grade II* listed building.

== History ==
=== Foundation ===
The building housing the Bishop Eton monastery was built in 1776. It was intended by its owner, Unitarian minister Hezekiah Kirkpatrick, to be a school that would rival Eton College. After the closure of the school, it became a private residence. In 1843, the building was bought for two Catholic priests and cousins, James Sharples and George Brown. Sharples would become the bishop of the Apostolic Vicariate of the Lancashire District and Brown would become the first Catholic Bishop of Liverpool. As they were bishops, the building was called Bishops' Eton. They built a chapel next to the building. It was designed by Augustus Pugin. In 1851, after the death of Sharples a year earlier, the Redemptorists were invited to buy the house, and it became a community of Redemptorist priests, Bishop Eton Monastery.

=== Construction ===
In 1857 the Redemptorists replaced the chapel with Our Lady of the Annunciation Church. It was built from 1857 to 1858 and designed by Pugin's son, E. W. Pugin. In 1865 and 1866 further additions were made to the church. A high altar and tabernacle, both designed by John Francis Bentley, were installed. He also designed the pulpit and triptych, which was installed in 1889. The stained glass in the west window was designed by Charles Eamer Kempe. The stained glass in the north chapel depicting Our Lady of the Annunciation was made by Hardman & Co.

=== Developments ===
In 1961, the church became a parish church. In 1973 a fire destroyed part of the church. In 2011, the Redemptorists were asked to serve the nearby parish of St Mary's Church, Woolton, which they continued to do until 2025.

== Parish ==
Up until 2025, the Redemptorists of Bishop Eton served both parishes of St Mary's Church, Woolton and Our Lady of the Annunciation.

Sunday Masses are at 8:30am, 10:00am and 6:00pm, and there are Masses at 12 noon from Monday to Saturday.

The parish is also linked with the nearby Our Lady's Bishop Eton Primary School.

== Exterior and grounds ==
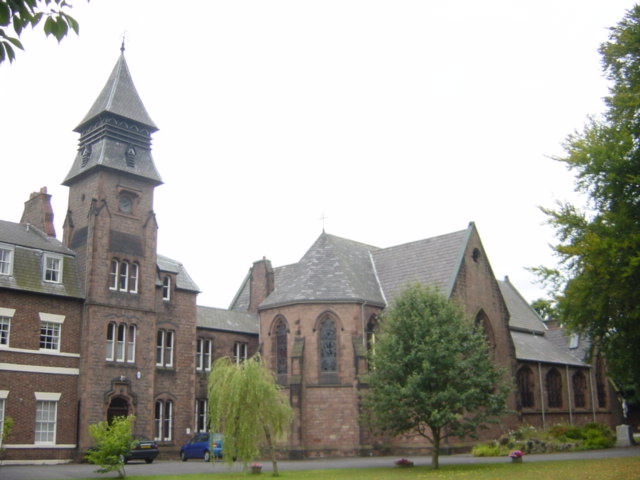
Bishop Eton Monastery

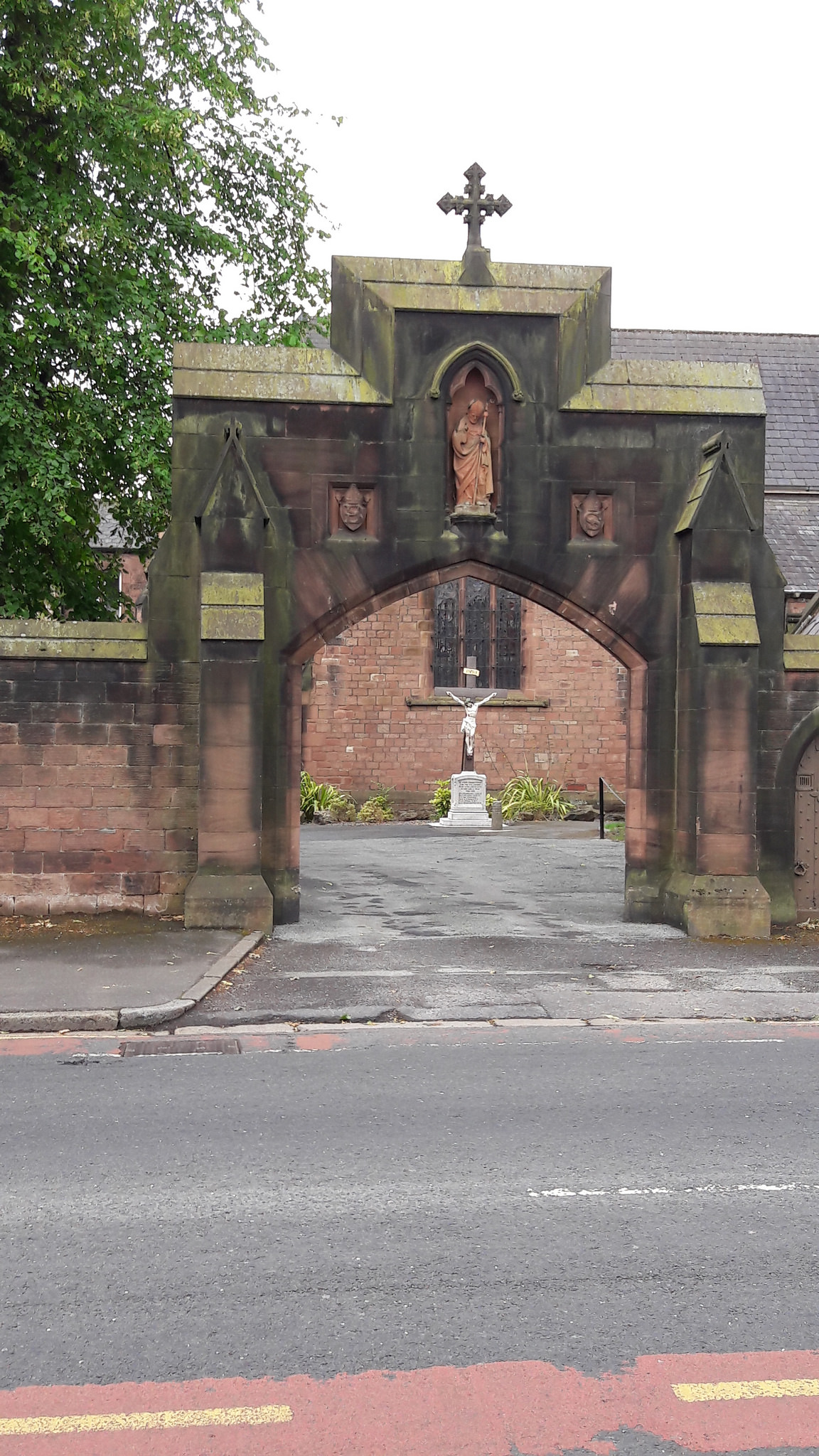
Entrance

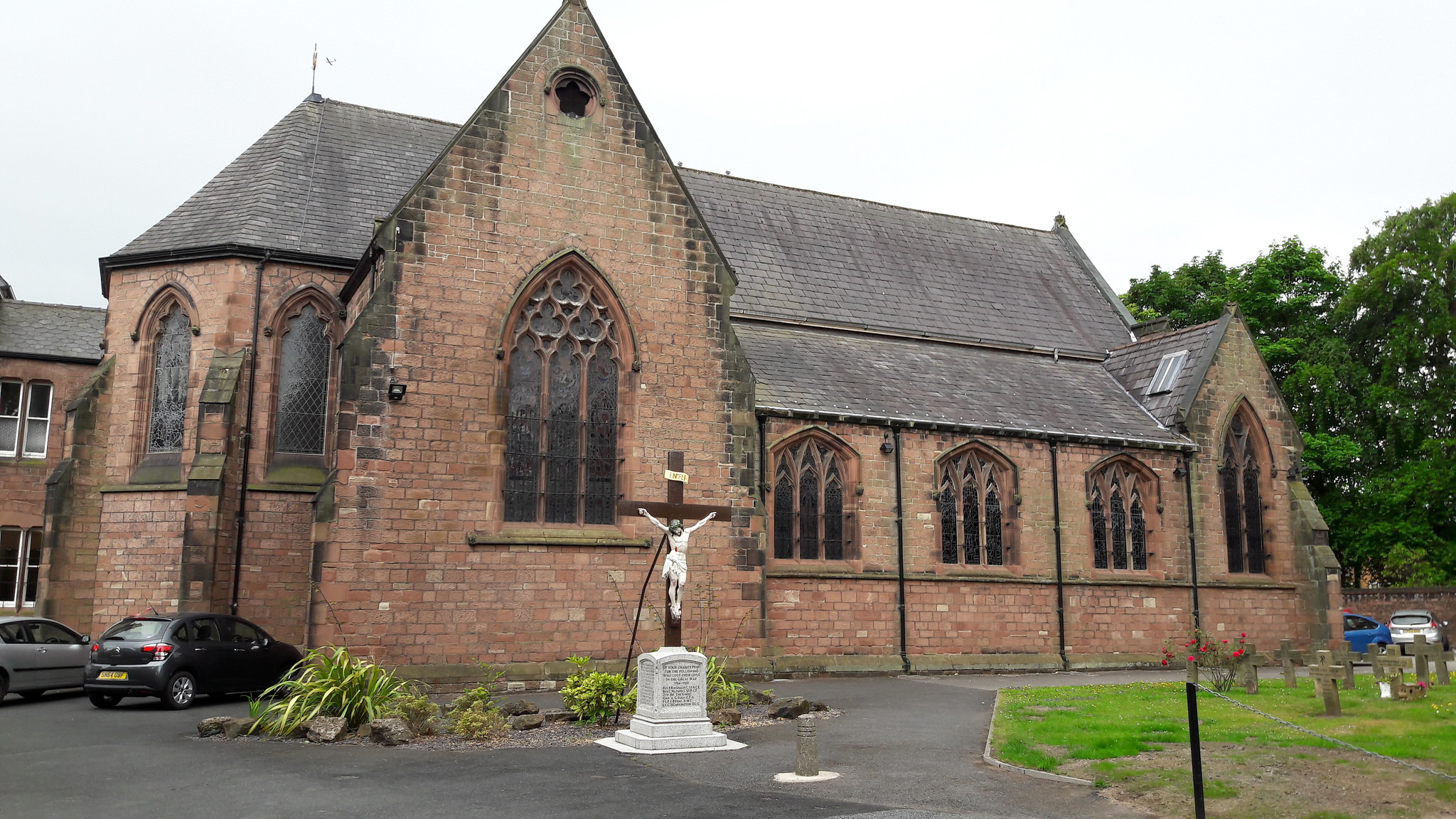
Church and war memorial

== See also ==
- Erdington Abbey
- Grade II* listed buildings in Liverpool – Suburbs
