= St Mary's Church, Woolton =

Church in Merseyside, England

Coordinates: 53.3751°N 2.8704°W

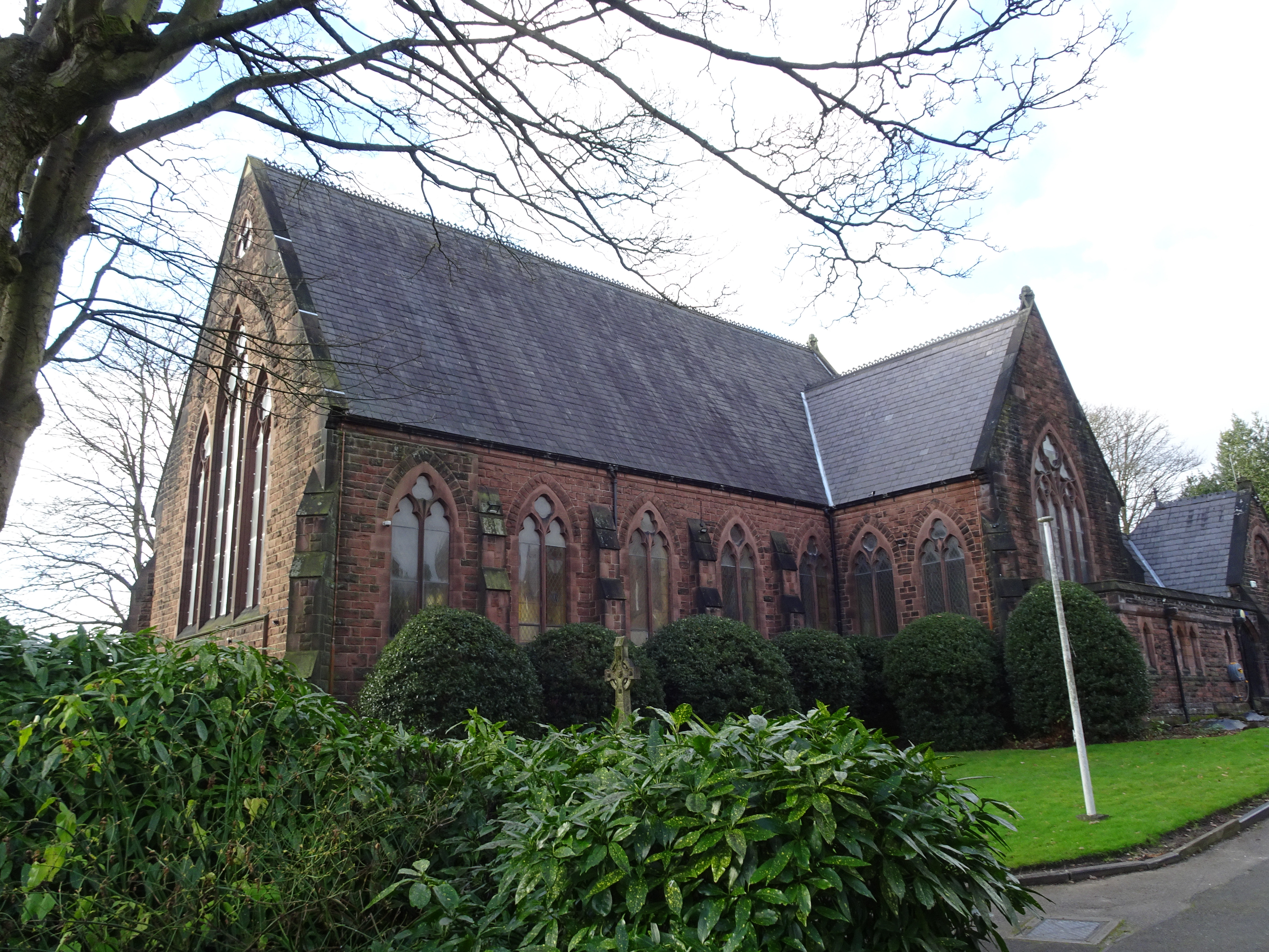
- St. Mary's from the east.

- Location in Merseyside
- OS grid reference: SJ 422 868
- Location: Church Road, Woolton, Liverpool, Merseyside
- Country: England
- Denomination: Roman Catholic
- Website: St Mary's, Woolton

History
- Status: Parish church
- Consecrated: 9th September 1950

Architecture
- Functional status: Active
- Heritage designation: Grade II
- Designated: 19 June 1985
- Architect: R. W. Hughes
- Architectural type: Church
- Style: Gothic Revival
- Groundbreaking: 1859
- Completed: 1860

Specifications
- Materials: Sandstone, slate roof

Administration
- Archdiocese: Archdiocese of Liverpool
- Deanery: Liverpool South

Clergy
- Priest: Rev Fr Peter McGrail

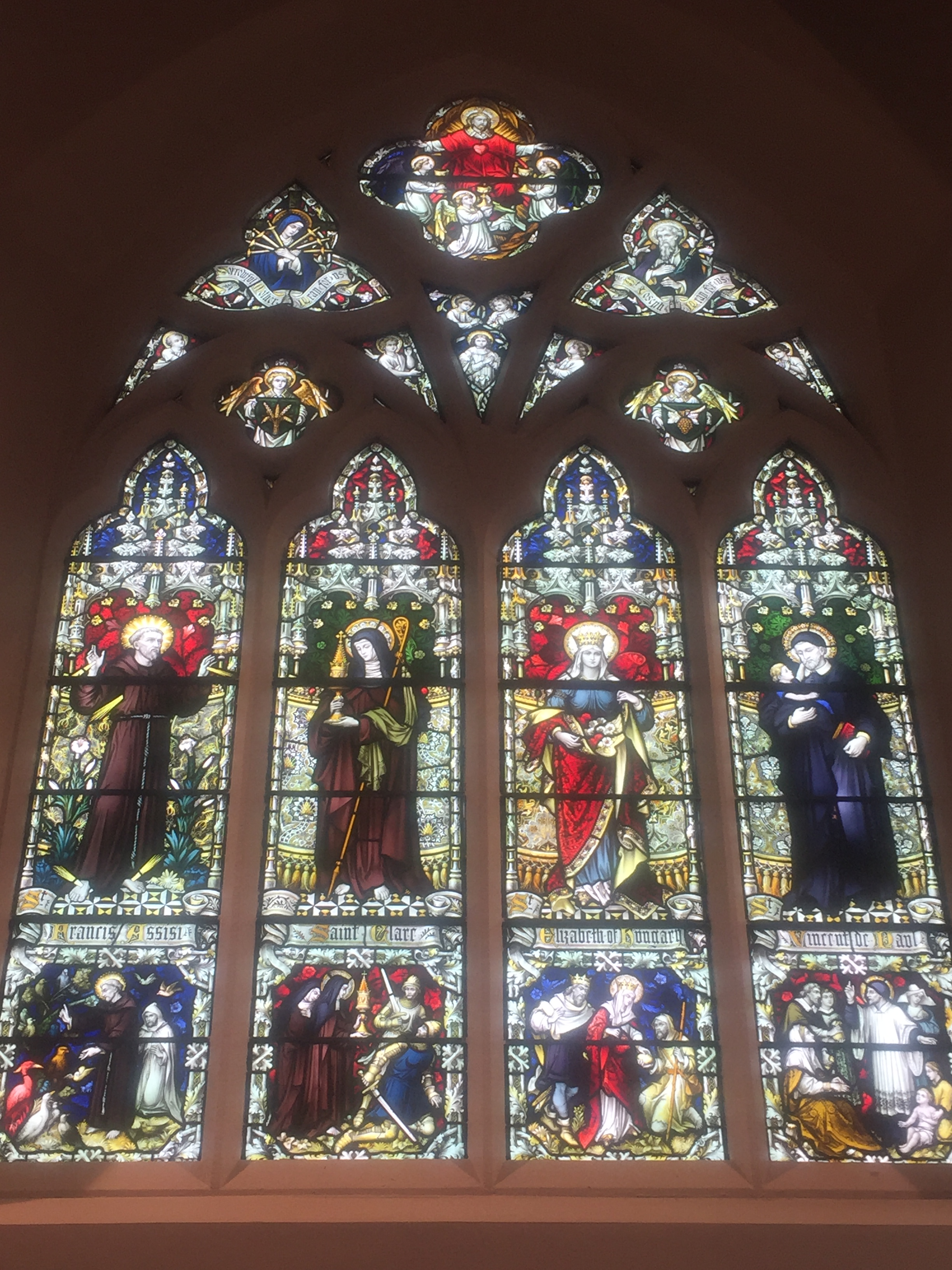
Stained glass depicting various saints and episodes from their lives.

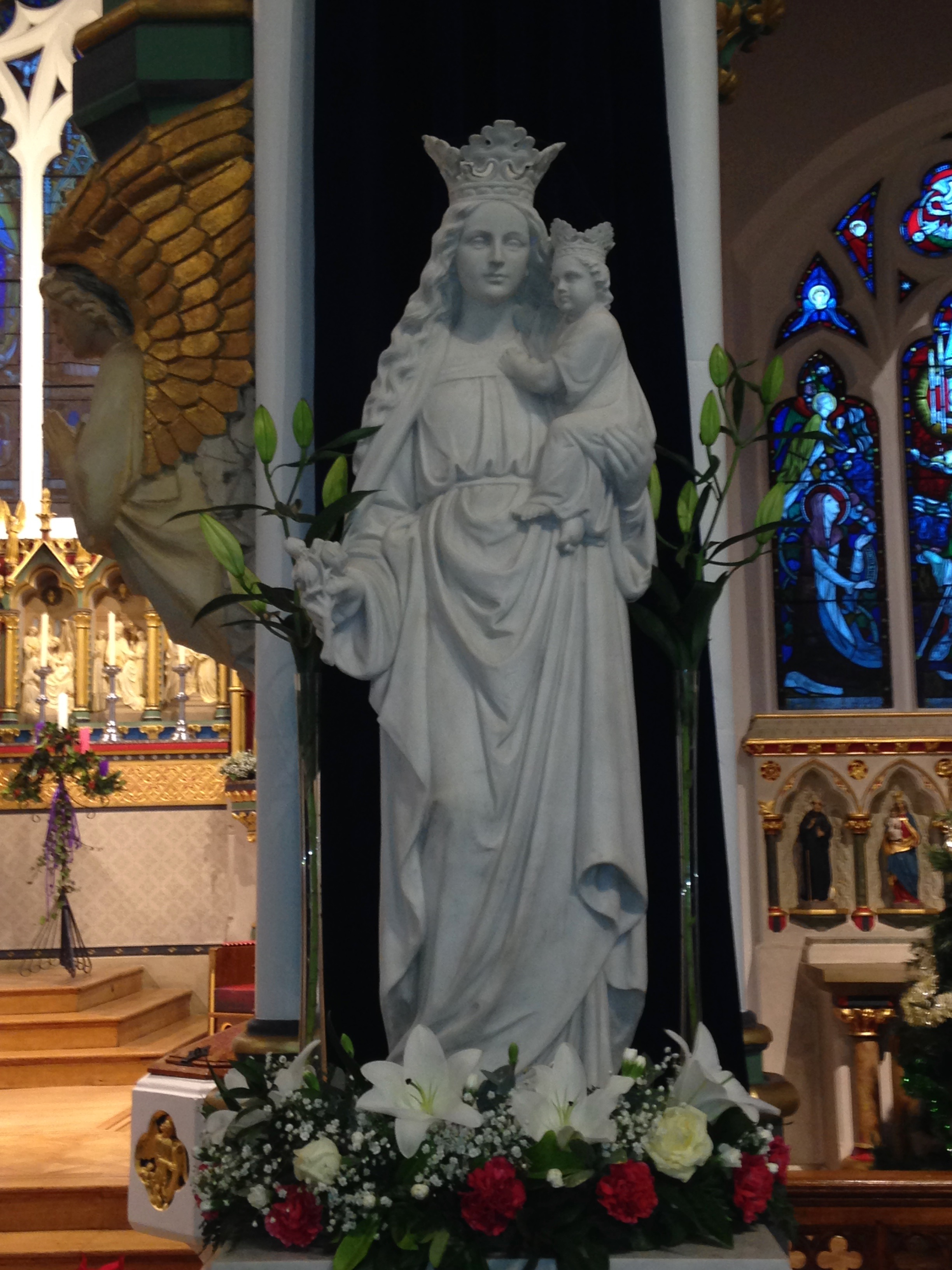
Statue of Mary, Mother of God

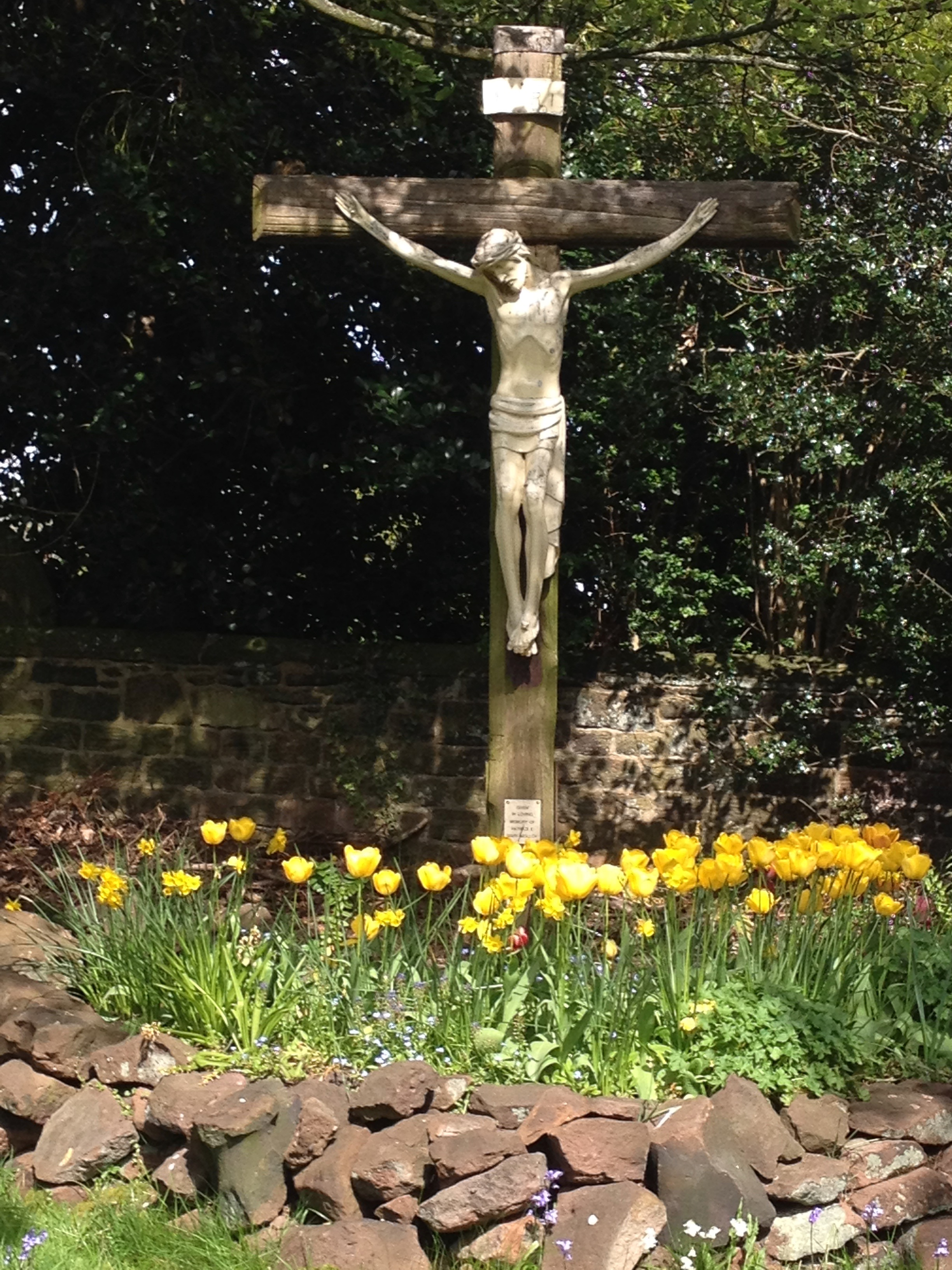
Calvery situated in the church grounds, some stones from the old priory can be found at its base.

St Mary's Church is located on Church Road, Woolton, Liverpool, Merseyside, England. It is an active Roman Catholic parish church in the Inland Family of Parishes of the Liverpool South Deanery situated in the Archdiocese of Liverpool. The church is recorded in the National Heritage List for England as a designated Grade II listed building.

== History ==
The church was built in 1859–60, and designed by R. W. Hughes, an architect from Preston. It was opened on Sunday, 28 October 1860. The church was re-decorated in 1981–82, and the font was moved to the front of the church. The church's foundation stone was laid on September 11, 1859. The Church was known as Saint Benet's until 1881, when it became known as Saint Mary's.

=== The Catholic Mission in Woolton ===
A Catholic community has been present for over 300 years. Notable dates in the community's history include:

Year	Event
1715	Benedictine Chaplains to the Molyneux family at Woolton Hall.
1731	The ‘Woolton Mission’ was founded at St. Benet's Priory in Watergate Lane. The Parish school – Much Woolton Catholic Primary now stands on this site.
1795	The exiled Benedictine nuns of Cambrai, the future Stanbrook Abbey, moved into 43-47 Woolton Street and ran a girls' school until they moved away in 1808.
1859	The Foundation Stone of the present Church was laid by parish priest Placid Burchall and dedicated to the patronage of Saint Benet.
1860	The Church was opened on 28 October.
1861	The Church was renamed Saint Mary's.
1869	The School building (now the Parish Centre) and the Presbytery were built.
1873	The Cloisters were built, to join the Church and Presbytery.
1928	The Benedictines departed St Mary's. The Mill Hill Fathers became rectors.
1931	V. Rev. Dr. Charles Gelderd becomes the first secular Parish Priest of Saint Mary's.
1947	V. Rev Cannon Edward Murphy is appointed Parish Priest and remains for the next 33 years.
1950	Bishop Halsall celebrated the Mass of consecration in the Church on 8 September.
1980	V. Rev. Mgr. John P. Mahony is appointed as Parish Priest
1981/2	During the early 1980s the Church interior was extensively redecorated, and the font was moved to its current position at the front of the church.
1982	Saint Benet's Priory in Watergate Lane is demolished.
1984	Saint Benet's Cemetery is closed to make way for the housing development ‘Priory Way’. Remains, tombstones, monuments and other memorials were transferred to the graveyard at Saint Mary's.
1987	An ecumenical covenant is signed with the other churches in Woolton: St James’, St Peter's and the United Reformed Church pledging a cooperative witness of Christ's people.
1989	V. Rev. Mgr. Peter W. Ryan appointed as Parish Priest.
1999	Rev. Fr. Patrick O’Brien appointed as Parish Priest.
2011	Following Fr. Patrick's retirement Rev. Fr. Timothy J Buckley C.Ss.R. appointed Parish Priest. The Redemptorist Community at Bishop Eton take Pastoral Responsibility for the Parish
2025	The Pastoral Care of the Parish returned to the Archdiocese in September. Fr Peter McGrail was appointed Parish Priest of St Mary's and St John Vianney (Halewood).

=== Priests who have served at Saint Mary's ===
- 1855–1861: R.P. Burchall OSB
- 1862–1873: J.P. O’Brien OSB
- 1873–1880: P. Whittle OSB
- 1880–1891: W. Bede Prest OSB
- 1891–1894: H.G. Murphies OSB
- 1895–1896: J.W. Richards OSB
- 1896–1897: C.J. Fitzgerald OSB
- 1897–1909: Ambrose A. Pereria OSB
- 1909: A.F. Fleming OSB
- 1909–1913: Vincent Corney OSB
- 1913–1919: H.M. Campbell OSB
- 1919–1928: J.M. Kelly OSB
- 1928: E.D. Fennell OSB

Assistant priests during the above years

- B.M. Sutter OSB, A.J. McEvoy OSB, T.L. Almond OSB, Vincent Corney OSB, H.W. McKay OSB, P. O’Callaghan OSB, J.R. Riley OSB, J.G. Dolan OSB, C de Neubourg OSB, J.R. Rylance OSB, L.S. Cave OSB, E.D. Fennell OSB, R.V. Gilbertson OSB, J.M. Kelly OSB, F.A. Harrington OSB, T.P. Worsley-Warwick OSB

In 1928, the Benedictines then departed after two centuries of service; Mill Hill Fathers became Rectors

- 1928–1930: Fr. Herman Drontman
- 1930–1931: Fr. Martin Onsten
- Assistant: Fr. William Ross

The first secular priest Fr. Charles Gelderd was appointed by Archbishop Richard Downey in 1931.

Years	Parish Priests	Years	Assistant Priests (Residents) and Permanent Deacons
1931 – 1947	V.Rev. Dr. Charles Gelderd	1932 – 35	Fr Brendan Chapman
1931 – 1947	V.Rev. Dr. Charles Gelderd	1935 – 40	Fr Francis Clayton
1931 – 1947	V.Rev. Dr. Charles Gelderd	1939	Fr John P. Mahony
1931 – 1947	V.Rev. Dr. Charles Gelderd	1940 – 43	Fr Edward Crowley Fr Patrick Neligan
1931 – 1947	V.Rev. Dr. Charles Gelderd	1943 – 48	Fr Stanley Baker
1931 – 1947	V.Rev. Dr. Charles Gelderd	1943	Fr Finian O’Connor
1931 – 1947	V.Rev. Dr. Charles Gelderd	1945	Fr Cyril Pilson
1947 – 1980	V. Rev. Canon Edward Murphy	1946 – 52	Frs George Hickson & Francis Ripley
1947 – 1980	V. Rev. Canon Edward Murphy	1950 – 58	Fr Patrick Higgins
1947 – 1980	V. Rev. Canon Edward Murphy	1952	Fr Vincent Gaskell
1947 – 1980	V. Rev. Canon Edward Murphy	1957 – 59	Fr Patrick Rose
1947 – 1980	V. Rev. Canon Edward Murphy	1958 – 61	Fr Michael Gaine
1947 – 1980	V. Rev. Canon Edward Murphy	1960 – 66	Fr James Collins
1947 – 1980	V. Rev. Canon Edward Murphy	1961 – 63	Fr Peter Doyle
1947 – 1980	V. Rev. Canon Edward Murphy	1962 – 64	Fr Gerald Willacy
1947 – 1980	V. Rev. Canon Edward Murphy	1963 – 65	Fr Louis Hanlon
1947 – 1980	V. Rev. Canon Edward Murphy	1964 – 69	Fr Joseph Howard
1947 – 1980	V. Rev. Canon Edward Murphy	1966 – 70	Fr Bernard Bimson
1947 – 1980	V. Rev. Canon Edward Murphy	1969 – 71	Fr Cyril Thomas
1947 – 1980	V. Rev. Canon Edward Murphy	1970 – 73	Fr Kevin Ashton
1947 – 1980	V. Rev. Canon Edward Murphy	1971 – 73	Fr Francis Goulbourne
1947 – 1980	V. Rev. Canon Edward Murphy	1974 – 75	Fr Bernard Bimson
1947 – 1980	V. Rev. Canon Edward Murphy	1974 – 79	Fr Christopher Crowley
1947 – 1980	V. Rev. Canon Edward Murphy	1977 – 84	Fr James Lahiff
1947 – 1980	V. Rev. Canon Edward Murphy	1979 – 85	Fr Brian Crane
1980 – 1989	V. Rev. Mgr. John P. Mahony	1985 – 88	Fr Robert Starkey
1980 – 1989	V. Rev. Mgr. John P. Mahony	1988 –96	Fr Thomas Wood
1989 – 1999	V. Rev. Mgr. Peter W. Ryan	1997 - 2011	Deacon Adrian Dickinson
1999 - 2011	Fr. Patrick O’Brien	1997 - 2011	Deacon Adrian Dickinson

As Fr. Pat O’Brien's retirement approached, the Congregation of the Most Holy Redeemer, better known as the Redemptorists, were asked by Archbishop Patrick Kelly to take over the Pastoral Care of St. Mary's. This would be in addition to their parish of Our Lady of the Annunciation of Bishop Eton. The Parishes would not be merged but would continue to exist in their own right.

Years	Parish Priest	Assistant Priest	Permanent Deacon
2011 - 2025	Fr Timothy J. Buckley CSsR	Fr Barry O'Toole CSsR Fr Charles Randall CSsR	Rev Bernard Rigby

In 2025, St Mary's became part of South Liverpool's Inland Family of Parishes along with Our Lady of the Annunciation of Bishop Eton, Our Lady of the Assumption, Christ the King & Our Lady and St John Vianney parishes.

It was announced in May 2025 that beginning in autumn 2025, pastoral responsibility for St Mary's will return to the Archdiocese. Fr Peter McGrail, who teaches theology at Liverpool Hope University, will be appointed Parish Priest for both St Mary's and St John Vianney Parishes; Fr Peter Murphy will be appointed as Assistant Priest for a period of two years.

Year	Parish Priest	Assistant Priest	Permanent Deacon
Sept 2025	Fr. Peter McGrail	Fr. Peter Murphy	

== Architecture ==
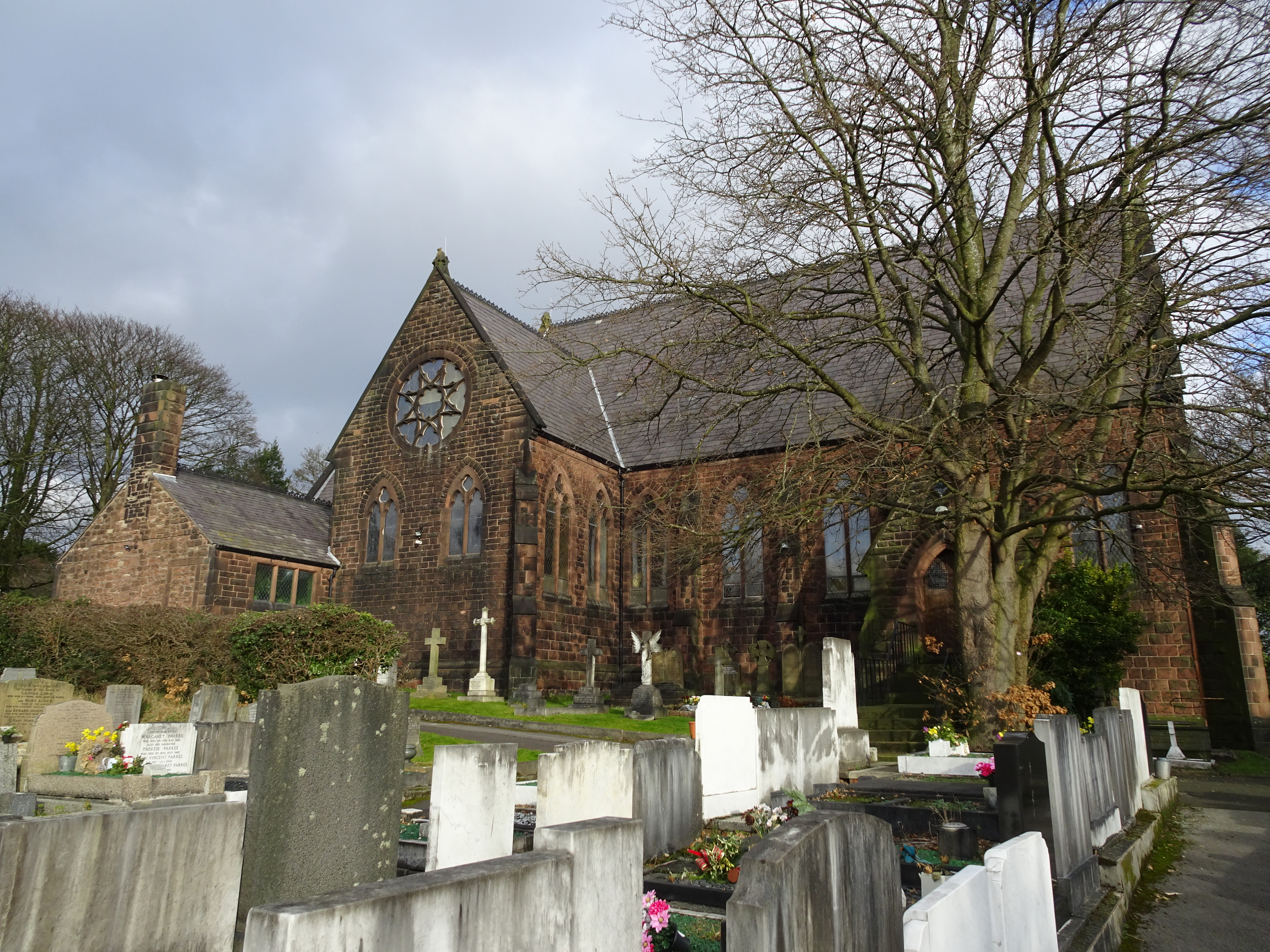
St. Mary's viewed from the rear.

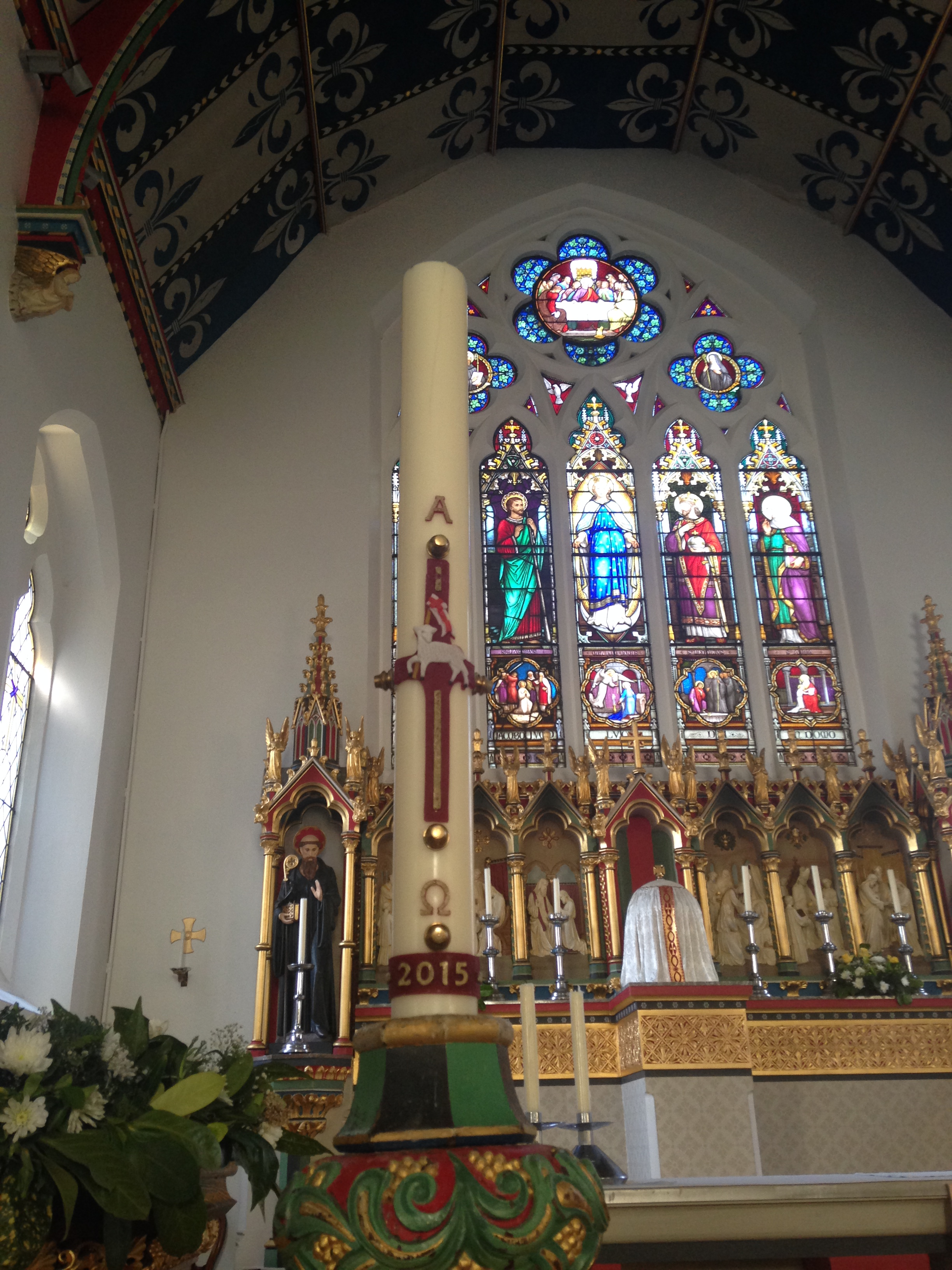
Paschal Candle (2015) and view of the stained glass behind the main altar.

=== Exterior ===
St Mary's is constructed in red sandstone and has a slate roof. It is orientated with the ritual east facing the northwest. (Note: In the description of the church, the ritual orientation is used.) The plan consists of a five-bay nave with a north porch but without aisles, large north and south transepts, a chancel with north and south chapels and sacristies. There is no tower, and at the west end are diagonal buttresses, an entrance, and pointed windows containing Geometric tracery. The windows along the sides of the nave have two lights. In the south transept is a four-light window, and the north transept contains two two-light windows with a rose window above. In the chapel is a five-light window flanked by diagonal buttresses. The chapels are gabled with two-light windows. The south sacristy has one and two lights, with a rose window in the gable.

=== Interior ===
Inside the church, the high altar and reredos date from 1865, and were probably designed by E. W. Pugin. They were separated in 1948–50 by Weightman and Bullen, who placed the reredos against the east wall. The stained glass in the east window dates from 1878, and is a typical design by the Belgian stained glass painter Jean-Baptiste Capronnier. The two-manual pipe organ was built by Franklin Lloyd in 1895, and is situated in a gallery on the north wall of the church at the west end.

=== Stained glass windows ===
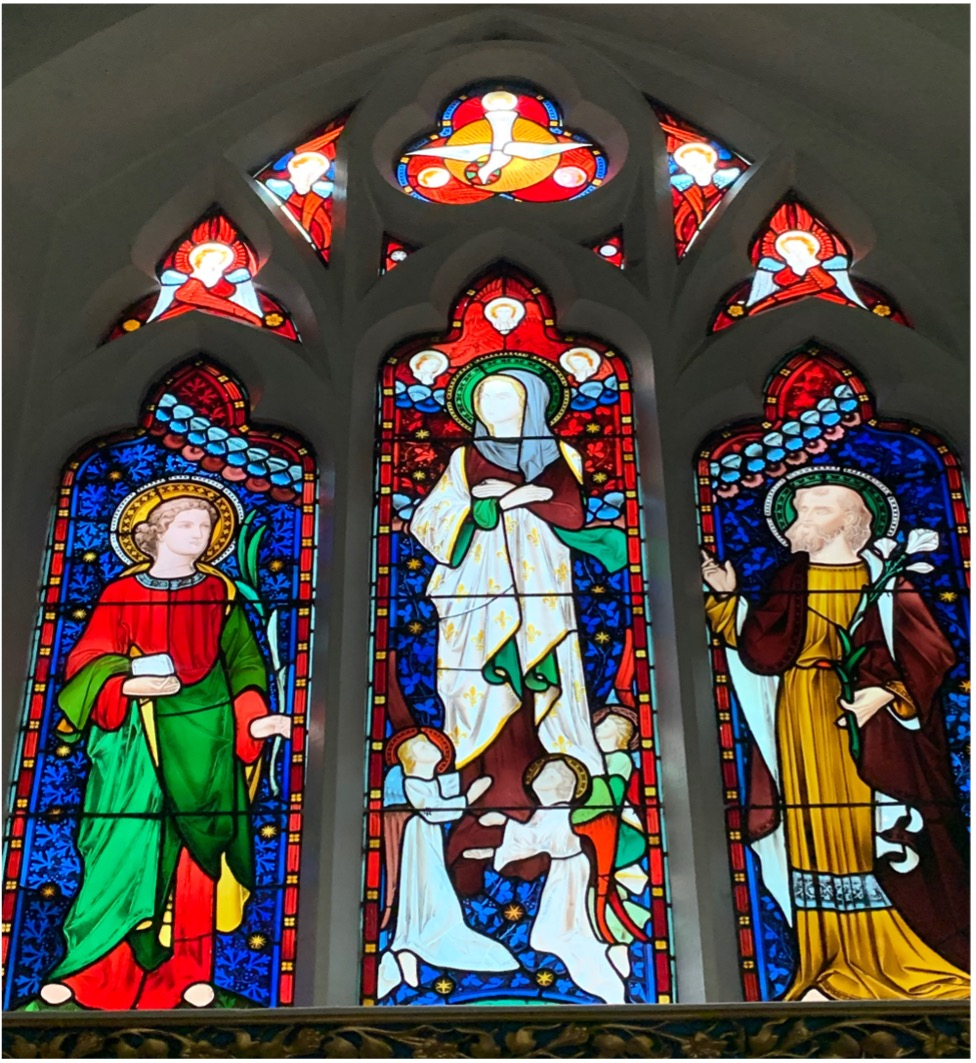
Window above Lady Altar

The main window was donated by the Jump family. At the apex is a representation of the Last Supper. St Benedict and Scholastica are pictured below and included because of the Parish being founded by Benedictines.

The saints below are (left to right) St Baldwin (a Benedictine reformer), St James, St Mary, St Henry and St Anne. These last four saints are name saints of members of the Jump family buried outside near to the church porch. The inscription reads "Donante Jacob Jump luceo deo in domo" which translates as "Donated by James Jump to bring light to God’s house".

Above the word Donante can be seen the maker's inscription: J. P. Capronnier, Brussels. Jean-Baptiste Capronnier (1814–1891) was a Belgian stained glass painter. Born in Brussels in 1814, he was an influential figure in the modern revival of glass-painting, and first made his reputation by his study of the old methods of workmanship. He created windows for various churches in Brussels, Bruges, and Amsterdam, and his work was commissioned also for France, Italy and England. At the Paris Exhibition of 1855 he won the only medal given for glass painting. He died in Brussels in 1891.

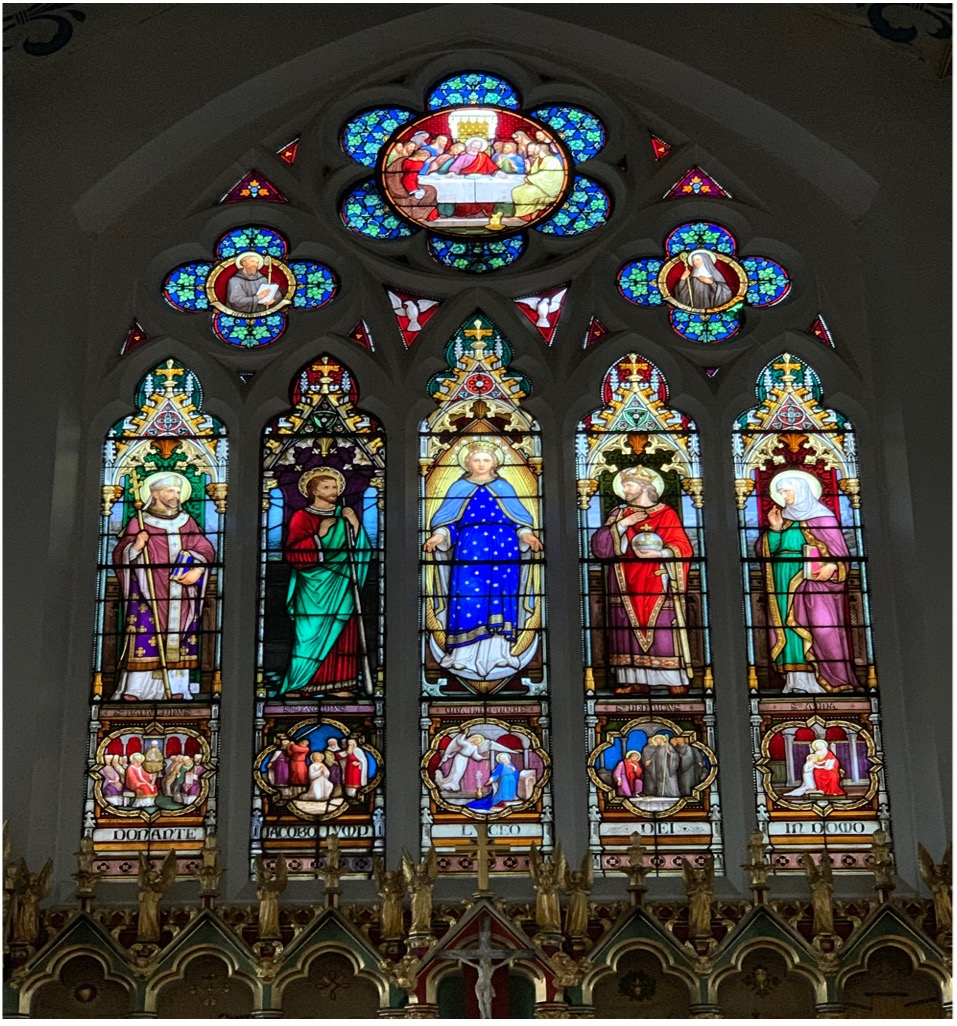
Main Window St Mary's

The window which can be found above the Lady Altar depicts St John the evangelist, St Mary and St Joseph. An inscription read "Pray for the soul of Joanna Simpson who died September 8, 1859". A Miss Simpson gave a gift £1000 towards the building of this Church.

The window above our Sacred Heart Altar has images of St Elizabeth, St Anne and St Robert. All three saints are saint names of members of the Roskell family.

The window in the South Transept was erected to the memory of Francis and Clare Reynolds, buried outside by the church entrance, who lived in what is now Reynolds Park. The window depicts St Francis and St Clare. Francis and Clare Reynolds were members of the third order of St Francis. The other two saints, Elizabeth of Hungary and St Vincent de Paul, are patrons of the third order. In the small panes below each saint are scenes from their life.

Central to the rose window, found in the North Transept, is Our Lady of Perpetual Succour. This icon was brought to Liverpool in 1866 by the Redemptorists.

== Associated buildings ==
=== Presbytery ===
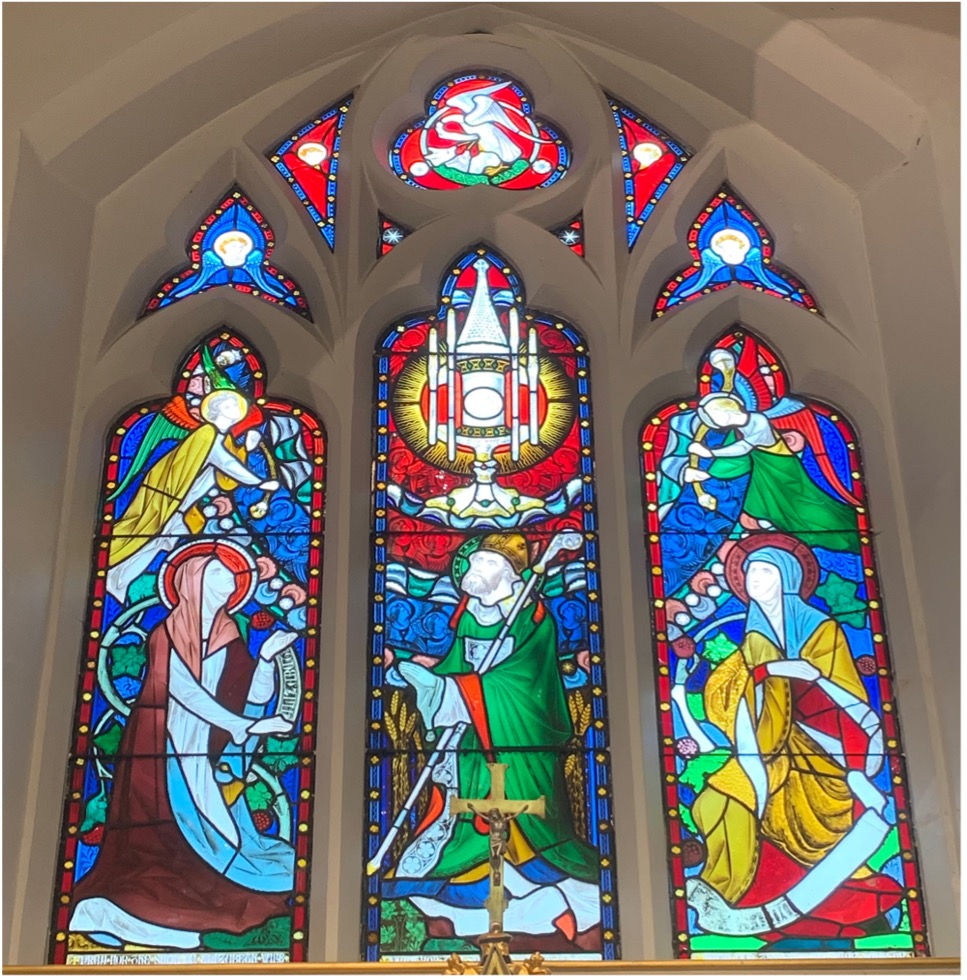

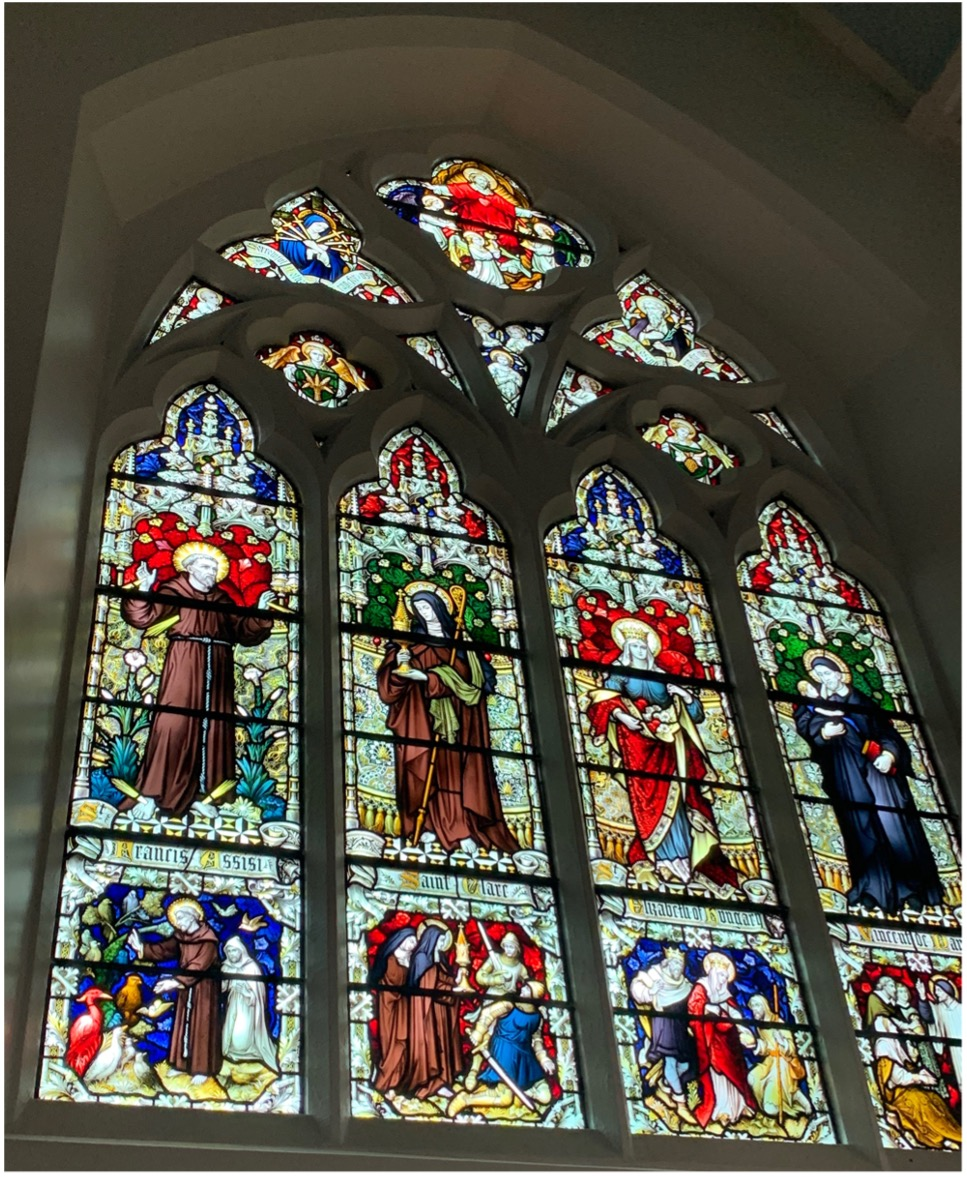

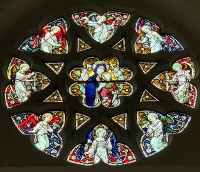

The presbytery was built in 1864, and was designed by E. W. Pugin. It is constructed in stone, and has a slate roof. The presbytery has two storeys and a front of three bays, the outer bays projecting under gables. In the centre bay is a gablet, and the third bay contains a single-storey canted bay window. The presbytery is connected on the left by a single-storey corridor with a central gabled entrance and a ridge dormer. It is designated as a Grade II listed building.

=== Parish Centre (Formerly Much Woolton Catholic Primary School) ===
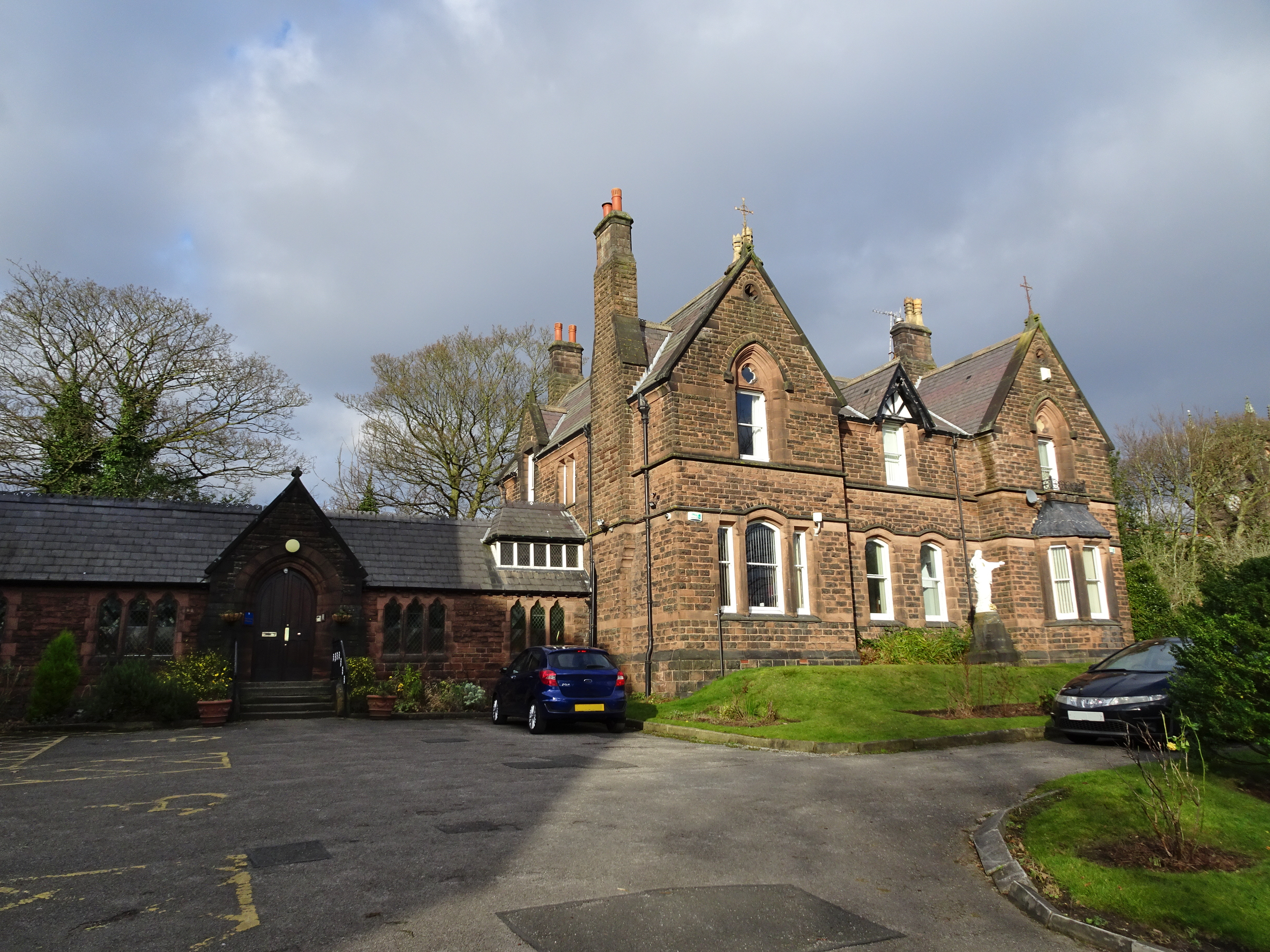
The Presbytery.

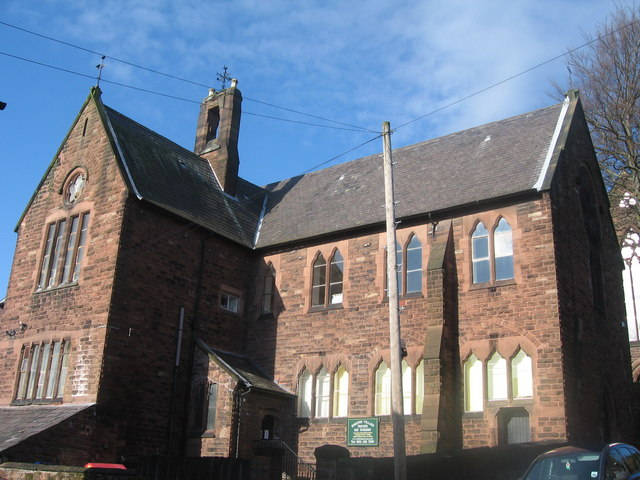
St Mary's School.

The school was built in 1869, with its entrance in Mount Street. It is constructed in red sandstone with a slate roof. The school is in two storeys and has a nine-bay front, the central bay projecting forward under a gable. The windows in the ground floor have three lights under ogee heads; those in the upper floor have two lights under cusped heads. In the gable of the projecting wing is a rose window. The school is also listed at Grade II. The school building is now used as the Parish Hall and the ground floor is a Nursery.

== Commonwealth War Graves ==
The following war dead are buried in Saint Mary's Cemetery:

- Captain J F Crean (died 17 October 1918 at 41 years old).
- Private Alfred Tankersley Lowe (died 24 June 1919 at 23 years old).
- Trooper Frederick Quick (died 1 August 1943).

== See also ==
- Grade II listed buildings in Liverpool-L25

== References and notes ==
Notes

Citations
