= Tabernacle Chapel, Cardiff =

Church in Cardiff, Wales

Coordinates: 51.4785°N 3.1762°W

Tabernacle
- Tabernacle Welsh Baptist Church
- Y Tabernacl
- Tabernacl Eglwys Bedyddwyr Cymraeg
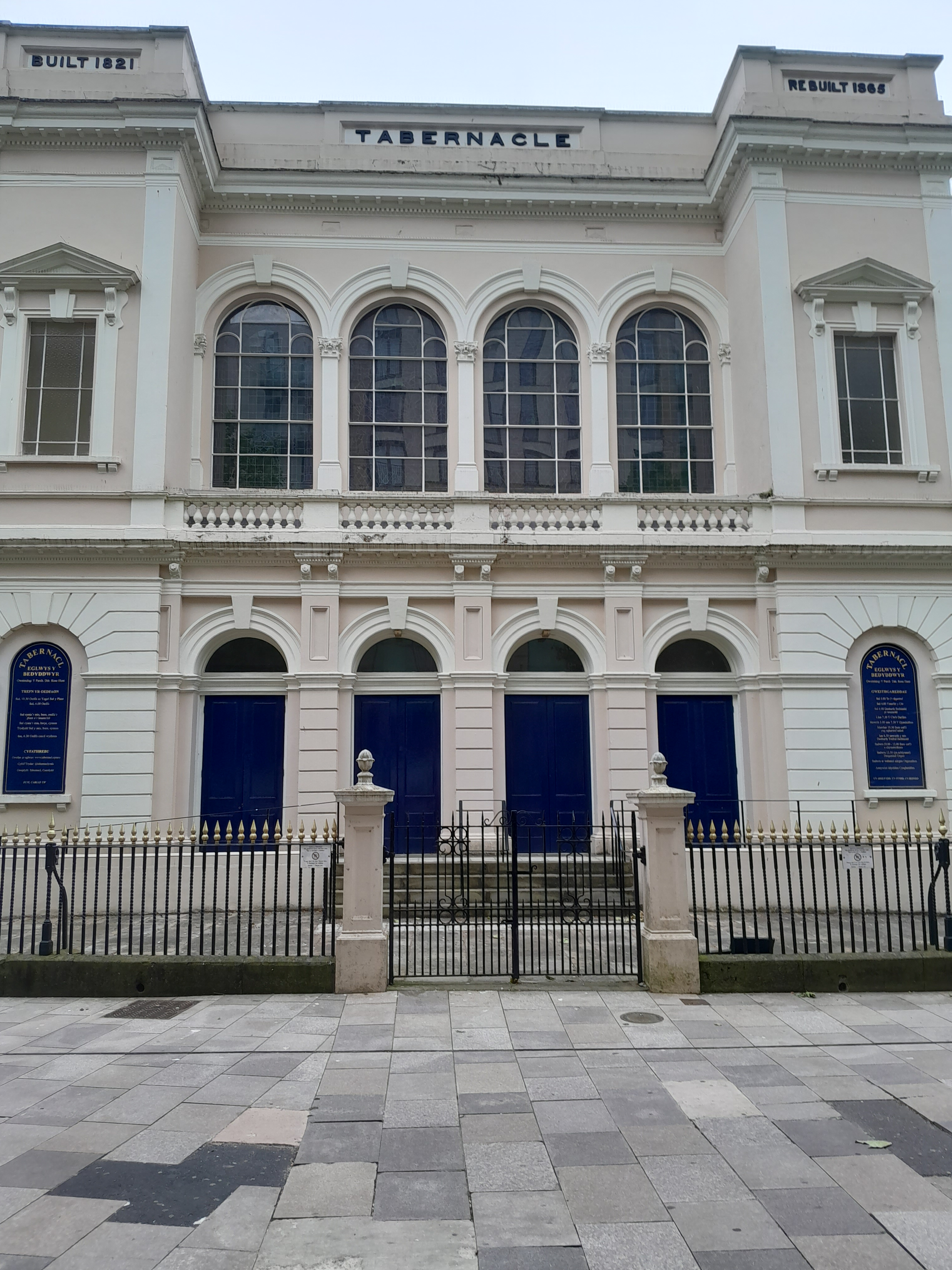
- Y Tabernacl
- Tabernacle
- Country: Wales
- Denomination: Baptist
- Website: tabernacl.cymru

Architecture
- Heritage designation: Grade II* listed
- Completed: 1865
- Construction cost: £3000 (1865)

Specifications
- Capacity: 950

Tabernacle (Welsh: Y Tabernacl) is a Welsh-language Baptist chapel in The Hayes in the centre of Cardiff, Wales. It is a Grade II* listed building.

== History and description ==
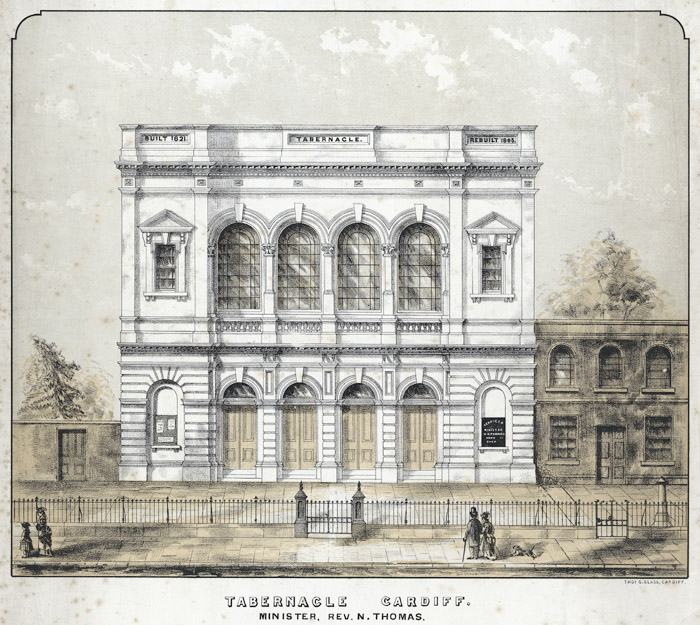
The chapel in about 1870

A chapel existed on the site from 1821, enlarged in 1840, then further enlarged and rebuilt between 1862 and 1865 in an Italianate style under local architect J. Hartland and Son. The front of the building has evidence of redevelopment rather than a complete rebuild, with one of the stair towers projecting beyond the main facade and the four upper windows appearing off-centre when viewed from inside.

The front of the building is set back from the main road behind a forecourt, fronted with wrought iron railings and two gate pillars. The chapel façade is two generous storeys including a stair tower at each corner. The upper level of the central façade is set back, with four prominent round-headed windows. At ground floor level there are four round-headed doorways in a similar style, with one of them behind the main entrance. The stair towers and façade are topped by a parapet, which includes the inscriptions BUILT 1821, TABERNACLE and REBUILT 1865. The façades have a painted stucco finish.

The main interior space is surrounded on all four sides by a high level gallery with a wrought iron balustrade, all supported on iron columns. The main ceiling is flat coffered with a large ceiling rose. A large arch at the back of the space encloses the organ and a wooden pulpit. Viewed from inside, the stained glass windows can be appreciated. The central pair of upper level round-headed windows portray colourful scenes from the Bible, with one being the baptism of Jesus by John the Baptist in the River Jordan. The windows were installed in 1928 in memory of the previous minister, Charles Davies (d. 1927), though it is unusual to have images like these in a nonconformist church.

The chapel has been a listed building since 1975, currently Grade II*, as an "ambitious chapel ...with particularly fine interior".

== Songs of Praise ==
On 1 October 1961 the Tabernacle Chapel was the location of the first broadcast of the BBC's long-running religious TV programme, Songs of Praise. The programme returned there again in June 2011 to film for the 50th anniversary edition.
