= William John Hurst =

New Zealand politician

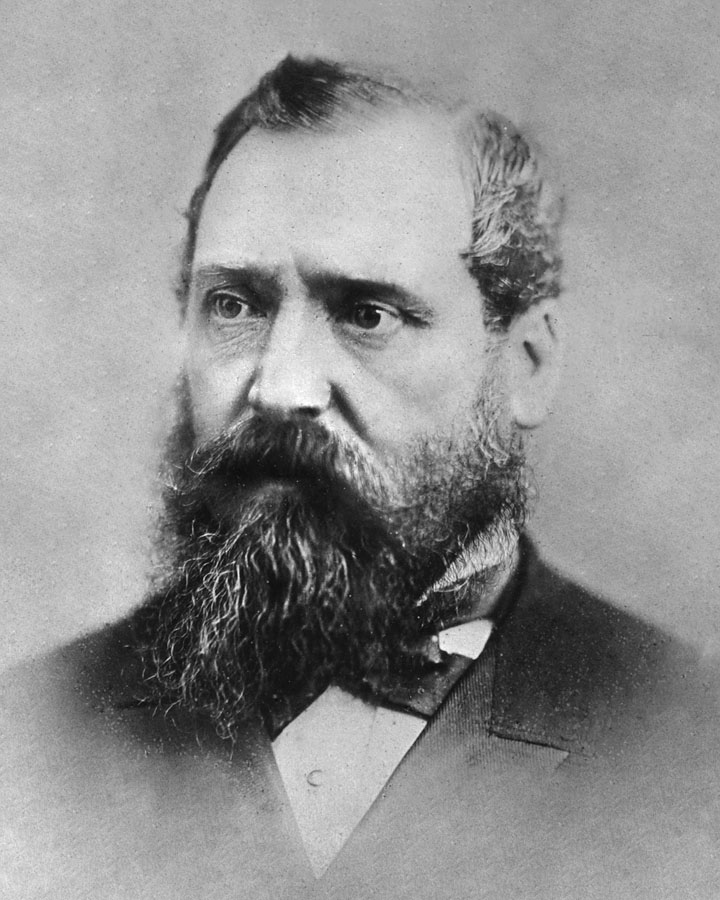

5th Mayor of Auckland City
- In office 1876–1877
- Preceded by: Benjamin Tonks
- Succeeded by: Henry Brett

Personal details
- Born: 1829 Berwick upon Tweed
- Died: 1886 (aged 56–57) Folkestone England
- Spouse: Mary E Hurst
- Occupation: Politician

William John Hurst (c. 1829 – 29 September 1886) was a 19th-century Member of Parliament in New Zealand and Mayor of Auckland.

He was born in Berwick-upon-Tweed, England.

In January 1868, Hurst stood in a by-election in the City of Auckland East electorate for the Auckland Provincial Council. He defeated Charles Davis 163 votes to 107. Hurst remained on the provincial council until the abolition of provincial government in 1876.

Hurst represented the Auckland West electorate from the 1879 election to 1881, and then the Waitemata electorate from the 1881 election to 1886 when he died.

His homestead, built in 1860, is located in 288 Hurstmere Road in Takapuna.

Hurst was ill and given leave from Parliament to travel home to England via San Francisco. He died in Folkestone, Kent, England, in 1886, aged 57 years.

He was married to Mary E. Hurst.

New Zealand Parliament
Years	Term	Electorate	Party
1879–1881	7th	Auckland West	Independent
1881–1884	8th	Waitemata	Independent
1884–1886	9th	Waitemata	Independent

Political offices
Preceded by Benjamin Tonks	Mayor of Auckland City; 1876–1877	Succeeded by Henry Brett
New Zealand Parliament
Preceded by Reader Wood	Member of Parliament for Waitemata; 1881–1886	Succeeded by Richard Monk
