= Poet Laureate of Arkansas =

The poet laureate of Arkansas is the poet laureate for the U.S. state of Arkansas. Charles T. Davis was the first until his death on December 21, 1945. The poet laureate of Arkansas is Suzanne Underwood Rhodes, who was appointed to a four-year term in 2022.

== List of poets laureate ==
- Charles T. Davis (1923-1945)
- Rosa Zagnoni Marinoni (1953-1970)
- Ercil Brown (interim appointee, 1970-1971)
- Lily Peter (1971-1991)
- Verna Lee Hinegardner (1991-2003)
- Peggy Vining (2003-2017)
- Jo Garret McDougall (2018-2022)
- Suzanne Underwood Rhodes (2022-present)

== See also ==
- Poet laureate
- List of U.S. state poets laureate
- United States Poet Laureate
