= Chuck Davis =

Chuck Davis may refer to:

- Charles Davis (basketball, born 1984), naturalized Azerbaijani basketball player
- Chuck Davis (businessman) (born 1960), Internet entrepreneur
- Chuck Davis (dancer) (1937–2017), African-American dancer, choreographer, and founder of several dance groups

== See also ==
- Charles Davis (disambiguation)
