= Charles Crawford Davis =

American audio engineer

- Born: November 27, 1893; Fenton, Michigan, U.S.
- Died: December 16, 1966 (aged 73); Ojai, California
- Education: University of Michigan
- Occupations: Inventor, audio engineer
- Known for: Davis Drive System, Stereophonic disc recording
- Awards: Academy Award (1948), Samuel Warner Memorial Award (1956), Emile Berliner Award (1958)

Charles Crawford Davis (November 27, 1893 – December 16, 1966) was an American audio engineer known for his innovations in the motion picture industry.

== Career ==
Davis was born and raised in Fenton, Michigan, the son of Caroline (née Crawford) and James Franklin Davis. He graduated from Fenton High School and studied engineering at the University of Michigan. In World War One he served as a member of the American Expeditionary Forces. After the war he moved to California and worked in the film industry. He devised techniques for integration of sound and film in recording cameras and projectors. At the time, his techniques were widely used in the industry. He was awarded several patents for his innovations. In 1948 he received an Academy Award for his technical contributions to the film industry. In 1956 he received the Samuel Warner Memorial Award from the Society of Motion Picture and Television Engineers. In 1958 he received the Emile Berliner Award from the Audio Engineering Society. Davis died in 1966 at the age of 73.
