= Henry Brett (journalist) =

New Zealand journalist and politician (1843–1927)

Sir Henry Brett
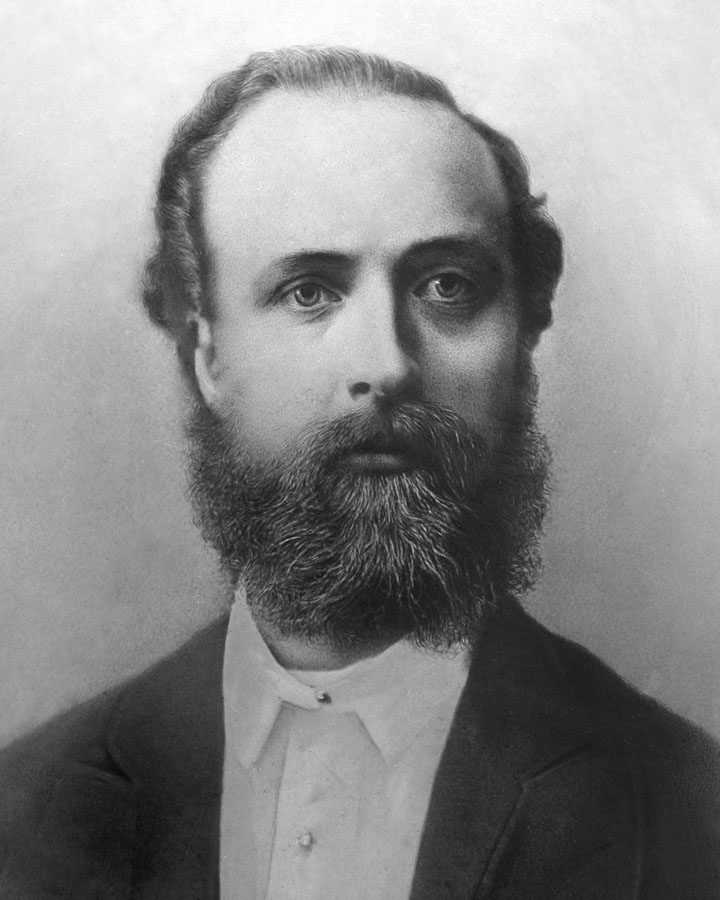

6th Mayor of Auckland City
- In office 19 December 1877 – 27 November 1878
- Preceded by: William Hurst
- Succeeded by: Thomas Peacock

Personal details
- Born: 25 February 1843 St Mary Magdalen, Sussex, England
- Died: 29 January 1927 (aged 83) Rotorua, New Zealand
- Spouse: Mary Moon
- Children: 6
- Occupation: Journalist

Sir Henry Brett (25 February 1843 – 29 January 1927) was a New Zealand journalist, newspaper proprietor, publisher, writer and politician who issued many standard works on colonial subjects.

== Biography ==
Brett was born in St Mary Magdalen, Sussex, England, on 25 February 1843. He was brought up to the printing trade in the office of his uncle, the proprietor of the Hastings and St. Leonards Gazette.

Brett left for New Zealand with the non-conformist special settlers in 1862, intending to settle upon the land, but on arrival at Auckland the vessel was boarded by a representative of the Daily Southern Cross in search of compositors, and Brett was persuaded to accept an engagement on that paper. Shortly afterwards he joined the reporting staff of The New Zealand Herald and maintained his connection with that journal till 1870, when for the sum of £90 he acquired a third interest in the Auckland Evening Star, which had been recently started by G. M. Reid, and was then in a struggling condition. By the infusion of additional energy, and the employment of carrier pigeons to supply the want of telegraphs in those days—this being one of the most successful innovations in journalism introduced by Brett—the Auckland Star forged ahead and extinguished its evening rival.

In February 1876, Reid disposed of his interest to Brett—the share of the third partner having previously been acquired by the firm—and the latter thus became sole proprietor. He later disposed of a partnership interest to Thomson Leys, who succeeded Reid in the editorship of the paper, which reportedly had the largest circulation in New Zealand. The second publishing venture of the firm was the Auckland Almanack and Provincial Handbook, started in 1872; and they also established the New Zealand Farmer and Bee and Poultry Journal, a monthly agricultural magazine, and the New Zealand Graphic.

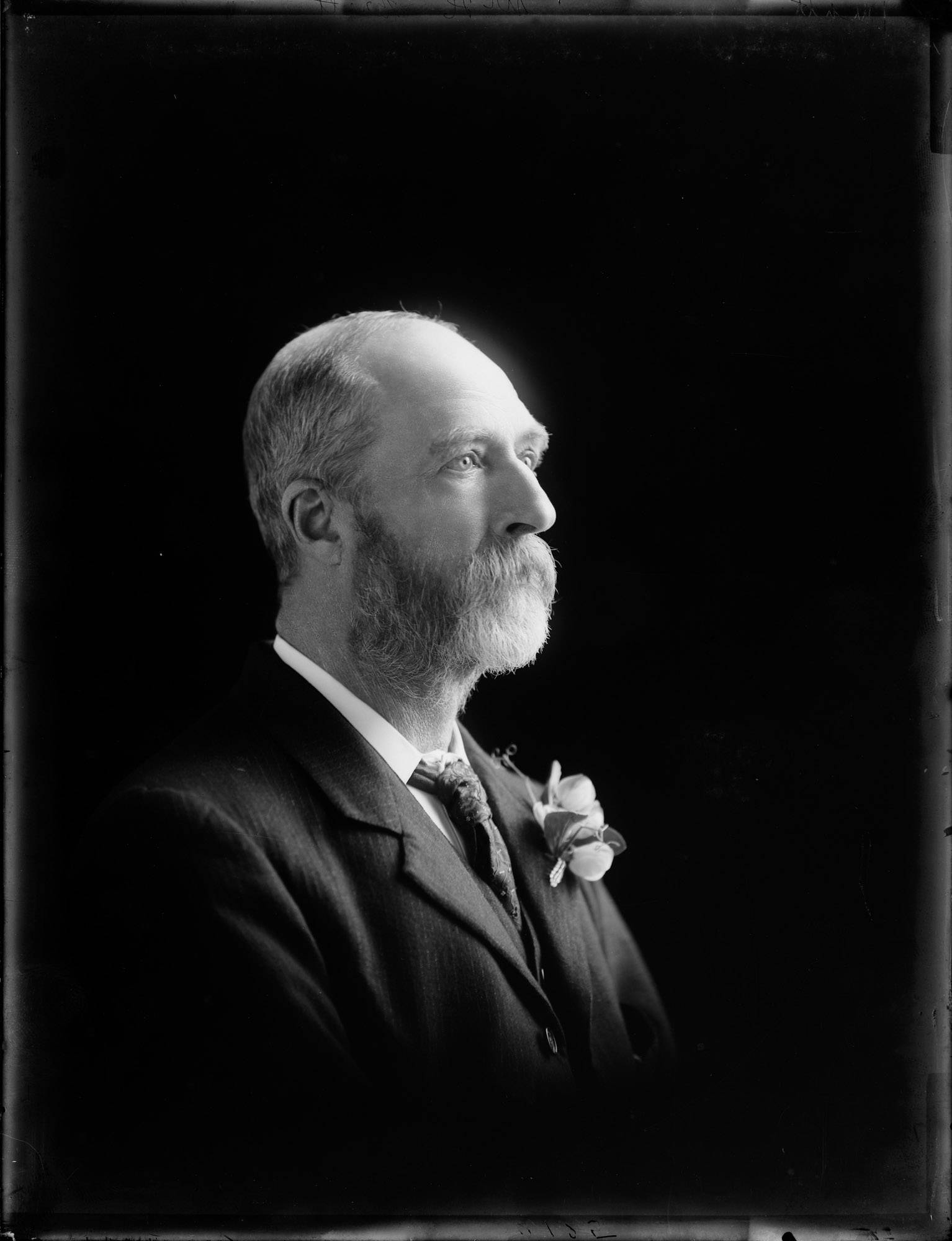
Brett in later life, c. 1910–1919

Brett was a director of the New Zealand Press Association and president of the Auckland Choral Society, and occupied a seat on the Auckland City Council from 1874 to 1878. In 1878, without a contest, he was chosen mayor. His only opponent, Frederick Larkins, withdrew after being nominated.

In the 1926 New Year Honours, Brett was appointed a Knight Bachelor, in recognition of his public services. He died in Rotorua the following year while there on holiday.

Political offices
Preceded by William John Hurst	Mayor of Auckland City; 1877–1878	Succeeded by Thomas Peacock
