= Charles Davies (Baptist minister) =

Welsh Baptist minister (1849–1927)

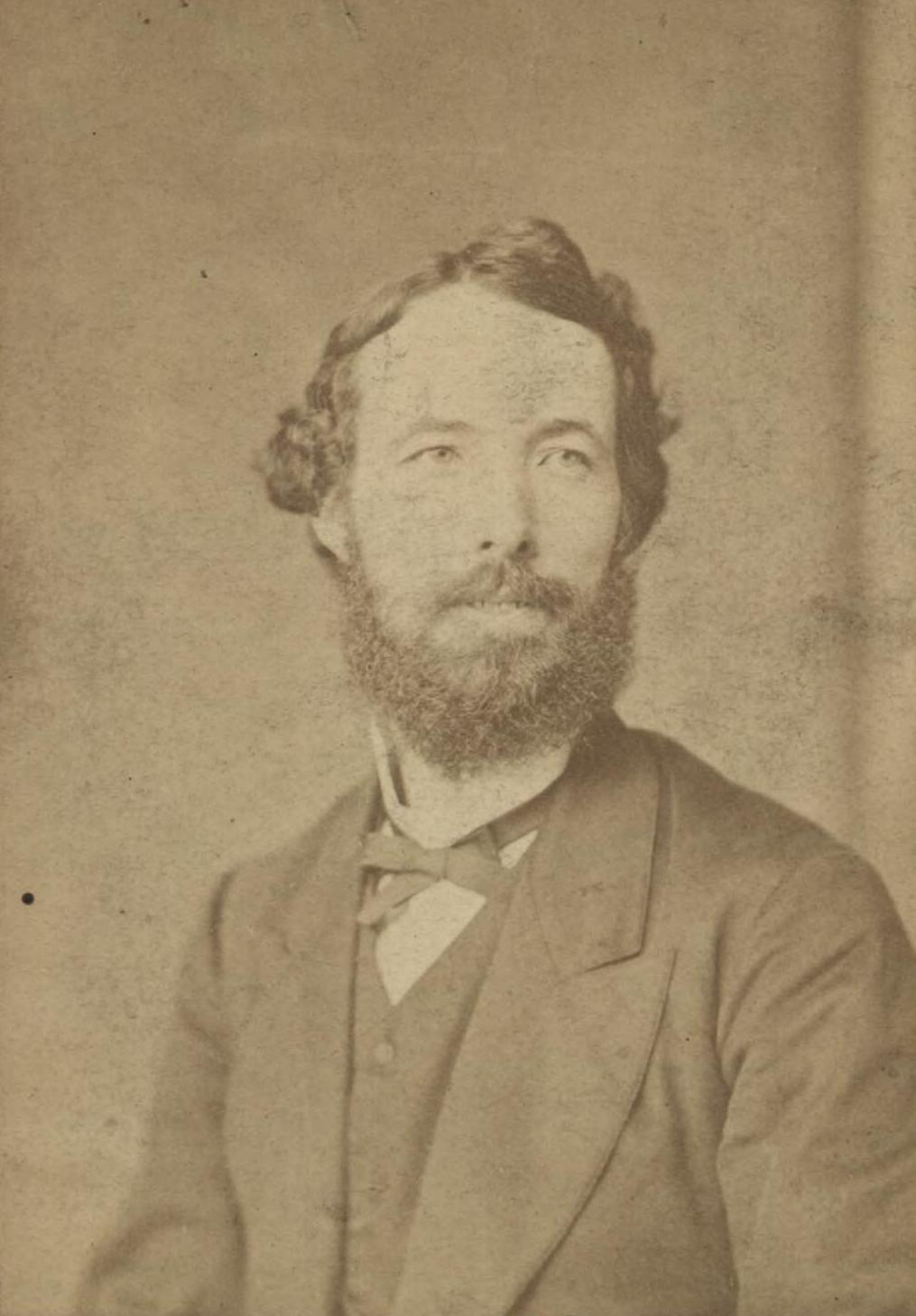
Portrait of Charles Davies

Charles Davies (1849 – January 1927) was a Welsh Baptist minister. His parents were Daniel and Margaret Davies of Llwynhendy. After completing his education at the Graig Academy grammar school in Swansea, he moved to study at the Baptist College, Llangollen. Following his ordination in 1870 he took charge of Penuel, Bangor. In 1877 he moved to Everton Village, Liverpool, before returning to Wales in 1888 to follow Nathaniel Thomas (1818–1888) as minister of Tabernacle Chapel, Cardiff.

His published writings include Cyfrol o Bregethau (1910), and contributions to Y Geninen.

He died in January 1927. In the following year, a stained glass window was installed at the chapel in his memory.
