= Charles Henry Davis (bishop) =

English-born Australian Catholic bishop (1815–1854)

The Most Reverend Charles Henry Davis OSB
- Bishop of Diocese of Maitland
- Diocese: Maitland
- Installed: 25 February 1848
- Term ended: 17 May 1854
- Successor: James Murray

Orders
- Ordination: 8 November 1840 at Downside Abbey, Somerset, England by Thomas Joseph Brown OSB
- Consecration: 25 February 1848 at Downside Abbey, Somerset, England by William Bernard Ullathorne OSB

Personal details
- Born: Charles Henry Davis; 18 May 1815 Usk, Monmouth, United Kingdom
- Died: 17 May 1854 (aged 38) Sydney, New South Wales, Australia
- Denomination: Catholic Church
- Occupation: Catholic bishop

Charles Henry Davis (18 May 1815 – 17 May 1854) was an English Benedictine bishop of the Catholic Church. He served as the first Bishop of Maitland and first Coadjutor Archbishop of Sydney.

== Early life ==
Davis was born in Usk, Wales in 1815, to Michael and Jane Davis. He had eight siblings, two of whom died as infants. He was the second youngest of six boys. All six were educated by the monks of Downside Abbey and three of them, including Charles, became Benedictine priests.

Davis concluded his studies at Downside Abbey in 1833 and immediately joined the Benedictine Order. On 1 March 1833, he was clothed in the Benedictine habit by Dom George Turner OSB. The future Archbishop of Sydney, John Bede Polding, was the novice master and subprior at Downside Abbey while Davis was a novice.

He was professed as a Benedictine monk on 24 June 1834, with Polding receiving his vows. He received tonsure and minor orders from Polding in the chapel at Downside on 20 September 1834. He was ordained a subdeacon on 28 May 1836 by Bishop Peter Augustine Baines OSB. He was then ordained a deacon at Prior Park on 23 February 1839.

== Priesthood ==
Davis was ordained as a Benedictine priest on 8 November 1940 in the Downside Abbey chapel by Bishop Thomas Joseph Brown.

Following his ordination, he was given a raft of responsibilities in the Abbey. He was cellarer (1841 to 1847), Prefect of Students (1839 to 1847), infirmarian (1840 to 1847), organist (1834 to 1847) and cantor. In 1844, he was made parish priest of St Benedict's Church, Downside. He displayed considerable talents as an organist, singer and composer.

In 1832, Polding had been appointed Vicar Apostolic of New Holland and Van Diemen's Land, Australia and he arrived in the colony in 1835. He began petitioning for a new diocese to be created in Newcastle to assist in the pastoral care of Catholics in the region.

== Episcopate ==
On 16 April 1847, Polding, then Archbishop of Sydney, wrote to the Prefect of the Congregation, Cardinal Giacomo Filippo Fransoni to petition for the erection of an episcopal see at Maitland. He recommended Placid Burchall, Superior of the Anglo-Benedictine Monastery of Saint Edmond in Douai, France, as a suitable candidate as bishop for the new diocese.

On 9 July 1847, the Holy See announced Burchall would become the first Bishop of Maitland and also be Coadjutor Bishop of Sydney. Burchall refused the appointment on grounds of ill-health, however correspondence from Polding to the Holy See suggested it was instead because the order had refused to lose another priest of such high calibre.

Burchall instead recommended Davis for the position, writing: "[he] has been under the guidance of Monsignor Polding who gives him a very honourable testimonial; and whilst he has praiseworthily held different positions for 13 years in the Convent of St Gregory in England, he has kept longing for the Australian Mission."

Polding agreed with Burchall's recommendation and petitioned for Davis to take up the appointment. The President of the Benedictine Congregation, Dom Luke Bernard Barber, said Davis held too many positions at Downside to be considered for the role. Following prolonged negotiations, it was eventually agreed Davis could take up the appointment.

On 14 September 1847, a decree was issued releasing Burchall from the appointment, and appointing Davis in his place.

Davis was consecrated as a bishop on 25 February 1848 by Bishop William Bernard Ullathorne OSB. Following his ordination, he ordained his younger brother, Edwin Davis, on 18 March 1848. He left for Australia on 15 August 1848. He arrived in Sydney on 8 December 1848.

In Sydney, despite never being in strong health, Davis served with vigour and thoroughness. He helped shore up the administration of the diocese thanks to his attention to detail. He was also seen to be more approachable than Polding. Polding would also often travel to other parts of the state or to Rome, leaving Davis in charge of St Mary's Monastery for long periods of time. He also made regular visits to the Benedictine nuns in Subiaco, near Parramatta.

Despite being appointed to the episcopacy there, Davis never once visited Maitland, with his workload as Polding's coadjutor occupying most of his time.

== Illness and death ==
In 1849, David experienced his first of three life-threatening illnesses. In March 1849, he fainted during the ordination of a deacon and his health deteriorated over the next few weeks, suffering a disease of his liver and bowels. On 2 May 1849, he received the anointing of the sick from Polding while staying at the Benedictine monastery in Subiaco. He recovered sufficiently by 14 August 1849 to make his way back to St Mary's Monastery.

On 12 April 1852, he once again experienced a sharp decline in his health which forced him to rest during holy Week. Doctors considered him to be in a "dangerous state".

In April 1854, he became seriously ill for a third time, just a few weeks after Polding had left the city for Rome.

On 17 May 1854, at 3:00pm, following final absolution, Davis died. He had been due to turn 40 the following day. He became the first Catholic bishop to die in the colony.

He was buried in the mortuary chapel at Subiaco Convent. His remained were transferred to St Mary's Cathedral, Sydney in August 1945.

The Diocese of Maitland remained sede vacante for 11 years following Davis' death, until the appointment of Bishop James Murray in 1865.

Catholic Church titles
Preceded by –	Bishop of Maitland; 1847–1854	Succeeded by James Murray
