= Charles H. S. Davis =

American philologist (1840–1917)

Dr. Charles H. S. Davis
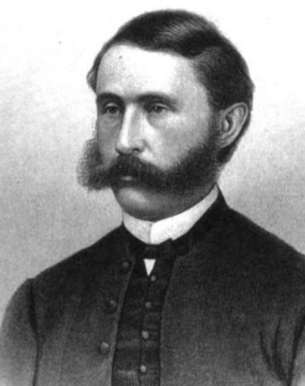
- Born: Charles Henry Stanley Davis; March 2, 1840; Goshen, Connecticut U.S.
- Died: November 7, 1917 (aged 77); Connecticut Valley Hospital, Middletown, Connecticut U.S.
- Education: University of Maryland School of Medicine; New York University (MD); University of Baltimore; Harvard Medical School
- Scientific career
- Fields: Philology and Orientology

Charles Henry Stanley Davis (March 2, 1840 – November 11, 1917) was an American physician, philologist and orientalist who was most notable for his books on medicine and oriental studies. Davis also served two consecutive terms in the Connecticut House of Representatives.

== Biography ==
=== Early life and education ===
Davis was born on March 2, 1840, in Goshen to Timothy Fisher Davis (1810–1870), who was a physician, and Moriva Hatch (1811–1907). Davis grew up in Meriden where he received his early education. After graduating from high school, in 1864, Davis enrolled at the University of Maryland School of Medicine and began his studies in medicine. He graduated as Doctor of Medicine from New York University in 1866 and then took a course at the medical department of the University of Baltimore and another course at Harvard Medical School.

=== Philological studies ===
After his postgraduate studies throughout Europe, Davis began his studies of Hebrew and Syriac including later in the following years; Armenian, Assyrian and ancient Egyptian. He would form a library with reportedly over 6,000 volumes of books about oriental studies, philology and archeology. While at his stay at New York University together with Charles H. Thomas, a philologist and translator, he established New York City's Philological Society in 1866.

=== Political career ===
Davis was a member of the Democratic Party, and in 1873 was elected into the Connecticut House of Representatives representing Meriden, and again from 1885 to 1886. On December 21, 1886, Davis was elected as Mayor of Meriden and won a re-election in 1887, and stayed as mayor until 1888 when he denied his nomination of mayor. He was again candidate for mayor in 1911, and was believed to have been elected, but a recount gave the election to his Republican opponent.

=== Later life and death ===
Davis remained active in scientific societies until his death on November 7, 1917, in the Connecticut Valley Hospital.
