= Charles H. Davis (judge) =

American judge

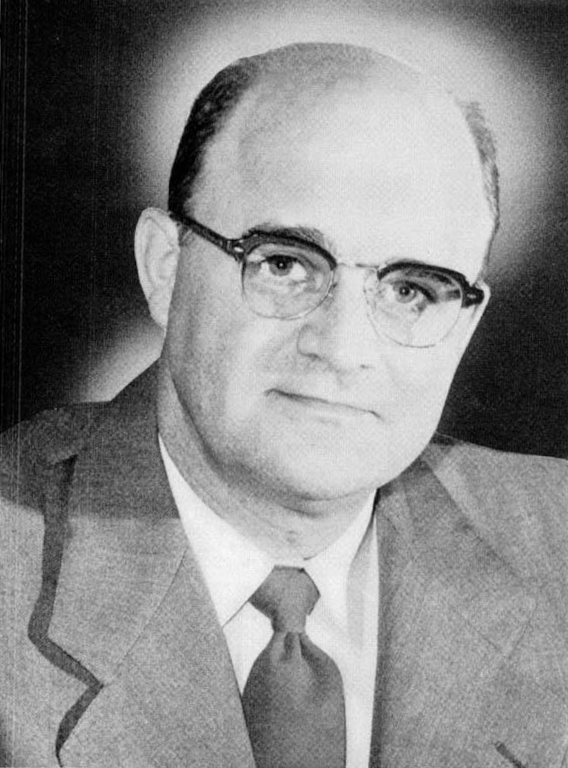
Davis's official photograph, c. 1947.

Charles Hubbard Davis (January 7, 1906 – February 22, 1976) was a Republican lawyer who has twice served on the Illinois Supreme Court, once as Chief Justice, and on the Illinois Appellate Court, also as Presiding Justice.

Davis was born, grew up and attended school in Fairfield, Illinois. He graduated from the University of Illinois (A.B., 1928) and the University of Chicago (J.D., 1931) and became a lawyer in Rockford in 1931. He married Ruth Peugh on October 19, 1935, and had seven children.

He was elected to the Illinois Supreme Court from the 6th District in 1955, serving until 1960, and was its Chief Justice from 1957 to 1958. He was elected to the 2nd District of the Illinois Appellate Court in November 1964 and was its Presiding Justice in 1967 and in 1970. From the 2nd District, he was elected a second time to the Supreme Court in November 1970; he retired from the court in October 1975.

He was in the Phi Delta Phi legal fraternity and was a Congregationalist and Shriner.

He died on February 22, 1976, in his Rockford home.
