= Charles William Davis =

American serial killer and rapist

- Born: Charles William Davis Jr. June 18, 1947 (age 79); Baltimore, Maryland, U.S.
- Conviction: First degree murder (3 counts)
- Penalty: Life imprisonment

Details
- Victims: 4+
- Span of crimes: 1974–1977
- Country: United States
- State: Maryland
- Date apprehended: September 1, 1977
- Imprisoned at: Jessup Correctional Institution, Jessup, Maryland

Charles William Davis Jr. (born June 18, 1947) is an American serial killer and rapist who killed four women and raped several others in Baltimore, Maryland from 1974 to 1977. Because of his thirst for media attention and to confuse the investigators, he called the authorities anonymously and provided directions to where he had left the bodies. Following his arrest, he was found guilty and sentenced to life in prison.

== Biography ==
Little is known of Davis' background. Born on June 18, 1947, in Baltimore, he was the son of a police lieutenant who worked in the city. Beginning in the late 1960s, Davis changed several professions, working as an electrician, security guard and volunteer assistant chief of staff for the Baltimore Volunteer Rescue Squad.

In the early 1970s, he began taking courses at a medical school to become a laboratory technician. Davis, who was married and had a son, later divorced his wife and moved in with a single mother whom he had met during his volunteer work. Due to his work, Davis had many acquaintances among local law enforcement, which allowed him to study the authorities' investigation methods and come up with ways to prevent capture when he started committing crimes. In 1973, he was convicted of a violation concerning a handgun, but it's unclear if he served a prison sentence for this crime.

== Murders ==
In late 1974, Davis witnessed a traffic accident involving a 23-year-old woman. After offering to help her, he instead dragged her to a nearby wooded area, where he raped and attempted to strangle her. The victim lost consciousness, and with Davis thinking that she had died, he left. Some time later, the woman regained consciousness and managed to make her way back to town, where she was given proper medical attention. She later told of her experience to the police officers, who created a facial composite of her attacker.

On August 24, 1975, Davis went to a bar in Howard County, where he met 20-year-old Roseann "Ann" Sturtz. According to investigators, he lured her to an isolated area, where he sexually assaulted and murdered her. Davis' body was found four months later on December 15, in Columbia. Unlike his later murders, Davis was not charged with this case due to a lack of conclusive evidence, leaving the case unsolved until March 2025.

On September 11, Davis went on a date with Lydia Victoria Norman. He propositioned her for sex but she refused, so Davis strangled her, dragged her body out of the car, and dumped her on the ground.

A few months later, Davis lost custody of his son, after which he decided to assault a female social worker who he believed was instrumental in him losing the case. On New Year's Eve, he lured the victim from a nightclub and into his car, before rapidly speeding away. On the way, however, Davis realized that he had kidnapped the wrong person: the woman inside was 24-year-old Kathleen Diane Cook, a stranger with no relation to his court case. She started to demand her release, threatening Davis with legal troubles as she was the fiancée of a high-ranking police officer in the Baltimore Police Force. Her threats were ignored, with Davis eventually stopping at a vacant lot of a mall in Catonsville, where he proceeded to rape her. Despite this, Cook continued to threaten and humiliate her assailant, saying that he was impotent and unpopular with women. Angered by her attitude, Davis then shot her four times with a .38-caliber revolver, which failed to kill her. Cook then ran towards his car and attempted to sound the car horn, but Davis caught up with her and stabbed her several times, killing her in the process.

On August 24, 1976, Davis was driving along I-95 when he was approached by 23-year-old Peggy Ellen Pumpian, who wanted to ask for directions to the Chesapeake Bay Bridge. After a brief conversation, he started tailing her vehicle and eventually forced her to pull over, claiming that he could show her another route. Pumpian allowed him inside her car, whereupon Davis spent some time mapping a route with a pencil before he pulled out his revolver and demanded that she give him money. After she gave him her money, Davis raped Pumpian at gunpoint. During an attempted escape, Pumpian hit him in the face, resulting in a fierce struggle during which Davis shot her five times in the chest, killing her. He then wiped off his fingerprints from the victim's car and left, travelling for New York to make himself a credible alibi. Pumpian's body was discovered eight hours later, and after extracting the bullets from her body, authorities decided to conduct a ballistics test on them. The results showed that the rifling marks of the revolver's barrel corresponded with the one used in the Cook killing, which led investigators to connect the two cases.

On September 3, Davis raped a 21-year-old woman he had met on I-95 - for unknown reasons, he let the victim live and simply left her after the assault. On February 23, 1977, he lured a 24-year-old pregnant woman, Carol Willingham, into his car, under the pretext of helping her. He then drove to a wooded area outside of town, where he beat, robbed and raped her before releasing her.

== Arrest ==
On July 20, 1977, Davis was pulled over by two police officers, David Horan and Gary Hartman, who had noticed that the license plates on his Volkswagen Beetle had been stolen. During subsequent questioning, he admitted to stealing the license plates, but refused to tell why. After allowing them to inspect the interior of his car, Hartman discovered a CB radio under one of the car seats. Upon consulting with his colleagues, it was determined that the radio had been stolen, whereupon he and Horan arrested Davis for theft and transported him to the county jail.

While at the county jail, Davis maintained his innocence and provided the investigators with a receipt from a store in Baltimore which showed that he had purchased it legally. Because of this, the theft charge was dropped and he was set free, but upon further inspection it was discovered that the radio had been purchased with a stolen credit card. That credit card belonged to the husband of Carol Willingham, who was then brought to the police station and presented with a photograph of Davis - upon seeing it, she immediately identified him as her assailant. Shortly afterwards, authorities issued an arrest warrant.

On August 31, it was established that Davis was working as an ambulance dispatch-helper in Reno, Nevada, which led to his arrest by local police on the following day. Three days later, he was extradited back to Baltimore to await trial. On the way there, Davis told the escorting officers that he wanted to confess to the murder of Peggy Pumpian. After he was read his Miranda rights, Davis was brought to the police station, where he subsequently confessed to killing both Pumpian and Cook on videotape. The day after, he was formally indicted with their murders.

== Trial ==
In the aftermath of Davis' arrest, a number of high-ranking law enforcement officials organized a meeting to discuss how they would prosecute the case. Although all the murders were committed within Baltimore, it was decided that Davis would be tried in separate trials in different venues, as the prosecutor's office feared that Davis might not be given a fair trial due to the publicity surrounding his crimes. As a result, Davis was transferred to Allegany County, where he was charged with Cook's murder. He was ultimately found guilty by jury verdict in early 1978, and sentenced to life in prison on April 12 of that year.

Afterwards, Davis was put on trial for Pumpian's murder. Since he was already serving a life term, his attorneys filed a motion for a mistrial, which was granted by the court. Nevertheless, he was found guilty in a second trial and sentenced to a second life term in April 1979. His attorney, Arnold M. Zerwitz, attempted to convince the jury that his client had been pressured into confessing by officers, but his arguments were found to be unconvincing and were ignored.

In early 1979, Davis was transferred to Anne Arundel County, where he was put on trial for killing Norman. In the early months of the following year, he was found guilty yet again and sentenced to a life term with a chance of parole after 48 years. While the sentence was read out, Davis did not react in any way and remained completely calm throughout the procedures.

== Aftermath ==
Since his conviction, Davis has remained incarcerated, spending his years around various penitentiaries in the state. In the early 1980s, he was interviewed on several occasions by FBI agent John E. Douglas, with the aim of creating offender profiles that would aid in the capture of future serial killers.

In March 2025, Davis was officially identified as the killer of Roseann Sturtz. In a press release, the Howard County Police Department stated that he had identified her from a photograph during an interview with law enforcement in November 2024. However, as he was still under legal immunity when he was initially questioned about the case in 1981, he will not be prosecuted for her murder.

As of March 2025, Davis is still alive and currently serving his sentence at the Jessup Correctional Institution in Jessup.

== See also ==
- List of serial killers in the United States
- List of serial rapists
