= Charles Davis (land purchase agent) =

New Zealand interpreter, writer and land purchase agent

- Born: Charles Oliver Bond Davis c. 1818; Sydney, Colony of New South Wales
- Died: 28 June 1887
- Resting place: Waikumete Cemetery, Glen Eden
- Occupations: Interpreter, writer, land purchase agent

Charles Oliver Bond Davis (c. 1818 – 28 June 1887) was a New Zealand interpreter, writer and land purchase agent. He was born in Sydney, New South Wales, Australia in c. 1818.

Davis worked as a Māori language interpreter during the signing of the Treaty of Waitangi in 1840.

In January 1868, he stood in a by-election in the City of Auckland. East electorate for the Auckland Provincial Council. He was beaten by William John Hurst.

He was buried at Waikumete Cemetery in Glen Eden.
