= Charles Davis (flute player) =

Australian jazz flautist

Charles Davis (born 29 September 1946 in Sydney, Australia) is a jazz flautist, currently living in Germany.

== Recordings ==
- 1983 – Folkjazz Duo – Charles Davis and Stefan Schmidt
- 1985 – Acoustic Works – Charles Davis and Stefan Schmidt – (Chef Records)
- 1987 – Blues bis Bossa – Acoustic Duo
- 1988 – Captured Moments – Charles Davis and Andreas Piesch – (Chef Records)
- 1991 – Nomadic Instincts – Charles Davis – (L+R Records)
- 1993 – Influtenza – Four or more Flutes – (L+R Records)
- 1995 – Strange Goodbyes – Charles Davis and Captured Moments – (L+R Records)
- 1999 – Back to the Flutes – Four or more Flutes – (KlangRäume Records)
- 2000 – Key Stories – Charles Davis and Captured Moments – (KlangRäume Records)
- 2001 – Spirit of the House – Ensemble Chanchala – (KlangRäume Records)
- 2003 – Lines – Duo Bubachala
- 2005 – Fluturistic – Four or more Flutes – (KlangRäume Records)
- 2006 – The Day the Swallows Came – Ensemble Chanchala – (KlangRäume Records)
- 2008 – Pathways – Charles Davis and Captured Moments – (Tonsee Records)
- 2012 – Ragastan – Duo Bubachala – (Tonsee Records)
- 2015 – Nexxt – Charles Davis & Captured Moments – (Tonsee Records)
