= Charles T. Davis (poet) =

Charles Thomas Davis (March 26, 1888 – December 21, 1945) was a poet and journalist from Arkansas. In 1923, the Arkansas General Assembly appointed him the first Poet Laureate of the state.
