= John Davis =

John Davis may refer to:

== Academics ==
- John A. G. Davis (1802–1840), professor at the University of Virginia School of Law, shot to death by a student
- John Aubrey Davis Sr. (1912–2002), African American activist and political science professor
- John Adelbert Davis (1871–1934), American bible college founder
- John Davies (lecturer) or Davis (fl. 1816–1850), English chemist and lecturer
- John Davis (academic) (1938–2017), English anthropologist and Warden of All Souls College, Oxford
- John Emmeus Davis (born 1949), scholar, writer and community organizer
- John J. Davis (theologian) (born 1936), American theologian, archaeologist, and Christian educator
- John Jefferson Davis, professor of theology and Presbyterian pastor
- John June Davis (1885–1965), American entomologist
- John Warren Davis (college president) (1888–1980), African American educator, college administrator, and civil rights leader
- John Davis (paediatrician) (1923–2025), British professor of paediatrics

== Arts and entertainment ==
=== Art ===
- John Davis (sculptor) (1936–1999), Australian sculptor
- John F. Davis (artist) (born 1958), Australian artist, painter and video editor
- John Philip Davis (1784–1862), British portrait and subject painter
- John Scarlett Davis (1804–1845), English painter

=== Fictional characters ===
- John Davis, in the 1908 film After Many Years
- John Davis (EastEnders), on the British soap opera Eastenders
- Sergeant John Davis, a playable character in Call of Duty 2

=== Film and television ===
- John Davis (producer) (born 1954), American film producer
- John Davis (filmmaker) (1944–2015), Australian documentary filmmaker
- John A. Davis (born 1961), American animator
- John Davis (television personality) (born 1944), American television presenter and journalist
- John T. Davis (filmmaker) (born 1947), Northern Irish documentarian

=== Music ===
- John Davis (singer) (1954–2021), American singer
- Blind John Davis (1913–1985), American blues pianist
- John Davis (pianist) (born 1957), American classical pianist
- John Davis (album), 2005, by singer-songwriter John Davis
- John Davis and the Monster Orchestra, 1970s band
- John Davis (singer-songwriter) (born 1974), Superdrag member
- John David Davis (1867–1942), English composer

=== Writing ===
- John Gordon Davis (1936–2014), Rhodesian writer of adventure novels
- John H. Davis (author) (1929–2012), American author of books on the Bouvier/Kennedy families and the Mafia
- John T. Davis (fl. 1968–present), American music journalist and author (mostly novels set in Texas)

== Law ==
- John Davis (U.S. district court judge) (1761–1847), Massachusetts state representative and federal judge
- John Davis (United States Court of Claims judge) (1851–1902), Assistant Secretary of State and judge of Court of Claims
- John F. Davis (lawyer) (1907–2000), Clerk of the Supreme Court of the United States
- John Warren Davis (judge) (1867–1945), NJ State legislator and Judge, Third Circuit Court of Appeals
- Bancroft Davis (John Chandler Bancroft Davis, 1822–1907), Supreme Court Reporter of Decisions, 1883–1902

== Military ==
- John Davis (American Civil War sailor) (died 1863), United States Navy, Medal of Honor recipient for actions in 1862
- John Davis (American Civil War soldier) (1838–1901), United States Army, Medal of Honor recipient for actions in 1865
- John Davis (Medal of Honor, 1881) (1854–1903), United States Navy, Medal of Honor recipient for actions in 1881
- John Davis (Medal of Honor, 1898) (1877–1970), United States Navy, Medal of Honor recipient for actions in 1898
- Sir John Davis (RAF officer) (1911–1989), Royal Air Force air chief marshal
- John Edward Davis (Royal Navy officer) (1815–1877)
- John J. Davis (general) (1909–1997), U.S. Army, Military Intelligence
- John K. Davis (1927–2019), U.S. Marine Corps
- John L. Davis (1825–1889), admiral in the United States Navy
- Sir John Davis (British Army officer) (1832–1901), British general
- John Davis, officer of the British commando Force 136 in WWII Malaya

== Politics ==
=== United States ===
- John Davis (Kansas politician) (1826–1901), U.S. representative from Kansas
- John Davis (Massachusetts governor) (1787–1854), governor of Massachusetts, 1834–1835; 1841–1843; U.S. senator and U.S. congressman
- John Davis (Oregon politician), member of the Oregon House of Representatives
- John Davis (Pennsylvania politician) (1788–1878), U.S. representative from Pennsylvania
- John H. Davis (diplomat) (1904–1988), U.S. assistant secretary of agriculture and Director of UNRWA
- John E. Davis (North Dakota politician) (1913–1990), governor of North Dakota, 1957–1961
- John E. Davis (Texas politician) (born 1960), Texas state representative, 1999–2015
- John G. Davis (1810–1866), U.S. representative from Indiana
- John James Davis (1835–1916), representative from West Virginia
- John Morgan Davis (1906–1984), lieutenant governor of Pennsylvania
- John W. Davis (governor) (1826–1907), governor of Rhode Island
- John W. Davis (1873–1955), Democratic U.S. presidential candidate, 1924
- John W. Davis (New Jersey politician) (1918–2003), speaker of the New Jersey General Assembly
- John Wesley Davis (1799–1859), U.S. representative from Indiana, governor of Oregon Territory
- John William Davis (Georgia politician) (1916–1992), U.S. representative from Georgia
- John C. Davis, labor economist and U.S. president Harry S. Truman staff member

=== Other countries ===
- John Francis Davis (1795–1890), British governor of Hong Kong and minor poet
- John Davis (Australian politician) (1817–1893), Australian pastoralist in colonial Western Australia
- John Caswell Davis (1888–1953), Canadian senator
- Jack Davis (Canadian politician) (1916–1991), from British Columbia

== Sports ==
=== Baseball ===
- John Davis (pitcher, born 1883) (1883–1946), Negro leagues pitcher
- John Davis (pitcher, born 1963) (born 1963), Major League Baseball player
- Quack Davis (John Davis, 1886–1981), Negro leagues outfielder
- Red Davis (John Humphrey Davis, 1915–2002), Major League Baseball third baseman

=== Cricket ===
- John Brewer Davis (1741–1817), English cricketer
- John Davis (cricketer, born 1882) (1882–1963), English cricketer for Derbyshire
- John Davis (Worcestershire cricketer) (1884–1951), English cricketer
- John Davis (cricketer, born 1939), Welsh cricketer
- John Davis (cricketer, born 1943) (1943–2000), English cricketer

=== Other sports ===
- John Davis (footballer), soccer player
- John Davis (offensive lineman) (born 1965), American football offensive lineman
- John Davis (tight end) (born 1973), American football tight end
- J. Elwood Davis (1892–1974) American football player
- J. R. Davis (1882–1947, John Ryland Davis), American college football player
- John Davis (rower) (1929–2017), American Olympic rower
- John Davis (skier), American para-alpine skier
- John Davis (speedway rider) (born 1954), English speedway rider
- John Davis (swimmer) (born 1978), New Zealand swimmer
- John Davis (weightlifter) (1921–1984), American Olympian, gold medalist
- John S. Davis (1898–1985), American head college football coach for the Ottawa University Braves, 1930
- John Davis, Jr., (born 1953), American boxer and convicted serial killer who used the ring name Steve Hearon
- John Davis (wrestler) (1893–?), British Olympian

== Other people ==
- John Clements Davis (born 1938), American geologist
- John Davis (British businessman) (1906–1993), English managing director of the Rank Organisation, later chairman
- John Davis (buccaneer) (alias of Robert Searle), English buccaneer
- John Davis (explorer) (1550–1605), English navigator and explorer
- John Davis (entrepreneur) (born 1953), American entrepreneur
- John Davis (sealer) (1784–1???), English-born American who claimed to have first set foot on Antarctica
- John Bunnell Davis (1780–1824), English physician
- John King Davis (1884–1967), Australian explorer and navigator
- John Marsh Davis (1931–2009), American architect
- John P. Davis (1905–1973), African-American activist and writer
- John H. Davis (publisher) (died 1896), African-American newspaper publisher, politician and land speculator in Roanoke, Virginia
- John E. Davis (architect) (1891–1961), college football player and architect in Birmingham, Alabama
- John Merle Davis (1875–1960), American missionary
- John R. Davis Jr. (born 1927), American diplomat

== See also ==
- Jack Davis (disambiguation)
- John E. Davis (disambiguation)
- John W. Davis (disambiguation)
- John Warren Davis (disambiguation)
- Johnny Davis (disambiguation)
- Jon Davis (disambiguation)
- Jonathan Davies (disambiguation)
- Jonathan Davis (disambiguation)
- Johnathan Davis (disambiguation)
- List of people with surname Davis
