= J.E. Davis =

J.E. Davis may refer to the following people:

- Jack Davis (veteran) (John Edward Davis, 1895–2003), British World War I veteran
- John E. Davis (North Dakota politician) (1913–1990), governor of North Dakota, 1957–1961
- John E. Davis (architect) (1891–1961), American architect and college football player
- John E. Davis (Texas politician) (born 1960), member of the Texas House of Representatives, 1999 to present
- John Edward Davis (Royal Navy officer) (1815-1877)
- J. Elwood Davis (1892-1974) American football player
- John Emmeus Davis (born 1949), scholar, writer, teacher and community organizer
