= John Warren Davis =

John Warren Davis may refer to:

- John Warren Davis (judge) (1867–1945), New Jersey legislator and judge, Third Circuit Court of Appeals
- John Warren Davis (college president) (1888–1980), African American educator, college administrator, and civil rights leader

== See also ==
- John Davis (disambiguation)
- John W. Davis (disambiguation)
- Warren Davis (disambiguation)
