= Jonathan Davis (disambiguation) =

Jonathan Davis (born 1971) is an American musician, the lead singer of Korn.

Jonathan Davis may also refer to:

- Jonathan Davis (fencer) (born 1960), British (Northern Ireland) Olympic fencer
- Jonathan Davis (journalist) (born 1954), British author, editor and journalist specialising in finance
- Jonathan Davis (baseball) (born 1992), American baseball outfielder
- Jonathan Davis (sprinter) (born 1988), Bahamian sprinter
- Jonathan D. Davis (1795–1853), U.S. politician, member of the Michigan Senate
- Jonathan M. Davis (1871–1943), U.S. politician
- Jonathan R. Davis (1816–?), American west gunfighter
- Q-Tip (musician) (born 1970), American rapper and producer, born Jonathan Davis

== See also ==
- Jon Davies, American meteorologist
- Jonathan Daviss (born 2000), American actor
- Johnathan Davis (disambiguation)
- Johnny Davis (disambiguation)
- Jon Davis (disambiguation)
- Jonathan Davies (disambiguation)
