= Palmer Hayden =

American painter (1890–1973)

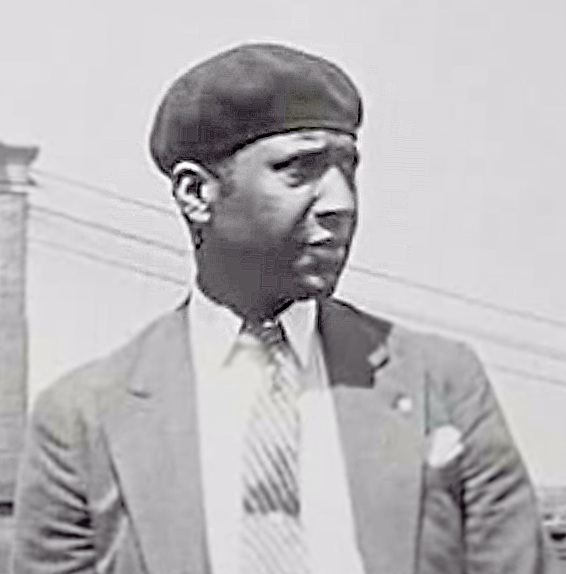
- Judging a scene he is painting (early 1930s).
- Born: Peyton Cole Hedgeman; January 15, 1890; Widewater, Virginia
- Died: February 18, 1973 (aged 83)
- Education: Columbia University and Cooper Union
- Known for: Painting
- Notable work: The Janitor Who Paints, Fetiche et Fleurs, and His Hammer in His Hand
- Movement: Harlem Renaissance

Palmer C. Hayden (born Peyton Cole Hedgeman; January 15, 1890 – February 18, 1973) was an American painter who depicted African-American life, landscapes, seascapes, and African influences. He sketched, painted in both oils and watercolors, and was a prolific artist of his era.

== Early life ==
Originally named Peyton Cole Hedgeman, Hayden was born on January 15, 1890, in Widewater, Virginia. Hayden was introduced to the arts by his older brother, who took up drawing at an early age. Despite his early interest in art, Hayden had ambitions to become a fiddle player. Unfortunately, several obstacles prevented this, including his reserved nature and financial instability in his family. Despite his great success as an artist, Hayden would later come to regret his decision to abandon his initial dream. Bitter frustration lingered in Hayden's mind as is reflected in some of his work. Midnight at the Crossroads is a painting that depicts the decision he was forced to make. While the notable tilt of his feet and face illustrate his inclination towards the path of the musician, he ultimately chooses the other road. This piece demonstrates the personal significance of Hayden's conflict.

Hayden moved to Washington, D.C. during his teenage years in order to find work to make a living. He worked as a carrier and an errand boy while finding inspiration for his work from the everyday bustle of the city. It was in Washington, D.C. where Hayden ultimately began to pursue an art career, and where he first encountered an experience with explicit racism. Hayden had placed an ad in the local paper for an artist's assistant, and was bewildered when he was rejected for being African-American upon arriving at the interview. Discouraged, Hayden decided to go into employment as a laborer for the Buffalo Bill Circus and then the Ringling Brothers Circus. He bounced from occupation to occupation with little commitment, then decided to enter the army's black company stationed in the Philippines.

Hayden enlisted into the military in 1912. While enrolled, he found himself pleased with the amount of spare time he had and even found a tutor in second lieutenant Arthur Boetscher, who enjoyed map drawing and would often loosely instruct Hayden. This was Hayden's first true experience with artistic education. After four years of service in the military, Hayden decided to re-enlist. He was assigned to the 10th Cavalry at West Point where his role was taking care and training the horses that the cadets learned to ride on. At this time, he also enrolled into a correspondence drawing course, on which he spent $10 of the $18 he made monthly.

After he was discharged from the army, he relocated to Greenwich Village, a neighborhood located in lower Manhattan within New York City. During the pursuit of his developing art career, he worked as a postal clerk, janitor, and a variety of other part-time jobs in order to provide for himself. This period of his life was difficult, but was nevertheless worthwhile as Hayden became a prolific Harlem artist of his era.

== Artistic beginnings and Parisian travels ==
Hayden pursued artistic professionalism by studying charcoal drawing at Columbia University as he simultaneously worked nights at the post office. When Hayden decided his post office job took up too much of his time, he quit and began janitorial services in various apartment buildings throughout New York City. Coincidentally, the first tenant he worked for was Victor Perard, an artist and art instructor at the Cooper Union, previously called the Cooper Institute. Hayden was hired to clean Perard's studio and was encouraged to continue to develop his art.

In 1925, Hayden had an opportunity to study under Perard at the Cooper Union in New York City. In the same year, he traveled to Maine to study at Boothbay art colony. A chance encounter with Alice Dike, a woman for whom he was moving furniture, led to the discussion of art and his experience as an artist. Compelled by his cause, Dike provided him with a brochure from her church broadcasting The Harmon Foundation's Award for Distinguished Achievement, which encouraged individuals to participate and enter their pieces. Hayden decided to enter and in 1926, he won a sum of money and a gold medal for his painting Schooners after being recognized as the recipient of the Distinguished Achievement in Visual Arts in the Harmon Foundation's first awards ceremony. In response to this honor, a New York Times headline crudely glorified him, stating "Negro Worker Wins Harmon Art Prizes: Gold Medal and $400 Awarded to Man who Washes Windows to Have Time to Paint", suggesting his employment and race were defining factors of his craft as opposed to his extensive efforts. While racially involved themes were not quite yet prominent concepts in Hayden's work, The Harmon Foundation's white founder William E. Harmon was nonetheless making a blatant social statement by publicly praising art created by an African-American man from a struggling background. The award is additionally credited for launching his career as an artist because of how prestigious of an accomplishment it was seen for anyone, but especially for a simple janitor.

Hayden's success with The Harmon Foundation resulted in his premier solo show in April 1926 at the Civic Club. Following his achievements, Hayden combined accumulated funds, as well as his trophy money from The Harmon Foundation and a gracious gift of $3,000 from Dike, to travel to Paris, France for five years, where he found further inspiration for his art. He did not enroll in art school there but rather learned from experience. Hayden captured not only Parisian society, but also the integration of Afro-European into the upscale environment. He was mentored for a short while by an artist named Clivette Le Fevre, but ultimately, the relationship ended because of Le Fevre's disbelief in Hayden's talents. Hayden's years in Paris, as well as his arguably primitive style, is particularly evident in the 1930 piece Nous Quatre a Paris, which portrays four black men in a cafe, drawn with stereotypically large lips and cartoonish facial features to emphasize characteristically black features that were shunned and often seen as revolting, as a result of the discourse from white beauty.

While in France, Hayden did not remain stationed in Paris and also traveled to the coasts in order to continue painting landscapes and seascapes. He was particularly fond of Concarneau, a small village primarily sustained by fishermen, and painted several scenes of the town, one of which being Andrée de la Mer. He also visited several museums and a variety of exhibits, such as the Louvre, and found inspiration within its walls. Hayden became acquainted with philosopher Alain Locke, who showed him African art he had collected from his extensive travels. Hayden's admiration for African art led him to paintings depicting African designs, patterns, and forms, such as Fetiche et Fleurs in 1933. He was also fascinated by the establishment of colonial Northern African towns and sketched what he saw in museums and exhibits.

== Return, racial commentary and stylistics ==
After five years abroad, traveling with funds borrowed from the American Aid Society of Paris, a non-profit organization meant to support Americans abroad, Hayden decided to return to the United States on August 11, 1932. He remained in New York City, where he had lived before going abroad, and upon his return, he became a Works Progress Administration artist with an impressive salary of about $30 weekly.

In contrast to his active involvement with African culture and racism abroad, Hayden painted mostly buildings and landscapes at this time. In his free time, he continued with oil and watercolor paintings, but also dabbled in pen and ink drawings. His artwork is most notable for depicting African-American life during the Harlem Renaissance, as well as racial conflicts/obstacles, perceptions of racism, and African folklore. His paintings have been described by some critics as primitive and demeaning for depicting xenophobic stereotypes of African Americans by exaggerating bosoms, lips, and nostrils and portraying the mass consumption of watermelon and other foods associated with black racism, such as in The Watermelon Race. Other art historians find some of the earliest indications of black empowerment in Hayden's work for his ownership and embracement of defining stereotypes that he regurgitated at critics through their exaggerated impact. A great number of his paintings following his years in Paris were associated with the Harlem Renaissance and black urban life in the city. However, while depictions of African-American life are what he is most remembered for, they are not his sole claim to fame; Hayden's career began with landscape portrayal and this continued simultaneously alongside his racially influenced art, with nature originally more prominent than the depictions of African-American life. A particular interest of his was seascapes and life in bustling harbors, as it had been in his adolescence. These particular scenes often held a religious significance for him, which was not further elaborated on by Hayden. Additionally, as his comfort within the artistic community grew, he offered a political voice in his paintings, and in 1935, he depicted The Execution of NIRA, which referenced the Supreme Court's refusal of the National Industrial Recovery Act on the grounds of unconstitutionality. Hayden branching out artistically became more evident as his work became more outspoken and experimental.

One of Hayden's most notable works is The Janitor Who Paints (1937). This painting, labeled a protest painting à la The Execution of NIRA, was thought by critics to be a personal commentary on Hayden's sentiments regarding the assorted, meagerly paid early jobs he had to take in order to survive that he was criticized for in the press. Despite his success and popularity not only in America, but also in Europe, Hayden was still regarded by some as a lowly janitor who had little to no artistic training and worth. In this painting, an African-American woman, man, and child are depicted in a crowded area which is made even more stifled by a canvas, cleaning supplies, and simple home decoration. All three are shown with thick, prominent lips, characteristic of caricatures of African people, and in the first draft, a bold portrait of Abraham Lincoln was hung on the wall. The title of the painting, as well as the contrast of cleaning supplies and art material, imply a balance, such as the one that existed in Hayden's own life before he was recognized for his work. Inevitably, Hayden was scrutinized by both the black and white community as problematic for seemingly endorsing negative stereotypes in this painting as well.

== The aged Hayden ==
Ten years after his initial visit in 1926, Hayden returned to Paris briefly; little else is known about this visit. He was back in New York within a year and at the age of 50, he married Miriam Huffman. He decided in 1944 to begin a new project, which resulted in a three-year effort that culminated his most fulfilling works: The John Henry series. The idea was rooted in a legend he had been told in childhood by his father and he took to researching the legitimacy of the folktale, drawing inspiration to integrate into his art. Any other explanations for why Hayden felt so strongly about John Henry and the series as a whole are unclear and unspecified, but are most likely linked to his proud ties to the African-American community.

In his elder years, Hayden continued to be active with his art, regularly being selected for prestigious awards and traveling between Paris and the United States to fuel his inspiration. Racism remained a relevant topic in his life and art, leading him to publicly speak out against racist policies hindering the African-American and Hispanic communities. An example of this was seen in 1966, when Hayden wrote to William Booth, the Chairman of the City Commission on Human Rights, regarding the advocacy for an equal number of African Americans, Latinos, and white people on the board to prevent mistreatment fueled by prejudice and power.

Hayden died on February 18, 1973, shortly after receiving a grant to depict African American soldiers between the world wars.

== Works ==
- The Janitor Who Paints, original, oil on canvas, 1937
- The Janitor Who Paints, revised, oil on canvas, Smithsonian, ca. 1937
- Fetiche et Fleurs, oil on canvas, 1926
- Nous quatre a Paris, watercolor, 1930
- Midsummer Night in Harlem, oil on canvas, 1936
