= Jack Davis =

Jack Davis may refer to:

== Arts and entertainment ==
- Jack Davis (actor) (1914–1992), American child actor
- Jack Davis (playwright) (1917–2000), Australian playwright and poet
- Jack Davis (cartoonist) (1924–2016), American cartoonist and illustrator

== Business and industry ==
- Jack Davis, American engineer who worked on the ENIAC computer in the 1940s
- Jack Davis (industrialist) (1933–2023), American industrialist
- Jack Davis, American businessman, co-founder of Novell

== Sports ==
- Jack Davis (English footballer) (1882–1963)
- Jack Davis (Australian footballer) (1908–1991)
- Jack Davis (hurdler) (1930–2012), American Olympic hurdler
- Jack Davis (guard, born 1932) (1932–2013), American football player for the Boston Patriots
- Jack Davis (guard, born 1933) (1933–2015), American football player for the Denver Broncos
- Jack Davis (rugby league), Australian rugby league player

== Others ==
- Mildirn, (a.k.a. Jack Davis, 1835–1914), Australian Aboriginal leader, translator and merchant
- Jack Davis (prospector) (1879–1949), American prospector
- Jack Davis (veteran) (1895–2003), British military veteran
- Jack Davis (Canadian politician) (1916–1991)
- Jack Davis (Illinois politician) (1935–2018)
- Jack L. Davis (born 1950), American archaeologist
- Jack E. Davis (fl. 2000s), American historian and Pulitzer Prize-winning author

== See also ==
- Jack Davies (disambiguation)
- John Davies (disambiguation)
- John Davis (disambiguation)
