= John W. Davis (disambiguation) =

John W. Davis may refer to:

- John W. Davis (1873–1955), Democratic U.S. presidential candidate, 1924
- John W. Davis (governor) (1826–1907), Governor of Rhode Island
- John W. Davis (New Jersey politician) (1918–2003), Speaker of the New Jersey General Assembly.
- John Ward Davis (died 1907), American politician from Maryland
- John Warren Davis (judge) (1867–1945), NJ State legislator and judge, Third Circuit Court of Appeals
- John Warren Davis (1888–1980), African American educator, college administrator, and civil rights leader
- John Wesley Davis (1799–1859), U.S. Representative from Indiana, Commissioner to China, Governor of Oregon Territory
- John William Davis (Georgia politician) (1916–1992), lawyer and U.S. Representative from Georgia
- John Davis (footballer) (middle name William), English footballer

== See also ==
- John Davis (disambiguation)
