= Jon Davis =

Jon Davis may refer to:

- Jonathan Davis (born 1971), lead vocalist and frontman for the nu-metal band Korn
- Jon Davis (poet) (born 1950), American poet
- Jon Davis (wrestler) (born 1979), American professional wrestler
- Jon Christopher Davis (born 1968), American musician and singer-songwriter
- Jon M. Davis, United States Marine Corps general
- Jon Davis (basketball) (born 1996), American basketball player

== See also ==
- Jonathan Davis (disambiguation)
- Jon Davies, American meteorologist
- John Davis (disambiguation)
