= Johnathan Davis =

Johnathan Davis may refer to:

- Johnathan Davis (politician) (born 1991), Former member of the Australian Capital Territory Legislative Assembly
- Johnathan Davis (businessman), owner of Newsweek, founder of IBT Media

== See also ==
- Jonathan Davis (disambiguation)
- John Davis (disambiguation)
- Johnny Davis (disambiguation)
