= Jonathan Davies =

Jonathan Davies may refer to:

- Jonathan Davies (rugby, born 1962), Welsh dual-code rugby player and TV pundit
- Jonathan Davies (rugby union, born 1988), Welsh rugby union player
- Jonathan Davies (cricketer, born 1976), former English cricketer
- Jonathan Davies (cricketer, born 1980), former Welsh cricketer
- Jon Davies, American meteorologist and storm chaser
- Jonathan Davies (English priest) (died 1809), Canon of Windsor and headmaster of Eton College
- Jonathan Ceredig Davies (1859–1932), Welsh traveller and writer
- Jonathan Davies (Welsh priest) (born 1969), Welsh Anglican priest
- Jonathan Davies (athlete) (born 1994), English middle- and long-distance runner
- Jonathan Davies (politician), British MP for Mid Derbyshire
- Jonno Davies (born 1992), English actor

== See also ==
- Jonathan Davis (disambiguation)
- John Davies (disambiguation)
- John Davis (disambiguation)
