= John H. Davis =

John H. Davis can refer to:

- John H. Davis (author) (1929–2012), American author
- John H. Davis (diplomat), American academic and diplomat
- John H. Davis (publisher)

== See also ==
- Jack Davis (actor) (born John H. Davis, 1914–1992), American actor
