= Warren Davis =

Warren Davis may refer to:

- Warren R. Davis (1793–1835), American attorney and representative
- Warren Davis (basketball) (born 1943), basketball player
- Warren Davis (actor), American actor and classic arcade game inventor
- Warren Davis (broadcaster) (1926–1995), Canadian television journalist
- Warren B. Davis (1865–1928), American painter and illustrator
- John Warren Davis (judge) (1867–1945), American politician and judge
- John Warren Davis (1888–1980), African American educator, college administrator, and civil rights leader
- Warren Davis (singer) (d. 2018), British pop singer and composer
- Warren Davis (footballer) (born 2005), Irish professional footballer
