= Blind Tom Wiggins =

American pianist and composer (1849–1908)

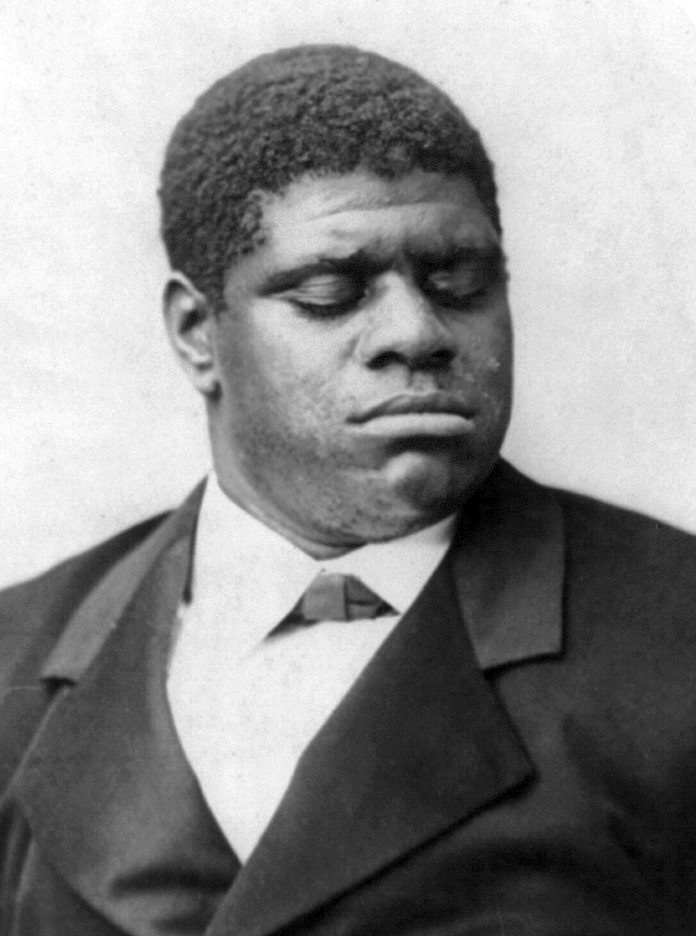
Tom Wiggins, 1880

Thomas "Blind Tom" Wiggins (May 25, 1849 – June 14, 1908) was an American pianist and composer. He had numerous original compositions published and had a lengthy and largely successful performing career throughout the United States. During the 19th century, Wiggins was one of the best-known American performing pianists and one of the best-known Black musicians.

== Early life ==
Wiggins was born Thomas Greene on the Wiley Edward Jones Plantation in Harris County, Georgia. Blind at birth, he was sold in 1850 along with his enslaved parents, Charity and Domingo "Mingo" Wiggins, to a Columbus, Georgia, lawyer, General James Neil Bethune. Bethune was "the first [newspaper] editor in the south to openly advocate secession". Wiggins's name was variously reported as "Thomas Greene Bethune", "Thomas Wiggins", or "Thomas Bethune"; his name was changed due to his slave status. The headstone at his grave reads "Thomas Greene Wiggins".

Because Tom was blind, he could not perform work normally demanded of slaves. Instead, he was left to play and explore the Bethune plantation. At an early age, Tom showed an interest in the piano after hearing the instrument played by Bethune's daughters. By age four, he reportedly had acquired some piano skills by ear, and gained access to the piano. By age five, Tom reportedly had composed his first tune, The Rain Storm, after a torrential downpour on a tin roof. With his skills recognized by General Bethune, Tom was permitted to live in a room attached to the family house, equipped with a piano. Neighbor Otto Spahr, reminiscing about Tom in the Atlanta Constitution in 1908 (as reproduced in The Ballad of Blind Tom, by Deirdre O'Connell), observed: "Tom seemed to have but two motives in life: the gratification of his appetite and his passion for music. I don't think I exaggerate when I state that he made the piano go for twelve hours out of twenty-four."

As a child, Tom began to echo the sounds around him, repeating accurately the crow of a rooster or the singing of a bird. If he was left alone in the cabin, Tom was known to begin beating on pots and pans or dragging chairs across the floor in an attempt to make any kind of noise. By the age of four, Tom was able to repeat conversations up to 10 minutes in length but was barely able to adequately communicate his own needs, resorting to grunts and gestures.

Another example of Tom's extraordinary abilities was shown after he was taken to a political rally in 1860 in support of Democratic presidential candidate Stephen Douglas. Years after he had attended this speech, he was still able to repeat it while capturing the tone and mannerisms of Douglas. Additionally, he was able to recreate the heckles and cheers of the crowd with remarkable precision.

Bethune hired out "Blind Tom" from the age of eight years to concert promoter Perry Oliver, who toured him extensively in the US, performing as often as four times a day and earning Oliver and Bethune up to $100,000 a year, an enormous sum for the time, "equivalent to $1.5 million/year [in 2004], making Blind Tom undoubtedly the nineteenth century's most highly compensated pianist". General Bethune's family eventually made a fortune estimated at $750,000 at the hands of Blind Tom. Oliver marketed Tom as a "Barnum-style freak" advertising the transformation from animal to artist. In the media, Tom was frequently compared to a bear, baboon, or mastiff.

Bethune hired professional musicians to play for Tom, who could faithfully reproduce their performances, often after a single listening. Eventually he learned a reported 7,000 pieces of music, including hymns, popular songs, waltzes, and classical repertoire.

== Professional career ==
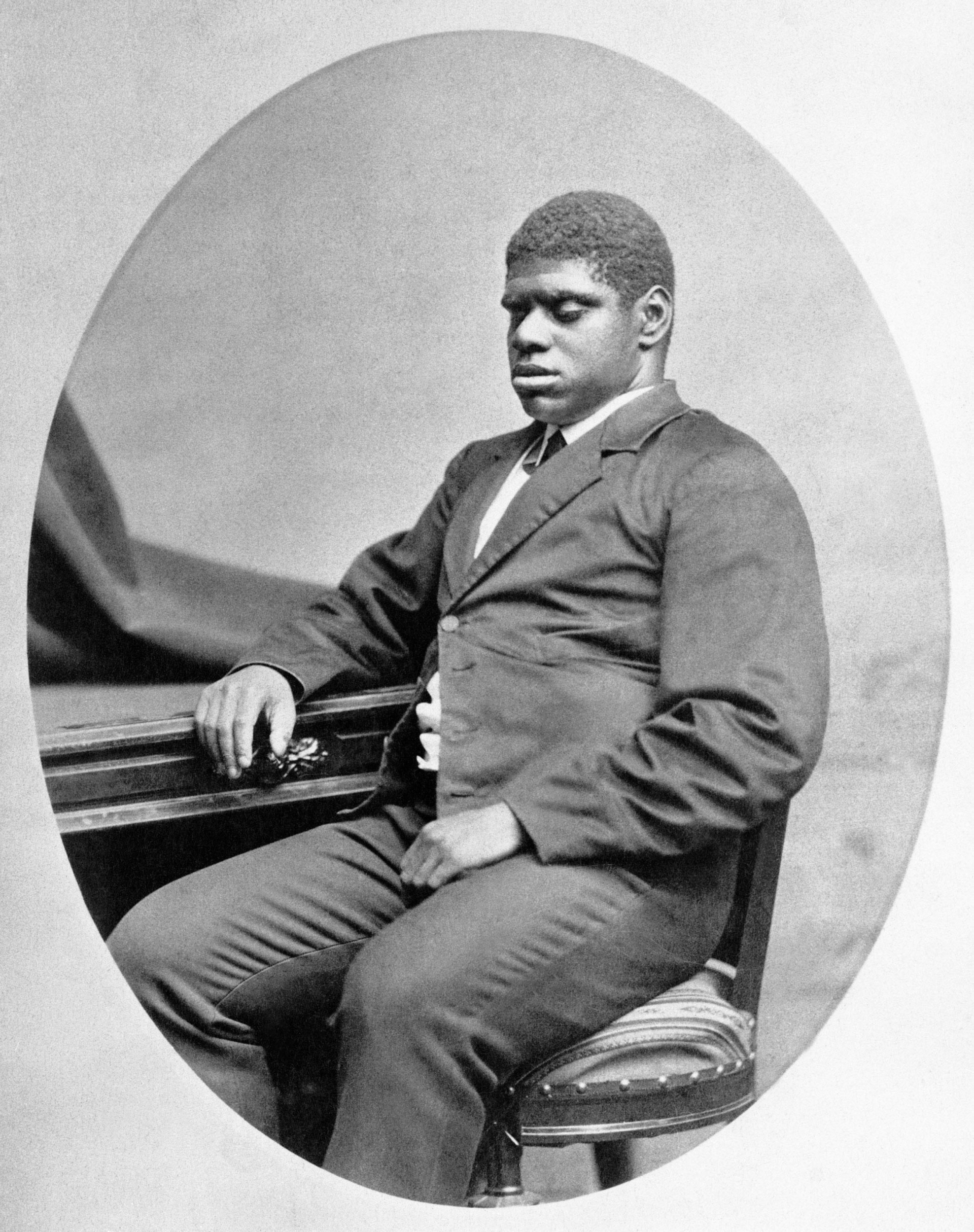
Blind Tom Wiggins seated

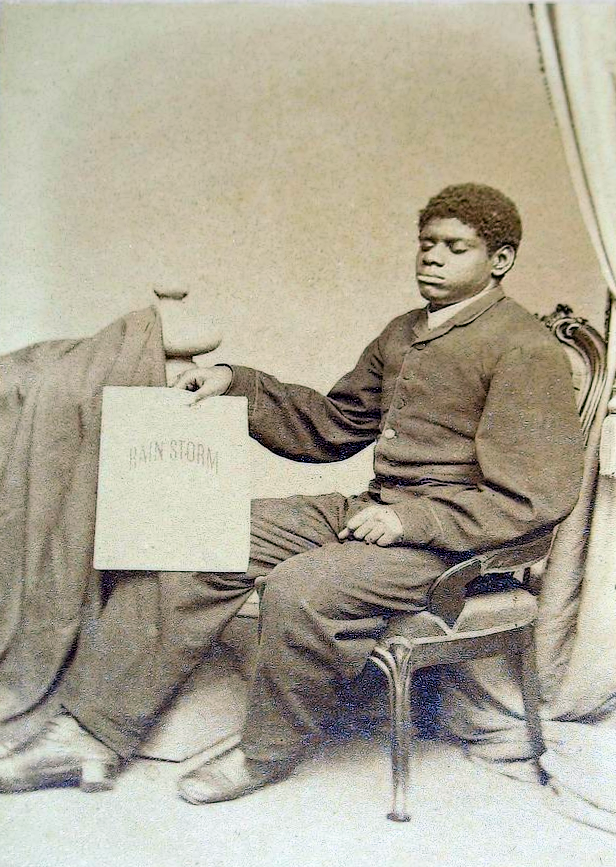
Blind Tom c. 1861

There are conflicting historical accounts of Blind Tom's first public performance, some indicating he was as young as three. One account from 1857 indicates that he had been performing publicly for several years. Newspaper reviews and audience reactions were favorable, prompting General Bethune to undertake a concert tour with Tom around their home state of Georgia. Tom later toured the South with Bethune or accompanied by hired managers, though their travels and bookings were sometimes hampered by the north–south hostilities which were drawing the nation towards Civil War. In 1860, Blind Tom performed at the White House before President James Buchanan; he was the first African-American to give a command performance at the White House. Mark Twain attended many of Blind Tom's performances over several decades and chronicled the proceedings.

On- and off-stage, Tom often referred to himself in the third person (e.g., "Tom is pleased to meet you"). His piano recitals were augmented by other talents, including uncanny voice mimicry of public figures and nature sounds. He also displayed a hyperactive physicality both onstage and off. A letter written in 1862 by a soldier in North Carolina described some of Tom's eccentric capabilities: "One of his most remarkable feats was the performance of three pieces of music at once. He played 'Fisher's Hornpipe' with one hand and 'Yankee Doodle' with the other and sang 'Dixie' all at once. He also played a piece with his back to the piano and his hands inverted." At concerts, skeptics attempted to confirm if Tom's performance replications were mere trickery; their challenge took the form of having Tom hear and repeat two new, uncirculated compositions. Tom did so perfectly. The "audience challenge" eventually became a regular feature of his concerts.

Supposedly, Tom's talents profited the Confederacy during the Civil War. His most famous piece, "The Battle of Manassas", is the story of the Confederate Army's 1861 victory at the Battle of Bull Run. As a result, many black newspapers refused to celebrate him, pointing out that he served to reinforce negative stereotypes about African-American individuals and that he was only a source of profit for slaveholders.

The Emancipation Proclamation in 1862 freed all slaves in the Confederate states; all US slaves were not freed until the Thirteenth Amendment passed in December 1865. In 1866, at age 16, Tom was taken on a European concert tour by General Bethune, who collected testimonials about Tom's natural talents from composer-pianist Ignaz Moscheles and pianist-conductor Charles Hallé. These were printed in a booklet, "The Marvelous Musical Prodigy Blind Tom", and used to bolster Tom's international reputation.

In 1875, General Bethune transferred management of Blind Tom's professional affairs to his son John Bethune, who accompanied Tom on tour around the U.S. for the next eight years. Beginning in 1875, John brought Blind Tom to New York each summer. While living with John in a boarding house on the Lower East Side, Tom added to his repertoire under the tutelage of Joseph Poznanski, who also transcribed new compositions by Tom for publication. Many of these were, at Tom's insistence, published under such pseudonyms as Professor W. F. Raymond, J. C. Beckel, C. T. Messengale, and Francois Sexalise.

Tom's piano-playing behavior, both during practice and performance, was eccentric. "We had two pianos in one room", Poznanski told the Washington Post in 1886 (as recounted in O'Connell's biography). "I would play for him and he would get up, walk around, stand on one foot, pull his hair, knock his head against the wall, then sit down and play a very good imitation of what I had played with additions to it. His memory was something prodigious. He never forgot anything." This led some critics to dismiss Tom as a novelty act, a "human parrot." Novelist Willa Cather, writing in the Nebraska State Journal, called Tom "a human phonograph, a sort of animated memory, with sound producing power."

John Steinbeck has compared the main character in a short story of his, "Johnny Bear", to Blind Tom.

No original recordings of Blind Tom appear to exist. His sheet music is available, but only a small number of musicians have ever recorded his original songs.

== Custody battle ==
In 1882, John Bethune married his landlady, Eliza Stutzbach, who had demonstrated a knack for mollifying Tom's sometimes volatile temperament. However, shortly after their marriage, John Bethune embarked on an extended tour of the U.S. with Tom, in effect abandoning Eliza. When Bethune returned home eight months later, his wife filed for divorce. The couple split up—John took Tom—but a bitter legal squabble ensued, with Eliza hounding John for financial support, a claim that the courts usually adjudicated in John's favor. After John Bethune died in a railway accident in 1884, Tom was returned—over Eliza's objections—to the care of General Bethune (now living in Virginia). Eliza sued General Bethune for custody, with Tom's elderly mother Charity enjoined by Eliza's attorney as a party in the plaintiff's suit. After a protracted custody battle in several courts, in August 1887 Tom was awarded to Eliza, who moved Tom back to New York. Charity accompanied them with the understanding that she would benefit financially from Tom's earnings. However, after it became apparent that Eliza did not intend to honor any financial obligations to Charity, Tom's mother returned to Georgia.

Tom continued performing and touring for a number of years under the management of Eliza and her attorney (and later husband) Albrecht Lerche. Tom was on tour in western Pennsylvania in May 1889 on the day of the Johnstown Flood, and rumor spread that he was among the casualties. Despite his continued appearances on the U.S. concert circuit, the rumor persisted for years, with some observers expressing skepticism that the Blind Tom who appeared in concert after 1889 was the "real Blind Tom".

In this phase of his career, Tom usually introduced himself onstage in the third person, imitating the pronouncements of his various managers from years past. He talked about his mental state with a characteristic lack of self-awareness. He had been diagnosed as non compos mentis by a doctor, and seemed to take the phrase as a matter of personal pride. Willa Cather described the poignancy of one such concert: "It was a strange sight to see him walk out on stage with his own lips—another man's words—introduce himself and talk quietly about his own idiocy. There was insanity, a grotesque horribleness about it that was interestingly unpleasant. One laughs at the man's queer actions, and yet, after all, the sight is not laughable. It brings us too near to the things that we sane people do not like to think of."

Tom was still traveling, and presumably still performing, in 1894. On July 5 of that year, he arrived in Grand Junction, Colorado, on his way eastward from California. The trainmen at that place were on strike against the railroads as part of the Pullman Strike, and Tom was stuck in town until July 9, when he continued eastward via the Colorado Midland Railroad.

After being dogged by incessant legal challenges to her custodianship of Tom, Eliza took Tom off the concert circuit in the mid-1890s.

== Later years ==
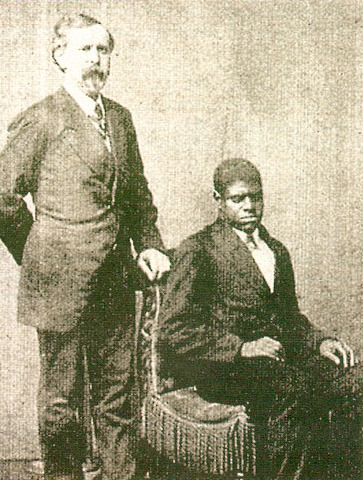
Wiggins with his former enslaver, General James N. Bethune

Tom spent the next ten years as a ward of Eliza and her husband, who divided their time between New York City and New Jersey's Navesink Highlands. In 1903, Eliza arranged for Tom to appear on the popular vaudeville circuit, beginning with Brooklyn's Orpheum Theater. He spent almost a year performing in vaudeville, before his health began to deteriorate. It is believed that Tom experienced a stroke (described in some reports as "partial paralysis") in December 1904, which ended his public performing career.

After the death of her husband, Eliza relocated to Hoboken, New Jersey, with Tom. They kept out of public view, though neighbors could hear Tom's piano playing at all hours of the day and night. Tom experienced a major stroke in April 1908, and died the following June. He was 59 years old. Tom was buried in the Cemetery of the Evergreens in Brooklyn, New York.

== Posthumous recognition ==
The people of Columbus, Georgia, raised a commemorative headstone for Tom in 1976. He was the subject of a play titled HUSH: Composing Blind Tom Wiggins, by Robert Earl Price, which was performed on the Atlanta stage with Del Hamilton as director.

Between 1970 and 2000, Dr. Geneva Handy Southall wrote a three-volume thesis titled Blind Tom: The Black Pianist Composer; Continuously Enslaved; it was published by Scarecrow Press in 2002.

In 1981, Tom was the subject of a film, Blind Tom: The Story of Thomas Bethune, directed by Mark W. Travis.

In 1999 John Davis recorded an album of Tom's original compositions on a CD entitled John Davis Plays Blind Tom. The CD package included essays by Amiri Baraka, Ricky Jay and Oliver Sacks.

In 2006, Reagan Grimsley published an article about preserving the sheet music of Blind Tom for future generations. Titled "Discovering "Blind" Tom Wiggins: Creating Digital Access to Original Sheet Music at the Columbus State University Archives", it appeared in Music Reference Quarterly.

A full-length biography, The Ballad of Blind Tom, by Deirdre O'Connell was published by Overlook Press in 2009.

Andre T. Regan's 2013 documentary, The Last Legal Slave in America, documents the life and times of Blind Tom.

The Elton John song "The Ballad of Blind Tom", from his 2013 album The Diving Board, is about Blind Tom.

Blind Tom Wiggins is the subject of a novel, The Song of the Shank, (2014) by Jeffrey Reynard Allen.

Blind Tom Wiggins is also the subject in a sequence of poems in Olio (2016) by Tyehimba Jess.

In 2019, Blind Tom was featured on a mural depicting the history of performing and visual arts in New Braunfels, Texas as part of the city's 175th anniversary celebration.
