= Victor Pérard =

American artist and illustrator (1870–1957)

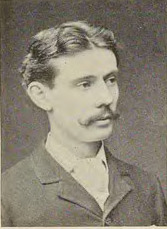

Victor Semon Pérard (1870-July 9, 1957) was an illustrator and author.

Perard attended the Art Students League and National Academy of Design in New York as well as the Ecole des Beaux Arts in Paris. He studied anatomy at New York University Medical College and taught life drawing classes at Cooper Union for 20 years and at the Traphagen School of Fashion in New York for 10 years.

Perard authored the well-known book Anatomy in Drawing as well as Drawing Horses, Faces and Expressions, Sketching Landscape, Blackboard Fun, Drawing Animals, Drawing Horses, and How to Draw. His etchings, aquatints and lithographs are in the Metropolitan Museum of Art's collection, and his oil paintings of General John J. Pershing and Marshal Foch are at the Smithsonian War Museum in Washington D.C. His artworks are also held by the New York Public Library, the Library of Congress, the Museum of the City of New York, and the American Watercolor Society. He was survived by his wife, Ernestine.

He was co-illustrator with Warren B. Davis of Herbert Ward's (1863–1919) Five Years with Congo Cannibals.

Alphaeus Philemon Cole painted a portrait of him. The New York Times ran his obituary July 10, 1957.

== Works ==
=== Author and illustrator ===
- Anatomy and Drawing
- Blackboard Fun
- Drawing Animals
- Drawing Horses
- Sketching Landscape

=== Illustrator ===
- Some strange corners of our country: the wonderland of the Southwest by Charles F. Lummis (1892), one of the illustrators'
- The Czar's Gift (1906)
- The Son of Columbus by Molly Elliot Seawell (1912)
- The Misadventures of Joseph by J. J. Bell (1914)
- Everybody's birthright: a vision of Jeanne d'Arc by Clara E. Laughlin
- The Man of the Desert (c. 1914) by Grace Livingston Hill'
- The Castle of Cheer (1916)
- Dominie Dean : a novel by Ellis Parker Butler Fleming H. Revell Company (1917)
- A Maid of Old Virginia (1915), a romance of Bacon's rebellion
- The forsaken inn; a novel by Anna Katharine Green'
- In African Forest and Jungle by Paul B. Du Chaillu
- King Mombo by Paul B. Du Chaillu'
- Through Swamp and Glade: A Tale of the Seminole War, by Kirk Munroe
- With Crockett and Bowie: or, Fighting for the Lone-Star Flag by Kirk Munroe, Scribner (1925)
- Five Years with Congo Cannibals. (1890)'
