= Violeta Autumn =

American architect

- Violeta Autumn, Sausalito, CA, 1973
- Born: May 20, 1930; Peru
- Died: February 5, 2012; Sausalito, California
- Education: University of Oklahoma
- Occupation: Architect
- Awards: American Institute of Architects, Bay Area Honor Awards 1974, Design Excellence, Souverain Winery, with John Davis & Schaaf-Jacobs-Vinson, Engineers
- Practice: Autumn & Associates; Architects Planners; Davis-Autumn & Associates Architects-Planners
- Buildings: 521 Sausalito Blvd., Sausalito, California 6 Unit Apartment Building for Fred R. Winn, Mill Valley, California Caletti Jungsten (Office) Building With John Marsh Davis wineries in the Napa Valley AVA including Souverain Winery, Joseph Phelps Vineyards, Rutherford Hill Winery, Sullivan Vineyards
- Projects: As Planner and City Councilmember: Schoonmaker Project, Deak Office Park(aka Harbor Drive Executive Office Park), Whiskey Springs: a Condominium Subdivision, all of Sausalito, California. As Muralist and Artist with other architects: First National Bank of Nevada on the south shore of Lake Tahoe in California and in Reno Nevada

Violeta Autumn née Eidelman (May 20, 1930 – February 5, 2012) was a Peruvian-born, naturalized American citizen, who became a noted architect and artist in the San Francisco Bay Area, based in Sausalito, California. She was best known for her works in Organic Architecture, the home she built for herself, and her winery designs with her associate John Marsh Davis as licensed architect in the firm Davis-Autumn Architects Planners. In addition to architecture, Autumn served on the Planning Commission and City Council for Sausalito from 1965 to 1980. She wrote cookbooks, designed murals, and illustrated books for other authors, as well.

== Early life ==
Violeta Eidelman was born in Chiclayo, Peru to Russian Jewish immigrants, whose father was artist Alberto Eidelman. She lived in Peru until she was fourteen, when she and her brother moved to the United States. Eidelman completed her elementary schooling in Lima and began her high school education in Panama, before moving to the United States to complete her secondary education at Norman High School. Her parents remained in Panama so that they could earn money for the children's education. Eidelman studied architecture at the University of Oklahoma under Bruce Goff, graduating in 1953, the third woman to graduate there with a Bachelor of Architecture, having also taken two years of engineering.

After graduation, Eidelman traveled in Europe over the summer, meeting her future husband on the return trip. In 1954, she married Sanford Autumn, a psychologist from Cleveland and relocated to the San Francisco Bay Area, obtaining her California architect's license in 1957, earning license number 2209.

== Career ==
Her first experience in architecture was preparing construction drawings for Harold Dow, an architect in Palo Alto, California. She also illustrated renderings for other architects and authors, and designed murals. In 1959 she designed and built her home and architectural studio on Sausalito Boulevard in Sausalito, California on the up-slope of a narrow winding street with a unique structural system on a vertical "cliff" site with structural engineer Haluk Akol. The building features a two-story copper hood to vent the fireplace, exposed concrete buttresses to stabilize the hill, and unpainted redwood stressing the theory of organic architecture taught by Goff and Frank Lloyd Wright and the truth in materials. This project was featured in Progressive Architecture magazine May 1964, in an article entitled "The Private World of An Individual" and Look magazine on July 13, 1965.

Autumn obtained U.S. citizenship in 1963 and within two years began involvement with local government, first being appointed in 1965 as a member of the Community Appearances Advisory Board. She became member and subsequently commissioner of the Planning Commission, until 1974, when she was elected as a Sausalito City Councilwoman. She was known for her strong environmental protectionism, opposition to council members economically benefiting from projects they approved, and her outspokenness. She served from 1974 to 1978 during the height of the rebuilding of a closed-over 100 acre shipyard sold by the US Government after World War II, Marinship on San Francisco Bay. During her term as City Councilwoman she played a significant role in the redevelopment of this and other former Marinship properties working with other architects including stopping overdevelopment projects offering to stud the shoreline of one of the most noted waterfronts in the world. One of these projects that was stopped was the first application of the Schoonmaker Project in 1972 on 37 acres by William Wurster and Don Emmons of Wurster, Bernardi & Emmons and one that was reduced in size was the six building Deak Office Park project to two buildings. She was instrumental in revising the Sausalito General Plan of 1963 and creating zoning for a working waterfront favorable to artists and small maritime businesses working alongside fellow Sausalito City Councilmember and later Mayor Sally Stanford. After her term ended as a councilwoman in 1978, she returned to the Planning Commission serving until 1980.

Autumn also worked with Wright's apprentice John Lautner and had an architectural vocabulary based strongly on her former instructor, Goff. During the seventies she had an architectural partnership Davis-Autumn & Associates, with another University of Oklahoma architectural graduate John Marsh Davis. The firm won awards for their work in winery architecture including the 1974 American Institute of Architects Bay Area Honor Award for in Design Excellence for the Souverain Winery with Schaaf-Jacobs-Vinson Engineers in the Napa Valley AVA, a juxtaposition of French country-architecture with Organic Architecture. Other notable buildings include projects with her partner Davis such as Joseph Phelps Vineyards, Rutherford Hill Winery, Sullivan Vineyards, all in Sonoma Valley and Napa Valley California, the Caletti Jungsten building (1986) in Mill Valley, California, a variety of projects for San Francisco developer Fred R. Winn. As an artist and interior architect she completed a variety of handcrafted murals for the 1st National Bank of Nevada in California and Nevada locations. The murals, housed in Lake Tahoe, Las Vegas and Reno, depicted pioneering figures of the west and were completed in an expressionist style.

Autumn was also a fine artist, holding exhibits of her work and completed illustrations for a book of poems written by San Francisco writer Alice Paula. She published a cookbook based on her mother's recipes, A Russian Jew Cooks in Peru, which she compiled and illustrated. She later published a second cookbook, Flavors of Northern Italy, which she also illustrated.

== Death and legacy ==
Autumn died on February 5, 2012. An exhibition being planned by the University of Oklahoma on The American School of Architecture to be presented in 2019 is to include her works for their representative qualities of the genre.

== Gallery ==
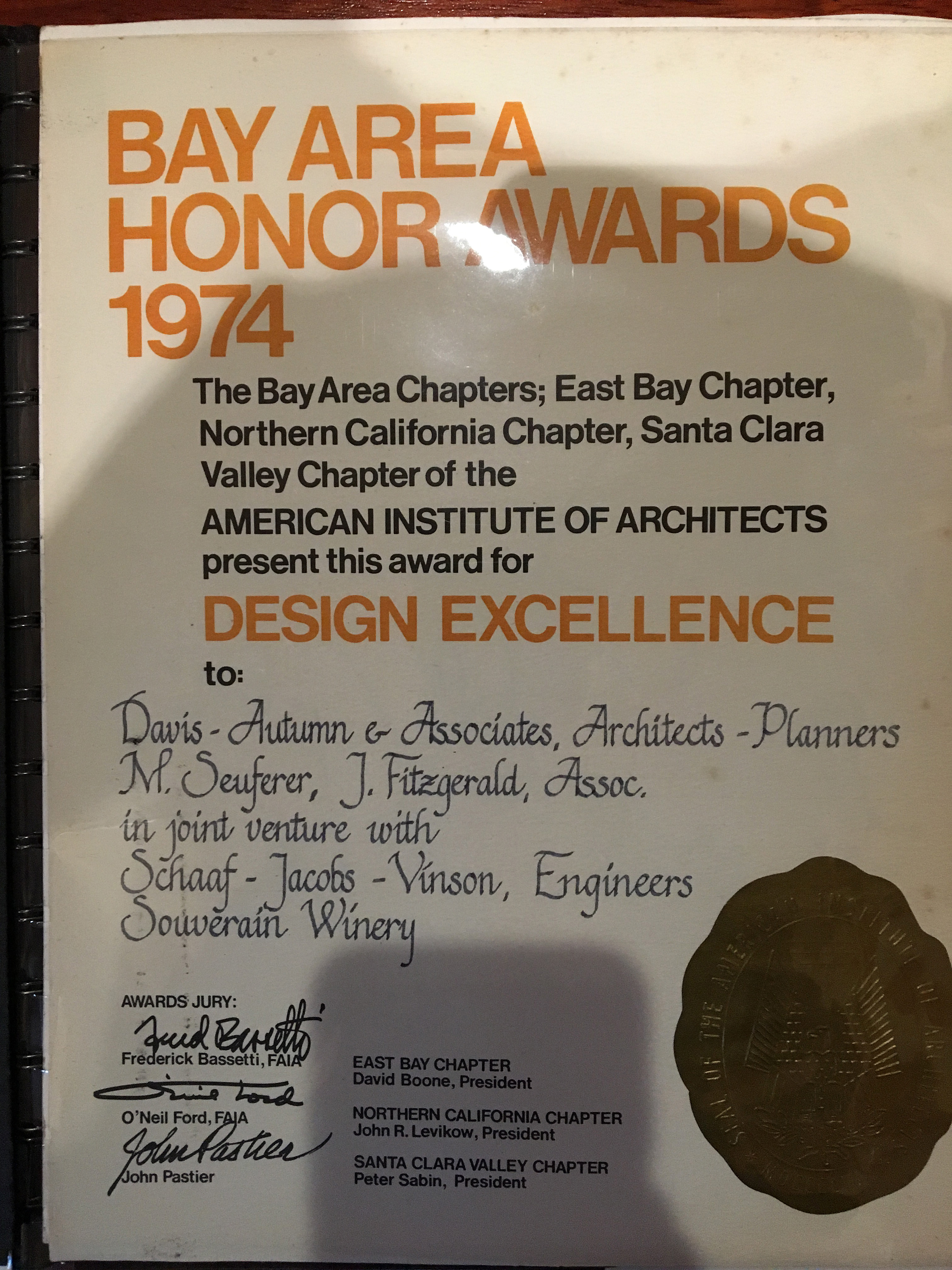
Bay Area Honor Awards 1974, Design Excellence, Davis-Autumn & Associates, Architects - Planners, M. Seuferer, J. Fitzgerald, Assoc. in joint venture with Schaaf-Jacobs-Vinson, Engineers, Souverain Winery

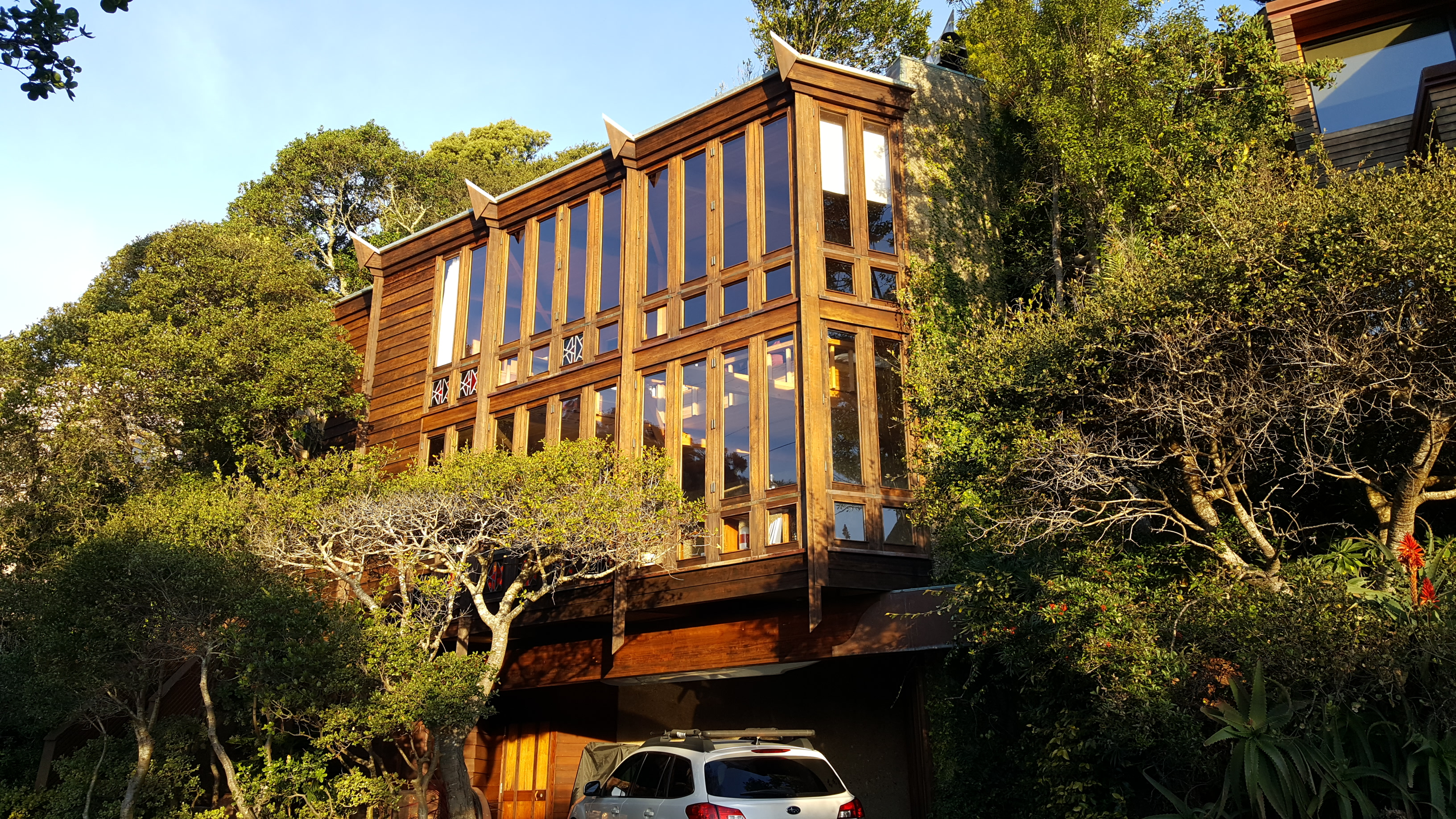
Cliff House. Autumn Organic Architecture

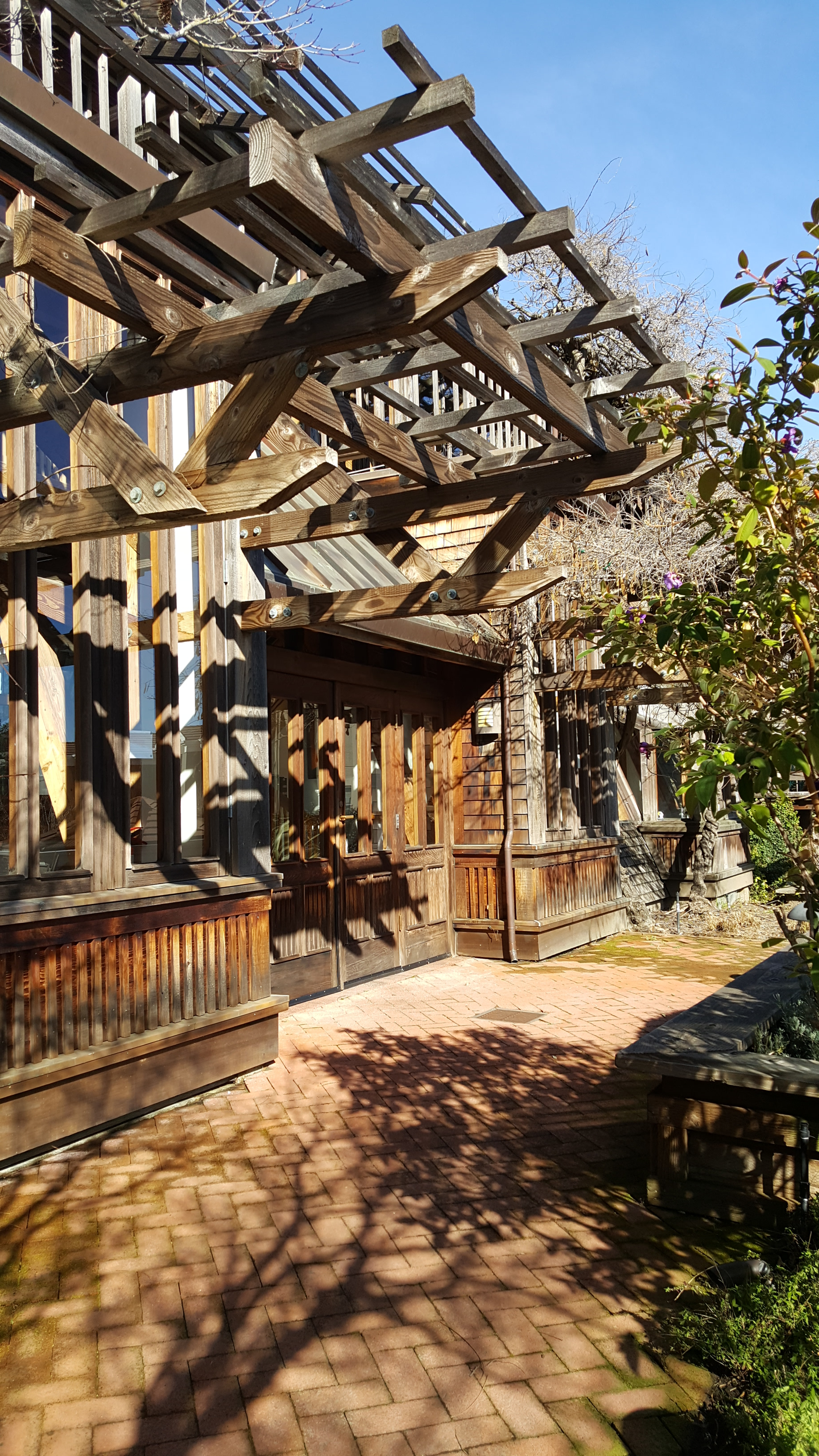
Caletti Jungsten building, Mill Valley, California
