= Jonathan Davis (journalist) =

British author, editor and journalist

Jonathan Davis (born 17 February 1954) is a British author, editor and journalist specialising in finance.

Educated at Winchester College and Cambridge University where he gained a master's degree in history, he became a senior business journalist at The Sunday Telegraph, The Times, and The Economist before taking a master's degree in management at the MIT Sloan School of Management where, in preparation for his thesis, he met and studied the methods of investor Warren Buffett.

From 1995 to 2007, he wrote a weekly column in The Independent. From 2006 to 2009, he wrote a fortnightly column in the Financial Times.

As of 2009, he writes a blog at Independent Investor, which he founded, and is investment director of Agrifirma, a specialist investment management company headed by investor Jim Slater. Since 2002, he has been chairman of the Savile Club in London.

== Bibliography ==
- Investing with Anthony Bolton ISBN 978-1-905641-11-6
- What Warren Buffett Thinks 2006
- What Warren Buffett Thinks 2005
- Money Makers ISBN 978-0-7528-1371-4
