= John Caswell Davis =

Canadian politician

The Honourable John Caswell Davis

Canadian Senator from Manitoba
- In office 25 January 1949 – 25 October 1953
- Constituency: Winnipeg, Manitoba

Personal details
- Born: August 19, 1888 Montreal, Quebec, Canada
- Died: October 25, 1953 (aged 65) Saint Boniface, Manitoba, Canada
- Party: Liberal
- Spouse: Priscilla Emmerling Guilbault (m. 1953)
- Children: 4
- Education: McGill University
- Occupation: Politician; civil engineer

John Caswell Davis (August 19, 1888 – October 25, 1953) was a Canadian politician and civil engineer.

== Biography ==
=== Early life and education ===
Born in Montreal, Quebec in 1888. He completed a degree in arts from Laval University, and after graduating from McGill University with a degree in Mechanical engineering he moved to Saint Boniface, Manitoba.

=== Political career ===
Bilingual and bicultural, John Caswell Davis's political abilities were appreciated as a bridge to unify a French minority intent on asserting itself culturally and politically within a Canada dominated by the English majority. Member of the Liberal Party and gifted orator John Caswell Davis entered the senate in 1949. His promising political career was cut short by his untimely death in 1953 while only 65 years old.

=== Other work ===
Caswell Davis drew inspiration from the 19th-century painters such as Millet and the Barbizon School's commitment to landscape, and the portrayal of members of society. Individuals from all stations of life were CD's subjects, including prime ministers and politicians, wealthy and famous, colourful voyageurs and trappers, members of first nation Canada, humble farmers, tradesmen, merchants, and housekeepers. A draughtsman and a caricaturist who drew inspiration from Daumier and the 19th-century tradition of satire and political cartoon, much of his best work involved an understated and quiet portrayal of the ironic and humorous spectacle of everyday experience. He was also deeply committed to the documentation of vanishing Aboriginal Canada. His fondness and fascination with native culture led to numerous portraits he executed while attending and participating in powwows and tribal gatherings across Canada.

He died on October 25, 1953 in Winnipeg.

== Personal life ==
He married Priscilla Guilbault (1896 - 1973) in 1916 and their union produced four children: James Edward Davis, Yvonne Davis, Lucille Davis, and Patricia Davis.
