= John T. Davis (filmmaker) =

Irish filmmaker

- Born: 7 March 1947 (age 79); Holywood, County Down, Northern Ireland
- Known for: Filmmaking, Documentary film
- Elected: Aosdána
- Website: johntdavisfilmandmusic.com

John T. Davis (born 7 March 1947) is a Northern Irish filmmaker.

== Early life ==
John T. Davis was born in Holywood, County Down in 1947.

== Career ==
Davis studied at Belfast Art College from 1967–71 and was influenced by D. A. Pennebaker, Frederick Wiseman and Peter Bogdanovich.

He was elected to Aosdána in 2005.
