= John Davis (pianist) =

American historian

John Davis (born October 22, 1957) is an American classical pianist, concert performer, recording artist, and historian. Born in Chapel Hill, North Carolina and raised in Providence, Rhode Island, Davis now lives in Brooklyn, New York. He has specialized in reviving the forgotten music of several 19th Century African-American pianists, including Blind Tom Wiggins and Blind Boone. He has recorded albums of works by both composers for the Newport Classic label.

Davis has performed solo piano recitals across the United States, toured Asia and Eastern Europe by invitation of the US State Department, and created several theatrically driven programs entitled The John Davis Caravan: Standing at the Crossroads, Will the Real Thomas Wiggins Please Stand Up!, and Halley's Comet: Around the Piano with Mark Twain & John Davis.

Time Out New York wrote that "Davis has made a mission of uncovering music by 19th-century black pianists, including slaves, whose work had a direct impact on the blues, jazz, rock, and R&B artists that came in their wake." His research and performances have been featured on NPR and television broadcasts and in newspapers and magazines, including The New Yorker and Scientific American. He has written articles on Blind Tom for several Oxford University Press books, including African American Lives (2004), Stress and Coping in Autism (2006), and African American National Biography (2008).

Several recordings by Davis of Blind Tom compositions were used in the soundtrack of Lorna Simpson's 2003 film Corridor.

In 2010, in commemoration of the 175th anniversary of the birth (and 100th anniversary of the death) of Mark Twain, Davis released Halley's Comet: Around the Piano with Mark Twain and John Davis, an album of repertoire based around Twain's fondness for the piano. Composers featured on the album include Louis Moreau Gottschalk, Franz Schubert, Blind Boone, Blind Tom, and Ossip Gabrilowitsch.

== Education ==
Davis studied at Brown University and received his Master's degree from Juilliard School. His teachers included Seth Carlin, Gabriel Chodos, Herbert Stessin, Aube Tzerko, and Beveridge Webster.

== Discography ==
- John Davis Plays Blind Tom: The Eighth Wonder (Newport Classic, 2000)
- Marshfield Tornado: John Davis Plays Blind Boone (Newport Classic, 2008)
- Halley's Comet: Around the Piano with Mark Twain & John Davis (Newport Classic, 2010)
