= John Marsh Davis =

American architect

John Marsh Davis (October 12, 1931 – February 22, 2009) was an American architect based in the San Francisco, California Bay Area. A graduate of the University of Oklahoma School of Architecture and a student of Bruce Goff from 1947 to 1955. Davis was known for his signature style of Organic Architecture in wineries, single family homes, and mixed use buildings in California and all over the world. He also was known for his organic interpretation of the American Craftsman style including the Alexander Julian Estate in Ridgefield, Fairfield County, Connecticut. In his design of the Joseph Phelps Winery he is referred to as "one of a cadre of architects who helped define California organic architecture". Some considered his aesthetic as bold and confrontational. John Marsh Davis' firm's most notable projects include winery architecture for Chateau Souverain Winery in Alexander Valley AVA (co-winner of the American Institute of Architects (AIA) design-excellence award in 1974), Joseph Phelps Winery, Sullivan Vineyards and Rutherford Hill Winery with his partner/architect Violeta Autumn as well as numerous private residences including the Donald Barbour house in Kentfield, California. Davis completed several projects with Joseph Phelps, who later bought the winery which bears his name. Phelps owned a large construction firm and he and Davis worked on Souverain Winery together. In his later career, Davis became well known for architectural landscaping.

== Notable buildings ==
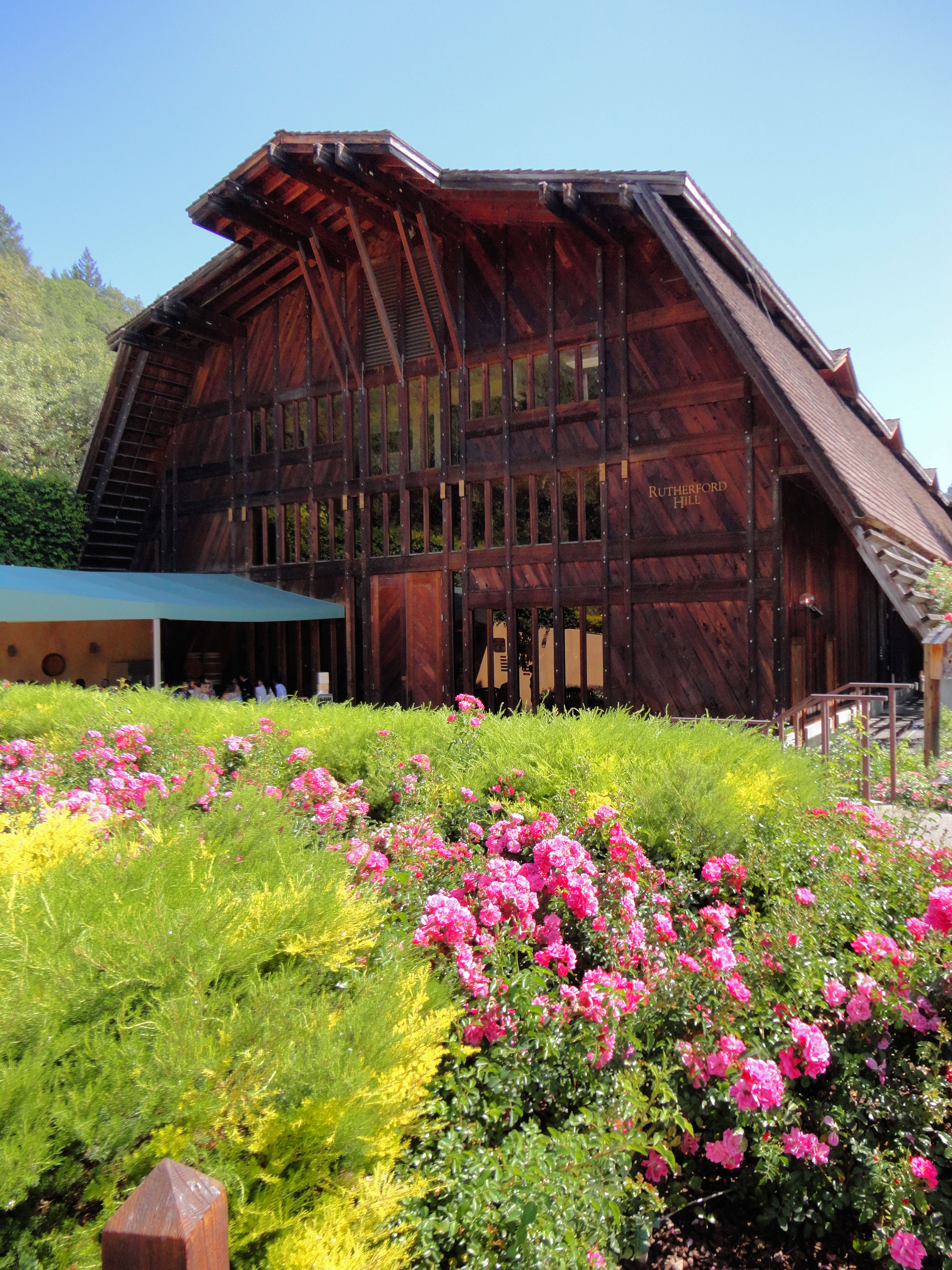
Rutherford Hill Vineyards, Napa Valley, California (8563637400)

John Marsh Davis and his firm became known for designing and siting memorable works of Organic Architecture and worked on numerous important, notable buildings where he was the design architect or partner in charge that have drawn the attention of experts in this style including:

- Chateau Souverain Winery in Alexander Valley AVA (1974)(became the Francis Ford Coppola Winery in 2011).
- Joseph Phelps Winery in Napa Valley AVA(1973)
- Rutherford Hill Winery in Napa Valley AVA(1972)
- Sullivan Vineyards in Napa Valley AVA
