= Widewater, Virginia =

Unincorporated community in Virginia, US

Coordinates: 38°27′53″N 77°19′31″W

Widewater is an unincorporated community in Stafford County, in the U.S. state of Virginia. Located on the banks of the Potomac River, it was the site of the flight experiments by Samuel Langley during the late 19th and early 20th century. It was a stop on the Richmond, Fredericksburg and Potomac Railroad which was replaced by CSX Transportation.
