= Johnny Davis (Australian footballer) =

Australian rules footballer (1876–1944)

Personal information
- Full name: John Henry Davis
- Born: 18 October 1876; Port Adelaide, South Australia
- Died: 20 April 1944 (aged 67); South Melbourne, Victoria

Playing career^{1}
Years	Club	Games (Goals)
1898–99	South Melbourne	10 (6)
- ^{1} Playing statistics correct to the end of 1899.

John Henry Davis (18 October 1876 – 20 April 1944) was an Australian rules footballer who played with South Melbourne in the Victorian Football League (VFL).
