= Johnny Davis =

Johnny Davis may refer to:

- Johnny Davis (basketball, born 1955), American former basketball player and coach
- Johnny Davis (basketball, born 2002), American basketball player
- Johnny Davis (American football) (born 1956), retired American football player
- Johnny Davis (Australian footballer) (1876–1944), Australian rules footballer
- Johnny Davis (kickboxer) (born 1962), American kickboxer
- Johnny Davis (baseball, born 1917) (1917–1982), American outfielder in Negro league baseball
- Johnny Davis (baseball, born 1990), American professional baseball outfielder
- Johnny Davis, team owner of JD Motorsports
- Johnnie Davis (1910–1983), American actor musician

== See also ==
- John Davis (disambiguation)
