= John H. Davis (publisher) =

- Born: c. 1831; Lynchburg, Virginia, United States
- Died: 1896; Roanoke, Virginia, United States
- Occupations: Newspaper publisher, politician, land speculator
- Known for: Founder of Roanoke Weekly Press; early African-American capitalist in Virginia

John H. Davis (1820s/c. 1831–1896) was an early African-American newspaper publisher, politician, capitalist and land speculator in Roanoke, Virginia. "He was shrewd and was quite successful in business, and accumulated a considerable sum of money, which he invested in real estate and continued to prosper. … He did all he could for the up-building of his race."

== Early life ==
John Davis was probably born in the 1820s, or possibly as late as the 1830s, and was listed as a Mulatto of mixed race on the census records in Campbell County, Virginia. Little is known about his early years. However, by the end of the Civil War he had taught himself how to read and write, and in 1869 he owned some property. His wife, Ann Eliza Stuart, and he probably had no children.

"Because of the era in which he was born, Davis was a self-made man. He was born in Lynchburg around 1831, and he was listed as "mulatto," or mixed-race, on census records. Although it is unclear whether he was ever a slave, by the end of the Civil War he had taught himself to read and write and set off for Big Lick, where land was cheap."

== Newspaper ==
John Davis began the Roanoke Weekly Press in 1891 along with Dr. Robert J. Boland, lawyer Thomas T. Henry, who helped write and edit the newspaper. This was the first black newspaper in Roanoke, and possibly southwestern Virginia. There is only a single edition preserved in the Library of Virginia, although some of the articles and editorials were reprinted in other black newspapers across the nation.

The newspaper was a fierce opponent to lynching and unequal sentencing of blacks in the courts. It supported the Republican Party in Roanoke, and demanded better schools. However, the newspaper also wrote about restraint. In an editorial that appeared in an early issue, the paper advocated the sort of self-reliance made popular by Booker T. Washington, encouraging local blacks to "work for ourselves: educate, educate, acquire property, establish businesses and encourage manufactories among our own people."

"His influence in the Gainsboro neighborhood and business district was so well-known that even white-owned businesses advertised in his paper, the Roanoke Weekly Press."

The short live newspaper was printed between May 9, 1891, when the first notice of the existence of the Roanoke Weekly Press appears in the New York Age, one of the most distinguished African American newspapers in the nation, and March 29, 1892, when the final mention of the Roanoke Weekly Press paper appears in the Roanoke Times. The Roanoke Weekly Press likely ceases operations in the next several months.

== Land Speculation ==
An early land speculator, he acquired over 30 pieces of property with at least one in every ward in Roanoke, and was worth about $50,000.00 to $75,000.00, and probably more. He helped turn the Gainsboro, Roanoke, Virginia neighborhood into a thriving commercial center. He had purchased land fairly cheaply before Big Lick was incorporated, renamed and turned into Roanoke, and afterwards the value of his properties had soared.

He constructed Davis Hall, a noted meeting place for black social activities. It was a wooden frame building of four floors, with rented commercial space and meeting rooms and also included a grocery and restaurant. He also constructed the Davis Hotel, a two-story frame building. "By 1893 Davis also was operating a drugstore, one of the earliest black-owned establishments of its kind in southwestern Virginia, and had employed Isaac D. Burrell, who later became a prominent physician and pharmacist." Dr. Burrell later bought the Davis Hall in 1896, and continued his drugstore at that location until it burned down in 1900.

== Politics ==
Davis was active in local politics. He was both a member of the Republican Party (United States), as well as the Virginian Readjuster Party. He ran for Roanoke's City Council twice in 1884 and 1885.

In 1884, John H. Davis represented the Ninth District at the Readjuster-Republican State Convention in Richmond. He was elected to attend that National Republican Convention in Chicago, but did not attend. By May 1884, he unsuccessfully ran for city council as a Republican in Roanoke's Second Ward. A year later, in May 1885, he unsuccessfully ran for city council as a Republican in Roanoke's Second Ward after black leaders nominated him despite lack of support from white leaders.

== Death and Burial ==
After the crash in 1893, John Davis developed stomach cancer, and died in 1896. His body lay in state at the Davis Hall, and his "handsome casket" was supplied by the Oakey & Woolwine funeral home. His obituary said, "Deceased did not belong to any church, although he was partial to the Baptist faith; he was also a Mason and an Odd Fellow."

He was then buried in the Davis Family Cemetery next to or near the public cemetery in the Gainsboro neighborhood. When the Interstate 581 was constructed in 1961, it is possible that John and Ann Davis were re-interred at Coyner Springs, "which used to be a city owned cemetery for indigent residents." Today he and his wife's grave site is unknown.
