= Warren B. Davis =

American painter (1865–1928)

Warren Burnham Davis (American, 1865–1928) was a commercial illustrator and fine artist active during the last decades of the 19th century and the first decades of the 20th. Davis was born in New York and studied at the Art Students League (founded 1875), a fine arts academy. Davis came of age during the 1880s when new mass market periodicals grew up among the newspaper printing trades located in Lower Manhattan: The Century (1881), The Ladies World (1886), Collier's (1888), Life, (1897), The Saturday Evening Post(1897),Vogue (1909), and Vanity Fair (1913). Davis provided editorial art, commercial illustration, and fine art to many of these periodicals and private clients up until his death in Brooklyn in 1928.

== Career ==
Much of Davis' early commercial work was editorial art for general interest magazines targeting female readers. He was one of many commercial and fine artists of the period who helped redefine the status and social stance of women in Gilded Age society. A skilled draughtsman, Davis also painted formal portraits, sentimental genre scenes, and other commissioned fine art for private clients.

During World War I, Frank Crowninshield (American, 1872–1947), the first editor of Vanity Fair (1913–1939), commissioned Davis to produce illustrated cover art. Davis’ Vanity Fair covers depicted sylph-like figures, imaginatively styled as 'woodland nymphs', dancing, jumping, or flying in outdoor settings. This series of Vanity Fair covers were Numbers 1/17, 1/18, 2/18, 9/18, 2/20, 9/20, 8/21, 10, 21, 8/24, 2/25, and 5/26.

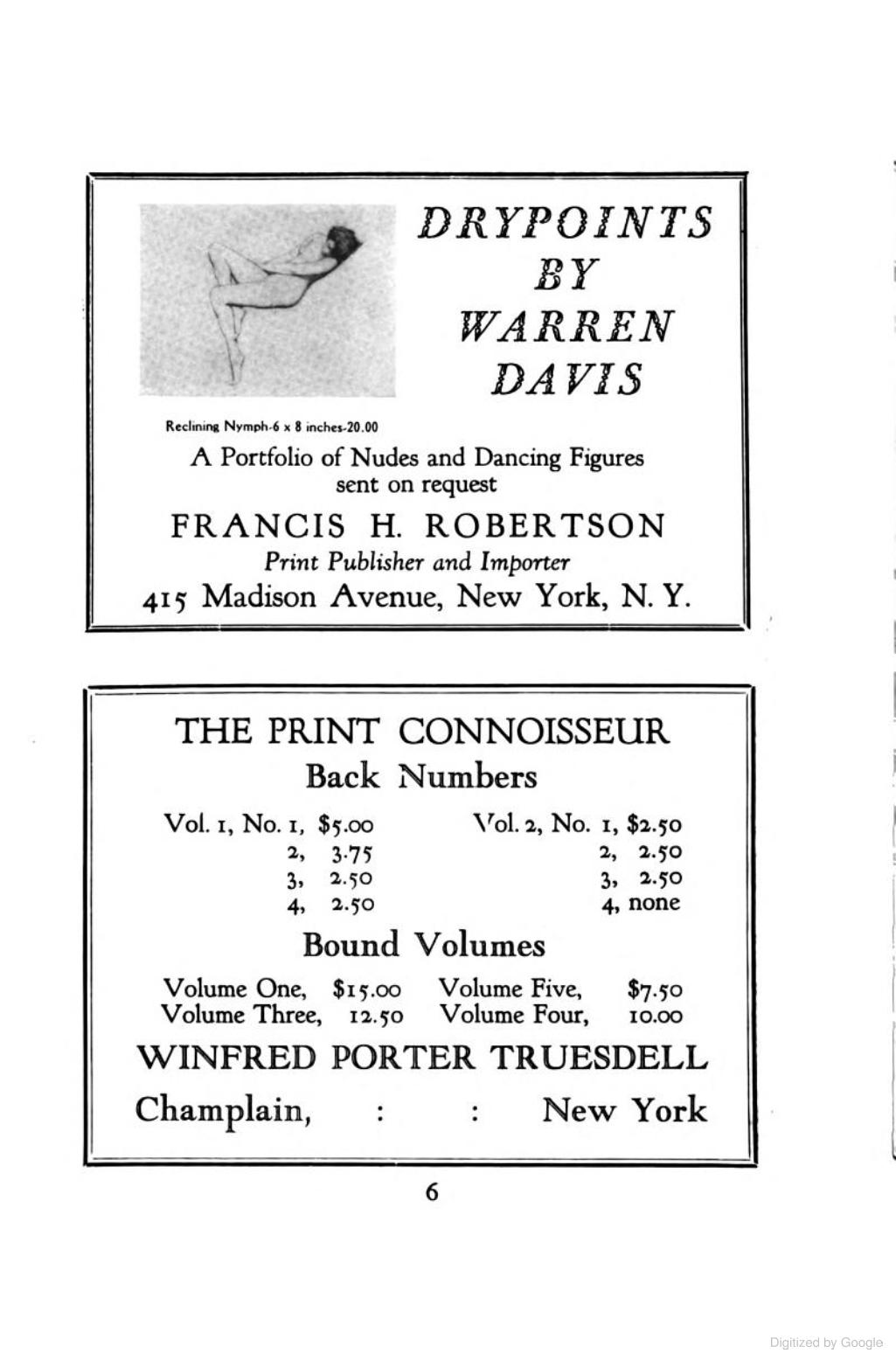
Advertisement for Warren Davis prints

Today, Davis is best known for his limited edition figure studies of idealized young women commissioned and published by Francis H. Robertson, a New York art dealer. This series, described as "A Portfolio of Nudes and Dancing Figures", was offered for sale in New York and London in an edition of 100 impressions. His treatment of his subjects considers how the human body composes itself while standing, sitting, kneeling, crouching, or lying down, unmediated by any historic, mythic, or philosophical associations based on classical references or culture.

== Influences ==
Davis' figurative work was influenced by a variety of factors, including the 19th century neo-Classicists such as Herbert James Draper (British, 1863–1920), John William Waterhouse (British, 1849–1917), and William-Adolphe Bouguereau (French, 1825–1905). Davis' work emphasized physical beauty and confidant femininity above all. Vanity Fair's Frank Crowninshield wrote in new magazine's first editorial in 1914:

"Let us instance one respect in which American life has recently undergone a great change. We allude to its increased devotion to pleasure, to happiness, to dancing, to sport, to the delights of the country, to laughter, and to all forms of cheerfulness. This tendency among us has been of late the subject of many parental warnings, admonitory sermons, and somewhat lugubrious editorials. For our part, it seems a bright sign in the heavens, for it argues, we believe, that we, as a nation, have come to realize the need for more cheerfulness, for hiding a solemn face, for a fair measure of pluck, and for great good humor."

== Recognition ==
Warren Davis was a member of the Salmagundi Club, the New York fine arts society, and his work is held in the permanent collections of the San Francisco Museum of Modern Art, Detroit Institute of Arts, Princeton University Art Museum, Zimmerli Art Museum at Rutgers University, Huntington Collection, Milwaukee Art Museum, and Metropolitan Museum of Art.
