= John Davis (footballer) =

English footballer (fl. 1920–1922)

Personal information
- Full name: John William Davis
- Position: Forward

Youth career
- Bredbury United

Senior career*
Years	Team	Apps	(Gls)
1920–1922	Port Vale	1	(0)
	Macclesfield	0	(0)
Total		1	(0)
- * Club domestic league appearances and goals

John William Davis was a footballer who played as a forward for Port Vale and Macclesfield in the 1920s.

== Career ==
Davis played for Bredbury United before joining Second Division side Port Vale as an amateur in January 1920. His single appearance came at inside-right in a goalless draw with Fulham at the Old Recreation Ground on 16 April 1921. He was released, probably in 1922, and moved on to Macclesfield.

== Career statistics ==
Appearances and goals by club, season and competition
Club	Season	League			FA Cup		Other		Total	
Club	Season	Division	Apps	Goals	Apps	Goals	Apps	Goals	Apps	Goals
Port Vale	1920–21	Second Division	1	0	0	0	0	0	1	0
