= John W. Davis (New Jersey politician) =

American politician

John W. Davis (July 30, 1918 – December 25, 2003) was an American Democratic Party politician who served as Speaker of the New Jersey General Assembly. Davis graduated from Bucknell University in 1941. He served in the U.S. Marines during World War II, and was elected to the Lower Penns Neck (now Pennsville Township) Board of Education. He was a farmer. Davis was elected to the New Jersey General Assembly in 1955, and was re-elected in 1957, 1959, 1961, 1963, and 1965. He was defeated for re-election to a seventh term in 1967. He was the Assembly Speaker in 1962.
