= John Emmeus Davis =

American scholar (born 1949)

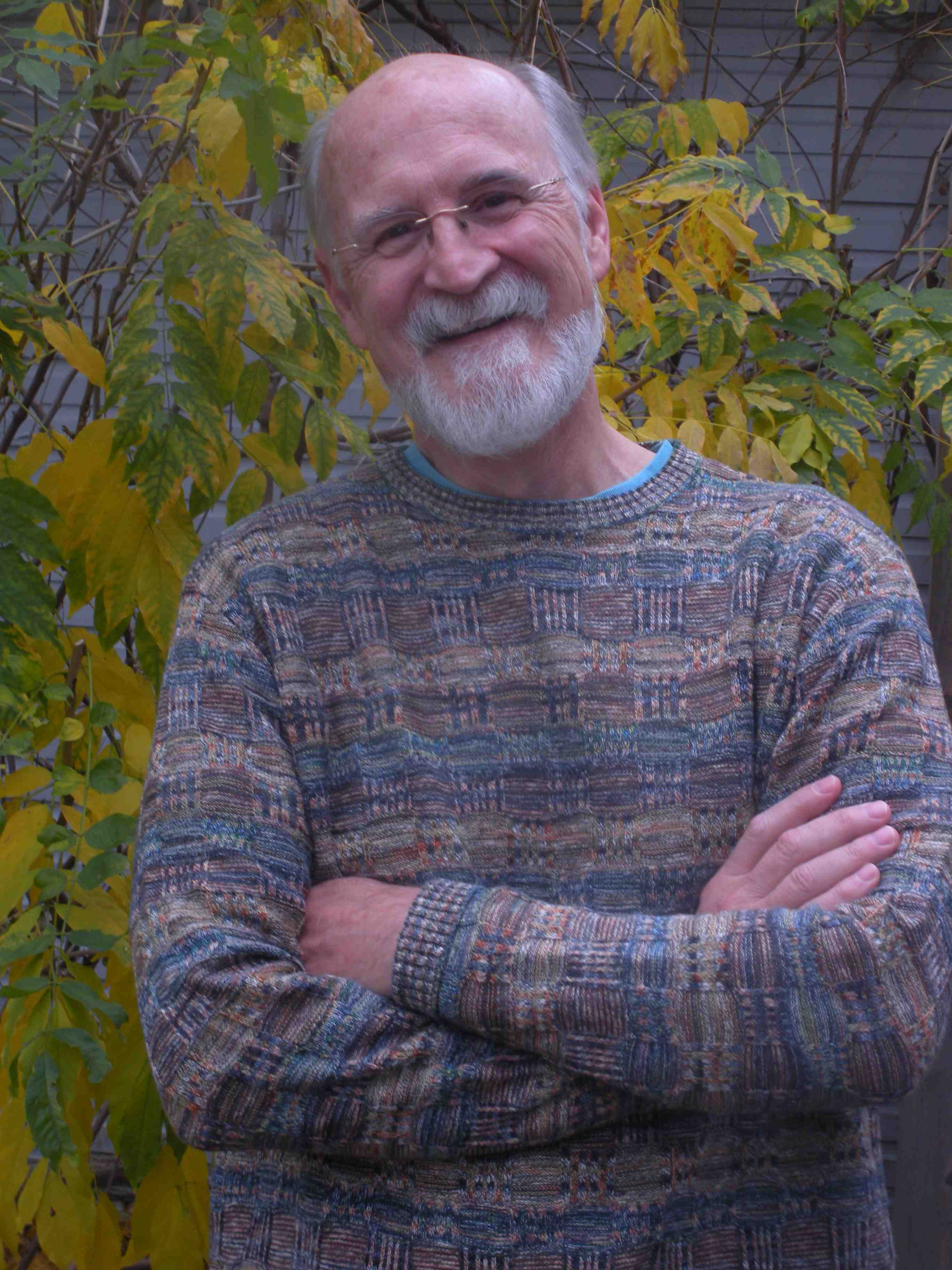
- Born: 1949 (age 75–76)
- Organization(s): Burlington Associates in Community Development LLC, International Center for Community Land Trusts

John Emmeus Davis (born 1949) is an American scholar and city planner who has worked on community land trusts. His professional practice has focused on assisting new community land trusts (CLTs), supporting the growth of older CLTs, and helping municipal agencies, Habitat for Humanity affiliates, and other nonprofit organizations to add permanently affordable housing to their program mix. In 2014, he and a colleague, Greg Rosenberg, established an online archive of historical materials named Roots & Branches: A Gardener’s Guide to the Origins and Evolution of the Community Land Trust.

Since 2017, he has been a member of the board of directors of the International Center for Community Land Trust.

== Education ==
Davis earned a B.A. in Philosophy from Vanderbilt University in 1971, and an M.S. in Developmental Sociology from Cornell University in 1981. He earned a Ph.D. in Community Development Planning and Community and Regional Sociology from Cornell University in 1986.

== Career ==
Davis was a co-founder of Burlington Associates in Community Development, LLC in Vermont in 1993, a national consulting cooperative that has provided assistance to a dozen cities and over 100 community land trusts in the United States and other countries. Davis has also worked with Habitat for Humanity, helping a number of affiliates to adopt forms of housing that remain permanently affordable. Habitat for Humanity International commissioned him to prepare its 2017 Shelter Report, a publication entitled Affordable for Good: Building Inclusive Communities through Homes that Last.

Davis has been a visiting fellow at the Lincoln Institute of Land Policy and a Senior Fellow at the National Housing Institute since 2010. He joined Greg Rosenberg and colleagues from six different countries in founding the International Center for Community Land Trusts in 2018. He has been the editor-in-chief of the Center's publishing division, Terra Nostra Press, since the imprint's founding in 2019.

== Academics ==
Davis has taught at Tufts University, the University of Vermont, Southern New Hampshire University and the Massachusetts Institute of Technology. He was a founding member of the faculty and board of the National Community Land Trust Academy (2006-2012), a program of the National Community Land Trust Network renamed Grounded Solutions Network after merging with the Cornerstone Partnership in 2016). He served for five years as the Academy's Dean.

In September 2012, the National CLT Network established the John Emmeus Davis Award for Scholarship. This awards recognizes individuals who have "contributed significant scholarship to advance the field of community land trusts, or who have been inspirational teachers, coaches or mentors."

== Major works ==
- Preserving Affordable Homeownership: Municipal Partnerships with Community Land Trusts, with Kristin King-Ries (Cambridge MA: Lincoln Institute of Land Policy, 2024).
- Affordable for Good: Building Inclusive Communities through Homes that Last (Atlanta GA: Habitat for Humanity International, 2017).
- “Common Ground: Community-Owned Land as a Platform for Equitable and Sustainable Development.” University of San Francisco Law Review 51 (1), 2017.
- Manuel d’antispeculation immobilière (Montreal, Quebec: Les Éditions Écosociété, 2014).
- “More Than Money: What Is Shared in Shared Equity Homeownership?” ABA Journal of Affordable Housing and Community Development Law 19 (3&4), 2010.
- The Community Land Trust Reader (Cambridge MA: Lincoln Institute of Land Policy, 2010).
- The City-CLT Partnership: Municipal Support for Community Land Trusts, with Rick Jacobus (Cambridge MA: Lincoln Institute, 2008).
- Shared Equity Homeownership: The Changing Landscape of Resale-Restricted Owner-Occupied Housing (Montclair NJ: National Housing Institute, 2006).
- “Between Devolution and the Deep Blue Sea: What’s a City or State To Do?” In A Right to Housing: Foundation of a New Social Agenda. Editors: Rachel Bratt, Chester Hartman & Michael Stone (Temple University Press, 2006).
- The Affordable City: Toward a Third Sector Housing Policy (Temple University Press, 1994).
- The Community Land Trust Handbook, with multiple authors, The Institute for Community Economics (Rodale Press, 1982).
