= Jack Davis (veteran) =

John Edward Davis (1 March 1895 – 20 July 2003) was one of the last surviving British veterans of the First World War and the last of Kitchener's Volunteers. He died aged 108, by which point he was the oldest living British veteran of the First World War.
