= J. Elwood Davis =

American football player and coach

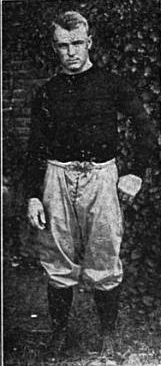

Biographical details
- Born: September 18, 1892; Correctionville, Iowa, U.S.
- Died: January 9, 1974 (aged 81); Iowa City, Iowa, U.S.

Playing career

Football
- 1915–1917: Iowa
- Position: Halfback

Coaching career (HC unless noted)

Football
- 1920: Kansas Wesleyan
- c. 1929: Washington University (backfield)
- c. 1937: Iowa (assistant)

Baseball
- 1943–1945: Iowa

Head coaching record
- Overall: 0–1–2 (college football); 15–15 (college baseball)

John Elwood "Waddy" Davis (September 18, 1892 – January 9, 1974) was an American college football player and coach of college football and college baseball.

== Playing career ==
Davis graduated from the University of Iowa in Iowa City. He played football for the Iowa Hawkeyes and was captain of the football team.

== Coaching career ==
=== High school coaching ===
Davis coached in the high school ranks in Iowa from 1917 to 1919.

=== Kansas Wesleyan ===
Davis was the eighth head football coach at Kansas Wesleyan University in Salina, Kansas, serving for one season, in 1920 and compiling a record of 0–1–2.

== Death ==
David died on January 9, 1974, at a hospital in Iowa City, Iowa.
