= John Edward Davis (Royal Navy officer) =

Royal navy officer

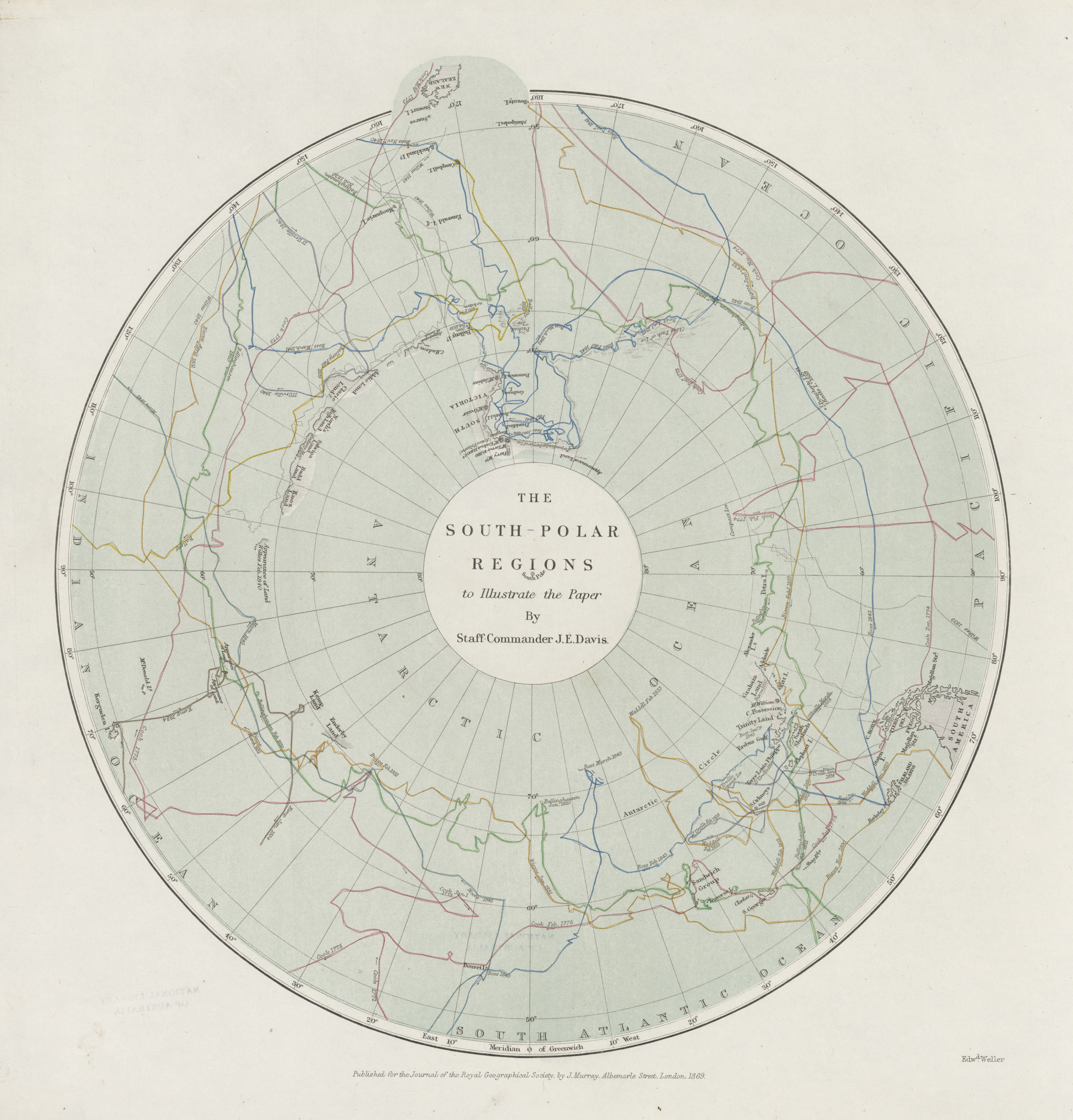
Chart of the south polar regions from Davis (1869)

John Edward Davis (1815-1877) was a Royal Navy officer, hydrographic surveyor and artist, noted for his illustrations of the Antarctic voyage of James Clark Ross (1839-1843) and for his expertise in deep-sea sounding.

Davis was born in 1815 and entered the Navy in July 1828. From 1831 to 1837 he served on HMS Samarang and HMS Blonde in South America, becoming master's assistant. He spent a period with HMS Beagle surveying parts of the coasts of Chile, Peru and Bolivia. From May 1837 he served on the North American and West India station, first as second master on HMS Cornwallis, then as acting master on HMS Comus.

In August 1839 Davis was appointed second master on HMS Terror under Captain Francis Crozier. In September Terror, along with HMS Erebus, sailed for the Antarctic on what would be a four year voyage of discovery led by James Clark Ross. The expedition discovered the Transantarctic Mountains and the volcanoes Erebus and Terror, named after the ships. Davis was responsible for surveying operations and preparing charts, and also made numerous illustrations of events on the voyage. On returning to England Davis was thanked by Francis Beaufort, Hydrographer and promoted to master

Engravings from paintings by Davis, published in Ross's account of the Antarctic voyage
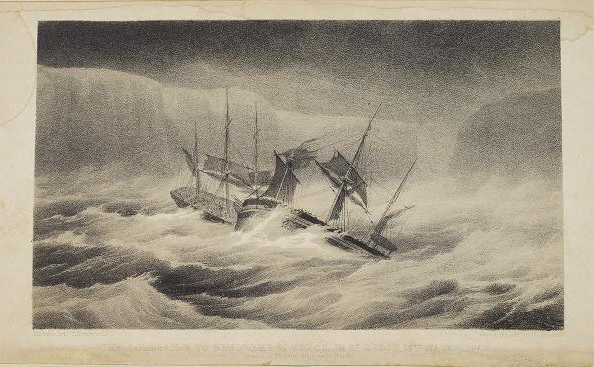
Collision of Erebus and Terror

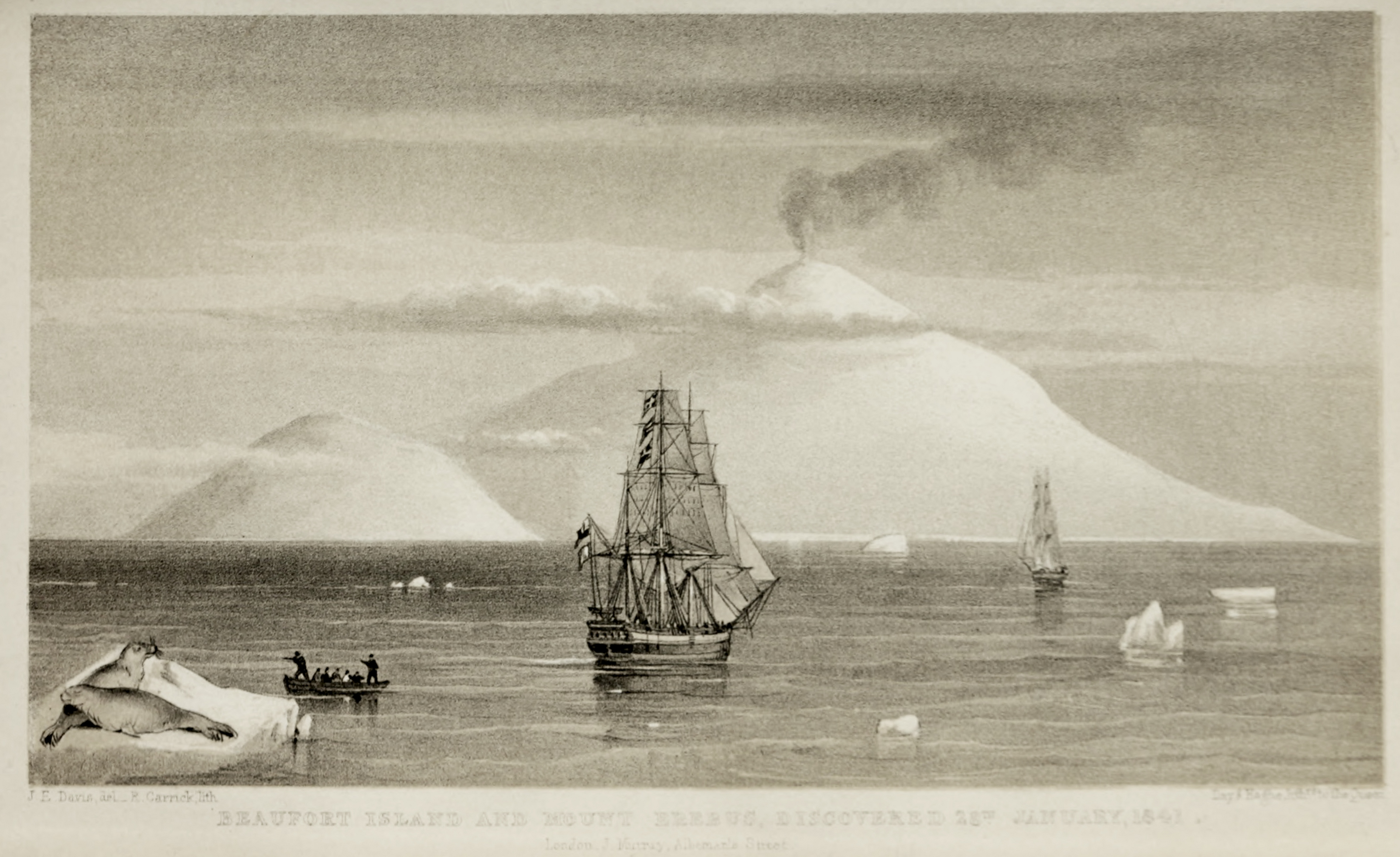
Beaufort Island and Mount Erebus

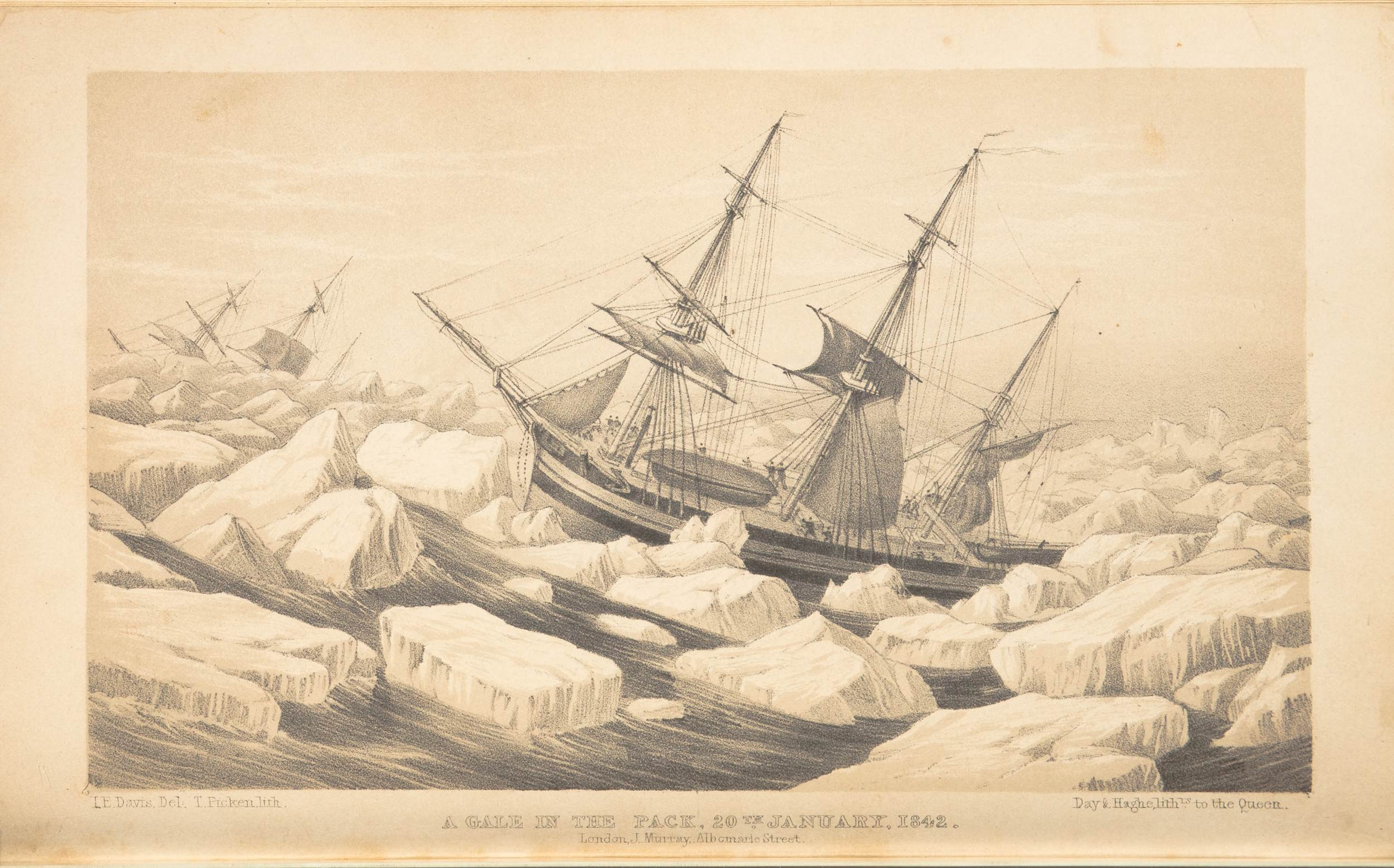
A Gale in the Pack

Chart of Sligo and Killala Bays, surveyed by Bedford in 1852-1854

From 1844 until 1862 Davis worked as a surveyor in home waters, first as assistant-surveyor to Captain G.A. Bedford on the west coast of Ireland, then on the south coast of England with Lieutenant H.L. Cox and then with Staff-Commander Usborne. In 1862 he sailed with HMS Porcupine on a deep-sea sounding cruise to the north-west of Ireland. This was successful in finding a suitable route for a transatlantic cable, avoiding the precipitous slopes that mark much of the edge of the continental shelf. Davis was commended in official reports for his contributions to this work. He then became a naval assistant to the Admiralty, responsible for supervision of deep-sea sounding equipment and for maintaining the catalogue of official documents. He published a number of works on the technical aspects of surveying and exploration, in particular on deep-sea temperature measurement. He was promoted Staff-Commander in 1863, and to Captain in 1870. He retired from the Hydrographic Office in 1877 and died later that year.

== Bibliography ==
- Davis, John Edward (1867). Notes on Deep-sea Sounding. Hydrographic Office of the Admiralty.
- —— (1869). "On Antarctic Discovery and Its Connection with the Transit of Venus in 1882". The Journal of the Royal Geographical Society of London. 39: 91–95. doi:10.2307/1798546. JSTOR 1798546.
- —— (1871). "On Deep-sea Thermometers". Proceedings of the Meteorological Society. 5: 305–342.
- ——; Davis, Percy L.H. (1887). Sun's true bearing or azimuth tables. London: J.D. Potter.
