= John E. Davis (architect) =

American football player and architect (1891–1961)

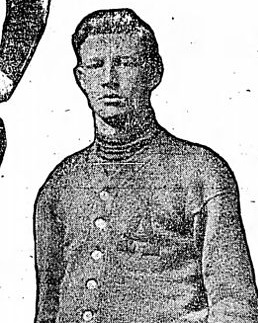
- Davis c. 1911
- Born: August 4, 1891; Oak Grove, Alabama, U.S.
- Died: January 2, 1961 (aged 69); Birmingham, Alabama, U.S.
- Occupation: architect
- Football career

Auburn Tigers
- Position: Fullback
- Class: Graduate

Personal information
- Listed weight: 168 lb (76 kg)

Career information
- College: Auburn (1907–1911)

Awards and highlights
- SIAA championship (1910); All-Southern (1911)

John Eayres Davis (August 4, 1891 – January 2, 1961) was a college football player and a notable architect in Birmingham, Alabama.

== Auburn University ==
Davis was a prominent fullback for the Auburn Tigers of Auburn University from 1907 to 1911. In 1915, John Heisman selected him for his list of the 30 greatest Southern football players.

=== 1910 ===
Davis was captain in 1910. Auburn was co-champion of the Southern Intercollegiate Athletic Association (SIAA).

=== 1911 ===
He was selected All-Southern in 1911.

== Architect ==
Davis was an architect of the firm of Warren, Knight & Davis in Birmingham. He had previously worked in Detroit.
