= Jon Davies =

American meteorologist

- Born: Jonathan M. Davies
- Education: University of Kansas (B.S., 1980)
- Known for: Tornado research
- Spouse: Shawna Davies
- Scientific career
- Fields: Meteorology
- Website: www.jondavies.net

Jonathan M. "Jon" Davies is an American meteorologist, storm chaser, and author. An operational meteorologist, Davies is a weather forecaster and is known for his mesoscale meteorology research related to tornadoes and convective storms. He is a major discoverer of the mini-supercell thunderstorm now often referred to as a low-topped supercell, pioneered significant research on tornado environments including on cold-core situations and the importance of low-level buoyancy in some deceptively low-CAPE tornado situations, and produced important case studies.

Growing up in Pratt, Kansas, Davies graduated with a degree in meteorology from the University of Kansas in 1980. He has worked for a number of private forecasting firms as well as a broadcast meteorologist for The Weather Channel and local television stations such as KSNW.

Davies wrote the children's book Storm Chasers! On the Trail of Twisters with Robert Rath in 2007. He has appeared on several television programs related to tornadoes and provided footage for many more.

A storm chaser since 1988, Davies also enjoys playing the piano.
