= Gerald Davis =

Gerald Davis may refer to:

- Gerald Davis (Irish artist) (1938–2005), Irish artist
- Gerald Davis (American artist) (born 1974), American artist
- Gerald Davis (philatelist) (1916–2005), British architect, graphic designer, postal historian and philatelist
- Gerald Davis (Canadian football) (born 1985), Canadian football offensive lineman
- Gerald Davis (politician) (born 1936), former American state senator
- Gerald Davis (photojournalist) (1940–1997), American photojournalist
- Gerald F. Davis (born 1961), American sociologist

== See also ==
- Gerry Davis (disambiguation)
- Gerald Davies (born 1945), Welsh rugby player
- Gerald Davies (cricketer) (born 1949), Australian cricketer
