= Raising the Flag at Ground Zero =

Photograph by Thomas E. Franklin

Raising the Flag at Ground Zero

Raising the Flag at Ground Zero is a photograph by Thomas E. Franklin of The Record newspaper of Bergen County, New Jersey, taken on September 11, 2001. The picture shows three New York City firefighters raising the U.S. flag at the World Trade Center, following the September 11 attacks. The official names for the photograph used by The Record are Firefighters Raising Flag and Firemen Raising the Flag at Ground Zero. The photo appeared on The Record front page on September 12, 2001. The paper also put it on the Associated Press wire and it appeared on the covers of several newspapers around the world. It has often been compared to the Raising the Flag on Iwo Jima photograph taken by Joe Rosenthal during World War II.

== Photograph ==
Franklin was with photographer James Nachtwey when he saw the firefighters. He shot the photograph shortly after 5 p.m. with a telephoto lens, standing under a pedestrian walkway across the West Side Highway that connected the center to the World Financial Center, located at the northwest corner of the World Trade Center site. Franklin said the firefighters were about 150 yards (140 m) away from him and the debris was 100 yards (91 m) beyond that. They were about 20 feet (6.1 m) off the ground. The firefighters pictured were Brooklyn-based firefighters George Johnson of Rockaway Beach, Dan McWilliams of Long Island (both from Ladder 157), and Billy Eisengrein of Staten Island (Rescue 2). Franklin had hitched a ride on a tugboat across the Hudson River, arriving around noon after the towers had collapsed.

== Flag ==
The flag came from the yacht Star of America, owned by Shirley Dreifus and her husband Spiros E. Kopelakis, which was docked in the yacht basin in the Hudson River at the World Financial Center. McWilliams cut the yardarm from the yacht with a K12 Saw and then took the flag and its pole from the yacht to an evacuation area on the northwest side of the site. They found a pole about 20 feet (6.1 m) off the ground jutting from a pile of debris thought to have been from the grounds of the Marriott World Trade Center hotel, situated adjacent to the towers.

Soon after its raising above Ground Zero, the flag disappeared. The city thought it had possession of the flag after the attack; Mayor Rudolph Giuliani and George Pataki signed it, and it flew at the New York City Hall, Yankee Stadium and on the USS Theodore Roosevelt (CVN-71) during its service in the Mideast.

However, when the flag's owner prepared to formally donate the flag, it was discovered that it was not the flag from Ground Zero. There was a size discrepancy: the yacht's flag measured 4 by 6 feet (1.2 m × 1.8 m), while the flag the city had measured 5 by 8 feet (1.5 m × 2.4 m). Dreifus started a website in an effort to get the flag back. A 2013 CNN documentary film, The Flag, directed by filmmakers Michael Tucker and Petra Epperlein, investigated the mystery of this missing 9/11 icon and discovered video evidence that the flag went missing hours after it was first raised.

The original flag was recovered as a result of a lead gathered following the airing of the History Channel's Brad Meltzer's Lost History in 2014. A number of scientists have now verified that the flag is authentic, and it was unveiled on Sunday, September 11, 2016, the 15th anniversary of 9/11, on a History Channel special on the flag, America's 9/11 Flag: Rise From the Ashes. Today, the flag is now inside the National September 11 Memorial & Museum.

== Later use ==
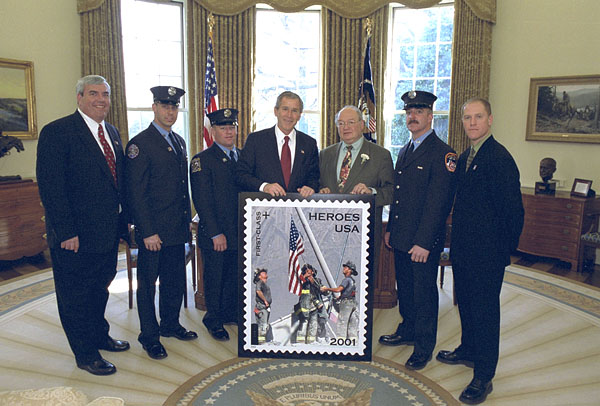
White House photo of March 11, 2002, unveiling of Heroes stamp. From left Postmaster General John E. Potter; Firefighters Billy Eisengrein and George Johnson; George W. Bush; U.S. Rep. Gary Ackerman, 5th District, N.Y. (who sponsored the stamp); Firefighter Dan McWilliams; and Record photographer Thomas E. Franklin, who took the photo featured on the stamp

Michael Kessel, a Manhattan attorney, suggested to U.S. Representative Gary Ackerman that the photo be used for a stamp, and the "Heroes 2001" stamp, USA Scott #B2, was unveiled on March 11, 2002, by President George W. Bush, in a ceremony attended by Franklin, Johnson, Eisengrein, and McWilliams. These stamps were semipostals: they had a purchase price (45¢) higher than their postage value (34¢), with the balance given to the Federal Emergency Management Agency's relief efforts. A special exception was thus made to the normal requirement by the United States Postal Service that subjects of stamps be deceased.

In December 2001, the New York City Fire Department unveiled plans for a statue based on the photograph to be placed at the Brooklyn headquarters. In an effort to be inclusive of all those who had been affected by the tragedy, the statue was to include black, white, and Hispanic firefighters. The change in ethnicity from the actual firefighters, all of whom are white, proved controversial enough that the statue was never built.

On November 5, 2007, a 40-foot-tall (12 m) bronze monument based on the photograph called To Lift A Nation and depicting three New York firefighters raising the flag over the ruins of the World Trade Center was dedicated at the National Fallen Firefighters Memorial Park in Emmitsburg, Maryland.

The flag itself, along with a copy of the photo inside the National September 11 Memorial & Museum.

== Other angles ==
Another picture of the same event was taken from a different angle by Lori Grinker, a photographer from the photo agency Contact Press Images.

A third picture was taken by Ricky Flores for The Journal News. Flores also was able to get near Ground Zero on the day of the attacks, and, at around the same time that Franklin took his shot, Flores was able to get into a second story of a nearby building and capture the same scene from a different angle.

== See also ==
- List of photographs considered the most important
