= Gerald Davis (photojournalist) =

American photojournalist

Gerald Davis (1940-1997) was an American photojournalist.

Born in Brooklyn, Davis grew up in the Bronx. As a student at Baruch College, he began to learn about photography through visits to the Museum of Modern Art and part-time work at the New York Times photo library. He eventually assisted New York Times’ photographers Sam Falk and Jack Manning, and he studied with Lisette Model at the New School for Social Research.

From 1964 to 1967, he was a photographer/editor for United Press International in their New York Bureau covering everything from opera to transit union strikes. When Brazilian magazine Manchete opened a New York City bureau in 1968, he became a staff photographer and eventually photo editor for it and several of its sister publications which focused on nature, travel, fashion and celebrity news. In 1978 he became the photo editor for the National Enquirer.

In 1976, he became the first managing director of Contact Press Images.

Davis moved to West Palm Beach, Florida, with his family in 1978, working first as a photo editor for The National Enquirer and after two years, as a freelance photographer for several British, European, and U.S. publications.

In 2014, a monograph of his photographs was collected in Strange Stories: The Photography of Gerald Davis, edited by Todd Oldham and published by Ammo Books.
