= Gerry Davis =

Gerry Davis may refer to:

- Gerry Davis (umpire) (born 1953), Major League baseball umpire
- Gerry Davis (outfielder) (born 1958), Major League baseball outfielder
- Gerry Davis (screenwriter) (1930–1991), British writer for television and film

== See also ==
- Gerald Davis (disambiguation)
- Jerome Davis (disambiguation)
- Jerry Davis (disambiguation)
- Gerard Davis (born 1977), footballer
- Jeremiah Davis (1826–1910), American politician
- Jeremy Davis (born 1985), musician
