= The Record (North Jersey) =

Newspaper in New Jersey

Coordinates: 40.904551°N 74.189058°W

- The August 1, 2016, front page of The Record
- Type: Daily newspaper
- Format: Broadsheet
- Owner: USA Today Co.
- Editor: Daniel Sforza
- Founded: June 5, 1895
- Language: American English
- Headquarters: 1 Garret Mountain Plaza, Woodland Park, New Jersey 07424
- Country: United States
- Circulation: 14,196 (as of 2024)
- Price: $1 daily or $2 Sundays/Thanksgiving Day.
- OCLC number: 10806291
- Website: northjersey.com

The Record (also called The North Jersey Record, The Bergen Record and formerly The Bergen Evening Record) is a newspaper in New Jersey, United States. Serving Bergen, Essex, Hudson and Passaic counties in North Jersey, it has the second-largest circulation of the state's daily newspapers, behind The Star-Ledger.

The Record was under the ownership of the Borg family from 1930 to 2016, and the family went on to form North Jersey Media Group, which eventually bought its competitor, the Herald News. Both papers are now owned by Gannett Company, which purchased the Borgs' media assets in July 2016.

For years, The Record had its primary offices in Hackensack with a bureau in Wayne. Following the purchase of the competing Herald News of Passaic, both papers began centralizing operations in what is now Woodland Park, where The Record is currently based.

== History ==
The newspaper was first published as The Evening Record, on June 5, 1895, by Evan G. Runner. Based on Main Street in Hackensack, Runner had two investors initially, Frank Cook and George Alden, and went through many others until 1920. At that time, a group of eight investors bought the company, which had changed its name to The Evening Record and Bergen County Herald.

Two of the 1920 investors were Matt C. Ely and John Borg. Ely and Borg bought out the other investors, and partnered as publisher and editor for a number of years. The name was simplified in 1922 to The Bergen Evening Record. When Ely became ill in 1929, Borg bought out his interest as well. Other sources have Borg, a Wall Street financier who gave up his previous business upon getting into news, buying Ely out in 1930.

=== Second generation ===
John Borg retired in 1949, but his son Donald had been involved in the newspaper for many years, and took over his role.

In 1951, the paper moved from Main Street to an expanded office on River Street.

From 1952 to 1963 the circulation of The Record doubled and its coverage changed from local to regional. It was one of the papers whose editorial position was in favor of the Metropolitan Regional Council (MRC) In 1960, the newspaper changed its name to simply The Record, and expanded coverage beyond the county, including the opening of a Trenton bureau. The company name remained The Bergen Evening Record Corporation.

=== Third generation ===
In 1964, The Record bought the struggling Paterson Call and renamed it The Morning Call. Donald Borg's sons, Malcolm and Gregory, with experience at The Record, were made assistant publishers at the Passaic County paper. It was a publishing success, but continued to be a financial failure. The Borgs sold it in 1969. They opened a news bureau in Passaic County about a decade later.

1971 was a critical year for The Record. Malcolm took over business management of the company, and Gregory became chairman and the paper's editor. That year William Caldwell, long-time editorialist, received a Pulitzer Prize. Also, the company entered the television business, buying a four-station company named Gateway Communications.

1973 was also a key year in the growth of the organization, as the company acquired other newspapers from The Reporter Newspapers of Toms River and bought Freehold News Transcript. A holding company for the acquired papers, Toms River Publishing Company, was established. The company also established a bureau in Washington, DC.

In 1974, writers in the area voted The Record first in the categories of writing, editing and local coverage. It provided different local news coverage for various areas in its distribution range.

Donald Borg retired in 1975.

In 1982, the company reorganized with a parent company Macromedia, Inc., and two subsidiaries — Bergen Record Corporation for print media, and Gateway Communications Incorporated for broadcast. In 1983 the paper had a daily circulation of just over 149,000 with its readership described as "upscale".

On September 12, 1988, its afternoon publication and delivery changed to early morning. When combined with more centralized distribution requiring carriers to have automobiles, many paperboys were put out of work.

Recession hit in 1989, just as the company amassed a large debt to build a new plant. Cost-cutting measures included layoffs, early retirement packages, furloughs, and other actions. The paper recovered to prosperity by 1993.

=== Fourth generation ===
Jennifer Borg joined the company in 1995. She is Malcolm's daughter. In 2001, the company flattened its structure, retaining only the Macromedia corporate entity, but renamed to North Jersey Media Group.

In 1996, the paper won the coveted Gerald Loeb Award for its series "Formula for Disaster: The Lodi Explosion" by Michael Moore, Bruce Locklin and Debra Lynn Vial. The series was the catalyst for the creation of the U.S. Chemical Safety and Hazard Investigation Board.

In 2011, the paper's headquarters were moved to Woodland Park, the offices of sister paper Herald News, which is published as a Passaic County edition of The Record. Gannett bought the company from the Borgs in 2016. The two papers had already begun integrating their operations before the Gannett takeover, and today the only substantive difference between the two is the mastheads.

As of 2018, Daniel Sforza is the executive editor.

== Format and style ==
The paper's approach to coverage has been described as "read[ing] like a magazine". Rather than a focus on breaking news on its front page, it features "The Patch," a thematic topic or investigative report.

== Iconic September 11 photograph at World Trade Center ==
Following the September 11 attacks on the World Trade Center in New York City, a photographer for The Record, Thomas E. Franklin, took a photograph of three firefighters raising an American flag over the rubble of what had been the World Trade Center. This became an iconic photo known as Raising the Flag at Ground Zero. A follow-up story by Jeannine Clegg, a reporter for The Record, about the flag raising efforts by the firemen that led to the photo appeared in the newspaper on September 14, 2011. The Record owns the rights to the photograph, but has licensed it in exchange for donations to September 11 causes, as long as the photo is used in a "dignified and proper manner" for non-commercial purposes.

== See also ==
- Mike Kelly, columnist since 1981
- Robert Leckie (1920–2001), rejoined The Record after returning from World War II.
- John R. MacArthur (former reporter)
- John Tierney (former reporter)
