= Contact Press Images =

International photojournalism agency

Contact Press Images is an international and independent photojournalism agency founded in 1976 in New York City by French-British journalist and editor Robert Pledge and American photojournalist David Burnett. The agency's operations have been directed by picture editor Jeffrey D. Smith since 1986.

Annie Leibovitz joined Contact Press in 1977. In 1990, the agency opened its European office in Paris under the supervision of Dominique Deschavanne, a French journalist and picture editor.

In addition to producing monographs and exhibitions, some of Contact's photographers have been awarded prizes in photojournalism, including honors from the World Press Photo, National Press Photographers Association, and Overseas Press Club of America.

The agency is focused on human rights issues such as wars and conflicts, the HIV/AIDS epidemic, religion and ethnicity, and environmental issues.

== Books by Contact Press Images ==
- Kalachnikov: L'AK47 à la conquete du monde, by Contact Press Images, Stanislas De Haldat, Based on Photos by Contact Photojournalist J.B. Diederich, The first Westerner to visit Kalachnikov at home in Illevsk, Sirene (1993).
- Le cercle des intimes: François Mitterrand par ses proches, by Caroline Lang, Robert Pledge, Michel Baverey, La Sirene (1995), ISBN 2-84045-133-6
- Eleven: Witnessing the World Trade Center, 1974 - 2001, by Contact Press Images, Robert Pledge (editor), Universe (2002), ISBN 0-7893-0830-4
- Pope John Paul II: His Remarkable Journey, by Contact Press Images, Robert Pledge (editor), de.MO (2005), ISBN 0-9742836-3-0
- 44 Days: Iran and the Remaking of the World, by Contact Press Images, David Burnett (photographer) and Robert Pledge (editor), National Geographic (2009), ISBN 978-1426205132
- Bob Marley (One on One), by Contact Press Images, David Burnett, Insight (2012), ISBN 978-1608870660

== Selected monographs by Contact Press Images photographers ==
- Too Much Time: Women in Prison, by Jane Evelyn Atwood, Phaidon (2000), ISBN 0-7148-3973-6
- Do or Die, by Martine Barrat, Viking Adult (1993), ISBN 0-670-84325-3
- The British, by Nick Danziger, Harper Collins UK (2002), ISBN 0-00-257160-9
- Fight, by Stephen Dupont, Braus (2003), ISBN 3-89904-061-9
- Des Hommes, by Giorgia Fiorio, Marval (2003), ISBN 2-86234-341-2
- Afterwar: Veterans from a World in Conflict, by Lori Grinker, de.MO (2005), ISBN 0-9705768-7-0
- Tango: Never Before Midnight, by Adriana Groisman, Lariviere (2004), ISBN 978-987-9395-20-2
- Just Another War, by Kenneth Jarecke, Exene Cervenka, Zezene Cervenka, Bedrock (1995), ISBN 0-9634784-1-9
- A Photographer's Life: 1990-2005, by Annie Leibovitz, Random House (2003), ISBN 0-375-50509-1
- Red-Color News Soldier, by Li Zhensheng, Phaidon (2003), ISBN 0-7148-4308-3
- Don McCullin in Africa, by Don McCullin, Random House UK (2005), ISBN 0-224-07514-4
- Sebastiao Salgado: Migrations, by Sebastiao Salgado, Aperture (2005), ISBN 0-89381-891-7
- Elvis at 21: New York to Memphis, by Alfred Wertheimer, Insight (2006), ISBN 1-933784-01-6
- Windows of the Soul: My Journeys in the Muslim World, text and photographs by Alexandra Avakian, National Geographic Books (2008)
- Mike Tyson, photographs and essay by Lori Grinker, powerHouse Books, (2022), ISBN 9781576877760
