= David Burnett (photojournalist) =

American photojournalist

External images
- One of Burnett's photos of Phan Thi Kim Phúc, burned by napalm at Trảng Bàng in 1972.
- Burnett's photo of another child injured at Trảng Bàng.

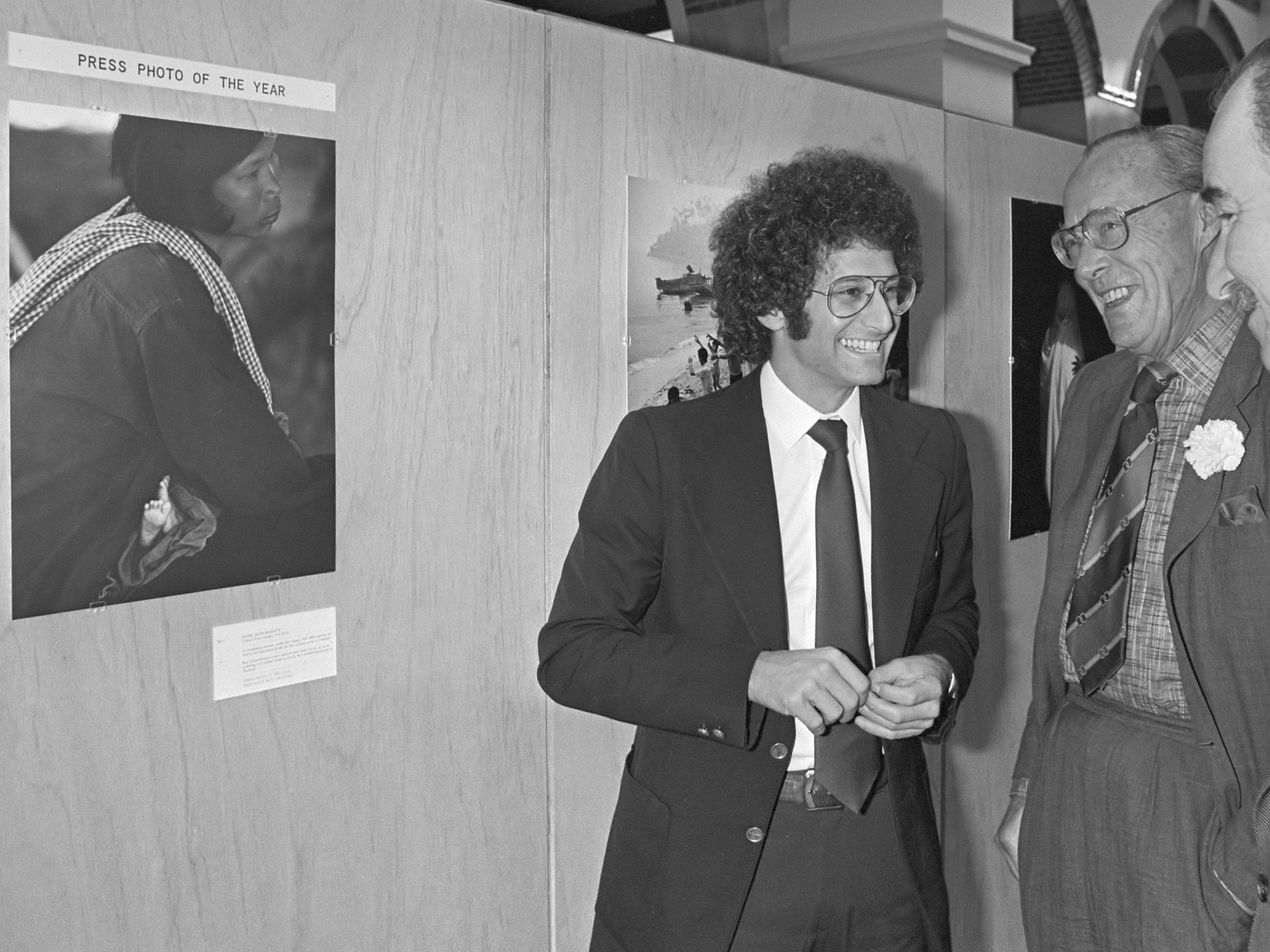
Burnett won the 1980 World Press Photo award with a photo of a Cambodian woman holding her child in her arms waiting for food to be distributed at a refugee camp (1980)

One of Burnett's historical photos: Ruhollah Khomeini comes to Iran.

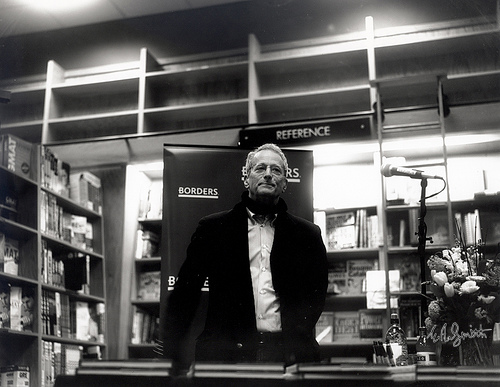
Burnett at the book signing for "Soul Rebel".

David Burnett (born 1946) is an American magazine photojournalist based in Washington, D.C. His work from the 1979 Iranian revolution was published extensively in Time (including its "Man of the Year" portrait of the Ayatollah Khomeini).

He has won dozens of top awards for his work, including the 1973 Robert Capa Gold Medal (with Raymond Depardon and Chas Gerretsen) from the Overseas Press Club for work in Chile, the 1980 Magazine Photographer of the Year from the National Press Photographers Association, and the 1980 World Press Photo of the Year.

He was a member of the Gamma photo agency and co-founded Contact Press Images.

== Early life and formative years ==
David Burnett was born in 1946, in Holladay, Utah. His parents are Mr. and Mrs. Ted Burnett. He attended Oakwood School, Olympus Junior High, and Olympus high school. During a summer job at optical store in Salt Lake City he developed an interest for lenses, and his first published photos were in the yearbook of his high school. Burnett said that he knew he wanted to be a photographer from the experience working on the yearbook and that within a year or two he became a stringer for a local weekly and occasionally sold pictures of Friday night basketball to The Salt Lake Tribune.

== Career ==
In 1968, after his graduation from the Colorado College, Burnett began working as a freelance photographer for Time and Life, first in the United States and later in Vietnam.

On June 8, 1972. Burnett was one of the photojournalists present at Trảng Bàng in Tây Ninh Province when Nick Ut of the Associated Press captured his famous image of the nine-year-old Vietnamese girl Phan Thị Kim Phúc and some other children fleeing a napalm attack. Two South Vietnamese Skyraider aircraft went off course and dropped the incendiary bombs near the journalists, resulting in the deaths of two children and inflicting serious burns on others, including Kim Phúc. Burnett also photographed the scene.

After two years in Vietnam, he joined the French photo agency Gamma, traveling the world for its news department for two years.

In 1975, he co-founded a new photo agency, Contact Press Images, in New York City. For the last three decades he has traveled extensively, working for most of the major magazines in the United States and Europe.

In 2004, Burnett also used his Speed Graphic with a 178mm f/2.5 Aero-Ektar lens removed from a K-24 aerial camera to cover the Presidential campaign of John Kerry. His work covering the 2004 Olympics with an array of antiquated cameras and films received positive reviews in the photography press and in The New York Times.

In 2009, National Geographic published Burnett's 44 Days: Iran and the Remaking of the World. The books contains his photography taken in Iran during the 1979 overthrow of Shah Mohammad Reza Pahlavi.

Also that year, Burnett published another book of intimate, unpublished images he took of reggae singer Bob Marley, titled Soul Rebel.

In 2019, the fiftieth anniversary of the launch of Apollo 11, the first human mission to the Moon, he published We Choose to Go to the Moon, a book of photos taken around the launch pad in Cape Canaveral.

In October 2022, The Outsiders House Museum and its executive director Danny Boy O'Connor published the book The Outsiders ‘Rare and Unseen’, which contains 148 photos by Burnett who was the on-set photographer of the film The Outsiders (1983). O'Connor said: “We originally got the first lot of photos and then [Burnett] said there may be more. They found the rougher photos, and for me, that’s where the rubber meets the road because they’re unpolished, their guard’s down, they’re not posing".

== Partial bibliography ==
2009 - 44 Days: Iran and the Remaking of the World

2009 - Soul Rebel

2019 - We Choose to Go to the Moon

2022 - The Outsiders ‘Rare and Unseen’ - with Danny Boy O'Connor

== Accolades ==
1973 - Robert Capa Gold Medal - with Raymond Depardon and Chas Gerretsen

1980 - Magazine Photographer of the Year - National Press Photographers Association

1980 - World Press Photo of the Year
