= Thomas E. Franklin =

American photographer (born 1966)

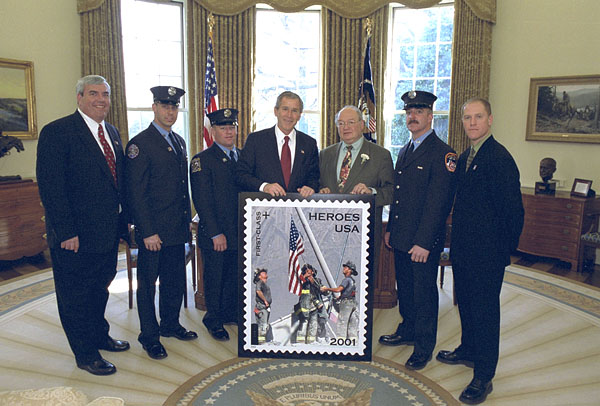
- Franklin (far right) with a ceremonial stamp of his 9/11 photograph
- Born: 1966 (age 59–60)
- Education: State University of New York at Purchase (BFA)
- Known for: Photography

Thomas E. Franklin (born 1966) is an American photographer for The Bergen Record, best known for his photograph Raising the Flag at Ground Zero, which depicts firefighters raising the American flag at the World Trade Center after the September 11 attacks.

== Biography ==
Franklin is a 1988 graduate of the State University of New York at Purchase. He has been with The Record since 1993, and has been a professional photojournalist and documentary photographer for over 20 years. He has won numerous awards for his photography, and his work has been widely published and exhibited.

In 2005, his documentary film Ford's Toxic Legacy won the New Jersey Film Festival's Best Jersey Film award and the New Jersey Press Photographers Association's New Jersey Understanding award. Based on The Record's award-winning Toxic Legacy series, which exposed toxic dumping by the Ford Motor Company and its impact on the Ramapough Indians and the environment, Franklin was part of a team of reporters who received the 2005 IRE Medal—the top national investigative award—the 2006 Grantham Prize for Environmental Journalism, and the 2005 Sigma Delta Chi Award, for Toxic Legacy.

Franklin has appeared on radio and television to discuss his photography, including The Today Show, Good Morning America, CNN, and Oprah. He has been a guest lecturer at major colleges and universities and remains a public speaker in his local community, where he speaks to civics groups, schools, corporations, and local organizations sharing his unique experiences of 9/11 and his career.

He produced a weekly photo-column in The Record called 'Picture This', featuring colorful aspects of life in North Jersey. In 2007, Picture This, received an Award of Excellence from POYi (Pictures of the Year International) and a First Place award in Feature Photography from the New Jersey chapter of Society of Professional Journalists (NJ-SPJ).

Franklin is an associate professor in the School of Communication and Media at Montclair State University.

== 9/11 photos ==
Franklin rose to national acclaim for his coverage of the 9/11 terrorist attacks on New York. His now iconic image of three firemen raising a flag above the rubble of the World Trade Center, taken hours after the attacks, is one of the most identifiable and powerful images in history. Life Magazine listed it as one of the "100 Photographs That Changed the World," and the photo is part of the permanent collection of the Library of Congress.

A Pulitzer Prize finalist in 2002 for his photographs from 9/11, Franklin has received dozens of national awards from MSNBC, Society of Professional Journalists, Editor & Publisher, the Deadline Club, and National Headliners, among others.

=== Flag-raising photo ===
The flag-raising photo was made shortly after 5 p.m. on September 11, 2001. He was standing under a pedestrian walkway across the West Side Highway, which connected the World Trade Center to the World Financial Center at the northwest corner. Franklin said the firefighters were about 150 feet away from him and about 20 feet (6 m) off the ground, while the debris was about 90 feet beyond that.

In 2002, the United States Postal Service introduced the "Heroes" stamp, featuring the flag-raising photo. Proceeds from the stamp have raised over ten million dollars to help families and rescue workers of 9/11.

Also in 2002, an autographed original print signed by Franklin and the three firemen pictured in the photo sold for $89,625 at Christie's Auction House, with proceeds benefiting two 9/11 charities. The photo has also been instrumental in raising money for other charitable causes, including juvenile diabetes, autism, and cerebral palsy.
