= Li Zhensheng (photojournalist) =

Chinese photographer (1940–2020)

Li Zhensheng 李振盛
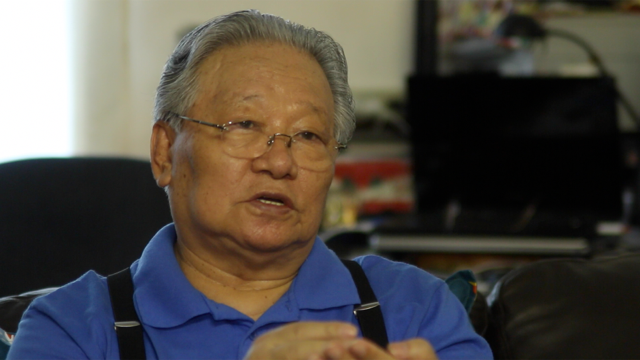
- Li Zhensheng
- Born: September 22, 1940; Dalian
- Died: June 2020 (aged 79–80); New York
- Website: lizhensheng.blshe.com(Chinese) (Archive) www.red-colornewssoldier.com (English)

Li Zhensheng (Chinese: 李振盛; pinyin: Lǐ Zhènshèng; 22 September 1940 – June 2020) was a Chinese photojournalist who captured important images from the Cultural Revolution.

His employment at the Heilongjiang Daily, which followed the party line, and his decision to wear a red arm band indicating an alliance with Chairman Mao Zedong, allowed him access to scenes otherwise only described in written and verbal accounts.

His 2003 book Red-Color News Soldier exhibits both the revolutionary ideals and many of the atrocities that occurred during the Cultural Revolution. The Heilongjiang Daily newspaper had a strict policy in accordance with a government dictate that only "positive" images could be published, which consisted mostly of smiling revolutionaries offering praise for Chairman Mao. The "negative" images, which depicted the atrocities of the time, were hidden beneath a floorboard in his house before he brought them to light at a photo exhibition in 1988.

A private museum, dedicated to Li's life and work, was opened in 2017 in Sichuan Province as a part of the Jianchuan Museum Cluster.

== Early life ==
Li was born to a poor family in Dalian, Liaoning. At the time of his birth the city was located in Kwantung Leased Territory, where Japan maintained the puppet regime, Manchukuo. His mother died when he was three, and his older brother, who was a member of the People's Liberation Army was killed during the Chinese Civil War. Li helped his father, who was a cook on a steamship and later as a farmer, until Li was 10 years old. Li rose to the top of his class despite starting school late. In middle school, Li traded his very own prized stamp collection for a film camera. He later earned a spot at the Changchun Film School, where he acquired much of his photographic knowledge. In 1963, he briefly held a job at the Heilongjiang Daily, but the Socialist Education Movement intervened. Li married a newspaper editor, Zu Yingxia, in 1968. Following their marriage, Li was accused of being a "new bourgeois". This led to Li being criticized in front of nearly 300 employees, and then demoted from his position. Li ended up back in the countryside for nearly two years, living with peasants and studying the works of Chairman Mao.

== Cultural Revolution ==
Li returned to Harbin just months before the outbreak of the Cultural Revolution in the spring of 1966. A lack of photographic film, marauding Red Guards, and a political prohibition against photographing negative aspects of the revolution restricted what he was able to portray. He soon realized that only people wearing the red-colored arm band of the Red Guards could photograph without harassment. To achieve this, he founded his own small rebel group at the newspaper.

Li then photographed horrific acts. His collection includes photos depicting the dehumanizing tactics used by the Red Guards to humiliate or degrade alleged counter-revolutionaries. Some images depict public displays of "denunciations," where the hair of prominent individuals is shaved. Other images show people bearing "dunce" hats; people with black paint spread over their faces; others wearing signs around their necks with writing that criticizes their profession or names. Li also captured scenes of public executions of counter-revolutionaries who were never given a trial for their alleged crimes.

In September 1969, at the height of the Cultural Revolution, Li was once more sent back to the countryside. He was sent to the May 7th Cadre School in Liuhe, a labor camp where he and his wife, Zu Yingxia, spent two years performing hard labor.

Across several years of photographing, Li amassed nearly 100,00 photos during the Cultural Revolution; capturing both the newspaper worthy moments of revolution and the gruesome realities of resistance. Li had taken meticulous care of the "negative" images he captured while at the newspaper, hiding them beneath a floorboard of his one-room apartment. The dry atmosphere and mild temperatures of Harbin aided in the preservation of the photographic negatives. While he was sent away, Li entrusted a friend to care for the apartment, and instructed him to never reveal the secrets it contained. Li returned to the newspaper in 1972 as the head of the photography department, and later became a professor at Peking University in 1982.

== Red-Color News Soldier ==
Li's book, Red-Color News Soldier, was published in 2003. The title is a literal translation of the Chinese characters written on the armband he wore during the Chinese Cultural Revolution. Although he says he never gave his alliance to Chairman Mao, wearing the arm band gave him unprecedented access to historic events, which have since shaped Chinese culture. The book covers the period from just before the Cultural Revolution in 1965 to just after in 1976. It is separated into five chronological sections: 1964–1966 titled "It is right to rebel"; 1966 titled "Bombard the Headquarters"; 1966–1968 titled "The Red Sun in our hearts"; 1968–1972 titled "Revolution is not a dinner party"; and 1972–1974 titled "Die Fighting."

China analyst John Gittings welcomed Li's book in his review, noting Li was a Red Guard as well as a photographer and did not deny that he also led "struggle sessions" against innocent victims. Gittings writes that Li's photos reflect a desire to record and understand, and that it was "unique" for a simple reason: "Although the post-Mao Chinese government has labelled the cultural revolution '10 years of chaos,' it still tries to suppress any real inquiry into the countless human tragedies it caused..."

The book, which has not appeared in China, took many years to publish. Li's "negative" pictures (those that depicted the atrocities of the cultural revolution) were first revealed publicly in March 1988 at a Chinese Press Association's photography competition in Beijing. The show, entitled Let History Tell the Future consisted of twenty images from his collection, which were deemed "counterrevolutionary." In December of that year, Li met Robert Pledge, a French-British photography editor who was director of Contact Press Images, an international photo agency based in New York City, who had come to Beijing. They agreed to work together on a book of Li's photos, but to wait until the political climate was right. Seven months later, in June 1989, the events of Tiananmen Square made worldwide headlines, and Li became determined to produce a book to show the world the images from the Cultural Revolution. Work on the book began in 1999. Since Pledge did not speak Chinese, and Li did not speak English, the two had to coordinate work through the use of translators—many of whom became integral parts of their relationship. Li sent over 30,000 brown envelopes to Pledge's office in New York City, each containing photographic negatives.

A number of the images are self-portraits. This was the result of always returning to the paper with one extra frame on the film roll, a way of always being prepared to cover a breaking news event at the last minute. Li would "burn off" the last image with a photo of himself shortly before developing the film. Often the poses were humorous and playful. One such image of Li exposing his bare chest was published in the book. He said he was attempting to recreate the old expression of "baring one's chest in the face of adversity," or in his case, the violence of the cultural revolution.

During book tours Li made a point to speak of his love for China. He said while he disagrees with the government, he still loved his country and hoped democracy would perhaps prevail in the long-term future. He did not believe his images or the book should be considered anti-Chinese, rather a reminder of the painful past many countries endure during their evolution.

== Death ==
Li died in June 2020.
