= Jerome Davis =

Jerome Davis may refer to:

- Jerome Davis (sociologist) (1891–1979), American sociologist and activist
- Jerome C. Davis (1822–1881), farmer who gave the name to the city of Davis, California
- Jerry Davis (American football) (1924–2006), American football player
- Jerome Davis (nose tackle) (born 1962), American football player
- Jerome Davis (bull rider) (born 1972), American bull rider
- Jerome Davis (offensive tackle) (born 1974), CFL and NFL football player
- Jerome Davis (sprinter) (born 1977), American former sprinter

== See also ==
- Gerry Davis (disambiguation)
- Jerry Davis (disambiguation)
