= Jianchuan Museum Cluster =

Group of museums in Sichuan, China

- 建川博物馆聚落
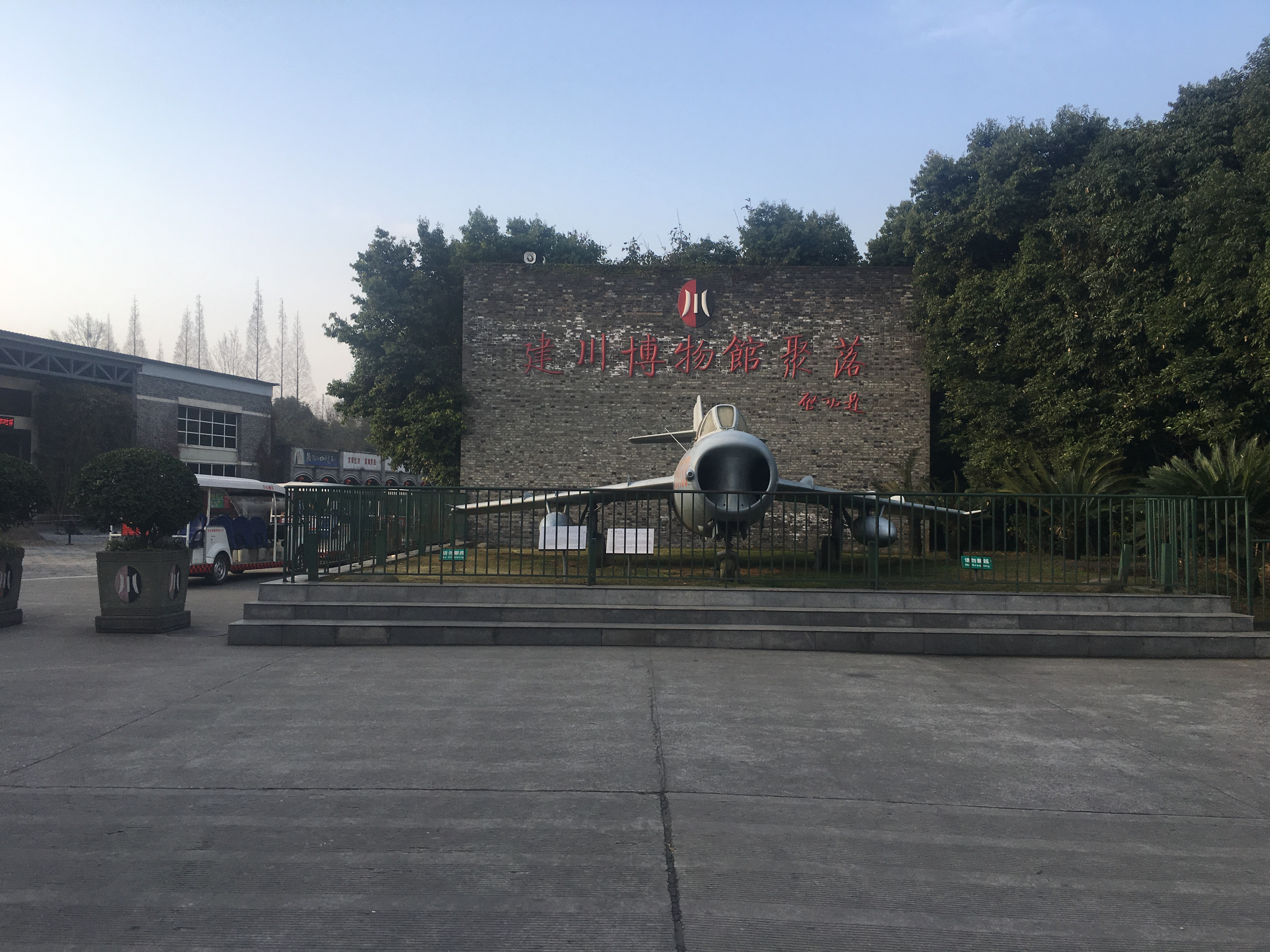
- 1955 Shenyang JJ-5 and the Entrance of Jianchuan Museum Cluster
- Location: Anren, Dayi County, Chengdu, Sichuan
- Coordinates: 30.5032°N 103.618°E
- Founder: Fan Jianchuan
- Website: www.jc-museum.cn/en/

The Jianchuan Museum Cluster (Chinese: 建川博物馆聚落) is located in Anren Town, Dayi County, Sichuan province, China, about one hour's drive from the provincial capital Chengdu. It consists of 26 museums which showcase China's largest private collection of artifacts amassed during the last 60–70 years.

== Founding ==
The museum was founded by, and named after, Fan Jianchuan (1957), a local real estate billionaire native to Yibin, and a collector of Cultural Revolution Era memorabilia. Before starting his investments in real estate, Fan was the deputy major of Yibin. In 2003, he started investing his real estate earnings in the museums. Fan bought millions of historical items and bought 33 hectares of land in Anren, Dayi County.

The first five museums within the cluster opened to the public in 2005. As of 2015, Fan had invested RMB 2 billion in the museums. The museum cluster began operating at a break-even point in 2010.

== Exhibits ==
The complex features more than two million historical and cultural artefacts, mainly from the founder's personal collection, and has been hailed by the Los Angeles Times as an example of "the increasing openness about the way recent history is viewed in China." With a total area of 500 acres (2.0 km^{2}), the museum cluster is made up of 26 museums, as of 2015. It has a repository of over 8 million artifacts, with 121 of them classified as Class-One National Treasures. It is the largest museum cluster in China. Several hundred artifacts have also been donated to other museums.

The museums are organized by four major themes: Second Sino-Japanese War (1937–1945), the 'Red era', the Wenchuan earthquake, and Chinese folk culture.

In addition to museums, the cluster includes tourist facilities such as the Red Guard Inn, a People's Commune Restaurant, a revolutionary model opera-themed teahouse, and souvenir shops.

=== Museums ===
Exhibits are not arranged chronologically, but instead by material culture and function. For example, the first four Red Era museums exhibit porcelain, daily necessities, Mao badges, clocks, and seals, and mirrors, respectively.

==== Red Era theme ====
- Red Era Ceramics Exhibition Hall
- Red Era Living Necessities Hall
- Zhiqing Life Hall
- AVIC Museum
- Li Zhensheng Photography Museum
- Red Chronicles Exhibition Hall
- Red Era Mirrors Museum

==== Second Sino-Japanese War theme ====
- Unyielding Prisoners of War Museum, about the Sino-Japanese conflict between 1931 and 1945
- Hall of the Frontal Battlefield, dedicated to the Kuomintang efforts in fighting the Japanese
- Museum of the Communist Resistance Army
- Hall of the Heroes of the Flying Tigers
- Memorial Hall of Long March of the Red Army in Sichuan
- Hall of the Sichuan Army in the War of Resistance
- Chinese Warriors Group Culture Plaza
- China Anti-Japanese Veterans Handprints Plaza
- Foreign Volunteer Supporters of China Plaza
- Evidence of the Japanese War Crime, opened on the 70th anniversary of China's victory against the Japanese

==== Wenchuan Earthquake theme ====
- Memorial Hall of the 5.12 Earthquake Rescue
- Wenchuan Earthquake Museum, exhibiting object left damaged by the earthquake
- Earthquake Art Gallery
- Hu Huishan Memorial Hall, in memory of Hu Huishan, a female student of Dujiangyan High School, who died of the earthquake

==== Chinese folk culture theme ====
- The Memorial Hall of Yangtze River Rafting
- Old Mansion Furniture Exhibition Hall
- Three-inch Golden Lotus Cultural Relics Gallery
- National Defense Weapons Museum
- Liu Wenhui Former Residence Exhibition Hall

==== Other ====
- Jianchuan Art Exhibition Hall
- Reform and opening heroes plaza

== Gallery ==
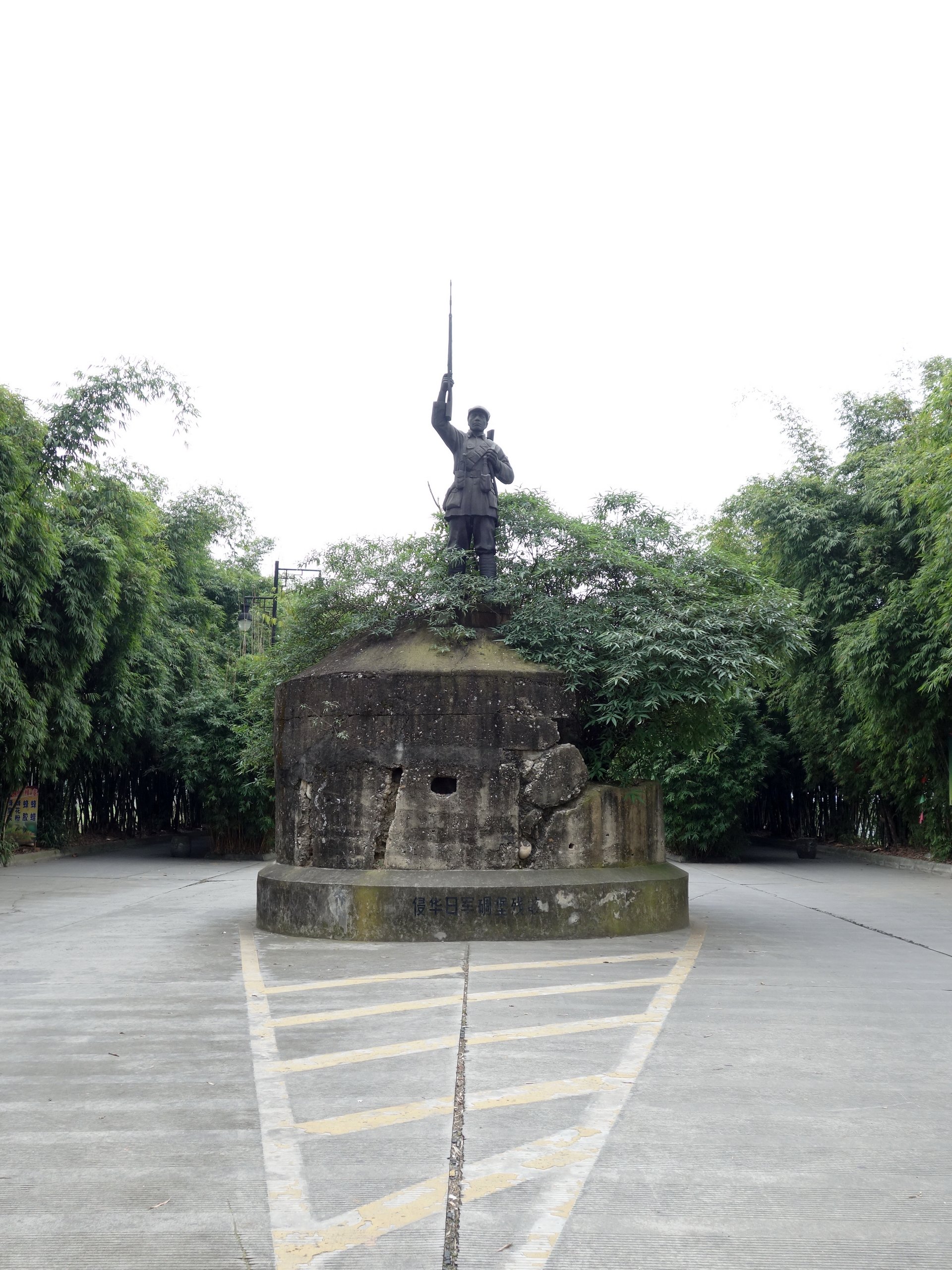
Jianchuan Museum Cluster Entrance

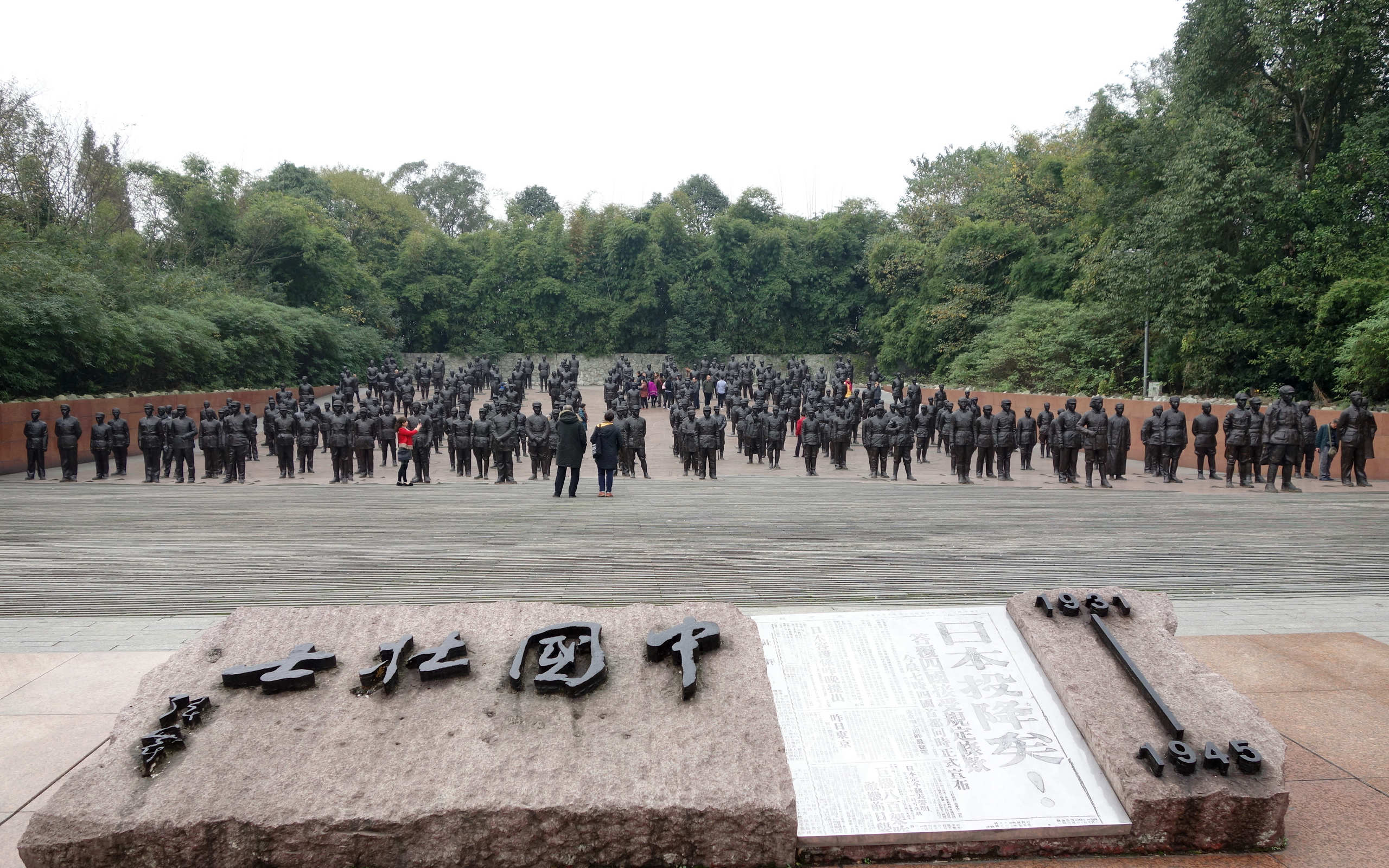

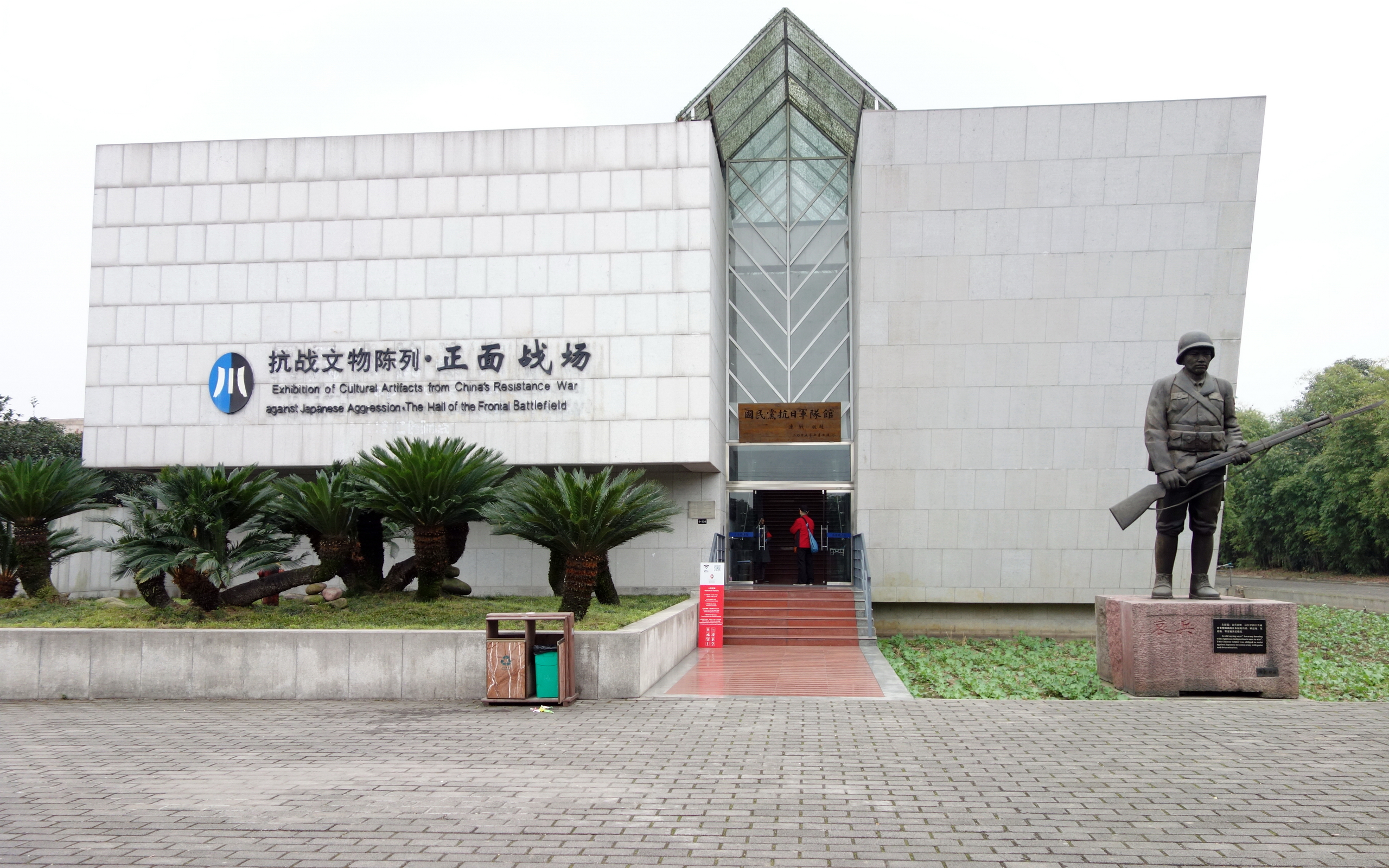

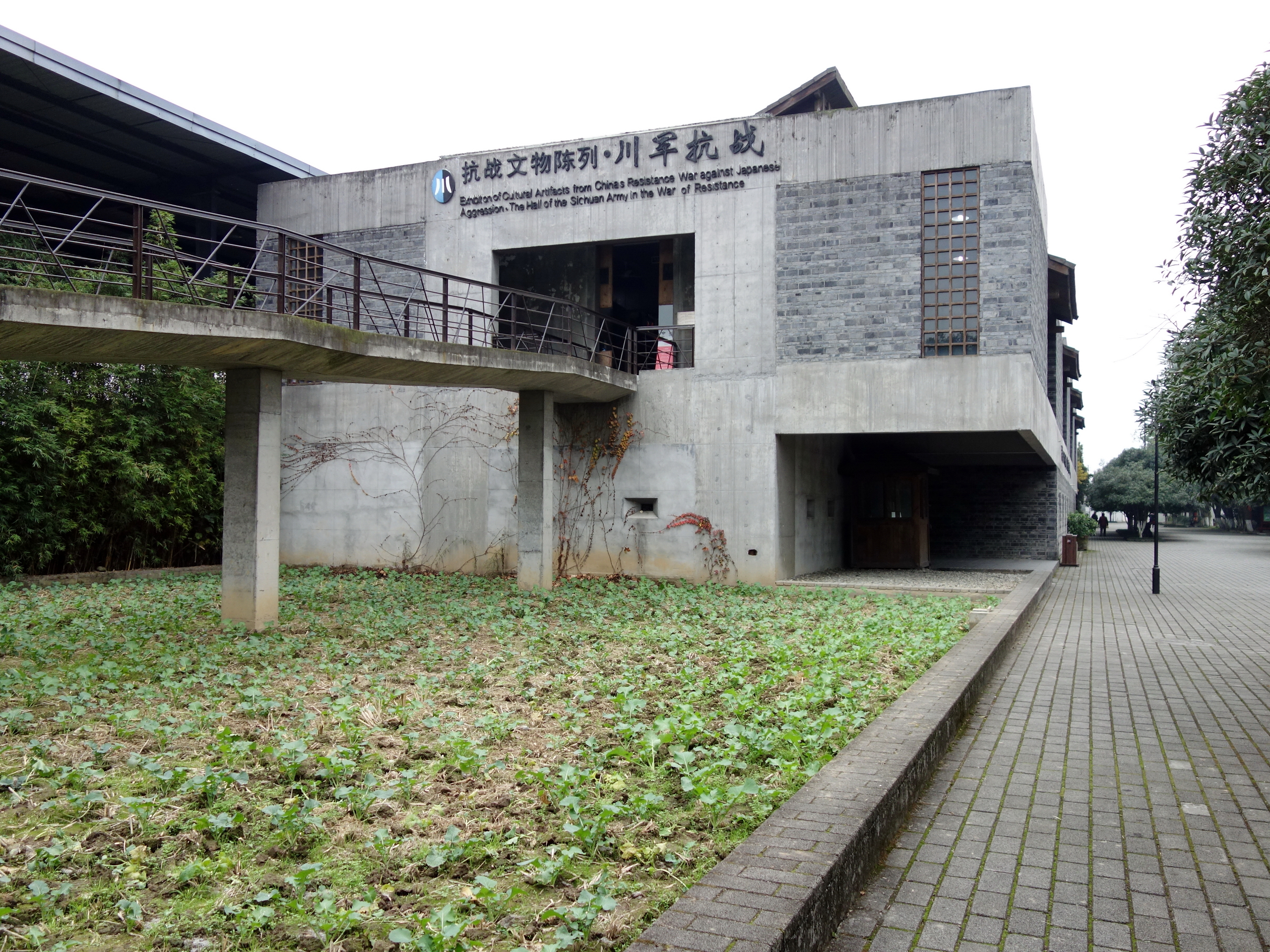

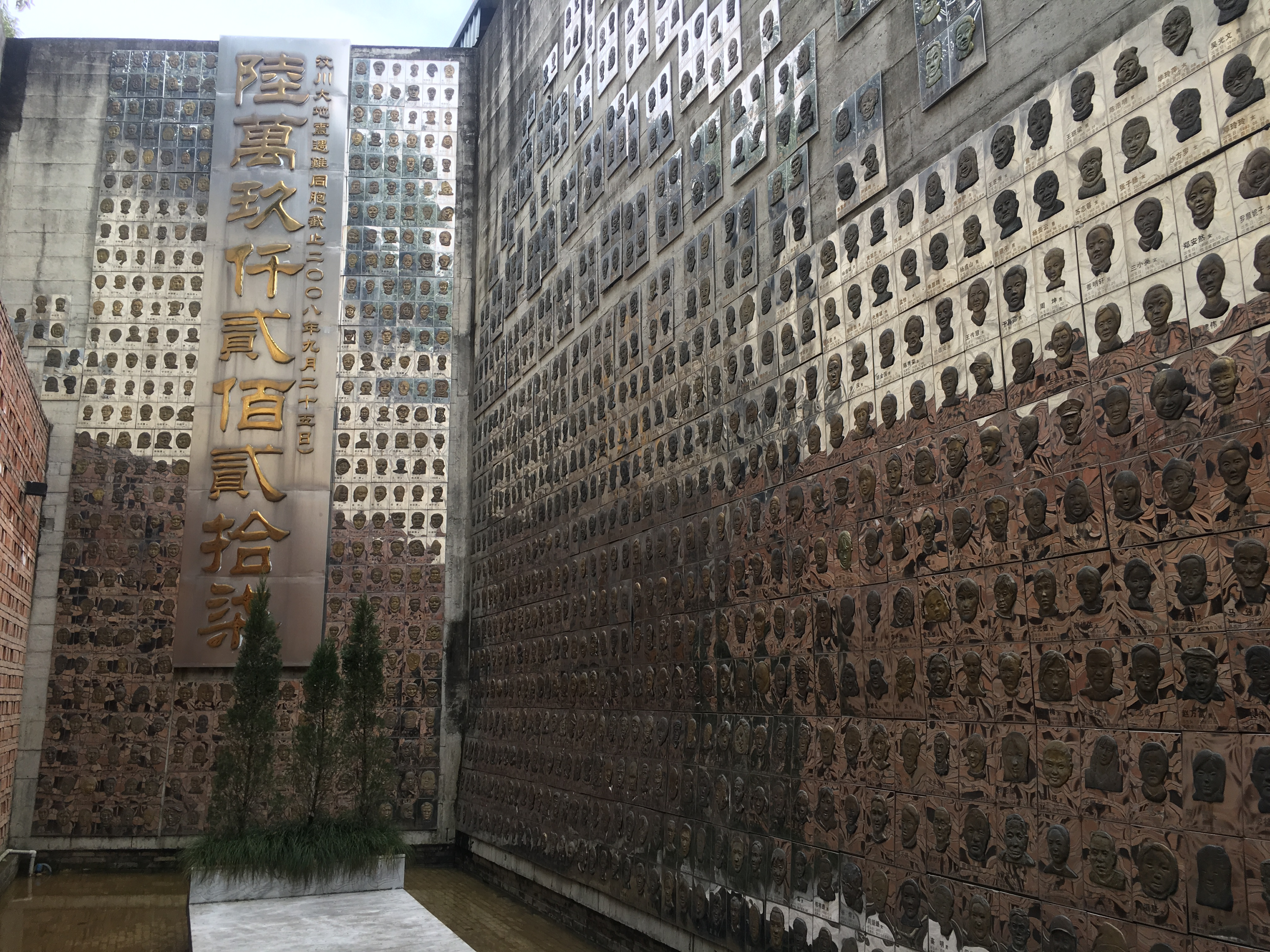
Exhibit of relief portraits of 1,812 people who died during the Wenchuan earthquake

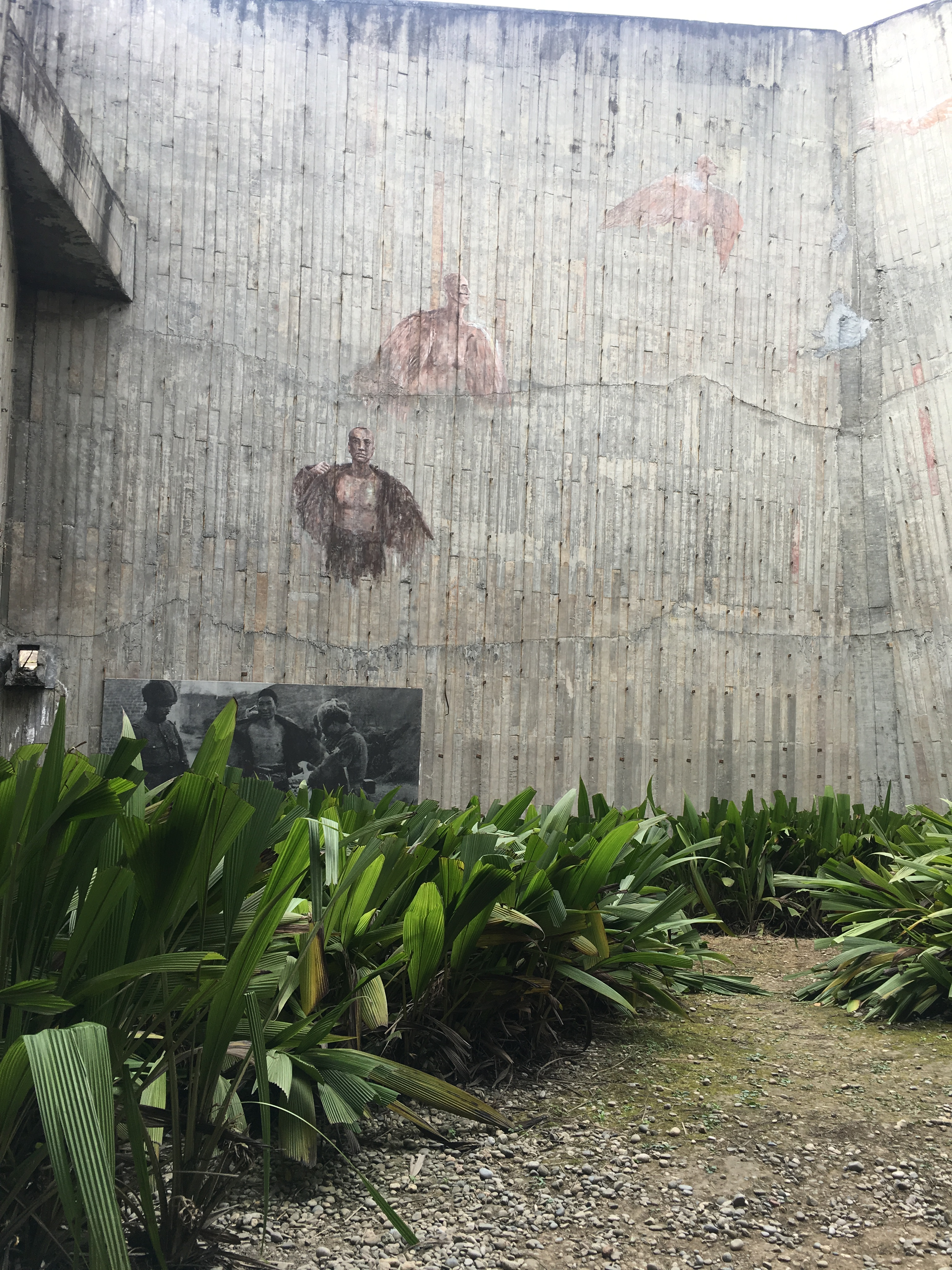

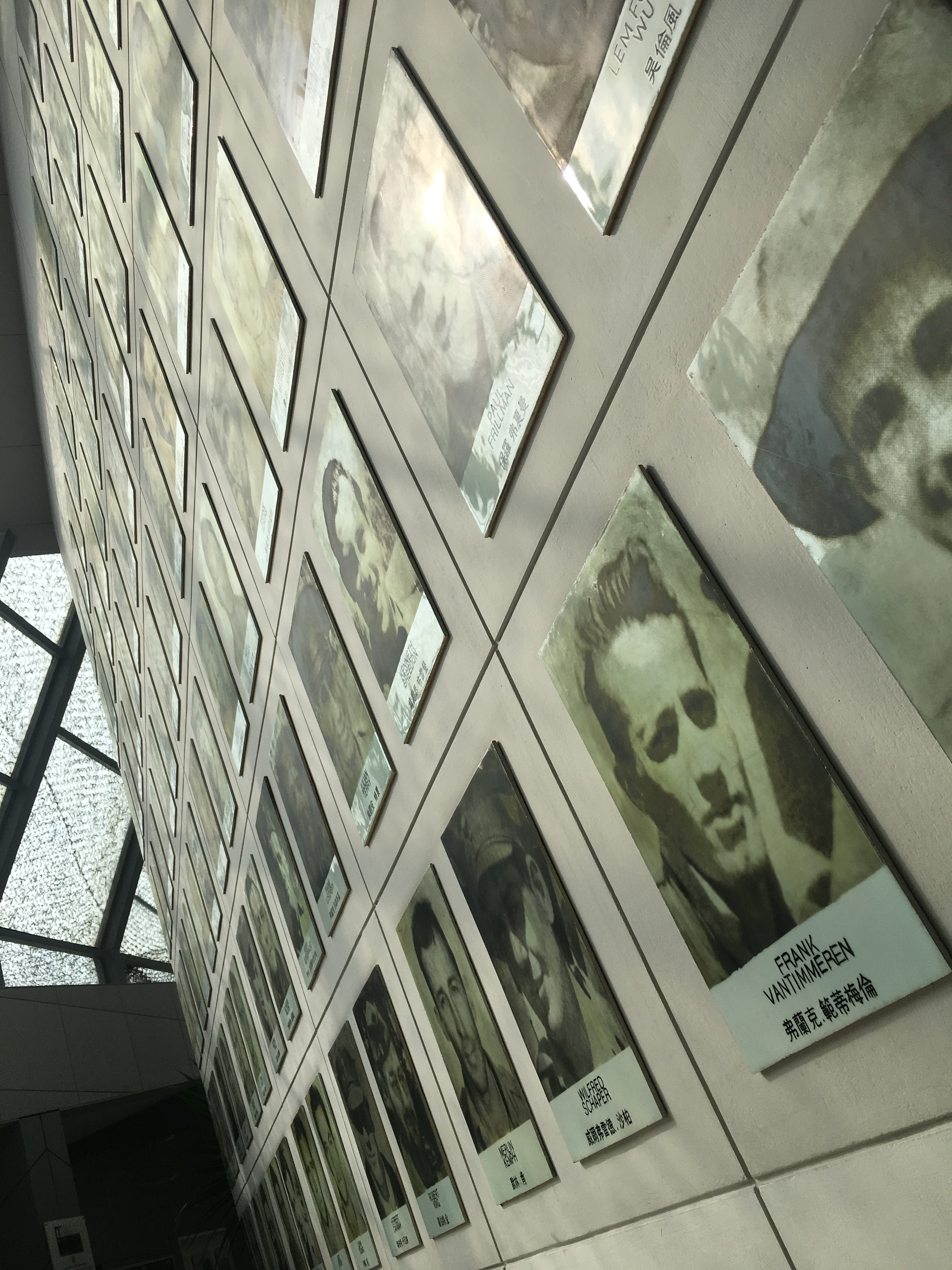

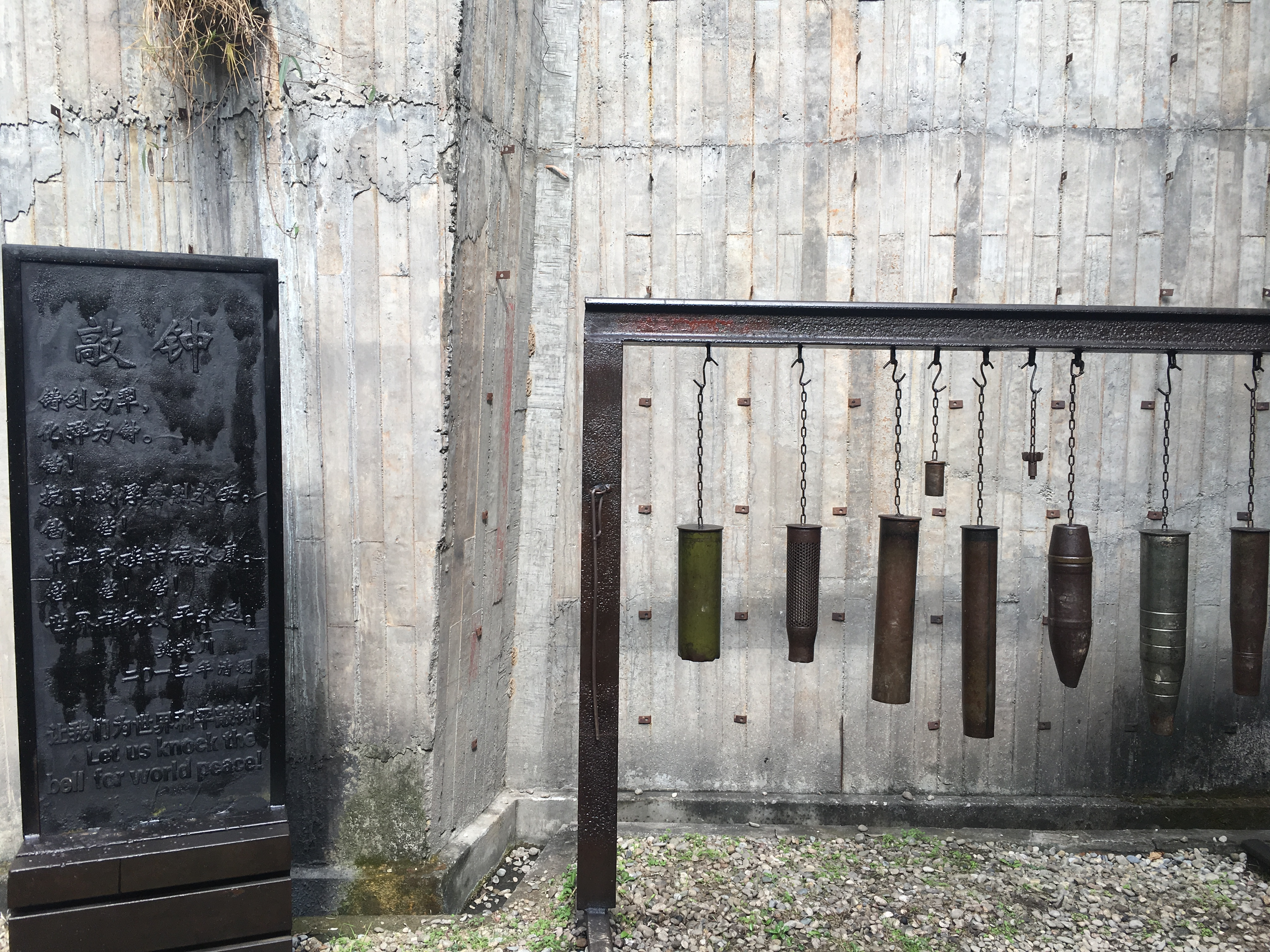

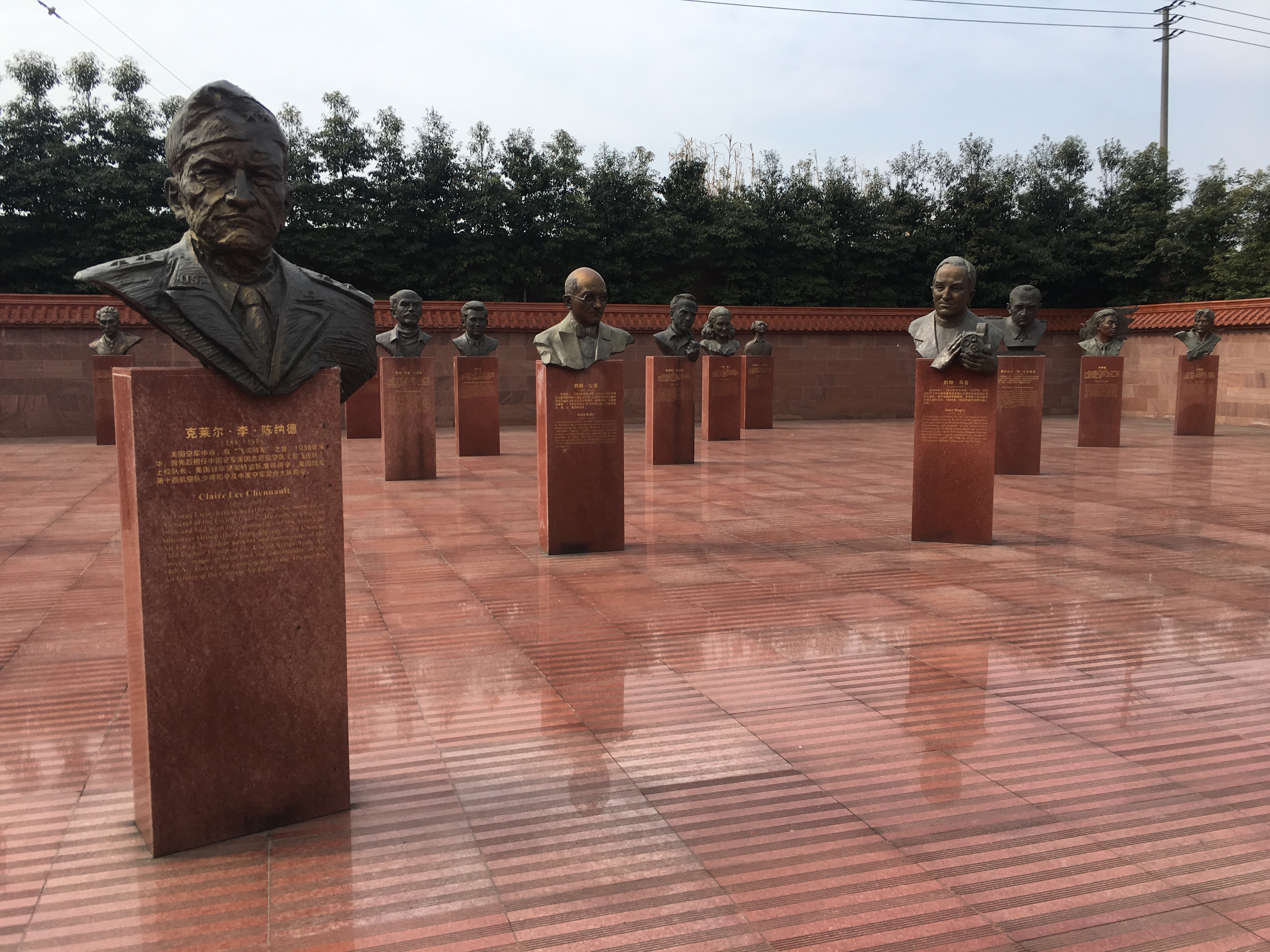
Foreign Volunteer Supporters of China Plaza

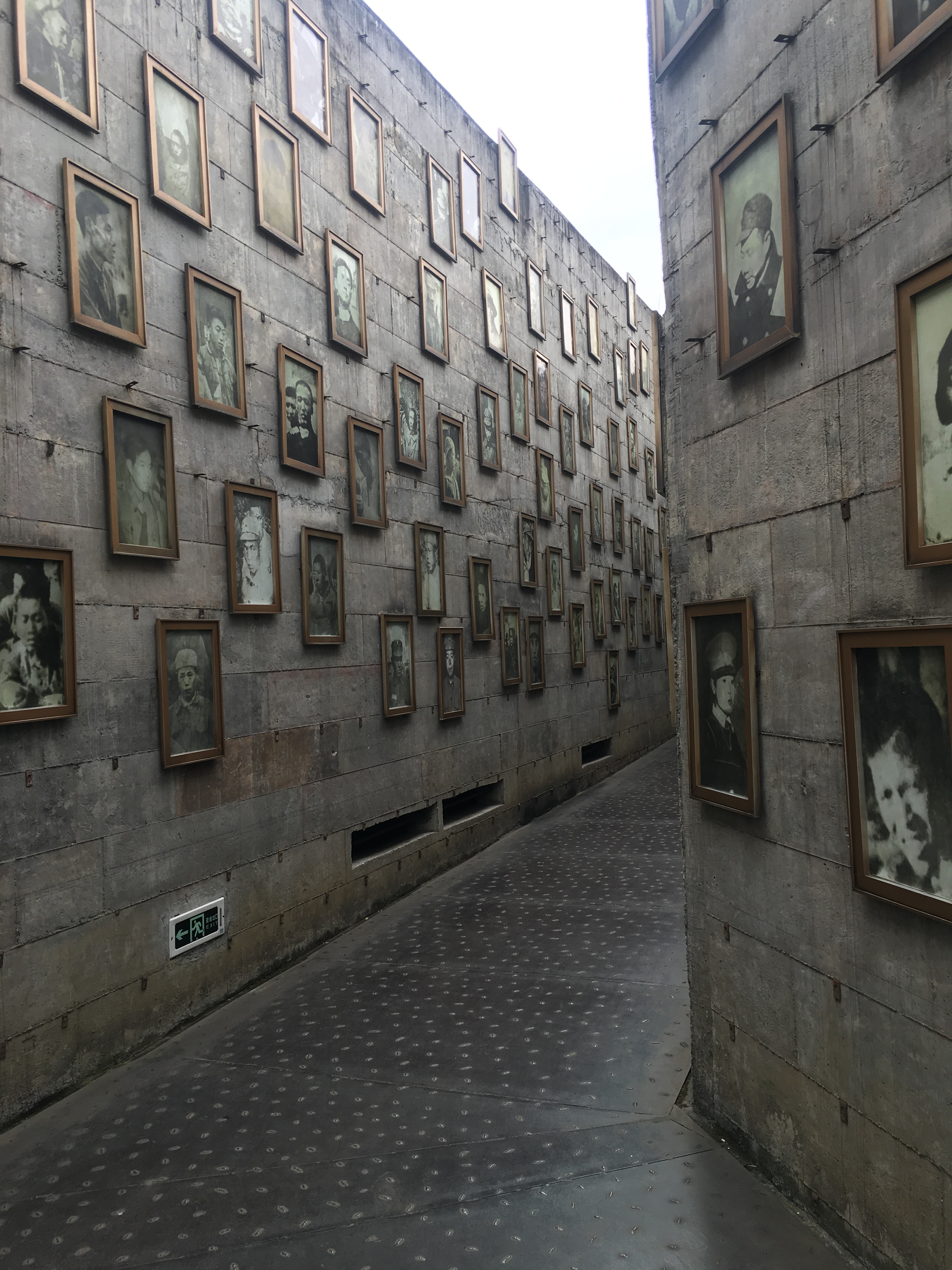

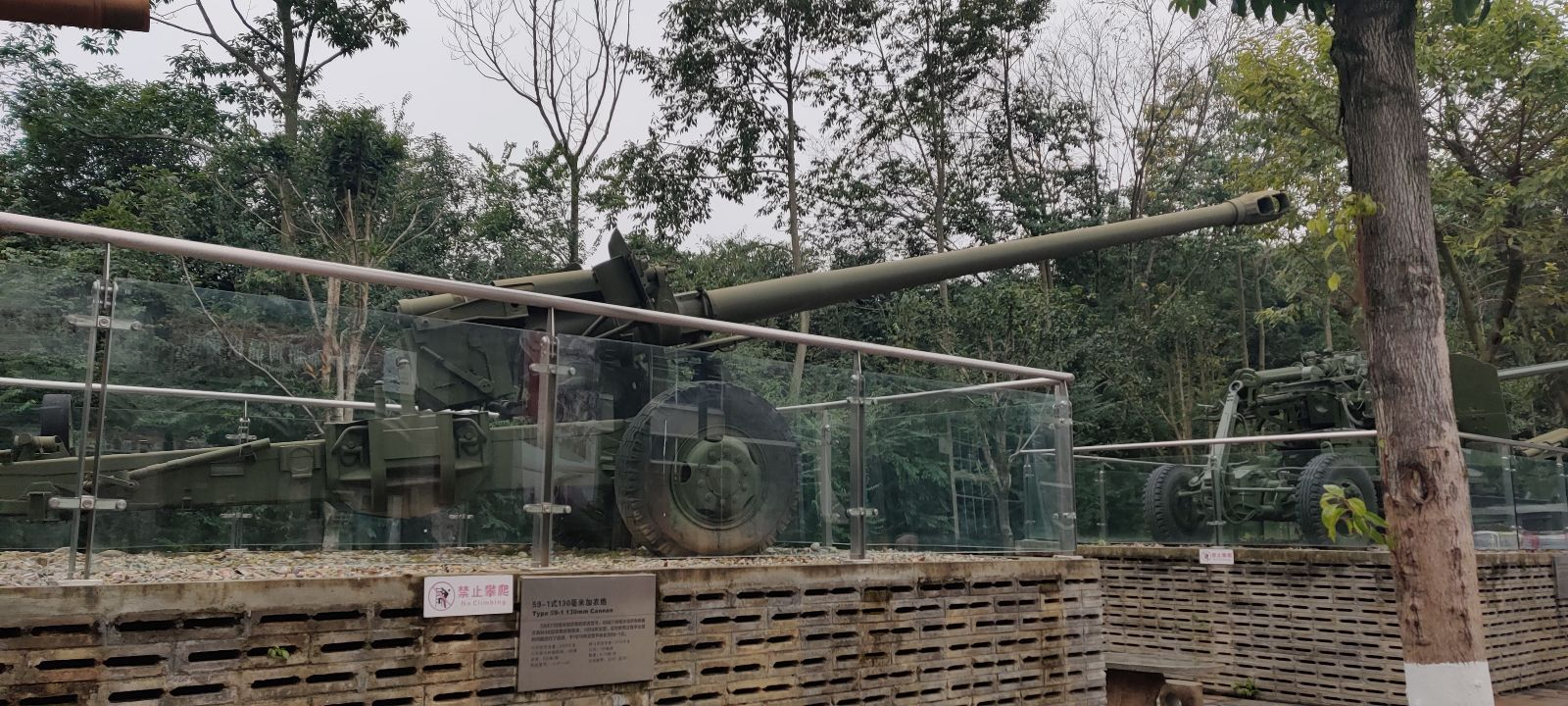
Type 59-1 130mm Field gun in Jianchuan museum

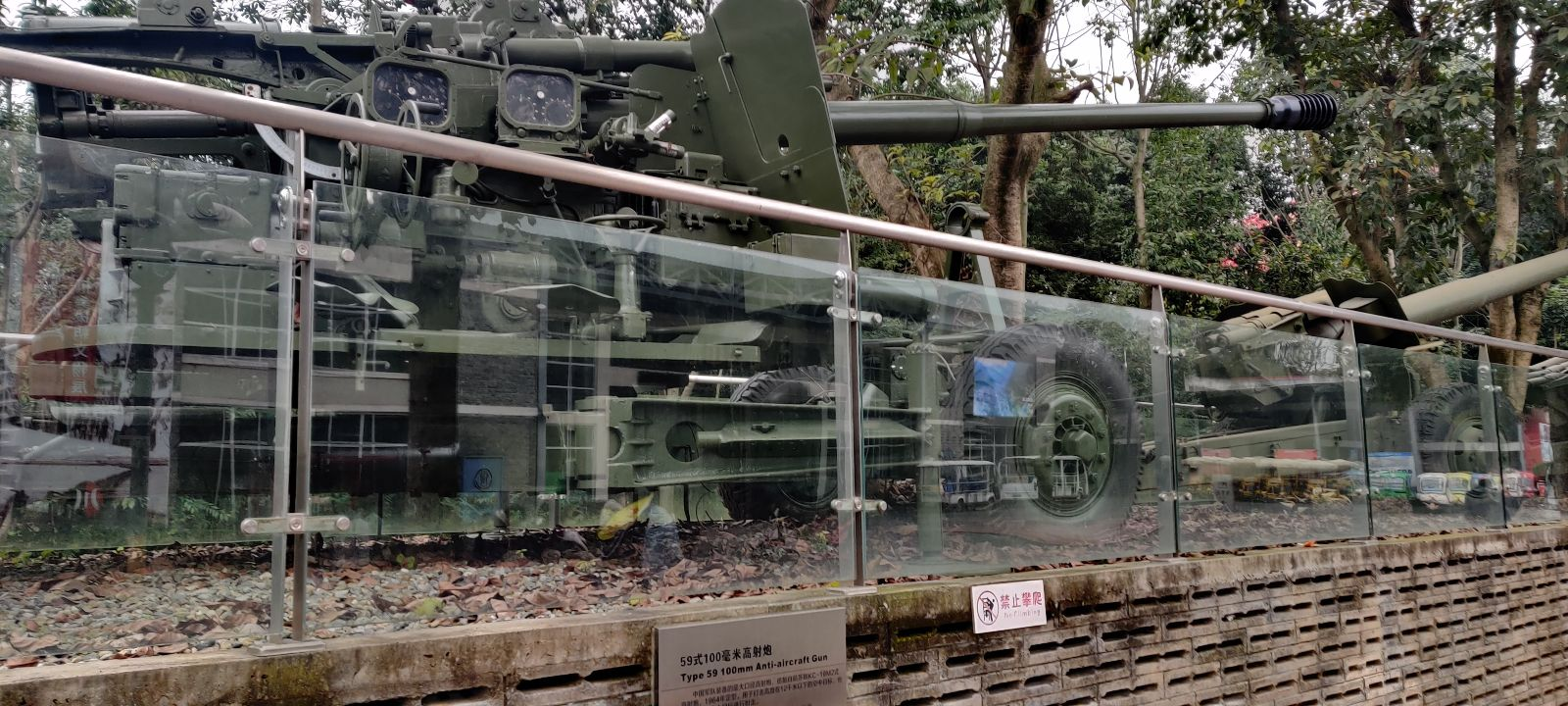
Type 59 100mm anti air gun

== See also ==
- List of museums in China
