= Jerry Davis =

Jerry Davis may refer to:

- Jerry Davis (American football) (1924–2006), American football defensive back
- Jerry C. Davis (born 1943), longtime president of College of the Ozarks
- Jerry Davis (politician) (born 1973), Texas politician
- Jerry Davis (screenwriter) (1917–1991), American director, producer, and screenwriter

== See also ==
- Jerome Davis (disambiguation)
- Gerry Davis (disambiguation)
