= Sam Falk =

United States photojournalist

Sam Falk (January 19, 1901 – May 19, 1991) was an Austrian-American photojournalist. He worked for The New York Times from 1925 to 1969, and also contributed to various other publications.

== Life and career ==
Born in 1901 in Vienna and emigrating early in life to America, Sam Falk was a self-taught photographer who at 16 years old sold his first photo of lightning taken with a simple box camera, to the New York Morning World for $10. Two years later he left school to work for a commercial photographer, and for him covered the Shamrock IV-Resolute yacht race.

He joined the staff of The New York Times in 1925 and remained for more than 40 years. In the 1940s he pioneered the use of 35-mm photography at the Times finding the usual press camera cumbersome, like the Anniversary Speed Graphic with 5-inch Graflex Optar f4.7 telephoto that he used to record a stumbling steeplechase horse throwing its rider at the Far Hills Races, N.J. He had to purchase his own 35mm camera, such was the prejudice against them at the newspaper, though editor Lester Markel liked his 'miniature' format pictures and often gave him 35mm assignments. The smaller camera became accepted after the Herald Tribune announced that their photographers were switching to the compact camera. Falk also used a Rolleiflex medium-format camera.

=== Portraiture ===
Falk toured with President Calvin Coolidge and covered the Lindbergh kidnapping trial, but after being switched from straight news in 1951, much of his photography for the Times was for features on well-known personalities, amongst whom were Edward Albee; Bernard Baruch: Albert Einstein; Dag Hammarskjöld; Julie Harris; Mayor Fiorello H. La Guardia of New York City; John D. Rockefeller; Eleanor Roosevelt: Franklin Delano Roosevelt Jr.; Arthur Rubenstein; Beverly Sills; Arturo Toscanini; the United Nations General Assembly; and Andy Warhol.

=== Street photography ===
Falk documented street life in the United States and in Austria (around 1955); England; Paris, France; and Italy from the 1940s to the 1960s. Falk photographed landmarks of New York City, such as Central Park; Chinatown; Grand Central Station; Greenwich Village; Harlem; John F. Kennedy International Airport; and Times Square. On April 2, 1951, Falk made black-and-white pictures for The New York Times Magazine of amateur photographers photographic landmarks in the metropolis. These images were the subject of a rephotography exercise carried out 68 years later, in digital colour, over April 1–3, 2019 by Tony Cenicola, a Times staff photographer, and paired with Falk's originals for an installment of the newspaper's 'Past Tense', an archival storytelling project.

=== Magazines ===
Later in his career, Falk retired from the newspaper in 1969 and went to San Francisco to work for the Sunday The New York Times Magazine and was President of the New York Institute of Photography. He regularly did photographic materials and equipment tests and reviews for magazines and published technical articles in Popular Photography and other mass-circulation magazines, and in books and manuals.

== Recognition ==
Falk's photograph of striking longshoremen was selected by Edward Steichen for the Museum of Modern Art's world-touring exhibition The Family of Man that was seen by 9 million visitors. Falk was only able to make the photograph after buying the strikers beers all round.

He died May 1991 of heart failure at the Sunrise Health Center in Sunrise, Florida, survived by his wife, Anne.

== Exhibitions ==
- 2002: Life of the City, February 28–May 21, The Museum of Modern Art
- 1996: Pictures of the Times: A Century of Photography from The New York Times, June 27–October 8, The Museum of Modern Art
- 1981: Midtown Y Photography Gallery, New York
- 1965: Smithsonian Institution solo exhibition
- 1964: Pepsi-Cola Exhibition Gallery, New York
- 1957/8: 70 Photographers Look at New York, November 27, 1957 – April 15, 1958, The Museum of Modern Art
- 1955: The Family of Man, January 24–May 8, The Museum of Modern Art
- 1949: The Exact Instant, February 8–May 1, The Museum of Modern Art

== Publications ==
- Millstein, Gilbert; Falk, Sam, (illus.) (1964), New York: true north (1st ed.), Doubleday
- Galassi, Peter; Kismaric, Susan; Safire, William, 1929-2009; Museum of Modern Art (New York, N.Y.) (1996), Pictures of the Times : a century of photography from the New York times, Museum of Modern Art : Distributed by Harry N. Abrams, Inc, ISBN 978-0-87070-116-0
- New York Times Photo Archives; Dreishpoon, Douglas; Trachtenberg, Alan; Weinstock, Nancy; Albright-Knox Art Gallery (2001), The tumultuous fifties a view from the New York Times Photo Archives (1st ed.), Buffalo, NY Albright-Knox Art Gallery in cooperation with the New York Times Photo Archives and Times History Productions, a division of the New York Times, ISBN 978-0-914782-99-5

== Collections ==
- The Museum of Modern Art holds three works in The New York Times Collection: 10:50 P.M.- And So Back Home (Mayor La Guardia), October 1941; On the Sidewalks of New York, June 21, 1942; The Return of Andy Warhol, 1968
- The Smithsonian Institution holds around 5,000 of Falk's negatives, transparencies and prints, donated by him in 1965 and 1968
