= Kenneth Jarecke =

American photojournalist

- Born: May 9, 1963 (age 63); Fairfax, Missouri
- Occupation: Photojournalist
- Notable credit(s): Took the famous incinerated Iraqi soldier that was published in The Observer, March 10, 1991.
- Spouse: Souad Jarecke
- Children: 4
- Website: www.kennethjarecke.com

Kenneth Jarecke (born 1963) is an American photojournalist, author, editor, and war correspondent. He has worked in more than 80 countries and has been featured in LIFE magazine, National Geographic, Sports Illustrated, and others. He is a founding member of Contact Press Images. He is notable for taking the famous photograph of a burnt Iraqi soldier that was published in The Observer, March 10, 1991. He currently resides on a ranch in Montana where he has raised his four children with his wife, a Syrian immigrant and business woman, Souad.

== Early life ==
Born 1963, in Fairfax, Missouri, Jarecke grew up the eldest of four, son to Melissa and Bernard Jarecke. He spent the majority his childhood and teen years in Nebraska.

His first discovery of photography was at age 15. He started using his father's 35 mm camera and quit football to make more time for the new pursuit. He graduated from William Jennings Bryan Senior High in 1981 at age 18. He had his first photo published that year. He then attended University of Nebraska Omaha, which is where he met his future wife, Souad.

== Career ==
Jarecke moved to New York City to pursue his dream of being a photojournalist. Still a teen, Jarecke landed in New York with minimal experience and talked his way into meeting Sports Illustrated editor, Barbara Hinkle. She encouraged him to start shooting in color rather than black and white. He met David Burnett and Robert Pledge of Contact Press Images at a photography workshop. Jarecke became a founding member of Contact Press Images and was assigned to photograph Oliver North at the start of the Iran-Contra hearings. LIFE magazine saw the resulting photos and hired him for some articles. Further opportunities came as a result of this work.

Jarecke was a White House photographer in the Ronald Reagan years. He covered the demonstrations in Tiananmen Square, the first Gulf War, and nine Olympic Games since 1988.

== Famous picture ==
In the hours leading up to the ceasefire that would end the first Gulf War Jarecke was traveling along the Iraqi - Kuwait highway when he came upon a truck destroyed by American bombardment. The picture Jarecke took features the charred remains of an Iraqi soldier with his last expression of pain imprinted on his face, his arms slumped over the window of the truck, attempting to lift himself out. Jarecke was travelling with a military public affair officer who allowed him to take the picture.

Due to the graphic content, Jarecke's photo was pulled from the AP wire which prevented the photo from being shown in the United States at the time. The photo caused considerable controversy in the United Kingdom after being published in The Observer. Vincent J. Alabiso, former Associated Press executive photo editor, regretted his actions and says that if the image was again transmitted now he would not censor it. The image can be viewed at the World Press Photo website.

== Published works ==
- Jarecke, Kenneth; Cervenka, Exene (1992). Just Another War (1st ed.). Bedrock Press. ISBN 978-0-9634784-0-5.- Total pages: 127
- Jarecke, Kenneth (25 November 2011). Husker Game Day 2010 - Farewell Big 12 (1st ed.). eyeQ Press. ISBN 978-0-615-55906-3.- Total pages: 256
