= Gerald Davis (American artist) =

American painter (born 1974)

- Born: 1974 (age 51–52); Pittsburgh, Pennsylvania, U.S.
- Education: Pennsylvania State University (BFA); School of the Art Institute of Chicago (MFA)
- Occupation: Artist

Gerald Davis (born 1974) is an American artist based in Los Angeles.

Davis was born in Pittsburgh. His early autobiographical paintings and drawings are rendered in oil paint and pencil, using muted, almost monochrome, colours, dealing with sexuality, desire and his memories of childhood trauma. Later imagery includes scenes from his personal history as well as an exploration of universal archetypes, in "eccentric renditions of classical subjects." He received his BFA from the Pennsylvania State University in 1997 and his MFA from the School of the Art Institute of Chicago in 1999.

== Collections ==
Davis' work is in international collections, including the Whitney Museum of American Art, New York; Hammer Museum, Los Angeles; Museum of Contemporary Art, San Diego, San Diego; and the Saatchi Gallery, London.

== Selected exhibitions ==
=== 2022 ===
You Can Cut All the Flowers, But You Cannot Keep Spring From Coming, Lundgren Gallery, Mallorca Spain

=== 2019 ===
Ecstatic Figure, La Loma Projects, Los Angeles

Rorschach Paintings, Lundgren Gallery, Mallorca Spain

=== 2017 ===
Paintings, Lundgren Gallery, Mallorca Spain

=== 2016 ===
House with Buried Figure, LTD, Los Angeles

=== 2012 ===
Paintings and Drawings, Lundgren Gallery, Mallorca Spain

=== 2010 ===
Nothing Is Coming to Me, Salon 94, New York

The Worry Vase, Parker Jones Gallery, Los Angeles

=== 2009 ===
The Damned, Salon 94, New York

=== 2008 ===
Unreal, Saatchi Gallery, London

=== 2007 ===
Der Wichser, Black Dragon Society, Los Angeles

At Home, curated by Mario Testino, Yvon Lambert Gallery, New York

=== 2006 ===
LAXed: Paintings From The Other Side, Peres Projects, Berlin, Germany

1986, Salon 94 and John Connelly Presents, New York

USA Today, Saatchi Gallery, London

From L.A., Baronian Francey, Brussels, Belgium

=== 2005 ===
Drawings, Tall Wall Space, The University of La Verne, California

Paintings and Drawings, Black Dragon Society, Los Angeles

=== 2003 ===
Gerald Davis: Drawings and Paintings, Black Dragon Society, Los Angeles, CA

=== 2002 ===
My Problem, Counterpoint Gallery, Los Angeles

=== 2001 ===
Drawing Invitational, Optimistic Gallery, Chicago
