= Lori Grinker =

American photographer

- Born: 1957 (age 68–69); New York City, United States
- Occupation: Documentary Photographer
- Website: www.lorigrinker.com

Lori Grinker (born 1957) is an American documentary photographer, filmmaker, and educator from New York City. She is best known for her self-directed, long-term projects, and has conducted these projects through photography, video, and multimedia. Grinker has had three books of her work published and has been exhibited and collected internationally.

== Life and work ==
Grinker studied photography at Parsons School of Design in New York City with Bernice Abbott, George Tice, and Lisette Model. While at Parsons, she conducted a photo essay on boxers who worked with boxing trainer Cus D'Amato. Although her project focused on nine-year-old pugilist Billy Hamm, she also met 13-year-old Mike Tyson during this time and would continue to photograph him for the next ten years, including his 1988 Sports Illustrated magazine cover. Grinker also covered 9/11, and took one of her most well-known photographs of firefighters raising the flag at Ground Zero during this time.

In 2007, Grinker covered Iraqi refugees in Amman, Jordan with her multimedia piece, Iraqi Refugee Crisis: Nothing Like My Home. For her book The Invisible Thread: A Portrait of Jewish American Women (co-authored with writer Diana Bletter) she traveled across America documenting the stories of Jewish women and what tied them together. Her book Afterwar: Veterans from a World in Conflict is an exploration of the effects of war on its many actors and victims after the wars have ended. In 2012 Grinker was commisioned to make her first short documentary, The Little Freedom Church, for the Black Heritage Network. In 2013, her self-produced and directed video Wilderness After War for the Dart Society about the effects of post-traumatic stress disorder (PTSD) on three former U.S. service members was featured on PBS Newshour. Her third book Mike Tyson was published by PowerHouse Books in 2022. In 2026, Grinker's first independent documentary short, Charlie & The Rocketman premiered at the Montclair Film Festival.

She is represented by Contact Press Images and CLAMP Art Gallery in NYC. Her work is included in the collections of the 9/11 Museum, The International Center of Photography, and the Museum of Fine Arts Houston.

== Publications ==
- The Invisible Thread: A Portrait of Jewish American Women
- Afterwar: Veterans from a World in Conflict
- Mike Tyson
