= Allen Davis =

Allen Davis can refer to:

- Allen Bowie Davis (1809–1889), American businessman
- George Allen Davis (1857–1920), American politician
- Iron Davis (George Allen Davis, 1890–1961), American baseball player
- Otis Davis (baseball) (Otis Allen Davis, 1920–2007), American baseball player
- Stephen Allen Davis (1949–2022), American singer and songwriter
- Allen Lee Davis (1944–1999), American executed murderer
- Richard Allen Davis (born 1954), American murderer sentenced to death
- Allen Davis, former member of American dream pop band The High Violets
- Wade Davis (baseball) (Wade Allen Davis, born 1985), American baseball player
- Raymond Allen Davis (born 1974), American former soldier charged with double murder in 2011 in the Raymond Allen Davis incident

== See also ==
- Al Davis (disambiguation)
- Alan Davis (disambiguation)
- Albert Davis (disambiguation)
- Alan Davies (disambiguation)
- Alun Davies (disambiguation)
- Al Davies (disambiguation)
