= Alan Davies (disambiguation) =

Alan Davies (born 1966) is a British comedian and actor.

Alan Davies may also refer to:

- Alan Davies (footballer) (1961–1992), English-born Welsh international footballer
- Alan Davies, guitarist of the Soft Boys
- Alan Davies (mathematician) (born 1945), professor of mathematics at the University of Hertfordshire, England
- Alan Davies (poet) (born 1951), American poet, critic and editor
- Alan Davies (charity executive), British chief executive of mental health charity Mind and local councillor
- Alan Davies (rugby union coach) (born 1944), head coach of the Wales national rugby union team, 1991–95
- Alan Davies (rugby league) (1933–2009), rugby league footballer of the 1950s and 1960s for Great Britain, England, Oldham, Wigan, Wakefield Trinity and Salford
- Alan Davies (RAF officer) (1924–1998), British Royal Air Force officer
- Alan Davies (headmaster) (born 1947), British headmaster convicted of false accounting
- Alan T. Davies (born 1933), professor of religion at the University of Toronto, Canada
- Alan Fraser Davies (1924–1987), Australian political scientist and author

== See also ==
- Al Davies (disambiguation)
- Al Davis (disambiguation)
- Alan Davis (disambiguation)
- Alun Davies (disambiguation)
