= Al Davis (disambiguation) =

Al Davis (1929–2011) was an American football executive.

Al Davis may also refer to:

- Al Davis (baseball) (flourished 1940s), American baseball player
- Al Davis (boxer) (1920–1945), American boxer
- Al Davis (Nebraska politician) (born 1952), American politician
- Allen Lee Davis (1944–1999), American executed murderer

== See also ==
- Allen Davis (disambiguation)
- Allan Davis (disambiguation)
- Alan Davis (disambiguation)
- Albert Davis (disambiguation)
- Alan Davies (disambiguation)
- Alun Davies (disambiguation)
- Al Davies (disambiguation)
