= Bert Davis (disambiguation) =

Bert Davis (1906–1981) was a footballer.

Bert or Bertie Davis may also refer to:

- Bert Davis (businessman), candidate in California lieutenant gubernatorial election, 2010
- Bert Davis, character in Gold Rush Maisie
- Bert Davis, in 1943 NFL draft
- Bertie Davis, character in Riptide (film)
- Bertie Davis (footballer) (1897–1973), English footballer
- A. R. Davis (1924–1983), British and Australian Asian Studies academic

== See also ==
- Albert Davis (disambiguation)
- Robert Davis (disambiguation)
- Bertram Davis, murderer
- Herbert Davis (disambiguation)
- Hubert Davis (disambiguation)
