= Herbert Davis =

Herbert Davis may refer to:

- Herbert Davis (academic administrator) (1893–1967), English literary scholar and university administrator
- Herbert James Davis (1890–1950), veterinary surgeon and political figure in Ontario
- Herbert Nathaniel Davis (1867–1900), Australian architect
- Herbert Davis, cinematographer on Grey's Anatomy
- Herb Davis, Canadian political candidate, see Conservative Party of Canada candidates, 2008 Canadian federal election
- Herb Davis, host of Land and Sea

== See also ==
- Bert Davis (disambiguation)
- Herbert Davies (1818–1885), English physician
