= Allan Davis =

Allan Davis may refer to:

- Allan Davis (cyclist) (born 1980), Australian road racing cyclist
- Allan Davis (director) (1913–2001), British-Australian actor, director and producer
- Allan Davis (footballer) (born 1948), Australian rules footballer
- Allan Davis (lord mayor) (1921–1994), Lord Mayor of London

== See also ==
- Allen Davis (disambiguation)
- Alan Davis (disambiguation)
