= Alan Davis (disambiguation) =

Alan Davis (born 1956) is a British writer and artist of comic books.

Alan Davis may also refer to:

- Alan L. Davis, American computer scientist (PhD 1972, Utah)
- Alan M. Davis (born 1949), American computer scientist (PhD 1975, Illinois)
- Alan Davis (priest) (1938–2021), Anglican Archdeacon

== See also ==
- Allan Davis (disambiguation)
- Al Davis (disambiguation)
- Alan Davies (disambiguation)
- Alun Davies (disambiguation)
- Allen Davis (disambiguation)
