= Alan Davies (headmaster) =

Alan Seymour Davies (born 21 February 1947) is a former headmaster (so-called "superhead") of Copland Community School and Technology Centre Foundation 1988–2009. In 2000, he was made a Knight Bachelor for services to education.

In 2013, Davies was convicted of false accounting (fraud), and given a 12-month suspended sentence. Consequently, his knighthood was rescinded in 2014. In 2019 he was ordered to pay back £1.4 Million he obtained through illegal bonuses to the local authority.
