= Alun Huw Davies =

Welsh vascular diseases researcher (born 1960)

Alun Huw Davies (born 16 January 1960) MA, DM, DSc, FRCS, FHEA, FEBVS, FLSW, FACPh, FMedSci, is a Welsh professor of vascular surgery at the Imperial College London and Imperial College Healthcare NHS Trust and former President of Sections at Royal Society of Medicine.

== Early life and career ==
Alun Huw Davies was born in 1960 in Swansea, Wales to Stanley Charles and Vera Davies. Secondary education at Bishop Gore School, Swansea. In 1981 he obtained his Bachelor of Science degree from the University of Cambridge (Emmanuel College) and four years later got his Master of Arts degree from the same place. A year prior to it he also obtained Bachelor of Medicine degree from University of Oxford (Magdalen College) and in 1993 got both Master of Arts and Doctor of Medicine degrees from the same place. Besides those alma maters Alun also attended University of Bristol, University of Plymouth and Harvard University. Since 1994 he works at the Charing Cross Hospital. Alun Davies is a member of various organizations including the American College of Phlebology, the European Society of Vascular Surgery, the Vascular Surgical Society, the Vascular Society for Great Britain and Ireland and the Association of Surgeons of Great Britain and Ireland. He is a Senior investigator at the National Institute for Health Research (NIHR), an Emeritus Fellow of the Australasian College of Phlebology and is a director of both the European College of Phlebology and Imperial College Private Healthcare. He was elected to the Fellowship of the Learned Society Of Wales in 2020 and Fellow of the Academy of Medical Science in 2024.

He is an editor of Phlebology Venous News and a contributor to the Vascular Surgery: Principles and Practice which was released in 2014. He has been the President of the surgical section and Venous forum at the RSM. He is currently president of the European College of Phlebology. He also wrote 2 chapters for the Thrombosis and Embolism: from Research to Clinical Practice. He has written over 600 peer reviewed articles mainly on Vascular disease.
