= Hubert Davis (disambiguation) =

Hubert Davis (born 1970) is a basketball player.

Hubert Davis may also refer to:

- Hubert Davis (artist)
- Hubert Davis (filmmaker)
- Hubert Davis, a Madison County, North Carolina sheriff who refused to leave office after losing the 1950 Madison County Sheriff election

== See also ==
- Bert Davis (disambiguation)
- Hubert Davies (1869–1917), British playwright and director
