= Raheem Sterling =

English footballer (born 1994)

Raheem Sterling MBE
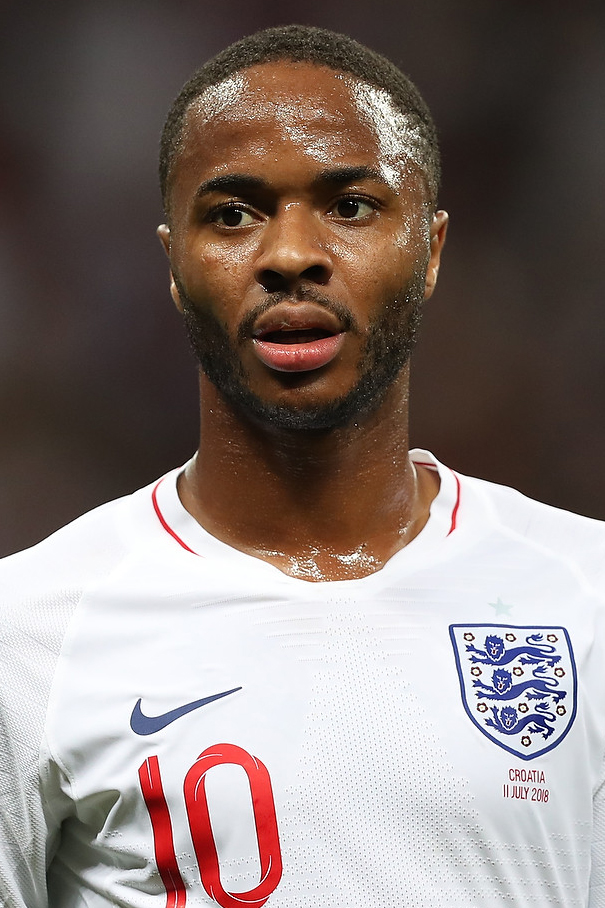
- Sterling with England in 2018

Personal information
- Full name: Raheem Shaquille Sterling
- Date of birth: 8 December 1994 (age 31)
- Place of birth: Kingston, Jamaica
- Height: 5 ft 8 in (1.72 m)
- Position: Winger

Youth career
- 1999–2003: Alpha & Omega
- 2003–2010: Queens Park Rangers
- 2010–2012: Liverpool

Senior career*
Years	Team	Apps	(Gls)
2012–2015	Liverpool	95	(18)
2015–2022	Manchester City	225	(91)
2022–2026	Chelsea	59	(14)
2024–2025	→ Arsenal (loan)	17	(0)
2026	Feyenoord	8	(0)

International career
2009–2010	England U16	7	(1)
2010–2011	England U17	13	(3)
2012	England U19	1	(0)
2012–2013	England U21	8	(3)
2012–2022	England	82	(20)
Medal record
Men's football
Representing England
UEFA European Championship
Runner-up	2020 Europe
UEFA Nations League
Third place	2019 Portugal
- * Club domestic league appearances and goals as of 11:38, 21 May 2026 (UTC)

Raheem Shaquille Sterling (born 8 December 1994) is a professional footballer who plays as a winger. He is currently a free agent. Born in Jamaica, he has played for the England national team.

Sterling began his career at Queens Park Rangers, before signing for Liverpool in 2010. He was awarded the Golden Boy award in 2014. In July 2015, following a lengthy dispute over a new contract, he was signed by Manchester City in a transfer worth £49 million with add-ons, the highest transfer fee paid for an English player at the time. He went on to help City win consecutive Premier League titles in the 2017–18 and 2018–19 seasons. In the 2018–19 season, he was included in the PFA Premier League Team of the Year and won the PFA Young Player of the Year and FWA Footballer of the Year. He won two further Premier League titles with the club in 2020–21 and 2021–22, before signing for Chelsea in July 2022. Sterling is currently the all-time English top assist provider in the UEFA Champions League, with 23. He joined Arsenal on loan for the 2024–25 season before returning to Chelsea. After leaving Chelsea, he joined Feyenoord as a free agent in February 2026.

Sterling made his debut for the England senior team in November 2012 after previously being capped by England youth teams at under-16, under-17, under-19 and under-21 levels. He was chosen in England's squads for the FIFA World Cup in 2014, 2018 and 2022, and the UEFA European Championship in 2016 and 2020.

== Early life ==
Raheem Shaquille Sterling was born on 8 December 1994 in Kingston, Jamaica to a Christian family, and spent his early years there. His mother, Nadine Clarke, was previously a competitive athlete in the Jamaican national athletics team: Sterling credits her for his unique running style. His father was murdered in Jamaica when Sterling was two years old. At the age of five, he moved to Neasden, London, with his mother, and attended Copland School in Wembley, north-west London. Due to behavioural problems, Sterling spent three years at Vernon House, a specialist school in Neasden. While growing up, he was a supporter of Manchester United, although went on to play for their biggest rivals.

== Club career ==
=== Early career ===
Sterling spent four years with local youth team Alpha & Omega before signing for Queens Park Rangers, at age 10, as a winger. Sterling was subsequently scouted by the academies of Arsenal, Chelsea, Fulham, Liverpool and Manchester City. However, he was encouraged by his mother not to choose clubs in the locality to escape the hostile gang culture in London.

=== Liverpool ===
==== Early career ====
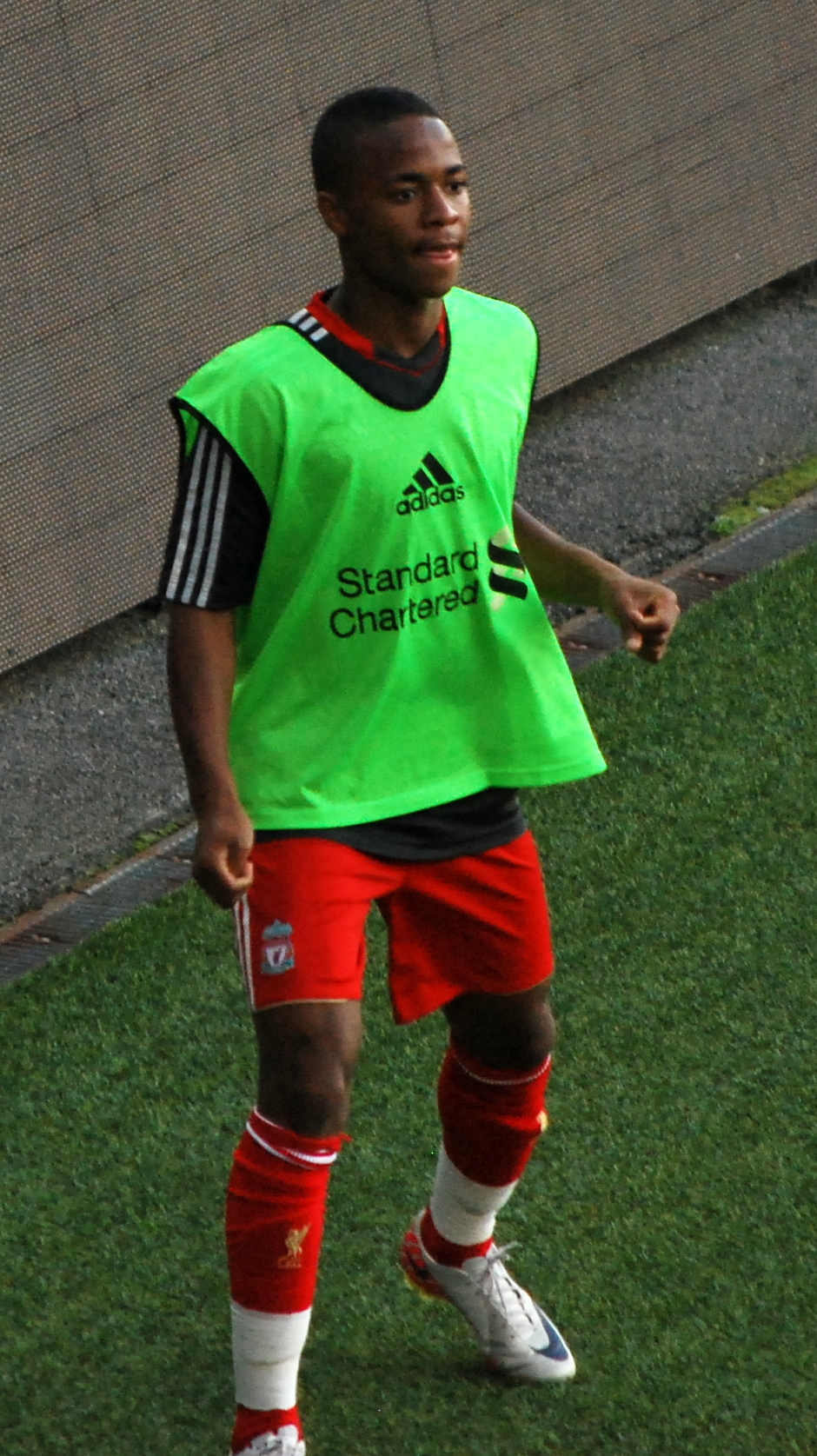
Sterling warming up for Liverpool in 2011

Sterling was signed by Liverpool from the academy at Queens Park Rangers in February 2010 by then academy director Frank McParland and Rafael Benítez, for an initial fee of £450,000, with the possibility of rising up to £2 million depending on how many appearances he made for the first team.

He initially played in the club's youth team, making his debut in an under-18s derby match against Everton. Sterling scored his first goal for Liverpool in a friendly match against Hibernian, which ended in a 2–2 draw. His first Premier Academy League match was a 2–2 draw against Aston Villa, with his first win coming at home to Bristol City a week later. On 15 December, he scored in the FA Youth Cup in a 4–0 win over Notts County. On 14 February 2011, Sterling scored five goals in a 9–0 win over Southend United.

On 24 March 2012, Sterling made his senior Liverpool debut as a substitute in a league match against Wigan Athletic, aged 17 years and 107 days, becoming the third-youngest player to play for the club. He made two more appearances over the remainder of the campaign, again as a substitute.

==== 2012–2014: Development and breakthrough ====
In August 2012, he made his European debut for the club, coming on as a substitute in a UEFA Europa League qualifying match against Gomel, replacing Joe Cole in a 1–0 away win. The following week, Sterling scored his first goal for the senior team with a first-half strike in a friendly against Bayer Leverkusen. On 23 August 2012, he started his first match for Liverpool in a Europa League qualifying match away to Heart of Midlothian in a 1–0 win. He was given his first start in the league three days later in a 2–2 draw at Anfield to Manchester City. He played the full 90 minutes in the loss to Arsenal on 2 September, and the draw with Sunderland on 15 September, where he registered one assist and was named man of the match. On 19 September, Sterling was one of the group of teenagers that travelled to Switzerland to play Young Boys in a UEFA Europa League group match. He replaced Stewart Downing in the second half as Liverpool won 5–3. On 20 October, Sterling scored his first senior competitive goal for Liverpool in the 29th minute of a 1–0 league win against Reading with a strike from the edge of the box. As a result, he became the second-youngest player to score in a competitive fixture for Liverpool, behind only Michael Owen.

On 21 December 2012, Sterling signed a contract extension, committing his future to Liverpool. He scored his second league goal for the club on 2 January 2013, opening the scoring in a 3–0 win against Sunderland with a lob over goalkeeper Simon Mignolet.

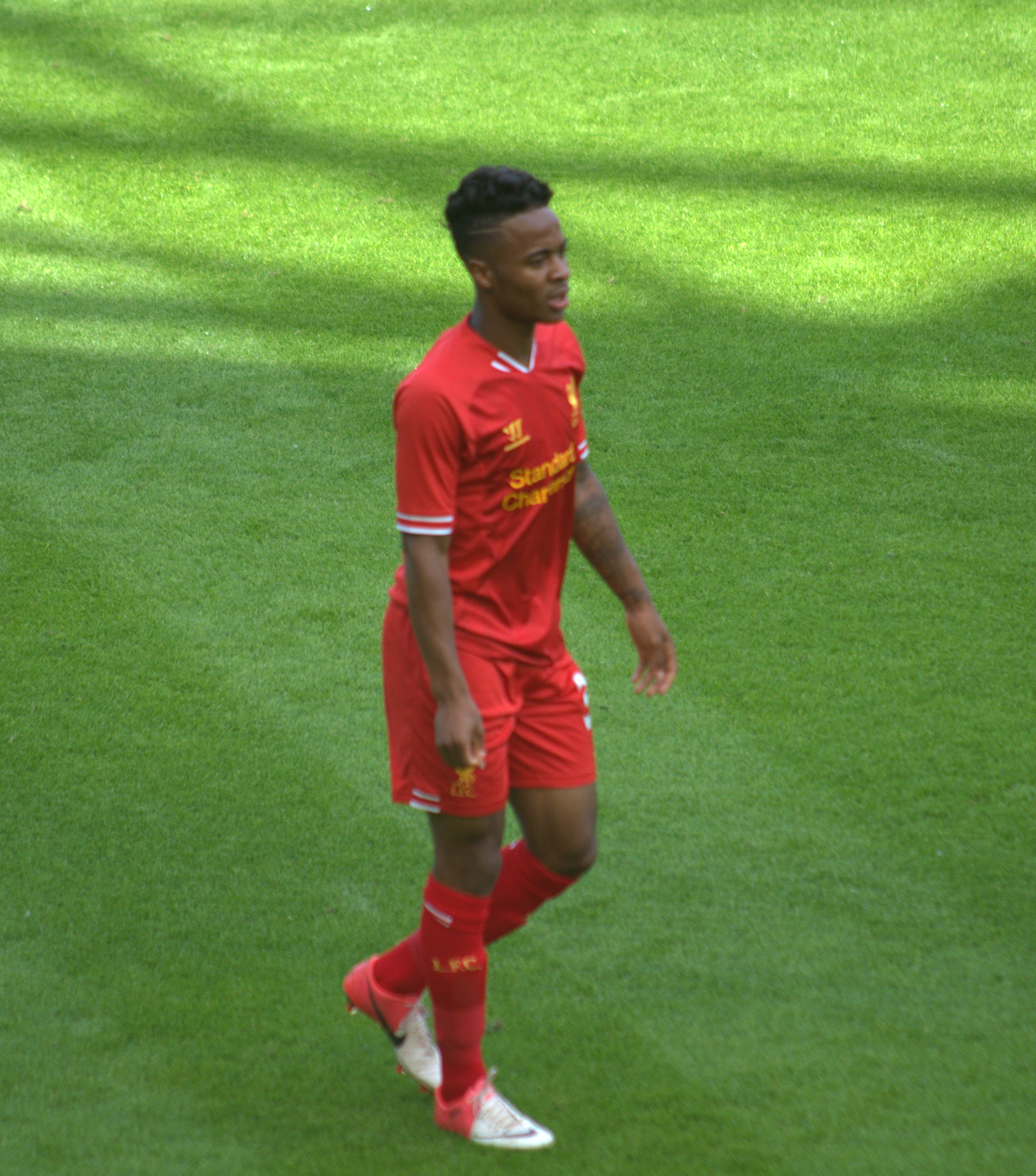
Sterling playing for Liverpool in 2013

On 27 August 2013, Sterling scored his first goal of the 2013–14 season, the opening goal against Notts County in a 4–2 win in the League Cup. On 4 December, Sterling scored his first Premier League goal of the season for Liverpool in a 5–1 win over Norwich City. His form in December saw him score two further goals in wins against Tottenham Hotspur (5–0) and Cardiff City (3–1). On 8 February 2014, he scored twice in a 5–1 win against Arsenal at Anfield. On 13 April, he scored Liverpool's opening goal in a 3–2 win over Manchester City. A week later, he again scored two goals and assisted another as Liverpool won 3–2 against Norwich City at Carrow Road.

On 18 April 2014, Sterling was named as one of the six players on the shortlist for the PFA Young Player of the Year award. He was named Liverpool Chartered Player of the Month for April. At the end of the season, he was named Liverpool's Young Player of the Year.

==== 2014–2015: Final season with Liverpool ====
On 17 August 2014, Sterling scored to help Liverpool win their opening match of the 2014–15 season, a 2–1 win at home to Southampton. On 31 August, Sterling scored the opening goal in a 3–0 league win against Tottenham at White Hart Lane and was named man of the match. Sterling was named the Liverpool Player of the Month for August.

On 16 September, Sterling made his UEFA Champions League debut in a 2–1 victory over Bulgarian champions Ludogorets Razgrad at Anfield. On 14 December 2014, he made his 100th appearance for Liverpool in a match against Manchester United at Old Trafford. On 17 December, Sterling scored a brace in a 3–1 victory over Bournemouth at Dean Court in the League Cup quarter-final.

On 20 December, Sterling was named as the recipient of the 2014 Golden Boy award. "It's down to hard work. I'm really happy that people are recognising that I'm trying to work hard and do my best for this football club. I'm really grateful for this award," he stated upon receiving the award. Sterling was officially excused from Liverpool's FA Cup match against AFC Wimbledon in January 2015, with manager Brendan Rodgers aiming to prevent the player becoming exhausted. He used the time off to holiday in Jamaica.

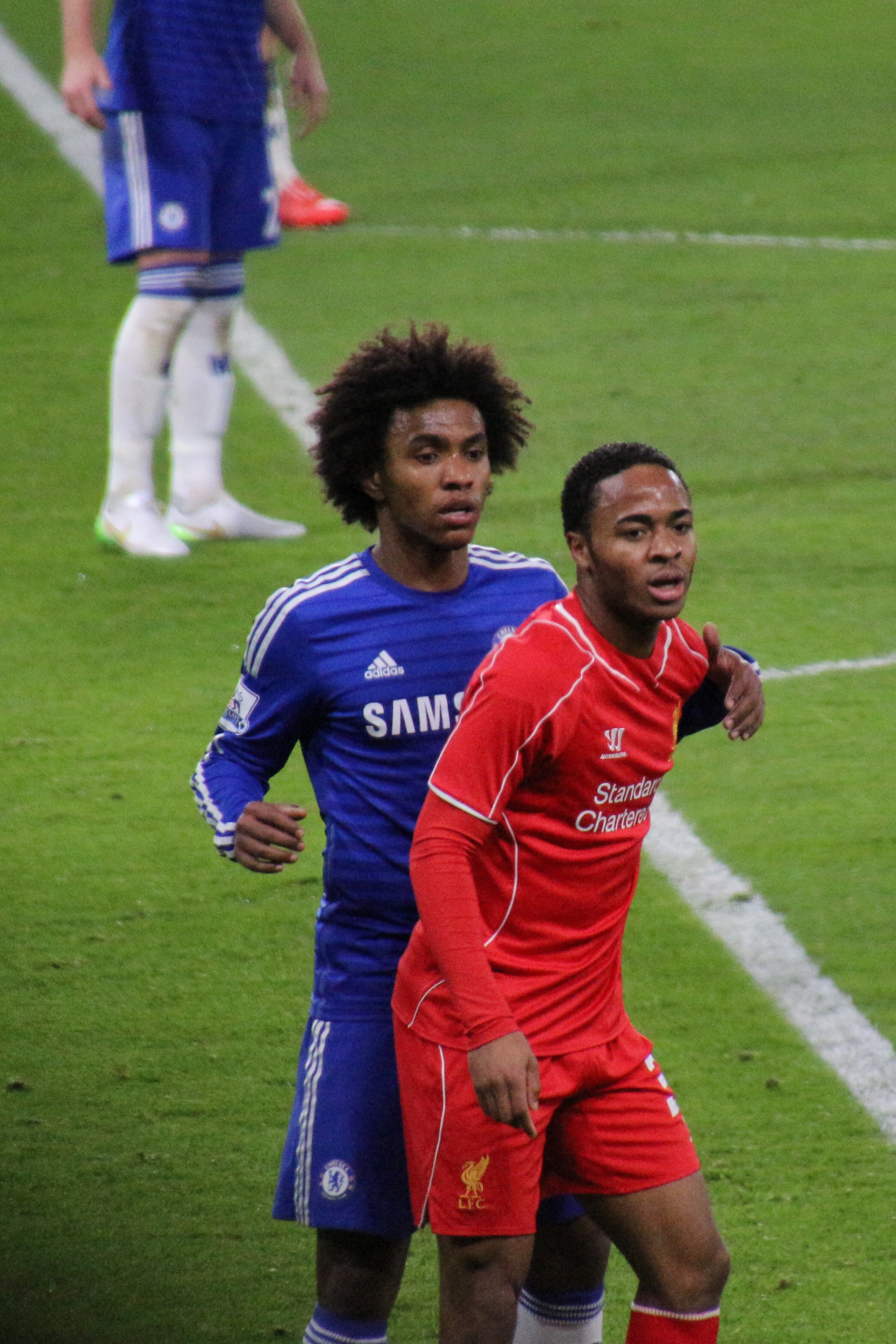
Sterling (right) playing for Liverpool in 2015

On 20 January 2015, Sterling scored a fine solo goal against Chelsea in a 1–1 draw in the League Cup semi-final first leg at Anfield, going past Nemanja Matić and Gary Cahill before beating Thibaut Courtois to find the net. On 31 January, Sterling scored the opening goal in a 2–0 win over West Ham United. On 4 February, Sterling scored the equaliser against Bolton Wanderers at the Macron Stadium in a 2–1 away win for Liverpool. On 22 February, he scored the second goal for Liverpool in a 2–0 win over Southampton.

On 13 April, Sterling opened the scoring in a 2–0 win over Newcastle United. He was named the team's Young Player of the Season on 19 May for the second consecutive year in a row, and when receiving the award was booed by fans due to his rejection of a new contract; he was also booed on 7 June, while playing for England in Dublin. On 16 April 2015, for the second consecutive year, he was named as one of the six players on the shortlist for the PFA Young Player of the Year award.

==== Contract dispute ====
On 9 February 2015, Brendan Rodgers said that Sterling had been offered "an incredible deal" to stay at Liverpool, rumoured to be a new contract worth £100,000 a week, but he also stated Liverpool were "certainly not a club that is going to give way, way above what a player is worth at a certain time in their career." However, on 20 March, Rodgers said Sterling's contract situation would not be resolved until the summer at least.

On 1 April, Sterling gave an unsanctioned interview with the BBC, where he confirmed he had turned down a new deal, but denied that this was for reasons of money. He had two years of a £35,000 per week contract remaining and said that he would not negotiate a new contract until the end of the season. Four days later, Brendan Rodgers criticised Sterling's advisors, particularly Aidy Ward, for the interview, saying: "You are not a 20-year-old boy and you pick up the phone and ask to speak to the BBC. You don't do it. Him in particular. But, of course, if he is asked to do that by other parties then that is what he'll do."

On 21 May, amid rumours that Sterling intended to leave the club, his agent, Ward, gave an interview to the London Evening Standard saying: "I don't care about the PR of the club and the club situation... He is definitely not signing. He's not signing for £700, £800, £900 thousand a week."

On 11 June, Liverpool reportedly rejected an initial bid of £30 million from Manchester City. One week later, they reportedly rejected a second bid from City for £40 million, with Liverpool valuing Sterling at £50 million. Sterling reportedly later asked to be left out of Liverpool's preseason tour to Asia, and missed two days of training through illness, which was met with widespread criticism from former Liverpool players, including Steven Gerrard, Jamie Carragher and Graeme Souness.

=== Manchester City ===
==== 2015–2016: Record breaking transfer and debut season ====
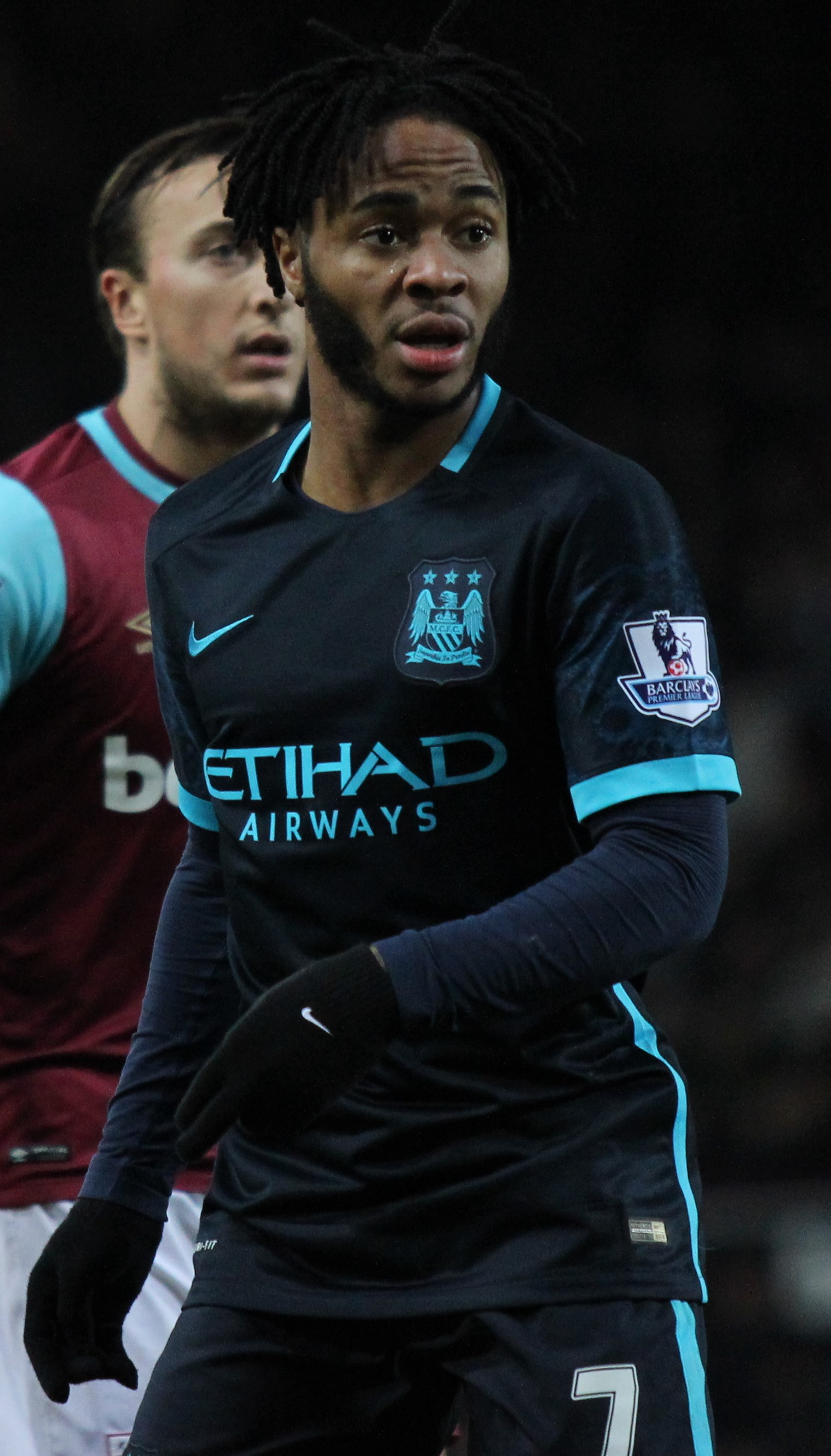
Sterling playing for Manchester City in 2016

On 12 July 2015, a deal was agreed for his transfer to Manchester City for an initial £44 million, with a further potential £5 million in add-ons, subject to personal terms and a medical, which made him at the time the most expensive English footballer ever. On 14 July, Sterling officially joined Manchester City, signing a five-year contract. His debut came on 10 August, starting as City began the season with a 3–0 win away to West Bromwich Albion. Nineteen days later, Sterling scored his first competitive goal for Manchester City in a 2–0 win against Watford at the City of Manchester Stadium. Sterling scored his first career hat-trick as City beat Bournemouth 5–1 on 17 October.

On 3 November, Sterling scored his first UEFA Champions League goal in a 3–1 win away to Sevilla. On 8 December, he scored twice in the final ten minutes of City's last group stage fixture against Borussia Mönchengladbach, helping turn a 2–1 deficit into a 4–2 win and ensuring City overtook Juventus in the final group standings. On 20 March 2016, he suffered a groin injury in a 1–0 loss to rivals Manchester United, and was ruled out for eight weeks. Sterling eventually lost his place in the starting line-up.

==== 2016–2018: Collective and individual success ====
Sterling appeared regularly for Manchester City under Pep Guardiola for the opening matches of the 2016–17 season. He was Premier League Player of the Month for August 2016 after he scored two goals and provided one assist in three games. On 21 February 2017, Sterling scored the opener before setting up a goal for Sergio Agüero in a 5–3 home win against Monaco in the Champions League.

On 26 August 2017, Sterling scored the winner in a 2–1 away win over AFC Bournemouth in stoppage time. He was sent off by Mike Dean with a second yellow after he celebrated among travelling supporters that had run onto the pitch. On 29 November 2017, Sterling scored a 96th-minute winner against Southampton in a 2–1 home win. He scored his eighteenth and final league goal of the season during a 5–0 victory at Swansea City on 22 April 2018, his most ever at this point in his career.

==== 2018–2019: Domestic treble with City ====
Following England's World Cup campaign, Sterling made an immediate return to the Manchester City starting line-up. On 12 August 2018, less than a month after starting in England's 2–0 loss against Belgium in the third place play-off, Sterling scored the opening goal in Manchester City's 2–0 away win against Arsenal. The strike was Sterling's 50th Premier League goal. On 4 November 2018, Sterling scored twice and made two assists in a 6–1 win against Southampton at home, scoring his 50th goal for Manchester City in all competitions in the process. In November 2018, he signed a three-year extension to keep him at City until 2023.

In December 2018, Sterling alleged that sections of the media served to "fuel racism" with their portrayal of young black footballers. The comments emerged after Sterling was subjected to alleged racist abuse during City's 2–0 defeat at Chelsea.

He began 2019 with a 2–1 win against Liverpool, where he assisted Leroy Sané's winning goal. On 6 January 2019, he scored a goal and assisted one in a 7–0 win against Rotherham, which booked their place in the fourth round. On 20 January 2019, he headed a goal to help City win 3–0 over Huddersfield Town. On 3 February 2019, he helped assist two of Sergio Agüero's goal to beat Arsenal 3–1, which helped City move two points behind Liverpool. On 20 February, in a first leg match of the Champions League against Schalke, he scored the winning goal in the 90th minute in a 3–2 win.

In the 2019 EFL Cup final on 24 February, he scored the winning penalty in the penalty shootout to win the cup. The following month, he scored a hat-trick for the first time since 2015 within the space of 13 minutes – the fastest hat-trick of the season – to secure a 3–1 victory over Watford. He scored again in the return leg of Man City's Champions League clash with Schalke to help the club record a 7–0 (10–2) victory and equal the record for the largest winning margin in the knockout-phase of the competition. On 17 April 2019, Sterling scored two in Manchester City's 4–3 win over Tottenham Hotspur in their UEFA Champions League quarter-final second-leg; however, they were knocked out on away goals after losing 1–0 in the first leg. On 18 May 2019, Sterling scored twice as Manchester City defeated Watford 6–0 in the 2019 FA Cup final to clinch a domestic treble.

In the 2018–19 season, he was included in the PFA Premier League Team of the Year and won the PFA Young Player of the Year and FWA Footballer of the Year.

==== 2019–2020: Thirty-goal season ====
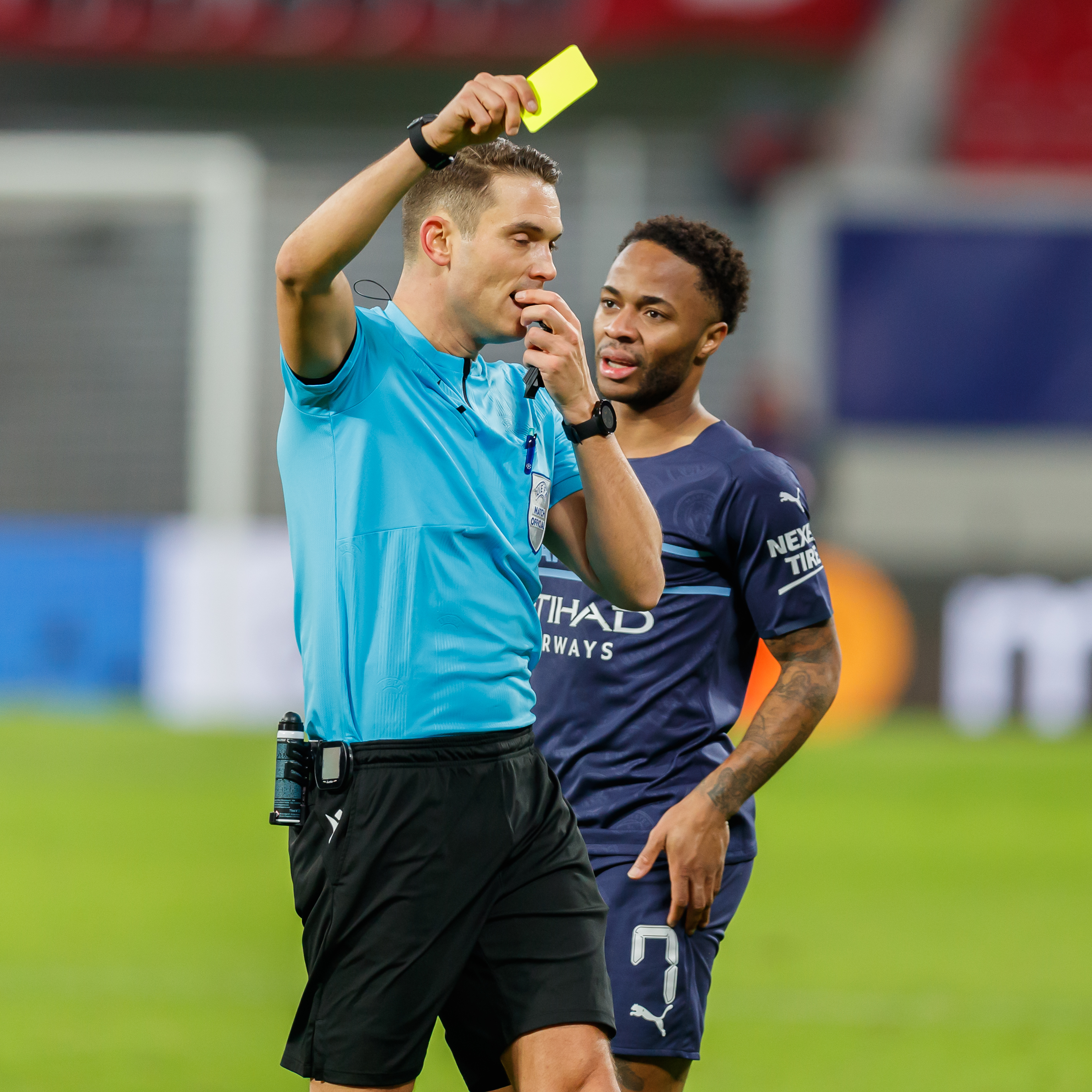
Sterling (right) playing for Manchester City in 2021

In the 2019 FA Community Shield against Liverpool on 4 August, Sterling scored the opening goal of the match in an eventual 1–1 draw; Manchester City ultimately won the title 5–4 on penalties. In Manchester City's opening game of the 2019–20 Premier League, Sterling scored a second-half hat-trick – his third of the calendar year – in a 5–0 away win over West Ham, which put them top of the table on goal difference after one game. On 22 October 2019, Sterling scored his first UEFA Champions League hat-trick in a 5–1 win over Atalanta in the group stages of the 2019–20 season. CIES ranked Sterling as the second most valuable player in the world after Kylian Mbappe, with a value of £173.6 million. Former Barcelona player Xavi suggested that Sterling was among four players who could succeed Lionel Messi as "the best player in the world". The Guardian ranked Sterling as 8th best player in the world for their 2019 list.

In February 2020, during an interview with Diario AS, Sterling was asked whether he would one day like to play for Real Madrid. In reply, Sterling said that "No one knows what the future will hold. I am a player and I am always open to challenges but right now my challenge is at City and I'm really happy".

On 11 July 2020, Sterling scored his third hat-trick of the season in a 5–0 away win against Brighton. He scored another three goals in the last three league games of the season, ending with a total of 20 goals, his best ever tally in the Premier League.

On 7 August 2020, he scored the opening goal in a 2–1 home victory against Real Madrid, knocking them out of the Champions League in the Round of 16. It was his 100th goal for City in all competitions, becoming the first Englishman to reach this figure for the club since Dennis Tueart in 1981. On 15 August 2020, Manchester City lost 3–1 against Lyon in the Champions League quarter-finals, in which Sterling missed an open goal chance to level the score, as it was 2–1 for Lyon.

==== 2020–2021: Champions League finalist ====
Sterling scored his first goals of the new campaign on 30 September 2020, scoring a brace in a 3–0 victory at Burnley in the EFL Cup. In the Citizens' next game on 3 October, he scored his first Premier League goal of the season against Leeds United in a 1–1 away draw, and added another in the following match two weeks later against Arsenal, a 1–0 home win. He scored his first Champions League goal of the season in a 3–0 away victory against Marseille, also assisting İlkay Gündoğan's goal on 27 October.

He scored in three consecutive league matches at the start of 2021, registering a goal and an assist at West Bromwich Albion on 26 January, and goals at back-to-back trips to Burnley and former club Liverpool in February. His goal against the Reds was his 100th goal with Manchester City under Pep Guardiola in all competitions. He also scored again against Arsenal on 21 February, which became his fifth goal in six games against the Gunners. On 29 May, he was named in the starting line-up in the 2021 UEFA Champions League final, where Manchester City lost 1–0 to Chelsea.

==== 2021–2022: Final season ====
Sterling opened his account for the 2021–22 season against Norwich City in a 5–0 home victory, on 21 August 2021. On 3 November, he scored his first Champions League goal of the season in a 4–1 win against Club Brugge, before scoring again in the next Champions League game against Paris-Saint Germain, a 2–1 win on 24 November.

In December, Sterling would go on to score in four consecutive matches in the Premier League, scoring against Watford and Newcastle United away, Wolves and Leicester City at home, the latter of which being a brace. These goals helped him join the Premier League 100 Club and win the Premier League Player of the Month award for December 2021.

On 12 February 2022, Sterling scored his fifth Premier League hat-trick against Norwich City in a 4–0 away win. With his goal in a 5–0 UEFA Champions League round of 16 first leg away win against Sporting CP three days later, Sterling entered into the top ten of all-time Manchester City goalscorers. On 8 May, he scored two goals against Newcastle United in a 5–0 home victory, before three days later scoring again in a 5–1 win at Wolves, in what would be his final goals for the club.

=== Chelsea ===
==== 2022–2024: First two seasons ====
On 13 July 2022, Sterling signed for Chelsea on a five-year contract for a fee of £47.5 million. On 6 August, he made his club debut in a 1–0 away win against Everton. On 27 August, Sterling scored his first goals for the club, a brace, in a 2–1 win over Leicester City, and added another in the next match against Southampton, a 2–1 away loss. He scored his first Champions League goal of the season under newly-appointed Graham Potter on 14 September, in a 1–1 home draw against RB Salzburg.

On 7 March 2023, Sterling scored against Borussia Dortmund in the second leg of Chelsea's round of 16 tie, in which the Blues' would win 2–0 at home, helping them advance to the quarter finals. On 13 May he scored a brace against Nottingham Forest in a 2–2 home draw.

On 25 August 2023, Sterling scored his first goal in the 2023–24 season and later scored a brace in the second half against Luton Town which ended in 3–0 win for Chelsea.

In late August 2024, Sterling's future with the club was cast into doubt when new manager Enzo Maresca made clear he did not want the player. "I spoke with Raheem ... I said that he is going to struggle to get minutes with us".

==== 2024–2026: Loan to Arsenal and Chelsea exile ====
On 30 August 2024, Sterling joined Arsenal on loan for the 2024–25 season. He made his first start for the club on 25 September and scored the fourth goal of a 5–1 victory over Bolton Wanderers in the third round of the EFL Cup. On 4 June 2025, it was announced he would return to Chelsea, having failed to make a major impact under Mikel Arteta. Upon returning to Stamford Bridge, Sterling was completely exiled from the squad, being forced to train separately and barred from the main club facilities. On 28 January 2026, Sterling departed Chelsea by mutual agreement.

=== Feyenoord ===
On 12 February 2026, Sterling signed for Eredivisie club Feyenoord until the end of the 2025–26 season. He obtained his work and residence permit on 19 February 2026. Prior to that, Feyenoord moved their training sessions to Belgium for three days to allow Sterling to join the team. Sterling made his debut for the club on 22 February 2026, replacing Gijs Smal during a 2–1 league win against Telstar. He made his first start for the club during a 3–3 draw with NAC Breda on 8 March 2026. He was not offered a contract extension at the end of the season and thus left the club.

== International career ==
=== Youth teams ===
Sterling was born in Jamaica and moved to England at a young age, and holds dual nationality. His international career coincided with the introduction of the "home nations agreement." It was not until September 2009 that FIFA agreed to the proposals by the English, Northern Irish, Scottish and Welsh Football Associations to update the agreement, allowing players who were educated in their nation for five years or more to become eligible for their national team. Sterling first represented England at under-16 level in November 2009 in a match against Northern Ireland. When speaking of the possibility of playing for Jamaica, Sterling said, "When it comes to that decision, that is when I will decide, but if Jamaica calls for me, why not?"

Sterling was selected to play for England for the 2011 U-17 World Cup. He scored a long-range goal in England's opening 2–0 win against Rwanda in Pachuca. He also scored against Argentina in the second round in a match where England won 4–2 on penalties. In early October 2012 he was called up for the first time to the England under-21 squad and made his debut as a substitute during a match against Serbia on 16 October. He scored his first goal for England U21 on 13 August 2013, in a 6–0 win against Scotland.

=== Senior team ===
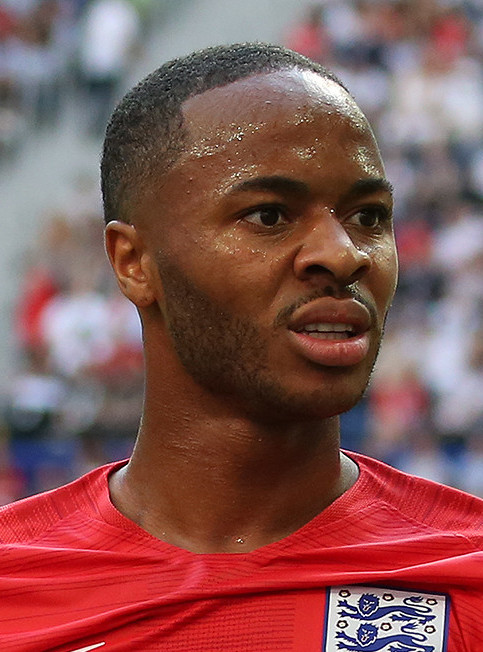
Sterling playing for England at the 2018 FIFA World Cup

On 10 September 2012, Sterling was called up to the senior England squad for the first time for a 2014 FIFA World Cup qualification match against Ukraine, where he was an unused substitute.

Sterling made his senior debut for England on 14 November 2012, starting in a friendly away to Sweden. On 5 March 2014, Sterling earned his second cap and was named man of the match as England beat Denmark 1–0 in a friendly match at Wembley Stadium.

On 12 May 2014, Sterling was named in England's 23-man squad for the 2014 FIFA World Cup. In a pre-tournament friendly on 4 June, against Ecuador in Miami on his fourth cap, Sterling slid into Antonio Valencia, who reacted by grabbing Sterling's neck; both received red cards for their actions. Valencia later apologised for his reaction. On 14 June, Sterling started in England's opening group match, a 2–1 loss to Italy in Manaus, and was rated as the team's best performing player by the BBC.

On 27 March 2015, Sterling scored his first senior goal for England in a 4–0 UEFA Euro 2016 qualifier against Lithuania at Wembley Stadium. On 9 October 2015, Sterling scored his second goal of the qualifying campaign in a 2–0 victory against Estonia, by which point the team were already qualified. He was one of 23 players chosen for the final tournament.

He was named in the 23-man England national team squad for the 2018 FIFA World Cup.

After a run of 27 games without a goal for England, Sterling scored twice in a UEFA Nations League group game against Spain on 15 October 2018. England went on to win the match 3–2.

Sterling scored his first hat-trick for England on 22 March 2019 in a 5–0 win over the Czech Republic at Wembley Stadium in a UEFA Euro 2020 qualifier.

In October 2019, Sterling scored a brace in a 6–0 defeat of Bulgaria. Sterling's first goal in the game meant that he equalled a record held jointly by Eric Brook and Francis Lee of the most England goals scored by a Manchester City player (10). Sterling's second goal in the game meant that he became the sole record holder in this respect (although his second goal in the game was his twelfth England goal overall, it was his eleventh as a Manchester City player).

In November 2019, Sterling was dropped from the England team after clashing with international teammate but club rival Joe Gomez.

On 13 June 2021, Sterling scored the only goal against Croatia to kick off England's UEFA Euro 2020 campaign with a winning start. On 22 June, he also scored the only goal in a 1–0 win over the Czech Republic to help England finish top of Group D. On 29 June, he scored the first goal against Germany in the round of 16. England won the game 2–0 and progressed to the quarter-finals. On 7 July, during England's semi-final game against Denmark, Sterling won a penalty in extra-time when the score was 1–1. He was accused of diving in this incident by former player Dietmar Hamann and on social media. The penalty was saved, but the rebound was scored by Harry Kane, for England to progress to the final.

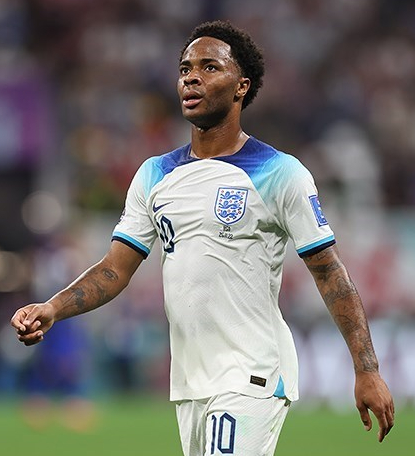
Sterling playing for England at the 2022 FIFA World Cup

On 21 November 2022, Sterling scored England's third goal in the opening game for England at the 2022 FIFA World Cup in a 6–2 win against Iran. On 4 December, Sterling left the England World Cup squad in Qatar to return to London after armed intruders broke into his home while his family were in. However, he returned to England's squad prior to the quarter-final match against France; the match, a 2–1 loss.

== Style of play ==
Sterling plays as a winger, attacking midfielder or striker. He has been praised for his adaptability and ability to play wide, at the tip of a midfield diamond and centrally, offering flexibility. Known at his peak for his pace, low centre of gravity, and dribbling skills, Sterling was compared to Alexis Sánchez by his former manager Brendan Rodgers. Rodgers also praised him for offering a "real threat," his use of pace with composure and his maturity. Despite his small stature, he also possesses considerable upper-body strength, which aids him in withstanding challenges, and retaining possession.

Former Barcelona midfielder Xavi said in November 2014 that Sterling was at the time good enough to play for the La Liga club, praising his physical and technical qualities. In April 2015, BBC Sport columnist Phil McNulty wrote that Sterling was "very good with the potential to be outstanding" but remained a "work in progress" due to inconsistent performances. He also wrote, "He is blessed with natural pace that makes even the best defences and defenders take a step back."

== Personal life ==
Sterling has three children: a daughter, born in 2012, and two sons, born in 2017 and 2019. His middle-name Shaquille comes from his grandmother, who was living in America at the time and wanted to name him after Shaquille O'Neal.

In 2013, citing the influence of his mother, Sterling was quoted as saying he was "not 100 per cent religious but my belief is strong. When the time is right, I will fully be Christian." He added that he put his faith in God and that he prays regularly.

On 8 August 2013, Sterling was arrested for an alleged common assault on his former girlfriend, a model. He was found not guilty at Liverpool Magistrates Court on 20 September, when the complainant was unable to offer consistent evidence. A few months earlier, on 20 May 2013, a charge of common assault on a different woman was dropped after a witness failed to attend court.

In April 2015, Sterling was photographed by the Sunday Mirror allegedly smoking a shisha pipe, and by The Sun allegedly inhaling nitrous oxide for recreational purposes. Manager Brendan Rodgers said, "I don't think it is something you should be doing, it's as simple as that... Young players make mistakes. As long as they learn from them, that is what is important."

In June 2017, following the Grenfell Tower fire in which 72 people died, Sterling made a substantial donation to those affected by the fire.

On 16 December 2017, Sterling was attacked outside Manchester City's training ground by a man who used racist language towards him. Four days later, 29-year-old Karl Anderson, a convicted football hooligan, pleaded guilty to racially aggravated common assault and was sentenced to 16 weeks in prison and a £100 fine. The Guardian praised Sterling's resilience and courage in deciding to play only four hours afterwards.

Sterling has an M16 rifle tattooed on his leg for which he received criticism from Harry Redknapp and anti-violence groups; in response Sterling said that the tattoo had deeper meaning and referred to his father who was killed when Sterling was two years old. There has been criticism of how the British tabloid media, such as The Sun, cover and treat Sterling with some articles being deemed unfair and racist by pundits including Ian Wright.

Sterling has been named as one of the 100 most influential Black Britons, with his inclusion in the annual Powerlist in both the 2020 and 2021 editions.

Sterling was appointed Member of the Order of the British Empire (MBE) in the 2021 Birthday Honours for services to racial equality in sport.

In November 2021, Sterling launched his own charitable foundation at the Ark Elvin Academy, his former school. The Raheem Sterling Foundation will 'educate, empower and inspire young people to become better prepared for the future and to embrace opportunities to achieve greater social mobility.' Speaking at the launch, Sterling said: "My foundation is built on my experiences, successes and the many challenges I overcame, I now want to help young people achieve and be the best they can be."

In 2021, Sterling established his own clothing brand, named 1692. The brand was associated with many community outreach programs headlined by Sterling. However, in 2025 the brand was legally dissolved after financial struggles and posting losses of more than one million pounds.

As of 2022, Sterling lived in a gated property in Oxshott, Surrey. During the 2022 Qatar World Cup Sterling's house was burgled. This was discovered by his fiancée and children when they returned from being with him in Qatar. As a result of the burglary, Sterling flew home, while the FIFA World Cup was still underway. He later re-joined the team for training.

In May 2026, Sterling was arrested on suspicion of drug-driving after crashing his Lamborghini Urus into barriers on the M3 motorway. He was released on bail pending further enquiries. In September at Basingstoke Magistrates' Court, he admitted the offence of dangerous driving, as well as possessing nitrous oxide for wrongful inhalation and failing to provide a specimen for analysis. Having been disqualified from driving in the interim, he is due to appear in court again on 25 November 2026.

== Sponsorship ==
In 2012, Sterling signed a sponsorship deal with American sportswear and equipment supplier Nike. He appeared in an advertisement for the new Nike Green Speed II alongside Mario Götze, Theo Walcott, Eden Hazard, Christian Eriksen and Stephan El Shaarawy in November 2012. In January 2013, he modelled the new Nike Mercurial Vapor IX. Starting in 2020, Sterling became an ambassador for Gillette, appearing in UK adverts for the brand. In May 2021 he announced that he signed multi-year deal with New Balance; he will be wearing the Furon v6+ boots.

== Career statistics ==
=== Club ===
As of match played 17 May 2026

Appearances and goals by club, season and competition
Club	Season	League			National cup (Note: Includes FA Cup)		League cup (Note: Includes Football League Cup/EFL Cup)		Continental		Other		Total	
Club	Season	Division	Apps	Goals	Apps	Goals	Apps	Goals	Apps	Goals	Apps	Goals	Apps	Goals
Liverpool	2011–12	Premier League	3	0	0	0	0	0	—		—		3	0
Liverpool	2012–13	Premier League	24	2	1	0	1	0	10 (Note: Appearances in UEFA Europa League)	0	—		36	2
Liverpool	2013–14	Premier League	33	9	3	0	2	1	—		—		38	10
Liverpool	2014–15	Premier League	35	7	5	1	4	3	8 (Note: Six appearances in UEFA Champions League, two appearances in UEFA Europa League)	0	—		52	11
Liverpool	Total		95	18	9	1	7	4	18	0	—		129	23
Manchester City	2015–16	Premier League	31	6	2	1	4	1	10 (Note: Appearances in UEFA Champions League)	3	—		47	11
Manchester City	2016–17	Premier League	33	7	5	1	1	0	8	2	—		47	10
Manchester City	2017–18	Premier League	33	18	2	1	3	0	8	4	—		46	23
Manchester City	2018–19	Premier League	34	17	4	3	3	0	10	5	0	0	51	25
Manchester City	2019–20	Premier League	33	20	4	1	5	3	9	6	1 (Note: Appearance in FA Community Shield)	1	52	31
Manchester City	2020–21	Premier League	31	10	3	1	4	2	11	1	—		49	14
Manchester City	2021–22	Premier League	30	13	3	1	2	0	12	3	0	0	47	17
Manchester City	Total		225	91	23	9	22	6	68	24	1	1	339	131
Chelsea	2022–23	Premier League	28	6	0	0	1	0	9	3	—		38	9
Chelsea	2023–24	Premier League	31	8	6	1	6	1	—		—		43	10
Chelsea	Total		59	14	6	1	7	1	9	3	0	0	81	19
Arsenal (loan)	2024–25	Premier League	17	0	1	0	4	1	6	0	—		28	1
Feyenoord	2025–26	Eredivisie	8	0	—		—		—		—		8	0
Career total			404	123	39	11	40	12	101	27	1	1	585	174

=== International ===
Appearances and goals by national team and year
National team	Year	Apps	Goals
England	2012	1	0
England	2013	0	0
England	2014	12	0
England	2015	7	2
England	2016	9	0
England	2017	6	0
England	2018	12	2
England	2019	9	8
England	2020	2	1
England	2021	14	5
England	2022	10	2
Total		82	20

England score listed first, score column indicates score after each Sterling goal

List of international goals scored by Raheem Sterling
No.	Date	Venue	Cap	Opponent	Score	Result	Competition	Ref.
1	27 March 2015	Wembley Stadium, London, England	14	Lithuania	3–0	4–0	UEFA Euro 2016 qualifying	
2	9 October 2015	Wembley Stadium, London, England	18	Estonia	2–0	2–0	UEFA Euro 2016 qualifying	
3	15 October 2018	Estadio Benito Villamarín, Seville, Spain	46	Spain	1–0	3–2	2018–19 UEFA Nations League A	
4	15 October 2018	Estadio Benito Villamarín, Seville, Spain	46	Spain	3–0	3–2	2018–19 UEFA Nations League A	
5	22 March 2019	Wembley Stadium, London, England	48	Czech Republic	1–0	5–0	UEFA Euro 2020 qualifying	
6	22 March 2019	Wembley Stadium, London, England	48	Czech Republic	3–0	5–0	UEFA Euro 2020 qualifying	
7	22 March 2019	Wembley Stadium, London, England	48	Czech Republic	4–0	5–0	UEFA Euro 2020 qualifying	
8	25 March 2019	Podgorica City Stadium, Podgorica, Montenegro	49	Montenegro	5–1	5–1	UEFA Euro 2020 qualifying	
9	7 September 2019	Wembley Stadium, London, England	52	Bulgaria	3–0	4–0	UEFA Euro 2020 qualifying	
10	10 September 2019	St Mary's Stadium, Southampton, England	53	Kosovo	1–1	5–3	UEFA Euro 2020 qualifying	
11	14 October 2019	Vasil Levski National Stadium, Sofia, Bulgaria	55	Bulgaria	4–0	6–0	UEFA Euro 2020 qualifying	
12	14 October 2019	Vasil Levski National Stadium, Sofia, Bulgaria	55	Bulgaria	5–0	6–0	UEFA Euro 2020 qualifying	
13	5 September 2020	Laugardalsvöllur, Reykjavík, Iceland	57	Iceland	1–0	1–0	2020–21 UEFA Nations League A	
14	25 March 2021	Wembley Stadium, London, England	59	San Marino	3–0	5–0	2022 FIFA World Cup qualification	
15	13 June 2021	Wembley Stadium, London, England	62	Croatia	1–0	1–0	UEFA Euro 2020	
16	22 June 2021	Wembley Stadium, London, England	64	Czech Republic	1–0	1–0	UEFA Euro 2020	
17	29 June 2021	Wembley Stadium, London, England	65	Germany	1–0	2–0	UEFA Euro 2020	
18	2 September 2021	Puskás Aréna, Budapest, Hungary	69	Hungary	1–0	4–0	2022 FIFA World Cup qualification	
19	29 March 2022	Wembley Stadium, London, England	74	Ivory Coast	2–0	3–0	Friendly	
20	21 November 2022	Khalifa International Stadium, Doha, Qatar	80	Iran	3–0	6–2	2022 FIFA World Cup	

== Honours ==
Manchester City

- Premier League: 2017–18, 2018–19, 2020–21, 2021–22
- FA Cup: 2018–19
- Football League/EFL Cup: 2015–16, 2017–18, 2018–19, 2019–20, 2020–21
- FA Community Shield: 2019
- UEFA Champions League runner-up: 2020–21

Chelsea

- EFL Cup runner-up: 2023–24

England

- UEFA European Championship runner-up: 2020
- UEFA Nations League third place: 2018–19

Individual

- Liverpool Young Player of the Season: 2013–14, 2014–15
- Golden Boy: 2014
- UEFA Champions League Team of the Group Stage: 2015–16
- UEFA Champions League Squad of the Season: 2018–19, 2019–20
- Premier League Player of the Month: August 2016, November 2018, December 2021
- PFA Team of the Year: 2018–19 Premier League
- PFA Young Player of the Year: 2018–19
- FWA Footballer of the Year: 2018–19
- Sports Illustrated Premier League Team of the Decade: 2010–2019
- UEFA European Championship Team of the Tournament: 2020

Orders

- Member of the Order of the British Empire: 2021
