= Albert Davies =

Albert Davies may refer to:

- Albert Davies (politician) (1900–1953), British Labour Party politician, MP 1945–1953
- Albert Davies (EastEnders), a minor character in the BBC soap EastEnders
- Albert Thomas Davies (1869–1940), Shrewsbury Town F.C. and Wales international footballer
- Albert Emil Davies (1875–1950), British politician and writer

== See also ==
- Albert Davis (disambiguation)
- Al Davies (disambiguation)
