= Sol Encel =

Australian academic (1925–2010)

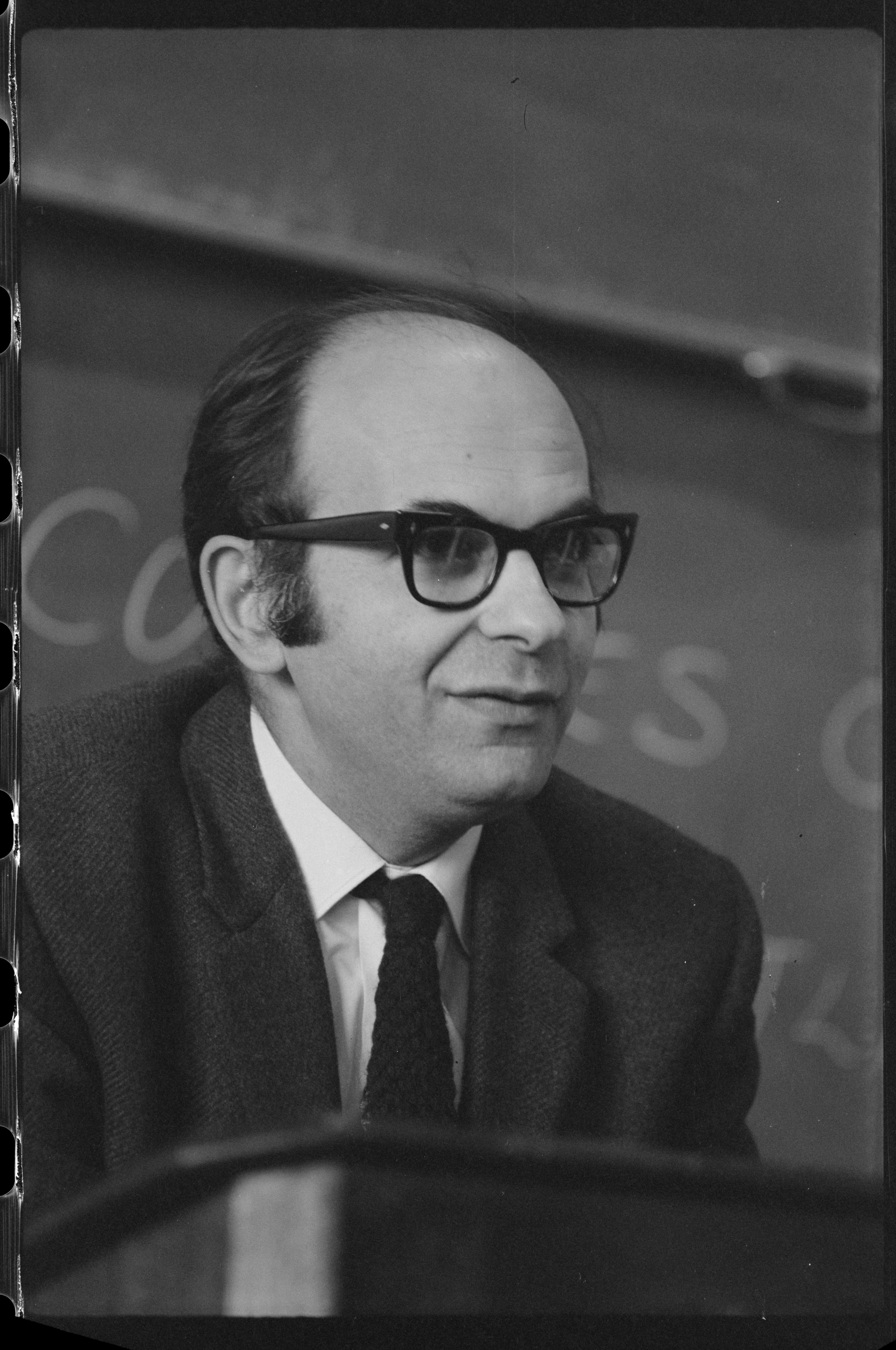
- Born: 3 March 1925
- Died: 23 July 2010 (aged 85)

Education
- Education: University of Melbourne (PhD)

Philosophical work
- Institutions: University of New South Wales (1966–1990), Australian National University, Canberra (1956–1966), University of Melbourne
- Main interests: sociology and political science

Solomon Encel (3 March 1925 – 23 July 2010) was a noted Jewish-Australian academic, sociologist and political scientist.

He received an M.A. (1952) and Ph.D. (1960), both from the University of Melbourne. He was Professor of Sociology at the University of New South Wales (1966–1990), Senior Lecturer and Reader in Political Science at the Australian National University, Canberra (1956–1966), and Tutor and Lecturer in Political Science at the University of Melbourne (1952–1955).

He was the author of numerous books and articles, particularly including two landmark books, Australian Society (1965, with Alan Davies) and Equality and Authority in Australia (1970).
