= Bertie Davis (footballer) =

English footballer

Personal information
- Full name: Herbert Alfred Davis
- Date of birth: 30 March 1897
- Place of birth: Arnold, England
- Date of death: 1973 (aged 75–76)
- Position: Inside forward

Senior career*
Years	Team	Apps	(Gls)
1914–1915	Arnold St Mary's		
1919–1921	Nottingham Forest	20	(7)
1921–1923	Boston Town		
1923–1925	Reading	33	(8)
1925–1927	Mansfield Town		
1927	Arnold Wesleyans		
Total		53	(15)
- * Club domestic league appearances and goals

Herbert Alfred Davis (30 March 1897 – 1973) was an English footballer who played in the Football League for Nottingham Forest and Reading.
