= Phlebology (journal) =

- Discipline: Vascular diseases
- Language: English
- Edited by: Alun Davies

Publication details
- History: 1986-present
- Publisher: SAGE Publications on behalf of the Royal Society of Medicine
- Frequency: 10/year
- Impact factor: 1.458 (2012)

Standard abbreviations
- ISO 4: Phlebology

Indexing
- CODEN: PHLEEF
- ISSN: 0268-3555 (print); 1758-1125 (web)
- OCLC no.: 22304962

Links
- Journal homepage; Online access; Online archive

Phlebology, The Journal of Venous Disease, is a peer-reviewed medical journal covering research on vascular disease. It is published by SAGE Publications and is an official journal of the American College of Phlebology, the Australasian College of Phlebology, the Venous Forum of the Royal Society of Medicine, the European Venous Forum, and the Benelux Society. The editor-in-chief is Alun Davies.

== Abstracting and indexing ==
The journal is abstracted and indexed in PubMed/MEDLINE and the Science Citation Index. According to the Journal Citation Reports, the journal has a 2012 impact factor of 1.458, ranking it 47th out of 67 listed journals in the category "Peripheral Vascular Disease".
