= Al Davies =

Al Davies may refer to:

- Alun Davies (disambiguation)
- Alan Davies (disambiguation)
- Albert Davies (disambiguation)

== See also ==
- Al Davis (disambiguation)
