= Herbert Davies =

English physician

Herbert Davies (1818–1885) was an English physician.

== Life ==
The son of Dr. Thomas Davies, he was born in London 30 September 1818. After education at North End House School, Hampstead, he obtained a scholarship at Gonville and Caius College, Cambridge, in 1838, but migrated to Queens' College, and graduated B.A. as thirty-first wrangler in 1842. In 1843 he took the degree of M.B., was elected a Fellow of Queens' College in 1844, and graduated M.D. in 1848. He studied medicine in Paris, Vienna, and London.

Davies was on 5 August 1845 elected assistant-physician to the London Hospital. In 1850 he was elected a fellow of the Royal College of Physicians, and in 1854 physician to the London Hospital, a post he held for twenty years. He lectured in the medical school there on materia medica, and then on medicine. At Cambridge he was examiner for medical degrees and assessor to the regius professor of physic.

Davies lived in Finsbury Square, London, was physician to the Bank of England, and had a considerable practice. He died at Hampstead 4 January 1885, and was buried in the cemetery there.

== Works ==
Davies's thesis was On the Origin of Gout. Besides papers in the London Hospital Reports and in the Transactions of the Pathological Society, he published a manual Lectures on the Physical Diagnosis of the Diseases of the Lungs and Heart, London, 1851, which reached a second edition in 1854, and was translated into German and Dutch; and On the Treatment of Rheumatic Fever in its Acute Stage, exclusively by free Blistering, London, 1864. Papers on the form and areas of the heart's orifices are in the Proceedings of the Royal Society, 1870 and 1872.

== Family ==
Davies married Caroline Templar Wyatt on 24 Aug. 1850. They had seven children, and his second son Arthur T. Davies graduated in medicine at Cambridge and became a physician.

== Notes ==
Attribution

This article incorporates text from a publication now in the public domain: Stephen, Leslie, ed. (1888). "Davies, Herbert". Dictionary of National Biography. Vol. 14. London: Smith, Elder & Co.
