= Albert Davis =

Albert Davis may refer to:

- Albert Davis (baseball), Negro league baseball player
- Albert Davis; see Doug Dickey
- Albert Davis Park

== See also ==
- Bert Davis (disambiguation)
- Al Davis (disambiguation)
- Albert Davies (disambiguation)
