= Alan Fraser Davies =

(1924–1987) political scientist

Alan Fraser "Foo" Davies (25 September 1924 – 18 August 1987) was an Australian political scientist and author, known for his quip that Australians have a "talent for bureaucracy" and for his work on the relation between bureaucracy and public service. A professor at the University of Melbourne, Davies wrote a series of highly influential books on Australian politics.

== Notable works ==
- Australian Democracy: An Introduction to the Political System (1958)
- A Sunday Kind of Love (1961), a collection of short stories
- Australian Society: A Sociological Introduction (1965), edited with Sol Encel
- Private Politics: A Study of Five Political Outlooks (1966)
- Images of Class: An Australian Study (1967)
- Essays in Political Sociology (1972).
- Skills, Outlooks, and Passions: A Psychoanalytic Contribution to the Study of Politics (1980)
- The Human Element: Three Essays in Political Psychology (1988)
