= Alan Davies (mathematician) =

British professor emeritus of mathematics

- Born: 22 December 1945 (age 80); United Kingdom
- Education: University of Southampton, Imperial College
- Spouse: Dr Diane Crann
- Scientific career
- Thesis: Aspects of the boundary integral equation method and its implementation on a distributed array processor (1989)
- Doctoral advisor: Dr Mike Bernal

Alan Davies (born 22 December 1945) is a British professor emeritus of mathematics at the University of Hertfordshire.

He obtained a first class honours degree in mathematics (1968) from Southampton University. He followed that with a master's degree, with distinction, in structural engineering (1974) and a doctorate in numerical computation (1989) from Imperial College. He has spent most of his working life as an academic at the University of Hertfordshire (UH), formerly the Hatfield Polytechnic. He had short spells in industry working as a research engineer in the aircraft industry and as a process engineer in the food industry.

During his time in Hatfield his major activity has been teaching mathematics to undergraduates and postgraduates in mathematics, science and engineering. He has also been engaged in research in numerical computation. In 1992 he became Head of the Department of Mathematics and was appointed Professor of Mathematics and, in 2004, the department merged with Physical Sciences and Davies was appointed head of the School of Physics, Astronomy and Mathematics. During his time as head of the department he became increasingly involved with outreach activities with both schools and the general public. He retired from his full-time post in 2006 and is currently Professor Emeritus in mathematics and a London Mathematical Society Holgate Lecturer. His particular interest in teaching is in applied mathematics and numerical computation, particularly to students for whom mathematics is not their main subject, in particular engineering.

In 1991, in collaboration with Ros Crouch, he was awarded the British Nuclear Fuels Partnership Award for Innovative Teaching in Mathematics, in recognition of their undergraduate module in which mathematical modelling was used as a vehicle for the teaching and learning of communication skills. He was a member of the Mew Group which produced materials suitable for teachers to use with sixth formers to consider problems different from the rather idealised versions found in their usual text books. He has also worked with the Open University (OU) as a part-time tutor; he retained that position until 2012 and still teaches in summer schools and mathematics revision weekends.

His research interest is in the area of numerical computation. He collaborated with his wife, Dr Diane Crann, for 15 years developing boundary element solutions to diffusion and heat-conduction problems. They are particularly interested in the use of the Laplace transform and domain decomposition approaches. The two of them co-wrote "A Handbook of Essential Mathematical Formulae" intended for students of mathematics and related fields.

Since his retirement he has concentrated on outreach activities, working with his wife to present masterclasses in mathematics and physical science in collaboration with the Royal Institution (Ri). Over the past twenty years they have both became heavily involved with the Ri and its masterclass programme, she as Clothworkers’ Fellow in Mathematics and Manager of the Masterclass Programme (2010–2015), and he as a trustee (2009–2015).

== Bibliography ==
- A. J. Davies (1980). The finite element method: a first approach. Oxford University Press. ISBN 0-19-859-630-8.
- A. J. Davies (1982). The finite element method: a first approach - Japanese edition. Oxford University Press. ISBN 4-7819-0403-3.
- Alan J. Davies (1992). Waves. Macmillan. ISBN 0-333-54112-X.
- A. J. Davies (2011). The finite element method: an introduction with partial differential equations (2 ed.). Oxford University Press. ISBN 978-0-19-960913-0.
- Alan Davies and Diane Crann (2005). A Handbook of Essential Mathematical Formulae. University of Hertfordshire Press. ISBN 1-902806-41-7.
- Alan Davies and Diane Crann (2008). A Handbook of Essential Mathematical Formulae (2 ed.). University of Hertfordshire Press. ISBN 978-1-902806-41-9.
- Alan Davies and Philip Samuels (1996). An Introduction to Computational Geometry for Curves and Surfaces. Oxford University Press. ISBN 0-19-853695-X.
- J. A. P. Hall - Gordon Spencer-Brand and Alan Davies eds (2009). Computers in education II. University of Hertfordshire Press. ISBN 978-1-905313-82-2.
