= Ark Elvin Academy =

Location
- Cecil Avenue; Wembley, London, HA9 7DU; England; 51°33′10″N 0°17′24″W

Information
- Type: Academy
- Local authority: Brent
- Department for Education URN: 141019 Tables
- Ofsted: Reports
- Acting Principal: Peter Cook
- Gender: Mixed
- Age: 11 to 18
- Enrolment: 939 as of January 2015
- Website: http://arkelvinacademy.org/

Ark Elvin Academy (formerly Copland Community School) is a mixed secondary school and sixth form located in Wembley area of the London Borough of Brent. 92% of students are of minority ethnic origin, 36% qualify for free school meals, and over 50 different languages are spoken by students.

== History ==
=== Copland Community School ===
Copland School was rebuilt on the site of the old Wembley Hill School, and opened in 1951 under Headmaster Mr G.W. Dakin. Later, as Copland Community School, a foundation school administered by Brent Borough Council, the school was led by Alan Davies as its headmaster for more than twenty years from 1988. Speaking in Davies' defence at his later trial, his barrister said that in that time he had led the school "from the very bottom to very near the top"—the school had been on the verge of being closed for poor performance when he took over. Davies was knighted in 2000, and Dr Richard Evans, a deputy head at the school, received an MBE for services to education in 2003.

Davies received £130,960 bonus in two years on top of his salary. This took his annual salary to more than £160,000. As a result, the teachers at Copland declared a vote of no confidence in him, and threatened strike action after three teachers were suspended for revealing details of the bonuses to the media.

==== Staff suspensions and criminal trial ====
In 2009, Davies, Evans, and school bursar Columbus Udokoro, were all suspended due to "serious" allegations about pay and bonuses. The suspensions came after a former Copland teacher and union representative claimed that almost £1m had been paid in bonuses to the senior management team at the school over the preceding seven years. Children's Secretary Ed Balls spoke of his "grave concerns" about the allegations and said he was pleased that officials had acted "swiftly and decisively". Balls sacked the entire governing body of the school, including its chairman, Dr Indravadan Patel, who had publicly supported some of the bonuses.

Philip O’Hear, headteacher of Capital City Academy, in Doyle Gardens, Willesden, was appointed acting headteacher during the investigation. Davies subsequently resigned his post and Evans was dismissed. Both of their cases were referred to the General Teaching Council.

In October 2013 Davies received a suspended jail sentence at Southwark Crown Court when he pleaded guilty to creating a false paper trail on bonus payment and allowances; prosecutors dropped additional charges of conspiracy to defraud. Evans, Udokoro, Patel and two others were also formally cleared of all charges. In May 2014 it was announced in the London Gazette that Davies had been stripped of his knighthood.

=== Ark Elvin Academy ===
Previously a foundation school administered by Brent London Borough Council, Copland Community School was converted to academy status on 1 September 2014 and was renamed Ark Elvin Academy. The school is now sponsored by Ark, but continues to coordinate with Brent London Borough Council for admissions. In 2019 the school was rated as good by Ofsted.

== Notable former pupils ==
=== Copland Community SchoolAnd Ark Elvin academy ===
- Kerrea Gilbert, footballer
- Raheem Sterling, current Feyenoord and former England national football team footballer
- Shaun Wallace, barrister, lecturer and television personality
- K Koke, rapper from Stonebridge, North West London
- Brian Strange, 1976 Montreal Olympic Games Competitor.
