= Alun Davies =

Alun Davies may refer to:

- Alun Davies (politician) (born 1964), Welsh politician
- Alun Davies (guitarist) (born 1943), guitarist frequently associated with Cat Stevens
- Alun Davies (sailor) (born 1963), Caymanian sailor
- Alun Talfan Davies (1913–2000), Welsh judge and publisher
- Alun Davies (biologist) (born 1955), Welsh biologist
- Alun Davies (historian) (1916–1980), Welsh historian
- Alun Davies (priest) (1923–2003), Welsh Anglican priest
- Alun Davies (rugby union) (born 1956), Welsh rugby union player
- Alun Wyn Davies, Welsh rugby union footballer
- Alun Herbert Davies (1927–2005), Welsh head teacher and director of the Welsh Books Council
- Alun Huw Davies (born 1960), Welsh professor of vascular surgery

== See also ==
- Alan Davies (disambiguation)
- Alan Davis (disambiguation)
- Al Davies (disambiguation)
