= Davies =

- Pronunciation: UK: /ˈdeɪvɪs/ DAY-vis; US: /ˈdeɪviːz/ DAY-veez
- Language: English

Origin
- Language: Welsh
- Region of origin: Wales

Other names
- Variant forms: Davis; Davison; Davey; Day

Davies is a patronymic Welsh surname meaning "son of David". It is the second most common surname in Wales, a rank it shares with "Williams", and the eighth most common surname in England, where many people have Welsh ancestry. It is particularly widespread in southwest England, especially Cornwall, and in the areas of northwest England that are near the border with Wales.

In the United States, the variant "Davis" is much more common. In the United Kingdom, the surname is usually pronounced the same as "Davis". This pronunciation is also used by many other English-speaking countries, though it sometimes competes with the common American pronunciation to distinguish it from "Davis.

There are two main theories concerning the surname's origin, though neither have been proven. The first theory states that it may stem from the Kingdom of Dyfed, a medieval Welsh kingdom located in modern-day Carmarthenshire; however, the origin of the kingdom's name is itself disputed, with the most commonly accepted theories being that it was founded by the powerful Irish Déisi dynasty in the third century or that it otherwise derives from the name of the Demetae people. "Dyfed" as a surname and the related forename "Dafydd" appear from the 12th century, with the latter generally translated into English as "David". The second theory about the origin of "Davies" contends that it may derive directly from the Hebrew name "David", which is also the name of Wales' patron saint.

== Notable people with the surname ==
=== A ===
- Aaron Michael Davies (born 1984), American actor
- Adam Davies (disambiguation), multiple people
- A. Donald Davies (1920–2011), American Episcopal bishop
- Adrian Davies (rugby union) (born 1969), Welsh rugby footballer
- Adrienne Davies, American musician
- Alan Davies (disambiguation), multiple people
- Alec Davies (born 1962), Scottish cricketer
- Alex Davies (disambiguation), multiple people
- Alexandra Davies (born 1977), English-born Australian actress
- Alice Davies (1870 – after 1919), British suffragette and nurse
- Alphonso Davies (born 2000), Ghanaian-born Canadian soccer player
- Alfred Davies (disambiguation), multiple people
- Alun Davies (disambiguation), multiple people
- Amanda Davies (geographer), Australian geographer
- Andrew Davies (disambiguation), multiple people
- Anne Davies (disambiguation), or Ann Davies, multiple people
- Anthony Davies, Welsh snooker player
- Antony Davies, American economist
- Arthur Davies (disambiguation), multiple people
- Ashley Slanina-Davies, English actress

=== B ===
- Barbara Davies (1955–2002), English teacher and activist
- Barry Davies, English sports commentator
- Benjamin Davies (disambiguation), multiple people
- Bevan Davies, American drummer
- Billie Davies, American drummer
- Billy Davies, Scottish football manager
- Bob Davies, American basketball player
- Brandon Davies, American basketball player
- Brenda Davies (1917–2013), wife and literary executor of Robertson Davies
- Brian Davies, philosopher
- Brian Davies, birth name of British illustrator and cartoonist Michael ffolkes
- Bryan Davies (disambiguation), multiple people
- Bryn Davies (disambiguation), multiple people

=== C ===
- Caitlin Davies, English writer
- Callum Davies (disambiguation), multiple people
- Carrie Davies, British broadcaster
- Charles Lynn Davies, Wales rugby player
- Charlie Davies, American footballer
- Charlotte Davies, American model
- Chris Davies (disambiguation), multiple people
- Christopher Davies (disambiguation), multiple people
- Clara Novello Davies, Welsh singer, mother of Ivor Novello
- Clement Davies, British politician
- Clement L. Davies, Canadian Christian minister and Ku Klux Klan supporter
- Cliff Davies (disambiguation), multiple people
- Cooke Davies, Canadian politician
- Curtis Davies, English footballer
- Cyril Davies, English musician

=== D ===
- Dai Davies (disambiguation), multiple people
- Dan Davies (writer) (born 1970), British journalist
- Dangerous Davies, fictional character from The Last Detective
- Dave Davies (disambiguation), multiple people
- David Davies (disambiguation), multiple people
- Deddie Davies (1938–2016), Welsh character actress
- Denys Johnson-Davies, Canadian translator
- Denzil Davies, British politician
- Diana Davies (disambiguation), multiple people
- Dick Davies (1936–2012), American Olympic basketball player
- Dickie Davies (1928–2023), English television presenter
- Domenick Davies, German rugby union international
- Donald Davies (disambiguation), multiple people
- Douglas Arthur Davies (1896–1992), British military officer

=== E ===
- Ebenezer Thomas Davies (1903–1991), Welsh scholar and priest
- Edgar G. Davies (1898–1919), British World War I flying ace
- Ednyfed Hudson Davies (1929–2018), Welsh politician
- Edward Davies (disambiguation), multiple people
- Edwin Davies (1946–2018), British businessman and philanthropist
- Edwin Davies (publisher) (1859–1919), Welsh publisher and editor
- Ellis Davies (politician) (1871–1939), Welsh politician and lawyer
- Ellis Davies (priest) (1872–1962), Welsh priest and antiquarian
- Ellis Reginald Davies (1929–2009), Welsh footballer
- Ellis Thomas Davies (1822–1895), Welsh Independent minister
- Emiko Davies, Australian-born food writer
- Emily Davies, English feminist
- Eric Davies, South African cricketer
- Ernest Davies, multiple people
- Eva Davies (1924–2013), British fencer
- Evan Thomas Davies (1878–1969), Welsh composer

=== F ===
- Frances Davies (born 1996), New Zealand field hockey player
- Francis James Davies (1889–1941), British military aviator
- Frederick Davies (disambiguation), multiple people

=== G ===
- Gareth Davies (disambiguation), multiple people
- Garfield Davies, Baron Davies of Coity (1935–2019), British trade union leader
- Gary Davies (disambiguation), multiple people
- Gavyn Davies, British banker and past BBC chairman
- Gemma Davies (born 1991), English football manager
- Geoffrey Davies, English actor
- George Davies (disambiguation), multiple people
- Geraint Davies (disambiguation), multiple people
- Gerald Davies (born 1945), Welsh rugby player
- Gordon Leslie Herries Davies (1932–2019), British geographer and historian of geography and geology
- Grant Davies, Australian canoer
- Greg Davies, Welsh comedian
- Godfrey Davies, English historian
- Gwen Ffrangcon-Davies, English actress

=== H ===
- Harvey Davies (born 2003), English footballer
- Henry Davies (disambiguation), multiple people
- Hilary Davies (born 1954), English poet, critic and translator
- Hopkin Davies, Wales international rugby player
- Howard Davies (disambiguation), multiple people
- Hugh Sykes Davies (1909–1984), English poet and academic
- Hunter Davies (born 1936), Scottish writer
- Huw Irranca-Davies, British politician

=== I ===
- Ian Davies (disambiguation), multiple people
- Idris Davies, Welsh poet

=== J ===
- J. Glyn Davies, Welsh poet and scholar
- Jack Davies (disambiguation), several people
- Jack Llewelyn Davies, second eldest of the Llewelyn Davies boys befriended by Peter Pan creator J. M. Barrie
- Jackson Davies, Canadian actor
- Jacob G. Davies (1795–1857), American politician
- James Davies (disambiguation), multiple people
- Jane Davies (born 1963), British physician
- Jeremy Davies (exorcist), English Catholic priest
- Jeremy Davies, American actor
- Jérémy Davies, Canadian ice hockey player
- Jim Davies (disambiguation), multiple people
- Jimmy Davies (disambiguation), multiple people
- Joan Davies (1912–1982), concert pianist, wife of Ivor Walsworth
- Joanne Davies (born 1972), English badminton player
- Jocelyn Davies, Welsh politician
- Joe Davies (disambiguation)
- John Davies (disambiguation), multiple people
- Jon Davies, American meteorologist and storm chaser
- Jonathan Davies (disambiguation), multiple people
- Joseph Davies (disambiguation), multiple people
- Jude Davies, British academic

=== K ===
- Karl Davies, English television actor
- Kay Davies, English geneticist
- Ken Davies (disambiguation), multiple people
- Kevin Davies, English footballer
- Kevin Davies, British television director
- Kieron Davies, German rugby union player
- Kimberley Davies, Australian actress
- Kyle Davies, American baseball player
- Kyle Davies, American soccer player

=== L ===
- L. P. Davies (1914–1988), British novelist
- Lane Davies (born 1951), American actor
- Laura Davies (born 1963), English golfer
- Libby Davies (born 1953), Canadian politician
- Lilian May Davies (1915–2013), later Princess Lilian, Duchess of Halland
- Lindy Davies, Australian actress
- Llewelyn Davies (aviator) (1889–1918), Welsh World War I flying ace
- Llewellyn Price-Davies (1878–1965), British general
- Lorys Davies, British Anglican priest
- Louis Henry Davies (1845–1924), Canadian politician
- Luke Davies (born 1962), Australian writer
- Lyndal Davies (born 1967), Australian wildlife documentary maker
- Lynn Davies (born 1942), Welsh athlete

=== M ===
- M. C. Davies (1835–1913), Australian businessman
- Mandy Rice-Davies (1944–2014), Welsh model
- Marcus Davies (born 1991), Australian rules footballer
- Marianne Davies, English musician
- Marion Davies (1897–1961), American actress
- Mark Davies (disambiguation), multiple people
- Marshall Davies (born 1930), Rhodesian cricketer
- Martin Davies (disambiguation), multiple people
- Mary Elizabeth Davies (1925–2015), Welsh chess master
- Matthew Davies (disambiguation), multiple people
- Mervyn Davies (disambiguation), multiple people
- Michael Davies (disambiguation), multiple people
- Mike Davies (disambiguation), multiple people
- Mims Davies (born 1975), British Conservative politician, MP for Eastleigh from 2015 to 2019
- Morgan Davies (born 2001), Australian actor
- A. Morley Davies (1869–1959), British paleontologist

=== N ===
- Nicholas Barry Davies, British ethologist, ornithologist and professor at the University of Cambridge
- Nicholas Llewelyn Davies, see Llewelyn Davies
- Nick Davies, British journalist
- Nicola Davies (disambiguation), multiple people
- Norman Davies (born 1939), English historian

=== O ===
- Olive Blanche Davies Australian botanist
- Oliver Ford Davies, English actor
- Oscar Davies, first openly non-binary English blister
- Owen Davies (disambiguation), multiple people

=== P ===
- Patricia Davies (field hockey), Zimbabwean field hockey player
- Paul Davies (disambiguation), multiple people
- Peter Davies (disambiguation), multiple people
- Peter Ho Davies, English author
- Peter Llewelyn Davies, see Llewelyn Davies
- Peter Maxwell Davies (1934–2016), English composer
- Philip Davies (born 1972), British politician
- Philip R. Davies, British scholar
- A. Powell Davies, American Unitarian Minister

=== Q ===
- Quentin Davies, British politician

=== R ===
- R.E.G. Davies, English scholar and aviation writer
- Ray Davies, English musician and member of The Kinks
- Rees Davies (1938–2005), Welsh historian
- Reine Davies, American actress
- Rhett Davies, producer
- Rhys Davies (disambiguation), multiple people
- Richard Davies (disambiguation), multiple people
  - Richard Gareth Davies, English entomologist
  - Rick Davies (1944–2025), English musician with Supertramp
- Riley Davies, British rapper known as ArrDee
- Rob Davies (disambiguation), multiple people
- Robert Davies (disambiguation), multiple people
- Robertson Davies, Canadian author
- Robin Davies (1954–2010), Welsh actor
- Roger Davies (disambiguation), multiple people
- Ron Davies (disambiguation), multiple people
- Ronald Davies (disambiguation), multiple people
- Rosemary Davies, American actress
- Rosina Davies (1863–1949), Welsh evangelist
- Roy Davies (disambiguation), multiple people
- Rupert Davies, English actor
- Russell Davies, Welsh television personality
- Russell T Davies, Welsh television writer
- Ryan Davies, Welsh entertainer

=== S ===
- Sally Davies (disambiguation), multiple people
- Sam Davies (disambiguation), multiple people
- Samuel Davies (disambiguation), multiple people
- Sara Davies (born 1984), British businesswoman
- Sarah Davies (disambiguation), multiple people
- Scott Davies (disambiguation), multiple people
- Sean Davies (born 1973), Zimbabwean cricketer
- Sean Davies (footballer) (born 1985), English footballer
- Sharron Davies (born 1962), English swimmer
- Shaun Davies (disambiguation), multiple people
- Shona Rapira Davies, New Zealand artist
- Siobhan Davies, English dancer
- Simon Davies (disambiguation), multiple people
- S. O. Davies (1886–1972), British politician
- Somerset Davies (1754–1817), English politician
- Sonja Davies, New Zealand trade unionist and politician
- Stan Davies (disambiguation), multiple people
- Stephen Davies (disambiguation), multiple people
- Steven Davies, English cricketer
- Stevie Davies, Welsh novelist
- Stewart Davies, English football chairman
- Stuart Davies (rugby union) (born 1965), Welsh rugby union player
- Sue Jones-Davies, Welsh actress and singer
- Sylvia Llewelyn Davies (1866–1910), mother of the boys who served as the inspiration for Peter Pan

=== T ===
- T. Glynne Davies (1926–1988), Welsh poet and broadcaster
- Terence Davies (1945–2023), English film director and screenwriter
- Theophilus Harris Davies (1834–1898), British businessman
- Thomas Davies (disambiguation), includes Tom Davies
- Tim Davies (disambiguation)
- Tod Davies (born 1955), American screenwriter
- Treffor Davies (1938–2013), Welsh cricketer
- Tru Davies, fictional eponymous character in Tru Calling
- Tudor Davies (1892–1958), Welsh tenor

=== V ===
- Valentine Davies (1905–1961), American film director
- Vanessa Lloyd-Davies (1960–2005), British doctor, equestrian and soldier

=== W ===
- W. H. Davies (1871–1940), Welsh poet and writer
- W. P. C. Davies (1928–2018), English rugby player and headmaster
- W. R. Davies (1893–1959), second president (1941–1959) of the University of Wisconsin-Eau Claire
- Walford Davies (1869–1941), English composer
- William Davies (disambiguation), multiple people
- William Rupert Davies (1879–1967), former Canadian senator
- Windsor Davies (1930–2019), English actor
- Wyn Davies (1942–2025), Welsh footballer

=== Z ===
- Zach Davies (born 1993), American baseball player

== See also ==
- Davis (disambiguation), a placename and surname, among other uses
- Davies-Gilbert
- Baron Davies
- Llewelyn Davies, the family closely connected with J. M. Barrie's Peter Pan
