= Fred Davis =

Fred, Frederic, Frederick, or Fredrick Davis may refer to:

== Sports ==
- Fred Davis (snooker player) (1913–1998), English billiards and snooker champion
- Fred Davis (footballer, born 1871) (1871–?), English football (soccer) player
- Fred Davis (footballer, born 1913), English football (soccer) player
- Fred Davis (footballer, born 1929) (1929–1996), English football (soccer) player
- Fred Davis (defensive lineman) (1918–1995), American football player
- Fred Davis (tight end) (born 1986), American football player
- Fred Davis II (born 2002), American football player

== Others ==
- Fredrick Davis (dancer) (born 1986), African-American ballet dancer
- Fred Davis (entrepreneur) (born 1955), American technology entrepreneur, author, and media executive
- Fred Davis III, American political ad guru
- Fred Davis (politician) (1868–1945), Canadian farmer and politician
- Frederick Davis (politician) (1866–1950), Australian politician, member of the Western Australian Legislative Council
- Fred Davis (broadcaster) (1921–1996), Canadian broadcaster
- Frederick W. Davis (1878–1961), American dealer, collector and jewelry designer in Mexico
- Fred Davis (comics), fictional true identity of one of the various characters to use the name Bucky in comic books published by Marvel Comics
- Frederick Curtice Davis (1915–1941), Navy Cross recipient
  - USS Frederick C. Davis
- Fred Langdon Davis (1868–1951), lawyer and political figure in Manitoba, Canada
- Fred Henry Davis (1894–1937), American lawyer and judge
- Frederick Lewis Davis, Liberal politician in South Wales
- Fred Davis Jr., New Hampshire politician
- Frederick T. Davis, American legal scholar

== See also ==
- Frederick Davies (disambiguation)
- Frederick Davis Shaw (1909–1977), Canadian politician
- Davis (surname)
