= Donald Davis =

Donald or Don Davis may refer to:

== Entertainment ==
- Donald Davis (writer) (1904–1992), American playwright and screenwriter
- Don Marion Davis (1917–2020), American child actor
- Donald Davis (actor) (1928–1998), Canadian actor and theatre director
- Don Davis (record producer) (1938–2014), for Motown and Stax
- Donald A. Davis (1939–2021), writer of military histories and military thrillers
- Don S. Davis (1942–2008), actor known for his roles in Stargate SG-1 and Twin Peaks
- Donald Davis (storyteller) (born 1944), American storyteller
- Don Davis (artist) (born 1952), astronomer known for his painting of space
- Don Davis (composer) (born 1957), known for his scores for films such as The Matrix trilogy
- Donald E. Davis, author and historian
- Don Davis, a pen-name of Brett Halliday

== Politics ==
- Donald Watson Davis (1849–1906), politician from Northwest Territories, Canada
- Donald M. Davis (1915–1976), Pennsylvania politician
- Don Davis (Florida politician) (1931–2008), Republican from Jacksonville, Florida
- Don Davis (North Carolina politician) (born 1971), North Carolina politician
- Donald Davis (North Carolina Republican politician) (1930–2015), North Carolina politician

== Sports ==
- Don Davis (racing driver) (1933–1962), American race car driver
- Donnie Davis (American football end) (1940–2004)
- Don Davis (defensive tackle) (1943–2018), American football player
- Don Davis (linebacker) (born 1972), American football player
- Donnie Davis (born 1972), American quarterback in college and arena football
- Don Davis (Gaelic footballer) (born 1969), Irish

== Other ==
- Donald C. Davis (1921–1998), admiral in the United States Navy
- Donald J. Davis (1929–2007), bishop of Erie
- Donald W. Davis (1921–2010), American businessman
- Don Davis (gun retailer) (1933–2016), gun store owner and former Brady bill supporter turned critic
- Donald R. Davis (entomologist) (1934–2024), American entomologist
- Donald R. Davis (astronomer), American astronomer
- Donald R. Davis (economist) (born 1956), American economist
- Donald M. Davis (mathematician) (born 1945), American mathematician

== See also ==
- Donald Davies (disambiguation)
