= Ann Davis =

Ann or Anne Davis may refer to:

- Ann Davis (journalist), American journalist
- Ann Davis (convict) (1758–1789), first woman to be legally executed in New South Wales
- Ann Davis (model) (born 1938), American model
- Ann B. Davis (1926–2014), American actress
- Anne C. Davis (died 1984), American mathematician
- Anne-Christine Davis (born 1951), British theoretical physicist
- Anne Johnson Davis (died 2010), American woman who published a memoir about satanic ritual abuse
- Mihi Edwards (1918–2008), New Zealand writer, social worker, teacher and kaumātua, known as Anne Davis before her marriage
- Ruth Ann Davis (1936–2009), American educator and academic

== See also ==
- Anne Davies (disambiguation)
- Anna Davis (born 2006), American amateur golfer
- Anna U Davis (born 1975), Swedish-American visual artist
- Annie Davis (born 1976), American singer-songwriter
- Annie Elizabeth Davis (1870–1943), New Zealand photographer
