= Alex Davis =

Alex Davis may refer to:

- Alex Davis (footballer), New Zealand football player
- Alex Davis (basketball) (born 1992), American basketball player
- Alex Davis (rugby union) (born 1992), England rugby union player

== Fictional characters ==
- Alex Davis (Arrowverse)

== See also ==
- Alexander Davis (disambiguation), multiple people
- Alex Davies (disambiguation)
