= Michael Davis =

Michael or Mike Davis may refer to:

== Arts and entertainment ==
- Michael Davis (bassist) (1943–2012), American bass guitarist, singer, record producer
- Michael Davis (juggler) (born 1953), American juggler, comedian, and musician
- Michael Earl Davis (1959–2015), American puppeteer, actor, writer, singer
- Michael Davis (director) (born 1961), American film director and screenwriter
- Michael Davis (trombonist) (born 1961), American jazz trombonist
- Mick Davis (director) (born 1961), Scottish film director, producer and screenwriter
- Mike Davis (guitarist) (born c. 1970), American guitarist
- Michael Cory Davis (fl. 2003), American actor, filmmaker, and activist
- Mike Davis (screenwriter), American screenwriter, producer, and director
- Michael Davis (artist) (born 1948), American artist
- Michael Davis (comics creator) (born 1958), co-founder of Milestone Media
- Mike Davis (actor) (1945–1986), American art director, set designer, model, and actor

== Politics and government ==
- Michael Davis (Australian lawyer)
- Michael Davis (Irish politician) (1875–1944), Irish politician
- Michael Davis (author) (born 1946), English political author
- Mike Davis (scholar) (1946–2022), American writer, political activist, urban theorist, and historian
- Michael J. Davis (born 1947), American judge
- Michael K. Davis (born 1952), American justice of the Wyoming Supreme Court (2012–2022)
- Michael Davis (Missouri politician), politician from Missouri
- Mike Davis (American lawyer)
- Mike Davis (Alaska politician) (born 1946), American politician from Alaska
- Mike Davis (California politician) (born 1957), American politician from California

== Sports ==
=== American football ===
- Michael Davis (defensive back) (born 1995), American football defensive back
- Mike Davis (defensive back, born 1956) (1956–2021), American football defensive back in the 1970s and 80s
- Mike Davis (defensive back, born 1972), American football defensive back in the 1990s
- Mike Davis (running back) (born 1993), American football running back
- Mike Davis (wide receiver) (born 1992), American football wide receiver
- Mike Davis (American football coach) (fl. 1975–76)

=== Basketball ===
- Mike Davis (basketball, born 1946), American basketball guard
- Mike Davis (basketball, born 1956), American basketball power forward
- Mike Davis (basketball, born 1960), American basketball shooting guard and current coach
- Mike Davis (basketball, born 1988), American basketball forward

=== Other sports ===
- Michael Earls-Davis (1921–2016), English cricketer
- Michael Davis (rower) (born 1940), American Olympic rower
- Michael Davis or Bugsy McGraw (born 1945), American professional wrestler
- Michael Davis (Australian footballer) (born 1961), former Australian rules footballer
- Michael Davis (Belgian footballer) (born 2002), footballer
- Mike Davis (rugby union) (1942–2022), English rugby player and coach
- Michael Davis (athlete) (born 1959), Jamaican Olympic sprinter
- Mike Davis (baseball) (born 1959), American baseball player
- Mike Davis (wrestler) (1956–2001), American professional wrestler
- Michael Davis (weightlifter), American weightlifter
- Mike Davis (fighter) (born 1992), American mixed martial artist
- Mike Davis (pool player) (born 1975), American pool player

== Other people ==
- Michael G. Davis (1959– ), American television weather presenter and convicted sex offender
- Michael M. Davis (1879–1971), American health care policy specialist
- Michael DeMond Davis (1939–2003), American journalist
- Mike Davis (boat builder) (1939–2008), American boat builder and boating advocate
- Michael Davis (philosopher) (born 1943), American philosopher, author, and professor
- Michael C. Davis (born 1949), professor of law and international affairs
- Michael Peter Davis (born 1947), American philosopher
- Michael W. Davis (born 1949), American mathematician, author and academic
- Mick Davis (born 1958), South African-British businessman
- Michael E. Davis (businessman), American businessman on the initial Wikimedia Foundation Board of Trustees

== See also ==
- Michael Davies (disambiguation)
- Mickey Davis, American basketball player
