= Theophilus Jones (historian) =

Welsh lawyer and historian (1759–1812)

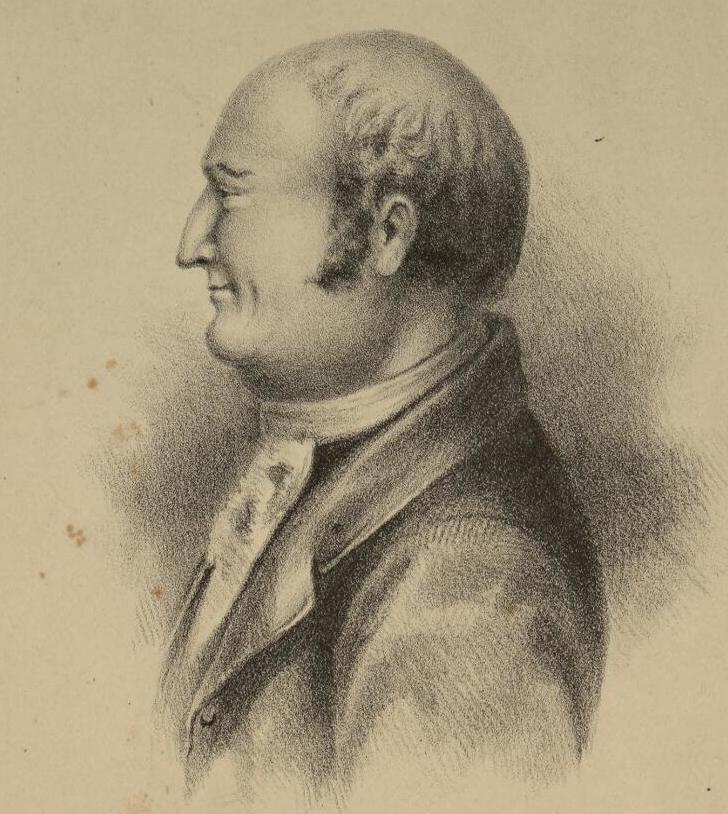
Portrait of Theophilus Jones – Welsh lawyer, known as a historian of Brecknockshire

Theophilus Jones (18 October 1758 – 15 January 1812) FSA was a Welsh lawyer and an historian of Brecknockshire in Mid Wales. He was born in Brecon, the only son of Hugh Jones, the curate of St David's Church, Llanddew, and his wife, Elinor Evans, the elder daughter of the historian Theophilus Evans. In 1783 Jones married Mary Price from Porth-y-rhyd, in Llanwrda in Carmarthenshire, in St Brides, Pembrokeshire. Jones is famous for his two-volume work History of the County of Brecknock (1805-1809), which he wrote while living in Brecon.

== Life ==
In 1767 Jones spent much of his boyhood at Llwyn Einion, Llangamarch, the home of his maternal grandfather. Subsequently, when his grandfather died he became the beneficiary of his estate and his many historical books and papers, which Davies (1909) described as 'valuable materials for the History.' Jones attended Christ College, Brecon, after which he became articled to Penoyre Watkins a solicitor in the town. After becoming qualified he successfully practiced the law for many years and married Mary Price, the daughter of Rice Price of Porth-y-rhyd in Carmarthenshire. Later he was appointed as deputy-registrar of the Archdeaconry of Brecon. Davies (1905) observed:

'Amongst the documents committed to his care were the records of the various parishes for centuries past, in the perusal of which he must have obtained a great amount of the information he afterwards introduced into his History. There is every reason to believe, that he had no natural inclination for the profession, to which he had been brought up, his chief delight being in literary studies and antiquarian research, but it was not until the year 1800 or 1801, that he seriously entertained the idea of writing the History of his native county.'

Jones' father died in 1799. The combination of his death, the inheritance of his estate and the support of Jones' wife enabled him to concentrate full-time on undertaking his research into the history of Brecknorshire, which he undertook while he was living at home.

== Literary output ==
Jones's most famous work is History of the County of Brecknock, which Edwin Davies (1909), the local printer and editor, described as 'the first real attempt at a county history within the Principality' and which Morgan (2020) observed 'has been considered the finest of the county histories'. The History was published in three volumes. One volume was published in 1805 and other two volumes were published in 1809. The History was posthumously reprinted in one volume in 1898, which Davies (1905) observed 'was speedily sold, and very many of the copies were subsequently bought up at enhanced prices for the American book market'. Davies (1905) also observed that 'in 1902 a third edition was projected.' However, instead, from 1909 to 1930 Joseph Russell Bailey, 1st Baron Glanusk reprinted and enlarged the History in four volumes which were called the Glanusk editions.

Jones also published antiquarian communications in magazines, two papers in the Cambrian Register in 1795 and 1796, and a paper in the Archaeologia, the journal of the Society of Antiquaries of London, in 1814. He planned to write a history of Radnorshire and he began a translation of Ellis Wynne's romance Gweledigaethau y Bardd Cwsg (Visions of the Sleeping Bard), neither of which materialised.

== Tributes ==
Jones died in Brecon on 15 January 1812 and was buried in the church of Llangammarch. Upon his death, his widow erected in the chapel of Christ's College 'a white and grey marble tablet to his memory, with the following inscription':

"To the memory of Theophilus Jones, Esq., late Chapter Clerk of this Collegiate Church, and Deputy Registrar of the Archdeaconry of Brecknock. He died January the 15th, 1812, aged 51. His remains, with those of his maternal grandfather, Theophilus Evans, Clk., lie interred in the Cemetery of Llangammarch. This marble but records his name — the History of this, his loved, his native County, will long survive and be his Monument. The above Theophilus Jones was the son of the Rev. Hugh Jones, who was Prebendary of Boughrood, Llanbedr Painscastle, of this Collegiate Church."

Noted Welsh historian Glanmor Williams (1991) opined 'Most scholars nowadays would rate [Jones] as undoubtedly the best of the old-style county historians; one who can still be read with profit as well as pleasure.'
