= Cathay City =

Headquarters of Cathay Pacific

Cathay Pacific City
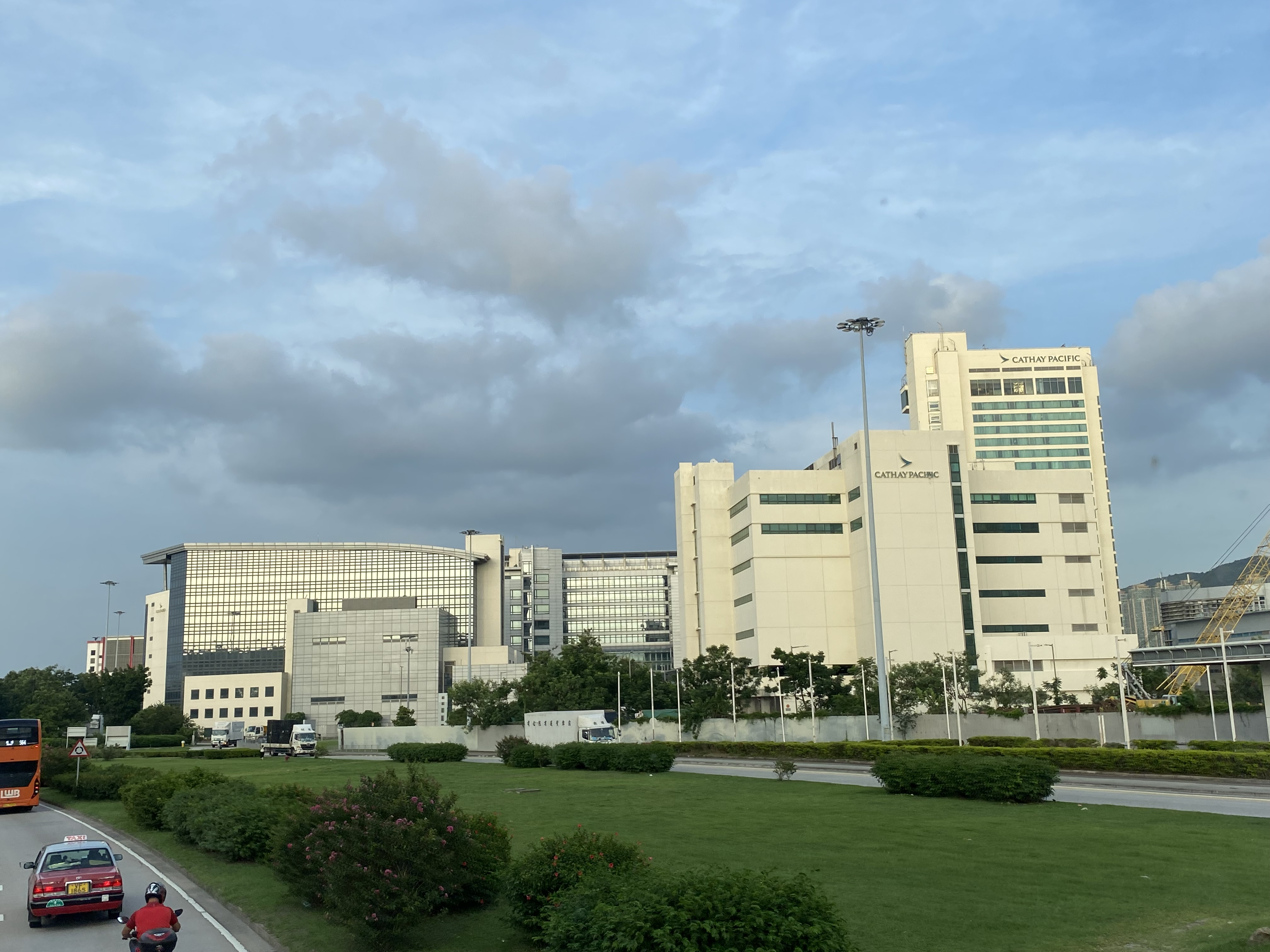
- Cathay City

- Location within Hong Kong

General information
- Status: Completed
- Location: Cathay City, 8 Scenic Road, Hong Kong International Airport, Lantau, Hong Kong
- Coordinates: 22.2974°N 113.9344°E
- Topped-out: 17 February 1998; 28 years ago

Design and construction
- Architect: Llewelyn-Davies

Cathay City
- Traditional Chinese: 國泰城
- Simplified Chinese: 国泰城
Transcriptions
Standard Mandarin
- Hanyu Pinyin: Guótài Chéng
Yue: Cantonese
- Jyutping: gwok3 taai3 sing4

Cathay Pacific City (Chinese: 國泰城; Jyutping: gwok3 taai3 sing4), often referred as Cathay City, is the headquarters of Cathay Pacific, Hong Kong's flag-carrying airline. It is located at Hong Kong International Airport, on the south side.

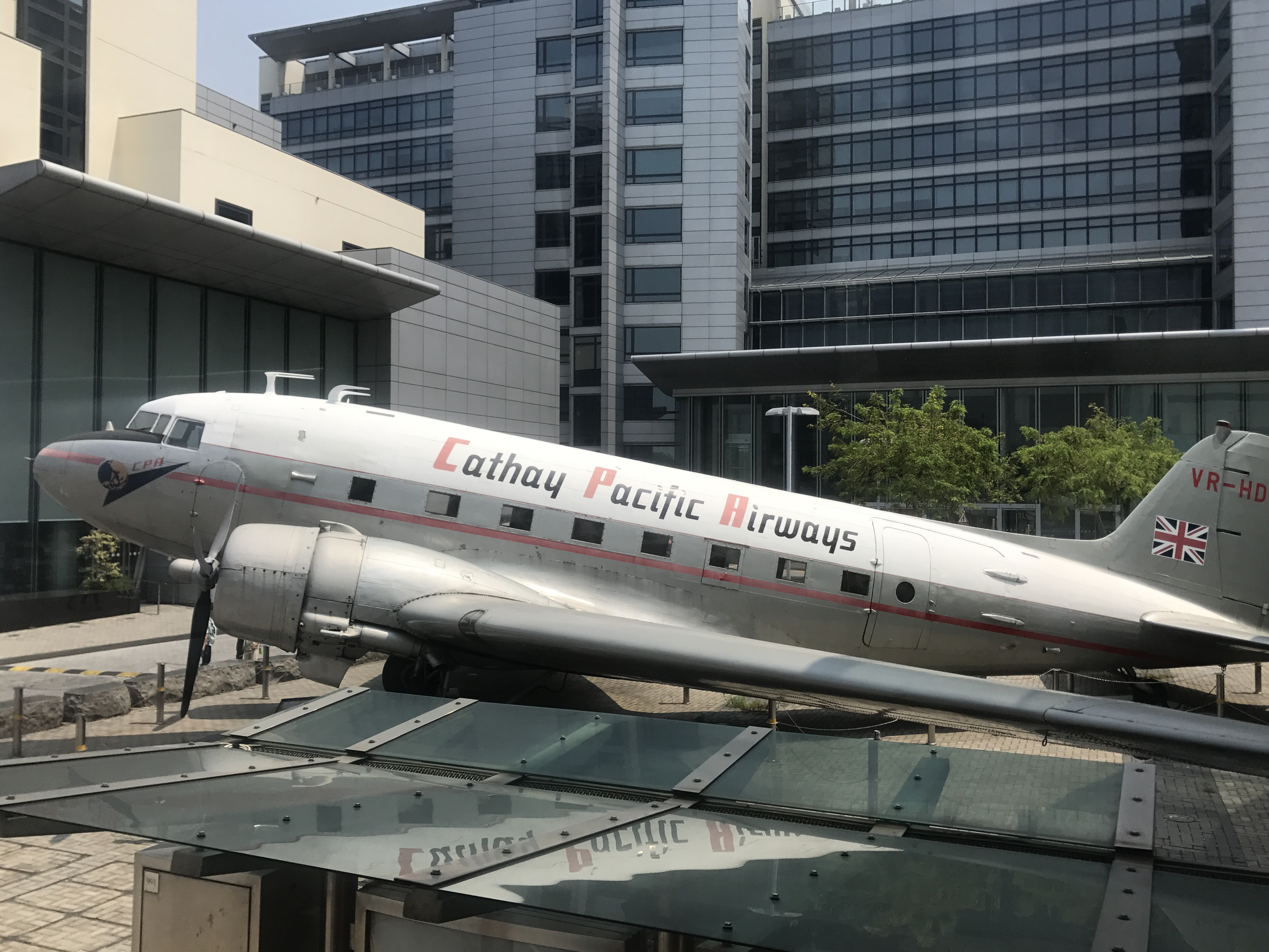
A DC-3 with the livery of Cathay Pacific Airways' second aircraft, Niki, in front of Cathay City

== History ==
The airline built Cathay Pacific City so that all central employees could work in one location.

The facility was initially to cost $3.5 billion Hong Kong dollars (US$452.8 million as of 1995). The plans called for about 1,000,000 square feet (93,000 m^{2}) of office space on 3.3 hectares (8.2 acres) of land. In 1995 the Provisional Airport Authority (PAA) agreed to lease the site to the airline.

The headquarters opened in 1998. The topping out ceremony was held on 17 February 1998. Cathay Pacific City was scheduled to be built in increments between April and September 1998. It was scheduled to open in July, when Hong Kong International Airport at Chek Lap Kok was to open. It was scheduled to have over 3,000 employees. The airline's move to the centre was scheduled to begin in June. On 6 July, operational departments were scheduled to be ready for the airport. In the second half of 1998 the rest of the airline was scheduled to move in. Previously the airline's headquarters were at Swire House, a building in Central named after the airline's parent company. The architects were Llewelyn-Davies, who began design work in May 1995. Simon Jackson and Associates outfitted the hotel interiors. Cathay Pacific City had a cost of 4.9 billion Hong Kong dollars.

== Facility ==
Cathay Pacific City is located on 4 hectares (9.9 acres) of reclaimed land, located at the southeast corner of the platform of Hong Kong International Airport. Cathay Pacific City has 1,300,000 square feet (120,000 m^{2}) of space and is one of the largest corporate head office facilities in Asia.

Cathay Pacific City includes three 10-storey office buildings, a 23-storey staff hotel, HSBC Cathay City branch, a flight training centre with a safety training school, a workshop and storage building, a leisure centre, and an airline stores building. The centre has a 40-metre (130 ft) steel pedestrian bridge.

The head office of Air Hong Kong, as of 2004, is located on the fourth floor of the South Tower of Cathay Pacific City. In February 2012, FlightSafety International and Gulfstream Aerospace, in a venture with Cathay Pacific, opened a learning centre for pilots of Gulfstream 450 and Gulfstream 550 aircraft at Cathay Pacific City. The centre is not marked with the FlightSafety name.

The headquarters includes the Cathay Pacific Experience museum, which covers 5,000 square feet (460 m^{2}). The main gallery of the museum chronicles the airline's early history. The second gallery focuses on the airline's development. The third gallery explains the development into the contemporary airline. The Headland Hotel, a facility exclusively for Cathay Pacific and associated company employees, is located adjacent to Cathay Pacific City.

To access Cathay Pacific City employees are required to show electronic passes.

== Public transport ==
From Hong Kong city centre via MTR to:

- Tung Chung – via the Long Win Bus route S64 from Tung Chung station. The second stop is Cathay Pacific City.
- Airport – via the HAS crew shuttle to Cathay Pacific City from the Terminal 1 Ground Transportation Centre.

== See also ==
- CAL Park (China Airlines head office in Taoyuan, Taiwan)
- Waterside (building) (British Airways head office in London)
