= Arthur Davis =

Arthur Davis may refer to:

== Entertainment ==
- Arthur Davis (animator) (1905–2000), American animator and director
- Art Davis (actor) (1913–1987), American musician, singer, and actor
- Art Davis (bassist) (1934–2007), American jazz bassist
- Arthur Hoey Davis (1868–1935), Australian writer who used the pen name Steele Rudd

== Sports ==
- Art Davis (American football) (1934–2021), American football player
- Arthur Davis (English cricketer) (1882–1916), English cricketer
- Arthur Davis (Australian cricketer) (1898–1943), Australian cricketer
- Arthur Davis (gymnast) (born 1974), American gymnast

== Other ==
- Arthur Powell Davis (1861–1933), American hydrographer and engineer
- Arthur Vining Davis (1867–1962), American businessman and philanthropist
- Arthur Joseph Davis (1878–1951), British architect
- Arthur C. Davis (1893–1965), United States Navy admiral
- Arthur P. Davis (1904–1996), African-American university teacher, literary scholar, and writer
- Arthur Marshall Davis (1907–1963), U.S. federal judge

== See also ==
- Arthur Davis Glacier in Antarctica
- Arthur Davies (disambiguation)
- Artur Davis
