= Ronald Davis (disambiguation) =

Ronald Davis (1937–2025) was an American abstract geometric painter.

Ronald Davis or Ron Davis may also refer to:

== Sports ==
- Ronald Davis (field hockey) (1914–1989), British field hockey player
- Ron Davis (outfielder) (1941–1992), right-handed Major League Baseball outfielder
- Ron Davis (basketball) (born 1954), American basketball player
- Ron Davis (pitcher) (born 1955), former Major League Baseball pitcher
- Ron Davis (defensive back) (born 1972), American football player

== Other ==
- Ronald Davis (physician) (1956–2008), American physician
- Ron Davis (filmmaker), American documentary filmmaker
- Ron Davis (jazz musician), pianist and composer based in Toronto, Canada
- Ron Davis Alvarez (born 1986), Venezuelan musician
- Ronald W. Davis (born 1941), biochemist and geneticist at Stanford University
- Ronald Bramwell-Davis (1905–1974), cricketer and British Army officer
- Ronald L. Davis, American law enforcement officer and government official
- Ronald G. Davis (1933–2026), American mime and theater director

== See also ==
- Ronald Davies (disambiguation)
- Ronnie Davis (1950–2017), Jamaican reggae singer
- Ronnie Davis (drag racer) (1950–2016), American drag racer
- Ronnie Davis (darts player) (born 1942), English darts player
