= Steve Davis (disambiguation) =

Steve Davis (born 1957) is an English snooker player.

Steve, Stephen or Steven Davis may also refer to:

== Business ==
- Steve Davis (executive), American engineer and executive at The Boring Company, SpaceX and DOGE
- Steven Davis (executive) (1958/9–2022), CEO of Bob Evans Restaurants, president of Long John Silver's and A&W Restaurants
- Steve Davis (business), American executive and health advocate

== Entertainment ==
- Steve "Pablo" Davis (1916–2013), American artist and activist
- Steve Davis (bassist) (1929–1987), jazz bassist
- Stephen Davis (screenwriter) (born 1950), British screenwriter
- Steve Davis (American drummer) (born 1958), American jazz drummer
- Steve Davis (trombonist) (born 1967), American jazz trombonist
- Steve Davis (Northern Irish drummer), Northern Irish jazz drummer
- Stephen Allen Davis (1949–2022), American singer-songwriter
- Stephen Davis (music journalist), American music writer
- Steven A. Davis, New Zealand stunt man and actor
- Richard Cansino (born 1953), American voice actor credited as Steve Davis in Street Fighter II: The Animated Movie

== Academics ==
- Steven Davis (economist), American economist at Stanford University
- Stephen H. Davis (1939–2021), American mathematician
- Steve Davis (scientist), American earth system scientist at Stanford University
- Stephen T. Davis, American philosopher

== Sports ==
- Steve Davis (running back) (born 1948), American football player
- Steve Davis (quarterback) (1952–2013), American football quarterback for the Oklahoma Sooners
- Steve Davis (umpire) (born 1952), Australian cricket umpire
- Steve Davis (infielder) (born 1953), American baseball infielder
- Steve Davis (snooker) (born 1957), English snooker player
- Steve Davis (pitcher) (born 1960), American baseball pitcher
- Steve Davis (footballer, born 1965), English footballer, academy manager at Wolverhampton Wanderers
- Steve Davis (footballer, born 1968), English footballer, coach at Bolton Wanderers
- Stephen Davis (American football) (born 1974), American football player
- Steven Davis (born 1985), Northern Irish footballer

== Other ==
- Steve Davis (politician) (born 1949), American politician in Illinois
- Stephen L. Davis, U.S Air Force general

== See also ==
- Stephen Davies (disambiguation)
- List of people with surname Davis
