= Kenneth Davis =

Kenneth Davis may refer to:

- Kenneth Davis (basketball) (born 1948), American Olympic basketball player
- Kenneth B. Davis, Dean of the University of Wisconsin Law School
- Kenneth C. Davis, American author of educational books
- Kenneth Culp Davis (1908–2003), American legal scholar
- Kenneth Davis (American football) (born 1962), American football player
- Kenneth S. Davis (1912–1999), American historian
- Kenneth L. Davis, American medical researcher and President and C.E.O. of Mount Sinai Medical Center in New York City
- Kenneth Davis Jr., American politician
- Kenny Davis (musician) (born 1961), American jazz bassist
- Kenny Davis (footballer) (born 1988), English footballer
- Kenn Davis (1932–2010), American surrealist and mystery novel writer
- Ken Davis (journalist), Emmy-Award-winning television producer, journalist, and author
- Ken Davis (entrepreneur), founder of Bar-B-Q-Sauce line sold to General Mills

== See also ==
- Ken Davies (disambiguation)
