= Ernest Davis =

Ernest Davis may refer to:

- Ernie Davis (1939–1963), American football running back
- Sir Ernest Davis (brewer) (1872–1962), New Zealand brewer and mayor of Auckland
- Ernest D. Davis, mayor of Mount Vernon, New York

== See also ==
- Ernest Davies (disambiguation)
