= Eric Douglas Cummings =

- Born: 13 April 1896; Franklin, Tasmania, Australia
- Died: 27 October 1979 (aged 83)
- Military career
- Allegiance: Australia; United Kingdom
- Branch: Australian Flying Corps; Royal Air Force
- Service years: 1914–1920; 1923–c. 1942
- Rank: Wing Commander
- Unit: No. 2 Squadron AFC
- Conflicts: World War I World War II
- Awards: Distinguished Flying Cross

Captain Eric Douglas Cummings (13 April 1896 – 27 October 1979) was an Australian World War I flying ace credited with nine aerial victories while flying for the Australian Flying Corps. Postwar, he was an integral part of fund-raising campaigns to care for his fellow Australian military veterans. He then served in the Royal Air Force reserves until reactivated for service during World War II.

== Early life ==
Cummings was born to Doctor and Mrs. H. L. Cummings in Franklin, Tasmania, Australia on 13 April 1896. He had a brother, Roy, who would serve in the Australian Flying Corps with him.

Cummings (serial number 1026) enlisted in the 2nd Signal Company, Australian Imperial Force on 27 October 1914, giving his profession as cart driver and claiming 15 months prior service in C Company, 93rd Regiment of the militia. He embarked for departure from Australia in December 1914; he was in the 15th Battalion as a bugler. He served in the Gallipoli Campaign before transferring to aviation.

== World War I aviation service ==
Cummings was assigned to train at the flying school at RAF Shawbury. He completed all phases of his training in three weeks, and was posted to No. 2 Squadron AFC. Although he had yet to score an aerial victory, his rise through the ranks was rapid, and he was appointed Flight Commander on 17 October 1916. He subsequently liaised with Rene Fonck in operations against Manfred von Richthofen's Flying Circus. (Note: Appointment as a Flight Commander was customarily accompanied by a promotion to captain.)

Details of Cummings' service over the next year and a half are missing. By May 1918, however, he was assigned to 2 Squadron AFC as a Royal Aircraft Factory SE.5a pilot. On 3 May 1918, he scored his first aerial victory. His brother Roy mailed home a copy of orders describing the action; this was reprinted in The (Hobart) Mercury in the Cummings' native Tasmania. The reprint gives a vivid description of early aerial warfare:

"Lieutenant E. D. Cummings...attacked a...triplane, and fired a burst from both guns into it. The enemy aircraft immediately went down in a spin, followed by Lieutenant Cummings, still firing. The enemy aircraft then turned on its back, and finally crashed....At this point Lieutenant Cummings was attacked by four...triplanes, who shot away his elevator controls, instrument board, petrol and oil tanks; his machine went down almost out of control, but he managed to keep it out of a spin until it...crashed. His safety-belt broke, and he was thrown clear of the machine into a shell-hole...."

Nothing daunted, Cummings went on to score eight more confirmed aerial wins and rise to the rank of captain. His bravery would win him a Distinguished Flying Cross, which would be gazetted on 8 February 1919:

"This officer has proved himself an able and determined leader of offensive patrols. In carrying out these raids he has met with conspicuous success, heavy damage being inflicted on enemy material and personnel. This has been due in the main to his brilliant leadership and skilful navigation. Capt. Cummings possesses, in a marked degree, courage, combined with cool judgment."

== List of aerial victories ==
No.	Date/time	Aircraft	Foe	Result	Location	Notes
1	3 May 1918 @ 1130 hours	Royal Aircraft Factory SE.5a serial number B168	Fokker Triplane	Destroyed	Meteren	
2	1 June 1918 @ 0900 hours	Royal Aircraft Factory SE.5a s/n B195	Pfalz D.III	Destroyed	East of Pozières	
3	31 July 1918 @ 1115 hours	Royal Aircraft Factory SE.5a s/n C6473	LVG reconnaissance plane	Set afire; destroyed	East of Laventie	
4	31 July 1918 @ 1115 hours	Royal Aircraft Factory SE.5a s/n C6473	LVG reconnaissance plane	Driven down out of control	Merville	
5	15 September 1918 @ 1720 hours	Royal Aircraft Factory SE.5a s/n C6473	Albatros reconnaissance plane	Destroyed	West of Macquart	Victory shared with Ernest Davies
6	14 October 1918 @ 1010 hours	Royal Aircraft Factory SE.5a s/n C6473	Fokker D.VII	Destroyed	West of Cysoing	
7	14 October 1918 @ 1015 hours	Royal Aircraft Factory SE.5a s/n C6473	Fokker D.VII	Driven down out of control	East of Gruson	
8	14 October 1918 @ 1020 hours	Royal Aircraft Factory SE.5a s/n C6473	Fokker D.VII	Driven down out of control	Hertain	
9	1 November 1918 @ 1415 hours	Royal Aircraft Factory SE.5a s/n C6473	LVG reconnaissance plane	Driven down out of control	Antoing	Victory shared with Ernest Davies

== Between the wars ==
Cummings returned to Australia after the war; on 28 August 1919 he flew an aerobatic exhibition in a Sopwith Pup over downtown Hobart, including eight loops. The exhibition was a public relations stunt to draw a crowd to subscribe to a Peace Loan of 750,000 Pounds to care for military veterans. After his departure from Hobart, he barnstormed locally for the Peace Loan, despite engine trouble after departing Launceston for Longford and Devonport on 9 September 1919.

On 11 February 1920 Cummings was invested with the Distinguished Flying Cross by General William Birdwood in Cummings' home town of Franklin.

On 7 June 1923 Cummings was granted a short service commission in the Royal Air Force as a Flying Officer.

On 7 June 1928 he was transferred to Class A Reserve of the Royal Air Force; he would remain in the reserves in various capacities until World War II.

While Cummings was a reservist he was promoted to Flight Lieutenant on 4 February 1931.

Also during this time, on 27 April 1932, he was elected to membership in the Royal Aero Club.

== World War II ==
Cummings returned to active service for World War II. On 7 June 1940 he was promoted to temporary Squadron Leader. On 1 March 1942, Cummings was promoted to temporary Wing Commander.

== Endnotes ==
Footnotes

Citations
