= Ernest Davies =

Ernest Davies may refer to:

- Ernest Davies (Stretford MP) (1926–2020), Labour Member of Parliament for Stretford, 1966–1970
- Ernest Davies (Enfield MP) (1902–1991), Labour Member of Parliament for Enfield, 1945–1950, and Enfield East, 1950–1959, Under-Secretary of State for Foreign Affairs, 1950–1951
- Ernest Salter Davies (1872–1955), Welsh teacher and educationalist
- Ernest Davies (aviator) (1890–?), Australian World War I flying ace

== See also ==
- Ernest Davis (disambiguation)
