= Anne Davies =

Ann or Anna or Anne Davies may refer to:

- Anne Davies (British journalist) (born 1958), presenter for the BBC local news programme East Midlands Today
- Anne Davies (figure skater) (1930–1995), American figure skater
- Anne Davies (Australian journalist), Washington correspondent for Australian newspapers The Age and The Sydney Morning Herald
- Anne Davies (legal scholar) (born 1973), lawyer at the University of Oxford
- N. Anne Davies (born 1943), American physicist
- Ann Davies (occultist) (1912–1975), American occultist
- Ann Davies (actress) (1934–2022), English actress
- Ann Davies (translator) (1914–1954), British actress and translator
- Ann Catherine Davies (1894–1965), later Ann Horton, British physicist
- Ann Romney (born 1949 as Ann Davies), wife of politician Mitt Romney
- Anna Morpurgo Davies (1937–2014), Italian philologist
- Ann Davies (politician), Welsh politician, member of parliament for Caerfyrddin
- Anna Davies (rugby league), English rugby league player
- Anna Davies, novelist in the Point Horror series, novels include Wrecked and Identity Theft

== See also ==
- Ann Davis (disambiguation)
- Annie Davies (1910–1970), Welsh radio and television producer
