= Carleton Main Clement =

Canadian First World War flying ace

- Born: 15 May 1896; Toronto, Ontario, Canada
- Died: 19 August 1917 (aged 21); Near Langemarck
- Burial place: Arras Flying Services Memorial, Pas de Calais, France
- Military career
- Allegiance: King George V of the British Empire
- Branch: Canadian Expeditionary Force; Royal Flying Corps
- Rank: Captain
- Unit: No. 22 Squadron RFC
- Awards: Military Cross, Croix de Guerre

Captain Carleton Main Clement MC (15 May 1896 – 19 August 1917) was a Canadian First World War flying ace officially credited with 14 victories.

== Early life and service ==
Clement attended Victoria University, Toronto, before serving as a private in the 47th Battalion of the Canadian Expeditionary Force. His enlistment form of 17 June 1915 gives his next of kin as W. H. P. Clement, and claims that Clement had previously served as a commissioned officer in the "B. C. Horse". He was half an inch shy of six feet tall, with fair hair and complexion and blue eyes.

== Aerial service ==
He transferred to the Royal Flying Corps, being commissioned in March 1916. His assignment to 22 Squadron had him piloting the outmoded Royal Aircraft Factory FE.2b, with observers such as Llewelyn Davies manning the front guns. Between 4 December 1916 and 5 June 1917, he flew this obsolescent model to victory over eight different German Albatros fighters, sometimes teaming with such other aces as Gerald Gordon Bell, and earning the MC in the process. Towards the end of this run, he downed German ace Kurt Schneider; Schneider would suffer with an infected thigh wound until succumbing on 14 July.

Clement then switched to piloting Bristol F.2 Fighters. He and Davies set a reconnaissance plane afire on 29 July 1917. Clement scored again on 10 August. Then, two days later, he set an Albatros D.V afire, drove another down out of control, and teamed with other pilots to drive two more D.Vs down out of control.

== Death in action ==
On 19 August, Clement was shot down and killed by antiaircraft fire from Flakzug 99. Hugh Trenchard himself sent a telegram of regret to 22 Squadron.
