= Arthur Davies =

Arthur Davies may refer to:

- Arthur Davies (footballer) (1886–1949), Welsh international footballer
- Arthur Davies (politician) (1867–1918), Australian politician
- Arthur Davies (priest) (1878–1966), Anglican Dean of Worcester
- Arthur Davies (swimmer), British swimmer
- Arthur Davies (tenor) (1941–2018), Welsh tenor
- Arthur Bowen Davies (1863–1928), American artist
- Arthur Llewelyn Davies (1863–1907), father of the boys who served as the inspiration for the children of J. M. Barrie's stories of Neverland
- Arthur E. Davies, founder and musical director of the Luton Girls Choir
- Arthur Vernon Davies (1872–1942), member of parliament for Royton, 1924–1931

== See also ==
- Arthur Davis (disambiguation)
- Art Davie, entrepreneur
- Arthur Davies Stadium, Kitwe, Zambia
- Davies, a patronymic Welsh surname
