= Frederick Davies =

Frederick Davies may refer to:

- Frederick Davies (GC) (1913–1945), English fireman and George Cross recipient
- Fred Davies (footballer, born 1939) (1939–2020), English football goalkeeper and manager
- Frederick H. Davies (1871–?), English forward who played for Sheffield United
- Frederick T. Davies Jr., American scientist and professor of horticulture
- Freddie Davies (born 1937), British comedian and actor
- Fred Davies (footballer, born 1908) (1908–1978), Australian rules footballer for Fitzroy
- Fred Davies (footballer, born 1921) (1921–1961), Australian rules footballer for Carlton
- Fred Davies (politician), Canadian MP
- Fred Davies (rugby union) (born 1998), English rugby union player

== See also ==
- Fred Davis (disambiguation)
