= Michael Davies =

Michael Davies may refer to:

== Entertainment ==
- Michael Davies (television producer) (born 1966), British producer of television game shows in the United States
- Mike Davies (broadcaster) (born 1978), disc jockey
- Michael ffolkes (Michael Davies, 1925–1988), illustrator and cartoonist
- Dik Mik (Michael Davies, born 1943–2017), British musician with the band Hawkwind

== Sports ==
- Michael Davies (cricketer) (born 1976), English cricketer
- Michael Davies (ice hockey) (born 1986), American professional ice hockey player
- Mike Davies (ice hockey) (born 1997), Canadian professional ice hockey player
- Mike Davies (rugby league), of the 1980s for Wales and Cardiff City
- Mike Davies (footballer) (born 1966), English former professional footballer
- Mike Davies (tennis) (1936–2015), British tennis player

== Other ==
- Michael Davies (Catholic writer) (1936–2004), traditionalist Catholic writer
- Sir Michael Davies (parliamentary official) (born 1940), Clerk of the Parliaments 1997–2003
- Michael Davies (judge) (1921–2006), judge of the High Court of England and Wales
- Mike Davies (architect) (born 1942), architect
- Michael Llewelyn Davies (1900–1921), foster son of the author J.M. Barrie
- Michael Davies (priest) (1694–1779), Irish Anglican priest
- Michael Davies (writer, born 1964), British journalist and writer

== See also ==
- Davies
- Michael Davis (disambiguation)
