= Ian Davis =

Ian Davis may refer to:

- Ian Davis (businessman) (born 1951), British businessman
- Ian Davis (cricketer) (born 1953), former Australian cricketer
- Ian Davis (politician) (1939–2016), former Australian politician

== See also ==
- Ian McNaught-Davis (1929–2014), British television presenter
- Ian Davies (disambiguation)
