= Sean Davis =

Sean, Shawn, or Shaun Davis may refer to:

== Sportspeople ==
=== American football ===
- Sean Davis (American football) (born 1993), American football player, NFL safety
- Shawn Davis (American football) (born 1997), American football player, NFL safety
- Shawn Davis, member of 2014 Delaware Fightin' Blue Hens football team

=== Other sportspeople ===
- Sean Davis (footballer, born 1979) (born 1979), English footballer
- Sean Davis (soccer, born 1993) (born 1993), American soccer player
- Sean Davis (boxer) (born 1990), English boxer
- Shaun Davis (1966–2023), bodybuilder

== Others ==
- Sean Davis, co-founder of the website The Federalist
- Shawn Davis, musician in Stonehoney
- Shawn Davis on List of hazing deaths in the United States
- Philip "Sean" Davis, candidate in the Portland, Oregon mayoral election, 2016

== See also ==
- Sean Davies (disambiguation)
- Shaun Davey (born 1948), Irish composer
