= Mervyn Davies =

Mervyn Davies may refer to:

- Mervyn Davies, Baron Davies of Abersoch (born 1952), British businessman
- Mervyn Davies (judge) (1918–2015), British judge
- Mervyn Davies (rugby union), (1946–2012), Welsh rugby player
