= Adam Davis =

Adam Davis may refer to:

- Adam Davis (umpire), former Australian rules football field umpire
- Adam Davis (pool player), English pool player
- Adam 'Tex' Davis (living), American screenwriter and director

== See also ==
- Adam Davies (disambiguation)
- Adam Hart-Davis (born 1943), English polymath
