= Sarah Davis =

Sarah or Sara Davis may refer to:

- Sarah Davis (ice hockey) (born 1992)
- Sarah Davis (politician) (born 1976)
- Sarah Iliff Davis (1820–1909), American milliner, business woman, philanthropist
- Sarah Knox Davis (1814–1835), daughter of the U.S. president Zachary Taylor
- Sarah Davis, a pseudonym of Sarah A. Bowman (c. 1813–1866), American pioneer
- Sara L.M. Davis, human rights advocate, author and researcher

== See also ==
- Sara Davis Buechner (born 1959), American pianist and educator
- Sarah Davies (disambiguation)
