= Roger Davis =

Roger Davis may refer to:

- Roger Davis (film actor) (1884–1980), American actor
- Roger Davis (television actor) (born 1939), American actor in television series Dark Shadows and Alias Smith and Jones
- Roger Davis (cricketer) (born 1946), former county cricketer who played for Glamorgan
- Roger Davis (Pennsylvania politician) (1762–1815), member of the U.S. House of Representatives from Pennsylvania
- Roger Davis (American football) (1938–2024), former American football player
- Roger Davis (rugby union) (born 1951), Australian rugby union player
- Roger J. Davis, molecular biologist
- Roger Davis, a character from Rent (musical)
- Roger K. Davis, prison guard and candidate in the United States House of Representatives elections in Illinois, 2010
- Roger Davis, Marengo County, Alabama sheriff, imprisoned for corruption

== See also ==
- Roger Davies (disambiguation)
