= Stan Davis =

Stan or Stanley Davis may refer to:

- Stan Davis (The Southern Vampire Mysteries)
- Stan Davis, inventor of the typeface Amelia
- Stan Davis (American football) (born 1950), played in 1973 Philadelphia Eagles season
- Stanley Stewart Davis (born 1942), professor of pharmacy
- Stanley J. Davis (1908–2003), Michigan politician
- Stanley Clinton Davis (1928–2023), British politician

== See also ==
- Stanley Davies (disambiguation)
