= Cliff Davies =

Cliff Davies may refer to:

- Cliff Davies (musician) (1948–2008), British drummer known for his work with If and Ted Nugent
- Cliff Davies (rugby union) (1919–1967), Welsh international rugby player

== See also ==
- Clifford Davis (disambiguation)
