= Lyndal Davies =

Australian journalist and zoologist

- Born: 1967 (age 58–59); Brisbane, Australia
- Education: Queensland University of Technology
- Occupation: Journalist

Lyndal Davies (born 1967 in Brisbane, Australia) is a journalist. From 1991, she has been making cinema and video of wildlife inspired by Jane Goodall and Félix Rodríguez de la Fuente.

Davies is a wildlife presenter for Animal Planet. She hosts Animal Planet's Lyndal’s Lifeline where she travels to remote, countries to help wildlife sanctuaries that are in trouble and to bring an awareness about the animals that are rare in species.

Davies's love of nature began in Queensland, Australia, where she grew up. She spent her childhood rescuing animals and then went to journalism school in Queensland at Queensland University of Technology and spent the next ten years making wildlife documentaries. Most of the time her crew was only one cameraman and Davies would host, produce, and edit the documentaries herself. The money from each project went into the next project.

Nowadays she is also an Australian zoologist, documentarian and television presenter. She takes part in the series of documentaries called Lyndal's Lifeline. Lately, she was the presenter of Unearthed Series 1 and 2, where contestants compete and learn about film-making, as well as presenter and producer of Shamwari: A Wild Life.

Her work aims to popularize knowledge of wildlife. She is a graduate of Queensland University of Technology and lives in South Africa, on the Shamwari Game Reserve.
