= Ken Davis (journalist) =

American TV producer, journalist, and author

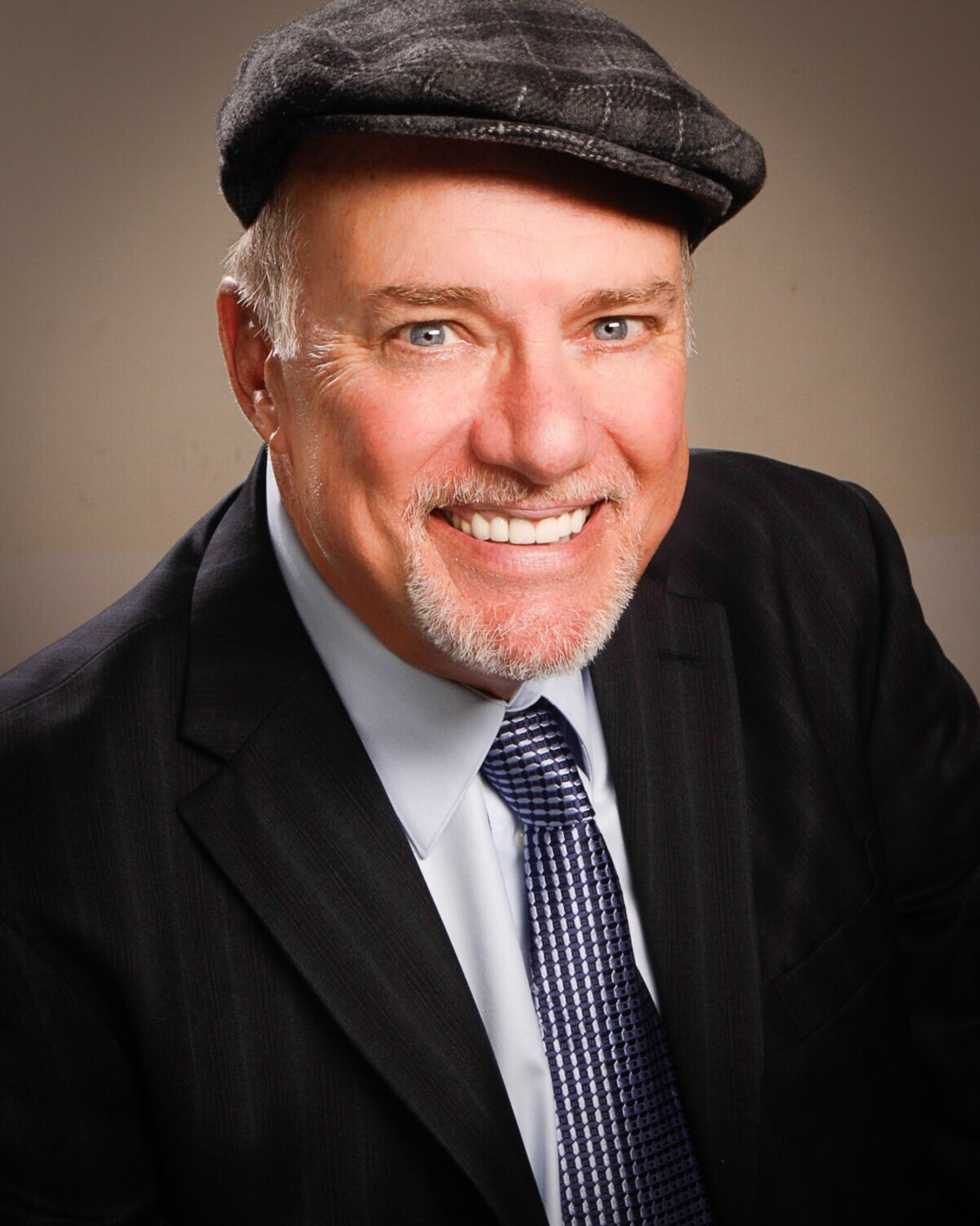
- Occupation(s): News anchor, journalist, TV producer, author

Ken Davis is a multi-Emmy-Award-winning television producer, journalist, and author. After becoming one of the youngest television news anchormen in the country, he went on to have a four-decade career in broadcasting. In 2018, he published a popular memoir about his extensive adventures in the industry.

== Career ==
Ken Davis began his broadcasting career as a radio disc-jockey in Flagstaff and Phoenix, Arizona during his college years. At the age of 20, he began anchoring the news on KOAI-TV (NBC) while completing his degree in Political Science at Northern Arizona University.

Davis became a news producer, reporter, and writer at television stations such as KSBY in San Luis Obispo, California, KTLA, KNXT (now KCBS), and KCOP in Los Angeles as well as with CBS, NBC, and PBS networks. He was a producer with the "MacNeil/Lehrer Newshour", "Personalities", "I Witness Video", "Lifestyles of the Rich and Famous", "Real TV", and "EXTRA" as well as other programs and briefly hosted the PBS program "Why in the World?"

Davis has written and produced hundreds of segments for cable channels such as Discovery, History, Biography, Animal Planet, The Travel Channel, and VH-1. He has also taught journalism classes at UCLA and USC and appeared in the Columbia motion picture, "Wrong Is Right".

== Book ==
Davis's memoir, "In Bed with Broadcasting", includes exclusive adventures with dozens of well-known figures from Barack Obama to Walter Cronkite to Phil Spector. He also writes about when he had a face-to-face encounter with the Hillside Strangler, conducted the final interview with actor Henry Fonda, and unexpectedly came across the lifeless body of actress Mae West. In addition, Davis addresses ethics in television news and explores concepts to improve the credibility of the journalism profession.

== Awards and commendations ==
Davis is the recipient of three Emmy awards, three Golden Mikes, and two Genesis Awards for outstanding news coverage. He has received commendations from the United States Congress, the California State Assembly, the Los Angeles County Board of Supervisors, and the Los Angeles Police Department for his contributions to broadcast journalism.

In 2019, Davis was inducted into the John Muir High School (Pasadena, CA) distinguished alumni Hall of Fame.

== Personal life ==
Davis and his wife, Carole, live in Southern California. He has two sons, Christopher and Philip.
