= Michael Davis (Australian footballer) =

Australian rules footballer

Personal information
- Born: 19 January 1961 (age 65)
- Original team: St Bernards
- Height: 175 cm (5 ft 9 in)
- Weight: 73 kg (161 lb)

Playing career^{1}
Years	Club	Games (Goals)
1980–1983	Essendon	4 (1)
1984	Sydney Swans	1 (1)
Total		5 (2)
- ^{1} Playing statistics correct to the end of 1984.

Michael Davis (born 19 January 1961) is a former Australian rules footballer who played with Essendon and the Sydney Swans in the Victorian Football League (VFL).

Davis, who was recruited from St Bernard's, was a rover and wingman. A left footer, Davis debuted for Essendon in their six-point win over Fitzroy at Windy Hill in the 1980 VFL season. He didn't play again until 1982 and his other two appearances came in 1983, when he was also a member of Essendon's reserves premiership team. In 1984 he played one senior game for the Sydney Swans, their round nine win over Geelong.
