= Anna U Davis =

Swedish-American artist (born 1975)

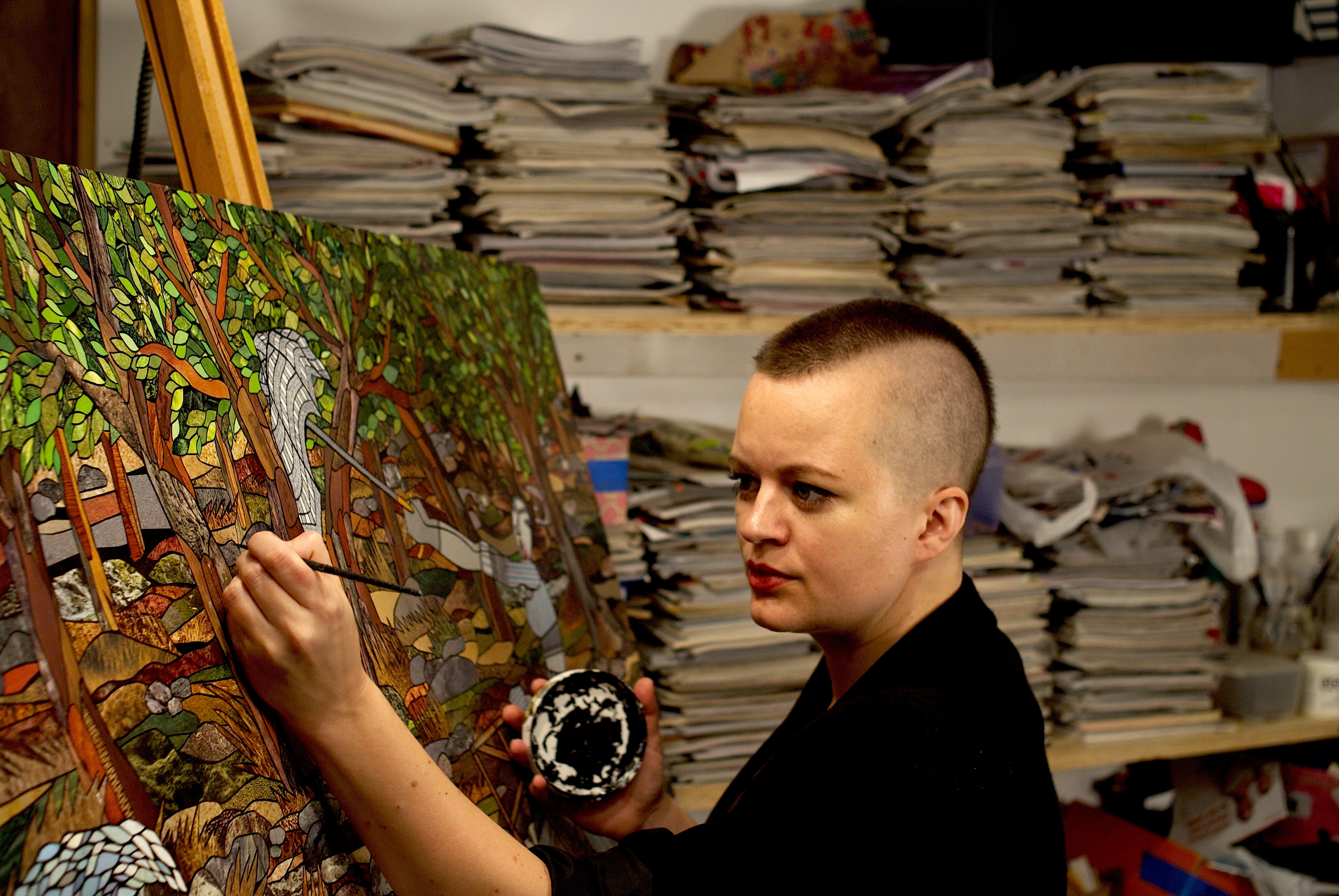
- Davis in her studio in Washington, D.C.
- Born: 1975 (age 50–51); Lund, Sweden
- Education: University of the District of Columbia (BA, 2002)
- Known for: Painting, Mixed media, Collage

Anna U Davis (born 1975) is a Swedish-American visual artist based in Washington, D.C. Her work frequently depicts gray-toned figures she refers to as "Frocasians", which have been discussed by critics in relation to race, gender, and identity. Davis has exhibited at venues including the Swedish American Museum in Chicago, the House of Sweden in Washington, D.C., and Davis Gallery in Copenhagen, Denmark.

== Early life and education ==
Anna U Davis was born in Lund, Sweden, in 1975. She is based in Washington, D.C. She studied painting at the University of the District of Columbia, where she was a student of artist Manon Cleary, and received a Bachelor of Arts degree in 2002.

== Artistic style ==
Davis works primarily in mixed-media paintings that combine acrylic paint, ink, cut paper, pumice, and appliqué textiles. Her compositions frequently feature gray-toned figures she refers to as "Frocasians". Reviews and interviews have described these figures as addressing themes of race, gender, and identity. Writing in Washington City Paper, Stephanie Rudig described Davis's work as depicting female figures in surreal scenarios that engage themes of race and gender. In an interview with IA&A at Hillyer, Davis cited Frida Kahlo, Keith Haring, Romare Bearden, and Antoni Gaudí as influences on her work.

== Career ==
Road to Recovery is a series developed by Davis in response to her breast cancer diagnosis and treatment. The works depict gray-toned figures and reference illness and recovery. A review from The Washington Post described the series as addressing experiences related to illness and recovery through figurative imagery. Davis appeared on the SVT program Sverige! in an episode broadcast in August 2019. In 2020, the journal Feminist Studies published a feature titled "Anna U. Davis: An Introduction" about Davis’s work. In 2024, Contemporary Lynx included Davis in its selection of 11 emerging artists discovered at ArtVilnius, discussing her Frocasian figures, mixed-media practice, and focus on social justice and gender relations. That year, Davis's work On Top was included in the juried exhibition A Toast to the Boogie: Art in the Name of Funk(adelic) at the DC Commission on the Arts and Humanities' I Street Gallery. The Washington Post identified the work among pieces addressing the political aspect of P-Funk's legacy.

Davis has held solo exhibitions in the United States and Europe, including at Brentwood Arts Exchange in Maryland, the House of Sweden in Washington, D.C., and Davis Gallery in Copenhagen, Denmark. Works by Davis are held in public collections including the DC Commission on the Arts and Humanities Art Bank. Davis has participated in international group exhibitions, including the 13th Havana Biennial in Cuba and Women of the Pandemic at Katara Cultural Village in Doha, Qatar.

== Selected solo exhibitions ==
- 2024 – Road to Recovery, Brentwood Arts Exchange, Brentwood, Maryland.
- 2021 – Reality Check, Swedish American Museum, Chicago.
- 2017–2018 – Witnesses, House of Sweden, Washington, D.C.
- 2018 – Damsels in Distress: Black Edge Wall Sculptures, Galerie Myrtis, Baltimore.

== Awards and residencies ==
- Pollock-Krasner Foundation Grant (2021)
- Swatch Art Peace Hotel Residency, Shanghai, China (2023)

== Collections ==
- DC Commission on the Arts and Humanities Art Bank Collection
