= Diana Davies =

Diana Davies may refer to:

- Diana Davies (actress) (born 1936), British actress
- Diana Davies (athlete) (born 1961), British high jumper
- Diana Davies (photographer) (born 1938), American photographer
- Diana Davies (swimmer), Welsh swimmer
