= Fred Davis (footballer, born 1913) =

English footballer

Personal information
- Full name: Frederick Alexander Davies
- Date of birth: 1913
- Place of birth: Hackney, England
- Position: Outside left

Senior career*
Years	Team	Apps	(Gls)
–1936	Walthamstow Avenue		
1936	Clapton Orient	2	(0)
- Walthamstow Avenue
- * Club domestic league appearances and goals

Frederick Alexander Davies was an English amateur footballer who played in the Football League for Clapton Orient as an outside left.
