= Ernest Davies (aviator) =

Australian aviator (1890 - 1962)

Ernest Edgar Davies
- Born: 18 March 1890; Kerang, Victoria, Australia
- Died: 23 January 1962 (aged 71); Bairnsdale, Victoria, Australia
- Military career
- Allegiance: Australia
- Branch: Australian Army
- Service years: 1915–1919
- Rank: Captain
- Units: 4th Light Horse Regiment; No. 2 Squadron AFC
- Conflicts: World War I; Western Front
- Awards: Distinguished Flying Cross
- Other work: Solicitor

Captain Ernest Edgar Davies DFC (18 March 1890 – 23 January 1962) was an Australian First World War flying ace credited with seven aerial victories.

== Early life and background ==
Davies was born in Kerang, Victoria, the son of John Herbert Davies. He graduated Master of Laws from University of Melbourne, and was admitted as a solicitor of the state in June 1914.

== World War I ==
In November 1915 Davies enlisted into the 4th Light Horse Regiment at Seymour. He later transferred to the Australian Flying Corps and after flight training at RAAF Laverton, was commissioned as a lieutenant in May 1917. Davies sailed for England in June 1917, and was appointed a flying officer in the British Royal Flying Corps in December. He served with No. 2 Squadron AFC in France from early 1918.

Flying a S.E.5a single-seat fighter Davies accounted for seven enemy aircraft between 27 August and 4 November, sharing two with Captain Eric Douglas Cummings. On 3 June 1919 he was awarded the Distinguished Flying Cross "in recognition of distinguished services rendered during the war".

=== List of aerial victories ===
Combat record
No.	Date/Time	Aircraft/ Serial No.	Opponent	Result	Location	Notes
1	27 August 1918 @ 1055	S.E.5a (D6860)	Fokker D.VII	Destroyed	South of Douai—Lécluse	
2	15 September 1918 @ 1720	S.E.5a (D6860)	Albatros C	Destroyed	West of Macquart	Shared with Captain Eric Douglas Cummings.
3	1 October 1918 @ 0925	S.E.5a (D6860)	C	Out of control	Ligny	
4	1 October 1918 @ 1415	S.E.5a (E5765)	LVG C	Out of control	Antoing	Shared with Captain Eric Douglas Cummings.
5	4 November 1918 @ 0810	S.E.5a (E5765)	LVG C	Destroyed	Ellezelles—Ronse	
6	4 November 1918 @ 1300	S.E.5a (E5765)	Fokker D.VII	Out of control	Houtaing	
7	4 November 1918 @ 1300	S.E.5a (E5765)	Fokker D.VII	Out of control	Houtaing	

== Post-war life ==
Davies returned to Australia in late 1919 and returned to his legal practice, initially based at Swan Hill, and then from Bank Place, Melbourne from the 1930s. He continued to fly, but suffered the embarrassment of being fined £50 in August 1932 for flying after having allowed his aircraft registration and flying licence to expire.

On 23 January 1962 fishing equipment was found on the banks of the Mitchell River at Bairnsdale. After a search the bodies of Davies and his secretary Mrs. Grace Stewart were discovered in the river. It was assumed that both drowned after one fell into the water and the other attempted a rescue.
