= Michael Davis (author) =

English political author (born 1946)

Michael Davis (born July 1946) is the founder of businesses and non-profit foundations supporting the resolution of political conflicts. His book Life after Democracy suggests a new relationship between political leaders and the public to reverse the global rise of violence and authoritarian controls.

== Background and early life ==
Davis was born in July 1946 in England. He graduated from Magdalene College, Cambridge University, in 1968 with a master's degree in natural sciences. He then led the Cambridge Rabies Project, a Cambridge University approved research programme in Salta, Argentina, in 1968–69. The project investigated ways of reducing vampire bat populations without harming other species. The work was funded by the World Health Organization and the Argentine Government.

== International relations and public service ==
From 1976 to 1978, Davis was a consultant to the World Health Organization. He advised and assisted health services in Brazil, Peru, Ecuador, Venezuela, Honduras, Costa Rica, Guatemala, Uganda, Philippines and Malaysia.

In 1979 he created and led The Soviet Alternative, an initiative to moderate the arms race by reducing Soviet earnings from gold mining. After discovering that the gold price was being increased by political interventions, a series of detailed alerts was issued, warning investors that the price had been driven to record highs by market manipulations. After the warnings were issued the price of gold fell rapidly and remained below the 1980 peak for over 30 years (based on world gold prices adjusted for inflation). This is believed to have reduced the pressures on forced labour in Soviet gold mines and reduced the resources available for arms production.

From 1982 to 1984, he co-founded and served as director of the Council for Arms Control, a coalition of leaders in politics, the armed forces, universities and the church. The Council promoted multilateral arms reductions at a time when others were campaigning for unilateral disarmament. In June 1982, he was the accredited representative and speaker for The Council for Arms Control at the United Nations Special Session on Disarmament at the UN General Assembly. The Council for Arms Control was registered with The Charity Commission in London in 1981.

In 1984, he became the director of the Institute for Negotiation and Conciliation, registered with The Charity Commission. Trustees included Lord Blaker and General Sir Hugh Beach.

From 1983 to 1988, he founded and served as director of The Foundation for International Conciliation, based in Geneva. He led confidential negotiations with political leaders in many parts of the world to resolve national and international conflicts. The foundation was registered in the Canton of Geneva. Foundation board members included Ambassador Olivier Long former Swiss Ambassador to London and Ambassador Felix Schnyder former Swiss Ambassador to Washington and UN High Commissioner for Refugees. The Foundation cooperated with other international organisations including the United Nations through Ambassador Rikhi Jaipal, Assistant Secretary General of the UN, who served as a Special Adviser.

In 2002, he founded and developed the "Out of Conflict" initiative. He established political neutrality for its operations by relocating to Switzerland.

In 2014, Davis published Life After Democracy in English, French, Arabic and Chinese and developed the Live Forum TV concept.

In September 2014, the Live Forum Foundation was established and registered in Geneva to facilitate the use of Live Forum TV, one of the tools introduced in Life After Democracy as a neutral and independent public service.

== Business career ==
From 1969 to 2005, Davis founded and led 15 companies in electronics, telecommunications, television and video communications, all of which supported his public service commitments. The companies included:

Davis Safety Controls Ltd
Windsor Television Ltd
The Cable Corporation Ltd
Cable Telecom Ltd
Birmingham Cable Ltd
Internet Technology Ltd
National Network Ltd
Trinity Development Corporation Ltd
Sheffield Cable Media Ltd
Business Television Corporation Ltd

The first company designed, developed and installed systems to support the elderly and disabled. A number of later companies won cable television and telecommunications franchises in competition with some of the world's largest TV and telecoms companies.

Later he founded a company to preserve buildings of historic and architectural importance and in 1999 won the "What House" award for The Best House in Great Britain.
