= Llewelyn Davies =

Llewelyn Davies is the formal surname of the family whose boys inspired J. M. Barrie to create the characters of Peter Pan and the Lost Boys:

- Llewelyn Davies, Arthur, father of the boys
- Llewelyn Davies, Sylvia, mother of the boys

The Llewelyn Davies boys, in order of birth:

- Llewelyn Davies, George
- Llewelyn Davies, Jack
- Llewelyn Davies, Peter
- Llewelyn Davies, Michael
- Llewelyn Davies, Nico

== Other people ==
- Llewellyn Davies (1894–1965), English cricketer
- Llewelyn Davies (footballer) (1881–1961) was a Wrexham A.F.C. and Wales international footballer
- Llewelyn Davies (aviator) (1898-1918) was a World War I flying ace; see List of World War I aces credited with 5 victories
- Richard Llewelyn-Davies, Baron Llewelyn-Davies (1912–1981) was a British architect and a cousin of the boys.
- Moya Llewelyn-Davies (1881-1943) Richard's mother.
