= Jude Davies =

British academic

Jude Davies (born 19 February 1965) is a British scholar of American studies who is Professor of American Literature and Culture in the Department of English, Creative Writing and American Studies at the University of Winchester. His research concerns American literature (especially the work of Theodore Dreiser), post-1990 American cinema, editing, and Americanisation.

Davies was educated at University College London and the University of York. His published work includes 1997's Gender, Ethnicity, and Sexuality in Contemporary American Film, co-authored with Carol R. Smith; 2001's Diana, A Cultural History: Gender, Race, Nation and the People's Princess; 2004's Issues in Americanisation and Culture, which he co-edited with Neil Campbell and George McKay; a 2011 collection of Dreiser's political writing; and Falling Down, a 2013 book about the film of the same name.

His 2007 paper "Stupid White Men: Toward a Trans-Atlantic Politics of Stupidity", published in the journal REAL: Yearbook of Research in English and American Literature, won the Arthur Miller Institute Prize for best journal article. Davies was quoted in Times Higher Education as saying "The idea behind 'Stupid white men' sprung from my desire to understand how anti-intellectualism works as a political virtue in the US, through examples such as the personae of George W. Bush and the ways that figures such as Al Gore, John Kerry and Hillary Clinton are at times represented negatively when showing levels of intelligence."
