= Geraint Davies =

Geraint Davies may refer to:

- Geraint Davies (Labour politician) (born 1960), incumbent British Labour-Cooperative Member of Parliament for Swansea West; former British Labour Member of Parliament for Croydon Central
- Geraint Davies (Plaid Cymru politician) (born 1948), Plaid Cymru former member of the Welsh Assembly
- Geraint Davies (rugby league) (born 1986), Welsh rugby league footballer
- Geraint Talfan Davies (born 1943), chairman of the Institute of Welsh Affairs and former Controller of BBC Wales
- Geraint Wyn Davies, Welsh-American actor

== See also ==
- Geraint
- Geraint (given name)
