= Alexander Davis =

Alexander Davis may refer to:

- Alexander Davis (politician) (1833–1889), American politician
- Alexander Jackson Davis (1803–1892), American architect
- Alexander Kelso Davis, American 19th-century politician
