= Mervyn Davies (judge) =

British judge

Sir David Herbert Mervyn Davies, MC, TD (17 January 1918 – 12 May 2015) was a British barrister and High Court judge who sat in the Chancery Division from 1982 to 1993. He is best remembered for ordering the sequestration of assets belonging to the National Union of Mineworkers during the miners' strike of 1984–1985.
