= Ron Davies =

Ron Davies or Ronald Davies may refer to:

- Ronald Davies (judge) (1904–1996), American judge
- Ron Davies (Tasmanian politician) (1919–1980), Australian politician from Tasmania
- R. E. G. Davies (Ronald Edward George Davies, 1921–2011), English air transport historian
- Ron Davies (photographer) (1921–2013), Welsh photographer
- Ron Davies (Western Australian politician) (1926–2011), Australian Labor politician and opposition leader from Western Australia
- Ron Davies (footballer, born 1932) (1932–2007), Welsh football defender who played for Cardiff and Southampton
- Ron Davies (footballer, born 1942) (1942–2013), Welsh international football striker who played for Norwich and Southampton
- Ron Davies (songwriter) (1946–2003), American songwriter, brother to Gail Davies
- Ron Davies (Welsh politician) (born 1946), former Welsh and British politician

== See also ==
- Ronald Davis (disambiguation)
