= Donald E. Davis =

American author and historian

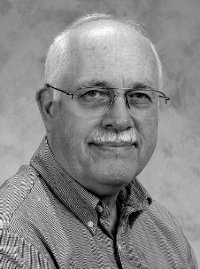
- Education: San Francisco State College; Indiana University Bloomington (MA, PhD)
- Occupations: Historian, writer
- Spouse: Mary Davis

Donald E. Davis is an American writer and historian. Previously, Davis was a professor at Illinois State University.

== Early life and education ==
Davis earned his bachelor's degree from San Francisco State College. He attended graduate school at Indiana University Bloomington, where he obtained his MA and PhD, focusing on Russian history. Davis wrote his dissertation on Vladimir Lenin and theories of warfare, especially those of Clausewitz. At San Francisco State College, Harold H. Fisher mentored him; at Indiana University Bloomington, he studied with Robert F. Byrnes and Robert H. Ferrell.

== Career ==
Davis edited, No East or West: The Memoirs of Paul B. Anderson. He coauthored The First Cold War: The Legacy of Woodrow Wilson in U.S. - Soviet Relations with Eugene P. Trani, an American diplomatic historian. Additionally, Distorted Mirrors; The Reporter Who Knew Too Much; A Bridge to Somewhere; WHEN THE WORLD DIES: Life and Death in an Age of Infamy. In 2004, Davis retired from Illinois State University after 40 years of teaching courses in European, Russian, and Soviet history. He was one of the university’s longest serving faculty members in the history department. He is a member of the American Association for Slavic, East European, and Eurasian Studies (AASEEES) and has published in its journal, the Slavic Review ("The American YMCA and the Russian Revolution" volume 33, number 3, pages 469–91) as well as in many other scholarly journals and anthologies. His personal archive, the "Davis Collection," is at the Hoover Institution, Stanford University.

== Personal life ==
Davis is married to Mary Davis, a retired elementary school teacher and director of a multi-county rural transport system, SHOW BUS. The couple has two children, a son and daughter.

== Bibliography ==
- No East or West: The Memoirs of Paul B. Anderson (1985)
- The First Cold War: The Legacy of Woodrow Wilson in U.S. - Soviet Relations (2002 - also published in Russian and Chinese editions)
- Distorted Mirrors: Americans and Their Relations with Russia and China in the Twentieth Century (2009 - also published in Russian, Spanish, and Chinese editions)
- The Reporter Who Knew Too Much: Harrison Salisbury and the New York Times (2012)
- A Bridge to Somewhere: The Tragedy of the Messina Strait Bridge Project (2014)
- When the World Dies: Life and Death in an Age of Infamy (2026, Torchflame Books)
