= Oscar Davies =

English barrister

- Born: United Kingdom
- Occupation: Barrister

Oscar Davies is an English barrister at Garden Court Chambers in London. Their practice encompasses civil litigation employment, discrimination, education, public law and human rights.

Davies is notable for being the first openly non-binary barrister in the UK. Davies uses they/them pronouns. In 2021, they were reported to be the first barrister to have the gender-neutral title Mx displayed on a chambers board. Davies has also said they would prefer if genders did not exist.

== Education and career ==
Davies studied French and History at King's College London, graduating in 2016. They did the GDL and Bar course at City, University of London, and were called to the Bar in 2018. Davies previously practised at Lamb Chambers before joining Garden Court Chambers in December 2023.

Their practice includes civil litigation, employment, discrimination, education, housing and human rights law.

Davies has been ranked as a Leading Junior by the Legal 500 in education law, and is also ranked by Chambers and Partners for employment law.

== Trans Legal Clinic ==
Davies does legal work for the Trans Legal Clinic. In 2025, Davies worked with the Trans Legal Clinic, founded by Olivia Campbell-Cavendish, as part of the legal team representing Dr Victoria McCloud, the UK's first openly transgender judge.

They appealed to the European Court of Human Rights in regards to the Supreme Court of the United Kingdom’s ruling that the word woman refers to "biological women".

== Awards and Recognition ==
Davies won the LGBTQ+ Champion of the Year award at the Legal 500 UK ESG Awards in 2024 and again in 2026. In 2025, Davies received the Changemaker Award at the King's College London Distinguished Alumni Awards in recognition of their advocacy for transgender and non-binary rights.

== Media ==
PinkNews reported that Davies stated the UK Supreme Court 2025 ruling on biological sex was being used to exclude transgender people.

In April 2026, Legal Business interviewed Davies about their legal career, the impact of the Supreme Court's decision in For Women Scotland, and their work on LGBTQ+ rights.

Davies also operates the social media platform @nonbinarybarrister, where they publish educational content on discrimination law and legal rights, particularly those affecting transgender and non-binary people.

== Publications ==
In February 2025, Davies published Language as a Cage and a Tool: Drafting Non-Binary into UK Legislation in the academic journal GenIUS, examining the legal recognition of non-binary identities in the United Kingdom.

In November 2025, they published Lessons learnt: Unbinding the binary at the Bar in Counsel magazine.

In June 2026, it was announced that Jessica Kingsley Publishers would publish Davies' book Queers Know Your Rights, a guide to LGBTQ+ legal rights in the United Kingdom, in 2027.
