= Donald M. Davis (mathematician) =

American mathematician

Donald Davis
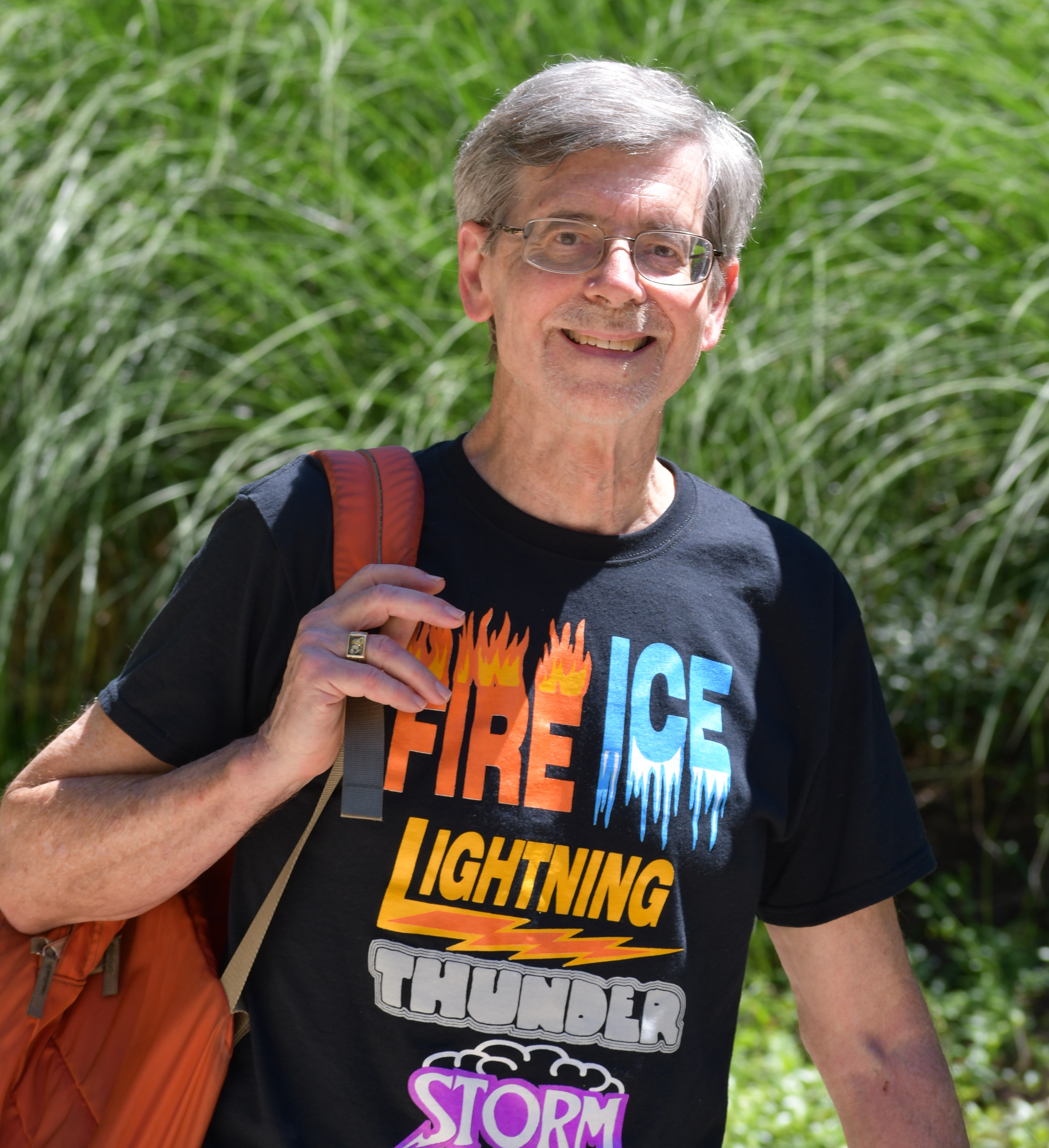
- Don Davis at ARML contest, June 2022
- Born: 7 May 1945; Fort Knox, Kentucky
- Education: MIT; Stanford University
- Scientific career
- Fields: Mathematics
- Workplaces: Lehigh University
- Doctoral advisor: R. James Milgram

Donald M. Davis (born 7 May 1945) is an American mathematician specializing in algebraic topology.

Davis received a B.S. from MIT in 1967 and a PhD in mathematics at Stanford in 1972, directed by R. James Milgram. After postdoctoral positions at University of California, San Diego and Northwestern University, he began a 50-year career at Lehigh University in 1974. In 2012 he was named an inaugural Fellow of the American Mathematical Society. Since 2002, he has been Executive Editor of Homology, Homotopy and Applications.

== Research ==
Davis has published in algebraic topology, differential topology, topological robotics, and combinatorial number theory. He is an expert on immersions of projective spaces, and maintains a website with all known results for real projective spaces. He computed the $v_1$-periodic homotopy groups of all compact simple Lie groups.

== Coaching ==
In 1993 Davis started the Lehigh Valley Math Team. In 2005, 2009, 2010, 2011, 2024 and 2025, they were national champions in the American Regions Math League (ARML). They have finished second or third in ARML seven other times. They won the Harvard/MIT Math Tournament (HMMT) in 2023 and 2024, and the Princeton University Math Competition (PUMaC) in 2009, 2010, 2012, 2023, 2024, and 2025.

== Running ==
From 1977 through 2009, Davis competed in marathon and ultramarathon races. He was the overall winner of ultramarathon races of 31 to 78 miles in the 1970s, 1980s, 1990s, and 2000s.

== Selected publications ==
- Davis, Donald M. (2004). The Nature and Power of Mathematics. Dover Publication. ISBN 0-486-43896-1.
- Davis, Donald M. (1984). "A strong nonimmersion theorem for real projective spaces". Annals of Mathematics. 2. 120: 517–528. doi:10.2307/1971086. JSTOR 1971086.
- Davis, Donald M. (2002). "From Representation Theory to Homotopy Groups". Memoirs Amer Math Soc. 759.
