= Davis (surname) =

Family name

- Pronunciation: /ˈdeɪvɪs/ DAY-vis plural Davises possessive Davis's, Davises'

Origin
- Meaning: Descendant from Dyfed alt. Son of David
- Region of origin: Wales

Other names
- Variant forms: David, Davies, Davison

Davis is a surname of Welsh origin. It may be a corruption of Dyfed. Dyfed is recorded as a surname as late as the twelfth century, e.g. Gwynfard Dyfed, born 1175. Dafydd (generally translated into English as David) appears as a given name in the thirteenth century, e.g. Dafydd ap Gruffydd (1238–1283), Prince of Wales, and Dafydd ab Edmwnd (fl. c. 1450–1497), a Welsh poet. Alternatively, Davis may be a patronymic surname (son of David).

According to the 2000 United States census, it is the seventh most frequently reported surname, accounting for 0.48% of the population, preceding Garcia and following Miller.
