= Charlotte Davies =

American model and actress

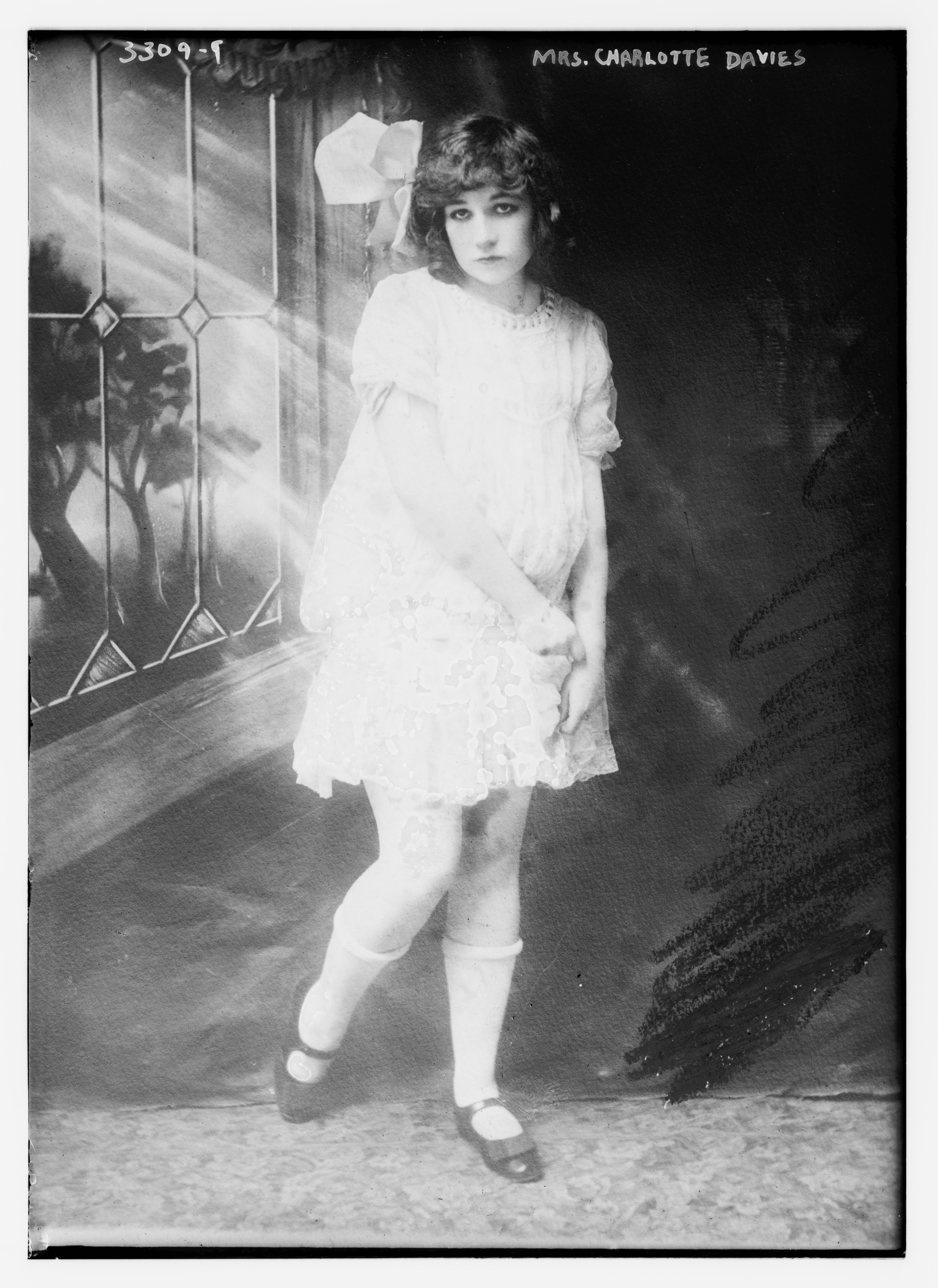
- Other names: Charlotte Mayburne, Charlotte Briggs
- Occupation(s): model, actress
- Known for: "Innocence" painting
- Spouses: Harold Porter (m. 1906; ann. 1912) Victor Briggs (m. 1912; ann. 1914) Lisle Sullivan (m. 1927)

Charlotte Davies (c. 1892 – 1970) was an American model and actress known for her posed photographs.

== Early life ==
Davies was born in Cleveland, Ohio, around 1892 to George Davies and Hannah Bradburg. She moved to New York around 1910.

== Career ==
Davies was a model whose photographs show her in babydoll style outfits, staring alluringly at the camera. She modeled for Harrison Fisher. William Hammerstein gave her a job in his theater where her only job was to "pose onstage and be statuesque." Davies held a variety of poses while holding a picture frame around herself. Variety lumped her in with what they called "a host of... women freaks" and her performance was critiqued as "a vulgar display of robust undraped femininity."

In 1914 she revealed that she was the nude model for the painting "Innocence" which attracted attention and was rumored to have hung in the White House. She would sometimes headline at Hammerstein's while recreating this portrait. Later in the year she was performing at the Boston Theater in their "dancing carnival" where her act which she performed with Ernst Orr was described as "blue" and said it would "probably be dismissed before the week is over."

== Personal life and divorce ==
Davies was married to Harold Porter, with whom she had a daughter, Jewell, in 1909. Davies reported that Briggs knew she was already married but threatened to shoot her if she did not marry him after she had known him three weeks. Davies was the subject of a national scandal in 1914 when she petitioned Briggs for divorce. During the proceedings he supposedly determined that she was still married to her first husband. Mr. Briggs objected to his wife's modeling sessions and insisted on an annulment, where she would have to forgo alimony because of her previous marriage. The annulment was finalized in October 1914. She married Lisle Sullivan in 1927.
