= Shaun Davies =

Shaun or Sean Davies may refer to:

- Shaun Davies (activist), Aboriginal language activist and linguist
- Shaun Davies (rugby union) (born 1989), American rugby union player and coach
- Shaun Davies (politician), British politician
- Sean Davies (footballer) (born 1985), English footballer
- Sean Davies (born 1973), Zimbabwean cricketer
- Sean Davis (boxer) (born 1990), English boxer
- Sean Davies, protagonist in the Runaway TV serial

== See also ==
- Sean Davis (disambiguation)
