= Fred Davis (entrepreneur) =

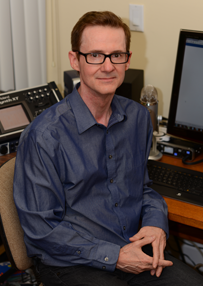
- Fred Davis, 2013
- Born: June 17, 1955 (age 71); New Haven, CT
- Occupations: Author, media executive, entrepreneur
- Known for: Being an author, speaker, scientist, technology advocate, and futurist

Frederic Emery Davis (born June 17, 1955), known as Fred Davis, is a veteran US technology writer and publisher who served as editor of A+'' magazine, MacUser, PC Magazine and PC Week; personal computer pioneer; technologist; and entrepreneur involved in the startups of Wired, CNET, Ask Jeeves, Lumeria, Jaduka, and Grabbit.

== Childhood ==
Davis was born at the Yale New Haven Hospital while his father was enrolled at Yale. Davis's father was Dr. Donald Davis (deceased), an IBM Fellow and the creator of the "learning organization" management practice (while a professor at the University of Utrecht in the Netherlands). Davis's mother was Doris Davis (deceased), an educator, artist, and longtime director of the Upward Bound project at Bowdoin College, in Brunswick, Maine.

== Education ==
Davis attended Friends Academy, in Locust Valley, New York, from kindergarten through sixth grade, while his mother was an English teacher and assistant principal. In 1966 Davis enrolled at Eaglebrook School, in Deerfield, Massachusetts, where he spent grades 7 through 9 and graduated in 1970. In 1966 Davis, then age 11, learned computer programming, by participating in the testing and development of the BASIC computer language via a time-sharing hookup to Dartmouth College, where BASIC was being developed. In 1970 Davis enrolled at Northfield Mt. Hermon School, in Northfield, Massachusetts, where he spent his sophomore and junior years. He spent his senior year of high school at Collins Brook School, in Freeport, Maine. The school was modeled after and run by former educators of the progressive Summerhill School in Suffolk, England. Davis graduated in 1973 from Collins Brook, where his senior class consisted of only six people. In 1978 Davis enrolled in Antioch College and completed his B.A. in botany. The Wall St. Journal described Davis as "a teen-age prodigy who earned a B.A. in only one year." In 1979 Davis continued at Antioch College, and he earned his M.S. in Ecosystems Management in 1981. In 1980 Davis enrolled at Union Institute & University as a degree candidate for a PhD in Information Technology. His dissertation was titled "Computer Assisted Publishing," and although Davis did not complete his PhD, the dissertation formed the groundwork for a book he coauthored—Desktop Publishing—one of the first books to be published on that topic.

== Early business ventures ==
In 1974 Davis bought Lougee's, a greenhouse and florist business in Belfast, Maine. He expanded the business to include North Star Orchids, an orchid nursery that was a major importer of orchids in 1975 and 1976. During that time, he designed and established a commercial plant tissue culture laboratory for North Star Orchids; the lab was one of the first commercial plant tissue culture labs to use a laminar flow hood based on millipore filters for aseptic lab work, at a time when glove boxes were the standard aseptic tissue culture work areas. Davis invented a new type of plant tissue culture vessel based on millipore filters for respiration, and that invention was published in Orchid Review, where it received international attention. It was cited in subsequent scientific papers and eventually became part of the standard design of almost all types of labware that needed to provide aseptic respiration.

== History with computers ==
In the late '70s, Davis moved from Maine to San Francisco, where he became one of the early personal computer pioneers working with CPM-based systems. Davis bought an original Apple II in 1977 and emerged as an early Apple II programmer, due to his prior knowledge of BASIC, the language that computer used. Davis was among the first computer engineers to successfully connect microcomputers to mainframes, connecting his Apple II with Stanford's DEC PDP-10 while conducting research on database publishing at Stanford. Davis also served as a computer consultant to large corporations and venture capitalists in the early days of the industry.

== Magazine publishing ==
Davis held several executive positions at technology magazines from 1983 to 2002. Davis was the editor of A+, MacUser, PC Magazine, and PC Week; a columnist and writer for Wired; and the publisher of dig_iT.

=== ZD, A+, MacUser ===
In 1983 Davis became one of the founders of Ziff-Davis's computer publishing division and worked on the startup of ZD's first computer publication, A+, which rapidly became the leading publication about Apple computers. Later, during Fred's tenure as editor-in-chief, A+ won the Computer Press Association award for Best Computer Magazine. From A+, Davis moved over to serve as editor-in-chief of its sister magazine MacUser, where he founded MacUser Labs. He oversaw the development of the magazine during its period of greatest growth, bringing it up to parity with Macworld.

=== PC Magazine, PC Week ===
Next, Davis joined PC Magazine, which, at the time, was the world's leading computer publication in terms of revenue and circulation, with an annual revenue of approximately $250 million. As editor of PC Magazine and director of PC Magazine Labs, he helped develop benchmarks and scripts for testing thousands of products under review. Later, as editor of PC Week, he founded PC Week Labs and developed industry-standard benchmark tests for corporate computing. After leaving PC Week, which was located in Massachusetts, to return to California, Davis helped launch and served as a columnist for several other Ziff-Davis publications, including Windows Sources, Computer Life, Family PC, and the ZD Personal Computing newspaper supplement.

=== Wired ===
In 1992 Davis worked with Wired CEO Louis Rosetto on the launch of Wired magazine and was part of the original "Wired Brain Trust." After Wired, Davis worked with CNET CEO Halsey Minor as an original member of the CNET startup team, where he helped develop both television and online strategies.

=== dig_iT ===
In 2001 Davis and computer publishing pioneer David Bunnell founded Prosumer Media, the publisher of dig_iT, a magazine focused on "the digital lifestyle."

== Internet ==
Davis was an early Internet pioneer who launched one of the Internet's first curated search and discovery sites, Weblust.com. Early users of Weblust included Ralph Nader and Avram Miller.

=== NetGuide ===
Working with CMP Media, Davis led a team that developed an advanced consumer portal and Internet search site named NetGuide. It included multimedia features and games such as "Where's Barlowe?" based on the travelings of John Perry Barlow. These features were developed by Marc Canter, founder of MacroMind/MacroMedia, and David Biedney, a highly acclaimed graphic artist. NetGuide was one of the first major consumer Web projects to use Java. One of the programmers on the NetGuide project was Craig Newmark, who later went on to start Craigslist.

=== CNET ===
In 1994 Davis joined CNET during its early startup stage. He was the first computer industry person to join the CNET team, which at the time consisted of Halsey Minor, Shelby Bonnie, and Bettina Cisneros. Davis worked with Fox Network cofounder Kevin Wendle and former Disney creative associate Dan Baker to produce CNET's four pilot television programs about computers, technology, and the Internet.

=== Ask Jeeves ===
In 1996 Davis helped launch Ask Jeeves (now Ask.com), after venture capitalist Garrett Gruener introduced Davis to David Warthen, the founding CEO.

=== Lumeria ===
In 1998 Davis was the CEO and founder of Lumeria, an infomediary company involved in identity management; identity commerce; consumer privacy; and helping consumers own, control, and get value from their personal information. Lumeria's identity management business was designed to provide a secure way for individuals to protect and share their personal information, with Lumeria acting as an agent on their behalf to protect their information and extract value from that information, which was stored in Lumeria's SuperProfile distributed secure XML database. Lumeria had a controversial subsidiary, Lumeria Ad Network, that replaced ads in a user's browser with ads from that person's own ad network.

=== PrivaTel, Jaduka ===
In 2005 Davis founded and served as the CEO of PrivaTel, a wholly owned subsidiary of Network Enhanced Telecom, LLP (also known as Network IP), based in Dallas, Texas. While at PrivaTel, Davis developed three main services: My Private Line, a prepaid calling card with disposable phone numbers that could be used for privacy protection when people are not comfortable providing their actual phone number and providing the ability to turn individual numbers off or direct them to go directly to voicemail; Click-and-Connect, a service that enables someone to initiate a phone call from almost every Web page or application; and CallsAd, a service in which classified ads are sold with a temporary contact number, enabling the seller to keep personal numbers private and turn the contact number off after the sale. After Davis's departure, the company was renamed Jaduka and it dropped the privacy products to focus exclusively on the Click-and-Connect service.

=== Grabbit ===
In 2009 Davis founded Grabbit, with Lisa Padilla and Peter Karnig. Grabbit is an open source social media platform that integrates social network and other content streams into a single stream that can be filtered by social networks, content sources, keywords, users, and so on. Users can add many types of real-time streams, updates, and alerts such as RSS feeds, e-mail alerts, news alerts, blog alerts, alarms and reminders, shopping alerts, and more across a broad range of social networks, information, media, and commerce. Grabbit also gives users a powerful set of tools for managing and discovering friends, contacts, and groups of contacts across a wide variety of social and business networks. Grabbit was built with Drupal, and the open source project and source code is published on GitHub. In partnership with Cognition, Grabbit developed new semantic technology to analyze social media, blog posts, friends, locations, media consumption, product purchases, brand preferences, and other data. As a result of this work, Davis filed a patent application titled "Semantically Generating Personalized Recommendations Based on Social Feeds to a User in Real-Time and Display Methods Thereof."

== Other work ==
From 1996 to mid-1997, Davis served as director of Strategic Development for CMP Media, during the period leading up to its successful IPO, in August 1997. While working for CMP Media's CEO, Ken Cron, on long-range business strategies, Davis also wrote articles and columns in various CMP publications, including Windows Magazine, Home PC, and Computer Reseller News.

Davis was a columnist for the San Jose Mercury News and was the US columnist for EYE-COM, one of Japan's leading computer magazines. Davis was also a regular technology commentator for National Public Radio's All Things Considered and is the former cohost of the radio call-in show On Computers, with John Dvorak, Gina Smith, and Leo LaPorte. Davis also served as president of the Computer Institute, a nonprofit scientific and cultural foundation involved in education research and the study of human/computer ecology. Davis was also the founder of the Festival of Computer and Multimedia Arts (CoMA) in San Francisco.

Davis is the author of more than a dozen computer books, including The Complete IBM Personal Computer—the first hardware expansion guide to the IBM PC, published in the early 1980s. His 1985 book, Desktop Publishing (with coauthors John Barry and Michael Wiesenberg), helped popularize the term and received an award from the Computer Press Association. The New York Times hailed Davis's Windows 3.1 Bible as "the best" book on the topic. Davis also developed the Windows Bible CD-ROM, released in early 1994. The Windows 95 Bible was released in April 1996, and his Windows 98 Bible (with coauthor Kip Crosby) was published in April 1998.

Davis has been named one of the most influential people in the tech industry by several publications in both the US and Japan and is listed in Marquis Who's Who in America. Davis has been widely quoted in publications such as Business Week, The Wall Street Journal, The New York Times, USA Today, U.S. News & World Report, and Atlantic Monthly and has appeared on many radio and television programs, including NPR's All Things Considered, CBS Evening News, and ABC News Tonight.

Most recently, Davis has been exploring IPTV and Google Glass.
