= Steve Davis (businessman) =

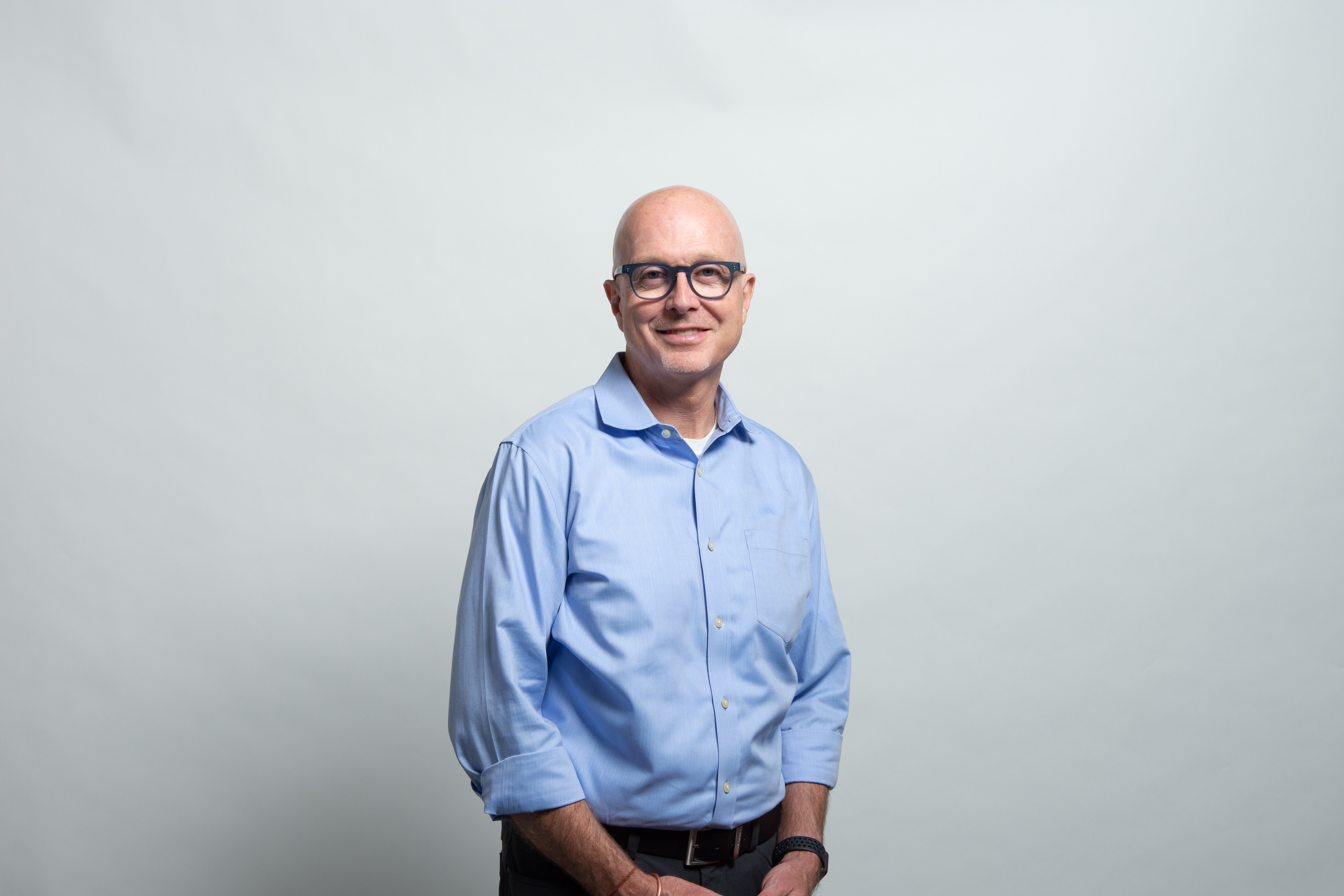
- Occupations: Social activist, academic, business executive
- Known for: Work in the fields of social innovation and global health

Steve Davis is a social activist, business executive and academic in the field of social innovation. He holds a faculty appointment at the Stanford Graduate School of Business teaching social innovation and currently serves as Senior Strategic Advisor and Interim Director China Country Office at the Bill & Melinda Gates Foundation. He is also a Distinguished Fellow at the World Economic Forum, is a member of the Council on Foreign Relations, and serves on several boards and advisory groups. He also serves as the co-chair of the World Health Organization's Digital Health Technical Advisory Group. Steve is the author of Undercurrents: Channeling Outrage to Spark Practical Activism, published by Wiley October 6, 2020, which won a Gold Star award from Axiom Books. He lives with his family in Seattle, Washington.

== Early life ==
Davis grew up in a large family in the small ranching community of Dillon, Montana, before attending Princeton University. Following his undergraduate studies he pursued a Princeton-in-Asia Fellowship teaching literature in Taiwan, after which he studied Chinese Studies at the University of Washington and Beijing University, and Chinese and human rights law at Columbia University. He also worked on refugee and human rights issues for many years.

== Career summary ==
Previously, he was an attorney for K&L Gates (formerly Preston Gates & Ellis); CEO at Corbis, a digital media pioneer owned by Bill Gates; interim CEO of Infectious Disease Research Institute, a global health organization; director of social innovation at McKinsey & Company, a global consultancy; and most recently as president and CEO of PATH, a health innovation organization. He speaks and writes regularly about the intersection of innovation, technology and social impact, and has extensive experience working with China.
