= Stanley Davies =

Stanley or Stan Davies may refer to:

- Stanley Webb Davies (1894–1978), English furniture maker
- Stan Davies (footballer) (1898–1972), Welsh footballer
- Stan Davies (rugby union), Welsh international rugby union player
- Stan Gebler Davies (1943–1994), Irish journalist

== See also ==
- Stan Davis (disambiguation)
