= Owen Davies =

Owen Davies may refer to:

- Owen Davies (Baptist minister) (1840–1929), Welsh Baptist minister
- Owen Davies (historian) (born 1969), English historian
- Owen Davies (umpire) (1914–1978), West Indian cricket umpire
- Owen Picton Davies (1872–1940), Welsh businessman and politician
- Owen Picton Davies (journalist) (1882–1970), Welsh journalist

== See also ==
- Owen Davis
- Owen Davis, Jr.
