= Alfred Davies =

Alfred Davies may refer to:

== Politicians ==
- Alfred Davies (Carmarthen MP) (1848–1907), British Liberal Party politician, member of parliament for Carmarthen 1900–1906
- Sir Alfred Davies (Lincoln MP) (1881–1941), MP for Lincoln 1918–1924
- Alfred Davies (Labour politician) (1871–1940), British Labour Party politician, member of parliament for Clitheroe 1918–1922

== Footballers ==
- Alfred Davies (footballer) (1850–1891), Welsh amateur footballer, played for Wrexham
- Alfred Owen Davies (1863–1932), Welsh footballer, played for Crewe Alexandra F.C.
- Alf Davies (footballer) (1889-1952), English footballer, see List of Bury F.C. players (1–24 appearances)

== Other people ==
- Sir Alfred Davies (civil servant) (1861–1949), education official
- Alf Davies (died 1951), Welsh trade unionist
- Alf Davies (swimmer) (1882–1922), English swimmer and water polo player

== See also ==
- Alfred Davis, founder of Rolex
