= Ken Davies =

Ken Davies may refer to:

- Ken Davies (politician) (born 1948), Australian politician
- Ken Davies (artist) (1925–2017), American painter
- Ken Davies (ice hockey) (1922–2004), Canadian hockey player
- Ken Davies (rugby) (1916–1984), Welsh rugby union and rugby league footballer
- Ken Davies (footballer) (1923–2008), English association footballer
- Ken Davies, 1993 winner of the Welsh Sports and Saloon Car Championship

== See also ==
- Kenneth Davis (disambiguation)
