= N. Anne Davies =

American physicist

Nelia Anne Carlton Davies (born 1943) is a retired American physicist who oversaw US-based research on fusion power as head of the US Fusion Energy Sciences program from 1989 to 2006.

== Education and career ==
Davies was born on February 15, 1943, in Springfield, Missouri. She grew up in Arkansas, and graduated from Little Rock Central High School in 1961. She majored in physics at Vassar College, and completed a Ph.D. in 1972 at Yale University, with a dissertation in plasma physics, supervised by Jay L. Hirshfield.

After two years as a postdoctoral researcher at the University of Texas at Austin, she joined the Tokamak Systems Branch of the United States Atomic Energy Commission in 1974, and became branch chief in 1975. Through the Energy Reorganization Act of 1974, this part of the Atomic Energy Commission was split into the newly formed Energy Research and Development Administration in 1975, and then merged into the United States Department of Energy when it was created in 1977.

In 1980, she became a divisional director, of the Toroidal Confinement Systems Division in the Office of Fusion Energy. She was named as deputy director of the US Fusion Energy Sciences program in 1985, and director in 1989. Her tenure saw the program through turbulent times, as the US Congress cut its budget from $345 million to $284 million in 1991, raised it to $350 million again by 1995, and cut it to $239 million the following year. She retired in 2006.

In her retirement, she moved to a farm in Boyds, Maryland, took up horseback fox hunting, and joined the board of directors of Fusion Power Associates, a private foundation for fusion power research.

== Recognition ==
Davies received the Meritorious Service Award of the Department of Energy in 1984, the Meritorious Presidential Rank Award in 1991, and the Secretary of Energy Gold Medal in 1997, and the Meritorious Presidential Executive Rank Award in 1999.

In 2003, she was named as a Fellow of the American Physical Society (APS), after a nomination from the APS Forum on Physics and Society, "for her successful efforts guiding the fusion research community through a difficult transition from a program of energy technology development to a healthy program focused on the critical scientific and technology foundations of fusion energy research".
