= Barbara Davies =

British activist (1955–2002)

(Not to be confused with Barbara Davies, mother of television writer Russell T Davies.)

Barbara Davies (née Eggleston, 30 December 1955 – 1 March 2002), was an English teacher and peace campaigner. She was the national organiser of the Christian Campaign for Nuclear Disarmament (CCND) for a decade.

== Life ==
Davies was born Barbara Eggleston in London in 1955. She was educated at Brighton and Hove School for Girls then studied London School of Economics (LSE). As a student at the LSE, she became involved with the Campaign for Nuclear Disarmament and Young Liberals, the youth wing of the Liberal Party.

After graduating, she taught humanities at a comprehensive school in London for three years, before giving up her job to become a full-time anti-nuclear weapons activist.

Davies became the first paid worker of Christian Campaign for Nuclear Disarmament (CCND) and was its national organiser between 1982 and 1992. In 1989, she founded Dominican Peace Action and after CND worked part time for the Conference of Religious and the Dominican Justice and Peace Commission. In 1996, she organised a pilgrimage from Canterbury to the village of St Radegund (home of the conscientious objector Franz Jägerstätter), Prague, Dresden and Cologne.

Davies died from breast cancer on 1 March 2002, and was survived by her husband Guy Davies and their two sons. She is commemorated on a memorial bench at the St. John Baptist churchyard in Cirencester.

== Legacy ==
Oxford's Quaker House hosts the annual multi-faith "Building Bridges for Peace" event, which is organised by the CCND in Davies' memory. Vigils and memorial lectures are also held in her honour by pacifist groups on the anniversary of her death.

Davies' correspondence in relation the CCND is held in the collect of the LSE. The Thames TV/Channel 4 series A People’s War featured transcripts of pacifist activists, including Davies.
