= Ronnie Davis (drag racer) =

American drag racer (1950–2016)

Ronnie Davis (born March 27, 1950, in Moundville, Alabama, died April 10, 2016), nicknamed "Ronnie the King", was an American drag racer from Suwanee, Georgia, who was a five-time American Hot-Rod Association world champion and Professional Drag Racing champion.

== Career ==
Davis was nicknamed "Ronnie the King" because of his success at the local Atlanta "King of the Hill" drag competition, where he proved to be one of the most accomplished drivers in the Southeast.

=== Death ===
On Sunday, April 10, 2016, Davis had finished his qualifying run for a race at Rockingham Dragway in 4.130 seconds at 178.19 miles per hour, before his car shot to the left where he crashed into the guard-wall and his car barrel-rolled out of control. He suffered major injuries and was taken to Moore County Regional Hospital in Pinehurst, North Carolina, and later to UNC Medical Center in Chapel Hill, North Carolina, where he died that same day.

Also injured in the accident was Ian Tocher, a photographer for Drag Illustrated who was hit by the tumbling car that Ronnie Davis was driving. He was airlifted to UNC Medical Center in Chappell Hill, North Carolina. He suffered an open-book pelvic injury, as well as two badly broken legs. After going through several major surgeries doctors were able to save his legs.
