= Sarah Davies =

Sarah Davies may refer to:

- Sarah Davies (historian), British historian of the Soviet Union
- Sarah Emily Davies (1830–1921), English feminist
- Sarah Davies (weightlifter) (born 1992), British weightlifter
- Sarah Davies, known as Angelle (singer), British singer

== See also ==
- Sara Davies, British businesswoman and entrepreneur
- Sarah Davis (disambiguation)
