= Nicola Davies =

Nicola Davies may refer to:

- Nicola Davies (author) (born 1958), Welsh writer and zoologist
- Nicola Davies (footballer) (born 1985), Welsh goalkeeper
- Nicola Davies (judge) (born 1953), British lawyer
- Nicola Davies (rower), in the 1999 World Rowing Championships
