= Treffor Davies =

English cricketer

Personal information
- Full name: Treffor Elliott Davies
- Born: 13 March 1938; Stourbridge, Worcestershire, England
- Died: 21 December 2013 (aged 75)
- Batting: Right-handed
- Bowling: Leg-break

Career statistics
Competition	FC
Matches	20
Runs scored	481
Batting average	19.24
100s/50s	0/3
Top score	76
Balls bowled	228
Wickets	6
Bowling average	28.16
5 wickets in innings	0
10 wickets in match	0
Best bowling	2/22
Catches/stumpings	8/0
- Source: Cricinfo, 19 October 2007

Treffor Elliott Davies (13 March 1938 – 21 December 2013) was an English cricketer who played 20 first-class matches for Worcestershire between 1955 and 1961.

Davies made his first-class debut for Worcestershire against Oxford University at The University Parks in June 1955; he scored 11 not out in his only innings and took one wicket in each innings (those of John Baker and Stanley Metcalfe). He also played against Cambridge University and Somerset that season and did not appear in first-class cricket again for five years.

Davies returned to the Worcestershire side in 1960. He did not bowl at all that year, although he did score the first of his three half-centuries: 51* against Middlesex near the end of the season. He played much more (11 matches) in 1961, and hit two fifties, the higher of these being the 76 he scored against Glamorgan in late June. That was in fact his penultimate appearance in first-class cricket: his only other game was against Northamptonshire a week later.

Davies died on 21 December 2013, at the age of 75 from lung cancer. He was married to Marina for fifty years and they had two children.
