= Adam Davies =

Adam Davies may refer to:

- Adam Davies (footballer, born 1987), Welsh football full-back
- Adam Davies (footballer, born 1992), Wales international football goalkeeper
- Adam Davies (cricketer) (born 1980), Welsh cricketer
- Adam Davies (author) (born 1971), American author

== See also ==
- Adam Davis (disambiguation)
