= Tim Davies =

Tim Davies may refer to:

- Tim Davies (artist) (born 1960), Welsh artist with the artist group Beca
- Tim Davies (musician), Australian composer, orchestrator and musician
- Tim Davies (pop art artist) (born 1959), British pop art artist
- Tim Davies (racing driver), British Formula 3000 racing driver
- Timothy Davies (runner) (born 1977), Welsh athlete
- Tim Davies (journalist) (born 1983), Australian journalist and television presenter
