= Frederick T. Davies Jr. =

Frederick T. Davies Jr is an American scientist and Professor of Horticulture. He is best known for his work to improve the efficiency of horticulture practice in the United States and as a technique for poverty alleviation globally.

== Education ==
Davies received his B.A. in 1971 and his M.S. in 1975, both from Rutgers University. He received his PhD in 1978 from the University of Florida.

== Career ==
Since 1978, Davies has been a member of the faculty of Texas A&M University, where, since 2010, he has held the position of Regents Professor. Davies is a Fellow of the International Plant Propagators Society and the American Society of Horticultural Science. He is also an Eagle Scout.

Davies was a Fulbright Scholar to Mexico in 1993, to Peru in 1999, and to Indonesia in 2012. In 2013, he served as a Jefferson Science Fellow in the Bureau of Food Security of the United States Agency for International Development.

In 1999, Davies was named a Guggenheim Fellow. In 2016, Davies received the Norman Jay Colman Award from the American Nursery & Landscape Association.
