= Ian Davies =

Ian Davies may refer to:

- Ian Davies (footballer) (born 1957), English former footballer
- Ian Davies (basketball) (1956–2013), Australian basketball player
- Ian Rees Davies (1942–2014), vice-chancellor of the University of Hong Kong
- Ian Puleston-Davies (born 1958), British actor and writer
- Ian Davies (rugby union), (born 1978), Welsh rugby union referee

== See also ==
- Ian Davis (disambiguation)
