= Roger Davies =

Roger Davies may refer to:

- Roger Davies (actor), English actor known for Renford Rejects and The Cloverfield Paradox
- Roger Davies (talent manager) (born 1952), Australian-born manager in the music industry
- Roger Davies (footballer) (born 1950), English footballer, MVP of the North American Soccer League in 1980
- Roger Davies (astrophysicist) (born 1954), English astrophysicist

== See also ==
- Rodger Davies (1921–1974), U.S. ambassador to Cyprus who was assassinated in 1974
- Roger Davis (disambiguation)
