= Eva Davies =

British fencer

Personal information
- Born: 25 December 1924 London, England
- Died: 2 December 2013 (aged 88) Winchester, England

Sport
- Sport: Fencing

Eva Davies (25 December 1924 – 2 December 2013) was a British fencer. She competed in the women's team foil event at the 1968 Summer Olympics.
