= Jane Davies =

British physician (born 1963)

- Born: Jane C. Davies; 9 November 1963 (age 62)
- Education: University of Dundee; Royal Brompton Hospital
- Scientific career
- Fields: Cystic fibrosis Gene therapy
- Workplaces: Imperial College London
- Website: imperial.ac.uk/people/j.c.davies

Jane Carolyn Davies OBE (born 9 November 1963) is a British physician who is Professor of Paediatric Respirology at Imperial College School of Medicine. She is an Honorary Consultant at the Royal Brompton and Harefield NHS Foundation Trust.

== Early life and education ==
Davies studied medicine at the University of Dundee. She graduated in 1987, and began paediatric training in London. She began to work at the Royal Brompton Hospital on cystic fibrosis. She earned her MD on host-pathogen interactions under the supervision of Andrew Bush and Eric Alton. She looked at the pathogensis of Pseudomonas aeruginosa. She worked at Great Ormond Street Hospital.

== Career and research ==
Davies joined the National Heart and Lung Institute in 1999, where she has specialised in cystic fibrosis. Davies has been involved with the UK CF Gene Therapy Consortium since it was established in 2002. Davies worked on the development of Cystic fibrosis transmembrane conductance regulator (CFTR) gene therapy. She led the first trials of CFTR modulators in young children. She conducts bronchoscopic assays and electrophysiological measurements. She was made a Reader in 2009 and a Professor in 2013. Davies investigates cystic fibrosis. She was involved with a major UK trial of gene therapy for cystic fibrosis.

Davies leads the Strategic Research Centre for Pseudomonas Infection in Cystic Fibrosis at Imperial College London, one of few centres supported by the Cystic Fibrosis Trust. The centre looks to identify new ways to detect pseudomonas aeruginosa. Davies is part of the European CF Society Clinical Trials Network. She was involved in the design of the clinical trial, as well as validation of outcome measures. She works on the use of nasal potential difference to diagnose atypical cystic fibrosis. She was awarded a £2.8 million research grant from the Wellcome Trust to optimise the lentiviral vector for gene therapy.

In 2020 she won the Senior Investigator award from the National Institute for Health Research (NIHR).

Davies was elected a Fellow of the Academy of Medical Sciences in 2024.

=== Publications ===
Davies publications include:

- Davies, Jane (2006). "Current and Novel Antimicrobial Approaches". In Bush, A. (ed.). Cystic Fibrosis in the 21st Century. London: S. Karger. ISBN 9783318012408. OCLC 728412484.
- Greisenbach, U.; Alton, E.W.F.W.; Davies, J.C. (2006). "CF Modifier Genes". In Bush, Andrew (ed.). Cystic Fibrosis in the 21st Century. Basel: Karger. ISBN 1423796802. OCLC 71126311.
- 2011 An Atlas of Investigation and Management. Paediatric Respiratory Disease: Vol 1 Airways & Infection
- 2011 An Atlas of Investigation and Management. Paediatric Respiratory Disease: Vol 2 Parenchymal Disease
- Alton, Eric W; Davies, Jane C; Griesenbach, Uta (2013). Current & Emerging Pharmaceutical Treatments for Cystic Fibrosis Lung Disease. pp. 2–4. doi:10.2217/ebo.13.170. ISBN 978-1-78084-096-3.
