= Sally Davies =

Sally Davies may refer to:

- Sally Davies (artist) (born 1956), Canadian painter and photographer, based in New York City
- Sally Davies (doctor) (born 1949), British doctor and Chief Medical Officer for England
