= Arthur Davis (English cricketer) =

English cricketer

Arthur Edward Davis (4 August 1882 – 4 November 1916) was an English cricketer active from 1901 to 1908 who played for Leicestershire. He was born in Leicester and died near Albert, France during the First World War. He appeared in 21 first-class matches as a righthanded batsman who kept wicket and scored 334 runs with a highest score of 55 and completed 37 catches with ten stumpings.
