= Clifford Davis =

Clifford Davis may refer to:

- L. Clifford Davis (1924–2025), American attorney
- Clifford Davis (politician) (1897–1970), Democratic U.S. Representative from Tennessee
- Clifford Davis (music manager), British musician and music manager
- Clifford Davis (athlete) (1900–1974), South African track and field athlete
