= Rhys Davies =

Rhys Davies may refer to:

- Rhys Davies (writer) (1901–1978), Welsh novelist and short story writer
- Rhys Davies (engineer) (died 1838), American engineer in Richmond, Virginia associated with the Tredegar Iron Works
- Rhys Davies (politician) (1877–1954), British Labour Member of Parliament for Westhoughton from 1921 to 1951
- Rhys Davies (golfer) (born 1985), Welsh golfer
- Rhys Davies (canoeist) (born 1990), British slalom canoeist
- Rhys Davies (rugby union, born February 1998), Welsh rugby union player
- Rhys Davies (rugby union, born November 1998), Welsh rugby union player
- Rhys Davies (athlete), Welsh runner

== See also ==
- Arthur Rhys-Davids (1897–1917), Air Ace
- Rees Davies (1938–2005), Welsh historian
- John Rhys-Davies (born 1944), Welsh actor
- John Rhys Davies (priest) (1890–1953), Welsh priest
