= Ann Davis (journalist) =

American journalist

Ann Davis is an American journalist who was a special writer for The Wall Street Journal. She covered the global energy industry and markets, energy infrastructure, and natural resources investing. Prior to moving to Houston in early 2006, she covered the "Wall Street" securities industry beat in New York for several years.

In early 2010, she founded Reservoir Research Partners, an independent research firm in Houston that provides intelligence to institutional investors and other clients. She publishes occasional reports for investors, including "Frac Attack: Risks, Hype, and Financial Reality of Hydraulic Fracturing in the Shale Plays", co-published July 8, 2010 with energy investment bank Tudor Pickering Holt & Co.

== Biography ==
Born in Asheville, N.C., Davis received a bachelor's degree from Princeton University, Summa Cum Laude and Phi Beta Kappa, and received a master's degree, with honors, in print journalism from the Columbia University Graduate School of Journalism. Davis resides in Houston with her husband, Richard Vaughan.

Davis joined the Journal in 1996 as a staff reporter in its legal affairs group and covered the tobacco industry legal wars and white-collar crime. From 2000 to 2001, she held an investigative/special projects post examining financial and health-care companies' pursuit of the elder-consumer market, revealing abuses in the long-term care insurance field and fraud in the use of Medicaid annuities. After 9/11, she took on a terrorism and civil liberties beat, describing flaws in FBI and federal aviation terrorist watch lists. In 2003, she was named a senior special writer and began the "Wall Street" beat. For much of 2005, she covered the ongoing story of executive-suite upheaval at Morgan Stanley.

From 2006 to early 2010, she covered global commodity markets, the energy industry, and natural-resources investing.

Prior to joining the Journal, Davis was a staff reporter for The Miami Herald from 1992 to 1994, where she covered metro news, education and local business and real-estate development. From 1994 to 1996, she was a staff writer for The National Law Journal, where she covered the legal profession and professional ethics.

== Awards ==
Davis is the recipient of a 2007 Gerald Loeb Award in Deadline Writing for her page-one account of how a 32-year-old trader's risky natural-gas bets triggered more than $6 billion in losses at high-flying hedge fund Amaranth Advisors, the day after its troubles first hit the markets.

She won a 2005 "Business Journalist of the Year Award" from the World Leadership Forum in London, in the mergers category, for her story about how a UBS investment banker carved out a rich niche by raising money for health-care companies even as investors fared poorly. She contributed two parts to the paper's "Open Secrets" series, exposing conflicts of interest in the securities industry, that won the 2005 Business Award from the New York Press Club.

In 1997, Davis was the recipient of the American Society of Business Publication Editors Award "1st Place, News Series, Under 100,000 Circulation" for her three-part series in 1996 in The National Law Journal on the ease with which some disbarred lawyers gain readmission to practice law.

In 1996, she received a National Headliner Award from the Press Club of Atlantic City in the "Consistently Outstanding Feature Writing by an Individual on a Variety of Subjects" category for articles in 1995 in The National Law Journal.
