= Stephen Davies =

Stephen, Steven or Steve Davies may refer to:

== Politics ==
- Steve Davies (politician) (born 1965), Australian Liberal National politician
- S. O. Davies (Stephen Owen Davies, died 1972), Welsh politician

== Sports ==
- Stephen Davies (field hockey) (born 1969), Australian field hockey player
- Steve Davies (footballer, born 1960), English footballer
- Steve Davies (footballer, born 1987), English footballer
- Steve Davies (rugby league) (born 1959), rugby league footballer who played in the 1970s and 1980s
- Steven Davies (Australian footballer), Australian rules footballer for the West Coast Eagles
- Steven Davies (born 1986), English cricketer
- Stephen Davies (speedway rider) (born 1965), Australian speedway rider

== Others ==
- Stephen Davies (bishop) (1883–1961), Australian Anglican bishop
- Stephen Davies (ornithologist) (1935–2020), Australian ornithologist
- Stephen G. Davies (born 1950), British chemist
- Stephen Davies (philosopher) (born 1950), New Zealand philosopher
- Stephen Davies (writer) (born 1976), British children's writer

== See also ==
- Steve Davis (disambiguation)
