= Donald Davies (disambiguation) =

Donald Davies (1924–2000) was a Welsh computer scientist.

Donald Davies may also refer to:

- Don Davies (born 1963), Canadian politician
- Donald Davies (bishop) (1920–2011), Episcopal bishop
- Donnie Davies, 2007 fictional American anti-homosexual campaigner

== See also ==
- Donald Davis (disambiguation)
