= Alex Davies =

Alex Davies may refer to:

- Alex Davies (snooker player) (born 1987), English snooker player
- Alex Davies (cricketer) (born 1994), English cricketer
- Alex Davies (footballer) (born 2002), Australian rules footballer
- Alex Davies (musician), musician with the band Elliot Minor
- Alex Davies (rugby union) (born 1986), English rugby union player
- Alex Davies (neo-Nazi) (born 1994 or 1995), Welsh convicted neo-Nazi

== See also ==
- Alex Davies-Jones (born 1989), Welsh politician
