= Llewelyn Davies (aviator) =

British WWI flying ace

Llewelyn Crichton Davies
- Born: 9 January 1889; Cardiff, Wales
- Died: 16 March 1918 (aged 29); Oxford, England
- Burial place: Penton Mewsey, Hampshire, England
- Military career
- Allegiance: United Kingdom
- Branch: British Army
- Service years: 1914–1918
- Rank: Lieutenant
- Units: 5th Cameronians (Scottish Rifles); No. 22 Squadron RFC; No. 105 Squadron RFC
- Conflicts: World War I
- Awards: Military Cross

Lieutenant Llewelyn Crichton Davies MC (9 January 1889 – 16 March 1918) was a Welsh World War I flying ace credited with five aerial victories.

== Biography ==
Llewellyn Crichton (or Crighton) Davies was born in Cardiff, the son of William Henry Davies, the editor of the Cardiff Figaro, and Hanna Crighton, from Forfar. He was educated at Cardiff and at Halifax, and became a chartered accountant.

On the outbreak of World War I, he was living in Pollokshields, Glasgow, and enlisted as a private in the 5th Battalion, Cameronians (Scottish Rifles) on 4 August 1914. On 7 March 1915 he was commissioned as a second lieutenant. Davies saw action with his regiment on the Western Front during the Battle of the Somme, and on 28 August 1916 he was awarded the Military Cross. His citation read:

Second Lieutenant Llewellyn Crighton Davies, Scottish Rifles.
For conspicuous gallantry in action. He handled his trench-mortars with great skill, and knocked out an enemy machine-gun that was holding up the advance. He also took charge of various parties that had lost their officers, and brought in single-handed a wounded man under heavy fire.

In February 1917 he was seconded to the Royal Flying Corps as a flying officer (observer), and served with No. 22 Squadron as an observer/gunner in the FE.2b reconnaissance aircraft. While flying with Captain Carleton Main Clement on morning formation patrol, he was credited with two Albatros D.III fighters destroyed on 6 and 8 April 1917, although they were shared with several others, including Gerald Gordon Bell. On 5 June, Davies and Clement destroyed an Albatros D.V and drove a second one down out of control. Davies was promoted to lieutenant on 1 July. On 29 July, having upgraded to a Bristol F.2 Fighter, Davies and Clement shot down another German aircraft, thought to be that of Kurt Schneider, Staffelführer of Jasta 5. Schneider later died of wounds received in this action.

In November 1917, Davies was reassigned to No. 105 Squadron. He was appointed a flying officer on 27 February 1918, but on 13 March, while based at the 54th Training Depot Station, he was fatally injured after crashing his Airco DH.4 (serial number B5495), and died three days later at the Somerville Section of the 3rd Southern General Hospital in Oxford.

Davies is buried at Holy Trinity Church, Penton Mewsey, Hampshire, England.
