= Edwin Davies (publisher) =

Welsh publisher and editor

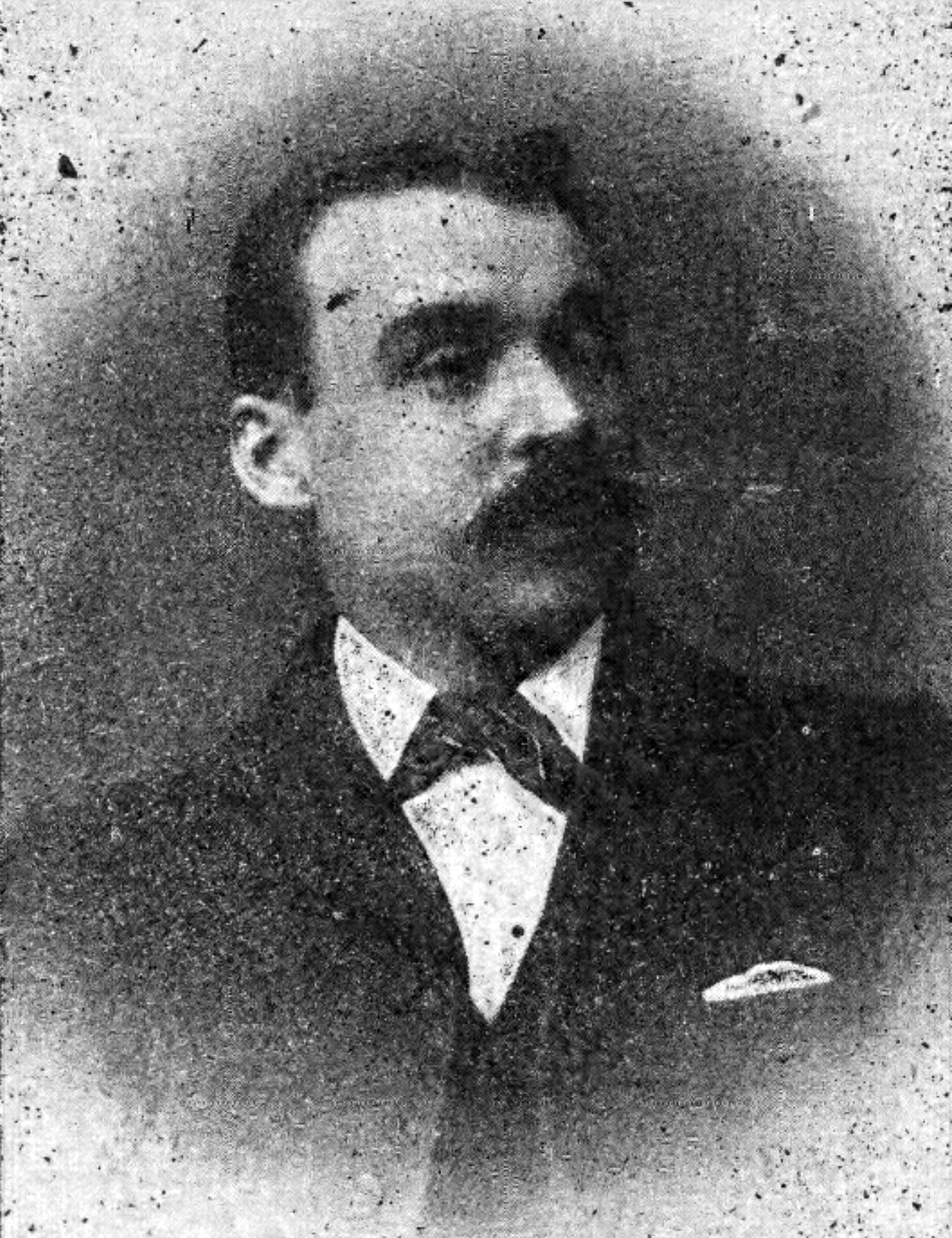
Edwin Davies

Edwin Davies (March 1859 – February 1919) was a Welsh publisher and editor. Born in Old Parr's Cottage, Welshpool, in the historic county of Montgomeryshire in Mid Wales, his family later moved south to Brecon, where he grew up. On completing his elementary education, he began a seven-year apprenticeship to a printing and publishing business. He was later employed as the business foreman, before acquiring the business and becoming its manager-editor, editing and publishing the newspaper, Brecon and Radnor County Times, for the next twelve years. During this time he campaigned for the Disestablishment of the Church in Wales, which was achieved in 1914, and endorsed Liberal views.

His publications include The Birds of Breconshire by E. C. Phillips (1899), A General History of the County of Radnor (from the manuscript notes of Jonathan Williams and other sources) (1905), and reissues of, 'The History and Antiquities of the County of Cardigan' by Sir Samuel Rush Meyrick (1907), and A Historical Tour through Pembrokeshire by Richard Fenton (1903).

He died at Dinas Lodge, Brecon in 1919, and was buried in Brecon cemetery.
