= David (disambiguation) =

David was the second king of the United Kingdom of Israel and a figure in the scriptures of Abrahamic religions.

David may also refer to:

== Arts, entertainment, and media ==
=== Film and television ===
- David (1951 film)
- David (1979 film), a West German film set in Nazi Germany
- David (1988 film), an American drama based on the story of David Rothenberg
- David (1997 film)
- David (2013 Hindi film), an Indian multilingual film
- David (2013 Tamil film), an Indian multilingual film
- David (2020 film), an American short film
- David (2025 film), a Biblical musical drama animated film
- David (TV series), a Flemish telenovela

=== Music ===
- David (David Hasselhoff album) (1991)
- David (David Meece album) (1976)
- David (David Ruffin album) (2004)
- David, a 1955 opera by Darius Milhaud
- The David (band), a 1960s/70s American garage rock band
- "David", a song by GusGus from the 2002 album Attention
- "David", a song by Animals as Leaders from the 2011 album Weightless
- "David", a song by Lorde from the 2025 album Virgin

=== Visual art ===
- David (Bernini), a sculpture by Gian Lorenzo Bernini
- David (Donatello, marble), a 1408–09 marble statue by Donatello
- David (Donatello, bronze), a 1440s bronze statue by Donatello
- David (Michelangelo), a sculpture by Michelangelo
  - David (inspired by Michelangelo), a sculpture by Turkish conceptual artist Serkan Özkaya
  - Replicas of Michelangelo's David
- David (Verrocchio), a sculpture by Andrea del Verrocchio

== People ==
- David (name), a common given name
- David (surname)
- Dávid family, a Hungarian noble family, based in present-day Slovakia
- Jacques-Louis David (1748–1825), French painter often known only as David
- List of people with given name David
- David (footballer, born 1977)
- David (footballer, born 1982)
- David (footballer, born March 1986)
- David (footballer, born July 1986)
- David (footballer, born 1990)
- David (footballer, born June 1995)
- David (footballer, born October 1995)
- David (footballer, born 1999)
- David (footballer, born 2001)

== Places ==
- David, Chiriquí, Panama, a city
- David, a village in Văleni Commune, Neamț County, Romania
- David, Iowa, US, an unincorporated community
- David, Kentucky, US, an unincorporated community
- Camp David, the US presidential retreat in Maryland
- David City, Nebraska, US, a city

== Technology ==
- DAVID, a bioinformatics tool for high-throughput analysis of gene product functions
- DAVID (Digital Audio Video Interactive Decoder), a platform for digital TV made by Microware
- David Laserscanner, a software package and wiki for 3D laser scanning

== Other uses ==
- David (car), a Spanish car-manufacturing company
- CSS David, a Confederate torpedo boat during the American Civil War
- David Sunflower Seeds, a ConAgra Foods brand
- List of storms named David, tropical and extratropical cyclones named David
- David's Bridal, an American formalwear chain
- David's Supermarkets, a former supermarket chain in Texas

== See also ==
- Dave (disambiguation)
- Daveed (disambiguation)
- Davide (disambiguation)
- David Jay (disambiguation)
- Davíð
- King David (disambiguation)
- Saint David (disambiguation)
- Dawood (disambiguation), King David in Islam
- Dawid, a list of people with the given name or surname
- Devid (disambiguation), a list of people with the given name
- D4vd, American singer
