= Dave =

Dave may refer to:

== Arts and entertainment ==
- Dave (film), a 1993 film starring Kevin Kline and Sigourney Weaver
- Dave (musical), a 2018 stage musical adaptation of the 1993 film
- Dave (TV series), a 2020 American comedy series
- "Dave" (Lost), an episode of Lost
- Dave, a digital television channel in the United Kingdom and Ireland now rebranded as U&Dave
- Dave's Television Channel 8, a Guyanese television channel

== People ==
- Dave (given name), a list of people and fictional characters
- Dave (surname), a common Gujarati surname
- Dave (American rapper), aka David Jolicoeur (1967–2023), of the hip hop group De La Soul
- Dave (artist) (born 1969), Swiss artist
- Dave (rapper) (born 1998), English rapper from London
- Dave (singer) (born 1944), Dutch-born French singer

== Software ==
- Dave (company), a digital banking service
- DAvE (Infineon), a C-language software development tool
- Thursby DAVE, a Windows file and printer sharing for Macs

== Other uses ==
- Dave (Belgium), a town in Belgium
- Damping and Vibrations Experiment, a 1U CubeSat
- "Dave", a 1984 song by the Boomtown Rats from In the Long Grass
- "Dave", a 2011 song by Missing Andy

== See also ==
- Dangerous Dave, a 1988 platform game for MS-DOS and Apple II
- Dave FM (disambiguation)
- Davey (disambiguation)
- David (disambiguation)
- Davy (disambiguation)
