= Dawid =

Dawid is a Hebrew masculine given name, related to David, and more rarely a surname. People with the name include:

== Given name ==
- Dawid Abrahamowicz (1839–1926), Polish politician
- Dawid Abramowicz (born 1991), Polish footballer
- Dawid Moryc Apfelbaum, fictitious World War II Polish Army officer and a commander of the Jewish Military Union
- Dawid Bezuidenhout (1935–1998), teacher and politician in South West Africa
- Dawid Celt (born 1985), Polish tennis player and coach
- Dawid Daniuszewski (1885–1944), Polish chess master
- Dawid Dryja (born 1992), Polish volleyball player
- Dawid Dynarek (born 1989), Polish footballer
- Dawid Dzięgielewski (born 1993), Polish footballer
- Dawid Eigub, Namibian politician
- Dawid Głowacki (born 1987), Polish cyclist
- Dawid Jackiewicz (born 1973), Polish politician and former Minister of State Treasury
- Dawid Janczyk (born 1987), Polish footballer
- Dawid Janowski (1868–1927), Polish-born French chess player
- Dawid Jarka (born 1987), Polish footballer
- Dawid Kamiński (born 1995), Polish footballer
- Dawid Kasperski (born 1990), Polish Muay Thai kickboxer
- Dawid Kellerman, 21st century South African rugby union player
- Dawid Kielak, Polish mathematician
- Dawid Kocyła (born 2002), Polish footballer
- Dawid Kort (born 1995), Polish footballer
- Dawid Kostecki (1981–2019), Polish boxer
- Dawid Kownacki (born 1997), Polish footballer
- Dawid Kręt (born 1988), Polish football goalkeeper
- Dawid Kruiper (1935–2012), traditional healer and leader of the ǂKhomani San
- Dawid Krupa (born 1980), Polish former cyclist
- Dawid Kubacki (born 1990), Polish ski jumper, twice world champion
- Dawid Kucharski (born 1984), Polish footballer
- Dawid Kudła (born 1992), Polish football goalkeeper
- Dawid Kupczyk (born 1977), Polish bobsledder
- Dawid Kurminowski (born 1999), Polish footballer
- Dawid Kwiatkowski (born 1996), Polish singer-songwriter
- Dawid Kwiek (born 1988), Polish footballer
- Dawid Lande (1868–1928), Polish architect
- Dawid Malan (born 1987), English cricketer
- Dawid Nowak (born 1984), Polish footballer
- Dawid Ogrodnik (born 1986), Polish actor
- Dawid Olejniczak (born 1983), Polish tennis player
- Dawid Pietrzkiewicz (born 1988), Polish footballer
- Dawid Pietrzyński (born 1991), Polish ice dancer
- Dawid Plizga (born 1985), Polish footballer
- Dawid Podsiadło (born 1993), Polish singer-songwriter
- Dawid Przepiórka (1880–1940), Polish chess player
- Dawid Przysiek (born 1987), Polish handball player
- Dawid Rogalski (born 1996), Polish footballer
- Dawid Ryndak (born 1989), Polish footballer
- Dawid Sarkisow (born 1982), Turkmen footballer
- Dawid Sołdecki (born 1987), Polish footballer
- Dawid Szot (born 2001), Polish footballer
- Dawid Szufryn (born 1986), Polish football player
- Dawid Szymonowicz (born 1995), Polish footballer
- Dawid Tkacz (born 2005), Polish footballer
- Dawid Tomala (born 1989), Polish race walker
- Dawid Wdowiński (1895–1970), Polish-born American psychiatrist and doctor of neurology and political leader of a World War II Jewish resistance organization
- Dawid Woliński (born 1977), Polish fashion designer
- Dawid Żebrowski (born 1997), Polish hurdler

== Surname ==
- Anna Kazejak-Dawid (born 1979), Polish director and screenwriter
- Christian Dawid (born 1966), German Clarinetist, Klezmer Musician, educator, and composer
- Jan Władysław Dawid (1859–1914), Polish teacher, psychologist, and pioneer of educational psychology and experimental pedagogy
- Philip Dawid (born 1946), British statistician
