= KRET =

KRET may refer to:

- KRET-CD, a low-power television station (channel 31, virtual channel 45) licensed to Cathedral City, California, United States
- KRET-TV, a defunct television station (channel 23) in Richardson, Texas, United States
- Concern Radio-Electronic Technologies, a Russian defense company
- Dawid Kręt (born 1988), Polish football goalkeeper
- Léo Kret, Brazilian politician, dancer, actress, and singer
