= Wépion strawberry =

Strawberry grown near Wépion, Belgium

The Wépion strawberry is a horticultural product which arises from strawberry crops planted near Wépion, a village in the municipality of Namur, Wallonia, Belgium. The label of origin "Wépion strawberry" is not geographically protected and covers several different strawberry varieties.

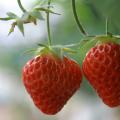

== History ==
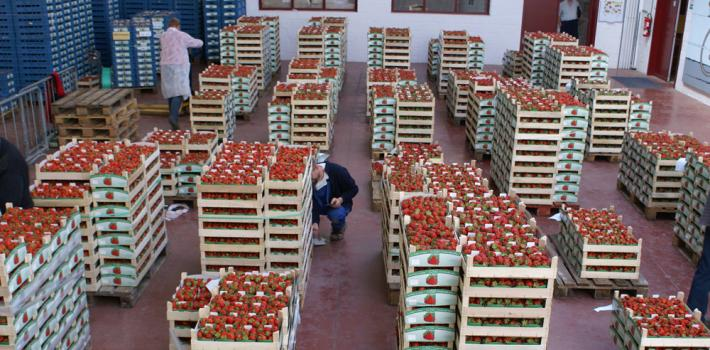
Auction of Wépion (French: Criée de Wépion): the market place

Between the two World Wars, the paid leave entitlement and the emergence of popular tourism in the production area contributed to the reputation of this strawberry. Many families from the villages of Bois-de-Villers, Dave, Maillen, Malonne and Wépion and the surroundings have for decades cultivated small areas (a few ares), selling the produce on the public squares of different villages.

The trade expansion happened in the 1960s with the consolidation of the different local marketplaces into a cooperative that was located at the border between Bois-de-Villers and Wépion. The building very quickly came to be called "Auction of Wépion" (French: Criée de Wépion) and then included several hundred of strawberry producers.

The urbanization of the villages and the increase of legal restrictions in the 1970s prompted a drastic and important reduction of the number of producers, only about ten of whom remained in the early 1980s. Their production and marketing methods became more professional and the production area spread over twenty kilometres around the Criée de Wépion. The professional strawberry producers were born.

In the early 2000s, the cooperative became a real producers organization (EEC Regulation 2200/96), opened for all the producers who feel concerned with the spread of strawberry production.

== General points ==
The Wépion strawberry is grown according to very strict specifications and producers are helped by some agronomic technicians who are members of an independent structure, "the Walloon Strawberry Producers Organization" ("le Groupement des Fraisiéristes Wallons" in French).

The first strawberries of May are harvested thanks to greenhouses or plastic tunnels which can be heated or not. June is meant for unforced and field production. From July to October, harvests from the seedlings bedded out from April to July extend the growing season.

The care that strawberry plants need is registered so that the strawberry producer can ensure the traceability of the marketed strawberry at any time. Checks are carried out every day in order to assure the required quality and to prevent any problems.

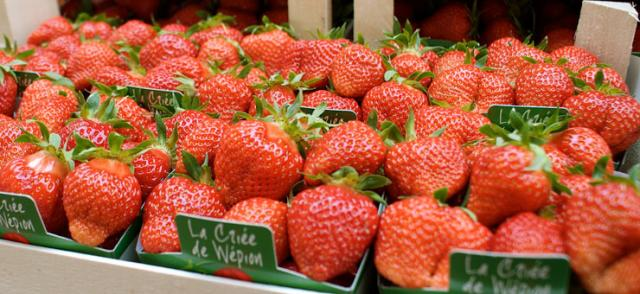
Strawberries arranged in cardboard punnets

Strawberries are harvested fully ripe in the morning before the intense heat of the afternoon and they are then carefully arranged in punnets or in cartons.

Besides their fully ripe crop, the particularity of the Criée de Wépion's strawberries is the fact that they are presented by being arranged in the same vein on the top of the punnet. By evening of their crop day, the strawberries are sold through the auction to both the wholesalers or retail outlets and supermarkets, that can then offer them to sell from the following day.

The Criée de Wépion is an approved cooperative and it collaborates with "the Strawberry Producers Organization" ("le Groupement des Fraisiéristes" in French) -GFW- which is the pilot centre of the strawberry sector in Wallonia.

== Auction ==
Every evening at 7.30 during the harvest season, the strawberry growers offer their produce at an auction which is open to the merchants and traders.

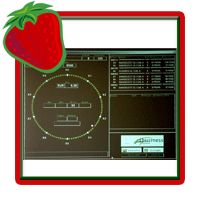
Clock for the auction sale

The buyers, gathered in one place, bid Dutch auction style on a price which is given on a dial ("the clock"), the hours of which are replaced with a price and the hand of which can be stopped by the buyers present.
