= 2023–24 Isthmian League =

The 2023–24 season was the 109th season of the Isthmian League, which is an English football competition featuring semi-professional and amateur clubs from London, East and South East England. The league operates four divisions, the Premier Division at Step 3 (the 7th tier) and three divisions, North, South Central and South East at Step 4 of the National League System (the 8th tier). This was the sixth season since the former South Division was subdivided into the South Central and South East divisions. The league is also known as the Pitching In League under a sponsorship deal with Entain, formerly GVC Holdings.

The allocations for Step 4 this season were announced by The Football Association (FA) on 15 May 2023. There were to be 82 teams in the Isthmian League, 22 in the Step 3 division and 20 in each of the Step 4 divisions. However, Marlow successfully appealed against their transfer to the Southern League and remained in the South Central Division, which therefore comprised 21 teams instead of 20.

== Premier Division ==
Isthmian League Premier Division
- Season: 2023–24
- Champions: Hornchurch
- Promoted: Hornchurch; Enfield Town
- Relegated: Margate; Haringey Borough; Kingstonian; Concord Rangers

The Premier Division comprised sixteen teams from the previous season, as well as six clubs who newly joined the division.

=== Team changes ===
To the Premier Division

Promoted from the North Division

- Hashtag United

Promoted from the South East Division

- Chatham Town
- Whitehawk

Relegated from the National League South

- Cheshunt
- Concord Rangers
- Dulwich Hamlet

From the Premier Division

Promoted to the National League North

- Bishop's Stortford

Promoted to the National League South

- Aveley

Relegated to the North Division

- Bowers & Pitsea
- Brightlingsea Regent

Relegated to the South Central Division

- Corinthian-Casuals

Relegated to the South East Division

- Herne Bay

=== Premier Division table ===
Pos	Team	Pld	W	D	L	GF	GA	GD	Pts	Promotion, qualification or relegation
1	Hornchurch (C, P)	42	31	7	4	95	34	+61	100	Promotion to the National League South
2	Chatham Town	42	24	7	11	87	61	+26	79	Qualification for the play-offs
3	Enfield Town (O, P)	42	22	11	9	81	54	+27	77	Qualification for the play-offs
4	Wingate & Finchley	42	23	7	12	78	62	+16	76	Qualification for the play-offs
5	Horsham	42	23	7	12	64	50	+14	76	Qualification for the play-offs
6	Billericay Town	42	23	4	15	78	52	+26	73	
7	Hastings United	42	19	10	13	71	54	+17	67	
8	Lewes	42	20	7	15	68	70	−2	67	
9	Whitehawk	42	17	14	11	63	54	+9	65	
10	Bognor Regis Town	42	16	14	12	78	63	+15	62	
11	Carshalton Athletic	42	17	11	14	73	59	+14	62	
12	Dulwich Hamlet	42	17	11	14	77	72	+5	62	
13	Hashtag United	42	15	14	13	82	75	+7	59	
14	Canvey Island	42	16	6	20	62	74	−12	54	
15	Potters Bar Town	42	14	9	19	65	70	−5	51	
16	Folkestone Invicta	42	13	11	18	60	71	−11	50	
17	Cray Wanderers	42	13	11	18	54	66	−12	50	
18	Cheshunt	42	12	7	23	58	72	−14	43	
19	Margate (R)	42	10	9	23	50	80	−30	39	Relegation to South East Division
20	Haringey Borough (R)	42	6	9	27	32	88	−56	27	Relegation to North Division
21	Concord Rangers (R)	42	6	8	28	34	82	−48	26	Relegation to North Division
22	Kingstonian (R)	42	5	6	31	55	102	−47	21	Relegated to South Central Division

Source: Isthmian League
Rules for classification: 1) points; 2) goal difference; 3) number of goals scored; 4) number of matches won; 5) head-to-head results
(C) Champions; (O) Play-off winners; (P) Promoted; (R) Relegated

=== Play-offs ===
Semi-finals
2	Chatham Town	1 (4)
5	Horsham	1 (3)
3	Enfield Town	1
4	Wingate & Finchley	0

Final
2	Chatham Town	0
3	Enfield Town	3

==== Semi-finals ====
1 May	Chatham Town	1–1 (a.e.t.) (4–3 p)	Horsham	Chatham
19:45	Scarlett (yellow card) 15'; Robins (yellow card) 27'; Evans (yellow card) 35'; Da Costa (yellow card) 59'; Dunne (yellow card) 68'; Isiaka 106'; Dickson (yellow card) 109'; Butler (yellow card) 116'	Report	Philpot (yellow card) 46'; Brivio (yellow card) 104'; Hammond (yellow card) 7' (goal) 112'; Hester-Cook (yellow card) 118'	Stadium: The Bauvil Stadium; Attendance: 3,000; Referee: Jake Hillier
	Penalties
	Beeney (penalty missed); Dunne (penalty scored); Dickson (penalty scored); Evans (penalty scored); Yila (penalty scored)		(penalty scored) Hammond; (penalty missed) Mazzone; (penalty scored) Barker; (penalty scored) Carey; (penalty missed) Brivio

1 May	Enfield Town	1–0	Wingate & Finchley	Enfield
19:45	McKenzie 67'	Report		Stadium: Queen Elizabeth II Stadium; Attendance: 2,225

==== Final ====
6 May	Chatham Town	0–3	Enfield Town	Chatham
15:00		Report	Knight 48'; Wyllie 71'; Taaffe 90+3'	Stadium: The Bauvil Stadium; Attendance: 3,000; Referee: Jake Willmore

=== Results table ===
Home \ Away	BIL	BOG	CAN	CAR	CHA	CHE	CON	CRA	DUL	ENF	FOL	HAB	HSH	HAS	HOR	HRM	KIN	LEW	MAR	POT	WHK	W&F
Billericay Town		2–1	0–1	2–0	2–0	2–1	2–0	6–0	3–0	1–1	1–2	1–2	2–4	2–0	1–1	1–2	1–0	5–0	5–3	2–1	1–3	1–2
Bognor Regis Town	1–0		1–1	3–3	2–1	1–1	2–0	2–1	0–2	2–4	4–0	3–0	0–0	0–1	1–2	2–0	2–0	3–3	2–2	2–2	2–2	2–2
Canvey Island	3–0	1–3		0–0	3–2	1–1	1–0	2–1	0–2	0–3	2–1	3–2	2–2	0–0	4–1	1–2	3–2	0–2	4–1	1–4	1–2	0–2
Carshalton Athletic	1–2	3–3	0–3		2–0	1–4	2–0	1–2	3–0	1–1	3–1	1–0	0–1	2–1	2–2	1–2	4–1	1–1	3–0	5–0	2–1	2–3
Chatham Town	6–3	1–0	5–1	2–2		3–2	2–1	1–5	2–1	3–1	2–0	2–1	2–3	1–2	2–0	1–3	4–1	3–0	2–1	2–0	1–0	2–1
Cheshunt	0–1	3–1	1–3	1–0	1–2		2–1	0–1	2–1	1–2	3–2	0–2	1–1	2–3	0–6	1–0	5–4	4–0	0–1	2–4	2–0	0–1
Concord Rangers	2–1	0–4	1–3	1–2	1–3	0–3		0–3	1–2	0–1	2–1	0–0	1–4	3–3	0–3	1–1	0–0	4–1	1–2	0–2	1–1	0–2
Cray Wanderers	0–1	1–5	2–1	1–0	2–2	2–1	1–1		1–1	2–0	0–1	3–3	1–3	0–0	1–4	1–3	1–0	1–1	0–0	1–2	2–2	1–0
Dulwich Hamlet	1–2	1–1	4–1	2–1	2–5	4–2	2–0	2–6		0–4	3–1	3–1	2–1	1–2	2–3	1–1	3–2	2–0	2–2	2–2	0–0	3–0
Enfield Town	1–2	2–2	3–0	0–3	2–2	3–0	3–0	2–0	3–2		0–2	1–0	6–3	3–1	1–2	2–1	0–0	1–0	2–0	3–1	4–4	2–2
Folkestone Invicta	1–0	0–1	1–0	3–3	2–3	2–1	1–1	2–2	3–3	1–2		1–1	1–3	0–5	0–2	3–1	3–2	3–1	2–0	0–0	1–1	1–1
Haringey Borough	0–6	0–1	2–1	0–6	0–3	1–0	0–1	0–4	1–1	1–1	0–0		1–4	0–5	1–2	0–2	2–2	0–4	1–0	0–3	1–1	1–2
Hashtag United	2–1	4–5	3–1	2–2	1–1	3–3	2–3	1–0	2–2	3–3	0–0	5–0		1–2	0–3	1–2	2–2	2–3	4–2	2–3	1–1	2–0
Hastings United	1–1	1–1	0–2	4–0	1–1	1–1	3–0	3–0	2–2	0–3	2–1	2–1	2–0		1–0	0–2	3–2	1–3	4–0	0–1	0–1	2–3
Hornchurch	4–1	4–1	2–0	1–1	2–1	1–0	1–0	2–0	2–1	2–0	4–2	3–0	3–0	4–1		1–1	2–1	1–1	4–1	3–0	0–0	1–2
Horsham	0–0	5–4	2–1	1–2	2–2	1–0	2–0	2–0	3–2	1–1	2–1	1–0	0–2	2–1	1–2		3–1	1–3	1–0	2–0	0–1	1–1
Kingstonian	1–3	3–2	2–1	2–3	1–3	1–1	1–2	3–0	2–1	2–3	3–0	0–3	3–5	1–3	0–3	1–2		1–3	1–3	0–2	1–4	1–2
Lewes	0–3	1–0	2–2	1–3	0–3	2–1	2–1	1–0	0–2	4–0	1–3	4–1	2–1	3–1	2–2	2–1	2–1		4–2	3–0	1–1	1–2
Margate	1–3	0–2	3–2	0–1	2–0	1–2	1–1	1–1	1–4	1–1	0–2	1–1	1–1	1–2	0–1	1–3	2–2	2–0		2–1	2–1	2–1
Potters Bar Town	1–3	1–1	1–2	1–1	0–0	1–1	4–3	1–1	1–2	0–2	3–3	2–1	5–0	1–3	0–1	0–1	6–1	1–2	2–3		1–0	3–2
Whitehawk	0–1	3–2	0–2	1–0	1–2	2–0	4–0	2–0	1–1	1–0	3–2	2–1	1–1	0–0	0–4	3–1	3–0	1–2	3–2	2–1		3–3
Wingate & Finchley	2–1	0–1	6–2	3–0	4–2	3–2	2–0	1–3	2–3	1–4	0–4	1–0	0–0	2–2	1–4	2–0	2–1	3–0	1–0	3–1	5–1	

Source: Football Web Pages
Legend: Blue = home team win; Yellow = draw; Red = away team win.

=== Stadiums and locations ===
Locations of the Premier Division clubs
Greater London Premier Division football clubs

Club	Location	Stadium	Capacity
Billericay Town	Billericay	New Lodge	3,500
Bognor Regis Town	Bognor Regis	Nyewood Lane	4,500
Canvey Island	Canvey Island	Park Lane	4,500
Carshalton Athletic	Carshalton	War Memorial Sports Ground	5,000
Chatham Town	Chatham, Kent	The Bauvil Stadium	5,000
Cheshunt	Cheshunt	Theobalds Lane	3,000
Concord Rangers	Canvey Island	Thames Road	3,300
Cray Wanderers	St Mary Cray	Hayes Lane (groundshare with Bromley)	6,000
Dulwich Hamlet	London (East Dulwich)	Champion Hill	3,334
Enfield Town	Enfield	Queen Elizabeth II Stadium	2,500
Folkestone Invicta	Folkestone	Cheriton Road	4,000
Haringey Borough	Tottenham	Coles Park	2,500
Hashtag United	Pitsea	Len Salmon Stadium	2,661
Hastings United	Hastings	The Pilot Field	4,050
Hornchurch	Hornchurch	Hornchurch Stadium	3,500
Horsham	Horsham	The Camping World Community Stadium	3,000
Kingstonian	Kingston upon Thames	Imperial Fields (groundshare with Tooting & Mitcham United)	2,700
Lewes	Lewes	The Dripping Pan	3,000
Margate	Margate	Hartsdown Park	3,000
Potters Bar Town	Potters Bar	Parkfield	2,000
Whitehawk	Brighton (Whitehawk)	The Enclosed Ground	3,126
Wingate & Finchley	Finchley	The Maurice Rebak Stadium	1,500

== North Division ==
Isthmian League North Division
- Season: 2023–24
- Champions: Lowestoft Town
- Promoted: Lowestoft Town; Bowers & Pitsea
- Relegated: East Thurrock United (resigned); New Salamis (folded); Stowmarket Town

The North Division comprises 20 teams, 14 of which competed in the previous season. This was the first season with play-offs at step five, meaning that just two teams would be relegated from the division.

=== Team changes ===
To the North Division

Promoted from the Eastern Counties League

- Ipswich Wanderers

Promoted from the Essex Senior League

- Enfield
- Redbridge

Relegated from the Premier Division

- Bowers & Pitsea
- Brightlingsea Regent

Transferred from Southern League Division One Central

- Walthamstow

From the North Division

Promoted to the Southern League Premier Division Central

- AFC Sudbury

Promoted to the Premier Division

- Hashtag United

Relegated to the Essex Senior League

- Coggeshall Town
- Great Wakering Rovers
- Hullbridge Sports
- Tilbury

=== North Division table ===
Pos	Team	Pld	W	D	L	GF	GA	GD	Pts	Promotion, qualification or relegation
1	Lowestoft Town (C, P)	36	25	3	8	91	41	+50	78	Promotion to the Southern League Premier Central
2	Bury Town	36	22	8	6	89	47	+42	74	Qualification for the play-offs
3	Felixstowe & Walton United	36	22	8	6	78	40	+38	74	Qualification for the play-offs
4	Bowers & Pitsea (O, P)	36	23	4	9	70	49	+21	73	Qualification for the play-offs
5	Brentwood Town	36	22	6	8	69	33	+36	72	Qualification for the play-offs
6	Walthamstow	36	18	8	10	63	50	+13	62	
7	Heybridge Swifts	36	17	9	10	53	45	+8	60	
8	Brightlingsea Regent	36	18	3	15	66	51	+15	57	
9	Basildon United	36	16	4	16	66	62	+4	52	
10	Gorleston	36	14	8	14	55	49	+6	50	
11	Maldon & Tiptree	36	15	4	17	68	64	+4	49	
12	Wroxham	36	13	9	14	47	47	0	48	
13	Redbridge	36	13	8	15	57	60	−3	47	
14	Witham Town	36	12	9	15	56	62	−6	45	
15	New Salamis (Note: New Salamis' first team folded at the end of this season.)	36	9	8	19	58	82	−24	35	Resignation from the league
16	Grays Athletic	36	9	6	21	46	69	−23	33	
17	Ipswich Wanderers	36	8	5	23	38	75	−37	29	
18	Enfield	36	6	4	26	33	86	−53	22	Transfer to the Southern League Division One Central
19	Stowmarket Town (R)	36	0	6	30	34	125	−91	6	Relegation to the Eastern Counties League
20	East Thurrock United (Note: East Thurrock United folded in September 2023; the club's playing record of Pld3 W1 D1 L1 GF4 GA6 Pts4 was expunged.)	0	0	0	0	0	0	0	0	Resignation from the league

Source: Isthmian League
Rules for classification: 1) points; 2) goal difference; 3) number of goals scored; 4) number of matches won; 5) head-to-head results
(C) Champions; (O) Play-off winners; (P) Promoted; (R) Relegated

=== Play-offs ===
Semi-finals
2	Bury Town	1
5	Brentwood Town	3
3	Felixstowe & Walton United	2 (2)
4	Bowers & Pitsea	2 (4)

Final
5	Brentwood Town	1 (2)
4	Bowers & Pitsea	1 (3)

==== Semi-finals ====
30 April	Felixstowe & Walton United	2–2 (a.e.t.) (2–4 p)	Bowers & Pitsea	Felixstowe
19:45	Ainsley (yellow card) 21'; Mayhew 45+2'; Aitkens (yellow card) 75'; Hitter 90+1'; Blunkell (yellow card)	Report	Addy 18'; Price (yellow card) 60'; Vaivada 78'	Stadium: The Goldstar Ground; Attendance: 445
	Penalties
	Hitter (penalty scored); Fowkes (penalty missed); Mayhew (penalty missed); Whight (penalty scored)		(penalty scored) Okonkwo; (penalty scored) Vaivada; (penalty missed) Millar; (penalty scored) Sotoyinbo; (penalty scored) Williamson

30 April	Bury Town	1–3 (a.e.t.)	Brentwood Town	Bury St Edmunds
19:45	Curry (yellow card) 77'; Jolland (yellow card) 85' (goal) 100'	Report	McKenzie 95'; Ogunleye 110' (yellow card) 120+1'; Minter (yellow card) 120'; Ngandu 120+6'	Stadium: Ram Meadow; Attendance: 1,122

==== Final ====
4 May	Bowers & Pitsea	1–1 (a.e.t.) (3–2 p)	Brentwood Town	Pitsea
15:00				Stadium: Len Salmon Stadium; Attendance: 1,101

=== Results table ===
Home \ Away	BAS	B&P	BRE	BRI	BUR	ENF	FEL	GOR	GRA	HEY	IPS	LOW	MAL	NEW	RED	STO	WAL	WIT	WRO
Basildon United		1–2	0–1	2–1	1–3	2–0	2–4	2–1	2–1	1–2	0–1	1–1	2–1	1–0	2–1	4–2	2–3	4–0	1–0
Bowers & Pitsea	2–1		0–2	0–1	1–0	1–0	2–1	1–1	3–1	3–1	1–0	1–3	2–3	3–2	3–0	3–2	2–4	2–0	3–2
Brentwood Town	2–3	1–3		0–2	0–0	1–0	2–2	1–1	3–1	0–1	1–0	0–1	3–2	1–1	1–1	9–0	2–0	0–0	2–0
Brightlingsea Regent	1–2	4–1	2–0		1–4	3–1	0–2	0–1	2–1	2–2	4–1	2–1	3–0	1–0	3–3	2–0	2–3	1–3	2–3
Bury Town	2–6	2–2	2–1	1–2		6–0	3–3	2–2	3–1	3–1	4–3	4–1	1–0	2–1	2–0	4–1	4–0	3–0	0–0
Enfield	0–3	1–3	0–2	1–4	2–7		1–2	0–3	3–0	1–3	0–0	0–5	0–1	3–1	0–1	4–0	0–2	1–5	3–2
Felixstowe & Walton United	1–0	3–2	1–0	5–3	3–0	5–1		4–0	3–2	0–0	1–1	3–0	0–1	6–1	4–0	2–1	2–0	1–0	0–2
Gorleston	3–3	0–2	2–3	0–1	0–3	4–1	1–0		0–2	0–0	2–0	1–2	4–2	3–1	1–0	1–1	0–0	4–0	1–1
Grays Athletic	1–1	0–2	0–3	1–0	2–2	4–0	0–3	0–2		1–3	3–2	2–3	0–1	2–4	2–0	3–1	0–4	3–1	1–1
Heybridge Swifts	1–1	2–2	1–2	1–0	6–1	1–1	2–3	2–1	2–0		2–0	2–1	1–0	2–1	0–0	3–0	1–1	0–1	0–1
Ipswich Wanderers	2–1	0–2	1–6	0–7	2–0	0–1	1–2	1–2	1–4	1–2		2–1	1–2	2–0	0–5	2–2	0–2	2–0	0–2
Lowestoft Town	5–1	2–0	1–2	2–1	0–0	2–0	2–0	2–3	2–0	6–0	1–2		2–0	6–1	5–1	2–1	3–2	3–1	4–0
Maldon & Tiptree	3–2	0–3	1–3	2–0	2–4	3–2	2–2	2–0	1–1	1–3	2–0	2–3		2–2	4–2	5–1	4–0	3–4	5–1
New Salamis	4–0	1–1	0–3	4–2	0–5	3–2	1–1	2–0	3–2	0–3	3–2	1–3	1–1		1–2	5–1	1–3	1–2	1–2
Redbridge	1–0	2–3	1–3	1–1	1–2	3–0	0–1	1–0	4–1	2–1	1–4	2–4	4–3	3–3		2–1	2–3	2–0	0–0
Stowmarket Town	3–4	1–3	1–3	0–1	0–5	2–2	2–2	0–6	0–2	0–1	1–1	0–6	2–5	3–4	0–5		0–3	1–1	2–3
Walthamstow	4–2	1–2	1–2	0–2	1–1	1–0	1–1	4–2	1–1	5–1	2–1	2–2	1–0	2–2	0–2	3–1		0–0	2–0
Witham Town	1–5	2–4	1–3	0–1	0–2	1–1	3–2	3–2	2–0	3–0	2–2	1–2	3–2	2–2	1–1	8–0	3–0		2–2
Wroxham	2–1	2–0	0–1	3–2	1–2	0–1	1–3	0–1	1–1	0–0	4–0	0–2	1–0	3–0	1–1	6–1	0–2	0–0	

Source: Football Web Pages
Legend: Blue = home team win; Yellow = draw; Red = away team win.

=== Stadiums and locations ===
Locations of North Division clubs

Club	Location	Stadium	Capacity
Basildon United	Basildon	Gardiners Close	2,000
Bowers & Pitsea	Pitsea	Len Salmon Stadium	3,500
Brentwood Town	Brentwood	The Brentwood Centre Arena	1,800
Brightlingsea Regent	Brightlingsea	North Road	2,000
Bury Town	Bury St Edmunds	Ram Meadow	3,500
East Thurrock United	Corringham	Rookery Hill	3,500
Enfield	Bishop's Stortford	Woodside Park (groundshare with Bishop's Stortford)	4,525 (525 seated)
Felixstowe & Walton United	Felixstowe	Dellwood Avenue	2,000
Gorleston	Gorleston-on-Sea	Wellesley Recreation Ground (groundshare with Great Yarmouth Town)	3,600 (500 seated)
Grays Athletic	Grays	Parkside (groundshare with Aveley)	3,500
Heybridge Swifts	Heybridge	Scraley Road	3,000
Ipswich Wanderers	Rushmere	Humber Doucy Lane	550
Lowestoft Town	Lowestoft	Crown Meadow	3,000
Maldon & Tiptree	Maldon	Wallace Binder Ground	2,000
New Salamis	Bowes Park	Coles Park (groundshare with Haringey Borough)	3,000
Redbridge	Barkingside	Oakside Stadium	3,000 (316 seated)
Stowmarket Town	Stowmarket	Greens Meadow	1,000
Walthamstow	London (Walthamstow)	Wadham Lodge	3,500
Witham Town	Witham	Spa Road	2,500
Wroxham	Wroxham	Trafford Park	2,500

== South Central Division ==
Isthmian League South Central Division
- Season: 2023–24
- Champions: Chertsey Town
- Promoted: Chertsey Town; Marlow
- Relegated: Chipstead; Corinthian-Casuals

The South Central Division consists of 21 teams, 14 of which competed in the previous campaign. It had been intended that there be 20 teams, but Marlow, due to have transferred to the Southern League, successfully appealed against the transfer. Only two teams would be relegated following the restructuring of the step 4/5 promotion.

=== Team changes ===
To the South Central Division

Promoted from the Combined Counties League Premier Division North

- Ascot United

Promoted from the Combined Counties League Premier Division South

- Badshot Lea
- Raynes Park Vale

Relegated from the Premier Division

- Corinthian-Casuals

Relegated from the Southern League Premier Division South

- Hartley Wintney
- Metropolitan Police

From the South Central Division

Promoted to the Southern League Premier Division South

- Basingstoke Town
- Walton & Hersham

Relegated to the Combined Counties Premier Division North

- Bedfont Sports

Relegated to the Combined Counties Premier Division South

- Tooting & Mitcham United

Transferred to South East Division

- Merstham

=== South Central Division table ===
Pos	Team	Pld	W	D	L	GF	GA	GD	Pts	Promotion, qualification or relegation
1	Chertsey Town (C, P)	40	31	8	1	103	32	+71	100 (Note: Chertsey Town were deducted one point having fielded an ineligible player on 3 October 2023 in a 1–1 draw with Binfield.)	Promotion to the Southern League Premier South
2	Marlow (O, P)	40	29	2	9	106	49	+57	89	Qualification for the play-offs
3	Leatherhead	40	27	5	8	71	32	+39	86	Qualification for the play-offs
4	Southall	40	26	5	9	79	43	+36	83	Qualification for the play-offs
5	Westfield	40	25	8	7	81	50	+31	83	Qualification for the play-offs
6	Raynes Park Vale	40	23	9	8	70	49	+21	78	
7	Hanworth Villa	40	18	11	11	77	59	+18	65	
8	Thatcham Town	40	18	8	14	72	62	+10	62	Transfer to the Southern League Division One South
9	South Park	40	17	10	13	72	61	+11	61	
10	Hartley Wintney	40	16	7	17	64	79	−15	55	
11	Badshot Lea	40	15	9	16	65	70	−5	54	
12	Uxbridge	40	15	6	19	70	71	−1	51	
13	Ascot United	40	13	6	21	56	67	−11	45	
14	Sutton Common Rovers	40	11	7	22	49	69	−20	40	
15	Northwood	40	11	6	23	69	75	−6	39	Transfer to the Southern League Division One Central
16	Metropolitan Police	40	9	10	21	37	63	−26	37	
17	Ashford Town	40	10	6	24	42	70	−28	36	
18	Guernsey	40	9	7	24	68	97	−29	34	
19	Binfield	40	8	10	22	59	109	−50	34	
20	Chipstead (R)	40	8	6	26	44	80	−36	30	Relegation to the Combined Counties League
21	Corinthian-Casuals (R)	40	5	6	29	34	101	−67	21	Relegation to the Combined Counties League

Source: Isthmian League
Rules for classification: 1) points; 2) goal difference; 3) number of goals scored; 4) number of matches won; 5) head-to-head results
(C) Champions; (O) Play-off winners; (P) Promoted; (R) Relegated

=== Play-offs ===
Semi-finals
2	Marlow	3
5	Westfield	2
3	Leatherhead	1 (3)
4	Southall	1 (2)

Final
2	Marlow	3
3	Leatherhead	1

==== Semi-finals ====
1 May	Marlow	3–2 (a.e.t.)	Westfield	Marlow
19:45	Tarpey (yellow card) 35'; Mulley 58' (yellow card) 90+1'; Rogalski 84'; Masters (yellow card) 90+5'; Ndozid (yellow card) 90+7'; Curtis 96'; Watkins (yellow card) 120+5'	Report	Wright 68' (yellow card) 96'; Huckle 87'; Taylor (yellow card) 104'; Rowe (yellow card) 120+5'	Stadium: Alfred Davis Memorial Ground; Attendance: 614; Referee: Tolu Songowawa

1 May	Leatherhead	1–1 (a.e.t.) (3–2 p)	Southall	Leatherhead
19:45	Cox 61'	Report	Thompson-Brissett 47' (yellow card) 52'; Nolan (yellow card) 66'; Alabi (yellow card) 95'	Stadium: Fetcham Grove; Attendance: 1,053; Referee: Lawrence Torz-Brown
	Penalties
	Saraiva (penalty missed); Cox (penalty scored); Lawson (penalty scored); Puemo (penalty missed)		Penalty missed Penalty scored

==== Final ====
5 May	Marlow	3–1	Leatherhead	Marlow
15:00	Ndozid 56'; Rogers 61'; Rogalski 66'	Report	Robinson 87'	Stadium: Alfred Davis Memorial Ground; Attendance: 1,589; Referee: Chay Hathway

=== Stadiums and locations ===
Locations of South Central Division clubs
Greater London South Central Division clubs

Club	Location	Stadium	Capacity
Ascot United	Ascot	The Racecourse Ground	1,150
Ashford Town	Ashford, Surrey	Robert Parker Stadium	2,550
Badshot Lea	Wrecclesham	Westfield Lane	1,200
Binfield	Binfield	Hill Farm Lane	1,000
Chertsey Town	Chertsey	Alwyns Lane	2,500
Chipstead	Chipstead	High Road	2,000
Corinthian-Casuals	Tolworth	King George's Field	2,700
Guernsey	Saint Peter Port	Footes Lane	5,000
Hanworth Villa	Hanworth	Rectory Meadow	1,000
Hartley Wintney	Hartley Wintney	The Memorial Playing Fields	2,000
Leatherhead	Leatherhead	Fetcham Grove	3,400
Marlow	Marlow	Alfred Davis Memorial Ground	3,000
Metropolitan Police	East Molesey	Imber Court	3,000
Northwood	Northwood	Northwood Park	3,075
Raynes Park Vale	Raynes Park	Grand Drive	1,500
South Park	Reigate	King George's Field	2,000
Southall	Stanwell	Robert Parker Stadium (groundshare with Ashford Town)	2,550
Sutton Common Rovers	Tandridge, Surrey	Church Road (groundshare with AFC Whyteleafe)	2,000
Thatcham Town	Thatcham	Waterside Park	1,500
Uxbridge	West Drayton	Honeycroft	3,770
Westfield	Woking (Westfield)	Woking Park	1,000

== South East Division ==
Isthmian League South East Division
- Season: 2023–24
- Champions: Cray Valley Paper Mills
- Promoted: Cray Valley Paper Mills; Chichester City
- Relegated: Erith & Belvedere

The South East Division consists of 20 teams, 14 of which competed in the previous season. Only two teams would be relegated following the restructuring of the step 4/5 promotion.

=== Team changes ===
To the South East Division

Promoted from the Southern Combination League

- Broadbridge Heath

Promoted from the Southern Counties East League

- Erith & Belvedere
- Phoenix Sports

Promoted from the Wessex League

- Horndean

Relegated from the Premier Division

- Herne Bay

Transferred from South Central Division

- Merstham

From the South East Division

Promoted to the Premier Division

- Chatham Town
- Whitehawk

Relegated to the Southern Combination League

- Haywards Heath Town

Relegated to the Southern Counties East League

- Corinthian
- Faversham Town
- VCD Athletic

=== South East Division table ===
Pos	Team	Pld	W	D	L	GF	GA	GD	Pts	Promotion, qualification or relegation
1	Cray Valley Paper Mills (C, P)	38	29	8	1	103	32	+71	95	Promotion to the Premier Division
2	Ramsgate	38	28	5	5	106	41	+65	89	Qualification for the play-offs
3	Sittingbourne	38	22	9	7	82	41	+41	75	Qualification for the play-offs
4	Three Bridges	38	22	7	9	98	68	+30	73	Qualification for the play-offs
5	Chichester City (O, P)	38	21	6	11	83	43	+40	69	Qualification for the play-offs
6	Lancing	38	19	7	12	71	66	+5	64	
7	Sheppey United	38	18	7	13	76	57	+19	61	
8	Herne Bay	38	16	11	11	74	63	+11	59	
9	Broadbridge Heath	38	14	10	14	59	56	+3	52	
10	Sevenoaks Town	38	13	7	18	61	65	−4	46	
11	Ashford United	38	14	3	21	57	82	−25	45	
12	Burgess Hill Town	38	11	11	16	59	70	−11	44	
13	Hythe Town	38	12	8	18	54	71	−17	44	
14	Horndean	38	12	7	19	57	76	−19	43	Transfer to the South Central Division
15	Merstham	38	11	8	19	58	72	−14	41	
16	Phoenix Sports	38	10	8	20	52	91	−39	38	
17	Littlehampton Town	38	10	7	21	49	76	−27	37	
18	East Grinstead Town	38	9	7	22	52	86	−34	34	
19	Beckenham Town	38	7	8	23	57	93	−36	29	Reprieve from relegation
20	Erith & Belvedere (R)	38	6	8	24	27	86	−59	26	Relegation to the Southern Counties East League

Source: Football Web Pages
Rules for classification: 1) points; 2) goal difference; 3) number of goals scored; 4) number of matches won; 5) head-to-head results
(C) Champions; (O) Play-off winners; (P) Promoted; (R) Relegated

=== Play-offs ===
Semi-finals
2	Ramsgate	0
5	Chichester City	1
3	Sittingbourne	1
4	Three Bridges	2

Final
5	Chichester City	5
4	Three Bridges	0

==== Semi-finals ====
30 April	Ramsgate	0–1	Chichester City	Ramsgate
19:45		Report	Cody (yellow card) 63'; Jammeh 87'	Stadium: Southwood Stadium; Attendance: 1,462

30 April	Sittingbourne	1–2	Three Bridges	Sittingbourne
19:45	Harris 22'	Report	Irving (yellow card) 41'; Jalloh 71' (pen.); Sheik (yellow card) 82'; Leighton 87'	Stadium: The Roman Stadium; Attendance: 809; Referee: Ross Murphy

==== Final ====
3 May	Three Bridges	0–5	Chichester City	Three Bridges
19:45				Stadium: Jubilee Field; Attendance: 1,192

=== Results table ===
Home \ Away	ASH	BEC	BRO	BUR	CHI	CRA	EAS	ERI	HER	HOR	HYT	LAN	LIT	MER	PHO	RAM	SEV	SHE	SIT	THR
Ashford United		3–2	2–3	1–0	1–3	0–2	0–1	4–1	3–1	3–1	0–1	3–4	1–0	3–2	3–5	2–3	2–1	3–2	1–5	3–2
Beckenham Town	0–1		0–4	0–4	0–2	0–6	3–0	1–1	3–3	3–1	5–2	2–3	1–6	2–1	1–2	2–5	2–2	4–2	2–3	1–2
Broadbridge Heath	1–0	3–3		0–0	0–3	2–3	0–1	1–0	1–1	1–1	2–0	2–2	2–0	6–6	3–1	0–2	4–2	2–2	0–2	3–0
Burgess Hill Town	3–0	1–0	0–0		3–5	1–4	3–0	0–2	2–1	1–0	1–2	2–4	1–1	5–1	2–2	1–2	1–0	1–2	1–1	2–3
Chichester City	1–2	4–0	2–1	3–0		0–3	7–1	6–1	1–3	1–3	5–0	3–0	2–0	1–1	1–3	2–4	1–0	2–0	0–2	0–1
Cray Valley Paper Mills	2–0	2–1	2–2	5–0	0–0		4–1	3–0	4–2	1–1	2–0	1–1	2–2	4–1	3–1	1–1	2–1	3–1	2–2	4–5
East Grinstead Town	6–0	1–1	1–1	1–5	1–1	0–4		1–1	1–2	4–0	2–3	0–2	5–1	4–1	1–1	2–6	0–3	1–2	1–2	1–2
Erith & Belvedere	0–1	0–2	1–2	2–2	1–1	1–3	0–4		1–1	1–2	1–0	0–3	2–1	3–1	1–0	0–5	0–1	0–4	0–4	0–2
Herne Bay	2–2	3–2	3–1	2–2	3–3	0–1	3–2	0–0		4–3	1–2	3–1	4–1	2–0	2–0	1–2	1–2	1–2	0–3	3–3
Horndean	2–1	4–1	4–0	1–0	0–3	0–2	1–3	2–0	2–4		0–4	1–1	2–1	1–3	4–4	1–0	3–0	2–5	0–3	1–3
Hythe Town	2–2	1–2	2–1	2–2	0–2	0–4	4–0	1–3	1–3	0–4		1–1	1–0	0–1	0–1	2–2	4–0	2–2	0–1	1–1
Lancing	4–2	1–1	2–1	0–1	0–4	0–1	3–0	3–1	0–3	4–1	2–1		3–2	1–0	4–2	4–2	1–2	1–2	0–0	4–0
Littlehampton Town	1–0	2–1	2–1	4–1	0–3	0–5	1–2	1–1	1–2	1–1	4–4	0–1		2–1	2–1	1–2	1–5	0–6	1–1	0–0
Merstham	2–2	4–3	0–1	3–1	0–3	0–1	1–1	2–0	2–2	1–1	0–2	1–2	0–1		3–0	0–3	5–0	3–2	0–1	3–2
Phoenix Sports	3–1	3–3	0–4	2–2	0–0	2–7	0–0	0–0	0–2	1–0	0–4	1–2	0–2	2–1		0–2	3–2	3–1	1–2	2–6
Ramsgate	4–0	1–0	1–0	4–2	4–0	2–2	5–0	4–1	3–1	2–0	3–1	7–2	4–0	0–2	9–1		1–0	0–0	2–2	1–2
Sevenoaks Town	1–2	1–1	0–1	3–3	1–0	0–1	4–1	3–0	1–2	3–2	0–0	4–2	2–1	2–2	1–2	4–2		0–1	2–2	2–2
Sheppey United	5–1	2–0	1–0	0–0	1–3	0–2	3–0	3–0	2–2	2–3	3–0	3–0	2–1	0–1	4–0	0–1	3–4		3–3	1–0
Sittingbourne	1–0	4–0	0–1	5–0	0–3	2–3	2–0	6–0	2–0	3–0	0–1	2–2	1–4	3–0	2–1	2–3	2–1	2–2		4–1
Three Bridges	3–2	3–2	4–2	2–3	3–2	0–2	4–2	6–1	1–1	2–2	8–3	4–1	3–1	3–3	4–2	0–2	2–1	6–0	3–0	

Source: Football Web Pages
Legend: Blue = home team win; Yellow = draw; Red = away team win.

=== Stadiums and locations ===
Locations of South East Division clubs
Greater London South East Division football clubs

Club	Location	Stadium	Capacity
Ashford United	Ashford, Kent	The Homelands	3,200
Beckenham Town	Beckenham	Eden Park Avenue	4,000
Broadbridge Heath	Broadbridge Heath	High Wood Hill Sports Ground	
Burgess Hill Town	Burgess Hill	Leylands Park	2,500
Chichester City	Chichester	Oaklands Park	2,000
Cray Valley Paper Mills	Eltham	Badgers Sports Ground	1,000
East Grinstead Town	East Grinstead	East Court	1,500
Erith & Belvedere	Welling	Park View Road (groundshare with Welling United)	4,000
Herne Bay	Herne Bay	Winch's Field	4,000
Horndean	Horndean	Five Heads Park	2,000
Hythe Town	Hythe	Reachfields Stadium	3,000
Lancing	Lancing	Culver Road	1,500
Littlehampton Town	Littlehampton	The Sportsfield	4,000
Merstham	Merstham	Moatside	2,500
Phoenix Sports	Barnehurst	The Mayplace Ground	2,000
Ramsgate	Ramsgate	Southwood Stadium	2,500
Sevenoaks Town	Sevenoaks	Greatness Park	1,000
Sheppey United	Isle of Sheppey	Holm Park	1,900
Sittingbourne	Sittingbourne	Woodstock Park	3,000
Three Bridges	Crawley (Three Bridges)	Jubilee Field	1,500

== See also ==
- Isthmian League
- 2023–24 Northern Premier League
- 2023–24 Southern League
