= Devid =

Devid is a given name, a variant spelling of David. It may refer to:

- Devid Striesow (born 1973), German actor
- Devid (footballer) (born 1996), Devid de Santana Silva, Brazilian football forward
- Devid Naryzhnyy (born 1999), Russian competitive ice dancer
- Devid Eugene Bouah (born 2001), Italian football defender

== See also ==
- David (disambiguation)
