= La Pairelle =

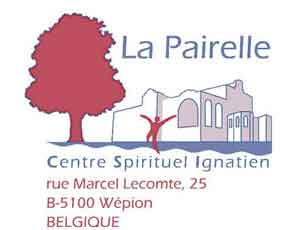

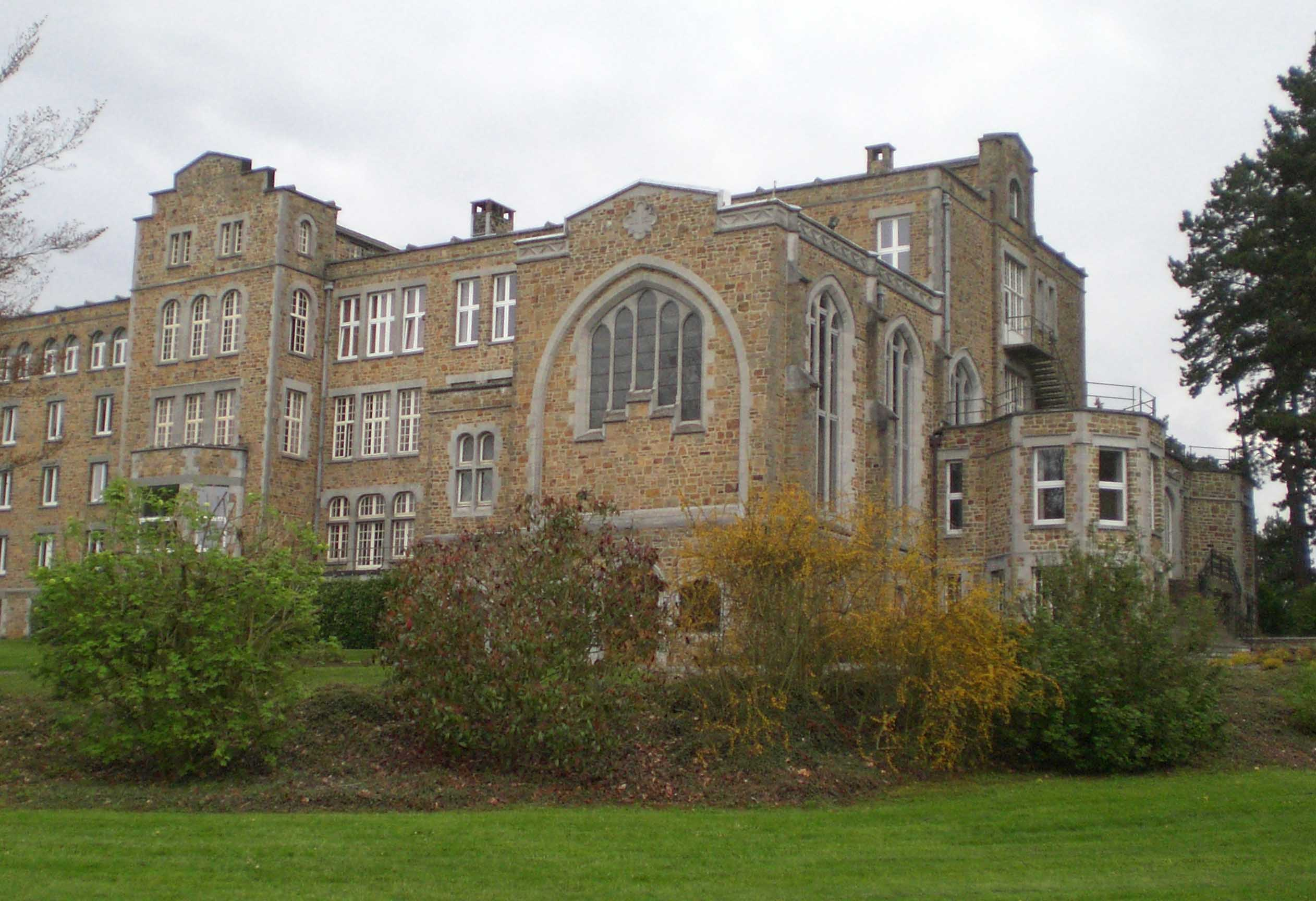
- Interactive map of the La Pairelle area
- Former names: Institut Saint-Bellarmin
- Alternative names: Centre Spirituel Ignatien La Pairelle

General information
- Type: Retreat Centre
- Location: Wepion, Rue Marcel Lecomte 25, Namur, Belgium
- Coordinates: 50.43431°N 4.85916°E
- Completed: 1932
- Opened: 1971
- Affiliation: Jesuits

Technical details
- Grounds: 17 hectares

Design and construction
- Architect: Albert Ghequière

Website
- csilapairelle.be

La Pairelle or its full name Centre Spirituel Ignatien La Pairelle is a Catholic spirituality and retreat centre in Wépion, Namur, Belgium. It was built in 1932 by the Jesuits and was designed by Albert Ghequière with a chapel built in the Gothic Revival style. It is located off Rue Marcel Lecomte on a hill in the district of Wépion in Namur, overlooking the River Meuse. It is the only French-speaking Jesuit retreat centre in Belgium.

== History ==
=== Foundation ===
In 1611, the Jesuits arrived in Namur and founded the College of Namur at a site next to current Church of Saint Loup in the centre of the city. In 1773, the Jesuits were suppressed and the college became the Royal College. In 1831, the Jesuits returned and opened Collège Notre-Dame de la Paix on rue de Bruxelles. Over the next 100 years the college expanded with new faculties and programmes, eventually becoming the Université de Namur.

In 1932, La Pairelle was built. It was originally the St Bellarmine Institute (French: Institut Saint-Bellarmin). Named after Robert Bellarmine, it was a residence for the training of Jesuits who would study at the Université de Namur. In the building is a chapel in the Gothic Revival style. The building was designed by Albert Ghequière who also designed the Church of the Sacré-Cœur de Saint-Servais in Waterloo and Chapel of Saint-Thérèse in Namur. According to the Inventaire de patrimoine immobilier culturel of Wallonia, the style of the building is "neo-traditional". From 1935 to 1971, as part of the training for Jesuit missionaries in India, an Indological course, which included the teaching of Sanskrit was taught there.

=== Retreat centre ===
In 1971, the building was no longer used as a formation centre for Jesuits and instead became a retreat centre. Since then it has offered retreats and courses to people in Ignatian spirituality, which is inspired and taken from the Spiritual Exercises by Ignatius of Loyola.

=== Developments ===
In 1999, the Sisters of Saint Andrew moved into a house called Béthanie, which was once a farmhouse at La Pairelle. They also help with giving retreats at the centre. On 25 September 2022 it celebrated fifty years as a retreat centre with a Mass presided by the Bishop of Namur, Pierre Warin.

== See also ==
- List of Jesuit sites in Belgium
- Diocese of Namur
