= Daveed =

Daveed may refer to:

- Daveed (film), a 2025 Indian Malayalam-language action film
- Daveed Diggs (born 1982), American entertainer
- Daveed Gartenstein-Ross (born 1976), American author

== See also ==
- David (disambiguation)
