= Pelikan Łowicz =

Association football club in Poland

- Full name: Klub Sportowy Pelikan Łowicz
- Founded: 1945; 81 years ago
- Ground: Stadion Miejski
- Capacity: 2,072
- Chairman: Piotr Marciniak
- Manager: Piotr Kocęba
- League: III liga, group I
- 2025–26: IV liga Łódź, 1st of 18 (promoted)
- Website: www.pelikan.lowicz.pl
Home colours

Pelikan Łowicz (Polish pronunciation: [pɛˈlikan ˈwɔvitʂ]) is a Polish football club based in Łowicz. As of the 2026–27 season, they play in group I of the III liga, the fourth tier, after winning the IV liga Łódź in the 2025–26 season.

== Current squad ==
As of 4 August 2026

Note: Flags indicate national team as defined under FIFA eligibility rules; some limited exceptions apply. Players may hold more than one non-FIFA nationality.

No.	Pos.	Nation	Player
4	DF	POL	Kamil Niewiadomski
6	DF	POL	Tomasz Dąbrowski
7	MF	POL	Paweł Gierach
8	DF	POL	Adrian Dudziński
9	FW	POL	Maksymilian Czeczko
10	FW	POL	Dawid Dzięgielewski
11	MF	POL	Patryk Pierzak
14	DF	POL	Bartosz Biel
15	DF	POL	Bartosz Gapys
16	DF	POL	Jakub Skibiński
17	MF	POL	Adam Stankiewicz
18	MF	POL	Dawid Musialski
19	MF	POL	Radosław Kuciński
20	MF	POL	Maksym Czekała
21	MF	POL	Antoni Haczykowski

No.	Pos.	Nation	Player
22	MF	POL	Paweł Płacheta
24	GK	POL	Mateusz Wlazłowski (captain)
25	MF	POL	Bartosz Lus
27	DF	POL	Michał Ziębacz
29	FW	POL	Maksymilian Rożniatowski
30	DF	POL	Michał Kuciński
31	DF	POL	Maciej Rybus
33	GK	POL	Bartosz Ciupiński
47	DF	POL	Jakub Złoch
77	MF	POL	Krzysztof Supera
78	MF	POL	Ernest Kurzawa
98	GK	POL	Patryk Orzeł
—	MF	POL	Oskar Koper
—	MF	POL	Martin Rachubiński
