= David Jay (disambiguation) =

David Jay (born 1982) is an American activist for the awareness of asexuality.

David Jay is also the name of:

- David J (born 1957), musician
- David Jaye (born 1958), American politician

== See also ==
- Jay David (disambiguation)
