= Malonne =

Sub-municipality of the city of Namur, Belgium

Malonne Malône (Walloon)
- Sub-municipality of Namur
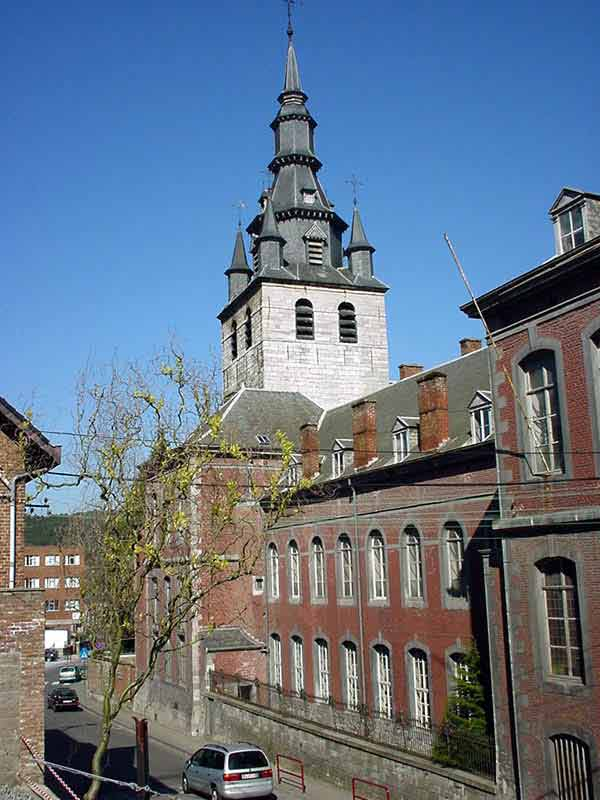

- Location of Malonne in Namur
- Interactive map of Malonne
- Location within Belgium Location within Namur Province
- Coordinates: 50°26′00″N 4°47′00″E
- Country: Belgium
- Community: French Community
- Region: Wallonia
- Province: Namur
- Arrondissement: Namur
- Municipality: Namur

Area
  - Total: 11.63 km^{2} (4.49 sq mi)

Population (2020-01-01)
  - Total: 5,525
  - Density: 475.1/km^{2} (1,230/sq mi)
- Postal codes: 5020
- Area codes: 081

Malonne (French pronunciation: [malɔn]; Walloon: Malône; Dutch: Maeslangen) is a sub-municipality of the city of Namur located in the province of Namur, Wallonia, Belgium. It was a separate municipality until 1977. On 1 January 1977, it was merged into Namur.

== Geography ==
Malonne lies on the shore of the Sambre, upstream of its confluent in Namur with the Meuse, making it the first village in the Entre-Sambre-et-Meuse region (literally: Between Sambre and Meuse) on the Sambre's side, Wepion being its mirror on the Meuse's side. Neighboring villages include Flawinne to the north, on the western shore of the Sambre, Salzinnes to the north-east (although usually considered to be part of Namur itself), Wepion to the south-east and Floreffe to the south and east.

Malonne is a village composed of many neighborhoods and localities, more or less distant from one another and sometimes separated by woods (which cover 27% of the village's surface). The main church, the old abbey, the current tomb of Saint Mutien-Marie and the different schools are found in the old heart of the village, buried in a val dug over time by the Landoir (a brook flowing into the Sambre). This part of the village is therefore called the Bottom of Malonne, or simply the Bottom. The area is hilly, with a 220 meters highest point while the Sambre, its lowest, flows at 85 meters.

Except for a few abandoned quarries, the terrain has been mostly untouched. Streams, however, have been more affected. The Sambre's natural flow was rectified to allow for easier navigation and the Landoir has been hidden under roads and houses in its lower part.

== History ==
The surroundings of Malonne have been inhabited for a long time, well into Prehistory. In the valleys of the Sambre and the Meuse, in the middle of which Malonne lies, several digging sites have revealed signs of dwelling as soon as the Paleolithic and throughout prehistory. Namur then developed in the Roman Era, a few kilometers from Malonne, having a strategical position between two streams. Proofs of Roman presence have been confirmed in the village, through a cemetery and an agricultural holding in the locality of Reumont dating to the Roman High-Empire.

Malonne would have been founded around the year 600, or at least it's at this date that it enters history. Its founder, Saint-Berthuin, was an Anglo-Saxon Bishop (probably Irish). Legend says an angel visited him in his dreams, and asked him to leave all his goods behind and establish a village between the Meuse and the Landoir. He is warmly welcomed by the landlords: Roga, the squire of Flawinne hands over her domain of Malonne, on which Saint-Berthuin builds his oratory; Odoacre, landlord of Floreffe, Gives him some land; and Pepin of Herstal gives away 5 smallholdings, of which possibly Reumont. These generous donations were commonplace during the Merovingian period. In exchange for poor or hard-to-defend lands, the mighty ensured good relations with the Church both on earth and -hopefully- in the heavens. The Vita Bertuini is the biggest source of information on the Saint's life.

During the Middle Ages, Malonne was under the authority of Liège. It seems Saint-Berthuin's ownership slowly lost its strength, and was replaced by a group of canons in charge of the domain.

== See also ==
- Aleksander of Malonne, bishop of Płock, Poland
- Walter of Malonne, bishop of Wrocław, Poland
