= St Mark's Church, Woking =

St Mark's Church
- St Mark's
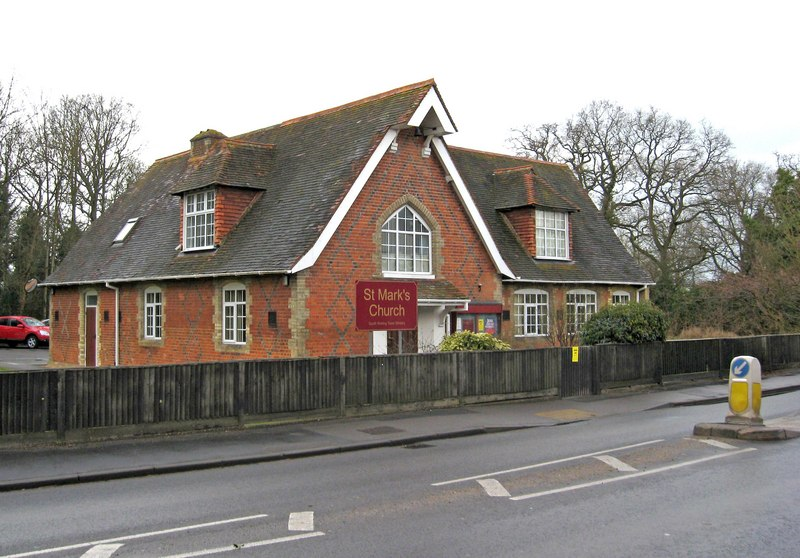
- St Mark's Church, Westfield
- St Mark's Church
- 51.3004°N 0.56107°W
- Location: Woking
- Country: England
- Denomination: Church of England
- Website: St Mark's website

Architecture
- Functional status: Active
- Completed: 1849

Administration
- Province: Canterbury
- Diocese: Guildford
- Parish: Parish of St Peter Woking

Clergy
- Vicar: Jonathan Thomas

St Mark's Church is located in Westfield, Woking, England. The church is in the Parish of the South Woking Team Ministry and the Diocese of Guildford.

== History ==
St Mark's Church was originally built as part of a school for two hundred pupils. In 1924, the building became a known as 'The Mission', until in 1970, the church adopted its current name. The church is unconsecrated, although eighty worshippers could comfortably fit into St Mark's.
