= Westfield Common =

Common land in Woking, Surrey, England

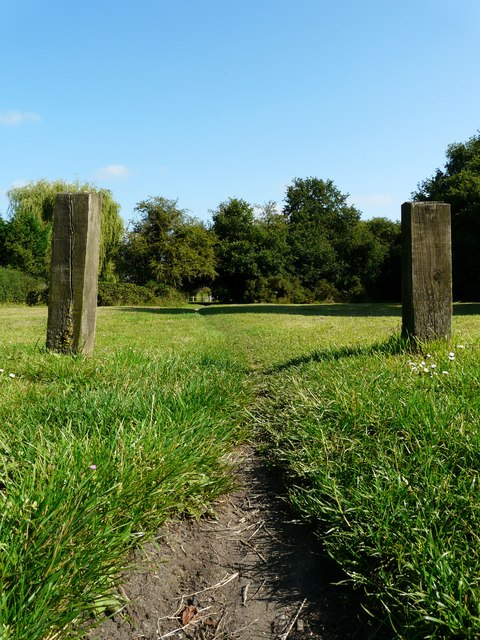

- Location within the United Kingdom
- Location: Woking, Surrey, England
- Coordinates: 51.292°N 0.560°W
- Governing body: Woking Borough Council

Westfield Common is an area of land in Westfield, Woking that is registered common land.

== Attributes ==
Westfield Common has boundaries that have been little reduced since 1719.

The common has been recognised by the local authority with a preliminary assessment by Natural England as a regionally important Site of Nature Conservation (SNCI). as it supports nationally scarce plants in the chamomile family and in aquatic species for example populations of great crested newts in two ponds. It has species-rich areas of: wet woodland, drains and ponds.

The Common gives its name to a residents association called the Westfield Common Residents Association (WCRA) open to all users of the common in the local authority.

== Commons registration ==
Under the First Wilson ministry's Commons Registration Act 1965 (CRA), a task and duty was given to top level local authorities to log and register all Common Land within England & Wales to ensure continued protection for public benefit and to mitigate the effects of 19th century inclosure resulting in perennial court claims of ownership by the aristocracy and other landowners to pieces of common land, even where used as such by the common people of a parish. The common was registered with registration number is CL 121 at Surrey County Council. Under the CRA section 9, having unclear ownership, most of which was possessed in common by its users, the land became subject to the protection of the local authority (Woking Borough Council). There are no pinpointed common rights such as taking of grass, berries or grazing recorded in the official register.

== Management Plan ==
A comprehensive management plan to improve the ecology and social benefits of the common has been developed by Surrey Wildlife Trust and formally adopted by Woking Borough Council.

== Gallery ==
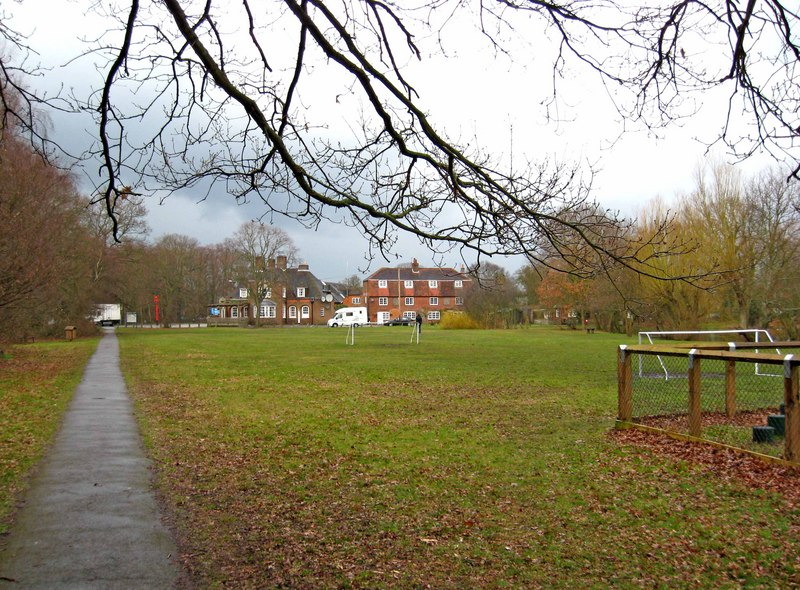
View of part of Westfield Common. There is a small Football Pitch where locals play

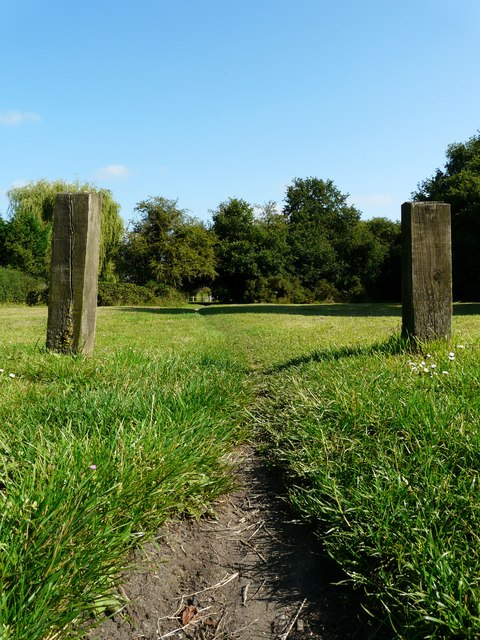
Path leading to Moor Lane

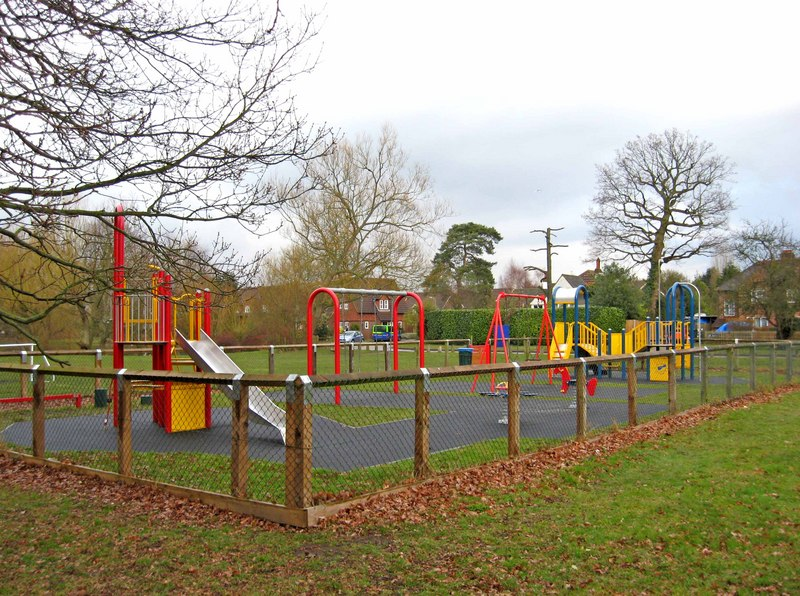
Westfield Common Play Area

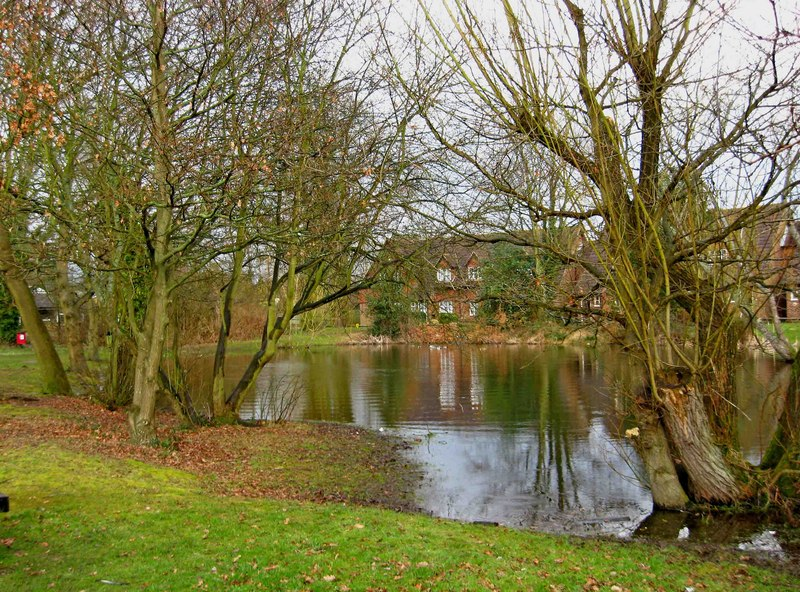
One of the Ponds on Westfield Common

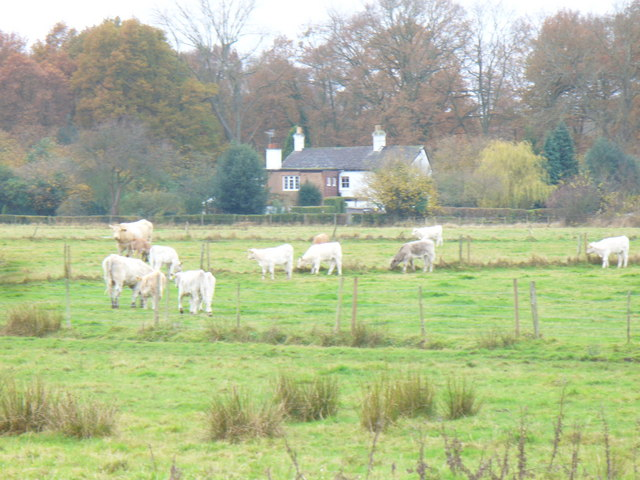
Animals on Westfield Common
