= Dávid family =

Hungarian noble family

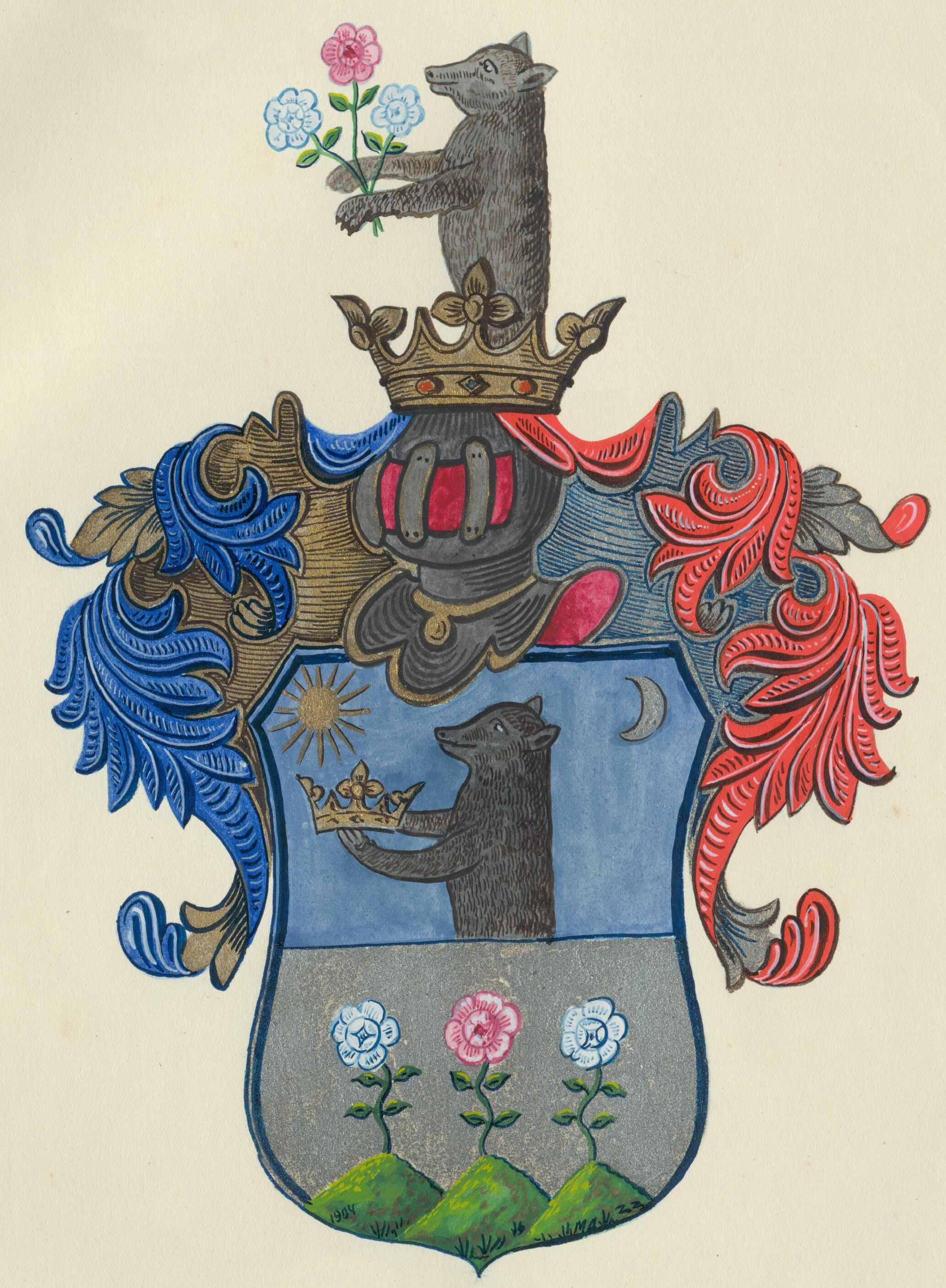
Coat of arms of the Dávid family

The Dávid family (Slovak: Dávidovci z Turčianskeho Petra, Hungarian: Dávid de Túróczszentpéter) was a Hungarian noble family in the Kingdom of Hungary, who owned estates in the Turóc County, Upper Hungary (today Turiec region, present-day Slovakia).

== History ==
In the 13th century, the Dávids were one of the many local noble families with title "nobilis" (the lowest-ranking nobility in the Kingdom, placed under the baron). The ancestors of the Dávid family were an older noble family of Záturecký from Záturčie (now part of Martin, Slovakia). Dávids had properties and manor houses in Záturčie, Istebné, Turčiansky Peter, Sasinkovo, Malý Báb and Veľky Báb.

In 1772 Károly Dávid and his son Antal were promoted to Barons by Maria Theresa, Queen of Hungary.
