= David (footballer, born June 1995) =

Brazilian footballer

Personal information
- Full name: David Rambo Becker
- Date of birth: 16 June 1995
- Place of birth: Itapiranga, Santa Catarina, Brazil
- Height: 1.91 m (6 ft 3 in)
- Position: Goalkeeper

Team information
- Current team: Inter de Lages

Youth career
- 2010–2014: Criciúma

Senior career*
Years	Team	Apps	(Gls)
2015–2016	Criciúma	4	(0)
2016	→ Correcaminos (loan)	10	(0)
2017	Inter de Lages	16	(0)
2018–	→ Paraná (loan)	3	(0)
2018	→ Penapolense (loan)	0	(0)
2020	→ Água Santa (loan)	9	(0)
2021	→ Oeste (loan)	1	(0)
2022	→ monsoon (loan)	1	(0)
2023–	→ EC São Bernardo (loan)	22	(0)
- * Club domestic league appearances and goals as of May 21, 2018

David Rambo Becker, or simply David (May 16, 1995, Itapiranga, Santa Catarina, Brazil), is a Brazilian professional footballer who currently plays for EC São Bernardo, loaned by Inter de Lages

== Career ==
=== Criciúma and U23 Brazilian team ===
Born in Itapiranga, the westernmost municipality in the Brazilian state of Santa Catarina, David was spotted by a talent hunter, who then introduced him to Criciúma. David was 15 years-old at that time. He debuted in the professional side of Criciúma's in 2015.

While in Criciúma, David was capped for the U23 national Brazilian team, which was getting prepared for the Rio Olympic Games. Besides some titles with Criciúma's U20 teams, David was runners-up in the U20 Copa do Brasil in 2013.

=== Experience in Mexico ===
In 2016, David was announced as the new goalkeeper of the Mexican club Reynosa. The announcement occurred in August. Five months later, in January 2017, he was hired by Correcaminos, the second Mexican club in his career.

=== Inter de Lages and return to Brazil ===
David returned to Brazil for the 2018 season. In the beginning of the year, he joined Inter de Lages, which plays the state of Santa Catarina's premier state league, as well as the Campeonato Brasileiro Série D, the fourth tier of the Brazilian football league system.
