= Dawid Dzięgielewski =

Polish footballer

Personal information
- Date of birth: 24 April 1993 (age 33)
- Place of birth: Skierniewice, Poland
- Height: 1.80 m (5 ft 11 in)
- Position: Midfielder

Team information
- Current team: Pelikan Łowicz
- Number: 10

Youth career
- –2009: Unia Skierniewice
- 2009–2011: Legia Warsaw

Senior career*
Years	Team	Apps	(Gls)
2011–2013	MKS Kutno	56	(16)
2013–2014	GKS Tychy	18	(1)
2014–2016	Pogoń Siedlce	45	(4)
2016–2017	GKS Bełchatów	26	(3)
2017–2018	Motor Lublin	29	(7)
2018–2020	Górnik Łęczna	45	(7)
2020–2021	Unia Skierniewice	30	(12)
2021–2023	Legia Warsaw II	48	(21)
2023–2024	Unia Skierniewice	14	(5)
2024–2025	Pogoń Grodzisk Mazowiecki	41	(8)
2025–2026	ŁKS Łomża	28	(7)
2026–	Pelikan Łowicz	0	(0)

International career
2009	Poland U17	1	(0)
- * Club domestic league appearances and goals as of 23:46, 3 June 2026 (UTC)

Dawid Dzięgielewski (born 24 April 1993) is a Polish professional footballer who plays as a midfielder for III liga club Pelikan Łowicz.

== Career ==
Dzięgielewski began his career at Unia Skierniewice. In March 2008, he moved to Legia Warszawa, playing for the club's youth team. In October 2009, he received call up to the Poland Under 17 squad. In August 2011, he joined III liga side MKS Kutno, where he played until the end of the 2012–13 season.

In July 2013, Dzięgielewski signed a one-and-a-half-year contract with I liga club GKS Tychy. He made his professional debut on 28 July 2013 in a 2–0 home win against Górnik Łęczna, coming on as a substitute in the 74th minute. He scored his first ever professional career goal in a 1–1 away draw with Stomil Olsztyn on 28 September 2013.

On 21 August 2014, it was announced that Dzięgielewski had signed with I liga side Pogoń Siedlce. He left the club at the end of the 2015–16 season, having made 45 league appearances, and scoring 4 goals. In August 2016, he signed one-year contract with GKS Bełchatów.

On 12 July 2017, Dzięgielewski moved to III liga club Motor Lublin. On 18 July 2018, he signed a contract with Górnik Łęczna.

== Honours ==
Górnik Łęczna

- II liga: 2019–20

Unia Skierniewice

- Polish Cup (Łódź regionals): 2020–21

Legia Warsaw II

- Polish Cup (Masovia regionals): 2021–22, 2022–23

Pogoń Grodzisk Wielkopolski

- III liga, group I: 2023–24
- Polish Cup (Masovia regionals): 2023–24
