= DAvE (Infineon) =

Software development & code generation tool

Digital Application Virtual Engineer (DAVE)
- Developer(s): Infineon Technologies
- Written in: Java, C
- Operating system: Microsoft Windows
- Available in: English
- Website: http://www.infineon.com/...

DAVE, or Digital Application Virtual Engineer, is a software development and code generation tool for microcontroller applications created in C/C++.

== Versions ==
=== Version 4 (beta) ===
The successor of the Eclipse-based development environment for C/C++ and/or graphical user interface (GUI) based development using application software (apps). It generates code for the latest XMC1xxx and XMC4xxx microcontrollers using ARM Cortex-M processors. DAVE software development kit (SDK) is a free integrated development environment to set up its own apps for DAVE.

=== Version 3 ===
Automatic code generation is based on the use of case-oriented, configurable, and tested software (SW) components, called DAVE Apps. They are comparable to executable and configurable application notes that can be downloaded from the web. The environment is based on Eclipse. Ordinary program development using C/C++ is also available. The targets for this development are XMC1xxx and XMC4xxx microcontrollers that use Cortex-M processors.

=== Previous versions ===
This version targets 32-bit microcontroller units (MCUs) (Infineon TriCore AUDO family), 16-bit MCUs (C166, XC166, XE166, and XC2000 family), and 8-bit MCUs (XC800 family) from Infineon. After the initial setup, the configuration wizard appears and gives an overview of the hardware peripherals, control units, and modules. The microcontroller application can be created by selecting the desired functions. At this step, module-specific functions must be selected for module initializing and control. Finally, the application source files will be generated by DAVE and embedded in a project in the selected development environment, where the code can still be modified or added to an extant project.

== DAVE-related software ==
Infineon also developed additional software that can be used in conjunction with DAVE for specific microcontroller families or additional hardware: DAVE Bench for XC800 is a platform providing free development tools for Infineon's 8-bit microcontroller family, based on the Open Source Eclipse architecture. DAVE Drive is a GUI-based software tool that allows application developers to create embedded software for the control of brushless synchronous three-phase motors.

== Alternative software ==
The Infineon MCUs are directly supported by several commercial products, depending on the selected MCU target. An embedded programming library for MATLAB exists. As a free alternative to DAVE, the developer can use the Keil Microcontroller Development Kit (MDK) Version 5. Code for the XMX1000 series up to 128 kB can be developed this way without purchasing a license from Keil.
