= Jay David =

Jay David can refer to:

- Jay David (musician) (born 1942), musician who played drums in Dr. Hook and the Medicine Show
- Jay David (actor), voice actor in the short film Dorothy Meets Ozma of Oz
- Jay David (author), author whose The Flying Saucer Reader inspired Calling Occupants of Interplanetary Craft
- An alias of spy Whittaker Chambers

== See also ==
- Jason David, American football player
