= David (footballer, born 1999) =

Brazilian footballer

Personal information
- Full name: David Jhefer Domingues dos Santos
- Date of birth: 10 July 1999 (age 27)
- Place of birth: Tucuruí, Brazil
- Height: 1.81 m (5 ft 11 in)
- Position: Forward

Team information
- Current team: Votuporanguense

Youth career
- –2015: Campo Mourão (futsal)
- 2016–2019: Toledo
- 2019: → Athletico Paranaense (loan)

Senior career*
Years	Team	Apps	(Gls)
2018–2021	Toledo	30	(4)
2021	Figueirense	0	(0)
2022	Grêmio Prudente	12	(1)
2023–	Votuporanguense	14	(4)
- * Club domestic league appearances and goals as of 23:58, 26 March 2023 (UTC)

David Jhefer Domingues dos Santos (born 10 July 1999), simply known as David, is a Brazilian footballer who currently plays for Votuporanguense.

== Career statistics ==
=== Club ===
As of 26 March 2023.

Club	Season	League			State league		Cup		Continental		Other		Total	
Club	Season	Division	Apps	Goals	Apps	Goals	Apps	Goals	Apps	Goals	Apps	Goals	Apps	Goals
Toledo	2018	Paranaense	—		3 (Note: Appearances in Campeonato Paranaense)	0	—		—		—		3	0
Toledo	2020	Série D	12	3	4	0	1	0	—		—		17	3
Toledo	2021	Paranaense	—		11	1	—		—		—		11	1
Toledo	Total		12	3	18	1	1	0	—		—		31	4
Figueirense	2021	Série C	0	0	—		—		—		—		0	0
Grêmio Prudente	2022	Paulista 2ª Divisão	—		12 (Note: Appearances in Campeonato Paulista Segunda Divisão)	1	—		—		—		12	1
Votuporanguense	2023	Paulista A3	—		14 (Note: Appearances in Campeonato Paulista Série A3)	4	—		—		—		14	4
Career total			12	3	44	6	1	0	0	0	0	0	57	9

== Honours ==
Grêmio Prudente

- Campeonato Paulista Segunda Divisão: 2022
