= Davíð =

Davíð [ˈtaːˌviːθ] is an Icelandic masculine given name and may refer to:

- Sigmundur Davíð Gunnlaugsson (born 1975), Icelandic politician and chairman of the Progressive Party
- Davíð Oddsson (1948–2026), Icelandic politician, Prime Minister of Iceland from 1991 to 2004
- Davíð Kristján Ólafsson (born 1995), Icelandic footballer
- Davíð Stefánsson (1895–1964), famous Icelandic poet and novelist, best known as a poet of humanity
- Davíð Viðarsson (born 1984), Icelandic football midfielder
