= Dawid Rogalski =

Polish footballer

Personal information
- Date of birth: 20 September 1996 (age 30)
- Place of birth: Szczytno, Poland
- Height: 1.84 m (6 ft 0 in)
- Position: Forward

Team information
- Current team: Dorking Wanderers
- Number: 30

Youth career
- White Wings
- Greenford Celtic
- 2011–2012: Wealdstone
- 2012–2013: Spartans Youth
- 2013–2014: Harefield United
- 2014–2015: Maidenhead United

Senior career*
Years	Team	Apps	(Gls)
2015–2017	Maidenhead United	1	(0)
2017	→ PFC Victoria London (loan)	1	(0)
2017–2019	GKS Tychy	0	(0)
2018–2019	→ Gryf Wejherowo (loan)	33	(11)
2019–2020	GKS Katowice	25	(10)
2020–2021	Resovia Rzeszów	14	(0)
2021–2022	Chalfont St Peter	15	(7)
2022–2024	Marlow	64	(43)
2024–2026	Walton & Hersham	79	(46)
2026–	Dorking Wanderers	11	(8)
- * Club domestic league appearances and goals as of 12:41, 31 October 2026 (UTC)

Dawid Rogalski (born 20 September 1996) is a Polish footballer who plays as a forward for National League South club Dorking Wanderers.

== Career ==
Rogalski was born in Poland but moved to England at the age of 5. He played for various non-league sides before joining the academy of Maidenhead United. In January 2015, he made his only competitive senior appearance for Maidenhead United, coming on as a substitute in a National League South match against Bath City. In January 2017, he spent time on loan with Middlesex County League side PFC Victoria London. In July 2017, he returned to Poland to join Tychy, signing a two-year contract. The following month he made his debut, playing the first half in a Polish Cup match against KS Cracovia. He spent the following season on loan at II liga side Gryf Wejherowo. In July 2019, he joined Katowice on a one-year contract. In August 2020, he moved up a division, signing a one-year contract with Resovia Rzeszów. He left them by mutual consent on 21 January 2021. Later in the year he returned to England and joined Isthmian League club Chalfont St Peter. Rogalski joined Marlow for the 2022–23 season. After two prolific seasons with the club, he joined Walton & Hersham ahead of the 2024–25 season.

On 13 August 2026, Rogalski agreed to join National League South side, Dorking Wanderers despite initially starting the season with Walton & Hersham.

== Career statistics ==
As of match played 27 October 2026

Appearances and goals by club, season and competition
Club	Season	League			National cup (Note: Includes Polish Cup, FA Cup)		League cup		Other		Total	
Club	Season	Division	Apps	Goals	Apps	Goals	Apps	Goals	Apps	Goals	Apps	Goals
Maidenhead United	2014–15	Conference South	1	0	0	0	—		0	0	1	0
Maidenhead United	2015–16	National League South	0	0	0	0	—		0	0	0	0
Maidenhead United	2016–17	National League South	0	0	0	0	—		0	0	0	0
Maidenhead United	Total		1	0	0	0	—		0	0	1	0
PFC Victoria London (loan)	2016–17	Middlesex County League Division Two	1	0	—		—		1 (Note: Appearance in the Hampshire & Dorset Division Two Combination Challenge Cup)	0	2	0
GKS Tychy	2017–18	I liga	0	0	1	0	—		—		1	0
GKS Tychy	2018–19	I liga	0	0	0	0	—		—		0	0
GKS Tychy	Total		0	0	1	0	—		—		1	0
Gryf Wejherowo (loan)	2018–19	II liga	33	11	1	0	—		—		34	11
GKS Katowice	2019–20	II liga	25	10	2	0	—		—		27	10
Resovia Rzeszów	2020–21	I liga	14	0	0	0	—		—		14	0
Chalfont St Peter	2021–22	Isthmian League South Central Division	15	7	0	0	—		0	0	15	7
Marlow	2022–23	Isthmian League South Central Division	29	9	2	1	—		2 (Note: One appearance in the FA Trophy, one in the Isthmian League South Central Division play-offs)	0	33	10
Marlow	2023–24	Isthmian League South Central Division	35	34	3	0	—		4 (Note: Two appearances and two goals in the FA Trophy, two appearances and two goals in the Isthmian League South Central Division play-offs)	4	42	38
Marlow	Total		64	43	5	1	—		6	4	75	48
Walton & Hersham	2024–25	Southern League Premier Division South	38	22	2	1	—		1 (Note: Appearance in the Southern League Premier Division South play-offs)	1	41	24
Walton & Hersham	2025–26	Southern League Premier Division South	41	24	3	0	—		5 (Note: Appearances in the FA Trophy)	3	49	27
Walton & Hersham	Total		79	46	5	1	—		6	4	90	51
Dorking Wanderers	2026–27	National League South	11	8	4	1	—		0	0	15	9
Career total			246	125	18	3	0	0	13	8	277	136
