= Westfield, Woking, Surrey =

Neighbourhood of Woking, Surrey, England

Coordinates: 51.300972°N 0.560286°W

Westfield
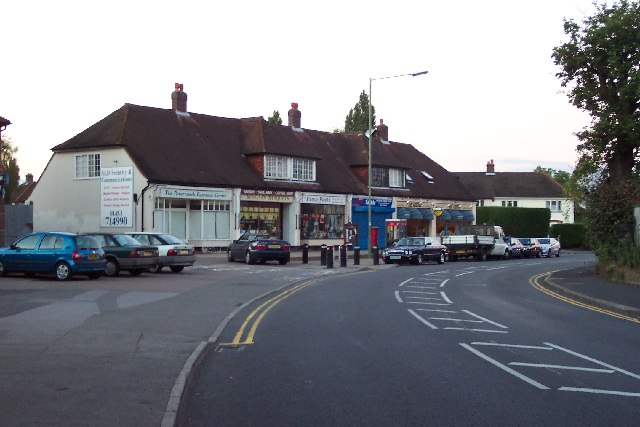
- Local shops at Westfield

- Location within Surrey
- OS grid reference: TQ004567
- District: Woking
- Shire county: Surrey
- Region: South East
- Country: England
- Sovereign state: United Kingdom
- Post town: Woking
- Postcode district: GU22
- Police: Surrey
- Fire: Surrey
- Ambulance: South East Coast
- UK Parliament: Woking

Westfield is an area in Woking borough, Surrey. Westfield marks the southern boundary of Woking altering from English archetypal suburban homes in the north to semi-rural homes, smallholdings, small woodlands and fields in the south, where it abuts areas of London's Metropolitan Green Belt.

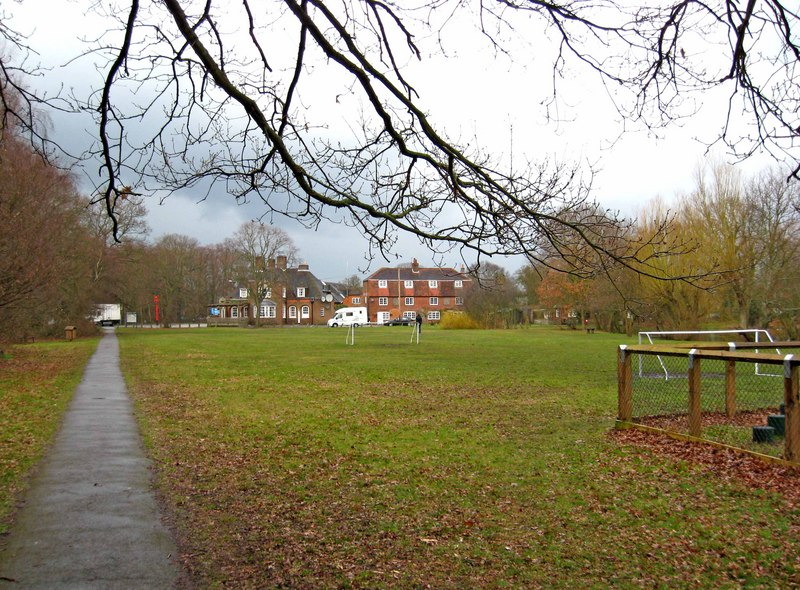
Westfield Common

== History ==
=== Pre-history ===
There is some archaeological evidence of Late Bronze Age activity in Westfield. Late Bronze Age artefacts have been recovered from this area and are now stored in the British Museum.

=== 16th century ===
Westfield was one of three ‘open fields’ of the ancient town of Woking (see Old Woking) and was first recorded in 1548. The ‘west’ field was in fact divided into two areas with the ‘lower west field’ occupying the area of present-day Westfield Avenue and the Football Ground and the ‘upper west field’ covering the area to the south and east of the Westfield Road. The Old Cricketers Inn and Cricketers Cottage on Westfield Common have a 16th-century provenance Built in the 16th century, Walnut Tree Cottage was the site of a Liquorice factory.

=== 19th century ===
As well as the ‘common fields’ Westfield had a large area of ‘common land’ that, despite being bought by the London Necropolis Company in the mid-19th century, remains open even today. The registered common land is called Westfield Common.

== Modern housing development ==
All of the 'modern development' of Westfield (as well as Kingfield and Old Woking) has been on the former fields of the area, with the bounds of many of these fields still traceable in the estate boundaries. For example:

- Rosebank Cottages occupies the property boundaries of the old Wilcox Farm. Development of this housing commenced after 1881 with evidence of housing appearing in Ordnance Survey Maps of 1896.
- The Westfield Way Estate occupies the property boundaries of the old Westfield Farm. The present form of this housing estate appearing in the Ordnance Survey Maps of 1968–71.
- Balfour Avenue - There is a large inter-war period Housing Development built around Balfour Avenue.
- Kingsmoor Park - A new housing development is being constructed on former Agricultural land south east of Westfield Common (previously referred to as the Moor Lane development).

== Facilities ==
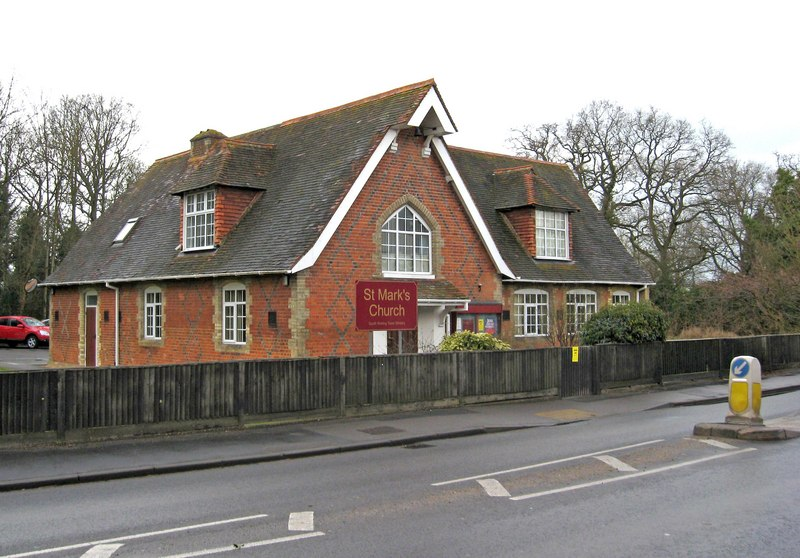
St. Mark's Church, Westfield Road

- The Church of Saint Mark - Belonging to the Diocese of Guildford and the parish of Old Woking, Saint Mark's church was built in 1922 and holds regular services. The church is also home to the local Brownies Group. The Scouts are located in Woking Park.
- Westfield Surgery - Belonging to the Southview Surgery in Woking, Westfield Surgery offers medical services to the locals of the South Woking area.
- Westfield Dental and Implant Centre - Westfield also has a Dental and Implant Centre.
- Moorcroft Centre - The Moorcroft centre is a converted school and daycare centre.
- Old Woking and District Recreation Club-Is a CIU affiliated local venue and has regular Latin/Salsa dance classes.
- The Guru Balti House-Serves Indian cuisine.
- Eastern Oriental-Mainly Serves Chinese Food.

== Schools ==
Westfield has a Primary School and Pre-School located down Bonsey Lane. There used to be a Secondary School called Highlands, though this formed with Horsell County Secondary School in Horsell to become Horsell High School, which later became Woking High School. Most local children attend either Westfield Primary School (Bonsey Lane), Send School, Barnsbury School and BDB, Woking High School and The Winston Churchill School. The younger children attend various pre-schools around the area

== Politics ==
Westfield, together with the areas of Kingfield, Shackleford Road, Old Woking & Gresham Park form the Hoe Valley electoral ward formed in 2015 which is named after the Hoe Stream a tributary of the River Wey

Prior to the boundary change Westfield together with Barnsbury & Kingfield, formed an electoral ward of Woking called Kingsfield & Westfield. The polling districts are Westfield (KB), Kingfield (KC) & Barnsbury (KA).

== Sport and leisure ==
Westfield has a Non-League football club Westfield (Surrey) F.C. who play at Woking Park.

== Gallery ==
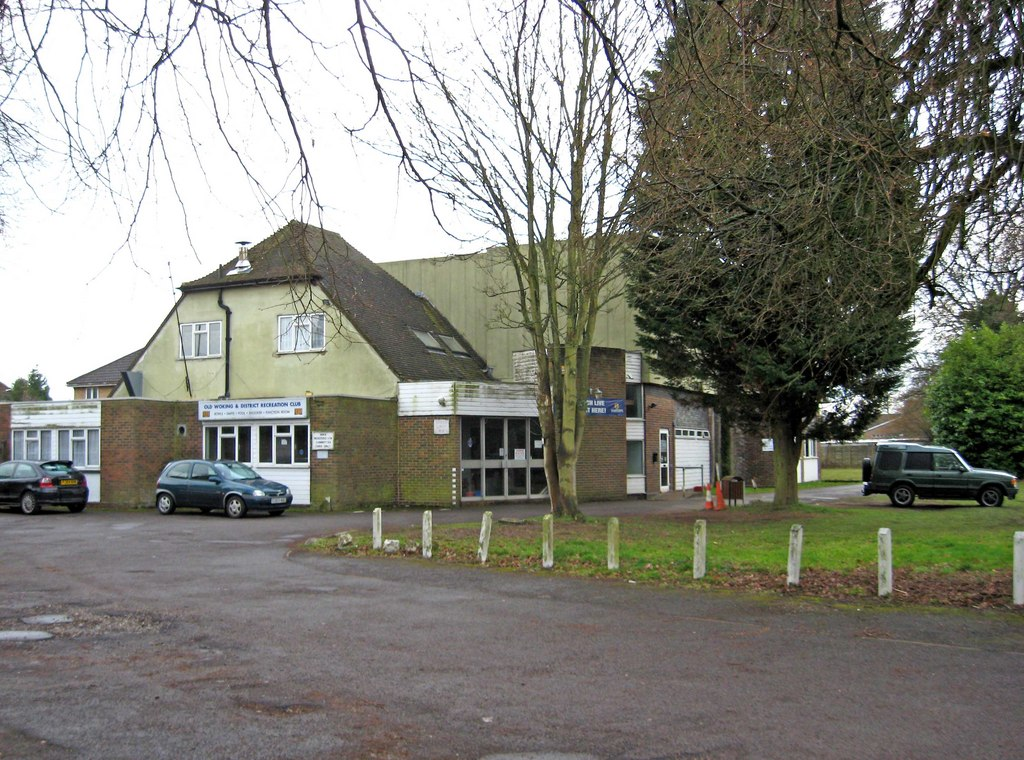
Woking District and Recreation Club

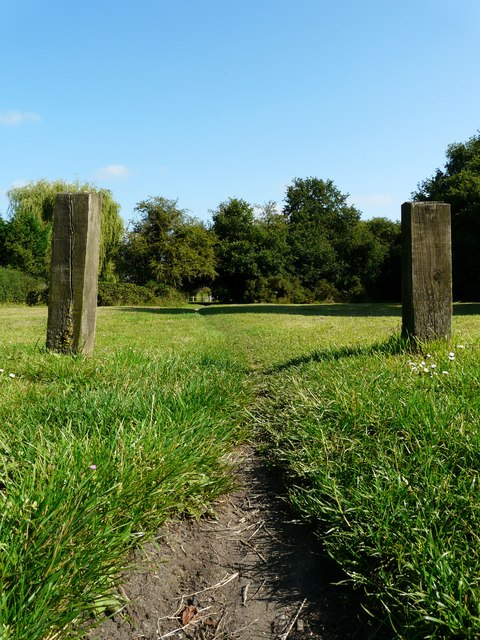
Path leading to Moor Lane

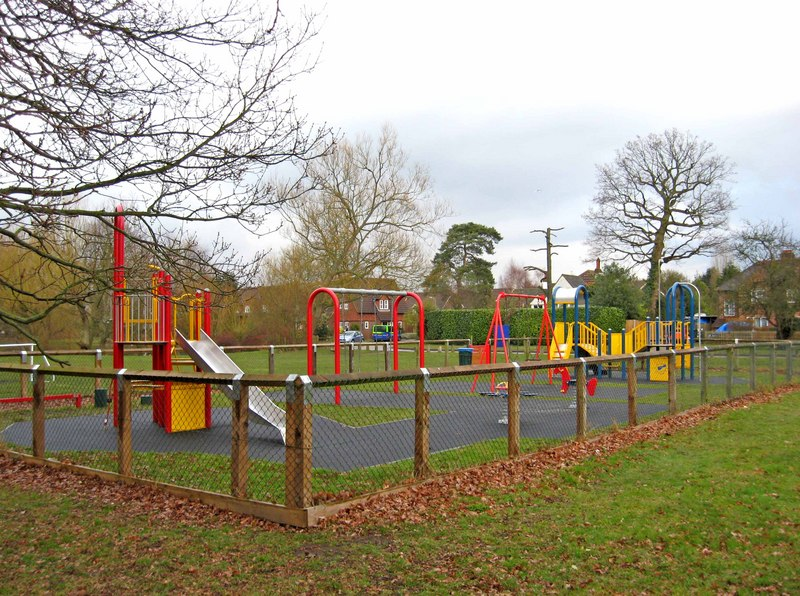
Westfield Common Play Area

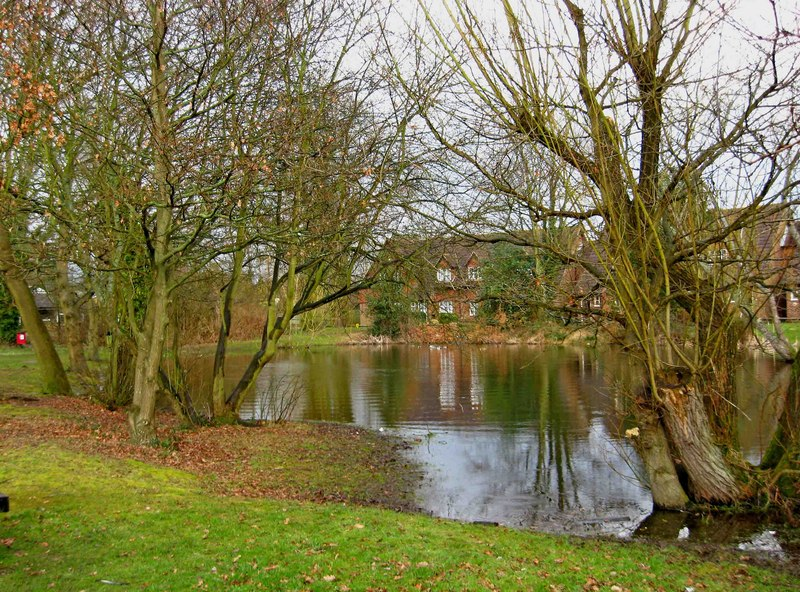
One of the Ponds on Westfield Common

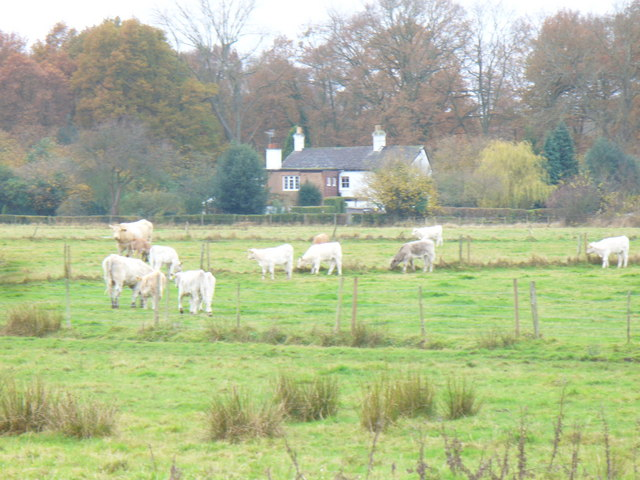
Animals on Westfield Common

== See also ==
- Old Woking, Woking
- Westfield Common, Woking
