= Dawid Jackiewicz =

Polish politician (born 1973)

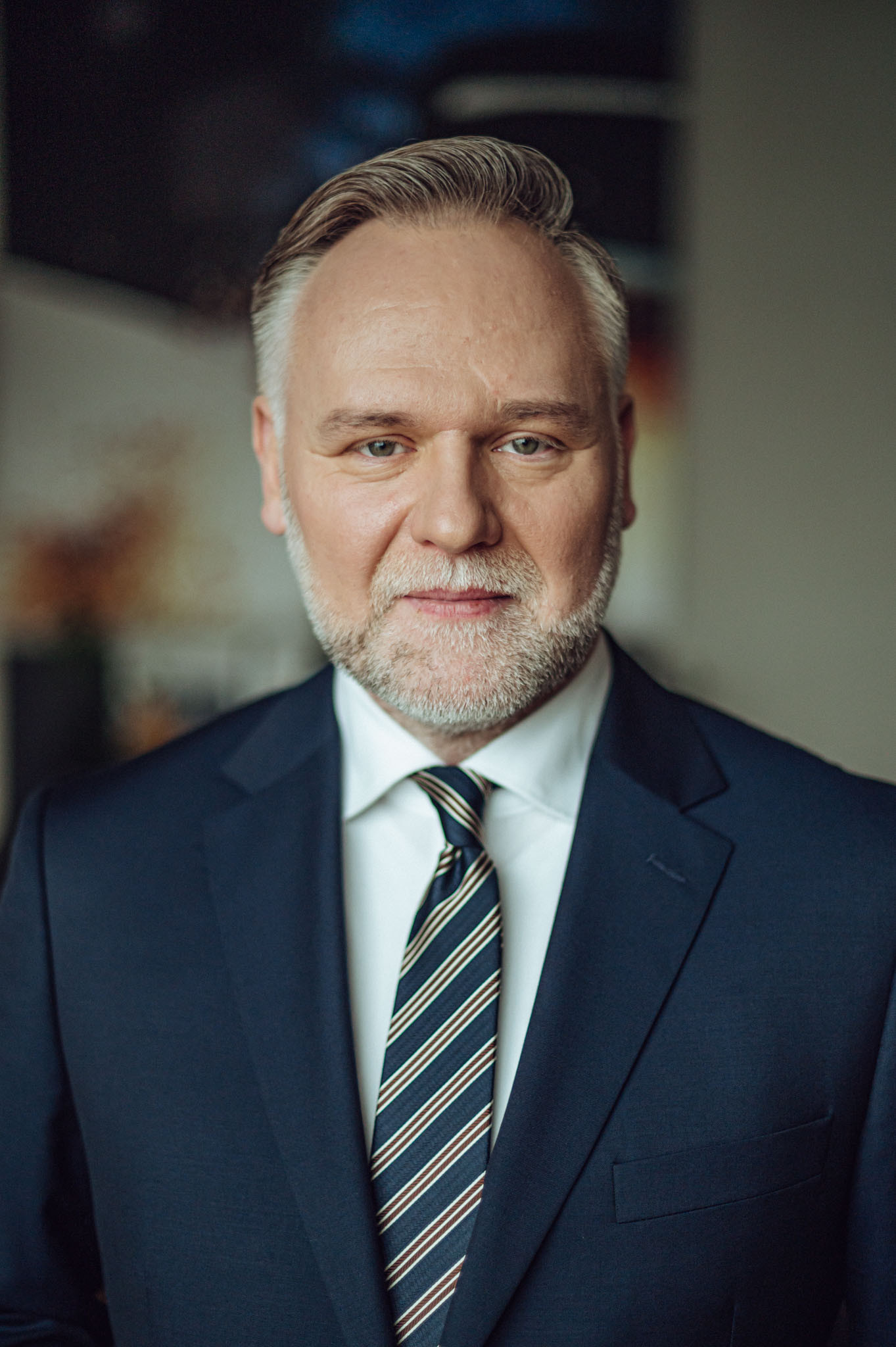
- Jackiewicz in 2023

Member of the Sejm
- In office 25 September 2005 – 11 November 2015
- Constituency: 3 – Wrocław

Personal details
- Born: 18 March 1973 (age 53) Wrocław, Poland
- Party: Law and Justice
- Spouse: Anna
- Children: 2 sons
- Education: University of Wrocław

Dawid Bohdan Jackiewicz (born 18 March 1973 in Wrocław) is a Polish politician, and the former Minister of State Treasury (2015–2016).

In 1998, he graduated with a degree in political science from the University of Wrocław.

He was elected to the Sejm, the Polish legislature, on 25 September 2005, receiving 12,362 votes in 3 Wrocław district, as a candidate on the Law and Justice party list. He was re-elected in 2007 and 2011.

In 2007, Jackiewicz held office as the Secretary of State in the Ministry of the Treasury. He was a member of the European Parliament for the Lower Silesia Province and Opolian Silesia region for the Law and Justice Party. He was elected in 2014.

He was vice-chair of the Delegation to the EU-Moldova Parliamentary Association Committee, a member of the Committee on Industry, Research and Energy (ITRE) and on the Committee on the Internal Market and Consumer Protection (IMCO).

Dawid and Anna Jackiewicz have two sons.

He declared his candidacy in the 2025 Polish presidential election, declaring the creation of the political party "Ambitious Poland" (Polish: Ambitna Polska). Despite delivering 148,804 signatures, his candidacy was rejected, as 66,168 of the signatures he delivered were invalid, bringing him under the required 100,000. He protested the rejection, demanding transparency and declaring cooperation with the National Electoral Commission and judiciary to review and accept his candidacy.

== See also ==
- Members of Polish Sejm 2005–2007
- Members of Polish Sejm 2007–2011
