= Dave FM =

Dave FM may refer to:

- CJDV-FM, a radio station in Kitchener, Ontario, Canada
- WZGC, a radio station in Atlanta, Georgia, United States
- KKDT, a radio station in Burdett, Kansas, United States
- KITS, a radio station in San Francisco, California, United States
- KMTZ, a radio station in Butte, Montana
