= Dave (artist) =

Swiss artist

David Pflugi
- Born: David Pflugi; 1969 (age 56–57); Wahlen, Switzerland
- Notable work: Le rêve du football (FIFA 1998) The Magic of Football (FIFA 2002) The Road to Berlin (FIFA 2006) Reaching for the Stars (FIFA 2010) The Seeds of Victory (FIFA 2014) DC: The Fall of Athens DC II: Hope or Hype Space of Time Formensch

David Pflugi (formerly active as Dave) is a Swiss artist whose highly unusual style of art has garnered him international attention. Notable works include the "Victory Works", five works of art he created for the FIFA football world cups of 1998, 2002, 2006, 2010 and 2014 in collaboration with FIFA, all of which were signed by the players of both finalist teams participating in each cup final.

He again received international media attention in 2009 for two performances he held at the Acropolis in Athens, Greece and at the Brandenburg Gate in Berlin, Germany. In Frankfurt, he is known as the creator of the artwork "Space of Time" which is a permanent architectural feature of the main entrance to the Commerzbank Tower.

David Pflugi's artistic style is based on the idea that one object can look completely different depending on which perspective it is viewed from. In its simplest form, this takes the form of a three-dimensional relief being painted with fragments of different two-dimensional images. Viewed from a specific position, the fragments come together to form complete images. If the observer moves, the anamorphic illusions come apart again and the image becomes abstract. A heavy emphasis is placed on the Gesamtkunstwerk aspect of the works, rather than individual images. Thus, David Pflugi's artworks, which he refers to as "fusions", often contain a large number of various artistic styles and techniques: A "fusion" can easily be a sculpture, a classical portrait, an action painting and a performance all in one.

Amongst other places, his works have been exhibited in Berlin, Basel, New York City, Frankfurt and Cannes.
