= The David (band) =

American garage/psychedelic rock band

Background information
- Origin: Los Angeles, California, United States
- Genres: Garage rock; psychedelic rock; freakbeat
- Years active: 1965–early 1970s
- Labels: 20th Century Fox; VMC Records
- Past members: Warren Hansen; Mark Bird; Mike Butte; Chuck Spieth; Tim Harrison

The David was an American garage rock/psychedelic rock band from Los Angeles, in southern California who were active in the 1960s and early 1970s. They are known for songs such as "40 Miles," which became a minor hit in Bakersfield. They began with a basic garage approach but later expanded their creative palette to incorporate esoteric and baroque elements on the 1967 album, Another Day, Another Lifetime. They continued for a few more years but disbanded in the early 1970s.

== History ==
The band was founded in Los Angeles in 1965 as the Reasons. The band's membership consisted of Warren Hansen on lead vocals and organ, who was also the band's principal songwriter, as well as Mark Bird on lead guitar, Mike Butte on rhythm guitar, Chuck Spieth on bass, Tim Harrison on drums. The group often played gigs in the Los Angeles area and their manager, Steven Vail, succeeded in getting the band signed to 20th Century Fox's record label.

They recorded two 7-inch singles for 20th Century Fox. The first of these was recorded in the fall of 1966 and released in early 1967. It featured the song, "40 Miles," which became a hit in Bakersfield California, reaching #19 on the local charts, and was backed with the B-side "Bus Token." They followed up with another 45, "People Saying, People Seeing," which came out in April. Shortly thereafter, Mike Butte departed from the group, and 20th Century Fox released them from their contract.

The band was able to secure arrangements with VMC Records (Vance Music Company) and became the first act to sign with the label. They went into the studio to record a full-length album, Another Day, Another Lifetime, which included baroque orchestration arranged by Gene Page on some of its tracks and saw the band further explore eclectic and esoteric influences in a fashion not dissimilar to the Left Banke, but retaining the harder rocking garage-based edge of their previous work. Warren Hanson wrote all of the songs on the album during the sessions and invented an instrument called the "plasmatar," which sounds similar to an electric cello and can be heard on some of tracks. The album featured songs such as the chant-like theme "Another Day, Another Lifetime," "Sweet December," "Now to You," "So Much More," and "Time M." In 1968 the band played at the Miss Teen Screen Magazine pageant held at the Hollywood Palladium and in the local TV documentary Gramophone to Groovy. Shortly thereafter they released a back-to-basics single "I'm Not Alone" b/w "Sweet December" on VMC Records. The band would continue for a few more years but broke up in the early 1970s.

Bassist Chuck Spieth, died in a house fire at the age of 21. Band leader Warren Hansen went on to become an engineer engaged in environmental issues. Former drummer Tim Harrison is a property manager in Venice, California, and Mark Bird, former lead guitarist, is a physician in Orange County, California. In the intervening years their work has come to the attention of garage rock and psychedelic collectors and enthusiasts. Two of their songs "40 Miles" and "I'm Not Alone" were re-issued in 1996 on the Pebbles, Volume 9: Southern California 2 CD, put out by Greg Shaw's AIP label. In 2001, Jamie Records re-issued their 1967 album, Another Day Another Lifetime.

== Membership ==
- Warren Hansen (vocals and organ)
- Mark Bird (lead guitar)
- Mike Butte (rhythm guitar)
- Chuck Spieth (bass)
- Tim Harrison (drums)

== Discography ==
=== Singles ===
- "40 Miles" b/w "Bus Token" (20th Century Fox 6663, 1967)
- "People Saying, People Seeing" b/w "40 Mile" (20th Century Fox 6675, April 1967)
- "I'm Not Alone" b/w "Sweet December" (VMC 716, 1968)

=== LP ===
- Another Day, Another Lifetime (VMC, 1967)
