= Jack Evans (footballer, born 1993) =

English footballer (born 1993)

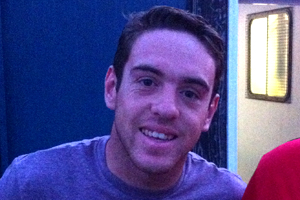
- Evans in 2013

Personal information
- Full name: Jack Peter Evans
- Date of birth: 19 March 1993 (age 33)
- Place of birth: Gravesend, England
- Height: 5 ft 10 in (1.78 m)
- Position: Midfielder

Team information
- Current team: Billericay Town

Youth career
- 2000–2011: Gillingham

Senior career*
Years	Team	Apps	(Gls)
2011–2013	Gillingham	7	(0)
2011	→ Lewes (loan)	4	(0)
2011–2012	→ Welling United (loan)	8	(0)
2012	→ Corby Town (loan)	4	(0)
2013	→ Dartford (loan)	15	(2)
2013–2014	Tamworth	37	(0)
2014–2015	Sutton United	21	(2)
2015–2016	Eastbourne Borough	46	(6)
2016–2017	Maidstone United	17	(1)
2017	→ Hastings United (loan)	12	(3)
2016–2018	→ Margate (loan)	11	(2)
2018–2019	Folkestone Invicta	11	(0)
2019–2025	Chatham Town	195	(100)
2025–	Billericay Town	31	(3)
- * Club domestic league appearances and goals as of 10:36, 27 April 2026 (UTC)

Jack Peter Evans (born 19 March 1993) is an English footballer who plays as a midfielder for Isthmian League Premier Division club Billericay Town.

== Career ==
=== Gillingham ===
Born in Gravesend, Evans joined Gillingham at the age of seven and progressed through the ranks of the youth team. He signed his first professional contract in April 2011. Evans joined Conference South side Lewes in February 2011 on a one-month loan deal, making four appearances. He made his professional debut for Gillingham on 15 October 2011 against Torquay United, as a last minute substitute for Chris Whelpdale. In December 2011, Evans joined Conference South outfit Welling United on an initial one-month loan which was later extended. Evans was offered a free transfer by Gillingham manager Martin Allen in January 2013, along with three other young professionals. Evans was loaned to Dartford for an initial one-month spell in late January. This loan spell was extended by an additional month in late February.

=== Non league ===
On 29 May 2013, it was announced that Evans had signed for Conference National side Tamworth, with the player expected to fill the void left by Richard Tait's departure to Cambridge United. Evans then joined Sutton United, and then signed for Eastbourne Borough. In the summer of 2016 Evans signed for Maidstone United, who had just won promotion to the National League. In January 2017 Evans joined Hastings United on loan.

On 17 March 2017, following his loan spell with Hastings United, Evans joined National League South side Margate. After signing for Chatham Town in 2019, he captained the club to back-to-back promotions from the Southern Counties East Premier League to the Isthmian League Premier Division.

=== Billericay Town ===
On 11 June 2025, Isthmian League Premier Division side Billericay Town announced that they had signed Evans. On 30 June, Chatham Town released a statement stating that Evans remained contracted until usual procedures had been followed, and that he had been placed on the transfer list. On 19 July, Chatham announced that the clubs had reached an agreement for Evans' transfer, for an undisclosed fee.

On 31 December 2025, Evans was attacked and hospitalised. A club fundraiser raised over £5,000 to cover Evans' loss of income and private medical costs. He made a full recovery, returning to action for Billericay in February 2026.

== Career statistics ==
As of match played 18 March 2017

Appearances and goals by club, season and competition
Club	Season	League			FA Cup		League Cup		Other		Total	
Club	Season	Division	Apps	Goals	Apps	Goals	Apps	Goals	Apps	Goals	Apps	Goals
Gillingham	2011–12	League Two	7	0	0	0	0	0	0	0	7	0
Gillingham	2012–13	League Two	0	0	0	0	0	0	1 (Note: Appearance(s) in Football League Trophy)	0	1	0
Gillingham	Total		7	0	0	0	0	0	1	0	8	0
Lewes (loan)	2010–11	Conference South	4	0	0	0	—		0	0	4	0
Welling United (loan)	2011–12	Conference South	8	0	0	0	—		0	0	8	0
Corby Town (loan)	2012–13	Conference North	4	0	0	0	—		0	0	4	0
Dartford (loan)	2012–13	Conference Premier	15	2	0	0	—		1 (Note: Appearance(s) in FA Trophy)	0	16	2
Tamworth	2013–14	Conference Premier	37	0	0	0	—		3	0	40	0
Sutton United	2014–15	Conference South	21	2	2	0	—		2	0	25	2
Eastbourne Borough	2014–15	Conference South	13	0	0	0	—		0	0	13	0
Eastbourne Borough	2015–16	National League South	33	6	3	0	—		4 (Note: Two appearances and two goals in FA Trophy, two appearances in Sussex Senior Challenge Cup)	2	40	8
Eastbourne Borough	Total		46	6	3	0	—		4	2	53	8
Maidstone United	2016–17	National League	17	1	1	0	—		2	0	20	1
Hastings United (loan)	2016–17	Isthmian League Division One South	12	3	0	0	—		0	0	12	3
Margate	2016–17	National League South	9	0	0	0	—		0	0	9	0
Margate	2017–18	Isthmian Premier Division	2	2	0	0	—		0	0	2	2
Margate	Total		11	2	0	0	0	0	0	0	11	2
Folkestone Invicta	2018–19	Isthmian Premier Division	10	1	0	0	—		0	0	11	0
Chatham Town	2019–20	SCEFL Premier Division	0	0	0	0	—		0	0	0	0
Chatham Town	2020–21	SCEFL Premier Division	0	0	0	0	—		0	0	0	0
Chatham Town	Total		0	0	0	0	0	0	0	0	0	0
Career total			192	17	6	0	0	0	13	2	212	18

== Honours ==
Chatham Town

- Isthmian League South East Division: 2022–23
