= Wépion =

Sub-municipality of the city of Namur, Belgium

- Sub-municipality of Namur
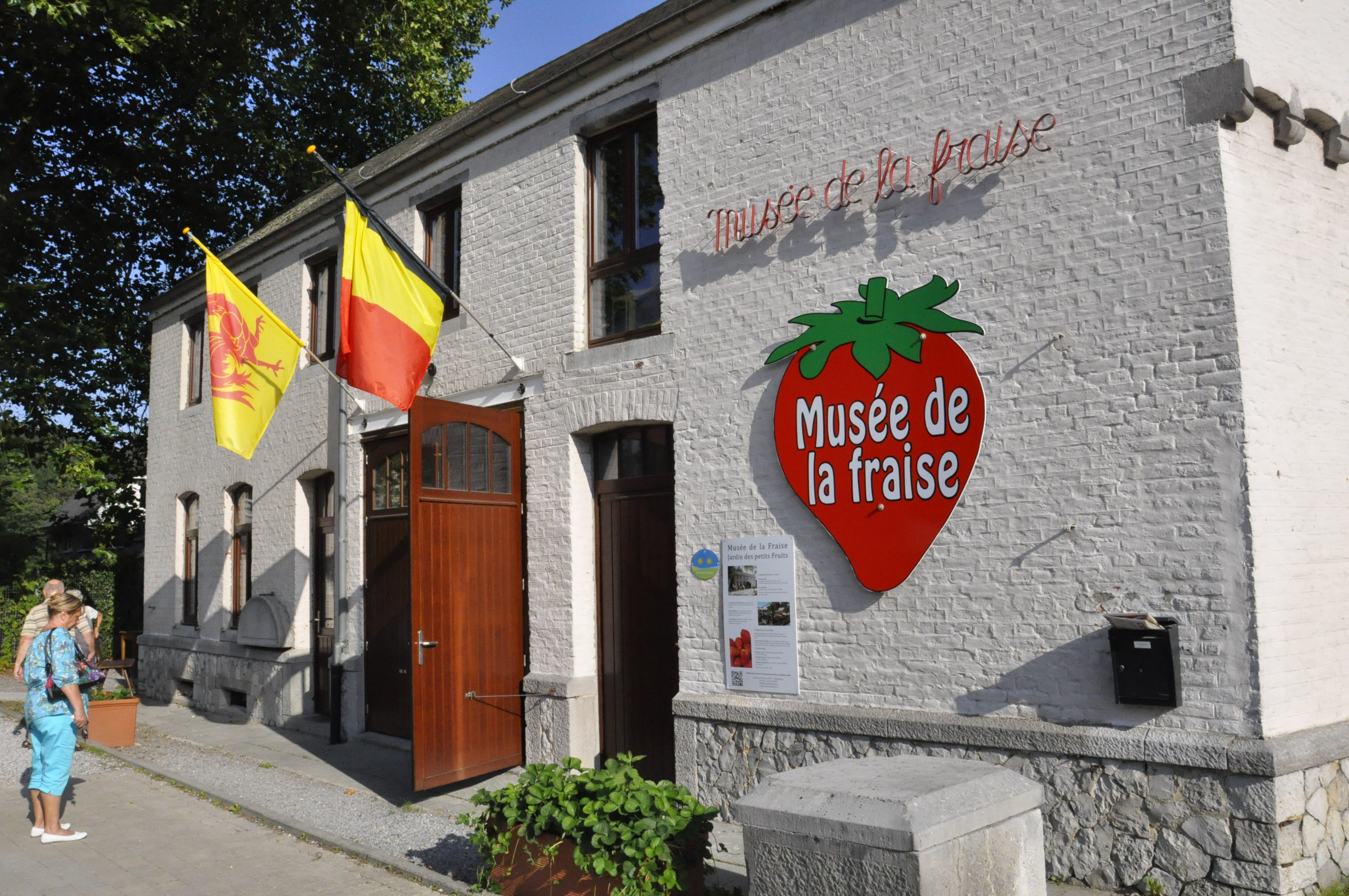
- Strawberry museum in Wépion

- Location of Wépion in Namur
- Interactive map of Wépion
- Location within Belgium Location within Namur Province
- Coordinates: 50°25′00″N 4°52′00″E
- Country: Belgium
- Community: French Community
- Region: Wallonia
- Province: Namur
- Arrondissement: Namur
- Municipality: Namur

Area
  - Total: 16.14 km^{2} (6.23 sq mi)

Population (2020-01-01)
  - Total: 6,596
  - Density: 408.7/km^{2} (1,058/sq mi)
- Postal codes: 5100
- Area codes: 081

Wépion (French pronunciation: [wepjɔ̃]) is a sub-municipality of the city of Namur located in the province of Namur, Wallonia, Belgium. It was a separate municipality until 1977. On 1 January 1977, it was merged into Namur.

Located 8 kilometres (5.0 mi) south of the city centre, it is considered as Belgian's strawberry capital, with the Wépion strawberry an established concept in Belgian cuisine. The strawberry has been cultivated there for more than 150 years because Wépion benefits from a micro-climate, sun-exposed plantations on west sloping ground and has a perfect ground for this type of culture.

It produces a strawberry beer under the brand name La Wépionnaise.

== See also ==
- Wépion strawberry
- La Pairelle
