= Léo Kret =

Brazilian politician, dancer, actress, and singer (born 1983)

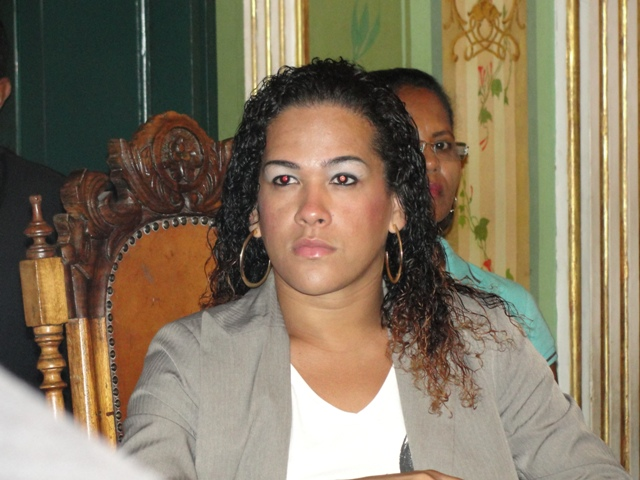
- Kret, 2012

Councilwoman of Salvador
- In office January 1, 2009 – December 31, 2012

Personal details
- Born: December 9, 1983 (age 42) Salvador, Bahia, Brazil
- Party: Party of the Republic (2008–2014); Democrats (2014–2022); Democratic Labour Party (2022–present)
- Occupation: Politician; dancer; actress; singer

Léo Kret do Brasil de Souza Santos (born December 9, 1983), better known simply as Léo Kret or Léo Kret do Brasil, is a Brazilian politician, dancer, actress, and singer. Kret was the first transgender councilwoman in the city of Salvador, Bahia.

== Biography ==
Kret was born on December 9, 1983, in Salvador, Bahia, as the child of Eunice Souza dos Santos and Francisco Assis Gomes. She was baptized at birth as Alecsandro de Souza Santos, and grew up in the Areia Branca neighborhood of Lauro de Freitas in Bahia. Later, she and her family moved to the Pernambués neighborhood of Salvador.

On November 18, 2009, Judge Nelson Cordeiro of the Civil Registry Court of Salvador granted a favorable ruling allowing Kret to use the legal name Leo Kret do Brasil. However, she continued to be referred to as Alecsandro by the Brazilian Electoral Court until 2018.

== Artistic career ==
Kret began her career as a dancer with the pagode group Saiddy Bamba before leaving the group in 2009 or 2010.

After losing re-election in 2012, Kret returned to her artistic career, starting the carioca funk music group Leo Kret & as Novinhas in 2013. Among the songs the group released was Aula de Quadradinho, which they performed with other artists such as Ivete Sangalo at the artists' shows.

In 2019, she participated in the music video for Bola Rebola by singer Anitta. She worked with Anitta again in 2020, in the music video for the song Me Gusta.

== Political career ==
Kret entered politics in the 2008 municipal elections, when she ran as a Party of the Republic candidate for the position of city councilor. She obtained 12,861 votes, the fourth highest number of votes for the legislative office in Salvador that year, and was elected and served in the 16th legislature of the Salvador City Council.

In 2010, she ran for the position of State Representative of Bahia, obtaining 22,534 votes (0.36%). Of the 22,534, 15,664 votes were in Salvador. In the 2012 elections, she ran for re-election as a city councilor. She received 7,495 votes (0.58%) and failed to be re-elected due to the electoral quotient.

In 2014, Kret changed parties and joined the Democrats. She ran for office four times for the party – in 2014 for state representative of Bahia, in 2016 and 2020 for city councilor of Salvador, and in 2018 for federal representative for Bahia – but was not elected on any of the occasions.

In December 2017 she took up the position of sectoral ombudsman at the Secretariat of Reparations (SEMUR) in Salvador. She left the position in March 2020 after being accepted to study administration and law at Bahia State University, returning in November 2022. Kret graduated from Bahia State University in 2023.

In March 2022, Léo Kret announced her departure from the Democrats to join the Democratic Labour Party (PDT). At the time, Kret was received directly by the state president of the party, Félix Mendonça Júnior, who invited her to run for the position of federal deputy. She had an unsuccessful bid for PDT federal deputy in the Chamber of Deputies in the 2022 Brazilian elections, receiving 9,012 votes. In 2024, also for the PDT, Kret ran unsuccessfully for Salvador City Council.

In April 2025, Kret became the director of policies for SEMUR. In May 2026, she was investigated for the diversion of public funds from pride parades in Salvador.
