= Dave, Namur =

Sub-municipality of the city of Namur, Belgium

Dave Dåve (Walloon)
- Sub-municipality of Namur
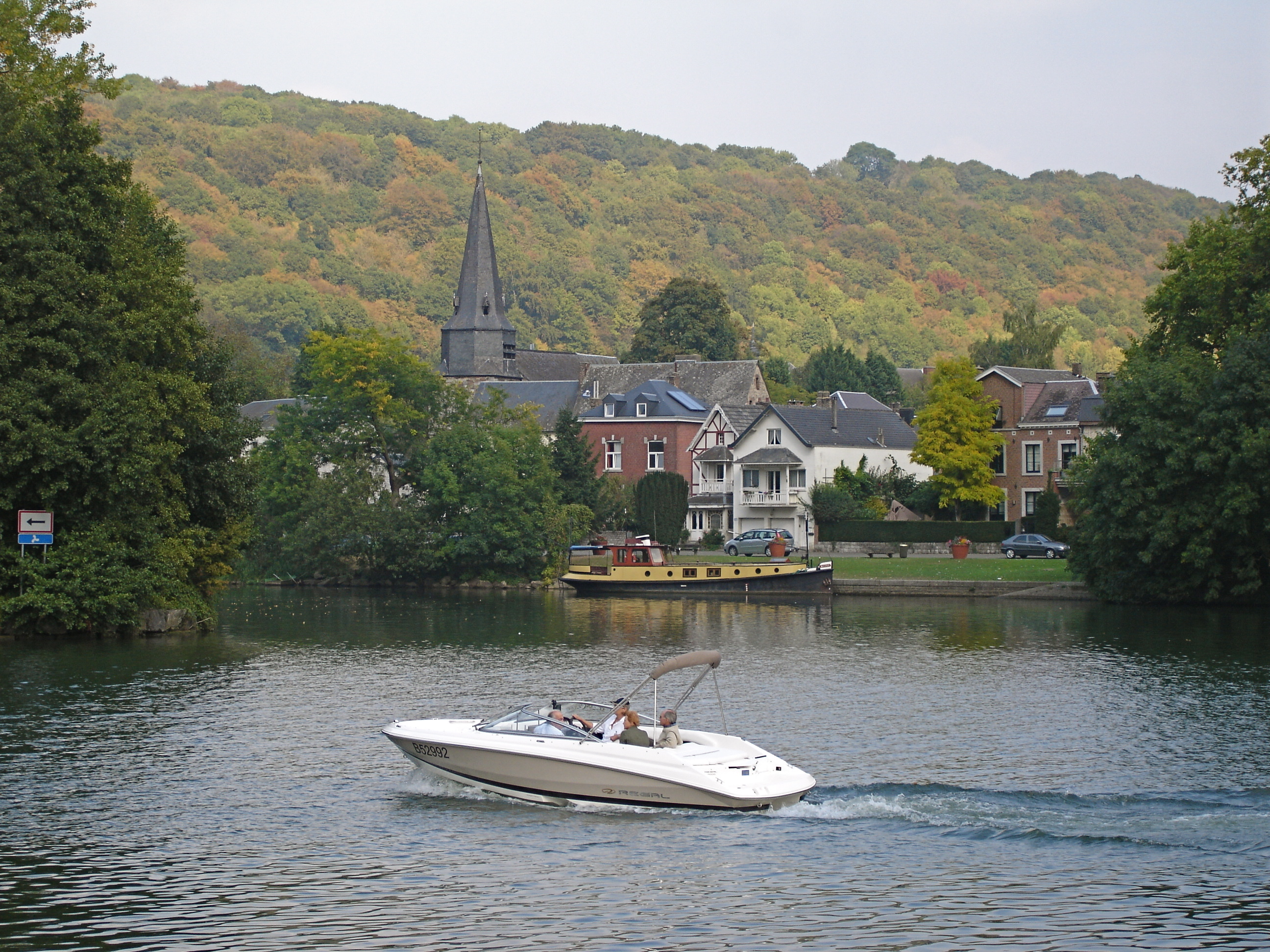

- Location of Dave in Namur
- Interactive map of Dave
- Location within Belgium Location within Namur Province
- Coordinates: 50°24′00″N 4°53′00″E
- Country: Belgium
- Community: French Community
- Region: Wallonia
- Province: Namur
- Arrondissement: Namur
- Municipality: Namur

Area
  - Total: 11.28 km^{2} (4.36 sq mi)

Population (2020-01-01)
  - Total: 1,504
  - Density: 133.3/km^{2} (345.3/sq mi)
- Postal codes: 5100
- Area codes: 081

Dave (French pronunciation: [dav]; Walloon: Dåve) is a sub-municipality of the city of Namur located in the province of Namur, Wallonia, Belgium. It was a separate municipality until 1 January 1977, when it was merged into Namur.

It is on the right bank of the Meuse, 7 km (4.3 mi) south of the city centre.

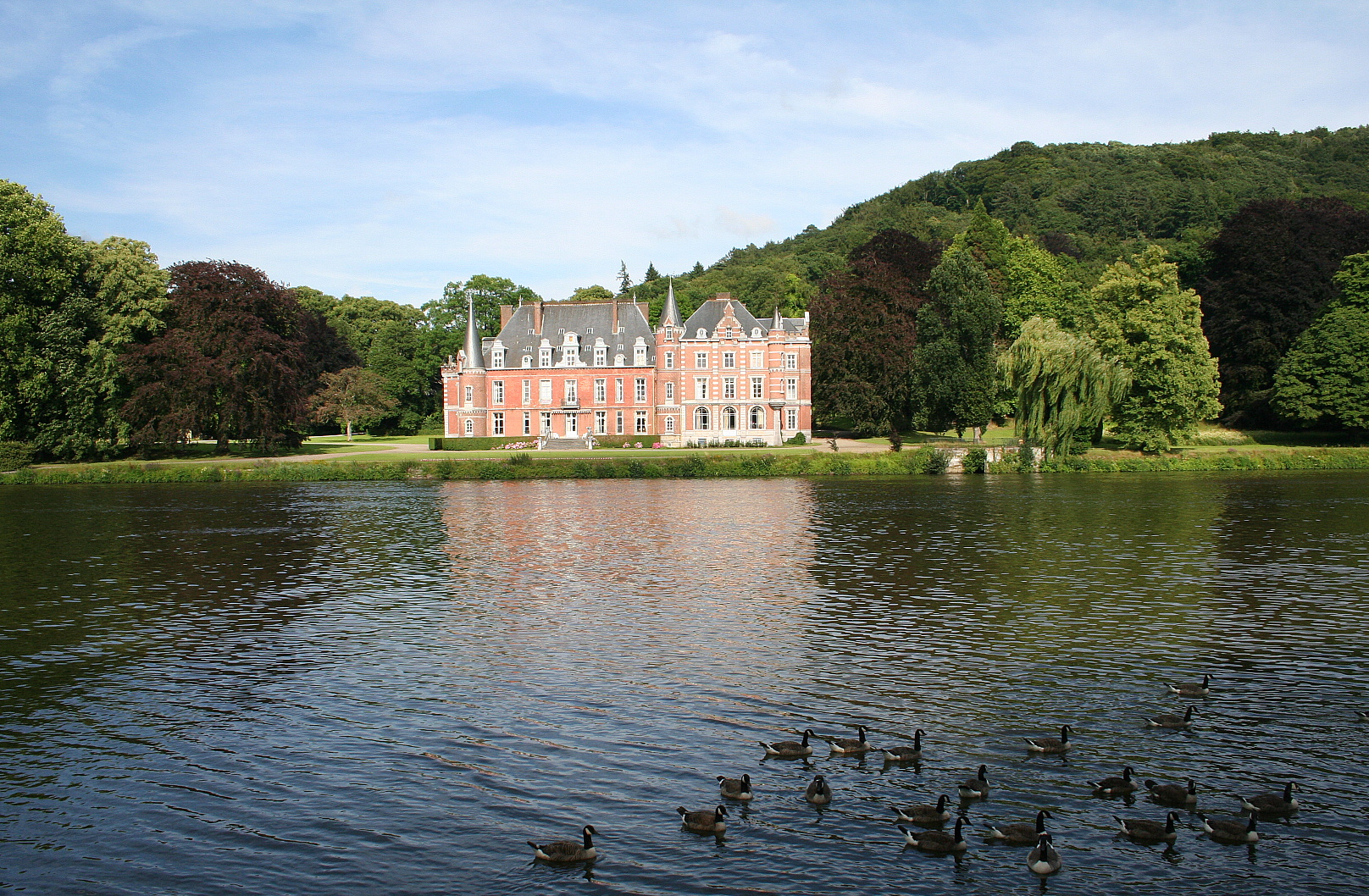
The Meuse and the 'Fernan Nunez' castle

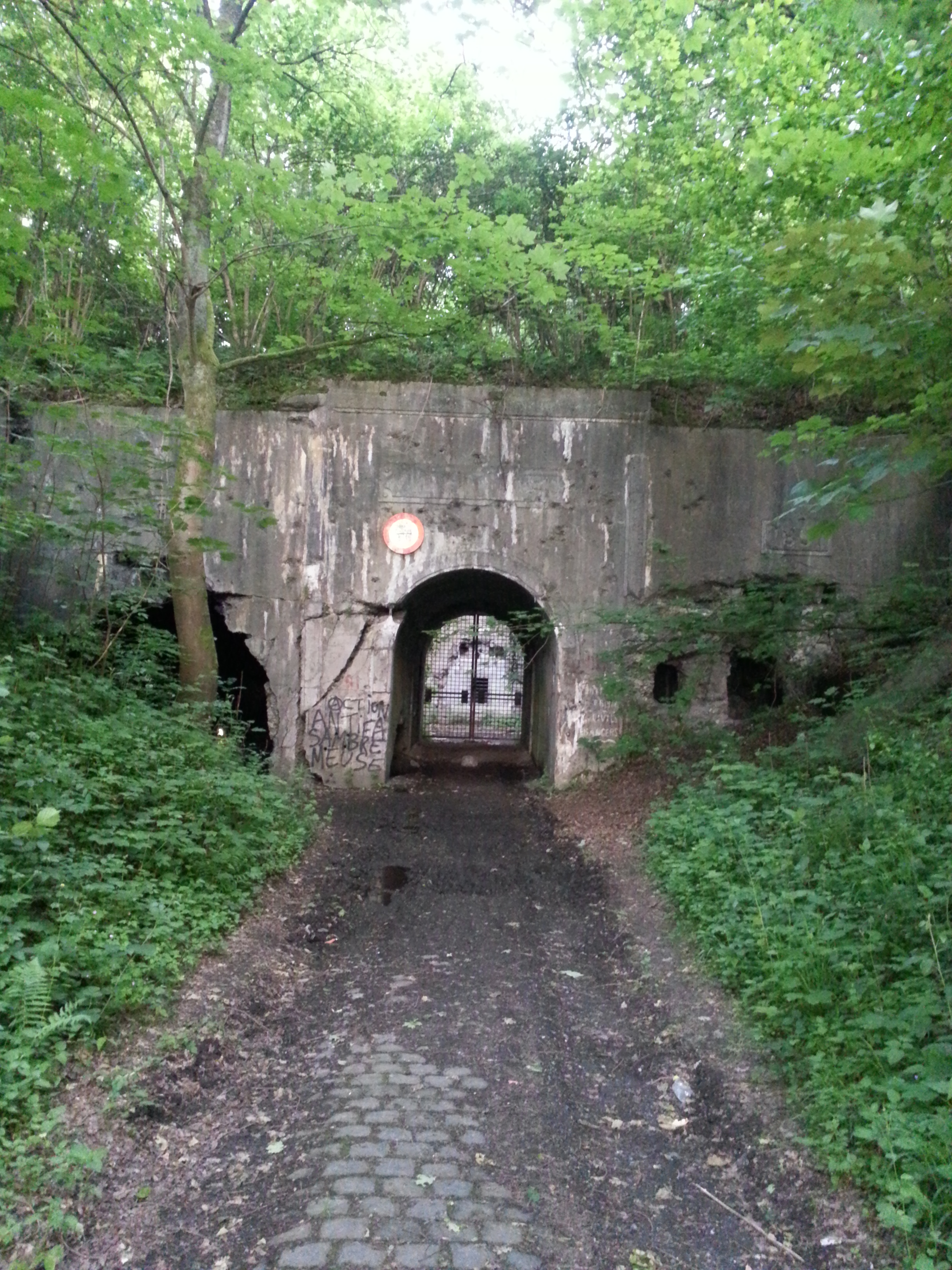
Gate to the Fort of Dave
