= Dawid Kręt =

Polish footballer

Personal information
- Date of birth: 2 August 1988 (age 38)
- Place of birth: Płońsk, Poland
- Height: 1.88 m (6 ft 2 in)
- Position: Goalkeeper

Youth career
- 2005–2006: Tęcza 34 Płońsk
- 2006–2007: Amica Wronki

Senior career*
Years	Team	Apps	(Gls)
2007–2008	Lech Poznań	0	(0)
2009	Polonia Słubice	10	(0)
2009–2010	Tur Turek	43	(0)
2011–2012	Jeziorak Iława	45	(0)
2013–2014	Motor Lubawa	31	(0)
2014–2016	Błękitni Raciąż	28+	(0)
2017	Żbik Nasielsk		
2017–2018	Świt Staroźreby		
2018–2019	GKS Gumino	17	(1)
2019–2021	Świt Staroźreby	20	(0)
- * Club domestic league appearances and goals

Dawid Kręt (born 2 August 1988) is a Polish former professional footballer who played as a goalkeeper.

== Club career ==
Dawid Kręt joined Tęcza 34 Płońsk at age 14 and spent one season there, before moving to the youth team of Amica Wronki. During the 2007–2008 season, he signed a contract with Lech Poznań.

== Honours ==
Błękitni Raciąż

- IV liga Masovia North: 2014–15
