= Davidson (name) =

Origin
- Meaning: "David's Son (or Descendant)"

Other names
- Variant form: See David (name) § Surnames

Davidson is a patronymic surname, meaning "son/descendant of David" (or "Beloved Son/Descendant"; 'David' lit. "Beloved One"). In the Highlands of Scotland, where the surname is an anglicised version of the Gaelic "mac Daibhidh", Clan Davidson was traditionally a sept of the Clan Chattan Confederation. There are alternate spellings, including those common in the British Isles and Scandinavia: Davidsen, Davisson, Davison, Daveson, Davidsson. While the given name comes from the Hebrew "David", meaning beloved, Davidson is rarely used as a masculine given name or nickname.

== Surname ==
Notable people with the surname Davidson include:

=== A–D ===
- Adam Davidson (disambiguation)
- Alan Davidson (disambiguation)
  - Alan Keith Davidson (1929–2021), Australian cricketer
  - Alan Davidson (food writer) (1924–2003), British diplomat, historian and food writer
  - Alan Davidson (Scottish footballer) (born 1960), Scottish footballer
  - Alan Douglas Davidson, Australian pilot; first Qantas death
  - Alan Edward Davidson (born 1960), Australian soccer player
- Alexander Davidson (disambiguation), several people, including:
  - Alexander Davidson (architect) (1839–1908), Scottish architect
  - Alex Davidson (Australian footballer), Australian rules footballer
  - Alex Davidson (rugby league), rugby league player
- Allan Davidson (disambiguation)
  - Scotty Davidson Allan "Scotty" Davidson (1890–1915), Canadian hockey player
- Allen Turner Davidson (1819–1905), American politician
- Amy Davidson (born 1979), American actress
- Andrew B. Davidson (1831–1902), Scottish Hebrew scholar
- Andy Davidson (disambiguation)
- Anstruther Davidson (1860–1932), Scottish-American physician and botanist
- Anthony Davidson (born 1979), British racing driver
- Arnold Davidson, American philosopher
- Arthur Davidson (disambiguation)
- Austin Quinn-Davidson (born 1979), American politician
- Avram Davidson (1923–1993), American science fiction writer
- Basil Davidson (1914–2010), English historian of Africa
- Ben Davidson (1940–2012), American football player
- Bessie Davidson (1879–1965), Australian painter
- Bill Davidson (disambiguation), several people, including:

- Bill Davidson (American football, born 1915) (1915–1970), American football player
- Bill Davidson (American football, born 1935) (1935–1999), American football player and coach
- Bill Davidson (baseball) (1884–1954), outfielder in Major League Baseball (1909–1911)
- Bill Davidson (businessman) (1923–2009), American business and professional sports executive
- Bill Davidson (rugby league) (fl. 1914–1923), New Zealand rugby league player
- Bill Davidson, (1948–2004), Canadian rock climber, known as Kayak Bill

- Bo Davidson, (born 2002), American baseball player
- Bob Davidson (ice hockey), Canadian hockey player
- Bob Davidson (umpire), baseball umpire
- Brandon Davidson, (born 1991), Canadian ice hockey player
- Bruce Davidson (equestrian), American equestrian
- Bruce Davidson (photographer) (born 1933), American photographer
- Cameron Davidson (photographer) (born 1955), American photographer
- Callum Davidson, Scottish football player and coach
- Carolyn Davidson, designed the Nike swoosh
- Charles Davidson (disambiguation), multiple people
- Charlie Davidson (born 1972), American football player
- Chris Davidson (disambiguation), multiple people
- Chy Davidson (born 1959), American football player
- Cotton Davidson (1931–2022), American football player
- David Davidson (disambiguation), several people
- Davidson (Essex cricketer), English cricketer playing 1784–1787
- Dean Davidson (born 1985), Speedway race car driver
- Della Davidson (1951–2012), American modern dancer and choreographer
- Di Davidson (born Dianne Davidson), Australian academic administrator; former Deputy Chancellor and Acting Chancellor of the University of Adelaide
- DJ Davidson (born 1997), American football player
- Donald Davidson (disambiguation), several people, including:
  - Donald Davidson (historian), British-born Indianapolis Motor Speedway historian
  - Donald Davidson (philosopher) (1917–2003), American philosopher
  - Donald Davidson (poet) (1893–1968), American poet
- Doug Davidson (born 1954), American actor
- Duncan Davidson (1941–2025), British businessman

=== E–L ===
- Eileen Davidson (born 1959), American actress
- Ella Henrietta Davidson (1851–1939), American philanthropist
- Ellis A. Davidson (1828–1878), British art writer and lecturer
- Eric H. Davidson (1937–2015), American biologist
- Ernest R. Davidson (born 1936), American chemist
- Frances Davidson, Viscountess Davidson (1894–1985), British politician
- Frankie Davidson (1934–2022), Australian singer and entertainer
- George Davidson (disambiguation), multiple people
- Gideon Davidson (born 2006), American football player
- Graeme Davidson (born 1968), Scottish footballer
- Greg Davidson (born 1970), Australian cricketer
- Greg Davidson (American football) (born 1958), American football player
- Gustav Davidson (1895–1971), American poet and angelologist
- Harold Davidson (1875–1937), English defrocked clergyman
- Harriet Miller Davidson (1839–1883), Scottish-Australian novelist
- Brigadier General Henry Brevard Davidson (1831–1899), American Civil War, Confederate Army
- Hilda Ellis Davidson (1914–2006), English antiquarian and mythographer
- Hollie Davidson (born 1992), Scottish rugby union referee
- Hugh Davidson (disambiguation)
- Ian Davidson (British politician) (born 1950), Scottish politician
- Inger Davidson (born 1944), Swedish politician
- I. Irving Davidson, American arms dealer, political middleman and lobbyist
- Jack Davidson (1875–1952), Australian rules footballer
- Jack Davidson (Scottish footballer) (born 1925), Scottish footballer (East Fife FC)
- James Dale Davidson, American founder of the National Taxpayers Union
- James Davidson (disambiguation)
- James Edward Davidson Australian founder of News Limited
- Jane Davidson (born 1957), Welsh politician
- Jared Davidson (born 2002), Canadian ice hockey player
- Jaye Davidson (born 1968), British actor
- Jazzy Davidson (born 2006), American basketball player
- Jim Davidson (disambiguation), several people, including:
  - Jim Davidson (born 1953), English comedian
- Jo Davidson, American sculptor
- John Andrew Davidson (1852–1903), Canadian politician
- John Davidson (disambiguation), several people, including:
  - John Davidson (entertainer) (born 1941), American actor, host of the game show Hollywood Squares
  - John Davidson (ice hockey) (1912–1996), a retired Canadian professional ice hockey player
  - John Davidson (poet) (1857–1909), Scottish poet and playwright
  - John Davidson, 1st Viscount Davidson, earlier known as John Colin Campbell Davidson,(1889–1970), British politician
    - John Ogilvie Davidson, Canadian packer, guide and rancher, known as "Skook" Davidson
  - Major General John Davidson (general) John "Black Jack" Davidson (1825–1881), Mexican–American War
- Jonathan Davidson, British civil engineer and soldier
- Kevin Davidson (born 1997), American football player
- Lauren Davidson (born 2001), Scottish footballer
- Leslie Davidson (1850–1915), Scottish cricketer and soldier
- Lionel Davidson (1922–2009), English novelist
- Logan Davidson (born 1997), American baseball player

=== M–R ===
- Majel Davidson (1885–1969), Scottish artist
- Margaret Davidson (suffragist) (1879–1978), Scottish suffragist, teacher and WW1 nurse
- Dame Margaret Davidson (1871–1964), British wife of colonial governor of New South Wales, Australia
- Margaret A. Davidson (1950–2017), American lawyer and coastal science pioneer
- Marlon Davidson (born 1998), American football player
- Marie Davidson (born 1987), French-Canadian electronic musician
- Mary Davidson (disambiguation)
- Matthew Davidson (disambiguation)
- Max Davidson (1875–1950), German-born film comedian
- Melody Davidson, Canadian hockey coach
- Michael Davidson (poet) (born 1944), American poet
- Michael Davidson (singer) (born 1969), singer and songwriter
- Mike Davidson (politician), New Zealand member of parliament
- Mike Davidson (swimmer) (born 1963), New Zealand freestyle swimmer
- Murray Davidson, Scottish football player
- Neil Davidson, Baron Davidson of Glen Clova, Scottish lawyer
- Nora Fontaine Davidson (1836–1929), American teacher
- Norman Davidson (biochemist) (1911–1972), Scottish biochemist and molecular biologist.
- Ogunlade Davidson, Sierra Leonean academic
- Osha Gray Davidson (born 1954), American writer
- Owen Davidson (1943–2023), Australian tennis player
- Patricia Davidson (Canadian politician) (born 1946), Canadian politician
- Paul Davidson (disambiguation)
- Penina Davidson (born 1995), New Zealand basketball player
- Pete Davidson (born 1993), American stand-up comedian
- Philip Davidson (1882–unknown), American gangster
- Phillip Davidson (1915–1996), American lieutenant-general
- Randall Davidson (1848–1930), 1st Baron Davidson of Lambeth, Archbishop of Canterbury
- Richard Davidson (born 1951), American scientist
- Richard K. Davidson (1942–2026), American railway executive
- Richard M. Davidson (actor) (born 1940), Canadian-American actor and audiobook narrator
- Richard M. Davidson (theologian), Old Testament scholar
- Robert Davidson (disambiguation)
- Robyn Davidson (born 1950), Australian writer
- Rollo Davidson (1944–1970), mathematician
- Ronald C. Davidson (1941–2016), physicist
- Ross Davidson (1949–2006), British actor
- Ross Davidson (footballer, born 1973), English footballer
- Ross Davidson (footballer, born 1989), English footballer
- Ross Davidson (footballer, born 1993), Scottish footballer

=== S–Z ===
- Samuel Davidson (1807–1898), Irish Biblical scholar
- Samuel Cleland Davidson (1846–1921), Irish inventor and founder of the Belfast Sirocco Works
- Shanice Davidson (born 2000), British trampoline gymnast
- Stewart Davidson (1886–1960), Scottish football player and coach
- Stuart Davidson (cricketer) (born 1972), Scottish cricketer
- Susan B. Davidson, American computer scientist
- Sven Davidson (1928–2008), Swedish tennis player
- Thomas Davidson (palaeontologist) (1817–1885), Scottish-British palaeontologist
- Thomas Davidson (philosopher) (1840–1900), Scottish philosopher
- Tierna Davidson (born 1998), American soccer player
- Tommy Davidson (born 1963), American actor
- Thomas Randall Davidson (1747–1827), Church of Scotland minister
- True Davidson (1901–1978), Canadian mayor
- Tucker Davidson (born 1996), American baseball player
- W. K. Davidson (1904–1974), American politician and businessma
- Warren Davidson (born 1970), American politician from Ohio
- Walter Edward Davidson (1859–1923), Colonial governor of the Seychelles, Newfoundland, New South Wales
- Walter Davidson Sr. (one of the founders of the Harley-Davidson motorcycle company)
- Will Davidson, UK footballer active in the 1890s
- William Davidson (disambiguation), several people, including:

- William Davidson (bishop) (1919–2006), bishop of the Episcopal Diocese of Western Kansas
- Bill Davidson (businessman) (1922–2009), Michigan businessman and sports team owner

- William Davidson Institute, University of Michigan, named in honor of Bill Davidson

- William Davidson (British Columbia politician) (fl. 1867–1907), Scottish-born miner and political figure
- William Davidson (congressman) (1778–1857), member of the United States House of Representatives from North Carolina
- William Davidson (conspirator) (1781–1820), African Caribbean revolutionary
- William Davidson (engineer) (1844–1920), Australian civil engineer
- William Davidson (filmmaker) (1928–2009), Canadian filmmaker and TV creator
- William Davidson (lumberman) (1740–1790), Scottish settler in Canada
- William Davidson (MCC cricketer) (1811–1894), English cricketer
- William Davidson (Pennsylvania representative) (1783–1867), Pennsylvania politician
- William Davidson (sailor) (1876–1939), British competition sailor
- William Davidson (Sussex cricketer) (1920–2015), English cricketer
- Sir William Davidson of Curriehill (1614/15–c. 1689), Scottish merchant and member of the Privy council
- William Davidson Bissett (1893–1971), Scottish recipient of the Victoria Cross
- William A. Davidson, one of the founders of the Harley-Davidson motorcycle company
- William B. Davidson (1888–1947), American actor
- William H. Davidson (lieutenant governor) (fl. 1836–1838), Lieutenant Governor of Illinois
- William H. Davidson (motorcyclist) (1905–1992), American motorcycle racer and president of Harley-Davidson Motorcycles
- Brigadier General William Lee Davidson (1746–1781), United States War of Independence, namesake of Davidson College
- William Leslie Davidson (1848–1929), Scottish philosopher
- William Mackay Davidson (1909–1991), Scottish haematologist and pathologist
- William McCartney Davidson (1872–1942), Canadian journalist, politician, and author
- William Soltau Davidson (1846–1924), New Zealander, pioneer of refrigerated shipping
- William Taylor Davidson (1837–1915), owner and editor of the Fulton Democrat newspaper

- Willie G. Davidson (William Godfrey Davidson, born 1933), designer of the Harley-Davidson Super Glide
- Zach Davidson (born 1998), American football player

== Given name ==
- Davidson Black (1884–1934), Canadian paleoanthropologist
- Davidson (footballer) (born 1991), full name Davidson da Luz Pereira, Brazilian footballer

== Fictional characters ==
- Dr. Ben Davidson, fictional character on the ABC soap opera One Life to Live, portrayed by actor Mark Derwin
- PC Andy Davidson, fictional character on the BBC science fiction series Torchwood, portrayed by actor Tom Price
- Charlene "Charley" Davidson

== See also ==
- Davidson (disambiguation)
- Viscount Davidson
- Clan Davidson
- Davison (disambiguation)
- Davidsen (disambiguation)
