= Davison (surname) =

- Pronunciation: \d(a)-vi-son\
- Language: English

Origin
- Meaning: "son of Davie (beloved one)" (patronymic)
- Region of origin: Scotland, England, Ulster

Other names
- Variant form: See David (name) § Surnames

Davison is a patronymic surname, a contraction of Davidson, meaning "son of Davie (the pet form of David)". There are alternate spellings, including those common in the British Isles and Scandinavia: Davisson, Daveson, Davidsson, and Davidsen. The Davison surname in Scotland originated as a sept of Clan Davidson, a part of the greater Clan Chattan. Davison can also be found as a common as a French, Jewish, or Czech surname.

== Notable people with the surname ==
- Aidan Davison (born 1968), Northern Ireland footballer
- Alex Davison (born 1979), Australian racing driver
- Alexander Davison (1750–1829), British businessman, Nelson's prize agent
- Archibald Thompson Davison (1883–1961), American musicologist and educator
- Bennett Davison (born 1975), American basketball player
- Boris Davison (1908–1961), mathematical physicist
- Brian Davison (cricketer) (born 1946), Rhodesian-born cricketer and politician
- Brian Davison (drummer) (1942–2008), British musician
- Bruce Davison (born 1946), American actor
- Bryce Davison (born 1986), Canadian figure skater
- Carlin Davison (born 2003), New Zealand basketball player
- Christopher Davison (born 1948), birth name of British-Irish musician Chris de Burgh
- Dehenna Davison, British politician
- Edward Davison (poet) (1898–1970), British poet
- Emily Davison (1872–1913), British suffragette
- Frederick Trubee Davison (1896–1976), American CIA Director of Personnel, son of Henry P. Davison
- George Davison (photographer) (1854–1930), British photographer and business executive
- Gerald Davison (born 1943), British author, lecturer and Asian art specialist
- Gerald Davison (born 1939), American psychologist
- Hannah Davison (born 1997), American professional basketball player
- Henry P. Davison (1867–1922), American banker, founding father of the League of Red Cross societies
- Hiram Franklin Davison (1894–1974), Canadian-born World War I flying ace
- James Davison (disambiguation), several people
- JD Davison (born 2002), American basketball player
- John Davison (disambiguation), several people
- John Biggs-Davison (1918–1988), British politician
- Joseph Davison (1868–1948), Northern Irish politician
- Kyle Davison (fl. 2010s–present), American politician from North Dakota
- Lex Davison (1923–1965), Australian Grand Prix winner; grandfather of Alex Davison, Will Davison and James Davison
- Liam Davison (1957–2014), Australian author
- Mark Davison (born 1983), British composer (professionally known as Benson Taylor)
- Mathew Davison (1839–1918), American politician
- Mike Davison (politician) (born 1950), Canadian politician
- Mike Davison (baseball) (1945–2013), American baseball player
- Monkhouse Davison (1713–1793), British merchant (grocer)
- Nicola Davison, Canadian writer
- Paul Davison (born 1971), English professional snooker player
- Peter Davison (born 1951), British actor
- Peter Davison (poet) (1928–2004), American poet, son of Edward Davison
- Randy Davison (born 1971), American actor
- Rob Davison (born 1980), Canadian hockey player
- Robert Davison (disambiguation), several people
- Roderic H. Davison (1917–1966), American historian of the Middle East
- Ronald Davison (1920–2015), New Zealand judge
- Rosanna Davison (born 1984), Irish model, crowned Miss World 2003
- Savi Davison (born 1999), Canadian-Filipino volleyball player
- Teddy Davison (1887–1971), English footballer and manager
- Thomas Davison (1794–1826), British journalist and printer
- Wild Bill Davison (1906–1989), American jazz cornet player
- Will Davison (born 1982), Australian racing driver
- William Davison (disambiguation), several people named William or Will Davison
- Zoe Davison (1960–2021), British racehorse trainer

== See also ==
- Davis (disambiguation)
- Davison (disambiguation)
- Davidsen (disambiguation)
