= William Davidson =

William or Bill Davidson may refer to:

== Businessmen ==
- Bill Davidson (businessman) (1922–2009), Michigan businessman and sports team owner
  - William Davidson Institute, University of Michigan, named in honor of Bill Davidson
- William Davidson (lumberman) (1740–1790), Scots-Canadian pioneer

== Politics ==
- Sir William Davidson of Curriehill (1614/15–c. 1689), Scottish merchant and member of the Privy council
- William Davidson (congressman) (1778–1857), member of the United States House of Representatives from North Carolina
- William Davidson (Pennsylvania politician) (1783–1867), Pennsylvania politician
- William Davidson (conspirator) (1781–1820), Jamaican-born British radical executed for his part in the Cato Street Conspiracy
- William McCartney Davidson (1872–1942), Canadian journalist, politician, and author
- William H. Davidson (Illinois politician) (fl. 1836–1838), lieutenant governor of Illinois
- William Davidson (Illinois politician), 18th century Illinois state representative
- William Davidson (British Columbia politician) (fl. 1867–1907), Scottish-born miner and political figure in British Columbia

== Engineering ==
- William Davidson (engineer) (1844–1920), Australian civil engineer
- William Davidson (agribusinessman) (1846–1924), New Zealander, pioneer of refrigerated shipping

=== Harley-Davidson ===
- William A. Davidson, executive at Harley-Davidson Motor Company, brother of co-founders Arthur and Walter Davidson, and grandfather of Willie G. Davidson
- William H. Davidson (motorcyclist) (1905–1992), American motorcycle racer and president of Harley-Davidson Motorcycles
- Willie G. Davidson (William Godfrey Davidson, born 1933), former styling chief of Harley-Davidson and designer of the Harley-Davidson Super Glide

== Military ==
- William Lee Davidson (1746–1781), American Revolutionary War officer, namesake of Davidson College
- William Davidson Bissett (1893–1971), Scottish recipient of the Victoria Cross

== Sports ==
- Bill Davidson (American football, born 1915) (1915–1970), American football player
- Bill Davidson (American football, born 1935) (1935–1999), American football player and coach
- Bill Davidson (baseball) (1884–1954), outfielder in Major League Baseball (1909–1911)
- Bill Davidson (rugby league) (fl. 1914–1923), New Zealand rugby league player
- Will Davidson, UK footballer active in the 1890s
- William Davidson (sailor) (1876–1939), British competition sailor
- William Davidson (Scottish footballer) (fl. 1904–1914), Scottish footballer with Falkirk, Everton, etc.
- William Davidson (cricketer, born 1920) (1920–2015), English cricketer
- William Davidson (cricketer, born 1811) (1811–1894), English cricketer
- Kayak Bill (Bill Davidson, 1948–2004), Canadian rock climber

== Others ==
- William Davidson (bishop) (1919–2006), bishop of the Episcopal Diocese of Western Kansas
- William B. Davidson (1888–1947), American actor
- William Mackay Davidson (1909–1991), Scottish haematologist and pathologist
- William Davidson (filmmaker) (1928–2009), Canadian filmmaker and TV creator
- William Leslie Davidson (1848–1929), Scottish philosopher
- William Taylor Davidson (1837–1915), owner and editor of the Fulton Democrat newspaper
- William Montgomery Davenport Davidson, Australian surveyor
- William Norman Lascelles Davidson (c. 1871–1935), English cinematographer
- William Davidson (landscape gardener) (fl. 1860s), designer of Old Ipswich Cemetery

== See also ==
- William Davison (disambiguation)
