= Alexander Davidson =

Alexander Davidson may refer to:

- Alex Davidson (Australian footballer) (1876–1951), Australian rules football player
- Alex Davidson (footballer, born 1920) (1920–2005), Scottish footballer
- Alex Davidson (footballer, born 1878) (1878–1929), Scottish footballer
- Alex Davidson (rugby league) (born 1992), English rugby league player
- Alexander C. Davidson (1826–1897), U.S. Representative from Alabama
- Alexander Davidson (architect) (1839–1908), Scottish architect
- Alexander Dyce Davidson, Church of Scotland minister
- Alexander Dyce Davidson (professor) (1835–1886), Scottish academic and surgeon

== See also ==
- Alexander Davison (disambiguation)
