= Jimmie Elkins =

Australian jazz bandleader (1902–1971)

- Born: 1 January 1902; Sydney, Australia
- Died: 13 November 1971 (aged 69)
- Occupation: Musician
- Years active: 1918–1928

James Warren "Jimmie" Elkins (1 January 1902 – 13 November 1971) was an Australian pianist, bandleader, and architect. He was as an influential figure in Australian jazz during the 1920s, with his orchestra being described as "the best jazz band in [Australia]" before it disbanded.

== Early life ==
Elkins was born in Sydney, Australia to Henry Samuel Elkins and Ada Sophia Elkins. He learned piano as a child and, by the age of 16, was performing piano for silent films in Sydney's suburbs and at the Sydney Haymarket Theatre.

== Career ==
=== Early musical career ===
In the early 1920s, Elkins began leading ensembles, including a residency at the Regent Palais de Danse in Cremorne. By 1924, he led a band on the Hoyts circuit of theatres in Melbourne and subsequently rose to prominence in the Sydney music scene.

=== The Jimmie Elkins Orchestra ===
Between 1925 and 1928, the Jimmie Elkins Orchestra emerged as one of Australia's leading jazz ensembles. The band opened the Coogee Casino in September 1925 and, during 1926, had its performances at the Dungowan Restaurant broadcast over radio station 2BL. On 13 October 1926, his orchestra made the first electrical recordings pressed for commercial release in Australia at the Columbia Graphophone factory in Homebush. These sessions produced the tracks "Talking to the Moon" and "When the Red, Red Robin Comes Bob, Bob, Bobbin' Along".

Throughout 1927 and 1928 the band played as Jimmie Elkins and his Wintergarden Orchestra as part of a residence at the Wentworth Hotel in Sydney. This period represented the zenith of its success, with the American magazine Variety describing Elkins as having "the best jazz band in [Australia] at the present" in April 1927.

=== Architectural practice ===
Elkins disbanded his band in October 1928 After concluding the Wentworth Hotel residency, going on to complete architecture studies at the University of Sydney.

== Legacy ==
The Jimmie Elkins Orchestra served as an incubator for a new generation of jazz musicians, including Jim Davidson and Jim Gussey. After it was disbanded, many of Elkins' sidemen were recruited into the Jack Woods’ Orchestra at the Ambassadors Restaurant. Davidson subsequently recruited a number of former Elkins players to form the Jim Davidson ABC Dance Band, which went on to become one of the most popular jazz bands in the country.

The JW and BK Elkins Architectural Award at the University of Sydney was established in 1972 after a gift from James' wife.
