= James Davidson =

James Davidson may refer to:

== Politicians ==
- James Davidson (Canadian politician) (1856–1913), mayor of Ottawa in 1901
- James Davidson (Kentucky politician) (died 1860), Kentucky pioneer and politician
- James Davidson (Oregon politician), member of the Oregon Territorial Legislature, 1851
- James Davidson (British politician) (1927–2017), Member of the Parliament of the United Kingdom
- James O. Davidson (1854–1922), governor of the U.S. state of Wisconsin, 1906–1911
- James S. Davidson, state legislator in Louisiana
- James H. Davidson (1858–1918), U.S. representative from Wisconsin
- James J. Davidson (1861–1897), American politician and businessman
- James Ironside Davidson (1818–1902), Scottish-born farmer and political figure in Ontario, Canada

== Sportspeople ==
- James Davidson (American football) (born 1990), American football player
- James Davidson (rugby union) (1868–1945), English rugby union international
- James Davidson (tennis) (born 1973), British tennis player

== Others ==
- James Davidson (historian) (born 1964), professor of Ancient Greek history
- James Dale Davidson, founder of the National Taxpayers Union in the United States
- James Davidson (ornithologist) (1849–1925), ornithologist in India
- James Alfred Davidson (1921–2004), British naval commander and diplomat
- James Edward Davidson (1870–1930), Australian journalist and newspaper owner
- James Davidson (antiquarian) (1793–1864), English local historian and bibliographer
- James W. Davidson (1872–1933), explorer, writer, United States diplomat, businessman and philanthropist
- James Wightman Davidson (1915–1973), New Zealand historian, constitutional adviser and university professor
- James Wood Davidson (1829–1905), United States author
- Norman Davidson (biochemist) (James Norman Davidson, 1911–1972), Scottish biochemist, molecular biologist and textbook author
- James Davidson (Scottish architect) (1848–1923), Scottish architect
- James Davidson (priest) (died 1933), Archdeacon of Bermuda
- James Hutchinson Davidson (1902–1982), Australian bandleader commonly known as Jim Davidson

== See also ==
- James Davidson Geddes (died 1895), politician
- Jim Davidson (disambiguation)
- Jimmy Davidson (disambiguation)
- James Davison (disambiguation)
