= Andrew Davison =

Andrew Davison may refer to:

- Andrew Davison (politician) (1886–1963), Canadian politician
- Andrew Davison (judge) (1800–1871), justice of the Indiana Supreme Court
- Andrew Davison (theologian) (born 1974), British Anglican Christian theologian
- Andrew Davison (American football) (1979–2017), American football cornerback
- Andrew Jackson Davison (1847–1922), first African-American attorney in Athens County, Ohio

== See also ==
- Andrew Davidson (disambiguation)
