= Andrew Davidson =

Andrew Davidson may refer to:

- Andrew Davidson (Army surgeon) (1819–1901), American soldier in the American Civil War
- Andrew B. Davidson (1831–1902), Scottish professor of Hebrew and Oriental languages
- Andrew Davidson (physician) (1836–1918), Scottish medical missionary and tropical medicine educator
- Andrew Davidson (soldier) (1840–1902), Scottish soldier in the American Civil War
- Andrew Davidson (footballer) (1878–1949), Scottish footballer with Middlesbrough, Bury, Grimsby Town and Southampton
- Andrew Davidson (knight) (1892–1962), captain, footballer, knight, professor, public health official and royal physician
- Andrew Davidson (educationalist) (1894–1982), New Zealand teacher and educationalist
- Andrew Hope Davidson (1895–1967), professor of midwifery
- Andrew Nevile Davidson (1899–1976), Church of Scotland minister
- Andrew Davidson, 2nd Viscount Davidson (1928–2012), British peer and Conservative politician
- Andrew Davidson (illustrator) (born 1958), British illustrator
- Andrew Davidson (author) (born 1969), Canadian writer
- Andrew Davidson (Big Brother), contestant on the first series of Big Brother UK in 2000
- Andrew Davidson (rugby union) (born 1996), Scottish rugby player

== See also ==
- Andy Davidson (disambiguation)
- Andrew Davison (disambiguation)
