= The Curse of Minerva =

Poem by Lord Byron

- 1812 title page, first edition. London, Thomas Davison.
- Author: Lord Byron
- Language: English
- Genre: Romance/Epic poetry
- Published: 1812. Printer: Thomas Davison
- Publication place: United Kingdom
- Media type: Print
- Pages: 21
- Length: 309 lines

The Curse of Minerva is a poem by Lord Byron first published in 1812 privately and printed by Thomas Davison in London. It is a scathing satirical poem attacking Thomas Bruce, Lord Elgin, for removing the Parthenon sculptures or Elgin Marbles from Athens. Byron's name did not appear on the title page.

== Background ==
The poem consists of heroic couplets that feature the Roman goddess Minerva or in Greek mythology the goddess Athena. She harshly attacks Lord Elgin and Great Britain for taking the ancient sculptures, seen as desecration, theft, and cultural imperialism.

Minerva accuses the British of eradicating and destroying Greek culture and historical legacy similar to the outrages committed by the Goths and Turks.

The removal is tantamount to plunder, argues Byron, who regarded them as sacred objects sold off to Britain for profit. Byron characterizes British society as based on greed, exploitation, and corruption. The theft of the marbles, as he saw it, was motivated by greed.

Byron had written the poem in 1811 at the Capuchin Convent, Athens, on March 17, after visiting Greece himself, where he witnessed the depredations against the sculptures.

The "curse" is against Elgin by the Roman goddess Minerva, Athena in Greek, for his "cultural vandalism". Byron predicts that Elgin will suffer future condemnation and ruin for his actions, which will destroy his legacy and credibility.

The epigraph is a two-line passage in Latin from Virgil's Aeneid, Book XII: "Pallas te hoc vulnere, Pallas Immolat, et poenam scelerato ex sanguine sumit": "It is Pallas who sacrifices you with this stroke, and Pallas who makes your guilty blood pay atonement!". The lines are spoken by Aeneas as he kills Turnus at the very end of the Aeneid. Pallas is another name for Minerva, the Greek goddess Athena, who curses Lord Elgin for "spoiling" her fane by removing the Parthenon Marbles. The themes of revenge and retribution are invoked against Elgin's "guilty blood" for illegally seizing the marbles.

== Publication history ==
Although written in 1811, the work was not published until 1812, privately by Byron, printed by Thomas Davison, Lombard-Street, Whitefriars, London. The Curse of Minerva was republished in Paris by Galignani in 1820. The work was republished in 1898 in The Poetical Works of Lord Byron by John Murray in London.

== Influence ==
Byron's powerful and scathing attack influenced and shaped public opinion against Lord Elgin’s removal of the Parthenon Marbles, characterizing it as plundering and looting the national and historical heritage and legacy of another country, in this case, Greece. The stinging rebuke stigmatized Elgin, sparked the ongoing repatriation discussion and debate, which continues into the 21st century, and contributed greatly to the principle that national cultural heritage should be protected and preserved.

== Adaptations ==
In June 2023, the British Committee for the Reunification of the Parthenon Marbles (BCRPM) presented a live reading of the poem in Room 18 of the British Museum, featuring actors Bill Nighy, Simon Callow, Stockard Channing, and other performers.

A 2021 film short titled The Curse of Minerva was produced by Alkhemia Productions. This film was edited by Graham Roos from footage shot for a 2010 feature project, "George," and features a senior cast including Dame Janet Suzman, Sir Donald Sinden, and Fenella Fielding. The film project featuring the poem also incorporated elements of Byron's Manfred, creating a mix of Byron’s poetic works into a "cine-poem" format.

== Sources ==
- Beresford, James. “'The Curse of Minerva' (2011).” Minerva: The International Review of Ancient Art & Archaeology. 2011.
- Esterhammer, Angela. "Translating the Elgin Marbles: Byron, Hemans, Keats." The Wordsworth Circle 40.1 (2009): 29-36.
- Ferber, Michael. "The Curse of the Ephesians: a long footnote to Byron." The Byron Journal 33.1 (2005): 43-51.
- Franklin, Caroline. "Byron and history." Palgrave Advances in Byron Studies. London: Palgrave Macmillan UK, 2007. 81-105.
- Griffin, Annie, "'A Shadow of a Magnitude': The Parthenon Marbles Through the Eyes of Keats and Byron" (2023). Honors Projects. 190. https://digitalcommons.spu.edu/honorsprojects/190
- Koutsolabropoulos, Angelos. "The Curse of Minerva: Elgin's Acquisition of Misfortune." 2021. Academia.edu.
- Merryman, John Henry. "Thinking about the Elgin marbles." Michigan Law Review (1985): 1881-1923.
- Schuberth, Richard. "Der Fluch der Minerva. Lord Byron und die Elgin Marbles." Merkur 78 (2024): 34-45.
- Scott, John A. "Byron and the Elgin Marbles". The Classical Journal, Vol. 19, No. 4 (Jan., 1924), pp. 241-242.
- Tong, Q. S. "The aesthetic of imperial ruins: the Elgins and John Bowring." Boundary 2 (2006).
