= Alan Davidson =

Alan Davidson may refer to:

- Alan Davidson (food writer) (1924–2003), also British diplomat
- Alan Hayes Davidson (1960–2018), architectural artist
- Alan Davidson (cricketer, born 1929) (1929–2021), Australian Test cricketer
- Alan Davidson (cricketer, born 1897) (1897–1962), Australian cricketer, played 4 first-class cricket matches for Victoria 1927–31
- Alan Davidson (author) (born 1943), British author
- Alan Davidson (Australian soccer) (born 1960), Australian association football player
- Alan Davidson (Scottish footballer) (born 1960), Scottish football goalkeeper
- Alan B. Davidson, American government official and attorney

== See also ==
- Allan Davidson (disambiguation)
- Allen Turner Davidson (1819–1905), Confederate politician.
