= Davidsen (name) =

- Pronunciation: \d(a)-vid-sen\

Origin
- Meaning: "David's son"
- Region of origin: Denmark

Other names
- Variant form: See David (name) § Surnames

Davidsen is a Scandinavian patronymic surname, meaning "son of David". There are alternate spellings, including those common in England, Wales, and Scotland: Davidson, Davisson, Davison, Daveson, and Davidsson. Davidsen may refer to:

== Surname ==
- Agnethe Davidsen (1947–2007), Greenland politician
- Ingolf Davidsen (1893–1946), Norwegian gymnast
- Jóhan Troest Davidsen (born 1988), Faroese football player
- Leif Davidsen (born 1950), Danish author
- Lise Davidsen (born 1987), Norwegian singer
- Mette Davidsen (born 1976), Norwegian handball player
- Vidar Davidsen (born 1958), Norwegian football coach

== See also ==
- Davidsen (disambiguation)
- Davidson (name)
