= Ogunlade =

Nigerian given name

- Gender: Male
- Language: Yoruba

Origin
- Origin: Nigeria
- Meaning: Ògún is the crown,Ogun is what we have covered our head with or Ògún broke forth to come.
- Region of origin: South West, Nigeria

Ogunlade is a Nigerian male given name and surname of Yoruba origin. It means different meaning which includes "Ògún is the crown,Ogun is what we have covered our head with or Ògún broke forth to come. Notable individuals with the name include:

- Aladetoyinbo Ogunlade Aladelusi, Odundun II, a Nigerian monarch.
- Ogunlade Davidson (26 May 1949 – 8 October 2022), a Sierra Leonean scientist.
