= Jim Davidson (disambiguation) =

Jim Davidson (born 1953) is an English comedian.

Jim Davidson may also refer to:

- Jim Davidson (actor) (born 1963), American actor
- Jim Davidson (American football), American football player in 1964 Ohio State Buckeyes football team
- Jim Davidson (author), Australian author and former editor of Meanjin
- Jim Davidson (rugby union, born 1931), former Scotland rugby union international
- Jim Davidson (rugby union, born 1942) (1942–2007), Ireland rugby union player and manager
- James Hutchinson Davidson (1902–1982), Australian bandleader commonly known as Jim Davidson

== See also ==
- James Davidson (disambiguation)
- Jimmy Davidson (disambiguation)
