= The Granites gold mine =

Gold mine in the Northern Territory of Australia

The Granites
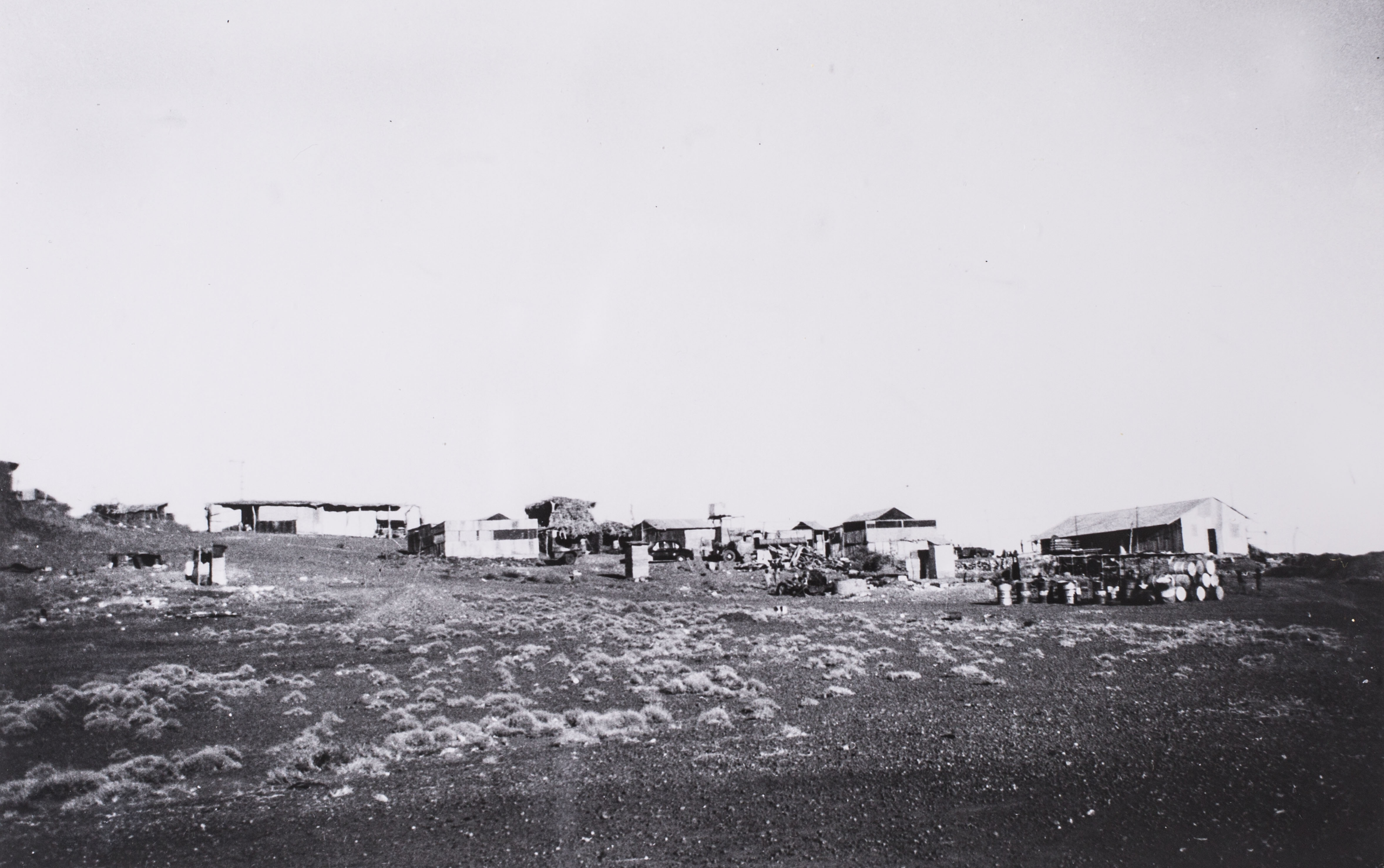
- The Granites in 1952

- Location in the Northern Territory
- Location: Tanami, Northern Territory, Northern Territory, Australia; 20°32′21″S 130°18′43″E
- Products: gold
- Company: Newmont Goldcorp

The Granites, also known as the Tanami Mine, is a gold mine in the Tanami Desert of the Northern Territory of Australia. It has been operated by Newmont Mining since 2002. The mine is about 540 km (340 mi) north-west of Alice Springs.

== History ==
The first European person to find and recognise gold in the Tanami Desert was Allan Arthur Davidson, who arrived in the area in 1898 and continued prospecting until 1901. He took the name Tanami for the region from local Aboriginal people who visited his camp. "On inquiry [he] learned that the native name of the rockholes (from [which the party obtained water] was Tanami, and that they "never died," he said. Davidson showed the gold specimens to these Aboriginal people, who recognised it and described "mobs of similar stone to the east, together with a large creek containing plenty of water and fish. This they said was "two days' sleep to the south of east".

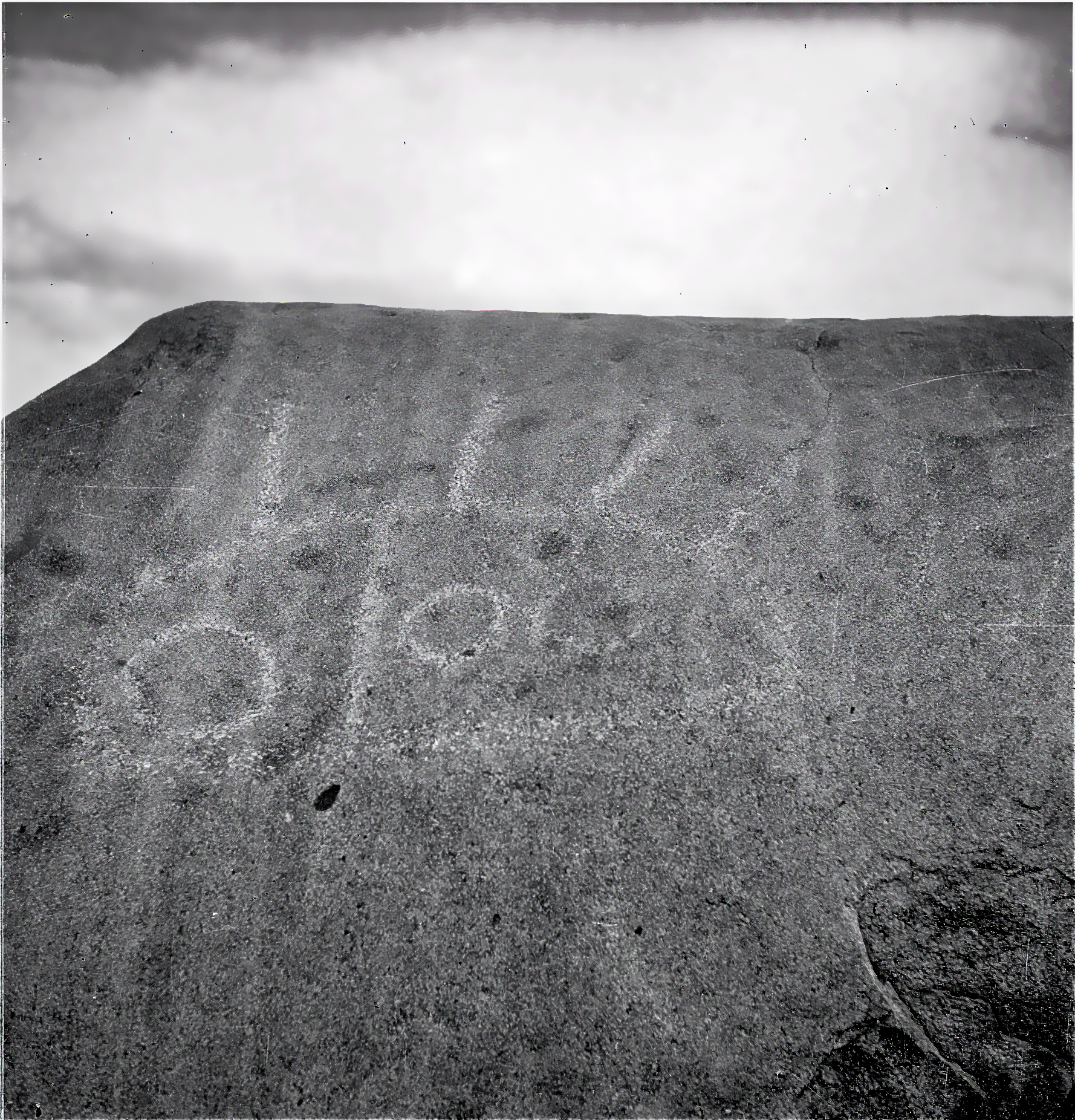
Charles P. Mountford (1936) Rock markings, The Granites, N.T. This image was taken during a University of Adelaide expedition.

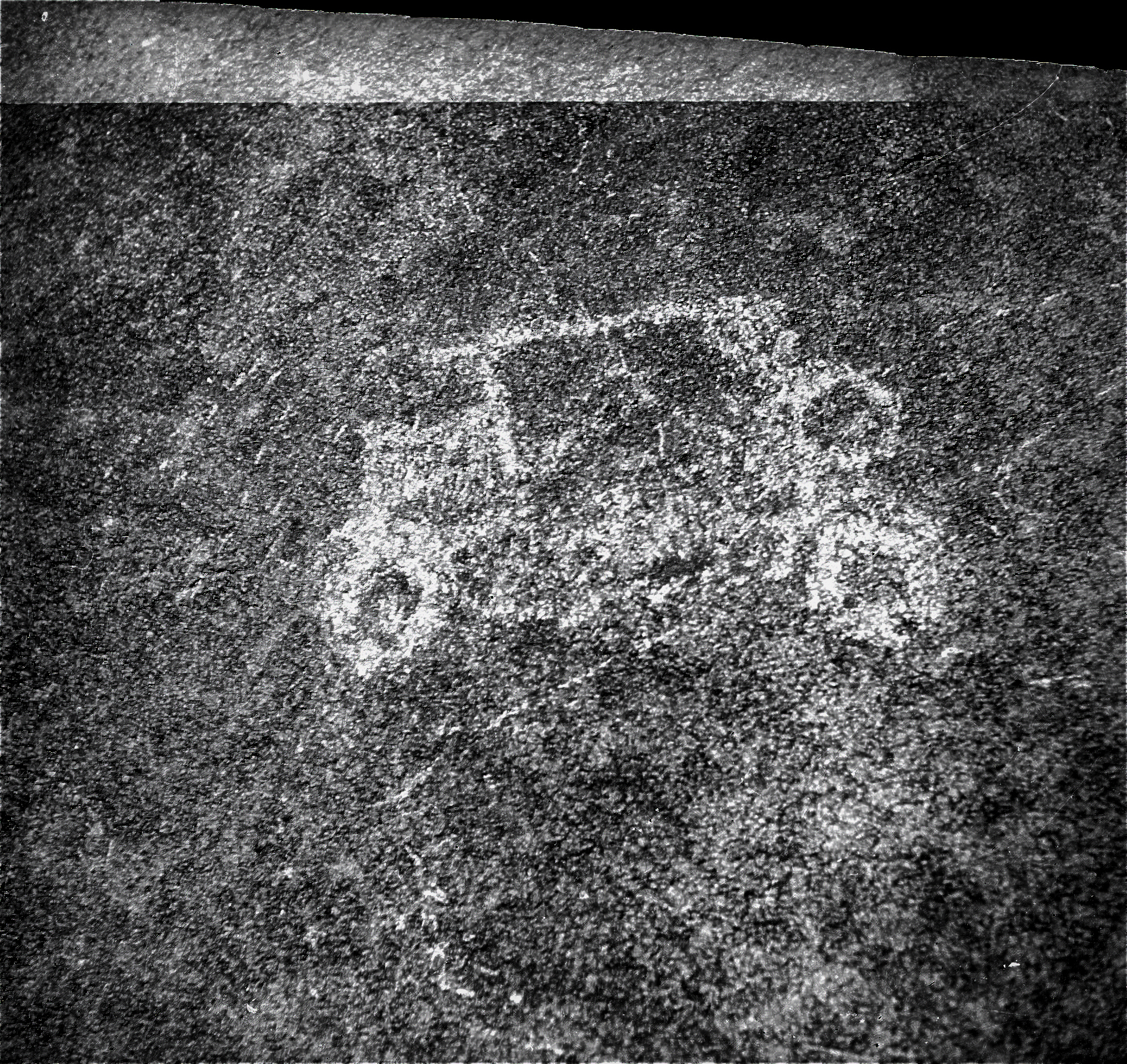
Charles P. Mountford (1936) Rock marking of a motor vehicle, The Granites, N.T.

In 1936 anthropologist Charles P. Mountford, during an expedition with organised by the University of Adelaide's board for anthropological research, photographed the activities of aboriginal people drinking from the waterholes, knapping found fragments of bottle glass to make spearheads, and spinning strings from animal fur.

== Recent history ==
Newmont purchased the mine in 2002.

In 2016, Newmont Mining undertook a $120 million upgrade of the mine, constructing a new decline and processing facilities, taking the mine's life to 2027.

On 25 June 2021, during the COVID-19 pandemic in Australia, a worker tested positive for COVID-19 sending the mine into lockdown. About 750 FIFO (fly-in/fly-out) workers onsite were affected, while 900 who had left the site recently had to go into isolation.
