= Andy Davidson =

Andy Davidson may refer to:

- Andy Davidson (footballer) (1932–2014), Hull City appearance record holder
- Andy Davidson (game designer), British video game designer
- Andy Davidson (Torchwood), a fictional character on the BBC science fiction series Torchwood, portrayed by actor Tom Price
- Andy Davidson, author of The Boatman's Daughter

== See also ==
- Andrew Davidson (disambiguation)
