= Allan Davidson =

Allan Davidson may refer to:

- Allan Arthur Davidson (1873–1930) Australian mining engineer, prospector and explorer
- Allan Douglas Davidson (1873–1932), English painter
- Allan A. Davidson, lawyer and political figure in New Brunswick, Canada
- Scotty Davidson (Allan McLean Davidson, 1891–1915), Canadian ice hockey player and soldier

== See also ==
- Alan Davidson (disambiguation)
