= Chris Davidson =

Chris Davidson may refer to:

- Chris Davidson (athlete) (born 1975), English long jumper
- Chris Davidson (rower) (born 1971), Canadian Olympic rower
- Chris Davidson (surfer) (1978–2022), Australian surfer
