= Jimmy Davidson =

Jimmy Davidson may refer to:

- Jimmy Davidson (Australian footballer) (1904–1953), Australian footballer
- Jimmy Davidson (footballer, born 1873) (1873–?), Scottish footballer
- Jimmy Davidson (footballer, born 1925) (1925–1996), Scottish footballer

== See also ==
- Jim Davidson (disambiguation)
- James Davidson (disambiguation)
