= Xavier Galezowski =

Polish ophthalmologist in France

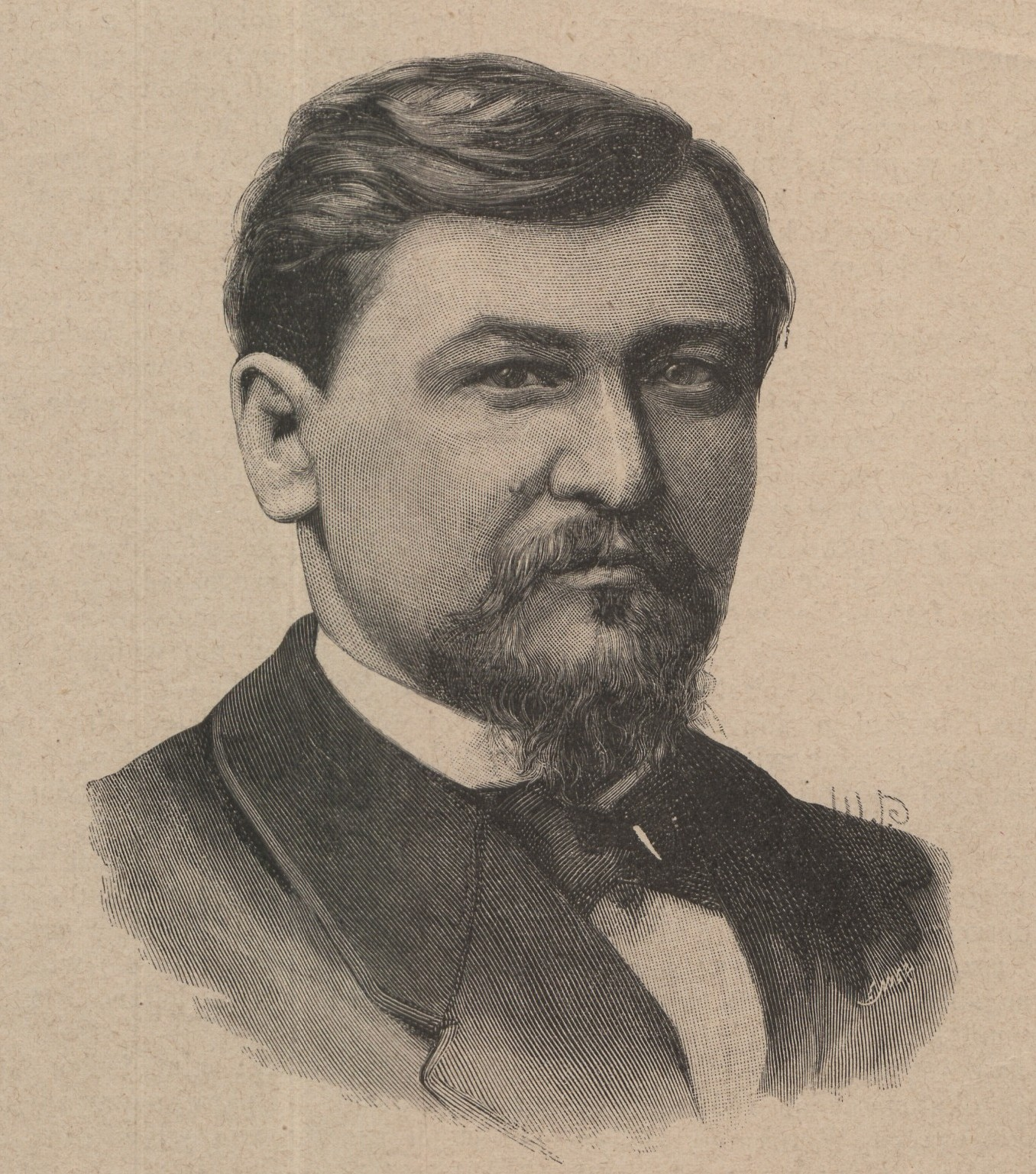
- Born: Ksawery Gałęzowski; 3 January 1832; Lipowiec, Poland
- Died: 22 March 1907 (aged 75); Paris, France
- Burial place: Pere Lachaise Cemetery, Paris
- Education: University of St. Petersburg. Medical Faculty of Paris
- Occupation: ophthalmologist
- Known for: private ophthalmologic clinic in Paris
- Notable work: Journal d'Ophtalmologie (later the Recueil d'Ophtalmologie)
- Parents: Franciszek Gałęzowski (father); Antonina Gałęzowski née Szokalska (mother)
- Awards: National Order of the Legion of Honour

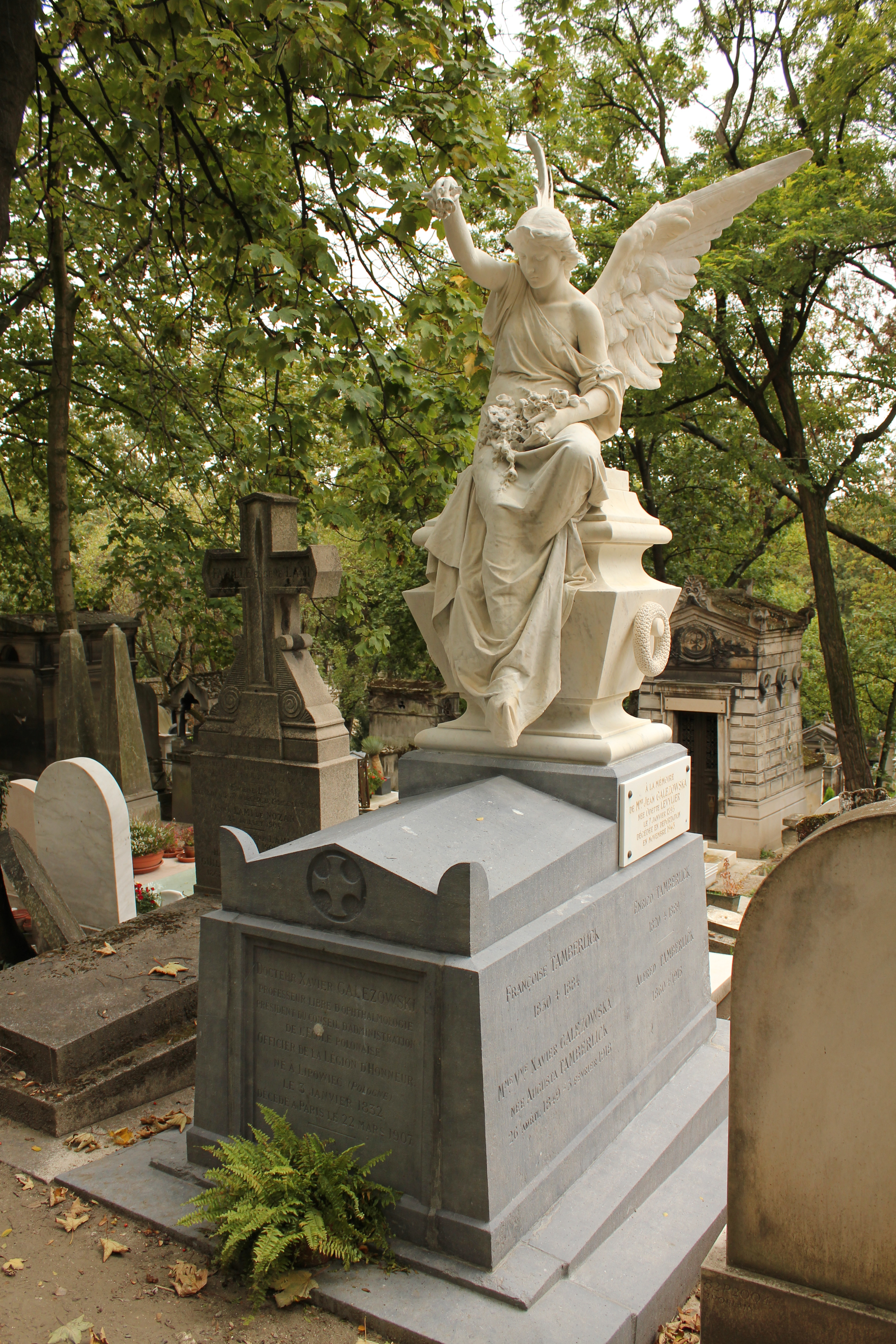
Xavier Galezowski's tombstone in Pere Lachaise Cemetery, Paris

Xavier Galezowski (1832–1907) was a Polish ophthalmologist practicing in France who was one of the first clinical practitioners of his specialty.

== Education ==
Galezowski was born as Ksawery Gałęzowski in Lipowiec, Poland (after partitions part of the Russian Empire), to Franciszek and Antonina née Szokalska. He earned a degree in medicine from the University of St. Petersburg in 1858 and received a gold medal for his thesis on the ophthalmoscope. After moving to Paris and studying ophthalmology with Louis-Auguste Desmarres, Galezowski earned another medical degree from the Medical Faculty of Paris.

Prof Alexander Dyce Davidson trained under Galezowski and Desmarres in Paris.

== Career ==
Galezowski opened his private ophthalmologic clinic in Paris in 1867. As one of the first private practitioners of his specialty, and due to his skill, Gazelowski's public reputation grew and his clinic treated an average of 8800 patients per year. Galezowski created the Journal d'Ophtalmologie (later the Recueil d'Ophtalmologie) in 1872—the first French journal of ophthalmology. In 1882 he published in the medical journal The Lancet the first description of retinal migraine. Among his patients was Paul Lafargue, who spoke admiringly of Galezowski's work in a letter to Friedrich Engels, who also suffered from tear duct problems, dated July 28, 1887.

Galezowski was also awarded the National Order of the Legion of Honour for service the Franco-Prussian War.
