= Charles Davidson =

Charles or Charlie or Charley Davidson may refer to:

- Sir Charles Davidson (politician) (1897–1985), Australian politician
- Sir Charles Peers Davidson (1841–1929), Canadian lawyer and judge
- Charles Davidson (RAF officer) (1896–1936), British World War I flying ace
- Charles Davidson (watercolour painter) (1824–1902), British watercolour painter
- Charles Findlay Davidson (1911–1967), Scottish geologist
- Charles Davidson (bishop), Bishop of Guyana since 2015
- Charlie Davidson (born 1972), American football player
- Charley Davidson (fl. 1940s), American baseball player
