= Arthur Davidson =

Arthur Davidson may refer to:

- Sir Arthur Davidson (equerry) (1856–1922), British Army officer and equerry to Queen Victoria, King Edward VII and King George V
- Arthur Davidson (footballer, born 1875) (1875−1961), Australian rules footballer for Fitzroy
- Arthur Davidson (motorcycling) (1881–1950), American co-founder of Harley-Davidson
- Arthur Davidson (footballer, born 1912) (1912–2002), Australian rules footballer for Hawthorn
- Arthur Davidson (politician) (1928–2018), British Labour MP for Accrington, 1966–1983

== See also ==
- Arthur Davison, rugby league player
