= Alexander Davison (disambiguation) =

Alexander Davison was a businessman.

Alexander or Alex Davison may also refer to:

- Lex Davison (1923–1965), Australian racing driver
- Alex Davison (born 1979), Australian racing driver
- Alexander Hubert Hawdon Davison, Surveyor General of South Australia

== See also ==
- Alexander Davidson (disambiguation)
