= Hugh Davidson =

Hugh Davidson is the name of:

- Hugh Davidson (actor), American actor and screenwriter
- Hugh Davidson (American football) (1928–2020), American football coach and scout
- Hugh Davidson (footballer) (born 1980), Scottish footballer
- Hugh Davidson (composer) (1930–2014), Canadian composer, music critic and arts administrator
- Hugh Davidson (cricketer) (1907–1960), Australian cricketer
- Hugh Davidson (marketer) British marketing author and businessman
