= Graeme Davidson =

Scottish footballer (born 1968)

Personal information
- Full name: Graeme Davidson
- Date of birth: 18 January 1968 (age 58)
- Place of birth: Edinburgh, Scotland
- Position: Defender

Senior career*
Years	Team	Apps	(Gls)
1988-1989	Dunfermline Athletic	1	(0)
1989-1993	Berwick Rangers	135	(7)
1993-1995	Meadowbank Thistle	36	(0)
1995-1998	Livingston	63	(0)
1998-2002	Stenhousemuir	77	(1)
- * Club domestic league appearances and goals

Graeme Davidson (born 18 January 1968) is a Scottish former footballer who played as a defender for Stenhousemuir and Livingston.

== Career ==
=== Playing career ===
Davidson started his career at Dunfermline Athletic but only made one appearance for the Pars before departing the club in 1989.

He signed for Berwick Rangers and went on to make 135 appearances for the Wee Gers, which put him in the top 50 for all-time appearances at the club. In 1992-92, Davidson won the Skol League Cup sprint competition to find the fastest footballer over 60m in the Scottish Leagues. He recorded the fastest time of 7.13 seconds.

The defender joined Meadowbank Thistle in 1993 and was part of the side that moved to Livingston in 1995. Davidson made 99 appearances altogether during his time at Meadowbank Thistle and Livingston.

Davidson signed for Stenhousemuir in 1998 and quickly became a fan favourite. He was troubled with injuries at this stage of his career and made just 77 appearances in 4 years for the Warriors.

== Personal life ==
In 2010, Davidson was charged over an alleged £355,000 mortgage fraud. He was arrested during a police probe into fraud and money laundering.
