= Andrew Hope Davidson =

RCS professor

Andrew Hope Davidson MD, FRCPI, FRCOG (May 29, 1895 – February 12, 1967) was professor of midwifery at the Royal College of Surgeons in Ireland.

He graduated from Trinity College in 1917, and subsequently served with the Royal Army Medical Corps in Palestine and Syria during the First World War. He returned to Dublin, and qualified in medicine in 1920.

He was master of the Rotunda Hospital from 1933 to 1940, and oversaw the development of many new services and facilities He was appointed to the Royal City of Dublin Hospital in 1940. In 1948, he became gynaecologist at Sir Patrick Dun's Hospital. He was King's Professor of Midwifery from 14 January 1953 to 6 May 1960.

Some of his medical contributions were in the areas of postpartum infections, pelvimetry, and Caesarean section.

He was a foundation fellow of the Royal College of Obstetricians and Gynaecologists.
