= Alan Davidson (author) =

Alan Davidson (born 1943) began his writing career sub-editing Roy of the Rovers for the British comics magazine Tiger and was soon contributing his own stories to other British comics and associated annuals. He later worked for Oxfam. His first children's novel was published in 1978.

The publication of A Friend Like Annabel (1983), a collection of humorous and distinctly British stories, inspired by his own children, brought him recognition as a humorous writer and comparisons with Richmal Crompton. Four more collections of stories followed: Just Like Annabel, Even More Like Annabel, The New, Thinking Annabel and Little Yearnings of Annabel, Davidson's "laconic style" accounting for their popularity. When the original publisher's children's list closed, the rights were acquired by a second publisher and the five books reissued in new editions, together with backlist novels. One of these, The Bewitching of Alison Allbright, remained in print for nearly twenty years.

The Annabel collections were complemented in the 1990s by more British humour including the "very funny" but much younger Catfoot books and a one-off comic novel (for all ages), Escape from Cold Ditch, a satire about battery hens featuring John Richardson's cartoon-style drawings. An audio version was released, narrated by the actress Joanna Lumley. The book became the subject of a long running controversy following the release of the hit film Chicken Run in June 2000, the author alleging plagiarism. Court papers were issued in 2003 but the case did not come to trial.

His most recent book Light is considered thought provoking and returns to the straightforward narrative form of the earlier, longer novels. Davidson worked for Oxfam as a writer, parliamentary lobbyist and editor of its newspaper, Oxfam News. In 1990, as an author, he was appointed a Fellow of English Poets, Essayists and Novelists (English PEN), serving on its executive committee for several years and subsequently on its Writers in Prison Committee.

Many of his children's books have been reissued in e-format. 2019 saw the publication of his 1975 serial Fran of the Floods as a graphic novel. This prescient story about the possible effects of global warming was described as a masterclass by one reviewer and compared to the work of John Wyndham. ^https://www.amazon.co.uk/Jinty-Fran-Floods-Gascoine-Phil/dp/1781086729/ref=sr_1_1?keywords=fran+of+the+floods&qid=1567934007&s=books&sr=1-1
