= Gerald Davison =

American psychologist and professor

- Born: 1939 (age 86–87)
- Occupations: Psychologist, gerontologist, academic

Academic work
- Institutions: The University of Southern California

Gerald C. Davison (born 1939) is an American psychologist and professor. He is currently Professor of Psychology and Gerontology and former dean of the Leonard Davis School of Gerontology at the University of Southern California.

== Education ==
Gerald C. Davison completed a bachelor of arts in social relations at Harvard College in 1961. He spent a Fulbright year in Germany at University of Freiburg in 1961-1962. He obtained his Ph.D. in psychology at Stanford University in 1965.

== Career ==
In 1973-1974 Davison served as president of the Association for Behavioral and Cognitive Therapies. He is Professor of Psychology and Gerontology and former dean of the Leonard Davis School of Gerontology at the University of Southern California.

He has authored more than 150 publications dealing with topics such as experimental analysis of psychopathology, therapeutic change and the links between cognition and a variety of behavioral and emotional problems. Davison has co-authored the textbooks Abnormal Psychology, Case Studies in Abnormal Psychology and Clinical Behavior Therapy.

In 2018, he was featured in an episode of a Radiolab podcast, UnErased where he spoke about his seminal role in 1974 in arguing against sexual reorientation (aka conversion) therapies for gay individuals. “Conversion” (2022) is a one-hour biographical documentary film based on the podcast and is on Amazon Prime Video, Google Play, iTunes, and YouTube.

== Awards and honors ==
Davison received the Lifetime Achievement Award in 2003 from the Association for Behavioral and Cognitive Therapies and in 2020 the Clinical Science Visionary Award from the Society for a Science of Clinical Psychology of the American Psychological Association. He is a fellow of the Association for Psychological Science, the American Psychological Association, and the Academy of Cognitive Therapy.

== See also ==
- Applied behavior analysis
- LGBTQ psychology
