= Arthur Davison =

Australian rugby league footballer

Playing information
- Position: Halfback
Club
Years	Team	Pld	T	G	FG	P
1914	Eastern Suburbs	1	0	0	0	0

Arthur Davison was an Australian professional rugby league footballer in the New South Wales Rugby League (NSWRL) Competition.

Davison played for Eastern Suburbs side in the 1914 season, the year the club won its first City Cup. He only made one appearance, playing his only career game in Easts' 2–9 loss to Balmain in round 14.
