= Alex Davidson (footballer, born 1878) =

Scottish footballer

Personal information
- Full name: Alexander Lauder Davidson
- Date of birth: 27 September 1878
- Place of birth: Armadale, West Lothian, Scotland
- Date of death: 1929 (aged 50–51)
- Position: Centre forward

Senior career*
Years	Team	Apps	(Gls)
1898–1899	Beith		
1899	Third Lanark		
1899–1900	Glossop	13	(1)
1900–1901	Manchester City	7	(1)
1901–1902	Reading		
1902	West Ham United		
1902	Luton Town		
1903	Fulham		
1903	New Brompton		
1903	Kilmarnock		
1904	Aberdeen		
1904	Swindon Town		
1904	Stockport County		
1905	Atherton Church House		
1905	Wigan Town		
1906	Bolton Wanderers	0	(0)
1906	Nelson		
1907	Macclesfield		
1908	Denton		
Total		20	(2)
- * Club domestic league appearances and goals

Alexander Lauder Davidson (27 September 1878 – 1929) was a Scottish footballer who played in the Football League for Glossop and Manchester City.
