= James Davison (disambiguation) =

James Davison (born 1986) is an Australian race car driver .

James Davison may also refer to:

- James Davison (California politician) (1827–1897), American politician
- James Davison (Wisconsin politician) (1828–?), Irish-born Wisconsin politician
- James Davison (poet/songwriter), English lawyer, poet and songwriter
- James William Davison (1813–1885), English journalist

== See also ==
- James Davidson (disambiguation)
