= James S. Davidson =

Louisiana reconstruction era American politician

Louisiana House of Representatives
- In office 1871–1880

Louisiana Senate
- In office 1880–1884

Louisiana House of Representatives
- In office 1884–1896

Personal details
- Party: Republican

James. S. Davidson was a Reconstruction era politician who served in the Louisiana House of Representatives and the Louisiana Senate.

Davidson was first elected to represent Iberville Parish, Louisiana in the Louisiana House of Representatives from 1871 until 1880. He then served in the Louisiana Senate from 1880 until 1884 before returning to the house to serve from 1884 until 1892.

Davidson was a delegate to the 1876 Republican State Convention representing Iberville Parish, Louisiana. Next he was a delegate to the 1879 Louisiana Constitutional Convention. He was also a delegate to the Congressional Convention May 1880 in New Orleans where he was appointed to be a member of the District Committee representing Iberville Parish along with J. W. A. Verrett.

He also was a U.S. warehouse keeper after the reconstruction era.

== See also ==
- African American officeholders from the end of the Civil War until before 1900
