= Hugh Davidson (marketer) =

British businessman and author (born 1935)

- Born: J Hugh Davidson; 7 May 1935; Isle of Man
- Education: Corpus Christi College, Cambridge
- Occupation: Social entrepreneur
- Known for: Author of Offensive Marketing

Hugh Davidson, MBE, is a British businessman, social entrepreneur and author of several books on improving the practice of marketing.

== Early life and education ==
Hugh Davidson was born on the Isle of Man. He went to school at Clifton College before spending two years in the Royal Artillery.

He studied Economics and Law at Corpus Christi College, Cambridge and after university passed both the Preliminary and Final Bar Exams in the top 1%, qualifying as a barrister-at-law.

== Career in marketing ==
Davidson joined the Marketing Department at Procter and Gamble (UK). After managing Fairy Liquid and Daz he became Marketing Manager of McVities Biscuits, then moved to the USA with Glendinning Consultants International, later becoming European Director.

He was hired by Playtex where he held posts as President, Playtex Canada before re-crossing the Atlantic as President of Playtex International in Europe.

After Playtex, Davidson, co-founded the consultancy, Oxford Strategic Marketing, focusing on marketing best practice and implementation and with a policy of hiring only experienced practitioners from blue chip marketing firms.

Davidson was Chairman of the UK Marketing Society and gave the keynote speech at the Society's 50th Anniversary Conference. He is a Fellow of the Marketing Society and the Chartered Institute of Marketing.

== Books and academic activities ==
Davidson has written a number of influential books, characterised by a practical approach that prioritises action and implementation, including “Offensive Marketing” which sold over 100,000 copies and “Even More Offensive Marketing", which was a Finalist in the 1997 Financial Times Global Business Book awards. Co-authored versions have been published in Germany (with Professor Anton Meyer) and the USA (with Professor Warren Keegan). Offensive Marketing was described as "Practical wisdom in an inspired packaging" by Philip Kotler.

In "The Committed Enterprise – How to Make Vision, Values and Branding work" Davidson applied the practical approach to the challenging task of creating lasting visions for organisations, travelling 55,000 miles to interview over 130 global CEOs and leaders in education, NGOs, healthcare and the police.

For 12 years, Davidson was Visiting Professor of Consumer Marketing at Cranfield University School of Management and has been published in the Harvard Business Review, The Financial Times and Market Leader amongst others.

== Volunteer and philanthropic projects ==
While at Procter and Gamble, Davidson was a Prison Visitor at Durham Prison for 5 years. He has been a volunteer with Save The Children for over 40 years, serving at various times as Chairman of the Trading Committee, Member of Council and Member of the Executive Committee.

In the early 2000s, having sold his majority stake in Oxford Strategic Marketing to the management, he used the proceeds to create a charitable trust with the aim of using the same practical, measurement based approach he'd applied to marketing, to now transforming lives of very poor women and children in West Bengal and Odisha in India, Vietnam, Ghana and Bangladesh.

The Trust targeted increased income amongst women as its goal, and set up eight innovative, higher risk pilot tests, subsequently getting larger charities or organisations to scale up the successes. As ever there was strong emphasis on measurement to gauge success against targets.

Two projects failed, but six succeeded and four have been scaled up by Save The Children or Oxfam (the Trust's primary partners) or by governments.

Key projects have been

- educating street children
- training exploited child domestic workers as beauticians and finding them jobs (in Kolkata).
- trebling income and increasing empowerment by creating women's enterprise groups (in Bangladesh and Odisha, India)
- training 4,500 teachers in tribal areas (in Vietnam)

One of the Trust's projects (in Odisha) developed with Samudram and Oxfam gained a UN Equator Award for poverty reduction in 2010 and the beautician project was given a Save The Children Phoenix Award for Innovation. The H&S Davidson Trust estimates that to date it has transformed the lives of 60,000 people through higher income and greater empowerment.

Hugh Davidson, and his wife, Sandra, personally reviewed all projects, visiting Ghana, India, Vietnam and Bangladesh multiple times.

In 2016, Hugh Davidson was awarded an MBE for services to Charities and to the community of the Isle of Man.

In 2021, the Trust began a project to research the process of scaling up successful women's development projects. The project involves a literature review, qualitative interviews with front line and senior charity workers and a quantitative survey (in partnership with philanthropy experts Alliance)

== Articles ==
1. Article: How Marketers Need to Change
2. Article: How marketing has lost the plot
