= Robert Davidson =

Robert, Bob or Bobby Davidson may refer to:

== Arts ==
- Robert Davidson (artist) (born 1946), Alaska-born Canadian Haida artist
- Robert Davidson (composer) (born 1965), Australian composer and double bassist
- Robert Davidson (photographer), British rock photographer
- Robert Davidson (poet) (1778–1855), Scottish poet and labourer
- Robert Lee Davidson, American guitarist
- Robert William Davidson (1904–1982), American sculptor

== Politics ==
- Robert Davidson (Australian politician) (1856–1931), New South Wales politician
- Robert Davidson (Canadian politician) (1875–1948), Canadian member of Parliament
- Robert H. M. Davidson (1832–1908), U.S. representative from Florida
- Robert C. Davidson (1850–1924), mayor of Baltimore

== Sport ==
=== Association football (soccer) ===
- Robert Davidson (footballer, born 1876) (1876–1935), Scottish footballer
- Bobby Davidson (footballer) (1913–1988), Scottish footballer
- Bobby Davidson (1928–1993), Scottish football referee
- Bob Davidson (footballer) (born 1986), Scottish footballer

=== Other sports ===
- Bob Davidson (ice hockey) (1912–1996), Canadian Hockey player
- Bob Davidson (rugby union) (1926–1992), Australian rugby union footballer of the 1940s and 1950s
- Bob Davidson (umpire) (born 1952), baseball umpire
- Robert Davidson (fencer) (born 1958), Australian Olympic fencer
- Bob Davidson (pitcher) (born 1963), baseball pitcher

== Other people ==
- Robert Davidson, Provost of Aberdeen (died 1411), leader of Aberdeen City Council, Scotland
- Robert Davidson (educator) (1750–1812), American educator, clergyman and composer
- Robert Davidson (inventor) (1804–1894), Scottish inventor who built the first known electric locomotive in 1837
- Robert Davidson (theologian) (1927–2012), professor emeritus in the University of Glasgow
- Robert Harold Davidson (1919–1982), United States Marine officer
- Robert Laurenson Dashiell Davidson (1909–1998), American philatelist

== See also ==
- Robert Davison (disambiguation)
