= William Davison =

William Davison may refer to:

- William Davison (diplomat) (c. 1541–1608), secretary to Queen Elizabeth I
- William Davison (publisher) (1781–1858) of Alnwick, British printer and publisher
- William Davison, 1st Baron Broughshane (1872–1953), British peer and Conservative Member of Parliament
- William Ruxton Davison (died 1893), British ornithologist and collector
- Will Davison (born 1982), Australian racing driver
- Bill Davison (1906–1989), jazz musician

== See also ==
- William Davidson (disambiguation)
