= Alex Davidson (footballer, born 1920) =

Scottish footballer

Personal information
- Full name: Alexander Morrison Davidson
- Date of birth: 6 June 1920
- Place of birth: Langholm, Scotland
- Date of death: 11 February 2005 (aged 84)
- Place of death: Helensburgh, Scotland
- Height: 5 ft 7 in (1.70 m)
- Position: Inside forward

Youth career
- St Roch's

Senior career*
Years	Team	Apps	(Gls)
1937–1940	Hibernian	15	(2)
1944	Lincoln City (guest)		
1946–1948	Chelsea	2	(0)
1948–1949	Crystal Palace	10	(2)
- Clacton Town
Total		27	(4)
- * Club domestic league appearances and goals

Alex Davidson (6 June 1920 – 11 February 2005) was a Scottish footballer. Davidson played for Hibernian in the Scottish Football League before the Second World War. He scored a late equalising goal in an Edinburgh derby against Hearts on 1 January 1938. During the war, he played for Lincoln City as a guest. When league football resumed after the war, Davidson played for Chelsea and Crystal Palace in the English Football League.
