= Paul Davidson =

Paul Davidson may refer to:

- Paul Davidson (author) (born 1971), American author and blogger
- Paul Davidson (businessman) (born 1947), English CEO
- Paul "The Plumber" Davidson (born 1955), British businessman
- Paul Davidson (economist) (born 1930), American macroeconomist
- Paul Davidson (producer) (1867–1927), German film producer
- Paul Davidson (rugby league) (born 1970), English rugby league footballer
- Paul Davidson, character in 31 North 62 East
- Paul Davidson, Jamaican singer who had a 1976 hit with "Midnight Rider"

== See also ==
- Paul Davison (born 1971), snooker player
- John-Paul Davidson (born 1953), director, producer and writer
