= The Boatman's Daughter =

2020 novel by Andy Davidson

- Author: Andy Davidson
- Audio read by: Samantha Desz
- Language: English
- Genre: Gothic horror
- Published: 2020
- Publisher: MCD x FSG Originals
- Media type: Print (paperback), ebook, audiobook
- Pages: 416 pages
- ISBN: 0374538557 First edition paperback

The Boatman's Daughter is a 2020 gothic horror novel by Andy Davidson. It was published on February 11, 2020, through the MCD x FSG Originals imprint of Farrar, Straus and Giroux.

== Synopsis ==
Miranda Crabtree spends her time running contraband for the preacher Billy Cotton and sheriff of her local area, as it is the only way she can provide for herself. It also helps her keep an old woman and a child safe, as they had fled from Cotton's home eleven years prior. Miranda's troubles come to a head once she is asked to make one last run, this time to bring a child to the insane Cotton.

== Release ==
The Boatman's Daughter was released in paperback and e-book format in the United States on February 11, 2020 through the MCD x FSG Originals imprint of Farrar, Straus and Giroux. An audiobook adaptation narrated by Samantha Desz was released simultaneously through Macmillan Audio.

The novel was published in the United Kingdom on October 13 of the same year, through Titan Books.

== Reception ==
Reception for The Boatman's Daughter has been positive. Bloody Disgusting recommended the novel to their readers, stating that it was "Gorgeous as it is violent". A reviewer for the Memphis Flyer compared it to the Blackwater series by Michael McDowell, also noting similarities between the book and writings by Joe Hill and Neil Gaiman.

NPR also reviewed The Boatman's Daughter, writing that "At its core, The Boatman's Daughter is a sad tale about love, sacrifice, and how bad people can shape a community and set the lives of others on dark paths."
