= Donald Davidson =

Donald Davidson may refer to:

- Donald Davidson (cricketer) (1904–1985), South African cricketer
- Donald Davidson (historian) (born 1942/3), American historian of the Indianapolis Motor Speedway
- Donald Davidson (philosopher) (1917–2003), American philosopher
- Donald Davidson (poet) (1893–1968), American poet and spokesman for the South
