= Matthew Davidson (disambiguation) =

Matthew Davidson (born 1998) is an American singer-songwriter.

Matthew Davidson or Matt Davidson may also refer to:

- Matt Davidson (baseball) (born 1991), Canadian and American baseball player
- Matt Davidson (ice hockey) (1977–2026), National Hockey League right wing
- Mat Davidson (1869–1949), Australian politician
- Twain (musician)
- Mathew Davison (1839–1918), American politician
- Matthew Wolfe Davidson, United States Air Force brigadier general and former vice commander of the Space Operations Command
