= Andrew Jackson Davison =

African-American attorney

Andrew Jackson Davison (1847–1922) was the first African-American attorney in Athens County, Ohio. He practiced criminal defense, estate and divorce.
