= Mary Davidson =

Mary Davidson may refer to:

- Mary Davidson (Irish politician) (1902–1986), member of Seanad Éireann
- Mary Davidson (artist) (1865–1951), Scottish artist
- Mary Davidson (editor) (1872–1941), American newspaper editor and member of the Illinois House of Representatives
- Mary Ann Davidson, chief security officer of Oracle Corporation
- Mary Ann Maitland (1839–1919), née Davidson, Scottish-born Canadian author
- Mary Wallace Davidson (1935–2012), American music librarian

== See also ==
- MaryJanice Davidson, American author
