= Jim Gussey =

New Zealand trumpeter and conductor

- Born: James Thomas Gussey; 21 February 1906; Auckland, New Zealand
- Died: 6 January 1990 (aged 83) Sydney, New South Wales, Australia
- Occupation: Musician
- Instruments: Trumpet

James Thomas Gussey (21 February 1906 – 6 January 1990) was a New Zealand-born trumpeter who had a successful career in Australia. He is best remembered as conductor of the ABC Dance Band, performing on ABC radio and television networks.

== Biography ==
=== Early life ===
Gussey was born in Auckland, New Zealand, on 21 February 1906, a son of Mary Ann Gussey and Thomas Andrew Gussey. At the age of ten he was playing trumpet with the Ponsonby Boys' Band. He played with various dance bands before moving to Australia in 1925 or around 1928. Another source is more specific: he travelled to Sydney "with Maurie Gilman in 1927; both joined the Jimmie Elkins Band" and began working in theatre bands for J. C. Williamson's.

In January 1928, Gussey's engagement to Olivia Mary (Olive) McKibbin was announced in Sydney, and the couple were married later that year at All Saints' Church, Ponsonby, Auckland, on 1 August.

=== Early career ===
Gussey first worked with Jim Davidson at the Lyric Wintergarden Theatre, where Davidson was the orchestra's drummer, though he also played cornet; the band migrated to the Wentworth Hotel on Lang Street, then to Dawson's fashionable Ambassadors restaurant on Pitt Street and the Oriental (Note: Perhaps the Oriental Hotel on Crown Street) in 1931 when, as Jim Davidson's Dance Orchestra, they first appeared on radio. In 1932 "Jimmie" Gussey was playing at the Astra cabaret, Bondi, in a band that included Dick Slade. Maurie Gilman, Chic Donovan, Frank Guigan, and Noel Young. Gussey joined Davidson's band in 1933.

The ABC Dance Band was founded in 1929 with the foundation of the National Broadcasting Service. Few details have been found of this period, and their mentions in the newspaper programmes were few and sporadic.

Davidson's band became the ABC Dance Band in 1935, with Gussey a member. Others in the band in 1935 were Peter Cantrell (alto saxophone), Dudley Cantrell (trombone), Jack Rickette (piano), Charles Donovan (saxophone), Gordon Rawlinson (piano), Alice Smith (vocals), Frank McLaughlin (alto saxophone), Allen Barr (guitar), Ray Tarrant (trumpet), Tom Stevenson (drums), O. Wills (double bass), John Warren (vocals), and Essie Morrison (piano). In 1936 Davidson left for a stint in Britain and Howard Jacobs took his place for the duration. In 1937 he was a member of an ensemble selected by Davidson to tour Australia, accompanying Gladys Moncrieff, Tex Morton, and harmonica virtuoso Harry Thompson. In 1938 the band made another Australian tour.

In 1941 Davidson joined the Second AIF, appointed to the Australian Army Amenities Service with the rank of captain, and Gussey, who had been acting as his deputy, was appointed conductor in his place. Seven band members also enlisted, so Gussey began with a depleted orchestra, but slowly rebuilt it. Don Burrows was a member for five years. In 1951 the band played at the function accompanying the inaugural ABC Sportsman of the Year award at the Sydney Town Hall. In February 1954 he led the band playing at two balls — Sydney and Canberra — attended by the newly-crowned Elizabeth II.

=== Career on TV ===
He led the ABC dance band in many live-to-air programs in the early days of television in Australia, notably The Lorrae Desmond Show and its successor, Four for the Show. He led the ABC Dance Band in two series of concerts for Australian troops in Vietnam, the first in March 1969. He retired in 1969, and the band's title became the "ABC Sydney Showband".

=== Songwriting and composing ===
Gussey wrote and arranged a large number of songs and orchestral pieces, many of which have been published. They made various 78 rpm recordings for Parlophone and a smaller number of 45 rpm and 33 rpm microgroove records.

=== Death ===
Gussey died in Sydney, New South Wales, aged 83 on 6 January 1990.
