= Zoe Davison =

British racehorse trainer (1960–2021)

Zoe Davison (23 June 1960 – 3 January 2021) was a British horse trainer who trained horses competing in National Hunt racing. She trained at stables near East Grinstead and sent out the winners of more than 100 races between November 1997 and her death from cancer in January 2021. Her horses often performed well at her local racecourses Lingfield Park, Fontwell Park and Plumpton and two of her runners won at Plumpton on the day she died. Her father, Albert Davison, was also a racehorse trainer, and she competed as an amateur jockey before taking up training. She was married with four daughters.
