= Alan Hayes Davidson =

British architect (1960–2018)

- Born: 9 July 1960; United Kingdom
- Died: 28 August 2018 (aged 58)
- Occupations: Architect, artist, Founder of Hayes Davidson
- Organizations: Hayes Davidson, Alan Davidson Foundation
- Known for: Architectural visualisation pioneer and architect
- Website: alandavidsonfoundation.org

Alan Hayes Davidson (1960–2018) was a British architect. He founded the architectural visualisation studio Hayes Davidson and pioneered architectural visualisation between 1989 and 1995. He was briefly married to Elaine Scott Davidson (née Cowell) in 2016 until his death in 2018.

== Early life ==
Alan Hayes Davidson was born on 9 July 1960 to Anne Pretyman Davidson (née Hayes) (1922–2017) and Alexander Munro Davidson (1927–1978). Anne trained as a nurse and midwife before working as a flight attendant for Airwork airlines, a forerunner to BOAC. She married Scottish solicitor Alexander (known as Sandy to friends) Davidson in London in 1959. Alan was born in 1960, his sister Jane in 1961.

Alan attended Robert Gordon's College in Aberdeen (1965–1977). He was a keen sportsman (cricket, badminton, skiing), artist and musician. His father died in 1978 when he was aged 17. He attended Edinburgh University from 1978–1984, first studying Fine Art and then Architecture.

== Technology ==
In 1979 he purchased a Sharp MZ80k, one of the early consumer microcomputers, the start of a lifelong interest in technology and computing. He first worked in Suva, Fiji, for his architectural 'in practice' year in 1982 at 'Architects Pacific', a practice led by Stuart Huggett. On completing his architecture degree Davidson moved to London and worked as an architect and architectural illustrator, using the Macintosh and Harvard University's 'Schema' beta software as a core part of his illustration process.

In 1989 Alan resigned his role as an architect and founded 'Hayes Davidson'. Based in London, Hayes Davidson was the UK's first CGI-based architectural visualisation practice.

He was an avid reader of Marvin Minsky and Jaron Lanier, and held a firm conviction that 3D modelling and rendering were not just an aid to artists, but more importantly were an inevitable and essential part of the base camp required to lead to a fully simulated re-creation of the world around us, as well as new worlds.

In 1996, Alan designed and grew Hayes Davidson’s London studio, "from which it has developed an international client base of world-class designers and architects."

Alan collaborated with the 'Richard Rogers Partnership' (renamed RSHP in 2007) on major projects including Channel 4 and Terminal 5 at Heathrow. Other major architectural clients followed including Zaha Hadid, Norman Foster and Wilkinson Eyre. By 1995 HD had a team of 8 and was pioneering many different approaches to architectural CGI, including interactive illustrations, animations and touchscreen systems. HD won the CICA award for architectural illustration three years running.

== 21 Conduit Place ==
In 1997 Alan purchased and refurbished a warehouse building in Paddington, previously used by the musician Peter Gabriel, and, working with Toh Shimazaki Architects he created a purpose built studio for CGI-based architectural illustration. He was passionate about ongoing education for artists, and a dedicated facility in the building allowed for weekly seminars, which continue to this day. The team quickly grew to 25. The 5000 sq ft studio with its 10m high ceiling and 15m wide projector screen remains a spacious area for clients, and for parties.

== Hayes Davidson ==
The studio was commissioned to illustrate many well known London buildings before they were built or extended, including the London Eye, the Tate Modern, the Millennium Dome (now the O2), the Royal Academy, the Royal Festival Hall and the British Museum. The RIBA collected works by the studio in 2002 for the RIBA drawings collection; some of these images were exhibited in the Architectural galleries of the V&A.

Recognised as experts in the visualisation of architecture and the built environment, the studio gained a reputation for collaborating with many of the world's top architects and designers, including Kengo Kuma, Jean Nouvel and Thomas Heatherwick on projects located around the globe.

Since 2000 the studio has continued to develop its CG based visualisation techniques and by 2015 had produced over 20,000 'virtual' or CGI images since it was founded.

Alan was keen that the studio published its work; by the time of his death, 2 books had been published HD: Hayes Davidson and Hayes Davidson Book Two. In each book, he insisted on thanking all artists past and present as he believed it was collaborative effort which together had produced the work.

He was passionate about London and studied the physiology and psychology of seeing the city, leading to him appearing as an expert witness at public enquiries of major London developments. He rejected what he felt was the pseudo-science of the official London guidelines for the placement of large or tall buildings, instead proposing a human-centric approach based on an understanding of how we actually see, and notice, built form.

Alan led Hayes Davidson's move to employee ownership in 2015. He explained at the time "This change reinforces the truly collaborative nature of a professional architectural visualisation studio. Employee ownership reflects many of the important values already held at Hayes Davidson; of partnership, transparency and mutual support." The Studio operates under a distributed management system. After his diagnosis, Alan started to take a back seat role. The studio celebrates its 30th year in 2019 making it the longest running Architectural Visualisation studio in the UK, and further afield.

== Motor neurone disease ==
Alan was diagnosed with motor neuron disease (MND) in 2012. MND, known as ALS (amyotrophic lateral sclerosis) in the United States, are a group of neurodegenerative disorders that selectively affect motor neurons, the cells which control voluntary muscles of the body. A person's lifetime risk of developing MND is 1 in 300, and it affects up to 5,000 adults in the UK at any one time. On average the disease kills a third of people within a year and more than half within 2 years of diagnosis. To live beyond 5 years is extremely rare. Curiously, many years earlier in the 90’s, Alan donated prize money won from the first competition for the studio’s work to the Motor Neurone Disease Association, despite him not knowing anyone with the disease at the time.

== The Alan Davidson Foundation ==
Alan established a charitable foundation in 2015 and committed the majority of his estate to good causes through the Foundation. https://alandavidsonfoundation.org The Alan Davidson Foundation supports many causes with a particular emphasis on MND research, care for those with disabling neurological conditions and Architectural communication endeavours. In 2020 The Davidson Prize https://www.thedavidsonprize.com was launched by the trustees of the Foundation to further the cause of Architectural communication and innovation. The aim of the prize is to encourage transformative architecture and design of the home. By the time of his death, Alan had donated over £1M to good causes.

Alan was a great believer in education and one of his final wishes was to support a student through university to study architectural visualisation. In September 2021, the foundation set up The Alan Davidson Scholarship with the University of Kent. The scholarship is available to one home-student every year, studying for the MA Architectural Visualisation, this course is the only 1 year-course in the UK specialising solely in architectural visualisation. The £10,000 scholarship is awarded annually to a home-student showing great promise and talent, it covers the university fee and some expenses.
