= Charles Davidson (watercolour painter) =

British watercolour painter

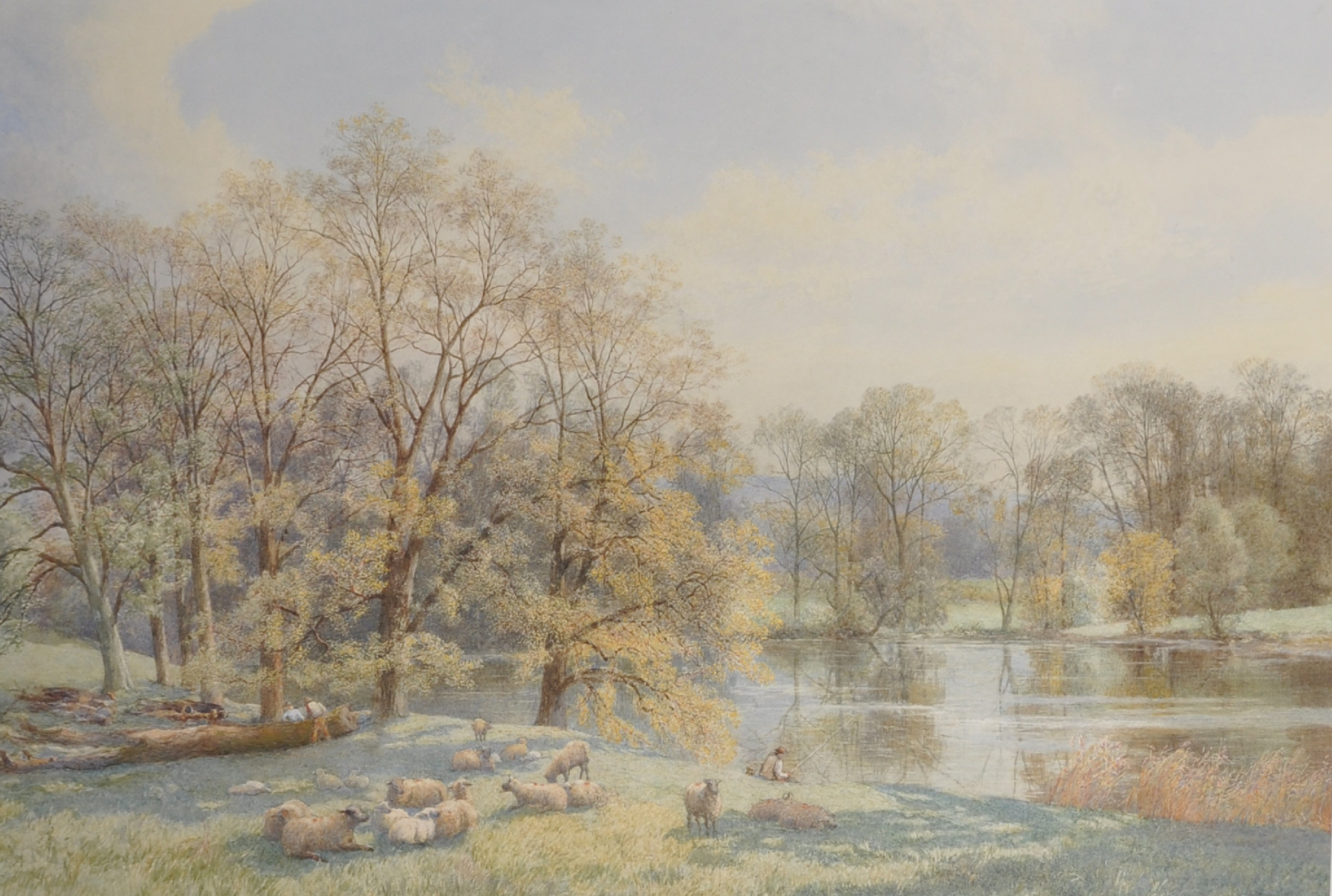
Gatton Park, Surrey, watercolour, 18" x 29"

Charles Grant Davidson (30 July 1824 – 19 April 1902) was a British painter, mainly of landscapes in watercolour.

He is not to be confused with the Scottish-born Charles Davidson Bell (1813-1882), who spent most of his career in the Cape Colony (South Africa) as Surveyor-General, but was also an artist and designer of stamps and heraldry.

== Life ==
Davidson was born in London, of Scottish parents, on 30 July 1824, and was left an orphan at an early age. After education at a school in Chelsea, he apprenticed himself to a seedsman and market-gardener in Brompton.

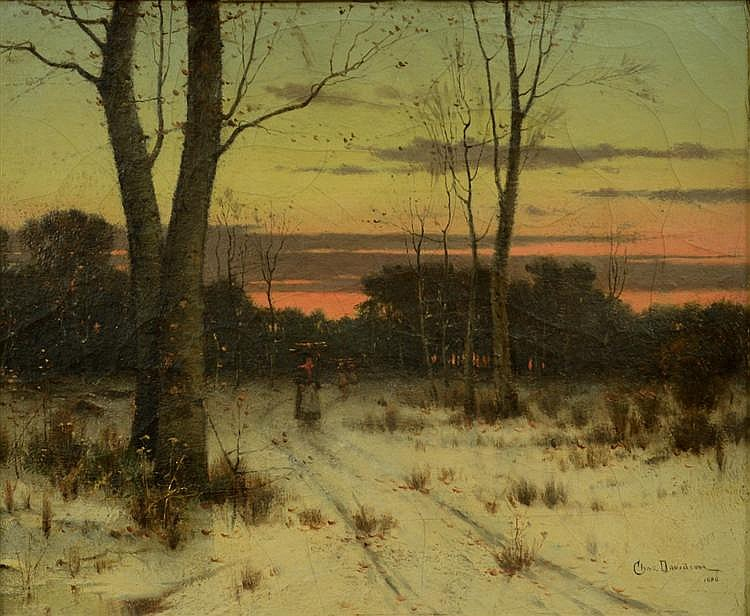
Scene in oils

At the end of a year he left in order to study music, but finally decided on painting, and worked for some years under John Absolon, a member of the New Water Colour Society (now the Royal Institute of Painters in Water Colours). He was himself elected an associate of the society in 1847 and a member in 1849. He resigned his membership in 1853, and on 12 February 1855 was elected an associate of the Old Water Colour Society (now the Royal Watercolour Society); he became a full member on 14 June 1858 and an honorary retired member in 1897.

A friend of John Linnell, Samuel Palmer, and John and Cornelius Varley, Davidson soon established a high reputation. He exhibited from 1844 to 1902 at the Old Water Colour Society (where over 800 of his works appeared), at the New Water Colour Society, the Royal Academy, the British Institution, the Royal Society of British Artists, and elsewhere. His subjects were chiefly typical English landscapes; he also worked a good deal in Wales. His Haymaking at Priory Park, Near Reigate was bought by Prince Albert as a Christmas present for Queen Victoria in 1856.

On 8 December 1842 he married Ann Topham, a sister of the watercolour painter Francis William Topham. They had two sons, one of whom, Charles Topham Davidson, became a landscape painter; and four daughters, one of whom, Annie Laura, married the painter Frank Holl.

Davidson lived for about 28 years in Redhill, Surrey; from 1882 he lived in Falmouth, Cornwall, where in that year he exhibited at the Jubilee Exhibition of the Royal Cornwall Polytechnic Society.

He died in Falmouth on 19 April 1902.
