= Adam Davidson =

Adam Davidson may refer to:

- Adam Davidson (director) (born 1964), American actor and television director
- Adam Davidson (journalist), American radio journalist
- Adam Davidson (tennis), former American tennis player
- Adam Davidson (footballer), Scottish footballer
