= Robert Davison =

Robert Davison may refer to:

- Robert Davison (figure skater) (born 1978), Canadian figure skater
- Rob Davison (born 1980), Canadian ice hockey player
- Bobby Davison (born 1959), English footballer and coach

== See also ==
- Robert Davidson (disambiguation)
