= Chris Davidson (surfer) =

Australian surfer (1978–2022)

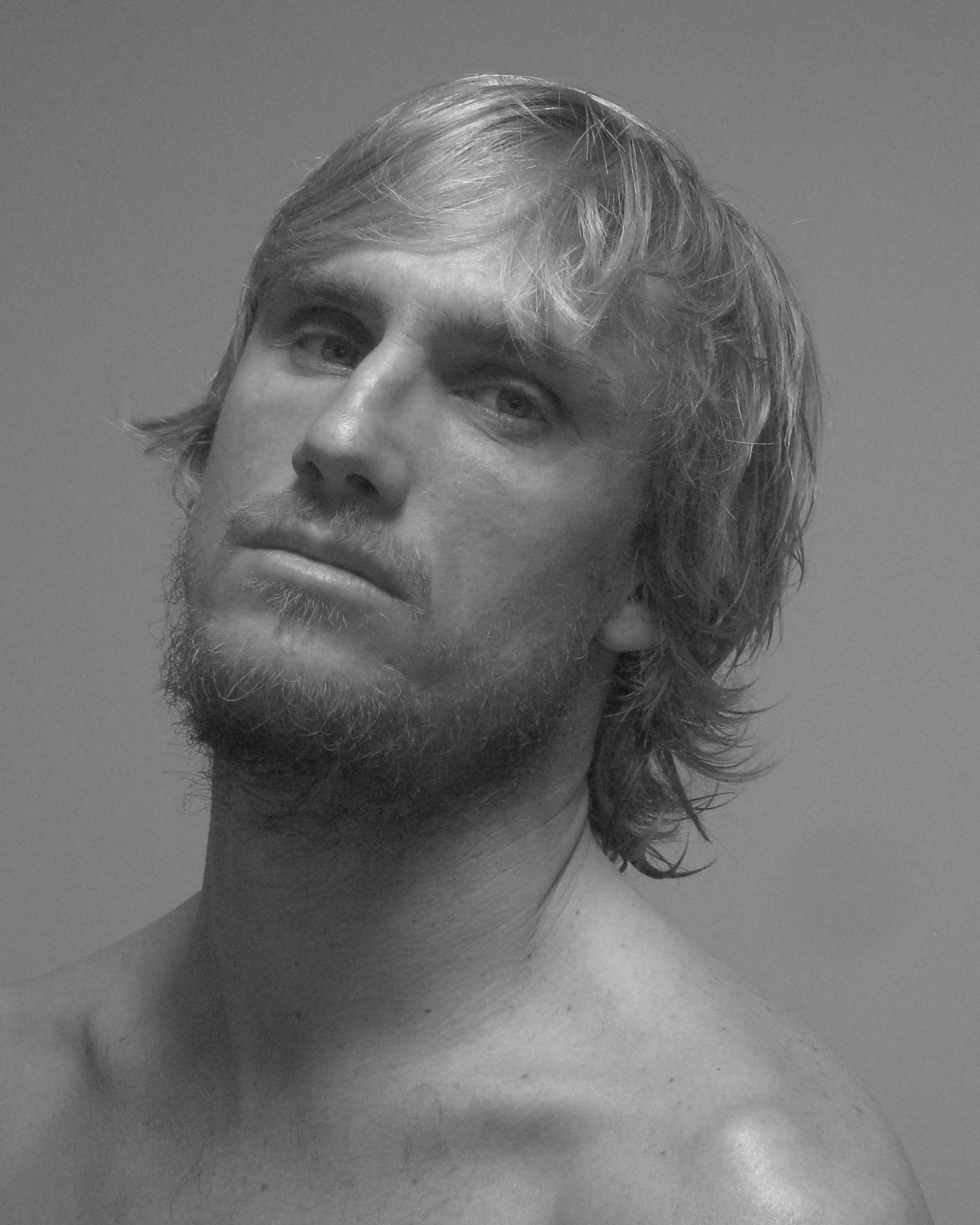
- Davidson in Imbituba, Brazil - July 2009
- Born: 1 January 1978; Sydney, New South Wales, Australia
- Died: 24 September 2022 (aged 44); Kempsey, New South Wales, Australia
- Occupation: Surfer

Chris Davidson (1 January 1978 – 24 September 2022) was an Australian professional surfer.

== Early life and career ==
Davidson grew up in North Narrabeen on the Northern Beaches of Sydney.

Davidson's early career faltered due to injuries, family problems and drugs. In the late 2000s, he turned his career around and won several tournaments.

Davidson competed on the Men's Championship Tour in 2010 and 2011. His best result was third behind Kelly Slater at the 2010 Rip Curl Pro Portugal; he was ranked 14th overall on the 2010 world tour.

== Death ==
On 24 September 2022, Davidson was punched outside South West Rocks Country Club in South West Rocks, New South Wales, causing him to fall to the ground and hit his head on the pavement. He was taken to Kempsey Hospital, where he died a short time later at age 44. A 42-year-old man, Grant Coleman, was later arrested and charged with assault causing death, and refused bail. Coleman pleaded guilty and received a five-year jail sentence.
