= Boris Davison =

Mathematical physicist (1908–1961)

- Born: Boris Borisovich Davison; 7 October 1908; Vasilsursk, Gorky Oblast, Russia
- Died: 24 January 1961 (aged 52); Toronto, Canada
- Education: Leningrad State University; University of Birmingham (PhD)
- Spouse: Olga Hansen (m. 1946)
- Scientific career
- Fields: Mathematical physics; Hydrology; Neutron transport
- Workplaces: State Hydrological Institute; University of Liverpool; University of Birmingham; Montreal Laboratory; Chalk River Laboratory; Atomic Energy Research Establishment; University of Toronto

Boris Davison (7 October 1908 – 24 January 1961) was a Russian-born mathematical physicist.

== Biography ==
Boris Borisovich Davison was born 7 October 1908 in Vasilsursk, Gorky Oblast, Russia. He attended Leningrad State University, graduating in 1931. He then worked at the State Hydrological Institute.

Davison's grandfather had been British, and in 1938 Davison was given a choice – either renounce his British nationality or leave the Soviet Union. He chose to emigrate to the United Kingdom. He then briefly worked with Louis Rosenhead at the University of Liverpool but withdrew from work due to illness.

In 1942 he joined the University of Birmingham's atomic energy research team working under Rudolf Peierls, and in 1944 the university awarded him a PhD.

In 1943 he moved to Canada to work under George Placzek at the Montreal Laboratory of the joint British-Canadian atomic energy project. In October 1945 he briefly joined the British Mission at Los Alamos Laboratory in New Mexico, part of the Manhattan Project which had just developed the atom bomb. In 1946 Davison married Olga Hansen.

He worked at Chalk River Laboratory in Ontario before returning to the UK in 1947 to work at the Atomic Energy Research Establishment at Harwell, Oxfordshire.

In 1953 his security clearance was revoked by the British government because his parents still lived in the Soviet Union, potentially putting Davison at risk of blackmail. He was given a year's leave of absence working at the University of Birmingham. Davison then emigrated to Canada in 1954, where he took up a position at the computation centre at the University of Toronto.

In 1957 he authored the book Neutron Transport Theory.

Davison died suddenly at his home in Toronto on 24 January 1961 at the age of 52.

== Books ==
- Boris, Davison (1957). Neutron Transport Theory. Oxford University Press. ISBN 978-0-19-851207-3.
- Davison, B. (1979). Collected Papers of Boris Davison. Atomic Energy of Canada Limited.
