= Ellis A. Davidson =

- Born: 1828; Hull, United Kingdom
- Died: 9 March 1878 (aged 49–50); London, United Kingdom
- Resting place: Willesden Jewish Cemetery
- Spouse: Catherine Levy (m. 1854)
- Relatives: Abraham Benisch (brother-in-law)

Ellis Abraham Davidson (1828 – 9 March 1878) was a British writer and educationalist. He is considered a pioneer in the teaching of techniques for art study. He was also well known as an art lecturer.

== Biography ==
Ellis A. Davidson was born to a Jewish family in Hull, but at the age of ten moved to London, where his father worked as a chiropodist.

He attended the London School of Design and the School of Art in South Kensington, and was one of the first teachers sent into the provinces by the Science and Art Department to establish schools of art. For several years he taught at the Government School of Arts and Crafts in Chester.

In 1866 Davidson was appointed principal art master of the City Middle Class School, a position which he resigned after six years in order to devote himself more completely to his literary career. As a lecturer, he delivered talks to such organisations as the Teachers' Training Association, the Horological Society, the Grenadier Guards, the London Mechanics' Institute, the Royal Society for the Prevention of Cruelty to Animals, and Jews' College. He also produced a series of models for class teaching of drawing, which were used in government and other schools.

Davidson took an active interest in several communal movements, especially those intended to promote the intellectual development of the adult members of the Jewish industrial classes. He was a committee member for the Association for Providing Free Lectures to Jewish Working Men and Their Families, the Society of Hebrew Literature, the Jewish Association for the Diffusion of Religious Knowledge, and other institutions.

== Partial bibliography ==
- Drawing for Elementary Schools. London: Chapman & Hall. 1857.
- Orthographic and Isometrical Projection. London: Cassell, Petter & Galpin. 1868.
- The Elements of Building Construction and Architectural Drawing. Cassell's technical manuals. London: Cassell, Petter & Galpin. 1869. hdl:2027/gri.ark:/13960/t5dc1tn9v.
- Houses and What They Are Made Of. London: Cassell, Petter & Galpin. 1869.
- Our Bodies. London: Cassell, Petter & Galpin. 1869.
- The Uses of Plants in Food, Arts, and Commerce. London: Cassell, Petter & Galpin. 1869.
- The Animal Kingdom (7th ed.). London: Cassell, Petter & Galpin. 1884 [1870].
- Drawing for Carpenters and Joiners. London: Cassell, Petter & Galpin. 1870.
- Our First Grammar. London: Cassell, Petter & Galpin. 1870.
- Our Food: A Useful Book for Boys and Girls. London: Cassell, Petter & Galpin. 1870.
- The Elements of Practical Perspective. Cassell's technical manuals (7th ed.). London: Cassell & Co. 1884 [1870]. hdl:2027/uiug.30112064210773.
- The Happy Nursery. London: Cassell, Petter & Galpin. 1870.
- Model Drawing. Cassell's technical series (3rd ed.). London: Cassell, Petter & Galpin. n.d. [1871]. hdl:2027/mdp.39015062334092.
- The Boy Joiner and Model Maker. London: Cassell, Petter & Galpin. 1874. hdl:2027/uiug.30112050004677.
- Gothic Stonework: History and Principles of Church Architecture. London: Cassell, Petter & Galpin. 1874.
- The Amateur House-Carpenter. London: Chapman & Hall. 1875. hdl:2027/nnc1.ar52259188.
- A Practical Manual of House-Painting, Graining, Marbling and Sign-Writing. Weale's scientific & technical series (5th ed.). London: Crosby Lockwood & Son. 1888 [1876]. hdl:2027/gri.ark:/13960/t14n13c88.
- The Bible Reader, and Abstract of the Holy Bible. Adapted for the Use of Jewish Schools and Families, with the Addition of Questions on the Text, and Moral Reflections on Each Chapter. London: P. Vallentine. 1877.
- Pretty Arts for the Employment of Leisure Hours. London: Chapman & Hall. 1879. hdl:2027/dul1.ark:/13960/t3qv64x18.
- Linear Drawing. Showing the application of practical geometry to trade and manufactures. London: Cassell & Co. 1899. hdl:2027/uc2.ark:/13960/t58c9x35s.
