= Allan Arthur Davidson =

Australian mining engineer (1873–1930)

Allan Arthur Davidson (26 January 1873 – 7 January 1930) was an Australian mining engineer, prospector and explorer who undertook some of his most notable work in the Northern Territory in his explorations of the Tanami Desert.

== Early life ==
Davidson was the son of James Johnson Davidson and Janet Davidson (née Aitcheson) and he was born in Harrow, Victoria. The journalist James Edward Davidson (1870–1930) was a brother. By 1886 the family had moved to Thackaringa Station, near Broken Hill, where his father had been appointed the manager.

In 1887 Davidson began working in mines nearby and, in 1889 moved to Adelaide where he was employed at the Australian Smelting and Refining Company and later graduated from the Adelaide School of Mines with qualifications in mining and metallurgy.

In the 1890s Davidson travelled frequently and undertook a variety of mining and prospecting work in Kalgoorlie, Mount Pleasant and New Guinea. For the trip to New Guinea, which took place between March and August 1897, he was commissioned by Zebina Lane and, from his exploration, found that the cost of gold mining there would be too high due to the isolation of the goldfields.

== Life in the Northern Territory ==
In 1897 Lane appointed Davidson as the manager of the Central Australian Exploration Company, which is also known as the Central Australian Exploration Syndicate Limited. Davidson and his team departed from Adelaide in November 1897 and spent three years exploring lands between Tennant Creek and Barrow Creek. Their major discovery was The Granites gold mine in the Tanami Desert. It was Davidson who named the Tanami Desert after the Warlpiri language name for the permanent waterholes near his gold find.

Davidson drew accurate and detailed maps of the region, which was previously considered one of 'the largest block of unknown country in Australia', and these were used for many years by other prospectors and mining companies.

During this expedition Davidson also discovered wolframite at Hatches Creek wolfram field but, as they were looking for gold, this discovery was not followed up at the time.

After the completion of their journey Davidson published his 'Journal of explorations in Central Australia / by the Central Australian Exploration Syndicate, Limited, under the leadership of Allan A. Davidson, 1898 to 1900' (1905).

== Later life ==
In 1901, after the completion of this exploration in Central Australia, Davidson spent time mining in West Africa (Nigeria and Ghana) and later also in Chile. During World War I, when travelling between London and Nigeria his ship, the Fullabar, was sunk by a German submarine and he became one of the few survivors. He them returned to London and sold his interests in the Nigerian mining company and established himself as a consulting mining engineer there.

He died in London in 1930.

== Legacy ==
The following locations are named for Davidson:

- Mount Davidson, Tanami Desert (Jarnami).
- Davidson Park, Tennant Creek (Jurnkkurakurr).
- Davidson Street, Alice Springs (Mparntwe).
- Davidson Street, Tennant Creek (Jurnkkurakurr).
