= Alexander Dyce Davidson (professor) =

British academic and surgeon

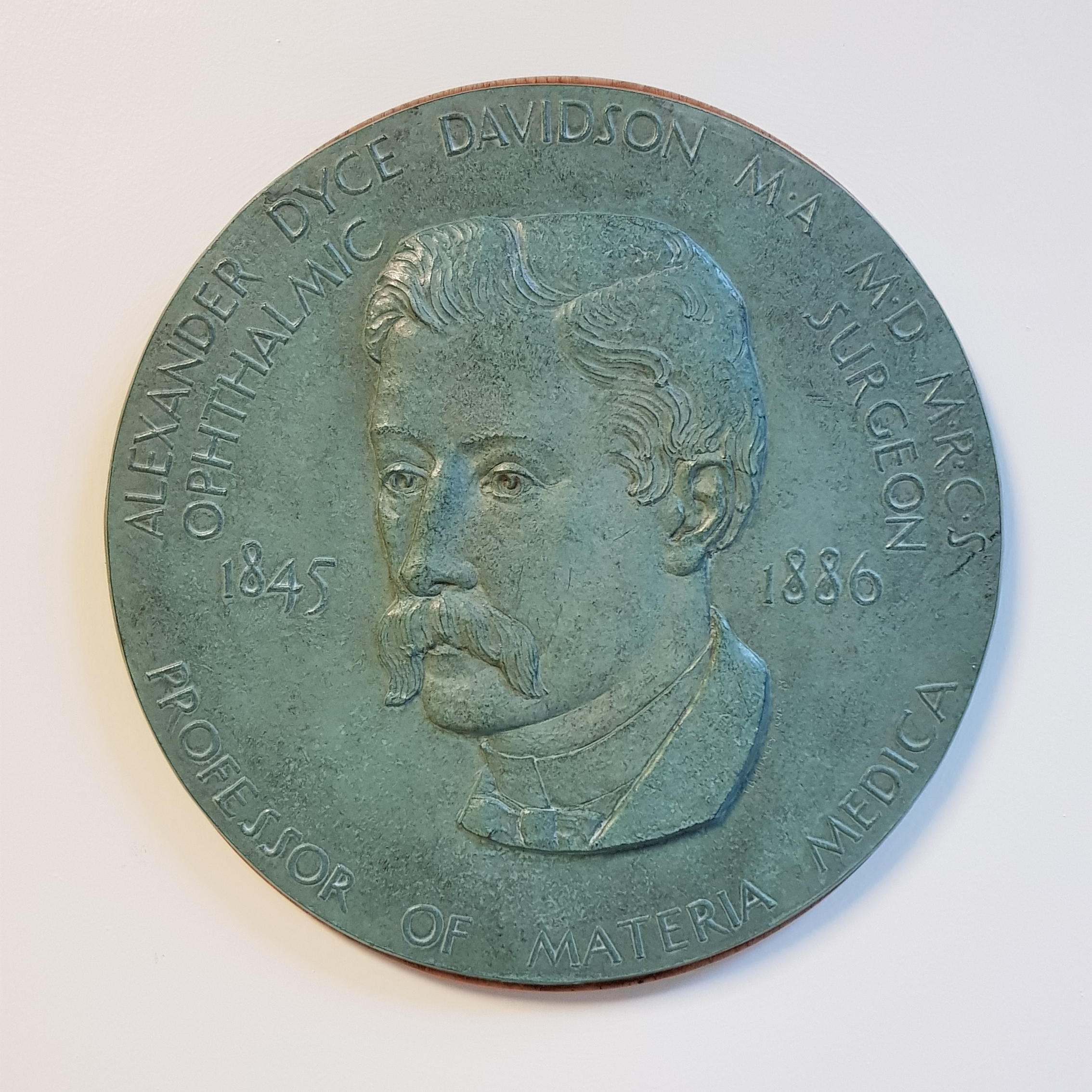
A commemorative plaque to Davidson in Aberdeen Royal Infirmary.

Alexander Dyce Davidson MD FRSE (24 August 1845 – 26 July 1896) was a British academic and surgeon. He was Professor of Materia Medica at Aberdeen University. He was described as a "sweet and amiable character". He specialised in ophthalmic surgery.

== Life ==
Dyce studied Arts and Medicine at Aberdeen University before 18 months of further study in Paris. He studied ophthalmic surgery there under Xavier Galezowski and Louis-Auguste Desmarres. During this period he also acted as externe (external consultant) at several of the Parisian hospitals.

He returned to Scotland around 1860, and was recognized as the foremost ophthalmic surgeon of his day, thereby acquiring a post of senior surgeon at the Blind Asylum in Aberdeen as well as senior surgeon at Aberdeen Royal Infirmary. Aberdeen University then asked him to lecture in Ophthalmic Surgery and Materia Medica (the latter initially under Prof Harvey). In 1878 he succeeded Prof Harvey as Professor of Materia Medica. He accumulated a large collection of ophthalmic instruments from around the globe (largely through correspondence).

He was elected a Fellow of the Royal Society of Edinburgh in 1885. His proposers were Charles Edward Wilson, George Chrystal, Thomas Brown, and Peter Guthrie Tait.

In his latter years he lived at 224 Union Street in the heart of Aberdeen.

He died an hour after an apoplectic attack in front of his students during a lecture on 22 October 1886.
