= Margaret A. Davidson =

American scientist (1950–2017)

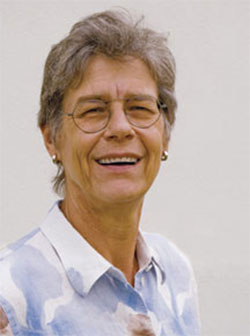
- Born: March 2, 1950; Fort Worth, Texas
- Died: May 23, 2017 (aged 67); Charleston, SC
- Education: Louisiana State University; University of Rhode Island
- Spouse: Karen Stevens
- Scientific career
- Fields: Coastal science and management
- Workplaces: National Oceanic and Atmospheric Administration

Margaret A. Davidson (March 2, 1950 - May 23, 2017) was a coastal management pioneer. She spent most of her career working within the National Oceanic and Atmospheric Administration (NOAA), taking leadership roles that drew from her expertise in climate adaptation, sustainable coastal development, and mitigating risk associated with extreme weather events. Among these roles, Davidson served as senior leader on coastal inundation and resilience for NOAA. She is remembered as a "visionary" in coastal science and management, especially for her capacity to engage communities and consider local social and economic issues while making coastal management decisions.

== Career ==
She started her career in coastal science and management in 1978 with a Juris Doctor from Louisiana State University. Davidson briefly served as special counsel and assistant attorney for the Louisiana Department of Justice. She later earned her master's degree from the University of Rhode Island in marine policy and resource economics. Following this, she joined the South Carolina Sea Grant Consortium where she worked for 16 years, eventually becoming executive director for 13 of those years. In 1995, she joined NOAA as the founding director of the Coastal Services Center. She served as the acting assistant administrator for the NOAA National Ocean Service 2000–2002. From April 2012 to May 2014, she was acting director of the Office of Ocean and Coastal Resource Management, and then oversaw the merging with the Coastal Services Center in 2013 to become what is now the NOAA Office for Coastal Management. In 2014, she became NOAA's Senior Scientific Advisor on Coastal Inundation and Resilience where she evaluated all NOAA coastal inundation efforts.

== Advocacy for climate adaptation ==
Davidson recognized that there was a missing link between science and local decision-making that created an obstacle in climate adaptation. She understood that local political offices were often more concerned with and more capable of preparing for the short-term risk of the next storm, than they were with preparing for the seemingly long-term threat of sea level rise. She invested in efforts to restore local wetlands that provided sea-level rise mitigation and in creating coastal zone risk maps that would effectively communicate the science behind sea-level rise.

Margaret was a stark proponent that good science is a necessary foundation to any management decision or program. She maintained that studies needed to understand coastal inundation risk from the environmental, community, and governance characteristics of the region in order to be successful. This information in tandem with publicized discussions could lead to decisions that reduce future losses to homes, private development, public infrastructure and repetitive losses of government funds.

She spoke to the urgent need to establish policies and initiatives for climate and sea-level rise adaptation, and was not afraid to be critical of the roles federal and state agencies played in this.

== Recognition and awards ==
- Fulbright Scholar at Prince of Songkhla University, Thailand for coastal resource management in 1992
- Nobel Prize for the Intergovernmental Panel on Climate Change and Albert (Al) Gore Jr. in 2007
- Presidential Merit Award in 2002 and 2010
- American Meteorological Society Fellow since 2009
- Gilbert White Fellow
- Zurich Fellow for Climate Adaptation
- NOAA's Administrator Award in 2014
- Coastal and Estuarine Research Foundation's Margaret A. Davidson Stewardship Award - Awarded to individuals that have shown leadership and commitment to the management of estuarine and coastal systems.
- NOAA Margaret A. Davidson Fellowship- Two-year professional development fellowship for graduate students to conduct research and educational outreach at one of the National Estuarine Research Reserves.
- Margaret A. Davidson Coastal Career Development Program - Hosted by The Coastal Society this program is a series of career development workshops for early- and mid-career coastal scientists and managers.

== Personal life ==
Davidson was raised in Fort Worth, Texas. She married her partner of more than 30 years Karen Stevens in the summer of 2013 in Washington D.C.
