= William Mackay Davidson =

Scottish pathologist, haematologist and expert on human chromosomes

Prof William Mackay Davidson FRSE RSM (1909–1991) was a Scottish pathologist, haematologist and expert on human chromosomes.

He was born in Aberdeenshire on 4 September 1909 and was educated at Aberdeen Grammar School. He studied medicine at Aberdeen University and graduated MB ChB in 1934. He began lecturing in pathology at Aberdeen University the following academic year. As a member of the Territorial Army he was immediately called up at the onset of the Second World War in September 1939 and served with the 153rd Field Ambulance attached to the Highland Division. He was Mentioned in Dispatches. In 1940 he was captured at St Valery-en-Caux as part of the famous British surrender to Rommel on the northern French coast. He spent the remainder of the war as a prisoner of war.

After a brief return to Aberdeen University he was offered the post of Senior Lecturer in Haematology at King's College Hospital Medical School in London in 1948 and in 1957 was granted a full Professorship there. In 1957 he was chairman of the symposium on nuclear sex.

In 1964 he was elected a Fellow of the Royal Society of Edinburgh. His proposers were Matthew Sydney Thomson, Cecil Wakeley, David Campbell, Sir Stanley Davidson, George Lightbody Montgomery, and John Stirling Young.

He died on 8 November 1991 in Dunbar.

== Publications ==
- Human Chromosomal Abnormalities (1961)
