= James Edward Davidson =

Newspaper editor

- Born: c. 20 December 1870; Harrow, Victoria, Australia
- Died: 1 June 1930; London, England, United Kingdom
- Other names: J.E.D
- Occupation(s): Newspaper owner, Journalist
- Known for: founder of News Limited

Caricature by David Low

James Edward Davidson (c. 20 December 1870 – 1 June 1930), known in journalistic circles as "J.E.D.", was an Australian journalist who rose through the ranks to become a newspaper owner, the founder of News Limited.

== History ==
He was born at Pine Hills, Harrow, Victoria, the elder son of Janet née Aitchison (c. 1847 – 31 March 1901) and J(ames) Johnstone Davidson, who died in Africa in 1901, where son A. A. Davidson was chairman of West African Mines. and spent much of his youth at Thackaringa Station, New South Wales (near Cockburn, South Australia).

After a period in the Civil Service, he became secretary to the Premier of Western Australia, Lord Forrest.

It was in Western Australia that Davidson, a skilled shorthand writer, commenced his journalistic career, as a reporter on The West Australian. In 1897 he joined the literary staff of the Argus in Melbourne, and after nine years as a reporter he became editor of the Weekly Times. Two years later he accepted the position of general manager and editor-in-chief of the Herald and Weekly Times. After seven years in that post he turned his attention to South Australia, acquiring The Barrier Miner at Broken Hill and the Recorder at Port Pirie, and established an Adelaide afternoon newspaper, in preparation for which, the Mail was purchased. After the News had been launched, another journal was published in Hobart, but failed, and a controlling interest was obtained in the Daily News in Perth.

== Death ==
Davidson left Adelaide in March 1930 on the Naldera to attend the Empire Press Conference in London, where he died suddenly of pneumonia. He was buried at the Putney Vale Cemetery alongside his son Alan.

== Family ==
His brother Allan Arthur Davidson (1873–1930) was a well known mining engineer, and explorer, a graduate of Adelaide's School of Mines.

While manager of the Richmond mine, Kalgoorlie, he discovered the nature and gold content of telluride, previously regarded as valueless. Over two years 1899–1901 he mapped much of Central Australia, and found the Tanami goldfields. He later prospected in Africa, Chile, and Nigeria. When returning to Nigeria from London during the war he was a passenger in the Falaba which was sunk by a U-boat on 28 March 1915, and was one of the 140 survivors. Like his brother, he died suddenly in London, of a heart attack.
Another brother was Thomas Aitchison Davidson, who received his mining diploma in 1904 but nothing further has been found.

He married Eugenie Louise Gilbert (or Jerome-Gilbert) on 6 October 1896. They had two sons:

- Norman Davidson was a journalist with The News.
- Alan Douglas Davidson (15 December 1899 – 24 March 1927) studied at Wesley College, Melbourne, and Melbourne Technical School. He enlisted with the First AIF in January 1918 and was assigned to the Australian Flying Corps, Laverton as trainee pilot and was sent overseas in May 1918. This required his parents' permission as he was not yet 19 years of age. After the war he was promoted to 2nd Lieutenant and served as a pilot instructor at Point Cook, Victoria. He left the Air Corps in 1922 and joined Qantas as a pilot. He and his two passengers, A. W. N. Bell and W. R. Donaldson, were killed when the Qantas plane (Airco DH.9C G-AUED) he was attempting to land at Tambo, Queensland stalled, crashed, and was totally destroyed. This was the first crash involving casualties of a Qantas plane. A mystery surrounds the circumstances of the crash: the plane was two hours late and there were traces of mud on the boots of pilot and passengers, and evidence was later found indicating an unscheduled landing en route.

== Other interests ==
He was a prominent member of Rotary.
