= Davidsen =

Davidsen may refer to:

- Davidsen (name)
- Ida Davidsen, a restaurant in Copenhagen, Denmark
- M. Davidsen (ship), an Icelandic ship

== See also ==
- Davidson (disambiguation)
