= Kayak Bill =

Canadian rock climber (1947–2003)

Bill Davidson
- Born: 1948; Calgary, Alberta, Canada
- Died: 2003 (aged 54–55); Goose Islands, British Columbia, Canada
- Occupations: Rock Climber, Kayaker, artist
- Known for: Big wall climbing, Kayaking,

Bill Davidson (1947–2003) was born on 12 October 1947 in Alberta, Canada, and grew up in an orphanage. Bill was a pioneer in the Canadian rock climbing-scene during the 1970s. After an early free ascent of the North America Wall of El Capitan, Yosemite National Park, in 1970, Bill returned to his native Alberta where he introduced extreme climbing to the Canadian Rockies. Around 1975, Bill suffered a near-fatal fall and left the climbing scene. On a visit to British Columbia, he purchased a green and white double Frontiersman kayak, reduced his belongings to what he could carry with him, and traveled the north coast of British Columbia establishing campsites on many remote islands. "Kayak" Bill often spent winters in Sointula on Malcolm Island where he became a self-taught "outsider" artist—painting fanciful watercolors during the winter months and selling his paintings to purchase supplies for his kayaking travels.

Kayak Bill Davidson died in December 2003, while camping in the Goose Islands group near Hakai, British Columbia. He made daily journal entries and on 6 December he mentioned experiencing "lower back & stomach pains". His last entry was made the next day on 7 December. It is believed that he died on 8 December 2003. Bill is survived by one son, Westerly Davidson. He is also survived by both of his sisters (Diane and Joanne) and Joanne’s children (Sherry, Allen, Carl and Kristina)(a.

== In books ==
- Pullan, Brandon (October 2021). To Be a Warrior: The Adventurous Life and Mysterious Death of Billy Davidson. Rocky Mountain Books. ISBN 978-1771604376.

== In media ==
A rare video interview with Bill Davidson, filmed in the 1990's and uploaded by the Calgary Mountain Club: https://www.youtube.com/watch?v=3JSYyUjVVnE

== Notable ascents ==
- 1970 North America Wall of El Capitan, Yosemite, CA, USA.
- 1971 Wakonda Buttress of Yamnuska, Kananaskis, AB, Canada.
- 1971 North Face of Gibraltar Mountain, Kananaskis Country, Alberta, Canada.
- 1972 CMC Wall on Yamnuska, Kananaskis, AB, Canada.
- 1974 Yellow Edge on Yamnuska, Kananaskis, AB, Canada.
