= Will Davidson =

Scottish footballer

William R. Davidson
Personal information
- Place of birth: Scotland
- Position: Half back

Senior career*
Years	Team	Apps	(Gls)
1893–1895	Newton Heath	41	(2)
- * Club domestic league appearances and goals

William R. Davidson was a Scottish footballer. His regular position was as a half back. He played for Annbank and Manchester United. When Davidson joined the team in 1893, Manchester United was still known as Newton Heath Football Club and struggling to stay in Football League First Division. Davidson kicked the winning goal in one of the team's few wins in the 1893–94 season, against Wolverhampton Wanderers on 11 November 1893. His final appearance was on 1 December 1894 against Crewe Alexandra F.C., as a serious injury forced him to retire from playing football.

However, this was not the end of Davidson's relationship with Newton Heath or Manchester United. Davidson scouted Alex Bell, then playing for Ayr Parkhouse F.C., leading to Bell's transfer to Manchester United in January 1903. Bell appeared in 309 games for Manchester United, with two League titles and an FA Cup.
