= Willie G. Davidson =

American motorcycle designer

William Godfrey Davidson
- Born: June 20, 1933 (age 93)
- Other name: Willie G. Davidson
- Occupation: Motorcycle designer
- Known for: Chief Styling Officer for Harley-Davidson
- Relatives: William H. Davidson, father William A. Davidson, grandfather

William Godfrey "Willie G." Davidson (born 1933) is an American businessman and motorcycle designer, and the former senior vice president & chief styling officer of Harley-Davidson Motor Company. He was also the head of Harley-Davidson's Willie G. Davidson Product Development Center in Wauwatosa, Wisconsin. While being generally responsible for approving Harley-Davidson motorcycle designs, he also personally designed several motorcycles for Harley-Davidson, including the Super Glide and the Low Rider, which pioneered the factory custom motorcycle and created an intermediate line of motorcycles between their large touring models and their smaller Sportsters.

== Early life ==
Willie G. Davidson is the son of former Harley-Davidson president William H. Davidson and the grandson of co-founder William A. Davidson. Consequently, he grew up around Harley-Davidson motorcycles. Davidson graduated from the University of Wisconsin–Madison and went on to study at the Art Center College of Design in Pasadena, California.

Before working for Harley-Davidson, Davidson worked for the design department of Ford Motor Company.

== At Harley-Davidson ==
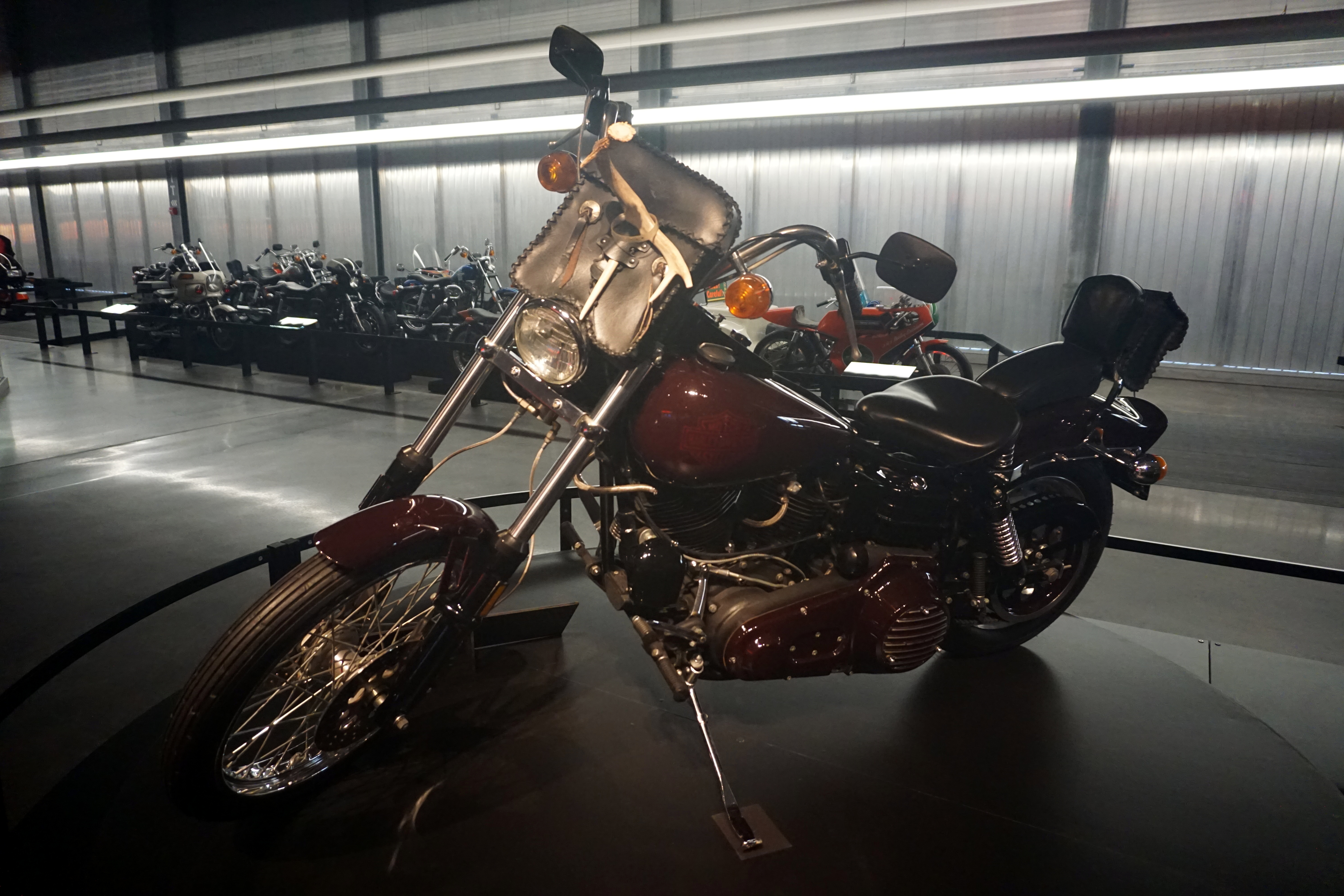
Willie G. Davidson's 1980 Harley-Davidson Custom Belt-Drive FXWG at the Harley-Davidson Museum

Davidson joined the design department of Harley-Davidson in 1963. In 1969 he was promoted to Vice President of Styling. His designs during the 1970s included the 1971 FX Super Glide, the 1977 FXS Low Rider, and the 1977 XLCR Sportster-based cafe racer.

Willie was one of the Harley-Davidson executives who joined Vaughn Beals in buying Harley-Davidson from parent company American Machine and Foundry in 1981.

On March 16, 2012, it was announced that Willie G. would retire from Harley-Davidson on April 30, 2012. He is to remain involved as brand ambassador, and in Special Design Projects as Chief Styling Officer Emeritus.
