= William Davidson (cricketer, born 1920) =

English cricketer

Bill Davidson
Personal information
- Full name: William Watkins Davidson
- Born: 20 March 1920; Poplar, London, England
- Died: 26 May 2015 (aged 95); Cirencester, Gloucestershire, England
- Batting: Right-handed
- Role: Wicket-keeper

Domestic team information
- Years: Team
- 1956: Marylebone Cricket Club
- 1948–1951: Sussex
- 1947–1948: Oxford University

Career statistics
Competition	First-class
Matches	22
Runs scored	118
Batting average	6.94
100s/50s	–/–
Top score	31
Balls bowled	–
Wickets	–
Bowling average	–
5 wickets in innings	–
10 wickets in match	–
Best bowling	–
Catches/stumpings	34/6
- Source: Cricinfo, 15 March 2012

William Watkins Davidson (20 March 1920 – 26 May 2015) was an English cricketer.

Bill Davidson was born at Poplar, London, and was educated at Brighton College before going up to Wadham College, Oxford, to study theology. In the Second World War he served in the Army in Burma and Malaya.

A wicket-keeper and tail-end right-handed batsman, Davidson made his first-class debut for Oxford University Cricket Club against Gloucestershire in 1947. He made fifteen further first-class appearances for the university, the last of which came against Cambridge University at The University Match at Lord's in 1948. In his sixteen first-class appearances for the university, Davidson scored 65 runs at an average of 6.50, with a high score of 18 not out. Behind the stumps he took 22 catches and made 5 stumpings.

In 1948 Davidson made his first-class debut for Sussex against Essex in the County Championship. He made four further first-class appearances for the county, the last of which came against Gloucestershire in the 1951 County Championship. In his five first-class matches for Sussex, he scored 21 runs at an average of 4.20, with a high score of 7. Behind the stumps, he took 12 catches and made a single stumping. He later made a first-class appearance for the Marylebone Cricket Club against Oxford University in 1956, making his highest first-class score of 31 in the MCC's first innings.

After retiring from cricket he was ordained. He became a naval chaplain and was later a vicar in parishes in Surrey and Westminster. He died on 26 May 2015.
