= William H. Davidson (motorcyclist) =

William Herbert Davidson
- Born: September 2, 1905
- Died: May 18, 1992 (aged 87); Elm Grove, Wisconsin
- Education: University of Wisconsin–Madison
- Occupations: President of Harley-Davidson, 1942–1971
- Relatives: William A. Davidson, father Willie G. Davidson

William Herbert Davidson (September 2, 1905 – May 18, 1992, Elm Grove, Wisconsin) was president of Harley-Davidson Motorcycles from 1942 to 1971. His father, William A. Davidson (1870–1937), was one of the company founders and his sons, John A. Davidson (1935–2019) was a company president and Willie G. Davidson was a company vice-president.

In 1930, Davidson won the AMA National Enduro Champion title.

Davidson was inducted to the Motorcycle Hall of Fame in 1999.
