= Alex Davidson (Australian footballer) =

Australian rules footballer

Personal information
- Full name: Alex M. Davidson
- Born: 12 August 1876
- Died: 12 July 1951 (aged 74)
- Original team: Albion United

Playing career^{1}
Years	Club	Games (Goals)
1896	Fitzroy (VFA)	7 (0)
1897–1898	Fitzroy	4 (0)
- ^{1} Playing statistics correct to the end of 1898.

Alex M. Davidson (12 August 1876 – 12 July 1951) was an Australian rules footballer who played for the Fitzroy Football Club in the Victorian Football League (VFL).

Early in the 1898 season he moved to North Melbourne in the Victorian Football Association.
