= William Leslie Davidson =

Scottish philosopher

- Born: 1848; Old Rayne, Scotland
- Died: 1929 (aged 80–81); Aberdeen, Scotland

Education
- Education: Aberdeen University

William Leslie Davidson (1848–1929) was a Scottish philosopher.

== Early life ==
Davidson was born and raised in Old Rayne, a village in the north-east of Scotland, near Aberdeen.

He was educated at Aberdeen University before embarking on a career and life dedicated to philosophy.

During the First World War, Davidson fought as a colonel in the Royal Field Artillery.

== Death ==
Davidson died in Aberdeen in 1929.

== Quotes ==
He is known for coining the following quote from his book Recent Theistic Discussion:

A mind not wholly wishful to reach the truth, or to rest it in or obey it when found, is to that extent a mind impervious to truth an incapable of unbiased belief.

== Selected publications ==
- The Logic of Definition: Explained and Applied, Longmans, London, 1885.
- Theism As Grounded in Human Nature: Historically and Critically Handled. Being the Burnett Lectures for 1892, Longmans, Green, London, 1893.
- The Stoic Creed, T. & T. Clark, Edinburgh, 1907.
- Leading and Important English Words: Explained and Exemplified. An Aid to Teaching, Longmans, London, 1909.
- Political Thought in England: The Utilitarians from Bentham to Mill, Williams and Norgate, London, 1915. (Home University Library of Modern Knowledge)
- Recent Theistic Discussion, T. & T. Clark, Edinburgh, 1921.
