= Ogunlade Davidson =

Sierra Leonean scientist (1949–2022)

- Born: May 26, 1949
- Died: October 8, 2022 (aged 73)
- Citizenship: Sierra Leone
- Occupations: Climatologist, Scientist, Politician, Minister

Ogunlade Davidson (26 May 1949 – 8 October 2022) was a Sierra Leonean scientist who was co-chair of the Working Group III, Intergovernmental Panel on Climate Change from 1997 until 2001, during the 4th Assessment Report. He was also an IPCC Vice-chair from 2008 to 2014. From 1996 to 2000, he held the post of Dean of the Faculty of Engineering, Fourah Bay College, University of Sierra Leone.

Davidson was appointed Minister of Energy and Water Resources of Sierra Leone during the Ernest Bai Koroma Administration.

Davidson died on 8 October 2022, at the age of 73.
