= William Davidson (cricketer, born 1811) =

English cricketer

William Davidson (1811 – 12 May 1894) was an English cricketer with amateur status who was active from 1832 to 1837. He was born in England and died in Welwyn, Hertfordshire. He made his debut in 1832 and appeared in four matches as an unknown handedness batsman whose bowling style is unknown, playing for Marylebone Cricket Club (MCC) and an England Eleven. He scored 22 runs with a highest score of 9* and took no wickets.

== Bibliography ==
- Haygarth, Arthur (1862). Scores & Biographies, Volume 2 (1827–1840). Lillywhite.
