= Thomas Davison =

British radical journalist and printer-publisher (1794–1826)

Thomas Davison (1794 – 1826) was a British radical journalist and printer-publisher of a series of journals, including Medusa, the London Alfred, the Deist's Magazine, as well as the James Griffin-edited Cap of Liberty and the Robert Shorter-edited Theological Comet.

Known for his republican and Deist views, Davison actively supported Richard Carlile in his battle with the British establishment of the time, which resulted in Carlile's imprisonment on charges of blasphemous libel in October 1819.

Davison's publication of material critical of the Bible in the Deist's Magazine resulted in his own prosecution. Found guilty of blasphemy like Carlile after his trial in October 1820, Davison was fined £100 and imprisoned for two years. Reduced to poverty in his last years, he eked out a living as a bookseller following his release in 1822.
