= Jim Davidson (bandleader) =

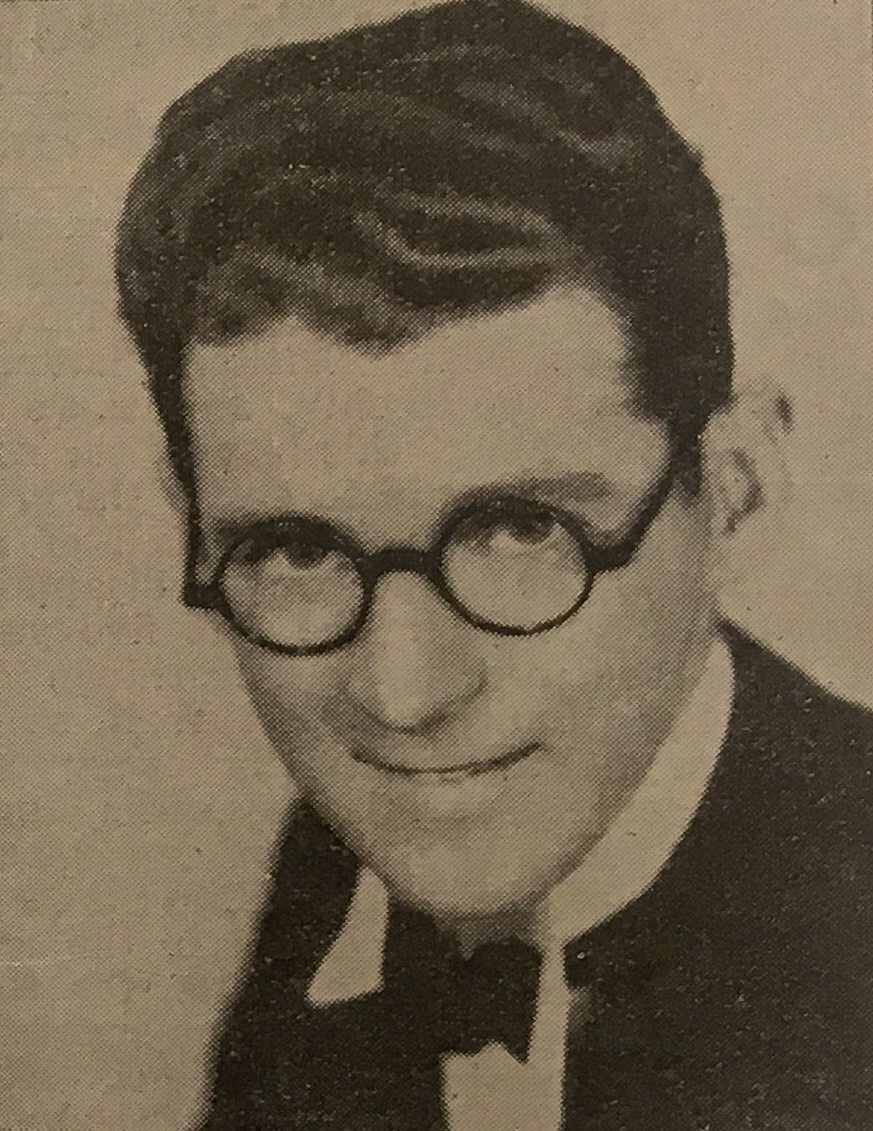
- Jim Davidson circa 1937

Background information
- Also known as: Jim Davidson
- Born: James Hutchinson Davidson; August 6, 1902; Sydney, New South Wales, Australia
- Died: April 10, 1982 (aged 79) Bowral, New South Wales, Australia
- Genres: jazz
- Instruments: cornet, drums

James "Jim" Hutchinson Davidson (1902-1982), was an Australian bandleader and jazz musician who rose to prominence as the leader of the ABC Dance Band in the 1930s before becoming a senior executive for the BBC in England from 1947 to 1963.

== Early life ==
James Davidson was born in Sydney, Australia. He grew up in Birchgrove, New South Wales and began playing brass instruments in 1917 with the Compulsory Military Training Band. After leaving school at 14, he began playing drums as part of cinema pit ensembles and dance bands.

== Career ==
Davidson joined Jimmy Elkins's dance orchestra in the mid-1920s, and remained a member until it disbanded in 1928. He continued to play at the Ambassadors restaurant until it was destroyed by fire in 1931. In August 1932, he performed a significant concert at Hillier's Café, which is often cited as the first jazz concert held in Sydney. By 1933, his band was performing at the Palais Royal dance hall, attracting crowds of 10,000 people per week.

In 1936, Davidson enlarged his orchestra after signing a contract with the Australian Broacasting Commission (ABC). The band sunsequently began performing nationally on ABC Radio as Jim Davidson’s ABC Dance Band. Columbia Records released hundreds of records of his performances, and between 1937 and 1939 his ABC band made three interstate tours.

Davidson joined the Australian Imperial Force (AIF) in 1941 and formed the Army Entertainment Group which led variety shows troops in the Middle East and the South-West Pacific areas during World War II. Jim Gussey took over as conductor of the ABC Dance Band.

After the war, Davidson applied unsuccessfully for the position of Director of Light Entertainment at the ABC. In 1948 he was appointed Assistant Head of Variety and Musical Productions at the BBC, and moved to England. He was responsible for supporting programs such as The Goon Show. He retired in September 1963 and returned to Australia in 1964. After finding limited opportunities in broadcasting, Davidson worked with his wife in house renovation and gardening.

== Personal life ==
Davidson's first marriage was to Gertrude Madeline Kitching in 1928; they divorced in 1935. Davidson married Marjorie McFarlane, an artist, on 7 June 1935. They lived in Melbourne until they moved to England in 1948. Upon moving back to Australia, the couple returned to New South Wales.

Davidson died on 10 April 1982 in Bowral, New South Wales. Prior to his death, he had been working on a memoir which was published posthumously as A Showman’s Story in 1983.
