= David (name) =

Male given name

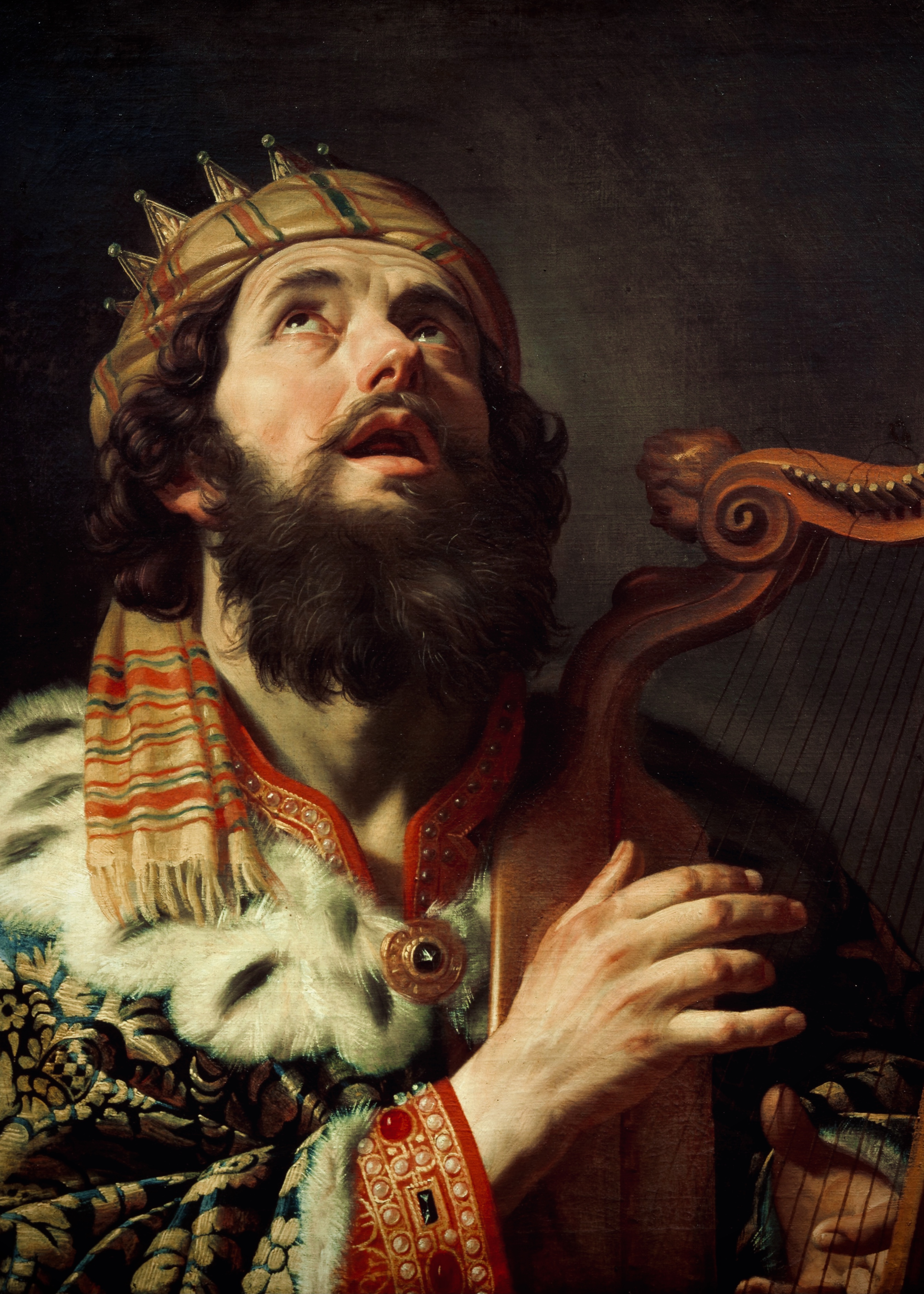
- 17th-century portrait of David by Gerard van Honthorst
- Pronunciation: /ˈdeɪvɪd/ DAY-vid
- Gender: Male

Origin
- Origin: Hebrew
- Meaning: "beloved" "uncle"

Other names
- Nicknames: Dave, Davey, Davy
- Related names: Davidson, Davies, Davis, Dawson, Davison, Davids, Dawes

David is a common masculine given name of Hebrew origin. Its popularity derives from the initial oral tradition (Oral Torah) and recorded use related to King David, a central figure in the Tanakh, and foundational to Judaism, and subsequently significant in the religious traditions of Christianity and Islam.

== Etymology ==
David (Hebrew: דָּוִד, Modern: David, Tiberian: Dāwîḏ) means 'beloved', derived from the root dôwd (דּוֹד), which originally meant 'to boil', but survives in Biblical Hebrew only in the figurative usage 'to love'; specifically, it is a term for an uncle or figuratively, a lover/beloved (it is used in this way in the Song of Songs 6:3 (Shir HaShirim), Ani L'Dodi V'Dodi Li, אני לדודי ודודי לי, 'I am for my beloved and my beloved is for me') as written by King Solomon. In Christian tradition, the name was adopted as Syriac: ܕܘܝܕ Dawid, Greek Δαυίδ, Latin Davidus or David. The Quranic spelling is دَاوُۥد Dāwūd or Dā'ūd.

David was adopted as a Christian name from an early period, e.g. David of Wales (6th century), David Saharuni (7th century), David I of Iberia (9th century). Name days are celebrated on 8 February (for David IV of Georgia), 1 March (for St. David of Wales) and 29 December (for King David), as well as 25 June (St. David of Sweden), 26 June, 9 July (Russia), 26 August, 11 December and 30 December (Hungary, Latvia, Norway, Czech Republic).

== Hypocorisms ==
The oldest, most popular and most commonly used diminutive form in the English speaking countries of David is Dav, which first appeared in written form in the 16th century. The nickname Dav or Dave has been used as a name in its own right in the 19th and 20th centuries, at least in the United States. At the height of its popularity in the 1950s and early 1960s, the name Dave was bestowed upon more than 3,000 infants each year.

Common English-language hypocorisms of the name David are Dave, Dav, Davey, Davie, Davo, Davs, Davis, Daviey, and Davy. The Welsh Dafydd is also abbreviated Dewi, Dai and Daf.

In Ashkenazi Jewish culture, common hypocorisms of Dovid are Dovi and Dov. Dudi is a common hypocorism in Modern Hebrew.

== Surnames ==
A number of surnames are derived from the name.

- Patronymic surnames:
  - Celtic: Davies, McDaid, McDevitt
  - Germanic (native): Daveson, Davids, Davidsen, Davidson, Davidsson, Davison, Davson, Dawson
  - Slavic and derived: Davidenko, Davidoff, Davidov, Davidović, Davidovici, Davidovich/Davidovitch, Davidyuk/Davydyuk/Давидюк, Dawidowski, Davidovsky, Dawidowicz, Davidavičius, Davidovičius, Davidovs, Davydau/Davydaw Davydov
  - Other languages: Davidyan/Davidian, Davidoglu, Davidopoulos, Davidescu, Davitashvili, Tavitian/Tavityan
- Other: Davey, David, Davide, Davidis, Dawes, Dovydaitis

== Statistics ==
- United Kingdom: David was the most popular masculine given name in Northern Ireland for newborns in 1975 and dropped to a fluctuating rank around 20th in the first few years of the 21st century.
- United States: David is the fifth most popular masculine name in the United States, belonging to 2,967,000 individuals.

== See also ==
- List of people with given name David
- Davide
- Dave (given name)
- Davy (given name)
- Kawika
