= Dave (given name) =

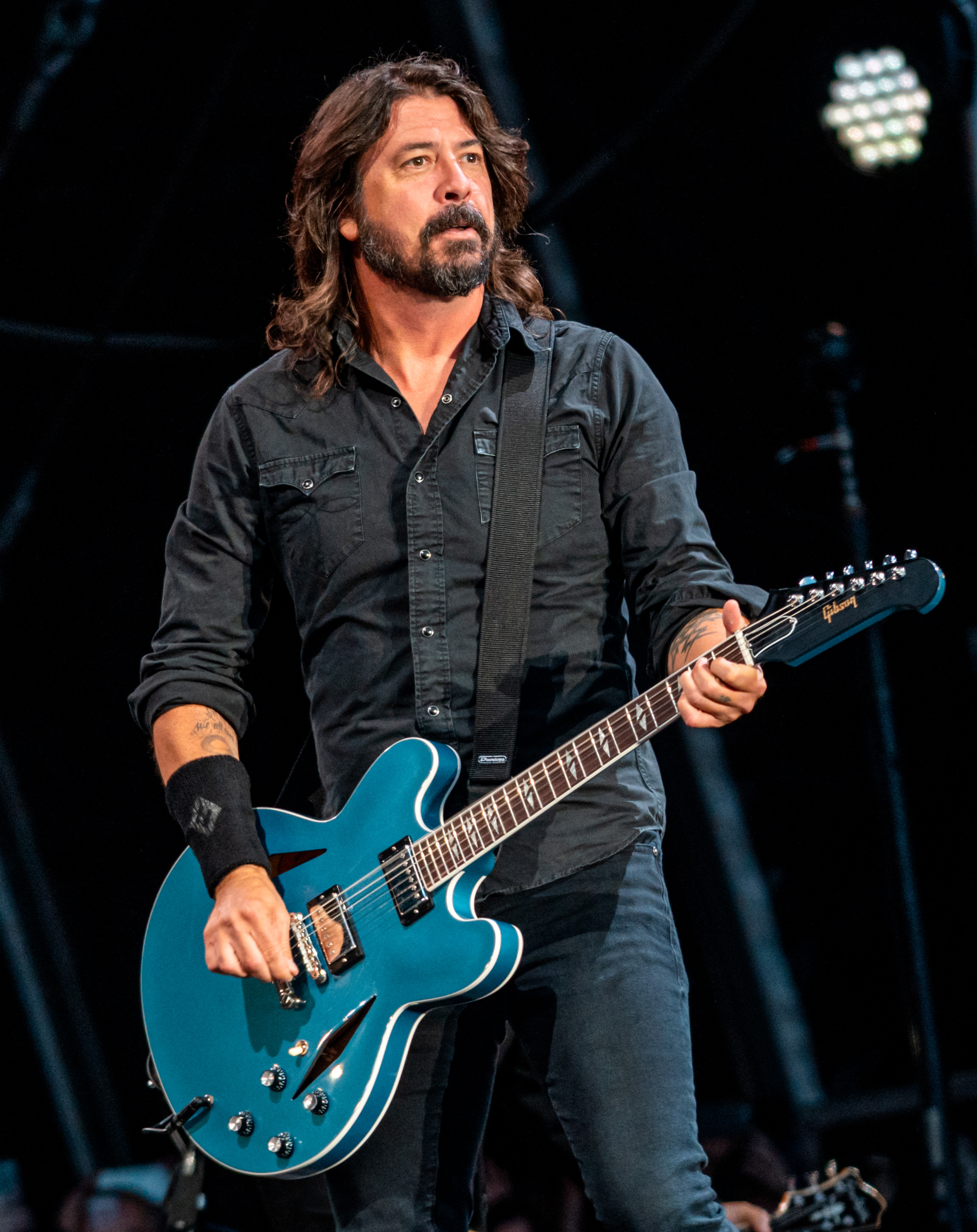
- Dave Grohl in 2019
- Pronunciation: /deɪv/ DAYV
- Gender: Male
- Language: English

Origin
- Languages: 1. Hebrew; 2. Latin; 3. English
- Origin: Diminutive form of David
- Region of origin: English-speaking world

Other names
- Alternative spelling: Davey; Davy; Davie
- Related names: David, Davey

Dave is a given name, often a shortened form of the names David, Davey, or others. The name means "beloved".

Notable people with the name include:

== People ==
- Dave (American rapper), aka David Jolicoeur (1968–2023), of the hip hop group De La Soul
- Dave (artist) (born 1969), Swiss artist, born David Pflugi
- Dave (rapper) (born 1998), English rapper, born David Omoregie
- Dave (singer) (born 1944), Dutch-born French singer, born Wouter Otto Levenbach
- Dave Adolph (1937–2017), American football coach
- Dave Allen (comedian) (1936–2005), Irish comedian
- Dave Atkins (disambiguation), multiple people
- Dave Bailey (musician) (1926–2023), American jazz drummer
- Dave Bailey (runner), Canadian track and field athlete, later a pharmacologist
- Dave Bancroft (1891–1972), American baseball player and manager
- Dave Barker, professional name of Jamaican musician David Crooks
- Dave Barney, American educator and swimming coach
- Dave Barry, American comedian and humor author
- Dave Bautista, American actor and former professional wrestler
- Dave Bayley, British songwriter, singer and producer
- Dave Billes (1938–2024), Canadian racing driver
- Dave Bristol (born 1933), American baseball manager
- Dave Brown (disambiguation), multiple people
- Dave Brubeck (1920–2012), American jazz musician
- Dave Boat, American voice actor
- Dave Burba (born 1966), American baseball player
- Dave Butterfield (born 1954), American football player
- Dave Butz (1950–2022), American football player
- Dave Campo (born 1947), American football coach
- Dave Canales (born 1981), American football coach
- Dave Chappelle, American stand-up comedian, satirist and actor
- Dave Chisnall, English darts player
- Dave Clark (disambiguation), multiple people
- Dave Colclough, Welsh professional poker player
- Dave Concepción (born 1948), Venezuelan baseball player
- Dave Coulier, American stand-up comedian and television/voice actor
- Dave Coursol (born 1994), Canadian racing driver
- Dave Cousins (1945–2025), English musician, leader, singer and songwriter of "Strawbs"
- Dave Dalby (1950–2002), American football player
- Dave Dravecky (born 1956), American baseball player and motivational speaker
- Dave Edwards (disambiguation), multiple people
- Dave Finlay Sr. (born 1936), Northern Irish professional wrestler
- Dave 'Fit' Finlay (born 1958), Northern Irish professional wrestler
- Dave Flint (born 1971), American ice hockey coach
- Dave Foggin, member of the West Virginia House of Delegates
- Dave Foutz (1856–1897), American baseball player and manager
- Dave Franco, American television and film actor
- Dave Frederick, American sportswriter and coach
- Dave Freeman (American author) (1961–2008), American author
- Dave Freeman (British writer), British film and television writer
- Dave Gahan, English singer
- Dave Garcia (1920–2018), American baseball manager
- Dave Garnett (born 1970), American football player
- Dave Gerlach (1940–2020), Canadian curler
- Dave Gettleman (born 1951), American football executive
- Dave Gibbons, British writer and artist of comics
- Dave Goelz, American puppeteer known for playing Gonzo on The Muppets
- Dave Gorman, English stand-up comedian, best known for his project Are You Dave Gorman?
- Dave Grayson (1939–2017), American football player
- Dave Grohl, American rock musician and member of Nirvana and the Foo Fighters
- Dave Guard (1934–1991), American folk singer and songwriter, founding member of The Kingston Trio
- Dave Hanner (1930–2008), American football player and coach
- Dave Henderson (1958–2015), American baseball player
- Dave Houpapa (born 1981), New Zealand cricketer
- Dave Hoyda (1957–2015), Canadian ice hockey player
- Dave Huismans (born 1979), Dutch musician known professionally as 2562
- Dave James (racing driver) (1928–1987), American racing driver
- Dave Kaye (1906–1996), British pianist
- Dave Keuning, American rock musician and member of The Killers
- Dave Kingman (born 1948), American baseball player
- Dave Koz, American jazz saxophonist
- Dave Krieg (born 1958), American football player
- Dave Lombardo, drummer for heavy metal bands Slayer and Fantômas
- Dave Lutz (born 1959), American football player
- Dave Mackintosh, drummer for power metal band DragonForce
- Dave Magadan (born 1962), American baseball player
- Dave Malarcher (1894–1982), American baseball player and manager
- Dave Marshall (musician), American guitarist
- Dave Martinez (born 1964), American baseball player and manager
- Dave Matthews, American jam musician
- Dave McCormick (born 1965), American politician and businessman
- Dave McCurry (1951–2020), American football player
- Dave McGinnis (born 1951), American football coach and broadcaster
- Dave Means (born 1952), American football player
- Dave Meyers (basketball) (1953–2015), American basketball player
- Dave Miley (born 1962), American baseball manager
- Dave Minor (1922–1998), American basketball player
- Dave Murray (musician), guitarist for heavy metal band Iron Maiden
- Dave Mustaine, singer/guitarist/founder of American heavy metal band Megadeth
- Dave Myers (American football) (1906–1997), American football player
- Dave Myers (baseball) (born 1959), American baseball player, manager and scout
- Dave Myers (presenter) (1957–2024), English television presenter and chef
- Dave Newhouse (born 1953), American musician
- Dave Nilsson (born 1969), Australian baseball player and manager
- Dave Orr (1859–1915), American baseball player
- Dave Parker (disambiguation), multiple people
  - Dave Parker (1951–2025), American baseball player
- Dave Parkin (born 1956), American football player
- Dave Polsky, American television screenwriter
- Dave Portnoy (born 1977), American businessman and social media personality
- Dave Ragone (born 1979), American football player and coach
- Dave Ramsey, American personal finance advisor, radio show host, author, and businessman
- Dave Roberts (disambiguation), multiple people
- Dave Robinson (disambiguation), multiple people
- Dave Rozumek, American football player
- Dave Rubin (born 1976), American political commentator, YouTube personality, and talk show host
- Dave Saunders (volleyball) (born 1960), American volleyball player
- Dave Severin, American politician
- Dave Shimizu, Guamanian politician
- Dave Stewart (disambiguation), multiple people
- Dave Stieb (born 1957), American baseball player
- Dave Szott (born 1967), American football player
- Dave Thomas (businessman) (1932–2002), American businessman, founder of Wendy's
- Dave Tucker (geologist), American geologist and IWW leader
- Dave Ulliott, English professional poker player
- Dave Yaras, American mobster
- Dave Valentin (1952–2017), American Latin jazz flautist
- Dave Green (born 1983), American film and music video director
- Dave Van Horn, American head baseball coach of the Arkansas Razorbacks
- Dave Walker (born 1945), British musician
- Dave Wannstedt (born 1952), American football coach
- Dave Waymer (1958–1993), American football player
- Dave Weckl, American drummer
- Dave Welch (poker player), English professional poker player
- Dave Whatley (1927–2015), American street performer and local celebrity, better known as Dancin' Dave
- Dave Whinham (born 1957), American football coach
- Dave Winfield (born 1951), American baseball player
- Dave Winfield (footballer) (born 1988), English footballer
- Dave Wommack (born 1956), American football coach
- Dave Ziegler (born 1977), American football executive

== Fictional characters ==
- Dave (EastEnders), from the British soap opera EastEnders
- D.A.V.E., from The Batman television series
- David Bowman (Space Odyssey), in the book and movie 2001: A Space Odyssey
- Dave Lister, from the BBC comedy series Red Dwarf
- David "Dave" Lizewski, the title character and the protagonist of the Kick-Ass series
- Dave Turner, in the television series Degrassi: The Next Generation
- Dave Seville, a character from Alvin and the Chipmunk
- The title character of Dangerous Dave, a computer game by John Romero
- The title character of Dave the Barbarian, a Disney Channel cartoon series
- Dave Grant, a father character from Disney Channel series Hamster & Gretel
- The title character of the indie video game Dave the Diver
- The title character of Meet Dave, a 2008 comedy film starring Eddie Murphy
- Super Dave Osborne, fictional stuntman
- Dave Derryberry, a twin brother character from Camp Lazlo
- Dave Strider, a character from a web comic Homestuck

== See also ==
- Dav Pilkey
- Davey (given name)
- David (name)
- Davidson (name)
