= Dewi =

Dewi may refer to either a Welsh or Southeast Asian name.

== Welsh name ==
Dewi ([ˈdɛwiː], also [ˈdauwiː] or [ˈdeːwiː]) is an alternate or diminutive form of the Welsh masculine given name Dafydd ("David").

It is most famously borne by the patron saint of Wales, Saint David (Welsh: Dewi Sant).

It may also refer to:

- Dewi Bebb, a Welsh rugby player
- Dewi Bridges, a Welsh bishop
- Dewi Griffiths, a Welsh television producer and radio host
- Dewi Morgan, a Welsh bard
- Dewi Morris, a rugby player who played for England
- Dewi Nantbrân, a Welsh friar
- Dewi Zephaniah Phillips, a Welsh philosopher

== Asian name ==
Dewi ([ˈdewi]) is also the Indonesian and Malay version of the Hindu devi ("goddess").

It may refer to:

- Dewi Danu, the Balinese water goddess
- Dewi Sri, the Javanese goddess of rice and fertility
- "Dewi", a single by Indonesian singer Once
- Dewi Persik, an Indonesian dangdut singer
- Dewi Sartika, an Indonesian educator
- Dewi Sandra, an Indonesian singer and model
- Dewi Sukarno, former wife of Indonesian President Sukarno
- Sandra Dewi, an Indonesian actress and model
- Dewi Driegen, a part-Indonesian Dutch model
- Dewi Claire Schreefel, a part-Indonesian Dutch golfer
- Dewi Lestari Simangunsong (born 1976), Indonesian writer, singer, and songwriter

== See also ==
- Devi (disambiguation)
- Deva (disambiguation) and Dewa (disambiguation), variations of the male form of Dewi
- Dai (given name)
- David (name)
- Davy (given name)
- Dafydd, name
- Dewey (given name)
