= David (surname) =

David or Dávid is a surname derived from the given name David. In Czech and Slovak, the feminine form is Davidová. Notable people with the surname include:

== Arts and entertainment ==
- Anna David (singer) (born 1984), Danish singer
- Annie Louise David (1877–1960), American harpist
- C. D. David (1860–1920), Indian writer in Malayalam
- Craig David (born 1981), English musician
- Damiano David (born 1999), Italian singer-songwriter
- Elizabeth David (1913–1992), British cookery writer
- F. R. David (born 1947), Tunisian-French singer
- Félicien-César David (1810–1876), French composer
- Ferdinand David (musician) (1810–1873), German violinist and composer
- Filip David (1940–2025), Serbian writer and screenwriter
- Gerard David (c. 1455–1523), Dutch renaissance painter
- Gyula Dávid (1913–1977), Hungarian composer
- Hal David (1921–2012), American lyricist and songwriter
- Hérmine David (1886–1970), French painter
- Jacques-Louis David (1748–1825), French painter
- Janina David (1930–2023), Polish-British writer and Holocaust survivor
- Jim David (born 1954), American comedian, actor and writer
- Johann Nepomuk David (1895–1977), Austrian composer
- Jules David (1808–1892), French painter and lithographer
- Jules David (photographer) (1848–1923), French photographer
- Julian David (born 1989), German singer, actor and entertainer
- Karen David (born 1979), Indian-Canadian actress and singer-songwriter
- Keith David (born 1956), American voice actor
- Larry David (born 1947), American comedian, writer, and actor
- Lukas David (1934–2021), Austrian classical violinist
- Michal David (born 1960), Czech singer and songwriter
- Nathan Matthew David, American film score composer
- Peter David (1956–2025), American writer
- Pierre Jean David (1788–1856), called "David d'Angers", French sculptor
- Stacey David (born 1963), American TV personality and hot rod builder
- Stuart David (born 1969), Scottish musician and novelist

== Sports ==
- Colt David (born 1985), American football player
- Dickie David (1879–1939), Wales national rugby union player
- Gabrielle David (born 1999), Canadian ice hockey player
- Gary David (born 1978), Filipino basketball player
- Guy David (footballer) (1947–2008), French football player and coach
- Jason David (born 1982), Canadian-American football cornerback
- Jim David (American football) (1927–2007), American football player
- Jonathan David (born 2000), Canadian soccer player
- Karel David (born 1964), Czech long-distance runner
- Kornél Dávid (born 1971), Hungarian basketball player
- Leonardo David (1960–1985), Italian alpine skier
- Markéta Davidová (born 1997), Czech biathlete
- Pavla Davidová (born 1956), Czech basketball player
- Promise David (born 2001), Canadian soccer player
- Shani David (born 1991), Israeli footballer
- Tim David (born 1996), Australian cricketer

== Other ==
- Albert David (1902–1945), American naval officer
- Alki David (born 1968), Cypriot-British businessman and actor
- Aneth David (born 1990), Tanzanian biotechnologist
- Anna David (journalist) (born 1970), American journalist
- Christian David (1692–1751), German-Czech missionary, writer and hymnwriter
- Constantin David (1908–1941), Romanian communist activist
- Cristian David (politician) (born 1967), Romanian politician
- Edgeworth David (1858–1934), Welsh-Australian geologist and explorer
- Fabrice David, Mauritian politician
- Ferenc Dávid (1510–1579), Hungarian preacher and Unitarian theologian
- Guy David (mathematician) (born 1957), French mathematician
- Herbert A. David (1925–2014), American statistician
- Jacques David (bishop) (1930–2018), French Roman Catholic prelate
- James Burty David (1946–2009), Mauritian politician
- Kara David (born 1973), Filipino broadcast journalist
- Kim David (born 1961), American politician
- Leopold David (1878–1924), American politician
- Maria Jeyarani David (born 1951), ordained Christian missionary from Malaysia
- Martine David (1952–2025), French politician
- Pablo Ángeles David (1889–1965), Filipino politician
- Pablo Virgilio David (born 1959), Filipino cardinal and bishop
- Sheila David, American chemist
- Thomas E. David (1920–1972), American politician

== Fictional characters ==
- Mara David (later Del Valle) and Clara David (after Del Valle), characters in 2010 Philippine drama series Mara Clara
- Martin David, the main character in the film The Hunter
- Ziva David, a main character in the series NCIS

== See also ==
- Dávid family, a Hungarian noble family, based in present-day Slovakia
- Davide
- Kidnapping of Evyatar David
