= Davídek =

Davídek (feminine: Davídková) is a Czech surname. It is a diminutive of the given name David and the surname David. Notable people with the surname include:

- Felix Maria Davídek (1921–1988) Czech Roman Catholic bishop
- Jolana Matoušková, née Davídková (born 1979), Czech para table tennis player
- Martin Davídek (born 1986), Czech ice hockey player
- Milan Davídek (born 1998), Czech ice hockey player
