= Dravidian =

Dravidian, Dravidan, or Dravida may refer to:

== Language and culture ==
- Dravidian languages, a family of languages spoken mainly in South India and northeastern Sri Lanka
- Proto-Dravidian language, a model of the common ancestor of the Dravidian languages
- Dravidian University, a university situated in Andhra Pradesh
- South Indian culture, modern Dravidian culture
- Dravidian architecture, Hindu temple architecture

== Geography ==
- Dravida Nadu, a proposed country for the southern Dravidian languages
- South India, the region which is called Dravida in the Indian anthem
- Dravida kingdom, an ancient region mentioned in the Mahabharata

== Ethnicity ==
- Dravidian peoples, ethnic groups primarily in South India.
- Homo Dravida, a historically defined race, propagated also by Devaneya Pavanar
- Adi Dravida, natives of Southern India

== Religion ==
- Dravidian folk religion

== Others ==
- Dravidan (1989 film), a 1989 Tamil film
- Dravida Sangha

== See also ==
- Dravid (surname)
- Davidian (disambiguation)
