= Davson =

Davson may refer to:

- Sir Charles Davson (1857–1933), British colonial judge
- Sir Edward Davson, 1st Baronet (1875–1937), British businessman
- Sir Henry Katz Davson (1830–1909), British Guianan merchant
- Hugh Davson (1909–1996), English physiologist
- Sir Ivan Davson (1884–1947), British businessman
- Percival Davson (1877–1959), British fencer and tennis player
- Victor Davson (born 1948), Guyanese-American artist

== See also ==
- Davson baronets
- Davson–Danielli model
