= Assinovskaya =

Rural locality in Chechnya, Russia

Assinovskaya Ассиновская
- Stanitsa

Other transcription(s)
  - Chechen: Эха-Борзе
  - Ingush: Ахь-Борза
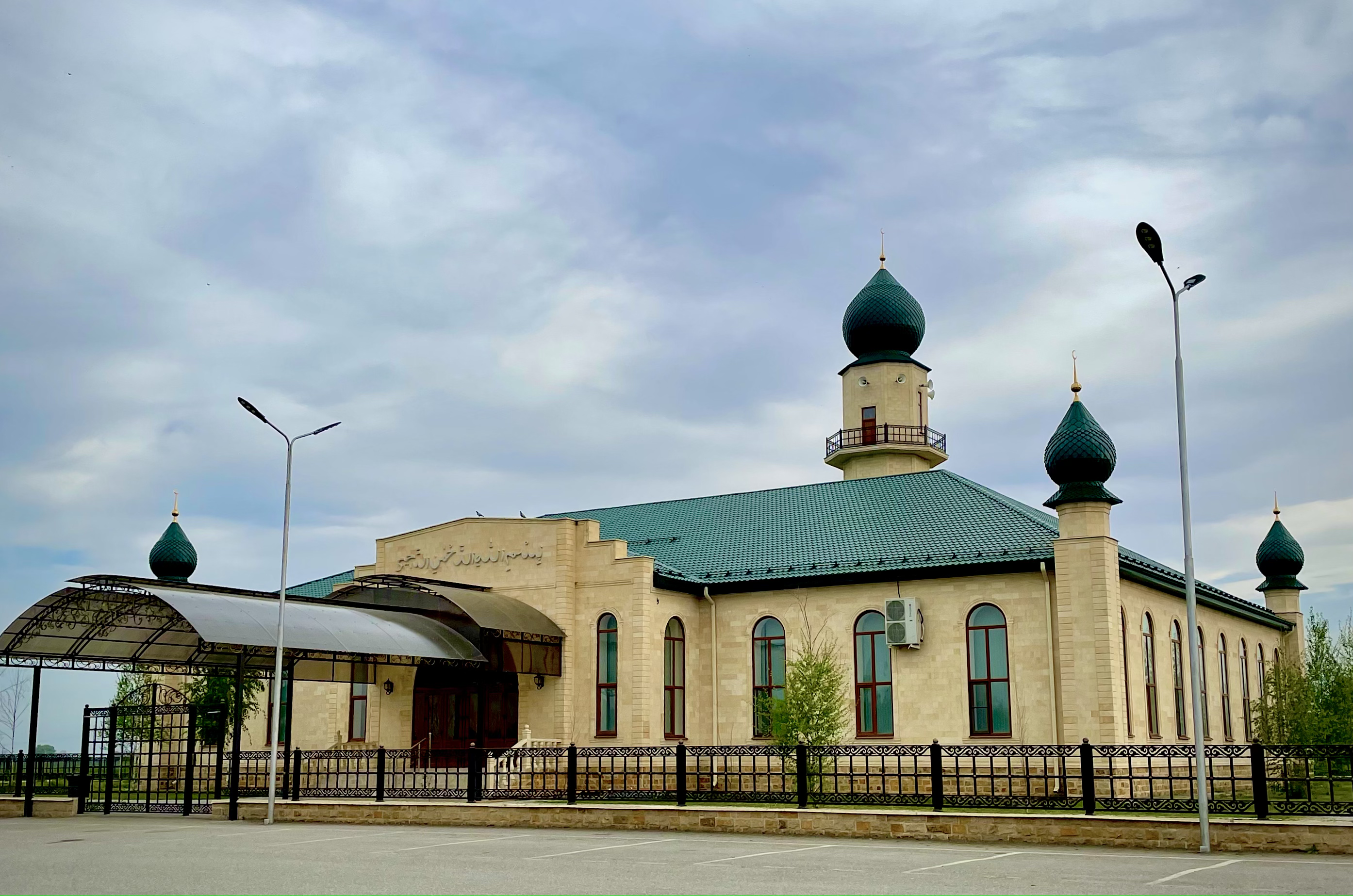
- Mosque in Assinovskaya
- Interactive map of Assinovskaya
- Location of Assinovskaya Assinovskaya (Chechnya)
- Coordinates: 43°14′07″N 45°10′55″E
- Country: Russia
- Federal subject: Chechnya
- Founded: 1847
- Elevation: 273 m (896 ft)

Population (2021 Census)
  - Total: 9,809
  - Estimate (2025): 9,504 (−3.1%)

Administrative status
  - Subordinated to: Sernovodsky District
- Time zone: UTC+3 (MSK)
- Postal code: 366703
- OKTMO ID: 96631404101

Assinovskaya is a village in the Sernovodsk District of the Chechen Republic.

== Administrative and municipal status ==
Municipally, Assinovskaya is incorporated as Assinovskoye rural settlement. It is the administrative center and only settlement of the municipality.

== Geography ==
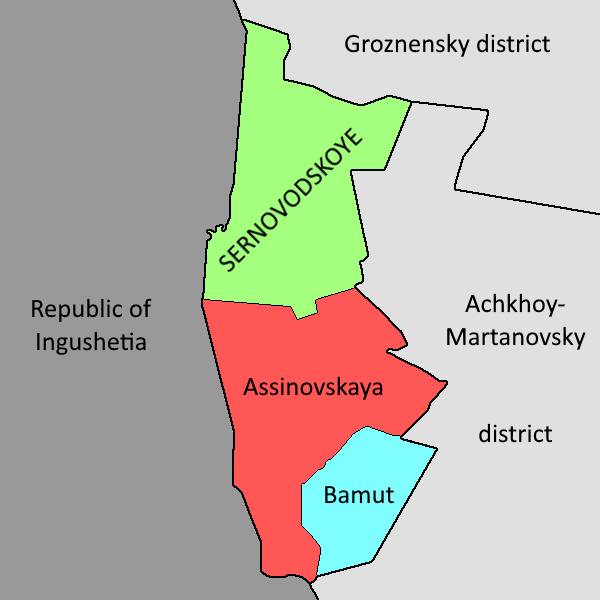
Map of Sunzhensky District, Chechnya. Assinovskaya is in the south

The village of Assinovskaya is located on the left bank of the Assa River (hence the name). It is located 6 kilometres (3.7 mi) south of the village of Sernovodskoye and 45 kilometres (28 mi) west of the city of Grozny.

The nearest settlements to Assinovskaya are Sernovodskoye in the north, Novy Sharoy in the east, Achkhoy-Martan in the south-east, Bamut in the south, and Berd-Yurt and Nesterovskaya in the west.

== History ==
The village of Assinovskaya was founded in 1847 on the land of the Karabulak aul of Akh-Borzoy. According to official maps at the time, the aul and the village existed simultaneously, so on the map of the for 1871, there are the village of Assinskaya and the aul of Akhbarzoy, which is located on the opposite (right) bank of the Assa river, with Assinovskaya on the left, at the mouth of the Zheltukha stream.

According to the Regulations on the management of the Terek Oblast in 1862, the Ingushskiy Okrug was established as part of the Western Department. It included societies of Nazranians, Karabulaks, Galgai, Kistins, Akkins and Tsorins (also Meredzhin society and some Galanchozh and Yalkharoy auls) which were ceded to Argunskiy Okrug in 1866 due to them belonging to the same nation as the locals (Chechens) and geographically closer to the central governance of the Okrug). The village of Akh-Borzoy (Assinovskaya) was part of the Ingushskiy Okrug.

In the summer of 1992, the church in the village was attacked. About 30 attackers broke religious items, shot at the icons and images with machine guns, and raided the altar. In 1997, the new abbot of the church was killed in another attack, and the walls of the church were burned. In 2013, the rebuilding of the church was finally completed, and the building was reopened.

In 1994, the residents of the village wrote a letter to the former President of the Russian Federation, Boris Yeltsin, with a plea for help, and explaining the facts of robbery, kidnapping and murder against ethnic Russian residents of the village. On 28 March 1999 and 8 April 1999, two Orthodox priests in the village were kidnapped. Peter Sukhonosov, the Archpriest, was killed, and priest Sergey Potapov was released.

In 2003, the village of Assinovskaya, together with Sernovodskoye, were transferred to Chechnya.

== Population ==
- 1939 Census: 6,004
- 1959 Census: 7,314
- 1970 Census: 7,492
- 1979 Census: 7,020
- 1990 Census: 6,969
- 2002 Census: 10,248
- 2010 Census: 10,184
- 2019 estimate: 10,992

According to the 2010 Census, the majority of residents of Assinovskaya (10,058 or 98.76%) were ethnic Chechens, with 126 people (1.24%) coming from other ethnic backgrounds.

== Bibliography ==
- Ингушетия в политике Российской империи на Кавказе. XIX век. Сборник документов и материалов (in Russian). Ростов-на-Дону: Южный издательский дом. 2020. pp. 1–760. ISBN 978-5-98864-060-8.
- Список горских аулов Кубанской и Терской областей / Сборник статистических сведений о Кавказе / Сост. и ред. Н. И. Воронов, Кавказский отдел Императорского русского географического общества (in Russian). Тифлис: Типография Главного Управления Наместника Кавказского; типогрфия Меликова и К. 1869. pp. 41—52 (418—429 PDF).
