= Nesterovskaya, Republic of Ingushetia =

Nesterovskaya Нестеровская
- Stanitsa
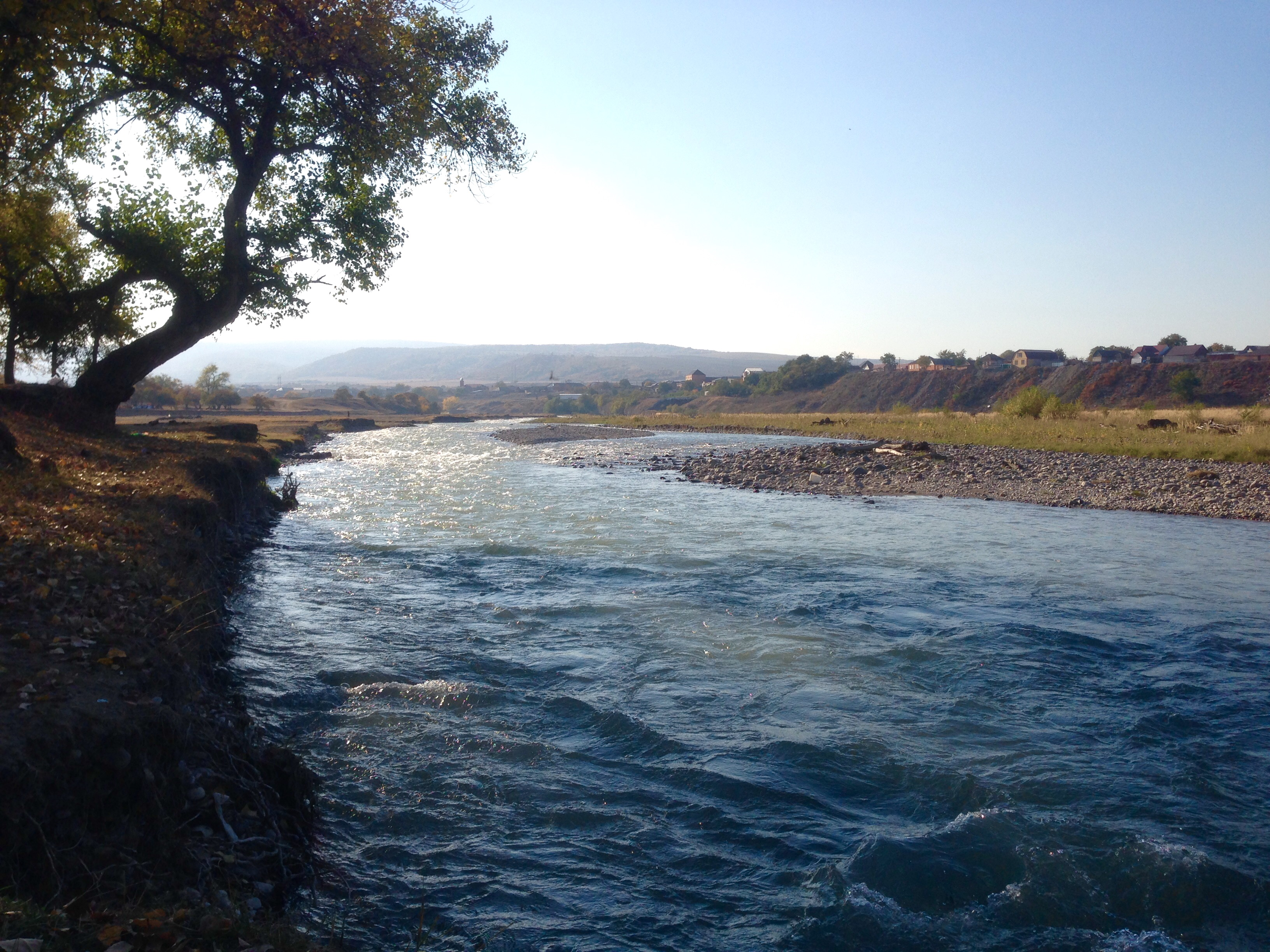
- Assa river in Nesterovskaya
- Interactive map of Nesterovskaya
- Location of Nesterovskaya Nesterovskaya (Republic of Ingushetia)
- Coordinates: 43°14′20″N 45°3′20″E
- Country: Russia
- Federal subject: Ingushetia
- Founded: 1847
- Elevation: 387 m (1,270 ft)

Population (2010 Census)
  - Total: 21,937
  - Estimate (2025): 18,614 (−15.1%)

Administrative status
  - Subordinated to: Sunzhensky District
- Time zone: UTC+3 (MSK)
- Postal code: 165522
- OKTMO ID: 26610410101

Nesterovskaya (Ingush: ГIажара-Юрт, Ghažara-Jurt; Russian: Нестеровская) is a stanitsa in Sunzhensky District of Ingushetia, Russia. It is located on the Assa River. Population: 21,937 (2010 census); .

== History ==
=== Etymology and early history ===
The modern Ingush name Gazhary-Yurt for the village was derived from the nearby village of Gazhir-Yurt or Khazhir-Yurt. According to historical documents, the village was often mentioned in connection with raids carried out by mountaineers from Little Chechnya on submissive Karabulak villages in the early 1840s. These villages, along with settlements of the Nazran society, were part of the Vladikavkaz military district.

The fortification named Nesterovsky, located near Gazhir-Yurt, was established by a decree from the Minister of War, A. I. Chernyshev, on March 4, 1843. The decree stated that the Sovereign Emperor had commanded to give the name "Nesterovskoye" to the new fortification erected near the "ravaged village of Gazhir-Yurt".

In 1843, 125 families of "hunters" (volunteers) from other villages of the 1st Sunzhensky regiment of the Caucasian linear Cossack army were settled in the village. These families were exempt from military service for three years and the village was assigned to the same regiment. By 1874, Nesterovskaya had 200 households with 1094 inhabitants and a school and Orthodox church.

=== Russian Revolution and civil war ===
The Russian Revolution of 1917 was a political and social revolution that marked the end of the Romanov dynasty and the beginning of Soviet rule in Russia. The Revolution had an impact on the people of Nesterovskaya and the surrounding areas.

The Civil War that followed the Revolution was a time of turmoil in Russia, with various factions vying for power and control of the country. During this time, Nesterovskaya was caught up in the conflict and its residents were affected by the violence and instability. It is reported that in September 1920, it was planned to evict the Cossacks from Nesterovskaya because of their sympathy for the White movement, on the orders of Sergo Ordzhonikidze. However, it is unclear to what extent this order was carried out and whether it was carried out at all. Eviction of Cossacks was a common practice used by the Bolsheviks during the Civil War in the Sunzha basin.

Despite this, Nesterovskaya managed to stay stable in the following years. By 1874, there were 200 households in the village with 1094 inhabitants, and the village had a school and an Orthodox church. During the Great Patriotic War, Nesterovskaya was in the front line, and in the winter of 1942-1943, the 131st Fighter Aviation Regiment was stationed in the village.

=== The Great Patriotic War ===
The Great Patriotic War (1941-1945) was a significant event in the history of Russia and the village of Nesterovskaya was located in the front line during the Battle for the Caucasus. In the winter of 1942-1943, the 131st Fighter Aviation Regiment was stationed in the village. It is known that during the war, many residents of Nesterovskaya participated in the fighting on the front lines, as well as in the defense of the village and its surrounding areas.

The Great Patriotic War had an impact on village causing widespread destruction and displacement of the population. The infrastructure and buildings of the village were severely damaged, and many residents were forced to leave their homes and flee to other areas.

Despite this the residents worked to rebuild their homes and communities. After the war, Nesterovskaya underwent a period of reconstruction and renewal, as residents worked to restore the village to its former state and rebuild their homes.

=== The Second Chechen War ===
In 2001, during the Second Chechen War, Nesterovskaya was the site of a fatal attack on a Russian helicopter squadron commander, border guard Leonid Konstantinov. Konstantinov, who was posthumously awarded the title Hero of the Russian Federation, was killed while flying over Nesterovskaya.

In 2004, the secondary school in Nesterovskaya was targeted by terrorists led by Abu Zaid, who planned to use the school as a backup target in the event that they failed to capture School No. 1 in Beslan. Although the attack on Nesterovskaya did not take place for various reasons, the designation of the secondary school in Nesterovskaya as a potential target was said to have highlighted the volatile security situation in the area at the time.

In 2006, there was a battle in Nesterovskaya between Russian security forces and members of the Islamist bandit underground. During this battle, a Chechen policeman named Muslim Ismailov was killed. He was posthumously awarded the title of Hero of the Russian Federation for bravery.

=== Russian conflict and crime ===
In 2006, several incidents of crimes against Russian-speaking citizens were reported, including the setting of homes on fire. Over the next two years, a spate of crimes were committed against residents in neighboring settlements, including the villages of Ordzhonikidzevskaya and Troitskaya and the city of Karabulak.

The most notable of these incidents was the series of attacks on families of Russian teachers that occurred in the summer and autumn of 2007 in Ordzhonikidzevskaya and Karabulak. These crimes, along with other incidents of violence against Russians in the region, prompted a significant public outcry and led to a new wave of Russians leaving the republic. The attacks were said to be a reaction to the Second Chechen war.

== Geography ==
Nesterovskaya is in Ingushetia, Russia. It is situated on the left bank of the Assa River, 5 km south of the city of Sunzha and 30 km northeast of the city of Magas. The nearest settlements are the city of Sunzha to the north, the village of Sernovodskoye to the northeast, the village of Assinovskaya to the east, the villages of Berd-Yurt and Chemulga to the southeast, the village of Alkhasty to the southwest, and the villages of Yandare and Troitskaya to the northwest.

The area surrounding Nesterovskaya is characterized by a combination of forested and steppe landscapes. The Black Mountains rise to the south and west of the village and are covered in deciduous forests. To the south of Nesterovskaya, the mountain slope on the opposite bank of the Assa River is called "Linev's beam." To the north and east of Nesterovskaya, there is a steppe interfluve between the Sunzha and Assa rivers, with small mounds. The Assa-Sunzha canal runs along the western outskirts of the settlement and connects with the Assa River to the southwest of the village. The federal highway P217 "Caucasus" runs to the north of Nesterovskaya.

In the southeast of the village, near the village of Berd-Yurt, there is an inactive hydroelectric power station from which the dam remains.

== Infrastructure and archeology ==
=== Infrastructure ===
Infrastructure in Nesterovskaya includes several educational facilities, including four secondary schools numbered 1 to 4. Additionally, there is a kindergarten and a house of culture with a library. The village also has a dispensary and a district hospital with 40 beds to provide basic medical services to the local population. To cater to the recreational needs of the community, there is also a sports and recreation complex.

=== Archeology ===
The Nesterovskaya area is said to be rich in archaeology, and the presence of a burial mound belonging to the North Caucasian cultural and historical community is evidence of this. This specific mound, known as the Nesterovsky mound, was found to have a small stone fill, mainly consisting of rounded river cobblestone. At the center of the mound, the remains of a wooden block with a skeleton were discovered, with the head facing either northeast or east. The grave goods found at the site consisted of a bronze arrowhead, stone cannonballs, a grater, a stone drilled ax, and a ceramic pot with dark red powder. These artifacts have been dated to the Middle Bronze Age, specifically the second half of the second millennium BCE, making it a valuable and interesting historical site for archaeologists and history enthusiasts alike.

== Demography ==
Historical population
Year	Pop.	±%
1959	6,350	—
1979	6,102	−3.9%
2002	17,389	+185.0%
2006	18,099	+4.1%
2007	18,269	+0.9%
2008	18,463	+1.1%
2009	15,740	−14.7%
2010	21,937	+39.4%
2011	21,965	+0.1%
2012	22,320	+1.6%
2013	22,535	+1.0%
2014	22,676	+0.6%
2015	22,831	+0.7%
2016	22,938	+0.5%
2017	23,071	+0.6%
2018	23,308	+1.0%
2019	23,492	+0.8%
2020	23,672	+0.8%
2021	17,981	−24.0%

=== National composition ===
Census year	2010	2002	1979	1970
Ingush people	▲18,563 (84.62%)	▲13,832 (79.48%)	▲2,420 (39.39%)	1,464 (23.71%)
Chechens	▼2,758 (12.57%)	▲2,816 (16.9%)	▲759 (12.35%)	384 (6.22%)
Russians	▼248 (1.13%)	▼433 (2.49%)	▼2,699 (43.93%)	3,945 (63.90%)
Other	368 (1.68%)	319 (1.83%)	266 (4.33%)	381 (6.17%)
Total	21,937 (100%)	17,389 (100%)	6,144 (100%)	6,174 (100%)
