= Dawidowicz =

Dawidowicz (Polish pronunciation: [daviˈdɔvitʂ]) is a surname of Polish-language origin, meaning "son of David". The Russian and Belarusian form is Davidovich, Ukrainian: Davydovych.

Notable people with this surname:

- Aleksandra Dawidowicz (born 1987), Polish cyclist
- Janina David (1930–2023), born Janina Dawidowicz, Holocaust survivor, British writer and translator
- Lucy Dawidowicz (1915–1990), American historian
- Paweł Dawidowicz (born 1995), Polish footballer

== See also ==
- Davidović, Serbo-Croatian
