= Mai (1989 film) =

1989 film

- Directed by: Rajkumar Sharma
- Written by: Rajkumar Sharma
- Screenplay by: Rajkumar Sharma
- Story by: Rajkumar Sharma
- Produced by: Sachidanand Yadav
- Starring: Padma Khanna; Pankaj Sharma,
- Cinematography: Surjeet Cheema
- Music by: Ram Babu
- Production company: Shiv Ganga Productions
- Release date: 1989
- Country: India
- Language: Bhojpuri

Mai (Bhojpuri for Mother) is a 1989 Bhojpuri-language drama film produced by Sachidanand Yadav under the banner of Shiv Ganga Productions and directed by Rajkumar Sharma, who also wrote the film's story and screenplay. The film stars Padma Khanna and Pankaj Sharma in lead roles with Sheila David, Vijay Khare, Hari Shukla, Narayan Bhandari and Sharda Sinha in supporting roles. The music was composed by Ram Babu.

== Plot ==
The story is set in the rural village of Karitpur in central India and follows a resilient mother who serves as the emotional and moral center of her household. Living with her younger brother‑in‑law Kundan and sister‑in‑law Radha, she finds her family increasingly drawn into conflict with the local zamindar, whose growing attempts to seize their land threaten their stability and livelihood. As pressures mount, the family confronts a series of challenges shaped by exploitation, intimidation, and the social hierarchies of village life. Through these struggles, the mother's quiet strength and unwavering sense of duty become the unifying force that guides the family's resistance and sustains their resolve.

== Cast ==
- Padma Khanna
- Pankaj Sarma
- Sheela David
- Narayan Bhandari
- Vijay Khare
- Hari Shukla
- Sharda Sinha

== Soundtrack ==
The music of Mai was composed by Ram Babu with lyrics written by Shaktikishore Dubey.

| No. | Title | Singers |
|---|---|---|
| 1 | Samhara Na Ta Bhauji | Suresh Wadkar, Anupama Deshpande |
| 2 | Umiriya Bhayile | Dilraj Kaur |
| 3 | Kaahe Sor Bhayil | Suresh Wadkar, Alka Yagnik |
| 4 | Maai Na Rahit | Usha Mangeshkar |
| 5 | Hare Rama Rimjhim | Mahendra Kapoor, Dilraj Kaur, Baby Preety |
| 6 | Naache Laagal Laal Kiriniya | Mahendra Kapoor |
| 7 | Haay Re Jiyara | Sharda Sinha |
| 8 | Bhasurwa | Sharda Sinha |
| 9 | Khelat Mein Rehni | Sharda Sinha |
| 10 | Diyawa Ke Sange | Mahendra Kapoor, Dilraj Kaur |
