= Davidenko =

Davidenko (Russian: Давиденко) is a surname, derived from the given name David. Notable people with the surname include:

- Alexander Davidenko (1899–1932), Soviet composer
- Vassili Davidenko (cyclist) (born 1970), Russian-American cyclist
- Viktor Davidenko (1914–1983), Soviet military engineer

== See also ==
- Davydenko
