= Dawidowski =

Dawidowski or Davidovsky is a surname with variants in multiple languages. The female version is Dawidowska. In Poland, it is most frequent in the north.

Language	Masculine	Feminine	Plural
Polish	Dawidowski [daviˈdɔfski]	Dawidowska [daviˈdɔfska]	Dawidowscy [daviˈdɔfst͡sɨ]
Belarusian (Romanization)	Давідоўскі (Davidoŭski)	Давідоўская (Davidoŭskaja, Davidouskaya, Davidouskaia)	
Lithuanian	Davidauskas	Davidauskienė (married); Davidauskaitė (unmarried)	
Russian (Romanization)	Давидовский (Davidovsky, Davidovskiy, Davidovskij)	Давидовская (Davidovskaya, Davidovskaia, Davidovskaja)	

== People ==
- Konstantin Davidovsky, Soviet actor
- Maciej Aleksy Dawidowski (1920–1943), Polish scoutmaster
- Mario Davidovsky (1934–2019), Argentine composer
- Tomasz Dawidowski (born 1978), Polish footballer
- Wiesław Dawidowski (born 1964), Polish priest of the Roman Catholic Church
