= Dewey (given name) =

Dewey is a masculine given name of Welsh and English origin, an Anglicized spelling of 'Dewi', it is also used as a nickname. Notable people with the name include:

- Dewey Balfa (1927–1992), American musician
- Dewey Bartlett (1919–1979), American politician
- Dewey Bozella (born 1959), American professional boxer
- Dewey Bulkeley (died 1735), English politician
- Dewey Bunnell (born 1952), Anglo-American singer-songwriter, member of America
- Dewey Cooper (born 1974), American kickboxer and boxer
- Dwight Evans (born 1951), American baseball player nicknamed "Dewey"
- Dewey Lambdin (1945–2021), American novelist
- Dewey McClain (born 1954), American football player and politician
- Dewey Martin (actor) (1923–2018), American actor
- Dewey Martin (musician) (1940–2009), Canadian drummer born Walter Milton Dwayne Midkiff
- Dewey Nicks (born 1961), American photographer
- Dewey Redman (1931–2006), American jazz saxophonist
- Dewey H. Reed (1897–1966), American educator and politician
- Dewey Robinson (1898–1950), American actor
- Dewey Robinson (baseball) (born 1955), American baseball player
- Dewey Short (1898–1979), American politician
- Dewey Smith (1972–2009), American aquanaut
- Dewey Stuit (1909–2008), American educational psychologist and academic administrator
- Dewey Weber (1938–1993), American surfer
- Miles Dewey Davis (1926–1991), American jazz trumpeter

== Fictional characters ==
- Dewey Cox, fictional character in the 2007 film Walk Hard: The Dewey Cox Story
- Dewey Novak, fictional character in the television series Eureka Seven
- Dewey Riley, fictional character in the Scream films and in some Scary Movie films
- Dewey (Malcolm in the Middle), Malcolm's younger brother in the television series Malcolm in the Middle
- Huey, Dewey and Louie, fictional nephews of Donald Duck
