= Davidsson =

Davidsson is a Swedish patronymic surname meaning "son of David". Notable people with the surname include:

- Daniel Davidsson (born 1983), speedway rider racing for the Poole Pirates
- Elias Davidsson (1941–2022), Icelandic composer and author
- Hans Davidsson (born 1958), Swedish organist and teacher
- Johan Davidsson (born 1976), Swedish professional ice hockey player
- Jonas Davidsson (born 1984), Swedish speedway rider and current member of Swedish national team
- Jonathan Davidsson (born 1997), Swedish professional ice hockey player
- Marcus Davidsson (born 1998), Swedish professional ice hockey player

== See also ==
- 11798 Davidsson, main-belt asteroid
