= Davidian =

Davidian may refer to:

- Shepherd's Rod, a Seventh-day Adventist offshoot that later called themselves Davidians
- Branch Davidian, the most famous Shepherd's Rod splinter group
- "Davidian", song by Machine Head from their album Burn My Eyes, also widely covered by other metal bands
- Davidian Revolution, changes in Scotland during King David I
- Davidian (surname), from an Armenian background
- A follower of the distinct form of Wotanism promulgated by David Lane (white supremacist)

== See also ==
- Dravidian (disambiguation)
- David (disambiguation)
