= Dai Davies (footballer, born 1948) =

Welsh footballer (1948–2021)

Personal information
- Full name: William David Davies
- Date of birth: 1 April 1948
- Place of birth: Glanaman, Wales
- Date of death: 10 February 2021 (aged 72)
- Height: 6 ft 1 in (1.85 m)
- Position: Goalkeeper

Youth career
- 1960-1969: Cwmamman United

Senior career*
Years	Team	Apps	(Gls)
1969–1970	Swansea City	9	(0)
1970–1977	Everton	82	(0)
1974	→ Swansea City (loan)	6	(0)
1977–1981	Wrexham	144	(0)
1981–1983	Swansea City	71	(0)
1983–1984	Tranmere Rovers	42	(0)
1985	Bangor City	5	(0)
1986	Wrexham	0	(0)
Total		359	(0)

International career
1975–1982	Wales	52	(0)
- * Club domestic league appearances and goals

William David Davies (1 April 1948 – 10 February 2021) was a Welsh professional footballer, who played as a goalkeeper between 1969 and 1987. He made 52 appearances for the Wales national team and played for Everton, Wrexham (twice), Tranmere Rovers and at Swansea City (three spells).

== Background ==
Born William David Davies in Glanamman in the Amman valley on 1 April 1948, his nickname, "Dai", is a Welsh diminutive of Dafydd or David. His father was an amateur footballer, who had trials with Wolverhampton Wanderers and Sheffield United.

Davies attended Amman Valley Grammar School, Ammanford, where he was often known affectionately as "Dai Dai". He showed ability as a goalkeeper from an extremely early age, being picked for the village under-18 team when only 12 years old, and playing for nearby Ammanford Town's adult team at just 15.

In school, Davies played both football and rugby union, appearing for West Wales School in the Second Row, alongside such Welsh rugby greats as Paul Ringer, Barry Llewelyn, Peter Nicholas and Selwyn Williams. He finished playing rugby when the local football club he played for, Ammanford United, lost 4–0, with Davies being at fault for all four goals, after playing a full rugby match a few hours earlier.

Davies played for Carmarthenshire Schools FA and youth football with local clubs (Ammanford United, and then Ammanford Town) – football was not played at the local grammar school – before becoming a professional footballer at the age of 21, in 1969, after qualifying as a PE teacher. He signed for Swansea Town immediately after leaving training college, as Swansea Town were offering him £17.50 a week, while a teacher's salary at that time was just £14 a week.

== Footballing career ==
The Swansea youth team (which also featured Giorgio Chinaglia) had an excellent run in the English Youth Cup, losing to Wolverhampton Wanderers' youth team in the fourth round. Davies was spotted by an Everton scout and, after just over a year at Third Division Swansea City, Davies signed for First Division Everton, then Football League champions, in December 1970 for £40,000. He played for Everton for seven seasons.

In 1977, Davies moved to Wrexham, and in his first season with the club, Wrexham experienced their lowest number of defeats in a season on their way to winning the Football League Division Three title. In 1981, he returned to play for Swansea, and then in 1983 he joined Tranmere Rovers as player-coach. Davies then retired, before returning to play for Bangor City in the 1985–86 European Cup Winners' Cup.

He then returned to Wrexham and won a Welsh Cup medal in 1985–86, but did not play in any further Football League games for them. Davies played 199 games in total for Wrexham, conceding a total of 210 goals (an average of 1.06 goals a game), and kept 63 'clean sheets'.

Davies made his Welsh international debut on 16 April 1975 against Hungary, and went on to miss just 6 of the next 57 Wales matches to finish with a total of 52 caps. He received 28 of his caps while playing for Wrexham. His last appearance for Wales came against France on 2 June 1982.

== After retirement from football ==
Davies's autobiography was published first in Welsh, where it bore the title Hanner Cystal a' Nhad ('Half as Good as My Father') in tribute to his father. It was later published in an English translation in 1986, by when its title had become 'Never Say Dai', a pun.

Davies was a part-owner of a Welsh book and craft shop (Siop y Siswrn) in Mold, Flintshire, and was a football commentator on S4C, in both English and Welsh. Still a qualified teacher, he often worked as a supply teacher and spent a time in 1990 working as a PE teacher for Holywell High School and Argoed High School. He ran a natural healing centre in Llangollen, North Wales, specialising in herbal remedies, remedial massage, muscle work, pilates and reiki.

In November 2008, he sold more than 30 items at Bonhams auctioneers in Chester, with the highest-priced item – a 1980–81 full Welsh international cap – fetching £1,200. A 1982–83 full Welsh international cap sold for £1,140, and a swapped Scotland shirt worn by Graeme Souness sold for £1,020.

Davies was also a Druid, having been initiated into the Welsh Gorsedd of Bards (Gorsedd y Beirdd Ynys Prydain) in 1978.

In August 2020, Davies was diagnosed with terminal pancreatic cancer. In February 2021, The Everton Former Players Foundation confirmed that Davies had died at the age of 72.
