= Davids Island =

Davids Island may refer to:

- Davids Island (New York), United States
- Davids Island (Nunavut), Canada

== See also ==
- Davis Island (disambiguation), several places
- David Island, Antarctica
