= Davidovich =

Surname list

Davidovich is a Russian and Belarusian language patronymic surname and patronymic meaning "son of David". It is usually a Jewish surname, sometimes transliterated as Davidovitch. Notable people with the surname include:

== Davidovich ==
- Alexander Davidovich (born 1967), Ukrainian wrestler
- Alejandro Davidovich Fokina (born 1999), Spanish tennis player.
- Bella Davidovich (born 1928), American pianist
- Benjamin Davidovich (1930–2024), Israeli goalkeeper
- Lolita Davidovich (born 1961), Canadian actress
- Maayan Davidovich (born 1988), Israeli Olympic windsurfer
- Nir Davidovich (born 1976), Israeli goalkeeper
- Paul Davidovich (1737–1814), Austrian soldier

== Davidovitch ==
- Nadav Davidovitch
- Despina Storch née Davidovitch

== See also ==
- Dawidowicz
- Davidović
