= Davids =

Davids is a patronymic surname. The name may refer to:

- Arthur Rhys-Davids (1897–1917), British flying ace
- Brent Michael Davids (born 1959), American composer and flautist
- Dorothy Davids (1923–2014), American / Stockbridge-Munsee Band of the Mohicans educator
- Edgar Davids, Dutch footballer
- Fadlu Davids, South African soccer striker
- Faiek Davids was a South African first class cricketer in the 1980s
- Heintje Davids (1888–1975), Dutch singer and actress
- Hendrik Jan Davids, Dutch tennis player
- Henry Davids, South African cricketer
- Jules Davids (1920–1996), American historian and professor
- Keith B. Davids (born 1968), United States Navy rear admiral and former commander of Naval Special Warfare Command
- Lance Davids, South African footballer
- Lorenzo Davids, Dutch footballer
- Neil Davids, English footballer
- Sharice Davids, American politician and MMA fighter
- Thaddeus Davids, 19th-century New York businessman
- Thomas William Davids (1816–1884), Welsh nonconformist minister and ecclesiastical historian
- Willibrord Davids, judge and former president of the high council of the Netherlands
- Yvette M. Davids (born 1969), United States Navy vice admiral and Deputy Chief of Naval Operations

== See also ==
- Davids Island (disambiguation)
