= Lawrence Que Jr. =

Filipino-American bioinorganic chemist

Lawrence Que, Jr.
- Education: Ateneo de Manila University B.S. (1969); University of Minnesota Ph.D. (1973)
- Known for: First isolation of a nonheme Fe(IV)=O complex
- Awards: ACS Award in Inorganic Chemistry (2017)
- Scientific career
- Fields: Bioinorganic Chemistry
- Workplaces: University of Minnesota; Cornell University
- Thesis: Nuclear Magnetic Resonance (NMR) Studies of Stereochemically Nonrigid Complexes (1973)
- Doctoral advisor: Louis H. Pignolet
- Other academic advisors: Richard H. Holm, Eckhard Münck
- Doctoral students: Sheila David
- Website: Link

Lawrence Que Jr. is a chemist who specializes in bioinorganic chemistry and is Regents Professor Emeritus at the University of Minnesota, Twin Cities. He received the 2017 American Chemical Society (ACS) Award in Inorganic Chemistry for his contributions to the field., and the 2008 ACS Alfred Bader Award in Bioinorganic Chemistry.

== Biography ==
Lawrence Que Jr. obtained his B.S. degree in chemistry from Ateneo de Manila University in Quezon City, Philippines in 1969, then received his Ph.D. degree in chemistry from the University of Minnesota in 1973 under the direction of Prof. Louis H. Pignolet. With Prof. Pignolet, Que studied stereochemical non-rigidity in coordination complexes with proton NMR spectroscopy.

Que conducted postdoctoral studies with Prof. Richard H. Holm at the Massachusetts Institute of Technology from 1973 to 1974, where he studied iron-sulfur clusters in proteins and the synthesis of model clusters. He then was a postdoctoral fellow with Prof. Eckard Münck at the Gray Freshwater Biological Institute of the University of Minnesota from 1975 to 1977. With Prof. Münck, Que studied the mechanism of the protocatechuate 3,4-dioxygenase enzyme, using Mössbauer and EPR spectroscopies, as well as inhibition studies.

Que began his independent research career at Cornell University as an Assistant Professor of Chemistry in 1977. He then moved back to the University of Minnesota in 1983 where he progressed through the ranks to Regents Professor before retiring in May 2024 after 41 years of service.

Que has published over 450 research manuscripts and 7 patents. He has presented almost 300 invited lectures and mentored almost 50 doctoral students. Prior to his retirement in 2024, his inorganic chemistry research group at the University of Minnesota focused on iron chemistry relevant to biocatalysis, in an attempt to better understand oxygen activation mechanisms of nonheme iron enzymes. His group also worked towards designing functional models for iron enzymes and capturing, observing, and categorizing highly active metal-based intermediates, alongside efforts to creat bio-inspired oxidation catalysts for green chemistry applications. For his contributions to the field of inorganic and bioinorganic chemistry, Que received the American Chemical Society's 2008 Alfred Bader Award in Bioinorganic Chemistry and 2017 Award in Inorganic Chemistry. He was elected as a member of the National Academy of Sciences in 2022.

== Research ==
=== Bioinspired catalysis ===
Que has been studying the behaviors of high-valent iron-oxo species in relation to their ability of hydroxylation. Previous high-valent iron-oxo species have been noted and studied by observing [(Por•)Fe(IV)=O]+ in heme systems. However, it is yet to be established that a high-valent state could be accessed without a nonheme ligand environment. Que and his group studied various nonheme iron based complexes and through elaborate mechanistic work proved that Fe(V)=O species can indeed exist without the supporting heme ligand.

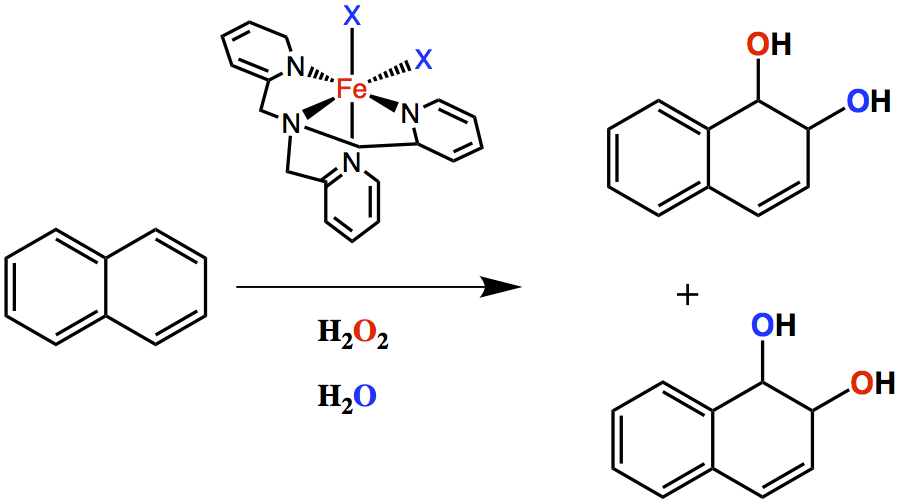
The structure of [Fe(II)(TPA)(CH_{3}CN)_{2}]^{2+} is the catalyst in this reaction scheme.

=== Nonheme iron oxygenases ===
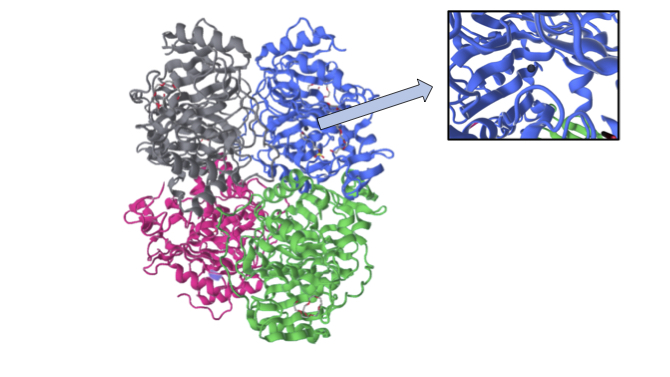
(HPCA) 2,3-dioxygenase with heme iron center. Each colored chain contains one iron heme center. The black sphere in the insert picture represents the iron nuclei.

One of Que’s focuses is on the activation of dioxygen species in biological systems through non-heme iron active sites. More specifically, one of Que’s focuses is on homoprotocatechuate (HPCA) 2,3-dioxygenase, which mediates the electron transfer between catechol substrates and O_{2} to form a [M(II)(semiquinone)superoxo] intermediate. Non-heme iron active sites, including those involving Mn(II) and Co(II), have proven to be equally potent as heme iron active sites with comparable or greater KMO_{2} and k_{cat}. By exploring nonheme iron oxygenases, Que hopes to optimize the first steps in the industrial production of methane gas, which would yield enormous energy savings for industry.

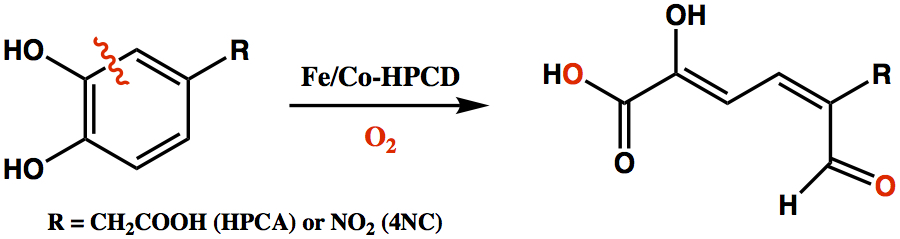
A reaction scheme of Fe/Co-HPCD as a catalyst.

=== High-valent iron-oxos ===
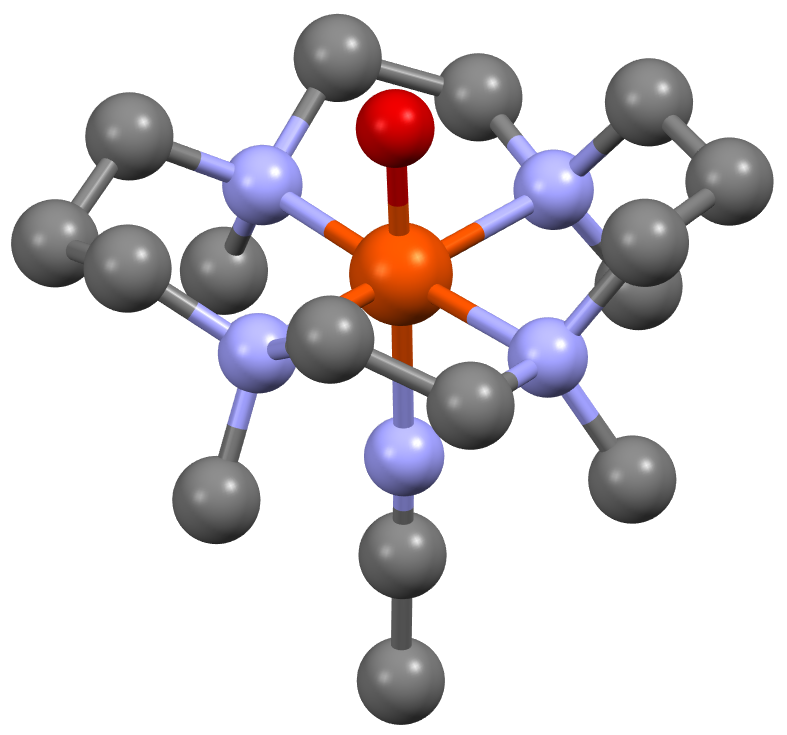
Crystal structure of trans-[Fe(IV)(O)(TMC)(NCCH_{3})](OTf)_{2}. Orange sphere represents Fe, red sphere represents O, blue-purple spheres represent N, and gray spheres represent C. H atoms and OTf- counterions have been omitted.

Que has worked on synthesizing oxoiron(IV) complexes. In 2003, Que reported the crystallographic and spectroscopic characterization of a low spin (S = 1) Fe(IV)=O. The first crystallographic example of a high spin (S = 2) Fe(IV)=O was achieved in 2009, and in 2011, Que proved that the ligand used in the previous study could also support a tricationic cyanoiron(IV) complex.
