= Tavitian =

Tavitian (Armenian: Տաւիտյան) is an Armenian surname, which means "son of David", thus making it equivalent to Davidson. The name may refer to:

- Bernard Tavitian (born 1960), French game designer
- Harry Tavitian (born 1952), Romanian musician
