= Sir Anthony Glyn, 2nd Baronet =

British-Guyanese author (1922–1998)

Sir Anthony Glyn (13 March 1922, London - 20 January 1998, France) was a British-Guyanese author of about a dozen books. His books included a number of novels and a biography of his grandmother, the novelist Elinor Glyn.

== Early life and education ==
Geoffrey Leo Simon Davson was born in London on 13 March 1922. He was the son of the Guyanese businessman and government advisor, Sir Edward Davson and his wife, Margot Elinor Glyn OBE. His maternal grandmother was the novelist, Elinor Glyn and his paternal grandfather was the sugar merchant, Sir Henry Davson. Davson's great-grandfather, Simon Davson, had settled in Guyana after fleeing Latvia.

Davson was educated at Eton College.

He served in the British army during World War II. Davson joined the Welsh Guards as an intelligence officer, then joined the family business working in numerous roles from farmhand to management. In 1937, Glyn's father died and Glyn succeeded him as the 2nd Baronet of Berbice.

== Writing career ==
In the 1950s, he changed his name by deed poll and started writing. He adopted the surname of his maternal grandmother, a well-known author, as well as the given name, Anthony. Anthony Glyn's first novel was "Romanza" (1953) and his most critically acclaimed was "The Dragon Variation" (1969). In 1955, he also wrote a biography of his grandmother.

== Death ==
Glyn died at his home in Villeneuve-Loubet, France on 20 January 1998; he was 75. He was buried at Pere Lachaise cemetery, Paris.

Glyn was survived by his wife, Susan, Lady Glyn. He had married Susan Rhys Williams, the daughter of Sir Rhys Rhys Williams, in 1946. The couple had two daughters. Their daughter Caroline, an author like her father, published her first book in 1963 when she was 15.

Glyn was succeeded to the baronetcy by his brother Christopher Davson.

== Works ==
- "Romanza" (1953)
- "Jungle of Eden" (1954)
- The Ram in the Thicket (1957)
- The Terminal (1965).
- "The Dragon Variation (1969)
- Glyn, Anthony. 1970. British: A Portrait of a People. London: Hutchinson.
- Glyn, Anthony. 1986. The Companion Guide to Paris.
