= Kawika =

Kawika is a Hawaiian name meaning "David".

Notable people with the name include:

- Kawika Crowley (born 1952), Japanese-American politician
- Kawika Kapahulehua (1930–2007), Hawaiian sailor
- Kawika Mitchell (born 1979), American football player
- Kawika Shoji (born 1987), American volleyball player
- Justin Kawika Young (born 1978), American singer
- Rap Reiplinger (1950–1984), American comedian whose full name is James Kawika Piʻimauna "Rap" Reiplinger

== See also ==
- David (name), including lists of people with the name
- "Kawika", a song from The Sunday Manoa's 1971 album Guava Jam
