= Dravid (surname) =

Dravid (Marathi: द्रविड) is a surname found in the Deshastha Rigvedi Brahmin community in the states of Maharashtra and Karnataka, India. It’s also found amongst the Vadama Iyers of Tamil Nadu. It originates from the Sanskrit word Dravida (meaning South India or Tamil), indicating ancestors who migrated from the Tamil region to Maharashtra, Karnataka, and Andhra Pradesh. It is notably held by former Indian cricketer Rahul Dravid.

== Notable people ==
- Rahul Dravid (born 1973), former player and captain of the Indian national cricket team
- Rajeshwar Shastri Dravid (1899-1950), Indian writer, scholar, grammarian and translator of Sanskrit literature
