= Sernovodskoye, Chechnya =

Rural locality in Sunzhensky District, Chechnya, Russia

Coordinates: 43°19′03″N 45°08′28″E

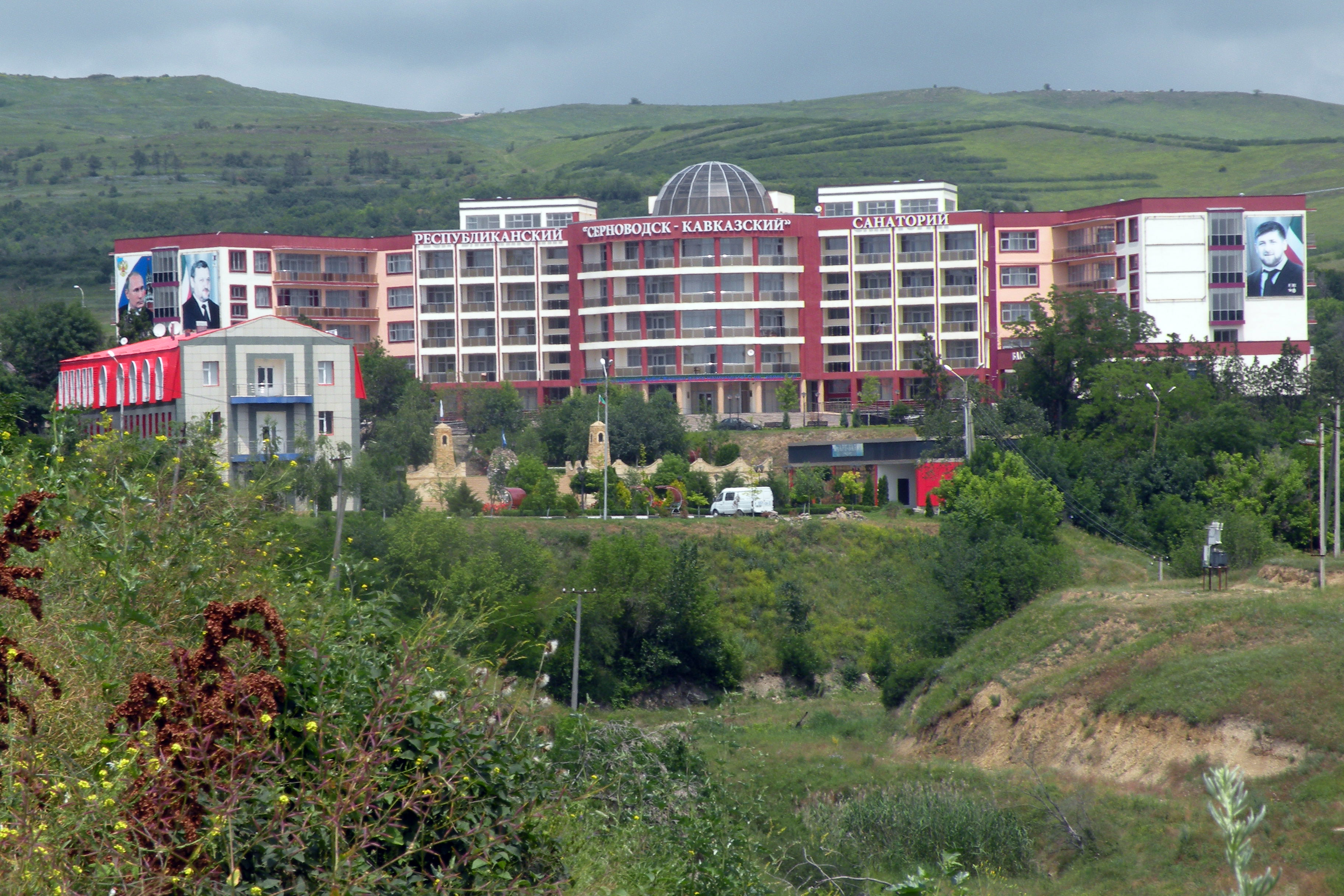
The Sernovodsk-Kavkazsky Resort.

Sernovodskoye (Russian: Серноводское, Chechen: Эна-Хишка, Ena-Xişka) is a rural locality (a selo) in Sernovodsky District, Chechnya. Population: 10,805 (2010 census); 9,860 (2002 census); The republican balneological resort "Sernovodsk-Kavkazsky" is located in the village.

== Administrative and municipal status ==
Municipally, Sernovodskoye is incorporated as Sernovodskoye rural settlement. It is the administrative center of the municipality and is the only settlement included in it. It is also the administrative center of the Chechen section of Sunzhensky District, one of the 3 settlements included in the district.

== Geography ==
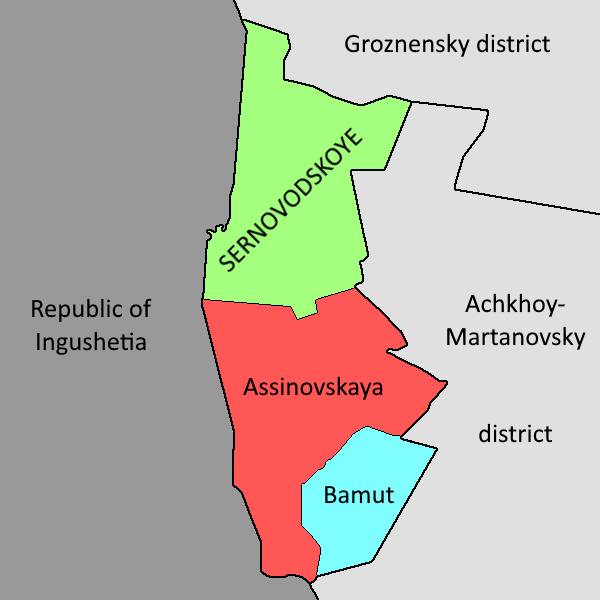
Map of Sernovodsky (Sunzhensky) District, Chechnya. Sernovodskoye is in the north

Sernovodskoye is located at the foot of the southern slope of the Sunzhensky Ridge. It is located on both banks of the Sunzha River, 8 kilometres (5.0 mi) east of the city of Sunzha and 58 kilometres (36 mi) west of the city of Grozny.

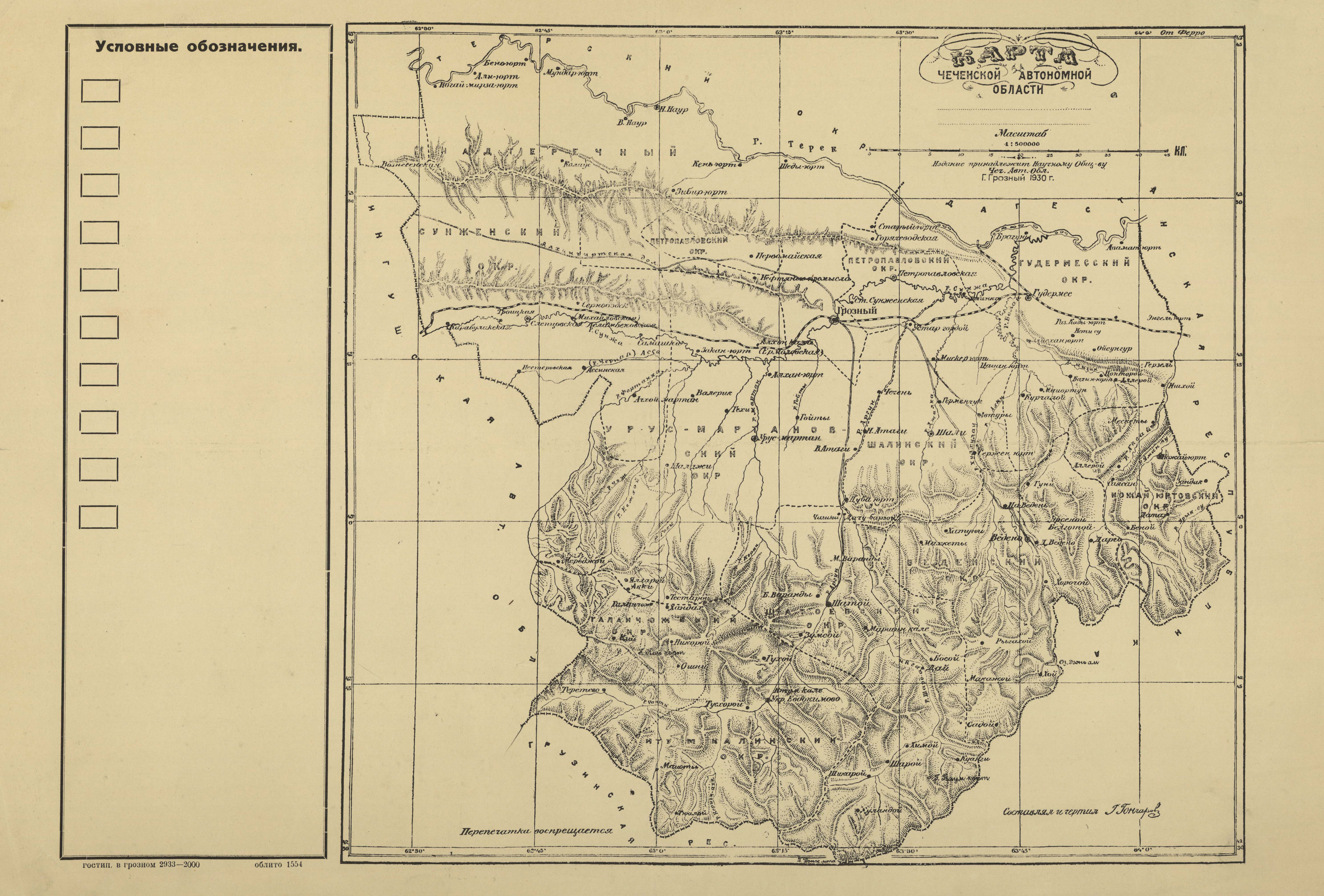
Sernovodskoye Village on the Map of the Chechen Autonomous Region

The nearest settlements to Sernovodskoye are Nagornoye in the north, the city of Sunzha in the west, Assinovskaya in the south, and the villages of Davydenko, Novy Sharoy, and Samashki in the east.

=== Climate ===
The climate of Sernovodskoye is temperate and continental. Winters are moderately mild and there are frequent fogs and some snow cover. The average temperature in January is −4°C. Summers are warm, sometimes with hot and dry weather. The average temperature in July is +25°C. The average annual rainfall is around 500mm and mainly falls between April and October. The average annual humidity is 70%. Wind mainly blows from the east and west.

== History ==
In 1819, on the site of the modern village, a fortification was built named Pregradny Stan. During the 1825-1826 Insurgency in the North Caucasus, the fortress was attacked by North Caucasian rebels led by Bey-Bulat Taymiev. The fortress survived the attack, but the rebels burnt part of it down, captured several people and two Licorne cannons. In 1846, in honor of the Christian holiday of the Archangel Michael, the Mikhailovsky Church was built. The village was then given the name Mikhailovsky.

In 1920, after the suppression of the anti-Soviet uprising, the entire Cossack population of the village was deported. The deportation was taken in three stages - the first group were sent to Pavlodolskaya on 13 November, the second group were sent to Soldatskaya on 29 November, and the third and final group were sent to Sovetskaya on 3 December. That day, the empty village was handed over to Chechen control. Soon after, it was settled by Chechens and renamed to Aslambek.

From 8 March 1926 to 11 February 1929, it was the administrative center of Novo-Chechensky District, Chechen Autonomous Oblast.

In 1944, after the deportation of the Chechen and Ingush people, the Chechen-Ingush ASSR was abolished, and the village of Aslambek was renamed to Sernovodskoye.

Since the 1970s, the village has also been known as Sernovodsk.

Since 2003, the village has been the administrative center of Sunzhensky District, Chechnya.

== Population ==
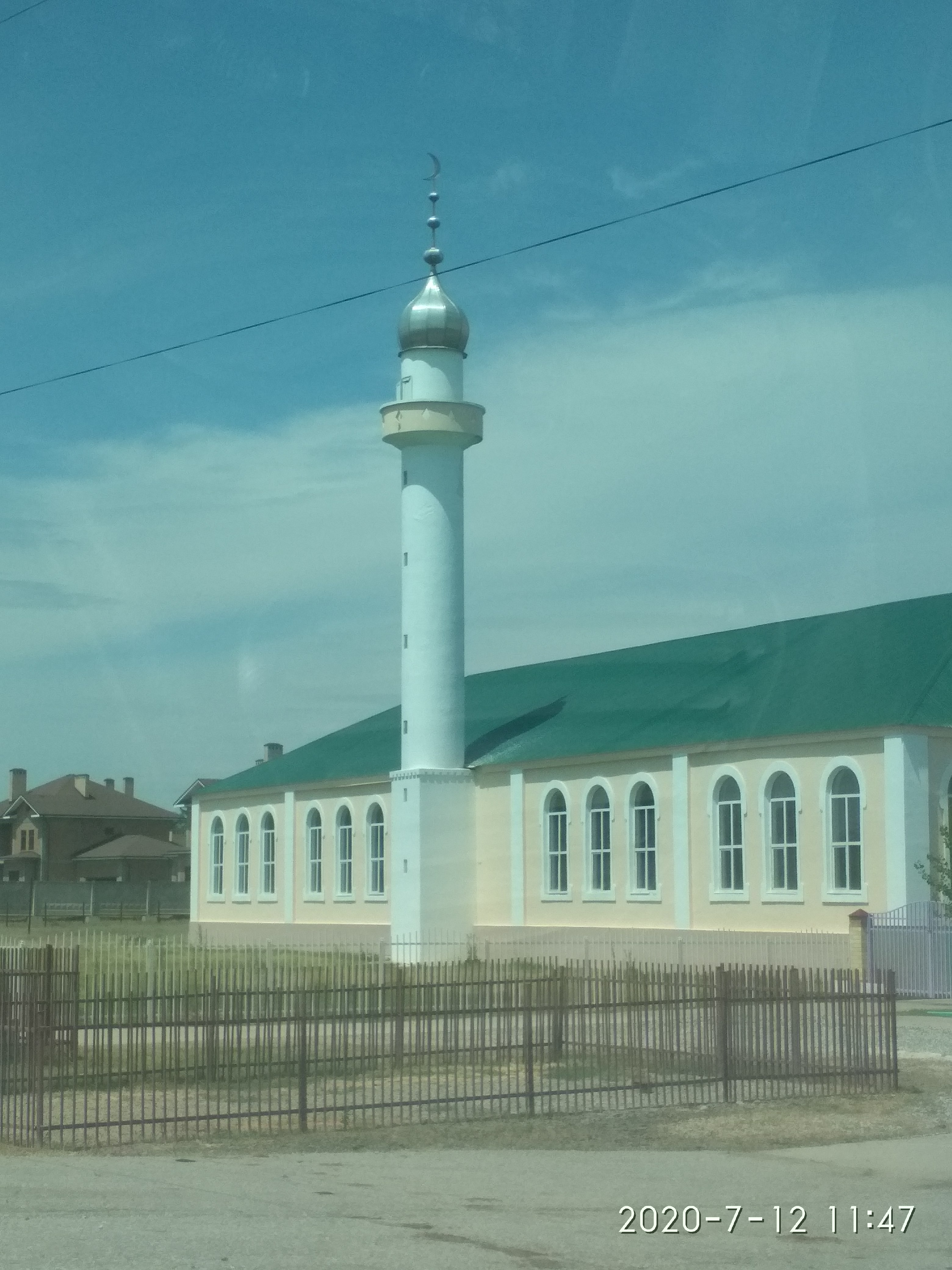
Mosque in Sernovodskoye

- 1970 Census: 7,712
- 1979 Census: 8,732
- 1990 Census: 8,041
- 2002 Census: 9,860
- 2010 Census: 10,805
- 2019 estimate: 12,048

According to the 2010 Census, the majority of residents of Sernovodskaya (10,736 or 99.34%) were ethnic Chechens with 69 people (0.64%) from other ethnic groups.
