= Davis Island =

Davis Island may refer to:

== Landforms ==
=== Antarctica ===
- Davis Island (Palmer Archipelago)

=== Asia ===
- Davis Island (Mergui Archipelago)

=== North America ===
- Davis Island (Connecticut)
- Witch Island (a.k.a. Davis Island), Maine
- Davis Island (Mississippi)
- Davis Island (Pennsylvania)
- Davis Island (Saskatchewan)

=== Oceania ===
- Davis Island, New Zealand, Auckland Islands
- Davis Land, a phantom island

== Townships ==
- Davis Islands (Tampa), a neighborhood in Tampa, Florida, U.S.

== See also ==
- David Island, Antarctica
- Davids Island (disambiguation), several places
