= Davydenko =

Davydenko (Ukrainian: Давиденко; Russian: Давыденко; Belarusian: Давыдзенка) is a Ukrainian surname, derived from the given name David. Notable people with the surname include:

- Anton Davydenko (born 1996), Ukrainian trampoline gymnast
- Nikolay Davydenko (born 1981), Russian tennis player
- Philipp Davydenko (born 1992), Russian tennis player, brother of Nikolay
- Valeriy Davydenko (1973–2020), Ukrainian businessman and politician
- Tamara Davydenko (born 1975), Belarusian rower

== See also ==
- Davidenko
