= Vitaly Aleksandrovich =

Soviet military engineer and physicist (1914–1983)

- Виталий Александрович
- Born: Aleksandrovich, Vitaly Aleksandrovich (Александрович, Виталий Александрович); 14 February 1904; Odesa, Odesa Oblast, Russia
- Died: 12 July 1959 (aged 55); Dnipro, Ukraine in Soviet Union
- Citizenship: Soviet Union
- Education: Institute of Chemical Technology
- Known for: Soviet program of nuclear weapons
- Awards: Order of Lenin (1949)
- Scientific career
- Fields: Chemistry
- Institutions: Laboratory No. 2 KB-11

Vitaliy Aleksandrovich Aleksandrovich (Russian: Виталий Александрович Александрович; 14 February 1904 – 12 July 1959) was a Soviet chemist of Ukrainian origin who also became part of the Soviet program that developed nuclear weapons from the late 1940s. He was a co-author of the design report of the first Soviet two-stage thermonuclear bomb, the RDS-37.

== Life and career ==
He was born in Odessa, Russian Empire. He attended the Institute of Chemical Technology in Dnipropetrovsk, graduating in 1931. From 1932 to 1941, he taught at his alma mater. He was an avid motorcyclist and reader; he read and re-read the complete works of Vladimir Lenin and Friedrich Engels.

Upon the invasion of Ukraine by Nazi Germany in 1941, Aleksandrovich was evacuated to the city of Pyatigorsk, North Caucasus, and his wife and children to the nearby city of Kislovodsk. He had been excused military service on medical grounds. He protected Jews and partisans from the Nazis by hiding them in a petrol station that he had been managing in the Crimea. In December 1941, he moved his family to Tbilisi, where his father lived, while he returned to his work at the Pharmaceutical Institute in Pyatigorsk. He organised the manufacture of military items for Soviet resistance under a civilian cloak e.g. making grenades at a toy factory. He and other employees were instructed to destroy anything of value in the Pharmaceutical Institute when it was clear the city was about to fall to Nazi troops. He moved to Tbilisi and joined the engineering corps of the Transcaucasian Front as a chemical engineer. In 1943 he was sent to their military warehouse in Kakheti.

On the order of the State Defence Committee, he was sent to join Igor Kurchatov's Laboratory No.2 in 1944, as a junior technician in the nascent nuclear industry. He worked for a time at the Institute of Chemical Physics in Leningrad, where he also met two leaders of the Soviet nuclear programme, the overall leader Yulii Khariton and Yakov Zel'dovich. The endeavour was moved under tight security to KB-11, in the closed city of Sarov, Nizhny Novgorod Oblast. Alfred Yanovich Apin, from the Institute of Chemical Physics, led Laboratory No.1 from June 1947, in which Aleksandrovich, V.A. Davidenko, M.V. Dmitriev, V.R. Negin and designer A.I. Abramov were put to work designing and manufacturing neutron-emitting primers for the bombs. Three laboratories worked separately under Apin, and it was decided the manufacture would take place in Alesandrovich's laboratory, with equipment offered by Davidenko's. The production route used newly-produced, vastly more efficient but highly dangerous beryllium/polonium material, following intelligence gathered from Allied research developed from the Manhattan Project. New safety protocols and equipment were developed, however most of the workers in Laboratory No.7 died from radiation-induced illnesses. Khariton ordered the first three sets of primers from Aleksandrovich for June and July 1949; the first Soviet nuclear bomb, the RDS-1, was detonated on 29 August. Aleksandrovich received the Order of Lenin and a prize, the first of a few awards for his nuclear work in the 1940s and 1950s. Apin returned to his role at the Institute of Chemical Physics in 1949 and Aleksandrovich took over as head of the laboratory.

He was one of only two departmental or laboratory heads at KB-11 who were members of the communist party. He was also the sole old friend to remain on good terms with physicist Boris Smagin after the latter was investigated, sacked and internally ostracised (and unable to leave as a security risk) for having losing a small nuclear component.

== Awards and legacy ==
- 1949: Order of Lenin and prize.
- 1953: Stalin Prize and for his atomic work the degree of candidate of chemical and technological sciences
- 1954: Order of the Red Banner of Labour
- 1959: Lenin Prize

Following his untimely death in 1959, Khariton praised the "master" Aleksandrovich, saying the Soviet Union was indebted to him, and physicist E.K.Bonyushkin said that he created "magic" in front of his admiring physicist colleagues. Engineering Lane in the city of Sarov was renamed Aleksandrovich Street in his honour.
