= Davidis =

Davidis is a surname. Notable people with the surname include:

- Alexander Davidis, German born television director, writer and producer
- Henriette Davidis (1801–1876), German cookbook writer
- Sergei Davidis, Russian lawyer, sociologist, human rights activist

== See also ==
- David (name) § Surnames
