= Dai (given name) =

Dai is a Japanese and Welsh masculine given name. The Welsh version is a pet name of Dafydd or David, though it originated as a distinct name, possibly from the Old Celtic word dei meaning "to shine." Notable people with the name include:

- Dai Ailian (1916–2006), Chinese dancer
- Dai Andrews (born 1977), American performance and visual artist
- Dai Baldé (born 2006), Bissau-Guinean footballer
- Dai Bingguo (born 1941), Chinese politician and diplomat
- Dai Bradley (born 1953), English actor
- Dai Buell (1892-1939), American pianist and teacher
- Dai Davies (1880–1944), Welsh footballer
- Dai Davies (1948–2021), Welsh footballer
- Dai Davies (born 1959), Welsh politician
- Dai Greene (born 1986), a British hurdler
- Dai Fujikura (藤倉 大; born 1977), Japanese classical composer
- Dai Henwood (born 1978), New Zealand comedian
- Dai Jin (1388–1462), Chinese painter
- Dai Le (born 1968), Vietnamese-born Australian politician
- Dai Li (1897–1946), Chinese spymaster
- Dai Matsumoto (松本 大; born 1959), Japanese voice actor
- Dai Dai N'tab (born 1994), Dutch long track speed skater
- Dai Nagao, Japanese composer, musician and producer
- Dai Oketani (桶谷 大; born 1977), Japanese basketball coach
- Dai Qing (born 1941), Chinese journalist
- Dai Satō (佐藤 大; born 1969), Japanese screenwriter and musician
- Dai Sijie (born 1954), Chinese-French author and filmmaker
- Dai Vernon (1894–1992), Canadian magician
- Dai Wai Tsun (born 1999), Hong Kong-born Chinese professional footballer
- Dai Vernon (1894–1992), Canadian magician
- Dai Ward (1934–1996), Wales international footballer
- Dai Xi (1801–1860), Chinese painter
- Dai Yi (1926–2024), Chinese historian
- Dai Yongge, Chinese businessman and entrepreneur
- Dai Young (born 1967), Wales international rugby union player
- Dai Zhen (1724–1777), Chinese philosopher

== Fictional characters ==
- Dai, the title character in the manga series Dragon Quest: The Adventure of Dai
- Dai Blackthorn, a character from the role-playing game GURPS
- Dai Bread, a bigamist character in Dylan Thomas' 1954 Radio play Under Milk Wood.
- Mrs Dai Bread One, Dai Bread's first wife.
- Mrs Dai Bread Two, Dai Bread's second wife.
- Dai Dickins, character in the Discworld novel Night Watch, and martyr of the Glorious Revolution Twenty-Fifth of May
- Dai Evans, character in the 1973 Doctor Who serial The Green Death
- Dai Greatcoat, a character from David Jones' In Parenthesis
- Dai Takabayashi (高林 ダイ), a fictional character from the anime series Super Doll Licca-chan
- Dai Station, a character from the Welsh animation series Ivor the Engine
- Dai Bando, a minor character in Richard Llewellyn's novel How Green Was My Valley (novel), played by Rhys Williams in the John Ford film of the same name
