= Martin Davídek =

Czech ice hockey player

- Born: August 7, 1986 (age 39) Opava, Czechoslovakia
- Height: 6 ft 0 in (183 cm)
- Weight: 187 lb (85 kg; 13 st 5 lb)
- Position: Left wing
- Shoots: Right
- DEL2 team Former teams: EHC Bayreuth; Vsetínská hokejová HC Znojemští Orli; HC Kometa Brno; ERC Ingolstadt
- Playing career: 2006–present

Martin Davídek (born August 7, 1986) is a Czech professional ice hockey left winger playing for EHC Bayreuth of DEL2.

Davídek previously played 47 games in the Czech Extraliga for Vsetínská hokejová, HC Znojemští Orli and HC Kometa Brno. He also played two seasons in the Deutsche Eishockey Liga for ERC Ingolstadt, from 2014 to 2016.
