= Dewi Griffiths =

Dewi Griffiths (born 16 August 1931) is a Welsh former BBC television producer and radio host. He joined BBC Wales from the Royal Air Force where he became a producer of TV sports programmes, notably rugby union broadcasts. After his retirement from producing, he hosted the nostalgia record programme A String of Pearls on BBC Radio Wales, which ran for 26 years until the final episode aired on Sunday 28 September 2014. After 60 years at the BBC, Griffiths retired completely following the broadcast of that final episode of A String of Pearls in 2014.
