= Milan Davídek =

Czech ice hockey player

- Born: May 16, 1998 (age 28) Prague, Czech Republic
- Height: 6 ft 3 in (191 cm)
- Weight: 216 lb (98 kg; 15 st 6 lb)
- Position: Forward
- Shoots: Right
- Suomi-sarja team Former teams: JHT; HC Karlovy Vary
- Playing career: 2016–present

Milan Davídek (born May 16, 1998) is a Czech professional ice hockey forward currently playing for HC Baník Sokolov.

Davídek previously played 25 games for HC Karlovy Vary during the 2016–17 Czech Extraliga season. He also had loan spells with HC Baník Sokolov and HC Slovan Ústí nad Labem before joining the latter on a permanent contract in 2018.

On July 22, 2020, Davídek joined JHT of the Suomi-sarja.
