= David Atkins (disambiguation) =

David Atkins (born 1955) is an Australian dancer, choreographer, music-theatre director and producer.

David Atkins may also refer to:

- David Atkins (actor), British Hollyoaks actor
- David Atkins (businessman) (born 1966), British businessman
- David Atkins (Royal Navy officer) (died 1811)

Dave Atkins may refer to:

- Dave Atkins (actor) (1940–2008), English actor
- Dave Atkins (American football) (born 1949), coach and running back
- Dave Atkins (musician), Australian hip hop artist with Resin Dogs
