= Rajeshwar Shastri Dravid =

Indian translator

- Born: 1899; North West Provinces, India
- Died: 1950 (aged 50–51)
- Occupations: Writer, grammarian, translator
- Known for: Sanskrit literature
- Awards: 1960 Padma Bhushan

Rajeshwar Shastri Dravid (1899 – 1950) was an Indian writer, scholar, grammarian and translator of Sanskrit literature. Dravid (Sanskrit: द्रविड़) is a surname found in the Deshastha Rigvedi Brahmin community who migrated to the states of Maharashtra and Karnataka, India. A significant population has emigrated to Madhya Pradesh and Varanasi among other places.

== Early life ==
Born in 1899 in the Indian state of Uttar Pradesh, he was the author several books in Sanskrit which included Sāṅkhyakārikā, Bhāratīya-rājanīti-prakaśah and R̥ṣikalpanyāsaḥ. His brother, Raja Ram Dravid, was the author of The Problem of Universals in Indian Philosophy, a critique of ancient Indian philosophy. The Government of India awarded him Padma Bhushan, the third highest Indian civilian award, in 1960.

== Bibliography ==
- Īśvarakr̥ṣṇa; Śastrī, Ḍhuṇḍhirāja; Nārāyaṇatīrtha (1977). Sāṅkhyakārikā. Vārāṇasī: Caukhambā Saṃskr̥ta Sīrija Āphisa. OCLC 21026070.
- Drāviḍa, Rājeśvara Śāstrī. Bhāratīya-rājanīti-prakaśah. Puṇyapattanam: Śāradā-gaurava-granthamālā. OCLC 23578223.
- Drāviḍa, Rājeśvara Śāstrī; Śāstrī, Devadatta (1971). R̥ṣikalpanyāsaḥ. Prayāga: Bhāratī Pariṣad. OCLC 17814397.
- Kauṭalya; Drāviḍa, Rājeśvara Śāstrī; Dātāra, Viśvanātha Rāmacandra; Nāgara, Udayakr̥ṣṇa (1974). Kauṭilīyaṃ Arthaśāstraṃ / adhyāyadvayātmakam /saṅgr̥hītā[sic]anusandhātā Viśvanātha Rāmacandra dātāraḥ; anuvādakaḥ Udayakr̥ṣṇa Nāgaraḥ (in Sanskrit). Vārāṇasī: Sŕī Gīrvāṇa Vāgvardhinī Sabhā. OCLC 13883337.
- Vācaspatimiśra; Drāviḍa, Rājeśvara Śāstrī (1989). Ṣaḍdarśanaṭīkākr̥dvācaspatimiśraviracita-Nyāyavārtikatātparyaṭīkāyāḥ (in Sanskrit). Vārāṇasī, Bhārata: Caukhambhā Saṃskr̥ta Saṃsthāna. OCLC 21598699.
- Śarmā, Kedāra; Drāviḍa, Rājeśvara Śāstrī (1977). Nepālamāhātmyam: Skandapurāṇāntargataṃ : Sapariśiṣṭa-ʼPārvatiʼ Hindīvyākhyopetaṃ Vyākhyākāraḥ Kedāranātha Śarmā : Prākkathana-pradātā, Rājeśvaraśāstrī Drāviḍaḥ (in Hindi). Vārāṇasī: Caukhambā Amarabhāratī Prakāśana. OCLC 18202448.
- Kāmandaki; देशपांडे, वि. वि; Draviḍa, Rājeśvaraśāstrī; शंकराचार्य (1958). कामंदकीयनीतिसारः: जयमंगलोपाध्यायनिरपेक्षाभ्यां संवलितः (in Sanskrit). Puṇyākhyapattane: Ānandāśramamudraṇālaye. OCLC 28608824.
- Drāviḍa, Rājeśvara Śāstrī; Dātāra, Viśvanāthaśāstrī; Sampūrṇānanda Saṃskr̥ta Viśvavidyālaya (1996). Pāścāttyabhāratīyarājanītyoh̤ samālocanam. Vārāṇasyām: Sampūrṇānandasaṃskr̥taviśvavidyālaya. OCLC 39130303.
- Udayanācārya; Drāviḍa, Rājeśvara Śāstrī; Śukla, Harirāma; Raghunātha Śiromaṇi; Śaṅkaramiśra; Rāmatarkālaṅkārabhaṭṭācārya (1925). Nyāyācāryaśrīmadudayanācāryaviracitaḥ Ātmatattvavivekaḥ. Benares [Varanasi: Secretary, Chowkhamba Sanskrit Series. OCLC 6878722.
- Udayana; Drāviḍa, Rajeśwara Śāstrī; Upādhyāya, Padmaprasāda; Śāstrī, Ḍhuṇḍhirāja; Varadarāja; Vardhamāna; Megha Ṭhakkura; Rucidattopādhyāya; Dharmadatta (1957). The Nyāya-kusumāñjali of Śrī Udayanāchārya; with four commentaries, the Bodhinī, Prakāśa, Prakāśikā and Makaranda (in Sanskrit). Varanasi: Chowkhamba Sanskrit series Office. OCLC 714224760.
- Śukla, Rājārāma; Sampūrṇānanda Saṃskr̥ta Viśvavidyālaya, eds. (2009). पंडितराजराजेश्वरशास्त्रिद्रविडानां दर्शनिकमवदानम्. Sampurnananda Samskrta Visvavidyalaya. ISBN 978-8172702328.

== See also ==
- Arthashastra
- Tarka-Sangraha
