= Dovydaitis =

- Lithuanian surname
- m.: Dovydaitis
- f.: (unmarried): Dovydaitytė
- f.: (married): Dovydaitienė
- Related names: Davideit

Dovydaitis is a Lithuanian surname. Notable people with the surname include:

- Jonas Dovydaitis (1914–1983), Lithuanian pilot, journalist, writer
- Jurgis Dovydaitis (1907–2001), Lithuanian folklorist
- Kristina Dovydaitytė (born 1985), Lithuanian badminton player
- Pranas Dovydaitis (1886 - 1942), Lithuanian politician and public figure
- Tomas Dovydaitis, Lithuanian badminton player
