= Davey (given name) =

Davey is a masculine given name, frequently a diminutive form (hypocorism) of David. It may refer to:

- Davey Adams, Scottish football goalkeeper from 1903 to 1912
- Davey Allison (1961–1993), American NASCAR race car driver
- Davey Armstrong (born 1956), American retired boxer
- Davey Arthur, Irish folk singer
- Davey Barr (born 1977), Canadian freestyle skier
- Davey Boy Smith (1962–2002), British professional wrestler
- Davey Browne (1986–2015), Australian boxer
- Davey Crockett (baseball) (1875–1961), American baseball player and manager
- Davey Graham, British folk guitarist
- Davey Hall (born 1951), British trade unionist
- Davey Holmes (born 1969), American screenwriter, producer and playwright
- Davey Johnson (born 1943), American former Major League Baseball player and manager
- Davey Johnstone (born 1951), Scottish rock guitarist and vocalist
- Davey Lopes (born 1945), American former Major League Baseball player, manager and coach
- Davey Moore (boxer, born 1933) (1933–1963), American featherweight boxer
- Davey Moore (boxer, born 1959) (1959–1988), American middleweight boxer
- Davey O'Brien (1917–1977), American National Football League quarterback
- Davey Payne (born 1944), English saxophonist
- Davey Watt (born 1978), Australian international motorcycle speedway rider
- Davey Whitney (1930–2015), American college basketball head coach
- Davey Williams (1927–2009), American Major League Baseball player
- Davey Williams (musician) (born 1952), American free improvisation and avant-garde music guitarist
- Davey Wreden (born 1988), American video game developer and writer
