= C. D. David =

Indian writer, poet and columnist

C. D. David (c. 1860 – c. 1920) was a Malayalam-language writer, poet and columnist from what is now Kerala, India. He wrote several articles in the periodicals of the time such as Malayala Manorama , Kerala Patrika, Kerala Sanchari, Nasrani Deepika, Vidyavinodini, Bhashaposhini and Rasikaranjini, as well as published books such as Prabandhamanjari, Prabandhamalika and Kunchan Nambiarude Kaalam. Most of his poetry works were focused on Christian themes while his prose works focused on themes such as morality and household management. The work Kunchan Nambiarude Kaalam is a study on the works of Kunchan Nambiar and is regarded as one of the earliest well-researched scholarly works in Malayalam literature.

== Biography ==
The years of David's birth and death are not precisely known. In Kerala Sahitya Charitram, Ulloor S. Parameswara Iyer mentions that David was born in the Malayalam year 1035 and died in the Malayalam year 1095 based on several assumptions. The corresponding Gregorian years are c.1860 and c 1920.

David was a CMC Christian from Trichur and was the son of Kunnathikara Daniel. He acquired some knowledge of Sanskrit language in childhood and studied English up to matriculation class. At that time, he stayed with his father's brother for some time in Lakkidi. He became a teacher at the Government High School in Trichur and then a Malayalam scholar at the Sikshakrama Pathshala there. He also worked for a short time as co-editor of Devaji Bhimaji's Keralamitram newspaper. He also published several articles in newspapers such as Malayala Manorama, Kozhikodan Manorama, Kerala Patrika, Kerala Sanchari, Paschima Tarakam, Nasrani Deepika and Satyanadakahalam, and in magazines such as Vidyavinodini, Bhashaposhini, Rasikaranjini, Nallishwara Vilasom, etc. He was a close friend of Vidyavinodini's editor C. P. Achutha Menon. After leaving the government service, David worked for a while as the manager of a printing press called Janopakari. He built a house in Wadakkancherry and settled there. He spent his final days there. As a writer, David was active between the period 1891 and 1915.

== Writing ==
Although David was a prose writer, he also wrote poetry. Among his works the following are important:

- Prabandhamanjari: Parts 1, 2 and 3
- Prabandhamalika: Parts 1, 2 and 3
- Arogya Rakshamargam
- Grihabharanam
- Kunchan Nambiarude Kaalam
- Kristotbhavam Ottan Thullal
- Messihacharitrasamrakham Kilipattu
- Sadacharamalika
- Divyopadesham Manjari

Most of David's poetry is centred on Christian themes. The book Kunchan Nambiarude Kaalam is based on the history and works of Kunchan Nambiar. It is regarded as one of the first well-researched books in Malayalam. Several other writers also contributed articles in his book Prabandhamanjari which is a collection of essays in three volumes. In the second part of it, there is an essay by David entitled, Swabhashayum Videshabhashayum (Home Language and Foreign Language). In several of his essays, he promoted the activation of Malayali identity and increased pride in the language. He wrote in of his essays, "Malayalam language is the equal right of everyone in the Malayala rajyam... and must be treated as a community wealth."
