= Davidyan =

Origin
- Meaning: Son of David
- Region of origin: Armenia

Other names
- Variant forms: David, Davidian

Davidyan or Davidian (Armenian: Դավթյան) is an Armenian surname meaning "son of David", thus making it equivalent to Davidson.

Notable people with the surname include:

- Levon Davidian (1944–2009), Iranian parliament member, psychiatrist and professor
- Marie Davidian, American biostatistician
- David Davidyan (born 1997), Russian-Armenian footballer
- Nelson Davidyan (1950–2016), Ukrainian-Armenian Greco-Roman wrestler
- Sarkis Davidian (born 1943), Syrian-born Iranian Armenian Catholic bishop

== See also ==
- Davidian (disambiguation)
- Claim of the biblical descent of the Bagrationi dynasty
