= Davids Island (Nunavut) =

Island in Nunavut, Canada

- Location within Nunavut Location within Canada

Geography
- Location: Admiralty Inlet
- Coordinates: 72°20′N 85°00′W
- Archipelago: Arctic Archipelago

Administration
- Canada
- Territory: Nunavut
- Region: Qikiqtaaluk

Demographics
- Population: Uninhabited

Davids Island is a member of the Arctic Archipelago in the Qikiqtaaluk Region, Nunavut. It is an irregularly shaped Baffin Island offshore island, located in Admiralty Inlet, at the mouth of Fleming Inlet (to its north) and Fabricius Fiord (to its northeast).
