= Viktor Davidenko =

Soviet military engineer and physicist (1914 - 1983)

- Виктор Давиденко
- V. A. Davidenko (1914–83)
- Born: Davidenko, Victor Aleksandrovich (Давиденко, Виктор Александрович); February 26, 1914; Danilovka, Volgograd Oblast, Russia
- Died: February 15, 1983 (aged 68); Chelyabinsk-70, Russia in Soviet Union
- Resting place: Kuntsevo Cemetery
- Citizenship: Soviet Union
- Education: Leningrad Industrial Institute
- Known for: Soviet program of nuclear weapons
- Awards: Order of Lenin (1953, 1956, 1962); Hero of Socialist Labor (1953); Medal For Labor Valor; Order of Red Banner of Labor (1949)
- Scientific career
- Fields: Engineering
- Workplaces: Laboratory No. 2 Ioffe Institute; VNIIEF; JINR

Viktor Aleksandrovich Davidenko (Russian: Виктор Александрович Давиденко; 26 February 1914 – 15 February 1983) was a Soviet engineer in the Soviet program of nuclear weapons, working mainly on military nuclear reactors for fissile materials.

== Early life ==
Davidenko was born on 26 February 1914 in Danilovka, Volgograd Oblast. He studied at the Leningrad Hydrotechnical Institute between 1930 and 1932 while working part-time as an operator at the Kulakov factory. In 1932, Davidenko continued his studies at the Leningrad Industrial Institute, graduating with honors. Starting in 1937, he worked for three years at the Leningrad Institute of Physics and Technology.

In 1940, Davidenko worked part-time as an engineer for Plant No. 379 of the People's Commissariat of Aviation Industry of the USSR. Before he returned to Moscow, Davidenko was evacuated to the Kazan plant No.122 and 149 (under the Commissariat) after the USSR underwent Operation Barbarossa. The details of Davidenko's work at these aircraft factories are mostly unknown.

== Soviet atomic bomb project ==
In May 1943, Davidenko and many other scientists joined Igor Kurchatov's Laboratory No. 2 of the Academy of Sciences of the Soviet Union. He was admired for his knowledge, meticulousness and modesty. From 1943 to 1945, three types of nuclear reactor designs were developed there: heavy water reactors, graphite-water reactors, and uranium-fueled water reactors. Davidenko worked with Georgy Flyorov (the discoverer of spontaneous fission with Konstantin Petrzhak) in studying reactor technology.

In May 1948, Kurchatov's group, together with a number of other scientists, was directed to the All-Russian Scientific Research Institute of Experimental Physics or KB-11 in the closed city of Sarov, Nizhny Novgorod Oblast, as part of the Soviet nuclear weapons program. While there, he witnessed a deception during an unexpected visit by Lavrentiy Beria, the feared head of Soviet security and the politician in charge of the nuclear program under Stalin. Kurchatov was in the middle of querying the beveled edge on a plutonium hemisphere, when – reacting quickly before Beria and his entourage – he directed Yakov Zeldovich to double-check the calculations, which Zeldovich 'confirmed' to Kurchatov's satisfaction shortly afterwards.

Kurchatov put Davidenko in charge of one of three teams working simultaneously on neutron primers for nuclear bombs. The laboratory of the chemist Vitaly Aleksandrovich was selected to continue but Davidenko's laboratory provided equipment. He became director of Department 4 of the 'Installation' – the experimental nuclear research department – in 1952. Starting that year, he had repeatedly and strongly encouraged the theoretical physicists Andrei Sakharov and Zeldovich to pursue the route of atomic implosion to compress thermonuclear fuel for a hydrogen bomb in a two-stage device. In November, he and Sakharov went to a laboratory in Leningrad where preparations were being made to monitor radiation from an upcoming nuclear test. While there, they collected newly-fallen snow to concentrate and analyse for radionuclides from the U.S.'s Operation Ivy test earlier that month at Enewetak Atoll. The concentrate was mistakenly thrown away by another chemist.

Davidenko was already amongst several employees of the Installation who were considered too important to risk flying; for example, in 1953 he returned from preparations at the Semipalatinsk Test Site in Kazakhstan for the RDS-6 device – the first Soviet hydrogen bomb – in chief nuclear weapons designer Yulii Khariton's train carriage with other scientists. After detonation of that device, he was awarded the title Hero of Socialist Labour and in October was awarded the degree of candidate of the physical and mathematical sciences. In January 1955, his suggestions about an atomic implosion as the first stage in a two-stage thermonuclear device were finally accepted by the theorists. On 14 January, Zeldovich wrote a note to Khariton outlining the preliminary design scheme, with the following line: "The A.I. [atomic implosion] idea is due to Viktor Aleksandrovich Davidenko." The introduction to the final report by Sakharov and Zeldovich on 25 June stated, "The participation of V. A. Davidenko was extremely profitable in the discussion of the problem during its early stage (1952)." He became a doctor and professor of physico-mathematical sciences and deputy supervisor of the institute in 1957. In 1959, he stated (privately) a deep admiration for his long-time boss Kurchatov, but insisted that Kurchatov was "first and foremost an 'operator', and what's more, an operator under Stalin." He remained at KB-11 until 1963, when he was seconded to the Kurchatov Institute. Later, he worked at the Joint Institute for Nuclear Research.

He is buried in Kuntsevo Cemetery.

== Awards and legacy ==
- 1949: Order of the Red Banner of Labour.
- 1953: Hero of Socialist Labour and Medal "For Labour Valour".
- 1953, 1956, 1962: Order of Lenin.

In 1984, the city council of Sarov decreed that Theatre Passage be renamed Davidenko Street in his honour.
