= Edward Davson =

Guyanese businessman and baronet

Sir Edward Rae Davson, 1st Baronet, KCMG (14 February 1875 – 6 August 1937) was a Guyanese businessman who was influential in colonial economics. He was the managing director of Messrs. S. Davson & Co., Ltd., a prominent West Indies merchant firm.

== Early life and education ==
Davson was born in British Guyana, the second of four sons of Sir Henry Katz Davson, also born in Guyana, and Ann Helen Miller, of Kinnoull, Perthshire. His father was a London-based Guyana sugar merchant who operated Henry Davson & Sons. The Davson family fled Courland after refusing to take an oath of allegiance to the tsar in 1795; Davson's grandfather, Simon Davson, settled in Guyana.

Davson was educated at Eton.

== Career ==
In addition to his own business, S. Davson & Co., Davson was active in numerous trade organisations, conferences, and committees.

Davson was chairman of the British Empire Producers' Organisation and President of the Federation of Chambers of Commerce of the British Empire, and the founder and first president of the Associated West Indian Chambers of Commerce.

In 1929, he founded the West Indies Conference, also serving as the first president. He was a member of the Empire Marketing Board from 1926 to 1933.

In 1932, he was the British government adviser on colonial trade to the Ottawa Conference. In addition. He represented the Colonies and Protectorates on the Imperial Economic Committee and was a member of the Colonial Development Committee. He was a governor of the Imperial College of Tropical Agriculture, vice-chairman of the board and member of the London Committee of Barclays Bank, and a trustee of the Imperial Institute.

Davson was knighted by King George V in 1919 and created a baronet, of Berbice in the Colony of British Guiana, on 21 January 1927 in the 1927 New Year Honours. He was appointed a Knight Commander of the Order of St Michael and St George (KCMG) in the 1934 Birthday Honours, for services in connection with the economic problems of the Colonies.

== Personal life ==
In 1921, Davson married Margot Elinor Glyn OBE, the daughter of Clayton Louis Glyn and the novelist Elinor Glyn, and had two sons, Geoffrey and Christopher, who succeeded him as the second and third baronets, respectively.

He died in 1937 at his home in Eaton Place, Westminster.

Baronetage of the United Kingdom
New creation	Baronet (of Berbice); 1927–1937	Succeeded by Anthony Glyn
