= Dafydd =

Dafydd is a Welsh masculine given name, related to David, and more rarely a surname. People so named include:

== Given name ==
=== Medieval era ===
Ordered chronologically

- Dafydd ab Owain Gwynedd (c. 1145 – 1203), Prince of Gwynedd
- Dafydd ap Gruffudd (1238–1283), Prince of Wales
  - Dafydd Goch, said to be the illegitimate son of Dafydd ap Gruffudd
- Dafydd ap Gwilym (c. 1315/1320–c. 1350/1370), Welsh poet
- Dafydd ap Llywelyn (1215–1246), Prince of Gwynedd and first Prince of Wales
- Dafydd Bach ap Madog Wladaidd (fl. 1340–1390), Welsh poet
- Dafydd Benfras (fl. 1230–1260), Welsh court poet
- Dafydd Ddu o Hiraddug (died 1371), Welsh poet, grammarian and cleric
- Dafydd Gam (1380–1415), Welsh soldier and nobleman who died at the Battle of Agincourt
- Dafydd ab Ieuan or David Holbache (died 1422/3), Welsh politician
- Dafydd Gorlech (c. 1410–c. 1490), Welsh poet
- Dafydd Llwyd ap Llywelyn ap Gruffudd (Dafydd Llwyd o Fathafarn) (fl. c. 1400–c. 1490), Welsh poet
- Dafydd Nanmor (fl. 1450–1490), Welsh poet
- Dafydd ab Edmwnd (fl. c. 1450–1497), Welsh poet
- Dafydd ap Gruffydd (poet) (fl. c. 1600), Welsh poet

=== Modern era ===
Ordered alphabetically

- Dafydd Trystan Davies (born 1974), Welsh academic and politician
- Dafydd Elis-Thomas (1946–2025), Welsh politician
- Dai Henwood (1978–2026), New Zealand stand-up comedian and television host
- Dafydd Hewitt (born 1985), Welsh retired rugby union player
- Dafydd Howells (born 1995), Wales rugby union player
- Dafydd ab Hugh (born 1960), American science fiction author born David Friedman
- Dafydd Ieuan (born 1969), Welsh musician and producer
- Dafydd Ifans (born 1949), Welsh novelist and translator
- David Richards (Dafydd Ionawr) (1751–1827), Welsh poet
- Dafydd Iwan (born 1943), Welsh folk singer and politician
- Dafydd James (born 1975), Wales retired rugby union player
- Dafydd Jenkins (legal scholar) (1911–2012), Welsh barrister, activist, and legal scholar and historian
- Dafydd Jenkins (rugby union) (born 2002), Welsh rugby union player
- Dafydd Jones (disambiguation)
- David Edward Lewis (1866–1941), Welsh businessman and philanthropist
- Dafydd Llywelyn (composer) (1939–2013), Welsh composer, pianist, conductor and teacher
- Dafydd Llywelyn (politician) (born 1976), Welsh politician and Dyfed-Powys Police and Crime Commissioner
- Dafydd Elystan Morgan, Baron Elystan-Morgan (1932–2021), Welsh politician
- Dafydd Rogers (born 1969), West End and Broadway theatre producer
- Dafydd Rowlands (1931–2001), Welsh Congregational minister, lecturer, writer and poet
- Dafydd Stephens (1942–2012), Welsh audiological physician and professor
- Dafydd Wigley (born 1943), Welsh politician
- Dafydd Williams (born 1954), Canadian physician and retired astronaut

== Surname ==
- Catrin Dafydd, Welsh writer, winner of the Crown at the 2018 National Eisteddfod
- Einir Dafydd, Welsh singer who won the third series of the television talent show Wawffactor and the 2007 Cân i Gymru competition
- Fflur Dafydd (born 1978), Welsh novelist, singer-songwriter and musician
- Guto Dafydd (born c. 1990), Welsh writer
- Myrddin ap Dafydd (born 1956), Welsh editor and prifardd (Chief Bard)

== See also ==
- Dewi (disambiguation)
- David (name)
- Dafydd ap Gwilym Society, known as Y Dafydd
- Daffyd Thomas, character in the Little Britain television and radio sketch show
