= Dafydd ap Gruffudd (poet) =

Welsh poet (active c. 1600)

Dafydd ap Gruffudd (c. 1600) was a Welsh poet from the Caer Drewyn area. He is known to have composed didactic verses, such as 'Karol o siample da i wyr ag i wragedd i fyw yn gyttyn ag i ddysgv i plant', but little is known about him generally.
