= Konstantin Davidovsky =

Soviet actor

- Born: Konstantin Davidovsky; 9 March 1882
- Died: 1 March 1939 (aged 56)
- Occupation: Actor
- Years active: 1923–1934

Konstantin Davidovsky (Russian: Константин Давидовский) was a Soviet male actor.

== Selected filmography ==
- 1923 — Red Devils
- 1926 — The Traitor
