= Davidescu =

Davidescu is a Romanian surname. Notable people with the surname include:

- Gheorghe Davidescu (1892–1959), Romanian lawyer and diplomat
- Nicolae Davidescu (1888–1954), Romanian symbolist poet and novelist
