= Davson baronets =

Baronetcy in the Baronetage of the United Kingdom

The Davson Baronetcy, of Berbice in British Guiana, is a title in the Baronetage of the United Kingdom. It was created on 21 January 1927 for Edward Rae Davson.

Edward Rae Davson was Chairman of the Federation of Chambers of Commerce of the British Empire and a member of the Imperial Economic Committee and the Colonial Development Advisory Committee. Davson married Margot Elinor, daughter of Clayton Louis Glyn and his wife, the novelist Elinor Glyn.

He was succeeded by his eldest son, Geoffrey Davson, the second Baronet. Like his maternal grandmother, the younger Davson was an author. In 1957, he assumed the surname of Glyn by deed poll in lieu of his patronymic as well as the additional forename of Anthony. Glyn died in 1998.

Following his death, Anthony Glyn was succeeded by his brother Christopher Davson as the third Baronet.

Christopher Davson died in 2004. His heir apparent was his son George. However, as at 31 January 2014, George Davson had not successfully proved his succession and was not on the Official Roll of the Baronetage, with the baronetcy considered dormant since 2004. In 2016, the present Baronet, Sir George Davson, was able to prove his succession, and therefore the baronetcy is no longer dormant.

== Davson baronets, of Berbice (1927) ==
- Sir Edward Davson, 1st Baronet (1875–1937)
- Sir Anthony Geoffrey Ian Simon Glyn, 2nd Baronet (1922–1998)
- Sir Christopher Davson, 3rd Baronet (1927–2004)
- Sir George Davson, 4th Baronet (born 1964)

The heir apparent is the present holder's son James Davson (born 1990).
