= Dave Houpapa =

New Zealand cricketer (born 1981)

David Wiremu Houpapa (born 14 November 1981) is a former New Zealand first-class cricketer active 2006–2008 who played for Auckland. He was born in Newman, Western Australia.
