= Annie Louise David =

American harpist

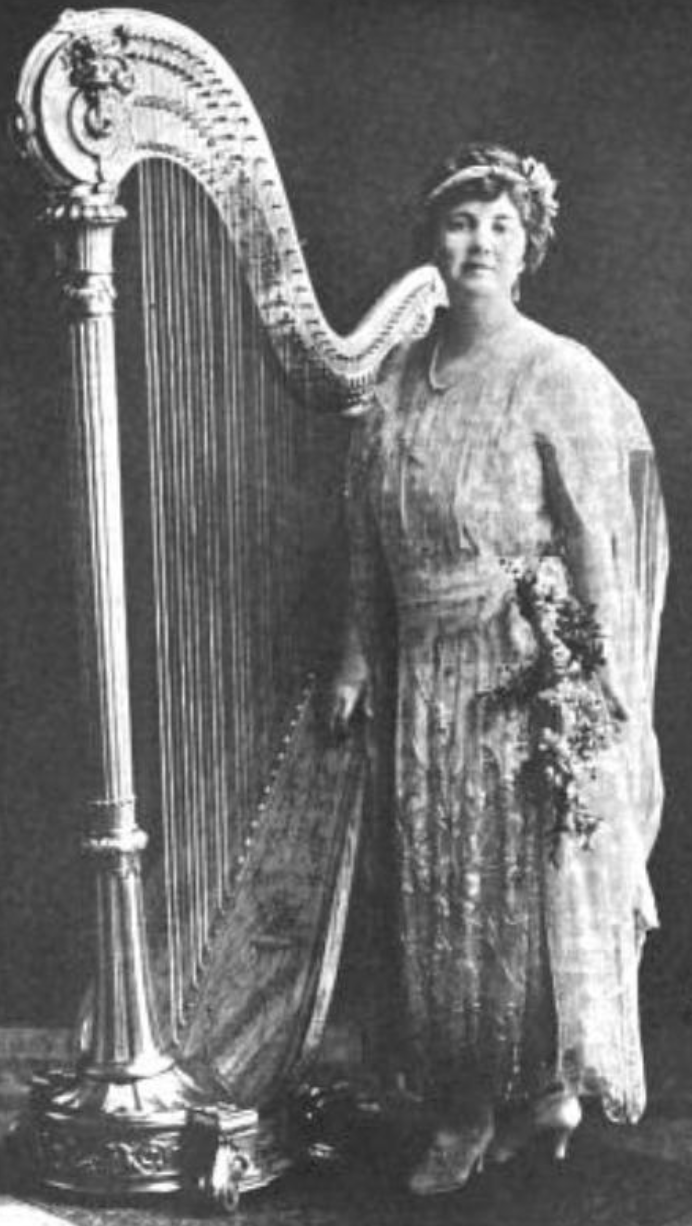
- Annie Louise David, from a 1922 publication
- Born: Annie Louise Berry; October 11, 1877; Boston, Massachusetts
- Died: May 7, 1960 (aged 82); San Francisco, California
- Occupations: Harpist, music educator
- Notable work: Album of Solo Pieces for Harp (1916)

Annie Louise Berry David (October 11, 1877 – May 7, 1960) was an American harpist.

== Early life and education ==
Annie Louise Berry was born in Boston, the daughter of Charles Franklin Berry and Emily Morgan Berry. As a young woman she trained as a pianist with Arthur Foote, Emil Mollenhauer, Heinrich Gebhard, and Edward MacDowell. Her harp training was with Heinrich Schucker of the Boston Symphony Orchestra.

== Career ==
David was a concert harpist, "the complete mistress of her intricate instrument". She was based in New York, then in the San Francisco Bay area from the 1920s. She toured with Alma Gluck, Sarah Bernhardt, Maggie Teyte, Olive Fremstad, and other singers. She played a custom lavender-and-gold harp, and was sometimes promoted as the "Lavender Lady" or "The Lady in Lavender". A 1921 reviewer said that "There is about Miss David's playing a certain refinement and elegance which is truly admirable" and "she was honored with the heartiest and warmest kind of reception".

David was a founding member of the National Association of Harpists, and of the Northern California chapter of the association. She compiled and edited a collection of harp scores, Album of Solo Pieces for the Harp (1916), with works by Beethoven, Hasselmans, Fauré, Donizetti, Sinding, and others. Margaret Hoberg Turrell composed her Concerto in B flat minor for David, and Andre Kostelanetz wrote "Lake Louise" for her.

David also taught harp students, including Anne Everingham Adams, principal harpist for the San Francisco Symphony and San Francisco Opera. She taught a master class in harp instruction at the Cornish School in Seattle in 1922.

== Personal life ==
Berry married her manager, Walter C. David, in 1905; they divorced in the 1910s. She died in 1960, in San Francisco, aged 82 years.
