= Sernovodsky District =

Sernovodsky District Серноводский район (Russian)
- District

Other transcription(s)
  - Chechen: Эна-Хишкан кIошт
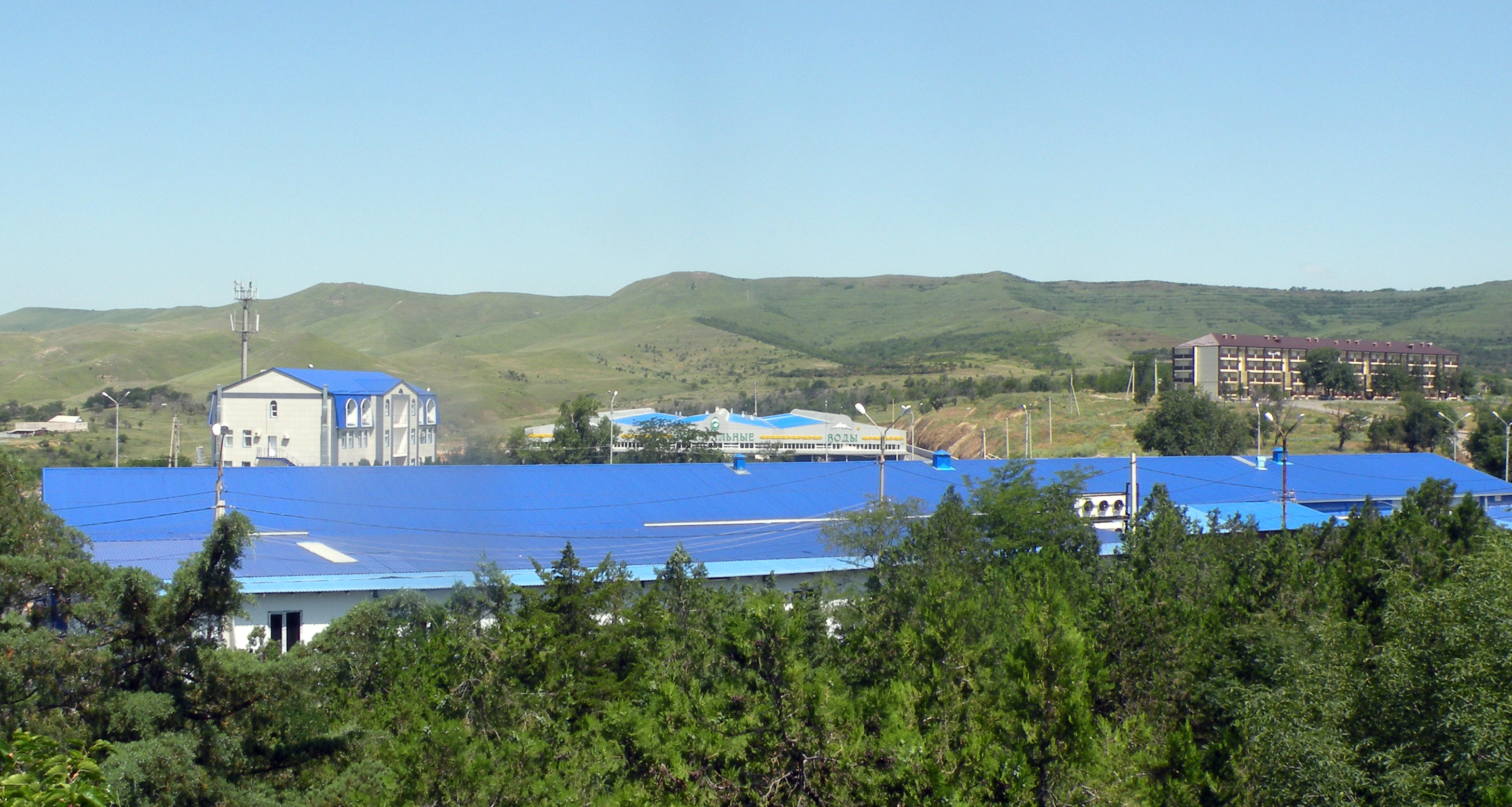
- Resort in Sernovodskoye, Suzhensky District

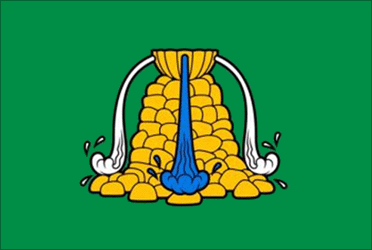
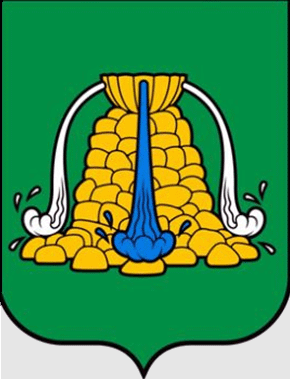
- Flag Coat of arms
- Location of Sunzhensky District in the Chechen Republic
- Coordinates: 43°18′49″N 45°09′01″E
- Country: Russia
- Federal subject: Chechen Republic
- Established: 1920
- Administrative center: Sernovodskoye

Area
  - Total: 450 km^{2} (170 sq mi)

Population (2010 Census)
  - Total: 20,989
  - Density: 47/km^{2} (120/sq mi)
  - Urban: 0%
  - Rural: 100%

Administrative structure
  - Administrative divisions: 2 rural administration
  - Inhabited localities: 2 rural localities

Municipal structure
  - Municipally incorporated as: Sunzhensky Municipal District
  - Municipal divisions: 0 urban settlements, 2 rural settlements
- Time zone: UTC+3 (MSK)
- OKTMO ID: 96631000
- Website: http://www.sunzha-chr.com/

Sernovodsky District (Russian: Серноводский район; Chechen: Эна-Хишкан кIошт, Ena-Xişkan khoşt; 2012-2019: Sunzhensky District) is an administrative and municipal district (raion), one of the fifteen in the Chechen Republic, Russia. It is located in the west of the republic. The area of the district is 450 square kilometers (170 sq mi). Its administrative center is the rural locality (a selo) of Sernovodskoye. Population: 20,989 (2010 census); 20,108 (2002 Census). The population of Sernovodskoye accounts for 51.5% of the district's total population.
