= Davidović =

Davidović (Serbian Cyrillic: Давидовић) is a Serbo-Croatian surname, a patronymic derived from the given name David. It may refer to:

- Branko Davidović (born 1959), footballer
- Dalibor Davidović (born 1972), Croatian musicologist and university professor
- Dimitri Davidovic (born 1944), retired Belgian football player
- Dimitrije Davidović (1789–1838), Serbian politician
- Goran Davidović (born 1968), Serbian doctor and politician
- Ljubomir Davidović (1863–1940), Yugoslav politician
- Miodrag Davidović (born 1957), Montenegrin businessman, economist and politician

== See also ==
- Davidovich
