= Davidoglu =

Davidoglu (from the Turkish surname suffix -oğlu, meaning "son of") is a Romanian surname. Notable people with the surname include:

- Anton Davidoglu (1876–1958), Romanian mathematician
- Cleante Davidoglu (1871–1947), Romanian general
- Mihail Davidoglu (1910–1987), Romanian playwright
