= Maria Jeyarani David =

Malaysian-born missionary

Maria Jeyarani David (born 1951) also known as Maria Susei Mary Jeyarani is an ordained Christian missionary from Malaysia. She is the founder of Trizoom International Mission Inc in Ohio with bases around the world namely, Malaysia, Singapore and India.

Maria was into lecturing and teaching at various academic institutions abroad and later in the United States before she started her "healing ministry" that focuses on miraculous healings of diseases through Jesus, since 1986.

Maria and her husband D.V. David have three children: Alphonso, Joshua and Christerson.

== United Kingdom and Ireland missions ==
Sis. Maria reportedly ventured on missions trip to the United Kingdom and Ireland since early 2007. An Ireland newspaper, Westmeath Topic recently reported on July 3, 2008, describing an unfortunate incident that Maria, was quoted as, having escaped from any major injuries and as a happy person. Maria credits God's protection as having been present all throughout her journeys and Holy Spirit leading the way in her missions endeavours. A local hospital later, confirmed Maria as, perfectly healthy. Her car was however, a "total loss".

In 2012 she was deported from Ireland.
