= Dravida Sangha =

Dravida Sangha was established in 470 CE by a Jain monk named Vajranandi in the city of Madurai in present-day Tamil Nadu. Madurai at that time was under the sway of the Kalabhra rule. According to Prof. George L. Hart, who holds the endowed Chair in Tamil Studies by University of California, Berkeley, and has written that the legend of Tamil Sangam (literary assembly) was based on the Jain assembly (Sangham) at Madurai:

"There was a Jaina assembly called a Sa(n)gha established about 604 AD in Maturai."

== History ==
Dravida Sangha is said to have been established by Vajranandi in 470 CE.

== See also ==
- Tamil Jain
