= Davide =

Davide is a common Galician and Italian given name, and a relatively rare Italian and Filipino surname. Notable people with the name include:

== Given name ==
- Davide Alviti (born 1996), Italian basketball player
- Davide Ancelotti (born 1989), Italian football manager
- Davide Ancilotto (1974–1997), Italian basketball player
- Davide Astori (1987–2018), Italian footballer
- Davide Biale (born 1994), Italian YouTuber and bassist
- Davide Calgaro (born 2000), Italian actor
- Davide Cortini (born 1977), Italian para-cyclist
- Davide Dias (born 1983), Portuguese footballer
- Davide Faraone (born 1975), Italian politician
- Davide Faraoni (born 1991), Italian footballer
- Davide Fragnito (1996), Italian rugby union player
- Davide Frattesi (born 1999), Italian footballer
- Davide Lorenzini (born 1969), Italian diver
- Davide Nicola (born 1973), Italian footballer and manager
- Davide Sanguinetti (born 1972), Italian tennis player
- Davide Santon (born 1991), Italian footballer
- Davide Tizzano (1968–2025), Italian Olympic rower
- Davide Valsecchi (born 1987), Italian racing driver

== Surname ==
- Hilario Davide Jr. (born 1935), Philippine chief justice
- Hilario Davide III (born 1964), Filipino politician

== See also ==
- David (disambiguation)
