= Davy (given name) =

- Gender: Male

Origin
- Origin: Hebrew
- Meaning: beloved

Other names
- Related names: David, Dave, Davey

Davy is a male given name in its own right, as well as a short form (hypocorism) of the name David. Davy may refer to:

== People ==
- Davy Armstrong (born 1991), American soccer player
- Davy Arnaud (born 1980), American soccer player
- Davy Bonilla (born 1973), French jockey
- Davy Brouwers (born 1988), Belgian footballer
- Davy Burnaby (1881–1949), British actor
- Davy Crockett (1786–1836), American folk hero, frontiersman, soldier, and politician
- Davy Force (1849–1918), American Major League Baseball player
- Davy Hyland (born 1955), British politician
- Davy Jones, early stage name of David Jones (1947–2016), better known as David Bowie, English singer, songwriter and actor
- Davy Jones (baseball) (1880–1972), American Major League Baseball player
- Davy Jones (musician) (1945–2012), British musician and actor
- Davy Jones (racing driver) (born 1964), American winner of the 24 Hours of Le Mans in 1996
- Davy Miller, Chicagoan gangster
- Davy Kaye (1916–1998), British actor
- Davy Klaassen (born 1993), Dutch footballer
- Davy Pröpper (born 1991), Dutch footballer
- Davy Rothbart (born 1975), American writer and filmmaker
- Davy Russell (born 1979), Irish jockey
- Davy Russell (politician), Scottish politician
- Davy Sardou (born 1978), French actor
- Davy Walsh (1923-2016), Irish footballer

== Fictional characters ==
- Davy Jones, figure of nautical folklore best known from the idiom "Davy Jones' Locker"
- Davy Jones (Pirates of the Caribbean), from The Pirates of the Caribbean film series, captain of the Flying Dutchman

== See also ==
- Davy (disambiguation)
