= Sheila David =

American chemical biologist

Sheila Sue David
- Education: St. Olaf College; University of Minnesota
- Scientific career
- Workplaces: University of California, Davis; California Institute of Technology; UC Santa Cruz; University of Utah
- Thesis: Spectroscopic studies of inhibitor binding to uteroferrin (1989)
- Website: David Lab

Sheila Sue David is an American chemist who is a professor at the University of California, Davis. Her research uses chemical approaches to understand cellular mechanisms, including DNA repair. She focuses on the repair of damaged DNA bases, which is mediated by base excision repair. The research that she focuses on uses specific DNA glycosylases in order to search meticulously through the normal DNA to find potential mutagenic base modifications. She is a Fellow of the American Chemical Society and American Association for the Advancement of Science.

== Early life and education ==
David became interested in DNA as a child, when she explored the laws of Mendelian inheritance by breeding mice in fifth grade. She converted one of the rooms in her house into a science laboratory. She became interested in biochemistry during her undergraduate degree at St. Olaf College, where she discovered structure-function relationships. David moved to the University of Minnesota for graduate studies, where she investigated inhibitor binding to uteroferrin, completing her doctorate in 1990 under the supervision of Lawrence Que Jr. Next, David moved to California Institute of Technology as an National Institutes of Health Postdoctoral Fellow.

== Research and career ==
David worked as an assistant and associate professor in Santa Cruz and Utah before joining the University of California, Davis in 2006. Her research uses the tools of chemical biology to explore the mechanistic details of DNA repair. DNA is damaged by reactive oxygen species (e.g. the hydroxyl radical), and biological organisms have evolved various strategies for regeneration and repair. In particular, she studies the proteins MUTYH and NEIL1, which help to catalyze the repair of damaged DNA as part of the base excision repair pathway. MUTYH is a glycosylase that identifies and cleaves mismatched nucleobases, which triggers DNA repair. David is interested in how MUTYH locates the appropriate damaged target amidst the naturally occurring healthy DNA, as this may have implications in cancer therapeutics and drug discovery.

== Awards and honors ==
- American Chemical Society Fellow
- American Association for the Advancement of Science Fellow
- Alfred P. Sloan Foundation Fellow
- Editor of DNA Repair
- Environmental Mutagenesis and Genomics Society Education Award
- Beckman Young Investigator Program
- ADVANCE Scholar Award, UC Davis (2018)
- ACS Fellow (2011)
- AAAS Fellow

== Selected publications ==
- Nada Al-Tassan; Nikolas H Chmiel; Julie Maynard; et al. (30 January 2002). "Inherited variants of MYH associated with somatic G:C-->T:A mutations in colorectal tumors". Nature Genetics. 30 (2): 227–232. doi:10.1038/ng828. ISSN 1061-4036. PMID 11818965. Wikidata Q43871566.
- Sheila S. David; Valerie L. O’Shea; Sucharita Kundu (21 June 2007). "Base-excision repair of oxidative DNA damage". Nature. 447 (7147): 941–50. Bibcode:2007Natur.447..941D. doi:10.1038/nature05978. ISSN 1476-4687. PMC 2896554. PMID 17581577. Wikidata Q29615373.
- Sheila S. David; Scott D Williams (1 May 1998). "Chemistry of Glycosylases and Endonucleases Involved in Base-Excision Repair". Chemical Reviews. 98 (3): 1221–1262. doi:10.1021/cr980321h. ISSN 0009-2665. PMID 11848931. Wikidata Q77646696.
- "A zinc linchpin motif in the MUTYH glycosylase interdomain connector is required for efficient repair of DNA damage." Engstrom, L.M., Brinkmeyer, M.K., Ha, Y., Raetz, A.G, Headman, B., Hodgson, K.O., Solomon, E.I., David, S.S.J. Am. Chem. Soc., 2014,136, 7829-32
- Ana P. Gómez-Ramírez; Melody Malek; Estela G. García-González; Sergio E. Campos; Luis G Brieba; Sheila David; C. H. Trasviña-Arenas, "OGG1 and MUTYH DNA Glycosylases, the Dynamic Duo Against 8-Oxoguanine DNA Lesion: Structure, Regulation, and Novel Emerging Roles" Biomolecules, ReaserchGate, February 2026 16(2):257 DOI:10.3390/biom1602025, License: CC BY 4.0
