= List of people with given name David =

The given name "David" may refer to:

== Medieval ==
=== Late antiquity to early medieval ===
David was adopted as a Christian name from at least the 6th century.

- David the Invincible (6th century), Neoplatonic philosopher
- David (commentator) (6th century), Greek scholar
- Saint David (6th century), patron saint of Wales
- David the Dendrite (c. 450–540), a patron saint of Thessaloniki
- David (son of Heraclius) (b. 630), co-emperor of Byzantium
- David Saharuni (7th century), presiding prince of Byzantine-controlled Armenia
- David ibn Merwan al-Mukkamas (d. 937), Arabic philosopher and controversialist, the author of the earliest known Jewish philosophical work of the Middle Ages
- David I of Iberia (d. 881)
- David II of Iberia (d. 937)
- David of Bulgaria (d. 976), Bulgarian noble
- David III of Tao (d. 1000)

=== High medieval ===
- Saint David of Muscovy or Gleb (987–1015), brother of Saint Roman of Muscovy or Boris, and son of Saint Vladimir
- David of Taman, late 10th century Khazar ruler
- David (Da'ud), 11th-century ruler of the Seljuk Turks
- David of Munktorp (died c. 1082)
- David I of Scotland (d. 1153), Roman Catholic saint
- David Kimhi (1160–1235), Medieval rabbi
- David Mac Cerbaill (died 1289), Irish archbishop
- David of Makuria (ruled c. 1268–1272), ruler of Makuria (in what is now Egypt and Sudan)
- David Soslan (d. 1207), Georgian prince
- Kings of Georgia:
  - David IV (d. 1125)
  - David V (d. 1155)
  - David VI (d. 1293)
  - David VII (d. 1270)
  - David VIII (d. 1311)

=== Late medieval and early modern ===
- David, Lord of Brechin (d. 1320)
- David II of Scotland (1324 – 22 February 1371)
- Kings of Georgia:
  - David IX (d. 1360)
  - David X (d. 1526)
  - David XI (d. 1579)
- Davit as a name adopted by Emperors of Ethiopia:
  - David I or Dawit I (1382 – 6 October 1413)
  - David II or Dawit II (1501 – September 2, 1540)
  - David III or Dawit III (8 February 1716 – 18 May 1721)
- David ben Solomon ibn Abi Zimra (1479–1573), Spanish Acharon
- David ben Solomon ibn Yahya (1455–1528), Spanish rabbi
- David ben Yom Tov ibn Bilia, Portuguese-Jewish philosopher
- David Bek (d. 1728), Armenian military commander
- David Davidsz de Heem (1570–1632), Dutch painter
- David ibn Ya'ish (d. 1375), Spanish-Jewish writer
- David Gwyn (fl. 1588), English poet
- David Reubeni (1490–1535/1541?), Jewish political activist and mystic
- David Davidse Schuyler (1669–1715), American fur trader and politician
- David Ungnad von Sonnegg (1535–1600), envoy of Maximilian II, Holy Roman Emperor

== Modern ==
=== A ===
- David Aaker (born 1938), American organizational theorist
- David Aardsma (born 1981), American baseball player
- David Abagna (born 1998), Ghanaian footballer
- David Aaronovitch (born 1954), English journalist
- David Abbasi, Persian-French writer, journalist, and Islamologist
- David Abel (general) (1935–2019), Burmese economist
- David Abel (cinematographer) (1883–1973), Russian-Dutch cinematographer
- David T. Abercrombie (1867–1931), American outdoor expert and founder of Abercrombie & Fitch
- David Abidor (born 1992), American soccer player
- David Abioye, Nigerian author and preacher
- David Abram (born 1957), American ecologist and philosopher
- David Abrard (born 1976), French butterfly swimmer
- David Manker Abshire (1926–2014), American civil servant and NATO representative
- David Abulafia (1949–2026), English historian, academic and author
- David Solomon Abwo (born 1986), Nigerian footballer
- David Accam (born 1990), Ghanaian footballer
- David J. Acer (1949–1990), American dentist
- David Acfield (born 1947), English cricketer and fencer
- David Campion Acheson (1921–2018), American attorney
- David Ackles (1937–1999), American singer-songwriter
- David Ackroyd (born 1940), American actor
- David Acord, American sound editor
- David Kpakpoe Acquaye (born 1928), Ghanaian academic
- David Addington (born 1957), American lawyer
- David I. Adelman (born 1964), American lawyer
- David Adger (born 1967), English professor
- David Adickes (1927–2025), American modernist sculptor
- David Adika (born 1970), Israeli photographer
- David Adjaye (born 1966), Ghanaian-British architect
- David Adjei (born 1977), Ghanaian footballer
- David Adjey (born 1964), Canadian chef
- David Adjmi (born 1973), American playwright
- David E. Adkins, American businessman and politician
- David Aebischer (born 1978), Swiss ice hockey player
- David Aers (born 1946), English professor
- David Affleck (1912–1984), Scottish footballer
- David Afkham (born 1983), German conductor
- David Agard, American professor and medical doctor
- David Agmon (born 1947), Israeli commanding officer
- David Agnew (president), Canadian academic administrator
- David Álvarez Aguirre (born 1984), Spanish-Equatoguinean footballer
- David V. Aguilar (born 1955), American civil servant
- David Agus (born 1965), American medical doctor and author
- David Ahenakew (1933–2010), Canadian indigenous politician
- David H. Ahl (born 1939), American magazine author
- David Aikinhead (1566–1637), 17th-century Scottish lawyer
- David M. Ainsworth (1954–2019), American politician
- David Aja (born 1977), Spanish comic book artist
- David Ajala (born 1986), English actor
- David Ajang (born 1970), Nigerian prelate
- David Ajiboye (born 1998), English footballer
- David "Stringbean" Akeman (1915–1973), American singer-songwriter
- David Akers (born 1974), American football player
- David Akers-Jones (1927–2019), British colonial administrator
- David Bobihoe Akib (1955–2020), Indonesian civil servant
- David Akiba (1940–2019), American photographer
- David Akin, Canadian reporter
- David Akinyooye (born 1989), American basketball coach
- David Akui (1920–1987), American soldier
- David Alaba (born 1992), Austrian footballer
- David Albahari (1948–2023), Serbian writer
- David Albelda (born 1977), Spanish footballer
- David Aldridge (born 1965), American sportswriter
- David Alexanian (born 1967), American director and producer
- David Alford (born 1964), American actor and playwright
- David Almond (born 1951), British author
- David Fernández Alonso (born 1996), Spanish handball player
- David Alpay (born 1980), Canadian actor and musician
- David Alter (1807–1881), American inventor
- David Altmejd (born 1974), Canadian sculptor
- David Alton (born 1951), English politician
- David Alvey, American politician
- David Alward (born 1959), Canadian politician
- David Amaral (born 1950), American psychiatry professor
- David Amber (born 1971), Canadian anchor
- David Ambrose (born 1943), British novelist
- David Amerson (born 1991), American football player
- David Amess (1952–2021), English politician
- David Amoo (born 1991), English footballer
- David Amram (born 1930), American composer and conductor
- David Ancrum (born 1958), American basketball player
- David Andahl (1964–2020), American politician and rancher
- David Anders (born 1981), American television actor
- David Andersen (born 1980), Australian basketball player
- David Andersen (goldsmith) (1843–1901), Norwegian goldsmith
- David Anenih (born 1999), American football player
- David Angell (1946–2001), American screenwriter and television producer
- David A. Ansell (born 1952), Chicago-based medical doctor
- David M. Apatang, American politician
- David Apotheker (1855–1911), Lithuanian humorist
- David Applebaum (1952–2003), American-Israeli medical doctor and rabbi
- David Appleyard (born 1950), British academic
- David Archard (born 1951), British philosopher
- David Archuleta (born 1990), American singer
- David Arellano (1901–1927), Chilean footballer
- David Arenas, Colombian chess grandmaster
- David Argyle, British veterinarian
- David Arkenstone (born 1952), American composer
- David Arkin (1941–1991), American actor
- David Arkin (American football) (born 1987), American football player
- David Armand (born 1977), English comedian
- David Armstrong-Jones (born 1961), English furniture maker and member of the royal family
- Davíð Arnar Ágústsson (born 1996), Icelandic basketball player
- David Arnott (born 1963), American actor and screenwriter
- David Whitehorn Arnott (1915–2004), British linguist
- David Aronson (1923–2015), American painter
- David Arora (born 1952), American mycologist
- David Arquette (born 1971), American actor, director and producer
- David Arseneault (born 1953), American basketball coach
- David Arseneault Jr. (born 1986), American-Canadian basketball coach
- David Arshakyan (born 1994), Armenian footballer
- David Artell (born 1980), English footballer
- David Arumugam (born 1950), Malaysian singer
- David Asante (1834–1892), Ghanaian native missionary
- David Asante-Apeatu (born 1957), Ghanaian forensic specialist
- David Asheri (1925–2000), Italian-Israeli historian
- David Åslin (born 1989), Swedish ice hockey player
- David Asman (born 1954), American television news anchor
- David Asper (born 1958), Canadian lawyer and businessman
- David E. Aspnes (born 1939), American physicist
- David Asscherick (born 1972), Australian pastor
- David Assing (1787–1842), Prussian physicist and poet
- David Aston (born 1953), New Zealand actor
- David Atanga (born 1996), Ghanaian footballer
- David Rice Atchison (1807–1886), American politician
- David Manyok Barac Atem (1959–2021), South Sudanese military figure
- David Atherton (baker) (born 1983), English baker
- David Atrakchi (born 1977), Yugoslavian-American actor
- David Attenborough (born 1926), English broadcaster and naturalist
- David Attewell, (born 1974), English basketball player
- David Atwell (born 1965), Canadian criminal
- David Atwood (1815–1889), American politician and publisher
- David Aubry (born 1996), French swimmer
- David Auburn (born 1969), American playwright
- David Aucagne (born 1973), French rugby union footballer
- David B. Audretsch (born 1954), American economist
- David Auerbach, American writer and software engineer
- David Aufhauser (born 19..), American lawyer,General Counsel of the United States Department of the Treasury
- David Augsburger (born 1938), American author
- David Auker, British film and television actor
- David Aukin (born 1942), British theatrical and executive producer
- David Aune (born 1939), American New Testament scholar
- David Ausberry (born 1987), American football player
- David Ausubel (1918–2008), American psychologist
- David Autor (born 1967), American economist
- David Avanesyan (born 1988), Russian boxer
- David Avellan, American grappler and mixed martial artist
- David Avery (born 1986), British film and television actor
- David Avnir (born 1947), Israeli professor
- David Avshalomov (born 1946), American classical composer
- David Aworawo (born 1968), Nigerian professor
- David Awschalom (born 1956), American physicist
- David Axe, American military correspondent
- David Axmark (born 1962), Swedish software developer
- David Axon (1951–2012), English astrophysicist
- David Ayala (footballer, born 2002) (born 2002), Argentine footballer
- David Ayer (born 1968), American filmmaker
- David Ayrapetyan (born 1983), Armenian-Russian boxer
- David Ayres (born 1977), Canadian ice hockey player
- David Azéma (born 1960), French businessman
- David Azin (born 1990), German-Armenian footballer
- David Azrieli (1922–2014), Canadian real estate tycoon
- David Azulai (1954–2018), Israeli politician
- David Azzi (born 1981), Lebanese-Canadian football player

=== B ===
- David Baan (1908–1984), Dutch lightweight boxer
- David Baas (born 1981), American football player
- David Baazov (1883–1947), Georgian religious figure
- David Bada (born 1994), German American football player
- David Backes (born 1984), American ice hockey player
- David Baddiel (born 1964), English comedian
- David Baerwald (born 1960), American singer-songwriter
- David Baev (born 1997), Russian wrestler
- David Bagoole (born 1998), Ugandan professional footballer
- David Bailie (1937–2021), South African actor
- David Bakhtiari (born 1991), American football player
- David Baldacci (born 1960), American novelist
- David Bamber (born 1954), English actor
- David Bamigboye (1940–2018), Nigerian military commander and politician
- David Banner (born 1974), American rapper
- David Banney (born 1967), Australian conductor and educator
- David Bannon (born 1963), American criminal
- David J. Bardin (born 1933), American government official
- David Bardsley (born 1964), English footballer
- David Bargh (born 1962), New Zealand racing driver
- David Barksdale (1947–1974), American gang leader
- David Barnea (born 1965), Israeli intelligence officer
- David Park Barnitz (1878–1901), American poet
- David Barons (1936–2018), British horse trainer
- David Bartov (1924–2018), Israeli judge
- David Alan Basche (born 1968), American actor
- David Basset (1687–1701), Merchant active in Newfoundland and New England
- David Baszucki (born 1963), Canadian-American entrepreneur
- David Le Batard (born 1972), American cartoon artist
- David Bateson (born 1960), South African-English actor
- David Batista (footballer) (born 1986), Brazilian footballer
- David Batstone, American journalist
- David Peter Battaglia (1931–2017), American politician
- David Battley (1935–2003), British actor
- David Batty (born 1968), English footballer
- David Bavaro (born 1967), American football player
- David Bawden (1959–2022), American conclavist claimant
- David H. Bayley (1933–2020), American political scientist
- David Bazan (born 1976), American singer-songwriter
- David L. Bazelon (1909–1993), American judge
- David Beaird (1952–2019), American director
- David Beasley (born 1957), American politician and diplomat
- David Beatson (1944–2017), New Zealand journalist
- David W. Bebbington (born 1949), British historian
- David Beckett (born 1954), English cricketer
- David Beckham (born 1975), English footballer
- David Bedein (born 1950), American community organizer
- David Bedella (born 1962), American actor
- David Bedford (1937–2011), English composer
- David A. Bednar (born 1952), American religious leader
- David Beecroft (born 1955), American actor
- David Begelman (1921–1995), American film producer
- David Begnaud (born 1983), American journalist
- David T. Beito (born 1956), American historian
- David Belasco (1853–1931), American theatrical producer
- David Bellamy (1933–2019), British author and environmental campaigner
- David Bellavia (born 1975), American soldier
- David Belle (born 1973), French founder of Parkour
- David Bellon, American lieutenant general
- David Bellos (1945–2025), British academic, translator and biographer
- David Bellotti (1943–2015), British politician
- David Belove, American-Brazilian guitarist
- David Benavidez (born 1996), American-Mexican boxer
- David Ben Dayan (born 1978), Israeli football player
- David Bendeth (born 1954), English producer
- David Ben-Gurion (1886–1973), Israeli politician and Prime Minister
- David Benioff (born 1970), American writer
- David Benoit (born 1953), American musician
- David Berkowitz (born 1953), American Satanic serial killer and arsonist
- David Benatar (born 1966), South African philosopher
- David Refael ben Ami (1950–2020), Israeli singer
- David Bender, American political activist and author
- David Bennent (born 1966), Swiss actor
- David G. Benner (born 1947), Canadian professor
- David Berard (born 1970), American ice hockey coach
- David Berenbaum, American screenwriter
- David Berg (1919–1994), American religious figure
- David Bergland (1935–2019), American politician
- David Beriáin (1977–2021), Spanish journalist
- David Berlinski (born 1942), American author
- David Bernhardt (born 1969), American politician and lobbyist
- David Bernhardt (ice hockey) (born 1997), Swedish ice hockey player
- David Beukelman (1943–2022), American speech-language pathologist
- David Bevington (1931–2019), American literary scholar
- David Bey (1957–2017), American boxer
- David Beynon, Welsh rugby union footballer
- David Beynon (teacher) (1919–1966), Welsh teacher
- David Bezmozgis (born 1973), Canadian writer and filmmaker
- David Bianculli, American TV critic and columnist
- David Bianchi, American-Brazilian actor
- David Bickler (born 1953), American musician
- David Biddle (born 1985), Canadian rugby union footballer
- David Bieber (born 1966), American convicted murderer
- David Bierk (1944–2002), Canadian-American painter
- David Binder (1931–2019), English-American journalist
- David Bing (born 1943), American basketball player and politician
- David Binn (born 1972), American football player
- David Binney (born 1961), American saxophonist
- David Birkin (born 1977), British artist
- David Bird (journalist) (c. 1959–2014), American journalist
- David Birney (1939–2022), American actor
- David Biro (born 1964), American medical doctor and writer
- David Bisbal (born 1979), Spanish singer-songwriter
- David Bischoff (1951–2018), American writer
- David F. Bjorklund (born 1949), American professor
- David Theodore Blaauw, American professor
- David Blackbourn (born 1949), English professor
- David Blackwell (1919–2010), American mathematician
- David Blaine (born 1973), American illusionist
- David Blanasi (c. 1930 – disappeared 2001), Aboriginal Australian didgeridoo master
- David Blankfein-Tabachnick (born August 6, 1971), American legal scholar and law professor
- David Blatner (born 1966), American writer and speaker
- David Blatt (born 1959), Israeli-American basketball player and coach
- David Blay Jr. (born 2003), American football player
- David B. Bleak (1932–2006), American soldier
- David Bleakley (1925–2017), Northern Irish politician
- David Bleakley (cricketer) (1817–1882), English cricketer
- David Blech (born 1955), American businessman
- David Blei, American professor
- David W. Blight (born 1949), American professor
- David Blitz, American philosophy teacher
- David Blitzer (born 1969), American investor and sports team owner
- David M. Blitzer (born 1948), American economist
- David Blixt (born 1973), American author
- David Blocker (born 1955), American film producer
- David Bloom (1963–2003), American television journalist
- David Bloor (born 1942), British sociologist
- David Blough (born 1995), American football player and coach
- David Blu (born 1980), Israeli-American basketball player
- David Blume, American permaculture teacher
- David Blumenthal (born 1948), American health care policy expert
- David Blunkett (born 1947), British politician
- David Boat (born 1959), American voice actor
- David Sarpong Boateng (1943–c. 2016), Ghanaian politician
- David Boaz (1953–2024), American executive and author
- David Bobin (1945–2017), English sports journalist
- David Bodanis (born 1950), American speaker and advisor
- David Bodian (1910–1992), American medical scientist
- David Boe (1936–2020), American organist
- David Bohm (1917–1992), American scientist
- David Boies (born 1941), American lawyer
- David Bolstad (1969–2011), New Zealand woodchopper
- David Bomberg (1980–1957), British painter
- David Bonderman (1942–2024), American businessman
- David Bonetti (1947–2018), American art critic
- David Bonior (born 1945), American politician
- David Booker (born 1954), Australian sculptor
- David Boon (born 1960), Australian cricket umpire
- David Boreanaz (born 1969), American actor
- David Borrero (born 1988), American politician
- David Borthwick (born 1962), Scottish shinty player
- David Borwein (1924–2021), Canadian mathematician
- David Bossie (born 1965), American political activist
- David Bostock (diplomat) (1948–2016), British diplomat
- David Bostock (philosopher) (1936–2019), British philosopher
- David Boston (born 1978), American football player
- David Bote (born 1993), American baseball player
- David Dean Bottrell (born 1959), American actor and comedian
- David Boudia (born 1989), American diver
- David Boui (born 1988), Central African taekwondo practitioner
- David Bouley (1953–2024), American chef and restaurateur
- David Renaud Boullier (1699–1759), Dutch philosopher and minister
- David Bowens (born 1977), American football player
- David Bowie (1947–2016), British singer-songwriter
- David Boyer, American politician
- David Box (1943–1964), American rock musician
- David A. Boxley (born 1952), American artist
- David Braben (born 1964), British video game developer
- David Brabham (born 1965), Australian racing driver
- David Brain (born 1964), Zimbabwean cricketer
- David Brainerd (1718–1747), American missionary
- David Braley (1941–2020), Canadian businessman and politician
- David Brancaccio (born 1960), American radio journalist
- David Branch (fighter) (born 1981), American mixed martial artist
- David Brant, American special agent
- David Braybrooke (1924–2013), American political philosopher
- David Brearley (1741–1790), American judge
- David Breashears (1955–2024), American mountaineer and filmmaker
- David Breda (footballer, born 1971)
- David Breda (footballer, born 1996)
- David S. Bredt, American molecular neuroscientist
- David Brekalo (born 1998), Slovenian footballer
- David A. Brennen, American lawyer
- David Brenner (1936–2014), American comedian and actor
- David A. Brent, American psychiatrist
- David Andrew Brent (born 1981), Canadian actor
- David Brewster (1781–1868), British scientist
- David Brian (1914–1993), American actor
- David Brickett (born 1950), South African cricketer
- David Brickner (born 1958), American Baptist minister
- David Bridges (born 1982), English footballer
- David Brierly (1935–2008), English actor
- David Brillembourg (1942–1993), Venezuelan economist
- David Brin (born 1950), American scientist and author
- David Brinkley (1920–2003), American newscaster
- David Brits (born 1997), South African rugby union footballer
- David Brock (born 1962), American political consultant
- David S. Broder (1929–2011), American political commentator
- David C. Broderick (1820–1859), American attorney and politician
- David Broecker (born 1961), American executive
- David Brog (born 1966), American attorney
- David Broll (born 1993), Canadian ice hockey player
- David Brom (born 1971), American mass murderer
- David Bromberg (born 1945), American singer-songwriter
- David Bromberg (born 1981), Hendrix’s Dad, Red Sox fan.
- David Bromstad (born 1973), American television personality
- David Broncano (born 1984), Spanish comedian
- David J. Bronczek (born 1954), American businessman
- David Bronstein (1924–2006), Soviet chess player
- David Broockman, American political scientist
- David Brooks (commentator) (born 1961), American journalist, commentator, editor
- David Brooks (inventor), American inventor
- David Brooks (American politician) (1756–1838), American politician
- David Brooks (rugby union) (1924–2002), British Lions & England international rugby union player
- David Brooks (author) (born 1953), Australian writer
- David Brooks (rugby league) (born 1962), Australian rugby league footballer
- David Brooks (actor) (1915–1999), American actor
- David Brooks (ice hockey) (born 1939), American retired ice hockey player
- David Brooks (footballer) (born 1997), Wales international footballer
- David Brooks (artist) (born 1975), American artist
- David Brooks (lord mayor) (1864–1930), English politician, Lord Mayor of Birmingham 1917–1919
- David Brooks (Northern Irish politician), British politician, Democratic Unionist party member
- David H. M. Brooks (1950–1996), South African philosopher
- David Owen Brooks (1955–2020), American serial killer
- David Brower (1912–2000), American environmentalist
- David Brown, multiple people
- David Broza (born 1955), Israeli singer-songwriter
- David Brubeck (1920–2012), American jazz pianist and composer
- David K. E. Bruce (1898–1977), American diplomat, intelligence officer and politician
- David Brumbaugh (1960–2017), American businessman and politician
- David Bryan (born 1962), American singer-songwriter
- David Brydon (born 1996), New Zealand field hockey player
- David Buchsbaum (1929–2021), American mathematician
- David Buck (1936–1989), English actor
- David Buckel (1957–2018), American lawyer
- David Buckley (born 1976), British composer
- David P. Buckson (1920–2017), American lawyer and politician
- David Budbill (1940–2016), American poet and playwright
- David Buehler (born 1987), American football player
- David Buffett (born 1942), American political figure
- David Buggy (born 1975), Irish hurler
- David Godoy Bugueño (1944–2007), Chilean chess player
- David Bullard (born 1952), South African columnist
- David Bullard (politician), American politician
- David Bullock (entrepreneur) (born 1993), American entrepreneur
- David Bulow (1980–2021), American soccer player
- David R. Bunch (1925–2000), American writer
- David Bunevacz (born 1968), Filipino-American businessman and model
- David Burkette, American politician
- David Burks (born 1943), American academic president
- David Burnford (1915–1984), British doctor and rower
- David Burnham (1933–2024), American journalist
- David Burnside (born 1951), Northern Irish politician
- David Burnside (footballer) (1939–2009), English footballer
- David Burritt (born 1955), American businessman
- David Burtka (born 1975), American actor and chef
- David D. Busch (born 1947), American photographer
- David Buskin (born 1943), American singer-songwriter
- David Busst (born 1967), English football manager
- David Bustamante (born 1982), Spanish singer-songwriter
- David Byas (born 1963), English first-class cricketer
- David Byerman, American politician
- David Bystroň (1982–2017), Czech footballer
- David Byrne (born 1952), Scottish-American musician
- David Byrne (criminal) (died 2016), Irish criminal

=== C ===
- David Cabán (born 1993), Puerto Rican soccer player
- David Caesar (born 1963), Australian television director
- David Cage (born 1969), French video game designer
- David Calderisi (born 1940), Canadian actor
- David Cale, English-American playwright
- David Call (born 1982), American actor
- David Callaham (born 1977), American screenwriter
- David Callahan (born 1964/1965), American writer and editor
- David Callister (1935–2020), Manx politician and broadcaster
- David Cameron (born 1966), British politician
- David Camm, American state trooper
- David Campagna (1946–2017), American actor
- David Canary (1938–2015), American actor
- David Caneda (born 1970), Spanish footballer and manager
- David Cannadine (born 1950), British author and historian
- David Canter (born 1944), English psychologist
- David Capel (1963–2020), English cricketer
- David Caplan (1964–2019), Canadian politician
- David Cárcamo (born 1970), Honduran footballer
- David Cardwell, British engineer
- David Cardwell (civil servant) (1920–1982), British civil servant
- David Carmel (born 1955), Israeli computer scientist
- David Carney (born 1983), Australian footballer
- David Caron (1952–2018), American professor
- David Carradine (1936–2009), American actor
- David Carrasco (born 1944), American academic historian
- David Carreira (born 1991), Portuguese singer
- David Carritt (1927–1982), British art historian, dealer and critic
- David Carroll, multiple people
- David Caruso (born 1956), American actor
- David Casas (born 1971), American politician
- David Casasnovas (born 1979), Spanish footballer
- David Casassas (born 1975), Spanish academic
- David Caspe (born 1978), American film and television writer
- David Cassidy (1950–2017), American singer-songwriter
- David Castañeda (born 1989), Mexican-American actor
- David Castilla (born 1977), French footballer
- David Castro (born 1996), American actor
- David Castro (swimmer) (born 1964), Head of the Cross Fit Company
- David Catania (born 1968), American politician and lawyer
- David Catling, American professor
- David Catrow (born 1952), American artist and illustrator
- David Cavanagh (1964–2018), Irish writer
- David Cavazos (born 1985), Mexican singer-songwriter
- David Caves (born 1979), Northern Irish actor
- David Celermajer (born 1961), Australian cardiologist
- David Celia (born 1973), Canadian singler-songwriter
- David Cerda (born 1961), American playwright
- David Černý (born 1967), Czech sculptor
- David Cerullo (born 1952), American televangelist
- David Cervinski (1970–2019), Australian footballer
- David Cesarani (1956–2015), British historian
- David Cesarini, American economist
- David Chalian (born 1973), American journalist
- David Chalmers (born 1966), Australian philosopher
- David Charlesworth (born 1951), English Catholic abbot
- David Chartrand (born 1960), Canadian politician and activist
- David Charvet (born 1972), French actor and model
- David Chase (born 1945), American screenwriter
- David Chaussinand (born 1973), French hammer thrower
- David Chaum (born 1955), American computer scientist
- David Cheng (born 1989), American racing driver
- David K. Cheng (1918–2012), Chinese professor and electrical engineer
- David Cheriton (born 1951), Canadian computer scientist
- David A. Cherry (born 1949), American artist
- David Chesky (born 1956), American pianist
- David Chesnoff (born 1955), American attorney
- David Chesworth (born 1958), English-Australian composer
- David Abraham Cheulkar (1909–1981), Indian actor
- David Chiang (born 1947), Hong Kong actor
- David Chibana (born 1993), Japanese kickboxer
- David Hatcher Childress (born 1957), American author
- David Childs (1941–2025), American architect
- David Chilton (1951–1997), American pastor
- David Chilton (businessman) (born 1961), Canadian author and investor
- David Chingunji (1945–1970), Angolan politician
- David Chipman, American law enforcement officer
- David Chipperfield (born 1953), English architect
- David Chisum (born 1970), American actor
- David Chiu, several people
- David Choby (1947–2017), American prelate
- David Chocarro (born 1980), Argentine baseball player and model
- David Chodounsky (born 1984), American alpine skier
- David Choe (born 1976), American artist
- David Choi (born 1986), American musician
- David Chokachi (born 1968), American actor
- David Chong, Singaporean lawyer
- David Choquehuanca (born 1961), Bolivian politician
- David A. Christian (born 1948), United States Army captain
- David Chu, several people
- David Cicilline (born 1961), American politician
- David Cienciala (born 1995), Czech ice hockey player
- David Ciente (born 1989), Romanian composer and producer
- David Civera (born 1979), Spanish singer
- David Claessen (born 1959), Dutch cinematographer
- David Clayton-Thomas (born 1941), Canadian singer-songwriter
- David I. Cleland (1926–2018), American engineer
- David Clement-Davies (born 1964), British author and sculptor
- David Judson Clemmons, American musician
- David Clendenin (1790–1817), American soldier and politician
- David Ramsay Clendenin (1830–1895), American teacher and soldier
- David Clendon (born 1955), New Zealand politician
- David Clennon (born 1943), American actor
- David Clewell (1955–2020), American poet and writer
- David Cliche (1952–2020), Canadian politician
- David Clifford (born 1999), Irish Gaelic footballer
- David Climer (1953–2020), American sports reporter
- David Cliss (born 1939), English footballer
- David Clohessy, American spokesman
- David Cloke (born 1955), Australian rules footballer
- David Clopton (1820–1892), American politician
- David Clowney (born 1985), American football player
- David Cloyd (born 1974), American singer-songwriter
- David Cluett (1965–2005), Maltese footballer
- David Clyde (born 1955), American baseball player
- David T. Clydesdale (born 1954), American musical artist
- David H. Coar (born 1943), American judge
- David Cobham (1930–2018), British producer
- David Coffin, American folk musician
- David Cohn (born 1995), Israeli-American basketball player
- David X. Cohen (born 1966) American television writer
- David Colander (1947–2023), American economist
- David Coldrick, Gaelic football referee
- David Čolina (born 2000), Croatian footballer
- David Collings (1940–2020), English actor
- David Collins (interior designer) (1955–2013), Irish architect
- David Colmer (born 1960), Australian writer and translator
- David Colston, American politician
- David Coltart (born 1957), Zimbabwean lawyer
- David Combe (1943–2019), Australian politician
- David Cone (born 1963), American baseball player and color commentator
- David Conrad (born 1967), American actor
- David Consuegra (1939–2004), Colombian graphic designer
- David Consunji (1921–2017), Filipino businessman
- David P. Cooley (1960–2009), American test pilot
- David Copeland (footballer) (1875–1931), English footballer
- David Y. Copeland III (1931–2019), American politician
- David Cordani (born 1966), American business executive
- David Corenswet (born 1993), American actor
- David Corfield, British philosopher
- David Corkery (born 1972), Irish rugby union footballer
- David Corkill (born 1960), British lawn bowler
- David Corley Jr. (born 1980), American football player and coach
- David Cormand (born 1974), French politician
- David Cormican (born 1981), Canadian television executive
- David Corn (born 1959), American political journalist
- David Cornell (born 1991), Welsh footballer
- David Cornstein (born 1938), American politician and diplomat
- David Coromina (born 1974), Spanish footballer
- David Barron Corona (1963–1997), Mexican gangster
- David Corrêa (1937–2020), Brazilian singer-songwriter
- David Correia, American scholar and activist
- David Corwin, American psychiatrist
- David Costabile (born 1967), American actor
- David Costas (born 1995), Spanish footballer
- David Côté (politician) (1915–1969), Canadian politician
- David Côté (Canadian football) (born 1996), Canadian football player
- David Cotton (born 1950/1951), American businessman
- David Cotton (ice hockey) (born 1997), American ice hockey player
- David Coulthard (born 1971), Scottish Formula One racer
- David Coursin, American politician
- David Coverdale (born 1951), British vocalist
- David Crabb (born 1975), American actor
- David Crabtree, American television anchor
- David Cracknell, British journalist
- David Craighead (organist) (1924–2012), American organist
- David Crellin (born 1961), English actor
- David Cretney (born 1954), Manx politician and entrepreneur
- David Crighton (1942–2000), British mathematician
- David Crisafulli (born 1979), Australian politician
- David Crocker (academic) (born 1937), American professor
- David Crockett (wrestling) (born 1946), American pro wrestling announcer
- David Crombie (born 1936), Canadian politician
- David Cromer (born 1964), American theatre director
- David Cromwell (born 1962), British oceanographer
- David Cronenberg (born 1943), Canadian film director
- David Moore Crook (1914–1944), British fighter pilot
- David Crouch (historian) (born 1953), Welsh historian and academic
- David Croudip (1958–1988), American football player
- David Crouse (born 1971), American writer and teacher
- David Crowder (born 1971), American Christian rock singer
- David H. Crowley (1882–1951), American politician
- David Cryer (born 1936), American actor and singer
- David Crystal (born 1941), British linguist
- David Cubitt (born 1965), English-Canadian actor
- David Cuddy (born 1952), American politician and businessman
- David Cuka (born 1992 or 1993), Albanian-Austrian photojournalist, documentarian, and transgender rights activist
- David Culley (born 1955), American football coach
- David Culver (1924–2017), Canadian businessman
- David Cunliffe (born 1963), New Zealand politician
- David Currier (born 1952), American alpine skier
- David Curry (born 1944), British politician
- David Curson (born 1948), American politician
- David Cutcliffe (born 1954), American football coach
- David Cutler (born 1965), American economist and professor
- David Cynamon (born 1963), Canadian executive and sports owner
- David Cyrus (born 1989), Grenadian footballer

=== D ===
- David Dabydeen (born 1955), Guyanese-English novelist and diplomat
- David Dacko (1930–2003), Central African politician
- David Dale (1739–1806), Scottish industrialist
- David Kenneth Hay Dale (1927–2001), British colonial administrator
- David Daleiden (born 1989), American anti-abortion activist
- David Dalglish (born 1984), American writer
- David Dallas (born 1982), New Zealand artist
- David Damrosch (born 1953), American historian
- David Damschen, American politician
- David d'Angers (1788–1856), French sculptor
- David Michael Daniel (born 1960), American poet
- David Danielson (1947–2021), American politician
- David Danzmayr (born 1980), Austrian conductor
- David Darcy (1943–2020), Australian rules footballer
- David Darom (1943–2021), Israeli marine biologist
- David Dastmalchian (born 1977), American actor
- David Datuna (born 1974), Georgian-American artist
- David Daubney (born 1947), Canadian politician
- David Daughtry (born 1975), American gospel musician
- David Davalillo (born 2002), Venezuelan baseball player
- David Davidar (born 1958), Indian novelist and publisher
- David David-Weill (1871–1952), French-American banker
- David Davidyan (born 1997), Russian-Armenian footballer
- David Dawood (born 1981), English disc jockey and songwriter
- David DeCastro (born 1990), American football player
- David DeCoteau (born 1962), American-Canadian director
- David Defiagbon (1970–2018), Nigerian boxer
- David de Gea (born 1990), Spanish footballer
- David Degtyarev (born 1996), Kazakhstani Paralympic powerlifter
- David Deida (born 1958), American author
- David Dein (born 1943), English sports owner and executive
- David DeJesus (born 1979), American baseball player
- David de Keyser (1927–2021), English actor
- David Dekker (born 1998), Dutch cyclist
- David Della Rocco (born 1952), American comedian
- David Dellinger (1915–2004), American activist and writer
- David Dellucci (born 1973), American baseball player
- David Del Rio (born 1987), American actor
- David DeLuise (born 1971), American actor
- David DeMille, American physicist
- David Deming (born 1954), American geologist
- David Deming (economist), American economist
- David Denman (born 1973), American actor
- David Denning, British epidemiologist
- David Denson (born 1995), American baseball player
- David H. DePatie (1929–2021), American producer
- David Depetris (born 1988), Argentine-Slovak footballer
- David Deptula (born 1952), American Lieutenant General
- David Desrosiers (born 1980), Canadian musician
- David Deutsch (born 1953), British physicist
- David Devant (1868–1941), English magician
- David Dewey (born 1956), American painter
- David Dewhurst (born 1945), American politician and businessman
- David DeWitt (born 1948), American computer scientist
- David Dhawan (born 1955), Indian film director
- David Diamante (born 1971), American ring announcer
- David DiChiera (1935–2018), American composer
- David Dickey (born 1945), American statistician
- David Diehl (born 1980), American football player
- David DiFrancesco (born 1949), American inventor
- David Dillehunt (born 1984), American film director and television producer
- David L. Dill (born 1957), American computer scientist
- David Dillie, American politician
- David Dillon (born 1951), American business executive
- David Dimbleby (born 1938), British TV commentator
- David Dinkins (1927–2020), American politician
- David Diop (1927–1960), French poet
- David Diop (novelist) (born 1966), French novelist
- David Diosa (born 1992), Colombian footballer
- David DiPietro (born 1960), American politician
- David Diringer (1900–1975), British linguist
- David Doak (born 1967), Northern Irish video game designer
- David Dobrik (born 1996), Slovak-American YouTube personality
- David Dockery (born 1952), American religious and educational figure
- David S. Dodge (1922–2009), American politician
- David Dolan (boxer) (born 1979), English boxer
- David Dolan (pianist) (born 1955), Israeli pianist
- David Dolníček (born 1979), Czech ice hockey player
- David Doman, American electrical engineer
- David Domgjoni (born 1997), Kosovan footballer
- David Domina (born 1950), American lawyer and politician
- David Dondero (born 1969), American singer-songwriter
- David D'Or (born 1965), Israeli singer
- David H. Dornsife (born 1944), American businessman
- David Doster (born 1970), American baseball player
- David Doubilet (born 1956), American photographer
- David Dougherty (1967–2017), New Zealand convicted criminal
- David Douillet (born 1969), French judo athlete
- David B. Douthett (1840–1927), American politician
- David Dowdy, American epidemiologist
- David Dowell, American scientist
- David Dowler (born 1967), American serial killer
- David Dozier (born 1949), American professor
- David Drábek (born 1970), Czech playwright
- David Dragunsky (1910–1992), Soviet officer
- David Draiman (born 1973), American singer-songwriter
- David Draper (1942–2021), American bodybuilder
- David Drasin (born 1940), American mathematician
- David Dreier (born 1952), American entrepreneur
- David Dreman (born 1936), Canadian investor
- David Dreshaj (born 1999), Albanian singer
- David Dreyer, American politician
- David Driskell (1931–2020), American artist
- David Driver (born 1962), American singer-songwriter
- David Droga (born 1968), Australian executive
- David M. Dror, American health specialist
- David Drumm (born 1966), Irish accountant and banker
- David Drysdale (born 1975), Scottish golfer
- David Duarte (born 1995), Brazilian footballer
- David Dubinsky (1892–1982), American labor leader
- David Duchovny (born 1960), American actor
- David Duffield (born 1940), American businessman
- David W. Dugan (born 1960), American judge
- David Dukes (1945–2000), American actor
- David Kojo Duku (1920–??), Ghanaian politician
- David Dunhill (1917–2005), English radio announcer
- David du Plessis (1905–1987), South African minister
- David Đurak (born 2000), Slovenian footballer
- David Durand (historian) (1680–1763), English minister
- David Durand (actor) (1920–1998), American actor
- David Durden (born 1998), American football player
- David Durenberger (1934–2023), American politician
- David Dushman (1923–2021), Russian soldier
- David Duval (born 1971), American golfer
- David Dvořáček (born 1992), Czech ice hockey player
- David Dworkin (born 1934), American musician
- David Dwyer (born 1964), Australian rules footballer
- David Dyzenhaus, Canadian jurist and law professor
- David Dzakhov (born 1988), Russian footballer
- David Dziobkowski, American officer
- David Dziurzynski (born 1989), Canadian hockey player

=== E ===
- David Eades, British journalist
- David Eady (born 1943), British judge
- David Eagleman (born 1971), American neuroscientist
- David Eagles (born 1935), British test pilot
- David Eaglin, American air force general
- David Easter (born 1959), English actor
- David Eastman (born 1945), Australian public servant
- David Easton (1917–2014), Canadian-American political scientist
- David Eastwood (born 1959), British academic
- David Ebershoff (born 1969), American writer
- David Ebersman (born 1969), American businessman
- David Ebo (1950–1993), American singer
- David Eby (born 1977), Canadian lawyer and politician
- David Eckert (born 1991), German politician
- David Eckstein (born 1975), American baseball player
- David Eddings (1931–2009), American fantasy writer
- David Edgerton (1927–2018), American entrepreneur
- David Edgerton (historian) (born 1959), English historian and professor
- David Edvardsson (born 2002), Swedish footballer
- David Effron, American conductor
- David Egan (1954–2016), American singer-songwriter
- David Egan (jockey) (born 1999), Irish jockey
- David Egbo (born 1998), Nigerian footballer
- David Egerton (1961–2021), English rugby union footballer
- David Egerton (British Army officer) (1914–2010), British army officer
- David Ehrenfeld (born 1938), American professor
- David Ehrenstein (born 1947), American film critic
- David J. Eicher (born 1961), American editor and writer
- David Eick (born 1968), American writer
- David Eigenberg (born 1964), American actor
- David Eisenbach, American historian
- David Eisenbud (born 1947), American mathematician
- David Eisenhower (born 1948), American author and professor
- David Glen Eisley (born 1952), American singer-songwriter
- David Ejoor (1932–2019), Nigerian army officer
- David Eldon (born 1945), former chairman of The Hongkong and Shanghai Banking Corporation Limited
- David Ellefson (born 1964), American musician
- David Romero Ellner (??–2020), Honduran journalist
- David Emerson (born 1945), Canadian politician
- David Emerson (cricketer) (born 1961), American cricketer
- David F. Emery (born 1948), American politician
- David Emge (1946–2024), American actor
- David Emslie (born 1955), South African cricketer
- David England (rower) (born 1956), Australian rower
- David Enoch (1901–1949), Israeli chess player
- David Enoch (philosopher), British philosopher
- David Enrich (born 1979), American journalist
- David Eppstein (born 1963), American computer scientist
- David Epston (born 1944), New Zealand therapist
- David Erskine (1???–1611)
- David Esquer (born 1965), American baseball coach
- David Essex (born 1947), English singer-songwriter
- David Esterly (1944–2019), American sculptor
- David Eto'o (born 1987), Cameroonian footballer
- David Estudillo (born 1973/1974), American judge
- David L. Eubanks (born 1935), American preacher
- David Evangelista (born 1968), American fashion contributor
- David Everett (1770–1813), American newspaper editor
- David M. Ewalt (born 1976), American journalist
- David Eyges (born 1950), American cellist
- David Eyres (born 1964), English footballer

=== F ===
- David Fa'alogo (born 1980), New Zealand rugby league footballer
- David Fabricius (1564–1617), German pastor
- David Fagen (1875–1???), African-American soldier
- David Fahm, Zambian-British actor
- David Fahrenthold (born 1978), American journalist
- David Fair (born 1952), American activist
- David Fairchild (1869–1954), American botanist
- David Fairhurst (1906–1972), English footballer
- David Faitelson (born 1968), Israeli-Mexican journalist
- David Fajgenbaum (born 1985), American author
- David Fales (born 1990), American football player
- David Falk (born 1950), American sports agent
- David Fall (1902–1964), American diver
- David Fane (born 1966), New Zealand actor
- David Farabee (born 1964), American politician
- David Farinango (born 2000), Ecuadorian swimmer
- David Farr (born 1955), American business executive
- David Farragut (1801–1870), American naval officer
- David Farrant (born 1960), New Zealand cricketer
- David P. Farrington (1944–2024), British criminologist
- David Farrier (born 1982), New Zealand journalist
- David Fasenfest (born 1949), American sociologist
- David Fasold (1939–1998), American marine officer
- David Faustino (born 1974), American actor
- David Feao (born 1990), Tongan rugby union footballer
- David FeBland, American artist
- David Fechheimer (1942–2019), American private investigator
- David Fedderly (born 1953), American tuba player
- David Feeney (born 1970), Australian politician
- David Feffer (born 1956), Brazilian businessman
- David Feherty (born 1958), British golfer
- David B. Fein (born 1960), American attorney
- David Sidney Feingold (1922–2019), American biochemist
- David Feiss (born 1959), American animator
- David Feldberg (born 1977), American golfer
- David Felder (born 1953), American composer
- David L. Felten (born 1948), American neuroscientist
- David Fenech (born 1969), French musician
- David Fenton (born 1953), American businessman
- David Fergusson (1944–2018), New Zealand psychologist
- David Fernley (1934–2009), South African cricketer
- David Ferrant (born 1963), South African cricketer
- David Ferreira (born 1979), Colombian footballer
- David Ferrer (born 1982), Spanish tennis player
- David Ferrie (1918–1967), American pilot
- David Ferrucci, American academic researcher
- David Feuerwerker (1912–1980), French rabbi
- David Ffrangcon-Davies (1855–1918), Welsh baritone opera singer
- David Fieldhouse (1925–2018), English historian
- David Fielding (born 1955), American politician
- David Fierro, American actor
- David Fifita (rugby league, born 1989), Tongan rugby league footballer
- David Fifita (rugby league, born 2000), Australian rugby league footballer
- David Figlio (born 1970), American economist
- David Filo (born 1966), American businessman
- David Fincher (born 1962), film director
- David George Findlay (1913–1982), Surinamese politician
- David Finkelhor (born 1947), American sociologist
- David Finkelstein (1929–2016), American medical doctor and professor
- David Firman, British conductor
- David First (born 1953), American composer
- David Firth (born 1983), English animator
- David Fischerov (born 1998), Austrian weightlifter
- David Fishwick (born 1971), English businessman
- David Fiske, American author
- David Fisman, Canadian health professor
- David Fithian (born 1964), American academic executive
- David Fiuczynski (born 1964), American jazz guitarist
- David Fizdale (born 1974), American basketball coach
- David Flair (born 1979), American wrestler
- David Flaschen (born 1951), American soccer player
- David Flatman (born 1980), English rugby union footballer
- David Flavius (born 1972), Saint Lucian footballer
- David Fleay (1907–1993), Australian naturalist
- David Fleet (born 1954), Canadian politician
- David Fleischaker (born 1944), American businessman
- David Flex (born 1987), American wrestler
- David Flint (born 1938), Australian academic
- David Flockhart (1952–2015), Scottish medical researcher
- David Flood (footballer) (born 1969), Australian rules footballer
- David Flood (organist), British organist
- David Floyd (born 1951), American politician
- David Fluellen (born 1992), American football player
- David Flusfeder (born 1960), American-British author
- David Flusser (1917–2000), Israeli professor
- David Foenkinos (born 1974), French author
- David B. Fogel (born 1964), American computer engineer
- David Folkenflik (born 1969), American reporter
- David Folsom (born 1947), American judge
- David Fonseca (born 1973), Portuguese musician
- David Fontana (1934–2010), British psychologist
- David Foot, Canadian demographer
- David Foot (journalist) (1929–2021), British journalist
- David Forden (1930–2019), American intelligence officer
- David Foreman (1946–2022), American environmentalist and author
- David Forman, English entrepreneur and stuntman
- David Forman (general) (1745–1797), American general
- David Forsberg, American politician
- David Forst (born 1976), American baseball executive
- David Foucault (born 1989), Canadian gridiron football player
- David J. Foulis (1930–2018), American mathematician
- David Foxon (1923–2001), English bibliographer
- David Frakes (born 1976), American engineer
- David J. R. Frakt, American lawyer and officer
- David Fralick (born 1962), American actor
- David Franco (born 1985), American actor and filmmaker
- David A. Frank-Kamenetskii (1910–1970), Soviet physicist
- David Frankfurter (1909–1982), Croatian Jew
- David Frankham (born 1926), English actor
- David Fraser-Hidalgo (born 1969), Ecuadorian-American politician
- David Frawley (born 1950), American Hindu teacher
- David Fray (born 1981), French pianist
- David Frazee, Canadian cinematographer
- David Frederick (born 1961), American attorney
- David Freese (born 1983), American baseball player
- David Freiberg (born 1938), American musician
- David Freiheit (born 1979), Canadian YouTuber
- David Freitas (born 1989), American baseball player
- David Freud (born 1950), British politician
- David Fricke (born 1952), American music journalist
- David Fried (born 1962), American artist
- David Friedrichsfeld (1755–1810), German-Jewish writer
- David Fries, American scientist
- David Friesen (born 1942), American bassist
- David Friess (born 1968/1969), American politician
- David Frigerio (born 1970), American screenwriter
- David Friio (born 1973), French footballer
- David Frith (born 1937), British sports writer and historian
- David Frizzell (born 1941), American singer
- David Frockt (born 1969), American politician
- David B. Frohnmayer (1940–2015), American attorney
- David Froman (1938–2010), American actor
- David Fromkin (1932–2017), American author
- David Frost (1939–2013), British television host
- David Frum (born 1960), Canadian-American political writer
- David Frye (1933–2011), American comedian
- David Fubini, American professor
- David Fuhrer (born 1960), American entrepreneur
- David Fulcher (born 1964), American football player
- David Füleki (born 1985), German comic artist
- David Fuller (born 1954), British murderer and necrophile
- David Fumero (born 1972), Cuban-American actor
- David Fung (born 1983), Canadian pianist
- David D. Furman (1917–2008), American lawyer and judge
- David Furness, American military officer
- David Furnish (born 1962), Canadian filmmaker
- David Furr, American actor
- David Fury (born 1959), American television writer
- David Fusitu'a (born 1994), New Zealand rugby league footballer
- David Fuster (born 1982), Spanish footballer
- David Fynn, British-Irish actor

=== G ===
- David Gadsby (1947–2019), British physiologist
- David Gagen (born 1953), English speedway racer
- David Gahan (born 1962), English singer-songwriter
- David Gaider (born 1971), Canadian writer
- David Gaither (born 1957), American politician
- David Galenson (born 1951), American professor
- David A. Gall (1941–2021), Canadian jockey
- David Gallagher (born 1985), American actor
- David Gallegos, American politician
- David Gallo (born 1966), American scenic designer
- David H. Gambrell (1929–2021), American attorney and politician
- David R. Gamperl (born 1966), American businessman
- David Gandy (born 1980), English fashion model
- David Gans (1541–1613), German author
- David Gans (musician) (born 1953), American musician
- David Gant (born 1942), Scottish actor
- David F. Gantt (1941–2020), American politician
- David García Mitogo (1990–2023), Equatoguinean footballer
- David Garman (1922–2019), British businessman and inventor
- David Garrard (born 1978), American football player
- David Garrett (born 1980), German violinist
- David Garrick (1717–1779), English actor
- David Garrison (born 1952), American actor
- David Garnett (1892–1981), British writer and publisher
- David Gasman (born 1960), American actor and director
- David Gates (born 1940), American singer-songwriter
- David Gaudu (born 1996), French cyclist
- David Gaughran, Irish writer
- David Gauke (born 1971), British politician
- David Gaunt (born 1944), British professor
- David Gauthier (1932–2023), Canadian-American philosopher
- David Gautreaux (born 1951), American actor
- David Gbenda (born 2000), American football player
- David Geddis (born 1958), English football coach
- David Gedge (born 1960), English musician
- David Geffen (born 1943), American business magnate
- David Geiser (1947–2020), American painter
- David Gelb (born 1983), American director
- David Gelbaum (1950–2018), American businessman
- David Gelernter (born 1955), American computer scientist
- David Geller, American professor and surgeon
- David Gelston (1744–1828), American merchant and politician
- David Gemmell (1948–2006), British author
- David Geovanis, Russian-American businessman
- David Gergen (born 1942), American political commentator
- David Gerrold (born 1944), American science fiction writer
- David Gessner (born 1961), American essayist
- David Gest (1953–2016), American TV producer
- David Ghazaryan (1989–2020), Armenian general
- David Giffin (born 1973), Australian rugby union footballer
- David Gilhooly (1943–2013), American ceramicist
- David Gilliland (born 1976), American stock car racing driver
- David Gillingham (born 1947), American composer
- David Gilmour (born 1946), British rock singer-songwriter
- David R. Gilmour (born 1958), American diplomat
- David Gilreath (born 1988), American football player
- David Ginesta Montes (born 1987), Spanish handball coach and former player
- David Ginger, American physical chemist
- David J. Gingery (1932–2004), American inventor
- David Ginola (born 1967), French footballer
- David Giralt (1959–2020), Cuban long-jumper
- David Girardi (born 1988), American football coach
- David R. Giroux (born 1975), American equity manager
- David Gistau (1970–2020), Spanish journalist
- David Giuntoli (born 1980), American actor
- David Givens (born 1980), American football player
- David Glantz (born 1942), American historian
- David Glasner, American economist
- David Glawe (born 1970), American civil servant
- David Gleeson (born 1966), Irish film director
- David Gleeson (golfer) (born 1978), Australian golfer
- David Gleirscher (born 1994), Austrian luger
- David Glidden (born 1994 or 1995), American politician
- David Gockley (born 1943), American opera administrator
- David C. Godbey (born 1957), American judge
- David Godman (born 1953), British Hindu professor
- David Goel (born 1970), American hedge fund manager
- David Goffin (born 1990), Belgian tennis player
- David Goforth (born 1988), American baseball player
- David L. Goldfein (born 1959), American general
- David Goggins (born 1975), American runner
- David Gogokhia (born 1987), Georgian visual artist
- David Goldblatt (1930–2018), South African photographer
- David Goldblatt (writer) (born 1965), British sports writer
- David Lionel Goldsmid-Stern-Salomons (1851–1925), British author and baronet
- David Golomb (1933–2019), Israeli politician
- David Golumbia (1963–2023), American academic and author
- David Gomberg (born 1953), American businessman and politician
- David Gompert (1945–2024), American government official and diplomat
- David Gonzales (cartoonist) (born 1964), American cartoonist
- David Good (driver) (1933–2017), British hillclimber
- David Gooderson (born 1941), English actor
- David Willoughby Gooding (1925–2019), British professor
- David Goodis (1917–1967), American writer
- David Goodwillie (born 1989), Scottish footballer
- David Goodwillie (author) (born 1972), American novelist
- David Goodwin (born 1992), American ice hockey player
- David Gossett (born 1979), American golfer
- David Gottesman (1926–2022), American businessman
- David Gough (born 1983), Gaelic football referee
- David Gove (1978–2017), American ice hockey player
- David Goverde (born 1970), Canadian ice hockey player
- David Gowan, American politician
- David Gower (born 1957), English cricketer
- David Gower (rugby league) (born 1985), Australian rugby league footballer
- David S. Goyer (born 1965), American filmmaker
- David Gracie (1927–2020), British hurdler
- David Graeber (1961–2020), American anthropologist
- David Graf (1950–2001), American actor
- David Grainger (born 1966), British venture capitalist
- David Grainger (presenter), American businessman and presenter
- David Grann (born 1967), American journalist
- David Gravel (born 1992), American racing driver
- David Greaves (1946–2019), English snooker player
- David Greczek (born 1994), American soccer player
- David Greenwood (born 1957), American basketball player
- David Greetham (cricketer) (born 1975), English cricketer
- David Greetham (textual scholar) (1941–2020), American literary critic
- David Greilsammer (born 1977), Israeli painter
- David Grellier (born 1979), French musician
- David Grene (1913–2002), American professor
- David Gresham (born 1943), South African record producer
- David Grewe (born 1976), American baseball coach
- David Gribble (born 1946), Australian cinematographer
- David Grier (born 1961), American guitarist
- David Alan Grier (born 1956), American actor and comedian
- David Gries (born 1939), American computer scientist
- David Griffin (athlete) (1905–1944), Canadian Olympic athlete and journalist
- David J. Griffiths (born 1942), American physicist
- David Grigoryan (born 1982), Armenian footballer
- David Grigoryan (serviceman) (2000–2020), Armenian serviceman
- David Hieronymus Grindel (1776–1836), Latvian botanist
- David Grinspoon (born 1959), American astrobiologist
- David Grisman (born 1945), American mandolinist
- David Grissom, American guitarist
- David Grizzle, American business executive
- Dávid Gróf (born 1989), Hungarian footballer
- David Groff (born 1950), American poet
- David Groh (1939–2008), American actor
- David Grosso (born 1970), American attorney and politician
- David Groves (born 1942), Australian geologist
- David Grubbs (born 1967), American musician
- David Grubin (born 1944), American filmmaker
- David Grusin (born 1934), American composer
- David Grusky (born 1958), American sociologist
- David Grutman (born 1974), American businessman
- David Guas (born 1975), American chef
- David Guetta (born 1967), French disc jockey
- David Guggenheim, American screenwriter
- David Antón Guijarro (born 1995), Spanish chess player
- David W. Guion (1892–1981), American composer
- David Gulasi, Australian social media figure
- David Gulpilil (1953–2021), Australian traditional dancer
- David Gurfein, American soldier
- David P. Gushee (born 1962), American ethicist
- David Gusta, American football player
- David Guterson (born 1956), American novelist
- David Guttenberg (born 1951), American politician
- David Guttenfelder (born 1969), American photographer
- David Guzmán (born 1990), Costa Rican footballer
- David Gvantseladze (1937–1984), Georgian wrestler
- David Gwillim (born 1948), English actor
- David Gwinnutt (born 1961), British photographer
- David Gwynn (1861–1910), Welsh rugby union footballer
- David Gwynne-James (1937–2012), Welsh cricketer
- David Gyasi (born 1980), British-Ghanaian actor
- David Gyngell (born 1966), Australian businessman

=== H ===
- David Haas (born 1957), American author
- David Habib (born 1961), French politician
- David Hackl (born 1963), Canadian director
- David Hackworth (1930–2005), American journalist and soldier
- David Hadley (born 1964), American businessman and politician
- David Hafler (1919–2003), American audio engineer
- David A. Hafler (born 1952), American neurologist
- David Hagberg (1942–2019), American novelist
- David Hagen (1973–2020), Scottish footballer
- David Warner Hagen (1931–2022), American judge
- David Hager (born 1946), American medical doctor
- David Haggan, American politician
- David Hahn (1976–2016), American amateur nuclear scientist
- David Haig (born 1955), English actor
- David Haigh (born 1977), British lawyer
- David Haines (aid worker) (1970–2014), British aid worker
- David Hair (born 1965), New Zealand writer
- David Hajdu (born 1955), American columnist
- David Hajjar (born 1952), American scientist
- David Hala (born 1989), Australian rugby league footballer
- David Halberstam (1934–2007), American writer
- David Haley (born 1958), American politician
- David Haller (swimmer) (born 1945), British swimmer
- David M. Halperin (born 1952), American theorist
- David Halpern (canoeist) (born 1955), American sprint kayaker
- David Halpern (psychologist) (born 1966), British civil servant and psychologist
- David Hambrick, American professor
- David A. Hamburg (1925–2019), American psychiatrist
- David Hammons (born 1943), American artist
- David Hampton (1964–2003), American con artist and robber
- David Hann (born 1952), American politician
- David Hannah (born 1973), Scottish footballer
- David Hannah (footballer, born 1867) (1867–1???), Irish footballer
- David Anumle Hansen (1923–2008), Ghanaian naval officer
- David Harbour (born 1975), American actor
- David Harney (1947–2019), English footballer
- David Hartt (born 1967), Canadian artist
- David Hasselhoff (born 1952), American actor, singer, songwriter
- David Hatch (1939–2007), English radio producer
- David Hatch (rugby league) (born 1959), Australian rugby union footballer
- David Hatendi (1953–2012), Zimbabwean banker
- David Hathaway (born 1932), British religious figure
- David Haugh (born 1968), American columnist
- David Hauser, American entrepreneur
- David Hauss (born 1984), French triathlete
- David Haussler (born 1953), American bioinformatician
- David Havili (born 1994), New Zealand rugby union footballer
- David Hawthorne (born 1985), American football player
- David Haye (born 1980), British boxer
- David Hayman (born 1948), Scottish film actor and director
- David Hayter (born 1969), Canadian-American actor
- David Hazeltine (born 1958), American pianist
- David Hazony (born 1969), American-Israeli writer
- David Headley (born 1960), American terrorist
- David Heavener (born 1958), American singer-songwriter
- David G. Hebert (born 1972), American musicologist
- David Hedison (1927–2019), American actor
- David Heimbach (1938–2017), American surgeon
- David Hein, Canadian librettist
- David W. Hein, American professor
- David Heinz (born 1980), American film editor
- David Held (1951–2019), British political scientist
- David Helfgott (born 1947), Australian pianist
- David Hellenius (born 1974), Swedish comedian
- David B. Heller (born 1968), American businessman
- David Helpling (born 1969), American guitarist
- David Helwig (1938–2018), Canadian poet
- David Hemblen (1941–2020), English-Canadian actor
- David Hemmings (1941–2003), British actor
- David Hendricks, American businessman
- David Hendrix (born 1972), American football player
- David Henrie (born 1989), American actor
- David A. Hensher (born 1947), Australian transport economist and academic
- David Henson (born 1984), British athlete
- David Hepworth (born 1950), British journalist
- David Herbert (1908–1995), British socialite and writer
- David Herbert (artist) (born 1977), American sculptor
- David Herro (born 1960), American businessman
- David Herron (born 1984), American football player
- David "D. J." Herman (born 2002), American football player
- David Hess (disambiguation), several people
- David Hewlett (born 1968), English-Canadian actor
- David Hewson (born 1953), British author
- David Hey (1938–2016), English historian
- David Heyman (born 1961), English producer
- David Hibbett, American biology professor
- David Hidalgo (born 1954), American singer-songwriter
- David Higgs (born 1957), American organist
- David Hilbert (1862–1943), German mathematician
- David Hiller (born 1953), American lawyer
- David Hilliard (born 1942), American activist
- David Hilliard (photographer) (born 1964), American photographer
- David Hillis (born 1958), American biologist
- David Himmelstein, American medical doctor
- David Hinds (born 1956), British musician
- David Hines (born 1945), English writer
- David Gordon Hines (1915–2000), British colonial officer
- David Hinkley (1944–2019), English statistician
- David Hinton (born 1954), American poet
- David Hirschfelder (born 1960), Australian musician
- David Julian Hirsh (born 1973), Canadian actor
- David Hirshey, American book editor
- David Hite (1923–2004), American clarinetist
- David Hitt (born 1975), American author
- David Hixon (born 1952), American basketball coach
- David Hobby (born 1965), American photographer
- David Hoberman (born 1952), American producer
- David Hockney (born 1937), English painter
- David Hodgkiss (1948–2020), British administrator
- David Hodne, American army general
- David Hodo (born 1947), American singer
- David Hoflin (born 1979), Swedish-Australian actor
- David Hofman (1908–2003), American television presenter
- David Hofmans (1943–2024), American racehorse trainer
- David George Hogarth (1862–1927), British archaeologist
- David Hogg (born 2000), American activist
- David Hoggan (footballer) (born 1961), Scottish footballer
- David L. Hoggan (1923–1988), American professor
- David Hogness (1925–2019), American biochemist
- David Holden (journalist) (1924–1977), English journalist
- David Holden (screenwriter), American television producer
- David Holland (judge), Irish judge
- David F. Holland (born 1973), American professor
- David Hollander (born 1968), American television writer
- David Hollister (1942–2026), American politician
- David Hollister (sport shooter) (1944–2019), Australian sport shooter
- David Holmberg (born 1991), American baseball player
- David Holmgren (born 1955), Australian designer and educator
- David Holoubek (born 1980), Czech football manager
- David Holsinger (born 1945), American composer
- David Holston (born 1986), American basketball player
- David M. Holtzman, American neurologist
- David Holy (born 1979), German designer
- David T. Hon (born 1941), Hong Kong-American physicist
- David Honey (born 1958), Australian politician
- David Honeyford, Northern Irish politician
- David Hood (born 1943), American bassist
- David A. Hood, Canadian physiologist
- David Horler (born 1943), English trombonist
- David Ernest Hornell (1910–1944), Canadian recipient of the Victoria Cross
- David Hornsby (born 1975), American actor
- David Horovitch (born 1945), English Actor
- David Hornik, American venture capitalist and philanthropist
- David Horsey (born 1951), American cartoonist
- David Horsey (golfer) (born 1985), English golfer
- David Horst (born 1985), American soccer player
- David Hosack (1769–1835), American medical doctor
- David Hoselton (born 1968), Canadian screenwriter
- David Hostetler (1926–2015), American sculptor
- David Hostetter (1819–1888), American businessman
- David Hou (born 1943), Taiwanese politician
- David L. Hough (born 1937), American writer
- David Housewright (born 1955), American author
- David Hrčkulák (born 1992), Czech sports shooter
- David Hsieh, Hong Kong-American professor
- David Hsu, American entrepreneur
- David Htan (born 1988), Burmese footballer
- David Hu, cofounder of IIG Capital sentenced to prison for fraud
- David Hu (scientist) (born 1979), American mathematician, roboticist, and biologist
- David Huang (born 1966), Taiwanese politician
- David H. Hubel (1926–2013), Canadian-American neurophysiologist
- David Hubert (born 1988), Belgian footballer
- David Huddleston (1930–2016), American actor
- David Huddleston (gymnast) (born 2000), Bulgarian gymnast
- David Hudgins (born 1965), American television writer
- David Huebner (born 1960), American diplomat
- David Huerta (1949–2022), Mexican poet
- David Huertas (born 1987), Puerto Rican basketball player
- David Huffman (1945–1985), American actor
- David Huizenga, American civil servant
- David Hulse (born 1968), American baseball player
- David Hume (1711–1776), Scottish philosopher
- David Humm (1952–2018), American football player
- David Humphrey (born 1955), American painter
- David Humphries (1953–2020), English cricketer
- David Huntley (1957–2017), Canadian lacrosse player and coach
- David Huntsberger (born 1979), American comedian
- David Hurd (born 1950), American composer
- David Hurles (1944–2023), American pornographer
- David Hurley (born 1953), Australian military man and Governor General (2016–2024)
- David Huron (born 1954), Canadian professor
- David Hurst (1926–2019), German actor
- David W. Hurst (c. 1820s–1882), justice of the Supreme Court of Mississippi
- David Hurtado (born 1999), Ecuadorian racewalker
- David Hussey (born 1977), Australian cricket coach
- David Hussl (born 1992), Austrian sailor
- David Hutcheson (1905–1976), British actor
- David Hutcheson (footballer) (1892–1962), Scottish footballer
- David Huynh (born 1983), Canadian actor
- David Henry Hwang (born 1957), American playwright
- David Hyland (born 1987), American football player
- David Hyman (born 1967), American entrepreneur

=== I ===
- David G. Iadevaia (born 1949), American author
- David Ian (born 1961), British producer and actor
- David Ibarra Muñoz (born 1930), Mexican economist
- David Ibbetson, English legal scholar
- David Ibbotson, missing pilot
- David Icke (born 1952), English conspiracy theorist
- David Ickringill (1930–2012), English wrestler
- David Icove (born 1949), American criminal profiler
- David Iftody (1956–2001), Romanian-Canadian politician
- David Ige (born 1957), American politician
- David Igler, American historian
- David Iglesias, American attorney
- David Ignatius (born 1950), American journalist
- David Ignatoff (1885–1954), Russian-American author
- David Ignatow (1914–1997), American poet
- David Ijaha (born 1990), English footballer
- David Ikanovich (born 1989), Russian footballer
- David Ikard, American professor
- David Ikin (born 1946), English footballer
- David Ilariani (born 1981), Georgian sprinter
- Dávid Illés (born 1994), Hungarian footballer
- David Imlah, Australian curling coach
- David Immerglück (born 1961), American instrumentalist
- David Imms (born 1945), English artist
- David Imonitie (born 1954), Nigerian tennis player
- David Ince (1921–2017), Scottish fighter pilot
- David Indermaur, Australian criminologist
- David Ing (born 1957), Canadian systems scientist
- David Iñigo (1934–2005), Argentine footballer
- David Inshaw (born 1943), English artist
- David Into (1940–2015), American race car driver
- David Iornos, Nicaraguan cyclist
- David Ipp (1938–2020), South African-Australian lawyer
- David Ippolito (born 1945), American singer-songwriter
- David Irons (born 1982), American football player
- David Ironside (1925–2005), South African cricketer
- David Isaacson, American army general
- David Isay (born 1965), American radio producer
- David Iserson (born 1977), American novelist
- David M. Israel (born 1951), American television producer
- David Israelite, American music executive
- David Itkin (born 1957), American conductor and composer
- David Ito (born 1966), Japanese comedian and businessman
- Dávid Ivan (born 1995), Slovak footballer
- David Iverson (born 1969), American Air Force officer
- David Ives (born 1950), American playwright
- David Izatt (1892–1916), Scottish footballer
- David Izazola (born 1991), Mexican footballer
- David Izenzon (1932–1979), American bassist
- David Izonritei (born 1968), Nigerian boxer

=== J ===
- David Jablonski (born 1953), American professor
- David Jacka (born 1968), aviator and disability advocate
- David Jacks (footballer) (born 1948), Australian rules footballer
- David Jacks (businessman) (1822–1909), American businessman
- David Jaco (born 1954), American boxer
- David Jacoby (politician) (born 1956), American politician
- David Stanley Jacubanis (1910–1985), Russian-American criminal and fugitive
- David A. Jaeger, American professor
- David Jaffe (born 1971), American video game designer
- David Jagger (1891–1958), English painter
- David Jahson (1954–2021), Jamaican reggae singer
- David James (1928–1987), American racing driver
- David Jameson (field hockey) (born 1984), Canadian field hockey player
- David Jameson (governor) (1723–1793), American politician
- David Jamison (skier), American para-alpine skier
- David Jamison (politician) (1660–1739), Scottish-American lawyer
- David Janer (born 1973), Spanish actor
- David Jang (born 1949), Korean-American professor
- David Janson (born 1950), English actor
- David Janssen (1931–1980), American actor
- David Jaomanoro (1953–2014), Malagasy writer
- David Jarolím (born 1979), Czech footballer
- David H. Jarvis (1862–1911), American captain in the United States Revenue Cutter Service
- David Jason (born 1940), British actor
- David Jasper (born 1951), English theologian
- David Jassy (born 1974), Swedish musician
- David Javerbaum (born 1971), American comedy writer
- David Jaynes (born 1952), American football player
- David Jefferies (1972–2003), English motorcycle racer
- David Jeffrey (born 1962), Northern Irish football manager
- David Lyle Jeffrey (born 1941), Canadian-American scholar
- David Jelínek (born 1990), Czech basketball player
- David Jemibewon (born 1940), Nigerian Army officer
- David Jeremiah (born 1941), American political writer
- David Jerison (born 1953), American mathematician
- David Jessen (born 1996), Czech artistic gymnast
- David C. Jewitt (born 1958), British-American astronomer
- David Jisse (1946–2020), French musician and producer
- David Johansen (1950–2025), American singer-songwriter
- David Johansson (diplomat) (born 1935), Finnish diplomat
- David Gwilym John (1884–1958?), Welsh cartoonist
- David Joiner (born 1958), American game programmer
- David Jude Jolicoeur (born 1968), American rapper
- David Jolley (born 1948), American musician
- David Jolly (born 1972), American attorney and lobbyist
- David Jonas, American government official
- David Jonkin (1???–1641), Scottish merchant
- David Joris (1501–1556), Belgium Anabaptist leader
- David Joselit, American art historian
- David Jost (born 1972), German music producer
- David W. Jourdan (born 1954), American author
- David Jove (1942–2004), Canadian director
- David Joyner (athletic director), American sports administrator
- David Joyner (actor) (born 1963), American actor
- David Julazadeh, American Air Force general
- David Julius (born 1955), American physiologist
- David Julyan (born 1967), English musician
- David Justice (born 1966), American baseball player

=== K ===
- David Kahalekula Kaʻauwai (1833–1856), American lawyer and politician
- David Kabiller (born 1964), American businessman
- David Kabua (born 1951), Marshallese politician
- David Kaczynski (born 1949), American social figure
- David Kadouch (born 1985), French pianist
- David Kafulila (born 1982), Tanzanian politician
- David Kajganich (born 1969), American screenwriter
- David Kakabadze (1889–1952), Georgian painter
- David Kamau (born 1965), Kenyan boxer
- David Kämpf (born 1995), Czech ice hockey player
- David Karnes (1948–2020), American politician and businessman
- David Karp (born 1986), American entrepreneur
- David Karr (1918–1979), American journalist
- David Kaše (born 1997), Czech ice hockey player
- David Kassan (born 1977), American painter
- David Kato (c. 1964–2011), Ugandan teacher and LGBT rights activist
- David Katzeek (1942–2020), American Tlingit educator and leader
- David Katzenstein (1952–2021), American virologist
- David Kaufman, American actor
- David Kaye, multiple people
- David Kautter, American lawyer
- David Kear (geologist) (1923–2019), New Zealand geologist
- David T. Kearns (1930–2011), American businessman
- David Keck, Canadian author
- David Kedrowski (born 1942), American politician
- David Keene (born 1945), American political consultant
- David Kehr (born 1953), American film critic
- David Keightley (1932–2017), American sinologist
- David Keirsey (1921–2013), American psychologist
- David H. Keller (1880–1966), American writer
- David Kelsey (born 1932), American theologian
- David Kendrick, American drummer
- David Kendziera (born 1994), American runner
- David Hume Kennerly (born 1947), American photographer
- David Sabo Kente (born 1965), Nigerian politician
- David Kenyon, British archaeologist
- David Vreeland Kenyon (1930–2015), American judge
- David Kerley (born 1957), American journalist
- David Kersh (born 1970), American country singer
- David Kershenbaum, American record producer
- David Kestenbaum (born 1969), American radio producer
- David Ketchum (1928–2025), American actor
- David Khakhaleishvili (1971–2021), Georgian mixed martial artist
- David Khan (politician) (born 1974), Canadian politician
- David Khan (diplomat) (1795–1851), English diplomat
- David Kherdian (born 1931), Armenian-American poet
- David Kidwell (born 1977), New Zealand rugby union coach
- David Kiefer (born 1984), American basketball coach
- David Kiki (born 1993), Beninese footballer
- David Kikoski (born 1961), American jazz pianist
- David Kilcullen (born 1967), Australian author
- David Kilgour (1941–2022), Canadian author
- David R. Kingsley (1918–1944), American Air Force officer
- David Leleo Kinimaka (1851–1884), Hawaiian noble
- David Kinkade (born 1983), American musician
- David Kipiani (1951–2001), Georgian footballer
- David Kirch (born 1936), British businessman
- David Kircus (born 1980), American football player
- David Kirk (disambiguation), several people
- David Kirkland (1878–1964), American actor and director
- David Kirschner (born 1955), American producer
- David Kitay (born 1961), American film composer
- David Kitchen (born 1953), South African sailor
- David Kitt (born 1975), Irish musician
- David Kitur (born 1962), Kenyan runner
- David Kladney, American attorney
- David Klamen (born 1961), American artist
- David Klammert (born 1994), Czech judoka
- David Klass (born 1960), American screenwriter and novelist
- David Klavins (born 1954), German-Latvian piano maker
- David Klawans (born 1968), American film producer
- David Kldiashvili (1862–1931), Georgian writer
- David Klech (born 1988), American decathlete
- David Klemmer (born 1993), Australian rugby league footballer
- David Klenerman (born 1959), British chemist
- David Klingler (born 1969), American football player
- David Knezek (born 1986), American politician
- David Knoller (born 1963), American producer
- David Knopfler (born 1952), English musician and guitarist
- David Koch (1940–2019), American businessman and philanthropist
- David Kočí (born 1981), Czech ice hockey player
- David Kocieniewski (born 1963), American journalist
- David Koechner (born 1962), American actor
- David Koepp (born 1963), American screenwriter
- David Koff (1939–2014), American filmmaker
- David Kohan (born 1964), American television producer
- David Kohler (born 1966), American businessman
- David Koker (1921–1945), Dutch philosopher and Holocaust victim
- David A. Kolb (born 1939), American educational theorist
- David Kollar (born 1983), Slovak guitarist
- David Koloane (1938–2019), South African artist
- David Kolomatis (born 1989), American ice hockey player
- David Koma, Georgian fashion designer
- David Komansky (1939–2021), American businessman
- David Komatz (born 1991), Austrian biathlete
- David Konečný (born 1982), Czech volleyball player
- David Kong, Hong Kong businessman
- David Konstan (1940–2024), American classicist
- David Kopay (born 1942), American football player
- David Kopp (born 1979), German cyclist
- Dávid Korányi (born 1980), Hungarian foreign minister
- David Koresh (1959–1993), American cult leader
- David Korins (born 1976), American designer
- David Korten (born 1937), American author and professor
- David Kracov (born 1968), American painter
- David C. Kraemer (born 1955), Israeli theologian
- David Anthony Kraft (1952–2021), American comic book writer
- David Kraiselburd (1912–1974), Argentine journalist
- David Krakauer (musician) (born 1956), American musician
- David Krane, American investor
- David Krathwohl (1921–2016), American psychologist
- David Krause (born 1970), Australian rugby league footballer
- David Krech (1909–1977), Polish-American psychologist
- David Lloyd Kreeger (1909–1990), American philanthropist
- David Kreizman (born 1974), American writer
- David Krejčí (born 1986), Czech ice hockey player
- David Krentz, American artist
- David M. Kreps (born 1950), American game theorist
- David Kretzmer (born 1943), Israeli lawyer
- David Kreuger (born 1967), Swedish songwriter
- David S. Kris (born 1966), American lawyer
- David Kristian (born 1967), Canadian musician
- David Kross (born 1990), German actor
- David Kroyanker (born 1939), Israeli architectural historian
- David Krumholtz (born 1978), American actor
- David Kudler (born 1962), American editor
- David Kudrave (born 1966), American racing driver
- David E. Kuhl (1929–2017), American scientist
- David Paul Kuhn, American author
- David Kuijers (born 1962), South African painter
- David Kuijken, Dutch pianist
- David Kundtz, American self-help author and former Catholic priest
- David Kurten (born 1971), British politician
- David Kushner (born 1968), American writer
- David Kushner (singer-songwriter), (born 2000), American musical artist.
- David Kushnir (1931–2020), Israeli long-jumper
- David Kustoff (born 1966), American politician
- David Vahtangovich Kutaliya (born 1966), Russian lawyer
- David Gottlieb Kuwert (1748–1827), Lithuanian landscaper
- David Kvachadze (born 1951), Georgian light-heavyweight boxer
- David Kvasnička (born 1999), Czech ice hockey player
- David Květoň (born 1988), Czech hockey player
- David P. Kvile (1861–1918), Norwegian teacher, farmer, and politician
- David Kwong (born 1980), American magician
- David Kyle (1919–2016), American writer
- David Kyles (born 1989), American basketball player
- David Kynaston (born 1951), English historian
- David E. Kyvig (1943/1944–2015), American historian

=== L ===
- David Labaree, American historian
- David Labiosa (born 1961), American actor
- David Labrava (born 1962), American actor
- David LaBruyere (born 1969), American musician
- David LaChapelle (born 1963), American photographer
- David Lacy, Scottish minister
- David Lacy-Scott (1920–2020), English cricketer
- David Ladd (born 1947), American actor
- David LaFlamme (1941–2023), American singer
- David LaFleur (born 1974), American football player
- David Lafuente (born 1982), Spanish comic book artist
- David Lagercrantz (born 1962), Swedish journalist
- David Lago (born 1979), Cuban-American actor
- David LaGrand (born 1966), American politician
- David La Haye (born 1966), Canadian actor
- David Laliberté (born 1986), Canadian ice hockey player
- David Lama (1990–2019), Austrian sports climber
- David Lambie (1925–2019), Scottish politician
- David Lammy (born 1972), British politician
- David Lamont (born 1953), Australian politician
- David Lamont (moderator) (1753–1837), Scottish minister
- David Lamptey (died 2012), Ghanaian Politician
- David Lange (1942–2005), New Zealand politician
- David Langton (1912–1994), British actor
- David Land (1918–1995), British theatre producer
- David Lander (1947–2020), American actor and baseball scout
- David Landsberg (1944–2018), American actor
- David Lanz (born 1950), American pianist
- David Lapham (born 1970), American comic book writer
- David G. Larimer (born 1944), American judge
- David Laro (1942–2018), American judge
- David Larsen (born 1980), American actor
- David Larter (born 1940), Scottish cricketer
- David Lascelles (born 1950), English politician and producer
- David Lascher (born 1972), American actor
- David Lassner (born 1954), American computer scientist
- David Lau (born 1966), Israeli rabbi
- David Lauren (born 1971), American businessman
- David Lawrence Jr. (born 1942), American nationally known newspaper editor and publisher
- David Laws (born 1965), British politician
- David Layzer (1925–2019), American astrophysicist
- David Lazar (author) (born 1957), American writer
- David Lazarus, American columnist
- David Lazer, American professor
- David Leake (born 1935), Argentine missionary
- David Lean (1908–1991), English director
- David Leavitt (born 1961), American novelist
- David Le Batard (born 1972), Cuban-American graphic and fine artist
- David Lebe (born 1948), American photographer
- David Lebón (born 1952), Argentine musician
- David Leckie (1951–2021), Australian media manager
- David Ledecký (born 1993), Czech footballer
- David Leebron (born 1955), American attorney
- David Adams Leeming (born 1937), American philologist
- David Lefèvre (cyclist) (born 1972), French cyclist
- David Lefèvre (serial killer) (born 1980), French serial killer
- David Legates, American climatologist
- David Leggio (born 1984), American ice hockey player
- David Legwand (born 1980), American ice hockey player
- David Lehman (born 1948), American poet
- David Leisure (born 1950), American actor
- David Leitch (born 1975), American filmmaker
- David Leite (born 1960), Portuguese-American memoirist
- David Le Marquand (born 1950), English lawn bowler
- David LeNeveu (born 1983), Canadian ice hockey player
- David Lenz (born 1962), American painter
- David Ari Leon (born 1967), American musician
- David Leonhardt (born 1973), American journalist
- David Lepper (born 1945), British politician
- David J. Lesar (born 1953), American businessman
- David Lesperance, American army officer
- David Ovide L'Espérance (1864–1941), Canadian manufacturer and politician
- David Letourneau (born 1989), Canadian squash player
- David Letterman (born 1947), American comedian
- David N. Levinson (1935–2019), American businessman and politician
- David Levinthal (born 1949), American photographer
- David Levithan (born 1972), American author
- David Glenn Lewis, victim of a hit and run
- David Lewiston (1929–2017), English music collector
- David J. Ley (born 1973), American clinical psychologist
- David Leyonhjelm (born 1952), Australian politician
- David Li (born 1939), Hong Kong banker and politician
- David Licauco (born 1994), Filipino actor
- David Licht, American drummer
- David Lichtenstein (born 1960), American businessman
- David Liddell-Grainger (1930–2007), English politician
- David Liddle, American computer developer
- David Liederman (1949–2024), American chef and businessman
- David Lienemann, American photographer
- David Lifton (1939–2022), American author
- David Ligare (born 1945), American painter
- David Lightfoot (1959/1960–2021), Australian producer
- David Lightfoot (linguist) (born 1945), American linguist
- David Lighty (born 1988), American basketball player
- David E. Lilienthal (1899–1981), American attorney and public administrator
- David Liljemark (born 1973), Swedish comic artist
- David Lillard (born 1953), American lawyer and politician
- David Lillehaug (born 1954), American judge
- David Lilly (born 1986), Scottish footballer
- David Lin (born 1950), Taiwanese politician
- David Linarès (born 1975), French footballer
- David Linden (born 1961), American neuroscience professor
- David Linden (politician) (born 1990), Scottish politician
- David J. Lipman, American biologist
- David Lindsay-Abaire (born 1969), American playwright
- David L. Lindsey (born 1944), American novelist
- David Lindsey (politician) (born 1931), American politician
- David Lipper (born 1974), Canadian actor
- David Lipscomb (1831–1917), American minister
- David Lipsky (author) (born 1965), American author
- David Lipsky (golfer) (born 1988), American golfer
- David Lisak, American clinical psychologist
- David Liss (born 1966), American writer
- David Liti (born 1996), New Zealand weightlifter
- David Litvinov (born 1993), Israeli weightlifter
- David R. Liu (born 1973), American chemist and biologist
- David Livermore (born 1980), English footballer
- David Livermore (microbiologist), British microbiologist
- David Livramento (born 1983), Portuguese cyclist
- David Loades (1934–2016), British historian
- David Lobell, American agricultural ecologist
- David Lochary (1944–1977), American actor
- David Lock (born 1960), British politician
- David Lockhart (??–1845), English botanist
- David Loera (born 1998), Spanish-American soccer player
- David Lofton (born 1984), American football player
- David Loggie (born 1957), English footballer
- David Lohr (born 1975), American journalist
- David Loiseau (born 1979), Canadian mixed martial artist
- David Loko, Papa New Guinean rugby player
- David Lomax (born 1970), New Zealand rugby coach
- David Lomax (journalist) (1938–2014), British reporter
- David Longdon (born 1965), British musician
- David Longe-King (born 1995), English footballer
- David Longhurst (1965–1990), English footballer
- David Longmuir, Scottish football executive
- David Longoria (born 1977), American singer-songwriter
- David Longstaff (born 1974), British ice hockey player
- David Longstreth (born 1981), American singer-songwriter
- David B. Loomis (1817–1897), American politician
- David S. Louderback (1851–1911), American politician
- David Lough (born 1986), American baseball player
- David Loughery, American screenwriter
- David Loveday (1896–1985), English bishop
- David K. Lovegren, American film producer
- David Lovelock (born 1938), English physicist and mathematician
- David Lovering (born 1961), American musician and magician
- David Loverne (born 1976), American soccer player
- David Lowenthal (1923–2018), American historian
- David Lowy (born 1954), Australian aviator and musician
- David Loxton (1943–1989), British producer
- David Loy (born 1947), American scholar
- David Elliot Loye (1925–2022), American author
- David Lozano (born 1988), Spanish cyclist
- David Lozano (playwright), American director and playwright
- David Lozeau (born 1975), American artist
- David Lubar (born 1954), American author and video game programmer
- David Lubin (1849–1919), Polish merchant
- David Lubinski, American professor
- David Lucchino (born 1969), American entrepreneur
- David Lunceford (1934–2009), offensive lineman
- David M. Ludlum (1910–1997), American historian
- David Luechtefeld (born 1940), American politician
- David Luenberger (1937–2026), American mathematical scientist
- David Luff (born 1969), Australian journalist
- David Luff (legal academic), Belgian professor
- David Y.H. Lui (1944–2011), Canadian impresario
- David Luiz (born 1987), Brazilian footballer
- David Lujan (born 1965), American politician
- David Luke (1921–2005), British translator
- David Lumsdaine (1931–2024), Australian composer
- David Luneau (born 1965), American politician
- David Luque-Velasco (born 1984), Spanish tennis player
- David Lurie (born 1951), South African photographer
- David Lurie (equestrian) (born 1939), American equestrian
- David Luscombe (1938–2021), British professor
- David Lust (1968–2021), American politician
- David Lutalo (born 1986), Ugandan musician
- David Lvovich (1882–1950), Russian-Jewish politician
- David Lynch (1946–2025), American filmmaker

=== M ===
- David E. Maas (born 1940), history professor at Wheaton College, Illinois
- David Mabuza (born 1960), South African politician
- David Macaulay (born 1946), British-American illustrator
- David MacBeth (born 1935), English singer
- David MacDougall (born 1939), American-Australian anthropologist
- David Macey (1949–2011), English translator
- David Macklin (born 1978), American football player
- David Machado (born 1978), Portuguese writer
- David Maclean (born 1953), British politician
- David MacLennan (1937–2020), Canadian biochemist
- David MacMillan (born 1968), Scottish chemist
- David MacRitchie (1851–1925), Scottish folklorist
- David Maddison (1947–2019), British judge
- David M. Maddox (born 1938), American general
- David Madel (born 1938), British politician
- David Madigan (born 1962), Irish-American statistician
- David Madson (architect) (1963–1997), American gay rights activist and architect
- David Benedito Magalhães (born 1944), Brazilian footballer
- David Magarshack (1899–1977), British translator
- David Magee (born 1962), American screenwriter
- David Magerman (born 1968), American computer scientist
- David Magleby (born 1949), American professor
- David Magley (born 1959), American basketball player and coach
- David Maier (born 1953), American professor
- David Maine (born 1963), American novelist
- David F. Mains (1874–1949), American politician
- David Mainse (1936–2017), Canadian televangelist
- David Zane Mairowitz (born 1943), American writer
- David Maisel, American film producer
- David Maisel (visual artist) (born 1961), American photographer
- David Maister (born 1947), American professor
- David Makhura (born 1968), South African politician
- David Makovsky (born 1960), American professor
- David Malachowski (1955–2022), American guitarist
- David J. Malan, American computer scientist
- David Malebranche (born 1969), Haitian-American doctor
- David Maley (born 1963), American radio analyst
- David Malin (born 1941), British-Australian astronomer
- David Malinowski, American make-up artist
- David Mallett (1951–2024), American singer-songwriter
- David Malouf (1934–2026), Australian poet and writer
- David Malpass (born 1956), American economic analyst
- David Malukas (born 2001), Lithuanian-American race car driver
- David Malyan (1904–1976), Armenian actor
- David Mamet (born 1947), American playwright
- David Mancuso (1944–2016), American disc jockey
- David Mandel (born 1970), American executive producer
- David S. Manners (1808–1884), American politician
- David Manoyan (born 1990), Armenian footballer
- David Zen Mansley, American voice actor
- David Mantell (1934–2017), English cricketer
- David Manzur (born 1929), Colombian painter
- David S. Mao, American law librarian
- David Maraniss (born 1949), American journalist
- David R. Marchant, American geologist
- David Marciano (born 1960), American actor
- David Marconi, American screenwriter
- David Maree (born 1989), South African cyclist
- David Margesson (1890–1965), British politician
- David Margulies (1937–2016), American actor
- David Maroul (born 1983), American baseball player
- David R. Marples (born 1952), Canadian historian
- David Marquet, American naval captain
- David Marrero (born 1980), Spanish tennis player
- David Daniel Marriott (born 1939), American politician
- David Martin-Robinson (born 1999), American football player
- David Martosko (born 1970), American political editor
- David Marus (born 1986), Ugandan long-distance runner
- David G. Marwell (born 1951), American historian
- David Maslanka (1943–2017), American composer
- David Masondo (born 1974), South African politician
- David Massamba (born 1992), Gabonese footballer
- David Masters (born 1978), English cricketer
- David Masterson (born 1998), South African cricketer
- David Matas (born 1943), Canadian legal counsel
- David Mathias (born 1991), Indian cricketer
- David Mathis (born 1974), American golfer
- David Mathison (born 1960), American author and speaker
- David Matranga (born 1975), American voice actor
- David Matsumoto (born 1959), American psychologist
- David Mattingley (1922–2017), Australian pilot
- David Burroughs Mattingly (born 1956), American digital artist
- David Matula (born 1937), American mathematician
- David Matuszak, American writer
- David Matza (1930–2018), American sociologist
- David Maupin, American gallery director
- David Edward Maust (1954–2006), American serial killer
- David Mawutor (born 1992), Ghanaian-Tajikistani footballer
- David R. Mayhew (born 1937), American political scientist
- David Maynier (born 1968), South African politician
- David Mayo (born 1993), American football player
- David Mays, American magazine writer
- David Mazouz (born 2001), American actor
- David Mazzucchelli (born 1960), American comic artist
- David Mba, American academic administrator
- David McAfee (1947–2005), American politician
- David McAlister (1951–2015), English actor
- David A. McAllester (born 1956), American computer scientist
- David McBride (born 1942), American politician
- David McBride (whistleblower) (born 1963/1964), Australian whistleblower
- David McCagg (born 1958), American swimmer
- David McCalden (1951–1990), British far-right activist
- David McCall (bishop) (1940–2021), Australian bishop
- David McCall (businessman) (born 1934), Scottish businessman
- David McCallum (1933–2023), Scottish actor
- David McCampbell (1910–1996), American naval captain
- David McCandless (born 1971), British data journalist
- David McCann (cyclist) (born 1973), Irish cyclist
- David McCarty (born 1969), American baseball player
- David McClelland (1917–1998), American psychologist
- David J. McClements, English food scientist
- David McComb (1962–1999), Australian musician
- David McCord (1897–1997), American poet
- David McCormack (born 1968), Australian singer-songwriter
- David McCormack (basketball) (born 1999), American basketball player
- David McCormick (born 1965), American business executive
- David McCracken (born 1981), Scottish footballer
- David McCrae (1900–1976), Scottish footballer
- David McCray (born 1986), German basketball player
- David B. McCreary (1826–1906), American politician from Pennsylvania
- David McCreery (born 1957), Northern Irish footballer
- David McCullagh (born 1967), Irish journalist
- David McCullough (1933–2022), American author
- David McDermott (born 1988), English footballer
- David McDiarmid (1952–1995), Australian artist and political activist
- David McDonough, American politician
- David McDowell (1963–2014), American psychiatrist
- David McDuling (born 1989), Australian rugby union footballer
- David McDuff (born 1945), British translator
- David McFadzean (born 1949), American producer
- David McFarland, American animal behavior scientist
- David McFarland (politician) (1822–1902), American politician
- David McGee (1947–2023), New Zealand commissioner
- David McGoldrick (born 1987), British-Irish footballer
- David McGreavy (born 1951), English convicted murderer
- David McHugh (born 1955), Irish rugby union referee
- David McIlwraith (born 1967), Canadian actor
- David McIlveen (born 1981), Northern Irish politician
- David Lee McInnis (born 1973), American actor
- David A. McIntee (born 1968), British writer
- David McIntyre (born 1987), Canadian ice hockey player
- David McKeague (born 1946), American judge
- David McKee (1935–2022), British writer
- David McKie (born 1935), British journalist
- David McKienzie (born 1979), American volleyball player
- David D. McKiernan (born 1950), American general
- David McKinley (born 1947), American businessman and politician
- David McKitterick (born 1948), English librarian and academic
- David McKittrick (born 1949), Northern Irish journalist
- David McKnight (1935–2006), Canadian-British anthropologist
- David McLane, American businessman
- David McLeod (born 1971), American football player
- David McMahon (born 1951), Australian rules footballer
- David McMahon (association footballer) (born 1981), Irish footballer
- David McNee (1925–2019), Scottish police officer
- David McPhail (1945–2021), New Zealand actor
- David McPhail (rugby league) (1886–??), New Zealand rugby league footballer
- David McRae, American politician
- David McReynolds (1929–2018), American politician
- David McRobbie (born 1934), Australian writer
- David McSavage (born 1966), Irish comedy writer
- David McTaggart (1932–2001), Canadian environmentalist
- David McVicar (born 1966), Scottish opera director
- David Meade (born 1976), American politician
- David Meade (author), American conspiracy author
- David Medalla (1942–2020), Filipino artist
- David Meece (born 1952), American musician
- David Megginson (born 1964), Canadian software consultant
- David Mehan, Australian politician
- David Mehić (born 1997), Serbian volleyball player
- David Meirhofer (1949–1974), American serial killer
- David Meister (born 1962), American fashion designer
- David Melding (born 1962), Welsh politician
- David Meller (born 1959), British businessman
- David Mendell, American journalist
- David Mendenhall (born 1971), American actor
- David Menkin (born 1977), Norwegian-American actor
- David Méresse (1931–2020), French footballer
- David Merhar, American ice hockey player
- David Merrick (1911–2000), American theatrical producer
- David Messerschmitt (born 1945), American engineer
- David Messina (born 1974), Italian comics artist
- David Metzger (born 1960), American composer
- David Meunier (born 1973), American actor
- David Meyler (born 1989), Irish footballer
- David Micevski (born 1986), Australian footballer
- David Michelinie (born 1948), American comic book writer
- David Michôd (born 1972), Australian film director
- David Milgaard (1952–2022), Canadian criminal
- David Miliband (born 1965), British politician
- David Miller, multiple people
- David Scott Milton (1934–2020), American author
- David Minasian, American film producer
- David Minier (born 1934), American politician
- David Mirkin (born 1955), American director
- David Mirvish (born 1944), Canadian art dealer
- David Miscavige (born 1960), American leader of the Scientology organisation
- David Mixner (1946–2024), American political activist
- David Mizejewski, American naturalist
- David Mlinaric (born 1939), British interior decorator
- David Modell (1960–2017), American sports executive
- David Moffat (1839–1911), American financier
- David M. Moffett (born 1952), American businessman
- David Mogotlane (born 1992), South African cricketer
- David Moos (born 1965), American art curator
- David Moosman (born 1986), American football player
- David Monaghan (1922–1944), New Zealand cricketer and soldier
- David Monahan (born 1971), American actor
- David Monasterio (born 1971), Puerto Rican swimmer
- David Monette, American craftsman
- David Moniac (1802–1836), American military officer
- David Howard Maude-Roxby-Montalto di Fragnito (born 1934), British craftsman
- David Moo (born 1970), American former voice actor
- David Mordaunt (1937–2020), English cricketer
- David Moret (born 1979), Swiss judoka
- David Morrissey (born 1964), English actor
- David Mortensen, American judge
- David Moscow (born 1974), American actor
- David Moses (1925–1999), Welsh rugby union footballer
- David Lokonga Moses, South Sudanese politician
- David Mota (born 1985), Spanish rugby union footballer
- David Mota (footballer) (1942–2015), Venezuelan footballer
- David Moufang (born 1966), German musician
- David C. Mowery (born 1952), American professor
- David Moylan (1874–1942), American member of the Cleveland City Council
- David Moyes (born 1963), Scottish football manager
- David Moyo (born 1994), Zimbabwean footballer
- David Mudd (1933–2020), British politician
- David Muench (born 1936), American photographer
- David Muffato (born 1971), Brazilian racing driver
- David G. Mugar, Armenian-American businessman
- David Muhammad (born 1970), Trinidadian author
- David Muhoozi (born 1965), Ugandan military officer
- David Muir (born 1973), American journalist and news anchor
- David Muise (1949–2017), Canadian politician
- David Mullin, English archaeologist
- David Mumford (born 1937), American mathematician
- David Mundell (born 1962), Scottish politician
- David Mundy (born 1985), Australian rules footballer
- David Mungai (born 1968), Kenyan runner
- David Mungoshi (1949–2020), Zimbabwean novelist
- David Ibarra Muñoz (born 1930), Mexican economist
- David Muntaner (born 1983), Spanish track cyclist
- David Mura (born 1952), American author
- David H. Murdock (1923–2025), American businessman
- David Murillo (born 1993), Colombian footballer
- David Musgrave (born 1965), Australian poet
- David Musila (born 1943), Kenyan politician
- David Musuguri (1920–2024), Tanzanian soldier
- David Musulbes (born 1972), Russian wrestler
- David Mutendera (born 1979), Zimbabwean cricketer
- David Mwiraria (1938–2017), Kenyan minister
- David Myatt (born 1950), British poet and philosopher

=== N ===
- David Nabarro (born 1949), British civil servant
- David Nadien (1926–2014), American violinist
- David R. Nagle (born 1943), American politician and lawyer
- Dávid Nagy (born 1981), Hungarian musician
- David Nahmad (born 1947), Monegasque art dealer
- David Nahmias (born 1964), American judge
- David S. Nahom (born 1966), American lieutenant general
- David Nail (born 1979), American country singer
- David Nainkin (born 1970), South African tennis player
- David Najem (born 1992), American soccer player
- David Nakamura (born 1970), American journalist
- David Nakayama (born 1978), American artist
- David Nakdimen (1933–2020), American journalist
- David Nakhid (born 1964), Trinidadian footballer
- David Nalbandian (born 1982), Argentine tennis player
- David Nance, American guitarist
- David Nangle, American politician
- David Narcizo (born 1966), American musician
- David Narey (born 1956), Scottish footballer
- David Nasaw (born 1945), American author
- David Nascimento (born 1966), Cape Verdean-Portuguese football coach
- David Nason (born 1970), American lawyer and financier
- David Naughton (born 1951), American actor
- David Naylor (born 1954), Canadian physicist
- David J. Naylor (1843–1926), American naval officer
- David Nazarian (born 1961), Iranian-American businessman
- David Nazim (born 1996), Nigerian footballer
- David Ndii, Kenyan economist
- David Nedohin (born 1973), Canadian curler
- David Needham (born 1949), English footballer
- David Neeleman (born 1959), Brazilian-American entrepreneur
- David Neft (born 1937), American writer and historian
- David Neilson (born 1949), English actor
- David Neitz (born 1975), Australian rules footballer
- David Neiwert (born 1956), American journalist
- David Nekrutman (born 1973), American-Israeli Jewish theologian
- David Nelms (born 1961), American businessman
- David Nelson (1936–2011), American actor, director, and producer
- David Nemirovsky (born 1976), Canadian hockey player
- David Nepomuceno (1900–1939), Filipino runner
- David Neres (born 1997), Brazilian footballer
- David Nesbitt (born 1991), Bahamian basketball player
- David Neuhaus (born 1962), Israeli-German religious scholar
- David Neumann (born 1965), American choreographer
- David Neumark (born 1959), American economist
- David Nevue (born 1965), American solo pianist
- David Newhan (born 1973), American baseball player
- David Newsom (born 1962), American actor
- David D. Newsom (1918–2008), American diplomat
- David Newsome (1942–2011), American scientist
- David Ngog (born 1989), French footballer
- David Ngoombujarra (1967–2011), Indigenous Australian actor
- David Nibert (born 1953), American sociologist
- David Niblock (born 1981), Irish Gaelic footballer
- David Nichtern (born 1948), American songwriter
- David Nickson (born 1929), British businessman
- David Nicolle (born 1944), British historian
- David Nied (born 1968), American baseball player
- David Nieto (1654–1728), Italian explainer
- David Niles (1888–1952), American political advisor
- David Nimmer (born 1955), American lawyer and professor
- David Niose (born 1962), American attorney and activist
- David Nirenberg (born 1964), American historian
- David Nish (born 1947), English footballer
- David Nitschmann der Bischof (1698–1772), Czech missionary
- David Niven (1910–1983), English actor
- David Niven Jr. (born 1942), British film producer
- David Njoku (born 1996), American football player
- David ole Nkedianye (born 1963), Kenyan politician
- David Noel (born 1984), American basketball player
- David Nofoaluma (born 1993), Australian rugby league footballer
- David Nohe (born 1952), American politician
- David Noon (born 1946), American composer
- David Norbrook (born 1950), English professor
- David Nordahl (born 1941), American painter
- David Norona (born 1972), Cuban-American actor
- David Norquist (born 1966), American financial manager
- David Norrie (born 1963), American football player
- David Nosek (born 1981), Czech ice hockey player
- David Noton (born 1957), British photographer
- David Nott (born 1956), Welsh surgeon
- David Novarro (born 1959), American television journalist
- David Nualart (born 1951), Spanish mathematician
- David Nucifora (born 1962), Australian rugby league footballer
- David Nuffer (born 1952), American judge
- David Nugent (born 1985), English footballer
- David Nugent (American football) (born 1977), American football player
- David Nunan (born 1949), Australian linguist
- David Nurse (born 1976), English footballer
- David Nutt (born 1951), English neuropsychopharmacologist
- David Nuttall (born 1962), British politician
- David Nutter (born 1960), American television director
- David Nuuhiwa (born 1948), American surfer
- David Nuyoma (born 1963), Namibian stock market Chairman
- David Nwaba (born 1993), American basketball player
- David Nyathi (born 1969), South African footballer
- David Nyika (born 1995), New Zealand boxer
- David Nykl (born 1967), Czech-Canadian actor

=== O ===
- David Oakes (born 1983), English actor
- David S. Oderberg (born 1963), Australian philosopher
- David Ochieng (born 1992), Kenyan footballer
- Davíð Oddsson (born 1948), Icelandic politician
- David O'Doherty (born 1975), Irish comedian
- David Odonkor (born 1984), German footballer
- David Oei (born 1950), Hong Kong-American pianist
- David Oelhoffen (born 1968), French film director
- David W. Ogden (born 1953), American lawyer
- David Oh (born 1960), American attorney
- David O'Halloran (1955–2013), Australian rules footballer
- David O'Halloran (cricketer) (born 2000), Irish cricketer
- David O'Hara (born 1965), Scottish actor
- David O'Hare (born 1990), Irish tennis player
- David Oistrakh (1908–1974), Soviet violinist
- David Okereke (born 1997), Nigerian footballer
- David Ezra Okonşar (born 1961), Turkish-Belgian pianist
- David Oks (born 2001), American political activist
- David Okumu (born 1982), Kenyan cricketer
- David O'Leary (born 1958), Irish football manager
- David O'List (born 1948), English guitarist
- David O'Loughlin (disambiguation)
- David Olney (1948–2020), American singer-songwriter
- David Olusoga (born 1970), British historian
- David Omand (born 1947), British civil servant
- David O'Morchoe (1928–2019), British army officer
- David F. O'Neill (1904–1963), American naval officer
- David Ono, Japanese-American news anchor
- David Onyemata (born 1992), Nigerian-Canadian football player
- David Opas (1936–1980), Australian judge
- David Opatoshu (1918–1996), American actor
- David Opoku (born 1992), Ghanaian footballer
- David Oppenheimer (1834–1897), Canadian entrepreneur
- David Orbansky (1843–1897), American Union Army soldier
- David Orbeliani (1739–1796), Georgian politician and poet
- David Oreck (1923–2023), American entrepreneur
- David Orentlicher, American educator and politician
- David Ormsby-Gore (1918–1985), British diplomat and politician
- Dave Ortega, American comics artist
- David Ortiz (born 1975), Dominican baseball player
- David Oscarson (born 1966), American sculptor
- David Oshinsky (born 1944), American historian
- David Osit (born 1987), American filmmaker
- David Ospina (born 1988), Colombian footballer
- David Ossman (born 1936), American writer
- David Ostrosky (1956–2023), Mexican actor
- David Ostrowski (born 1981), German painter
- David Oteo (born 1973), Mexican footballer
- David Otero (born 1980), Spanish singer
- David Ott (composer) (born 1947), American musical composer
- David N. Ott (1937–2020), American politician and lawyer
- David Ottignon, American Marine Corps major general
- David Otto (born 1999), German footballer
- David Otunga (born 1980), American actor and wrestler
- David Oubel (born 1975), Spanish convicted criminal
- David Ousted (born 1985), Danish footballer
- David Outcalt (1935–2013), American academic administrator
- David Hicks Overmyer (1889–1973), American artist
- David Overstreet (1958–1984), American football player
- David Owens (born 1962), Australian politician
- David Owe (born 1977), Danish actor and stuntman
- David Owino (born 1988), Kenyan footballer
- David Owino (footballer, born 1998) (born 1998), Kenyan footballer
- David Owusu (born 1998), English footballer
- David Oxley (1920–1985), English actor
- David Oxton (born 1945), New Zealand racing driver
- David Oyedepo (born 1954), Nigerian preacher
- David Oyelowo (born 1976), English actor
- David Oyite-Ojok (1940–1983), Ugandan military commander
- David Ozio (born 1954), American bowler
- David Ozmanov (born 1995), Russian footballer
- David Ozonoff, American public health and medicine professor

=== P ===
- David Paas (born 1971), Belgian footballer
- David Pablos (born 1983), Mexican director
- David Pack (born 1952), American musician
- David Packard (1912–1996), American electrical engineer and entrepreneur
- David Woodley Packard (born 1940), American professor
- David Packouz (born 1982), American arms dealer and inventor
- David Padgett (born 1985), American basketball coach
- David Paetkau (born 1972), Canadian actor
- David Paetz (born 1940), New Zealand cricketer
- David Paich (born 1954), American musician
- David Paintin (1930–2019), British doctor
- David Paisley (born 1979), Scottish actor
- David Pakman (born 1984), Argentine-American political commentator
- David Raju Palaparthi (1958–2024), Indian legislator
- David Palecek (1972–2010), American consultant
- David Palffy (born 1969), Canadian actor
- David Palladini (1946–2019), American illustrator
- David Pallister (1945–2021), British journalist
- David Palumbo (born 1982), American illustrator
- David Paniagua (born 1959), Bolivian footballer
- David Panka (born 1999), Dutch footballer
- David W. Panuelo (born 1964), Micronesian politician
- David Papillon (1691–1792), British lawyer and politician
- David Papillon (architect) (1581–1659), French architect
- David Papineau, British philosopher
- David Paradelo (born 1985), Canadian water polo coach
- David Parmley (born 1959), American vocalist
- David Parry-Evans (1935–2020), British air force commander
- David Parry-Jones (1933–2017), Welsh sports commentator
- David Pasquesi (born 1960), American actor
- David Passig (born 1957), Israeli futurist
- David Pastorius, American bass guitarist
- David Pastrňák (born 1996), Czech ice hockey player
- David Pate (born 1962), American tennis player
- David Patiño (born 1967), Mexican footballer
- David Paton (born 1949), Scottish bassist
- David Pauley (born 1983), American baseball player
- David Paulides, American police officer and investigator
- David Paulino (born 1994), Dominican baseball player
- David Pawson (1930–2020), British evangelical minister
- David Paymer (born 1954), American actor
- David Peace (born 1967), English writer
- David Pears (1921–2009), British philosopher
- David Peaston (1957–2012), American singer
- David Pecker (born 1951), American publisher
- David Peckinpah (1951–2006), American television writer
- David Pelletier (born 1974), Canadian figure skater
- David Pellow (born 1969), American professor
- David Pender (born 1987), American football player
- David Penner (1958–2020), Canadian architect
- David Pentreath (1933–2019), English naval officer
- David Penzer, American realtor
- David Peralta (born 1987), Venezuelan baseball player
- David Perdiguero (born 1984), Spanish football manager
- David Perdue (born 1949), American businessman and politician
- David Perlman (1918–2020), American journalist
- David Perlmutter (born 1954), American doctor and author
- David Perno (born 1967), American baseball coach
- David Perpetuini (born 1979), English footballer
- David Perron (born 1988), Canadian ice hockey player
- David Petel (1921–2019), Israeli politician
- Dave Peterson (ice hockey) (1931–1997), American ice hockey coach
- David Petraeus (born 1952), American military officer and CIA director
- David Petrović (born 2003), Serbian footballer
- David Pettifor (1945–2017), British metallurgist
- David Pevsner (born 1958), American actor
- David Peyman, American attorney
- David Piccini (born 1988), Canadian politician
- David Pfaff (born 1966), South African businessman and former cricketer
- David Pfeffer (born 1982), German singer
- David Pfeil (born 1967), American former soccer midfielder
- David Pham (born 1967), Vietnamese-American poker player
- David Philip (1880–1917), Scottish footballer
- David Butt Philip (born 1980), British tenor
- David Philipps (born 1977), American journalist and author
- David Philipson (1862–1949), American rabbi
- David Phiri (1937–2012), Zambian businessman
- David Phoenix (born 1966), English biochemist
- David Pichler (diver) (born 1968), American diver
- David V. Picker (1931–2019), American film executive
- David Pietrusza (born 1949), American author and historian
- David Pike (born 1962), English cricketer
- David Maryanayagam Swamidoss Pillat (1905–1969), Indian clergyman
- David Pines (1924–2018), American professor
- David Pingree (1933–2005), American historian
- David Pion-Berlin, American political scientist
- David Pipe (born 1983), Welsh footballer
- David Pipe (racehorse trainer), English racehorse trainer
- David Pirie (born 1953), English screenwriter
- David W. Piston, American physicist
- David Pithey (1936–2018), Zimbabwean cricketer
- David R. Pitts, American healthcare executive
- David Pittu (born 1967), American actor
- David Pizarro (born 1979), Chilean footballer
- David Plaisted, American computer science professor
- David Plante (born 1940), American novelist
- David Plastow (1932–2019), British businessman
- David Pleat (born 1945), English football manager
- David Pledger (born 1962), Australian artist
- David M. Pletcher (1920–2004), American historian
- David Plotz (born 1970), American journalist
- David Plouffe (born 1967), American political strategist
- David Plowden (born 1932), American photographer
- David Pogue (born 1963), American writer
- David Poile (born 1950), Canadian ice hockey executive
- David Pollack (born 1982), American football player
- David Polonsky (born 1973), Ukrainian-Israeli illustrator
- David Poltorak, Australian game show champion
- David Pomeranz (born 1951), American singer
- David Pomeroy (born 1973), Canadian operatic tenor
- David Pool (born 1966), American football player
- David Poore (born 1966), British musician
- David Popovici (born 2004), Romanian swimmer
- David Popper (1843–1913), Bohemian cellist
- David Portnoy (born 1977), American internet celebrity and businessman
- David Powers (1912–1998), American military advisor
- David Poythress (1943–2017), American politician
- David M. Pozar (born 1952), American engineer
- David Prager (born 1977), American tech executive
- David Prall (1886–1940), American philosopher
- David Pramik (born 1990), American music producer
- David Praporgescu (1866–1916), Romanian general
- David Preiss (born 1947), Czech-British mathematician
- David Premack (1925–2015), American professor
- David Prentice (1936–2014), English artist
- David Pressman (born 1977), American diplomat
- David L. Preston, American historian
- David Pretot (born 1969), French skier
- David Pretty (born 1951), Australian rules footballer
- David W. Preus (1922–2021), American minister
- David Prill (born 1959), American author
- David Probert (born 1988), Welsh jockey
- David Prosho (born 1965), English actor
- David Proud (born 1983), English actor
- David Proval (born 1942), American actor
- David T. Provost (born 1972), American businessman
- David Prowse (1935–2020), English actor, bodybuilder and weightlifter
- David Pruiksma (born 1957), American animator
- David Prutton (born 1981), English footballer
- David Pryce-Jones (born 1936), British author
- David Pryke (born 1970), South African cricketer
- David Pryor (1934–2024), American politician
- David William Pua (1836–1896), Hawaiian politician
- David Puckett (born 1960), English footballer
- David Puente, Spanish television producer
- David Pujadas (born 1964), French journalist
- David Cabrera Pujol (born 1989), Mexican footballer
- David Pulkrabek (born 1993), Czech judoka
- David Purley (1945–1985), British racing driver
- David Endicott Putnam (1898–1918), American flying ace
- David Puttnam (born 1941), British film producer
- David Pyatt (born 1973), British musician
- David Pybus (born 1970), British bassist
- David E. I. Pyott (born 1953), British business executive

=== Q ===
- David Qamaniq (born 1961), Canadian stage actor and politician
- David Quammen (born 1948), American writer
- David Quantick (born 1961), English novelist, comedy writer and critic
- David E. Quantock, American senior army officer
- David Quarrey (born 1966), British diplomat
- David Quayle (1936–2010), British businessman
- David Quesada (born 1971), American soccer player
- David Quessenberry (born 1990), American football player
- David Querol (born 1989), Spanish footballer
- David Quibell (1879–1962), British builder and politician
- David Quilter (born 1942), English actor
- David Quirk (born 1981), Australian actor
- David Quiroz (born 1982), Ecuadorian footballer

=== R ===
- David Rabadán (born 2000), Spanish footballer
- David Rabe (born 1940), American playwright
- David Rabinowitch (1943–2023), Canadian visual artist
- David Rackley (born 1981), American baseball umpire
- David Rader (born 1957), American football player and coach
- David Radler (born 1944), Canadian executive
- David Radner (1848–1901), Lithuanian writer and translator
- David Rae (1724–1804), Scottish judge
- David Raeburn (1927 – 2021), British classical translator and director
- David Ragan (born 1985), American stock car racing driver
- David Ragsdale (born 1958), American violinist
- David Raih (born 1980), American football coach
- David Rainey (born 1968), American reality television personality
- David Rakoff (1964–2012), American essayist
- David Rakowski (born 1958), American composer
- David Raksin (1912–2004), American composer
- David Rall (1926–1999), American cancer specialist
- David Ralston (1954–2022), American attorney and politician
- David Ramadan (born 1970), Lebanese-American politician and businessman
- David A Ramey (1939–2017), American artist
- David G. Rand, American professor
- David Randall (1951–2021), British journalist
- David A. Randall (1905–1975), American book dealer
- David Randitsheni (??–2009), South African rapist
- David Ranz, American diplomat
- David Rapaport (1911–1960), Hungarian clinical psychologist
- David Rasche (born 1944), American actor
- David Rasnick (born 1948), American biochemist
- David Ratcliffe (born 1957), English-Australian footballer
- David Ratcliffe (cricketer), British cricketer
- David Ratford (born 1934), British translator and diplomat
- David Rath (born 1965), Czech medical doctor and politician
- David Grey Rattray (1958–2007), South African historian
- David Rattray (1970-), Scottish sport shooter
- David H. Raulet, American immunologist
- David Raum (born 1998), German footballer
- David A. Rausch (1947–2023), American author
- David Rawlings (born 1969), American guitarist
- David Rawson (1941–2020), American diplomat
- David Raya (born 1995), Spanish footballer
- David Raziel (1910–1941), Belarusian Zionist
- David Ready, American film producer
- David Reale (born 1984), Canadian actor
- David Rebibo, American rabbi
- David Recordon (born 1986), American technologist
- David Reddaway (born 1953), British diplomat
- David Redden (1949–2024), American auctioneer
- David Redfern (1936–2014), English photographer
- David Redick (1753–1805), Irish-American lawyer
- David Regis (born 1968), Martinican footballer
- David Registe (born 1988), American-Dominican long-jumper
- David Fukamachi Regnfors (born 1984), Swedish actor
- David Rehling (1949–2021), Danish lawyer
- David Reilly (1971–2005), American singer-songwriter
- David Reimer (1965–2004), Canadian botched surgery victim
- David Reis (born 1964), American politician
- David Reivers (born 1958), American actor
- David Oliver Relin (1962–2012), American journalist
- David Relman, American microbiologist
- David H. Remes (born 1954), American lawyer
- David Remez (1886–1951), Israeli politician
- David Remnick (born 1958), American journalist
- David Renz, American professor
- David Resnik (born 1962), American bioethicist
- David Reutimann (born 1970), American stock car racing driver
- David Reyes (born 1985), Chilean footballer
- David Reynolds (born 1985), Australian racing drivers
- David Reynoso (1926–1994), Mexican actor
- David Rheem (born 1980), American poker player
- David Rhoads (1932–2017), American cyclist
- David Rhys-Jones (born 1962), Australian rules footballer
- David Riazanov (1870–1938), Russian archivist
- David Ricardo (1772–1823), British political economist
- David Richman (born 1978), American basketball coach
- David Rickels (born 1989), American mixed martial artist
- David Ricketts (cyclist) (1920–1996), British cyclist
- David Ricketts (musician) (born 1953), American musician
- David Ridgen, Canadian filmmaker
- David Ridley (born 1954), English cricketer
- David Rieff (born 1952), American writer and policy analyst
- David Riesman (1909–2002), American sociologist
- David Rigert (born 1947), Soviet weightlifter
- David Riker (born 1963), American screenwriter
- David Rikl (born 1971), Czech tennis player
- David Rimmer (1942–2023), Canadian film director
- David Rimoin (1936–2012), Canadian-American geneticist
- David Ring (born 1953), American motivational speaker
- David Rintoul (born 1948), Scottish actor
- David Riolo (born 1972), Italian rugby league footballer
- David Riordan, American media designer
- David Bárcena Ríos (1941–2017), Mexican equestrian
- David Ripley (born 1966), English cricket coach
- David Risher (born 1965), American businessman
- David Riske (born 1976), American baseball player
- David Ritchie, physicist
- David Rittenhouse (1732–1796), American astronomer
- David Rittich (born 1992), Czech ice hockey player
- David Ritz (born 1943), American author
- David Rivard (born 1953), American poet
- David Rivera (born 1965), American politician
- David Rivers (born 1965), American basketball player
- David Rivers (American football) (born 1994), American football player
- David B. Rivkin (1956–2024), American attorney and political commentator
- David Rizzio (1533–1566), Italian courtier
- David Roback (1958–2020), American guitarist
- David Robb (born 1947), Scottish actor
- David Rocastle (1967–2001), English footballer
- David Rocco (born 1970), Canadian executive producer
- David Roche (1573–1635), Irish politician and magnate
- David Rockefeller (1915–2017), American banker
- David Rocker (born 1943), American hedge fund manager
- David Rockwell (born 1956), American architect
- David Rodan (born 1983), Fijian-Australian rules footballer
- David Roddy (born 2001), American basketball player
- David Roddy (law enforcement), American police chief
- David Rodela (born 1986), American boxer
- David Roderick (born 1970), American poet
- David Rodigan (born 1951), British disc jockey
- David Roditi (born 1973), Mexican tennis player and coach
- David Rodman (born 1983), Slovenian ice hockey player
- David Rodrigues (born 1991), Portuguese cyclist
- David Roe (born 1965), English snooker player
- David Roediger (born 1952), American professor
- David Rohde (born 1967), American investigative journalist
- David Rohl (born 1950), British Egyptologist
- David Roitman (1884–1943), Russian-American composer
- David Rokeach, American drummer
- David Rokeby (born 1960), Canadian artist
- David Roland (born 1930), American film producer
- David Rolfe (1964–2015), Australian Paralympic swimmer
- David Rollins (baseball) (born 1989), American baseball player
- David Romer (born 1958), American economist
- David Romtvedt (born 1950), American poet
- David Ron, Israeli cellular biochemist
- David Ropeik (born 1951), American consultant
- David Rorvik (born 1944), American journalist
- David Rosa (born 1986), Portuguese mountain biker
- David Rosebrook (1874–1937), American musician
- David H. Rosmarin, American professor
- David Rosowsky (born 1963), American engineer
- David Rothbard (born 1964), American activist
- David Rotenberg (1930–2022), Canadian politician
- David Rotenberg (author) (1950–2023), Canadian author
- David Rothkopf (born 1955), American professor and journalist
- David Rothman (medical historian) (1937–2020), American professor
- David Rothman (statistician) (1935–2004), American statistician
- David Rotundo (born 1991), Canadian blues player
- David Roumieu (born 1981), French rugby union footballer
- David Rounds (1930–1983), American actor
- David Roundy, American physicist
- David Rousseau (born 1960), British philosopher
- David Rousset (1912–1997), French writer and political activist
- David Rouzer (born 1972), American politician
- David Rovics (born 1967), American singer-songwriter
- David Rowe-Ham (1935–2020), British accountant
- David Rowley (born 1990), Australian-Malaysian footballer
- David Rubadiri (1930–2018), Malawian diplomat
- David Rubenstein (born 1949), American lawyer, businessman, and philanthropist
- David Rubinger (1924–2017), Israeli photographer
- David Rubio (1934–2000), English instrument maker
- David Rubio (coach) (born 1959), American volleyball coach
- David Rubitsky (1917–2013), American veteran of World War II
- David Rudder (born 1953), Trinidadian calypsonian
- David Sturtevant Ruder (1929–2020), American law professor
- David Rudisha (born 1988), Kenyan middle-distance runner
- David Rudman (born 1963), American puppeteer
- David Rueda, American professor
- David Ruelle (born 1935), Belgian mathematical physicist
- David Ruffin (1941–1991), American singer
- David Ruggerio (born 1962), American chef
- David Ruggles (1810–1849), American abolitionist and printer
- David Ruíz (1912–1994), Chilean footballer
- David Runciman, 4th Viscount Runciman of Doxford (born 1967), English political scientist
- David Rundblad (born 1990), Swedish ice hockey player
- David Rundqvist (born 1993), Swedish ice hockey player
- David Rupert (born 1951), American intelligence agent
- David Ruprecht (born 1948), American actor
- David Rutherford-Jones (born 1958), British army officer
- David Rutigliano (born 1965), American politician
- David Ryall (1935–2014), English actor
- David Ryu (born 1975), Korean-American politician

=== S ===
- David Saad (born 1954), Lebanese judoka
- David M. Sabatini (born 1968), American scientist and professor
- David Sackett (1934–2015), American-Canadian medical doctor
- David Sacks (writer), American television writer
- David O. Sacks (born 1972), American entrepreneur
- David Saelens (born 1975), Belgian race car driver
- David Safavian (born 1967), American lawyer and lobbyist
- David Sage, American television actor
- David Sagiv (1928–2019), Israeli linguist
- David Sahadi (born 1961), American multimedia producer
- David Šain (born 1988), Croatian rower
- David Saint (born 1963), American theatre director
- David Saint-Jacques (born 1970), Canadian astronaut
- David Saker (born 1966), Australian cricket coach
- David Sakurai (born 1979), Japanese-Danish actor
- David Sakvarelidze (born 1981), Ukrainian-Georgian politician
- David Salle (born 1952), American painter
- David Salo (born 1969), American linguist
- David Salomons (1797–1873), British activist and baronet
- David Salsburg (born 1931), American author
- David Saltzberg (born 1967), American professor
- David Salzman (born 1943), American television producer
- David Sam (born 1933), American judge
- David B. Samadi (born 1963), Iranian-American urologist
- David Sammartino (born 1960), American wrestler and trainer
- David Sammel (born 1961), South African tennis coach
- David Samwell (1751–1798), Welsh naval surgeon and poet
- David Sanborn (1945–2024), American jazz alto saxophonist
- David Sancious (born 1953), American musician
- David B. Sandalow (born 1957), American policy expert
- David F. Sandberg (born 1981), Swedish filmmaker
- David Sandiford (born 1970), English cricketer
- David Sandlin (artist) (born 1956), Northern Irish artist
- David Sandlin (baseball) (born 2001), American baseball player
- David Sandström (born 1975), Swedish drummer
- David Sanjek (1952–2011), American professor
- David Sankey (1809–1884), American politician and tax collector
- David Santee (born 1957), American figure skater
- David Santiago (born 1970), American politician
- David Santisteban (born 2001), Spanish footballer
- David Jhefer Domingues dos Santos (born 1999), Brazilian footballer
- David Sarnoff (1891–1971), Russian-American businessman
- David Sarser (1921–2013), American musician
- David Sassoli (1956–2022), Italian politician
- David Sasson, Israeli diplomat
- David Satcher (born 1941), American medical doctor
- David Sater (born 1947), American politician
- David Satter (born 1947), American journalist
- David M. Satterfield (born 1954), American diplomat
- David Saul (1939–2017), Bermudian politician
- David Savard (born 1990), Canadian ice hockey player
- David Sawer (born 1961), British composer
- David Sawyer, American politician
- David Sawyier (1951–2019), American rower
- David Sax (born 1979), Canadian journalist
- David Saxe (born 1969), American theatre producer
- David Saxe (judge) (born 1942), American judge
- David S. Saxon (1920–2005), American physicist
- David Scaife, Australian politician
- David Scarboro (1968–1988), English actor
- David Scarpa, American screenwriter
- David Scase (1919–2003), British theatre director
- David Scearce (born 1965), Canadian lawyer and screenwriter
- David Schaal (born 1963), American-English actor
- David Schaberg (born 1964), American academic
- David Schley Schaff (1852–1941), American Presbyterian clergyman
- David Schang, Scottish carpenter
- David Schapira (born 1980), American politician
- David S. Scharfstein (born 1960), American professor
- David Scheffer (born 1953), American lawyer and diplomat
- David Schenker (born 1968), American diplomat
- David J. Schiappa (born 1962), American political staff member
- David Schickele (1937–1999), American musician
- David Schickler (born 1969), American screenwriter
- David Schiff (born 1945), American composer
- David Schimel (born 1955), American rocket engineer
- David Schindler (1940–2021), Canadian-American limnologist
- David Schippers (1929–2018), American lawyer
- David Schirmer (1623–1686), German poet
- David Schizer (born 1968), American lawyer and academic
- David Schlemko (born 1987), Canadian ice hockey player
- David A. Schlissel, American energy consultant
- David Schlosberg (born 1963), American political theorist
- David Schmader (born 1968), American writer
- David Schmeidler (1939–2022), Israeli mathematician
- David Schmidtz, Canadian-American philosopher
- David P. Schmitt, American psychologist
- David Schmoeller (born 1947), American film director
- David Schnarch (1946–2020), American psychologist
- David Schnaufer (1952–2006), American musician
- David Schnell (born 1971), German painter
- David Schnitter (born 1948), American saxophonist
- David Schnoor (born 1961), American politician
- David Schoen (born 1958), American attorney
- David Schoenbrod, American professor
- David Schoenbrun (1915–1988), American broadcast journalist
- David Schomer (born 1956), British businessman and inventor
- David J. Schow (born 1955), American author
- David Schrader (born 1952), American harpsichordist
- David Schubert (1913–1946), American poet
- David Schuman (1944–2019), American judge
- David Schuman (football analyst), American football executive and analyst
- David Schurmann (born 1974), Brazilian director
- David Schutter (1940–2005), Hawaii lawyer
- David Schütter (born 1991), German actor
- David M. Schwarz (born 1951), American architect
- David Schwebel, American psychologist
- David Schweickart (born 1942), American mathematician
- David Schweikert (born 1962), American politician and businessman
- David Schweiner (born 1994), Czech volleyball player
- David Schwimmer (born 1966), American actor and director
- David Schwimmer (banker) (born 1968/1969), American banker
- David M. Scienceman, Australian scientist
- David Scondras (1946–2020), American politician
- David A. Score, American marine admiral
- David Scowsill, British businessman
- David Scrymgeour (born 1957), Canadian professor
- David Seals (1947–2017), American writer
- David Seaman (born 1963), English footballer
- David Seamands (1922–2006), American author and Methodist leader
- David Searle (1936–2021), Canadian politician
- David Sedaris (born 1956), American essayist
- David Seddon, British academic
- David Segui (born 1966), Cuban-American baseball player
- David Sehat, American academic
- David Seisay (born 1967), Swedish-American songwriter
- David Sejusa (born 1954), Ugandan lawyer
- David Selberg (1995–2018), Swedish ice hockey player
- David Selby (born 1941), American actor
- David Self (born 1970), American screenwriter
- David Sellar (1941–2019), Scottish heraldry regulator
- David E. Sellers (1938–2025), American architect
- David Seltzer (born 1940), American screenwriter
- David O. Selznick (1902–1965), American film producer
- David Semel, American director and producer
- David Semerad (born 1991), Filipino-Czech basketball player
- David Moinina Sengeh, Sierra Leonean politician
- David B. Sentelle (born 1943), American judge
- David Sepkoski (born 1972), American professor and historian
- David Sereda (born 1957), Canadian musician
- David Serero (architect) (born 1974), French architect
- David Serero (singer) (born 1981), Moroccan-French opera singer
- David Servan-Schreiber (1961–2011), French medical doctor
- David Sesay (born 1998), English footballer
- David Sessions, American politician
- David Sevilla (born 1940), Mexican field hockey player
- David Sewall (1735–1825), American judge
- David Sewart, British professor
- David Sewell (born 1977), New Zealand cricketer
- David Shacklady (born 1967), English golfer
- David Shackleton (1863–1938), British cotton worker, civil servant
- David Shae (born 1981), American actor
- David Shaffer (1936–2023), American professor
- David Shahar (1926–1997), Israeli writer
- David Shakarian (1914–1984), American businessman
- David Shakow (1901–1981), American psychologist
- David Shale (1932–2016), New Zealand-American mathematician
- David Shalleck (born 1961), American chef
- David Shambaugh (born 1953), American professor
- David F. Shamoon, Canadian screenwriter
- David Shankle (born 1967), American guitarist
- David Shannon (born 1959), American writer and illustrator
- David Shapell (1921–2015), Polish-American real estate developer
- David Shapiro (disambiguation), multiple people
- David Sharbani (1920–1985), Israeli-Colombian rabbi
- David Sharp (mountaineer) (1972–2006), English mountaineer
- David Shatraw (born 1962), American actor
- David Shaughnessy (born 1957), British actor and producer
- David Shaw-Smith (1939–2021), Irish filmmaker
- David Shayler (born 1965), British whistleblower
- David Shearer (born 1957), New Zealand politician
- David Shedd, American intelligence officer
- David Shedden (1944–2017), Scottish rugby union footballer
- David Sheehan (1938–2020), American broadcaster
- David Sheff (born 1955), American author
- David Sheffield (born 1948), American comedy writer
- David Sheiner (born 1928), American actor
- David Sheinkopf, American actor
- David Sheldrick (1919–1977), Kenyan farmer
- David Shelley (1957–2015), American musician
- David Shenk (born 1966), American writer
- David Shentow (1925–2017), Belgian-Canadian Holocaust survivor
- David Sheppard (1929–2005), British bishop
- David Sherer (born 1957), American medical doctor
- David Benjamin Sherry (born 1981), American photographer
- David Sherwin (1942–2018), British screenwriter
- David Shetzline (born 1934), American author
- David Shields (born 1956), American writer and filmmaker
- David Shifrin (born 1950), American clarinetist
- David Shilling (born 1949), English sculptor
- David Shillinglaw (born 1982), British artist
- David Shillington (born 1983), Australian rugby union footballer
- David Shimer, American historian and foreign policy analyst
- David Shinar, Israeli researcher
- David Shing (born 1970), Australian marketing executive
- David H. Shinn (born 1940), American diplomat
- David K. Shipler (born 1942), American author
- David Shipley (born 1963), American journalist
- David Shire (born 1937), American songwriter
- David Shmoys (born 1959), American professor
- David Shoebridge, Australian politician
- David Shofet, Iranian-American rabbi
- David Sholtz (1891–1953), American politician
- David Shor, American data scientist
- David Shore (born 1959), Canadian writer and television producer
- David M. Shoup (1904–1983), American military general
- David Showell (1924–1955), American fighter pilot
- David Shreeve, English religious figure
- David Shreeve (priest) (1934–2021), English priest
- David M. Shribman, American journalist
- David Shrier, American futurist
- David Shrigley (born 1968), British visual artist
- David Shterenberg (1881–1948), Ukrainian-Russian painter
- David Shukman (born 1958), British journalist
- David Shulkin (born 1959), American medical doctor and government official
- David Dean Shulman (born 1949), Israeli Indologist
- David Shuster (born 1967), American television journalist
- David Shute, British journalist
- David Shute (ice hockey) (born 1971), American ice hockey player
- David Shutt (1942–2020), British politician
- David Sibeko (1938–1979), South African journalist
- David Sidikman (born 1934), American lawyer and politician
- David Sidoo (born 1959), Canadian businessman
- David Albin Zywiec Sidor (1947–2020), American-Nicaraguan bishop
- David Sidorsky (1927–2021), American professor
- David Sidwick, British politician
- David Sieck (born 1957), American politician
- David Sieff (1939–2019), British businessman
- David Silinde (born 1984), Tanzanian politician
- David Sills (1938–2011), American jurist
- David Sills (American football) (born 1996), American football player
- David Silveria (born 1972), American drummer
- David Silvers (born 1979), American politician
- David Silverstein (1896–1944), American journalist
- David Simão (born 1990), Portuguese footballer
- David Simas (born 1970), American political figure
- David Simbi, Zimbabwean engineer
- David Simbo (born 1989), Sierra Leonean footballer
- David Simchi-Levi (born 1955), American academic
- David Thabo Simelane (born 1956), Swazi serial killer
- David Eseli Simiyu (born 1958), Kenyan politician
- David Simmonds, British politician
- David J. Simms (1933–2018), Indian-Irish mathematician
- David Singleton (born 1961), English record producer
- David Alfaro Siqueiros (1896–1974), Mexican social realist painter
- David Sirlin, American game designer
- David Sirota (born 1975), American journalist
- David J. Skal (1952–2024), American historian and critic
- David Skeel (born 1961), American professor
- David Skegg (born 1947), New Zealand epidemiologist
- David Sklansky (born 1947), American poker player
- David Sklenička (born 1996), Czech ice hockey player
- David J. Skorton (born 1949), American medical doctor
- David Skover (born 1951), American professor
- David Slack (born 1972), American television writer
- David Slade (born 1969), British director
- David R. Slavitt (born 1935), American writer
- David Sleath, English businessman
- David Sleet, American scientist
- David Sloman (born 1961), English health service executive
- David Small (born 1945), American writer
- David Smeeton (1936–2020), English journalist
- David Smerdon (born 1984), Australian chess grandmaster
- David Smith (murderer) (born 1956), English murderer, rapist, and suspected serial killer
- David Smith, multiple people
- David Louis Sneddon (born 1980; disappeared 2004), American university student
- David Sneddon (born 1978), Scottish singer
- David Snowdon (born 1952), American epidemiologist
- David Snyder (born 1944), American production designer
- David So (born 1987), Korean-American comedian and YouTuber
- David Motta Soares (born 1997), Brazilian ballet dancer
- David Sobel (born 1949), American academic
- David Sobey (1931–2023), Canadian businessman
- David Sobolov (born 1964), Canadian voice actor
- David L. Sokol (born 1956), American business executive
- David Solans (born 1996), Spanish film and television actor
- David Somerset (1928–2017), English peer and landowner
- David Somerset (banker) (1930–2014), English banker
- David Sonenberg, American music manager
- David Sonin (1935–2008), English music critic and arts journalist
- David A. Sonnenfeld (born 1953), American sociologist
- David Sopher (1929–2019), Indian water polo player
- David Soria (born 1993), Spanish footballer
- David Sosa, American philosopher
- David Sosebee (born 1955), American NASCAR driver
- David Soskice (born 1942), British economist
- David Sosnowski (born 1959), American novelist
- David Soto (born 1993), Spanish footballer
- David Soul (1943–2024), British-American actor and singer
- David Sousa (born 1980), Spanish footballer
- David Souter (1939–2025), American Justice of the Supreme Court
- David Soyer (1923–2010), American cellist
- David Spade (born 1964), American actor and television host
- David Spears (born 1963), Canadian cyclist
- David Speers (born 1974), Australian journalist
- David Spedding (1943–2001), British intelligence officer
- David Speedie (born 1960), Scottish footballer
- David Speirs (born 1984), Australian politician
- David Spergel (born 1961), American theoretical astrophysicist
- David Spero (born 1951), American music manager
- David Spiegel (born 1945), American cancer researcher
- David Spiegelhalter (born 1953), British statistician
- David Spielberg (1939–2016), American actor
- David Špiler (born 1983), Slovenian handball player
- David Spiller (1942–2018), British artist
- David Spiller (politician), American politician
- David Spindler, American scholar
- David Spinozza (born 1949), American guitarist
- David Spinx (born 1951), English actor
- David Spivak (born 1978), American mathematician
- David Spofforth (born 1961), English footballer
- David Spriggs (born 1981), Australian rules footballer
- David Spring (1872–1947), Australian politician
- David Sproxton (born 1954), English animator
- David Squires (composer) (born 1957), Canadian composer
- David Squires (cartoonist) (born 1974), English cartoonist
- David Stack (1957–1976), American murder victim
- David Derek Stacton (1923–1968), American novelist
- David H. Staelin (1938–2011), American astronomer
- David Stagg (born 1983), Australian rugby league footballer
- David Stahel (born 1975), New Zealand historian
- David Staller (born 1955), American theatre director
- David Staples (born 1953), Barbadian sailor
- David Starkey (born 1945), English historian
- David L. Starling, American businessman
- David Starzyk (born 1961), American actor
- David Stav (born 1960), Israeli rabbi
- David Stearns (born 1985), American baseball executive
- David Steel, (born 1938), English politician
- David A. Steen, American conservation biologist
- Davíð Stefánsson (1895–1964), Icelandic poet
- David Steffen (born 1971), American politician and businessman
- David Ezra Stein, American author and illustrator of children's books
- David Steindl-Rast (born 1926), American monk
- David Steinhart, American singer-songwriter
- David B. Steinman (1886–1960), American civil engineer
- David Stenn, American television writer
- David Stensrud (born 1961), American meteorologist
- David Stenstrom (born 1953), American actor
- David Sterling (born 1958), Northern Irish civil servant
- David Stern (1942–2020), American basketball executive
- David Stephan, Canadian social figure
- David Stephen (1951–2020), South African cricketer
- David Steward (born 1951), American businessman
- David Ogden Stiers (1942–2018), American actor and conductor
- David Stiff (born 1984), English cricketer
- David Stiff (basketball) (born 1972), Australian basketball player
- David St. James (born 1947), American actor
- David St. John (born 1949), American poet
- David Stockdale (born 1985), English footballer
- David Stockman (born 1946), American politician and businessman
- David Stockton (born 1991), American basketball player
- David Stoddart (1926–2020), British politician
- David Stoll (born 1952), American anthropologist
- David Stollery (born 1941), American actor
- David Storey (1933–2017), English playwright
- David Storl (born 1990), German shot-putter
- David Stouck (born 1940), Canadian literary critic and biographer
- David Stoupakis (born 1974), American artist
- David Stout (1942–2020), American journalist
- David Stove (1927–1994), Australian philosopher
- David Straiton, American television director
- David Strand (born 1949), American professor
- David Strangeways (1912–1998), British Colonel
- David Strangway (1934–2016), Canadian geophysicist
- David Stras (born 1974), American judge
- David Strassman (born 1957), American ventriloquist
- David Strathairn (born 1949), American actor
- David Stratton (born 1939), English-Australian film critic
- David Strauss (1808–1874), German theologian
- David Street (1917–1971), American actor
- David Strelec (born 2001), Slovak footballer
- David Stremme (born 1977), American stock car racing driver
- David Strettell, American bookstore owner
- David Strettle (born 1983), English rugby union footballer
- David Strickland (1969–1999), American actor
- David Stride (1958–2016), English footballer
- David Střihavka (born 1983), Czech footballer
- David Stringer, American attorney and politician
- David Stromeyer (born 1946), American sculptor
- David Stronach (1931–2020), British archaeologist
- David Strooper (born 1968), Australian rules footballer
- David Stubbs (born 1962), British music journalist
- David Stupich (1921–2006), Canadian legislator
- David Stuurman (1773–1830), South African Khoi chief
- David Stypka (1979–2021), Czech singer-songwriter
- David Suazo (born 1979), Honduran footballer
- David Suchet (born 1946), English actor
- David Sugarbaker (1953–2018), American medical doctor
- David Suhor (born 1968), American musician
- David Sumner, American mathematician
- David Susskind (1920–1987), American producer
- David Sutcliffe (born 1969), Canadian-American actor
- David Suzuki (born 1936), Japanese-Canadian environmental scientist
- David Švagrovský (born 1984), Czech hockey player
- David Švehlík (born 1972), Czech actor
- David Svensson (born 1984), Swedish footballer
- David Sviben (born 1989), Slovenian footballer
- David Svoboda (born 1985), Czech pentathlon athlete
- David Lowry Swain (1801–1868), American politician
- David Swann (born 1949), Canadian doctor and politician
- David Swanson (born 1969), American activist and author
- David F. Swensen (1954–2021), American investor and philanthropist
- David Swerdlick, American journalist
- David Swinney (1946–2006), American psycholinguist
- David Swinton, American economist
- David R. Syiemlieh (born 1953), Indian academic
- David Sylvester (1924–2001), British art critic
- David Sylvian (born 1958), English singer-songwriter
- David Symonds (born 1943), English disc jockey
- David Syrett (1939–2004), American historian
- Dávid Szabó, Hungarian volleyball player
- David Szalay (born 1974), Hungarian-English writer
- David Sze (born 1966), American entrepreneur
- Dávid Szintai (born 1997), Hungarian tennis player
- David Sztybel (born 1967), Canadian philosopher
- David Szurman (born 1981), Czech ice dancer

=== T ===
- David Tabak (1927–2012), Israeli runner
- David Tabizel (born 1965), British entrepreneur
- David Tabor, multiple people
- David Tacey, Australian writer and intellectual
- David M. Tait (born 1947), Scottish airline executive
- David E. Talbert (born 1966), American playwright
- David Talbot (born 1951), American entrepreneur
- David Talbot Rice (1903–1972), English art historian
- David Talerico (born 1956), American politician
- David Talley (born 1950), American prelate
- David Tallichet (1922–2007), American businessman
- David Tanabe (born 1980), American ice hockey player
- David W. Tandy (born 1972), American politician
- David Tanenbaum (born 1956), American guitarist
- David W. Tank, American molecular biologist
- David Tang (1954–2017), Hong Kong businessman
- David Tao, (born 1969), Taiwanese singer-songwriter
- David Tarnas, American politician
- David S. Tatel (born 1942), American jurist
- David Taubman, Australian electrical engineer
- David Tavares (born 1999), Portuguese footballer
- David Taylor, multiple people
- David Tecchler (1666–1748), German luthier
- David Teece (born 1948), New Zealand theorist
- David Teegarden, American musician
- David Tejada (1929–2018), Peruvian medical doctor
- David Temple, British conductor
- David Temple (trade unionist) (1862–1921), Australian trade unionist
- David Templeman (born 1965), Australian politician
- David Tennant (born 1971), Scottish actor
- David Teoh (born 1955), Australian businessman
- David Tepper (born 1957), American businessman and sports owner
- David Terans (born 1994), Uruguayan footballer
- David Terrien (born 1976), French racing driver
- David Terrier (born 1973), French footballer
- David Terteryan (born 1997), Armenian footballer
- David Testo (born 1981), American soccer player
- David Texeira (born 1991), Uruguayan footballer
- David Teymur (born 1989), Swedish mixed martial artist
- David Thai (born 1956), Vietnamese-American gang leader
- David Cruz Thayne (born 1971), American businessman
- David Thesmar, French economist
- David Thewlis (born 1963), English actor, writer and director
- David Thibault (born 1997), French-Canadian singer
- David Thodey (born 1954), Australian businessman
- David J. Tholen (born 1955), American astronomer
- David Thorns (1943–2020), New Zealand sociologist
- David Thorstad (1941–2021), American political activist
- David J. Thouless (1934–2019), British physicist
- David Threlfall (born 1953), English actor
- David Thrussell (born 1961), Australian musician
- David Thulin (born 1983), Swedish music producer
- David Thwaites (born 1976), British actor
- David Tibet (born 1960), British poet
- David Tickle (born 1959), British record producer
- David Tijanić (born 1997), Slovenian footballer
- David Timor (born 1989), Spanish footballer
- David Tindle (born 1932), British painter
- David Tineo (born 1955), American artist
- David Tipper (born 1976), British composer
- David A. Tirrell (born 1953), American chemist
- David Tisch (born 1981), American businessman
- David Tischman, American comic book writer
- David Titcher, American screenwriter
- David Tkachuk (born 1945), Canadian teacher and politician
- David Tkebuchava (born 1991), Russian footballer
- David Tkeshelashvili (born 1969), Georgian politician
- David Tlale (born 1975), South African fashion designer
- David Tod (1805–1868), American politician and industrialist
- David Toews (born 1990), Canadian ice hockey player
- David Toguri (1933–1997), Japanese-Canadian choreographer
- David Toland, American politician
- David Tolbert (born 1956), American prosecutor
- David Toledo (born 1982), Mexican footballer
- David F. Tolin (born 1968), American psychologist
- David Tom (born 1978), American actor
- David Tomassini (born 2000), Sammarinese footballer
- David Tomassoni (1952–2022), American politician
- David Tomaszewski (born 1984), French music director
- David Toms (born 1967), American golfer
- David L. Toney (1857–2014), American politician
- David Tonoyan (born 1967), Armenian politician
- David Kimutai Too (1968–2008), Kenyan politician
- David Toop (born 1949), English musician
- David Torrence (1864–1951), Scottish actor
- David Torrence (athlete) (1985–2017), Peruvian-American runner
- David Torres (footballer, born 1986), Spanish footballer
- David Torres (footballer, born 2003), Spanish footballer
- David Torn (born 1953), American guitarist
- David Toska (born 1975), Norwegian bank robber
- Dávid Tóth (born 1986), Hungarian canoeist
- David Toups (born 1971), American prelate
- David S. Touretzky, American research professor
- David Toussaint (born 1964), American writer
- David Town (born 1976), English footballer
- David Trachtenberg, American national security consultant
- David Tracy (born 1939), American theologian
- David G. Trager (1937–2011), American judge
- David Trainer, American television director
- David Traktovenko (born 1956), Russian businessman and sports owner
- David A. Trampier (1954–2014), American artist
- David Travis (born 1948), American politician
- David Traylor (born 1943), English cricketer
- David Treacy (born 1989), Irish hurler
- David Treadwell (born 1965), American football player
- David Treasure (born 1950), English rugby league footballer
- David Treasure (politician) (1943–2018), Australian politician
- David Trefgarne (born 1941), British politician
- David Tremayne (born 1942), British motor racing journalist
- David Tremblay (born 1987), Canadian wrestler
- David Tremlett (born 1945), English-Swiss sculptor
- David Trench (1915–1988), British army officer
- David Tress (born 1955), British artist
- David Treuer (born 1970), American writer
- David Trewhella (born 1962), Australian rugby union footballer
- David Trezeguet (born 1977), French footballer
- David Trim (born 1969), Indian historian
- David Trimble (1944–2022), Northern Irish politician
- David Trinidad (born 1953), American poet
- David Trivunic (born 2001), German footballer
- David Trobisch (born 1958), German scholar
- David Trone (born 1955), American businessman and politician
- David Trottier, American screenwriter
- David Troughton (born 1950), English actor
- David Trout (born 1957), American football player
- David True (born 1942), American painter
- David Trueba (born 1969), Spanish novelist
- David Trujillo (born 1976), American businessman
- David Truman (1913–2003), American academic
- David Trumble (born 1986), British director
- David Trumbull (1819–1889), American missionary
- David Trummer (born 1994), Australian biker
- David Truong (1945–2014), Vietnamese protester
- David Tse, Hong Kong professor
- David Tsebe (born 1966), South African runner
- David Tshama (born 1996), Congolese boxer
- David Tsimakuridze (1925–2006), Georgian wrestler
- David Tso, Hong Kong lawn bowler
- David Tsorayev (born 1983), Georgian footballer
- David Tsubouchi (born 1951), Japanese-Canadian politician
- David Tsugio Tsutada (1906–1971), Japanese cleric
- David Tua (born 1972), New Zealand boxer
- David Tubridy (born 1980), Irish Gaelic footballer
- David Tudor (1926–1996), American pianist
- David Tukhmanov (born 1940), Soviet composer
- David Tukiçi (born 1956), Albanian composer
- David Tůma (born 1991), Czech ice hockey player
- David Tune (born 1954), Australian public servant
- David Turk, American attorney and politician
- David Tustin (born 1935), English bishop
- David Tutera (born 1966), American wedding planner
- David Tutonda (born 1995), Congolese footballer
- David Tuveson (born 1966), American biologist
- David Tweed, Australian businessman
- David Tweh (born 1998), Liberian footballer
- David E. Twiggs (1790–1862), American army officer
- David Twohill (born 1954), Australian musician
- David Twohy (born 1955), American film director
- David Twomey (born 1961), Australian rules footballer
- David Tyack (1930–2016), American professor
- David Tyacke (1915–2010), English army officer
- David Tyavkase (born 1984), Nigerian footballer
- David Tyree (born 1980), American football player
- David Tyshler (1927–2014), Soviet saber fencer
- David Tyson, Canadian musician
- David Tzur (born 1959), Israeli politician and policeman
- David Tzuriel (born 1946), Israeli psychologist

=== U ===
- David King Udall (1851–1938), American politician
- David Uhl (born 1961), American artist
- David Vogel Uihlein Jr., American businessman
- David Ukleba (1919–1999), Georgian geographer
- David Ulch, American rugby league footballer
- David Ulibarri, American politician
- David C. Ulich, American film producer
- David Ullström (born 1989), Swedish ice hockey player
- David Ulm (born 1984), French footballer
- David Umaru (born 1959), Nigerian politician
- David Unaipon (1872–1967), Australian author
- David Underdown (1925–2009), English historian
- David Ungar, American computer scientist
- David Unruh, American football coach
- David Unsworth (born 1973), English footballer
- David Uosikkinen (born 1956), American drummer
- David Upshal, British television producer
- David Upson (born 1962), British canoeist
- David Urban (born 1964), American lobbyist
- David Ure (1749–1798), Scottish geologist
- David Herrera Urias, American lawyer
- David Urie, American corporate executive
- David Urwitz (born 1973), Swedish singer and musician
- David Ury (born 1973), American comedian and actor
- David Usher (born 1966), British singer-songwriter
- David Ushery (born 1967), American news anchor
- David Ussishkin (born 1935), Israeli archaeologist and professor
- David UU (1948–1994), Canadian poet
- David Uwins (1780–1837), English medical doctor and writer
- David Uzochukwu (born 1998), Australian-Nigerian photographer

=== V ===
- David Vadim (born 1972), Ukrainian-American boxer and actor
- David Vaealiki (born 1980), New Zealand rugby league player
- David Valadao (born 1977), American politician and farmer
- David Valderrama (born 1933), Filipino-American politician
- David Valero (born 1988), Spanish mountain biker
- David Vamplew (born 1987), Scottish poker player
- David Van (born 1964), Australian politician
- David Vanacore, American composer
- David Van Alstyne (1897–1985), American politician
- David M. Van Buren, American politician
- David van Dantzig (1900–1959), Dutch mathematician
- David Van Day (born 1956), English singer
- David van de Kop (1937–1994), Dutch painter
- David Van De Pitte (1941–2009), American music arranger
- David Vanderbilt, American professor
- David Van der Gulik (born 1983), Canadian ice hockey player
- David van der Kellen Jr. (1804–1879), Dutch engraver
- David van der Knaap (born 1948), South African cricketer
- David van der Poel (born 1992), Belgian-Dutch cyclist
- David Vanderpool (born 1960), American medical missionary
- David Vandervelde, American songwriter
- David VanDrunen (born 1971), American professor
- David Van Essen (born 1945), American neuroscientist
- David VanHoose (born 1957), American professor
- David Vanian (born 1956), English musician
- David Van Kriedt (1922–1994), American composer
- David VanLanding (1964–2015), American singer
- David Van Leer (1949–2013), American educator
- David Vanole (1963–2007), American soccer player
- David Van Os (1950–2023), American attorney and politician
- David Van Reybrouck (born 1971), Belgian historian
- David Vanterpool (born 1973), American basketball player and coach
- David Van Tieghem (born 1955), American composer
- David E. Van Zandt (born 1953), American attorney and academic administrator
- David van Zanten (born 1982), Irish footballer
- David Varela (canoeist) (born 1993), Portuguese canoeist
- David Vasquez (born 1948), American boxer
- David Vaudreuil (born 1966), American soccer player
- David Vaver (born 1946), Czech-American lawyer
- David Vavruška (born 1972), Czech football coach
- Dávid Vecsernyés (born 1991), Hungarian artistic gymnast
- David Veesler, French biochemist
- David Veikune (born 1985), American football player
- David Vela, American park administrator
- David Velásquez (born 1989), Honduran footballer
- David Velay (born 1963), French racing driver
- David Venable (TV personality) (born 1964), American television personality
- David Vendetta (born 1968), French disc jockey
- David Verburg (born 1991), American track and field athlete
- David Verdaguer (born 1983), Spanish actor
- David Verser (born 1958), American football player
- David Vest (born 1943), American piano player
- David Vestal (1924–2013), American photographer
- David Vetter (1971–1984), American clinical patient
- David Vetter (farmer), American farmer
- David Viaene (born 1965), American football player
- David Vickery (born 1977), British visual effects supervisor
- David Vidal (born 1950), Spanish football manager
- David Vidal (baseball) (born 1989), Puerto Rican baseball player
- Davíð Viðarsson (born 1984), Icelandic footballer
- David Vigliano (born 1959), American literary agent
- David Vigneault, Canadian civil servant
- David Villa (born 1981), Spanish footballer
- David Villalba (born 1982), Paraguayan footballer
- David Villalpando (born 1959), Mexican actor
- David Vine (1935–2009), English television sports presenter
- David Vines (born 1949), Australian economist
- David Viniar (born 1955), American business executive
- David Virelles (born 1983), Cuban pianist
- David Virgin (born 1962), Irish-Australian musician
- David Viscott (1938–1996), American psychiatrist
- David Visentin (born 1965), Canadian actor and realtor
- David Vitek (born 1974), Australian entrepreneur
- David Vitter (born 1961), American lobbyist
- David Julián Levecq Vives (born 1984), Spanish swimmer
- David Viviano (born 1971), American judge
- David Vladeck (born 1951), American government executive
- David Vlahov (born 1952), American epidemiologist
- David Vlok (born 1963), South African actor
- David Voas (born 1955), American social scientist
- David Vobora (born 1986), American football player
- Dávid Vojvoda (born 1990), Hungarian basketball player
- David Volek (born 1966), Czech ice hockey player
- David Von Ancken (1964–2021), American screenwriter
- David von Ballmoos (born 1994), Swiss footballer
- David Von Drehle (born 1961), American author
- David Von Erich (1958–1984), American wrestler
- David von Grafenberg, French novelist
- David von Krafft (1655–1724), German-Swedish painter
- David von Schlegell (1920–1992), American sculptor
- David Vrankovic (born 1993), Australian footballer
- David Vrbata (born 1983), Czech ice hockey player
- David Vržogić (born 1989), German footballer
- David Vseviov (born 1949), Estonian historian
- David Vuillemin (born 1977), French motocross racer
- David Vunagi (1950–2025), Solomon Islands Anglican bishop
- David Výborný (born 1975), Czech ice hockey player
- David Vychodil (born 1980), Czech ice hockey player
- David Vygodsky (1893–1943), Russian literary critic

=== W ===
- David Wachman (born 1971), Irish racehorse trainer
- David Wachs (born 1980), American actor
- David Waddington, Baron Waddington (1929–2017), British politician
- David Waddington (Essex MP) (1810–1863), English politician
- David Wagenfuhr (born 1982), American soccer player
- David Wager (1804–1870), American politician
- David Wagner (tennis), (born 1974), American wheelchair tennis player
- David Wagoner (1926–2021), American poet
- David Wain (born 1969), American actor and comedian
- David Waisman (born 1937), Peruvian politician
- David B. Wake (1936–2021), American professor
- David Wakikona (born 1950), Ugandan aviator and politician
- David Waksberg (born 1956), American activist
- David S. Walbridge (1802–1868), American politician
- David Wald (born 1973), American voice actor
- David J. Wald (born 1962), American seismologist
- David Walentas (born 1939), American real estate developer
- David Wallace-Wells, American journalist
- David Wallechinsky (born 1948), American author, historian and television commentator
- David Walliams (born 1971), English comedian
- David Walters (born 1951), American politician
- David Walters (swimmer) (born 1987), American swimmer
- David Walther (born 2008), Danish racing driver
- David Waltz (1943–2012), American computer scientist
- David Wanigasekera (1860–1955), Sri Lankan Sinhala businessman and politician
- David Wanklyn (1911–1942), British military officer
- David Wansbrough (born 1965), Australian field hockey player
- David Warbeck (1941–1997), New Zealand actor
- David Warburton (1965–2025), British politician
- David Warfield (1866–1951), American stage actor
- David Warner (cricketer) (born 1986), Australian cricket player
- David Warrilow (1934–1995), English actor
- David Warsh (born 1944), American journalist
- David Warshofsky (born 1961), American actor
- David Warsofsky (born 1990), American ice hockey player
- David Washbrook (1948–2021), British historian
- David Washington (born 1990), American baseball player
- David Watford (born 1993), American football player
- David Watkin (historian) (1941–2018), British architectural historian
- David Watmough (1926–2017), Canadian playwright
- David Waxman, American disc jockey
- David Weale, Canadian writer and historian
- David Wear (born 1990), American basketball player
- David Weatherall (1933–2018), British medical doctor
- David Weatherley (actor) (1939–2024), English-New Zealand actor
- David Weathers (born 1969), American baseball player
- David Weaver (born 1987), American basketball player
- David Webber (computer scientist) (born 1955), American information technology expert
- David Webb (Hong Kong activist) (born 1965), activist investor, share market analyst and retired investment banker based in Hong Kong
- David Kenyon Webster (1922–1961?), American soldier, journalist and author
- David Wechsler (1896–1891), Romanian-American psychologist
- David Wecht (born 1962), American attorney and jurist
- David Weddle, American television writer
- David Wehner, American corporate executive
- David Weigel (born 1981), American journalist
- David Weil (disambiguation)
- David Weiner (disambiguation)
- David Weinberg (born 1952), American rower
- David Weinberger (born 1950), American author
- David Weisman (1942–2019), American film producer
- David Weissman, American screenwriter
- David Weissman (documentary filmmaker), American filmmaker
- David Welch (disambiguation)
- David Welker (born 1964), American painter
- David E. Wellbery (born 1947), American professor
- David Weller (born 1957), Jamaican track cyclist
- David Welsh (1793–1845), Scottish Presbyterian minister and academic
- David Welter, American politician
- David Wendell, American professor
- David Wengrow (born 1972), British archaeologist
- David Wenham (born 1965), Australian actor
- David Wenlock (born 1959), English cricketer
- David Wenzel (born 1950), American illustrator
- David Weprin (born 1956), American politician
- David Were, Kenyan politician
- David Wesely (born 1945), American board game designer
- David Wesley (born 1970), American basketball player
- David Wessel (born 1954), American journalist
- David Westin (born 1952), American television personality
- David Wetherall (born 1971), English footballer
- David James Wetherall, American engineer
- David Wetzel, American historian
- David Wevill (born 1935), Japanese-Canadian poet
- David Wharton (born 1969), American swimmer
- David Whatley (born 1966), American corporate executive
- David Wheadon (born 1948), Australian rules footballer
- David John Wheal (1851–1904), Australian businessman
- David Wheater (born 1987), English footballer
- David Wheaton (born 1969), American radio host
- David Whelan (golfer) (born 1961), English golfer
- David A. Whetten (born 1946), American theorist
- David F. Wherley Jr. (1947–2009), American general
- David Whigham (1832–1906), Scottish cricketer
- David Whitehouse (1941–2013), British archaeologist
- David Whitehurst (born 1955), American football player
- David Whitelaw (1875–1970), British writer
- David Whiteley (born 1977), British television presenter
- David A. Whiteley (1944–2017), American horse trainer
- David Whitfield (1925–1980), British vocalist
- David Whitley (born 1984), British author
- David Whitley (politician), American politician
- David W. Whitlock, American academic administrator
- David Whitmer (1805–1888), American author
- David Whitmore (born 1967), American football player
- David Whitney (1939–2005), American art curator
- David Whyte (footballer) (1971–2014), English footballer
- David Whyte (poet) (born 1955), English poet
- David Widdicombe (filmmaker) (1962–2017), Canadian filmmaker
- David Widdicombe (QC) (1924–2019), British political activist
- David Wiegand (1947–2018), American journalist
- David Wiens (born 1964), American cross-country bike racer
- David Wiese (born 1985), South African cricketer
- David Wiesner (born 1956), American illustrator
- David Wiffen (born 1942), English-Canadian singer-songwriter
- David Wiggins (born 1933), English philosopher
- David Wijnkoop (1876–1941), Dutch political leader
- David Wijns (born 1987), Belgian footballer
- David Wikaira-Paul (born 1985), New Zealand actor
- David Wikander (1884–1955), Swedish musicologist
- David Wilczewski (1952–2009), American-Swedish jazz saxophonist
- David Wild (born 1961), American writer and critic
- David Wildstein (born 1961), American businessman and politician
- David Wildt (1950–2020), American biologist
- David Wilhelm (born 1956), American political figure
- David Wilkerson (1931–2011), American evangelist
- David Wilkes (born 1947), British minister
- David Wilks (born 1959), Canadian politician
- David Willardson, American artist
- David Willcocks (1919–2015), British choral conductor
- David Willetts (born 1956), British politician and life peer
- David William (1926–2010), British-Canadian actor
- David Willoughby (1931–1998), English priest
- David Willsie (born 1968), Canadian Paralympic rugby footballer
- David Wilmot (politician) (1814–1868), American politician
- David Wilmot (actor), Irish actor
- David Wilshire (1943–2023), British politician
- David Wilstein (1928–2017), American real estate developer
- David Wiltse (born 1940), American novelist
- David J. Wineland (born 1944), American physicist
- David Winfield (conservator) (1929–2013), British conservator
- David Wingrove (born 1954), British writer
- David Winnie (born 1966), Scottish footballer
- David Winning (born 1961), Canadian-American director
- David Wippman (born 1954), American academic administrator
- David Wiseman (born 1981), American artist
- David Wisniewski (1953–2002), American writer
- David Wittig (born 1955), American corporate executive
- David Witts (born 1991), British actor
- David Wojnarowicz (1954–1992), Polish-American painter
- David Wolfson, Baron Wolfson of Tredegar (born 1968), British politician
- David Wolfson, Baron Wolfson of Sunningdale (1935–2021), British politician
- David Wolkowsky (1919–2018), American real estate developer
- David Wolman, American journalist
- David Wolpe (born 1958), American rabbi
- David L. Wolper (1928–2010), American producer
- David Wolpert, American mathematician
- David Wolstencroft (born 1969), British-American screenwriter
- David Woodard (born 1964), American businessman
- David Woodbury, American politician
- David Woodcock (1785–1835), American lawyer and politician
- David Woodcock (musician), English singer-songwriter
- David Woodfield (1943–2025), English footballer
- David Woodhouse, American architect
- David Woodhouse (priest) (born 1949), English priest
- David Woodley (1958–2003), American football player
- David Woodworth (1939–1994), Irish priest
- David Wootton (lord mayor), British lawyer and politician
- David Wootton (historian) (born 1952), British historian
- David Worby, American lawyer
- David Worthington (sculptor) (born 1962), British sculptor
- David Wratt (born 1949), New Zealand climate scientist
- David Wroblewski (born 1959), American novelist
- David R. Wrone (born 1933), American academic
- David Wulff (born 1985), German politician
- David Wurmser, Swiss-American foreign policy specialist
- David Wyman (1929–2018), American author
- David Wyndorf (born 1956), American singer-songwriter
- David Wynn (1972–2015), Canadian police officer
- David Wysong (born 1949), American politician

=== X ===
- David Xiao (born 1960). Chinese-Canadian businessman and politician
- David Ximenes (1777–1848), British army officer

=== Y ===
- David Yaari (born 1969), American-Israeli entrepreneur
- David Yacovone, American politician
- David Yale (1928–2021), English legal scholar
- David Yallop (1937–2018), British author
- David Yalof, American academic
- David Yakobashvili (born 1957), Georgian entrepreneur
- David Yancey (born 1972), American politician
- David Yankey (born 1992), Australian-American football player
- David Yaras, American mobster
- David Yareboinen, Papua New Guinean soccer referee
- David Yarnold (born 1952), American naturalist
- David Yarritu, American musician
- David Yarrow (born 1966), British photographer
- David Yates (born 1963), British film director
- David Yau Yau, South Sudanese politician
- David Yazbek (born 1961), American writer
- David Yeagley (1951–2014), American composer
- David Yeandle (1955–2025), British Germanist
- David Yee (born 1977), Canadian actor
- David Yellin (1864–1941), Israeli educator and politician
- David Yencken (1931–2019), Australian businessman
- David Yerushalmi (born 1956), American lawyer
- David Yetman (born 1941), American academic
- David Yeung, Hong Kong entrepreneur
- David Yewdall (1950–2017), American sound mixer
- David Yezzi (born 1966), American poet
- David Zink Yi (born 1973), Peruvian artist
- David Yip (born 1951), British actor
- David B. Yoffie (born 1954), American professor
- David Yonggi Cho (1936–2021), South Korean minister
- David Yontef, American television personality
- David Yoo (born 1974), American writer
- David Yow (born 1960), American musician and actor
- David Yu (born 1967), American entrepreneur
- David Yudelman, South African-Canadian writer
- David Yuengling (1808–1877), American businessman
- David Z. T. Yui (1882–1936), Chinese religious figure
- David Levy Yulee (1810–1886), American politician
- David Yurchenko (born 1986), Armenian footballer
- David Yurdiga (born 1964), Canadian politician
- David Yurkovich (born 1964), American comic artist and writer

=== Z ===
- David T. Zabecki (born 1947), American historian
- David Zabel (born 1966), American television producer
- David Zábranský (born 1977), Czech writer
- David Zabriskie (born 1979), American cyclist
- David Zabriskie (wrestler) (born 1986), American wrestler
- David Zafer (1934–2019), Canadian violinist
- David Zaffiro, American guitarist
- David Zaharakis (born 1990), Greek Australian rules footballer
- David Záizar (1930–1982), Mexican singer
- David Zakai (1886–1978), Belariusian-Israeli journalist
- David Zalkaliani (born 1968), Georgian diplomat
- David Zalzman (born 1996), Venezuelan footballer
- David Zarefsky (born 1946), American scholar
- David Zarifa, Canadian academic
- David Zaslav (born 1960), American business executive
- David Zatezalo (born 1955), American corporate executive
- David Zawada (born 1990), German mixed martial artist
- David Zayas (born 1962), Puerto Rican actor
- David Zdrilic (born 1974), Australian footballer
- David Zec (born 2000), Slovenian footballer
- David Zed (born 1960), American actor
- David Zeisberger (1721–1808), Moravian clergyman and missionary
- David Zellner (born 1974), American film director
- David Zennie (born 1988), American director
- David Zepeda (born 1973), Mexican actor and model
- David Zhuang (born 1963), Chinese-American table tennis player
- David Zhu (born 1990), Chinese race car driver
- David Zinczenko (born 1969), American publisher
- David Zindell (born 1952), American writer
- David Zink (born 1991), Austrian footballer
- David Zinman (born 1936), American conductor and violinist
- David Zinn, American costume designer
- David Zippel (born 1954), American theatre director
- David Zitelli (born 1968), French footballer
- David Zollo (born 1969), American singer-songwriter
- David Zonshine, American talent manager
- David Zoppetti (born 1962), Swiss-Japanese writer
- David Zoubek (born 1974), Czech footballer
- David Zowie (born 1981), English disc jockey
- David Zubik (born 1949), American prelate
- David Zucchino, American journalist
- David Zucker (born 1947), American film director
- David zum Brunnen (born 1963), American actor
- David Zurabishvili (born 1957), Georgian politician
- David Zurawik (born 1949), American journalist
- David Zurutuza (born 1986), Spanish-French footballer
- Dávid Zvara (born 1994), Hungarian footballer
- David E. Zweifel (1934–2022), American diplomat
- David Zwilling (born 1949), Austrian skier
- David Zwirner (born 1964), German art dealer
- David Zwonitzer (born 1953), American politician

== Disambiguation pages ==
=== * ===
- David (disambiguation), multiple people
- David I (disambiguation), multiple people
- David II (disambiguation), multiple people
- David III (disambiguation), multiple people
- David IV (disambiguation), multiple people
- David V (disambiguation), multiple people
- King David (disambiguation), multiple people

=== A ===
- David Abbott (disambiguation), multiple people
- David Abraham (disambiguation), multiple people
- David Abrahams (disambiguation), multiple people
- David Adam (disambiguation), multiple people
- David Adams (disambiguation), multiple people
- David Adler (disambiguation), multiple people
- David Affengruber (disambiguation), multiple people
- David Alexander (disambiguation), multiple people
- David Allen (disambiguation), multiple people
- David Álvarez (disambiguation), multiple people
- David Ames (disambiguation), multiple people
- David Anderson (disambiguation), multiple people
- David Andersson (disambiguation), multiple people
- David Andrews (disambiguation), multiple people
- David Anthony (disambiguation), multiple people
- David Armitage (disambiguation), multiple people
- David Armstrong (disambiguation), multiple people
- David Arnold (disambiguation), multiple people
- David Arnot (disambiguation), multiple people
- David Ash (disambiguation), multiple people
- David Atkinson (disambiguation), multiple people
- David Austin (disambiguation), multiple people
- David Axelrod (disambiguation), multiple people

=== B ===
- David Bach (disambiguation), multiple people
- David Bacon (disambiguation), multiple people
- David Bailey (disambiguation), multiple people
- David Bainbridge (disambiguation), multiple people
- David Baird (disambiguation), multiple people
- David Baker (disambiguation), multiple people
- David Ball (disambiguation), multiple people
- David Banks (disambiguation), multiple people
- David Barlow (disambiguation), multiple people
- David Barnes (disambiguation), multiple people
- David Barnett (disambiguation), multiple people
- David Barr (disambiguation), multiple people
- David Barrett (disambiguation), multiple people
- David Barry (disambiguation), multiple people
- David Barton (disambiguation), multiple people
- David Bass (disambiguation), multiple people
- David Bates (disambiguation), multiple people
- David Beaty (disambiguation), multiple people
- David Bednar (disambiguation), multiple people
- David Bell (disambiguation), multiple people
- David Bennett (disambiguation), multiple people
- David Benoit (disambiguation), multiple people
- David Bentley (disambiguation), multiple people
- David Berger (disambiguation), multiple people
- David Berman (disambiguation), multiple people
- David Bernard (disambiguation), multiple people
- David Bernstein (disambiguation), multiple people
- David Berry (disambiguation), multiple people
- David Best (disambiguation), multiple people
- David Bianco (disambiguation), multiple people
- David Bingham (disambiguation), multiple people
- David Bird (disambiguation), multiple people
- David Bishop (disambiguation), multiple people
- David Black (disambiguation), multiple people
- David Blackburn (disambiguation), multiple people
- David Blair (disambiguation), multiple people
- David Blue (disambiguation), multiple people
- David Bond (disambiguation), multiple people
- David Booth (disambiguation), multiple people
- David Bowen (disambiguation), multiple people
- David Bowman (disambiguation), multiple people
- David Boyd (disambiguation), multiple people
- David Boyle (disambiguation), multiple people
- David Bradley (disambiguation), multiple people
- David Braine (disambiguation), multiple people
- David Brandon (disambiguation), multiple people
- David Brandt (disambiguation), multiple people
- David Bray (disambiguation), multiple people
- David Brewer (disambiguation), multiple people
- David Briggs (disambiguation), multiple people
- David Bright (disambiguation), multiple people
- David Brink (disambiguation), multiple people
- David Brody (disambiguation), multiple people
- David Bromley (disambiguation), multiple people
- David Brophy (disambiguation), multiple people
- David Brown (disambiguation), multiple people
- David Bruton (disambiguation), multiple people
- David Bryant (disambiguation), multiple people
- David Buchanan (disambiguation), multiple people
- David Bull (disambiguation), multiple people
- David Burke (disambiguation), multiple people
- David Burnet (disambiguation), multiple people
- David Burns (disambiguation), multiple people
- David Burton (disambiguation), multiple people
- David Bush (disambiguation), multiple people
- David Butler (disambiguation), multiple people
- David Byrd (disambiguation), multiple people
- David Byrne (disambiguation), multiple people

=== C ===
- David Cain (disambiguation), multiple people
- David Calder (disambiguation), multiple people
- David Caldwell (disambiguation), multiple people
- David Cameron (disambiguation), multiple people
- David Campbell (disambiguation), multiple people
- David Cannon (disambiguation), multiple people
- David Cane (disambiguation), multiple people
- David Carnegie (disambiguation), multiple people
- David Carpenter (disambiguation), multiple people
- David Carr (disambiguation), multiple people
- David Carroll (disambiguation), multiple people
- David Carson (disambiguation), multiple people
- David Carter (disambiguation), multiple people
- David Cass (disambiguation), multiple people
- David Castillo (disambiguation), multiple people
- David Chadwick (disambiguation), multiple people
- David Chandler (disambiguation), multiple people
- David Chang (disambiguation), multiple people
- David Chapman (disambiguation), multiple people
- David Charles (disambiguation), multiple people
- David Chiu (disambiguation), multiple people
- David Christian (disambiguation), multiple people
- David Chu (disambiguation), multiple people
- David Chung (disambiguation), multiple people
- David Clark (disambiguation), multiple people
- David Clarke (disambiguation), multiple people
- David Clarkson (disambiguation), multiple people
- David Clayton (disambiguation), multiple people
- David Clements (disambiguation), multiple people
- David Coates (disambiguation), multiple people
- David Cobb (disambiguation), multiple people
- David Coburn (disambiguation), multiple people
- David Coe (disambiguation), multiple people
- David Cohen (disambiguation), multiple people
- David Cole (disambiguation), multiple people
- David Coleman (disambiguation), multiple people
- David Collier (disambiguation), multiple people
- David Collins (disambiguation), multiple people
- David Cook (disambiguation), multiple people
- David Cooper (disambiguation), multiple people
- David Coote (disambiguation), multiple people
- David Copperfield (disambiguation), multiple people
- David Corbett (disambiguation), multiple people
- David Cortés (disambiguation), multiple people
- David Coulter (disambiguation), multiple people
- David Cousins (disambiguation), multiple people
- David Cox (disambiguation), multiple people
- David Crane (disambiguation), multiple people
- David Crawford (disambiguation), multiple people
- David Croft (disambiguation), multiple people
- David Crosby (disambiguation), multiple people
- David Cross (disambiguation), multiple people
- David Crow (disambiguation), multiple people
- David Crowe (disambiguation), multiple people
- David Cullen (disambiguation), multiple people
- David Cummings (disambiguation), multiple people
- David Cunningham (disambiguation), multiple people
- David Currie (disambiguation), multiple people
- David Curtis (disambiguation), multiple people

=== D ===
- David Dahl (disambiguation), multiple people
- David Daly (disambiguation), multiple people
- David Daniels (disambiguation), multiple people
- David Darling (disambiguation), multiple people
- David Darlow (disambiguation), multiple people
- David Davidson (disambiguation), multiple people
- David Davies (disambiguation), multiple people
- David Davis (disambiguation), multiple people
- David Dawson (disambiguation), multiple people
- David Day (disambiguation), multiple people
- David Demarest (disambiguation), multiple people
- David Dempsey (disambiguation), multiple people
- David Dennis (disambiguation), multiple people
- David Dennison (disambiguation), multiple people
- David de Rothschild (disambiguation), multiple people
- David Devine (disambiguation), multiple people
- David Diamond (disambiguation), multiple people
- David Diaz (disambiguation), multiple people
- David Dickinson (disambiguation), multiple people
- David Dickson (disambiguation), multiple people
- David Dixon (disambiguation), multiple people
- David Dodd (disambiguation), multiple people
- David Dodge (disambiguation), multiple people
- David Donaldson (disambiguation), multiple people
- David Dorfman (disambiguation), multiple people
- David Doty (disambiguation), multiple people
- David Douglas (disambiguation), multiple people
- David Douglass (disambiguation), multiple people
- David Doyle (disambiguation), multiple people
- David Drake (disambiguation), multiple people
- David Drew (disambiguation), multiple people
- David Drummond (disambiguation), multiple people
- David Drury (disambiguation), multiple people
- David Duggan (disambiguation), multiple people
- David Duke (disambiguation), multiple people
- David Duncan (disambiguation), multiple people
- David Dunn (disambiguation), multiple people
- David Durham (disambiguation), multiple people
- David Dye (disambiguation), multiple people
- David Dyson (disambiguation), multiple people

=== E ===
- David Earl (disambiguation), multiple people
- David Eccles (disambiguation), multiple people
- David Edgar (disambiguation), multiple people
- David Edmonds (disambiguation), multiple people
- David Edwards (disambiguation), multiple people
- David Einhorn (disambiguation), multiple people
- David Eisner (disambiguation), multiple people
- David Elliott (disambiguation), multiple people
- David Ellis (disambiguation), multiple people
- David Emanuel (disambiguation), multiple people
- David Emmanuel (disambiguation), multiple people
- David Engel (disambiguation), multiple people
- David English (disambiguation), multiple people
- David Epstein (disambiguation), multiple people
- David Estrada (disambiguation), multiple people
- David Evans (disambiguation), multiple people

=== F ===
- David Faber (disambiguation), multiple people
- David Fanning (disambiguation), multiple people
- David Farrar (disambiguation), multiple people
- David Farrell (disambiguation), multiple people
- David Faulkner (disambiguation), multiple people
- David Feinstein (disambiguation), multiple people
- David Feldman (disambiguation), multiple people
- David Ferguson (disambiguation), multiple people
- David Fernández (disambiguation), multiple people
- David Ferry (disambiguation), multiple people
- David Fischer (disambiguation), multiple people
- David Field (disambiguation), multiple people
- David Finch (disambiguation), multiple people
- David Finlay (disambiguation), multiple people
- David Finley (disambiguation), multiple people
- David Fisher (disambiguation), multiple people
- David Fitzgerald (disambiguation), multiple people
- David Fitzpatrick (disambiguation), multiple people
- David Fleming (disambiguation), multiple people
- David Fletcher (disambiguation), multiple people
- David Flores (disambiguation), multiple people
- David Flynn (disambiguation), multiple people
- David Foley (disambiguation), multiple people
- David Forbes (disambiguation), multiple people
- David Ford (disambiguation), multiple people
- David Foster (disambiguation), multiple people
- David Fowler (disambiguation), multiple people
- David Fox (disambiguation), multiple people
- David Frank (disambiguation), multiple people
- David Frankel (disambiguation), multiple people
- David Franklin (disambiguation), multiple people
- David Franks (disambiguation), multiple people
- David Fraser (disambiguation), multiple people
- David Freed (disambiguation), multiple people
- David Freedman (disambiguation), multiple people
- David Freeman (disambiguation), multiple people
- David French (disambiguation), multiple people
- David Friedman (disambiguation), multiple people
- David Frost (disambiguation), multiple people
- David Fry (disambiguation), multiple people
- David Fulton (disambiguation), multiple people

=== G ===
- David Galloway (disambiguation), multiple people
- David Ganz (disambiguation), multiple people
- David Garcia (disambiguation), multiple people
- David Gardner (disambiguation), multiple people
- David Garland (disambiguation), multiple people
- David Garner (disambiguation), multiple people
- David Garrett (disambiguation), multiple people
- David Geaney (disambiguation), multiple people
- David Geddes (disambiguation), multiple people
- David George (disambiguation), multiple people
- David Gibbs (disambiguation), multiple people
- David Gibson (disambiguation), multiple people
- David Gilbert (disambiguation), multiple people
- David Gill (disambiguation), multiple people
- David Gillespie (disambiguation), multiple people
- David Ginsburg (disambiguation), multiple people
- David Glass (disambiguation), multiple people
- David Glover (disambiguation), multiple people
- David Goldberg (disambiguation), multiple people
- David Goldman (disambiguation), multiple people
- David Gomez (disambiguation), multiple people
- David Gonzalez (disambiguation), multiple people
- David Goodall (disambiguation), multiple people
- David Goode (disambiguation), multiple people
- David Goodman (disambiguation), multiple people
- David Gordon (disambiguation), multiple people
- David Gore (disambiguation), multiple people
- David Grace (disambiguation), multiple people
- David Graham (disambiguation), multiple people
- David Grant (disambiguation), multiple people
- David Gray (disambiguation), multiple people
- David Green (disambiguation), multiple people
- David Greene (disambiguation), multiple people
- David Gregory (disambiguation), multiple people
- David Greig (disambiguation), multiple people
- David Griffin (disambiguation), multiple people
- David Griffith (disambiguation), multiple people
- David Griggs (disambiguation), multiple people
- David Grimes (disambiguation), multiple people
- David Grimm (disambiguation), multiple people
- David Gross (disambiguation), multiple people
- David Grossman (disambiguation), multiple people
- David Guest (disambiguation), multiple people
- David Gunn (disambiguation), multiple people

=== H ===
- David Haines (disambiguation), multiple people
- David Hale (disambiguation), multiple people
- David Hall (disambiguation), multiple people
- David Hamilton (disambiguation), multiple people
- David Hammond (disambiguation), multiple people
- David Hancock (disambiguation), multiple people
- David Harding (disambiguation), multiple people
- David Harper (disambiguation), multiple people
- David Harris (disambiguation), multiple people
- David Harrison (disambiguation), multiple people
- David Hart (disambiguation), multiple people
- David Hartman (disambiguation), multiple people
- David Harvey (disambiguation), multiple people
- David Haskell (disambiguation), multiple people
- David Hawk (disambiguation), multiple people
- David Hawkins (disambiguation), multiple people
- David Hayden (disambiguation), multiple people
- David Hayes (disambiguation), multiple people
- David Healy (disambiguation), multiple people
- David Heath (disambiguation), multiple people
- David Henderson (disambiguation), multiple people
- David Henry (disambiguation), multiple people
- David Herman (disambiguation), multiple people
- David Hernandez (disambiguation), multiple people
- David Heron (disambiguation), multiple people
- David Hess (disambiguation), multiple people
- David Hewitt (disambiguation), multiple people
- David Heymann (disambiguation), multiple people
- David Hibbard (disambiguation), multiple people
- David Hickman (disambiguation), multiple people
- David Hicks (disambiguation), multiple people
- David Higgins (disambiguation), multiple people
- David Hill (disambiguation), multiple people
- David Hirst (disambiguation), multiple people
- David Hobson (disambiguation), multiple people
- David Hodge (disambiguation), multiple people
- David Hodges (disambiguation), multiple people
- David Hoffman (disambiguation), multiple people
- David Hoffmann (disambiguation), multiple people
- David Hogg (disambiguation), multiple people
- David Holloway (disambiguation), multiple people
- David Holmes (disambiguation), multiple people
- David Holt (disambiguation), multiple people
- David Hooper (disambiguation), multiple people
- David Hopkins (disambiguation), multiple people
- David Horowitz (disambiguation), multiple people
- David Horton (disambiguation), multiple people
- David Houle (disambiguation), multiple people
- David House (disambiguation), multiple people
- David Houston (disambiguation), multiple people
- David Howard (disambiguation), multiple people
- David Howell (disambiguation), multiple people
- David Hoyle (disambiguation), multiple people
- David Hubbard (disambiguation), multiple people
- David Hudson (disambiguation), multiple people
- David Huff (disambiguation), multiple people
- David Hughes (disambiguation), multiple people
- David Hull (disambiguation), multiple people
- David Hulme (disambiguation), multiple people
- David Humphreys (disambiguation), multiple people
- David Hunt (disambiguation), multiple people
- David Hunter (disambiguation), multiple people
- David Hurwitz (disambiguation), multiple people
- David Hutchinson (disambiguation), multiple people

=== I ===
- David Ireland (disambiguation), multiple people
- David Irving (disambiguation), multiple people
- David Isaac (disambiguation), multiple people
- David Isaacs (disambiguation), multiple people

=== J ===
- David Jack (disambiguation), multiple people
- David Jackson (disambiguation), multiple people
- David Jacobs (disambiguation), multiple people
- David Jacobson (disambiguation), multiple people
- David James (disambiguation), multiple people
- David Jamieson (disambiguation), multiple people
- David Jay (disambiguation), multiple people
- David Jefferson (disambiguation), multiple people
- David Jenkins (disambiguation), multiple people
- David Jennings (disambiguation), multiple people
- David Jensen (disambiguation), multiple people
- David Jimenez (disambiguation), multiple people
- David John (disambiguation), multiple people
- David Johnson (disambiguation), multiple people
- David Johnston (disambiguation), multiple people
- David Jones (disambiguation), multiple people
- David Jordan (disambiguation), multiple people
- David Joseph (disambiguation), multiple people
- David Joy (disambiguation), multiple people
- David Joyce (disambiguation), multiple people
- David Judge (disambiguation), multiple people

=== K ===
- David Kahn (disambiguation), multiple people
- David Kaiser (disambiguation), multiple people
- David Kane (disambiguation), multiple people
- David Kang (disambiguation), multiple people
- David Kaplan (disambiguation), multiple people
- David Karlsson (disambiguation), multiple people
- David Katz (disambiguation), multiple people
- David Kaufman (disambiguation), multiple people
- David Kaye (disambiguation), multiple people
- David Keane (disambiguation), multiple people
- David Keenan (disambiguation), multiple people
- David Keith (disambiguation), multiple people
- David Kelley (disambiguation), multiple people
- David Kelly (disambiguation), multiple people
- David Kemp (disambiguation), multiple people
- David Kennedy (disambiguation), multiple people
- David Kenny (disambiguation), multiple people
- David Kerr (disambiguation), multiple people
- David Kessler (disambiguation), multiple people
- David Key (disambiguation), multiple people
- David Keys (disambiguation), multiple people
- David Kilcoyne (disambiguation), multiple people
- David Kim (disambiguation), multiple people
- David King (disambiguation), multiple people
- David Kirby (disambiguation), multiple people
- David Kirk (disambiguation), multiple people
- David Kirkpatrick (disambiguation), multiple people
- David Klein (disambiguation), multiple people
- David Knight (disambiguation), multiple people
- David Knowles (disambiguation), multiple people
- David Knox (disambiguation), multiple people
- David Kramer (disambiguation), multiple people

=== L ===
- David Lake (disambiguation), multiple people
- David Lale (disambiguation), multiple people
- David Lam (disambiguation), multiple people
- David Lamb (disambiguation), multiple people
- David Lambert (disambiguation), multiple people
- David Lancaster (disambiguation), multiple people
- David Lane (disambiguation), multiple people
- David Lang (disambiguation), multiple people
- David Latta (disambiguation), multiple people
- David Law (disambiguation), multiple people
- David Lawrence (disambiguation), multiple people
- David Lawson (disambiguation), multiple people
- David Leach (disambiguation), multiple people
- David Leadbetter (disambiguation), multiple people
- David Lee (disambiguation), multiple people
- David Leland (disambiguation), multiple people
- David Lemieux (disambiguation), multiple people
- David Leon (disambiguation), multiple people
- David Leonard (disambiguation), multiple people
- David Lester (disambiguation), multiple people
- David Levene (disambiguation), multiple people
- David Levi (disambiguation), multiple people
- David Levin (disambiguation), multiple people
- David Levine (disambiguation), multiple people
- David Levy (disambiguation), multiple people
- David Lewis (disambiguation), multiple people
- David Li (disambiguation), multiple people
- David Lim (disambiguation), multiple people
- David Lindberg (disambiguation), multiple people
- David Lindley (disambiguation), multiple people
- David Lindsay (disambiguation), multiple people
- David Little (disambiguation), multiple people
- David Livingstone (disambiguation), multiple people
- David Lloyd (disambiguation), multiple people
- David Locke (disambiguation), multiple people
- David Lodge (disambiguation), multiple people
- David Loeb (disambiguation), multiple people
- David Logan (disambiguation), multiple people
- David Long (disambiguation), multiple people
- David López (disambiguation), multiple people
- David Lord (disambiguation), multiple people
- David Louie (disambiguation), multiple people
- David Love (disambiguation), multiple people
- David Lowery (disambiguation), multiple people
- David Lucas (disambiguation), multiple people
- David Ludwig (disambiguation), multiple people
- David Lumsden (disambiguation), multiple people
- David Lynch (disambiguation), multiple people
- David Lynn (disambiguation), multiple people
- David Lyons (disambiguation), multiple people

=== M ===
- David MacDonald (disambiguation), multiple people
- David Mack (disambiguation), multiple people
- David MacKenzie (disambiguation), multiple people
- David Macpherson (disambiguation), multiple people
- David Madden (disambiguation), multiple people
- David Mahoney (disambiguation), multiple people
- David Main (disambiguation), multiple people
- David Mallet (disambiguation), multiple people
- David Malone (disambiguation), multiple people
- David Mandelbaum (disambiguation), multiple people
- David Mann (disambiguation), multiple people
- David Manning (disambiguation), multiple people
- David Manson (disambiguation), multiple people
- David Marcus (disambiguation), multiple people
- David Marks (disambiguation), multiple people
- David Marquez (disambiguation), multiple people
- David Marsh (disambiguation), multiple people
- David Marshall (disambiguation), multiple people
- David Martin (disambiguation), multiple people
- David Mason (disambiguation), multiple people
- David Matheson (disambiguation), multiple people
- David Matthews (disambiguation), multiple people
- David Maxwell (disambiguation), multiple people
- David May (disambiguation), multiple people
- David McAllister (disambiguation), multiple people
- David McCabe (disambiguation), multiple people
- David McCarthy (disambiguation), multiple people
- David McClain (disambiguation), multiple people
- David McDonald (disambiguation), multiple people
- David McFadden (disambiguation), multiple people
- David McFarlane (disambiguation), multiple people
- David McGill (disambiguation), multiple people
- David McGowan (disambiguation), multiple people
- David McIntosh (disambiguation), multiple people
- David McKay (disambiguation), multiple people
- David McKean (disambiguation), multiple people
- David McKenna (disambiguation), multiple people
- David McKinney (disambiguation), multiple people
- David McLean (disambiguation), multiple people
- David McLellan (disambiguation), multiple people
- David McMillan (disambiguation), multiple people
- David McNally (disambiguation), multiple people
- David McSweeney (disambiguation), multiple people
- David McWilliams (disambiguation), multiple people
- David Mead (disambiguation), multiple people
- David Mejia (disambiguation), multiple people
- David Mellor (disambiguation), multiple people
- David Meltzer (disambiguation), multiple people
- David Melville (disambiguation), multiple people
- David Mercer (disambiguation), multiple people
- David Merrill (disambiguation), multiple people
- David Meyers (disambiguation), multiple people
- David Michael (disambiguation), multiple people
- David Michel (disambiguation), multiple people
- David Miles (disambiguation), multiple people
- David Miller (disambiguation), multiple people
- David Mills (disambiguation), multiple people
- David Mims (disambiguation), multiple people
- David Miner (disambiguation), multiple people
- David Miranda (disambiguation), multiple people
- David Mitchell (disambiguation), multiple people
- David Moberg (disambiguation), multiple people
- David Mobley (disambiguation), multiple people
- David Monson (disambiguation), multiple people
- David Montgomery (disambiguation), multiple people
- David Moody (disambiguation), multiple people
- David Moon (disambiguation), multiple people
- David Moore (disambiguation), multiple people
- David Morales (disambiguation), multiple people
- David Morgan (disambiguation), multiple people
- David Morrell, multiple people
- David Morris (disambiguation), multiple people
- David Morse (disambiguation), multiple people
- David Moss (disambiguation), multiple people
- David Mullen (disambiguation), multiple people
- David Muller (disambiguation), multiple people
- David Mullins (disambiguation), multiple people
- David Muñoz (disambiguation), multiple people
- David Munson (disambiguation), multiple people
- David Murphy (disambiguation), multiple people
- David Murray (disambiguation), multiple people
- David Myers (disambiguation), multiple people
- David Myles (disambiguation), multiple people

=== N ===
- David Napier (disambiguation), multiple people
- David Nash (disambiguation), multiple people
- David Nathan (disambiguation), multiple people
- David Navarro (disambiguation), multiple people
- David Neal (disambiguation), multiple people
- David Nelson (disambiguation), multiple people
- David Neville (disambiguation), multiple people
- David Newell (disambiguation), multiple people
- David Newman (disambiguation), multiple people
- David Newton (disambiguation), multiple people
- David Nicholas (disambiguation), multiple people
- David Nicholls (disambiguation), multiple people
- David Nichols (disambiguation), multiple people
- David Nicholson (disambiguation), multiple people
- David Nilsson (disambiguation), multiple people
- David Nixon (disambiguation), multiple people
- David Noble (disambiguation), multiple people
- David Nolan (disambiguation), multiple people
- David Noonan (disambiguation), multiple people
- David Norman (disambiguation), multiple people
- David Norris (disambiguation), multiple people
- David North (disambiguation), multiple people
- David Norton (disambiguation), multiple people
- David Novak (disambiguation), multiple people
- David Nunn (disambiguation), multiple people
- David Nye (disambiguation), multiple people

=== O ===
- David O'Brien (disambiguation), multiple people
- David O'Connell (disambiguation), multiple people
- David O'Connor (disambiguation), multiple people
- David Ogilby (disambiguation), multiple people
- David Ogilvy (disambiguation), multiple people
- David O'Keefe (disambiguation), multiple people
- David Oliver (disambiguation), multiple people
- David Olsen (disambiguation), multiple people
- David Oppenheim (disambiguation), multiple people
- David O'Reilly (disambiguation), multiple people
- David Orr (disambiguation), multiple people
- David Orton (disambiguation), multiple people
- David Osborne (disambiguation), multiple people
- David O'Sullivan (disambiguation), multiple people
- David Overton (disambiguation), multiple people
- David Owen (disambiguation), multiple people
- David Oxtoby (disambiguation), multiple people

=== P ===
- David Packer (disambiguation), multiple people
- David Padilla (disambiguation), multiple people
- David Palmer (disambiguation), multiple people
- David Park (disambiguation), multiple people
- David Parker (disambiguation), multiple people
- David Parkes (disambiguation), multiple people
- David Parks (disambiguation), multiple people
- David Parry (disambiguation), multiple people
- David Paterson (disambiguation), multiple people
- David Patrick (disambiguation), multiple people
- David Patten (disambiguation), multiple people
- David Patterson (disambiguation), multiple people
- David Patton (disambiguation), multiple people
- David Paul (disambiguation), multiple people
- David Paulsen (disambiguation), multiple people
- David Paulson (disambiguation), multiple people
- David Payne (disambiguation), multiple people
- David Peacock (disambiguation), multiple people
- David Pearce (disambiguation), multiple people
- David Pearl (disambiguation), multiple people
- David Pearson (disambiguation), multiple people
- David Peel (disambiguation), multiple people
- David Pérez (disambiguation), multiple people
- David Perkins (disambiguation), multiple people
- David Perry (disambiguation), multiple people
- David Peters (disambiguation), multiple people
- David Petersen (disambiguation), multiple people
- David Peterson (disambiguation), multiple people
- David Phelps (disambiguation), multiple people
- David Phillips (disambiguation), multiple people
- David Pierce (disambiguation), multiple people
- David Pimentel (disambiguation), multiple people
- David Pine (disambiguation), multiple people
- David Piper (disambiguation), multiple people
- David Platt (disambiguation), multiple people
- David Poisson (disambiguation), multiple people
- David Pollock (disambiguation), multiple people
- David Pole (disambiguation), multiple people
- David Pollard (disambiguation), multiple people
- David Poole (disambiguation), multiple people
- David Pope (disambiguation), multiple people
- David Porter (disambiguation), multiple people
- David Pratt (disambiguation), multiple people
- David Preece (disambiguation), multiple people
- David Price (disambiguation), multiple people
- David Prior (disambiguation), multiple people
- David Pritchard (disambiguation), multiple people
- David Prosser (disambiguation), multiple people
- David Prowse (disambiguation), multiple people
- David Pugh (disambiguation), multiple people
- David Pye (disambiguation), multiple people

=== Q ===
- David Quinn (disambiguation), multiple people

=== R ===
- David Ramírez (disambiguation), multiple people
- David Ramsay (disambiguation), multiple people
- David Ramsey (disambiguation), multiple people
- David Rankin (disambiguation), multiple people
- David Rappaport (disambiguation), multiple people
- David Ray (disambiguation), multiple people
- David Rea (disambiguation), multiple people
- David Read (disambiguation), multiple people
- David Reed (disambiguation), multiple people
- David Rees (disambiguation), multiple people
- David Reese (disambiguation), multiple people
- David Reich (disambiguation), multiple people
- David Reid (disambiguation), multiple people
- David Reidy (disambiguation), multiple people
- David Reiss (disambiguation), multiple people
- David Reuben (disambiguation), multiple people
- David Reynolds (disambiguation), multiple people
- David Rhodes (disambiguation), multiple people
- David Rice (disambiguation), multiple people
- David Richards (disambiguation), multiple people
- David Richardson (disambiguation), multiple people
- David Riley (disambiguation), multiple people
- David Ritchie (disambiguation), multiple people
- David Robbins (disambiguation), multiple people
- David Roberts (disambiguation), multiple people
- David Robertson (disambiguation), multiple people
- David Robinson (disambiguation), multiple people
- David Rodgers (disambiguation), multiple people
- David Rodriguez (disambiguation), multiple people
- David Rogers (disambiguation), multiple people
- David Romero (disambiguation), multiple people
- David Rose (disambiguation), multiple people
- David Rosen (disambiguation), multiple people
- David Ross (disambiguation), multiple people
- David Roth (disambiguation), multiple people
- David Rothenberg (disambiguation), multiple people
- David Rowe (disambiguation), multiple people
- David Rowland (disambiguation), multiple people
- David Roy (disambiguation), multiple people
- David Royle (disambiguation), multiple people
- David Rubin (disambiguation), multiple people
- David Rubinstein (disambiguation), multiple people
- David Rudolph (disambiguation), multiple people
- David Rumsey (disambiguation), multiple people
- David Rush (disambiguation), multiple people
- David Russell (disambiguation), multiple people
- David Russo (disambiguation), multiple people
- David Rutherford (disambiguation), multiple people
- David Ryan (disambiguation), multiple people

=== S ===
- David Salazar (disambiguation), multiple people
- David Salmon (disambiguation), multiple people
- David Sampson (disambiguation), multiple people
- David Samson (disambiguation), multiple people
- David Samuel (disambiguation), multiple people
- David Samuels (disambiguation), multiple people
- David Sánchez (disambiguation), multiple people
- David Sanders (disambiguation), multiple people
- David Sanford (disambiguation), multiple people
- David Sanger (disambiguation), multiple people
- David Saperstein (disambiguation), multiple people
- David Sassoon (disambiguation), multiple people
- David Sayer (disambiguation), multiple people
- David Schofield (disambiguation), multiple people
- David Schneider (disambiguation), multiple people
- David Schramm (disambiguation), multiple people
- David Schroeder (disambiguation), multiple people
- David Schultz (disambiguation), multiple people
- David Schumacher (disambiguation), multiple people
- David Schwartz (disambiguation), multiple people
- David Scott (disambiguation), multiple people
- David Sears (disambiguation), multiple people
- David Segal (disambiguation), multiple people
- David Seymour (disambiguation), multiple people
- David Shafer (disambiguation), multiple people
- David Shapiro (disambiguation), multiple people
- David Sharp (disambiguation), multiple people
- David Sharpe (disambiguation), multiple people
- David Shaw (disambiguation), multiple people
- David Shepherd (disambiguation), multiple people
- David Sheridan (disambiguation), multiple people
- David Sibley (disambiguation), multiple people
- David Siegel (disambiguation), multiple people
- David Silva (disambiguation), multiple people
- David Silver (disambiguation), multiple people
- David Silverman (disambiguation), multiple people
- David Simmons (disambiguation), multiple people
- David Simon (disambiguation), multiple people
- David Simons (disambiguation), multiple people
- David Simpson (disambiguation), multiple people
- David Sims (disambiguation), multiple people
- David Sinclair (disambiguation), multiple people
- David Singer (disambiguation), multiple people
- David Singh (disambiguation), multiple people
- David Six (disambiguation), multiple people
- David Skinner (disambiguation), multiple people
- David Slater (disambiguation), multiple people
- David Smith (disambiguation), multiple people
- David Smyth (disambiguation), multiple people
- David Snell (disambiguation), multiple people
- David Snow (disambiguation), multiple people
- David Solomon (disambiguation), multiple people
- David Soren (disambiguation), multiple people
- David Spector (disambiguation), multiple people
- David Spence (disambiguation), multiple people
- David Spencer (disambiguation), multiple people
- David Spicer (disambiguation), multiple people
- David Stafford (disambiguation), multiple people
- David Stahl (disambiguation), multiple people
- David Stark (disambiguation), multiple people
- David Starr (disambiguation), multiple people
- David Steele (disambiguation), multiple people
- David Stein (disambiguation), multiple people
- David Steinberg (disambiguation), multiple people
- David Steiner (disambiguation), multiple people
- David Steinmetz (disambiguation), multiple people
- David Stephens (disambiguation), multiple people
- David Stephenson (disambiguation), multiple people
- David Stevens (disambiguation), multiple people
- David Stevenson (disambiguation), multiple people
- David Stewart (disambiguation), multiple people
- David Stirling (disambiguation), multiple people
- David Stone (disambiguation), multiple people
- David Stuart (disambiguation), multiple people
- David Sullivan (disambiguation), multiple people
- David Summers (disambiguation), multiple people
- David Sun (disambiguation), multiple people
- David Suter (disambiguation), multiple people
- David Sutton (disambiguation), multiple people
- David Sweet (disambiguation), multiple people
- David Swift (disambiguation), multiple people
- David Sykes (disambiguation), multiple people
- David Syme (disambiguation), multiple people

=== T ===
- David Tanner (disambiguation), multiple people
- David Tate (disambiguation), multiple people
- David Taylor (disambiguation), multiple people
- David Teague (disambiguation), multiple people
- David Tennant (disambiguation), multiple people
- David Terrell (disambiguation), multiple people
- David Terry (disambiguation), multiple people
- David Thomas (disambiguation), multiple people
- David Thompson (disambiguation), multiple people
- David Thomson (disambiguation), multiple people
- David Thorburn (disambiguation), multiple people
- David Thorne (disambiguation), multiple people
- David Thorpe (disambiguation), multiple people
- David Thornton (disambiguation), multiple people
- David Todd (disambiguation), multiple people
- David Tomlinson (disambiguation), multiple people
- David Tong (disambiguation), multiple people
- David Torrance (disambiguation), multiple people
- David Townsend (disambiguation), multiple people
- David Tucker (disambiguation), multiple people
- David Turner (disambiguation), multiple people
- David Turpin (disambiguation), multiple people
- David Twersky (disambiguation), multiple people
- David Tyler (disambiguation), multiple people
- David Tyrrell (disambiguation), multiple people

=== U ===
- David Unger (disambiguation), multiple people
- David Urquhart (disambiguation), multiple people

=== V ===
- David Valentine (disambiguation), multiple people
- David Vance (disambiguation), multiple people
- David Vaněček (disambiguation), multiple people
- David Vann (disambiguation), multiple people
- David Vaughan (disambiguation), multiple people
- David Vaughn (disambiguation), multiple people
- David Vincent (disambiguation), multiple people
- David Vogel (disambiguation), multiple people

=== W ===
- David Wade (disambiguation), multiple people
- David Wagner (disambiguation), multiple people
- David Wakefield (disambiguation), multiple people
- David Wales (disambiguation), multiple people
- David Walker (disambiguation), multiple people
- David Wall (disambiguation), multiple people
- David Wallace (disambiguation), multiple people
- David Waller (disambiguation), multiple people
- David Walsh (disambiguation), multiple people
- David Walter (disambiguation), multiple people
- David Walton (disambiguation), multiple people
- David Wang (disambiguation), multiple people
- David Ward (disambiguation), multiple people
- David Ware (disambiguation), multiple people
- David Warner (disambiguation), multiple people
- David Warren (disambiguation), multiple people
- David Waters (disambiguation), multiple people
- David Watkin (disambiguation), multiple people
- David Watkins (disambiguation), multiple people
- David Watson (disambiguation), multiple people
- David Watt (disambiguation), multiple people
- David Watters (disambiguation), multiple people
- David Watts (disambiguation), multiple people
- David Wayne (disambiguation), multiple people
- David Weber (disambiguation), multiple people
- David Webster (disambiguation), multiple people
- David Weinstein (disambiguation), multiple people
- David Weintraub (disambiguation), multiple people
- David Weir (disambiguation), multiple people
- David Weiss (disambiguation), multiple people
- David Wellington (disambiguation), multiple people
- David Wells (disambiguation), multiple people
- David Wemyss (disambiguation), multiple people
- David Werner (disambiguation), multiple people
- David West (disambiguation), multiple people
- David Wexler (disambiguation), multiple people
- David Wheatley (disambiguation), multiple people
- David Wheeler (disambiguation), multiple people
- David Whitaker (disambiguation), multiple people
- David Whittaker (disambiguation), multiple people
- David White (disambiguation), multiple people
- David Whiteman (disambiguation), multiple people
- David Wight (disambiguation), multiple people
- David Wightman (disambiguation), multiple people
- David Wilcox (disambiguation), multiple people
- David Wilder (disambiguation), multiple people
- David Wiley (disambiguation), multiple people
- David Wilkie (disambiguation), multiple people
- David Wilkins (disambiguation), multiple people
- David Willey (disambiguation), multiple people
- David Williams (disambiguation), multiple people
- David Williamson (disambiguation), multiple people
- David Willis (disambiguation), multiple people
- David Wills (disambiguation), multiple people
- David Willson (disambiguation), multiple people
- David Wilson (disambiguation), multiple people
- David Wingate (disambiguation), multiple people
- David Winner (disambiguation), multiple people
- David Winter (disambiguation), multiple people
- David Winters (disambiguation), multiple people
- David Wise (disambiguation), multiple people
- David Wohl (disambiguation), multiple people
- David Wolf (disambiguation), multiple people
- David Wolfe (disambiguation), multiple people
- David Wong (disambiguation), multiple people
- David Wood (disambiguation), multiple people
- David Woods (disambiguation), multiple people
- David Woodward (disambiguation), multiple people
- David Worth (disambiguation), multiple people
- David Wotherspoon (disambiguation), multiple people
- David Wrench (disambiguation), multiple people
- David Wright (disambiguation), multiple people
- David Wu (disambiguation), multiple people
- David Wyatt (disambiguation), multiple people
- David Wynne (disambiguation), multiple people

=== Y ===
- David Yaffe (disambiguation), multiple people
- David Yates (disambiguation), multiple people
- David Yelland (disambiguation), multiple people
- David Yost (disambiguation), multiple people
- David Young (disambiguation), multiple people

=== Z ===
- David Zimmer (disambiguation), multiple people
- David Zimmerman (disambiguation), multiple people
- David Zuckerman (disambiguation), multiple people

== Fictional characters ==
- David, a human character on Sesame Street from 1971 to 1989
- David, a vampire from the 1987 American film The Lost Boys
- David of Sassoun, Armenian epic hero
- David 8, an android in the Alien movie franchise
- David Brent, the protagonist of the British TV series The Office
- David Innes, the protagonist of Edgar Rice Burroughs' Pellucidar novels
- David "Dave" Karofsky, a character in the American musical television series Glee
- David "Dave" McFly, a character in the Back to the Future movie series
- David Marcus, a character in the 1984 American science fiction film Star Trek III: The Search for Spock
- David (Solid Snake), one of the main protagonists in the Metal Gear series
- David Martinez (デイビッド・マルティネス), an edgerunner in Cyberpunk: Edgerunners
- David Nolan, a main character in Once Upon a Time
- David Platt, character in British soap opera Coronation Street
- David Leonard Read, character in the Arthur book series and TV series
- David Rose, a main character in the Canadian television sitcom Schitt's Creek
- David Rossi, a main character in the TV series Criminal Minds
- David Seville, producer and manager of the band Alvin and the Chipmunks
- David Singh, character from DC Comics
- David Telford, a recurring character in Stargate Universe
- David Wallace, CEO of Dunder Mifflin on the US TV series The Office
- David Xanatos, one of the main antagonists, turned ally in the animated series Gargoyles
