= David T. Provost =

American business executive

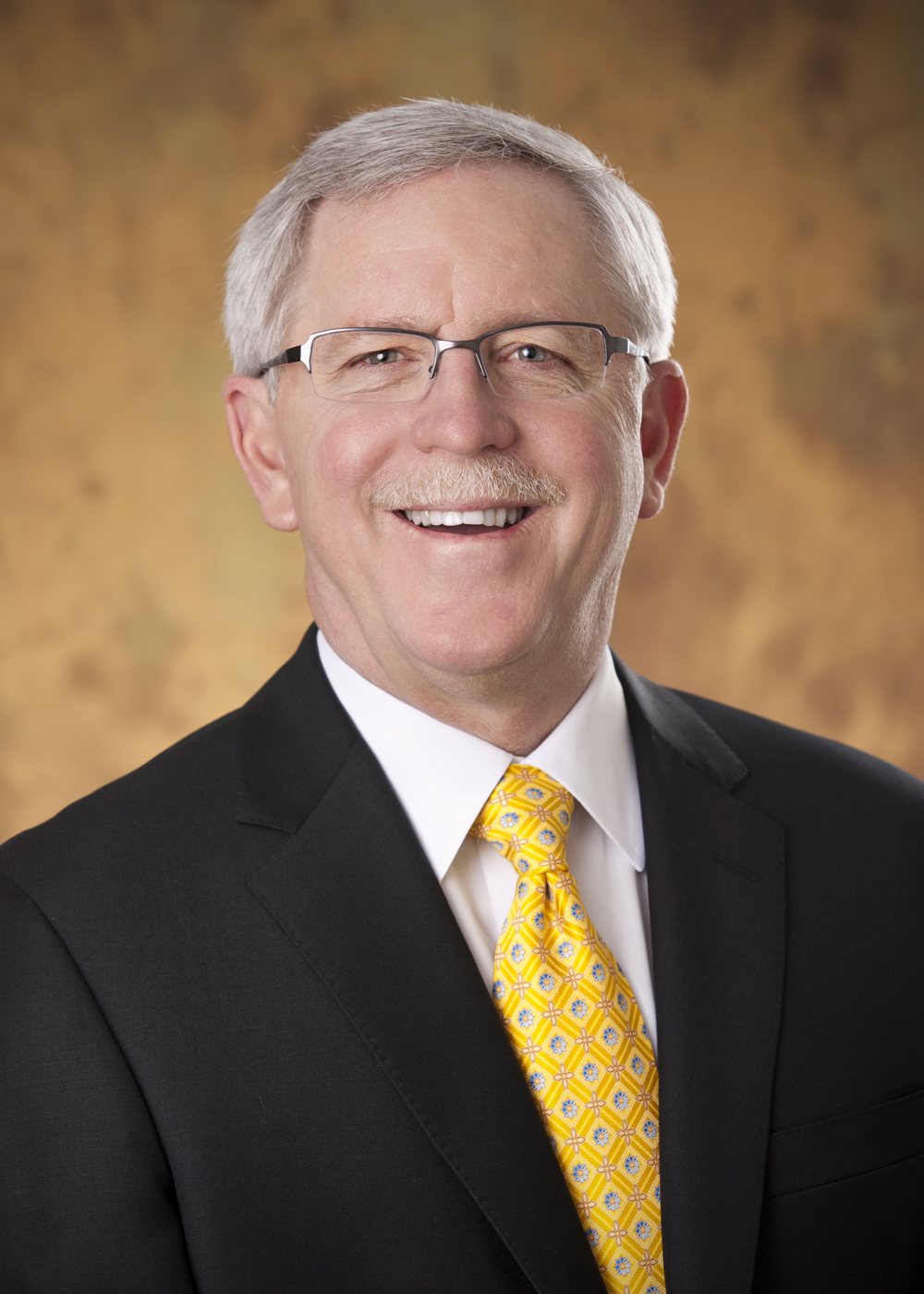
- Occupation: Retired businessman
- Known for: Former vice chairman of TCF Financial Corporation

David T. Provost is a retired businessman and the former vice chairman of TCF Financial Corporation.

== Biography ==
=== Early life and education ===
Provost earned his Bachelor of Arts degree from Alma College and his MBA from Eastern Michigan University, and graduated from the University of Wisconsin School of Banking. Provost also received two honorary doctorates, from Alma College and Eastern Michigan University. He is married with two children.

=== Career ===
Provost was president and CEO of Talmer Bancorp, and chairman, and CEO of Talmer Bank and Trust, a Michigan based community bank.

Prior to joining Talmer Bank and Trust (formerly First Michigan Bank) in 2008, Provost was chairman and CEO of The PrivateBank (formerly The Bank of Bloomfield Hills), which he co-founded in 1989. He also worked at Manufacturers National Bank of Detroit, now known as Comerica Bank, for thirteen years.

Provost is on the board of directors and as Chairman of the Audit Committee for Plastipak Packaging, Inc., located in Plymouth, Michigan. He is on the board of directors for The RESTORE Foundation, the Community Foundation of Southeastern Michigan, the Detroit Economic Club, Eastern Michigan University College of Business, the Partners in Torah Advisory Board, the Presbyterian Village Advisory Board, and is a past chairman of the board of trustees of Alma College.

Provost was named one of Crain's Detroit Business 2010 Newsmakers of the Year. In 2006 and 2015 he was awarded the Ernst and Young Entrepreneur of the Year in the Central Great Lakes Financial Services division. He also received the 2007 Yeshiva Beth Yehudah Outstanding Leadership Award, and is a recipient of Crain's Detroit Business "40 Under 40" business leaders award.
