= Gary Torgow =

American businessman

Gary Torgow (born September 25, 1958) is an American businessman. He is chairman of The Huntington National Bank, a subsidiary of Huntington Bancshares, and is also the founder and executive chairman of Sterling Group, a real estate, development, and investment company based in Detroit, Michigan.

== Education and personal life ==
Torgow has a B.A. degree from Yeshiva University and a J.D. degree from Wayne State University and is married with five children.

== Career ==
In 1988, Torgow founded Sterling Group, a Michigan-based real estate, development, and investment company. As of May 2026, he remains the company's executive chairman, and the company's corporate officers are his sons.

From December 2009 to July 2016, Torgow was chairman of the board of Talmer Bancorp. From August 2016 to August 2019, he was chairman of the board of Chemical Financial Corporation, later renamed TCF Financial Corporation.

In August 2019, upon completion of the merger between Chemical Financial Corporation and TCF Financial Corporation, Torgow joined the board of directors of TCF Financial Corporation.

Torgow and banker David Provost acquired First Michigan Bank and expanded it through a series of acquisitions following the financial crisis. By 2019, the institution had become part of TCF Bank, then the largest bank headquartered in Michigan.

In December 2020, Huntington Bancshares announced that, following its merger with TCF Financial Corporation, Torgow would serve as chairman of the board of directors of The Huntington National Bank.

== Civic and charitable activities ==
Torgow is on the boards of Blue Cross Blue Shield of Michigan, DTE Energy, Community Foundation of Southeastern Michigan, Business Leaders for Michigan, Pope Francis Center, and the Detroit Regional Partnership.

Torgow is also the President of the Jewish Federation of Metropolitan Detroit and of the Yeshiva Beth Yehuda. In 2025, Torgow was selected to chair the board of trustees of the Jewish Federations of North America (JFNA), the umbrella organization representing nearly 150 Jewish federations across the United States and Canada. He had previously served as JFNA's national campaign chair and co-chaired its 2024 General Assembly.

Torgow has also served as chairman of the steering committee of Mosaic United, a partnership focused on strengthening Jewish identity and ties between Israel and Jewish communities abroad.

Torgow was chairman of the Detroit Economic Growth Corporation, the Michigan Civil Rights Commission and First Place Bank. On January 25, 2019, Governor Gretchen Whitmer designated Torgow as one of her emergency interim successors.

In November 2026, Torgow was named one of four chairs of Michigan Governor-elect Jocelyn Benson's 15-member transition leadership council.

He has received a number of honors and awards including the NAACP Fannie Lou Hamer Award, the Urban League of Detroit Distinguished Warrior Award, the Jewish Federation of Metropolitan Detroit's Frank Wetsman Young Leadership Award, the NAACP James Weldon Johnson Lifetime Achievement Award, and the Wayne State University School of Law Outstanding Alumni Award.

He wrote the book Holy Warrior: Rabbi Avrohom Abba Freedman and was the editor of a collection of writings of M. Manuel Merzon entitled Raising the Bar: The Collected Writings of the Chosson Torah, M. Manuel Merzon, and he has given numerous talks and lectures throughout the country.
