= TCF Financial Corporation (1923–2019) =

American financial services company

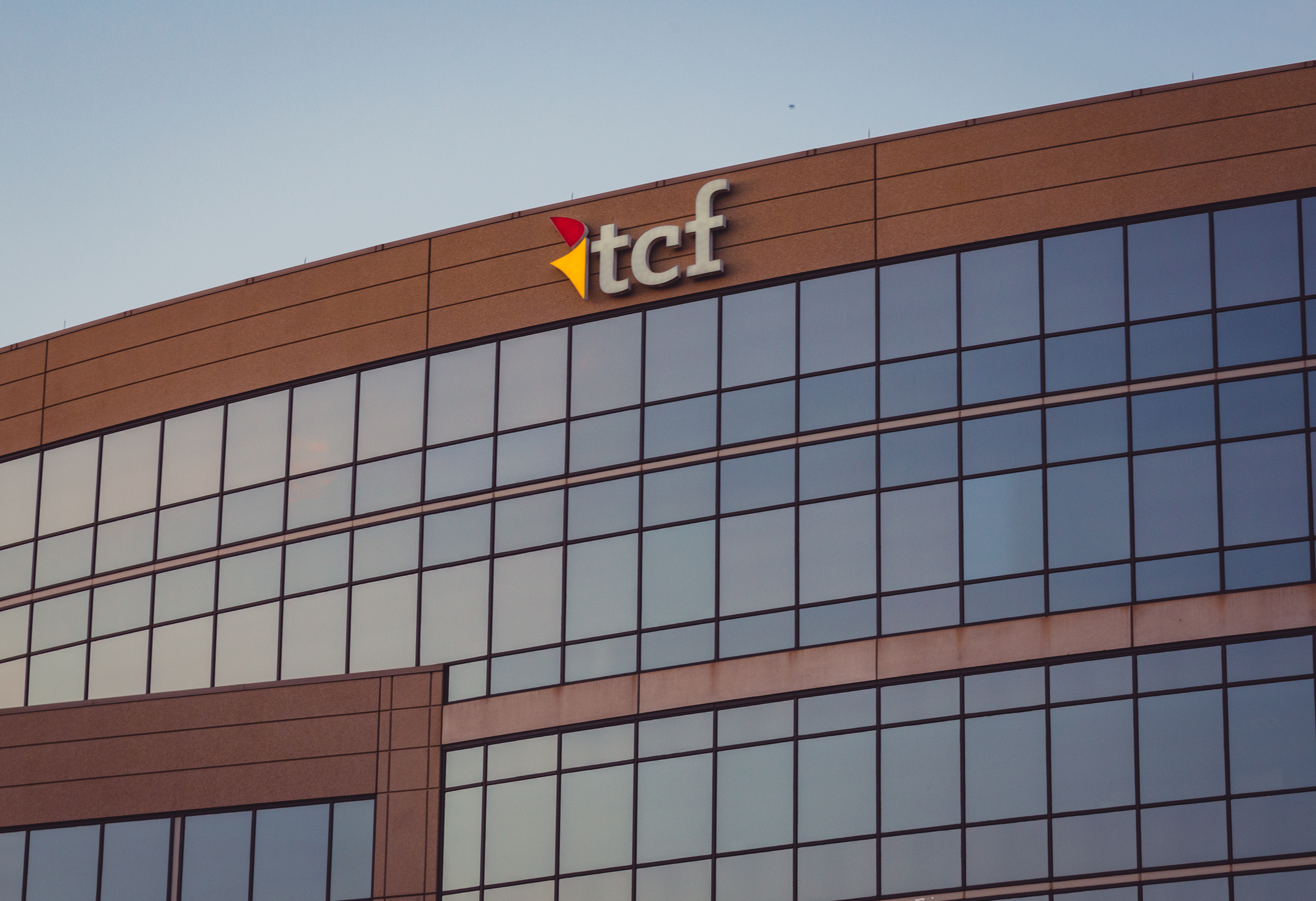
- TCF Corporate headquarters in Wayzata, Minnesota.
- Formerly: Twin City Building and Loan Association (1923–1936); Twin City Federal Savings and Loan Association (1936–1986); TCF Banking and Savings, FA (1986–1993)
- Type: Public
- Traded as: NYSE: TCF
- Industry: Banking
- Founded: 1923; 103 years ago
- Defunct: August 1, 2019; 7 years ago
- Fate: Merged with Chemical Financial Corporation
- Successor: TCF Financial Corporation
- Headquarters: Minneapolis, Minnesota (1923–2003); Wayzata, Minnesota (2003–2019)
- Number of locations: 330 (2019)
- Area served: Midwest and Mountain West
- Total assets: US$18.4 billion (2018)
- Number of employees: 5,338 (2018)
- Website: tcfbank.com

TCF Financial Corporation was an American national bank based in Wayzata, Minnesota. TCF was a holding company until 2019, when it was purchased by the Chemical Financial Corporation, which adopted the TCF name.

As of December 31, 2013, TCF had $18.4 billion in total assets and nearly 430 branches in Minnesota, Illinois, Michigan, Colorado, Wisconsin, Indiana, Arizona, and South Dakota, providing retail and commercial banking services. TCF, through its subsidiaries, also conducted commercial leasing and equipment finance business in all 50 states, commercial inventory finance business in the United States and Canada, and indirect auto finance business in 45 states.

== History ==
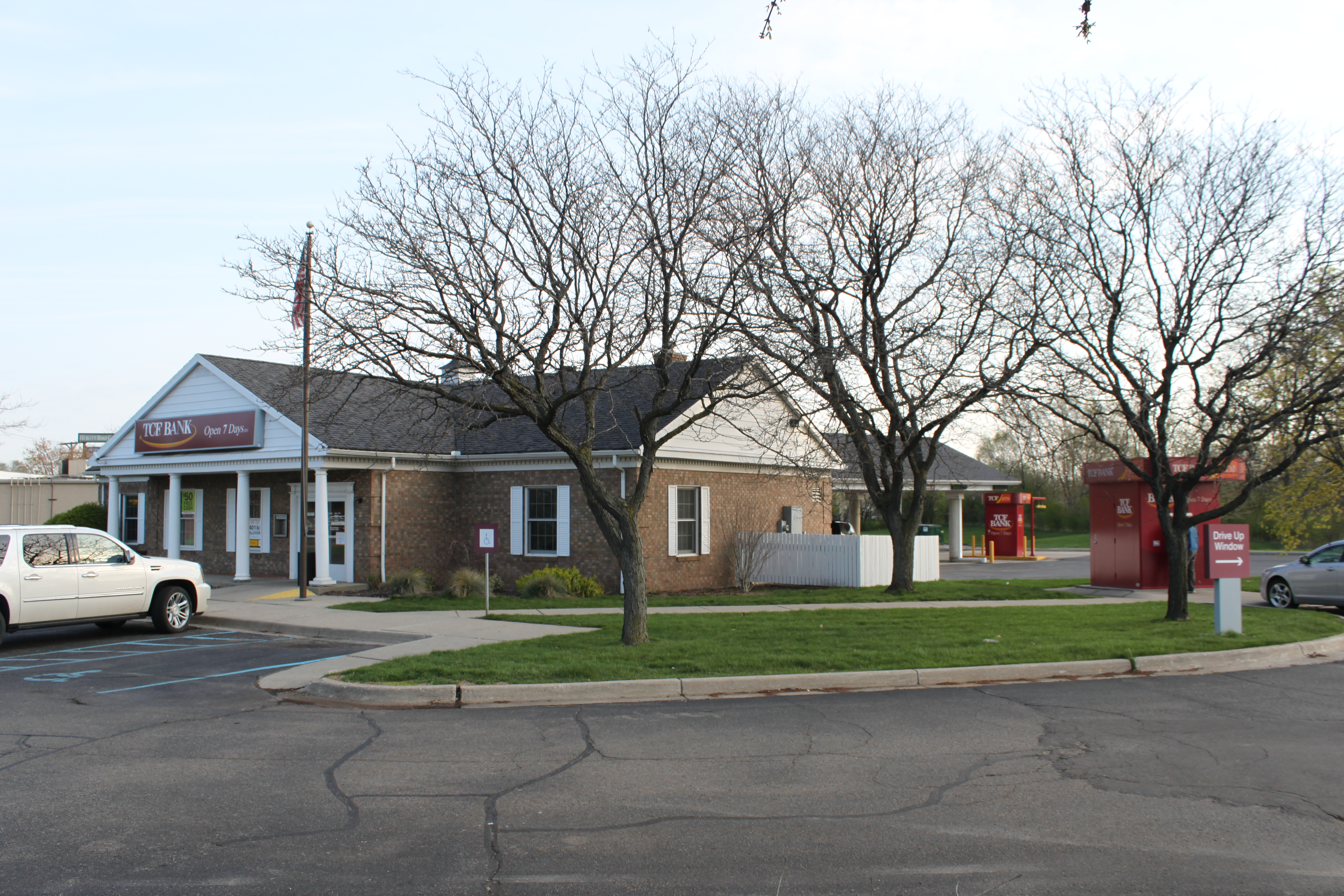
TCF branch in Ypsilanti, Michigan

TCF Financial Corporation began business in 1923 as Twin City Building and Loan Association. In 1936 it was given a federal charter and renamed as Twin City Federal Savings and Loan Association. The company went public in 1986 chartered under the name TCF Banking and Savings, F.A. (TCF Bank). A year later, it reorganized as a holding company, TCF Financial Corporation.

In the 1990s, the company expanded banking into Michigan through the acquisitions of First Federal Savings Bank of Oakland County and Great Lakes National Bank. 1997 saw the acquisition of Winthrop Resources Corporation and 2004 saw the acquisition of VGM Leasing, Inc. In 2008, TCF entered the commercial inventory finance business in the U.S. and Canada with the creation of TCF Inventory Finance, Inc. TCF then entered the indirect auto finance business with the acquisition of Gateway One Lending & Finance in 2011.

On January 28, 2019, Chemical Bank of Detroit announced it would merge with TCF. The new corporation will retain the TCF name, but be headquartered in the tower Chemical is constructing in Detroit. It will maintain large operating centers in Minneapolis and Midland, Michigan.

On August 1, 2019, the bank merged into Chemical Financial Corporation, which assumed the TCF name.

== Controversies ==
=== Overdraft fees ===
In 2010, TCF Bank was sued regarding overdraft charges. The bank processed higher amount transactions first in order to drain customer accounts faster, allowing TCF to then increase the number of total overdraft charges from each of the smaller amounts remaining, as well as charging overdraft fees on a daily basis rather than posing one flat fee. In 2011, TCF Bank changed its overdraft policy to include a daily $28 fee. After public backlash, the bank reversed its policy in 2012.

=== Violation of Bank Secrecy Act ===
In January 2013, the Office of the Comptroller of the Currency assessed a $10 million fine on TCF for violating the Bank Secrecy Act for failure to file suspicious activity reports in a timely fashion.
