= Huntington Bank Stadium =

Home stadium of the Minnesota Golden Gophers. Minneapolis, Minnesota

- "The Bank"

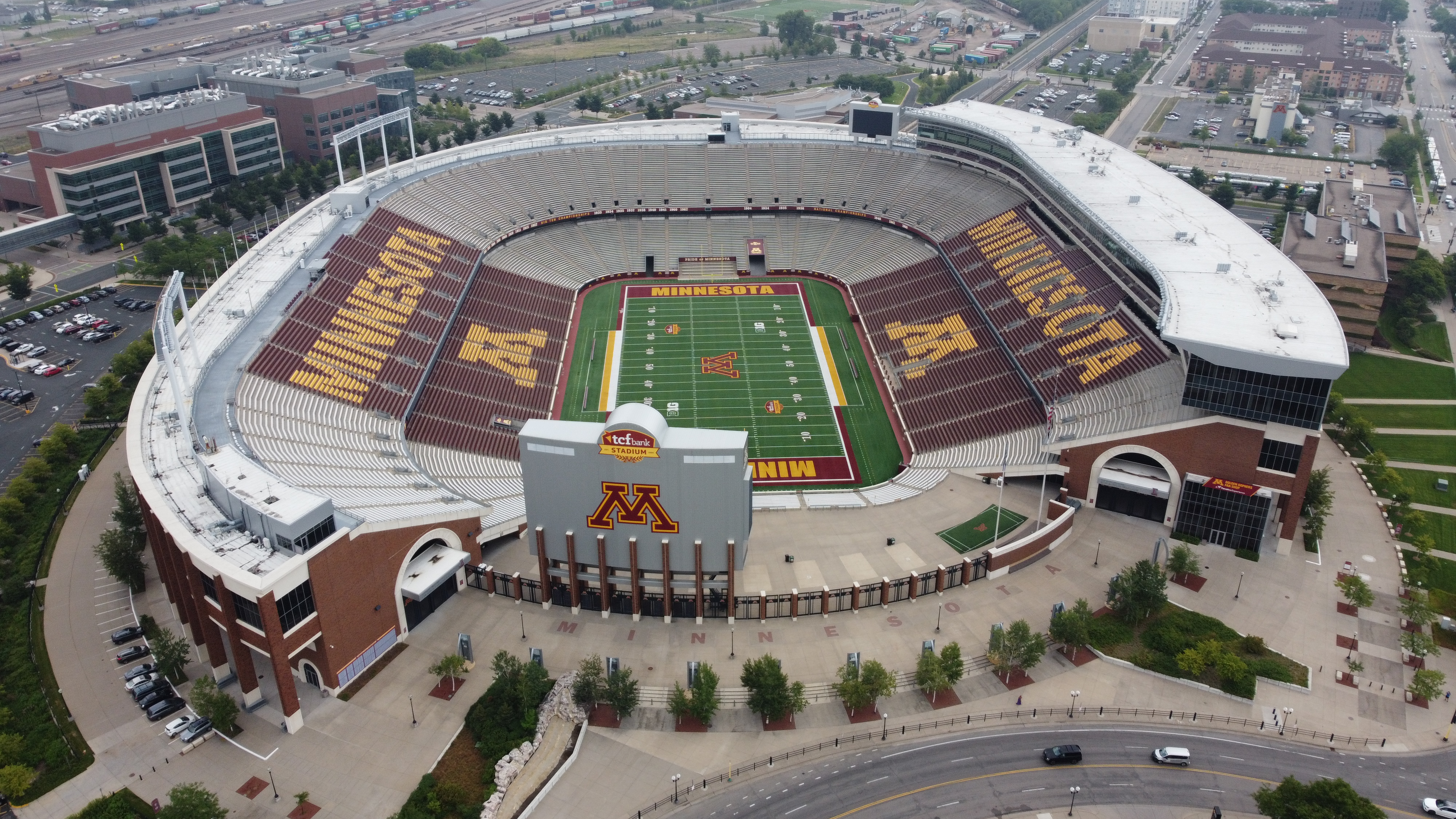
- Huntington Bank Stadium, August 2021

- Location in Minnesota Location in the United States
- Former names: TCF Bank Stadium (2009–2021)
- Address: 420 SE 23rd Avenue
- Location: Minneapolis, Minnesota
- Coordinates: 44.976°N 93.225°W
- Owner: University of Minnesota
- Operator: University of Minnesota
- Capacity: 50,805
- Surface: FieldTurf Revolution
- Record attendance: 54,147 (September 3, 2015 vs. TCU)
- Public transit: Green Line at Stadium Village

Construction
- Groundbreaking: September 30, 2006; 20 years ago
- Opened: September 12, 2009; 17 years ago
- Cost: $303,386,606 ($455 million in 2025 dollars) $7 million Vikings upgrades
- Architects: Populous (formerly HOKSport); Architectural Alliance; Studio Hive
- Structural engineer: Magnusson Klemencic Associates
- Services engineers: R.G. Vanderweil Engineers, LLP
- General contractor: M.A. Mortenson Company

Tenants
- Minnesota Golden Gophers (NCAA) (2009–present); Minnesota Vikings (NFL) (2010, 2014–2015); Minnesota United FC (MLS) (2017–2018)

Website
- gophersports.com/huntington-bank-stadium

Huntington Bank Stadium (formerly known as TCF Bank Stadium) is an outdoor stadium located on the campus of the University of Minnesota in Minneapolis, Minnesota, United States. The stadium opened in 2009 after three years of construction. It is the home field of the Minnesota Golden Gophers of the Big Ten Conference.

The stadium also served as the temporary home of the Minnesota Vikings of the National Football League (NFL) for the 2014 and 2015 seasons during the construction of U.S. Bank Stadium and the Minnesota United FC of Major League Soccer for the 2017 and 2018 seasons during the construction of Allianz Field. The 50,805-seat "horseshoe" style stadium cost $303.3 million to build and is designed to support future expansion to seat up to 80,000.

It was the first new Big Ten football stadium constructed since Memorial Stadium at Indiana University opened in 1960. When it opened, Huntington Bank Stadium boasted the largest home locker room in college or professional football and one of the largest video boards in the nation. Super Bowl winning coach and former quarterback for the Golden Gophers Tony Dungy called the stadium "unbelievable" and Pro Football Hall of Fame wide receiver Cris Carter said that the on-campus facility "will give the University of Minnesota a chance to compete not only in the Big Ten but nationally for some of the best athletes".

== History ==
The stadium is the third on-campus stadium and fourth stadium used for University of Minnesota football. Previous venues have been Northrop Field, Memorial Stadium, and Hubert H. Humphrey Metrodome. It is the first of three spectator sports stadiums that have been built for the major tenants of the Hubert H. Humphrey Metrodome – the Gophers and two professional teams, the Minnesota Twins baseball and Minnesota Vikings football teams.

The Gopher football program played its first game there on September 12, 2009, against the Falcons of the United States Air Force Academy, prevailing 20–13. This was the first football game played on-campus since November 21, 1981, the last game in Memorial Stadium. The highest-ranked AP Top 25 team to visit was #2 TCU in 2015. Iowa is 6–4 against Minnesota in rivalry games played at "The Bank", and one of six ranked opponents that the Gophers have defeated in the new facility (#24 Iowa in 2010, #21 Nebraska in 2013, #4 Penn State in 2019, #11 USC in 2024, #25 Nebraska in 2025, and #15 Iowa in 2026). The 2019 win over Penn State was the first time Minnesota had sold out TCF Bank Stadium since 2015 and was their first win at TCF Bank Stadium against a top 4 ranked opponent. At the conclusion of the 2019 season, the Gopher football team had an all-time record of 48–32 (0.600) in games played at TCF Bank Stadium.

=== Stadium proposal ===
The push for a new on-campus stadium for Golden Gopher football began in the fall of 2000. The university cited poor revenue and lack of a college football atmosphere at the off-campus Hubert H. Humphrey Metrodome as their main reasons for wanting to move back on campus. A plan for a joint Minnesota Vikings/University of Minnesota football stadium was proposed in 2002, but differences over how the stadium would be designed and managed, as well as state budget constraints, led to the plan's failure. In September 2003 a highly publicized attempt was made by T. Denny Sanford to be the lead donor for the project, but in early 2004 the plan fell through when the two parties were unable to come to an agreement on the financial terms. The university unveiled preliminary stadium drawings and a general plan to seek state money and donations in December 2003. On March 24, 2005, the university and TCF Financial Corporation announced the sale of the naming rights in a $35 million transaction. The deal was given an expiration date of December 31, 2005; time enough for the Minnesota Legislature to provide the bulk of funding needed to make the project a reality.

During the remainder of 2005 the university concentrated on drafting a stadium proposal that would draw the support of state politicians. The final plan proposed that the state of Minnesota would contribute 40% of the stadium cost while the university would raise the remaining 60% on its own. Portions of that 60% were to be funded by the TCF naming rights, while the remainder would come from a $50 per semester student fee, private donations, the sale of 2,840 acres (11.5 km^{2}) of university land in rural Dakota County back to the state, and game day parking revenue. Even though the university proposal drew widespread legislative support, the stadium effort suffered a setback when the 2005 legislative session ended before the stadium bill could be heard. Late in 2005 when it became evident that this would happen, the university and TCF Bank announced that it had extended the naming rights deal to June 30, 2006.

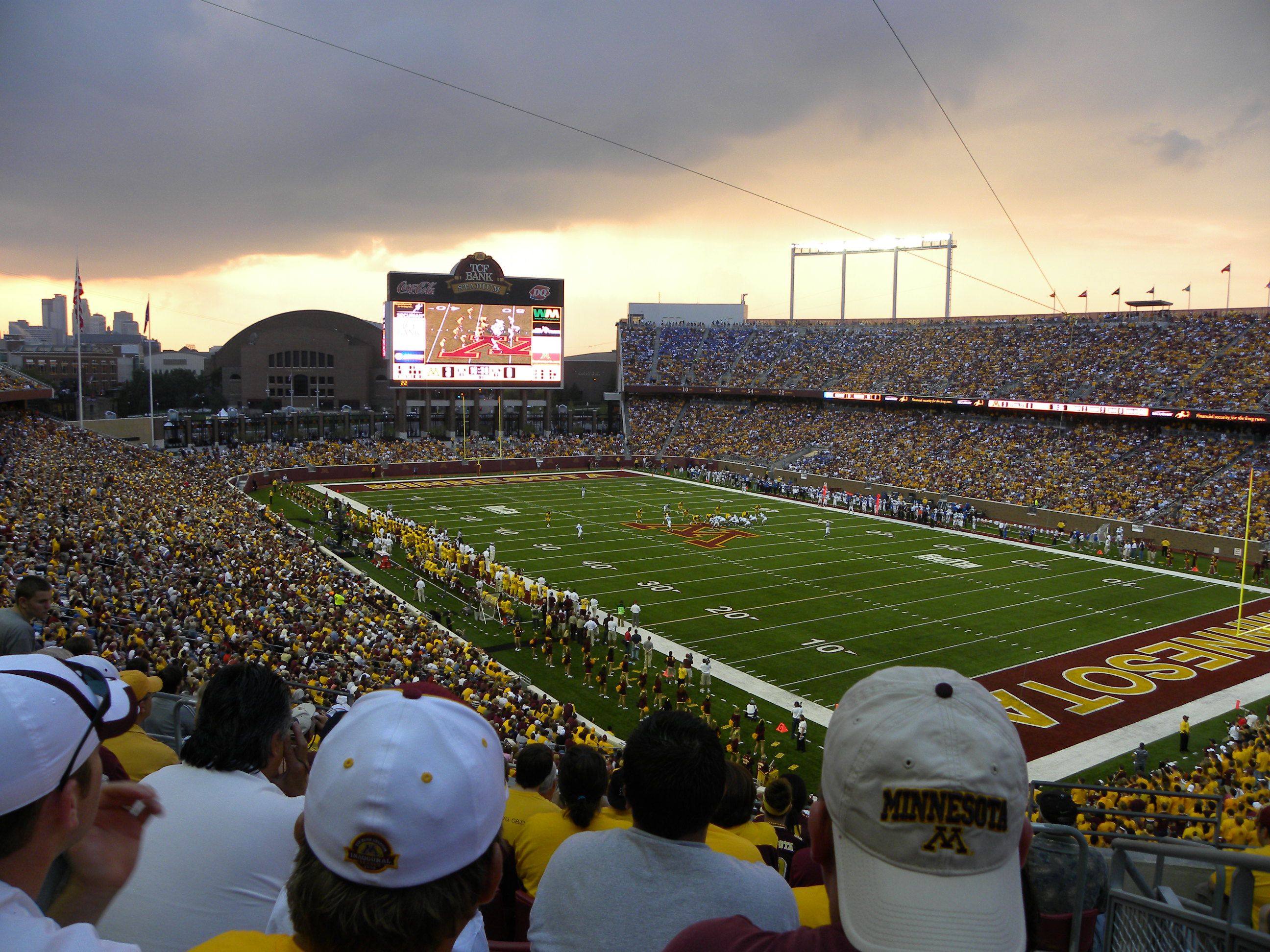
Stadium opener vs. Air Force on September 12, 2009

Despite the 2005 session having ended with the bill not coming to a vote, the stadium effort did not lose momentum in the legislature and was introduced quickly in the 2006 session. On April 6, 2006, the Minnesota House of Representatives passed the stadium bill on a 103–30 vote. The house bill was nearly identical to what the university was proposing and had full university support. However, on May 9, 2006, the Minnesota Senate passed a radically different version of the bill on a 34–32 vote. The Senate version would have removed the TCF naming rights deal, the student fees, and the purchase of the university owned land. The proposed funding that was removed was to be replaced with a statewide tax on sports memorabilia. It also would have required the stadium to be named Veterans Memorial Stadium (similar to the previous on-campus football stadium Memorial Stadium, which was last used in 1981 and demolished in 1992). Governor Tim Pawlenty stated he supported the House version. He signed the bill in May 2006 at the University of Minnesota McNamara Alumni Center.

=== Legislative approval 2006 ===
Even though the differences between the House and Senate bills were major, the details were ironed out and approved on May 19, in a House–Senate conference committee. The naming rights and land sale remained in the bill, as did a scaled down $25 per year student fee. The tax on sports memorabilia as well as the Veterans Memorial Stadium name were voted out. The committee also voted to increase the state contribution to the project to compensate for the smaller student fees. The compromise bill was then approved by both the full house and senate on May 20, and was signed by Governor Tim Pawlenty on May 24.

=== Construction ===
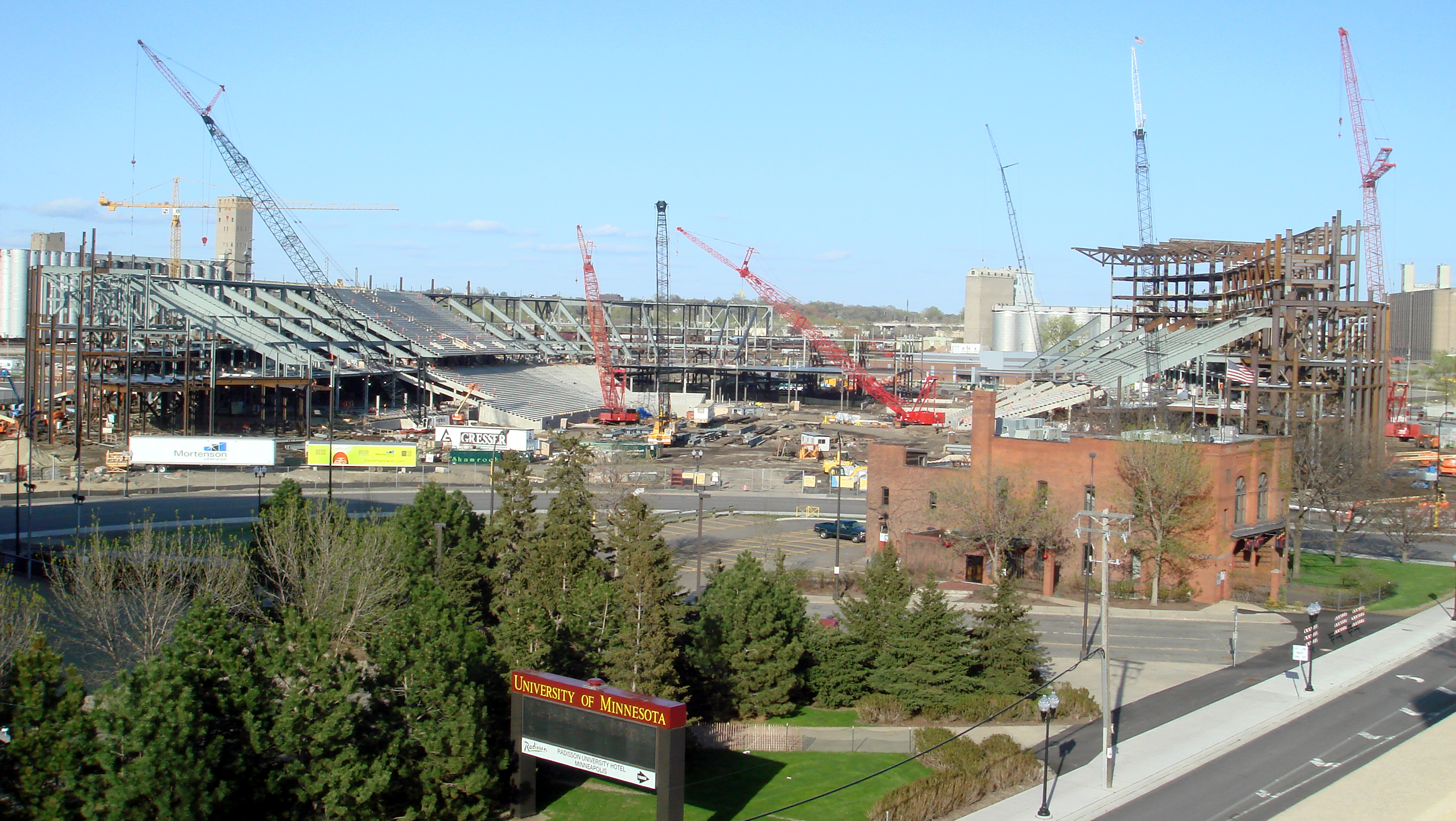
Under construction, May 2008

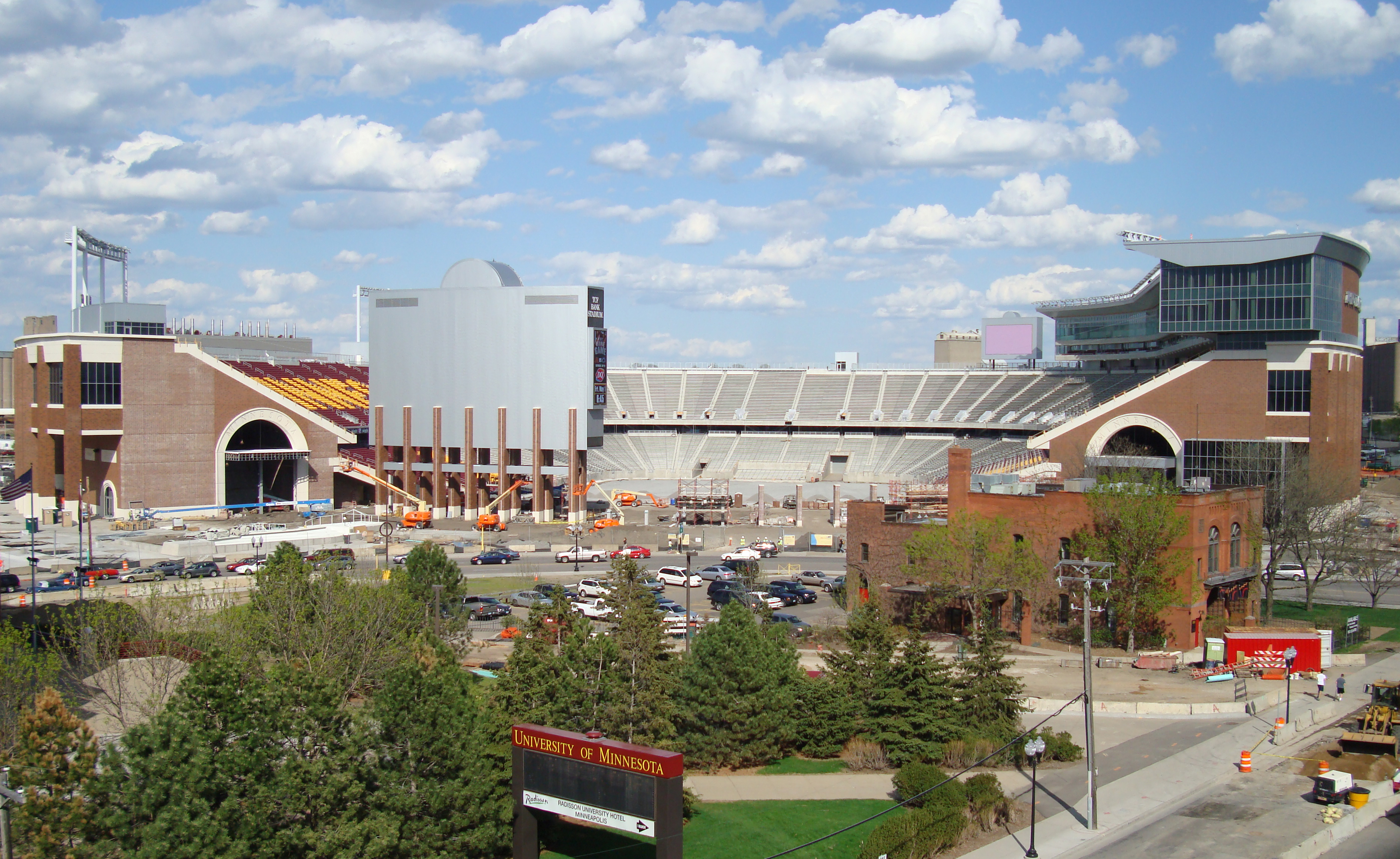
One year later, May 2009

On June 8, 2006, the university announced that it had selected HOK Sport (now Populous) to design the stadium, winning out over finalists HNTB and Crawford Architects. The local firm that worked on the project was Minneapolis-based Architectural Alliance, and M.A. Mortenson Company was the general contractor. Schematic designs of the stadium were presented to the public on January 3, 2007.

Infrastructure work at the stadium site began in late June 2006, and a ceremonial groundbreaking took place at the stadium site on September 30, 2006. The beginning of construction on the stadium itself along with the unveiling of the stadium's logo took place on July 11, 2007. Site preparation and foundation work continued through the summer and fall of 2007. More than 8,800 tons of steel that make up the stadium's skeleton were put in place between January 28, 2007, and June 28, 2008.

=== Name change ===
On June 29, 2021, the university's Board of Regents approved changing the name from TCF Bank Stadium to Huntington Bank Stadium after Huntington Bancshares acquired TCF Financial Corporation. The new name and logo were put into use immediately by the university.

== Location ==
The stadium is located on the northeast side of the Minneapolis campus, near the site of the former Memorial Stadium, across from Williams Arena. The site was previously the Huron Boulevard Parking Complex, where the university's four largest parking lots were located. The address is 2009 University Ave S.E.

The stadium is part of a 75-acre (30 ha) expansion of the Twin Cities campus, the largest since the West Bank was built in the 1960s. Current plans for the area call for the construction of as many as ten new academic buildings by 2015. The Metro Green Line light rail runs near the stadium, with a station in Stadium Village serving the facility. Construction of the Green Line began in 2010 and opened June 14, 2014. The two other major Twin Cities stadiums are located along this line, within a short distance and travel time on the Light rail line.

An environmental impact assessment of the stadium site was conducted by the university between December 2004 and March 2006 at a cost of $1.5 million. The results were approved by the Board of Regents on March 27, 2006.

== Design ==
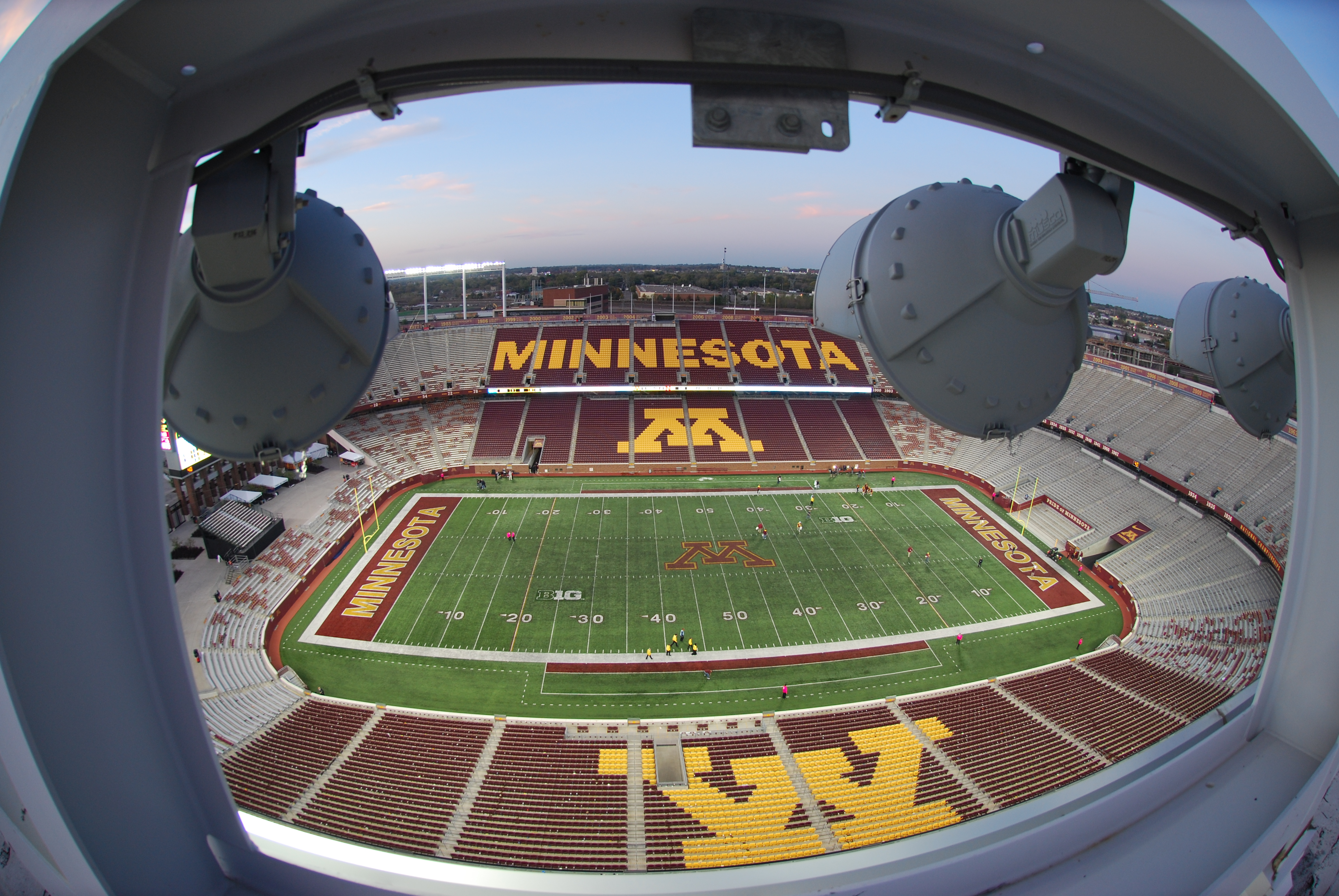
Visitor side from the main light bank on top of the press gallery

The stadium is a horseshoe-style stadium which organizers said would have a "traditional collegiate look and feel". On December 7, 2006, the university announced that the stadium's field would be laid out in an unorthodox east–west configuration, with the open west end of the stadium facing campus. This layout, similar to that of Memorial Stadium, provides a view of downtown Minneapolis.

On September 18, 2009, the University of Minnesota announced that the stadium was awarded LEED Silver Certification, the first college or professional football stadium to achieve LEED certification.

=== General features and football facilities ===
The centerpiece of the stadium is the massive scoreboard, designed and built by Daktronics at a cost of $9 million. At 48 by 108 feet (14.6 m × 32.9 m), the HD-X light-emitting diode (LED) video scoreboard is currently the largest in college football-only stadiums, and was the third-largest at the time of construction.

The playing surface is FieldTurf, an infilled artificial turf, and the brick wall surrounding the playing field was made possible by an alumni donation of $500,000.

Located on the stadium ground level is the Murray Warmath Locker Room, named in honor of the Gophers' national championship-winning coach from 1954 to 1971. It is the largest home locker room in college or professional football, and features a block "M" lighting fixture and 120 custom-built cherry-wood lockers. Adjacent to the locker room are other team areas, including a fully equipped training room, therapy room, medical examination rooms, an equipment room, custom coaches' offices and locker rooms, a home media room, private recruiting room, and a training table for dining and nutrition. After a tour of the complex, Pro Bowl wide receiver Larry Fitzgerald remarked, "This has got to be the best locker room in the Big Ten."

=== Stadium aesthetics ===
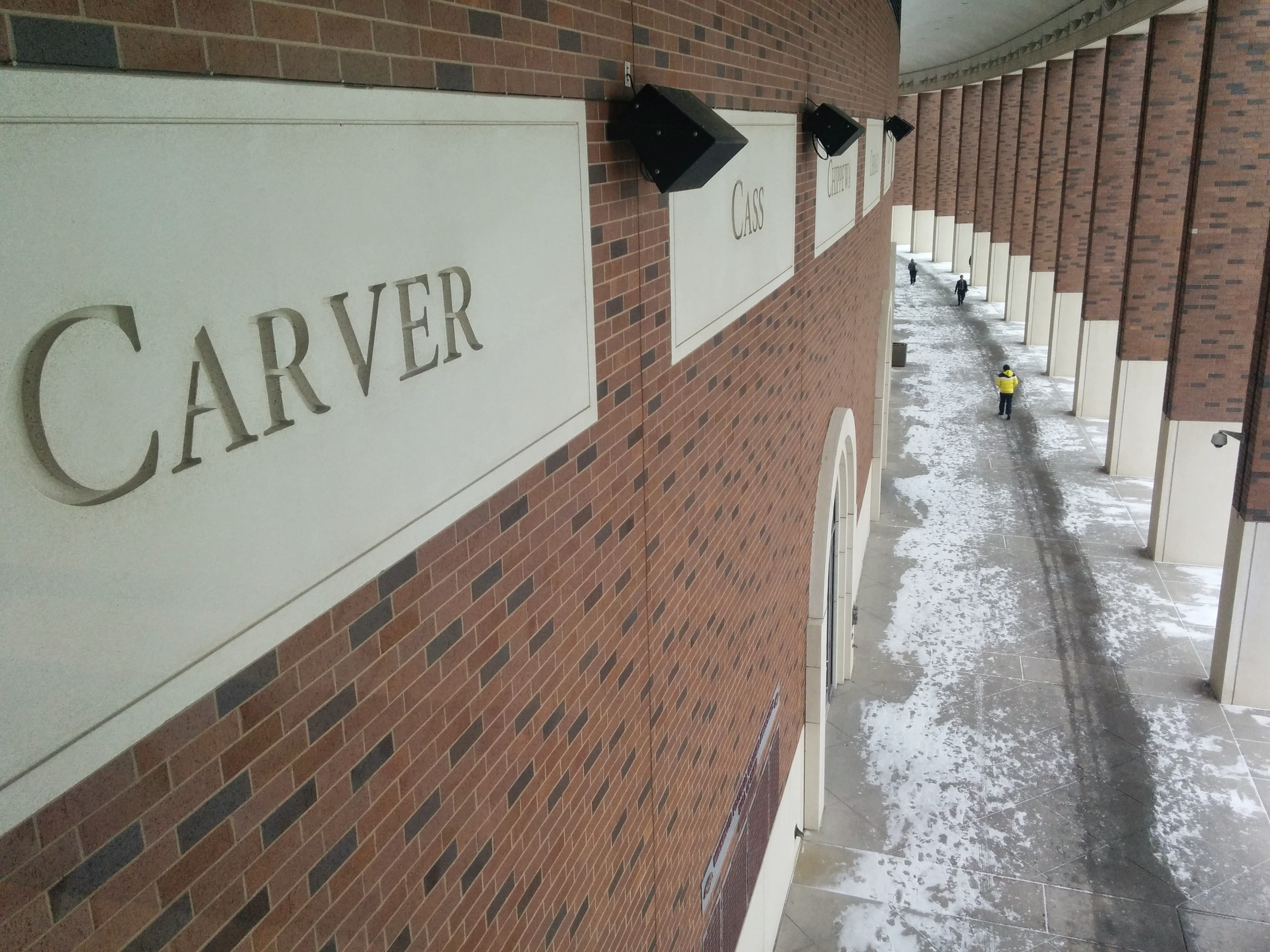
County names carved in stone

To recognize that the venue was paid for with taxes statewide and to pay tribute to the support of Minnesota citizens, the names of the state's 87 counties are cast in stone around the perimeter of the first level. Each is engraved in a piece of cast stone that is 16 by 5.3 feet (4.9 m × 1.6 m) and weighs 6,500 pounds (2,900 kg). These panels are contained within the reminiscent Memorial Wall, which forms the external surface of the stadium building. This brick façade perimeter wall with arched portals reflects the heritage of Memorial Stadium's exterior, and a 360° colonnade provides a year-round walkway around the stadium. Displayed on the façade of the stadium's upper deck are panels commemorating the 7 national championships and 18 Big Ten Conference championships won by Minnesota in football, as well as ones distinguishing the five players whose numbers have been retired by the program.

The Minnesota Tribal Nations Plaza encompasses the main western entrance to the stadium and is named in honor of the 11 Native American nations in Minnesota, featuring eleven 18-foot (5.5 m)-tall sky markers: one for each nation. The stadium also incorporates the Veterans Tribute, a memorial dedicated to Minnesota veterans, located in the open end of the horseshoe near the main plaza.

=== Seating and amenities ===
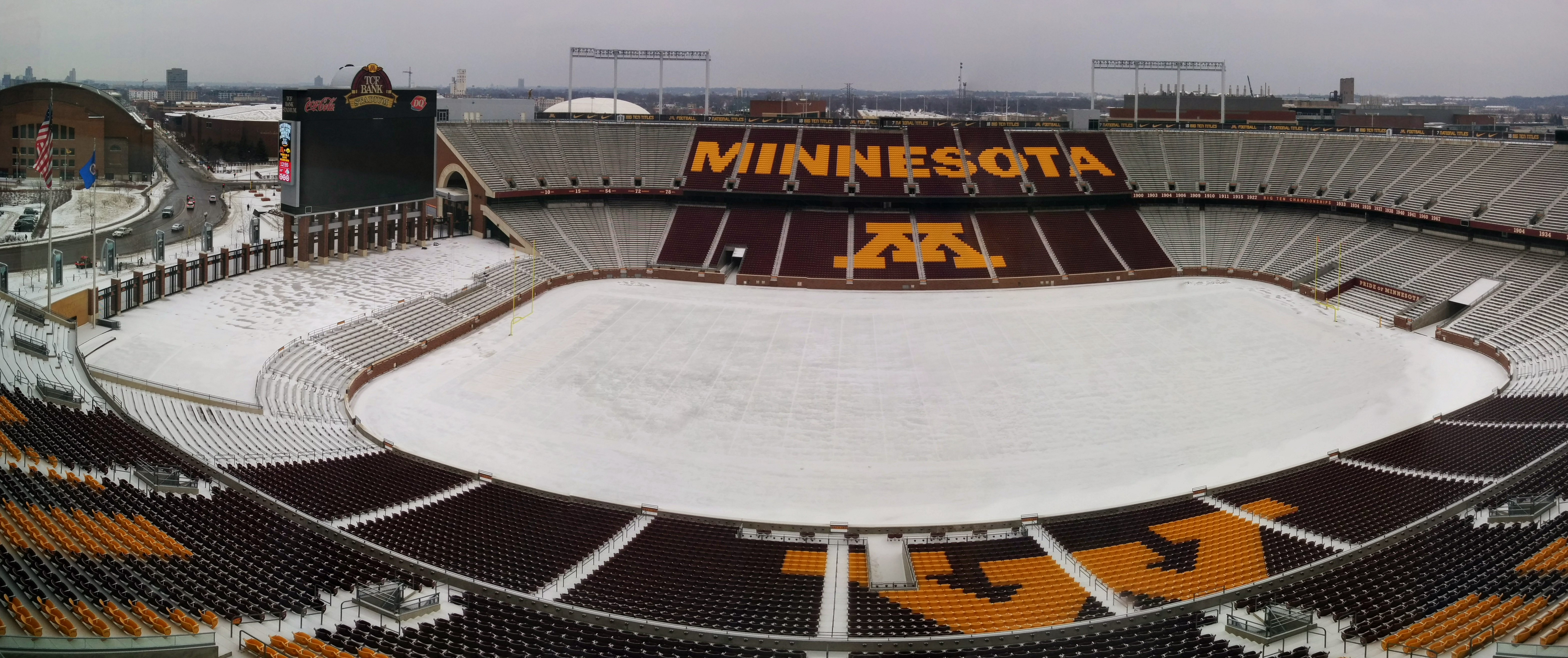
Panorama of seating

The first phase of the construction included about 50,805 seats, with the design able to support future expansion of up to 80,000 seats. The 10,000-seat student section is located at the east end of the stadium, and the area reserved for the University of Minnesota Marching Band is partitioned from it, situated directly behind the east end zone and framed by a backdrop labeled Pride of Minnesota. About 20,000 seats have permanent chairbacks, located between the goal lines in both the upper and lower decks, but all remaining locations have aluminum bench seating with no backs. The stadium also features 1,000 handicap-accessible and companion seats, and accessible seating is located throughout the stadium, including in the first row of the first level, the last row of the first level, and the last row of the second level. Premium seating includes 37 private suites, 250 indoor club seats, 1,250 outdoor club seats, and 50 loge boxes, along with access to the exclusive 20,000-square-foot (1,900 m^{2}) climate-controlled DQ Club Room, which offers luxurious amenities to premium-seat ticket holders.

The main concourse on the second level wraps around the entire stadium and is open to the field of play. Concessions and many of the venue's 113 restrooms are located here.

Located in the southwest corner of the stadium is Goldy's Locker Room, the team store, which spans two floors. The T. Denny Sanford Athletics Hall of Fame was opened in fall of 2010, positioned in the southwest end of the stadium next to Goldy's Locker Room. The more than 5,000-square-foot (460 m^{2}) Hall of Fame is not football specific, rather encompassing all 25 of the University of Minnesota's athletic programs through dramatic imagery, artifacts, and interactive kiosks. Visitors to the Hall of Fame hear a soundscape with some of the great radio calls from Minnesota's play-by-play voices. The space also honors the members of the 'M' Club Hall of Fame with a wall complete with plaques for each inductee. The Hall of Fame housed the Floyd of Rosedale trophy after a win over Iowa in 2010.

The media area is a three-tiered press box with 10 network TV camera positions and seating for 160 members of the media.

=== Expansion ===
The stadium was designed to be capable of supporting future seating expansion to 80,000. The 30,000 seats would be added above the second deck of the stadium from the end of the press boxes across to the northwest end of the venue, wrapping around the remainder of the horseshoe. The auxiliary video display currently adjacent to the easternmost section of the media areas would likely be relocated to atop the new third deck. The University of Minnesota could add all 30,000 seats in a single addition or in increments of 10,000 seats, meeting demand as it is needed (although the duplicated costs of such a plan make it unlikely). If expansion is ever undertaken, it can be completed in about nine months so that there would be minimal interruption of a football season.

== 2014 changes ==
For the 2014 and 2015 seasons, the Minnesota Vikings of the National Football League (NFL) used TCF Bank Stadium as their home venue while their new venue, U.S. Bank Stadium, was under construction at the site of the Metrodome. To help accommodate the Vikings, TCF Bank Stadium underwent several changes, including a new playing surface with heating coils, increased storage space throughout the stadium, and concession upgrades. In addition, temporary seats were installed that increased the stadium's capacity to 52,525. These accommodations were expected to cost about $7 million - an amount attributed to the overall construction cost of the new stadium.

== Funding ==
The stadium cost $288.5 million, of which the university will pay 52% and the state of Minnesota the remaining 48%. Including interest, the state's cost was about $10 million per year or about $1.7 million per game for 25 years. About $50 million of the state's portion went to the purchase of 2,840 acres (11.5 km^{2}) of undeveloped university land, part of the Rosemount Research Center in Dakota County, over 25 years by the state of Minnesota, who will assume responsibility for risks if the site requires environmental cleanup. The university retains its right to use the land for its "research, education and engagement mission" in perpetuity.

The university's share was $111 million or 52%. TCF Financial Corporation of Wayzata is contributing $35 million over 25 years in exchange for the naming rights and other agreements. The university projected earnings of $2.5 million per year or $96 million over the life of agreements with TCF that will include marketing debit cards to alumni and ticketholders. If unable to fulfill its contractual obligations, TCF Financial Corporation must propose an alternate name subject to the approval of the university. Other corporate donations have been pledged as well, including Best Buy ($3 million), Dairy Queen ($2.5 million), Target Corporation ($2 million), Federated Insurance, General Mills, and Norwest Equity Partners.

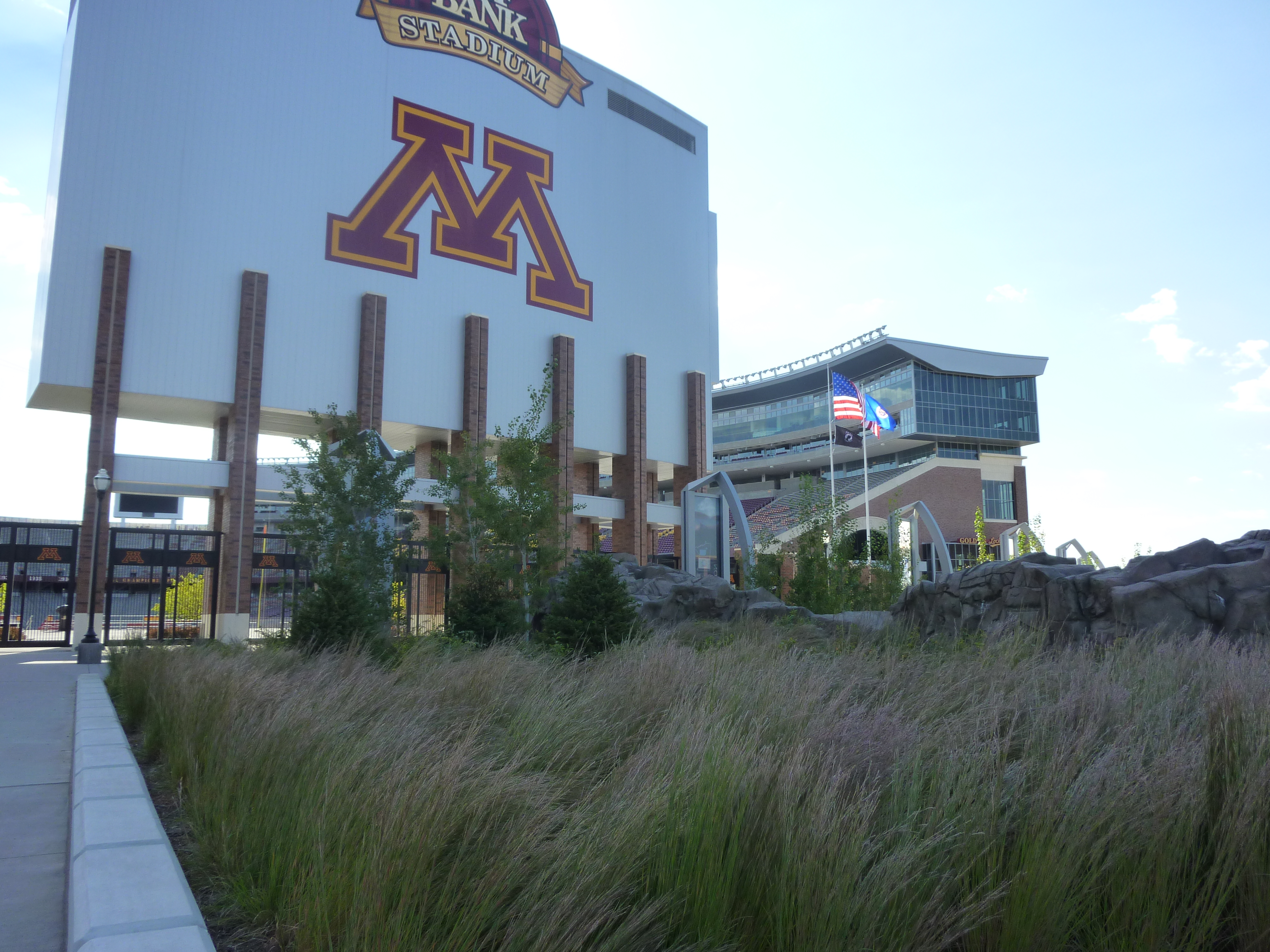
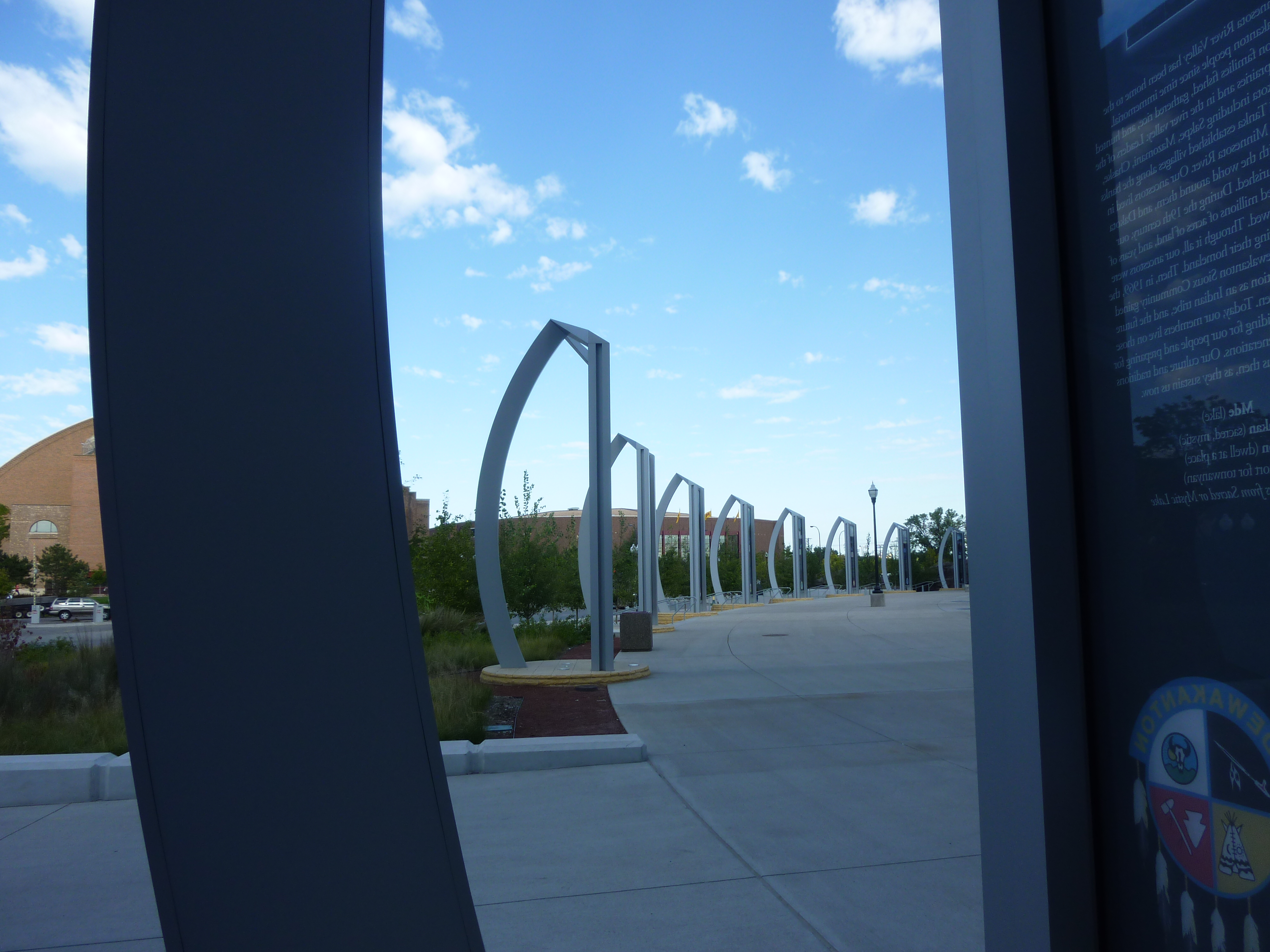
The Tribal Nations Plaza, named after the Shakopee Mdewakanton. Their donation of $14.5 million to the university was the largest gift in Gopher athletics history.

The university also accepted donations from individuals. Initially donations were only sought from "high-end" donors (those contributing $100,000 or more), but in June 2008 the university expanded the fundraising effort to gather smaller donations as well. On May 21, 2009, the university announced they had received a $6 million donation from T. Denny Sanford, meaning the university had achieved its goal of $86 million in private fund raising. The remainder of the university's portion came from a $12.50 per semester student fee ($25 per year) and game day parking revenue.

The cost of building TCF Bank Stadium was originally set at $248.7 million, but changes in the construction planning raised the cost to $288.5 million. The university vowed that even if the stadium cost rose again, it would not seek more money from the state nor increase the student fees any further.

The university still charges all U of M students a mandatory stadium fee of $6 every semester despite the stadium being finished.

=== Shakopee Mdewakanton Sioux donations ===
The Shakopee Mdewakanton Sioux Community (SMSC) agreed to donate $10 million for stadium construction, the largest gift Gopher athletics has ever received. The university matched an additional $2.5 million to create a $5 million endowment for scholarships for Native American and low-income students. The hospitality plaza on the stadium's west side and the scholarship were named to honor the community, and the plaza designed to "... celebrate the history, presence, and cultural contributions of all eleven Native American tribes in Minnesota". The university received an additional $2 million from the SMSC for construction of the plaza in 2009.

== Alcohol controversy ==
University president Robert Bruininks originally planned to have the school apply for a state liquor license in order to serve beer and wine in limited areas of the stadium. Under his proposal, alcohol would have been available only to occupants of premium season ticket seats ranging in price from $1,800 to $45,000 a year. This is/was consistent with the university's long-held alcohol policy at other on-campus athletic venues, such as Williams Arena and Mariucci Arena. This is also consistent with other NCAA institutions (including all other Big Ten Conference teams except for the University of Michigan and Ohio State University) with on-campus stadiums. At the time, no Big Ten stadiums served alcohol in their general seating.

In May 2009, the state legislature passed a law that states that no alcohol may be served or sold anywhere in the stadium, including in suites and premium boxes, unless all ticketholders 21 or older in the stadium can buy alcohol at a game. The University of Minnesota regents voted on June 24, 2009, on Bruininks' subsequent proposal to ban alcohol entirely at campus athletic events (and also ban it in Mariucci and Williams arenas), which passed 10–2.

In May 2010, the legislature passed a law saying that alcohol could be served in premium seating if it was also available in one-third of the general seats. Bruininks declined to ask the board of regents to make this compromise. Dan Wolter, a spokesman for the university, said, "We recognize and understand that underage drinking is a big problem in our society as a whole so that is a stand that the University wanted to take."

On July 11, 2012, the university regents voted to allow beer sales at the stadium starting in the fall of 2012.

== Attendance ==
=== Gophers football ===
Year	Total	Games	Average	Season highest
2009	355,635	7	50,805	All sellouts (50,805)
2010	346,593	7	49,913	Iowa (50,805)
2011	333,996	7	47,714	Miami (OH) (49,950)
2012	326,456	7	46,637	Syracuse (50,805)
2013	334,581	7	47,797	Wisconsin (53,090)
2014	335,056	7	47,865	Purdue (51,241)
2015	366,564	7	52,366	TCU (54,147)
2016	306,697	7	43,814	Iowa (49,145)
2017	310,506	7	44,358	Michigan State (47,541)
2018	265,407	7	37,915	Iowa (48,199)
2019	323,330	7	46,190	Wisconsin (53,756)
2020	1,953	3	651	Iowa (771)
2021	322,978	7	46,139	Ohio State (50,805)
2022	315,130	7	45,019	Rutgers (49,368)
2023	339,169	7	48,453	Nebraska (53,629)
2024	332,228	7	47,461	Iowa (52,048)
2025	325,635	7	46,489	Purdue (49,254)

=== Vikings ===
Year	Total	Games	Average	Season highest
2010	40,504	1	40,504	Chicago (40,504)
2014	417,906	8	52,238	Green Bay (52,386)
2015	471,530	9	52,430	Green Bay (52,529)

=== Minnesota United ===
Year	Total	Games	Average	Season highest
2017	349,138	17	20,538	Atlanta United FC (35,043)
2018	406,342	17	23,902	Los Angeles Galaxy (52,242)

== Other uses ==
=== Marching band/drum & bugle corps ===
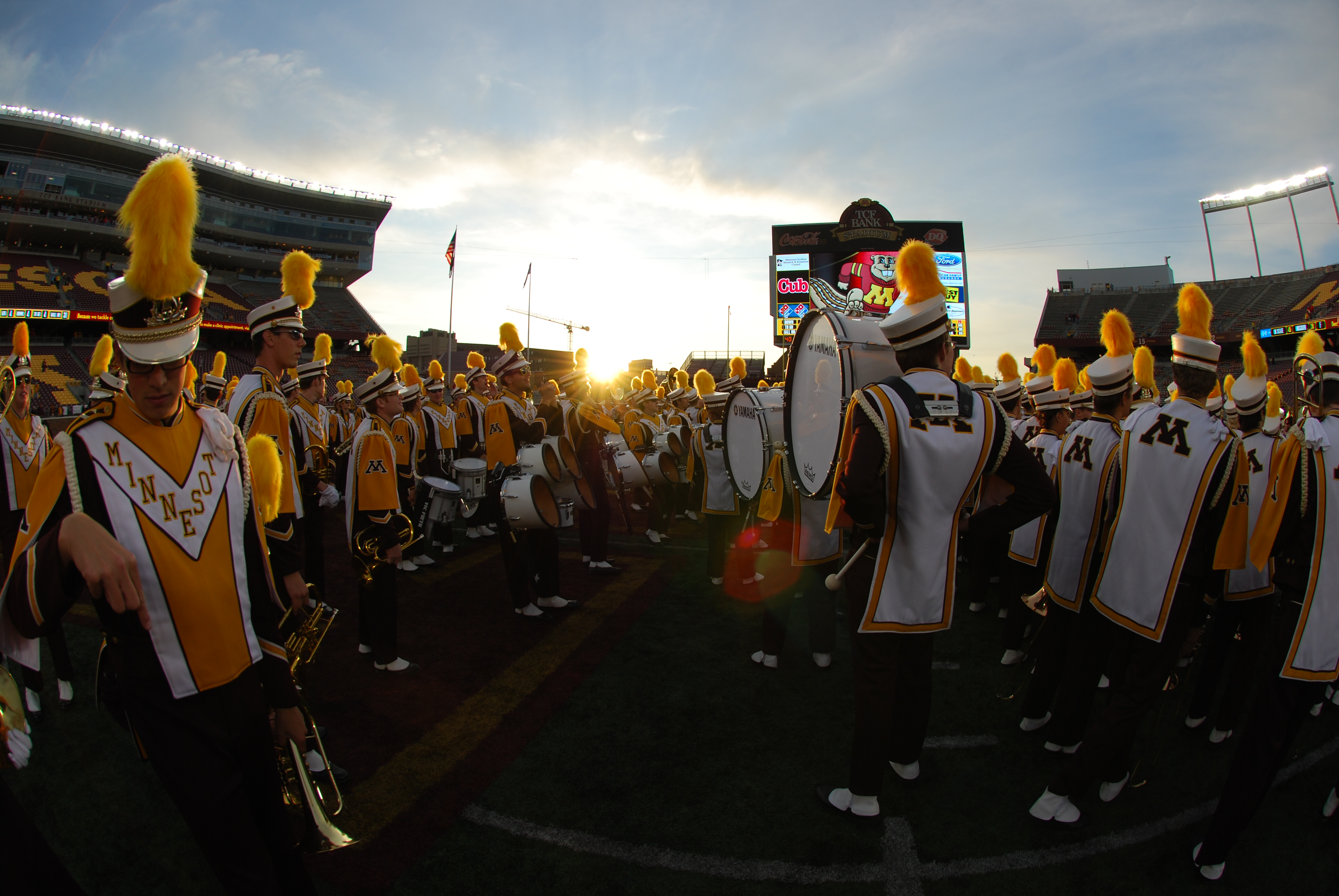
Pride of Minnesota

The stadium replaced Northrop Auditorium as the home of the University of Minnesota Marching Band, providing it with direct access to the stadium field and new storage, rehearsal, locker room, and office facilities. The stadium has been host to the DCI Minnesota Drum & Bugle Corps competition sponsored by Drum Corps International and hosted by Minnesota Brass. The first competition, held on July 18, 2010, was cancelled during the show due to the touchdown of a nearby tornado. In 2011, the competition was won by the Cavaliers, and in 2012 was won by the Blue Devils. The stadium is currently home to the Drum Corps International Minnesota event, taking place in mid-July each year since 2010.

=== Other university activities ===
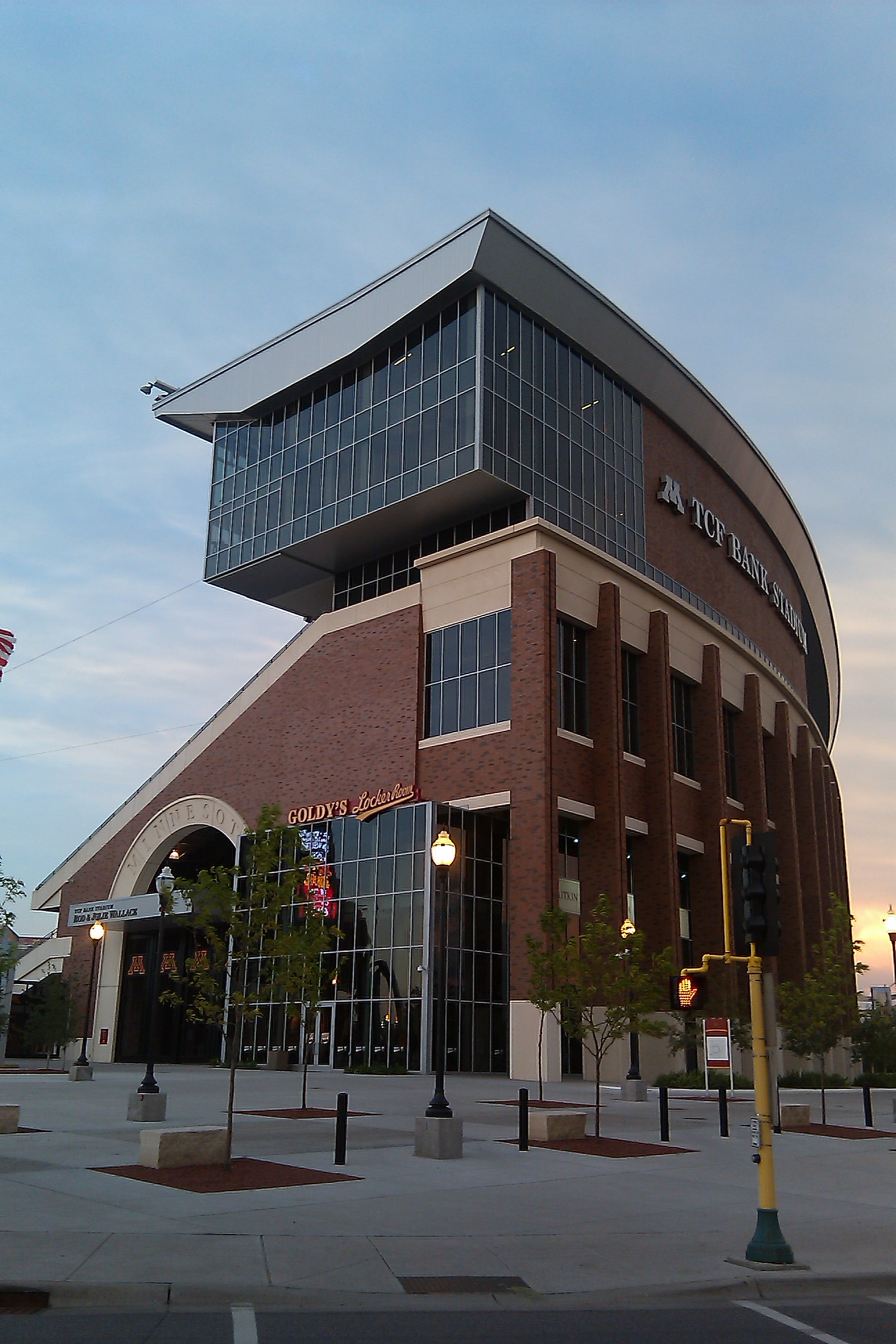
South Wing of the Stadium featuring Goldy's Lockerroom

The university also utilizes the stadium for intramural sports, career fairs, graduation ceremonies, and other special events.

=== Concerts ===
Date	Artist	Opening act(s)	Tour / concert name	Attendance	Revenue	Notes
July 23, 2011	U2	Interpol	U2 360° Tour	59,843 / 59,843	$5,163,440	The stadium's first concert was originally scheduled for June 27, 2010. However, it was postponed after U2 frontman Bono underwent emergency back surgery, and was rescheduled for July 23, 2011 after having been pushed back an additional week by the 2011 Drum Corps International Minnesota event.
September 27, 2013	Passion Pit	Hoodie Allen; Marc E. Bassy	—	—	—	U of Minnesota homecoming festivities
July 12, 2014	Imagine Dragons	Atmosphere	—	—	—	This concert was part of the 2014 Major League Baseball All-Star game activities.
October 17, 2014	Iggy Azalea	Walk the Moon	The New Classic Tour	—	—	U of Minnesota homecoming festivities
June 3, 2015	Rolling Stones	Grace Potter	Zip Code Tour	41,517 / 41,517	$8,328,199	
June 20, 2015	Luke Bryan	Florida Georgia Line; Randy Houser; Thomas Rhett; Dustin Lynch; DJ Rock	Kick The Dust Up Tour	41,290 / 41, 290	$3,593,389	
July 26, 2015	One Direction	Icona Pop	On the Road Again Tour	38,323 / 38,323	$3,064,677	
May 23, 2016	Beyoncé	DJ Drama	The Formation World Tour	37,203 / 37,203	$4,174,270	First female artist to headline a stadium show in the Twin Cities area. Wiz Khalifa and Jeremih joined DJ Drama during the opening act. After the opening act had finished, the stadium was evacuated due to nearby lightning strikes. The show was postponed for 45 minutes.
October 21, 2016	Kesha	—	Kesha and the Creepies: Fuck the World Tour	—	—	
July 20, 2023	Beyoncé		Renaissance World Tour	39,415 / 39,415	$8,217,178	The highest grossing show by a soloist at the venue.

=== High school athletics ===
Minnesota State High School League state football and soccer tournaments, concerts, and marching band competitions have all been considered. The Minnesota State High School League's football championship games were played at the stadium in 2014 and 2015.

=== Soccer ===
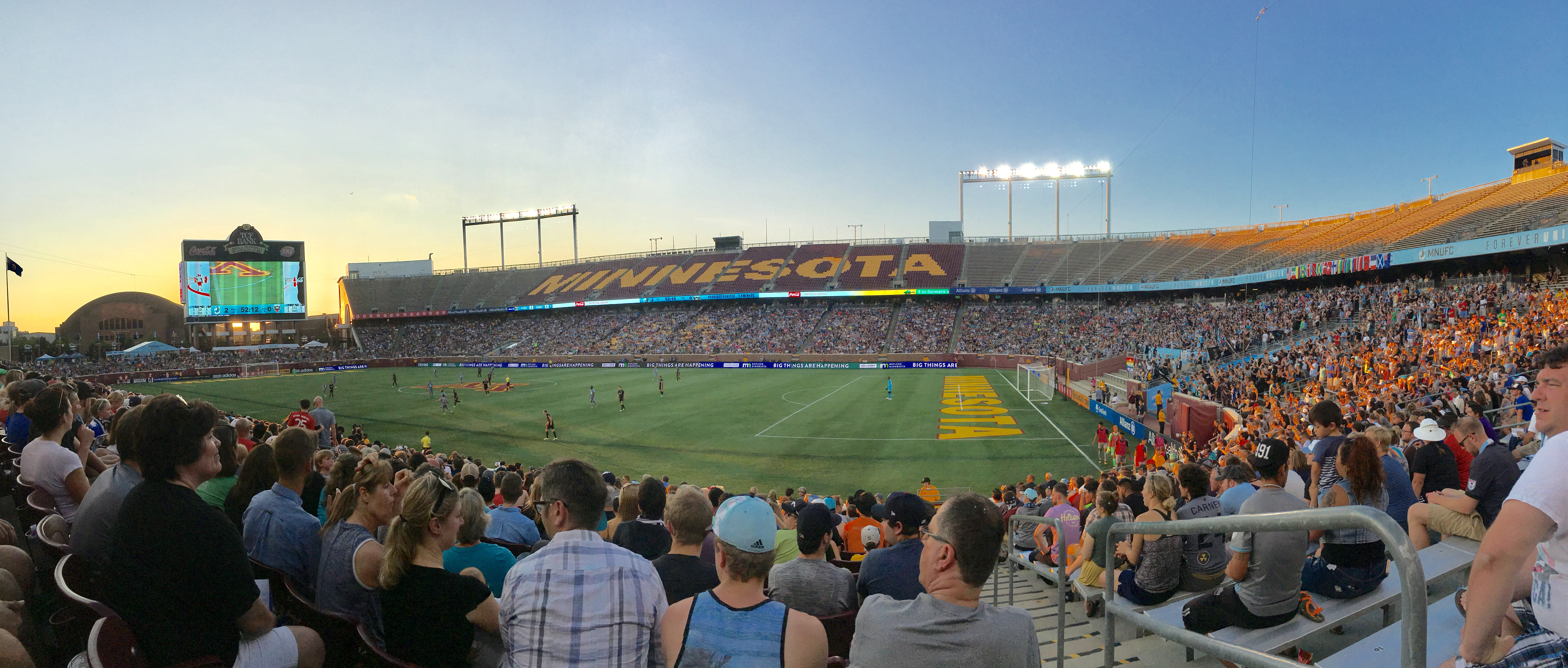
Minnesota United FC playing at Huntington Bank Stadium, known at the time as TCF Bank Stadium

TCF Bank Stadium was evaluated as a potential venue for a bid by the United States to host the 2018 or 2022 FIFA World Cup. In addition, TCF Bank Stadium was planned as a preliminary soccer venue in the Chicago bid for the 2016 Summer Olympics. On August 2, 2014, TCF Bank Stadium hosted a group B match as part of the International Champions Cup between Manchester City FC and Olympiacos. The Ottawa Fury also played Minnesota United FC as part of a double-header. A temporary grass field was laid over the artificial surface for the games. The field was 120 yards by 68 yards. The University of Minnesota women's soccer team continues to play at Elizabeth Lyle Robbie Stadium.

For Minnesota United FC's first two seasons in Major League Soccer, the club played their home matches at TCF Bank Stadium as they awaited the opening of Allianz Field in St. Paul. The field for Minnesota United FC games are on 120 yd × 70 yd (110 m × 64 m). Per a $1 million agreement with the university, Minnesota United was forced to schedule its matches on separate weekends and not play on weekdays during the school's spring and fall semesters. The club also painted over the permanent markings in the end zones and at midfield for some matches. The provision was influenced by the temporary hosting of the Vikings, which used a labor-intensive process to change out the markings that left the field in worse condition for the Gophers.

==== International soccer matches ====
Date	Winning team	Result	Losing team	Tournament	Spectators
August 2, 2014	(Greece) Olympiacos	2–2	(England) Manchester City FC	2014 International Champions Cup	34,047

=== Minnesota Vikings ===
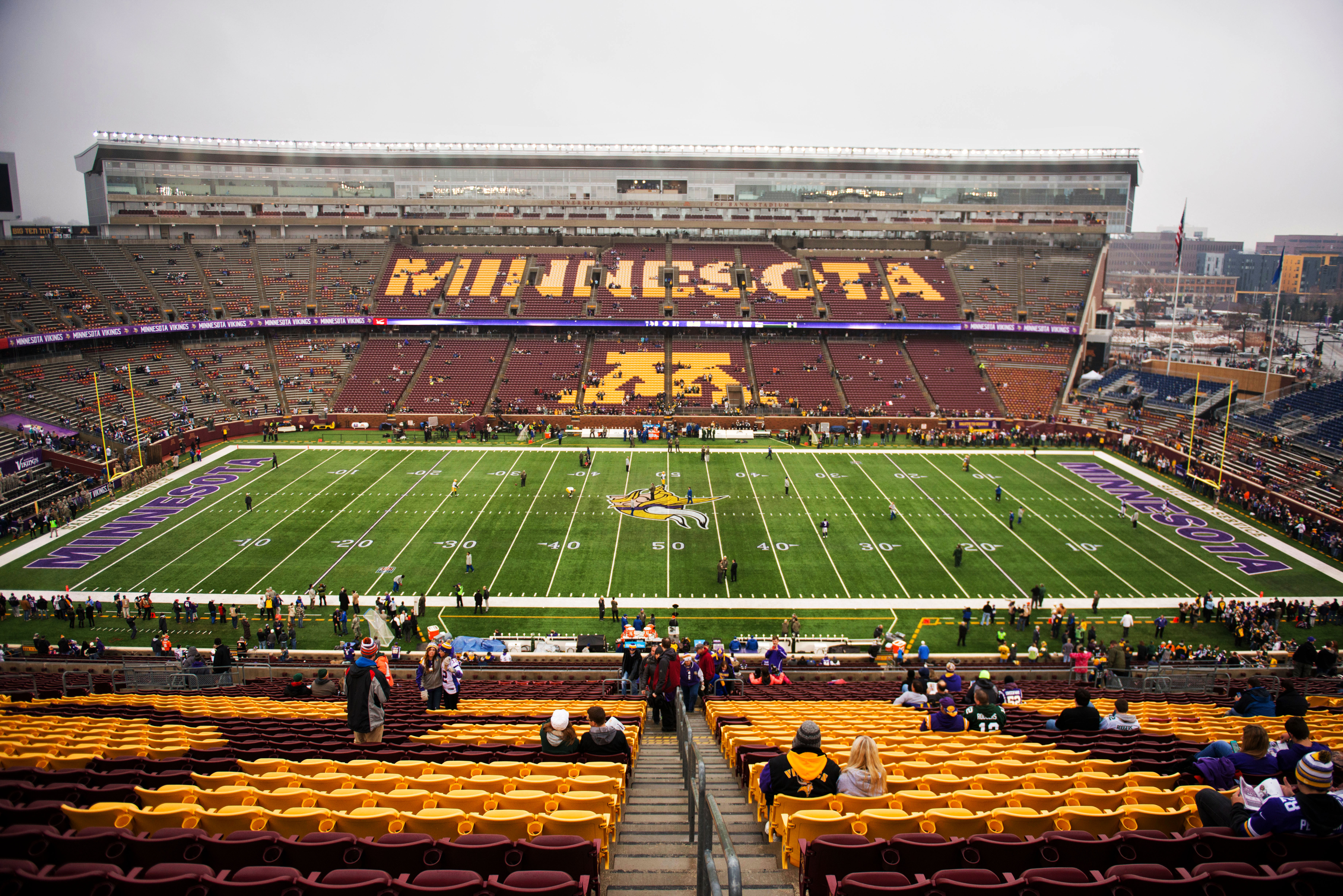
Minnesota Vikings colors on Huntington Bank Stadium's field

Due to a collapse of the Metrodome's roof, the Minnesota Vikings' Monday Night Football game against the Chicago Bears was held at the stadium on December 20, 2010, which was the Vikings' first outdoor home game since exactly 29 years before, when Metropolitan Stadium was closed. The game ended with the Bears defeating the Vikings, 40−14. With the win, the Bears won the NFC North title and Devin Hester broke the kickoff return for touchdown record. This was Brett Favre's last game in the NFL after he sustained a concussion from being hit by Corey Wootton.

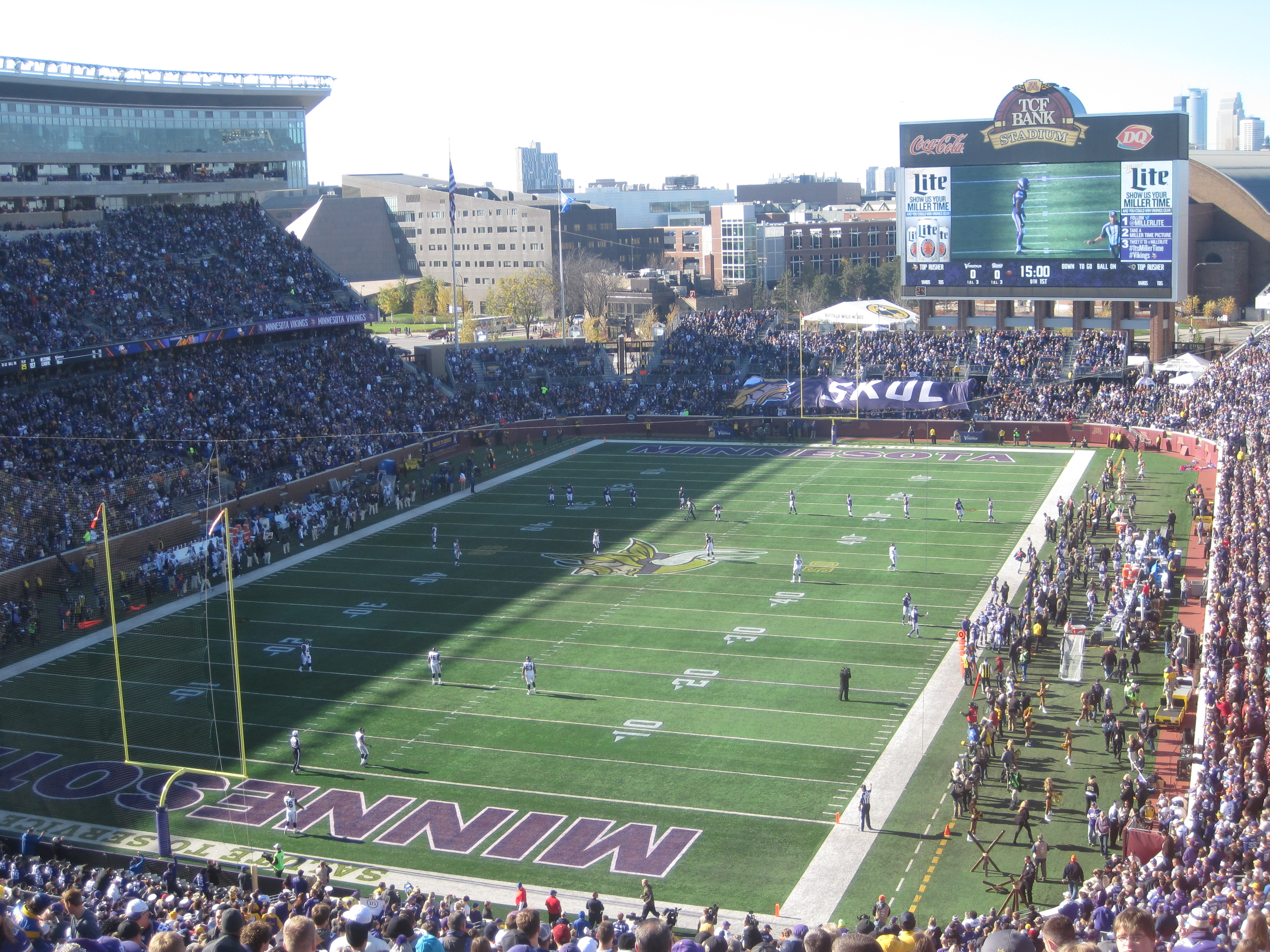
The Vikings hosting a game at Huntington Bank Stadium (known at the time as TCF Bank Stadium) against the Rams on November 8, 2015

The Vikings played the 2014 and 2015 NFL seasons at the stadium during construction of U.S. Bank Stadium, which included the demolition of the Metrodome. TCF Bank Stadium was the smallest stadium in the NFL by seat capacity for those two seasons. The Vikings reportedly paid $2 million for upkeep costs for those seasons. The Vikings also spent $4.5 million to upgrade the facilities to NFL standards, mainly to include heating coils under the turf. The Vikings used the north sideline (opposite the press box) in 2014–15. In early 2016, the Vikings became the first team in NFL history to qualify for and host the playoffs while based in a temporary stadium. In addition, the game also set a Vikings team record for the coldest home game, as well as the third coldest in NFL history at −6 °F (−21 °C) and windchill of −25 °F (−32 °C).

=== Ice hockey ===
The stadium hosted an outdoor NCAA ice hockey game between the Minnesota Golden Gophers and Ohio State Buckeyes on January 17, 2014. The Gophers won 1–0 with 45,021 fans in attendance. It also hosted its first NHL contest on February 21, 2016, between the Minnesota Wild and the Chicago Blackhawks as part of the 2016 NHL Stadium Series. The Wild won 6–1 in front of 50,426 fans.

== See also ==
- List of NCAA Division I FBS football stadiums

== Notes and references ==
Events and tenants
Preceded by Hubert H. Humphrey Metrodome	Home of the Minnesota Golden Gophers; 2009–present	Succeeded by Current Stadium
Preceded by Hubert H. Humphrey Metrodome	Home of the Minnesota Vikings; 2014–2015	Succeeded by U.S. Bank Stadium
Preceded by First Stadium	Home of the Minnesota United FC; 2017–2018	Succeeded by Allianz Field
