= TCF Financial Corporation =

Former American financial services company

- Formerly: Chemical State Savings Bank (1917–1964); Chemical Bank and Trust Company (1964–1974); Chemical Bank (1974–2019)
- Industry: Bank
- Founded: 1917; 109 years ago (as Chemical State Savings Bank); August 1, 2019; 7 years ago (as TCF Bank)
- Defunct: June 9, 2021; 5 years ago
- Fate: Acquired by Huntington Bancshares
- Successor: Huntington Bancshares
- Headquarters: Midland, Michigan (1917–2018); Detroit, Michigan (2018–2021)
- Number of locations: 506 branches (2021)
- Area served: Midwest and Mountain West
- Key people: Gary Torgow (Executive Chairman); Craig R. Dahl (President and CEO)
- Revenue: ▲US$2.1 billion (2019)
- Net income: ▼US$294.5 million (2019)
- Total assets: ▲US$47.802 billion (2020)
- Total equity: ▼US$5.689 billion (2020)
- Number of employees: 7,123 (2020)

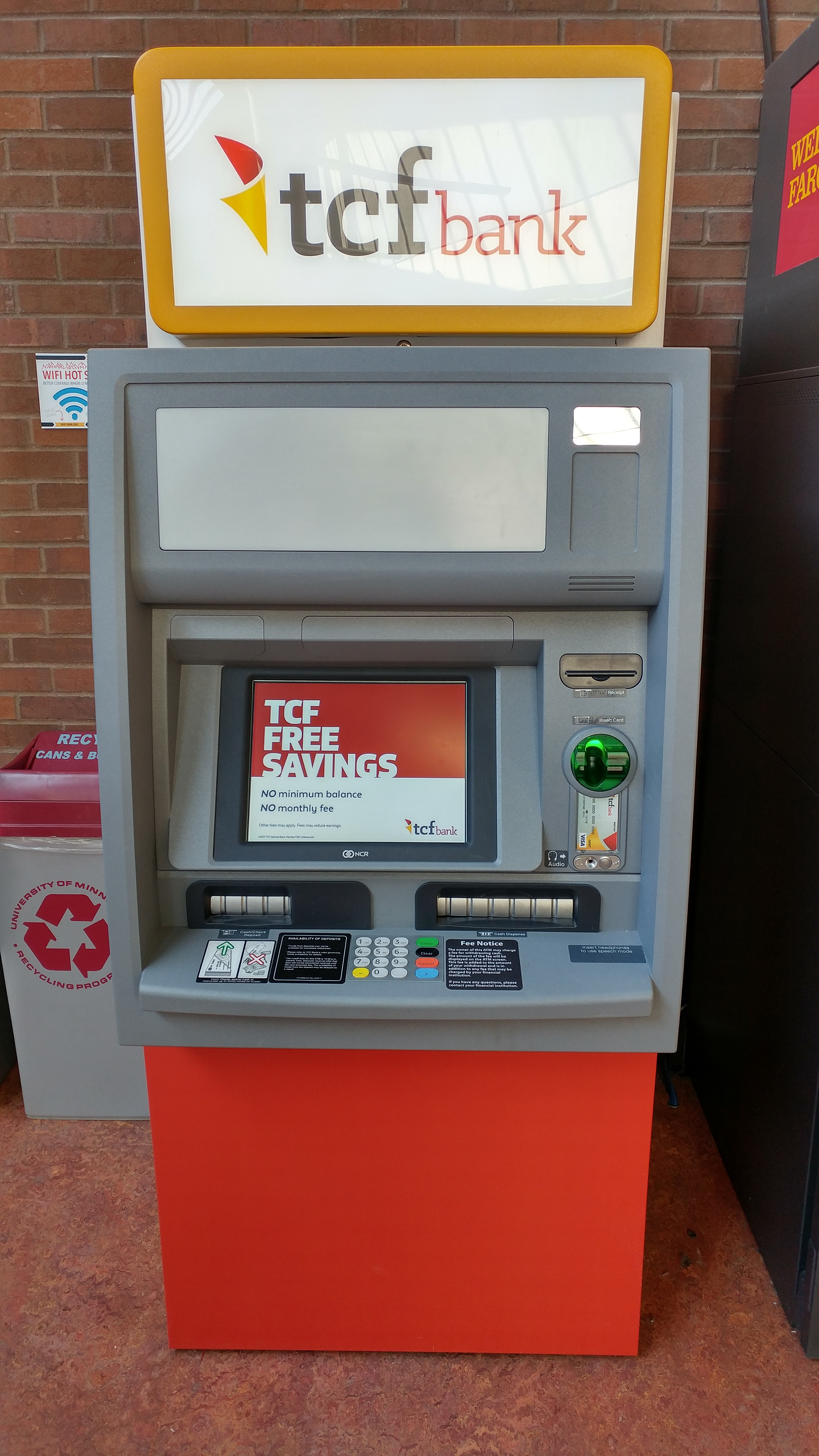
TCF Bank ATM at the University of Minnesota

TCF Financial Corporation, an acronym for Twin City Federal, was a bank holding company based in Detroit, Michigan. Its operating subsidiary, TCF Bank, operated 478 branches in Minnesota, Illinois, Michigan, Colorado, Wisconsin, Ohio, and South Dakota. It also operated specialty lending and leasing businesses in all 50 states, Canada, New Zealand, and Australia. TCF was acquired by Huntington Bancshares in June 2021.

== History ==
Chemical State Savings Bank was founded in 1917.

In 1937, the headquarters of Chemical Bank was the site of the infamous bank robbery by Tony Chebatoris, which resulted in Chebatoris being the only man to receive the death penalty in the state of Michigan.

In 1964, the bank changed its name to Chemical Bank Trust.

In 1974, the bank changed its name to Chemical Bank.

In May 2010, the bank acquired O.A.K. Financial Corporation.

In October 2014, the bank acquired Northwestern Bank for $121 million in cash.

In April 2015, the bank acquired Monarch Community Bancorp for $27.2 million in stock.

In June 2015, the bank acquired Lake Michigan Financial Corporation for $187.4 million in cash and stock.

In August 2016, the bank acquired Talmer Bancorp for $1.7 billion in cash and stock.

In 2017, David B. Ramaker, president and chief executive officer of the bank, retired and was succeeded by David T. Provost.

On July 25, 2018, the company announced the move of its headquarters, along with over 500 employees, to Detroit.

In 2019, the company merged with TCF Financial Corporation, the third-largest bank in Minneapolis–Saint Paul and assumed the TCF Financial Corporation name.

In 2020, TCF sold all 7 of its branches in Arizona to Global Credit Union.

TCF was acquired by Huntington Bancshares in June 2021, and sold 13 branches in Michigan to Horizon Bank to gain regulatory approval for the merger.

== Controversies ==
=== Racial discrimination lawsuit ===
On January 21, 2020, an assistant manager at a TCF branch on Middlebelt Road in Livonia, Michigan, called police when Sauntore Thomas, an African-American account holder, attempted to deposit checks received as a settlement in a racial discrimination lawsuit. The branch manager was unable to validate the checks and claimed they were fraudulent. TCF also filed a police report for fraud against the customer despite verification from his attorney that the checks were genuine. Thomas filed a suit on January 22, 2020, seeking unspecified damages from the bank. On January 23, 2020, TCF issued an apology stating that local police should not have been involved; explaining that they take extra precautions involving large deposits and requests for cash.

== Sponsorship ==
TCF was the naming rights sponsor of the stadium at the University of Minnesota, now called Huntington Bank Stadium.

In February 2019, Chemical Financial acquired the naming rights to Cobo Center, which was renamed TCF Center in August 2019 and Huntington Place upon the merger with Huntington Bank.
