= Talmer Bancorp =

Former bank holding company

Talmer Bancorp was a bank holding company headquartered in Troy, Michigan. It was the parent company of Talmer Bank & Trust and operated banks in Michigan, Illinois, Indiana, and Ohio. In 2016, it was acquired by Chemical Financial (now TCF Financial Corporation).

== History ==
The company was founded in 2007 as First Michigan Bank.

First Michigan changed its name to Talmer in 2011 after acquiring banks outside of Michigan.

In 2013, Talmer acquired First Place Bank based in Warren, Ohio.

In 2014, it sold its Wisconsin branches to Hartland, Wisconsin-based Town Bank.

In 2015, Talmer acquired First Huron Corp and its subsidiary Signature Bank.

In 2016, the bank was acquired by Chemical Financial (now TCF Financial Corporation).
