= David Myers =

David or Dave Myers may refer to:

== Politics and government ==
- David Myers (Indiana judge) (1859–1955), Associate Justice of the Indiana Supreme Court
- David Myers (Oklahoma politician) (1938–2011), American politician, member of the Oklahoma Senate
- David Myers (Mississippi politician) (born 1961), American politician, member of the Mississippi House of Representatives
- David Myers (police officer) (fl. 1980s–2010s), commander in the San Diego County Sheriff's Department

== Sports ==
- Dave Myers (American football) (1906–1997), American football player for Staten Island Stapletons and Brooklyn Dodges
- Dave Myers (baseball) (born 1959), American baseball coach
- David Myers (rugby league) (1971–2008), English rugby league footballer
- David Myers (Australian footballer) (born 1989), Australian rules footballer

== Others ==
- David Myers (cinematographer) (1914–2004), American photographer and cinematographer
- Dave Myers (fl. 1950s–1980s), bass player for American band The Aces
- David Myers (songwriter), English songwriter active in the 1970s and 1980s
- David Myers (psychologist) (born 1942), American psychologist
- D. G. Myers (literary critic) (David G. Myers, 1952–2024), American literary critic
- Dave Myers (presenter) (1957–2024), British presenter of cookery programmes, one of the Hairy Bikers
- David N. Myers (born 1960), American historian
- David Myers (American chef) (fl. 2000s–2010s), American chef and restaurateur

== See also ==
- David Meyers (disambiguation)
- David Meyer (disambiguation)
