= David May =

David May may refer to:

- David May (merchant) (1848–1927), American businessman
- David May (journalist) (1948–2019), English investigative journalist and editor
- David May (computer scientist) (born 1951), British computer scientist
- David May (footballer) (born 1970), English footballer
- Dave May (1943–2012), baseball player
- David N. May, (born 1971), American judge
- David W. May, American general

== See also ==
- David Mays (disambiguation)
- David Mayer (disambiguation)
- David Meyer (disambiguation)
