= David Mair =

David Mair may refer to:

- David Mair (artificial track luger) (born 1984), Italian artificial track luger
- David Mair (natural track luger and skeleton racer) (born 1980), Italian natural track luger and skeleton racer
- Dave Mair, 1973 CFL draft

== See also ==
- David Mayer (disambiguation)
- David Meyer (disambiguation)
