= Aerial Support to Regional Enforcement Agencies =

Coordinates: 32°49′7.65″N 116°58′26.23″W

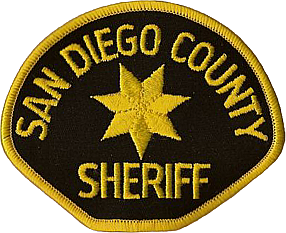
- Patch of the San Diego County Sheriff's Department

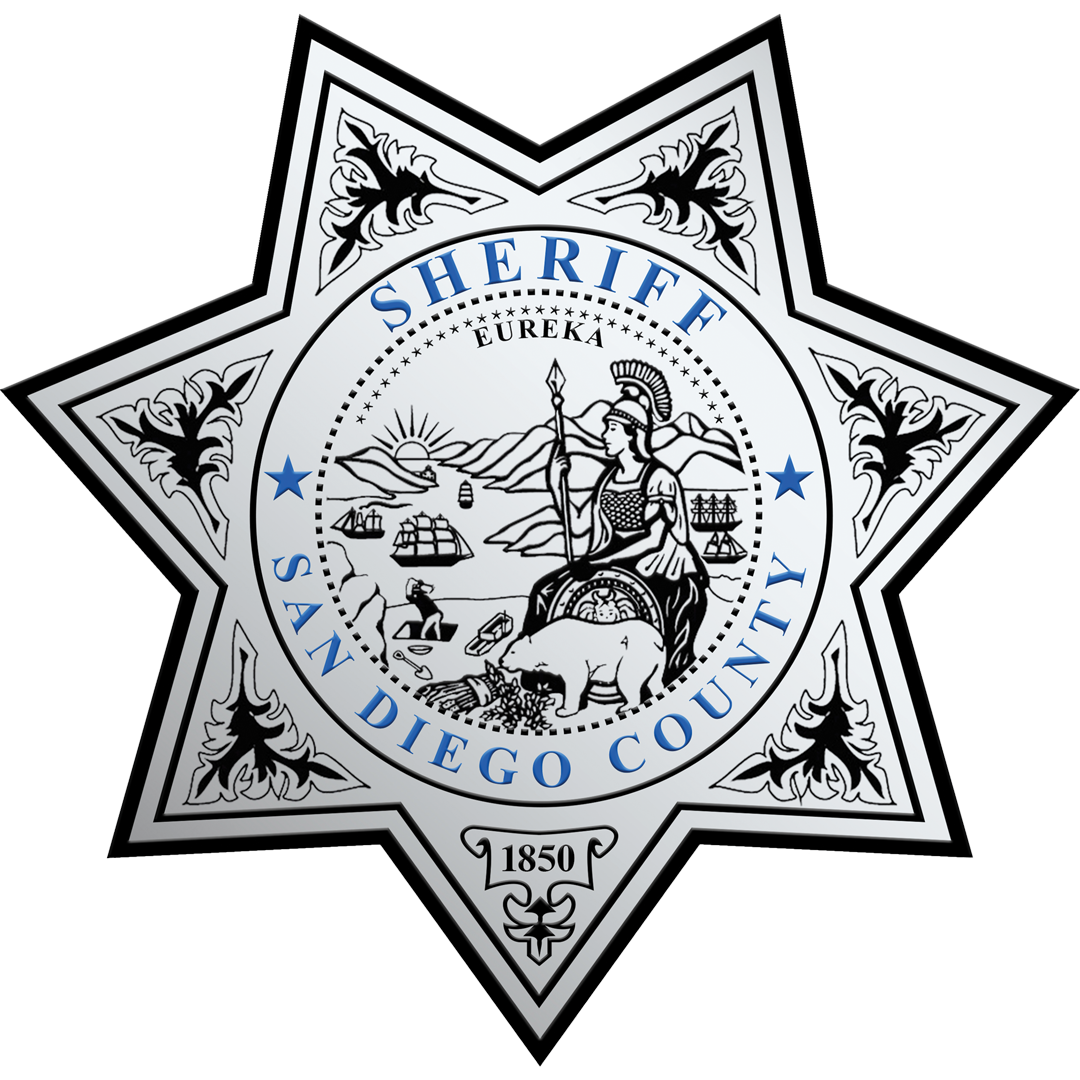
- Badge

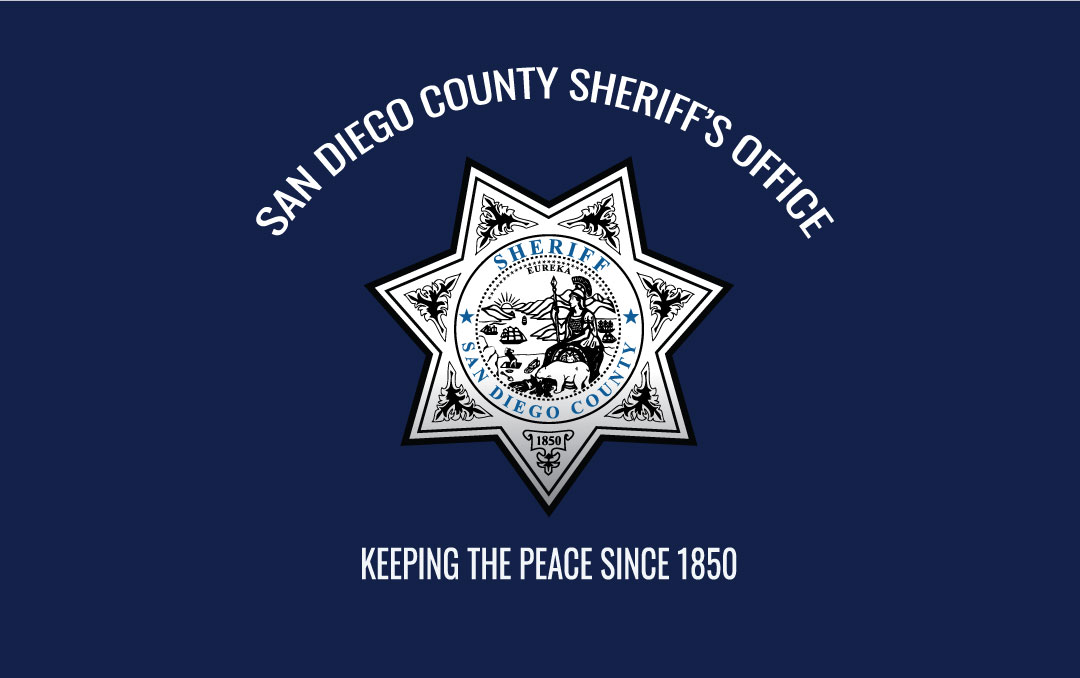
- Flag
- Abbreviation: ASTREA

Agency overview
- Formed: 1972

Jurisdictional structure
- Operations jurisdiction: California, State, US
- Governing body: San Diego County Sheriff's Department

Operational structure
- Headquarters: Gillespie Field, El Cajon, California
- Parent agency: San Diego County Sheriff's Department
- Aviation units: ASTREA

Facilities
- Airbases: Gillespie Field
- Helicopters: 8: Bell 407GXi (4); Bell 205A-1++ (3); Bell 412EPX (1)

Website
- www.sdsheriff.gov

Aerial Support to Regional Enforcement Agencies (ASTREA) is the aviation unit of the San Diego County Sheriff's Office. It is based at Gillespie Field in El Cajon, California.

== History ==
1972 - ASTREA began operations with three Korean War-era Bell 47G helicopters based at Gillespie Field in El Cajon.

1997 - On February 16, Deputy Patrick "Pat" S. Coyle, 42, died after the ASTREA helicopter in which he and pilot Ron Hobson were flying crashed in Sycamore Canyon, northeast of Santee, California. His death marked the first fatality in the then 25-year history of the sheriff's air support unit.

2003 - Cedar Fire and Paradise Fire

2005 - ASTREA receives two refurbished Bell 205A-1++ "Super Huey" firefighting helicopters. These are the first two aircraft purchased for the new regional fire helicopter program the county started after the October 2003 wildfires. Both are single-engine, medium-lift copters equipped with 375 gallon underbelly water tanks. The helicopters arrived at Gillespie Field after a three-day, 2,000-mile flight from Eagle Copters of Calgary, Canada. They are designated Copter 10 and 12.

2008 - A new Bell 407 is acquired and equipped to support law enforcement and command and control missions.

2009 - ASTREA sells two of its Hughes 500Ds. (ASTREA 2 & 4) These will eventually be replaced with MD530Fs.

2010 - The only MD500E owned by ASTREA is converted to an MD530F, which is better suited for high altitude and hot weather operations.

2015 - ASTREA adds a Bell 407GX to the fleet (N972PC). On September 29, ASTREA receives a third Bell 205A-1. Like the first two, Copter 11 was rebuilt by Eagle Copters and flown from Calgary to El Cajon.

2019 - The first two of four Bell 407GXi were delivered.

2020 - The third Bell 407GXi were delivered. (N709WG) The WG registration letters are the initials of the former Sheriff William Gore.

2023 - The last Bell 407GXi joined the fleet, and the first of two Bell/Subaru 412EPX arrived. N972PC a Bell 407GX was sold to make way for the new GXi.

== Aircraft ==
As of November 2023, ASTREA's fleet consists of 8 helicopters:

Role	Make/Model (Qty)	Unit No.	Tail No.	MFG Year	Serial No. (C/N)
Law Enforcement*	Bell 407GXi (4)	ASTREA 1	N319MW	2019	54814
Law Enforcement*	Bell 407GXi (4)	ASTREA 3	N313DP	2019	54880
Law Enforcement*	Bell 407GXi (4)	None	N709WG	2020	54885
Law Enforcement*	Bell 407GXi (4)	ASTREA 2	N670PC	2023	56345
Firefighting/Rescue	Bell 205A-1++ (3)	ASTREA 10	N449RC	1973	30121
Firefighting/Rescue	Bell 205A-1++ (3)	ASTREA 14	N549RL	1975	30215
Firefighting/Rescue	Bell 205A-1++ (3)	ASTREA 12	N107BZ	1968	30013
Firefighting/Rescue	Bell 412EPX (1)	ASTREA 11	N989RL	2023	39110

The 407 models can be equipped with a Bambi Bucket for use in firefighting, while the Bell 205s and 412 have 375 gallon belly tanks already installed.

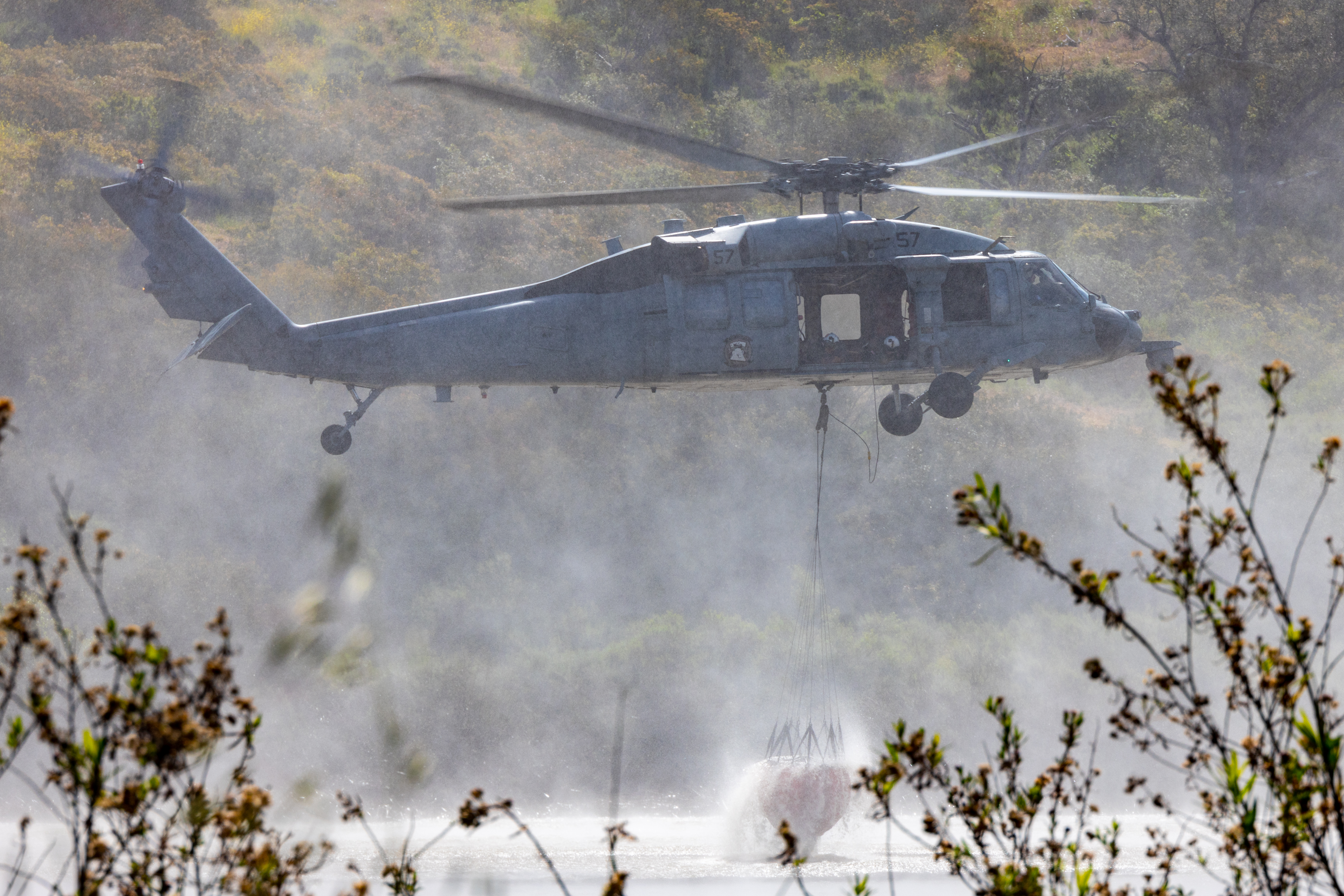
A U.S. Navy SH-60 Sea Hawk helicopter fills a bambi bucket with water during the annual Cory Iverson Wildland Firefighting exercise at the Las Pulgas Lake on Marine Corps Base Camp Pendleton, California, April 19, 2023.

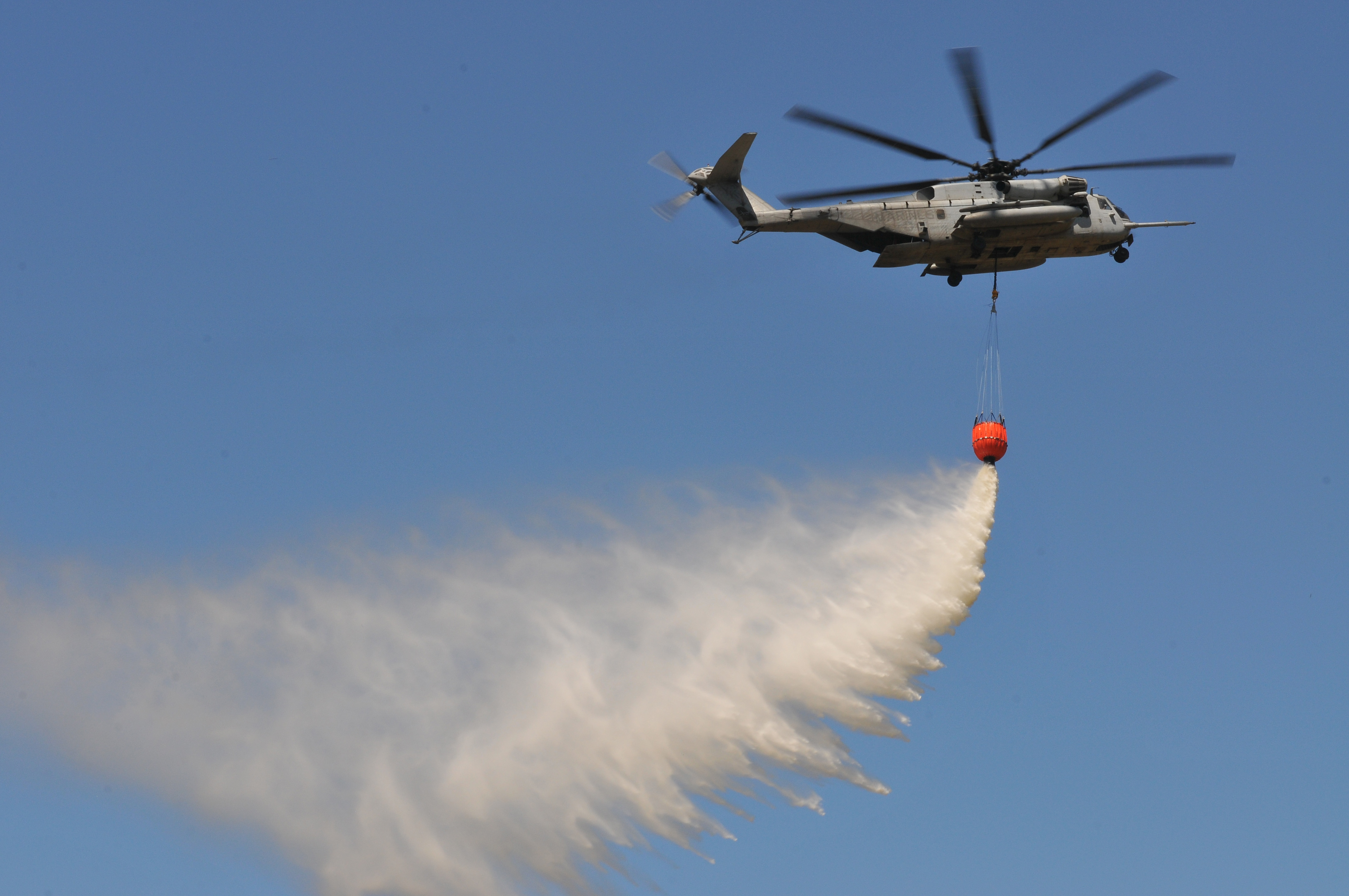
A CH-46E Sea Knight helicopter assigned to Marine Medium Helicopter Squadron 364 drops water during an annual firefighting exercise. The exercise involved Navy, Marine Corps, San Diego County Sheriff's Department and the California Department of Forestry and Fire Protection.
