= Dave Meyers =

David Meyers may refer to:

- Dave Meyers (director) (born 1972), American music video director
- Dave Meyers (basketball) (1953–2015), American basketball player

== See also ==
- David Myers (disambiguation)
- David Meyer (disambiguation)
