= San Diego County Sheriff's Office =

Law enforcement agency in California, United States

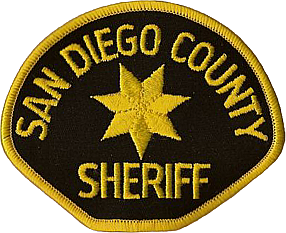
- Patch

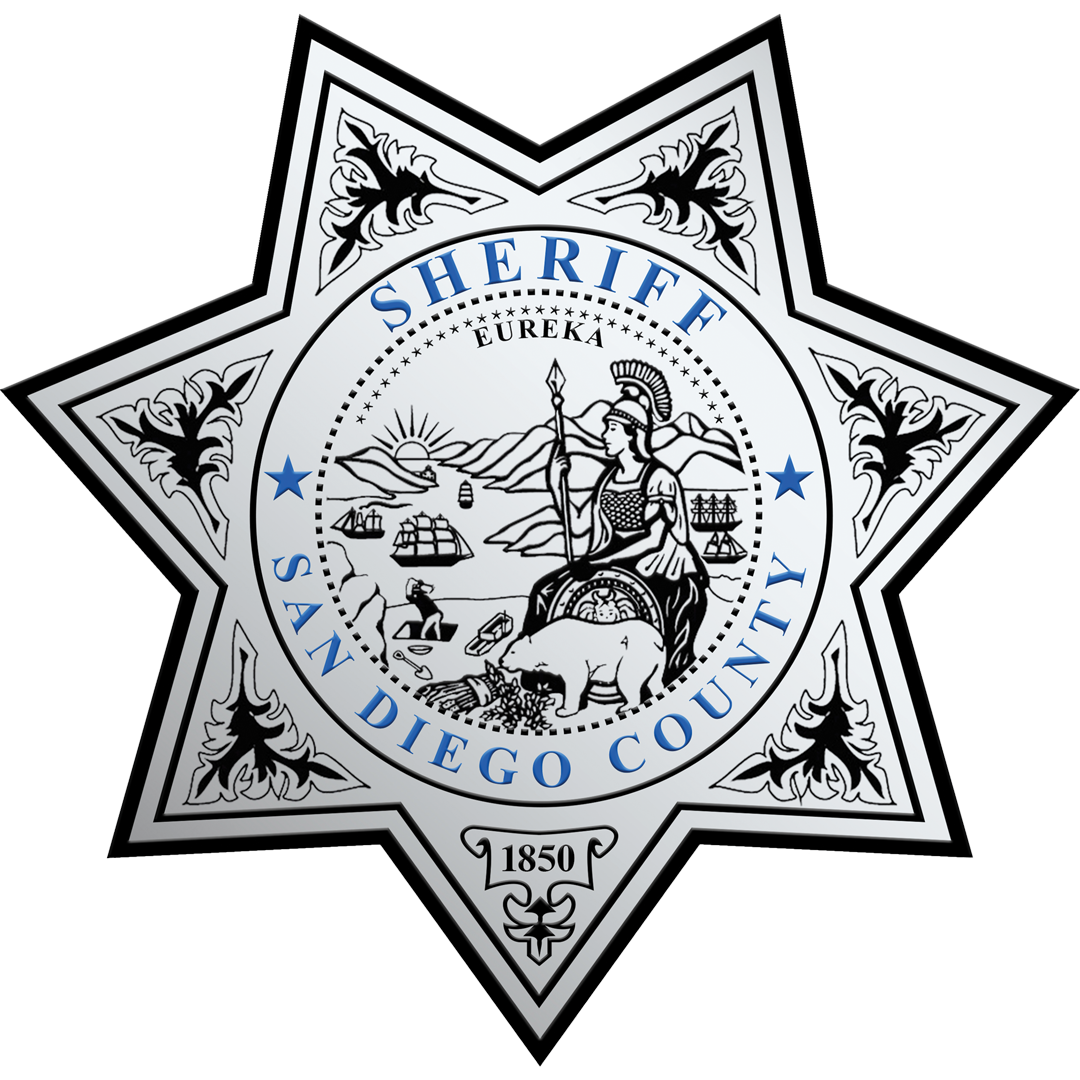
- Badge

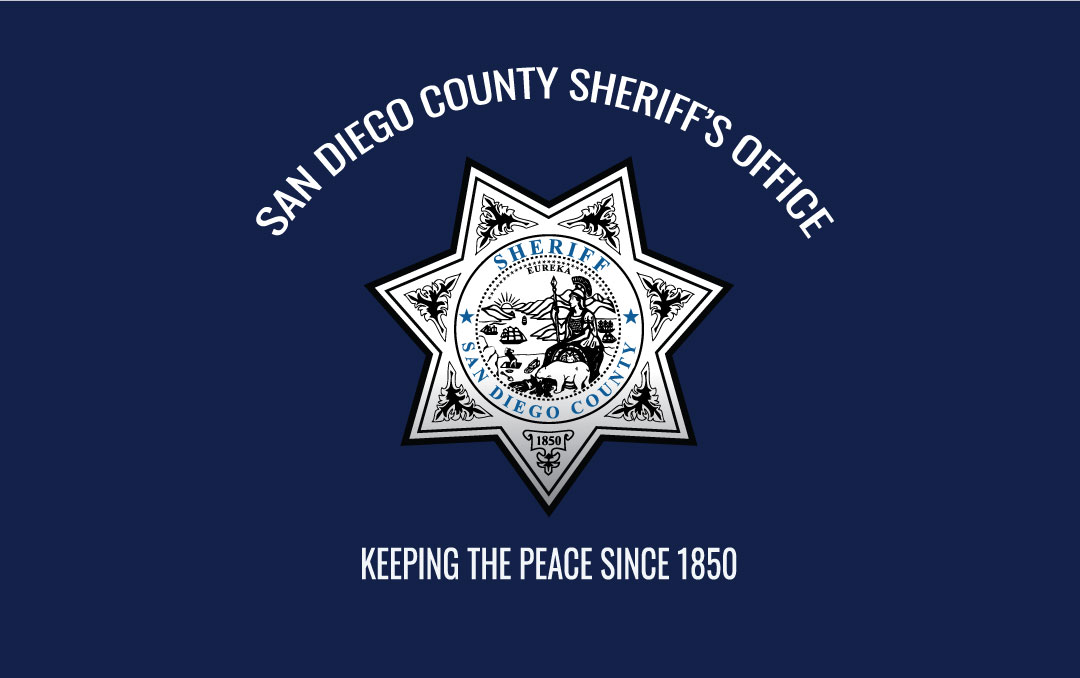
- Flag
- Abbreviation: SDSO

Agency overview
- Formed: 1850; 176 years ago
- Employees: 4,000+ (2024)
- Annual budget: US $1,374,767,820 (2024)

Jurisdictional structure
- Operations jurisdiction: San Diego County, California, United States
- San Diego County Sheriff's Office's jurisdiction.
- Area: 4,200 square miles (10,900 km^{2})
- Population: 2,974,859
- General nature: Local civilian police

Operational structure
- Headquarters: 9621 Ridgehaven Court; San Diego, CA 92123
- Agency executive: Kelly A. Martinez, Sheriff

Facilities
- Stations: 18
- Jails: 7

Website
- sdsheriff.gov

The San Diego County Sheriff's Office (SDSO) is a law enforcement agency serving San Diego County, California. It was established in 1850. It is the largest law enforcement agency in the county and one of the largest sheriff's offices in the United States, with over 4,206 employees, an annual budget of over $1.3 billion, and a service area over 4,500 square miles extending to a 60-mile international border.

The office provides general law enforcement and public safety services to all unincorporated areas of the county (traffic enforcement, accidents, and other traffic related issues are handled by the California Highway Patrol). Nine incorporated cities within the county (Del Mar, Encinitas, Imperial Beach, Lemon Grove, Poway, San Marcos, Santee, Solana Beach, and Vista) contract with the office for municipal law enforcement and public safety services. Within these cities, traffic enforcement is also provided.

The office operates and provides detention facilities (jails), court services, and specialized regional services (air support, search and rescue, SWAT, etc.) to all of the county and the nine contract cities. The Wireless Services Division is responsible for the day-to-day operations of the San Diego County–Imperial County Regional Communications System. The Sheriff is elected by the voters of San Diego County. The current Sheriff is Kelly Martinez, who was elected in 2022 and took office at the beginning of 2023.

== History ==
The San Diego County Sheriff’s Department was formed in 1850.

The San Diego County Sheriff's Office was a co-appellant in the Supreme Court of the United States and Ninth Circuit cases Kolender v. Lawson, 461 U.S. 352 (1983), which held unconstitutional laws that allow law enforcement to demand that "loiterers" and "wanderers" provide identification; this continues to affect other offices nationwide.

On September 10, 2024, the agency's official name was changed from San Diego County Sheriff’s Department to the San Diego County Sheriff’s Office.

On March 6, 2025, KPBS reported findings by the ACLU that Sheriff Kelly Martinez violated the state sanctuary law SB54 by transferring to ICE a felon who was still protected by the act because his conviction was more than the required 15 years old.

== County detention system ==
The Sheriff’s Office operates a system of seven detention facilities throughout San Diego. The San Diego Central Jail (SDCJ) is located in Downtown San Diego, Both George Bailey Detention Facility (GBDF), The Rock Mountain Detention Facility (RMDF), and East Mesa Reentry Facility (EMRF) is located in Otay Mesa, San Diego in the southern enclave of San Diego, California. Las Colinas Detention and Reentry Facility (LCDRF) is located in Santee, California. South Bay Detention Facility (SBDF) is located in Chula Vista, California. The Vista Detention Facility (VDF) is located in Vista, California.

=== Concerns and challenges ===
The San Diego County Jail incarcerates about on an average day in 2022, there were 4,305 people in county jails and with such large numbers, the jail has faced numerous problems with its facilities.

One of the main concerns within the San Diego County detention facilities is death of inmates, while in custody. The San Diego County jails system set a record high of 18 deaths in 2021. Then Sheriff Kelly Martinez took over in February 2022, and the jails matched its record total deaths again. In 2022, a report from the California State Auditor found that while individuals were in custody at county jails, San Diego County reported the second‑highest number of in‑custody deaths over the time frame of 2006-2021. The San Diego County Board of Supervisors Citizens Law Enforcement Review Board (CLERB) created a semi-annual report, due to the concerns about the rate of deaths in San Diego. The Board noted that from 2006 through 2020, 185 people died in San Diego County’s jails. The report also found that inmates who died in the county's jails had been in custody for only a few days or several months, while others were waiting to be sentenced, set to be released or about to be transferred.

In 2024, at least nine people died while in county jail.

Another concern is that lack of accountability from those in charge. According to Justice Department data, 47 people died between 2021 and 2023, Sheriff Kelly Martinez and her predecessor, repeatedly refused requests from the CLERB to put her deputies through scanners before they start their shifts to reduce the flow of drugs into facilities. This request from the board came after two jail deputies pleaded guilty to drug-related charges last year, one for burglary of medication from a jail prescription medication drop-off box and the other for possession of cocaine on jail property. In December 2024 the County supervisors voted for stronger law enforcement review board powers. It has been noted that even having the sheriff to appear at CLERB meetings has been a struggle.

Families of people who died in jail have expressed their frustration with the sheriff and the jails policy, especially Martinez refusal to scan jail staff for drugs. Thirteen inmates died from drug overdoses in San Diego jails between 2021 and 2023.

Lonnie Rupard Jail Homicide

On March 17, 2022, Lonnie Rupard, a 46‑year‑old man diagnosed with schizophrenia, died while in custody at the San Diego Central Jail. The San Diego County Medical Examiner ruled his death a homicide, citing pneumonia, malnutrition, dehydration, and untreated mental‑health conditions. A federal civil rights lawsuit was filed by his sons, Justino Rupard (lead plaintiff) and Ronnie Rupard, alleging that Sheriff Kelly A. Martinez, jail medical staff, and county personnel acted with deliberate indifference to Lonnie’s deteriorating condition.

According to the lawsuit, Lonnie was housed in a cell “littered with feces and trash” and was denied adequate psychiatric and medical care while in custody. His death occurred during a period of heightened scrutiny of the county’s detention system. As noted in official reporting, “San Diego County reported the second‑highest number of in‑custody deaths over the time frame of 2006–2021” and “185 people died in San Diego County’s jails” between 2006 and 2020.

Significance and Impact on Reform

Lonnie Rupard’s homicide became one of the most influential cases driving calls for reform within the San Diego County jail system. His death highlighted multiple systemic failures—medical neglect, inadequate mental‑health treatment, and insufficient supervision—that advocates and oversight bodies had warned about for years. The case gained particular attention because it illustrated how individuals with severe mental illness were left without meaningful care, even as the Sheriff’s Office faced rising in‑custody deaths.

The attached document notes that “families of people who died in jail have expressed their frustration with the sheriff and the jails policy,” reflecting the broader public response to Lonnie’s death and others like it.

Lonnie’s homicide ruling became a leading factor for change because:

It exposed extreme medical neglect in a case where the cause of death was directly tied to treatable conditions.

It demonstrated the failure of intake screening and mental‑health protocols, prompting renewed demands for clinical oversight.

It occurred during a period of record‑high jail deaths, amplifying public and legislative pressure.

It involved a federal civil rights lawsuit led by his son, Justino Rupard, which brought national attention to the Sheriff’s Office’s handling of vulnerable detainees.

It became a central example cited by reform advocates, journalists, and oversight boards when arguing for stronger accountability measures, including medical staffing increases, drug‑smuggling prevention, and independent review authority.

As a result, Lonnie Rupard’s death is widely regarded as a pivotal moment in the push for improved medical care, mental‑health treatment, and transparency within San Diego County’s detention facilities.

Sheriff Martinez described to the board the steps that the Sheriff's Office has done to improve medical care in the jails. She now has three directors of nursing instead of one and is hiring nursing assistants to help with the shortages of nurses. In addition, each of the three intake jails now have emergency room-trained doctors that will assess a person's medical needs upon booking. Sheriff Martinez also stated they have created new standards for what hospitals must check when a person is brought in for booking medical clearance.

Sheriff Martinez also reported to the board that there were no suicides in 2024, and none so far this year (2025). She stated to the board, "Our focus has been on preventing suicides from occurring, we're not taking a victory lap by any means, but we're very proud of our record." This being an improvement from former Sheriff Gore's tenure that lasted 13 years where the average suicide was about three a year, including 22 between 2013-2016.

Sheriff Martinez also addressed the issue of overdoses in the jails. She reported the Sheriff's Office has purchased new body scanners, added drug-sniffing dogs, and implemented random screenings to prevent smuggling. Furthermore, Medication-assisted treatment is now officered to incarcerated persons to ease withdrawal symptoms when they come into custody. In all, Sheriff Martinez stated these efforts have reduced the amount of drugs being smuggled into the jails.

In an earlier article published by the San Diego Union Tribune, it was noted that as an ongoing effort to reduce deaths in custody, the San Diego Sheriff's Office would soon begin testing biometric monitoring devices designed to alert staff when an incarcerated person is in medical distress. According to Sheriff Martinez, the department planned to pilot the devices in the downtown Central jail and at Las Colinas Detention and Re-entry Facility with. Sheriff Martinez described the device as being "more like an Apple watch." This device would measure vital signs, heartrate and respiration, and were designed to send an alert to staff if a person's condition suddenly changed.

== Organization ==
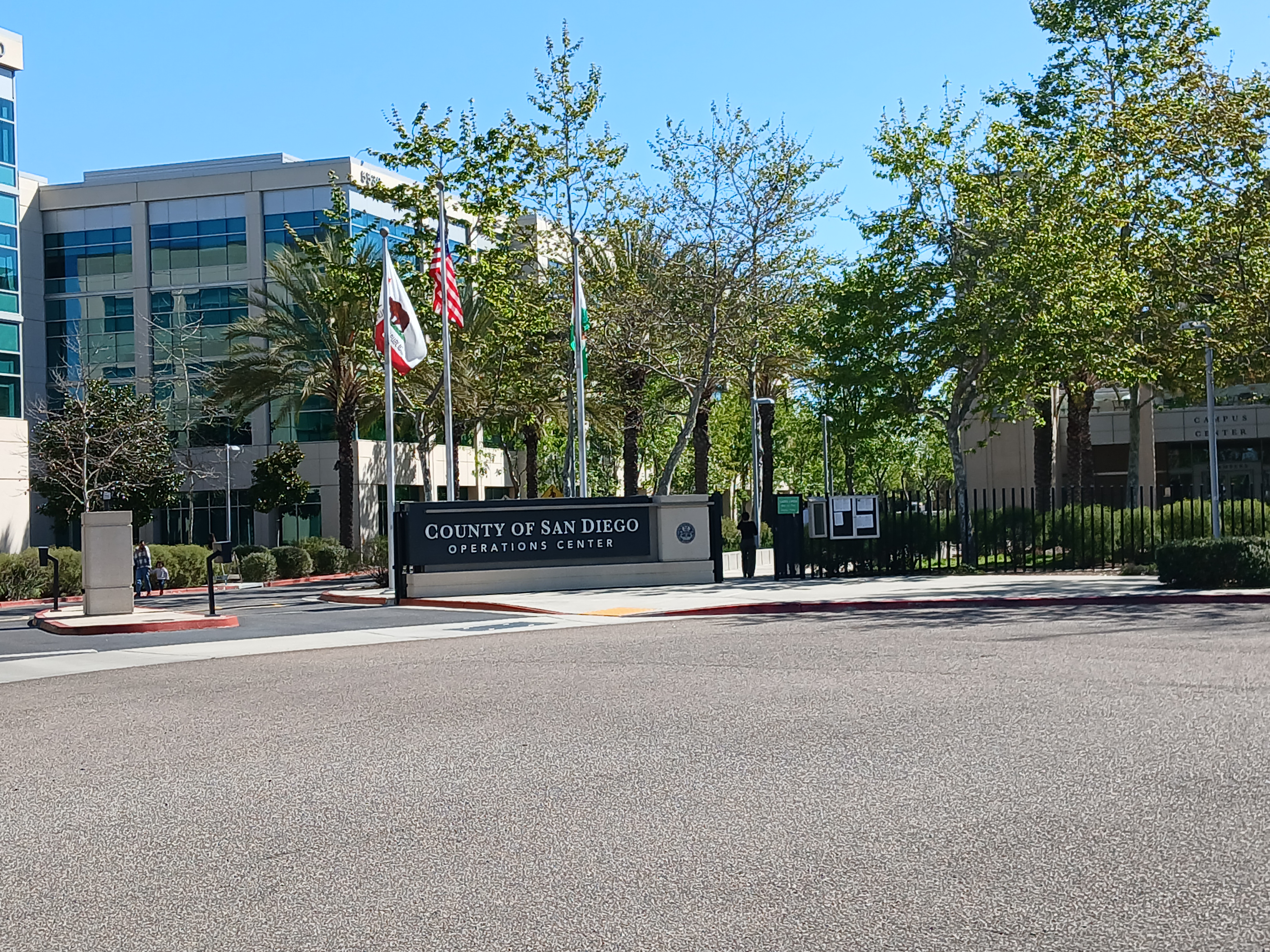
San Diego County Sheriff's Department Regional Crime Laboratory

=== Office of the Sheriff ===
- Public Affairs
- Intergovernmental Legislative Affairs
- Legal Affairs
- Senior Executive Assistant
- Division of Inspectional Services

=== Service bureaus ===
The San Diego County Sheriff's Office is organized into five service bureaus: Law Enforcement Services, Detention Facility Services, Court Services, Human Resource Services, and Management Services. Each bureau is managed by an Assistant Sheriff except the Management Services Bureau, which is headed by an Executive Director.

==== Law Enforcement Services Bureau ====
- Major Crimes Division
  - Central Operations Detail
    - Computer And Technology Crime High-tech Response Team (CATCH)
    - Elder Abuse
    - Financial Crimes
    - Homicide Detail
  - Family Protection Detail
    - Domestic Violence
    - Sex Offender Management Unit
    - Child Abuse Unit
- Communications Division
  - Communications Center
- Emergency Services Division
  - Arson/Explosives
  - ASTREA (air support unit)
  - Dive Unit (Search and Recovery)
  - Reserves
  - Search and Rescue
  - Special Enforcement Detail (SED)/SWAT
- Special Investigations Division
  - Intelligence
  - Narcotics
  - Public Inspections
  - Street Gang/Narcotics

===== Patrol Stations, Substations and Field Offices =====
4S Ranch Substation 10282 Rancho Bernardo Rd San Diego, CA 92127

Alpine Station 2751 Alpine Blvd Alpine, CA 91901

Borrego Springs Office 571 Palm Canyon Dr. Borrego Springs, CA 92004

Boulevard/Jacumba Substation 39919 Highway 94 Boulevard, CA 91905

Campo/Tecate Substation 378 Sheridan Rd Campo, CA 91906

North Coastal Station (formerly Encinitas Station) 175 N. El Camino Real Encinitas, CA 92024

Fallbrook Substation 388 East Alvarado St Fallbrook, CA 92028

Imperial Beach Station 845 Imperial Beach Blvd Imperial Beach, CA 91932

Lakeside Substation 12365 Parkside St. Lakeside, CA 92040

Julian Substation 2907 Washington St, Bldg C Julian, CA 92036

Lemon Grove Substation 3240 Main St Lemon Grove, CA 91945

Pine Valley Substation 28914 Old Highway 80, #106 Pine Valley, CA 91962

Poway Station 13100 Bowron Rd Poway, CA 92064

Ramona Substation 1424 Montecito Rd Ramona, CA 92065

Rancho San Diego Station 11486 Campo Rd. Spring Valley, CA 91978

Ranchita Office 25704 San Felipe Rd, S-2 Warner Springs, CA 92086

San Marcos Station 182 Santar Pl San Marcos, CA 92069

Santee Station 8811 Cuyamaca St Santee, CA 92071

Valley Center Substation 28201 N. Lake Wohlford Rd Valley Center, CA 92082

Vista Station 325 S. Melrose, Ste 210 Vista, CA 92081

==== Detention Services Bureau ====
- San Diego Central Jail (SDCJ)
- George Bailey Detention Facility (GBDF)
- East Mesa Reentry Facility (EMRF)
- Las Colinas Detention and Reentry Facility (LCDRF)
- South Bay Detention Facility (SBDF)
- Vista Detention Facility (VDF)
- Rock Mountain Detention Facility (RMDF)

==== Human Resource Services Bureau ====
- Personnel Division
  - Background Investigations Unit
  - Career Path Assessment Unit
  - Recruiting Unit
- Professional Standards Division
  - Internal Affairs Unit
  - Risk Management Unit
- Training Division
  - Detentions and Court Services Academy
  - In-Service Training Unit
  - Regional Basic Academy
  - Weapons Training Unit (Range)

==== Management Services Bureau ====
- Data Services Division
- Wireless Services Division
- Contracts Division
- Fiscal Services

== Vehicles ==
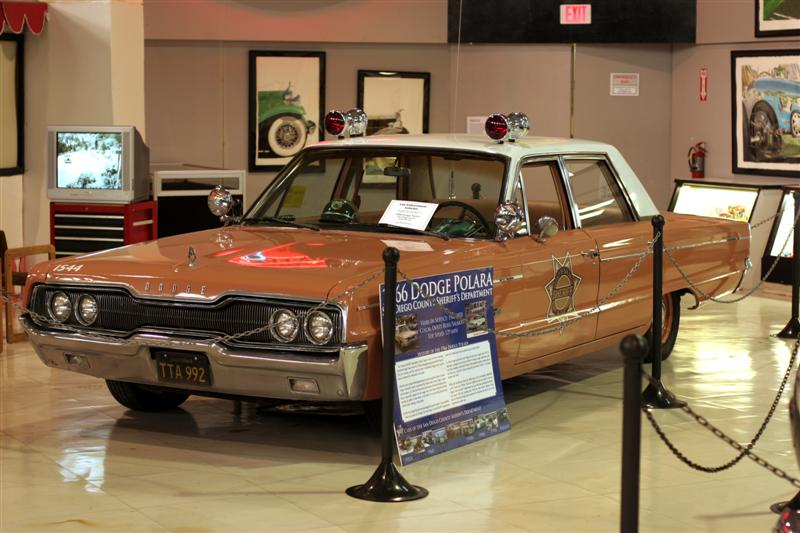
Salmon-colored 1966 Dodge Polara

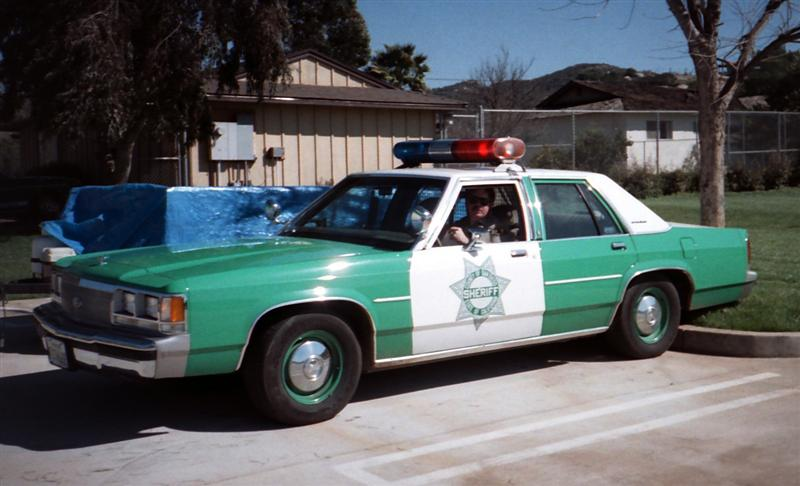
Green-and-white Ford LTD Crown Victoria, in 1991.

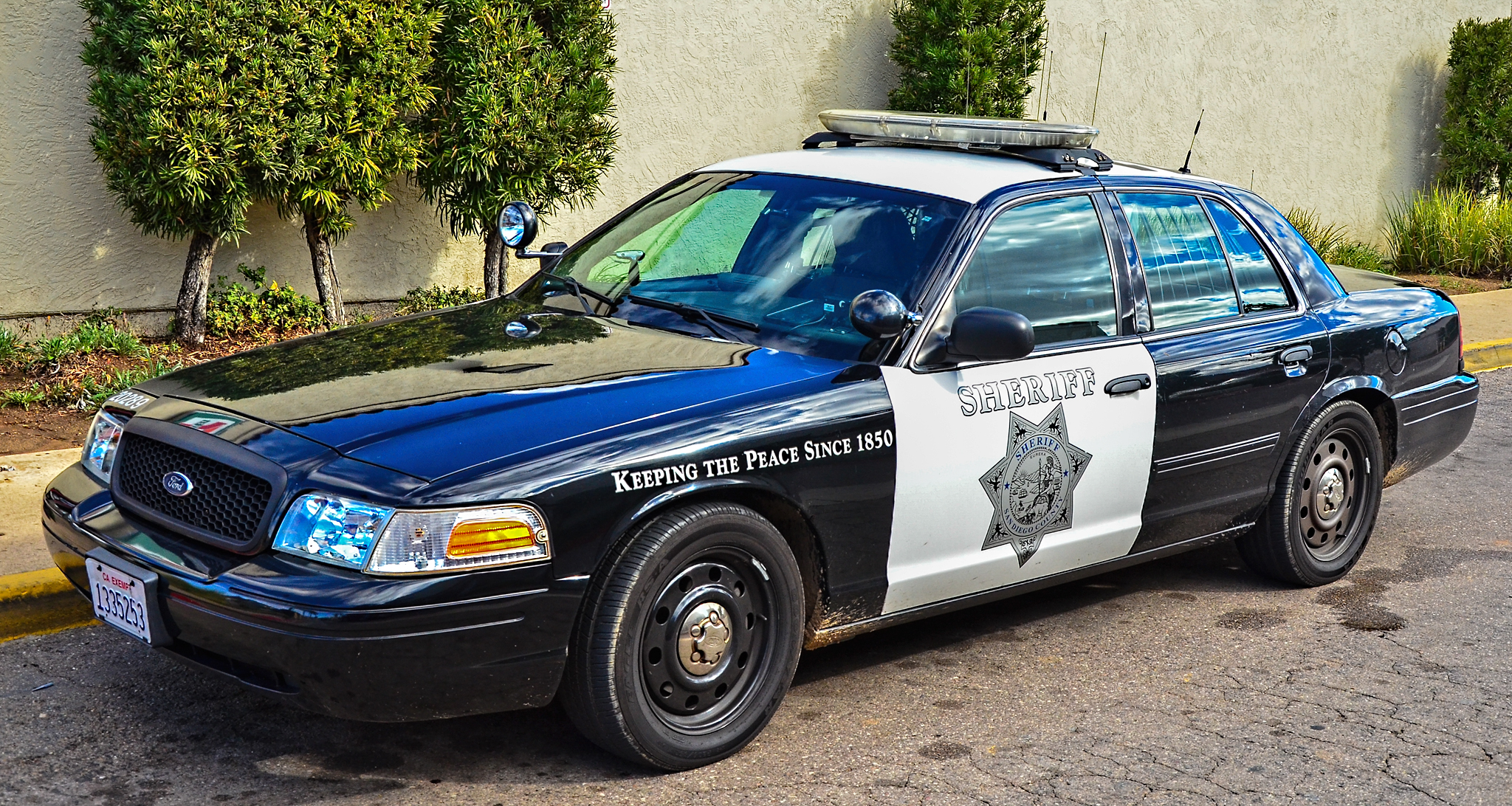
Black-and-white second generation Ford Crown Victoria Police Interceptor in 2015

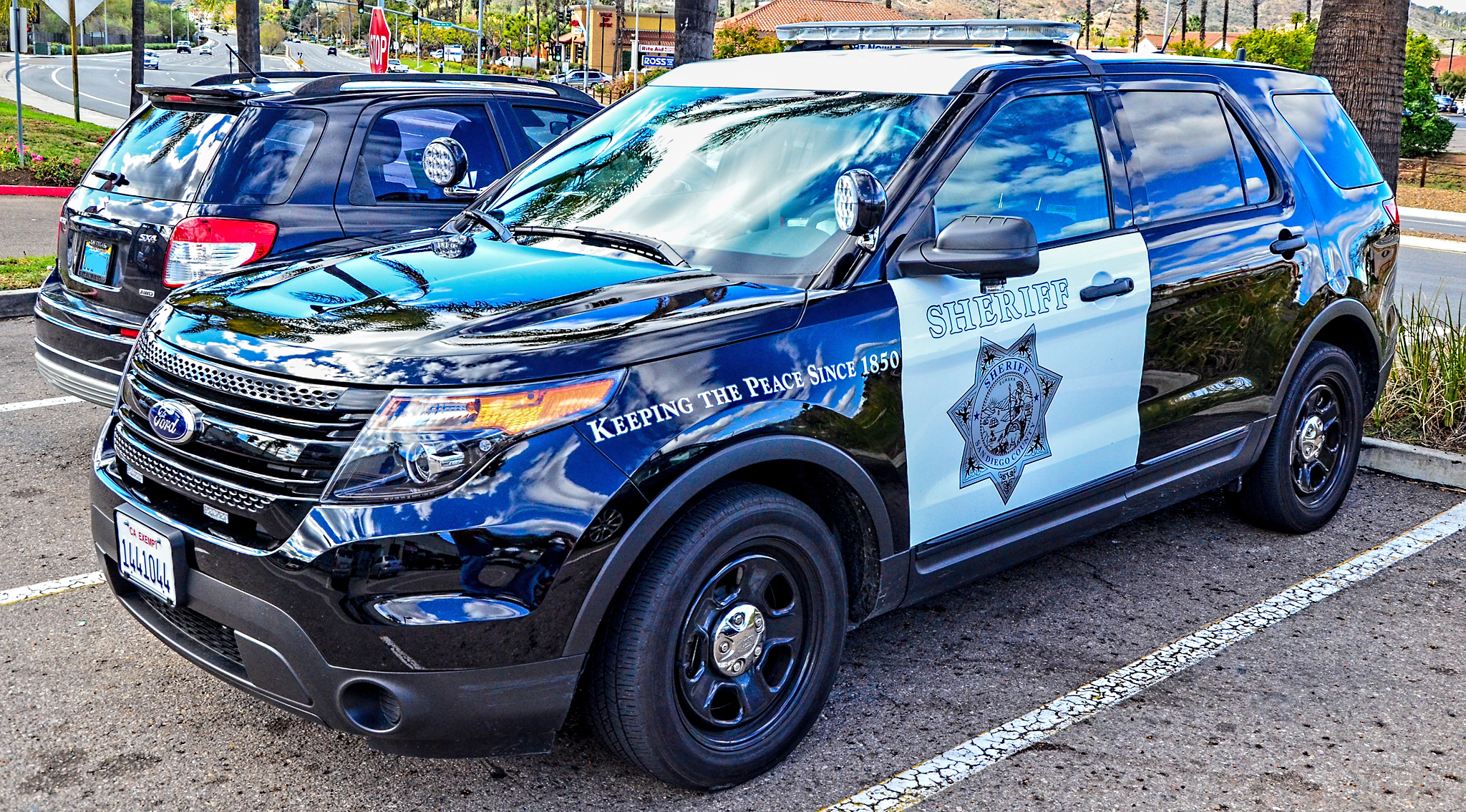
Black-and-white Ford Police Interceptor Utility in 2015

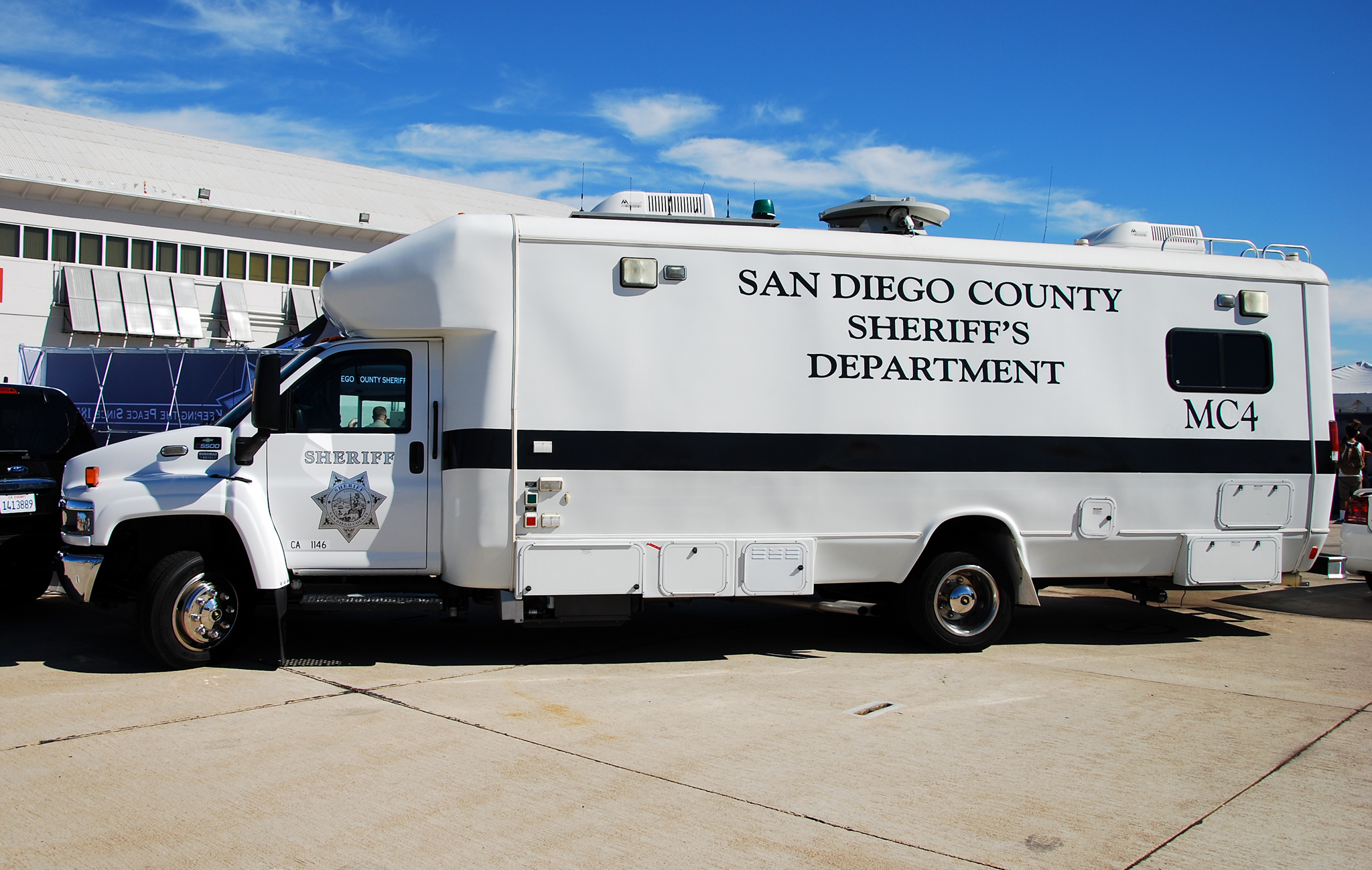
Marine Corps Air Station Miramar

Over the years, the agency's marked vehicles have sported unusual paint schemes. Originally in a traditional black and white, they transitioned to a pink-salmon color in the 1960s. From 1971 to 1991 the vehicles were painted kelly green-and-white which were the campaign colors of Sheriff John F. Duffy. When he retired the fleet was returned to the black-and-white color scheme and has remained so ever since. The office has also had a few all-white cars over the years, but these were for Traffic Enforcement and Volunteer Patrols only.

Today, the San Diego County Sheriff's Office utilizes the Ford Explorer as their base model for their fleet.

The SDSO also operates the Following Aircraft: Bell 205, Bell 407, and Bell 412.

== Weapons ==
- Glock 17 – standard-issue handgun equipped with a Streamlight TLR-1.
- Glock 22 .40 S&W – previously standard issue, being phased out.
- Glock 23 .40 S&W – used by detectives and other investigators, some regular deputies carry it as well as an off-duty weapon.
- Glock 27 .40 S&W – backup gun for deputies, used by some investigators as well as an off-duty weapon for some deputies.
- Colt AR-15 Law Enforcement Carbine .223 Remington/5.56×45mm - LE6920 variant of the Colt AR-15 semi-automatic rifle, issued to deputies as a patrol rifle.
- Springfield Armory M-14 .308 Winchester – select fire battle rifle used for certain situations, is not the standard-issue rifle but the SDSO does have a few M-14s in the agency's inventory.
- Remington 870 12-gauge — standard-issue pump action shotgun for deputies.
- Aero Precision AR-10 .308 Winchester - used as a medium range high-power patrol rifle by qualified deputies.
- Knights Armament SR-25 Rifle 7.62×51mm NATO - Designated marksman rifle used by the Special Enforcement Detail and SWAT deputies.
- Accuracy International AW308 .308 Winchester - sniper rifle with a 20 in (510 mm) barrel used by the Special Enforcement Detail and SWAT deputies.
- McMillan TAC-50 .50 BMG — long range sniper and anti-materiel rifle used by the Special Enforcement Detail for penetrating armor and disabling vehicles.
- M4 carbine 5.56×45mm - select fire automatic assault rifle used by the Special Enforcement Detail and SWAT deputies.
- Heckler & Koch HK33 5.56×45mm - select fire assault rifle used by the Special Enforcement Detail and SWAT deputies, the HK33 is an assault rifle derived from the MP5 with a longer 15.4 in (390 mm) barrel. The SDCSO has the HK53 variant, which has a shorter 8.3 in (210 mm) barrel.
- Heckler & Koch MP5 9×19mm - submachine gun used by the Special Enforcement Detail and SWAT deputies with a 8.9 in (230 mm) barrel, the SDCSO also has the HK94 semi-automatic civilian-legal MP5 variant with a 16.54 in (420 mm) barrel for corrections officers.
- M240 machine gun 7.62×51mm - belt-fed machine gun used by the Special Enforcement Detail and SWAT deputies to defend against an attack from criminals that have access to armored vehicles, automatic weapons & armor piercing incendiary rounds, and to defend against a large-scale terrorist attack.

== Sheriffs ==
1. Agoston Haraszthy, 1850–1851
2. George F. Hooper, 1852–1853
3. William Conroy, 1853–1854
4. M. M. Sexton, 1854–1855
5. Joseph Reiner, 1856–1857
6. D. A. Hollister, 1857–1858
7. George Lyons, 1858–1861
8. James McCoy, 1862–1871
9. Samuel W. Craigue, 1871–1874
10. Nicholas Hunsaker, 1875–1876
11. Joseph Coyne, 1876–1882
12. Edward W. Bushyhead, 1883–1886
13. Samuel A. McDowell, 1887–1890
14. John H. Folks, 1891–1892
15. Augustus Cravath, 1892
16. Ben P. Hill, 1893–1894
17. Frank S. Jennings, 1895–1902
18. Thomas W. Brodnax, 1903–1906
19. Fred M. Jennings, 1907–1914
20. Ralph Conklin, 1915–1918
21. James C. Byers, 1918–1929
22. Edgar F. Cooper, 1929–1935
23. Ernest W. Dort, 1936–1941
24. Bert Strand, 1941–1962
25. Elmer Jansen, 1962–1963
26. Joseph C. O'Connor, 1963–1971
27. John F. Duffy, 1971–1991
28. Jim Roache, 1991–1995
29. William B. Kolender, 1995-2009
30. William D. Gore, 2009–2022
31. Anthony Ray 2022-2023 (Interim Sheriff)
32. Kelly A. Martinez, 2023–present

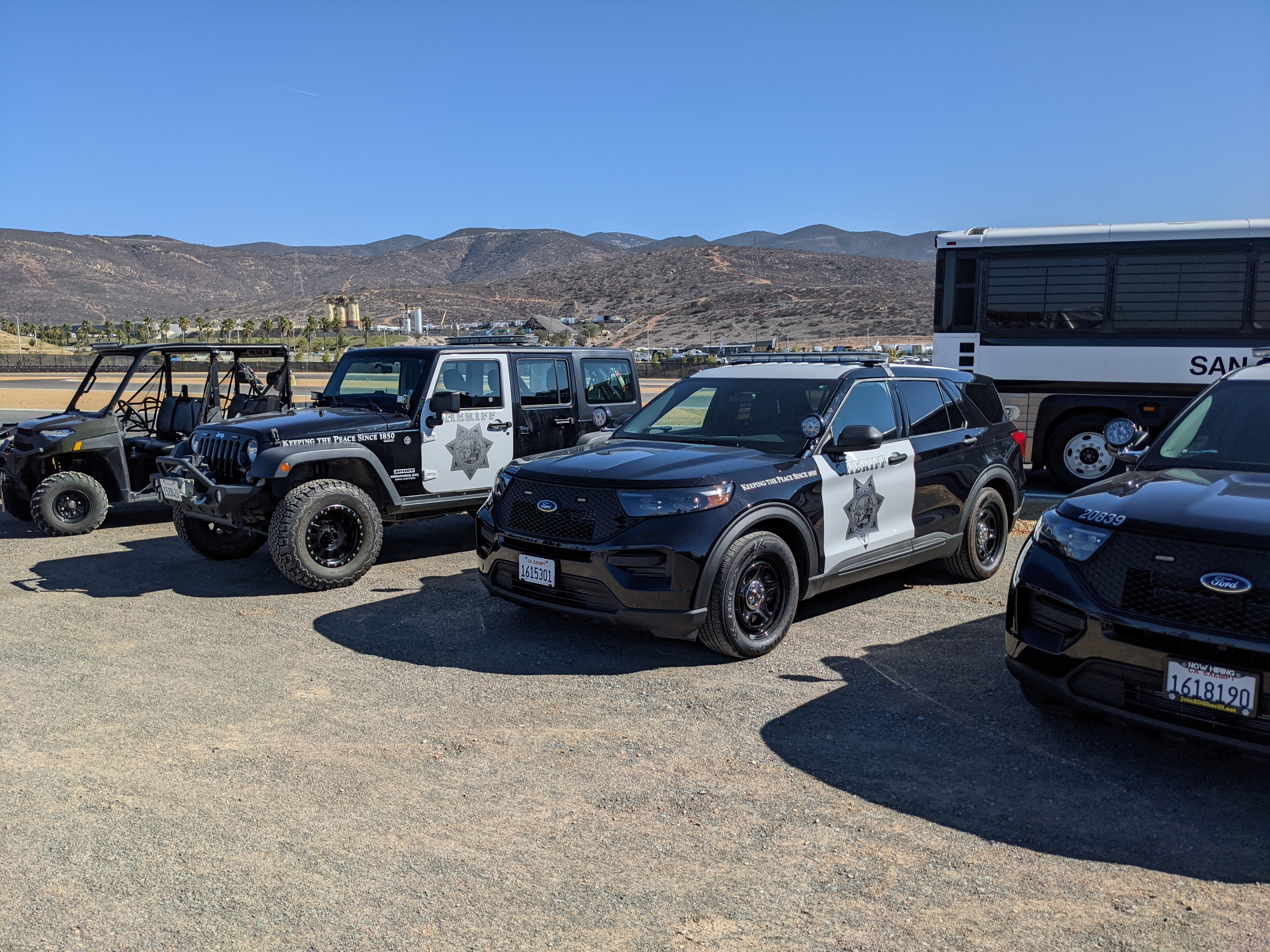
San Diego County Sheriff's Vehicles 2021

== Deputies killed in line of duty ==
1. Andrew Kriss, May 25, 1864, gunfire
2. Will Ward, November 27, 1899, assault
3. Thomas A. Fay, May 17, 1919, gunfire
4. Herbert Sibert, July 13, 1949, Automobile crash
5. Donn G. Witt, September 25, 1983, illness
6. Kelly Ann Bazer, January 13, 1986, gunfire
7. Lonny Gene Brewer, December 5, 1987, gunfire
8. Theodore L. Beckmann Jr., February 8, 1989, vehicular assault
9. Patrick Steven Coyle, February 16, 1997, aircraft accident
10. Ken Collier, February 28, 2010, vehicle pursuit
11. Matt Gibbs, August 21, 2021, COVID-19
12. Ramon (Al) Cazarez, April 10, 2023, COVID-19

== Rank structure ==
Title	Insignia
Sheriff	
Undersheriff	
Assistant Sheriff	
Commander	
Captain	
Lieutenant	
Sergeants	
Corporal	
Deputy Sheriff	

== See also ==
- David Myers (police officer)
- List of law enforcement agencies in California
