= David Mays (disambiguation) =

David Mays (fl. 1980s–2000s) is a journalist and magazine proprietor.

David or Dave Mays may also refer to:

- David J. Mays (1896–1971), lawyer and 1953 Pulitzer Prize winner
- Dave Mays (baseball) (1910–1993), American baseball player
- Dave Mays (born 1949), American football quarterback

== See also ==
- David May (disambiguation)
