= AirShow San Diego =

- Genre: Air show
- Venue: Gillespie Field
- Location: El Cajon, California
- Country: United States
- Organizer: Commemorative Air Force

AirShow San Diego (formerly Wings over Gillespie) was an air show usually held during the first weekend of June at Gillespie Field in El Cajon, California. It was conducted by the San Diego wing (Air Group One) of the Commemorative Air Force. It is a regular stop for many "warbirds" that make the airshow circuit each year, including the CAF's B-17 Flying Fortress Sentimental Journey. In recent years the air show has shown a larger number of flying demonstrations at what was at one time a mostly static air show.

The annual airshow had been cancelled since 2016 due to rising costs of putting on such an event. There are still many "warbirds" that fly in and out of Gillespie every week, however there is no permanent schedule for these flights.

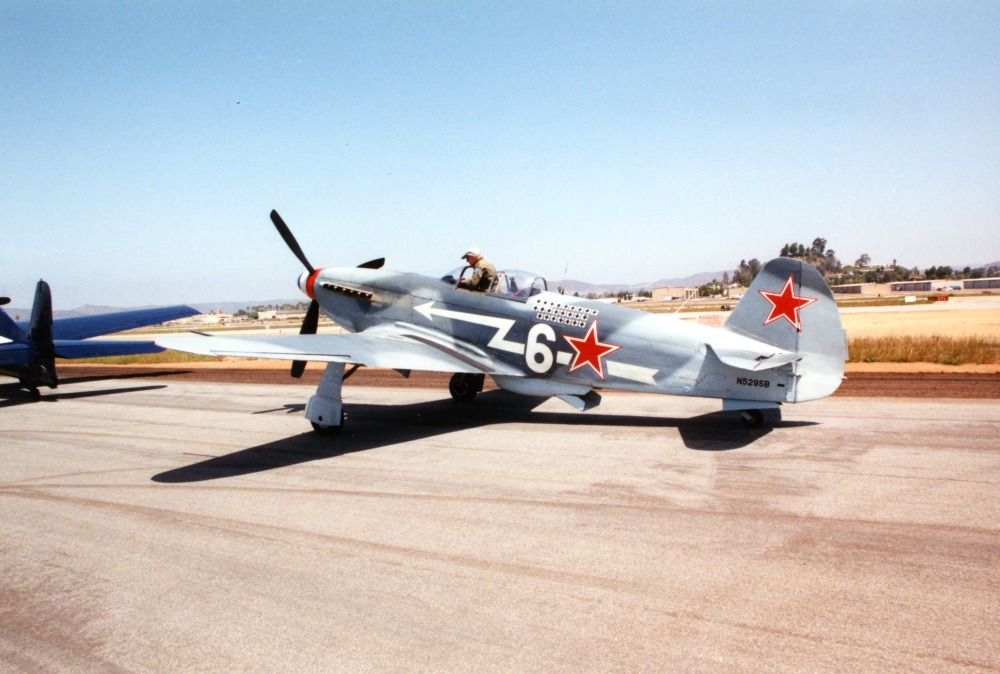
Soviet Yakovlev Yak-9UM at eighth annual Wings over Gillespie

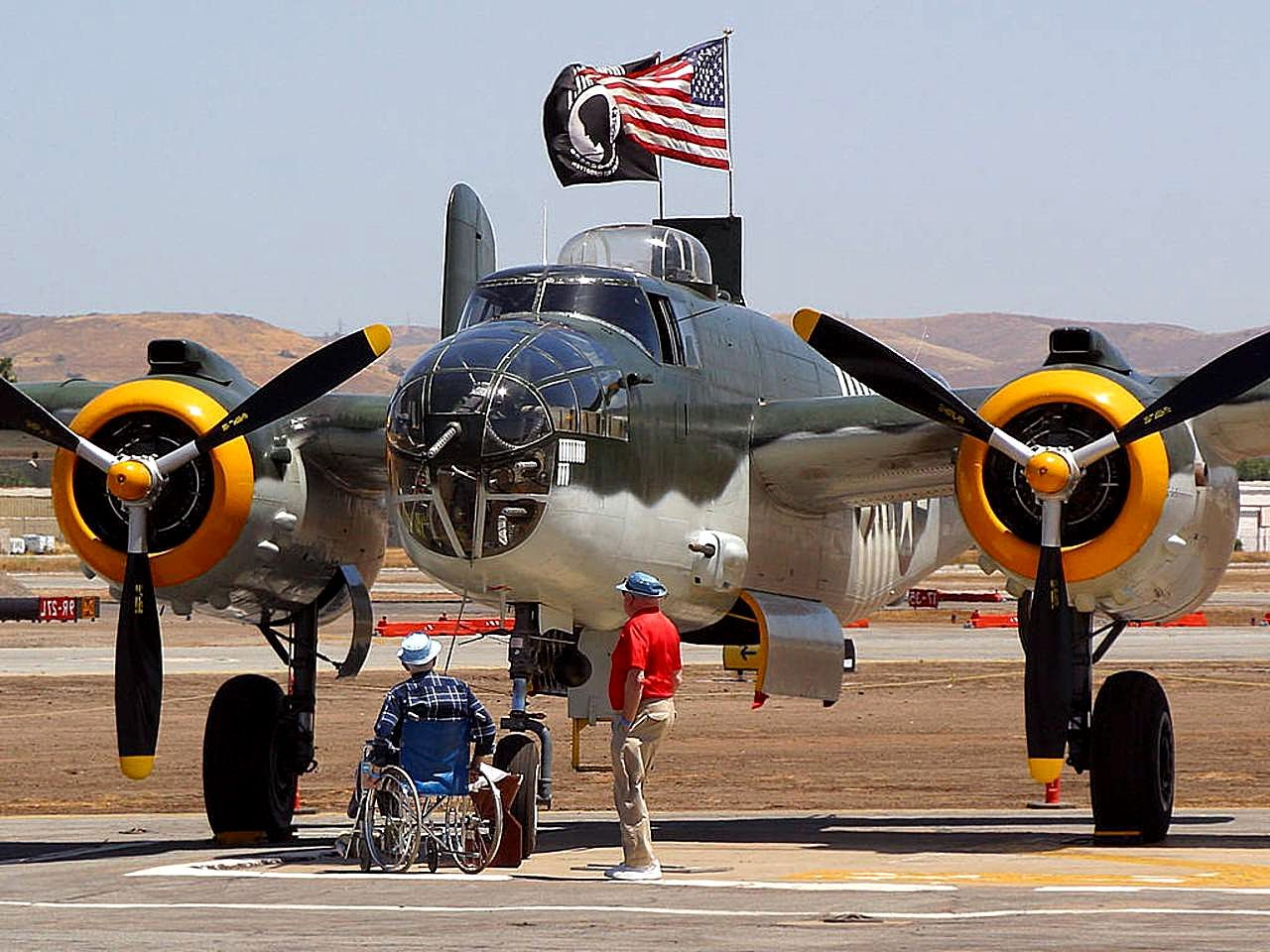
B-25 Mitchell

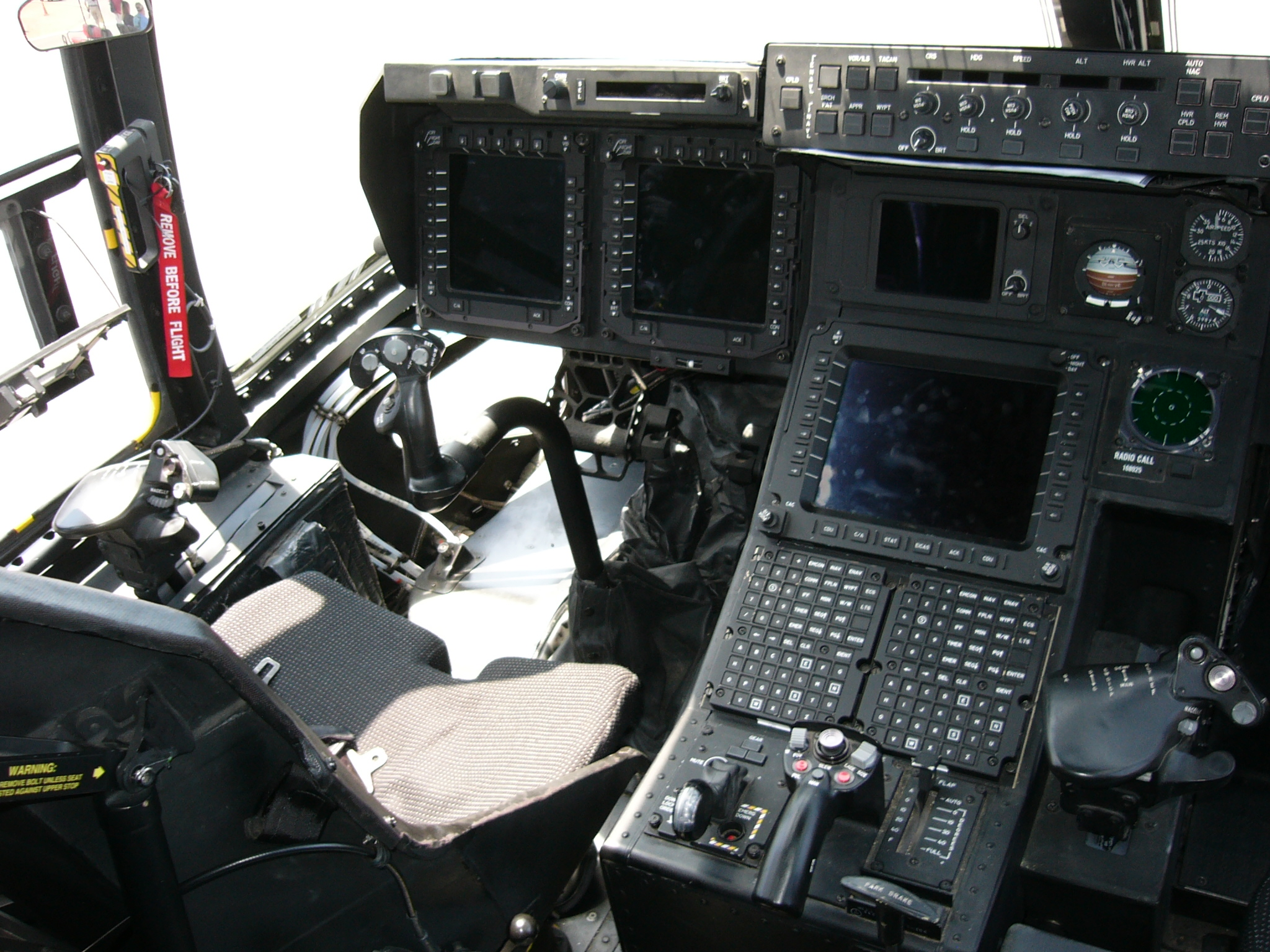
Cockpit of a V-22 Osprey at the 2012 airshow

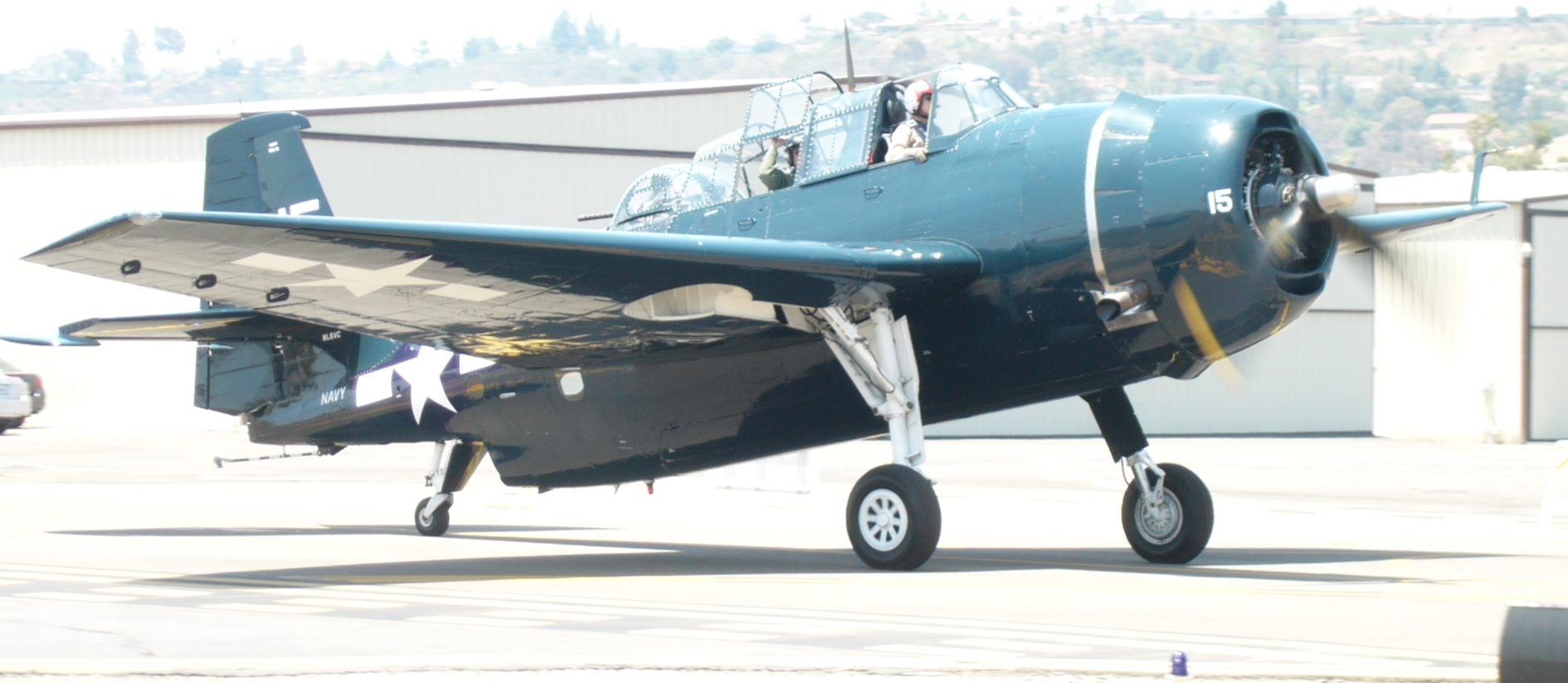
Grumman TBF Avenger on the tarmac at the 2012 airshow

Gillespie Field is also the home of the San Diego Air & Space Museum Gillespie Field Annex. Housing their restoration department and auxiliary display of their extended collection of military aircraft and Atlas ICBM missile.
