= Gillespie Field =

- IATA: SEE; ICAO: KSEE; FAA LID: SEE

Summary
- Airport type: Public
- Owner: County of San Diego
- Serves: San Diego, California
- Location: El Cajon, California
- Elevation AMSL: 388 ft (118 m)
- Coordinates: 32°49′34″N 116°58′21″W
- Website: co.san-diego.ca.us/dpw/...

Maps
- FAA airport diagram
- Location within California Location within the United States

Runways
Direction	Length		Surface
Direction	ft	m	Surface
9L/27R	5,342	1,628	Asphalt
9R/27L	2,738	835	Asphalt
17/35	4,145	1,263	Asphalt

Statistics (2016)
- Aircraft operations: 226887
- Based aircraft: 547
- Source: Federal Aviation Administration

Gillespie Field (IATA: SEE, ICAO: KSEE, FAA LID: SEE) is a county-owned public airport in El Cajon, California. It is located 11.5 miles (18.5 km; 10 nmi) northeast of downtown San Diego.

== History ==
Section reference dates.

In 1942 the United States Marine Corps chose a site with 688 acres (278 ha) east of San Diego for parachute training for the newly forming parachute battalions. In September 1942, Camp Gillespie was completed and named in honor of Lieutenant Archibald H. Gillespie, a Marine officer who played a prominent role in the effort to separate California from Mexico in the 1840s. Three 256 feet (78 m) high towers were built from which the paratroopers practiced their jumps.

In February 1944, the camp was commissioned as Marine Corps Auxiliary Airfield Gillespie under the command of Marine Corps Air Station El Toro. MCAAF Gillespie soon became responsible for Camp Pendleton Outlying Air Field. Among the units that transited and trained at MCAAF Gillespie were VMSB-141, Air Warning Squadron 10 and the Navy's TBM-3 Avenger torpedo squadron VT-37.

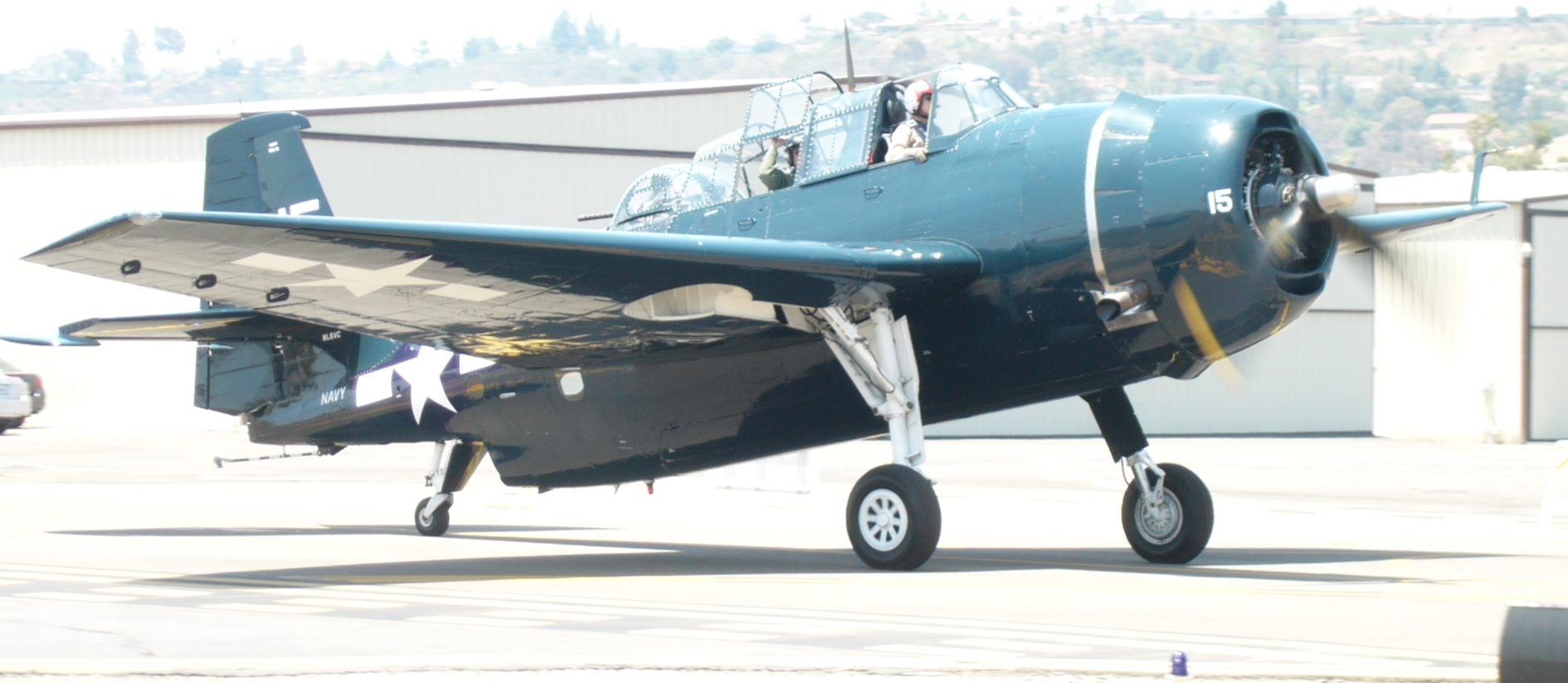
Grumman TBF Avenger on the tarmac at the 2012 Wings Over Gillespie airshow

In 1946 the airfield was turned over to San Diego County and became a general aviation facility.

In 1952 the County was granted ownership of the facility by the federal government.

In 1955, the County granted a 50-year lease for 180 acres (73 ha) of land adjacent, to the south, of the airport, which became the Cajon Speedway by 1961. The last race was run in 2004, and the County started expansion of the airport onto 70 acres (28 ha) of this land in 2005.

In 1971 the County Sheriff stationed ASTREA, a helicopter law enforcement base at the airport, and in 1993 the San Diego Aerospace Museum located its restoration operations and an exhibit at the field.

== Facilities and operations ==
Gillespie Field covers 758 acres (307 ha) and has three asphalt runways:

- Runway 9L/27R: 5,342 ft × 100 ft (1,628 m × 30 m)
- Runway 9R/27L: 2,738 ft × 60 ft (835 m × 18 m)
- Runway 17/35: 4,145 ft × 100 ft (1,263 m × 30 m)

For the 12-month period ending December 31, 2016 the airport had 226,887 aircraft operations, average 622 per day: 99.8% general aviation, <1% air taxi and <1% military. At that time there were 547 aircraft are based at the airport: 86% single-engine, 7% multi-engine, 3% helicopter, 3% jet and 1% glider.

== San Diego Air & Space Museum Gillespie Field Annex ==
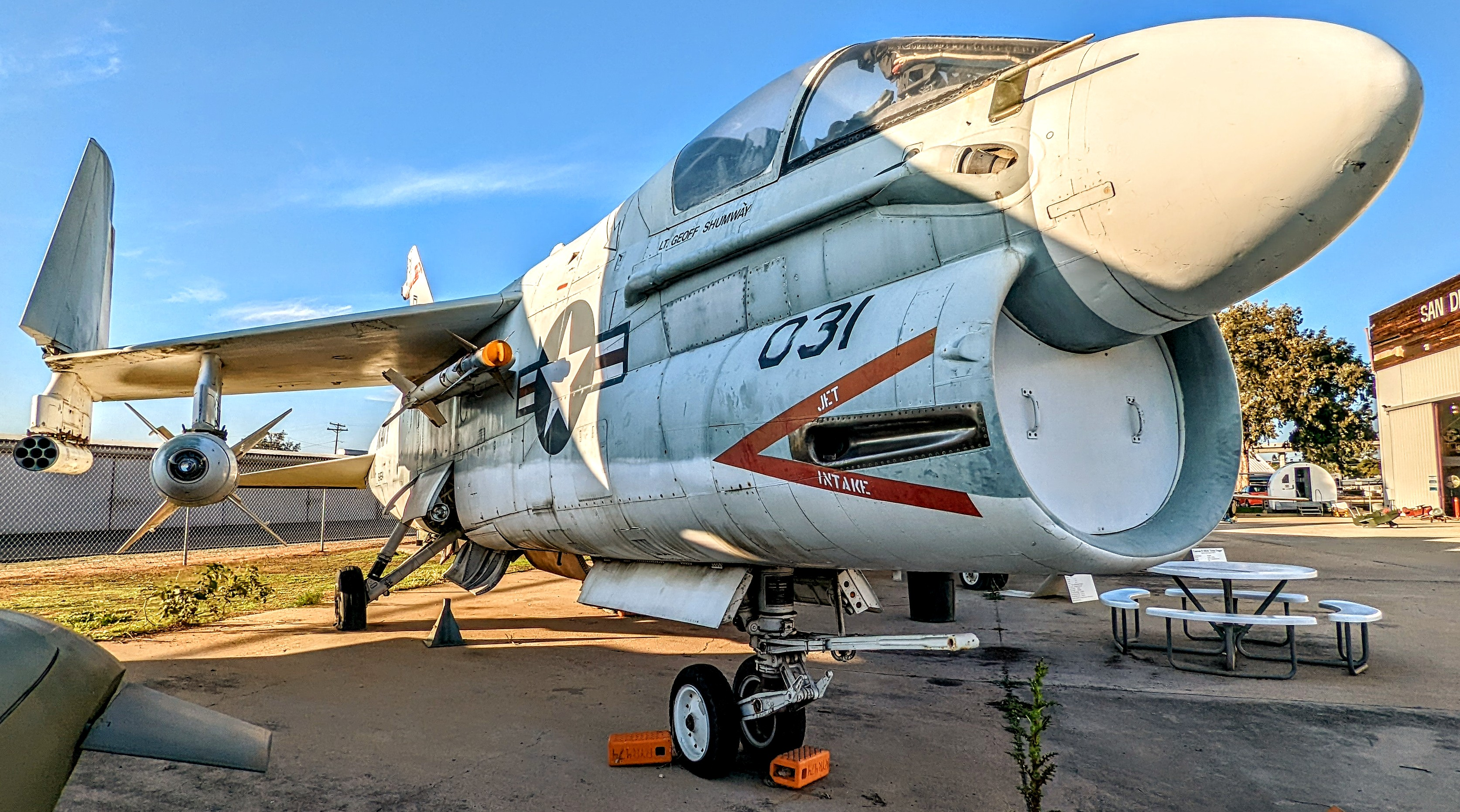
A-7B 154554 Corsair at SDASM Annex

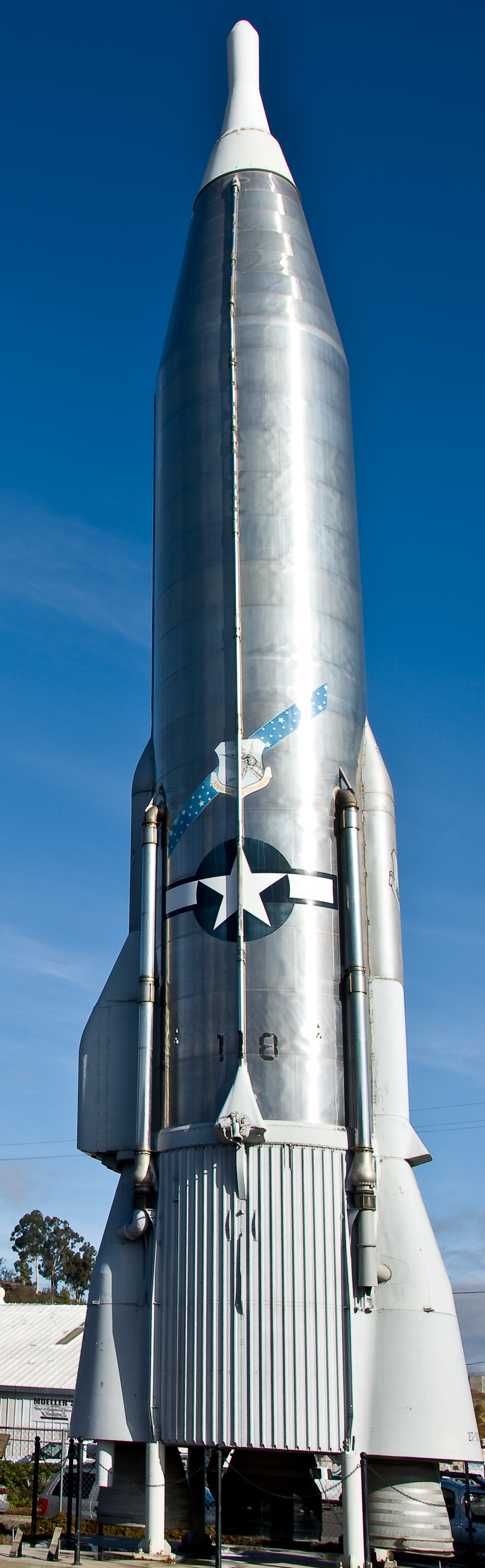
Atlas 2E ballistic missile on display at the San Diego Aerospace Museum

Gillespie is the home of the restoration facility Gillespie Field Annex for the San Diego Air & Space Museum. It is open to the public and has on display many vintage and modern aircraft. It has an Atlas ICBM rocket as its gate guard, a recently restored F-102A Delta Dagger with drop tanks and AIM-4A Falcon missiles, and a Grumman F-14A Tomcat used in Top Gun: Maverick. 32.828421°N 116.966146°W

== Accidents and incidents ==
On 12 September 1988, a US Navy F-14A (BuNo 160675) of VF-124 with mechanical problems crashed into two hangars at Gillespie Field. Three persons on the ground and the two crew were injured, and 19 aircraft and 13 vehicles were damaged or destroyed.

On 27 December 2021, a Learjet 35 aircraft on a repositioning flight from John Wayne Airport crashed into a neighborhood east of El Cajon during an approach to Runway 27R. All four occupants were killed.

== See also ==
- Gillespie Field station
- List of airports in California
- List of United States Marine Corps installations
- AirShow San Diego, annual June airshow, formerly "Wings Over Gillespie"
