= David Myers (police officer) =

- Occupation: Former commander in the San Diego Sheriff's Department
- Years active: 1985-2018
- Known for: Police work, Sheriff campaigns

David Myers is a former commander and 33-year veteran of the San Diego County Sheriff's Department. He ran in the 2018 primary election to become the San Diego County Sheriff against his boss and 9-year-incumbent, Bill Gore. He is the highest-ranking openly gay employee to have served in the department, and would have been the first openly gay San Diego County Sheriff if elected. He lost on June 5, 2018, with 43.4% of the vote. He retired from the department after his defeat. Following Gore's retirement, Myers announced he would run again for the Sheriff's position in 2022.

== Career ==
Dave Myers worked for the San Diego Sheriff's Department from 1985 until his retirement in 2018. He became a Commander in 2012 and is the highest ranking openly gay employee to have served in the department.

=== Sheriff candidacy ===
Dave Myers announced his run for San Diego County Sheriff in February 2017 against his boss and 9-year-incumbent, Bill Gore. If elected, Myers would have been the first openly gay San Diego County Sheriff. Myers claimed to have experienced several instances of retaliation at work due to his candidacy.

During his run, Myers said the department does not respond well to community issues and criticized Gore's handling of important cases. Myers stated there is a lack of diversity in the force, and believes there needs to be more LGBT, women and minorities serving in the San Diego Sheriff's Department. Myers wanted to prohibit the shackling of pregnant inmates while they give birth. He wanted the department to focus on rehabilitation instead of incarceration for misdemeanors and low level drug offenses. Unlike Sheriff Gore, Myers has supported California's cannabis laws, citing the fact that 60% of San Diego residents voted to legalize cannabis in 2016. Myers called for greater transparency in the department and wanted to deploy body cameras for the entire San Diego Police Department so that videos of important incidents could be made available to the public within 24 hours.

Gore canceled a debate with Myers due to a scheduling conflict in March 2018. Gore stated he was unable to debate Myers due to laws limiting his ability to talk about employee conduct. In April 2018, Gore said during an interview that he used to be friends with Myers but now wished he could fire him.

On June 5, 2018, Myers lost with 43.4% of the vote to Gore's 56.4%.

Following Gore's retirement, Myers ran once again against then-undersheriff Kelly Martinez and John Hemmerling. His campaign emphasized concerns over deaths in jails, lack of transparency, and racial inequities in policing that required reform to address. Myers alleged that corruption and abuse of power were an issue among sheriff leadership.

On June 7, 2022, Myers lost again with 19% of the vote, one point behind the Republican candidate.
