= David Mayer =

David Mayer may refer to:

- David Mayer (historian) (1928–2023), American-British theatre historian
- David Mayer de Rothschild (born 1978), British adventurer, ecologist, and environmentalist
- David Delaney Mayer (born 1992), American filmmaker
- David R. Mayer (born 1967), American politician
- Akhmed Chatayev or David Mayer (1980–2017), Chechen Islamist and terrorist

== See also ==
- ChatGPT "David Mayer" error
- David Maier (born 1953), American computer scientist
- David Mair (disambiguation)
- David Meyer (disambiguation)
