= D. G. Myers (literary critic) =

American writer and literary critic

David G. Myers (February 27, 1952 – September 26, 2014) was an American writer and a renowned literary critic. He earned his PhD from Northwestern University and was a professor at Texas A&M and Ohio State University. He was the author of The Elephants Teach, a history of creative writing. Myers died in 2014 at the age of 62 after a long battle against cancer.

Between 2008 and 2014 Myers regularly posted reviews and literary essays on his Commonplace Blog, as well as essays about dealing with cancer.
