= David Meyer (disambiguation) =

David Meyer (born 1947) is an English actor.

David Meyer may also refer to:

- David E. Meyer (born 1943), educator and psychologist
- David Meyer (ice hockey) (fl. 1928), Belgian ice hockey player
- David J. Meyer, United States Air Force officer
- David Meyer (South African actor)
- David Janssen (David Harold Meyer, 1931–1980), American actor

== See also ==
- David Meyers (disambiguation)
- David Mayer (disambiguation)
- David Mair (disambiguation)
