= William Padula =

American professor and health economist

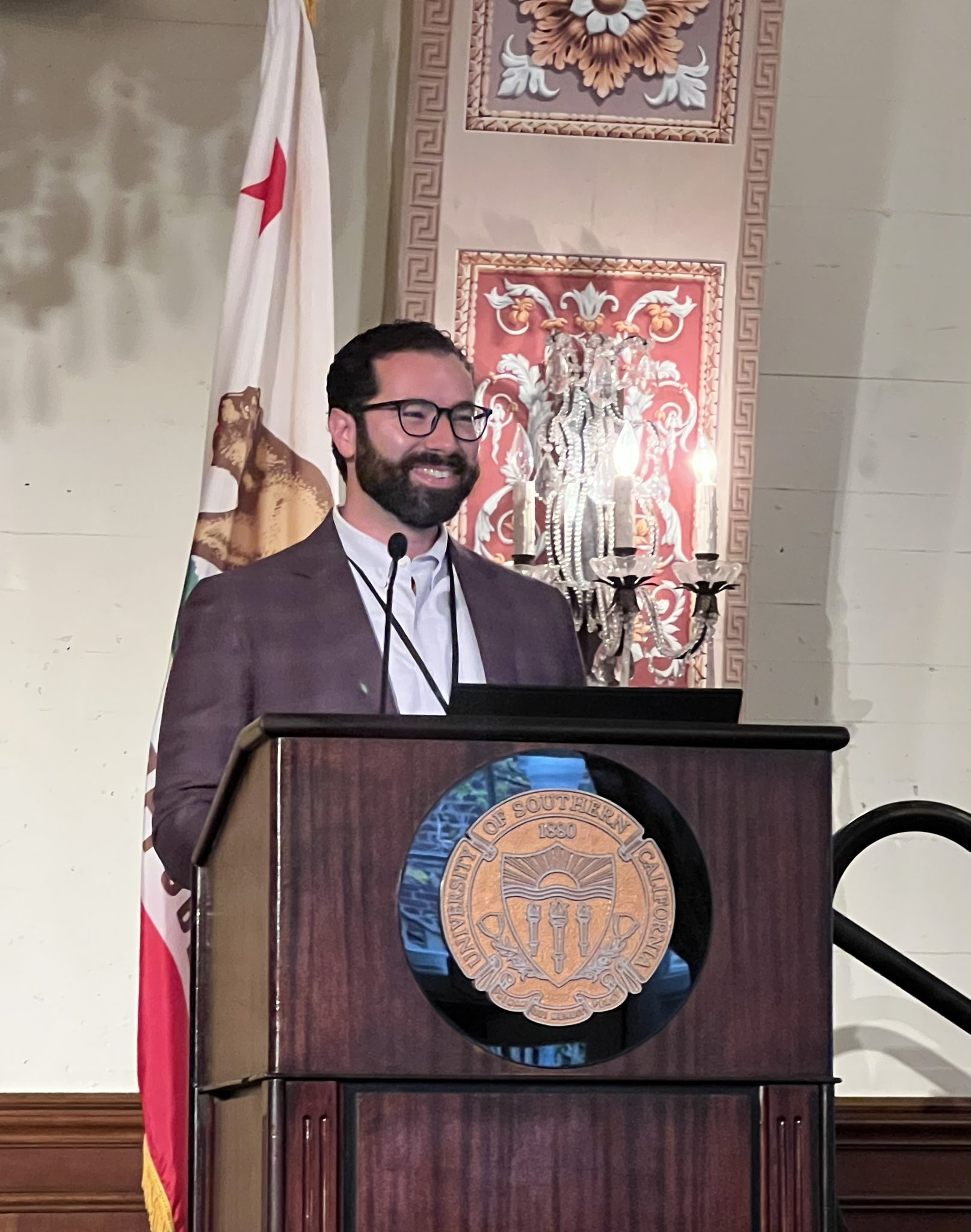
- Padula in 2023
- Born: William Vincent Padula III

Academic background
- Education: Northwestern University; Dartmouth College; University of Colorado Anschutz; University of Chicago
- Influences: David Meltzer; Peter Pronovost

Academic work
- Discipline: Health economics
- Institutions: University of Southern California

William Padula (born 1984) is a professor of pharmaceutical and health economics at the University of Southern California. He is a fellow in the Leonard D. Schaeffer Center for Health Policy & Economics. He is a co-founder and principal for Stage Analytics. From 2021 to 2022, he was the President and chief executive officer of the National Pressure Injury Advisory Panel.

Padula has research interests in the economics of patient safety and health technology assessment. Specifically, he has published papers that explore the value of vaccines, the economics of pressure ulcer prevention, and developed legislation on drug pricing. In addition, he has served as lead health economist on a number of high-profile cases related to the opioid crisis. He is a past winner of the annual Bernie J. O'Brien Award in health economics from the International Society for PharmacoEconomics & Outcomes Research, and the Thomas Stewart Founders Award for excellence in public policy.

== Education ==
William Padula grew up in Killingworth, Connecticut and attended Haddam-Killingworth High School. He went to college at Northwestern University in Evanston, Illinois and majored in biochemical engineering.

After college he completed an M.S. degree in health policy and clinical practice at Dartmouth College. He earned a PhD in Pharmaceutical Economics from University of Colorado Anschutz. He developed his dissertation on the comparative effectiveness of quality improvement intervention to prevent pressure ulcers.

He went onto do a postdoctoral fellowship in health economics at University of Chicago with mentors David O. Meltzer and Robert Gibbons; while there, Padula completed an M.S. in Analytics.

== Career ==
He began his career as a professor in the Department of Health Policy & Management at Johns Hopkins University. In 2018, he moved to University of Southern California. He has amounted a number of important contributions in the areas of medicine and health economics.

=== Drug Price Legislation ===
Padula, in collaboration with Hopkins colleagues Jerry Anderson, Jeremy Greene, and Vincent DeMarco drafted legislation to place checks and balances on skyrocketing prices of pharmaceuticals. This policy, known as Maryland's Anti-Price-Gouging Law was an effort to prevent bad actors such as Martin Shkreli from arbitrarily raising the prices of drugs without consideration for consumer affordability. The Anti-Price-Gouging legislation was passed bipartisan by the State of Maryland in April, 2017, and Padula and Greene published a correspondence on the legislation in the New England Journal of Medicine. This legislation would set the stage for the later introduction of the Maryland Prescription Drug Affordability Board. Padula was later recognized for these contributions with the Award for Excellence in U.S. Public Health Practice from the Johns Hopkins Bloomberg School of Public Health.

=== Hospital Patient Safety ===
In 2019, Padula and Joyce Black authored the Standardized Pressure Injury Prevention Protocol checklist, which was the first derivative of the International Guideline for pressure ulcer prevention that could be implemented simply at the bedside.

Padula served as president and chief executive officer of the National Pressure Injury Advisory Panel from 2021 to 2022. During which time he helped introduce the concept of a Standardized Pressure Injury Prevention Protocol checklist to United States Congress, which later passed legislation updating the Military Construction and Veterans Affairs and Related Agencies Appropriations Act, 2015 (H.R. 4355) to establish the checklist as law that United States Department of Veterans Affairs facilities should adhere to in order to keep patients safe from harm.

=== Defects in Value ===
In 2022, Padula and Peter Pronovost introduced the application of health technology assessment to calculate defects in value for specialty care in the U.S. health system. This work calculated that compared to the $1.4 trillion spent on defects in value, it would only cost 20% on quality improvement through centers of excellence to eliminate these defects.

=== Vaccine Economics ===
He has long advocated the cost-effectiveness of vaccines as efficient solutions to reduce disease burden. He has taught vaccine economics courses with grants from the Bill & Melinda Gates Foundation since 2017 in Africa, Southeast Asia, Europe and North America. In 2023, Padula, along with colleagues David Bishai and Logan Brenzel, published the first textbook on vaccine economics through Oxford University Press, which is the first open-access textbook it published with support from the foundation.

== Personal ==
Padula resides in Rancho Palos Verdes, California with his wife, Stephanie.
