= David Meltzer =

David Meltzer may refer to:

- David Meltzer (poet) (1937–2016), American poet
- David J. Meltzer (born 1955), American archaeologist
- David O. Meltzer (born 1964), American medical professor
- Dave Meltzer (born 1959), American journalist
