= Eve Ewing =

American writer, artist and academic

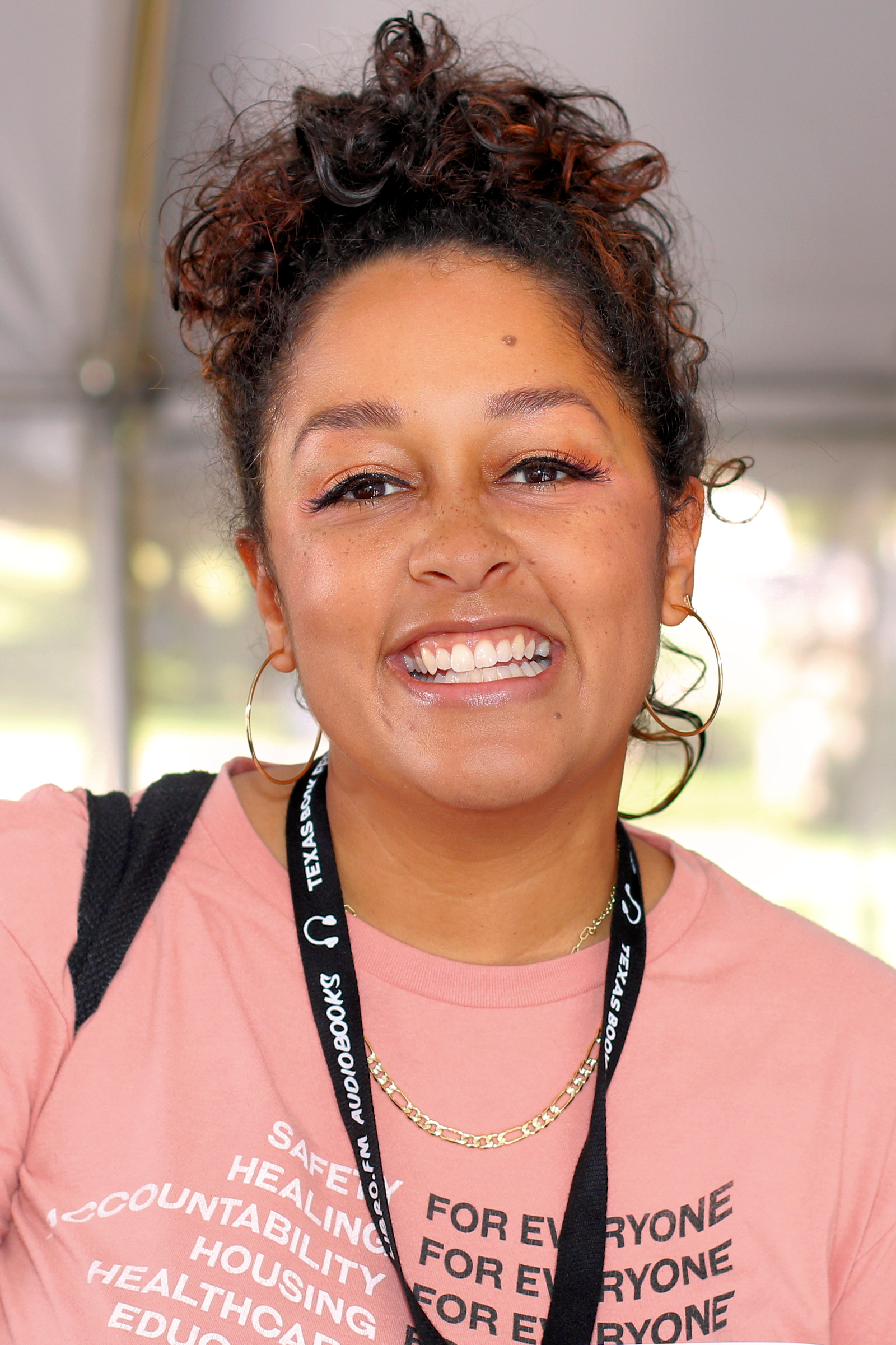
- Eve Ewing at the 2025 Texas Book Festival
- Born: Eve Louise Ewing; 1986 (age 39–40)
- Spouse: Damon Jones

Academic background
- Education: University of Chicago; Dominican University, Illinois; Harvard University

Academic work
- Discipline: Sociologist
- Institutions: University of Chicago
- Notable works: Electric Arches (2017); Ghosts in the Schoolyard (2018); Ironheart (2018)
- Website: eveewing.com

Eve Louise Ewing (born 1986) is an American sociologist, author, poet, and visual artist from Chicago, Illinois. Ewing is an associate professor at the University of Chicago. Her academic research in the sociology of education includes her 2018 book, Ghosts in the Schoolyard: Racism and School Closings on Chicago's South Side, a study of school closures in Chicago. She is the former editor at Seven Scribes and the author of the poetry collection Electric Arches, which was released in September 2017. In 2019, she published 1919, a poetry collection centered around the Chicago race riot of 1919. Additionally, Ewing is the author of the Ironheart comic book series for Marvel.

== Early life and education ==
Ewing grew up in the Logan Square neighborhood of Chicago. Her mother worked as a radio reporter and producer and her father as an artist. Ewing attended Northside College Preparatory High School. She was a part of Young Chicago Authors.

Ewing attended the University of Chicago, where she received an undergraduate degree in English with a focus on African-American literature of the twentieth century. She earned a Master of Arts in primary education from Dominican University and taught middle school English in Chicago Public Schools before attending Harvard University, where she earned a Masters of Education in education policy and management (2013), then a doctorate from Harvard Graduate School of Education (2016). At Harvard, Ewing served as editor and co-chair of the Harvard Educational Review.

== Career ==
Ewing was a Provost's Postdoctoral Scholar at the University of Chicago, then became an assistant professor in the Crown Family School of Social Work, Policy, and Practice from 2018 to 2022. As of 2023, she is an associate professor in the Department of Race, Diaspora, and Indigeneity. She also is on the UChicago Committee on Education.

Ewing co-created and runs the Emerging Poets Incubator and Chicago Poetry Block Party. She also teaches with the Prison + Neighborhood Art Project, a visual arts and humanities project that connects teaching artists and scholars to men at Stateville Correctional Center. She is also on the board of directors of the nonprofit MassLEAP, which builds and supports spaces for artist-educators and organizers to foster positive youth development through spoken-word poetry forums throughout Massachusetts.

Ewing is also one of the most popular sociologists on Twitter. Her Twitter account, operated as "Wikipedia Brown", drew 30 million views a month as of September 2017.

=== Scholarship ===
Much of Ewing's academic research has focused on school closures. Her Harvard doctoral dissertation was on school closures in Chicago, entitled Shuttered Schools in the Black Metropolis: Race, History, and Discourse on Chicago's South Side. It served as the basis for her book Ghosts in the Schoolyard: Racism and School Closings on Chicago's South Side, which was published in 2018 by the University of Chicago Press.

Ghosts in the Schoolyard examines the demise of public schools in Chicago's Bronzeville district after the demolition of public housing, and analyzes community efforts to keep the schools open, including a community-wide hunger strike. In the book, Ewing introduces a concept she calls "institutional mourning," which refers to the multiple negative impacts experienced by the residents of areas where schools have been closed. According to The Chicago Reader, "she finds that school closures are a form of publicly sanctioned violence that not only derails black children's futures but also erases a community's past."

Ewing's work became especially pertinent during the COVID-19 pandemic. Ewing studied the impact of neighborhood, race, and socio-economics on student access to counselors and therapists, as well as their experiences with illnesses and deaths.

=== Writing ===
Ewing's writing includes poetry, prose and journalism, in addition to her academic scholarship. She has been a Pushcart Prize nominee and a finalist for Pamet River Prize for a first or second full-length book of poetry or prose by a woman or genderqueer author. ProPublica named her Seven Scribes article on the fight to save Chicago State University to its list of "The Best MuckReads on America's Troubled History With Race". Writing for The Huffington Post, Zeba Blay named Ewing's essay on Joshua Beal's death to a list of "30 Of The Most Important Articles By People Of Color In 2016". For NPR, Gene Demby praised Ewing's "moving essay [...] about the fight over the future of Dyett High in Chicago." In Chicago Magazine in 2017, Adam Morgan described her as one of the city's "most visible cultural icons." Ewing is a contributor to the 2019 anthology New Daughters of Africa, edited by Margaret Busby.

Ewing has also drawn notice for her commentary on subjects like colorism, school choice, structural racism, federal arts funding, Frank Ocean and Harper Lee, and race in publishing and in visual culture.

Much of Ewing's poetry covers similar topics as her scholarly work, such as the Black experience. For example, she discusses Black feminism through The Exodus in Electric Arches. Her poetry has been published in many venues, including Poetry, The New Yorker, The Atlantic, The Nation, The New Republic, and the anthology The Breakbeat Poets: New American Poetry in the Age of Hip-Hop.

Ewing serves on the editorial board for In These Times, as co-director of arts organization Crescendo Literary, and as co-founder of the Echo Hotel poetry collective with Hanif Abdurraqib.

==== Electric Arches ====
Ewing's first book, a collection of poetry, prose, and visual art entitled Electric Arches, was published by Haymarket Books on September 12, 2017. Ewing has stated the entire book is based on real-life incidents that have happened to her.

Publishers Weekly named Electric Arches one of its most anticipated books of the fall of 2017, calling it a "stunning debut." The Paris Review selected Electric Arches as a staff pick for the week on September 1, 2017, noting Ewing writes "trenchantly and tenderly" with "conversational [...] verse lulling the reader into territory that feels familiar, even when it isn't." Writing for the Pacific Standard, Elizabeth King described Electric Arches as "at once a portrait of [Ewing's Chicago] home, a tender letter to black youth, and a call to her audience to think beyond the confines of systemic racism." The book won a 2018 Alex Award from the Young Adult Library Services Association, the Chicago Review of Books 2017 poetry award, and the Poetry Society of America's Norma Farber First Book Award.

==== 1919 ====
1919 is a collection of poems and children's songs based on the stoning and drowning of Eugene Williams in Lake Michigan and the ensuing Chicago race riot of 1919. 1919 includes excerpts from "The Negro In Chicago: A Study On Race Relations And A Race Riot", a text commissioned by the city of Chicago and written in the aftermath of the riots as an attempt to understand how and why it occurred and what could be done to ensure that race riots would never again occur. She explores historical denialism and critiques the criminalization of Black aspiration.

The poems speak to the ways African-American communities have been systematically erased and targeted. The book suggests that official historical narratives erase the contributions and pain of Black Americans. Ewing portrays a society that "builds monuments to forgetting, and calls it progress," as institutions prioritize erasure over accountability. 1919 was published in 2019 and was selected on NPR's Best Books of 2019, on the Chicago Tribune's Notable Books of 2019, as Chicago Review of Books' Best Poetry Book of 2019, on O Magazine's Best Books by Women of Summer 2019, on The Millions' Must-Read Poetry of June 2019, and on Literary Hub's Most Anticipated Reads of Summer 2019.

==== Children's books ====
In 2021, Penguin Random House published Maya and the Robot, written by Ewing and illustrated by Christine Almeda. It tells the story of an introverted fifth grader who finds a robot named Ralph, who helps her adapt to being in a classroom without her best friends.

In 2023, Ewing co-wrote the young adult graphic memoir Colin Kaepernick: Change the Game with Colin Kaepernick.

==== Comics ====
Ewing was the writer of the Marvel series Ironheart, the first issue of which was published November 2018. She has also written for Ms. Marvel, Marvel Team-Up, Champions, and Monica Rambeau. In 2023, she became the first Black female author of the Black Panther series. In 2024, she became the writer of Exceptional X-Men, one of the three core titles of the X-Men: From the Ashes initiative.

==== Theater ====
In 2019, Manual Cinema premiered No Blue Memories: The Life of Gwendolyn Brooks by Crescendo Literary, made up of Ewing and Nate Marshall. This play was commissioned by the Poetry Foundation in honor of Gwendolyn Brooks' centennial.

=== Visual art ===
In 2015, Ewing became the inaugural Artist-in-Residence at the Boston Children's Museum. Her installation "A Map Home" was themed around place and childhood exploration. The project became the subject of a short film by Rene Dongo and an episode of Coorain Lee's webseries, Coloring Coorain!

Ewing has also served as program and communications manager at the Urbano Project, a youth arts and activism project in Boston, Massachusetts.

=== Podcast ===
Ewing launched a podcast called Bughouse Square in October 2018. Using archival footage of oral historian Studs Terkel in the beginning of each episode, Ewing then interviews a guest in a conversation with parallel themes. According to BroadwayWorld, "compelling guest commentary and host insights bring to life the most provocative and compelling topics from Terkel's day and ours."

== Personal life ==
Ewing is married to Damon Jones, an associate professor at the Harris School of Public Policy.

== Awards and recognition ==
- 2017 Distinguished Dissertation Award, American Educational Research Association
- 2019 Twenty-First Century Award, Chicago Public Library Foundation
- 2020 Black Excellence Award for Literature, African American Arts Alliance
- 2020 Paul Engle Prize, Iowa City Book Festival
- 2020 Distinguished Early Career Award, American Sociological Association Section on Children & Youth
- 2023 Nicolás Cristóbal Guillén Batista Outstanding Activist Intellectual and Scholar Award, Caribbean Philosophical Association

=== Recognition for Electric Arches ===
- 2017 Best Poetry Book, Chicago Review of Books
- 2018 Alex Award, Young Adult Library Services Association
- 2018 Norma Farber First Book Award

=== Recognition for 1919 ===
- 2019 Best Poetry Book of 2019, Chicago Review of Books
- 2020 Best Poetry Book, Black Caucus of the American Library Association

=== Recognition for Ghosts in the Schoolyard ===
- 2018 CHIRBy Award for Nonfiction, Chicago Review of Books
- 2020 Erickson and Hornberger Outstanding Book Award, University of Pennsylvania

=== Recognition for Original Sins ===
- 2025 CHIRBy award for Nonfiction, Chicago Review of Books

== Bibliography ==
=== Books ===
- Electric Arches (2017)
- 1919 (2019)
- Ghosts in the Schoolyard: Racism and School Closings on Chicago's South Side (2019)
- Maya and the Robot (2021)
- Change the Game (with Colin Kaepernick and Orlando Caicedo, 2023)
- Original Sins: The (Mis)education of Black and Native Children and the Construction of American Racism (2025)

=== Marvel Comics ===
- Avengers Unlimited Infinity Comic #39-42 (2023)
- Black Panther Vol. 9 #1-10 (2023–2024)
- Champions Vol. 4 #1-5 (2020–2021)
- Exceptional X-Men #1-13 (2024–2025)
- Expatriate X-Men #1-3 (2025)
- Ironheart #1-12 (2018–2019)
- Ms. Marvel Vol. 4 #38 (2019)
- Ms. Marvel Team-Up #1 (2019)
- Marvel Team-Up #2-3 (2019)
- Marvel Comics #1000, short story "Over Troubled Waters" (2019)
- Monica Rambeau: Photon #1-5 (2022–2023)
- Outlawed #1 (2020)
- X-Men United #1-present (2026–present)
