= Damon Jones (economist) =

American economist

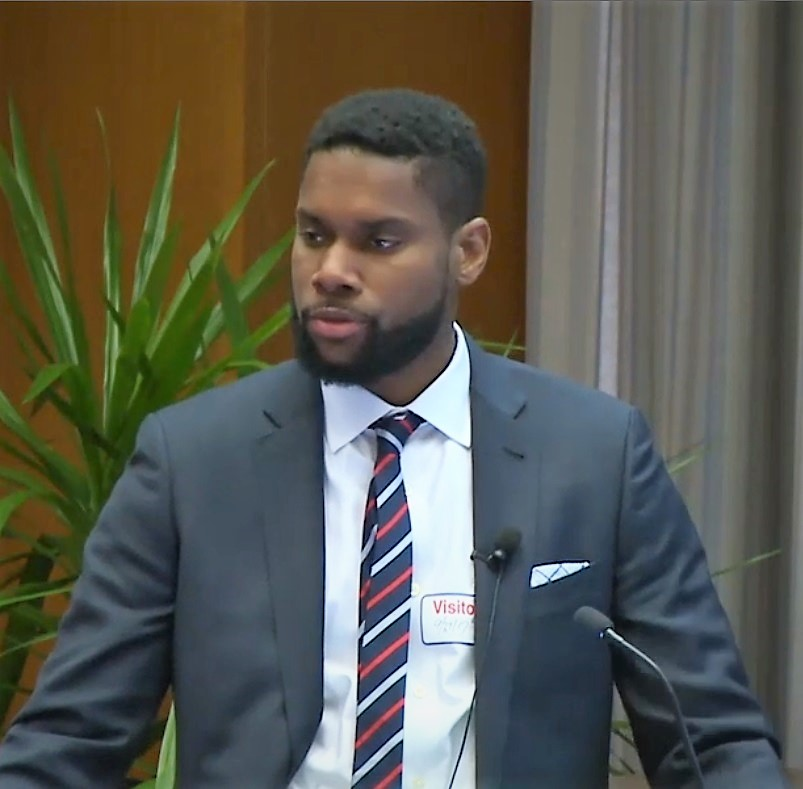
- Jones in 2017
- Born: Arthur-Damon M Jones
- Education: University of California, Berkeley (PhD), Stanford University (BA)
- Spouse: Eve Ewing
- Scientific career
- Workplaces: University of Chicago; Stanford Institute for Economic Policy Research
- Thesis: Essays on taxation, transfers and consumption smoothing (2009)

Damon Jones is an American economist and associate professor at the Harris School of Public Policy in the University of Chicago. Alongside his academic research, Jones is a popular science communicator and regularly provides expert commentary on issues related to economics and public policy. During the COVID-19 pandemic he investigated the disproportionate impact of coronavirus disease on communities of color, and delivered evidence on his findings before the United States House Committee on the Budget.

== Education ==
As a high school student, Jones was selected as a Du Bois Scholar. He studied public policy at Stanford University, where he minored in African-American studies. He moved to the University of California, Berkeley, for his graduate studies, where he specialized in economics and worked alongside Emmanuel Saez. After earning his doctoral degree, Jones returned to Stanford, joining the Stanford Institute for Economic Policy Research as a Searle Freedom Trust Postdoctoral Scholar. During this time he held an affiliate research position at the University of Wisconsin–Madison Institute for Research on Poverty.

== Research and career ==
After completing his postdoctoral fellowship in 2010, Jones joined the faculty at the Harris School of Public Policy. He holds a Faculty Research Fellowship at the National Bureau of Economic Research. Jones specializes in three areas of economics: public finance, household finance, and behavioral economics.

Jones' early work considered income tax and household finance in low-income households. He called for a revamping of the earned income tax credit, learning from the Working Tax Credit scheme in the United Kingdom and delivering payments in a more timely manner. Jones has also investigated the employment decisions of older Americans, and evaluated the impact of the Social Security Annual Earnings Test (AET). The AET reduces the benefits of claimants in proportion to the amount of money they earn in excess of a certain amount. Jones previously served on the Chicago Resilient Families Task Force, which was funded by the Economic Security Project and proposed cash transfer to low-income families. The program was based on Jones' research which had identified that cash transfers can immediately improve well-being, and do not result in people leaving the workforce.

As a fan of college sports, Jones became interested in the economics of student athletes, and has argued that they should be both paid and unionized. Jones has investigated the racial wealth gap in the United States, showing that not only do Black households have less wealth than their white counterparts, but they are more likely to be unemployed and less likely to access unemployment benefits.

Jones is part of the Innovations for Poverty Action research program, which looks at ways to support teachers who are struggling with their finances. Teacher turnover is high in the United States, particularly in schools that serve low-income families, and it may be related to their student loan debt. Federal debt relief programs may offer some respite, but they are not frequently used, and Jones posited that personalized interventions might help.

In 2020, Jones was awarded an National Institute for Health Care Management research award to investigate workplace wellness programs. He is principal investigator of the Illinois Workplace Wellness Study, a randomized controlled trial that looks to evaluate the effects of financial incentives on employee participation in workplace wellness programs.

During the COVID-19 pandemic, Jones investigated why communities of color were the hardest hit. He showed that persistent racial inequality mean that shocks to income affect Black and Hispanic households more strongly than white ones. In June 2020 Jones delivered evidence before the United States House Committee on the Budget that the COVID-19 pandemic in the United States would disproportionately impact those with low levels of financial stability.

In November 2020, Jones was named a volunteer member of the Joe Biden presidential transition Agency Review Team to support transition efforts related to the Council of Economic Advisers.

Jones has called for more diversity within economics, particularly for increasing the representation of Black economists. He serves on the Board of Trustees of the W. E. B. Du Bois Scholars Institute, which looks to support high school students from communities who have historically experienced barriers to opportunity.

In 2024 he was elected to the executive committee of the American Economic Association, joining it in 2025.

== Personal life ==
Jones is married to Eve Ewing, an American poet, sociologist, and visual artist.

== Selected publications ==
- Gelber, Alexander M.; Jones, Damon; Sacks, Daniel W. (2020). "Estimating Adjustment Frictions Using Nonlinear Budget Sets: Method and Evidence from the Earnings Test". American Economic Journal: Applied Economics. 12 (1): 1–31. doi:10.1257/app.20170717. ISSN 1945-7782. S2CID 210940099.
- Jones, Damon; Molitor, David; Reif, Julian (November 1, 2019). "What do Workplace Wellness Programs do? Evidence from the Illinois Workplace Wellness Study". The Quarterly Journal of Economics. 134 (4): 1747–1791. doi:10.1093/qje/qjz023. ISSN 0033-5533. PMC 6756192. PMID 31564754.
- Jones, Damon; Marinescu, Ioana (2018). "The Labor Market Impacts of Universal and Permanent Cash Transfers: Evidence from the Alaska Permanent Fund". National Bureau of Economic Research. Working Paper Series. doi:10.3386/w24312.
- Jones, Damon (February 2012). "Inertia and Overwithholding: Explaining the Prevalence of Income Tax Refunds". American Economic Journal: Economic Policy. 4 (1): 158–185. doi:10.1257/pol.4.1.158. ISSN 1945-7731.
