= Ariel Kalil =

American behavioral economist and academic

- Born: July 18, 1969 (age 57); Madison, Wisconsin, US

Academic background
- Education: University of Michigan (PhD); University of Colorado (MA); University of Wisconsin (BA)
- Doctoral advisor: Greg Duncan; Sheldon Danziger

Academic work
- Discipline: Behavioral economics, developmental psychology
- Institutions: University of Chicago; Harris School of Public Policy

Ariel Kalil (born July 18, 1969) is a behavioral economist and developmental psychologist at the University of Chicago Harris School of Public Policy, currently serving as the director of the Center for Human Potential and Public Policy. She studies economic conditions, parenting, and child development. She is an expert in using tools from behavioral economics to influence parenting behavior. Her work has been featured in The New York Times, Slate, and The Washington Post. Along with the Harris School's former dean Susan Mayer, Kalil is the co-director of the Behavioral Insights in Parenting Lab.

== Education ==
Kalil received a bachelor's degree from the University of Wisconsin–Madison in 1991, and an MA from the University of Colorado Boulder in 1993. She then completed her Ph.D. in developmental psychology from the University of Michigan in 1996, followed by a postdoc at the same institution.

== Career ==
Kalil was hired as an assistant professor at the University of Chicago in 1999. She was promoted to associate professor (with tenure) in 2004, and full professor in 2009. Kalil has also received the following awards:

- William T. Grant Foundation Faculty Scholars Award
- Changing Faces of America's Children Young Scholars Award
- Society for Research in Child Development (SRCD) Award for Early Research Contributions (inaugural recipient, 2003)

Kalil is also a contributor to Brookings, Education Next, and Behavioral Scientist. She was previously a board member of the Panel Study of Income Dynamics while at Michigan.
