= Thomas H. Connell III =

Stage manager (1942–2010)

- Born: 25 October 1942
- Died: 18 April 2010 (aged 67); Manhattan
- Education: Columbia University
- Occupation: Stage manager
- Employer: Metropolitan Opera (1977–)

Thomas Hilbert Connell III (October 25, 1942 – April 18, 2010) was a longtime chief stage manager at the Metropolitan Opera.

== Biography ==
Connell was born on October 25, 1942, in Ann Arbor, Michigan, and grew up in Westport, Connecticut. He was a singer, pianist and violist in high school, and was inspired by a class trip to the Met's La Bohème to enter the opera industry.

Connell earned his bachelor's degree in English and Comparative Literature from Columbia University. He served in the military during the Vietnam War, flying Navy transport planes. He later did graduate work in music at University of Hawaiʻi.

Connell staged managed operas in graduate school and worked for a few regional opera companies before joining the Met as stage manager in 1977. From 1981 until his death, he was the company's chief stage manager, also known as the production stage manager.

Connell died on April 18, 2010, at his home in Manhattan.

== Personal life ==
Connell's first marriage to Katherine Snyder ended in divorce. He then married writer and Ogilvy & Mather executive Stephanie Pierson, a marriage also ended in divorce. He had two daughters, one from each marriage, and his second daughter, Phoebe Connell, is married to Jacob Danziger, a son of Russell Sage Foundation President Sheldon Danziger.
