= Ioana Marinescu =

Romanian economist

Ioana Elena Marinescu
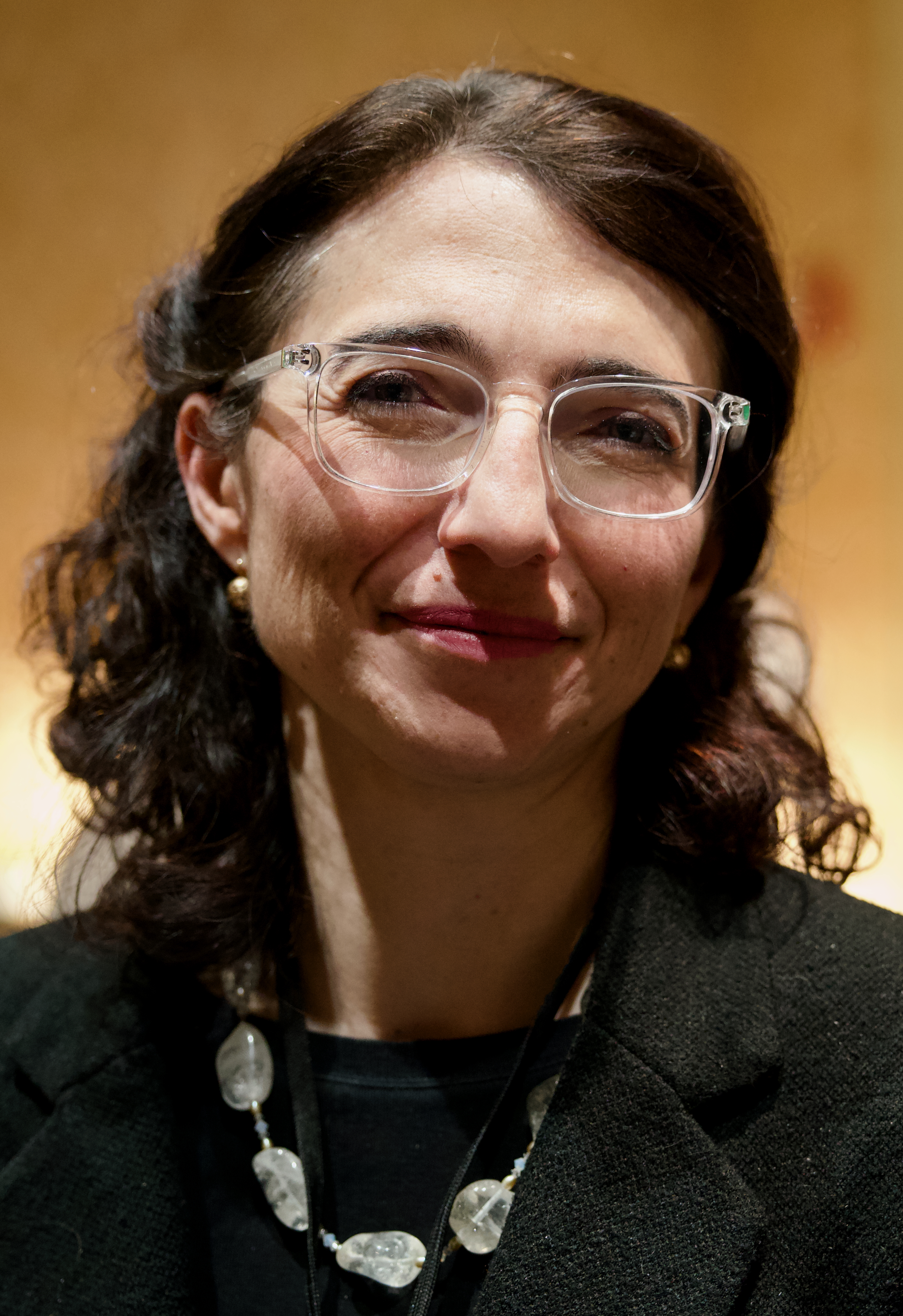
- Marinescu at ASSA 2026
- Born: May 21, 1979 (age 47); Bucharest, Romania
- Citizenship: American, French, Romanian
- Education: London School of Economics; School for Advanced Studies in the Social Sciences, Paris; University of Paris 1 Pantheon-Sorbonne
- Known for: study of monopsony in labor markets
- Spouse: Konrad Körding
- Children: 3
- Scientific career
- Fields: Economics
- Workplaces: School of Social Policy and Practice; Harris School of Public Policy, University of Chicago
- Thesis: The economics of unfair dismissal in the United Kingdom, and other topics in public policy (2007)
- Doctoral advisors: Thomas Piketty; Stephen Nickell; Alan Manning
- Website: http://www.marinescu.eu/

Ioana Elena Marinescu is an associate professor of public policy at the University of Pennsylvania School of Social Policy and Practice, a faculty research fellow at the National Bureau of Economic Research, and a columnist for Libération, whose research is widely covered in the popular media.

== Life and education ==
Born in Romania, Marinescu completed a PhD in 2005 at the School for Advanced Studies in the Social Sciences (EHESS) in Paris, and a second PhD in 2007 at the London School of Economics. Her latter thesis, from LSE, was titled The economics of unfair dismissal in the United Kingdom, and other topics in public policy. She was an assistant professor at the Harris School of Public Policy in Chicago from 2007 to 2017. She became a U.S. citizen in 2021.

== Research ==
Marinescu's research focuses on labor markets, including online job search, competition in the labor market, universal basic income, unemployment insurance, the minimum wage, and employment contracts.

Marinescu has testified on competition in labor markets before the US House Judiciary Committee, the United States Department of Justice Antitrust Division, and the U.S. Federal Trade Commission. She advocates for increased scrutiny of mergers with respect to their labor market implications.

=== Selected works ===
- Aghion, Philippe, Stephen Bond, Alexander Klemm, and Ioana Marinescu. "Technology and financial structure: are innovative firms different?." Journal of the European Economic Association 2, no. 2-3 (2004): 277–288.
- Marinescu, Ioana. "The general equilibrium impacts of unemployment insurance: Evidence from a large online job board." Journal of Public Economics 150 (2017): 14–29.
- Marinescu, Ioana. "Are judges sensitive to economic conditions? Evidence from UK employment tribunals." ILR Review 64, no. 4 (2011): 673–698.
- Azar, José, Ioana Marinescu, and Marshall I. Steinbaum. Labor market concentration. No. w24147. National Bureau of Economic Research, 2017.
- Marinescu, Ioana, and Roland Rathelot. "Mismatch unemployment and the geography of job search." American Economic Journal: Macroeconomics 10, no. 3 (2018): 42–70.
