= Konrad Körding =

German neuroscientist

Konrad P. Körding
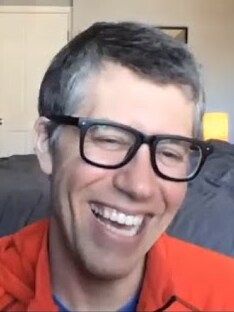
- Born: c. 1973 (age 52–53); Darmstadt, Hesse
- Education: ETH Zurich
- Spouse: Ioana Marinescu
- Scientific career
- Fields: Neuroscience
- Workplaces: Northwestern University, University of Pennsylvania
- Thesis: Optimization and Learning : from Microscopic Cell Properties to Natural Videos (2001)
- Doctoral advisor: Peter Konig

Konrad Paul Körding (born 1973) is a German neuroscience professor at the University of Pennsylvania and co-founder of Neuromatch and the Community for Rigor. He is known for his contributions to the fields of motor control, neural data methods, and computational neuroscience, as well as his advocacy and contribution to open science and scientific rigor.

== Biography ==
Kording obtained both a diploma degree and a PhD in physics at ETH Zurich in 1997 and 2001, respectively. He then worked as a postdoctoral fellow at the Collegium Helveticum in Zurich and at University College London, followed by a Heisenberg Fellow position at MIT. He joined the faculty at Northwestern University and the Rehabilitation Institute of Chicago where he was a professor of physical medicine and rehabilitation, physiology, and applied mathematics. In 2017, he joined the faculty at the University of Pennsylvania with joint appointments in the Department of Neuroscience and Department of Bioengineering.

== Scientific contributions ==
Konrad Kording's research combines experimental methods with the application of computational principles. The main principle of his work is the idea of normative models and in particular Bayesian statistics. Some of his most controversial work is work on predicting the future success of scientists, leading to a calculator predicting the h-index 10 years into the future. His experimental work addresses motor learning and motor control, relating these phenomena to Bayesian ideas. Most recently, he has focused on methods of analyzing neural data and methods for obtaining large neural datasets (see Brain Initiative). Kording is a frequent advocate of shifting research paradigms in neuroscience, publishing and co-authoring various letters, papers, and talks on the applications of deep learning in neuroscience.

In 2023, Kording was one of several prominent scientists leading calls to reverse engineer an entire nervous system.

== Science Education ==
After the COVID-19 pandemic shut down neuroscience summer schools and workshops worldwide in 2020, Kording co-founded Neuromatch, a non-profit organization focused on promoting equity in the sciences and advancing open science policies, alongside Megan Peters, Paul Schrater, Sean Escola, Athena Akrami, Kate Bonnen, Carsen Stringer, Brad Wyble, and Gunnar Blohm. The project started with Neuromatch Conference and later expanded to Neuromatch Academy and the Neuromatch Open Publishing journal. As an organization, Neuromatch has quickly risen to the forefront of the open science and remote learning movements, enjoying extensive news coverage in the wake of both its success and its efforts to obtain special permission from the US Office of Foreign Assets Control to teach students from Iran. Since 2020, Neuromatch has hosted annual conferences and workshops.

In 2021, Neuromatch Academy added a deep learning course in addition to its original computational neuroscience course. The school has taught over 10,000 students with the help of several hundred teaching assistants across its three iterations. Neuromatch Academy has been the subject of several papers exploring the educational efficacy and accessibility of its program.

== Open science ==
On September 27, 2022, Neuromatch posted an open letter to the White House Office of Science and Technology Policy making a number of policy suggestions that it argued would promote equity and open access in scientific research. Over 1,000 academic professionals from 33 countries and 240 universities signed the letter, including Yann LeCun, Michael Eisen, Peter Murray-Rust, Peter Suber, Timothy Behrens, Daniel Wolpert, Chris Bourg, Ila Fiete, and more.

That same month, Kording was awarded a grant by the National Institutes of Health to "develop a user-friendly, open-source educational platform of modules that address biases in research, logical fallacies around causality, hypothesis development, literature search design, identifying experimental variables, and reducing confounding variables in research." Kording's initiative, called the Community for Rigor, launched their website later the same year.

Kording has also published and co-authored papers on the subject of open data.
