= Peter Pronovost =

American physician

Peter J. Pronovost
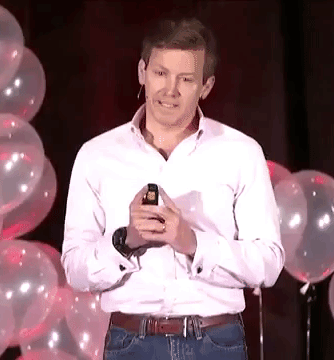
- Born: February 22, 1965 (age 61); Waterbury, Connecticut, U.S.
- Education: Fairfield University; Johns Hopkins University
- Known for: Intensive care checklist protocol
- Awards: 2008 Time 100; 2008 MacArthur Fellow
- Scientific career
- Fields: Anesthesiology; Critical Care Medicine; Patient safety
- Workplaces: University Hospitals Cleveland Medical Center, Johns Hopkins Hospital, Johns Hopkins School of Medicine, Johns Hopkins Bloomberg School of Public Health, Fairfield University

Peter J. Pronovost (born February 22, 1965) is Chief Quality and Transformation Officer at University Hospitals Cleveland Medical Center, the main affiliate of the Case Western Reserve University School of Medicine.

He previously served as an intensive care physician and director of the Armstrong Institute for Patient Safety at the Johns Hopkins Hospital in Baltimore, Maryland. At Johns Hopkins University, he was Professor in the Departments of Anesthesiology & Critical Care Medicine as well as Surgery, Professor of Healthcare Management at the Carey Business School, Professor of Health Policy and Management at the Johns Hopkins Bloomberg School of Public Health, and Medical Director of the Center for Innovation in Quality Patient Care.

He introduced an intensive care checklist protocol that during an 18-month period saved 1500 lives and $100 million in the State of Michigan. According to surgeon Atul Gawande in The New Yorker, Pronovost's "work has already saved more lives than that of any laboratory scientist in the past decade." In 2008 Time magazine named Pronovost among the 100 most influential people in the world. That same year, Pronovost was awarded a MacArthur Fellowship.

Pronovost's book Safe Patients, Smart Hospitals: How One Doctor's Checklist Can Help Us Change Health Care from the Inside Out was released in February 2010.

== Early life and education ==
Pronovost grew up in Waterbury, Connecticut. His parents were an elementary school teacher and a math professor. He received his B.S. from Fairfield University, M.D. from the Johns Hopkins School of Medicine, and Ph.D. in Clinical Investigation from the Johns Hopkins Bloomberg School of Public Health. In his Ph.D. thesis, he documented that in intensive-care units in Maryland, an intensive care specialist on the staff reduced death rates by a third.

== Work ==
External videos
- 2008 MacArthur Fellow: Peter Pronovost, MacArthur Foundation on YouTube, 2:14
- Believing and Belonging - Peter Pronovost - TEDx Beacon Street Salon, TEDx on YouTube, 14:01
- Pronovost checklist, CurrentMedicine.TV on YouTube, 11:40
- The Patient Promise, Peter Pronovost, 7:31, Johns Hopkins Medicine

In 2003 he founded the Quality and Safety Research Group. Pronovost has published over 800 articles and chapters on patient safety and advises the World Health Organization on improving patient safety through WHO's World Alliance for Patient Safety.

He started studying hospital-acquired infections in 2001, concluding that a simple 5 item check-list protocol would greatly reduce infections when inserting a central venous catheter;

Doctors should:

1. Wash their hands with soap.
2. Clean the patient's skin with chlorhexidine antiseptic.
3. Put sterile drapes over the entire patient.
4. Wear a sterile mask, hat, gown and gloves.
5. Put a sterile dressing over the catheter site.

In the Keystone Initiative, a 2003 study by a collection of Michigan hospitals and health organizations, the median rate of infections at a typical ICU dropped from 2.7 per 1,000 patients to zero after three months. The Keystone Initiative published its results in the December, 2006 New England Journal of Medicine. In the first three months of the project, the infection rate in Michigan's ICUs decreased by sixty-six per cent. In the Initiative's first eighteen months, they estimated that 1500 lives and $100 million were saved. These results were sustained for almost four years.

Several reasons may explain why a simple checklist protocol is not more widely adapted:

- Many physicians do not like being monitored by nurses or otherwise being forced to follow a checklist;
- A wish to avoid standardized tasks and bureaucracy; and
- A focus by researchers on "more exciting" issues such as disease biology and new treatment therapies.

According to Pronovost,

The fundamental problem with the quality of American medicine is that we've failed to view delivery of health care as a science. The tasks of medical science fall into three buckets. One is understanding disease biology. One is finding effective therapies. And one is ensuring those therapies are delivered effectively. That third bucket has been almost totally ignored by research funders, government, and academia. It's viewed as the art of medicine. That's a mistake, a huge mistake. And from a taxpayer's perspective it's outrageous.

=== Recent work ===
In 2013, Pronovost co-founded Doctella, a startup that provides surgical checklists for patients to improve patient engagement, patient safety, and lead to better health outcomes.

Also in 2013, Pronovost advocated for a system of alcohol and drug testing for doctors in a Journal of the American Medical Association article.

He has participated in an online course, or MOOC, from Johns Hopkins provided via Coursera.

In January 2018, he announced that he would be taking a position at United HealthCare. Shortly after taking the position he was promoted to Chief Medical Officer. Within weeks of taking this position, his departure from the position and the company was confirmed, although no reason was given.

In October 2018, he joined University Hospitals as Chief Quality and Clinical Transformation Officer, adding value across the entire health system.

In 2020, Pronovost and colleagues at University Hospitals introduced an estimate that defects in value contribute to over $1 trillion in wasteful spending. Pronovost, along with William Padula, David Dietz and Hanke Zheng further developed the framework for specialty care to illustrate that by investing in centers of excellence, health systems would otherwise spend pennies on the dollar over wasteful spending on value defects.

== Honors ==
In 2008, he was named in Time magazine's 100 most influential people in the world, and was also named a MacArthur Fellow. In 2011, Pronovost was recognized for his outstanding professional achievement and commitment to service with election to membership in the Institute of Medicine, one of the highest honors in the fields of health and medicine. On March 28, 2013, he was named a Gilman Scholar at Johns Hopkins University.

== Personal life ==
Pronovost has two children. His wife, Marlene Miller, is Chair of Pediatrics as well as Pediatrician-in-Chief at University Hospitals Cleveland Medical Center.

== See also ==
- Evidence-based medicine
- Iatrogenesis
- Medical error
- Patient safety
