= Susan E. Mayer =

American academic administrator

Dean of the Harris School of Public Policy
- In office 2002–2009
- Preceded by: Don L. Coursey
- Succeeded by: Colm O'Muircheartaigh

Personal details
- Education: Northwestern University (PhD); Indiana University (BA, MA)

Academic work
- Discipline: Behavioral Economics; Sociology & Poverty
- Institutions: University of Chicago

Susan E. Mayer is a professor and former Dean of the University of Chicago's Harris School of Public Policy. She is a behavioral economist and sociologist who studies poverty and education. Her research examines the role of money in parenting outcomes. She was previously the director of Northwestern/Chicago's Joint Center on Poverty Research, and is currently the co-director of the Behavioral Insights in Parenting Lab with fellow University of Chicago professor Ariel Kalil. She served as the Dean of the Harris School of Public Policy from 2002 to 2009.

== Career ==
Mayer received a bachelor's degree in Sociology from Indiana University in 1974, and a master's degree in sociology from the same institution in 1981. She received a Ph.D. in sociology from Northwestern University in 1986. She began working at the Harris School of Public Policy as an assistant professor in 1986, and became its to Dean in 2002. Since stepping down from her role as the dean in 2009, she continues to serve as a research professor at the university.

Mayer's research has been cited in the New York Times and the Washington Post. Mayer has an honorary Doctor of Laws degreed conferred by Lake Forest College.

== Writing ==
In addition to numerous articles and book chapters, Mayer writes for the Behavioral Scientist. Mayer has served as the Associate Editor of the American Journal of Sociology, and has written the following books:

- What Money Can't Buy: Family Income and Children's Life Chances
- Coeditor of Earning and Learning: How Schools Matter (with P. Peterson)
