= Sheldon Danziger =

American economist (born 1948)

Sheldon H. Danziger
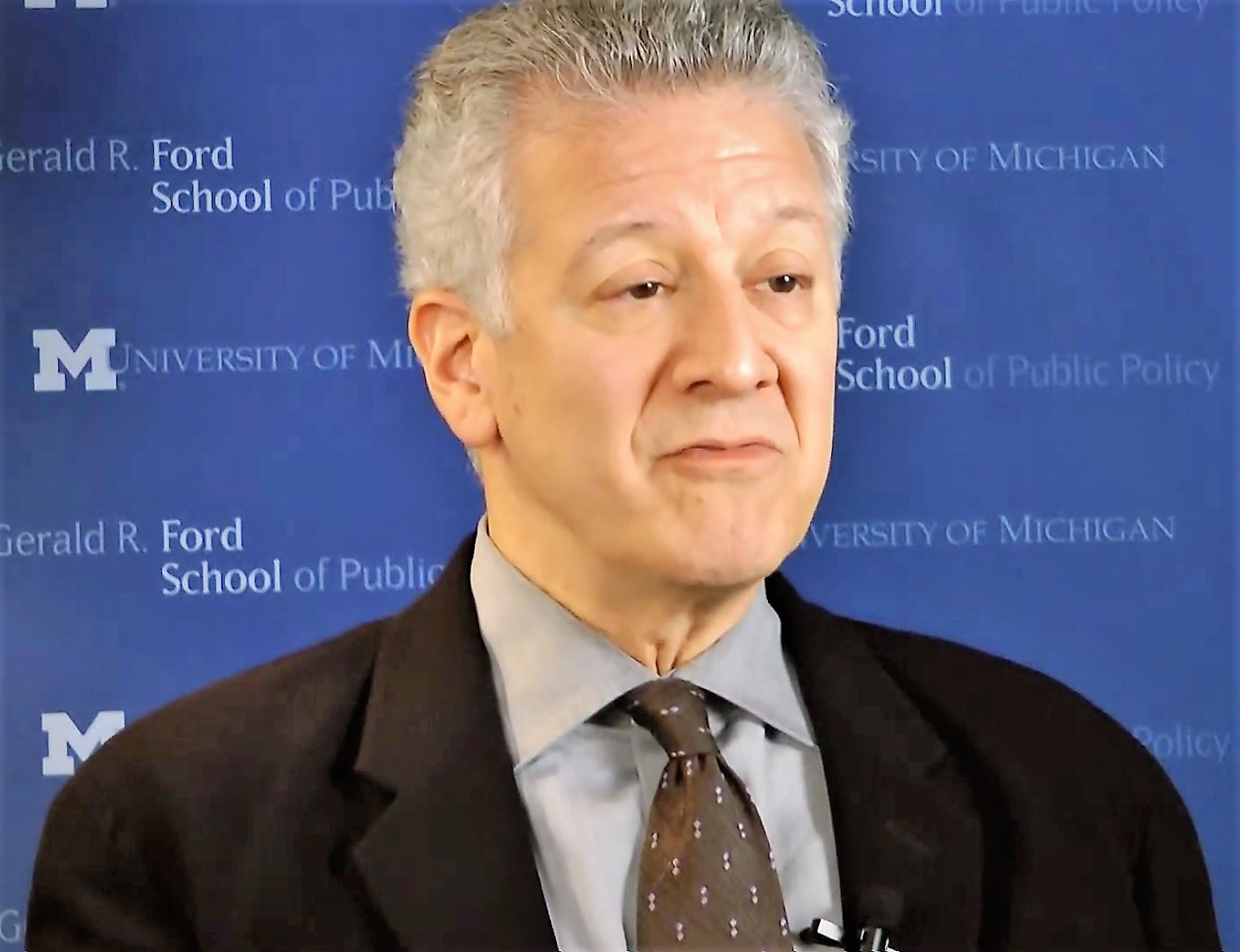
- Danziger speaks at the Gerald R. Ford School of Public Policy in 2012
- Born: September 30, 1948 (age 77)
- Education: Columbia University; Massachusetts Institute of Technology
- Scientific career
- Fields: Economics
- Workplaces: University of Michigan
- Doctoral students: Ariel Kalil

Sheldon H. Danziger (born September 30, 1948) is an American economist, focusing in trends in poverty and inequality, and the effects of economic and demographic changes and government social programs on disadvantaged groups, currently the Henry J. Meyer Distinguished University Professor Emeritus of Public Policy at University of Michigan and an Elected Fellow of the American Academy of Political and Social Science and American Academy of Arts and Sciences. He is also the President of Russell Sage Foundation.

He was the recipient of a Guggenheim Fellowship in 2008.

== Background ==
Danziger received his B.A. from Columbia University and his Ph.D. in economics from the Massachusetts Institute of Technology. He was on faculty at the University of Wisconsin-Madison as the Director of the Institute for Research on Poverty from 1983-1988 before joining the faculty at the University of Michigan in 1998.

== Writing ==
American Unequal (co-author, 1995)

Detroit Divided (co-author, 2000)

== Personal life and family ==
Danziger is married to Sandra K. Danziger, the Edith A Lewis Collegiate Professor of Social Work at the Gerald R. Ford School of Public Policy. His son, Jacob Danziger, is married to Phoebe Connell, daughter of longtime Metropolitan Opera chief stage manager Thomas H. Connell III.
