= Dan A. Black =

American economist and professor at the University of Chicago

- Born: February 18, 1955 (age 71)

Academic background
- Education: University of Kansas (B.A., 1977; M.A., 1979); Purdue University (M.S., 1981; Ph.D., 1983)

Academic work
- Discipline: Labor economics, econometrics
- Institutions: University of Chicago's Harris School of Public Policy
- Website: Information at IDEAS / RePEc

Dan A. Black (born February 18, 1955) is an American economist and professor at the University of Chicago Harris School of Public Policy, where he is also the deputy dean and director of Ph.D. programs. He is also the project director of the National Longitudinal Survey of Youth and a senior fellow at the National Opinion Research Center. Before joining the faculty of the University of Chicago, he taught at the University of Kentucky and Syracuse University.
