= Greg Duncan =

American economist

Greg J. Duncan
- Education: University of Michigan; Grinnell College
- Scientific career
- Fields: Economics; Psychology; Education
- Workplaces: University of California; University of Michigan; Northwestern University
- Doctoral students: Ariel Kalil

Greg J. Duncan is an American economist who is a Distinguished Professor of Education at University of California, Irvine and an Elected Fellow of the American Academy of Political and Social Science. He was the 2013 winner of the Jacobs Research Prize for his research on the long-term effects of childhood poverty, primarily through his 23 years with the Panel Study of Income Dynamics as researcher and director.

His research has had broad impacts on poverty, education, and housing policy and research. One paper with biologist collaborators uncovered a direct link between cash subsidies to poor mothers and high-frequency brain activity in their infants, supporting many of his influential papers on life-long sociological effects of childhood poverty. As of 2022, his 176 peer-reviewed articles had been cited in over 15,000 peer-reviewed articles, and 38 of his books (including coauthors such as Harvard University Professor Richard Murnane) and articles have been cited 500+ times. In 2022, he was in the top 1% of most cited researchers in Education, anchoring the UCI Graduate School of Education which was ranked eighth in the world.

== Honors ==
- American Academy of Arts and Sciences, 2001
- National Academy of Education, 2009
- National Academy of Sciences, 2010
- Population Association of America, President, 2008
- Society for Research in Child Development, President, 2009-2011
