= University of Chicago Harris School of Public Policy =

Public policy school of the University of Chicago

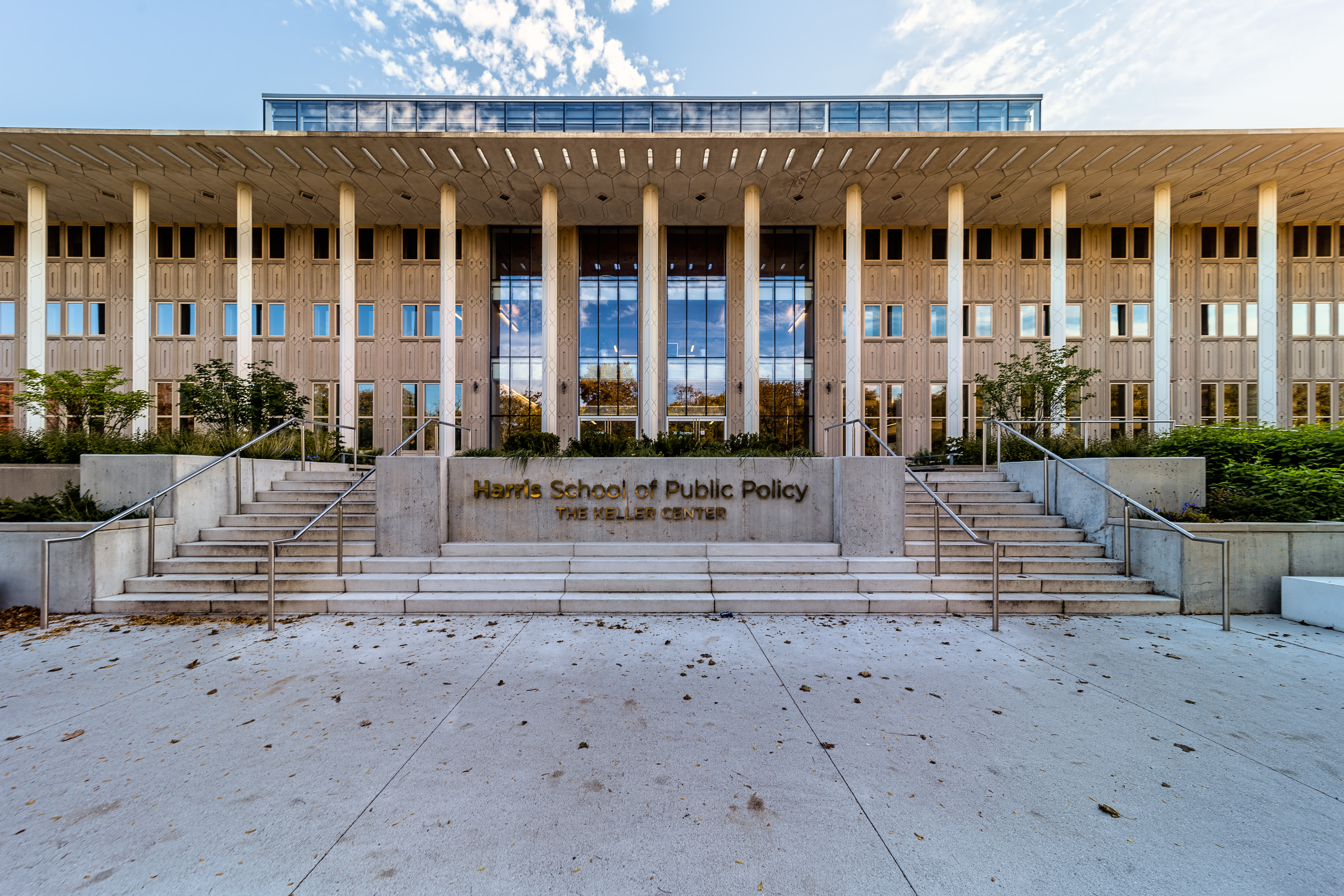
- The Keller Center
- Other name: The Irving B. Harris Graduate School of Public Policy Studies
- Motto: Social Impact, Down to a Science
- Type: Private
- Established: 1988
- Dean: Ethan Bueno de Mesquita
- Students: 839
- Location: 1307 East 60th Street, Chicago, Illinois, United States; 41.78557°N 87.5937828°W
- Campus: Urban
- Website: harris.uchicago.edu

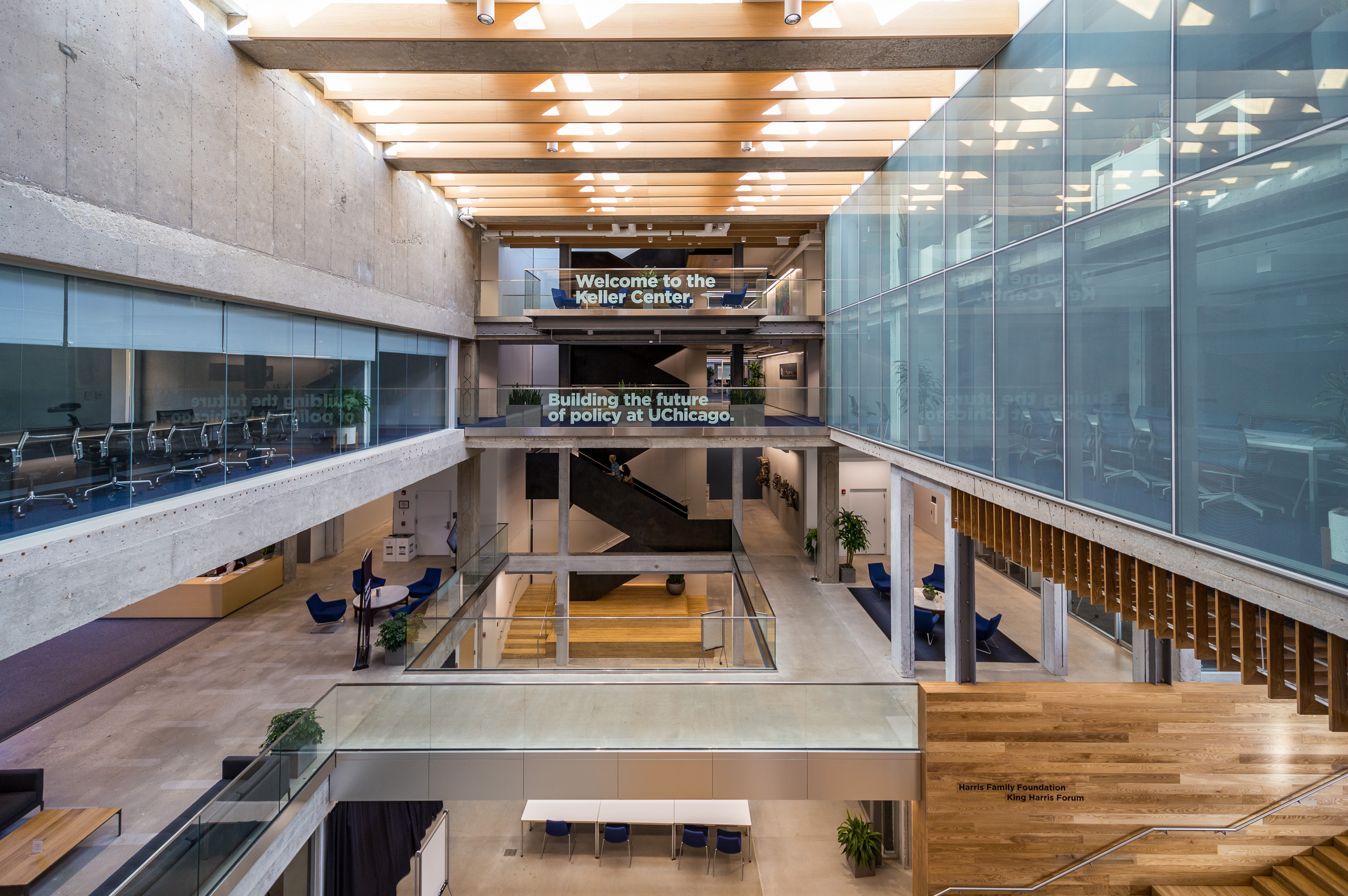
Inside the Keller Center

The University of Chicago Harris School of Public Policy (formally the Irving B. Harris Graduate School of Public Policy Studies) is the public policy graduate school of the University of Chicago in Chicago, Illinois, United States. It is located on the University of Chicago's main campus in Hyde Park.

The school is named after Irving B. Harris, who made a US$10 million donation that established the Harris School of Public Policy in 1988. In addition to policy studies and policy analysis, the school requires students to pursue training in economics and statistics as part of its rigorous Core Curriculum.

Harris offers joint degrees with the university's Business School, Law School, Social Work School, and the Division of the Social Sciences.

Harris is ranked third among policy analysis schools in the United States by U.S. News & World Report, and listed as the fourth best public policy institution globally in the field of economics research by RePEc.

== History ==
The Harris School of Public Policy was predated by the Committee on Public Policy and the University of Chicago Center for Policy Study. The Center on Public Policy, established in 1966, was a research center and so did not offer degrees. The Center hosted fellows and conferences and published research in the field of public policy, primarily urban studies and urban journalism.

The Committee on Public Policy was formed to offer master's degrees to students interested in policy studies. The Committee, formed of professors employed by different academic divisions, began offering classes in 1976 to a small group of one-year Master's students who had applied internally from other graduate divisions within the University of Chicago. Over the next three years the Committee began offering two-year degrees, joint BA/MA degrees and PhDs.

In 1986, a committee of deans recommended the Committee on Public Policy should secure a larger endowment and become a professional school. At that time, Irving Harris pledged $6.9 million in order to create the public policy school, a figure he later raised to $10 million. In 1988, the Harris School of Public Policy opened in the former American Bar Association Building which it has shared with affiliates including NORC at the University of Chicago and the Bulletin of the Atomic Scientists.

In 2014, the Harris School received two gifts totaling $32.5 million for a physical expansion. A former residence hall designed by architect Edward Durell Stone was renovated and renamed The Keller Center, housing the Harris School of Public Policy since 2019. The sustainably designed Keller Center's Forum provides a venue for speakers as well as open work space.

On January 7, 2019, the Harris School of Public Policy moved to the newly renovated Keller Center.

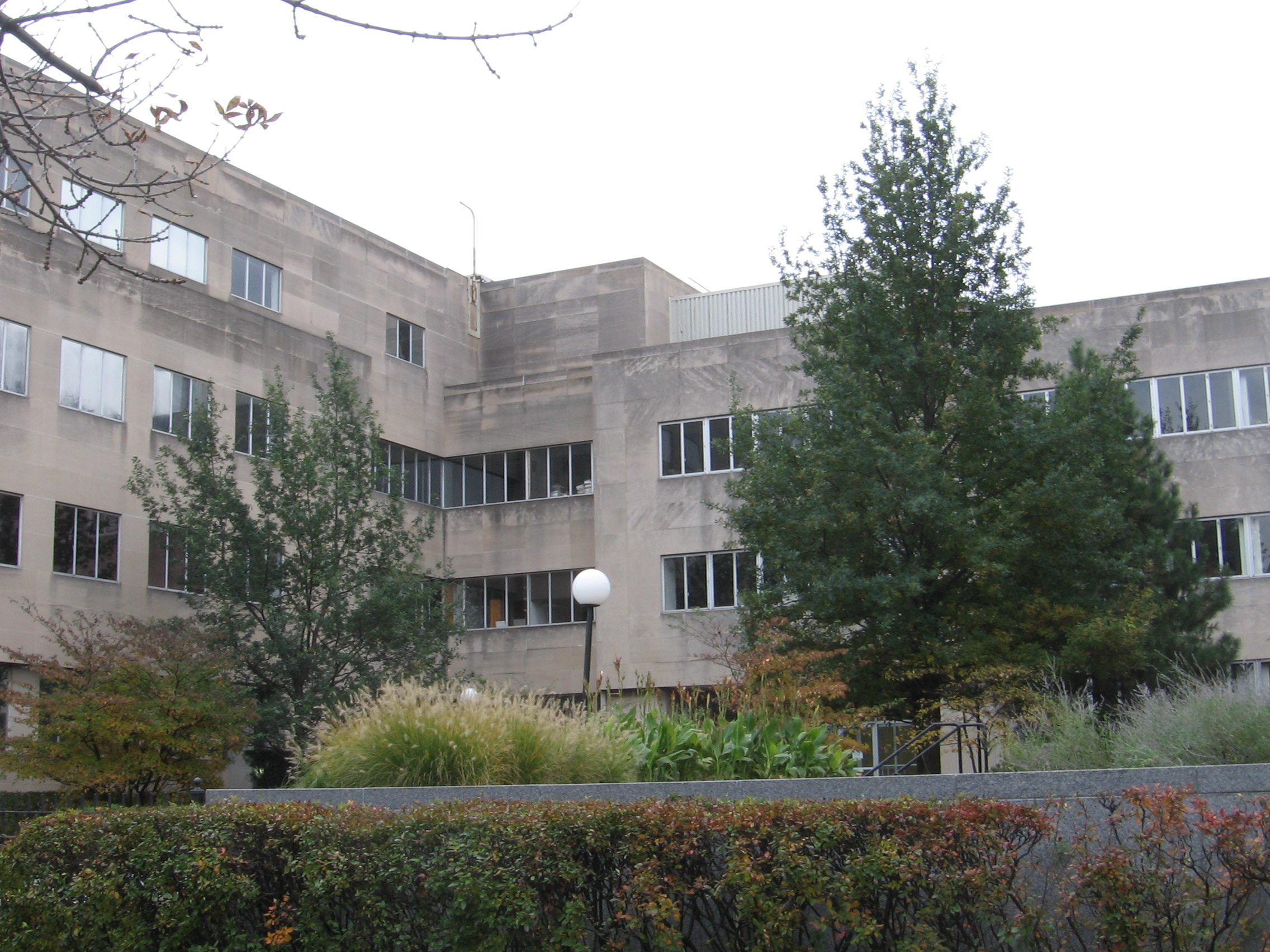
Harris Public Policy's previous building

== Degree Offerings ==
The Harris School of Public Policy offers the following graduate degrees:

- Master of Public Policy (MPP), the two-year flagship program with two-quarterstwo quarters of rigorous training in R programming, statistics, economics, and policy analysis, followed by four quarters of electives across the University of Chicago
- Master of Science (MS) in Computational Analysis and Public Policy, a two-year program offered jointly with the Department of Computer Science, with an emphasis on applying the latest computer science and technology to solve public policy challenges.
- Master of Arts (MA) in Public Policy, a 9-month, full-time program designed for those with multiple years of experience or a previous graduate degree, which consists of any five of the six core courses available to MPP candidates and four electives
- Master of Arts (MA) Part-time Evening Master's Program, a 15-month, part-time program for working professionals in downtown Chicago
- Master of Arts in Public Policy with Certificate in Research Methods (MACRM), a two-year research-oriented program designed to prepare students for doctoral study or quantitative research careers in academia, think tanks, and policy organizations. Students take PhD-level courses in areas such as economic theory, advanced statistics and econometrics, and political economy, and work with a faculty member through a research apprenticeship.
- Master of Science in Climate and Energy Policy (MSCEP), a one-year, full-time graduate program designed to train future leaders at the intersection of climate science, energy technology, data science, economics, and public policy, providing students with an understanding of the climate and energy challenge, rigorous training in applying data and evidence to policy design, and opportunities to learn and apply skills outside the classroom. This approach aims to equip graduates with the analytical tools, interdisciplinary perspectives, and intellectual rigor needed to craft solutions.
- Master of Science in Data Analytics & Policy (MSDAP), an accelerated 11-month program that combines training in programming and statistics classes like machine learning and program evaluation with the economics and political economy grounding to know which numbers actually matter for a decision. Graduates of MSDAP pursue careers in government, consulting, nonprofits, think tanks, international organizations, and private firms.
- The Harris Social Impact Fellowship, a selective, full-time, 11-month program for recent graduates and early career professionals with strong STEM skills interested in evidence-based change. Designed by Harris School of Public Policy faculty, the fellowship blends intensive training in policy analysis, critical reasoning, and data analytics with a hands-on placement at a top research center or policy institute. Fellows begin with eight weeks of academic coursework followed by nine months tackling urgent issues like educational equity, climate action, crime reduction, and government efficiency. The experience culminates in a capstone project addressing a real-world policy challenge.

== Specializations ==
The Harris School of Public Policy offers specializations, which function as areas of concentration within the degree. Specializations build upon the Core Curriculum with coursework in specific policy areas or technical skills. Harris offers specializations in the following policy areas:

- Data Analytics
- Education Policy
- Energy & Environmental Policy
- Finance & Policy
- Gender and Policy
- Global Conflict Studies
- Health Administration and Policy
- Health Policy
- International Policy & Development
- Markets & Regulation
- Municipal Finance
- Social and Economic Inequality
- Survey Research

== Dual degrees ==
The Harris School partners with other professional schools and divisions within the University of Chicago to offer accelerated joint/dual degrees.

- Five Year Master in Public Policy with the College (BA/MPP) in which undergraduates in the College at the University of Chicago earn a Bachelor’s degree plus a Master of Public Policy in five years
- Five Year MS in Computational Analysis and Public Policy with the College (BA/MSCAPP) in which undergraduates in the College at the University of Chicago and earn a Bachelor’s degree plus a Master of Science in Computational Analysis and Public Policy in five years.
- MPP/MDiv – Joint Degree with the Divinity School
- MPP/MBA – Joint Degree with the Booth School of Business
- MPP/JD – Joint Degree with the Law School
- MPP/SSL - Joint degree with the Crown Family School of Social Work, Policy
- MPP/MA - Joint degree with the Crown Family School of Social Work, Policy, and Practice
- MA/MA – Dual Degree Committee on International Relations (CIR)
- PhD in Political Economy – Joint degree with the Department of Political Science

== Credential Programs ==
- Data and Policy Summer Scholar program: The Data and Policy Summer Scholar program (DPSS) equips training in data analytics paired with hands-on policy research experience and professional development resources. The program includes three required modules: (1) Data Analytics in Public Policy; (2) Introduction to R Programming; and (3) a capstone research project. Participants can opt for either the academic track or the professional track, both of which aim to prepare participants for their next steps.
- Policy Research and Innovation Bootcamp (PRIB): A 2-week, in-person program focused on quantitative policy research skills for a social impact career.
- The International Policy Action Lab (IPAL) is a three-week program in Beijing designed for students and young professionals focused on data analysis and international policy research. Participants work with faculty members from Peking University and the University of Chicago.
- The Monetary Policy and International Finance Credential Program is a course for undergraduate students, graduate students, and working professionals interested in monetary and international finance policy areas. The program is taught jointly by faculty members at Peking University and Harris Public Policy as well as global finance industry leaders.
- The Environmental Economics and Policy Lab focuses on environmental economics and energy policy. It’s taught by faculty from the Harris School with field visits in Beijing, China. The course studies the application of economic analysis to the management of the environment and natural resource policy. Topics are introduced in the context of real-world environmental and energy policy questions, then translated into microeconomic theory to highlight the salient constraints and fundamental trade-offs faced by policymakers.
- Persuasive Writing Credential program: Participants learn to craft evidence-based policy stories. Participants also explore how to use human-centered design exercises to craft a research statement with key questions from public policy documents.
- The 2030 Agenda for Sustainable Development, adopted by all United Nations Member States in 2015, aims to provide a shared blueprint for peace and prosperity for people and the planet. Led by University of Chicago faculty with support from graduate instructors and alumni, the SDG program is a three-week research program designed for high school students who aspire to make a social impact and become informed leaders and decision-makers. Participants delve into the fundamentals of policy research, applying their skills to address real-world inquiries related to the UN SDGs. Beyond the classroom, students will connect with UChicago alumni and produce work deliverables to showcase their critical thinking and presentation skills.
- The Municipal Finance program was designed in partnership with the Harris School's Center for Municipal Finance and the Lincoln Institute of Land Policy. The program is led by Professor Justin Marlowe, Director of the Center for Municipal Finance at the Harris School; Luis Quintanilla, Program Analyst, Lincoln Institute; and Ge Vue, Director of Learning Design, Lincoln Institute. This four-day professional credential program provides a foundation in municipal finance with a focus on urban planning and economic development in the United States.
- The ESG and Impact Investing Lab course aims to prepare students to join the rapidly growing field of ESG (environmental, social, and governance). Through a combination of in-person lectures, case studies, and guest speakers, students develop an evidence-based approach to ESG, expand their industry network, and earn a shareable certification of completion.
- Public Capital Markets Credential (PCMC): In partnership with the Central University of Finance and Economics (CUFE) in China, the PCMC program is a two-week, full-time program for those interested in public finance and aspiring to work in public capital markets.
- Custom programs at the Harris School are designed to help clients invest in human capital, expand the rigorous analytical capacity of organizations, and create impact.

== Deans ==
The following professors served as Dean of the Harris School of Public Policy:

- Robert T. Michael (founding Dean) (1989–1994, 1998–2002)
- Don L. Coursey (1996–1998)
- Susan E. Mayer (2002–2009)
- Colm O'Muircheartaigh (2009–2014)
- Daniel Diermeier (2014–2016)
- Kerwin Charles (interim) (2016–2017)
- Katherine Baicker (2017–2023)
- Ethan Bueno de Mesquita (interim 2023-2024) (2024–Present)

== Notable faculty ==
There are four faculty members at the Harris School who have received the Sveriges Riksbank Prize in Economic Sciences in Memory of Alfred Nobel. Professor James J. Heckman, the Henry Schultz Distinguished Service Professor in Economics and the College, received the prize in 2000. Professor Roger Myerson is the David L. Pearson Distinguished Service Professor of Global Conflict Studies at The Pearson Institute for the Study and Resolution of Global Conflicts in the Harris School of Public Policy, the Griffin Department of Economics, and the College. He was awarded the 2007 Nobel Prize in Economic Sciences. Professor Michael Kremer is a director at the Development Innovation Lab at the University of Chicago, where he also teaches. He was the joint winner of the Sveriges Riksbank Nobel Prize in 2019. Professor James A. Robinson is a Pearson Professor of Global Conflict Studies and University Professor in the Harris School of Public Policy and the Department of Political Science. He has been awarded the 2024 Nobel Prize in Economic Sciences.

- James J. Heckman – Nobel Prize winning economist, Henry Schultz Distinguished Service Professor, and director of the Center for the Economics of Human Development
- Roger Myerson – Nobel Prize winning economist and game theorist, David L. Pearson Distinguished Service Professor of Global Conflict Studies
- Michael Kremer – Nobel Prize winning developmental economist, University Professor and director of Development Innovation Lab.
- David O. Meltzer – Director of the Center for Health and the Social Sciences and Chair of the Committee on Clinical and Translational Science
- Tomas J. Philipson – Daniel Levin Professor of Public Policy Studies, Harris School of Public Policy; Associate Faculty Member, Department of Economics
- Robert Rosner – William E. Wrather Distinguished Service Professor in the Department of Astronomy & Astrophysics Department of Physics, and the Enrico Fermi Institute
- Chris Blattman – Ramalee E. Pearson Professor and member of The Pearson Institute for the Study and Resolution of Global Conflicts
- James A. Robinson – Nobel Prize winning economist and political scientist; University Professor at the Harris School of Public Policy
- Jens Ludwig – McCormick Foundation Professor of Social Service Administration, Law, and Public Policy
- Dan A. Black – Deputy dean and professor, senior fellow at the National Opinion Research Center
- Stephen Raudenbush – Lewis-Sebring Distinguished Service Professor, Department of Sociology and the College; Chair, Committee on Education
- Konstantin Sonin – John Dewey Distinguished Service Professor
- Steven Durlauf – Economist and Professor of Public Policy and Education
- Susan Mayer – Sociologist and Former Harris School Dean who has written books on poverty and education
- Ariel Kalil - Behavioral Economist and author who co-directs the Behavioral Insights in Parenting Lab
- Damon Jones - Behavioural Economist and expert in racial inequality
