= David O. Meltzer =

Professor of Medicine at the University of Chicago (born 1964)

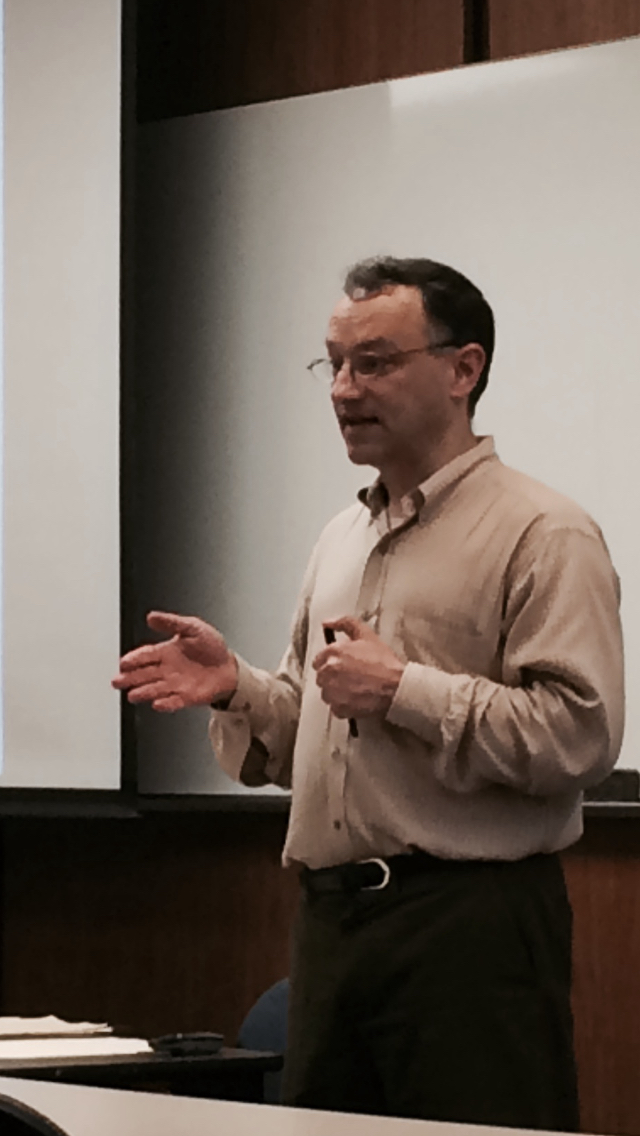
- Meltzer lecturing in Chicago, May 2015
- Born: David Owen Meltzer

Academic background
- Education: Yale University; University of Chicago
- Influences: Gary Becker; Sherwin Rosen

Academic work
- Discipline: Health economics Hospital medicine
- Institutions: University of Chicago

David Owen Meltzer (born 1964) is a Professor of Medicine at the University of Chicago. He holds faculty appointments in the Department of Medicine, Department of Economics and the Harris School of Public Policy. He is Chief of the Section of Hospital Medicine at the University of Chicago Medicine, and is the Director of the Center for Health and the Social Sciences (CHeSS), as well as the Director of the Urban Health Lab in Chicago, IL. In 2015 he was appointed a member of the faculty for the forthcoming Barack Obama Presidential Center which will be located in Chicago's South Side.

Meltzer was elected to the Institute of Medicine (IOM) in 2015 and has served on several committees, including the Committee for Organ Procurement and Transplantation Policy. He is also a member of the Methodology Committee for the Patient-Centered Outcomes Research Institute (PCORI). Finally, he serves on the 2nd U.S. Panel on Cost-effectiveness in Health and Medicine.

== Education ==
David Meltzer attended elementary school and high school at the University of Chicago Lab School in Chicago, IL. He went to college at Yale University in New Haven, CT and double-majored in Economics and Molecular Biophysics and Biochemistry.

After college he matriculated to the medical scientist training program at the University of Chicago where he earned an M.D. from the Pritzker School of Medicine as well as a Ph.D. in Economics. He developed his dissertation on the "Mortality Decline, the Demographic Transition, and Economic Growth" under the mentorship of Nobel-winning economist Gary Becker as well as Sherwin Rosen. Upon graduating from University of Chicago in 1992 he entered a residency program in Internal Medicine at Brigham and Women's Hospital (Harvard Medical School) in Boston, MA, where he simultaneously served as a Faculty Research Fellow at the National Bureau of Economic Research.

== Career ==
He returned to the University of Chicago as a member of the faculty in 1996. He has amounted a number of important contributions in the areas of medicine and health economics.

=== Health economics ===
As a health economist, Meltzer has made major contributions to the fields of medical Cost-effectiveness analysis and value of information analysis. His seminal paper about accounting for future costs which appeared in the Journal of Health Economics argued for including both direct and indirect medical costs related to chronic illness in both the numerator and denominator components of cost-effectiveness. He has also systematized the use of value of information analysis to prioritize research funding by subject area.

=== Hospital medicine ===
He is the founding Chief of the Section of Hospital Medicine at University of Chicago Medicine, which is a division in the Department of Medicine which staffs hospitalist physicians. It is one of the oldest and largest such divisions among academic medical centers in the country. Early in its conception, he began a multi-institutional clinical trial known as the Hospitalist Study. Today it is the largest collection of data on performance of Hospital medicine, which has shown improvements in care as a result of hospitalist intervention.

More recently, Meltzer received a prestigious Centers for Medicare and Medicaid Innovations (CMMI) award to study the Implications of a "Comprehensive Care Program" in which hospitalists physicians and advanced-practice providers follow-up with hospitalized patients in the home healthcare setting to reduce rehospitalization. For his work in this field he received the Society of Hospital Medicine's Award for Excellence in Research.

Other notable research studies where Meltzer is involved are the Oral Health Study and the CAPriCORN Project.

=== Public health ===
Meltzer is the Director of the University of Chicago Urban Health Lab, a non-profit research lab under the umbrella of the Harris School of Public Policy at the University of Chicago. The lab brings together academics, research scientists, and professionals to evaluate and implement evidence-based public health programs at scale. While the lab mostly focuses on issues in the Chicago area, it leads several projects that cross state and national boundaries.

Notable projects by the lab include Transform911, an effort to "explore how (America's) 9-1-1 system can better prioritize health and safety and ensure the right responder is dispatched at the right time", and the Road Map Initiative, which merged and analyzed data across different sectors to reveal insights into vulnerable individuals who cycle at high rates between the homeless services, Cook County Jail, and hospitals in Chicago.

== Personal ==
Meltzer resides in Chicago with his wife Dr. Vineet Arora, daughter Sonia, and son Aarin.
