= David Knowles =

David Knowles may refer to:

- David Knowles (California politician) (born 1952), California State Representative
- David Knowles (cricketer) (born 1948), New Zealand cricketer
- David Knowles (footballer) (1941–2011), English footballer
- David Knowles (scholar) (1896–1974), English Benedictine monk and historian
- David Knowles (journalist) (1991–2024), British journalist and podcaster
- David Knowles, British mountaineer killed during production of The Eiger Sanction (film)
- Davy Knowles (born 1987), British blues guitarist and singer

== See also ==
- William David Knowles (1908–2000), Canadian politician
