= Elthorne =

Elthorne may refer to:

- Elthorne (hundred)
- Elthorne (ward)

== See also ==
- Elthorne Park (disambiguation)
