= Tiffin School =

Boys' grammar school in London

Location
- Queen Elizabeth Road; Kingston upon Thames, Greater London, KT2 6RL; England; 51.4115°N 0.296°W

Information
- Type: Grammar school Academy
- Motto: Faire sans dire (French: 'To do without saying')
- Established: 1880
- Founders: John and Thomas Tiffin
- Specialists: Arts (performing) and language
- Department for Education URN: 136910 Tables
- Ofsted: Reports
- Chair: Phil Phillips
- Headteacher: Garth Williams
- Staff: c.95
- Gender: Boys (Co-Ed 16–18)
- Age: 11 to 18
- Enrolment: 1,418
- Houses: Churchill-Gordon; Darwin-Wilberforce; Drake; Kingsley-Montgomery; Livingstone; Raleigh; Scott; Turing-Nightingale
- Colours: Red, Blue
- Alumni: Old Tiffinians
- Website: www.tiffinschool.co.uk

Tiffin School is a boys' grammar school in Kingston upon Thames, England. It has specialist status in both the performing arts and languages. The school moved from voluntary aided status to become an Academy School on 1 July 2011. Founded in 1880, Tiffin School educates 1,400 pupils as of March 2023.

== Admissions ==
Entry into the school is by academic selection, using both an English and a mathematics test. The school admits 180 students each year in year 7. Since at least 2002, students have been able to apply to join Tiffin for Sixth Form (Years 12 and 13); approximately 35-40% of the boys are 'new boys', from other schools. Admission to the sixth form is based on GCSE results. From September 2019, the Sixth Form became co-educational and admits around 80 girls. Tiffin remains an all boys’ school from Years 7 to 11.

== History ==
Tiffin School Main Building, taken from the Head's Garden.

Plans were drawn up in 1874 for two new schools; Tiffin Boys' School and Tiffin Girls' School, each taking 150 pupils. A single building by the Fairfield housing both schools was opened in January 1880.

In 1929, the boys' school moved to its present site, in Queen Elizabeth Road near the centre of Kingston. It became a grammar school under the Education Act 1944. The school changed from being voluntary-controlled to being grant-maintained in 1992. On 1 July 2011, the school achieved Academy status.

=== New buildings ===
In 1937, a new building was opened for the Girls' School for 480 pupils. They had previously been in the same building as the Boys' School.

In 2011, an all-weather AstroTurf pitch was erected on part of the old grass field, funded by Jim Dixon and a National Lottery grant. The cricket nets were refurbished and named the Neil Desai cricket nets to commemorate his death.

Over the course of late 2017 and early 2018, a new building attached to the existing Dempsey Centre was opened.

== Present day ==
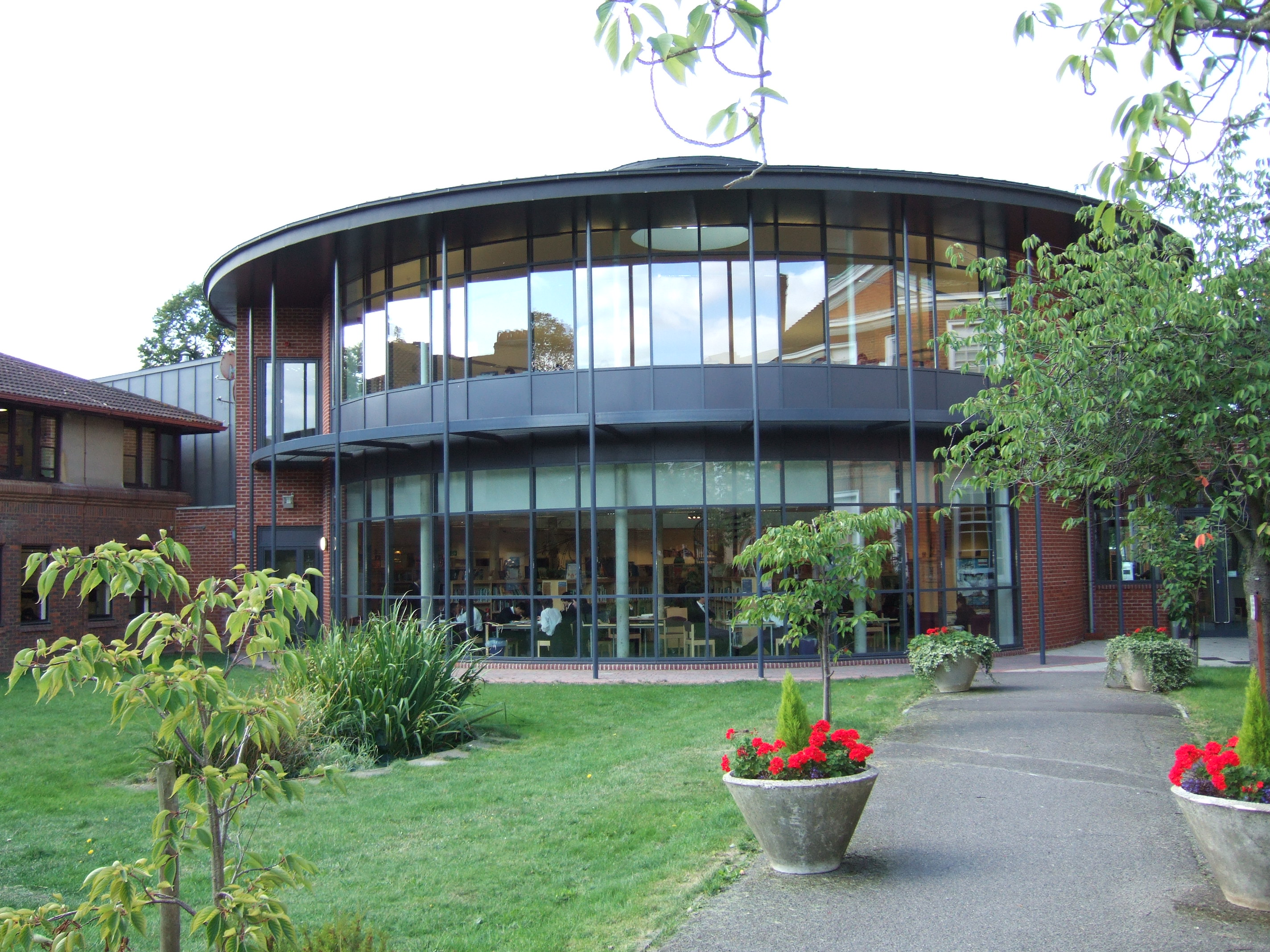
The Dempsey Centre

There are between 180 and 190 boys in each year, and about 500 in the Sixth Form. In 2019, the school began admitting girls to the sixth form, with an aim to have at least 100 girls overall between the Lower and Upper Sixth. The Dempsey Centre, named after Dr Tony Dempsey, who retired as head in 2004, was opened in September of that year. It contains ICT suites, a lecture theatre, a library and a new careers office.

In 2004, Sean Heslop took over as head of Tiffin School, due to Dempsey's retirement. Heslop subsequently left the school in 2009 to take a position at Folkestone Academy. He was subsequently arrested and bailed by the police on the charge of abusing a position of trust with a minor. He was acquitted of all charges.

In 2009, Hilda Clarke became the first female head of Tiffin School. She is a former head of Langley Grammar School in Slough and former deputy head of Tiffin Girls' School in Kingston upon Thames. In November 2014, it was announced that Clarke had stepped down and was replaced by the former deputy head and longstanding history teacher Mike Gascoigne. The current head is Garth Williams.

== Ofsted report ==
The Ofsted report in 2002 stated that "the school is very popular; annually, it receives around 1,300 applications for the 140 available places. Very nearly all 16-year-olds continue into the Sixth Form and around 40 more join the Sixth Form each year from other schools. On entry, the pupils’ and Sixth Form students’ attainment is very high compared with the national average." In the 2007 Ofsted Report, Tiffin was rated outstanding (grade 1) in every area.

In the 2013 Ofsted Report, pupils' exam results overall were in the top 40% of similar schools' results, and in the top 20% of all schools.

In the 2022 Ofsted Report, Tiffin was rated 'good' (grade 2) overall.

== Academic achievement ==
According to the Sunday Times Parent Power Guide, the school is ranked 10th in the top hundred State Secondary Schools based on 2011 examination results. The 2011 results for the school are:

- A-level %A*-B: 90.9
- GCSE %A*-A: 82.8

In 2022, the school achieved its "best set of grades" for GCSEs and A levels in the last 10 years.

- A-level %A*-B: 91.46
- GCSE %9-7: 84.52

== Music ==
The school has a prestigious choir and several musical ensembles, including a swing band and symphony orchestra, of which many pupils are also members of the nearby Thames Youth Orchestra. Every year, the school performs an oratorio either held in the Rose Theatre or the Tiffin Sports Hall, which consists of students, parents, staff and friends and is accompanied by the London Mozart Players or the Brandenburg Symphony Orchestra or the Sinfonia Britannica.

=== Tiffin Boys' Choir ===
The Tiffin Boys' Choir (directed by James Day), which celebrated its 60th anniversary in 2017, performs at venues including the Royal Opera House, the Royal Festival Hall, and the Barbican with London orchestras, and it regularly goes on tour. The choir has recorded CDs such as Rejoice in the Lamb and Christmas at Tiffin. It has also appeared on recordings of Mahler with Klaus Tennstedt, Puccini's Tosca with Antonio Pappano and Britten's War Requiem with Kurt Masur. The choir was featured on the last episode of TFI Friday, on the soundtrack of A Christmas Carol starring Kate Winslet, and on the subsequently released top-ten Kate Winslet single "What If".

== Sports ==
Tiffin School is active in all the main sports. It has facilities for rugby, athletics, football and cricket at a 29-acre (119,000 m²) site in East Molesey near Hampton Court, known as Grist's (named after a former headmaster). Tiffin School Boat Club is based at Canbury Boathouse, which is shared with Kingston Rowing Club along the Thames at Canbury Gardens. The school has a sports hall and all-weather AstroTurf pitch which are used by external sports clubs after and before school hours. Tiffin School provides ball boys for the Wimbledon Championships.

== Notable alumni ==
Former pupils are known as Old Tiffinians. The Tiffinian Association arranges reunion events such as dinners and sports fixtures.

Arts and entertainment

- Gethin Anthony, actor
- John Bratby, painter and writer
- James Seymour Brett, composer
- Herbie Flowers, musician
- Inno Genga, musician
- Jake Hendriks, actor
- Rich Keeble, actor
- Andrew Lawrence, comedian
- Sir Richard Mantle, director of Opera North
- Neil McDermott, actor
- Jonny Lee Miller, actor
- Will Varley, musician
- Alan Wheatley, theatrical performer, BBC announcer and star of the TV series Adventures of Robin Hood
- Milo McCabe, Comedian

Education and politics

- Ralph Allwood, choral conductor, composer and teacher
- Tom Bloxham, founder of Urban Splash
- James Boyden, Labour MP for Bishop Auckland
- Michael Dixon, Director of the Natural History Museum
- Philip Eggleton, discoverer of Phosphagens
- Chris Heaton-Harris, Conservative MP for Daventry (1979–86)
- Dennis Lindley, statistician
- Ben Obese-Jecty, Conservative MP for Huntingdon

Sport

- Neil Bennett, rugby union player for England
- Mark Feltham, cricketer
- Arun Harinath, cricketer Surrey CCC
- Rob Henderson, rugby union player for Ireland and the British and Irish Lions
- Gregor Kennis, cricketer
- Cameron McGeehan, footballer
- David Ottley, cricketer
- John Parlett, 800m runner, 1950 European champion
- Alec Stewart, former England cricket captain

Other

- Douglas Belcher, Victoria Cross recipient
- Roy Chaplin, aircraft designer at Hawker Aircraft, worked on Hawker Hurricane, Hawker Hunter and Hawker Siddeley Harrier.
- Reginald Foster Dagnall, founder of RFD and British aviation pioneer
- Frank Dobson lichenologist and businessman
- Roddy Elias, Swordfish navigator who flew from HMS Ark Royal and found the Bismarck
- Patrick Hobson, Military Cross, decorated British Army officer, Colonial Service officer and Anglican clergyman
- David Knowles, British journalist known for the podcast Ukraine: The Latest

== Notable former staff ==
- Roderick Williams, singer
