= Frank Dobson (disambiguation) =

Frank Dobson (1940–2019) is a British politician.

Frank Dobson may also refer to:

- Frank Dobson (Australian politician) (1835–1895), member of the Victorian Legislative Council from 1865
- Frank Dobson (American football) (1885–1956), American football coach
- Frank Dobson (lichenologist) (died 2021), British lichenologist
- Frank Dobson (sculptor) (1886–1963), British sculptor
- Frank Dobson (sport shooter) (born 1934), British Olympic shooter
