= 1953 Additional Honours (Korea) =

British government recognitions

The 1953 Additional Honours were appointments made by Queen Elizabeth II of the United Kingdom to various orders and honours released on 4 December 1953, in recognition of gallant and distinguished service in Korea.

== Most Excellent Order of the British Empire ==
Ribbon bar of the Order of the British Empire (Military)

Ribbon bar of the Order of the British Empire (Civil)

=== Commander of the Order of the British Empire (CBE) ===
Military Division

- Brigadier (temporary) Guy Patrick Gregson, DSO MC (34436), late Royal Regiment of Artillery.

=== Officer of the Order of the British Empire (OBE) ===
Military Division

- Major Reginald Gordon Atkinson, MC (63627), The Durham Light Infantry.
- Major Arthur John Batten, DCM (284001), Royal Regiment of Artillery.
- Lieutenant-Colonel (temporary) Edward Cecil Richard Blaker (53657), Royal Corps of Signals.
- Lieutenant-Colonel (now Colonel (temporary)) Arthur Maurice Field, MC (47560), Corps of Royal Engineers.
- Lieutenant-Colonel Gerald Charles Hopkinson, DSO MC (47586), Royal Tank Regiment, Royal Armoured Corps.
- Lieutenant-Colonel (temporary) Richard Ralph George Gower Godson Noyes, MBE (56667), Royal Army Service Corps.
- Lieutenant-Colonel Richard Hamish Taite (52726), The King's Own Royal Regiment (Lancaster).

=== Member of the Order of the British Empire (MBE) ===
Military Division

- Captain Douglas William Arthur Ambidge, MC (304676), Royal Tank Regiment, Royal Armoured Corps.
- Major Geoffrey John Athill (124793), Royal Army Ordnance Corps.
- Major Walter Bull (134778), Royal Regiment of Artillery.
- 2567260 Warrant Officer Class II George Alfred Calvert, The Durham Light Infantry.
- Major James Sidney Duncan (279935), Royal Army Service Corps (Expeditionary Force Institutes).
- Captain Graham Howell Edwards (364253), Royal Army Educational Corps.
- Major John Antony Fletcher (74532), Royal Regiment of Artillery.
- 10673511 Warrant Officer Class II Charles Harold Joseph Gibbens, The Durham Light Infantry.
- 4611264 Warrant Officer Class II John Stanley Hall, The Duke of Wellington's Regiment (West Riding).
- 5178368 Warrant Officer Class I Jack Hobbs, The Gloucestershire Regiment.
- Captain Charles Howard Hodkinson (251259), Royal Army Pay Corps.
- Major Derek Gordon Thomond Horsford, D.S.O. (380035), The King's Regiment (Liverpool).
- 797469 Warrant Officer Class I Alfred Leonard Hunt, Royal Regiment of Artillery.
- Major John Henry Peyton Jones (85547), Royal Regiment of Artillery.
- Major (temporary) John Alastair Kennedy (338800), Royal Tank Regiment, Royal Armoured Corps.
- Major Robert King-Clark, M.C. (62647), The Manchester Regiment.
- Major (temporary) Ian Aldan Poyntz-Gaynor Leigh (300503), Corps of Royal Engineers.
- Major Robert Andrew Alexander Scarth Macrae (66173), Seaforth Highlanders (Ross-shire Buffs, The Duke of Albany's).
- Captain James Anthony Massey (286773), Royal Corps of Signals.
- Major (temporary) (now Major) Guy Level Newberry-Cobbett (113325), Royal Army Service Corps.
- The Reverend Thomas James Trail Nicol, M.C. (160767), Chaplain to the Forces 4th Class, Royal Army Chaplains Department.
- The Reverend James Patrick Petry (414458), Chaplain to the Forces 4th Class, Royal Army Chaplains' Department.
- Major James Maxwell Sawers (95201), Royal Corps of Signals.
- 2754502 Warrant Officer Class I William Scott, The Black Watch (Royal Highland Regiment).
- Major Kenneth Musgrave Sykes (75113), Corps of Royal Electrical and Mechanical Engineers.
- 2717701 Warrant Officer Class I Dennis William Thompson, The King's Regiment (Liverpool).
- Captain (temporary) John Bryan Tonkinson (381263), The Durham Light Infantry.
- Captain Edward William Turner (342238), Corps of Royal Engineers.

== British Empire Medal (BEM) ==
Military Division

- 14821977 Warrant Officer Class II (acting) Charles Hutchison Anderson, Royal Regiment of Artillery.
- 5436972 Warrant Officer Class II (acting) Alfred Burt, Army Catering Corps.
- 22259436 Sergeant (acting) John Robert Coxon, The Durham Light Infantry.
- 819880 Staff-Sergeant (acting) Ernest Frederick Albert Ellis, Corps of Royal Electrical and Mechanical Engineers.'
- 3769322 Colour-Sergeant (acting) (now Colour-Sergeant) Robert Ernest Gee, the Bedfordshire and Hertfordshire Regiment.
- T/112705 Warrant Officer Class II (acting) Robert Tullis Houston, Royal Army Service Corps.
- 22538042 Warrant Officer Class II (acting) Henry Albert Martin, Royal Army Service Corps (Expeditionary Forces Institutes).
- 5182247 Warrant Officer Clajss II (acting) Albert Edward Morton, The Gloucestershire Regiment.
- 6845001 Warrant Officer Class II (acting) (now Warrant Officer Class I (acting)) Alfred Parish, Royal Corps of Signals.
- 6343388 Staff-Sergeant (provisional) Frank Rixon, Corps of Royal Electrical and Mechanical Engineers.
- 14462559 Sergeant William James Smyth, The Gloucestershire Regiment.
- 6203560 Sergeant (acting) Albert Sykes, The Gloucestershire Regiment.
- 22197930 Sergeant (acting) Kenneth Leslie Williams, Corps of Royal Military Police.

== Distinguished Service Order (DSO) ==
Third Bar to the Distinguished Service Order.

- Brigadier (temporary) Douglas Anthony Kendrew, CBE DSO (44766), late Infantry.

Second Bar Bar to the Distinguished Service Order.

- Major-General Michael Montgomerie Alston-Roberts-West, CB DSO (33582), late Infantry.

Bar to the Distinguished Service Order.

- Lieutenant Colonel Peter John Jeffreys, DSO OBE (44141), The Durham Light Infantry.

Distinguished Service Order.

- Lieutenant-Colonel Thomas Geoffrey Brennan, CBE (50228), Royal Regiment of Artillery.
- Captain Anthony Heritage Farrar-Hockley, MC (251309), The Gloucestershire Regiment.
- Major Edgar Denis Harding (67136), The Gloucestershire Regiment.

== Military Cross (MC) ==
Bar to the Military Cross.

- Major Aveling Barry Martin Kavanagh, MC (95620), The Duke of Wellington's Regiment (West Riding).
- Major William Miller Mackay, DSO MC (380040), Royal Regiment of Artillery.

Military Cross.

- Major Rudolf Edmund Austin (62586), The Duke of Wellington's Regiment (West Riding).
- Lieutenant David Leslie Borwell (409760), The Duke of Wellington's Regiment (West Riding).
- Captain (temporary) Peter Desmond Robin Childs (376220), Royal Regiment of Artillery.
- Captain George Leslie Conroy Cooper (357063), Corps of Royal Engineers.
- Lieutenant Geoffrey Tom Costello (379283), The Royal Hampshire Regiment.
- Second-Lieutenant Neville Frederick Deaville (424839), The King's Regiment (Liverpool).
- Major (temporary) Robert Keith Denniston (176941), Seaforth Highlanders (Ross-shire Buffs, The Duke of Albany's).
- Major Anthony Denys Firth, MBE (85646), The Duke of Wellington's Regiment (West Riding).
- Second-Lieutenant (now Lieutenant) David Stuart Gilbert-Smith (419724), The Duke of Wellington's Regiment (West Riding).
- Captain Noel Christopher Ogilvie Grant (296006), Royal Regiment of Artillery.
- Major Vivian Henry Spencer Hannay (125185), Corps of Royal Engineers.
- Captain Jerrold Alexander Harrison (289691), Royal Regiment of Artillery.
- Captain Robert Patrick Hickey, (359331), Royal Army Medical Corps.
- Major Henry Hubert Hill (95246), The Royal Fusiliers (City of London Regiment).
- Second-Lieutenant Patrick John Bogan Hobson (421516), The King's Regiment (Liverpool).
- Second-Lieutenant Douglas John Hollands (423800), The Duke of Wellington's Regiment (West Riding).
- Major John Douglas King-Martin (378783), Royal Regiment of Artillery.
- Major (temporary) Anthony Onslow Laurence Lithgow (177766), The Black Watch (Royal Highland Regiment).
- Second-Lieutenant Robert Brian Macgregor-Oakford (421593), The Durham Light Infantry.
- Captain Douglas Robert Patchett (375425), Royal Army Medical Corps.
- Second-Lieutenant Alec George Broome Salmon (423587), The South Wales Borderers.
- Major (temporary) Robert Edmond Scott (326145), The Durham Light Infantry.
- Major Francis Scott Gordon Shore (71008), Royal Regiment of Artillery.
- Second-Lieutenant (now Lieutenant) Humphrey Adam John Stacpoole (418393), The Duke of Wellington's Regiment (West Riding).
- Major John Aveline Waters Taylor (75264), The King's Own Royal Regiment (Lancaster).
- Lieutenant John Anthony Teague (408057), The Royal Fusiliers (City of London Regiment).
- Lieutenant Guy Frederick Bertram Temple (400087), The Gloucestershire Regiment.
- Second-Lieutenant Anthony Brian Uwins (420941), The King's Regiment (Liverpool).

== Distinguished Conduct Medal (DCM) ==
- 5182071 Warrant Officer Class II Harry Gallagher, The Gloucestershire Regiment.
- 5949801 Sergeant (acting) Peter John Pugh, The Gloucestershire Regiment.

== Military Medal (MM) ==
- 800936 Warrant Officer Class II George Eric Askew. Royal Regiment of Artillery.
- 22526706 Corporal Robert William Beattie, The Black Watch (Royal Highland Regiment).
- 22305965 Gunner Thomas Bond, Royal Regiment of Artillery.
- 1779557 Sergeant (acting) Frederick James Brundish, Royal Tank Regiment, Royal Armoured Corps.
- 21015022 Sergeant (acting) Thomas Fain Clayden, The Gloucestershire Regiment.
- 22612736 Fusilier (now Lance-Corporal (acting)) John Sidney Dalton, The Queen's Royal Regiment (West Surrey), attached The Royal Fusiliers (City of London Regiment).
- 251663 Private Sidney Edwards. The Gloucestershire Regiment.
- 22615533 Gunner William George Elcoat, Royal Regiment of Artillery.
- 22692390 Private Edward David Ellison, The Royal Inniskilling Fusiliers attached The King's Regiment (Liverpool).
- 22549787 Corporal Michael Montague Garrett, The Royal Sussex Regiment.
- 22637355 Lance-Corporal (acting) Ronald Henry Griffiths, Corps of Royal Engineers.
- 22621410 Private (now Lance-Corporal) Derek Harvey, The King's Regiment (Liverpool).
- 5348543 Staff-Sergeant (acting) (now Sergeant) Clifford Jackson, DCM, Intelligence Corps.
- 2524254 Corporal (acting) Robert Lofthouse, The King's Own Yorkshire Light Infantry attached The Durham Light Infantry.
- 14181341 Sergeant (acting) John Macfarlane, Royal Tank Regiment,. Royal Armoured Corps.
- 2410094 Lance-Bombardier (acting) Geoffrey Machen, Royal Regiment of Artillery.
- 22795542 Corporal (acting) Henry McKenzie, The Green Howards (Alexandra, Princess of Wales's Own Yorkshire Regiment).
- 22530094 Private Robert Leslie Middleton, The Gloucestershire Regiment.
- 1151574 Bombardier Arthur Newbold, Royal Regiment of Artillery.
- 22249555 Sergeant (acting) Thomas Nowell, The York and Lancaster Regiment.
- 7265709 Corporal Cyril James Papworth, Royal Army Medical Corps.
- 1444977 Sergeant (Acting) Sydney Robinson, The Gloucestershire Regiment (since died).
- 6103948 Private James Arthur Walter Robson. The Gloucestershire Regiment.
- 122208199 Sergeant (acting) John Boyle Simpson, Royal Regiment of Artillery.
- 22773552 Lance-Corporal now Corporal (acting)) Robert James Stockton, The King's Own Yorkshire Light Infantry.
- 2530161 Private Douglas Michael Robertson Walker, The Gloucestershire Regiment.
- 14051827 Sergeant (acting) Allan James George Wallace, Royal Tank Regiment, Royal Armoured Corps.
