= Douglas Walter Belcher =

Recipient of the Victoria Cross

Douglas Walter Belcher VC
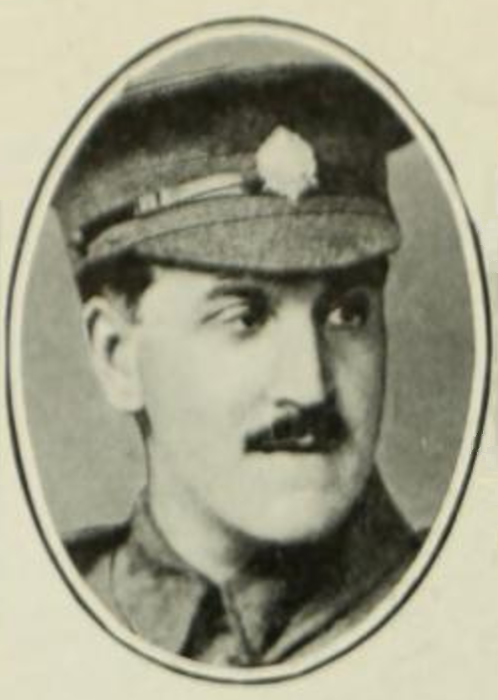
- Born: 15 July 1889; Surbiton, Surrey
- Died: 3 June 1953 (aged 63); Claygate, Surrey
- Burial place: Holy Trinity Churchyard, Claygate
- Military career
- Allegiance: United Kingdom/British Empire
- Branch: British Army
- Service years: 1914–1922, 1939–1940
- Rank: Captain
- Units: London Regiment; King's Royal Rifle Corps; Royal Army Pay Corps
- Conflicts: World War I: Western Front; Second Battle of Ypres; 1920 Iraqi revolt World War II
- Awards: Victoria Cross

Douglas Walter Belcher VC (15 July 1889 – 3 June 1953) was an English recipient of the Victoria Cross, the highest and most prestigious award for gallantry in the face of the enemy that can be awarded to British and Commonwealth forces.

== Early life ==
Douglas Walter Belcher was born on 15 July 1889 in Surbiton, in the county of Surrey, England. He received his formal education at Tiffin Boys School in Kingston upon Thames. In 1914 he was employed as a furniture salesman in the Antiques department of Waring & Gillow on Oxford Street.

== Military career ==
He volunteered pre-war as Rifleman No.9539 with the 5th London Regiment (London Rifle Brigade), T.F., in March 1913, and was mobilized on United Kingdom's declaration of war on 4 August 1914 and its entry into World War I.

He entered France with the Regiment's 1st Battalion in November 1914, and was an awarded the Victoria Cross for his actions during the Second Battle of Ypres in May 1915 whilst a sergeant.

On returning to England in mid-1915 he was presented with the medal by King George V at a ceremony at Buckingham Palace in July 1915, and promoted to the rank of Company Sergeant-Major, and served as a training officer with the London Rifle Brigade's 3rd Battalion, until receiving a commission as a 2nd Lieutenant with the 3rd Battalion of the 8th London Regiment (Post Office Rifles), T.F., in February 1916.

He married Miss Emily Francis Luxford in Surbiton in January 1917.

He was subsequently assigned as a training officer at the Depot of the 1/6th Gurkha Rifles.

He re-enlisted as a professional soldier with the British Army post-war, and saw Imperial service in the Middle East during the 1920 Iraqi Revolt, and subsequently in Burma. He was discharged from the British Army in 1922.

== Award of the Victoria Cross ==
Belcher was awarded the Victoria Cross for heroism in action with the London Rifle Brigade during the 2nd Battle of Ypres in April 1915, when he was 25 years of age.

Citation

On the early morning of 13th May, 1915, when in charge of a portion of an advanced breastwork south of the Wieltje-St. Julien Road during a very fierce and continuous bombardment by the enemy, which frequently blew in the breastwork, Lance-Serjeant Belcher with a mere handful of men elected to remain and endeavour to hold his position after the troops near him had been withdrawn. By his skill and great gallantry he maintained his position during the day, opening rapid fire on the enemy, who were only 150 to 200 yards distant, whenever he saw them collecting for an attack. There is little doubt that the bold front shown by Lance-Serjeant Belcher prevented the enemy breaking through on the Wieltje Road, and averted an attack on the flank of one of our Divisions.

— London Gazette

He was the second member of the British Army's Territorial Force to receive the medal, Lieutenant Geoffrey Woolley having been first awarded it during the fighting at 2nd Ypres a few days earlier.

Commemorative plaque in Victoria Cross Grove, Tunbridge Wells.

== Medals awarded in World War I ==
Belcher was also awarded the 1914 Star, the British War Medal, Victory Medal along with the Victoria Cross (which is today displayed at the Royal Green Jackets (Rifles) Museum in Winchester, Hampshire, England).

== Later life ==
Belcher suffered from ill health in his middle years, and went through a number of occupations, from running a greengrocer's shop in Kent, farming in the county of Suffolk, to clerical work in the City of London. His first marriage produced two sons, but was divorced in the mid 1930s. On the outbreak of World War II he briefly re-enlisted with the British Army, but was discharged soon afterwards through injury and ill health. He remarried in London in 1941, and was resident in Surbiton post-war.

== Death ==
He died on 3 June 1953 aged 63. His body was buried in the churchyard of Holy Trinity Church, in Claygate, Surrey.

== Bibliography ==
- Batchelor, Peter; Matson, Christopher (2011). The Western Front 1915. VCs of the First World War. The History Press. ISBN 978-0-7524-6057-4.
- Oldfield, Paul (2014). Victoria Crosses on the Western Front August 1914–April 1915: Mons to Hill 60. Pen and Sword Books. ISBN 978-1783030439.
