= Richard Mantle =

Sir Richard Mantle OBE DL
- Born: Richard John Mantle; 21 January 1947 (age 79)
- Education: Tiffin School
- Alma mater: Ealing College of Advanced Technology
- Occupation: cultural administrator

Sir Richard John Mantle OBE DL (born 21 January 1947) is a British cultural administrator, who has served as General Director of Opera North since 1994 and will retire in 2023, to be replaced by Laura Canning.

== Biography ==
Mantle was born on 21 January 1947. He was educated at the Tiffin School, an all-boys grammar school in Kingston upon Thames, and then at the Ealing College of Advanced Technology.

He joined Beecham Group to work in personnel in 1969. After Beecham, he undertook a similar, more senior role at J. Walter Thompson, before joining the English National Opera in 1980, first as Personnel Director and then deputy managing director until 1985. Mantle was the managing director of Scottish Opera for 1985 to 1991, then Edmonton Opera in Canada from 1991 to 1994, before joining Opera North.

Mantle is active in the Church of England and worships at St Wilfrid's Church, Harrogate. He has been a guardian of the Shrine of Our Lady of Walsingham since 1998 and its current treasurer, and is treasurer of Forward in Faith, a traditionalist Anglo-Catholic organisation. He has been a member of the council of the College of the Resurrection, Mirfield, an Anglo-Catholic theological college, since 2009, and was a member of the Archbishops' Council Finance Committee from 2010 to 2015. Since 2010, he has been an elected member of the General Synod of the Church of England.

Mantle was awarded an honorary Doctor of Music (DMud) degree by the University of Leeds in 2009, and an honorary degree by the University of York in 2022. He was appointed Officer of the Order of the British Empire (OBE) in the 2013 Birthday Honours for services to music. He was knighted as a Knight Bachelor in the 2023 Birthday Honours for services to opera. He has served as Deputy lieutenant for West Yorkshire since 2012.
