= Vita Haroldi =

Anonymous work c. 1205 about Harold Godwinson

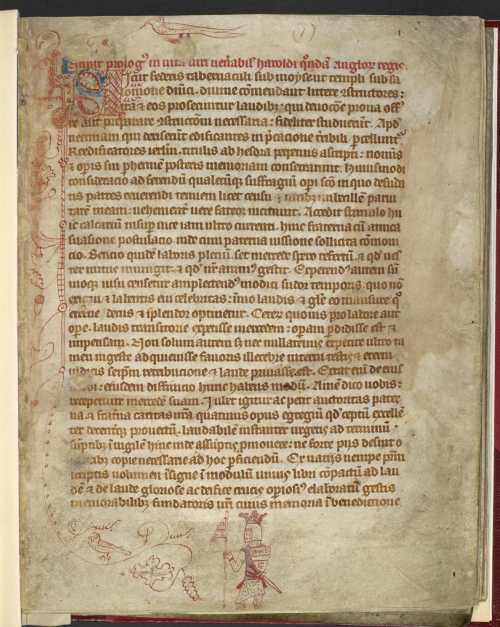
The opening page of the Vita Haroldi in its sole surviving manuscript, British Library Harley MS 3776

The Vita Haroldi (English: Life of Harold) is an anonymous Latin work, written around the year 1205, which claims to relate the life of king Harold Godwinson. It asserts that Harold was not killed at the Battle of Hastings but survived for many years, first journeying on the continent of Europe and then living as a hermit in various parts of England and Wales. It survives in only one manuscript, copied in Waltham Abbey, and it may have been composed there. Harold was certainly a patron of Waltham Abbey and was in all likelihood buried there.

== Synopsis ==
In the Prologue, the writer accepts from his ecclesiastical sponsors the commission to write about Harold, a devotee, like them, of the Holy Cross. The Vita proper begins with some account of Harold's father, Earl Godwin, in particular detailing a mission to Denmark in which he escapes a treacherous attempt to kill him and marries the King of Denmark's sister. It then moves on to Harold and his Welsh wars, in the course of which he contracts a paralytic illness which baffles doctors. He is miraculously healed by the Holy Cross of Waltham, gratefully builds a new church there to house it, and endows it with many treasures. It is later refounded by Henry II. Harold is raised by God to the throne of England and defeats Norwegian invaders, but is struck down by his Norman enemies. The writer of the Vita names his authority for much of the foregoing as Sebricht, a former servant of Harold who subsequently became a most holy pilgrim and hermit.

Harold is left for dead by the Normans, but is healed by a Saracen woman in Winchester as he lies concealed there for two years. He then visits Saxony and Denmark, but finds no help for his cause. Seeing at last that God has turned against him, he adopts a life of humility and devotion and becomes a pilgrim, just as he had in former days, before he ascended the throne, made a perilous pilgrimage to Rome. The writer praises Harold's piety, then discusses the oath Harold swore to support William of Normandy's claim to the English throne. Some condemn him as a perjurer, citing the fact that God stripped the oak under which he swore the oath of all its bark. Others, including the writer, justify his perjury on the grounds that his oath was given under duress and that complying with it would have been disastrous for the English people. God, the writer argues at length, showed his approval of Harold's decision by this same miracle, by giving him victory over the Norwegians, and by another miracle in which the figure of Christ on the Holy Cross bowed to him.

Returning home after many years abroad, Harold adopts the name of Christian, becomes a hermit in a cave near Dover and lives there for ten years. Then he journeys to Wales and lives incognito there, tormented by the brutal natives but returning good for evil until he has won them over. In his old age he moves to a hermitage at St John's Church in Chester, still concealing his identity.

Here the writer breaks off to consider other accounts of Harold's end, censuring William of Malmesbury for writing that he had died at the Battle of Hastings, but commending Aelred of Rievaulx for allowing the possibility that he survived it. Waltham Abbey's claim that Harold was buried there is mistaken, another body on the battlefield at Hastings having been misidentified as Harold's. This fact was confirmed by Harold's brother, Gyrth, when he met the Abbot of Waltham during the reign of Henry II. The writer takes issue with his source, a hermit, as to the motives of Harold's actions, before quoting at length that hermit's account of Harold's life after the Battle of Hastings, which recapitulates the events summarised above.

The writer ends with a brief account of Harold's last days, during which he reveals his real identity to his confessor and at last dies.

== Manuscript ==
The Vita Haroldi survives in a single manuscript, British Library Harley MS 3776, which was copied some time between 1345 and c. 1370 by a scribe apparently little acquainted with Latin. The Vita forms the first article in this manuscript, being followed immediately by the De Inventione Crucis de Waltham [On the Finding of the Cross of Waltham] and then by several other works, some relating to Waltham Abbey and its Holy Cross.

The manuscript was kept at Waltham Abbey until its dissolution in 1540. It then came into the hands of the Dukes of Norfolk, being kept by them at Naworth Castle. In 1720 it was in the possession of the antiquary and herald John Warburton, and was sold by him then to Humfrey Wanley, librarian to Robert Harley, Earl of Oxford, whose collection was later sold to the British Museum.

== Date and authorship ==
The Vita Haroldi is believed to have been written around the year 1205. The name of its author is not known. It has been surmised that he was a canon at Waltham Abbey; or, since it contradicts that abbey's claim to have the grave of Harold, a canon who had been expelled from it; or perhaps someone associated with Chester rather than Waltham. A suggestion that he was the hagiographer Jocelyn of Furness has not found favour.

== Themes and genre ==
The Vita Haroldi has since the 19th century been dismissed by historians as a mere romance, and indeed it does have features in common with the chivalric romances of the time, dealing as it does with the adventures of a swashbuckling warrior favoured by God. But it also has all of the typical characteristics of a saint's life apart from a list of the protagonist's miracles and a specified burial site. Harold's life is shown as being Christlike in that he endures injury and humiliation from lesser people and transcends these sufferings to reach final redemption.

Reading the text comparatively alongside Gerald Vizenor's 1978 science-fiction short story "Custer on the Slipstream", Tarren Andrews has argued that "The Vita Haroldi, like 'Custer on the Slipstream,' narrativizes desires precipitated by settler colonization. In both stories, the violence of settler colonization needs to be contained and mitigated. Narrative becomes a way to apply boundaries to the traumas and to reimagine futures irrevocably shaped by those traumas". However, she also found that the Vita's fantasy of Harold missionising the Welsh as a substitute for reconquering England "is distinct from Indigenous survivance in that it replicates colonial structures rather than imagines alternatives. Harold's 'success' in Wales is the epitome of English settler identity".

== Analogues ==
The whole of the Vita Haroldi’s account of its hero's life after Hastings is universally agreed to be fictional, but it was not all invented by the Vita’s author. Medieval legends of English and British kings surviving their supposed deaths are not uncommon, Edward II, Richard II, and of course King Arthur being examples. In Harold's case, two 12th-century works, Aelred of Rievaulx's Life of St Edward (c. 1163) and Gerald of Wales's Journey Through Wales (1191), report rumours of his survival, Gerald specifying that he is supposed to have ended as an anchorite in Chester. After the Vita Haroldi was written similar stories appeared in the works of Gervase of Tilbury, Ralph of Coggeshall (who reports that Harold was still alive in 1189!), Ranulf Higden, John Brompton, and Henry Knighton. It is also referred to in at least two Icelandic works, Játvarðar Saga and Hemings þáttr Áslákssonar.

Similarities have been detected between the Vita Haroldi and works in which Harold does not figure. One Latin version of Óláfs saga Tryggvasonar gives an account of the supposed life of its hero, Olaf Tryggvason, after the Battle of Svolder which has many points of resemblance with the Vita, but it is not clear whether the saga's author, Oddr Snorrason, drew on the Vita or on traditional lore which could perhaps also have influenced the Vita. One episode in the Vita tells how Harold's father, Godwin, is sent by king Canute to Denmark bearing messages which, when Godwin reads them en route, prove to be instructions to their Danish addressees to kill him; Godwin rewrites them to the effect that he should be welcomed and given the king's sister in marriage, and this ruse succeeds. There are very similar stories to this one in the early 13th-century Danish chronicle of Saxo Grammaticus (and in Shakespeare's Hamlet, which drew on Saxo), in Hemings þáttr Áslákssonar, and in a number of Classical and Eastern sources. There are more general parallels with the Middle English poem Sir Orfeo, which also deals with a king's prolonged exile in his own former kingdom after a dreadful personal loss. Also with the Anglo-Norman romances of Gui de Warewic, the story of an English warrior who becomes first a pilgrim and then a hermit, and Boeve de Haumtone, which features a Saracen woman aiding another English knight. Among English hagiographies, Reginald of Durham's Vita et miracula Sancti Godrici and John of Ford's Vita Wulfrici anchoretae Haselbergiae have been singled out as showing particular similarities to the Vita Haroldi. All three concentrate not so much on the moment of conversion as on the progressive deepening of religious conviction; they also all feature the wearing of armour for penitential reasons.

The Vita Haroldi was the inspiration for at least one modern work of literature, Rudyard Kipling's tale "The Tree of Justice", collected in his Rewards and Fairies (1910). Harold, a supposedly "witless man" constantly on pilgrimage in England, is discovered by Henry I's jester, Rahere, and brought before the king. He dies at the moment his identity is recognised and his royal status honoured by king and courtiers.

== Editions ==
- Michel, Francisque (1836). Chroniques anglo-normandes. Recueil d'extraits et d'écrits relatifs à l'histoire de Normandie et d'Angleterre pendant les XI^{e} et XII^{e} siècles. Rouen: Édouard Frère. pp. 143–222.
- Giles, Rev. Dr., ed. (1854). Vita [sic] quorundum [sic] Anglo-Saxonum: Original Lives of Anglo-Saxons and Others, Who Lived Before the Conquest. London: J. Russell Smith for the Caxton Society. pp. 38–95.
- Birch, Walter de Gray, ed. (1885). Vita Haroldi: The Romance of the Life of Harold, King of England (PDF). London: Elliot Stock.

== Translations ==
- Birch, Walter de Gray, ed. (1885). Vita Haroldi: The Romance of the Life of Harold, King of England (PDF). London: Elliot Stock.
- Swanton, Michael, ed. (1984). Three Lives of the Last Englishmen. Garland Library of Medieval Literature, 10. New York: Garland. pp. 3–40. ISBN 9780824094225.
