= Elthorne Park =

Elthorne Park may refer to:

- Elthorne Park, a park in the London Borough of Ealing; see Hanwell § Elthorne Park.
- Elthorne Park, a park in the London Borough of Islington; see Islington parks and open spaces.
- Elthorne Park High School in the London Borough of Ealing
