= Waltham Abbey Church =

Parish church in Waltham Abbey, Essex, England

Coordinates: 51.6875°N 0.0035°W

Waltham Abbey
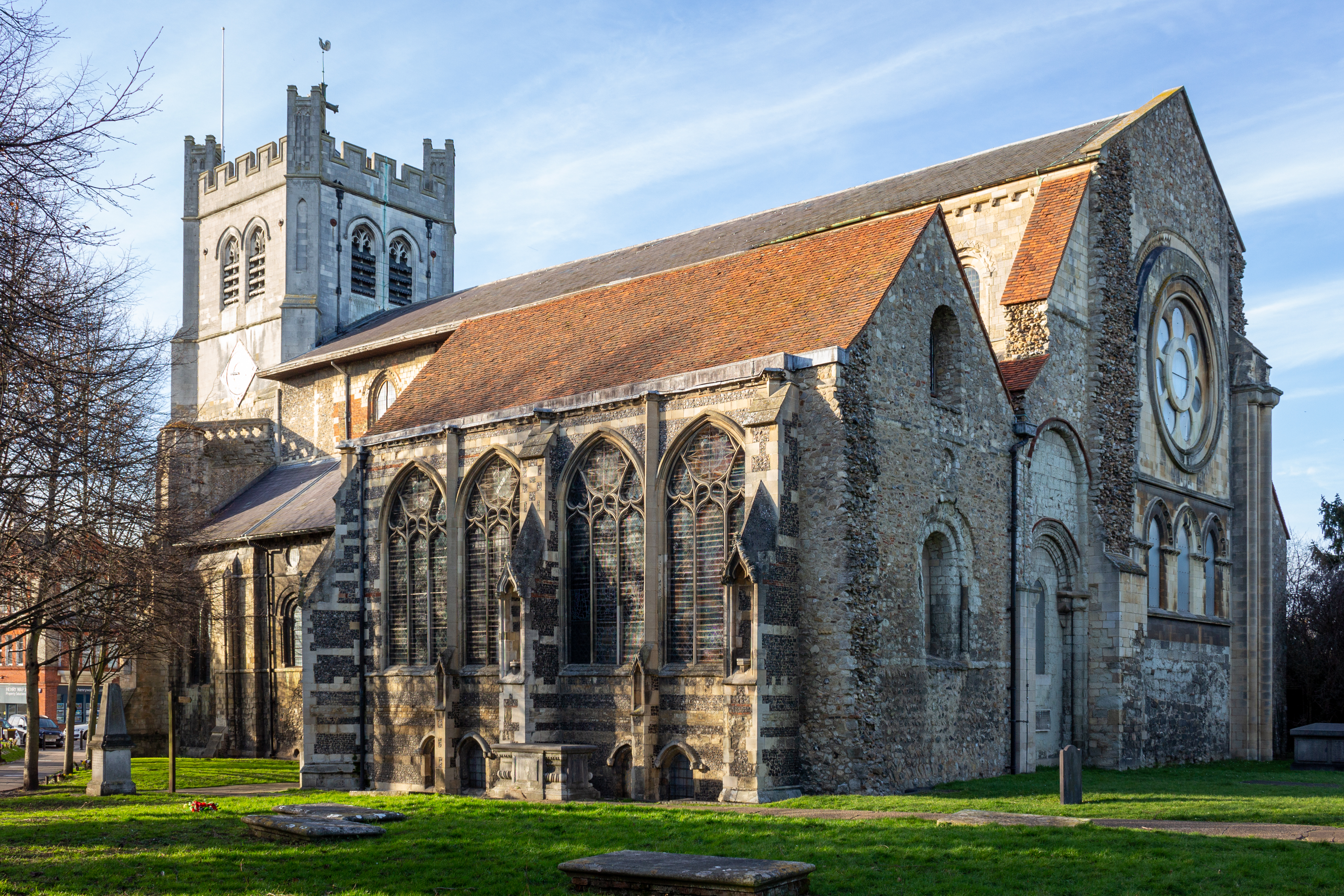
- Waltham Abbey

- Location of Waltham Abbey
- Location: Waltham Abbey, Essex
- Country: England
- Denomination: Church of England
- Website: www.walthamabbeychurch.co.uk

History
- Founded: 1030
- Dedication: The Holy Cross and Lawrence of Rome
- Consecrated: 1060 (present church)

Architecture
- Heritage designation: Grade I listed building
- Architectural type: Abbey
- Style: Norman

Administration
- Province: Canterbury
- Diocese: Chelmsford
- Deanery: Epping Forest
- Parish: Waltham Holy Cross

Clergy
- Vicar: The Revd Peter Smith

The Abbey Church of Waltham Holy Cross and St Lawrence, also known as Waltham Abbey or Waltham Abbey Church, is the parish church of the town of Waltham Abbey, Essex, England. It has been a place of worship since the 7th century. The present building dates mainly from the early 12th century and is an example of Norman architecture. To the east of the existing church are traces of an enormous eastward enlargement of the building, begun following the re-foundation of the abbey in 1177. In the Late Middle Ages, Waltham was one of the largest church buildings in England and a major site of pilgrimage; in 1540 it was the last religious community to be closed during the Dissolution of the Monasteries. It is still the parish church for the town, and is a grade I listed building.

The monastic buildings and those parts of the church east of the crossing were demolished at the Dissolution, and the Norman crossing tower and transepts collapsed in 1553. The present-day church consists of the nave of the Norman abbey church, the 14th-century lady chapel and west wall, and a 16th-century west tower, added after the dissolution.

King Harold Godwinson, who died at the Battle of Hastings in 1066, is said to be buried in the present churchyard.

== History ==
Archaeological investigations between 1984 and 1991 revealed a much earlier origin of the site than had previously been believed. There is evidence for five distinct churches at Waltham.

=== First church at Waltham (7th century) ===
Traces of the flint rubble foundations of a 7th-century wooden church have been found under the choir of the present building; an associated burial has been radiocarbon dated to between 590 and 690. A proposed date of circa 610 would place its construction in the reign of Sæberht of Essex, who was noted for his church-building activities. Other finds included a 7th-century Kentish jewellery book-clasp depicting eagles grasping a fish.

=== Second church (8th century) ===
During the reign of King Offa of Mercia, whose rule extended to the Kingdom of Essex in the late 8th century, a building of Barnack stone was constructed around the earlier wooden church. It was half the length of the present building, and was a porticus-type church with chambers along each side of the nave. It was intended as a minster serving several communities in the area.

=== Legend of the Holy Cross ===
At the beginning of the 11th century, the church and manor of Waltham were held by an Anglo-Danish thegn called Tovi the Proud. A legend, recorded in the 12th-century De Inventione Sanctœ Crucis Nostrœ ("The Discovery of our Holy Cross") or "Waltham Chronicle", relates that, in about 1016, the blacksmith at another estate belonging to Tovi, at Montacute near Glastonbury, found a large black flint (or marble) crucifix buried at the top of a hill, after a dream. Tovi had the cross loaded onto an ox-cart, but the oxen would only go in one direction and continued every day until they reached Waltham, a journey of some 150 miles. This Holy Rood or Cross was installed at the church and soon became the subject of pilgrimage. Tovi is said to have rebuilt the church, but modern evidence suggests that he probably retained the 8th-century fabric of the building.

=== Third church (King Harold's foundation) ===
After Tovi's death, his son fell into debt and the estate passed to King Edward the Confessor. He then gave it to Harold Godwinson (later King Harold II), who rebuilt, refounded and richly endowed the church, which was dedicated in 1060; a legend says that this was because in his childhood, he had been miraculously cured of paralysis by the Holy Cross. The new church was placed under the control of a dean and a college of twelve married priests. Evidence suggests that stone and some of the foundations of the previous church were re-used for the new building, which had a nave the same length as the present one, aisles, a large transept and a small eastern apse.

=== Fourth church (Norman) ===
Starting in about 1090, Harold's building was demolished and a new church with crossing tower and transepts was begun in the Norman style. It reused the Saxon foundations and some of the stonework, with additional stone from Reigate, Kent and Caen in Normandy. The church was cruciform, with a tower at the crossing and two smaller towers at the west end. The nave had typically massive Norman pillars with incised decoration and semi-circular arches supporting a triforium and clerestory above. A long eastern chapel may have housed the Holy Cross. The rebuilding, which had started at the eastern end, was completed by about 1150. Although there is a marked stylistic resemblance to Durham Cathedral, a recent study of the features of the church and comparison with other sites has concluded that the master mason at Waltham was trained in East Anglia. This construction is mainly the fabric that has survived to the present.

=== Fifth church (the Augustinian Abbey) ===
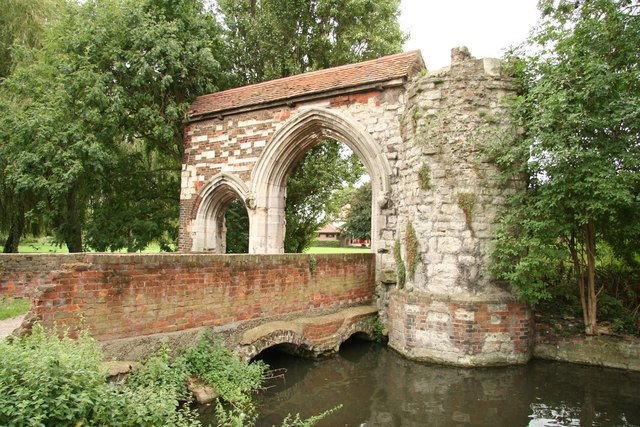
The surviving bridge and gatehouse of the abbey

In 1177, the abbey was re-founded once more, this time as an Augustinian priory with 16 canons, by Henry II as part of his penance for the murder of Thomas Becket. The rebuilding, in the Early English style, made the abbey far more extensive than the original Norman establishment, as can be seen today from traces in the abbey grounds. Those parts of the Norman church east of the Norman crossing were demolished, and a new church, with its own nave, a second pair of transepts and a further tower at the new crossing, were constructed. The Norman nave was retained as a parish church, divided from the new work by a screen. The whole building was now longer than Winchester Cathedral. A cloister was built to the north of the new nave. A short passage that led into the cloister still exists; this, and a fourteenth-century gatehouse, are the only surviving monastic buildings.

In 1184, Henry raised the status of the church to an abbey; he appointed an abbot and the number of canons was increased to 24. The completed abbey was finally re-dedicated on 30 September 1242, by William de Raley, Bishop of Norwich. The Holy Cross attracted many pilgrims and the Abbey became a popular place for overnight stays for kings and other notables hunting in Waltham Forest. Henry VIII was a frequent visitor and is said to have had a house or lodge at Romeland, adjacent to the abbey. During their summer progress of 1532, Henry and Queen Anne Boleyn stayed at Waltham Abbey for five days.

=== The Dissolution ===
Waltham was the last abbey in England to be dissolved. On 23 March 1540, the last abbot, Robert Fuller, surrendered the abbey and its estates to Henry's commissioners, the annual income from which was valued at £1,079, 12 shillings and one penny. In return, the abbot received a generous pension in the form of estates with an annual income of £200; the prior received an annuity of £20 and sixteen canons each received between £5 and £10 depending on seniority. Thomas Tallis, who had taken up a post as a senior "singing-man" (often interpreted as choir master) in the autumn of 1538, was awarded 20 shillings in outstanding wages and 20 shillings "reward". Tallis went on from Waltham to a post in the choir at Canterbury Cathedral. The Holy Cross disappeared without trace at this time. King Henry suggested Waltham as one of the new cathedrals for the Church of England, but this proposal was not implemented. In 1541, the king leased the manor of Waltham to Sir Anthony Denny, a prominent member of the Privy chamber and a confidant of the king. When Denny died in 1549, his estates passed to his widow Joan and in 1553 she bought the manor of Waltham outright; she died in the same year. The manor then passed to her son Henry, who died in 1574 leaving two sons; the elder Robert, died in 1576 and was succeeded by Edward Denny, who became Baron Denny of Waltham in 1604 and Earl of Norwich in 1626. Edward reused the stones from the demolished Gothic choir and chancel (the fifth church) for the sumptuous Abbey House which he built to the north of the churchyard; the Norman remnant of the nave continued in use as the town's parish church.

=== Later architectural history ===
In 1553, shortly after the demolition of the 12th-century choir, crossing and chancel, the 11th-century Norman tower at the east end of the nave collapsed. It was replaced by a new tower at the opposite end of the church, abutting the 14th-century west wall and straddling the main doorway. Work commenced in 1556 and was completed in the following year; it was the only church tower built in England during the reign of Queen Mary I.

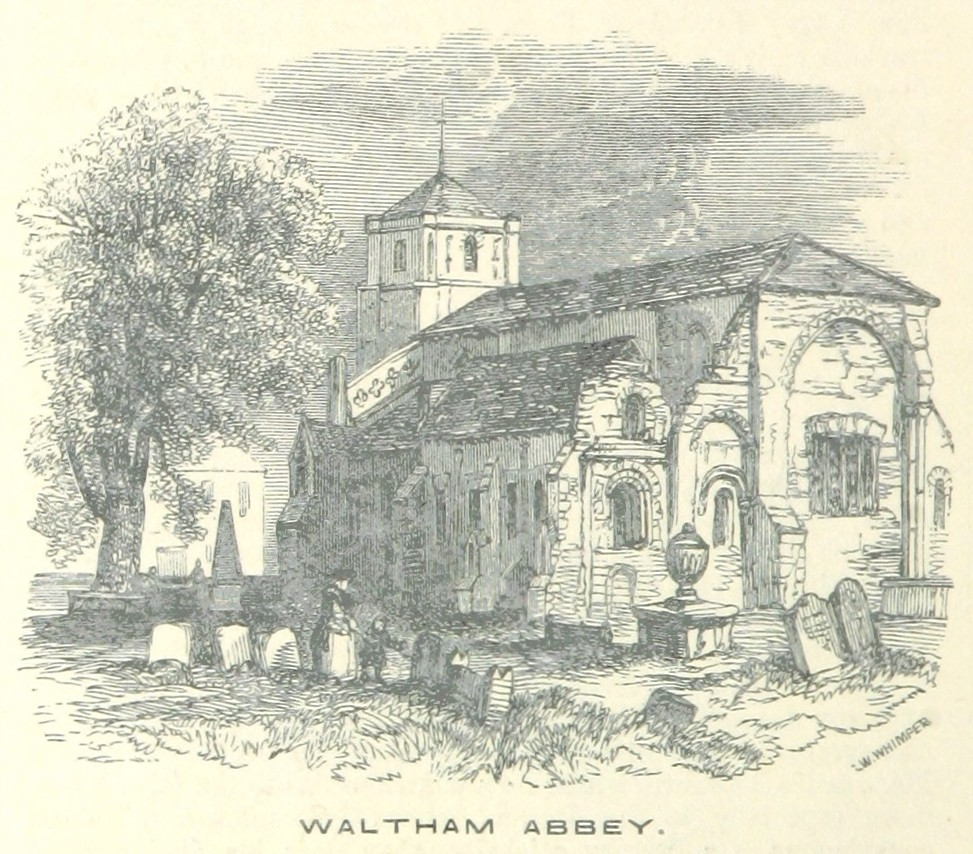
Waltham Abbey depicted in 1851, before the rebuilding works

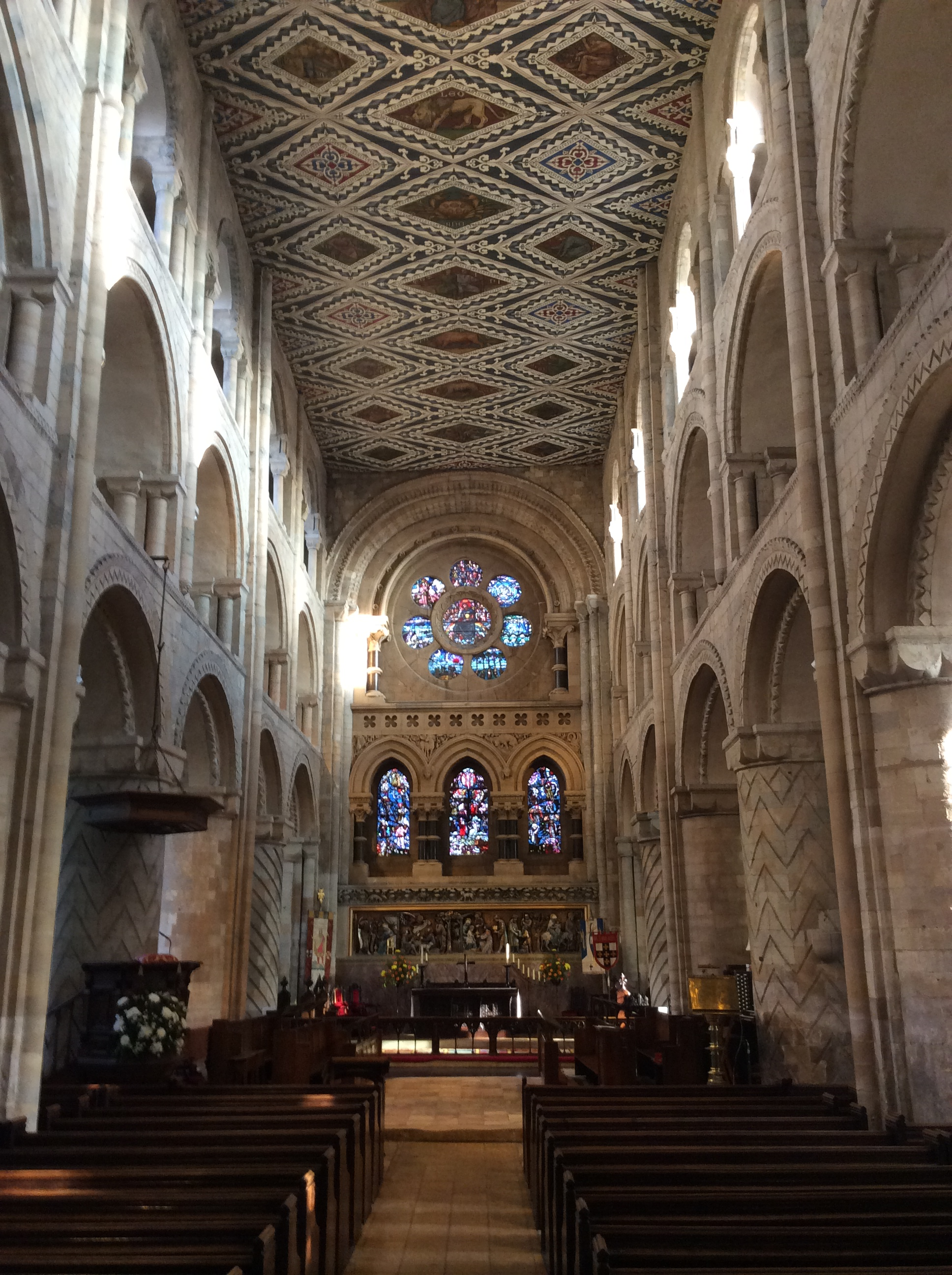
Burges's East Wall and Zodiac Ceiling

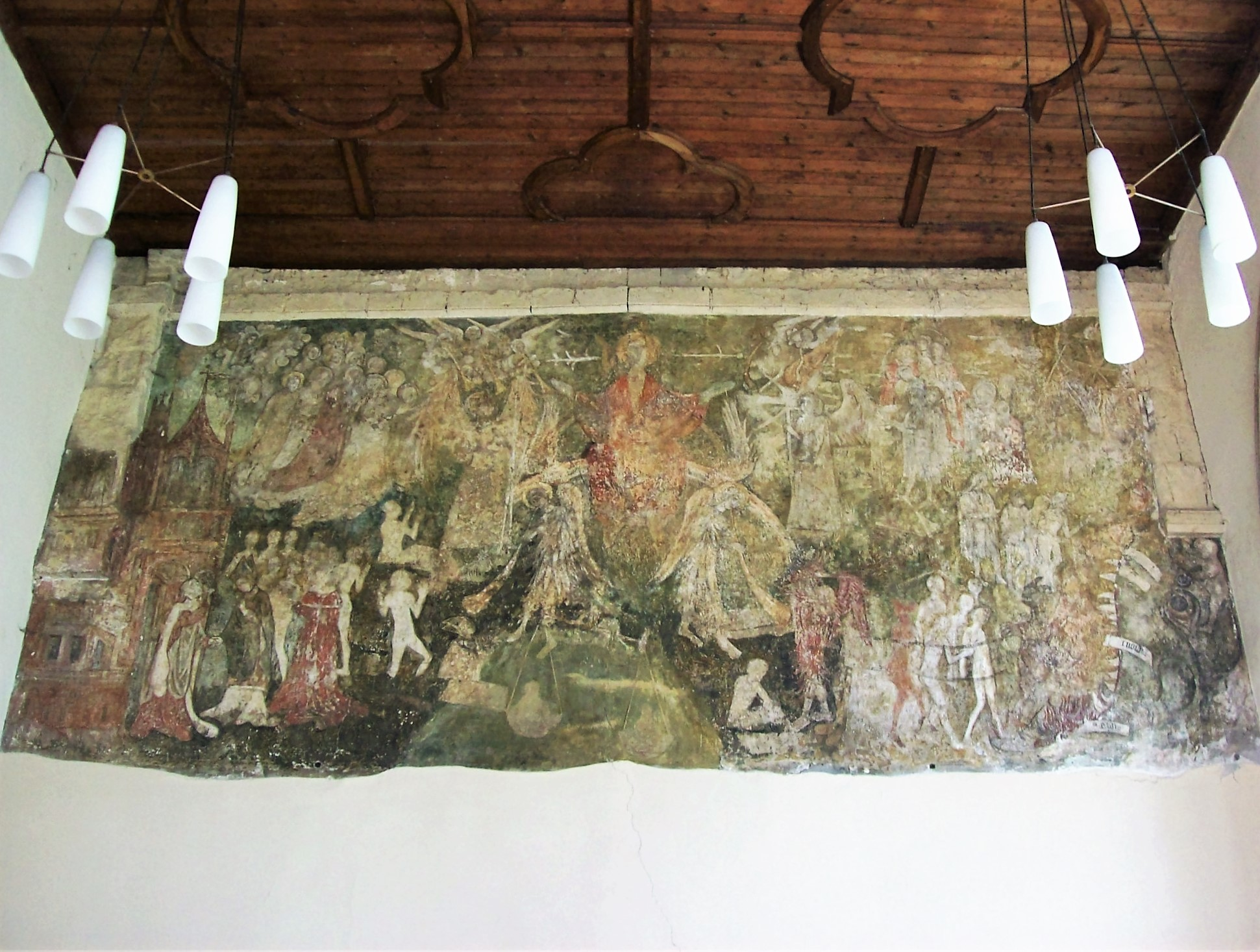
The 15th-century doom painting in the Lady Chapel

In 1859, the architect William Burges was appointed to undertake a restoration of the site and a refurbishment of the interior. The restoration was extensive; the removal of pews and galleries from the south and west sides, a new ceiling (painted with signs of the zodiac as at Peterborough Cathedral), a new chancel and significant re-building. The designs were exhibited at the Royal Academy. Work was completed by 1876. In the view of Burges's biographer, J. Mordaunt Crook, "(Burges's interior) meets the Middle Ages as an equal." The architectural historian Nikolaus Pevsner said that Burges's remodelling was carried out "with all the robust ugliness which that architect liked". The revised 2007, edition of his book takes a more sympathetic view, describing Burges' work as "pioneering (and) powerful". In the last year of the restoration, a 15th-century doom painting was discovered under whitewash on the east wall of the Lady Chapel. Further, more sensitive, restoration was undertaken in 1964.

The Abbey's stained glass includes early work by Edward Burne-Jones in the rose window and lancets of the east wall, and Archibald Keightley Nicholson in the Lady Chapel. The Lady Chapel has three windows by Nicholson, depicting the Annunciation, the Nativity and the Presentation of Christ in the Temple. Work on a fourth – intended to depict the Epiphany – was interrupted by the Second World War and never resumed. In April 1941, a 500 kg German parachute mine exploded in a field nearby at Romeland, destroying most of the windows on the north side of the church. In March 1945, a V-2 rocket landed in Highbridge Street, destroying the "Bellringers Window" in the tower; a detailed hand-tinted photograph of the window, discovered in 2007, may eventually allow the window to be recreated.

In 2003 the church was attacked by a man armed with two small axes, resulting in an estimated £200,000 worth of damage.

== King Harold's tomb ==
Harold stopped to pray at Waltham on his way south from the Battle of Stamford Bridge to fight William of Normandy; the battle-cry of the English troops at Hastings was "Holy Cross". According to Gesta Guillelmi, an account of the battle written by William of Poitiers in the 1070s, Harold's body was handed over to William Malet, a companion of William the Conqueror for burial; Duke William refused an offer by Harold's mother, Gytha, to exchange Harold's corpse for its weight in gold. The account also relates that some Normans remarked "in jest" that "he who guarded the coast with such insensate zeal should be buried by the sea shore", but does not say that this was actually done. Another account, the Carmen de Hastingae Proelio, thought to have been written only months after the battle, says that he was buried under a cliff top cairn, but this version does not appear in any other account.

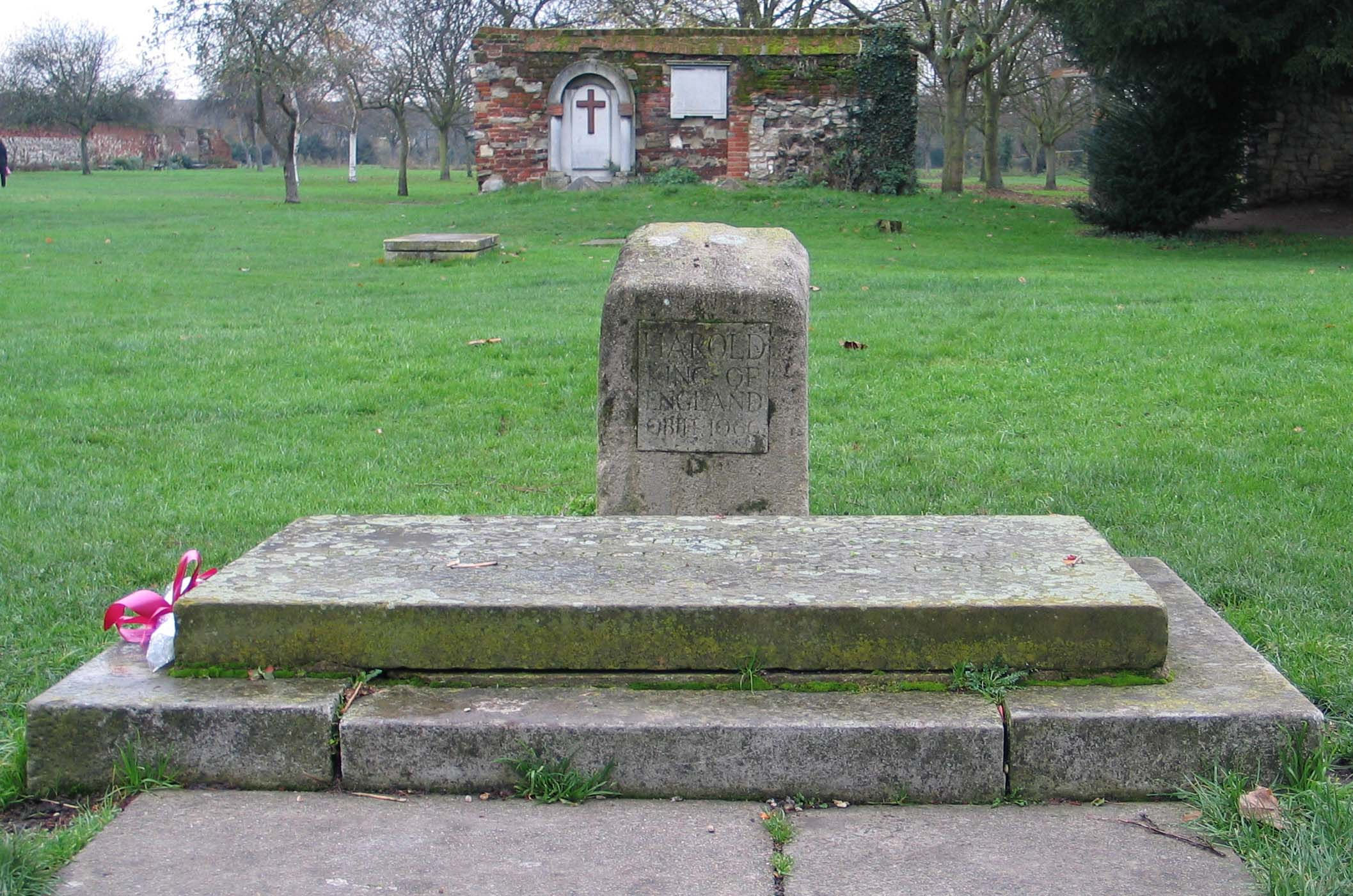
Reputed tomb of King Harold II under the site of the High Altar

William of Malmesbury wrote in the Gesta regum Anglorum in 1125, that the refusal to accept Gytha's gold simply meant that Harold's body was handed over without payment, and that it was taken from the battlefield to Waltham for burial. This version is supported by the Roman de Rou, written by Wace in the 1160s. The final and most detailed medieval account comes from the Waltham Chronicle. The author describes how two canons from Waltham, Osgod Cnoppe and Aethelric Childemaister, accompanied Harold from Waltham to Hastings. After the battle, they asked permission to recover Harold's body, which could only be identified by his concubine, Edith Swanneck, who recognised "secret marks". From Hastings the body was brought to Waltham and buried under the floor of the church. This story was related to the author of the Chronicle when he was a boy, by the elderly Sacristan Turketil, who claimed to have himself been a boy at Waltham when Harold arrived en route from Stamford Bridge, and later witnessed the interment of the king. The author himself claims to have seen Harold's body being disinterred and moved twice during the rebuilding work which started in 1090.

In 1177, the Waltham became an Augustinian foundation, and the new incumbents published Vita Haroldi ("The Life of Harold") soon afterwards, which records a legend that Harold survived the battle and retired as a hermit to either Chester or Canterbury; it is thought that the motive for this was to distract attention away from Harold's tomb in the church, as he was still a politically sensitive figure to the Norman ruling class.

In the 18th century, the historian David Hume wrote that Harold had been buried by the high altar in the Norman church and moved to the choir of the later Augustinian abbey. Visitors were shown a stone slab bearing the inscription "Hic iacet Haroldus infelix" ("Here lies Harold the unfortunate"), although it had been destroyed when that part of the abbey was demolished at the Dissolution. An earlier 18th-century reference comes from Daniel Defoe's A tour thro' the whole island of Great Britain. In his description of Essex, Defoe mentions Waltham Abbey where "the ruins of the abbey remain; and tho’ antiquity is not my proper business, I cou’d not but observe, that King Harold, slain in the great battle in Sussex against William the Conqueror, lies buried here; his body being begg’d by his mother, the Conqueror allow’d it to be carried hither; but no monument was, as I can find, built for him, only a flat grave-stone, on which was engraven, Harold Infoelix."

== Organ ==
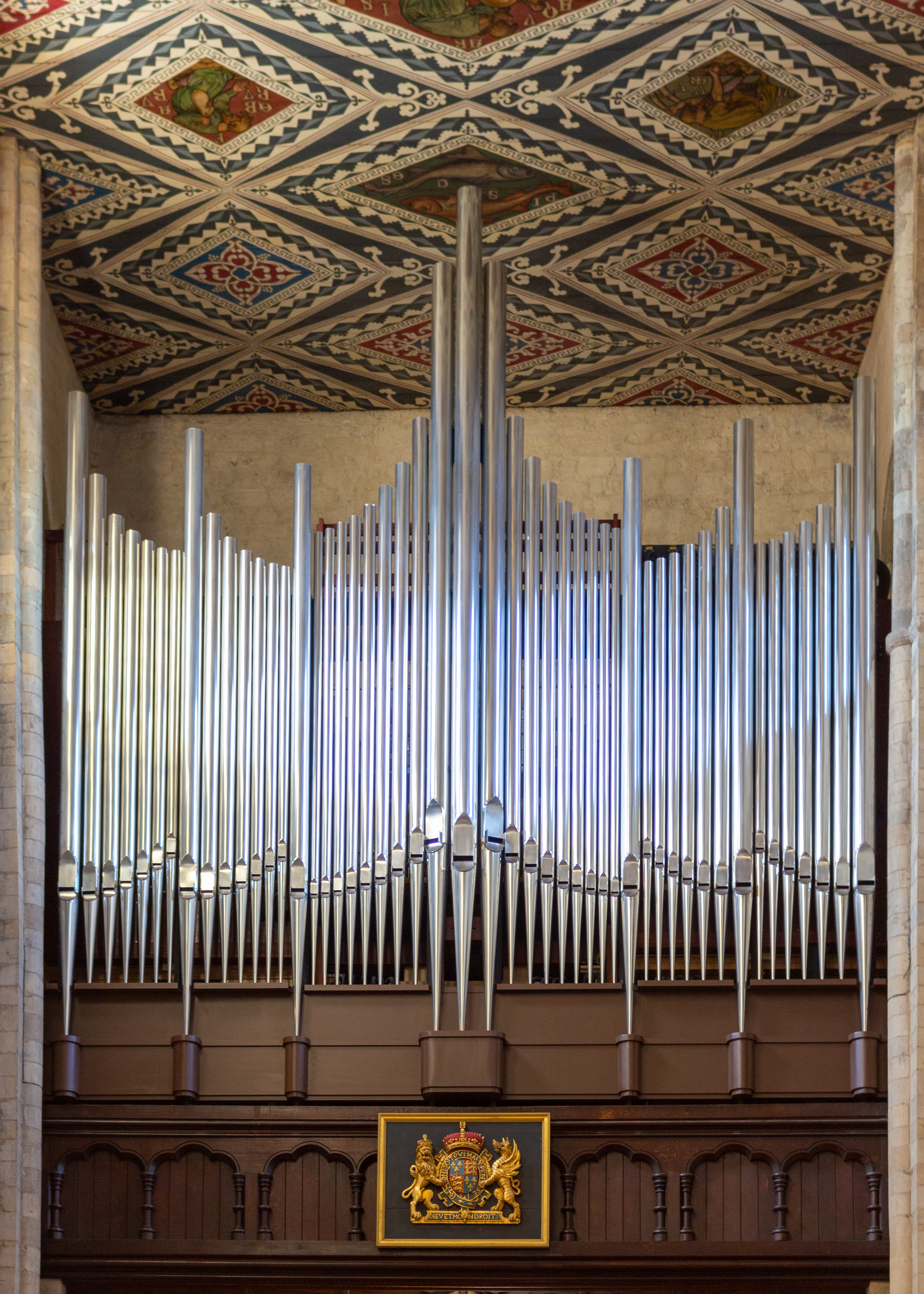
The organ in 2022

At the Dissolution in 1540, an inventory states that there was "a lyttel payre of organes" in the Lady Chapel and in the Choir, "a great large payre of organes" and also "a lesser payre". The parts of the Abbey that housed these instruments were demolished shortly afterwards. The church currently contains a large 3 manual organ. A plaque on the organ case has the inscription, "Flight & Robson 1827, the gift of (Thomas) Leverton Esq.", although this instrument dates from 1819. It was fully rebuilt in 1860 by J. W. Walker & Sons Ltd. In 1879, the organ was dismantled and rebuilt at the eastern end of the North Aisle, but was finally rebuilt in the West Gallery in 1954, with the console in the chancel. The "Waltham Abbey Church Heritage Organ Appeal" was launched in July 2008 to replace the existing organ, which was deemed to have come to the end of its useful life.

Following the success of the Organ Appeal, Mander Organs installed the new instrument in 2019. The organ includes a new principal chorus on the Great division, and a new 32-foot reed on the Pedal.

The carol "Hark! The Herald Angels Sing" was first heard sung to a melody from Felix Mendelssohn's Festgesang in the church on Christmas Day 1855 with William Hayman Cummings, who made the adaptation, at the organ.

=== Organists ===
Its organists have included:

- Thomas Tallis
- Polly Thompson
- William Hayman Cummings, 1847–1853
- Mr. Gibbons
- Mr. Banks
- Joseph Chalk, from 1859
- Norman Rimmer
- Jamie Hitel
- Stuart Nicholson
- Stephen Bullamore, 2005–2013
- Jonathan Lilley, appointed 2013

== Notable clergy ==
- Patrick Hobson; rector, 1988 to 1998

== Notable burials ==
- King Harold (c. 1022 – 14 October 1066),
- Elizabeth of Rhuddlan (1282–1316), daughter of Edward I
- Hugh de Neville
- Honora Grey Denny, mother of Edward Denny, 1st Earl of Norwich

== See also ==
- List of English abbeys, priories and friaries serving as parish churches
