= David Knowles (journalist) =

British journalist and podcaster (1991–2024)

- Born: 22 September 1991; Ealing, London, United Kingdom
- Died: 8 September 2024 (aged 32); Gibraltar
- Education: Durham University (BA, MA), City, University of London (MA)
- Occupation: Journalist

David Joseph Knowles (22 September 1991 – 8 September 2024) was a British journalist and podcaster known for his reporting on Ukraine.

== Early life and education ==
David Joseph Knowles was born in Ealing, London, on 22 September 1991, to Kaye, a former violinist turned music teacher, and Peter, a broadcast journalist. His paternal grandfather, Alan Knowles, was a journalist with the BBC in Manchester, while his great-grandfather, Frank Knowles, worked for the Bolton Evening News.

Knowles attended Elthorne Park High School in Hanwell and Tiffin School in Kingston upon Thames, before studying theology at Durham University. At Durham, he was a member of University College and obtained a first-class degree.

A keen performer, Knowles was a member of the National Youth Theatre as a teenager and played several instruments, including the viola. While at Durham, he sang as a tenor with the university choirs and was a member of the sketch ensemble The Durham Revue.

Knowles completed an Erasmus year at the University of Strasbourg as part of his undergraduate degree. He later earned an MA in Biblical Studies at the College of St Hild and St Bede and an MA in Digital Journalism at City, University of London. He was a fluent French speaker and studied six ancient languages, including Biblical Hebrew.

== Career ==
Knowles began his journalism career in 2016, producing social media videos for MailOnline, before spending three years in a similar role at the World Economic Forum in Geneva from 2017 to 2020. He joined The Telegraph as Deputy Head of Social Media in 2020, and was promoted to Head of Social Media in 2021.

It was during this latter role that he began work on the podcast Ukraine: The Latest, launched in response to the 2022 Russian invasion of Ukraine. Knowles was later appointed Head of Audio Development in 2023 and Senior Audio Journalist and Presenter in 2024.

In a 2024 interview, Knowles explained that the podcast began as an experiment using Twitter Spaces, where the paper attracted tens of thousands of listeners during major political events. When Russia invaded Ukraine, he hosted a live session on the day of the invasion that drew a large audience, leading to the creation of the ongoing podcast series.

As one of the podcast's hosts, Knowles made four visits to Ukraine to report on the conflict. The series became one of the world's most-listened-to news podcasts covering the war, and by the time of his death had received nearly 100 million downloads.

In 2023, Knowles was included on the Russian Ministry of Foreign Affairs' list of sanctioned British media workers, effectively banning him from entering Russia.

== Awards and recognition ==
- 2022 – Ukraine: The Latest was shortlisted for the Innovation of the Year award at the British Journalism Awards.
- 2024 – Ukraine: The Latest won Best News Podcast at the Publisher Podcast Awards.
- 2024 – Knowles posthumously received the Public Service Journalism Award at the British Journalism Awards.

== Death ==
Knowles died in Gibraltar on 8 September 2024. His death was investigated by police in Gibraltar, assisted by UK counter-terrorism officers. It was later determined that he had died of cardiac arrest.

His funeral was held at St Bride's Church in Fleet Street, London, which has a long association with journalism. It was also livestreamed online. His casket, decorated with flowers in the colours of the Ukrainian flag, was a gift from the Ukrainian Embassy in London.

== Personal life ==
Knowles had a younger brother, Andrew. He was a supporter of Bolton Wanderers F.C. and a fan of cricket, and co-founded the Larkhall Wanderers cricket team.
