= Patrick Hobson =

British Anglican clergyman (1933–2024)

The Reverend Canon Patrick Hobson MC
- Born: 15 August 1933
- Died: 29 September 2024 (aged 91)
- Military career
- Service years: 1951–1956
- Rank: Lieutenant
- Service number: 421516
- Unit: King's Regiment (Liverpool)
- Conflicts: Korean War
- Awards: Military Cross (1953)

Patrick John Bogan Hobson, MC (15 August 1933 – 29 September 2024) was a British Anglican clergyman and decorated British Army officer. After completing his schooling at 18, he entered the British Army to undertake his National Service. He was awarded the Military Cross for his service during the Korean War. He then studied law at the University of Cambridge, and worked as a district officer in the Colonial Service and then as a personnel manager. He later trained for ordination in the Church of England, and served in parish ministry from 1979 until he retired in 1998.

== Early life and education ==
Hobson was born on 15 August 1933 in Kingston-upon-Thames, Surrey, England. His father was a "collectors' trade supervisor". He was educated at the Tiffin School, an all-boys grammar school in Kingston upon Thames, where he became head boy.

== Military service ==
Hobson chose to join the British Army after school rather than deferring his National Service to after university. He was selected for officer training, which consisted of five months at the officer cadet training unit based at Eaton Hall, Cheshire. On 8 March 1952, he was commissioned as a second lieutenant in the King's Regiment (Liverpool).

At 19 years old and newly commissioned, he led a platoon on the front line during the Korean War. His platoon held an isolated position and he personally undertook more successful patrols with accurate reports than any other NCO or officer in his battalion; during one such patrol, he lost an eye. He was awarded the Military Cross (MC) "in recognition of gallant and distinguished services in Korea during the period 1st January to 30th June, 1953"; it was awarded for his service across the whole operational tour rather than for one instance of bravery.

On 5 November 1953, having completed his National Service, Hobson was transferred to the Army Emergency Reserve of Officers as a second lieutenant with seniority in that rank from 8 March 1952. He was promoted to acting lieutenant on 29 November 1953. On 14 April 1954, he transferred to the Territorial Army as a second lieutenant (acting lieutenant). He transferred to the Regular Army Reserve of Officers on 15 August 1956 as a lieutenant with seniority from 29 November 1953, thereby ending his active military service.

== Ordained ministry ==
Hobson became an Anglican lay reader in 1971. Having studied on the Southwark Ordination Course and then at Queen's College, Birmingham, he was ordained in the Church of England as a deacon in 1979 and as a priest in 1980. Following his curacy in Worcester, he served as rector of Clifton upon Teme, Lower Sapey and the Shelsleys, a group of parishes in the Diocese of Worcester from 1981 to 1988. Then, from 1988 to 1998, he was team rector of Waltham Abbey in the Diocese of Chelmsford. In 1995, he was appointed an honorary canon of Chelmsford Cathedral. In retirement, he attended St Giles' Church, Oxford, having moved to the city.

== Personal life ==
In 1959, Hobson married Pennington "Penny" Hopkins, having met her at the University of Oxford. Together they had three sons.

Hobson died on 29 September 2024, aged 91. His funeral was held at St Andrew's Church, Oxford, on 19 October 2024.
