= Elthorne Park High School =

Elthorne Park High School (EPHS)

Location
- Westlea Road; Hanwell; London, England, W7 2AH; United Kingdom; 51.50048°N 0.32931°W

Information
- Type: High school
- Motto: Achieving Excellence in a Learning Community
- Established: 1998 (current school)
- Local authority: Ealing
- Department for Education URN: 131310 Tables
- Ofsted: Reports
- Head teacher: Steve Ward
- Staff: 188
- Gender: Coeducational
- Age: 11 to 19
- Enrolment: 1603
- Student to teacher ratio: 16.9:1
- Education system: National Curriculum for England
- Hours in school day: 08:40–15:10 (16:10 with Period 6)
- Campus size: 2.27 Hectares, 0.0227 km²
- Colours: Burgundy, White, Yellow
- Slogan: Achieving excellence in a learning community
- Website: http://www.ephs.ealing.sch.uk

Elthorne Park High School (sometimes abbreviated to 'EPHS') is a secondary school located on Westlea Road, next to Boston Road (the A3002) in Hanwell, a town in the London Borough of Ealing. It provides education for pupils aged from 11 to 19 (i.e. Year 7 to 13).

== Developments ==
Elthorne became a Maths and Computing specialist school in September 2007, and its Sixth Form opened in September 2009.

It became an authorised IB World School in 2008 and once offered the International Baccalaureate Diploma Programme as its main pre-University course, as well as a variety of applied and vocational courses. However, this came to an end after three years as, despite many successes for the students after the first year, the IB was not proving popular with students and was found to be administratively cumbersome by staff.

In 2012 a decision was made to change the further education course to A-Levels to attract more students. After the decision was made, plans were created to build a new Sixth Form Block. After receiving confirmation from the Council and Local Residents, construction began in late April 2012. Construction was undertaken by Elliot UK. The new block was completed for the term commencing from September 2012/13 and is now in regular use.

As of 2014, Ealing Council announced plans to rebuild "C" block, the largest building in the school, in order to expand the school. The new building was designed by Re-Format LLP. Building began in September 2015 and its original plans were for it to be completed in September 2016 however, due to electrical problems, the block was delayed in opening until Easter 2017.

In early 2017, Clare Balding officially opened the new "C" block in a ceremony. Balding was toured around the school before revealing the plaque in the new hall.

In 2019, Elthorne was officially named an "Outstanding" school by Ofsted. This has since been upheld in Ofsted's latest report.

The schools sixth form provision expanded during the early 2020s with an additional purpose-built teaching building which was reported as completed in 2023. Ofstead subsequently confirmed the sixth form had massively expanded since their last inspection in 2019.

Elthorne also expanded its Additional Resource Provision (ARP) with Ealing Council, commissioning Francis Construction to construct a two storey block containing three classrooms, office facilities and a green roof.

On 4 and 5 March 2025, Ofsted conducted an ungraded inspection of the school. The report, published on 2 April 2025, concluded that Elthorne Park High School had maintained the standards identified during its previous inspection in 2019.

=== Environmental initiatives ===
In 2024, Elthorne Park High School received a Green Flag Award, as recorded by Ealing Council.

During the 2023–24 academic year, the school participated in an environmental project organised by the charity Trees for Cities. Members of the school's Eco Club contributed to the development of a biodiversity map, advised on tree species and helped plant 25 trees in the neighbouring park. Students also participated in workshops examining the urban heat island effect.

The school's environmental initiatives have also included sustainable building improvement including the aforementioned teaching block constructed by Francis Construction incorporated a green roof, with seven replacement trees planted as part of the development.

== History ==
Elthorne High School opened in September 1975, merging two schools: Walpole Grammar School and Bordeston Boys' School. Those who joined in 1975 were based at the Bordeston site, along with the 3rd and 5th-year Bordeston boys. The remaining pupils were based at the Cranmer site.

Bordeston Secondary Modern School, which was for boys, opened in 1932. It played a significant role in the educational history of the area, alongside other schools like Drayton Manor Grammar School (Now Drayton Manor High School) The Bordeston school eventually merged with the others to form Elthorne High School.

Elthorne High School closed in 1986 due to declining enrolment and other pressures, which led to a community campaign to save the school. The school was later reopened in 1998 under its current name, Elthorne Park High School, due to it being situated right next to Elthorne Park. The new school offers education to students aged 11 to 18, including a sixth form. It was inspected by OFSTED for the first time in 2004.

== Catering ==
The school was catered for by Pabulum, who specialise in catering for various educational facilities in the UK. Students were able to purchase a variety of hot and cold foods and drinks at break and lunch using their personal ID cards which connects to their online lunch-money balance. The company faced criticism by some students and parents for its often unhealthy snacks (including hot dogs, pizza and sausage rolls) served at break for additional profit. Some items had been dropped from break-time service later on to rectify the concern for students' health and well-being.

The school now is catered for by Aramark, who provide very similar services to previous caterers.

== Notable former pupils ==
- Chloe Kelly, footballer
- Molly Manning Walker, filmmaker
- Jonathan Slater, Rode from Lands End to John O'Groats
- David Knowles (1991–2024), British journalist known for the podcast Ukraine: The Latest
- Jourdan Dunn, Actress and Model
