= Roddy Elias =

Royal Navy officer

Commander Peter Rodney "Roddy" Elias (27 February 1921 – 24 January 2015) was a Royal Navy officer who played an important role in the hunt for the German battleship Bismarck, for which he was awarded the Distinguished Service Cross.
