= Frank Dobson (lichenologist) =

British lichenologist (died 2021)

Frank S. Dobson
- Born: June 11, 1934; New Malden, UK
- Died: December 19, 2021 (aged 87)
- Scientific career
- Fields: lichenology; businessman

Frank S. Dobson was a UK lichenologist and author of Lichens: An Illustrated Guide to the British and Irish species, the major guide to UK and Irish lichens from the late 20th century into the early 21st century.

== Personal life and business career ==
Dobson lived in New Malden for all his life. He attended Tiffin School where a teacher inspired his interest in botany, although his academic progress was affected by undiagnosed dyslexia. He worked in photography, initially in the family business, and became a skilled photographer. He later developed specialist printing and publishing enterprises, founding Richmond Publishing Co. Ltd. in 1970. He was a member of the photographic consultative committees of Twickenham College and the London College of Printing and other organisations involved in training within the printing industry.

His personal life, with his wife Mary and six daughters, had space for a number of additional interests including sailing. He was a member of the England Olympic team in 1960, competing in the 50 metres Free Pistol event.

Frank S. Dobson died in December 2021.

== Lichenology ==
Dobson became an expert and an enthusiastic lichenologist, namely the study of organisms that are a symbiotic association of a microscopic alga (or a cyanobacterium) with a filamentous fungus. Lichens are often the first life to colonise surfaces such as rocks, trees and man-made structures. He became expert in field identification and was the author of Lichens: An Illustrated Guide to the British and Irish species, first published in 1979 which had reached its 7th revised edition by 2018. Dobson also recorded lichen distributions, particularly in his home area of Surrey and was a charismatic teacher, influencing many future amateur and professional lichenologists. He ran courses about lichens for the Field Studies Council and the British Lichen Society.

Dobson was a member of the British Lichen Society. He was the Treasurer and a member of the BLS Council for many years. He was elected president for 1992–1994.

== Honours and awards ==
Dobson was made an Honorary member of the British Lichen Society in 1997 and received the society's Ursula Duncan award in 2005.

In August 2022, the British Lichen Society dedicated the month to commemorating Dobson, especially his contribution to the lichenology community. This included a meeting at Hampton Park, Southampton and Puttenham Common in his home area as well as over 20 other field meetings across England, Wales and Scotland.

== Publications ==
Dobson was the author of several other books in addition to Lichens: An Illustrated Guide to the British and Irish species. These included:

- Frank S. Dobson, A Field Key to Lichens on Trees (2013), 110pp ISBN 978-0-9542324-6-7
- Frank S. Dobson, A Field Key to Coastal and Seashore Lichens (2011), 100 pp ISBN 978 0 9542324 5
- Frank S. Dobson, A Field Key to Churchyard Lichens (2003)
