= David Muhammad =

Trinidadian author and writer

David Muhammad is a Trinidadian author, writer and Nation of Islam leader.

== Background ==
He was born on April 4, 1970, in Somerset, England.

In 1978, he returned with his Trinidadian parents to the Caribbean. Today, he is the Trinidad and Eastern Caribbean Representative of Louis Farrakhan and the Nation of Islam.

Muhammad returned to the United Kingdom in 1991. In 1992, he joined the Nation of Islam at the NOI South London mosque. After returning to Trinidad he began lecturing in December, and began the NOI Trinidad study group in January 1993. Muhammad has lectured in Trinidad and Tobago, Antigua, Guyana, Grenada, Barbados, St. Lucia, St. Vincent, St. Croix, London, New York City, Miami, Houston, Chicago and Detroit.

In 1996, he ventured into radio. Over the years, he has managed to consistently top MFO surveys, peaking at a 14% listenership share. Muhammad has appeared on television, radio and newspaper features across the Caribbean. In 2013 he was listed as one of the Top 10 Personalities of the Year by the New York City-based Caribbean People Newspaper. On the same day he was featured in the UK Gleaner newspaper based in England speaking on Caribbean Unity.

He has been the manager of the Trinidad & Tobago National Senior Men’s Football Team, the “Soca Warriors” for 87 matches from 2007 to 2011 and was reappointed in 2013.

He is the host of The Black Agenda, a Trinidad and Tobago-based radio show that discusses racial issues in the Caribbean. Prior to joining Street 91.9FM, Muhammad worked at Power 102FM for 10 years from 2002 to 2012; WACK Radio from 2012 to 2013, and has also hosted programs on Radio Trinidad 730AM, Ebony 104FM and I 95.5FM.

== Publications ==
Muhammad is the author of the book The Black Studies Anthology covering the subject areas of Black history, its economics, philosophy, psychology, education, and creative expression. In its first year, some 1700 copies were sold. Another edition is to be launched in 2015. He is a contributing writer to the T&T Mirror and Final Call newspaper, the most widely circulated international Black publication. His interest in Black consciousness became activated and focused when he began studying sociology at age 17.

== Bibliography ==
- Muhammad, David, The Black Studies Anthology, Muhammad's Study Group, 1998, 157 pages.
