= The Black Agenda =

Trinidadian and Tobagonian radio show

The Black Agenda is a Trinidad and Tobago-based radio show hosted by David Muhammad that discusses racial issues in the Caribbean. It is broadcast on 91.9FM from Port of Spain, Trinidad.

== Notes ==
Muhammad, David. Black Studies. UWI Press, 2014, p. 7.
