= David Dowdy =

American infectious disease epidemiologist

Academic background
- Education: BS, 1999, Duke University; ScM, PhD, 2008, Johns Hopkins Bloomberg School of Public Health; MD, 2008, Johns Hopkins School of Medicine
- Thesis: Impact and cost-effectiveness of improved diagnostics for tuberculosis in high-burden countries (2008)

Academic work
- Institutions: Johns Hopkins Bloomberg School of Public Health
- Main interests: tuberculosis

David Wesley Dowdy is an American infectious disease epidemiologist. He is the B. Frank and Kathleen Polk Professor at Johns Hopkins Bloomberg School of Public Health.

== Early life and education ==
Dowdy earned his Bachelor of Science degree from Duke University in 1999 before enrolling at Johns Hopkins Bloomberg School of Public Health for his Master's degree, PhD, and Medical degree. He completed his PhD under the guidance of Richard Chaisson, a tuberculosis and HIV expert, who encouraged him to study epidemiological modeling of tuberculosis.

== Career ==
After graduating in 2008, Dowdy completed his medical residency in internal medicine at the University of California, San Francisco, before returning to Johns Hopkins as a faculty member in 2011. While a medical resident, his abstract research titled Mortality Trends among Socially-Disadvantaged ART-Eligible Patients received the Johns Hopkins General Internal Medicine Diane Becker Award for achievement in clinical epidemiology and prevention research. As an assistant professor in the Department of Epidemiology, Dowdy led a study which examined how a reduction of tuberculosis transmission in geographic “hotspots” could lead to an overall reduction in transmission on a broader scale. He later received the inaugural B. Frank and Kathleen Polk Associate Professorship, an endowment aimed at supporting junior faculty who show great potential for future contributions to public health.

In recognition of his academic achievements, Dowdy was one of the 36 early-career faculty members to earn a 2020 Johns Hopkins Catalyst Award.
