= David von Grafenberg =

French novelist

David von Grafenberg is a French novelist. He lives in Paris and works in the fashion industry. His first novel, Prostitué, appeared in 2007, followed by Surveillant and Madame de X.
