= Climate migration =

Persons fleeing from climate change effects

Climate migration is a subset of climate-related mobility that refers to movement driven by the impact of sudden or gradual climate-exacerbated disasters, such as "abnormally heavy rainfalls, prolonged droughts, desertification, environmental degradation, or sea-level rise and cyclones". Gradual shifts in the environment tend to impact more people than sudden disasters. The majority of climate migrants move internally within their own countries, though a smaller number of climate-displaced people also move across national borders.

Climate change gives rise to migration on a large, global scale. The United Nations High Commissioner for Refugees (UNHCR) estimates that an average of 20 million people are forcibly displaced to other areas in countries all over the world by weather-related events every year. Climate-related disasters disproportionately affect marginalized populations, who are often facing other structural challenges in climate-vulnerable regions and countries. The 2021 White House Report on the Impact of Climate Change on Migration underscored the multifaceted impacts of climate change and climate-related migration, ranging from destabilizing vulnerable and marginalized communities, exacerbating resource scarcity, to igniting political tension.

Few existing international frameworks and regional and domestic legal regimes provide adequate protection to climate migrants. However, as the UN Dispatch noted, "people who have been uprooted because of climate change exist all over the world – even if the international community has been slow to recognize them as such." As a result, climate migration has been described as "the world's silent crisis", contrasting its global pervasiveness with its lack of recognition and investigation. Estimates on climate-related displacement vary, but all point to an alarming trend. Some projections estimate that around 200 million people will be displaced by climate-related disasters by 2050. Some even estimate up to 1 billion migrants by 2050, but these take ecological threats, including conflict and civil unrest as well as disasters, into account.

== Causes ==
Climate migrants refer to those who engage in movement driven by the impact of sudden or gradual climate change, such as "abnormally heavy rainfalls, prolonged droughts, desertification, environmental degradation, or sea-level rise and cyclones". The intensification of natural disasters caused by climate change, has the potential to impact many populations, leading to a significant number of climate migrants. Over the past 50 years, the frequency of disasters has increased by a factor of 5. In addition to more frequent and severe disasters, global warming-induced rising temperatures will lead to more prevalent droughts and snow and ice melting, resulting in higher sea levels.

Gradual shifts in the environment tend to impact more people than sudden disasters. Between 1979 and 2008, storms impacted 718 million individuals, whereas droughts affected approximately 1.6 billion. Sudden climatic events like severe storms and natural disasters may destroy critical infrastructure, flood neighborhoods, disrupt transit systems, overburden medical centers, cause food and water shortages, destabilize energy plants, and jeopardize human health and well-being. These events can severely harm communities, making recovery a challenging process. Gradual impacts, such as famines, droughts, and other resource shortages and economic damages brought about by climate change may cause conflict, political instability, climate gentrification, and accumulated negative health effects due to exposure to unhealthy environments. Droughts and slowly rising temperatures, have more mixed effects, but are more likely to lead to longer-term changes.

Rising sea levels are a frequently addressed concern in environmental discussions. Sea levels are estimated to rise between 90 and 180 centimeters (roughly 3 and 6 feet) by 2100. This means that, progressively, land areas will become submerged. To put it in perspective, on average each year, the sea level has risen 3.7 mm. These data reveal significant threats to coastal cities and ecosystems, potentially displacing many humans.

== Climate justice and adaptation ==
There are several ways of looking at migration and environmental change. Migration can be a human rights issue or a security issue. The human rights framing suggests developing protection frameworks for migrants. Increased border security may be an implication of treating migration as a national security issue. It is possible to combine both approaches, taking national concerns into account in accordance with human rights.

Climate adaptation projects in preparation for climate hazards and as a response to climate change may increase the climate resilience of communities. However, these projects may inadvertently contribute to climate gentrification—a process where actions to address climate risks lead to the displacement of lower-socioeconomic groups by wealthier communities. Inner coastal cities and areas at higher elevations, traditionally occupied by less affluent populations, are now becoming more desirable due to increasing risks like sea level rise and extreme weather events affecting lower-lying wealthy waterfront properties.

By bolstering resilience, such projects may reduce the degree of migration people feel compelled to undertake due to climate-related challenges. Varying levels of investment are made in supporting the adaptation, resilience, and mobility of neighborhoods, municipalities, and nations in the face of climate change and consequent environmental migration. This is especially important to consider since small island states, rural populations, people of color, low-income communities, the elderly, people with disabilities, coastal urban populations, food and housing insecure households, and developing countries are especially vulnerable to the worst effects of the climate crisis and therefore to environmental migration. Just as individuals and countries do not contribute equally to climate change, they also do not experience the negative effects of the crisis equally. Both short- and long-term impacts of climate change bring under-prepared communities environmental harm and exacerbate existing inequities. People with livelihoods tied to the environment, like those in agriculture, fisheries, and coast-dependent businesses, are also at risk of relocation or job loss due to climate change. If communities cannot adapt adequately, migration might emerge as the primary response.

Climate migrants may migrate internally within their own country or to another country in response to climate change. Most climate migration is internal, meaning movement occurs within an individual's own country, and they do not cross international borders. In 2022 alone, weather-related events led to nearly 32 million internal displacements. In poor countries where individuals are more vulnerable to disasters due to inadequate climate adaptation, individuals will also often lack resources for long-distance migration.

In some cases, climate change constrains migration and people may lose the means to migrate, leading to a net decrease in migration. The migration that does take place is seen as voluntary and economically motivated. In some cases climate change could also exacerbate economic insecurity or political instability as causes for migration beyond temperatures and extreme weather events. Who moves and who stays when affected by climate change often falls along lines of race and class, as mobility requires some amount of wealth.

== Global statistics ==
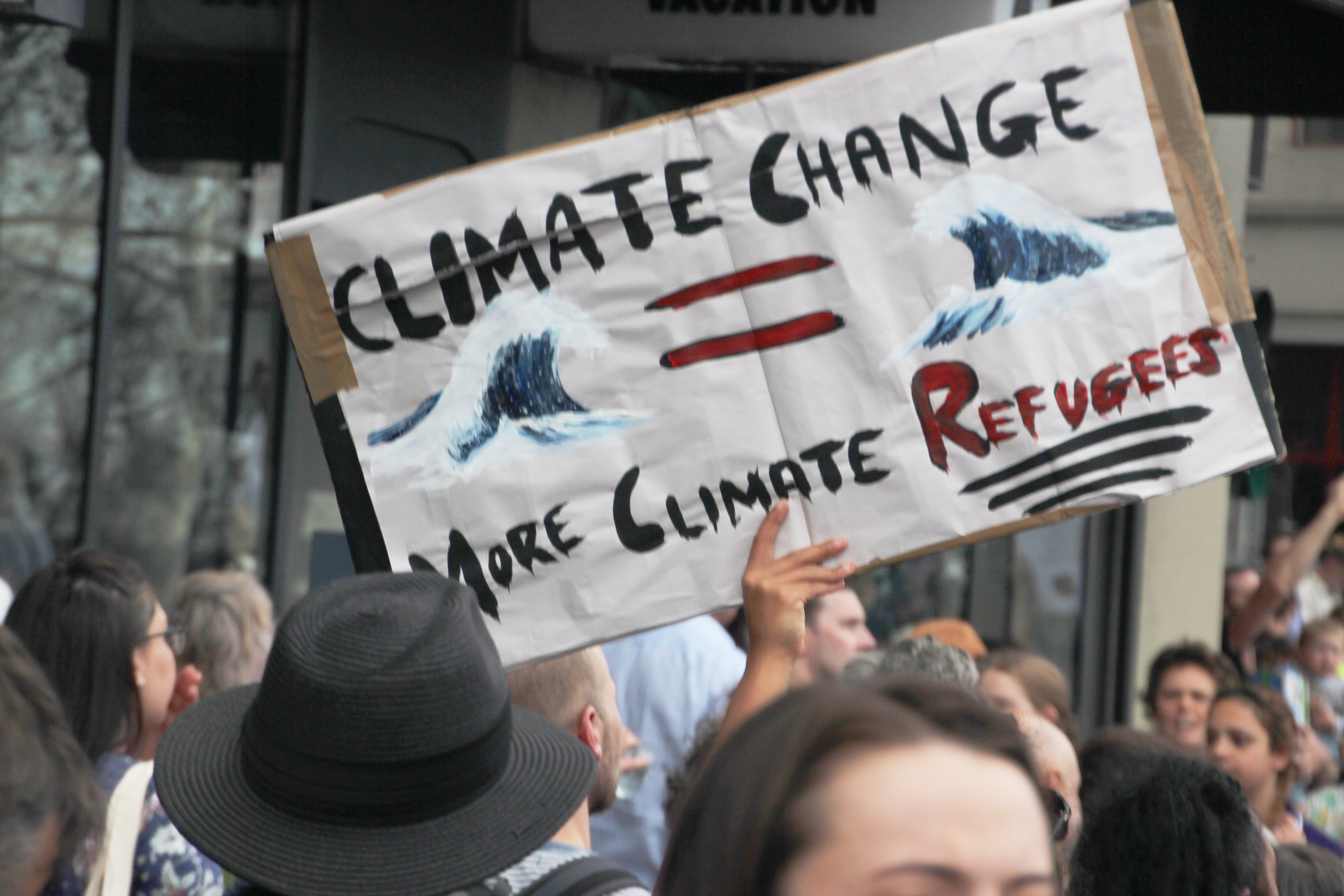
An activist holding a sign "Climate change = more climate refugees" at the Melbourne Global climate strike on Sep 20, 2019

In 1990, the Intergovernmental Panel on Climate Change declared that the greatest single consequence of climate change could be migration, 'with millions of people displaced by shoreline erosion, coastal flooding and severe drought'.

The most common projection is that the world will have 150–200 million people displaced by climate change by 2050. Variations of this claim have been made in influential reports on climate change by the IPCC and the Stern Review on the Economics of Climate Change, as well as by NGOs such as Friends of the Earth, Greenpeace Germany (Jakobeit and Methmann 2007) and Christian Aid; and inter-governmental organisations such as the Council of Europe, UNESCO, and UNHCR. There has even been an estimate as high as 1.2 billion attributing climate migration to ecological threats, including conflict and civil unrest. This acknowledges that such ecological challenges might instigate conflicts, such as regions disputing over water access. Other reports with more conservative estimates focus solely on the direct effects of climate.

Predictions on climate-induced migration often reflect the population in at-risk regions rather than the actual expected number of migrants, and not considering adaptation strategies or varying levels of vulnerability. However, Hein de Haas has argued that to link the climate change issue "with the specter of mass migration is a dangerous practice based on myth rather than fact. The use of apocalyptic migration forecasts to support the case for urgent action on climate change is not only intellectually dishonest, but also puts the credibility of those using this argument - as well as the broader case for climate change action - seriously at risk". He argued that while "climate change is unlikely to cause mass migration" this also overlooks the fact that the implications of environmental adversity are most severe for the most vulnerable populations who lack the means to move out.

According to the United Nations High Commissioner for Refugees (UNHCR), by the end of 2023, over 117 million people worldwide were forcibly displaced, with 68.3 million remaining internally displaced within their own countries. A significant proportion of these displacements are linked to environmental and climate-related factors. The Internal Displacement Monitoring Centre (IDMC) reported that 7.7 million people were living in internal displacement specifically due to disasters in 2023, highlighting the growing role of climate-related events in driving migration.

Furthermore, the IDMC's 2024 Global Report on Internal Displacement highlights that, as of the end of 2023, 7.7 million people across 82 countries and territories were living in internal displacement specifically due to disasters, including those related to climate change.

While climate-related migration is often framed as a remote issue, extreme weather events are already forcing people out of their homes in many parts of the world. In 2021, storms, floods, landslides, wildfires and droughts triggered 23.7 million internal displacements (i.e. displacement within a country), according to the IDMC. This made up for 60% of all internal displacements that year.

== Statistics by region ==
Many discussions around migration are based on projections. Relatively few use current migration data. Migration related to sudden events like hurricanes, wildfires, heavy rains, floods, and landslides is often short-distance, involuntary, and temporary. Slow-impact events such as droughts and slowly rising temperatures have more mixed effects. But they are more likely to lead to longer-term changes.

Climate-induced migration is a highly complex issue which needs to be understood as part of global migration dynamics. Migration typically has multiple causes, and environmental factors are intertwined with other social and economic factors, which themselves can be influenced by environmental changes. The United Nations High Commissioner for Refugees (UNHCR) recognized that climate change and environmental harm frequently “interact[] with other drivers of displacement” that fit into the established refugee definition.

Additionally, it is maintained that the poor populate areas that are most at risk for environmental destruction and climate change, including coastlines, flood-lines, and steep slopes. As a result, climate change threatens areas already suffering from extreme poverty. "The issue of equity is crucial. Climate affects us all, but does not affect us all equally," UN Secretary-General Ban Ki-moon told delegates at a climate conference in Indonesia.

=== Africa ===
Africa has 80% of the world's refugee population and this number is only set to increase with climate change. Africa is one of the world regions where environmental displacement is critical, largely due to droughts and other climate-related eventualities. The United Nations Environment Programme noted that "No continent will be struck as severely by the impacts of climate change as Africa." Most of the countries in Africa were ranked most vulnerable to climate change and least likely to adapt to its impacts. Existing conflicts, poverty, and displacement in Africa may draw attention away from climate migrants, but it is important to understand that these interrelated challenges often exacerbate the difficulties of those forced to move due to environmental factors.

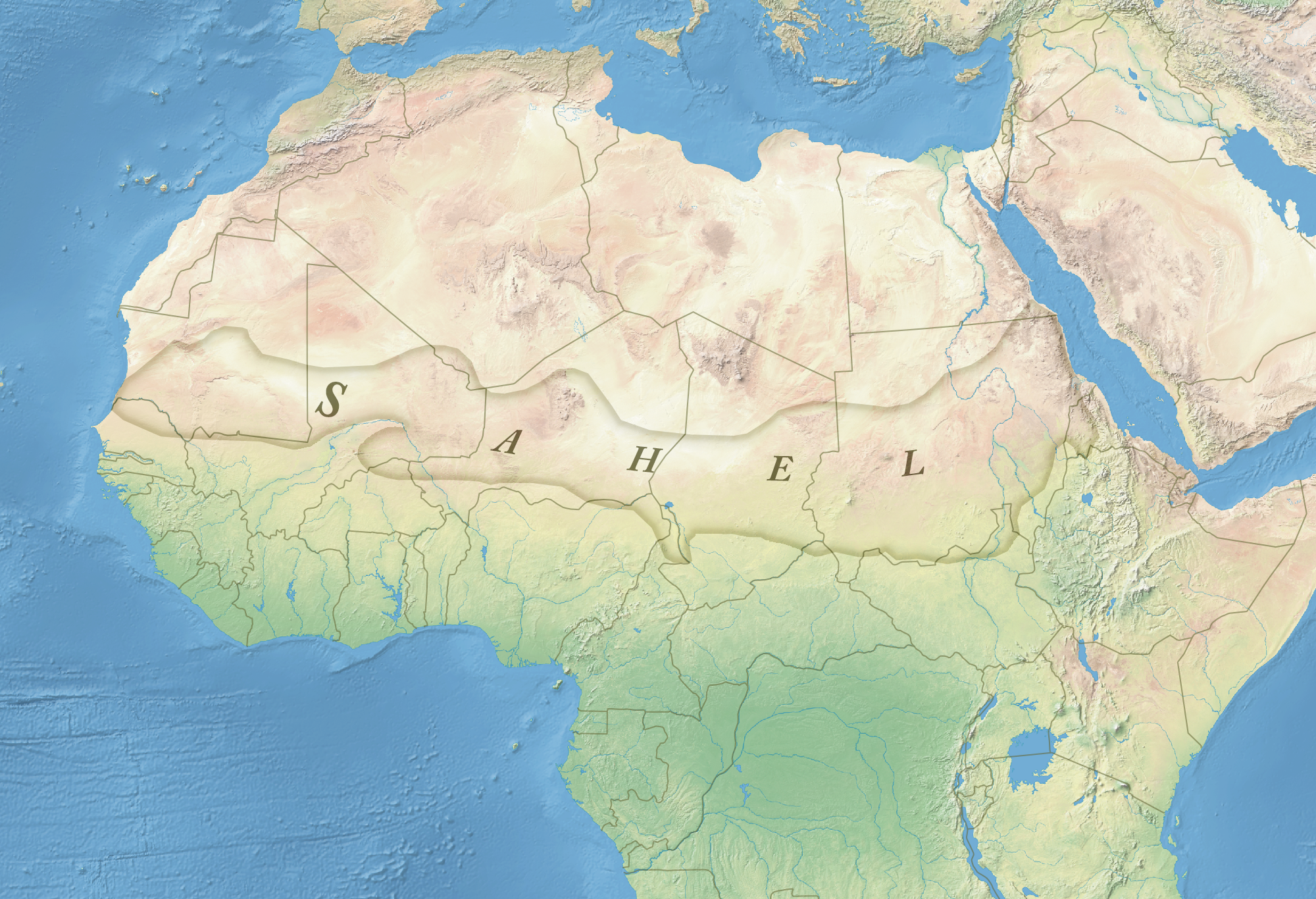
Outline of the Sahel region in Africa. It is threatened by desertification as climate change intensifies.

Drought has become a pressing issue with climate change, and with at least one-third of the population in Africa living in drought prone areas, many of these people are vulnerable. Thus, drought conditions are expected to change the lives of nearly 100 million Africans by 2050. As drought intensifies, it exacerbates desertification, further diminishing the amount of habitable land. Land degradation caused by desertification will have an impact on agricultural productivity, decreasing food security. The connection between desertification and food insecurity is evident in the Sahel region, where between 14.4 and 23.7 million people faced hunger in 2020 and 2021.

Aside from droughts, other parts of Africa experience intensified storms and flooding due to monsoon seasons. In Sudan in 2014 flooding from a storm displaced 159,000 individuals. In Somalia, seasonal rains caused flash flooding in 2023 which displaced nearly a 250,000.

The exacerbation of conflict and displacement in the Lake Chad basin, has been attributed to droughts, floods, and the lake's contraction due to climate change. The dwindling of natural resources is intensifying regional tensions and has led to the displacement of 3 million individuals.

=== Middle East ===
The Middle East is combatting a severe refugee crisis and climate change is set to be influential in creating even more refugees. The leading country in the refugee crisis is Syria, largely due to social conflict. Since 2011, over 14 million Syrians have been displaced. The drought between 2007 and 2010 played a role in exacerbating the Syrian conflict. This period experienced the most severe drought on record, leading to significant agricultural setbacks and prompting numerous farming households to relocate to cities. The drought acted as a catalyst, leading to the Syrian civil war. Such environmental stresses have underscored the idea that many Syrians can be viewed as climate migrants, given that climatic factors indirectly fueled the onset of the Syrian civil war. Back-to-back unprecedented droughts plagued Syrian farmers from 2006 to 2011, resulting in mass migrations from the countryside to the cities where existing infrastructure came under strain. Over one million Syrians have fled the country since the war began, largely resettling in neighboring Turkey. Severe flooding in Pakistan caused massive internal migration in 2022.

Another cause of environmental distress in the Middle East is extreme heat. With its hot desert climate, the Middle east is predicted to reach summertime temperatures as high as 46 °C by 2050. These soaring temperatures have already occurred, although rarely, and have labeled parts of the Middle East as unlivable for humans. Such extreme conditions are expected to increase the number of climate migrants, as people search for cooler and more habitable regions.

=== Asia and the Pacific ===
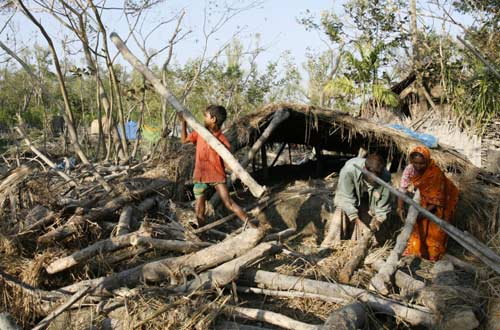
Bangladesh climate refugee

According to the Internal Displacement Monitoring Centre, more than 42 million people were displaced in Asia and the Pacific triggered by sudden onset natural hazards during 2010 and 2011. This figure includes those displaced by storms, floods, and heat and cold waves. Still others were displaced by drought and sea-level rise. Most of those compelled to leave their homes eventually returned when conditions improved, but an undetermined number became migrants, usually within their country, but also across national borders.

A 2012 Asian Development Bank study argues that climate-induced migration should be addressed as part of a country's development agenda, given the major implications of migration on economic and social development. The report recommends interventions both to address the situation of those who have migrated, as well as those who remain in areas subject to environmental risk. It says: "To reduce migration compelled by worsening environmental conditions, and to strengthen the resilience of at-risk communities, governments should adopt policies and commit financing to social protection, livelihoods development, basic urban infrastructure development, and disaster risk management."

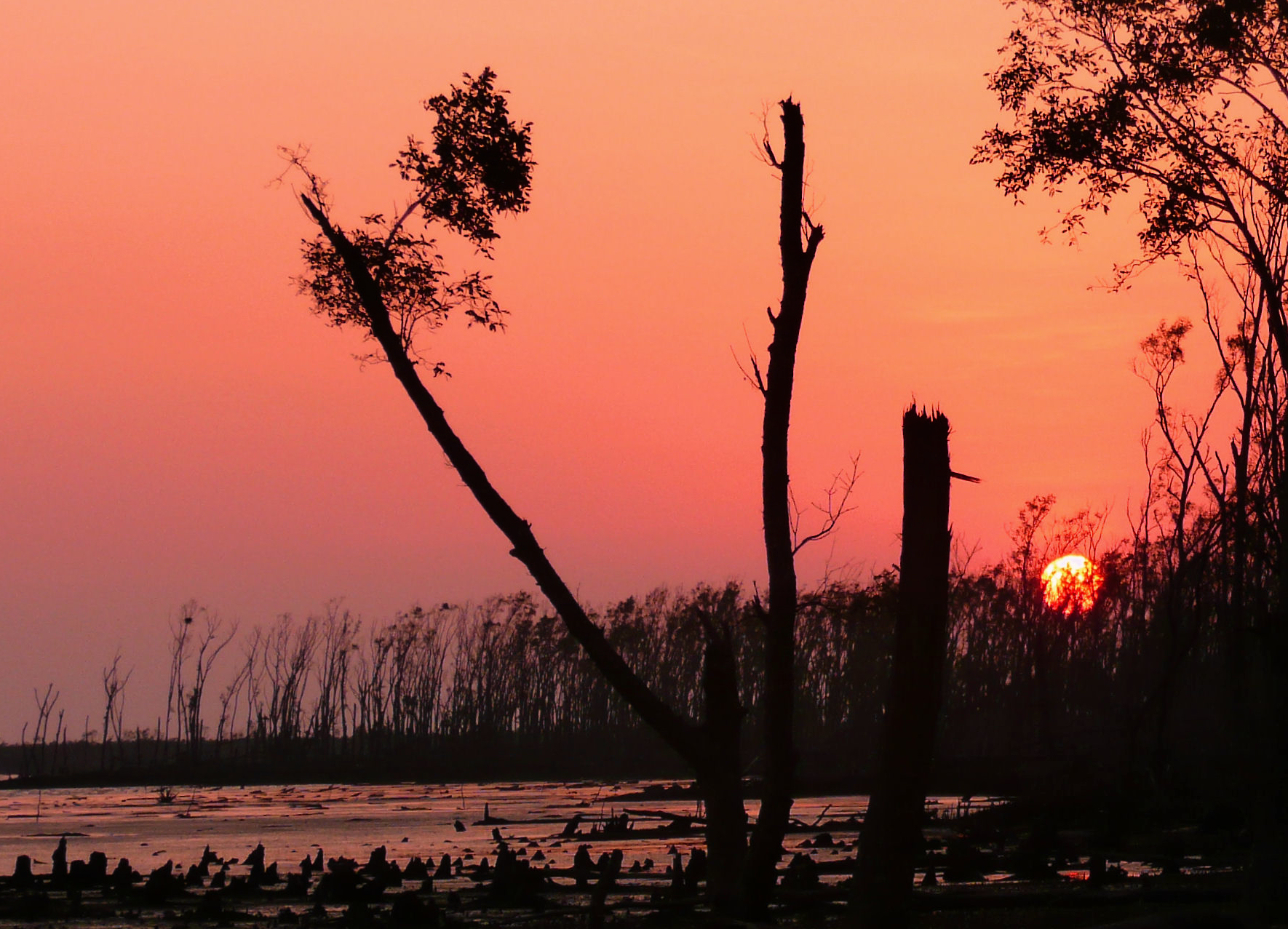
The Sundarbans a few months after Cyclone Sidr in 2007

Due to rising sea levels, as many as 70,000 people will be displaced in the Sundarbans as early as 2020 according to an estimate by the Center for Oceanographic Studies at Jadavpur University. One expert calls for restoring the Sundarbans’ original mangrove habitats to both mitigate the impacts of rising seas and storm surges, and to serve as a carbon sink for greenhouse gas emissions.

650 families of Satbhaya in Kendrapara district of Odisha, India who have been displaced by sea level rise and coastal erosion have been a part of the state government of Odisha's pioneering approach to planned relocation at Bagapatia under Gupti Panchayat. While this approach makes provision for homestead land and other amenities, provisioning for livelihoods like agriculture and fishing which are the mainstay for the relocated populations is needed.

In Minqin County, Gansu Province, "10,000 people have left the area and have become shengtai yimin, 'ecological migrants'". In Xihaigu, Ningxia, water shortages driven by climate change and deforestation have resulted in several waves of government-mandated relocations since 1983.

The Republic of the Marshall Islands is one of four atoll nations in the world that are highly vulnerable to sea level rise. Over a third of the population has moved to the US where, according to recent estimates, approximately 30,000 Marshallese reside, particularly in Hawaii, Arkansas and Washington. While few Marshallese migrants in the US cite climate change as the main reason for moving, many do indicate that it influences their decision whether or not to return some day.

=== North America ===
==== Canada ====
Climate change has increased the likelihood and the intensity of wildfires in Canada. The wildfires have posed immediate dangers to several regions, and the ensuing smoke has affected even more regions. 20% of those exposed to the smoke report a worse health due to the poor air quality. Approximately 13% of the population in Canada are considering to migrate due to increase in wildfires strength and occurrence. In Alberta, it is 16%, and in British Columbia 19%. Women under the age of 35 are the most likely to migrate.

==== California ====
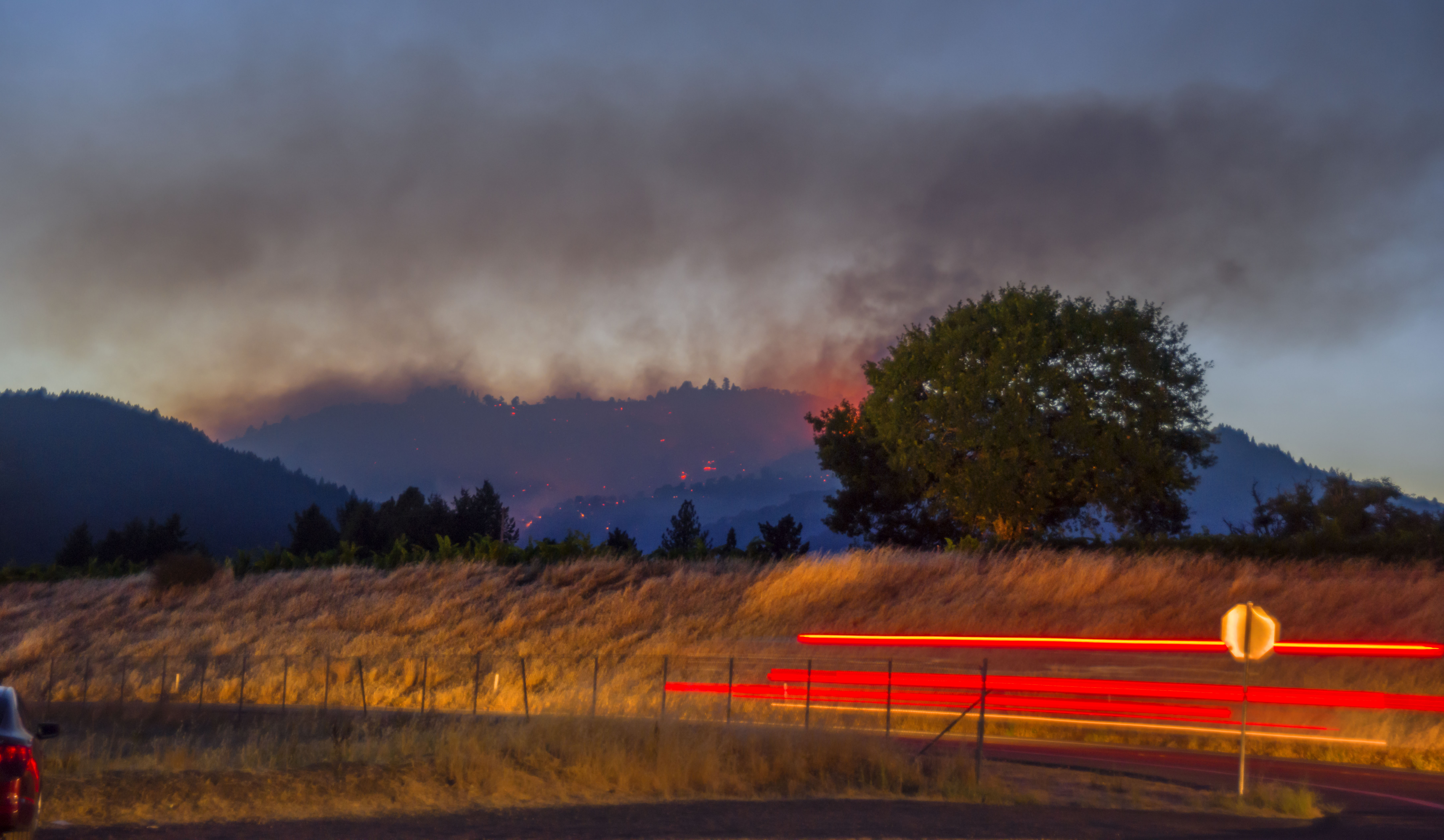
Forest wildfire in Redwood valley, California in July, 2017

California is confronting a growing forest and wildlife crisis due to wildfire. California has historically been vulnerable to wildfires – at least a third of the worst wildfires in US history have occurred in California. However, climate change – specifically, warmer temperatures and more intense drought seasons – in recent years have dramatically increased the size and intensity of wildfires in the state. More than half of the 20 largest California wildfires in modern history occurred between 2018 and 2022. The 2020 wildfires were particularly devastating, burning down more than 4 million acres of land, destroying thousands of buildings, and forcing hundreds of thousands of people to leave their homes.

Evidence suggests that only a small percentage of those affected by the wildfires choose to stay. Only several thousands of the 27,000 residents affected by the 2018 Sierra Nevada fire chose to remain and rebuild. The others chose to migrate either to other parts of California or out-of-state. They face special difficulties with relocation due to lack of fire insurance policies and the state's lack of affordable housing. The state estimates at least 2.5 million homes are needed in the next eight years to catch up to demand.

==== Alaska ====
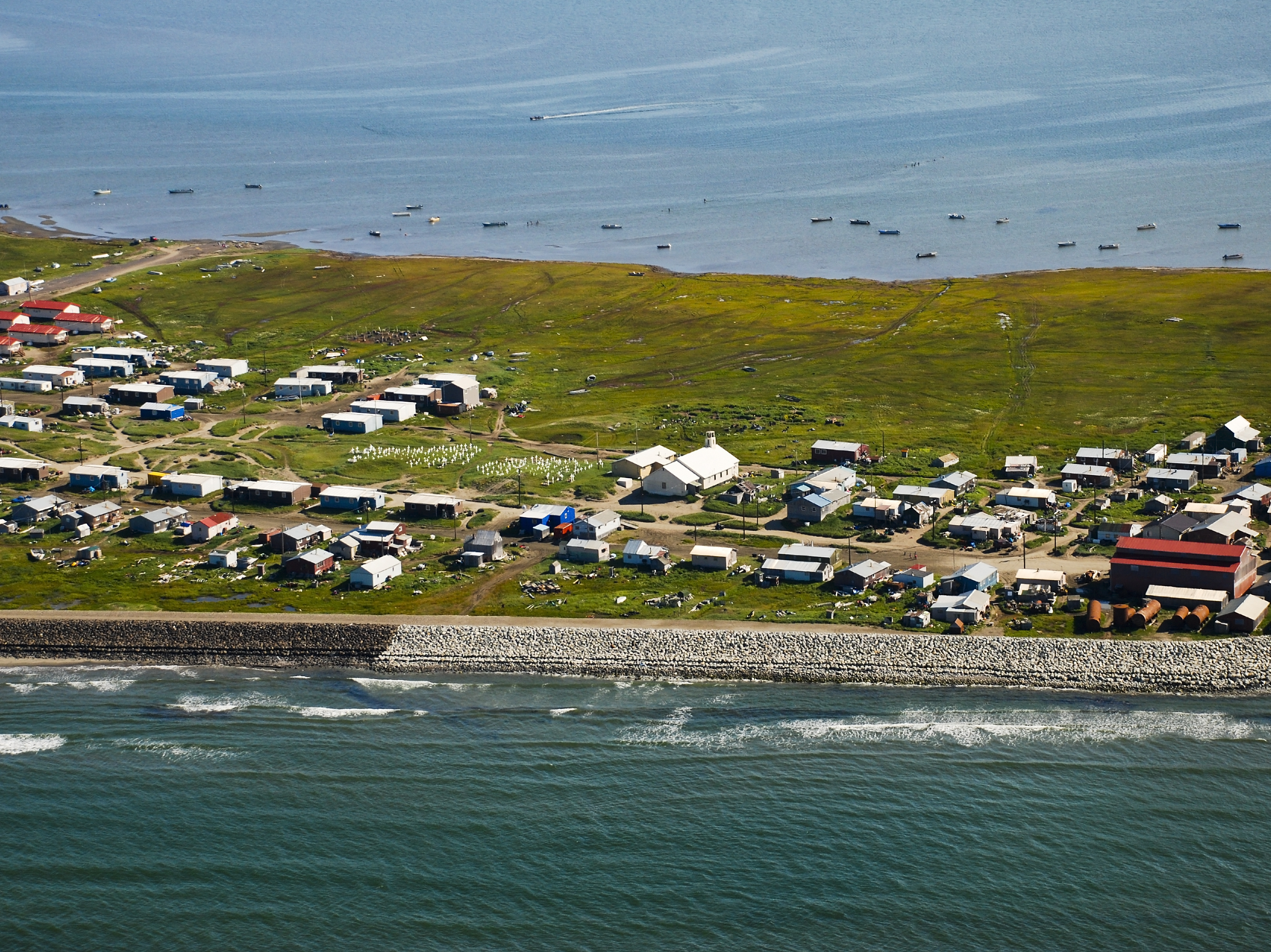
Shishmaref, Alaska, along with other Alaska villages, has faced increased flood risk since 2003.

There have been 178 Alaskan communities threatened by erosion of their land. The annual temperature has steadily increased over the last fifty years, with Alaska seeing it double (compared to the rate seen across the rest of the United States) to the rate of 3.4 degrees, with an alarming 6.3 degrees increase for the winters over the past fifty years. Many of the communities residing in these areas have been living off the land for generations. There is an eminent threat of loss of culture and loss of tribal identity with these communities.

Between 2003 and 2009, a partial survey by the Army Corps of Engineers identified thirty-one Alaskan villages under imminent threat of flooding and erosion. By 2009, 12 of the 31 villages had decided to relocate, with four (Kivalina, Newtok, Shaktoolik, and Shishmaref) requiring immediate evacuation due to danger of immediate flooding along with limited evacuation options.

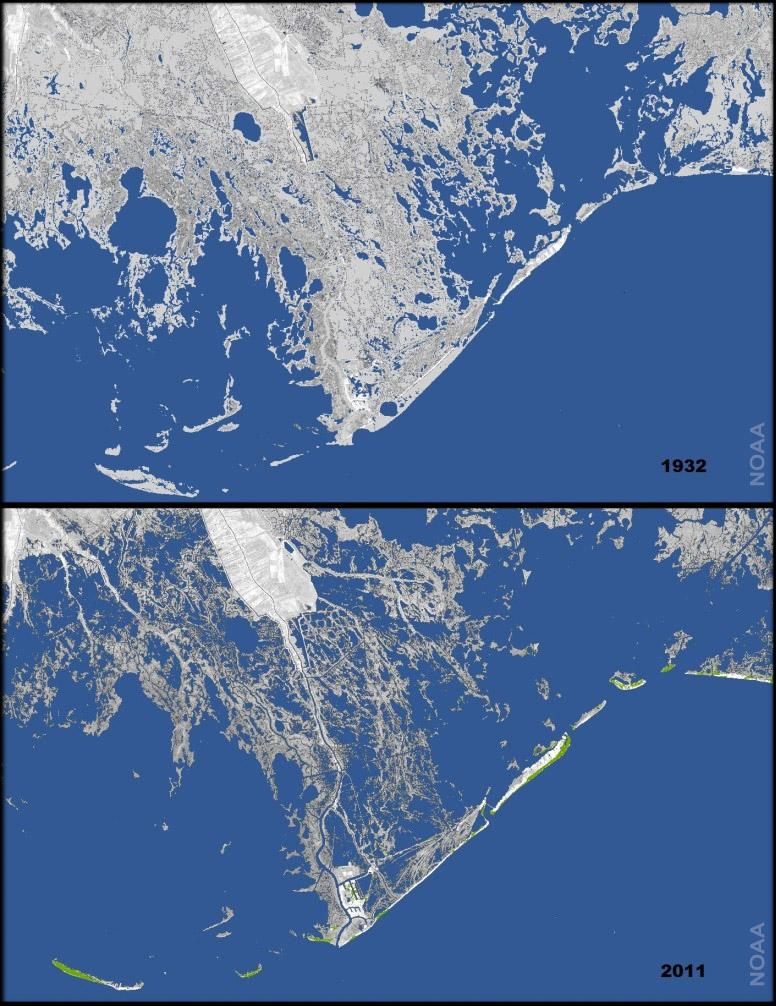
Spatial image of land lost in Louisiana from 1932 (on top) until 2013 (on bottom)

==== Louisiana ====
Isle de Jean Charles, Louisiana, home to the Biloxi-Chitimacha-Choctaw First Nation, is being depopulated with federal grant money, due to saltwater intrusion and sea level rise. This Indigenous Nation residing on the Isle de Jean Charles is facing the effects of climate change. The resettlement of this community of around 100, exists as the first migration of a total community in the state of Louisiana. This state has lost almost 2,000 square miles (5,200 km^{2}) of its coast within the last 87 years and now an alarming rate of almost 16 square miles (41 km^{2}) per year is disappearing. In early 2016, a 48-million-dollar grant was the first allocation of federal tax dollars to aid a community suffering from direct impact of climate change. Louisiana has lost land mass comparable to the size of the state of Delaware revealing land mass loss that is at a rate faster than many places in the world. The resettlement plan for the Isle de Jean Charles is at the forefront of responding to climate change without destroying the community that resides within.

==== Washington state ====
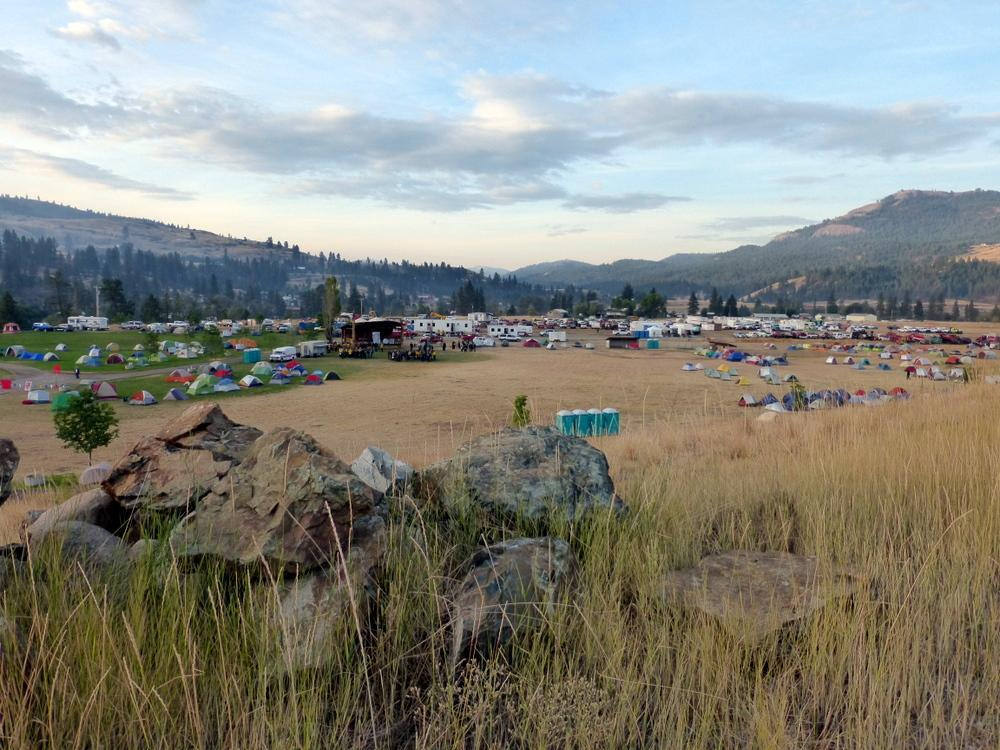
Wildfire evacuation tents, Kettle Complex Fire, 2015.

Native American tribes located on the outer coast of the state of Washington's Olympic Peninsula, such as the Quinault Indian Nation village of Taholah, and the Shoalwater Bay Tribe, have been increasingly vulnerable to encroaching sea levels, storm surges and intense rain causing landslides and floods. In response, the Quinault Indian Nation conducted a vulnerability assessment and devised a comprehensive relocation plan to move two of its villages – Taholah and Queets, home to 660 tribal members – to higher ground way above the tsunami and flood zones. However, relocation is expensive and only possible with federal funding – it is estimated that moving the 471-member Shoalwater Bay Tribe up the mountain could cost half a billion dollars. The Department of the Interior, under the Biden Administration, has created programs designed to help relocate communities affected by climate change and is assessing which tribes to allocate funding to first.

=== Central America and the Caribbean ===
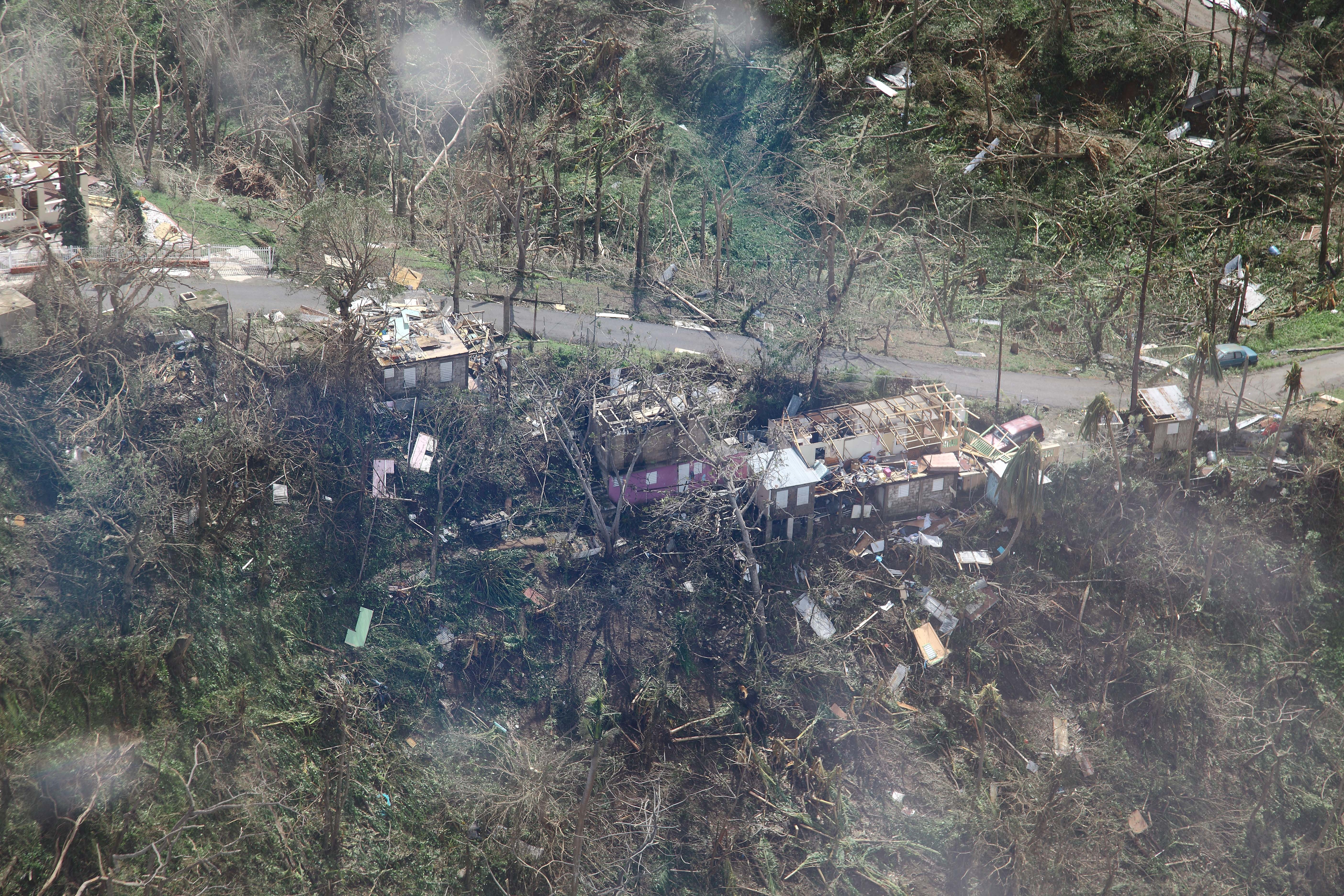
Buildings in Puerto Rico that were destroyed by Hurricane Maria in 2017.

The people of Central America and the Caribbean are repeatedly faced with severe weather events and climate change will only exacerbate this issue. A large portion of this region lies along the “Dry Corridor”, an arid region that includes areas of Panama, Honduras, Nicaragua, El Salvador and the Dominican Republic. The dry corridor is predicted to expand with the onset of climate change. It is currently home to approximately 10 million people, half of whom are subsistence farmers, who rely heavily on stable weather patterns for their livelihoods, making them particularly susceptible to becoming climate migrants in search of more arable land and better living conditions. A 2023 study on the Central American Dry Corridor found that increasing droughts and declining agricultural yields have intensified climate-related migration, with many rural households using temporary or permanent migration as a strategy to cope with climate-induced livelihood loss. Also, from 2009 - 2019, two million residents in the dry corridor have experienced hunger because of extreme weather events caused by climate change. Natural weather patterns such as the El Niño Southern Oscillation, or simply “El Niño”, can make dry conditions in this region more extreme. Wet periods following an El Niño weather event can bring torrential rain that results in major flooding and catastrophic landslides. Multiple studies have shown that climate change could result in more frequent extreme El Niños.

Food security issues are expected to worsen across Central America due to climate change. In August 2019, Honduras declared a state of emergency when a drought caused the southern part of the country to lose 72% of its corn and 75% of its bean production. It is predicted that by 2070, corn yields in Central America may fall by 10%, beans by 29%, and rice by 14%. With Central American crop consumption dominated by corn (70%), beans (25%), and rice (6%), the expected drop in staple crop yields could have devastating consequences. The World Bank predicts that by 2050, climate change-induced migration could displace 1.4 - 2.1 million residents of Central America and Mexico. The highest estimate is that worsening droughts and flooding from climate change could displace up to 4 million people in the region by 2050.

Several weather events in the 21st century have displayed the devastating effects of the El Niño weather pattern and have led to mass displacement and hunger crises. In 2015, due to the strongest El Niño in recorded history, hundreds of thousands of Central American subsistence farmers lost a portion or the entirety of their crops. Throughout 2014 and 2015, El Salvador alone saw over $100 million in damage to crops. In Guatemala, the drought caused a food shortage that left 3 million people struggling to feed themselves, according to a 2015 report authored by the International Organization for Migration (IOM) and the United Nations’ World Food Programme (WFP). The Guatemalan government declared a state of emergency as the drought and high food prices led to a hunger crisis during which chronic malnutrition was common among children. By the end of June 2016, it was estimated by the United Nations’ Office for the Coordination of Humanitarian Affairs (OCHA) that 3.5 million people required humanitarian assistance across El Salvador, Guatemala and Honduras.In 2018, 50% of the 94,000 Guatemalans deported from the United States and Mexico were from these western highlands, an area particularly susceptible to climate change.

The IOM and WFP report also showed the ways in which food insecurity led to migration from El Salvador, Guatemala, and Honduras. Pointing out that there are millions of Central Americans living abroad (with over 80% in the United States), the report stated there is a positive correlation between food insecurity and migration from these countries. It also confirmed that crises related to hunger and violence are exacerbated when the region heads into the second consecutive year of an extreme drought.

=== South America ===
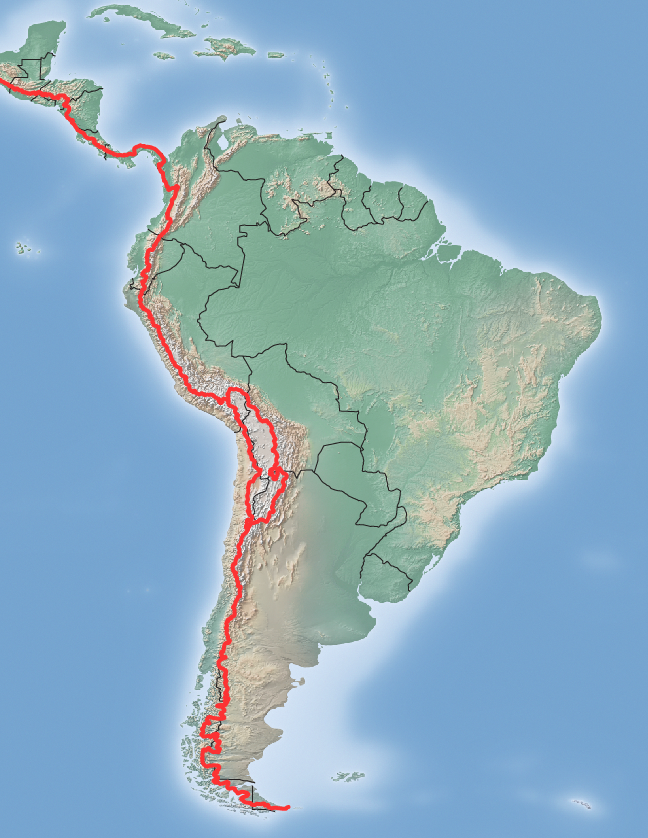
South America Continental Divide

Research on South American migration patterns have found multiple connections between climate change and its effect on migration.The effects and results vary based on the type of climatic change, socioeconomic status and demographic characteristics of migrants and the distance and direction of the migration. Since most climate migration studies are done in the developed world, scientists have called for more quantitative research within the developing world, including South America. Migration in South America does not always increase as a result of increased environmental threats but is affected by factors such as climate variability and land suitability. These migrations are typically directed from rural to urban areas. Inter-provincial migration is shown to not be as heavily influenced by environmental changes whereas migration outside of the country of origin is heavily influenced by environmental changes. The results of a climactic event catalyzing migration change depending on the onset of the event, however, climate change related events such as drought and hurricanes augment or increase youth migration. Youth are more likely to migrate as a response to climate-related events. As a result, children who have been displaced are found to travel shorter distances to find work in rural destinations versus further to an urban area. The increase in interest in this topic in the past decade has called for a measure called preventive resettlement. The cases in which preventive resettlement appear appropriate is typically discerned by local and governmental bodies.

Active sea-level rise resulted in the relocation of the people of Enseada da Baleia, a coastal community located on Cardoso Island in southeastern Brazil. The government offered the residents the ability to either relocate to another community on the island or a city on the mainland. Most residents chose to move to a new location that was more inland on the same island and paid for their own expenses of relocation with little government assistance. Brazilian lawyer Erika Pires Ramos argues that the dilemma faced by the residents of Enseada da Baleia illustrates how climate migrants are invisible throughout much of Latin America. Governments must first recognize and identify groups of climate migrants in order to better help them.

The International Organization for Migration estimates that today nearly 11 million South Americans are currently resettling or migrating due to recent and ongoing natural disasters, some of which are climate-induced. Collecting and maintaining data on climate migrants remains a major obstacle for South American governments in preparing and anticipating for migration flows from future climate-induced disasters. Peru passed a national climate change law in 2018 that mandates the government, led by a multi-agency group, to create a plan to mitigate and adapt to future climate migrations. Uruguay already has its own “national resettlement plan” for climate-induced migrations in place.

A few countries like Argentina and Brazil, offer a “disaster-related emergency visa”. In Argentina, the visa came into effect in 2022 includes relocation, housing and integration support provided by civil society.

Some Guna people, such as those in the settlement of Gardi Sugdub, have decided to relocate from islands to the mainland of Panama due to sea level rise.

=== Europe ===
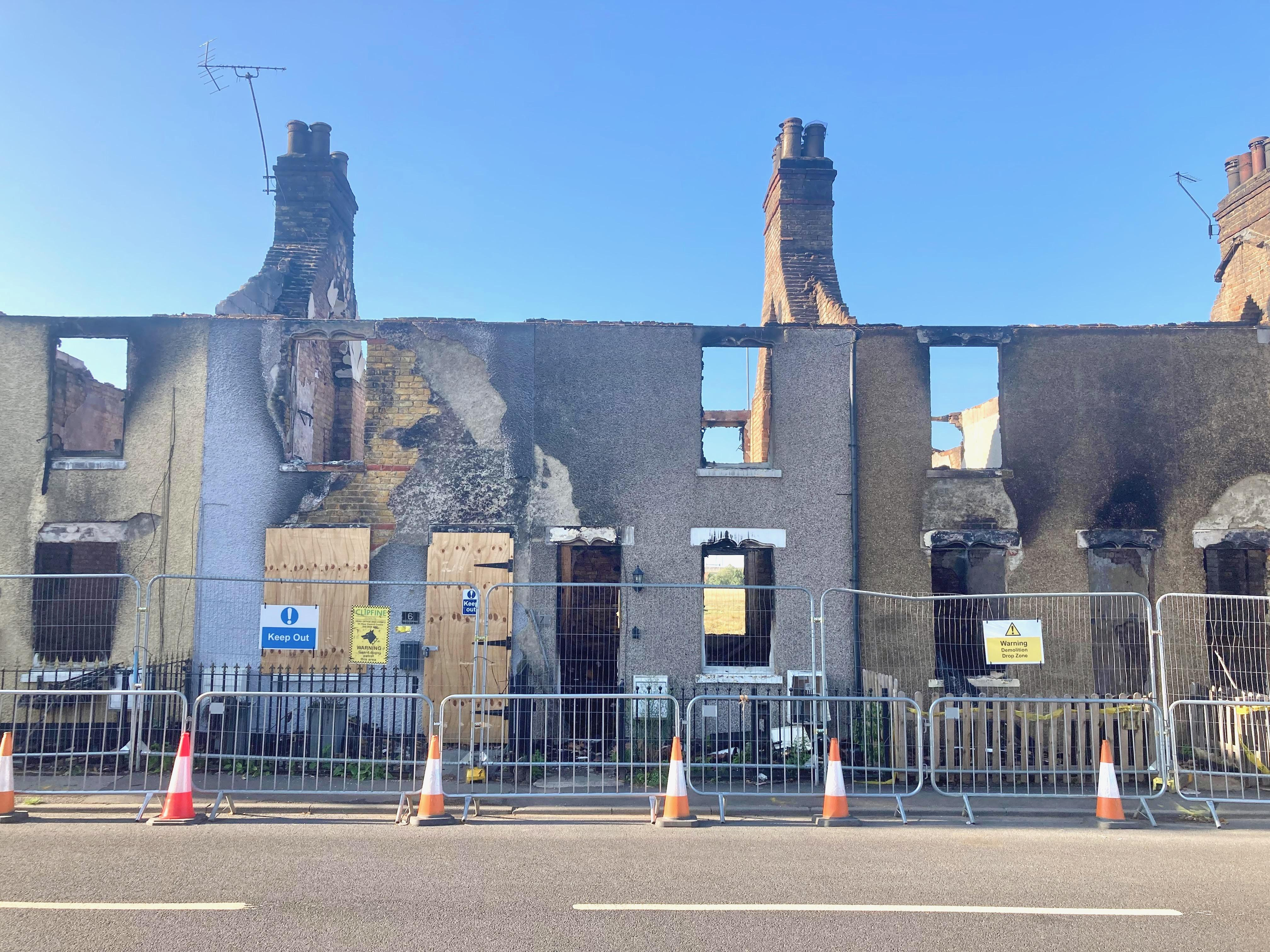
Houses destroyed in the Wennington wildfire, London 2022

Estimates put the number of displaced persons in Europe from climate-related events at over 700,000 in the last ten years. Most of the continent's climate-related catastrophes are a result of either flooding or wildfires.The European Union has yet to adopt any continent-wide convention on the status of migrants displaced by climate-related events.

Due to the 2014 Balkan flooding (which is considered to be linked to climate change), some people in Bosnia and Herzegovina migrated to other European countries.

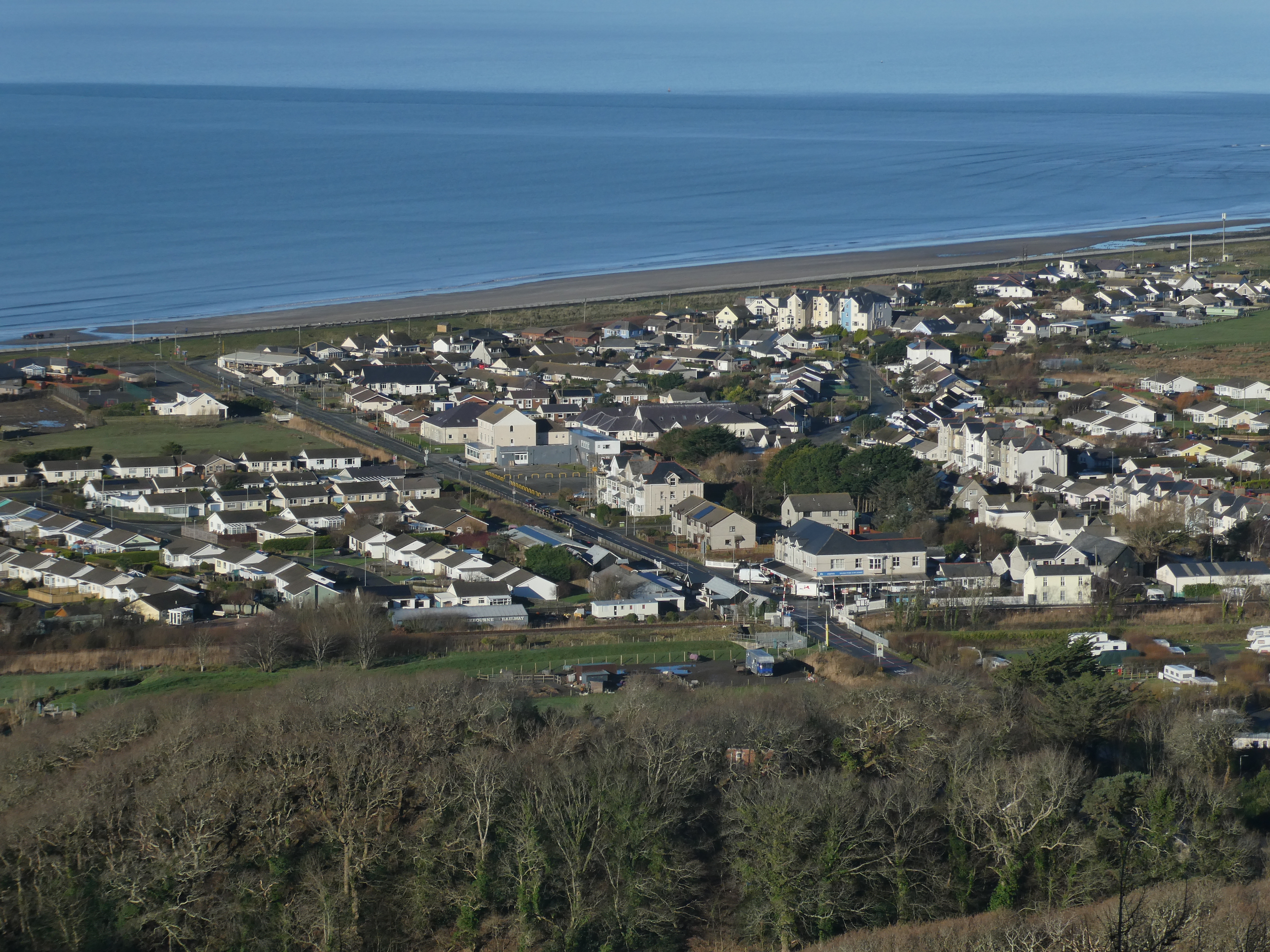
Fairbourne, Wales, an area particularly vulnerable to sea level rise

Moldova, with a large rural population dependent on subsistence farming, is one of Europe's most vulnerable countries to the threat of climate change. Increasing erratic weather patterns may lead to crop failures and mass migrations to neighboring countries. In 2010, devastating floods completely submerged the village of Cotul Morii in central Moldova resulting in the evacuation of 440 families. Government authorities mandated that Cotul Morii be reconstructed in a new location 15 kilometers away from the original village which the government officially abandoned. Despite this, over 60 families chose to remain and rebuild their community in the original village even with a lack of running water or electricity. Climate migration researchers emphasize the growing importance of a “right to voluntary immobility”. There are often very sensitive and complicated issues at play when making the decision to relocate an entire population from their home, and many residents may choose to voluntarily opt-out of government efforts.

In Wales, the village of Fairbourne has been cited as an area particularly vulnerable to sea level rise. The local Gwynedd Council has described it as impractical to protect from rising sea levels and proposed managed retreat.

== Political and legal perspectives ==
The International Organization for Migration (IOM) expects the scale of global migration to rise as a result of accelerated climate change. It, therefore, recommends policymakers around the world to take a proactive stance on the matter. Despite the scale of climate migration, current legal protections across the world are ineffective in protecting climate migrants. Few existing international frameworks and regional and domestic legal regimes provide adequate protection to climate migrants. Typically, climate migrants are not legally recognized as refugees and therefore do not enjoy international and domestic refugee law protections. In the Americas, instead of being granted refugee status, individuals displaced by environmental factors are offered humanitarian visas or complementary protection, which do not always provide permanent residence and citizenship pathways. Although the term 'refugee' is legally incorrect, the definition of climate change refugee has been created to address the crisis. Every individuals affected by environmental harm still deserves protection and aid on humanitarian grounds.

A report from the International Refugee Assistance Project (IRAP) therefore recommends the creation of new legal pathways to safety for people moving in the context of climate change and environmental degradation. IRAP's report also recommends that governments develop stronger humanitarian protection for people who are forcibly displaced in a changing climate. The report emphasizes that strengthening the legal protections for climate-displaced persons should be preemptive with increased options for these persons before environmental disasters occur.

The International Law Commission (ILC) provides guidance on the legal protections that climate-displaced persons should enjoy when disasters strikes. ILC's Draft Articles on the Protection of Persons in the Event of Disasters advocates for mass displacement to be included in the definition of “disaster”. The United Nations Human Rights Committee (UNHRC) recently decided cases wherein the Committee asserted that “the ICCPR obligates states not to return people fleeing life-threatening climate change impacts.” In one of these cases, Teitota v. New Zealand, the UNHRC held that “individuals and groups who have crossed national borders could file subsequent petitions against deportation to the UNHRC, after exhausting domestic options, based on climate change impacts that violate the right to life.” In January 2020, the UN Human Rights Committee ruled that "climate refugees fleeing the effects of the climate crisis cannot be forced by their adoptive countries to return to their home counties whose climate is posing an immediate threat."

The Environmental Justice Foundation (EJF) argued that people who will be forced to move due to climate change currently have no adequate recognition in international law. The EJF contends that a new multilateral legal instrument is required to specifically address the needs of "climate refugees" in order to confer protection to those fleeing environmental degradation and climate change. They have also asserted that additional funding is needed to enable developing countries to adapt to climate change. Sujatha Byravan and Sudhir Chella Rajan have argued for the use of the term 'climate exiles' and for international agreements to provide them political and legal rights, including citizenship in other countries, bearing in mind those countries' responsibilities and capabilities.

=== Global perceptions from possible countries of asylum ===
Acceptance of the possibility of environmental migrants may be influenced by other challenges that confront a nation. In Canada, there is public interest in policies that foster planning and accommodations. On 20 September 2016, Prime Minister Trudeau of Canada told the UN Summit for Refugees and Migrants that plans just for resettlement would not be enough. Sweden which had allowed refugees to seek asylum from areas of war in an open door policy has changed to a policy that is more deterrent of asylum seekers and is even offering money for asylum seekers to withdraw their requests. The United States, which was warned under the Obama administration to prepare for climate change and consequent refugees, had more difficulties in doing so under former President Donald Trump, who denied the reality of climate change, signed executive orders dismantling environmental protections, ordered the EPA to remove climate change information from their public site, and signaled his administration's unwillingness to anticipate environmental refugees from climate change.

A nation grants "asylum" when it grants someone freedom from prosecution within its borders. Each country makes its own rules and laws of asylum. The United States, for example, has a system recognized by federal and international laws. France was the first country to constitute the right to asylum. The right to asylum differs in different nations. There is a still fight for the right to asylum in some areas of the world.

In 2021, a French court ruled in an extradition hearing to avoid the deportation of a Bangladeshi man with asthma from France after his lawyer argued that he risked a severe deterioration in his condition, due to the air pollution in his homeland. Heavy floods affected Rohingya refugee camps in Bangladesh in July 2021.

The Biden administration in the United States released several intelligence agency reports in 2021 that sketched out in sweeping language the risks climate change poses to global stability. The reports emphasize the destabilizing effects climate change will take on developing countries including massive rises in food insecurity, worsening droughts, fires and flooding, and sea level rises. Some of the most vulnerable countries, the report concludes, are Guatemala, Haiti, Pakistan, Afghanistan, and Iraq; countries with weak state institutions that are located in especially climate-vulnerable regions of the world. In February 2021, President Biden signed an executive order “directing the National Security Council to provide options for protecting and resettling people displaced by climate change”.

In an updated report on climate migration released in October 2021, the Biden Administration detailed how the United States government should work to aid and assist climate migrants around the world. The report points to the use of U.S. foreign assistance through active humanitarian support, technical expertise, and capacity building and calls for increased funding to achieve these goals. Emphasizing the “complex interplay between climate change and migration”, the report orients the government's focus to focus on climate migration as a single issue, demanding greater attention and focus in the coming years.

== Planning for climate migrants ==
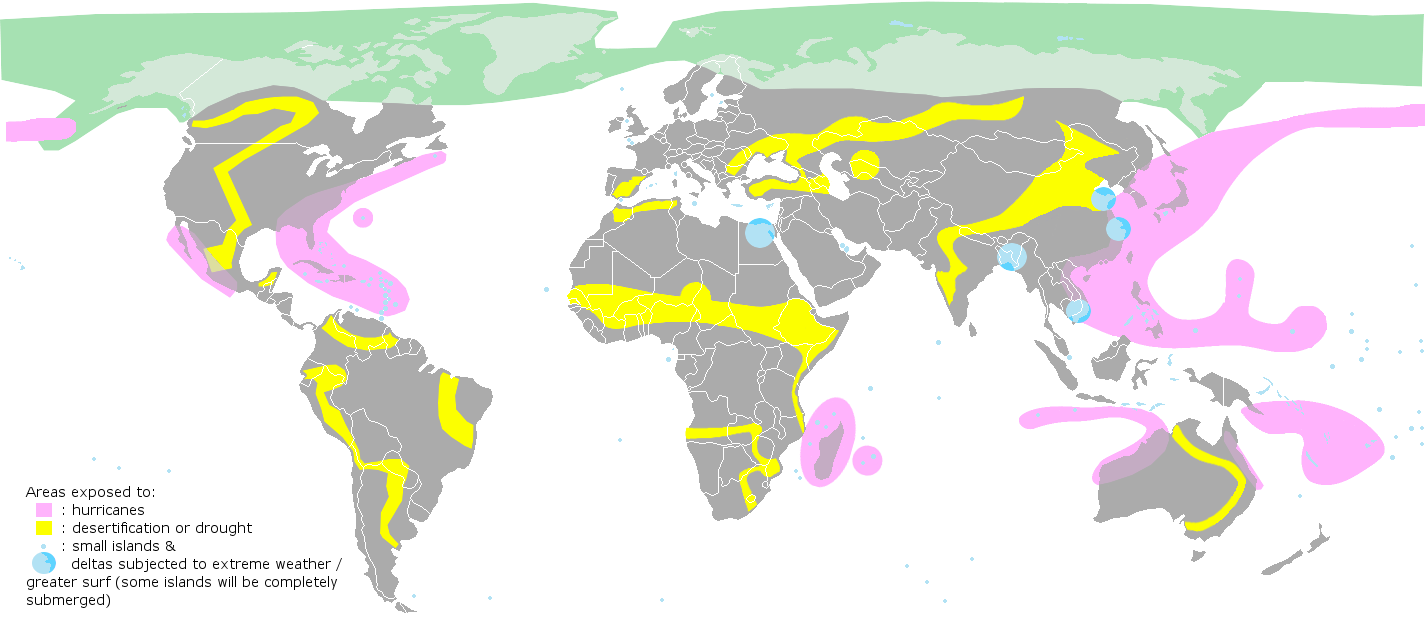
A schematic showing the regions where more natural disasters will occur due to climate change.

Planning for climate migration entails preparing for the desertion of geographically vulnerable areas as well as for the influx of vulnerable communities into largely urban areas. In addressing current issues of environmental migration and preparing for forthcoming ones, experts call for interdisciplinary, locally-informed, equitable, and accessible approaches. Cities can explore what being “migrant friendly” might look like, such as offering job training programs, affordable and livable housing, access to green spaces, accessible mass transit systems, and resources to overcome language or cultural barriers. Special investment in both resources and information dissemination can help accommodate the diverse needs of people with disabilities and mental health conditions – both in the immediate moment of a disaster, where some emergency response and early warning systems may not be audiologically or visually accessible, and in the aftermath. Investments in flood barriers and other infrastructure for adaptation can provide physical protections against severe weather. Incorporating these considerations into planning conversations now can assist cities in preparing for the worst effects of climate change before some of the scenarios for climate migration come to occur.

Sustainable development, emergency response mechanisms, and local planning can help mitigate the consequences of climate migration. Mitigation may be too late for many, leaving planned migration as the only option. For people whose livelihoods are closely linked to the stability and health of their environment – like farmers and fishers – migration may become necessary for survival. A recent New York Times and Pulitzer Center article on the issue notes that “by comparison, Americans are richer, often much richer, and more insulated from the shocks of climate change. They are distanced from the food and water sources they depend on, and they are part of a culture that sees every problem as capable of being solved by money...Census data show us how Americans move: toward heat, toward coastlines, toward drought, regardless of evidence of increasing storms and flooding and other disasters...The sense that money and technology can overcome nature has emboldened Americans." This disparity is reflected in the coastal real estate market and development projects. Addressing climate migration issues and climate change as a whole may involve reimagining how, where, and why municipalities develop and urbanize for the future.

In an article written for The Guardian, Gaia Vince outlined what the future of climate migration would look like and how countries can prepare. She cites research from the United Nations estimating that in the next 30 years, over 1 billion climate and environmental migrants will be uprooted from their homes, largely from countries in the Global South. Developed nations in North America and Europe, with aging and declining populations, will benefit from accepting and assimilating these climate migrants into their societies, she argues. Climate migration can be a solution to many of the world's problems, rather than just a problem, according to Vince. Currently, there is no global body or organization devoted exclusively to the issue of climate migration, however, Vince argues that new climate-friendly policies are still possible. Vince points to the rapid European response to enact open-border policies and right-to-work laws for Ukrainian refugees fleeing the 2022 war as an example. The policies arguably saved millions of lives and enabled the migrants to avoid the convoluted and slow-acting bureaucratic hurdles that exist for migrants from other countries. Vince argues that the Ukrainian migrant policy provides a blueprint for how developed countries can adopt policies and contingency plans for climate migrants in the future.

In the UK, research is being done on how climate change's impact on countries that are emigrated to will vary due to the infrastructure of those countries. They want to put into place policies so that those who have to migrate could go throughout Europe, and have solid emergency planning in place so that the people being displaced would have a swift and quick plan of escape once their environment can no longer handle inhabitants-slow or sudden onset. The end goal of this work is to determine the best course of action in the event of various environmental catastrophes.

== Society and culture ==
A documentary entitled Climate Refugees was released in 2010. Climate Refugees was an Official Selection for the 2010 Sundance Film Festival. More recently, Short Documentary Academy Award Nominee, Sun Come Up (2011), tells the story of Carteret islanders in Papua New Guinea who are forced to leave their ancestral land in response to climate change and migrate to war-torn Bougainville. Since 2007, German artist Hermann Josef Hack has shown his World Climate Refugee Camp in the centers of various European cities. The model camp, made of roughly 1000 miniature tents, is a public art intervention that depicts the social impacts of climate change.

Various works of ecofiction and climate fiction have also featured migration. One of these is The Water Knife by Paolo Bacigalupi, which focuses on climate displacement and migration within the American Southwest.

== See also ==
- Climate migration and water rights
- Climate refuge
- Economic analysis of climate change
- Effects of climate change on human health
- Extreme event attribution
- Great Filter
- International Organization for Migration
- Internally displaced person
- Managed retreat
- Politics of climate change
- Sea level rise
- Space and survival
- List of areas depopulated due to climate change
- List of countries by greenhouse gas emissions
- List of sovereign states by immigrant and emigrant population
