= Water right =

Right of a user to use water from a water source

In water law, water right is the right of a user to use water from a water source, e.g., a river, stream, pond or source of groundwater. In areas with plentiful water and few users, such systems are generally not complicated or contentious. In other areas, especially arid areas where irrigation is practiced, such systems are often the source of conflict, both legal and physical. Some systems treat surface water and ground water in the same manner, while others use different principles for each.

== Types ==
Rules regarding ownership of underground water by country

Water rights requires consideration of the context and origin of the right being discussed, or asserted. Traditionally, water rights refers to the utilization of water as an element supporting basic human needs like drinking or irrigation. Water rights could also include the physical occupancy of waterways for purposes of travel, commerce and recreational pursuits. The legal principles and doctrines that form the basis of each type of water rights are not interchangeable and vary according to local and national laws. Therefore, variations among countries and within national subdivisions exist in discussing and acknowledging these rights.

=== Utilization of water as an element ===
==== Based on ownership of the land ====
Often, water rights are based on ownership of the land upon which the water rests or flows. For example, under English common law, any rights asserted to "moveable and wandering" water must be based upon rights to the "permanent and immovable" land below.

On streams and rivers, these are referred to as riparian rights or littoral rights, which are protected by property law. Legal principles long recognized under riparian principles involve the right to remove the water – for drinking or irrigation – or to add more water into the channel – for drainage or effluence. Under riparian law, water rights are subject to the test of "reasonable use". The judiciary has defined "reasonable use" principle as follows: "the true test of the principle and extent of the use is whether it is to the injury of the other proprietors or not." Because of the limits on use, the doctrine of riparian rights is often known as the "downstream user rule" – the downstream users have rights to the water which the upstream users may not abridge.

==== Based on previous use or prior appropriation ====
Where water is more scarce (like in the Western United States), allocation of flowing water is premised upon prior appropriation. "The appropriation doctrine confers upon one who actually diverts and uses water the right to continue to do so provided that the water is used for reasonable and beneficial uses", regardless of whether that person owns land contiguous to the watercourse. "[A]s between appropriators, the rule of priority is 'first in time, first in right.'" The 20th century system of prior appropriation water rights is characterized by five principles:

1. Exclusive right is given to the original appropriator, and all following privileges are conditional upon precedent rights.
2. All privileges are conditional upon beneficial use.
3. Water may be used on riparian lands or non-riparian lands (i.e., water may be used on the land next to the water source, or on land removed from the water source)
4. Diversion is permitted, regardless of the shrinkage of the river or stream.
5. The privilege may be lost through non-use.

Beneficial use is defined as agricultural, industrial, or urban use. Environmental uses, such as maintaining a body of water and the wildlife that use it, were not initially regarded as beneficial uses in some states but have been accepted in some areas. Every water right is parameterized by an annual yield and an appropriation date. When a water right is sold, it maintains its original appropriation date.

==== Community-based allocation of water ====
In some jurisdictions, appropriative water rights can be granted directly to communities. Here, water is reserved to provide sufficient capacity for the future growth of that particular community. For example, California provides communities and other water users within watersheds senior status over appropriative (use-based) water rights solely because they are located where the water originates and naturally flows.

A second example of community-based water rights is pueblo water rights. As recognized by California, pueblo water rights are grants to individual settlements (i.e. pueblos) over all streams and rivers flowing through the city and to all groundwater aquifers underlying that particular city. The pueblo's claim expands with the needs of the city and may be used to supply the needs of areas that are later annexed to the city. While California recognizes pueblo water rights, pueblo water rights are controversial. Some scholars and courts have argued that the pueblo water rights doctrine lacks a historical basis in Spanish or Mexican water law.

==== Right to clean water ====
Due to humanity's dependence upon clean water, many nations, states and municipalities have enacted regulations to preemptively protect water quality and quantity. This right of a government to regulate water quality is premised upon protecting downstream navigable waters from contamination. These waters are publicly owned and include the right to receive these waters undiminished under both the riparian and appropriation doctrines under the Clean Water Act.

=== The right to access and physically occupy water ===
The Commerce Clause of the U.S. Constitution gives Congress the power to regulate and occupy "navigable waters"; this is referred to as a navigable servitude. Congress has exercised this power in a variety of ways, including the construction of dams, diverting water from a stream and blocking and restricting use of waterways. The servitude is a Federal power, not an individual right.

Public trust rights to access and recreate upon navigable-in-fact waters may also exist. These rights are often based on local laws over property held in trust for the public. In the United States, each state holds the land submerged by navigable waters in trust for the public and can establish a public right to access or recreate within these public waterways. Again, this "water right" is not an individual right, but rather a public right and individual privilege which may include restrictions and limitations based on local laws.

The Fifth and Eleventh Amendment to the U.S. Constitution limit the power of state or federal governments to impinge upon any exclusive use of water by prohibiting the enactment of any laws or regulations that amount to a "taking" of private property. Laws and regulations that deprive a riparian owner of legally cognizable water rights constitute an illegal governmental taking of private property for which just compensation is owed to the water right holder.

== History ==
In ancient Rome, the law was that people could obtain temporary usufructuary rights for running water. These rights were independent of land ownership, and lasted as long as use continued.

Under English common law, all tidal waters were held by the Crown and all freshwater streams were included with title to the lands, with full accompanying rights. However, under the riparian doctrine, landowners had the right to receive water undiminished by upstream landowners.

Over time, rights evolved from being strictly land-based to also include use-based, allowing non-landowners to hold enforceable rights to receive clean water. A reasonable use rule evolved in some countries.

== Finland ==
In Finland, waterbodies are generally privately owned, but Finland also applies the Roman law principle of aqua profluens (flowing water), according to which the freely flowing water in waterbodies cannot be owned or possessed. This means that the owners of waterbodies cannot prohibit diversion of water for agricultural, industrial, municipal, or domestic use according to the provisions of the Finnish Water Law. A separate act regulates provision of water. There also exists public easement over rivers.

== See also ==
- California State Water Resources Control Board
- Climate migration and water rights
- Colorado River Water Conservation District v. United States
- Drainage law
- Grazing rights
- Optimum water content for tillage
- Permanent water rights (Alberta)
- Human right to water and sanitation
- Rio Grande border disputes
- Water conflict
- Water law
- Water law in the United States
- Water privatization in Bolivia
- Water quality
- Water resources
- Water resources law
- Water trading
- Ocean privatization
- Indus Waters Treaty
