= Privatization =

Transferring something from the public sphere to the private

Privatization (rendered privatisation in British English) can mean several different things, most commonly referring to transitioning something from the public sector into the private sector. It is also sometimes used as a synonym for deregulation when a heavily regulated private company or industry becomes less regulated. Government functions and services may also be privatised (which may also be known as "franchising" or "out-sourcing"); in this case, private entities are tasked with the implementation of government programs or performance of government services that had previously been the purview of state-run agencies. Some examples include revenue collection, law enforcement, water supply, and prison management.

Another definition is that privatization is the sale of a state-owned enterprise or municipally owned corporation to private investors; in this case shares may be traded in the public market for the first time, or for the first time since an enterprise's previous nationalization. This type of privatization can include the demutualization of a mutual organization, cooperative, or public-private partnership in order to form a joint-stock company.

Separately, privatization can refer to the purchase of all outstanding shares of a publicly traded company by private equity investors, which is more often called "going private". Before and after this process the company is privately owned, but after the buyout its shares are withdrawn from being traded at a public stock exchange. The term gained currency after Nazi Germany and Fascist Italy originally implemented various forms of the idea in their restructuring of the public sector.

== Etymology ==
The term privatizing first appeared in English, with quotation marks, in the New York Times, in April 1923, in a translation of a German speech referring to the potential for German state railroads to be bought by American companies. In German, the word Privatisierung has been used since at least the 19th century. Ultimately, the word came to German through French from the Latin privatus.

The term reprivatization, again translated directly from German (Reprivatisierung), was used frequently in the mid-1930s as The Economist reported on Nazi Germany's sale of nationalized banks back to public shareholders following the 1931 economic crisis.

The term became common in the late 1970s and early 1980s as part of British prime minister Margaret Thatcher's economic policies. She was drawing on the work of the pro-privatization Member of Parliament David Howell, who was himself drawing on the Austrian-American management expert Peter Drucker's 1969 book, The Age of Discontinuity. The word had dropped from general use till it was adopted by the Thatcher government, as explained for the first time in The Financial Times on July 28 1979 after Nigel Lawson, Financial Secretary at Treasury, used it in an interview with FT correspondent John Elliott.

== Definition ==
The word privatization may mean different things depending on the context in which it is used. It can mean moving something from the public sphere into the private sphere, but it may also be used to describe something that was always private, but heavily regulated, which becomes less regulated through a process of deregulation. The term may also be used descriptively for something that has always been private, but could be public in other jurisdictions.

There are also private entities that may perform public functions. These entities could also be described as privatized. Privatization may mean the government sells state-owned businesses to private interests, but it may also be discussed in the context of the privatization of services or government functions, where private entities are tasked with the implementation of government programs or the performance of government services. Gillian E. Metzger has written that: "Private entities [in the US] provide a vast array of social services for the government; administer core aspects of government programs; and perform tasks that appear quintessentially governmental, such as promulgating standards or regulating third-party activities." Metzger mentions an expansion of privatization that includes health and welfare programs, public education, and prisons.

Privatization can also refer to the transfer of something out of other forms of collective or communal ownership besides state ownership, such as occurs in enclosure of manorial land.

== History ==
=== Pre-20th century ===
The history of privatization dates from Ancient Greece, when governments contracted out almost everything to the private sector. In the Roman Republic private individuals and companies performed the majority of services including tax collection (tax farming), army supplies (military contractors), religious sacrifices and construction. However, the Roman Empire also created state-owned enterprises—for example, much of the grain was eventually produced on estates owned by the Emperor. David Parker and David S. Saal suggest that the cost of bureaucracy was one of the reasons for the fall of the Roman Empire.

Perhaps one of the first ideological movements towards privatization came during China's golden age of the Han dynasty. Taoism came into prominence for the first time at a state level, and it advocated the laissez-faire principle of Wu wei (無為), literally meaning "do nothing". The rulers were counseled by the Taoist clergy that a strong ruler was virtually invisible.

During the Renaissance, most of Europe was still by and large following the feudal economic model. By contrast, the Ming dynasty in China began once more to practice privatization, especially with regards to their manufacturing industries. This was a reversal of the earlier Song dynasty policies, which had themselves overturned earlier policies in favor of more rigorous state control.

In Britain, the privatization of common lands is referred to as enclosure (in Scotland as the Lowland Clearances and the Highland Clearances). Significant privatizations of this nature occurred from 1760 to 1820, preceding the Industrial Revolution in that country.

=== 20th century onwards ===
The first mass privatization of state property occurred in Nazi Germany between 1933 and 1937: "It is a fact that the government of the National Socialist Party sold off public ownership in several state-owned firms in the middle of the 1930s. The firms belonged to a wide range of sectors: steel, mining, banking, local public utilities, shipyard, ship-lines, railways, etc. In addition to this, delivery of some public services produced by public administrations prior to the 1930s, especially social services and services related to work, was transferred to the private sector, mainly to several organizations within the Nazi Party."

Great Britain privatized its steel industry in the 1950s (which had only been nationalised in 1951), and the West German government embarked on large-scale privatization, including sale of the majority stake in Volkswagen to small investors in public share offerings in 1961. However, it was in the 1980s under Margaret Thatcher in the United Kingdom and Ronald Reagan in the United States that privatization gained worldwide momentum. Notable privatizations in the UK included Britoil (1982), the radioactive-chemicals company Amersham International (1982), British Telecom (1984), Sealink ferries (1984), British Petroleum (gradually privatized between 1979 and 1987), British Aerospace (1985 to 1987), British Gas (1986), Rolls-Royce (1987), Rover Group (formerly British Leyland, 1988), British Steel Corporation (1988), Girobank (1989), and the regional water authorities of England and Wales (mostly in 1989). After 1979, council house tenants in the UK were given the right to buy their homes at a heavily discounted price; one million had purchased their residences by 1986.

Such efforts culminated in 1993 when British Rail was privatized under Thatcher's successor, John Major. British Rail had been formed by prior nationalization of private rail companies. The privatization was controversial, and its impact is still debated today, as doubling of passenger numbers and investment was balanced by an increase in rail subsidy.

These privatizations received mixed views from the public and the parliament. Even former Conservative prime minister Harold Macmillan was critical of the policy, likening it to "selling the family silver". There were around 3 million shareholders in Britain when Thatcher took office in 1979, but the subsequent sale of state-run firms saw the number of shareholders double by 1985. By the time of her resignation in 1990, there were more than 10 million shareholders in Britain.

Privatization in Latin America was extensive in the 1980s and 1990s, as a result of a Western liberal economic policy. Companies providing public services such as water management, transportation, and telecommunications were rapidly sold off to the private sector. In the 1990s, privatization revenue from 18 Latin American countries totaled 6% of gross domestic product. Private investment in infrastructure from 1990 and 2001 reached $360.5 billion, $150 billion more than in the next emerging economy.

While economists generally give favorable evaluations of the impact of privatization in Latin America, opinion polls and public protests across the countries suggest that a large segment of the public is dissatisfied with or have negative views of privatization in the region.

In the 1990s, the governments in Eastern and Central Europe engaged in extensive privatization of state-owned enterprises in Eastern and Central Europe and Russia, with assistance from the World Bank, the U.S. Agency for International Development, the German Treuhand, and other governmental and non-governmental organization.

Nippon Telegraph and Telephone's privatization in 1987 involved the largest share offering in financial history at the time. 15 of the world's 20 largest public share offerings have been privatizations of telecoms.

In 1988, the perestroika policy of Mikhail Gorbachev started allowing privatization of the centrally planned economy. Large privatization of the Soviet economy occurred over the next few years as the country dissolved. Other Eastern Bloc countries followed suit after the Revolutions of 1989 introduced non-communist governments.

Freedom House's privatization index, 1998 and 2002
Freedom House's privatization index rated transition countries from 1 (maximum progress) to 7 (no progress). The table below shows the privatization index for various Eastern European countries in 1998 and 2002:

Privatization index	1998	2002
Bulgaria	4.0	3.0
Czech Republic	2.0	1.75
Hungary	1.5	1.5
Poland	2.25	2.25
Romania	4.5	3.75
Slovakia	3.25	2.0
Slovenia	2.5	2.5
Russia	3.0	3.5

The largest public shares offering in France involved France Télécom.

Egypt undertook widespread privatization under Hosni Mubarak. Following his overthrow in the 2011 revolution, most of the public began to call for re-nationalization, citing allegations of the privatized firms practicing crony capitalism under the old regime.

== Reasons for privatization ==
There are various reasons why a government may decide to privatize; commonly due to economic reasons. The economic factors that influence a government's decision to privatize assume this will lower government debt. Studies have shown that governments are more likely to privatise with higher public debt, typically because governments do not have the needed time to wait for a return. Another economic factor that influences this area is the resulting efficiency of SOEs once privatised. Commonly, governments aren’t able to provide the investments required to ensure profitability for various reasons. These factors may lead to a government deciding to privatize.

== Forms of privatization ==
There are several main methods of privatization:

1. Share issue privatization: shares of the enterprise are sold on the stock market.
2. Asset sale privatization: asset divestiture to a strategic investor, usually by auction or through the Treuhand model.
3. Voucher privatization: distribution of vouchers, which represent part ownership of a corporation, to all citizens, usually for free or at a very low price.
4. Privatization from below: start of new private businesses in formerly socialist countries.
5. Management buyout: purchase of public shares by management of the company, sometimes by borrowing from external lenders
6. Employee buyout: distribution of shares for free or at a very low price to workers or management of the organization.

The choice of sale method is influenced by the capital market and the political and firm-specific factors. Privatization through the stock market is more likely to be the method used when there is an established capital market capable of absorbing the shares. A market with high liquidity can facilitate the privatization. If the capital markets are insufficiently developed, however, it would be difficult to find enough buyers. The shares may have to be underpriced, and the sales may not raise as much capital as would be justified by the fair value of the company being privatized. Many governments, therefore, elect for listings in more sophisticated markets, for example, Euronext, and the London, New York and Hong Kong stock exchanges.

Governments in developing countries and transition countries more often resort to direct asset sales to a few investors, partly because those countries do not yet have a stock market with high capital.

Voucher privatization occurred mainly in the transition economies in Central and Eastern Europe, such as Russia, Poland, the Czech Republic, and Slovakia. Additionally, privatization from below had made important contribution to economic growth in transition economies.

In one study assimilating some of the literature on "privatization" that occurred in Russian and Czech Republic transition economies, the authors identified three methods of privatization: "privatization by sale", "mass privatization", and "mixed privatization". Their calculations showed that "mass privatization" was the most effective method.

However, in economies "characterized by shortages" and maintained by the state bureaucracy, wealth was accumulated and concentrated by "gray/black market" operators. Privatizing industries by sale to these individuals did not mean a transition to "effective private sector owners [of former] state assets". Rather than mainly participating in a market economy, these individuals could prefer elevating their personal status or prefer accumulating political power. Instead, outside foreign investment led to the efficient conduct of former state assets in the private sector and market economy.

Through privatization by direct asset sale or the stock market, bidders compete to offer higher prices, generating more revenue for the state. Voucher privatization, on the other hand, could represent a genuine transfer of assets to the general population, creating a sense of participation and inclusion. A market could be created if the government permits transfer of vouchers among voucher holders.

=== Secured borrowing ===
Some privatization transactions can be interpreted as a form of a secured loan and are criticized as a "particularly noxious form of governmental debt". In this interpretation, the upfront payment from the privatization sale corresponds to the principal amount of the loan, while the proceeds from the underlying asset correspond to secured interest payments—the transaction can be considered substantively the same as a secured loan, though it is structured as a sale. This interpretation is particularly argued to apply to recent municipal transactions in the United States, particularly for fixed term, such as the 2008 sale of the proceeds from Chicago parking meters for 75 years. It is argued that this is motivated by "politicians' desires to borrow money surreptitiously", due to legal restrictions on and political resistance to alternative sources of revenue, viz, raising taxes or issuing debt.

== Results of privatization ==
Privatization had different outcomes around the world. Results of privatization may vary depending on the privatization model employed. According to Irwin Stelzer, "it is somewhere between difficult and impossible to separate the effects of privatisation from the effects of such things as trends in the economy".

According to research performed by the World Bank and William L. Megginson in the early 2000s, privatization in competitive industries with well-informed consumers consistently improved efficiency. According to APEC, the more competitive the industry, the greater the improvement in output, profitability, and efficiency. Such efficiency gains produce a one-off increase in GDP, and – through improved incentives to innovate and reduce costs – also tend to raise the rate of economic growth.

More recent research and literature review performed by Professor Saul Estrin and Adeline Pelletier concluded that "the literature now reflects a more cautious and nuanced evaluation of privatization" and that "private ownership alone is no longer argued to automatically generate economic gains in developing economies". According to a 2008 study published in Annals of Public and Cooperative Economics, liberalization and privatization have produced mixed results.

Although typically there are many costs associated with these efficiency gains, in 1999, IMF economists argued that these could be dealt with by appropriate government support through redistribution and perhaps retraining. Some empirical literature suggests that privatization could also have very modest effects on efficiency and quite regressive distributive impact. In the first attempt at a social welfare analysis of the British privatization program under the Conservative governments of Margaret Thatcher and John Major during the 1980s and 1990s, Massimo Florio points to the absence of any productivity shock resulting strictly from ownership change. Instead, the impact on the previously nationalized companies of the UK productivity leap under the Conservatives varied in different industries. In some cases, it occurred prior to privatization, and in other cases, it occurred upon privatization or several years afterward.

A 2012 study published by the European Commission argues that privatisation in Europe had mixed effects on service quality and achieved only minor productivity gains, driven mainly by lower labour input combined with other cost-cutting strategies that led to a deterioration of employment and working conditions. Another study by the commission found that the British rail network (which was privatized from 1994 to 1997) was most improved out of all the 27 EU nations from 1997 to 2012. The report examined a range of 14 factors and the UK came top in four of the factors, second and third in another two and fourth in three, coming top overall. Nonetheless, the impact of the privatisation of British Rail has been the subject of much debate, with the stated benefits including improved customer service, and more investment; and stated drawbacks including higher fares, lower punctuality and increased rail subsidies.

Privatizations in Russia and Latin America were accompanied by large-scale corruption during the sale of the state-owned companies. Those with political connections unfairly gained large wealth, which has discredited privatization in these regions. While media have widely reported the grand corruption that accompanied those sales, according to research released by the World Bank there has been increased operating efficiency, daily petty corruption is, or would be, larger without privatization, and that corruption is more prevalent in non-privatized sectors. Furthermore, according to the World Bank extralegal and unofficial activities are more prevalent in countries that privatized less. Other research suggests that privatization in Russia resulted in a dramatic rise in the level of economic inequality and a collapse in GDP and industrial output.

Russian president Boris Yeltsin's IMF-backed rapid privatization schemes saw half the Russian population fall into destitution in just several years as unemployment climbed to double digits by the early to mid 1990s. A 2009 study published in The Lancet medical journal has found that as many as a million working men died as a result of economic shocks associated with mass privatization in the former Soviet Union and in Eastern Europe during the 1990s, although a further study suggested that there were errors in their method and "correlations reported in the original article are simply not robust." A subsequent body of scholarship, while still controversial, demonstrates that rapid privatization schemes associated with neoliberal economic reforms did result in poorer health outcomes in former Eastern Bloc countries during the transition to markets economies, with the World Health Organization contributing to the debate by stating "IMF economic reform programs are associated with significantly worsened tuberculosis incidence, prevalence, and mortality rates in post-communist Eastern European and former Soviet countries." Historian Walter Scheidel, a specialist in ancient history, posits that economic inequality and wealth concentration in the top percentile "had been made possible by the transfer of state assets to private owners."

In Latin America, on the one hand, according to John Nellis's research for Center for Global Development, economic indicators, including firm profitability, productivity, and growth, project positive microeconomic results. On the other hand, however, privatisation has been largely met with a negative criticism and citizen coalitions. This neoliberal criticism highlights the ongoing conflict between varying visions of economic development. Karl Polanyi emphasizes the societal concerns of self-regulating markets through a concept known as a "double movement". In essence, whenever societies move towards increasingly unrestrained, free-market rule, a natural and inevitable societal correction emerges to undermine the contradictions of capitalism. This was the case in the 2000 Cochabamba protests.

Privatization in Latin America has invariably experienced increasing push-back from the public. Mary Shirley from The Ronald Coase Institute suggests that implementing a less efficient but more politically mindful approach could be more sustainable.

In India, a survey by the National Commission for Protection of Child Rights (NCPCR) – Utilization of Free Medical Services by Children Belonging to the Economically Weaker Section (EWS) in Private Hospitals in New Delhi, 2011–12: A Rapid Appraisal – indicates under-utilization of the free beds available for EWS category in private hospitals in Delhi, though they were allotted land at subsidized rates.

In Australia a "People's Inquiry into Privatisation" (2016/17) found that the impact of privatisation on communities was negative. The report from the inquiry "Taking Back Control" made a range of recommendations to provide accountability and transparency in the process. The report highlighted privatisation in healthcare, aged care, child care, social services, government departments, electricity, prisons and vocational education featuring the voices of workers, community members and academics.

Some reports show that the results of privatization are experienced differently between men and women for numerous reasons: when public services are privatized women are expected to take on the health and social care of dependents, women have less access to privatized goods, public sector employs a larger proportion of women than does the private sector, and the women in the public sector are more likely to be unionized than those in the private sector. In Chile, women are disproportionately affected by the privatization of the pension system because factors such as "women's longer life expectancy, earlier retirement age, and lower rates of labor-force participation, lower salaries" affect their ability to accumulate funds for retirement which leads to lower pensions. Low-income women face an even greater burden; Anjela Taneja, of Oxfam India says "The privatization of public services...implies limited or no access to essential services for women living in poverty, who are often the ones more in need of these services."

The increase in privatization since the 1980s has been a factor in rising income and wealth inequality in the United States.

== Foreign privatization ==
Due to low levels of native capital accumulation in the former Central and Eastern Europe, the rapid privatization preferred by international institutions (EBRD, IMF, World Bank) and other foreign banks was a de facto call for international bidding, reflecting the assumption that foreign investment would play a major role.

=== Contrasting cases in Eastern Europe: Romania and East Germany ===
In post-reunification East Germany, by the end of June 1992, the Treuhandanstalt had privatized 8,175 companies, with 5,950 left on hand (4,340 remaining to be sold and the remainder to be liquidated). June 1992 was also when the last East German on the board of the Treuhand left. By the end of 1994, Treuhand had sold almost everything, having only 65 firms left to privatize as of December 1994. More than 80% of the privatized businesses were bought by foreigners (chiefly West Germans – 75%).

Romania's first privatization took place on 3 August 1992. There was "very little" privatization during 1992: only 22 state-owned enterprises were privatized. The pace picked up throughout the following year, with more than 260 companies privatized. Four of the 22 enterprises privatized in 1992 were sold to foreign investors. In 1993, 265 companies were privatized, followed by 604 in 1994. Two companies were sold to foreign investors during this period, one each in 1993 and 1994. At the start of 1999, 4,330 companies were left to be privatized, with 5,476 having been sold during 1993–1998. At the end of 1998, only 2.4% of privatized companies had foreign participation.

== Opinion ==
Arguments for and against the controversial subject of privatization are presented here.

=== Support ===
Proponents of privatization argue that, over time, this can lead to lower prices, improved quality, more choices, less corruption, less red tape, and/or quicker delivery. Many proponents do not argue that everything should be privatized. According to them, market failures and natural monopolies could be problematic. However, anarcho-capitalists prefer that every function of the state be privatized, including defense and dispute resolution.

Proponents of privatization make the following arguments:

- Performance: state-run industries tend to be bureaucratic. A political government may only be motivated to improve a function when its poor performance becomes politically sensitive.
- Increased efficiency: private companies and firms have a greater incentive to produce goods and services more efficiently to increase profits.
- Specialization: a private business has the ability to focus all relevant human and financial resources onto specific functions. A state-owned firm does not have the necessary resources to specialize its goods and services as a result of the general products provided to the greatest number of people in the population.
- Improvements: conversely, the government may put off improvements due to political sensitivity and special interests—even in cases of companies that are run well and better serve their customers' needs.
- Corruption: a state-monopolized function is prone to corruption; decisions are made primarily for political reasons, personal gain of the decision-maker (i.e. "graft"), rather than economic ones. Corruption (or principal–agent issues) in a state-run corporation affects the ongoing asset stream and company performance, whereas any corruption that may occur during the privatization process is a one-time event and does not affect ongoing cash flow or performance of the company.
- Accountability: managers of privately owned companies are accountable to their owners/shareholders and to the consumer, and can only exist and thrive where needs are met. Managers of publicly owned companies are required to be more accountable to the broader community and to political "stakeholders". This can reduce their ability to directly and specifically serve the needs of their customers, and can bias investment decisions away from otherwise profitable areas.
- Civil-liberty concerns: a company controlled by the state may have access to information or assets which may be used against dissidents or any individuals who disagree with their policies.
- Goals: a political government tends to run an industry or company for political goals rather than economic ones.
- Capital: a privately held companies can sometimes more easily raise investment capital in the financial markets when such local markets exist and are suitably liquid. While interest rates for private companies are often higher than for government debt, this can serve as a useful constraint to promote efficient investments by private companies, instead of cross-subsidizing them with the overall credit-risk of the country. Investment decisions are then governed by market interest rates. State-owned industries have to compete with demands from other government departments and special interests. In either case, for smaller markets, political risk may add substantially to the cost of capital.
- Security: governments have had the tendency to "bail out" poorly run businesses, often due to the sensitivity of job losses, when economically, it may be better to let the business fold.
- Lack of market discipline: poorly managed state companies are insulated from the same discipline as private companies, which could go bankrupt, have their management removed, or be taken over by competitors. Private companies are also able to take greater risks and then seek bankruptcy protection against creditors if those risks turn sour.
- Natural monopolies: the existence of natural monopolies does not mean that these sectors must be state owned. Governments can enact or are armed with anti-trust legislation and bodies to deal with anti-competitive behavior of all companies public or private.
- Concentration of wealth: ownership of and profits from successful enterprises tend to be dispersed and diversified—particularly in voucher privatization. The availability of more investment vehicles stimulates capital markets and promotes liquidity and job creation.
- Political influence: nationalized industries are prone to interference from politicians for political or populist reasons. Examples include making an industry buy supplies from local producers (when that may be more expensive than buying from abroad), forcing an industry to freeze its prices/fares to satisfy the electorate or control inflation, increasing its staffing to reduce unemployment, or moving its operations to marginal constituencies.
- Profits: corporations exist to generate profits for their shareholders. Private companies make a profit by enticing consumers to buy their products in preference to their competitors' (or by increasing primary demand for their products, or by reducing costs). Private corporations typically profit more if they serve the needs of their clients well. Corporations of different sizes may target different market niches in order to focus on marginal groups and satisfy their demand. A company with good corporate governance will therefore be incentivized to meet the needs of its customers efficiently.
- Job gains: as the economy becomes more efficient, more profits are obtained and no government subsidies and less taxes are needed, there will be more private money available for investments and consumption and more profitable and better-paid jobs will be created than in the case of a more regulated economy.

=== Opposition ===
Opponents of privatization in general—or of certain privatizations in particular—believe that public goods and services should remain primarily in the hands of government in order to ensure that everyone in society has access to them (such as law enforcement, basic health care, and basic education). There is a positive externality when the government provides society at large with public goods and services such as defense and disease control. Some national constitutions in effect define their governments' "core businesses" as being the provision of such things as justice, tranquility, defense, and general welfare. These governments' direct provision of security, stability, and safety, is intended to be done for the common good (in the public interest) with a long-term (for posterity) perspective. As for natural monopolies, opponents of privatization claim that they aren't subject to fair competition, and better administrated by the state.

Although private companies may provide a similar good or service alongside the government, opponents of privatization are critical about completely transferring the provision of public goods, services and assets into private hands for the following reasons:

- Performance: a democratically elected government is accountable to the people through a legislature, Congress or Parliament, and is motivated to safeguarding the assets of the nation. The profit motive may be subordinated to social objectives.
- Improvements: the government is motivated to performance improvements as well run businesses contribute to the State's revenues.
- Corruption: government ministers and civil servants are bound to uphold the highest ethical standards, and standards of probity are guaranteed through codes of conduct and declarations of interest.
- Accountability: the public has less control and oversight of private companies.
- Civil-liberty concerns: a democratically elected government is accountable to the people through a parliament, and can intervene when civil liberties are threatened.
- Goals: the government may seek to use state companies as instruments to further social goals for the benefit of the nation as a whole.
- Capital: governments can raise money in the financial markets most cheaply to re-lend to state-owned enterprises.
- Cuts in essential services: if a government-owned company providing an essential service (such as the water supply) to all citizens is privatized, its new owner(s) could lead to the abandoning of the social obligation to those who are less able to pay, or to regions where this service is unprofitable.
- Natural monopolies: privatization will not result in true competition if a natural monopoly exists.
- Concentration of wealth: profits from successful enterprises end up in private hands instead of being available for public use.
- Political influence: governments may more easily exert pressure on state-owned firms to help implement government policy.
- Profit: private companies do not have any goal other than to maximize profits.
- Privatization and poverty: it is acknowledged by many studies that there are winners and losers with privatization. The number of losers—which may add up to the size and severity of poverty—can be unexpectedly large if the method and process of privatization and how it is implemented are seriously flawed (e.g. lack of transparency leading to state-owned assets being appropriated at minuscule amounts by those with political connections, absence of regulatory institutions leading to transfer of monopoly rents from public to private sector, improper design and inadequate control of the privatization process leading to asset stripping).
- Job loss: due to the additional financial burden placed on privatized companies to succeed without any government help, unlike the public companies, jobs could be lost to keep more money in the company.
- Reduced wages and benefits: a 2014 report by In the Public Interest, a resource center on privatization, argues that "outsourcing public services sets off a downward spiral in which reduced worker wages and benefits can hurt the local economy and overall stability of middle and working class communities."
- Inferior quality products: private, for-profit companies cut corners on providing quality goods and services in order to maximize profit.

== Economic theory ==
In economic theory, privatization has been studied in the field of contract theory. When contracts are complete, institutions such as (private or public) property are difficult to explain, since every desired incentive structure can be achieved with sufficiently complex contractual arrangements, regardless of the institutional structure. All that matters is who are the decision makers and what is their available information. In contrast, when contracts are incomplete, institutions matter. A leading application of the incomplete contract paradigm in the context of privatization is the model by Hart, Shleifer, and Vishny (1997). In their model, a manager can make investments to increase quality (but they may also increase costs) and investments to decrease costs (but they may also reduce quality). It turns out that it depends on the particular situation whether private ownership or public ownership is desirable. The Hart-Shleifer-Vishny model has been further developed in various directions, e.g. to allow for mixed public-private ownership and endogenous assignments of the investment tasks.

== Privatization of private companies ==
Privatization can also refer to the purchase of all outstanding shares of a publicly traded private company by private equity investors, which is more often called "going private". The buyout withdraws the company's shares from being traded at a public stock exchange. Depending on the involvement of internal and external investors, it may occur through a leveraged buyout or a management buyout, tender offer, or hostile takeover.

== See also ==
- CC–PP game
- Commercialization
- Commodification
- Corporatization
- Deregulation
- Equitisation
- Foreign direct investment
- Foreign ownership
- Kibbutz
- List of nationalizations by country
- List of privatizations by country
- Marketization
- Nationalization
- Ocean privatization
- Postal service privatization
- Private intelligence agency
- Privately owned public space
- Private military company
- Private police
- Private prison
- Private railway
- Private road
- Private sector development
- Private spaceflight
- Privatization fund
- Privatization in criminal justice
- Privatized foreign currency risk
- Structural adjustment
- Transit privatization
- Water privatization
- Welfare reform
