= Climate refuge =

Area that is stable amid climate change

Climate refuge or climate haven describes a place that would be relatively more desirable due to climate change. Most scientists do not think there are places that would not be significantly negatively impacted by climate change.

Some US cities have promoted themselves as a better long-term place to live in order to attract more residents or investment.

== History ==
=== United States ===
In 2018, the term started to become more common, fueled by people looking for hope amidst climate change and by localities that took the chance to promote themselves, particularly in the Rust Belt.

By 2024, some real estate listings promote climate scores that estimate the level of climate risk exposure to a property. Hurricane Helene devastating Asheville, North Carolina prompted the New York Times to publish a piece that quoted professors who were largely critical of the concept while arguing that some areas would still be relatively less costly to live in and adapt to than others even if climate change impacts all parts of the country.

== See also ==
- Climate migration
- Continuously habitable zone (describes planets that could potentially become potential climate refuges after the main habitable planet becomes uninhabitable)
- Formation and evolution of the Solar System § The Sun and planetary environments (speculates the possibility of the Solar System's outer planets and moons becoming climate refuges after Earth becomes uninhabitable)
- Great filter
- Internally displaced person
- Future of Earth § Loss of oceans (describes the final climate refuges for life, even microbes, once Earth permanently becomes uninhabitable)
- Life on Titan § Future temperature (speculates Saturn's largest moon Titan as a potential climate refuge after Earth becomes uninhabitable)
- Managed retreat
