= Hermann Josef Hack =

German artist

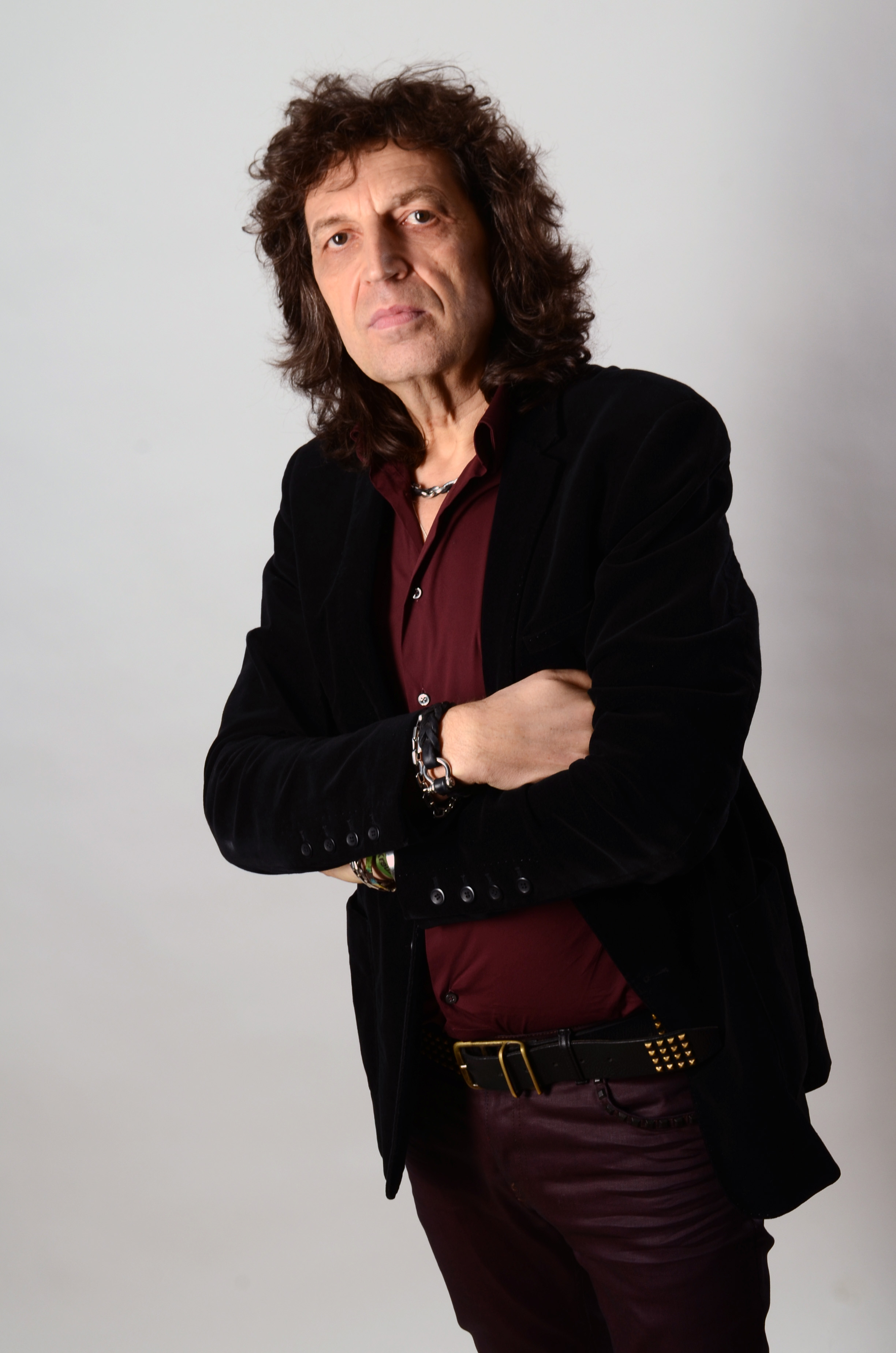

Hermann Josef Hack (born 20 June 1956 in Hoevel/Bad Honnef, North Rhine-Westphalia) is a German artist, founder of the Global Brainstorming Project (1991), a platform to provide communication of researchers, scientists with the general public by the means of art. Influenced by his teacher Joseph Beuys, Hack develops the social sculpture ("Soziale Plastik") of Beuys with a global aspect and is the first to import it into the cyberspace dimension. Hack's large paintings on tarpaulin and works on paper deal with the challenges of global change and their cultural, social dimensions. Hack was one of the first media artists using the Internet, one of the most famous projects is the virtual roof, where everybody could get a piece of the sky above a German city. Public interventions with the World Climate Refugee Camp, a model camp made of 1.000 miniature tents, since 2007 to visualize the plight of millions of climate refugees in the center of European cities.
