= Climate gentrification =

Climate gentrification is a type of climate migration where households and communities face economic stress and potential displacement as the demand for lower-risk geographies increases from populations leaving areas impacted by climate change. Those affected by this phenomenon are typically in coastal cities, islands, and other vulnerable areas, susceptible to rising sea levels, wildfires, extreme weather events, and other climate-related disasters. It is a theory that examines the relationship between the environmental climate and the effects this has on cities and communities, particularly alongside the coast. It examines things like the impact on the economy, living situations, health, and community satisfaction.

== Origin ==
Gentrification is a process of economic displacement where areas of lower socioeconomic status are quickly changed by wealthier people moving in. They increase the cost of living and displace lower class residents. The climate crisis is a global displacement process. Wealthy people take advantage of this displacement as they would on a smaller scale, establishing "climate gentrification." Climate gentrification may manifest in one of three ways. In the Superior Investment Pathway, demand for housing and real estate increases as people move from a risky area to an area with lower risk. In the Cost-Burden Pathway, only wealthy people can bear the costs of living in high-risk areas, as lower socioeconomic status households are forced to leave because of increased costs and risks. Finally, in the Resilience Investment Pathway, rents and the value of properties leads to displacement effects as an unintended consequence of investments in resilience and risk reduction infrastructure that lowers risks and increased the amenity value of the community.

== Causes ==
Historically, vulnerable areas located near seas and beaches excluded marginalized groups and are populated by high-income communities. The unpredictability of climate change has reversed this trend as wealthy communities begin to move inland to prioritize the safety and value of their property. This widespread displacement of lower income groups can be attributed to the security of higher ground that has become prioritized by coastal cities. The threat of more extreme weather and rising sea levels is motivating factor for investors to purchase property in a geologically safer location, simultaneously taking advantage of the cheaper property values.

Rapid urbanization in coastal and wetland areas driven by economic, cultural, and environmental factors, has also increased the number of individuals exposed to flooding. As displacement occurs, opportunities for those with the means appear both coastal and inland.

Natural disaster events, specifically hurricanes, are also drivers of displacement. Climate-related disasters in 2018 alone displaced more than 1.2 million people. In 2024, Hurricane Helene was responsible for $78.7 billion worth of damage and economic loss to Southern United States (mostly Florida and the Carolinas), along with other countries and territories around the Atlantic Ocean. Experts cite climate change as the reason why rainfall was 10% heavier and rainfall totals over the two-day and three-day maxima were respectively 40% and 70%, more likely due to record hot sea-surface temperatures.

== Effects ==
Climate gentrification causes low-income and minority communities to bear a disproportionate social and economic burden. As wealthier home owners move towards safer locations due to climate disasters, the cost of living increases and longtime low-income residents are displaced. In elevated regions of Miami, for example, property has appreciated at a higher rate than anywhere else in the country. Globally, more than 30 million people were displaced in 2020, 98% due to weather and climate hazards. Displacement, due to extreme weather events, results in developers taking advantage of lower property prices and investing in expensive projects that cater to wealthier people. Once affordable homes are destroyed and expensive structures replace them, low-income residents are forced out of their communities.

Socially, migration results in demographic turnover, which causes the loss of community identity and cultural disruption. Long-time residents are suffer from these changes, as many see friends and family forced out by wealthy newcomers.
