= Sujatha Byravan =

Sujatha Byravan is a biologist and journalist. She has several years of experience in the broad area of sustainable development, which is bolstered by her technical background and education in biological sciences. Her PhD and Postdoctoral work in the US were followed by a 2-year training fellowship from the Rockefeller Foundation in leadership and environment and development, work experience in India, and a leadership position as main architect and Fellows Program Director (New York and London) in an international environment and development organization.

== Education ==
Byravan received a PhD in molecular biology in 1989 from the University of South Carolina. She completed post-doctoral work from 1993 to 1995 at UCLA.

== Career ==
She then worked in India as a science writer and freelance journalist. Topics she has written on include science policy, gender issues, and Indian environmental concerns and politics. During that time, Byravan also became a fellow of the Rockefeller Foundation's LEAD (Leadership for Environment and Development) Program (1995 to 1997). She later served as Director of the Fellows Program at LEAD International from 1999-2002, and in that capacity was responsible for developing and executing the program for the graduates of LEAD, who number over 1,300 and work all over the world in various sectors. Between 2002 and 2007, she was Executive Director and President of the Council for Responsible Genetics (CRG), a non-profit/non-governmental organization devoted to fostering informed debate on the social, ethical and environmental implications of new genetic technologies. CRG carries out policy research, education and advocacy.

Byravan is also a fellow of the Salzburg Global Seminar on Biotechnology: Legal, Ethical and Social Issues. She received a Rockefeller Foundation Residential Fellowship at Bellagio in 2007.

== Selected publications ==
- "Before the Flood". New York Times. May 9, 2005.
- "Ensuring privacy in genetic testing". Boston Globe. Byravan & Matlaw. November 2, 2005.
- "DNA Typing - A Technology of Fear".Development, Vol. 49, No. 4, pp. 28–32, 2006
- "Louise Brown will turn 28 this year. The Indian Express. March 17, 2006.
- "Gender and Innovation in South Asia (PDF)". Innovation, Policy and Science. February 2008.
- "The Climate Exile Alarm"" The Hindu. July 15, 2009.
- "Where's the science in GM crops?". IndiaTogether. November 6, 2009.
- "Warming up to Immigrants: An Option for US Climate Policy".Economic and Political Weekly, November 7, 2009.
- "The Ethical Implications of Sea-Level Rise Due to Climate Change".Ethics and International Affairs, Fall 2010.
- "The Inter-Academy Report on Genetically Engineered Crops: Is It Making a Farce of Science?". Economic and Political Weekly, October 23, 2010.
- "Climate Change: Sea Level Rise Initiative". November 2010.
- "Development Benefits from a Low-Carbon Pathway". Economic and Political Weekly, August 20, 2011.
- "Below the Guard Rail" Economic and Political Weekly, December 29, 2018.
- "The Twisted Trajectory of Bt Cotton" The Hindu. September 10, 2020.
