= Permanent water rights (Alberta) =

Permanent water rights, within the Canadian province of Alberta, are rights acquired from the crown that give the holder rights to use a body of water for a specified purpose, and for an indefinite time.
