= Climate migration and water rights =

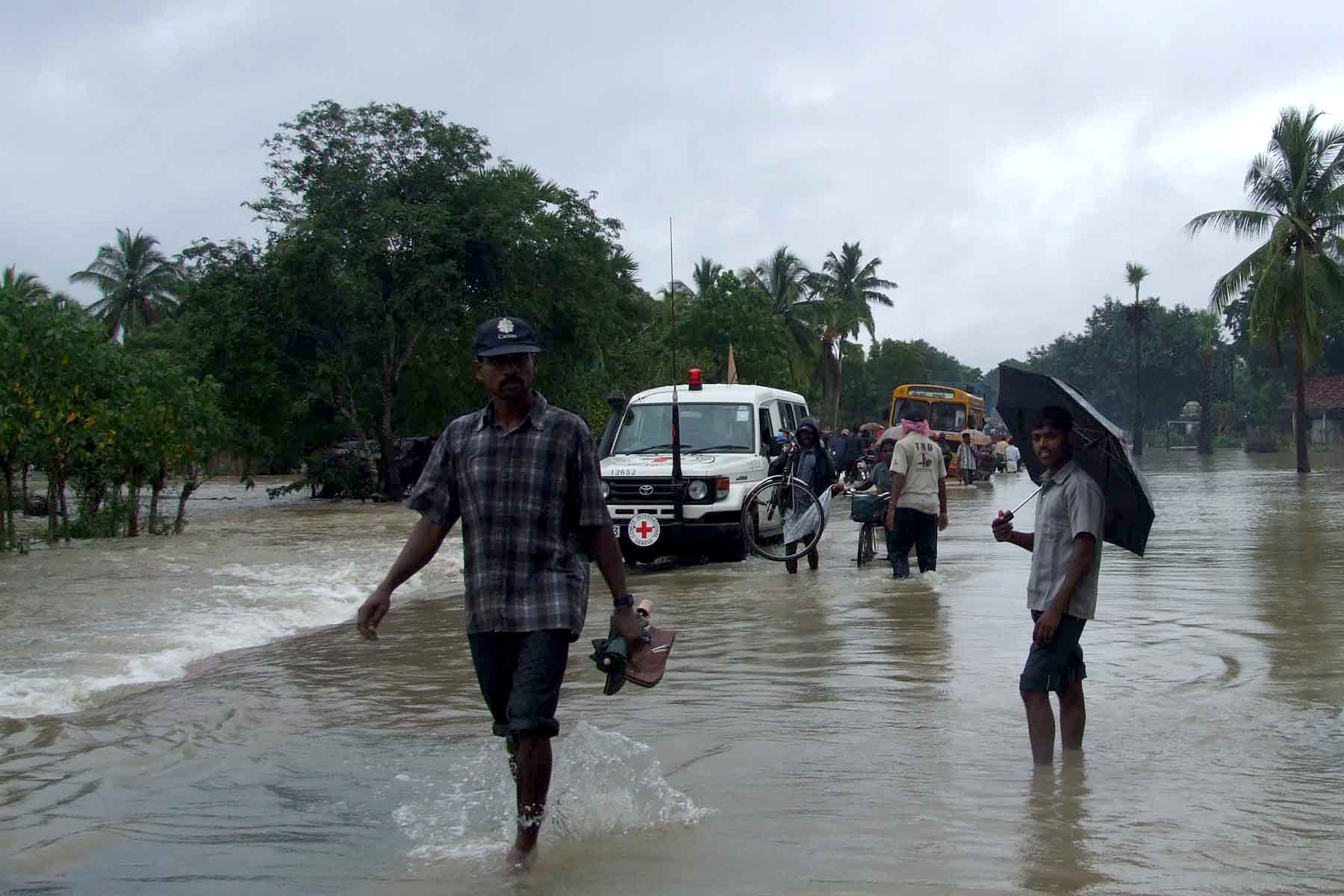
Internally displaced peoples as the result of a monsoon in Vanni, Sri Lanka, in 2008.

Climate migration is the displacement of individuals, both within countries and across borders, as a result of climate-related disasters. This can include sudden events like as hurricanes and floods, as well as incremental events like desertification and sea-level rise. The frequency and intensity of these disasters force more and more people to relocate in favor of safety and stability.

Water rights include the human right to access safe and clean drinking water. Recognized as essential for life, access to clean water is critical, especially for displaced populations like refugees and asylum seekers. The right to water and sanitation is a basic human right according to several international legal frameworks, including the Universal Declaration of Human Rights and the International Covenant on Economic, Social and Cultural Rights.

Combined, the impact of climate change on water access and quality affects millions. Locations with higher water stress levels like the Middle East, North Africa, and South Asia, feel this impact acutely. Climate change-induced water scarcity poses challenges for vulnerable populations, including indigenous communities, poorer communities, and people of color, who are affected more by environmental crises.

== Climate migration ==
The number of climate migrants displaced by natural disasters globally increased 41 percent from 2008 to 2022, with some studies predicting that up to 1.2 billion people could be displaced by the year 2050. These impacts could lead to the rapid spread of diseases and food shortages. Advocacy groups and institutions such as The International Human Rights Clinic at Harvard Law School have set their focuses on the intersection of climate change and human rights, in attempts to discern a framework that can be implemented when the right to clean water has been violated in international law.

Analysis by the World Bank Group of data representing 64 countries between 1960 and 2015 found that a lack of water was a significant driver of increasing global migration, and that dry rainfall shocks (periods of time with precipitation levels significantly below average) are expected to have the most significant impact on migration of water related events.

== Changing water cycle ==
Climate warming is causing the water cycle to speed up, a process known as water cycle intensification. This process contributes to more frequent and intense weather events like changing sea levels, and greater temperatures fluctuation. Studies point to global warming increasing the average amount of precipitation year after year. This allows more moisture to enter into weather systems, driving the mean wetness of wet seasons to increase. Warming over land has led to increases the severity of droughts.

A 2004 analysis of water runoff found that fluctuations correlated with increases of carbon dioxide lead to a link between the intensification of the water cycle and global warming has been shown by experimental-based evidence. Another study from 2000 found that places with long-term records in the Global Soil Moisture Data Bank were trending upwards in their soil moisture. Other variables that have been explored pertaining to the intensification of the water cycle include precipitation (also trending upwards), actual evapotranspiration (increasing), floods (no change), and droughts, which were found to be increasing in the latter half of the 20th century. Even if the frequency of floods has remained the same, due to increased soil moisture, it is expected the severity of floods will be more desvistating.

== Who is most affected ==
People disproportionately impacted by climate change and displacement include those living in the Global South and small island developing states (SIDS), despite having contributed the least to global greenhouse gas emissions (GHGs) historically. Regions that face the most water stress include the Middle East and North Africa, where 83% of inhabitants face high water stress, and South Asia, where 74% of inhabitants face high water stress. Indigenous communities are disproportionately displaced by climate change at seven times the rate of the entire global population. People of color whom are already impacted by socioeconomic inequalities are also disproportionately impacted by climate change, and are at higher risk of climate related health impacts than their white counterparts.

In terms of demographics, climate migration has been shown to disproportionately affect women, as many remain in dangerous environments to assume household responsibilities whilst men seek more prosperous livelihoods elsewhere. Another result of climate migration is the deepening of gender divides, as women are more likely to face discrimination and abuse, socioeconomic inequality, face lack of information and resources, and have the least capacity to respond to climate disasters. Children, especially older girls, are also extremely vulnerable to climate migration, as many have to sacrifice their education to take on more familial roles at home. Women and children are most often responsible for water collection and there tend to be the most impacted by water scarcity. They may also be impacted by torrential rains or floods which can result in school absences, or be separated from their families and forced to live in unstable living arrangements as a result.

== Human rights law ==
Human rights law refers to a combination of international treaties and other instruments with the aim of protecting the rights of humans. It operates with the understanding that all humans have dignity and have basic, fundamental rights afforded to them. The Universal Declaration of Human RIghts, adopted by the United Nations General Assembly in 1948, sets out fundamental human rights that should be afforded to all people, and was the first document to do so. This Declaration, combined with the International Covenant on Civil and Political Rights and its two Optional Protocols, and the International Covenant on Economic, Social and Cultural Rights, which add on to the Universal Declaration of Human Rights, forms the International Bill of Human Rights. The right to life, right to freedom from torture and inhumane treatment, right to equal treatment before the law, right to privacy, and right to education and the enjoyment of benefits of cultural freedom and scientific progress are all examples of rights deemed fundamental by the International Bill of Human Rights. Access to water and sanitation also constitutes a fundamental human right recognized by the United Nations.

Despite the significance of certain rights being recognized as fundamental to the United Nations, enforcing this proves to be extremely difficult. A lack of effective follow up measures, disagreement among member states about whether or not to intervene, and a ban on the use of force have curtailed enforcement efforts by the United Nations. However, peer pressure from other states has emerged as an effective potential manner of promoting rule following.

=== Right to clean water ===
In 2010 the United Nations General Assembly adopted a resolution declaring access to safe and clean drinking water as a human right. This right applies universally, including to displaced populations, including refugees and asylum seekers.

In 2020 the UN Human Rights Committee (HRC) set a precedent in Teitiota v. New Zealand, that forcibly returning a person to a place where their life would be at risk due to the impact of climate change may violate the right to life, according to the International Covenant on Civil and Political Rights (ICCPR). This occurred after Ioane Teitiota, from the Pacific nation of Kiribati, was facing land disputes and inability to access safe drinking water as the result of the climate crisis, which forced him to migrate to New Zealand. Upon arrival he was denied asylum as a climate refugee and was deported. Although he was deported, this "ruling has nevertheless been lauded as 'landmark' because the HRC accepted that states have an obligation not to forcibly return individuals to places where climate changes poses a real risk to their right to life. Consequently, it represents a significant jurisprudential development in the protection of climate refugees under international human rights law."

=== International law ===
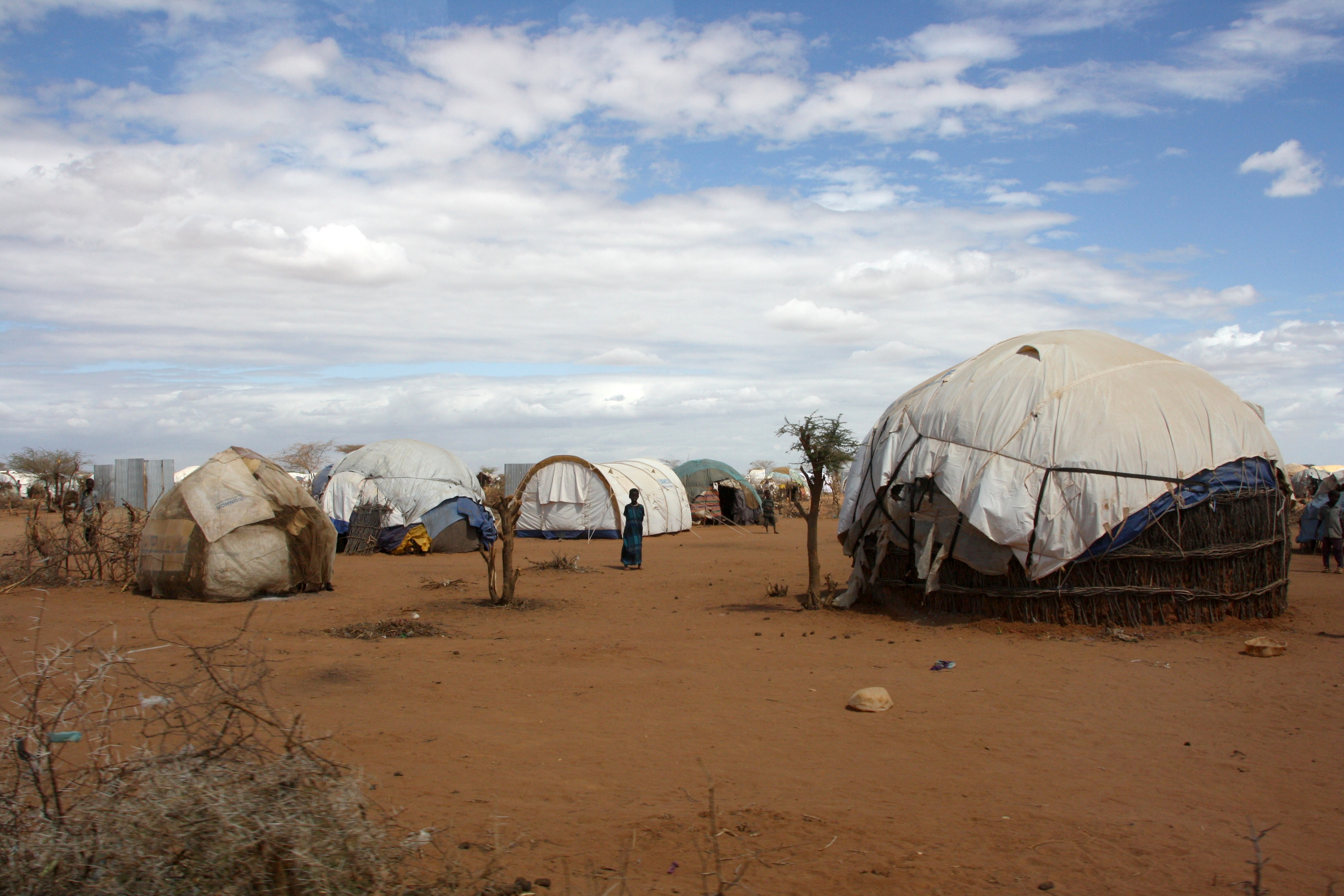
Camps built in Kenya for displaced migrants due to 2011 Horn of Africa drought.

The denial of access to clean water constitutes a violation of states' obligations to uphold human rights under international law. These obligations are articulated in the Universal Declaration of Human Rights (UDHR) and the International Covenant on Economic, Social and Cultural Rights (ICESCR). In the UDHR Article 25 specifically recognizes access to clean water. These obligations extend to all individuals in a state's jurisdiction with no bearing on their legal or migratory status. Refugees and other vulnerable groups are entitled to adequate water and sanitation services.

== Future action ==
The UNHCR reported thirty-two million people were displaced in 2022 because of weather-related hazards. This number includes water-based disasters (hurricanes and floods), as well as water-scarcity disasters like desertification. By 2050 experts claim the number of climate refugees could expand to around 1.2 billion.

Countries are passing legislation to combat these changes. European Green Deal and the Paris Agreement, aim to stem migration and improving water rights. The European Green Deal's goal to achieve carbon neutrality by 2050 prioritizes renewable energy, sustainable industry, and the preservation of biodiversity to combat climate displacement. The Paris Agreement strives to reduce the global temperature average to pre-industrial levels. These acts prioritize collaboration. They are also gathering resources to support vulnerable nations in confronting climate change and strengthening water access and security.
