= Ocean privatization =

Privatisation of ocean (similar to land ownership)

Ocean privatization is the sale of the oceans to private individuals or companies.

The Market for Liberty, published in 1970, stated that "as companies drilling for off-shore oil have proved, there is no reason why a piece of land cannot be owned and used simply because it is covered by water." In proposing privatization, Walter Block stated that "there are vast areas of human existence where private property rights play no role at all: oceans, seas, rivers and other bodies of water. But why should we expect that there would be any better results from such 'water socialism' than we have experienced from socialism on land?" Murray Rothbard's For a New Liberty likewise notes, "Anyone can capture fish in the ocean, or extract its resources, but only on the run, only as hunters and gatherers. No one can farm the ocean, no one can engage in aquaculture. In this way we are deprived of the use of the immense fish and mineral resources of the seas...Even now there is a simple but effective technique that could be used for increasing fish productivity: parts of the ocean could be fenced off electronically, and through this readily available electronic fencing, fish could be segregated by size. By preventing big fish from eating smaller fish, the production of fish could be increased enormously."

Mary Ruwart's Healing Our World states, "Owners would also be more likely to invest in artificial reefs to bolster the fish population. Whalers could operate only with the permission of the owners, much as hunters must request permission to stalk deer on privately owned land. Ocean owners profit most by making sure that the valuable species in their region are not hunted to extinction." Much as ownership of land also, under the common law, included ownership of all the airspace above him upward indefinitely unto the heavens and downward into the center of the Earth, and causing polluted air to enter another person's airspace would constitute aggression, causing polluted water to enter waters owned by another person would constitute aggression that would be legally treated as such, under an anarcho-capitalist system.

In 2009 George Mason University professor Peter T. Leeson has suggested that ocean privatization could help combat Somalian piracy. Ršgnvaldur Hannesson's book The Privatization of the Oceans argues that privatization will help alleviate the tragedy of the commons. Donald R. Leal's Let's Homestead the Oceans argues that regulation has failed and that individual transferable quotas, which guarantee each fisher a specific share of the total allowable catch before the season begins, should be established, or preferably, fullfledged property rights either to fishing areas or to the fish themselves should be created. The article argues that the more secure the property rights, the healthier fish populations and fishing communities will be. Some questions that arise in reference to water privatization are what areas are to be privatized exactly; how it can be ensured that the general public interest is not corrupted by private corporations acting alone or with government collusion to destroy these once-public resources; what would be a fair price to privatize oceanic tracts; how to hand over title to private firms to manage water resources; and how to manage any future transfers from one private institution to another.

== See also ==
- Common heritage of mankind
- Extraterrestrial real estate
- Free-market environmentalism
- Freedom of the seas
- International Seabed Authority
- International waters
- Land claim
- Seasteading
- Terra nullius
- Territorial claims in Antarctica
- Territorial waters
- United Nations Convention on the Law of the Sea
- Water privatization
