= John Davies =

John Davies may refer to:

== Academics ==
- John Davies (archivist) (1925–1999), Malaysian archivist
- John Davies (chemist) (died 1850), English chemist
- John Davies (classical scholar, born 1679) (1679–1732), English classical scholar, and president of Queens' College, Cambridge
- John Davies (historian) (1938–2015), Welsh historian
- John Davies (librarian) (1743–1817), librarian of the University of Cambridge
- John Gordon Davies (1919–1990), British theologian
- John K. Davies (astronomer) (born 1955), British astronomer
- John K. Davies (historian) (born 1937), British classical historian

== Businesspeople ==
- John Davies (British businessman) (1916–1979), businessman (British Petroleum) and Conservative MP and cabinet minister
- John Davies (New Zealand businessman) (born 1941), businessman and mayor of Queenstown
- John Davies (publisher) (1814–1872), co-founded the Australian newspaper The Mercury
- John Henry Davies (c. 1864 – 1927), brewery owner who in 1902 took over the British football club Manchester United
- John T. Davies (businessman) (1881–1938), British businessman, director of the Suez Canal Company, and the Ford Motor Company Limited
- John Wingett Davies (1908–1992), British cinema operator and director of Davies and Newman
- John Winsell Davies (born 1964), American owner of the Schramsberg Vineyards

== Film, radio, television, and theatre professionals ==
- John Davies (screenwriter) or Jack Davies (1913–1994), English screenwriter, producer and actor
- John Graham Davies (fl. 1983–2014), Canadian-British actor
- John Howard Davies (1939–2011), English television producer-director and former child actor

== Judges ==
- John Davies (judge) (1898–1969), Chief Justice of Tanganyika (now Tanzania)
- John Davies (swimmer) (1929–2020), United States district judge and Olympic swimmer for Australia

== Musicians ==
- John Davies (composer) (1787–1855), Welsh stonemason and composer
- John Elias Davies (1847–1883), Welsh harpist
- John Haydn Davies (1905–1991), Welsh schoolmaster and conductor
- John R. T. Davies (1927–2004), remastering engineer of classic jazz recordings and musician

== Politicians ==
=== Australasia ===
- John Davies (New South Wales politician) (1839–1896), Australian politician, NSW MLA (1874–87), MLC (1888–96)
- John Mark Davies (1840–1919), British-born Australian politician in the state of Victoria, MLC (1889–1919)
- John George Davies (1846–1913), Tasmanian politician, newspaper proprietor, and cricketer

=== United Kingdom ===
- John Davies (British businessman) (1916–1979), director-general of the Confederation of British Industry, Conservative MP, cabinet minister
- John Davies (poet, born 1569) (1569–1626), poet, statesman, attorney-general in Ireland
- John Davies (Welsh miners' agent) (died 1918), Welsh Liberal-Labour politician and trade unionist
- John Davies, 1st Baron Darwen (1885–1950), British cotton manufacturer and Labour politician
- John Cledwyn Davies (1869–1952), Welsh Liberal politician, educationist, and lawyer
- John Francis Davis (1795–1890), British diplomat, sinologist, and second Governor of Hong Kong
- John Lloyd Davies (1801–1860), Welsh lawyer and Conservative MP
- John Quentin Davies (1944–2025), British Labour MP
- John Davies (Plaid Cymru politician), Welsh Senedd member

=== United States ===
- John C. Davies (lawyer) (1857–1925), New York State Attorney General, 1899–1902
- John C. Davies II (1920–2002), US Representative from New York
- John Paton Davies Jr. (1908–1999), American diplomat
- John S. Davies (Pennsylvania politician) (1926–2010)
- John T. Davies (politician) (born 1932), Minnesota politician, former legislator and jurist

== Religious leaders ==
=== Anglican clergypeople ===
- John Davies (archbishop of Wales) (born 1953), Archbishop of Wales from 2017 to 2021 and Bishop of Swansea and Brecon from 2008 to 2021
- John Davies (archdeacon of Wrexham) (1908–1991), Welsh Anglican priest
- John Davies (priest, born 1795) (1795–1861), Welsh Anglican priest and philosopher
- John Davies (priest, born 1957), British Anglican priest and theologian
- John Davies (bishop of St Asaph) (born 1943), Bishop of St Asaph from 1999 to 2008
- John Davies (bishop of Shrewsbury) (1927–2026), Bishop of Shrewsbury from 1987 to 1994
- John David Davies (1831–1911), Welsh priest
- John Llewelyn Davies (1826–1916), English preacher and theologian
- John Rhys Davies (priest) (1890–1953), Anglican priest in Wales
- John Thomas Davies (priest) (1881–1966), Anglican priest in Wales

=== Methodist ministers and missionaries ===
- John Davies (Methodist minister, born 1823) (1823–1874), Welsh Methodist minister
- John Davies (missionary) (1772–1855), Welsh missionary and school teacher
- John Davies of Nercwys (1799–1879), Welsh Calvinistic Methodist minister, preacher and writer
- John Cadvan Davies (1846–1923), Welsh poet and Wesleyan Methodist minister
- John Evan Davies (1850–1929), Welsh Calvinistic Methodist minister
- John Gwynoro Davies (1855–1935), Welsh Methodist minister

=== Other religious leaders ===
- John Davies (Congregationalist minister, born 1804) (1804–1884), Welsh Congregationalist minister
- John Davies (Unitarian minister, born 1795) (1795–1858), Welsh Unitarian minister and schoolmaster
- John Ossian Davies (1851–1916), Welsh Congregationalist minister
- John Park Davies (1879–1937), Welsh Unitarian minister

== Sportspeople ==
=== Association footballers and football trainers ===
- John Davies (footballer, born 1856) (1856–1929), Wrexham A.F.C. and Wales international footballer
- John Davies (footballer, born 1881), English footballer with Liverpool and Blackpool
- John Davies (footballer, born 1933), footballer with Portsmouth, Scunthorpe United and Walsall
- John Davies (footballer, born 1959), Welsh footballer with Cardiff City and Hull City
- John Davies (footballer, born 1966), Scottish footballer with Clydebank, St. Johnstone, Airdrieonians, Ayr United and Motherwell
- John Davies (goalkeeper) (fl. 1889–1893), with Burslem Port Vale F.C. and Newton Heath F.C.
- John Edward Davies (1862–1912), Oswestry F.C. and Wales international footballer
- John Henry Davies (football trainer) or Jack Davies (fl. 1920–1978), British football trainer
- John Price Davies (1862–1955), Druids F.C. and Wales international footballer

=== Rugby players ===
- John Davies (rugby union, born 1897) (1897–1929), Welsh international rugby union
- John Davies (rugby, born 1941) (1941–1969), rugby union and rugby league footballer of the 1960s for Wales (RU), Neath, and Leeds (RL)
- John Davies (rugby league, born 1991), current rugby league footballer for Castleford Tigers
- John Davies (rugby union, born 1969), rugby union footballer of the 1990s and 2000s for Wales, Llanelli, and (Llanelli) Scarlets
- John Leighton Davies (1927–1995), former rugby union and professional rugby league footballer

=== Swimmers ===
- John Davies (swimmer) (1929–2020), Olympic swimmer for Australia and later United States district judge
- John Cecil Wright Davies or Jack Davies (1916–1997), New Zealand swimmer
- John Goldup Davies (1914–1989), English swimmer

=== Other sportspeople ===
- John Davies (Australian footballer) (1943–86), Australian rules footballer for Geelong
- John Davies (bowls) (fl. 1988), New Zealand Paralympic lawn bowler
- John Davies (English cricketer) (1932–2024)
- John Davies (ice hockey) (1928–2009), Canadian ice hockey player with the Edmonton Mercurys
- John Davies (runner) (1938–2003), New Zealand middle-distance runner
- John Davies (runner, born 1949), English middle-distance runner
- John Davies (steeplechase runner) (born 1952), Welsh runner
- John Davies (Welsh cricketer) (1926–2005)
- John William Matthew Davies or Johnny Davies (1900–1967), Australian rules footballer for Carlton and Fitzroy
- John Davies (shot putter) (born c. 1941), Welsh shot putter

== Other writers ==
- John Davies (grammarian) or Siôn Dafydd Rhys (1534 – c. 1609), Welsh physician and grammarian
- John Davies of Hereford (c. 1565 – 1618), Anglo-Welsh poet and satirist
- John Davies (Mallwyd) (c. 1567 – 1644), lexicographer, translator, and editor of the 1620 Welsh edition of the Bible
- John Davies (poet, born 1569) (1569–1626), English poet, lawyer and politician
- John Davies (translator) (1625–1693), Welsh translator and writer
- John Davies (Taliesin Hiraethog) (1841–1894), Welsh poet
- John Cadvan Davies (1846–1923), Welsh poet and Wesleyan Methodist minister
- John Davies (poet, born 1944), Welsh poet
- John Daniel Davies (1874–1948), Welsh editor and author
- John Davies (author) (1868–1940), Welsh author
- John Davies (bard) (died 1694), Welsh bard
- John Davies (bibliographer and genealogist) (1860–1939), Welsh bibliographer and genealogist
- John Davies (printer and journalist) (1832–1904), Welsh printer, editor, journalist, and songwriter

== Others ==
- John Davies (architect) (1796–1865), English architect
- John Davies (photographer) (born 1949), landscape photographer based in the United Kingdom
- John Humphreys Davies (1871–1926), Welsh lawyer, bibliographer and educator
- John Thomas Davies (1895–1955), English recipient of the Victoria Cross
- John Vipond Davies (1862–1939), Welsh civil engineer

== See also ==
- Jon Davie (born 1954), folk guitarist
- Jonathan Davies (disambiguation)
- Jonathan Davis (disambiguation)
- John G. Davies (disambiguation)
- John Davis (disambiguation)
- John Davys (disambiguation)
- John Davey (disambiguation)
- John Davy (disambiguation)
- Jack Davies (disambiguation)
- John Davies Gilbert (1811–1854), land owner
- John Rhys-Davies (born 1944), Welsh actor
- John Langdon-Davies (1897–1971), British author and journalist
