= John G. Davies (disambiguation) =

John G. Davies (1929–2020) was an Australian-American swimmer and US federal judge.

John G. Davies may also refer to:

- John George Davies (1846–1913), Tasmanian politician, newspaper proprietor, and cricketer
- John Gerwyn Davies (born 1959), Welsh footballer
- John Goldup Davies (1914–1989), English swimmer
- John Gordon Davies (1919–1990), British theologian
- John Gwynoro Davies (1855–1935), Welsh Methodist minister

== See also ==
- John Davies (disambiguation)
