= Ouwehand =

Ouwehand is a Dutch surname. It translates to "old hand", but is thought to derive from Ouwehan ("Han Sr."), akin to Ouwejans ("John Sr.") and Jongejans ("John Jr."), or have been a misreading of Ouweland ("old land"). People with the surname include:

- Cornelis Ouwehand, (1920–1996), Dutch anthropologist
- Cornelis Willem "Cor" Ouwehand (1892–1951), Dutch entrepreneur and founder of the
  - Ouwehands Dierenpark, a zoo in Rhenen.
- Esther Ouwehand, (born 1976), Dutch politician
- Willem H. Ouwehand, (born 1953), Dutch hematologist
