= Jack Davies =

Jack Davies may refer to:

- Jack Davies (screenwriter) (1913–1994), English screenwriter, producer, editor and actor
- Jack Llewelyn Davies (1894–1959), one of the inspirations for the boy characters in Peter Pan
- Jack Davies (rugby), Welsh rugby union and rugby league footballer who played in the 1940s, 1950s and 1960s
- Jack Davies (football trainer), British football trainer
- Jack Davies (swimmer) (1916–1997), New Zealand swimmer
- Jack Davies (cricketer, born 1911) (1911–1992), English psychologist and sportsman
- Jack Davies (cricketer, born 2000), English cricketer
- Jack Davies (footballer, born 2002), English footballer for MK Dons
- Jack Davies (rugby league Australia), Australian rugby league footballer who played in the 1920s and 1930s
- Jack Davies (footballer, born 1902) (1902–1985), English footballer
- Jack Davies (1933–2026), birth name of actor and singer Michael Preston

== See also ==
- Jack Davis (disambiguation)
- John Davies (disambiguation)
