= John Davie (disambiguation) =

John Davie (1640–1710) was an English merchant from Bideford, Devon.

John Davie may also refer to:

- Sir John Davie, 1st Baronet (1588–1654), MP for Tiverton 1621–1622
- Sir John Davie, 2nd Baronet (1612–1678), MP for Tavistock 1661
- Sir John Davie, 3rd Baronet (1660–1692) MP for Saltash 1679–1685, of the Davie baronets
- Sir John Davie, 5th Baronet (died 1727), of the Davie baronets
- Sir John Davie, 6th Baronet (1700–1737), of the Davie baronets
- Sir John Davie, 7th Baronet (1734–1792), of the Davie baronets
- Sir John Davie, 8th Baronet (1772–1803), of the Davie baronets
- Sir John Davie, 9th Baronet (1798–1824), of the Davie baronets
- John Davie (Master of Sidney Sussex College, Cambridge) (1777–1813), Master of Sidney Sussex 1811–1813
- John Davie (activist) (1800–1891), Scottish draper and social reformer
- John Ferguson Davie (1830–1907), British politician, and British Army officer
- Jock Davie (1913–1994), Scottish footballer
- John Davie (British Army officer) (1921–2015)
- John S. Davie (1862–1955), Scots-born sculptor and teacher in Australia

== See also ==
- Jon Davie (born 1954), guitarist
- John Davy (disambiguation)
- John Davey (disambiguation)
- John Davies (disambiguation)
- Davie (disambiguation)
