= John Davey =

John Davey may refer to:

- John Davey (swimmer) (born 1964), former British Olympic swimmer
- John Davey (tree surgeon) (1846–1923), considered the father of tree surgery
- John Davey (Cornish speaker) (1812–1891), Cornish farmer
- John Davey (cricketer) (1847–1878), English cricketer
- John Ryan Davey (1913–1992), Australian cricketer
- John Richard Davey (1957–2021), Australian cricketer
- John Davey (actor), American actor, best known for portraying Captain Marvel on the 1970s TV series Shazam!
- John Davey (master) (1732–1798), Master of Balliol College, Oxford
- Jack Davey (1907–1959), radio personality
- Jack Davey (cricketer) (born 1944), former English cricketer
- Gerry Davey (John Gerald Davey, 1914–1977), British ice hockey player

== See also ==
- John Davy (disambiguation)
- John Davie (disambiguation)
- John Davys (disambiguation)
- John Davis (disambiguation)
- John Davies (disambiguation)
