= John Davy =

John Davy may refer to:

- John Davy (chemist) (1790–1868), British chemist and younger brother of Sir Humphy Davy
- John Davy (cricketer) (born 1974), Irish cricketer
- John Davy (composer) (1763–1824), English composer
- John M. Davy (1835–1909), U.S. Representative from New York
- John Davy (Blessed), English Carthusian monk executed during the English Reformation
- John Davey (Cornish speaker) of Zennor (1812–1891), Cornwall; considered to be one of the last people to have traditional knowledge of the Cornish language
- John Davy (MP), MP for Dorchester
- John Davy (journalist) (1927–1984), British journalist and science editor

== See also ==
- Jonny Davy, death metal musician
- John Davie (disambiguation)
- John Davey (disambiguation)
- John Davy Hayward (1905–1965), English writer
- John Davys (disambiguation)
- John Davis (disambiguation)
- John Davies (disambiguation)
