= John Davys =

John Davys may refer to:

- John Davis (explorer) (1550–1605)
- John Davys (died 1689) (1646–1689), Irish politician
- John Davys (died 1743), Irish MP for Coleraine, Kildare, Charlemont and Carrickfergus

== See also ==
- John Davis (disambiguation)
- John Davies (disambiguation)
- John Davey (disambiguation)
- John Davy (disambiguation)
