= Schramsberg Vineyards =

Winery in Calistoga, California, U.S.

Coordinates: 38.550641°N 122.539648°W

- Location: Calistoga, California, USA
- Appellation: Napa Valley
- Other labels: J. Davies
- Founded: 1862 by Jacob Schram; 1965 reopened by Jack and Jamie Davies
- Key people: Hugh Davies (CEO)
- Known for: California sparkling wine
- Distribution: International
- Tasting: Open to the public
- Website: www.schramsberg.com

U.S. National Register of Historic Places
- Designated: 1998
- Reference no.: 98001251

California Historical Landmark
- Designated: 1956
- Reference no.: 561

Schramsberg Vineyards is a winery located in Calistoga, California, in the Napa Valley region. The vineyard, which was founded in 1862 by the German immigrant Jacob Schram, produces a series of sparkling wines using the same method as champagne. Schramsberg is considered one of the premium brands in the production of sparkling wine in California and the first U.S. wine to "match the style and quality of the best French Champagnes".

After nearly 50 years of inactivity, Schramsberg was acquired by Jack and Jamie Davies in 1965 who began producing champagne method wine. Today, Schramsberg is managed by Hugh Davies, the youngest son of Jack and Jamie Davies.

== History ==
=== Early history (1862–1905) ===
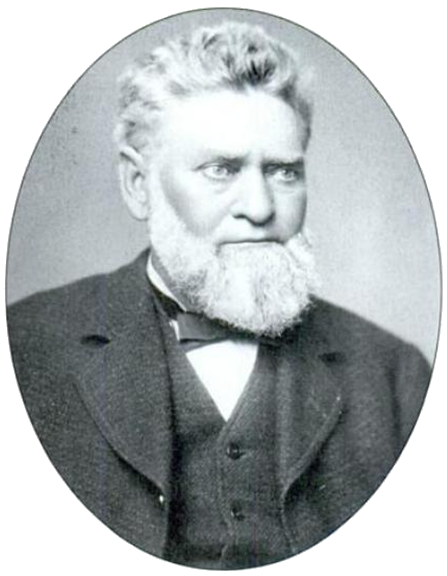
Jacob Schram, the founder of Schramsberg in 1862

In 1862, Jacob Schram purchased what would later become Schramsberg in the hills of Napa Valley with the intention of producing wine. Although Schram was born into a winemaking family, he made his living as a barber. Schram was one of a small group of early winemakers to arrive in Napa in the middle of the 19th century. Schram was born in 1826 in Pfeddersheim, Germany and came to the U.S. in 1852. Schram married Annie Weaver, also of German descent in 1859.

After clearing the property, the couple began planting a variety of grapes to produce wine. In the 1870s, Schram dug cellars into hills on the property and by 1876 Schramsberg was producing 12,000 gallons. Within a few years, Schramsberg had expanded to over 50 acres (20 ha) and was producing 12,000 cases each year.

Schramsberg gained significant attention in the 1880s when it was featured in Robert Louis Stevenson's book The Silverado Squatters. Stevenson, accompanied by his new bride Fanny Vandegrift and her 12-year-old son from a previous marriage, Lloyd Osbourne, spent the late spring and early summer of 1880 honeymooning in the Napa Valley. In the book, Stevenson documented his ventures in the area and profiled several of the early pioneers who played a role in shaping the region's commerce and society. He relates that while visiting Schramsberg, he tasted eighteen different wines. Stevenson writes:

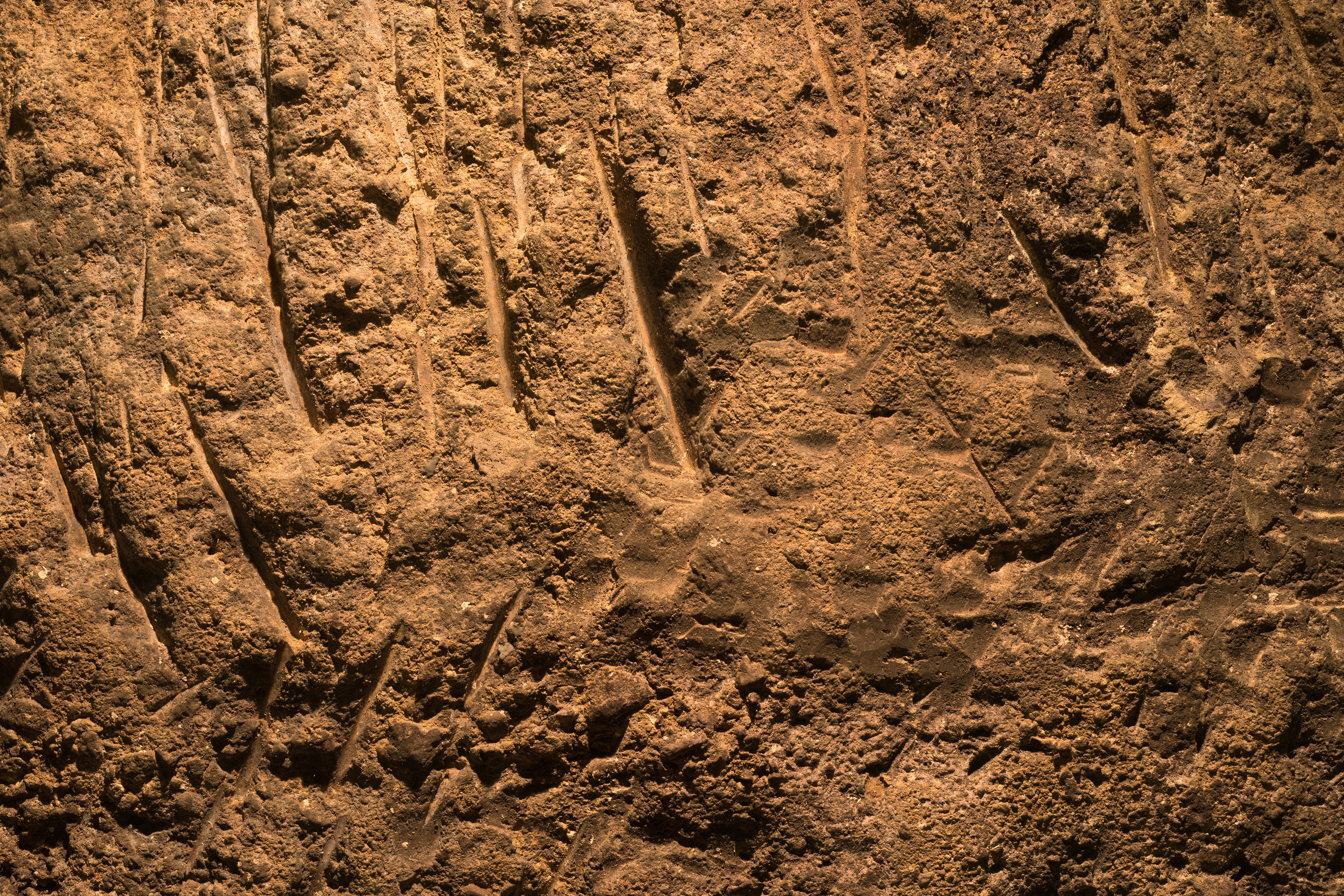
Scratch marks of picks used by Chinese workers during the construction of Schramsberg's wine cellar

I was interested in California wine. Indeed, I am interested in all wines and have been all my life, from the raisin wine that a school-fellow kept secreted in his play-box up to my last discovery, those notable Valtellines that once shone upon the board of Caesar ... A California vineyard, one of man's outposts in the wilderness, has features of its own. There is nothing here to remind you of the Rhine or Rhone, of the low cote d'or or the infamous and scabby deserts of Champagne; but all is green, solitary, covert. We visited two of them, Mr. Schram's and Mr. McEachran's, sharing the same glen ...

Schramsberg continued to prosper through the end of the 19th century. Annie Schram died in the summer of 1901 after falling ill the previous autumn. Jacob Schram died four years later in 1905, leaving the property and the winemaking business to his son Herman Schram.

=== Decline of Schramsberg (1905–1965) ===
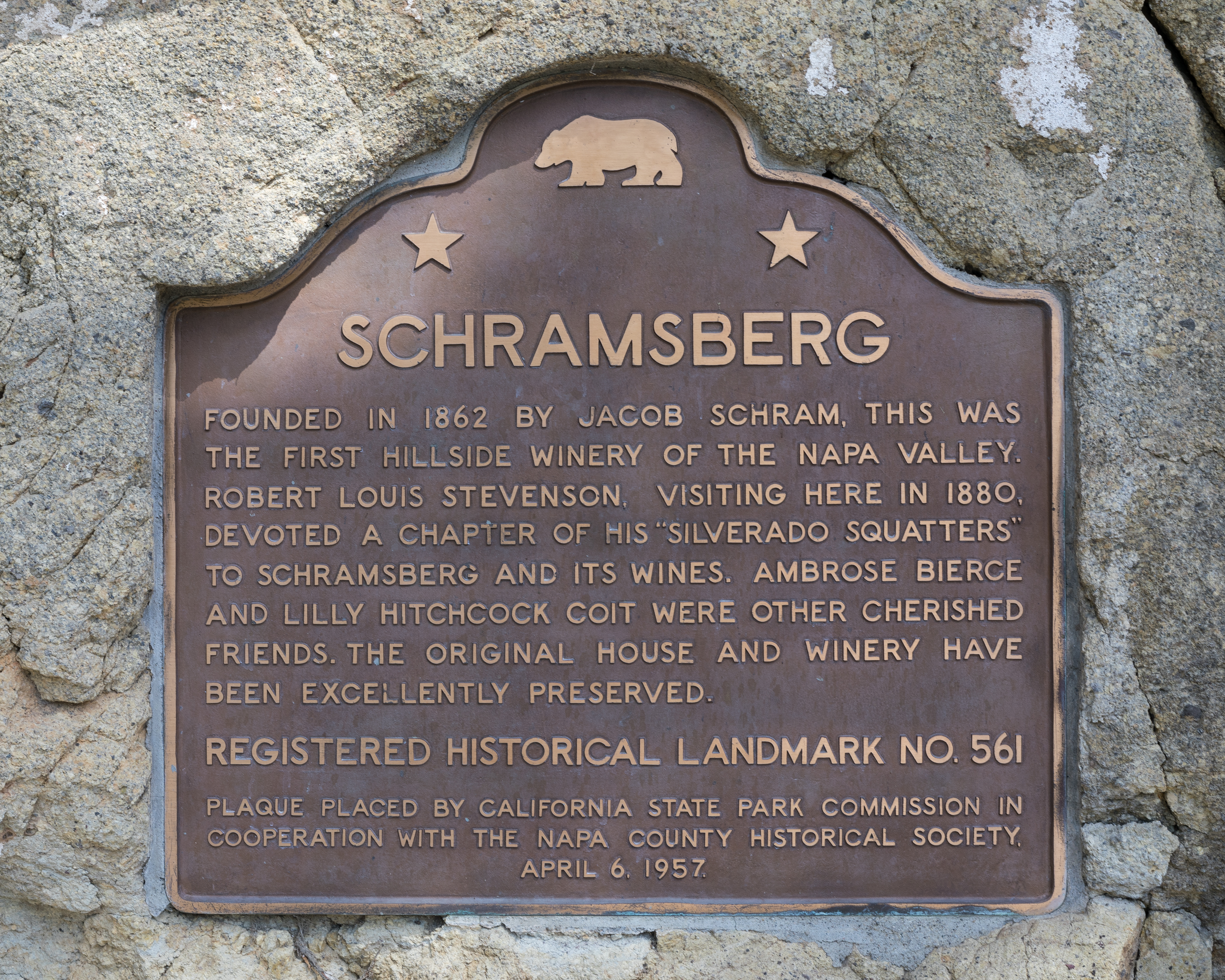
Schramsberg was declared a Historical Landmark in 1957.

Herman attempted to continue the business but sold the property to the Sterling Investment Company after just a few years. In 1916, the property was sold again to W. J. McKillop. Instead of producing wine, McKillop, a wealthy San Francisco businessman, used the Schramsberg as a summer home. After McKillop, the property changed hands several times over the next four decades and none of the owners used the property as a vineyard. Schramsberg was sold to Captain Raymond C. Naylor and then to John Gargano in 1940.

In 1951, Schramsberg was sold again, this time to Douglas Pringle. Aided by the lobbying efforts of Pringle's wife, Katharine Cebrian, the winery was named a state historical landmark on December 31, 1956. Following the Pringles' divorce in 1959 the property was not used for a number of years.

=== Restoration under the Davies (1965–present) ===
After years of neglect, Schramsberg was sold to Jack and Jamie Davies in 1965. The couple had spent a year looking for a property in the Napa Valley to produce wine. At the time of their purchase, Schramsberg was run-down and the property had been abandoned for years.

Rather than produce the typical varietals of wine found in Napa at that time, the Davies determined to produce sparkling wine in the same Champagne method as was used in France.

In 1972, Schramsberg's 1969 vintage "Blanc de Blancs" (white of whites) was served at the "Toast to Peace" in Beijing, between Richard Nixon and Zhou Enlai. Since that time, Schramsberg's wines have been served by every subsequent presidential administration.

Schramsberg earned numerous awards over the years. In 1995, Schramsberg was awarded a Lifetime Achievement Award by the International Festival of Méthode Champenoise and in 1996 the James Beard Foundation awarded Schramsberg the Wine and Spirits Professional Award for "making a significant impact in the wine and spirits industry."

In 1996, Hugh Davies, the youngest son of Jack and Jamie Davies joined the winery full-time. Hugh had earned a master's degree in enology from the University of California, Davis. Hugh was born in 1965, the year that the Davies family purchased the Schramsberg property. The winery was then added to the National Register of Historic Places in 1998.

Jack Davies died in the spring of 1998 and in 2008, Jamie Davies also died. Today, Hugh Davies is CEO. John Winsell Davies, one of three Davies sons, contested his family's trust agreement, which left him no share of the winery.

== Gallery ==
Schramsberg Vineyards
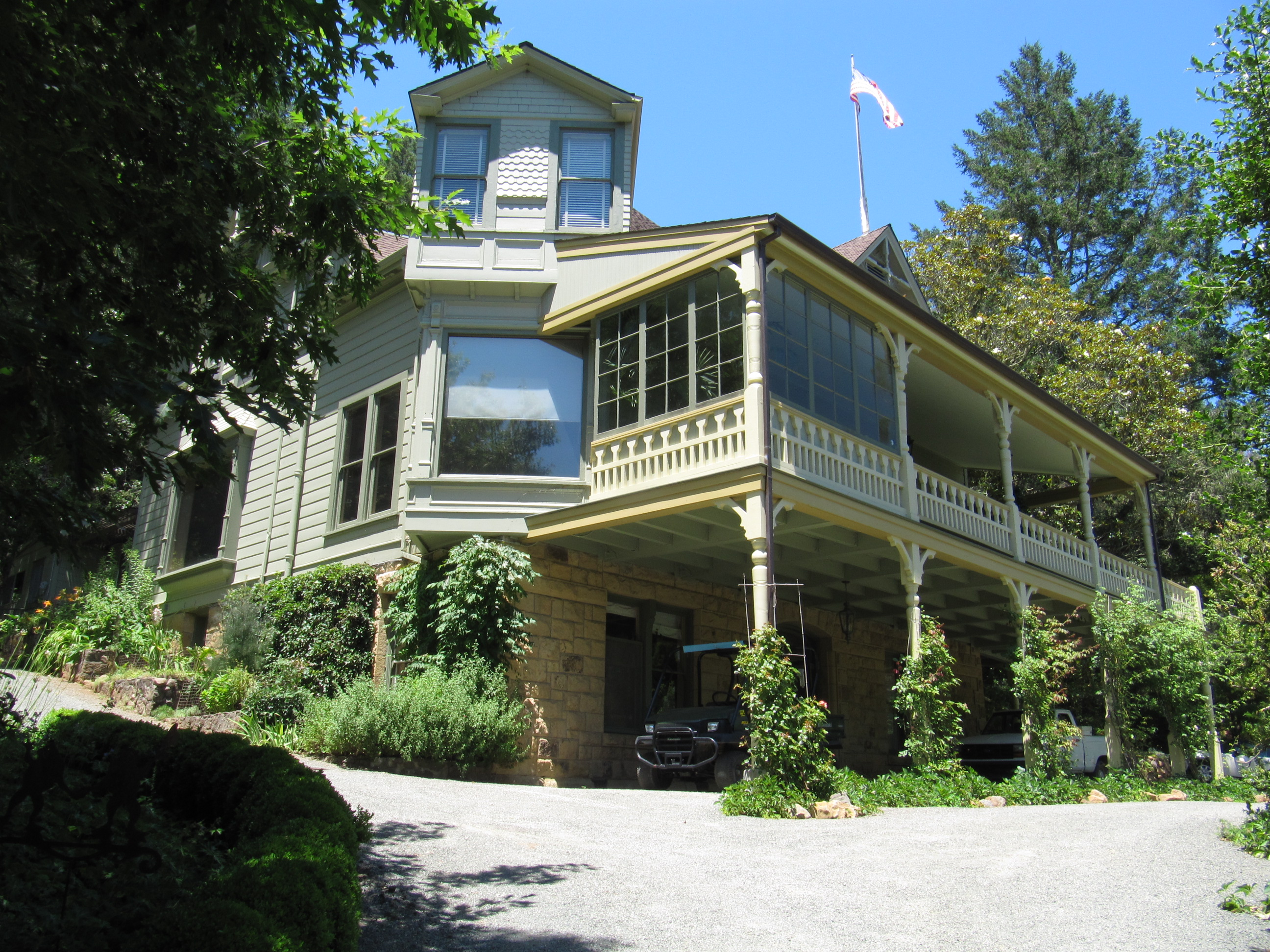
The main house at Schramsberg

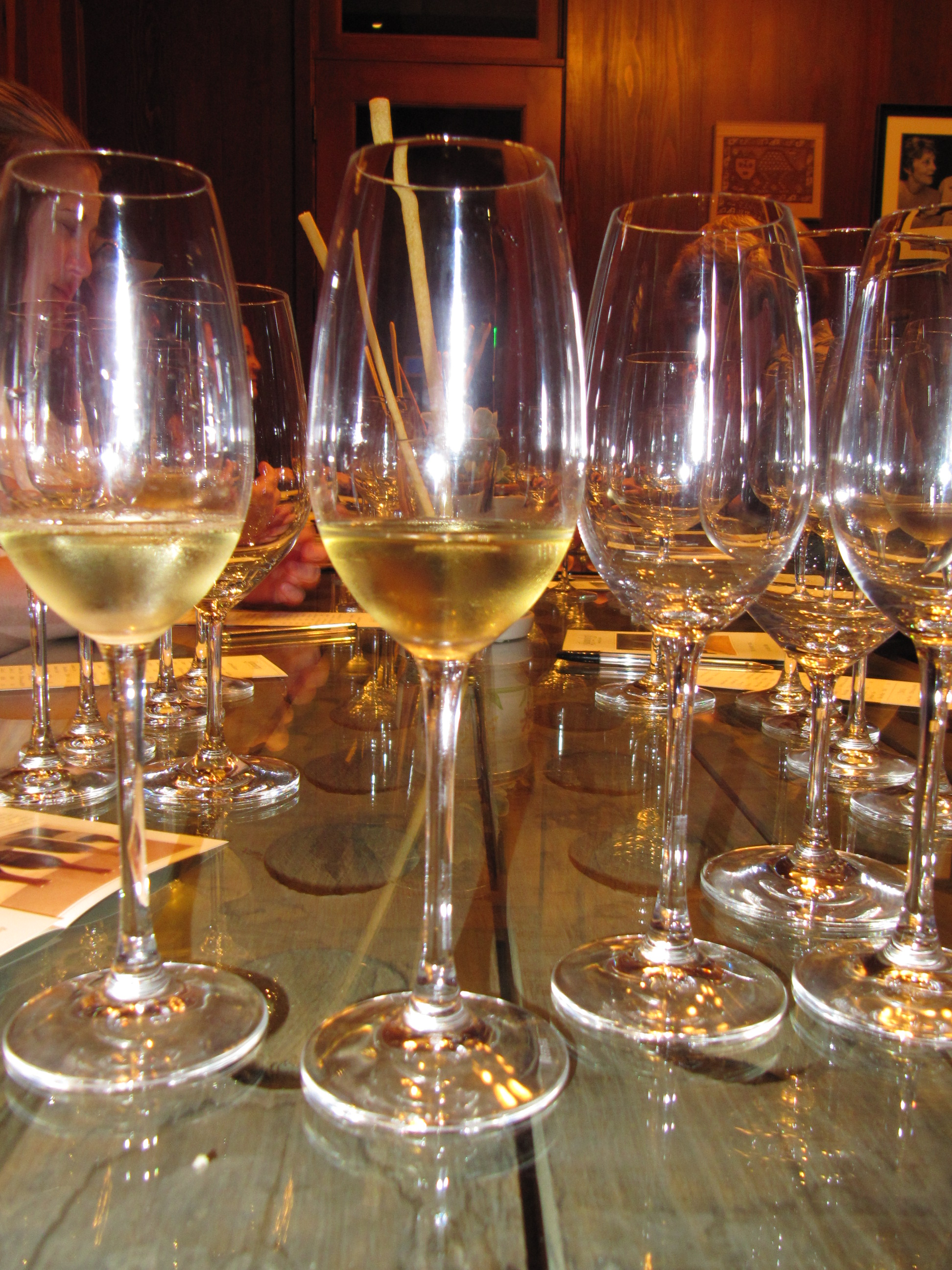
A wine tasting at Schramsberg

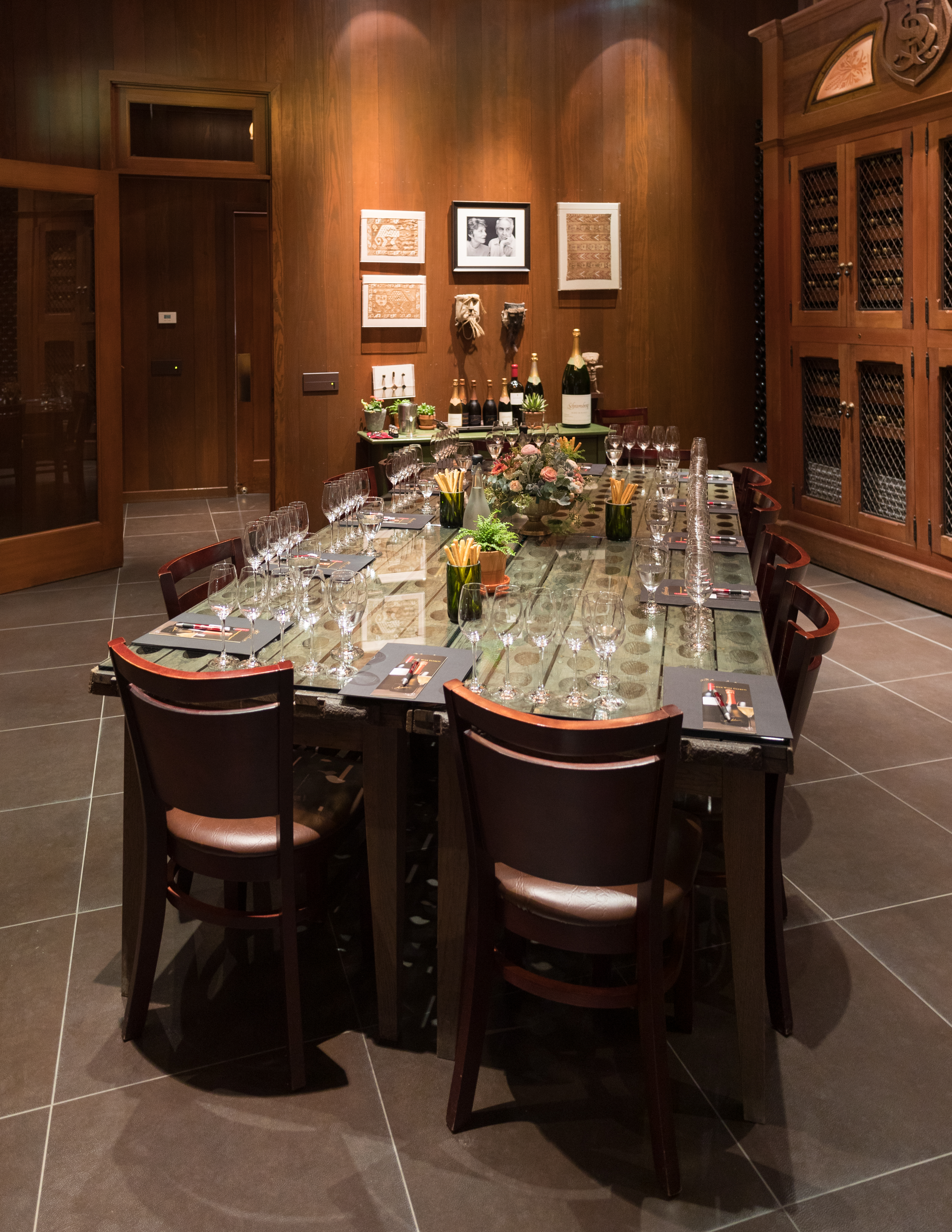
Tasting room at Schramsberg

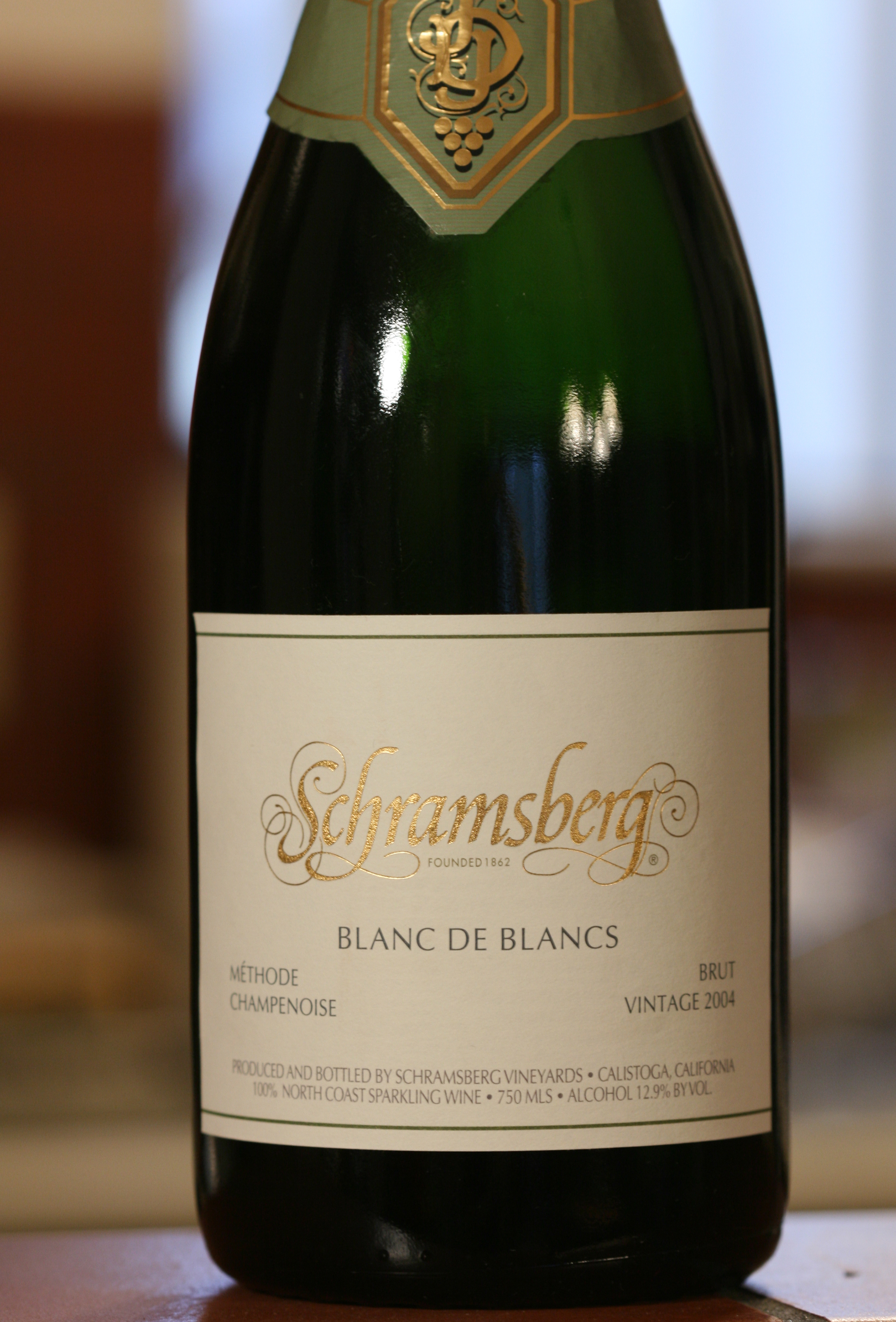
Schramsberg's "Blanc de Blancs" sparkling wine was served during the "1972 U.S./China Toast to Peace".

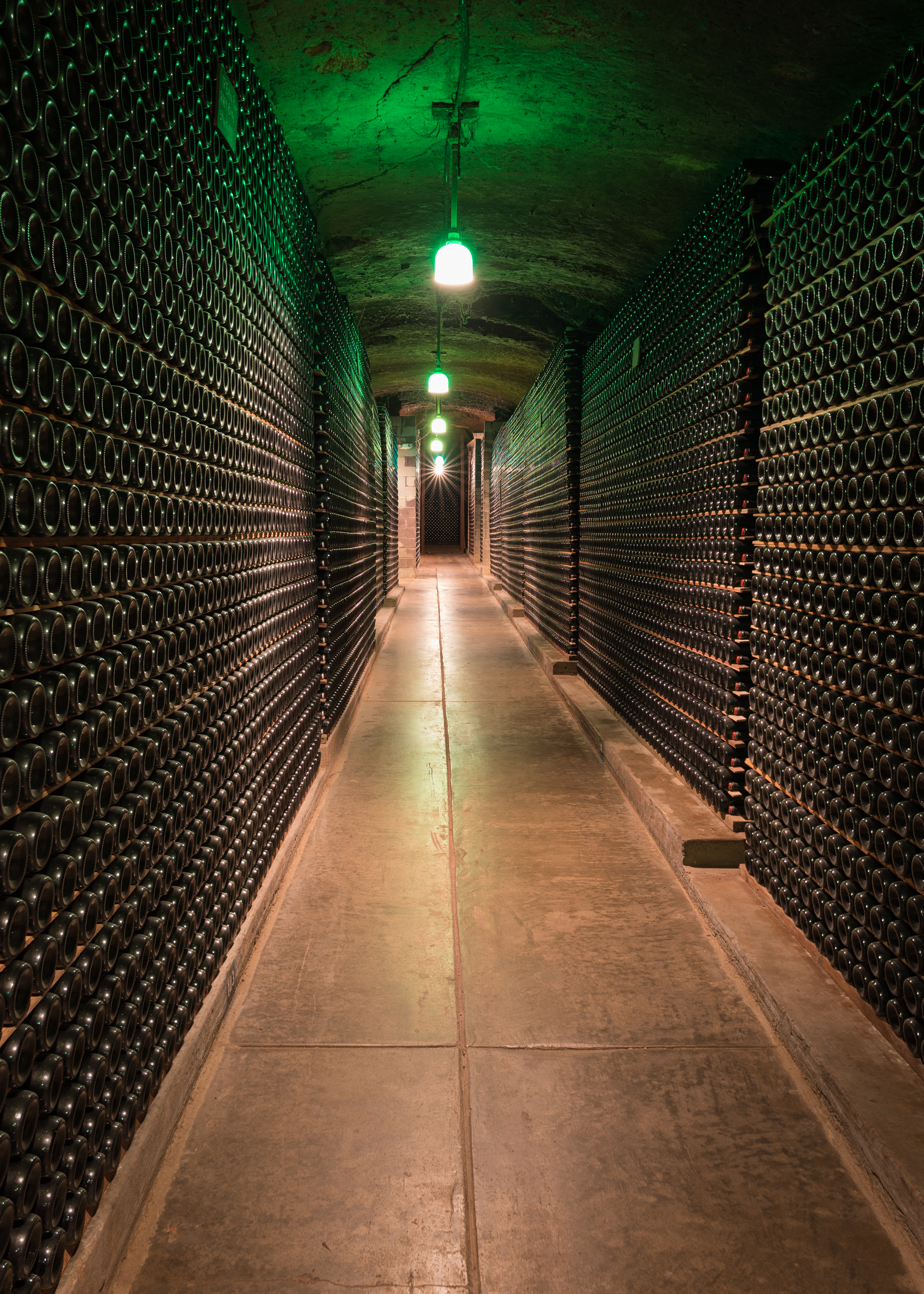
Schramsberg wine cellars (entrance)

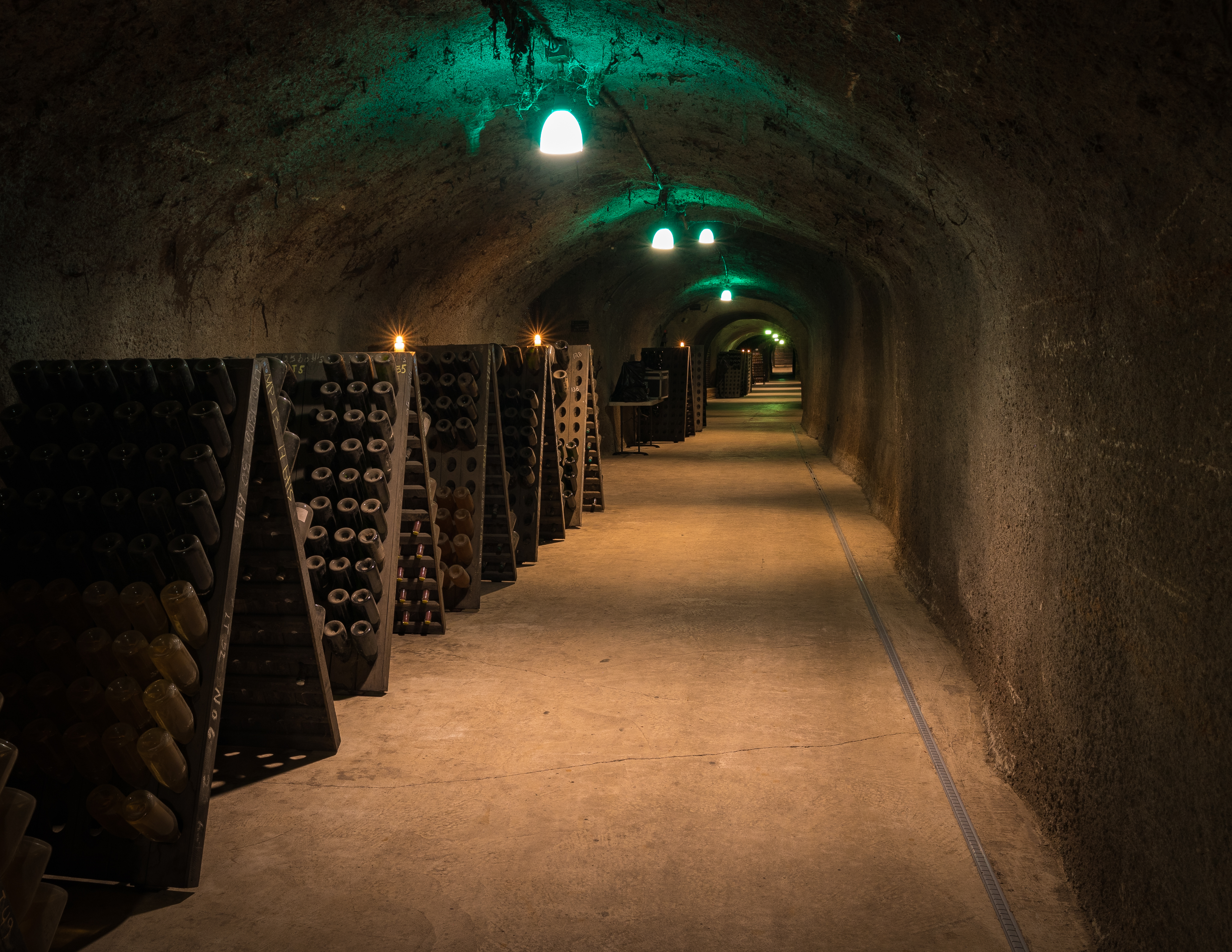
Schramsberg wine cellars

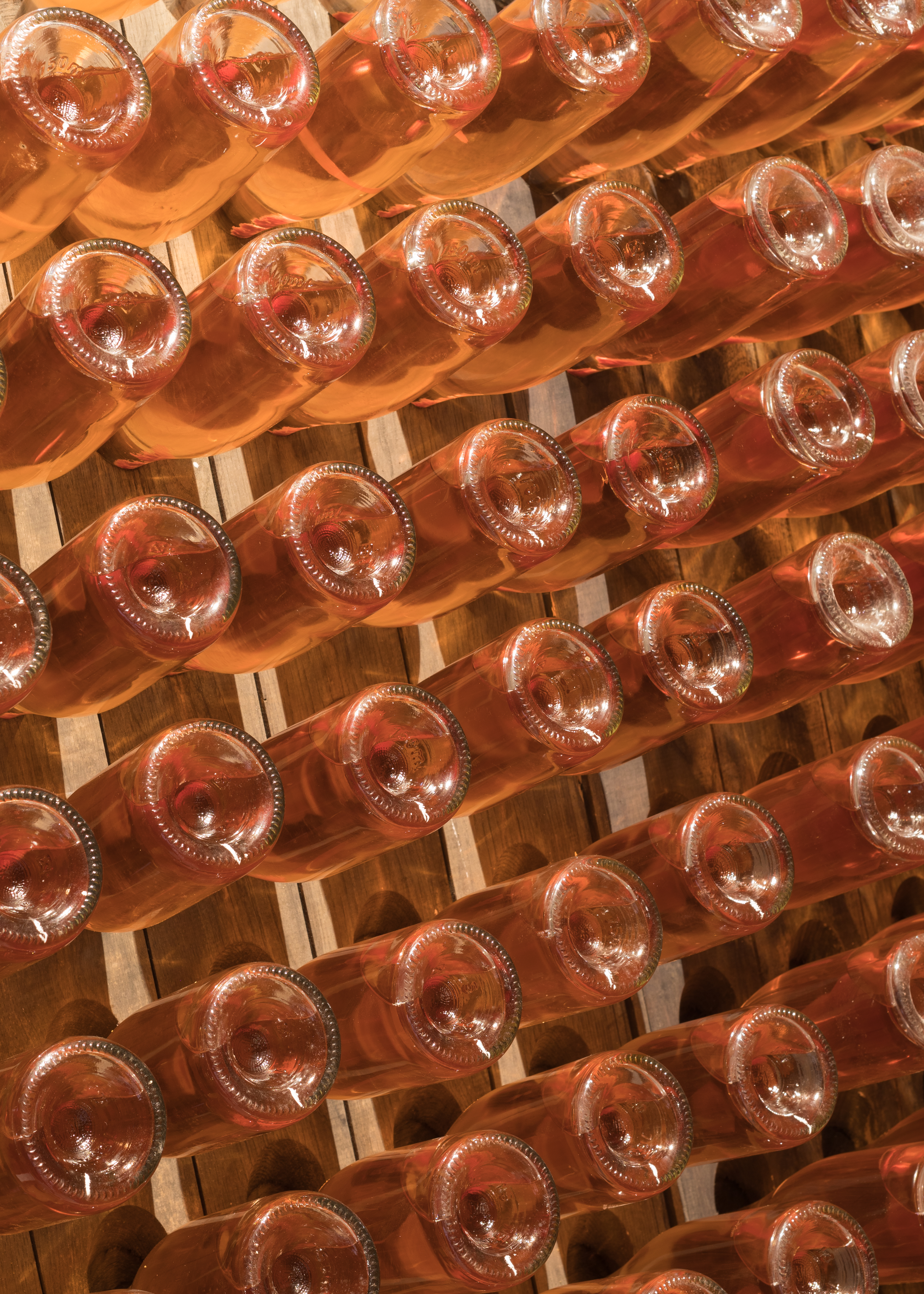
Bottles during sparkling wine production

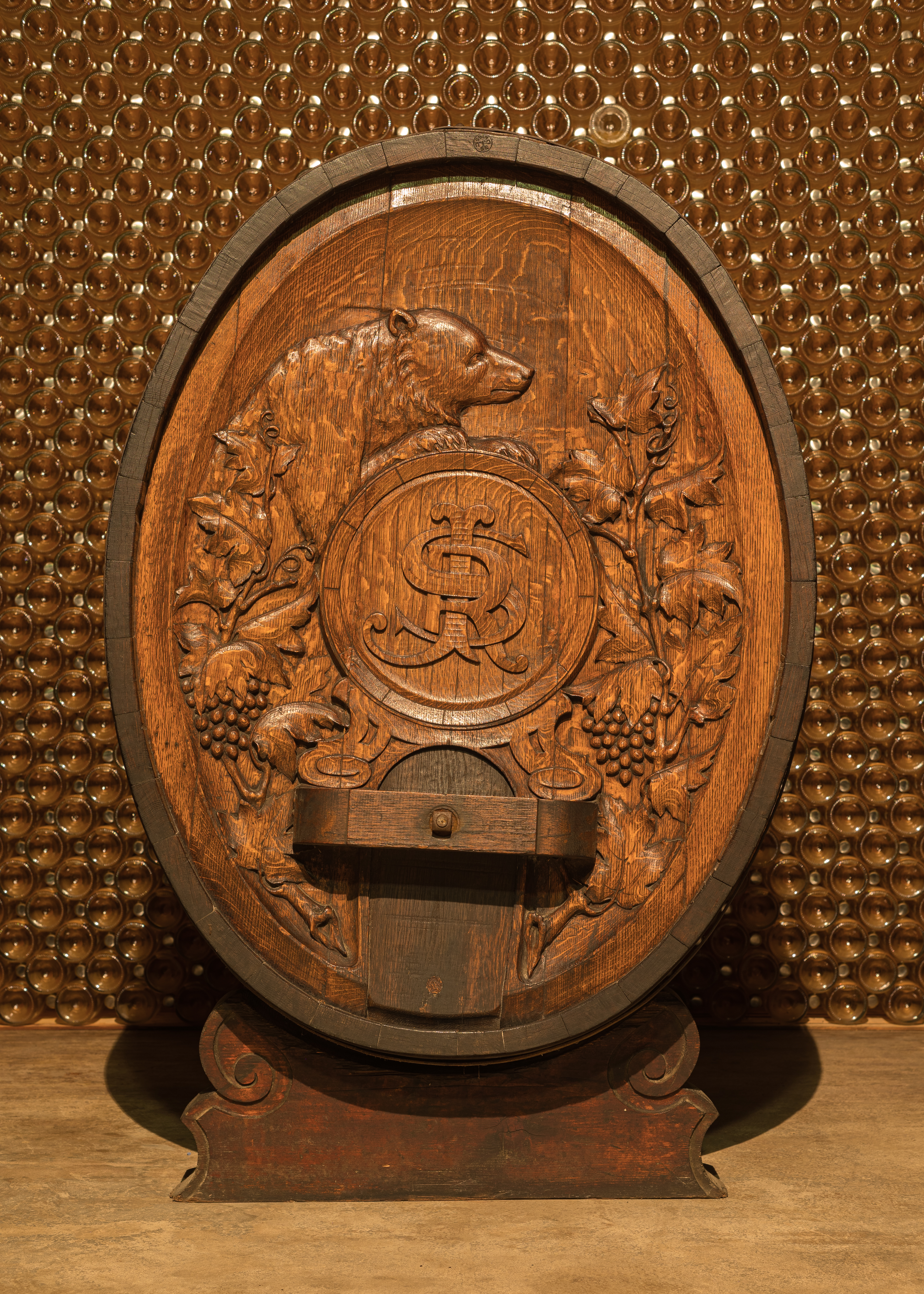
Old barrel in the wine cellars

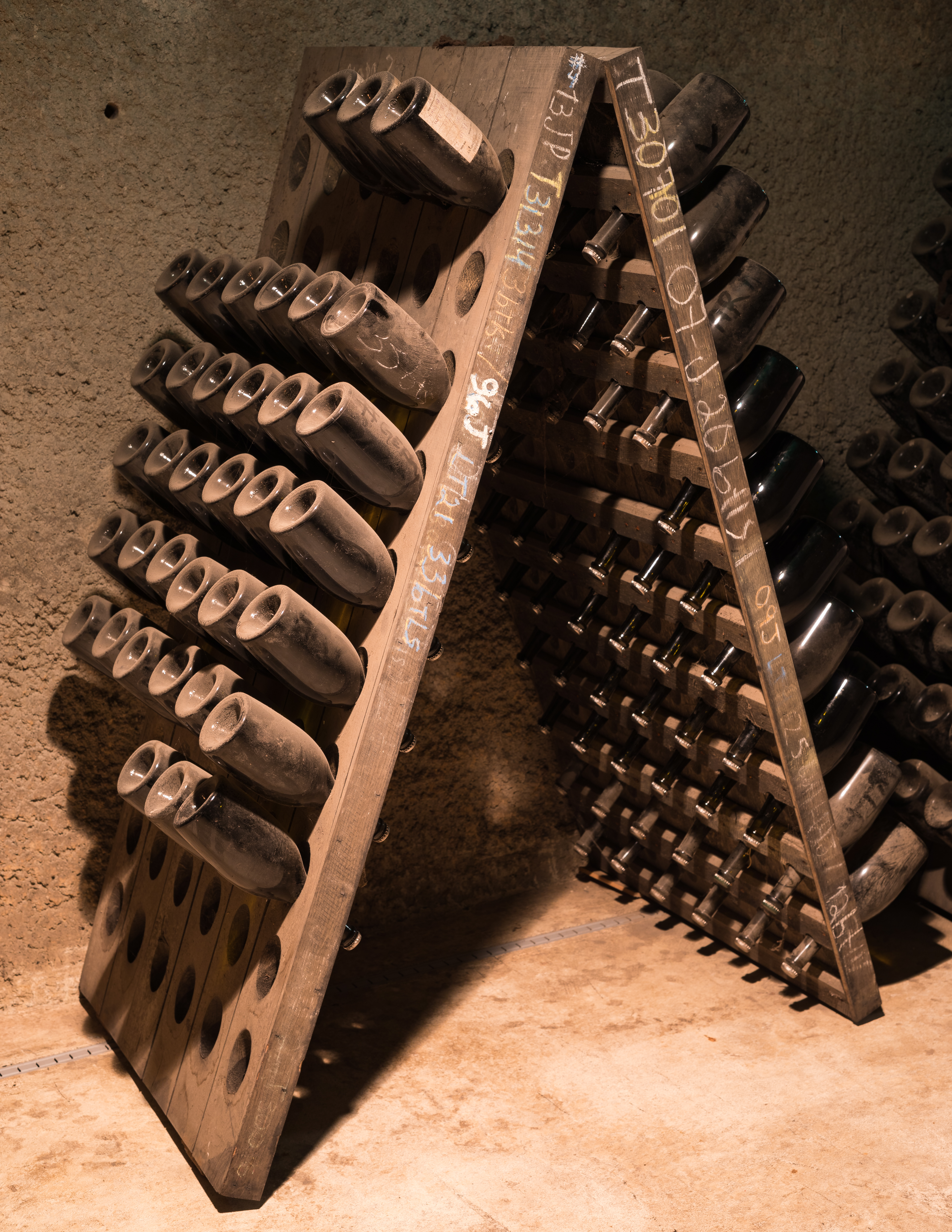
Old bottles in the wine cellar

== See also ==
- John Winsell Davies, son of Jack and Jamie Davies
