= Sally Davies (doctor) =

British physician and academic (born 1949)

Dame Sally Davies GCB DBE FRS FMedSci
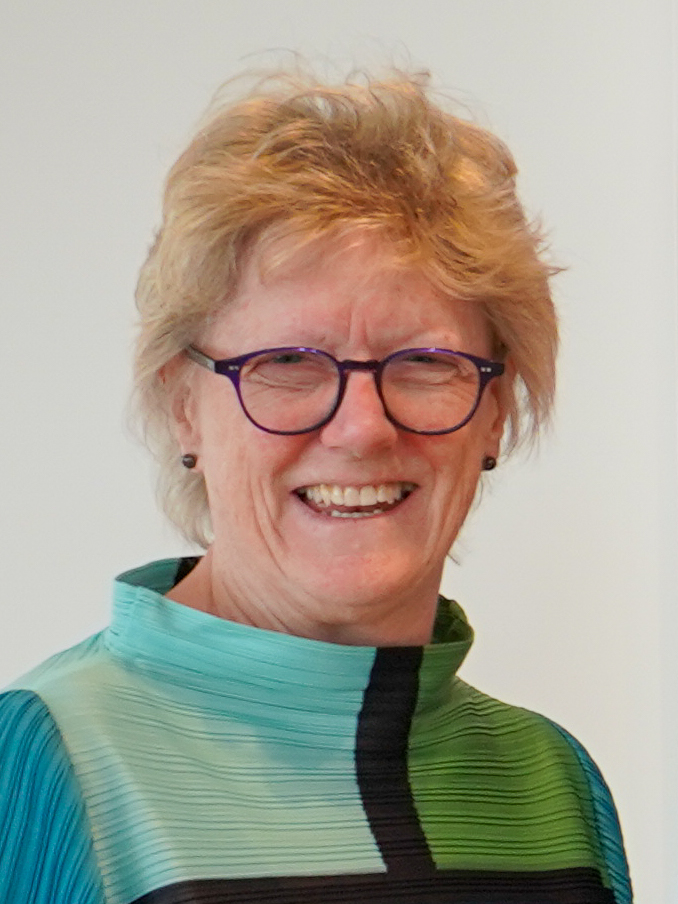
- Davies in 2024

Master of Trinity College, Cambridge
- In office 8 October 2019 – 2026
- Preceded by: Sir Gregory Winter
- Succeeded by: Sir David Baulcombe

Chief Medical Officer for England
- In office 1 June 2010 – 1 October 2019
- Preceded by: Sir Liam Donaldson
- Succeeded by: Chris Whitty

Personal details
- Born: Sally Claire Davies; 24 November 1949 (age 76) Birmingham, England
- Spouses: Ralph Skilbeck (m. 1972; div. 1982) P. R. A. Vulliamy (m. 1982; died 1982) Willem H. Ouwehand (m. 1989)
- Children: 2
- Parent: John Gordon Davies (father)
- Education: University of Manchester; University of London
- Occupation: Master, Trinity College Cambridge
- Profession: Physician (haematologist)
- Awards: Cameron Prize of the University of Edinburgh (2017); Suffrage Science award (2011)
- Website: gov.uk/government/people/sally-davies

Dame Sally Claire Davies (born 24 November 1949) is a British physician. She was the Chief Medical Officer from 2010 to 2019 and Chief Scientific Adviser at the Department of Health from 2004 to 2016. She worked as a clinician specialising in the treatment of diseases of the blood and bone marrow. She is now Master of Trinity College, Cambridge, appointed on 8 February 2019, with effect from 8 October 2019. She is one of the founders of the National Institute for Health and Care Research.

== Early life and education ==
Davies was born on 24 November 1949 in Birmingham, England. Her father John Gordon Davies was an Anglican priest and theologian, and her mother Emily Mary Tordoff was a scientist: they both became academics at the University of Birmingham. She failed her eleven-plus exam but was nevertheless able to study at the private Edgbaston High School for Girls in Birmingham, where she excelled on the viola.

Davies studied medicine at Manchester Medical School at the University of Manchester where she graduated with a Bachelor of Medicine, Bachelor of Surgery (MB ChB) degree in 1972 and later obtained a Master of Science (MSc) degree from the University of London.

== Career and research ==
Davies described her early years in clinical practice as "brutalising" and had a four-year break from medicine as a "diplomat's wife" in Madrid, before returning to medical training at the end of the 1970s.

She became a consultant haematologist in 1985 at the Central Middlesex Hospital in Brent – a relatively deprived part of northwest London – and became Professor of Haemoglobinopathies there in 1997, by which time the hospital had been incorporated into Imperial College London.

Davies is an expert in sickle cell disease: a blood disorder that mainly affects people of African heritage and causes painful 'crises' triggered by physical stress.

As well as a number of academic works, Davies is the author of the book The Drugs Don't Work: A Global Threat (2013).

=== Civil Service ===
Davies joined the Civil Service in 2004 to take up a research position in London and was soon promoted to Director-General of Research and Development at the Department of Health. In 2006, she expanded the National Health Service (NHS) research base through the creation of the National Institute for Health and Care Research (whose Strategy Board she chaired) and went on to become the Chief Scientific Adviser of the Department of Health and Social Care.

=== Chief Medical Officer ===
In June 2010 Davies was appointed interim Chief Medical Officer (United Kingdom) and was confirmed as the permanent holder of that position the following year – the first woman to hold the post. The Chief Medical Officer has a rank equivalent to Permanent secretary – the highest in the Civil Service.

The 'Chief' in the job title strictly refers to the incumbent's position as the most senior doctor within the Civil Service – the Ministry of Defence and the Department for Work and Pensions, for example, both employ doctors as civil servants, as of course does the Department of Health. Despite the name, the post of Chief Medical Officer has traditionally had no particular status within the medical profession as a whole – it has some parallels with the position of Surgeon General of the United States in the USA. However, with the huge expansion in the Department of Health's purview over the past two decades, the postholder has acquired substantial practical information influence over National Health Service policy.

Unusually for a British Chief Medical Officer, Davies does not have a background as a specialist in public health. Nevertheless, Davies has written and spoken extensively about the rise of antimicrobial resistance in medicine and animal husbandry, including carrying out work to raise its profile on the international scene. Davies delegated authoring and editing her statutory annual reports to other doctors and healthcare practitioners, although she wrote an introduction to each and oversaw their compilation. She is particularly concerned about excessive alcohol consumption, especially by young women – who, she told the BBC in 2013, "we know can only take about half the alcohol that men can" and so are more prone to liver damage as a result.

In July 2013, she was asked by the BBC whether she had ever favoured female doctors in order to counterbalance discrimination against them as a group. Davies replied: "I probably do positively discriminate because, as the men appoint in their own image, so do I appoint in my own image. I like having bright sparky women around, so I do understand how difficult it can be for the men to actually challenge the stereotypes and think differently".

In her 2014 annual report, Davies said that the government needed to make tackling obesity a national priority. The report also recommended a national audit of ovarian cancer, and challenged "taboos" around the menopause and incontinence "to make sure embarrassment is never a barrier to better health."

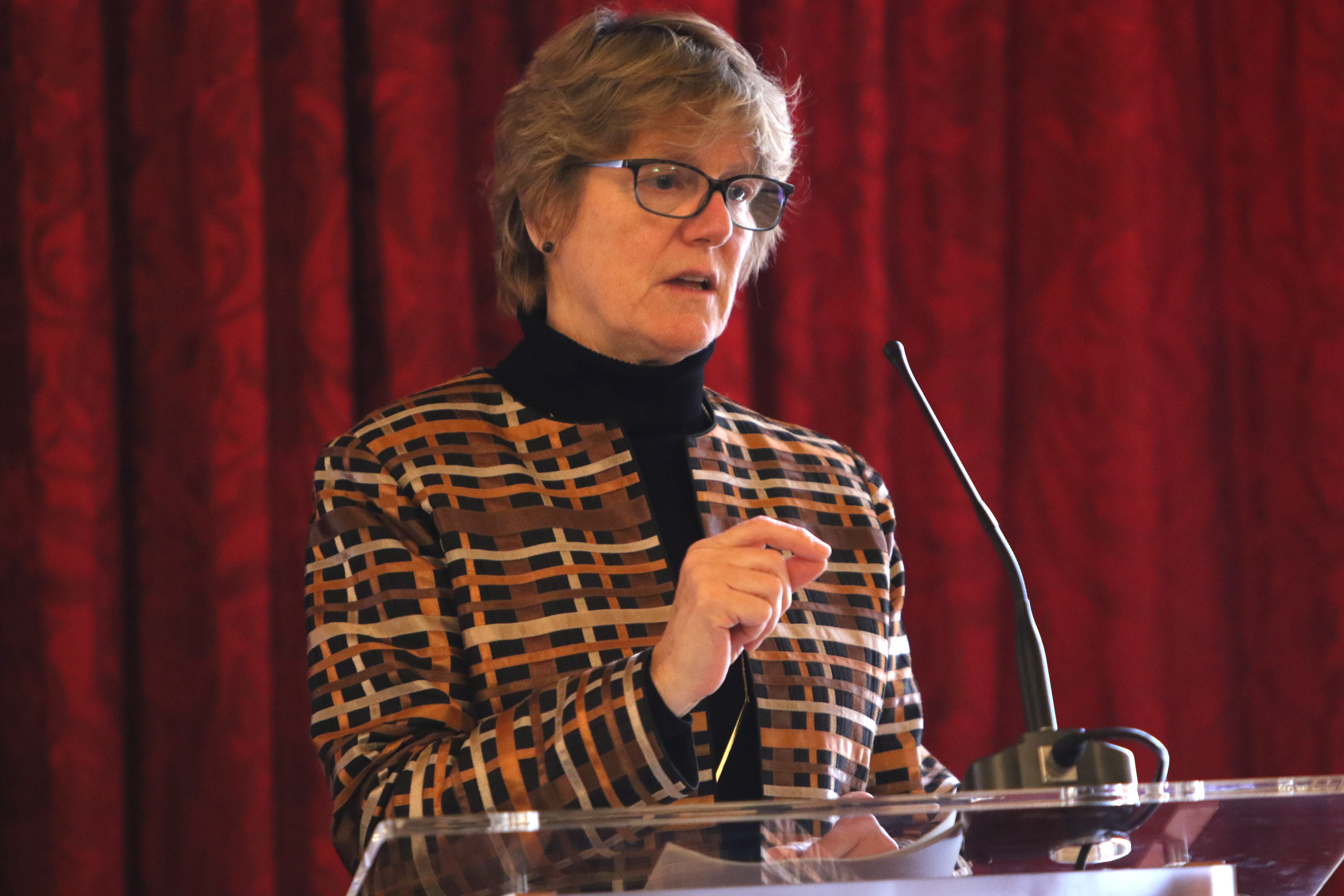
Davies speaks at a briefing for the Heads of Missions on the Review on Antimicrobial Resistance on 19 May 2016.

As of 2015, Davies was paid a salary of between £210,000 and £214,999 by the department, making her one of the 328 most highly paid people in the British public sector at that time.

In January 2016, Davies reduced the recommended weekly alcohol limit for men to that for women, in new guidelines warning of the association between alcohol consumption and some forms of cancer. The guidance gave a new weekly limit of 14 units, while at the same time saying there was no safe level of alcohol consumption. The Financial Times said the two messages were "inherently contradictory" and Professor Sir David Spiegelhalter, Winton Professor of the Public Understanding of Risk at the University of Cambridge, revealed that drinking the maximum allowance set by Davies would be no more dangerous than eating bacon sandwiches or watching films.

Davies has recommended banning promotion and advertising of junk foods. She wants plain packaging for junk foods as for cigarettes, and VAT increases on junk foods high in fat, salt or sugar. Davies said, "I think the polling data is pretty clear. The public think it’s time that governments acted to protect their children. Overweight and obesity is because we are all in this flood of unhealthy food marketing and advertising. We need to close those floodgates".

=== COVID-19 ===
Davies was heavily critical of the state of the NHS, saying that it had fewer doctors, nurses, beds and ventilators than in similar countries. Commentators were also critical of austerity and the state in which it had left the NHS and public health system. Furthermore, University College London epidemiology professor Sir Michael Marmot said that the UK had entered the pandemic with "depleted" public services, leaving it less able to cope.

=== Master of Trinity College, Cambridge ===
On 8 February 2019, she was announced Master elect of Trinity College, Cambridge, in succession to Sir Gregory Winter. She is the first woman to hold the appointment. She was installed as the 39th Master of Trinity College during a ceremony on 8 October 2019.

In 2022, Trinity College established a relief fund of £250,000 for Ukrainian students of the college facing hardship following the Russian invasion of Ukraine. In a meeting with student representatives in 2024, Dame Sally stated that she "regretted" this action, adding that the college had "no interest in divesting from arms companies".

=== UK Special Envoy on Antimicrobial Resistance ===
In June 2019, Davies was appointed as the UK Special Envoy on Antimicrobial Resistance (AMR) where she represents the UK government internationally. In her role, she also works across government on the "one health approach" and advises on the delivery of the 5-year action plan and the 20-year vision on AMR.

In addition, Davies is a member of the United Nations Interagency Coordination Group on Antimicrobial Resistance (IACG). Since 2020, she has also been a member of the Global Leaders Group on Antimicrobial Resistance, co-chaired by Sheikh Hasina and Mia Mottley.

== Awards and honours ==
In February 2013, Davies was said to be the sixth “most powerful” woman in the United Kingdom, by the BBC Radio 4 programme Woman's Hour. In 2015 the Health Service Journal ranked her as the most influential woman in the English NHS and 14th most influential person.

In the 2009 New Year Honours Davies was appointed Dame Commander of the Order of the British Empire (DBE) for services to medicine.

Davies was elected a Fellow of the Royal Society (FRS) in 2014 and a Fellow of the Academy of Medical Sciences (FMedSci) in 2002. She was awarded the Cameron Prize of the University of Edinburgh in 2017.

In the 2020 New Year Honours, Davies became the second woman (and the first outside the Royal Family, as well as ignoring foreign politicians as honorary members) to be appointed Dame Grand Cross of the Order of the Bath (GCB), for services to public health and research. On 5 March 2020, in an investiture ceremony at Buckingham Palace, she received the insignia from the Prince of Wales.

== Personal life ==
In 1974, Davies married Ralph Skilbeck, a diplomat; they divorced in 1982. She remarried in 1982; her second husband died later that year from leukaemia. In 1989 she married the Dutch haematologist Willem H. Ouwehand, a professor of haematology at the University of Cambridge, with whom she has two daughters.

Government offices
Preceded by Liam Donaldson	Chief Medical Officer for Her Majesty's Government; 2010 to 2019	Succeeded by Chris Whitty
Academic offices
Preceded by Sir Gregory Winter	Master of Trinity College, Cambridge; 2019 to 2026	Succeeded by David Baulcombe
