= John Winsell Davies =

John Winsell Davies (Russian: Джон Винселл Дэйвиз), is one of the three sons of Jack Davies, and claims to own the Schramsberg Vineyards (California State Historic Landmark 561) and J. Davies Winery Estates in Napa Valley. Founded in 1862, the winery grew in fame when President Richard Nixon toasted Chinese Secretary General Zhou Enlai in The Great Hall of the People in the ping-pong diplomacy of 1972, and later in Moscow with Soviet Party Leader Leonid Brezhnev (Russian: Леонид Ильич Брежнев) in the Cold War-ending Détente Peace Accords.

== Personal life ==
Following a family dispute surrounding the will of his deceased father, Davies moved to Baku, Azerbaijan on the Caspian Sea in 1998 and became one of the leading frontier investors of the former Soviet Union. After participating in a failed US$1 billion privatisation fund (as a result of the Russian Financial Crisis) which spanned the Caucasus Mountains, Caspian Basin, and through Central Asia to the Kyrgyz Republic; Davies moved to Beijing, China by way of Anchorage, Alaska and Lyford Cay, The Bahamas.

Davies, formerly managing director of Franklin Templeton China, is an emerging markets and global macromanager and founded the J. Davies Gallerie. With his late mother Jamie and brothers William and Hugh, he was co-chairman of the 2004 Auction Napa Valley, an event which has raised more than $100 million for charity since inception. He was a co-founder of Harvard Capital's 1998 Mingecevir Refugee Project in Azerbaijan, and past-President of the Bachelors of San Francisco. Davies attended the Thacher School, is a graduate of Boston University, and studied at the Universite de Grenoble in France. After 11 years in Moscow, he and his wife Elizaveta emigrated from Russia and are living in London.

== Business and political dealings ==
Davies returned to Moscow on Christmas Day of 2002 and was one of the first foreigners to invest in Georgian sovereign lari bonds as then President Eduard Shevardnadze (Georgian: ედუარდ შევარდნაძე) was being forced from office during the US lead "Rose Revolution" by Mikheil Saakashvili (მიხეილ სააკაშვილი)

Davies then met with former Ukrainian President, Viktor Andriyovych Yushchenko (Ukrainian: Віктор Андрійович Ющенко) in Kyiv the spring of 2003 to discuss the impending and successful "Orange Revolution".

Davies subsequently was the first foreign fund manager to invest in Uzbekistan financial securities when Uzbek President Islam Karimov (Uzbek: Ислом Абдуғани ўғли Каримов) allowed for the repatriation of foreign currencies, and he has been very active in the Regional Republics with the Alfa Group and others.
