= Maarten van Roozendaal =

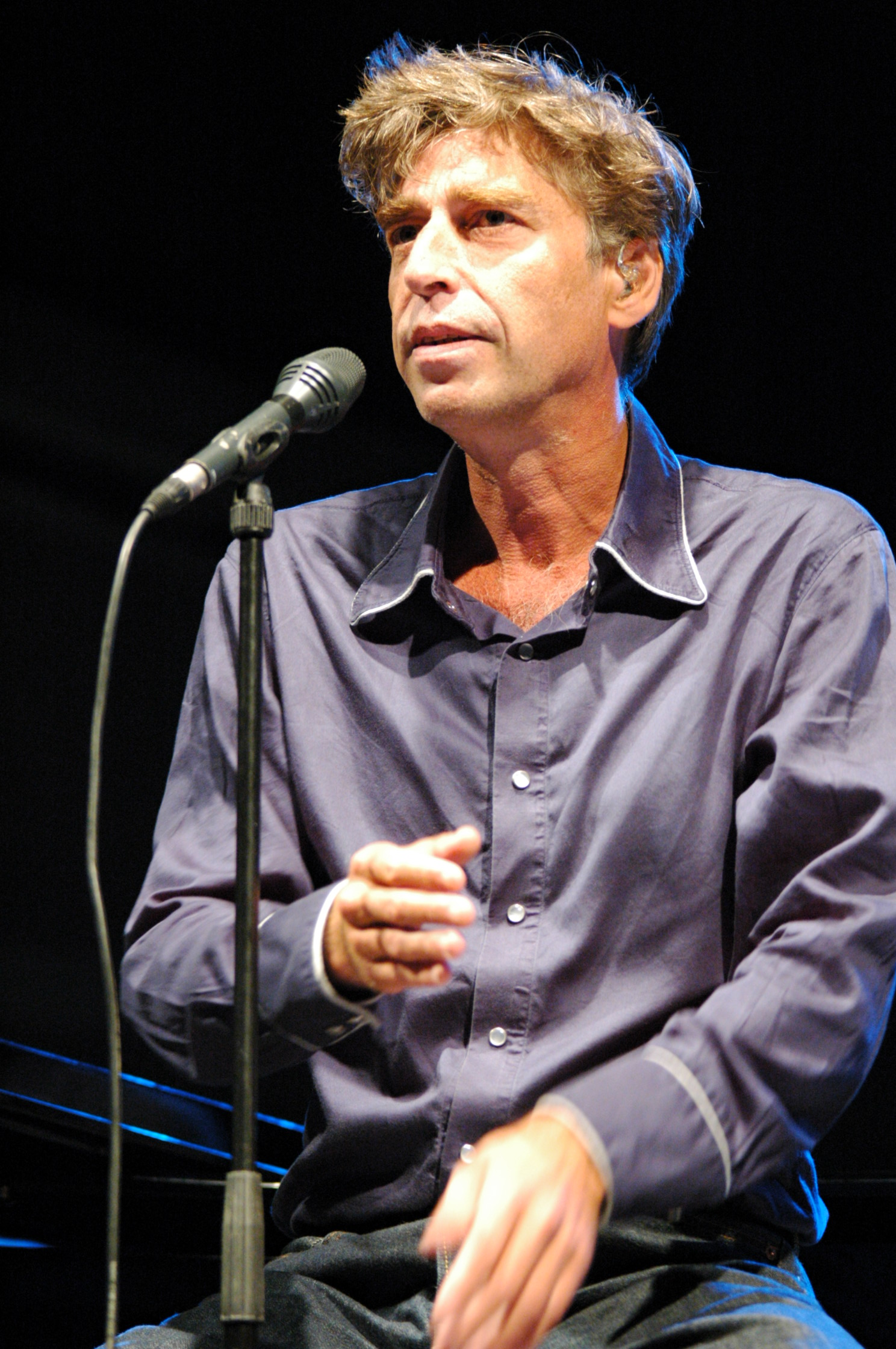
- Maarten van Roozendaal onstage at the Vondelpark, Amsterdam, the Netherlands, 23 August 2008

Background information
- Birth name: Maarten van Roozendaal
- Born: 3 May 1962; Heiloo, The Netherlands
- Origin: Heiloo, The Netherlands
- Died: 1 July 2013 (aged 51)
- Website: maartenvanroozendaal.nl

Maarten van Roozendaal (2 May 1962 – 1 July 2013) was a Dutch singer, comedian and songwriter. He recorded "I'm So Curious", and variously worked with Paul de Munnik, Willem Ennes, Egon Kracht, Marcel de Groot and Kim Soepnel.

== Biography ==
Van Roozendaal was born in Heiloo, North Holland, Netherlands. In his youth he was involved with music, and he combined this with his work as a bartender. He wrote music for Teleac school television, playing piano, plus he played drums in a punk band, and directed and advised other artists. In 1994, he won the jury and audience at the Cabaret Festival. He mainly performed his own work, but also that of Cornelis Vreeswijk and Bram Vermeulen. Van Roozendaal also put some poems by Jean Pierre Rawie to music.

Van Roozendaal's work was sometimes of a melancholy tone, at other times cynical. His recurring themes are life, love, death and drink.

On 8 February 2013 it was made public that Van Roozendaal was terminally ill with lung cancer. Subsequently, all of his performances were cancelled. Van Roozendaal died on 1 July 2013 at the age of 51.

== Theater ==
- February 29, 2012: The Common Denominator, theater concert
- May–November 2011: Nostalgia for the sky with Paul de Munnik
- July–August 2010: Hauser Orkater Tribute to Egon Kracht & The Troupe, Jan-Paul Buijs, Marcel de Groot and Thomas Spijkerman for the Parade
- 2010–2011: Without friends, solo program
- December 2009: Late Night 2009 Lebbis
- 2009: And Call It But Friends with Egon Force, Marcel de Groot, Wouter Planteijdt, Richard Heijerman and Nico Brandsen
- September 2008: Cabaret who does not like the! Gang of Four with Kees Torn, Jeroen van Merwijk and Theo Nijland
- 2008–2009: The Wild West with Egon Power and Marcel de Groot
- 2007: Stormgek (family program) with theater house on the Amstel
- 2005–2006: Barmhart with Egon Power and Marcel de Groot
- July–August 2005: Yet more nasty with Bob Fosko, Pierre van Duijl, Wouter Planteijdt, Richard Heijerman and Peter Wassenaar for the Parade
- 2004–2005: Maarten van Roozendaal Collects Work with Egon Power, Jeffrey Bruinsma, Michiel van Dijk and Marcel de Groot
- 2004: old trash at Theatre Flint with Felix Strategier, Joeri de Graaf and Egon Force (for De Roode Cinema, Amsterdam)
- July–August 2003: Nothing but rottenness with! Bob Fosko, Beatrice van der Poel, Wouter Planteijdt, Ro Krom and Nico Brandsen for the Parade
- 2002–2004: Temporary Shortage Chronic Happiness with Egon Power
- 2002: The Abstract with Egon Force (exclusively for The Red Cinema, Amsterdam)
- 2000–2002: On Counting down with Egon Power
- 1998–2000: Christmas in April with Egon Power
- 1996–1998: Exhale with Kim Soepnel (second season with Egon Force)
- 1994–1996: Night with Kim Soepnel

== Discography ==
With Paul de Munnik

- 2011: Longing for Heaven

With Egon Kracht, Marcel de Groot, Wouter Planteijdt, Richard Heijerman and Nico Brandsen

- 2010: And call it friends in real life
- 2009: And call it friends

With Egon Kracht and Marcel de Groot

- 2008: The Wild West
- 2006: Barmhart

With Willem Ennes for Children for Children

- 2005: I'm so curious (single)

With Egon Kracht, Jeffrey Bruinsma, Michiel van Dijk and Marcel de Groot

- 2005: Maarten van Roozendaal collects work

With Egon Kracht

- 2003: Temporary Shortage Of Chronic Happiness
- 2000: On Sociability Ten Under (premiere)
- 2001: Don't save me (single)
- 2000: Faithfulness (single)
- 1999: Christmas in April

With Kim Soepnel

- 1997: Exhale
- 1995: Night

== Books and DVDs ==
- 2009: So Far and Beyond (CD)
- 2009: Call it Friends (CD)
- 2009: Wild West (DVD)
- 2008: Barmhart (DVD and book)
- 2005: Deliver Me Not (Lyrics book)
