= Heiloo =

- Municipality and town
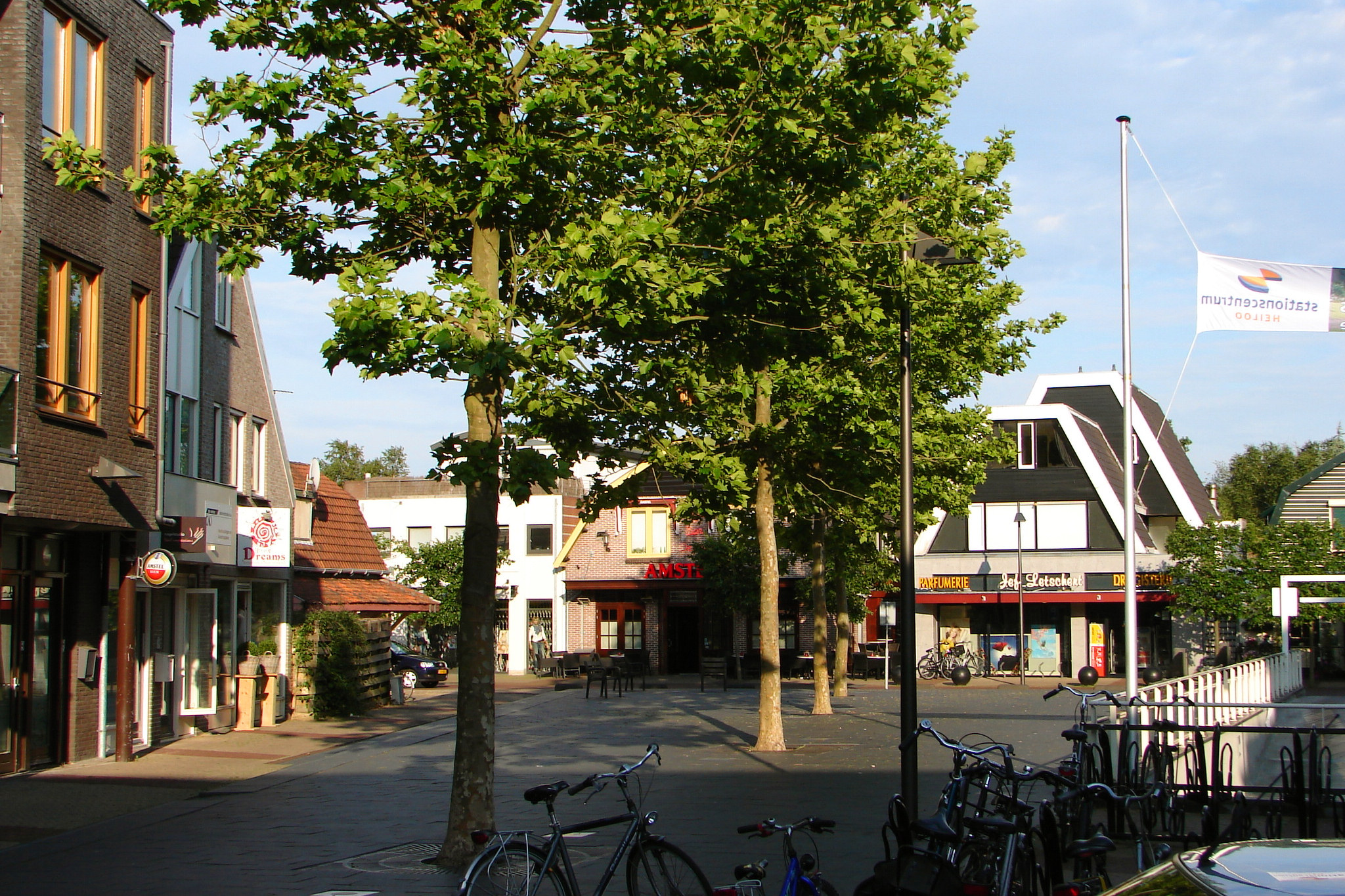
- Heiloo town centre

- Flag Coat of arms

- Location in North Holland
- Coordinates: 52°36′N 4°43′E
- Country: Netherlands
- Province: North Holland

Government
  - Body: Municipal council
  - Mayor: Mascha ten Bruggencate (D66)

Area
  - Total: 19.01 km^{2} (7.34 sq mi)
  - Land: 18.70 km^{2} (7.22 sq mi)
  - Water: 0.31 km^{2} (0.12 sq mi)
- Elevation: 3 m (9.8 ft)

Population (January 2021)
  - Total: 24,144
  - Density: 1,291/km^{2} (3,340/sq mi)
- Demonym(s): Heilooënaar, Heilooër
- Time zone: UTC+1 (CET)
  - Summer (DST): UTC+2 (CEST)
- Postcode: 1850–1852
- Area code: 072
- Website: www.heiloo.nl

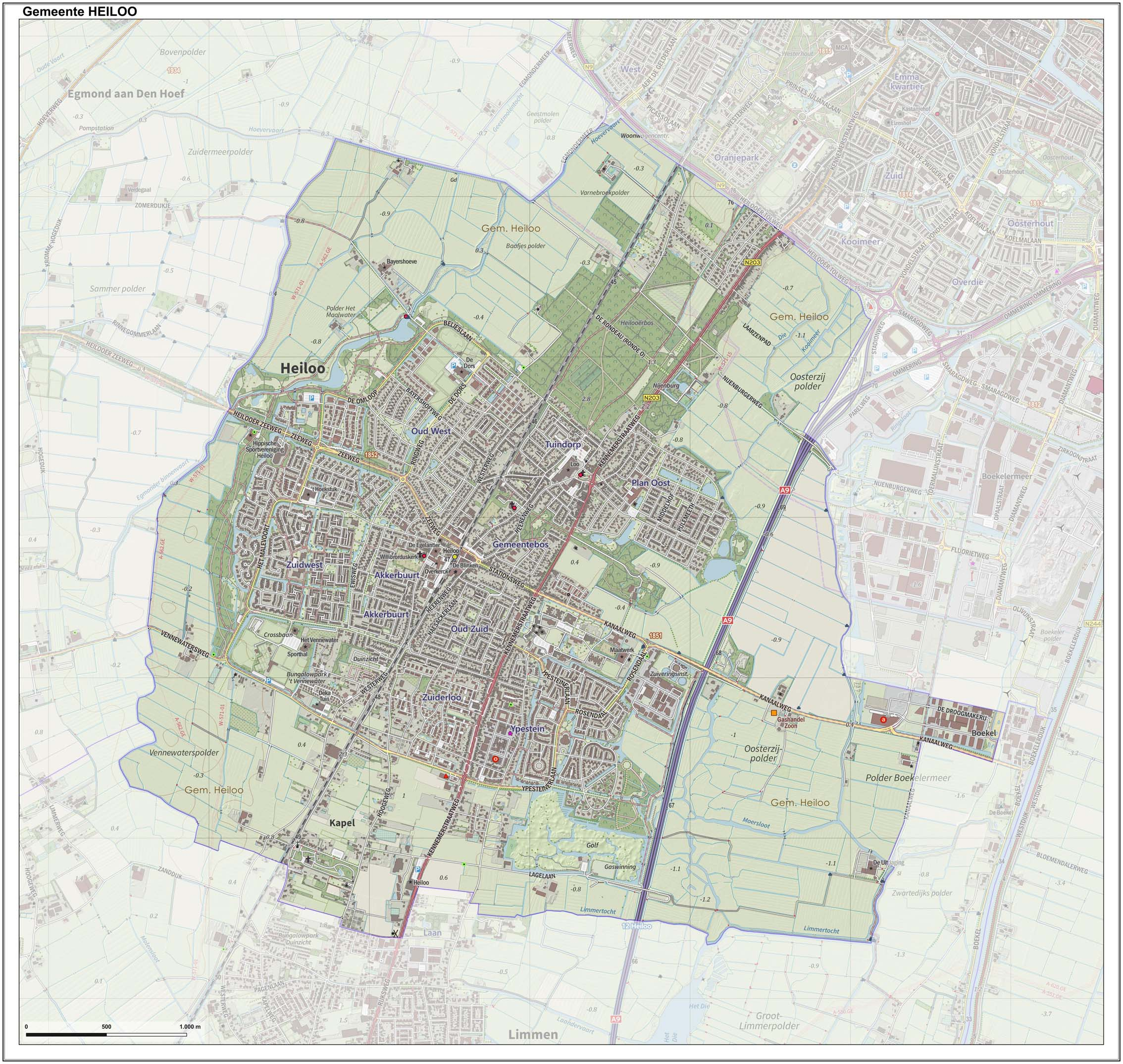
Map of Heiloo, June 2015

Heiloo (Dutch pronunciation: [ɦɛiˈloː]) is a municipality and town in the Netherlands, located in the province of North Holland. The community is part of the cooperation region Kennemerland and is located in the historical region of West Friesland. Heiloo had a population of 24,144 in 2021.

== Etymology ==
Heiloo (from the Dutch heilige loo, 'sacred forest') was given its name because Saint Willibrord was said to have performed a miracle there around 690 AD and created a church on a small hill.

== Notable attractions ==
It has a town hall dating from 1926 and a church from the 12th century known as the Witte Kerk. In the late Middle Ages a Marian shrine came into being for Our Lady in time of Need (Onze Lieve Vrouwe ter Nood). The chapel was partially destroyed in 1573 during the Spanish Siege of Alkmaar, and it was completely demolished in 1637. Before it was razed to the ground, the Alkmaar painter Gerrit Pietersz. de Jongh depicted a family on a pilgrimage at the ruins of the single wall left remaining after the siege. Pilgrimage started to flourish again in 1713 when a spring started to sprout where the chapel had stood. The Marian sanctuary, situated outside the village in a so-called procession park, is one of the major pilgrimage destinations in the Netherlands, attracting pilgrims mainly from the diocese of Haarlem-Amsterdam. In the 1950s and 1960s the population grew quickly as many residents of Amsterdam moved to the area. Many residents work and attend school in the neighbouring city of Alkmaar.

== Sporting clubs ==
- FCC Boscrossers – The local BMX club has produced 5 World Champions, 4 European Champions and many National Champions. The 2013 17-24-year-old Double World Champion for 20" and Cruiser Class was Robin Van Der Kolk, who won both titles in Auckland New Zealand.
- AV Trias – The local athletics club has produced 2 Olympic athletes, Lisanne de Witte and Laura de Witte.

== Local government ==
The municipal council of Heiloo consists of 19 seats, which at the 2026 municipal elections divided as follows:

- Heiloo 2000 – 5 seats
- GroenLinks / PvdA – 4 seats
- D66 – 3 seats
- VVD – 3 seats
- CDA – 2 seats
- Local Interest Heiloo (Gemeentebelangen) – 2 seats

Current mayor: Mascha ten Bruggencate (D66).

== Railway connections ==
Connections from Heiloo railway station include: Alkmaar, Hoorn, Uitgeest, Zaandam, Amsterdam, Utrecht, 's-Hertogenbosch, Eindhoven, The Hague, Weert, Roermond, Maastricht and Heerlen.

Until October 2013 there was a second stop on the railway line between Heiloo and Limmen, used once a month to bring pilgrims to the nearby chapel. The name of both station and chapel was 'Onze lieve vrouwe ter nood' or 'Our Lady to Need'; the station was known as Runxputte until 1914. One of the platforms was demolished in 1997 for safety reasons.

== Notable residents ==
- Marie Jungius (1864–1908), educator, writer, and activist
- Cornelis Ouwehand (1920–1996), anthropologist and a scholar of Japanese folklore

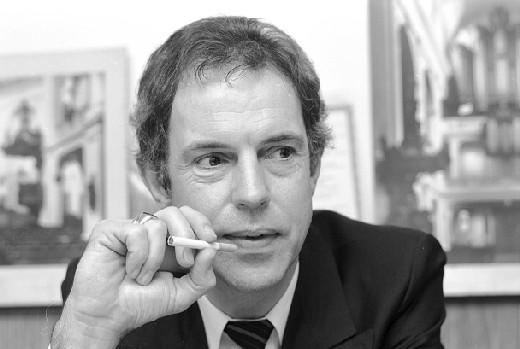
Jos Brink

- Jos van Kemenade (1937–2020), politician and sociologist
- Jos Brink (1942–2007), television and theater personality
- Guus Janssen (born 1951), composer and pianist
- Jacques Zoon (born 1961), flautist
- Maarten van Roozendaal (1962–2013), singer, comedian and songwriter
- Lars Oostveen (born 1976) stage name Lawrence Ray, is a presenter, producer and actor

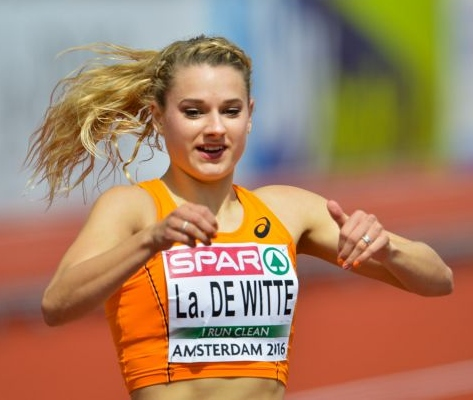
Laura de Witte, 2016

=== Sport ===
- Ron Zwerver (born 1967), retired volleyball player, competed in three consecutive Summer Olympics
- Michael Duursma (born 1978), baseball player
- Laura de Witte (born 1995), sprinter
- Joris Kramer (born 1996), footballer with over 100 club caps, currently playing for Go Ahead Eagles
- Thomas Ouwejan (born 1996), Dutch footballer currently playing for Japanese club Machida Zelvia
- Kees Smit (born 2006), footballer currently playing for AZ

== Gallery ==
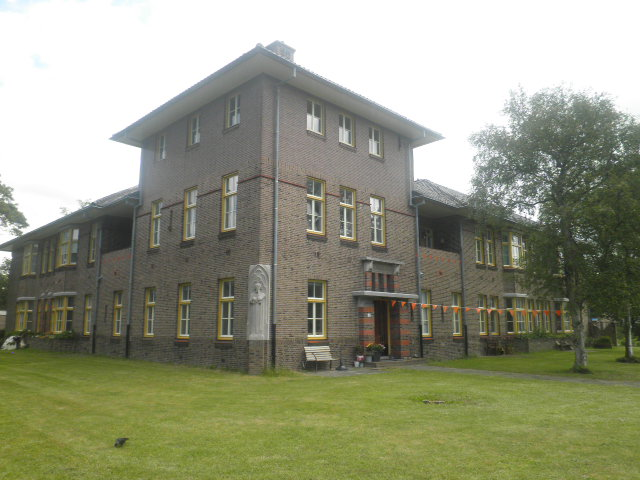
Sint Paulus, Heiloo

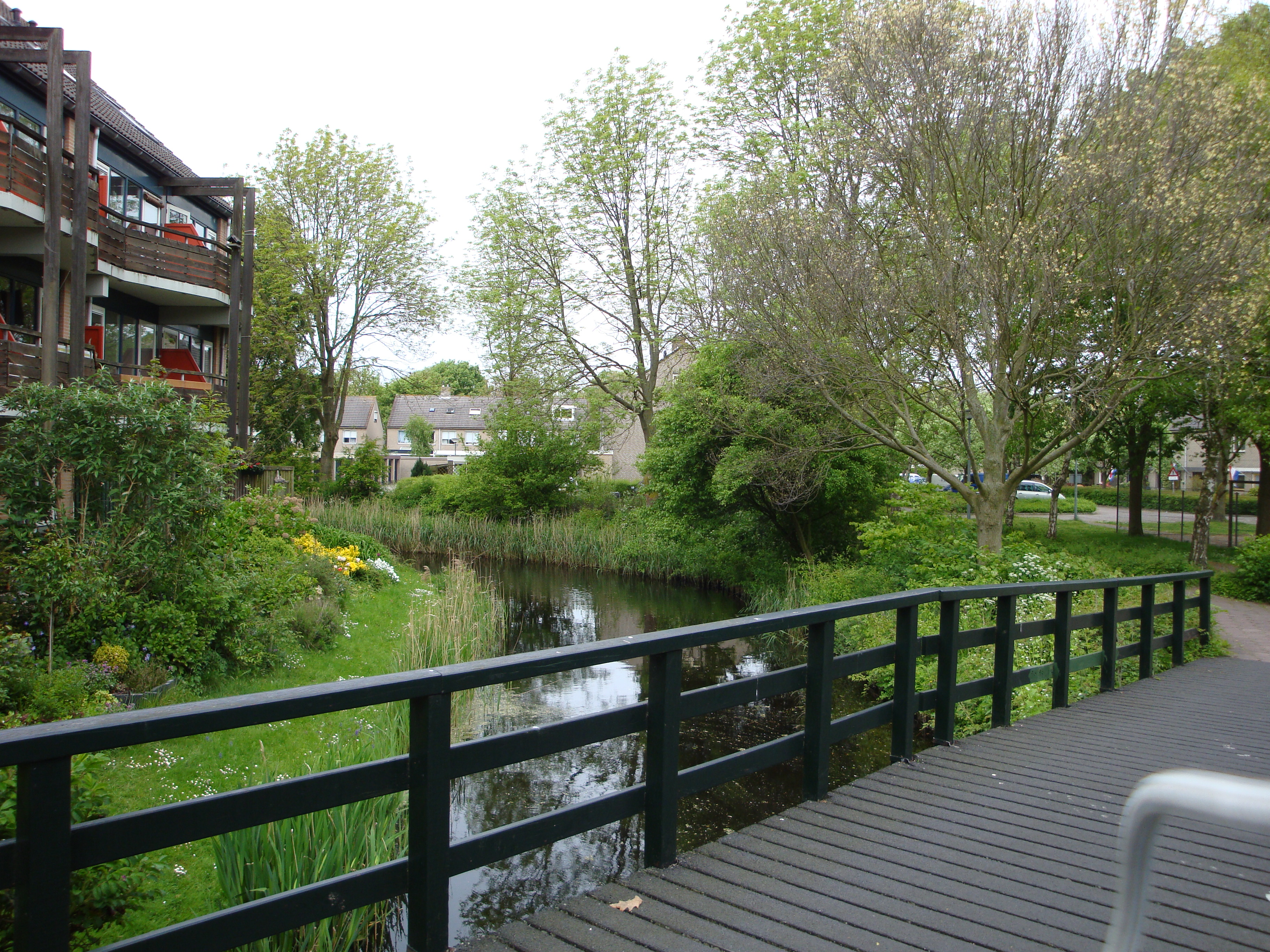
Bridge between the hoekstuk and the vlei, Heiloo

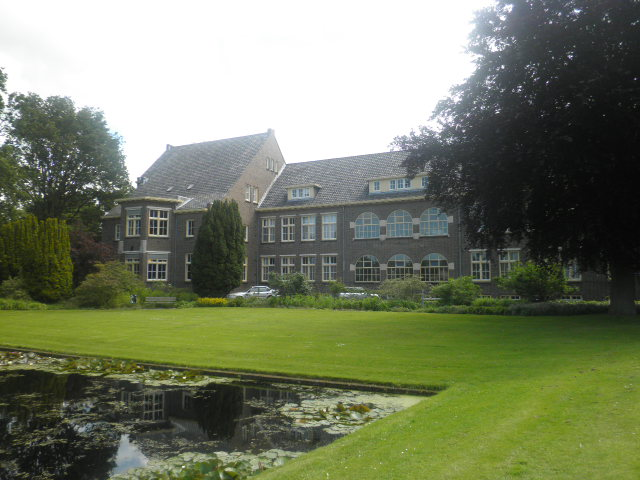
S.M. Glorieux, Heiloo

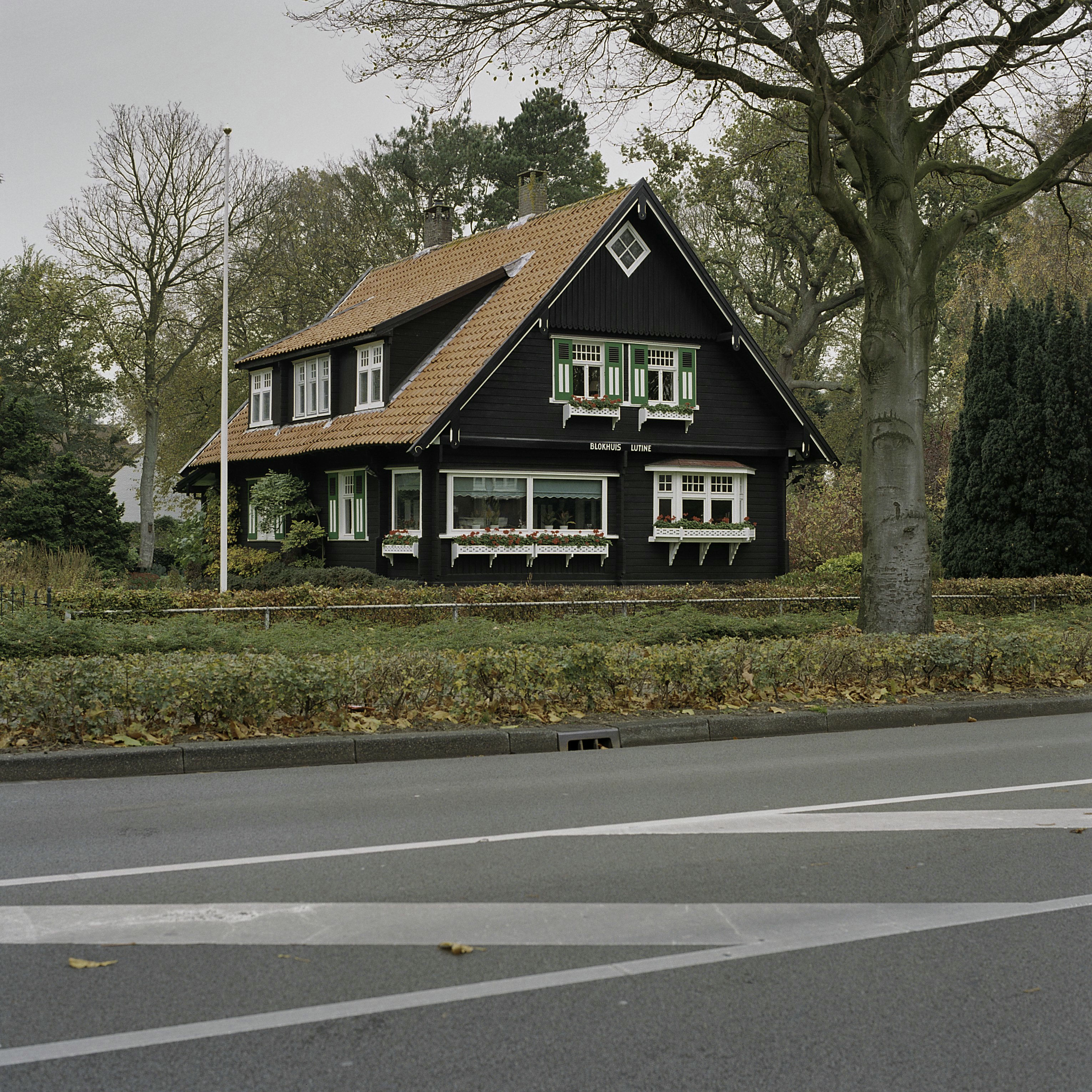
Local house, Heiloo
