= John Davies (bibliographer and genealogist) =

Welsh bibliographer and genealogist (1860–1939)

John Davies (1860–1939) was a Welsh bibliographer and genealogist. He was from the Llandysul area of Cardiganshire, and as a boy attended Capel Dewi National School. He then worked as a farm labourer, and as a collier for a while, before opening his own boots and clogs business in Lampeter.

For some time he had held an interest in Welsh books and in genealogy, especially Cardiganshire and west Wales families, and in 1908, he was appointed to a position on the staff of the newly founded National Library of Wales, assisting research workers on genealogical and bibliographical matters. He remained in the position until his retirement in 1927.

He died in Aberystwyth in June 1939, and was buried in Aberystwyth cemetery.

His surviving works include, in collaboration with Mrs Lucy E. Lloyd Theakston, a compilation of 'Some Pedigrees of the Lloyds of Allt yr Odyn, Castell Hywel, Ffos y Bleiddiaid, Gilfach Wen, Llan Llyr, and Waun Ifor' (Oxford, 1912), and a number of essays, such as, ‘Ymchwiliad Hynafiaethol a Thraddodiadol am Ellen Wyn o Ddyffrynllynod ynghyd a Theuly y Wyniaid Plwyf Llandyssul’ (1900), and ‘Hen Feirdd Plwyf Llandyssul’ (1906).
