= John Davies (footballer, born 1856) =

Welsh footballer

Personal information
- Date of birth: 1856
- Place of birth: Wales
- Date of death: 1929 (aged 72–73)
- Position: Goalkeeper

Senior career*
| Years | Team | Apps | (Gls) |
| 1878–1879 | Wrexham | | |

International career
| 1879 | Wales | 1 | (0) |
- * Club domestic league appearances and goals

John Davies (born 1856) was a Welsh international footballer. He was part of the Wales national football team, playing 1 match on 7 April 1879 against Scotland. At club level, he played for Wrexham.

== See also ==
- List of Wales international footballers (alphabetical)
