= Privatization fund =

A Privatization fund is a state-owned trust (business) holding formerly state owned enterprises and assets destined to be privatized, to be sold to private owners.

Notable privatization funds include:

- the East-German Treuhandanstalt
- the Czech První Privatizacni Fond (PPF)
- the Croatian Privatization Fund (CPF)
- the Hellenic Republic Asset Development Fund (HRADF)
- the Hungarian State Privatization Agency (Állami Vagyonügynökség)
- the Philippine Asset Privatization Trust (APF)
