= Jongejans =

Jongejan and Jongejans are Dutch surnames meaning "young John('s)". The name originated to distinguish a younger family member "Jan" from a senior one, like a father or an older brother. The latter was not uncommon; Dutch convention was to name the two oldest sons after each grandfather, who may both have been called "Jan". The common surname De Jong has a similar origin. Notable people with these surnames include:

- Ben Jongejan (born 1985), Dutch speed skater
- Daphne Jongejans (born 1965), Dutch springboard diver, sister of Edwin
- Edwin Jongejans (born 1966), Dutch springboard diver, brother of Daphne
- Ferenc Jongejan (born 1978), Dutch baseball player
- George Jongejans (1917–2016), American singer, actor and voice artist known as "George Gaynes"
