= John Leighton Davies =

Welsh rugby footballer

Personal information
- Full name: John Leighton Davies
- Born: 24 August 1927 Skewen, Wales
- Died: April 1995 (aged 67–68) Wakefield, England

Playing information
- Height: 6 ft 0 in (183 cm)
- Weight: 15 st 0 lb (95 kg; 210 lb)

Rugby union
Club
Years	Team	Pld	T	G	FG	P
≤1948–48	Neath RFC
Representative
Years	Team	Pld	T	G	FG	P
≤1948–≤48	Glamorgan County RFC	6

Rugby league
- Position: Centre
Club
Years	Team	Pld	T	G	FG	P
1948–52	Wakefield Trinity	66	42	2	0	130

John Leighton Davies (24 August 1927 – April 1995) was a Welsh rugby union, and professional rugby league footballer who played in the 1940s and 1950s. He played representative level rugby union (RU) for Glamorgan County RFC, and at club level for Neath RFC, and club level rugby league (RL) for Wakefield Trinity, as a centre.

== Background ==
John Leighton Davies was born in Skewen (his birth was registered in Swansea), Wales.

After retirement, he became a patron of Wakefield RFC, and was an active supporter of the club until his death.

He was also heavily responsible for Wakefield RFC's 'Salute to Rugby' book a compilation of "favourite recipes from famous people" including Prince Charles and the then Prime Minister Margaret Thatcher, which was published in 1980 in support of Wakefield Rugby Football Club.

An acknowledgment in the book reads

"J Leighton Davies, for his superhuman efforts in compiling all the recipes".

He was the father in law of former Wakefield RFC captain Martin Shuttleworth, and grandfather of Otley's Iain Shuttleworth.

He died aged 67–68 in Wakefield, West Yorkshire, England.

== Playing career ==
John Leighton Davies made his début for Wakefield Trinity during October 1948.

== Contemporaneous Article Extract ==
"Born in Skewen, South Wales, gained international schoolboy honours at Neath Technical. Played for Neath R.U., and had represented Glamorgan County on six occasions to reach the verge of international honours before turning to R.L. in October 1948. Looked set for an illustrious professional career when a succession of knee injuries forced his premature retirement in 1952."
