= Willem H. Ouwehand =

Dutch-born haematologist and geneticist

Willem Hendrik Ouwehand
- Born: August 1953 (age 73)
- Education: University of Amsterdam (MD, PhD)
- Known for: Platelet biology, blood cell genomics, transfusion genomics, rare disease genomics
- Spouse: Dame Sally Davies
- Awards: Fellow of the Academy of Medical Sciences (FMedSci)
- Scientific career
- Fields: Haematology, Genomics, Transfusion medicine
- Workplaces: University of Cambridge; NHS Blood and Transplant

Willem Hendrik Ouwehand (born August 1953) is a Dutch-born haematologist and geneticist. He is Emeritus Professor of Experimental Haematology at the University of Cambridge. His research has focused on platelet biology, blood cell genetics, transfusion medicine and clinical genomics.

== Career ==
Ouwehand studied medicine in the Netherlands before joining the University of Cambridge and NHS Blood and Transplant in 1989. He was promoted to Reader in 2004 and Professor in 2010. In 2004 Ouwehand founded the Bloodomics Consortium, an international collaboration investigating the genetic basis of blood cell formation and platelet biology. He subsequently became a founding member of the NIHR BioResource and served as Director of its Rare Diseases programme. Under his leadership, the programme undertook a pilot study that informed the UK's 100,000 Genomes Project, demonstrating the clinical utility of whole-genome sequencing for patients with rare diseases. Among the researchers who have worked with Ouwehand is Nicole Soranzo, who later became known for her work in human genetics.

Ouwehand chairs the Blood Transfusion Genomics Consortium, an international collaboration developing genomic methods for blood group typing and precision transfusion medicine. Following his retirement from the University of Cambridge in 2023, he became Emeritus Professor and continues to lead collaborative research in clinical genomics and artificial intelligence through honorary appointments with Cambridge University Hospitals NHS Foundation Trust, University College London Hospitals NHS Foundation Trust, NHS Blood and Transplant and the Wellcome Sanger Institute.

== Honours ==
Ouwehand is a Fellow of the Academy of Medical Sciences and has served as a Senior Investigator of the National Institute for Health and Care Research (NIHR).

== Personal life ==
Ouwehand is married to Dame Sally Davies, Master of Trinity College, Cambridge and former Chief Medical Officer for England.
