= John Davey (cricketer) =

English cricketer

Personal information
- Full name: John George Davey
- Born: 21 June 1847; Brighton, Sussex, England
- Died: 4 May 1878 (aged 30); Brighton, Sussex, England
- Batting: Right-handed
- Bowling: Right-arm roundarm medium
- Role: Occasional wicket-keeper

Domestic team information
- Years: Team
- 1874–1876: Marylebone Cricket Club
- 1869–1873: Sussex

Career statistics
Competition	First-class
Matches	7
Runs scored	80
Batting average	8.00
100s/50s	–/–
Top score	32
Balls bowled	–
Wickets	–
Bowling average	–
5 wickets in innings	–
10 wickets in match	–
Best bowling	–
Catches/stumpings	8/–
- Source: Cricinfo, 30 June 2012

John George Davey (21 June 1847 – 4 May 1878) was an English cricketer. Davey was a right-handed batsman who bowled right-arm roundarm medium pace and who occasionally fielded as a wicket-keeper. He was born at Brighton, Sussex.

Davey made his first-class debut for Sussex against Kent at Crystal Palace Park Cricket Ground in 1869, with him making a further appearance against Kent a week later at the Higher Common Ground, Tunbridge Wells. He made two further first-class appearances for Sussex, against the Marylebone Cricket Club at Lord's Cricket Ground in 1867 and Kent at the same venue in 1873. In his four first-class matches for the county, he scored 66 runs at an average of 13.20, with a high score of 32. In 1874, he made his first-class debut for the Marylebone Cricket Club against Nottinghamshire, with him playing a further first-class match for the club against Surrey in 1876. He played one first-class match for England against a combined Kent and Gloucestershire side at the St Lawrence Ground, Canterbury.

He died at the town of his birth on 4 May 1878.
