= John Davies (rugby union, born 1897) =

Welsh rugby player (1897–1929)

- Full name: John Henry Davies
- Born: 22 December 1897 Michaelston-y-Fedw, Wales
- Died: 10 May 1929 (aged 31) Cwmavon, Wales

Rugby union career
- Position: Wing forward
International career
Years	Team	Apps	(Points)
1923	Wales	1	(0)

John Henry Davies (22 December 1897 – 10 May 1929) was a Welsh international rugby union player.

A forward from Aberavon RFC, Davies was described as "one of the discoveries of the season" by the Western Mail in 1923, the same year he received his solitary Wales cap. He was a late call up for Wales when several players declared themselves unavailable to make the trip to Dublin and was utilised in the back row.

Davies worked as a furnace man and spent a brief period at a steel works in the United States. He went missing on the evening of 9 May 1929 after leaving his home in Neath Port Talbot to go for a walk. A search party found Davies' hat floating in the Ynysgwas Reservoir and his body was subsequently recovered by a diver. His death was ruled a drowning by the coroner, who determined Davies had likely dived in on account of a foot impression on the edge of the reservoir.

== See also ==
- List of Wales national rugby union players
