= John Haydn Davies =

John Haydn Davies (1905 – 1991) was a Welsh schoolmaster and conductor. His family lived in the Rhondda area, and he was introduced to music whilst attending Blaencwm Welsh Baptist Chapel. He was educated at Blaencwm Elementary School, before winning a scholarship to attend Tonypandy Grammar School. He then trained as a teacher at Caerleon College, and took up a position at Blaencwm Primary, Rhondda (where he became the Headmaster). As a young schoolmaster he became conductor of the Blaencwm Choral Society, and was so competent that he was invited to become assistant conductor of the Treorchy Male Choir. In 1946 he became the choir's principal conductor, and held the post until he retired in 1968. From 1960 he held the position of Headmaster of Brodringallt Primary in Ystrad, remaining there for the rest of his career.

He died of coronary thrombosis at the East Glamorgan Hospital in 1991, and is buried at Treorchy Cemetery.
