= John Davie (British Army officer) =

John Davie during the Malaya Emergency

Lieutenant-Colonel John Davie MBE MC (3 March 1921 – 29 June 2015) was a British army officer who served on an anti-aircraft battery during the Siege of Malta and later won the Military Cross fighting communist insurgents during the Malayan Emergency.

== Life ==
Davie was born in London, where his Scottish father had a timber importing business. He was educated at Gresham's School, Holt, Norfolk, and he was briefly educated at the East Anglian Institute of Agriculture, where he arrived in September 1940. In November it was shut down because of the threat of a German invasion, and Davie joined the ranks of the Royal Artillery. After serving in the Malta Campaign, he went to a War Office Selection Board in Cairo and was commissioned into the Seaforth Highlanders. Joining the regiment's 6th Battalion, he saw active service in Mandate Palestine, the Italian Campaign, and north-west Europe, finding himself in Lübeck at the end of the war. In 1945 he married Coralie Garnham, and they had one son and one daughter.

Remaining in the army as a regular soldier, in 1948 Davie served with the 1st Battalion the Seaforth Highlanders in the Malaya Emergency, commanding a company in jungle fighting and leading it for eighteen months in operations against the Communist terrorists, gaining the Military Cross. In the following ten years, he saw served in West Germany, Singapore, Brunei, and North Borneo. In 1966, he was posted to the Ministry of Defence as assistant military secretary and retired from the Army in 1968. He then joined Curtis and Henson, land and estate agents, in London, before settling in Scotland, where he was a land agent in the first Savills office to open there. After managing estates across Scotland, in 1973 he joined the National Trust for Scotland, first as its representative in the north-east and then as its deputy director. He retired at the age of 65 but continued to work part-time as factor on an estate in the Isle of Arran.

Davie was appointed a Member of the Order of the British Empire in 1962; in Scotland he served as a Member of the Royal Company of Archers, the Queen's Bodyguard.
