= Cornelis Ouwehand =

Dutch anthropologist

- Born: 10 November 1920; Leiden
- Died: 5 September 1996 (aged 75); Heiloo
- Occupation: Anthropologist

Cornelis Ouwehand (10 November 1920 – 5 September 1996) was a Dutch anthropologist and a scholar of Japanese folklore. He is considered the founder of Japanese Studies in Switzerland.

== Biography ==
Cornelis Ouwehand was born in Leiden on 10 November 1920. He began his studies in 1938, and at the University of Leiden he completed the training course for the Indonesian Civil Service. He studied also Japanese, Chinese, and cultural anthropology. He was a colonial officer at Larantuka before his academic career, and published studies on land rights in East Flores and agricultural co-operation in Adonara in the 1950s.

In 1968, Ouwehand accepted the Japanese Chair in the Ostasiatisches Seminar at the University of Zürich, a position which Ouwehand held until his retirement in 1986. He died in Heiloo, the Netherlands, on 5 September 1996.

== Works ==
In 1964, Cornelis Ouwehand published his Doctor of Letters thesis entitled Namazu-e and their Themes: an interpretative approach to some aspects of Japanese folk religion, a "detailed, structuralist" study of catfish images (namazu-e). This included a study of the kappa, a sea creature in Japanese folklore. The book was translated in Japan in 1979 as Namazu-e. Minzokuteki Sôzôryoku No Sekai 鯰 絵 - 民俗的想像力の世界, by Komatsu Kazuhiko, Nakazawa Shinichi, Iijima Yoshiharu, and Furuie Shinpei.

In 1985 Ouwehand published Hateruma: socio-religious aspects of a South-Ryukyuan island culture, an ethnographic study which examines the ritual life in Hateruma, part of the Yaeyama Islands.
