= John Davies (composer) =

Welsh stone-mason and composer (1787–1855)

John Davies (13 November 1787 – 27 April 1855) was a Welsh stone mason and composer. Born at Banwen, Morriston, Glamorganshire, he began his career as a stone-mason, notably working both day and night. He married at the age of 24, and the couple moved into a house he built in Treboeth, Swansea.

He had been taught to play the dulcimer by a lodger at the age of about fourteen, but it was not until he was about thirty that he seriously began to study music, becoming both a performer and a composer.

His works include a number of anthems and hymn tunes, such as "Gethsemane" (Lleuad yr Oes, 1827), which was arranged by Rowland Huw Pritchard.

He died in 1855 in Llanelli, and was buried in Mynydd-bach cemetery.
