= John Davies (librarian) =

Librarian of the University of Cambridge (1743–1817)

John Davies (1743–1817) was the librarian (bibliothecarius) of the University of Cambridge from 1783 to 1817.

He was educated at Westminster School, and entered Trinity College, Cambridge in May 1761. He graduated B.A. in 1765 and M.A. in 1768. He became a Fellow of Trinity in 1766 and was Junior Bursar from 1782 to 1790.

He was ordained as a deacon in 1766 and as a priest in 1772. He then served as perpetual curate of Leominster (1767), curate of St Mary the Great Cambridge (1783–84), vicar of Shudy Camps (1784–86), vicar of Flintham (1785-1804), perpetual curate of Kneeton (1786-1804), and Rector of Orwell (1804–17).
