= Jack Davies (footballer, born 1902) =

English footballer

Personal information
- Date of birth: 30 March 1902
- Place of birth: Chorley, England
- Date of death: 1985 (aged 82–83)
- Height: 5 ft 11 in (1.80 m)
- Position: Goalkeeper

Senior career*
Years	Team	Apps	(Gls)
- Horwich RMI
1925–1927	Bury	5	(0)
1927–1929	Swansea Town	5	(0)
- Horwich RMI
1932–1933	Wigan Athletic	10	(0)
- Horwich RMI
- * Club domestic league appearances and goals

Jack Davies (30 March 1902 – 1985) was an English footballer who played in the Football League for Bury and Swansea Town. He also played for Horwich RMI and Wigan Athletic,

Davies joined Wigan Athletic from Horwich RMI. He made 10 appearances in the Cheshire League during the club's inaugural season in 1932–33.
