= John Gordon Davies =

British theologian (1919–1990)

John Gordon Davies (1919–1990) was Edward Cadbury Professor of Theology at the University of Birmingham. He was educated at King's School (Chester), Christ Church (Oxford) and Westcott House (Cambridge). He worked in the dockland parish of Rotherhithe before joining the University of Birmingham, and he was also Director of the Institute for the Study of Worship and Religious Architecture in the University.

He was born into a family of wine and spirits merchants in Chester and after switching from the study of History to Theology at Oxford, trained for the Anglican Ministry at Cambridge where he met and married (Emily) Mary Tordoff. He was a pacifist during the war. After he moved to Birmingham he became a prolific theologian, writing about a book a year. Their second daughter Sally Davies became Chief Medical Officer of England and the first female Master of Trinity College, Cambridge.
