= Jack Davies (football trainer) =

John Henry Davies, known as Jack Davies, was employed by Wolverhampton Wanderers Football Club as assistant trainer in 1920. In 1930 he was promoted to first team trainer where he served under Major Frank Buckley. During his 16 years as first team trainer at Wolves, the club went from the Second Division to narrowly missing out on the First Division Championship title in the 1937- 38, 1938-39 seasons and were FA Cup runners up in 1939. Over this period Wolverhampton Wanderers became one of the best teams in England. Jack persuaded the Wolves board to keep a young Stan Cullis, who in later years as a manager reigned over the club’s most successful period. Jack also persuaded Major Buckley not to release Billy Wright, who the club had deemed too short in height to make the grade as a professional footballer. Billy Wright went on to win three Football League championships and the FA Cup, whilst amassing 105 international caps for England. In later years Jack worked at the club as the Central League trainer, youth team trainer and then finally dressing room attendant for the club, until 1978.

In April 2023 Jack Davies was formally recognised by Wolverhampton Wanderers Football Club for his 58 years of service and loyalty by being inducted into the club’s Hall of Fame. Jack Davies was inducted along with Alf Bishop, Robbie Dennison, Joe Gardiner, Geoff Palmer, Phil Parkes, Mike Stowell and Dennis Wilshaw.

Merv Davies collected the award on behalf of his late grandfather. Merv Davies played a key role together with fellow co-author Tim Gibbons in getting Jack’s achievements recognised through their 2019 book publication, ‘Training with Wolves’. All profits from the sales from ‘Training with Wolves’ book were donated to the Alzheimer’s society charity. In October 2021, a cheque presentation took place at the Wolves Museum to Alzheimer’s society for a £1,500 donation.

Career honours

Wolverhampton Wanderers

First Division •Runners-up: 1937-38, 1938-39

Second Division •Champions: 1931-32

FA Cup •Runners-up: 1939

Football League War Cup (Northern) •Winners: 1941-42

Central League •Champions: 1950-51, 1951-52, 1952-53

FA Youth Cup •Winner: 1958 •Runners-up:1953, 1954

Giller, Norman (2003) Billy Wright: A Hero for All Seasons, ISBN 1-86105-528-5 - page 22.
