= John Gwynoro Davies =

Welsh Methodist minister (1855–1935)

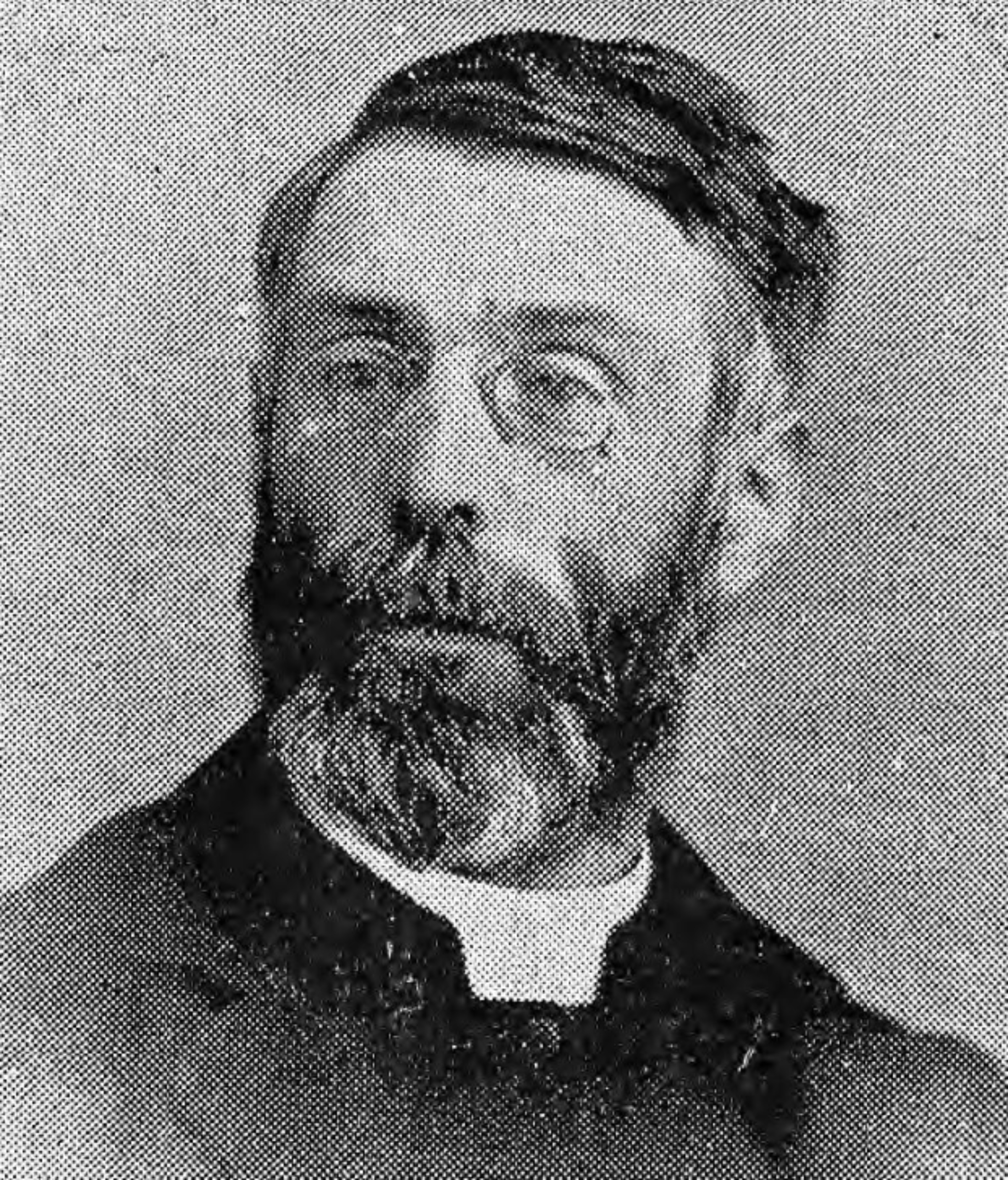
John Gwynoro Davies

John Gwynoro Davies (1855 - 1935) was a Welsh Methodist minister. His father was minister Evan Davies. He was born in Llanpumpsaint, Carmarthenshire, and attended a local school, where he became a pupil-teacher. At just 20 years of age he was appointed headmaster of Dinas school, Rhondda. A few years later he decided to enter the Calvinistic Methodist ministry, and in 1877 entered Aberystwyth University College. He later moved to North Wales to study at Bala College. In 1887 he was appointed minister of Caersalem, Barmouth, and remained there until his death in 1935.

His written works include a number of articles he wrote for 'Y Gwyddoniadur Cymreig', and Flashes from the Welsh Pulpit (Hodder and Stoughton, 1889), which has an introduction written by Thomas Charles Edwards.
