= John Davies (footballer, born 1959) =

Welsh footballer

Personal information
- Full name: John Gerwyn Davies
- Date of birth: 18 November 1959 (age 66)
- Place of birth: Llandysul, Wales
- Height: 6 ft 3 in (1.91 m)
- Position: Goalkeeper

Senior career*
Years	Team	Apps	(Gls)
1977–1980	Cardiff City	7	(0)
1980–1986	Hull City	43	(0)
1986	→ Notts County (loan)	10	(0)
Total		60	(0)
- * Club domestic league appearances and goals

John Gerwyn Davies (born 18 November 1959) is a Welsh former professional footballer who played as a goalkeeper.

== Career ==
Davies began his career with Cardiff City after progressing through the club's youth system. He made his professional debut in 1977 and went on to make seven league appearances during his two years in the first team, being used as cover for first choice goalkeeper Ron Healey. In 1980, he was sold to Hull City for £12,000, spending six years at the club. He also later played for Notts County on loan.

Following his retirement from playing, Davies worked for Hull City for nearly 30 years as a youth coach and helped found the club's community programme in 1990. He stepped down in September 2018.
