= Freiston Shore RSPB reserve =

RSPB nature reserve in Lincolnshire

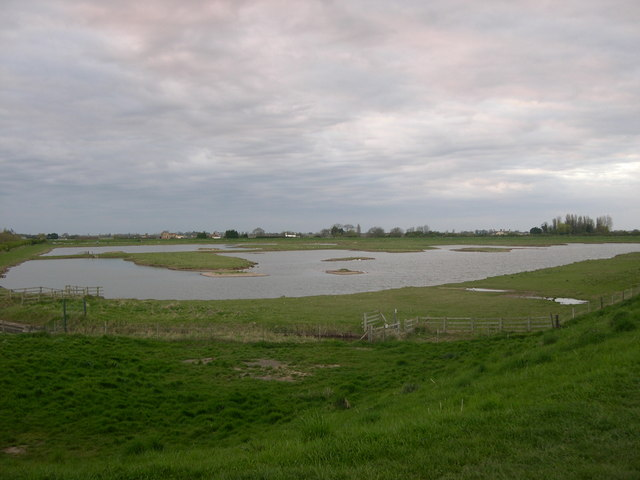
- Artificial lagoon, Freiston Shore

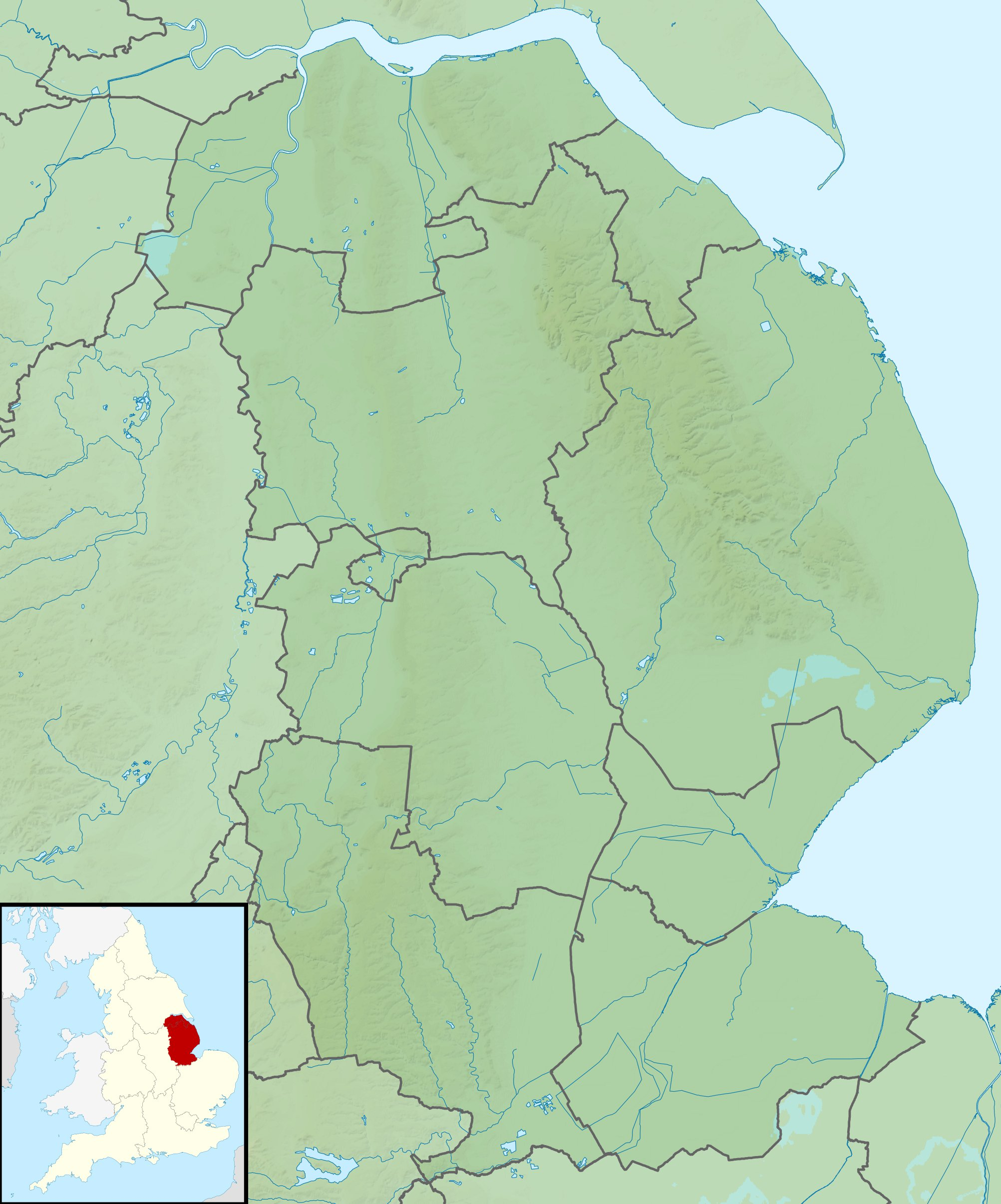
- Location within Lincolnshire
- Location: Freiston Shore, Lincolnshire, England
- Coordinates: 52.9620°N 0.0790°E
- Area: 66 hectares (160 acres)
- Operator: RSPB
- Website: www.rspb.org.uk/days-out/reserves/freiston-shore

Freiston Shore is a nature reserve in Lincolnshire, England managed by The Royal Society for the Protection of Birds (RSPB). The reserve is situated at Freiston Shore on the coast of The Wash, 4 miles from the town of Boston, north of the mouth of the River Witham. It is centred on the creation of a new salt marsh as part of a managed realignment of sea defences.

== History ==
A new sea wall was built in 1983 to claim an area from The Wash for use as agricultural land by HM Prison Service. However, exposure to erosion resulted in it being at risk of failure during the 1990s. The Environment Agency therefore decided to restore the original alignment of the sea defences. The RSPB took this as an opportunity to create a new wetland nature reserve, and purchased the land. The sea wall was breached in three places in 2002, after which the site "has been naturally regenerating"..

== Flora and fauna ==
Following the managed realignment the Department for the Environment, Food and Rural Affairs commissioned monitoring of "the natural development of the salt marsh in the realignment site". This found that vegetation and invertebrate colonisation were successful, and that "the managed realignment acts as an important nursery habitat for a range of different fish species, including bass, sprat and herring, throughout the entire tidal cycle"

A wide variety of birds can be seen on the reserve at different times of year, including waders such as Common ringed plovers; passerines such as Eurasian skylarks, Tree sparrows and Yellowhammers and ducks such as Common eider, Red-breasted merganser and Eurasian wigeon. The RSPB also highlights the large numbers of Dark-bellied brent geese that visit the site.

== Facilities ==
The RSPB provides a car park and cycle parking, with a noticeboard providing information about the reserve. There are two hides and two viewpoints on the reserve, as well as a picnic area and 5 miles (8 km) of trails.
