= Environmental migrant =

People who leave a region because of a changing environment

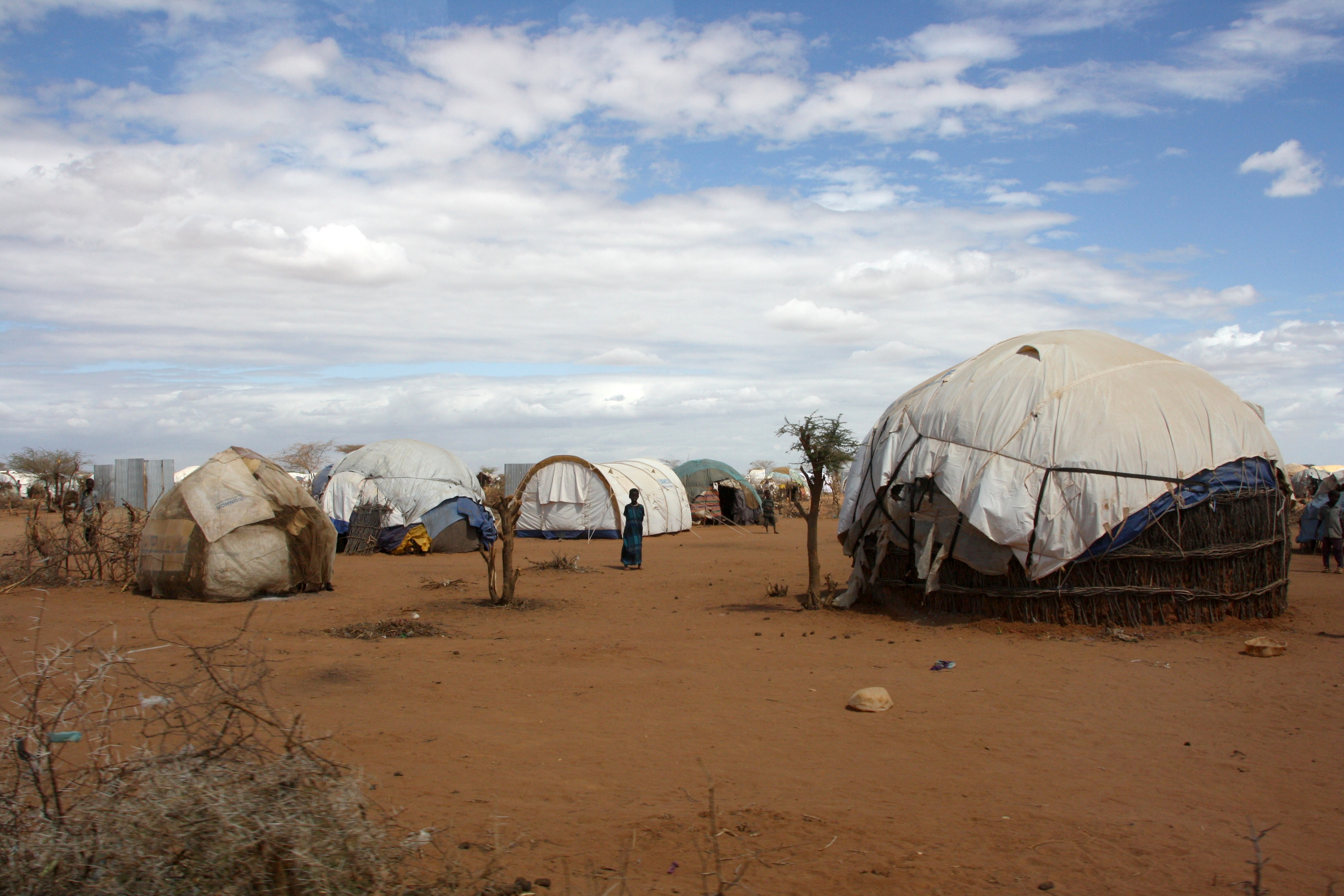
Shelters in Kenya for those displaced by the 2011 Horn of Africa drought

Environmental migrants are people who are forced to leave their home of residency due to sudden or long-term changes to their local or regional environment. These changes compromise their well-being or livelihood, and include increased drought, desertification, sea level rise, and disruption of seasonal weather patterns (such as monsoons). Though there is no uniform, clear-cut definition of environmental migration, the idea is gaining attention as policy-makers and environmental and social scientists attempt to conceptualize the potential social effects of climate change and other environmental degradation. Environmental migration also reflects broader global inequalities, as marginalized and racialized communities often experience the most severe environmental degradation while having the least resources and political power to adapt or relocate. Environmental migrants originate from a variety of different locations, including Small Island Developing States.

"Environmental migrant" and "climate migrant" (or "climate refugee") are used somewhat interchangeably with a range of similar terms, such as ecological refugee, environmental refugee, forced environmental migrant, environmentally motivated migrant, environmentally displaced person (EDP), disaster refugee, environmental displacee, eco-refugee, ecologically displaced person, or environmental-refugee-to-be (ERTB). The distinctions between these terms remain contested.

== Definition and concept ==
The term "environmental refugee" was first proposed by Lester Brown in 1976. The International Organization for Migration (IOM) proposes the following definition for environmental migrants:

"Environmental migrants are persons or groups of persons who, for compelling reasons of sudden or progressive changes in the environment that adversely affect their lives or living conditions, are obliged to leave their habitual homes, or choose to do so, either temporarily or permanently, and who move either within their country or abroad."

IN 1985, UNEP (United Nations Environment Programme) researcher Essam El-Hinnawi defined environmental refugees as:

"those people who have been forced to leave their traditional habitat, temporarily or permanently, because of a marked environmental disruption (natural and/or triggered by people) that jeopardized their existence and/or seriously affected the quality of their life [sic]. By 'environmental disruption' in this definition is meant any physical, chemical, and/or biological changes in the ecosystem (or resource base) that render it, temporarily or permanently, unsuitable to support human life."

Climate migrants are a subset of environmental migrants who were forced to flee "due to sudden or gradual alterations in the natural environment related to at least one of three impacts of climate change: sea-level rise, extreme weather events, and drought and water scarcity."

Critics of these definitions argue that they overlook the structural and political drivers of displacement, such as colonial legacies, racialized land use policies, and unequal resource extraction. Scholars in environmental justice studies emphasize that these factors shape who becomes displaced, making environmental migration a social and political issue as much as an ecological one.

== Types ==
The International Organization for Migration proposes three types of environmental migrants:

- Environmental emergency migrants: individuals who flee temporarily due to an environmental disaster or sudden environmental event. (Example: someone forced to leave due to a natural disaster)
- Environmental forced migrants: individuals who have to leave due to deteriorating environmental conditions. (Example: someone forced to leave due to a slow deterioration of their environment such as deforestation, coastal deterioration, etc. The village of Satabhaya in the Kendrapara district of Odisha in India is "one of the foremost victims of coastal erosion and submergence due to rising sea levels". The villagers were losing their homes to the encroaching sea and their cultivable lands to saline ingress, and were forced to migrate elsewhere. In Nepal, many villages in mass migration have been reported from Sivalik Hills / Chure regions due to water scarcity. Similarly, in eastern highland of Nepal 10 households in Chainpur, Sankhuwasabha, 25 households in Dharmadevi and 10 households in Panchkhapan have been forced to migrate due to water crises in their areas.
- Environmental motivated migrants also known as environmentally induced economic migrants: individuals who choose to leave to avoid possible future problems. (Example: someone who leaves due to declining crop productivity caused by desertification. A study conducted between 2014 and 2018 reveals that a large proportion of the deltaic populations of Volta delta in Africa, the Ganges Brahmaputra Meghna delta in Bangladesh and India, and Mahanadi delta in India cited economic reasons as a cause of their migration and only 2.8% cited environment reasons. One third of migrant households perceived an increased exposure to environmental hazards and deltaic populations associated environmental factors with more insecure livelihoods).

Other scholars have proposed various other types of migrant including:

- Pressured environmental migrants – slow onset This type of migrant is displaced from their environment when an event is predicted prior to when it would be imperative for the inhabitants to leave. Such events could be desertification or prolonged drought, where the people of the region are no longer able to maintain farming or hunting to provide a hospitable living environment.
- Imperative environmental migrants – gradual onset These are migrants that have been or will be "permanently displaced" from their homes due to environmental factors beyond their control.
- Temporary environmental migrants – short term, sudden onset- This includes migrants suffering from a single event (i.e. Hurricane Katrina). This type of migrant is displaced from their home state when their environment rapidly changes and disastrous events occur, such as tsunamis, hurricanes, tornadoes, and other natural disasters. These migrants are able to move back to the place they fled from granted that they are able to rebuild what was broken, and go on to maintain a similar quality of life to the one prior to the event.

== Global statistics ==
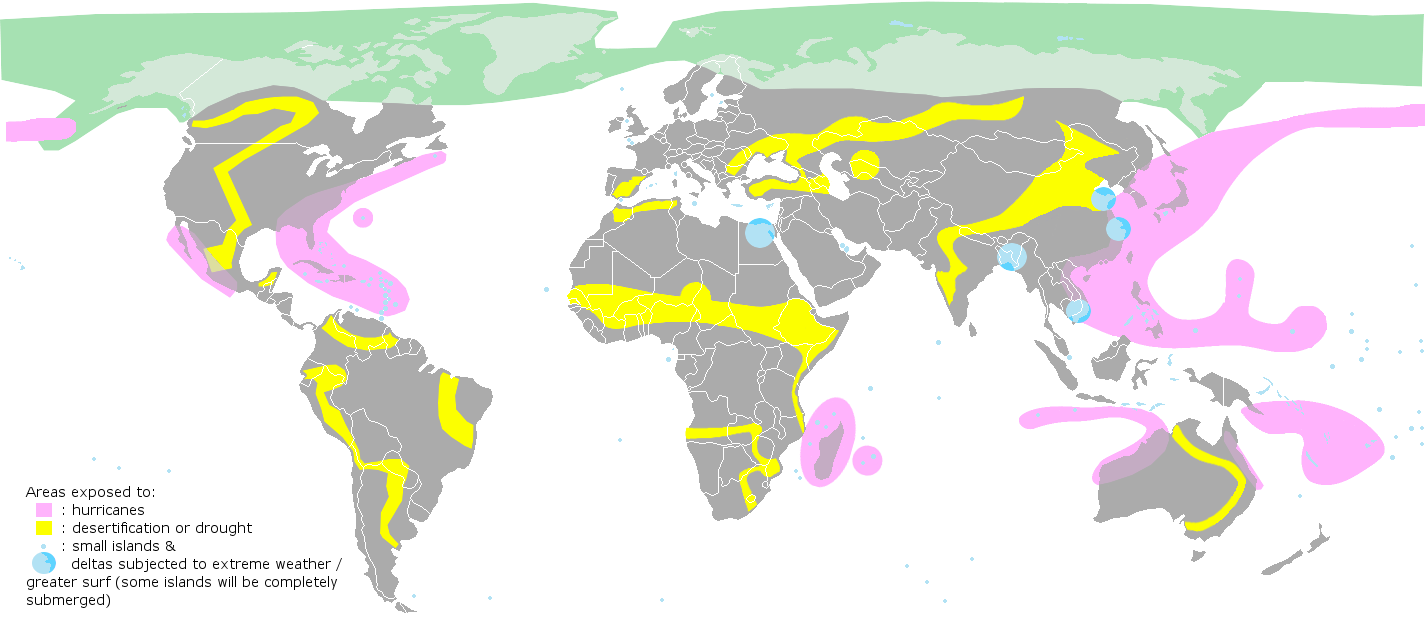
A map showing where natural disasters caused/aggravated by global warming may occur. Previously, environmental refugees were expected from these regions but they are often internal refugees.

There have been a number of attempts over the decades to enumerate environmental migrants and refugees. In 1988, Jodi Jacobson became the first researcher to calculate the total number of environmental migrants, stating that there were already up to 10 million environmental refugees. Drawing on 'worst-case scenarios' about sea-level rise, she argued that all forms of 'Environmental Refugees' would be six times as numerous as political refugees. By 1989, Mustafa Tolba, Executive Director of United Nations Environment Programme, proposed that the number of environmental refugees could exceed 50 million people if the world did not begin to work towards sustainable development.

In the mid-1990s, British environmentalist, Norman Myers, became the most prominent proponent of this 'maximalist' school', noting that "environmental refugees will soon become the largest group of involuntary refugees". He stated that there were 25 million environmental refugees in the mid-1990s, further claiming that this figure could double by 2010, with an upper limit of 200 million by 2050. Myers argued that the causes of environmental displacement would include desertification, lack of water, salination of irrigated lands and the depletion of biodiversity. He also hypothesized that displacement would amount to 30m in China, 30m in India, 15m in Bangladesh, 14m in Egypt, 10m in other delta areas and coastal zones, 1m in island states, and with otherwise agriculturally displaced people totaling 50m by 2050. More recently, Myers has suggested that the figure by 2050 might be as high as 250 million.

Vikram Kolmannskog has stated that Myers' work can be 'criticized for being inconsistent, impossible to check and failing to take proper account of opportunities to adapt'. Myers himself has acknowledged that his figures are based upon 'heroic extrapolation'.

== Places of origin ==
=== Small Island Developing States ===
Many environmental migrants originate from Small Island Developing States (SIDS), where the effects of rising sea levels, increasing natural disasters, and the depletion of fresh water supplies have significantly affected the habitability of these states. Over 65 million people spread across 39 countries live in SIDS, many of whom are highly vulnerable to social, economic, and environmental changes. Due to their vulnerability to climate change, SIDS have become increasingly uninhabitable, which has caused many environmental migrants to flee their countries in search of a safer environment. As of 2020, an estimated 11.5 million individuals originating from SIDS were living outside their country of birth. In the future, the number of environmental migrants from these countries is projected to increase significantly due to the anticipated continuation of environmental disasters. The countries face many financial, legal, and political barriers regarding environmental migration since they are low on resources and economic stability. There are multiple islands within SIDS that are experiencing increasing levels of environmental migrants. Islands in the Pacific Ocean such as Kiribati, Vanuatu, and Fiji are in immediate danger from the threats of rising sea levels. Other Caribbean Islands such as Barbados have dealt with a significant rise in environmental migrants due to climate-related challenges. A significant portion of Caribbean environmental migrants have sought refugee in the United States, with over two-thirds of Caribbean migrants residing there as of 2020.

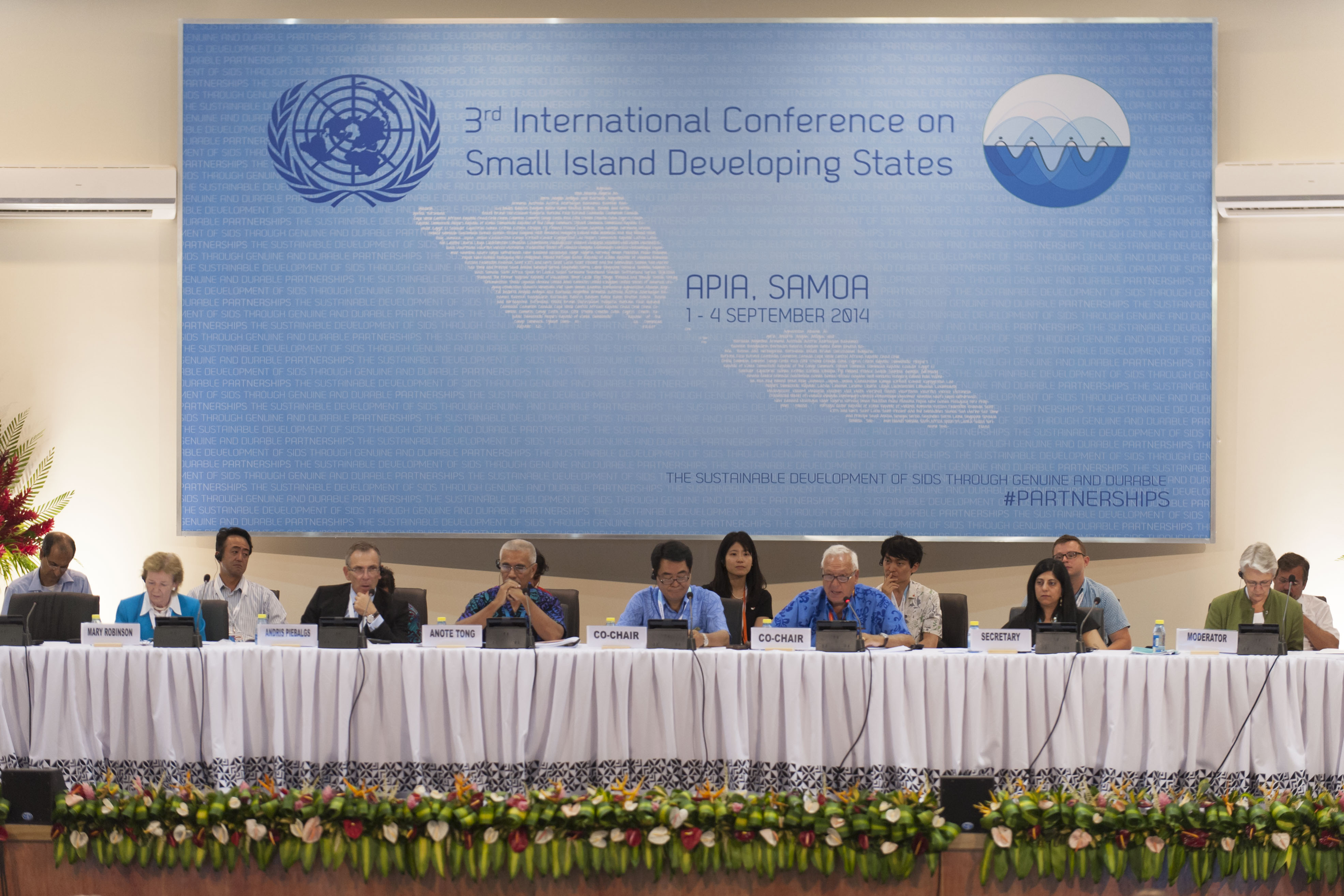
2014 Small Island Developing States meeting in Samoa

There have been efforts by economically advanced countries to help the SIDS through international support mechanisms such as the Green Climate Fund and Adaptation Fund. SIDS have also been active participants in the United Nations Framework Convention on Climate Change (UNFCCC) for making progress towards preventing migration issues and pushing for stronger policies. In September 2014, the SIDS met in Apia, Samoa to form the SAMOA Pathway, a ten year plan that addresses climate change faced in the islands. Political figures such as Mia Mottley emphasize the need for a major increase in investment and global support to address the limitations of SIDS and environmental migrants.

Efforts to address the environmental migrants are also being made in other neighboring regions. In the Philippines, legislators are attempting to change the country's immigration policies to accommodate for environmental migrants that are fleeing from SIDS. The proposed House Bill No. 10490 aims to amend the Philippine Immigration Act of 1940 to expand the criteria for refugee status beyond the traditional categories of persecution, religion, and politics to include climate change.

== International security concerns ==
In recent decades, attempts to understand the implications of climate change have become more common in political discourse. In 2022, the Secretary-General of the United Nations António Guterres stated that the Intergovernmental Panel on Climate Change (IPCC) was a, "code red for humanity." He raised the alarm that not only were many of the changes to the climate now irreparable, it would have widespread consequences for the world's ability to maintain peace. When fights between farmers and herders in Nigeria broke out in 2018, the over 1,000 casualties accounted for several times more than civilian deaths in fights with Boko Haram. 2 billion people live in areas where violence and instability threaten development.

This sort of discourse began in the 1990s when several armed conflicts erupted in sub-Saharan Africa. As the Arctic sea ice diminishes, concerns over the militarization of the Arctic zone have been raised as those regional powers begin to compete for control of possibly newly created shipping lanes and access to untapped natural resources. There are two scenarios in which migration caused by climate change can raise security concerns. Scarcity-conflict scenarios, when a population dependent on a certain amount of resources find themselves unable to rely on them anymore. This could be soil fertility or precipitation or water access. As the timeline of restricted access increases, runaway competition can lead to violence that will only make scarce resources even harder to find. Climate change is the cause of this potential tipping point for a population. Abundance-Competition scenarios are when an area that contains a high amount of a desired resource, like lithium or diamonds, those in power can exert economic control over those who wish to access it. This also creates competition that when not resolved, can lead to violence. Factionalization occurs and fighting ensues until control is regained by the victorious group. Living standards will rapidly deteriorate and people caught in the crossfire will likely be forced to either leave or engage in the violence.

It is possible that the Arctic zone will lose all its ice by 2035. Nations with economic interests like China, Russia, and the United states are planning to enact control over that region for new trade routes. Heatwaves killed 15,000 in France in 2003 and 356,000 people were estimated to have been killed by excessive heat in 2019. By 2070, 1-3 billion of the world's population will be living in areas where the average annual temperature will be above 84 °F (29 °C). The rise of heatwaves will lead to the increased occurrence of droughts and fires, making already unstable areas more dangerous to live in and prone to violence.

== Environmental racism and intersectional impacts ==
Environmental migration is shaped by structural inequalities that determine who is most vulnerable to climate and ecological disruption. Scholars have noted that environmental degradation and climate change disproportionately affect communities that are already marginalized by histories of colonization, racism, and economic exploitation, a phenomenon described as environmental racism. Environmental racism refers to the systemic exposure of racialized and Indigenous populations to environmental hazards and their exclusion from decision-making about land, development, and resource extraction.

In many regions, environmental migration is directly linked to these structural injustices. For instance, oil extraction in the Niger Delta (Nigeria) has led to severe pollution and displacement of local communities, many of whom are Indigenous or Black, while multinational corporations continue to profit from the region’s resources. Similarly, Small Island Developing States (SIDS) such as Kiribati and Tuvalu face heightened risks from sea-level rise despite contributing minimally to global emissions, reflecting ongoing patterns of climate colonialism.

Environmental migration is also gendered. Women, particularly Indigenous and Black women often experience compounded exposure to environmental harm due to their roles in caregiving, food production, and community survival. This dynamic contributes to what feminist scholars describe as a global “health hierarchy,” in which gender, race, and class intersect to determine who bears the burden of environmental degradation.

Addressing these inequities requires moving beyond technical or economic solutions toward policies that center environmental justice, Indigenous sovereignty, and the redistribution of resources and decision-making power.

== Society and culture ==
=== Popular culture ===
The notion of 'environmental migrant' has been a part of popular culture at least since The Grapes of Wrath, a 1939 novel by John Steinbeck.

=== Documentary films ===
- Eco Migrants: The Case of Bhola Island (2013), documentary movie directed by Susan Stein. Starring Katherine Jacobsen, Nancy Schneider, Bogumil Terminski
- Refugees of the Blue Planet (2006), documentary movie directed by Hélène Choquette & Jean-Philippe Duval.
- The Land Between (2014) documentary movie directed by David Fedele.

== See also ==
- Climate migration – Persons fleeing from climate change effects
- Dust Bowl – 1930s period of severe dust storms in North America
- Ecological collapse – Ecological communities abruptly losing biodiversity, often irreversibly
- Effects of climate change
- Forced displacement – Coerced movement of a person or persons away from their home or home region
- List of areas depopulated due to climate change – Impacted settlements resulting in climate migration
- Managed retreat – Coordinated movement of people and buildings away from risks
- Mudslide – Form of mass wasting
- Space and survival – Idea that spacefaring is necessary for long-term human survival(A hypothetical extreme case in science fiction)
- Typhoon – Regional tropical cyclone
- United Nations High Commissioner for Refugees – UN agency to protect and support refugees
- Water scarcity – Situation where there is a shortage of water
