= Freiston Shore =

Settlement in the Borough of Boston, in Lincolnshire, England

Coordinates: 52.9620°N 0.0790°E

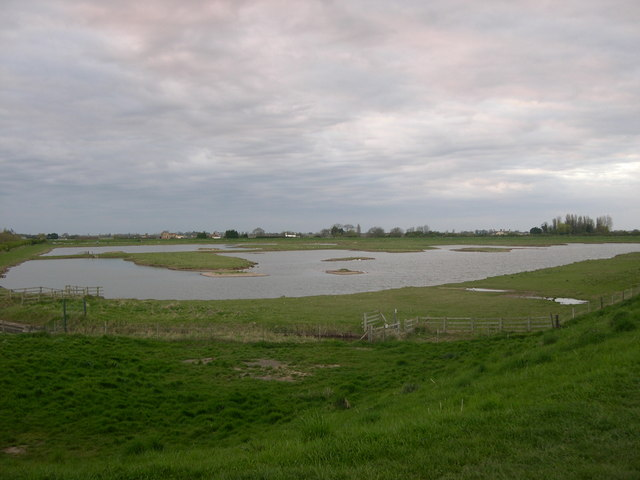
- Artificial lagoon, Freiston Shore

- Location within Lincolnshire
- OS grid reference: TF397425
  - London: 100 mi (160 km) S
- Civil parish: Freiston
- District: Boston (borough)
- Shire county: Lincolnshire
- Region: East Midlands
- Country: England
- Sovereign state: United Kingdom
- Post town: Boston
- Postcode district: PE22
- Police: Lincolnshire
- Fire: Lincolnshire
- Ambulance: East Midlands
- UK Parliament: Boston and Skegness

Freiston Shore is a settlement in the Borough of Boston, in Lincolnshire, England. It is in the civil parish of Freiston, and approximately 4 miles (6 km) east from Boston.

== History ==
Freiston Shore

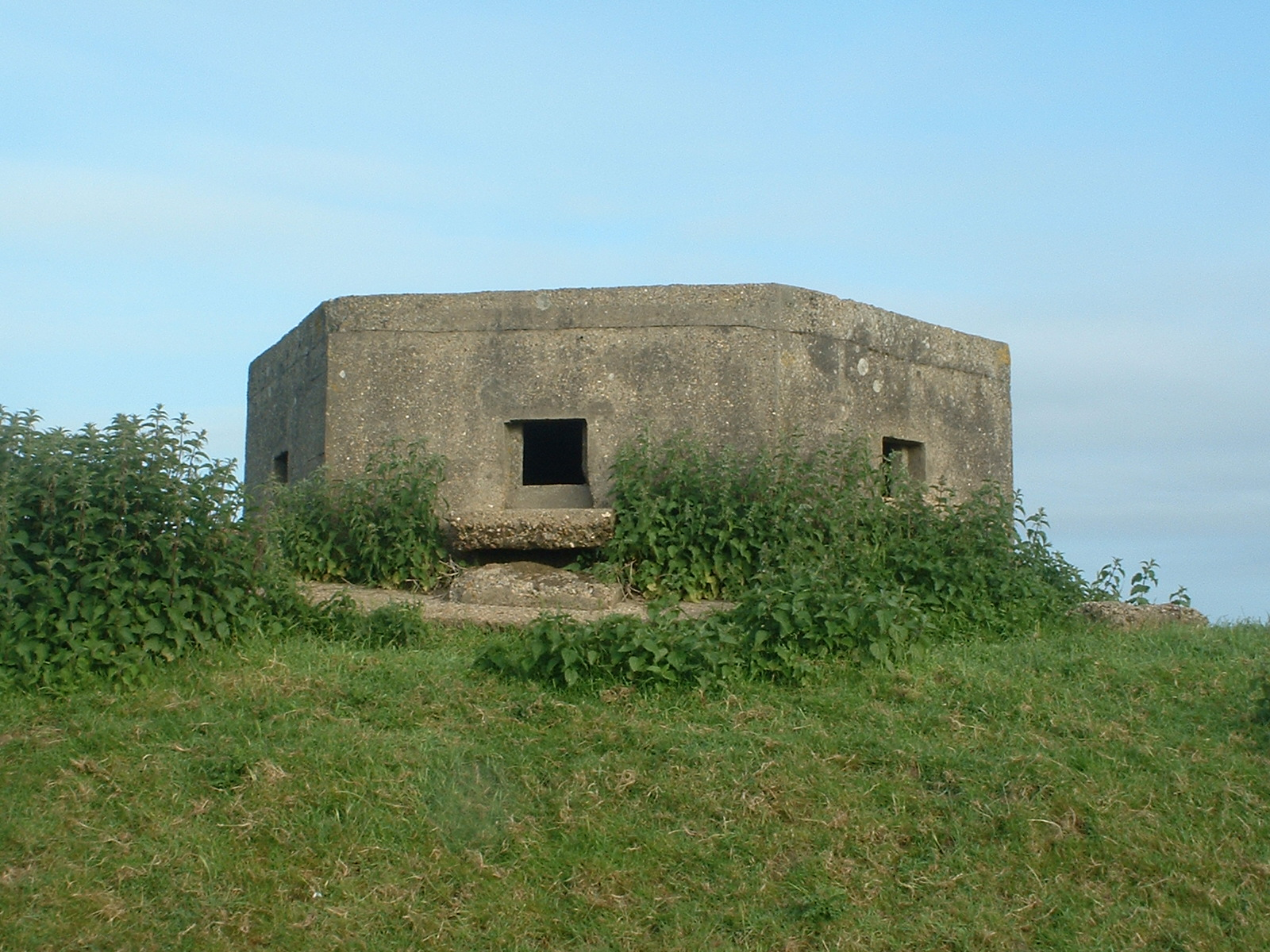
Type 22 pillbox, Freiston Shore

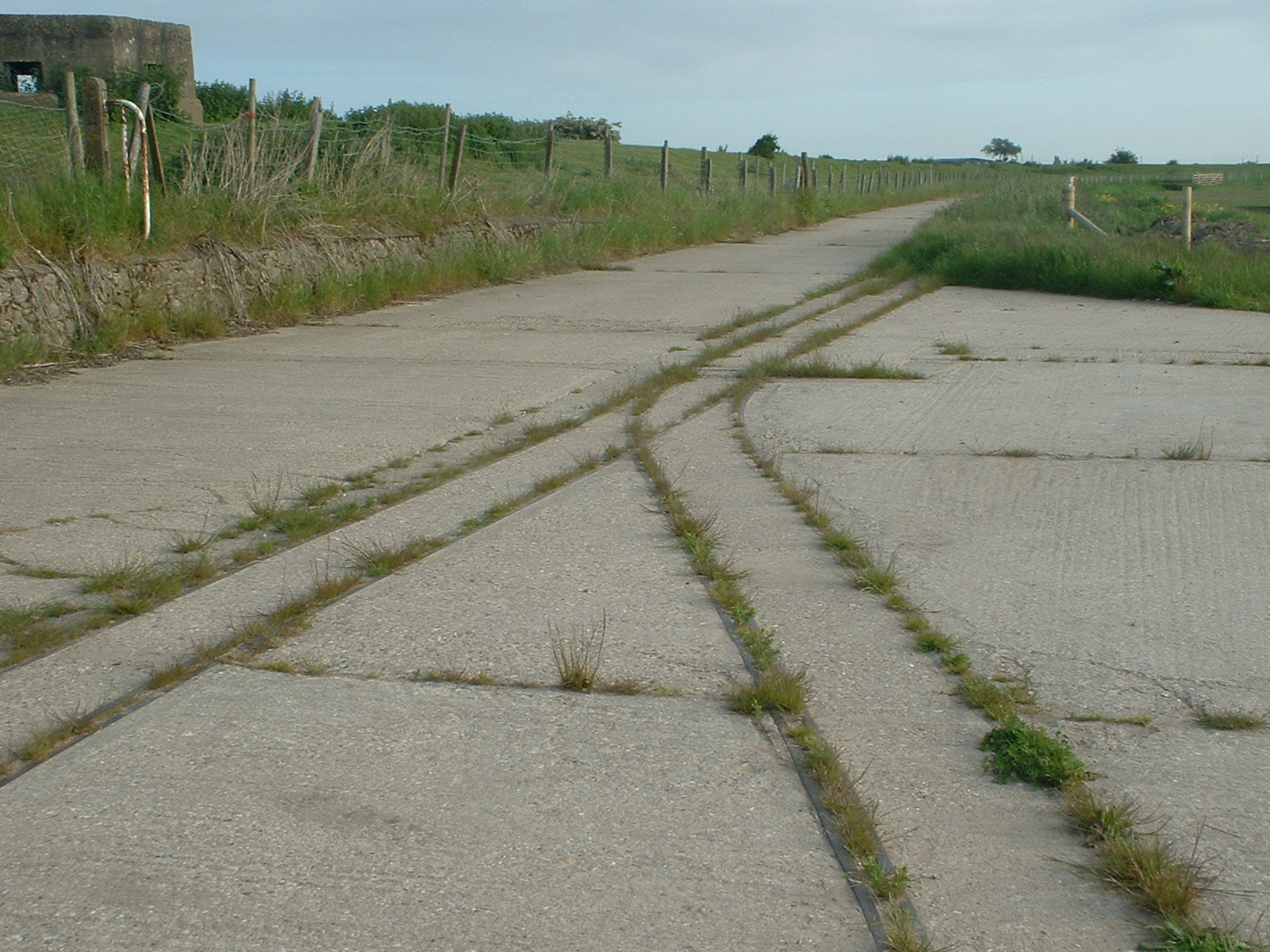
Light railway track remains

In the late 18th and early 19th centuries, Freiston's sandy shore on The Wash was developed as a sea bathing resort. By the mid-19th century there were horse races and other attractions on the beach. However, the process of coastal accretion caused a salt marsh to develop, leaving hotels without customers. Since the mid-20th century, more marsh has been enclosed behind sea banks for use as arable land.

During the Second World War, defences were constructed around Freiston Shore as a part of British anti-invasion preparations of World War II. A number of pillboxes, gun emplacements and coastal lights were constructed. The remains of these fortifications can be seen today including a Ruck machine gun post, of a type once widespread in Lincolnshire.

Following the Second World War, land reclamation led to the village becoming inland by about half a mile. The original sea bank, with its pillboxes and some of the Freiston shore light railway, can still be seen. A direct path from the village to the marsh on The Wash still exists.

=== Sea defence policy ===
In 2000 the process of land reclamation was reversed when part of the sea bank was deliberately breached, and the land behind opened to the tides as part of a policy of managed realignment. This took the pressure off the remaining sea defences with the aim of prolonging their life, while 66 hectares (0.7 km^{2}) of tidal salt marsh was re-established to help soak up wave energy, this acting as a further sea defence.

== Nature conservation ==
This new marsh, together with another, designed to be managed as a brackish marsh with lagoons, now forms Freiston Shore RSPB reserve. Freiston Shore is home to pied avocets, common redshanks, ringed plovers, northern wheatears and marsh harriers in spring and summer. In the autumn and winter migrating waders such as common redshanks, ruddy turnstones, dunlins, and waterfowl such as dark-bellied brent goose and Eurasian wigeon, can be seen.
