= List of areas depopulated due to climate change =

Impacted settlements resulting in climate migration

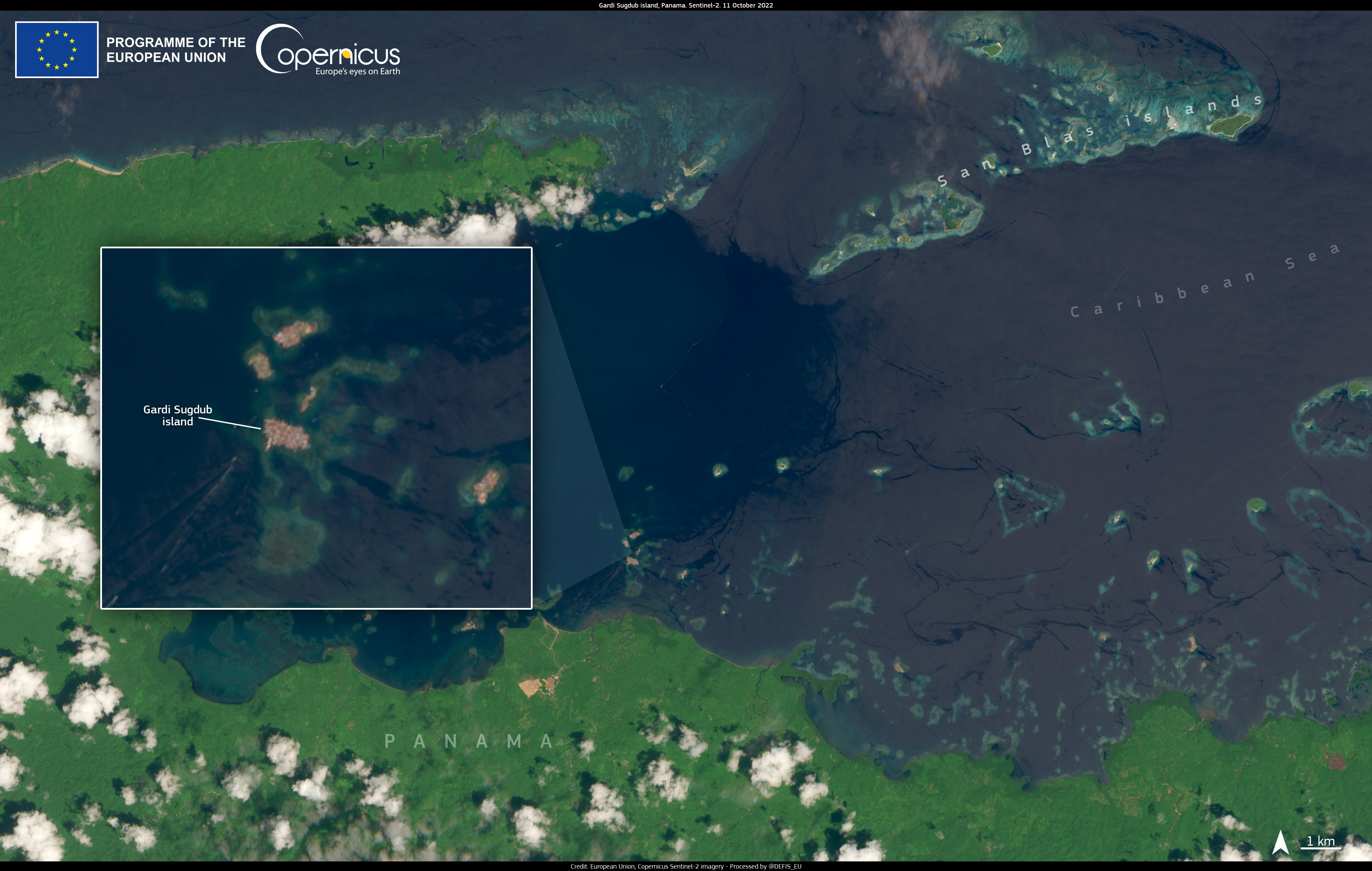
Satellite imaging of Cartí Sugtupu, Panama in 2022, showing rising sea levels submerging the island and forcing hundreds of indigenous Guna people to relocate.

This article lists several areas, regions, and municipalities that have either been completely or markedly depopulated, or are involved in plans for depopulation or relocation due to anthropogenic climate change. Several factors created or worsened by climate change can be responsible for necessitating managed retreat or the relocation of people and/or infrastructure. These include rising sea levels, increased flooding risk, changes to the makeup of the land (e.g. a habitable area becoming a wetland), coastal erosion, increased susceptibility to dangerous cyclones, droughts, water shortages, wildfires, and other factors, all of which can overlap with each other to enhance the risk of danger or inhabitability of a formerly populated region.

The lists contain a general number of the number of people moved or at risk of being moved due to climate change-related causes, as well as rough dates for when programs to relocate were first created or for when a climate disaster first caused significant forcible displacement of a population.

== Lists ==
=== Completely depopulated ===
Area	Location	Number impacted	Reasons for/details of depopulation	Date(s) started	References
Biloxi-Chitimacha-Choctaw community of Isle de Jean Charles, Louisiana	Louisiana, United States	~100	Saltwater intrusion and sea level rise, "the first migration of a total community in the state of Louisiana"	2016	
Cartí Sugtupu	San Blas Archipelago in the Guna Yala province of Panama	927	In the process of complete relocation due to rising sea levels. The first island in Panama to be displaced due to climate change.	2015	
A neighborhood of Željezno Polje	Žepče, Bosnia and Herzegovina	2,000+	Catastrophic flooding during the 2014 Balkan floods caused complete destruction and depopulation of a section of Željezno Polje, resulting in a "ghost neighborhood".	2014	
Vunidogoloa	Vanua Levu, Fiji	140	Original location became the first town in Fiji to be depopulated and relocated due to persistent flooding, saltwater intrusion, and coastal erosion, becoming a ghost town.	2004	
Tukuraki	Viti Levu, Fiji		Susceptibility to landslides and flooding from cyclones.	2017	
Nabavatu	Vanua Levu, Fiji	Nearly 400	Devastated by Cyclone Ana, depopulated due to its proximity to the coast and susceptibility to flooding and storm surge.	2021	
Sea Breeze, New Jersey	Cumberland County, New Jersey, United States	19	Increased flooding risk resulting in property owners collectively agreeing to sell their properties to the New Jersey Department of Environmental Protection.	2008	

=== Significantly impacted ===
Area	Location	Number impacted	Reasons for/details of depopulation	Date(s) started	References
Lake Chad Basin	Chad, Niger, Nigeria, and Cameroon	30,000,000	Droughts, floods, and the lake's contraction due to climate change, secondarily intensifying regional conflicts.		
Sudd region	South Sudan	1,000,000	Significant flooding increases and lack of drainage leading to permanent conversion of settlements and agricultural land into wetlands.	2017	
Sundarbans	Khulna Division, Bangladesh and West Bengal, India	Up to 70,000	Rising sea levels	2020	
Satabhaya, Odisha	Kendrapara district of Odisha, India	650 families	Rising sea levels and coastal erosion, requiring state relocation to Bagapatia.	2016	
Minqin County	Gansu Province, China	10,000	Water shortages	2007	
Xihaigu	Ningxia, China	Hundreds of thousands	Water shortages	1983	
Paradise, California	Sierra Nevada region of the United States	20,000+	Camp Fire, exacerbated by drought	2018	
Kivalina	Northwest Arctic, Alaska, United States	444	Sea level rise, flooding, sea wave erosion, and bank erosion impacting local water quality, resulting in a planned relocation 12 km (7.5 mi) from the present site.	2007	
Newtok	Bethel, Alaska, United States	209	Erosion due to melting permafrost and increasing flooding risk, requiring movement to Mertarvik.	2019	
Shaktoolik	Nome, Alaska, United States	212	Increasing flooding risk and erosion	2009	
Shishmaref	Nome, Alaska, United States	576	Increasing flooding risk from rising sea levels, erosion, and permafrost melting.	1987	
Quinault Indian Nation villages of Taholah and Queets	Washington's Olympic Peninsula, United States	660	Susceptibility to flooding and landslides due to rising sea levels, resulting in planned relocation to higher ground.	2014	
Domaljevac-Šamac	Posavina, Bosnia and Herzegovina	1,000+	Repeated flooding; considered the first permanent climate migration in Europe along with other areas impacted by the 2014 Balkan floods	2014	
Kopanice	Posavina, Bosnia and Herzegovina	280	Repeated flooding, 15-20% of population permanently left after the 2014 Balkan floods	2014	
Orašje	Posavina, Bosnia and Herzegovina	19,861	Repeated flooding, about 50% of the working age population left the city after the 2014 Balkan floods	2014	
Cotul Morii	Hîncești District, Moldova	440 families	Ordered by the government to be relocated 15 km away from its original location due to significant flooding. Officially abandoned by state decree, although 60 families returned despite there being no running electricity or water.	2010	
Fairbourne	Wales, United Kingdom	400 homes	Rising sea levels and erosion, planned managed retreat to completely abandoned by 2055.	2010	
Saint-Louis	Senegal	254,171	Sea level rise and susceptibility to flooding and storm surge, where up to 80% of its area could be flooded by 2080.		
La Push, Washington	United States	371	Rising sea levels leading to greater susceptibility to flooding and tsunamis, resulting in the community moving the buildings in the village to higher ground.	2017	
Money Island, New Jersey	Cumberland County, New Jersey	20+	Sea level rise and Hurricane Sandy, resulting in state buyback of properties to convert into wildlife sanctuaries.	2012	
Oakwood Beach	Oakwood, New York		Susceptibility to sea level rise and flooding due to low elevation, resulting in state property buyback programs following significant damage during Hurricane Sandy.	2012	
Nuatambu	Solomon Islands	34 families	Severe erosion and rising sea levels submerging half of its settlements.	2011	
Tuvalu	Oceania	11,000	Sea level rise, resulting in resettlement plans and agreements with Australia to enable climate-related mobility for its citizens	2023	
West Auckland	Auckland, New Zealand	319,566	Rising sea levels leading to extensive flooding, resulting in relocation and government property buybacks.	2023	
Westport	West Coast, New Zealand	4,250	Rising sea levels leading to extensive flooding, resulting in relocation and government property buybacks.	2023	
South Dunedin	Dunedin, New Zealand	2,500	Rising sea levels leading to extensive flooding, resulting in relocation and government property buybacks.	2023	
Southshore	Christchurch, New Zealand	1,041	Rising sea levels leading to extensive flooding, resulting in relocation and government property buybacks.	2023	
Petone	Lower Hutt, New Zealand	8,330	Rising sea levels leading to extensive flooding, resulting in relocation and government property buybacks.	2023	
Whakatāne	Bay of Plenty Region, New Zealand	16,850	Rising sea levels leading to extensive flooding, resulting in relocation and government property buybacks for certain regions of the town.	2023	
Whanganui	Manawatū-Whanganui, New Zealand	48,900	Rising sea levels leading to extensive flooding, resulting in relocation and government property buybacks for certain regions of the city.	2023	
Whangārei	Northland, New Zealand	56,900	Rising sea levels leading to extensive flooding, resulting in relocation and government property buybacks for certain regions of the city.	2023	
Esk Valley	Hawke Bay, New Zealand	236 households	Rising sea levels leading to extensive flooding, resulting in relocation and government property buybacks following Cyclone Gabrielle.	2023	
Ebro Delta	Province of Tarragona, Catalonia, Spain	50,000	Rising sea levels triggering managed retreat plans for areas closest to the sea.	2009	
Holderness	East Riding of Yorkshire, England, United Kingdom	11,993	Highest rate of coastal erosion in Europe due to its soft soil and rising sea levels.		
Hunstanton	Norfolk, England, United Kingdom	4,229	Severe coastal erosion due to rising sea levels, requiring managed retreat.	1996	
Wells-next-the-Sea	Norfolk, England, United Kingdom	2,165	Severe coastal erosion due to rising sea levels, requiring managed retreat.	1996	
Blakeney	Norfolk, England, United Kingdom	801	Severe coastal erosion due to rising sea levels, requiring managed retreat.	1996	
Sheringham	Norfolk, England, United Kingdom	7,367	Severe coastal erosion due to rising sea levels, requiring managed retreat.	1996	
Cromer	Norfolk, England, United Kingdom	7,683	Severe coastal erosion due to rising sea levels, requiring managed retreat.	1996	
Mundesley	Norfolk, England, United Kingdom	2,758	Severe coastal erosion due to rising sea levels, requiring managed retreat.	1996	

== Gallery ==
Pictures of regions depopulated or susceptible to depopulation due to climate change-related factors
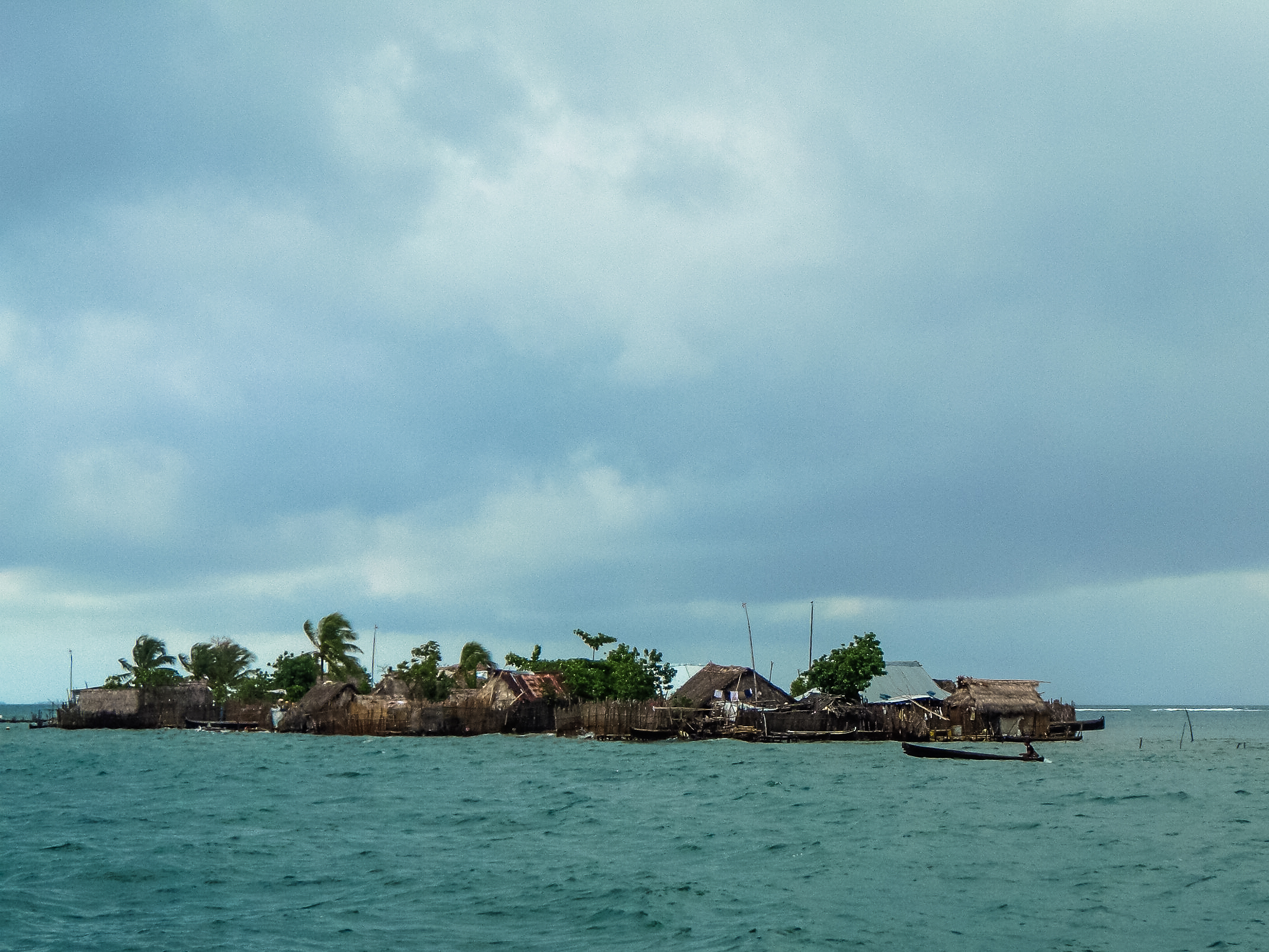
Cartí Sugtupu, Panama

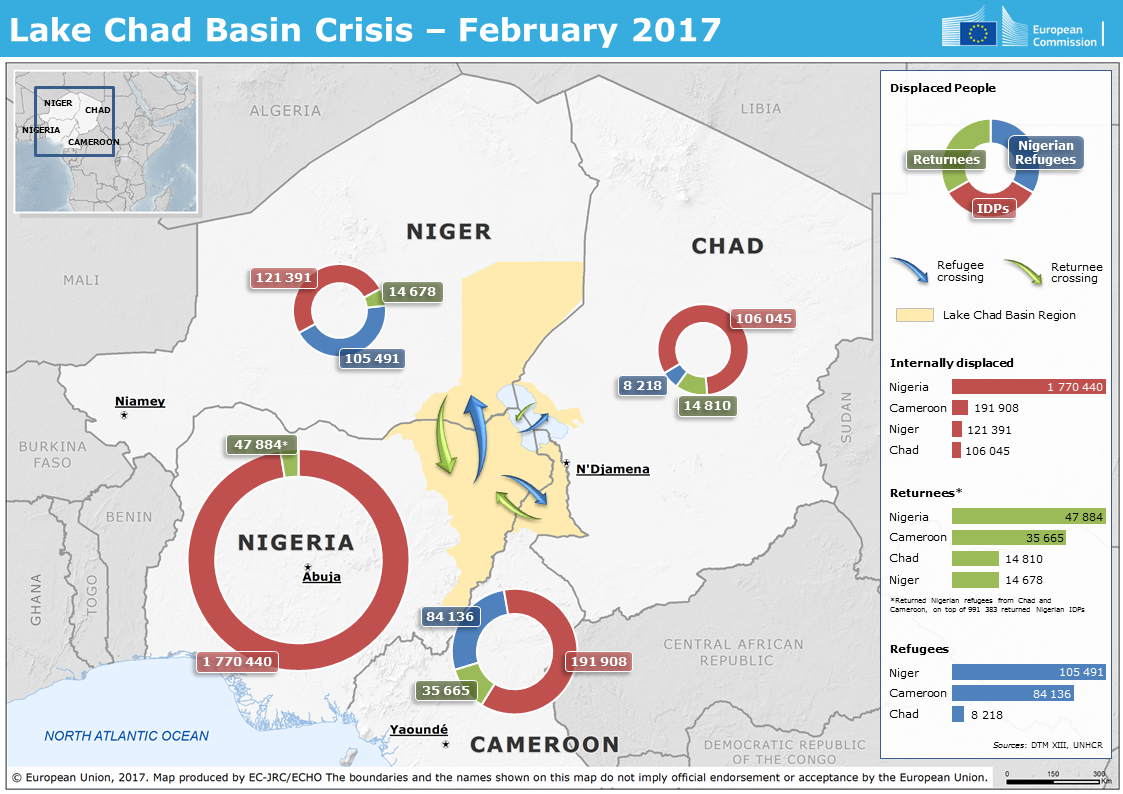
Displacement of people from Lake Chad Basin in 2017

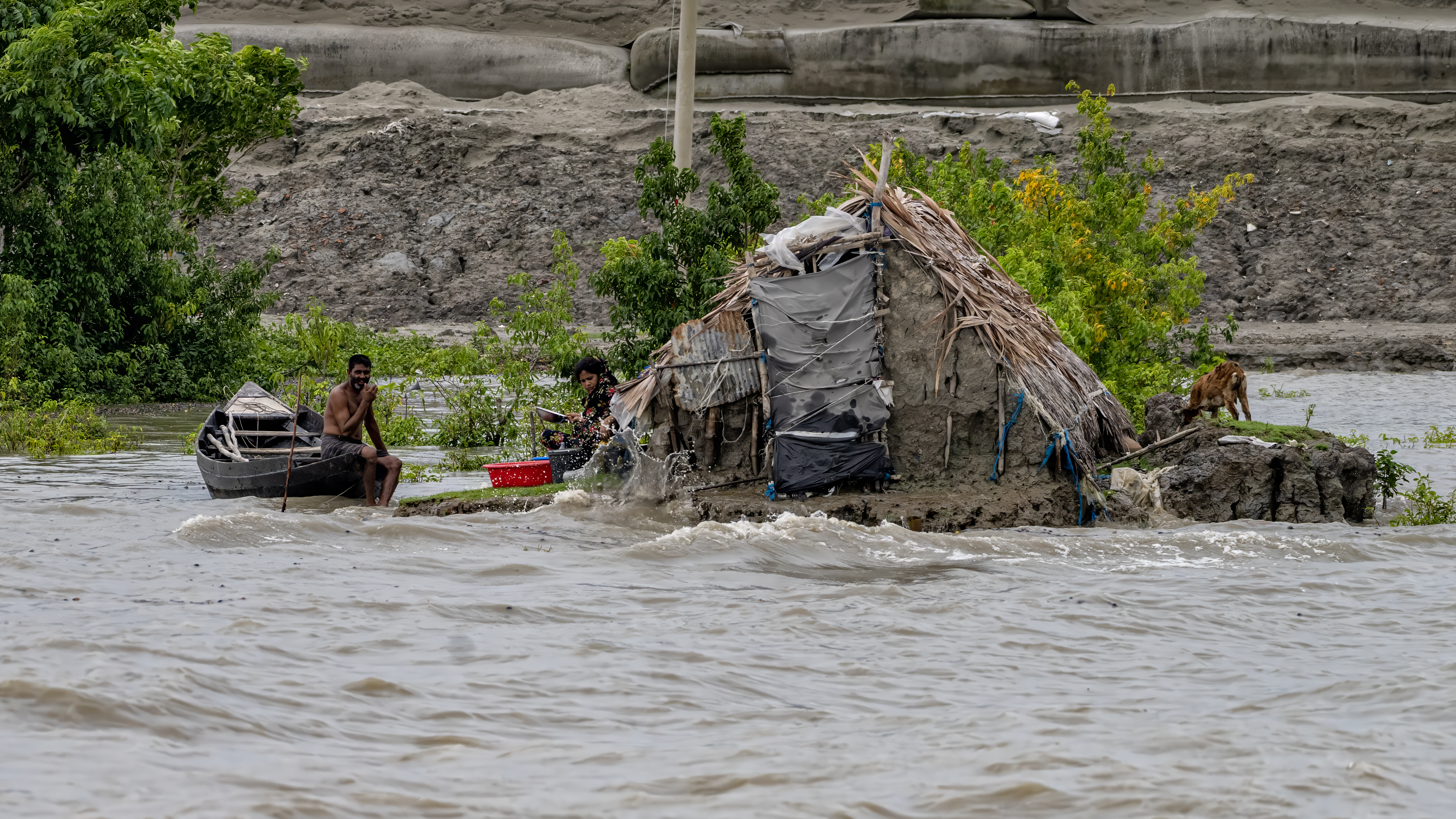
A mud house in Mongla of Bagerhat district, Bangladesh, nearly inundated by rising water levels.

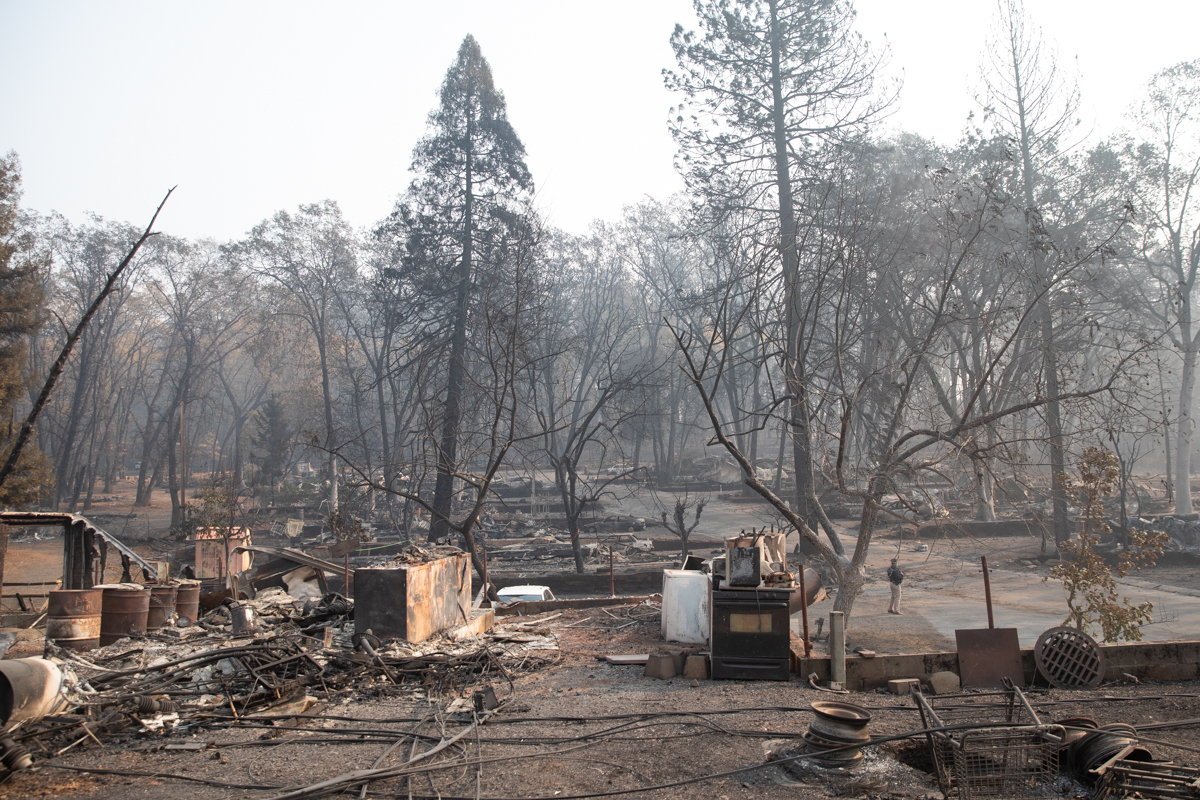
Destruction in Paradise, California, caused by the Camp Fire in 2018.

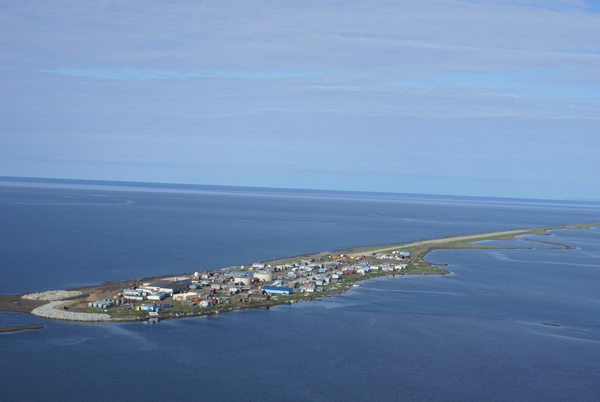
Kivalina, Alaska

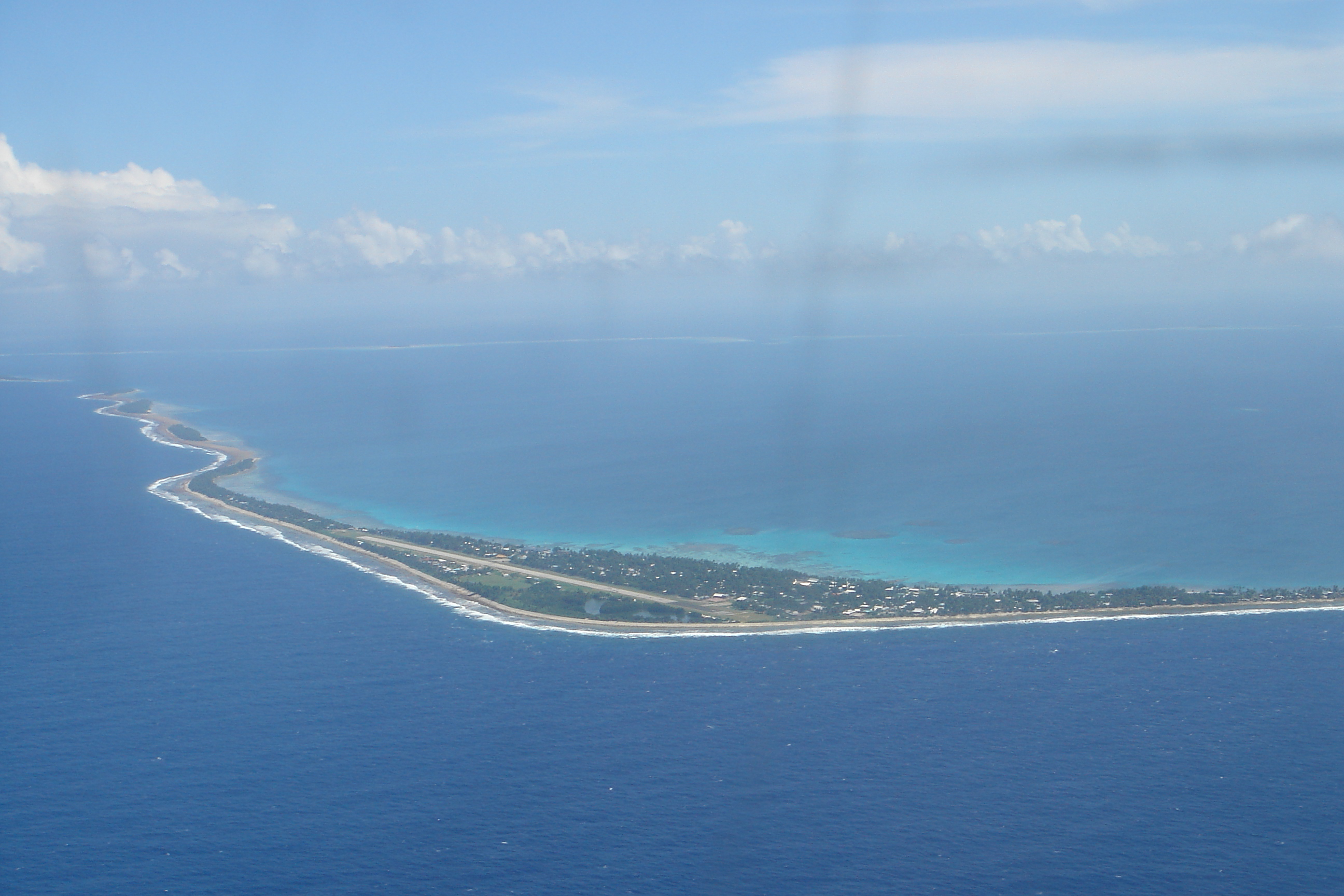
Tuvalu, Funafuti Atoll

== See also ==
- Climate migration
- Environmental migrant
- Extreme event attribution
- Space and survival
- Great Filter
- Managed retreat
- List of landmarks destroyed or damaged by climate change
