= Managed retreat =

Coordinated movement of people and buildings away from risks

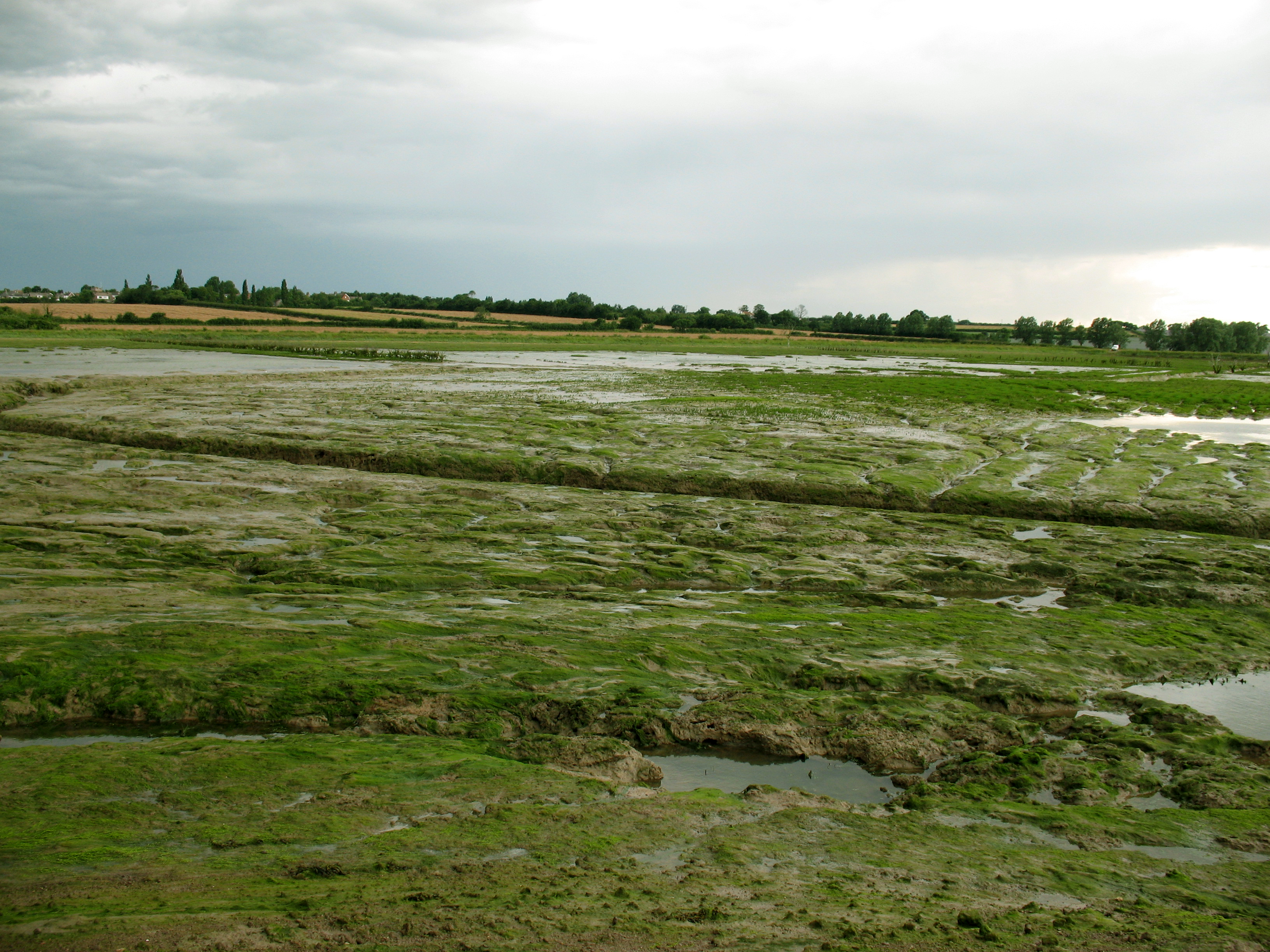
Tollesbury Managed Realignment site in Essex, the first large-scale attempt at salt-marsh restoration in the UK

Managed retreat involves the purposeful, coordinated movement of people and buildings away from risks. This may involve the movement of a person, infrastructure (e.g., building or road), or community. It can occur in response to a variety of hazards such as flood, wildfire, or drought. Politicians, insurers, and residents are increasingly paying attention to managed retreat from low-lying coastal areas because of the threat of sea level rise due to climate change. Trends in climate change predict substantial sea level rises worldwide, causing damage to human infrastructure through coastal erosion and putting communities at risk of severe coastal flooding.

Climate change adaptation strategies to reduce risks from sea level rise for coastal communities: ➀ no response; ② advanced protection; ③ adjustment; ④ advancement; ⑤ strategic retreat; ⑥ ecosystem-based adaptation.

The type of managed retreat proposed depends on the location and type of natural hazard, and on local policies and practices for managed retreat. In the United Kingdom, managed realignment through removal of flood defences is often a response to sea-level rise exacerbated by local subsidence. In the United States, managed retreat often occurs through voluntary acquisition and demolition or relocation of at-risk properties by government. In the Global South, relocation may occur through government programs. Some low-lying countries, facing inundation due to sea-level rise, are planning for the relocation of their populations, such as Kiribati planning for "Migration with Dignity".

== Managed realignment ==
In the United Kingdom, the main reason for managed realignment is to improve coastal stability, essentially replacing artificial 'hard' coastal defences with natural 'soft' coastal landforms. According to University of Southampton researchers Matthew M. Linham and Robert J. Nicholls, "one of the biggest drawbacks of managed realignment is that the option requires land to be yielded to the sea." One of its benefits is that it can help protect land further inland by creating natural spaces that act as buffers to absorb water or dampen the force of waves.

Managed realignment has also been used to mitigate for loss of intertidal habitat. Although land reclamation has been an important factor for salt marsh loss in the UK in the past, the majority of current salt marsh loss in the UK is believed to be due to erosion. This erosion may involve coastal squeeze, where protective sea walls prevent the landward migration of salt marsh in response to sea level rise when sediment supply is limited. Salt marshes are protected under the EU Habitats Directive as well as providing habitat for a number of species protected by the Birds Directive (see Natura 2000). Following this guidance, the UK's biodiversity action plan aims to prevent net losses to the area of salt marsh present in 1992. It is, therefore, a legal requirement that all losses in marsh area must be compensated by replacement habitat with equivalent biological characteristics. This equates to the need to restore approximately 1.4 km^{2} of salt marsh habitat per year in the UK. One of the major reasons cited for the slow pace of current salt marsh restoration in the UK is the uncertainty associated with the practice (Foresight).

There are no agreed protocols on the monitoring of managed realignment sites and, consequently, very few of the sites are being monitored consistently and effectively. Due to the low levels of monitoring, there is little evidence on which to base future managed realignment projects. This has led to the results of managed realignment schemes being extremely unpredictable.

== Relocation programs ==
Managed retreat in the form of relocation has been used in inland and coastal areas in response to severe flooding and hurricanes. In the United States, this often takes the form of "buyout" programs, in which government acquires and relocates or demolishes at-risk properties. In some cases, individual homes are purchased after disasters. In other cases, such as Odanah and Soldiers Grove, Wisconsin, or Valmeyer, Illinois, or Isle de Jean Charles, Louisiana the entire community has relocated.

Managed retreat can be very controversial. A lawsuit in Del Mar California brought on by residents was initiated to stop a managed retreat program based on worries that home values, insurance costs and restricted home expansion have been effects of the policy. Some areas included in managed retreat are above sea level and are recommended based primarily on estimated engineering costs and by studies financed by the California Coastal Commission itself.

Despite the controversy, as the costs of climate change adaptation increase, more communities are beginning to consider managed retreat. One such community is Marina, California, adjacent to Monterey Bay. Marina's general acceptance of managed retreat became the subject of a Los Angeles Times feature article, published in 2020.

== Realignment examples ==
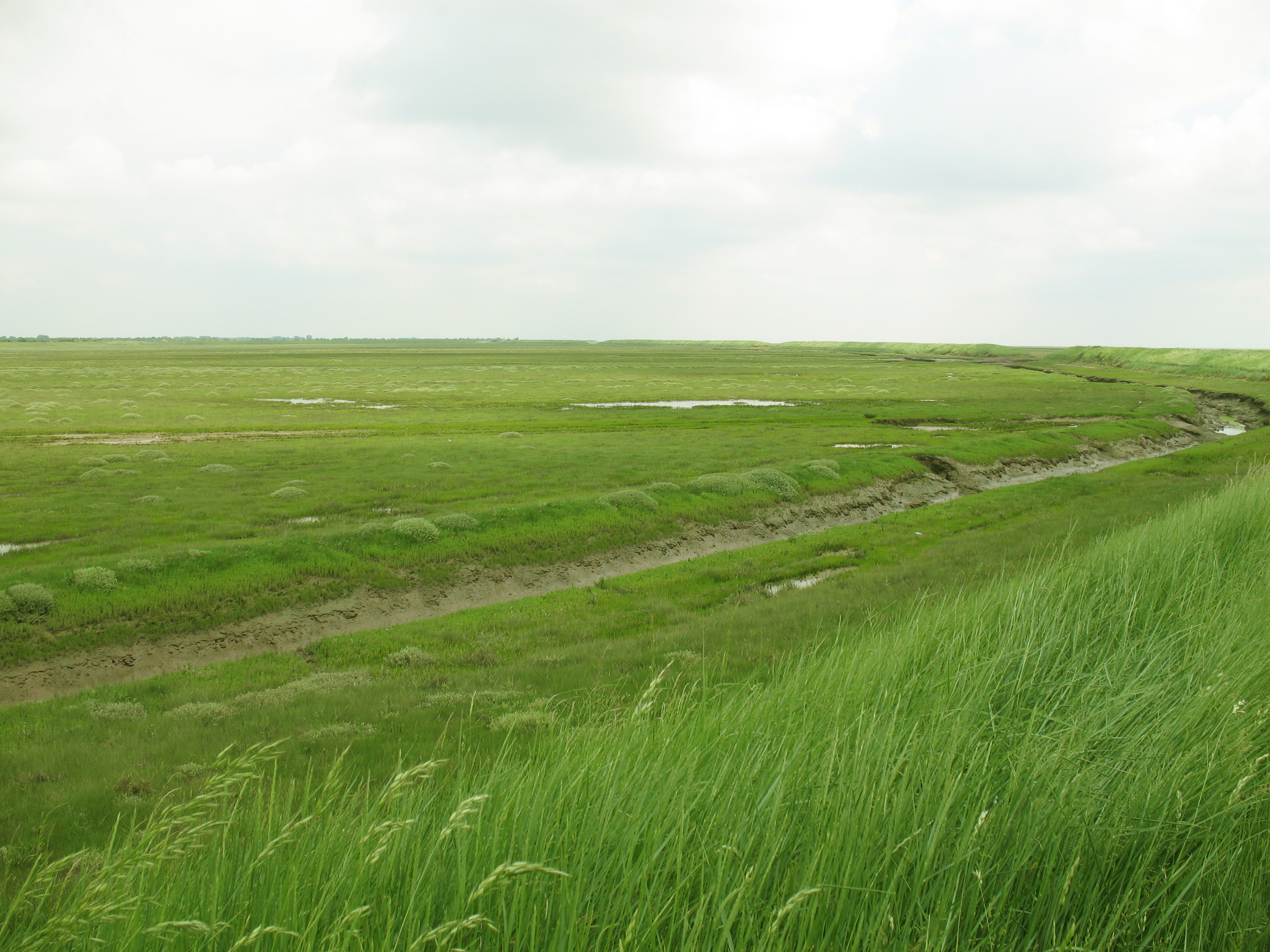
Freiston Shore Managed Realignment site, Lincolnshire

In the UK, the first managed retreat site was an area of 8,000 square metres (86,000 sq ft) at Northey Island in Essex flooded in 1991, followed by larger sites at Tollesbury and Orplands (1995), Freiston Shore (2001) and Abbott's Hall Farm, at Great Wigborough in the Blackwater Estuary, it is one of the largest managed retreat schemes in Europe. It covers nearly 280 hectares (690 acres) of land on the north side of the estuary (2002) and a number of others. The programme was started by the Essex Wildlife Trust (EWT) who own Abbott's Hall Farm. They made five breaches in the original old sea wall to allow the sea to flood through to create salt marshland. The marshland over time reverted to its original state before cultivation, providing excellent bird habitat and breeding grounds.

== Forced retreat under climate change ==
Since 2010, the New Zealand Coastal Policy Statement, a policy under the Resource Management Act of 1991, has required the government to conduct managed retreats.

As a result of two climate change related landslides in New Zealand in 2005, the Whakatane District Council began to plan for climate-related migration to the Matatā township over the next decade. The vast majority of residents accepted the need to relocate and did so with council assistance and compensation but as of October 2021, one resident has rejected both the process and the need to move and is now the neighbourhood's sole remaining occupant. NIWA coastal hazards expert Rob Bell says the issue of retreat is primarily socio-political rather than technocratic.

== See also ==
- Restoration ecology – Scientific study of renewing and restoring ecosystems
- Environmental migrant – People who leave a region because of a changing environment (an involuntary, forced case)
- Space and survival – Idea that spacefaring is necessary for long-term human survival (a hypothetical extreme case in science fiction)
- List of areas depopulated due to climate change – Impacted settlements resulting in climate migration
