= Ruck machine gun post =

Type of hardened field fortification

- Deployed in Lincolnshire and along the east coast of England
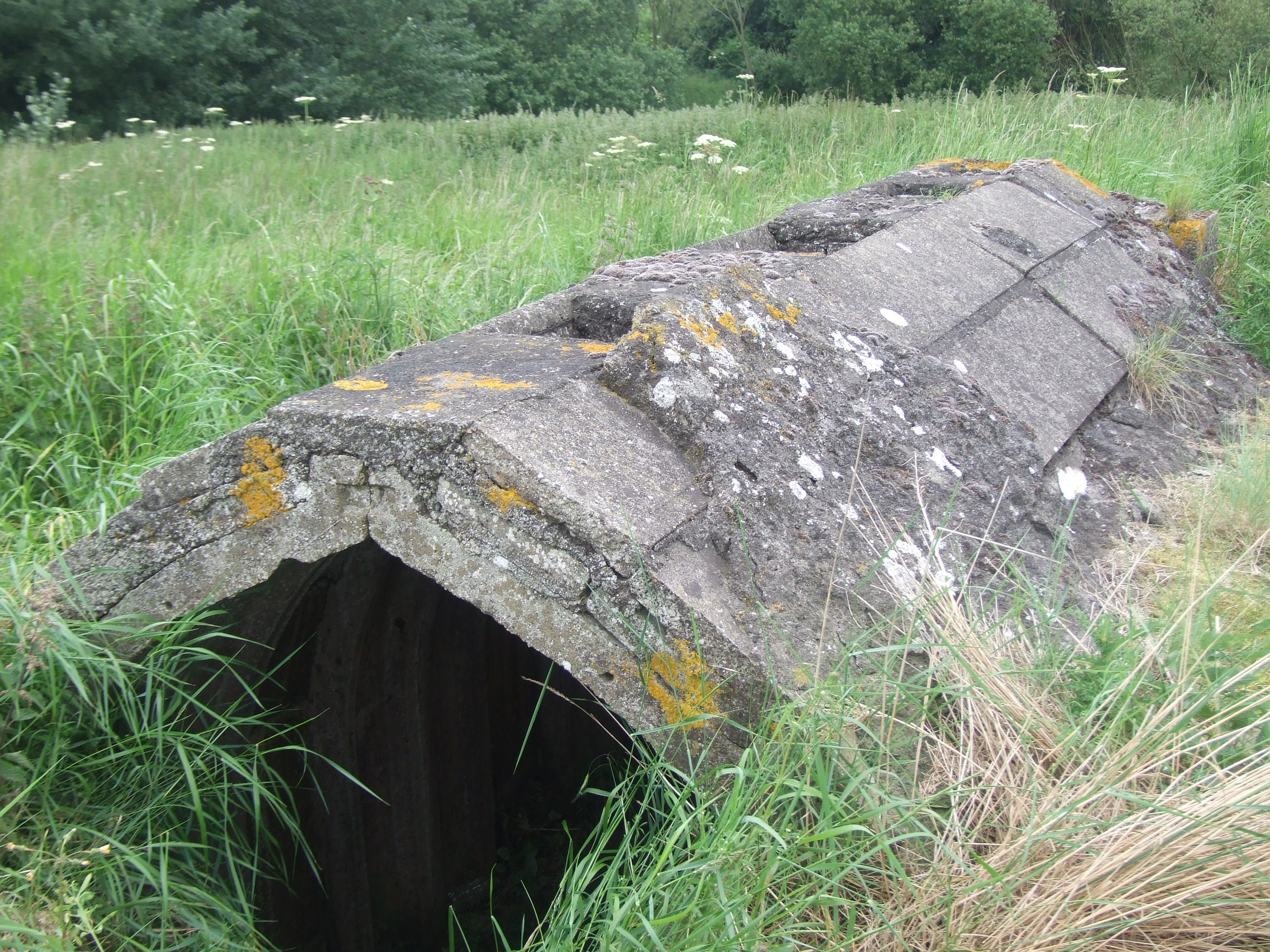
- Extant example at Lawyers' Creek, Holbeach. OS reference TF4002333744. Horizontal embrasures on one side have become partially buried and completely overgrown. Note vertical embrasures.

Site information
- Type: Pillbox

Site history
- In use: Second World War
- Materials: Concrete

The Ruck machine gun post or Ruck pillbox is a type of hardened field fortification built in Britain during the invasion crisis of 1940–1941. It was designed by James Ruck and was made from prefabricated concrete sections and paving slabs, sandbags and rammed earth. The Ruck machine gun post was relatively widely used in Lincolnshire and along the east coast of England, but is now extremely rare with just a handful of extant examples. Today, just five Ruck machine gun post sites are recorded in the Defence of Britain database.

== Design ==
James Ruck was the north midlands regional works adviser to the Ministry of Home Security. His principal duties related to the provision of air-raid shelters. In June 1940, he offered the military a design for a machine gun post:

I propose they be constructed of hollow concrete blocks filled with the earth excavated from the site, roofed with precast concrete beams and paving stone flags; walls 18" thick, spaces being left in each side so that fire can be operated in any direction; a portion of the roof could also be adjustable for firing overhead.

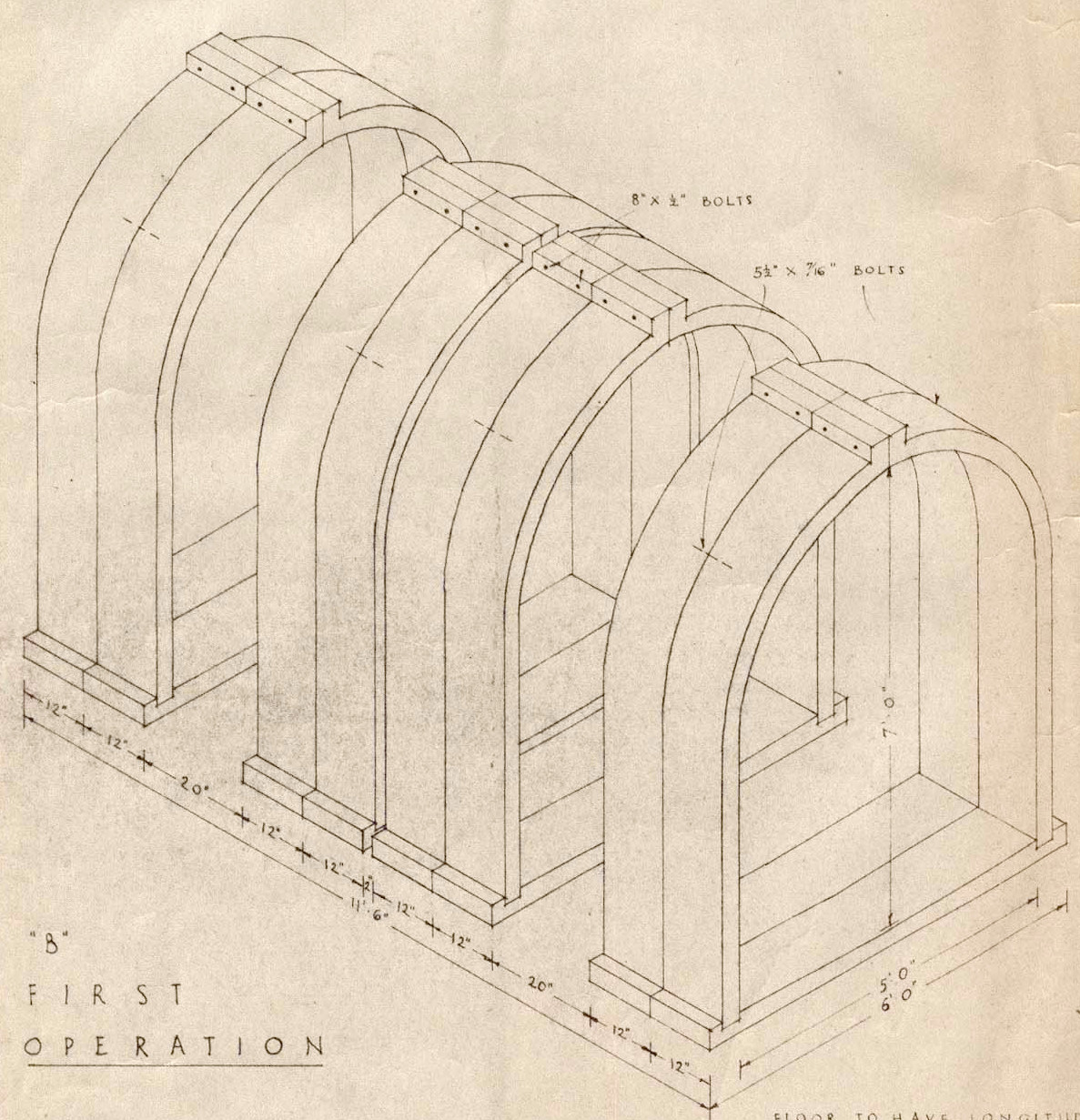
The first operation is to put up arches with gaps where the embrasures will be

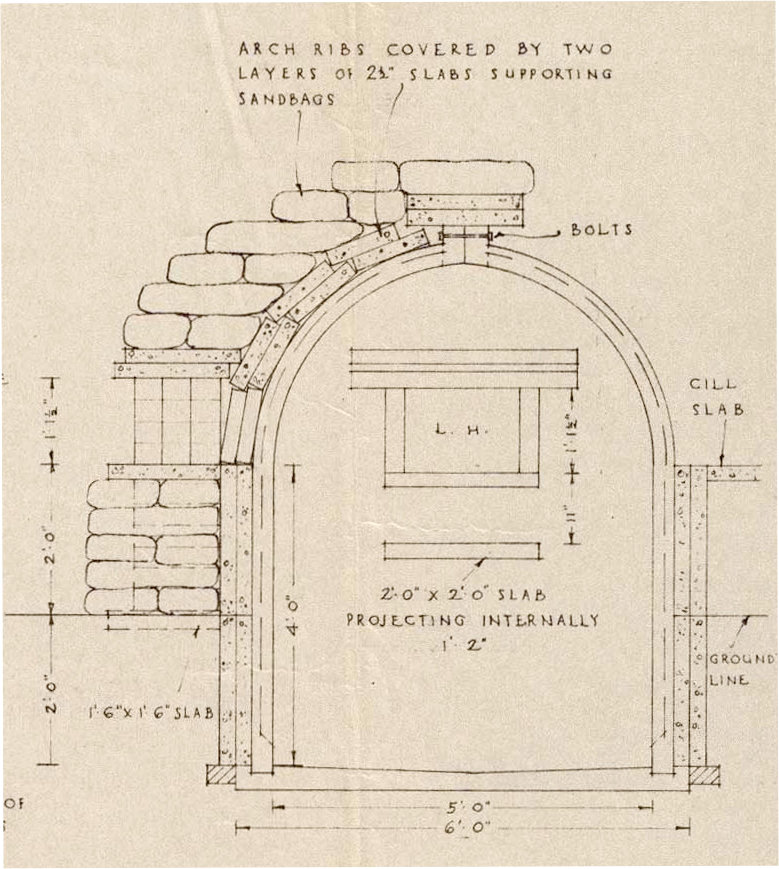
Protection built up with concrete paving slabs, mortar and sandbags.

Ruck machine gun post - construction.

Ruck's design was based on precast half-arch concrete sections produced by Hydroprest Concrete Ltd at Scunthorpe. Four 12-inch (30.5 cm) sections formed an arch with inside dimensions 5 ft (1.5 m) wide, 7 ft (2.1 m) high and 2 ft (61 cm) long. Any number of the arches could be assembled together to form a structure of a desired length, but for Ruck's design 20-inch gaps between the arches would be left to serve as embrasures, with an inside length of 12 ft (3.7 m). The arches were clad with two layers of mortar and concrete paving slabs; this filled in the gaps except where an embrasure was required and gave a wall thickness that varied between 6 and 9 inches (15 and 23 cm). The ends were walled up with hollow concrete blocks filled with bricks; the wall at one end had an embrasure, the other end had an entrance. The concrete offered only limited protection, so the structure would be partly buried and then surrounded by an outer wall of sandbags to the level of the embrasures and the gap between the wall and the concrete filled with rammed earth.

According to Ruck, who enthusiastically promoted his design, the principal advantages of the machine gun post were that it could be quickly constructed by unskilled labour and made economical use of materials. The precast components could be produced at the rate of 70 posts per day and Ruck claimed that six unskilled men could complete three precast units in a day. Ruck also emphasised that his design made use of "some hundreds of thousands of tons of this material lying in stocks in makers yards throughout the country requiring no fresh drain on cement or steel". Ruck estimated the cost of a post to be just £40 [equivalent to £1,900 in 2025].

== Construction ==
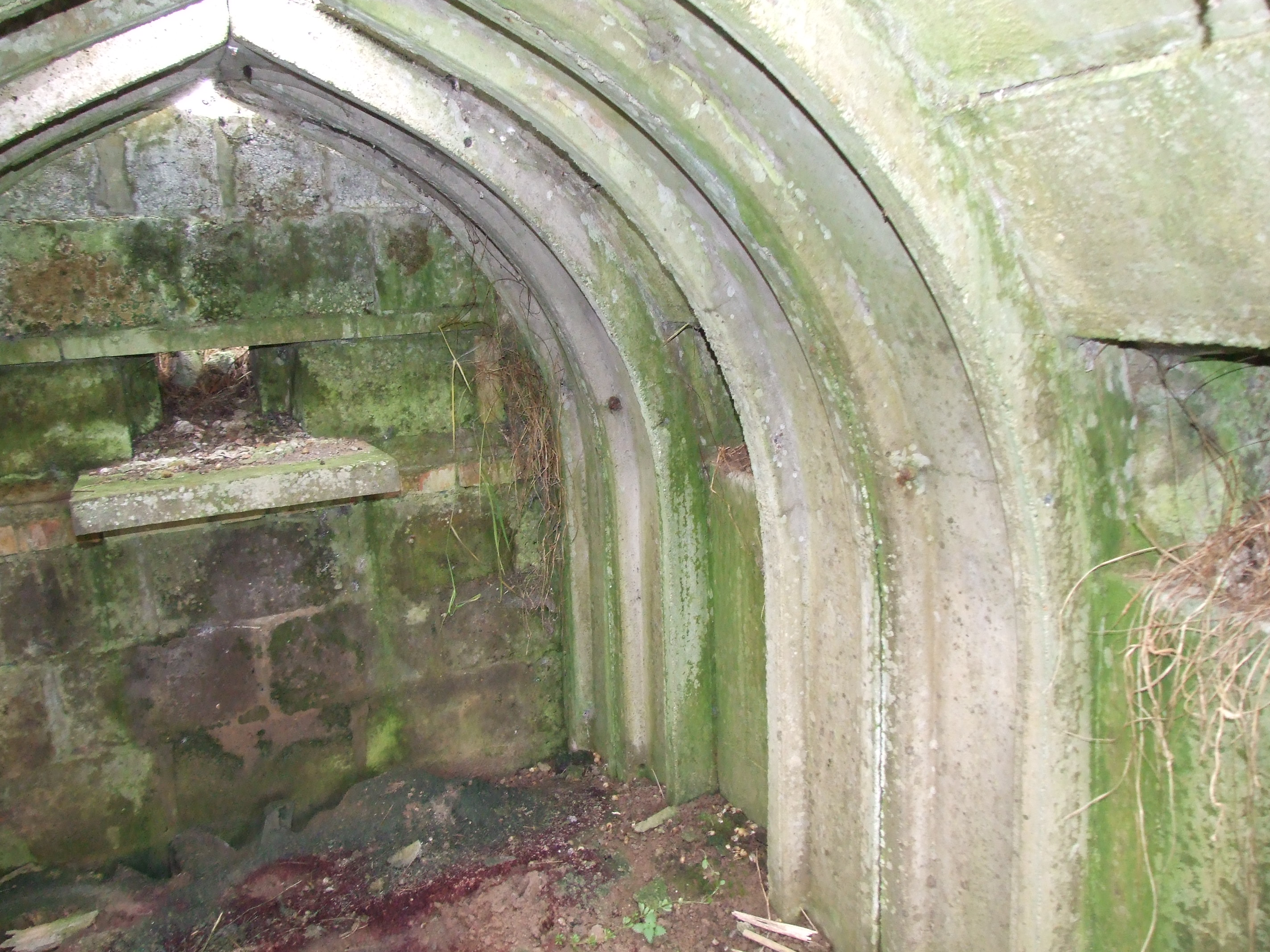
Interior, showing end wall.

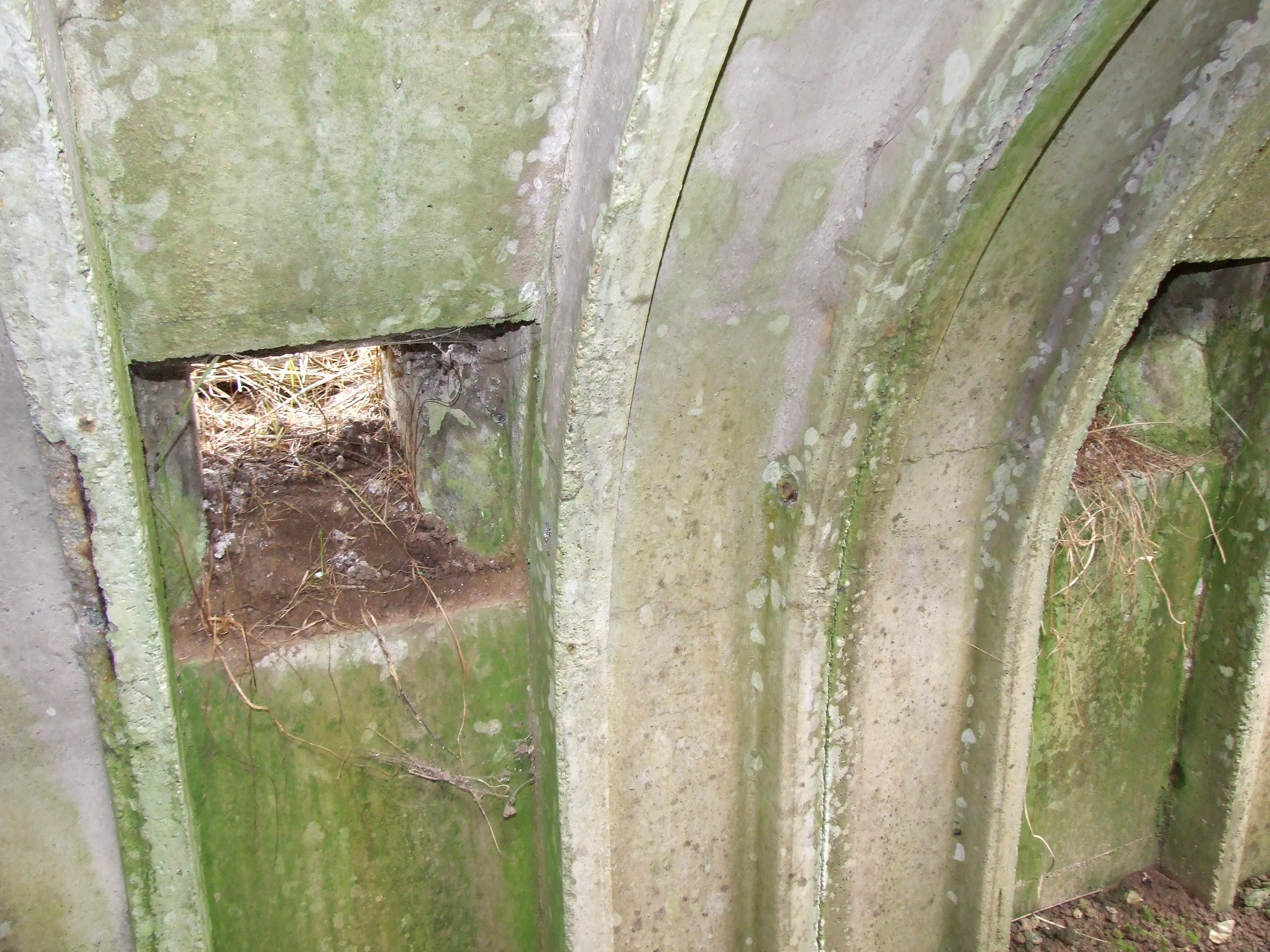
Horizontal embrassure

Ruck machine gun post.

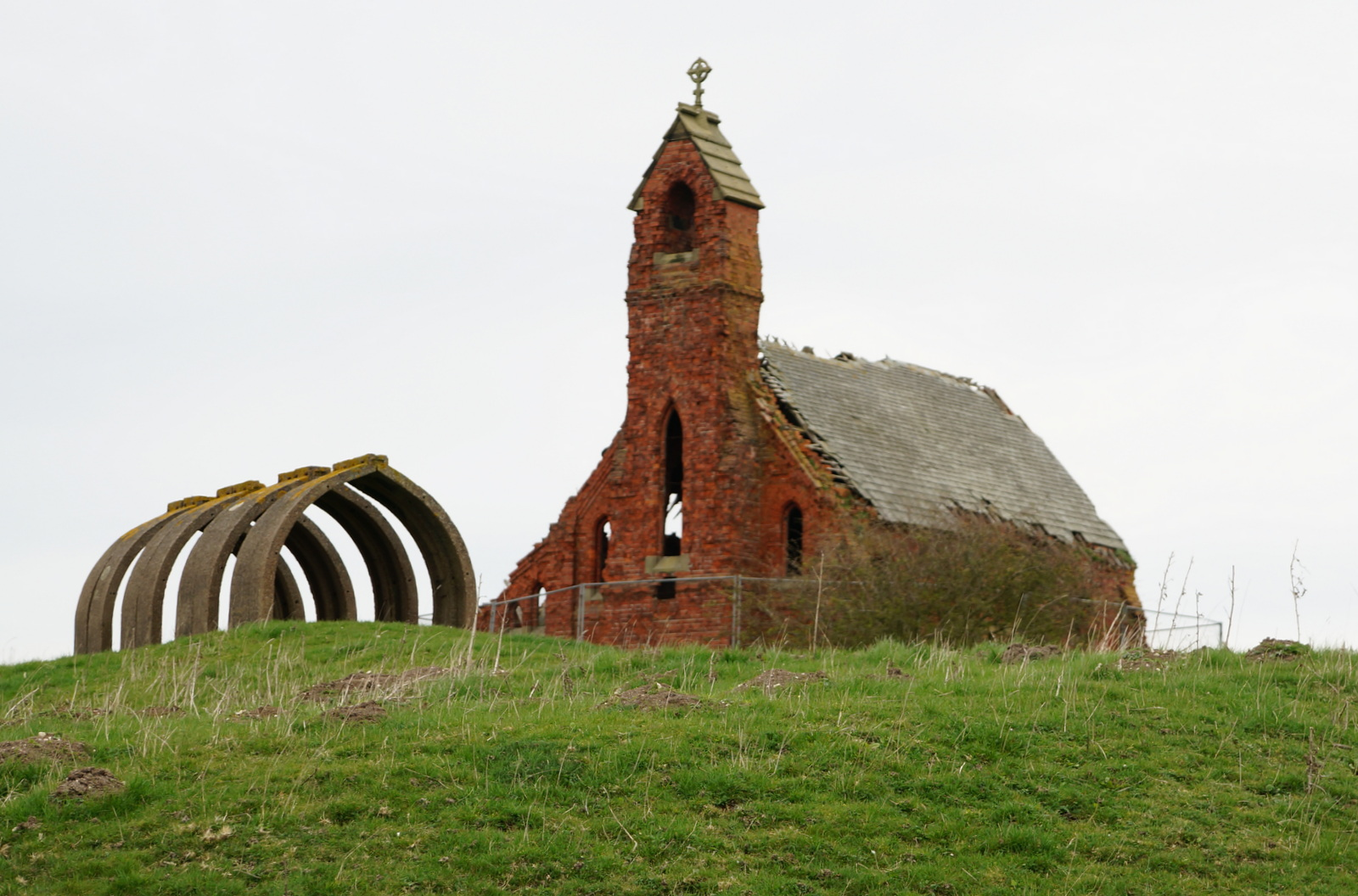
Ruck machine gun post by the ruined Chapel at Cottam

In July 1940, instructions were issued for the order of 1,600 posts, by September 1940 some 4,000 posts had been constructed and there were orders for a further 2,000.

Today, the Ruck machine gun post presents something of a mystery. Despite the substantial numbers constructed, traces of them are rare – just 5 were recorded by the Defence of Britain project. Of all the pillbox designs, the Ruck machine gun post is one of the most readily disassembled and this may have been the fate of many of these posts. Because the post had to be partially buried, it was best employed on rising ground; it may be that many were deployed in soft cliffs and dunes along an ever-changing coastline and have been lost to erosion. Finally, there may be extant examples that are simply unrecognised for what they are. Potentially a sixth ruck pillbox exists, it found in a field along the Louth canal however this structure is not officially recorded by the extended defence of Britain project as of 2026.

== See also ==
- British anti-invasion preparations of World War II
- British hardened field defences of World War II
