= Satabhaya, Odisha =

Coordinates: 20°38′N 86°56′E

Satabhaya is a village and a beach located on the coastal side of Kendrapara District in Odisha, India. prone to natural calamities like the deposition of sand dunes causing great havoc to the inhabitants since time immemorial. There is not even a cyclone-warning centre at this site. The village is at present surrounded by seawater, and the villagers are planning to migrate to a safer place.

The place is very near Bhitarkanika mangrove forests and, also the Gahirmatha Beach which is the largest nesting ground for Olive Ridley Turtles.
