= St Mary's Church, Sheriffhales =

Anglican church in Shropshire, England

Coordinates: 52.7055397°N 2.3598522°W

- Church of St Mary the Virgin, Sheriffhales
- The church at Hales.
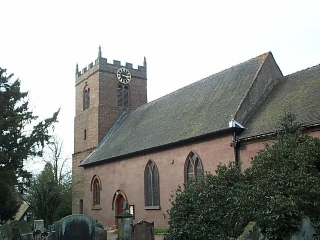
- St Mary's church seen from the south-east

- Position within Shropshire
- OS grid reference: SJ 75802 12032
- Location: Shropshire
- Country: England
- Denomination: Church of England
- Website: Sheriffhales at A Church Near You

History
- Status: Parish church
- Founded: By 1081
- Founder(s): Uncertain: possibly Warin the Bald, first Sheriff of Shropshire
- Dedication: St Mary

Architecture
- Functional status: Active
- Heritage designation: Grade II Listed
- Designated: 26 May 1955
- Style: Gothic
- Years built: 12th and 14th centuries, with extension and refacing in 17th and 18th centuries and Victorian restoration 1884.

Specifications
- Materials: Sandstone

Administration
- Province: Canterbury
- Diocese: Lichfield
- Archdeaconry: Salop
- Deanery: Edgmond and Shifnal
- Parish: Sheriffhales (Benefice of Shifnal, Sheriffhales and Tong)

Clergy
- Vicar: Vacancy. Reverend Christopher Thorpe retired July 2026.

Listed Building – Grade II
- Designated: 26 May 1955
- Reference no.: 1053645

The Church of St Mary, Sheriffhales, is a Church of England place of worship in the village of Sheriffhales, near the eastern edge of Shropshire, although for most of its history the parish was mainly in Staffordshire, with a small portion in Shropshire.

The history of the church goes back at least to the Norman period — possibly into Anglo-Saxon times. For more than three centuries it belonged to the Abbey of Saint-Evroul, an important monastery in the Pays d'Ouche region of south-east Normandy, before Henry V transferred it to Sheen Priory. The early modern period, from the Reformation to the English Civil War and Commonwealth, brought rapid change and turbulence, with a less eventful period after the Restoration

The fabric of the building dates from several periods, with some going back to the High Middle Ages, although much was constructed from 1661 as part of a major extension and improvement. There was Victorian restoration as well as further refurbishment in the 20th century. The overall appearance remains that of a square-towered, sandstone church, typical of its region.

== Middle Ages ==
=== Origins ===
There is some doubt about the precise origins of the church in Sheriffhales. Arthur Tompson Michell, the vicar who edited the parish register for publication in 1908, referred to a belief that the church was originally dependent on the church at Shifnal but dismissed it as being "on slender grounds." However the Valor Ecclesiasticus of 1535 reported that the vicar of Shifnal was still at that time drawing an annual pension of five shillings from Sheriffhales and made clear that it would continue to his successors, implying that it was paid by virtue of his office. This makes it plausible that Sheriffhales church began as a chapel dependent on the collegiate church at Shifnal in the Anglo-Saxon period. Shifnal evidently suffered an economic disaster after the Norman Conquest, which the noted Shropshire historian Robert William Eyton attributed to the upheaval caused by the revolt of Earl Morcar, the last Anglo-Saxon landholder. Its value reached a nadir at just six shillings around 1071. Robert Fitz-Tetbald took control and restored Shifnal's fortunes, so that it was worth 15 pounds in Domesday in 1086, but the church's collegiate status was lost during the recovery period, and it was gifted to Shrewsbury Abbey, with the proviso that it should pass finally only as the canons died off. Eyton assumes the existence Sheriffhales chapel among the Anglo-Saxon dependents of Shifnal church that became detached after the Conquest The disagreement between Michell and Eyton is probably not resolvable.

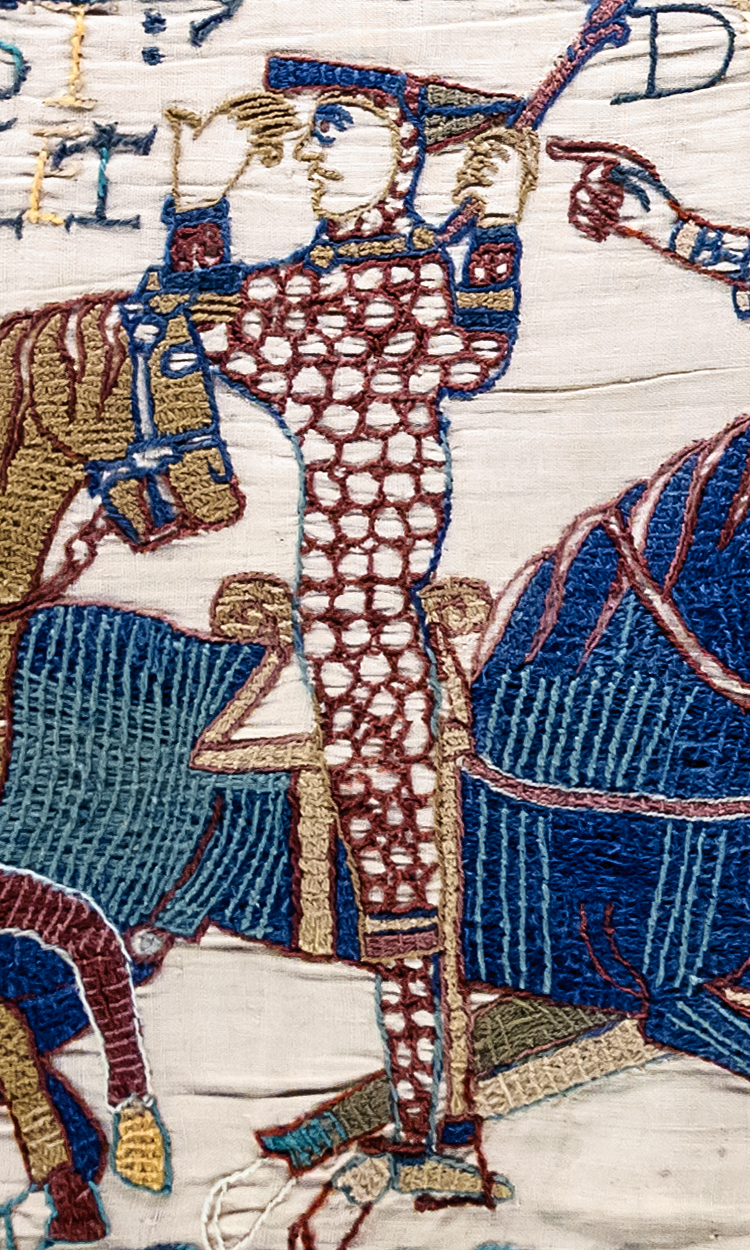
William the Conqueror as depicted in the Bayeux Tapestry

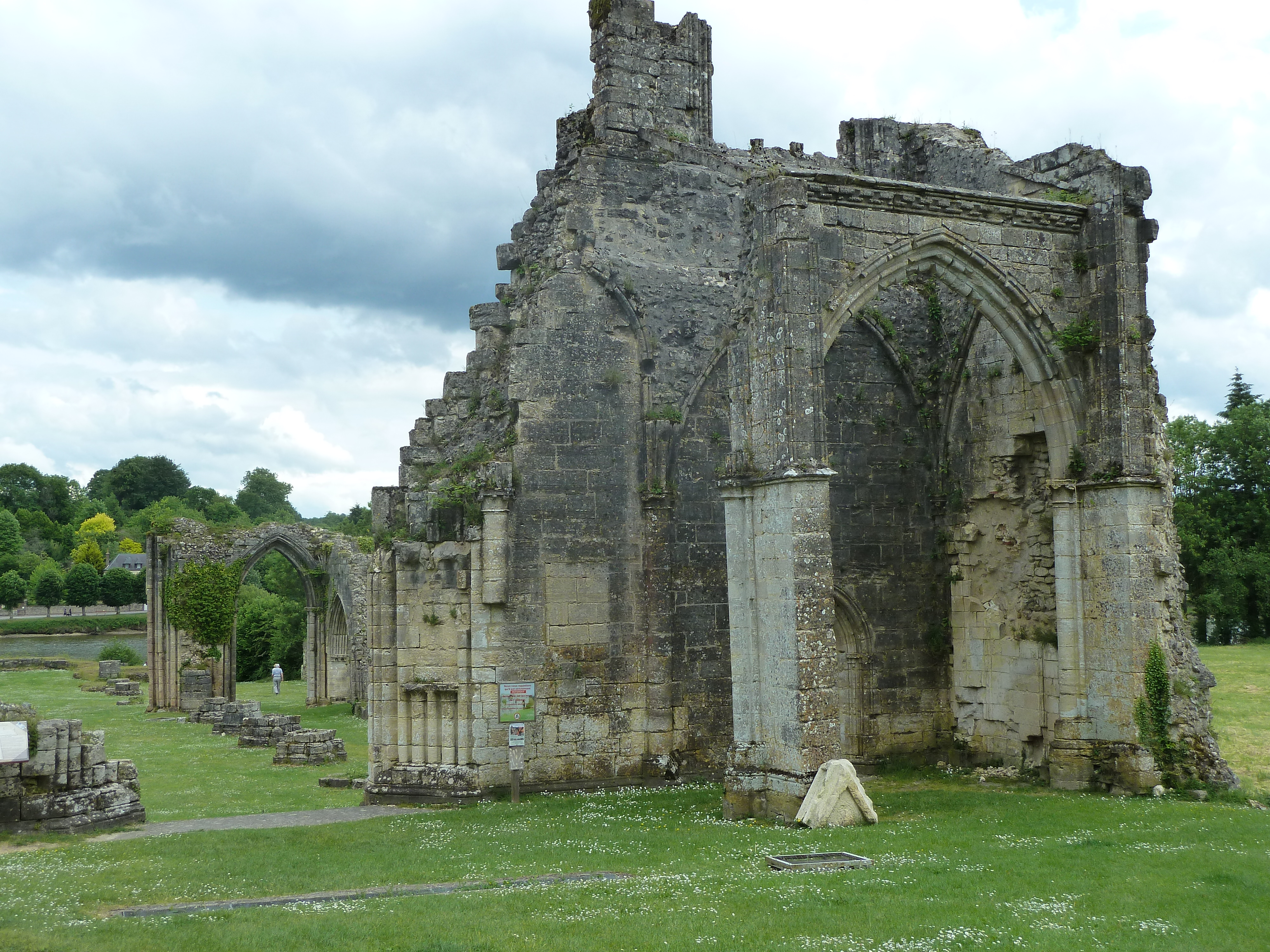
Ruins of the Abbey of St Evroult

The first clear evidence of a parish church at Sheriffhales occurs in a charter of 1081, five years before the Domesday survey. The charter is known only because it was preserved in the Ecclesiastical History of Orderic Vitalis, an important Anglo-Norman chronicler. Orderic was a Benedictine monk at the Abbey of Saint-Evroult, although he was born in Shrewsbury and had entered the order at Shrewsbury Abbey. In the charter, issued at Winchester, William the Conqueror approves a long list of donations by his barons to St Evroult. Including the church at Hales.

Guarinus vicecomes de Scrobesburia dedit S. Ebrulfo Neutonam et ecclesiam de Halis cum decima, decimamque de Deguestona in Estaforde; et haec dominus ejus Rogerius comes concessit.

Translation:

Warin, viscount of Shrewsbury, gave to St. Evroult Newton and the church and tithes of Hales, with the tithes of Weston in Staffordshire. All these Earl Roger his lord confirmed.

Warin was the first known Sheriff of Shropshire: Sheriff, rather than ‘viscount', is the usual translation of the Medieval Latin viscomes , although both make clear that Warin was subordinate to great landowner and magnate of the region, Roger de Montgomery, the Count (comes) or Earl of Shrewsbury. Roger was one of a handful of Tenants-in-chief trusted by William I to control important strategic areas: he dominated the county of Shropshire and a large part of the Welsh Marches, as well as a section of the English Channel coast in Sussex, with well over 350 holdings listed in Domesday. Warin was unlikely to proceed in any major transaction without Earl Roger's approval. This approval is signalled not only in the text of the charter, but by the attendance of Roger and Warin together at court in Winchester to act as witnesses. The other Staffordshire properties in Warin's grant are probably the hamlet of Newton near Blithfield, in central Staffordshire, and Weston-under-Lizard, a short distance east of Sheriffhales along Watling Street. These grants failed to survive and neither property was held by St Evroult in 1086, but by Warin's successor, the Sheriff Reginald, as both tenant-in-chief and manorial lord. Sheriffhales, on the contrary, was divided between Reginald and St Evroult, with Roger de Montgomery as tenant-in-chief.

=== Rectory ===
The rectory is essentially the right to use the income of the church, which came as rents from tenants on church lands; tithes, a 10% levy on the incomes of all parishioners; and produce of the glebe, the land retained by the church for its own use. In the early years these would have been paid largely in kind. Because of Warin's grant, St Evroult Abbey, which in legal documents is represented as its abbot and convent, was the rector of Sheriffhales.

This arrangement, by which a foreign monastery took considerable profits from a Staffordshire village, was not unique and did not start with the Norman conquest. Lapley Priory a few miles from Sheriffhales was a satellite house of the Abbey of Saint-Remi or Saint-Rémy at Reims in Northern France. Founded and endowed by Earl Morcar's father, Ælfgar, around the middle of the century, Lapley housed a cell, a small priory of monks who managed and exploited the Abbey's lands in Staffordshire.

Evroult Abbey built up a much larger and more widespread endowment of lands and churches in England than most other French abbeys. Warin's grant of three properties in Staffordshire was dwarfed by the other gifts even in the same charter of William I. Other similar royal charters hugely enlarged this property portfolio,. to the extent that its English possessions became its main source of income, bringing in, it claimed, up to £2000 a year. Instead of establishing many local priories, it chose to develop a central administrative and collection centre at Ware Priory in Hertfordshire. Ware Priory is first explicitly mentioned as agent of St Evroult in a charter of William de Blois, bishop of Lincoln, whose episcopate lasted from 1203 to 1206, but it had probably been handling Evroult Abbey's business in England for some time before that. By the early 14th century Ware is being mentioned in relation to Evroult's business at Sheriffhales.

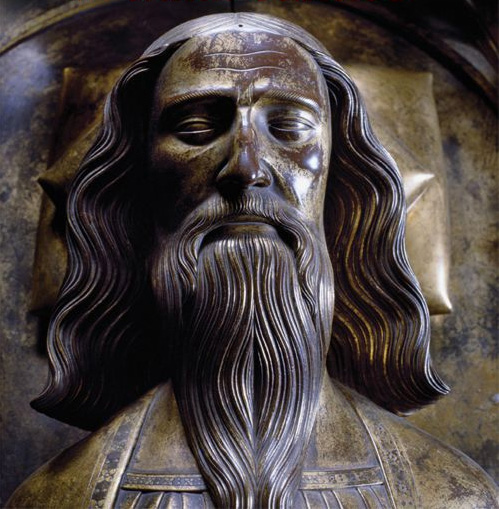
Effigy of Edward III, from his tomb in Westminster Abbey.

At the commencement of what became the Hundred Years' War in 1337, Edward III took over churches held by French monasteries, known as alien priories, including Ware Priory, annexing their revenue and presenting their priests. In this instance he allowed the priors to carry on administering their monasteries on condition they paid large sums to one of his favourites, William Trussell, a close relative of the manorial lords of Sheriffhales. The prior of Ware was told to find £115 by the following Easter towards a grant of £1000 for Trussell. The known vicars of Sheriffhales in the reign of Richard II and Henry IV were all appointed by the king during wartime, so the revenues of the rectory at those times will have been going to the king.

This changed in 1414, a year after the accession of Henry V, when he undertook the first major dissolution of monasteries in England. Authorised by the Fire and Faggot Parliament at Leicester, he dissolved all the alien priories: hence Sheriffhales church, and all the other estates of St Evroult vested in Ware Priory, were taken over by the king. Initially the income was simply used to meet current royal expenses. A large, lifelong, annual income from Ware was granted to Queen Joan, the king's step-mother, in January 1415. In less than three months, the plan had changed. By a charter issued at Westminster on 1 April 1415, Sheriffhales rectory, along with the rest of the Ware endowment, was transferred to one of the king's favourite building projects: Sheen Priory, a magnificent Charterhouse or monastery for forty Carthusians, and part of a royal complex centred on Sheen Palace, later Richmond Palace, at the side of the River Thames in Surrey. In July the prior of Sheen was given permission to pursue any debts owing to Ware in the Exchequer, and Joan was promised compensation for loss of the promised income. St Evroult took the matter as far as a complaint to the Pope, which was not finally dismissed until 1427, five years after the Henry V's death.

=== Advowson ===
The advowson of church is the right to present or nominate a candidate to become its priest, who becomes entitled to its living or benefice, the package of rewards associated with the post. At Sheriffhales the advowson went with the rectory throughout the medieval period. So the Abbey of St Evroult held the right to appoint the parish priest from 1081 to 1414, subject to the approval of the diocesan bishop. The advowson at Sheriffhales was quite valuable because it gave access to a good income. The vicarage at Sheriffhales was valued for tax purposes at £13 6s. 8d. by the Taxatio Ecclesiastica of 1291-1292, an inquiry that was part of a fund-raising effort by Pope Nicholas IV, who promised a 10% cut to Edward I, By comparison, nearby Shifnal was worth rather more at £21 10s. 8d., while Tong was valued at a mere £4 6s. 8d. For Ware Priory and its mother Abbey of St Evroult, Sheriffhales was a useful office with which to reward faithful servants or a marketable asset to sell to ambitious clergy. It was described as ecclesia de Hales appropriata priori de Ware, the church at Hales, appropriated by Ware Priory. As with its flow of income from the rectory, the Abbey's appointments were interrupted by the king's own nominees in times of war, until Sheen Priory, also known as “House of Jesus of Bethlehem," took over in 1415.

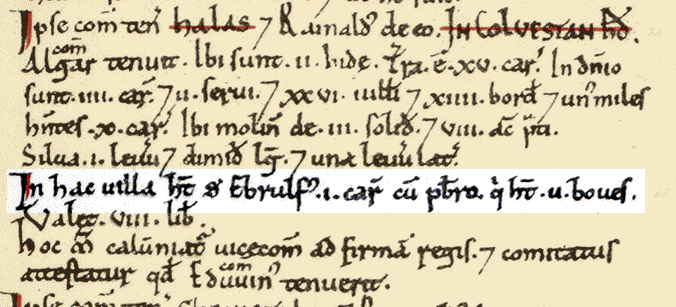
The Domesday entry for Sheriffhales, from Staffordshire folio 5 at Open Domesday. The information about the priest is highlighted.

It is clear that St Evroult did ensure from the outset that a priest was provided for Sheriffhales. The Domesday, inquiry just 5 years after Warin's grant to the abbey, found that “In this village Saint-Evroult's has 1 plough with a priest who has 2 oxen." At some point the Abbey established a vicarage – not in this usage a clergy house, but the position of resident priest supported by a designated portion of the tithes. The first vicar whose name is known, John Pillardington, was recorded as presented by the Abbot and Convent of St. Evroult in 1319, but his successor in 1328 was recorded as the nominee of Hugh of Wye, who was the proctor of the Abbot of St Evroult in England and also Prior of Ware. The two descriptions amount to the same thing.

The proctors seem to have shown a marked preference for presenting clergy who were already in their employment. Three of the four earliest recorded vicars are identified by a placename: Pillardington. Several people with this surname are known to have been attorneys of Ware Priory. Pillardington is a Warwickshire village, now called Pillerton Hersey: two thirds of its rectory belonged to St Evroult, through Ware Priory In William I's charter of 1081 both Pillerton and Ware were granted to St Evroult by Hugh de Grandmesnil immediately following Warin's grant of Sheriffhales. The John Pillardington who was presented to Hales in 1337 had been the vicar of St Mary's Church, Ware. John exchanged with Richard Pillardington, who had been vicar of Hales, but was now presented to the church at Ware. The business was conducted at Woodstock Palace all on the same day. The names suggest the prior was still getting his candidates appointed but had to have presentations validated at the king's court, as the temporalities of Ware Priory were in his hands for the time being.

Once Sheen Priory took over the advowson, royal presentations ceased and the Prior of Sheen was free to choose the vicar of Sheriffhales, except in one instance. In 1478, John Hales (bishop of Coventry and Lichfield) intervened to impose one James Higgs as vicar in place of Roger Capse, the chosen candidate of the Prior and Convent of Jesus and Bethlehem at Sheen.

=== Building ===
The main phases of medieval building at Sheriffhales church are generally considered to have been during the 12th and 14th centuries. Warin had presumably ensured that there was a viable building before handing it over to St Evroult in 1181. Whether the Abbey intervened at any time is unknown: its main interest was in extracting value. Manorial lords frequently contributed to churches. In the early church-building periods the manor of Sheriffhales was held by the Pantulf and Trussell families: it was even sometimes called by their names, in place of "Sheriff". William FitzAlan, Lord of Oswestry, then overlord of Sheriffhales, granted it to Ivo Pantulf in the mid-12th century. One of his descendants, Hugh Pantulf, was Sheriff of Shropshire throughout the 1180s. The Pantulfs were wealthy and eminent enough to contribute to the church, as were the Trussells after them, but there is no direct documentary evidence. It is known that the manorial lord, William Trussell of Kibblestone (now part of Oulton), undertook considerable building work at Sheriffhales in 1367, as he obtained permission both to fortify the manor house and to enclose his park.

By the early 15th century, the manor of Sheriffhales belonged to Fulk Pembridge. His widow, Isabel Lingen, inherited from him a half share. Her generosity to the Church is not in doubt: as early as 1410 she paid £40 to obtain permission to found a chantry and mausoleum church for herself, her late husband and numerous others — but at Tong, rather than Sheriffhales. The possibility of legal complications with the Trussells at Sheriffhales would have weighted the decision, as there were competing claims that dragged on for decades. Just as Sheriffhales church was transferred to Sheen Priory, Isabel was fortunate to win Henry V's support and he assigned to her the confiscated possessions of Lapley Priory, which set the nearby Collegiate church at Tong on a secure financial footing.

=== Priests and people ===
Domesday revealed that Sheriffhales manor then had 44 households, perhaps a population of about 200. This placed it in the largest 20% of recorded settlements at the time, according to OpenDomesday. It is impossible to know how well the provision of priests by St Evroult served it at that time.

It seems that Ware Priory often used the church as a reward for its own legal team, who presumably had employment elsewhere, often for long periods. Some vicars were described as chaplains, suggesting that they also had responsibilities elsewhere: if not actually for the priors of Ware, then for some other important household or institution. The exchange of parishes by John and Richard Pillardington was not the only royal presentation motivated mainly by the convenience of the clergy concerned. In 1370, for example, Edward III presented Richard Erkalwe, the vicar of Audlem, to St Mary's so that the vicar William Huwet could exchange parishes with him. By 1396 Huwet must have returned as vicar because he again exchanged St Mary's, this time for Great Witley, while Richard II exercised the advowson in place of Ware Priory to present Richard Fanley in his place. On 22 December 1398 Richard II again stood in for Ware to present John de Walton to the vicarage of Sheriffhales. Another brief interlude saw Henry IV use the French war as an opportunity to present William Smyth as vicar in January 1403.

By the mid-14th century, all churches in Shropshire and Staffordshire were under great pressure from several directions. The Great Famine of 1315–22 followed by the Black Death, which arrived in the Spring of 1349 but recurred for three centuries, imposed a great spiritual and theological challenge, but also hugely reduced the value of agricultural assets and incomes. Churches and monasteries were affected as much as other landowners, and it seems that people perceived a fall in both the quantity and quality of the clergy.

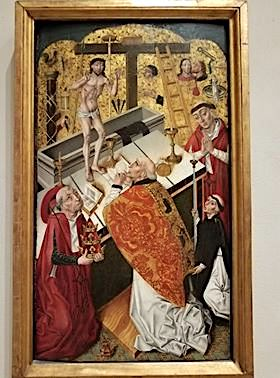
Mass of St. Gregory, c. 1490, attributed to Diego de la Cruz, oil and gold on panel (Philadelphia Museum of Art) Gregory's legendary vision was a popular theme in the 15th century, providing a graphic argument for transubstantiation. Mirk also employed a similar legend about Oda of Canterbury

There is evidence from the vicinity of Sheriffhales that attitudes to the parish clergy were divided and often critical and that this was a matter of concern to the Church. The Testimony of William Thorpe, a Lollard document claims the eponymous author delivered a fiery sermon in 1407 at St Chad's Church, Shrewsbury, denouncing clerical abuses and pilgrimages. Thorpe's responses, when arrested and questioned before Thomas Arundel, the Archbishop of Canterbury, encapsulate a widespread lay attitude to the clergy:

"Sir, it is now no wonder, though the people grudge to give priests the livelihood that they ask. Mickle people know now, how that priests should live, and how that they live contrary to Christ and to his apostles. And therefore the people is full heavy to pay (as they do) their temporal goods to parsons, and to other vicars and priests, which should be faithful dispensators of the parish's goods, taking to themselves no more but a scarce living of tithes nor of offerings...

The pastoral theology John Mirk of Lilleshall Abbey, only 3 km from Sheriffhales, makes clear that even orthodox thinkers shared the widespread disenchantment with the clergy. His last known work, is the Manuale Sacerdotis, or Priest's Handbook, probably written around 1400, when he was Prior, or deputy to the Abbot of Lilleshall. It is possible that it was addressed personally to John Sotton, who became vicar of St Alkmund's Church, Shrewsbury, in 1414. Unlike his earlier Instructions for Priests, a text in Shropshire Middle English that told priests how to perform the practical functions of parish work, the Handbook is concerned more with what makes a good priest and what a bad priest or, as Mirk designates him, a modern priest. Susan Powell summarises that Mirk's purpose is “to shock a young man...into awareness of what being a priest actually means." Mirk was a strong believer in transubstantiation. The priest's role in this he saw as both an awesome power and huge responsibility. This meant that “the whole life of a good priest, if he lives rightly, ought to be a cross and a martyrdom." (Tota itaque vita boni sacerdotis, si recte vivat, crux debet esse et martirium).

== Reformation and revolution ==
=== Dissolution and its consequences ===
After the dissolution of the monasteries the rectory and advowson of the church both found their way into the hands of local gentry. The Valor Ecclesiasticus of 1535 reported that the John Moorhouse (sometimes rendered as Morris), the vicar of Sheriffhales, had a gross annual income of £12. The net income was £11 1s. 8d., rendered as eleven pounds and twenty pence. The produce from the glebe was worth only 10 shillings and the largest single contribution to his income was £4 from the grain tithe levied on his parishioners. John Jobourn, the Prior of Sheen, was due the sum of £6 6s. 8d., an amount confirmed by the entry for Sheriffhales in the Priory's own listing.

The Valor was soon followed by the Suppression of Religious Houses Act 1535 which provided for the dissolution of the lesser monasteries. This affected the ecclesiastical landscape around Sheriffhales in stages. Wombridge Priory, a very small house near Shifnal was soon dissolved, while neighbouring Lilleshall Abbey was above the threshold income of £200 per annum. Sheen Priory in Surrey seemed untouchable with a huge income of just over £800. However, the greater monasteries were increasingly subjected to cajoling and intimidation which wore away their will to resist, even before any legislation was passed to suppress them. Lilleshall surrendered on 16 October 1538.

At Sheen Priory, even before the valuation, Prior John Jobourn had angered Henry VIII, by his reluctance to take the Oath of Supremacy, bringing on himself pressure, imprisonment and removal. After an internal power struggle, Henry Man emerged as prior. He was a supporter of the king, brought in from Witham Charterhouse, where he had been prior, to subvert resistance. Before he became prior at Sheen he served a year or two as proctor, responsible for managing all the priory's huge endowments, Sheriffhales included. He was probably well-placed to advise on the value of its assets. Sheen Priory surrendered to the king early in 1539 (or late 1538 in the Julian Calendar) and Prior Man was awarded a very large pension of £133 6s. 8d., going on to become successively Dean of Chester and, appropriately, Bishop of Sodor and Man.

=== Advowson and rectory ===
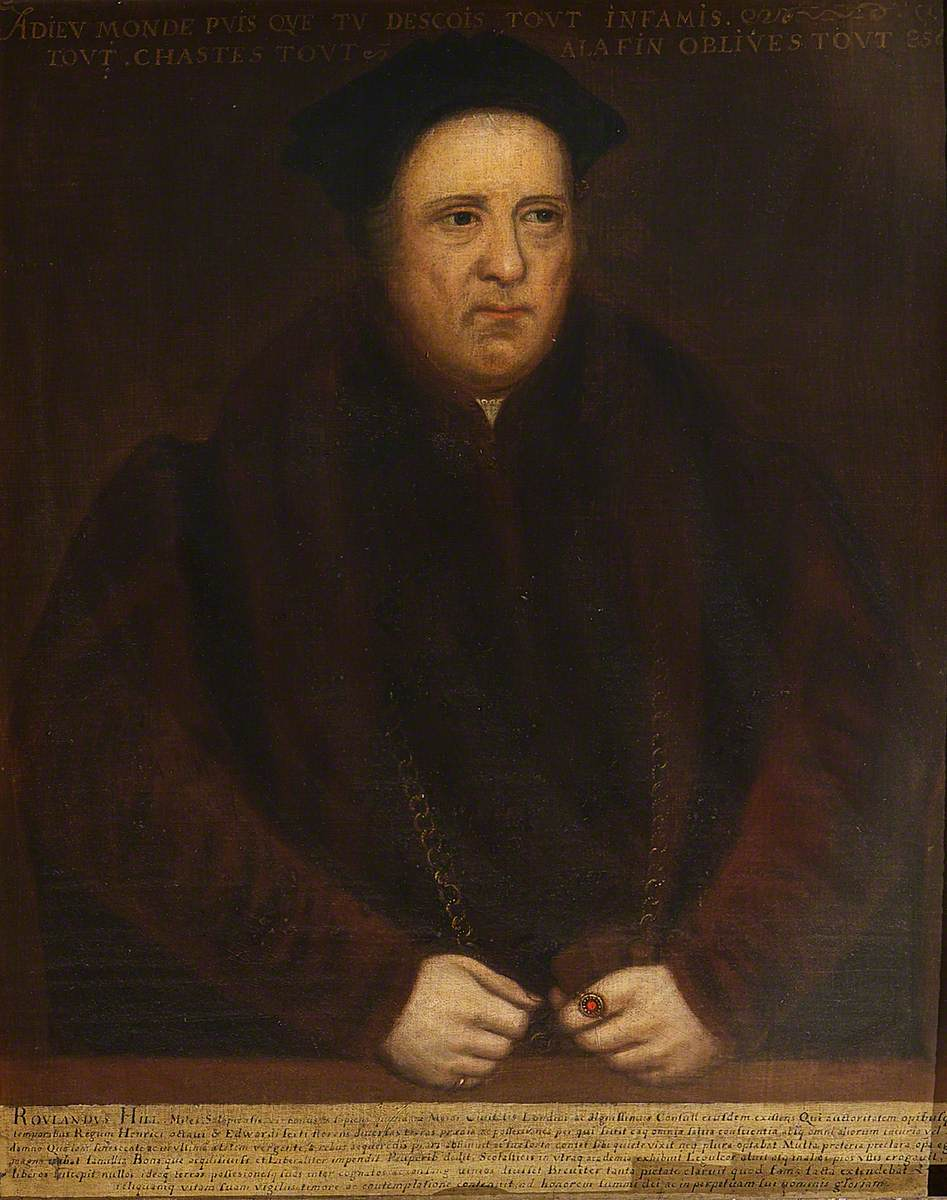
Sir Rowland Hill

The Aston family of Tixall Hall presented all the vicars to the church at Sheriffhales between the dissolution of the monasteries and the English Civil War. It seems that successive kings, Henry VIII and Edward VI kept Sheriffhales church for more than 13 years after the suppression of Sheen Priory before putting it on the market in 1552. On 14 November of that year Sir Rowland Hill, an immensely rich Protestant business man of Hodnet, Shropshire, and the City of London, paid the very large sum of £408 10s. 8d. for a portfolio of churches. The reason for the sell-off was made very clear: Hill brought "ready money" to an always-cash-strapped government. His purchases included "the rectory, and the advowson, of the vicarage of Shereff Hales, Salop and Staff," as well as the appurtenances – presumably any buildings, fittings and fixtures. The other churches included were St Michael's Church, High Ercall and St Andrew's at Stanton upon Hine Heath. The entire purchase was expected to yield an annual income of only £17 17s. 9½d.

However, Rowland Hill bought churches wholesale and sold them retail, making a profit by splitting them among buyers who wanted them. He had even bought and sold the advowson of his own home parish of Hodnet. The next presentation at Sheriffhales was in 1556, and the advowson at that point was certainly held by Sir Edward Aston. The rectory of Sheriffhales too was sold on by 1560 to Sir Richard Leveson of Lilleshall who made his will shortly before his death in that year, at which point he held the rectory, alongside his lordship of the manor of Sheriffhales.

=== Vicars 1534–1649 ===
The Book of Common Prayer, 1552.

==== John Moorhouse ====
John Moorhouse, also rendered Morris, was the last vicar presented to Sheriffhales by the prior of Sheen – in his case probably Jon Jobourn, on 13 January 1534, Little is known of Moorhouse himself beyond his obvious adaptability and ability to survive. Less than a year after his induction into Sheriffhales Henry VIII initiated a process of rolling change and reaction that would preoccupy the church in England for more at least a century and a half. The Act of Supremacy later in 1534 made the king supreme ruler of the Church of England. Moorhouse remained vicar through the increasing radicalization of Edward VI's reign. In 1552, late in Moorhouse's lifetime, a national inventory, taken in response to the widespread destruction of religious images and the looting of fittings and fixtures, found that Sheriffhales church owned:

Fyrste one challess of sylver with a paten ; two vestements of dornex; ij albes ; two copes of sylke, one grene the other red ; two alter clothes ; one senser of brasse ; two cruetts of leade ; one cope blewe sylke ; three bells and a sanctus bell.
Mem. — That one crosse of brasse was stolne out of the churche.

Translation:

First one chalice of silver with a paten; two vestments made of linen fabric from Tournai; 2 albs; two silk copes, one green, the other red; two altar cloths; one brass censer; two lead cruets; one blue silk cope; three bells and a sanctus bell.
Memo: a brass cross was stolen from the church.

Moorhouse lived through the introduction of the Book of Common Prayer which brought in a full liturgy in English, and died in the reign of the Catholic monarchs Mary I and Philip, who repaired relations with the Papacy and commenced a new persecution of Protestants.

==== John Beeche ====
John Beech was presented to the Benefice of Sheriffhales by Sir Edward Aston of Tixall Hall, and instituted as Perpetual Vicar on 7 September 1556 by Ralph Baines, the last Roman Catholic Bishop of Coventry and Lichfield There is a record of a young Johens Beche serving as a curate of Cropthorne in 1550: this may be him. It is likely he was sometimes absent from Sheriffhales, as he was also chaplain to Aston. A few months after his appointment, on 16 April 1557, the extant parish register began, recording baptisms, marriages and deaths at Sheriffhales church in a narrow parchment volume. The register proudly bears the names and regnal years of Mary and Philip. The first recorded incidents are the burials of William Horsebrook and William Ditcher, on the same day. Registers had been compulsory since 1538 but many parishes had not complied.

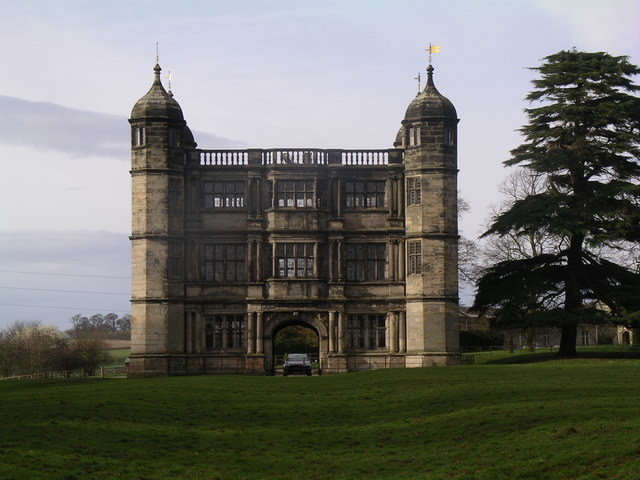
Tixall Gatehouse is all that remains of the Aston family seat.

Beeche must have ridden out the momentous changes brought about by the Elizabethan settlement, which definitively turned the English Church Protestant. He was involved in a controversy with John Cotes over the jurisdiction of the chapel at Woodcote, within Sheriffhales parish. Thomas Bentham, the recently appointed Protestant bishop, wrote to both of them on 29 November 1560 to arrange a meeting, although both the agenda and the outcome are unknown. Bishop William Overton was in communication with Thomas Parkyn, a curate, at Woodcote in 1584 but it is not known how he was appointed: it is possible that Parkyn was a student at Magdalene College, Cambridge and graduated in 1567.

Beeche was buried at Sheriffhales on 29 March 1586, as recorded in his own parish register.

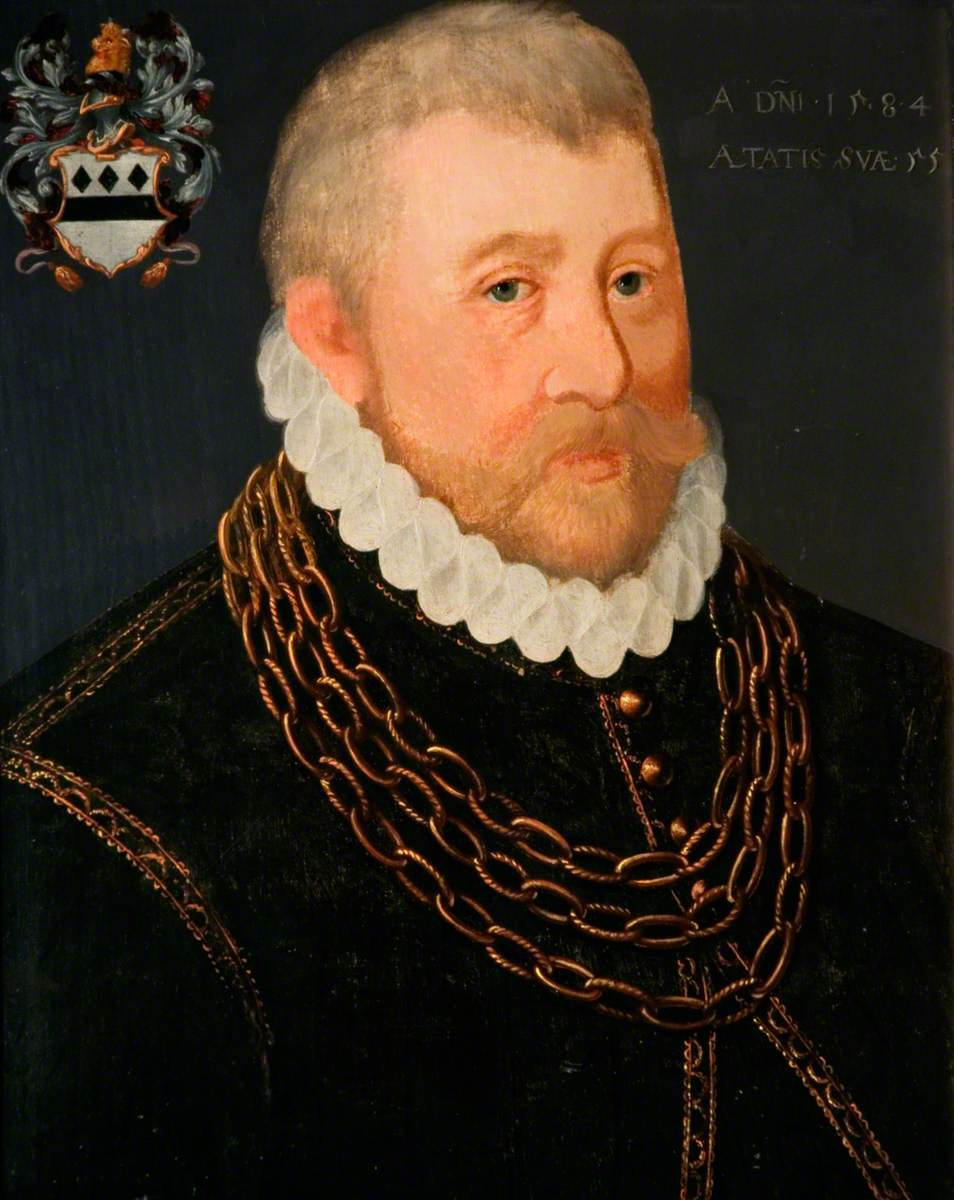
Sir Walter Aston of Tixall (1530–1589), patron of Sheriffhales church.

==== George Dunne ====
George Dunne, was presented by Sir Walter Aston and instituted on 9 June 1586. He was probably identical with the George Dune who was ordained priest by John Bullingham, the Bishop of Gloucester, on17 September 1583, so still a young man when he became vicar of Sheriffhales. There is no reference to his being a chaplain. The steady growth of his family can be traced through the parish register, showing that he was the first legally married vicar, and suggesting that he was generally present in the parish. His and his wife Elizabeth's first child, Thomas, was baptised on 26 February 1588. Another son, William, was baptised on 2 March 1590 Their first daughter Elizabeth was baptised on 7 Feb 1592 However her burial was recorded only two months later In the next two years came two more daughters, Judith and Margaret. Then came another six children: Joseph in 1597, A second Elizabeth in 1599, Susan in 1601 Benjamin in 1604 and, after a considerable break, Mary in 1608 Most of children were given common Biblical names. Although they were deuterocanonical heroines, both Judith and Susanna were popular among Puritans and later Nonconformists. It was not unusual to repeat a name, in this case Elizabeth, the mother's own name, but also the queen's, especially, but not only, when the earlier holder of the name died young. In 1600 the parish register listed the name of the churchwardens, alongside the vicar. They were George Unton and Stephen Taylor. Churchwardens had existed for centuries but this was the first time they were named at Sheriffhales. From this point they were generally listed each year in the register.

The controversy over Woodcote chapel seems to have subsided. By 1616 Bishop George Abbot had appointed a reader, Thomas Beeston, to serve at the chapel, possibly an acknowledgement that it was of subsidiary status. George Dunne was buried on 8 Feb 1622 at Sheriffhales.

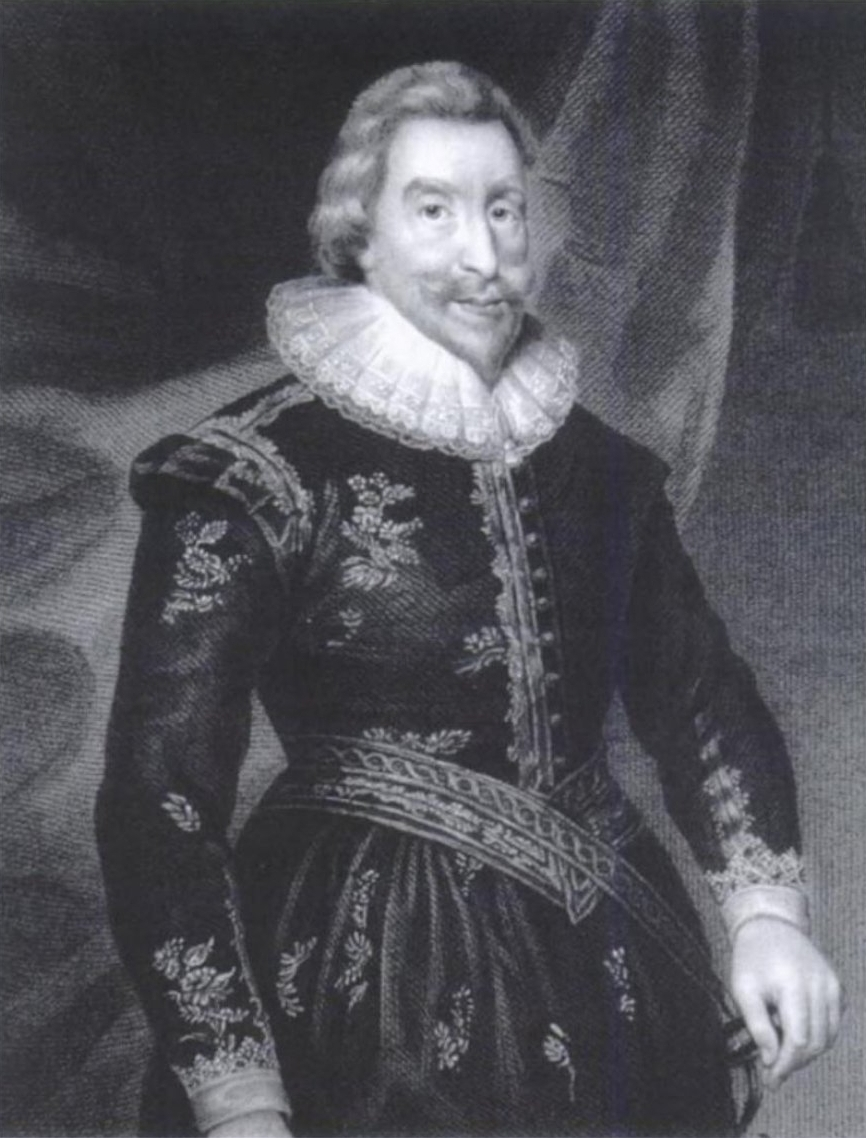
Walter Aston, 1st Lord Aston of Forfar

==== William Jeffreye ====
William Jeffreye (known in numerous spellings) was fresh out of university, with a Bachelor of Arts, from Pembroke College, Cambridge, when he was presented to the church at Sheriffhales by Sir Walter Aston and instituted by Bishop Thomas Morton on 12 August 1622. He was attributed at that time an MA but the university's record shows that it was not awarded until 1625. He seems nevertheless to have been an outstanding student from a relatively humble background, as he was admitted as a sizar, an assisted student, at the age of 13 and so only 17 when he became a vicar. He did not attend his own induction at Sheriffhales. As it was necessary for a newly appointed clergyman to subscribe to the Thirty-nine Articles a deputy, Alexander Fore, attended to do so on his behalf, but only orally: the diocesan record points out that he did not sign. Jeffreye himself was said to be abroad, acting as chaplain to Sir Walton Aston.

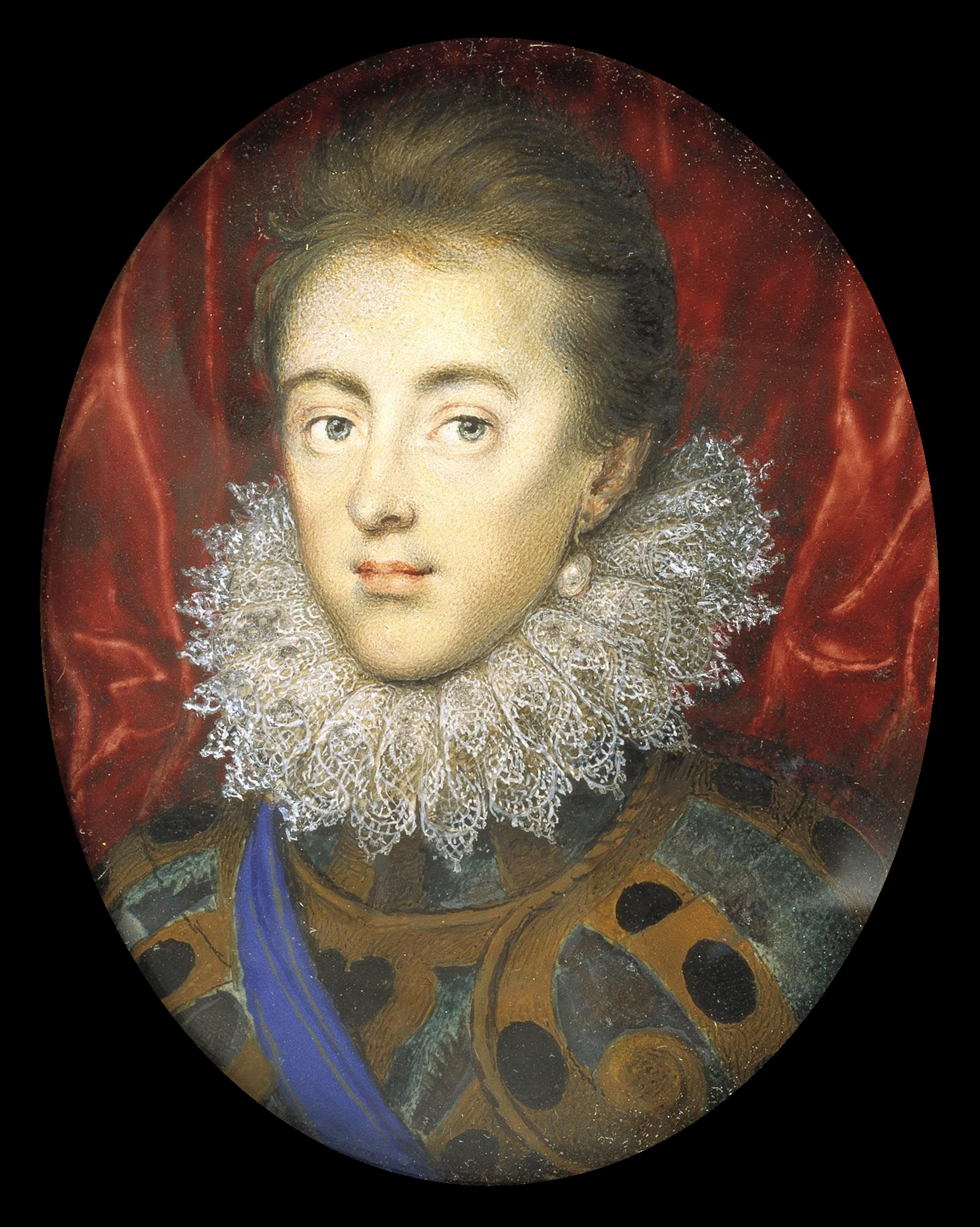
Charles, Prince of Wales (1615 portrait by Isaac Oliver)

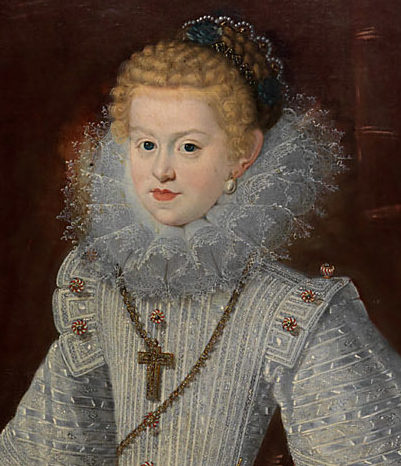
The Infanta Maria Anna (1617 portrait by Bartolomé González y Serrano)

In July 1619 Aston had been appointed ambassador to Spain by James VI and I. with the proviso that he accompany the existing ambassador, Lord Digby to Madrid and take over only after Digby had dealt with unfinished business. It soon became clear that Aston's role was to prepare for the Spanish match, the proposed marriage of Prince Charles to the Infanta Maria Anna of Spain. To prepare for this work Aston introduced himself to Charles, tentatively expressing the hope that "theare may may fall out many ocations for the service of yr highnes in the place where I live..." Jeffreye set out for Madrid before his induction at Sheriffhales. Probably while Jeffreye was with him, Aston converted to Catholicism. There followed the fiasco of Charles's failed wooing in Madrid, which ruined Digby. Charles forgave his friend Aston both the failure of his match and his conversion.

A curate called Peter Hadfield had taken over at Sheriffhales even before Jeffreye was presented, and his name is written in the parish register beside that of the churchwardens from 1622 until 1627, which may indicate that Jeffreye was absent, although not necessarily in Spain, throughout that period. Jeffreye seems to have been ambitious and he expanded his income by taking on other clerical posts while he was vicar of Sheriffhales. These included prebends at Lichfield Cathedral: Gaia Major, just north of the cathedral, in 1625, succeeded by High Offley in 1627. In 1628 he also took on what should have been a very demanding post as Archdeacon of Salop, which he did not resign until 1663. Moving on to a more lucrative parish, in January 1631 he was instituted Rector of Hamstall Ridware. He resigned the vicarage of Sheriffhales on 10 February 1631.

==== John Morton ====
John Morton was presented by the same patron, who was now Lord Aston of Forfar. He was another young and inexperienced appointment, only slightly less precocious than Jeffreye, and only a year or two younger. He was probably the son of William Morton, an Archdeacon of Durham. He was admitted to Sidney Sussex College, Cambridge as a pensioner in 1621, aged 14. However, he took four years to graduate as a BA. Shortly after he graduated MA in 1629 he was ordained deacon at Eccleshall by Bishop Thomas Morton. He is likely to have been priested in 1630 and on Saturday 26 February 1631 was inducted vicar of Sheriffhales by the rectors of Longford and Edgmond, as recorded in a memorandum in the parish register. The following day he read the Thirty-nine articles in the Sunday service. Thereafter his name appears annually, alongside the churchwardens', in the parish register until his death in 1649.

=== Puritan activism ===
At the time of Jeffreye's resignation in favour of Morton, the country was almost two years into the Personal Rule of Charles I, in which no English Parliament was convened for eleven years. The king promoted Laudianism in the Church of England, intensely opposed by Puritans. A particular focus of ire was the willingness of Charles I to take Roman Catholics into his confidence, including the queen, Henrietta Maria, and converts like Walter Aston, the patron of Sheriffhales, whom he continued to employ long after he became king: as late as 1635 he booked a passage for Aston from Portsmouth to A Coruña in a ship named the Henrietta Maria. Charles continually denied working with Catholics but continued to do so right into the Civil War.

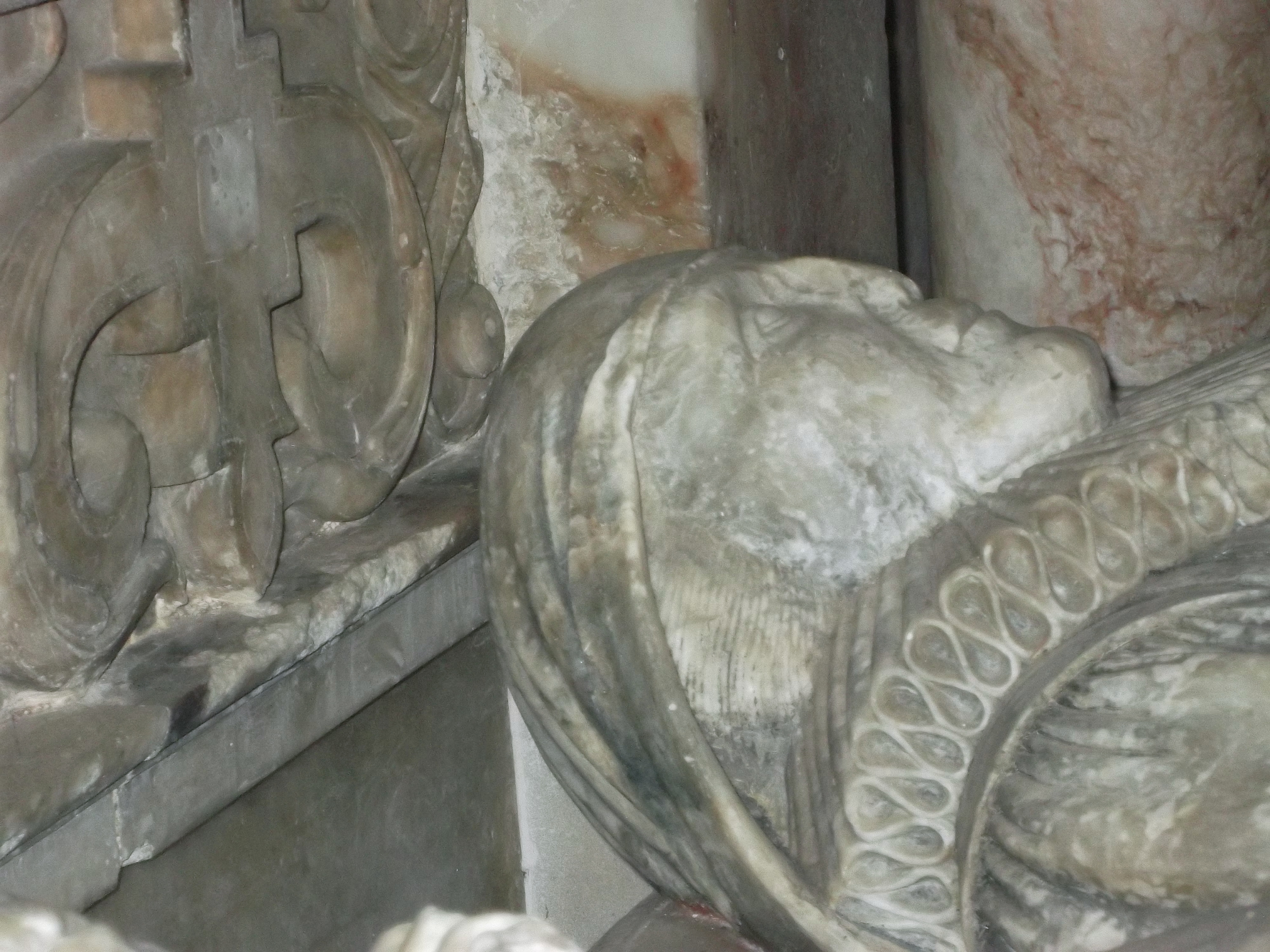
Margaret Bromley from the tomb of Sir Edward Bromley at Worfield, Shropshire.

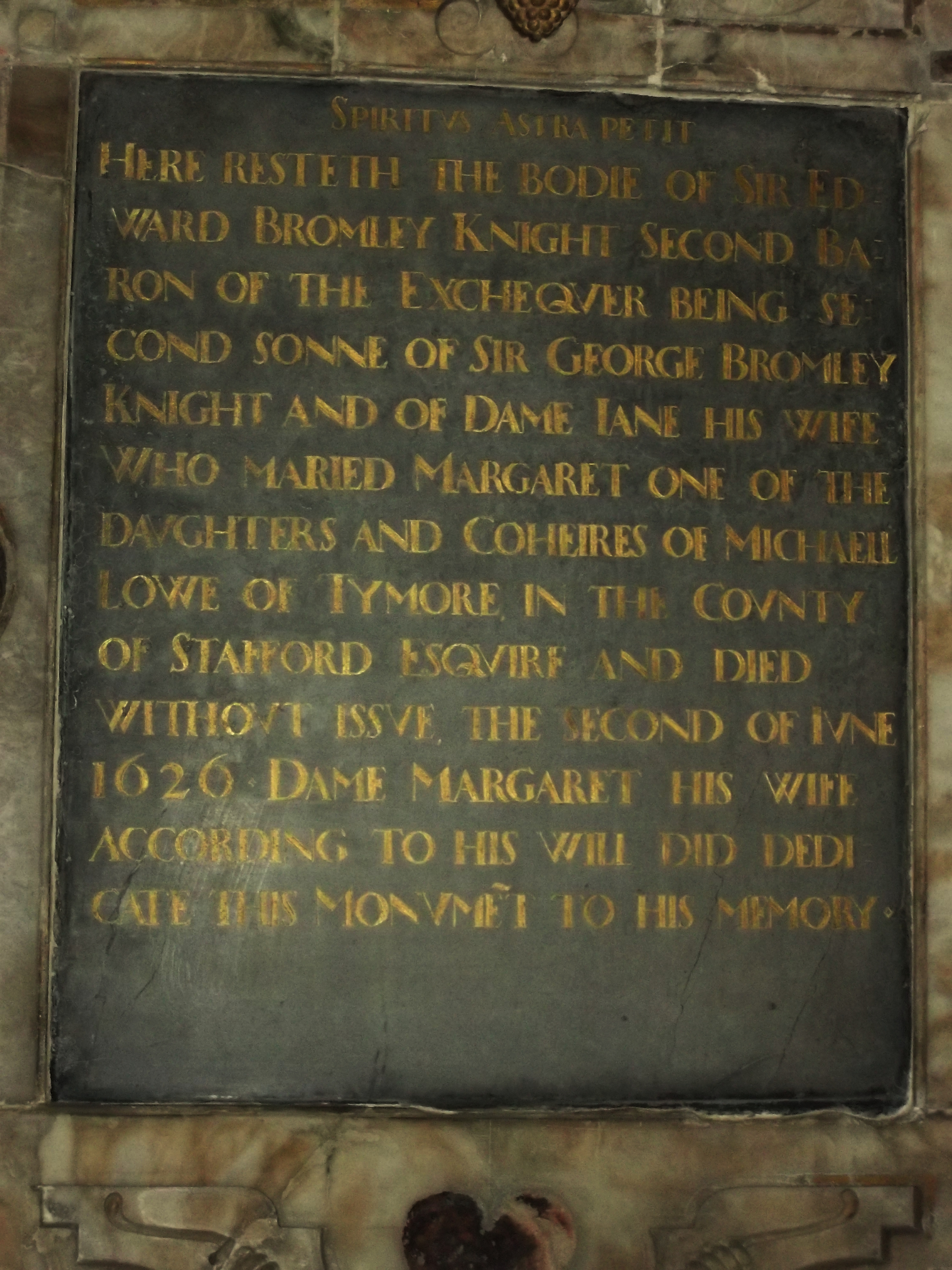
Epitaph of Sir Edward Bromley, attributing the tomb to Lady Margaret.

During this period of growing tension there was intense Puritan activity in Sheriffhales, focused on Lady Margaret Bromley, who settled in the village after ther husband, the distinguished lawyer Sir Edward Bromley died in 1626. They had lived at Shifnal Grange but there were land disputes with the Davenport family that forced several alterations to Margaret's jointure arrangements and led her to take up residence in Sheriffhales: Sir Edward must have had connections with the village as he set aside in his will a small sum for distribution to its poor. Margaret settled at Sheriffhales while Jeffreye was still vicar: her servant Robert Cowper was buried in the churchyard on 12 June 1630. Margaret and her two sisters, Margery and Katherine, were the heirs of their father, Michael Lowe of Tymore, in Fisherwick parish, near Lichfield, a noted Protestant lawyer. Lowe provided for his daughters partly by arranging their marriages to close and capable Protestant colleagues at the Inner Temple: Bromley, Abney and Bromskill.

All accounts of Margaret Bromley' activities at Sheriffhales make clear that she was active in securing a supply of notable preachers by opening her home to Puritan ministers in need of refuge from the authorities. Samuel Clarke praised Margaret Bromley's generosity, which benefited a stream of fugitive Puritan preachers:

...the vertuous Lady Margaret Bromley (who then dwelt at Sheriffe Hales in Shropshire) deserves an honorable remembrance, because she was a constant and unparallel'd favourer of all good ministers and People, being both tender-hearted and open handed such who suffered under Prelatical pressures and otherwise, and at her house the most famous ministers in all neighbour-countries had hearty welcomes, with manifold sweet opportunities of service unto God, and of mutual edification.

Benjamin Brook, a nonconformist minister and writer later explained:

These divines often preached in her neighbourhood, whom she sheltered from the oppressive measures of the prelates, as long as she was able; and when they durst not preach, they kept days of fasting and humiliation at her home.

Clarke and Brook mention a number of preachers who took refuge with Margaret Bromley. Probably most prominent was Julines Herring, another Cambride graduate. He was the public preacher appointed to St Alkmund's Church, Shrewsbury, by the town's corporation, and closely connected with a circle of Puritan businessmen and their wives, centred on the wealthy brewer John Rowley. Herring was considered a powerful and attractive preacher: Clarke pictured him in an earlier position at Calke in Derbyshire, preaching through open windows to a surrounding crowd, many of them bringing picnics so that they could spend the whole day in teaching and discussion. Also well-known was John Ball, an old friend of Herring, ordained alongside him by an Irish bishop in 1610, in order to avoid subscribing to the Thirty-Nine Articles. Robert Nicolls of Wrenbury, in Cheshire, Herring's brother-in-law; took refuge at Sheriffhales and died there. He had got into trouble for criticising signing with the Cross in baptism, the surplice and kneeling to receive Communion. Thomas Langley of Middlewich was another refugee from Cheshire at Sheriffhales, one of a number fleeing John Bridgeman, Bishop of Chester. Thomas Pierson of Brampton Bryan, where the fiercely Presbyterian landowner Robert Harley held sway, was one of the Puritan ministers Herring brought in to preach at Shrewsbury, along with Nicolls.

All of this network of Puritans were committed to reform of the Church of England. At Shrewsbury Herring had clashed with separatists who favoured breaking away to form Independent or Congregational churches, including Katherine Chidley and her husband Daniel. Herring spoke for Presbyterians generally, averring:

It is a sin of an high nature, to unchurche a Nation at once, and that this would become the spring of many other fearful errours, for separation will eat like a Gangrene into the heart of Godlinesse.

One of Lady Margaret's close supporters was her nephew, Oliver Bromskill, who moved into her house, bringing his wife, Sarah. This must have been by 1633, as the vicar, John Morton, baptised their first daughter, also called Sarah, on 25 April that year, although Morton was also called upon to bury her in August. A son born the following year, Epaphras, also died when aged only 3. Other children survived long enough to be mentioned in Margaret's will in 1556, along with their cousins, the Abney family.

Oliver Bromskill was a Church of England clergyman, educated at Christ's College Cambridge, where he matriculated as a sizar in 1612, and ordained deacon in 1620 by Bishop Thomas Morton, when he subscribed to the Thirty-nine Articles, However diocesan records seem to have nothing further on Bromskill. The Victoria County History covering Coventry claims that Bromskill was curate of Sheriffhales and cites the Shropshire Calvinist theologian Richard Baxter and nonconformist historian Edmund Calamy in support. However, neither actually actually mentions Bromskill's post: Baxter tells us no more than that Bromskill "lived with that eminent saint the old lady Bromley." Writing about Margaret Bromley, the Puritan biographer Samuel Clarke refers to the Bromskill family as "Parishioners of the Congregation to which she was related." The only recorded curate at Sheriffhales in this period was called John Smith. The parish register merely names Bromskill, never giving him an ecclesiastical title. Calamy described Bromskill as "a judicious, solid Divine, and excellent Preacher, and holy Liver...His Deportment was grave and serious, his Temper mild, humble and peacable; but he was a little reserved.".

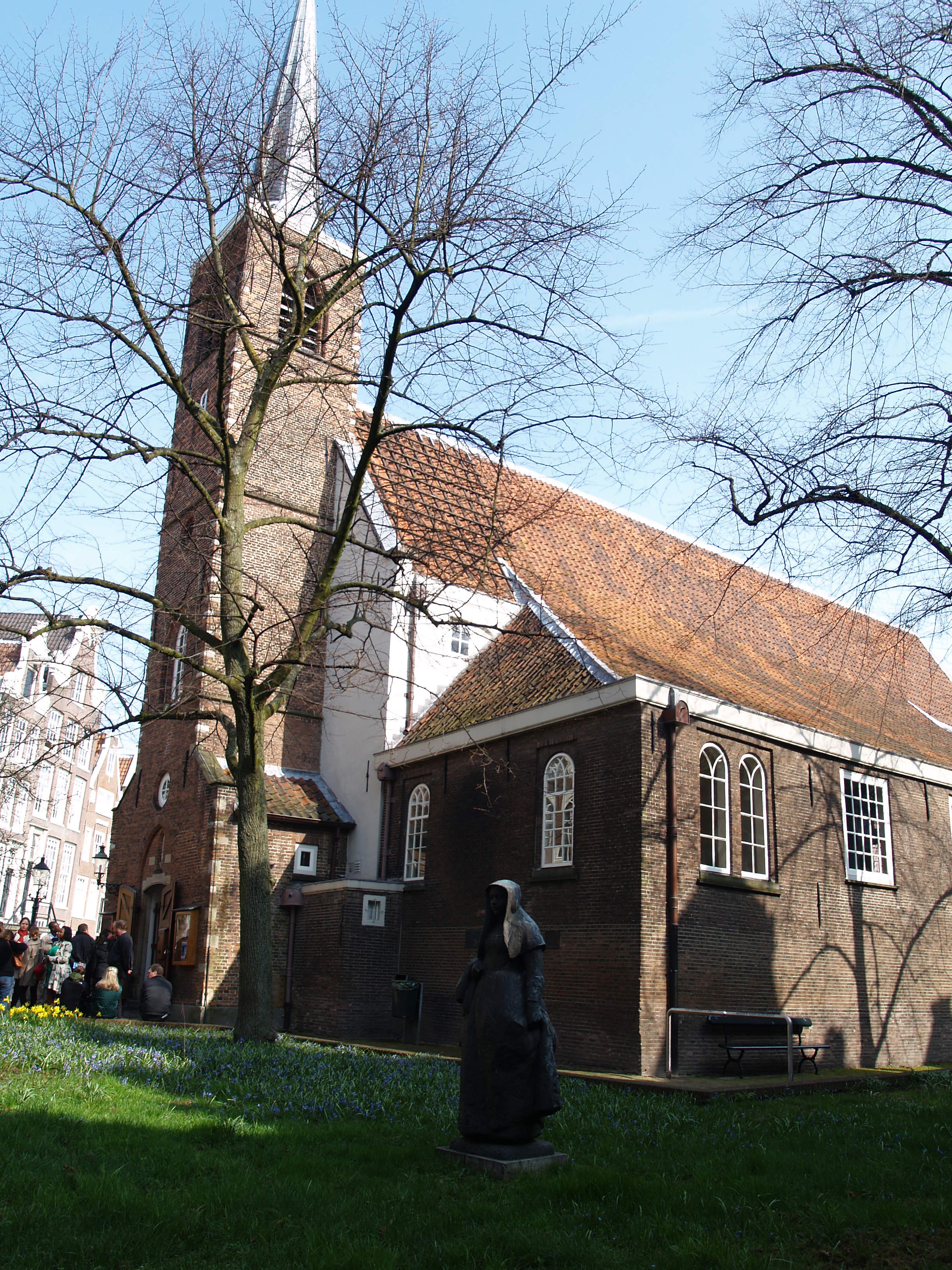
The English Reformed Church, Amsterdam, a refuge for Puritan ministers from England.

Julines Herring was forced to leave Shrewsbury in 1635 by a visitation initiated by William Laud himself. He moved with his family to Wrenbury to stay with Nicoll's widow (his wife's sister) and finally, in 1637, escaped the country to take up a post at the English Reformed Church, Amsterdam. Herring's departure marked a sharpening of conflict that culminated in the outbreak of civil war in 1642.

The sources all state or hint that the Puritan preachers who stayed at Sheriffhales extended their preaching to nearby parishes and there were notable Puritan strongholds in the locality. At Tong, for example, the lord of the manor was William Pierrepont, a leading Presbyterian who was sent on the eve of the Civil War by Parliament, together with Sir John Corbet and Richard More to secure Shropshire for Parliament.

=== English Civil War ===
The outbreak of the English Civil War perhaps prompted the Aston family to sell their advowson of St Mary's, Sheriffhales. On 4 October 1642, Walter Aston, 2nd Lord Aston of Forfar sold it to another Sir Richard Leveson, then lord of the manor of Sheriffshall, for £100 Leveson's financial position was usually precarious but, at this precise time he was more secure, as he had just recovered half his estates at Trentham, Lilleshall and Sheriffhales because of the death of Margaret Howard, widow of his godfather, the admiral Richard Leveson, from whom he had inherited. The sale took place as Shrewsbury was under the occupation of a royalist army that had already eroded support for Charles I through looting and forced requisitions. Considered variously "a sturdy royalist" by Michell, and "neutral at the outbreak of the First Civil War" by The History of Parliament Leveson was asked by his brother-in-law Richard Newport to help mediate between the two sides Newport soon gave the king £6000 for a peerage but he and Leveson were still discussing the prospects for peace at the end of November. The decision for King or Parliament was not easy, as both sides at the outset claimed to support both: the King in Parliament, with invocations of the Protestant religion and the rights of the people. Families were divided in their loyalties, as were some individuals. It took some time before the bitterness of actual bloodshed solidified the opposed factions. Leveson finally opted for the royalist side, was ruined financially and physically by the war and died, without issue, in 1661, without ever presenting a vicar to St Mary's, Sheriffhales.

Many Puritans left the royalist areas. Lady Margaret Bromley and the Bromskill family must have fled early, as Richard Baxter met them at Coventry, the regional parliamentarian stronghold, just after the Battle of Edgehill They never returned: Lady Margaret died and was buried at Loughborough in 1656, where she had lived with the rector, Oliver Bromskill. John Morton, the vicar of Sheriffhales, opted for the royalist side. The Puritan chronicler and controversialist John Vicars, based in London, heard of Morton and recorded a curious incident that he took to be a sign of divine displeasure with him.

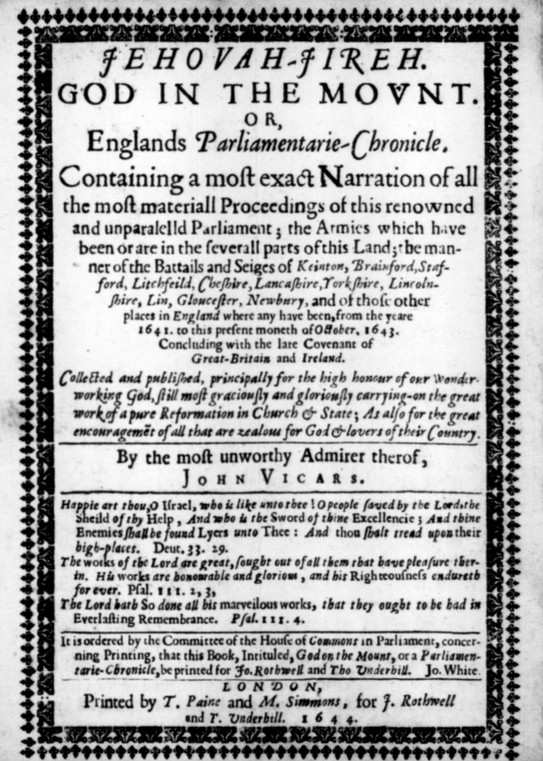
Cover of Jehovah-Jireh, a newspaper and commentary on the Wars of the Three Kingdoms, by John Vicars, 1644.

April the 23, 1643, being the Lord's day, one Master Morton Vicar of Sheriff-Hales preaching upon a portion of Scripture out of the 120 Psalme, took occasion thence to in his Sermon, to vent bitter imprecations against the Round-heads (that is, God's faithfullest servants and gracious Saints, and the Kings and the Parliaments loyall ans fastest friends) charging them with faction, rebellion, and such like opprobrious scandals, adding withall in express terms, that the Powder-plot, and other treasons that have been practised by the Papists, were nothing to this their late Round-new-invention. At which words (having stood halfe his time) he gasped and gaped as he stood in the Pulpit, and stared in his Auditors faces, but could not speake a word more for a good space after, the people all that while being amazed at this so suddain and strange dumb shew in him. At length, he (the said Master Morton) stooping down, as it were to take up somewhat at his feet, re-erected himself, and then said, let us give thanks for what we have heard, which he accordingly did, in a fumbling and hardly intelligible manner, and soon made an end.

Although there were no major battles in Shropshire, there were seven field engagements with over a thousand soldiers. There was also a great deal of, often bloody, fighting around fortified positions. The fighting often came into the environs of Sheriffhales, as it was close to the garrisons at Lillehall Abbey and Tong Castle. In August 1643 William Brereton and his Cheshire forces helped his Staffordshire allies to take Eccleshall Castle, and on 28 December they advanced to capture Tong Castle, although it changed hands several times subsequently. On 25 March 1644 an attempt by Parliamentarians to advance on Lilleshall led to a pitched battle between there and Longford with about 1500 involved. Even after the fall of Shrewsbury, in February 1645, and the decisive Parliamentary victory at the Battle of Naseby in June, operations continued locally. Lilleshall Abbey, garrisoned with about 160 troops on the king's behalf by Sir Richard Leveson, still held out. Its capture on 22 July 1645, was perhaps the most disruptive of the war around Sheriffhales. The Parliamentarian Thomas Malbon remarked that it came "after a great breache made in the same & the Governor slain." Before they stormed it the besiegers' artillery had demolished the towers, lady chapel, and north transept.

=== Under the Commonwealth ===
==== Survival of John Morton ====
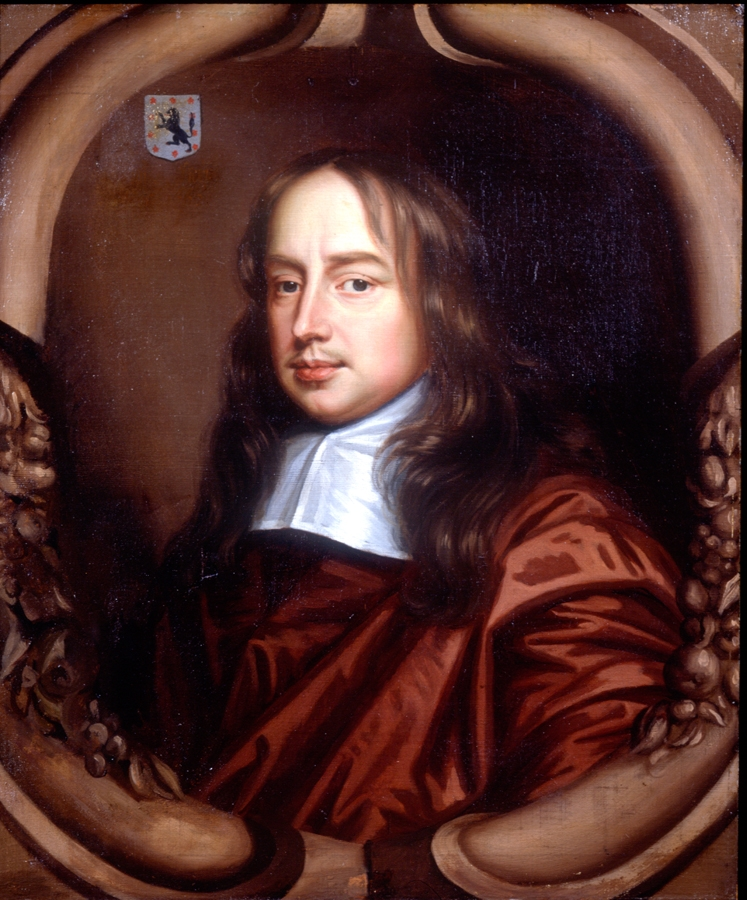
William Pierrepont of Tong Castle, (c. 1607 – 1678), the leading Puritan landowner in the area of Sheriffhales.

As the fighting subsided, the Parliamentarians purged the Church throughout Shropshire, with about forty clergy displaced during and after the retaking of the county, according to Auden's ecclesiastical history of the period. However, of John Morton, Auden reports that "though reported as bitter against Parliament at the beginning of the war, seems not to have been interfered with." At this point Shropshire was scheduled to undergo a reorganisation of church governance on Presbyterian lines. Shifnal and Tong were assigned to the third classis, centred on Bridgnorth, with William Pierrepont heading the list of lay presbyters. However, the classis never functioned fully and Sheriffhales was entirely excluded, presumably because of its ambiguous position, mainly in Staffordshire. Morton was thus spared any involvement in the reorganisation and the scrutiny it might have entailed.

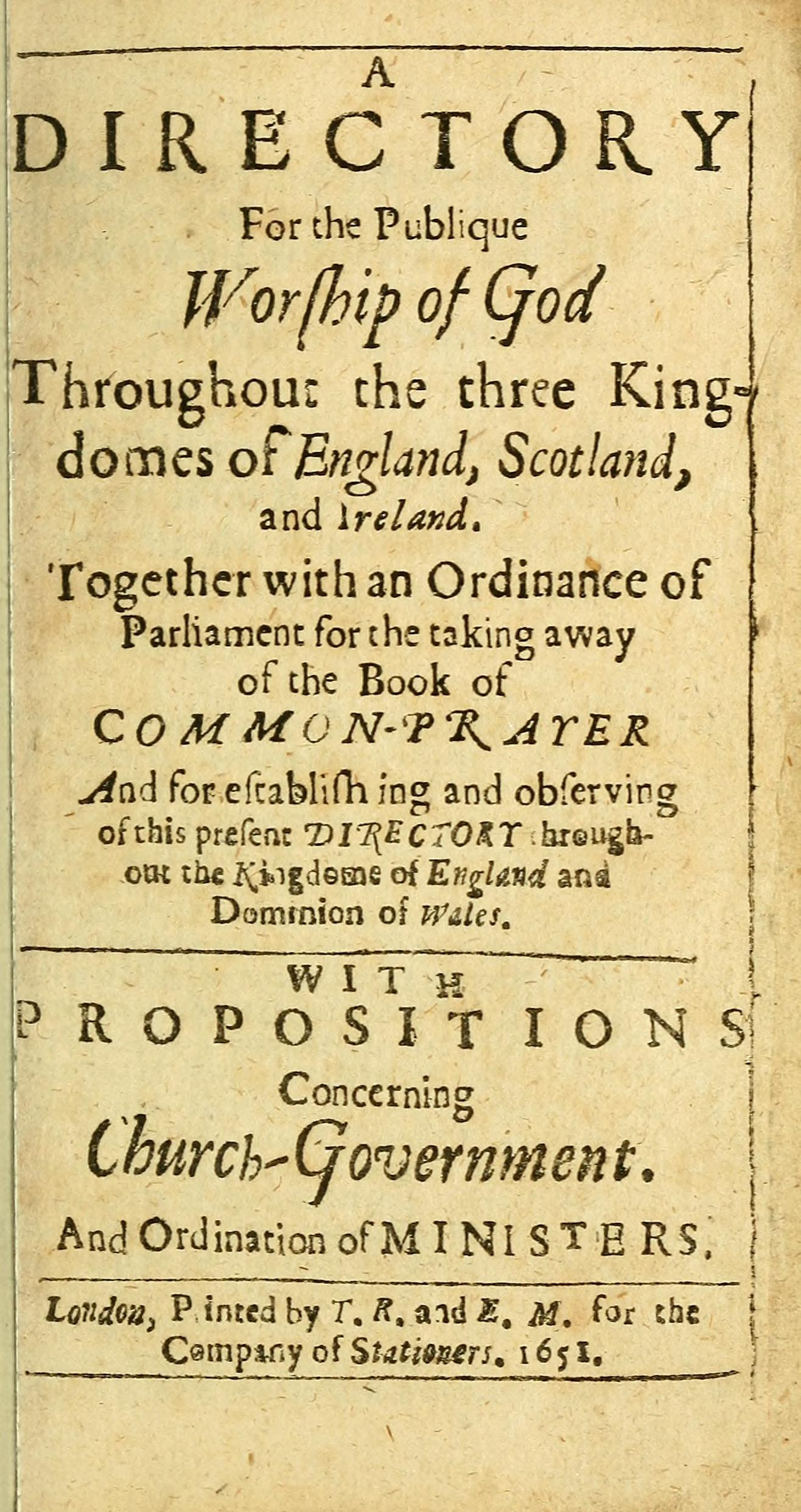
Title page of Directory for Public Worship

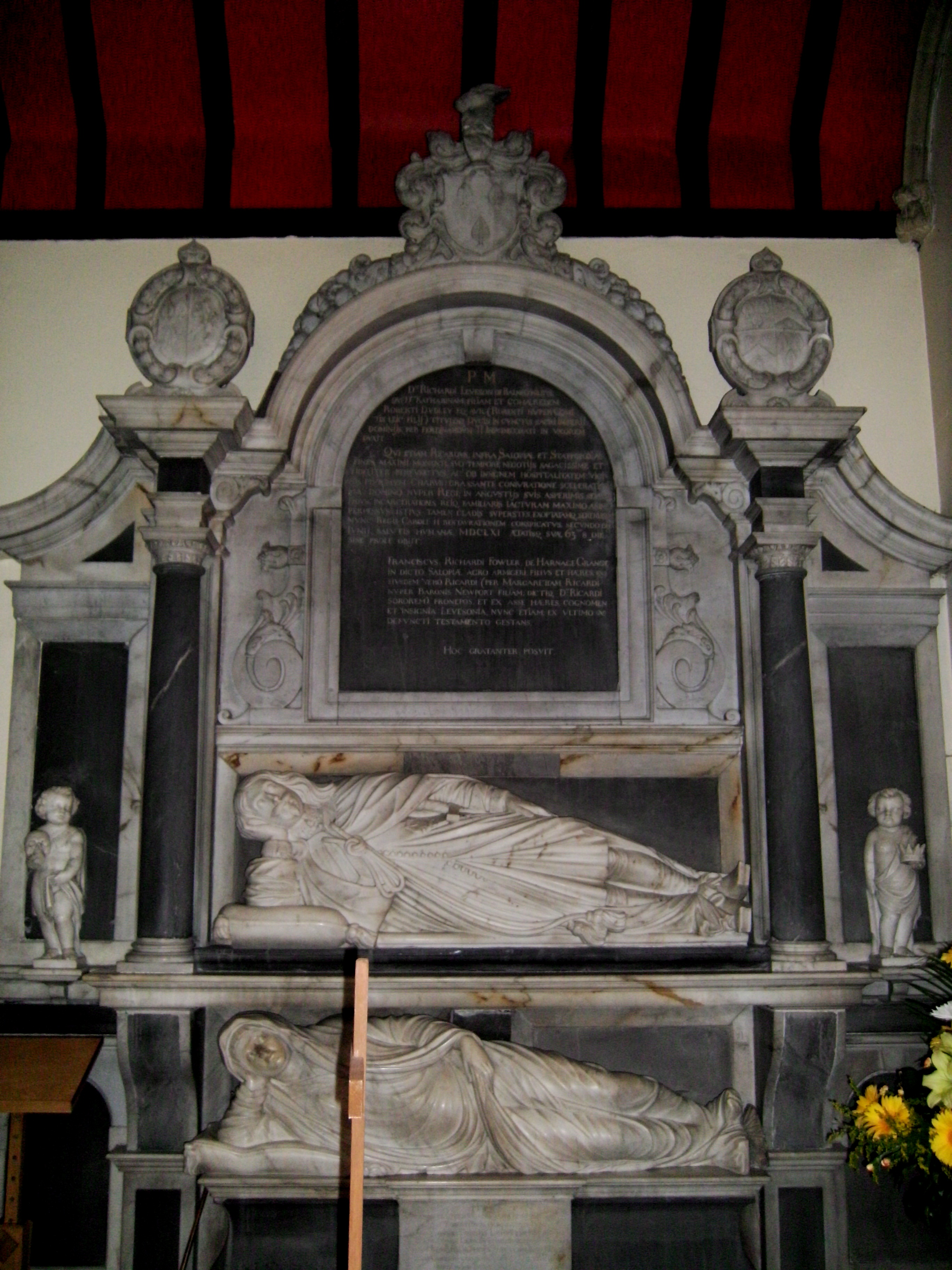
Memorial to Richard Leveson (1598–1661) and his wife Katherine Dudley. St Michael's church, Lilleshall, Shropshire.

Morton actually benefited greatly from the new dispensation, particularly from the ruin of Sir Richard Leveson at nearby Lilleshall. On 1 October 1646, Leveson, faced with a huge fine of £9,846, made an agreement with the Committee for Compounding with Delinquents, the body that negotiated settlements with royalist landowners whose estates had been sequestrated. To get the fine reduced to £6000 he agreed to pay £380 annually for ever. The sum was to be distributed among the ministers at five churches, apparently places where he held the rectories, and any others the Committee decided. The minister of "Sheriffs Hall" was to get £50 – second only to the minister of Lilleshall, who was promised £80. In addition Leveson had to transfer the great tithes of the churches to their ministers, essentially placing them in the same financial position as rectors, rather than vicars.

However, Morton would have been required to conduct services based on the Directory for Public Worship, a comprehensive description and prescription of the pattern of Presbyterian worship that was made obligatory under an Act of January 1645. Even before setting out the text of the directory the legislation also made the regulations governing the parish register clearer and firmer: it was to be made of vellum and had to contain a record of every birth, baptism, marriage or burial, and it was to be available for inspection and copying. Other requirements affected the layout of the church. The Communion Table was to be "decently covered, and so conveniently placed, that the Communicants may orderly sit about it, or at it." Fonts were not explicitly banned but baptisms had to be held "in the place of publique Worship, and in the face of the Congregation, where the people may most conveniently see and hear; and not in the places where Fonts in the time of Popery were unfitly and superstitiously placed." With these major exception to past practice, Morton remained undisturbed at Sheriffhales, considerably more prosperous, until his death. He was buried at Sheriffhales on 9 December 1649.

==== John Nott and the Puritan ascendancy ====
John Nott was appointed as minister to Sheriffhales in 1650 and in November of that year was named in the parish register alongside the churchwardens, John Glover and Anthony Wood. He is named in a number of sources as being the son of Charles Nott, vicar of Shelsley in Worcestershire. The benefice of Shelsley Beauchamp was never a vicarage but a rectory, so Charles Nott must have been the rector. The clergy database is currently not helpful in this regard, as there is a long gap in the list of rectors, stretching from 1611 until 1764. The name "Charles Nott" does not appear in the database at all. Charles Nott, known as the Parson of Shelsley Beauchamp, is notable as a leading figure in the movement of the Clubmen. They organised with makeshift weapons to resist the taxation and exactions of both armies. In Worcestershire in 1645, when Charles Nott emerged, this mostly applied to looting by scattered royalist garrisons left behind in the general retreat. On 5 March Charles Nott led an assembly of Clubmen to Woodbury Hill, near Great Witley, where they issued the Woodbury Declaration, declaring their intention

To retain the property of the subject by protecting and safeguarding our persons and estates by the mutual aid and assistance of each other against all murders, rapines, plunder, robberies, or violences which shall be offered by the soldier or any oppressor whatsoever...

It was possibly the Parson Charles Nott who married Mary Wympne at Shelsley Beauchamp in 1621, which fits with John Nott's birth year of 1624—25, as calculated from his memorial in Thame church, although this is uncertain.

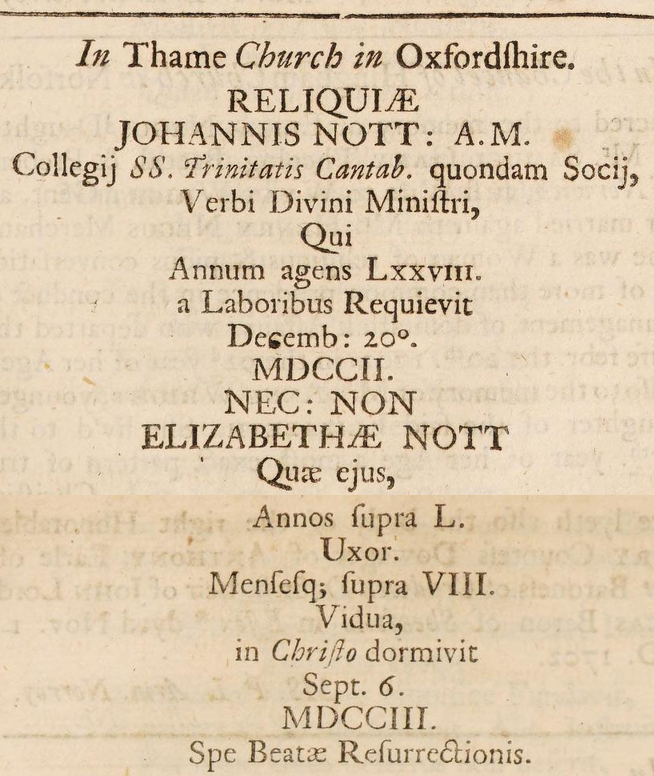
Entry for John Nott and his wife Elizabeth, née Sparry, in John Le Neve, Monumenta Anglicana, 1717. Translation: The remains of John Nott MA, former fellow of Trinity College, Cambridge, minister of the Divine Word, who in the 78th year of his life rested from his labours, 20 December 1702. Also of Elizabeth Nott who was his wife for more than 50 years, his widow for 8 months, and fell asleep in Christ 6 September 1703, in hope of the Blessed Resurrection.

John Nott was educated at Emmanuel College, Cambridge from November 1642 until May 1645, when he migrated to Trinity College, at about the time his father was involved in the Clubmen's activities. At that point Trinity College was undergoing a purge, instigated in 1644 by the Earl of Manchester. Most of the fellows lost their positions and the master, Thomas Comber, was replaced by Thomas Hill, who had perhaps been master of Emmanuel. Nott moved at about the time Hill was appointed. He graduated BA and became a Scholar around 1646 and a Fellow the following year. By 1650, before his appointment at Sheriffhales, Nott was working at Wolverhampton as assistant to Ambrose Sparry, who was minister at the former St Peter's Collegiate Church. The source of income was precarious and began to dry up soon after Nott moved on. The clergy at the church, and several surrounding parishes were paid from the sequestered estate of Colonel Thomas Leveson who had fled abroad, making it impossible for the Compounding Committee to come to a proper settlement with him.

Nott was presented to Sheriffhales under the Great Seal on 30 May 1650 It would not be possible to accept the post unless he had previously taken the Oath of Engagement. This was introduced by an Act of 2 January 1650 and ran:

I Do declare and promise, That I will be true and faithful to the Commonwealth of England, as it is now Established, without a King or House of Lords.

The oath drove a wedge between Independents or Congregationalists and the Presbyterians: the latter tended to have scruples about breaking their former adherence to the Solemn League and Covenant of 1643, which envisaged a king presiding over a Presbyterian Church of England.

Under the terms of Sir Richard Leveson's agreement with the Compounding Committee, Nott was assigned the great tithes, and would also have received the £50 enhancement to the vicarage, so the Sheriffhales appointment would have marked a major improvement in his material circumstances. He went back to Wolverhampton to wed Elizabeth Sparry on 26 September 1650. Elizabeth was the daughter of John Sparry and Ambrose Sparry's 20-year old sister. A year later Charles Stuart's Scottish Presbyterian army camped at Tong Heath, south-east of Sheriffhales, on its way to a disastrous defeat at the Battle of Worcester on 3 September 1651. The local confusion and disruption was compounded by fleeing troops, who stopped at Tong again on their way back to Scotland, and by the Parliamentarian search for the fugitive Charles, who passed through, among other places, Stourbridge, White Ladies, Madeley, Shropshire, Boscobel House and Moseley Old Hall.

The Notts' first child, named Elizabeth like her mother, was baptised just as the chaos subsided, on 30 October 1651 More children followed: John on 22 March 1653, Mary on 2 December 1654, another Elizabeth on 15 July 1656, although there is no indication the first had died. When Penelope Nott was baptised on 15 November 1657, the register gives the details not only that she was born five days earlier but that it was at 2:00. The arrival in March 1660 of Charles Nott, was recorded with similar precision, as was that of Samuel in March 1662 These were the earliest entries in Sheriffhales register which gave details of birth dates and times, although this had been a legal requirement since the 1645 Act introducing the Directory.

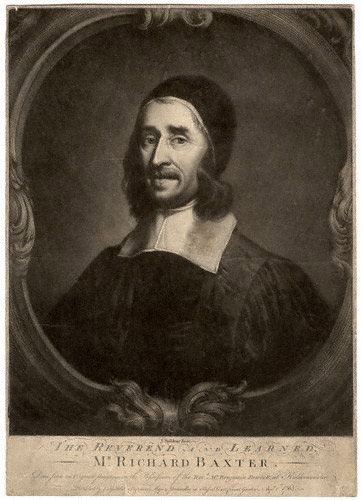
18th-century engraving of Richard Baxter, after a 17th-century portrait by John Riley. Baxter, a key Presbyterian theologian, was Shropshire native, although he made his name as minister of Kidderminster, in Worcestershire.

Meanwhile, Nott was confirmed as minister of Sheriffhales in 1652 by the Westminster Assembly, the body charged with reorganizing the Church of England since 1643. The Assembly was becoming increasingly isolated from the onrush of events. The Presbyterian Members of Parliament, the Assembly's political base, had been systematically removed from the House of Commons on 6 December 1648 in Pride's Purge, in preparation for the Trial of Charles I. William Pierrepont of Tong, for example, was forced out of Parliament, although he continued to be influential as a friend of Oliver Cromwell and later Richard Cromwell, as well as a lay member of the Assembly. Since the Purge, the Independents, who supported Cromwell, had gained ever greater influence. The end of the Assembly and the collapse of Presbyterian governance led to a series of practical issues around coordinating local churches – primarily how to impose uniform church discipline if there was no authority above the local level. One sanction used by ministers was exclusion from the Lord's Supper, which could be side-stepped simply by going to another church. There was also a problem in securing more than local recognition for the ordination of ministers. Richard Baxter sought a solution by creating a wider framework for cooperation, originally intended to cover just his own county of Worcestershire. Despite being in Staffordshire and Shropshire, Sheriffhales was part of this association from the outset. By the time the association was formalised May 1653, the signatories included a considerable number of ministers in neighbouring counties: John Nott, rendered as Knott, and described as the "teacher at Sheriff Hales." was one of them.

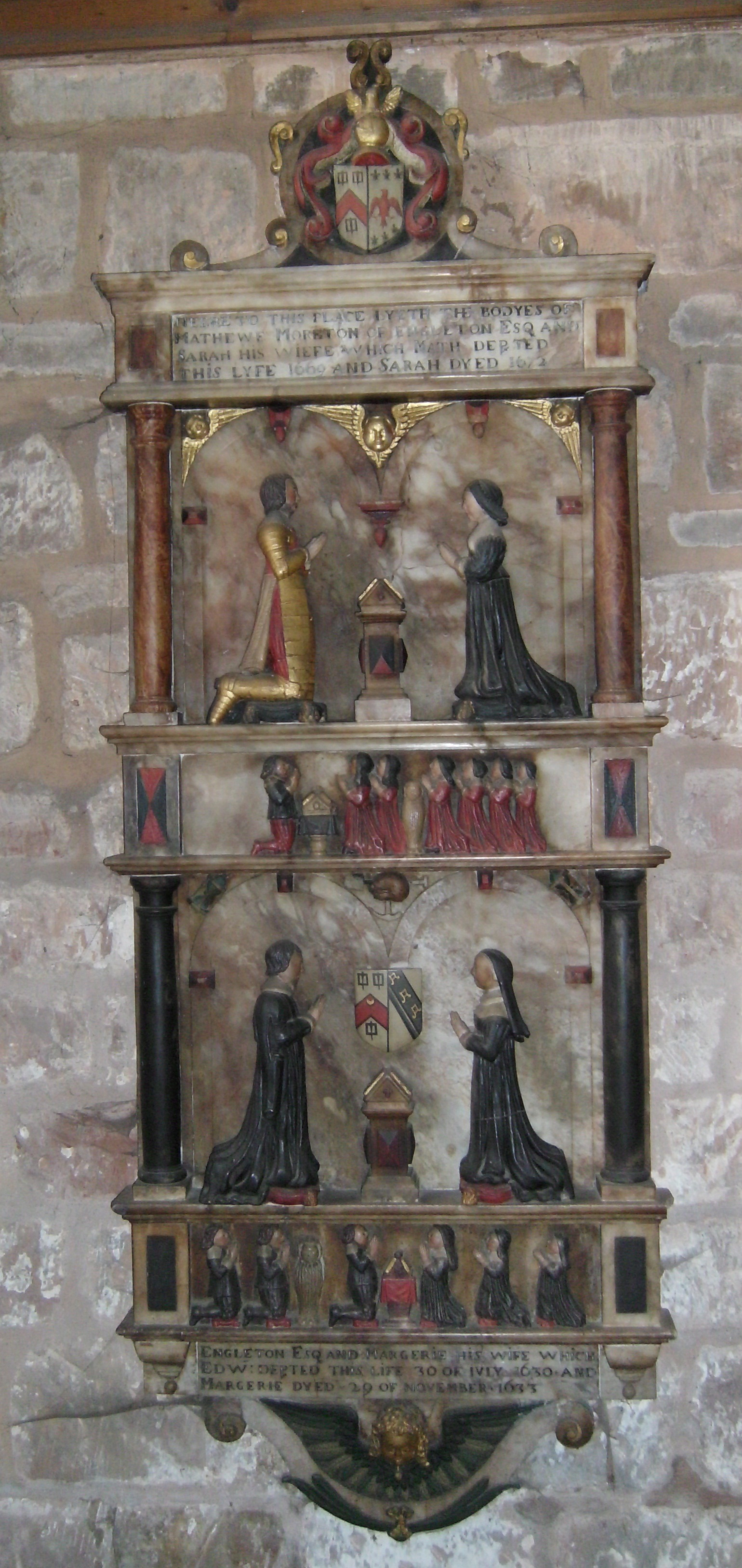
Memorial to Mathew and Sarah Moreton (top) and Edward and Margery Moreton (lower panel), in St Mary's and St Chad's church, Brewood. Mathew was a prominent Staffordshire magistrate under the Commonwealth.

The Sheriffhales parish register of marriages 1654–1655 features two certificates from a local Justice of the Peace. These were in accord with an Act of 1653 passed by Nominated Assembly, known to its royalist detractors as the Barebones Parliament. Convened by Oliver Cromwell, its sole Act, passed in August moved marriage from the remit of the Church to that of local government, although the couple still had to swear an oath to God before the magistrate issued a certificate of marriage, priced at twelve pence. The Sheriffhales examples were both signed and sealed at Gnosall by Mathew Moreton: a long serving Staffordshire JP, he was a resident of Engleton in Brewood parish.

A new volume of the register was begun in 1657 and inside the cover is a list of collections made among the congregation for good causes. The donations are not dated but the editor thought they might relate to the years 1658–1662, which is borne out by references to some easily dated public events. The second entry on the list names Edgbaston church as the recipient of 5s. 5d. and this corresponds to a collection authorised in 1658 by the Council of State, to help replace the building destroyed in the Civil War. Towards the end of the list, Condover church is reported as receiving 4s. 4. It is known that its nave and north aisle collapsed in November 1660. Afterwards comes a record of 4s. 10d. donated for a fire near Whitehall, the seat of government, which could correspond to either or both the fires reported there in 1661–1662, in which offices and living quarters were damaged. Special collections seem to have been quite frequent, with 26 over a period of about four years, and many were for individuals, who are harder to trace and explain than the public disasters. Such collections continued well after was Nott was ejected from Sheriffhales in 1662.

== Stuart Restoration ==
=== Rebuilding of the church ===
In 1661 St Mary's Church was largely rebuilt, a construction programme initiated by the churchwardens at the time: John Smith and Jeffery Backhouse. Their initials are cut into a roof beam of the nave, together with the year. The work largely established the present footprint of the church, with a large nave divided from the north aisle by a row of four, variously-sized arches, allegedly recycled from Lilleshall Abbey. The only subsequent change to the ground plan came when the tower collapsed in about 1717. Two key fittings, the pulpit and font, also seem to date from the 1661 rebuilding. There would also have been a complete replacement of the seating with box pews, an arrangement which lasted until 1894. A superficial feature, but one that would have changed the entire feel of the church, was the predominance of plastered surfaces on walls and ceilings, which also persisted until the Victorian restoration. Although the chancel occupied its present position, it was left at the same level as the nave.

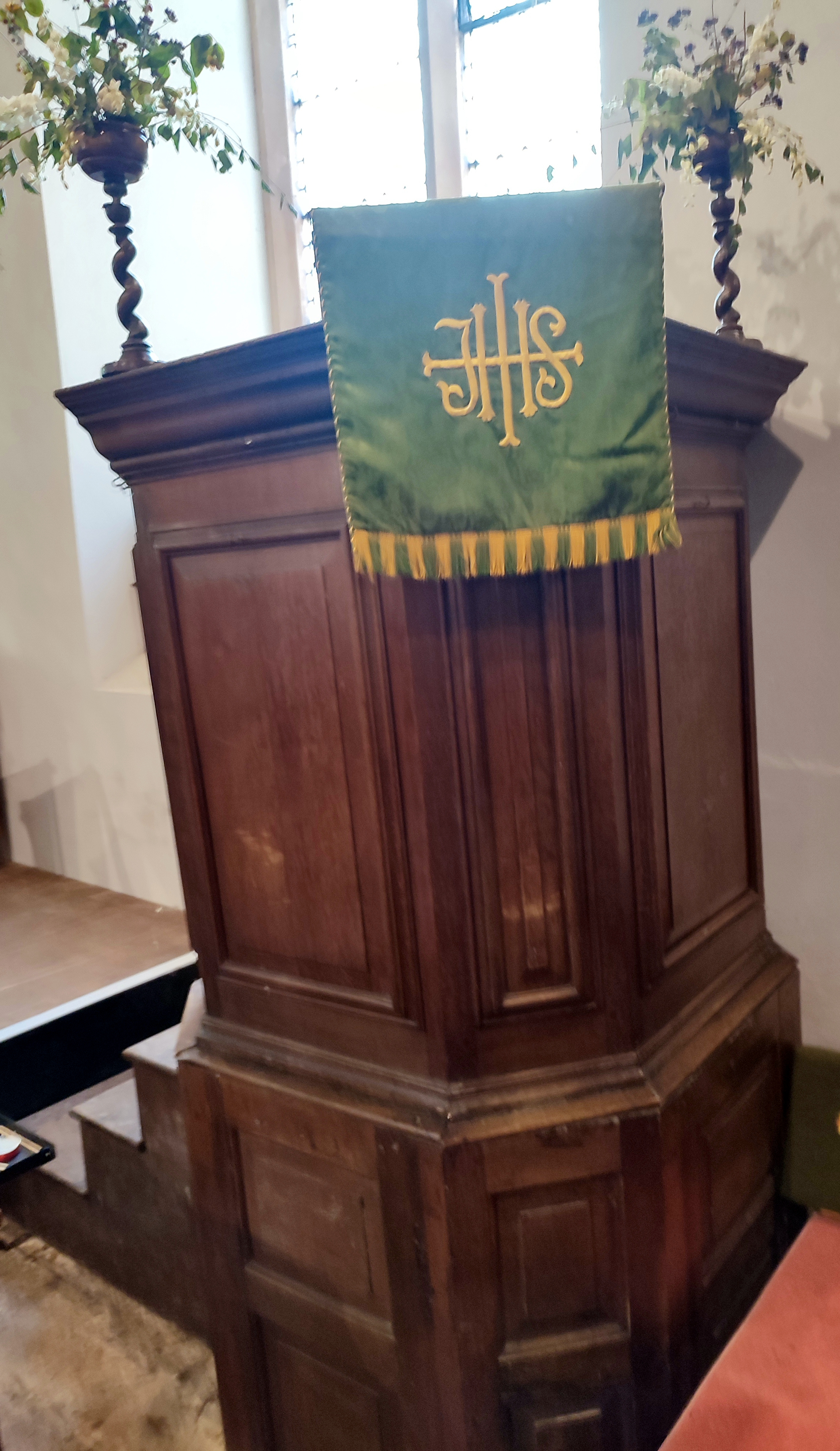
Exterior of the pulpit, which is elevated by four steps.

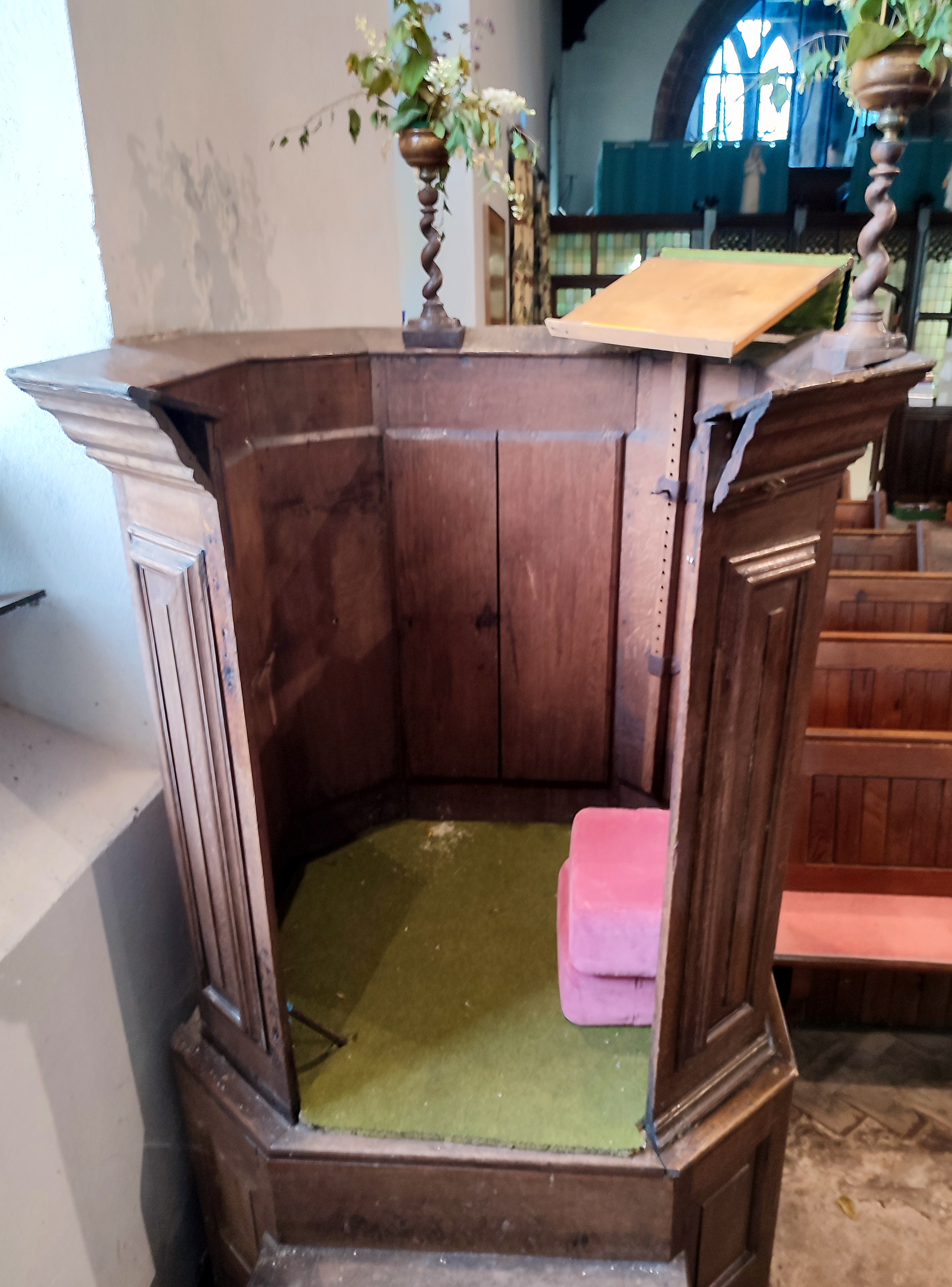
Interior view of the 17th century pulpit.

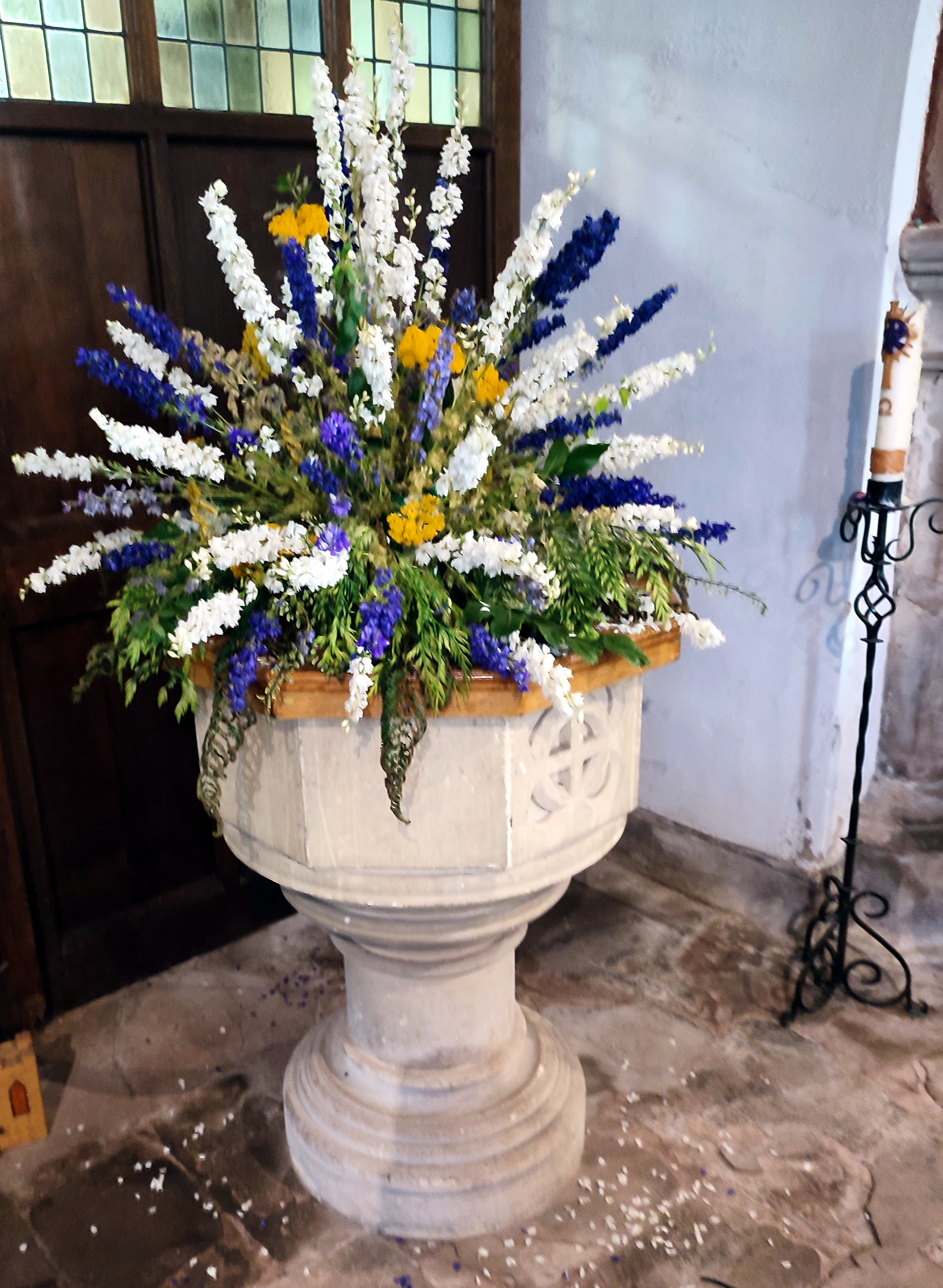
The font, which possibly dates from the 1661rebuilding

=== Great Ejection ===
John Nott lost the parish of Sheriffhales at the Great Ejection of 1662. After the Stuart Restoration Puritans were outmanoeuvred and an Act of Uniformity passed on 19 May 1662 to reimpose the Book of Common Prayer and the Epicopacy of the Church of England. Although Charles II had announced his commitment to religious freedom in the Declaration of Breda, the changes were made compulsory and enforced by penalties. Each clergymen was ordered not only to use the prayerbook but also, after a morning or evening service, "openly and publiquely before the congregation there assembled declare his open and unfeigned assent and consent to the use of all things there contained." Any who failed to do so was to be deprived of his benefice and the patron could "present or collate to the same as though the person or persons so offending or neglecting were dead." The deadline of 24 August 1662 was set for incumbents to make the declaration.

Nott evidently failed to comply with the Act of Uniformity and his name was struck out, with several others, from the Liber Cleri, the diocesan record of clergy, on 29 September. The benefice of Sheriffhales was considered vacant. Nott went on to "preach publicly in a chapel near Hadly 3 or 4 years, as long as he was suffered": it is not known if this was the Hadley near Wellington, Shropshire. Then he acted as chaplain to Richard Hampden, a member of the Cavalier Parliament who had remained resolutely Presbyterian and refused to attend parish Communion. Not until 1688, with the passing of the Toleration Act was he able to return to public preaching at Thame in Oxfordshire, where he died in 1702.

=== Restoration vicars ===
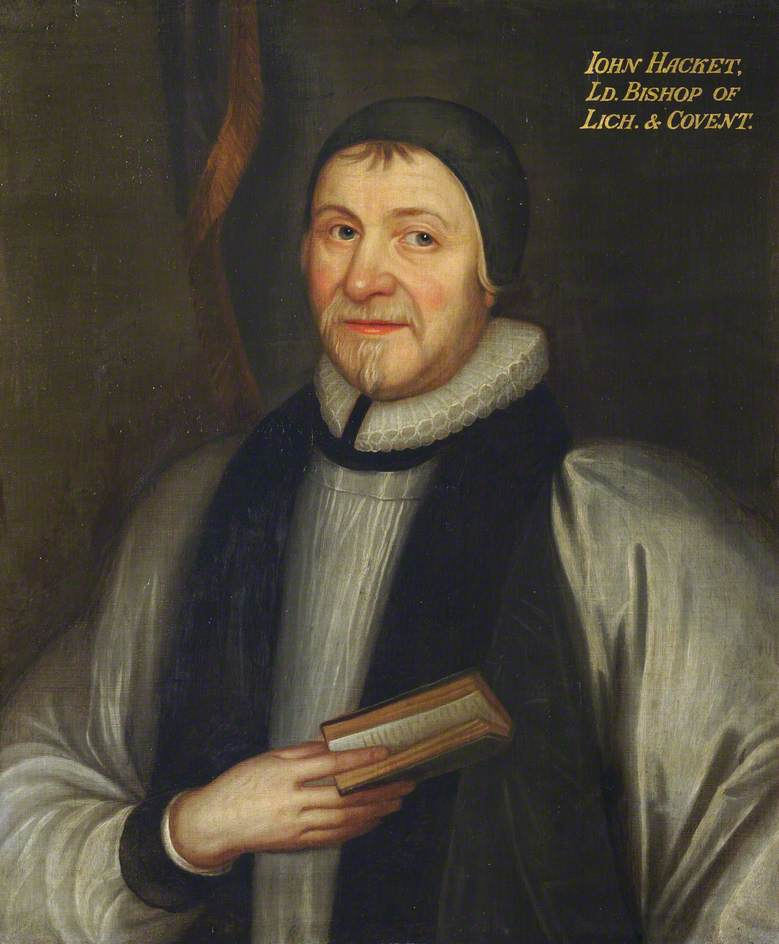
Bishop John Hacket, the first bishop of Lichfield and Coventry elected after the Stuart Restoration.

==== William Peers ====
William Peers was instituted vicar of Sheriffhales on 15 December 1662. In the register the vicar's surname is consistently rendered Pierce, while the Cambridge alumni database renders it as Peirse, which might indicate the pronunciation. Like Nott, his Puritan predecessor, Peers had studied at Emmanuel College, where he was admitted as a pensioner in 1656. He graduated BA in 1659 or 1660, so his university education had probably been entirely under the Commonwealth: Emmanuel had a reputation more than thirty years old as one of what Laud called the "nurseries of Puritanism." However, Emmanuel was distinctly Presbyterian and its leadership was unhappy with both with the Engagement and the Restoration: William Sancroft, a leading and popular member, was forced out in July 1651 for evading the Engagement. Discipline loosened to the extent that some students had to be admonished for playing cards in the college. No less than 155 Emmanuel alumni lost their posts in the Great Ejection. Peers however became vicar of Sheriffhales because of it.

Peers was ordained a deacon at St Mary's Church, Lichfield on 14 December 1662 by Bishop John Hacket. He was then ordained priest on the same day: the day before he was instituted as vicar of Sheriffhales. This hurried ordination process seems to have been normal in the diocese during the 1661–1662 period. Large numbers of clergy were ejected from their livings and replacements required urgently. Peers was presented by Richard Fowler of Harnage Grange, the father and guardian Francis Fowler. After Sir Richard Leveson's death in 1661, he had left his estates, including the manor, rectory and advowson of Sheriffhales church, to Margaret Fowler, his niece, and her husband Francis. As Francis was under age, the advowson was exercised by his father, Richard. Peers was not actually inducted into the benefice, ie admitted to its temporalities until 1 January 1663. The fact was attested by the churchwardens, John Smith and Jeffrey Backhouse in the parish register: this was the first entry in the register since 7 September. In 1665 the vicarage was worth only £45 per annum.

There is no indication in the register that Peers ever married or had children. Little disturbs the regular life cycle of the parishioners except a note that John Talbot of Chadwell left £5 for the interest to be distributed to the poor of the parish in the form of a bread ration every Good Friday. Collections for good causes outside the parish probably continued under Peers, and one recorded on the inside back cover of the register, of 12 shillings for a fire at the Royal Foundation of St Katharine, can be dated to 1672. In the same year, during a temporary lull in discrimination brought about by the Declaration of Indulgence, Michael Old of Sheriffhales sought permission to open his house as a Presbyterian meeting house, a sign that Puritanism was not dead in the parish. Peers served the parish of Sheriffhales for almost a decade, until his own funeral was registered on 19 January 1673, when he was probably in his mid-thirties.

==== George Plaxton ====
George Plaxton was instituted vicar of Sheriffhales on 8 July 1673 by Bishop Thomas Wood. He was presented by Sir William Leveson Gower, a grand-nephew of Sir Richard Leveson, but he was not inducted into the benefice until 12 November. Four days later he stood before his congregation to make the statutory declaration of assent and consent to the liturgy and doctrine of the Church of England. Between his institution and induction at Sheriffhales, on 20 October, Plaxton had been instituted and admitted as Rector of Kynnersley, a few miles north-west of Sheriffhales on the Weald Moors. He was to retain his rectory throughout and beyond his time as vicar of Sheriffhales.

Plaxton was a Yorkshireman: born at Wressle in the East Riding in 1647 or 1648. He was educated at Pocklington School where he would probably have been a classmate of William Gower, who was to inherit the Leveson estates in Staffordshire and Shropshire in 1668 and add Leveson to his name. In 1666 Plaxton matriculated at St John's College, Cambridge, which at that time effectively controlled Pocklington School. Since the Restoration the college had been under the mastership of Peter Gunning, who had in 1643 been expelled from it for preaching against the Solemn League and Covenant. He took the college into the phase the Victoria County History describes as "Anglican and Tory," which also describes Plaxton himself.

Plaxton graduated BA in 1670 and on 29 May of that year was ordained deacon at York. Exactly a week later he was placed on the payroll of the Leveson Gower household. He had both been ordained priest and received his MA by the time he was instituted at Sheriffhales.

Plaxton seems to have resided at Sheriffhales, rather than Kynnersley, as that is where he married and where most of his children were born. He married Alice Perratt at St Mary's Sheriffhales on 26 September 1677. The Perratt or Perrat family were from York and evidently made a close connection with the Plaxtons, as later a Thomas Perrott was to marry George and Alice's daughter Anastasia. According to the Sheriffhales register William, their first son was baptised on 29 December 1678. However, it also records another son named William, baptised on 6 December 1679 The details then become hazy and Arthur Michell, one of his successors as vicar, referred to "G. Plaxton, who from 1679 to 1690 failed to make proper entries" in the parish registers. Later, after he left Sheriffhales for Donington Plaxton had some family details inserted into the register of St Cuthbert's Church there. There are listed William, born in 1678 but recorded as baptised on 26 December; Jane, who was born in December 1679 (casting doubt on the second William) but died young in 1685; young George, born in 1681; John, who was born on 12 March 1683 and baptised immediately because he seemed so weak; Anastasia, born on Easter Day in 1686; Anna, born in 1688. All of these were actually born at Sheriffhales, although there is no mention of them in the register there, except for William. Only Charles was born at Donington, on 3 February 1691, and baptised on 3 March.

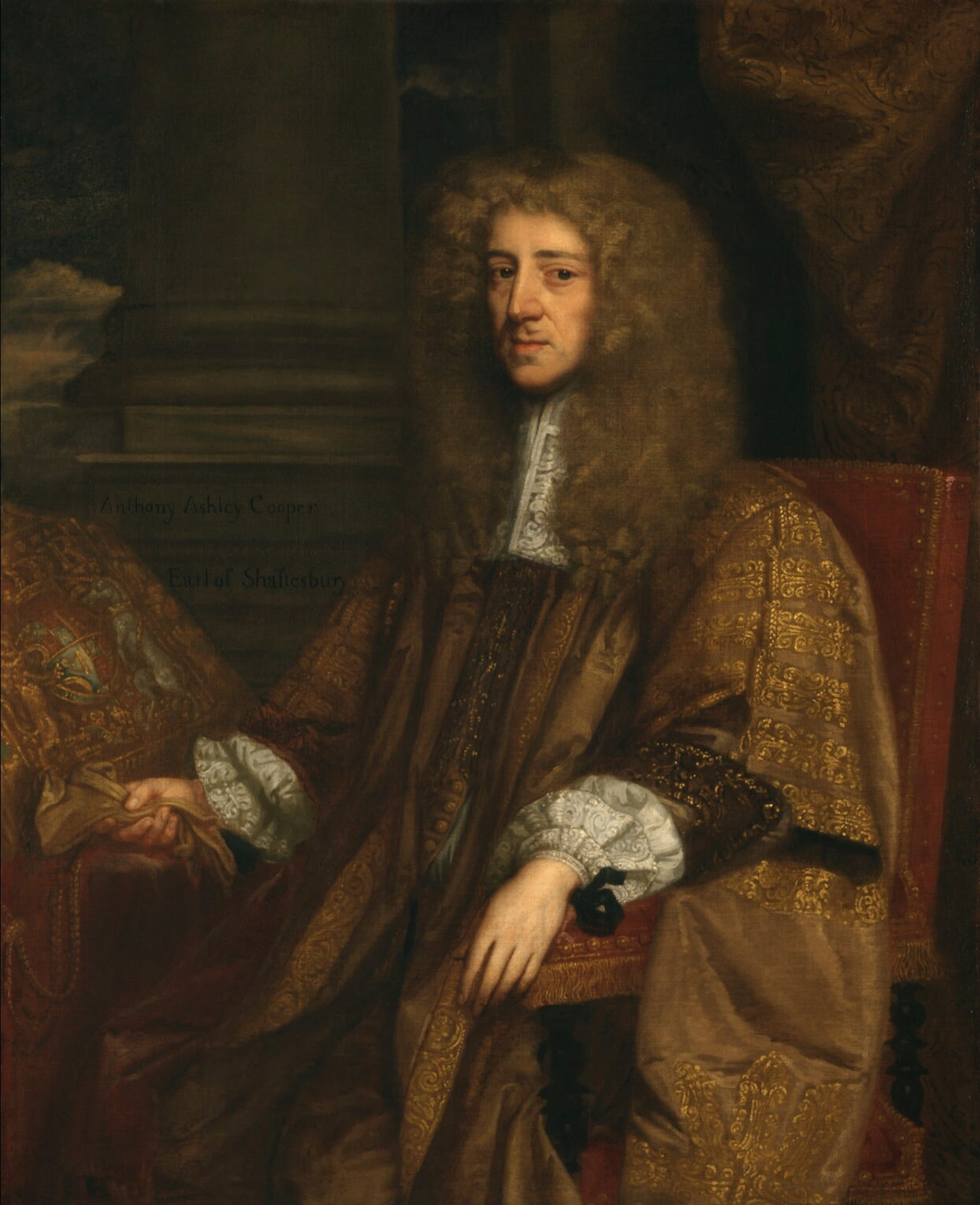
Portrait by John Greenhill of Anthony Ashley-Cooper, 1st Earl of Shaftesbury, leader of the Whig opposition.

James Scott, Duke of Monmouth and Buccleuch, circa 1683. Possibly after Willem Wissing. NPG 151. © National Portrait Gallery, London.

From 1679 to 1684 Plaxton compiled the rental accounts for the Leveson Gower estates and also witnessed leases, audited accounts and advised in the selection of tenants. J R Wordie, historian of the management of the Leveson Gower estates, characterisd Plaxton's relationship with Leveson Gower as "more that of a respectful friend than an employee." Leveson Gower was an active politician and represented Newcastle-under-Lyme, conveniently close to the family's seat at Trentham, from 1675 to 1681, and then Shropshire until 1685. Initially, like Plaxton, he was a Tory, sympathetic to Charles II but the Exclusion issue, pushed him toward the Whig opposition, which promoted legislation to ensure that the king's Catholic brother, James, Duke of York, could not succeed him. Leveson Gower came to believe: "Nothing less than a firm union among all Protestants in this nation can be sufficient" Some time in the late 1670s had allowed John Woodhouse, a Presbyterian minister to open dissenting academy, intended to circumvent the ban on university education for nonconformists, to open in the Sheriffhales manor house,

Early in 1682 Leveson Gower was named as a supporter of dissenters and in March Leoline Jenkins, Secretary of State, took steps to set up a spy network to keep him under surveillance. Leveson Gower did nothing to allay suspicions and spies reported him receiving and entertaining Duke of Monmouth, the Whig candidate for the succession, at Trentham on his northward progress to Chester in early September 1682, and on his return south on 19 September, accompanying him to Stafford, where he received a rapturous reception but was then arrested on the king's orders. Leveson Gower was among those who offered to stand bail for him, not once but twice.

The Loyal Speech of George Plaxtone MA: a pamphlet welcoming the accession of James VII and II in 1685.

Leveson Gower and George Plaxton were now clearly on opposite sides.John Woodhouse at the dissenting academy came under intense pressure after the discovery of the Rye House Plot of 1683 that created a critical situation. Plaxton wrote a damning letter about him which he sent in October to George Weld, a deputy lieutenant of Shropshire. It soon landed, as was intended, on Secretary Jenkins' desk, requesting that his licence to teach be revoked, "for under colour of it he vends his counterfeit wares and traffics in faction."

When James VII and II succeeded to the throne in 1685 Plaxton welcomed the event from the pulpit and in print. He is generally assumed to be the author of The Loyal Speech of G. Plaxtone, MA, upon the Proclamation of King James II, which appeared under his name and mentions the circumstantial details that he was minister of Sheriffhales and gave the speech at Shifnal. wrongly placing the two places in the same county. He greeted the new king in rapturous terms, praising the entire Stuart dynasty.

After the flight of James II and the accession of the joint monarchs William III and Mary II, Leveson Gower began to move back to the Tories, particularly as he was a strong supporter of Anne as potential successor. If there had ever been a breach between him and Plaxton, it was soon repaired and Plaxton sought more on the estates. By February 1690 he was bemoaning the conflict of interests that made it hard for him to act against tenants at Sheriffhales who were encroaching on Leveson Gower's heath.

I can the better act for you in the improvement of this manor when no way ties to them, as now I am. being their Vicar. But being once removed I can tell how to manage them, both as to the heath and other matters.

In May he proposed that he spend a month or two a year as Leveson Gower's assistant estate manager. Plaxton moved from Sheriffhales in the summer of 1690 to become Rector of Donington, another parish where the advowson belonged to Leveson Gower. This was probably Leveson Gower's response to Plaxton's request. Donington in the early modern period remained a scattering of hamlets across a wide tract of common lands, less demanding because small and less likely to clash with Plaxton's long-term project of driving out fixed-term leases and replacing them with tenancies at will Although he resigned Sheriffhales, Plaxton kept his rectory at Kynnersley until 1703.

=== Dissent and the Academy ===
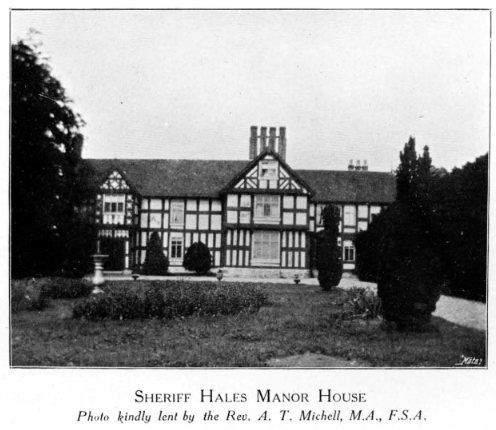
The manor house at Sheriffhales, c. 1900 - a dissenting academy under John Woodhouse, late 17th Century. The photo was provided by Arthur Tompson Michell to the Congregational Historical Society.

Sheriffhales is well known in Nonconformist history as the site of one of the dissenting academies founded by John Woodhouse, a Presbyterian minister and preacher. He was probably the son of John Woodhouse of The Wodehouse at Wombourne, Staffordshire. He seems to have entered Trinity College, Cambridge, in 1655 but never graduated. In 1669 he was resident at Saxelbye in Leicestershire, said to have been silenced in Nottinghamshire. Meanwhile, on 27 November 1667, while he was living at Saxelbye, he had married Mary Hubbert, daughter of William Hubbert, an army officer. In 1675 the couple were living at Wartnaby when Woodhouse was licensed by the Archbishop of Canterbury, then Gilbert Sheldon, to teach grammar in the dioceses of Lincoln, Lichfield and Hereford. Shortly afterwards, Woodhouse was conducting his academy in Sheriffhales manor house, which had been built in the late 16th and 17th centuries and was generally rented out by the lord of the manor, at this time Sir William Leveson Gower. It is a four-bayed structure, just west of the church.

The precise opening date of the Sheriffhales academy is debatable. Early historians of the dissenting academies tended to favour a very early date, notably Irene Parker who thought it was in operation from 1663–1697. Woodhouse's time in Leicestershire seems to preclude such an early date at Sheriffhales. A recent thesis by Mark Burden implies 1675, when Woodhouse received his licence to teach grammar, as the earliest possible date The earliest mention of John and Mary Woodhouse in the Sheriffhales parish register is 12 January 1677, when their son John was baptised by George Plaxton. Burden finds there is no evidence for teaching a university-style curriculum before 1680. This university learning was essential if the nonconformist students were to circumvent the ban on their entry to the two English Universities, which demanded an oath of allegiance to the Church of England. Joshua Toulmin, a radical nonconformist theologian and historian, reported in 1814 on the curriculum followed by Woodhouse, with lectures in logic, anatomy and mathematics, followed by physics, ethics and rhetoric, as well as Greek and Hebrew. Toulmin also claimed that there were more professionally-oriented lectures for those going on to become lawyers or ministers. He stressed that:

Practical exercises accompanied the course of lectures; and the students were employed at times in surveying land, composing almanacks, making sun-dials of different constructions, and dissecting animals.

Toulmin included a lengthy account of the texts generally read and discussed by the students. He cited as his source a manuscript from a John Woodhouse Crompton of Birmingham, which is no longer extant. Irene Parker and other authors largely repeated or condensed Toulmin's account of the curriculum. A contemporary critic of the academy was Thomas Foley who was dissatisfied with Woodhouse's skills in mathematics. However Foley was in revolt at the restrictions imposed by his Puritan father, rejected ethics as a pursuit unsuitable for a gentleman, and grew up to be a Tory squire.

The Trial of William, Lord Russell, in 1683 by Sir George Hayter, painted in 1825

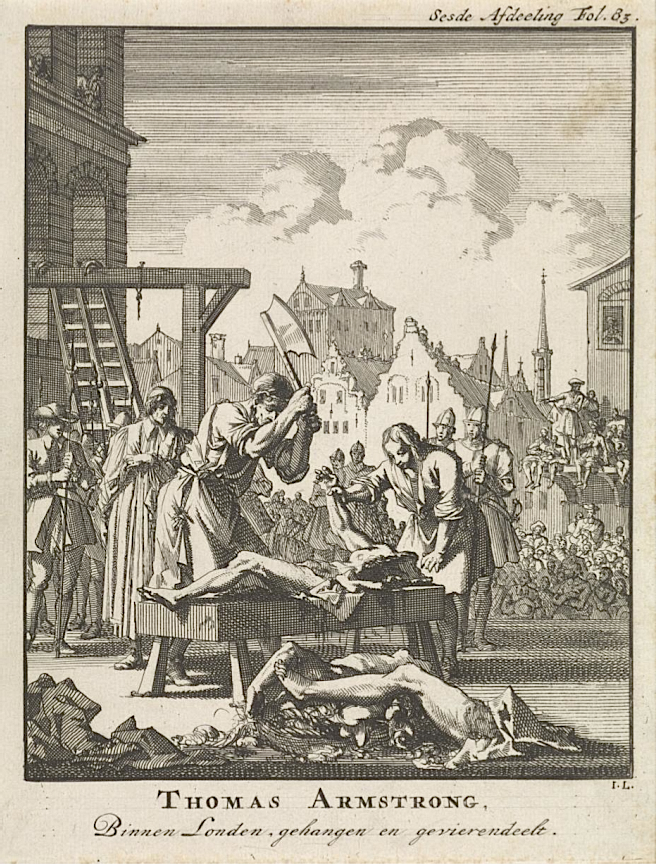
Engraving attributed to Jan Luyken depicting the execution of Sir Thomas Armstrong in 1684.

Student discontent was the least of Woodhouse's problems. He was sucked into the whirlpool of spying and rumour that stemmed from the discovery of the Rye House Plot in June 1683. In early July he was questioned on his activities of the two previous years. Subsequently an informer reported arms purchases by William Forester, the MP for Much Wenlock, Leveson Gower, Lord Brandon and others, claiming Woodhouse was the most likely to know about any planned uprising. George Plaxton's unhelpful letter followed. The consequence was a series of court appearances and imprisonments. He was served with a capias writ, an arrest warrant sent to the King's Bench ordering detention in cases of excommunication. He successfully appealed against this in November 1683 but in the following year another capias led to his imprisonment at Shrewsbury. After the Monmouth Rebellion against James VII and II began in June 1685, Woodhouse was one a number of dissenting ministers rounded up and imprisoned at Chester Castle.

Woodhouse's circumstances later eased, especially in the reign of William III and Mary II, when the Toleration Act removed legal penalties from Protestant nonconformists. The parish register records the marriage of his daughter, Mary, to a minister named Oliver Cromwell on 3 June 1691 and does not mention the family again. Woodhouse closed the academy in 1697 because of deteriorating health. According to Calamy Revised he then preached at Little St Helen's Church, London as successor to Samuel Annesley, although the same publication places Annesley's preaching post at a meeting house in what became St Helen's Place. Woodhouse died in 1700.

== 18th and 19th centuries ==
=== Clergy, 1690–1867 ===
The clergy who served at Sheriffhales in this period are generally named, with basic details, in Arthur Michell's list in the published parish register. The majority came from Staffordshire gentry backgrounds and most held parishes and other ecclesiastical posts in plurality.

==== Samuel Collier ====
Samuel Collier was presented to vicarage of Sheriffhales on 10 July 1690 by Sir William Leveson Gower. Collier was probably born in 1658, the son of Thomas Collier of Witney. The Collier family were among the most important clothiers in the town, which specialised in the manufacture of blankets. The trade went back to the middle ages and Colliers had been selling blankets in Blackwell Hall, London, since the 1560s. Samuel's father was possibly a Thomas Collier, who died in 1685, and was listed as a gentleman, reflecting the social status and confidence of what was by this time a merchant elite. He was one of the clothiers who issued his own trading tokens.

The sons of wealthy merchants and manufacturers and of the local gentry generally attended the grammar school in Witney, which was founded in 1660 by Henry Box, and aimed to prepare them for university, following a traditional classical curriculum. It was strongly Anglican in ethos and later much criticised for failing to respond to the needs of the numerous nonconformist tradesmen. Collier matriculated as a pleb or non-noble entrant at Trinity College, Oxford on 21 March 1673, aged 15. As he was under 16, he would not have been required to subscribe to the principles of the Church of England at this point. He graduated B.A. in 1676. He subscribed to the 39 Articles with a view to being ordained to the priesthood by John Pritchett, Bishop of Gloucester on 5 December 1677, but there is no evidence the ordination took place. There is then a long gap before Collier appears at Sheriffhales in 1690. For part of it he must have been a student, as an MA from Trinity College, Dublin was noted when he subscribed before his institution at Sheriffhales. This subscription is marked as connected to an ordination, so it may be that Collier had postponed becoming a priest for more than a decade while following some other occupation.

Despite early hesitancy, Collier's patron, Sir William Leveson Gower had welcomed the Glorious Revolution and was elected to the Convention Parliament for Newcastle-under-Lyme as a supporter of William and Mary. He was an active MP on the Whig side and had always sympathised with nonconformists but was himself strongly Anglican. Looking to the future he favoured Princess Anne as a future successor to the throne. When the next parliament convened in February 1690, he entered it as a Tory, although he died the following year.

A Presbyterian survey, conducted around the time of Collier's appointment in 1690, recorded the dissenting ministers who served in Sheriffhales at that time. Woodhouse was still working at his academy in the manor house and it was recorded that he "preached to his pupils and some few neighbours but never was a publick minister." He was assisted by John Doughty, who was possibly the son of Samuel Doughty, the ejected Rector of Sibson, Leicestershire. Another who preached for Woodhouse occasionally was Samuel Beresford, a Shrewsbury man who had been ejected from his living at St Werburgh's, Derby, in 1662 and had since lived at Shifnal and with Sir Thomas Wilbraham at Weston under Lizard.

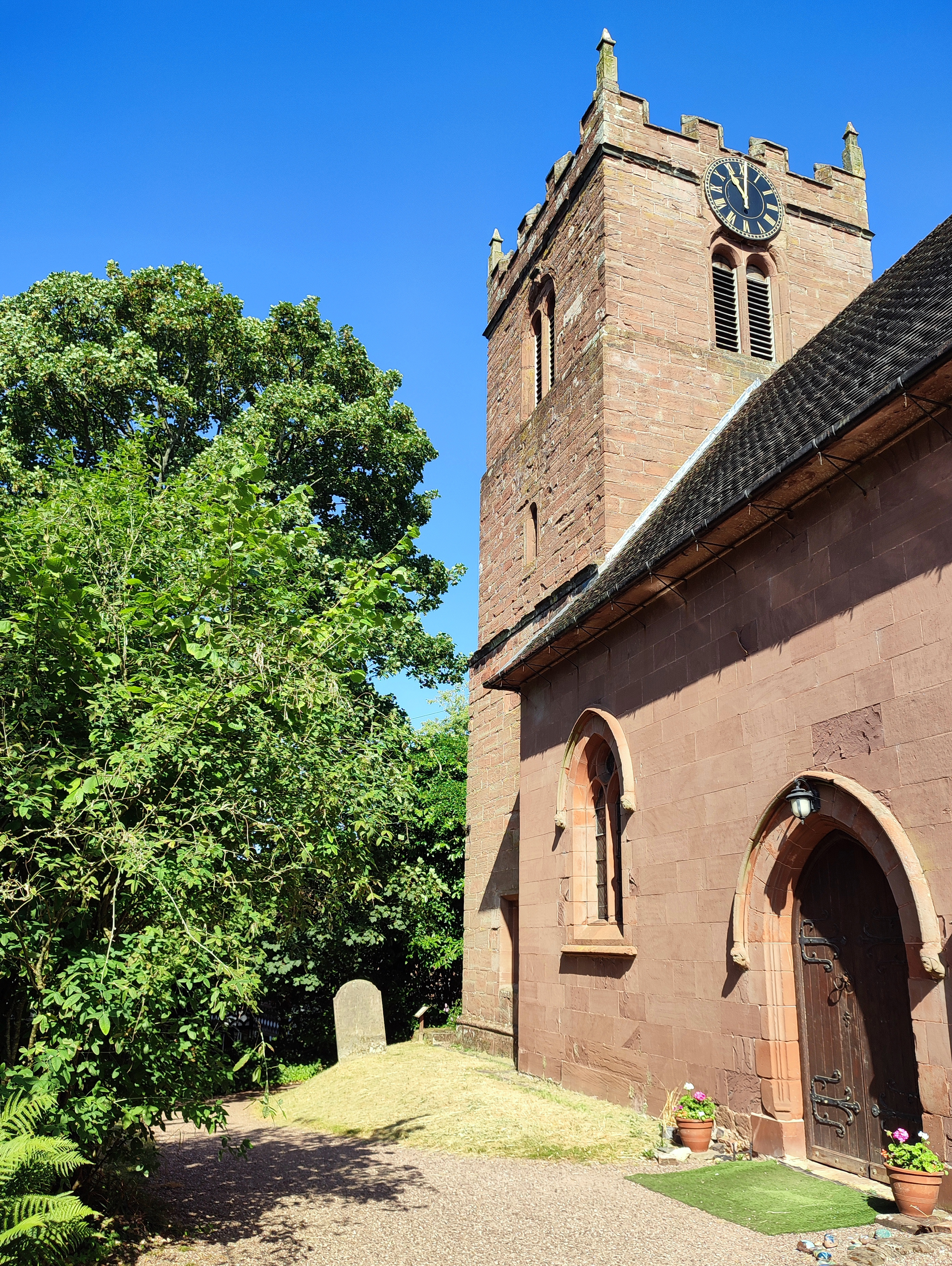
Sheriffhales church bell tower, replacing the original tower which collapsed c.1717.

Samuel Collier was vicar of Sheriffhales for more than thirty years. There are no entries in the register to suggest he ever married or had children: his name appears most years in March, with those of the churchwardens, to validate the previous years' records. From 1701 to 1705 the records are instead independently audited by a John Yapp. This is probably related to the Marriage Duty Act 1694, which sought to raise funds for war with France. Yapp is named as a surveyor, so he would have been responsible for extracting the information required to impose levies on births, marriages and deaths, as well as bachelors over 25 years of age and childless widowers, all of which were chargeable at graduated rates. At some point towards the end of Collier's life, probably in 1717, the church tower collapsed. Samuel Collier was buried, on 24 January 1721, long after the fees were dispensed with as unworkable, but with the fallen tower still in ruins.

==== Thomas Birch ====
Thomas Birch was appointed curate at Sheriffhales on 28 May 1719. He was a Shropshire man, educated at Queens' College, Cambridge, where he matriculated in 1706 and graduated BA in 1710. He was soon after ordained a deacon in London but not priested until three years later, on 20 September 1713, at Eccleshall by the Bishop of Lichfield, John Hough. He was living at Sheriffhales well before he was appointed curate. He married Jane Whittle at St Mary's on 24 June 1715. The baptism of their son first son Samuel was registered at Sheriffhales in June 1718. and another son Thomas was baptised early in 1720. Birch would have been useful to Samuel Collier, who was possibly ailing by this time. Michell's list of curates suggests Birch stayed until 1738, when he was replaced by Samuel Birch, his son.

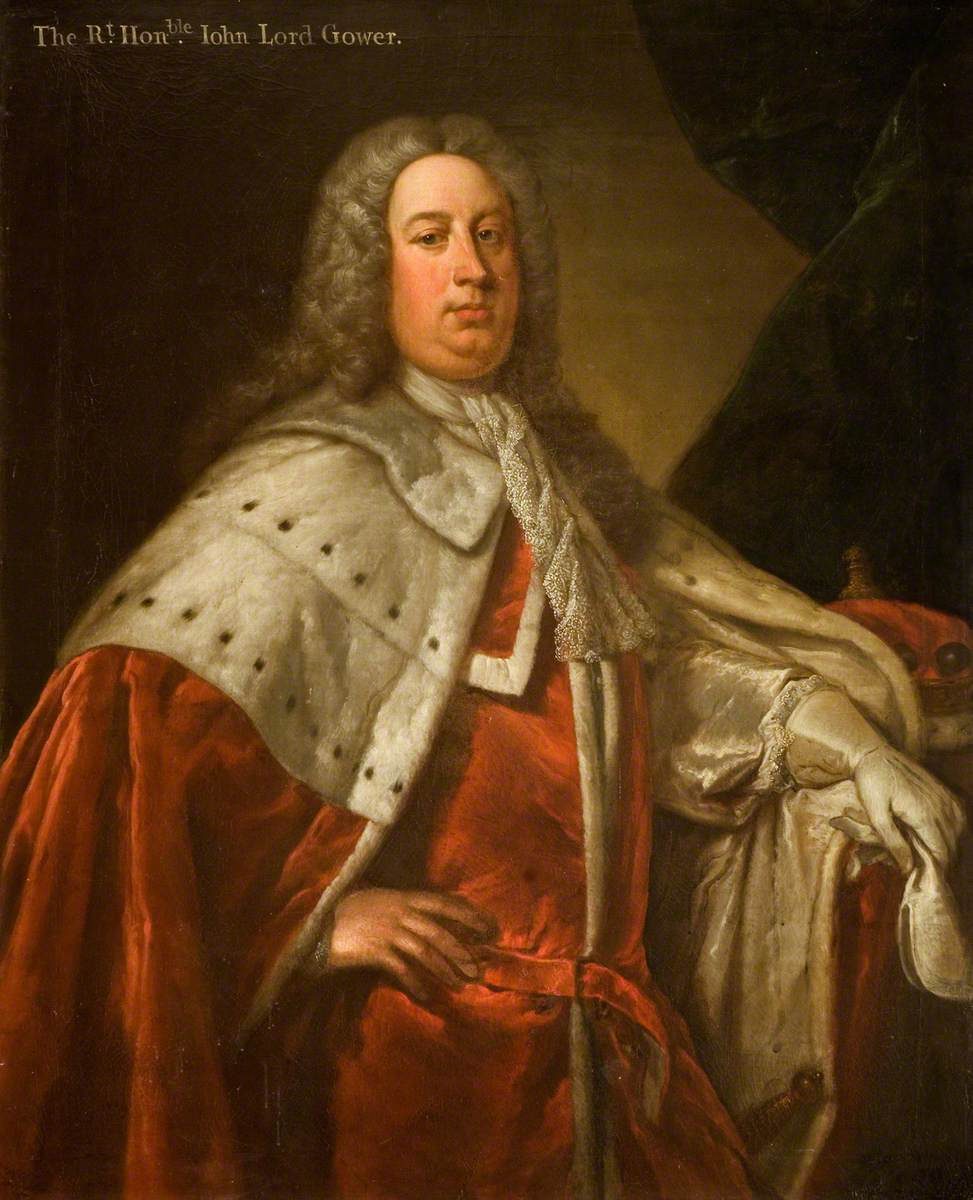
John Leveson-Gower, 2nd Baron Gower From 1746 1st Earl Gower. He presented three successive vicars to St Mary's.

==== Robert Fowler ====
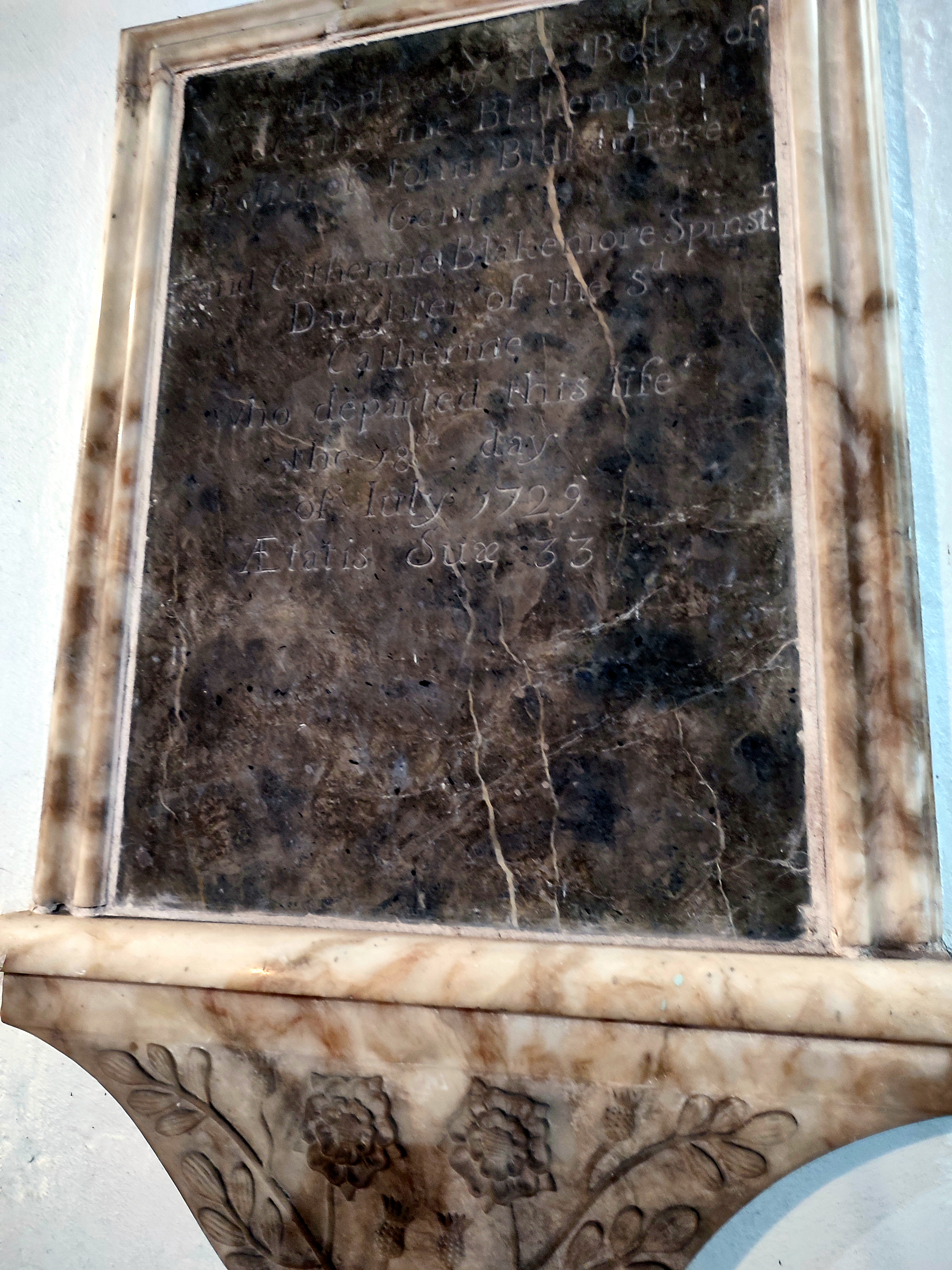
Memorial to Catherine Blakemore of Sheriffhales, died 1729, St Mary's Church, Sheriffhales.

Robert Fowler took the subscription oath on his induction to the vicarage of Sheriffhales on 28 June 1721 He was presented by John Leveson-Gower, 2nd Baron Gower. At this time Leveson-Gower was a leading Tory politician, able to get his candidates elected as MPs for the boroughs of Stafford and Newcastle-under-Lyme and in the county seats of Staffordshire. He did not brook opposition: at Newcastle he leased 60 cottages from the tame corporation at nominal rents and evicted any occupants who did not vote for his candidates.

Robert Fowler was from Staffordshire, the son of Charles Fowler of Pendeford Hall, near Wolverhampton. Although of minor gentry background, Charles had married Sarah Leveson, granddaughter of Colonel Thomas Leveson of Wolverhampton, and through her acquired a considerable range of estates, for example the lordship and lands at Cheslyn Hay. Robert must have been a younger son, as his brother Richard was to inherit the estates. He was baptized at St Michael and All Angels, Tettenhall, on 13 October 1695. He matriculated at Christ Church, Oxford on 1 March 1714 and graduated BA on 17 November 1717, for some reason under the name Thomas. He was ordained deacon at Christ Church Cathedral, Oxford, to which his college was attached, in September 1719 and ordained a priest in London in March 1721.

Fowler signed the parish register for the first time in spring 1723, together with the churchwardens, Thomas Whittle and Andrew Penson, but even before this their initials and those of the curate, Thomas Birch, had been placed on a plaque on the south side of the church, beneath the new tower, probably to celebrate its completion. In 1722 five bells were installed in the tower, financed mainly by Leveson-Gower, the patron. Fowler seems to have built a close relationship with Leveson-Gower, who was a fairly remote kinsman. In 1732 Leveson-Gower made him perpetual curate of Trentham parish church, St Mary and All Saints'. He held Trentham, alongside Sheriffhales and his subsequent post, until his death. Thomas Birch was working at Sheriffhales throughout the period Fowler was vicar, and Fowler must have been absent fairly regularly if he gave Trentham due attention. In July 1738 Fowler accepted the Rectory of Donington, where Leveson-Gower held the advowson, and resigned his vicarage at Sheriffhales, following the example of George Plaxton before him. He became domestic chaplain to Leveson Gower in 1749. He continued to live at Donington, a short distance from Sheriffhales, until his death in September 1770.

==== William Ward ====
William Ward became vicar of Sheriffhales on 1 August 1738. Like Fowler, he was presented by John Leveson-Gower, second Baron Gower. His entire career was determined by his family's status and connections.

Ward's father was also William Ward, of Willingsworth Hall, then in the large parish of Sedgley: today the Willingsworth area is in Gospel Oak, between Wednesbury and Tipton. The older William was an MP for Staffordshire 1710–1713 and 1715–1720. A moderate who voted sometimes with the Whigs and at other times a Tory, he was firm in his support for the House of Hanover.

William Ward went off to Pembroke College, Cambridge at the age of 18 in 1724. and graduated LLB in 1729. In September of that year he was ordained deacon by Edward Chandler, the bishop of Lichfield and on 5 September 1730 Chandler ordained him priest. This was just in time, as Ward had already been instituted Vicar of Sedgley by the bishop two days earlier, presented by John Ward, his own brother. This coincided with the announcement of a vacancy caused by the death of the previous vicar, Richard Ames, who had died after only a year in the post.

While William was at university, his brother John Ward had become in 1727 Tory MP for Newcastle-under-Lyme, a borough completely controlled by John Leveson-Gower, along with Baptist Leveson-Gower, Lord Gower's brother and he remained so until 1734. It was eight years after Ward acquired Sedgley parish that he was presented at Sheriffhales, by Lord Gower, his brother's political patron, and he was vicar for just three years, keeping his Sedgley benefice throughout. He appears to have signed the Sheriffhales parish register only once. The benefice was declared vacant because of Ward's resignation on 25 September 1741. Ward's period of office at Sheriffhales was the shortest known with certainty. By this time he had already taken on the more convenient parish of Kingswinford, where his brother John, who had in 1740 become Baron Ward, was the patron.

Ward hung on to Sedgley parish until 1745, when he gave it up for Himley, again presented by his brother John. He died on 20 July 1758. A note made by Rev Edward Best in the burial register of Bilston described him as "a Gentleman of good learning and also of being of a very sedentary disposition & using little exercise of any kind." He was buried at Himley.

==== Samuel Birch ====
Samuel Birch, the son of the curate Thomas, grew up in Sheriffhales and acquired his education firstly at Adams' Grammar School in Newport. He was admitted as a sizar, probably reflecting a curate's low income, at Sidney Sussex College, Cambridge, in June 1737, matriculated the following year and graduated BA in 1741. About the same time he was ordained deacon. Arthur Michell thought he succeeded his father as curate in 1738. The dating seems unlikely but Samuel certainly returned to Sheriffhales after university, only to die in January 1742. There is no record of his being appointed curate, but his burial record refers to his title of Reverend, to which he was entitled as a deacon.

==== William Fox ====
William Fox was instituted vicar of Sheriffhales on 25 September 1741 by Bishop Richard Smalbroke. He was inducted by the patron, again John Leveson-Gower, and read out his assent and consent to the 39 articles on 5 October. Fox is described in both Thompson Michell's list and Alumni Oxonienses, the list of Oxford University's former students, as the son of a William Fox of Whiston, Staffordshire. Whiston was and still is part of Penkridge parish. Alumni Oxonienses also includes a William Foxe, son of George Foxe of Whiston, who became Vicar of Wombourne in 1696. The younger William Fox is likely have been born at Wombourne as his birth year works out as 1697 or 1698. He was admitted to Pembroke College, Oxford in 1712 at the age of 14 and graduated BA in 1715 and MA in 1718. He was ordained deacon in May 1719 by Edward Chandler but did not become a priest until September 1721. His father died at Wombourne in 1725. The clergy database suggests that William might have been a curate at Kingswinford from 1732

There is a considerable gap in Fox's career before his arrival at Sheriffhales. Once inducted, however, he was committed to the parish for the rest of his life. There is no record of his holding any other parishes. At various points in his ministry he was assisted by curates. From 1747 to 1750 John Power appears as a curate in the parish register. By August 1777 Fox was being assisted by Thomas Spencer, who conducted most of the marriage services between then and Fox's death. A separate marriage register had commenced in 1754 and it recorded the officiant on every occasion. Fox presided almost consistently until his last two years. He was buried at Sheriffhales on 17 July 1779 aged 83.

==== John Power ====
John Power was a curate at Sheriffhales during the 1740s. He was born about 1723 in Cheadle, Staffordshire and schooled at Chebsey, near Eccleshall. Aged 16, he was admitted as a sizar at Trinity College, Cambridge, and graduated BA in 1743. He was ordained deacon by Richard Smalbroke at Ettingshall in September 1745 and priested almost exactly a year later in the same place, having served as curate at Blymhill. He appears in Sheriffhales parish register, signing it as curate, in place of the vicar, William Fox, in 1747. In January 1750 he signs an amendment making clear that the father of a baptizand was not a parish resident. After serving at Sheriffhales for about three years, nothing more is known of him.

==== Thomas Spencer ====
Thomas Spencer was a curate at Sheriffhales under the vicars William Fox and Sambrooke Higgins. A Thomas Spencer who entered Magdalene College, Cambridge as a sizar, aged 19, in 1771 had been educated at Shrewsbury School, although his origins were traceable over the Welsh border to Guilsfield in Montgomeryshire, now part of Powys. He graduated BA in 1775 and his university record notes his ordination as a deacon at Peterborough on 18 December 1774. However, although he was ordained by John Hinchliffe, the bishop of Peterborough, the event took place in Cambridge at Trinity College Chapel. He was ordained a priest at St George's, Bloomsbury in September 1776 in connection with his licensing as a stipendiary curate at Lilleshall. His first appearance in Sheriffhales came on 10 August 1777, when he conducted a marriage between Frances Bray, a local woman, and Thomas Walford from Wiltshire. Thereafter he appears regularly in the parish records until mid-1785.

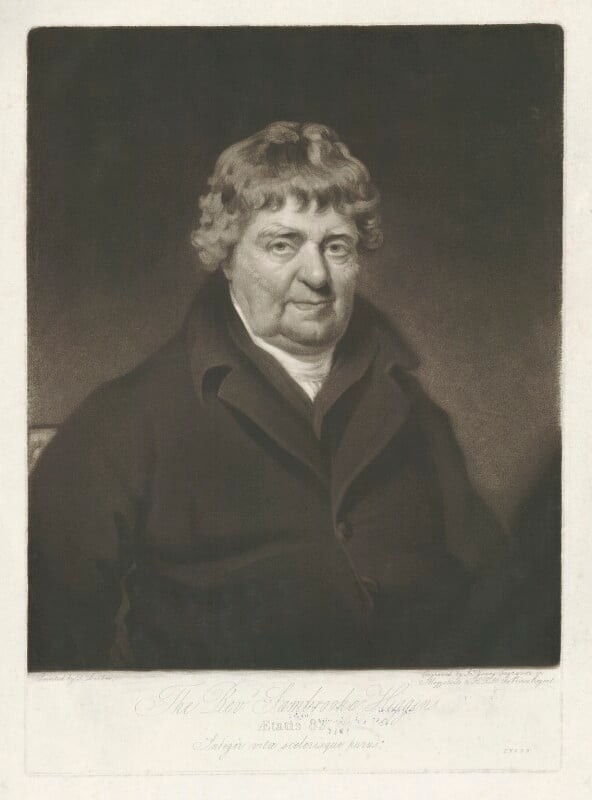
Sambrooke Higgins, English clergyman and estate manager, c.1734-1823. By John Young, after Thomas Barber mezzotint, 1813-1825 NPG D35764. © National Portrait Gallery, London

==== Sambrooke Higgins ====
When Sambrooke Higgins was instituted vicar of Sheriffhales by Bishop Richard Hurd on 14 September I779, he had already been Rector of Norbury for almost twenty years. His entry in Alumni Oxonienses does not mention Sheriffhales, but nor does it mention his many other offices: just Norbury. So it barely hints at the breadth and wealth of his career as an ecclesiastical businessman.

Sambrooke Higgins was the son of Christopher Higgins of Loynton, where the family had built Loynton Hall around 1671, although they had held the estate since 1649. Christopher's father was also called Christopher and his mother was Rachel Sambrooke, whose surname came from the village of Sambrook, Shropshire, close to Norbury and Loynton. It was thereafter regularly used as a forename in the family. The younger Christopher was presumably a lawyer, since he belonged to Barnard's Inn, one of the now defunct Inns of Chancery, attached to Gray's Inn. His wife, and Sambrooke's mother, was Mary Blower, co-heiress of Norfolk landowner and lawyer Richard Blower. Her fortune probably enabled Christopher to pay off considerable debts and give their children a secure financial foundation. Sambrooke had an older brother, Richard, who inherited the estate but who predeceased him in 1780, leaving him a very wealthy landowner, as well as three sisters, Catherine, Rachel and Dorothy.

Sambrooke Higgins had an Oxford education, matriculating at Brasenose College on 19 March 1752, at the age of 18. He went on to BA in 1755 and MA in 1758. Meanwhile he was ordained deacon by Bishop Fredrick Cornwallis in Holy Trinity Church, Eccleshall in September 1757 Higgins had clearly decided to stay on home territory in his ecclesiastical career, as his first appointment, following immediately on ordination, was as curate at Chetwynd, Shropshire, a parish that includes Sambrook. Almost exactly a year later he was priested, also by Cornwallis at Eccleshall. Higgins would have assisted the Rector of Chetwynd, William Bill Saunders, a former Head Master of Nottingham grammar school who was now aged.

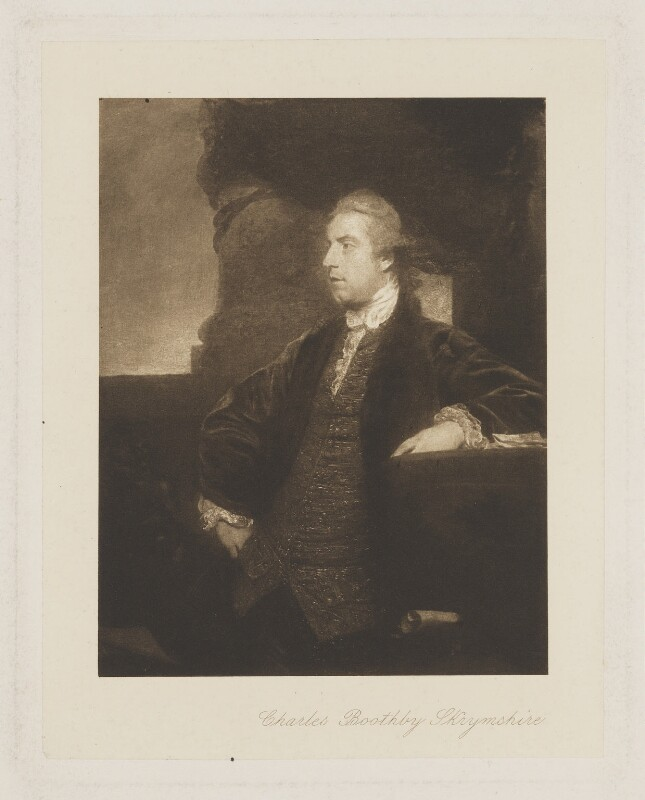
Charles Boothby Skrymshire, Staffordshire landowner,patron of Sambrooke Higgins at Norbury. After Sir Joshua Reynolds mezzotint, (1766-1767) NPG D41723 © National Portrait Gallery, London

After a further year at Chetwynd, Higgins moved on to the rectory of Norbury, to which he was instituted on 31 July 1759. The advowson was in the hands of Charles Boothby Skrymsher, the son of Thomas Boothby, a Leicestershire landowner and Elizabeth Skrymsher of Norbury, coheiress of Sir Charles Skrymsher, the lord of the manor of Norbury. The Skrymshers were related to Sir Robert Walpole the Whig Prime Minister and Thomas Boothby Skrymsher, as he became after his marriage, fought two elections for the Whigs at Leicester, one successfully, although he was an MP for only a few months in 1727. His son Charles inherited his estates and advowsons when he died in 1751 and it was he who presented Sambrooke Higgins as rector. They were part of the same very local gentry circle.

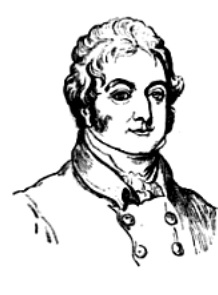
Thomas Anson, 1st Viscount Anson, a major Staffordshire landowner for whom Sambrooke Higgins worked as steward of the Shugborough estate.

Later the manor and the patronage of the church at Norbury were bought by George Adams of Sambrook, who then acquired through marriage the estates of the Ansons of Shugborough Hall: he changed his name to Anson in 1773. George was a Whig MP for Lichfield and became a strong opponent of Britain's involvement in the American Revolutionary War. Higgins became his steward of the Anson estates and continued to manage them after George's death, until 1818. George Anson successor, his son Thomas took over the estates and his father's political work in 1789. The scope of the task undertaken Higgins is indicated by Thomas's huge income of £16,000 a year. Higgins was clearly very active in estate management, although it seems his methods were not seen as entirely professional by younger generations. No secular responsibilities could dislodge Higgins from the rectory of Norbury: he held the position until his death in 1823 – a period of nearly 64 years.

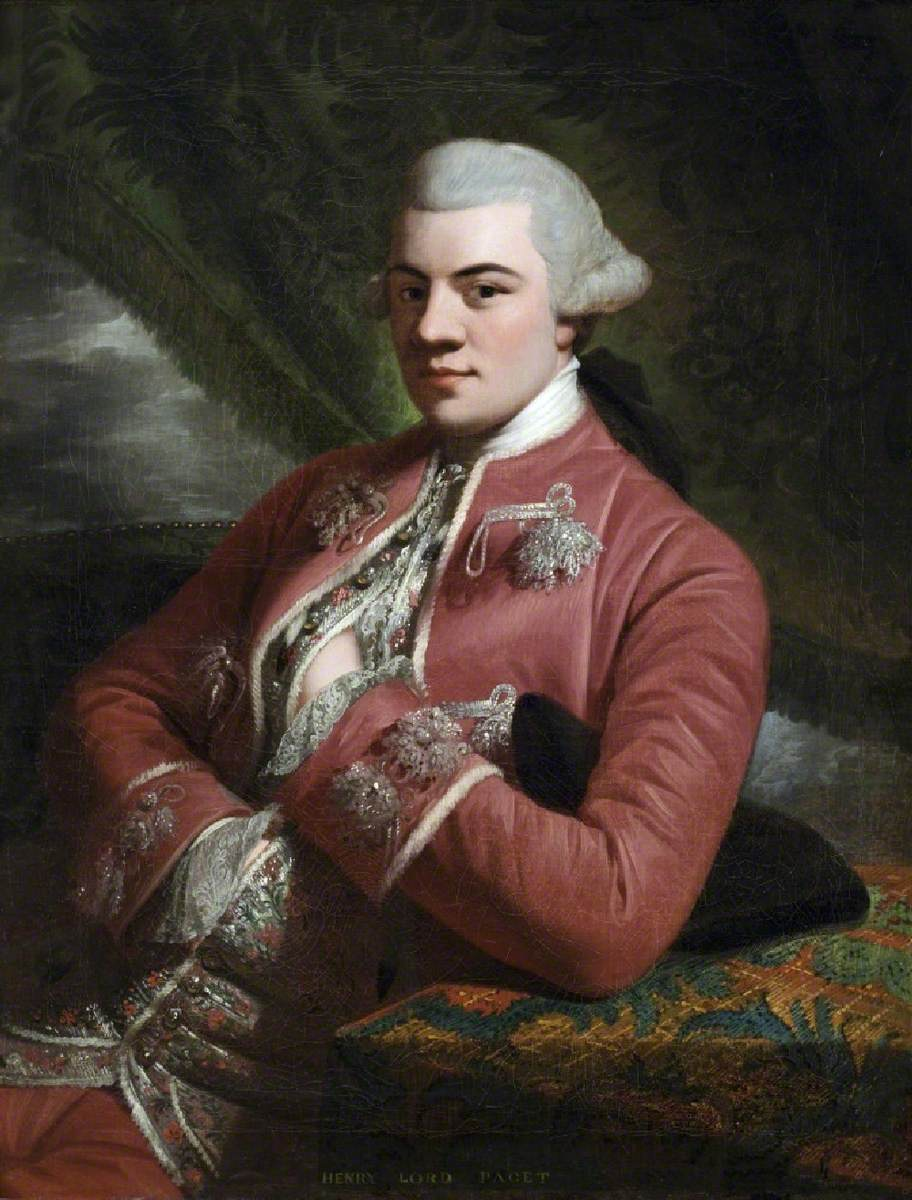
Sir Henry Bayley, later Baron Paget and Earl of Uxbridge, for whom Sambrooke Higgins was domestic chaplain. Attributed to Giuseppe Filippo Liberati Marchi.

In 1772 Higgins became domestic chaplain to Henry, Lord Paget of Beaudesert. Paget had been Henry Bayley of Plas Newydd but was related through his mother to the Paget family, who had long held large estates around Cannock Chase. A succession problem led him to inherit these estates in 1769 and he changed his name to Paget to accommodate the new situation. The appointment had to be approved by Frederick Cornwallis, who was now Archbishop of Canterbury.

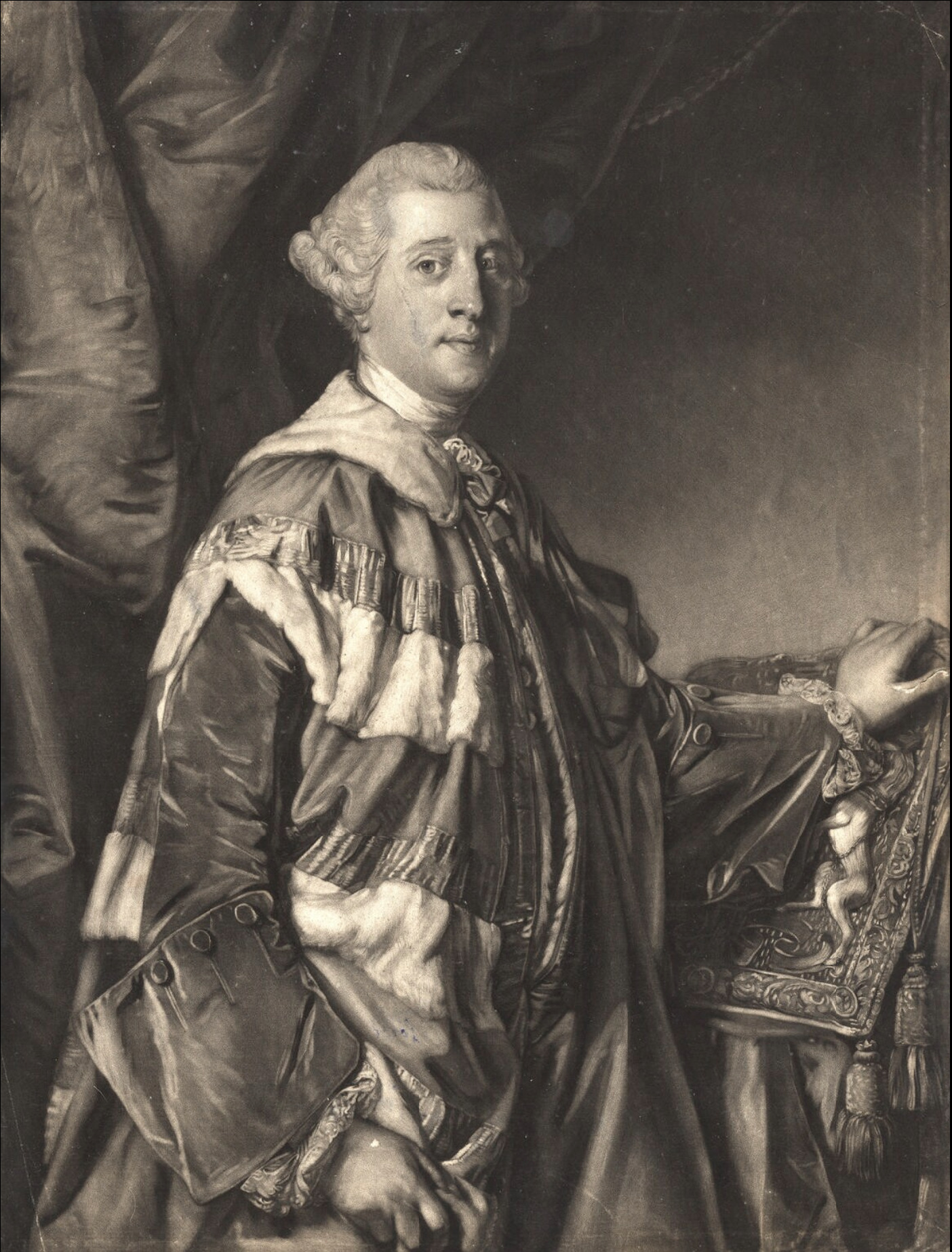
Granville Leveson-Gower, 1st Marquess of Stafford, patron of Sheriffhales church at the induction of Sambrooke Higgins

Higgins now held two posts with cure of souls, so he could not be instituted vicar of Sheriffhales in 1779 without special dispensation from the Archbishop. This was granted on 8 September, with a note that the living was valued at about £90. He was presented by Granville Leveson-Gower, 2nd Earl Gower, who was at the peak of his political career. Although a Whig of the conservative Bloomsbury Gang, he held the post of Lord President of the Council in the mainly Tory ministry of Frederick North, Lord North during the American Revolutionary War. Higgins signed the parish register at the end of the year and continued to do so for the next four years, always with the curate, Thomas Spencer, and the churchwardens. Some volumes of the register also contain a note explaining that they were used as evidence in a case brought by Sambrooke Higgins against John Cotes and others before the four judges of the Court of Exchequer Chamber in 1786. This was the latest instalment in the centuries-long argument over the precise status of Woodcote chapel.

Otherwise, Higgins is notable by his absence from the records. The separate marriage register begun under William Fox, which records the officiant in each case, never mentions Higgins. Instead it features only the curates, Thomas Spencer until the middle of 1785, John Heptinstall until early 1788, then Robert Dean until the book was finished in 1795. A new register book was then opened and Dean continued conducting weddings until it finished at the end of 1812. It is possible that curates presided at most, if not all, services in the parish while Higgins was vicar.

It is unclear how long Higgins worked as chaplain to Lord Paget but a licence was issued to George Champagne to act as chaplain to Paget in 1784, so it is likely that Higgins had retired from the position at that point. It was in 1784 that John Wesley made his first visit to Sheriffhales, delivering a brief sermon on his way from a visit to John William Fletcher of Madeley to Stafford. On 28 March 1786 he called again on his way to Stafford, remarking in his journal: ″After calling at Sheriffhales, and giving them a short exhortation, I hastened to Stafford, and found the congregation waiting...″ ″Them″ suggests a group of sympathisers already waiting for him in Sheriffhales, as at Stafford.

Higgins took on at least two further ecclesiastical offices, although neither involved pastoral care. In January 1789 he was appointed Prebendary of Gaia Major and canon residentiary of Lichfield Cathedral by Bishop James Cornwallis, the former Bishop Frederick's nephew. The prebend of Gaia Major was just north of the cathedral, around Gaia Lane, and consisted of 272½ acres of land. The prebends dated from the middle ages and their original purpose had been to provide an income for working members of the cathedral chapter. By this time they were often treated as tradeable assets. The income will have varied from year to year, but when the great tithes were commuted in the 1840s the Ecclesiastical Commissioners were awarded £62 8s. The residentiaries, as the name suggests, were supposed to be administrative staff actually living in the cathedral, but their lodgings had long ago been rented out. This part of the system was regulated by an Act of 1706 that had proved unworkable, so a thorough reorganisation was carried out under the Dean and Chapter of Lichfield Cathedral Act, introduced in 1796 and approved in 1797. Six new posts were created, each supported by two of the prebends. Higgins lost his residentiaryship at this point and his name does not appear in lists of residentiaries after the Act. However, he retained the prebend until his death, on 23 July 1823.

As Sambrooke Higgins was without issue, the Higgins family lands passed to great nephew, Thomas Higgins Burne, of the Woodlands, Penn, near Wolverhampton.

==== Robert Dean ====
Robert Dean was a curate who served Sheriffhales thorough most of the period in which Sambrooke Higgins was vicar and for a considerable time afterwards. The published sources do not shed much light on his background. He does not figure in the databases of the university students and few appointment documents do not mention an academic qualification. He is twice mentioned in the Tong parish register, conducting weddings 1778 and 1781. before his first appearance at Sheriffhales. Although he is described as "Curate," the context makes clear that the actual curate of Tong at that time was Charles Buckeridge. He first appears in the Sheriffhales register in 1787, conducting the wedding of a local couple, Thomas Tooth and Sarah Rudge. His name then appears consistently in the Sheriffhales marriage register until 21 December 1812. Late in this period he also conducted weddings at Tong in 1809 and 1812. This was already a long spell of duty for a curate, but Dean's first appointment record for Sheriffhalesdoes not appear until 1811. In this he is appointed Stipendiary Curate for £52 10s. Plus surplice fees. In 1817 the Clerical Guide listed Dean, not Higgins, as the incumbent and vicar at Sheriffhales. It is hard to be sure how the mistake occurred. On 2 December 1823 Dean's home at Sheriffhales was burgled by a gang active in the Newport area and an iron chest, containing St Mary's communion silverware, was taken away. It seems that it was later recovered and the perpetrators apprehended. In 1824 Dean was again licensed as assistant curate at Sheriffhales and Woodcote on a stipend of £100. 'Two mentions in the Liber Cleri on 9 June 1830 note that he was licensed to work in Woodcote chapel, which was a chapel of ease, but also the domestic chapel of the Cotes family. Dean served Sheriffhales for much longer than any other clergyman: a total of 51 years or more.

==== William Hamilton Molineux ====
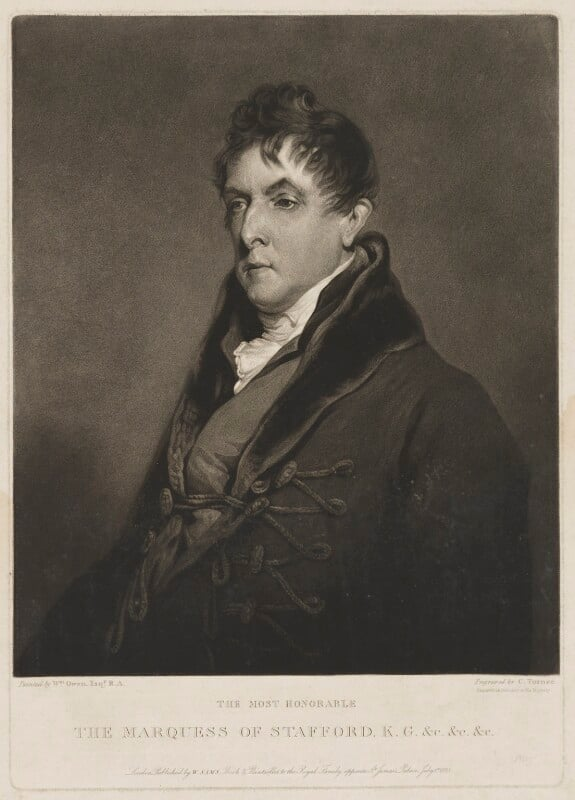
George Granville Leveson-Gower, Marquess of Stafford, later 1st Duke of Sutherland, patron of St Mary's, by Charles Turner, published by William Sams, after William Owen. Mezzotint, published 1 July 1825. NPG D41844. © National Portrait Gallery, London

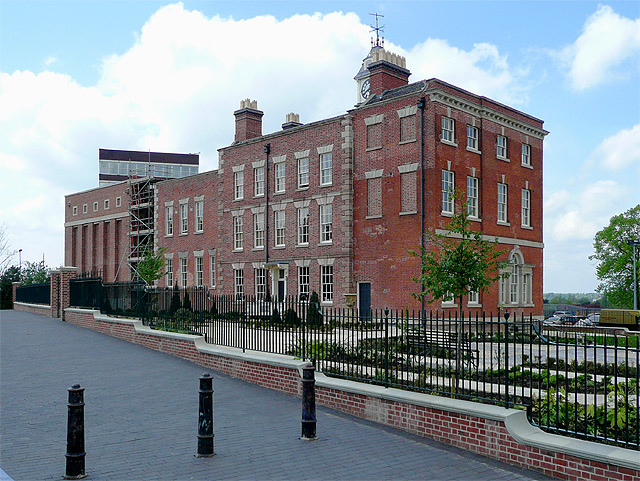
The former Molineux Hotel and Molineux House, William Hamilton Molineux's family home, photographed after its 2009 restoration.

Molineux was instituted Vicar of Sheriffhales on 11 November 1823 by Bishop James Cornwallis. The patron at this time was George Granville Leveson-Gower, Marquess of Stafford. Leveson-Gower would have been immensely rich even if he had not married Elizabeth, 19th Countess of Sutherland. His wife's instigation of a large part of the Highland Clearances had brought both of them notoriety. His presentation of William Hamilton Molineux can hardly have been controversial, as he was a Cambridge graduate of the usual landed gentry background with a fairly undistinguished career already behind him.

William Hamilton Molineux was the son of George Molineux and Jane Robinson, born on 18 April 1781 and baptised at St Peter's Collegiate Church on 10 August, his name mangled to Hamblington. George Molineux was a banker and ironmonger, as well as a landowner, the owner of Molineux House on the northern edge of Wolverhampton. Today this is the Wolverhampton City Archives, while part of its surrounding park has become the Wolverhampton Wanderers football stadium. He and Ann had six sons but only one, George Fieldhouse Molineux, almost seven years older than William, and also a cleric, was to have children. William also had three sisters. He was admitted to Clare College, Cambridge shortly after his 18th birthday, on 5 May 1799. He proceeded to BA in 1803, and MA in 1807. Meanwhile he had embarked on his clerical career, ordained deacon at Eccleshall in June 1805. He was already licensed for a curacy at Tong, with a stipend of £40. However he seems to have taken up the position only on the day he was ordained a priest, in January 1806. Instead, within days of becoming a deacon, he accepted the position of Perpetual Curate of Acton Trussell. The patron was George Molineux, presumably William's own father. William kept the perpetual curacy for the remainder of his life but by 1811 he had acquired the patronage and nominated a curate, William Blow Collis, on a stipend of £75. His deputy did the work for him. Shortly after, Molineux at last took up a curacy at Tong, on a stipend of £40. Later that same year he was licensed also to be a curate at Christleton in Cheshire. He seems to have kept this curacy until 1823, shortly before he became vicar of Sheriffhales. The known career of Robert Dean suggests that it was actually he who actually undertook the liturgical and pastoral work at Sheriffhales. This allowed Molineux to continue his opportunistic juggling of curacies. He was licensed in 1825 as stipendiary curate of St Olave's Church, Chester, on £45 a year. St Olave's had struggled to maintain a congregation for a very long time and did not long survive Molineux. Unlike his predecessor, Molineux was at least acknowledged as Vicar of Sheriffhales in the 1829 edition of the Clerical Guide. He died at Ryton, Shropshire, on 27 September 1831, aged 50, after just less than eight years as vicar of Sheriffhales.

==== John Hinckley ====
The Marquess of Stafford next presented another fairly safe member of the Staffordshire gentry, John Hinkley, who was instituted Vicar of Sheriffhales on 9 January 1832 by Bishop Henry Ryder, a prominent Evangelical. John Hinckley was born 13 April 1796, son of Thomas Hinckley of Lichfield, a prosperous lawyer, credited as an armiger, bearer of a coat of arms. Thomas and his brothers, Arthur and Richard were heirs to a legal dynasrty and had a practice based in Market Street, just south of the Cathedral. Thomas was steward of the Longdon estate and he had prospered sufficiently by 1827 to buy Beacon Place, west of the Cathedral close, which he shared with his brother Richard.

John Hinckley was admitted at the age of 19 to Christ Church, Oxford, matriculating on 4 May 1815. He graduated BA in 1819 from St Mary's Hall, Oxford, then a separate college but now integrated into Oriel College. However, he did not receive his MA until 1828. Meanwhile he had proceeded to ordination as a deacon in September 1819 at the Grosvenor Chapel, intending to take up a post as curate at Farewell a few miles north-west of Lichfield. He was ordained priest at St James's Church, Piccadilly in October 1820. In December he was licensed as stipendiary curate of Wychnor, north-east of Lichfield, although it was stipulated that he would live in Lichfield itself. An entry in the Liber Cleri (Book of the Clergy) in July 1829 remarks that he was still curate at Wychnor, living in Lichfield, and on a stipend of £40 per annum. It is likely that Hinckley was residing comfortably at Beacon Place, which his father had recently purchased. His next position was no further away from Lichfield: Kings Bromley, where he was nominated Perpetual Curate in March 1829. The patron was Hugh Bailye, who was Chancellor of Lichfield Cathedral and held the church as part of his prebend of Alrewas. Only a year later Bailye inducted him also as Vicar of All Saints Church, Alrewas. Hinckley resigned this vicarage in 1832, six months after taking up Sheriffhales. died 9 October 1867.

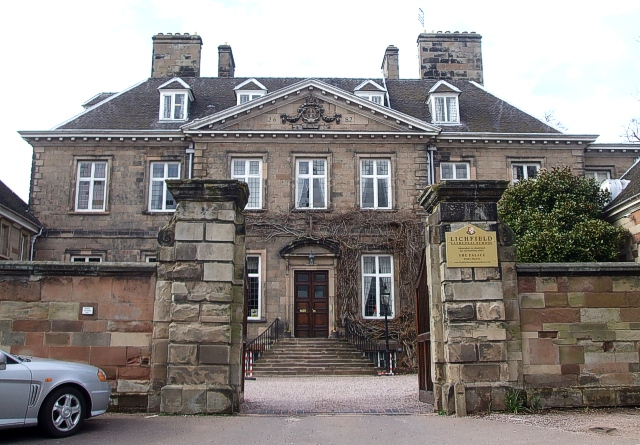
Lichfield Cathedral School – the former Bishop's Palace, John Hickley's home for almost three decades.

John Hinckley was listed as vicar of Sheriffhales in the 1836 edition of the Clerical Guide, when the parish was reckoned to have a population of 916, with room for 300 in the church. At this time his father, Thomas Hinckley, was confined because of mental illness, and he died in 1837. His father's will handed over the Beacon estate entirely to his uncle Richard. Richard had recently married Ellen-Jane Robinson, daughter of Dean John Chappel Woodhouse and mother of The Sleeping Children, and she turned the renamed Beacon House into the local showcase for Victorian taste and elegance. John would have received a regular income from his father's estate and now decided to set up home independently: from 1838 he rented the Bishop's Palace at the north-east end of the Cathedral Close in Lichfield. The palace had been rebuilt after the Civil Wars but the bishops had preferred to live at Eccleshall Castle, away from the cathedral chapter. It seems that the palace was Hinckley's main residence until he died in 1867, when the bishops returned to live there. The building is now part of Lichfield Cathedral School.

Although not entirely an absentee incumbent, Hinckley seems to have remained very involved in family and cultural life in Lichfield and continued to hold two widely-separated benefices in plurality. During his incumbency, the Pluralities Acts of 1838 and 1850 made this position untenable, ensuring future vicars would have to live in or very near the parish. Hinckley adopted the compromise of maintaining a residence close to Sheriffhales, at Hilton Bank, which was not actually in the parish, but in an extra-parochial area. The census of 1841 captured his living arrangements there, where he had with him his servants. Ten years later the census reported similar domestic arrangements and revealed that the servants had apparently been collected from the Staffordshire parishes Hinckley had served. He seems to have taken them with him as he moved between his houses. His activities seem to have been little remarked at the time: the only real exception was his prominent part in celebrations for the coming of age of the then Marquess of Stafford in 1849, when he was seen actively serving St Mary's parishioners.

At the 1861 census Hinckley was in Lichfield, living with an assortment of servants and family members, including his solicitor nephew Frederick. The census records confirm that he remained unmarried. The 1860 edition of Crockford's Clerical Directory, which was to become the standard reference work on the clergy, reckoned that Hinckley was drawing about £700 (equivalent to £75,206 in 2025) a year from the vicarage of Sheriffhales, although George Sutherland-Leveson-Gower, 2nd Duke of Sutherland was drawing £800 7s. 6d. (equivalent to £900 in 2025)from the rectorial tithes. Both were now commuted to a fixed annual payment. Hinckley was still also vicar in the parish of King's Bromley, which was worth £224 (equivalent to £23,549 in 2025). He inherited Robert Dean as curate and throughout his long incumbency at Sheriffhales seems to have paid a curate, or even two, to care for the parishioners. Arthur Michell gives a full list of them.

- Edward Meredith, MA, 1833–36
- R A Scott, 1836–39
- William Jeudwine, MA, 1839
- Charles John Maddison, 1842
- Francis Ossian Durant, BA, 1842–48
- Henry Wall Tibbs, MA, 1848–49
- John Edwards, 1853–59
- Richard Henry Howard, MA, 1853
- Edward Stephen Williams, MA, 1855
- Charles Sydney Guille, MA, 1857
- Arthur Henry Webb, 1857–64
- Charles Randal Bradburne, MA, 1864–69
- William Leigh Williamson Evre, 1865–69

John Hinkley died on 9 October 1867 at his home, the Palace in Lichfield.

== Modern period, 1867−1964 ==
=== Evangelical clergy ===
Two vicars of distinctly evangelical outlook had a major impact on St Mary's Church in the Victorian period. They brought a strong concern with religious experience and ethical lifestyle, particularly Temperance.

==== Henry Thomas O'Rorke ====
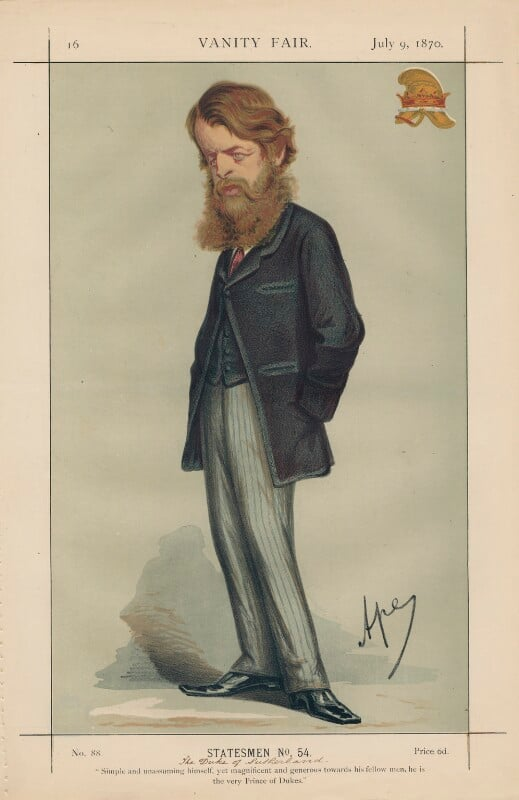
George Granville William Sutherland-Leveson-Gower, 3rd Duke of Sutherland

Henry Thomas O'Rorke became Vicar of Sheriffhales at the very end of 1867, presented by George Sutherland-Leveson-Gower, 3rd Duke of Sutherland, formerly a Liberal member of Parliament. Although immensely rich, Sutherland was very much in tune with an age dedicated to reform. This was embodied in his reception of Giuseppe Garibaldi, the Italian republican and socialist, in 1867 and his attendance of the opening of the Suez Canal two years later. O'Rorke was to prove an attentive incumbent, resident in the parish and active in local affairs.

Henry O'Rorke was born in Moylough, County Galway, in 1833. He was the son of John O'Rorke, who was curate of Moylough and a large, litigious landowner, with 1600 acres in County Roscommon and 217 in County Westmeath. In the 1840s he became the rector of Foxford in County Mayo. His third wife, and Henry's mother, was Elizabeth Dennis. As a youth Henry hunted with the Galway Blazers, the local hunt, which was led by his uncle, John Dennis. For several years he wintered abroad with his ailing eldest sister, visiting Madeira, Austria and Italy, including Rome. This wealthy lifestyle of the Protestant Ascendancy, the socio-political and religious order of Ireland under British rule, was followed through the Great Famine of 1845–1849, which coincided with O'Rorke's teenage years. His university education was at Trinity College, Dublin, a pillar of the Ascendancy, where he graduated BA in 1854 and MA in 1859.

According to Crockford's, Henry O'Rorke was ordained deacon in 1857 and served two years as curate at Burton upon Trent. His wife, Lucy, recollected that he was ordained by the Bishop of Lichfield on Trinity Sunday in 1855 but neither this nor her dating of his university career fits with the account in Crockford's, which was based on postal returns from the clerics themselves. Apparently, Henry had not been intended for the Church and his older brother, Charles Dennis O'Rorke, had taken over their father's ecclesiastical offices as well as his landed estates on his death in 1849. Lucy attributed Henry's ordination to a conversion experience, a direct experience of the Holy Spirit which came in the early hours while he was out shooting wildfowl, accompanied by an acute sense of wasted time. Conversionism was a pillar of the evangelical identity, one of the features enumerated in what has become known as the Bebbington Quadrilateral. Bebbington quotes Lucy O'Rorke's grandfather, William Marsh, who defined an evangelical as one who "believes in the fall and its consequences, in the recovery and its fruits, in the personal application of the recovery by the power of the Spirit of God."

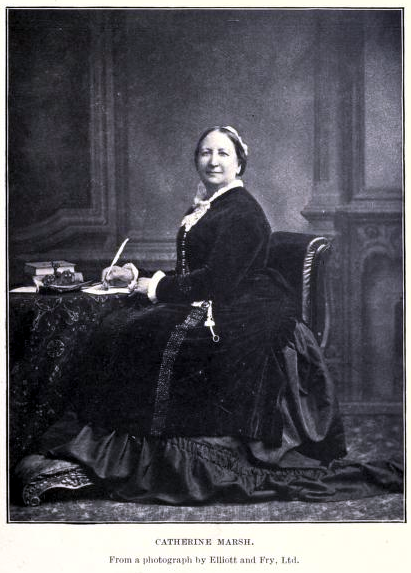
Catherine Marsh (1818–1912), English evangelical writer, philanthropist and activist.

In 1859 O'Rorke was awarded an Oxford University MA by virtue of his Trinity degree and ordained a priest by the bishop of Lichfield, John Lonsdale. The Crockford's entry traces a series of posts, a curacy at Basildon in 1859, probably at Holy Cross Church; another at All Saints Church, Maidstone, 1859–1860; a curacy at Beddington, Surrey, 1860. Finally it lists a post as assistant minister at St Mary the Virgin, Brighton. This career brought him into close contact with the Marsh family. William Marsh, an important priest and preacher, had worked in Basildon, where his father was the patron, and later in Birmingham, where his fiercely eschatological sermons won him the nickname Millennial Marsh, and where he was made principal official and commissary of the royal peculiar of the deanery of Bridgnorth. He lived for a time at Beckenham, with his daughter Matilda Chalmers, whose husband was the rector. He finally accepted the rectory at Beddington in 1860, and died there in 1864. O'Rorke was probably Marsh's appointee to the curacy at Basildon and he was certainly his curate in his last years at Beddington. It was a there that O'Rorke met Marsh's daughter, Catherine Marsh, an evangelical author and philanthropist, who cared for her father in his last years and was to be his biographer.

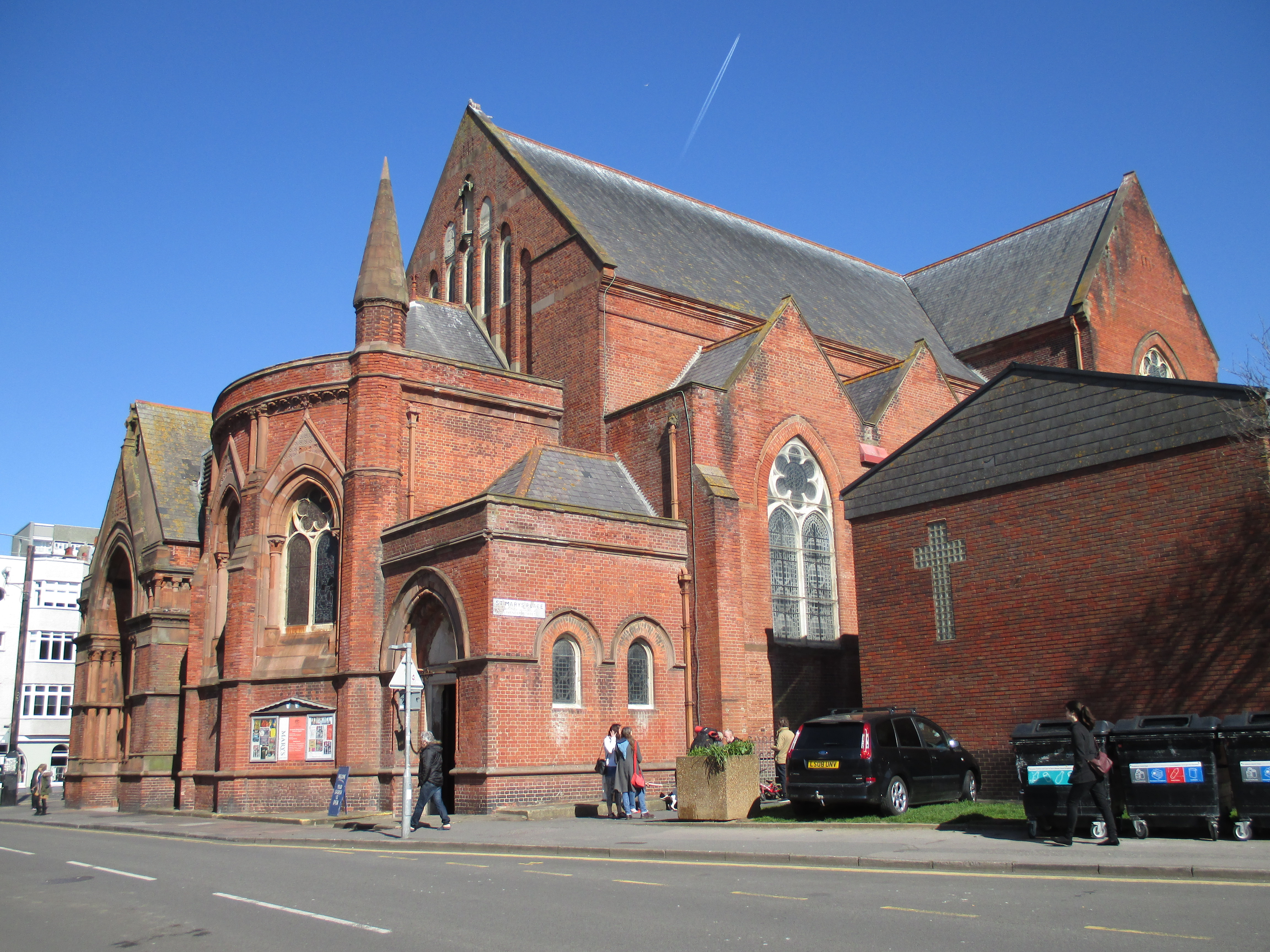
Church of St Mary the Virgin, Kemptown, Brighton

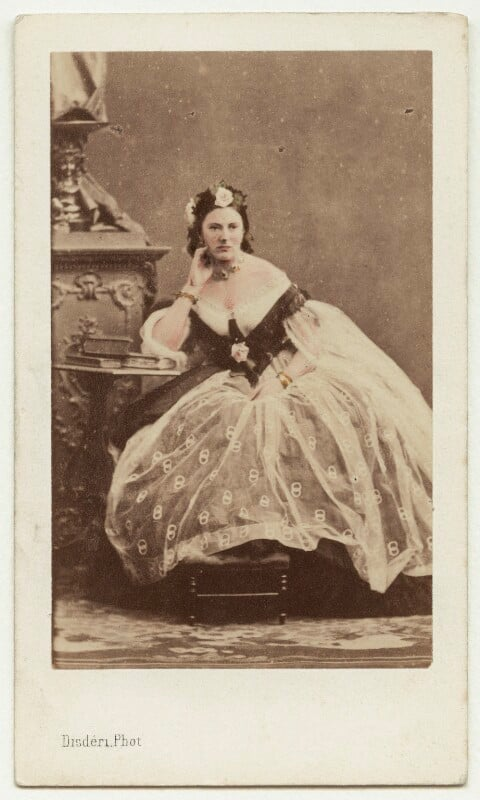
Anne Sutherland Leveson Gower, Duchess of Sutherland, a Liberal society hostess and courtier who was a friend of Catherine Marsh. André-Adolphe-Eugène Disdéri, hand-coloured albumen carte-de-visite, early 1860s, NPG x45346, © National Portrait Gallery, London.

A gathering to celebrate Charles Marsh's 89th birthday in the summer of 1864, close to the end of his life, would have allowed O'Rorke to meet members of the political and religious establishment, whose friendship Catherine Marsh cultivated. These included Henry Venn of the Church Missionary Society a noted anti-slavery campaigner; Samuel Ajayi Crowther; once an enslaved person himself and now the newly consecrated first Black bishop of the Church of England ; Charles Longley, the Archbishop of Canterbury, who had just ordained Crowther, Anne Sutherland-Leveson-Gower, Duchess of Sutherland; a Liberal hostess and courtier; Richard Bourke, 6th Earl of Mayo, formerly Conservative Chief Secretary for Ireland and to be so again; Colin Mackenzie an important officer and diplomat in South Asia, bringing two Afghan attendants who immediately became the target of evangelisation.

After William Marsh's death, O'Rorke travelled for a few months in Italy and returned to marry Lucy Elizabeth Marshall, William's granddaughter and Catherine's niece, at Beckenham, Kent, on 20 April 1865. Lucy was the daughter of Reverend William Knox Marshall and Louisa Marsh. She was named after her godmother, Lady Lucy Whitmore, daughter of the Earl of Bradford and wife of William Wolryche-Whitmore, formerly a radical Whig MP for Bridgnorth and Wolverhampton: these were at that time Catherine Marsh's key contacts in Shropshire and Staffordshire. Lucy had an older sister, Louisa Maria, who was married to the Liberal MP Sir Robert Anstruther and another, Matilda, married to Rev Frederick Chalmers, the Rector of Beckenham, who conducted the wedding. Catherine Marsh was in close contact with Henry Venn Elliott, the ailing minister at St Mary's Brighton, which was still technically a private chapel of the Elliott family but had become a fashionable evangelical church. He requested O'Rorke's help during the transitional period in which his son, Julius, would take over.

The O'Rorkes and Catherine Marsh moved to Brighton, where they arranged a visit to the town hall by the great American evangelist Dwight L. Moody. From this point Catherine Marsh lived in the O'Rorke household and never married. After her father, the love of her life was Caroline Fuller-Maitland. The connection with the Sutherlands was deepened by Catherine Marsh's activities in 1866. While she was staying at Stafford House, their London home, the Duke remarked on an outbreak of cholera in the East End of London Catherine worked for some months in direct contact with cholera patients. She then established convalescent homes in cottages donated by the Liberal MP Sir Fowell Buxton at Warlies in Essex, and later in two houses at Brighton. Once Julius Elliott, now ordained, was ready to take over at his Brighton chapel, the Duke of Sutherland presented Henry O'Rorke to the vicarage of Sheriffhales, recently vacated by John Hinckley's death. Newspaper coverage remarked that the living was worth £614 and a house. The existing vicarage house was no longer suitable for middle-class family living.

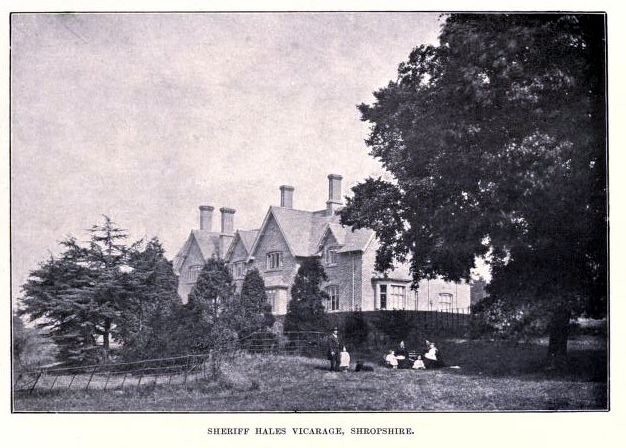
The Vicarage of St Mary's Church, Sheriffhales, pictured shortly after it was rebuilt in 1870. The foreground shows the O'Rorkes and Catherine Marsh. The building was later renamed Sutherland House.

O'Rorke and his family moved to Sheriffhales early in 1868. The replacement of the vicarage followed shortly afterwards, causing a delay to Catherine Marsh's move. By the time of the 1871 census, they were settled at the Sheriffhales vicarage. There were now three daughters, one born in Brighton and two at Brompton, Middlesex (probably referring to the rectory at Beckenham), and a son born in Knightsbridge. Lucy O'Rorke was revealed by the census to be a native of Bridgnorth. Catherine Marsh was reported to depend on a private income. There was a complement of five female servants, including a lady's maid, Charlotte Maitland, who had been born in Switzerland, and a nurse, perhaps for the children. Another daughter, Modwena, was born in London during their Sheriffhales years. The family were unused to rural life, although they had considerable previous contact with the West Midlands. The Duchess of Sutherland was an early visitor and was frequently resident at Lilleshall Hall, which is in St Mary's parish, then connected to the church by an avenue of lime trees. The Sutherland residence was frequently visited by political and religious luminaries. Catherine Marsh wrote twelve books during her time at Sheriffhales. She delivered a short talk each week in the schoolroom, after Henry O'Rorke had finished Evensong.

Henry O'Rorke is portrayed by his wife as a vicar strongly focussed on his pastoral responsibilities. In 1877 she contributed a series of vignettes to a publication entitled Sunlight Through Shadows, several alluding to parish work. The first describes the first funeral in the parish, which was that of Thomas Ward, a Londoner who had been injured at work and was staying with his sister's family at Sheriffhales. The piece is shaped partly as a conversion narrative, with Ward responding to pastoral visits by taking Communion for the first time. Henry O'Rorke's own parish journal is quoted to show the provision of regular pastoral visits over a period of at least six weeks. Inevitably it ends with Ward's burial on 26 June 1868, 'in sure and certain hope of the joyful resurrection.' Most of the pieces are more obviously fictionalised but some seem to relate to parish practice and a number have easily-recognisable references to the topography of Sheriffhales. A tragic tale of a young man dying in the snow begins: "On a grassy knoll, where three roads meet, stands the old church of our village, and just outside the rustic gate that leads to the chancel path is a favourite resort of the farm lads when their day's work is ended." This leads to a description of educational club nights for young labourers during the winter months, located directly across the road from the church, in a cottage on the old vicarage site. There is an account of home communion administered to a dying woman, which makes clear that there was a pattern of visits and care for the sick and aged.

O'Rorke was an enthusiastic preacher, making sure his activities were well publicised and well-structured to maximise attendance. In Lent 1870, for example, he launched a series of Sunday sermons and weekday services in schoolrooms, taking in Woodcote, Heath Hill and Chadwell in addition to St Mary's. He made numerous public appearances, sometimes championing evangelical causes, sometimes simply showing an interest in the local community and economy. Typical of the latter would be a visit to Bridgnorth with a party from the Lilleshall Company, Sutherland's mining and manufacturing firm. As on most public occasions he was accompanied by Charles Randal Bradburne, who had been his curate but was now Vicar of Lilleshall. Causes O'Rorke took up from the beginning of his ministry at Sheriffhales were the British and Foreign Bible Society and the Church Missionary Society In 1873 the harvest festival collections were for the Bible Society and the London Society for Promoting Christianity Amongst the Jews

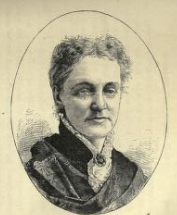
Mary Coffin Johnson from "The Temperance Reform and its Great Reformers : an Illustrated History", by William Haven Daniels, 1878.

However, the Temperance movement quickly came to be O'Rorke's focal interest. A Miss Dutton was said to have launched the movement in Sheriffhales parish. The First Anniversary gathering of the Sheriffhales Temperance Society was held in the autumn of 1872 with a tea party and public meeting at the National School in the village. O'Rorke read a psalm and prayed, his regular contribution to public events. Perhaps surprisingly, at the 13th anniversary festival of the Lilleshall Temperance Society in summer 1874, which he attended with his wife Lucy, he revealed that this was only his second attendance as a total abstainer from alcohol, and that he now regretted not abstaining earlier in his life. By the following year, the Lilleshall branch was beginning to draw celebrity temperance speakers. After O'Rorke given an address, Rebekah Hind Smith, a well-known activist from Leeds, spoke on British Workmen public houses, which provided non-alcoholic refreshment and entertainment. In 1876 O'Rorke took with him international big names in the movement when he attended the Shifnal branch's reception for Shrewsbury activists, bringing along Mary Coffin Johnson and her husband Eli, of Brooklyn, who were staying at Sheriffhales vicarage. The Johnsons made a welcome speech to the Shrewsbury contingent when they reached Aston Hall, on the eastern side of Shifnal. They were on a tour of England, involving 150 drawing room meetings.

Perhaps the most solemn occasion of O'Rorke's time at Sheriffhales was the funeral in 1874 of John Cotes, the lord of the manor at Woodcotes, who had been a Whig MP for North Shropshire forty years earlier. There was a very large turn-out: the Wellington Journal thought that virtually all the cottagers of the estate were present, along with numerous mourners from far and near. Bradburne and O'Rorke shared the service, which was at Woodcote Chapel, not St Mary's. The wreaths were laid by Charles Cecil Cotes, John's heir, who was elected MP for Shrewsbury a week later. Charles Cotes was a popular figure in the neighbourhood, not only because he "sumptuously entertained" the local schoolchildren, who were invited to his home from the Sheriffhales and Woodcote schools in large parties.

Cotes was a supporter of the Temperance movement and a Gladstonian Liberal. At this point his party was out of office and Gladstone was not popular even within his own party. Catherine Marsh had been described as a "staunch Protestant but liberal Christian," a stance that had possible contradictions within it. She and the O'Rorkes argued for the Public Worship Regulation Act 1874, a measure supported by the Disraeli government which made it possible to prosecute Anglo-Catholic clergy for using unauthorized liturgy. Marsh wrote to O'Rorke exulting in Shaftesbury's support for the measure and drawing attention to the High Churchman Gladstone's attempt to sabotage it with a series of amendments. A few years later, they supported Disraeli's stance in the Russo-Turkish War (1877–1878), welcoming a peaceful resolution in the Congress of Berlin. While William Gladstone campaigned fiercely on the issue of Ottoman atrocities against Christians, Catherine Marsh penned a Christian Zionist preface to Lucy O'Rorke's Sunlight Through Shadow, entirely out of keeping with the subject matter of the book. She hoped a Jewish homeland would be made possible by Britain's peaceful commercial and political penetration of the Ottoman Empire. However Marsh corresponded regularly with Gladstone, despite their differences, and the very bitter debates of the period seem not to have affected the warm friendship between the O'Rorkes and Charles Cotes.

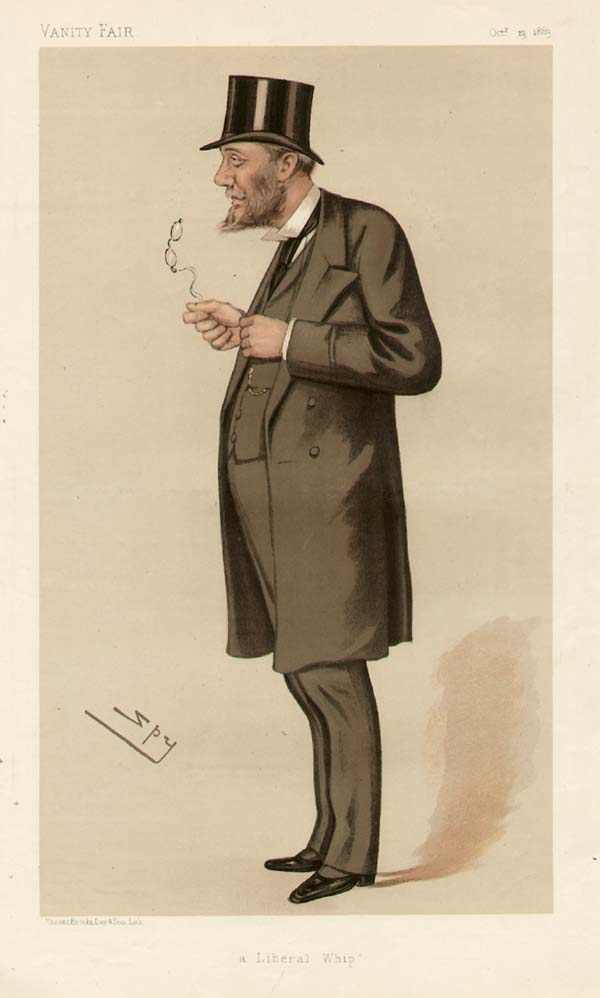
Charles Cecil Cotes, a caricature from Vanity Fair, 1883.

Henry O'Rorke's health broke down in December 1878 and he was recommended to go to a warm climate to recover. He took a winter holiday in Menton and Sanremo. A clergyman who was employed to deputise for him while he was away began to exhibit threatening behaviour, carrying a loaded revolver. Charles Cotes, who was a local Justice of the Peace, was visiting the vicarage to discuss the situation with Lucy O'Rorke and Catherine Marsh when the man pushed his way into the house, demanding to see Mrs O'Rorke alone. The two women went to confront him but he ran away and hid in an evergreen thicket as soon as he spotted Cotes. Later he returned and an alarm bell was sounded, resulting in Cotes and three local workmen rushing back to the vicarage to renew the pursuit, but the cleric escaped through the snow in the direction of the Shifnal road. The three workmen, Samuel Shotton, the blacksmith, Albert Hales, a carpenter, and Enoch Walker, a forester, kept watch at the vicarage overnight and the assailant was later arrested by a Constable Pearson. The clergyman was taken to Coton Hall Asylum. The incident was a considerable sensation, picked up by the national press from the local newspapers. Both Pearson and Cotes were widely praised for their courage.

Henry O'Rorke returned to Sheriffhales briefly in the summer of 1879 but had already been presented to the rectory of Feltwell in Norfolk by Hugh Cairns, 1st Earl Cairns, then Lord Chancellor. Sutherland decided on Bradburne as his replacement before he and his family left for Norfolk. The final event, held on 24 October in a large mission tent, was a presentation by parishioners of gifts to both Henry O'Rorke and Catherine Marsh for their services to the parish. The following day, the Wellington Journal announced an auction sale for to be held at the vicarage on 4 November, offering bidders not only a choice of "modern and substantial household furniture" but also four hay stacks, a dairy cow and pigs.

==== Charles Randal Bradburne ====
Charles Randal Bradburne succeeded Henry O'Rorke as Vicar of Sheriffhales in November 1879. He was forty years old and had served as a curate at Sheriffhales, initially as assistant to John Hinckley but also with O'Rorke until 1869, when the Duke of Sutherland presented him to the vicarage of Lilleshall. Bradburne was a Staffordshire man, born at Edial, a hamlet of Burntwood, in 1839. His parents were Randal and Mary Bradburne, and he had at least four older siblings. Randal Bradburne was not of gentry status but the 1851 census described him as a farmer of 124 acres and four labourers. Charles was not staying at home during this census but was to be found boarding at a school in Cotton, Staffordshire. This cannot have been Cotton College, an important Roman Catholic school, as it was not opened at that site until 1873. However, there was a small Catholic school at Cotton prior to the college and Frederick William Faber, who headed the Catholic community in Cotton, referred to construction of a new school building in a letter of October 1846. Randal Bradburne died in 1855, two years before Charles matriculated at Trinity College, Oxford, on 30 May 1857.

Charles Bradburne graduated BA in 1860 and MA in 1863. Meanwhile he was ordained deacon by the Bishop of Winchester in 1861 and priest by the Bishop of Lichfield in 1862. Bradburne served as curate at Burton upon Trent but the various editions of Crockford's do not give precise dates. O'Rorke had also been curate at Burton, but a little earlier. It is not certain that Bradburne met O'Rorke before 1867. Lucy O'Rorke mentions their acquaintance only as dating from their work toigether at Sheriffhales.

Bradburne became curate at Sheriffhales in 1864. He must have married Sarah Catharine Husband, shortly afterwards, as the couple had a five year old son by the time of the 1871 census. Born at Appleford-on-Thames, then in Berkshire, around 1835, Sarah was the daughter of a clergyman from Hampshire, Thomas Husband, who held a series of curacies in Berkshire. Bradburne was presented to the vicarage of Lilleshall by the Duke of Sutherland in 1869. The population was given as 1700 in 1870, almost double that of Sheriffhales, but the living was worth only about half as much: £350 plus a house. The 1871 census recorded Charles and Sarah as having three sons and a daughter. Despite the relatively low clerical income, they still afforded four female servants. In 1881, after Sutherland moved Bradburne to Sheriffhales, the family had expanded by a further four children, although the domestic staff had been reduced to three.

In the early years as vicar of Sheriffhales, Bradburne's name was kept in the newspapers by minor events and mishaps. In September 1880 he appeared as a prosecution witness before the magistrates at Penkridge, in what was described as a sacrilege case. He attested that he had seen the defendant, Charles Blacksidge, a young painter working on a headstone in the churchyard, shortly before a communion cloth, two napkins and several pieces of candle disappeared from the church. the charge was actually one of burglary, and the defence challenged the wording on the grounds that the church was open at the time of the alleged theft, so the defendant would have had no need to break into it. The painter was remanded to the Stafford assizes, where it transpired that he had a solid alibi for the occasion and he was found not guilty. The following year Bradburne, accompanied by his wife, a Miss Bradburne (possibly a sister) and some friends, narrowly escaped disaster, when a wagonette carrying them on a leisure drive lost its front wheels on a steep slope near Shifnal. The horse was less fortunate.

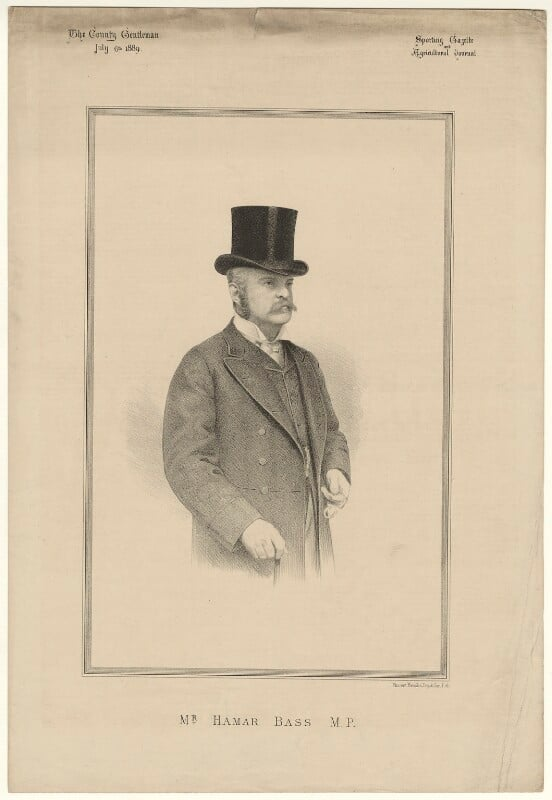
Lithograph portrait of Liberal politician Hamar Bass by Vincent Brooks. Published 6 July 1889 in the County Gentleman. NPG D21497 © National Portrait Gallery, London

Bradburne kept up the support for evangelical causes he had shown when working with O'Rorke. He continued to promote the Bible Society, for example. He was a noted Temperance speaker. At Gnosall, late in his career, he spoke particularly of his support for total abstinence from alcohol as the surest remedy for drunkenness. The Church Missionary Society remained one of his causes: he and his curate, William Wegg, addressed a large outdoor gathering at Sheriffhales in support of the organisation in 1889. However, Bradburne was particularly concerned with education, whether religious or secular. In 1880 he was reported giving two "plain, practical discourses" at an event supporting the church schools in Madeley. In 1881, the theme continued as he gave a speech, described as powerful and practical, at the laying of the first stone of a school at Norton Canes. In the 1885 general election campaign Bradburne was reported as questioning Hamar Bass, the Liberal candidate for West Staffordshire, on the subject at a meeting in Sheriffhales, apparently eliciting satisfactory answers from Bass, who was committed to Gladstone's manifesto, including free education. It is likely that Bradburne was well-acquainted with Bass, who was of the brewing family from Burton upon Trent.

The Three Links, an emblem of the Oddfellows movement.

Bradburne was committed to the Oddfellows movement, then a powerful friendly society with numerous insurance schemes. The Oddfellows were, however more than just a financial institution, as they had a liberal ideology, explicitly non-sectarian and strongly supportive of education. Bradburne's local branch was the Lord Frederick Lodge of Oddfellows Manchester Union Friendly Society, which met in its own clubhouse at the Plough Inn at Weston Heath. An anniversary event in 1889 involved a procession from the Plough, with a marching band, following a circular route through Woodcote and Sheriffhales. It stopped at St Mary's for a service, led and addressed by Bradburne, before going back to the Plough to feast in a large marquee.

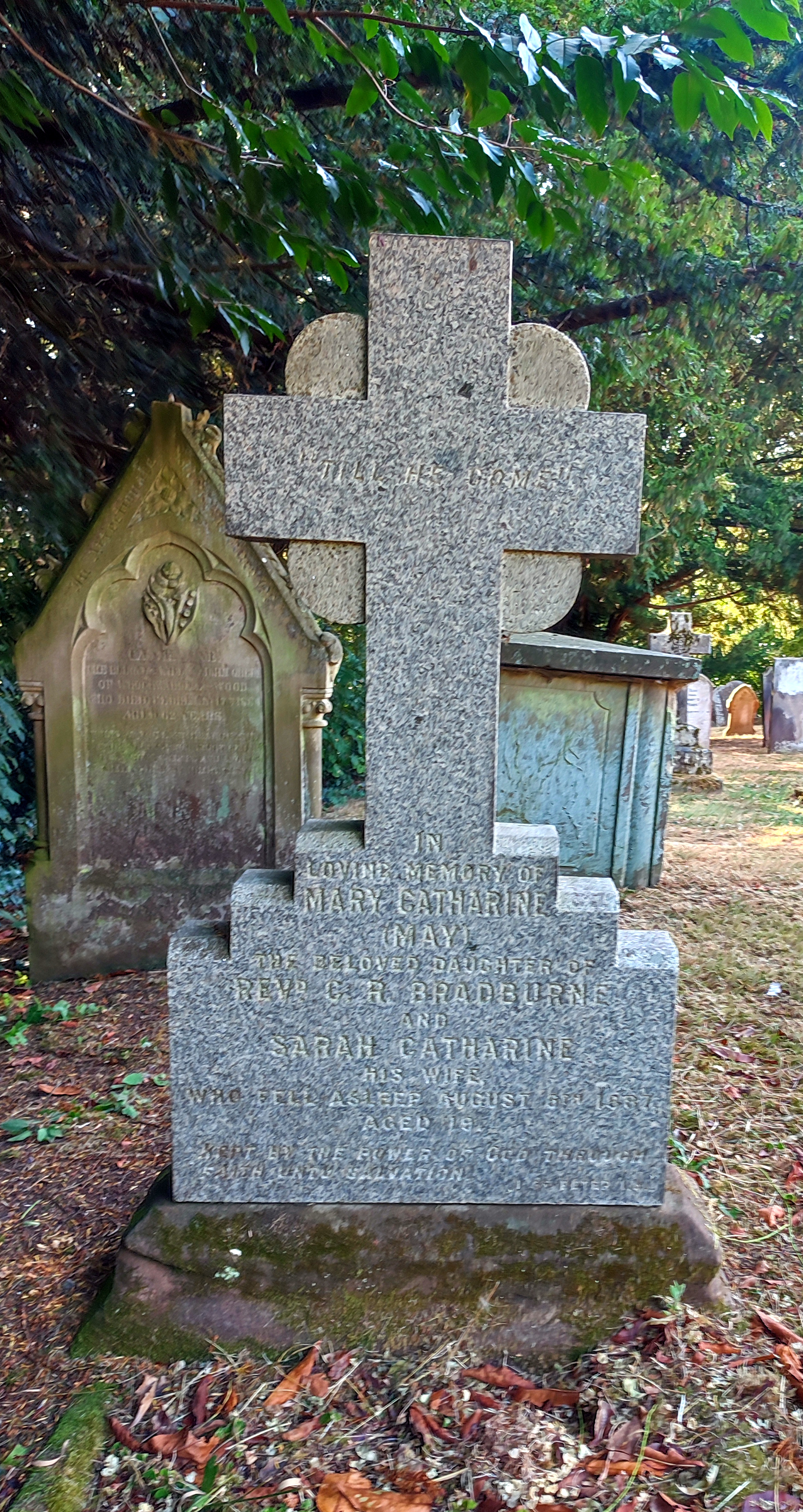
Grave of Mary Catharine Bradburne, daughter of Charles Randal and Sarah Catharine Bradburne.

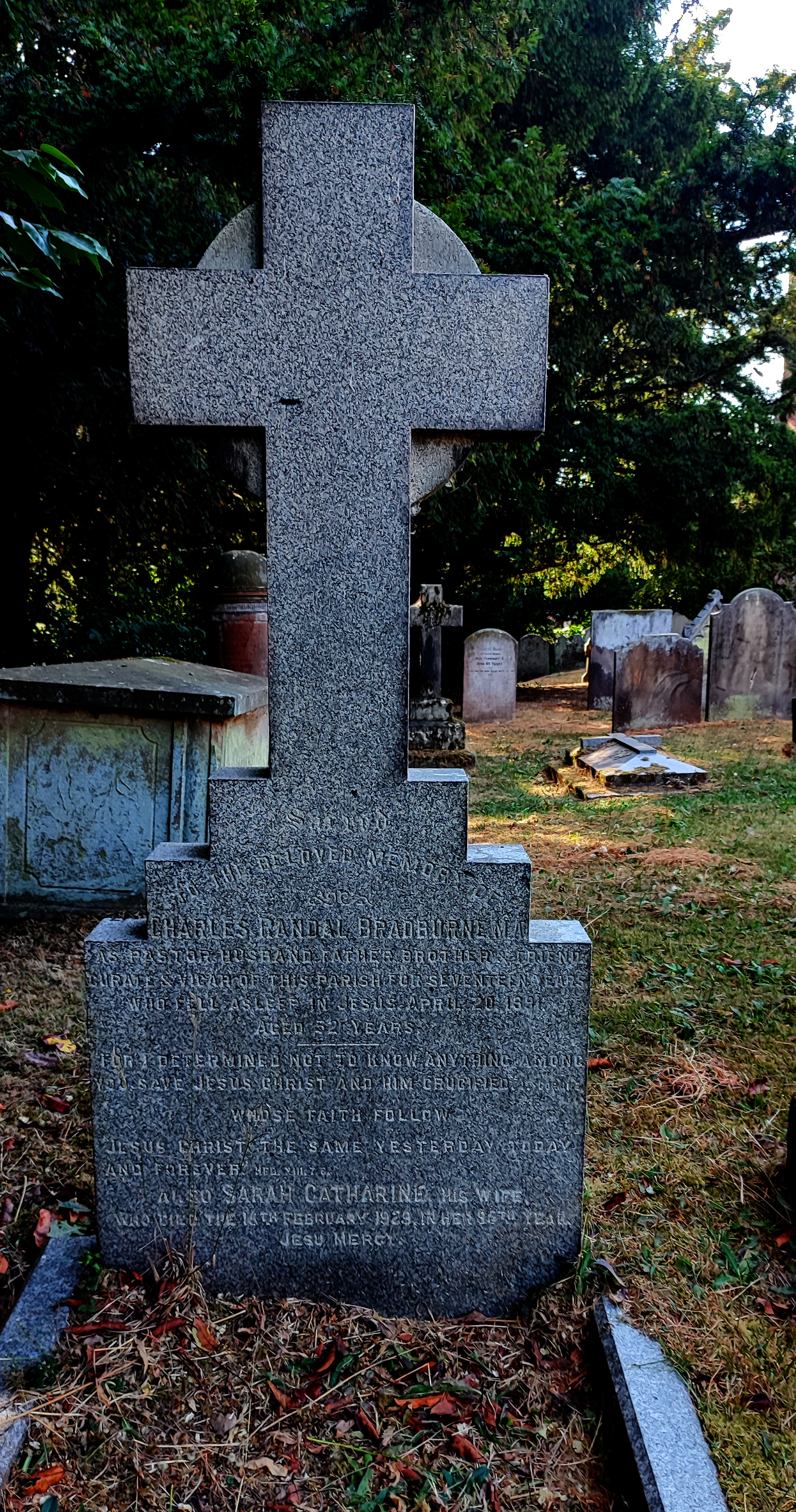
Grave of Charles Bradburne, St Mary's Church Sheriffhales

Mary Catharine, the Bradburnes' eldest daughter died in 1887 at the age of 19. The funeral was observed with great solemnity by the parish. Press coverage noted that the young woman had been a great supporter of her father's ministry in Sheriffhales and had strong links to the YWCA. The service was conducted by the curate, William Wegg, and Andrew Burn, the vicar of Kynnersley.

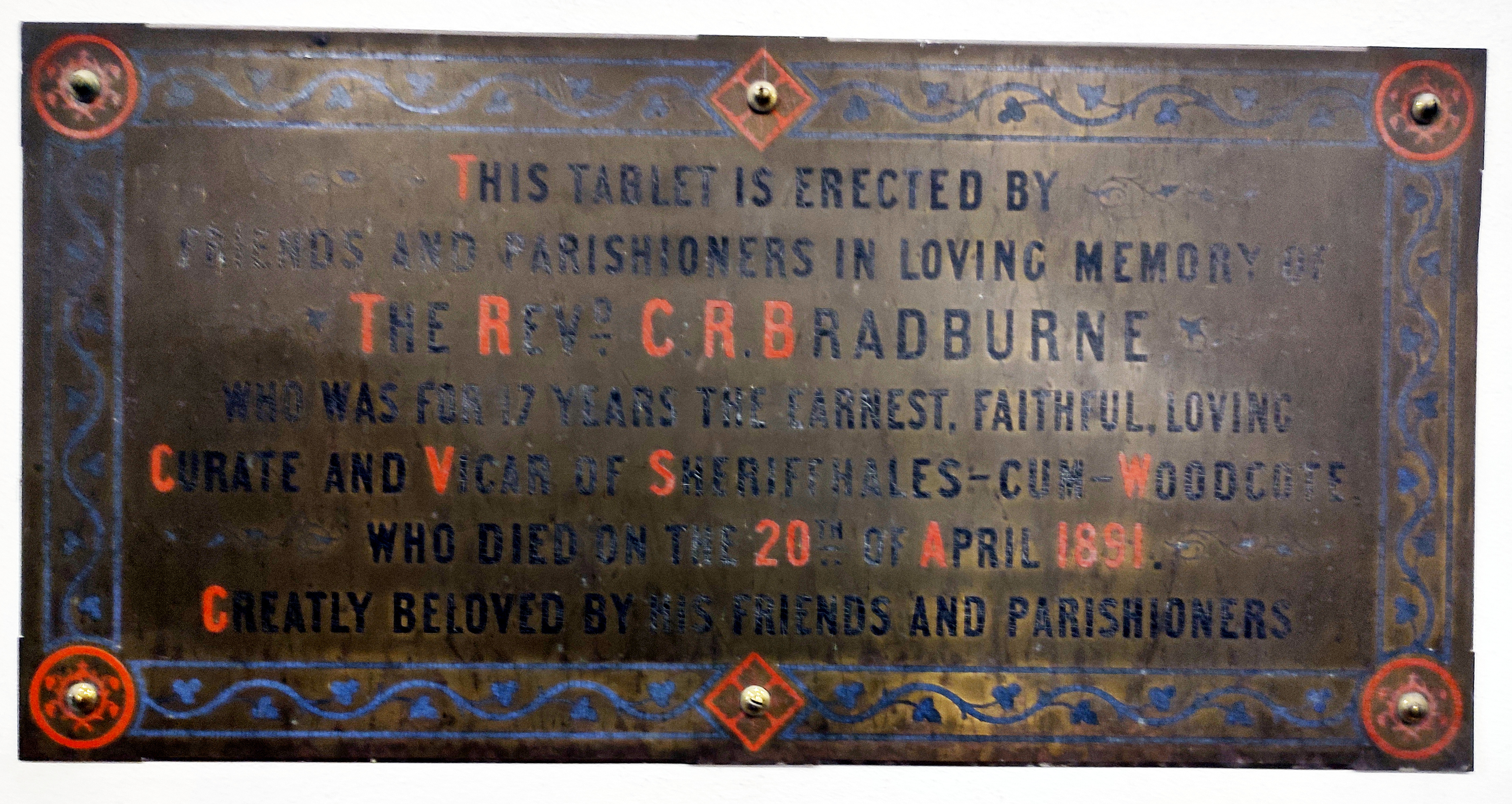
Memorial to Rev Charles Randal Bradburne in St Mary's Church Sheriffhales.

At the 1891 census the Bradburne household was greatly reduced in size. Of the children only three – Humphrey, Eleanor and Henrietta – were living with their parents at that time. Charles Bradburne survived for only a few more weeks. He had developed what was described as "congestion of the lungs" and, just as he appeared well enough recovered to take a holiday that had been booked in Bournemouth, he died on 20 April 1891. His funeral was a major occasion with large numbers of parishioners and clergy from surrounding parishes attending. It was conducted by Melville Scott, the Archdeacon of Stafford, Bradburne's friend and colleague, Henry O'Rorke, and William Wegg. The local press report commented on Bradburne's kindness of disposition, good humour and encouraging attitude. A meeting in the vestry of St Mary's resolved to erect a memorial to Bradburne and this was subsequently attached to the wall of the north aisle.

==== William Wegg ====
William Wegg was Bradburne's deputy throughout his time as vicar of Sheriffhales. He was considerably older than Bradburne, born at Deptford, Kent, in 1823. He graduated from King's College, London, as a Theological Associate of King's College in 1853. This was a new path to becoming a Church of England priest: KCL had opened the course only in 1846. Wegg was ordained deacon in the year he graduated and priest the following year. He never obtained a living but had always been a curate: in Mordiford, Abergavenny, Lymington, New Wortley, Macclesfield, Crewe and Wolverhampton before arriving in Sheriffhales. In 1891 he was living at Woodcotes with his wife, Sarah, his adult daughter, also Sarah, and his sister, Harriett. He seems to have retired when Bradburne died and the 1895 edition of Crockford's reported him living at Holly Grove, Newport.

=== The Victorian restoration ===
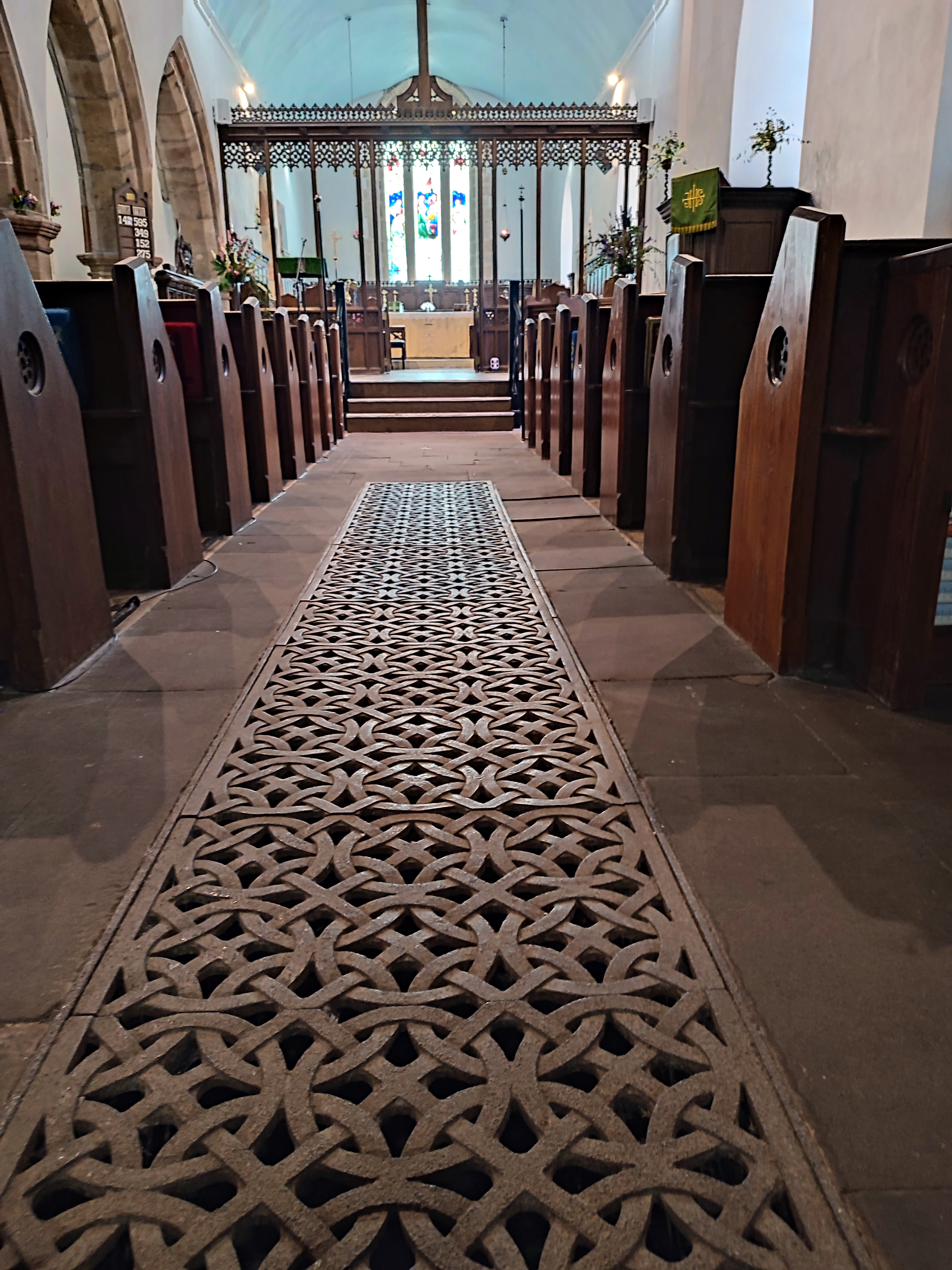
Sheriffhales church interior - view from west. The elevated chancel is visible in the distance. The ornate heating vents are very prominent at the western end of the central passage.

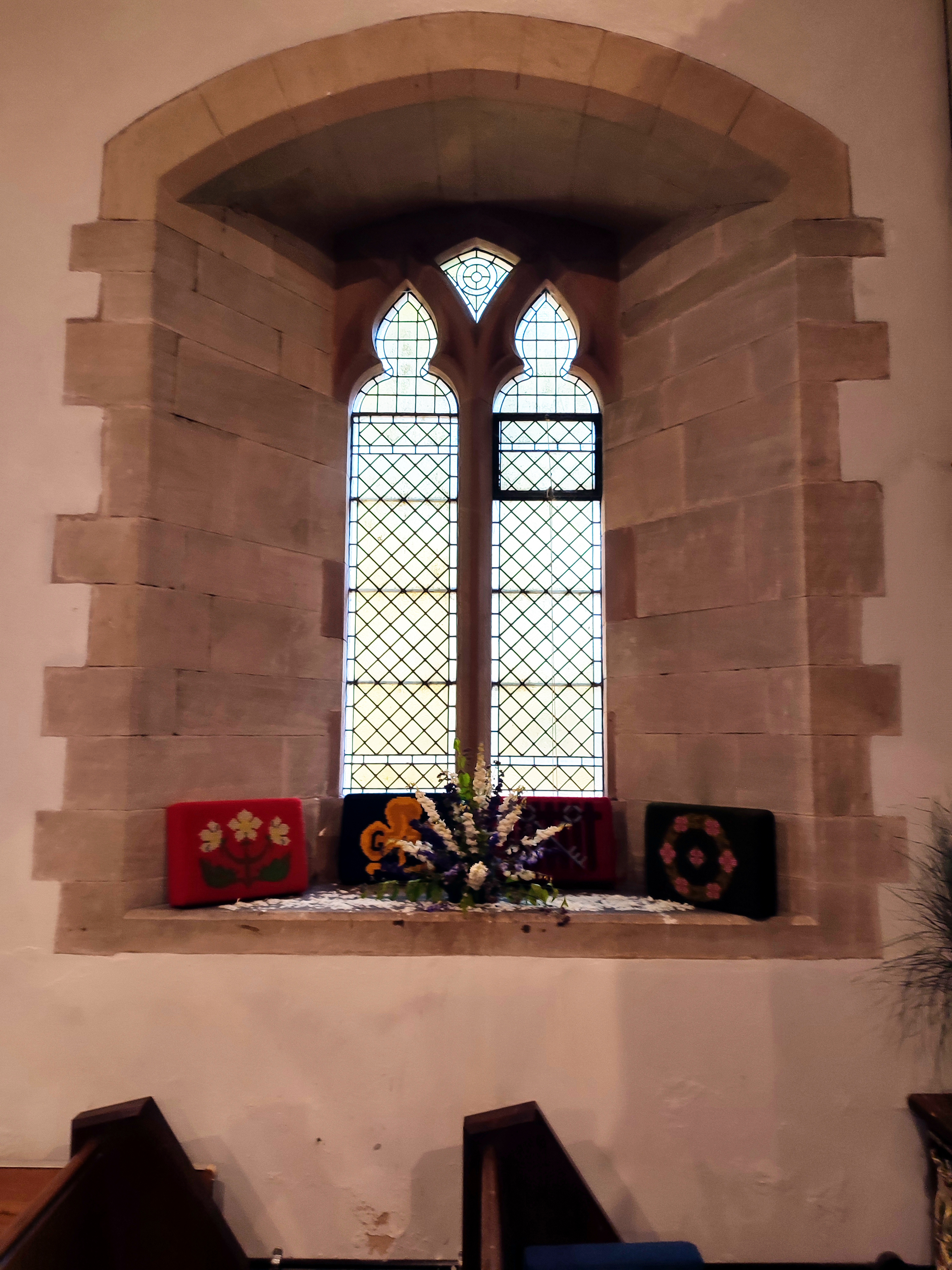
Sheriffhales north aisle window. Two identical stone tracery windows replaced the original timber frames.

The Victorian restoration of St Mary's Church was carried out while Charles Randal Bradburne was vicar. The reopening was reported by the Wellington Journal as occurring on 21 May 1884. The reopening was a major occasion, with large numbers of clergy visiting the parish, including the Bishop of Lichfield, William Maclagan, and Henry O'Rorke, who both preached on the day.

The restoration cost about £1200 (equivalent to £117,322 in 2025) and about £400 was still owing at the completion. It was carried out by a Mr Yates of Shifnal. The architect was Thomas Henry Fleeming (1849–1935), an exponent of Gothic Revival architecture, whose office was on Darlington Street, Wolverhampton. Fleeming was a young man, only 25 years old at the re-opening. He was to make a considerable mark on his own town, but his major commissions, like the Eye Infirmary and the Barclay's Bank Building, all lay in the future.

The most important changes made to the church were

- Raising the floor of the chancel to a height of three steps, thus making the altar more prominent.
- Separation of nave and chancel by a low stone wall.
- Replacement of wooden windows in the north aisle with tracery and cathedral glass.
- Transfer of the organ from the western gallery to the east end of the north aisle, a temporary measure which remains in force in 2026.
- Installation of new seating throughout, with choir stalls for the chancel and open pitch pine seats for the nave.
- Solid block flooring throughout the seating area, with stone for passage ways.
- Removal of large areas of plaster work, including the ceiling of the north aisle, to reveal stone walls and wooden beams.
- Installation of a heating system powered by two Remington stoves.

The removal of plaster exposed frescoes of the Creation and Fall and of the Sacraments of the Catholic Church, presumably medieval. However, at that time it proved impossible to conserve them.

=== Clergy in an Age of Change ===
==== Arthur Tompson Michell ====
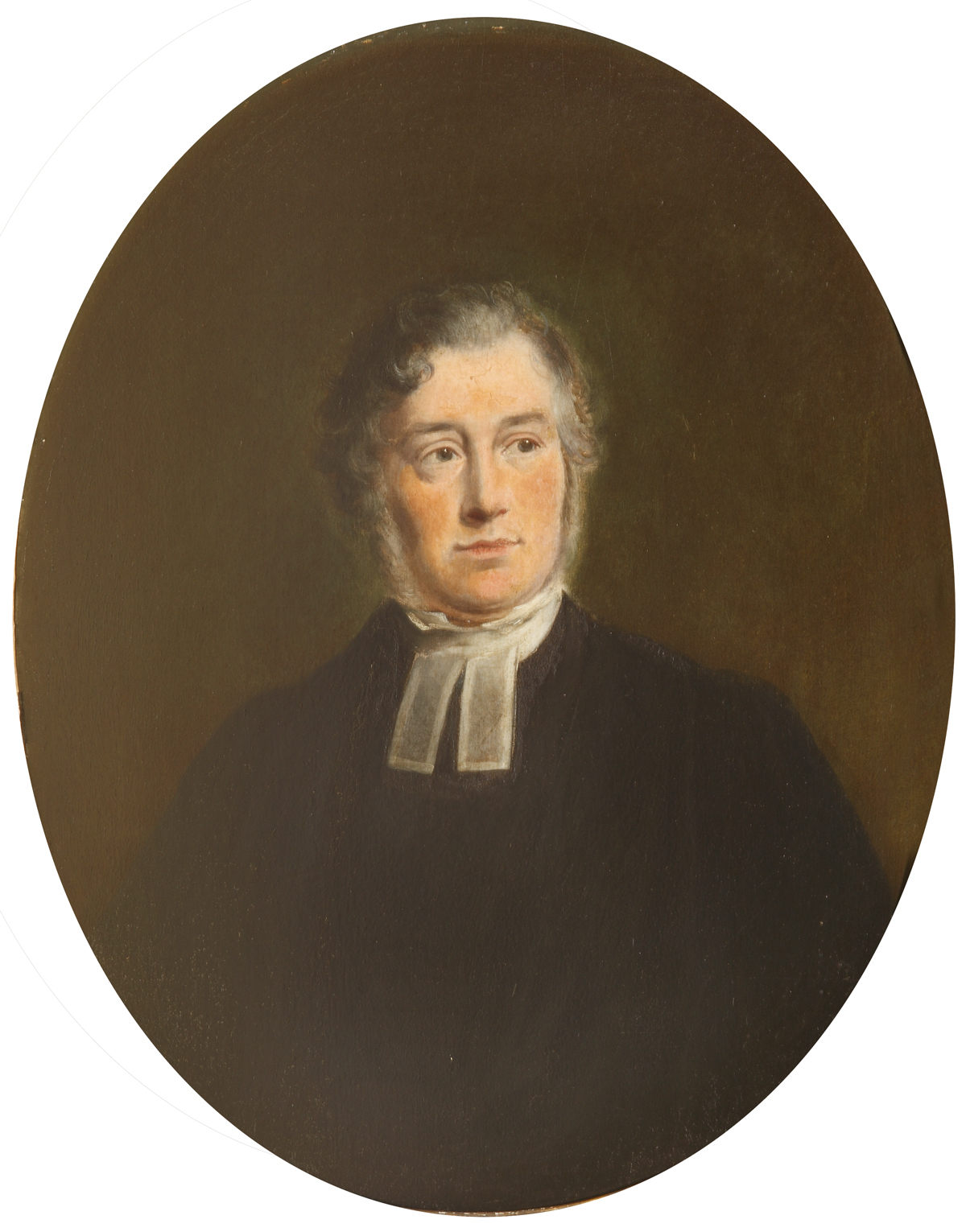
Richard Michell (1805–1877), clergyman and academic, father of Arthur and Mary Caroline Michell

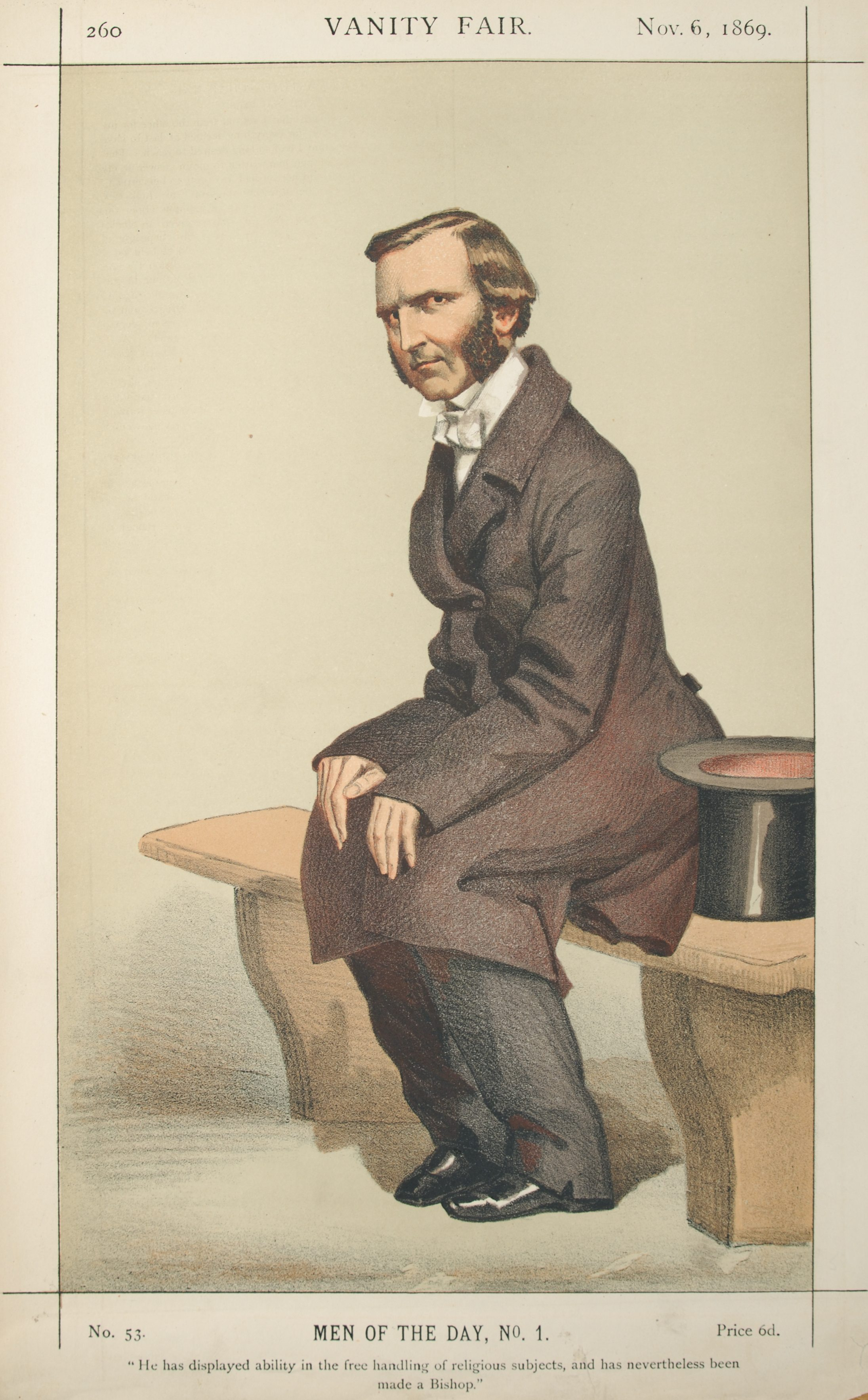
Frederick Temple, head of Rugby School 1858—1869, as shown in a Vanity Fair caricature, 1869.

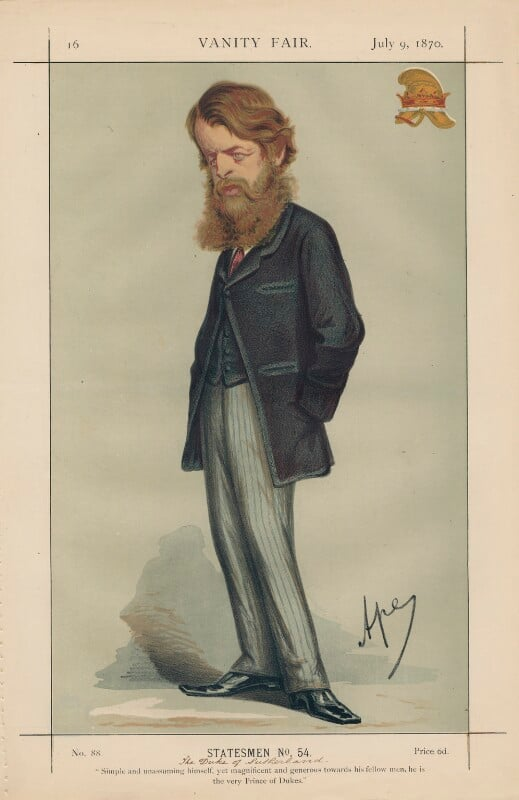
George Granville William Sutherland-Leveson-Gower, 3rd Duke of Sutherland, a Liberal peer and one of the richest men in Britain.

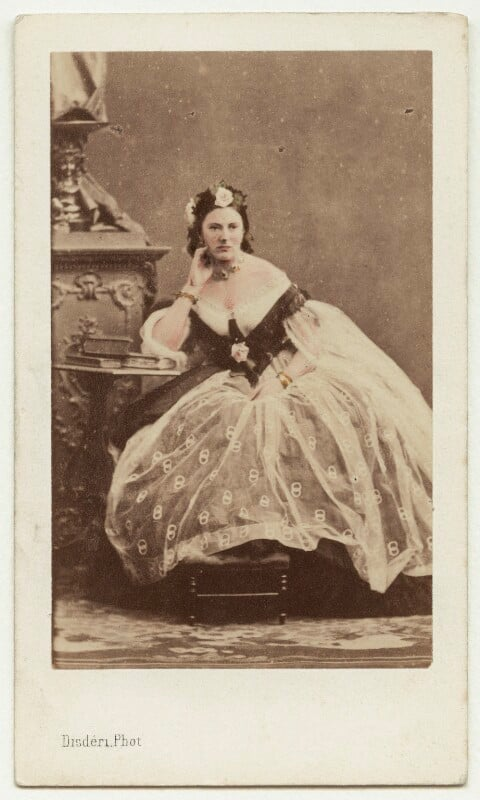
Anne Sutherland Leveson Gower, Duchess of Sutherland, a Liberal society hostess and courtier.

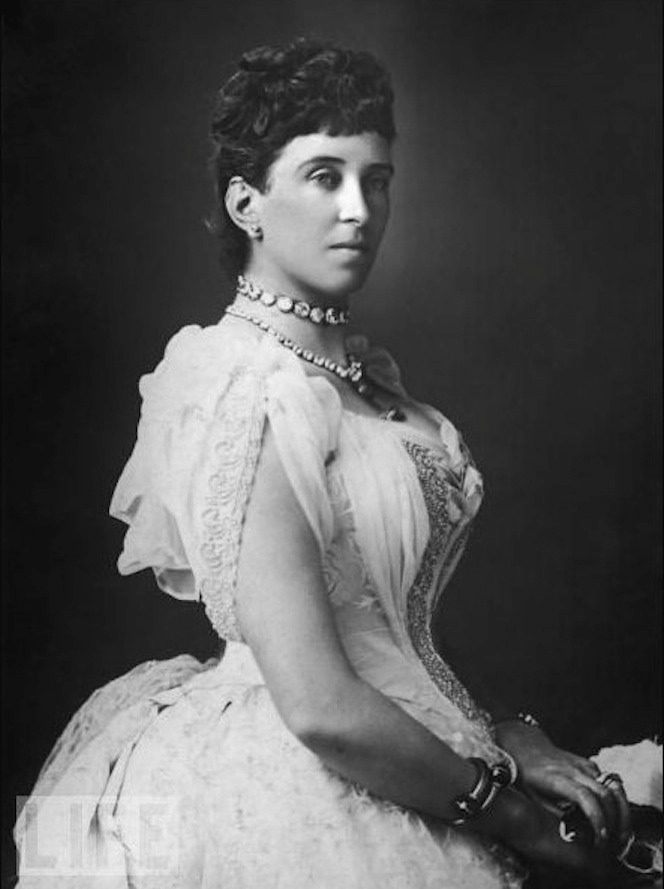
Mary Caroline Blair, the 3rd Duke of Sutherland's second wife and sister of Arthur Thompson Michell.

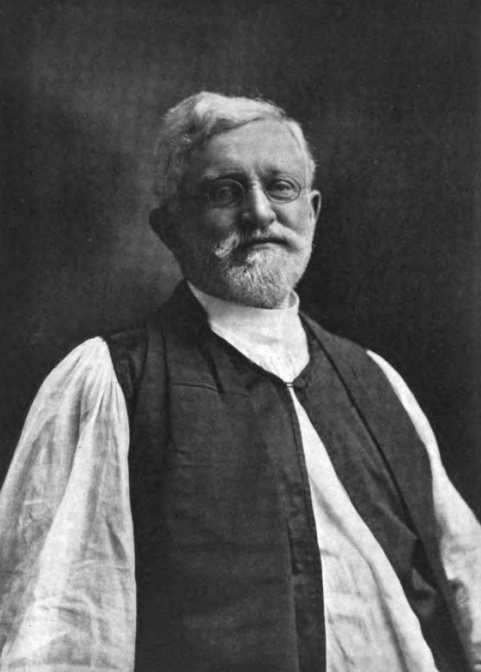
Edwin Gardner Weed, Bishop of Florida, who presided at marriage of the Duke of Sutherland and Mary Caroline Blair. Photographed 1913.

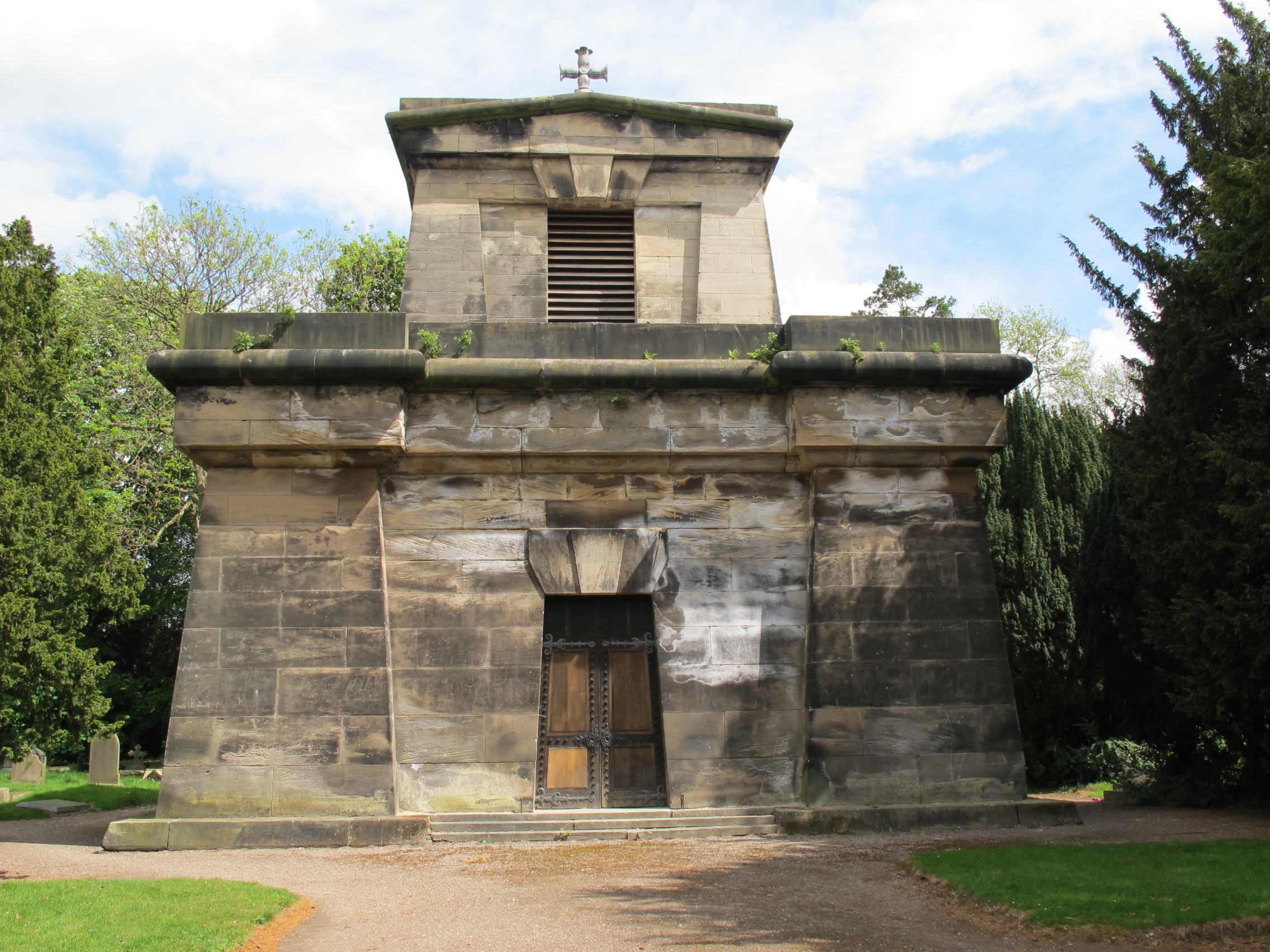
Trentham Mausoleum, the burial place of the first three Dukes of Sutherland.

The press reported that Arthur Tompson Michell had been offered the benefice of Sheriffhales and Woodcote on 1 May 1891, even before the reports of Charles Bradburne's funeral appeared. At that point he was correctly named as rector of Brampton, Norfolk. He was also reported to be "Diocesan Inspector of Schools," which was misleading, as his brief covered Anglican schools only in the Rural Deanery of South Ingworth. Michell was an experienced clergyman from a clerical family. Sheriffhales, although only a vicarage, offered him only a slightly better-paid post: about £690 (equivalent to £75,798 in 2025), against £660, hardly enough to uproot his family for the increase, especially as he and his wife Edith were imminently expecting the birth of their third child. However, the Duke of Sutherland and Arthur Michell were brothers-in-law and Michell's presentation was almost certainly intended to bring support to the Duke's second wife, Mary Caroline Blair, who was Arthur Michell's sister.

Arthur Tompson Michell and Mary Caroline Michell and were both born in Oxford, children of Richard Michell, a clergyman and academic, and of his wife Amelia Blair. They lived on St Giles', a major thoroughfare running north from the city centre. Mary was probably born at 36 St Giles, about 100m south of St Giles' Church, Oxford in 1848, but by the time of Arthur was born on 16 September 1852, the family had moved a short distance south to number 38. Richard Michell was elected Public Orator of the University in 1849 and in the same year delivered the Bampton Lectures. As principal of Magdalen Hall he steered its transformation into Hertford College, Oxford. Broadly evangelical, he was a committed Conservative and helped organise the party in Oxford. He died in his office at Hertford College in 1877.

Arthur Michell was a sixth child fifth son. From the age of 13 was educated at Rugby School, part of the intake of September 1866, when the school was headed by Frederick Temple, then a noted liberal theologian, who was later to become Archbishop of Canterbury. Michell then moved to Oxford, matriculating at Oriel College on 7 February 1871, achieving BA in 1874, and awarded MA in 1877. He was one of the earliest graduates from the honour school of theology, which had been set up in 1869, mainly through the work of Edward Pusey and Henry Liddon, key figures in the Anglo-Catholic movement in the Church of England. At university, he was a distinguished sportsman, whose career peaked around the time he graduated: a rower who won the University Sculls and captain of the university football team. He played rugby for England 1874–1876. Less distinguished was his academic performance, as he passed with 4th class honours. Michell was ordained deacon in 1879 at Winchester Cathedral and served as curate of Burghclere in Hampshire, where he married Edith Margaret Fox. He was ordained priest in 1881 and the following year moved to a curacy at St Laurence's Church, Upton-cum-Chalvey in Slough, where their son Gilbert was born. From 1885 Michell was Rector of Brampton, Norfolk. His two daughters, Mary and Margaret were born in this period, Margaret only 12 days before he was inducted into the benefice of Sheriffhales on 15 July 1891.

Mary, a few years older than Arthur, had first married Arthur Kindersley Blair, a former army officer, who became an estate manager for the Duke of Sutherland. She began an affair with the Duke around the time Blair died on 4 October 1883, in a shooting incident. Anne, the Duchess of Sutherland, died five years later, on 25 November 1888. This triggered a press frenzy, with constant rumours of the Duke's remarriage to "the fascinating Mrs. Blair" The lag before the actual wedding gave the press plenty of time for groundless speculation until on 5 March the fact emerged that Bishop Edwin Gardner Weed had conducted a public but quiet ceremony, at the newly-completed Church of the Good Shepherd in Dunedin, Florida.

By the time Michell and his family had settled into the vicarage at Sheriffhales, public interest in the ducal marriage had subsided. However, the Duke's death in September 1892 at Dunrobin Castle opened a new chapter in the scandal. There were early hints of family tensions, and some noted that his death might be seen as sudden, hinting, without foundation, at foul play. Arthur Michell accompanied his sister to the funeral, reading the lesson in the service and steadying her during the procession to Trentham Mausoleum.

Cromartie Sutherland-Leveson-Gower, 4th Duke of Sutherland, Mary's stepson, considered the provision for her in the 3rd Duke's will excessive. He excluded her from Tittensor Chase, a mock-Tudor mansion dating from about 1856, on the southern edge of the Trentham estate, that she claimed as a dower property. This led Arthur Michell to preach a sermon from the pulpit at St Mary's in which he made what were considered disparaging remarks about the new Duke of Sutherland. The church wardens met Michell and tried to obtain a public withrawal of his remarks, which he refused. In response, on 31 October a meeting of 300 in the school rooms passed a resolution declaring Michell's remarks "uncharitable, unjust and untrue" and expressing sympathy for the duke. It also asserted

"that the ministrations of the Vicar are not acceptable to the parish, and prays the Bishop of the diocese to use his influence to bring about a return of the happy relations that always existed between the vicars and the parishioners."

Michell persisted in supporting his sister against her stepson, the church's patron, throughout the unfolding scandal. Mary was forced by an injunction to hand over the family jewels to The Duke of Westminster, the trustee, as she had held them as a bargaining tool.

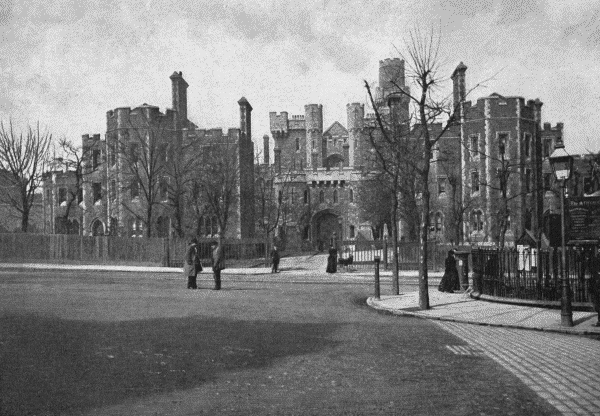
Holloway Prison in the 1890s. The Dowager Duchess of Sutherland was confined in a large apartment over the main gate.

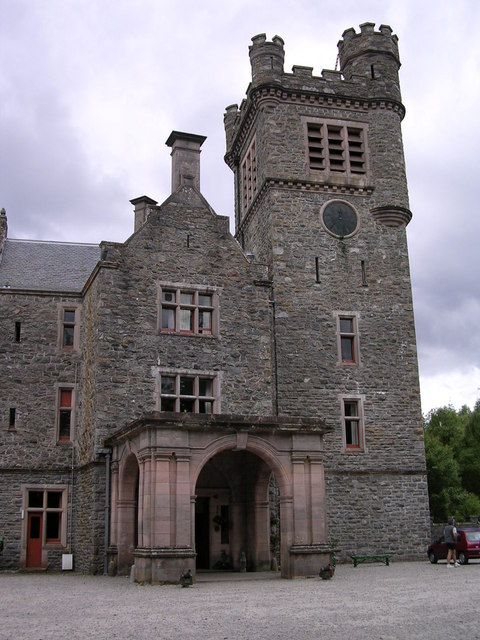
Carbisdale Castle, which was built for Mary Caroline Blair.

A local newspaper, the Lichfield Mercury, noted that Mary was staying with Arthur at Sheriffhales vicarage in March 1893, just as the scandal approached a climax. In April the Probate Division of the High Court sentenced Mary to a fine of £250 and six weeks imprisonment for contempt of court after she burnt a possibly relevant document. One of her brothers, possibly Arthur, accompanied her on her journey to HM Prison Holloway and met her on her release.

In June 1893, just after his sister's release, Arthur Michell was assaulted in St Mary's church yard at Sheriffhales, the case being heard by the magistrates at Penkridge. Michell had insisted that a local man, Thomas Plant of Lilyhurst, use a Biblical text on his wife's gravestone, instead of the verse Plant himself proposed. Although Plant agreed, the stonemason he had contracted, James Sharples of Oakengates, went ahead with the original inscription. When Michell tried to prevent its installation by standing at the head of the grave plot, he was forcibly removed by labourer Joseph Hines, at the direction of Sharples. Michell alleged that Sharples had said he would remove the stone for the Duke of Sutherland but not for him. The prosecution alleged that Sharples was trying to exacerbate relations between the vicar and the parish. The bench, headed by Baron Hatherton, commended Michell's conduct as "exemplary" but treated the assault as only technical, fining Sharples and Hines just a shilling each.

Arthur Michell's sister went on to retain most of what her husband had intended and became so rich that she was able to have her own castle built for her in Scotland. He seems to have lived down earlier conflicts and soon become actively involved in local life and his parish. As early as summer 1894 he was able to arrange an important day of celebration for the parish, with Lovelace Stamer, the Suffragan Bishop of Shrewsbury conducting a service of rededication to mark the rehanging of the bells at St Mary's. Michell and the churchwardens, John Critchley and Walter John Shuker, had managed to raise the funds for a new, sixth bell, the treble, to complete the peal and their names were inscribed on it. The service was seen by most of the congregation, as the ringing floor was still visible from the body of the church at this point.

In October 1896 Michell and the church were thanked for fruit they had sent from the harvest festival by Shifnal Board of Guardians, which administered the Poor Law locally. Michell had by this point become a member of the board. This was soon after the whole of the parish was transferred to Shropshire and both District and Parish Councils created under the terms of the Local Government Act 1894. By Jan 1903 Michell was a member of Shifnal District Council, and at that time he was active in discussions about the need for an isolation facility for smallpox patients. A Mr Hoole actually offered to provide a cottage at Sheriffhales for the purpose. These were simply early contributions to the work public bodies, which continued throughout the remainder of Michell's ministry. His death notice in the Shrewsbury Chronicle said that "he took an active part in local public affairs, and was one of the oldest members and most regular attender at the meetings of the Shifnal Board of Guardians and Rural District Council." Health concerns figured largely in this work and in 1910 Michell was a founder of the local branch of the county Association for the Prevention of Consumption, covering the Shifnal district, and aimed at setting up a Shropshire sanatorium.

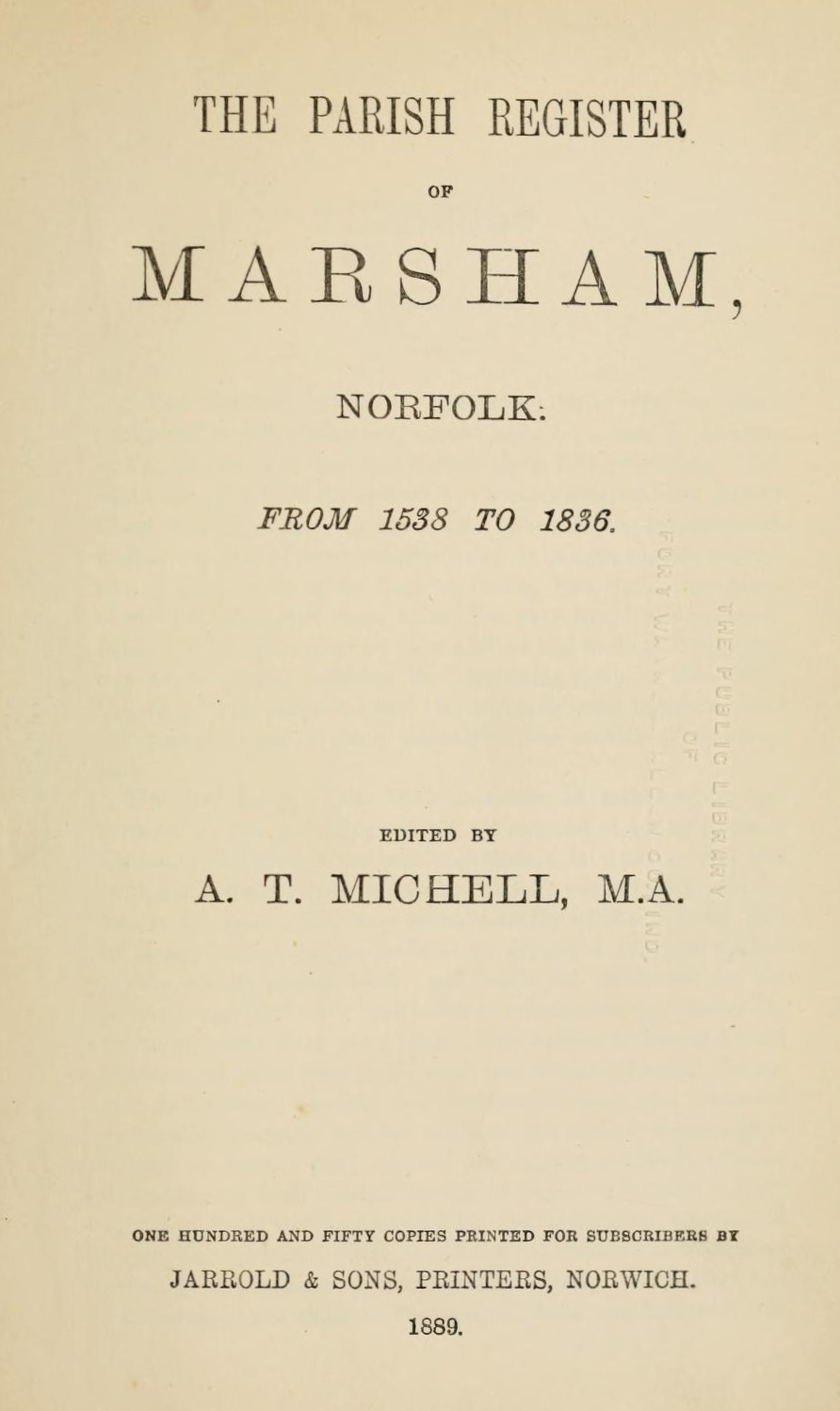
Title page of Marsham parish register, edited by A T Michell and published 1889, while he was rector of Brampton.

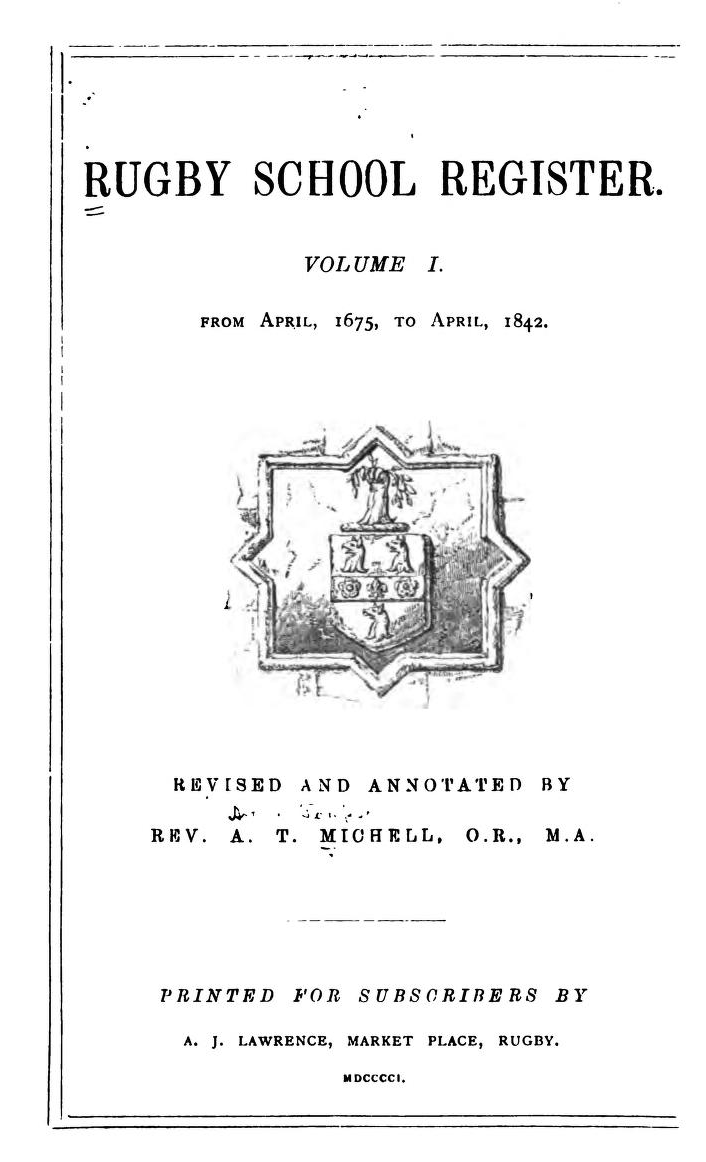
Rugby School Register volume 1, title page, edited by A T Michell, 1891. It ran to three volumes, completed in 1904.

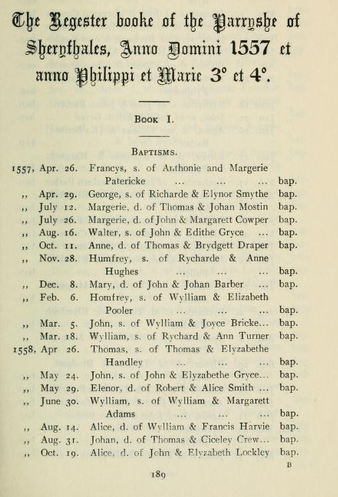
First page of the printed edition of the Sheriffhales, Shropshire, parish register, published 1909, as part of a volume of Shropshire registers.

Michell became recognised as an antiquarian elected in 1903 FSA: Fellow of the Society of Antiquaries of London. While at Brampton he had edited the records of the neighbouring parish of Marsham. His early years at Sheriffhales were punctuated by his publication of the Rugby School register. The first volume was issued in 1891 and the second in 1892. Only in 1904 did the third volume appear. By this time Michell was probably already working towards his edition of the Sheriffhales parish register. As early as 1900 he had attended a meeting of the Shropshire Parish Register Society in Shrewsbury, where he was thanked for his work on the project and Sheriffhales listed among the parishes due to have their records printed. This proved over-optimistic. The Sheriffhales register was not signed off by Michell until February 1908. It was published in 1909, as part of a volume with three other Shropshire parishes in Lichfield Diocese: Montford, Clive and Hordley. The secretary of the society, W G D Fletcher, acknowledged that Michell was responsible for all the work on Sheriffhales.

The 1901 census showed the Arthur Michell living with his two daughters, Mary aged 15, and Margaret aged 9, both born in Marsham. His wife was not at home during the census and their son Gilbert was away at Rugby School, where he was a student 1897–1902. There were five employees: a governess, a domestic nurse, a cook and two housemaids. A year later Edith was advertising for a "Cook (good plain) wanted, end September ; not under 24." Three years later she posted the same advertisement, except for dropping the qualifying age to 23.

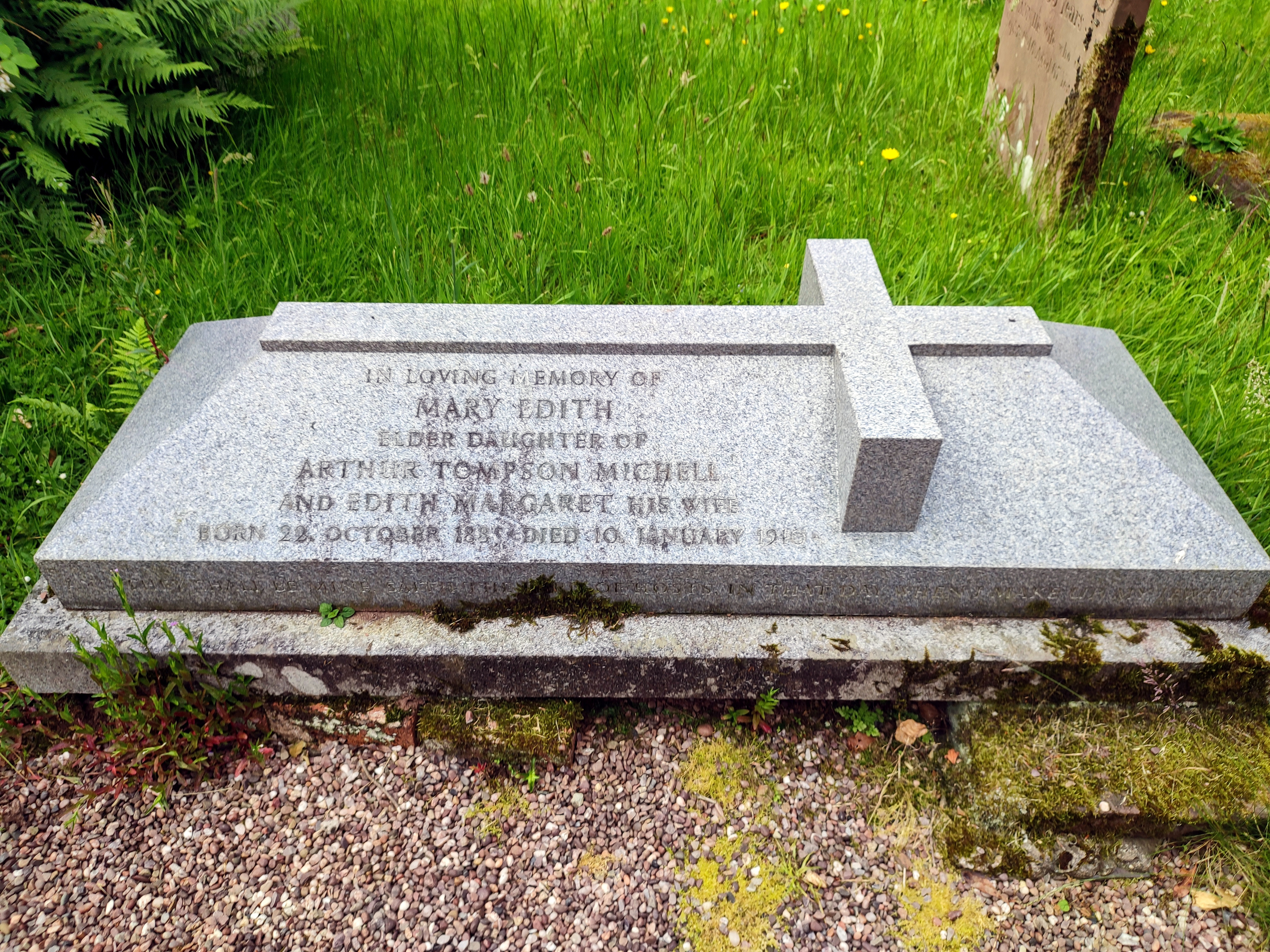
Grave of Mary Edith Michell, St Mary's Church, Sheriffhales, 1910

Like the Bradburnes, the Michells suffered the suffered the loss of their eldest daughter at Sheriffhales. Mary Edith Michell died on 10 January 1910 and was buried on 14 January. Her funeral, a huge affair, was conducted by Ernest Bridgeman, the Rector of Blymhill, assisted by the curate of St Mary's, Henry Tetlow. Also assisting was Mary's elder brother Gilbert Arthur Michell, who was then curate of St Barnabas Church, Oxford, and still a deacon, as he was priested later that year. Ironically, the local press report was followed by an article explaining that the death rate in England and Wales was at a historic low. The grave still occupies a very prominent place, next to the main entrance path to the church, just south of the nave.

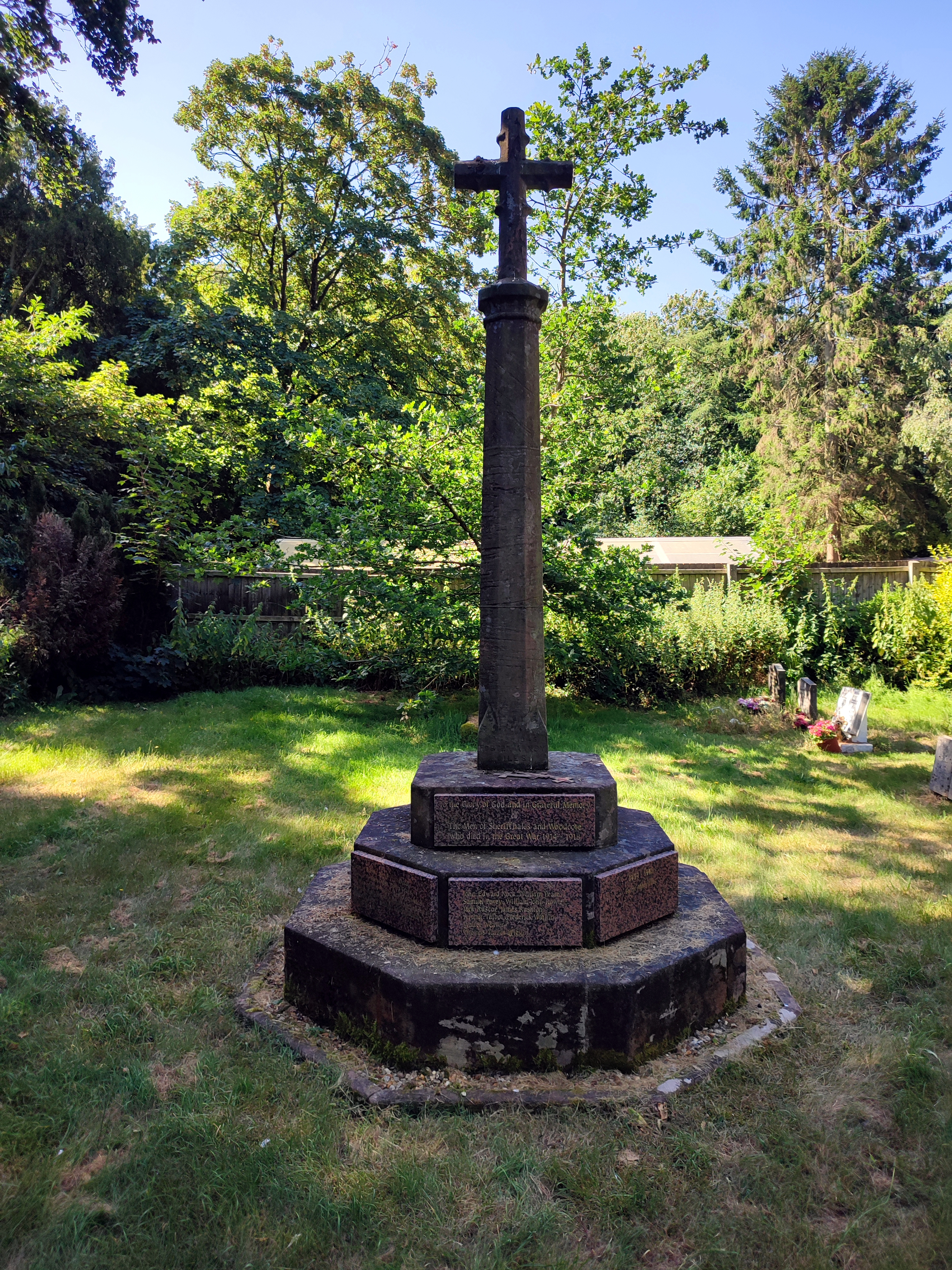
Sheriffhales war memorial, 1921

The outbreak of World War I in 1914 accelerated change and forced decisions on many landowners. When a meeting to discuss the erection of a war memorial met in Sheriffhales during May 1921, the entire power dynamic of the area had shifted. Arthur Michell pointed out that there had already been an attempt by a group of ex-service personnel to build a commemorative village hall, but it had failed through lack of funds. Both the Leveson-Gowers and the Cotes family of Woodcote had sold up and no-one had replaced them with the same combination of great wealth and local commitment. The meeting resolved to investigate the possibility of a more modest memorial and Michell convinced the meeting it should be in the church or churchyard. Well before the end of the year sufficient funds were forthcoming for a sandstone cross, bearing the names of the war dead of both Sheriffhales and Woodcote, which was installed in the southern extension to the churchyard. It was dedicated by John Kempthorne, the Bishop of Lichfield, on 5 December 1921. The subscribers were represented at the ceremony by Captain J Foster of Woodcote Hall.

It was Captain Foster again who presided at the parish's retirement presentation to Arthur Michell on 25 July 1922. He pointed out the scope of the changes Michell had witnessed, with almost every acre of land changing hands. Michell himself pointed out that Sheriffhales itself had been moved from Staffordshire to Shropshire earlier in his incumbency, with a consequent change of archdeaconry. He pronounced himself most happy with his work for the Board of Guardians and the Rural District Council. The presentation item was a silver kettle, which Edith Michell was not present to receive, being ill at the time.

Arthur and Edith Michell moved to Oxford and lived at 6 Crick Road, north of the university parks and close to Lady Margaret Hall. Arthur died at the age of 70 on 13 August 1923, less than a year after leaving the parish of Sheriffhales. His funeral was held at St Giles' Church, Oxford. His wife Edith outlived him by more than a decade, dying on 10 November 1934 at the age of 76.

==== Robbie Abney Giles ====
Sir John Leigh, who made the last lay presentation to the benefice of Sheriffhales. Newspaper photograph c. 1922.

A week before Michell's leaving party, a brief article in the local press had already announced Robble Abney Giles as his successor, giving brief details of his previous career, and mentioning Sir John Leigh as the patron. A mill owner based in Oldham, with large holdings in Lancashire and Cheshire, Leigh had inherited great wealth on his father's death in 1916. He had been made a baronet in the New Year Honours for 1918, a distinction which was widely associated with his huge donation of £50,000 towards treatment for disabled soldiers. Leigh had bought the Lilleshall estate in 1919 and established his summer home at Lilleshall Hall in Sheriffhales parish. As well as making numerous benefactions, he decided to invest a great deal of his wealth in purchases and activities reflecting his prestige. The Lilleshall purchase brought the traditional landowners' privilege of advowson: Leigh held three local livings. He and his wife, Norah, also established a London home at 6 Carlton House Terrace, one of the most prestigious addresses in the capital. By the end of 1920 Leigh was being touted as a future Conservative or Unionist MP. In May 1922 he was slipped, unopposed, into the previously Conservative seat of Clapham. The The Pall Mall Gazette reported his victory, commenting that: "Sir John is reputed to be one of the wealthiest men in the country. He has not hesitated to use the position that wealth has given him for the benefit of his fellows." It seems that Sir John owned the Pall Mall Gazette. It was the same newspaper that mentioned the vicar, Robbie Abney Giles, in laudatory terms when he resigned his position as organising secretary of the London Diocesan Fund.

Relief map of Victoria to illustrate the career of Rev R A Giles in Australia.

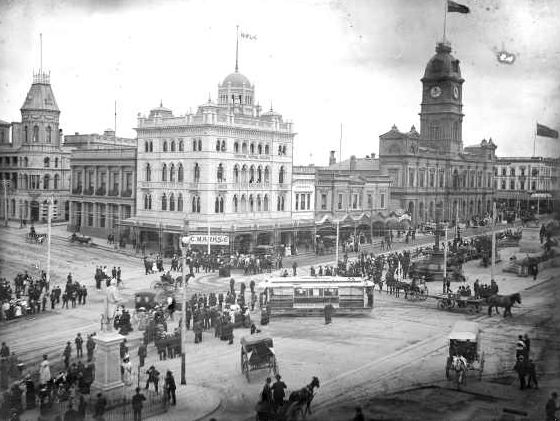
Central Ballarat at the turn of the century. Formerly a tough boomtown and a centre of rebellion, Ballarat was by this time a cathedral city.

Local press reports had all emphasised that Giles was Australian and that his work immediately before his induction to Sheriffhales was basically organisational and business-oriented, not pastoral. However, he had been in parish work for some time before the war, albeit in the very different and very varied landscape of the state of Victoria, in Australia.

Robbie Abney Giles was born at Morrisons, Victoria, a very small settlement, near Ballarat and about 99 km (62 miles) to the west of Melbourne, on 29 April 1886. He was the son of Eliza Ann (née Darling) and Thomas Henry Giles and was registered under the name Robert Abney Giles. He was educated for the clergy from 1907 at St Aidan's Theological College, Ballarat, founded only four years before his admission by Bishop Arthur Green, and specifically intended to train clergy for the Australian branch of the Church of England. Giles was ordained deacon in 1909 and then served as curate in two parishes in Victoria: for a year in the small coastal town of Warrnambool, and a further two years at Ouyen, a settlement scattered along the railway line in the north-west of the state. In 1911, while still a deacon he married Maude Lilian McConaghy: his name is rendered as 'Nobbie' in the record. A Maude L NcConaghy, about the same age as Giles, was recorded by the England and Wales Census as living in Streatham in 1891 and Battersea in 1901 with her mother and brother. Maude was a Londoner, born in Gunnersbury, but her widowed mother was originally from County Donegal. Giles was ordained priest in 1912. From 1913−1916 he was priest-in-charge at Dunkeld, a small town in the south-west of Victoria, then a centre for wool and timber production. In 1913 he was listed by the Victoria Government Gazette as minister of religion authorised to celebrate marriages and his name was rendered as 'Robbie'. Also in 1913 came the birth of the couple's first son, Foster Abney Giles. Finally, Giles was vicar of Sunbury 1916—1919. Sunbury was less than 40 km from Melbourne, the capital of Victoria and, at that time, the interim capital of Australia as a whole.

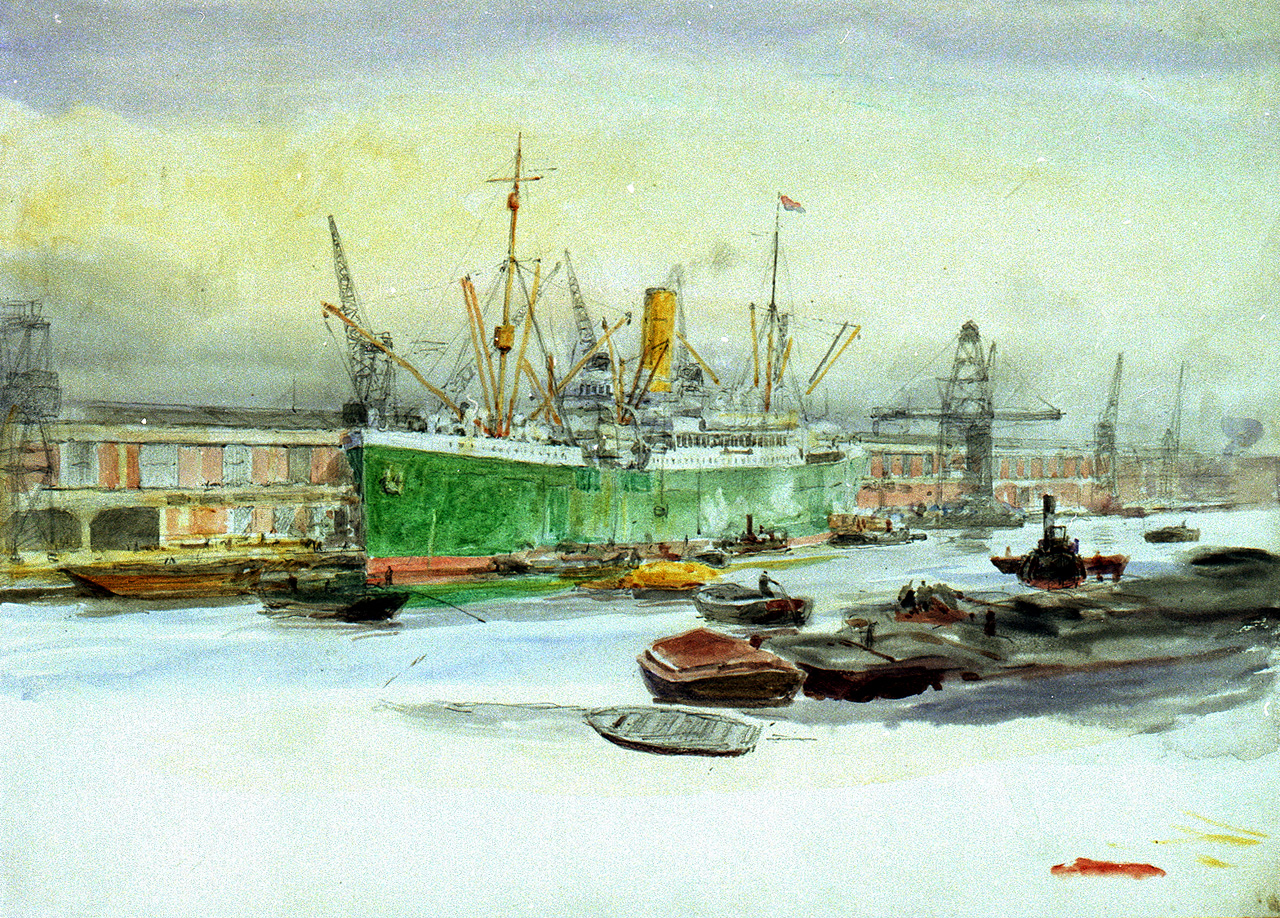
The Euripides, used as a troopship by the Australian army in World War I, docked in London. Painting by William Lionel Wyllie c. 1920.

However, Giles did not serve at Sunbury for long. In 1917 he volunteered for the Australian Army Chaplains' Department and on 1 May 1918 embarked on the HMAT Euripides to join the First Australian Imperial Force in Europe. He was gassed twice during his service in France. After the war he was able to further his theological education at Keble College, Oxford, founded in 1870 as a memorial to John Keble, a leading figure in the Anglo-Catholic Oxford Movement, and intended to open up an Anglican higher education to men of relatively limited means. Over the years 1919—1920 he both studied for and attained a BA (2nd Class, Theology) at Keble but also worked as organising secretary for the SPG, the High Church missionary society, throughout the Diocese of Oxford. His MA followed in 1925.

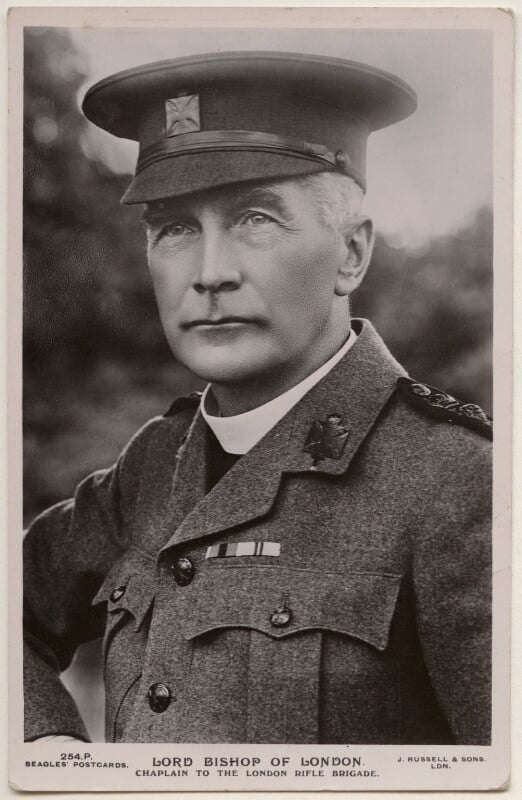
Arthur Foley Winnington Ingram, Bishop of London, pictured in 1914. James Russell & Sons, published by J. Beagles & Co, postcard print, 1914. NPG x197665 © National Portrait Gallery, London. Ingram was notorious for his anti-German rhetoric, and was criticized by Herbert Asquith for "jingoism of the shallowest kind."

Giles now took employment as organising secretary with the London Diocesan Fund, the organisation that looked after the finances of the Church of England in the capital. This meant working as the managerial deputy of the Bishop of London, Arthur Winnington-Ingram. The bishop was a fellow Keble graduate, an Anglo-Catholic with marked militaristic tendencies. Giles did not finally leave the post until some months after his presentation to Sheriffhales. At his formal resignation he was warmly commended by Winnington-Ingram and praised by Lord Justice John Eldon Bankes, the president of the LDF's Council, "who said that if the people of London did not know what the London Diocesan Fund was it was not the fault of Mr. Giles, who had put great energy and enterprise into his work." The Pall Mall Gazette report on the event finished by remarking that Giles "is to enjoy his first hunting season in England in Shropshire."

On 30 September 1922 Giles was instituted in St Mary's Church, Sheriffhales, by the Bishop of Lichfield, John Kempthorne, and then inducted by William Manning Salt, the Rector of Newport. He quickly established himself in the local government institutions, returned unopposed to his predecessor Michell's seats on the Shifnal District Council and Board of Guardians in December 1922.

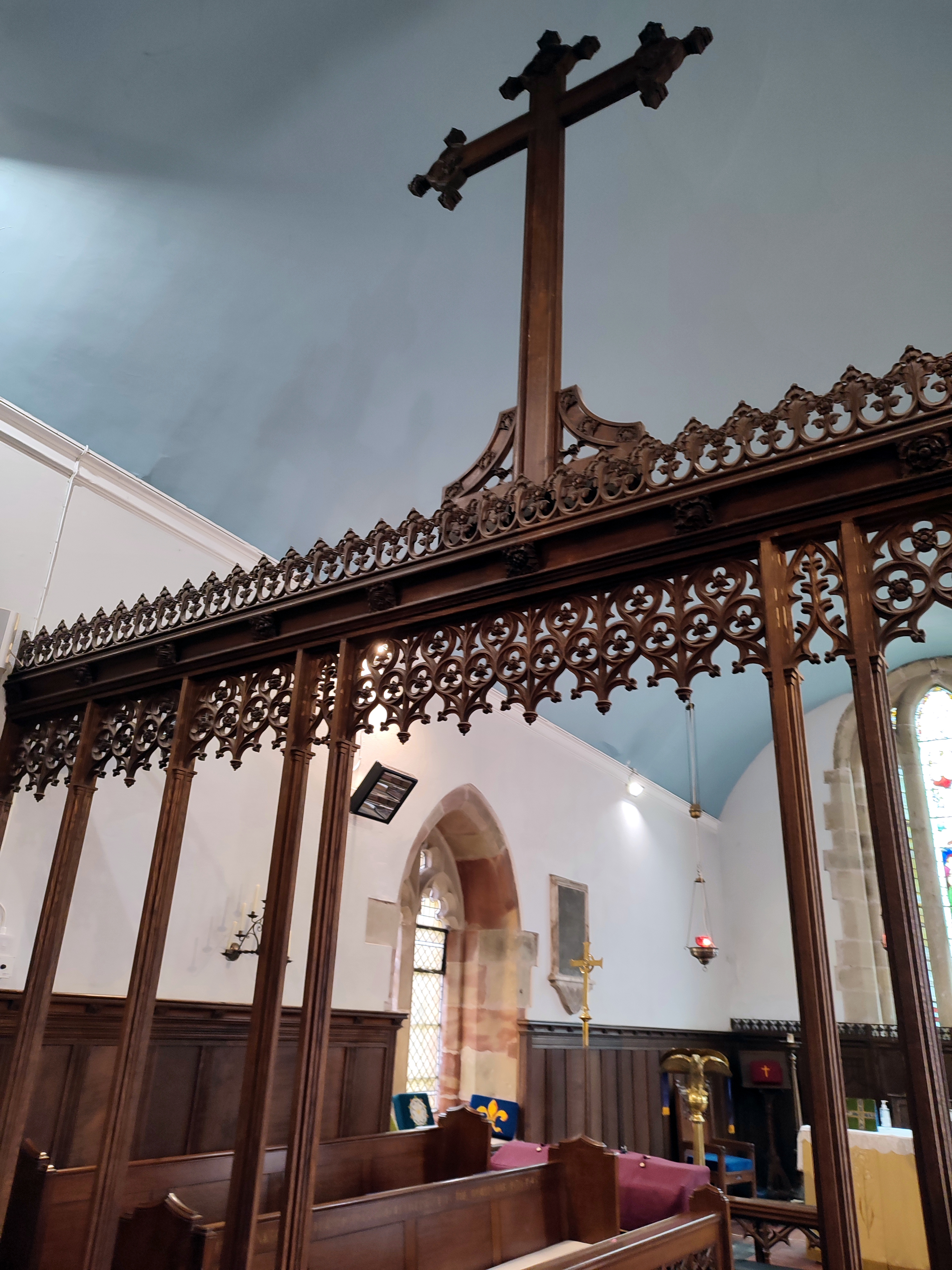
The partial rood screen or chancel screen in St Mary's Church, Sheriffhales, which marks the boundary between nave and chancel. It was installed in 1923.

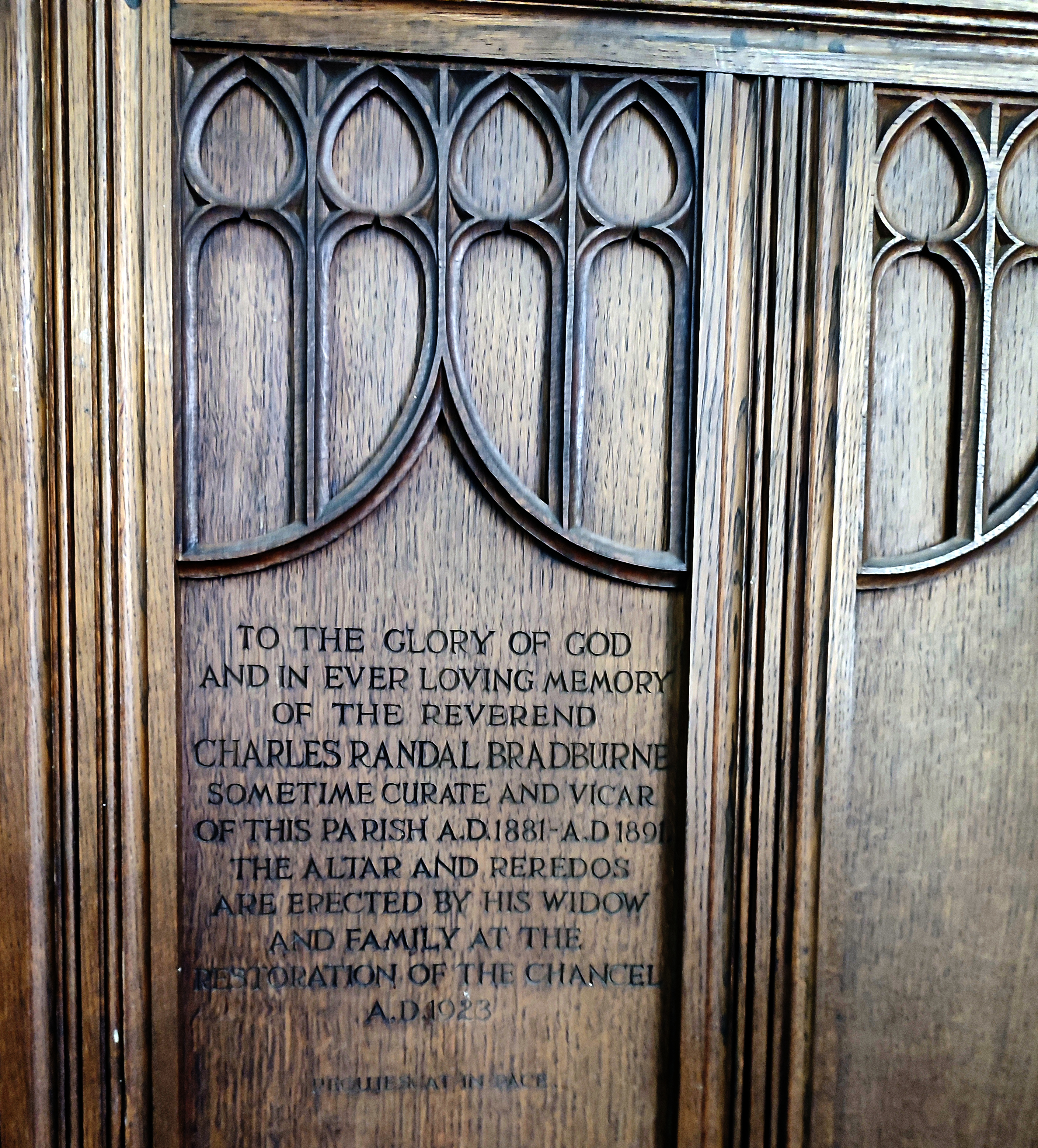
Dedication to Charles Randal Bradburne, vicar of St Mary's Church, Sheriffhales, on the reredos, installed in 1923. The date for his institution is incorrect: he was vicar from late 1879.

Giles made a considerable impact as a preacher on Industrial Sunday 1923, which was instigated by the Shrewsbury Trades and Labour Council as a special service in St Mary's Church, Shrewsbury on 28 April, the closest Sunday to May Day. He advocated equal opportunities and a sense of mutual obligation on both sides of industry. The local press, especially the Shrewsbury Chronicle, gave an unusually full account of the sermon and Giles was regularly called on to be guest preacher at public events in the locality.

During 1923 a partial restoration was carried out on St Mary's church building, focused on the chancel. The most obvious evidence of this work is the partial rood screen or chancel screen, which is today one of the dominant features of the church interior. The reredos and altar were provided by the family of the former vicar Charles Randal Bradburne, whose wife Sarah still lived in Sheriffhales. In order to raise funds to pay for the restoration, Giles mounted an exhibition, gave a lecture and showed films on the subject of Australia at the Picture House in Newport in November of that year. Various other fundraising ventures followed. A gala night in 1924 took place to mark the completion of the "Popular Girl Competition". The winner, Miss Mary Belcher, was presented with a wrist watch: she and her team had contributed £122 of the total £404 (equivalent to £21,236 in 2025) raised. Although these were impressive sums for the time, a considerable debt persisted.

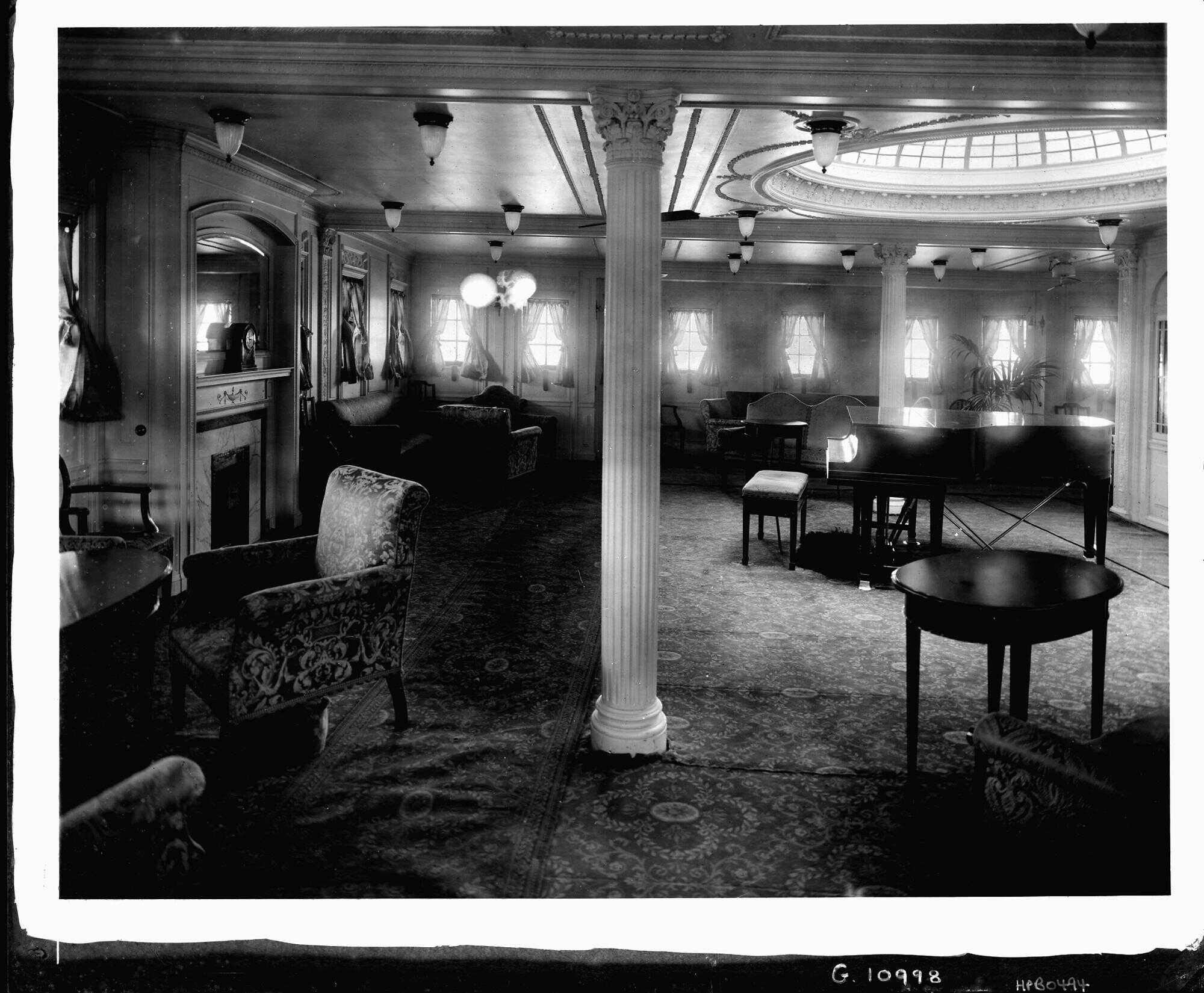
First Class music room on RMS Niagara

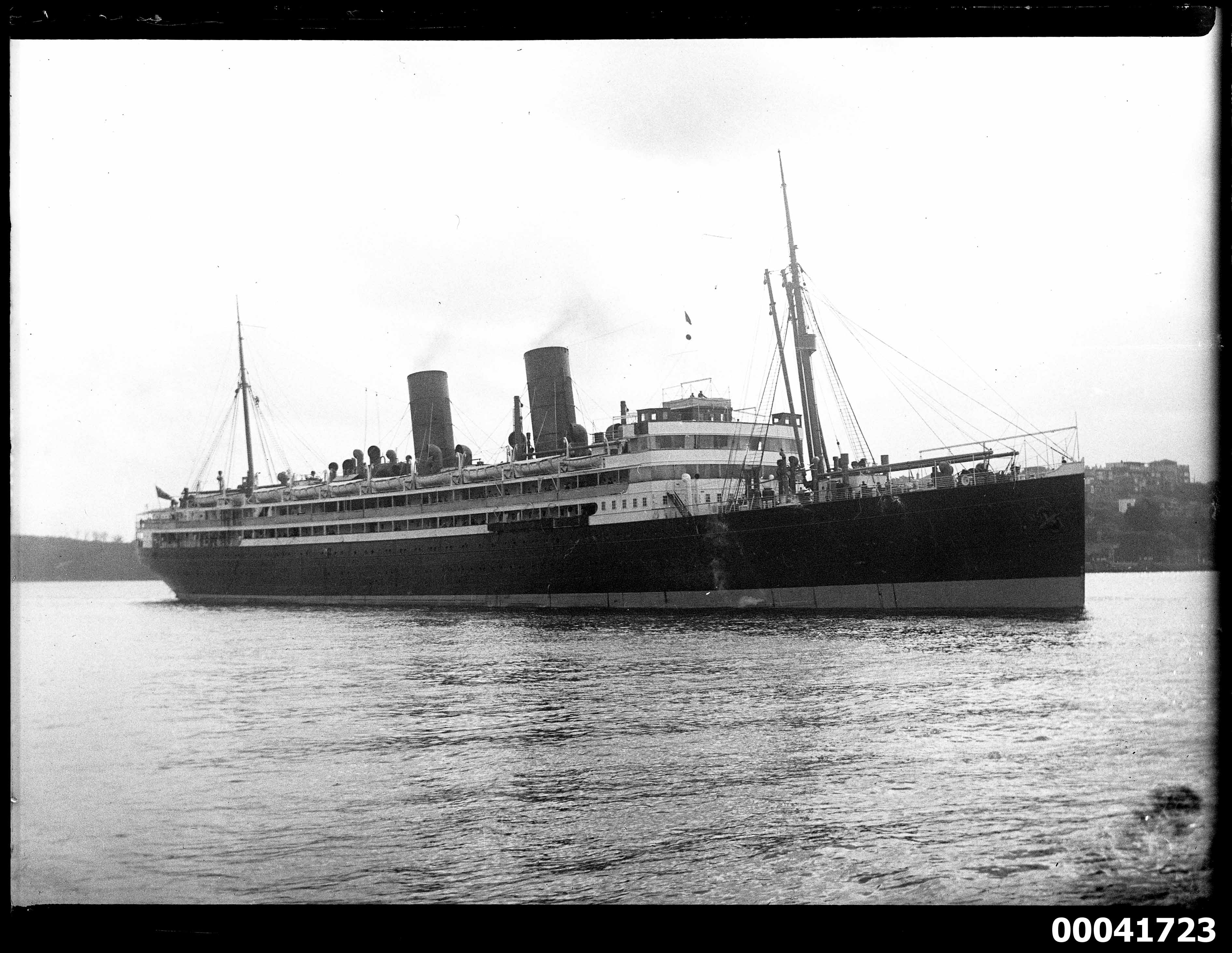
The Nigara leaving Sydney for Vancouver in August 1924.

Giles spent a large part of 1925 on a world tour that took in Australia and the United States. He left Sydney on the homecoming leg on 4 June, in a first-class berth on the RMS Niagara, a particularly luxurious ship belonging to the Union Company. Maude, his wife was not with him: she was recorded as being the relative he would rejoin at Sheriffhales. He arrived at Honolulu, on time, on 19 June, and proceeded to Seattle. On 26 July he gave a sermon on behalf of the World Alliance for International Friendship Through the Churches, a precursor of the World Council of Churches, at Trinity Church, New York. He explained the message of the Alliance as being "that there are methods for settling international disputes and world unrest other than with battalions of infantry and legions of cavalry and colossal artillery." However he denied that it was pacifist. He welcomed the U.S. Fleet's visit to Australia as a sign of friendship between the two nations and spoke warmly of the League of Nations. He concluded with an appeal for donations to St Mary's Church, Sheriffhales:

He said the repairs had cost £4,000, of which £1,200 remained to be paid. Due to the heavy taxation and unemployment in England, he said his own people were unable to meet this, and that he would be happy if he could take home that amount. He explained that he was making this appeal without the knowledge of his church officials, and asked that all contributions be sent to the University Club, where he will have headquarters until he sails on Aug. 26.

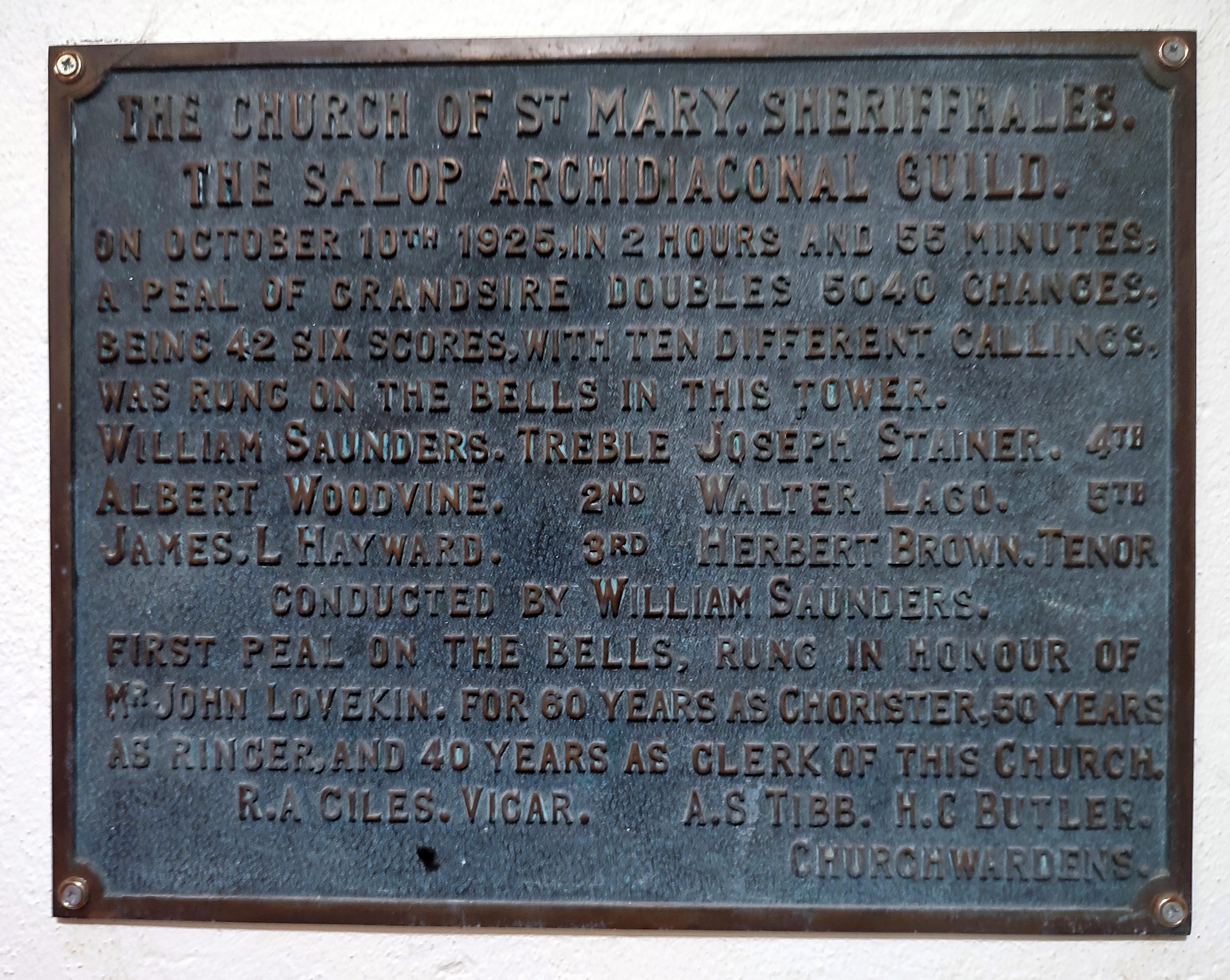
Plaque to commemorate a bell-ringing event, 1925, at St Mary's Church, Sheriffhales, Shropshire. This was the first church event attended by Giles after his world tour.

Giles was welcomed home in October, as part of a parish event celebrating the church bells, and particularly the long career of John Lovekin as chorister, bell ringer and parish clerk.

Giles had lost his local council post as a result of his world tour. By April 1927 he was leading a ratepayers' protest, chairing a large meeting in the church hall. Later in the same month, at a meeting of the parish council,the chairman, Mr Rudolph of Manor Farm expressed concern that he, although a trustee, had no information about the operation of the parish charities and letters from the county council about the matter had received no reply from the vicar. By the autumn of 1927, however, Giles was back in Australia. On 5 October, an interview with him appeared in The West Australian under the headline: Prayer Book Controversy, An Outspoken Clergyman. In his observations on the proposed new Church of England Prayer Book, Giles opined that opposition from Evangelicals might stall it its passage through Parliament and "thought that if either of the Houses did not pass the measure it would be the first step towards the dis-establishment of the Church." However, the main purpose of his visit also figured largely in the interview. He was in Australia to promote his new book, The Constitutional History of the Australian Church, which he intended to present to the Australian bishops. The newspaper slightly mangled the title but named the supervisor of the work as Claude Jenkins, Professor of Ecclesiastical History at Oxford and a famous bibliophile. The book was published in Britain in 1929, with a dedication to Henry Lowther Clarke, the first Archbishop of Melbourne, who had died in 1926, and a foreword by St Clair Donaldson, the Bishop of Salisbury. Giles was awarded the degree of Bachelor of Letters by Oxford University in that year.

Giles was soon involved in a major local dispute about the future use of Lilleshall Hall. By this time Sir John Leigh had tired of his country seat and sold it to a consortium who were promoting it as a "pleasure resort." The catering company obtained a licence from the Newport magistrates to serve alcohol with meals but this was subject to review by the Salop Compensation Authority in April 1928. The hearing attracted numerous protesting witnesses from the community and police but especially the local clergy, both Anglican and nonconformist. The company's lawyer questioned Giles, who admitted he was not a teetotaller. On close questioning, it emerged that he had acted informally as Leigh's agent while he was the owner. He was accused of previously telling the new owners that a drinks licence would be necessary and of offering his support: he denied both allegations. The licence went ahead.

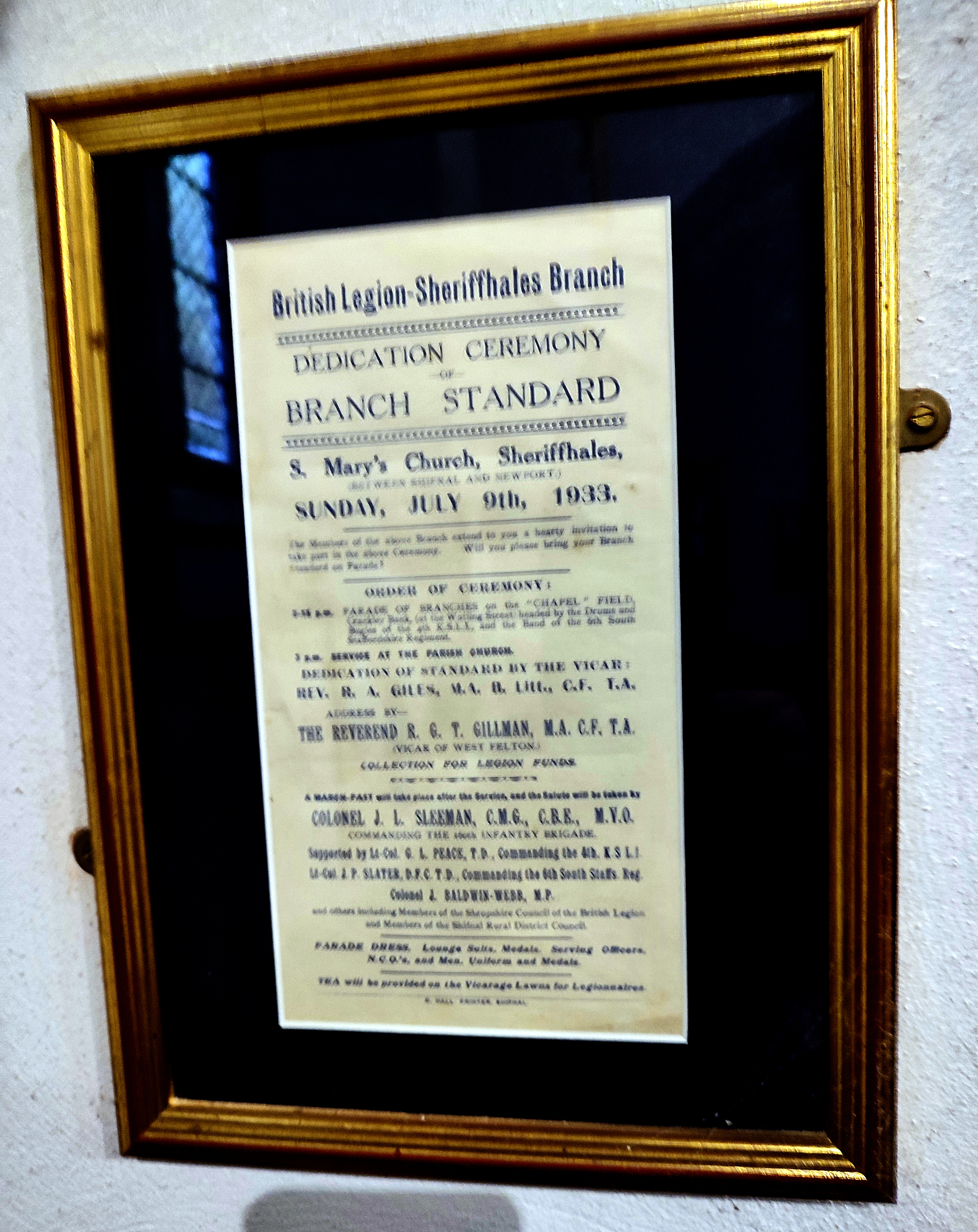
Programme for British Legion service, 1933, at which the British Legion standard was installed in St Mary's Church.

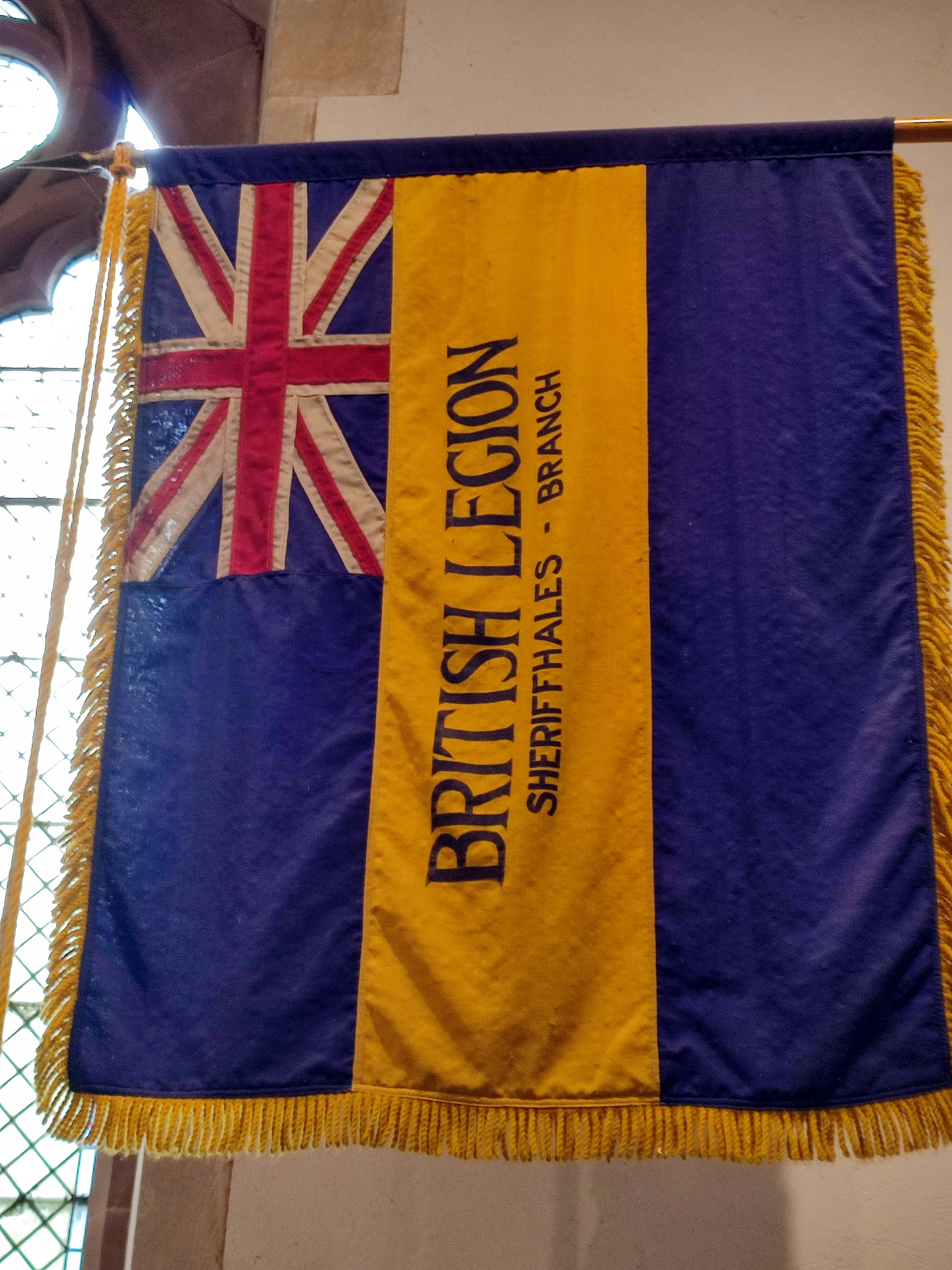
British Legion standard, hung in St Mary's Church, Sheriffhales, 1933.

Giles continued to publicise the Australian Church, hosting a visit to Sheriffhales by Melville James, the Bishop of St Arnaud, Victoria. Another important preoccupation was his links with the military. A surviving reminder is the standard of the Sheriffhales branch of the British Legion, which was dedicated by Giles at a special service in 1933. The main army unit represented was the 4th King's Shropshire Light Infantry, of which Giles was chaplain.

These activities were part of a wider concern with local and national politics, in which Giles seems to have taken an increasing interest as the international situation deteriorated markedly. He sounded a warning note about the atmosphere resembling 1914 at the 1933 Remembrance Sunday service in Oswestry. He spoke in favour of the League of Nations, while recognising that Japan and Germany had now left it, and he laid a wreath in his role as Major for the British Legion. He had rejoined the Shifnal Rural Council and was now Chairman of it: in 1934 he stood for the Shropshire County Council on a program of economy. He was successful and was also re-elected chairman of Shifnal Rural Council, as well as serving as a member of the Wenlock Guardians Committee, which administered the Poor Law. In May 1934 Giles was presented to George V by Douglas Hogg, 1st Viscount Hailsham, the Secretary of State for War and Ernest Thorold, Chaplain General to the armed forces.

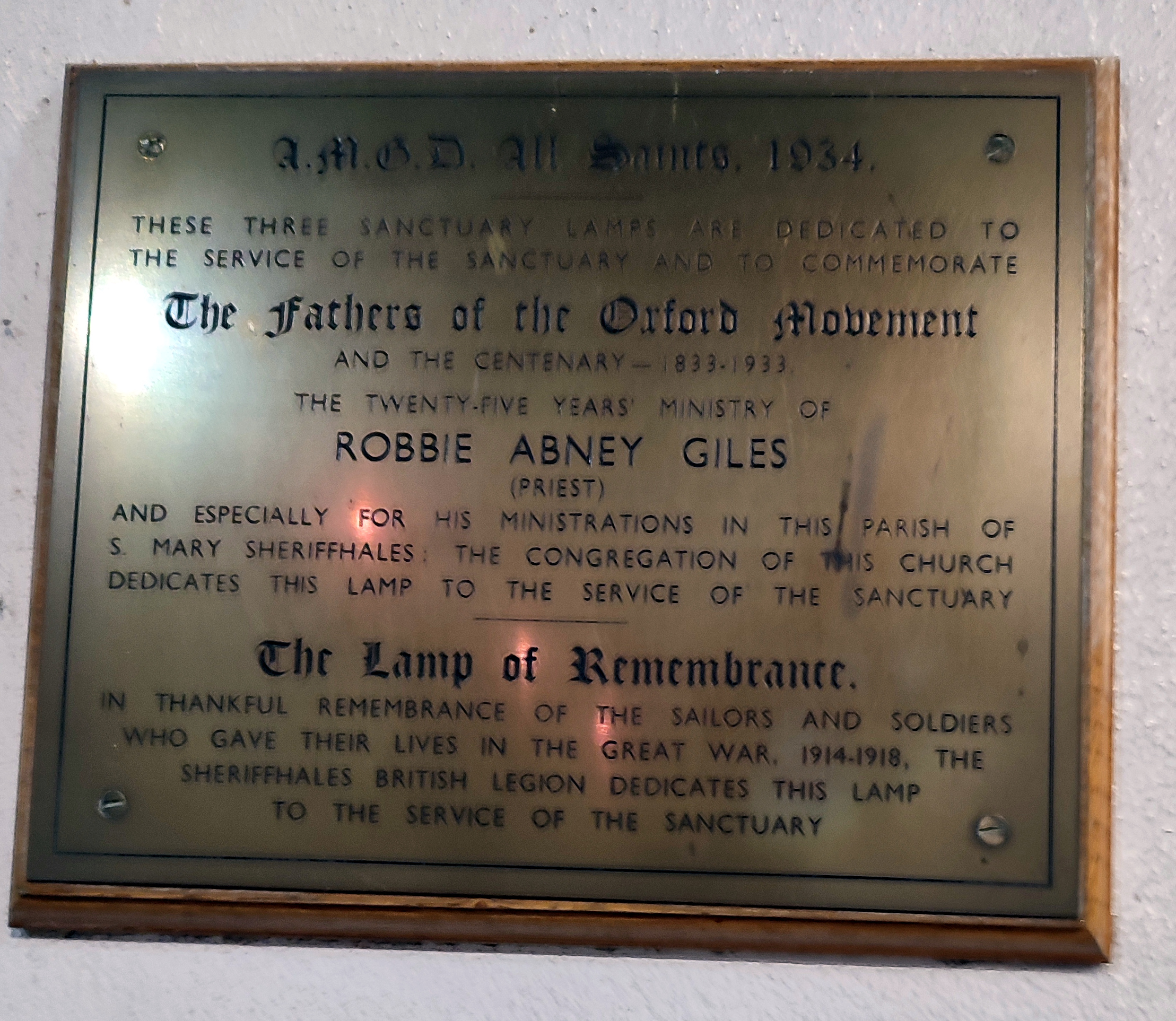
Plaque explaining three oil lights installed in St Mary's Church, Sheriffhales, Shropshire, in 1934.

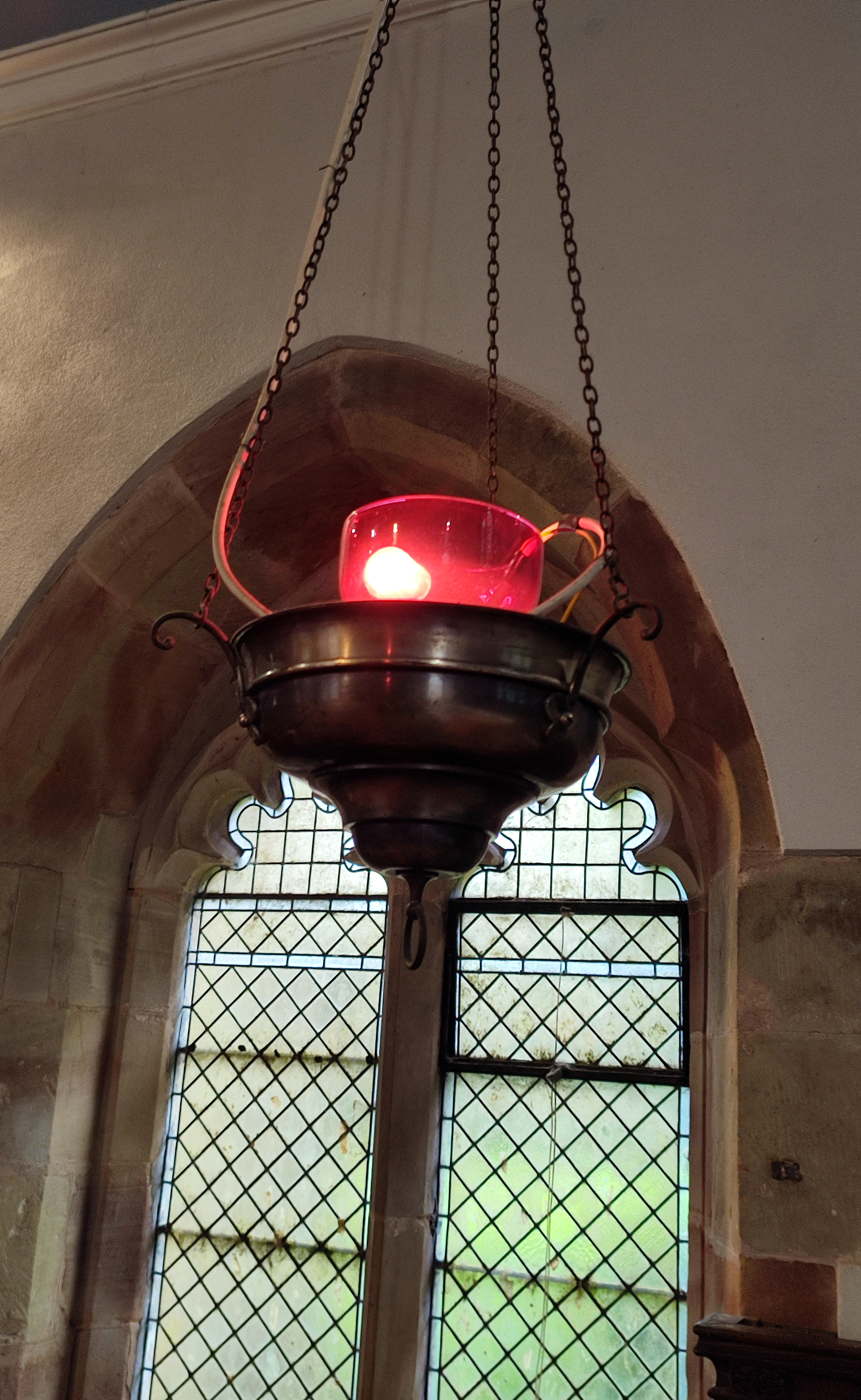
Chancel lamp at St Mary's Church, Sheriffhales, Shropshire. One of three oil lamps, later electrified, installed under the Anglo-Catholic vicar, Robbie Abney Giles, 1934.

It was during 1934 that three oil lamps, since electrified, were hung in the chancel at St Mary's Church. One, donated by the local British Legion, was lowered during that year's Remembrance service. Another was installed by Giles to commemorate the centenary of the Oxford Movement, which he perhaps assumed to have begun with the publication of the first Tracts for the Times in 1833. A third lamp commemorated 25 years of the ministry of Giles himself, which would have counted from his ordination as deacon in 1908.

Up to Britain's entry into World War II in 1939, Giles was constantly occupied in events involving either the veterans of the British Legion or the serving soldiers of the King's Shropshire Light Infantry. Every year around 6 June he conducted or preached at a commemoration in The Quarry at Shrewsbury of KSLI's participation in the Battle of Bligny, Marne, resisting the final German offensive of World War I. Probably the apex of this particular preoccupation was his orchestration in April 1935 of the entry of the 2nd KSLI into Shropshire on a route march. Although he was chaplain to a different battalion, he took the salute and addressed the troops in uniform. Giles was also well-known for his support of the Albrighton Hunt, attending major public events like the annual Hunt Ball, as well as riding with it regularly.

Giles made a very controversial statement in an outburst from the pulpit of St Mary's, Sheriffhales, during the parliamentary process that led to the Tithe Act 1936. After a steady erosion of incomes from tithes, the Act, said Giles proposed to remove a further £343,160 annually from the clergy, amounting on a 3% basis to the equivalent of a capital expropriation of £11,500,000. He estimated this was the equivalent of a £2,466 capital gain to tithe-payers in Sheriffhales, whom he identified with big landowners, rather than tenant farmers. He claimed that he knew no farmers who wanted to reduce clergy incomes. However, the most controversial point of his sermon was his vow to work for the disestablishment of the Church of England, despite what he characterised as his lifelong commitment to the establishment. In fact, Giles had at least mooted the idea almost a decade earlier in response to the Prayer Book controversy, but in an Australian newspaper.

Later in 1936 Giles also came under pressure in his political activities when a large protest meeting at Sheriffhales denounced the local water rates, levied by Shifnal Rural Council, which were based on a minimum charge of 17s 6d, covering 10,000 gallons per quarter, perceived by parishioners as both regressive and conducive to waste. Giles arrived for the meeting late and felt unable to promise anything on behalf of the council, although he was the chairman.

In 1938, with war appearing imminent, Giles began to read a collect for peace to open council meetings. On 15 December 1941, only a week into the Malayan campaign, Captain Foster Abney Giles, the eldest son of Robbie and Maude, was posted missing. His death was not confirmed until September 1942. Giles himself was in charge of Civil Defence in the area. He played his part in Farm Sunday, a celebration of wartime agriculture. Towards the end of hostilities the diocese decided to wait for peace before instituting a new vicar at Tong: Giles deputised at Tong, holding a morning communion service there for nine months.

Not until 1946 was there a tentative return to controversy, with Giles widely reported as remarking that "the church has great difficulty in competing with the cinema and the 'local.'" The following year a plan to reorganise education in the county, involving the closure of 71 Church schools, led Giles to proclaim: "I am ashamed of the bishops of the church." He predicted the end of village life. However, in September the Bishop of Shrewsbury, Robert Hodson, visited Sheriffhales to address a silver anniversary event for Giles at St Mary's, Sheriffhales, marking his 25 years as vicar. Within days he made the national press, angrily denouncing the county council's expenditure of £500 on musical instruments for pupils, and puzzlingly concluding: “It's unfortunate that children in these ‘Gestapo’ days will not have the opportunity of singing ‘Land of Hope and Glory' and ‘Britons Never Shall Be Slaves.”.

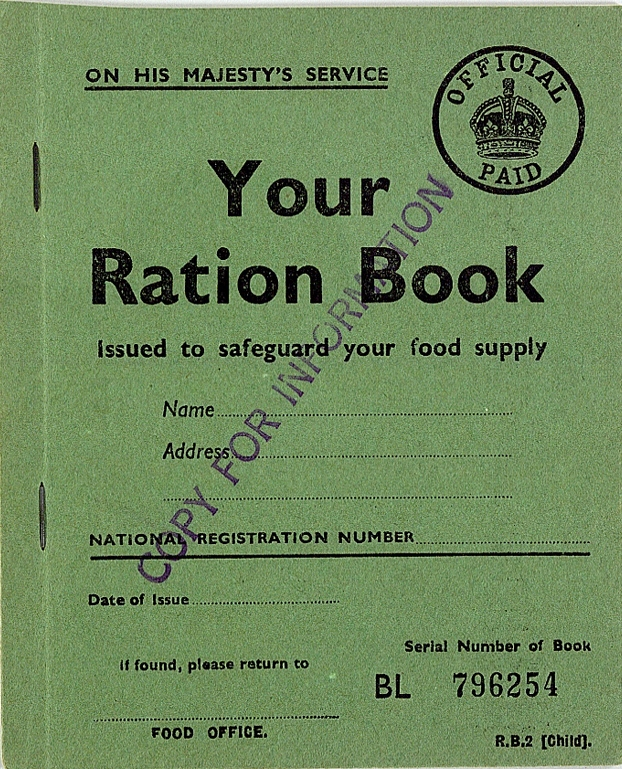
A child's ration book, used during the Second World War. Rationing continued after the war ended under the Labour government under Clement Attlee. Despite Conservative agitation against it, the succeeding Conservative government under Winston Churchill was unable to end rationing completely until 1954.

It is likely that Giles was hinting at an investigation into his own financial affairs that must already have been undermining his position. A week after his outburst on music in schools, he and four received a summons from the Treasury Solicitor. The others were Ruth Irene Young, who ran a guest house in Sheriffhales, John William Bennett of Heath Hill, George Thomas, a food executive officer and clerk to Shifnal Council, and John Moore of the Crown Hotel at Albrighton. All were to appear at Wellington magistrate's court on 5 November. The hearing lasted all day. The following day's Birmingham Daily Gazette gave a summary of the hearing on its front page, designed to suggest, but not quite state, a salacious angle. Young and Giles were accused of using eggs produced on the vicarage premises within the business: this was illegal because rationing rules required eggs produced by commercial units of more than 25 birds to be sent to the approved packing stations to become part of the stock distributed to ration card holders. Giles tried to cast the blame on Young, saying that he used the guest house only for a study, as well as board and lodging. The Food Ministry's lawyer accused Giles of "trying to hide behind the skirts" of the housekeeper. Harold Rowbottom, the Ministry accountant admitted that he had told Giles he was "unfit to wear the Cross" but claimed Giles had sworn and used foul language, "waving his arms about like a lunatic." He denied he had briefed the press in advance or told people what a "dirty dog" Giles was. The local Shrewsbury Chronicle had a more detailed account which began by first pointing out that Giles and Young had actually had more serious conspiracy charges dismissed, including charges related to obtaining animal feed illegally. The court did, however, find it impossible to distinguish between the roles of Giles and Young, as the profits from the guest house went through the vicar's tax returns. Bennett was accused of giving them coupons, intended for the local pig club, which they actually used to obtain chicken feed. He was cleared of a conspiracy charge, but both Moore and Thomas had their conspiracy trials adjourned until 17 December, with Giles and Young's trials on the poultry issue to be decided on that date.

However, when the magistrates convened on 17 December for the trial of Moore and Thomas, they were unable to set a date for the trial of Giles and Young, as they were informed that an application was to be made to a judge in chambers to reinstate the conspiracy charges against them and Bennett. At the January sessions, all five of the original defendants were sent for trial to the next Assizes on conspiracy indictments. At Shrewsbury Assizes in February Young was fined £40 and Giles £30, with the fines appearing in a short paragraph in the London Evening News, headed simply Guest House Widow. The judge was Reginald Croom-Johnson, a former Conservative MP, who described his own sentencing as lenient, and called the offences "somewhat technical," hoping that nobody would think Giles unfit for the offices he held.

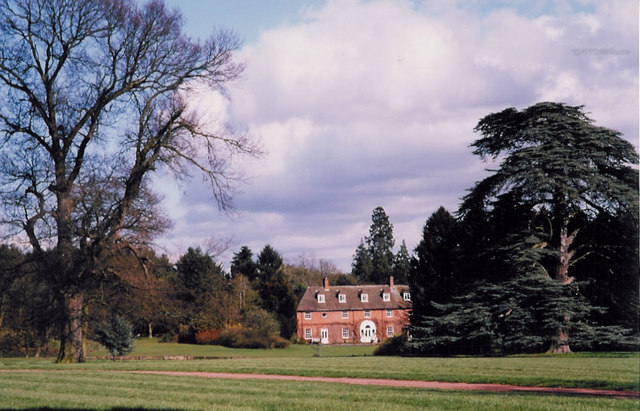
Badger Hall site today. The hall itself was demolished in 1953. The visible building is a former gatehouse.

Giles was able to return to his former responsibilities without much difficulty, except for the chair of Shifnal Rural Council, which he had resigned early in the egg affair. Press coverage for a time focused mainly on his conduct of funerals. When Stanley Roberts, who lived at the Crown Hotel in Albrighton, died in February 1949, his funeral was attended mainly by Freemasons and it was conducted Giles, who was described as "an old Masonic friend." He was returned unopposed as Albrighton's representative on Shropshire County Council and in 1950 he was elected Alderman.

He then applied to the Shifnal Rural Council for leave to take a holiday of more than six months in Australia. True to his word, he returned in January 1951, denouncing Australia's housing as "done by the State, and like everything else the State touches, it is made a mess of." He cautioned families against emigration to Australia. Even after the return of a Conservative government he was against almost any form of expenditure, loudly opposing a government plan to conserve Badger Hall at a cost of up to £20,000. In this case most locals agreed with him and a year later it was demolished.

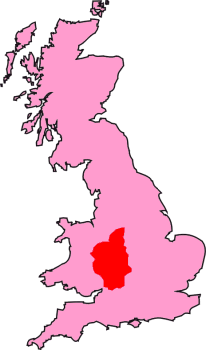
The area covered by MEB within Great Britain

Memorial plaques to Robbie Abney Giles, Vicar of Sheriffhales, 1922-1962, and his two sons, Foster and Brian. South wall of chancel, St Mary's Church, Sheriffhales.

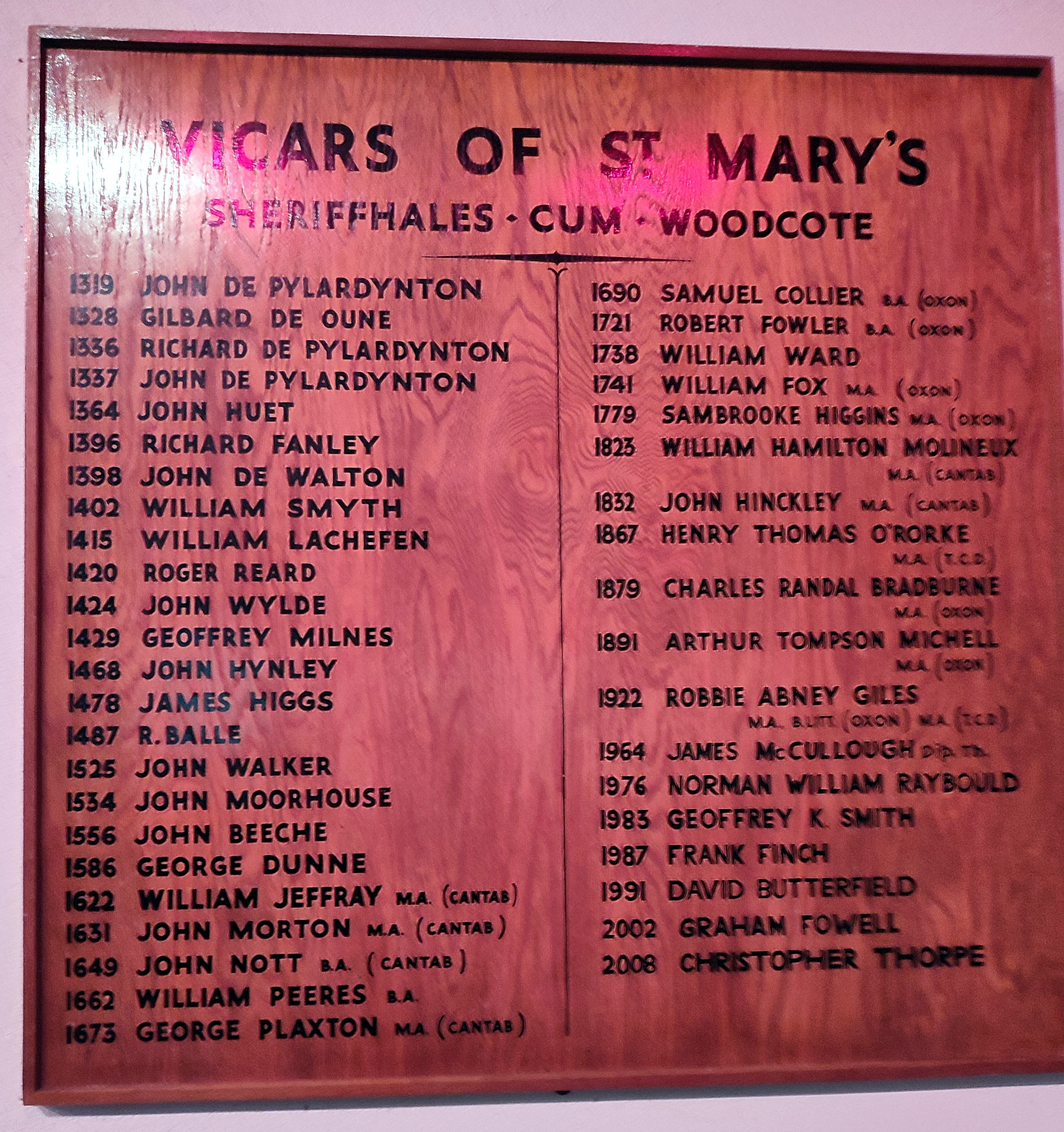
Board in St Mary's Church, Sheriffhales, listing known vicars.

After operations at a hospital in Wolverhampton during autumn of 1952, Giles seems to have been quiet for a while, before returning to his criticism of what he regarded as waste by the local utilities. In December 1953 his target was the installation of a chlorinating plant to maintain water hygiene by the East Salop Water Board, which he called "Whitehall nonsense." In July 1955 he was appointed Chairman of the Midland Electricity Consultative Council, on a salary of £750 per annum. Despite his loudly-proclaimed opposition to state enterprise, this made him ex officio a member of the Midland Electricity Board, the regional arm of the nationalised electricity industry. The Sunday Express reported that the appointment was highly divisive within Sheriffhales parish: "one of the biggest arguments in Sheriffhales-cum-Woodcote history." Many considered the post a distraction and it laid Giles open to the charge that his post was itself a waste of public money. Two years later all MEB part-time officials received a 100% pay rise. Giles now earned £1500 (equivalent to £31,417 in 2025) as chairman of the Consultative Council and received an individual mention in regional coverage of the increases.

Robbie Abney Giles resigned from his vicarage of Sheriffhales in 1962, after 40 years in the post, and continued to live in the village at Glebe Cottage. He continued as a member of Shifnal Council until 1963 and as an alderman at Shropshire County Council until 1965. He died on 5 January and was cremated privately two days later.

==== Recent vicars ====
The Shropshire advowsons held by Leigh were sold to Henry Bryant Rudolph of Manor Farm, Sheriffhales, during the 1920s. Rudolph was a Manchester corn merchant who had a home at Moss House, Styal. Unlike Leigh, he played an active part in local life in and around Sheriffhales. However, his wife Amelia and his son, William Rudolph, of Crackley Bank, a local councillor, were both killed in a car accident in January 1939, ironically on their way to a family funeral in Wilmslow. The advowsons of both Sheriffhales and Lilleshall were notified as transferred to the Bishop of Lichfield on 15 August 1945

After 1984 Sheriffhales was combined with neighbouring parishes, initially sharing a vicar with Lilleshall. From 2002, however, it shared with Shifnal. Under the last vicar, Chris Thorpe, Tong was added to form the Benefice of Shifnal, Sheriffhales and Tong.

| Date of Institution | Name | Education | Deacon | Priest | Previous Posts |
|---|---|---|---|---|---|
| 1964 | James McCullough | Wycliffe Hall, Oxford 1941—1942. | 1941 | 1942 | Curate at St Michael the Archangel, Bristol 1942—1944; St Bartholomew, Penn 1944—1948. Vicar of St Gabriel, Fulbrook, Walsall 1948—1954. Rector of Hinstock, 1954—1959; Wrockwardine Wood 1959—1964. |
| 1976 | Norman William Raybould | Lichfield Theological College, 1951—1954. | 1954 | 1955 | Curate of All Saints' Church, Bloxwich 1954—1957; Church of the Good Shepherd, Castlecroft, in Tettenhall Wood parish 1957—1960. In charge of St Paul, Mount Pleasant, Stoke-on-Trent ST4 4PP 1960–1961. Priest in charge of St Luke, Hanley ST1 3PX 1961—1967. Vicar of St Martin's, Shropshire, near Oswestry 1967—1976. |
| 1983 | Geoffrey Keith Smith | London College of Divinity 1957—1960. | 1960 | 1961 | Curate of St Luke, Leek 1960—1963; Trentham 1963—1966. Vicar of Lilleshall, 1966—83. Priest in charge Sheriffhales and Woodcote 1983—1984. Vicar Lilleshall and Sheriffhales 1984—1987 |
| 1987 | Frank Finch | Queen's College, Birmingham (now The Queen's Foundation) 1972—1974. | 1974 | 1975 | Curate St Leonard, Bilston 1974—1978. Rector Sudbury and Somersal Herbert 1978—1987. Chaplain HM Prison Sudbury 1978—1987; HM detention Centre, Foston Hall 1980—1987. Vicar Lilleshall and Sheriffhales 1987—1991. |
| 1991 | David John Butterfield | London University BMus 1973. St John's College, Nottingham, DipTh 1975. | 1977 | 1978 | Curate Christ Church, Southport 1977—1981. Minister St Thomas, Aldridge 1981—1991. Vicar Lilleshall and Sheriffhales 1991—2002 |
| 2002 | Graham Charles Fowell | University of Southampton BTh 1985. Chichester Theological College. | 1982 | 1983 | Curate Clayton 1982—1986; Uttoxeter with Bramshall 1986—1990. Vicar Oxley 1990—1995. Priest in charge Shifnal 1995-2002. |
| 2008 | Christopher David Charles Thorpe | Coventry Polytechnic BA 1983. Ripon College Cuddesdon 1985 | 1988 | 1989 | Curate St Alban, Norton 1988—1992. Team Vicar Blakenall Heath 1992—1999. Team Rector Bilston 1999-2008. Vicar Shifnal and Sheriffhales 2008-2026. Subsequently Vicar of the Benefice of Shinal, Sheriffhales and Tong. Retired July 2026. |
