= Reid =

Origin
- Region of origin: Scotland

Reid is a surname of Scottish origin. It means "red".

== People with the surname ==
- Alec Cunningham-Reid (1895–1977), British politician
- Alan Reid (disambiguation), multiple people
- Alex Reid (disambiguation), multiple people
- Alexander Reid (disambiguation), multiple people
- Alexandra Reid (born 1989), American singer
- Amanda Reid (born 1996), Australian Paralympic athlete
- Amanda Reid (taxonomist), Australian biologist
- Amy Sanderson née Reid (1876–1931), Scottish suffragette
- Andrew Reid (disambiguation), multiple people
- Andy Reid (disambiguation), multiple people
  - Andy Reid (born 1958), American professional football coach
- Angella Reid, White House Chief Usher
- Anne Cooke Reid (1907–1997), African American stage director and academic
- Anthony Reid (born 1957), British racing driver
- Anthony Reid (academic) (1939–2025), New Zealand-born Australian historian of Southeast Asia
- Antonio Reid (born 1956), American record executive
- Arizona Reid (born 1986), American international basketball player
- Beverly W. Reid (1917–1942), United States Navy officer, pilot, and Navy Cross recipient
- Bevis Reid (1919–1997), British athlete
- Billy Reid (disambiguation), multiple people
- Brandon Reid (born 1981), ice hockey player for the Vancouver Canucks
- Bruce Reid (disambiguation), multiple people
  - Bruce Reid (born 1963), Australian cricketer
- Buddy Reid (born 1940), Sri Lankan cricketer
- Cameron Reid (born 2007), Canadian ice hockey player
- Carl Reid (born 1950), Canadian Roman Catholic priest
- Carl Benton Reid (1893–1973), American actor
- Carolyn Reid (born 1972), English field hockey goalkeeper
- Carolynn Reid-Wallace (born 1942), American academic administrator
- Catherine Reid, New Zealand paleontologist
- Chantelle Reid (born 1998), English boxer
- Charles Reid (disambiguation), multiple people
- Charlie Reid (disambiguation) multiple people
- Charlie and Craig Reid, members of The Proclaimers
- Chase Reid (born 2007), American ice hockey player
- Chris Reid (born 1971), Scottish footballer
- Christopher Reid (born 1949), British poet, essayist and writer
- Christopher Reid (entertainer) (born 1964), aka "Kid" Reid, American actor and rapper
- Christopher Reid (swimmer) (born 1996), South African competitor 2016 Olympics
- Clarence Reid (1939–2016), American musician, songwriter, and record producer, also known as Blowfly
- Cliff Reid (1891–1959), American film producer
- Constance Reid (1918–2010), mathematical author
- Cornelius L. Reid (1911–2008), American voice teacher and writer on singing
- Dallas Reid (born 1993), American voice actor
- Daniel G. Reid (1858 – 1925), American industrialist, financier, and philanthropist
- Damion Reid (born 1979), American drummer
- Daphne Reid (born 1948), American actress
- Darren Reid (born 1983), Canadian ice hockey player
- David Reid (disambiguation), multiple people
- Derek Reid (1927–2006), British mycologist
- Desmond Reid (born 2004), American football player
- Don Reid (disambiguation), multiple people
- Douglas Reid (disambiguation), multiple people
- Duke Reid (1915–1975), Jamaican record producer
- Duncan Reid (born 1989), Hong Kong basketball player
- Ebenezer Emmet Reid (1872–1973), American chemistry
- Ed Reid, American author and investigative journalist who exposed organized crime
- Edward Waymouth Reid (1862–1948), British physiologist
- Eliza Reid (born 1976), Canadian-born writer and editor; First Lady of Iceland
- Elliott Reid (1920–2013), American actor
- Ellis Vair Reid (1889–1917), Canadian World War I pilot
- Escott Reid (1905–1999), Canadian public servant and diplomat
- Elizabeth Reid (disambiguation), multiple people
- Fiona Reid (born 1951), Canadian actress
- Forrest Reid (1875–1947), British novelist
- Frances Reid (1914–2010), American daytime television actress
- Francis Reid (1900–1970), British army officer
- Frank Reid (disambiguation), multiple people
- Geordie Reid (1882–1960), Scottish footballer
- George Reid (disambiguation)
  - George Reid (1845–1918), fourth Prime Minister of Australia
- Gordon Reid (disambiguation) multiple people,
- Guy Reid (1897–1917), British World War I flying ace
- Guy Jocelyn Reid (born 1963), British sculptor
- Harry Reid (disambiguation), multiple people
  - Harry Reid (1939–2021), American politician
- Hayden Reid (born 1978), New Zealand pastor and former rugby union player
- Helen Rogers Reid (1882–1970), American publisher
- Henry Reid, UCLA employee involved in human tissue scandal
- Hugo Reid (1809–1852), Scottish-born early California settler
- Iain Reid (born c. 1980), Canadian writer
- Isabel Reid (born 1932), Aboriginal Australian elder and Indigenous rights advocate
- James Reid (disambiguation), multiple people
- Jamie Reid (disambiguation), multiple people
  - Jamie Reid (1947–2023), British artist and anarchist
- Jane Sinclair Reid (1883–1968), Australian educator of blind students
- Janice Reid (born 1947), Australian academic and medical anthropologist
- Jayden Reid (born 2001), English professional footballer
- Jayden Reid (soccer) (born 2001), American soccer player
- Jen Reid, subject of Mark Quinn's sculpture A Surge of Power (Jen Reid) 2020
- Jim Reid (born 1961), musician, lead singer of The Jesus and Mary Chain
- Joani Reid, Scottish politician
- Joanne Reid (born 1992), American biathlete
- John Reid (disambiguation), multiple people
  - John Reid, Baron Reid of Cardowan, British politician
- Joseph L. Reid (1923–2015), American oceanographer
- Joy Reid (born 1968), American television journalist
- Justin Reid (born 1997), American football player
- Karene Reid (born 2000), American football player
- Kerry Reid (born 1947), Australian tennis player
- Laurie Reid (born 1964), American artist
- Lawrence A. Reid, American linguist
- Len Reid (1916–2003), Australian fighter pilot and politician
- Linda Reid (born 1959), Canadian politician
- Lucien Reid (born 1993), British boxer
- Lydia Reid, American politician
- Lydia Reid (activist) (c. 1949–2023), activist for families with children who died as infants
- Mabel Reid (died 1969), American Samoan politician
- Malcolm Reid (1857–1933), timber merchant and furniture retailer in South Australia
- Marcella Althaus-Reid (1952–2009), Argentine educator
- Margaret Reid (disambiguation), multiple people
- Marion Kirkland Reid (1815–1902), Scottish feminist writer
- Marion Reid (1929–2023), Canadian provincial politician
- Marion Reid (scientist), British immunohaematologist
- Matthew Reid (disambiguation), multiple people
- Meta Mayne Reid (1905–1991), British children's writer
- Michael Reid (disambiguation), multiple people
- Mike Reid (disambiguation), multiple people
- Miles Reid (born 1948), mathematician
- Nancy Reid (born 1952), Canadian Theoretical Statististician
- Naz Reid (born 1999), American basketball player
- Neil Reid (disambiguation), multiple people
- Nicholas Reid (disambiguation), multiple people
- Ogden Mills Reid (1882–1947), American publisher
- Ogden Rogers Reid (1925–2019), American diplomat and politician
- Patrick Reid (disambiguation), multiple people
- Peter Reid (born 1956), English football manager
- Pierre Reid (1948–2021), Canadian politician
- Poppy Reid, editor-in-chief of The Music Network
- Rachel Reid (historian) (1876–1952), English historian
- Rachel Reid (author), Canadian novelist
- Rebecca Reid, British actress
- Reuben Reid (born 1988), British football (soccer) player
- Richard Reid (disambiguation), multiple people
  - Richard Reid (born 1973), British jihadist best known as the "shoe bomber"
- Riley Reid (born 1991), American pornographic actress
- Robert Reid (disambiguation), multiple people, including
  - Robert Gillespie Reid (1842–1908), Scottish railway contractor
  - Robert James Reid (born 1993), Filipino-Australian singer-songwriter, actor, dancer, model, record producer and record label executive
  - Robert Reid (painter) (1862–1929), American impressionist painter
  - Robert Threshie Reid, 1st Earl of Loreburn, British Liberal politician
- Ross Reid, multiple people
- Rufus Reid (born 1944), American jazz bassist and educator
- Russell Reid, British psychiatrist
- Ruth Reid (disambiguation), multipcle people
- Sally Reid, Scottish actress
- Samantha Reid (1984–1999), American high school student and manslaughter victim
- Samuel Reid (disambiguation), multiple people
- Scott Reid (disambiguation), multiple people
- Sean Reid-Foley (born 1995), American baseball player
- Sophia Reid-Gantzert (born 2010), Canadian actress and dancer
- Squire Reid (1887–1949), Australian politician
- Stephanie Reid (born 1996), Australian basketball player
- Stefen Reid (born 1972), Canadian football player
- Steven Reid (born 1981), Irish football (soccer) player
- Steven J. Reid, Scottish historian
- Storm Reid (born 2003), US-American actor
- Sue Reid (born 1970), Canadian field hockey player
- Susan Reid, birth name of Hilda Koronel (born 1957), Filipino actress
- Susanna Reid (born 1970), English journalist and television presenter
- Tara Reid (born 1975), American actress
- Tasha Reid (born 1981), Korean rapper
- Terry Reid (1949–2025), English rock vocalist, songwriter, and guitarist
- Terry Reid (rugby union) (1934–2017), Australian rugby union international
- Thomas Reid (disambiguation), multiple people, including
  - T. R. Reid, American journalist and author
  - Thomas Reid (1710–1796), Scottish common-sense philosopher
  - Thomas Mayne Reid (1818–1883), Irish-American novelist
- Tim Reid (disambiguation), multiple people, including
  - Tim Reid (born 1944), American actor and film director
  - Tim Reid (politician) (born 1936) Canadian politician
- Trevor Reid (1908–1965), English actor
- Trevor Reid (gridiron football) (born 2000), American football player
- Vernon Reid (born 1958), guitarist of the band Living Colour
- Victor Stafford Reid (1913–1987), Jamaican writer
- Virginia Reid (1916–1955), first stage name of actress better known as Lynne Carver
- Wallace Reid (1891–1923), silent film actor
- William Reid (disambiguation), multiple people
- Winston Reid (born 1988) New Zealand footballer
- Whitelaw Reid (1837–1912), American diplomat, politician, and journalist
- Whitelaw Reid (journalist) (1913–2009), American journalist and publisher
- Wilfrid Thomas Reid (1887–1968), English aircraft designer and Canadian aviation pioneer

== Fictional characters ==
- Ashleigh Reid, a playable character known as Ash in Apex Legends
- Britt Reid, secret identity of the Green Hornet
- Elliot Reid, a character on the TV show Scrubs
- Emma Reid, a character on the British soap opera Doctors
- F. X. Reid, pseudonym used by a British computer science writer
- Fergus Reid, a character in multiple titles in the Wolfenstein video game series
- John Reid, better known as the Lone Ranger
- Jonathan Reid, a character in the Vampyr video game
- Spencer Reid, a character on the TV show Criminal Minds
  - Diana Reid, his mother
  - William Reid, his father

== See also ==
- Reed (name)
- Reid (given name)
- Reidy
- Riedy
