= Arthur Michell =

England international rugby union player, notable Anglican clergyman and antiquary

Reverend Arthur Tompson Michell MA (Oxon), FSA)
- Born: 16 September 1852; Oxford, UK
- Died: 13 August 1923 (aged 70); Oxford, UK
- Burial place: Wolvercote Cemetery
- Occupation: Parish clergyman
- Years active: 1879–1922
- Spouse: Edith Margaret Fox
- Children: 3
- Parents: Richard Michell (father); Amelia Blair (mother)
- Relatives: Mary Caroline Blair (sister)

Ecclesiastical career
- Religion: Christian
- Church: Church of England
- Ordained: Deacon, 1879; Priest, 1881
- Writings: The Parish Register of Marsham, Norfolk; Rugby School Register (3 volumes); Sheriffhales Parish Register
- Offices held: Curate of Burghclere, Hampshire (1879—1882); Curate of St Laurence's Church, Upton-cum-Chalvey (1882—1885); Rector of Brampton, Norfolk (1885—1891); Vicar of Sheriffhales (1891—1922)
Arthur Michell
- School: Rugby School
- University: Oriel College, Oxford
Rugby union career
- Position: Halfback
International career
Years	Team	Apps	(Points)
1875	England	3	(0)

Arthur Tompson Michell (16 September 1852 – 13 August 1923) was a Church of England clergyman who played a part in a notable Victorian scandal, and an antiquarian noted as an editor of early modern records. In his youth he was a notable sportsman: an English international rugby union player, as well as an oarsman.

== Birth and background ==
Arthur Tompson Michell was born in Oxford, the sixth child and fifth son of Richard Michell, a clergyman and academic, and of his wife Amelia Blair. They lived on the major thoroughfare St Giles'. Arthur was born on 16 September 1852, when the family was resident at number 38. His sister, a few years older than him, was Mary Caroline, who was to become Duchess of Sutherland and for a time to play a major part in his life as a clergyman.

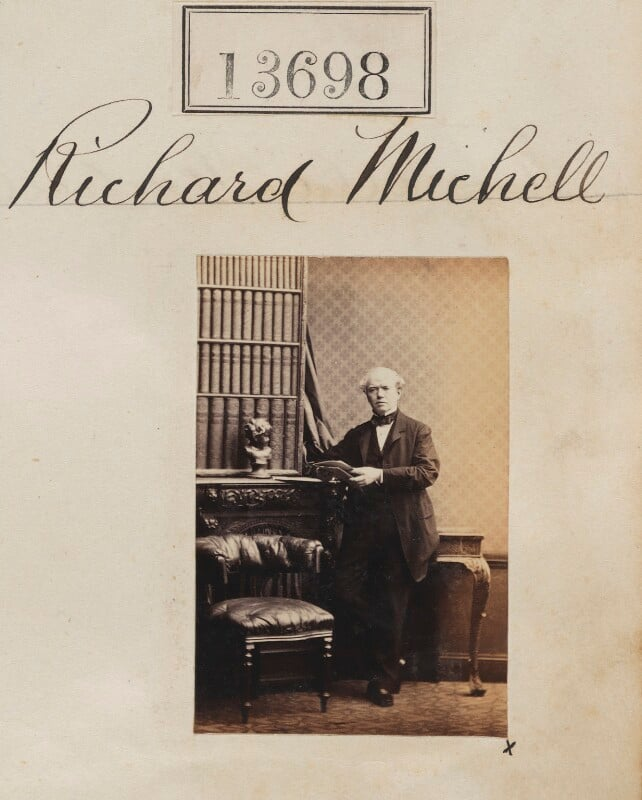
Richard Michell

Arthur's father, Richard Michell, was a prominent academic and was elected Public Orator of Oxford University in 1849, the same year as he delivered the Bampton Lectures. As vice-principal of Magdalen Hall he argued for it to become a full college and later, as principal, he was able to steer its transformation into Hertford College, Oxford. He delivered the Bampton Lectures in 1849. Broadly --Evangelical, he was a committed Conservative and helped organise the party in Oxford. He died in his office at Hertford College in 1877.

== Education ==
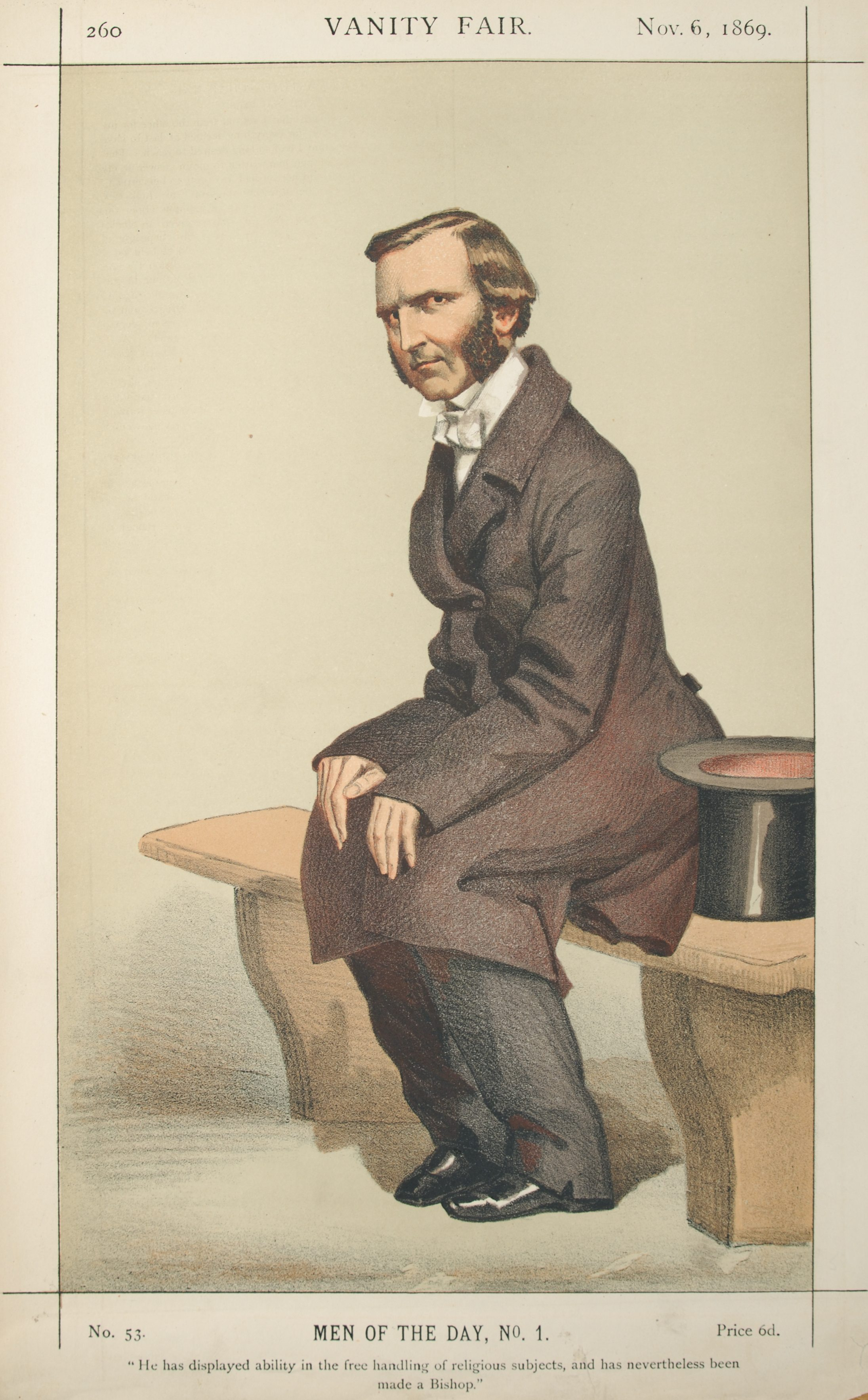
Frederick Temple, as shown in a Vanity Fair caricature, 1869

Arthur Michell was educated from the age of 13 at Rugby School, part of the intake of September 1866. For most of his school years, the school was headed by Frederick Temple, then noted as a liberal theologian, a contributor to the influential Essays and Reviews, and later to become successively Bishop of London and Archbishop of Canterbury. Michell then moved to Oxford University, matriculating at Oriel College on 7 February 1871, achieving BA in 1874, and awarded MA in 1877. He was one of the earliest graduates from the honour school of theology, which had been set up as late as 1869, mainly through the work of Edward Pusey and Henry Liddon, key figures in the Anglo-Catholic movement in the Church of England. However, Arthur Michell graduated with a fourth class honours in theology.

== Sportsman ==
Michell was a varsity sportsman and won a University Sculls championship as an oarsman. He had the most success in rugby, with three blues and captaincy honours. He played rugby for England 1874–1876 and in 1875 alone, Michell gained three England caps playing halfback. He was also captain of the university football team.

Churches served by Arthur Thomson Michell

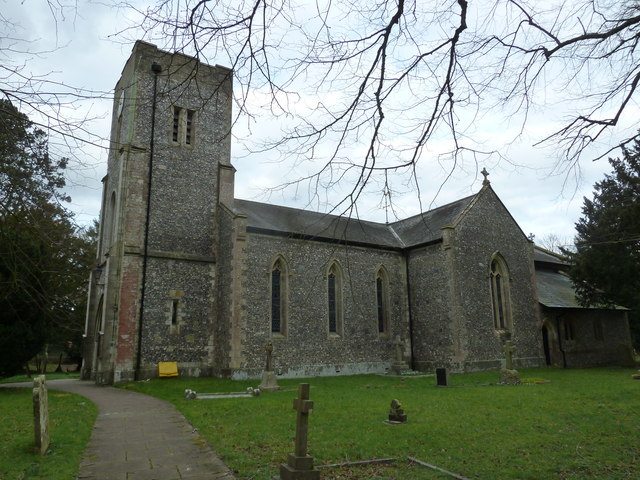
Church of the Ascension, Burghclere

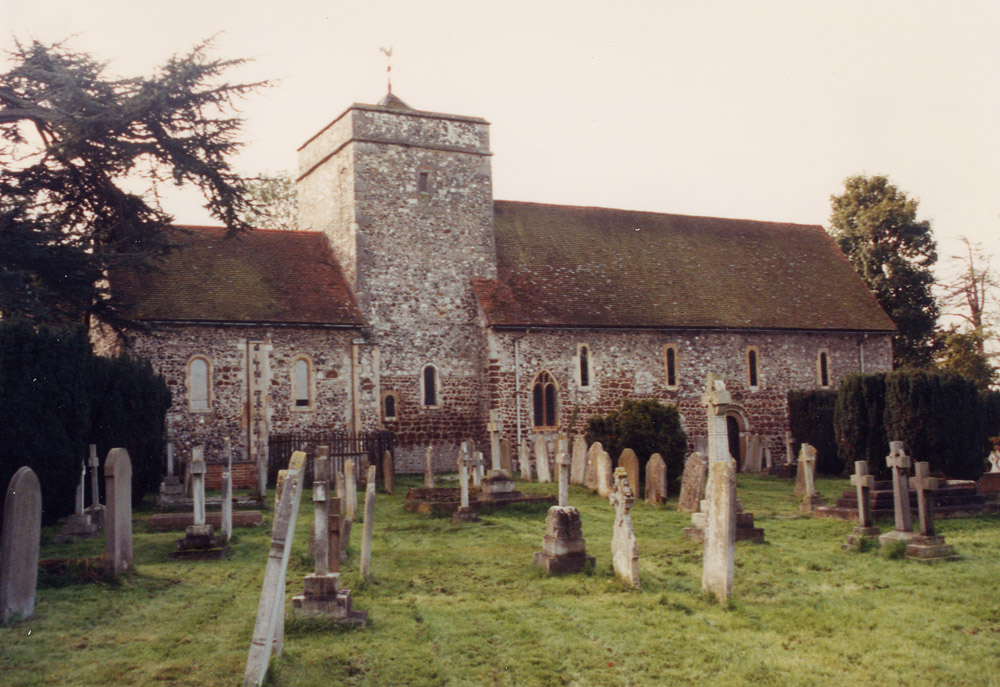
St Laurence's Church, Upton-cum-Chalvey

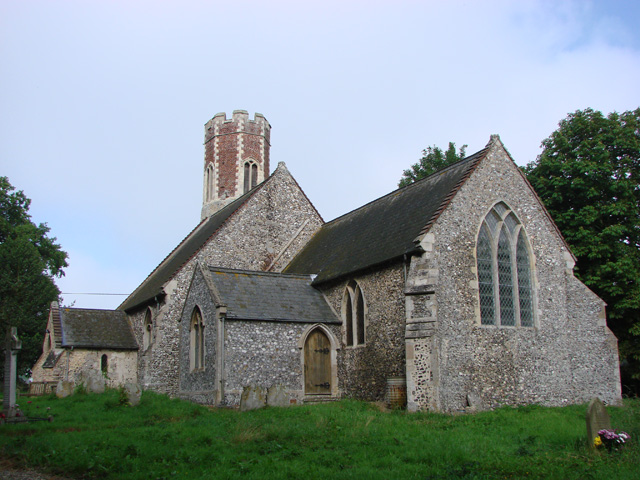
St Peter's Church, Brampton

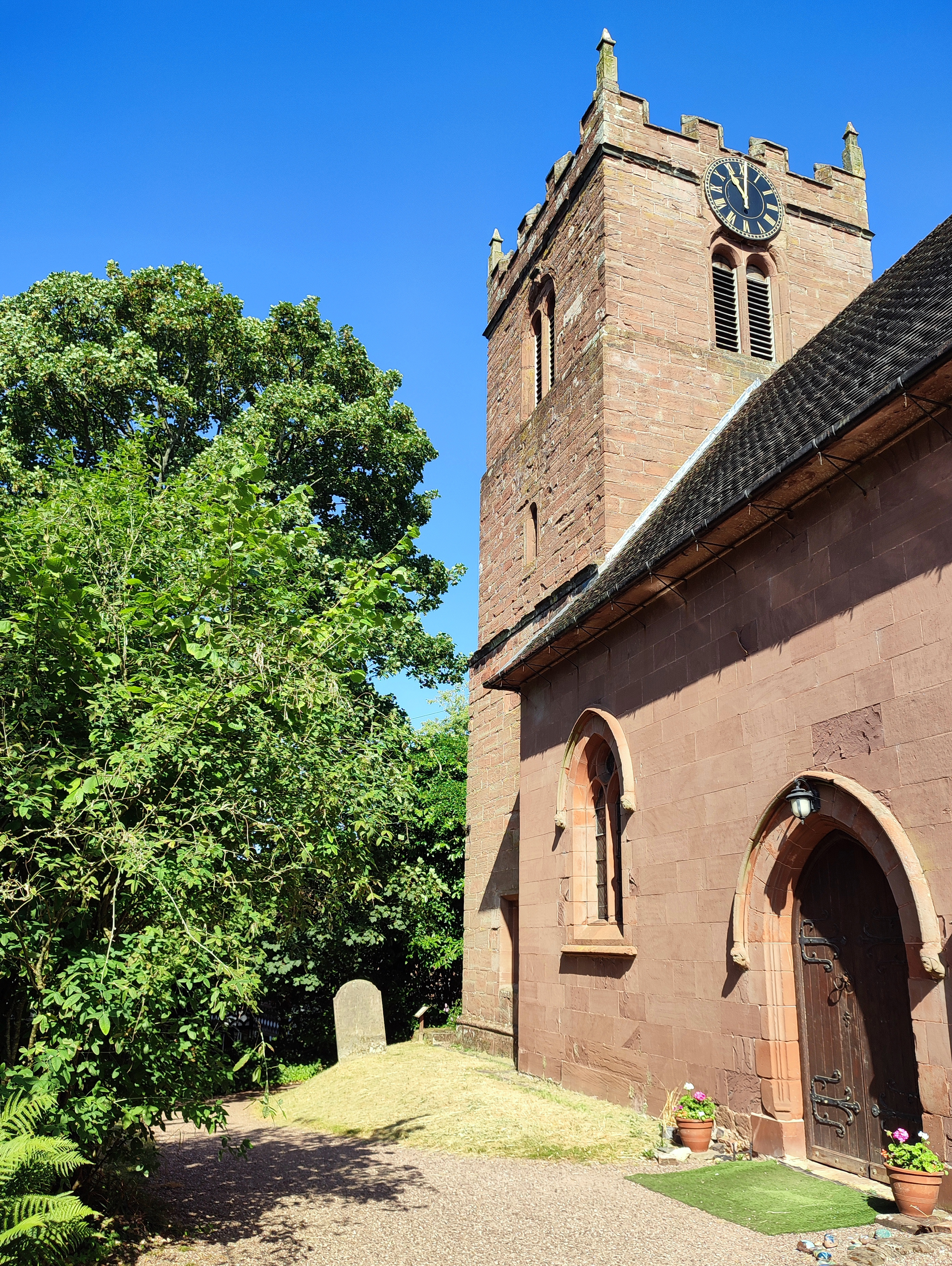
St Mary's Church, Sheriffhales

== Early clerical career ==
Michell was ordained deacon in 1879 and served as curate of Burghclere in Hampshire, where he married Edith Margaret Fox. He was ordained priest in 1881 and the following year moved to a curacy at St Laurence's Church, Upton-cum-Chalvey in Slough, where their son Gilbert was born.

In March 1885 Michell was instituted Rector of Brampton, Norfolk, presented by Rev Henry Philip Marsham of Rippon Hall, Hevingham. The Marsham family, mostly descended from Robert Marsham of Stratton Strawless, were the dominant landowners in the area. Henry Marsham, now retired, was a former rector of both Brampton and Stratton Strawless and was himself the patron of both rectories, as well as that of Wramplingham, to the west of Norwich. Evidently the Marsham family took good care of the Michells as their first daughter Mary was born at Marsham Hall on 22 October 1885, a fact widely advertised in the regional and national press. A month later, Michell was prosecuted by the Inland Revenue and fined 10 shillings by the Aylsham magistrates for employing a servant without obtaining the necessary licence.

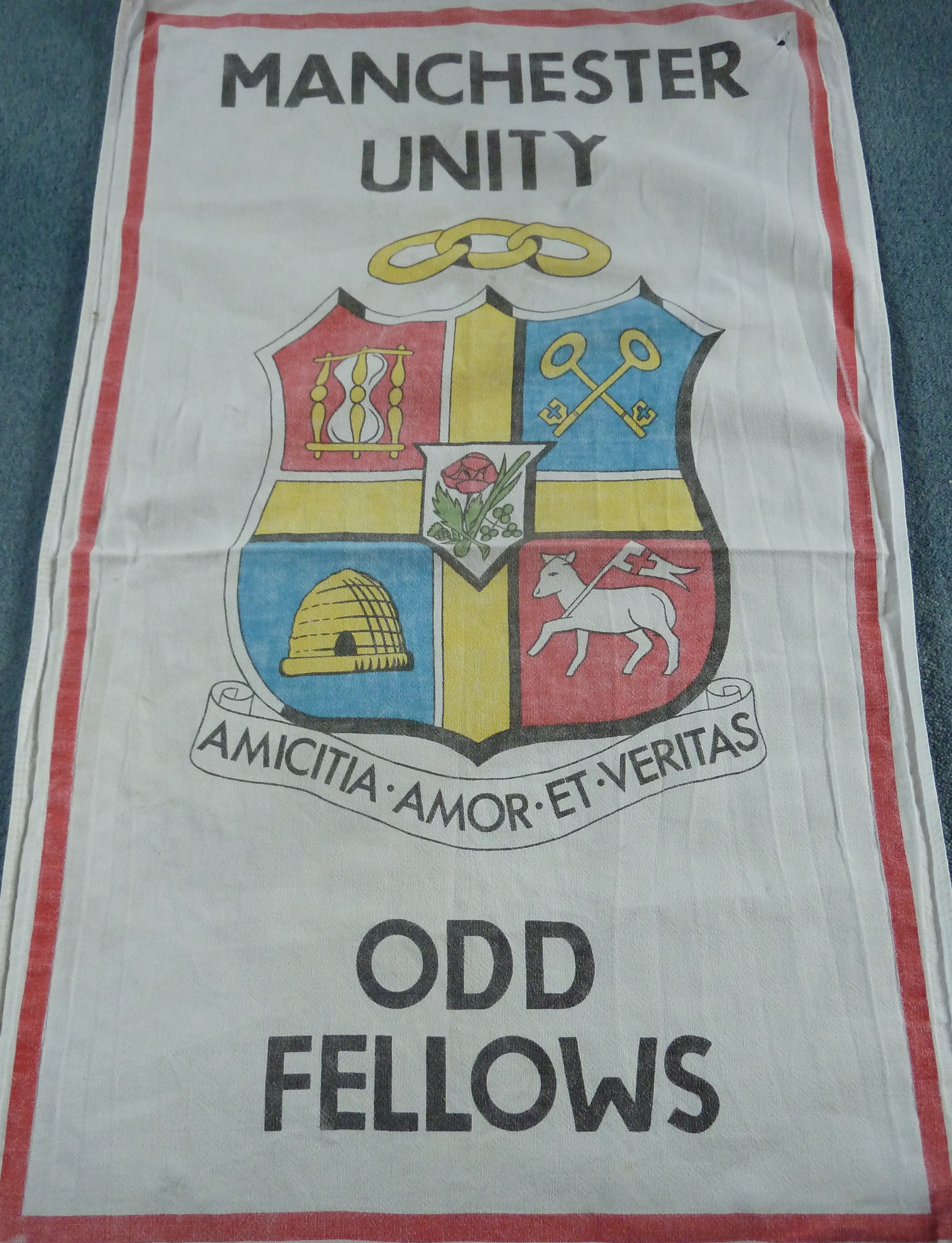
A Manchester Union banner

In April 1889 Michell was made inspector of Church schools for the Diocese of Norwich in the Deanery of South Ingworth. now part of the Deanery of Ingworth and Sparham. In July he was initiated at the Black Boys hotel in Aylsham as an honorary member of the Loyal Marquis of Lothian Lodge of the Manchester Union Independent Order of Oddfellows. This was well-financed lodge of the friendly society, founded in 1847 and initially based on the small tradesmen of the town.

== Presentation to Sheriffhales ==
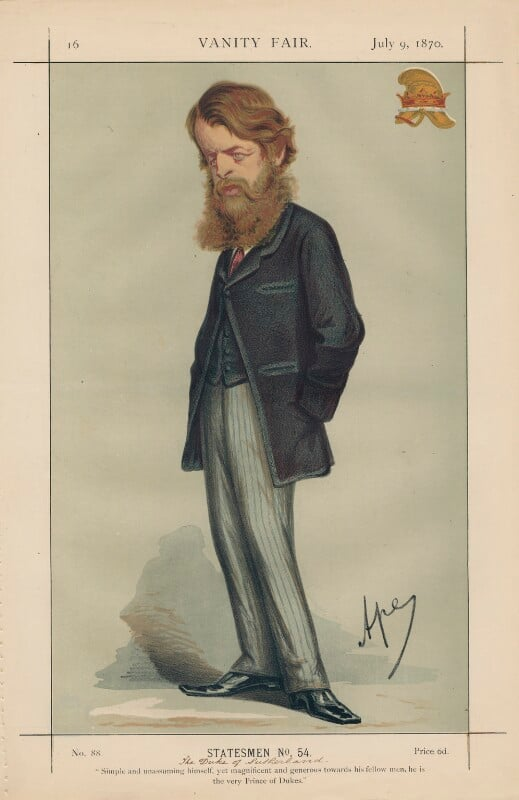
George Granville William Sutherland-Leveson-Gower, 3rd Duke of Sutherland, a Liberal peer and one of the richest men in Britain.

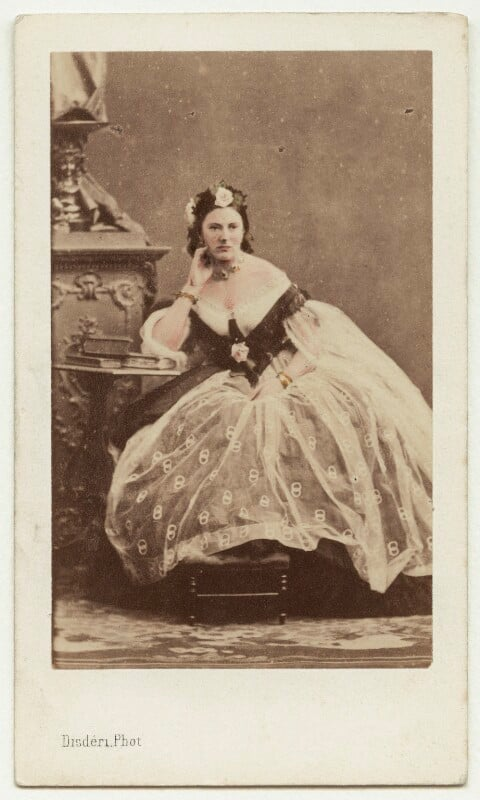
Anne Sutherland Leveson Gower, Duchess of Sutherland, a Liberal society hostess and courtier.

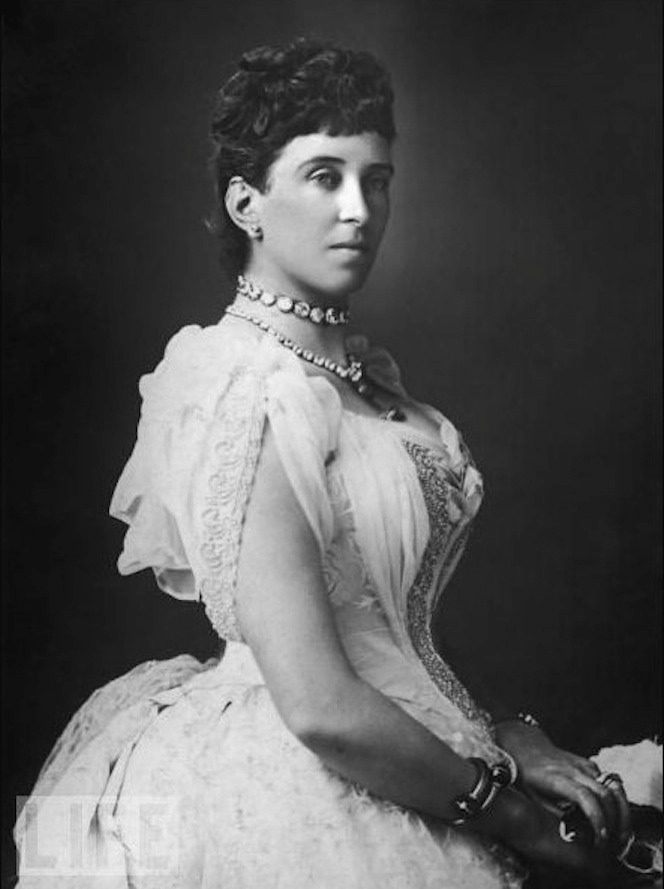
Mary Caroline Blair, the 3rd Duke of Sutherland's second wife and sister of Arthur Thompson Michell.

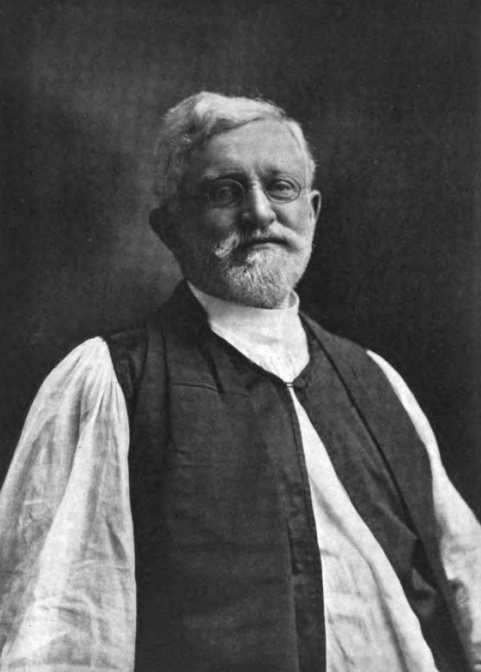
The Rt. Rev. Edwin Gardner Weed, third Episcopal Bishop of Florida, who presided at marriage of the Duke of Sutherland and Mary Blair. Photographed 1913.

On 1 May 1891 The Morning Post, a London Conservative newspaper, announced: "The living of Sheriffhales, Shropshire, in the gift of the Duke of Sutherland, has been offered to the Rev. A. T. Michell, rector of Brampton, Norfolk, and Diocesan Inspector of Schools." There was an obvious sense of urgency, as the offer came immediately after the funeral of Charles Randal Bradburne, the previous incumbent. St Mary's Church, Sheriffhales, although only a vicarage, offered him a slightly better-paid post. The rectory of Brampton was worth £660, while Sheriffhales offered £690 (equivalent to £75,798 in 2025), a minute increase, compared with the problems inherent in a long-distance transfer for his young family. Sheriffhales was not at that time in Shropshire, as the Morning Post asserted, but in Staffordshire, and about 200 miles from Brampton. The real motivation for the move, on Arthur Michell's part, was almost certainly to support his sister, Mary Caroline Blair, who had married George Sutherland-Leveson-Gower, 3rd Duke of Sutherland, two years earlier, after an affair lasting more than five years.

The relationship was surrounded by scandal and relentless press coverage. It began while the Duke was still married to Anne Sutherland-Leveson-Gower, Duchess of Sutherland. Mary Caroline Michell, a few years older than Arthur Michell, had first married Arthur Kindersley Blair, a former army officer, who became an estate manager for the Duke of Sutherland. Blair died on 4 October 1883, in a shooting accident, around the same time as Mary began an affair with the duke. Duchess Anne died on 25 November 1888. The press immediately began to speculate that the duke would marry "the fascinating Mrs. Blair." and become an expatriate in the United States, selling off his London home, Stafford House, and other major holdings in Britain.

The couple actually married in Florida at the beginning of March and the press, was quick to rehearse the background story and to stress that the couple had lived together for two months unmarried on the duke's hunting estate in Florida. Over the next few years the unfolding story was regularly run next to that of Charles Stewart Parnell, who was also under public pressure over his suspected adultery: both stories were used to undermine the moral reputation of the Liberal Party and its allies. The word "scandal" was widely used, the brevity of the mourning period was commented upon and some papers alleged, without evidence, that the duke himself had shot Arthur Blair. On 5 March 1889 it was reported that the wedding had happened: a quiet event, with Bishop Edwin Gardner Weed officiating.

The Duke of Sutherland held numerous advowsons but Sheriffhales parish contained one of his most palatial country homes, Lilleshall Hall. Arthur Michell accepted his presentation to the benefice of Sheriffhales and was inducted on 15 July 1891 by William Maclagan, the Bishop of Lichfield, at the end of period of office before being translated to York.

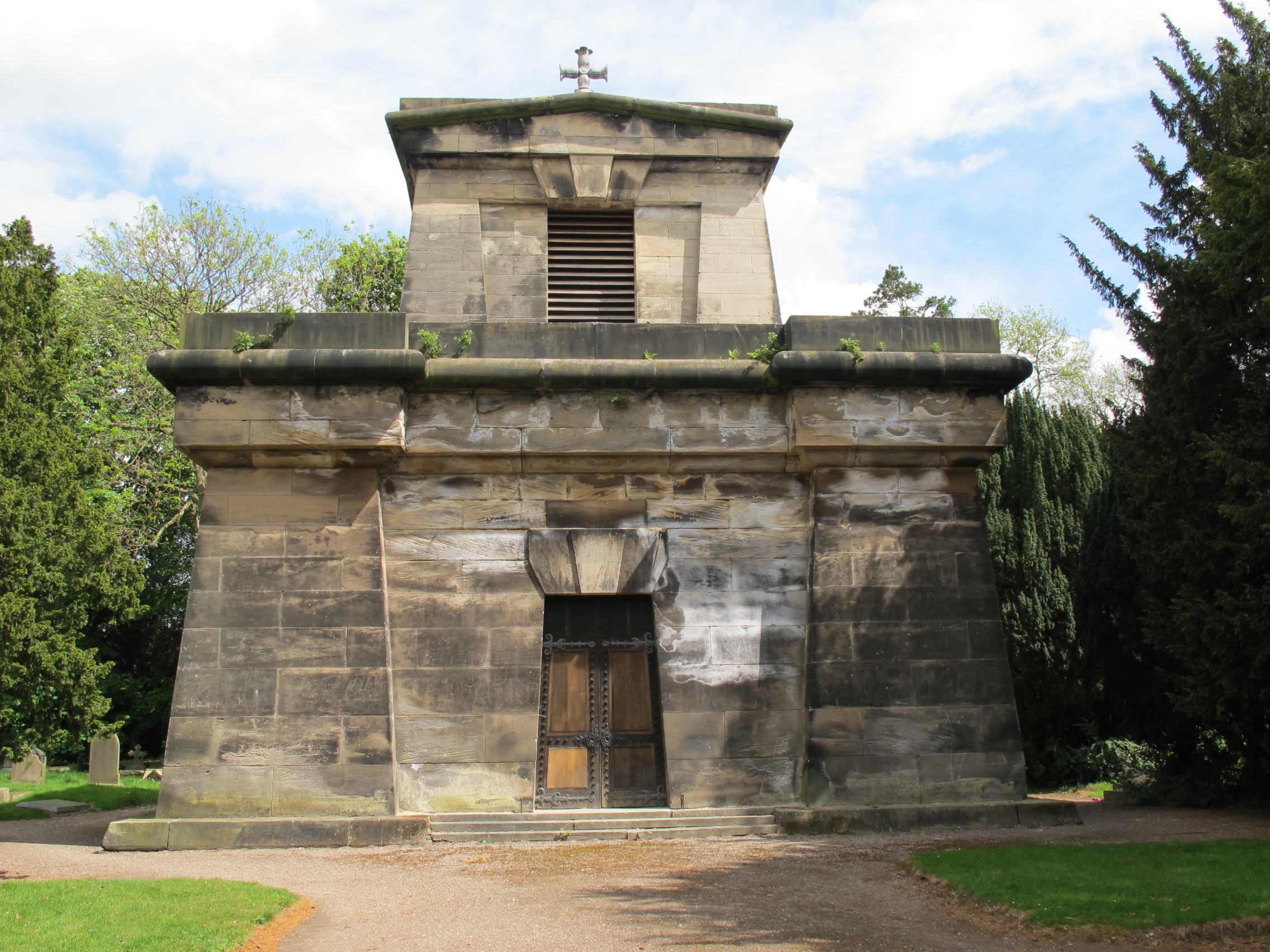
Trentham Mausoleum, the burial place of the first three Dukes of Sutherland

Press and public interest in the ducal marriage had subsided considerably by the time Arthur Michell took up the vicarage of Sheriffhales. However, the Duke of Sutherland's death little more than a year later, in September 1892 at Dunrobin Castle, released another cycle of press coverage and prurient interest. Every detail of the death itself, the aftermath and the funeral was reported by local, regional and national newspapers. Lengthy obituaries repeated the story of the Duke and his second wife, and reports dissected the public behaviour of the dowager duchess and of the duke's own children and their families. The Evening Mail, for example was able to hint at family tensions, noting that Mary had been at the Duke's side when he died, while his second son was ten minutes late, having been forced to travel some distance. It noted that his death might be seen as sudden, an entirely groundless hint at foul play. It claimed that there had been hopes he might be buried at Dornoch Cathedral, which his grandmother and first wife had favoured, but the family had to "acquiesce" in Mary's desire for a burial at Trentham in Staffordshire: in fact, both his father and grandfather lay in Trentham Mausoleum. Arthur Michell accompanied his sister to the funeral, reading the lesson in the service and steadying her during the procession to the burial place.

== Division and discontent ==
Michell soon became embroiled in the conflict that resulted when the deceased duke's family, led by his eldest surviving son, Cromartie Sutherland-Leveson-Gower, 4th Duke of Sutherland, decided to challenge the will, which they considered made excessive provision for Mary Caroline, the dowager and Arthur Michell's sister. She now found herself excluded from Tittensor Chase, a substantial mock-Tudor home dating from about 1856, on the southern edge of the Trentham estate, that she claimed as a dower property. The next Sunday, 9 October 1892, Arthur Michell preached a sermon from the pulpit at St Mary's supporting his sister. Some of his congregation considered that he made disparaging remarks about the new Duke of Sutherland. The church wardens met Michell and tried to persuade him to withdraw of his remarks, which he refused to do. On 31 October a meeting of 300 in the school rooms resolved that Michell's remarks were "uncharitable, unjust and untrue" and expressed sympathy for the duke. It also called for Michell's removal from the benefice because "the ministrations of the Vicar are not acceptable to the parish, and prays the Bishop of the diocese to use his influence to bring about a return of the happy relations that always existed between the vicars and the parishioners." Although Cromartie Sutherland-Leveson-Gower was now the patron of St Mary's Church, Michell continued to support his sister against him. Initially she seemed to be losing the struggle. Mary had been left the use of the family jewels during her lifetime and she had taken them into her own keeping. The Duke of Westminster, her late husband's brother-in-law, who was trustee for the jewels, now demanded she return them so that they could be properly accounted for. She refused to do so unless Tittensor was handed over, until she was compelled to hand them over compelled by an injunction.

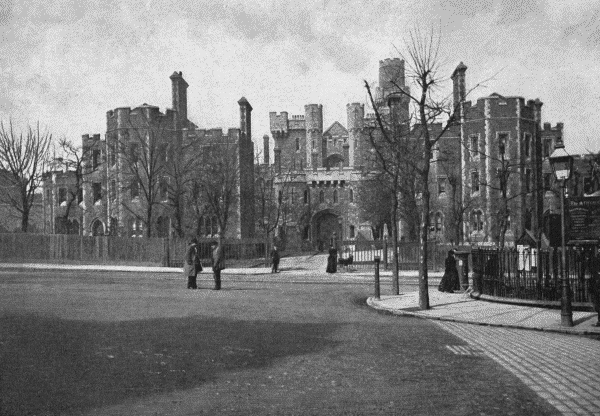
Holloway Prison in the 1890s. The Dowager Duchess of Sutherland was confined in a large apartment over the main gate.

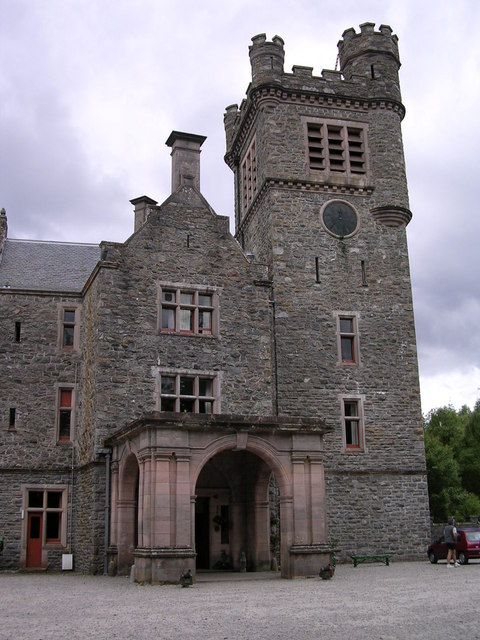
Carbisdale Castle

A local newspaper, the Lichfield Mercury, noted that Mary was staying with Arthur at Sheriffhales vicarage in March 1893, just before the more scandalous aspects of the case came to a head in April. The Probate Division of the High Court authorised a search of Stafford House to find all documents relevant to the case. During the search, Mary pulled a letter from a file and threw it into the fire. She apologised to the court, claiming that it was a private note. However, she was fined £250 and sentenced to six weeks imprisonment for contempt of court. The dowager duchess was released from HM Prison Holloway at the end of May . Despite initial setbacks, partly of her own making, Mary Caroline emerged from the probate processand negotiations vindicated and extremely rich. In 1907 she was to commence construction of her own Scottish castle in Sutherland.

In June 1893, shortly after his sister's release, Arthur Michell was assaulted in St Mary's church yard at Sheriffhales by a stonemason, James Sharples of Oakengates and a labourer, Joseph Hines, in an incident that had connections with his support for his sister. Michell had insisted that a local man, Thomas Plant of Lilyhurst, use a Biblical text on his wife's gravestone, instead of the doggerel he had proposed. Plant had agreed, apparently without much argument. However he had already contacted Sharples, the stonemason. Sharples deliberately went ahead with the original inscription. Michell saw the installation in progress and stood at the head of the grave plot to prevent it. He was then forcibly removed by Joseph Hines, on the instruction of Sharples. The case was heard by the magistrates at Penkridge. Michell alleged that Sharples had said he would remove the stone for the Duke of Sutherland but not for him. The prosecution alleged that Sharples was trying to exacerbate relations between the vicar and the parish. The bench, headed by Baron Hatherton, commended Michell's conduct as "exemplary." However they treated the assault as only technical, fining Sharples and Hines just a shilling each (equivalent to £5 in 2025).

== Local affairs ==
Arthur Michell seems to have lived down his early problems with his parish and area. By 1896, only three years after the critical problems associated with his sister's legal difficulties, he had won election to the Shifnal Board of Guardians, which administered the Poor Law locally. By January 1903 Michell was a member of Shifnal Rural District Council, and at that time was active in discussions about the need for an isolation facility for smallpox patients in the district. A Mr Hoole actually offered to provide a cottage at Sheriffhales for the purpose. This public work continued throughout Michell's ministry. His death notice in the Shrewsbury Chronicle said that "he took an active part in local public affairs, and was one of the oldest members and most regular attender at the meetings of the Shifnal Board of Guardians and Rural District Council." He continued especially his concern with health: in 1910 Michell was a founder of the local branch of the county Association for the Prevention of Consumption, covering the Shifnal district, and aimed at setting up a Shropshire sanatorium.

== Antiquarian ==
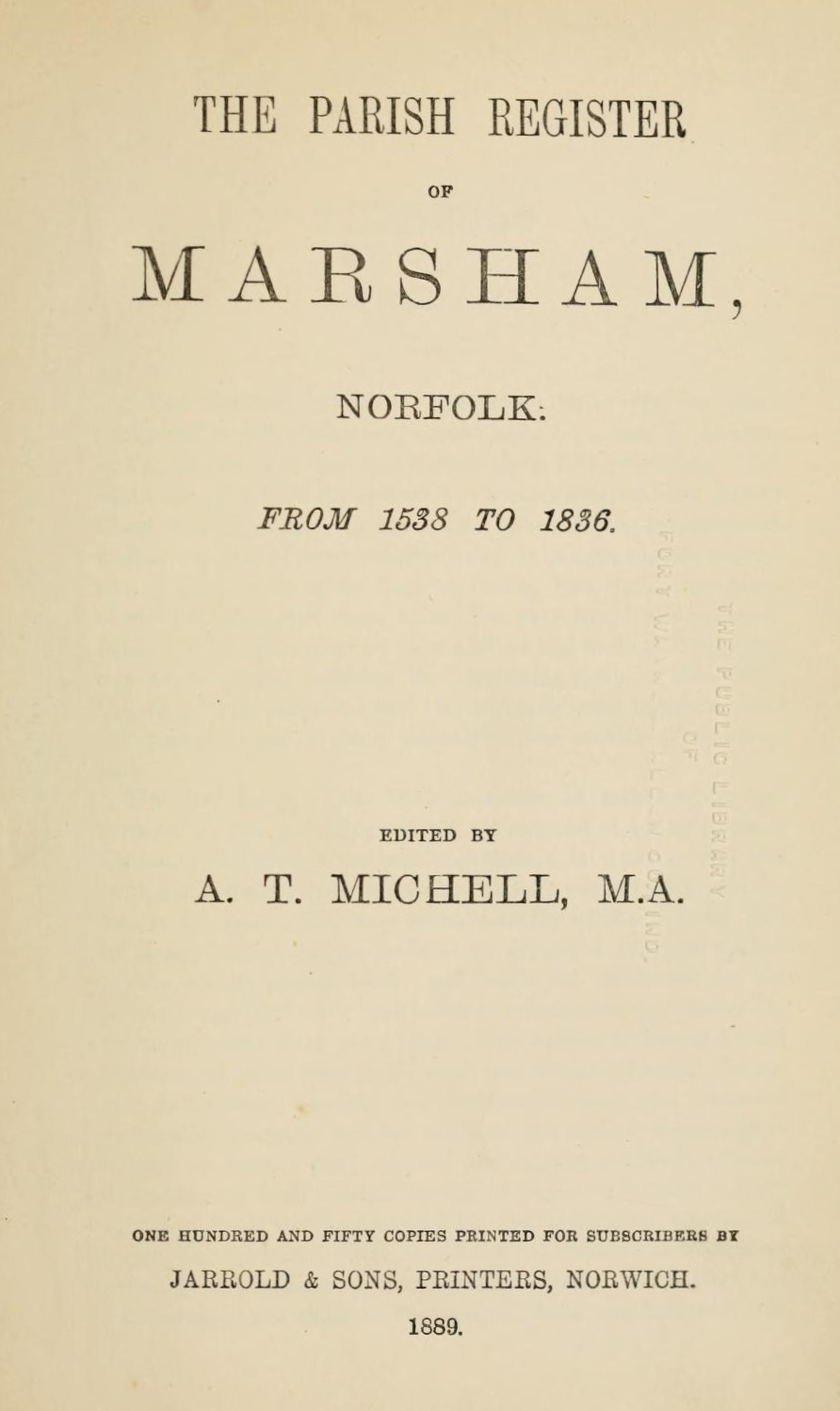
Title page of Marsham parish register, edited by A T Michell and published 1889.

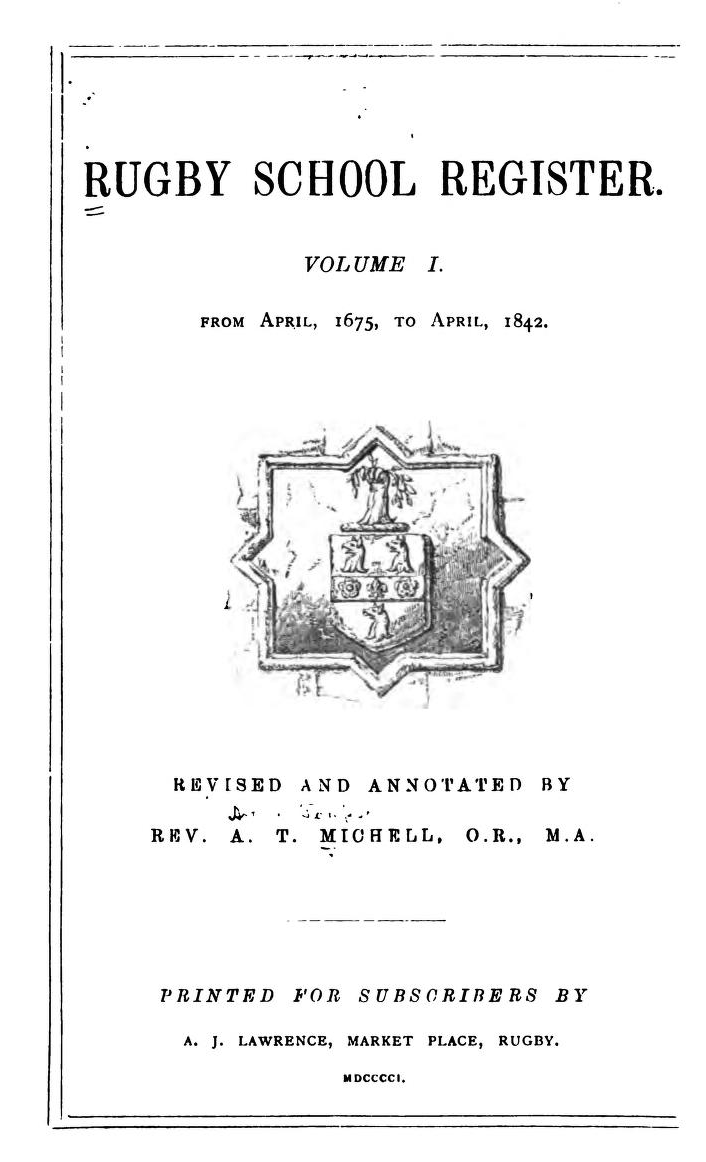
Rugby School Register volume 1, title page, edited by A T Michell, 1891.

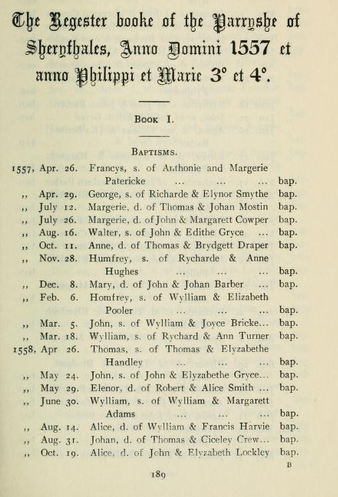
First page of the printed edition of the Sheriffhales, Shropshire, parish register, published 1909.

Michell was a noted antiquarian, specialising in the preparation of historical records for publication - an important preoccupation in the Victorian and Edwardian periods, when a large quantity of public records were made accessible for the first time. While at Brampton he had edited the records of the neighbouring parish of Marsham. This was issued in an edition of 150 copies for the subscribers who financed the work in 1889. During Michell's early years at Sheriffhales edition of the Rugby School register began publication. In 1891, came the first volume, containing entries up to 1842. He listed admissions chronologically, one intake at a time, with brief details of subsequent careers where these were known. A comprehensive index made it easy to find entries: a key feature of all his subsequent work. The second volume followed in 1892, the year the Sutherland family feud broke out. This included his own period at the school and took the register up to 1874. It seems likely that the bulk of the work on these volumes was carried out before Michell was presented to the vicarage at in Sheriffhales. Probably because of the time pressures of his very public life thereafter, the third and final volume did not appear until 1904. This took the entries up to date and incorporated some corrected or revised material for the earlier periods.

In 1903 Michell was elected a Fellow of the Society of Antiquaries of London. and the title page of his third volume on Rugby School was able to bear the initials FSA. By this time Michell must have been working on an edition of the Sheriffhales parish register. In 1900 he had attended a meeting of the Shropshire Parish Register Society in Shrewsbury, where he was thanked for his work on the project and Sheriffhales was listed among the parishes due to have their records printed. In reality the register was at that point nowhere near ready for publication. It was not signed off by Michell until February 1908. and finally published in 1909. It was incorporated in a volume with three other Shropshire parishes in Lichfield Diocese: Montford, Clive and Hordley. In his preface to the volume, the secretary of the society, W G D Fletcher, acknowledged that Michell was responsible for the entire section relating to Sheriffhales. Michell's compressed introduction gave a useful account of the parish, its manors and major buildings, including St Mary's church, and a two-page spread identifying the known clergy and accounting for their careers so far as known.

== Later years ==
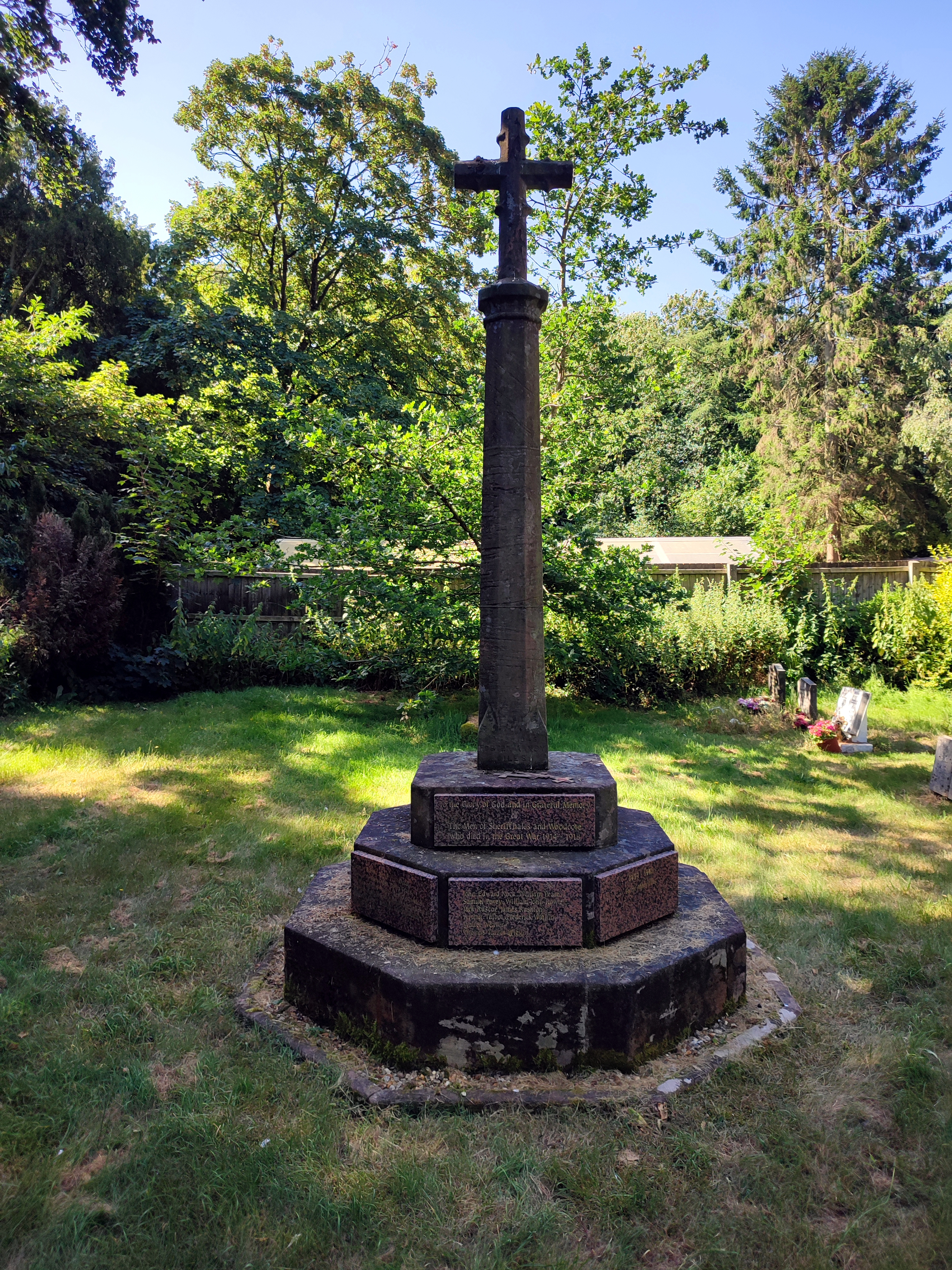
Sheriffhales war memorial, 1921

World War I accelerated change in the English countryside generally but to a great extent in Sheriffhales and the other Midland areas dominated by the Sutherland family. George Sutherland-Leveson-Gower, 5th Duke of Sutherland, continued a process begun by his father, selling off the Shropshire and Staffordshire estates in small to medium lots between 1914 and 1917. The vast Lilleshall estate of 7500 acres, including Lilleshall Hall in Sheriffhales parish, was put on the market in January 1917. With many more small and medium independent farmers, and a few big landholders, both institutional and private, based outside the area, the church struggled to raise money for local projects. At a meeting at Sheriffhales during May 1921, to discuss the erection of a war memorial, Arthur Michell pointed out that a group of ex-service personnel had already campaigned to build a commemorative village hall, but the funds were not forthcoming. A more modest memorial was proposed and Michell persuaded those present that it should be in the church or churchyard. By 5 December 1921 a sandstone cross, bearing the names of the war dead of both Sheriffhales and Woodcote, had been installed in the southern extension to the churchyard. It was dedicated by John Kempthorne, the Bishop of Lichfield.

Sir John Leigh, became patron of the benefice of Sheriffhales through his purchase of Lilleshall Hall. Newspaper photograph c. 1922.

The sale of Lilleshall Hall was accompanied by a transfer of the three advowsons that went with it to Sir John Leigh. Leigh was a cotton baron and landowner form Cheshire and had great social and political ambition. In May 1922 he was elected, unopposed, for the Conservative seat of Clapham, vacated when the previous occupant, Arthur Du Cros was forced to resign after a series of marital and financial scandals. The The Pall Mall Gazette, apparently owned by Leigh himself, commented: "Sir John is reputed to be one of the wealthiest men in the country. He has not hesitated to use the position that wealth has given him for the benefit of his fellows."

Arthur Michell was now approaching 70 years of age. He resigned the benefice, apparently always intending to return to his home town of Oxford. Captain Foster, the tenant of Woodcote Hall, presided at the parish's retirement presentation to Michell on 25 July 1922. He pointed out that the changes Michell had seen were momentous, with almost every acre of land changing hands. Michell himself pointed out that Sheriffhales itself had been moved from Staffordshire to Shropshire earlier in his incumbency, with a consequent change of archdeaconry. He claimed that he was most happy with his work for the Board of Guardians and the Rural District Council. Edith Michell was too ill to receive the presentation item a silver kettle.

== Death ==
Arthur and Edith Michell moved to Oxford and lived at 6 Crick Road, north of the university parks and close to Lady Margaret Hall. Arthur died at the age of 70 on 13 August 1923, less than a year after leaving the parish of Sheriffhales. His funeral was held at St Giles' Church, Oxford. He was buried at Wolvercote Cemetery. He left £18,340, net £13,056 (equivalent to £682,601 in 2025) His wife Edith outlived him by more than a decade, dying on 10 November 1934 at the age of 76.

== Family ==
Arthur Thompson Michell married Edith Margaret Fox, daughter of Susan Cordelia, née Fanshawe, and William Fox, in 1882, at Burghclere, Hampshire, while he was curate there. She was about five years younger than himself. They had three children.

- Gilbert Arthur Michell (1883—1960) was a High Church Anglican priest with a special interests in priestly education and formation and in Anglican communities overseas. Educated at Rugby School and Lincoln College, Oxford, he graduated BA, with a 1st in Modern History 1906 and a 2nd in Theology 1907, and MA 1909. Later he became a BD and DD. After a year at Cuddesdon College, he was ordained deacon in 1909 and priest in 1910. He served as curate at both St Barnabas Church, Oxford and St Alban's Church, Holborn. He was Principal of St Stephen's House in Oxford 1919—1936. He served as Examining Chaplain to the Anglican Bishop of Zanzibar 1914—1943 and Commissary for the Anglican Diocese of Masasi 1926—1944. For a long period he lived at a house called Champflower, near the rectory at Storrington in West Sussex. In 1939 the register taken at the beginning of World War II found him there and described him as a clerk in holy orders, but also as retired. He was at the same address in 1947. It was still his home address when he died on 24 April 1960 at the Seabrook Nursing Home in Worthing.

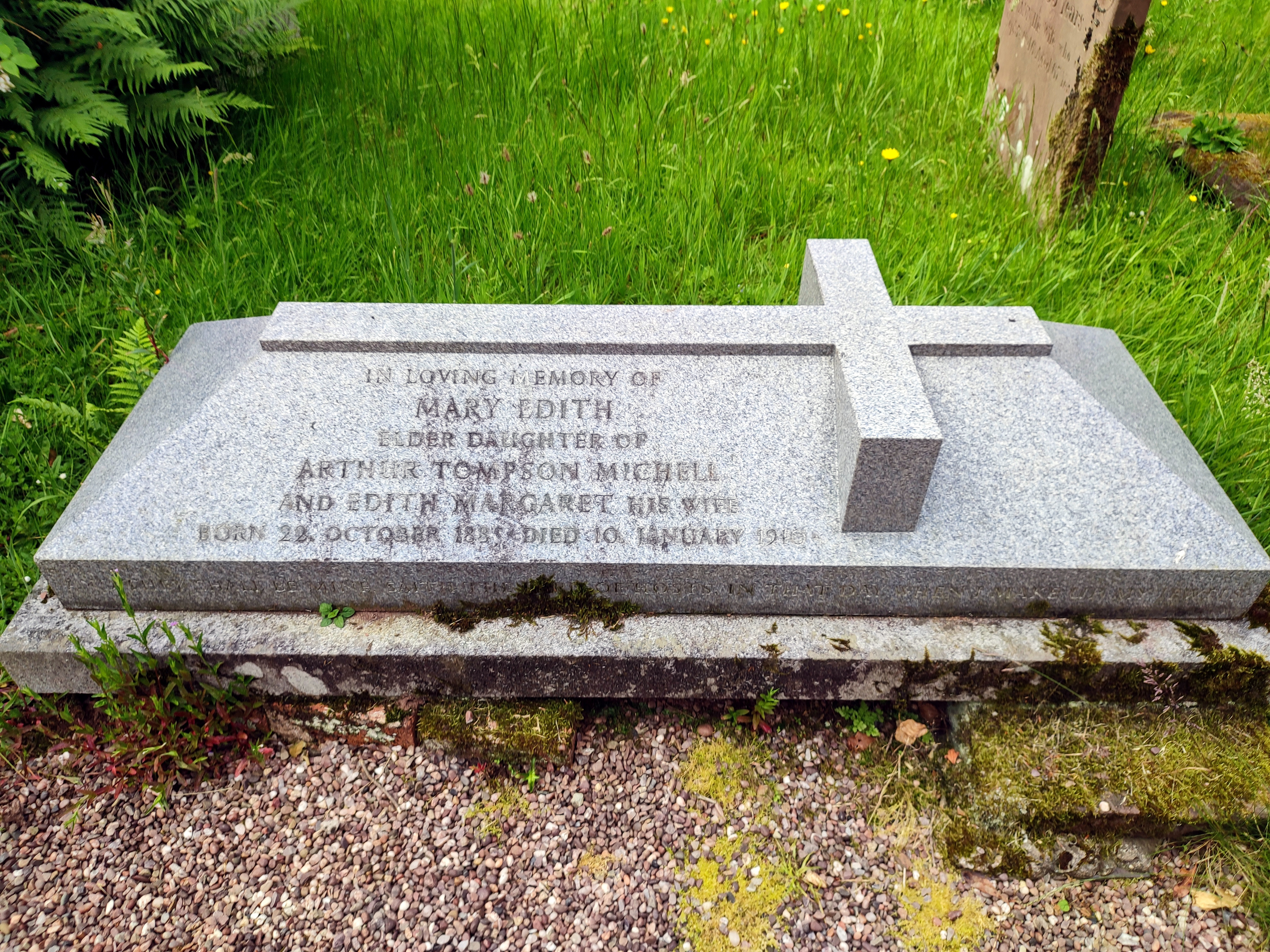
Grave of Mary Edith Michell, St Mary's Church, Sheriffhales, 1910. Located next to path beside south aisle.

- Mary Edith Michell (1885—1910) was born in Marsham while Arthur Michell was rector of Brampton. She died on 10 January 1910, at the age of 24, and was buried in Sheriffhales churchyard on 14 January. Her brother Gilbert, who was then a deacon, working as curate in Oxford at the Church of St Barnabas, assisted at her funeral.
- Margaret Granville Michell was born on 3 July 1891 at Marsham Hall, just before the Michells moved to Sheriffhales. She was baptised at Brampton on 9 August 1891 She married Hans Kuehnemann in the summer of 1937 in the Paddington registration district of London. Kuehnemann was presumably a German citizen. At the outbreak of World War II Margaret was regarded as German, and in danger of being interned as an enemy alien, but successfully applied for exemption. She was recorded on a list of recently naturalised people in the London Gazette in 1947, having taken the oath of allegiance on 10 December 1946. She was named in a long list of refugees from Central and Eastern Europe, many probably of Jewish background. She was recorded as German and living at 5 Ladbroke Gardens, London W11, without occupation. She was still living at the same address in 1951. This was a large Victorian terraced house in the Ladbroke Estate inNotting Hill, built almost 100 years earlier. It was probably divided into a number of flats, as several families lived at the same address. However, there is no mention of her husband at the address. Margaret Granville Kuehnemann died on 19 February 1988 at Reigate, at the age of 96, and was buried on 24 February.

== See also ==
- List of England national rugby union players
- St Mary's Church, Sheriffhales
