= Ready =

Ready may refer to:

== Film and television ==
- Ready, a 2002 British short starring Imelda Staunton
- Ready (2008 film), an Indian Telugu-language film by Srinu Vaitla
  - Uthamaputhiran (2010 film), working title Ready, an Indian Tamil-language remake
  - Ready (2011 film), an Indian Hindi-language remake
- "Ready" (New Girl), a television episode

== Music ==
- Ready Records, a Canadian record label

=== Albums ===
- Ready! (Nami Tamaki album), 2011
- Ready (Sandy Lam album), 1988
- Ready (Trey Songz album), 2009
- Ready, by Reni Lane, 2010

=== EPs ===
- Ready (Ella Mai EP), 2017
- Ready (Victon EP), 2017
- Ready (Ruel EP), 2018

=== Songs ===
- "Ready" (Alessia Cara song), 2019
- "Ready" (B.o.B song), 2013
- "Ready" (Fabolous song), 2013
- "Ready" (Kodaline song), 2015
- "Ready?", by Tomoko Kawase, 2005
- "Ready", by Black Rob from The Black Rob Report, 2005
- "Ready", by Cat Stevens from Buddha and the Chocolate Box, 1974
- "Ready", by Cherie from the Confessions of a Teenage Drama Queen soundtrack album, 2004
- "Ready", by Jagged Edge from J.E. Heartbreak 2, 2014
- "Ready", by Kelly Clarkson from All I Ever Wanted, 2009
- "Ready", by Kovas, 2010
- "Ready", by Montaigne from Complex, 2019
- "Ready", by N-Toon from Toon Time, 2000
- "Ready", a gospel song with music by Charles Davis Tillman, 1903

== Other uses ==
- Ready (surname), persons with the surname Ready
- Ready, Kentucky, a community in the United States
- Ready PAC, a 2013–2015 U.S. super PAC supporting Hillary Clinton
- HMS Ready (J223), a World War I minesweeper
- IF Ready, a Norwegian sports club

== See also ==
- Reddy (disambiguation)
