= Margaret Read =

Margaret Read may refer to:

- Margaret Read (architect)
- Margaret Read (anthropologist)
- Margaret Read (musician)
- Margaret Read MacDonald, née Read, American storyteller, folklorist, and children's book author

== See also ==
- Margaret Reid (disambiguation)
