= Andy Reid (disambiguation) =

Andy Reid (born 1958) is the head coach of the Kansas City Chiefs of the NFL.

Andy or Andrew Reid may also refer to:

- Andrew Reid (writer) (died c. 1767), Scottish writer
- Andrew Reid (brewer) (1751–1841), Scottish businessperson
- Andrew G. Reid (1878–1941), American football player, coach and athletics administrator
- Andy Reid (Scottish footballer), footballer of the 1920s and 1930s
- Andrew Reid (lawyer) (born 1954), British lawyer, racehorse trainer, and Treasurer of the UK Independence Party
- Andy Reid (running back) (born 1954), American football running back
- Andy Reid (footballer, born 1962), English footballer, see List of Bury F.C. players (25–99 appearances)
- Andy Reid (Irish footballer) (born 1982), Irish footballer
- Andrew Reid (motorcyclist) (born 1994), British motorcycle racer

== See also ==
- Andrew Reed (disambiguation)
- Andrew Read, British medical geneticist
