= Charles Kane =

Charles Kane may refer to:

- Charles Kane, a character in 2000 video game Tomb Raider: Chronicles
- Charles Foster Kane, the protagonist of the 1941 American film Citizen Kane
- Charles Kane (business executive) (21st century), president & chief operating officer of the OLPC Association
- Charlie Kane (boxer) (born 1968), British Olympic boxer
- Charles L. Kane (born 1963), theoretical physicist
- Samantha Kane (born 1960), barrister and businesswoman who previously went by the name Charles Kane
