= Katherine Read =

Katherine Read or variations may refer to:

- Kathy Read, English swimmer
- Catherine Read, Scottish artist
- Katherine S. Reed, American screenwriter and playwright
- Katherine Reid, former member of the Washington State Senate
- Katharine Lee Reid, American art historian
- Catherine Reid, New Zealand palaeontologist
- Katherine Reed Balentine, American suffragist
