= Samantha Kane =

Barrister and businesswoman (born 1960)

- Born: January 1960 (age 66); Baghdad, Iraq
- Other names: Charles Kane (2004–2017); Lady Carbisdale
- Education: Cardiff University; Northumbria University
- Occupations: barrister; businesswoman

Samantha Kane (formerly Charles Kane; born January 1960) is an Iraqi-born British barrister and businesswoman. Kane came under media scrutiny in 1990 when she led a takeover bid for Sheffield United F.C. as head of a Saudi Arabian investment firm. After coming out as a transgender woman in 1998, she was interviewed for the role of the club's next chief executive; she was ultimately forced to resign from her investment firm. From 2004 to 2017, she took a male gender identity, going by the given name Charles, but later came out again as a transgender woman. Since 2022, she owns the Carbisdale Castle in the Scottish Highlands and, as the Laird, has styled herself as Lady Carbisdale. (Note: Kane uses this self-styled courtesy title as the lady of the manor of Carbisdale Castle and not as a substantive title in relation to peerages in the United Kingdom.)

== Early life and family ==
Born in Baghdad, Iraq in January 1960, Samantha Kane was assigned male at birth and was her family's eldest son at the time. She grew up in the conservative Hashimi family in Iraq. According to the Times, the Hashimi family is part of the "deposed Iraqi branch" of the Hashemite royal family of Jordan. Her father held progressive views while her mother, a socialite, was more conservative in her views.

Kane thought of herself as a girl as early as she could remember in her childhood. As a teenager, her parents sent her to London to complete her schooling after they discovered she was in a relationship with a boy in 1976. She subsequently lost contact with her parents and did not return to Iraq; her younger brother, who served in the Iraqi army and later moved to Los Angeles, inherited the family fortune after their death. She attended Cardiff University and then studied engineering at Northumbria University.

== Business career ==
Kane eventually became a multimillionaire while leading a Saudi Arabian investment and property firm that, among other projects, worked with hotels on Park Lane and the property that would become the Lanesborough. In 1990, she launched an ultimately unsuccessful takeover bid for the football club Sheffield United F.C. After it was announced that the club had agreed to a £6.25 million takeover bid by Kane, some club supporters expressed opposition to the bid and a counter-bid was lodged. According to the Straits Times, she did not confirm reports that she was fronting the takeover bid for the mayor of Jeddah, Saudi Arabia, Abdul Momenhah, who owns a football club in Jeddah; she did confirm that she was connected to Momenhah. The club's chairman Reg Brealey announced later in the month that it would not sell out to Kane, after most of the directors said they opposed foreign ownership and would resign if the deal went through.

Kane married her first wife in 1984, with whom she had two children. They separated after 12 years. Kane began her gender transition during the divorce, which included sex reassignment surgery in 1997 among other medical procedures, and she changed her name to Samantha Kane. She spoke with publicist Max Clifford about maintaining her career with the publicity of her gender transition; he told Kane that she would become a "laughing stock" if she moved forward with her transition. A self-published autobiography followed.

In 1998, Kane was reported to have been interviewed to become Sheffield United's new chief executive. She told an Independent interviewer that her goal in the role would be to "... attract one million Sheffield United supporters in Asia and the Middle East to watch the matches on subscription television." At one point after returning to public attention, Kane had a documentary film crew follow her. As media focus shifted onto her identity as a transgender woman, she was forced to leave her investment firm because they did not think she could represent such a business with a masculine image as Sheffield.

== Later life ==
Kane moved to Newcastle upon Tyne in 2003 to study for a postgraduate diploma in law to train as a barrister. She was called to the bar in 2004. In 2004, she changed her given name to Charles and took a male gender identity. She later ascribed the decision to the bullying her son received at school because of her transgender identity. She would maintain that identity for the next fourteen years. Kane underwent a procedure that year to reverse her previous sex reassignment surgery, which was the subject of the BBC documentary One Life: Make me a Man Again.

Also in 2004, Kane brought a case to the General Medical Council (GMC) against NHS Charing Cross Hospital consultant psychiatrist and gender reassignment expert Russell Reid, whom she first saw in 1997 after the breakdown of her marriage led to a "severe mental breakdown". Kane alleged that Reid had prematurely referred her for sex reassignment surgery in violation of international standards of medical care. Three other psychiatrists at Charing Cross submitted Kane's complaint and those of 11 other patients to the GMC. More than 150 of Reid's patients supported him, and Claire McNab, of the transgender advocacy group Press for Change, also noted that Reid had been defended by several other experts. GMC concluded an inquiry in 2007 through which it found that Reid was guilty of serious professional misconduct.

Kane came out as a transgender woman for the second time in 2017 and began using Samantha as her given name again. In 2024, she made a legal claim against the University College London Hospitals NHS Foundation Trust in which she alleged that she was denied treatment on two occasions, once when asking for a third gender reassignment surgery and the other after she had undergone a "botched" procedure in Serbia in 2018.

As of 2024, Kane leads a legal practice named Holland Park Chambers. After the Supreme Court ruling in For Women Scotland Ltd v The Scottish Ministers (2025) on whether someone with a female gender recognition certificate can be legally considered (for the purposes of the Equality Act 2010) a woman, Kane asserted that the ruling would lead to a transphobic backlash against an "already marginalised" group.

=== Carbisdale Castle ===
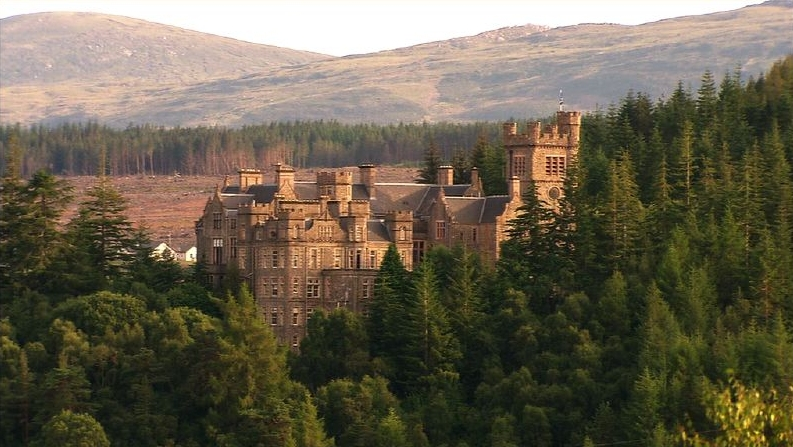
Carbisdale Castle, in Scotland, photographed in 2006

After decades as a hostel, Carbisdale Castle, in the Scottish Highlands, was put up for sale in April 2021, priced at £1.5 million. Intrigued by the history of Mary Caroline Blair, the duchess for whom the castle was built, Kane purchased the estate in October 2022. She subsequently began its restoration. Styling herself as Lady Carbisdale, Kane used the castle as her residence but planned to partially open it to the public. Kane listed the estate for sale in late 2024 after experiencing what she described as a campaign of transphobic abuse. A local councillor was briefly suspended in 2025 after agreeing that he had violated the council's code of conduct over a matter related to the estate.
