= Carbisdale =

Carbisdale may refer to:

- Battle of Carbisdale (27 April 1650), part of the Wars of the Three Kingdoms, took place close to the Village of Culrain, Scotland
- Carbisdale Castle (built 1907), located on a hill across the Kyle of Sutherland from Invershin in the Scottish Highlands
