= Douglas Reid =

Douglas or Doug Reid may refer to:

- Douglas Reid (priest) (1934–2000), dean of Glasgow and Galloway
- Douglas Miller Reid (1897–1959), Scottish schoolmaster and amateur botanist
- Douglas Reid (cricketer) (1886–1959), Australian cricketer
- Doug Reid (Canadian football) (1924–2007), Canadian football player
- Doug Reid (tennis) (1934–2014), Australian tennis player
- Doug Reid (cricketer) (born 1928), New Zealand cricketer

== See also ==
- Douglas Reed (1895–1976), British novelist and political commentator
- Doug Reed (born 1960), American football player
