= Reid (given name) =

Reid is a given name. Notable people with the name include:

- Reid Anderson (born 1970), American jazz bassist
- Reid Boucher (born 1993), American ice hockey player
- Reid Carrico (born 2002), American football player
- Reid Detmers, American baseball player
- Reid Duke (born 1989), American Magic: the Gathering player
- Reid Ewing (born 1988), American actor and musician
- Reid Hoffman, American businessman, co-founder of LinkedIn
- Reid Sinnett (born 1996), American football player
- Reid Stowe (born 1952), American mariner and visual artist
- Reid Travis (born 1995), American basketball player
- Reid Wiseman (born 1975), commander of the Artemis II lunar mission

== See also ==
- Reid, surname
- Reed (name), given name and surname
