= Riedy =

Riedy is a surname. Notable people with the surname include:

- Bob Riedy (born 1945), American basketball player
- Matt Riedy, American actor

== See also ==
- Ried
- Reidy
