= Ried =

Ried may refer to:

== Places ==
=== Alsace ===
- Ried (natural region)

=== Austria ===
- Ried in der Riedmark, a market town in Upper Austria
- Ried im Innkreis, a city in Upper Austria and the surrounding Bezirk Ried im Innkreis
- Ried im Oberinntal, a village in Tyrol
- Ried im Traunkreis, a village in Upper Austria
- Ried im Zillertal, a village in Tyrol

=== Germany ===
- Ried, Bavaria in Landkreis Aichach-Friedberg in Bavaria
- District of the city Schrobenhausen, Bavaria
- Part of Ebersburg in the District of Fulda in Hessen
- Part of Gemeinde Feldkirchen-Westerham in Landkreis Rosenheim in Bavaria
- Part of the village Altmannstein in Landkreis Eichstätt
- Part of the village Eriskirch on Lake Constance
- Part of the village Frauenneuharting in the District of Ebersberg, Bavaria
- Part of the village Kochel am See in the District of Bad Tölz-Wolfratshausen in Bavaria
- Part of the village Obermaiselstein in the District of Oberallgäu in Bavaria
- Part of the village Pfronten in Bavaria
- Riedstadt, Hesse, near Frankfurt am Main and Darmstadt

=== Netherlands ===
- Ried, Friesland, in Franekeradeel in Friesland

=== Switzerland ===
- Ried bei Kerzers, in Canton Fribourg (1902-1911: Ried; before 1902: Oberried (Sea))
- Ried-Blatten, in Canton Valais
- Ried-Brig, in Canton Valais
- Ried-Mörel, Östlich Raron, Canton Valais
- Riederalp, in Canton Valais
- Essert, Switzerland, Sarine District, Canton Fribourg
- Ried-Muotathal, in Canton Schwyz

== Other uses ==
- SV Ried, an Austrian football club
- Treaty of Ried, signed in October 1813 during the Napoleonic Wars

== See also ==
- Reid (disambiguation)
- Reidy
