= Michael Reed =

Michael or Mike Reed may refer to:

== Science ==
- Michael C. Reed (born 1942), American mathematician
- Mike Reed (biochemist) (1944–2009), British biochemist
- G. Mike Reed, American computer scientist

== Sports ==
- Mike Reed (American football coach) (born 1972), American football player and coach
- Mike Reed (fullback) (1975–2014), American football player
- Michael Reed (soccer) (born 1987), American soccer player
- Mike Reed (cricketer) (born 1988), English cricketer
- Michael Reed (baseball) (born 1992), American baseball outfielder
- Mike Reed (boxer) (born 1993), American boxer

== Others ==
- Michael Reed (cinematographer) (1929–2022), British cinematographer
- Mike Reed (politician) (1945–2020), Australian politician
- Mike Reed (musician) (born 1974), American jazz drummer, bandleader, composer and music presenter

== See also ==
- Michael Reid (disambiguation)
- Michael Read (born 1941), English swimmer
- Mike Read (born 1947), British DJ
- Michael Reade (1965/66–2024), Irish broadcaster and journalist
- Michael Redd (born 1979), American basketball player
