= Ready (surname) =

Ready is a surname. Notable people with the surname include:

- Charles Ready (1802–1878), American politician from Tennessee; U.S. representative 1853–59
- Gene Ready (1941–2015), American politician and businessman
- John Ready (1777–1845), British army officer and politician
- Justin Ready (born 1982), American politician
- Karl Ready (born 1972), Welsh professional football player
- Paul Ready (born 1977), British actor
- Randy Ready (born 1960), American professional baseball player
- Rudolph Ready (1878–1958), Australian politician
- Ryan Ready (born 1978), Canadian professional ice hockey player
- Stephanie Ready (born 1975), American sports reporter and basketball coach
- Troy Ready (born 1980), American soccer player

== See also ==
- Reddy (Irish surname)
- Reedy (disambiguation)
- Reidy
