= Reedy Creek =

Reedy Creek may refer to several places:

== Places ==
=== Australia ===
- Reedy Creek, Queensland, a suburb of the Gold Coast
  - Reedy Creek Observatory, an observatory located in the above community
  - Reedy Creek Reserve, a nature reserve in Queensland
- Reedy Creek, South Australia, a locality
- Reedy Creek Conservation Park, a protected area
- Reedy Creek, Victoria, a locality
- Batlow, New South Wales, a town formerly named Reedy Creek

=== United States ===
- Lake Buena Vista, Florida, formerly called the City of Reedy Creek
  - Reedy Creek Improvement District, Florida
  - Lower Reedy Creek Management Area

== Watercourses ==
- Reedy Creek (Blacktown, Sydney), a tributary of the Eastern Creek in the Blacktown local government area of New South Wales, Australia
- Reedy Creek (Crabtree Creek tributary), a stream in North Carolina
- Reedy Creek (West Virginia), a stream
- Reedy Creek (Dan River tributary), a stream in Halifax County, Virginia

== See also ==
- Reedy (disambiguation)
