= Matthew Read =

Matthew Read may refer to:

- Matt Read, Canadian ice hockey player
- Matthew Read (chess boxer)
- Matthew Read (screenwriter) and producer

== See also ==
- Matthew Reed (disambiguation)
- Matthew Reid (disambiguation)
- Matt Rhead, English footballer
