= Gordon Reid =

Gordon Reid may refer to:

- Gordon McGregor Reid (born 1948), director general and chief executive of The North of England Zoological Society
- Gordon Reid (actor) (1939–2003), Scottish actor
- Gordon Reid (businessman) (1933–2023), Canadian businessman
- Gordon Reid (governor) (1923–1989), governor of Western Australia
- Gordon Reid (politician) (born 1992), member of the Australian House of Representatives
- Gordon Reid (priest) (1943–2025), Anglican priest, former Dean of Gibraltar and Vicar General of the Diocese of Europe
- Gordon Reid (tennis) (born 1991), British wheelchair tennis player
- Gordon Reid (rugby union) (born 1987), Scottish rugby union player
- Gordon Reid (footballer) (1947–2010), Australian footballer for Geelong
- Gord Reid (Gordon Joseph Reid, 1910–1994), Canadian ice hockey player

== Other uses ==
- CCGS Gordon Reid, a 1990 vessel in the Canadian Coast Guard

== See also ==
- Gordon Reed (1913–1978), English footballer
- Annette Gordon-Reed, author
