= Reddy (disambiguation) =

Reddy is a Telugu Hindu caste in India.

Reddy or Reddi may also refer to:

== People ==
- Reddy (surname), a Telugu surname
- Reddy (Irish surname)
- Reddy (nickname)
- Reddy (rapper), stage name of South Korean rapper and singer Kim Hong-woo (born 1985)

== Fictional characters ==
- R. U. Reddy (Winthrop Roan Jr.), a mutant in the Marvel Universe
- Reddy Kilowatt, a branding character for electricity generation company in the United States

== Other uses ==
- Reddi Kingdom, a 14th- and 15th-century dynasty in southern India
- Reddi (band), a Danish band
- Reddy (album), a 1979 album by Helen Reddy
- Reddy (title), a title given to village headman
