= Scott Reed =

Scott Reed or Read may refer to:

- Scott Elgin Reed (1921–1994), United States federal judge
- Scott Reed (comics) (born 1970), American illustrator, comic book artist and author

== See also ==
- Scott Reid (disambiguation)
