= Reddy (Irish surname) =

Origin
- Origin: Gaelic
- Meaning: Descendant of Rodach
- Region of origin: Ireland

Other names
- Variant form: Ó Rodaigh

Reddy is a surname of Irish origin, derived from the Gaelic Ó Rodaigh, a patronymic name meaning descendant of Rodach.

== Notable people ==
- Ailbhe Reddy (born 1991), folk singer
- Bianca Reddy (born 1982), Australian netball player
- Helen Reddy (1941–2020), Australian-American singer and activist of Irish ancestry
- Joel Reddy (born 1985), Australian rugby league footballer
- Liam Reddy (born 1981), Australian footballer
- Michael Reddy (born 1980), Irish footballer
- Michael Reddy (died 1919), Irish politician
- Patsy Reddy (born 1954), Governor General of New Zealand
- Rod Reddy (born 1954), Australian rugby league footballer and coach

== See also ==
- Reddy (disambiguation)
- Ready (surname)
