= Matthew Reed (disambiguation) =

Matthew Reed, gridiron football player

Matthew Reed may also refer to:

- Matt Reed (footballer), former goalkeeper in the English Football League
- Matt Reed, triathlete
- Matthew Reed (soccer) for Nashville Metros
- Matthew Reed (sport shooter), see Shooting at the 2011 Island Games

== See also ==
- Matthew Reid (disambiguation)
- Matthew Read (disambiguation)
