= Reedy =

Reedy may refer to:

== Artifact ==
- Reedy Point Bridge in Delaware

== People ==
- Chuck Reedy, a former American football player and coach
- Edward K. Reedy, a director of the Georgia Tech Research Institute
- George Reedy, White House Press Secretary
- Hanara Tangiawha Te Ohaki Reedy, a New Zealand tribal leader
- Jamil El Reedy, a retired Egypt ian alpine skier
- Materoa Reedy, a New Zealand tribal leader
- Paul Reedy, an Australian rower
- Thomas E. Reedy, a politician from South Dakota
- Thomas Reedy, convicted child pornography trafficker. See Operation Avalanche (child pornography crackdown)
- William Marion Reedy, a St. Louis-based editor
- Winston Reedy, Reggae singer

== Places ==
Antarctica

- Reedy Glacier

Australia

- Reedy Lake, Victoria
- Reedy, Western Australia

United States

- Reedy, West Virginia
- Reedy Island, Delaware
- Reedy River, South Carolina

== See also ==
- Reedy Creek (disambiguation)
- Reidy
