= Patrick Reid =

Patrick Reid may refer to:

- Patrick Reid (Medal of Honor) (1875–1924), United States sailor
- T. Patrick Reid (born 1943), Canadian politician
- Pat Reid (1910–1990), World War II British escape officer; postwar attaché, civil engineer and author
- Pat Reid (Canadian football), Canadian football player
- Paddy Reid (1924–2016), Irish dual code rugby player
- Patrick Reed (born 1990), American golfer
- Patrick Read (1899–1947), Irish anarchist
- Patrick Reade, British doctor, illustrator and journalist
