= Mike Reid =

Michael Reid or Mike Reid may refer to:

== Sportsmen ==
- Mike Reid (golfer) (born 1954), American golfer
- Mike Reid (defensive back) (born 1970), American football player for the Philadelphia Eagles
- Mike Reid (rugby union) (born 1985), New Zealand rugby union player
- Michael Reid (boxer) (born 1938), Irish Olympic boxer
- Michael Reid (linebacker) (born 1964), American football linebacker
- Michael Reid (rugby league), Australian, active in the 1980s

== Actors ==
- Mikey Reid (born 1992), American child actor
- Mike Reid (actor) (1940–2007), English comedian and actor, best known for his role as Frank Butcher in the BBC soap opera EastEnders

== Others ==
- Mike Reid (singer) (born 1947), singer, songwriter and composer, also retired American football player (early 1970s)
- Michael Reid (evangelist) (1943–2023), English Christian evangelist
- Michael Reid (journalist) (born 1952), English journalist, writer and commentator on Latin American and Iberian affairs
- Michael Reid (politician) (born 1954), American politician in Missouri
- Mike Reid (chef) (born 1982), British chef and co-host of Australian cooking television series

== See also ==
- Mike Read (born 1947), English broadcaster
- Michael Read (born 1941), English swimmer
- Michael Reed (disambiguation)
