= Andrew Reed =

Andrew Reed may refer to:

== Sports ==
- Andrew Reed (baseball), American baseball third baseman
- Andrew Joseph Reed or A. J. Reed (born 1993), American baseball first baseman
- Andrew Reed (rower) (born 1991), American rower
- Andy Reed (rugby union) (born 1969), former Cornish rugby union player who played for Scotland

== Others ==
- Andrew Reed (minister) (1787–1862), British Congregational minister and philanthropist
- Andrew Reed (police officer) (1837–1914), inspector in the Irish policeforce
- Andy Reed (politician) (born 1964), former British MP

== See also ==
- Andrew F. Read, biologist
- Andy Reid (disambiguation)
