= Bruce Reed =

Bruce Reed may refer to:

- Bruce Reed (political operative) (born 1960), American political adviser
- Bruce Reed (mathematician), Canadian mathematician and computer scientist
- Bruce Reed (actor) (1943–1998), American film and television actor
- Bruce Reed (wrestler) or Butch Reed (1954–2021), American professional wrestler

== See also ==
- Bruce Reid (disambiguation)
