= Rick Reed =

Rick Reed may refer to:

- Rick Reed (advertising agent) (1953–2022), Republican advertising agent
- Rick Reed (umpire) (1950–2020), umpire in Major League Baseball
- Rick Reed (pitcher) (born 1964), former pitcher in Major League Baseball

== See also ==
- Richard Reed (born 1973), British businessman
- Richard Reid (disambiguation)
- Richard Read (born 1957), American journalist
