= Reidy =

Reidy may refer to:

- Affonso Eduardo Reidy (1909–1964), Brazilian architect
- Bill Reidy (1873–1915), American basketball player
- Brendan Reidy (born 1968), New Zealand-Samoan rugby player
- Brian Reidy (1939–2016), New Zealand rugby player
- Carolyn Reidy (1949–2020), American publisher
- Denis Reidy, Irish football player
- Ger Reidy (Gaelic footballer) (born 1986), Irish football player
- James Reidy (1890–1963), Irish politician
- John Reidy (1875–1910), Irish hurler
- Liam Reidy (hurler) (1924–2007), Irish hurler
- Mary Reidy (1880–1977), New Zealand nurse
- Mike Reidy (born 1991), American soccer player
- Norm Reidy (1924–2002), Australian football player
- Pádraig Reidy (born 1986), Irish football player
- Peter Reidy (c.1874–1932), Australian politician
- Ray Reidy (1937–2015), Irish hurler
- Sean Reidy (born 1989), New Zealand rugby player

== See also ==
- Reid
- Riedy
- Reedy (disambiguation)
- Ready (surname)
