= Thomas E. Reedy =

American politician

Thomas E. Reedy was an American politician who served as a member of the South Dakota House of Representatives.

Thomas Reedy was born in Mendota, Illinois on July 11, 1868. In March 1883, he moved to Dakota Territory. After attending South Dakota State College in Brookings, South Dakota, Reedy raised livestock and farmed. He was also involved in real estate in Yankton, South Dakota.

From 1906 to 1908, Thomas Reedy served as mayor of Yankton, South Dakota. For eleven years, he also served as the city assessor. From 1935 to 1936, Reedy represented Yankton County, South Dakota in the South Dakota House of Representatives.

He died on January 20, 1948.
