= Marion Reid (scientist) =

British immunohematologist (born 1944)

Marion Elizabeth Reid (born 1944) is a British scientist specialising in immunohematology and author based in Bristol. She has worked in both the United Kingdom and the United States.

== Early life and education ==
Reid was born in Winchester, England. At age 10, she was told she was "incapable of being taught" and "would have a hard time holding a job".

Reid trained as a medical technologist at the North East Blood Metropolitan Transfusion Service in Brentwood before earning her PhD in biochemistry from the CNAA in Bristol. She qualified as a Fellow of the Institute of Medical Laboratory Technology, now the Institute of Biomedical Science. She holds a Master of Science (MSc) in clinical science from San Francisco State University.

== Career ==
Reid directed the Laboratory of Immunohematology at the New York Blood Center, where she led the transition from serologic methods for characterizing red cell antigens and antibodies to a combination of serology and DNA-based genotyping of blood group antigens. She published hundreds of articles and was described by reviewers as a "scientist and world-renowned immunohematologist". Her laboratory identified novel blood group antigens and alleles in several different ethnic groups. She holds a patent for a DNA-based method to identify compatible donors for patients requiring blood transfusions.

== Personal life ==
Reid lives in Clifton, Bristol.

Reid's retirement hobby of green woodworking makes her a bodger. In 2020 she was president of Bristol Soroptimist International, and published 100 Years of Sisterhood: Bristol Fashion.

== Select publications ==
- Bloody Brilliant! A History of Blood Groups and Blood Groupers (with Steven R. Pierce), AABB Press, 2016. ISBN 9781563959103
- The Blood Group Antigen Factsbook, 3rd ed., Academic Press, 2012. ISBN 9780240821306
- The Discovery and Significance of the Blood Groups (with Ian Shine), SBB Books, 2012 ISBN 978-1-59572-422-9

=== Non-scientific ===
- Reid, Marion E. (2020). 100 Years of Sisterhood: Bristol Fashion. Redcliffe Press Limited. ISBN 978-1-911408-73-4.

== Awards ==
- AABB's Bernard Fantus Lifetime Achievement Medal, 2024
- James Blundell Award, British Blood Transfusion Society, 2014
- AABB's Emily Cooley Memorial Award, 2012
- Honorary Doctor of Science, University of Plymouth, 2011
- International Woman in Transfusion Award, 2006
