= Margaret Reid =

Margaret Reid may refer to:

- Margaret Reid (minister) (1923–2018), New Zealand Presbyterian minister
- Margaret Reid (politician) (born 1935), Australian politician
- Margaret Reid (scientist), Australian physicist
- Margaret G. Reid (1896–1991), Canadian economist
- Margaret Reid (intelligence officer), British Hero of the Holocaust

== See also ==
- Margaret Read (disambiguation)
