= Andy Reid (Scottish footballer) =

Scottish footballer

Personal information
- Full name: Andrew Reid
- Place of birth: Aberdeen, Scotland
- Position: Full back

Senior career*
Years	Team	Apps	(Gls)
- Bo'ness
1927–1928	Burnley	3	(0)
1928–1930	Bradford Park Avenue	12	(0)
1930–1931	Reading	0	(0)
- Burton Town
- * Club domestic league appearances and goals

Andrew Reid was a Scottish professional footballer who played as a full back. He played a total of twelve games in the Football League for Burnley and Bradford Park Avenue.
