= Douglas Miller Reid =

Douglas Miller Reid FRSE FLS FZS (1897–1959) was a 20th-century Scottish schoolmaster and noted amateur botanist and botanical author.

== Life ==
He was born in Motherwell on 25 November 1897 and educated at Motherwell Academy.

In 1918, aged only 21, he became a Member of the Linnean Society of London, later being elected a Fellow (FLS). From 1921 until 1953 he was Biology Master of Harrow School. He was also Curator of the Butler Museum.

In 1942 he was elected a Fellow of the Royal Society of Edinburgh. His proposers were Edward Hindle, Alexander Condie Stephen, Edward Wyllie Fenton and John Berry.

He died suddenly on 4 September 1959 at his home, House of Stoer near Lairg in Sutherland in northern Scotland.

== Publications ==
- Animal Classification and Distribution (1925)
- Introduction to Biology
- Botany for the Gardener (1966)
