= Richard Reid (disambiguation) =

Richard Reid (born 1973) is a British convicted terrorist who attempted to detonate a shoe bomb.

Richard Reid may also refer to:

- Richard Reid (architect) (born 1939), English architect
- Richard Reid (cricketer) (born 1958), New Zealand cricketer
- Richard Gavin Reid (1879–1980), Canadian politician
- Richard Reid (Northern Ireland politician), Northern Irish politician for Mid Ulster
- Richard Reid (actor) (born 1984), British actor
- Richard Reid (entertainment reporter) (born 1968), American-Australian entertainment reporter and winner of I'm a Celebrity...Get Me Out of Here! (Australia season 5)
- Ric Reid (born 1969), New Zealand cyclist
- Richie Reid (born 1956), Irish hurler
- Richie Reid (hurler, born 1993), Irish hurler

== See also ==
- Richard Read (born 1957), American journalist
- Richard Read Sr. (c. 1765–c. 1829), British-born artist sent to Australia as a convict
- Richard Reed (born 1973), British businessman
- Richard F. Reed (1861–1926), justice of the Supreme Court of Mississippi
- Rick Reed (disambiguation)
- Richard Reade, English judge
- Richard Rede (died 1416), Irish statesman
- Reed Richards, also known as Mr. Fantastic, a fictional superhero
