= Margaret Read (architect) =

American architect

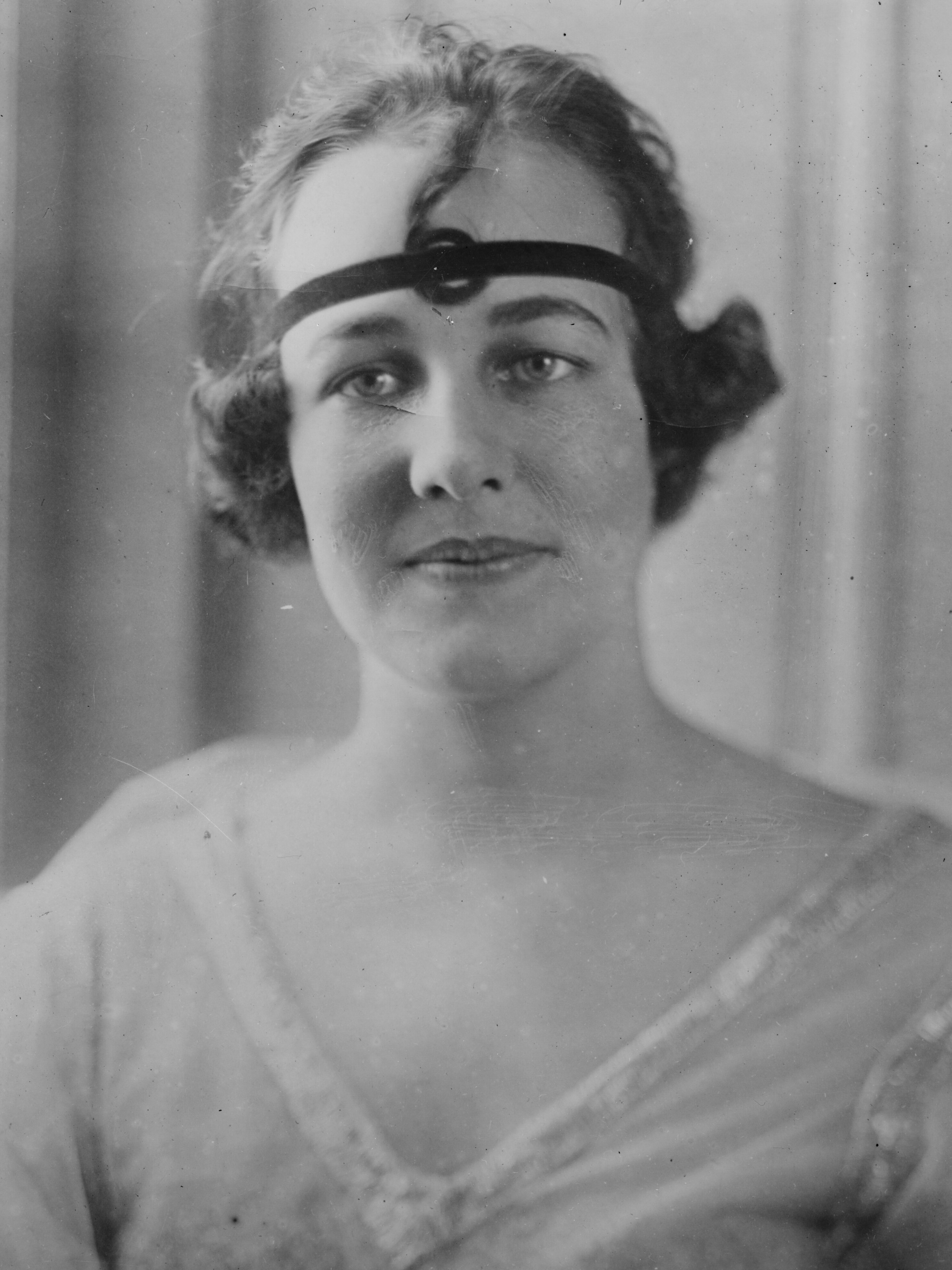
- Born: 1892; Iowa
- Died: 1982 (aged 89–90)
- Occupation: Architect
- Known for: First female architect in Boulder, CO.

Margaret Read (1892–1982) was the first female architect in Boulder, Colorado. Born in Iowa, she relocated with her parents to Boulder in 1910. After attending the University of Boulder for two years, she transferred to the University of California at Berkeley in the architecture program, where she was one of five women in the class. Upon returning to Boulder, she was hired by the offices of Glen H. Huntington in 1926. Huntington's was Boulder's sole architectural firm at that time In 1929, Read designed the noted Gothic Revival Trinity Lutheran Church at 2200 Broadway in Boulder, which received landmark status in January 2016 As a result of the post-World War I housing boom, Huntington's office was busily involved in building homes in the University Hill area of Boulder and it was there that Read designed her own Mediterranean Revival home at 740 13th Street, where she lived with her father. In the 1930s, Read served on Boulder's city planning and parks commission.

In the summer of 1960, Read, then a member of the architectural drafting department at the University of Colorado in Boulder, worked for the modernist architect Robert "Rob" Oliver Roy. Read taught drafting to women at Lowry Field during World War II. Later in her career, she remodeled Bob Hope’s Beverly Hills house
