= Doug Reid (cricketer) =

New Zealand cricketer (1928–2025)

Personal information
- Full name: Douglas James Reid
- Born: 17 October 1928; Christchurch, New Zealand
- Died: 18 December 2025 (aged 97); Christchurch, New Zealand
- Batting: Right-handed
- Bowling: Left-arm medium-pace

Domestic team information
- Years: Team
- 1953–54 to 1956–57: Canterbury

Career statistics
Competition	First-class
Matches	7
Runs scored	28
Batting average	5.60
100s/50s	0/0
Top score	16
Balls bowled	1218
Wickets	18
Bowling average	25.16
5 wickets in innings	0
10 wickets in match	0
Best bowling	4/58
Catches/stumpings	0/–
- Source: Cricinfo, 6 February 2018

Douglas James Reid (17 October 1928 – 18 December 2025) was a New Zealand cricketer who played seven matches of first-class cricket for Canterbury from 1953 to 1957.

Reid was born in Christchurch and educated at Christchurch Boys' High School. He became a quantity surveyor.

A left-arm opening bowler, Reid's best first-class figures were 4 for 58 against Otago in the 1953–54 Plunket Shield.

Reid and his wife Toni Reid (the daughter of the All Black Read Masters) both represented Canterbury in cricket in the 1950s. They married in Merivale, Christchurch, in February 1954.

On the death of Bill Crump on 10 July 2022, Reid became the oldest living New Zealand first-class cricketer. He died aged 97 in December 2025.
