= Lydia Reid (activist) =

Scottish activist (died 2023)

Lydia Ann Reid (c. 1949 – June 2023) was a Scottish activist. She advocated the cause of parents who lost a child as an infant, and may have had their child's remains inappropriately used for research, or disposed of, and without consent.

== Birth and death of her son ==
At age 26, Reid gave birth to her a premature son, Gary Robert Paton, by Cesarean section, on 26 June 1975. When he was six days old, he was transferred to the Royal Hospital for Sick Children ("Sick Kids") in Edinburgh for surgery to remove a catheter. The baby was placed on life support after surgery on 2 July, with reported brain damage. His mother agreed to a request by medical staff to terminate life support. He was briefly returned to life support by the hospital, but the hospital sent police to inform them that night that the child had died.

A local funeral service showed her the child before burial, but she claimed that the child they showed her was not her baby; Gary was smaller and had different hair colouring. The funeral staff denied this and argued that she was confused by postnatal depression. Reid would spend over 40 years investigating what happened to her child, publicly exposing the practice of hospitals in such situations.

== Advocacy and reform ==
In 1999, a scandal erupted, and it was revealed that hospitals frequently took organs or other tissue samples from dead babies for research without parental consent. It was estimated that the organs or bodies of over 100,000 foetuses and stillbirths were being stored in medical labs, many either without any consent, or consent obtained in a way that rendered the parent unable to make an informed decision. Particularly intense scrutiny of Alder Hey hospital led to its chief pathologist being stripped of his license to practice medicine.

News of the scandal prompted Reid to check with Sick Kids Hospital. She obtained medical records showing that his organs had been removed, despite assurances from the hospital to the contrary. Reid formed a network with other parents, called Justice For The Innocents. Many of its members' requests for their children's medical records were responded to with redacted documents or none. Her efforts led authorities to form a review group. Its McLaren Report concluded that there were about 6,000 organs still being held, and that tighter regulations of the industry were needed. The parents sued for return of the organs. Many parents were successful (though sometimes it took as many as four separate returns), but not Reid, as the hospital insisted that none of the organs were stored. Reid fought for payment for second funerals.

=== Later developments ===
Eventually, Reid obtained a court order to exhume her son's body. Dame Professor Sue Black performed the exhumation; she verified that it was the correct grave through artefacts found in it, but concluded that no body had been buried there. As of 2018, Reid continued to press for information about her son and to get his organs returned to her for burial.

In March 2023, it was announced that Reid was terminally ill with bowel cancer. She died in Edinburgh June 2023, at the age of 74.
