= Reddy (nickname) =

Reddy is the nickname of:

- Reddy Foster (1864–1908), American baseball player
- Reddy Grey (1875–1934), American baseball player
- Reddy Mack (1866–1916), American baseball player
- Reddy Row (fl. early 1800s), Indian administrator
- Reddy Rowe (1887–1966), American college football coach
- Reddy Steward (born 2001), American football player
