= Andrew Read =

British medical geneticist

Professor Andrew Read FRCPath FMedSci
- Born: 1939 (age 86–87)
- Education: University of Cambridge
- Occupation: Medical geneticist
- Employers: Max Planck Institute for Medical Research; University of Warwick; University of Manchester
- Website: www.manchester.ac.uk/research/andrew.read/

Andrew P. Read (born 1939) is a British medical geneticist.

Read studied organic chemistry at the University of Cambridge. Once he had obtained his doctorate, he worked at the Max Planck Institute for Medical Research and at the University of Warwick.

In 1967 he obtained a post at the University of Manchester, moving to its Medical Genetics Department in 1977. His research subjects included neural tube defects and the genes involved in hereditary deafness. he became Emeritus upon formal retirement.

He served as chair of the Clinical Molecular Genetics Society and was founder chair of the British Society for Human Genetics from 1996 to 2000.

He is a Fellow of the Royal College of Pathologists (FRCPath) and a Fellow of the Academy of Medical Sciences (FMedSci).
