= Pat Reid (Canadian football) =

Canadian football player

Profile
- Position: End

Personal information
- Listed weight: 180 lb (82 kg)

Career history
- 1945–1948: Toronto Argonauts

Awards and highlights
- Grey Cup champion (1945, 1946, 1947)

Percy "Pat" Reid was a Canadian football player who played for the Toronto Argonauts. He won the Grey Cup with them in 1945, 1946 and 1947.
