= Ruth Reid =

Ruth Reid may refer to:

- Ruth Reid (actress), American actress, played Betty Grissom in 1998 HBO docudrama TV miniseries From the Earth to the Moon
- Ruth Reid (author), American author of romance fiction
- Ruth Reid (community worker) (1921–2024), Australian community worker, wife of the Governor of Western Australia Gordon Reid
- Ruth Reid (principal), American school principal, first principal of Reid School in Bend, Oregon
- Ruth Reid (producer), British film and television producer, working for Danish company Miso Film
- Ruth Reid, wife of Ptolemy Reid, Prime Minister of Guyana from 1980 to 1984
- Ruth Reed, British architect
