= Richard Michell =

English churchman and academic (1805-1877)

Richard Michell (1805–1877) was an English churchman and academic, the first principal of the second foundation of Hertford College, Oxford.

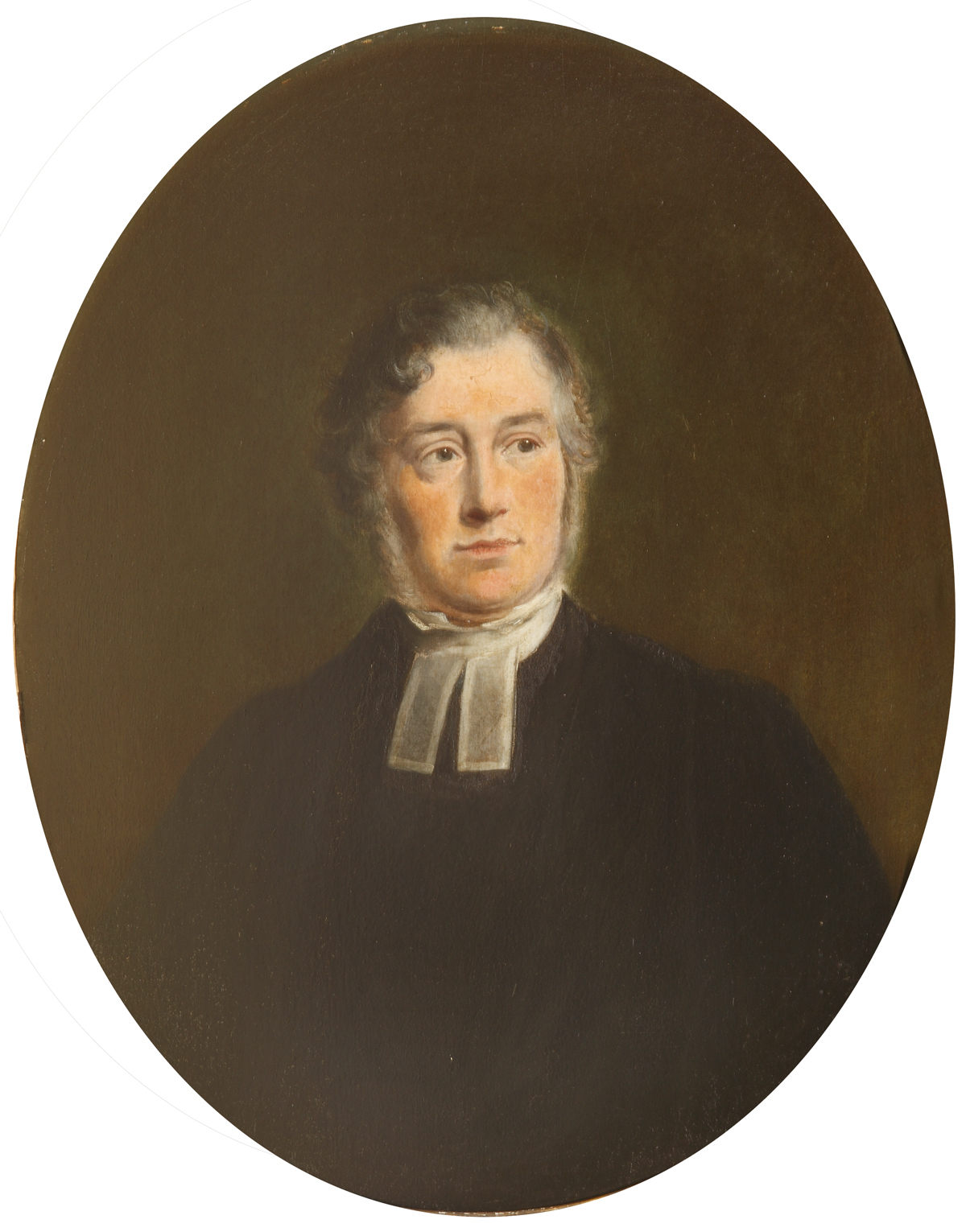
Richard Michell

== Life ==
The third son of Edward Michell of Bruton and Ann Clements of Wyke Champflower, in Somerset, he was born at Bruton. Educated at Bruton grammar school, he went in 1820 to Wadham College, Oxford, where his uncle, Dr. Richard Michell (1766-1826), was a Fellow. Obtaining a first-class in literae humaniores (B.A. 1824, M.A. 1827, B.D. 1836, and D.D. 1868), Michell became a successful private tutor.

At the age of 24 Michell was appointed examiner in the school of literae humaniores, and was elected in 1830 Fellow of Lincoln College, where he acted as bursar in 1832, and as tutor from 1834 to 1848. In 1839 he was elected in convocation the first prælector of logic, a post he held for ten years. In 1849 he delivered the Bampton lectures, on The Nature and Comparative Value of the Christian Evidences. In 1849 also, Michell was appointed public orator of the university, and he retained that office till his death.

In 1856 Michell became rector of South Moreton, Berkshire, but did not reside there. On the formation of the new hebdomadal council under the act for reforming the university in 1854, Michell was elected to a seat, and retained it by till 1872. In 1848 he became vice-principal of Magdalen Hall, now Hertford College, of which John David Macbride was then Principal; he succeeded William Jacobson. In 1868 Michell succeeded Macbride in the principalship, and he then began to agitate for the conversion of the small hall into a college. The plan took shape in 1873, and was approved by convocation. T. C. Baring endowed the college with a large number of fellowships and scholarships, mostly limited to members of the church of England. The new foundation took the name Hertford College, used by the former foundation on the site. Michell became the first principal of the new foundation of the college in 1874, and died 29 March 1877.

== Works ==
Michell's Oxford orations delivered at the annual act or encaenia, alternately with the professor of poetry, were published in 1878 by his eldest son, Edward Blair Michell, with notes. They form a sort of running commentary on the history of the university for nearly 30 years.

== Family ==
In 1841 Michell married Amelia, daughter of Thomas Blair of Walton Grove, Surrey, by whom he had several children.

Children of Rev. Richard Michell & Amelia Blair

1. Edward Blair Michell M.A. (1843-1926)
2. Eliza Maria Michell (Hoskins) (1844-1918)
3. Richard Brooke Michel B.A. (1845-1915)
4. Rowland Lyons Norsworthy Michell C.M.G. B.A. (1847-1931)
5. Mary Caroline Michell (Blair/Sutherland-Leveson-Gower/Rollit) (1848-1912)
6. Herbert William Creswell Michell (1851-1909)
7. Arthur Tompson Michell M.A. (1852-1923)
8. Walter Gordon Mitchell M.A. (1854-1925)
