= Gordon Reid (footballer) =

Australian rules footballer

Personal information
- Full name: Gordon Reid
- Born: 29 October 1947
- Died: 3 May 2010 (aged 62)
- Original team: Lang Lang
- Height: 178 cm (5 ft 10 in)
- Weight: 77 kg (170 lb)
- Position: Halfback

Playing career^{1}
Years	Club	Games (Goals)
1965–67, 1969–72	Geelong	56 (0)
- ^{1} Playing statistics correct to the end of 1972.

Gordon Reid (29 October 1947 – 3 May 2010) was a former Australian rules footballer who played with Geelong in the Victorian Football League (VFL).
