= Tim Reid (disambiguation) =

Tim Reid may refer to:

- Tim Reid (born 1944), American actor
- Tim Reid (comedy writer), British comedy writer
- Tim Reid (politician) (1936–2025), Canadian politician

== See also ==
- Tim Read (1962–2026), Australian politician
- Tim Reed (born 1965), South Dakota politician
- Timothy Reed (born 1985), Australian triathlete
- Timothy Read (fl. 1626–1647), English actor
