= Nicholas Reid =

Nicholas Reid or similar may refer to:

== Read ==
- Nicholas Read (born 1958), British-American physicist
- Nicholas Read (sculptor) (c.1733–1787), English sculptor
- Nick Read (Nicholas Jonathan Read; born 1964), British businessman, former CEO of Vodafone Group
- Nick Read (Post Office CEO) (Nicholas James Read; born 1966), British businessman, former CEO of Post Office Limited

== Reade ==
- Nicholas Reade (born 1946), British Anglican priest, Bishop of Blackburn 2004–2012

== Reed ==
- Nicholas Reed (born 1963), British documentary film producer, media, entertainment and technology entrepreneur
- Nick Reed (born 1987), American football defensive end

== Reid ==
- Nic Reid (born 1995), Australian rules footballer
- Nick Reid (born 1983), American football linebacker
- Nicky Reid (born 1960), English football defender
- Nicholas Bruce Reid (politician) (1935–2020), Australian politician
