= Michael Reid (politician) =

American politician (born 1954)

Michael J. Reid (born November 26, 1954, in St. Louis) is an American politician who served as a Missouri state senator and Missouri state representative. He was elected as a Republican. Reid attended the University of Missouri and the University of Missouri–St. Louis.
