= Scott Reid =

Scott Reid may refer to:

- Scott Reid (politician) (born 1964), Conservative Party of Canada MP
- Scott Reid (political advisor), advisor to former Canadian Prime Minister Paul Martin
- Scott Reid (Newfoundland and Labrador politician), MHA in Newfoundland and Labrador
- Scott Reid (baseball) (1947–2021), American baseball player and scout
- Scott Reid (ice hockey) (born 1976), Canadian hockey goalie from the Central Hockey League
- Scott Reid (actor), Scottish actor

== See also ==
- Scott Reed (disambiguation)
