= Matthew Reid =

Matthew Reid may refer to:

- Matthew Reid (politician) (1856–1947), Australian senator and member of the Queensland Legislative Assembly
- Matt Reid (tennis) (born 1990), Australian tennis player
- Matt Reid (baseball) (born 1978), American college baseball coach
- Quintin Jardine (born 1945), author, who uses the pen-name Matthew Reid
- Matt Reid (rugby league), player for North Wales Crusaders

== See also ==
- Matthew Reed (disambiguation)
- Matthew Read (disambiguation)
- Matt Rhead (born 1984), English footballer
