= Bruce Reid (disambiguation) =

Bruce Reid (born 1963) is a former Australian Test cricketer

Bruce Reid may also refer to:

- Bruce Reid (politician) (1935–2020), Australian Liberal Party politician
- Bruce Reid Sr. (1929–1955), Footscray VFL footballer
- Bruce Reid Jr. (born 1955), Footscray and Carlton VFL footballer
- Bruce K. Reid (1950–1970), South Melbourne VFL footballer
- Bruce Reid (doctor) (1946–2020), Hawthorn VFL footballer and Essendon club doctor

== See also ==
- Bruce Reed (disambiguation)
