= Andrew Reid (lawyer) =

British lawyer and horse racing trainer

Andrew Stephen Reid (born 2 March 1954) is a British lawyer, horse racing trainer and former treasurer of the UK Independence Party.

== Legal career ==
He was educated at University College School and University College London (LLB). He was a founder of RMPI LLP (formerly Reid Minty) where he remains a senior partner. He has been a Deputy High Court Costs Judge (formerly Deputy Supreme Court Taxing Master) since 1991; a Deputy District Judge of the Principal Registry of the Family Division since 2001, and of the South Eastern Circuit since 2002, and Deputy Adjudicator of HM Land Registry since 2007. He is a Member of the Chartered Institute of Arbitrators. He acted for Lord McAlpine and won damages of £185,000 from the BBC and £125,000 from ITV in relation to false claims relating to child abuse.

== Horse racing ==
He has been a racehorse trainer and breeder since the late 1980s, based in Mill Hill, London, and has trained 179 winners as of October 2014.

== Farming ==
A farmer since 1981, he established Belmont Children's Farm, Mill Hill in 2009. In 2016 he bought a 345-acre Bishop's Court Farm in Oxfordshire and, in compliance with the requirements of the Footpaths Officer of the local council, started to put stock-proof fencing along the footpaths to separate and safeguard both walkers and animals. An application has been made to register part of the land as a village green by local residents who claim to have had access to parts of the land for over 20 years but this claim is contested and no decision has yet been reached.
