= Ross Reid =

Ross Reid may refer to:

- Ross Reid (cyclist) (born 1987), Welsh professional racing cyclist
- Ross Reid (politician) (born 1952), Canadian politician
- Ross T. Reid (1832–1915), pastoralist in South Australia and New South Wales
