= Margaret Read (musician) =

- Born: Margaret Ludwig; 27 March 1905; Aberdeen, Scotland
- Died: 10 March 1996 (aged 90) London, England
- Occupations: Musician, viola player, lecturer at the University of Edinburgh
- Spouse: Herbert Read

Margaret Read, (née Ludwig) (1905–1996) was a musician, a viola player, and a lecturer under Donald Francis Tovey at the University of Edinburgh.

== Life ==
Born in Aberdeen and originally of German lineage, via Scottish, Irish and Italian heritage, Read was one of eight siblings who all shared a passion for music. She graduated from the University of Edinburgh with a first class degree and furthered her studies in Cologne. While there she was impressed by Rhineland Catholicism and became a member of the Catholic Church on returning to Edinburgh.

After marrying poet and art critic Sir Herbert Read, she spent several years living in the south of England amongst poets and painters, later moving to rural North Yorkshire in 1949 with her husband and four children. Although somewhat isolated, she found consolation and made friends with several musical monks within the community of the Ampleforth Abbey.

She later established herself as a notable figure in the county, having persuaded her husband to accept a knighthood. Their family home, Stonegrave House, with its collection of art and antique furniture went on to become a cultural centre opened annually with admission funds going directly to the Red Cross.

After her husband died she stayed at Stonegrave until 1993, and then moved to a Catholic convent in London where she remained until her death in 1996.
