= Carbisdale Castle =

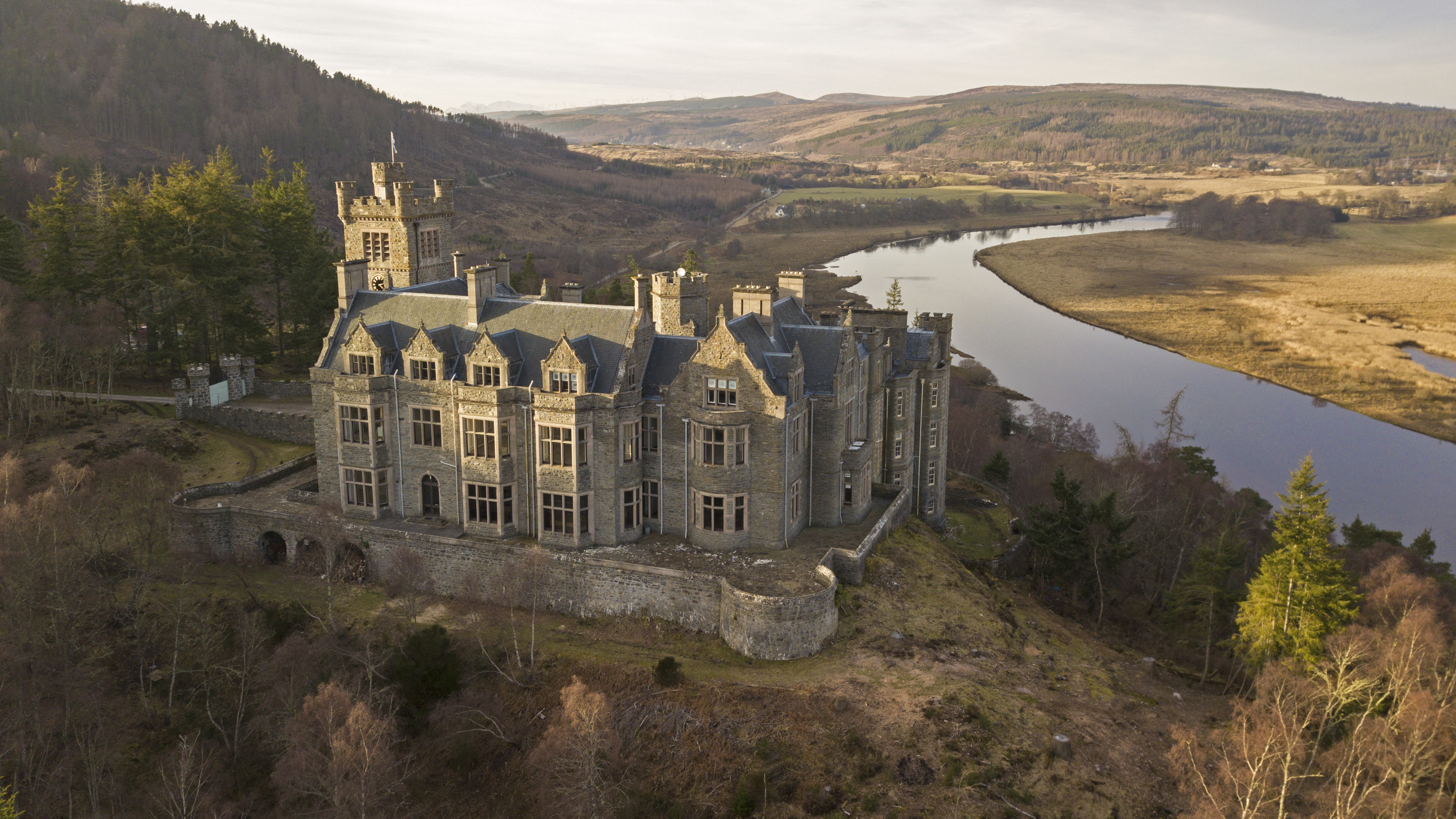
- Carbisdale Castle

- Location of Carbisdale Castle in Highland council area
- 57.9255°N 4.409°W
- Location: Kyle of Sutherland, Scottish Highlands
- OS grid reference: NH574954

History
- Built: 1905–1917
- Built for: Duchess of Sutherland

Site notes
- Architect: John Robertson
- Architectural style: Scottish Baronial

Listed Building – Category B
- Designated: 18 March 1971
- Reference no.: LB7165

Carbisdale Castle was built in 1907 for the Duchess of Sutherland on a hill across the Kyle of Sutherland from Invershin in the Scottish Highlands. From 1945 to 2011 it was used as a youth hostel, operated by the Scottish Youth Hostels Association. The castle is situated north of Culrain, and around 5 kilometres (3.1 mi) north-west of Bonar Bridge. It lies within the civil parish of Kincardine and Community council of Ardgay and District.

The castle is in the Scottish baronial style, it has 365 windows, is 41,433 square feet (3,849.3 m^{2}) and is protected as a category B listed building. The hostel closed for repair in 2011, and was put up for sale in 2014. Until its closure, the castle had a large collection of art, with some pieces dating back to 1680, as well as Italian marble statues. It was purchased in 2016 but offered for sale again in 2021; in 2022 it was again sold and is now a private residence. As of June 2025 it is again on the market.

== History ==
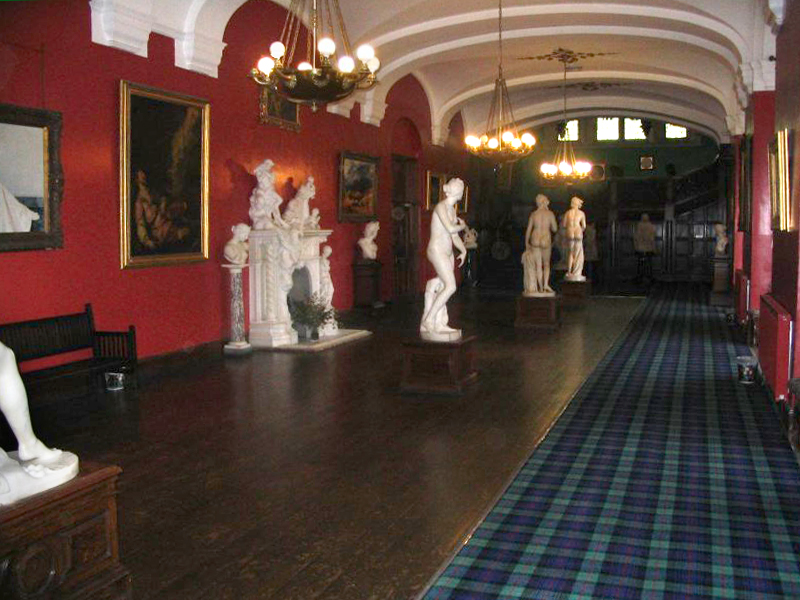
Lower Gallery in 2004; the sculpture collection has since been sold.

=== First owner ===
The castle was built between 1905 and 1917 for Mary Caroline, Duchess of Sutherland, the second wife of George Sutherland-Leveson-Gower, 3rd Duke of Sutherland, whom she married in 1889. She is better known as "Duchess Blair" because of her first marriage to Captain Arthur Kindersley Blair of the 71st Highland Light Infantry, who died in a hunting accident in 1883 near Pitlochry. The marriage was not well-liked in the Sutherland family. When the Duke died in 1892 his will, in favour of the Duchess, was contested by his son and heir Cromartie. In a court process that followed, the Duchess was found guilty of destroying documents and was imprisoned for six weeks in Holloway Prison.

Eventually, the Sutherland family came to an agreement giving Duchess Blair a substantial financial settlement. Furthermore, the family agreed to build a castle for the Duchess, as long as it was outside of the Sutherland lands. The Duchess employed a firm of Ayrshire builders and the castle was built between 1906 and 1917 just outside the Sutherland lands in Ross-shire. It was located on a hillside to be visible to a large part of Sutherland, especially the main road and rail line which the Sutherland family would have to use to travel south. Thus it became known as the "Castle of Spite" as it was widely considered that the Duchess located the castle there to spite her husband's family and the settlement agreement. The castle's tower only has clock faces on three of its four sides; the side facing Sutherland is blank, supposedly because the Duchess did not wish to give her former relatives the time of day.

=== World War II ===
Colonel Theodore Salvesen, a wealthy Scottish businessman of Norwegian extraction, bought the castle in 1933. He made it available as a refuge for King Haakon VII of Norway and Crown Prince Olav, who would later become King Olav V, during the Nazi occupation of Norway in World War II. During that time the castle was also used to hold important meetings; at the Carbisdale Conference on 22 June 1941 it was agreed that should Russian forces enter Norwegian territory, they would not stay there after the war. On 25 October 1944, the Red Army entered Norway and captured thirty towns, but the Russian forces later withdrew under the terms of the agreement.

=== Youth hostel ===
After the Colonel died his son, Captain Harold Salvesen, inherited the castle and gave its contents and estate to the Scottish Youth Hostels Association. Carbisdale Castle Youth Hostel opened to members on 2 June 1945. Following frost damage, the hostel closed for repairs in February 2011. Further structural damage was discovered during repair work. Because of the cost of completing the repairs, the SYHA advertised the castle for sale in 2014, for £1.2 million. In addition they auctioned 17 marble sculptures and 36 paintings in May 2015, raising a further £1 million.

=== Private residence ===
In September 2016, the castle was purchased by FCFM Group Ltd, who planned to make it "a world-class private residence".

The castle was put up for sale again in April 2021, priced at £1.5 million. It was sold in October 2022 to the barrister Samantha Kane and has since undergone restoration. Kane, now known as Lady Carbisdale, used the castle as her residence but intended to partially open it to the public. As of June 2025, it is again on the market, with a guide price of £3.5 million.

The castle is rumoured to be haunted by a ghost called Betty.
