= Catherine Reid =

New Zealand palaeontologist

Academic background
- Education: University of Auckland, University of Auckland, University of Tasmania
- Theses: The paleontology, paleoecology and stratigraphy of Lower Miocene sediments in the Waipatiki/Mangatuna area, Wairarapa, New Zealand (1996); The Permian bryozoa of Tasmania, New South Wales and southern Thailand: their taxonomy, biostratigraphy, palaeoecology and biogeography (2001)
- Doctoral advisor: Clive Burrett, Patrick Quilty

Academic work
- Institutions: University of Canterbury

Catherine Mary Reid is a New Zealand palaeontologist, and is a full professor at the University of Canterbury, specialising in palaeogeography of waterways and the evolution and ecology of bryozoans.

== Academic career ==
Reid earned a Master in Science at the University of Auckland in 1996, where she was awarded a Hastie Scholarship by the Geoscience Society of New Zealand. Reid then completed a PhD at the University of Tasmania on aquatic invertebrates called bryozoans in Tasmania, New South Wales and Southern Thailand, supervised by Clive Burrett and Pat Quilty. Reid joined the faculty of the University of Canterbury, rising to full professor in the School of Earth and Environment in 2024.

Reid is interested in the ecology and evolution of bryozoans, and how changes in ocean chemistry impact on them, and has researched these internationally. In New Zealand, she investigates the geological history of waterways and estuaries, using sedimentology and microfossils to investigate the human impacts on these areas. She is a member of the Waterways Centre, a joint research initiative between Lincoln University and the University of Canterbury to improve freshwater management.

Reid was an associate investigator on a 2021 funded Marsden grant titled Avian diversity in the aftermath of the Cretaceous-Paleogene (K/Pg) mass extinction: Zealandia as a hub for the evolution of marine birds, and led by Vanesa De Pietri at Canterbury. Reid was part of a team investigating ancient penguin fossils, including the recently discovered Kupoupou stilwelli.

In 2014 she served as secretary on the national committee of the Geoscience Society of New Zealand.

== Selected works ==
- Quigley, Mark Cameron; Hughes, Matthew; Bradley, Brendon; et al. (2016). "The 2010–2011 Canterbury Earthquake Sequence: Environmental effects, seismic triggering thresholds and geologic legacy". Tectonophysics. 672–673: 228–274. Bibcode:2016Tectp.672..228Q. doi:10.1016/j.tecto.2016.01.044. Wikidata Q57870952.
- Power, William L.; Clark, Kate; King, Darren Terrance Ngaru; et al. (2017). "Tsunami runup and tide-gauge observations from the 14 November 2016 M7.8 Kaikōura earthquake, New Zealand". Pure and Applied Geophysics. 174 (7): 2457–2473. doi:10.1007/s00024-017-1566-2. Wikidata Q105701017.
- Hayward, Bruce William; Grenfell, Hugh Rhys; Pullin, Annette D.; Reid, Catherine Mary; Hollis, Christopher John (1997). "Foraminiferal associations in the upper Waitemata Harbour, Auckland, New Zealand". Journal of the Royal Society of New Zealand. 27 (1): 21–51. doi:10.1080/03014223.1997.9517526. Wikidata Q59764452.
- Rogala, Barbara Krystyna; James, Noel Pattison; Reid, Catherine Mary (2007). "Deposition of Polar Carbonates During Interglacial Highstands on an Early Permian Shelf, Tasmania". Journal of Sedimentary Research. 77 (7): 587–606. doi:10.2110/jsr.2007.060. Wikidata Q70644584.
- Reid, Catherine Mary; Thompson, NK; Irvine, JRM; Laird, TE (2012). "Sand volcanoes in the Avon–Heathcote Estuary produced by the 2010–2011 Christchurch Earthquakes: implications for geological preservation and expression". New Zealand Journal of Geology and Geophysics. 55 (3): 249–254. doi:10.1080/00288306.2012.674051. Wikidata Q124409086.
- Reid, Catherine Mary; James, Noel Pattison; Beauchamp, Benoit; Kyser, Kurt (2007). "Faunal turnover and changing oceanography: Late Palaeozoic warm-to-cool water carbonates, Sverdrup Basin, Canadian Arctic Archipelago". Palaeogeography, Palaeoclimatology, Palaeoecology. 249 (1–2): 128–159. doi:10.1016/j.palaeo.2007.01.007. Wikidata Q124409087.
