= Mary Caroline Blair =

British duchess (1848–1912)

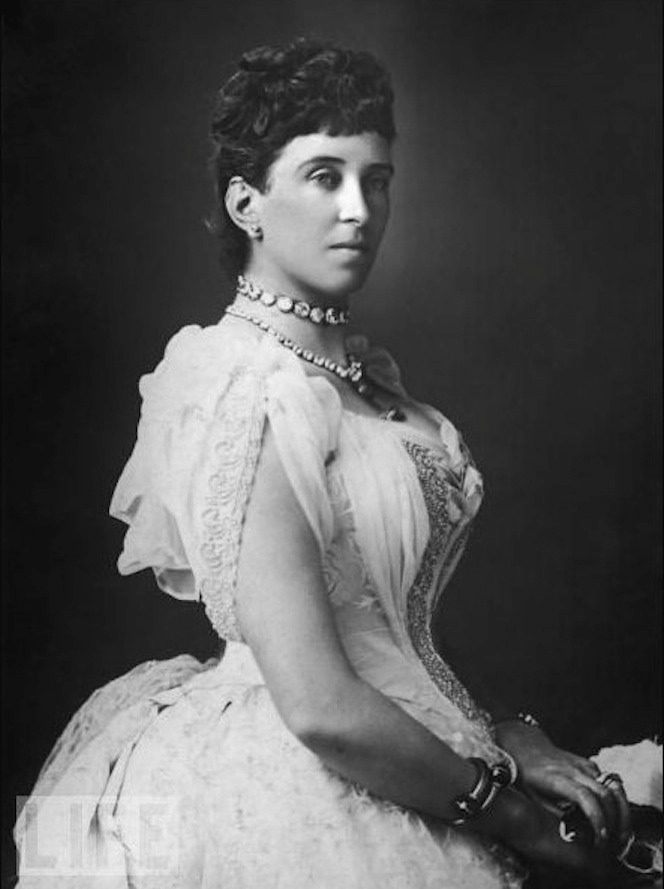
- The Duchess, c. 1890
- Born: Mary Caroline Michell; 1848; Oxford, England
- Died: 25 May 1912 (aged 63–64); London, England
- Other name: Duchess Blair
- Known for: Scandalous second marriage
- Spouses: Arthur Kindersley Blair (m. 1872; died 1883) George Sutherland-Leveson-Gower, 3rd Duke of Sutherland (m. 1889; died 1892) Sir Albert Rollit (m. 1896)
- Father: Richard Michell

Mary Caroline, Lady Rollit (née Michell; later 1848 – 25 May 1912), formerly Mary Blair and Mary Sutherland-Leveson-Gower, Duchess of Sutherland, was a British peeress best known for her scandalous affair with the 3rd Duke of Sutherland and her prison sentence for interfering in the execution of her husband's will. Around the time of the death of her first husband in a shooting accident, Mary became the duke's mistress. She travelled with him under the pseudonym "Lady Clare" and when news reached them in 1888 that the duke's wife, Anne, had died, they chose to marry in Dunedin, Florida. The marriage caused an immediate international scandal. His children, as well as Queen Victoria, were infuriated, resulting in bitter and strained relations for the rest of their lives. Her contemporaries refused to address her as the Duchess of Sutherland, opting to nickname her "Duchess Blair".

== Early life ==
Blair was born in Oxford in 1848 to Richard Michell principal of Hertford College, Oxford, and his wife Amelia (née Blair). In 1872 she married Arthur Kindersley Blair, formerly a captain in the 71st Highland Light Infantry. He had resigned his commission in 1861 and was then employed as land agent and business manager by George Sutherland-Leveson-Gower, 3rd Duke of Sutherland, who was one of the richest people in Britain, owning 1.4 million acres of land and multiple grand estates. When Queen Victoria visited the Sutherlands' London residence, Stafford House, she noted that Stafford House was more of a palace than her own home.

== Life with the duke ==
Mary Caroline became the Duke of Sutherland's mistress sometime around 1883 when her husband died in a shooting accident. There was speculation that it was suicide or murder, although the official verdict was accidental death. The affair continued after her husband's death, but in 1889, she caused a scandal when she and the duke married only four months after the death of the duke's estranged wife. They were married at the Church of the Good Shepherd in Dunedin, Florida, on 4 March 1889. Their marriage broke the convention that widowers should not remarry for a year, and it went against the advice of Queen Victoria to not remarry so quickly. After marriage, Mary Caroline became the Duchess of Sutherland and obtained an exalted rank in British society. However, the scandal surrounding their extramarital affair and the swift marriage resulted in her being ostracized by high society. She was never fully welcomed into society life upon her return to Great Britain.

== Life after the duke ==
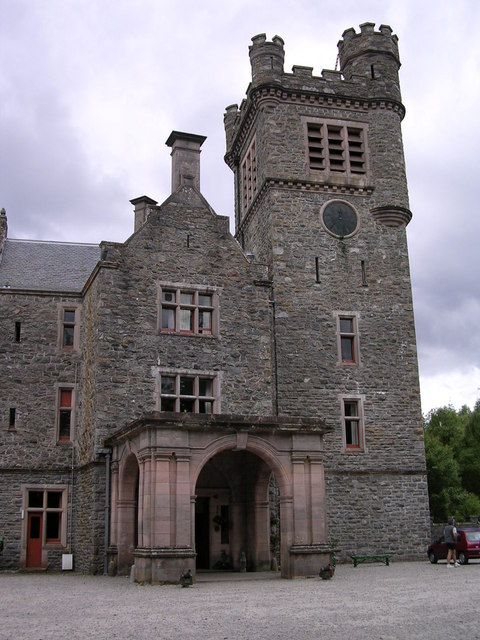
Carbisdale Castle

In 1892, the duke died. His children never accepted Mary Caroline into the family. Knowing and resenting this, the duke wrote his will to leave a large portion of his estate to Mary Caroline as he was concerned that she wouldn't be looked after and become financially unstable after his death. His children, led by Cromartie, 4th Duke of Sutherland, swiftly contested the will. During official proceedings, Mary Caroline burnt some letters from the duke to her. This action led to her being charged with contempt of court, and she was fined and sent to the Holloway prison for six weeks. After her release, negotiations continued. An agreement was reached in which Mary Caroline was given sufficient funds to build Carbisdale Castle.

The castle was built outside the family's lands near Dunrobin Castle in Scotland. It was designed with a clock tower that had just three faces. The fourth face had no clock as it faced the family's lands, and it was said that Mary Caroline did not wish to "give them the time of day." The house was lavishly furnished, and Mary Caroline bought paintings and sculptures, including Andromeda by Pasquale Romanelli.

Mary Caroline would marry one more time. Her third husband, Sir Albert Rollit, was a renowned British politician and lawyer.

She died in London on 25 May 1912. In accordance with a clause in the will of her second husband, she was buried alongside him at Trentham Mausoleum.
