= Russell Reid =

British doctor

- Medical career
- Profession: Consultant Psychiatrist
- Sub-specialties: Gender Identity Disorder

Russell Reid is a retired consultant psychiatrist who specialized in sexual and gender-related conditions. He is particularly known for his work with gender identity disorder patients. Richard Curtis took over his practice after his retirement. Reid grew up in New Zealand and worked privately in the United Kingdom. Britain's best-known expert on gender reassignment, he was a member of the parliamentary forum on transsexualism.

In 2006–2007, Reid was investigated by the General Medical Council (GMC), the regulatory body for doctors in the UK. A serious professional misconduct hearing opened following complaints brought by four doctors from the main NHS Gender Identity Clinic at Charing Cross hospital, west London, and some of his former patients. It is alleged that he breached international standards of care, set by the Harry Benjamin International Gender Dysphoria Association (HBIGDA) by inappropriately prescribing cross-gender hormones to patients and referring them for sex reassignment surgery without adequate assessment.

Britain's primary lobbying organization for transgender and transsexual people, Press for Change, was quoted as saying that Reid received support during the process from more than 150 patients as well as additional experts in the area. Ultimately, the enquiry found Reid guilty of serious professional misconduct, mostly for failing to communicate fully with patients' GPs and not documenting his reasons for departing from the HBIGDA Standards of Care guidelines sufficiently. However, the panel "determined that it would be in the public interest as well as [Reid's] own interests if [he] were to return to practice under strict conditions." and allowed him to return to practice, subject to some restrictions on his practice and hormone prescriptions for the next 12 months.

Reid was a member of an expert committee set up by the Royal College of Psychiatrists to draw up new UK care guidelines on the treatment of Gender identity disorder. He stepped down as a member of the group in the wake of the GMC inquiry.

Reid was also interviewed as part of a BBC documentary, Complete Obsession, dealing with patients seeking limb amputations.
