= Saltford Manor House =

Saltford Manor
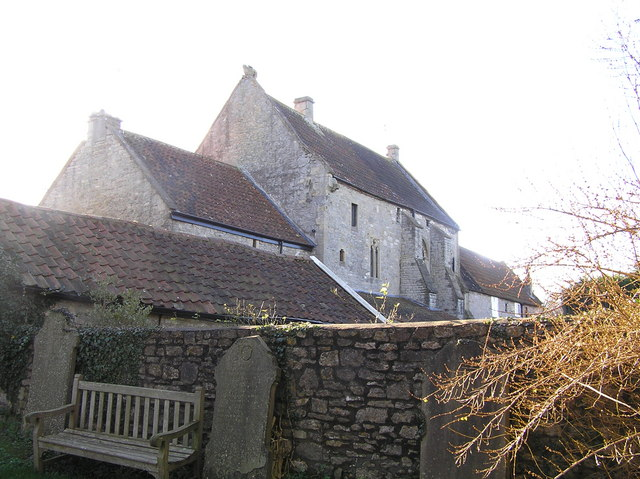

- Location within Somerset
- 51°24′19″N 2°27′13″W
- Location: Saltford

History
- Built: 1148–50

Listed Building – Grade II*
- Designated: 27 February 1950
- Reference no.: 1384672

The Saltford Manor is a stone house in Saltford, Somerset, near Bath, that is thought to be the oldest continuously occupied private house in England, and has been designated as a Grade II* listed building.

The original Norman construction was by William Fitz Robert, 2nd Earl of Gloucester between 1148 and 1150, and was built on an estate owned at the time of the Domesday Book by Geoffrey de Montbray the Bishop of Coutances. It is contemporary with nearby Horton Court which was a prebendary house, therefore it is likely that Saltford had an association with Keynsham Abbey, and has long been associated with St Mary's Church in Saltford.

In 2003, Saltford Manor was the winner of a contest sponsored by Country Life to find the "oldest continuously inhabited house in Britain". There were hundreds of entrants, many eliminated because they had been built, as ecclesiastical buildings and only become available in the housing market after Henry VIII dissolved the monasteries. Other very old dwellings were eliminated because they are now used as shops or museums. After winning the contest, its resident at the time James Wynn, wrote a history book about the manor entitled The House That Jack Built: The Story of the Oldest Inhabited House in Britain. The book described his love for the site and how he restored it to its current state in 1997.

In 2008 Saltford Manor was put up for sale and eventually was sold, on 27 August 2010 for £1,275,000.

== Architecture ==
Architectural historian John Goodall believes the house has details, particularly in the ornate windows, which date it to before 1150, and probably to around 1148, the completion date of Hereford Cathedral, which has some similarities, notably a Norman arch etched with diamond markings that are similar to features in the Cathedral.

Nikolaus Pevsner points to the rare survival of a fragment of a medieval painting as an important feature of the house. Other historically significant details include a Norman window in the main bedroom, a 17th-century kitchen, and an "imposing" Tudor fireplace in the sitting room.

Architectural historian Anthony Emery believes that the house originally consisted of a large single room on each floor with a vaulted chamber on the ground floor.

Major remodelling was carried out in the 17th century being undertaken during the ownership of two generations of the Flower family. The dovecote next to the barn in the grounds dates from this period.

== See also ==
- List of oldest buildings in the United Kingdom
