= Catherine Marsh =

English philanthropist and author

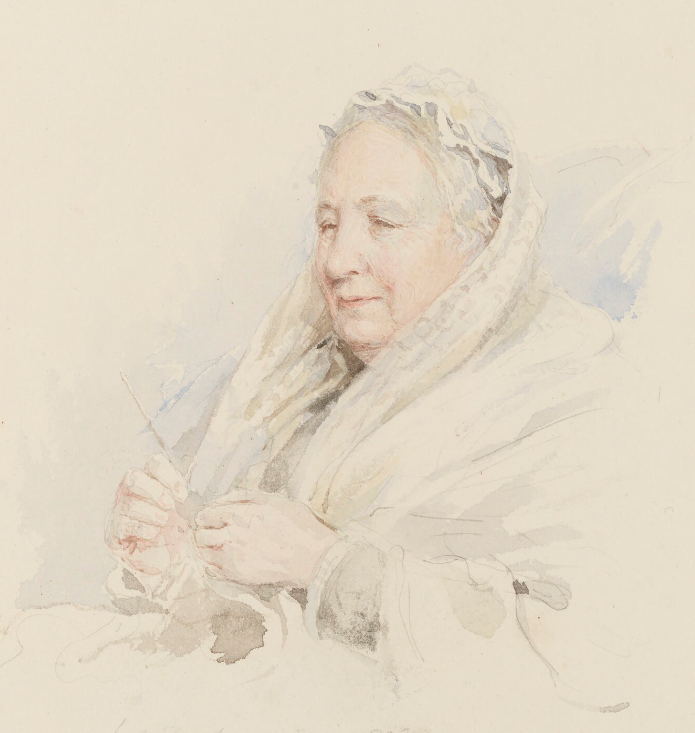
- Born: 15 September 1818; Colchester
- Died: 12 December 1912 (aged 94); Feltwell
- Occupation: Writer
- Writing career
- Pen name: Miss Marsh

Catherine Marsh or Miss C. M. Marsh (15 September 1818 – 12 December 1912) was an English philanthropist and author who wrote multiple books which dealt heavily into religious themes and ideology throughout the mid to late 1800s.

== Early life ==
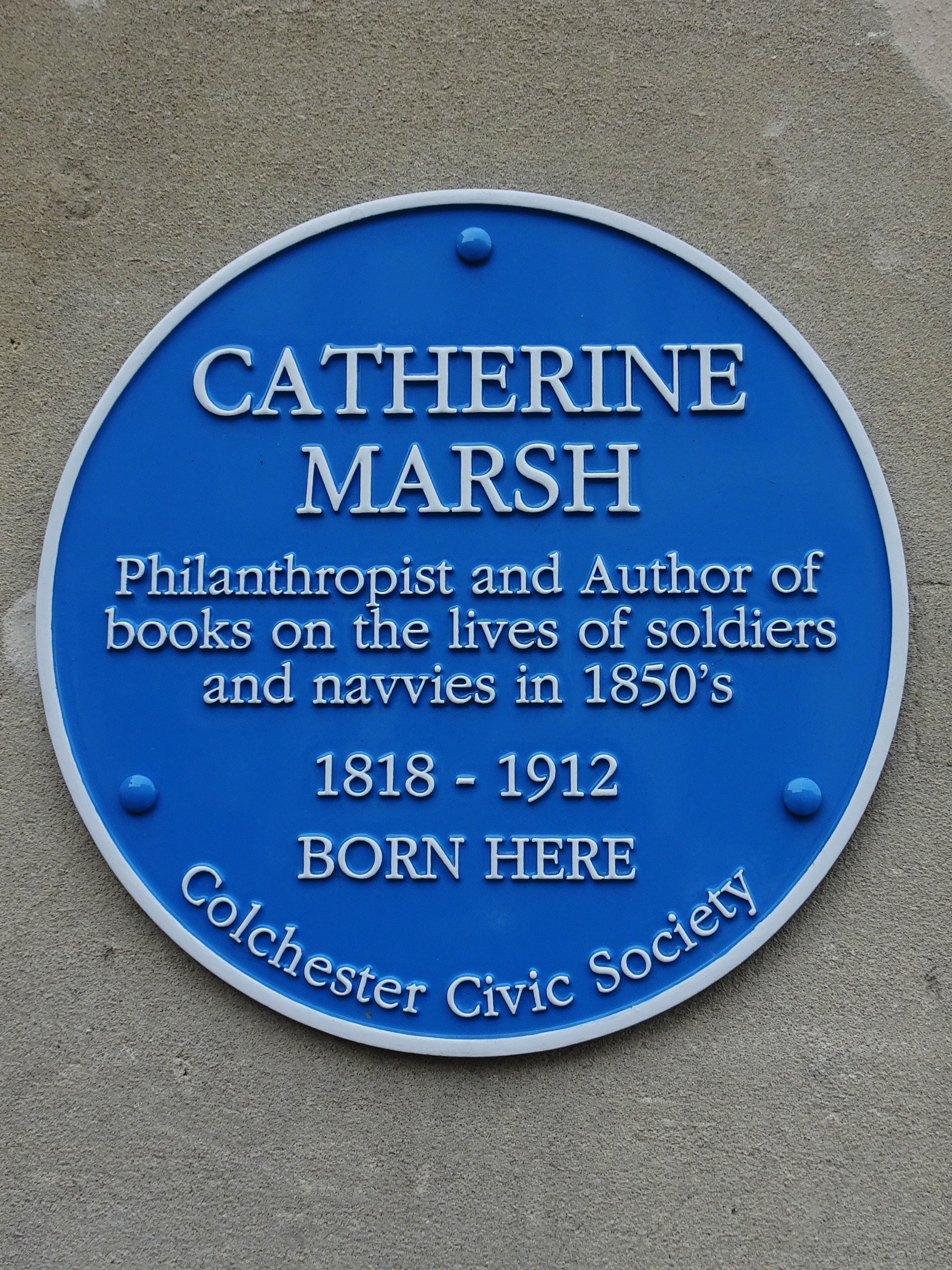
Plaque at the Albert Hall Building denoting the birthplace and birthdate of Catherine Marsh

Catherine Marsh was born in Colchester on 15 September 1818, the daughter of Rev. William Marsh, a clergyman who she lived with for the remainder of his life, and his wife Maria Chowne (née Tilson) in the vicarage of St Peter's, Colchester. Catherine was one of five children and the youngest of her siblings. From her youth Marsh displayed a lively mind and an early interest in writing. Strong clerical ties related to her upbringing instilled within Catherine Marsh a strong evangelical faith which followed her for her entire life and bled heavily into many of her subsequent works. This clerical upbringing also incentivized Marsh into considering the plights of others, specifically the less privileged, this affected her later works and writings significantly. Catherine frequently is cited as having interacted with soldiers and veterans of war during her time in life. In Catherine Marsh's biography written by Lucy Elizabeth Marshall O'Rorke she is described as being heavily involved in her community, taking a special interest in bringing aspects of faith to the soldiers and navvy around her. It was this strengthened communal connection as well as the emotional interest she took in their struggles which led to her first major publication in 1855.

== Memorials of Captain Hedley Vicars (1855) ==
Illustration of Hedley Vicars taken from 'The Memorials of Captain Hedley Vicars'

Catherine Marsh was concerned with the at the time ongoing Crimean War which had broken out in October 1853. She decided to write about the life of British army soldier and fellow evangelist Hedley Shafto Johnstone Vicars. Vicars was described by William Marsh in a letter to the editor of the evangelical Anglican Record fourteen days before his passing as a close friend and exemplary gentleman who had undergone an induction into the faith as part of his time in the church. Catherine Marsh and Vicars had conversed with one another through letters and conversation which is shown throughout her publication. She was urged by the family of Vicars to move forward with the publication of her work after his death on the 22nd of March, 1855 in the line of duty. In 1855 the hagiographical Memorials of Captain Hedley Vicars was published. It was well read and 78,000 copies were sold in the first twelve months. The book resonated strongly with members of the church and individuals across the country, receiving multiple summarizations, synopsis, and abstracts in local and national newspapers. The book caused minor backlash to the Crimean war and the larger practice of sending soldiers away, though this is said to have been very short lived. As a result of this work Marsh received letters of encouragement from the Archbishop of Canterbury, the evangelical John Bird Sumner, and the liberal Anglican Charles Kingsley, all of whom were notable figures at the time.

== English Hearts and English Hands (1858) ==
In 1858 Catherine Marsh published a similar work English Hearts and English Hands which sympathetically described the navvy's life having witnessed the workers who had been re-building The Crystal Palace. The book is centered around a sympathetic look into the working class as well as serving as a backdrop for dissatisfactions among laborers at the time. The working class, referred to as navvys, lived self described unstable and mobile lifestyles which followed the labor need. In the conclusions of the book Marsh makes a request to the readers and general public to reach out to these laborers and provide opportunities of worship and commune as well as more physical means of aid. Marsh recounts in the book instances of her personally visiting the lodging of these laborers to provide opportunities for prayer. She recounts how many of the men turned to religion as a result of her efforts, something which according to Marsh herself a great many of the men did not indulge in. Through the remainder of her life she continued to visit and commune with navvy. That book led to an exchange of letters with Julia Wightman who was an advocate for Temperance in Shrewsbury. In 1859 Wightman published her own book that included many of the letters.

== The Victory Won, a Brief Memorial of the Last Days of G.R. (1860) ==
The Victory Won was published in 1860. It is, like Marsh's other works, a biographical account of an individual who is referred to only as "G.R." The "victory won" as described in the book is in reference to the spiritual acceptance of G.R. into the Christian faith and his subsequent "saving" by the religion before death. Marsh personally oversaw this conversion into faith before G.R.'s death at an indeterminate date.

== The Life of Arthur Vandeleur, Major, Royal Artillery (1862) ==
The Life of Arthur Vandeleur, Major, Royal Artillery is a hagiographical account of Arthur Vandeleur, Major in the Royal Artillery. It traces his life from his childhood, through his military service, his conversion to faith, his moral and spiritual struggles and victories, and ends with reflections on his death and legacy. This work is similar to the Memorials of Captain Hadley Vicars in many ways, it follows a similar narrative process as well as presents the same idolization of Vandeleur as a " Christian soldier." Catherine Marsh met Vandeleur in the spring of 1859 when he and his wife had come to stay at the rectory in Beckenham. Marsh had been friends with Vandeleur ever since they had exchanged letters of communication while he had been in training in preparation for his deployment into the Crimean War. Vandeleur died in 1860 shortly after his arrival at the rectory in Beckenham. It was at Mrs. Vandeleur's request that Catherine Marsh author a work about the life of her husband.

== The Life of Rev. William Marsh D.D. (1868) ==
In 1866 there was an outbreak of cholera and Marsh created a convalescent home in Brighton. The following year she published a biography of her father. It is indicated that Catherine Marsh was intensely close to her father, having penned his biography which was published in 1868 just four years after his death on 24 August 1864. Her father was also a writer, having published 14 books which dealt heavily into his theological ideas and practices. Catherine describes this death as sudden in her biography on her father mentioning that two months prior to his passing he was reading and conversing with his peers about the past. It did not appear to her as though there were any signs of declining health. After her father's death it is said in Marsh's biography that her faith was strengthened and she continued to uphold her duties and values within her church and community.

== Shining Light (1869) ==
Shining Light was published in 1869 and was the last major work authored by Catherine Marsh. It is a nonfiction account of one "William Spencer" and how his devotion to faith and modification of his own morality and ideals lead to a stronger connection to his community. There are very few details about the life and times of William Spencer outside of this work, though he is presented as being a humble railway porter who lived and died within the same town. The book was published posthumously to William Spencer's death.

== Death ==
Marsh died in Feltwell rectory in Norfolk in 1912 at the age of 94. Five years after her death in 1917, The Life and Friendships of Catherine Marsh by Lucy Elizabeth Marshall O'Rorke was published.
