= Charles Symons =

Charles Douglas Symons, CB, MC (13 October 1885 – 15 October 1949) was an Anglican priest.

== Early life and education ==
He was born on 13 October 1885 and was educated at Kelly College, now known as Mount Kelly, Tavistock and Trinity College, Cambridge. He graduated from the University of Cambridge with a second class Bachelor of Arts (BA) degree; as per tradition, this was later promoted to a Master of Arts (MA (Cantab)) degree. He awarded a Lambeth Doctor of Divinity (DD) degree in 1939.

== Ordained ministry ==
Symons was ordained a deacon in 1908. His first post was as chaplain to Queen Elizabeth's Grammar School in Cranbrook, Kent. He was ordained a priest by Randall Davidson, the Archbishop of Canterbury, on Trinity Sunday 1911. He undertook two curacies; at Biddenden and at Walmer in the Diocese of Canterbury.

Symons served in the ranks of the Royal Army Medical Corps from 1915 to 1916. He served with the Royal Army Chaplains Department from 1916 to 1944. From 1939 to 1944, he served as Chaplain-General to the Forces.

An Honorary Chaplain to the King and a Chaplain of the Order of St John of Jerusalem, he died on 15 October 1949.

Military offices
Preceded by Ernest Hayford Thorold	Chaplain-General to the Forces; 1939–1944	Succeeded by Frederick Llewelyn Hughes
