= Saltford House =

Building in England

Coordinates: 51.4046°N 2.4564°W

Saltford House is a Grade II listed building in the village of Saltford, Somerset, England.

== History ==
The house was built in 1771. It was probably built for his own use by the architect Thomas Bennett. The three storey limestone building has a central door with ionic half columns on either side. The gateways and garden walls were built at the same time as the house.

Saltford House was the home of Mary and William James. He was a lieutenant-colonel of the East India Company in 1817 when they were in Cawnpore and their daughter Julia was born. She would be a Temperance campaigner in Shrewsbury. In 1830 the house was nearly demolished to make way for the railway, but Major James wanted such a high price that Isambard Kingdom Brunel would create a better route that would just miss the building.

In 1856 it was bought by Admiral Benedictus Marwood Kelly who died there on 26 September 1867. In 2016 the local member of parliament, Jacob Rees-Mogg unveiled a blue plaque at the house commemorating the time when the admiral was resident.
