= Saltford =

Village in Somerset, England

Coordinates: 51.4015°N 2.4592°W

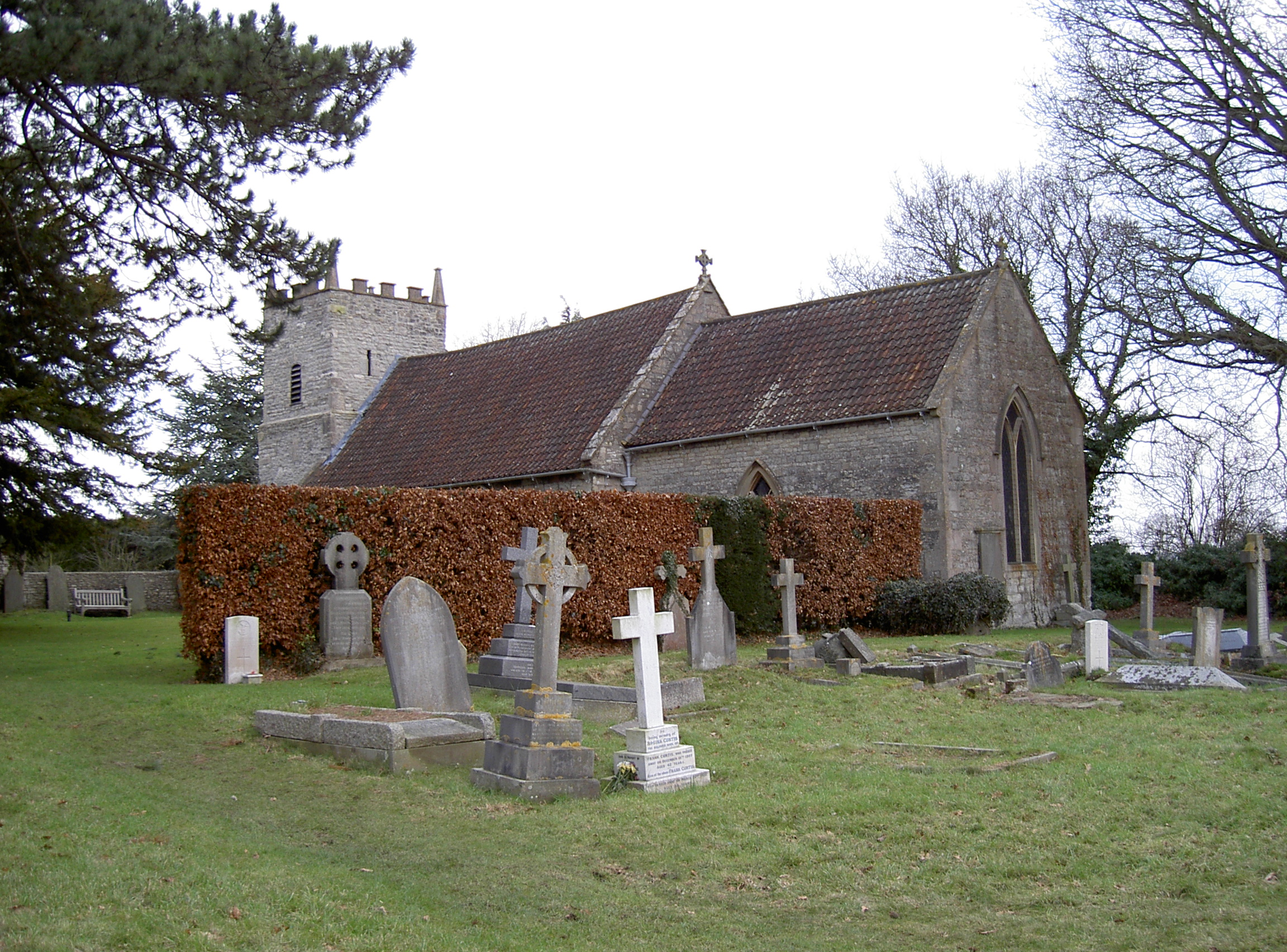
- St Mary's Church, Saltford

- Location within Somerset
- Population: 4,073 (2011)
- OS grid reference: ST681670
- Unitary authority: Bath and North East Somerset
- Ceremonial county: Somerset
- Region: South West
- Country: England
- Sovereign state: United Kingdom
- Post town: BRISTOL
- Postcode district: BS31
- Dialling code: 01225
- Police: Avon and Somerset
- Fire: Avon
- Ambulance: South Western
- UK Parliament: North East Somerset and Hanham

Saltford is a large English village and civil parish in the Bath and North East Somerset unitary authority in the county of Somerset. It lies between the cities of Bristol and Bath, and adjoins Keynsham on the same route. Saltford Manor House (built about 1160) claims to be the oldest continuously occupied dwelling in England.

== Amenities ==
The village lies on the A4 road and on the River Avon, to which the Saltford and Kelston locks provide access. The low-lying area is prone to flooding.

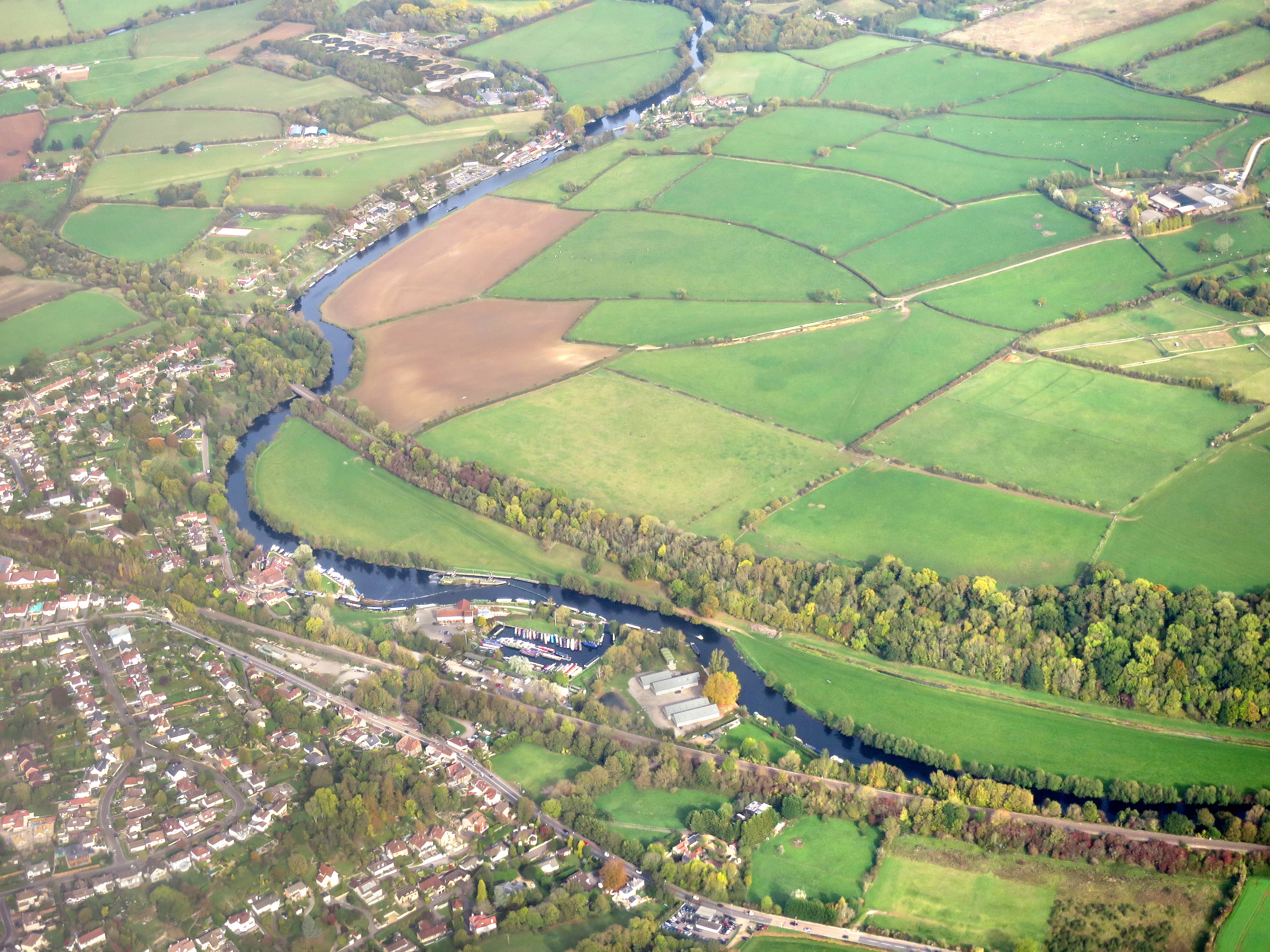
Aerial view of Saltford and the river Avon

There are four public houses in the village: The Bird in Hand, The Jolly Sailor, The Crown and The Riverside. Saltford possesses a number of listed buildings.

In 1948 the residents started a community fund that was used to build a village hall. Saltford Hall was completed in 1961, after residents had given their time free to digging the foundations and building the main hall itself. Since its completion, it has been run by a voluntary charity, the Saltford Community Association. Its fund-raising committee not only raises the money to maintain and improve the Hall, it also supports local charities. The hall provides for local community events and services such as blood donation evenings, citizens advice, community support and entertainment. It has recently introduced a week-long village festival.

== History ==
The parish of Saltford was part of the Keynsham Hundred.

== Governance ==
Saltford Parish Council, like all parish councils of England, has responsibility for local issues. The parish falls within the unitary authority of Bath and North East Somerset, which was created in 1996 under the Local Government Act 1992. Fire, police and ambulance services are provided jointly with other authorities through the Avon Fire and Rescue Service, Avon and Somerset Constabulary and the Great Western Ambulance Service.

Saltford elects two councillors to the unitary authority, Bath and North East Somerset Council.

Bath and North East Somerset's area covers some of the ceremonial county of Somerset, but is administered separately from the non-metropolitan county, whose headquarters are in Bath. Between 1 April 1974 and 1 April 1996, it was the Wansdyke district and the City of Bath of the county of Avon. Before 1974 the parish was part of Keynsham Urban District.

The parish is represented in the House of Commons as part of North East Somerset and Hanham. It elects one member of parliament (MP) by the first past the post system; the sitting MP is Dan Norris (Labour).

== Historic buildings ==
St Mary's Church, Saltford, a Norman church dating back to the 12th century, is a Grade II listed building. The tower dates from Saxon times, although it has been extensively repaired and the top 10 feet were added later. The church used to include an external porch, but this was demolished in the 19th century and the stone used to build the vestry; the line of the porch can still be viewed on the ground, by the layout of the drainage. In the 19th century, there were internal changes to the church. For instance, an organ gallery was built in the early part of the century.

Saltford Manor House, which lies west of the church, dates from around 1160, and was found through a survey by Country Life magazine to be the oldest continuously occupied house in England. Architectural historian John Goodall believes the house has details, particularly in the ornate windows, which date it securely to before 1150, and probably to around 1148, the completion date of Hereford Cathedral, with which it has some similarities. The façade of the house dates from the 17th century.

The 18th-century Old Brass Mill, like the Manor House, is listed as Grade II* and is also a Scheduled Ancient Monument. The Brass Mill was one of a series along the Avon Valley powered by water wheels.

Saltford House was built in 1771. In 1856 it was bought by Admiral Benedictus Marwood Kelly who died there on 26 September 1867.

== Sport ==
The village is the location of the Avon County Rowing Club, which is available to all local age groups. The riverside complex also houses boathouses used by Bristol University and Monkton Combe School for training. ACRC has competed at local and national level, having success with its veteran 4 at racing events like the Henley Royal Regatta and other events like the British Rowing Championships.

Saltford Football Club is affiliated to the Somerset Football Association and a Charter Standard club.

== Education ==
Saltford C of E Primary School was rated outstanding overall in the 2023 Ofsted report and outstanding for behaviour and safety of pupils.

A school has existed in the village for several centuries. Originally housed in what is now St Mary's Church Hall, it is now off Claverton Road. It has its own swimming pool, large fields, a pond and a playground. The school has invested much in IT facilities and its library. It has a purpose-built before-and-after school nursery on site, run by a national business.

== Transport ==
Saltford is about 12 miles (18 km) from junction 1 of the M32 via the Avon Ring Road A4174, which provides a fast route to the M4 and M5.

Bus services connect Saltford with Bath, Keynsham and Bristol. The Saltford Environment Group is campaigning to reopen Saltford railway station on the Bath–Bristol line, which was closed in 1970.

== Notable residents ==
In birth order:

- Benedictus Marwood Kelly (1785–1867), a Royal Navy admiral, served in the French wars and later as a railway company director.
- Horace Batchelor (1898–1977), gambling advertiser.
- Donald Wilkins (1903–1972), a first-class cricketer for Somerset, died in Saltford.
- Racey Helps (1913–1970), children's writer and illustrator, was best known for the character Barnaby Littlemouse.
