= Donald Wilkins =

English cricketer

Personal information
- Full name: Donald Albert Wilkins
- Born: 13 October 1903; Bristol, England
- Died: 22 January 1972 (aged 68); Saltford, Somerset, England
- Batting: Right-handed

Domestic team information
- Years: Team
- 1927: Somerset

Career statistics
Competition	FC
Matches	2
Runs scored	6
Batting average	2.00
100s/50s	0/0
Top score	3
Catches/stumpings	1/–
- Source: CricketArchive, 22 December 2015

Donald Albert Wilkins (13 October 1903 – 22 January 1972) played first-class cricket for Somerset in two matches in the 1927 season. He was born at Bristol and died at Saltford, Somerset.

Wilkins was a right-handed middle-order batsman. He made his debut in a rain-ruined match against Yorkshire at Bath, scoring two in the only innings of the match that even started. Two weeks later, in another match affected by rain, he made three and one against Lancashire at Taunton. These were the only matches of his first-class cricket career.
