= Nicholas Bomford =

British schoolmaster (1939–2025)

- Born: Nicholas Raymond Bomford; 27 January 1939; Evesham, England
- Died: 21 June 2025 (aged 86); Newland, Gloucestershire, England
- Education: Kelly College
- Alma mater: University of Oxford
- Employer(s): Britannia Royal Naval College; Wellington College; Monmouth School; Uppingham School; Harrow School
- Spouse: Gillian Reynolds (m. 1966)
- Children: 2

Nicholas Raymond Bomford (27 January 1939 – 21 June 2025) was a British schoolmaster who served as headmaster of Monmouth, Uppingham and Harrow schools.

== Early life and education ==
Bomford, the son of a farmer, Ernest, and Pat (née Brooke), was born in the Vale of Evesham in Worcestershire in 1939. His father's family had farmed in the Vale since the 16th century. He attended Kelly College in Devon, followed by Trinity College, Oxford, where he read history, and captained the university rifle club.

== Career ==
Bomford's first teaching posts were at the Britannia Royal Naval College and Wellington College, Berkshire. He was appointed headmaster of Monmouth School in 1977, at the age of thirty-eight. (Note: A modern altar cloth used in the school chapel was the parting gift from Bomford and his wife on their leaving for Uppingham in 1982.) During his time at the school, he initiated the construction of the school's new science block, opened by Princess Margaret, Countess of Snowdon in May 1982. The same year he took up the role of head at Uppingham School. During his tenure at Uppingham, in November 1984, Bomford entertained the then queen, Elizabeth II on a visit to the school, as the culmination of its quatercentenary celebrations. A history of the school, published in 2018, described his headship: "[he] valued pupils as individuals, managed a smooth-running school, and led a harmonious community". Between 1986 and 1989 he chaired the Headmasters' Conference.

In 1991 he succeeded to the headship of Harrow School, his final post until his retirement in 1999. At Harrow he oversaw the building of the Ryan Theatre, where he witnessed Benedict Cumberbatch, then a pupil, perform in a staging of The Browning Version. (Note: A less welcome event during his tenure was the trial and conviction of a master at the school for embezzlement of funds provided by parents for overseas trips. Bomford commented on the scandal; "One assumed one was dealing with someone one could trust. He slipped through the net".) His time at Harrow also saw the commencement of a major restoration of the school's Vaughan Library, which was completed in 2000; (Note: The Vaughan Library commemorated Charles John Vaughan, a transformative headmaster in the mid-19th century. Designed by George Gilbert Scott in a Gothic Revival style, the foundation stone was laid by Lord Palmerston, whose devotion to his old school overcame his well-known aversion to neo-Gothic architecture.) (Note: In an interview given to The Independent in 1997, Bomford described the Speech Room at Harrow, designed by William Burges in 1877, as "the heart of the school".) (Note: The diarist and royal biographer, Kenneth Rose, visited the school in 1994 to view an exhibition commemorating another Harrow alumnus, Lord Byron: "I meet the headmaster, Nicholas Bomford, a genial man, who kindly says to me, 'Are you not the man who brought George V to life?'” (The reference is to Rose's biography of the king, which brought him the Whitbread Book Award in 1983.)) and the appointment of the first women to the school's teaching staff.

== Personal life and death ==
Bomford married Gillian Reynolds in 1966. The couple had two daughters. On leaving Harrow, Bomford retired to Newland, Gloucestershire, just to the south of the town of Monmouth, where he held his first headship. He published a memoir, The Long Meadow, in 2013. He died on 21 June 2025, at the age of 86.

== Sources ==
- Edwards, Stephen; Moseley, Keith (2014). Monmouth School: The First 400 Years. London: Third Millennium Publishing. ISBN 978-1-906-50791-6.
- Kissack, Keith (1995). Monmouth School and Monmouth 1614–1995. Hereford: Lapridge Publications. ISBN 978-0-951-85898-1.
- Lewis, Justin (2015). Benedict Cumberbatch: the biography. London: John Blake Publishing. ISBN 978-1-784-18392-9.
- Richardson, Nigel (2015). Typhoid in Uppingham: Analysis of a Victorian Town and School in Crisis, 1875-7. Abingdon-on-Thames: Routledge. ISBN 978-1-317-31390-8.
- Rose, Kenneth (2019). D. R. Thorpe (ed.). Who Loses, Who Wins: The Journals of Kenneth Rose. Vol. 2. London: Orion Publishing Group. ISBN 978-1-474-61060-5.
- Tozer, Malcolm (2018). Education in Manliness: The Legacy of Thring's Uppingham. Abingdon-on-Thames: Taylor & Francis. ISBN 978-1-351-06592-4.
