= Ernest Thorold =

Anglican priest (1879–1940)

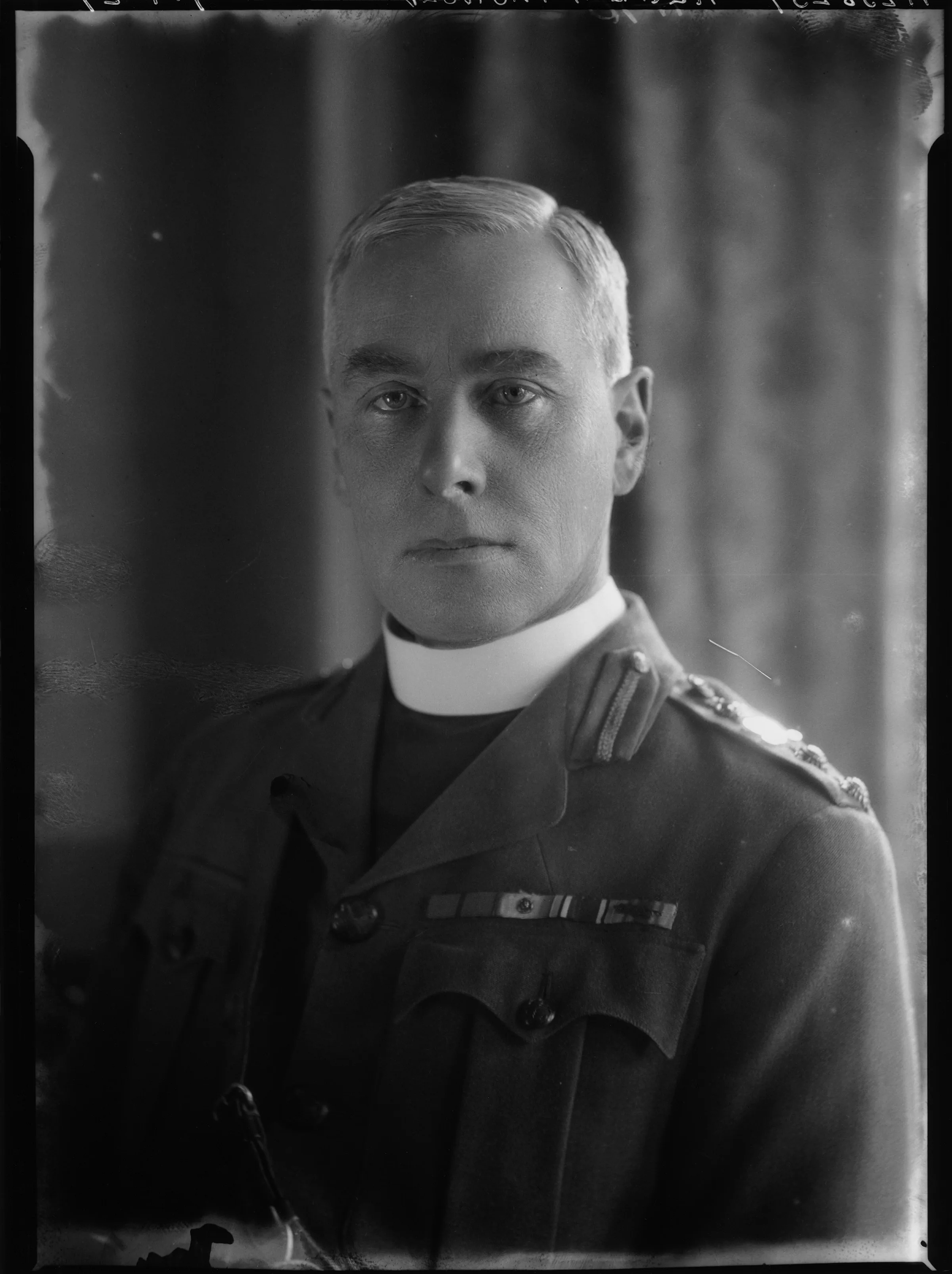
Thorold in 1929

Ernest Hayford Thorold, CB, CBE (17 February 1879 – 6 February 1940) was an Anglican priest in the 20th century.

He was born into an ecclesiastical family in 1879 and was educated at Highgate School and The Queen's College, Oxford.

He became a Chaplain to the British Armed Forces in 1906 serving in Shorncliffe, southern Africa and Aldershot before gallant service in the First World War where he was Mentioned in Despatches twice and awarded the OBE and CBE. He was Staff Officer to the Chaplain-General at the War Office from 1916 to 1921 and then Chaplain at the Royal Military Chapel, London.

He was Assistant Chaplain-General, Western Command from 1924 and an Honorary Chaplain to the King from 1926 – 1935. He was then from 1935 – 1939 successively Chaplain to Kings George V, Edward VIII and George VI. After further commands with the Southern Command and the Aldershot Command he was Chaplain-General to the British Armed Forces (and also Chaplain of the Tower of London) from 1931 to 1939.

A Chaplain of the Order of St John of Jerusalem, he died on 6 February 1940.

Church of England titles
Preceded by Alfred Charles Eustace Jarvis	Chaplain-General to the Forces; 1931–1939	Succeeded by Charles Douglas Symons
