= Kelly College =

Public school in Tavistock, Devon, England

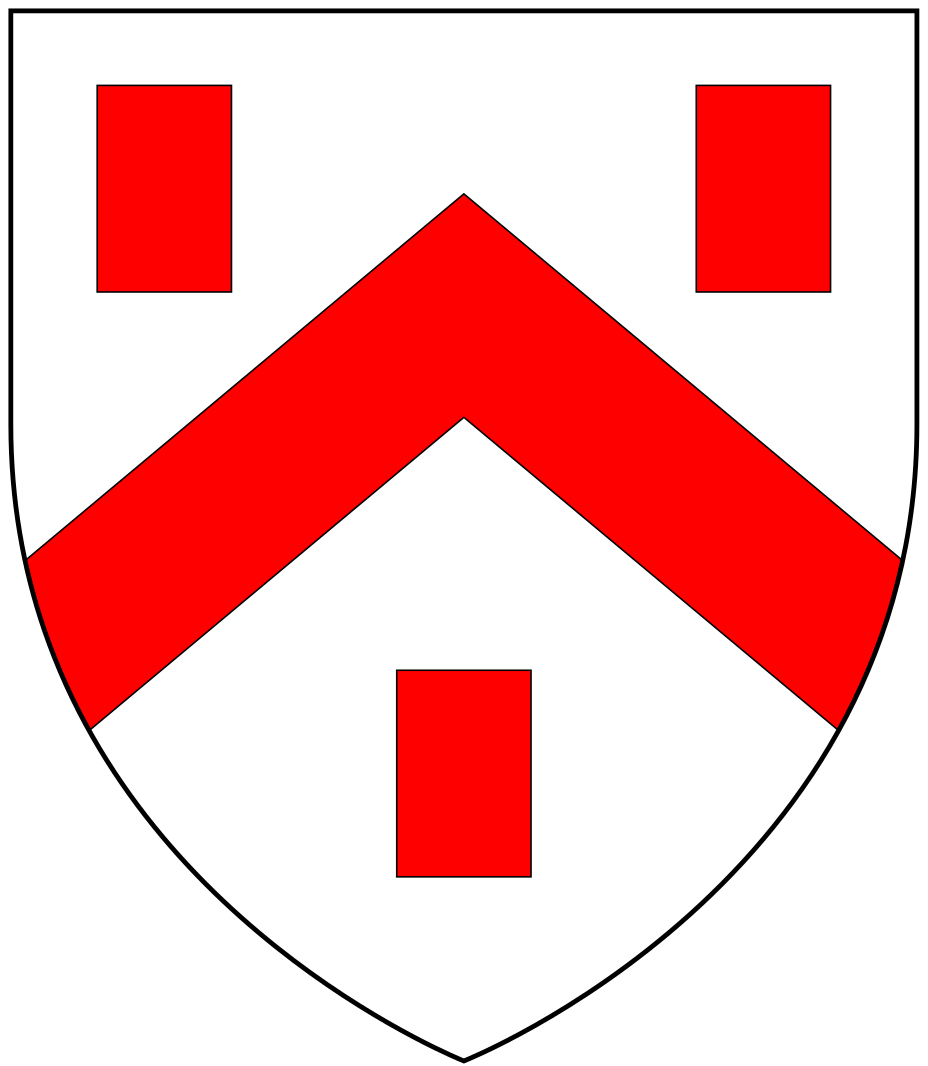

- Tavistock

Information
- Type: Public school Independent school Day and boarding school Co-educational
- Motto: Fortiter Occupa Portum ("Defend your harbours bravely")
- Religious affiliation: Church of England
- Established: 1877
- Founder: Admiral Benedictus Marwood Kelly
- Closed: 2014
- Chairman of the Governors: Rear Admiral Christopher Snow
- Head Master: Graham Hawley
- Staff: c.66
- Gender: Co-educational
- Age: 3 to 18
- Enrolment: 310
- Houses: School (Girls YR9-11) Marwood (Girls Sixth Form Boarders) Russell (Girls Day Sixth Form) Courtenay (Boys Sixth Form) Newton (Boys YR9-11) Conway (Mixed) 1st & 2nd years only
- Colours: Navy & white
- Publication: Kelly College Chronicle (Annual)
- Former pupils: Old Kelleians
- Ofsted: Good
- Virtual Houses: Tamar; Plym; Lyd; Walkham

Kelly College was a coeducational independent school in the English public school tradition situated in the outskirts of Tavistock, Devon, with around 350 students ranging from ages 3 to 18. There was an associated preparatory school for primary school children, Kelly College Preparatory School, nearby. In June 2014, the school formally merged with Mount House School to form Mount Kelly School.

The college had twenty acres (eight hectares) of landscaped grounds, including playing fields, set on the edge of Dartmoor and including a stretch of the River Tavy, and four separate senior boarding houses, and a junior house, each with its own facilities.

The last headship was of Mr Mark Semmence who joined the college in 2013. The college's motto is fortiter occupa portum - "defend your harbours bravely", a quotation from Ode XIV from the first Book of Odes by Horace.^{(1)}

It offered many extracurricular activities, such as the CCF (Combined Cadet Force) and the DofE Scheme; in addition to a wide variety of sporting activities.

== History ==
The school was founded in 1877 after Admiral Benedictus Marwood Kelly left the great part of his real and personal estate to Trustees, founding a charity which he directed should be called "The Kelly College", which should be for the education of the "sons of Naval officers and other gentlemen". The school opened in October 1877, under the Headmastership of Robert West Taylor, late fellow of St John's College, Cambridge, with twelve boys on the school roll. It became co-educational in the early 1970s, initially with entrants into the Sixth Form, and in September 1991 welcomed thirty one girls into the First Form, fourteen of whom became Kelly Veterans in 1998.

== Houses ==
The School had six houses;

School house (Girls Year 9-11 boarding/day House) (founded 1877), Courtenay House (Senior Boys House boarding /day) (founded 1901), Newton House (Boys Year 9-11 boarding/day house) (founded 1939), Conway House (Junior house, 1st and 2nd form only) (founded 1975), and Marwood House (Senior Girls House) (founded 1983),

== Notable attendees ==
"Old Kelleians"

- Adedayo Adebayo, rugby player
- Dawn Airey, media executive
- Nicholas Bomford, schoolmaster who served as headmaster of Monmouth, Uppingham and Harrow Schools
- Robin Brew, British Olympic Swimmer
- Claire Cashmore, swimmer
- Sharron Davies, swimmer
- Flora Duffy, Bermudian triathlete
- Femi Fani-Kayode, Nigerian politician
- George Hacker, Bishop of Penrith
- Andy Jameson, BBC Sports commentator & former Olympic swimmer
- Ellen Keane, swimmer
- John Lucas, Archdeacon of Totnes
- Rod Mason, Trad Jazz Vocalist, trumpet and cornet player
- Malcolm Stewart Hannibal McArthur, first British resident in Brunei
- Sir Gordon Minhinnick, cartoonist
- Hannah Russell, swimmer
- Michael Jones, swimmer
- Gerald Seymour, novelist and former ITN correspondent
- Lauren Steadman, triathlete
- Bishop Mervyn Stockwood, Bishop of Southwark
- Thomas Douglas Victor Swinscow, deputy editor British Medical Journal (1964 - 1977) and founder of British Lichen Society and The Lichenologist.
- Charles Symons, Chaplain-General to the Forces
- Sir Hugh Thornton, civil servant
- Air Marshall Sir Richard Gordon Wakeford, RAF officer
- Jakie Wellman, Zambian Olympic Swimmer
- Mike Westbrook, jazz musician
