= Kingston House, Shrewsbury =

Kingston House
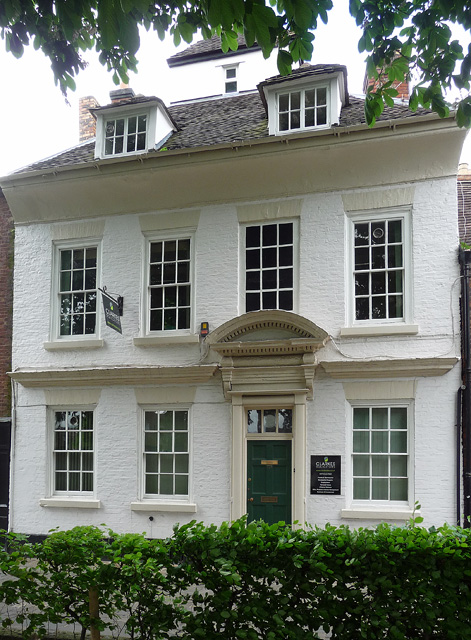
- Kingston House

- Location in Shropshire
- 52.7081°N 2.7526°W
- Location: Shrewsbury, Shropshire, England

History
- Built: 1679

Listed Building – Grade II
- Designated: 10 January 1953
- Reference no.: 1254773

Kingston House is a building in St Alkmund's Place, Shrewsbury. It is a Grade II listed building.

== History ==
The house was built to a timber-frame design and completed in 1679. It has an unusual tower with a pyramid roof. It became a training facility for "friendless girls in moral danger" in 1872, founded by local vicar the Revd Leopold Wightman and his wife Julia, the well-known temperance campaigner. The building went on to become the headquarters of the Shropshire Regiment of Yeomanry Cavalry in the later 19th century. This unit evolved to become the Shropshire Imperial Yeomanry in 1901 and the Shropshire Yeomanry in 1908. By the early 20th century the Divisional Troops of the Royal Artillery and the offices of the Shropshire Territorial Force Association were also based in the building. The Shropshire Yeomanry was mobilised from Kingston House in August 1914 before being deployed to Egypt. After the war the house was decommissioned and converted for commercial use: it is now occupied by a firm of solicitors.
