= Mount Kelly School =

Public School in Tavistock, Devon, England

mount kelly school
- The College

Location
- Parkwood Road; Tavistock, Devon, PL19 0HZ; England; 50.5561°N 4.1354°W

Information
- Type: Public school Private school Boarding and Day School
- Religious affiliation: Church of England
- Established: June 2014; 12 years ago
- Trust: Mount Kelly Foundation
- Department for Education URN: 113573 Tables
- Headmaster: Guy Ayling
- Gender: co-educational
- Age: 3 to 18
- Enrolment: 585 (September 2017)
- Houses: School Houses: Scott (Green) Fry, previously Chichester (Blue) Hepworth (Yellow) Brunell (Red) College; School (Junior Girls), Marwood (Senior Girls), Newton (Junior Boys), Courtenay (Senior Boys) & Conway (Day House)
- Colours: Navy, red and gold
- Song: Eternal Father, Strong to Save
- Publication: Mount Kelly Newsletter
- Alumni: Old Mount Kelleians (OMK)
- Website: mountkelly.com

Mount Kelly School is a co-educational private day and boarding school in the English public school tradition for pupils from 3 to 18, in Tavistock, Devon. The fees are £20,550 – £20,970 pa for day students and £36,780 – £36,960 pa for boarders.

== History ==
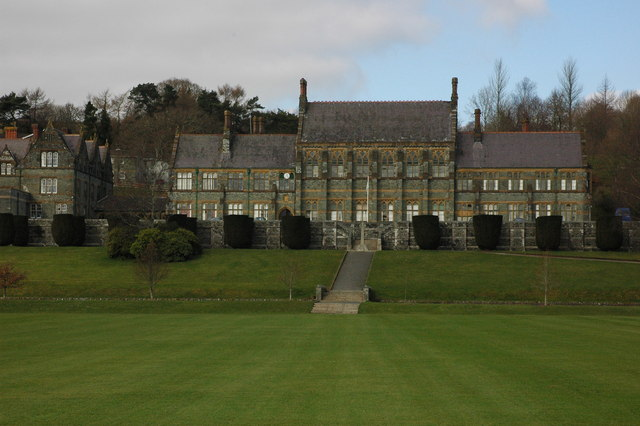

Mount Kelly was established in June 2014 following the merger of two neighbouring schools, Kelly College and Mount House School.

Kelly College was founded in 1877 after Admiral Benedictus Marwood Kelly left the great part of his real and personal estate to trustees, founding a charity which he directed should be called 'The Kelly College', which should be for the education of the 'sons of Naval officers and other gentlemen'.

Mount House School was founded in 1881 by Miss Parker and Miss Tubbs at Alton House, Tavistock Hill, Plymouth. In 1890 the school moved location to North Hill, Plymouth (now the site of St Matthias church hall), moving in 1900 to larger premises at Mount House, Approach Road, Plymouth (the birthplace of Miss Tubbs). Plymouth was heavily bombed in World War II and the school relocated to a 50-acre site at Mount Tavy in 1940. Mount House School became co-educational in 1996 with a pre-prep established for 3- to 7-year-olds ten years later.

== Co-curricular activities ==
The school has a Combined Cadet Force, and runs the Duke of Edinburgh Award scheme.

== Facilities ==
In 2016 the school built a 50-metre, 8-lane Olympic Legacy swimming pool, financed in part by Sport England and the National Lottery (United Kingdom).

== Inspections ==
The school is inspected by the Independent Schools Inspectorate.

- Mount Kelly Foundation ISI Integrated Inspection – March 2015.
- Mount Kelly Foundation ISI Regulatory Compliance Report – March 2018.

== Notable alumni ==
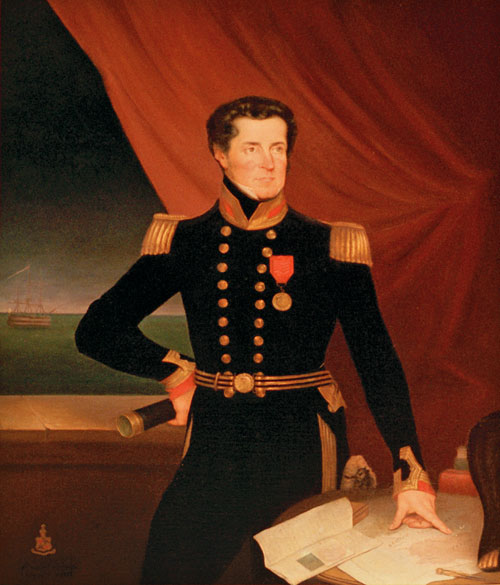
Admiral Benedictus Marwood Kelly as a captain in 1838

=== Mount Kelly ===
- Federico Burdisso, Italian Olympic swimmer
- Gaurika Singh, Nepalese Olympic swimmer
- Daniah Hagul, Libyan Olympic swimmer
