= Mount House School, Tavistock =

Mount House School
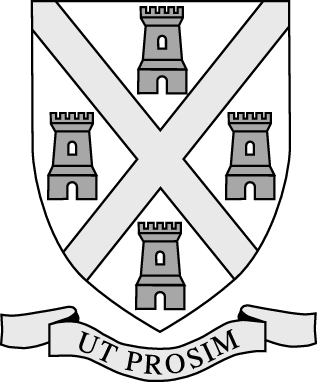
- Tavistock

Information
- Type: Independent school Day and boarding school Co-educational
- Motto: Ut Prosim (That I May Serve)
- Religious affiliation: Church of England
- Established: 1881
- Founder: Miss Parker and Miss Tubbs
- Closed: 2014
- Head Master: Paddy Savage
- Gender: Co-educational
- Age: 3 to 13
- Colours: Black, White, Grey
- Publication: Fanfare
- Former pupils: OMH

Mount House was a coeducational preparatory school situated in the outskirts of Tavistock, Devon. In June 2014, the school formally merged with Kelly College to form Mount Kelly School.

The school had 50 acres (20 ha), including playing fields, set on the edge of Dartmoor and including a stretch of the River Tavy.

== History ==
Mount House School was founded in 1881 by Miss Parker and Miss Tubbs at Alton House, Tavistock Hill, Plymouth. In 1890 the school moved location to North Hill, Plymouth (now the site of St Matthias church hall), moving in 1900 to larger premises at Mount House, Approach Road, Plymouth (Tubbs's birthplace). Plymouth was heavily bombed in World War II and the school re-located to a 50-acre site at Mount Tavy in 1940. The school was considerably developed from 1955 onwards by its last 'owner headmaster' H.P. 'Tony' Wortham, who made it over to a charitable trust on his retirement in 1984. The school subsequently became co-educational in 1996 with a pre-prep established for 3- to 7-year-olds.

The nearby public school Kelly College had often been a destination at age 13 for some Mount House pupils, and the two institutions merged in 2014.

== Facilities ==
Facilities that were available at Mount House:

- All-weather pitch
- 6 grass pitches for rugby, football, cricket and rounders
- 700 square metre indoor sports hall
- 2 squash courts
- Out door cricket nets
- 3 cross country courses
- Netball court
- Tennis court
- 9 hole golf course
- 25m heated outdoor swimming pool
- Theatre
- Boating lake

== Notable former pupils ==
- William Child Villiers, 10th Earl of Jersey, film and TV producer
- Ed Bye, film and TV producer and director
- Philip de Glanville, former England Rugby captain
- Christopher Hitchens, journalist
- Peter Hitchens, author and writer
- Lord David Owen, former Foreign Secretary and Leader of the SDP
- Lewis Pugh, endurance swimmer and ocean advocate
- David Somerset, chief cashier, Bank of England
- Paul Tyler, Liberal Democrat MP for Bodmin
