= Julia Wightman =

Temperance activist and author

- Born: Julia Bainbrigge James; 23 January 1817; Kanpur, Oudh
- Died: 14 January 1898 (aged 80); Shrewsbury, Shropshire, England
- Other name: Mrs. Charles Wightman
- Occupation: Temperance campaigner
- Known for: writing books on Temperance
- Spouse: Charles Wightman (m. 1842; died 1895)

Julia Bainbrigge Wightman (23 January 1817 – 14 January 1898) née Julia Bainbrigge James, was a British philanthropist, writer and Temperance activist. She wrote sometimes as Mrs Charles Wightman. Her profits and the St. Alkmund's Total Abstinence Society paid for "Wightman's Hall" in Shrewsbury and her work was mirrored by other groups inspired by her example.

== Life ==
Wightman was the daughter of Mary (born Marshall) and lieutenant-colonel William James of the East India Company. The family home was Saltford House in Somerset, and they were in Cawnpore on 23 January 1817 when she was born.

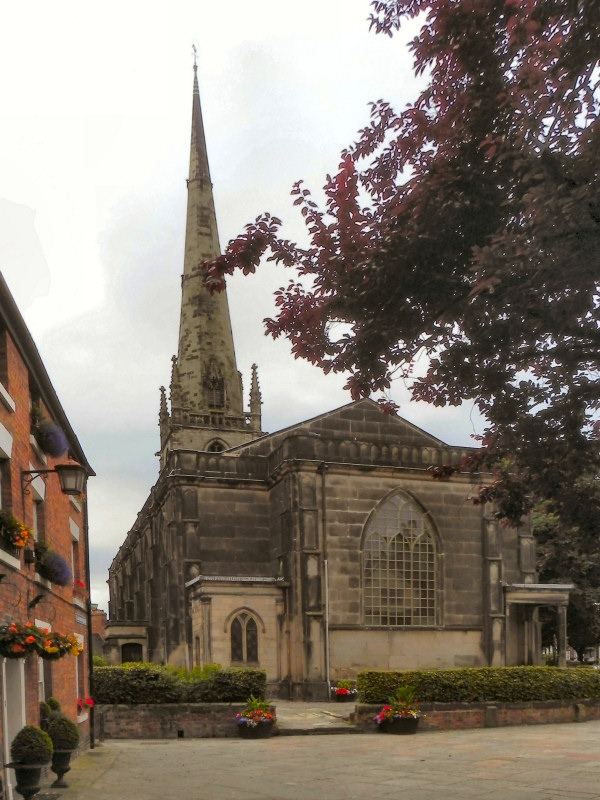
St Alkmund's church in Shrewsbury

She married the Rev. Charles Edward Leopold Wightman in 1842. Whilst supporting his work at St. Alkmund's church in Shrewsbury, she would encourage people to "sign the pledge". This was a temperance device where people would sign to say that they would give up alcohol completely. She could not understand the need for this as she would have preferred people to be moderate, but she could see that many could not resist. Wightman wanted them to be good Christians and she saw that sobriety was a secondary but essential prerequisite for some men. She discussed these ideas in letters she exchanged with the writer Catherine Marsh and her sister. She could see how soldiers billeted in Shrewsbury would quickly exchange their pay for alcohol and the army only encouraged it by billeting new soldiers in taverns. Wives would meet their husbands on pay day to intercept the wages into the family purse before their men went to the pub.

She was pressed to write something to assist in the work. She gathered together copies of her letters and quickly assembled them into a book which she titled Haste to the Rescue. It was published for "the educated classes" in 1859 and sold 28,000 copies in just over a year. The public were keen to read more from the woman who was trying to prevent drunkenness and they bought 6,000 copies of her follow up book Annals of the Rescued.

Her profits of £700 paid for the land of an ex-tavern in Shrewsbury to be bought and an alcohol-free hall was constructed in Princess Street. The design was by local architect John L. Randal and another £2,000 was paid by the Rev. C. E. L. Wightman and the St. Alkmund's Total Abstinence Society. This soon became a community centre where there were showers, meals, lectures and a reading room with free newspapers. Bible classes and a ragged school were also offered. She and her husband founded the "Salop Home" for local "fallen women" and, in 1872, Dogpole Training Home for the "Care of Friendless Girls", in a building later called Kingston House, both in Shrewsbury, which were still active after her death. Many other women's groups formed to mirror her success and opened halls for working men. 1860 Photograph of Julia Wightman taken by photographer Groom in Shrewsbury In 1872, she was invited to speak at the conference of the National Temperance League. She told the story of Molly, a drunkard, who was received with kindness at her vicarage and in time signed the pledge. The following year she published, More than Conqueror, a life of John Woodford who had been the secretary of the Shrewsbury YMCA. The future MP for Scarborough William Sproston Caine was brought up as a Baptist under the ministry of Hugh Stowell Brown. Caine would tell the story of how he sat down to drink sherry whilst reading a Temperance book by Wightman. He was so persuaded by what he read that he never drank again and became an advocate for Temperance.

== Death and legacy ==
Wightman became widowed on the death of her husband in 1895. She died on 14 January 1898, after a week's illness, at her home in The Crescent, Shrewsbury, and was buried in Shrewsbury General Cemetery (Plot No 70), in her husband's grave on 18 January 1898. In her will she left charitable legacies to the YMCA and YWCA, the Salop Home and Dogpole Training School, Salop Infirmary and Shrewsbury Eye Hospital. "Wightman's Hall" remained as a "Working Man's Hall" until the Second World War when it was converted into a theatre. The building remains behind a facade of shops.
