= William Marsh (priest) =

British priest and writer

William Marsh (1775–1864) was a British priest in the Church of England and a writer of theological publications, in the 19th century. He was the vicar in St Peters, Colchester where his daughter, Catherine Marsh, the writer was born.

== Life ==
=== Early years ===
He was the third son of Catherine (born Case) and Colonel Sir Charles Marsh of Reading. He was born on 20 July 1775, and educated at Reading Grammar School, under Richard Valpy. He was moved by witnessing the sudden death of a young man in a ball-room. Under the influence of the Rev. William Bromley Cadogan of St Giles's Church, Reading, he decided to abandon plans for a military career, and go into the Church.

Marsh matriculated at St Edmund Hall, Oxford on 10 October 1797, graduating B.A. in 1801, M.A. 1807, and B.D. and D.D. in 1839. At Christmas 1800 he was ordained to the curacy of St. Lawrence, Reading, and was soon known as an impressive preacher of evangelical doctrines.

=== Life in the church ===
In 1801 Thomas Stonor, father of Thomas, Lord Camoys, gave him the chapelry of Nettlebed in Oxfordshire. His father presented him to the united livings of Basildon and Ashampstead in Berkshire in 1802, when he resigned Nettlebed, but retained the curacy of St. Lawrence, which he served gratuitously for many years. The Rev. Charles Simeon paid a first visit to Basildon in 1807, and was from that time a friend and correspondent of Marsh. In 1809, with the consent of his bishop, he became vicar of St. James's, Brighton, but the vicar of Brighton, Dr. R. C. Carr, afterwards bishop of Worcester, refused his assent to this arrangement, and after some months Marsh resigned. Simeon presented him to St. Peter's, Colchester, in 1814. His attention was early called by Simeon to the subject of the conversion of the Jews, and in 1818 he went with him to the Netherlands to enquire into their condition in that country.

Ill-health obliged him in 1829 to leave Colchester, and in October of the same year he accepted the rectory of St. Thomas, Birmingham, where from the frequent subject of his sermons he came to be known as 'Millennial Marsh'. Early in 1837 he was appointed principal official and commissary of the royal peculiar of the deanery of Bridgnorth; and in 1839, finally leaving Birmingham, he became incumbent of St. Mary, Leamington.

=== Later years and legacy ===
From 1848 he was an honorary canon of Worcester, and from 1860 to his death rector of Beddington, Surrey. Few men preached a greater number of sermons. His conciliatory manners gained him friends among all denominations. He died at Beddington rectory on 24 August 1864.

== Works ==
Besides numerous addresses, lectures, single sermons, speeches, introductions, and prefaces, Marsh printed:

1. A Short Catechism on the Collects, Colchester, 1821; third ed. 1824.
2. Select Passages from the Sermons and Conversations of a Clergyman [i.e. W. Marsh], 1823; another ed. 1828.
3. The Criterion. By J. Douglas, revised and abridged, 1824.
4. A few Plain Thoughts on Prophecy, particularly as it relates to the Latter Days, Colchester, 1840; third ed. 1843.
5. The Jews, or the Voice of the New Testament concerning them, Leamington, 1841.
6. Justification, or a Short Easy Method of ascertaining the Scriptural View of that important Doctrine, 1842.
7. Passages from Letters by a Clergyman on Jewish Prophetical and Scriptural Subjects, 1845.
8. The Church of Rome in the Days of St. Paul, lectures, 1853; two numbers only.
9. Invitation to United Prayer for the Outpouring of the Holy Spirit, 1854. Similar invitations were issued in 1857, 1859, 1862, and 1863.
10. The Right Choice, or the Difference between Worldly Diversions and Rational Recreations, 1857; another ed. 1859.
11. The Duty and Privilege of Prayer, 1859.
12. Eighty-sixth Birthday. Address on Spiritual Prosperity, 1861.
13. An Earnest Exhortation to Christians to Pray for the Pope, 1864.
14. A Brief Exposition of St. Paul's Epistle to the Romans, 1865.

== Family ==
Marsh was married three times: first, in November 1806, to Maria, daughter of John Tilson and sister of Christopher Chowne—she died 24 July 1833; secondly, on 21 April 1840, to Lady Louisa, third daughter of Charles, first earl of Cadogan—she died in August 1843; thirdly, on 3 March 1848, to the Honourable Louisa Horatia Powys, seventh daughter of Thomas Powys, 2nd Baron Lilford. Mackenzie Dalzell Chalmers was his grandson. He had five children and the fourth Catherine Marsh lived with him. She would write his biography and before he died she began her success as a published author.
