= St Mary's Church, Saltford =

Church in Somerset, England

St Mary's Church
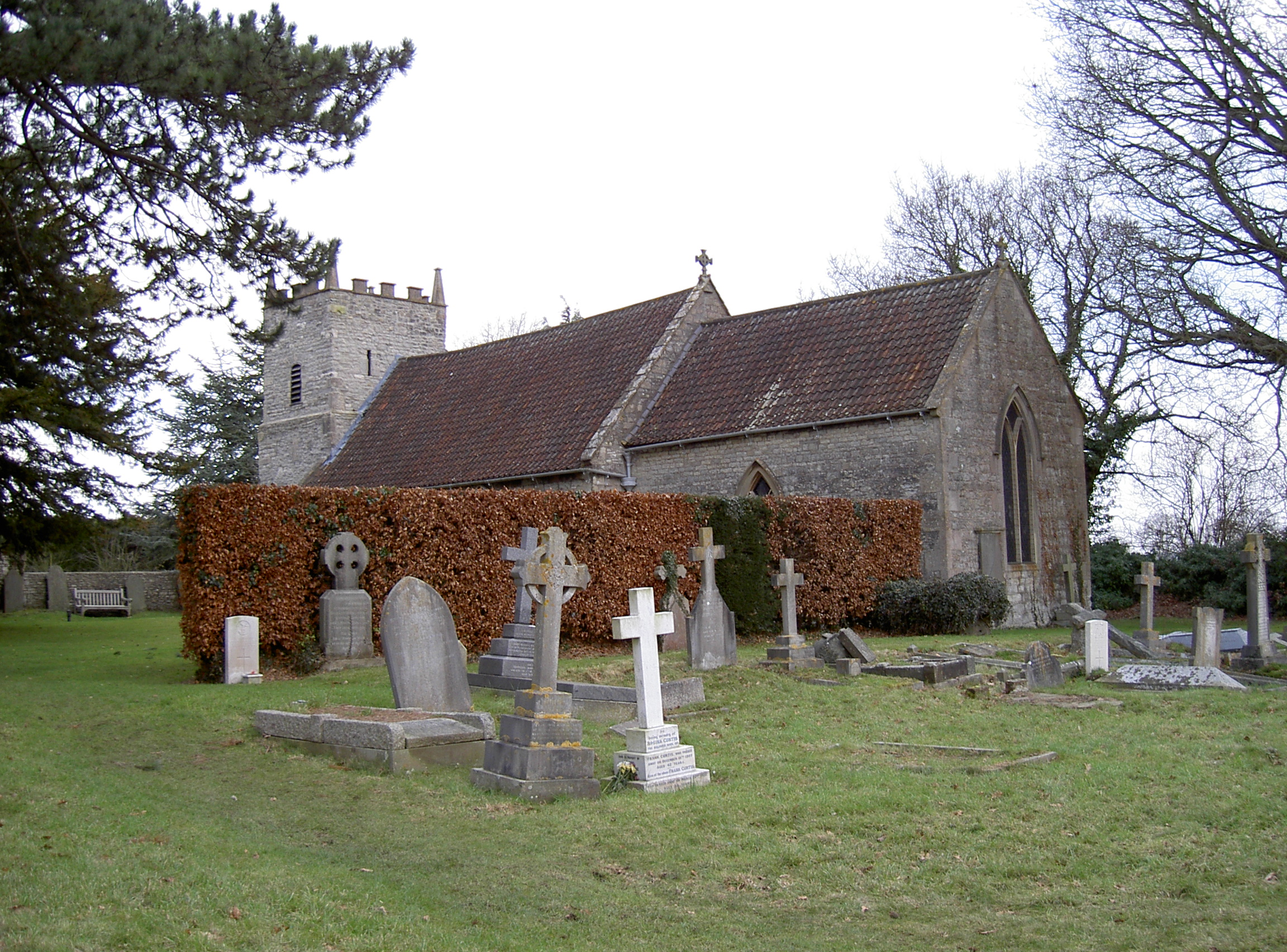

- Location within Somerset

General information
- Location: Saltford, England
- Coordinates: 51.4056°N 2.4542°W
- Completed: 12th century

St Mary's Church is an Anglican parish church in Saltford, Somerset, England. It dates from the 12th century or earlier and has been designated as a Grade II listed building.

== History ==
This church has stood in the village of Saltford for over a thousand years. It is believed to be Norman with an authentic Norman Font still used for christenings today. It was taken away and defaced during the Battle of Lansdown during the English Civil War. The font was subsequently found being used as a cattle trough. The rector at the time was never seen again. The tower is believed to be Saxon although 10 feet (3.0 m) have been added and extensively repaired. Originally there were three bells dated 1820, although only one remains and still used. The gallery and porch are 19th-century and is where the organ is. More recently, a window has been added in memorial of the choirmaster for 10 years, Mr. T.C.G. Ewins.

== Current Information ==
The current rector is The Reverend Daile Wilshere. She succeeds The Reverend G. Richard W. Hall, who served as Rector between 1988 and 2014. The church has many youth groups and other resident groups and initiatives. The Choir sings at most Parish Communion services. The church holds close links with Saltford Church of England Primary School, where the Rector speaks at Assembly every Monday Afternoon.

== The Church Hall ==
The former village school has been converted into a Church Hall, with a spacious Main Hall, full kitchen facilities and 3 different smaller rooms. Local Groups hire these rooms; with revenue going to the church.

== The Benefice, Deanery and Diocese ==
Saltford is part of the Benefice of Saltford, All Saints Church, Corston and Holy Trinity in Newton St Loe, as well as the Diocese of Bath & Wells (in the Archdiocese of Canterbury) and the Deanery of Chew Magna. The church's sister parish, Newton-St-Loe, is in the patronage of the Duchy of Cornwall.

== See also ==
- List of ecclesiastical parishes in the Diocese of Bath and Wells
