= Hedley Vicars =

British Army officer and evangelical (1826-1855)

- Born: Hedley Shafto Johnstone Vicars; 7 December 1826; Mauritius
- Died: 22 March 1855 (aged 28)
- Military career
- Allegiance: United Kingdom
- Branch: British Army
- Unit: 97th (The Earl of Ulster's) Regiment of Foot
- Conflicts: Crimean War: Siege of Sebastopol

Hedley Shafto Johnstone Vicars (7 December 1826 – 22 March 1855) was a British Army officer and evangelical who was killed in action during the Crimean War.

== Life ==
Vicars was born in Mauritius on 7 December 1826, where his father, Captain Richard John Vicars, (d. 1839), a captain in the Royal Engineers, was then stationed. His mother Marianne Williams was a native of Newfoundland. He was the eldest of several siblings.

After passing his examinations at Woolwich on 22 December 1843 he received a commission in the 97th Foot, and in the following year proceeded to Corfu. On 6 November 1846 he obtained his lieutenancy. In 1848 his regiment was removed to Jamaica, and in 1851 to Nova Scotia.

In November of that year his mind took a serious turn, and henceforward his character was changed. He associated with Dr. Twining, the garrison chaplain at Halifax, became a Sunday-school teacher, visited the sick, and took every opportunity of reading the scriptures and praying with the men of his company.

In 1852 he became adjutant of his regiment. In May 1853 the regiment returned to England, and in August he resigned the adjutancy. He also became a frequent attendant of meetings held at Exeter Hall and an active member of the Soldiers' Friendly Society, besides holding meetings with railway navvies on many occasions.

Before his regiment left England for the Crimea, early in 1854, it was reported that "since Mr. Vicars became so good, he has steadied about four hundred men in the regiment." At the Piraeus many men of the 97th died of cholera, and Vicars while conducting the burial parties took every opportunity of addressing the spectators at the graves.

On 3 November 1854 he was promoted to the rank of captain. On 20 November 1854 he landed in the Crimea, and, with his regiment, took part in the Siege of Sebastopol. Here he continued his religious work, holding prayer meetings in his tent, visiting the sick in the hospitals, and carefully looking after his men.

On the night of 22 March 1855, while he was in the trenches, the Russians made a sortie in force from Sebastopol, and, taking the English by surprise, drove them out of their trenches. Vicars, keeping his men in hand, fired a volley into the enemy at twenty paces, and then 'charging' with the 97th he drove the Russians back and regained possession of the trenches.

He was killed in a sortie by the Russians from Sebastopol, 22 March 1855. He cut down two men with his own hand before he fell, bayoneted and shot through the right shoulder. He was buried on the following day on the Woronzoff road, close to the milestone.

In his despatch on 6 April, Lord Raglan made special mention of Vicars' gallantry.

The Memorials of Captain Hedley Vicars (with a portrait and a view of his grave), by the author of 'The Victory Won,’ i.e. Catherine M. Marsh, was published soon after his death. The memorials are dedicated "to her whom God graciously chose to sow in his young heart its first imperishable seed." It had a large circulation, and was translated into French, German, Swedish and Italian.
