= Benedictus Marwood Kelly =

Royal Navy Admiral (1785–1867)

Admiral Benedictus Marwood Kelly
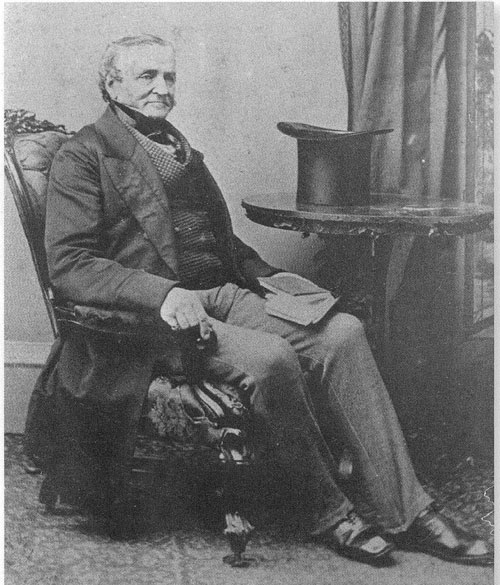
- Benedictus Marwood Kelly in the 1850s
- Born: 3 February 1785; Holsworthy, Devon
- Died: 26 September 1867 (aged 82); Saltford House, Saltford
- Burial place: Kelly, Devon
- Military career
- Allegiance: United Kingdom of Great Britain and Ireland
- Branch: Royal Navy
- Service years: 1798 – 1867
- Rank: Admiral
- Commands: HMS Dasher; HMS Pheasant
- Conflicts: French Revolutionary Wars; Napoleonic Wars; Invasion of Java

Benedictus Marwood Kelly (3 February 1785 – 26 September 1867) was an officer of the Royal Navy. He rose to the rank of admiral after service in the French Revolutionary and Napoleonic Wars.

== Family and early life ==
Kelly was born in Holsworthy, Devon on 3 February 1785 and baptised on 1 September 1790. He was the son of Benedictus Marwood Kelly (1752–1836) lawyer and private banker, and Mary Coham. He entered the Royal Navy on 19 October 1798 as an able seaman aboard HMS Niger, serving under Captain Philip Wodehouse. He moved with Wodehouse to the 28-gun HMS Volage and then to the 80-gun HMS Gibraltar in November 1799, under the command of his uncle, Captain William Hancock Kelly. Benedictus spent the next six years aboard her, and in her assisted at the capture of Admiral Jean-Baptiste Perrée's squadron of three frigates and two brigs on 19 June 1799. He attended the expedition of 1800 and 1801 to Ferrol and Egypt, and was wounded in a boat attack on the French defences at Portoferraio on the island of Elba. He spent some time on the books of the 100-gun HMS Royal William, the flagship of Admiral George Montagu and the 74-gun HMS Swiftsure under Captain Mark Robinson.

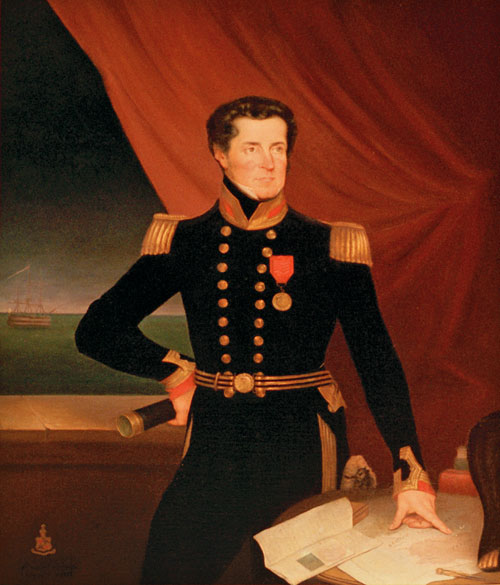
As a captain in 1838

Kelly returned to serve under his uncle in October 1804, now in command of the 98-gun HMS Temeraire. He remained aboard Temeraire after William Kelly was superseded by Captain Eliab Harvey, and on 12 January 1805 was appointed a sub-lieutenant aboard a schooner. He was commissioned as lieutenant on 31 January 1806 and appointed to the 50-gun HMS Adamant. Adamant was ordered to escort a convoy of East Indiamen as far as the Cape of Good Hope and on 6 May 1806 he assisted in the capture of the 30-gun Spanish frigate Reparadora. In August 1807 he moved to the 32-gun HMS Daedalus and served under a succession of commanders, Frederick Warren, William Ward, and Samuel Hood Inglefield. Under Inglefield Kelly was present with the squadron under Charles Dashwood in an attack on the town of Samaná in San Domingo on 11 November 1808. The town was captured and the 5-gun privateers Guerrière and Exchange were also taken. Kelly was then given command of the boats of Daedalus and the frigate HMS Aurora and sent to chase down and capture the officers and men of the privateers, who had escaped upriver. Kelly was successful in this endeavour, capturing them all after four days of tracking and a fierce skirmish.

== Promotion ==
From Daedalus Kelly moved to become first lieutenant of the 64-gun HMS Polyphemus in March 1810. Polyphemus was the flagship of Vice-Admiral Bartholomew Rowley, who died during his posting. Kelly was sent home with the despatches aboard HMS Bramble. He captained the 18-gun sloop HMS Dasher during the Invasion of Java between August and September 1811, and was promoted to commander on 28 November 1811. He then spent a period on half-pay without active employment, despite petitioning the Admiralty for a posting during the War of 1812 and Lord Exmouth's expedition to Algiers.

Kelly was finally given a seagoing commander with an appointment to the 22-gun HMS Pheasant on 22 September 1818. He served off the coast of Africa until February 1822. For his good service here he was promoted to captain, post-dated to 19 July 1821.

== Family and later life ==
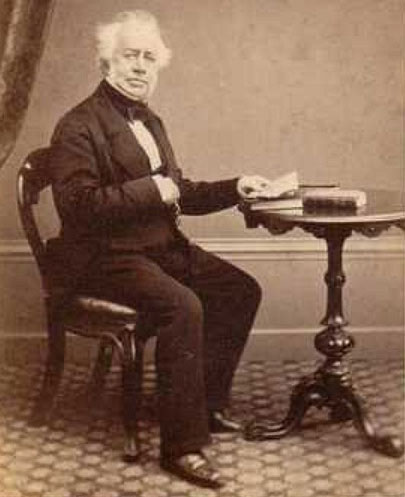
in the 1860s

Kelly then retired from active service in the Navy on the grounds of ill health and pursued a successful career in the City of London where he was a director of the London Brighton and South Coast Railway and the Bristol and Exeter Railway. He was promoted to the rank of rear-admiral on the reserved list on 8 March 1852; and vice-admiral on 2 October 1857, and finally admiral on 27 April 1863. He was twice married, having first married Mary Ann Price, eldest daughter and heir of Richard Price, banker, of Duke Street, Westminster, and Highfields Park, Withyham, Sussex at St Margaret's Church, Westminster on 31 August 1837. She died in childbirth on 14 July 1838. His second wife was Juliana Boyd (1803–1896), eldest daughter of William Boyd, banker and coal owner, of Burfield Priory, Gloucestershire, on 7 August 1855 in St. Andrew's Church, Newcastle upon Tyne. They left no children.

Admiral Kelly died at Saltford House in the village of Saltford, near Bath, Somerset, on 26 September 1867. He left £200,000 for the establishment of Kelly College, built at Tavistock, as a boarding school "for the sons of Naval Officers and other gentlemen".
