= John Reade (disambiguation) =

John Reade was a Canadian writer.

John Reade may also refer to:

- John Reade (politician) (died 1557)
- John Edmund Reade (1800–1870), English poet and novelist
- Sir John Reade, 1st Baronet (c. 1616–1694)
- Sir John Reade, 3rd Baronet (1691–1712) of the Reade baronets
- Sir John Reade, 5th Baronet (1721–1773) of the Reade baronets
- Sir John Reade, 6th Baronet (1762–1789) of the Reade baronets
- Sir John Chandos Reade, 7th Baronet (1785–1868) of the Reade baronets
- Sir John Reade, 11th Baronet (1896–1958) of the Reade baronets

== See also ==
- John Read (disambiguation)
- John Rede (disambiguation)
- John Reed (disambiguation)
- John Reid (disambiguation)
