= John Reid =

John Reid may refer to:

== Politics ==
- John Reid, Baron Reid of Cardowan (born 1947), British Home Secretary
- John William Reid (1821–1881), U.S. Representative from Missouri
- John Dowsley Reid (1859–1929), Canadian parliamentarian and Cabinet minister
- John C. W. Reid (1871–1942), Canadian politician in Manitoba
- John Mercer Reid (1937–2022), Information Commissioner of Canada and a former MP
- Sir John Reid, 2nd Baronet (1791–1867), MP for Dover, 1830–1831 and 1832–1847
- John Flaws Reid (1860–1943), Scottish-born farmer and politician in Saskatchewan
- John Reid (Australian politician) (1873–1963), New South Wales MLA
- John Christian Reid (1873–1932), New South Wales businessman, yachtsman and alderman
- Jack Reid (politician) (1942–2022), member of the Virginia House of Delegates
- John Frederick Reid, Canadian politician
- John Reid (Virginia politician), American politician, Republican Party candidate for lieutenant governor of Virginia

== Sports ==
=== Association football ===
- John Reid (footballer, born 1932) (1932–2021), played for Hamilton Academical
- John M. Reid (footballer) (fl. 1952–1956), played for Dunfermline Athletic and Queen's Park
- Johnny Reid (footballer) (1896–1980), Scottish soccer inside right

=== Cricket ===
- John Richard Reid (1928–2020), captain of the New Zealand cricket team
- John Fulton Reid (1956–2020), New Zealand cricketer
- John Reid (umpire) (1874–1948), South African cricket umpire

=== Gridiron football ===
- John B. Reid (1896–1963), American football player and sports coach
- John Reid (American football) (born 1996), American football cornerback

=== Other sports ===
- John Reid (jockey) (born 1955), British jockey and president of the Jockeys Association
- John Reid (sailor) (1918–1954), American Olympic sailor
- John Reid (Australian footballer) (born 1953), Australian rules footballer
- John Reid (golfer) (c. 1870–1946), Scottish professional golfer
- John Reid (rugby union), Irish international rugby union player
- James Reid (athlete) (John James Reid), British Olympic racewalker

== Media ==
- Andrew Tobias (born 1947), American journalist who used the pseudonym John Reid
- John Reid (music manager) (born 1949), Scottish judge on the Australian TV The X Factor
- Johnny Reid (born 1974), country music singer
- John Robinson Reid (1963–2025), Scottish producer, DJ, vocalist and member of Nightcrawlers

== Other ==
- John E. Reid and Associates, owner of the Reid technique of questioning suspects
- John G. Reid, Canadian historian
- John Reid (priest), 15th-century Scottish priest and courtier, known as Stobo, a lost poet
- John Reid (British Army officer) (1721–1807), funded a chair in Music at the University of Edinburgh
- John Reid (minister) (1800–1867), Scottish-Australian Presbyterian minister
- John Reid (businessman) (1840–1916), Scottish-American businessman and golfer
- John Reid (pharmacologist) (born 1943), British clinical pharmacologist
- John Reid (physiologist) (1809–1849), Scottish physician and academic
- John Reid (physician) (1776–1822), English doctor
- John Reid (cartoonist) (born 1968), Dutch cartoonist and judge
- John Reid (publisher) (1808 – c. 1840), Scottish author
- Lone Ranger, fictional character whose true name is often given as John Reid
- John Reid (New Zealand academic) (1916–1972), professor of English
- John Reid (bishop) (1928–2016), suffragan bishop in the Anglican Diocese of Sydney
- John Reid (conservationist), founder and president of the Conservation Strategy Fund
- John Robertson Reid (1851–1926), Scottish painter
- John Reid (merchant) (18th century), Scottish associate of Daniel Beale and John Henry Cox
- John Reid (diplomat) (1901–1985), New Zealand diplomat
- John S. Reid (1784–1816), American lawyer and aide-de-camp
- John W. Reid Jr. (1879–1968), American architect

== See also ==
- John Reed (disambiguation)
- John Read (disambiguation)
- John Rede (disambiguation)
- John Reade (disambiguation)
