= John Read =

John Read may refer to:

== Politicians ==
- John Read (Mississippi politician) (born 1941), member of the Mississippi House of Representatives
- John Read (Connecticut politician) (1633–1730), member of the Connecticut House of Representatives from Norwalk
- John Read (Australian politician) (born 1939), member of the Legislative Assembly of Western Australia
- John Read (New Zealand politician) (1874–1942), local body politician and trade unionist
- J. Meredith Read (1837–1896), United States diplomat
- John Kingsley Read (1936–1985), chairman of the British National Front and a founder of the National Party
- John Milton Read (1842–1881), American printer and politician

== Others ==
- John Read (pirate) (fl. 1683–1688), British privateer, buccaneer, and pirate
- John Read (chemist) (1884–1963), British chemist
- John M. Read (1797–1874), American lawyer
- John Read (British Army officer) (1917–1987)
- John Read (businessman) (1918–2015), British businessman
- John Read (lawyer) (1769–1854), United States lawyer and banker
- John Read (producer) (1920–2006), collaborator with Gerry Anderson
- John Read (surgeon) (fl. 1588), English medical writer
- John Read (art film maker) (1923–2011), producer of art documentaries for the BBC from 1951 to 1983
- John Read (psychologist), psychologist and mental health researcher
- John Read (skier) (born 1961), British Olympic skier
- John Erskine Read (1888–1973), Canadian lawyer, academic, civil servant, and judge
- John Read (inventor), inventor who developed a rotating doubler electrostatic generator
- John Dawson Read, English singer-songwriter
- John Read (snooker player), English snooker player
- John Read (bobsleigh) (1926–2000), British bobsledder
- John D. Read (1814–1864), American abolitionist and lay preacher

== Jack Read ==
- Jack Read (coastwatcher) (1905–1992), coastwatcher during World War II
- Jack Read (rugby) (fl. 1925–1936), rugby union and rugby league footballer

== See also ==
- John Reed (disambiguation)
- John Reid (disambiguation)
- John Reade (disambiguation)
- John Rede (disambiguation)
- Jack Reid (disambiguation)
