= John Reed =

John Reed may refer to:

== Arts, letters, and entertainment ==
- John Reed (actor) (1916–2010), English actor and singer with the D'Oyly Carte Opera Company
- John Reed (animator) (1908–1992), American animator and painter
- John Reed (art patron) (1901–1981), Australian critic and art patron
- John Reed (journalist) (1887–1920), American journalist and Communist activist
- John Reed (novelist) (born 1969), American novelist and author
- John O. Reed (1929–2012), British anthologist and translator of African literature
- John Shelton Reed (born 1942), American sociologist and essayist

== Business and finance ==
- John Reed, American miner, founder of the Reed Gold Mine in North Carolina
- John S. Reed (born 1939), American financier
- John Shedd Reed (1917–2008), American chairman of Santa Fe Industries, president of Shedd Aquarium
- John T. Reed (born 1946), American real estate investor and author

== Politics ==
- Sir John Blake-Reed (1882–1966), British judge
- Jack Reed (Rhode Island politician) (born 1949), born John Francis Reed, United States Senator from Rhode Island
- John Reed (Connecticut politician) (1633–1730), American politician, member of the Connecticut House of Representatives from Norwalk
- John Reed (judge) (1864–1955), New Zealand judge
- John Reed Jr. (1781–1860), American politician from Massachusetts, son of John Reed Sr. (below), entered Congress in 1813
- John Reed Sr. (1751–1831), American politician from Massachusetts, left Congress in 1801
- John A. Reed Jr. (1931–2015), American lawyer and judge
- John H. Reed (1921–2012), American politician, 66th governor of Maine

== Sports ==
- Jack Reed (baseball) (1933–2022), born John Burwell Reed, American outfielder for the New York Yankees, 1961–1963
- John M. Reed (c. 1881 – 1934), American college sports coach
- John Reed (footballer) (born 1972), English footballer who played primarily for Sheffield United
- Johnny Reed, American baseball player

== Others ==
- John Reed (early Californian) (1805–1843), American early California settler and noted landowner in Marin County
- John Reed (fur trader) (died 1814), American fur trader
- John Reed (priest) (born 1951), English Archdeacon of Taunton
- John C. Reed (born 1958), American medical researcher
- John Oren Reed (1856–1916), American physicist and university dean
- John W. Reed (1918–2018), American law professor and dean

== See also ==
- John Reed Swanton (1873–1958), American anthropologist, folklorist, and linguist
- Jack Reed (disambiguation)
- John Reid (disambiguation)
- John Read (disambiguation)
- John Rede (disambiguation)
- John Reade (disambiguation)
