= John Rede (disambiguation) =

John Rede (before 1509–1557) was an English politician and royal tutor.

John Rede may also refer to:

- John Rede (died 1404), MP for Oxfordshire
- John Rede (1440-1502), businessman and politician based in Norwich and Beccles
- John Rede (died 1570), MP for Cricklade

== See also ==
- John Read (disambiguation)
- John Reade (disambiguation)
- John Reed (disambiguation)
- John Reid (disambiguation)
