= Sir Thomas Reade, 4th Baronet =

British courtier and Whig politician

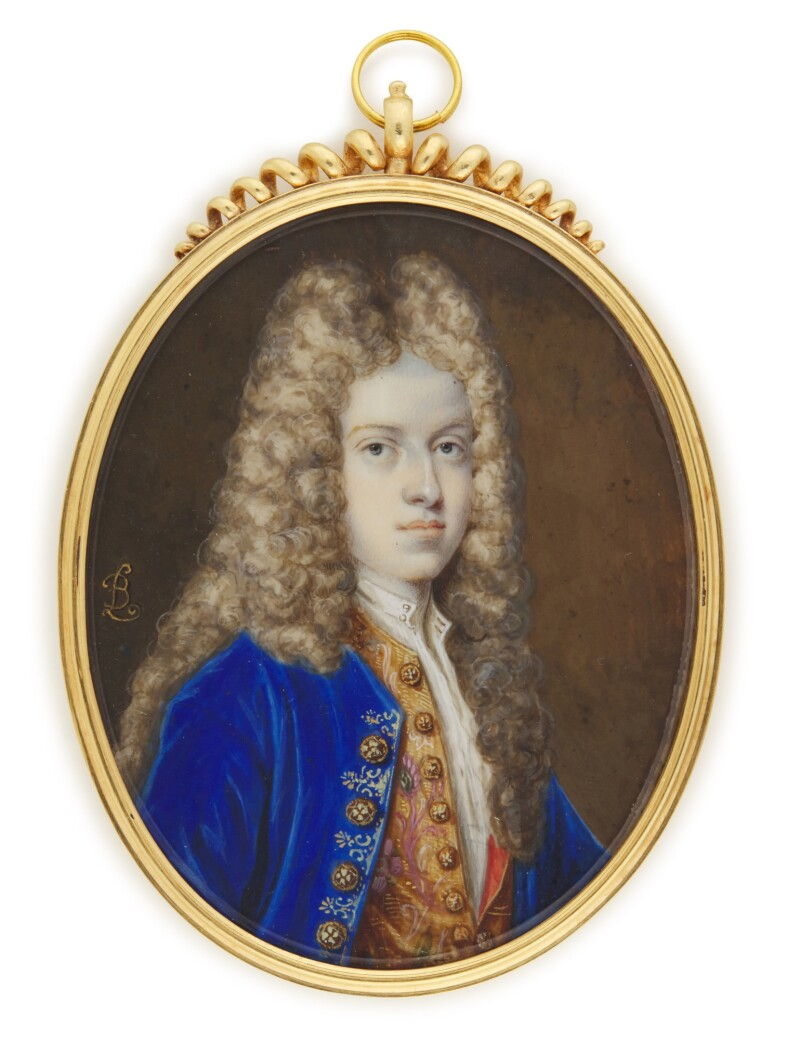
Portrait of Sir Thomas Reade, 4th Bt

Sir Thomas Reade, 4th Baronet (c. 1684 – 1752) of Shipton Court, Oxfordshire was a British courtier and Whig politician who sat in the House of Commons for 34 years from 1713 to 1747.

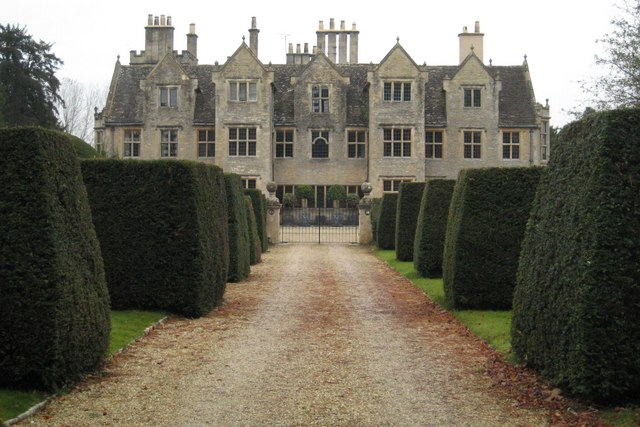
Shipton Court

Reade was the second son of Sir Edward Reade, 2nd Baronet, of Shipton Court, and his wife Elizabeth Harby, daughter of Edward Harby of Adstone, Northamptonshire. He was the elder brother of Lieutenant-general George Reade. He succeeded to the baronetcy and Shipton Court on the death of his elder brother, Sir Winwood Reade, 3rd Baronet, on 30 June 1692. He married Jane Mary Dutton, the daughter of Sir Ralph Dutton, 1st Baronet, MP of Sherborne, Gloucestershire, on 29 October 1719.

Reade first stood for Parliament at a by-election for Oxfordshire in February 1710 and was heavily defeated. At the 1713 general election, he was elected Member of Parliament for Cricklade.

Reade was returned unopposed at Cricklade at the 1715 general election, but faced contests at the succeeding general elections of 1722, 1727 and 1734. At the 1741 general election he was caught up in a double return and was declared elected on 24 December 1741. He did not stand at the 1747 general election.

Reade served as Clerk of the Household to Prince of Wales from about 1722 to 1727 and was promoted to Clerk of the Green Cloth when the Prince of Wales became King in 1727 to his death.

Reade died on 25 September 1752, and was referred to by Henry Pelham as ‘an old servant of the King’s, and a very honest man, but he has been declining for many years’. He and his wife had only one child, John, who succeeded him in the baronetcy.

Parliament of Great Britain
Preceded by Edmund Dunch; Samuel Robinson	Member of Parliament for Cricklade; 1713–1747; With: William Gore 1713-1714; Samuel Robinson 1714-1715; Jacob Sawbridge 1715-1721; Hon. Matthew Ducie Moreton 1721-1722; Thomas Gore 1722-1727; Christopher Tilson 1727-1734; William Gore 1734-1739; Charles Gore 1739-1741; Welbore Ellis 1741-1747	Succeeded by William Rawlinson Earle; Lieutenant-Colonel John Gore
Baronetage of England
Preceded by Winwood Reade	Baronet (of Barton); 1692-1752	Succeeded by John Reade
