= Taft Tunnel =

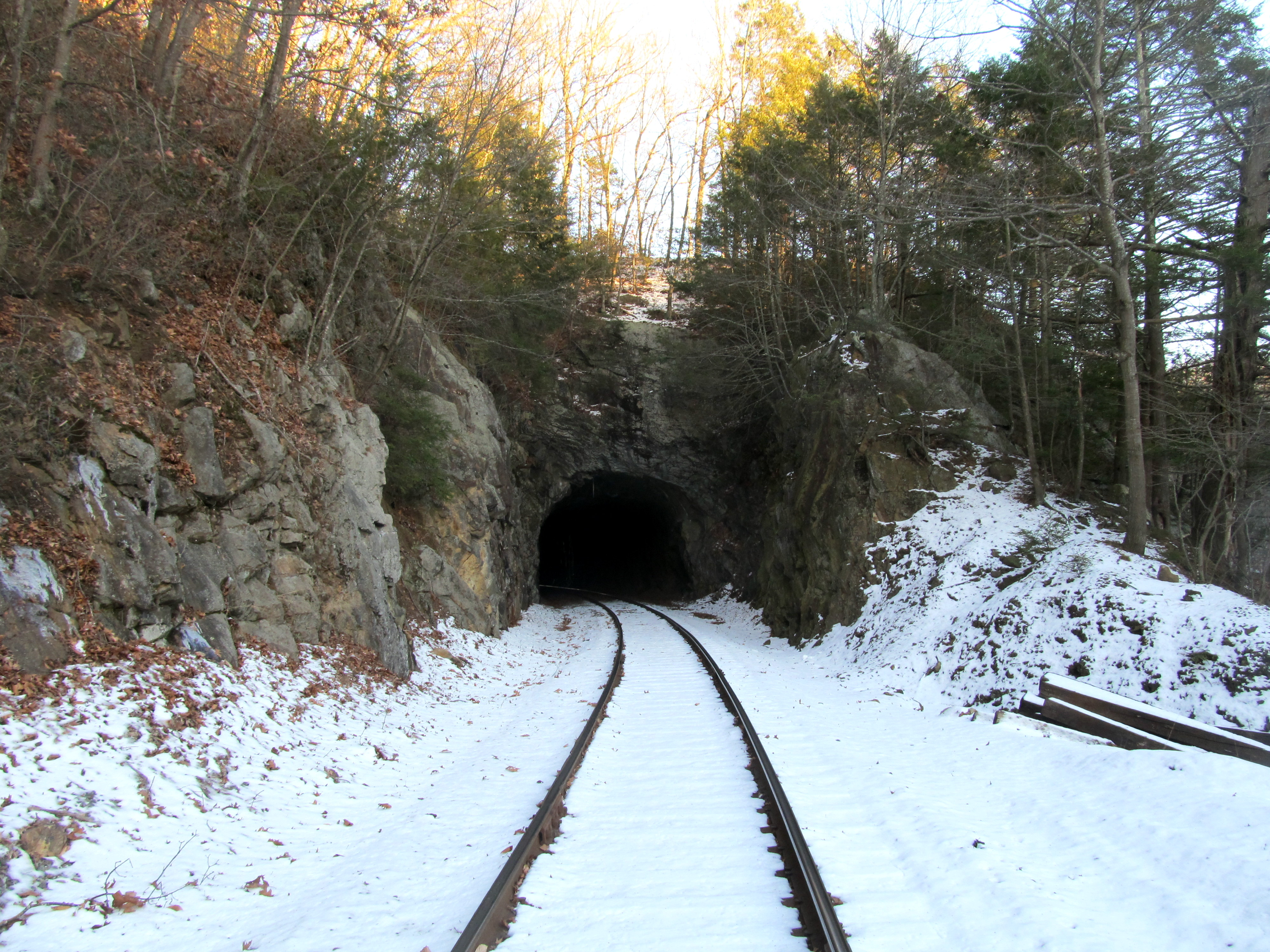
- West portal of the tunnel in December 2017
- Interactive map of Taft Tunnel

Overview
- Location: Lisbon, Connecticut, United States
- Coordinates: 41.5544°N 72.036°W

Operation
- Opened: September 1839
- Owner: Providence & Worcester RR
- Character: Rail

Technical
- Length: 300 feet (90 m)
- No. of tracks: 1
- Track gauge: Standard
- Electrified: Formerly (for Connecticut Company streetcars)

Taft Tunnel is a railroad tunnel in the northeast United States, located in the southwest part of Lisbon, Connecticut. Completed in 1837, it was the first common carrier railroad tunnel built in the United States, though it was not used until 1839 (before which several other tunnels were in use). It is still in use in its original form.

== History ==
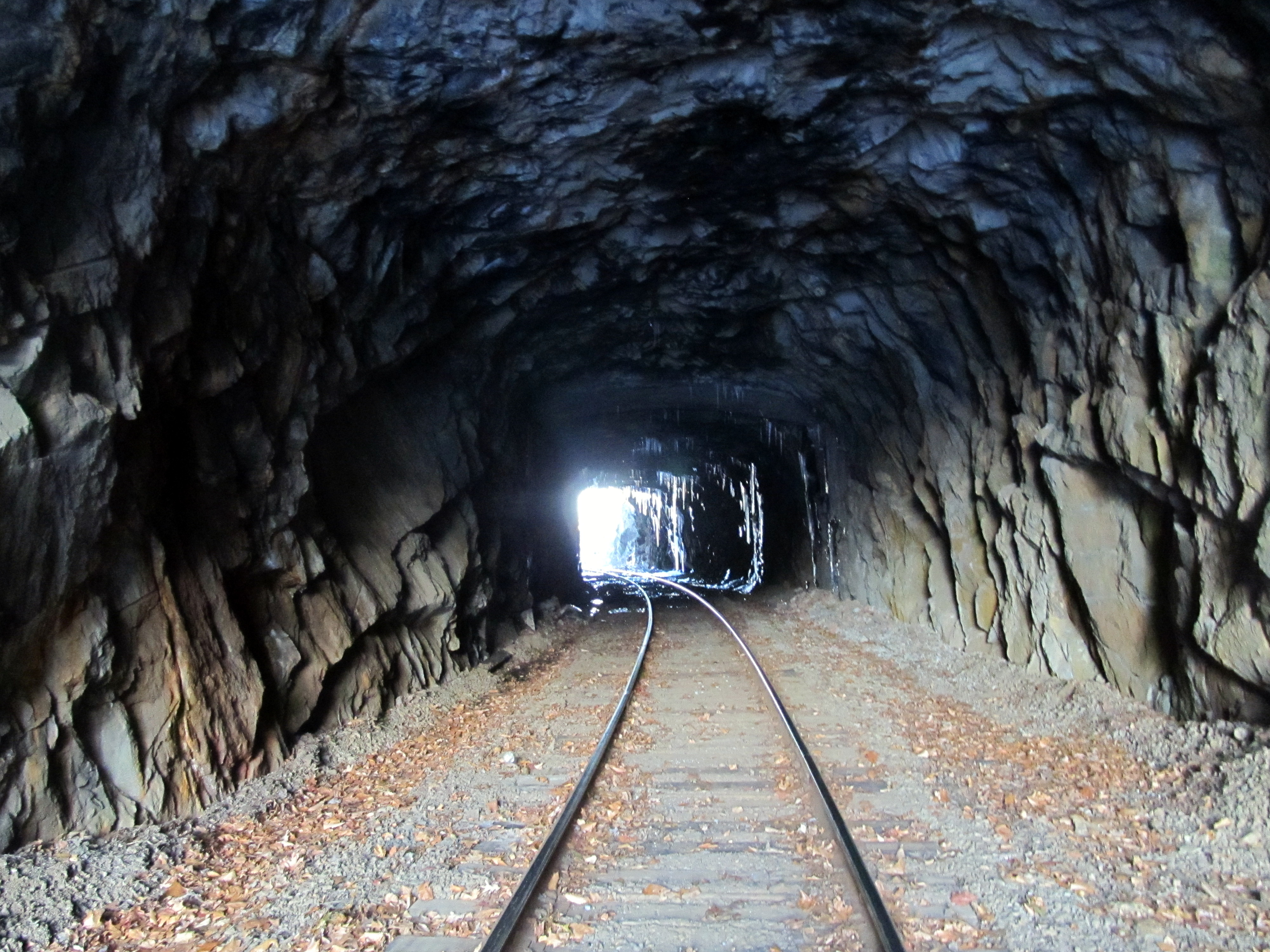
Interior of the tunnel in 2017

In late November 1835, the Norwich and Worcester Railroad awarded a contract for construction of the first 8 miles (13 km) of its line from Norwich, Connecticut, to Jewett City, Connecticut. The most difficult section of the railroad to construct, it ran along the rocky ledges of the Quinebaug River and required a short tunnel under Bundy Hill. The tunnel was 300 feet (90 m) long, 23 feet (7.0 m) wide, and 18 feet (5.5 m) high. It was ready for rails to be laid on August 26, 1837, and declared complete two days later. Some passenger and freight service began around September 1839, though the railroad did not officially open until March 9, 1840.

The Taft Tunnel is the oldest common carrier tunnel in the country to be completed, although the Staple Bend Tunnel of the non-common carrier Allegheny Portage Railroad was completed in 1833. However, it was not the first to open - the Yorkville Tunnel (opened October 27, 1837), Black Rock Tunnel (opened 1838), and Howard Tunnel (opened 1838) were all in service before the Taft Tunnel. Now used by the Providence and Worcester Railroad for freight service, the tunnel is still among the oldest active railroad tunnels in the United States.

== See also ==
- Oldest railroads in North America
