= Thomas Brigstocke =

British artist (1809–1881)

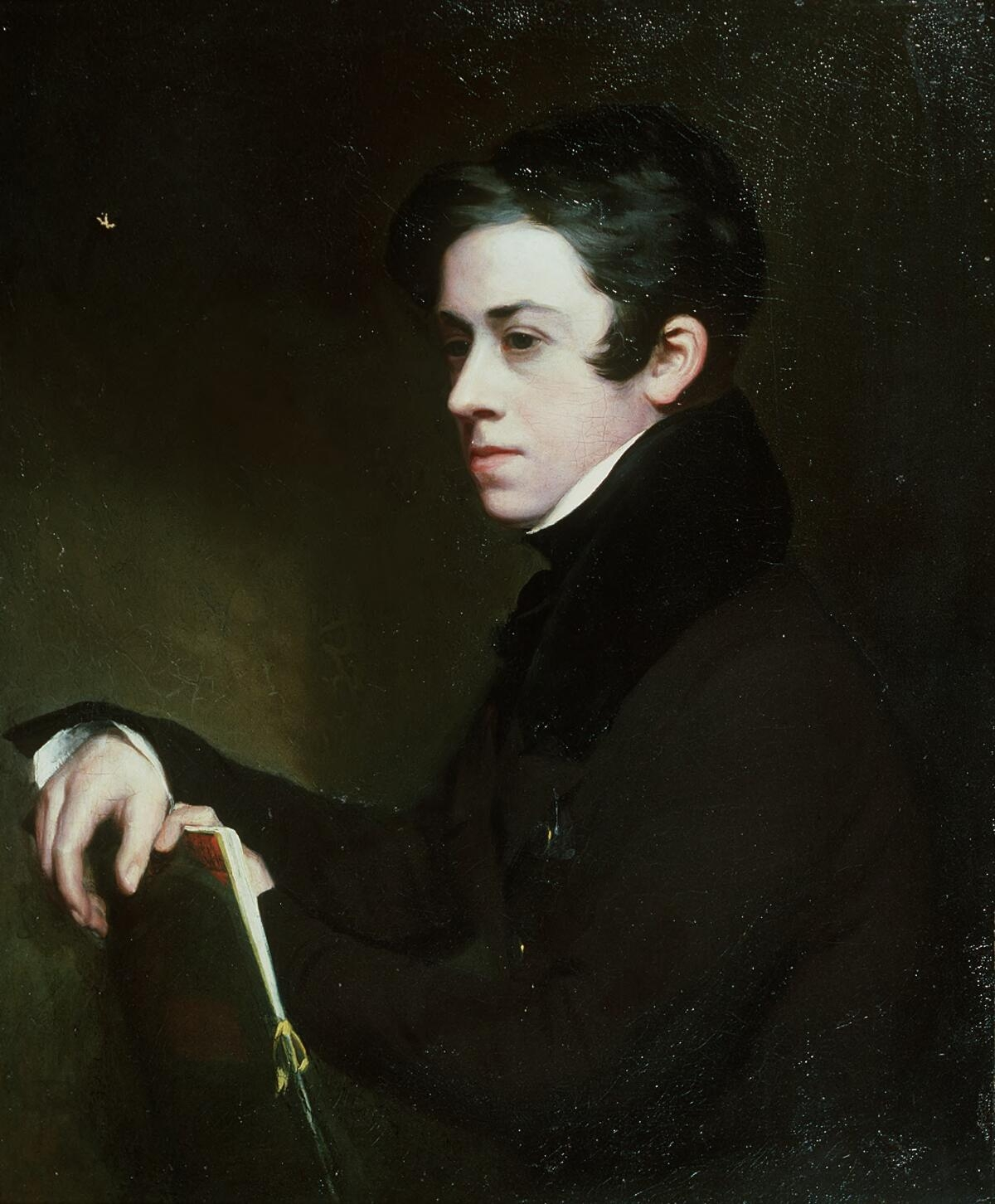
Self portrait (c. 1830)

Thomas Brigstocke (1809 – 11 March 1881) was a Welsh portrait painter. He studied art in London, and then spent eight years in Italy before returning to England. In the 1840s he visited Egypt, where he painted portraits of Mohammed Ali Pasha and his family.

== Life and work ==
Brigstocke was born at 61, King Street, Carmarthen, on 17 April 1809, the third son of David and Mary Brigstocke. He was educated at Queen Elizabeth's Grammar School in Carmarthen. At the age of sixteen he was sent by his parents to study in the studio of Henry Sass in Charlotte Street, London. Eight months later he became a student at the Royal Academy Schools, first under Henry Perronet Briggs, and then under John Prescott Knight. In 1833 he left Britain to study in Paris, Florence, Rome, and Naples, spending eight years in Italy. During this period he made various copies of the old masters, including one of Raphael's Transfiguration which was bought as an altarpiece for Christ Church, Albany Street, London, on the recommendation of the painter William Collins. During his time in Rome he associated with two other Welsh artists residents there, John Gibson and Penry Williams, as well as Englishmen such as E.M. Ward and Joseph Severn. Brigstocke, a Welsh-speaker, is said to have taught the noted linguist Cardinal Mezzofanti the language.

Brigstocke first exhibited at the Royal Academy Exhibition of 1842, showing a painting called Alnaschar, the Barber's Fifth Brother. Between then and 1865 he exhibited 16 works at the Academy and two at the British Institution. The Academy catalogues give London addresses throughout this time. The Oriental Club commissioned him to paint a portrait of General Sir William Nott, following his return from a campaign in Afghanistan, and in 1847 Brigstocke went to Egypt with a letter of introduction from the Oriental Club to Mohammed Ali Pasha, and painted portraits of him and his family. He spent sixteen months working in Egypt, mainly at the Palace of Shoubra, on the Nile, near Cairo, and at Ras el Tin, Alexandria.

In London he had a successful portrait practice, and also occasionally painted dogs. He was the author of a four-act historical drama entitled The Mutual Scourges, or France and her Neighbours (1871).

Brigstocke died suddenly on 11 March 1881, aged 72, and was buried at Kensal Green cemetery.

== Portrait subjects ==
His portraits subjects included:

- Captain Gotteaux, of the Madras Infantry, in the costume of a Sheik of the Lebanon (Royal Academy 1849).
- James Harmer, Esq., of Ingress Abbey, Kent (Royal Academy 1850).
- Sir Henry Holland, M.D. (National Portrait Gallery, London)
- John Jones M.P. (Carmarthen Guildhall)
- Jung Bahadoor, Prime Minister of Nepaul, painted when he was ambassador in England. (Royal Academy, 1858)
- Fanny Kemble (City Museum, Hereford ).
- Mohammed Ali (versions for the Palace of the Citadel, Cairo, the Palace of Ras el Tin, and the Oriental Club, London).
- David Morris (Carmarthen Guildhall).
- General Sir William Nott (versions for the Town Hall of Calcutta, Carmarthen Guildhall, and the Oriental Club, London).
- General Sir James Outram (versions in the Oriental Club, London and National Portrait Gallery).
- John Edmund Reade (Royal Academy 1850).
- Cardinal Wiseman, (Royal Academy 1851) in St. Cuthbert's, near Durham.
- Rev Dr. Wolff (Royal Academy 1856).
- William Bentley, Master of the Leathersellers' Company 1857-58, (Leathersellers' Hall, London; portrait destroyed by bombing in May 1941).

== Other paintings ==
His other paintings include the Moses with Arms supported by Aaron and Hur, in the collection of Aberystwyth University and A Dog of the Convent of Great St. Bernard, remarkable for his docility, courage and intelligence, and for his attachment to his master, on whose tomb he is represented (Royal Academy 1857).

== Sources ==
- This article incorporates text from a publication now in the public domain: Fagan, Louis Alexander (1886). "Brigstocke, Thomas". In Stephen, Leslie (ed.). Dictionary of National Biography. Vol. 6. London: Smith, Elder & Co. p. 342.
