= 29th (Worcestershire) Regiment of Foot =

Line infantry regiment of the English and British armies

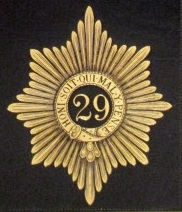
- The regimental cap badge
- Active: 1694–1698; 1702–1881
- Allegiance: England (1694–1707); Great Britain (1707–1801); United Kingdom (1801–1881)
- Branch: English Army (1694–1707); British Army (1707–1881)
- Type: Regiment
- Role: Line infantry
- Garrison/HQ: Norton Barracks, Worcestershire
- Nicknames: "The Two and Hook" "The Ever Sworded 29th" "The Vein Openers" "The Guards of the Line"
- Colours: Yellow Facings
- March: Royal Windsor, 1791
- Anniversaries: The Glorious First of June 1794
- Engagements: War of the Spanish Succession: Battle of Ramillies; Boston Massacre; Peninsular War: Battle of Albuera; First Anglo-Sikh War: Battle of Sobraon

Commanders
- Notable commanders: Thomas Gage (1719–1787); Willem Anne van Keppel, 2nd Earl of Albemarle (1731–1733); William Evelyn (1769–1783); William Tryon (1783–1788); Charles Stanhope, 3rd Earl of Harrington (1788–1792); William Cathcart, 1st Earl Cathcart (1792–1797); John Byng, 1st Earl of Strafford (1828–1850)

The 29th (Worcestershire) Regiment of Foot was a line infantry regiment of the English and British armies raised in 1694. Under the Childers Reforms it was amalgamated with the 36th (Herefordshire) Regiment of Foot to become the 1st Battalion of the Worcestershire Regiment in 1881.

== History ==
=== Formation in 1694 to end of the 18th Century ===
The regiment was formed on 16 February 1694 during the Nine Years War by Colonel Thomas Farrington as Thomas Farrington's Regiment of Foot. Disbanded after the 1697 Treaty of Ryswick, it was reformed in 1702 when the War of the Spanish Succession began; while intended for the West Indies, a notoriously unhealthy posting, Farrington's protests meant that instead it joined Marlborough's army in Flanders in 1704.

Too late for the Blenheim campaign, it fought at the Battle of Ramillies in May 1706 and the Siege of Ostend in June. Lord Mark Kerr became Colonel when Farringdon died in October 1712, but, with the war winding down, it became part of the Gibraltar garrison. It remained there for the next 30 years, including the Siege of Gibraltar during the 1727-1729 Anglo-Spanish War.

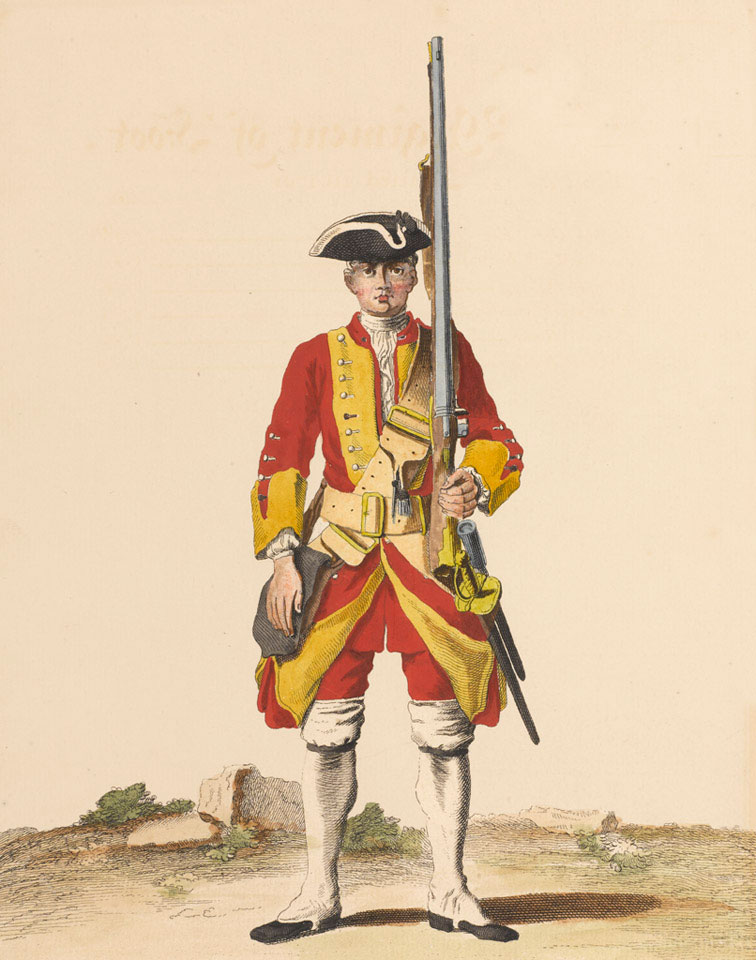
c. 1742 illustration of a regimental private

Regimental troops during Halifax, Nova Scotia's founding in 1749

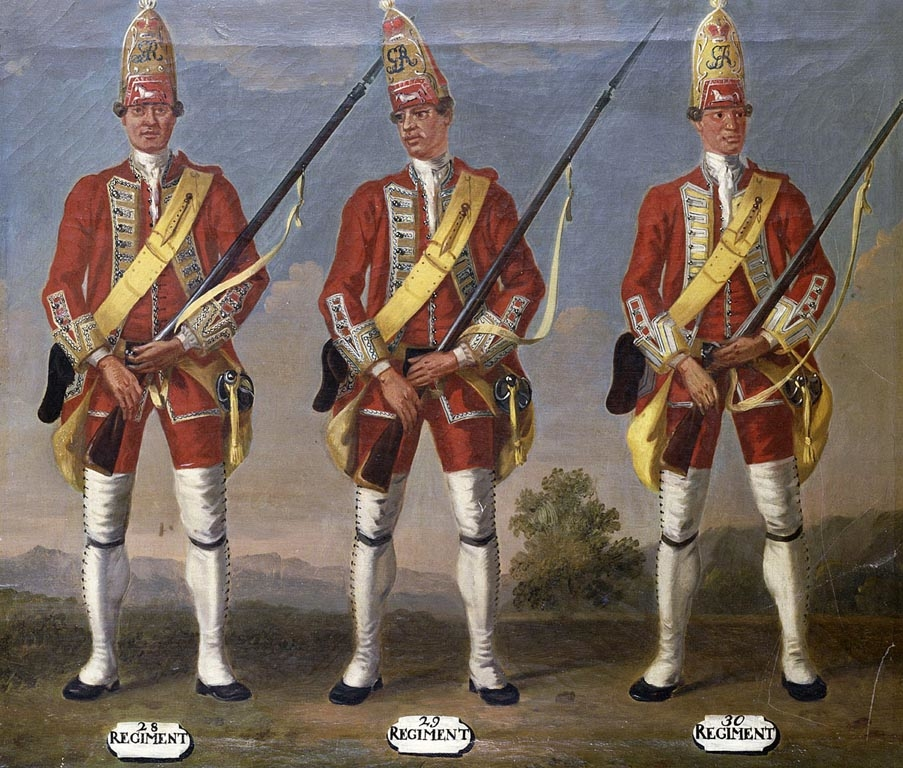
c. 1751 painting of a regimental grenadier (centre)

During the 1740-1748 War of the Austrian Succession, it was based in British North America and helped capture the French North American stronghold of Louisbourg in October 1745. In 1746, 27 soldiers died in the Port-la-Joye Massacre, in part because they were unarmed. In response, officers were ordered to carry swords and side arms even off duty, leading to the nickname, the Ever Sworded. The regiment remained in North America after the 1748 Treaty of Aix-la-Chapelle returned Louisbourg to France; in 1749, it helped establish the town of Halifax, Nova Scotia during Father Le Loutre's War.

A significant organisational change occurred in 1751; previously, regiments were considered the property of their Colonel, changed names when transferred from one to another and were disbanded as soon as possible. As part of a package of reforms driven by the increasing professionalisation of the military, each regiment was now assigned a number, based on precedence or seniority in the Army list; Colonel Peregrine Hopson's Regiment became the 29th Regiment of Foot.

George Boscawen replaced Hopson as Colonel in 1752 and his brother, Admiral Edward Boscawen presented him with 10 Black youths from Guadeloupe taken from Guadeloupe following the 1759 British invasion. They were employed as regimental drummers, a tradition that continued until 1843.

Together with the 14th Foot, the 29th was posted to Boston in 1768. On 5 March 1770, members of the Grenadier company under Captain Thomas Preston were involved in the Boston Massacre, when five colonists died during a riot in front of the Boston customs house. The 29th was later dubbed the Vein Openers, for allegedly drawing first blood in the American Revolution.

Those involved were tried for murder, defended by John Adams, a future President of the United States; two soldiers, Hugh Montgomery and Matthew Kilroy were found guilty of manslaughter and branded on the thumb. Preston and the others were found not guilty and following the trial, the regiment moved to British-controlled Florida in 1771, then to England in 1773.

During the American War of Independence in 1775, the Continental Army tried to capture Quebec City; they were forced to retreat but the 29th arrived in Quebec in June 1776 to reinforce British forces in what is now modern Canada. The Light and Grenadier companies were detached to join the 1777 Saratoga campaign, and fought at the Battle of Hubbardton on 7 July under Brigadier General Simon Fraser. Following defeat in the Battles of Saratoga, these companies surrendered with the rest of Burgoyne's force in October 1777. The other eight remained in Canada, fighting in a number of raids and small battles along the Vermont and New York state frontiers.

On 31 August 1782, the unit was renamed the 29th (Worcestershire) Regiment of Foot by a royal warrant giving county titles to all regiments that did not already have a special title. This was an attempt to improve recruitment, but no depot was established in the county and recruits were liable to serve in any regiment.

The regiment returned to England after the Anglo-French War ended in 1783; in 1791, it was given the regimental march known as 'The Royal Windsor,' allegedly composed by Princess Augusta, with the help of Lord William Cathcart.

The French Revolutionary Wars broke out in 1792 and in 1794, members of the 29th took part in the British naval victory known as the Glorious First of June, serving as marines on HMS Brunswick and Ramillies. The regiment was awarded a naval crown for its participation in the battle, during which the Brunswick sank the French ship Le Vengeur du Peuple and disabled the Achille. At the end of December 1794, a battalion of 21 officers and 640 men, formed from those in the 29th who were not detached to warships, embarked on the troopship Maria for the Caribbean island of Grenada, where discontent would lead to an insurrection in the coming months, known as Fédon's Rebellion or the Brigand's War. On their return to England in July 1796, the battalion had been reduced by battle casualties and disease to 5 officers and 87 men. It later fought in a more conventional role at Alkmaar in October 1799, during the Anglo-Russian invasion of Holland.

=== 19th century ===
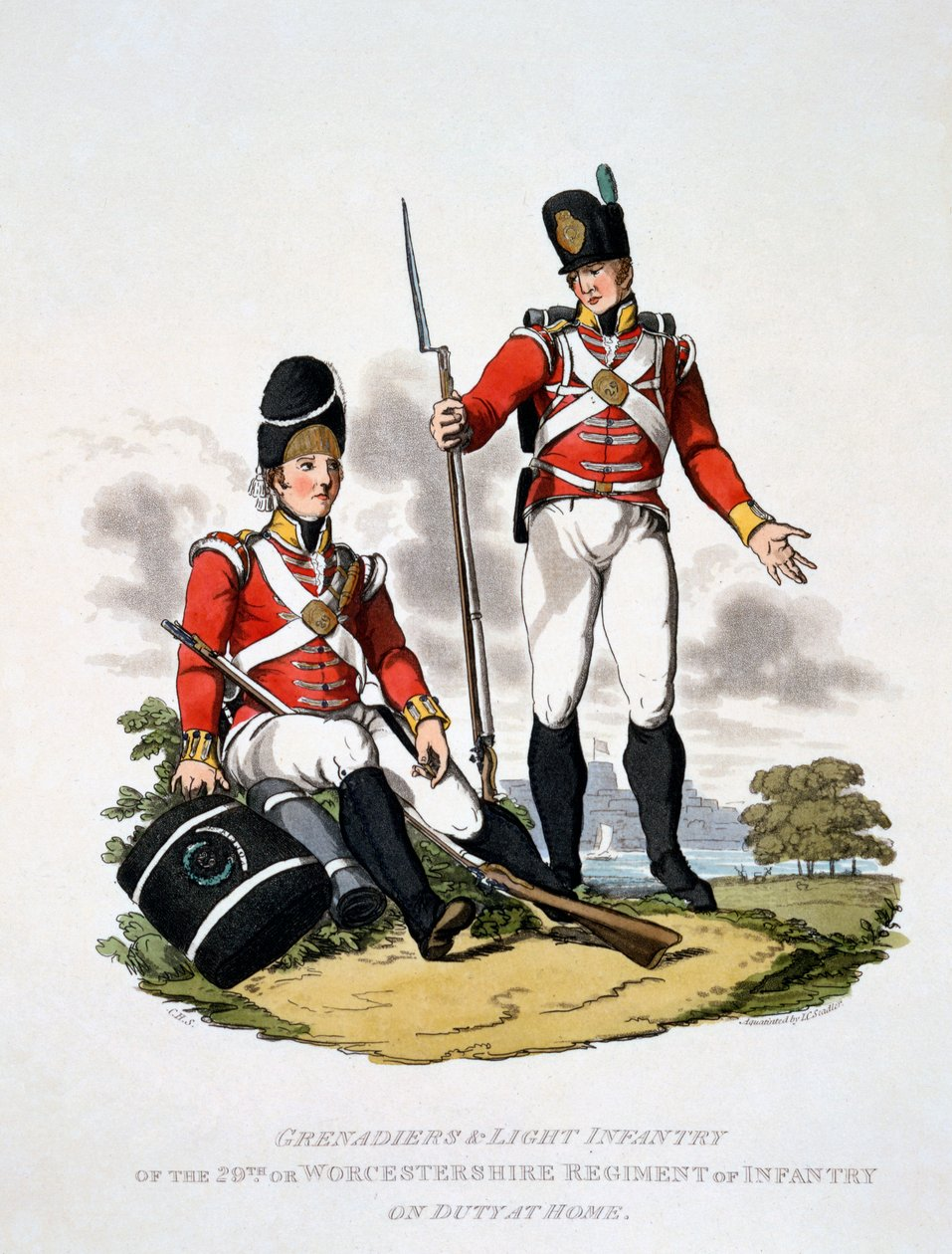
1813 engraving of a regimental grenadier and light infantryman

In 1808, the 29th joined Wellington's army engaged in the 1807-1814 Peninsular War in Spain and Portugal. At Roliça on 17 August, it suffered heavy losses assaulting an entrenched French position, which was taken only after a prolonged defence; at Vimeiro four days later, it held off an attack by Brenier's Brigade, allowing two other British battalions to first regroup, then repulse the attack. The 29th Foot at Vimeiro were the last British Army regiment to go into battle wearing their hair pulled back into queues.

I wish very much that some measures could be adopted to get recruits for the regiment, it is the best Regiment in this Army, has an admirable internal system and excellent Non-Commissioned Officers.

— Sir Arthur Wellesley 12 September 1809

After the Battle of Grijó in May, it was engaged at Talavera in July; on 27th, with two other battalions, it attacked French positions on the hill called Cerro de Medellin. This was taken by the evening and then held throughout the next day, despite a series of French attacks and artillery bombardment; two French colours were captured in a bayonet charge that drove the French regiments from the field. At the Battle of Albuera on 16 May 1811, it suffered heavy losses, including Ensigns Edward Furnace and Richard Vance killed saving the regimental colours. After this, it returned to England to refit and recruit more men.

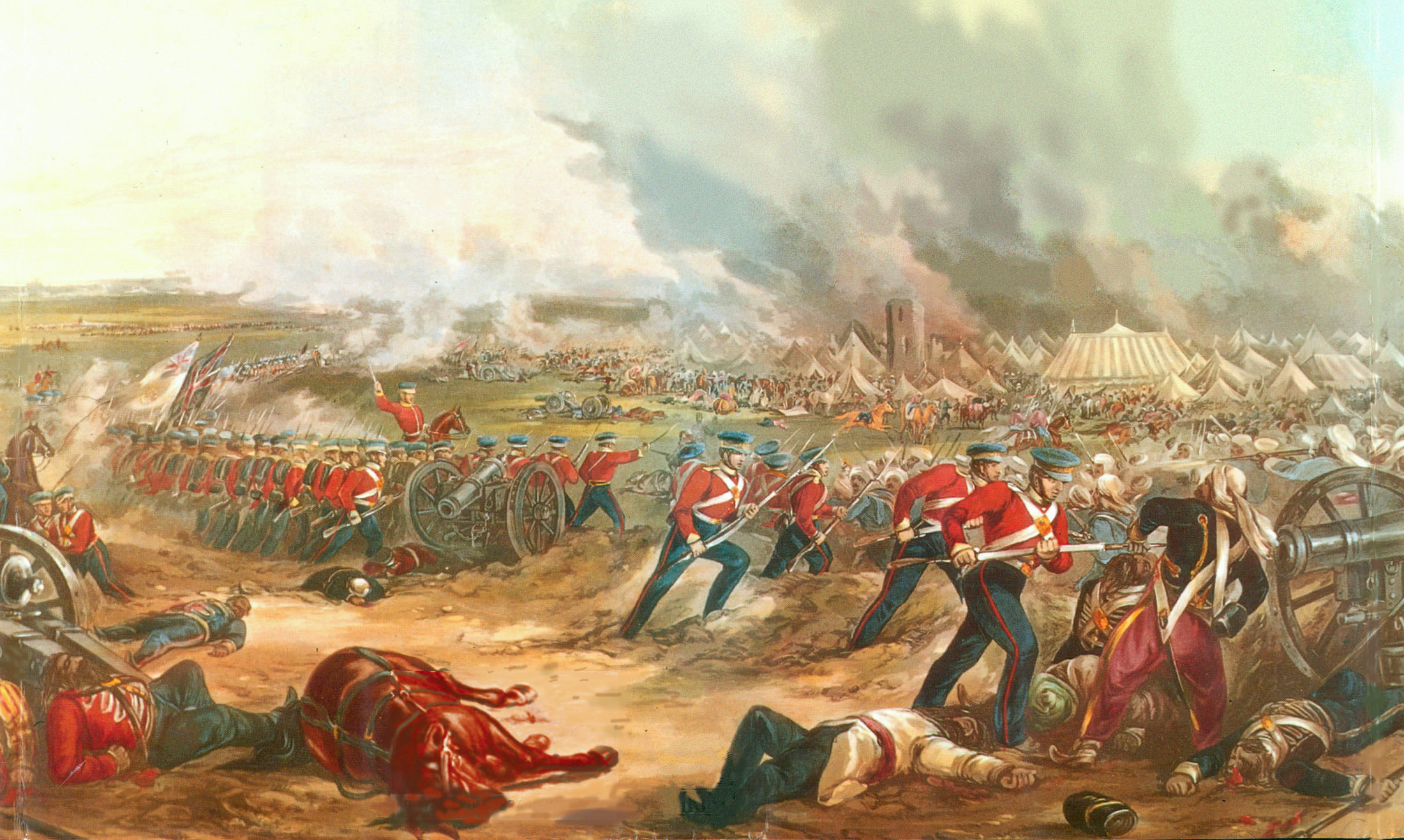
The Battle of Ferozeshah, which the regiment fought in

In 1814, the 29th returned to Nova Scotia during the War of 1812, fighting at the Battle of Hampden. It was recalled to Europe in 1815 to face Napoleon during the Hundred Days campaign but arrived shortly after the Battle of Waterloo. Transferred to Bengal in 1842, during the First Anglo-Sikh War the regiment fought at the Battle of Ferozeshah in December 1845 and the Battle of Sobraon on 10 February 1846. At Sobraon, the 29th, along with two battalions of Indian Sepoys twice unsuccessfully assaulted the Sikh earthworks before finally breaking through on the third assault: the regiment's commanding officer, Lieutenant Colonel Charles Taylor was killed in the assault. The regiment fought at the Battle of Chillianwala in January 1849 and the Battle of Gujrat in February 1849 during the Second Anglo-Sikh War. A large detachment from the regiment helped to keep the Grand Trunk Road open between Kabul and Bangladesh during the Indian Rebellion.

=== Amalgamations ===
In 1873 a practical system of recruiting areas based on counties was instituted. The 29th Sub-District, consisting of the counties of Herefordshire and Worcestershire was created, with headquarters at Norton Barracks, three miles from the city of Worcester. The barracks became the depot for the regiment along with the 36th (Herefordshire) Regiment of Foot and the militia of the two counties. On 1 July 1881 the Childers Reforms came into effect and the regiment became the 1st Battalion, the Worcestershire Regiment, while the 36th became the 2nd battalion.

== Garter Star badge ==
The regimental badge of the regiment and later of the Worcestershire Regiment show the influence of the Coldstream Guards on the regiment. The Coldstream Guards and the 29th are the only two regiments to have the elongated star and garter of the Order of the Garter as their regimental badge with its motto "Honi Soit Qui Mal Y Pense" translated "Shame be to him who evil thinks" earning a third nickname The Guards of the Line.

== Battle honours ==
Battle honours won by the regiment were:

- Peninsula War: Roliça, Vimeiro, Talavera, Albuhera, Peninsula
- First Anglo-Sikh War: Ferozeshah, Sobraon
- Second Anglo-Sikh War: Chillianwala, Goojerat, Punjab
- Ramillies (awarded to successor regiment, 1882)
- Ushant (awarded to successor regiment, 1909)

== Regimental Colonels ==
Colonels of the Regiment were:

- 1694–1698: Lt-Gen. Thomas Farrington
- regiment disbanded 1698
- regiment reformed 1702
- 1702–1712: Lt-Gen. Thomas Farrington
- 1712–1725: Gen. Lord Mark Kerr
- 1725–1731: Col. Henry Disney
- 1731–1733: Gen. William Anne Keppel, 2nd Earl of Albemarle, KG, KB
- 1733–1739: Lt-Gen. George Reade
- 1739–1748: Maj-Gen. Francis Fuller
- 1748–1752: Maj-Gen. Peregrine Thomas Hopson

29th Regiment of Foot - (1751)

- 1752–1761: Lt-Gen. Hon. George Boscawen
- 1761–1769: Lt-Gen. George Forbes, 4th Earl of Granard (Viscount Forbes)
- 1769–1783: Lt-Gen. William Evelyn

29th (Worcestershire) Regiment of Foot

- 1783–1788: Lt-Gen. William Tryon
- 1788–1792: Gen. Charles Stanhope, 3rd Earl of Harrington, GCH
- 1792–1797: Gen. William Cathcart, 1st Earl Cathcart, KT
- 1797–1828: Gen. Gordon Forbes
- 1828–1850: F.M. Sir John Byng, 1st Earl of Strafford, GCB, GCH
- 1850–1863: Gen. Sir Ulysses Burgh, 2nd Baron Downes, GCB
- 1863–1868: Gen. Sir James Simpson, GCB
- 1868–1881: Gen. John Longfield, CB

== See also ==
- List of Regiments of Foot
- List of British Army regiments (1881)
- History of the British Army

== Sources ==
- A Short Narrative of the Horrid Massacre. London: W. Bingley. 1770. OCLC 510892519.
- Everard, Hugh (1891). History of Thomas Farrington's Regiment: Subsequently designated the 29th (Worcestershire) Foot 1694–1881. Littlebury and Company.
- Gardiner, Robert (2001) [1996]. Fleet Battle and Blockade: The French Revolutionary War, 1793–1797. London: Chatham. ISBN 1-86176-018-3.
- Swanson, Arthur (1972). A Register of the Regiments and Corps of the British Army. London: The Archive Press. p. xxxvi. ISBN 0-85591-000-3.
- Zobel, Hiller B (1970). The Boston Massacre. New York: W.W. Norton & Company. ISBN 978-0-393-31483-0.
