= Lisbon, Connecticut =

- Town
- Town of Lisbon
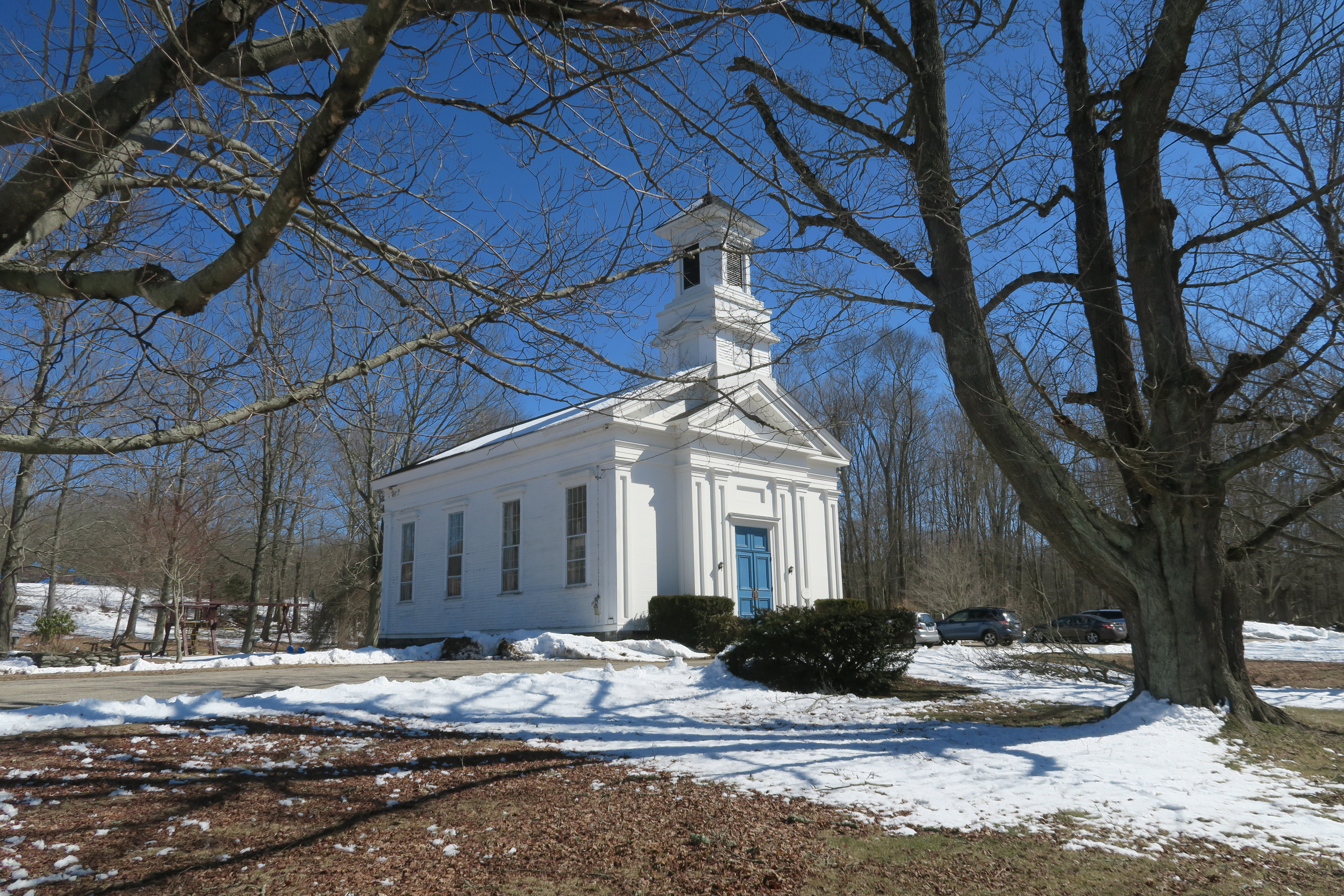
- Newent Congregational Church

- Seal
- Interactive map of Lisbon, Connecticut
- Coordinates: 41°36′14″N 72°00′42″W
- Country: United States
- U.S. state: Connecticut
- County: New London
- Region: Southeastern CT
- Incorporated: 1786

Government
  - Type: Selectman-town meeting
  - First selectman: Thomas W. Sparkman (R)
  - Selectman: Robert T. Browne, Sr. (R)
  - Selectman: William C. Surfus (D)

Area
  - Total: 16.6 sq mi (43.0 km^{2})
  - Land: 16.3 sq mi (42.1 km^{2})
  - Water: 0.39 sq mi (1.0 km^{2})
- Elevation: 330 ft (100 m)

Population (2020)
  - Total: 4,195
  - Density: 258/sq mi (99.6/km^{2})
- Time zone: UTC-5 (Eastern)
  - Summer (DST): UTC-4 (Eastern)
- ZIP Code: 06351
- Area codes: 860/959
- FIPS code: 09-43230
- GNIS feature ID: 0213451
- Website: www.lisbonct.gov

Lisbon is a town in New London County, Connecticut, United States, 7.3 miles (11.7 km) by road northeast of Norwich. The town is part of the Southeastern Connecticut Planning Region. The population was 4,195 at the 2020 census. The town center is also known as the village of Newent. The town school is Lisbon Central School. Its only postal code, 06351, is Jewett City, Connecticut, which is a village of the town of Griswold, Connecticut and encompasses all of Lisbon and Griswold.

== History ==
The town incorporated from Norwich in 1786. The community was named after Lisbon, the capital of Portugal.

== Geography ==
According to the United States Census Bureau, the town has a total area of 16.6 square miles (43 km^{2}), of which 16.3 square miles (42 km^{2}) is land and 0.4 square miles (1.0 km^{2}), or 2.29%, is water.

The Taft Tunnel carries the Providence and Worcester Railroad through the hills along the Quinebaug River.

== Demographics ==
Historical population
Census	Pop.	Note	%±
1820	1,159		—
1850	938		—
1860	1,262		34.5%
1870	502		−60.2%
1880	630		25.5%
1890	548		−13.0%
1900	697		27.2%
1910	824		18.2%
1920	867		5.2%
1930	1,097		26.5%
1940	1,131		3.1%
1950	1,282		13.4%
1960	2,019		57.5%
1970	2,808		39.1%
1980	3,279		16.8%
1990	3,790		15.6%
2000	4,069		7.4%
2010	4,338		6.6%
2020	4,195		−3.3%
U.S. Decennial Census

As of the census of 2000, there were 4,069 people, 1,525 households, and 1,181 families living in the town. The population density was 250.3 inhabitants per square mile (96.6/km^{2}). There were 1,563 housing units at an average density of 96.1 per square mile (37.1/km^{2}). The racial makeup of the town was 96.71% White, 0.32% African American, 0.42% Native American, 0.47% Asian, 0.37% from other races, and 1.72% from two or more races. Hispanic or Latino people of any race were 0.57% of the population.

There were 1,525 households, out of which 36.9% had children under the age of 18 living with them, 63.9% were married couples living together, 8.9% had a female householder with no husband present, and 22.5% were non-families. 18.6% of all households were made up of individuals, and 8.0% had someone living alone who was 65 years of age or older. The average household size was 2.67 and the average family size was 3.03.

In the town, the population was spread out, with 26.0% under the age of 18, 6.1% from 18 to 24, 30.4% from 25 to 44, 26.0% from 45 to 64, and 11.4% who were 65 years of age or older. The median age was 39 years. For every 100 females, there were 98.7 males. For every 100 females age 18 and over, there were 94.7 males.

The median income for a household in the town was $55,149, and the median income for a family was $61,888. Males had a median income of $40,043 versus $25,833 for females. The per capita income for the town was $22,476. About 1.8% of families and 3.2% of the population were below the poverty line, including 2.4% of those under age 18 and 3.4% of those age 65 or over.

Voter registration and party enrollment as of October 17, 2025
Party	Active voters	Inactive voters	Total voters	Percentage
Republican	875	19	894	27.99%
Democratic	803	20	823	25.77%
Unaffiliated	1,390	37	1,427	44.68%
Minor Parties	50	0	50	1.57%
Total	3,118	76	3,194	100%

== Notable locations ==
=== Listed on the National Register of Historic Places ===
- Andrew Clark House – built in 1740, it was added to the National Register of Historic Places in 1979.
- Anshei Israel Synagogue – built in 1936, a rare example of a rural synagogue.
- Lathrop-Mathewson-Ross House – built in 1761, it was added to the National Register of Historic Places in 1982.
- John Palmer House
- Taft Tunnel – Built in 1837, Taft Tunnel is the oldest railroad tunnel in America and continues to serve a line of the Providence and Worcester Railroad.

== Notable people ==
- Elias Perkins (1767–1845), congressman
- John D. Read (1814–1864), abolitionist
