= Sir Compton Reade, 1st Baronet =

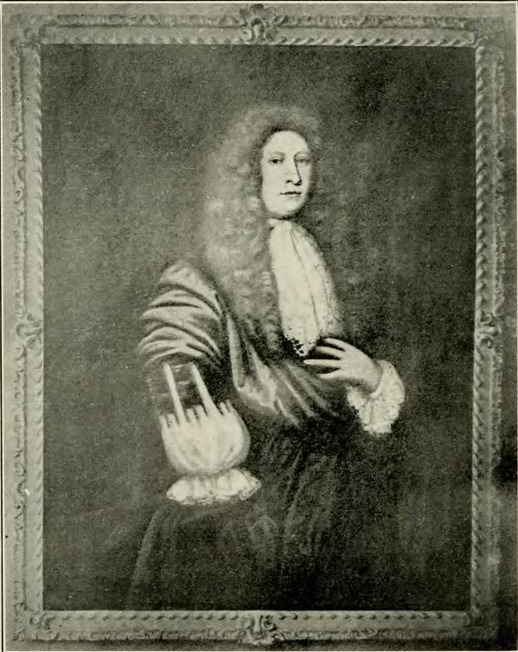
Sir Compton Reade, 1st Baronet by Mary Beale

Sir Compton Reade, 1st Baronet (1627 – 29 September 1679) was an English landowner and Royalist.

== Biography ==
Reade was the son of Thomas Reade of Appleton, Oxfordshire and Mary, née Cornwall (daughter of Sir Thomas Cornwall of Burford). He was the nephew of Sir John Reade, 1st Baronet. Reade was educated at Magdalen College, Oxford, matriculating on 1 July 1642.

He was a staunch Royalist during the English Civil War, with his home, Barton Court in Abingdon-on-Thames, being used as a Royalist garrison owing to its proximity to the king's wartime capital at Oxford. Charles I and Henrietta Maria of France stayed with Reade at Barton Court several times. In April 1644, the royal couple had their final parting at the house before the Queen fled to France. As the first civil war drew to a close, Reade attempted to defend his house from attack but in March 1646 Parliamentarian forces burned Barton Court to the ground. Tradition holds that Reade refused to surrender and the house was "burnt over his head".

Reade lived quietly under the Commonwealth of England, but his fortunes were restored upon the Stuart Restoration in 1660. Reade was among those identified to be Knights of the Royal Oak, with an estate of £2,000. On 4 March 1661, he was created a baronet, of Barton in the Baronetage of England in recognition of his loyalty to the Royalist cause. On 17 November 1663 he purchased the manor at Shipton-under-Wychwood to become the new family seat. The same year, he served as High Sheriff of Berkshire. In 1677 he was appointed to serve as High Sheriff of Buckinghamshire.

In 1650, Reade married his first cousin, Mary Cornwall, daughter of Sir Gilbert Cornwall of Burford, at Duns Tew. Together they had five children. Upon Reade's death in 1679, he was succeeded in his title and estates by his second (but eldest surviving) son, Edward.

Honorary titles
Preceded by Thomas Berringer	High Sheriff of Buckinghamshire; 1677	Succeeded by Thomas Edgerley
Preceded by George Purefoy	High Sheriff of Berkshire; 1663	Succeeded by Sir William Backhouse, Bt
Baronetage of England
New creation	Baronet (of Barton); 1661–1679	Succeeded by Edward Reade
