= John Edmund Reade =

English poet and novelist

John Edmund Reade (1800–1870) was an English poet and novelist.

== Life ==
Reade was born in 1800 at Broadwell, near Stow-on-the-Wold in Gloucestershire, the son of Thomas Reade of Barton Manor, Berkshire, and his wife Catherine, daughter of Sir John Hill. His grandfather, Sir John Reade, was fourth baronet, being the great-grandson of Compton Reade of Shipton Court, Oxfordshire.

Extract from 'Lines Written upon Doulting Sheep-Slate'

I felt I stood on sacred ground that hallowed was to me,
To boyhood's years far faded on the verge of memory:
Sacred to me the grey-haired man who drank God's blessed air,
Though thirty years had rolled away since last I entered there!

The oak drooped o'er that gate, a withered thing in dead repose.
Grey Doulting's spire above the waste a sheeted spectre rose;
And Mendip's bleak and barren heights again enclosed me round,
Like faces of forgotten friends met on forgotten ground.

Reade was educated at a school at Doulting, near Shepton Mallet. His first work, a collection of poems entitled The Broken Heart, was published in 1825. He was to devote the rest of his life to literature, although he was severely criticised for lack of originality: Edward Irving Carlyle, in the first edition of the Dictionary of National Biography, says he "developed a remarkable capacity for plagiarism", adding that "Byron served for his chief model, but his poems and plays are full of sentiments and phrases taken undisguisedly from the best-known writings of Scott, Wordsworth, Ben Jonson, Croly, and others." His "Cain, the Wanderer" (1830), however, earned him an introduction to Coleridge and was praised by Goethe. In 1838, after a long stay in the southern Europe, he published his longest poem, Italy, which, according to Carlyle, "bears a close resemblance to Childe Harold, reproducing even the dying gladiator".

His other publications included Sibyl Leaves: Poems (1827); The Revolt of the Angels, an epic drama (1830); Catiline, a tragedy (1839); Prose from the South (1846); and the novels The Light of other Days (1858), Wait and Hope (1859) and Saturday Sterne (1862). Several collected editions of his poems were published, the most complete being that of 1865, in three volumes.

Reade lived in Bath and the west of England for most of his life, but also spent considerable periods in central and southern Europe. He died on 17 September 1870.

A portrait of Reade by Thomas Brigstocke was exhibited at the Royal Academy in 1850.

== Sources ==
Attribution

- Carlyle, Edward Irving (1896). "Reade, John Edmund". In Lee, Sidney (ed.). Dictionary of National Biography. Vol. 47. London: Smith, Elder & Co.
