= Anshei Israel Synagogue =

Historic former Orthodox synagogue in Lisbon, Connecticut

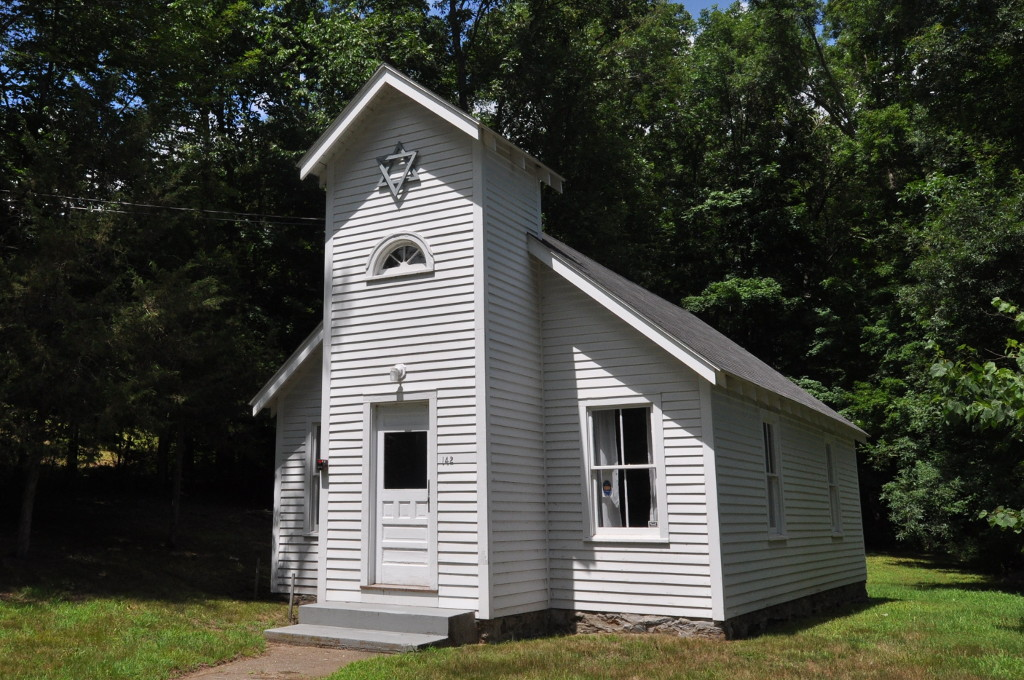
- The former Anshei Israel Synagogue

- Location of the former synagogue in Connecticut

Religion
- Affiliation: Orthodox Judaism (former)
- Ecclesiastical or organizational status: Synagogue (1936–c. 1980s)
- Ownership: Town of Lisbon
- Status: Closed (as a synagogue)

Location
- Location: 142 Newent Road, (CT 138), Lisbon, Connecticut
- Country: United States
- Interactive map of Anshei Israel Synagogue
- Coordinates: 41°36′17″N 72°00′02″W

Architecture
- Type: Synagogue
- Style: Colonial Revival
- General contractor: George Allen & Sons
- Established: unknown (as a congregation)
- Completed: 1936

Specifications
- Interior area: 20 by 30 feet (6.1 by 9.1 m)
- Height (max): 9 feet (2.7 m)
- Materials: Clapboard
- Anshei Israel Synagogue
- U.S. National Register of Historic Places
- Area: less than one acre
- MPS: Historic Synagogues of Connecticut MPS
- NRHP reference No.: 95000861
- Added to NRHP: July 21, 1995

Anshei Israel Synagogue is a historic former Orthodox Jewish synagogue building located at 142 Newent Road (CT 138) in Lisbon, Connecticut. It was added to the National Register of Historic Places in 1995 as part of a multiple property listing of 15 historic synagogues in Connecticut.

The Orthodox congregation was founded with 15 families who constructed the building in 1936. It was built by George Allen & Sons. The interior is a single room that is lined with five benches before the sacred ark. The congregation's membership dwindled throughout the 1940s and 1950s, finally limiting the services to holidays before finally closing in the early 1980s. The Town of Lisbon took ownership of the property in the 1980s, and it is currently maintained by the Lisbon Historical Society.

== Construction ==
Harry Rothenberg donated the land for the synagogue around 1936. The congregation pooled their money, and George Allen & Sons built the structure in 1836. The Anshei Israel Synagogue is a 20 by 30 feet (6.1 by 9.1 m) gable-roofed clapboarded building with a 5 feet (1.5 m) by 9 feet (2.7 m) central projecting tower which features a Magen David at its top. Flanking the tower on each side is a pair of two-over-two windows. Paint remnants show that the sash was previously painted a bright blue.

The single interior room has a raised bimah and ark at the front, both of which are original. The interior of the ark is concealed by a gold parochet, and a menorah rests on the podium. Chairs and five wooden benches are provided for seating, which has been described as "an unusual arrangement in historic Connecticut synagogues". The building had electricity but no heat or plumbing. A wood stove was used for heat, and an outhouse was previously behind the synagogue.

== Use ==
The founding congregation of 15 families came from Poland and Russia and lived in the surrounding towns of Plainfield, Lisbon, Griswold, and Jewett City. Rothenberg became the first cantor of the Anshei Israel Synagogue, and it served the Orthodox congregation for decades. The congregation's membership dwindled throughout the 1940s and 1950s, which limited services to holidays. The synagogue finally closed in 1987 when it could no longer steadily gather a minyin (ten men). The town of Lisbon acquired the property in the 1980s from the synagogue's last six members. In 2004, the building was open during "Walking Weekend" events.

The structure is well-preserved, but not currently in use. An article in the New London Day noted that some rules were not as strictly enforced in this synagogue as they were in the "Old World". Members of an Orthodox congregation were expected to walk to the synagogue, but some distant members of Anshei Israel Synagogue would drive and "walk the last mile or so." The synagogue did not use curtains to separate men and women, as was the norm for Orthodox services in Poland and Russia. The women's seating was at a table on the right side of the sanctuary, near the door.

== Importance ==
The Anshei Israel Synagogue was one of 15 Connecticut synagogues added to the National Register of Historic Places in 1995. It is recognized as an architecturally significant example of "a small country Jewish house of worship". Its architecture is the "epitome of simplicity", and it remains an important pre-1945 Jewish house of worship that is in a rural setting and possessing integrity in its design. The New London Day suggested that the synagogue may be the "only one of its kind in the country". In 2001, the building was featured on Connecticut Journal, a program of Connecticut Public Television.

In 2005, the building was in need of some repairs due to neglect and damage from squirrels. The Lisbon Historical Society received a $5,000 grant from the Quinebaug Shetucket National Heritage Corridor to make repairs. The electrical wiring was replaced for free by the students at the Norwich Regional Vocational Technical School.

== See also ==
- National Register of Historic Places listings in New London County, Connecticut
