= Francis Fuller (British Army officer) =

British Army officer (died 1748)

Major-General Francis Fuller (died 10 June 1748) was an officer of the British Army.

He was the elder son of Edward Fuller, a descendant of the Fullers of Uckfield in Sussex. On 19 July 1711 he was appointed lieutenant (ranking as a captain in the Army) in the 1st Regiment of Foot Guards. He was promoted to captain and lieutenant-colonel on 11 June 1715, second major of the regiment on 5 June 1733, first major on 5 July 1735, and lieutenant-colonel of the regiment on 15 December 1738.

On 28 August 1739 Fuller was appointed colonel of the former George Reade's Regiment of Foot. He was promoted to brigadier-general on 18 February 1742 and major-general on 12 July 1743, and was involved in the Battle at Port-la-Joye. He died while serving with his regiment at Cape Breton.

Military offices
Preceded by George Reade	Colonel of the Fuller's Regiment of Foot; 1739–1748	Succeeded by Hon. Peregrine Thomas Hopson
