= William McGavin =

Scottish businessman and religious controversialist (1773–1832)

William McGavin or M'Gavin (1773–1832) was a Scottish businessman and religious controversialist.

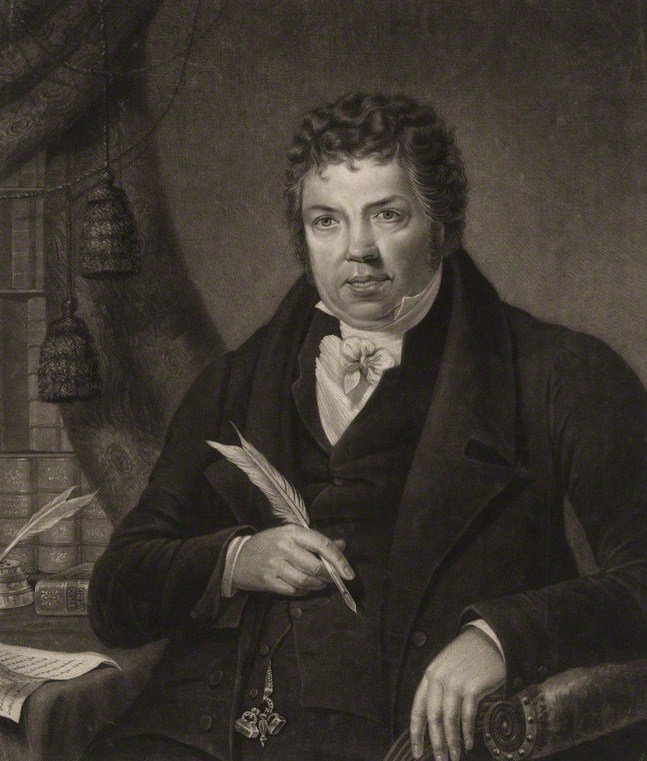
William McGavin, 1824 engraving

== Life ==
Born on 25 August 1773 at Darnlaw, in the parish of Auchinleck, Ayrshire, he was third son of James M'Gavin, farmer, by Mary M'Millan, a farmer's daughter of Muir-Kirk, in the same shire; the farm of Darnlaw belonged to James Boswell. In 1783 his father moved to Paisley. Almost entirely self-educated, McGavin in 1785 was bound apprentice to a weaver, but in 1790 he entered the service of John Neilson, then a Paisley printer and bookseller. During the three years that he remained there he studied English grammar and composition.

In 1793 McGavin went to assist his elder brother in running a school, of which he was soon given sole charge. About 1796 he set up a small thread business at Paisley, but was unsuccessful. In January 1799 he was engaged as bookkeeper to David Lamb, an American cotton merchant in Glasgow; to whose two sons he also acted as tutor. In 1803, on Lamb's return to America, the management of the business came into his hands, and on Lamb's death he entered in 1813 into partnership with his son.

McGavin belonged to the Antiburgher Church communion, and was a member of the congregation of James Ramsay, whom he joined about 1800, and subsequently assisted to form an independent church, occasionally preaching for him. In April 1804 he was regularly ordained Ramsay's co-pastor. He withdrew from the pastorate in 1807. He then joined the congregation of Greville Ewing. He also became an itinerant preacher and a director of religious societies at Glasgow.

His own business proving unprofitable, McGavin took on in 1822 the Glasgow agency of the British Linen Bank. He died on 23 August 1832. Monuments to his memory were erected in the Glasgow Necropolis, and at Auchinleck.

== Works ==
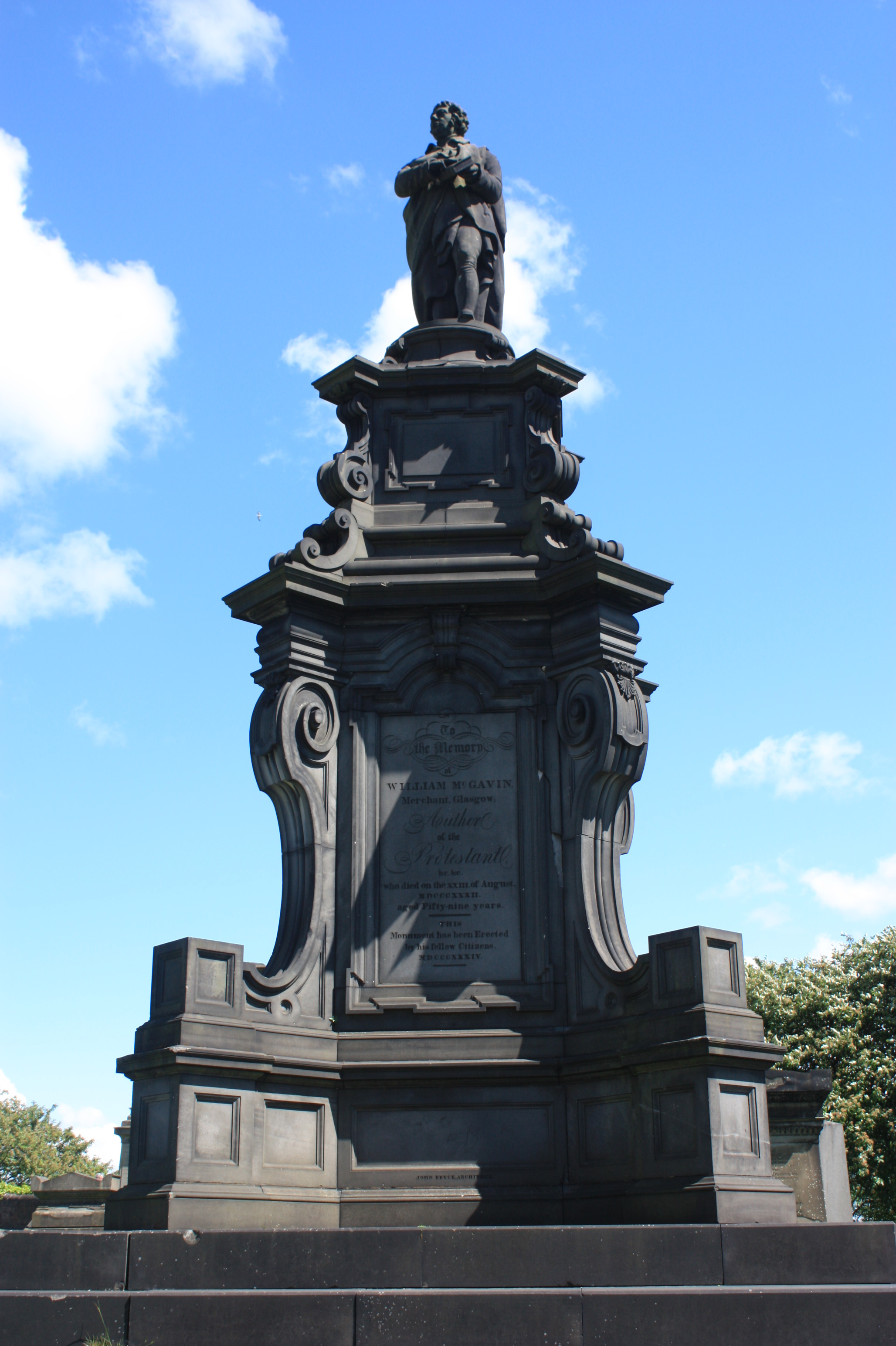
The huge monument on the grave of William McGavin, Glasgow Necropolis

McGavin from 1818 to 1822 he contributed to the Glasgow Chronicle a series of letters on major points of controversy between the Roman and Reformed churches under the general title of "The Protestant". William Eusebius Andrews countered by starting a weekly paper, The Catholic Vindicator, in reply to "The Protestant", but gave it up after a year. In book form The Protestant filled four volumes, and passed through six editions. Statements contained in it relative to the building of a Roman Catholic chapel in Glasgow led to an action for libel on behalf of the officiating priest in April 1821, and damages were awarded against McGavin. A public subscription to raise it produced a surplus.

McGavin wrote also in the Glasgow Chronicle against the principles of Robert Owen (1823), and of the views set out by William Cobbett in his History of the Protestant Reformation (1825); both series of letters were then published separately. He took part in the Apocrypha controversy of 1825. In 1826 he published an edition of John Knox's History of the Reformation, and subsequently defended the views expressed then in the Christian Herald (1827-9), under the title of Church Establishments considered, in a Series of Letters to a Covenanter (reissued as a book). He superintended an edition of John Howie's Biographia Scoticana in 1827 (other editions, 1833–4, 1846, 1858), and wrote an introductory essay to John Brown of Whitburn's Memorials of the Nonconformist Ministers of the Seventeenth Century (1832), besides tracts and books for the young. His posthumous works, with a memoir, were issued in two volumes in 1834.

== Family ==
On 7 October 1805 McGavin married Isabella Campbell of Paisley. His sister Jean was the mother of John Reid (1808–1841?), the compiler of Bibliotheca Scoto-Celtica, who supplied the memoir in McGavin's Posthumous Works.

== Notes ==
Attribution

This article incorporates text from a publication now in the public domain: Lee, Sidney, ed. (1893). "M'Gavin, William". Dictionary of National Biography. Vol. 35. London: Smith, Elder & Co.
