= Jack Reid =

Jack Reid may refer to:

- Jack Reid (artist) (died 2009), Canadian artist
- Jack Reid (footballer), Irish footballer
- Jack Reid (politician) (1942–2022), American politician

== See also ==
- John Reid (disambiguation)
- Jack Reed (disambiguation)
- Reid Jack, Scottish amateur golfer
