= Lathrop-Mathewson-Ross House =

Historic house in Connecticut, United States

- U.S. National Register of Historic Places
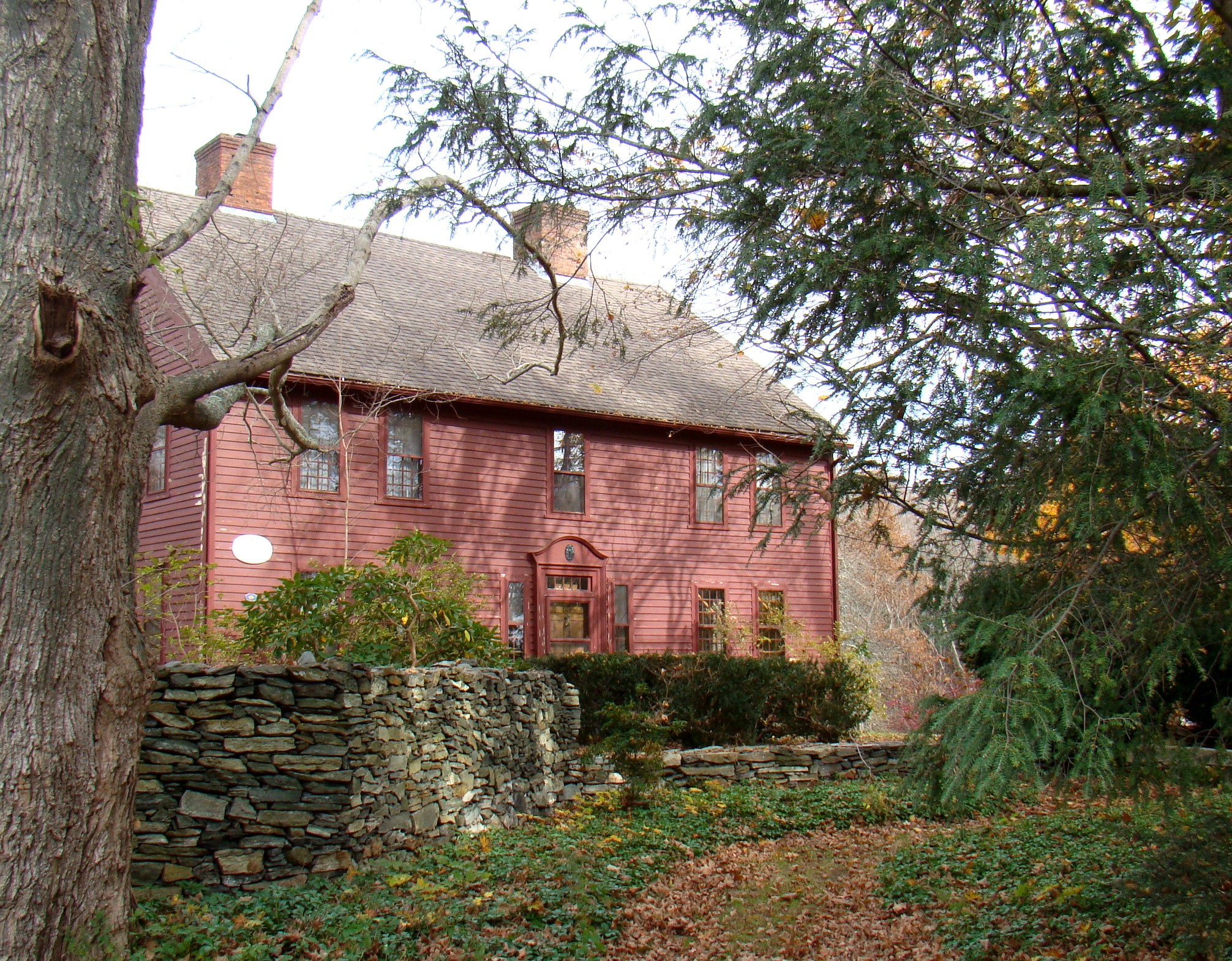

- Location within Connecticut Location within the United States
- Location: Ross Hill Road, Lisbon, Connecticut
- Coordinates: 41°37′19″N 71°59′27″W
- Area: 11.29 acres (4.57 ha)
- Built: 1761
- Architectural style: Georgian
- NRHP reference No.: 82004370
- Added to NRHP: April 15, 1982

The Lathrop-Mathewson-Ross House is a historic house on Ross Hill Road in Lisbon, Connecticut. The house was built in 1761, and is a well-preserved example of Georgian residential architecture with an extensive documentary trail. It was added to the National Register of Historic Places on April 15, 1982.

== Description and history ==
The Lathrop-Mathewson-Ross House is located at 198 Ross Hill Road in rural northeastern Lisbon, on the north side of Ross Hill Road east of Phillips Road. It is a 2 1/2-story wood-frame structure, five bays wide, with a side-gable roof, twin chimneys, clapboard siding, and a stone foundation. Its main entrance is topped by a transom window and framed by a molded wooden surround. The interior follows a typical central hall plan, with delicate scrollwork on the stringerpiece of the staircase on the right side, with original wooden paneling above and below. Much of the interior retains features original to its construction, or to a major 1824 renovation.

The earliest record of the house occurred in the deeded estate of Ezra Lathrop on December 28, 1761, as recorded in the Norwich Land Records, volume 16, page 89. In 1800, the property was purchased by Jeffrey Mathewson, and it remained in the hands of the related Mathewson and Ross families until 1958. Several generations of these families kept detailed diaries and accounts of their lives and happenings related to the property, providing a significant window into rural life of the period. Two residents, Bucklin Mathewson and George Ross, represented the area in the state legislature.

The house was sold on September 12,2022, to a private buyer.

== See also ==
- National Register of Historic Places listings in New London County, Connecticut
