= Andrew Clark House =

Historic house in Connecticut

- U.S. National Register of Historic Places
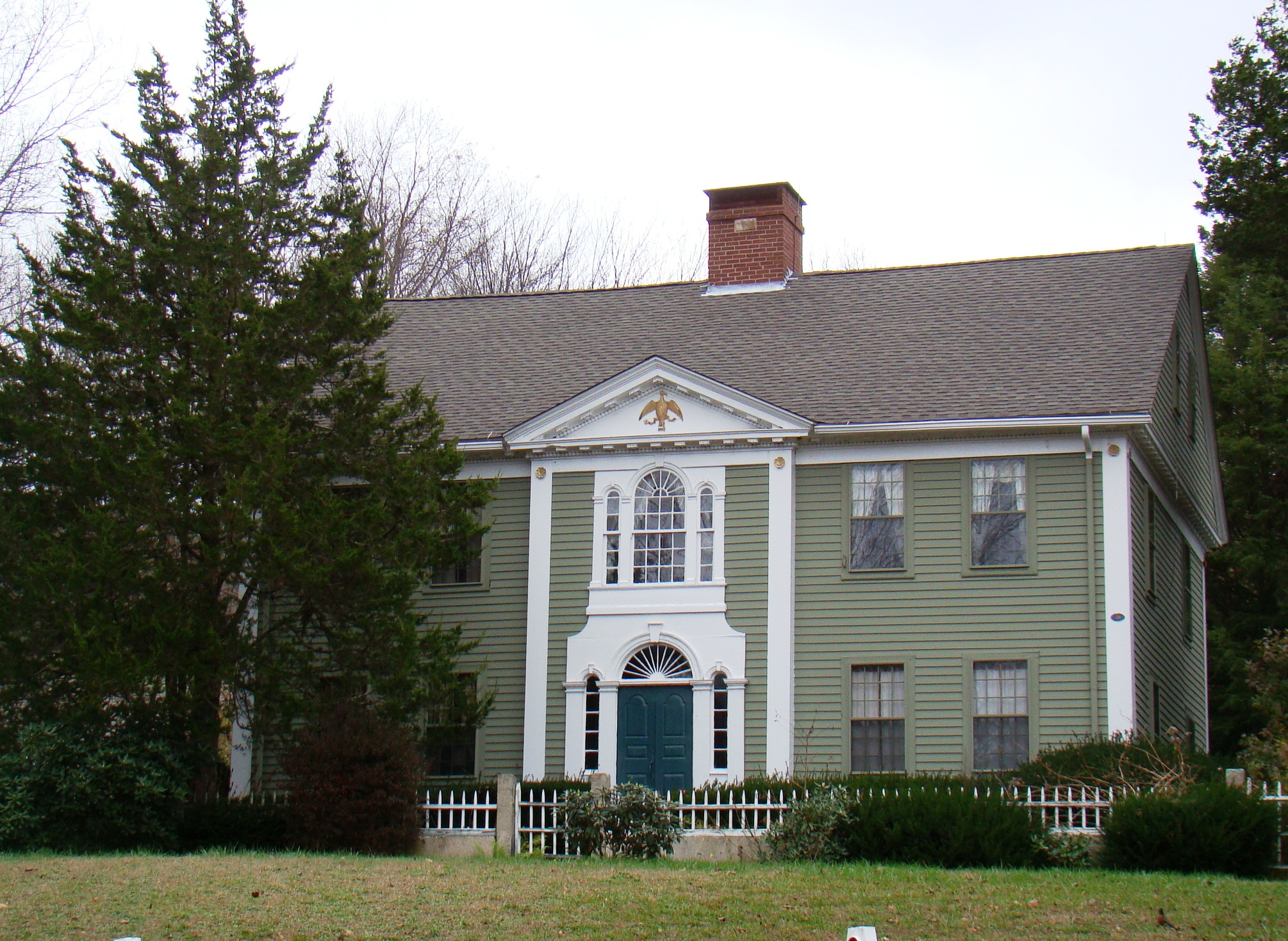

- Location within Connecticut Location within the United States
- Location: Ross Hill Road, Lisbon, Connecticut
- Coordinates: 41°36′35″N 71°59′57″W
- Area: 3.2 acres (1.3 ha)
- Built: 1798
- Architectural style: Georgian
- NRHP reference No.: 79002636
- Added to NRHP: June 28, 1979

The Haskell House, also known as the Andrew Clark House, is a historic house on Ross Hill Road in Lisbon, Connecticut, built around 1798. It is a good example of transitional Georgian-Federal residential architecture. It was listed on the National Register of Historic Places on June 28, 1979.

== Description and history ==
Haskell House stands in a rural area of central Lisbon on the west side of Ross Hill Road, about 0.5 miles (0.80 km) north of Connecticut Route 138. It is a 2 1/2-story wood-frame structure built in 1798 by Capt. Andrew Clark. It is five bays wide with a side-gable roof and a large central chimney. A 1 1/2-story ell extending to the north was the original pre-1728 freestanding farmstead, referred to as “the Elisha Morgan Farm” in 18th century documents. A second ell to the west features a 1750 Rhode Island Cape that was dismantled and moved to the property in 1967 by antiques dealers Jerome and Selma Blum. Much of the hardware and some of the floors from the Rhode Island house were used to complete the main house restoration. The most notable of the house's facade are a second-story Palladian window, an original, hand-carved gilded eagle ornament, a pavilion sheltering the main entrance, and a granite surround topped with picket fencing. The basic structure of the main house is Georgian, but its styling is more Federal, reflecting the transitional period of its 1798 construction date.

Captain Andrew Clark purchased the land in 1792. He was a wealthy farmer who also served as a state representative. This section of the house is presumed to have been built in 1798, based on the panel with that date in the chimney. The panel resembles a similar one in a house in the nearby village of Newent, suggesting that the house was built by an itinerant craftsman. The house passed to Dolly Partridge Haskell after Clark and his wife died.

== See also ==
- National Register of Historic Places listings in New London County, Connecticut
