= Jack Reed =

Jack Reed may refer to:

== People ==
- Jack Reed (baseball) (1933–2022), American baseball player
- John Reed (journalist) (1887–1920), American journalist, poet, and communist activist
- Jack Reed (Mississippi politician) (1924–2016), American businessman and Republican gubernatorial candidate
- Jack Reed (Rhode Island politician) (born 1949), U.S. senator from Rhode Island
- Jack Reed (rugby league) (born 1988), English rugby league footballer
- Jack Carlton Reed (1930–2009), drug smuggler

== Others ==
- Jack Reed (series), a series of television movies starring Brian Dennehy

== See also ==
- John Reed (disambiguation)
- Jack Reid (disambiguation)
- Jackie Reid, minor league baseball pitcher
- Jackie Reid (Taggart), fictional character in the ITV series Taggart
