= John Blake-Reed =

Sir John Seymour Blake-Reed OBE (26 November 1882 – 8 March 1966) was a British judge who served in Colonial Egypt.

== Biography ==
Blake-Reed was born in Pembroke Dock, Pembrokeshire and educated at Manchester Grammar School and Jesus College, Oxford. He was called to the bar by Gray's Inn in 1907, working on the Northern Circuit. After military service in the First World War as a lieutenant in the Royal Navy Volunteer Reserve, Blake-Reed became a judge in Egyptian Native Courts (1919 to 1924), was President of the Land Court in Palestine in 1925, and a judge in the Mixed Court of Cairo (1926 to 1932). His final position was as a judge of the Mixed Court of Appeal in Alexandria (1932 to 1949). He was awarded the OBE in 1919 and knighted in 1950. He was also made a Grand Officer of the Order of the Nile, and was made an Honorary Fellow of Jesus College in 1960. Blake-Reed also published two books of Odes by Horace.

He was found dead on 8 March 1966 in his room at Jesus College, Oxford, aged 83.
