= John Reid (conservationist) =

American conservationist

John Reid is the founder of the Conservation Strategy Fund (CSF), a nonprofit international environmental organization in located in Sebastopol, California. Reid has worked in conservation since 1991, promoting the use of economics to address conservation challenges. Before founding CSF, he held positions with Resources for the Future, Conservation International and Pacific Forest Trust.

To address the challenges inherent in conservation, Reid developed an innovative training program at CSF. The program teaches conservationists how to use practical, policy-relevant analyses on a number of themes in the Amazon rainforest, Central America and the Brazilian Atlantic Forest. These themes include energy and transportation infrastructure, logging, ranching, protected areas and agriculture, among others. He designed CSF as an independent technical organization with the aim of spreading economics skills among conservation professionals. Reid's work has appeared in Scientific American, Conservation Biology, Environment, the Journal of Political Economy, Megadiversidade and Ambio. He speaks Portuguese and Spanish, and holds a master's in Public Policy from Harvard University.
