= George Reade (British Army officer) =

British Army officer and Whig politician

Lieutenant-General George Reade
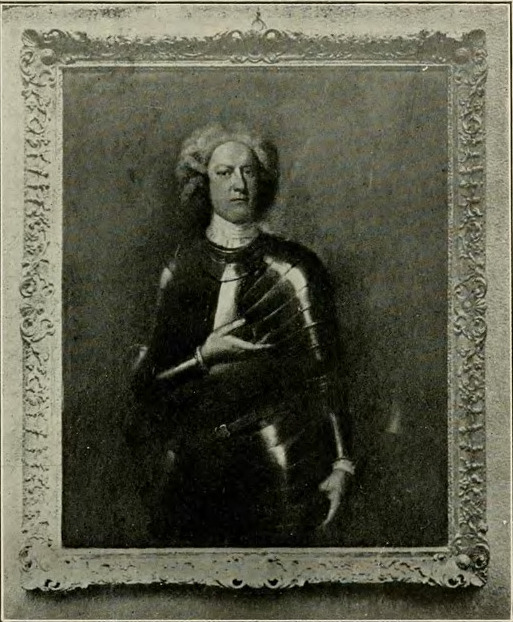

Member of the British Parliament for Tewkesbury
- In office 1722–1734

Personal details
- Born: 1687
- Died: 28 March 1756 (aged 68–69)
- Spouse: Jane Nowes
- Parent: Sir Edward Reade, 2nd Baronet (father)

Military service
- Branch/service: British Army
- Unit: 1st Regiment of Foot Guards; 29th Regiment of Foot; 9th Regiment of Foot; 9th Regiment of Dragoons

George Reade (1687 – 28 March 1756), of Shipton-under-Wychwood, Oxfordshire, was a British Army officer and Whig politician who sat in the House of Commons from 1722 to 1734.

Reade was the fourth son of Sir Edward Reade, 2nd Baronet, and Elizabeth Harby. He entered the Army in 1703 as a lieutenant in the 1st Regiment of Foot Guards, ranking as a captain in the Army. He served several campaigns in the wars of Queen Anne, and was promoted to captain-lieutenant (with the rank of lieutenant-colonel in the Army) in 1708 and captain in 1709.

Reade unsuccessfully stood for election as Member of Parliament for Tewkesbury at a by-election in 1721, but was returned at the general election in 1722 and re-elected without opposition in 1727. He consistently supported the Government. King George II promoted him to the commission of second major of the 1st Foot Guards (with the rank of colonel in the Army) in 1729, and in 1733 appointed him to the colonelcy of the 29th Regiment of Foot. He did not stand at the 1734 British general election. On 28 August 1739 he was removed to the 9th Regiment of Foot. In 1743 he was promoted to the rank of major-general, and to that of lieutenant-general in 1747. In 1749 he was removed to the 9th Regiment of Dragoons, holding that colonelcy to his death.

Reade married Jane Now(es), daughter of Charles Now(es), barrister, of Wood Ditton, Cambridgeshire in 1744. He died on 28 March 1756, without issue.

== Citations ==
Parliament of Great Britain
Preceded by The Viscount Gage; William Dowdeswell	Member of Parliament for Tewkesbury; 1722–1734; With: The Viscount Gage	Succeeded by The Viscount Gage; Robert Tracy
Military offices
Preceded by William Anne Keppel, 2nd Earl of Albemarle	Colonel of the Reade's Regiment of Foot; 1733–1739	Succeeded by Francis Fuller
Preceded by Hon. William Hargrave	Colonel of the Reade's Regiment of Foot; 1739–1749	Succeeded by Sir Charles Armand Powlett
