= John Reid (publisher) =

Scottish publisher, author and radical activist

John Reid (1808–1841?) was a Scottish publisher, author and radical activist.

== Life ==
Born at Paisley on 2 April 1808, he was the second son of John Reid, M.D., by Jean McGavin, sister to William McGavin of Glasgow. After education mostly by his father, he was apprenticed to a firm of booksellers in Glasgow; at the end of the apprenticeship he went to London, and entered the service of Messrs. Black & Young, publishers.

In a few years Reid returned to Glasgow, where he started as bookseller and publisher on his own account. He became involved in social reform and politics, supported Polish exiles, and was one of those who wanted the Earl of Durham to lead a reconstructed radical party in parliament. His political associates included Lord Dudley Stuart, Sir Daniel Macnee the painter, William Weir who became editor of the Daily News, and William Motherwell the poet.

Reid was a traveller, and in 1838 he went to Turkey on an extended visit. In 1840 he gave up his publishing business in Glasgow and went to Hong Kong to edit an English journal and prepare a Chinese dictionary. He died there, in either 1841 or 1842.

== Works ==
Reid is best known as the compiler of Bibliotheca Scoto-Celtica. While studying Gaelic in 1825, a friend asked Reid to catalogue his Gaelic books for him. This led to the compilation of the Bibliotheca Scoto-Celtica, which aimed to be a complete bibliography of books in Gaelic; it was seen in manuscript by Sir John Sinclair, 1st Baronet, in 1827. The Highland Society of London gave it an award in 1831, and it was published in Glasgow by Reid himself in 1832.

Reid published in 1835 a sketch of the Earl of Durham's political career. He contributed to periodicals and published Illustrations of Social Depravity, a series of booklets, Glasgow, 1834. He wrote a memoir for the Posthumous Works (1834) of William McGavin, and in 1840 published Turkey and the Turks, being the Present State of the Ottoman Empire.

== Family ==
Reid married, in 1836, Anne, daughter of Captain John McLaren, High Laws, Berwick on Tweed, with whom he had one daughter.

== Notes ==
Attribution

This article incorporates text from a publication now in the public domain: Lee, Sidney, ed. (1896). "Reid, John (1808-1841?)". Dictionary of National Biography. Vol. 47. London: Smith, Elder & Co.
