= John D. Read =

American abolitionist and lay preacher

Reverend John D Read
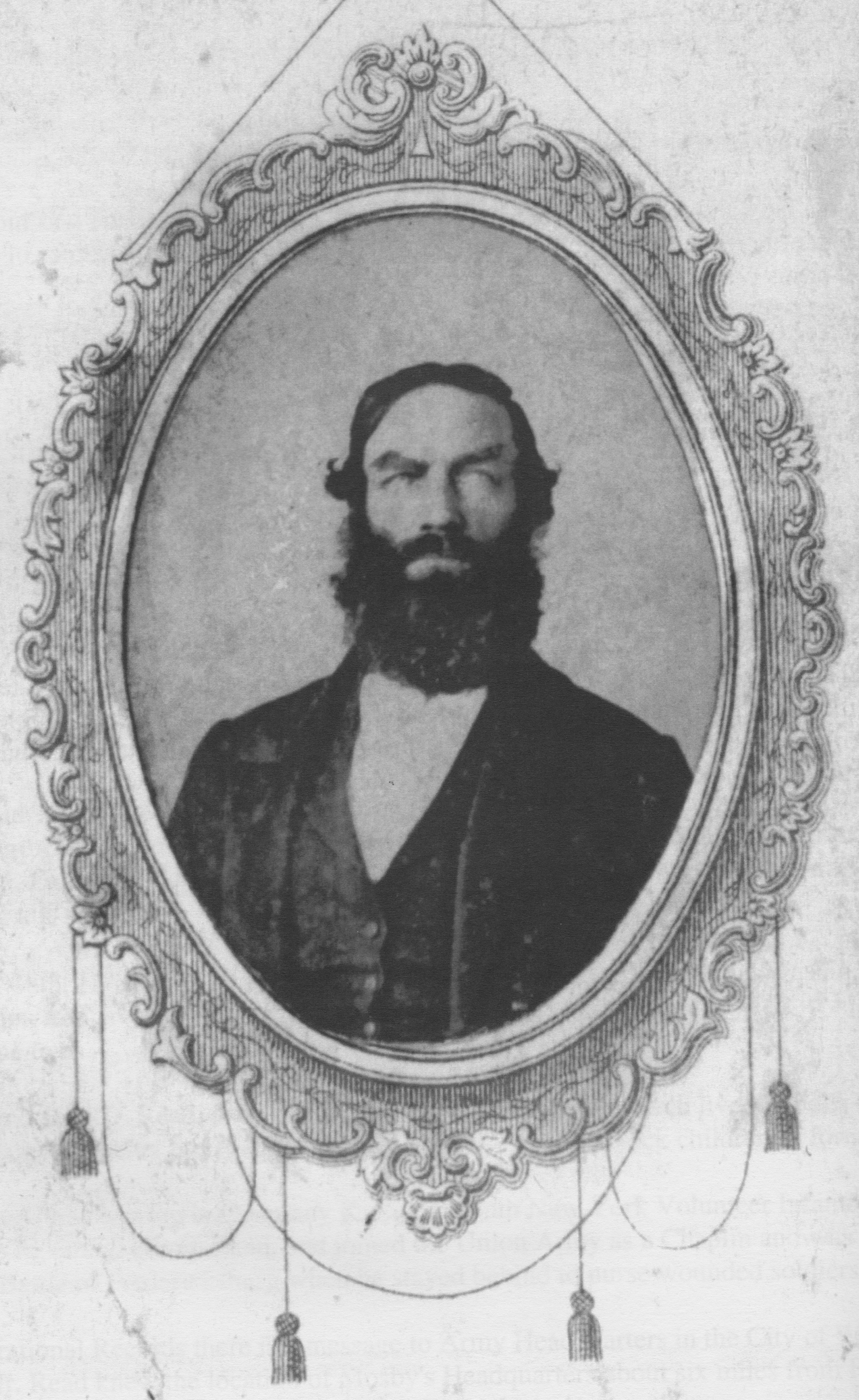
- Born: February 6, 1814; Lisbon, Connecticut
- Died: October 18, 1864 (aged 50); Vienna, Virginia
- Cause of death: Execution by shooting
- Resting place: Falls Church Episcopal Church Cemetery; Falls Church, Virginia
- Occupations: Farmer, lay preacher
- Era: American Civil War
- Known for: Abolitionist, educator, Union spy
- Spouse: Charlotte Read

John D. Read (February 6, 1814 – October 18, 1864), also referred to as John Reed or John Reid, was an American abolitionist and lay preacher in Falls Church, Virginia, in the years prior to and during the American Civil War. Read was taken prisoner by Confederate partisans from Mosby's Rangers during a surprise raid on the town on October 18, 1864, and executed later that day near Vienna, Virginia.

== Early life and prewar activities ==
John Read was born in Lisbon, Connecticut, on February 6, 1814, to a family of prominent Baptist ministers. The family moved to Oswego, New York, and eventually John and his brothers Caleb and Hiram Read, and his sister Miranda Read Chappell, settled in Fairfax County, Virginia, in the 1850s.

The Read brothers, their sister, and their families were original founding members of the Columbia Baptist Church, the first Baptist congregation in the village. Hiram Read, John's younger brother and an ordained minister, served as the church's first pastor from its founding in 1856 to the onset of the Civil War in 1861.

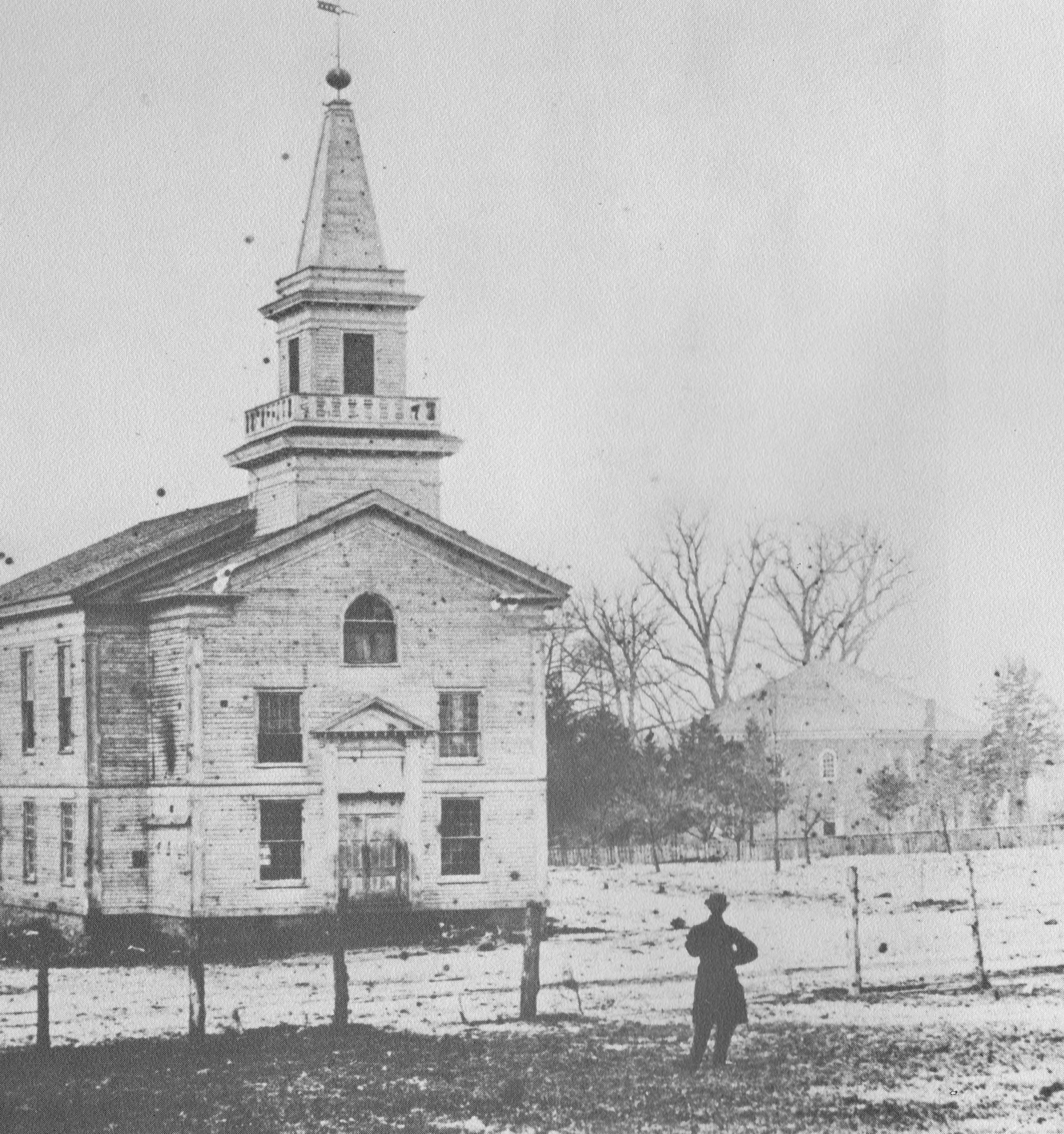
Columbia Baptist Church, Falls Church, Virginia. Taken 1862 by Matthew Brady, photographer.

Although John Read is frequently referred to in local histories as "Reverend", he had no formal seminary training and likely served as a lay minister, preaching on occasion. The 1860 United States census for Fairfax County, Virginia lists his occupation as that of a farmer, living with his wife and five children on land near Bailey's Crossroads, Virginia.

== Wartime activities ==
John Read and his family fled Northern Virginia in July 1861 after the disastrous Union defeat at the Battle of First Manassas and moved to the safety of Washington, D.C. He returned to Falls Church in 1862 once federal forces had occupied the town and lived in his brother's house on Broad Street.

Read remained an outspoken abolitionist and Union supporter in a small Virginia village where many residents had strong secessionist sentiments and family members fighting with Confederate forces. Along with his daughter Betsy, Read established a school in Falls Church to educate the local African American population and the large number of former slaves crossing into Union lines from further south. The father and daughter established both a "Sabbath school" to teach Scripture along with a "day school" where instruction in basic reading and arithmetic were taught to classes as large as fifty to sixty people. Obtaining outside funding for the school was very difficult, and Read appealed to Emily Howland, a Quaker philanthropist and abolitionist, for financial assistance:

"I have made a number of applications, but have not been able to get anything toward sustaining a school among them...Here is a work for somebody to do. The door is open. Men wimmen [sic] and children are anxious to learn. But as they are cut off from all help from the government and the charitable societies it depends up individual alone if an thing is done...I believe these people should not be forgotten or neglected...I am willing to put shoulder to the wheel and the thing rolling so far as I can..."

Read's activities during the war were not confined to education. There is evidence that he provided military intelligence to Union forces in the area regarding the activity of Confederate partisans under the command of John S. Mosby. A Union dispatch dated August 10, 1863, reported the following incident:

"It is reported that one of our cavalry pickets was fired on last night while on duty near Falls Church. A Mr. Reed, resident of that place, says he knows that Mosby's headquarters are only about 5 miles from Falls Church, where he had about 40 men. My cavalry force is not sufficient to send out a large enough party to verify this information and keep up the regular nighly patrols. Very respectfully, G.A. DeRussy, Brigadier-General, Commanding."

John Read was an active member of the local citizen militia, the Union Home Guard. The Home Guard was drawn from the male civilians of the town and integrated significant numbers of African Americans in the force. These armed and unarmed men patrolled the town at night to protect against raids from Confederate forces, and developed a system of signal horns to alert the regular Union forces in the event of an attack.

== The raid on Falls Church ==
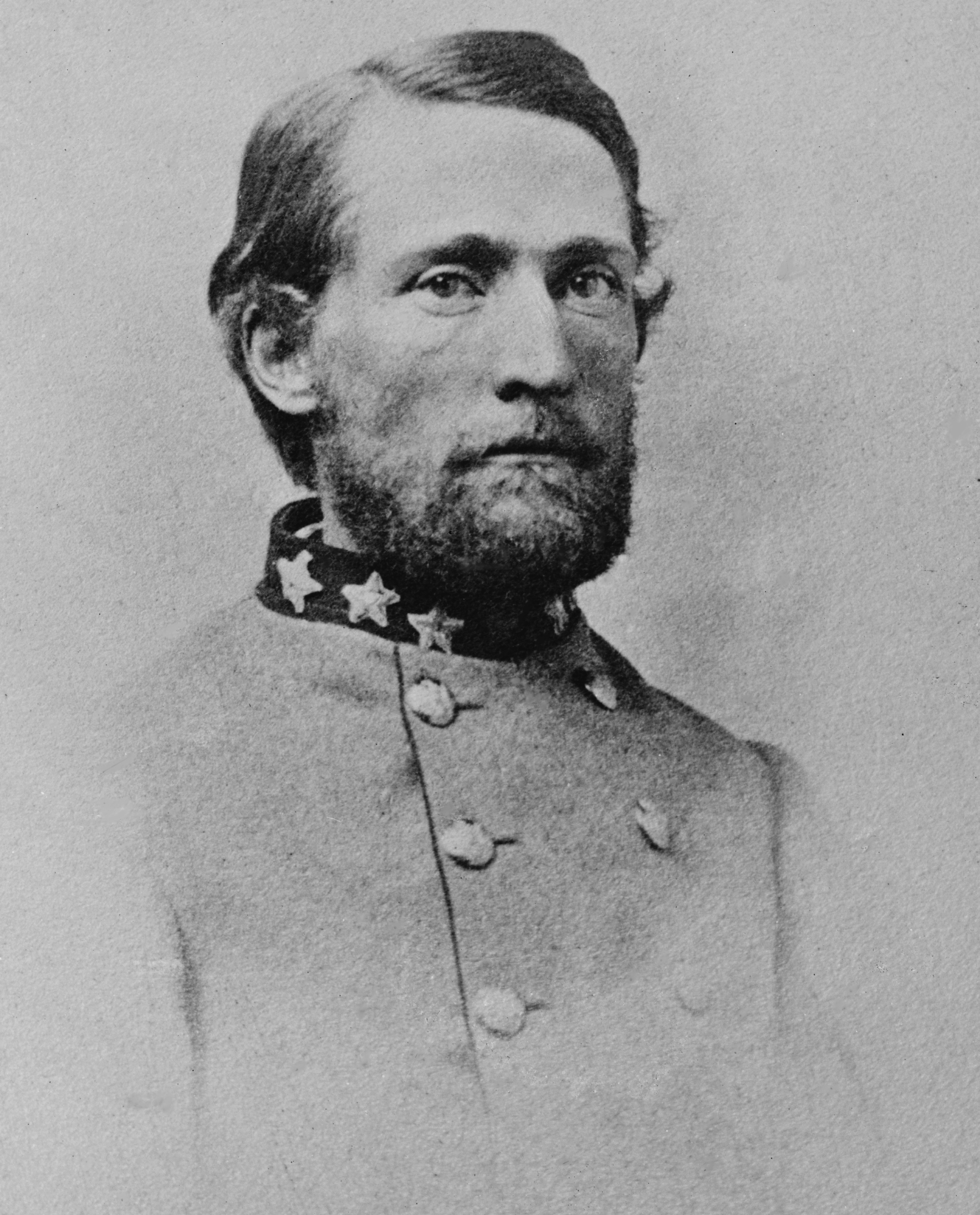
Colonel John S. Mosby, CSA

The forces of Colonel John Singleton Mosby's 43rd Battalion, Virginia Cavalry conducted an extensive guerrilla campaign behind Union lines in Northern Virginia from 1863 to 1865. In 1864, towns and Union outposts in Fairfax and Loudon Counties were frequent targets of surprise attacks from mounted cavalry from Mosby's Rangers seeking to capture Federal horses, supplies, and prisoners.

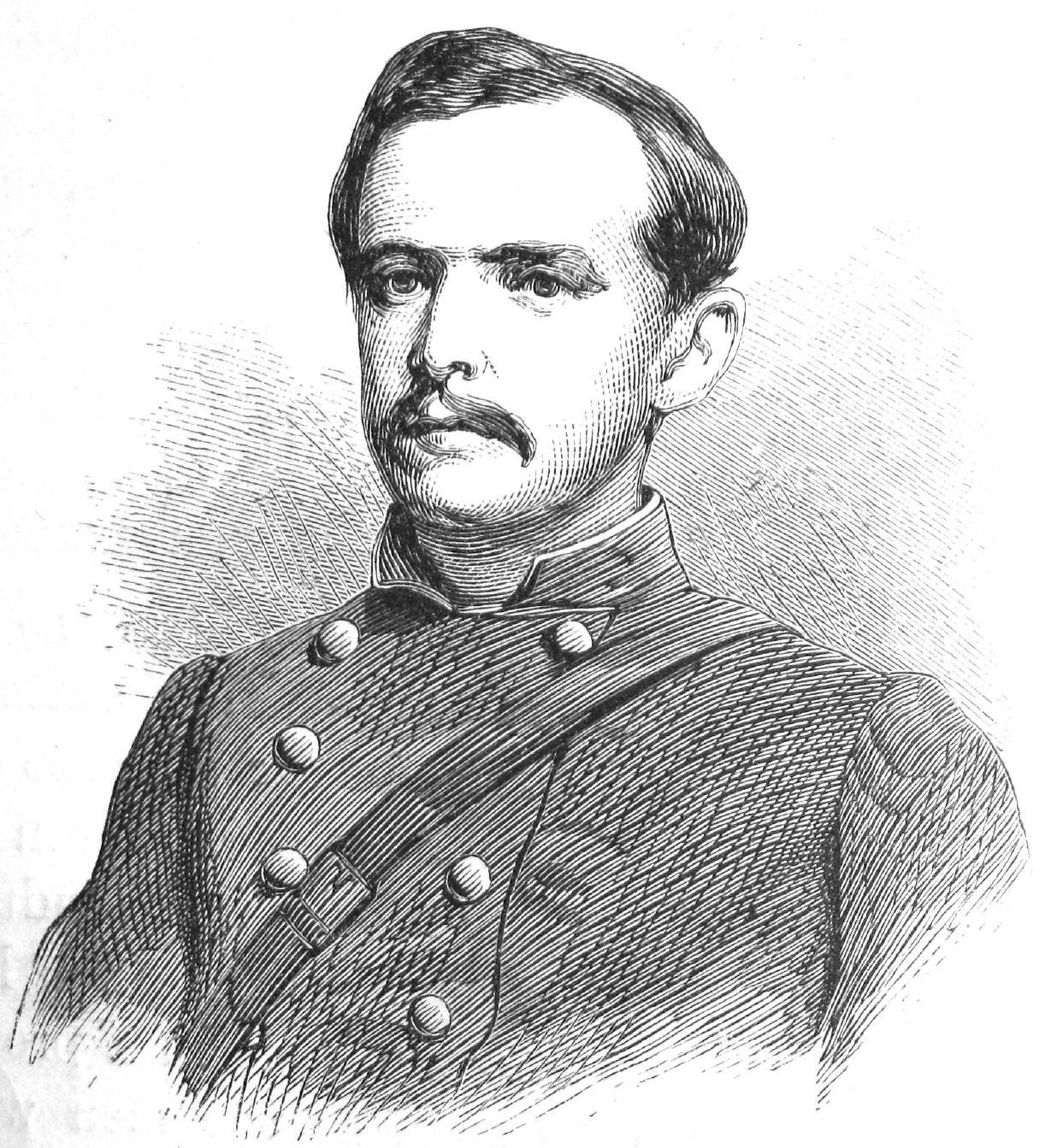
Captain Montjoy, wood engraving 1867

On the early morning of October 18, 1864, Captain Richard Montjoy led a contingent of at least 75 men from Company D of Mosby's command on a nocturnal raid into Falls Church. The attack was initially successful, capturing several Union prisoners and a number of horses. However, the element of surprise was lost when members of the Home Guard blew a hunting horn as a warning to alert nearby Federal troops.

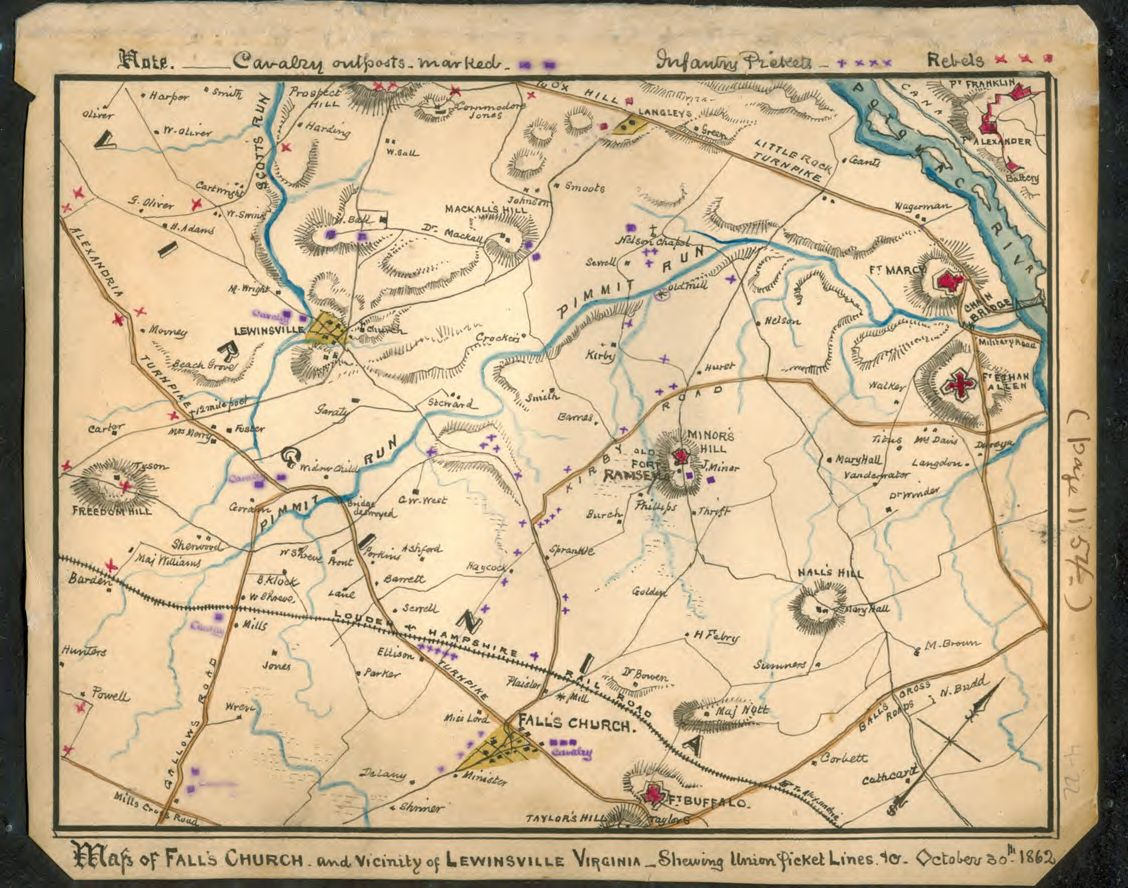
Union Army Map of Falls Church Virginia drawn by Robert Knox Sneden, 1862.

== Read's capture and execution ==
Members of the Home Guard engaged the Confederates, and a local black man, Frank Brooks was killed. John Read and another African American, Jacob Jackson, were taken prisoner by the rebels. Montjoy and his men made a hasty retreat and headed west up the Alexandria Turnpike (current Leesburg Pike) toward present day Tysons Corner and Vienna.

Read and Jackson were taken to a pine grove near where the Washington & Old Dominion railroad crosses the Piney Branch tributary of Difficult Run, and shot in the head at close range. Read was killed instantly, with the official Union army report stating that:

"There is no doubt concerning the murder of Mr. Reed, the surgeon, who has made an examination of the body, states the skull at the base of the brain is blown to atoms, and the flesh about the wound is filled with powder, as if the pistol had been placed close to the head."

Jackson miraculously survived the attempted execution with the loss of an ear, and was able to walk back to Falls Church to notify the Read family. Read's daughter and sister in law were forced to retrieve the body themselves when Union troops declined to do so for fear of encountering Mosby's forces that may have remained in the area.

== Aftermath of Read's killing ==
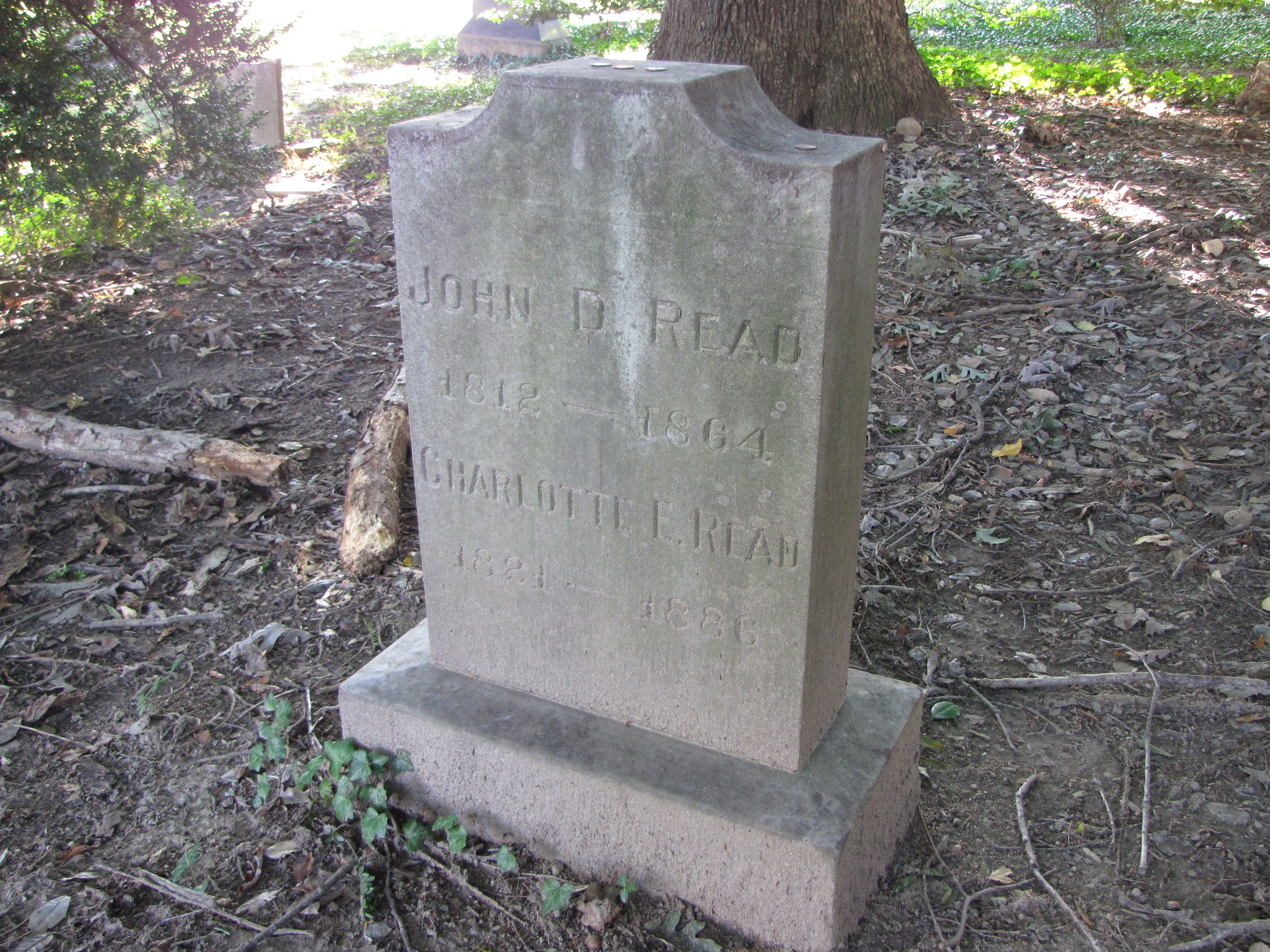
The gravestone of John D Read, at the Falls Church Episcopal Church.

John Read was buried in the graveyard at The Falls Church Episcopal, where he lies next to his wife and daughter.

After her father's execution, Betsy Read closed her school for freedmen. She wrote to Emily Howland on October 23, 1864, informing her that,

"I have before me three letters from you addressed to My Father. Who is no more in this world. Miss Howland it is sad news to tell but My Dear Father has been shot yes cruely murderd by the Rebels. As to the school I had concluded to take, I do not now feal as though I wanted to have any thing to do with it...I do not think it would be advisable at this present time for any one to commence a school that is a colord School for at this time the Rebs are looking down on us And I should not be surprised if they should come down here again tonight..."

Emily Howland herself wrote a tribute to John Read, stating that, "He was much interested in the improvement and elevation of the colored people, which marked him for the hatred of the misguided wretches who rob and murder in the interest of slavery."

Read's death was reported in both local and Northern newspapers. The Evening Star in Washington, D.C., proclaimed his killing as an example of "Rebel Diabolism" and accused Mosby's men of committing "some of the most devilish deeds of cold blooded murder ever recorded" by "cutting his throat from ear to ear." A Columbus Ohio newspaper lamented that "the guerrillas of Mosby's gang are becoming bold in their depredations" and "these outrages so near to Washington are beginning to be regarded as a serious disgrace."

== Modern memorials to John Read ==
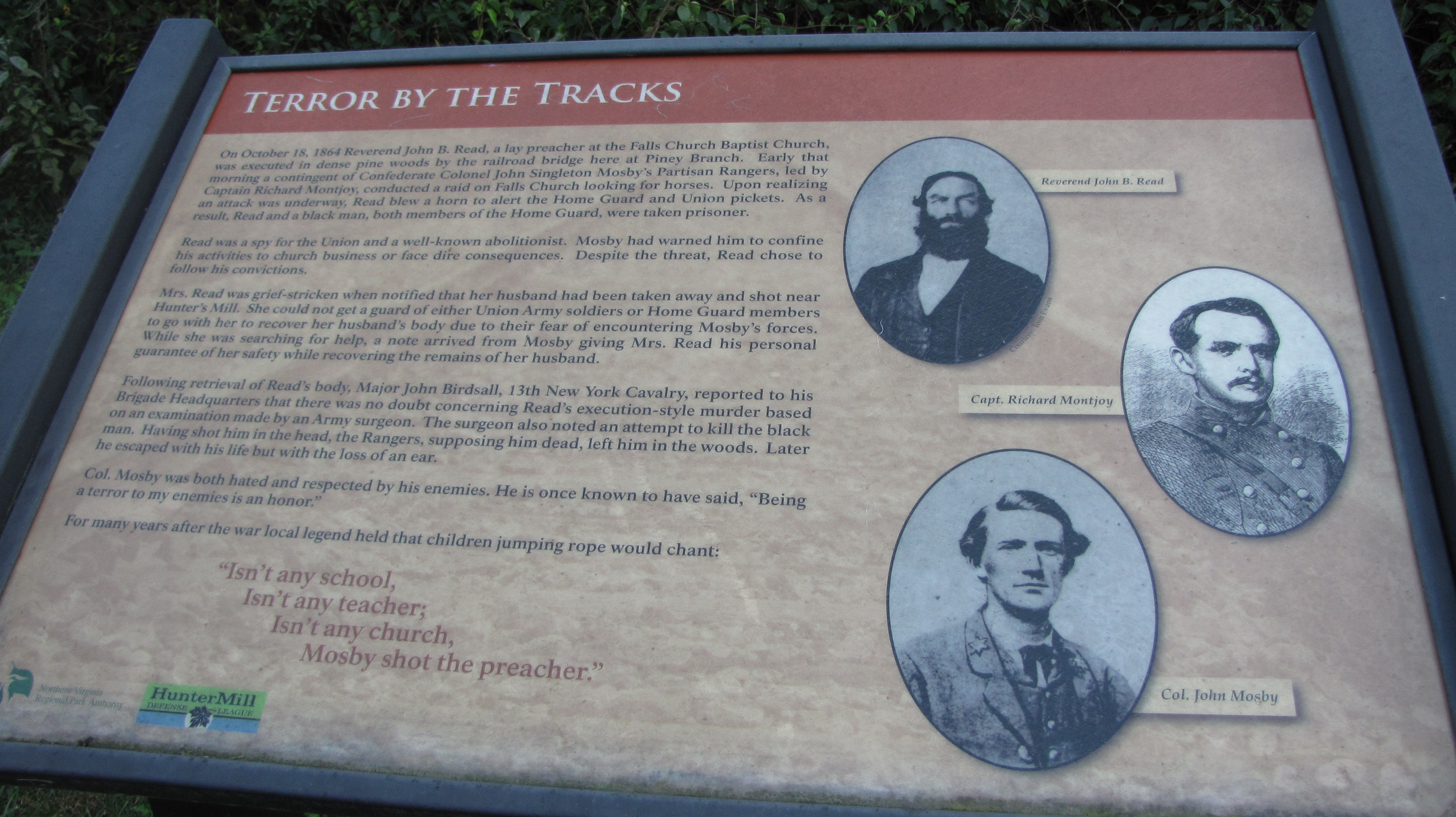
Historical marker on W+OD Park at site of Read execution.

The events of Read's killing are commemorated in a historical marker at mile marker 13.6 on the Washington and Old Dominion Regional Park entitled "Terror by the Tracks" which relates the details of his life and execution. A plaque describing the raid on Falls Church by Mosby's men, entitled "Living in Fear" was placed at 440 West Broad Street as part of the Virginia Civil War Trails system.

== Read family ==
Read’s brother, the Rev. Benjamin L. Read, a Baptist Missionary, lived in Wisconsin, Michigan, and Illinois. He and his wife Sarah Read later relocated to Trading Post, Kansas. In 1858 the Rev. Benjamin Read was rescued by Sarah after being shot and left to die by Missouri slave catchers in the "Marias Des Cygnes Massacre". Rev. Read survived and later served as the Chaplain of the Kansas 15th Cavalry under Charles Jennison. He later became a Justice of the Peace in Osawatomie, Kansas, and was listed as an honored guest from Kansas at the Colored People’s Convention in Boston, Mass, in 1865. The Rev. Benjamin L. Read is listed on the "Marias Des Cygnes Martyrs Memorial" monument near Trading Post, dedicated to those both wounded and killed there.
