= John M. Reid (footballer) =

Scottish footballer

John Reid
Personal information
- Full name: John M Reid
- Place of birth: Scotland
- Position: Outside right

Youth career
- Kingseat Boys Club

Senior career*
Years	Team	Apps	(Gls)
1952–1954	Dunfermline Athletic	9	(1)
1954–1956	Queen's Park	42	(8)

International career
1955–1956	Scotland Amateurs	5	(1)
- * Club domestic league appearances and goals

John M. Reid is a Scottish retired football outside right who played in the Scottish League for Queen's Park. He was capped by Scotland at amateur level.
