= John Reid (rugby union) =

Irish rugby union player

- Full name: John Lewis Reid
- Born: 16 April 1909 Bandon, County Cork, Ireland
- Died: 1 July 1994 (aged 85) Shepway, Kent, England

Rugby union career
- Position: Out-half
International career
| Years | Team | Apps | (Points) |
| 1934 | Ireland | 2 | (0) |

John Lewis Reid (16 April 1909 – 1 July 1994) was an Irish international rugby union player.

Born in Bandon, County Cork, Reid was an English-based halfback with Oxford University (no blue), Middlesex Hospital and Richmond. He gained an Ireland call up in 1934 as a replacement for out-half Eugene Davy, who was sidelined with a fractured thumb. Capped twice, Reid appeared against Scotland at Murrayfield and Wales at Swansea.

== See also ==
- List of Ireland national rugby union players
