= Sir John Reade, 1st Baronet =

Sir John Reade, 1st Baronet (c. 1616–1694) has the unusual distinction of being granted a baronetcy by both Charles I and the Lord Protector Oliver Cromwell. (Note: His name is also spelt John Read.)

== Biography ==
Reade was of an ancient family, originally of Morpeth, in Northumberland. He was born about 1616 the was the fourth son of John Reade (and grandson of Sir Thomas Reade, of Barton, in Berkshire), and of Mary daughter and co-heir of Sir John Brocket, of Brocket Hall. (Note: His eldest brother Walter died in 1639, Thomas died in 1634 but left a son Compton, Richard, born in 1610 and living in 1623 is thought to have died before his father.) He was admitted to Lincoln's Inn on 7 June 1632.

John Reade of Brocket Hall, Hertfordshire, was knighted at Newmarket on 12 March 1642, (Note: Dates in this article use the Julian calendar with the start of year adjusted to 1 January (see Old Style and New Style dates)) and four days later created a baronet by Charles I on 16 March 1642.

During the Interregnum Reade held two offices under the Commonwealth. He was appointed Commissioner for Hertfordshire in November 1650 and was Sheriff of Hertfordshire in the year 1655/1656.

The creation of the baronetcy (as were all others after 4 January 1642) was disallowed by the Act to make void all Titles of Honours, Dignities, or Precedencies, given by the late King since the 4th January, 1642 on 4 February 1652, so the Lord Protector Oliver Cromwell gave him a new patent 25 June 1657 (this was the first hereditary honour bestowed by the Protector).

The Cromwellian dignity was however, disallowed after the Restoration in May 1660, but, on the other hand, the disallowance of the former Baronetcy of 1642 then ceased, and he obtained a pardon on 7 June 1660, for all offences during the Civil War and the Commonwealth.

He was Sheriff of Hertfordshire for a second time in the year 1673/1674, and was also elected as such November 1671, November 1676, and November 1677, but did not take up the position. On 20 January 1679, he purchased the estate of Calthorpe, Oxfordshire. He died and was buried on 6 February 1694 in the Brocket chapel at Hatfield.

== Family ==
On 2 January 1640 Reade married Susan (died 1657), daughter of Sir Thomas Style of Wateringbury and Susan daughter of Robert Foulkes, with whom he had a son and heir Sir James (died 1701). She was buried 18 May 1657 in the Brocket chapel at Hatfield

On 15 January 1663 Reade married secondly, at St Nicholas Acons, London, Alisimon, widow of Francis Pierrepont. They separated after about three years and she was living 6 May 1682.

Compton Reade, the son of Thomas who was eldest grandson of previously mentioned Sir Thomas Read, of Barton, in Berkshire on 4 March 1660.

== Notes ==
Baronetage of England
New creation	Baronet (of Brocket Hall); 1642–1694	Succeeded by James Reade
