= John Rede =

16th-century English politician

John Rede or Reade (by 1509 – 27 September 1557) was an English politician and member of the court staff. An early tutor of Arthur, Prince of Wales, son of Henry VII of England was named John Rede.

He was born before 1509. He was keeper of the wardrobe at York Place in 1530 and at Westminster from 1533 until his death in 1557.

He was elected to Parliament as Member of Parliament for Westminster in 1547.

He married twice: firstly Joan, widow of John Trower of Westminster, and secondly Alice Bentley, widow of Richard Mody of London.

He was buried at St Martins-in-the-Fields, where he had been churchwarden from 1542 to 1544.
