= Reade baronets =

Extinct baronetcy in the Baronetage of England

There have been two baronetcies created for members of the Reade (or Read) family, both in the Baronetage of England. Both creations are now extinct.

The Reade Baronetcy, of Brocket Hall in the County of Hertford, was created in the Baronetage of England on 16 March 1642 for John Reade. The title became dormant on the death of the third Baronet in 1712.

The Reade Baronetcy, of Barton in the County of Berkshire (now Oxfordshire), was created in the Baronetage of England on 4 March 1661 for Compton Reade. He was the nephew of the first Baronet of the 1642 creation. The fourth Baronet sat as Member of Parliament for Cricklade. Lieutenant-General George Reade, fourth son of the second Baronet, was Member of Parliament for Tewkesbury. The title became extinct on the death of the thirteenth baronet in 2012.

== Reade baronets, of Brocket Hall (1642) ==
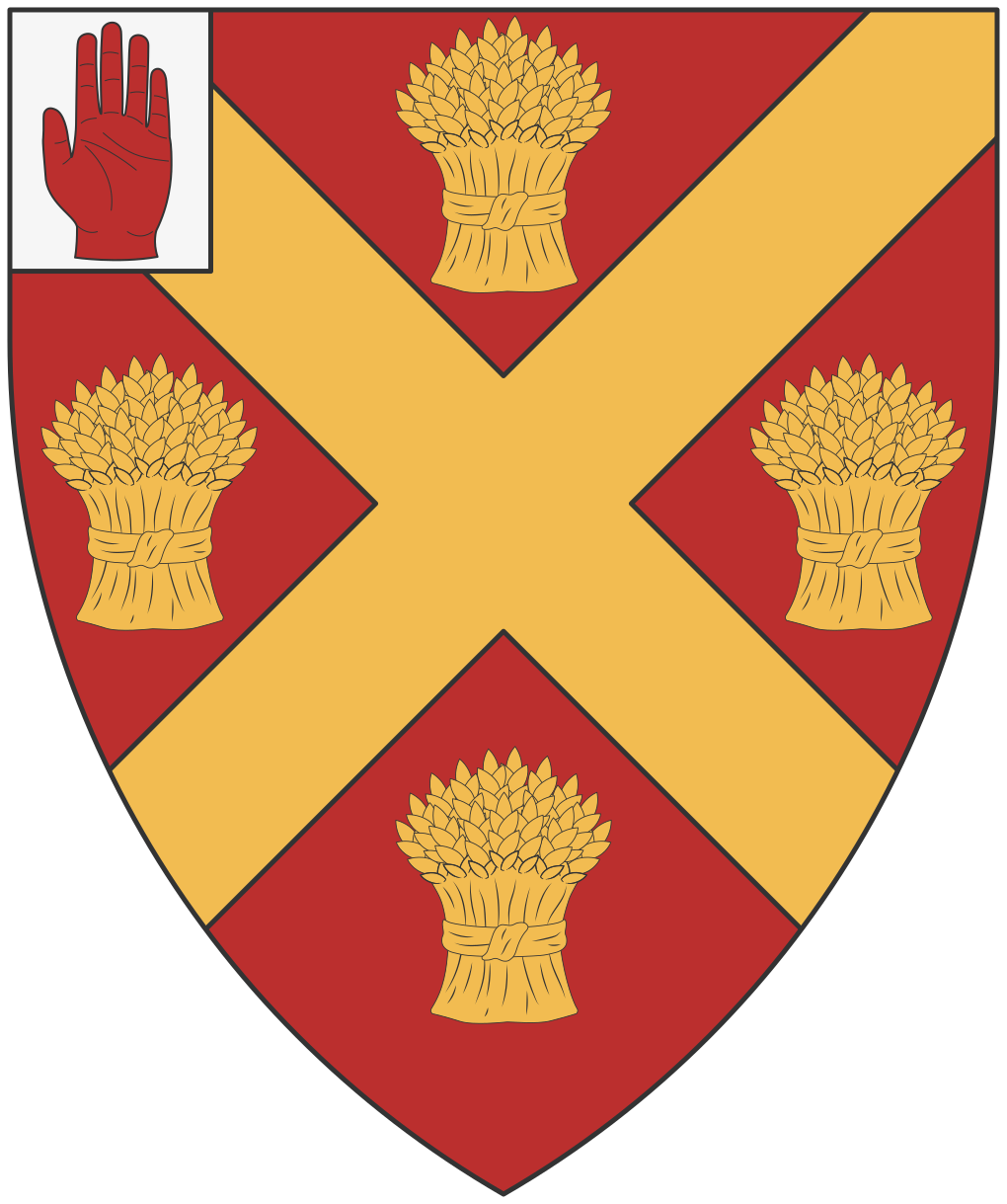
Arms of Reade of Brocket

- Sir John Reade, 1st Baronet (c. 1616–1694)
- Sir James Reade, 2nd Baronet (1655–1701)
- Sir John Reade, 3rd Baronet (1691–1712)

== Reade baronets, of Barton (1661) ==
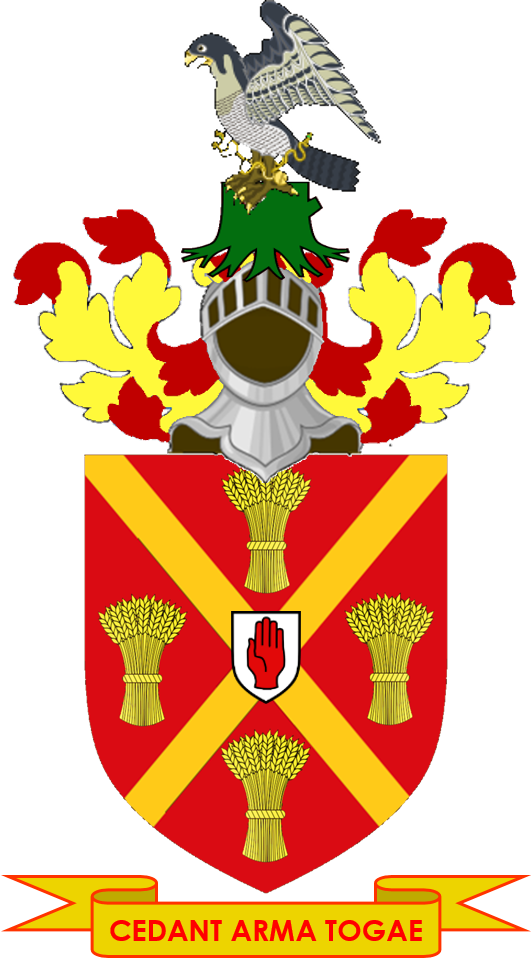
Arms: Gules a Saltire between four Garbs Or; Crest: On the Stump of a Tree Vert a Falcon rising proper belled and jessed Or; Motto: Cedant Arma Togae (May war give way to peace)

- Sir Compton Reade, 1st Baronet (1625–1679)
- Sir Edward Reade, 2nd Baronet (1659–1691)
- Sir Winwood Reade, 3rd Baronet (1682–1692)
- Sir Thomas Reade, 4th Baronet (c. 1684–1752)
- Sir John Reade, 5th Baronet (1721–1773)
- Sir John Reade, 6th Baronet (1762–1789)
- Sir John Chandos Reade, 7th Baronet (1785–1868)
- Sir Chandos Stanhope Reade, 8th Baronet (1851–1890)
- Sir George Compton Reade, 9th Baronet (1845–1908)
- Sir George Reade, 10th Baronet (1869–1923)
- Sir John Reade, 11th Baronet (1896–1958)
- Sir Clyde Nixon Reade, 12th Baronet (1906–1982)
- Sir Kenneth Roy Reade, 13th Baronet (1926–2012)
