= Watkins (surname) =

Watkins is an English and Welsh surname derived as a patronymic from Watkin, in turn a diminutive of the name Watt (also Wat), a popular Middle English given name itself derived as a pet form of the name Walter.

Notable people with the surname include:

- A. W. Watkins (1895–1970), English sound engineer
- Aaron Watkins (golfer) (born 1982), American golfer
- Aaron S. Watkins (1863–1941), American academic and politician
- Alan Watkins (1933–2010), Welsh journalist
- Alfred Watkins (1855–1935), English proponent of ley lines, pioneer photographer, author
- Alfred Ernest Watkins (1878–1957), Welsh footballer
- Ali Watkins (born 1992), American journalist
- Allan Watkins (1922–2011), Welsh cricketer
- Ann E. Watkins, American mathematician
- Anna Watkins (born 1983), English rower
- Arnold Hirst Watkins (1851–1926), English–born South African politician
- Arthur E. Watkins (1898–1967), English botanist
- Arthur Vivian Watkins (1886–1973), American politician
- Ashlyn Watkins (born 2003), American women's basketball player
- Austin Watkins (born 1998), American football player
- Barry Watkins (1921–2004), Welsh footballer
- Benjamin Watkins (1884–1963), Australian politician
- Ben Watkins (musician), English musician, leader of Juno Reactor
- Beverly Watkins (1939–2019), American blues guitarist
- Bill Watkins (disambiguation), multiple people
- Blaine Watkins, American politician
- Bob Watkins (born 1948), American baseball player
- Boyce Watkins (born 1971), American economist, academic and social commentator
- Bruce R. Watkins (1924–1980), American activist
- Calvert Watkins (1933–2013), American linguist
- Carlene Watkins (born 1952), American actress
- Carleton Watkins (1829–1916), American photographer
- Carlos Watkins (born 1993), American football player
- Charles Watkins (disambiguation), multiple people
- Charlie Watkins (footballer) (1921–1998), Scottish professional football player and manager
- Charlie Watkins (audio engineer) (1923–2014), British audio engineer
- Chloe Watkins (born 1992), Irish field hockey player
- Christine Watkins (born 1950), American politician
- Claire Vaye Watkins (born 1984), American author
- Craig Watkins (born 1967), American lawyer
- D. Watkins (born 1980), American author
- Daniel Watkins (businessman) (1918–1982), New Zealand businessman
- Danny Watkins (born 1984), American football player
- Darren Watkins Jr. (born 2005), known professionally as IShowSpeed, American YouTuber and streamer
- Darryl Watkins (born 1984), American basketball player
- David Watkins (disambiguation), also Dave Watkins, multiple people
- Dean Watkins, American engineer and candidate for Vice-president
- Derek Watkins (disambiguation), also Derrick Watkins, multiple people
- Diante Watkins (born 1990), American basketball player
- Doc Watkins (born 1981), American musician
- Doug Watkins (1934–1962), American jazz bassist
- Dudley D. Watkins (1907–1969), English comics artist and Desperate Dan creator
- Edgar Watkins (1887–1960), British gymnast
- Edward Watkins (disambiguation), multiple people
- Elizabeth Watkins (1923–2012), English author
- Elliott Watkins, actor
- Elwyn Watkins (born 1963), British politician
- Emily Watkins, British chef
- Emma Watkins (born 1989), Australian singer, actress, and dancer
- Enid Watkins (1890–1971), American singer and dancer
- Eric Watkins (rugby) (1880–1949), New Zealand rugby footballer
- Eric Watkins (philosopher) (born 1964), American philosopher
- Ernest Watkins (disambiguation), multiple people
- Fenwick Watkins (1887–1943), American athlete and coach
- Francis N. Watkins (1813–1885), American politician and judge from Virginia
- Frank Watkins (disambiguation), multiple people
- Frederick Watkins (disambiguation), also Fred Watkins, multiple people
- George D. Watkins (1924–2026), American physicist
- Geraint Watkins (born 1951), Welsh musician
- Gérard Watkins (born 1965), English actor
- Gino Watkins (1907–1932), British Arctic explorer
- Glenn Watkins (1927–2021), American musicologist
- Gloria Watkins (1952–2021), African-American writer known as bell hooks
- Gordon Watkins (1907–1974), American football player
- Gordon Samuel Watkins (1889–1970), American labor economist and university administrator
- Guy H. Watkins (1831–1864), American lawyer and army officer
- Harry Watkins (disambiguation), multiple people
- Harvey Watkins (1869–1949), American baseball manager
- Harvey Watkins Jr. (born 1954), American musician
- Hays T. Watkins Jr. (1926-2022), CEO of CSX Corporation
- Henry Watkins (disambiguation), multiple people
- Hugh Watkins (disambiguation), multiple people
- Ian Watkins (disambiguation), multiple people
- Islwyn Watkins (1938–2018), Welsh artist
- Jackie Watkins (born 1949), Australian politician
- Jacoby Watkins (born 1984), American football coach
- Jameel Watkins (born 1977), American basketball player
- Jamir Watkins (born 2001), American basketball player
- James Watkins (disambiguation), multiple people
- Jaylen Watkins (born 1991), American football player
- J. Elfreth Watkins (1852–1903), American engineer
- Jenny Watkins-Isnardi, Welsh singer
- Jason Watkins (disambiguation), multiple people
- Jessica Watkins (born 1988), American astronaut
- Jim Watkins (disambiguation), also Jimmy Watkins, multiple people
- John Watkins (disambiguation), multiple people
- Jordan Watkins (born 2002), American football player
- Joseph Watkins (disambiguation), multiple people
- JuJu Watkins (born 2005), American basketball player
- Kallum Watkins (born 1991), British rugby league footballer
- Kat Watkins, Welsh disability rights activist
- Kathleen Watkins (1934–2024), Irish broadcaster, actress, and musician, wife of Gay Byrne
- Kit Watkins (born 1953), American musician
- Kobie Watkins (born 1975), American percussionist
- Larry Watkins (born 1946), American football player
- Leonard Watkins (1859–1901), Welsh international rugby player
- Les Watkins (1914–1974), Australian rules footballer
- Levi Watkins (1944–2015), American heart surgeon and civil rights activist
- Linda Watkins (1908–1976), American actress
- Linda R. Watkins (born 1954), American biochemists and physiologists
- Logan Watkins (born 1989), American baseball player
- Lovelace Watkins (1933–1995), American singer
- Luke Watkins (born 1989), British boxer
- Lynn B. Watkins (1836–1901), American judge
- Margaret Watkins (1884–1969), Canadian photographer
- Marley Watkins (born 1990), Welsh footballer
- Mart Watkins (1880–1942), Welsh footballer
- Mary Watkins (born 1939), American musician and composer
- Mary Watkins, Baroness Watkins of Tavistock (born 1955), British peer
- Matt Watkins (born 1986), Canadian hockey player
- Matthew Watkins (1978–2020), Welsh rugby union player
- Maurice Watkins (disambiguation), multiple people
- Maurine Dallas Watkins (1896?–1969), American dramatist
- Mel Watkins (1932–2020), Canadian economist
- Mel Watkins (American writer) (born 1940), American critic and author
- Melvin Watkins (born 1954), American basketball coach
- Michael Watkins (disambiguation), multiple people
- Michaela Watkins (born 1971), American actress
- Mike Watkins (disambiguation), multiple people
- Nathan Watkins (born 1977), American soccer player
- Nora Watkins, New Zealand footballer
- Ollie Watkins (born 1995), English footballer
- Oscar Ferris Watkins (1877–1943), British colonial administrator
- Paul Watkins (disambiguation), multiple people
- Peter Watkins (1935–2025), English film director
- Peter Watkins (civil servant) (born 1959), British civil servant
- Peter Watkins (politician) (born 1929), Australian politician
- Philip Watkins (1930–1995), English politician and accountant
- Quez Watkins (born 1998), American football player
- Rachel J. Watkins, American biocultural anthropologist and educator
- Ray Watkins, Canadian ice hockey player
- Richard Watkins (disambiguation), multiple people
- Roderick Watkins (born 1964), English composer
- Roger Watkins (1948–2007), American film director
- Rokevious Watkins (born 1989), American football player
- Ron Watkins, American conspiracy theorist and imageboard administrator
- Ronald Watkins (1904–2001), British drama teacher
- Ruth Watkins, American speech pathologist and academic administrator
- Ryan Watkins (born 1983), Welsh cricketer
- Samuel R. Watkins (1839–1901), American author and humorist
- Sammy Watkins (born 1993), American footballer
- Sammy Watkins (musician), fl. 1920s–1960s
- Sara Watkins (born 1981), American musician
- Sean Watkins (born 1977), American guitarist
- Sherron Watkins (born 1959), American executive, Enron vice president
- Sid Watkins (1928–2012), English surgeon and race doctor
- Simon Watkins, English cricketer
- Skeeter Watkins (1915–1987), American baseball player
- Spenser Watkins (born 1992), American baseball player
- Steven Watkins (disambiguation), also Steve, and Stephen Watkins, multiple people
- Stuart Watkins (born 1941), Welsh international rugby player
- Susan Watkins (1875 – 1913), American artist
- Sylvania Watkins (born 1985), American basketball player
- Tasker Watkins (1918–2007), Welsh judge and Victoria Cross recipient
- Thomas Watkins (disambiguation), multiple people
- Tionne Watkins (born 1970), American singer
- Tobias Watkins (1780–1855), American physician, essayist and government official
- Tom Watkins (disambiguation), also Tommy Watkins, multiple people
- Tony Watkins, New Zealand architect
- Torrance Watkins (born 1949), American equestrian
- Travis E. Watkins (1920–1950), American Medal of Honor recipient
- Trevor Watkins, British archaeologist
- Tuc Watkins (born 1966), American actor
- Vernon Watkins (1906–1967), Welsh poet
- Walter H. Watkins (1878–1937), American football coach
- Wes Watkins (1938–2025), American politician
- William Watkins (disambiguation), multiple people
- Winifred Watkins (1924–2003), British biochemist
- Winston Watkins (born 2007), American football player
- Yolanda Watkins, American mental health professional

== See also ==
- Atkins (surname)
- Walter (name)
- Watkin
- Watkinson
- Watling
- Watson (surname)
- Watt (surname)
- Watts (surname)
- Latham & Watkins, American legal firm
