= Gwatkin =

Gwatkin is a surname. Notable people with the surname include:

- Frank Ashton-Gwatkin (1889–1976), British diplomat
- Henry Melvill Gwatkin (1844–1916), British theologian and historian
- Norman Gwatkin (1899–1971), British officer and courtier
- Phil Gwatkin (1929–2006)), English footballer
- Robert Lovell Gwatkin (1757–1843), High Sheriff of Cornwall
- Theophila Gwatkin (1757–1848), British painter
- Thomas Gwatkin (1741–1800), English cleric and academic
- Willoughby Garnons Gwatkin (1859–1925), British general who served with the Canadian army during World War 1

== Fictional people ==
- Daniel Gwatkin, in the song "The Unfortunate Gwatkin" on the 2014 album Urge for Offal by the band Half Man Half Biscuit
- Rowland Gwatkin, in The Valley of Bones and The Military Philosophers in the novel sequence A Dance to the Music of Time by Anthony Powell

== See also ==
- Watkin
- Watkins (disambiguation)
- Watkinson
