= Admiral Watkins =

Admiral Watkins may refer to:

- Frederick Watkins (Royal Navy officer) (1770–1856), active in the French Revolutionary and Napoleonic Wars
- James D. Watkins (1927–2012), U.S. Navy admiral who served as Chief of Naval Operations and Secretary of Energy
- John A. Watkins (admiral) (fl. 1990s–2020s), U.S. Navy rear admiral

== See also ==
- Watkins (surname)
