= Watcyn =

Watcyn is a Welsh masculine given name of Norman origin.

== People ==
People with the name Watcyn include:

=== As first name ===
- Watcyn Clywedog, 17th century Welsh poet
- Watcyn o Feirion (Watkin Jones, 1882–1967), Welsh postmaster and father of Elizabeth Watkin Jones
- Watcyn Samuel Jones (1877–1964), Welsh agriculturalist and educator
- Watcyn Thomas (1906–1977), Welsh rugby player
- Watcyn Wyn (1844–1905), Welsh schoolmaster and poet

=== As last name ===
- Damian Watcyn Lewis (born 1971), British actor, musician and producer
- David Watcyn Morgan (1859–1940), Welsh clergyman

== See also ==
- Watkin
