= Dutch leaf-toed gecko =

Conservation status
- Least Concern (IUCN 3.1)

Scientific classification
- Kingdom: Animalia
- Phylum: Chordata
- Class: Reptilia
- Order: Squamata
- Suborder: Gekkota
- Family: Phyllodactylidae
- Genus: Phyllodactylus
- Species: P. martini

Binomial name
- Phyllodactylus martini Lidth de Jeude, 1887

Species of lizard

The Dutch leaf-toed gecko (Phyllodactylus martini) is a species of lizard in the family Phyllodactylidae. The species is endemic to the Dutch Caribbean islands of Curaçao, Bonaire and Klein Bonaire.

== Taxonomy and etymology ==
The first description of the species was published by Theodorus Willem van Lidth de Jeude in 1887.</ref> The holotype was collected by Karl Martin in 1885, with the type locality being Curaçao. The specific name, martini, is in honor of German geologist Johann Karl Ludwig Martin.<ref>Beolens, Bo; Watkins, Michael; Grayson, Michael (2011). The Eponym Dictionary of Reptiles. Baltimore: Johns Hopkins University Press. xiii + 296 pp. ISBN 978-1-4214-0135-5. (Phyllodactylus martini, p. 170).

== Description and behaviour ==
The snout–vent length of the gecko varies between 21–54 mm (0.83–2.13 in). It has two postmental scales and 12–18 interorbital scales. Its back is greyish brown to fawn, with 5–7 bands across alternating between light and dark brown. The head is the same colour as the back, with a dark brown stripe going from shoulder to shoulder via the nostrils and eyes. The belly is white to grey and covered in many black dots.

The gecko is oviparous and nocturnal.

== Distribution and habitat ==
Phyllodactylus martini is endemic to the islands of Curaçao, Bonaire and Klein Bonaire, all three part of the Dutch Caribbean and the lattermost being an uninhabited satellite island of Bonaire.

The natural habitats of Phyllodactylus martini are forest and shrubland, but they are often seen on buildings, although not as frequently as in the past, as the Dutch leaf-toed gecko is subjected to competitive exclusion by the introduced Hemidactylus mabouia.
