= Andrew Brook =

Canadian philosopher, author and academic (born 1943)

- Born: 17 March 1943 (age 83); Edmonton, Alberta, Canada
- Spouse: Christine Koggel
- Children: 2 boys

Education
- Education: The Queen's College, Oxford (Rhodes Scholar), University of Alberta

Philosophical work
- Institutions: Carleton University
- Main interests: Immanuel Kant

Andrew Brook (born 17 March 1943) is a Canadian philosopher, author and academic particularly known for his writings on Immanuel Kant and the interplay between philosophy and cognitive science. Brook is Chancellor's Professor Emeritus of Philosophy and Cognitive Science at Carleton University, former President of the Canadian Psychoanalytic Society, and former President of the Canadian Philosophical Association.

== Biography ==
Brook was born in Edmonton, Alberta and received a BA in 1965 and a MA in 1966 from the University of Alberta. He then attended The Queen's College, Oxford as a Rhodes Scholar, receiving a D. Phil from Oxford in 1973 with a dissertation On Self-Consciousness and Self-Reference supervised by Anthony Kenny. He then joined the faculty of Carleton University, eventually becoming Director of the Institute of Cognitive Science and Chancellor's Professor of Philosophy and Cognitive Science. His first book, Kant and the Mind was published by Cambridge University Press in 1994. He subsequently co-authored Knowledge and Mind with Robert Stainton (MIT Press, 2000) and has edited several books on consciousness and cognitive science.

His work has primarily focused on Kant, theories of consciousness, and the relationship between philosophy and cognitive science, and also includes environmental ethics and psychoanalytic theory. He was elected President of the Canadian Psychoanalytic Society in 2013 and won the society's Douglas Levin Prize in 1991 and Miguel Prados Prize in 1994. He has been a Carnegie Mellon Fellow at Bryn Mawr College and a visiting professor in that college's Environmental Studies Program. Brook is married to Christine Koggel, Professor of Philosophy at Carleton University and former Harvey Wexler Professor of Philosophy at Bryn Mawr College. The couple have two sons.

== Writings ==
=== Kant and the Mind ===
Kant and the Mind was first published in 1994 by Cambridge University Press: in 1996 a paperback edition appeared. As Brook notes in the preface, Kant and the Mind was written for two audiences. First, cognitive scientists, philosophers of mind, and students of cognition. Second, Kant scholars. The book thus has two parts: the first four chapters provide an overview of Kant's model of the mind for general audiences. The second part, written primarily for Kant scholars, attempts to justify the reading given in the first four chapters. Brook emphasizes in the book that Kant had something to offer contemporary psychology, cognitive science and philosophy of mind, he writes, "I think that the discoveries he made about the mind not only were a contribution in their time, but continue to be important now." Brook attributes the following discoveries to Kant: 1) the mind has the ability to synthesize a single coherent representation of self and the world. 2) The mind has a unity that is necessary to produce representation. 3) The mind's awareness of itself has unique features stemming from the semantic apparatus that it uses to achieve this awareness. He also suggests that three of Kant's insights have been adopted by cognitive science: the transcendental method (inference to the best explanation), that experience requires both concepts and percepts; and his general picture of the mind as a system of concept-using functions for manipulating representations. He explains that Kant distrusted introspection as a means of revealing the structure of the mind, yet also had deep reservations about Cartesian a priori arguments. The theory of mind that Brook finds in Kant is not based on either approach, but instead explores what powers the mind must have in order to have experiences and representations that it has.

Brook distinguishes four kinds of awareness, two of which are also kinds of self-awareness: simple awareness (awareness of an object without being aware of being aware), awareness with recognition, awareness of one's representational states and awareness of oneself as the subject of one's representational states. He divides the latter into empirical self-awareness (being aware of one's own mental states) and apperceptive self-awareness (ASA) (being aware of oneself as the subject of those states). ASA is not awareness of oneself as an object with properties; rather, ASA is a bald reference to oneself as existing as oneself. One need not ascribe to oneself any properties whatsoever. If Brook's reading of Kant is correct, then Kant discovered ASA 200 years before contemporary theories.

In addition to these distinctions, Brook writes that Kant thought the mind is not merely the subject that has representations, but is itself a representation. ("The mind, the self, the understanding, the thing that thinks not only has representations; it is a representation.") Not only is the mind a representation under this reading, but it is what Brook calls a global representation (the result of synthesis of a multitude of representations into a single intentional object). Brook argues that treating the mind as a global representation removes any risk of a homunculus problem (Hogan, 1996), and further argues that this global representation is the representational base for ASA.

Reviewing the book, Stevenson wrote in The Philosophical Quarterly, "I venture the judgement that this will be recognized as one of the most important books ever on Kant." However, Eric Watkins in the Journal of the History of Philosophy raised concerns about the literature Brook cited and the more controversial interpretations: "Brook neglects almost entirely the relevant German scholarship on Kant's theory of mind, in the form of work by G. Prauss, W. Carl, M. Frank, G. Mohr, B. Thole and D. Sturma" (Watkins, 1995, p. 3). Watkins further criticizes Brook's claims that one can be aware of the mind as it is and that the mind is a global representation, since the latter directly conflicts with Kant's view that the noumenal self is immaterial, not a representation.

=== Knowledge and Mind ===
Knowledge and Mind is an introductory text treating both epistemology and philosophy of mind l. Robert Stainton and Brook co-authored the book which was published in 2000. Divided into three parts, the first part discusses scepticism, knowledge of the external world and knowledge of language. The second part focuses on the metaphysics of mind, as well as free-will. The third discusses knowledge of mind, naturalism and how epistemology and philosophy of mind should resonate in cognitive science.

=== Other authored or edited publications ===
In addition to numerous scholarly papers, Brook's other publications include:

- Dennett's Philosophy: A comprehensive assessment, ed. with D. Ross and D. Thompson (MIT Press, 2000)
- Self-reference and Self-awareness, edited with Richard C DeVidi (Benjamins, 2001)
- Daniel Dennett (in the series, Contemporary Philosophy in Focus), ed. with Don Ross (Cambridge University Press, 2002)
- Cognition and the Brain: The Philosophy and Neuroscience Movement, ed. with Kathleen Akins (Cambridge University Press, 2005)
- The Prehistory of Cognitive Science (Palgrave Macmillan, 2007)

He has also written the following encyclopedia entries:

- "Kant's View on the Mind and Consciousness of Self" in Stanford Encyclopedia of Philosophy
- "Unity of Consciousness" (with Paul Raymont) in Stanford Encyclopedia of Philosophy
- "Daniel Clements Dennett" in Encyclopedia of Philosophy, 2nd edition. Macmillan
- "Kant" in F. Keil and R. Wilson, eds. MIT Encyclopaedia of the Cognitive Sciences. MIT Press
