= Wadkins =

Wadkins is a surname. Notable people with the surname include:

- Bobby Wadkins (born 1951), American golfer, brother of Lanny
- Lanny Wadkins (born 1949), American golfer

== See also ==
- Watkins (surname)
