= Sammy Watkins (disambiguation) =

Sammy Watkins may refer to:

- Sammy Watkins (born 1993), American football player
- Sammy Watkins (musician), American musician

== See also ==
- Samuel R. Watkins (1839–1901), American writer and humorist
