= Frederick Watkins =

Frederick or Fred Watkins may refer to:

- Frederick Watkins (Royal Navy officer) (1770–1856), British Royal Navy admiral
- Frederick Watkins (priest) (1808–1888), English Anglican clergyman, friend of Charles Darwin
- Fred Watkins (footballer) (1878–1957), Welsh footballer
- Fred Watkins (politician) (1883–1954), British trade unionist and Member of Parliament for Hackney Central
