= Eric Watkins =

Eric Watkins may refer to:

- Eric Watkins (rugby), (1880 - 1949), New Zealand rugby footballer
- Eric Watkins (philosopher), American philosopher
