= Karl Martin =

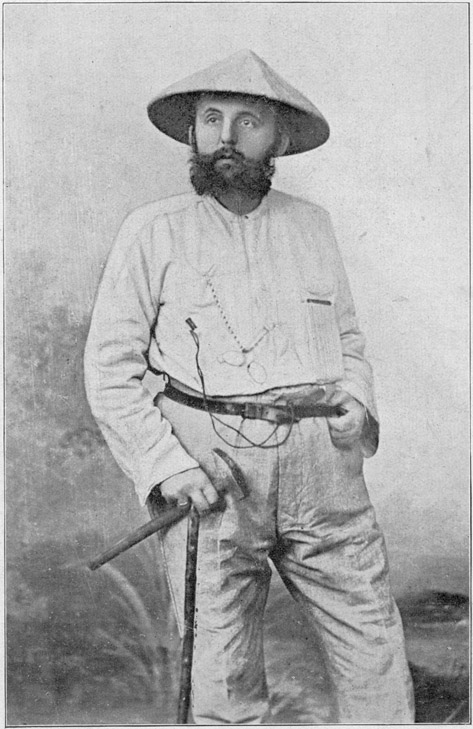
Karl Martin during the Moluccas expedition of 1892

Johann Karl Ludwig Martin (24 November 1851, Jever (Ostfriesland) – 14 November 1942, Leiden) was a German geologist. He was professor in geology at Leiden University from 1877 to 1922. From 1880 to 1922 he also was director of the Geological Museum of Leiden. As a scientist he is known for his paleontological and stratigraphical research on the Cenozoic fauna of the Dutch East Indies, especially on mollusks.

Karl Martin was student at Göttingen, where he became PhD in 1874. He then worked as a teacher at Wismar, where he studied the glacial deposits of Northern Europe. He visited the Museum of Natural History at Leiden to see the collection of Winand Staring, thus meeting the zoologist Hermann Schlegel, the director of the museum. When a chair in geology was created at Leiden University in 1877, Schlegel remembered Martin as a good candidate.

As a professor at Leiden, Martins' research was on the collections of the (in 1880 newly created) Geological Museum, especially on fossils from the Dutch colonies. As director of the museum, he enlarged the collections by new purchases and participating in expeditions to the Dutch colonies: in 1884 to the Dutch Antilles, in 1892 to the Moluccas and in 1910 to Java. After his retirement in 1922 Martin continued his research on the Tertiary stratigraphy of the Dutch East Indies. His successor at Leiden University was B.G. Escher. Among his students were G.A.F. Molengraaff, J.H.F. Umbgrove, L.U. de Sitter and Ph.H. Kuenen.

Martin is commemorated in the scientific name of a species of gecko, Phyllodactylus martini. and also in the Martin & Temminck Fellowship of Naturalis Biodiversity Center in Leiden, a grant set up in 2007 by science director Menno Schilthuizen and awarded to young visiting scholars to the museum.

== Sources ==
- Leidsche Geologische Mededeelingen deel V, 1931, titled Feestbundel uitgegeven ter eere van prof. dr. K. Martin
- G.E. de Groot, 1978: Rijksmuseum van Geologie en Mineralogie 1878-1978, Scripta Geologica, Vol. 48 p. 3-25 PDF
- Hoek Oostende L.W. van den, J. Leloux, F.P. Wesselingh, C.F. Winkler Prins (2002) Cenozoic Molluscan types from Java (Indonesia) in the Martin Collection (Division of Cenozoic Mollusca), National Museum of Natural History, Leiden NNM Technical Bulletin 5 p. 1-130 PDF
- Leloux J., F.P. Wesselingh (2009)Types of Cenozoic Mollusca from Java in the Martin Collection of Naturalis, NNM Technical Bulletin 11 p. 1-765 PDF
- A.J. Pannekoek, 1962: Geological research at the universities of The Netherlands, 1877-1962 in Geologie & Mijnbouw, vol. 41 no. 4 p. 161-174
- C.F. Winkler Prins, 2004, Geological collections of the Nationaal Natuurhistorisch Museum (Leiden, The Netherlands): cultural heritage of the geosciences and mining, Scripta Geologica Special Issue 4, p. 293-307 PDF
