= David Watkins =

David Watkins may refer to:

- David Watkins (Australian politician) (1865–1935), member of the Australian House of Representatives 1901–1935
- David Oliver Watkins (1896–1971), member of the Australian House of Representatives from 1935 to 1958, son of the above member
- David Watkins (rugby) (1942–2023), Welsh dual-code rugby international
- David Watkins (British politician) (1925–2013), British Labour politician, MP for Consett until 1983
- David Ogden Watkins (1862–1938), acting governor of New Jersey, 1898–1899
- David Watkins (designer) (graduated 1963), British designer
- David Watkins (cricketer) (born 1928), former English cricketer
- Dave Watkins (baseball) (born 1944), former Major League Baseball player
- Dave Watkins (cyclist), English cyclist
- David Watkins (Kentucky politician) (born 1943)
- David Watkins, figure in the White House travel office controversy under U.S. President Bill Clinton
- David Watkins (special effects artist), British special effects artist

== See also ==
- David Watkin (disambiguation)
