= Ernest Watkins (disambiguation) =

Ernest Watkins (1902–1982) was a provincial politician and author from Alberta, Canada.

Ernest Watkins may also refer to:

- Ernie Watkins (footballer, born 1898) (1898–1976), English footballer
- Ernest Watkins (footballer, born 1878) (1878–1957), Welsh international footballer
