= Watkins =

Watkins may refer to:

== Boats ==
- Watkins Yachts, an American sailboat builder, in business from 1973–1989
  - Watkins 32, an American sailboat design
  - Watkins 33, an American sailboat design

== Places ==
In the United States:

- Watkins, Colorado
- Watkins, Iowa
- Watkins, Minnesota
- Watkins, Missouri
- Watkins, Ohio
- Watkins, West Virginia
- Watkins Glen, New York

== Organisations ==
- Watkins Incorporated, a manufacturer of cosmetics, health remedies and baking products
- Watkins Electric Music, a manufacturer of musical instruments
- Watkins Books, a mind-body-spirit bookshop

== People ==
- Watkins (surname)

== Other ==
- Watkins v. United States (1975), a U.S. Supreme Court decision
- Watkins Biographical Dictionary, a biographical dictionary
