= James Watkins =

James, Jim or Jimmy Watkins may refer to:

- James Watkins (abolitionist) (born c. 1823), American abolitionist and autobiographer
- James K. Watkins (1887–1970), American football player and police commissioner
- James D. Watkins (1927–2012), United States admiral and Secretary of Energy
- Julian Christopher or James or Jim Watkins (1944–2023), American actor
- James C. Watkins (born 1951), ceramic artist
- Jim Watkins (darts player) (born 1954), American darts player
- Jim Watkins (news anchor) (born 1956), former news anchor
- Jim Watkins (businessman) (born 1963), operator of 8chan and 2channel
- James Watkins (director) (born 1973), English film director and screenwriter
- Jimmy Watkins (cyclist) (born 1982), American cyclist
- Jimmy Watkins (runner) (born 1982), British runner
- James Watkins (researcher) (fl. 1970s–2010s), biomechanics and sports science researcher
