= Paul Watkins =

Paul Watkins may refer to:

- Paul Watkins (musician) (born 1970), Welsh cellist and conductor
- Paul Watkins (novelist) (born 1964), American author
- Paul Watkins (Manson Family) (1950–1990), member of Charles Manson's "Family"
- Paul B. Watkins (born 1953), American physician, hepatologist, and pharmacologist
