= Watkin =

Watkin is an English surname formed as a diminutive of the name Watt (also Wat), a popular Middle English given name itself derived as a pet form of the name Walter. First found in a small Welsh village in 1629.

Within the United Kingdom it is associated with being a Welsh surname.

It may refer to:

People

- Arthur Watkin, English footballer
- Billy Watkin, English footballer
- Cyril Watkin, English footballer
- Edward Watkin, Victorian railway chairman
  - Edward Watkin (disambiguation)
- Evan Watkin, New Zealand cricket umpire
- Frank Watkin, English footballer
- George Watkin, English footballer
- Louise Watkin, British paralympic swimmer
- Pierre Watkin, an American actor
- Steve Watkin, English cricketer
- Steve Watkin (footballer), Welsh footballer
- Thomas Glyn Watkin, Welsh lawyer
- Watkin Tench, British marine officer in Australia's First Fleet
- Watkin Tudor Jones, also known as Ninja, South African rapper
- Sir Watkin Williams-Wynn, 6th Baronet, Welsh politician
- William Thompson Watkin (1836–1888), English archaeologist
- William Ward Watkin, American architect

== See also ==
- Watkin Baronets
- Watkins (surname)
- Watcyn
- Atkin (disambiguation), Atkins (surname)
- Atkinson (surname)
