= Jack Watkins =

Jack Watkins may refer to:

- Jack Watkins (Australian rules footballer) (born 2000), Australian rules footballer
- Jack Watkins (basketball) (1923–1998), American basketball player
- Jack Watkins (rugby league) (1893–1974), Australian rugby league footballer

== See also ==
- John Watkins (disambiguation)
