= John Watkins =

John Watkins may refer to:

== Politicians ==
- John Watkins (mayor) (died 1812), mayor of New Orleans
- John D. Watkins (1828–1895), American politician in Louisiana
- John T. Watkins (1854–1925), American politician, U.S. Representative from Louisiana
- John Watkins (Virginia politician, born 1947), Virginia state senator
- John Watkins (Australian politician) (born 1955), in New South Wales
- John A. Watkins (politician) (1898–1973), politician from the U.S. state of Indiana
- John B. Watkins (1855–1931), politician in the Virginia Senate
- John Lloyd Vaughan Watkins, Welsh politician

== Sportsmen ==
- John Watkins (baseball) (1857–1924), American pre-Negro leagues baseball catcher and manager
- John Watkins (South African cricketer) (1923–2021), South African cricketer
- John Watkins (Australian cricketer) (born 1943), Australian cricketer
- John Watkins (rugby union) (born 1945), English rugby union player

== Others ==
- John Watkins (architect) (1834–1902), architect in Utah
- John W. N. Watkins (1924–1999), English philosopher
- John Watkins (diplomat) (1902–1964), Canadian diplomat and ambassador
- John Watkins (photographer) (1823–1874), English portrait photographer
- John Watkins (writer) (fl. 1792–1831), English writer known as a biographer
- John A. Watkins (admiral), United States Navy admiral
- John G. Watkins (1913–2012), American psychologist
- J. Elfreth Watkins (1852–1903), curator at the United States National Museum
- John M. Watkins, founder of Watkins Books
- J. S. Watkins (John Samuel Watkins, 1866–1942), Australian art teacher

== See also ==
- Jack Watkins (1893–1974), Australian rugby league footballer
- Jonathan Watkins (born 1957), English curator
- Watkins v. United States, U.S. Supreme Court decision (1957)
