= David Watkin =

David Watkin may refer to:

- David Watkin (cinematographer) (1925–2008), British cinematographer
- David Watkin (historian) (1941–2018), Cambridge architectural historian

== See also ==
- David Watkins (disambiguation)
