= Thomas Watkin =

Thomas Watkin may refer to:

- Thomas Glyn Watkin (born 1952), Welsh lawyer
- Thomas Joseph-Watkin (1856–1915), barrister and officer of arms at the College of Arms

== See also ==
- Thomas Watkins (disambiguation)
