= Michael Watkins =

Michael or Mike Watkins may refer to:

- Michael D. Watkins, American author
- Michael M. Watkins, American engineer and scientist
- Michael W. Watkins, American television producer
- Michael Watkins (zoologist), British zoologist and author
- Mike Watkins (rugby union) (1952–2025), Welsh rugby union player
- Mike Watkins (basketball) (born 1995), American basketball player

== See also ==
- Mike Watkin (born 1943), English speedway rider
