= Watkinson =

Watkinson is a surname of English origin. At the time of the British Census of 1881 Watkinson Surname at Forebears, its frequency was highest in Nottinghamshire (4.1 times the British average), followed by Cambridgeshire, Derbyshire, Yorkshire, Lancashire, Suffolk, Lincolnshire, Essex and Cheshire. The name Watkinson may apply to:

== Surname ==
- Angela Watkinson (born 1941), British politician
- Carolyn Watkinson (born 1949), British baroque singer
- Colin Watkinson, British cinematographer
- David Watkinson (born 1954), British rugby league player
- Dr. Ernest A. Watkinson (1912–2011), Canadian physician, diplomat, and public health advocate
- Eddie Watkinson (born 1979), American artist
- Harold Watkinson (1910–1995), British businessman and politician, the only Viscount Watkinson
- Lee Watkinson (born 1966), American poker player
- Murray Watkinson (1939–2004), New Zealand rower, brother of Peter Watkinson
- Mike Watkinson (born 1961), English cricketer
- Peter Watkinson, New Zealand rower, brother of Murray Watkinson
- Robert Watkinson (1579–1602), British catholic priest and martyr
- Thomas Watkinson (Died in 1591), British catholic martyr
- William Watkinson "Billy" (1922–2001), English footballer
- William Watkinson (jockey) "Willie" (1886–1926), Tasmanian jockey, winning rider of Jack Horner at the 1926 Grand National

== See also ==
- Watkins (surname)
