= Frank Watkins =

Frank Watkins may refer to:

- Frank Watkins (musician) (1968–2015), American heavy metal musician
- Frank Watkins (pilot) (1922–1942), officer of the Royal New Zealand Air Force during the Second World War
