= Harry Watkins =

Harry Watkins may refer to:

- Harry Evans Watkins (1898–1963), United States federal judge
- Harry Vaughan Watkins (1875–1945), Welsh international rugby union player
- Harry Watkins (actor) (1825–1894), American actor

== See also ==
- Henry Watkins (disambiguation)
