= James Watkins (researcher) =

British researcher

James Watkins is Professor of Biomechanics in the College of Engineering at Swansea University, Swansea, Wales UK (2002–2014). During the period 2000–2009, he was Head of the Department of Sports Science and Director of the Sport and Exercise Science Research Centre. Watkins was formerly at Jordanhill College, Glasgow, Scotland, UK (1974–1993) and at the University of Strathclyde, Glasgow, Scotland, UK (1993–2000). He is an advisory board member of the Journal of Sports Sciences.

He was chairman of the biomechanics section of the British Association of Sport and Exercise Sciences from 1993 to 1996 and a member of the sports-related subjects panel in the 1996 and 2001 Research Assessment Exercises.

He is a fellow of the Higher Education Academy (FHEA), a fellow of the British Association of Sport and Exercise Sciences (FBASES), a fellow of the Physical Education Association of the United Kingdom (FPEAUK) and an honorary member of the Association for Physical Education (afPE).

== Books ==
- James Watkins (1983). An Introduction to Mechanics of Human Movement. Lancaster: MTP Press. ISBN 0-85200-975-5.
- James Watkins (1999). Structure and Function of the Musculoskeletal System. Human Kinetics. ISBN 0-88011-686-2.
- James Watkins (2007). An Introduction to Biomechanics of Sport and Exercise. Edinburgh: Churchill Livingstone. ISBN 978-0-443-10282-0.
- James Watkins (2009). Functional Anatomy. Edinburgh: Churchill Livingstone. ISBN 978-0702030321.
- James Watkins (2010). Structure and Function of the Musculoskeletal System (2nd ed.). Champaign, Illinois: Human Kinetics. ISBN 978-0736078900.
- James Watkins (2014). Fundamental Biomechanics of Sport and Exercise. London: Routledge. ISBN 978-0415815086.
