= Henry Watkins =

Henry Watkins may refer to:

- Henry Watkins (diplomat) (1666-1727), MP for Brackley, Northants.
- Henry Watkins (priest) (1844–1922), Anglican priest, academic and author
- Henry Hitt Watkins (1866–1947), United States federal judge
- Gino Watkins (Henry George Watkins, 1907–1932), Arctic explorer
- Henry Watkins, a character in the 1981 film Amy

== See also ==
- Harry Watkins (disambiguation)
- Henry Watkin (1824–1910), English printer
- Henry Watkins Allen (1820–1866), American soldier and politician
