= Maurice Watkins =

Maurice Watkins may refer to:

- Maurice Watkins (boxer) (born 1956), boxer from Houston, Texas
- Maurice Watkins (solicitor) (1941–2021), British solicitor and sports administrator
