= Susan Watkins =

American painter (1875–1913)

Susan Watkins Susan Watkins
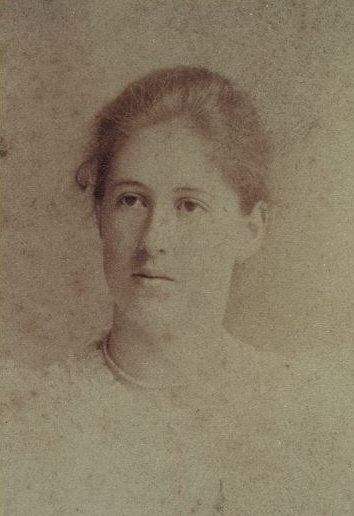
- Susan Watkins, c. 1900
- Born: June 5, 1875; Lake County, California
- Died: June 18, 1913 (aged 38); Baltimore, Maryland
- Education: E.L. Murison School, Gibbons School, Art Students League of New York, Académie Julian
- Known for: Portrait painting, landscapes
- Spouse: Goldsborough Serpell

Susan Watkins (June 5, 1875 – June 18, 1913) was an American artist, known for painting in the styles of realism and impressionism. She studied under William Merritt Chase and Raphaël Collin. Two of her pieces are on permanent display at the Chrysler Museum of Art in Norfolk, Virginia.

== Early life ==
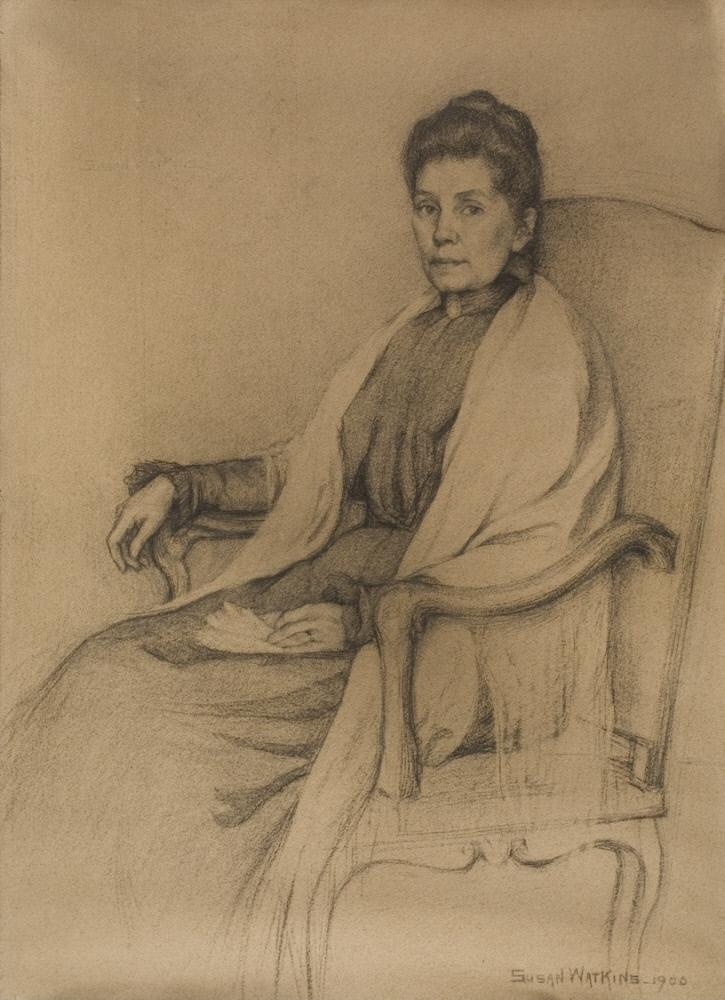
Mrs. Watkins, 1900. A crayon sketch Susan Watkins drew of her mother, Susan Ella Owens Watkins

Susan Watkins was born on June 5, 1875, in Lake County, California to the prominent and wealthy San Francisco family of Susan Ella Owens and James Thomas Watkins. Her father was a California newspaper editor. Her grandfather, Commodore James T. Watkins, was a trans-Pacific ship captain. He was regarded as a hero for saving the passengers and crew of a ship caught in a storm en route from San Francisco to New York. John Greenleaf Whittier wrote a poem about this heroic act titled "The Three Bells". She had two siblings- a brother, James and a sister, Eleanor Watkins Reeves (the subject of her later work Lady in Yellow, and wife of Joseph Mason Reeves).

Watkins attended E. L. Murison School in California and later, Gibbons School in New York City. At age 15 she moved to New York City, where her father began work as an editor for The New York Sun. While in New York from 1890 - 1896 she studied at the Art Students League of New York and was taught by William Merritt Chase. Chase once referred to her as "the best woman painter living".

After Watkins's father died in 1896, she and her mother moved to Paris, and her mother encouraged her to pursue her interest in painting. She was likely drawn to France to continue her studies because the French government at the time supported artists in ways that the United States did not. In Paris, Watkins studied under Raphaël Collin at the Académie Julian for ten years, and was recognized as one of his finest students. Collin instructed his students on drawing, anatomy, and studies of the nude model with the ultimate goal of understanding and accurately depicting the human form. The Chrysler Museum of Art has numerous sketches - referred to as académies - drawn by Watkins during her time at the Académie, which demonstrate her comprehension of Collin's teachings.

== Career and honors ==
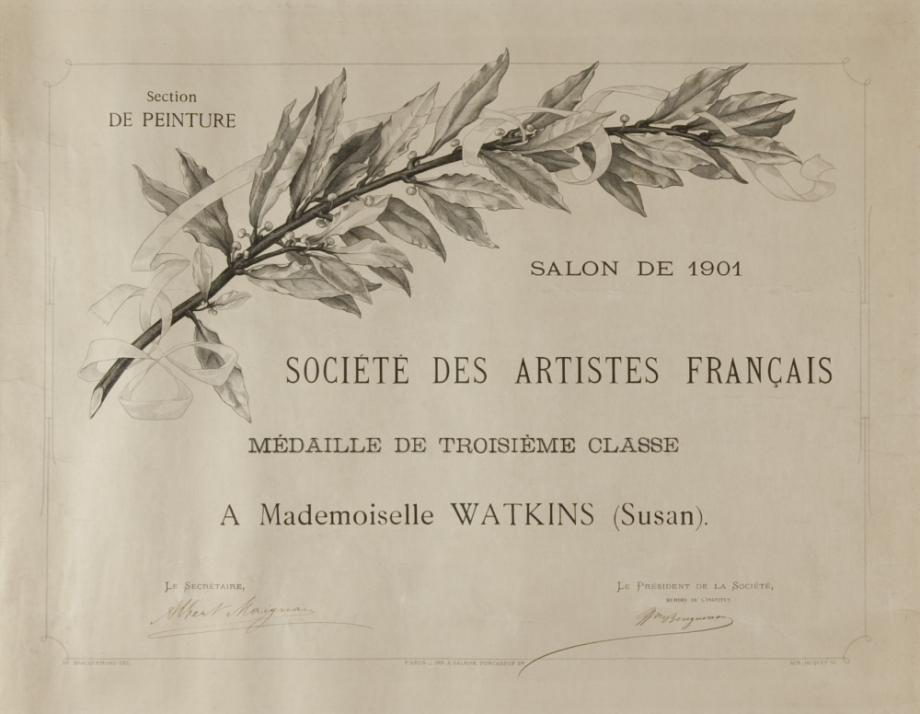
A Mademoiselle Watkins, 1901 Certificate of Honorable Mention from The Society of French Artists

- 1899 Honorary Mention, La Petite Hollandaise, Paris Salon
- 1901 Third-Class Gold Medal, The 1830 Girl, Paris Salon - the highest award given to American artists at the time
- 1901 Certificate of Honorable Mention from The Society of French Artists
- 1904 Silver Medal, Louisiana Purchase Exposition, St. Louis
- 1906 Exhibition at Alaska-Yukon Expo in Seattle
- 1910 Julia A. Shaw Memorial Prize for best painting or sculpture by an American woman, National Academy of Design, New York
- 1910 Exhibition at Vickery, Atkins & Torrey
- 1912 Associate Member, National Academy of Design
- 1912 Prize at the Carnegie Institute in Pittsburgh
- Exhibition at the Art Institute of Chicago
- Exhibition at the Corcoran Art Gallery, Washington, D.C.
- McMillin Prize, Woman's Art Club, New York City
- Exhibition at Mark Hopkins Institute of Art in San Francisco, now the San Francisco Art Institute
- 1985 Exhibition at the Chrysler Museum of Art, "Between Continents and Centuries: Susan Watkins, An American Artist Rediscovered"
- 2003 Exhibition at the Chrysler Museum of Art, "Gentle Modernist: The Art of Susan Watkins"

== Style and subject matter ==
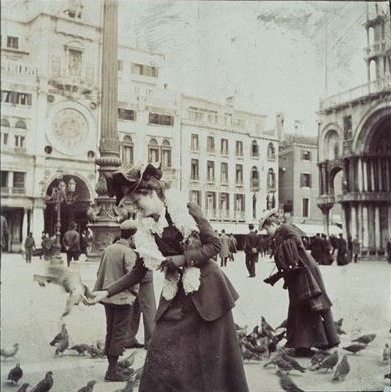
Susan Watkins feeding pigeons in San Marco (ca. 1891-1904).

The majority of Watkins's paintings are of landscapes, portraits, and interiors and primarily oil paintings on canvas or board. Her earlier works lean towards realism - with dark tones and clear details, while her later works are more colorful and Impressionist in style. Her early, dark-toned paintings are evocative of 17th century Dutch paintings. She was likely influenced by differing art styles while working in the United States and later, in Europe. In 1906, Watkins visited Italy with suitor, Goldsborough Serpell with destinations including Capri, an island near Naples. She painted a series of colorful Impressionist paintings featuring young local boys picking grapes on the island. Possibly her largest painting is "Marguerite" at approximately 79 x 37 inches (201 x 94 cm), painted in 1906. It is speculated that Marguerite was a maid that worked for Watkins while she lived in France. Along with numerous oil paintings, Watkins also created academic drawings and sketches. A Young Girl was the final portrait painted by Watkins - a portrait of Walter S. Martin's daughter.

== Personal life ==
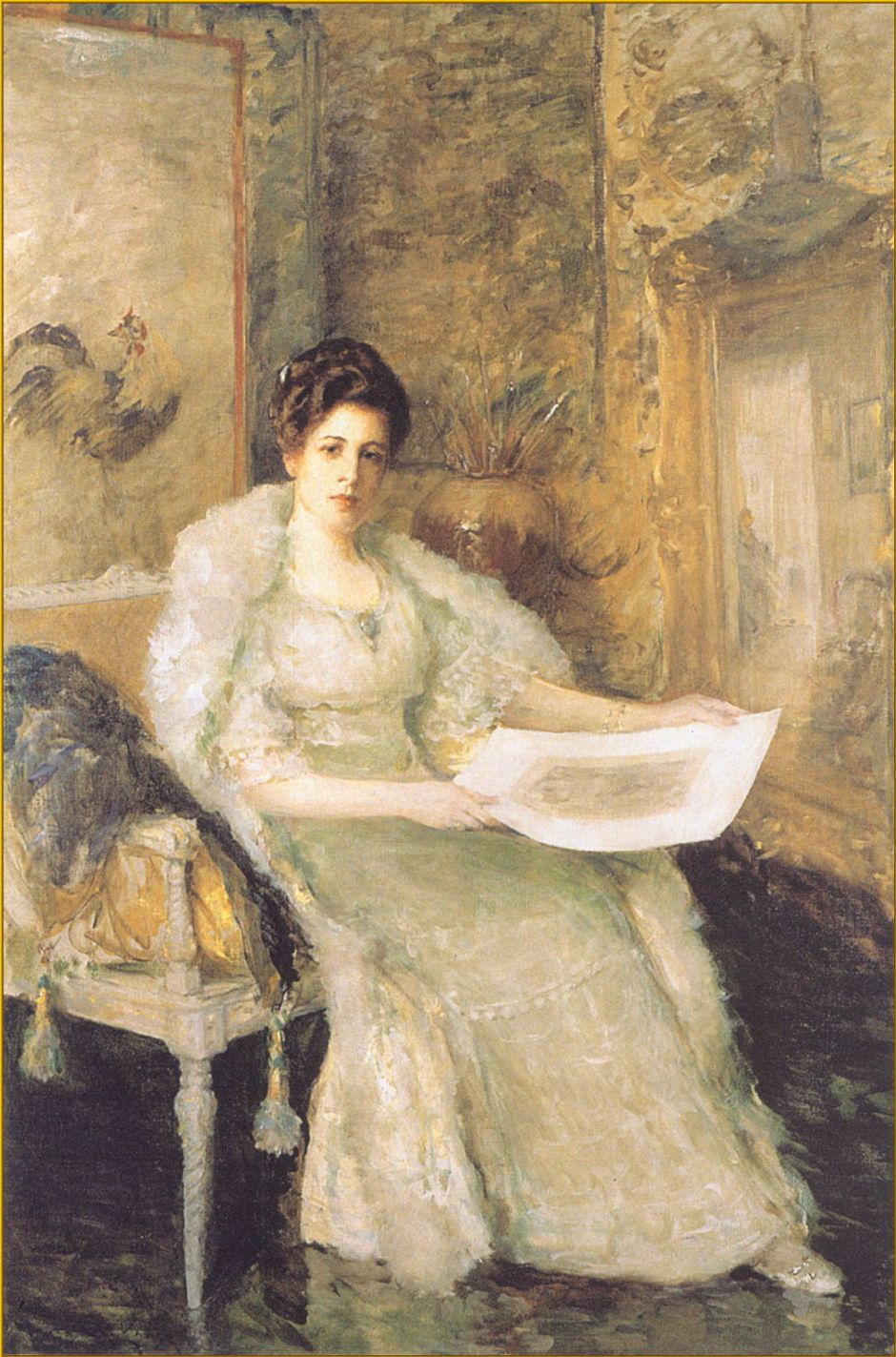
Susan Watkins, ca. 1914 by William Merritt Chase. Chase painted this large portrait after Watkins's death as a memorial to his former student and friend

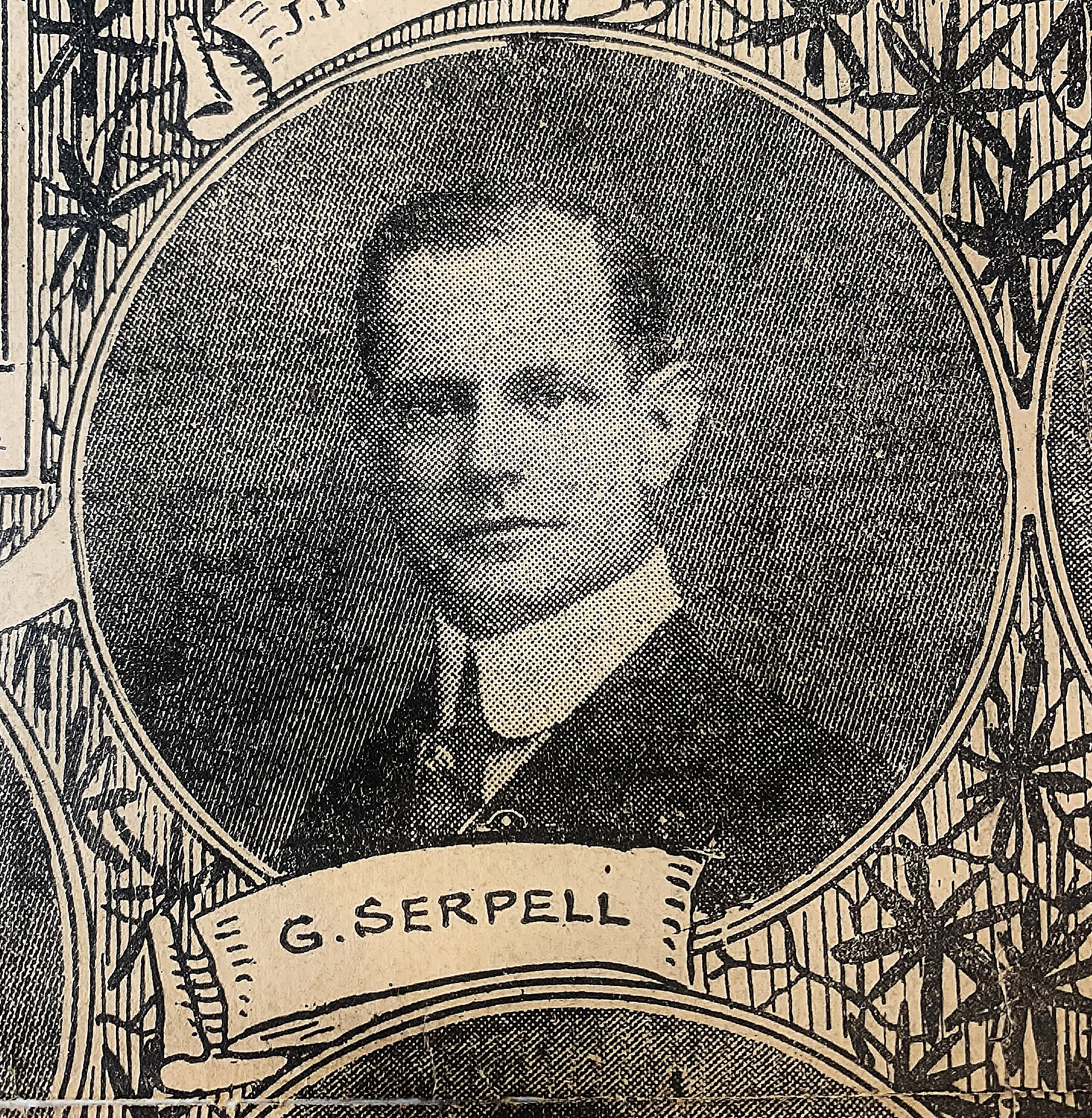
Goldsborough Serpell II, husband of Susan Watkins.

Watkins became ill while traveling in Europe, and returned to the United States in 1910. She married long-time suitor, Goldsborough Serpell II on January 16, 1912, in Norfolk, Virginia. Because Watkins was financially independent and encouraged by her mother not to marry, she was disinterested in marriage for many years. Despite her independent nature, she did not seem to be a supporter of women's suffrage. She is quoted saying "a woman who is really occupied with the real things of life is so busy accomplishing them that she hasn't any thought of such things".

Her husband, Goldsborough Serpell II was born in Connellsville, Pennsylvania. His father, Goldsborough McDowell Serpell I worked as a civil engineer for the Louisville & Nashville Railroad and the Baltimore & Ohio Railroad. Goldsborough Serpell I later founded the Tunis-Serpell Lumber Company and built the Norfolk & North Carolina Railroad to transport lumber. He served in Company B of the First Maryland Cavalry in the Civil War. Goldsborough II was a Norfolk banker, member of the Norfolk Executive Committee Southern Commercial Congress, board chairman of Seaboard Citizens National Bank, and president of the United Owners Realty Corporation in Norfolk. He graduated in 1895 from the Virginia Military Institute in Lexington, Virginia. He is mentioned as an usher in a 1902 volume of Town & Country (magazine). While married, the couple lived on Duke Street in Norfolk, Virginia. A 1910 census shows that her husband lived at 108 Duke Street, Norfolk, Virginia.

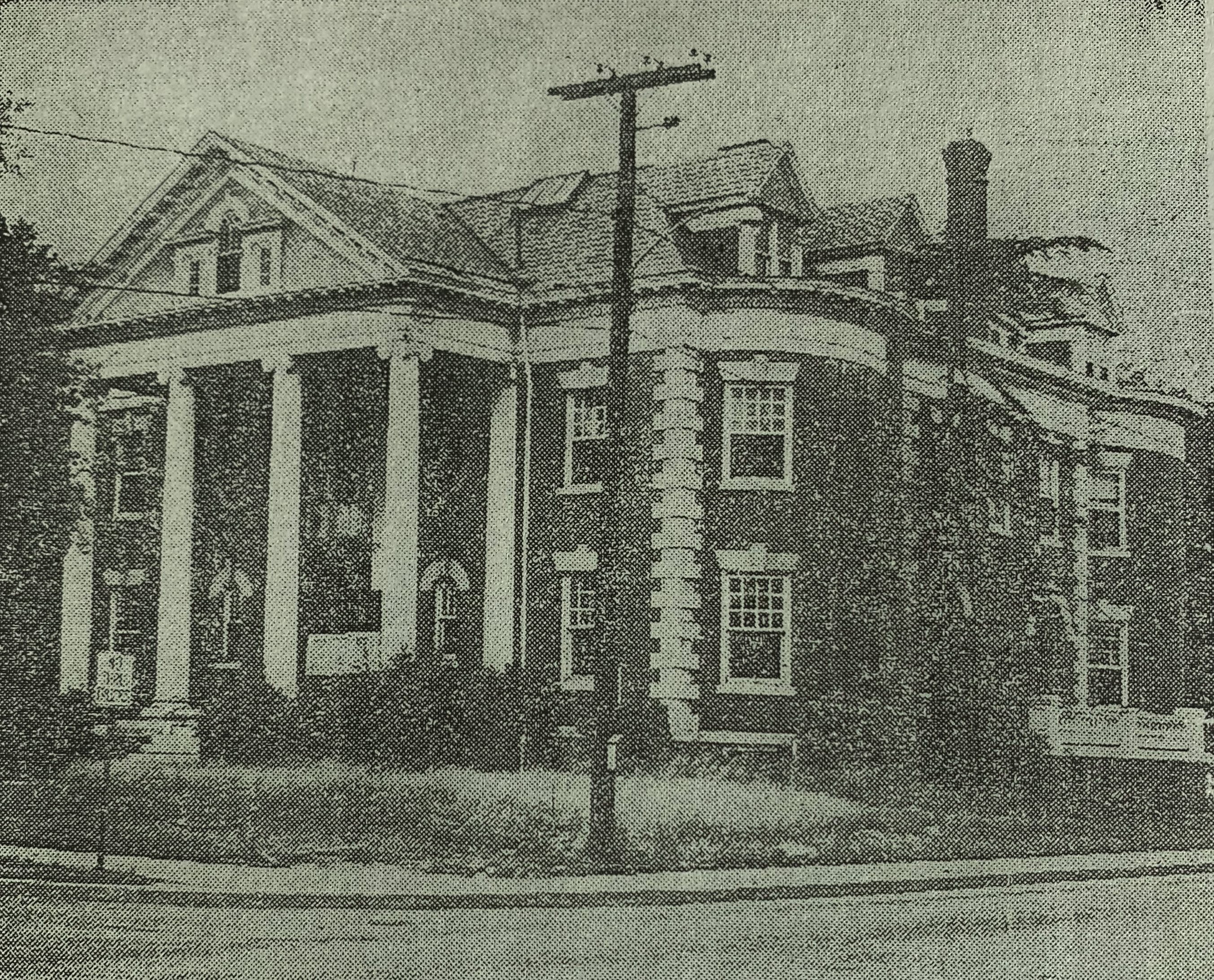
Serpell House in Norfolk, Virginia, at the corner of Hampton Boulevard and Westover Avenue. It was demolished after severe looting and replaced with a medical facility in the 1960s.

Susan Watkins Serpell died on June 18, 1913, in Johns Hopkins Hospital in Baltimore, Maryland. She was 38 years old. Her body was transported back to Norfolk, Virginia to be buried. It is not clear what illness afflicted Watkins, but sources speculate it was likely cancer. After her death, her husband lived at the Serpell family home at 902 Westover Avenue. The Serpell family home - called the Serpell House - was a three-story, 40 room residence built in 1907 on the corner of Hampton Boulevard and Westover Avenue. It was the first private residence in Norfolk to have an elevator. Serpell's father, Goldsborough McDowell Serpell I, hired butler William Hendricks, who served the household for over 70 years. Hendricks polished the family silver, served meals, maintained the lavish flower garden, decorated the house for the holidays, and chauffeured the family until his death.

Her husband died in 1946 at age 70, and left 62 of her paintings to the Norfolk Museum of Arts and Sciences - what is now the Chrysler Museum of Art. Watkins pieces that are not displayed or stored at the Chrysler Museum are in private collections. It is hypothesized that she would have become famous similar to the likes of Mary Cassatt, Cecilia Beaux, and Georgia O'Keeffe if not for her untimely death at the age of 38. She is seen as a pioneer in the fine art field in the 19th and 20th centuries, when women were not typically welcomed or awarded high praise in the community. She was Episcopalian. Watkins and Serpell are buried next to each other in Elmwood Cemetery in Norfolk, plot EXT 16-L8.

== Gallery ==
=== Realism ===
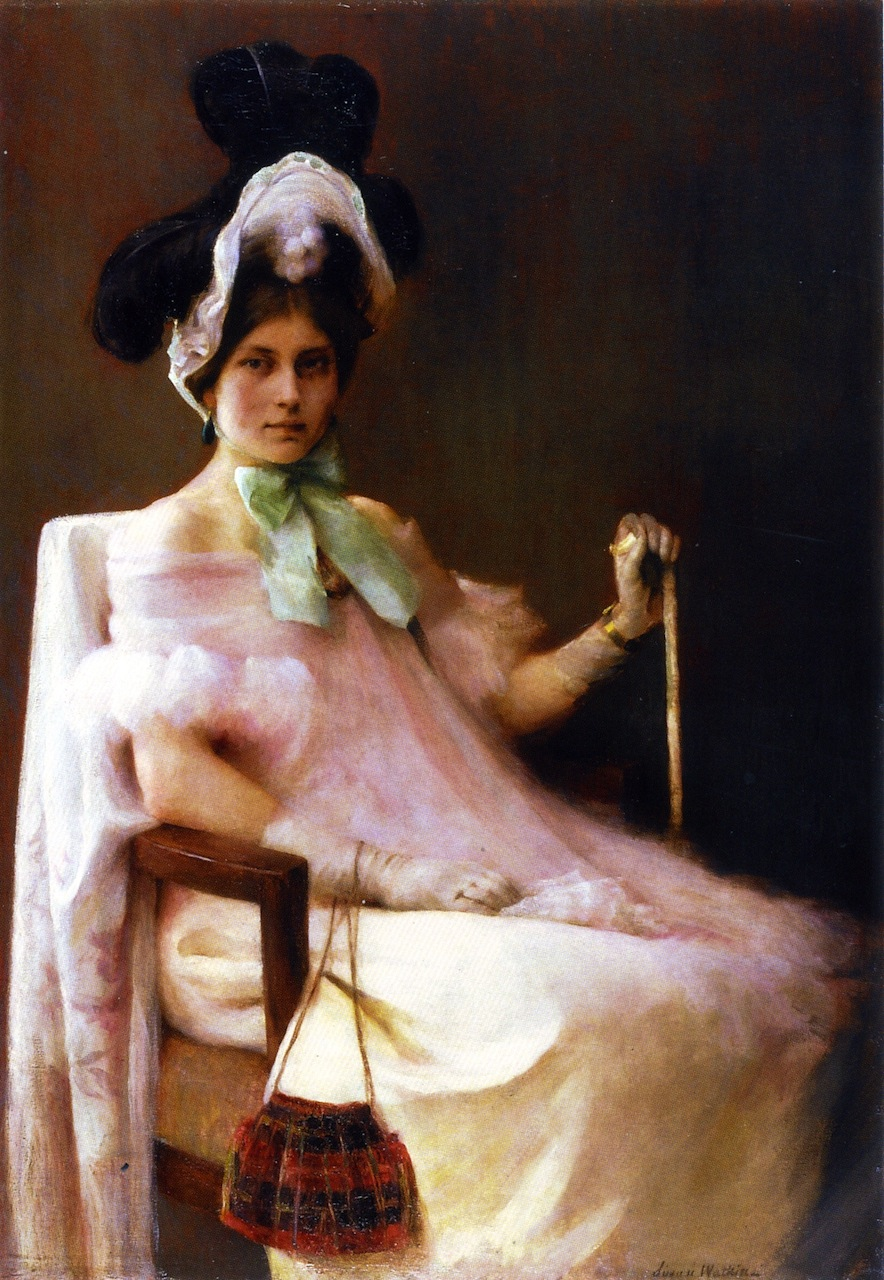
The 1830 Girl, 1900

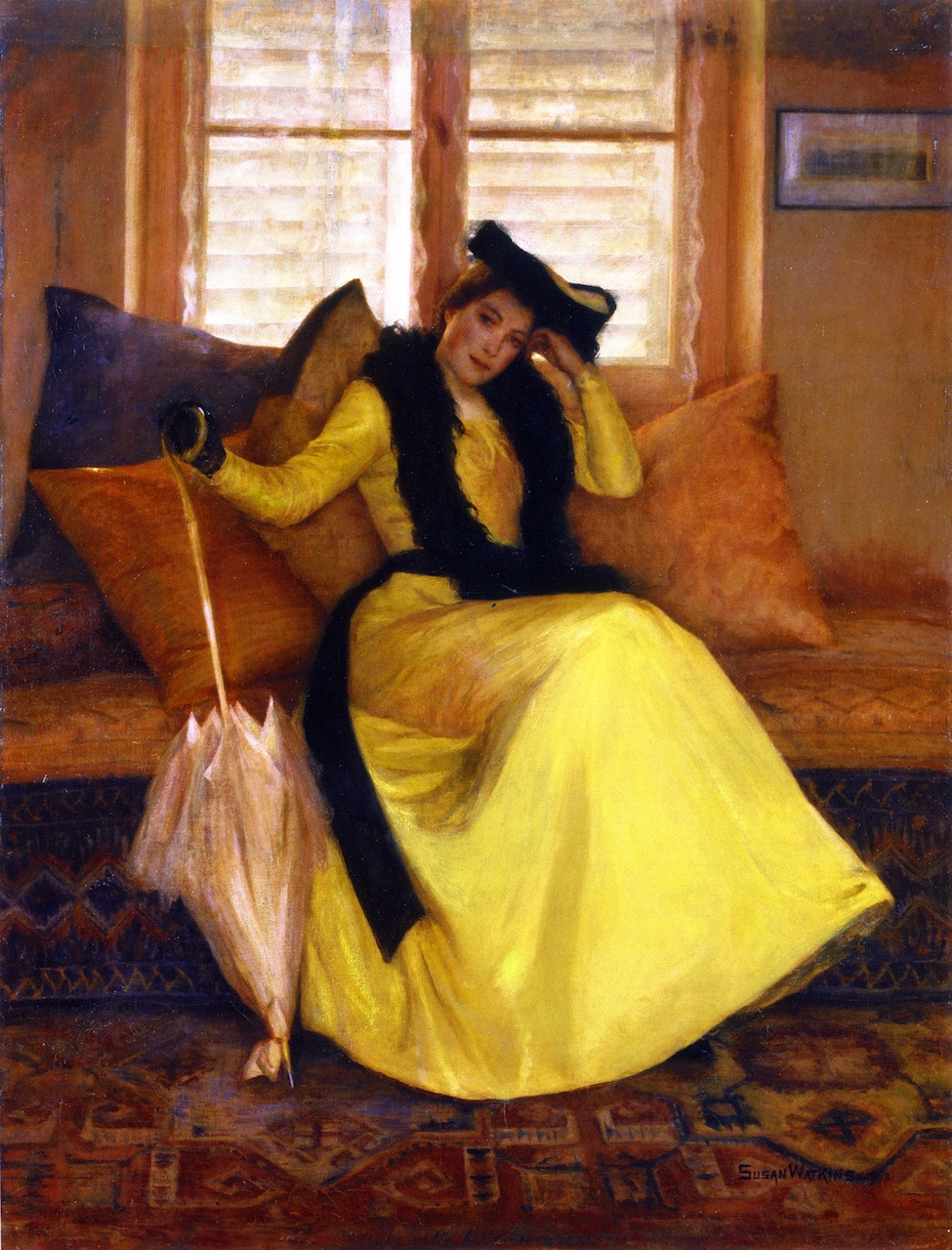
Lady in Yellow, 1902 - A portrait of Watkins's sister, Eleanor Reeves

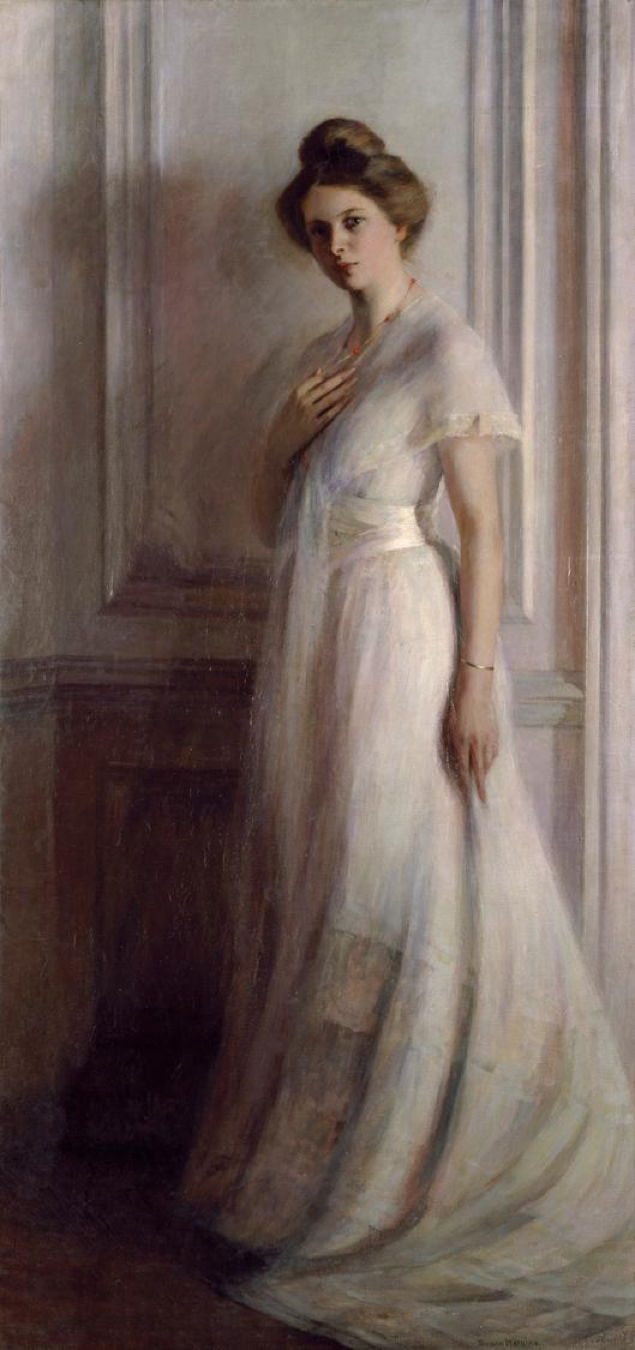
Marguerite, ca. 1906

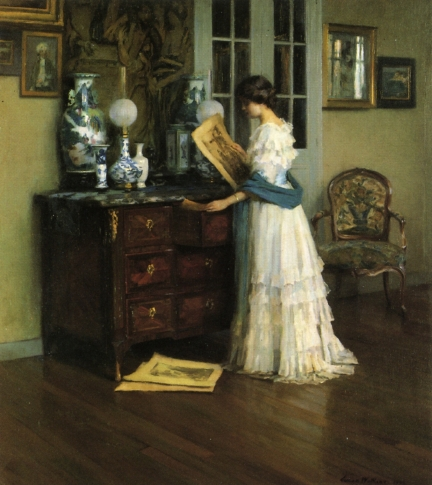
Woman in a French Interior, 1908

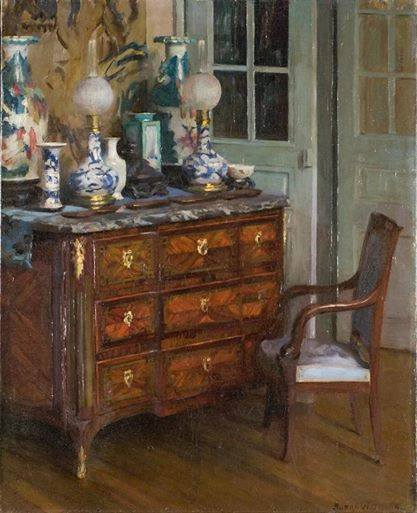
French Interior, 1908

=== Impressionism ===
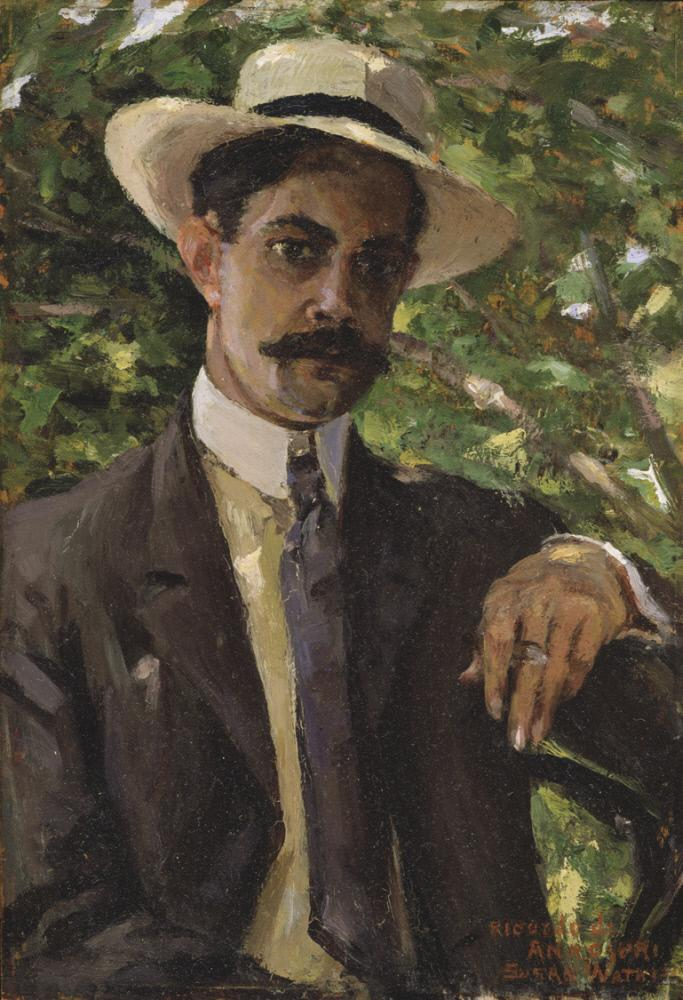
Portrait of Goldsborough Serpell, ca. 1906

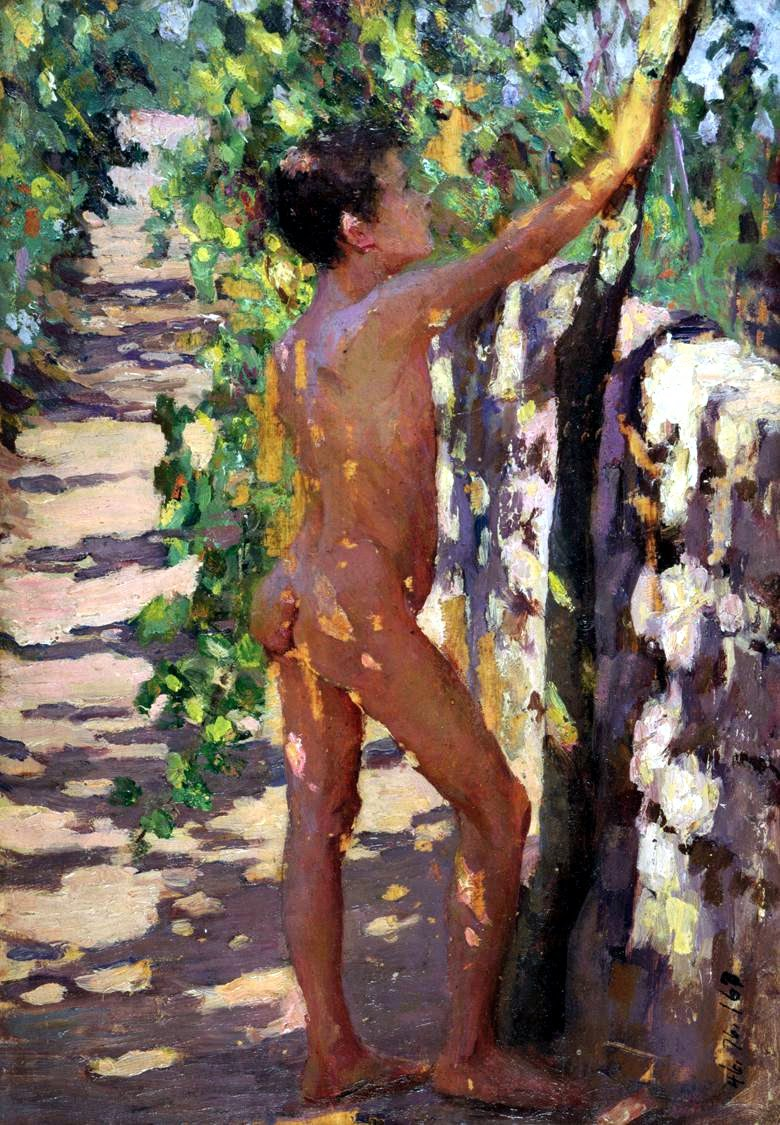
Study for Boys picking grapes at Capri, ca. 1906

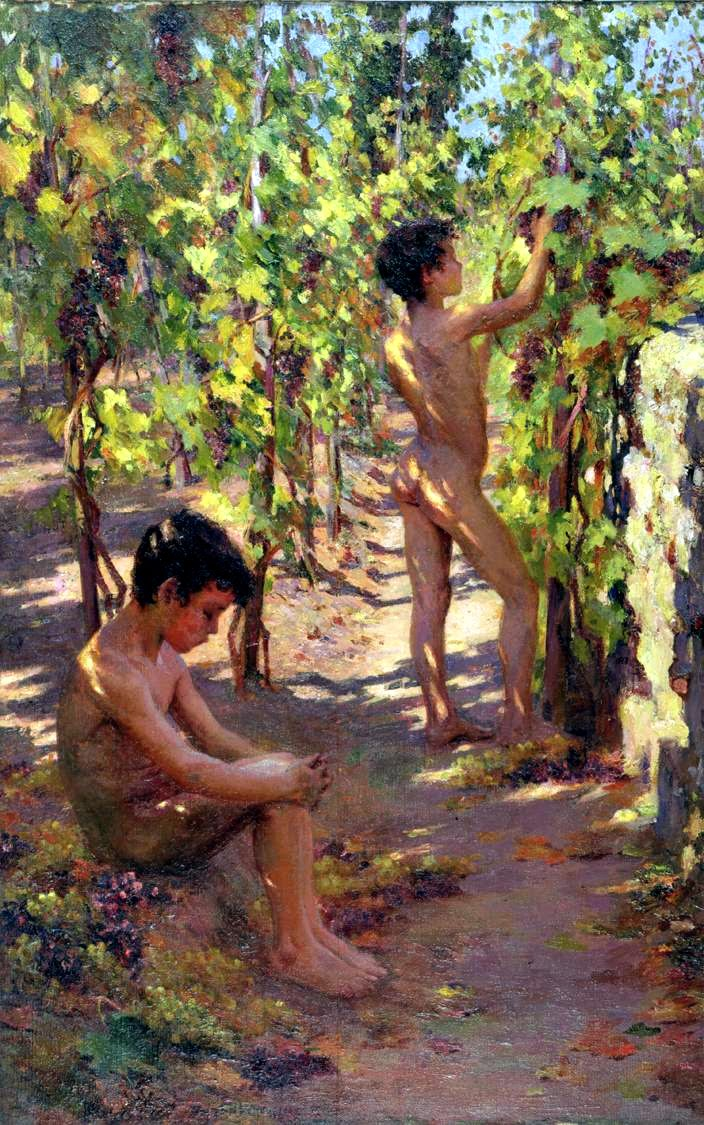
Boys picking grapes at Capri, ca.1906

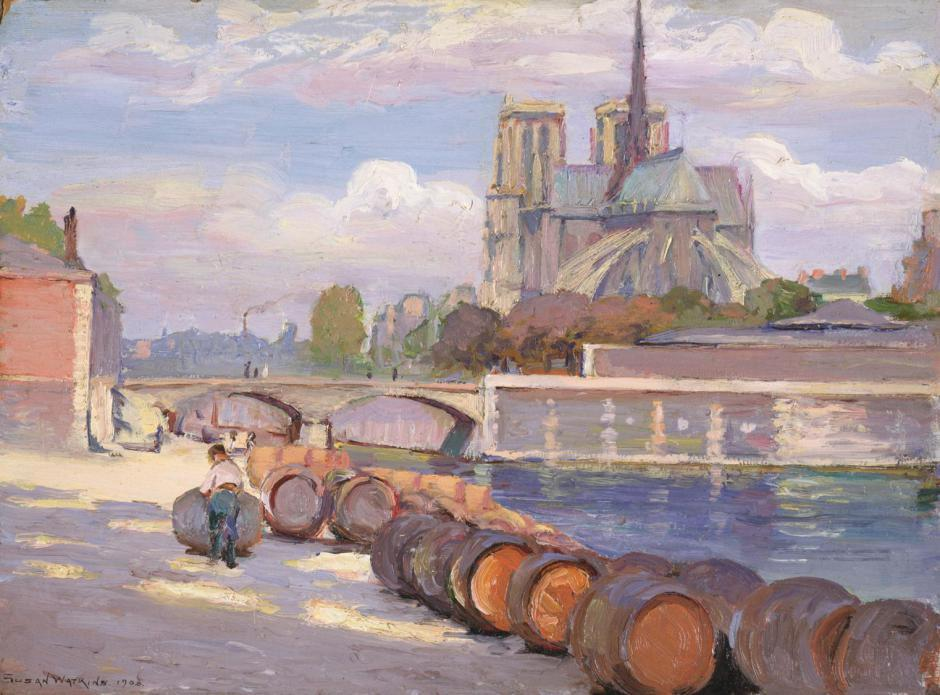
View of the Seine and Notre Dame from the Quai de la Tournelle, 1908

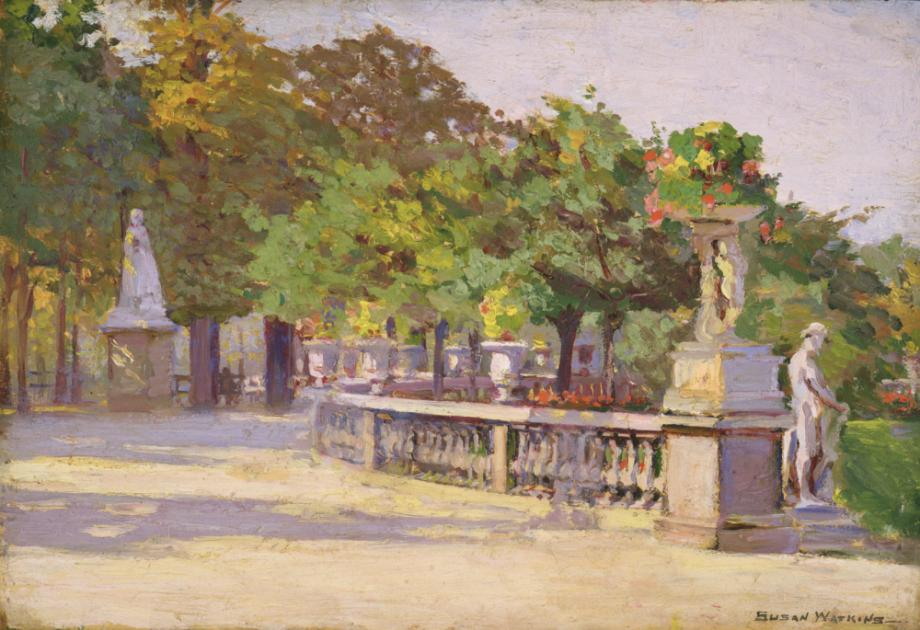
View of the Jardin du Luxembourg, ca. 1908

=== Sketches ===
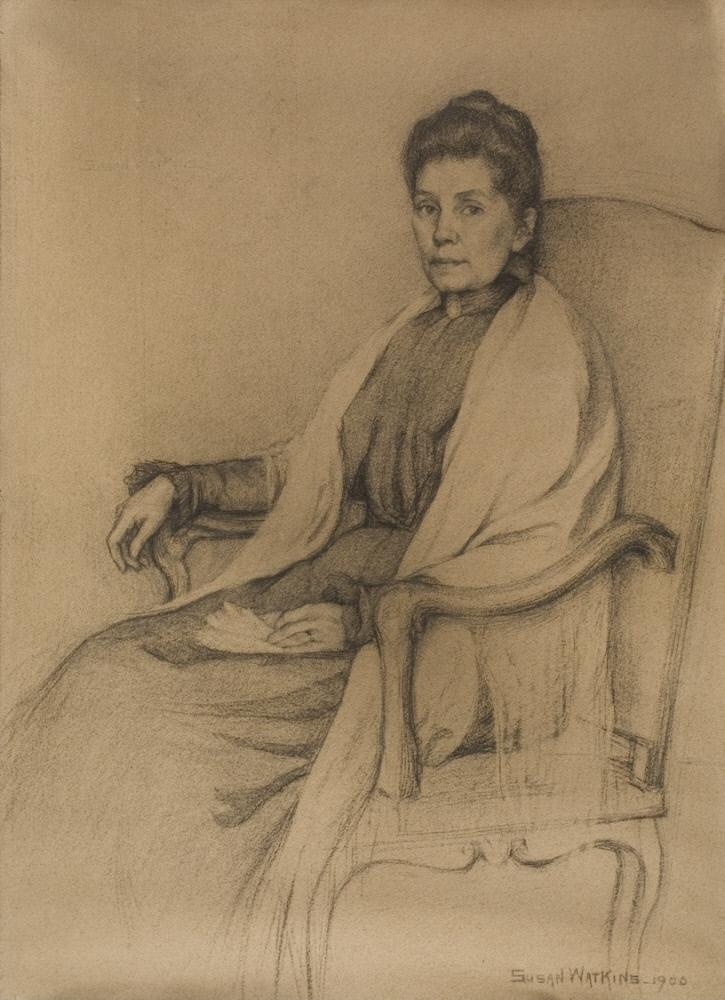
Mrs. Watkins, 1900

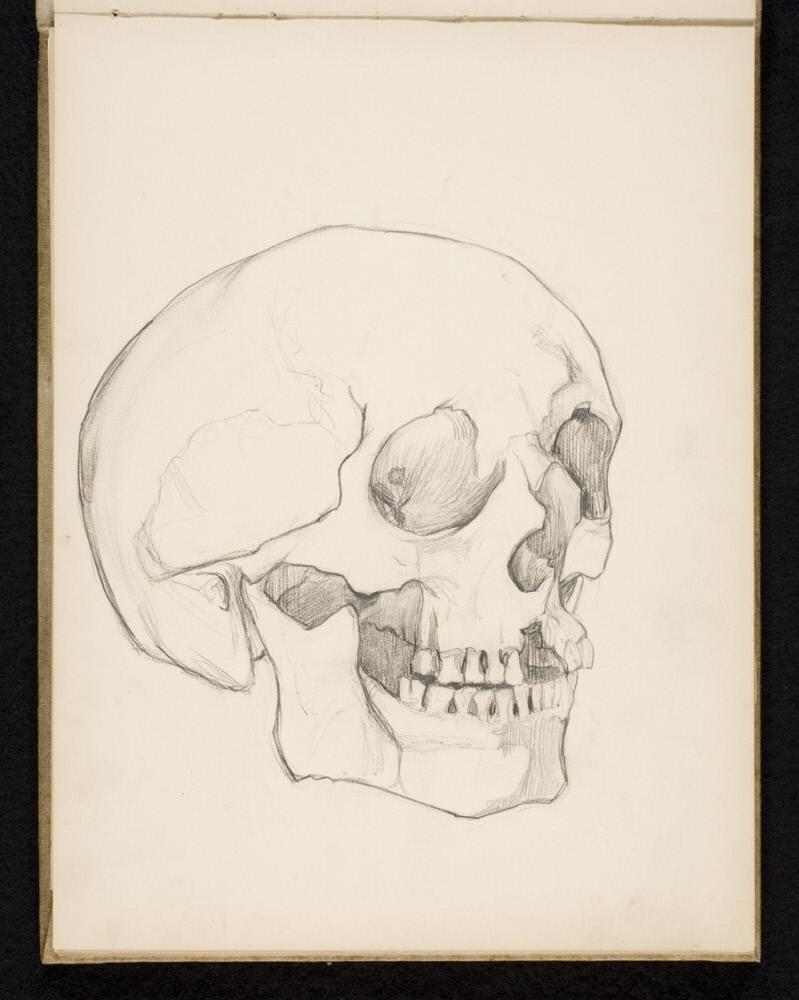
Pencil sketch of a skull, ca. 1897-1908

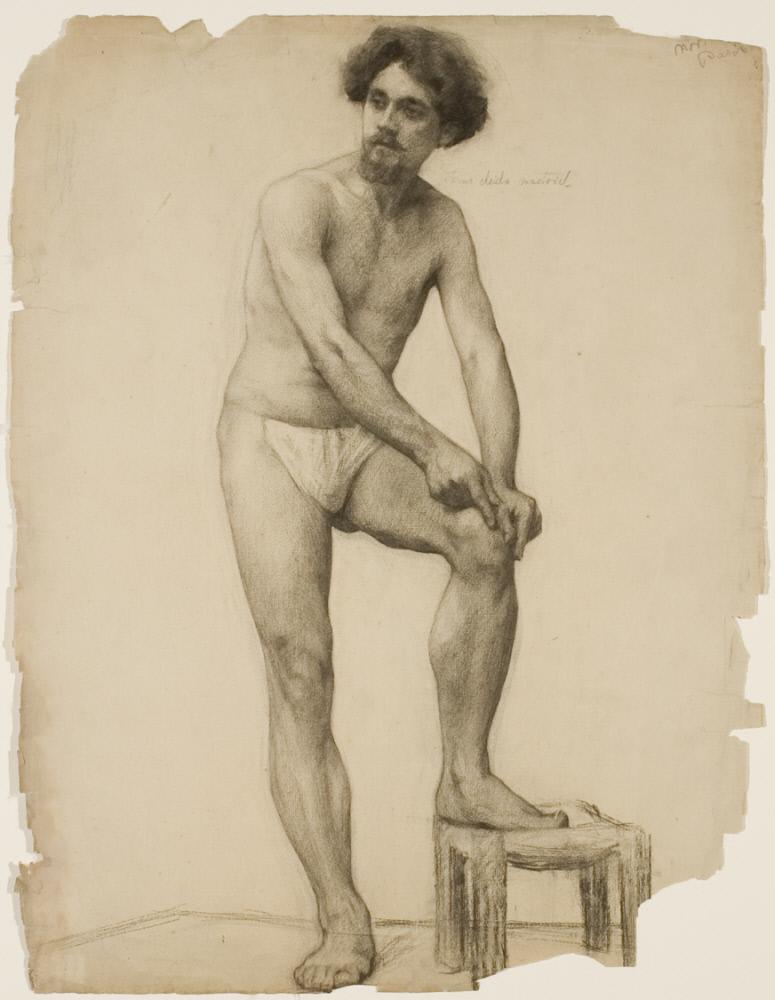
Study of Male Nude, 1897 in Conté crayon

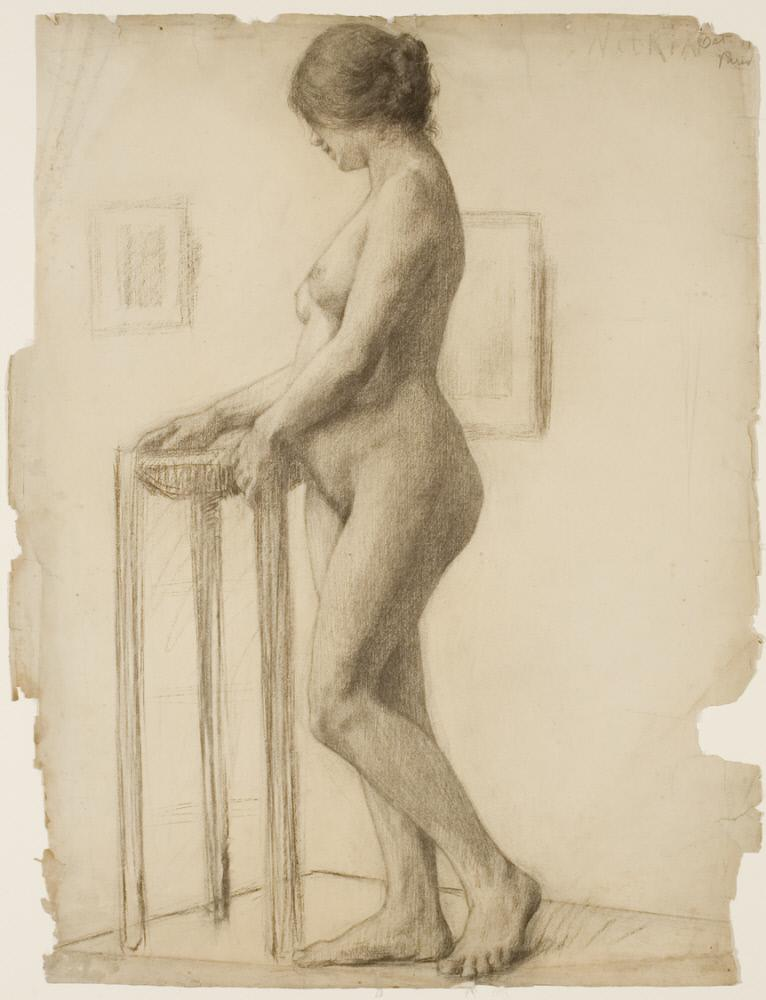
Study of Female Nude, in Profile with Prop, Conté crayon, ca. 1897

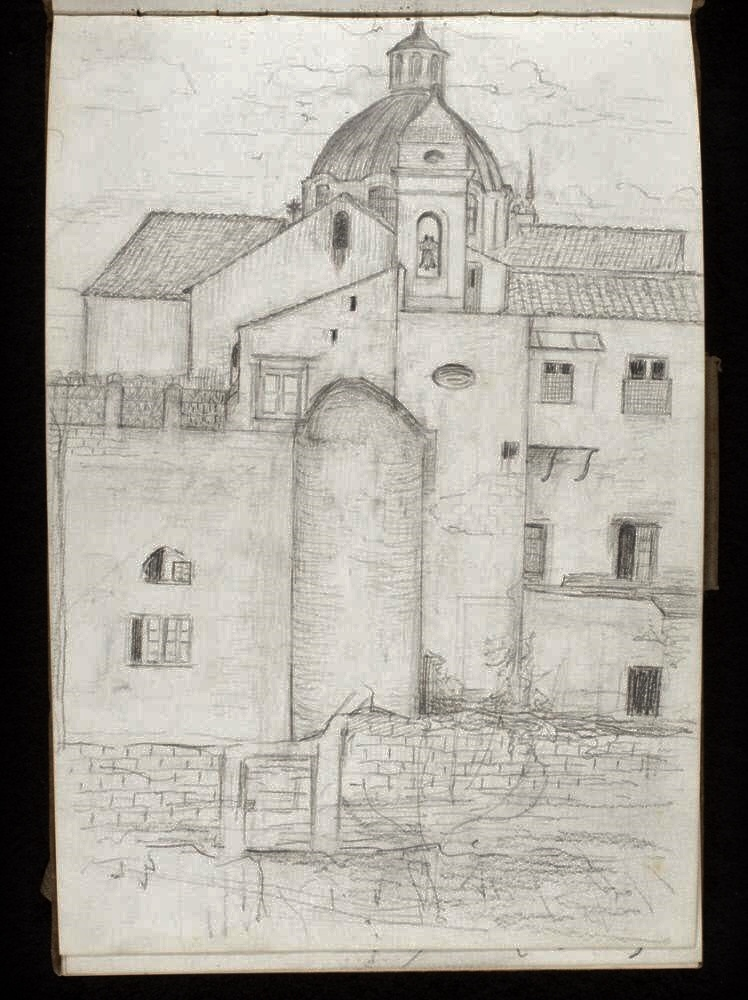
Sketch of a Church, 1899

=== Self-Portraits ===
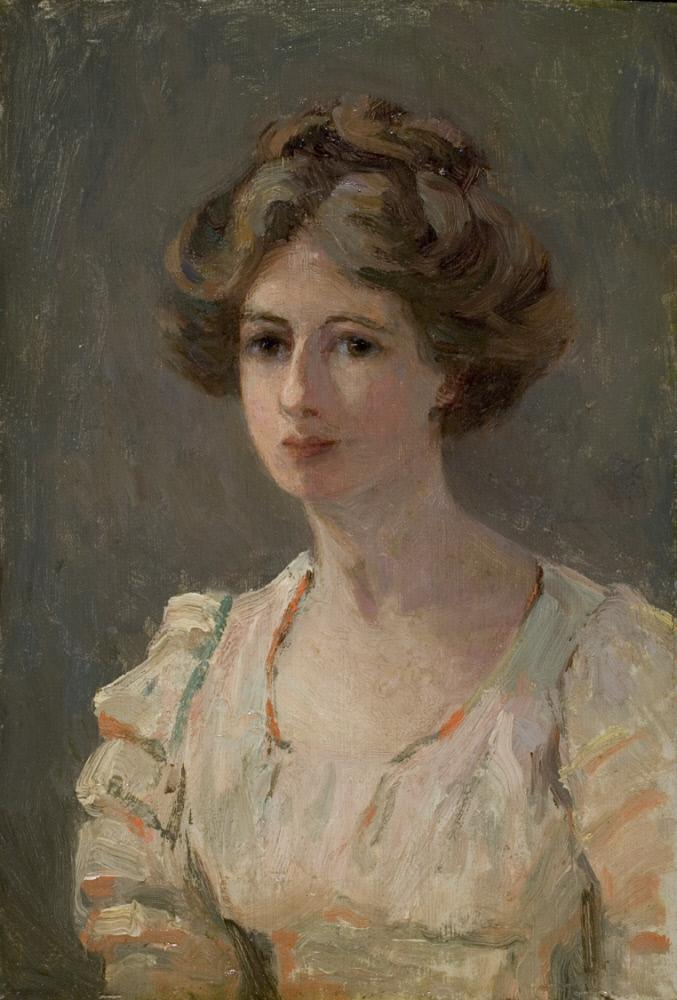
Portrait of a Lady. Oil paint self-portrait on board

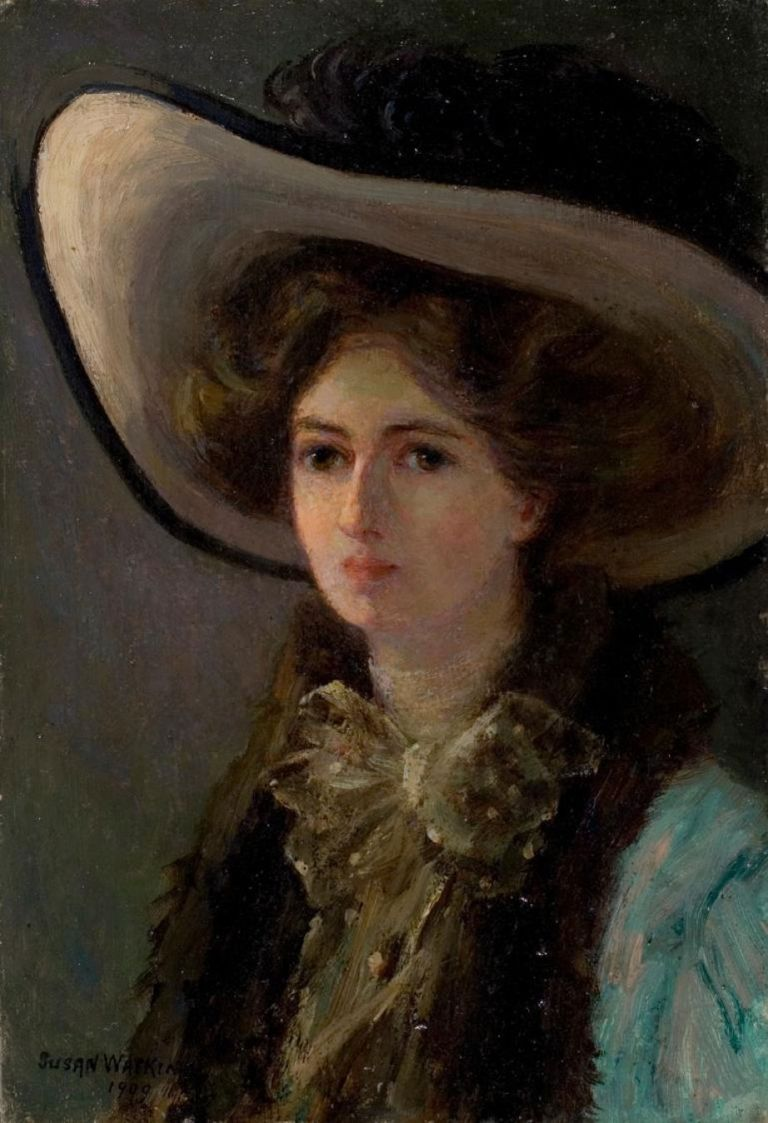
Self Portrait, 1909

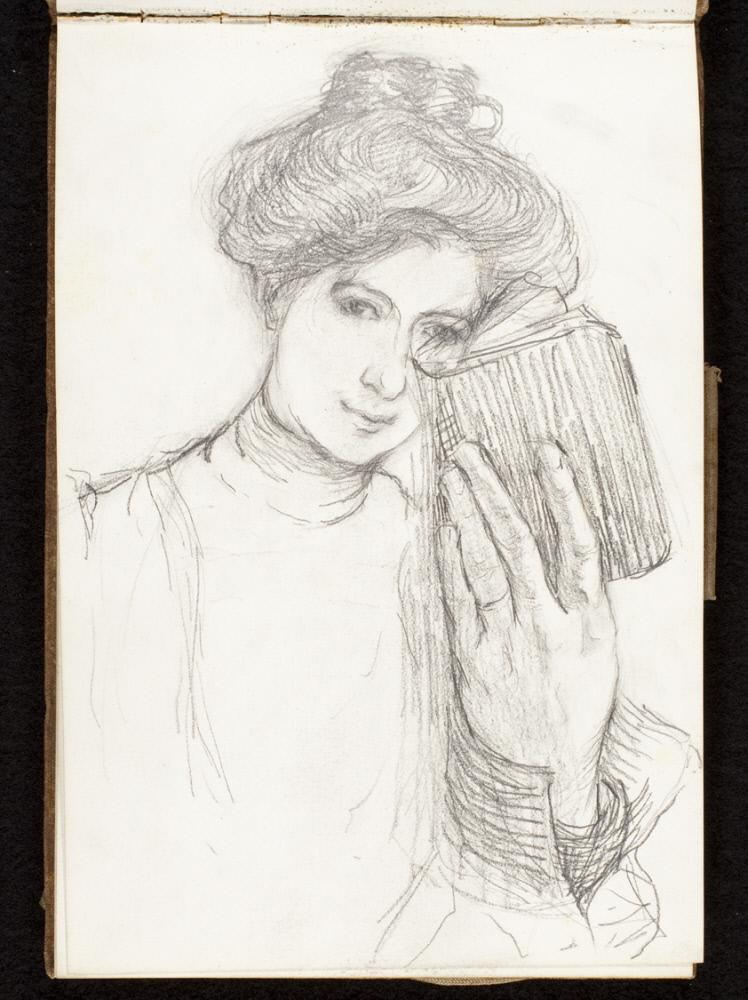
Sketchbook entry, pencil on paper, ca. 1899

=== Photographs of Watkins and relatives ===
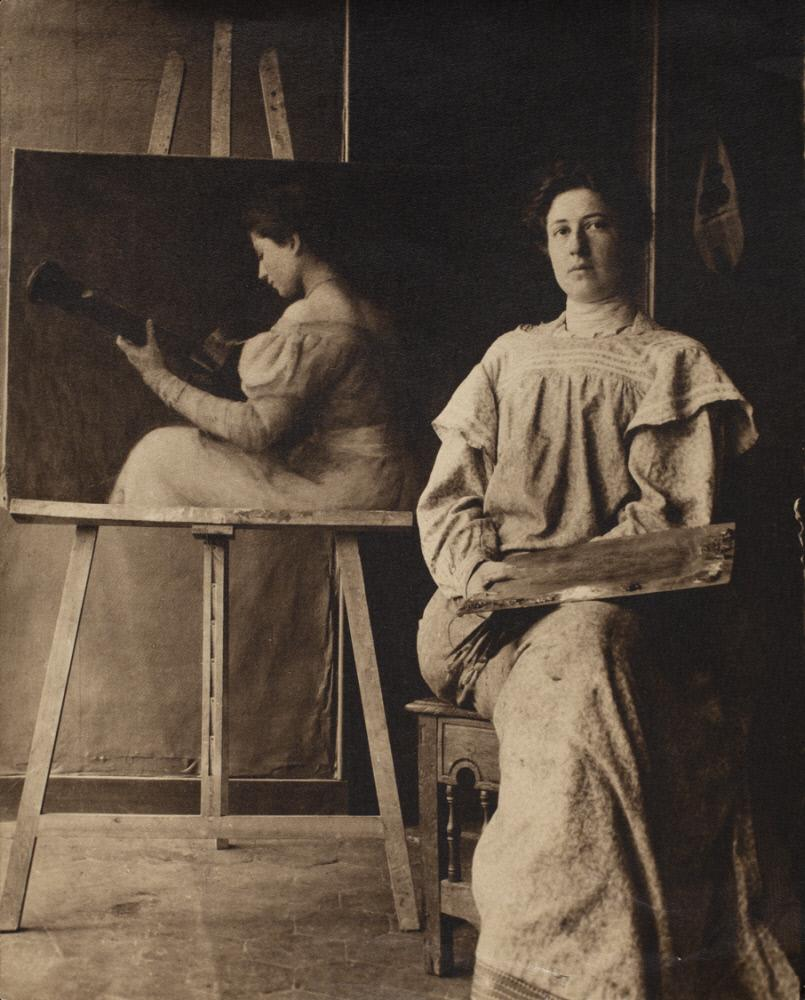
Portrait of Susan Watkins, Albumen print, ca. 1900. Photographer unknown.

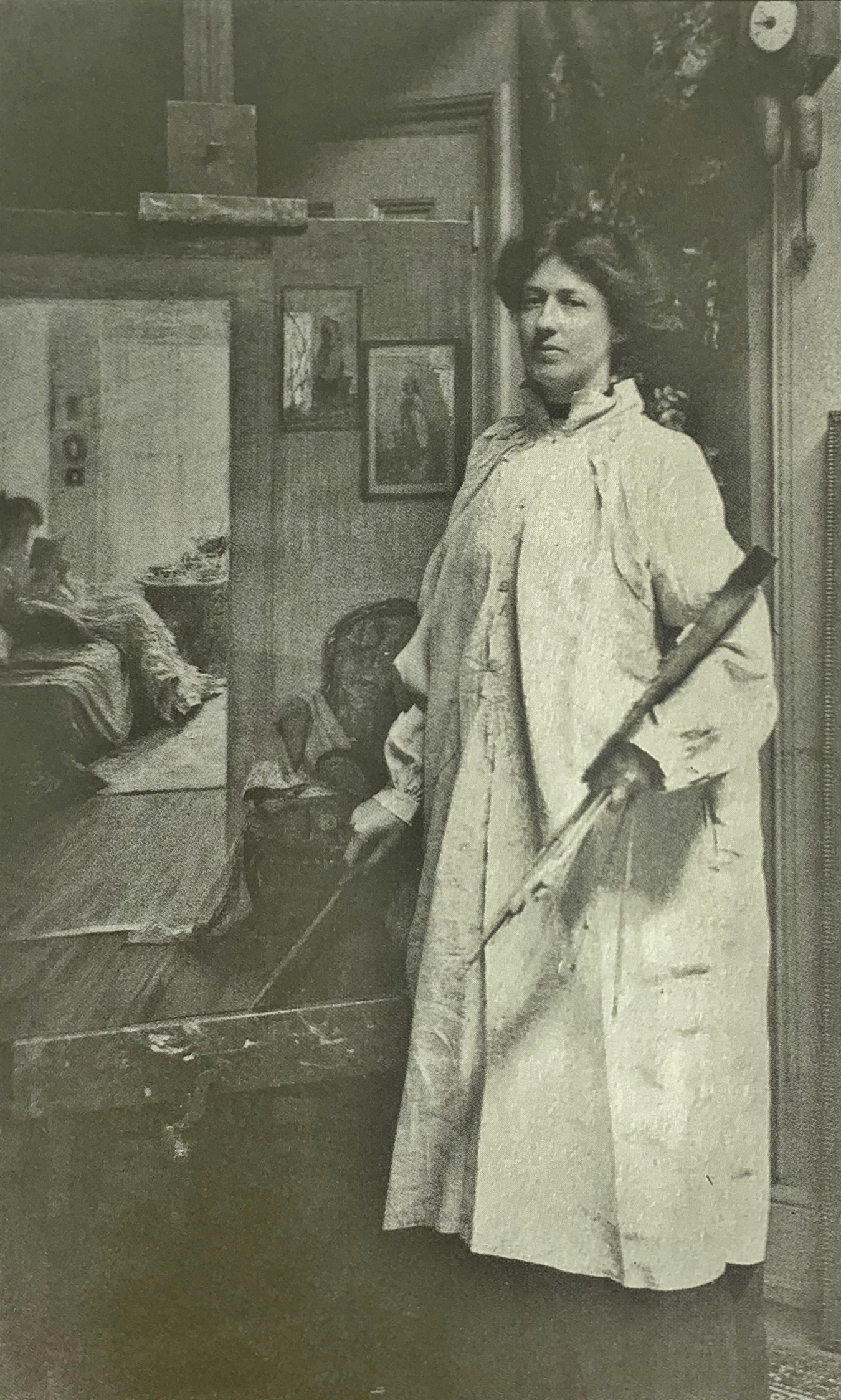
Photograph of Susan Watkins ca. 1910 from the Jean Outland Chrysler Library

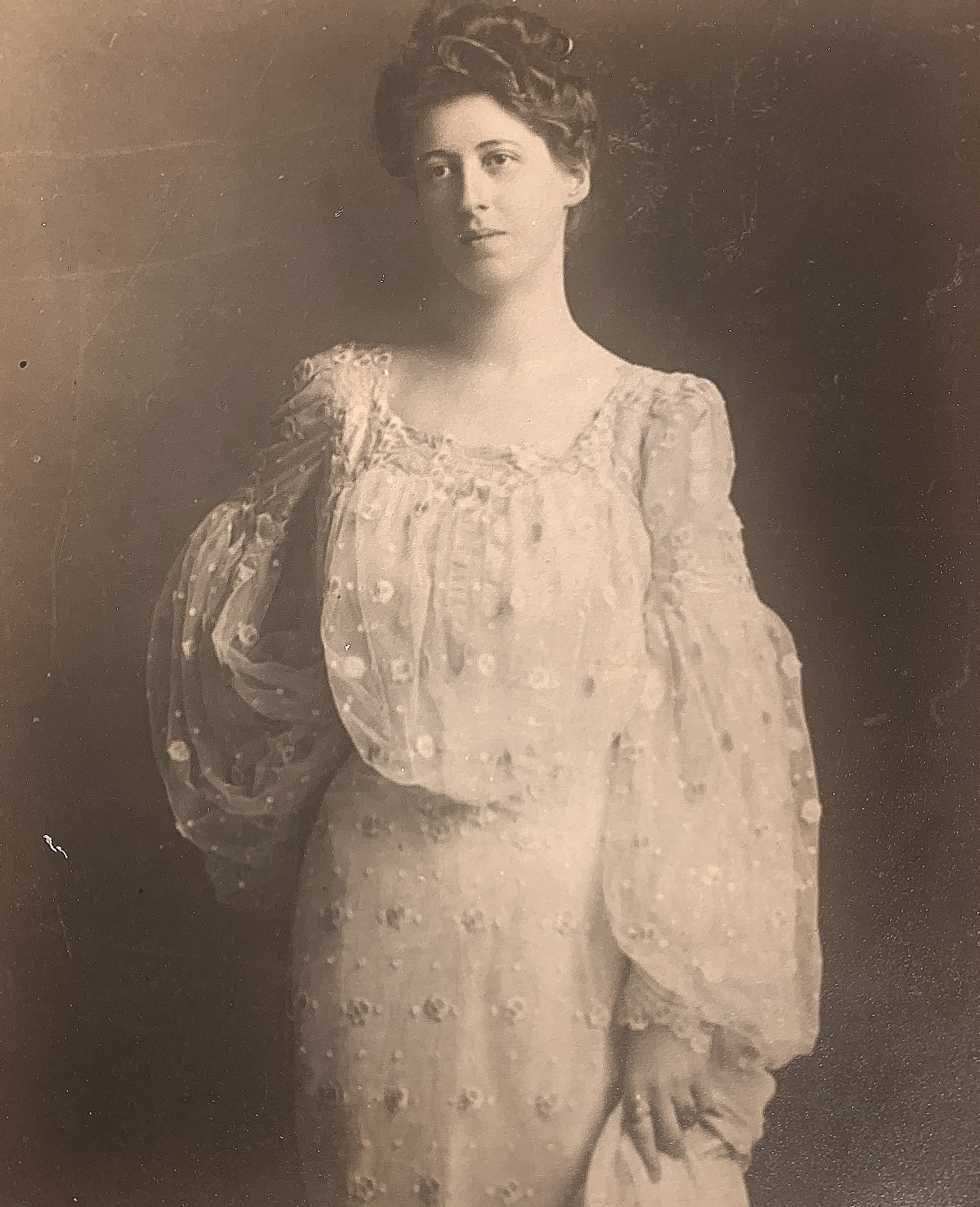
Photograph of Susan Watkins ca.1860-1913 from the Jean Outland Chrysler Library

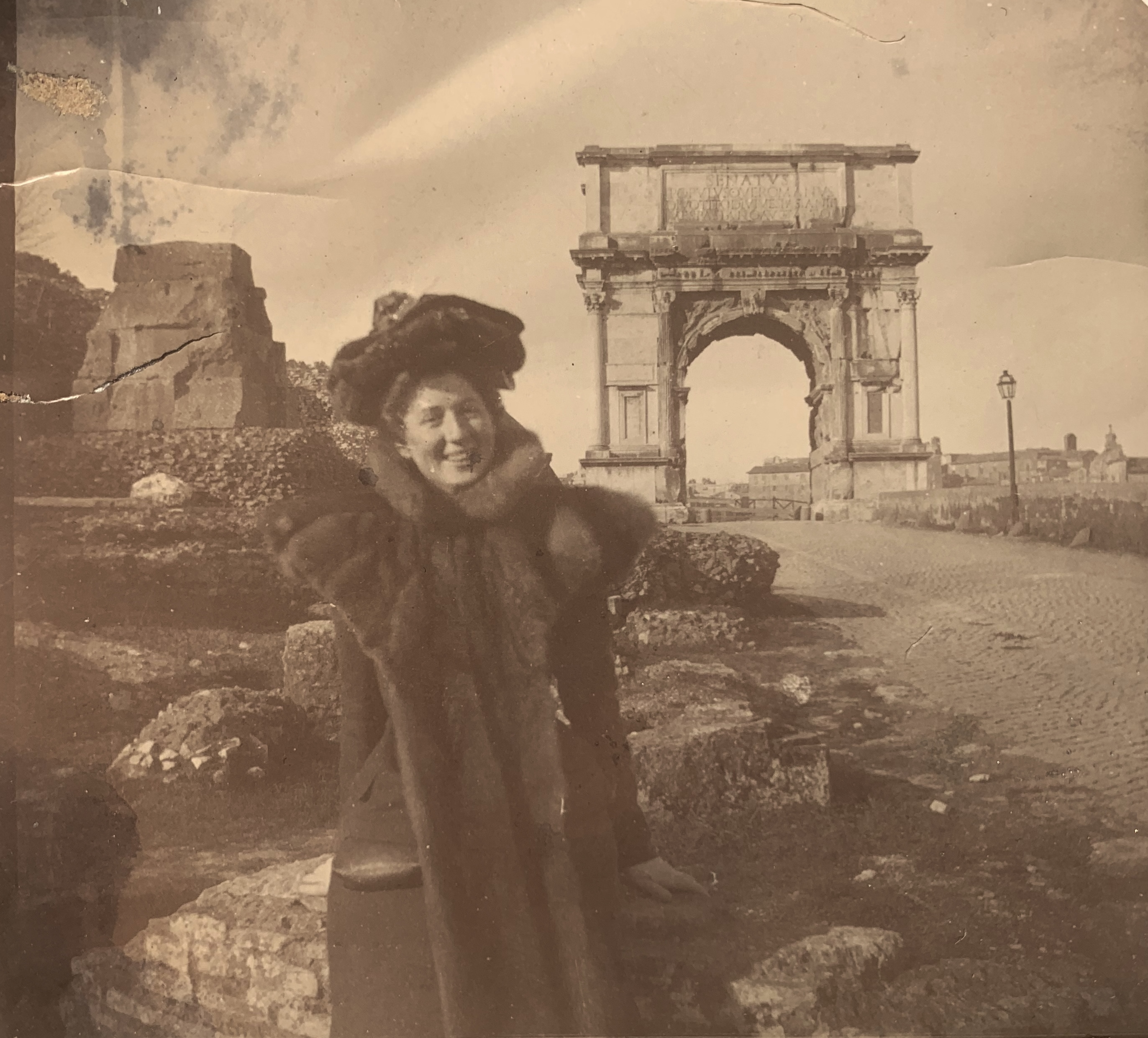
Photograph of Susan Watkins at the Arch of Titus in Rome, ca. 1896-1908 from the Jean Outland Chrysler Library

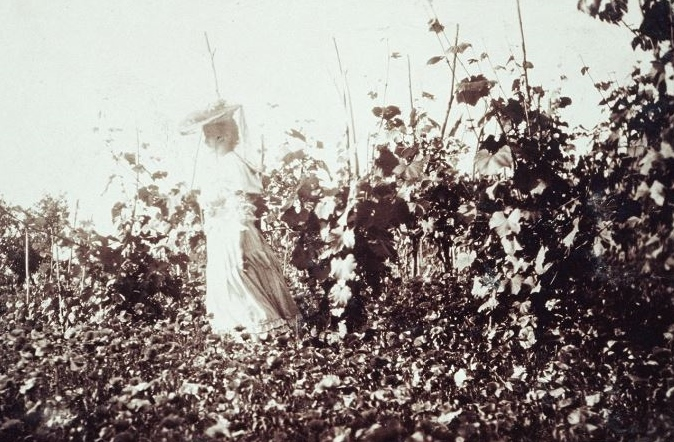
Photograph of Eleanor Reeves, sister of Susan Watkins and subject of Lady in Yellow

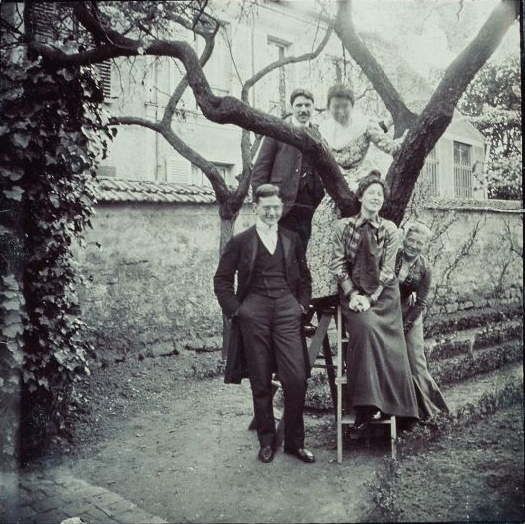
Photograph of Susan Watkins and unidentified friends or relatives. Watkins is front right, seated on a ladder. ca. 1891-1900

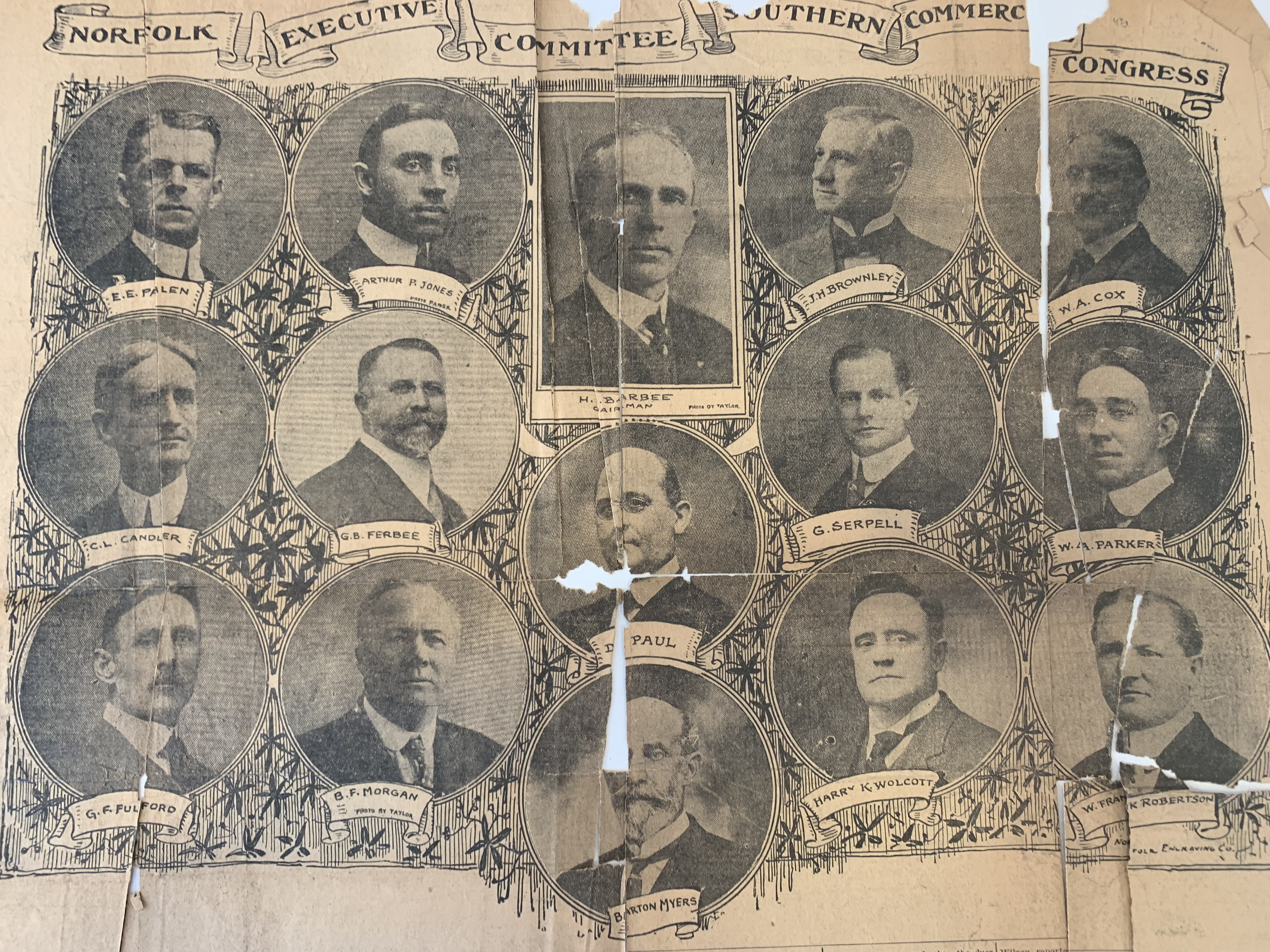
1916 Norfolk Executive Committee Southern Commercial Congress including Watkins's husband, Goldsborough Serpell and former Norfolk mayor Barton Myers
