= Edward Watkins =

Edward Watkins may refer to:

- Ed Watkins (1877–1933), American baseball player
- Eddie Watkins (1916–1995), Welsh dual-code rugby player
- Edward Watkins (rugby union), see List of Wales national rugby union players
- Edward Watkins, captain, see Josias Fendall

== See also ==
- Edward Watkin (disambiguation)
