= Richard Watkins (disambiguation) =

Richard Watkins is a horn player.

Richard Watkins may also refer to:

- Richard C. Watkins (1858–1941), English-American architect
- Richard Watkins (MP) (by 1507–1550), Member of Parliament (MP)

== See also ==
- Ricky Watkins, character in Burn Notice
