= John Watkins (baseball) =

- Catcher / Manager
- Born: May 18, 1857; Plantation near Durham, North Carolina, U.S.
- Died: February 22, 1924 (aged 66); Durham, North Carolina, U.S.

debut
- 1874, for the Fox Hunters of South Carolina

Last appearance
- 1907, for the Cuban Giants

Teams
- Fox Hunters (South Carolina) (1874); Quick Steps (Georgia) (1875); Cuban Giants (1885–1907); Terry McGovern's Cuba Winter Team (1906–1907); Pop Watkins Stars (1908); Pop Watkins Giants (1909); (as manager): Havana Red Sox (1907–1919); Gouverneur, New York (1918); Ganonoque, Ontario (1919); Charlotte Red Sox (1920–1921); (as college team manager): Harbison College, Irmo, SC (unknown years); Shaw University (unknown years); Manhattan College (1904)

John McCreary "Pop" Watkins (May 18, 1857 – February 22, 1924) was an American Negro leagues catcher and manager for several years before the founding of the first Negro National League.

Watkins played most of his career for the Cuban Giants, until he broke his leg playing for the Giants at Oil City, Pennsylvania in May 1907. Since the Cuban Giants broke off into several teams, such as the Cuban X-Giants, the Genuine Cuban Giants, the Original Cuban Giants, and even the Famous Cuban Giants, researchers are still working out which players played for which teams, and how the teams split up.

He continued to manage several teams, some called "Pop Watkins Stars" or "Pop Watkins Giants." Sometime after 1909, he would start the Havana Red Sox, a team which he managed until he died in 1924. During his career, he is said to have helped along the careers of George Dixon, Toussaint Allen, Phil Cockrell, Gifford McDonald, Luke Archer, and Dennis Graham.

As a scout, Watkins is also alleged to have found many white players while scouting for the majors, including John McGraw, Hughie Jennings, John Hummel, Al Schacht, and Jack Dunn.

In the off-season, census records show Watkins may have sold sporting goods. And on his death certificate, it lists Watkins as a "baseball trainer."
