= Steven Watkins =

Steven Watkins or Steve Watkins or Stephen Watkins may refer to

- Steve Watkins (baseball) (Stephen Douglas Watkins, born 1978), American baseball pitcher
- Steve Watkins (Steven Charles Watkins Jr., born 1976), American politician
- Stephen Watkins (Stephen George Watkins, born 1959), English cricketer
