= Paul B. Watkins =

American physician and pharmacologist

- Born: 1953 (age 72–73); Scotia, New York, U.S.
- Education: Cornell University (BA); Cornell Medical College (MD)
- Known for: CYP3A4 characterization; grapefruit juice–drug interaction; DILIsym software
- Scientific career
- Fields: Hepatology; Pharmacology; Toxicology
- Workplaces: University of North Carolina at Chapel Hill

Paul Brent Watkins (born 1953) is an American physician, hepatologist, and pharmacologist. He is the Howard Q. Ferguson Distinguished Professor at the University of North Carolina Eshelman School of Pharmacy and Professor of Medicine and Public Health at UNC Chapel Hill. His research has focused on drug metabolism, drug-induced liver injury (DILI), and computational toxicology.

He is a Fellow of American College of Physicians, American Gastroenterological Association, and American Association for the Study of Liver Diseases.

== Early life and education ==
Watkins was raised in Scotia, New York, and attended Burnt Hills–Ballston Lake Senior High School. He received a B.A. in Physical Chemistry from Cornell University in 1975 and an M.D. from Weill Cornell Medical College in 1979.

He completed his internship and residency in internal medicine at The New York Hospital–Cornell Medical Center (1979–1982). He then served as a physician at the Khao-I-Dang Cambodian refugee camp in Thailand (April–July 1982), followed by a fellowship in gastroenterology and hepatology at the Medical College of Virginia (1982–1984), where he also trained as an NIH-funded research fellow in environmental medicine and clinical toxicology.

== Academic career ==
Watkins joined the faculty of the Medical College of Virginia as an instructor and later assistant professor of medicine (1984–1986). He subsequently moved to the University of Michigan, where he rose to full professor of medicine and served as director of the General Clinical Research Center (1991–1999), and was appointed professor of pharmacology in 1998.

In 1999, he joined UNC Chapel Hill as the Verne S. Caviness Distinguished Professor of Medicine and Professor of Pharmacy, and director of the General Clinical Research Center. He became the inaugural director of the Hamner-UNC Institute for Drug Safety Sciences (2008–2023) and was named the Howard Q. Ferguson Distinguished Professor of Pharmacy in 2016. He also holds an appointment as Professor of Public Health. Since 2023, he has served as co-director and contact principal investigator for the Triangle Center of Excellence in Regulatory Science and Innovation (CESI), an FDA-funded collaborative centre involving UNC, Duke University, North Carolina State University, and North Carolina Central University.

== Research ==
=== CYP3A4 and drug metabolism ===
Watkins was lead author on a 1985 paper in Proceedings of the National Academy of Sciences that characterised an inducible form of cytochrome P450 in human liver, later designated CYP3A4, an enzyme now understood to be involved in the metabolism of a large proportion of clinically used drugs.

A 1987 paper in the Journal of Clinical Investigation by his group reported expression of CYP3A4 in the wall of the small intestine, indicating that this enzyme contributes to limiting the oral absorption of certain drugs before they reach systemic circulation.

He developed and patented the ^{14}C-erythromycin breath test (ERMBT) as a non-invasive measure of hepatic CYP3A4 activity.

Watkins was senior author on a 1991 Lancet study conducted during human liver transplantation that demonstrated substantial first-pass metabolism of ciclosporin in the gut.

=== Grapefruit juice–drug interaction ===
Watkins's laboratory identified the furanocoumarin 6′,7′-dihydroxybergamottin (DHB) as a principal constituent of grapefruit juice responsible for its interactions with certain medications. A 1997 Journal of Clinical Investigation study described the mechanism by which grapefruit juice decreases intestinal CYP3A protein expression, thereby increasing the oral bioavailability of affected drugs.

=== Drug-induced liver injury ===
Watkins was senior author on a 2023 Gastroenterology paper that identified a genetic risk score, incorporating reduced ERAP2 expression and a novel HLA allele associated with susceptibility to drug-induced liver injury from amoxicillin-clavulanate.

A 2006 JAMA study reported elevations in serum alanine aminotransferase (ALT) in healthy subjects receiving four grams of acetaminophen daily.

== Honours and awards ==
- American Society for Clinical Investigation (elected 1993)
- Fellow, American College of Physicians (1994)
- NIH MERIT Award (1998–2008)
- Association of American Physicians (elected 2006)
- Fellow, American Gastroenterological Association (2009)
- Fellow, American Association for the Study of Liver Diseases (2014)
- Agilent Thought Leader Award (2014)
- Rawls-Palmer Progress in Medicine Award, American Society for Clinical Pharmacology and Therapeutics (2015)
- Society of Toxicology Top Manuscript Award, Toxicological Sciences (2015)
- ASPET Division for Toxicology Career Award, American Society for Pharmacology and Experimental Therapeutics (2018)
- Distinguished Scientist Award, American College of Toxicology (2023)
- Hyman J. Zimmerman State-of-the-Art Plenary Lecture, American Association for the Study of Liver Diseases (2004, 2026)
- Honorary Membership, Society of Toxicologic Pathology (2004)

== Selected publications ==
- Watkins, PB; Wrighton, SA; Maurel, P (1985). "Identification of an inducible form of cytochrome P-450 in human liver". Proceedings of the National Academy of Sciences. 82 (18): 6310–6314. Bibcode:1985PNAS...82.6310W. doi:10.1073/pnas.82.18.6310. PMC 391043. PMID 3898085.
- Watkins, PB; Wrighton, SA; Schuetz, E; Molowa, D; Guzelian, PS (1987). "Identification of dexamethasone inducible cytochromes P-450 in intestinal mucosa of rat and man". Journal of Clinical Investigation. 80 (4): 1029–1036. doi:10.1172/JCI113156. PMC 442342. PMID 3654968.
- Watkins, PB; Murray, SA; Winkelman, LG (1989). "Erythromycin breath test as an assay of glucocorticoid-inducible liver cytochromes P-450". Journal of Clinical Investigation. 83 (2): 688–697. doi:10.1172/JCI113933. PMC 303730. PMID 2913056.
- Kolars, JC; Awni, WM; Merion, RM; Watkins, PB (1991). "First-pass metabolism of cyclosporin by the gut". The Lancet. 338 (8781): 1488–1491. doi:10.1016/0140-6736(91)92302-I. hdl:2027.42/28982. PMID 1683920.
- Lown, KS; Bailey, DG; Fontana, RJ (1997). "Grapefruit juice increases felodipine oral availability in humans by decreasing intestinal CYP3A protein expression". Journal of Clinical Investigation. 99 (10): 2545–2553. doi:10.1172/JCI119438. PMC 508095. PMID 9153298.
- Watkins, PB; Kaplowitz, N; Slattery, JT (2006). "Aminotransferase elevations in healthy adults receiving 4 grams of acetaminophen daily". JAMA. 296 (1): 87–93. doi:10.1001/jama.296.1.87. PMID 16820551.
- Howell, BA; Yang, Y; Kumar, R (2012). "In vitro to in vivo extrapolation and species response comparisons for DILI using DILIsym". Journal of Pharmacokinetics and Pharmacodynamics. 39 (5): 527–541. doi:10.1007/s10928-012-9266-0. PMID 22875368.
- Watkins, PB (2019). "The DILI-sim Initiative: Insights into Hepatotoxicity Mechanisms and Biomarker Interpretation". Clinical and Translational Science. 12 (2): 122–129. doi:10.1111/cts.12629. PMC 6440570. PMID 30762301.
- Nicoletti, P; Dellinger, A; Li, YJ (2023). "Identification of reduced ERAP2 expression and a novel HLA allele as components of a risk score for susceptibility to liver injury due to amoxicillin-clavulanate". Gastroenterology. 164 (3): 454–466. doi:10.1053/j.gastro.2022.11.018. PMC 10009756. PMID 36402190.
