= David Watkins (cricketer) =

English cricketer

Personal information
- Full name: David Watkins
- Born: 18 August 1926 (age 100); St Albans, Hertfordshire, England
- Batting: Right-handed
- Bowling: Right-arm medium

Domestic team information
- Years: Team
- 1949–1954: Essex

Career statistics
Competition	First-class
Matches	12
Runs scored	210
Batting average	16.15
100s/50s	–/–
Top score	32
Balls bowled	693
Wickets	8
Bowling average	52.62
5 wickets in innings	–
10 wickets in match	–
Best bowling	2/45
Catches/stumpings	5/–
- Source: Cricinfo, 28 October 2011

David Watkins (born 18 August 1928) is a former English cricketer. Watkins was a right-handed batsman who bowled right-arm medium pace. He was born at St Albans, Hertfordshire.

Watkins made his first-class appearances for Essex against Northamptonshire. He appeared infrequently for Essex, making eleven further first-class appearances, the last of which came against Kent in the 1954 County Championship, In his twelve first-class matches, he scored 210 runs at an average of 16.15, with a high score of 32. With the ball, he took 8 wickets at a bowling average of 52.62, with best figures of 2/45. He left Essex at the end of the 1955 season.
