= Eddie Watkinson =

- Born: 1979 (age 46–47); Mineola, New York
- Education: Parsons The New School for Design, Design and Technology Program
- Known for: Animation, Motion Graphics, and Internet Art
- Notable work: "Deus ex Machina", "Revelations"
- Awards: 2007 SIGGRAPH, 2006, 2007 Parsons animation Festival

Eddie Watkinson (born 1979) is an experimental video and internet artist. Eddie studied design and technology at Parsons The New School for Design. Eddie has had his work shown nationwide through Siggraph and at New york Animation Festivals. In 2009 he competed in the motion graphics competition at Cut&Paste. Eddie has animated several television and film spots including Iceroad Truckers, Inside Edition, and ESPN Classic.
