= Thomas Watkins (disambiguation) =

Thomas Watkins is a fictional character in the TV series Upstairs, Downstairs.

Thomas or Tom Watkins may also refer to:

- Thomas Benjamin Watkins (1856–1933), English Anglican priest
- Thomas C. Watkins (1818–1903), Canadian writer
- T. H. Watkins (1936–2000), American magazine editor and author
- Tom Watkins (American football) (1937–2011), American football running back
- Tom Watkins (music manager) (1949–2020), British pop impresario, writer, composer, designer and fine art collector
- Tom Watkins (politician) (active 1985–1992), former member of the Ohio House of Representatives
- Tommy Watkins (born 1980), baseball player and minor league coach

== See also ==
- Thomas & Sarah, a British drama series, featuring the character
- Thomas Watkin (disambiguation)
