= Phil Gwatkin =

English footballer

Personal information
- Full name: Philip Arthur Gwatkin
- Date of birth: 5 August 1929
- Place of birth: Harrow, England
- Date of death: 9 July 2006 (aged 76)
- Place of death: Wallasey, England
- Position: Winger

Senior career*
Years	Team	Apps	(Gls)
1953–1956	Wrexham	56	(8)
1956–1957	Tranmere Rovers	21	(6)
- Northwich Victoria
Total		77	(14)
- * Club domestic league appearances and goals

Phil Gwatkin (5 August 1929 – 9 July 2006) was an English footballer, who played as a winger in the Football League for Wrexham and Tranmere Rovers.
