= Hugh Watkins =

Hugh Watkins may refer to:

- Hugh Watkins (referee) (born 1963), Welsh rugby referee
- Hugh Christian Watkins (born 1959), English cardiologist and professor
