= Watling =

Watling is a surname. Notable people with the surname include:

- Alan Watling (born 1948), Australian rules footballer
- Barry Watling (born 1946), English footballer
- BJ Watling (born 1985), New Zealand-South African cricketer
- Bradley-John Watling (born 1985), New Zealand cricketer
- Deborah Watling (1948–2017), English actress
- Dick Watling (born 1951), Fijian ornithologist
- Dilys Watling (1943–2021), English actress
- E. F. Watling (1899–1990), English classicist and translator
- Geoffrey Watling (1913–2004), English president
- Giles Watling (born 1953), English actor and politician
- Jack Watling (1923–2001), English actor
- John Watling (died 1681), 17th-century British buccaneer
- John Leonard Watling (1923–2004), British philosopher
- Jonathan Watling (born 1976), American rower
- Josser Watling (1925–2023), English footballer
- Leonor Watling (born 1975), Spanish actress
- Ralph Watling (1872–1951), English badminton player
- Roy Watling (born 1934), Scottish mycologist
- Pearlie Watling (1905–1996), Australian miner and folk musician

== See also ==
- Watling Estate, the LCC housing estate in Edgware, London
- Watling Island, name for San Salvador Island 1680–1925
- Watling Street, Roman road in England
