= Edward Watkin (disambiguation) =

Edward Watkin may refer to:

- Edward Watkin (1819–1901), a railway chairman and politician.
- Edward Watkin, nephew of the above, railway manager of the Hull and Barnsley Railway
- Edward Ingram Watkin (1888–1981), English writer

== See also ==
- Edward Watkins (disambiguation)
