= Watcyn Clywedog =

Welsh poet

Watcyn Clywedog (fl. c. 1630 – 1650) was a Welsh poet. He worked mainly around North Wales, often for various families, and many of his compositions are elegies. Over fifty of his poems still survive, and provide examples of poetic traditions such as Cywyddau and Englynion.
