= Derek Watkins =

Derek or Derrick Watkins is the name of:

- Derek Watkins (trumpeter) (1945–2013), British session musician
- Derek Watkins, dock workers shop steward and one of the Pentonville Five
- Derrick Watkins (musician) (born 1974), American musician
- Derrick Watkins (born 1983), Australian rugby league player
