= Enid Watkins =

American opera singer

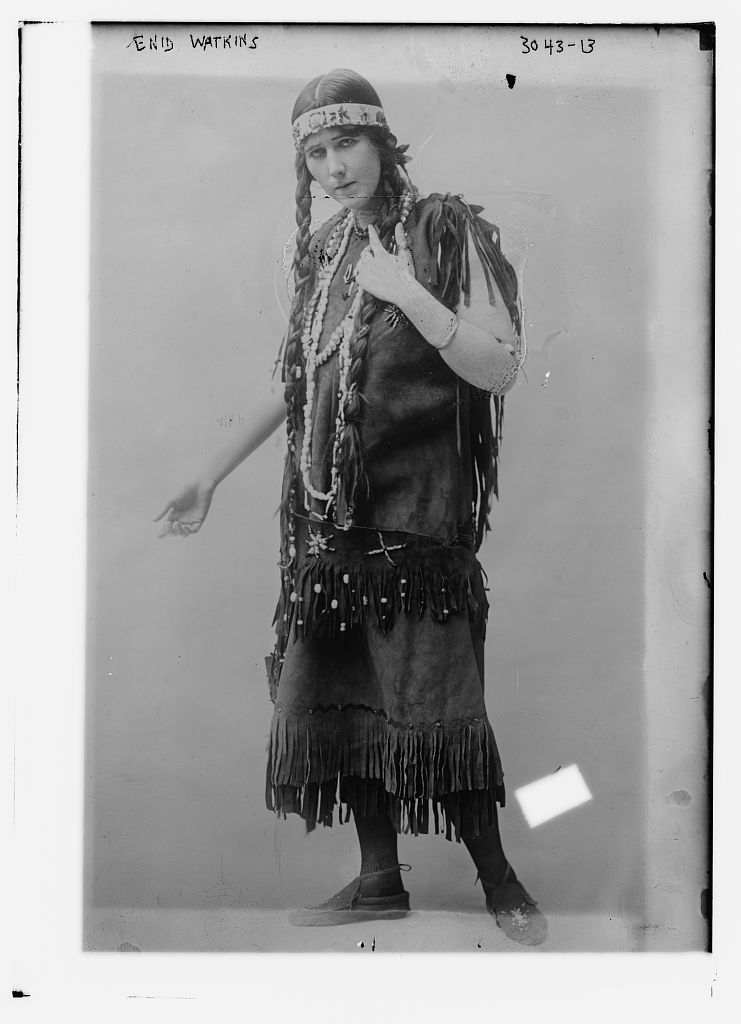

Enid Watkins (July 23, 1890 – January 5, 1971), was a soprano singer, and a dancer who performed Native American dance in the 1910s.

She was born in Chicago, Illinois, to William Watkins and Sara Jane Leonard.

According to her Associated Press obituary, she performed in opera companies in New York, San Francisco and France between 1917 and 1932. She was also a founder and co-chairperson of the Los Angeles Philharmonic Orchestra.

She married Armin Degener. She died in California.
