= Ian Watkins (disambiguation) =

Ian Watkins (1977–2025) was the Welsh lead vocalist for the former rock band Lostprophets and convicted child sex offender.

Ian Watkins may also refer to:

- Ian Watkins (rugby union) (born 1963), Wales international rugby player
- Ian "H" Watkins (born 1976), Welsh performer, member of pop group Steps

== See also ==
- Ian Watkin (1940–2016), New Zealand actor known for the films Braindead and Sleeping Dogs
