= Michael Watkins (zoologist) =

British shipbroker and zoologist

Michael Watkins is a British shipbroker and zoologist. He is known for his books about the eponyms of species.

Watkins is co-author of the books Whose Bird?: Men and Women Commemorated in the Common Names of Birds, The Eponym Dictionary of Mammals, The Eponym Dictionary of Reptiles, The Eponym Dictionary of Amphibians, and The Eponym Dictionary of Birds.

The book Whose Bird? details more than 4,000 people who have been commemorated with common names of birds and was originally conceived as a method of raising money for the Disabled Birders Association.

== Publications ==
- Beolens, B. & Watkins, M. (2003). Whose Bird?: Men and women commemorated in the common names of birds. Eastbourne, United Kingdom: Gardners Books. 400 pp. ISBN 978-0713666472.
- Beolens, B., Watkins, M. & Grayson, M. (2009). The Eponym Dictionary of Mammals. Baltimore: Johns Hopkins University Press. 592 pp. ISBN 978-0801893049.
- Beolens, B., Watkins, M. & Grayson, M. (2011). The Eponym Dictionary of Reptiles. Baltimore: Johns Hopkins University Press. xiii + 296 pp. ISBN 978-1-4214-0135-5.
- Beolens, B., Watkins, M. & Grayson, M. (2013). The Eponym Dictionary of Amphibians. Exeter, England: Pelagic Publishing Ltd. xiii + 244 pp. ISBN 978-1-907807-41-1.
- Beolens, B., Watkins, M. & Grayson, M. (2014). The Eponym Dictionary of Birds. London: Bloomsbury Publishing. 624 pp. ISBN 978-1472905734.
