= Sammy Watkins (musician) =

American musician

Sammy Watkins was the leader of the Sammy Watkins Orchestra, popular during the late 1920s, 1930s and 1940s. He continued to lead a band, based primarily in Cleveland, into the 1960s. The band's longest engagement was at Hollenden Hotel's Vogue Room in Cleveland, Ohio. Musicians included Norbert Kuenzel, drummer Fred Borgerhoff and trumpeters "Scat" Davis and Robert H. Shelley.

During the early 1940s, a young man going by the name of Dino Martini was the band's male vocalist. At Watkins's urging, Martini dropped the ‘i’ in his stage name and subsequently became a star in the United States under his new stage name, Dean Martin.

Watkins sued Martin in July 1950 for unpaid royalties, claiming that he had only been given $1,000 since 1943 when Martin was supposed to give him 10% of his earnings ― totalling $335,594 ― as Watkins had been Martin's agent during this period. Martin had filed for bankruptcy in January 1949.
