= Frederick Watkins (Royal Navy officer) =

Royal Navy Admiral (1770–1856)

Frederick Watkins (14 October 1770 – 10 November 1856) was an officer of the British Royal Navy.

By 1793 he was first lieutenant on the 32-gun frigate HMS Blanche, serving in the Leeward Islands. On 5 January 1795 the captain, Robert Faulknor, was killed during a sea-fight with the French frigate Pique off Pointe-à-Pitre, and command devolved on Watkins, who continued the action. Pique was boarded by Lieutenant David Milne and captured. For his part in the action Watkins was promoted to post captain on 26 April 1795, commanding the 28-gun HMS Resource.

For the next two years Watkins cruised in Resource on the Leeward Islands and Jamaica stations. On 10 December 1796 Resource, with HMS Mermaid, captured the French corvette Général Leveau off San Domingo. In the spring of 1799 he became captain of the 36-gun HMS Nereide. In the Bay of Biscay on 2 March 1800 Nereide captured the French privateer Vengeance, and on 3 March recaptured an American ship with cargo valued at £30,000. Watkins returned to the West Indies in Nereide the same year, and helped to prevent the French capture of the Dutch colony of Curaçao, accepting the island's capitulation to the British. He returned to England in February 1801.

In early 1808 Watkins was appointed to the 74-gun HMS Majestic, but was subsequently court-martialled and dismissed from his command for "a breach of naval discipline" towards Admiral Wells. In 1809 he published The Young Naval Hero; or Hints to Parents and Guardians on the Subject of Educating and Preparing Young Gentlemen for His Majesty's Navy. Watkins was superannuated as a Rear-Admiral on 11 June 1814.

Frederick Watkins came out of retirement on 12 November 1840, when he was transferred to the active list as an Admiral of the Blue. He was further promoted to Admiral of the White on 23 November 1841 and Admiral of the Red on 20 November 1846. On 1 July 1851 Admiral Watkins was transferred to the Reserve Half-Pay List, with a pension of £150 a year.

== See also ==
- O'Byrne, William Richard (1849). "Watkins, Frederick" . A Naval Biographical Dictionary . John Murray – via Wikisource.
