= Alfred Ernest Watkins =

Welsh footballer

Ernest Watkins
Personal information
- Full name: Alfred Ernest Watkins
- Date of birth: 26 June 1878
- Place of birth: Llanwnnog, Wales
- Date of death: 7 December 1957 (aged 79)
- Place of death: Barking, England
- Position: Inside forward

Senior career*
Years	Team	Apps	(Gls)
1894–1895	Caersws		
1895–1897	Oswestry		
1897–1899	Leicester Fosse	31	(12)
1899–1901	Aston Villa	1	(0)
1901	Grimsby Town	11	(5)
1901–1906	Millwall Athletic		
1906–190?	Southend United		

International career
1898–1904	Wales	5	(0)
- * Club domestic league appearances and goals

Alfred Ernest Watkins (26 June 1878 – 7 December 1957), also known as Fred Watkins, was a Welsh international footballer who played as an inside-forward or winger.

Watkins played club football for Leicester Fosse, Aston Villa, Grimsby Town and Millwall Athletic. In 1906, he signed to play in Southend United's inaugural season in the Southern League.

He was part of the Wales national football team between 1898 and 1904, playing five matches. He played his first match on 19 March 1898 against Scotland and his last match on 21 March 1904 against Ireland.

His younger brother, Walter Watkins, also played professional football.

== See also ==
- List of Wales international footballers (alphabetical)
