= Eric Watkins (philosopher) =

American philosopher

- Born: 1964 (age 61–62)
- Awards: Humboldt Fellowship

Academic background
- Education: University of Notre Dame (PhD)
- Thesis: Kant’s Third Analogy of Experience (1994)
- Doctoral advisor: Karl Ameriks

Academic work
- Era: 21st-century philosophy
- Region: Western philosophy
- Institutions: University of California, San Diego, Virginia Tech, Yale University
- Main interests: Kantian philosophy

Eric Watkins (born 1964) is an American philosopher and Professor at the University of California, San Diego. He is known for his works on Kantian philosophy.

== Books ==
- Eric Watkins, Kant on Laws, Cambridge University Press, 2019
- Kant’s Theory of Biology, edited with Ina Goy, De Gruyter, 2014
- Eric Watkins (ed.), The Divine Order, the Human Order, and the Order of Nature: Historical Perspectives, Oxford University Press, 2013
- Immanuel Kant, Natural Science, Eric Watkins (ed.), Lewis Beck, Jeffrey Edwards, Olaf Reinhardt, Martin Schönfeld, and Eric Watkins (trs.), Cambridge University Press, 2012
- Eric Watkins (ed., tr.), Kant's Critique of Pure Reason: Background Source Materials, Cambridge University Press, 2009
- Eric Watkins, Kant and the Metaphysics of Causality, Cambridge University Press, 2005
- Eric Watkins (ed.), Kant and the Sciences, Oxford University Press, 2000
