= Half Man Half Biscuit discography =

- Studio albums: 16
- Extended plays: 5
- Compilation albums: 2
- Singles: 6

This is the discography of English rock band Half Man Half Biscuit.

== Albums ==
=== Studio albums ===
Title	Album details	Peak chart positions		
Title	Album details	UK	UK Indie	SCO
Back in the DHSS	Released: December 1985; Label: Probe Plus; Formats: LP, MC	60	1	—
Back Again in the DHSS	Released: February 1987; Label: Probe Plus; Formats: LP, MC	59	2	—
McIntyre, Treadmore and Davitt	Released: October 1991; Label: Probe Plus; Formats: CD, LP, MC	—	—	—
This Leaden Pall	Released: 25 October 1993; Label: Probe Plus; Formats: CD, LP, MC	—	—	—
Some Call It Godcore	Released: 15 May 1995; Label: Probe Plus; Formats: CD, LP, MC	—	—	—
Voyage to the Bottom of the Road	Released: 18 July 1997; Label: Probe Plus; Formats: CD, LP	—	—	—
Four Lads Who Shook the Wirral	Released: 29 June 1998; Label: Probe Plus; Formats: CD, LP	—	27	—
Trouble over Bridgwater	Released: 25 April 2000; Label: Probe Plus; Formats: CD	—	48	—
Cammell Laird Social Club	Released: 23 September 2002; Label: Probe Plus; Formats: CD	—	—	—
Achtung Bono	Released: 12 September 2005; Label: Probe Plus; Formats: CD	—	—	—
CSI:Ambleside	Released: 28 April 2008; Label: Probe Plus; Formats: CD	123	10	83
90 Bisodol (Crimond)	Released: 26 September 2011; Label: Probe Plus; Formats: CD	85	14	88
Urge for Offal	Released: 20 October 2014; Label: Probe Plus; Formats: CD, LP, digital download	68	13	81
No-One Cares About Your Creative Hub So Get Your Fuckin' Hedge Cut	Released: 18 May 2018; Label: Probe Plus; Formats: CD, LP, digital download	33	7	16
The Voltarol Years	Released: 25 February 2022; Label: R. M. Qualtrough; Formats: CD, LP, digital download	37	5	10
All Asimov and No Fresh Air	Released: 13 June 2025; Label: R. M. Qualtrough; Formats: CD, LP, digital download	64	4	8
"—" denotes releases that did not chart.

=== Compilation albums ===
Title	Album details	Peak chart positions
Title	Album details	UK Indie
ACD	Released: 1989; Label: Probe Plus; Formats: CD	—
And Some Fell on Stony Ground	Released: 21 October 2016; Label: Probe Plus; Formats: CD	34
"—" denotes releases that did not chart.

== EPs ==
Title	EP details	Peak chart positions	
Title	EP details	UK	UK Indie
The Trumpton Riots	Released: March 1986; Label: Probe Plus; Formats: 12"	82	1
The Peel Sessions	Released: October 1988; Label: Strange Fruit; Formats: 12", CD, MC	—	18
Eno Collaboration	Released: August 1996; Label: Probe Plus; Formats: CD	—	—
Editor's Recommendation	Released: 25 June 2001; Label: Probe Plus; Formats: CD	—	—
Saucy Haulage Ballads	Released: 4 August 2003; Label: Probe Plus; Formats: CD	—	37 (Note: Saucy Haulage Ballads charted on the UK Independent Albums Chart.)
"—" denotes releases that did not chart.

== Singles ==
Title	Year	Peak chart positions		Album
Title	Year	UK	UK Indie	Album
"The Trumpton Riots"	1986	99	1	Back Again in the DHSS
"Dickie Davies Eyes"	1986	86	1	Back Again in the DHSS
"No Regrets" (with Margi Clarke)	1991	—	—	Non-album single
"Look Dad No Tunes"	1999	—	—	Trouble over Bridgwater
"Alehouse Futsal"	2018	—	—	No One Cares About Your Creative Hub so Get Your Fuckin' Hedge Cut
"Rogation Sunday's Here Again!"	2022	—	—	The Voltarol Years
"Horror Clowns are Dickheads"	2025	—	—	All Asimov and No Fresh Air
"—" denotes releases that did not chart.

== Other charted songs ==
Title	Year	Peak chart positions			Album
Title	Year	UK	UK Indie	SCO	Album
"Joy Division Oven Gloves" (Note: "Joy Division Oven Gloves" charted as part of an online campaign to save BBC Radio 6 Music.)	2010	56	3	62	Achtung Bono

== Miscellaneous tracks ==
- "David Wainwright's Feet"; on the charity album Colours Are Brighter (2006)
