= 1966 and All That =

1966 and All That may refer to:

- 1966 and All That (book), a 2005 book by satirist Craig Brown
- 1966 and All That (radio), radio adaptation of the above book
- 1966 and All That, a 1986 art exhibit at the Whitworth Art Gallery
- 1966 and All That, a 2001 autobiography of soccer player Geoff Hurst
- "1966 and All That", a 1986 song by the band Half Man Half Biscuit on The Trumpton Riots EP

== See also ==
- 1066 and All That, a satirical 1930 history book
