= Dickie Davies Eyes =

Single by Half Man Half Biscuit
- Released: 1986
- Recorded: 1986
- Studio: The Cottage, Macclesfield
- Genre: Post-punk
- Length: 4:26
- Label: Probe Plus PP21
- Producer: The Bald Brothers

Half Man Half Biscuit singles chronology
"Trumpton Riots EP (TRUMP1)" (1986)	"Dickie Davies Eyes" (1986)	"Trumpton Riots (TRUMX1)" (1986)

Official audio
- "Dickie Davis Eyes" on YouTube

"Dickie Davies Eyes" is a 1986 single by the English indie band Half Man Half Biscuit. The song title parodies the song title of the 1981 Kim Carnes single "Bette Davis Eyes" and refers to Dickie Davies, a UK television presenter, notable for presenting World of Sport from the late 1960s until 1985.

The single was produced by The Bald Brothers (Geoff Davies and Sam Davis) and engineered by Roger Boden.

The 7" single B-side was "I Left My Heart in Papworth General" while the 12" EP additionally featured "The Bastard Son of Dean Friedman". The song was later included on the album Back Again in the DHSS.

It was subsequently re-released on the compact disc ACD in 1989.

The song reached number 86 in the UK Singles Chart in October 1986, and reached number 1 in the UK Indie chart. Sometime following the death of Dickie Davies in 2023, it subsequently entered the Official Charts at number 32 for one week, in August 2023.

== Cultural references ==
The song lyrics make many references to UK popular culture from the 1970s and 1980s, and earlier, in particular British sporting references, or fantasy literature, including,

- The Lord of the Rings fantasy trilogy by J. R. R. Tolkien
- Michael Moorcock a British author of science fiction and fantasy novels
- Football commentator Brian Moore
- Roger Dean, an artist working predominantly in the fantasy genre from the late 1960s and later, responsible for many notable posters, album and book covers
- The UK Cadbury's Flake adverts, which generally included sensual footage of a young woman eating a flake
- Dickie Davies himself

The song continues the theme of including references to football or various sports commentators by the band, as in for instance "The Len Ganley Stance" from their album Back in the DHSS and the songs "1966 and All That" and "All I Want for Christmas is a Dukla Prague Away Kit" from The Trumpton Riots EP.
