= Richard Armour =

American writer

Richard Willard Armour (July 15, 1906 – February 28, 1989) was an American poet and prose writer who wrote more than 65 books.

== Life and works ==
Armour was born in San Pedro, Los Angeles, California, the only child of Harry W. and Sue Wheelock Armour. His father was a druggist, and Armour's autobiographical Drug Store Days recalls his childhood in both San Pedro and Pomona. He attended Pomona College and Harvard University, where he studied with the eminent Shakespearean scholar George Lyman Kittredge and obtained a Ph.D. in English philology. He was married to Kathleen Stevens and they had two children, Geoffrey and Karin, and he eventually became Professor of English at Scripps College and the Claremont Graduate School in Claremont, California. In 1968, Armour was awarded an honorary Doctor of Humane Letters (L.H.D.) degree from Whittier College.

In his early career he focused on serious literature, publishing (in 1935) a biography of the lesser English poet Bryan Waller Procter and in 1940, co-editing (with Raymond F. Howes) a series of observations by contemporaries about Samuel Taylor Coleridge, Coleridge the Talker. Virginia Woolf cited this work in an essay stating, "Two pious American editors have collected the comments of this various company [Coleridge's acquaintances], and they are, of course, various. Yet it is the only way of getting at the truth—to have it broken into many splinters by many mirrors and so select."

Armour wrote humorous poems—light verse—in a style reminiscent of Ogden Nash. These poems were often featured in newspaper Sunday supplements in a feature called Armour's Armory. Many of Armour's poems have been repeatedly and incorrectly attributed to Nash. Probably Armour's most-quoted poem (often incorrectly attributed to Nash) is the quatrain: "Shake and shake / the catsup bottle / none will come / and then a lot'll." Another popular quatrain of his, also usually attributed erroneously to Nash, is: "Nothing attracts / the mustard from wieners / as much as the slacks / just back from the cleaners."

Armour also wrote satirical books, such as Twisted Tales from Shakespeare, and his ersatz history of the United States, It All Started With Columbus. These books were typically filled with puns and plays on words, and gave the impression of someone who had not quite been paying attention in class, thus also getting basic facts not quite right, to humorous effect.

As an example: "In an attempt to take Baltimore, the British attacked Fort McHenry, which protected the harbor. Bombs were soon bursting in air, rockets were glaring, and all in all it was a moment of great historical interest. During the bombardment, a young lawyer named Francis "Off" Key wrote The Star-Spangled Banner, and when, by the dawn's early light, the British heard it sung, they fled in terror."

It All Started with Europa begins in the wilderness full of "fierce animals ready to spring and fierce birds ready to chirp."

It All Started with Marx includes the rabble-rousing Vladimir Lenin declaring in public "Two pants with every suit!," "Two suits with every pants!" and "The Tsar is a tsap!"

It All started with Eve quotes Napoleon as writing in a letter "Do you [ Joséphine ] miss me? I hope the enemy artillery does."

His book The Classics Reclassified includes take-offs on works such as The Iliad, Julius Caesar by William Shakespeare, David Copperfield by Charles Dickens, etc.; each take-off is prefaced by a short biography of the work's author in the same style. For Shakespeare, it says he "was baptized April 26, 1564. When he was born is disputed, but anyone who argues that it was after this date is just being difficult."

Armour's books are typically written in a style parodying dull academic tomes, with many footnotes (funny in themselves), fake bibliographies, quiz sections, and glossaries. This style was pioneered by the British humorists W. C. Sellar and R. J. Yeatman with their parody of British history 1066 and All That in the 1930s.

A preface of one book noted "The reader will not encounter any half-truths, but may occasionally encounter a truth-and-a-half."

== Bibliography ==
=== Books ===
Title	Year	Subject/Notes
Barry Cornwall: A Biography of Bryan Waller Procter	1935	Bryan Waller Procter
The Literary Recollections of Barry Cornwall	1936	Bryan Waller Procter
Coleridge the Talker	1940	Co-edited with Raymond F. Howes
To These Dark Steps	1943	Stage play (life of John Milton), with Bown Adams
Writing Light Verse	1947	
It All Started with Columbus	1953	American history
It All Started with Europa	1955	European history
It All Started with Eve	1956	History of women
Twisted Tales from Shakespeare	1957	Parody
It All Started with Marx	1958	History of communism
Drug Store Days	1959	Autobiography
The Classics Reclassified	1960	Famous books (parody)
Pills, Potions and Granny	1960	
A Safari into Satire	1961	
Armour's Almanac; or, Around the Year in 365 Days	1962	
Golf is a Four-Letter Word	1962	
Through Darkest Adolescence	1963	Humorous "advice" for dealing with teenagers
AmericanLit Relit	1964	American literature
Our Presidents	1964	Children's book, illustrated by Leonard Everett Fisher, Woodbridge Press, California ISBN 0-88007-134-6
The Year Santa Went Modern	1964	Children's book
The Adventures of Egbert the Easter Egg	1965	Children's book
Going Around in Academic Circles	1966	Higher education
It All Started with Hippocrates	1966	Medicine
Animals on the Ceiling	1966	Children's book
It All Started with Stones and Clubs	1967	Warfare and weaponry
A Dozen Dinosaurs	1967	Children's book
My Life with Women	1968	
Odd Old Mammals	1968	Children's book
A Diabolical Dictionary of Education	1969	
English Lit Relit	1969	English literature
On Your Marks: A Package of Punctuation	1969	Children's book
A Short History of Sex	1970	
All Sizes and Shapes of Monkeys and Apes	1970	Children's book
Writing Light Verse and Prose Humor	1971	
Who's in Holes?	1971	Children's book
All in Sport	1972	With drawings by Leo Hershfield. New York, McGraw-Hill, ISBN 0-07-002302-6
Out of My Mind	1972	About Bryan Waller Procter/Barry Cornwall
It All Started with Freshman English	1973	
The Strange Dreams of Rover Jones	1973	
The Academic Bestiary	1974	Humorous look at higher learning. William Morrow and Company, Inc., ISBN 0-688-02884-5
Going Like Sixty	1974	Humorous look at aging. McGraw-Hill ISBN 0-07-002291-7
Sea Full of Whales	1974	Children's book, illustrated by Paul Galdone
The Happy Bookers: A History of Librarians and Their World	1976	Librarians. Written with and Campbell Grant
It All Started with Nudes	1977	Art appreciation. Illustrated by Campbell Grant.
Strange Monsters of the Sea	1979	Children's book
Insects All Around Us	1981	Children's book, illustrated by Paul Galdone
Anyone for Insomnia? A Playful Look at Sleeplessness by a blear-eyed insomniac	1982	
Educated Guesses: Light-Serious Suggestions for Parents and Teachers	1983	Education (serious)
Have You Ever Wished You Were Something Else?	1983	Children's book

=== Poetry ===
Collections

- Armour, Richard (1942). Yours for the asking.
- — (1944). Privates' lives.
- — (1946). Golf bawls.
- — (1946). Leading with my left. Caricatures by Joseph Forte.
- — (1950). For partly proud parents.
- — (1954). Light Armour : playful poems on practically everything.
- — (1958). Nights with Armour : lighthearted light verse.
- — (1963). The medical muse, or what to do until the patient comes.
- — (1964). An armoury of light verse.
- — (1975). The spouse in the house.

Anthologies (edited)

- Armour, Richard, ed. (1966). Punctured poems : famous first and infamous second lines. Illustrated by Eric Gurney.

List of poems

Title	Year	First published	Reprinted/collected
To man, gloomily	1950	Armour, Richard (January 7, 1950). "To man, gloomily". The New Yorker. Vol. 25, no. 46. p. 71.	

== Appearance on You Bet Your Life ==
In 1957, Armour appeared on the television game show You Bet Your Life. After introductions, host Groucho Marx repeated the show's famous catch-phrase, "Say the secret word, win a hundred dollars." Each episode of the show had a secret, common word (e.g. home, head, door) and if the contestant said the word during his/her interview, then the partnered contestants would each get $50. In this particular case, Armour caught the host in a semantic trap, by immediately stating, "The secret word." He then demanded his $100. After a very brief moment of confusion the band broke out with a short medley indicating that the secret word had been said. Announcer and assistant George Fenneman then arrived on camera and turned to Armour, "From the C.O. over here that we will allow you to do what you just did. But nobody else better try this. That's what they said." Armour replied, "Thank you, very much." And Fenneman left the frame and responded, "You're welcome," quickly caught himself, and almost cut himself off stating, "I had nothing to do with it." Normally when the secret word is said, Groucho immediately hands over cash. He did not hand over the cash and it's unclear if they paid Armour the bonus even after Armour and his partner won the game. He also composed the following poem that he read to Groucho.

To Groucho

Most poets write of Meadowlarks
I sing instead of Groucho Marx
His lustrous eyes, each like a star
His noble brow, his sweet cigar
His manly stride, his soft moustache
His easy way with sponsors' cash
His massive shoulders, brawny arms
His intellect, his many charms
In short, unless the truth I stray from
A man to keep your wife away from.

He also recited a couple of other humorous poems on the program.
