= Let's Not (song) =

Single by Half Man Half Biscuit
- B-side: "Our Tune", "Ordinary to Enschede"
- Released: 1990
- Genre: Indie rock
- Length: 9:53
- Label: Probe Plus PP26
- Producer: Bald Brothers

Half Man Half Biscuit singles chronology
"Dickie Davies Eyes" (1986)	"Let's Not" (1990)	"No Regrets" (1991)

"Let's Not" is a single released in 1990 on vinyl and CD by the Wirral-based British band Half Man Half Biscuit. It was their first release after reforming as a four-piece, the original band having been a five-piece. It was released as a 7-inch single with "Our Tune" on the B-side, and as a 12-inch single and CD single with the extra track "Ordinary to Enschede".

1. "Let's Not" (3:39)
2. "Our Tune" (2:51)
3. "Ordinary to Enschede" (3:23)

The songs "Let's Not" and "Our Tune" were subsequently included on the 1991 studio album McIntyre, Treadmore and Davitt. As of April 2015, "Ordinary to Enschede" has been released only on the CD version of the single.

The upper part of the cover art is the upper part of Dutch artist Vincent Van Gogh's 1889 painting The Starry Night.

== Cultural references ==
As is common with Half Man Half Biscuit, the songs contain multiple cultural references and allusions. For "Let's Not" and "Our Tune", see the article McIntyre, Treadmore and Davitt. Those identified in "Ordinary to Enschede" include:

- A journey by various means of transport: by barge to Waregem in Belgium, by ordinary to Enschede in the Netherlands, by hydrofoil to Malmö in Sweden, and by the last bus to her heart.
- German playwright Berthold Brecht.
- J. D. Salinger's 1951 novel The Catcher in the Rye.
- The game Naked Twister.
