= Ready Steady Go =

Ready Steady Go may refer to:

== Television ==
- Ready Steady Go!, a 1963–1966 British music TV programme
- Ready Steady Go (Pakistani TV series), a 2017–2020 sitcom
- "Ready, Steady, Go!", an episode of the TV series Pocoyo

== Music ==
- Ready, Steady, Go! (album), by Drake Bell, 2014
- "Ready Steady Go" (L'Arc-en-Ciel song), 2004
- "Ready, Steady, Go!", a song by Harry Styles from the 2026 album Kiss All the Time. Disco, Occasionally
- "Ready Steady Go", a song by Nami Tamaki from the 2006 album Speciality
- "Ready Steady Go", a 1978 song by Generation X, from the 1978 album Generation X
- "Southern Sun"/"Ready Steady Go", by Oakenfold, 2002

== See also ==
- "Ready Steady Goa", a song by Half Man Half Biscuit from the 1998 album Four Lads Who Shook the Wirral
