= ACD (album) =

Compilation album by Half Man Half Biscuit
- Released: 1989
- Genre: Indie rock
- Length: 53:41
- Label: Probe Plus Probe 8

Half Man Half Biscuit chronology
Back Again in the DHSS (1988)	ACD (1989)	McIntyre, Treadmore and Davitt (1991)

Professional ratings
Review scores
Source	Rating
Allmusic	4/5 stars

ACD was the first CD from Half Man Half Biscuit. It is essentially a much expanded version of the previous vinyl album, Back Again in the DHSS.

== Track listing ==
1. "The Best Things In Life"
2. "D'Ye Ken Ted Moult?"
3. "Reasons To Be Miserable (Part 10)"
4. "Rod Hull Is Alive – Why?"
5. "Dickie Davies Eyes"
6. "The Bastard Son Of Dean Friedman"
7. "I Was A Teenage Armchair Honved Fan"
8. "Arthur's Farm"
9. "Carry On Cremating"
10. "Albert Hammond Bootleg (live)"
11. "Reflections In A Flat (live)"
12. "Sealclubbing (live)"
13. "Architecture and Morality, Ted and Alice (live)"
14. "Fuckin' 'Ell It's Fred Titmus (live)"
15. "Time Flies By (When You're The Driver Of A Train) (live)"
16. "All I Want For Christmas Is A Dukla Prague Away Kit (live)"
17. "The Trumpton Riots (live)"
