= Saucy Haulage Ballads =

EP by Half Man Half Biscuit
- Released: 4 August 2003
- Recorded: 2003
- Studio: F.R.O.G. Studios, Warrington
- Genre: Post-punk
- Length: 18:55
- Label: Probe Plus PP35
- Producer: Local schoolchildren

Half Man Half Biscuit chronology
Cammell Laird Social Club (2002)	Saucy Haulage Ballads (2003)	Achtung Bono (2005)

Professional ratings
Review scores
Source	Rating
Stylus Magazine	A-

Saucy Haulage Ballads is an extended play CD released by the Birkenhead-based British group Half Man Half Biscuit in August 2003. A reviewer in Stylus Magazine remarked: "Saucy Haulage Ballads may only be a six-track EP, but it contains more ideas, insight and moments than most bands could manage in an entire career."

According to English writer Julie Burchill, the lyrics of "Blood on the Quad" have a "pleasing whiff" of the finale of Lindsay Anderson's 1968 film if.....

== Track listing ==
No.	Title	Length
1.	"Jarg Armani"	3:02
2.	"Tending the Wrong Grave for 23 Years"	3:44
3.	"It Makes the Room Look Bigger"	3:14
4.	"On Finding the Studio Banjo"	3:30
5.	"Blood on the Quad"	2:08
6.	"I Went to a Wedding..."	3:17

== Notes ==
- "Jarg" is a Merseyside slang word meaning "fake", sometimes applied to knock-off goods.
- Armani is an Italian fashion house.
- "On Finding the Studio Banjo" is a reworking of Half Man Half Biscuit's 1986 song "The Trumpton Riots", in a bluegrass style with banjo accompaniment.
- A quad is a courtyard, often at one of the older English universities.
- The title "I Went to a Wedding..." parodies that of the 1952 song "I Went to Your Wedding".
