= Lorilei =

2003 play

Lorilei: A Meditation on Loss
- Written by: Tom Wright; Nicholas Harrington
- Based on: Trial transcripts
- Characters: Lorilei Guillory
- Original language: English
- Subject: Morality of capital punishment
- Genre: Monodrama

Premiere
- Date premiered: 2003
- Place premiered: Australia

Lorilei: A Meditation on Loss is a 2003 play by Tom Wright and Nicholas Harrington, based on a capital murder trial in Louisiana, United States.

== Theme ==
The play tells the true story of Lorilei Guillory, whose six-year-old son, Jeremy, was murdered in 1992 in Iowa, Louisiana, by a man with schizophrenia. During the second trial of the man convicted of the crime, Ricky Langley, Guillory testified for the defendant, stating her opinion that he was mentally ill at the time of the offence and should not be sentenced to die. The retrial ended in a verdict of diminished capacity, rather than the original death sentence.

A solo performance, the play is presented as a narrative constructed from the transcripts of the trial. It explores Guillory's struggle with the loss of her young child but also her compassion for the man who killed him.

== Staging and reception ==
First staged in 2003 in Australia, the play has been presented around the world including at the Edinburgh Fringe in 2005. Reviewing the 2005 London staging at The Old Red Lion, Guardian critic Michael Billington gave the play four stars out of five, calling it an "extraordinary evening" and explaining that, after watching the play and listening to an after-show discussion, "one comes to understand how it is possible for mercy to triumph over revenge." An adaptation for radio by BBC Radio 4 won the 2007 Sony Radio Award for Drama.

In 2014, the Justice Project Pakistan commissioned an Urdu translation of the play. A company toured Pakistan presenting the English and Urdu versions on alternating dates. The News International praised actor Nimra Bucha for her performance in English and described the story as deliberately slow-paced but "instantly gripping". Reviewing Sania Saeed's performance of the Urdu version, Dawn said she showed "the kind of emotional investment in the script which makes art reflect life".
