= A Song for Europe (disambiguation) =

A Song for Europe is the former name of the British pre-selection competition for the Eurovision Song Contest, now known as Eurovision: You Decide.

A Song for Europe may also refer to:

- Malta Song for Europe, the Maltese national pre-selection competition for the Eurovision Song Contest
- "A Song for Europe", a song from Roxy Music's 1973 album Stranded
- "Song for Europe", a song by Half Man Half Biscuit on the 1995 album Some Call It Godcore
- A Song for Europe, a 1985 British TV film with David Suchet, based on the real-life experience of corporate whistle-blower Stanley Adams
- "A Song for Europe" (Father Ted), an episode of the sitcom Father Ted
- "Here Is My Song for Europe", a song from Denim's 1992 album Back in Denim
