= Picnic at Hanging Rock =

Picnic at Hanging Rock may refer to:

- Picnic at Hanging Rock (novel), a 1967 novel by Joan Lindsay
  - Picnic at Hanging Rock (film), a 1975 film adaptation of the novel, directed by Peter Weir
  - Picnic at Hanging Rock, a 2016 theatre adaptation by Tom Wright (Australian playwright)
  - Picnic at Hanging Rock (TV series), a 2018 television adaptation
