= Joanna (band) =

Musical group from the North West of England

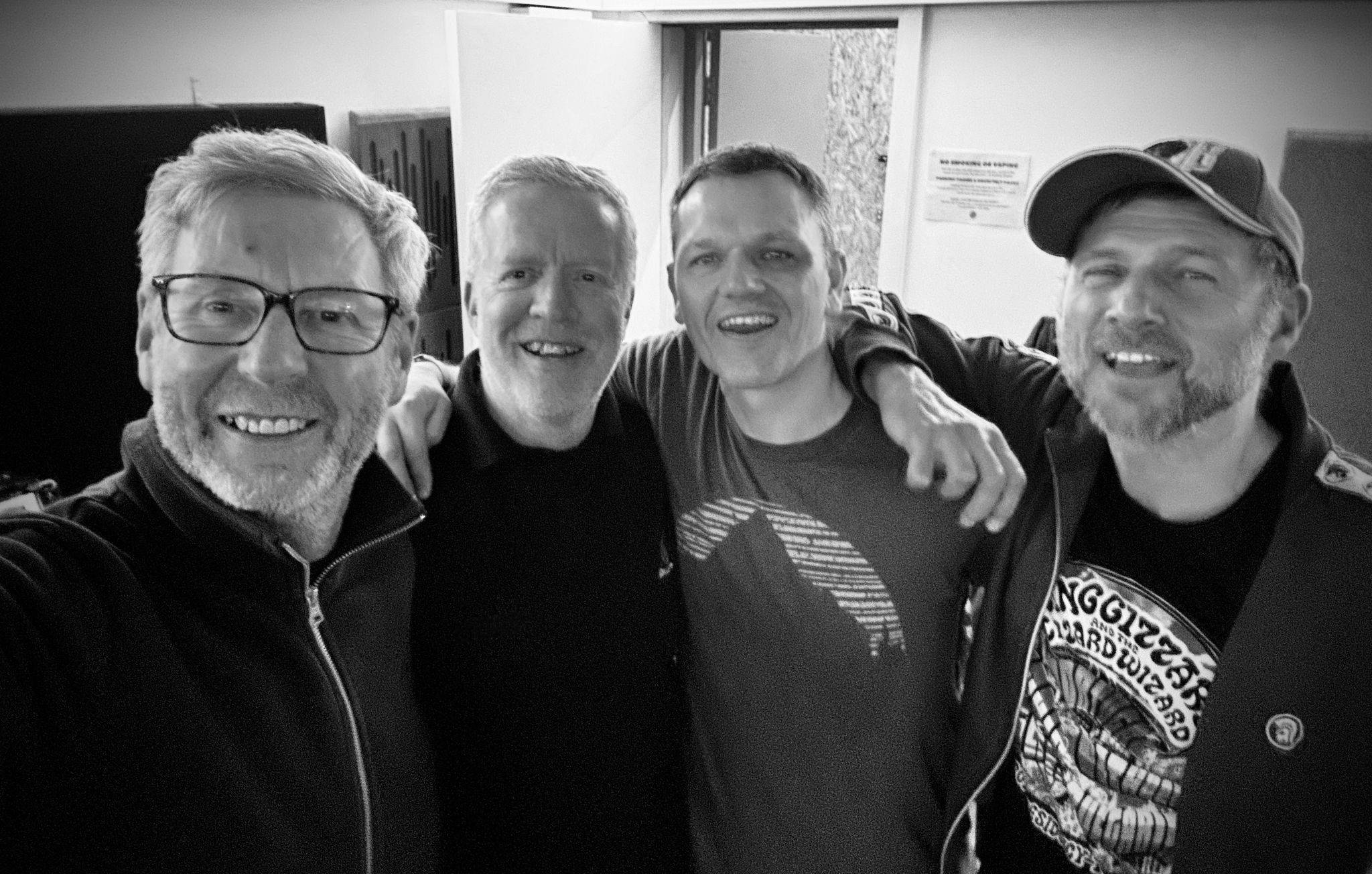
- Joanna in 2025 (L–R): Tyrone Holt, Neil Holliday, Carl Alty, Terry Lloyd

Background information
- Origin: Widnes, England
- Genres: Indie Rock
- Years active: 1989 - 1991, 2025 - Present
- Members: Neil Holliday; Terry Lloyd; Tyrone Holt; Carl Alty

Joanna are an indie guitar band from the North West of England, consisting of Neil Holliday (vocals), Terry Lloyd (bass), Tyrone Holt (guitar) and Carl Alty (drums).

== History ==
Joanna formed in the North West of England in 1989, emerging in the peak of the Madchester era. The band was created when drummer Carl Alty, a student at Leigh Music College, was invited to audition for a group that bass player Terry Lloyd was in. After a few months the original group split, Lloyd recruited a colleague from Runcorn, vocalist Neil Holliday, while Alty brought in a friend from Leigh Music College, guitarist Tyrone Holt. The band's name derived from its first song, "I Wanna Marry Joanna."

Rehearsing twice weekly, the band recorded most of its material at Pentagon Studios in Widnes, before moving to Strawberry Studios in Stockport owned by 10cc, where acts such as The Stone Roses, New Order and The Smiths had also recorded. The band built a following across the North West through live performances, supporting acts including Shack and Dr. Phibes and the House of Wax Equations. The group played in notable venues such as The Boardwalk, The Ritz and International 1 in Manchester, as well as The Venue in New Cross, London. Joanna attracted many potential record labels, including correspondence from Factory Records and Rough Trade, leading NME to describe them as "the most popular band without a record out." However, citing the shifting music landscape of the early 1990s music scene, Joanna disbanded without releasing any material.All the members continued to perform in groups on-and-off over the years with Alty also later playing in Merseyside band Half Man Half Biscuit, and Northern Irish group Joyrider.

More than three decades later, a friend of the band members rediscovered the original quarter-inch reel tapes in a plastic bag while clearing a loft. The tapes were restored by Manchester Restoration Audio, then mastered in Los Angeles. The recordings came to the attention of Jesse Kivel, a friend of Alty’s from his time spent playing in the band Kisses, who arranged for them to be released through his label New Feelings. The completed album, Hello Flower, was released on all streaming platforms and on vinyl in December 2025.

== Discography ==
=== Albums ===
- "Hello Flower" - 5 December 2025

=== Singles ===
- "Gardeners' World" - 20 October 2025
- "If You Don't Want Me To" - 27 October 2025
- "Bandit Country" - 18 November 2025

=== Remixes ===
- "Gardeners' World - ddwy Remix" (2026)
- "If You Don't Want Me To - Andras Remix" (2026)
