= Joyrider (band) =

Northern Irish band

Joyrider were a rock band from Portadown, Northern Ireland. The band consisted of Phil Woolsey (guitar, vocals), Cliff Mitchell (guitar), Simon Haddock (bass) and Keith Irwin, Buc Hamill / Carl Alty (drums). Joyrider initially signed to Andy Cairns' Blunt record label, but after releasing their first two EPs signed a recording contract with Paradox Records.

The band's biggest hit is a pop-punk cover of the Jane Wiedlin song "Rush Hour". They supported Terrorvision on their May 1995 United Kingdom tour. The same month, the band played the Aberystwyth University May Ball.

Woolsey later played in the bands Ninebar International and Roque Junior and now fronts Papa Luna.

Additionally, Alty, who had previously drummed for Joanna and Half Man Half Biscuit, joined LA-based band Kisses some years later.

Haddock is now a member of Trucker Diablo, who played at the Download Festival in June 2011, toured with Black Stone Cherry and were booked for Hammerfest in March 2012 on the same bill as Anthrax, Skindred and Evile.

== Discography ==
=== Studio album ===
- Be Special (1996)

=== EPs ===
- Dweeb King (1994)
- Getting That Joke Now (1994)
- Seven Sisters (1995)
- It Moved (1995)

=== Singles ===
- "Self Infliction" (1995)
- "Fabulae" (1995)
- "Vegetable Animal Mineral" (1996)
- "Another Skunk Song" (1996)
- "Rush Hour" (July 1996) - UK No. 22
- "All Gone Away" (September 1996) - UK No. 54
