= 1066 and All That =

1930 book by W. C. Sellar & R. J. Yeatman

- Later paperback edition (c. late 1960s)
- Author: W. C. Sellar and R. J. Yeatman
- Original title: 1066 and All That: A Memorable History of England, Comprising All the Parts You Can Remember, Including 103 Good Things, 5 Bad Kings and 2 Genuine Dates
- Illustrator: John Reynolds; Steven Appleby (75th anniversary edition)
- Language: English
- Genre: Parody
- Publisher: Methuen Publishing
- Publication place: United Kingdom
- English publication date: October 16, 1930
- Media type: Print
- Pages: 172
- ISBN: 978-0-413-77270-1
- OCLC: 51486473
- Followed by: And Now All This

1066 and All That: A Memorable History of England, Comprising All the Parts You Can Remember, Including 103 Good Things, 5 Bad Kings and 2 Genuine Dates is a tongue-in-cheek reworking of the history of England. Written by W. C. Sellar and R. J. Yeatman and illustrated by John Reynolds, it first appeared serially in Punch magazine, and was published in book form by Methuen & Co. Ltd. in 1930.

== Setting and background ==
Raphael Samuel saw 1066 and All That as a product of the post-First World War debunking of British greatness, very much in the tradition of Eminent Victorians (1918): as he put it, "that much underrated anti-imperialist tract 1066 and All That punctured the more bombastic claims of drum-and-trumpet history".

Both the Tory view of a 'great man' history, and the liberal pieties of Whig history are undermined in the work, in the (then contemporary) style of such serious historians as Namier and Herbert Butterfield. With its conflation of history and memory, and its deconstruction of "standard" historical narrative lines, the book can also be seen as an early post-modernist text.

== Overview ==
The book is a parody of the style of history teaching in English schools at the time, in particular of Our Island Story. It purports to contain "all the History you can remember", and, in sixty-two chapters, covers the history of England from Roman times through 1066 "and all that", up to the end of World War I, at which time "America was thus clearly Top Nation, and history came to a .". The book is full of examples of half-remembered and mixed-up facts.

Although the subtitle states that the book comprises "103 Good Things, 5 Bad Kings and 2 Genuine Dates", the book's preface mentions that originally four dates were planned, but last-minute research revealed that two of them were not memorable. The two dates that are referenced in the book are 1066, the date of the Battle of Hastings and the Norman Conquest of England (Chapter XI), and 55 BC, the date of the first Roman invasion of Britain under Julius Caesar (Chapter I). However, when the date of the Roman invasion is given, it is immediately followed by the date that Caesar was "compelled to invade Britain again the following year (54 BC, not 56, owing to the peculiar Roman method of counting)". Despite the confusion of dates the Roman Conquest is the first of 103 historical events in the book characterised as a Good Thing, "since the Britons were only natives at that time".

Chapter II begins "that long succession of Waves of which History is chiefly composed", the first of which, here, is composed of Ostrogoths, Visigoths, mere Goths, Vandals, and Huns. Later examples are the "Wave of Saints", who include the Venomous Bead (Chapter III); "Waves of Pretenders", usually divided into smaller waves of two: an Old Pretender and a Young Pretender (Chapter XXX); plus the "Wave of Beards" in the Elizabethan era (Chapter XXXIII).

According to Sellar and Yeatman, in English history kings are either "Good" or "Bad". The first "Good King" is the confusingly differentiated King Arthur/Alfred (Chapter V). Bad kings include King John, who when he came to the throne showed how much he deserved this epithet when he "lost his temper and flung himself on the floor, foaming at the mouth and biting the rushes" (Chapter XVIII). The death of Henry I from "a surfeit of palfreys" (recorded in other historical works as a "surfeit of lampreys", Chapter XIII) proves to be a paradigmatic case of the deaths of later monarchs through a surfeit of over-eating or other causes (so, for example, in Chapter XVII, Richard the Lion Heart dies "of a surfeit of Saladins"). Other memorable monarchs include the Split King (Henry IV, Part 1 and Henry IV, Part 2) and Broody Mary.

Memorable events in English history include the Disillusion of the Monasteries (Chapter XXXI); the struggle between the Cavaliers (characterised as "Wrong but Wromantic") and the Roundheads (characterised as "Right but Repulsive") in the English Civil War (Chapter XXXV); and The Industrial Revelation (Chapter XLIX).

The book also contains five joke "Test Papers" interspersed among the chapters, which contain nonsense instructions including the famous "Do not on any account attempt to write on both sides of the paper at once" (Test Paper V), and "Do not attempt to answer more than one question at a time" (Test Paper I) and such unanswerable questions as "How far did the Lords Repellent drive Henry III into the arms of Pedro the Cruel? (Protractors may not be used.)" (Test Paper II).

== Musical comedy ==
In 1935, the musical comedy 1066 – and all that: A Musical Comedy based on that Memorable History by Sellar and Yeatman was produced. The book and lyrics were by Reginald Arkell; the music was composed by Alfred Reynolds. It was revived at the Palace Theatre, London, in 1945.

== Works inspired by 1066 ==
1066 and All That inspired Paul Manning's 1984 and All That, dealing with the subsequent history of Britain and the rest of the world up to 1984, and written in the same style, with similar prose, illustrations and tests. ("What caused the Wall Street crash? Speculate wildly.") The title references George Orwell's Nineteen Eighty-Four.

Ned Sherrin and Neil Shand wrote a sequel 1956 and All That, with the subtitle a memorable history of England since the war to end all wars (Two).

In 2005 Craig Brown released 1966 and All That, which copied the book's style (including elements like the end of chapter tests), recounting the remainder of the 20th century. In 2006 the book was adapted for BBC Radio 4 in four parts.

Richard Armour's book It All Started With Columbus (1953, revised 1961) treats the history of the United States, from 1492 to the presidency of John Fitzgerald Kennedy, in a manner that owes a great deal to Sellar and Yeatman ("Ferdinand and Isabella refused to believe the world was round, even when Columbus showed them an egg"). Acknowledging the debt, Armour dedicated his book to Sellar and Yeatman.

Dave Barry's 1989 book Dave Barry Slept Here: A Sort of History of the United States is another treatment of American history reminiscent of 1066 and All That, though Sellar and Yeatman are not acknowledged. ("The first major president to be elected after the War of 1812 was President Monroe Doctrine, who became famous by developing the policy for which he is named.")

Matthew Sturgis' book 1992 and All This (Macmillan, 1991) is a "humorous look at Europe in preparation for 1992 when Britain officially becomes part of the Continent. Much of the humour focuses on the differences between the British and the Europeans."

== Works with titles inspired by 1066 ==
- The title was adapted by Raymond F. Streater and Arthur S. Wightman for their (serious) textbook on axiomatic quantum field theory, PCT, Spin and Statistics, and All That. This in turn influenced the titles of several other books, monographs, and papers on mathematical physics: as of November 2013, a search for "and all that" in the open collection of specialized scientific articles arXiv yields 25 such titles; MathSciNet (Mathematical Reviews online) lists 83 hits for corresponding mathematical papers. There is also an introductory vector calculus text by H. M. Schey called Div, Grad, Curl, and all that.
- In an unconnected area of mathematics (Mathematical Logic), Franz Baader and Tobias Nipkow's 1998 "Term Rewriting and All That" was published by Cambridge University Press.
- The book 3264 and All That: A Second Course in Algebraic Geometry by David Eisenbud and Joe Harris mentions this book as the inspiration for its title.
- Australian cricketer and cartoonist Arthur Mailey had taken all 10 wickets for 66 runs in a first-class match during the 1921 tour of England, and hence titled his 1958 autobiography 10 for 66 And All That.
- Birkenhead band Half Man Half Biscuit featured a song entitled "1966 and All That" on their debut EP The Trumpton Riots.
- Welsh rock band Mclusky recorded the song "1956 and All That" for their third album The Difference Between Me and You Is That I'm Not on Fire.
- 1089 and All That – A Journey into Mathematics is a popular mathematics book by David Acheson.
- Amo, Amas, Amat... and All That: How to Become a Latin Lover by Harry Mount is a guide to (and celebration of) the Latin language.
- In 1992, Robert Royal wrote 1492 And All That: Political Manipulations of History. From the dust jacket: "Spurning the false idealism and bland caricatures of historical actors that distort the arguments of both sides, Robert Royal surveys the available facts and political positions about Columbus and his legacy and seeks to find the truth among them. His provocative analysis recommends a better-balanced reading of our past and a wise use of that base for determining our common future."
- In 2010/11, England won the Ashes series in Australia for the first time since 1986/87. Alastair Cook made 766 runs in that series. The Guardian published their over-by-over blog in a book and titled it 766 and All That.
- In 2025, the first lecture in the annual series of Ford Lectures in British History at the University of Oxford by Jocelyn Wogan-Browne was titled "'Alle mine thegenas ... frencisce & englisce': The Languages of 1066 – And All That".

== See also ==
- Blackadder
- Flanders and Swann
- Horrible Histories
- Monty Python
- Nigel Molesworth
- Richmal Crompton

== Bibliography ==
- W. C. Sellar and R. J. Yeatman (2010). 1066 and All That (2010 new ed.). Methuen. ISBN 978-0-413-77270-1.
- W. C. Sellar and R. J. Yeatman (2004) [1932]. And Now All This: Being Vol.I of The Hole Pocket Treasury of Absolutely General Knowledge. Methuen. ISBN 0-413-77380-9.
