= Tom Wright (Australian playwright) =

Australian theatre writer (born 1968)

Tom Wright (born 1 January 1968) is an Australian theatre writer, mostly known for his adaptations and translations.

== Biography ==
Tom Wright was born and grew up in Melbourne. He studied fine art and English at Melbourne University.

In 2003 he was appointed artistic associate at Sydney Theatre Company (STC); in 2007 he became associate director. He left the company in 2012.

In 2016 he joined Belvoir as an artistic associate.

== Career ==
Wright began as an actor, joining Jean-Pierre Mignon's Australian Nouveau Theatre (Anthill) in late 1991. In 1991 he resumed working with Barrie Kosky (who had directed him in student productions at Melbourne University) as a member of Gilgul, a Melbourne company exploring Jewish cultural identity. He acted in their productions of The Dybbuk (1992), Es Brent (1993), The Wilderness Room (1995) and The Operated Jew (1996).

He began writing for the theatre in the late 1990s, although he continued performing into the early 2000s. This Is a True Story, a monologue dealing with a death row case, which he wrote and performed, had multiple seasons and later toured to Sydney and London.

Lorilei: A Meditation on Loss, based on another death row case, and performed by Anna Galvin, played in Melbourne, Sydney, Edinburgh, London and Vancouver in 2003, and has since gone on to be performed in other nations such as Belgium and Pakistan. The BBC Radio 4 radio version of Lorilei won the Gold Prize for Drama at the Radio Academy Awards in 2007.

In 2006 he again resumed working with Kosky, writing The Lost Echo, an eight-hour adaptation of Ovid's Metamorphoses. At the 2007 Helpmann Awards this production won five awards, including Best Play and Best New Australian work.

Wright's adaptation of Euripides' tragedy The Women of Troy was awarded Best Mainstage Production at the 2008 Sydney Theatre Awards.

In 2009 his co-adaptation of Shakespeare's history plays, performed under the title The War of the Roses, was directed by Benedict Andrews for Sydney Theatre Company. This production collected four Helpmanns in 2009, including Best Play, and was listed as the theatre masterpiece of the decade by The Monthly in October 2011.

Wright's 2012 play On The Misconception of Oedipus played at Malthouse Theatre in Melbourne and Perth Theatre Company, under the direction of Matthew Lutton. It won four Green Room Awards that year including Best Writing.

In 2014 Wright's play Black Diggers premiered in Sydney under the direction of Wesley Enoch; later it toured Australia playing in Melbourne, Canberra, Perth, Adelaide, Brisbane and Bendigo. A text exploring Indigenous Australian experiences in the First World War, Black Diggers was awarded the Nick Enright Prize for Playwriting at the 2015 New South Wales Premier's Literary Awards.

2017 saw the premier of The Real and Imagined History of The Elephant Man, a play that revisited the actual history of Joseph Merrick joining up what is known about his tragic life with passages that explore the depth of what it is to be a disabled person. The play premiered on 4 August 2017, starring Daniel Monks in the title role. The cast also featured Paula Arundell, Julie Forsyth, Emma J. Hawkins, and Sophie Ross. The play toured the UK in 2023, directed by Stephen Bailey and starring Zak Ford-Williams as Joseph. This cast of this production included Annabelle Davies and Nadia Nadarajah, and off the back of this production the play was published as a book.

His 2025 play, Troy, was shortlisted for the Nick Enright Prize for Playwriting, NSW Premier's Literary Awards in 2026.

== Personal life ==
Wright's partner is Jo Dyer, the political candidate, lawyer and theatre producer.

== Selected works ==
- Ghost Train, (Kroetz, Napier St Theatre (Melbourne), 1995)
- The Caucasian Chalk Circle (Brecht, Belvoir, 1998)
- Ubu (after Jarry. Melbourne Festival, 2001)
- Medea (Melbourne Festival, 2002, directed by Daniel Schlusser)
- This Is a True Story (2002)
- Babes in the Wood (Playbox Theatre, Melbourne, 2003)
- Lorilei (2003)
- Tense Dave (Chunky Move, 2003)
- Mr Puntila and his Man Matti (Brecht, for Australian Theatre for Young People, 2004)
- A Journal of the Plague Year (Defoe, Malthouse, 2005)
- The Odyssey (Malthouse, 2006)
- The Lost Echo (STC, 2006)
- The Duel (2007)
- Criminology (with Lally Katz, Arena Theatre Company, 2007; directed by Rosemary Myers)
- Tales From the Vienna Woods (Ödön von Horváth, STC, 2007)
- The Women of Troy (STC and Malthouse, 2008)
- The War of the Roses (2009)
- Optimism (after Voltaire, Sydney Opera House, 2009)
- Baal (Brecht, STC and Malthouse, 2011; directed by Simon Stone)
- Oresteia (STC, 2011)
- The Histrionic (Thomas Bernhard, 2011)
- The Castle (after Franz Kafka, STC, 2012)
- On the Misconception of Oedipus (2012)
- The Misanthrope (Molière, Malthouse, 2013)
- Black Diggers (Sydney Festival, 2014)
- The Good Person of Szechuan (Brecht, Malthouse 2014, toured Shanghai and Beijing, directed by Meng Jinghui)
- Picnic at Hanging Rock (adapted from the novel by Joan Lindsay, Malthouse and Black Swan State Theatre Company, 2016)
- Biographica (libretto, composer Mary Finsterer, Sydney Chamber Opera, 2017)
- The Real & Imagined History of The Elephant Man (2017)
- Bliss (after Peter Carey's novel, Malthouse and Belvoir, 2018)
- The Resistible Rise of Arturo Ui (Brecht, Sydney Theatre Company, 2018)
- Life of Galileo (Brecht, Belvoir, 2019)
- The Last Season (Force Majeure (Dance Company), 2021)
- Antarctica (libretto; composer Mary Finsterer, Sydney Chamber Opera, Holland Festival 2022 & Sydney Festival 2023)
- The Rising World (libretto, composer Mary Finsterer, Seoul, 2025)
- Troy (Malthouse, 2025)
