= Matthew Lutton =

Australian theatre and opera director

Matthew Lutton is an Australian theatre and opera director. He was associate director of the Black Swan Theatre Company in 2006. He was the founder and director of ThinIce theatre company (2002–2012) in Perth, Western Australia. Moving to Melbourne in 2011, he was first associate artist (directing), and from 2015 artistic director and co-CEO of Malthouse Theatre. In March 2025 he was appointed artistic director of the Adelaide Festival for three years, starting with the 2026 festival.

== Early life and education ==
Matthew Lutton was born in Perth, Western Australia. He grew up in the suburb of Wembley, and spent much time as a boy playing on the shores of Lake Monger. His maternal grandmother, Bethwyn Taylor, was a theosophist and painter. She died when Lutton was 17, and the family moved into her house, where his mother, Susan, had grown up, in Doubleview, near Scarborough Beach.

He attended Perth's Hale School, an Anglican school, graduating in 2001.

He studied theatre arts at the Western Australian Academy of Performing Arts.

== Career ==
=== Theatre ===
In 2002 Lutton formed the ThinIce theatre company, which staged Ionesco's The Bald Prima Donna at the 2003 Perth International Fringe Festival. For ThinIce he directed the premiere of Brendan Cowell's play Bed at Perth Institute of Contemporary Arts and devised two new works with Eamon Flack, The Gathering in 2005 and The Goose Chase in 2007. The Goose Chase was a solo piece for Flack, co-produced with Deckchair Theatre.

Lutton was appointed the artistic director of Black Swan Theatre Company's emerging artists' program at the BSX-Theatre in 2003 where, between 2003 and 2006, he directed Harold Pinter's Mountain Language, Mrozek's Striptease, Büchner's Woyzeck and Dürrenmatt's The Visit. He became the associate director of the Black Swan Theatre Company in 2006, and in 2007 directed Mishima's The Lady Aoi for the Perth International Arts Festival.

In 2008 Lutton was Michael Kantor's assistant director on Malthouse Theatre's production of Molière's Tartuffe in Melbourne. Kantor fell ill two days before rehearsals commenced and Lutton was invited to take over the production as director. He then went on to direct the world premiere of Tom Holloway's play Don't Say the Words at Sydney's Griffin Theatre Company and Red Shoes (a version of the Hans Christian Andersen story adapted by Humphrey Bower) for ThinIce and Artrage.

In 2009 ThinIce was appointed triennial funding from both the Australia Council for the Arts and ArtsWA. Over the next three years ThinIce created six new works in partnership with other Australian arts organisations. These included a new production of Antigone (adapted by Eamon Flack and featuring singer Rachael Dease) with the Perth International Arts Festival; The Duel (a Dostoevsky adaptation written by Tom Wright) with Sydney Theatre Company; Tom Holloway's Love Me Tender with Belvoir Street Theatre and Griffin Theatre Company; and The Trial (adapted from the Kafka novel by Louise Fox) with Sydney Theatre Company and Malthouse Theatre. In November 2009 Lutton directed part one of The Mysteries: Genesis at Sydney Theatre Company. Parts two and three were directed by Tom Wright and Andrew Upton.

Lutton was appointed associate artist (directing) at Melbourne's Malthouse Theatre in 2011. He closed down ThinIce in 2012. In this role, Lutton directed award-winning productions including On the Misconception of Oedipus by Tom Wright and The Bloody Chamber, based on the short story by Angela Carter and adapted by Van Badham (2013).

In 2015 Lutton was appointed artistic director and co-CEO of the Malthouse.

In April 2016, Lutton directed a Malthouse-Black Swan joint production in the world premiere of an adaptation of the novel Picnic at Hanging Rock, which was performed at The State Theatre, Perth, April 1 to 17. The play was invited to be performed at the Royal Lyceum Theatre in Edinburgh and the Barbican in London.

Other directing highlights include the five-hour stage adaptation of Tim Winton's Cloudstreet, co-produced with the Perth International Arts Festival; the Australian premiere of Tom Waits' musical The Black Rider co-produced with Victorian Opera; The Real and Imagined History of the Elephant Man, David Greig's Solaris in a co-production with the Lyric Hammersmith in London and the Royal Lyceum Edinburgh; John Harvey's First Nations epic, The Return, co-directed with Jason Tamiru as part of RISING Festival; and Australia's largest immersive theatre production, Because the Night, in 2021.

Lutton resigned from his role at Malthouse Theatre as of the end of March 2025.

=== Festival director ===
In March 2025 was announced as the artistic director of the Adelaide Festival (AF) for a three-year term. In January 2026, he was overseas planning the 2027 programme when an unprecedented crisis hit the festival, with the boycott of Writers' Week (an annual event that is part of AF) by almost all invited authors, along with a huge public backlash, after the AF board had rescinded the invitation of Palestinian Australian writer Randa Abdel-Fattah.

=== Opera ===
In 2007 Lutton attended the Jerwood Opera Writing Foundation Program, directed by Giorgio Battistelli, at the Aldeburgh Festival in England. While at Aldeburgh he collaborated with Czech composer Miroslav Srnka for the first time. In 2008 Srnka and Lutton received fellowships from the Jerwood Foundation and Aldeburgh Music to create a new opera, Make No Noise, commissioned by the Bavarian State Opera. The opera, with a libretto by Tom Holloway, is based on Isabel Coixet's film The Secret Life of Words, and had its world premiere at the Munich Opera Festival on 1 July 2011.

In 2012 Lutton directed Strauss's Elektra for West Australian Opera, Opera Australia, ThinIce, and Perth International Arts Festival, with Danish soprano Eva Johansson singing the title role.

In 2013 Lutton directed Wagner's The Flying Dutchman for New Zealand Opera, and in 2022 Kurt Weill's Happy End for Victorian Opera.

== Other roles ==
In 2008 Lutton was the West Australian representative on the Australia Council for the Arts Theatre Board.

Lutton has been a judge on the theatre panel at the Helpmann Awards, and has been a non-executive director on the board of the Stephanie Lake Company since 2018.

== Awards ==
- 2003: Best Production at the Perth International Fringe Festival for The Bald Prima Donna
- 2005: Best Production, Equity Guild Awards, for The Visit
- 2005: Young West Australian of the Year for Arts
- 2007: ArtsWA Young People and the Arts Fellowship
- 2010: Western Australia Citizen of the Year: Youth Arts
- 2011: State Finalist, Young Australian of the Year for WA
- 2011: Best Director, Green Room Awards, for On the Misconception of Oedipus
- 2013: Best Production, Green Room Awards, for The Bloody Chamber
- 2015: Best Production, Green Room Awards, for I Am a Miracle
- 2023: Medal of the Order of Australia (OAM) for services to the arts as a director in the King's Birthday 2023 Honours List

== Personal life ==
In 2016 he revealed that he was in a relationship with Russell Hooper, a policy writer for the Victorian Government.
