= No-One Cares About Your Creative Hub So Get Your Fuckin' Hedge Cut =

Studio album by Half Man Half Biscuit
- Released: 18 May 2018
- Genre: Post punk
- Length: 38:57
- Label: Probe Plus

Half Man Half Biscuit chronology
And Some Fell on Stony Ground (2016)	No-One Cares About Your Creative Hub So Get Your Fuckin' Hedge Cut (2018)	The Voltarol Years (2022)

No-One Cares About Your Creative Hub So Get Your Fuckin' Hedge Cut is the fourteenth album by Wirral-based rock band Half Man Half Biscuit, released on 18 May 2018 on Probe Plus Records. It is the highest-charting album in the band's history, reaching UK #33.

The track "Every Time a Bell Rings" begins with the line "Ground control to Monty Don", mixing the opening words of David Bowie's "Space Oddity" with the Gardener's World presenter and satirises the Mamil concept.

== Track listing ==
No.	Title	Length
1.	"Alehouse Futsal"	1:48
2.	"Man of Constant Sorrow (With a Garage in Constant Use)"	2:07
3.	"Knobheads on Quiz Shows"	4:04
4.	"Bladderwrack Allowance"	3:55
5.	"Renfield's Afoot"	1:18
6.	"Terminus"	3:46
7.	"The Announcement"	2:41
8.	"What Made Colombia Famous"	3:07
9.	"Harsh Times in Umberstone Covert"	3:33
10.	"Every Time a Bell Rings"	5:06
11.	"Emergency Locksmith"	3:05
12.	"Mod. Diff. Vdiff. Hard Severe"	2:41
13.	"Swerving the Checkatrade"	1:46

== Charts ==
Chart (2018)	Peak position
Scottish Albums (OCC)	16
UK Albums (OCC)	33
UK Independent Albums (OCC)	7
