= Bed (2002 play) =

2002 play by Brendan Cowell

- Written by: Brendan Cowell
- Original language: English
- Genre: Comedy

Premiere
- Date premiered: 2002

Bed is a play by Australian actor and playwright Brendan Cowell. In February 2002 Cowell won the Patrick White Playwrights' Award, shared with two others, for this play. It is about a man, Phil, who is on his deathbed and revisits his five most significant lovers through his life.

It debuted in 2004 when it was staged at the Perth Institute of Contemporary Arts, directed by Matthew Lutton and featuring Andrew Hale in the lead role supported by Nick Candy, Gillian Alexy, Renee McIntosh, Leon Bryant and Francesca Waters.

In 2005 it had a season at Wharf 2 presented by the Sydney Theatre Company as a part of Blueprints. It was directed by Cowell and Daniel Wyllie played Phil with Annie Byron, Hayley McElhinney, Thomas Campbell, Caroline Craig and Sam Leis playing his lovers. Lenny Ann Low of The Sydney Morning Herald finishes her review "Bed makes you hunger for the next scene and lose yourself in its characters' lives. And, at its very best moments, it sings with truth, poetry and pain." The Australian's John McCallum writes "The style of the writing is exaggerated, almost surreal. Sometimes it strains after effect, and some of the abruptly revealed changes in Phil's life are over the top. Overall, however, it is Cowell's best play yet." He notes "By the end of the play this contradictory man has suddenly, unexpectedly learned how to love and be loved." Keith Gallasch writes in Realtime "Built from short scenes, propelled by an often acid wit and cyclically structured to systematically go back over a life and reveal the making and unmaking of a man at key stages, Bed is certainly engaging, though the initial effect is more powerful than that which lingers. For all its viscerality and frankness, Bed is curiously abstract."
