= Mamil =

Acronym for "middle-aged man in lycra"

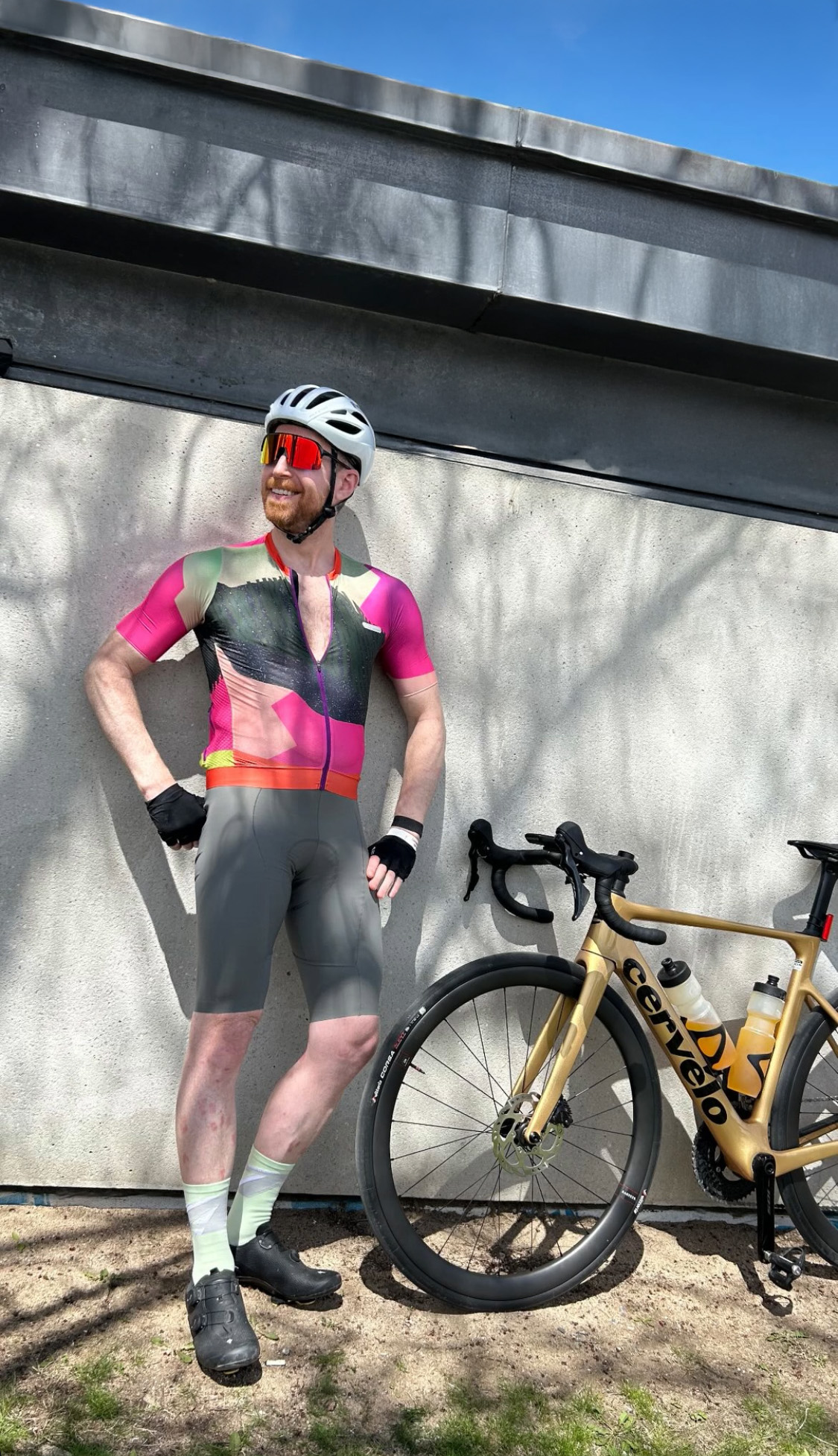
Middle-aged man in lycra

Mamil (or MAMIL) is an acronym and a pejorative term for a "middle-aged man in Lycra" – that is, men who ride an expensive racing bicycle for leisure, while wearing body-hugging jerseys and bicycle shorts.

The word was reportedly coined by British marketing research firm Mintel in 2010. It gained further popularity in the United Kingdom with the success of Bradley Wiggins in the 2012 Tour de France and at the 2012 Summer Olympics, held in London. British UCI World Championships victories in recent years have also spurred interest in cycling in the UK.

In Australia the popularity of this sort of cycling has been associated with the Tour Down Under and the 2011 Tour de France winner Cadel Evans. Former Prime Minister Tony Abbott has been described as a "mamil".

Similarly, in Slovakia, the popularity of road cycling and wearing colorful Lycra on the roads rose after Peter Sagan began winning in the Tour de France and World Championships.

Buying an expensive road bicycle has been described as a more healthy and affordable response to a midlife crisis than buying an expensive sports car.

There are documentaries investigating this cycling culture. MAMIL is the title of a one-man play by New Zealand playwright Greg Cooper, written for actor Mark Hadlow. It is also the title of a feature-length documentary directed by Nickolas Bird and produced by Bird, Eleanor Sharpe and Mark Bird. The song "Every Time A Bell Rings" by Half Man Half Biscuit lampoons the concept of mamils with the lyrics:

...got a Boardman bike on the Cycle to Work scheme

... Started watching the Tour de France highlights on ITV Four

Worshipped at the altar of Wiggo and Froomedog

Goes out every Sunday in full Sky replica kit'

== See also ==
- Anti-cycling sentiment
