= The Trumpton Riots EP =

EP by Half Man Half Biscuit
- Released: 1986
- Genre: Post-punk
- Length: 13:14 / 16:24
- Label: Probe Plus TRUMP1 / TRUMX1
- Producers: Sam Davis and Geoff Davies

Half Man Half Biscuit chronology
Back in the DHSS (1985)	The Trumpton Riots EP (1986)	Back Again in the DHSS (1987)

The Trumpton Riots EP is a 1986 12" 45½rpm [sic] vinyl EP by the English indie band, Half Man Half Biscuit. The original release (TRUMP1) comprised the first four tracks listed below. A re-release later that year (TRUMX1) also included the fifth one.

1. "The Trumpton Riots" (3:11)
2. "Architecture, Morality, Ted and Alice" (3:43)
3. "1966 and All That" (3:18)
4. "Albert Hammond Bootleg" (3:02)
5. "All I Want for Christmas Is a Dukla Prague Away Kit" (3:10)

"The Trumpton Riots (Top 20 Mix)" and "All I Want For Christmas Is a Dukla Prague Away Kit" were released in 1986 on a 7" vinyl single (Probe Plus TRUM1-7"), before the release of the five-track EP. The EP was incorporated into the 2003 re-release on CD of the album Back in the DHSS. There, the title of the second song is given as "Architecture and Morality Ted and Alice".

In a 2001 appreciation of the band, music writer and novelist Kevin Sampson described the EP as "utterly marvellous".

In May 2016, The Guardian newspaper reported that Gordon Murray's family were contemplating suing the band Radiohead for infringing the copyright of the idea of Trumptonshire, in the video for their single "Burn the Witch". The same report noted that Half Man Half Biscuit's 1980s song "The Trumpton Riots" had "portrayed Trumptonshire as a place of striking firemen, militant socialism, and military coups".

== Cultural references ==
As is usual with Half Man Half Biscuit, the songs contain multiple cultural references, often obscure. Those identified include:

- "The Trumpton Riots" imagines a violent civil insurrection in Trumpton, a fictional town inhabited by stop-motion characters which featured in BBC TV children's programmes of 1966–69; the song also mentions several of the best-known characters in those programmes.
  - The instrumental and hummed introduction is to the tune of "To Be a Pilgrim" ("He Who Would Valiant Be") by John Bunyan (1628–88) as arranged by the English classical composer Ralph Vaughan Williams (1872–1958)
    - The song "He Who Would Valium Take" on the band's 1997 album Voyage to the Bottom of the Road refers to the same hymn
  - "Cant conformism" puns on:
    - cant, a jargon or argot of a group, often employed to exclude or mislead people outside that group
    - Brian Cant (born 1933), narrator of the Trumpton programmes
    - Immanuel Kant (1724–1804), German philosopher who argued that reason is the source of morality

A tea towel commemorating the 1981 wedding of Charles, Prince of Wales, and Lady Diana Spencer, of the kind referred to in "Architecture and Morality Ted and Alice"

- "Architecture and Morality Ted and Alice" combines the title of the 1981 album Architecture & Morality by Orchestral Manoeuvres in the Dark, and the title of the 1969 film Bob & Carol & Ted & Alice
  - Diana, Princess of Wales (1961–97), English aristocrat
  - Hannu Mikkola (1942–2021), Finnish rally driver
  - Radio Dada, a name which combines the Dada surrealist movement and "Radio Ga Ga", a 1984 single by the band Queen
  - Jane Scott, a dating agency for the English upper class
  - Miriam Stoppard (born 1937), British doctor, author, television presenter and advice columnist
- Albert Hammond (born 1944), English singer, songwriter and record producer raised in Gibraltar
  - Robin Askwith (born 1950), English film actor
  - Logie Baird (1888–1946), Scottish inventor known for his involvement in the development of television
  - Club 18-30, a London-based holiday company that provides holidays for people aged 17–35 [sic] in typical party island destinations (for example, San Antonio, Ibiza)
  - DC-10, a three-engine wide-body jet passenger airliner which in its early years had a poor safety record
  - Marseille, a city and popular holiday destination on the French Riviera
  - Stanley Rous (1895–1986), English football administrator
- "1966 and All That" alludes both to the comic misrepresentation of English history 1066 and All That by Sellar and Yeatman, and to the England men's national football team's sole victory in a major international football competition (as of 2025), in the 1966 World Cup
  - George Farm (1924–2004), Scottish goalkeeper
  - Gibraltar, a British Overseas Territory in the Iberian Peninsula; which according to legend, will remain under British rule so long as Barbary apes survive there
  - Stanley Mortensen (1921–91), English footballer
  - Ferenc Puskás (1927–2006), Hungarian footballer
  - Bert Trautmann (1923–2013), German goalkeeper who played for Manchester City, and who famously continued playing in the 1956 FA Cup Final after suffering a broken neck
  - Lev Yashin (1929–90), Russian goalkeeper
- The title "All I Want For Christmas Is a Dukla Prague Away Kit" alludes to both the 1944 novelty Christmas song "All I Want for Christmas Is My Two Front Teeth" by Donald Yetter Gardner (1913–2004), and to the 1963 novelty Christmas song "All I Want For Christmas Is a Beatle" by Dora Bryan (1923–2014)
  - Away kit is sports clothing designed to distinguish the visiting team from the home team when similar team colours might confuse the players, spectators, and officials
  - Dukla Prague, a football team from Prague (1948–96), whose away kit consisted of yellow stockings, red shorts, and a yellow shirt with non-detachable red sleeves. In 2001, FK Dukla Prague adopted the name of that by-then-disbanded club; their away kit is all red, but also has non-detachable sleeves
  - Giro, a British slang name for a welfare cheque
  - Scalextric, a slot car racing game
  - Subbuteo, a tabletop game simulating a variety of sports; in this case, association football
