= Trouble over Bridgwater =

Trouble Over Bridgwater

Studio album by Half Man Half Biscuit
- Released: 25 April 2000
- Label: Probe Plus

Half Man Half Biscuit chronology
Four Lads Who Shook the Wirral (1998)	Trouble Over Bridgwater (2000)	Editor's Recommendation (2001)

Professional ratings
Review scores
Source	Rating
Allmusic	4/5 stars
NME	7/10
Spike Magazine	

Trouble over Bridgwater is the eighth album by UK rock band Half Man Half Biscuit, released in 2000. The title is a play on words, based on the Simon and Garfunkel classic, "Bridge over Troubled Water".

== Release ==
The single "Look Dad No Tunes" released by Probe Plus Records on 3 September 1999.

John Peel, who admired the band, included "Look Dad No Tunes" at No. 11 in his 1999 Festive Fifty.

"Lock Up Your Mountain Bikes" parodies the traditional song "She'll Be Coming 'Round the Mountain".

== Track listing ==
1. "Irk the Purists"
2. "Uffington Wassail"
3. "Third Track Main Camera Four Minutes"
4. "Nove on the Sly"
5. "Ballad of Climie Fisher"
6. "Gubba Look-a-Likes"
7. "Mathematically Safe"
8. "With Goth on Our Side"
9. "Used to Be in Evil Gazebo"
10. "Slight Reprise"
11. "It's Clichéd to Be Cynical at Christmas"
12. "Visitor for Mr Edmonds"
13. "Bottleneck at Capel Curig"
14. "Emerging from Gorse"
15. "Look Dad No Tunes"
16. "Twenty Four Hour Garage People"

== Cultural references ==
Half Man Half Biscuit often make sly or direct references to celebrities, TV programmes, sportspeople, and to other tunes, lyrics and even literary classics. On this album, those identified include:

- The CD inlay reproduces the title page of Old English Songs by the folk song collector John Broadwood (1798–1864)
- "Irk the Purists" interpolates the hymn Oil in My Lamp and the Black Lace song Agadoo, and references many credible bands and pop artists
- "Third Track Main Camera Four Minutes" quotes from Thomas Hardy's The Return of the Native
- "Gubba Lookalikes" is a reference to Tony Gubba (1943–2013), a British sports commentator, best known for his football commentaries on BBC's Match of the Day in the 1980s and 1990s.
- "With Goth on Our Side" references the Bob Dylan song "With God on Our Side".
- "Used to Be in Evil Gazebo" references Nick Drake, Tindersticks, the murder of Tupac Shakur, and a non-credible band
- "Slight Reprise" is a pun on The Bluetones' "Slight Return" and Jimi Hendrix's "Voodoo Child (Slight Return)"
- The title "Twenty Four Hour Garage People" is a pun on Happy Mondays' "24 Hour Party People". The middle section of the song parodies "Rock Island Line"; and the conclusion, Lead Belly's version of "In the Pines"
