= 1966 and All That (radio) =

- Genre: Satirical history
- Running time: 35:00
- Country of origin: United Kingdom
- Language(s): English
- Home station: BBC Radio 4
- Written by: Craig Brown
- Narrated by: Joss Ackland; Eleanor Bron; Rory Bremner; John Humphreys; Margaret Cabourn-Smith
- Original release: 8 September – 29 September 2006
- No. of series: 1
- No. of episodes: 4
- Website: www.bbc.co.uk/programmes/b0100q3l

1966 and All That is a radio adaptation of the book of the same name in four episodes, broadcast between 8 September and 29 September 2006. Written by Craig Brown, the series was narrated by Eleanor Bron, Joss Ackland, Ewan Bailey and Margaret Cabourn-Smith. In 2007, it won a Gold Sony Radio Academy Award.

The book and series are a comic reworking of the history of Britain in the 20th century, and therefore an homage and sequel to 1066 and All That, published in the 1930s and originally serialised in Punch.

== Episodes ==
Four episodes of approximately thirty minutes each.

Episode 1: 1920s ("An Irresponsible Decade") And 1930s ("An Anxious Decade")

King George V utters some unmemorable last words; DH Lawrence of Arabia writes Lady Chatterbox's Llama; and John Yogi Bear discovers the BBC, run by Lord Funeral Wreath, but finds there's not much on. The nation first faced sex and didn't like what it saw.

Episode 2: 1940s

The French Resistance triumph under General de Girl; Hitler gets stuck in a bunker; and John Humphrys interviews Churchill.

Episode 3: 1960s

Albert Einstein discovers The Beatles. We take a look at the era of Flour Power; the World Cup is won by a team of men all called Bobby; and the Royal Family attempts to stay with-it by barbecuing.

Episode 4: 1980s And 1990s

Neil Knock-Knock, an after-dinner joke, becomes leader of the Labour Party; Jeffrey Archer reveals he's won the Nobel Prize; Lloads of London goes pear-shaped; and John Minor stands against himself, and loses.
