= McIntyre, Treadmore and Davitt =

Studio album by Half Man Half Biscuit
- Released: 1991
- Studios: Shabby Road Studios, Pink Museum
- Length: 38:10
- Label: Probe Plus Probe 30CD
- Producer: Bald Brothers

Half Man Half Biscuit chronology
ACD (1989)	McIntyre, Treadmore and Davitt (1991)	This Leaden Pall (1993)

Professional ratings
Review scores
Source	Rating
AllMusic	3/5 stars
NME	7/10
Select	1/5

McIntyre, Treadmore and Davitt was released in 1991 by British rock band Half Man Half Biscuit as their third original album (their preceding album having been a compilation). It was the first album released after the band had reformed in 1990.

The title and album sleeve picture are both taken from a Ripping Yarns episode entitled "Golden Gordon".

== Critical reception ==
- Stewart Mason, AllMusic: "[E]ven though the songs are both slower and longer, that cosmetic change only gave singer/songwriter Nigel Blackwell a broader canvas for his increasingly complex, multi-layered lyrics."
- Danny Scott, Select: "Once wicked wits of the North, HMHB have become rock's sad, old game-show hosts – same suit, same kitsch catchphrase. Only 'Prag Vec At The Melt Vet [sic]' and Christian Rock Concert' show the bristling sarcasm of yore."

== Track listing ==
1. "Outbreak of Vitas Gerulaitis"
2. "Prag Vec at the Melkweg"
3. "Christian Rock Concert"
4. "Let's Not"
5. "Yipps (My Baby Got The)"
6. "Hedley Verityesque"
7. "A Lilac Harry Quinn"
8. "Our Tune"
9. "Girlfriend's Finished with Him"
10. "Everything's A.O.R."

== Cultural references ==
- Outbreak of Vitas Gerulaitis – Vitas Gerulaitis (flamboyant tennis player), Virginia Wade (another tennis player, referring to the play Who's afraid of Virginia Woolf), Rampton Secure Hospital, a high security psychiatric hospital in Nottinghamshire, Scooby-Doo ("Why, Mr Kowalski it was you all along!"), Tarkus (album by Emerson Lake and Palmer).
- Prag Vec at the Melkweg – Lyric refers to The Beatles song "Yellow Submarine". The Enterprise Allowance Scheme (funded unemployed people to start businesses), Meadowlark Lemon (basketball player), Tony Monopoly (Opportunity Knocks winner), Conny Plank (German electronic music producer), Johnny Kwango (British wrestler), Dawlish, Craig Stadler (golfer), Frisbees, Spandex, PragVEC (punk band), the Melkweg, listeria.
- Christian Rock Concert – Kerrang magazine for rock fans, Stryper, backwards lyrics, Shane Fenton (also known as Alvin Stardust), Euston Station, After the Fire, Wendy Wimbush (cricket statistician), space hoppers
- Let's Not – caravan holidays, acid, Peter Grummitt, footballer, the Highway Code, Norfolk, Godzilla, Diss, Jack Kerouac's On the Road, folk song "One Man Went to Mow", author Carla Lane, grindcore, Vanburn Holder (cricketer), Jesus, Grant Baynham, (occasional contributor to That's Life!).
- Yipps (My Baby got The) – A (mostly) golfing song. Yips (interferes with your putting), Jack Nicklaus (The bear), Care Bears, Greg Norman (The Shark), Julio Iglesias, Ultra Surs (Real Madrid crowd song).
- Hedley Verityesque – Hedley Verity (cricketer and spin bowler), Caves of Drach in Mallorca, paper rounds, Alsatian dogs, film noir, Blockbusters, Peter Sarstedt, Kip Keino (athlete).
- A Lilac Harry Quinn – Title refers to a bicycle frame maker in Liverpool. Jim Jones (cult leader, responsible for the Jonestown mass deaths), Journey, Pink Floyd song Shine On You Crazy Diamond, Wirral, Dick Quax (athlete), Dire Straits album Alchemy, the Goodyear Blimp, Sturmey-Archer and Campagnolo (bicycle gear manufacturers).
- Our Tune – Alan Brazil (Scottish football commentator), the A47, the Goombay Dance Band, the Rocky Horror Picture Show, golf, St Neots, Bunty James (presenter on children's TV show How!), rugby league ground Hilton Park (now demolished), "Grocer Jack", Alessi brothers song Oh Lori, Eagle Comics strip Billy's Boots (owned boots that made him brilliant at football).
- Girlfriend's finished with him – Frazier Chorus (indie band), Willem van Hanegem, Telly Savalas, Whitechapel.
- Everything's A.O.R. – Kendo Nagasaki, Millican & Nesbitt (singing miners who won Opportunity Knocks), Flintlock (pop group), Sade, Whitney Houston, Luther Vandross, T'Pau, Jackie (teenage magazine for girls).
