= Achtung Bono =

Studio album by Half Man Half Biscuit
- Released: 12 September 2005
- Recorded: Frog Studios, Warrington
- Genre: Post-punk
- Length: 40:34
- Label: Probe Plus Probe 57
- Producer: Carl Wark

Half Man Half Biscuit chronology
Saucy Haulage Ballads (2003)	Achtung Bono (2005)	CSI:Ambleside (2008)
- Dedicated to the memory of John Peel

Professional ratings
Review scores
Source	Rating
Allmusic	4.5/5 stars
Stylus Magazine	A−

Achtung Bono is the tenth album by UK indie rock band Half Man Half Biscuit, released in 2005.

In 2010, a Facebook campaign was mounted with the aim of saving BBC 6 Music from threatened closure and, as a sign of protest, to get "Joy Division Oven Gloves" from Achtung Bono to No. 6 in the UK Singles Chart on 12 April 2010. In the event, it entered the Singles Chart that week at No. 56 and the Independent Singles Chart at No. 3. Whether or not the campaign was influential, BBC 6 Music was saved.

== Critical reception ==
Reviews were generally favourable:

- Stewart Mason, Allmusic: "One of their finest albums".
- Roger Holland, PopMatters: "Achtung Bono is a worthy addition to the HMHB canon".
- Ben Granger, Spike Magazine: "This is probably not one of Half Man Half Biscuit’s best albums. And yet its [sic] still fantastic".
- Dom Passantino, Stylus Magazine: "UK album of the year, by a landslide".

== Track listing ==
No.	Title	Length
1.	"Restless Legs"	1:53
2.	"Corgi Registered Friends"	3:39
3.	"For What Is Chatteris..."	2:05
4.	"Shit Arm, Bad Tattoo"	2:41
5.	"Surging Out of Convalescence"	3:38
6.	"Upon Westminster Bridge"	2:45
7.	"Joy Division Oven Gloves"	3:10
8.	"Mate of the Bloke"	3:37
9.	"Asparagus Next Left"	2:55
10.	"Depressed Beyond Tablets"	3:00
11.	"Bogus Official"	1:22
12.	"Letters Sent"	2:38
13.	"Twydale's Lament"	3:31
14.	"We Built This Village on a Trad. Arr. Tune"	3:48

== Notes ==
- The album title is a satirical reference to the title of the 1991 album Achtung Baby by Irish rock band U2 and to its singer Bono.
- Restless legs syndrome is a poorly understood neurological disorder.
- Until 1 April 2009, gas fitters in the UK had to be "Corgi registered" to practise their trade. Corgi stands for the Council for Registered Gas Installers; since replaced by Gas Safe.
- Chatteris is a small town in Cambridgeshire.
- "Shit Arm, Bad Tattoo" has been suggested to refer to the cover of the eponymous second album by the Libertines, released 2004. Nigel Blackwell of Half Man Half Biscuit has, however, denied such a connection.
- Upon Westminster Bridge is an 1802 poem by William Wordsworth (1770–1850).
- Westminster Bridge is a major bridge over the River Thames in central London.
- Joy Division were an influential band from Manchester in the late 1970s and early 1980s. The song "Joy Division Oven Gloves" satirises band merchandising.
- "Asparagus Next Left" is the sort of sign that can be seen on British country roads advertising farm products for sale at the farm gate.
- "Depressed Beyond Tablets" is from a line in the "Crime" episode of Chris Morris's controversial TV comedy Brass Eye.
- "Bogus Official" is asterisked on the album track listing as a 'Public information tune'.
- Twydale is a fictional person.
- The title "We Built This Village on a Trad. Arr. Tune" parodies that of the 1985 song "We Built This City" by Starship.
- "Trad. Arr." is short for "traditional, arranged (by)", and is often attached to recordings of folk music.
- Brenda Blethyn starred in Outside Edge, a 1990s ITV sitcom about a village cricket team.
