= This Leaden Pall =

Studio album by Half Man Half Biscuit
- Released: 1993
- Recorded: Bus Stop Studios, Leigh
- Genre: Indie rock
- Length: 53:14
- Label: Probe Plus Probe 36
- Producer: Half Man Half Biscuit and Geoff Davies

Half Man Half Biscuit chronology
McIntyre, Treadmore and Davitt (1991)	This Leaden Pall (1993)	Some Call It Godcore (1995)

Professional ratings
Review scores
Source	Rating
AllMusic	3.5/5 stars
NME	6/10
Select	4/5

This Leaden Pall is the fourth album by the English rock band Half Man Half Biscuit, released in 1993.

The album cover features a bleak overdeveloped picture of the now demolished Hale Wood pub in Halewood, Merseyside. In 2001 it was voted the 93rd best LP sleeve of all time in Q magazine.

Anecdotally, lead singer Nigel Blackwell has referred to the album as their Closer.

== Critical reception ==
- Stewart Mason, AllMusic: "Following the somewhat shaky McIntyre, Treadmore & Davitt, This Leaden Pall is a much more self-assured transition into the new era of Half Man Half Biscuit."
- Johnny Cigarettes, NME: "Nigel Crossley [sic]'s reputation as the only rival to Vic Reeves in making cultural ephemera unfeasibly funny remains untarnished."
- Andrew Harrison, Select: "[I]n '93 the Half Men remain gloriously morose and cruelly observant."

== Track listing ==
1. "M-6-ster"
2. "4AD3DCD"
3. "Running Order Squabble Fest"
4. "Whiteness Thy Name Is Meltonian"
5. "This Leaden Pall"
6. "Turned up Clocked on Laid Off"
7. "Improv Workshop Mimeshow Gobshite"
8. "13 Eurogoths Floating in the Dead Sea"
9. "Whit Week Malarkey"
10. "Doreen"
11. "Quality Janitor"
12. "Floreat Inertia"
13. "Malayan Jelutong"
14. "Numanoid Hang-glide"
15. "Footprints"
