= Four Lads Who Shook the Wirral =

Studio album by Half Man Half Biscuit
- Released: 29 June 1998
- Recorded: Bus Stop Studios, Leigh
- Genre: Post-punk
- Length: 41:25
- Label: Probe Plus PROBE 46
- Producers: HMHB and Geoff Davies

Half Man Half Biscuit chronology
Voyage to the Bottom of the Road (1997)	Four Lads Who Shook the Wirral (1998)	Trouble over Bridgwater (2000)

Professional ratings
Review scores
Source	Rating
Allmusic	3/5 stars
NME	5/10

Four Lads Who Shook the Wirral is the seventh album by Wirral-based UK rock band Half Man Half Biscuit (HMHB), released in June 1998.

== Critical reception ==
- Stewart Mason, AllMusic: "Half Man Half Biscuit released this album within one calendar year of its predecessor, 1997's Voyage to the Bottom of the Road [...], and perhaps that accounts for the somewhat lackluster feel. [...] [T]here is enough of interest here to appeal to the converted, but newcomers should perhaps start elsewhere."
- Simon Williams, NME: "Chances of cracking open the notoriously fickle American market: slimmer than Lena Zavaroni's mop handle."

== Track listing ==
No.	Title	Length
1.	"Children of Apocalyptic Techstep"	2:51
2.	"Four Skinny Indie Kids"	2:35
3.	"You're Hard"	2:13
4.	"On Reaching the Wensum"	3:02
5.	"Moody Chops"	2:39
6.	"Turn a Blind Eye"	2:25
7.	"Split Single with Happy Lounge Labelmates"	2:11
8.	"A Country Practice"	6:34
9.	"Secret Gig"	3:06
10.	"Soft Verges"	5:37
11.	"Multitude"	2:46
12.	"Ready Steady Goa"	3:36
13.	"Keeping Two Chevrons Apart"	1:50

== Notes ==
- The album title is a parody of a phrase associated with The Beatles, "Four lads who shook the world", referring instead to the band's origin in Wirral.
- Techstep is a subgenre of drum and bass that was popular in the late 1990s.
- Wensum is a river in Norfolk.
- A split single is a single which includes tracks by two or more separate artists.
- A Country Practice was a multi-Logie award-winning Australian television serial/drama series 1981–93.
- Goa is a state located in the southwestern region of India, formerly a Portuguese colony, known as a destination for hippies.
- "Keeping Two Chevrons Apart" refers to the official UK motorway road sign "Keep Apart 2 Chevrons", advising drivers of safe distances between vehicles; the song title is quoted in "Lord Hereford's Knob" on the 2008 album CSI:Ambleside.
