= Back Again in the DHSS =

Studio album by Half Man Half Biscuit
- Released: 1987
- Recorded: November 1985 – August 1986
- Genre: Post-punk
- Label: Probe Plus Probe 8
- Producer: The Bald Brothers, Dale Griffin

Half Man Half Biscuit chronology
The Trumpton Riots EP (1986)	Back Again in the DHSS (1987)	ACD (1989)

Professional ratings
Review scores
Source	Rating
AllMusic	4.5/5 stars
Sputnikmusic	4.5/5 stars

Back Again in the DHSS is the second album by UK rock band Half Man Half Biscuit, released in 1987.

The album was released after the band had split up (in late 1986; it reformed in 1990), and comprised Peel Sessions along with some new songs.

"Dickie Davies Eyes" b/w "I Left My Heart in Papworth General" and "The Bastard Son of Dean Friedman" (12" only) had been released as a single in September 1986 and reached no.86 in the UK singles charts.

Some of the tracks were subsequently re-released on the compact disc ACD in 1989.

== Track listing ==
Back Again in the DHSS

1. "The Best Things in Life"
2. "D'Ye Ken Ted Moult?"
3. "Reasons to Be Miserable (Part 10)"
4. "Rod Hull Is Alive - Why?"
5. "Dickie Davies Eyes"
6. "The Bastard Son of Dean Friedman"
7. "I Was a Teenage Armchair Honved Fan"
8. "Arthur's Farm"
9. "All I Want for Christmas Is a Dukla Prague Away Kit"
10. "The Trumpton Riots" (7" remix)
11. "I Hate Nerys Hughes (from the Heart)" (live) (cassette only)
