= The Voltarol Years =

Studio album by Half Man Half Biscuit
- Released: 25 February 2022
- Genre: Post-punk
- Length: 44:03
- Label: R. M. Qualtrough

Half Man Half Biscuit chronology
No-One Cares About Your Creative Hub So Get Your Fuckin' Hedge Cut (2018)	The Voltarol Years (2022)	All Asimov and No Fresh Air (2025)

The Voltarol Years is the fifteenth album by Wirral-based rock band Half Man Half Biscuit, released on 25 February 2022 on the band's own R. M. Qualtrough label. It is their first album release since Probe Plus founder Geoff Davies announced his retirement and the shuttering of the label.

Its songs cover themes of class, football and Catholicism. Most of the songs are heavily ironic, with the exception of "Slipping the Escort", which is about a woman losing her husband to dementia.

== Track listing ==
No.	Title	Length
1.	"I'm Getting Buried in the Morning"	2:30
2.	"Rogation Sunday's Here Again!"	1:59
3.	"Awkward Sean"	3:10
4.	"Tess of the Dormobiles"	2:24
5.	"Grafting Haddock in the George"	4:04
6.	"Big Man up Front"	2:52
7.	"When I Look at My Baby"	1:08
8.	"Beneath This Broken Headstone (There Lies a Broken Heart)"	1:50
9.	"In a Suffolk Ditch"	4:22
10.	"Persian Rug Sale at the URC"	3:37
11.	"Midnight Mass Murder"	1:57
12.	"Token Covid Song"	3:34
13.	"Slipping the Escort"	4:53
14.	"Oblong of Dreams"	5:43

== Charts ==
Chart performance for The Voltarol Years
Chart (2022)	Peak position
UK Albums (OCC)	37
Scottish Albums (OCC)	10
UK Independent Albums (OCC)	5
