= Cammell Laird Social Club =

Studio album by Half Man Half Biscuit
- Released: 23 September 2002
- Recorded: Frog Studios, Warrington
- Genre: Post-punk, indie rock
- Length: 41:35
- Label: Probe Plus PROBE 52
- Producer: Mark Walker (engineer)

Half Man Half Biscuit chronology
Editor's Recommendation (2001)	Cammell Laird Social Club (2002)	Saucy Haulage Ballads (2003)

Professional ratings
Review scores
Source	Rating
Allmusic	4/5 stars

Cammell Laird Social Club is the ninth album released by Birkenhead-based UK rock band Half Man Half Biscuit, in September 2002.

== Critical reception ==
- Stewart Mason, AllMusic: "Cammell Laird Social Club is proof that for all their supposed indolence, Half Man Half Biscuit remain one of the sharpest and most satisfying bands in the U.K. indie scene".

== Track listing ==
No.	Title	Length
1.	"The Light at the End of the Tunnel (Is the Light of an Oncoming Train)"	2:32
2.	"When the Evening Sun Goes Down"	3:32
3.	"San Antonio Foam Party"	3:25
4.	"Them's the Vagaries"	3:28
5.	"If I Had Possession over Pancake Day"	2:14
6.	"The Referee's Alphabet"	4:32
7.	"She's in Broadstairs"	3:38
8.	"Tyrolean Knockabout"	3:24
9.	"Breaking News"	3:07
10.	"27 Yards of Dental Floss"	2:36
11.	"Paradise Lost (You're the Reason Why)"	2:28
12.	"Thy Damnation Slumbereth Not"	6:23
13.	"Stavanger Töestub"	0:25

== Notes ==
- The album title parodies those of the film and album Buena Vista Social Club, a 1999 project by Ry Cooder about a group of Cuban musicians
- Cammell Laird, formerly a major shipbuilder, is a company located in Birkenhead.
- Cammell Laird Social Club is a working men's club located in Rock Ferry, near Birkenhead.
- "The Light at the End of the Tunnel (Is the Light of an Oncoming Train)" is a near-quotation from the poem "Since 1939" by the American poet Robert Lowell: "If we see light at the end of the tunnel, it's the light of an oncoming train".
- New Mills is a town in Derbyshire – the refrain parodies Dillerger's Cokane in My Brain: "Knife a fork a bottle and a cork that's the way we spell New York"
- San Antonio is a town in Ibiza, Spain known for its clubbing scene.
- A foam party is a social event in which participants dance to music on a floor covered in several feet of foam.
- "If I Had Possession over Pancake Day" parodies the song "If I Had Possession over Judgment Day" by bluesman Robert Johnson.
- The title "She's in Broadstairs" parodies that of the 1983 song by "She's in Parties" by Bauhaus.
- Broadstairs is a quaint seaside resort near Ramsgate in Kent, England.
- Tyrol is a region of Austria.
- Paradise Lost is an epic poem by John Milton, published 1667.
- The title "Thy Damnation Slumbereth Not" is a quotation from Thomas Hardy's novel Tess of the d'Urbervilles; which is itself an adaptation of the Second Epistle of Peter at 2:3: "Their damnation slumbereth not".
- Stavanger is the fourth largest city in Norway.
