= All Asimov and No Fresh Air =

Studio album by Half Man Half Biscuit
- Released: 13 June 2025
- Studios: Kempston Street Studios, Liverpool
- Genre: Post-punk
- Length: 44:29
- Label: R. M. Qualtrough
- Producers: Chris Taylor and Half Man Half Biscuit

Half Man Half Biscuit chronology
The Voltarol Years (2022)	All Asimov and No Fresh Air (2025)

Singles from All Asimov and No Fresh Air
- 1. "Horror Clowns Are Dickheads" Released: 16 May 2025

All Asimov and No Fresh Air is the sixteenth album by Wirral-based English rock band Half Man Half Biscuit, released on 13 June 2025 on the band's own R. M. Qualtrough label. The opening track, "Horror Clowns Are Dickheads", was released as a single on 16 May 2025. In the first UK Albums Chart update in the week of release, the album was listed at No. 11.

The album is dedicated to Geoff Davies who ran the band's previous record label, Probe Plus prior to his death in 2023.

== Reception ==
The album was given a review of 8 out of 10 by Uncut, saying: "If this record doesn't move you on any level, you really do have a wooden heart." Three songs from the album placed in Dandelion Radio's 2025 Festive Fifty chart, peaking with "Falmouth Electrics" at #3.

== Track listing ==
All lyrics are written by Nigel Blackwell; all music is composed by Blackwell and Neil Crossley.

All Asimov and No Fresh Air track listing
No.	Title	Length
1.	"Horror Clowns Are Dickheads"	2:24
2.	"Goodbye Sam, Hello Samaritans"	2:50
3.	"Rawlplugs of Yesteryear (Breaking the States)"	3:40
4.	"The Bliss of the Hereafter"	3:09
5.	"McCalliog and His Hens"	3:32
6.	"Record Store Day"	3:19
7.	"I'm Going Out of My Mind Trying to Get Into Yours"	2:35
8.	"No-One Likes a Polymath" (featuring Matilda Hodge)	3:40
9.	"Don't Get Me Wrong Yvonne"	3:38
10.	"Birmos in the Cowshed"	3:00
11.	"Falmouth Electrics"	3:50
12.	"Jack's Been to the National"	4:04
13.	"Possible Side Effects"	4:48
Total length:		44:29

== Personnel ==
Credits adapted from Tidal.

=== Half Man Half Biscuit ===
- Karl Benson – production
- Nigel Blackwell – vocals, guitar, production
- Neil Crossley – bass guitar, guitar, background vocals, production
- Carl Henry – drums, production

=== Additional contributors ===
- Chris Taylor – production and engineering
- Matilda Hodge – violin on "No-One Likes a Polymath"
- J'Accusi – sleeve design

== Charts ==
Chart performance for All Asimov and No Fresh Air
Chart (2025)	Peak position
Scottish Albums (Official Charts)	8
UK Albums (Official Charts)	64
UK Independent Albums (Official Charts)	4
