= Some Call It Godcore =

Studio album by Half Man Half Biscuit
- Released: 1995
- Label: Probe Plus

Half Man Half Biscuit chronology
This Leaden Pall (1993)	Some Call It Godcore (1995)	Eno Collaboration (1996)

Professional ratings
Review scores
Source	Rating
Allmusic	3.5/5 stars

Some Call It Godcore is the fifth album released by UK rock band Half Man Half Biscuit in 1995.

== Track listing ==
1. "Sensitive Outsider"
2. "Fretwork Homework"
3. "Faithlift"
4. "Song for Europe"
5. "Even Men with Steel Hearts"
6. "£24.99 from Argos"
7. "Sponsoring the Moshpits"
8. "Fear My Wraith"
9. "Styx Gig (Seen by My Mates Coming Out of A)"
10. "Friday Night and the Gates Are Low"
11. "I, Trog"
12. "Tour Jacket with Detachable Sleeves"
