= Voyage to the Bottom of the Road =

Studio album by Half Man Half Biscuit
- Released: 18 July 1997
- Genre: Post-punk
- Length: 43:07
- Label: Probe Plus Probe 46CD
- Producer: Half Man Half Biscuit and Geoff Davies

Half Man Half Biscuit chronology
Eno Collaboration (1996)	Voyage to the Bottom of the Road (1997)	Four Lads Who Shook the Wirral (1998)

Professional ratings
Review scores
Source	Rating
AllMusic	3.5/5 stars
NME	2/10
Select	4/5

Voyage to the Bottom of the Road is the sixth album by Birkenhead-based UK rock band Half Man Half Biscuit, released July 1997.

== Critical reception ==
- Stewart Mason, AllMusic: "Voyage to the Bottom of the Road is a surprising and entertaining mid-career reinvention conceptually similar to the Mekons' mid–'80s turn to country music".
- Ian Fortnam, NME: "The Biscuits' hamfisted post-punk drivel [...] is simply desperate. As usual, the song titles are invariably superior to the actual songs [...], and their lamentable lyrics have far more in common with Rambo than Rimbaud. Ultimately, Half Man Half Biscuit make the kind of music which can only be made by middle-aged men with extremely time-consuming, yet deeply unfulfilling day jobs."
- Ian Harrison, Select: "It would be bootless to try and list all the joys this LP affords, but it makes Beck sound like Michael Bolton."

== Track listing ==
No.	Title	Length
1.	"A Shropshire Lad"	2:16
2.	"Bad Review"	3:45
3.	"Eno Collaboration (Remix)"	4:08
4.	"Dead Men Don't Need Season Tickets"	3:46
5.	"Deep House Victims Minibus Appeal"	2:53
6.	"C.A.M.R.A. Man"	3:14
7.	"P.R.S. Yearbook – Quick the Drawbridge"	2:56
8.	"Tonight Matthew I'm Going to Be with Jesus"	3:45
9.	"Song of Encouragement for the Orme Ascent"	2:29
10.	"Monmore, Hare's Running"	3:19
11.	"ITMA"	3:17
12.	"He Who Would Valium Take"	1:50
13.	"See That My Bike's Kept Clean"	3:19
14.	"Paintball's Coming Home"	2:10

== Notes ==
- The album title parodies that of the U.S. TV series Voyage to the Bottom of the Sea.
- A Shropshire Lad is an 1896 collection of poems by A. E. Housman.
- An earlier version of "Eno Collaboration" was released on the 1996 EP Eno Collaboration.
- Deep house is a subgenre of house music.
- "C.A.M.R.A. Man" had previously been released on the 1996 EP Eno Collaboration.
- C.A.M.R.A. is the Campaign for Real Ale, an independent voluntary consumer organisation headquartered in St Albans, England, which promotes real ale, real cider and the traditional British pub.
- P.R.S. is the Performing Right Society, a UK copyright collection society and performance rights organisation.
- Great Orme is a prominent limestone headland on the north coast of Wales.
- Monmore Green Stadium is a greyhound racing track located in Wolverhampton, England.
- ITMA (AKA It's That Man Again) was a BBC radio comedy programme which ran from 1939 to 1949.
- "He Who Would Valium Take" parodies the hymn "He Who Would Valiant Be" by John Bunyan.
- Valium is a medication of the benzodiazepine family that typically produces a calming effect.
- "See That My Bike's Kept Clean" reworks the blues song "See That My Grave Is Kept Clean", first recorded in 1927 by Blind Lemon Jefferson.
- The title "Paintball's Coming Home" parodies the line "Football's Coming Home" in "Three Lions", the official anthem of the England football team for the 1996 European Championships. The latter song looks back nostalgically to England's victory over Germany in the 1966 World Cup final. In 1996, England lost to Germany in the semifinal on penalties.
- Paintball is a live-action game in which players attempt to tag opponents with dye-filled projectiles.
