= 25th Sony Radio Academy Awards =

The 25th Sony Radio Academy Awards were held on 30 April 2007 at the Grosvenor House Hotel, Park Lane in London. There were 30 categories of award and three special awards.

== Programme awards and winners ==
Category	Gold	Silver	Bronze
The Breakfast Show Award	The Today Programme (BBC Radio 4)	5 Live Breakfast (BBC Radio 5 Live)	Toolan in the Morning (Key 103 Manchester)
The Music Programme Award	The Mark Radcliffe Show (BBC Radio 2)	Zane Lowe (BBC Radio 1)	Popworld Radio (4Radio)
The Specialist Music Programme Award	Friction (BBC Asian Network)	The Freak Zone (BBC 6 Music)	Westwood (BBC Radio 1)
The News and Current Affairs Programme Award	5 Live Breakfast (BBC Radio 5 Live)	The Today Programme (BBC Radio 4)	Real News at Five (Real Radio Yorkshire)
The Sports Programme Award	Sportsweek (BBC Radio 5 Live)	5 Live Sport (BBC Radio 5 Live)	The Pain of the Game (BBC Radio Scotland)
The Speech Programme Award	The Reunion (BBC Radio 4)	PM (BBC Radio 4)	The Jeremy Vine Show (BBC Radio 2)
The Interactive Programme Award	PM (BBC Radio 4)	The Big Brum Breakfast with Elliott & Caroline (BRMB)	Scott Mills (BBC Radio 1)
The Entertainment Award	The Chris Evans Show (BBC Radio 2)	Heart Breakfast with Jamie Theakston & Harriet Scott (London’s Heart 106.2)	Bowie @ Breakfast (Clyde 1)

== Personality awards and winners ==
Category	Gold	Silver	Bronze
The Music Broadcaster of the Year	Colin Murray (BBC Radio 1)	Steve Lamacq (BBC 6 Music)	Andi Durrant (Galaxy Radio)
The Music Radio Personality of the Year	Chris Evans (BBC Radio 2)	Andy Kershaw (BBC Radio 3)	Mark Radcliffe (BBC Radio 2)
The News Journalist of the Year	John Humphrys (BBC Radio 4)	Mike Thomson (BBC Radio 4)	Key 103 & Magic 1152 News Team (Key 103 & Magic 1152 Manchester)
The Speech Broadcaster of the Year	Eddie Nestor (BBC London 94.9)	John Humphrys (BBC Radio 4)	Anna Raeburn (LBC 97.3fm)

Category	Gold	Nominee(s)
The Station Programmer of the Year	Francis Currie (Heart Network)	Richard Maddock (Radio City 96.7), Ric Blaxill (BBC 6 Music)

== Production awards and winners ==
Category	Gold	Silver	Bronze
The Drama Award	Lorilei (BBC Radio 4)	Breakfast with Mugabe (BBC Radio 3)	The Cairo Trilogy (BBC Radio 4)
The Comedy Award	1966 And All That (BBC Radio 4)	Giles Wemmbley Hogg Geht Zum FussballWeltmeisterschaft Weg! (BBC Radio 4)	Armando Iannucci's Charm Offensive (BBC Radio 4)
The Feature Award	Radio Ballads 2006 - The Song Of Steel (BBC Radio 2)	Don’t Hang Up - Night Lines (BBC Radio 4)	Fighting To Be Normal (BBC Radio 4)
The Musical Special Award	Malcolm McLaren’s Musical Map of London (BBC Radio 2)	The Poet, The Rocker: The Phil Lynott Story (BBC Radio 2)	The Invisible Man: The Rod Temperton Story (Part One) (BBC Radio 2)
The News Feature Award	Letters from Guantanamo Bay (BBC Radio 4)	Love, ‘Honour’ and Obey (BBC Asian Network)	Aberfan: Forty Years On (Real Radio Wales)
The Breaking News Award	The London Tornado (BBC London 94.9)	Test Match Collapse (BBC Radio 5 Live Sports Extra)	Terror Alert (BBC Radio 4)
The Live Event Coverage Award	The Alan Shearer Testimonial (Magic 1152)	The Day That Changed The World (BBC Nations & Regions)	Notting Hill Carnival (Kiss 100)
The Community Award	The Plot (BBC Radio Berkshire)	Bare All 06 - Safer Sex Campaign (BBC Radio 1 & 1Xtra)	Radio Ballads 2006 - 30 Years Of Conflict (BBC Radio 2)
The Promo Award	The Ashes (BBC Radio 5 Live Sports Extra)	Kerrang! Radio Valentines (Kerrang! Radio)	Brunel 200 (BBC Radio Bristol)
The Competition Award	Who's Calling Christian? (Virgin Radio)	Hairy Fairy (Pirate FM)	The BH Jam Spoon (BBC Radio 4)
The Station Imaging Award	Planet Rock	Talksport	96.3 Radio Aire
The Internet Programme Award	Firin' Squad Unsigned Podcast	The Insight Show (Insight Radio)	My Streets - A Rudeboy's Guide to Peckham (4Radio)

== Station awards and winners ==
Category	Gold	Nominee(s)
Station of the Year with a potential audience of under 300,000	Isle Of Wight Radio	Moray Firth Radio (MFR), Silk FM
Station of the Year with a potential audience of 300,000 – 1 million	BBC Radio Derby	Lincs FM 102.2, BBC Hereford & Worcester
Station of the Year with a potential audience of 1 million plus	Radio City 96.7	Kerrang! Radio, BBC Radio Ulster
Digital Terrestrial Station of the Year	GaydarRadio	FUN Radio, BBC Asian Network
UK Station of the Year	Classic FM	BBC Radio 2, BBC Radio 1

== Special awards ==
- The Gold Award — Paul Gambaccini
- The Broadcasters' Broadcaster Award - John Peel
- The Lifetime Achievement Award - Tony Butler
