= W. C. Sellar =

Scottish humorist (1898–1951)

- Born: Walter Carruthers Sellar; 27 December 1898
- Died: 11 June 1951 (aged 52)
- Occupations: Teacher and writer
- Notable work: 1066 and All That (1930)

Walter Carruthers Sellar (27 December 1898 – 11 June 1951) was a Scottish humourist who wrote for the magazine Punch. He is known best for the 1930 book 1066 and All That, a farcical guide to "all the history you can remember," which he wrote together with R. J. Yeatman.

== Early life ==
Sellar was born at Golspie in Sutherland, the son of Patrick Plenderleath Sellar, a farmer, who was a son of Patrick Sellar who had taken a major role in the Highland clearances and was the father of William Young Sellar, a Scottish classical scholar.

He won a scholarship to Fettes College in Edinburgh, where he was Head Boy in 1917. He quit school at the height of the First World War, and joined the British Army. Having attended an Officer Cadet Unit, he was commissioned in the King's Own Scottish Borderers as a second lieutenant on 31 October 1917. He earned a degree in modern history at Oriel College, Oxford (which, as recorded in 1066 and All That, was awarded by means of an aegrotat in 1922).

It was at Oriel that he met his contemporary Robert Yeatman, and began a lifelong friendship with him. Although the two produced substantial work together, they were entirely different personalities: Sellar was somewhat shy and introverted, although he enjoyed acting. He wrote melancholy poetry in addition to humour.

== Teaching career ==
After quitting Oriel, Sellar worked as a schoolmaster at his old school Fettes College, quitting in 1928 when he relocated to Great Marlow in Buckinghamshire in the hope of becoming a full-time writer.

However, the financial burdens of bringing up two daughters caused him to take a job at Canford School in Dorset from the start of the school year in 1929, and he taught at Charterhouse School from 1932 until his death. At first he taught history, but later taught English and became Housemaster of Daviesites from 1939.

During the period 1946-1950 he was again teaching history at Charterhouse, and even during his late years Sellar retained his sense of humour, for example putting on as the school play one year two trials. The first, in which he was both the King of Spain and the Lord Chief Justice of England, was the trial of Christopher Columbus (played by the Head Boy) for the heinous crime of discovering America. The second, in his words "the most important negligence trial in history" was of course the trial of Guy Fawkes "in that he did fail to blow up the Houses of Parliament".

== Writing ==
Sellar had begun to contribute to Punch in 1925 when three humorous short stories of his were published (he also contributed to other journals about this time). His collaboration with his old University colleague Yeatman, who was also writing for Punch, seems to have begun in 1928 during his period out of teaching. The first part of 1066 And All That appeared in Punch on 10 September 1930, taking its title from Robert Graves' autobiography Good-Bye to All That. Sellar's contribution is particularly noted in the comic exaggerations and name confusions; his knowledge of English literature also inspired the book's many literary allusions and pastiches.

After completing the book, Sellar worked with Yeatman again on a sequel, And Now All This, a parody of general knowledge, including subjects as diverse as geography, knitting and topology.

The 1933 book Horse Nonsense was credited to the two but is largely the work of Yeatman, while Garden Rubbish And Other Country Bumps is also credited to the two but largely Sellar's work.

== Publications ==
- 1066 and All That (1930), ISBN 0-413-61880-3
- And Now All This (1932), ISBN 0-413-56080-5
- Horse Nonsense (1933), ISBN 0-413-73990-2
- Garden Rubbish and other Country Bumps (1936), ISBN 0-417-02050-3

== Sources ==
- Summerson, Henry. "Sellar, Walter Carruthers". Oxford Dictionary of National Biography (online ed.). Oxford University Press. doi:10.1093/ref:odnb/39442. (Subscription, Wikipedia Library access or UK public library membership required.)
