= CSI:Ambleside =

Studio album by Half Man Half Biscuit
- Released: 28 April 2008
- Genre: Post-punk
- Length: 43:53
- Label: Probe Plus PROBE 61

Half Man Half Biscuit chronology
Achtung Bono (2005)	CSI:Ambleside (2008)	90 Bisodol (Crimond) (2011)

Professional ratings
Review scores
Source	Rating
Allmusic	3.5/5 stars
Bearded	4/5 stars
Drowned in Sound	9/10 stars

CSI:Ambleside is the eleventh album by Wirral-based UK rock band Half Man Half Biscuit (HMHB), released in April 2008.

== Critical reception ==
- Stewart Mason, AllMusic: "CSI: Ambleside [...] is not quite up to those standards [namely, of Achtung Bono], but it's yet another solid outing".
- Dom Passantino, Drowned in Sound: "CSI: Ambleside is one of the peaks in an already unimpeachable back catalogue because it sticks to what makes HMHB such a great band". [...] This isn't the greatest album of HMHB's career, but it's certainly the album that best illustrates what makes them great".

in 2012, Tim Jonze singled out "National Shite Day" for special praise, calling it an "extended moan about the miseries of British life" which is "hilarious and depressingly true. Because sometimes the sum total of global suffering seems like nothing compared to the pain of being shoved off the pavement by an idiot.".

== Track listing ==
No.	Title	Length
1.	"Evening of Swing (Has Been Cancelled)"	3:27
2.	"Bad Losers on Yahoo! Chess"	3:18
3.	"Took Problem Chimp to Ideal Home Show"	4:46
4.	"Ode to Joyce"	2:18
5.	"Blue Badge Abuser"	2:48
6.	"Totnes Bickering Fair"	2:40
7.	"King of Hi-Vis"	3:28
8.	"Lord Hereford's Knob"	3:51
9.	"On the 'Roids"	3:59
10.	"Petty Sessions"	1:11
11.	"Little in the Way of Sunshine"	3:07
12.	"Give Us Bubblewrap"	2:49
13.	"National Shite Day"	6:25

== Notes ==
- CSI (i.e. Crime Scene Investigation) is a media franchise of American television programmes.
- Ambleside is a picturesque small town in Cumbria, North West England.
- Swing is a dance form which was popular 1920s – 1940s.
- Yahoo! Chess is an online chess game which was discontinued in March 2014.
- Ideal Home Show is an annual exhibition in London relating to appliances for and the design of modern houses, instituted in 1908.
- The title "Ode to Joyce" parodies that of the "Ode to Joy" in Beethoven's ninth symphony.
- A Blue Badge is a parking permit for the disabled.
- Totnes is a market town in Devon, South West England.
- Hi-Vis refers to high visibility clothing, as worn by staff at sporting events and music festivals.
- Lord Hereford's Knob (AKA Twmpa) is a mountain in south-east Wales.
- 'Roids are anabolic steroids, drugs misused for bodybuilding purposes, one of whose side effects can be "roid rage".
- Petty Sessions are a former type of magistrates' court in England. The tune is the "Hokey cokey", a folk dance dating back to at least 1826 and revived as a music hall novelty song and dance in the 1940s.
- The dismal TVM mentioned in National Shite Day (a "tug-of-love-custody-battle" in which Stockard Channing "held sway"), was most likely Jack (2004).
