= Robert Julian Yeatman =

British humourist (1897–1968)

- Born: 15 July 1897; Chelsea, London
- Died: 13 July 1968 (aged 70); South Kensington, London
- Occupation: Humourist
- Notable work: 1066 and All That

Robert Julian Yeatman (15 July 1897 – 13 July 1968) was a British humorist who wrote for Punch. He is best known for the book 1066 and All That, a tongue-in-cheek guide to "all the history you can remember", which he wrote with W. C. Sellar in 1930. Yeatman was born in Chelsea, London. He spent some of his early years in Porto, the principal city and port of northern Portugal, where his father worked as a port wine merchant, a family business connected with Taylor's Port. From 1911 he was educated at Marlborough College. In World War I he was commissioned into the Royal Field Artillery. Serving in France, he won the Military Cross and was severely wounded. After the war he attended Oriel College, Oxford, where he met Sellar. Yeatman then worked as a journalist before becoming advertising manager for Kodak Ltd.

When asked to convert his BA from Oxford into an MA, Yeatman could not find the fee owing to debt, and hence he is recorded in 1066 and All That as "Failed M.A., etc. Oxon".

With ambitions to be a writer, Yeatman contributed humorous pieces to Punch from 1926, with 1066 and All That published in 1930, which was an immediate success. Three further joint ventures with Sellar followed: And Now All This (1932), Horse Nonsense (1933), and Garden Rubbish (1936), all selling well but without the popular success of 1066.

Yeatman rejoined the army in 1940, serving as a captain in the Royal Artillery, then working for the Ministry of Information from 1943 until 1949. Afterwards he was employed as a copywriter, retiring in 1962.

== Bibliography ==
All of the following books were co-authored with W. C. Sellar:

- 1066 and All That (1930) ISBN 0-413-61880-3
- And Now All This (1932) ISBN 0-413-56080-5
- Horse Nonsense (1933) ISBN 0-413-73990-2
- Garden Rubbish and other Country Bumps (1936) ISBN 0-417-02050-3
