= Back in the DHSS =

Studio album by Half Man Half Biscuit
- Released: 7 October 1985
- Recorded: The Vulcan Studios, Waterloo Road, Liverpool
- Genre: Post-punk
- Length: 29:16
- Label: Probe Plus PROBE4
- Producer: Dave Treble

Half Man Half Biscuit chronology
Back in the DHSS (1985)	The Trumpton Riots EP (1986)

Professional ratings
Review scores
Source	Rating
AllMusic	3/5 stars
Uncut (2008)	4/5 stars

Back in the DHSS is the first album released by the UK rock band Half Man Half Biscuit (HMHB), in 1985.

The album's title puns on that of the 1968 song "Back in the U.S.S.R." by The Beatles: referring to the high unemployment levels at the time of the album's release (the DHSS, Department of Health and Social Security, was the British institution which distributed unemployment benefit).

It was re-released in 2003, compiled with their first EP, The Trumpton Riots EP.

== Background ==
In 1984, Half Man Half Biscuit started rehearsing at the Vulcan Studios in Liverpool, where Nigel Blackwell was working as the caretaker. One of the people he had got to know was building an 8-track studio in an upstairs room and hired Half Man Half Biscuit for testing the sound quality. Back in the DHSS was recorded for £40 as a result of Blackwell having secured a cut-price deal for the band.

According to the band's official biography, the first label to which Neil Crossley and Nigel Blackwell offered their first album was Skysaw Records in Wallasey, who "said they would love to release it but the swearing was a financial risk". Then Skeleton Records "didn't really do anything except smile and ask if they could use the name as a label to put out a single by Instant Agony ((Blackwell and Crossley) said yes, not expecting any publicity of their own)". Alan Erasmus of Factory Records "chuckled encouragingly and said it was probably unlikely anything would come about."

Geoff Davies of Probe Plus took the original tape and a couple of days later said that he would like to release it. Reportedly, Geoff's then wife, Annie, was a major influence, "being more in tune with the references". The band recorded a few more songs at Vulcan, and the resultant Back In The DHSS LP was sent to John Peel, who "delighted in the savage mockery of minor British celebrities, all wrapped up in tales of the everyday tedium that is life on the dole". The LP topped the UK Indie Chart to become the biggest-selling independent record of 1986.

== Track listing ==
No.	Title	Length
1.	"God Gave Us Life"	4:20
2.	"Fuckin' 'Ell It's Fred Titmus"	2:40
3.	"Sealclubbing"	3:25
4.	"99% of Gargoyles Look Like Bob Todd"	4:39
5.	"Time Flies By (When You're the Driver of a Train)"	2:39
6.	"I Hate Nerys Hughes (From the Heart)"	3:49
7.	"The Len Ganley Stance"	3:45
8.	"Venus in Flares"	2:31
9.	"I Love You Because (You Look Like Jim Reeves)"	3:15
10.	"Reflections in a Flat"	3:24

=== Cassette ===
1. "Busy Little Market Town"
2. "God Gave Us Life"
3. "'Fuckin' 'Ell It's Fred Titmus'"
4. "Sealclubbing"
5. "99% of Gargoyles Look Like Bob Todd"
6. "Time Flies By (When You're the Driver of a Train)"
7. "I Hate Nerys Hughes - From the Heart"
8. "The Len Ganley Stance"
9. "Venus in Flares"
10. "I Love You Because (You Look Like Jim Reeves)"
11. "Reflections in a Flat"
12. "I Left My Heart in Papworth General"

=== 2003 rerelease ===
1. "Busy Little Market Town"
2. "God Gave Us Life"
3. "Fuckin' 'Ell It's Fred Titmus"
4. "Sealclubbing"
5. "99% of Gargoyles Look Like Bob Todd"
6. "Time Flies By (When You're the Driver of a Train)"
7. "I Hate Nerys Hughes (From the Heart)"
8. "The Len Ganley Stance"
9. "Venus in Flares"
10. "I Love You Because (You Look Like Jim Reeves)"
11. "Reflections in a Flat"
12. "I Left My Heart in Papworth General"
13. "Architecture and Morality Ted and Alice"
14. "Albert Hammond Bootleg"
15. "1966 and All That"
16. "The Trumpton Riots"
17. "All I Want for Christmas Is a Dukla Prague Away Kit"

The above is the correct song order; the track listing on the 2003 release was incorrect, placing "The Trumpton Riots" at number 13, so putting the last five songs into an incorrect order.

Tracks 13–17 were first released in 1986 on The Trumpton Riots EP.
