= Half Man Half Biscuit =

English rock band

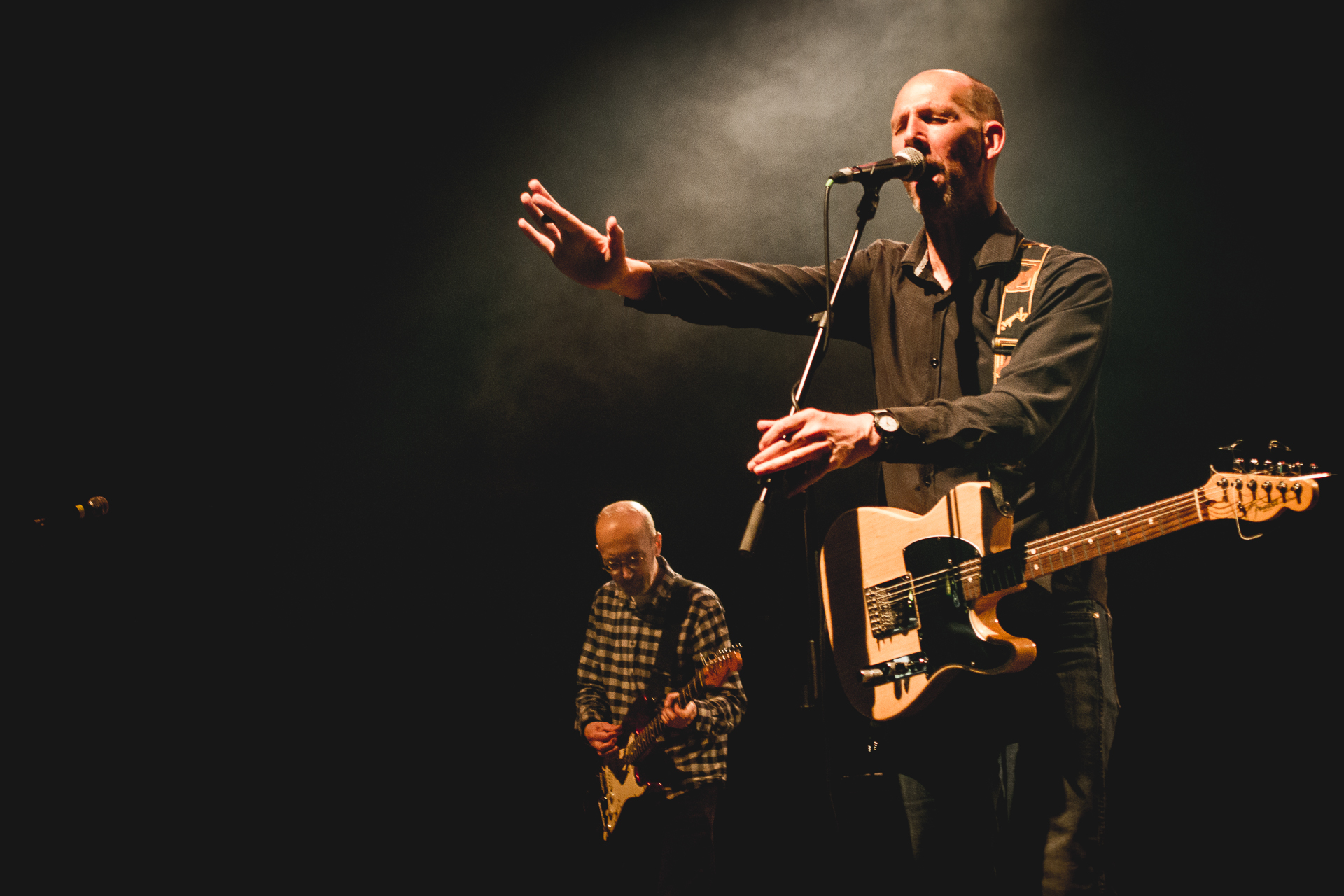
- Nigel Blackwell (right) and Ken Hancock performing in 2015

Background information
- Origin: Birkenhead, Merseyside, England
- Genres: Indie rock, post-punk
- Years active: 1984–1986, 1990–present
- Labels: Probe Plus, R. M. Qualtrough
- Members: Nigel Blackwell; Neil Crossley; Carl Henry; Karl Benson
- Past members: Simon Blackwell; David Lloyd; Paul Wright; Carl Alty; Ian Jackson; Ken Hancock
- Website: halfmanhalfbiscuit.uk

Half Man Half Biscuit are an English rock band, formed in 1984 in Birkenhead, Merseyside. Known for their satirical, sardonic, and sometimes surreal songs, the band comprises lead singer and guitarist Nigel Blackwell, bassist and singer Neil Crossley, drummer Carl Henry, and guitarist Karl Benson.

The band parodies popular genres, while their lyrics allude to UK popular culture and geography. Within a long career, their best-known songs include "Dickie Davies' Eyes" & "The Trumpton Riots" (1986), "For What Is Chatteris" (2005), "Joy Division Oven Gloves" (2005), and "National Shite Day" (2008).

== History ==
Half Man Half Biscuit were formed by two friends from Birkenhead, guitarist Neil Crossley and singer, guitarist and songwriter Nigel Blackwell. In 1984, when Half Man Half Biscuit were formed, Crossley moved to bass and the two were joined by Nigel's brother Simon Blackwell (lead guitar) and his friend Paul Wright (drums), both previously with a group called Attempted Moustache, presumably named after the album by Loudon Wainwright III. The quartet started to rehearse in the Liverpool-based Vulcan Studios, where they soon turned a five-piece, with David Lloyd now on keyboards.

Their debut album, 1985's Back in the DHSS, topped the UK Indie Chart and reached number 60 in the UK Albums Chart. Its title was a play on the Beatles' "Back in the U.S.S.R." and also a reference to the DHSS, the government department that dealt with the unemployed, Nigel Blackwell having been on unemployment benefits since 1979. The band's first single, "The Trumpton Riots", topped the UK Indies Singles Chart in 1986, and they went on to perform at the Glastonbury Festival. The second single, "Dickie Davies Eyes", also topped the indie chart. In late 1986, the band split up, giving as a reason "musical similarities". The album Back Again in the DHSS, containing previously issued, unreleased and live tracks, followed.

The band reformed in 1990, with a performance at the Reading Festival following, and a new single, "Let's Not", issued before the year was out, followed in 1991 by a collaboration with Margi Clarke on a version of Edith Piaf's "No Regrets". Half Man Half Biscuit were championed by DJ John Peel, for whom they recorded twelve sessions, and it was on his programme in 1990 that the band announced their return. The third album was McIntyre, Treadmore and Davitt, released in October 1991. By the time This Leaden Pall was released in 1993, Wright and Lloyd had left the band, with Carl Alty, previously of Joanna, joining on drums. Simon Blackwell left the following year, with Ian S. Jackson joining. Jackson (who later joined Rooney) and Alty (who joined Joyrider) departed in 1996, to be replaced by Ken Hancock (guitar) and Carl Henry (drums).

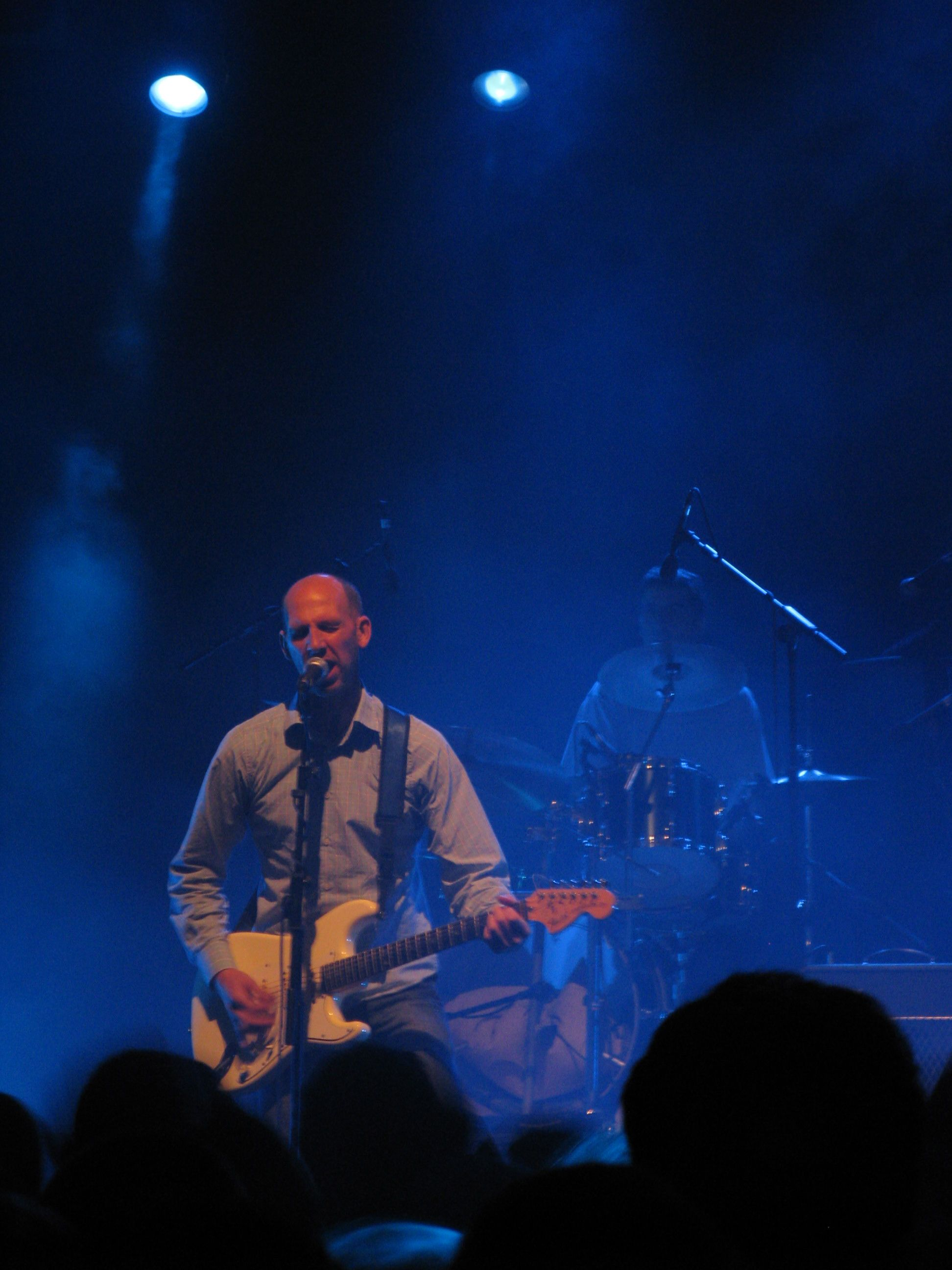
The band performing in 2008

In April 2010, the band's song "Joy Division Oven Gloves" from their 2005 album Achtung Bono was the subject of a Facebook campaign to get it to No. 6 on the chart for 12 April 2010, in response to the rumoured closure of the indie-supporting radio station BBC 6 Music. The song reached No. 56 on 11 April 2010: this was their first UK Singles Chart appearance. It also reached No. 3 in the Official Independent Singles chart the same week, and was No. 1 in the HMV UK Digital Downloads Top 40 Tracks on 16 April, knocking Ultravox's song "Vienna" off the top spot – itself part of a separate Facebook campaign the previous week.

== Reception ==
Andy Kershaw described Half Man Half Biscuit as "One of England's most amazing bands" and "the most authentic British folk band since The Clash". James Dodd on Bido Lito! praised (as many others did) Blackwell's "uncanny way of chronicling two of his greatest passions in life: television and small-town England". Eliza Carthy praised the band for their "pathos disguised with wit and sarcasm", describing Blackwell as a "genius". Journalist Ben Myers has described Blackwell's lyrics as "the antithesis of most rock songs, and iconoclastic in their total avoidance of cliche".

Geoff Davies of Probe Plus recalled that after hearing a test pressing of Back in the D.H.S.S, John Peel said "Geoff, what's this, I've just played the first side of this, what is it, tell me, it's just fantastic and all". Other famous Peel quotes about the band include "I've said it before, a national treasure, there's no question about it. When I die, I want them to be buried with me." (14 August 1996) and "In a decently ordered society, members of Half Man Half Biscuit would be routinely carried shoulder high through the streets of every city they visited" (10 July 1997).

According to music writer Paul Du Noyer: "The genius of Half Man Half Biscuit is that they took just enough of Scouse culture to give themselves an edge, but kept their distance too. From their Wirral bastion they issue occasional dispatches of wry hilarity and downbeat, satirical bite. The songs of their leader, Nigel Blackwell, suggest a very real world of people too educated to be on the dole but too luckless or lazy to be anywhere else. They take a witty revenge on the drivel of popular culture, without denying their fascination with it. They seem flintily incorruptible, and scan the London music media with a mocking eye for cant." English writer Julie Burchill praised their "supremely clever and funny lyrics", and described the band as "punk with a sense of humour and a sense of perspective".

References to Half Man Half Biscuit can be found on episodes of EastEnders, Brookside, Hollyoaks, Men Behaving Badly and Byker Grove, as well as an episode of Football Focus and the BBC serial Elidor. The cricket commentator David 'Bumble' Lloyd often makes reference to songs and lyrics in commentaries, often completely lost on other commentators working with him.

== Discography ==
- Back in the DHSS (1985)
- Back Again in the DHSS (1987)
- McIntyre, Treadmore and Davitt (1991)
- This Leaden Pall (1993)
- Some Call It Godcore (1995)
- Voyage to the Bottom of the Road (1997)
- Four Lads Who Shook the Wirral (1998)
- Trouble over Bridgwater (2000)
- Cammell Laird Social Club (2002)
- Achtung Bono (2005)
- CSI:Ambleside (2008)
- 90 Bisodol (Crimond) (2011)
- Urge for Offal (2014)
- No-One Cares About Your Creative Hub So Get Your Fuckin' Hedge Cut (2018)
- The Voltarol Years (2022)
- All Asimov and No Fresh Air (2025)
