= Urge for Offal =

Studio album by Half Man Half Biscuit
- Released: 20 October 2014
- Genre: Post punk
- Length: 41:27
- Label: Probe Plus PROBE 71
- Producer: Tommy Onehead

Half Man Half Biscuit chronology
| 90 Bisodol (Crimond) (2011) | Urge for Offal (2014) | No-One Cares About Your Creative Hub So Get Your Fuckin' Hedge Cut (2018) |

Urge for Offal is the thirteenth album by UK Wirral-based rock band Half Man Half Biscuit, released 20 October 2014 on Probe Plus Records. The album reached #68 on the UK album chart.

Nigel Blackwell of Half Man Half Biscuit has discussed the album in one of his rare interviews.

The cover art depicts Neil Crossley, the band's bass player, and a ride from an obsolete decommissioned merry-go-round.

== Track listing ==
| No. | Title | Length |
|---|---|---|
| 1. | "Westward Ho! – Massive Letdown" | 3:22 |
| 2. | "This One's for Now" | 3:20 |
| 3. | "Baguette Dilemma for the Booker Prize Guy" | 3:00 |
| 4. | "My Outstretched Arms" | 2:59 |
| 5. | "The Bane of Constance" | 3:24 |
| 6. | "Theme Tune for Something or Other" | 1:19 |
| 7. | "False Grit" | 2:29 |
| 8. | "Old Age Killed My Teenage Bride" | 4:01 |
| 9. | "Urge for Offal" | 3:03 |
| 10. | "Stuck up a Hornbeam" | 2:38 |
| 11. | "Adam Boyle Has Cast Lad Rock Aside" | 2:30 |
| 12. | "The Unfortunate Gwatkin" | 4:38 |
| 13. | "Mileage Chart" | 4:44 |

== Critical reception ==
In an early online review, Jon Bryan rated the album 9.5/10, and wrote:

The increased emphasis on guitars means that Urge for Offal is a considerably more accessible album for newcomers to HMHB and that’s no bad thing, as they deserve to finally have recognition as one of the UK’s greatest bands.

In an online review in The Quietus, Luke Slater wrote:

Perhaps the least surprising thing about their thirteenth album is the lack of surprises. Urge For Offal does not represent a new or even vaguely modified HMHB. Nor are there any unexpected turns or diversions of musical style. [...] Musically, things continue where 2011's 90 Bisodol (Crimond) left us. It is fundamentally rocky and occasionally loud, with prominent bass aplenty. There are almost all of the elements you would expect to find in a HMHB album. Various football references, the odd improbably surreal yarn, and some mentions of cycling, too. [...] Though Urge For Offal may feel a bit like Half Man Half Biscuit by-numbers, it acts as a reminder of what they represent. And that is something that [sic] be celebrated, albeit quietly.

In an online review in Louder Than War magazine, Mark Whitby wrote:

Urge for Offal doesn’t just avoid disappointment – it carves out its own very distinctive niche in the history of one of our most treasured bands.

In December 2014, readers of The Guardian voted Urge for Offal best album of the year even though that newspaper had never reviewed or even mentioned it.

== Cultural background ==
As is usual with Half Man Half Biscuit, the songs contain multiple references to both serious and popular culture, to sport, and to local geography; among other things. Those identified include:

"Westward Ho! – Massive Letdown"

- Westward Ho!, a large seaside village and resort in Devon, England
- Blue flag status, a certification by the Foundation for Environmental Education that a beach, marina or sustainable boating tourism operator meets its standards
- Claw crane, a type of arcade game
- Northam, a small town to the east of Westward Ho!
- Devon cream tea, a light meal taken in the afternoon, consisting of tea accompanied by scones, clotted cream and jam
- Crazy golf, an offshoot of the sport of golf focusing solely on the putting aspect of its parent game, often found at seaside resorts
- Frank Ifield (born 1937), English-born Australian easy listening and country music singer
- Bacup, a town in Lancashire, England
- Phoebus, a title of the Greek god Apollo, here used as a poetic name for the Sun

"This One's for Now"

- Corner, a method of restarting play in the game of association football which rarely leads to a goal
- Mr Universe, one of several bodybuilding contests
- Delph, a village bureaucratically located in the Metropolitan Borough of Oldham, Greater Manchester, England but actually in Yorkshire
- DFS, a British furniture retailer
- TNS: The New Saints F.C., an association football club which plays in the Welsh Premier League
- The Blob, a public house said to be one of the least pleasant in Liverpool
- Vengloš: Jozef Vengloš (1936–2021), former Slovak football player and coach
- Rock Ferry, an area of Birkenhead, Wirral, England
- "You’re so beige, I bet you think this song’s about someone else", a parody of lines from Carly Simon's 1972 song "You're So Vain"
- Standard Liège, a Belgian top-flight football club
- Gerry Gow (1952–2016), Scottish footballer who played for Bristol City in the 1970s
- "As told to a boil on the cab driver's neck", a quotation from the song "Fun Day in the Park" on the 2011 album 90 Bisodol (Crimond) by Half Man Half Biscuit

"Baguette Dilemma for the Booker Prize Guy"

- Booker Prize, a literary prize awarded each year for the best original novel written in the English language and published in the UK
- Aloysius Umbongo N’Danga O’Reilly, a fictional personage equipped with calamity powder
  - Aloysius, a masculine given name, a Latinisation of the names Louis, Lewis, Luis, Luigi, Ludwig, and so on
  - Um Bongo, a brand of juice drinks produced by Sumol + Compal, first produced in 1983 by Nestlé (under the Libby's brand) for consumption in the United Kingdom, later licensed for production in Portugal
  - O'Reilly, a surname of Irish origin
- Hoylake, a seaside town within the Metropolitan Borough of Wirral, Merseyside, England
- The Red Rocks, a geological feature near Hoylake
- Hilbre, a tidal island and Site of Special Scientific Interest near Hoylake, access to which is hampered by quicksand which can be a death trap for the unwary and for over-exuberant civic dignitaries
- Beadle, a minor official who carries out various civil, educational or ceremonial duties for civic dignitaries
- Lord Gort VC (1886–1946), British and Anglo-Irish soldier who commanded the British Expeditionary Force which was sent to France in the first year of the Second World War and was evacuated from Dunkirk
- Berwyn, an isolated and sparsely populated area of moorland located in the northeast of Wales
- RNLI, the Royal National Lifeboat Institution, the largest charity that saves lives at sea around the coasts of the British Isles, operators of lifeboat station

"My Outstretched Arms"

- Thwaite, a village in North Yorkshire

"The Bane of Constance"

- Victory V, a British brand of liquorice-flavoured lozenges
- Eintracht Oblong, a fictional football club
- Sagittarius, a constellation and astrological sign
- Tibor, a masculine given name found throughout Europe
- Heswall Flower Club, an organisation based in Heswall, a town in Wirral, Merseyside, England
- Iron Age, the period generally occurring after the Bronze Age, marked by the prevalent use of iron
- Cagoule, a lightweight (usually unlined) weatherproof raincoat or anorak with a hood, often knee-length
- Viceroy: Vauxhall Viceroy, an executive car produced 1977–82
- Back nine, holes 10–18 on an 18-hole golf course
- Midge Ure (born 1953), Scottish musician and singer-songwriter
- British Museum, dedicated to human history, art, and culture, located in the Bloomsbury area of London
- Halfords, a British retailer of car parts, car enhancement, camping, touring and bicycles

"Theme Tune for Something or Other"

- An instrumental

"False Grit"

- The title parodies that of the 1969 western movie True Grit starring Kim Darby and John Wayne
- Haynes refers to Haynes Manuals, a series of practical manuals relating to the maintenance and repair of automotive vehicles
- Suranne Jones (born 1978), English actress who rose to prominence playing the role of Karen McDonald in the soap opera Coronation Street
- Rodney Ontong (born 1955), South African-born cricketer
- Lynsey de Paul (1948–2014), English singer-songwriter who represented UK in the Eurovision Song Contest 1977 with the song "Rock Bottom"
- Antonine Wall, a turf fortification on stone foundations, built by the Romans across what is now the Central Belt of Scotland, between the Firth of Forth and the Firth of Clyde, begun 142 and completed about 12 years later

"Old Age Killed My Teenage Bride"

- Origin of Species: On the Origin of Species, an 1859 work of scientific literature by Charles Darwin
- King James: King James Version, an English translation of the Christian Bible for the Church of England which was begun in 1604 and which fell from Heaven in 1611
- Dr Forbes: John Forbes (1787–1861), Scottish physician who attended Queen Victoria 1841–61
- Cash in the Attic, a UK BBC TV show 2002–12, which helped you find hidden treasures in your home and then sold them for you at auction.
- Abseil, a controlled descent of a vertical drop, such as a rock face, using a rope

"Urge for Offal"

- Urge for Offal, a fictional band
- Stale Craig, a fictional guitarist who decided he didn't like his brain
- Dean Almond, a fictional drummer
- Mick Exclusion Zone, a fictional vocalist and model maker based in Leicester
- Harwich, a town in Essex, England, one of the Haven ports
- Brawn, a terrine or meat jelly made with flesh from the head of a calf or pig, or less commonly a sheep or cow, often set in aspic
- Alan Gilzean (1938–2018), Scottish professional footballer active in the 1960s and 1970s
- Harsh, a fictional band
- Libby's, a U.S.-based food company known for its canned food including pear halves

"Stuck up a Hornbeam"

- Hornbeam, a relatively small hardwood tree in the genus Carpinus
- Mynah bird, a bird in the starling family (Sturnidae), noted for its ability to reproduce sounds, including human speech, when in captivity
- Crewe, a railway town and civil parish within the unitary authority area of Cheshire East and the ceremonial county of Cheshire, England
- Junction 16, on the M6 motorway
- Spork, a hybrid form of cutlery taking the form of a spoon-like shallow scoop with two to four fork tines which can be used for eating soup
- Live at the Apollo, a British stand-up comedy programme performed from the Hammersmith Apollo Theatre in west London
- Zen, a school of Mahayana Buddhism that originated in China during the Tang dynasty as Chán and spread south to Vietnam, northeast to Korea and east to Japan
- Hammerfist, a side-scrolling beat 'em up video game developed by Vivid Image and released in 1990 for the Commodore Amiga, Atari ST, Commodore 64, Amstrad CPC and ZX Spectrum
- DIY: Do it yourself would always be my reply

"Adam Boyle Has Cast Lad Rock Aside"

- The song refers throughout to the 1973 British mystery horror film The Wicker Man and to the locations where it was filmed
- Adam Boyle, a fictional person
- Dumfries and Galloway, a county in southwestern Scotland comprising the historic counties of Dumfriesshire, Wigtownshire and Stewartry of Kirkcubright
- Plockton, a village in the Highlands of Scotland in the county of Ross and Cromarty
- Skye, the largest and most northerly major island in the Inner Hebrides of Scotland
- Union Jack, the national flag of the United Kingdom (Also known as the "Union Flag")
- Epiphone, an American manufacturer of stringed instruments including guitars
- "Much has been said of the strumpets of yore", the first line of the song "Landlord's Daughter" in The Wicker Man
- BBC4, a British television channel which shows a wide variety of programmes including comedy, documentaries, music, international film, original programmes, drama and current affairs
- Beltane, the anglicised name for the Gaelic May Day festival
- Topic: Topic Records, a British folk music record label
- 'Spoons: Wetherspoons, a British pub chain known for cask ale, low prices, long opening hours, no music, and its food
- Mac and Katie Kissoon (born 1943 and 1951 respectively), a male and female vocal duo from Port of Spain, Trinidad, known for bubblegum pop and as backing singers and session musicians
- Creetown, a small seaport town in the Stewartry of Kirkcudbright
- Kirkcudbright, a town and parish in Dumfries and Galloway, Scotland (pronounced kir–coo–bree)
- Gatehouse of Fleet, a town in the civil parish of Girthon, Kirkcudbrightshire
- The Golden Bough, a comparative study of mythology and religion, by the Scottish anthropologist Sir James George Frazer (1854–1941)

"The Unfortunate Gwatkin"

- Daniel Gwatkin, a fictional person
  - Gwatkin is a surname
- Bridgedale, a manufacturer of thermal and other varieties of sock
- The churchyard of St Lawrence: St Lawrence's Church, Stoak, Cheshire
- Nelson Burt, nine year-old boy (son of Albin R. Burt) who drowned during the Mersey hurricane of 1822 and is buried in the churchyard of St Lawrence, Stoak; credited as producer of the 2011 album 90 Bisodol (Crimond) by Half Man Half Biscuit
- Slow Dempsey, a fictional person associated with Woodside Farm
- Woodside Farm, near Wervin, which is a small village and civil parish in the unitary authority of Cheshire West and Chester
- Wervin Turnpike, a road near Wervin
- Redbush tea, a herbal tea made from the plant Aspalathus linearis, a native of South Africa's fynbos
- Fig roll, a biscuit filled with fig paste that dates back to ancient Egypt
- Cresta, a frothy fruit-flavoured drink produced in the United Kingdom from the early 1970s through to around 2007; the wisdom of drinking it has subsequently been questioned
- Borehamwood, a town in southern Hertfordshire and an outlying suburb of London
- Hall, Stairs and Landing, a fictional band; an experimental trio from Borehamwood
- Scott Verplank (born 1964), American professional golfer
- Newcombe and Roche: John Newcombe (born 1944) and Tony Roche (born 1945), Australian tennis players who won multiple doubles titles together
- Congolesi Unsworth, a fictional band from Glasgow, whose songs were all written by the lead singer's grandfather
- Jodie Mudd (born 1960), American professional golfer
- Chongo, a character in the TV series Danger Island
- Danger Island, a 1968–69 live-action TV adventure serial

"Mileage Chart"

- Travel sweets, a glucose-based boiled sweet dusted with glucose powder, manufactured by UK company A. L. Simpkin & Co. Ltd, sold in close-fitting airtight tins often made hard to open by the action of moisture and heat on the glucose powder
- Matrix sign, an electronic traffic sign used on roadways to give travellers information about special events such as delays
- Arley Hall, a country house in the village of Arley, Cheshire, England
- Toll road, a public or private roadway for which a fee (or, toll) is charged for passage
- Stoke, several places in UK
- Ullapool, a small isolated town in Ross-shire, Scottish Highlands
- Deal, a town in Kent, England, 685 miles from Ullapool
- Armageddon, according to the Book of ~~Revelations~~ Revelation, the site of a gathering of armies for a battle during the end times
- Lower Nowhere, a fictional place
- ETA: Estimated time of arrival
