= 90 Bisodol (Crimond) =

Studio album by Half Man Half Biscuit
- Released: 26 September 2011
- Genre: Post-punk
- Length: 38:38
- Label: Probe Plus PROBE 65
- Producer: Nelson Burt

Half Man Half Biscuit chronology
CSI:Ambleside (2008)	90 Bisodol (Crimond) (2011)	Urge For Offal (2014)

Professional ratings
Review scores
Source	Rating
Allmusic	3/5 stars
MusicOMH	4/5 stars

90 Bisodol (Crimond) is the twelfth studio album by UK rock band Half Man Half Biscuit. It was released on 26 September 2011 by Probe Plus.

The inner sleeve includes a modified version of the painting Christ's Entry into Jerusalem by William Gale (1823–1909), in which one onlooker holds a sign with the words "Dirk Hofman Motorhomes". This is a reference to a man who holds such a sign at the finish of European cycling races.

== Critical reception ==
In a review for BBC, critic reviewer Luke Slater called the album the band's "most consistently brilliant work yet in every aspect, and another start-to-finish showcase of rare genius". The Quietus called it "probably their best, certainly their most consistent album".

== Track listing ==
90 Bisodol (Crimond) track listing
No.	Title	Length
1.	"Something's Rotten in the Back of Iceland"	2:33
2.	"RSVP"	2:58
3.	"Tommy Walsh's Eco House"	2:38
4.	"Joy in Leeuwarden (We Are Ready)"	2:30
5.	"Excavating Rita"	3:39
6.	"Fun Day in the Park"	2:00
7.	"Descent of the Stiperstones"	5:16
8.	"Left Lyrics in the Practice Room"	2:07
9.	"L'enfer c'est les autres"	3:10
10.	"Fix It So She Dreams of Me"	2:53
11.	"The Coroner's Footnote"	3:46
12.	"Rock and Roll Is Full of Bad Wools"	5:08

== Notes ==
- Bisodol is a brand of indigestion tablet
- Crimond is a village in Aberdeenshire, Scotland; whose name was adopted for a hymn tune by Jessie Seymour Irvine, most associated with a verse paraphrase of Psalm 23, "The Lord's my shepherd, I'll not want"
- The alleged producer, Nelson Burt, was a nine-year-old boy (son of Albin R. Burt) who drowned in the Mersey Hurricane of 1822, and whose grave is in the churchyard of St Lawrence's Church, Stoak; as mentioned in the song "The Unfortunate Gwatkin" on the 2014 album Urge for Offal by Half Man Half Biscuit
- The song title "Something's Rotten in the Back of Iceland" parodies the line "Something is rotten in the state of Denmark", spoken by Marcellus in Shakespeare's play Hamlet, Act 1 Scene 4
- The song title "Excavating Rita" parodies that of the 1980 play Educating Rita by Willy Russell.
- The song title "L'enfer c'est les autres" is a quotation from the 1944 existentialist French play Huis Clos by Jean-Paul Sartre (1905–1980); in English, "Hell is other people"
- "Wools" is a shortening of Woollybacks, an expression in Merseyside English which refers to people from neighbouring areas
