= Tiburcio =

Tiburcio, the Spanish form of Tiburtius, may refer to:

- Tiburcio Carías Andino (1876–1969), Honduran military strongman
- Tiburcio de León, Filipino general (the Philippine Revolution and Philippine-American War)
- José Tiburcio Serrizuela (born 1962), Argentine football (soccer) defender
- Tibúrcio Spannocchi (1541–1609), Spanish military engineer
- Tiburcio Vásquez (1835–1875), bandit in California

== See also ==
- 4349 Tibúrcio, asteroid
- Estadio Tiburcio Carías Andino, stadium in Honduras
