= Ctiboř =

Ctiboř may refer to places in the Czech Republic:

- Ctiboř (Benešov District), a municipality and village in the Central Bohemian Region
- Ctiboř (Tachov District), a municipality and village in the Plzeň Region
- Ctiboř, a village and part of Častrov in the Vysočina Region

== See also ==
- Ctibor, Slavic given name
