= Tibor Varga =

Tibor Varga may refer to:

- Tibor Varga (ice hockey) (born 1985), Slovak ice hockey player
- Tibor Varga (violinist) (1921–2003), Hungarian violinist and conductor
