= Tiburcio de León =

Filipino Freedom Fighter

- Born: Aquilino Tiburcio de León y Gregorio Tolomeo
- Military career
- Allegiance: Katipunan/Philippines
- Service years: 1896–1898
- Rank: General
- Conflicts: Philippine Revolution

General Aquilino Tiburcio de León y Gregorio Tolomeo was a Filipino freedom fighter who was a general during the 1896 Philippine Revolution and the Philippine–American War. He first served under Andrés Bonifacio in the Katipunan, and then, reluctantly, under the revolutionary government formed by Emilio Aguinaldo.

== Biography ==
Tiburcio was born in 1862 to Pedro de León and Florencia Gregorio in Polo (now Valenzuela), Bulacan.

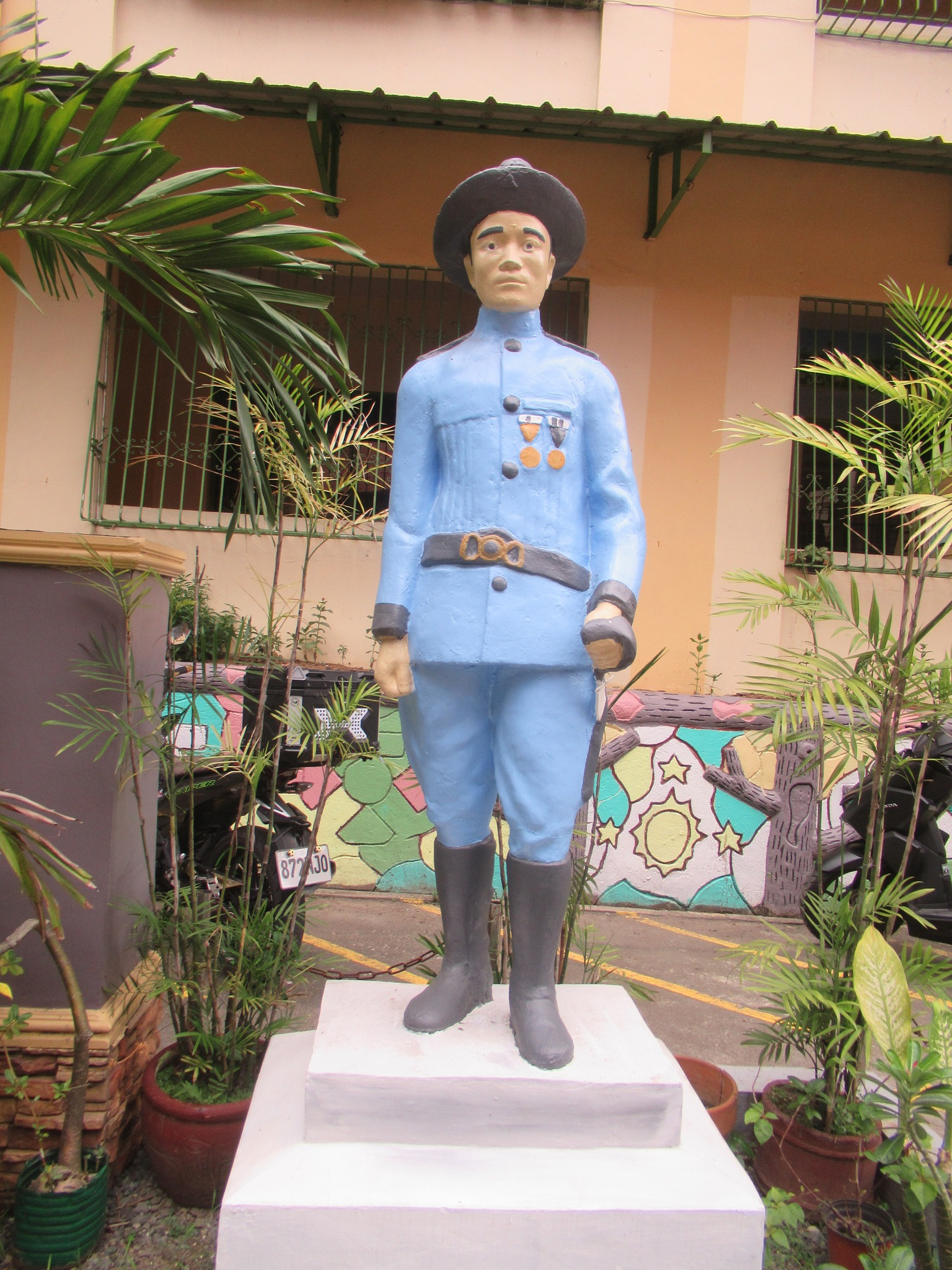
Gen. T. de Leon, Valenzuela City

"Heneral Tibo", as he was often referred to, is credited for having established units of the Katipunan in the towns of Polo, Obando, Marilao, Meycauayan, Bocaue, Santa Maria, and San Jose del Monte in Bulacan, and of Caloocan, Malabon, Navotas in Bataan.

In August 1896, when Spanish authorities discovered the existence of the Katipunan and moved against it, Bonifacio was away, conferring with de León at Pasong Balite on the outskirts of Bulacan. On learning that the Spanish had uncovered their organization, Bonifacio ordered all Katipuneros to gather at Balintawak, where they announced their rebellion by tearing up their cedulas (residency documents) in what would later be known as the "Cry of Balintawak".

Later, de León's forces were the only unit of the Magdiwang faction of the Katipunan to survive the death of Bonifacio. When Aguinaldo later asked him to commit his forces to the First Philippine Republic, de León was reluctant to do so, being loyal to Bonifacio. He eventually agreed, saying he was doing so only for the sake of the country. He is also known for his role in the Battle of Tullahan River during the Philippine–American War - a battle which enabled the forces of the Aguinaldo government to flee to Northern Luzon.

== Memorials ==
On February 18, 1968, the Sangguniang Nayon (Village Council) of Torres Bugallon signed into law the renaming of their community after Hen. Tiburcio de Leon "bilang karangalan nito sa pagiging bayani ng himagsikan sa panahon ng pamahalaang Kastila" (in recognition of his role as a hero of the revolution during the time of the Spanish Government). After the change in terminologies during the reign of President Marcos, this community is now known as Barangay Hen. Tiburcio de Leon, Valenzuela, Bulacan. The Hen. Tiburcio de Leon Elementary School is also named after him. A stone monument was raised by his comrades (Veteranos de la Revolución) in memory of Heneral Tibo in the town of Timog, Bulacan.

== Gallery ==
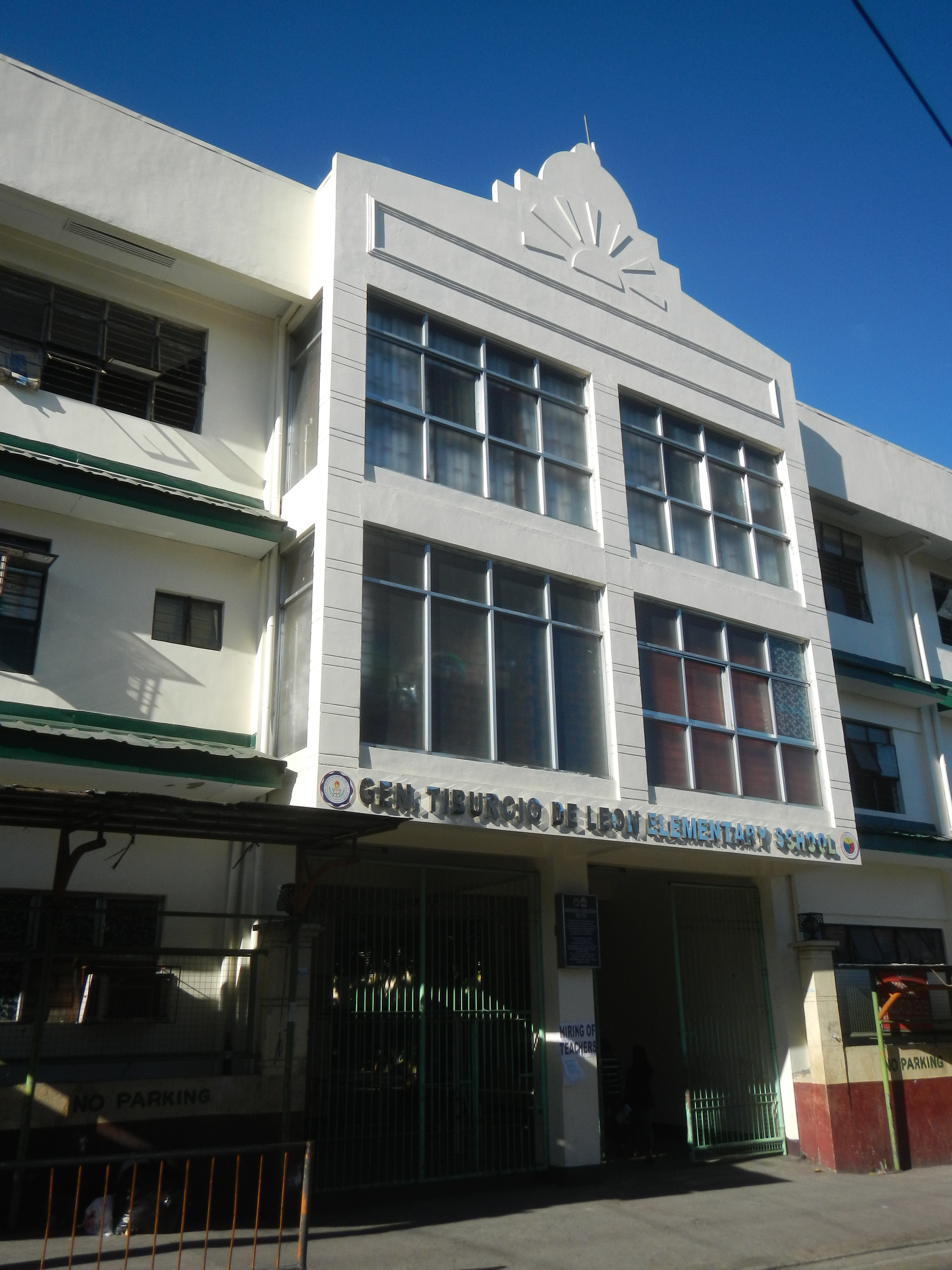
Gen. Tiburcio de Leon Elementary School, Valenzuela City

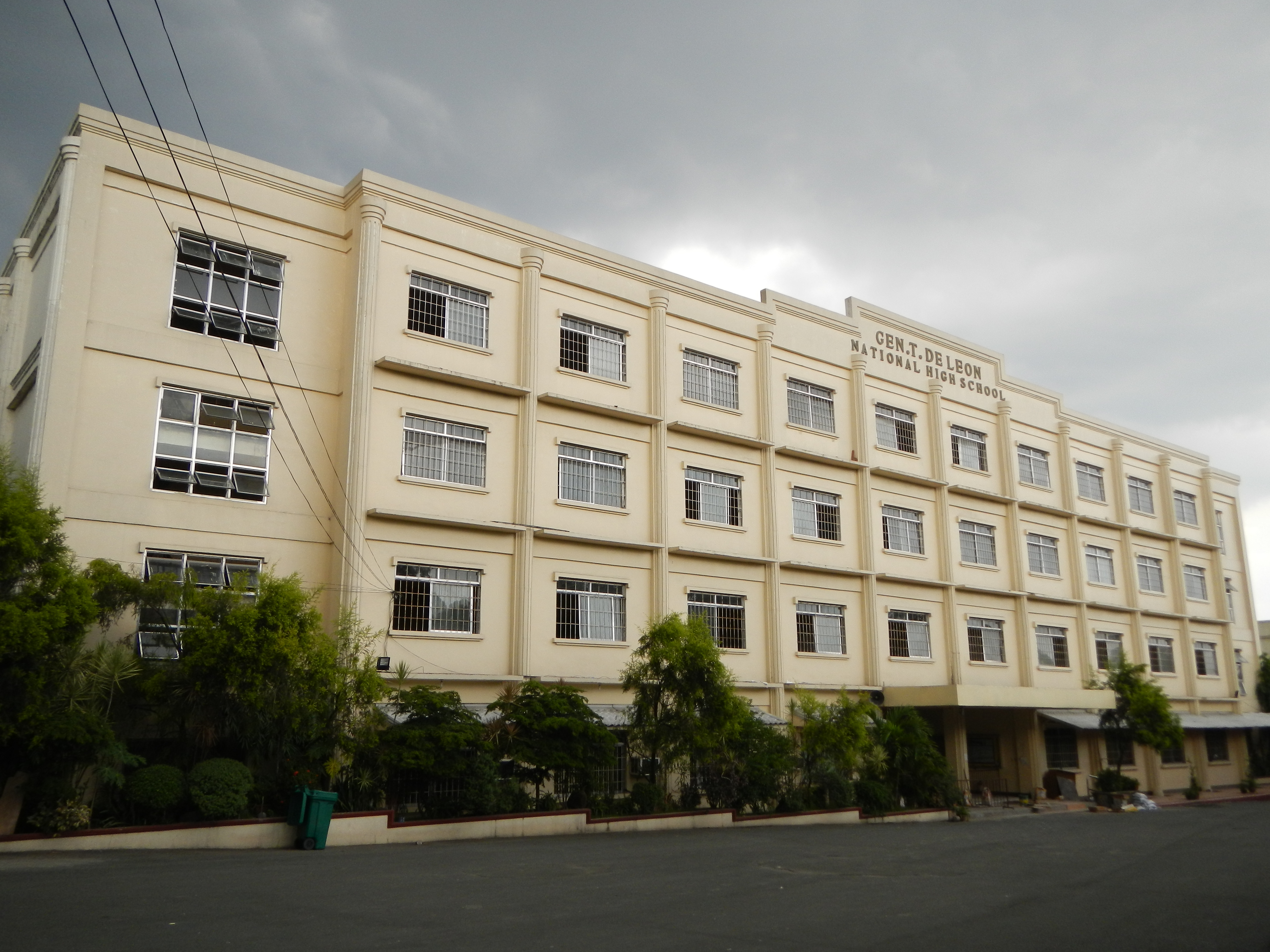
Gen. T. de Leon National High School
