= Cresta (soft drink) =

British drink brand

Cresta was a frothy fruit-flavoured drink produced in the United Kingdom by Schweppes from the early 1970s through to the early 1990s. It originally came in four different flavours: strawberry, lemon & lime, pineapple and orange; blackcurrant & Cream Soda were added later.

== Advertising campaign ==
Cresta is widely remembered for its 1970s advertising campaign led by a cartoon polar bear (also called Cresta) sporting sunglasses whose attempts at looking suavely cool would be overwhelmed by bouts of uncontrolled enthusiasm when drinking Cresta. The bear's widely quoted catch phrase "It's frothy, man!" summed up the difference between Cresta and more traditionally fizzy soft drinks. This campaign was created by John Webster of Boase Massimi Pollitt, who also invented the Smash instant potato advertisements featuring robotic aliens and the Honey Monster in Sugar Puffs campaigns. Most of the commercials were animated at the Richard Williams Studios for funding on The Thief and the Cobbler.

== In popular culture ==
- Cresta is mentioned, several times, in the song "The Unfortunate Gwatkin" by the band Half Man Half Biscuit on their 2014 album Urge For Offal.
- During the John Inman version of Teddy Bear's Picnic several bears are mentioned including a big bear waving something around and saying "It's frothy man" according to the singer, a thinly veiled reference to the Cresta bear mascot.
- An over 40 year old bottle of Cresta (notably possessing an odour and taste of "medicine and sewage") was reviewed by YouTuber Ashens.
