= Ctibor =

Ctibor is a masculine Czech and Slovak given name, a cognate to Tiburtius. The first part cti- is derived from the Slavic word čest (i.e. 'honour'), the second part -bor is derived from the old Slavic verb boriti ('to fight'). The name therefore means "honorably fighting" or "fighting for honour". Notable people with the name include:

- Czcibor (Czech: Ctibor; died after 972), Polan prince
- Ctibor Malý (1885–1968), Czech footballer
- Ctibor Reiskup (1929–1963), Slovak rower
- Ctibor Turba (1944–2025), Czech actor

== See also ==
- Ścibor, the Polish form of the name Ctibor
- Tibor, similar European name
- Borek (name), derived from Ctibor
