= William Gale (painter) =

English painter

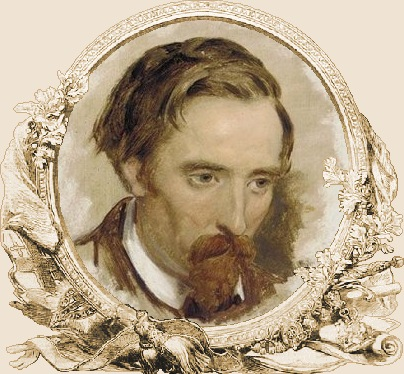
- William Gale, Self portrait
- Born: 1823; London, England
- Died: 1909 (aged 85–86)
- Education: Art Academy of Mr Sass, Bloomsbury, London; Royal Academy, London
- Known for: Painter
- Movement: Orientalist
- Website: William Gale: Victorian Artist

William Gale (1823–1909) was an English Victorian painter, often of Orientalist subjects.

== Life and career ==
Gale was born in London. He exhibited annually at the Royal Academy 1844–93, but was never elected a member. He exhibited regularly at the British Institution and at the Royal Society of British Artists.

In 1851, he married and travelled to Italy for his honeymoon. Like many of his contemporary artists, he travelled to the Middle East, in 1862 and again in 1867. He was a prolific artist; his output included sentimental, biblical and mythological subjects, and portraits and Orientalist pictures. There are examples of his work in the Tate Gallery, in the Glasgow Museums, and in the Art Gallery of New South Wales.

His painting Christ's Entry into Jerusalem features in the sleeve notes of the 2011 album 90 Bisodol (Crimond) by the band Half Man Half Biscuit.

== Selected works ==
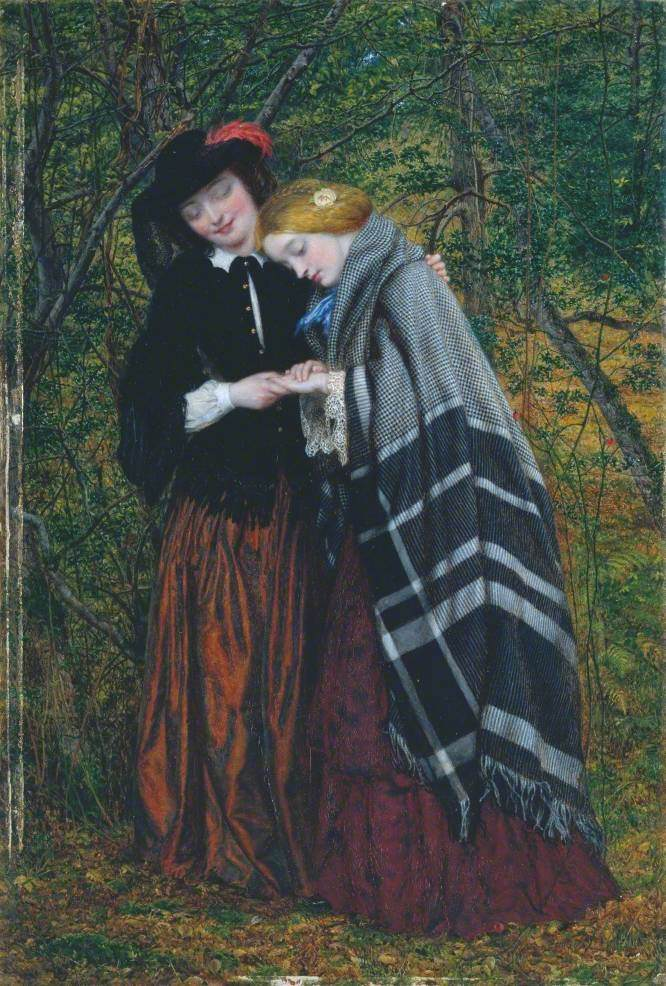
The Confidante, 1857, Tate

- Young Celadon and his Amelia, 1845
- Chaucer's Dream, 1850
- Cydippe, 1851
- The Captured Runaway, 1856 (John Scott Collection)
- Nazareth, (wood engraving), 1856
- Eastern Woman, 1856
- Eyes to the Blind, 1861
- After the Spanish, c. 1861
- Blind Bartemeus, 1865
- Nearing Home, 1866
- The Holy Family, 1866
- Interior, Algiers, 1867
- The Favourite, date unknown

== See also ==
- List of Orientalist artists
- List of artistic works with Orientalist influences
