= Tibor =

Tibor is a masculine given name found throughout Europe.

There are several explanations for the origin of the name:

- from Latin name Tiberius, which means "from Tiber", Tiber being a river in Rome.
- in old Slavic languages, Tibor means "sacred place".
- shortened form of the name Tiborc; which originates from the ancient Latin surname Tiburtius.
- from Etruscan name Tibur, which means "honest man"

Some notable people known by this name include:

- Tibor Ág
- Tibor Antalpéter
- Tibor Benedek
- Tibor Farkas
- Tibor Feheregyhazi
- Tibor Fischer
- Tibor Gécsek
- Tibor Hollo
- Tibor Kalman
- Tibor R. Machan
- Tibor Mičinec
- Tibor Nyilasi
- Tibor Ordina
- Tibor Őze Hungarian football manager
- Tibor Parák
- Tibor Pleiß
- Tibor Polgár (1907–1993), Hungarian composer
- Tibor Radó
- Tibor Renyi
- Tibor Selymes
- Tibor Sisa Hungarian football manager
- Tibor Stark
- Tibor Szasz
- Tibor Szele
- Tibor Varga (ice hockey)
- Tibor Varga (violinist)
- Tibor Viniczai
- Tibor Wlassics
- Tibor Zsitvay

== See also ==
- Ctibor (name)
- Tibor is the Hungarian name for Tibru village, Cricău Commune, Alba County, Romania
- TIBOR is the short name for the Tokyo Interbank Offered Rate
- Tibor, a Pikwik Pack character
