= Tiburtius =

Tiburtius is a given name and surname. Notable people with the name include:

== Given name ==
- Saint Tiburtius, 3rd century Christian martyr
- Tiburtius, Valerian, and Maximus, Christian martyrs
- Tiburtius Rosd (died after 1222), Hungarian nobleman

== Surname ==
- Franziska Tiburtius (1843–1927), German physician

== See also ==
- Tibor, European name related to Tiburtius
- Ctibor, Czech name related to Tiburtius
