= St Lawrence's Church, Stoak =

Coordinates: 53.2534°N 2.8654°W

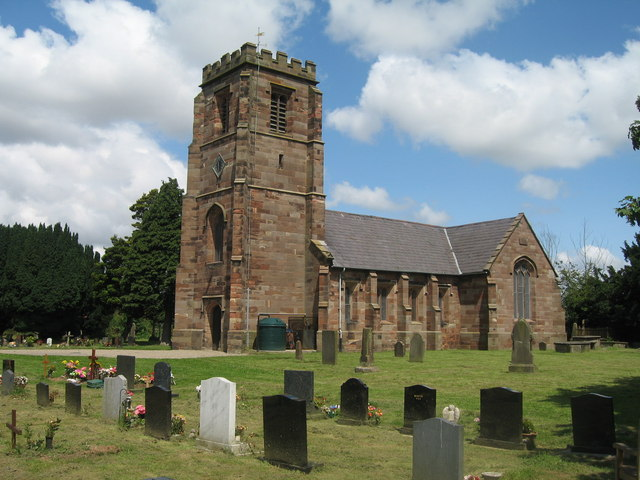
- St Lawrence's Church, Stoak, from the southwest

- Location in Cheshire
- OS grid reference: SJ 423 734
- Location: Stoak, Cheshire
- Country: England
- Denomination: Anglican
- Churchmanship: Open evangelical

History
- Status: Team ministry
- Dedication: Saint Lawrence

Architecture
- Functional status: Active
- Heritage designation: Grade II*
- Designated: 1 June 1967
- Architect: George Edgecombe
- Architectural type: Church
- Style: Gothic Revival

Specifications
- Materials: Red sandstone, slate roofs

Administration
- Province: York
- Diocese: Chester
- Archdeaconry: Chester
- Deanery: Wirral South
- Parish: Ellesmere Port Team

St Lawrence's Church is in the village of Stoak, Cheshire, England, (which lies between the intersection of the M56 and M53 motorways and the Shropshire Union Canal). The church is recorded in the National Heritage List for England as a designated Grade II* listed building. It is an active Anglican parish church in the diocese of Chester, the archdeaconry of Chester, the deanery of Wirral South and the Ellesmere Port team ministry.

== History ==
A Saxon chapel was originally on the site. It was not mentioned in the Domesday Book but fragments of architecture still present in the 19th century showed that a new church must have been built soon after the Norman conquest. Ormerod quotes sources from the 14th century which stated that at that time the church was "a sumptuous fabric of stone and wood, of great size, with four bells, but was then becoming ruinous". The present church dates from its rebuilding in 1827, undertaken by George Edgecombe (or Edgecumbe), and very little of the original work remains. A further restoration was carried out in 1911–12.

== Architecture ==
=== Exterior ===
The church has a cruciform plan with a west tower, nave, north and south transepts and a chancel. The tower dates from 1827, and is in the style of the 15th century. In the 1827 restoration the north wall was left largely intact. The tower has corner buttresses and is embattled. On its west face is a recessed door above which is a two-light window and over that is a clock in a lozenge tablet. The clock has one hand.

=== Interior ===
The Tudor hammerbeam roof of the nave was also little changed in the 1827 restoration. In the church are an oak parish chest from 1686, some old pews, a Jacobean altar table, a Georgian pulpit and, in the chancel, three old chairs, two of them dating from the time of Charles II. The west gallery incorporates part of the original rood screen. The memorials include a wall monument to Henry Bunbury dated 1732 in marble. They also include 13 memorial boards which are probably by members of the Randle Holme family of Chester. These have dates between 1627 and 1702 and are also mainly to the memory of the Bunbury family. The church has the oldest bells in the Wirral which are dated 1615, 1631 and 1642. The parish registers, with one small break, are complete from 1543, and the churchwardens' accounts, with gaps, date from 1677.

== External features ==
In the churchyard is a red sandstone sundial, probably dating from the 17th century, which is listed at Grade II. It has an octagonal pillar on an octagonal base with the remains of a brass sundial cemented on its top. The churchyard contains the grave of nine-year-old Nelson Burt, son of Albin R. Burt, drowned during the Mersey hurricane of 1822. The churchyard also contains the war graves of an Army Veterinary Corps soldier of World War I and two airmen of World War II.

== Cultural references ==
The church, and the grave of Nelson Burt, are mentioned in the song The Unfortunate Gwatkin by the band Half Man Half Biscuit on their 2014 album Urge for Offal.

== See also ==
- Grade II* listed buildings in Cheshire West and Chester
- Listed buildings in Stoak
