= Albin R. Burt =

English painter

Albin Roberts Burt (1 December 1783 – 16 March 1842) was an English engraver and portrait-painter.

== Life ==
Burt began his career as an engraver, having been a pupil of Robert Thew and Benjamin Smith but, finding himself unable to excel in this field, took to painting portraits. He exhibited at the Royal Academy in 1830 and died at Reading on 18 March 1842. One of his prints represented Lady Hamilton, whom his mother knew when a barefooted girl in Wales, as Britannia unveiling the bust of Nelson.

His nine-year-old son Nelson Burt drowned during the Mersey hurricane of 1822, and is buried at St Lawrence's Church, Stoak.

== Sources ==
This article incorporates text from a publication now in the public domain: Fagan, Louis Alexander (1886). "Burt, Albin R.". In Stephen, Leslie (ed.). Dictionary of National Biography. Vol. 07. London: Smith, Elder & Co.
