= Gen. T. de Leon National High School =

General Tiburcio de Leon National High School
- Mataas na Paaralang Pambansa ng Heneral Tiburcio de Leon
- Official logo

Location
- Mercado St. cor. Gen. T. de Leon Rd., Brgy. Gen. T. de Leon; Valenzuela City, Metro Manila 1442; Philippines
- 14°41′15″N 120°59′58″E

Information
- Type: Public
- Founded: 1969
- School district: Division of City Schools - Valenzuela
- Principal: Lagrimas B. Bayle, Salvacion V. David (former)
- Grades: 7 to 12
- Average class size: approx. 50
- Student to teacher ratio: approx. 50:1
- Language: English, Filipino
- Campus type: Urban
- Nickname: Gen T, Tañada(former), GTDLNHS
- Newspaper: The Genzette (English); Ang Daluyan (Tagalog)
- Yearbook: Genzette

General Tiburcio de Leon National High School, also known as Gen. T. de Leon National High School or GTDNHS is a public national high school in Valenzuela, Philippines. It is under the supervision of the Division and City Schools - Valenzuela. Founded in 1969, the school had first served as an annex to Valenzuela Municipal High School. Since 1997, it had become a fully independent high school in Valenzuela. Its location has been moved several times, from Gen. T. de Leon Elementary School, to Tañada Subdivision to its present location in Mercado St. near T. Bugallion Bridge.

== History ==
The Gen. T. de Leon National High School main building pediment bearing the name of the school

The Gen. T. de Leon National High School Campus, 4-storey main building

Schools main building (right) and extension building(left), as seen at North Luzon Expressway

The Gen. T. de Leon National High School new school building

=== Annex ===
Gen. T. de Leon National High School was founded in 1969 under the school extension name Valenzuela Municipal High School—Gen. T. de Leon Annex. Former Valenzuela municipal mayor Gerardo Angeles initiated the creation of the school, more generally of barrio high schools in Valenzuela. Through his effort, the VMHS-Gen. T. de Leon Annex was put-up at Gen. T. de Leon Elementary School compound under Valenzuela Municipal High School, whose principal then was Josefina Avendaño-Lisazo.

There were three classrooms (Marcos Type Building) given to the high school, two were borrowed from the elementary and the barangay hall inside the elementary compound was used as a classroom. Ana D. Cruz was the first chairperson designated to look over the high school.
From 1976 to 1984, Mrs. Rosario Tolentino – Santos was appointed as Head Teacher.

=== Transfer of location ===
In 1984, during the term of Adalia Villasfer as the head teacher, the annex was transferred to a 1,533 sq. m. lot at Karen St., Tañada Subdivision, donated by the Filipino Chinese Chamber of Commerce. Seven classrooms were built through the cooperation and support of the Parents-Teachers Association headed by its president Rodrigo Dimagiba.

=== Major improvements ===
When Villasfer resigned, Bernardina Echaluce assumed office as officer-in-charge of the school. Julita Cayanan took over in 1991 and the student population started to increase. Efren H. Tanfelix became the Secondary School Head of GTDLNHS in 1992. Under his administration, a three storey-building with 12 classrooms was donated by the national government through the effort of former second district representative Antonio M. Serapio.

On November 1, 1997, the school became fully independent by virtue of the Republic Act 6655.

=== Present ===
2014 facade

In 2005, there had been a major reshuffling of principals in Valenzuela high schools, which appointed Salvacion V. David to be the new principal of the school. The present administration of David initiated significant changes in physical development, staff improvement, and pursuit of quality education. During her term, the school re-transferred to its newer and larger location in Mercado St. near T. Bugallon Bridge. The school building, which was constructed early 2006, was first used in 2007–2008 school year and was inaugurated on December 11, 2007. The acquisition of the new site is a joint effort of David, former barangay captain Alfredo Caiña, and the members of the Local School Board, which includes mayor Sherwin T. Gatchalian, former schools division superintendent Dr. Alma Bella O. Bautista, and second district councilors Lorena Natividad-Borja and Kate Galang.

=== Additional school building ===
In early 2008, another school building in the same location was constructed to further expand the school for the growing population of the school. In the 2009–2010 school year, the newly built school building was initially in used for all 4th year sections and some 3rd year sections and is now fully functional this school year.

== Location ==
Gen. T. de Leon National High School is in Barangay Gen. T. de Leon which is situated at the eastern part of Valenzuela City. The campus is located at the east end part of the Gen. T. de Leon Rd., and near the Torres Bugallion Bridge at Barangay Ugong, Valenzuela.

The campus buildings can be widely seen from the North Luzon Expressway after Balintawak Toll Barrier.

== Facilities ==
The Gen. T. de Leon National High School covered court

Gen. T. de Leon National High School's main campus building is built in a 6,000 sq.m. lot. The main building has four storeys with 39 rooms where 29 of them is used for lecture purposes while other rooms are administrative and scholastic usage. The main building contains the school library, computer laboratory, garden, audio-visual lecture rooms, and cafeteria.

The school also has a covered court beside the main building. The covered court is used for schools programs, sporting events and other extra-curricular events and activities. In 2008, the school was one of the host school in the 2008 Palarong Panrehiyon and the covered court was the main facility used in hosting Taekwondo and Arnis.

The school has improved since it was transferred from Tañada Subdivision to Mercado St. The classrooms are larger than the ones in the Tañada Building. There have been more than enough armchairs and tables. In terms of facilities for hygiene, the school had more toilets; every floor except the ground floor had its own toilets end to end of the building.

=== Expansion ===
In September 2024, San Miguel Corporation donated seven 4,305 square meters lots to the Valenzuela LGU for GTDNHS expansion and its 6,169 students. The development includes the constructions of four-story 16-classroom buildings for 2,880 students and an amphitheater, as a multipurpose event center.

== Faculty ==
Gen. T. de Leon National High School comprises seven faculty departments, the Science Department, the English Department, the Mathematics Department, the Filipino Department, the Araling Panlipunan Department, the TLE(Technology and Livelihood Education) Department and the MAPEH(Music, Arts, Physical Education & Health) Department.
