= Častrov =

- Municipality
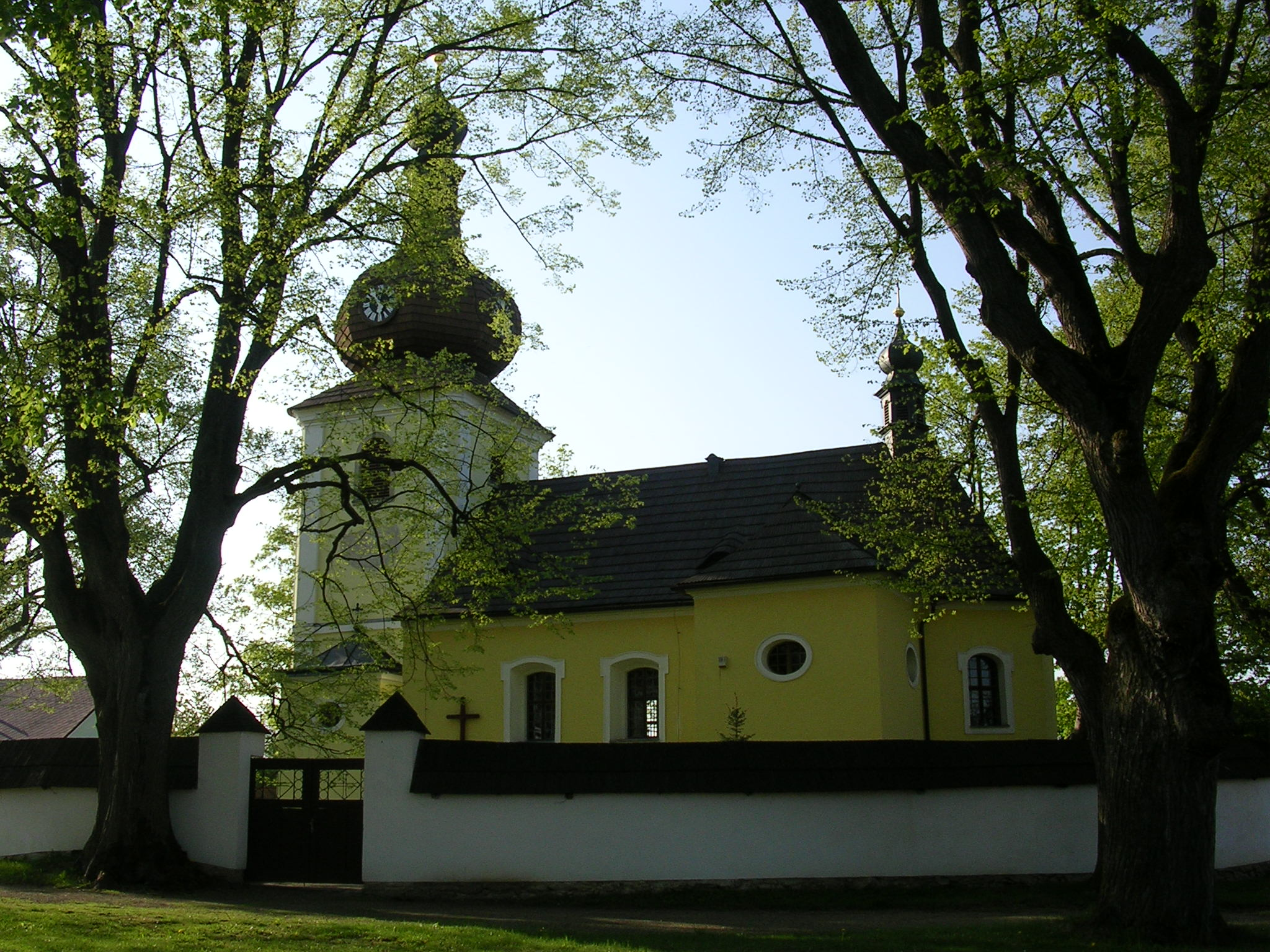
- Church of Saint Nicholas

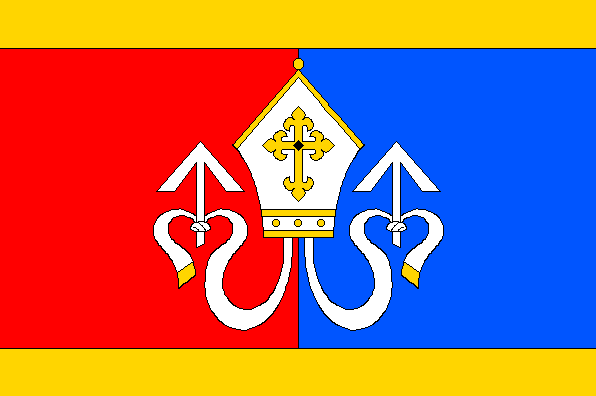
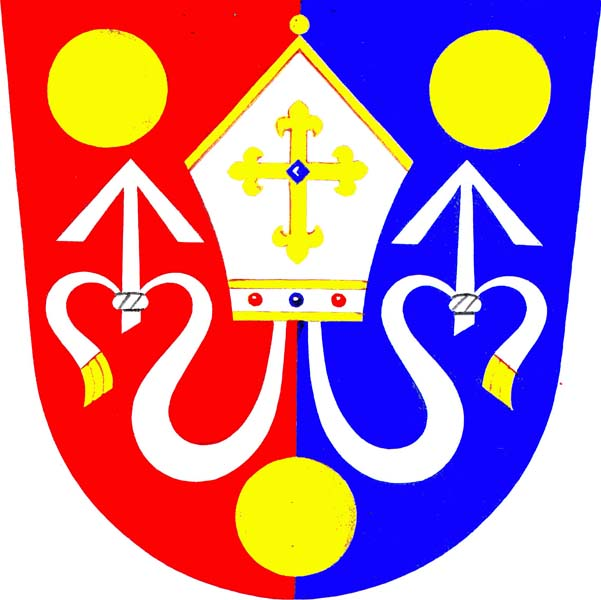
- Flag Coat of arms

- Location in the Czech Republic
- Coordinates: 49°18′28″N 15°10′49″E
- Country: Czech Republic
- Region: Vysočina
- District: Pelhřimov
- First mentioned: 1300

Area
  - Total: 35.78 km^{2} (13.81 sq mi)
- Elevation: 604 m (1,982 ft)

Population (2026-01-01)
  - Total: 630
  - Density: 18/km^{2} (46/sq mi)
- Time zone: UTC+1 (CET)
  - Summer (DST): UTC+2 (CEST)
- Postal codes: 394 63, 394 68, 394 70
- Website: www.castrov.cz

Častrov is a municipality and village in Pelhřimov District in the Vysočina Region of the Czech Republic. It has about 600 inhabitants.

Častrov lies approximately 13 kilometres (8 mi) south of Pelhřimov, 31 km (19 mi) west of Jihlava, and 102 km (63 mi) southeast of Prague.

== Administrative division ==
Častrov consists of six municipal parts (in brackets population according to the 2021 census):

- Častrov (354)
- Ctiboř (46)
- Jakubín (30)
- Metánov (144)
- Pelec (46)
- Perky (13)

== Demographics ==
Historical population
Year	Pop.	±%
1869	1,777	—
1880	1,813	+2.0%
1890	1,890	+4.2%
1900	1,762	−6.8%
1910	1,873	+6.3%
1921	1,796	−4.1%
1930	1,514	−15.7%
1950	1,103	−27.1%
1961	999	−9.4%
1970	911	−8.8%
1980	771	−15.4%
1991	635	−17.6%
2001	513	−19.2%
2011	562	+9.6%
2021	633	+12.6%
Source: Censuses
