= Louis Alexander Fagan =

British writer (1845–1903)

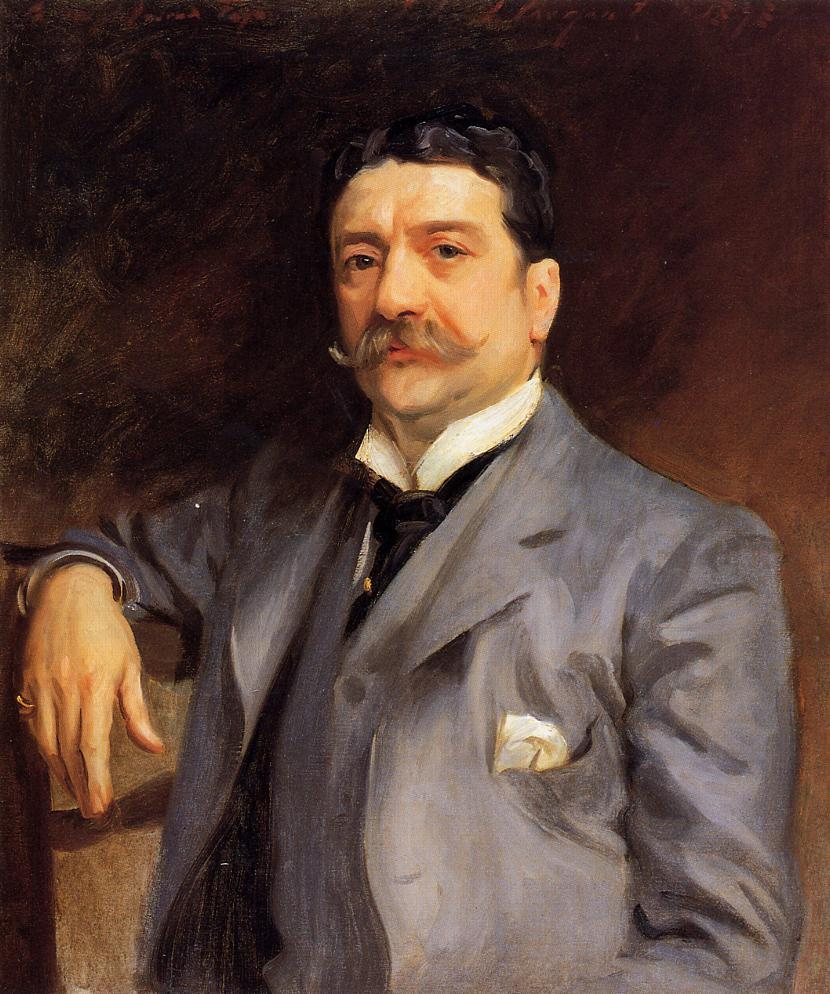
- Louis Alexander Fagan by John Singer Sargent
- Born: 7 February 1845; Naples, Kingdom of the Two Sicilies
- Died: 5 January 1903 (aged 57); Florence
- Employer: British Museum

Louis Alexander Fagan (7 February 1845 – 5 January 1903) was an Anglo-Italian writer and artist. He worked in the Department of Prints and Drawings for the British Museum from 1869 to 1894, and wrote various books on the department. A painting of him by John Singer Sargent sold at auction for $118,750 in 2020.

== Early life ==
Louis Alexander Fagan was born in 1845 in Naples, Kingdom of the Two Sicilies to George Fagan and his wife Maria, their second son out of three sons and four daughters. His grandfather was Robert Fagan, a painter, diplomat and archaeologist. His younger brother, Charles Edward Fagan, later became the secretary of the Natural History Department at the British Museum. In 1860, he was sent to England by a Queen's Messenger and was taken care of by Sir Anthony Panizzi, a friend of his father's who he would later write a biography on.

== Career ==
In 1869, Fagan began working at the Department of Prints and Drawings at the British Museum and in 1875, he was recorded to have a salary of £215 (£32,000 in today's money) for his role "act[ing] as Assistant Keeper in the Print Room". (Note: This is referring to the Prints and Drawings Department at the British Museum) In 1881, Thom's Irish Almanac and Official Directory of the United Kingdom of Great Britain and Ireland listed him as "Assistant, Second Class...(acting Assistant Keeper)". In 1882, the Post Office London Directory, 1882 recorded him as the same.

In 1893, John Singer Sargent painted a 30.25x25.125 inch oil on canvas portrait of Fagan, which was sold in 2020 at Doyle's for $118, 750.

In his lifetime he wrote 92 articles for the original 1985-1900 Dictionary of National Biography.

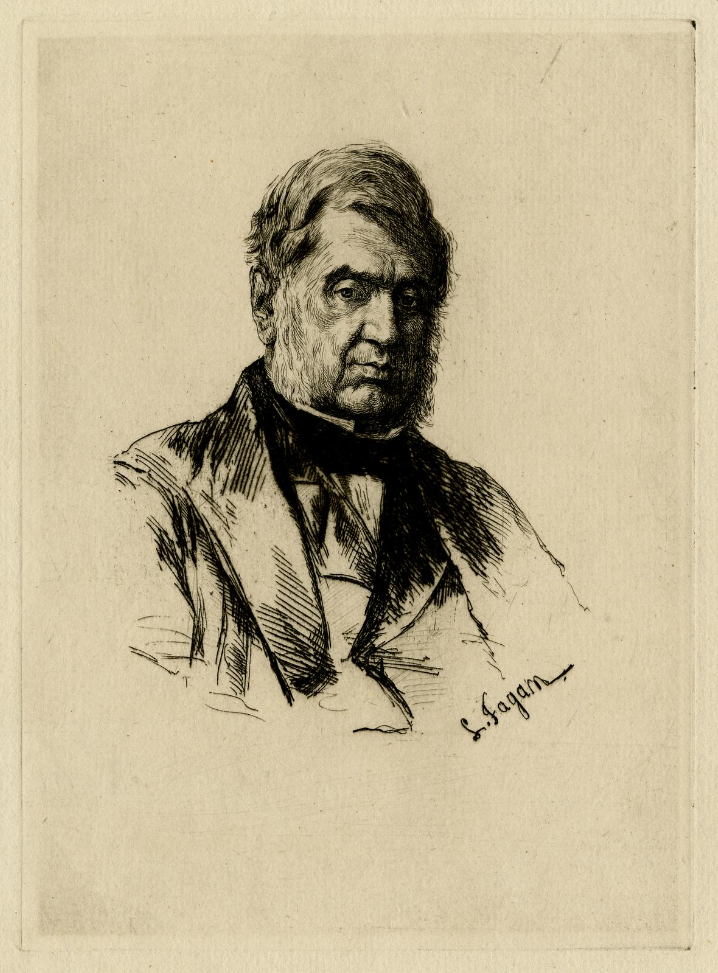
A Portrait of Antonio Panizzi by Fagan, owned by the British Museum

== Death ==
He retired in 1894 from ill health, and on 5 January 1903, he died in Florence. His painting was donated by his wife to the Reform Club in 1911.

== Family ==
On 8 November 1887, he married Caroline Frances Purves.

== Literary works ==
=== English ===
- Handbook to the Department of Prints and Drawings in the British Museum (1876)
- The Life of Sir Anthony Panizzi, K.C.B (1881) in 2 vols.
- The Art of Michel' Angelo Buonarroti as Illustrated by the Various Collections in the British Museum (1883)
- Collectors' Marks (1183)
- A Catalogue Raisonné of the Engraved Works of William Woollett (1885)
- 1836–1886. The Reform Club: Its Founders and Architect (1887)
- A Descriptive Catalogue of the Engraved Works of William Faithorne (1888)
- An easy walk through the British museum, or, How to see it in a few hours (1891)

=== Italian ===
- Vita di Michelangelo Buonarroti. Catalogo dei disegni, sculture [&c.] di Michelangelo Buonarroti esistenti in Inghilterra, compilato da L. Fagan (Note: Translation: [The] Life of Michelangelo Buonarroti. [With] Catalogue of drawings, sculptures etc. by Michelangelo Buonarroti existent in England, compiled by L. Fagan) (1875)
- Lettere ad Antonio Panizzi di uomini illustri e di amici italiani, 1823-1870 (Note: Translation: Letters to Antonio Panizzi from distinguished men and Italian friends, 1823-1870) (1880)

=== Contributions to other literary works ===
He edited Letters of Prosper Merimée to Panizzi (1881) in 2 vols. as well as their French and Italian counterparts. He also translated The Masters of Raffaello (Raphael Sanzio) (1882) by Marco Minghetti into English.

== Gallery ==
Artwork

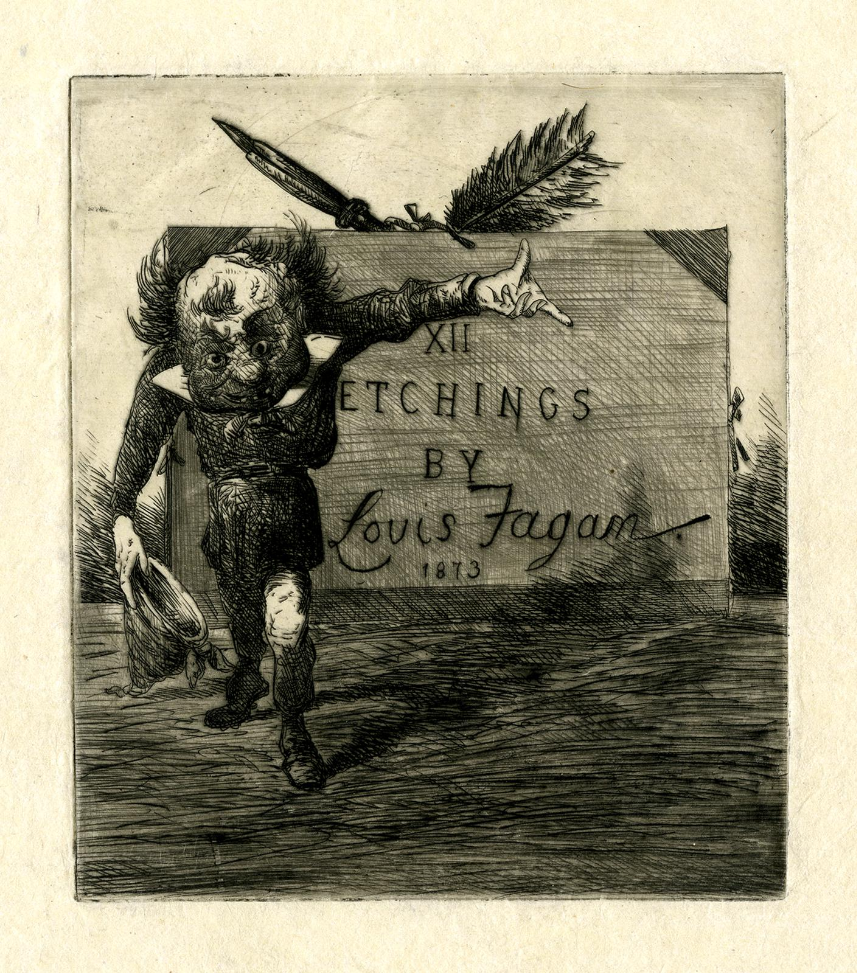
Frontispiece, Souvenirs of Southern Italy

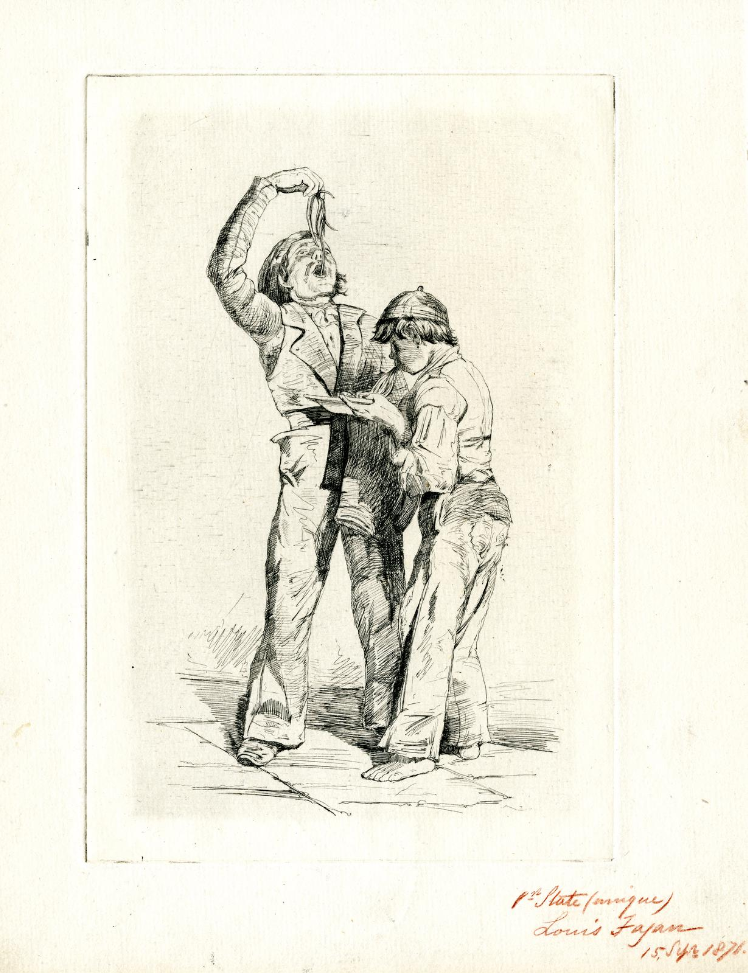
Maccaroni Eaters

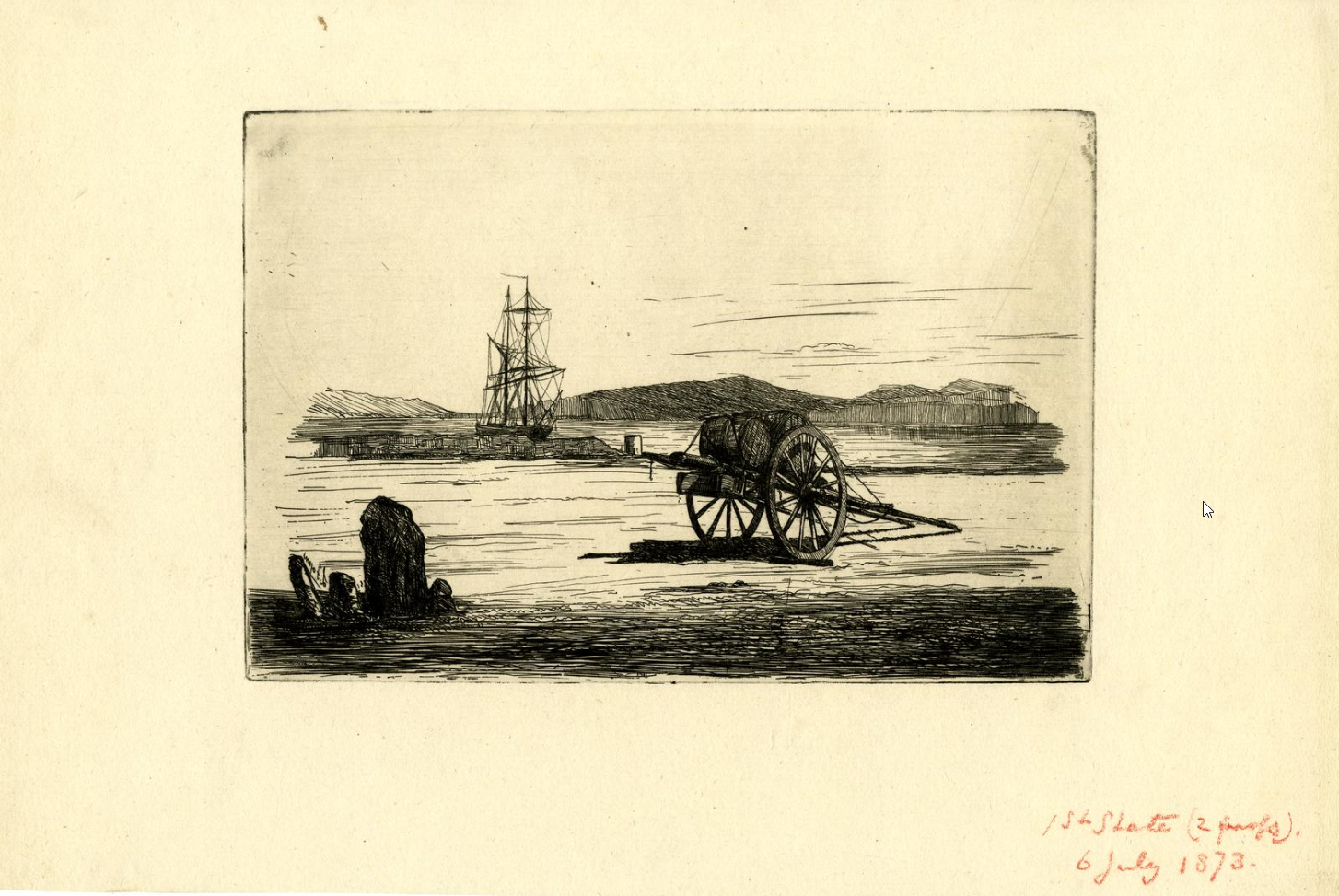
View at Baia

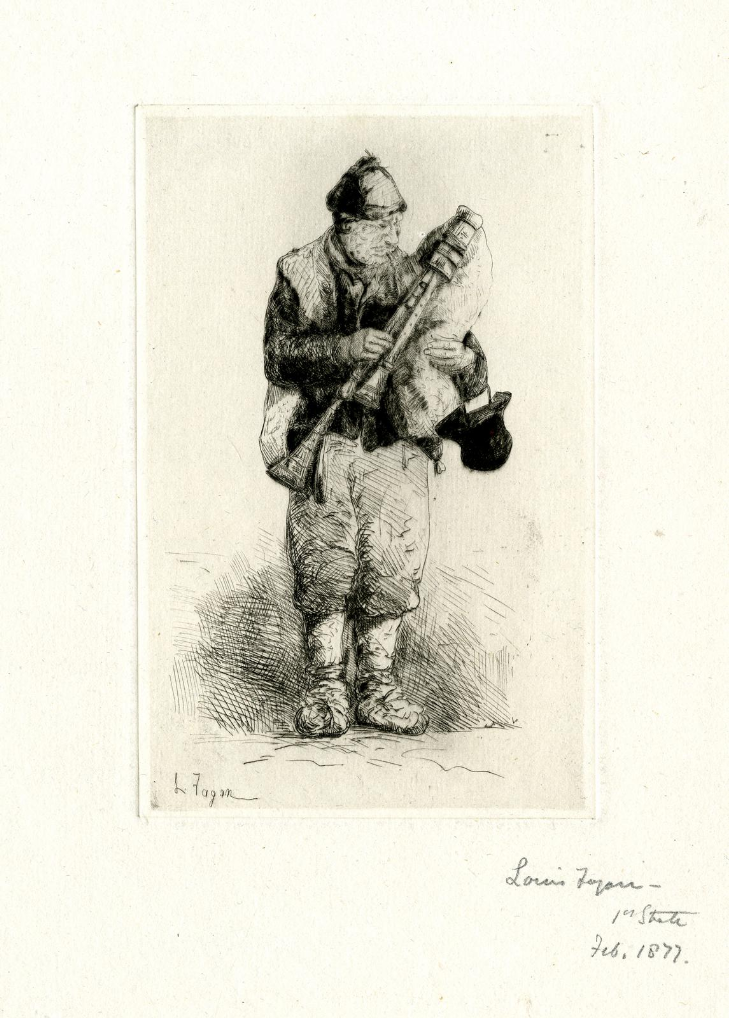
Old Italian Man, Souvenirs of Southern Italy

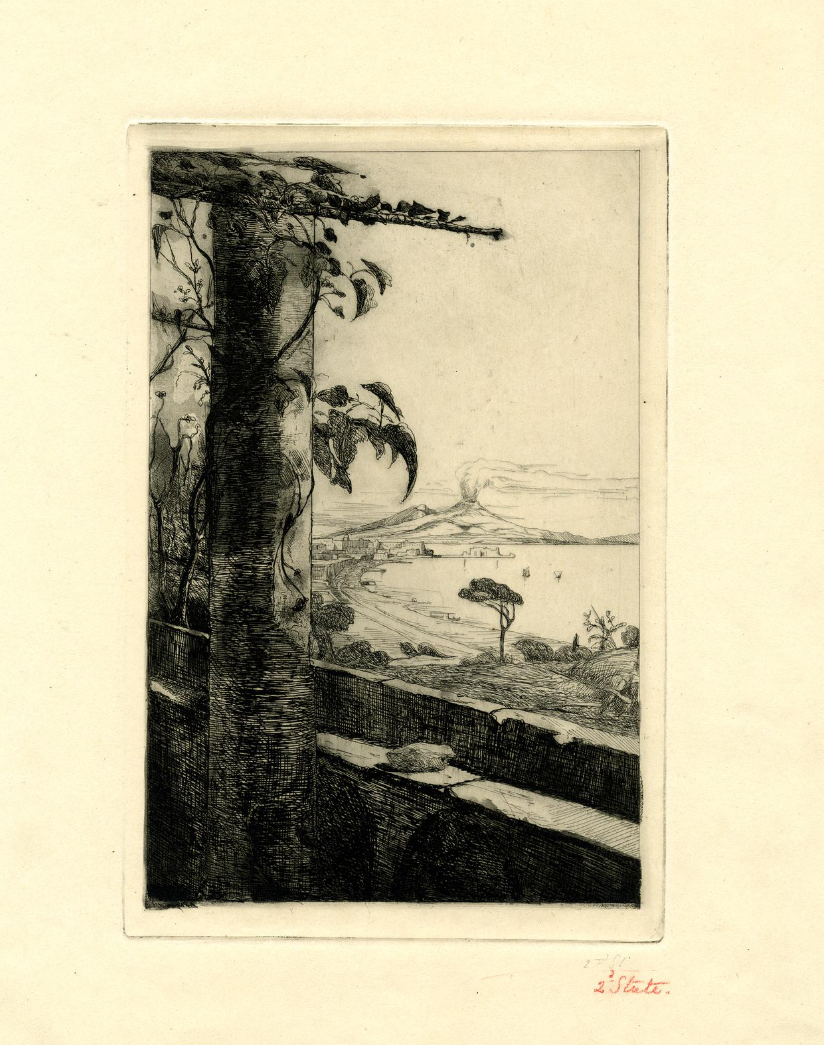
Landscape, viewed from a terrace on a hillside
