= A. L. Simpkin & Co. Ltd =

English confectionery company

Coordinates: 53.403334°N 1.503547°W

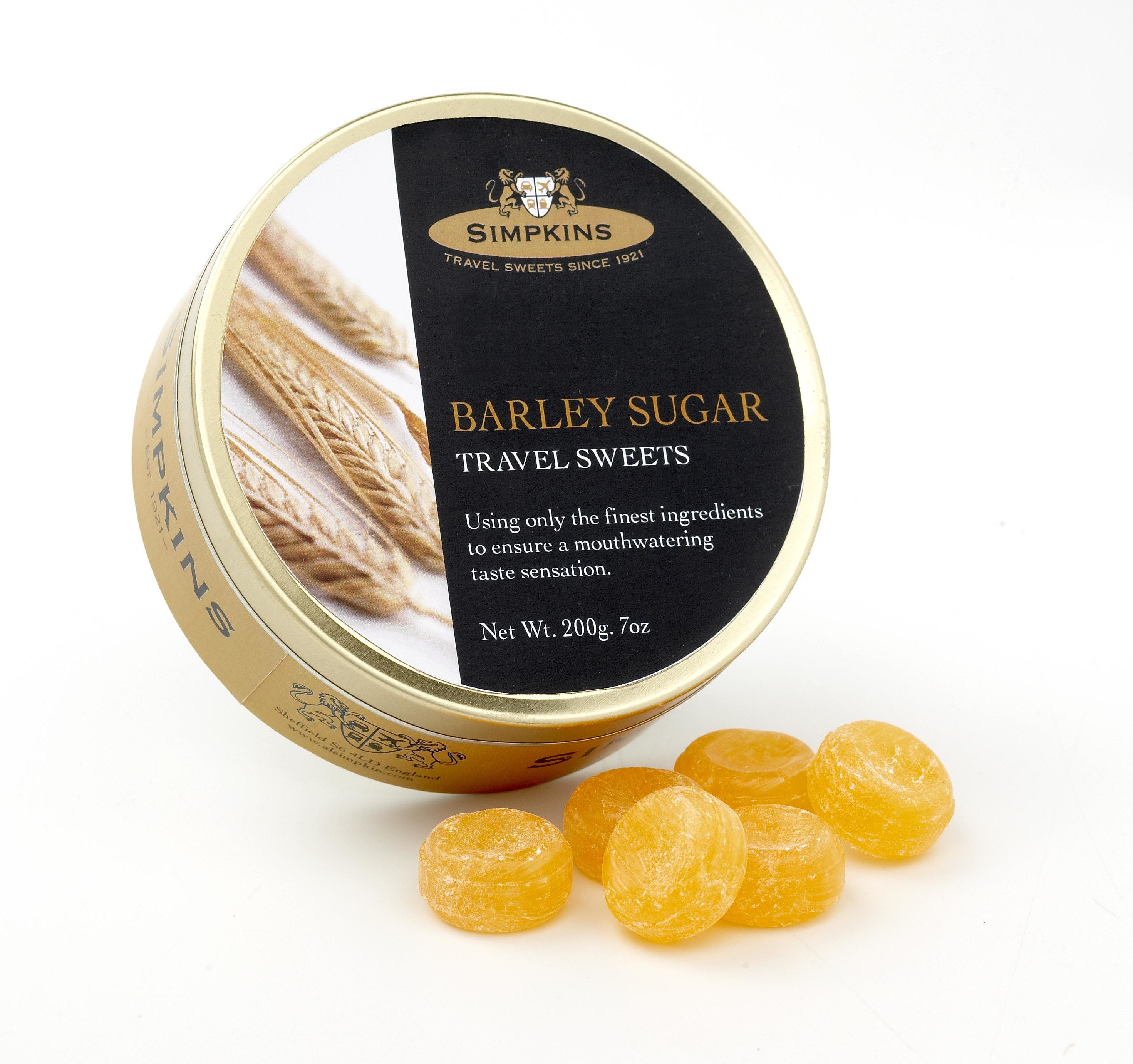
Simpkins' barley sugar travel sweets

A. L. Simpkin & Co. Ltd are a company of confectionery makers based in Sheffield, England. The firm's premises are located on Hunter Road in the Hillsborough area of the city.

== History ==
The firm was set up by Albert Leslie Simpkin in 1921. He had been involved in World War I, during which he was mentioned in despatches and awarded the Military Cross. After being demobilised from the army in 1920 as a result of the effect of severe wounds, he became a retailer and wholesaler of sweets before purchasing his own confectionery manufacturing company on Sedan Street in the Pitsmoor area of Sheffield. Simpkin soon decided to stop selling other manufacturers' sweets, and to produce his own. In the early 1920s, he purchased a burnt out refrigeration factory in Hillsborough and built his own 40,000 square foot purpose-built factory, employing 180 staff.

Simpkin produced high quality glucose sweets from natural ingredients and aimed his product at a niche market, selling through dispensing chemists, thus avoiding competition with the major manufacturers. Simpkin had been given liquid glucose to recover from his wounds in WWI; finding it was not available in solid form, he decided to concentrate on making glucose travel sweets, at a time when a tin of sweets was seen as an important item to carry in the glovebox of a car. Within two years, his glucose sweets, named Simpkins' Orange Barley Sticks, could be found in 90% of pharmacies in the U.K.

The sweets were initially sold in large jars to outlets but Simpkin quickly changed to selling in individual airtight eight ounce tins because the sweets had a high fruit juice content, and would go sticky when exposed to moisture. The early tins were not entirely airtight; but in the 1950s, a completely airtight tin with no seams was introduced which kept the sweets fresh for years. The use of tins would become a marque for the company. At its peak, the company employed over 300 staff. During World War II, Simpkins high grade glucose sweets were produced for R.A.F. air crew on high altitude missions. The company also supplied glucose sweets to the 1953 British Mount Everest expedition. In February 2009, Simpkins won the best new British product at the Cologne confectionery show for its Dr. Stuart range of herbal sweets.

== Present day ==
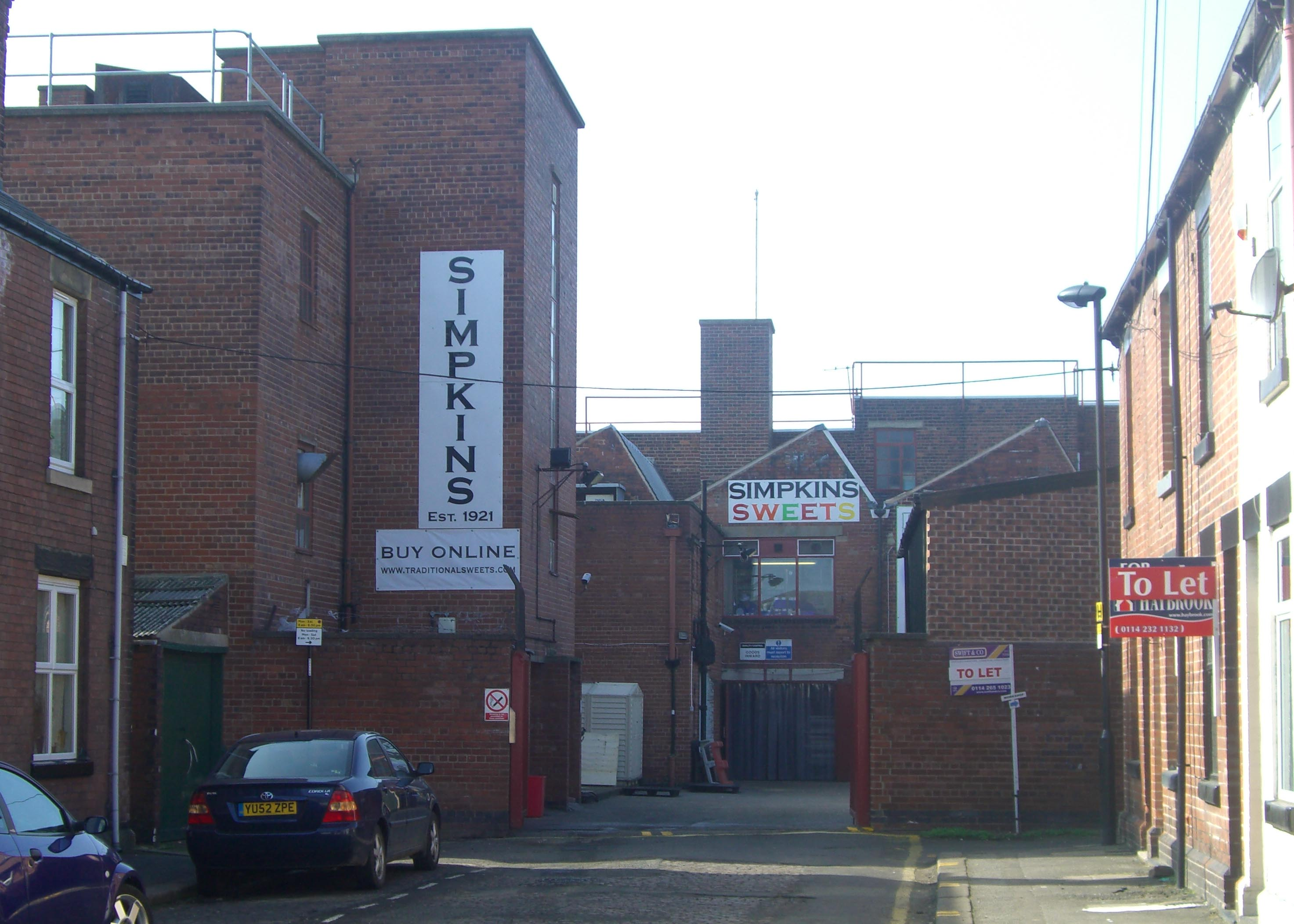
Simpkin's goods entrance on Roselle Street.

As of 2019, Simpkins export to over 40 countries throughout the world, accounting for 25% of their income. They produce 80 lines of sweets in Sheffield, and import 50 types of sugar free sweets which they bag. Increasing automation means that the firm now employs around 50 people. In addition to selling in pharmacies, the sweets are now available in Boots UK, W H Smith, Harrods, Fortnum & Mason and Tesco. In 2009, the company's income was over £3,000,000, producing 2,000,000 sweets (35,000 tins) a day. However, with profit margins falling on its core 200 gram tins, the firm have been looking at the possibility of also producing smaller 50 gram tins to appeal to a younger clientele; to do this, the firm would have to invest £50,000 on a new production line.

Albert Leslie Simpkin's three sons Neville, Brian and John joined the firm and continued the family business with John taking complete control in 2002. Today the firm is controlled by John's children Adrian and Karen Simpkin, who are joint managing directors.
