= 1820s Atlantic hurricane seasons =

The decade of the 1820s featured the 1820s Atlantic hurricane seasons. While data is not available for every storm that occurred, some parts of the coastline were populated enough to give data of hurricane occurrences. Each season was an ongoing event in the annual cycle of tropical cyclone formation in the Atlantic basin. Most tropical cyclone formation occurs between June 1 and November 30.

== 1820 Atlantic hurricane season ==
=== Hurricane One ===
The Winyaw Hurricane of 1820 September 8-10. A minimal hurricane moved from Florida on September 8 northward to hit near the border of North Carolina and South Carolina on September 10. It caused only minor damage. Part of cluster of hurricanes struck Charleston area in 1804, 1811, 1813, 1820, and 1822.

=== Hurricane Two ===
September 26–October 1. A hurricane was sighted at Dominica on September 26 before moving west-northwest through Hispaniola, then across the southwest Atlantic to South Carolina on October 1.

== 1821 Atlantic hurricane season ==
=== Tropical Storm One ===
September 1-9. A tropical storm moved westward across the Caribbean, from Guadeloupe on September 1 to western Cuba on September 9.

=== Hurricane Two ===
The Norfolk and Long Island Hurricane of 1821

The Norfolk and Long Island Hurricane was a deadly hurricane that rapidly moved up the Atlantic coast during the first few days of September. It included a hurricane landfall within the modern borders of New York City, the only recorded case of a hurricane eyewall moving directly over New York City to date. It caused 200 deaths, and is estimated to have been a Category 4 hurricane.

It was from the 1821 Norfolk and Long Island hurricane that William C. Redfield published his first account in the American Journal of Science and presented his first evidence that hurricanes had counter-clockwise rotation of destructive winds, but also traveled at a moderate forward speed. Redfield determined this from analysis of tree fall patterns he examined post hurricane in the New England forests that were impacted from the hurricane. This also corroborated John Farrar's previously published work a few years earlier in 1819 that a hurricane was a rotating counter-clockwise vortex. Redfield determined that hurricanes formed east of the Leeward Islands and then travel westwards at a moderate speed. William Reid of the Royal Engineers built on Redfield's work by studying logs of ships affected by the Great Hurricane of 1780.

=== Hurricane Three ===
The Middle Gulf Hurricane of 1821 Later in September, from the 15th–17th, a strong hurricane hit Mississippi. This was a very large storm, bringing storm surge flooding from Mobile to what is now Wakulla and Taylor Counties, Florida. 11 of the 13 vessels in the harbor at Pensacola Bay were lost, causing 35 deaths.

== 1822 Atlantic hurricane season ==
=== Tropical Storm One ===
The Early Tropical Storm of 1822 July 7-9. A hurricane struck the central Gulf coast between July 7 and July 9.

=== Hurricane Two ===
A minimal hurricane was centered offshore from the Carolinas coastline in August.

=== Hurricane Three ===
The Carolina Hurricane of 1822 This hurricane moved north-northwest from the Bahamas on September 25 to hit Charleston, South Carolina, on September 27. It claimed the lives of hundreds of slaves who found themselves trapped in the low-lying Santee Delta, miles from higher ground and with no shelter. It caused 300 (or more) deaths, but managed to break a drought in the Richmond area. Part of cluster of hurricanes struck Charleston area in 1804, 1811, 1813, 1820, and 1822. Fifteen members of the Myers family drowned after their Georgetown home was swept into the ocean. The family's sole survivor, Mordecai Myers, buried the victims, which included his parents.

=== Hurricane Four ===
From October 20 to the 22, a hurricane hit Virginia, causing heavy damage and winds in the Richmond area.

=== Hurricane Five ===
An Atlantic hurricane struck the River Mersey in England on December 5 and 6, as evidenced by the gravestone of Nelson Burt (nine-year-old son of Albin R. Burt) in the churchyard of St Lawrence's Church, Stoak.

=== Hurricane Six ===
A rare December hurricane moved through the eastern Caribbean Sea and eventually into Venezuela between December 13 and December 22.

== 1823 Atlantic hurricane season ==
=== Tropical Storm One ===
A tropical storm moved from Curaçao on July 8 to near Jamaica on July 10.

=== Tropical Storm Two ===
A tropical storm moved south of Jamaica on August 2 and 3.

=== Hurricane Three ===
September 11-14. A hurricane which formed in the west-central Gulf of Mexico on September 11 moved slowly northeast, striking the central Gulf coast on September 14.

== 1824 Atlantic hurricane season ==
=== Hurricane One ===
The Georgia Coastal Hurricane of 1824 or Hurricane San Pedro of 1824 September 7-15. A severe hurricane was sighted at Guadeloupe on September 7 and moved across the northeast Lesser Antilles. It passed very near south coast of Puerto Rico on September 9 and the southwest Atlantic to hit Florida on September 13, passing inland near Cape Florida and returning to sea near Cape Canaveral. A ship carrying the contractor and supplies for building three lighthouses in Florida was lost, possibly sunk by this storm. The storm then went ashore in Georgia and South Carolina on September 14, causing 100 deaths. It washed out all bridges between Darien and Savannah, Georgia. Moving northward, it hit Savannah and South Carolina before going out to sea. Because hurricanes were somewhat frequent, residents were used to evacuating the area. Those who did not evacuate saw the destruction caused by this strong hurricane. This is likely one of the strongest hurricanes to hit Georgia in its history.

=== Tropical Storm Two ===
Between September 26 and 27, a tropical storm moved south of Jamaica.

== 1825 Atlantic hurricane season ==
=== Hurricane One ===
Charleston Hurricane of 1825 May 28–June 5. A tropical storm formed south of Santo Domingo on May 28. It moved across Cuba on 1 June, and while moving across Florida it caused heavy winds on June 3. When it reached the western Atlantic it rapidly strengthened, hitting Charleston, South Carolina as a hurricane on June 4-5. The storm lost strength as it began moving up the U.S. East coast and out over the northwestern Atlantic Ocean.

=== Hurricane Two ===
On July 6, a moderate hurricane hit Puerto Rico, destroying six villages.

=== Hurricane Three ===
1825 Santa Ana hurricane July 25–August 2. On July 26, an extremely devastating hurricane struck Guadeloupe and Puerto Rico, causing at least 1,300 deaths and some 1,200 injuries. It was lasted noted west of Bermuda on August 1. This hurricane was one of the most intense tropical cyclones to strike Puerto Rico in the last few hundred years. While no atmospheric pressure readings are available from Puerto Rico, a minimum pressure of 918 mbar (27.1 inHg) in Guadeloupe suggest that the storm reached Category 5 strength (there are no officially observed Category 5 hurricanes before 1924). See List of deadliest Atlantic hurricanes.

=== Hurricane Four ===
September 28–October 3. A hurricane struck Haiti on September 28 and moved northwestward into northeast Florida by October 3.

=== Hurricane Five ===
During November 17 and 18, the schooner Harvest was wrecked on the North Carolina coast, probably near Nags Head, and five or more persons were killed in what may have been a late season hurricane.

== 1826 Atlantic hurricane season ==
=== Hurricane One ===
A hurricane hit the Cayman Islands and western Cuba on August 27, causing 33 deaths.

=== Tropical Storm Two ===
August 31-September 10. A tropical storm spotted near Dominica on August 31 moved west-northwest to Jamaica before moving northward to the Grand Banks by September 10.

=== Hurricane Three ===
A strong hurricane devastated Orotava Valley, Tenerife, and the rest of the Canary Islands off north Africa in November. About 500 – 1,000 dead from the hurricane.

== 1827 Atlantic hurricane season ==
=== Hurricane One ===
A minimal hurricane was reported near North Carolina on July 30.

=== Tropical Storm Two ===
Tropical Storm San Jacinto of 1827 August 17-23. A hurricane struck Antigua and Puerto Rico on August 17, and moved westward to Jamaica before continuing westward to Vera Cruz, Mexico.

=== Hurricane Three ===
The Great North Carolina Hurricane of 1827

August 20-27. A hurricane formed over the Windward Islands on August 18. It moved northwest through the Bahamas on the 21st, and hit Cape Hatteras on August 24. It moved up the Chesapeake Bay, causing higher than normal tides, and eventually through New England by August 27. This is known as the St. Kitts Hurricane.

=== Hurricane Four ===
August 19. A hurricane struck Belize City on August 19, 1827, and “drove all ships on shore at Belize.” It has been identified as ‘Event 5’ in Belizean sedimentary records by McCloskey and Keller.

=== Hurricane Five ===
August 27-September 5. A hurricane moved through the northern Leeward islands to northwest Florida from August 27 to September 5.

=== Tropical Storm Six ===
August 29-September 8. A tropical storm moved through the southwest Atlantic between the West Indies and Bermuda from August 29 to September 8.

== 1828 Atlantic hurricane season ==
=== Hurricane One ===
September 15-20. A hurricane moved from the northern Lesser Antilles on September 15 northward by Bermuda on September 19, where it caused a "severe gale" and sank 3 ships, before moving into the north Atlantic shipping lanes.

== 1829 Atlantic hurricane season ==
=== Tropical Storm One ===
July 9-13. A tropical storm moved through the Gulf of Mexico between July 9 and 13.

=== Hurricane Two ===
August 23-30. A minimal hurricane moved through South Carolina and the Outer Banks of North Carolina before moving northwest of Bermuda during the last week of August.

=== Hurricane Three ===
September 10. A hurricane hit the mouth of the Rio Grande, Port Isabel, Texas and Brazos Island, Texas on September 10 and those areas saw great destruction while other surrounding towns had higher than normal tides.

=== Hurricane Four ===
October 26. A hurricane hit St. Barts on October 26, possibly sinking one ship.

== See also ==
- Lists of Atlantic hurricanes
- Atlantic hurricane season
