= Tibor Varga (ice hockey) =

Slovak ice hockey player

- Born: 31 May 1985 (age 40) Bratislava, Czechoslovakia
- Height: 6 ft 1 in (185 cm)
- Weight: 203 lb (92 kg; 14 st 7 lb)
- Position: Left wing
- Shot: Right
- Played for: HC Slovan Bratislava; HK 91 Senica; HK Trnava; BK Havlíčkův Brod; MsHK Žilina; MHC Martin; HC Košice; HK Dukla Trenčín; Bratislava Capitals; HC Nové Zámky
- Playing career: 2009–2023

Tibor Varga (born 31 May 1985) is a Slovak professional ice hockey player. He is currently a free agent.

== Career ==
Varga previously played with HC Slovan Bratislava in the Slovak Extraliga, Bakersfield Condors of the ECHL, and the Huntsville Havoc and Mississippi Riverkings of the Southern Professional Hockey League.

== Career statistics ==
=== Regular season and playoffs ===
			Regular season					Playoffs
Season	Team	League	GP	G	A	Pts	PIM	GP	G	A	Pts	PIM
