= Reed (surname) =

- variations on red

Origin
- Language: English
- Meaning: literally, the colour red. It is a variant of Reid, which refers to ruddy complexion or red hair

Other names
- Variant form: Read

Reed is an English-language surname.

It is commonly believed to be a nickname-derived surname referring to a person's complexion or hair being ruddy or red, as its literal meaning is the colour red. It is a variant of Reid, which refers to ruddy complexion or red hair

People with the surname include:

- A. J. Reed (born 1993), American baseball player
- Adam Reed (disambiguation), multiple people, including:
  - Adam Reed (born 1970), American voice actor
  - Adam Reed (footballer, born 1975), English footballer
  - Adam Reed (footballer, born 1991), English footballer
- Al Reed (born Alfred Lloyd Reed, Jr. 1925–1990), New Orleans R&B musician
- Alaina Reed Hall (1946–2009), American actress
- Alan Reed (1907–1977), American voice actor
- Albert Edwin Reed (1846–1920), English publisher
- Albert Reed (model) (born 1985), American model
- Albert Reed Jr. (1910–1986), American actor and law enforcement officer
- Sir Alec Reed (1934–2025), British businessman
- Alec Reed Academy, British school of Studies
- Alex Reed (disambiguation), multiple people, including:
  - Alexander Wyclif Reed (1908–1979), New Zealand author
  - James Alexander Reed (1861–1944), American politician
  - Julian Alexander Arnott Reed (1936–2022), Canadian politician
- Alfred Hamish Reed (1875–1975), England, emigrated to New Zealand
- Alfred Reed (1921–2005), US conductor and composer
- Allison Reed (born 1994), American ice dancer
- Alto Reed (1948–2020), American saxophonist
- Alvin Reed (born 1944), American football player
- Alyson Reed (born 1958), American dancer
- Amanda Reed (1832–1904), US philanthropist widow of Simeon Gannett Reed
- Andre Reed (born 1964), American football player
- Andrew Reed (disambiguation), multiple people, including:
  - Andrew Reed (baseball), American baseball player
  - Andrew Reed (minister) (1787–1862), British Congregational minister and philanthropist
  - Andrew Reed (police officer) (1837–1914), inspector in the Irish police force
  - Andrew Reed (rower), American rower
- Andy Reed (rugby union) (born 1969), Scottish rugby union player
- Andrew Joseph Reed or A. J. Reed (born 1993), American baseball player
- Andy Reed (politician) (born 1964), British politician
- Ann Reed (born 1954), American singer-songwriter
- Anna M. Morrison Reed (1849/50-1921), American author, lecturer, poet, and suffragist
- Arthur Reed, multiple people, including:
  - Arthur Reed (footballer, born 1894) (1894–?), English footballer
  - Arthur Reed (politician) (1881–1961), British Member of Parliament for Exeter, 1931–1945
  - Arthur Reed (1860–1984), American longevity claimant, died aged 123 years, 292 days; see longevity claims
  - Arthur Reed (RAF officer) (1898–?), World War I flying ace
  - Arthur Reed (Australian footballer) (1883–1951), Australian rules footballer
- Austin Reed (disambiguation), multiple people
- B. Mitchel Reed (born "Burton Mitchel Goldberg" 1926–1983), US radio disc jockey
- Barry Reed (author) (1927–2002), US trial lawyer and novelist
- Basil Reed (1895–1968), England cricketer and Royal Navy officer
- Betty Lou Reed (1927–2011), American politician
- Betty Reed (1941–2022), American politician
- Bill Reed (born 1954), Canadian ice hockey player
- Billy Reed (footballer) (1928–2003), Welsh footballer
- Billy Reed (baseball) (1922–2005), American baseball player
- Bob Reed (baseball) (born 1945), American baseball player
- Bobby Reed (American football) (born 1939), American football player
- P. Booker Reed (1842–1913), American politician
- Brandon Reed (born 1980), American politician
- Brandy Reed (born 1977), American basketball player
- Brett Reed (born 1972), American drummer, guitarist with Rancid
- Brett Reed (basketball) (born 1972), American basketball coach
- Butch Reed Bruce Franklin Reed (1954–2021), American wrestler
- Byron Reed (1821–1891), real estate agent and politician in Nebraska, US
- Caitriona Reed (born 1949), American Zen Buddhist sensei
- Carlson Reed (born 2002), American baseball player
- Carol Reed (weather broadcaster) (c. 1925–1970), "The weather girl" New York weathercaster
- Carol Reed (1906–1976), (male) England film producer and director
- Caroline Keating Reed (died 1954), American pianist and music teacher
- Cathy Reed (born 1987), American ice dancer in Japan, sister of Chris Reed
- Chad Reed (born 1982), Australian motocross rider
- Charles Manning Reed (1803–1871), Whig politician in Pennsylvania
- Charles N. Reed (1837–1926), farmer and politician in New York
- Sir Charles Reed (British politician) (1819–1881), politician and antiquarian
- Chauncey W. Reed (1890–1956), American WWI veteran, lawyer and politician
- Chester Albert Reed (1876–1912), American ornithologist, artist and writer
- Chris Reed (figure skater) (born 1989), American ice skater in Japan
- Chuck Reed (born 1948), American lawyer politician
- Chuck Reed (gridiron football) (born 1970), American football player
- Clarke Reed (1928–2024), American businessman and politician
- Clyde M. Reed (1871–1949), American politician
- Crystal Reed (born 1985), American actress in Teen Wolf
- Cyril Reed (1906–1991), Indian cricketer in England and Malaya
- D. J. Reed (born 1996), American football player
- Dan Reed (born 1963), American rock musician and founder of Dan Reed Network
- Dan Reed (director) (born 1964), British director of Leaving Neverland
- Daniel Reed (disambiguation), multiple people, including:
  - Daniel Reed (actor) (1892–1978), American stage actor, director and playwright
  - Daniel Reed (table tennis) (born 1989), British table tennis player
  - Daniel Reed (Canadian politician) (1858–1935), Canadian politician
  - Daniel A. Reed (computer scientist), computer scientist, provost of University of Utah
  - Daniel A. Reed (politician) (1875–1959), American football coach
- Darrell Reed (born 1965), American football player
- Dave Reed, Texas DJ, member of duo Tritonal (band)
- Dave L. Reed (born 1978), member of the Pennsylvania State House
- David Reed (disambiguation), multiple people, including:
  - David Reed (American football) (born 1987), wide receiver with Indianapolis Colts
  - David Reed (artist) (born 1946), American abstract painter
  - David Reed (bishop) (1927–2023), American Episcopal bishop
  - David Reed (comedian) (born 1982), British actor and comedian
  - David Reed (pioneer) (1747–1824) pioneer in Pennsylvania
  - David Reed (Labour politician) (1945–2017), British Labour Party MP
  - David A. Reed (1880–1953), American Senator from Pennsylvania, 1923–1935
  - David C. Reed (1847–1938), mayor of San Diego, California
  - David E. Reed (1927–1990), Reader's Digest editor
  - David Jay Reed (born 1950), Japan-born artist in Perth, Western Australia
  - David M. Reed (born 1957), American Episcopal bishop in Texas
  - David P. Reed (born 1952), computer scientist, designer of user datagram protocol (UDP)
  - David Vern Reed (1924–1989), American comics writer, known for Batman
  - David Wellington Reed (1972–1985), known for Murder of David Reed in US, solved in 2008
- Dean Reed (1938–1986), American singer and actor in East Germany, dubbed "Red Elvis"
- Dewey H. Reed (1897–1966), American educator and politician
- Dizzy Reed (born 1963), American keyboardist with Guns N' Roses
- Dominic Reed (born 1990), English cricketer
- Don Reed (American football) (1920–2012), coach for Long Beach State 49ers
- Don Reed (comedian) (born 1959), American actor, writer, producer, director and comedian
- Don Reed (politician) (1933–1996), American politician, member of the Florida House of Representatives
- Don Collins Reed, American ethicist and historian of philosophy
- Donald Reed (disambiguation), multiple people, including:
  - Donald Reed (actor) (1901–1973), Mexican-American film actor, and later, Beverly Hills video consultant
  - Donald A. Reed (1935–2001), founder of Academy of Science Fiction, Fantasy and Horror Films and its Saturn Awards
- Donna Reed (1921–1986), American actress in It's a Wonderful Life and sitcom The Donna Reed Show
- Dorothy Reed Mendenhall (1874–1964), American pediatric physician, graduate of Johns Hopkins School of Medicine
- Doug Reed (born 1960), American football defensive end with Los Angeles Rams
- Douglas Reed (1895–1976), British journalist, writer and anti-Zionist
- E. Ray Reed (1891–1970), West Virginia Republican politician
- Ed Reed (born 1978), American football player with Baltimore Ravens
- Eddie Reed (1901–1960), American lawyer and college football coach
- Eddie Reed (baseball) (1929–2009), American Negro league baseball player
- Edward Reed (disambiguation), multiple people, including:
  - Edward Reed (coach), American water polo coach
  - Edward Reed (naval architect) (1830–1906), British naval architect and politician
  - Edward C. Reed (1793–1883), American veteran of War of 1812, lawyer and politician
  - Edward Cornelius Reed Jr. (1924–2013), American federal judge
  - Edward S. Reed (1954–1997), American ecological psychologist and philosopher
  - Edward Tennyson Reed (1860–1933), British cartoonist for Punch magazine
  - T. Edward Reed, Canadian zoologist, anthropologist, and pediatrician
- Elijah W. Reed (1827–1888), American menhaden fishing pioneer in Virginia
- Elizabeth Armstrong Reed (1842–1915), American author and Orientalist scholar
- Enrique Reed (1915–1958), Chilean chess master
- Eric Reed (baseball) (born 1980), with the Florida Marlins
- Eric Reed (musician) (born 1970), American jazz pianist and composer
- Eric Reed (soccer player) (born 1983), American goalkeeper and coach
- Esther Reed (born 1978), American criminal
- Eugene Elliott Reed (1866–1940), Democrat congressman from New Hampshire
- Evelyn Reed (1905–1979), American communist and women's rights activist
- Francine Reed (born 1947), American blues singer associated with Lyle Lovett
- Frank Reed (disambiguation), multiple people
- Fred Reed (disambiguation), multiple people
- Gary Reed (athlete) (born 1981), Canadian middle-distance runner
- Gary Reed (comics) (1956–2016), American comic book writer and publisher
- Sir Geoffrey Reed (1892–1970), Australian judge and director-general of ASIO
- George Reed (disambiguation), multiple people
- Guilford Bevil Reed (1887–1955), Canadian medical researcher
- H. Owen Reed (1910–2014), American composer, conductor, and educator
- Hamilton Lyster Reed (1869–1931), Irish officer in British Army, VC recipient
- Harrison Reed (ice hockey) (born 1988), Canadian player with Hamburg Crocodiles
- Harrison Reed (politician) (1813–1899), American editor and Governor of Florida
- Helen Reed (1864–1936), American educator and politician
- Helen Leah Reed (1861/62 – 1926), Canadian-born American writer
- Henry Reed (disambiguation), multiple people, including:
  - Henry Reed (American football) (born 1948), defensive end with New York Giants
  - Henry Reed (cricketer) (1892–1963), played for Gloucestershire
  - Henry Reed (merchant) (1806–1880), British merchant, philanthropist and evangelist
  - Henry Reed (musician) (1884–1968), Appalachian fiddler and banjoist, with Alan Jabbour
  - Henry Reed (poet) (1914–1986), British poet, translator, radio dramatist, and journalist
  - Henry Reed (Wisconsin legislator), Democratic member of the Wisconsin State Assembly
  - Henry Armstrong Reed (1858–1876), killed at Battle of the Little Bighorn, nephew of George Armstrong Custer
  - Henry Byron Reed (1855–1896), English Conservative Party politician
  - Henry Hope Reed (1808–1854), American educator at University of Pennsylvania
  - Henry Hope Reed Jr. (1915–2013), American architecture critic and preservationist
  - Henry Thomas Reed (1846–1924), American federal judge
  - Henry Reed (I Know Why the Caged Bird Sings), student mentioned in Maya Angelou's autobiography
- Herbert Reed (British Army soldier) (Henry Herbert Reed, 1911–1941), British sailor, George Cross recipient
- Howie Reed (1936–1984), baseball pitcher for Los Angeles Dodgers
- Hub Reed (1936–2024), American basketball player with Los Angeles Lakers in NBA
- Ian Reed (1927–2020), Australian Olympic discus thrower
- Ida Lilliard Reed (1865–1951), religious writer and hymnwriter from West Virginia
- Irving S. Reed (1923–2012), American mathematician known for Reed–Solomon and Reed–Muller codes
- Isaac Reed (politician) (1809–1887), Whig congressman from Maine
- Isaac Reed (1742–1807), English Shakespeare editor
- Ishmael Reed (born 1938), African American poet, writer, songwriter and publisher
- J. R. Reed (disambiguation), multiple people, including:
  - J. R. Reid (born 1968), American basketball player
  - J. R. Reed (American football, born 1982), US, American football
  - J. R. Reed (American football, born 1996), American football safety
  - JR Reed (actor) (born 1967), American actor and singer
- Jack Reed (disambiguation), multiple people, including:
  - Jack Reed (baseball) (1933–2022), outfielder for the New York Yankees
  - Jack Reed (Mississippi politician) (1924–2016), American Mississippi politician
  - Jack Reed (Rhode Island politician) (born 1949), United States Senator
  - Jack Reed (rugby league) (born 1988), English player in Australia
- Jake Reed (American football) (born 1967), wide receiver for Minnesota Vikings
- Jake Reed (baseball) (born 1992), pitcher for New York Mets and Baltimore Orioles
- James Reed (disambiguation), multiple people, including:
  - James Reed (defensive tackle) (born 1977), defensive tackle in the NFL
  - James Reed (soldier) (c. 1723–1807), military officer in the American Revolution
  - James A. Reed (entrepreneur) (born 1963), English businessman, son of Sir Alec Reed
  - James A. Reed (politician) (1861–1944), Democratic Party politician from Missouri
  - James B. Reed (1881–1935), Democratic Party politician from Arkansas
  - James Sewall Reed (1832–1864), American Civil War cavalry officer
- Jamie Reed (born 1973), British Labour Party MP
- Jamie Reed (footballer) (born 1987), Welsh (soccer )footballer and coach
- Janet Reed (1916–2000), American ballerina and ballet mistress
- Jarran Reed (born 1992), American football player
- Ja'seem Reed (born 2003), American football player
- Jayden Reed (born 2000), American football player
- Jaylen Reed (born 2003), American football player
- Jeff Reed (disambiguation), multiple people, including:
  - Jeff Reed (baseball) (born 1962), American baseball catcher
  - Jeff Reed (American football) (born 1979), American football place kicker
  - Jeff Reed, candidate in the 2010 United States House of Representatives elections in Missouri
- Jennie Reed (born 1978), American Olympic track cyclist
- Jennifer Clyburn Reed, American schoolteacher and businesswoman
- Jeremy Reed (born 1981), American Major League baseball outfielder
- Jeremy Reed (writer) (born 1951), Jersey-born poet, novelist, biographer and literary critic
- Jerrick Reed II (born 2000), American football player
- Jerry Reed (1937–2008), American singer songwriter in Country Music Hall of Fame
- Jerry Reed (baseball) (born 1955), American baseball pitcher
- Jim Reed (academic) Terence James Reed (born 1937) English scholar of German literature
- Jimmy Reed (1925–1976), popular US blues musician
- Jo Reed (killed 1875), US police killer; see Lynching of Jo Reed
- Joan Reed (born 1952), English athlete and coach in the sport of curling
- Jody Reed (born 1962), American second baseman and coach for Miami Marlins
- Joe Reed (disambiguation), multiple people, including:
  - Joe Reed (quarterback) (born 1948), American football quarterback
  - Joe Reed (wide receiver) (born 1998), American football wide receiver
  - Joe L. Reed (born 1938), American educator and Democratic Party politician
- John Reed (disambiguation), multiple people, including:
  - John Reed, American miner, founder of the Reed Gold Mine in North Carolina
  - John Reed Jr. (1781–1860), American politician from Massachusetts, son of John Reed Sr.
  - John Reed Sr. (1751–1831), American politician from Massachusetts, left Congress in 1801
  - John Reed (actor) (1916–2010), English actor and singer with the D'Oyly Carte Opera Company
  - John Reed (animator) (1908–1992), American animator and painter
  - John Reed (art patron) (1901–1981), Australian critic, husband of Sunday Reed
  - John Reed (early Californian) (1805–1843), early settler and landowner in Marin County
  - John Reed (footballer) (born 1972), English footballer who played primarily for Sheffield United
  - John Reed (fur trader) (died 1814), American fur trader
  - John Reed (journalist) (1887–1920), American journalist and Communist activist
  - John Reed (judge) (1864–1955), New Zealand judge
  - John Reed (novelist) (born 1969), American author and teacher
  - John Reed (priest) (born 1951), English Archdeacon of Taunton
  - John A. Reed Jr. (1931–2015), American lawyer and judge
  - John C. Reed (born 1958), American medical researcher
  - John H. Reed (1921–2012), American politician, 66th governor of Maine
  - John M. Reed (c. 1881–1934), American college sports coach
  - John O. Reed (1929–2012), British anthologist and translator of African literature
  - John Oren Reed (1856–1916), American physicist and university dean
  - John S. Reed (born 1939), American financier
  - John Shedd Reed (1917–2008), American chairman of Santa Fe Industries, president of Shedd Aquarium
  - John Shelton Reed (born 1942), American sociologist and essayist
  - John T. Reed, American real estate investor and author
  - John W. Reed (1918–2018), American law professor and dean
- Johnny Reed, African American baseball player in the 1930s
- Joseph Reed (disambiguation), multiple people, including:
  - Joseph Reed (architect) (c. 1823–1890), Australian architect
  - Joseph Reed (lawyer) (1772–1846), Pennsylvania Attorney General
  - Joseph Reed (playwright) (1723–1787), English playwright and poet
  - Joseph Reed (politician) (1741–1785), Continental Congressmen, aide-de-camp to George Washington
  - Joseph Haythorne Reed (1828–1858), British Member of Parliament
  - Joseph Rea Reed (1835–1925), U.S. Representative from Iowa
  - Joseph Verner Reed Jr. (1937–2016), American banker and diplomat
- Josh Reed (born 1980), American football wide receiver in the NFL
- Julia Reed (disambiguation), multiple people
- Julian Reed Julian Alexander Arnott Reed (1936–2022), Canadian politician
- Justin Reed (born 1982), American basketball player
- Kate Reed (born 1982), British long-distance runner
- Kerry Reed (born 1984), American football wide receiver
- Kevin Reed (born 1955), American Presbyterian author, theologian and publisher
- Kira Reed (born 1971), American actress, TV host, writer, and producer
- Langford Reed (1878–1954), English scriptwriter of silent film era and limerick collector
- Larry Reed, US bassist with Shoot Low Sheriff
- Larry Reed (puppeteer) (born 1944), uses traditional Balinese shadow theatre techniques
- Laurance Reed (born 1937), English Conservative Party politician and political writer
- Lawrence Reed (born 1953), American economist and free-market exponent
- Leaeno Reed (1918–1974), American Samoan chief and politician
- Leo Reed (1939–2022), American labor leader
- Leon Reed, American football quarterback with Maryland Commandos
- Les Reed (football manager) (born 1952), English football coach, manager of Charlton Athletic
- Les Reed (songwriter) (1935–2019), English writer of popular songs
- Lewis E. Reed (born 1962), American politician in Missouri
- Lionel Reed (1883–1957), British athlete at the 1908 Summer Olympics
- Lloyd Reed (1961–2015), American police officer killed in the line of duty
- Lou Reed (1942–2013), American musician with Velvet Underground
- Lowell Reed (1886–1966), research scientist and president of Johns Hopkins University
- Lucy Reed (1921–1998), American jazz singer in Chicago in the 1950s
- Luman Reed (1787–1836), American merchant and arts patron
- Luther Reed (1888–1961), American theater critic, screenwriter and film director
- Malik Reed (born 1996), American football linebacker for Miami Dolphins in NFL
- Marcel Reed, American football player
- Mark Reed (disambiguation), multiple people, including:
  - Mark Reed (academic), President of St. Joseph's University
  - Mark Reed (American football) (born 1959), American football quarterback
  - Mark Reed (baseball) (born 1986), catcher for the Arizona Diamondbacks
  - Mark Reed (figure skater), British ice dancer
  - Mark Reed (physicist) (1955–2021), American physicist
  - Mark Reed (racing driver) (born 1969), American racing driver
  - Mark Reed (sculptor) (born 1971), British sculptor
  - Mark E. Reed (1866–1933), American politician in the state of Washington
- Marlyce Polk Reed (born 1955), American composer
- Marshall Russell Reed (1891–1973), American bishop of The Methodist Church
- Martin Reed (born 1978), English footballer for York City
- Maxwell Reed (1919–1974), Irish actor in 1940s and 1950s British films
- Michael C. Reed (born 1942), American mathematician
- Michael Reed (cricketer) (born 1988), English cricketer
- Milt Reed (1890–1938), American baseball middle infielder
- Myrtle Reed (1874–1911), American author, poet, journalist, and philanthropist
- Natina Reed (1980–2012), American singer and rapper
- Nikki Reed (born 1988), American actress
- Nikko Reed (born 2003), American football player
- Nori Reed, American comedian and writer
- Ola Belle Reed (1916–2002), American Appalachian folk singer
- Oliver Reed (1938–1999), English actor
- Orson Reed (1809–c.1890), Wisconsin pioneer
- Oscar Reed (born 1944), American football running back with Minnesota Vikings
- P. Booker Reed (1842–1913), mayor of Louisville, Kentucky, moved to Canada
- Pam Reed (born 1961), American ultramarathon runner
- Pamela Reed (born 1949), American actress
- Patrick Reed (born 1990), American professional golfer
- Paul Reed (disambiguation), multiple people, including:
  - Paul Reed (actor) (1909–2007), American actor
  - Paul Reed (artist) (1919–2015), American artist
  - Paul Reed (basketball) (born 1999), American basketball player
  - Paul Reed (writer) (1956–2002), American writer
  - Paul Reed Smith (born 1956), luthier and founder of PRS Guitars
- Pete Reed (aid worker) (1989–2023), American aid worker
- Pete Reed (born 1981), American-born British Olympic gold medalist rower
- Peter Reed (disambiguation), multiple people, including:
  - Peter Reed (athlete) (born 1943), British Olympic athlete
  - Peter Reed (criminal), Australian criminal acquitted of Russell Street Bombing
- Peyton Reed (born 1964), American TV and film director
- Phil Reed (1949–2008), first openly gay African-American member of New York City Council
- Philip D. Reed (1899–1989), chief executive officer of General Electric Company
- Philip Reed (politician) (1760–1829), US senator for Maryland
- Phillip Reed (1908–1996), American actor
- Preston Reed (born 1955), American fingerstyle guitarist, emigrated to Scotland
- Ralph Reed (born 1961), American political lobbyist, with Christian Coalition
- Ralph Reed (American Express) (1890–1968), president of the American Express Company
- Raphew Reed Jr (born 1985), American hurdler at the 2004 Summer Paralympics
- Rayshun Reed (born 1981), American football defensive back with San Francisco 49ers in NFL
- Rex Reed (1938–2026), American film critic, journalist, and media personality
- Richard Reed (born 1973), British businessman, entrepreneur and public speaker
- Rick Reed (advertising agent) (1953–2022), Republican advertising agent
- Rick Reed (umpire) (1950–2020), umpire in Major League Baseball
- Rick Reed (pitcher) (born 1964), pitcher in Major League Baseball
- Ricky Reed (born Eric Burton Frederic in 1982), American artist and musician
- Rob Reed, keyboardist with Welsh progressive rock band Magenta
- Robert Reed (disambiguation), multiple people, including:
  - Robert Reed John Robert Rietz Jr. (1932–1992), US actor
  - Robert Reed (artist) (1938–2014), American artist
  - Robert Reed (author) (born 1956), American science fiction author
  - Robert Reed (bishop), also Reade (died 1415), bishop in Ireland and England
  - Robert Reed (guard) (1943–2009), American football player
  - Robert Reed (wide receiver) (born 1975), American football wide receiver
  - Robert Reed, Baron Reed of Allermuir (born 1956), Scottish jurist
  - Robert H. Reed (1929–2017), general in the United States Air Force
  - Robert P. Reed (born 1959), American Roman Catholic bishop
  - Robert Rentoul Reed (1807–1864), American politician, U.S. Representative from Pennsylvania
- Robin Reed (wrestler) (1899–1978), American wrestler and wrestling coach
- Rodney Reed (born 1967), American murder and rapist
- Ron Reed, known as Buddy Colt (1936–2021), American professional wrestler
- Ron Reed (born 1942), American basketball player and Major League Baseball pitcher
- Rosalie A. Reed (born 1945), US veterinarian at the Los Angeles Zoo
- Roy Reed (1930–2017), American journalist, wrote for The New York Times
- Roy E. Reed (1877–1943), Americans lawyer and Republican Party politician
- Sam Reed (born 1941), American accountant and Republican Party politician
- Shanna Reed (born 1955), American dancer and TV and movie actress
- Simeon Gannett Reed (1830–1895), American transportation businessman
- Stanley Forman Reed (1884–1980), American lawyer and Supreme Court judge
- Stanley Foster Reed (1917–2007), American entrepreneur, inventor, and publisher
- Stanley Reed (British politician) (1872–1969), British editor of The Times of India
- Stephen Reed (physician) (1801–1877), American newspaper publisher and geologist
- Stephen Reed (footballer) (born 1985), English footballer
- Stephen R. Reed (1949–2020), American politician, mayor of Harrisburg, Pennsylvania
- Steve Reed (disambiguation), multiple people, including:
  - Steve Reed (baseball) (born 1965), American baseball player
  - Steve Reed (footballer, born 1956), English footballer
  - Steve Reed (politician) (born 1963), British Labour politician, MP for Croydon North
  - Steve Reed (soccer executive), president of the Canadian Soccer Association
- Steven Reed (mayor) (born 1973/74), American judge and Mayor of Montgomery, Alabama
- Steven Reed (political scientist) (born 1947), professor of modern government at Chuo University
- Stewart Reid (1867–1952), New Zealand Reform Party politician
- Stuart Reed (disambiguation), multiple people, including:
  - Stuart F. Reed (1866–1935), American politician
  - Stuart Reid (English journalist) (born 1943), English writer and editor
  - Stuart Reid (Scottish historical writer) (born 1954), writer, analyst and former soldier
  - Stuart Reid (children's book author), Scottish writer
  - Stuart Reid (rugby union) (born 1970), Scottish rugby player
  - Stuart Reid (politician), member of the Utah State Senate
- Sunday Reed, née Baillieu (1905–1981), Australian
- Susan Reed (disambiguation), multiple people, including:
  - Susan Reed (district attorney) (born 1950), former district attorney of Bexar County, Texas, U.S.
  - Susan Reed (singer) (1926–2010), American singer, harpist, zitherist and actor
  - Susan Reed, US swimmer at synchronised swimming at the 1986 World Aquatics Championships
- Sykes Reed (1904–1972), US basketball player at the University of Pittsburgh
- T. S. Reed (Thomas Sadler Reed, 1818–1914), public servant in South Australia
- Talbot Baines Reed (1852–1893), English typefounder and writer for The Boy's Own Paper
- Tanoai Reed (born 1974), American stuntman and actor
- Tarris Reed (born 2003), American basketball player
- Taylor Reed (born 1991), American gridiron football linebacker
- Tayo Reed (born 1973), American dancer with The Nitro Girls, later dance instructor
- Ted Reed Ralph Edwin Reed (1890–1959), American baseball third baseman for the Newark Pepper
- Thell Reed, American marksman, exhibition shooter, stuntman, armorer, and movie consultant
- Theodore Reed (1887–1959), American film director, producer
- Theresa Greene Reed (1923–2017), American physician and epidemiologist
- Thomas Reed (disambiguation), multiple people, including:
  - Thomas Reed (architect) (1817–1878), Danish architect
  - Thomas Reed (British Army officer) (1796–1883), British general
  - Thomas Brackett Reed (1839–1902), Speaker of the House of Representatives from Maine
  - Thomas Buck Reed (1787–1829), senator from Mississippi
  - Thomas C. Reed (1934–2024), American Secretary of the Air Force and nuclear weapons designer
  - Thomas Reed (Alabama politician), Alabama civil rights leader and state politician
  - Thomas German Reed (1817–1888), English actor, composer, and theatrical manager
  - Thomas Sadler Reed (1818–1914), England emigrated to South Australia
- Timothy Davis-Reed, American film, television and theater actor, teacher of acting
- Tom Reed (disambiguation), multiple people, including:
  - Tom Reed (screenwriter) (1901–1961), American screenwriter
  - Tom Reed (bishop) (1902–1995), Anglican Archbishop of Adelaide
  - Tom Reed (American football) (1945–2022), American football coach
  - Tom Reed (judoka) (born 1986), British judo player
  - Tom Reed (politician) (born 1971), representative for the state of New York
- Tracy Reed (disambiguation), multiple people, including:
  - Tracy Reed (American actress) (born 1949), African American actress
  - Tracy Reed (English actress), née Pelissier (1942–2012)
  - Tracy Reed (writer), American internet writer
- Travis Reed (born 1979), American professional basketballer
- Trovon Reed (born 1990), American football cornerback
- Trudie Kibbe Reed, American academic administrator
- Tucker Reed (born 1989), American blogger, author, journalist and feminist activist
- Tyler Reed, multiple people, including:
  - Tyler Reed (American football) (born 1982), American football guard, played for Chicago Bears
  - Tyler Reed (swimmer) (born 1988), member of US team at 2012 FINA World Championships
- Victor Joseph Reed (1905–1971), Roman Catholic bishop of Oklahoma City-Tulsa
- Vivian Reed (disambiguation), multiple people, including:
  - Vivian Reed (musical theatre actress), African-American actress, singer, and dancer
  - Vivian Reed (silent film actress) (1894–1989), American silent film actress
- Walt Reed (1917–2005), art historian and author
- Walter Reed, multiple people, including:
  - Walter Reed (born 1970), known as Killah Priest, US rapper
  - Walter Reed (1851–1902), US Army physician and epidemiologist
  - Walter Reed (actor) (1916–2001), American stage, film and television actor
  - Walter Reed (Canadian politician) (1869–1945) in Quebec Legislative Assembly
  - Walter Reed (cricketer) (1839–1880), English cricketer, brother of Albert Reed
  - Walter D. Reed (1924–2022), United States Air Force general
  - Walter L. Reed (1877–1956), U.S. Army general and son of Major Walter Reed
- Whitney Reed (1932–2015), American tennis player in the 1950s and 1960s
- William B. Reed (politician) (1833–1909), mayor of South Norwalk, Connecticut, US
- William Bradford Reed (1806–1876), American attorney, politician, diplomat, academic and journalist
- William Maxwell Reed (1871–1962), American teacher and author of science books for children
- William Reed (disambiguation), multiple people
- Willis Reed (1942–2023), America professional basketball player, coach, and manager

== Fictional characters ==
- Ellen Reed, a character who appeared in five episodes of the American TV sitcom Family Ties
- Louis Reed, a character in the film The Adam Project

== See also ==
- Red (nickname)
- Redd (given name)
- Redd (surname)
- Reade (name), given name and surname
- Rhead
- Read (surname)
- Reid (disambiguation)
