= David Reed =

David Reed may refer to:

== Entertainment ==
- David Vern Reed (1914–1984), American comics writer
- David E. Reed (1927–1990), Reader's Digest editor
- David Reed (artist) (born 1946), American artist
- David Jay Reed (born 1950), artist
- David Reed (comedian) (born 1982), British actor and comedian
- Dave Reed, member of trance group Tritonal

== Politics ==
- David C. Reed (1847–1938), mayor of San Diego, California
- David A. Reed (1880–1953), U.S. Senator from Pennsylvania, 1923–1935
- Dave L. Reed (born 1978), member of the Pennsylvania State House
- David Reed (Labour politician) (1945–2017), British Labour Party Member of Parliament, 1970–1974
- David Reed (Conservative politician), British Conservative Party Member of Parliament, 2024–

== Religion ==
- David Reed (bishop) (1927–2023), American Episcopal bishop of Colombia and Kentucky
- David M. Reed (born 1957), American Episcopal bishop of West Texas

== Sports ==
- David Reed (American football) (born 1987), American football player

== Other ==
- David Reed (pioneer), American pioneer
- David P. Reed (born 1952), computer scientist, designer of user datagram protocol
- David Wellington Reed (1972–1985), American teenager whose murder was unsolved for 24 years

== See also ==
- David Reid (disambiguation)
- David Read (disambiguation)
