= David Read =

David Read is the name of:

- David Charles Read (1790–1851), English painter and etcher
- David Breakenridge Read (1823–1904), Canadian lawyer, educator, author and mayor of Toronto
- David William Lister Read (1922–2015), author
- David Read (footballer) (born 1941), footballer for Chester City
- David Read (botanist), British professor of plant science
- David H. C. Read (1910–2001), Scottish Presbyterian clergyman and author
- David G. Read, American Episcopal bishop of West Texas

== See also ==
- David Reed (disambiguation)
- David Reid (disambiguation)
