= Stephen Reid =

Stephen Reid may refer to:

- Stephen Reid (artist) (1873–1948), British painter and illustrator
- Stephen Reid (writer) (1950–2018), Canadian writer and bank robber
- Stephen Reid (Coronation Street), character on the British soap opera Coronation Street

== See also ==
- Steven Reid (born 1981), Irish football player
- Steven Reid (harness racer), driver of standardbred racehorses in New Zealand
- Steve Reid (disambiguation)
- Steve Reed (disambiguation)
