= Arden, West Virginia =

Arden is the name of two unincorporated communities in the U.S. state of West Virginia.

- Arden, Barbour County, West Virginia
- Arden, Berkeley County, West Virginia
