= David Reid =

David or Dave Reid may refer to:

== Sport ==
- David Reid (footballer, born 1896) (1896–1963), Scottish footballer
- David Reid (Hibernian footballer), Scottish footballer
- David Reid (footballer, born 1923), Scottish footballer, see List of Rochdale A.F.C. players (25–99 appearances)
- David Reid (Gaelic footballer) (born 1983/1984), Irish sportsman
- David Reid (boxer) (born 1973), American boxer
- David Reid (curler) (born 1987), Scottish curler
- Dave Reid (ice hockey, born 1934) (1934–2021), Canadian ice hockey player
- Dave Reid (ice hockey, born 1964), Canadian ice hockey player

== Politics ==
- David Settle Reid (1813–1891), American governor of North Carolina
- Sir David Reid, 1st Baronet (1872–1939), British Member of Parliament for East Down and Down
- David Reid (politician) (1933–2017), former member of the Western Australian Legislative Assembly
- David A. Reid (born 1962), American politician in Virginia

== Others ==
- David Boswell Reid (1805–1863), Scottish physician, chemist and inventor
- David Reid (businessman) (born 1947), chairman of Kwik Fit, former chairman of Tesco
- David Reid, British musician and founding member of The Contrast
- Magog (DC Comics), whose alter-ego is named David Reid

== See also ==
- SS David C. Reid, an American molasses tanker that sank in 1928
- David Reed (disambiguation)
- David Read (disambiguation)
