= Stuart Reed =

Stuart Reed or Stuart Reid or Stewart Reed or Stewart Reid may refer to:

== People ==
- Stuart F. Reed (1866–1935), American politician
- Stewart Reid (1867–1952), New Zealand politician
- Stuart Reid (English journalist) (born 1943), English writer and editor
- Stuart Reid (Scottish historical writer) (born 1954), writer, analyst and former soldier
- Stuart Reid (children's book author), Scottish writer
- Stuart Reid (rugby union) (born 1970), Scottish rugby player
- Stuart Reid (politician), member of the Utah State Senate
- Stuart Reid (veterinarian), British veterinary surgeon and academic
- Stuart Reid, Canadian glass artist, creator of large artwork for the Living Arts Centre in Mississauga, Ontario in 1997
- Stuart Reed, character in Silent Enemy, a Star Trek: Enterprise episode

== Other uses ==
- Stewart Reed design
