= Edward Reed =

Edward, Ed, or Eddie Reed or Read may refer to:

== Politics ==
- Edward C. Reed (1793–1883), American politician
- Edward Reed (naval architect) (1830–1906), British naval architect and politician
- E. Ray Reed (1891–1970), West Virginia politician
- Edward Read (politician), Vermont politician

== Sports ==
- Eddie Reed (1901–1960), American lawyer and college football coach
- Eddie Reed (baseball) (1929–2009), American Negro league baseball player
- Edward Reed (coach), American water polo coach
- Ed Reed (born 1978), American football player

== Others ==
- Edward Cornelius Reed Jr. (1924–2013), American federal judge
- Edward S. Reed (1954–1997), American ecological psychologist and philosopher
- Edward Tennyson Reed (1860–1933), British cartoonist
- T. Edward Reed, Canadian zoologist, anthropologist, and pediatrician

== See also ==
- Edward Rede (by 1476–1544), English politician
- Edward Reid (disambiguation)
- Ted Reed (1890–1959), American baseball player
