= Fred Reed =

Fred Reed or Frederick Reed may refer to:

- Fred A. Reed (1939–2024), American journalist, author and translator
- Fred Reed (footballer) (1894–1967), English football centre half
- F. R. Cowper Reed (1860–1946), English paleontologist and geologist
- Frederick M. Reed (1924–2012), American attorney and businessman

== See also ==
- Frederick Read, English organist and academic
- Frederick Read (cricketer), English cricketer
- Fred Reid (disambiguation)
