= Giuseppe Veltri =

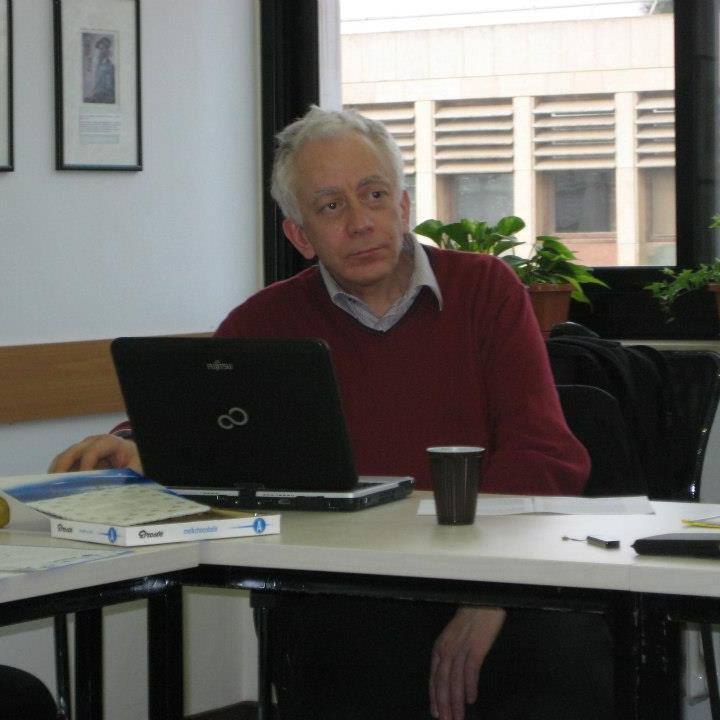
- Born: January 1, 1958 (age 68); San Giovanni in Fiore, Italy
- Known for: Founding the Institute for Jewish Philosophy and Religion; Director of Maimonides Centre for Advanced Studies; Research on Jewish Skepticism and Magic
- Awards: Emil Fackenheim Prize for Tolerance and Understanding (2010)

Academic background
- Education: Free University of Berlin (PhD, Habil.); Pontifical Biblical Institute; Pontifical Atheneum of St. Anselm
- Doctoral advisor: Peter Schäfer
- Other advisors: Roger Le Déaut, Carsten Colpe

Academic work
- Discipline: Jewish studies
- Sub-discipline: Jewish philosophy, Skepticism and Renaissance philosophy
- Institutions: Martin Luther University of Halle-Wittenberg; University of Hamburg

Giuseppe Veltri (born 1958) is professor of Jewish studies and philosophy. Born and graduated in Italy, he obtained his PhD (1991) and habilitation (1996) from the Free University of Berlin. From 1997 to 2014, he was professor of Jewish Studies at the Martin Luther University of Halle-Wittenberg. Since 2014, he is professor of Jewish philosophy and religion at the University of Hamburg and director of the Maimonides Centre for Advanced Studies as well as director of the Academy of World Religions in Hamburg since 2017.

== Career ==
Giuseppe Veltri was born in San Giovanni in Fiore, Calabria, Italy. From 1978 to 1983, he studied philosophy and theology in Siena and Viterbo. After obtaining his diploma at the Pontifical Atheneum of St. Anselm, he studied biblical criticism at the Pontifical Biblical Institute (1983–1986). In Rome, his mentor was the Targum researcher Roger Le Déaut.

In 1990, he moved to the Free University of Berlin, where he studied with the expert on Jewish studies and eminent scholar in comparative religion, Peter Schäfer and the religious historian and theologian Carsten Colpe. Both significantly influenced his development as a scholar.

From 1990 to 1996, he worked on the project Magic from the Cairo Geniza and the project Greek-Roman Religion in Palestine (financed by the German Research Foundation, and headed by Peter Schäfer). In 1991, he completed his PhD on the concept of translation in Jewish-Hellenistic and rabbinical contexts. He then obtained a habilitation in Jewish studies at the Free University of Berlin (1996). The topic of this habil. thesis, which is still cited today as an important study, is the connection between magic, law and the history of science.

Giuseppe Veltri was offered a professorship at the University of Halle-Wittenberg, where he was appointed Professor for Jewish studies in 1997.

In 2013, Giuseppe Veltri was offered the chair of Jewish religion and philosophy at Hamburg University. Since 2015, he is also director of the Maimonides Centre for Advanced Studies, a Centre founded by the German Research Foundation (DFG). He is also elected director of the Academy of World Religions AWR in Hamburg since 2017. One aim of the Academy is to promote interfaith dialogue between Judaism, Islam, Christianity, Buddhism, Hinduism and Alevism.

== Contributions to academia ==
In 1998, Veltri founded the now renowned Leopold Zunz Center at the Leucorea Foundation (Wittenberg) and has organised a large number of conferences, symposia and readings there. He took on the editorship of the Newsletter of the European Association for Jewish Studies (EAJS Newsletter), and has turned it into a respected, peer-reviewed periodical (European Journal of Jewish Studies), which is financed in part by the Rothschild Foundation and published by Brill. It is recognized by Thomson Reuters Indices as an ISI journal. In 2001, Veltri founded a successful scientific-scholarly series with Brill, the Studies in Jewish Culture and History, which has published 54 volumes to date.

In the 1990s and beyond, Veltri draw his efforts to the establishment of the field of Jewish Studies as an academic discipline in former Eastern Germany. Due to this endeavour, Jewish studies in Germany became an acknowledged faculty with its own distinctive profile (Jewish philosophy, religion and Middle Eastern Studies). Since Veltri's appointment as professor at Halle University, the Seminary of Jewish studies has developed from a virtually one person enterprise into an efficient and recognized institution.

From 2004 to 2012, Giuseppe Veltri was member of the scientific committee 106 of the German Research Foundation (DFG). From 2009 to 2019, he was chairman of the German Association for Jewish Studies.

In 2014 he was appointed professor of Jewish philosophy and religion at the University of Hamburg. He created the first Institute for Jewish Philosophy and Religion in Germany. His areas of research here are the Jewish philosophy of the Middle Ages, of the last scholastic and Humanist Jewish philosopher Obadiah ben Jacob Sforno and of the Jewish scepticism.

=== Research ===
Giuseppe Veltri's research interests focus on the religion of ancient Judaism, medieval philosophy, the culture and philosophy of the Renaissance and Early Modern Period, and the Science of Judaism. He successfully realised several research projects dedicated to these fields.

His doctoral dissertation on Jewish-Hellenistic and rabbinical conceptions of translation, as well as his habilitation thesis on magic, Jewish law and science have been recognized as ground-breaking in scope and depth for the study of the religion of ancient Judaism. The former was commended by the eminent Israeli scholar Emanuel Tov as a standard work on the topic, and the latter highly recognized by Hans Dieter Betz, a distinguished expert on the history of magic. Veltri's research on the subject was and is further extended and deepened through the DFG project Midrash Tehillim that realized the edition of the rabbinic Midrash to Psalms, as well as the DFG project Sprachauffassungen, that investigates the relation between the Biblical conception of language and rabbinical and medieval grammatical terminology.

In cooperation with scholars from Israel, France and the Netherlands, and through obtaining third party funding, Veltri could realize an important pilot project PESHAT (short for "Philosophic and Scientific Hebrew Terminology"), which is his key work in the area of Jewish philosophy. PESHAT is a long-term project that aims at the systematic study of the emergence and development of the philosophic and scientific terminology of premodern Hebrew in its cultural and historical context. An online multilingual thesaurus of medieval Hebrew philosophical and scientific terminology, already accessible via the project's homepage, is a 21st-century upgrade of and supplement to its printed predecessor, Jacob Klatzkin's Thesaurus philosophicus linguae hebraicae et veteris et recentioris, published in 5 volumes in Berlin in 1928–1933.

Much of his scholarly endeavour, Veltri devoted to the study of Renaissance philosophy and religious views. He translated and published the philosophical sermons of Judah Moscato and organized several conferences and symposia on the intellectual life of the Jews during the Early Modern period in Italy and elsewhere. A second project in this field is preparing the edition of the works of Simone Luzzatto.

The study of the Science of Judaism is associated with the name of Leopold Zunz, the founder of the "Wissenschaft des Judentums", who did his doctorate at the University of Halle and whose name is closely connected with the "Leopold Zunz Center for research on European Jewry" that Veltri founded at the University of Halle-Wittenberg. Veltri made the entire Jerusalem archive of Zunz available through cataloguing and digitalisation of more than 30,000 fols.

A further research area is Jewish skepticism and Jewish skeptics. Since 2015, Giuseppe Veltri has been director of the Maimonides Center for Advanced Studies (MCAS). This research centre is based on the assumption that scepticism is an essential aspect of the processes and categorizations within Jewish philosophy, religion, literature, and society in its permanent exchange with adjacent cultures. He understands scepticism as the enquiry of the ‘perpetual student’, who harbours doubts about different dimensions and systems of secular or revealed knowledge, calling authority as such into question. According to him, scepticism does not represent an intellectual or theoretical worldview, but rather an attitude that provides a basis for numerous and diverse phenomena. Hence, scepticism addresses fundamental processes and categorisations in Jewish philosophy, religion, literature, and society. More specifically, he applies the term scepticism to expressions of social deviance from, and conformity with, political structures, as well as to systems of governance, when they respond to and are in exchange with adjacent cultures. From the skepticism research developed Giuseppe Veltri a concept of tolerance, whose research today takes a focus of his work.

=== Honours and offered positions ===
Giuseppe Veltri held guest professorships at the University College London, the École des Hautes Études en Sciences Sociales (Paris), Sapienza University of Rome and the University of Bologna. In 2010, he was granted an honorary professorship for comparative religion at the University of Leipzig. In November 2010, the department of Jewish studies at the University of Halle-Wittenberg and Prof. Veltri as the head of department were granted the Emil Fackenheim Prize for Tolerance and Understanding awarded by the Jewish Community of Halle. The prize was for the first time awarded to an academic institute.

== Selected bibliography ==
- Discourse on the State of the Jews and in particular those dwelling in the illustrious city of Venice (1638), Simone Luzzatto, bilingual edition, edited, translated and commented together with Anna Lissa (Berlin, Boston: De Gruyter, 2019), ISBN 978-3-11-048733-6.
- Socrates or on Human knowledge. The Serious-Playful Exercise of Simone Luzzatto, Venetian Jews (1651), bilingual edition, edited, translated and commented together with Michela Torbidoni (Berlin, Boston: De Gruyter, 2018 or 2019).
- Alienated Wisdom. Enquiry into Jewish Philosophy and Scepticism (Berlin, New York: De Gruyter, 2018), ISBN 978-3-11-060449-8.
- Sapienza Alienata. La Filosofia Ebraica tra Mito, Storia e Scetticismo (Rome: Aracne, 2017), ISBN 978-88-255-0428-6.
- Yearbook of the Maimonides Centre for Advanced Studies, ed. together with Bill Riebiger (Boston: De Gruyter, 2016), ISBN 978-3-11-050172-8.
- Oltre le mura del ghetto. Accademie, scetticismo e tolleranza nella Venezia barocca. Studi e documenti d'archivio, together with Evelien Chayes (Palermo: New Digital Frontiers, 2016), ISBN 978-88-99487-48-5.
- Filosofo e rabbino nella Venezia del Seicento. Studi su Simone Luzzatto con documenti inediti dall'Archivio di Stato di Venezia (Rom: Aracne, 2015), ISBN 978-88-548-8423-6.
- A Mirror of Rabbinic Hermeneutics. Studies in Religion, Magic, and Language Theory in Ancient Judaism (Berlino: De Gruyter 2015), ISBN 978-3-11-036837-6.
- Simone Luzzatto. Scritti politici e filosofici di un ebreo scettico nella Venezia del Seicento, ed. together with Anna Lissa & Paola Ferruta (Milan: Bompiani, 2013), ISBN 978-88-452-7295-0.
- Language of Conformity and Dissent: On the Imaginative Grammar of Jewish Intellectuals in the Nineteenth and Twentieth Centuries (Academic Studies Press 2013), ISBN 978-1-61811-238-5.
- Scritti politici e filosofici di Simone Luzzatto, Rabbino e Filosofo nella Venezia del Seicento, ed. in cooperation with Paola Ferruta and Anna Lissa (Milan: Bompiani, 2013), ISBN 978-88-452-7295-0.
- Judah Moscato's Sermons. Volume One, Volume Two, and Volume Three, together with Gianfranco Miletto and Jehuda Halper (Leiden: Brill 2011–2013), ISBN 978-90-04-17900-4, ISBN 978-90-04-21932-8, and ISBN 978-90-04-26119-8.
- Rabbi Judah Moscato and the Jewish Intellectual World of Mantua in 16th–17th Century, ed. together with Gianfranco Miletto (Boston, Leiden: Brill 2012), ISBN 978-90-04-22225-0.
- Sprachbewusstsein und Sprachkonzepte im Alten Orient, Alten Testament und rabbinischen Judentum, ed. together with Johannes Thon and Ernst-Joachim Waschke (Halle: ZIRS 2012), ISSN 1617-2469.
- Studies in the History of Culture and Science. A Tribute to Gad Freudenthal, ed. together with Resianne Fontaine, Ruth Glasner, and Reimund Leicht (Boston, Leiden: Brill 2011), ISBN 978-90-04-19123-5.
- Renaissance Philosophy in Jewish Garb: Foundations and Challenges in Jewish Thought on the Eve of Modernity (Leiden, Boston: Brill 2009), ISBN 978-90-04-17196-1.
- The Jewish Body. Corporeality, Society, and Identity in the Renaissance and Early Modern Period, ed. together with Maria Diemling (Leiden, Boston: Brill 2009), ISBN 978-90-474-4209-7.
- Libraries, Translations, and 'Canonic' Texts. The Septuagint, Aquila, and Ben Sira in Jewish and Christian Tradition, Supplements to the Journal for the Study of Judaism 109 (Leiden, Boston: Brill 2006), ISBN 978-90-04-14993-9.
- Katholizismus und Judentum. Gemeinsamkeiten und Verwerfungen vom 16. bis zum 20. Jahrhundert, ed. together with Florian Schuller and Hubert Wolf (Regensburg: Pustet 2005), ISBN 3-7917-1955-6.
- Gottes Sprache in der philologischen Werkstatt. Hebraistik vom 15. bis 19. Jahrhundert, ed. together with Gerold Necker (Leiden: Brill 2004), ISBN 90-04-14312-2.
- Cultural Intermediaries: Jewish Intellectuals in Early Modern Italy, together with David Ruderman (Philadelphia: Univ. of Pennsylvania Press 2004), ISBN 0-8122-3779-X.
- Jewish Studies Between the Disciplines: Papers in Honor of Peter Schäfer on the Occasion of His 60th Birthday, together with Klaus Herrmann and Margarete Schlüter (Leiden: Brill 2003), ISBN 90-04-13565-0.
- An der Schwelle zur Moderne. Juden in der Renaissance, ed. together with Annette Winkelmann (Leiden: Brill 2003), ISBN 90-04-12979-0.
- Gegenwart der Tradition. Studien zur jüdischen Literatur und Kulturgeschichte, Supplements to the Journal for the Study of Judaism 69 (Leiden, Boston, Köln: Brill 2002), ISBN 978-90-04-11686-3.
- Magie und Halakha. Ansätze zu einem empirischen Wissenschaftsbegriff im spätantiken und frühmittelalterlichen Judentum, Texte und Studien zum antiken Judentum 62 (Tübingen: Mohr 1997), ISBN 3-16-146671-3.
- Eine Tora für den König Talmai. Untersuchungen zum Übersetzungsverständnis in der jüdisch-hellenistischen und rabbinischen Literatur, Texte und Studien zum Antiken Judentum 41 (Tübingen: Mohr 1994), ISBN 978-3-16-145998-6.
