= Steve Reid (disambiguation) =

Steve Reid (born 1944) is an American jazz drummer.

Steve Reid may also refer to:

- Steve Reid (video game producer), American video game producer
- Steve Reid (golfer) (born 1936), American former PGA Tour player
- Steve Reid (American football) (1914–2009), American football player
- Steve Reid (The Rippingtons), American jazz drummer, best known as a founding member of The Rippingtons
- Steve Reid (soccer) (born 1955), American soccer player

== See also ==
- Steven Reid (born 1981), Irish football player
- Steven J. Reid, Scottish historian
- Steven Reid (harness racer), driver of standardbred racehorses in New Zealand
- Stephen Reid (disambiguation)
- Steve Reed (disambiguation)
