= Mark Read =

Mark Read may refer to:

- Mark Read (bookmaker), Australian bookmaker of the 1980s
- Mark Read (singer) (born 1978), British singer/songwriter, member of the boy band a1
- Mark "Chopper" Read (1954–2013) Australian celebrity criminal

== See also ==
- Mark Reid (born 1961), retired Scottish footballer
- Mark Reed (disambiguation)
