= Annette Yoshiko Reed =

Religious studies academic

Annette Yoshiko Reed (born 1973) is an American religious historian. She holds the Krister Stendahl Chair at Harvard Divinity School. Reed's research interests span the topics of Second Temple Judaism, early Christianity, and Jewish/Christian relations in Late Antiquity, with particular attention to retheorizing religion, identity, difference, and forgetting. She is the daughter of political scientist Steven Reed and his wife Michiko Konishi.

== Career ==
Reed began her teaching career in the Department of Religious Studies at McMaster University (2003–2007) before moving to the Department of Religious Studies at the University of Pennsylvania (2007–2017). During her time at the University of Pennsylvania, she served as coordinator of the Philadelphia Seminar on Christian Origins as well as Director of the Center for Ancient Studies. She has held multiple fellowships at the Katz Center for Advanced Judaic Studies. In 2017, she joined the faculty of the Skirball Department of Hebrew and Judaic Studies and Department of Religious Studies at NYU. In July 2021, she joined Harvard University's Divinity School.

== Personal life ==
In addition to her scholarship, she is a certified kettlebell instructor and Muay Thai fighter, who won the American Thai Boxing Association (TBA) championship in her age/weight division in 2023. In an interview, she credited training and fighting with improving her university teaching. She has spoken on women and boxing in an event with poet Raisa Tolchinsky.

Reed is a member of the editorial board of the book series Texts and Studies in Ancient Judaism (TSAJ). In 2018, she delivered the Taubman Lecture Series at the University of California, Berkeley. Her 2020 monograph, Demons, Angels, and Writing in Ancient Judaism, was a finalist for the Jewish Book Council's Nahum M. Sarna Memorial Award. In 2020, she was awarded an American Council of Learned Societies fellowship for her project, "Forgetting: Retheorizing the Ancient Jewish Past and its Jewish and Christian Reception."

Reed has written for Salon, Religion Dispatches, and The Immanent Frame. She has also spoken about her work at the Franklin Institute. Reed is a fellow of the American Academy of Jewish Research.

== Select works ==
=== Publications ===
- Demons, Angels, and Writing in Ancient Judaism. Cambridge: Cambridge University Press, 2020. ISBN 9780521119436
- Enoch from Antiquity to the Middle Ages (with John Reeves). Oxford: Oxford University, 2018. ISBN 9780198718413
- Jewish-Christianity and the History of Judaism: Collected Essays. TSAJ 171. Tübingen: Mohr Siebeck, 2018. ISBN 9783161544767 Paperback reprint: Fortress, 2022.
- Fallen Angels and the History of Judaism and Christianity: The Reception of Enochic Literature. Cambridge: Cambridge University Press, 2005. ISBN 9780521853781

=== Edited volumes ===
- Envisioning Judaism: Essays in Honor of Peter Schäfer on the Occasion of his Seventieth Birthday. Edited with Ra’anan S. Boustan, Klaus Herrmann, Reimund Leicht, and Giuseppe Veltri, with the collaboration of Alex Ramos. 2 vols. Tübingen: Mohr Siebeck, 2013
- Jews, Christians, and the Roman Empire: The Poetics of Power in Late Antiquity. Edited with Natalie B. Dohrmann. Jewish Culture and Contexts. Philadelphia: University of Pennsylvania Press, 2013. ISBN 9780812245332
- Blood and the Boundaries of Jewish and Christian Identities in Late Antiquity. Edited with Raʻanan S. Boustan. Henoch 30.2 (2008). ISBN 9788837222741
- Heavenly Realms and Earthly Realities in Late Antique Religions. Edited with Raʻanan S. Boustan. Cambridge: Cambridge University Press, 2004. ISBN 9780521121774
- The Ways that Never Parted: Jews and Christians in Late Antiquity and the Early Middle Ages. Edited with Adam H. Becker. TSAJ 95. Tübingen: Mohr Siebeck, 2003. Paperback reprint: Fortress, 2005. ISBN 9780800662097
