= Steve Reed =

Steve, Steven or Stephen Reed may refer to:

- Steve Reed (baseball) (born 1965), American baseball player
- Steve Reed (footballer, born 1956), English footballer
- Steve Reed (politician) (born 1963), British politician
- Steve Reed (soccer executive) (fl. 1980–2020), president of the Canadian Soccer Association
- Stephen Reed (physician) (1801–1877), American newspaper publisher and geologist
- Stephen Reed (footballer) (born 1985), English footballer
- Stephen R. Reed (1949–2020), American politician
- Steven Reed (mayor) (born 1973/74), American politician
- Steven Reed (political scientist) (born 1947), American political scientist

== See also ==
- Steve Reid (disambiguation)
