= Julia Reed =

Julia Reed may refer to:

- Julia Reed (television presenter), British television presenter
- Julia Reed (politician), member of the Washington House of Representatives
- Julia Evans Reed, American author, journalist, columnist, speaker, and socialite
- Julia Reed (political operative), personal secretary to U.S. president Joe Biden
- Julia Scott Reed (1917–2004), American journalist, editor and radio broadcaster

== See also ==
- Julie Reed, historian of Native American history
- Julia Reid, British politician
