= Frank Reid =

Frank Reid may refer to:

- Frank R. Reid (1879–1945), Illinois politician
- Frank Reid (footballer) (1920–1970), Scottish footballer
- Frank H. Reid (1850–1898), American soldier, teacher, city engineer and vigilante
- Frank Reid (Canadian football) (born c. 1946), Canadian football player and politician

== See also ==
- Francis Reid (1900–1970), British Army officer
- Frank Reed (disambiguation)
- Frank Reade, fictional character
- Frank Read, British physicist
