= Fred Reid (disambiguation) =

Fred Reid may refer to:

- Fred Reid (born 1982), American gridiron football player and coach
- Fred Reid (athlete) (1909–1991), British sprinter
- Fred Reid (campaigner) (1937–2025), Scottish blind campaigner

== See also ==
- Fred Reed (disambiguation)
