= Eber Pettit =

American train conductor and abolitionist (1802–1885)

Eber Moffat Pettit (May 5, 1802 – May 13, 1885) was an American abolitionist. He played a role as a conductor on the Underground Railway.

== Biography ==
Pettit was born on May 5, 1802, in Pompey, New York, the son of James Pettit (1777–1849) and Lucy W. Felt. He and his family became active in the Underground Railroad in the 1830s, in both Fredonia and Versailles. He transported escaped slaves from his father's house in Fredonia to safe houses around Cordova and Versailles.

In 1868, Pettit documented his work in the Fredonia Censor newspaper before compiling his records into a book, titled Sketches in the History of the Underground Railroad in 1879.

Pettit died on May 13, 1885, aged 83, in Fredonia, New York. He was a cousin of journalist David E. Reed.
