= Edward Reid =

Edward Reid may refer to:

- Edward Reid (bishop) (1871–1938), Scottish Anglican bishop
- Sir Edward Reid, 2nd Baronet (1901–1972), British merchant banker
- Edward Waymouth Reid (1862–1948), British physiologist
- Edward Whitehead Reid (1883–1930), British general practitioner and surgeon
- Ed Reid, author and investigative journalist

== See also ==
- Edward Reed (disambiguation)
