= Maurice Read =

English cricketer (1859–1929)

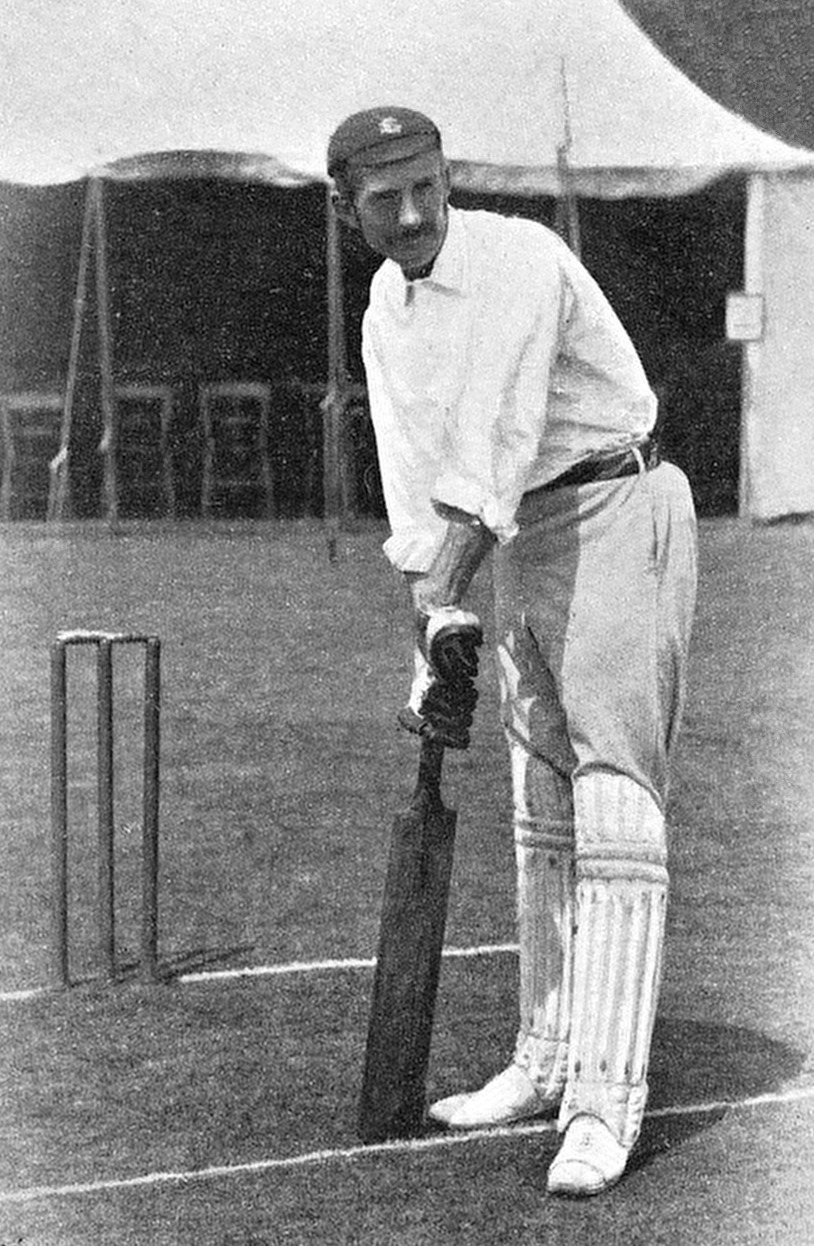
- Maurice Read

Personal information
- Born: 9 February 1859; Thames Ditton, Surrey, England
- Died: 17 February 1929 (aged 70); Winchester, Hampshire, England
- Batting: Right-handed
- Bowling: Right-arm fast-medium

International information
- National side: England
- Test debut (cap 36): 28 August 1882 v Australia
- Last Test: 19 July 1893 v Australia

Career statistics
Competition	Test	First-class
Matches	17	380
Runs scored	461	14,008
Batting average	17.07	24.66
100s/50s	0/2	11/70
Top score	57	186*
Balls bowled	–	3,911
Wickets	–	73
Bowling average	–	24.75
5 wickets in innings	–	1
10 wickets in match	–	0
Best bowling	–	6/41
Catches/stumpings	8/–	214/–
- Source: CricketArchive, 10 May 2023

John Maurice Read (9 February 1859 – 17 February 1929) was an English professional cricketer. Harry Altham wrote of him in A History of Cricket, "Maurice Read had been recognised as a dashing player up to Test match form, to say nothing of being a wonderful fielder in the country." A hard-hitting and, according to Lord Hawke, "magnificent batsman who never had pretensions to be even a moderate change bowler", Read did little bowling except in 1883, when he claimed 27 first-class wickets including his career best of 6/41 against Kent.

Born in 1859 in Thames Ditton, Surrey, Read joined the Thames Ditton Cricket Club in 1879, made his first-class debut for Surrey in 1880, and played regularly for his county for fifteen years. His most productive year was 1886, when he scored 1,364 runs at an average of 34.97, including two centuries and seven fifties. He was also extremely productive in the first half of 1889, and was a Wisden Cricketer of the Year in 1890, but his season was affected later in the year by a bad finger injury.

== Test debut and career ==
Read made his debut in the Oval (his home ground) Test match against Australia in 1882, the match famous for bringing about the Ashes. According to the Manchester Guardian, Read's selection "was admittedly something of an experiment. He has played two or three lucky innings lately, but these do not make a cricketer any more than two or three swallows make a summer." A week or so prior the Test, however, Read had shared in a 158-run partnership against the tourists with fellow professional and England player Billy Barnes. Read finished on 130 and, like most of his team-mates, went into the match in good form.

In England's first innings, the local boy was cheered all the way to the middle by an avid Oval crowd. Fred Spofforth, however, soon walloped the hero three excruciating blows – one in the ribs, another on the knee and one more on the elbow. Read was compelled to hold up the game on two of these occasions to take time to convalesce, and it was, by all reports, an exceptionally valiant knock. Read finished unbeaten on nineteen, the second-best score of the innings, and the masses cheered him all the way back to the pavilion. There are copious examples in this match which serve to support Altham's affirmation that Read was "a wonderful fielder in the country" (i.e. outfield). He is frequently recorded in contemporary accounts of the game as chasing the ball down as fast as he could, and he certainly managed to bring to a halt plenty of potential Australian boundaries.

In the second innings, Read was one of the many victims of England captain Monkey Hornby's spectacular alteration of the batting order, promoted in front of the apparently nerveless CT Studd. When he came into view from the pavilion, Read was again cheered stridently all the way to the wicket, but, when Spofforth bowled him for a duck, the Australians were the ones, wrote Charles Pardon in Bell's Life, who "exhibited to the full their increasing delight". This was the game which launched the legend of The Ashes after the Australians won by seven runs.

When he came back to Australia in 1886/87, Read was flabbergasted at the pickiness of the Australian public, and he wrote of it: "If you have a bit of bad luck and make nothing two or three times, you are not of much account in Australia, and out of the team you should go, even if you have scored excellently on occasions." In England, however, it was different. "There," he reckoned, "if you are a recognised player, half a dozen successive noughts will not exclude you from a team."

Read remained a regular selection for England until 1893, being awarded that year's Oval Test (against South Africa) as a benefit. Although his batting at this level was not spectacular – he passed fifty only twice in his 29 Test innings – his fielding at third man was excellent. He also appeared for the Players against the Gentlemen on 17 occasions.

== Read and Lohmann ==
George Lohmann, for one, preferred watching Read (and even AE Stoddart) to Arthur Shrewsbury, the man whom WG Grace placed second only to himself. Indeed, Read and Lohmann were extremely good friends, and they even shared a few personal jokes. ("Look out!" Lohmann would say to Read; "I'm going to bowl at the sticks now!"—and Read would watch with amusement as his comrade sent down all manner of strange deliveries to tempt the batsman into hitting out.)

Read was sent along to South Africa with Lohmann in 1892 to be of assistance to the great bowler in his recuperation following a ghastly (but altogether foreseeable) physical collapse as a result of overbowling. The pair sailed from Southampton on Christmas Eve, and, in March 1893, when Lohmann was healthy enough to be left on his own, Read made his homecoming for the start of the new season. (Lohmann later broke down again, however, eventually dying in South Africa.)

Incidentally, another colleague of Read's who suffered the effects of being overbowled was Tom Richardson, a Surrey and Thames Ditton team-mate. Read was one of the first to forecast what would eventually happen to this great fast bowler, conjecturing ominously about the strenuous effects that the 1897/98 tour might have on Richardson's body. He was, of course, proven correct.

== Career's end ==
After scoring 131 to help Surrey defeat Hampshire by an innings in 1895, Read retired from first-class cricket at the age of 36 – relatively young by 19th century standards – to work on the Tichborne Park estate in Hampshire, although he continued to bat with great success in minor cricket for the Tichborne side for some years thereafter, scoring hundreds in successive weekends in 1921 (v Martyn Worthey and Kilmeston) He died at the age of 70 in Winchester after a long illness. George Giffen called him "one of the most genuine cricketers I met".

Read's uncle (by marriage) Heathfield Stephenson had a long career with Surrey, and his brother Frederick Read also played one first-class game for the county. Read died at Winchester in 1929.
