= Mark Reed =

Mark Reed may refer to:

- Mark Reed (academic), President of St. Joseph's University
- Mark Reed (Arizona Wildcats), American football quarterback
- Mark Reed (quarterback, born 1959), American football quarterback
- Mark Reed (baseball) (born 1986), catcher for the Arizona Diamondbacks
- Mark Reed (figure skater), British ice dancer
- Mark Reed (physicist) (1955–2021), American physicist
- Mark Reed (racing driver) (born 1969), American racing driver
- Mark Reed (sculptor) (born 1971), British sculptor
- Mark E. Reed (1866–1933), American politician in the state of Washington

== See also ==
- Mark Read (disambiguation)
- Mark Reeds (1960–2015), ice hockey player
