= Julie Reed =

American historian

Julie L. Reed
- Occupations: Associate Professor of History and Anthropology

Academic background
- Education: B.A. in English literature, University of South Florida (1998); M.T.S. in theological studies, Perkins School of Theology, Southern Methodist University (2000); M.A. in American history, University of North Carolina at Chapel Hill (2008); Ph.D. in American history, University of North Carolina at Chapel Hill (2011)
- Thesis: 'A Nation's Charge: Cherokee Social Services, 1835–1907'
- Doctoral advisor: Theda Perdue and Michael D. Green

Academic work
- Discipline: Native American history

Julie L. Reed is a historian of Native American history, with an emphasis on Southeastern Indians and Cherokee history, as well as American education. She is currently an associate professor of History and Anthropology at University of Tulsa. She is also a member of the Cherokee Nation and has focused her research mainly on Cherokee Nation history and Cherokee education.

== Education ==
Reed received her bachelor's degree in English Literature at the University of South Florida in 1998. In 2000, she received a Master's degree in Theological Studies at Perkins School of Theology. Then, she continued with a Master of Arts degree in American History at UNC-Chapel Hill, which she received in 2008 with a thesis on “Family and Nation, Cherokee Orphan Care, 1835-1903." In 2011, Reed finished her studies with a PhD in American History at UNC-Chapel Hill with a dissertation on “A Nation’s Charge: Cherokee Social Services, 1835-1907."

== Academic career ==
Reed's academic career began at the University of Tennessee, Knoxville, where she worked as an assistant professor of American Indian and United States history from 2011 to 2017. From 2017 to 2019, Reed taught as an associate professor of American Indian and United States history.

Reed next worked as an associate professor of American Indian and American history at Penn State University (2019-2025). In June 2025, Reed was hired to work at the University of Tulsa.

== Research ==
Reed published her first book, titled "Serving the Nation: Cherokee Sovereignty and Social Welfare, 1800-1907," in 2016. In this book, she discusses the system of social welfare policies implemented by the Cherokee Nation, focusing in particular on the ethic of gadugi and some other main principles of the Cherokee nation, including martilineal descent, egalitarian relations, kinship obligations and communal landholding. This system is analyzed in connection to U.S. government's social policies as well as a development of its own.

The time frame of this book is the 19th century, therefore some of the main points in this period include the departure from the traditional matrilinear social policies, the role of missionaries and the aim to connect Cherokee traditions to U.S. institutions.

Reed also discusses the implications of the Civil War and Reconstruction period on the Cherokee nation and implementation of the nation's own institutions. The consequences of allotment are explained and analyzed.

Reed's second book, Land, Language, and Women: A Cherokee and American Educational History, was published by the University of North Carolina Press in 2026. It examines four centuries of Cherokee education from archaeological, archival, and personal evidence.

Reed is also working on another book titled "Sovereign Kin: A History of the Cherokee Nation" together with Rose Stremlau, an associate professor in History at Davidson College in Davidson, North Carolina. This project received a grant from the National Endowment for the Humanities and will be about the history of the Cherokee nation from before 1600 up to 2010.

== Selected works ==
- Serving the Nation: Cherokee Sovereignty and Social Welfare, 1800-1907 (Norman: University of Oklahoma Press, April 2016)
- “’An Absolute and Unconditional Pardon’: Nineteenth Century Cherokee Indigenous Justice.” In Legacies: Essays on the Native South, edited by Greg O’Brien and Tim Garrison (Lincoln: University of Nebraska Press, 2017): 126-143.
- “Whose Stories Get Told,” In Marked, Unmarked, Remembered: A Photographic Geography of American Historical Memory, edited by Alex Lichtenstein and Andrew Lichtenstein, (Morgantown: West Virginia Press, forthcoming).
- Carroll, B., A. Cressler, T. Belt, M. White, W. Adams, J. Reed, and J. Simek, “The Red Bird River Shelter (15cy52) Revisited: The Archaeology of Cherokee Syllabary and of Sequoyah in Kentucky” (Forthcoming April 2019, American Antiquity)
- Carroll, B., A. Cressler, T. Belt, J. Reed, and J. Simek, “Talking stones: Cherokee syllabary in Manitou Cave, Alabama.” (Forthcoming April 2019, Antiquity)

== Community engagement ==
Reed is active in presenting contextual knowledge of the Cherokee nation to non-native citizens. She has given several interviews for different news publications. In 2017, Reed provided information on historical sites in the Southern Appalachia region for TIME. In 2018, the Las Vegas Review-Journal interviewed Reed in a story on a Native American exhibition opening.

Reed has also written several articles on Cherokee-related topics. She published an op-ed for New York Daily News on Elizabeth Warren's claims towards Native Americans in 2023. She also published a commentary for TribLive on a Cherokee nation delegate to the House of Representatives.

== Selected awards ==
- Frances C. Allen Fellowship, Newberry Library, 2009
- Phillips Fund Grant for Native American Research, American Philosophical Society, 2009
- David J. Weber Fellow for the Study of Southwestern America, William P. Clements Center, SMU, 2013-2014
- American Academy of Education/Spencer Small Research Grant, Spencer Foundation, 2018
