= Simone Luzzatto =

Italian rabbi

- Born: 1583
- Died: 6 January 1663 (aged 79–80)
- Occupation: Teacher, translator

Simone (Simcha) Luzzatto (Hebrew: שמחה לוצאטו) (1583–1663) was a prominent rabbi in the Jewish ghetto of Venice, Italy. He shared the rabbinate of Venice with another famous rabbi, Leone de Modena.

== Works ==
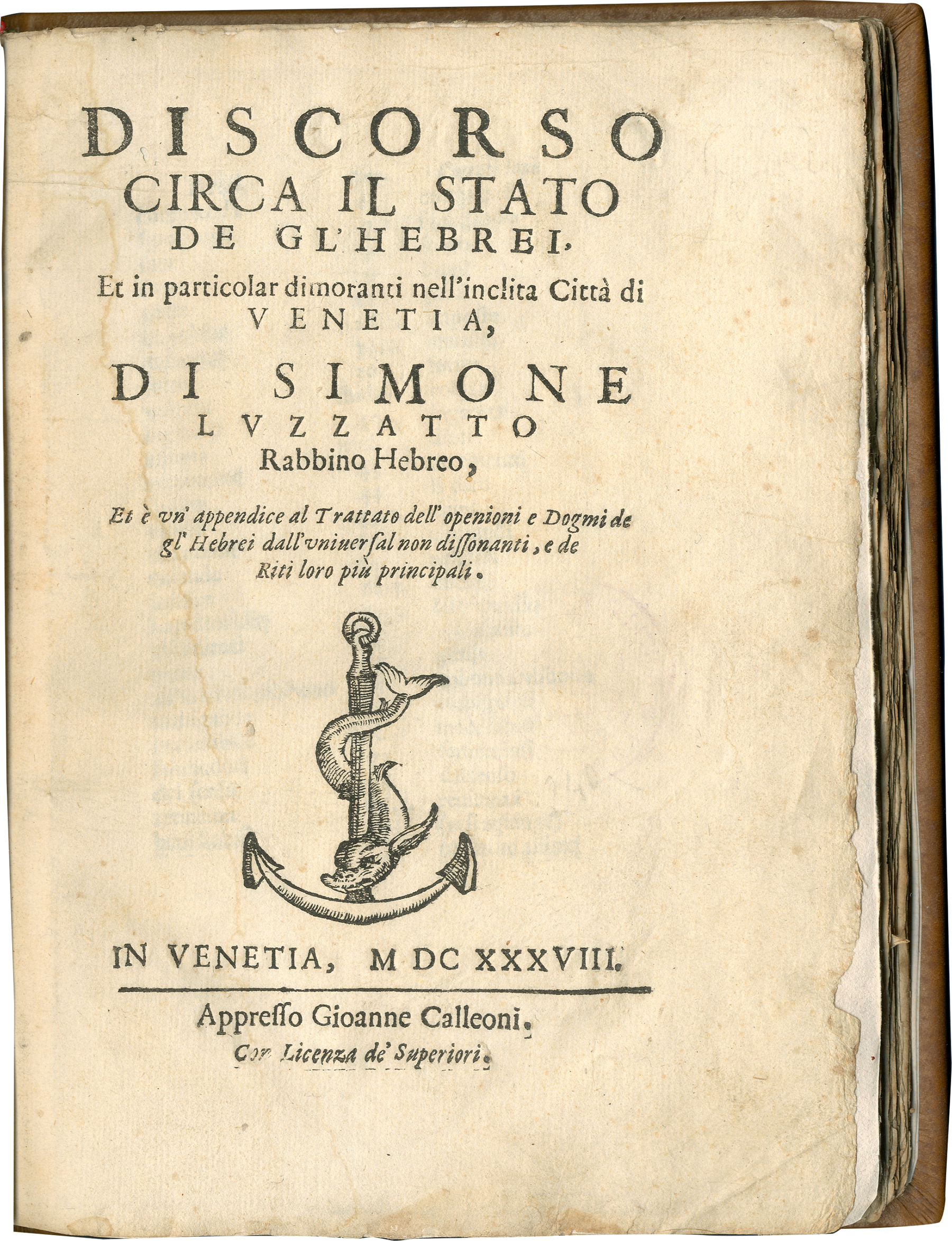
Discorso circa il stato de gl'Hebrei, Venice, 1638

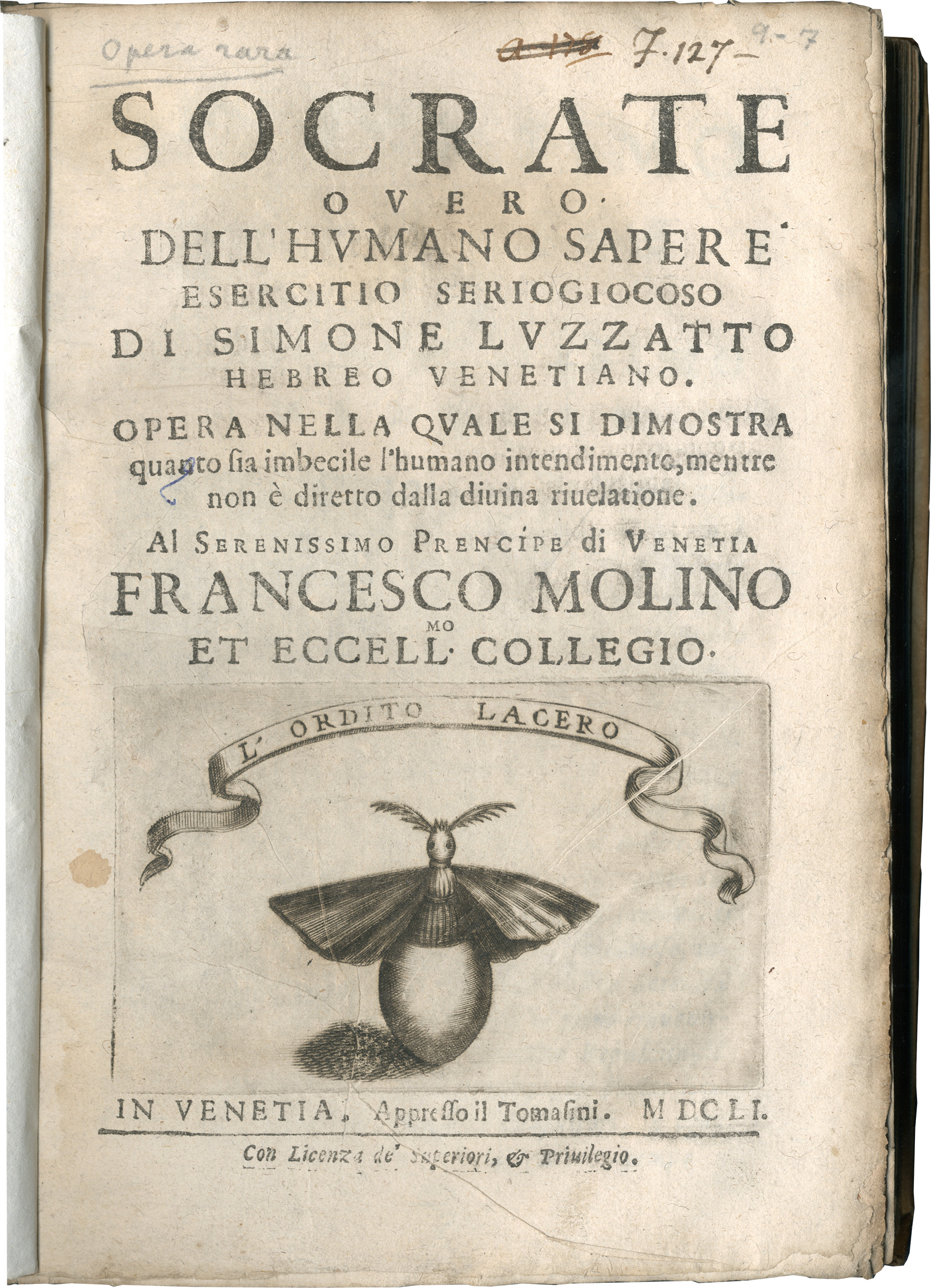
Socrate ouero Dell'humano sapere, Venice, 1651

Luzzatto was educated by some of the most outstanding rabbis of his period. By the age of 22, many of his works were being published and discussed throughout the Jewish community. These works, called responsa, gained him a good deal of popularity; including a rather interesting work that deemed it was acceptable to travel by gondola on Shabbat (a day during which travelling on water is normally forbidden to religious Jews).

Another of his important works written in Italian is entitled Socrate, which argues that human reason cannot attain its goals if unaided by divine revelation.

== Expulsion of Jews ==
During this period there were a great many Jews who were being expelled from their homes throughout Italy (and, indeed, the rest of Europe). Fearing the same fate might befall Venetian Jewry, Luzzatto took preemptive action, writing a pamphlet in classical Socratic style which presented clear and rational arguments against such an expulsion taking place in Venice.

=== Discourse ===
The resulting work, entitled Discorso circa il stato de gl'Hebrei et in particolar dimoranti nell'inclita città di Venetia ("Discourse Concerning the Condition of the Jews, and in particular those living in the Fair City of Venice"), was completed in 1638. The discourse broke from tradition in that it was not directly addressed to Venetian Jewry or the official rabbinate of the time, but to the leaders of the Venetian Republic (called the doge, amongst others). Luzzatto argued for toleration of the Jews on the basis of their economic and social usefulness. He stated that Jews performed tasks which would normally be taken on by foreign merchants, but could instead remain under control of the republic.

Further breaking from tradition, the discourse was not written in Hebrew, but rather in eloquent Italian. As a result, the discourse was successful in convincing the Doge to rule against the expulsion edict, allowing the Jewish population of Venice to remain.
