= David William Lister Read =

David William Lister Read (23 April 1922 – 2 July 2015) was an author of autobiographical works which reveal a profound knowledge of Maasai history. He lived the life of a "white Maasai" and could speak their language before his own native English. Born in Nairobi, Read spent his formative years in what is now Tanzania, a country to which he would always return. Read spent his final years in Momella near Arusha in northern Tanzania, where he continued to work on his writing until his death.

== Biography ==
Read was born to British parents in Kenya, on 23 April 1922 according to the author's website, and in 1921 according to the biographical note in Waters of the Sanjan. Left on her own with young David, his mother eventually sought a living in Maasailand when Read was seven, there she ran a small hotel and traded with the Maasai. Read spent his next seven years of childhood here, during which time his playmates were the Maasai children. Maasai became his first language, followed by Swahili before English, and he ran wild with his friends learning a lot about the Maasai way of life and associating closely with nature and the wildlife. Totally accepted as a Maasai by the tribe, he took part in meat festivals and other tribal gatherings and ceremonies.

At the age of 14, Read was sent to school in Arusha. His schooling was completed by correspondence course, when he was employed as an apprentice Metallurgist by the Tanganyika Department of Geological Survey.

At the outbreak of the Second World War, he joined the Kenya Regiment and later trained with the Royal Air Force and served with the King's African Rifles in Abyssinia, Madagascar and Burma. After the War, he commanded the Uganda contingent in the Victory Parade in London and joined the Tanganyika Veterinary Department, where he spent the next six years. During this time, he covered areas that included parts of Maasailand when he was able to renew his former close association with that tribe.

Having eventually acquired a farm of his own on the slopes of Kilimanjaro, also in Maasailand, he went on to become a leading farming figure and prominent landowner in Tanganyika and was Chairman of the Tanganyika Farmers Association from 1973 to 1975. However, after Independence was granted to Tanganyika in 1961, his properties began to be gradually eroded, during which period he was employed part-time by the Anglo American Corporation in Zambia as an Agricultural Consultant. By 1975 the Tanzania Government had acquired the last of his properties and he left Tanzania for Zambia, and then South Africa, where he again tried his hand at farming, an interlude in his life that proved far from happy or satisfactory. Finally in 1979 he returned to Kenya to join Lima Limited as their Agricultural Consultant.

Read was married and had one daughter. He was a leading authority on the people of Eastern Africa, speaking several African dialects, but it was with the Maasai that he spent his formative years, and with whom he is most closely associated with.

== Bibliography ==
=== Barefoot over the Serengeti ===
The book covers Read's adventures between seven and fourteen years in the Serengeti, homeland of the Maasai, whose customs and lifestyle he reports, as seen through the eyes of a child. Jonathan Taylor writes: "I learnt more about the Masai by reading Barefoot Over the Serengeti than I have from any of the countless scholarly anthropology tomes of colourful coffee table books written about them".

=== Beating about the Bush ===
This is Read's second autobiographical novel, covering the period between 1936 and 1952 Beating about the Bush picks up Read's story where "Barefoot" left off, with his parents moving to the Lupa Goldfields to try to salvage their livelihoods after a catastrophic series of events that left them almost destitute, reliant on Read's hunting skills and the help of their Maasai friends. The book moves from Mission School life to veterinary training, active service in Abyssinia, Madagascar, Burma, and India, meetings with the King and Queen to privileged encounters with the hunter-gatherers of the Okiek people or, in Maasai language, Ndorobo people. During six years employment by the Tanganyika Veterinary Department in Dodoma he roamed the African savannas of his childhood, investigating ritual tribal killings and working as a livestock marketing officer.

Like in his other works it is obvious that it is the people rather than the events that Read's narrative lays emphasis on.

=== Another Load of Bull ===
After the work for the Veterinary Department the Reads settled as wheat farmers on the Western slopes of Kilimanjaro. With no formal training, Read survived largely on his local knowledge and language skills, supplemented by his cattle buying. Life on 'Mountainside' suited Read, despite the constant battles against Africa's unforgiving environment, but the winds of change were to bring a greater challenge and one that would ultimately end Read's dreams.

=== Waters of the Sanjan ===
This is Read's sole fiction novel, again situated in the Serengeti at the turn from the nineteenth to the twentieth century. In a series of adventures the protagonist Dangoya develops his reputation and leadership of his age-group and has to deal with envy, drought, superstition and colonialists. Dangoya proves to be an enlightened leader, respecting his tribe's traditions and his elders but at the same time challenging incompetence and mere superstition. – In a concentrated form the book encloses Maasai tradition such as male and female circumcision, cattle raids, blood drinking, alcohol drinking, meat feasts, sexual habits like polygamy, initiation ceremonies, etc.

In his foreword Ole Ntekerei Memusi writes: “Waters of the Sanjan is an accurate and admirable historic record of my people". (p. xi)

== Relevance ==
Read's works, covering a period of seven decades, not only describe a unique life starting from the adoption of the young boy by the magnificent Maasai tribe whose influence never ceased through his adolescence and manhood; it is also an ethnographic document of a native African group, who rely on oral tradition and whose knowledge and history is, by the accuracy and the empathy which characterise Read's novels, preserved from amnesia.

== Sources ==
- David Read, Barefoot over the Serengeti, privately published by David Read, Nairobi 1979, 2nd ed. 1980 by Travel Book Club. Reprint 1984, ISBN 9987-8920-2-7 and ISBN 0-304-30057-8
- David Read and Pamela Brown, Waters of the Sanjan. A Historical Novel of the Masai, privately published by David Read 1982, revised edition. 1989, ISBN 9987-8920-1-9
- David Read, Beating about the Bush. Tales from Tanganyika, privately published by David Read 2000, ISBN 9987-8920-3-5
- David Read, Another Load of Bull, privately published by David Read, ISBN 9987-8920-5-1
