= Mark Read (bookmaker) =

Australian businessman and former bookmaker

- Occupation: Businessman
- Known for: Founder of International All Sports

Mark Read is an Australian businessman and former bookmaker, founder of International All Sports.

Read was a leading bookmaker at a time when racing, particularly in Queensland, was beset with corruption, and avoided accepting bets from Queensland races. Read was one of the first bookmakers to sniff out the Fine Cotton substitution scam. At the height of his success in 1982, Read bought a mansion, Boomerang, Elizabeth Bay, but then retired. Sportsbet.com.au acquired International All Sports in 2009.
