= Ida Lilliard Reed =

American poet

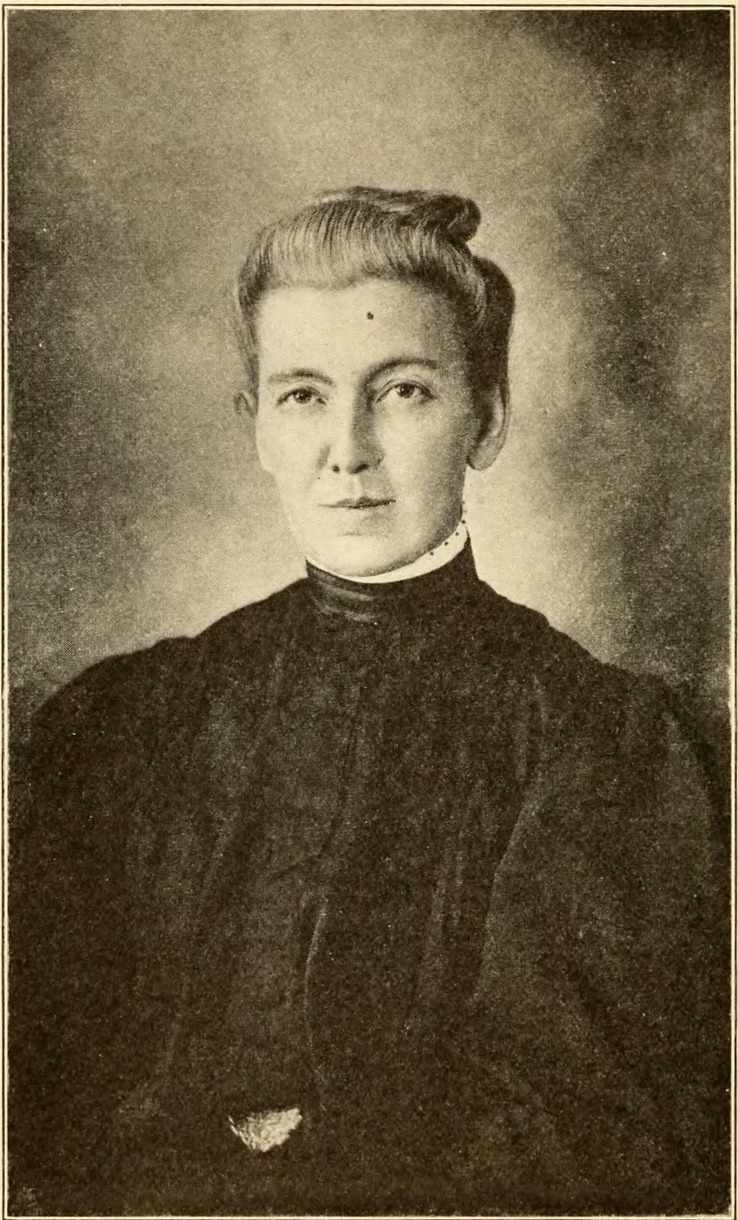
- Born: November 30, 1865
- Died: July 8, 1951 (aged 85)

Ida Lilliard Reed (November 30, 1865 – July 8, 1951) was an American religious writer and music composer from West Virginia.

== Biography ==
=== Early life ===
Ida L. Reed was born to James and Nancy J. (née Lelliardt) Reed on Rock Camp Run, near Philippi, WV, in Barbour County. Her family was of Scotch, English, and German heritage and originally settled in Virginia. One of eight children, Reed's childhood was fraught with illness, death, and poverty. She believed God divinely inspired her to write hymns.

=== Career ===
Reed composed cantatas, poems, and hymns, totaling over 2,000 works. Reed's works were taken up by several different Protestant denominations and translated into several languages. Her most popular hymn was "I Belong to the King" which was estimated by publishers Hall, Mack & Co. to have a circulation of four million copies. Hymns were regularly sold for $1 during her time, yet Reed received "top price of $2" for some of her work. In 1940, the American Society of Composers, Authors and Publishers recognized Reed's "substantial contribution to American music" by awarding her a weekly "bonus".

In addition to hymns and songs, she also wrote poems, children's stories, and books. Her autobiography My Life Story was published in 1912.

=== Death and legacy ===
Reed died at the age of 85 in 1951. She is buried at Ebenezer Methodist Church at Arden. Reed's family homestead near Arden, West Virginia was listed on the National Register of Historic Places until it was destroyed by fire in 1991.

== Notable hymns ==
- "I Belong to the King" (1896)
- "I Cannot Drift Beyond Thy Love" (1906)
- "Lift Thy Face to the Light!"
- "Somebody's Praying for You"
- "Steady, Brother, Steady" (c. 1913)

== Publications ==
- My Life Story (1912)
- The Story of a Song: What It Means to Belong to the King
- Songs of the Hills (1940)

== Additional sources ==
- Songs of the Hills (1940), Boston: Meador Publishing Company (an anthology of Reed's works)
