= Veltri =

Veltri is a surname. Notable people with the surname include:

- Elio Veltri (born 1938), Italian journalist and politician
- John Veltri (born 1938), American photographer
- Rachel Veltri (born 1978), American actress and model
- Richard D. Veltri (1936–2015), American engineer and politician
