= T. S. Reed =

Civil Servant of South Australia

Thomas Sadler Reed (22 May 1818 – 25 April 1914) was a Civil Servant in the British colony of South Australia, and a long-serving secretary of the State's branch of the Royal Geographical Society.

== History ==
Reed was born in Wellington Place, Bristol, the son of Charles Reed, wine and spirit merchant, and Elizabeth Reed, née Sadler, his second wife. After leaving school Reed was made a partner in the family business, which he took over in 1842 when his father retired. He married in 1844, then in 1848 moved to Derby, where he became involved in the silk industry. In 1851, he was awarded the Great Exhibition 'Council Medal' for his silk weaving machinery. Around 1860 he and his family moved to London, living in Kensington until 1866 when, seeking a healthier climate, he emigrated to Australia, arriving in Adelaide, where his wife's brother Richard D. Hanson was Chief Justice of the Supreme Court and an ex-Premier in November 1866.

After a few days in the Adelaide, Reed took a trip up north, where the climate proved so beneficial to his health that his lung problems vanished completely. On 3 February 1867, through the influence of Hanson, Reed was appointed chairman of the Destitute Board, a new position which had the effect of demoting the long-serving secretary Edward Holthouse, who thereby lost £80 from his salary. Well aware of the man's displeasure, and expecting disloyalty (denied by Holthouse), Reed had him dismissed.

In March 1866 Emily Clark wrote a "Letter to the Editor" titled "The Destitute Asylum" which was published in the Register (perhaps with a little assistance from her brother Howard, editor of that paper). She pointed out the evil effects of housing together large numbers of orphans and unwanted children in proximity to unhealthy and dispirited adults, and proposed a system of "boarding-out", where suitable married couples could look after such a child or several siblings. Clark and fellow-Unitarian Catherine Helen Spence founded the "Boarding-out Society" to put her ideas into operation, but received no support from government apart from granting permission to engage in trials. Neville Blyth organised for her to have responsibility for a boy and a girl who were unhappy in the institution, and put with a suitable family.

With public approval and encouraging results from a few trials, plus the prospect of a substantial saving of government money, "boarding-out" became official policy and was adopted by Reed, whose enthusiasm and dedication to its success was welcomed by Clark. Reed was made a Justice of the Peace in April 1872. By 1873 the organization of the scheme had been put on a firm foundation. In twelve years of operation, boarding-out saved the SA government between £30,000 and £40,000.

Reed's health deteriorated, attributed to overwork, and on 1 March 1876 he was granted a year's leave on full pay, and returned to England, where a year later he resigned. In accepting his resignation, under-secretary Boothby commiserated with Reed on his state of health, and congratulated him on the success of the boarding-out system. At the end of 1878 Reed returned to Adelaide. Judah Moss Solomon, who had been appointed chairman in his place, died on 29 August 1880 and on 15 October Reed was reappointed to the position.

The creation in 1886 of the State Children's Council removed much of the Destitution Board's responsibilities. In 1888 a Commission, led by S. D. Glyde and consisting of H. E. Bright, David Bews, R. Homburg, W. E. Longbottom and A. L. Harrold, was charged with reporting on the efficiency of the Civil Service. Its greatest criticisms were reserved for the police force; one measure recommended being to charge for police attendance at football matches etc. Another was the abolition of Reed's post, and radical changes to the administration of the department. Government adoption of the Commission's recommendations without listening to the Board led to the resignation of Reed and all five members, the board of the State Children's Council having similarly protested a few weeks earlier. This was particularly unfortunate, as its members (which included the intelligent and devoted philanthropists C. E. Clark, C. H. Spence, K. Howard, B. A. Baker and Lady Davenport) had made a vocation of their membership, but The Observer also regretted Reed's departure.

Reed subsequently devoted himself to the South Australian branch of the Royal Geographical Society, serving as its secretary 1903–1914, and did much to further its aims.

In 1913 he was knocked down by a horse and cab in front of The Advertiser offices and sustained a fractured collarbone. He made a surprisingly rapid recovery, but a few weeks later he was knocked down by a railway engine in front of the Victoria Square station, but was not injured. Shortly afterwards he visited Sydney and Melbourne in his capacity as an officer of the Geographical Society. He died at Torrensville and was buried at the West Terrace Cemetery.

== Tributes ==
"Mr. Reed . . . was a wonderful old English gentleman, possessing great ability and a remarkable capacity for work . . . His memory was remarkably retentive, and he was particularly accurate about dates, even as far back as 80 years ago. We all deplore his death." J. Lewis (president of the Society)

"Reed . . . one of the most lovable as well as the most diligent of men. He was already 92 years of age when I became president, and throughout my term of office he showed for his work an industry and enthusiasm that would have been creditable in a man with his career still to make. With all this he had a vigorous joy in life, and a kindly and sympathetic nature. I confess myself to have been refreshed many a time by his brightness and activity." A. W. Piper, K.C.

== Publications ==
- Reed, T. S; Reed, George Lancelot 1845-1917 (October 1896), Memories of a long life / by Thomas S. Reed, W. K. Thomas & Co. originally published March – September 1896 in serial form in The Evening Journal; includes his account of the Bristol riots of October 1831
- Further Memories of a Long Life published September – October 1901 in serial form in The Evening Journal.

== Personal ==
Reed married Ellen Hanson ( – 9 December 1890) on 8 August 1844. She was a sister of Sir Richard D. Hanson, Chief Justice of South Australia from 1861 to 1875. Their three sons included:

- eldest son Hanson Reed (died 9 September 1890)
- Walter Douglas Reed (c. 1854 – 30 September 1946), of Reed & Dumel, land agents and sharebrokers. He was a fine singer, a member of the Adelaide Philharmonic Society, and a close friend of Cecil Sharp. He married Emily Jane "Emmie" Clindening c. 1890, lived at Grange, then Fairford Street, North Unley. Emmie was daughter of Dr William Talbot Clindening (c. 1824–1899), medical officer to the Destitute Board.
