= Steve Reid (video game producer) =

American video game producer

Steve Reid is an American video game producer, managing director of game developer Red Storm Entertainment. He serves on the Visual Arts Advisory Board of the Game Developers Conference. Next Generation Magazine listed Reid as #14 on its "Hot 100 Game Developers for 2007".

== Career ==
After earning a Master of Fine Arts degree from East Carolina University in Greenville, North Carolina, Reid entered the video game industry as art director at Virtus Studios before taking the same position at Virtual Reality Games. A founder of Red Storm, Reid began as Director of Creative Design. He became managing director in January, 2001. Reid, an advisor on digital art curricula to local and national colleges, has been a vocal proponent of "formal training relationships" between game industry companies and educational institutions, indicating at a roundtable discussion at the 2006 E3 Media and Business Summit his opinion that mentoring of that nature will prepare entry level industry employees "to work with the technology and processes of the game industry".

== Additional sources ==
- "Red Storm Entertainment Meet The Team"
- "Steve Reid" Allgame
- "Steven Reid" MobyGames
