= SS David C. Reid =

History
- Name: SS David C. Reid
- Owner: John Jay Shipping Co.
- Builder: Merchant Shipbuilding Corp
- Launched: 12 May 1918.
- Fate: Missing 14 October 1928

General characteristics
- Class & type: Tanker
- Tonnage: 5,700
- Displacement: 9,300
- Length: 400 feet
- Beam: 54 feet
- Depth: 31 feet
- Installed power: Two Westinghouse steam turbines
- Propulsion: Single Screw
- Speed: 10.5 knots
- Notes: Ordered as "Winterleaf" by the British Admiralty as a Royal Fleet Auxiliary, Taken over by the US and delivered as "Sliverbrook". Name changed to "David C. Reid in 1928.

SS David C. Reid was an American molasses tanker that sank on 14 October 1928. Her last known position was given in an SOS just west of the Azores.

== Memorial ==
The David C. Reid's radio operator, J. Maurice Black, is honored on the Wireless Operator's Monument in Battery Park, New York City. Strangely, the entry lists the location as "South Atlantic".

== Storm ==
The American Meteorological Society's Monthly Weather Review for October 1928 noted that David C. Reid was not far from a tropical storm at the time she disappeared.
