= Frederick Read (cricketer) =

English cricketer

Personal information
- Full name: Frederick Hurrell Read
- Born: 26 December 1855; Thames Ditton, Surrey, England
- Died: 4 May 1933 (aged 77); Hounslow, Middlesex, England
- Batting: Unknown
- Relatives: Maurice Read (brother); Heathfield Stephenson (uncle)

Domestic team information
- Years: Team
- 1881: Surrey

Career statistics
Competition	First-class
Matches	1
Runs scored	4
Batting average	4.00
100s/50s	–/–
Top score	4
Balls bowled	–
Wickets	–
Bowling average	–
5 wickets in innings	–
10 wickets in match	–
Best bowling	–
Catches/stumpings	–/–
- Source: Cricinfo, 24 June 2012

Frederick Hurrell Read (26 December 1855 – 4 May 1933) was an English cricketer. Read's batting style is unknown. He was born at Thames Ditton, Surrey.

Read made a single first-class appearance for Surrey against Nottinghamshire in 1881 at The Oval. Surrey won the toss and elected to bat, making 293 all out, with Read being dismissed for 4 runs by William Attewell. Nottinghamshire responded in their first-innings by making 109 all out, with Surrey making them follow-on in their second-innings, with Nottinghamshire being dismissed in that innings for 162. Surrey won by an innings and 22 runs. This was his only major appearance for Surrey.

He died at Hounslow, Middlesex, on 4 May 1933. His brother, Maurice, played Test cricket for England, with Read appearing alongside him against Nottinghamshire in 1881. His uncle Heathfield Stephenson, also played first-class cricket.
