= Fred Reed (footballer) =

English footballer

Personal information
- Full name: Frederick William Marshall Reed
- Date of birth: March 1894
- Place of birth: Scotswood, England
- Date of death: 1967 (aged 72–73)
- Position: Centre half

Senior career*
Years	Team	Apps	(Gls)
1909–1910	Newburn		
1910–1911	Wesley Hall		
1911–1912	Benwell		
1912–1914	Lintz Institute		
1914–1927	West Bromwich Albion	138	(4)
- * Club domestic league appearances and goals

Frederick William Marshall Reed (March 1894 – 1967) was an English professional footballer who made over 130 appearances as a centre half in the Football League for West Bromwich Albion. He captained the club and after his retirement as a player, served it as a trainer until 1950.

== Personal life ==
Reed served as a sergeant in the Royal Fusiliers during the First World War.

== Career statistics ==
Appearances and goals by club, season and competition
Club	Season	League			FA Cup		Total	
Club	Season	Division	Apps	Goals	Apps	Goals	Apps	Goals
West Bromwich Albion	1914–15	First Division	3	0	0	0	3	0
West Bromwich Albion	1919–20	First Division	1	0	0	0	1	0
West Bromwich Albion	1920–21	First Division	1	0	0	0	1	0
West Bromwich Albion	1921–22	First Division	12	1	4	0	16	1
West Bromwich Albion	1923–24	First Division	27	1	5	1	32	2
West Bromwich Albion	1924–25	First Division	40	0	5	0	45	0
West Bromwich Albion	1925–26	First Division	39	2	2	0	41	2
West Bromwich Albion	1926–27	First Division	15	0	0	0	15	0
Career total			138	4	16	1	154	5
