= Arden, Barbour County, West Virginia =

Unincorporated community in West Virginia, United States

Arden
- Unincorporated community
- Location within the state of West Virginia Arden (the United States)
- Coordinates: 39°12′37″N 79°59′35″W
- Country: United States
- State: West Virginia
- County: Barbour
- Elevation: 1,270 ft (390 m)
- Time zone: UTC-5 (Eastern (EST))
  - Summer (DST): UTC-4 (EDT)
- GNIS feature ID: 1535001

Arden is a small unincorporated community located along the Tygart Valley River in Barbour County in the north central portion of the U.S. state of West Virginia.

The Arden settlement was built up along a stretch of the Baltimore and Ohio Railroad tracks; a narrow-gauge railroad was first laid through this area in the early 1880s. It had its own post office at one time.

The community is known today to whitewater enthusiasts as being situated between two landmark rock formations: Hell's Gate and Devil's Den. Many such recreationalists shoot the shallow rapids of the river through this pristine section of the Valley with its numerous large boulders and small falls. The area is home to a notable number of native wildflowers and is locally notorious for its occasional drownings. The community contains the famous Party Rock known for its flat formation for people to have parties on, and also known to take many people’s lives from falling off the rock.

== Notable person ==
- Ida Lilliard Reed (1865–1951), noted hymnwriter, lived nearby.
