= Frank Reed =

Frank Reed may refer to:

- Frank Reed (singer) (1954–2014), lead singer of the vocal group The Chi-Lites
- Frank Reed (American football) (born 1954), American football player
- Frank M. Reed (1861–?), Wisconsin state assemblyman
- Frank Reed (softball), head coach of the Chattanooga Lady Mocs softball team

== See also ==
- Frank Reid (disambiguation)
- Frank Reade, fictional character
