= Lynching of Jo Reed =

African American man who was lynched in the U.S.

- Location: Nashville, Tennessee, U.S.
- Date: April 30, 1875; 151 years ago
- Attack type: Lynching

Jo Reed was an African American man who was lynched in Nashville, Tennessee, on April 30, 1875, where he was taken by a white mob from the county jail after being arrested for killing a police officer in a confrontation. He was hanged from a suspension bridge but, after the rope broke, Reed survived the attempted lynching, escaped via the river, and left Nashville to go West.

In contrast to similar later incidents, both the governor of Tennessee and mayor of Nashville intervened after Reed was arrested, seeking extra police protection at the jail. (The sheriff did not supply it.) Rumors were rampant about a lynching, and the mayor tried to hold off the mob from the jail. The Nashville City Council condemned the lynching. Two white men were arrested for breaking into the jail, but no other prosecution took place.

== Lynching ==
On April 30, 1875, Robert Frazier, a police officer, attempted to arrest Jo Reed, an African-American man, in his Nashville home on suspicion of domestic violence. Frazier intended to take Reed to the workhouse but Reed told him he would not go, and shortly afterwards shot Frazier in the chest. Frazier died and Reed ran away, but he was arrested shortly after in Davidson County.

Reed was taken to the Davidson County Jail. Unidentified individuals in town began calling for his lynching. At 4PM on April 30, 1875, Tennessee Governor James D. Porter and Nashville Mayor Morton Boyte Howell met at the Maxwell House Hotel, where they asked Sheriff E. D. Whitworth and Deputy-Sheriff Wilkinson to add a guard in front of Reed's cell. The officers were unable or unwilling to find a guard to do it.

At dusk on April 30, a white mob rallied outside the jail, and police officers stood in front of the crowd. The mayor asked the mob to leave, but 25 unmasked men entered the jail and dragged Reed out of his cell. They put a noose around his neck, took him to a suspension bridge, and hanged him there. The rope broke and mob members shot at Reed, but he jumped into the river and escaped. Reed survived, returning to his house, where he saw a physician. He quickly left Nashville, and was believed to be going west, possibly to Kansas.

The Nashville City Council condemned the lynching, as did reporting by the Memphis Daily Appeal. On July 13, 1875, John W. Luster and Dan Gilmore were arrested for breaking into the jail. Luster admitted he was outside the jail, but he denied going in.

== Legacy ==
In June 2019 Jo Reed is to be acknowledged by his name on a memorial in downtown Nashville as a victim of attempted lynching in 1875. A metropolitan coalition known as "We Remember Nashville," together with the Equal Justice Initiative, plans events and education related to the four cases of lynching in the city in the late 19th century.
