= David E. Reed =

American journalist

David E. Reed (1927–1990), was a Reader's Digest roving editor.

== Career ==
He was born in Chicago, Illinois. He graduated from the University of Chicago at age 18 and began his journalism career with the Chicago City News Service. He later joined the Chicago Daily News.

Reed was a roving editor with Reader's Digest who reported from more than 100 countries and covered more than a dozen wars, including wars in Vietnam, Angola, Nicaragua, Cambodia, and many conflicts elsewhere in the world. Reed learned Swahili during a two-year fellowship from the Institute of Current World Affairs to Kenya during the Mau Mau insurgency in the 1950s. In the late 1950s, he was a reporter for the U.S. News & World Report. He joined the Reader's Digest in the early 1960s and worked there for the remainder of his lifetime. He interviewed several United States presidents, including then president Richard Nixon at the White House in 1971:. He was the author of 111 Days in Stanleyville, Harper & Row, NY, 1965 and Up Front in Vietnam, Funk & Wagnalls, NY, 1967. 111 Days in Stanleyville was reprinted as Save The Hostages, Bantam Books, NY, 1988.

Reed wrote 111 Days in Stanleyville after spending more than four years in Africa during seven trips there on writing assignments. He took a two-month overland trip across the continent, and climbed Mount Kilimanjaro. In 1960 he covered the independence push in Congo as a staff writer for the U.S. News & World Report magazine.

Reed wrote Up Front in Vietnam after spending months in Vietnam during the Vietnam War. He travelled across Vietnam, criss-crossing back and forth in C-130 cargo planes, helicopters, trucks and jeeps. In the book, Reed wrote a series of sketches about what it was like to be up front with the soldiers in the combat zone in Vietnam.

In 1988, Reed received the Republic of China's International Communications Service award.

Reed was inducted into the Chicago Journalism Hall of Fame posthumously in 1992.

== Selection of Reader's Digest articles by David E. Reed ==
North America

- Sunken Treasure!, 12/1990
- Don Williams, An American Worker’s Comeback, 04/1986
- Chicago, Rowdy Crossroads of America, 1986: Int’l
- Robots March on U.S; Industry, 04/1985
- Of Tender Heart and Generous Spirit," 03/1985
- Carlos Perez: "Hero of the ‘80’s," 09/1984
- The Yukon: River of the Midnight Sun, 07/1984
- Detroit Faces the Rising Sun: A New Day Dawns for the Motor City, 09/1983
- Jeane Kirkpatrick: America’s "Undiplomatic" Ambassador, 08/1982
- Search for the Missing Tomcat, 03/1977
- The Ohio Valley—America’s Newest Industrial Empire, 12/1963

Latin America

- "Good Morning, Cuba", 10/1988
- High Stakes in Nicaragua, 09/1987
- Can This Man Save the Panama Canal?, 01/1987
- El Salvador: Back from the Brink, 05/1985
- High Stakes in Central America, 08/1983
- Central America’s Beacon of Hope, 12/1981
- Haiti: A Nation in Agony, 10/1981
- Communism’s Bold Grab for Central America, 12/1980
- Argentina’s Appalling Reign of Terror, 06/1980
- The Man Who Defied Castro, 04/1980
- Nicaragua’s Somoza: Dictator at Bay, 01/1979
- Should We Give Up the Panama Canal? 05/1976
- The Legendary Career of Juan Peron, 1975: Int’l
- Palenque: Mexico’s Mysterious Lost City, 1974: Int’l
- The Night Managua Died, 05/1973
- Taps for Tupamaros, 11/1972
- The Last Days of Che Guevara, 04/1968
- Colossus of Rivers: The Amazon, 09/1963
- Cuba Revisited, 03/1961

Asia

- The Search for Billy, Continued, 02/1990
- South Korea: Going for the Gold, 09/1988
- Murder at 37,000 Feet, 05/1988
- Kidnapped by a Beloved Leader Comrade, 03/1987
- Asia’s Four Little Dragons, 09/1986
- Search for Billy, 06/1986
- Exclusive Interview with President Chiang Ching-Kuo, 1986: Int’l
- North Korea’s Secret Invasion Tunnels, 03/1980
- Singapore: Jewel of Prosperity, 11/1979
- The Realities of Recognizing China: An Editorial, 02/1979
- South Korea and Its Strongmen, 09/1978
- Singapore: Asia’s Big New Success Story, 1978: Int’l
- Mission: Mine Haiphong!, 02/1973
- The Agony of East Pakistan, by D. Reed & John E. Franzier, 11/1971
- Russia Turns it Wheels, 09/1970
- Vietnamization: Can it Succeed?, 04/1970
- Countdown on Okinawa, 11/1969
- Ordeal at the Embassy, 09/1968
- Korea: The War That Never Ends, by, 06/1968
- Hill 488: A Fight to Remember, by, 05/1968
- Stand Firm in Vietnam!, 01/1968
- Up Front in Vietnam, 09/1967
- Our "Limited" War in the South China Sea, 04/1967
- Tunku Abdul Rahman’s Malaysian Miracle, 02/1967
- How Firmness in Vietnam is Paying Off, 04/1966
- The Man for the Job in Vietnam, by D. Reed & John G. Hubbell, 01/1966
- We Must Stop Red China—Now!, 02/1965

Africa

- Can Mandela and de Kerk Save South Africa?, 09/1990
- Do South African Sanctions Make Sense?, 02/1989
- South Africa, Glimmers of Hope?, 08/1987
- Can this Man Save Africa?: 05/1987
- South Africa: Will White Rule End?, 02/1986
- South Africa’s Champion of Nonviolence, 01/1983
- Africa’s Wildlife: Countdown to Zero, 07/1982
- Russia’s Ruthless Reach into Africa: 11/1977
- Time Runs Out for South Africa, 02/1977
- The Lingering Tragedy of Ethiopia, 09/1976
- Angola’s Made in Moscow War, 06/1976
- The Rocky Road to Freedom, 01/1973
- The Tyrant Everybody Cultivates, 08/1972
- Comeback in the Congo, 04/1971
- A Nation is Dying!, 03/1969
- White vs. Black in Rhodesia, 10/1966
- Ghana: Communism’s Major Defeat in Africa, 06/1966
- The Stanleyville Massacre, 09/1965
- Rhino!, 07/1965
- Ivory Coast—Africa’s Big Success Story, 01/1965
- Express to the Mountains of the Moon, 09/1964
- Ghana: Communism’s New Foothold In Africa, 07/1964
- The Battle Against Sleeping Sickness, 07/1963
- Nigeria: Black Africa’s Brightest Hope, 03/1963
- Zanzibar: Laziest Place on Earth, 11/1962
- Africa’s River of Mystery, 09/1962
- Jomo Kenyatta: Africa’s Man of Mystery, 12/1961

Middle East

- Should We Trust Yasir Arafat?, 09/1989
- Turmoil in the Holy Land, 11/1988
- The Unholy War Between Iran and Iraq, 08/1984
- Bethlehem’s Man in the Middle, 02/1984
- Jordan’s Indestructible King Hussein, 08/1981
- Qaddafi, Libya’s Lord of Terror, 06/1981
- Russia’s Real Target: The Middle East Oil Fields, 07/1980
- Israel’s Menachem Begin; Key to Middle East Peace, 04/1978
- The Arch-Terrorist Who Went Scot-Free, 09/1977
- Syria’s Assad: Pivotal New Force in the Middle East, 08/1976
- Jerusalem—Too Holy for its Own Good, 03/1975
- The Man Who Changed Middle Eastern History, 06/1974
- Qaddafi of Libya: The Big Question Mark in Oil, 11/1973
- Golda Meir: Israel’s Tough Grandmother-Prime Minister, 07/1971
- The Fedayeen—Israel’s Fanatic Foe, 10/1970
- Bourguiba: Wise Voice in the Arab World, 06/1969

Europe

- Maggie Thatcher: "She’s All Backbone," 11/1987
- Terror in Northern Ireland: The American Connection, 04/1983
- Northern Ireland’s Agony Without End, 01/1982
- East Germany’s Sister Superspook, 12/1980
- First and Last of the Sports Cars, 1980: Int’l
- The Professionals—Britain’s New Army, 1980: Int’l
- What End to Ulster’s Agony, 1979: Int’l
- A King’s Struggle for Democracy, 05/1979
- The Man Who Restored Democracy to Greece, 05/1978
- Britain Defends the Admiral’s Cup, 1977:Int’l
- East Germany: People for Sale, 10/1976
- Cyprus: Tiny Island, Big Uproar, 12/1975
- What’s Happening to Portugal? 10/1975
- Northern Ireland—the Endless War, 07/1975
- Front Line Ulster, 1975: Int’l
- Finland and Its View of the World, 1975: Int’l
- Spain After Franco—What Will Happen?, 01/1975
- East Germany Comes in From the Cold, 03/1974
- Yugoslavia: Time Bomb in Europe, 04/1973
- Greece: Outcast of Europe, 07/1972
- Northern Ireland’s Bloody Impasse, 01/1972

== Early life and family ==
David Reed, son of Frank and Helen Reed, was born in 1927 and grew up in Chicago, Illinois. His father was a successful Chicago real estate broker. His grandfather, Thomas A. Reed, had migrated to Chicago from central Pennsylvania and worked at the 1893 World’s Columbian Exposition, also known as the "Chicago World’s Fair." He started a successful plastering and construction company at the Chicago World's Fair, now known as the Reed Illinois Corporation, which still exists in Chicago to the present day.

One of Reed’s 2nd great-grandfathers: James Pettit (1777–1849), and his son Eber M. Pettit (1802–1885), operated a station on the Underground Railroad in New York state to assist escaping slaves from the South. Eber M. Pettit wrote "Sketches in the History of the Underground Railroad," in 1879, which was reprinted in 1999. Jonathan Pettit (1752–1833), Reed's 3rd great-grandfather, served as a captain in the American Revolution in New York state. Reed was also related to the Adams presidential family.

David Reed was married to Marilyn "Mari" Chevalier, then of New York City, from 1961 to 1977, and had three children. He was married to Audrey Hamilton of Johannesburg, South Africa in the late 1970s. He married Irene Whitaker, then of Maryland, in 1988.

David Reed was an avid sailor. At different times while travelling the globe, he was based in New York, Connecticut, Florida, Maryland, and Virginia.
