= Stuart Reid (English journalist) =

Stuart Reid (born 1943, Bradford, Yorkshire) is an English writer and editor. An alumnus of Ampleforth College, he has authored the "Charterhouse" column for The Catholic Herald, and previously served as deputy editor of The Spectator under former editor Boris Johnson, who was later elected Mayor of London.

He was highly praised in a 2022 column by Matthew Parris: ""From the columnist’s point of view, Johnson had been the perfect editor, often absent, even when present disinclined to interfere, and happy to let a thousand flowers bloom, plus a fair quotient of weeds too. His deputy at the time was an under-sung hero, Stuart Reid, a kind, scholarly and careful man, and an unobtrusively deft editor with a good eye for quality – besides being a patient clearer-up of his boss’s messes. So whenever anyone starts telling you about Johnson’s glorious reign at The Spectator, spare a thought for the man who made it possible. Indeed, whenever anyone starts telling you about any significant achievement in our Prime Minister’s career, spare a thought for the somebody-else who made it possible."
