= Eddie Reed (baseball) =

American baseball player

- Outfielder
- Born: October 12, 1929; Straven, Alabama, U.S.
- Died: January 25, 2009 (aged 79); Great Falls, Montana, U.S.
- Batted: Left Threw: Right

Negro league baseball debut
- 1953, for the Memphis Red Sox

Last appearance
- 1955, for the Memphis Red Sox

Edward Lee Reed (October 12, 1929 – January 25, 2009) was an American Negro league outfielder for the Memphis Red Sox in the 1950s.

A native of Straven, Alabama, Reed served in the US Army prior to his professional baseball career. Reed was selected to represent Memphis in the 1953 East–West All-Star Game. He continued to play minor league baseball through 1962. Reed died in Great Falls, Montana in 2009 at age 79.
