= David Jay Reed =

Australian artist

- Born: 1950 (age 75–76); Yokosuka, Japan
- Occupation: Drawing teacher at the Galleria Art Studio.
- Known for: Printmaking, acting, photography, graphic designing

David Jay Reed (born 1950) is an artist who has also been an actor, photographer, graphic designer, lecturer, and artist of various mediums.

== Early life ==
Reed was born in Yokosuka, Japan, and as a child travelled between Japan, the United States, and Australia.

He received an Associateship in Arts from Contra Costa College, California, in 1969. While studying, he worked as a cartoonist for the Lafayette Sun and the college newspaper The Advocate.

== Studies, teaching and travel ==
After graduation, Reed traveled to Perth, Western Australia to study graphic design at the Western Australia Institute of Technology (now Curtin University). He received an Associateship in Design in 1973.

Reed worked for various graphic design agencies in Perth. In 1975, he was hired as an education officer for the Art Gallery of Western Australia and worked full-time until 1988 when he went part-time to become an adjunct lecturer for the Department of TAFE (now Central Institute of Technology).

His job, as an education officer, was to tour exhibitions throughout Western Australia. It was during this time that he began producing his own artwork. In 1990, Reed completed a Diploma in Printmaking, and one year later resigned from the Art Gallery of Western Australia to begin full-time lecturing at TAFE.

Since childhood, he had always been interested in Japan, so in 1992 Reed went back for five years to reacquaint himself with the Japanese lifestyle. While living in Tokyo, he met Keith Howard (1950–2015), who was developing a non-toxic method of printmaking.

Reed became an advocate of Howard's research and frequented several of his workshops in Canada and Australia. Howard suggested that he complete a master's degree in non-toxic printmaking.

He relocated to Rochester, New York, to embark on a Master of Fine Arts degree, at the Rochester Institute of Technology (RIT). While studying, Reed invented a four-colour non-toxic printmaking process, which was published in Keith Howard's The Contemporary Printmaker: Intaglio-Type & Acrylic Resist Etching.

Reed completed his master's in 2002. After graduation, he worked as a professor at RIT in the printmaking and foundations departments.

In 2008, he travelled to Beijing, China to establish a Diploma Visual Arts course for the International Baccalaureate (IB) program at Beijing Huijia Private School, and worked as the HOD until July 2020. He now resides back in Perth, Western Australia, and teaches drawing classes at the Galleria Art Studio in Morley.

== Influences ==
According to Nevill Drury, Reed's “early training in design has led to formalistic qualities in his imagery and he acknowledges this as an important factor in his work. The images he produces are usually created for specific exhibitions and derived from his own experiences - relating mostly to places he has visited, personal relationships or objects in his immediate surroundings”.

== Representation ==
Reed has many years of printmaking experience and has won several international awards. His work can be found in several Perth collections, including the Family Courts, Alexander Library, Newman College and Perth Children's Hospital.

He has also been included in group exhibitions in Belgium, Bulgaria, Brazil, Canada, Japan, Spain, Poland and the United States. He is represented in the Bureau of Art Exhibitions, Lodz, Poland; the Exlibriscentrum, Sint Niklass, Belgium; and private collections in Canada, England, Germany, Netherlands, Russia and United States.

== Printed works ==
Reed, David Jay Come up and See my Etching, Australian Artist. Issue No. 74, August 1990. Pgs. 50–54.

Drury, Nevill (1992) New Art Seven, Fine Art Publishing. ISBN 9 768 09718 3

Virgona, Katrina (1993) The Unknown Passenger (Some of the Secrets), Illustrated by David Jay Reed. Cactus Publishing. ISBN 0 646 15936 4

Howard, Keith (2003) The Contemporary Printmaker: Intaglio-Type & Acrylic Resist Etching. David Jay Reed. (contributor) Write Cross Press. ISBN 0 974 19460 3
