= Mark Reed (sculptor) =

British sculptor based in East Anglia (born 1971)

Mark Reed (born 23 March 1971) is a British sculptor based in East Anglia, in the United Kingdom. Reed works primarily in metals, using bronze, mild steel, stainless steel and aluminium. According to Reed, his themes include "nature and his place within it, science, the environment, family and the passage of time."

== Biography ==
Born in Colchester, Reed spent his early years in Suffolk, relocating with his family to a fruit farm in rural Norfolk in his teens. The trees in the orchards he once pruned and shaped were inspiration for much of Reed's sculpture and furniture.

Reed initially designed nature-inspired furniture, casting all of his bronze sculptures himself in studio. Reed is known for his tree sculptures in forged steel, the individual branches heated in the forge and then tapered on the anvil, giving the appearance of a "fluid shape of the tree beginning to 'grow'".

== Public works ==
In 2004 Reed worked on his first public commission Bronze and Cast Iron Tree Planters for The Prince's Trust and the City of London, unveiled by the Lord Mayor of the City.

Reed has created public works in the UK, spurred by his "concerns about climate change" which prompted his 10 meter Wave installation (2021) and the sale of many of the 3,000 fish raised thousands of pounds for Norwich Cathedral Charities. Reed's Tree of Life sculpture (2022), with over 2,000 patinated stainless steel engravable leaves, raises funds for Kings Lynn Hospital's League of Friends. In 2023, The Serving Ace Meeting Tree, a 3.658 meter bronze sculpture commissioned from Reed by the All England Club, was installed on the grounds of Wimbledon.

Reed's sculptures reflect his interest in the workings of natural structures and the way they contribute to the artistic view of a plant or animal.

Selected works
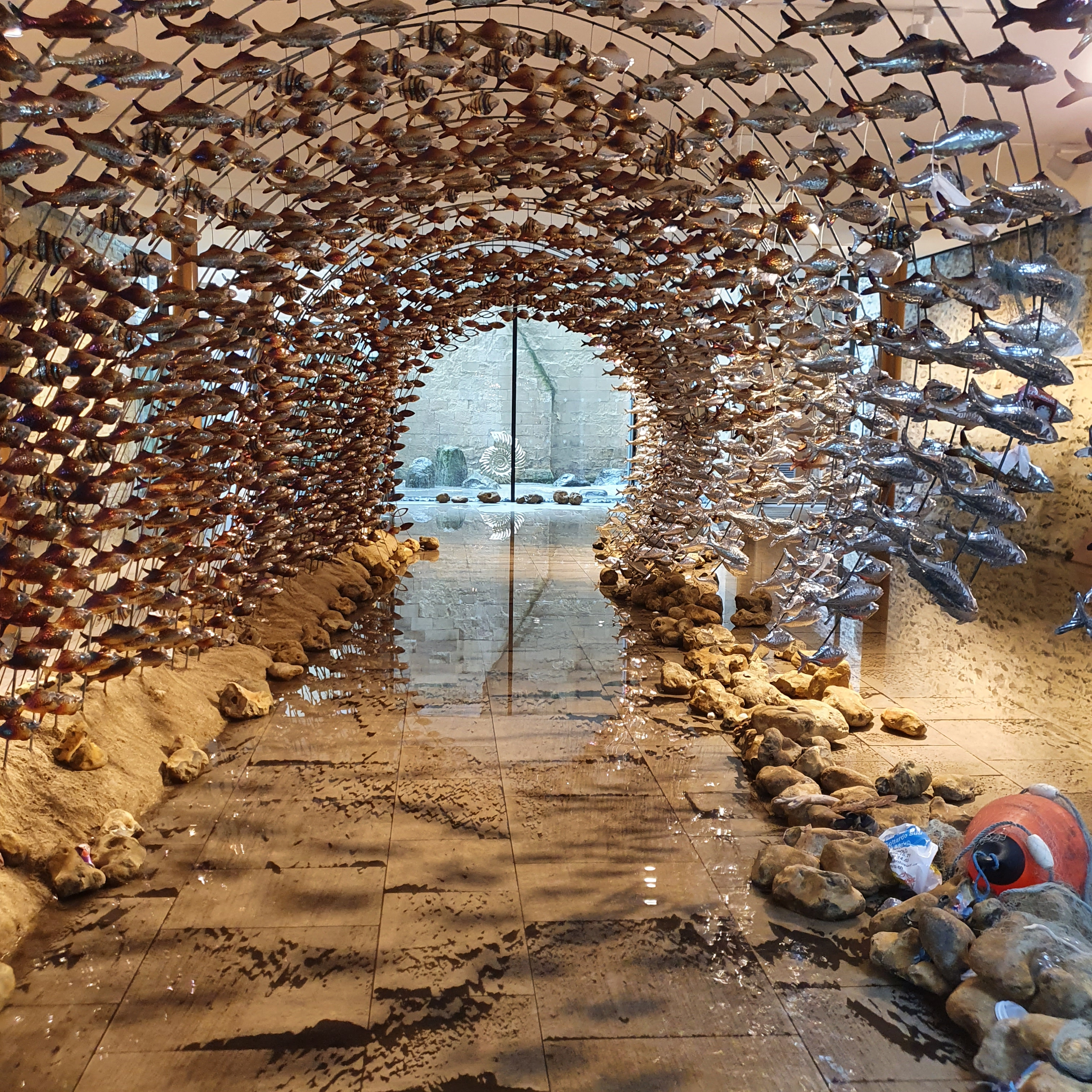
Wave sculpture installation with fish at Norwich Cathedral

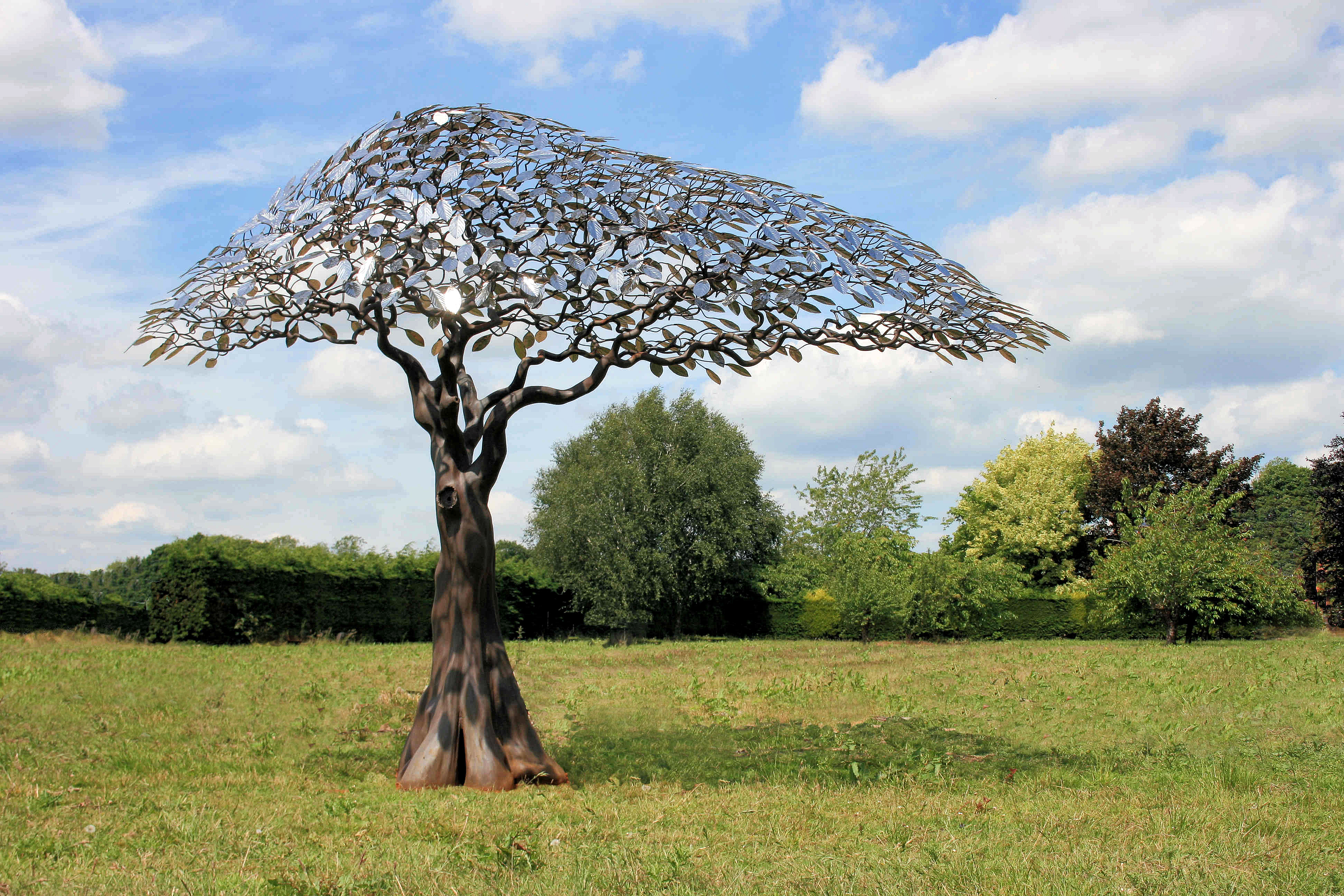
Arbour Metallum in Sculpture Park

Tree of Life sculpture at Queen Elizabeth Hospital, Kings Lynn NHS Trust
