= T. Edward Reed =

Canadian zoologist

- Education: University of London
- Scientific career
- Fields: Anthropology; Pediatrics; Zoology
- Workplaces: University of Toronto
- Thesis: A genetical study of human hair colour (1952)
- Doctoral students: Emoke Szathmary

T. Edward Reed is a Canadian zoologist, anthropologist, and pediatrician. He became a junior geneticist at the University of Michigan's Heredity Clinic in 1952. He was appointed Professor and Chair of the Department of Zoology at the University of Toronto in 1960, succeeding Norma Ford Walker. Among Reed's doctoral students at the University of Toronto was Emoke Szathmary.
