= Stephen Reed (physician) =

American geologist, physician and publisher

Stephen Reed (September 26, 1801 – July 12, 1877) was an American medical doctor, newspaper publisher and geologist.

Reed, the younger son of John and Susanna (Beach) Reed, was born in Cornwall, Connecticut, on September 26, 1801. When he was ten years old, his parents moved to Canaan, Connecticut, from where he went to college. He graduated from Yale College in 1824. After two or three years spent in teaching school and in studying medicine, he established himself as a physician in Goshen, Connecticut. A year later he moved to Roxbury, Connecticut, and in 1831 to Richmond, Massachusetts. Finding the exposure to the severity of the weather too much for his rather delicate constitution, he gave up his profession in about 1837 and opened a boarding school for boys in Richmond. In 1848, he moved to Pittsfield, Massachusetts, to take charge of an agricultural warehouse and seed store, connected with a printing office from which a weekly agricultural and miscellaneous newspaper, the Berkshire Agriculturist, was published. This paper, which he renamed The Culturist and Gazette, he continued to edit until 1858, when its publication was suspended. The paper published a satirical piece by Pittsfield resident Herman Melville in 1850. Reed afterwards sold his share in the warehouse and spent the rest of his life in Pittsfield, at leisure for his favorite study, geology. His name became well known in connection with geological discoveries in western New England, mainly through his account of a long train of boulders across part of Central Berkshire. He was also active in all the public interests of the town. He died in Pittsfield, after less than a week's illness, on July 12, 1877, aged nearly 76 years.

He was married in 1829 to Emeline Beebe, a student of Sarah Pierce's Litchfield Female Academy, of Canaan, who died in 1832; and again on May 7, 1833, to Sarah E. Chapin, who survived him. He had no children.
