= Stuart Reid (children's book author) =

Scottish children's author

Stuart Reid is a Scottish writer and the author of the Gorgeous George series of children's books.

== Background ==
Reid lived in Dubai for two years, working as a manager for the Premier Inn hotel chain. He managed the chain's first hotel outside Britain, a 300-room hotel in Dubai. In 2009 Reid decided to return to Scotland with a plan to make a living writing books for children.

== Gorgeous George ==
Reid's first book Gorgeous George and the Giant Geriatric Generator was released in 2011. It is the story of a fictitious town where people go missing, and the main character sets out to find them. The book was illustrated by Calvin Innes.

Innes, then still a student at university, decided not only to illustrate the book but to found a publishing company, My Little Big Town (MLBT), to publish it. The company was launched in 2011 at the Enterprise Centre of Hull University.

== Performances ==
Reid promotes his books by speaking at schools and children's events, and has performed at schools in Dubai, Hong Kong and Australia. According to The Advertiser newspaper in Adelaide, Australia, Reid "has found a clever way to sell more books" by travelling the festival circuit doing funny talks about books and writing for kids. He has appeared at the Edinburgh Fringe and the Adelaide Fringe.

== Personal life ==
Reid lives near Falkirk with his wife and their two daughters.

== Gorgeous George books ==
- Gorgeous George and the Giant Geriatric Generator (2011) Published by My Little Big Town
- Gorgeous George and the Zigzag Zit-faced Zombies Published by Gorgeous Garage Publishing
- Gorgeous George and the Unidentified Unsinkable Underpants Part 1 Published by Gorgeous Garage Publishing
- Gorgeous George and the Unidentified Unsinkable Underpants Part 2 Published by Gorgeous Garage Publishing
- Gorgeous George and his Stupid Stinky Stories Published by Gorgeous Garage Publishing
- Gorgeous George and the Jumbo Jobby Juicer (2017) Published by Gorgeous Garage Publishing
- Gorgeous George and the Timewarp Trouser Trumpets Published by Gorgeous Garage Publishing
- Gorgeous George and the Incredible Iron-Bru-Man Incident
