= Murder of David Reed =

1985 child murder in Pennsylvania, United States

- Location: Schuylkill Haven, Pennsylvania, U.S.
- Date: August 21, 1985; 41 years ago
- Attack type: Homicide
- Victims: David Wellington Reed, aged 13
- Perpetrator: Joseph Geiger
- Charges: Third-degree murder; Involuntary manslaughter; Evidence tampering; Abuse of corpse

David Wellington Reed (January 17, 1972 – August 21, 1985) was a 13-year-old boy in seventh grade at Schuylkill Haven Area Middle School, who was murdered in 1985 by then 20-year-old Joseph "Joe" Geiger in Schuylkill Haven, Pennsylvania, United States, over Geiger's stolen illegally grown cannabis plants. Geiger blamed Reed for the disappearance of the drug. Friends, family, and teachers remember Reed as an outgoing person who aspired to fly.

Reed's death remained unsolved for 23 years, until the case was reopened in 2005 by the Schuylkill Haven police department. Geiger was arrested in 2008 on the 23rd anniversary of Reed's death and was found guilty of third-degree murder, involuntary manslaughter, evidence tampering, and abuse of corpse, among other offenses.

== Murder ==
Reed and his siblings, James and Virginia, had begun using marijuana from young adolescence, and had even begun dealing it themselves during 1985. On the night of August 21, 1985, 13-year-old Reed left home on his bicycle to meet up with friends 20-year-old Joe Geiger and 14-year-old John F. Fry Jr., to drink beer and smoke marijuana in an abandoned caboose at the local train station.

After a while, Geiger began to accuse Reed of stealing his illegally grown cannabis plants. Suddenly, Geiger stood up and shocked Reed and Fry by punching Reed in the head, causing Reed to fall out of the caboose and smash his skull against the metal rails of the train tracks. Reed was knocked unconscious but was still breathing.

Geiger told Fry to leave at this point. Fry, intimidated by the man, left and did not participate in the actual murder and cover-up of the murder that followed. Years later, he admitted to police that he was unaware that Reed died until his body was discovered.

Geiger then carried Reed's body a few hundred yards into the surrounding woods in Cressona where he left the body. Although the location of Reed's body was less than 100 yards from Reed's home, the body was not discovered until December 1985.

Reed's mother called police when David failed to return home the next day.

== Initial investigation ==
In December 1985, Geiger reported to the Schuylkill Haven police department that—over the course of 3 to 4 months—his two pet dogs had been retrieving bones from the woods in Cressona, where he often allowed them to play. Geiger said that he was unaware that the bones were actually human until the dogs had brought back a human skull. The body was positively identified as David Reed by authorities. Police noted that the body was about a half mile from his bicycle.

Because he was the one to report the discovery of Reed's body, both the authorities and Reed's family did not suspect Geiger played a role in Reed's death. In fact, authorities did not suspect foul play at all. Although they did report that the death seemed "suspicious," they were satisfied with a coroner at the University of Penn's conclusion that Reed plausibly had died of previously undiagnosed diabetes complications upon autopsy. The actual case files ruled the death as "undetermined" in April 1986, and the case laid cold for the next 20 years.

== Case reopened ==
In 2005, the Schuylkill Haven police department decided to reopen the case of Reed's mysterious death per the request of Virginia Reed Meadows, Reed's sister. Meadows had died the year beforehand and police decided to finally adhere to her pleas. The surviving members of the Reed family were pleased with the decision to officially reopen the case, saying that the original investigation had been "inadequate."

Corporal Robert S. Betnar was assigned to the investigation. He discovered inconsistencies with Geiger's testimonies during the initial investigation and dug deeper into the case. Geiger, now 40, was unemployed and residing in nearby Pottsville with a wife and young son. Betnar decided to redo the investigation from scratch.

=== New leads ===
New testimonies from multiple friends of Geiger's confessed that Geiger had mentioned throughout the years things that alluded to him killing Reed. In 2007, Christopher Mager told troopers that Geiger had told him at a party some years ago that Geiger had jokingly told him while high on cocaine, "If you ever want to murder somebody, do it in Schuylkill County because you can get away with it." Mager said that when he asked Geiger who he had killed, Geiger had told him, "Reed." Some friends also recall that in 1985, around the time Reed allegedly began stealing marijuana from Geiger, that Geiger had sworn he was going to murder whoever was stealing the drugs, and that he was determined to figure out the culprit.

Fry, then 37, confessed to police that he believed he was an eyewitness to the murder of Reed, and gave the investigators his side of the story. He made clear that he did not participate in the actual death or cover-up and was unaware that Geiger had actually killed Reed until Reed's body was discovered in December 1985. He also admitted he had previously lied to the police about his whereabouts and knowledge of Reed's disappearance and death in the initial investigation.

At the request of police, Schuylkill County Coroner David Dutcavich petitioned the Schuylkill County Court of Common Pleas for an Order to exhume Reed's body for further examination. Upon receipt of the Order by Judge Jacqueline Russell, Reed was exhumed from his resting place at Schuylkill Memorial Park to have a second autopsy done on January 24, 2008. The autopsy was done by Dr. Anthony Falsetti, an anthropologist at the University of Florida, who concluded that Reed had actually died of head trauma and noted that his skull was fractured. This matched Fry's description of Reed striking his head on the tracks, which would have had enough impact force to fracture Reed's skull.

Investigators then began to build a solid case against Joe Geiger.

=== Geiger's arrest ===
Joseph "Joe" Geiger was arrested in his home in Pottsville, Pennsylvania, a town near Schuylkill Haven. Upon arrest, he denied all involvement and instead pinned Fry as the murderer. Police did not believe him. Geiger said, "I didn't do it. I didn't admit to nothing." Police say that when they informed Geiger of the charges against him, Geiger began to cry and said that he could not afford a lawyer. Police believe Geiger was abusing methamphetamines at the time of his arrest and had not slept for days.

Police and District Attorney James Goodman would not publicly release details of their evidence against Geiger besides witness testimonies, but did report that Joe Geiger "was able to account for all of the known injuries to David Reed before the police or other medical experts were able to determine them."

Geiger was held without bail until his trial. He pleaded guilty on all charges, and, as part of a plea agreement, the charges for aggravated assault and third-degree murder were dropped against him. Aggravated assault was amended to simple assault. Geiger was found guilty. Part of his sentence was that he had to pay for the reburial of Reed.

== See also ==
- Unsolved deaths
- Molly Bish
- Leigh Leigh
- Shanda Sharer
- Skylar Neese
