= Reed (name) =

Reed may be either a surname or given name.

== Reed as a surname ==
Reed
- variations on red

Origin
- Language: English
- Meaning: literally, the colour red. It is a variant of Reid, which refers to ruddy complexion or red hair

Other names
- Variant form: Read

"Reed" is commonly believed to be a nickname-derived surname referring to a person's complexion or hair being ruddy or red.

At least one example of the Reed surname, that originating in the County of Northumberland in northern England, is derived from a location, the valley of Redesdale and the River Rede that runs through it.

In the United States, Reed was adopted by some Pennsylvania Dutch (German) families in the 18th century, notably that of John Reed (Johannes Reith), a former Hessian soldier from Raboldshausen, Germany, who made the first documented gold find in the United States in 1799. The Reed Gold Mine is today a State Historic Site in Cabarrus County, North Carolina.

'Reed' appears as a surname most commonly in English-speaking countries, especially in the United States, where it was the 55th most common surname in 1990 accounting for about 0.12% of the population. In Great Britain, 'Reed' ranked at 158th (0.081%) and 183rd (0.073%) in 1881 and 1998, respectively, with little or no change in internal distribution among counties during the intervening century. In Ireland, Reed is among the 100 most common surnames, and in the Irish province of Ulster it is among the 40 most common surnames. The relative frequencies in 1998 among several countries were United States >> Great Britain > Australia ~ New Zealand ~ Canada >> Northern Ireland >> Ireland.

'Reed' has been adopted by several notable actors as their stage surname in preference to their birth names (see #Pseudonyms and aliases, below).

=== Reeds of Northumberland ===
The Reeds of Northumberland in England were originally centered around the chief Reed residence at Troughend in Redesdale, on the banks of the River Rede. According to Sir Walter Scott:

These Reeds of Troughend were a very ancient family, as may be conjectured from their deriving their surname from the river on which they had their mansion. An epitaph on one of their tombs affirms that the family have held their lands of Troughend, which are situated on the Reed nearly opposite to Otterburn, for the incredible space of nine hundred years.

The earliest reference to the Reeds of Troughend is from 1400, when "Thomas Reed of Redysdale" is recorded in county records as paying "to William de Swinburne in the sum of 20 pds...for the ransom of William Moetrop of Tenedale". In 1429 Thomas Reed is again recorded, as serving on a jury in Elsdon. In 1442, a John Reed is described as "the Laird of Troughwen, the chief of the name of Reed, and divers of his followers...a ruder and more lawless crew there needs not be..."

The Reeds of Northumberland were one of the Border Reiver families of the 16th century, who lived by blackmail and cattle rustling in the Anglo-Scottish border country.

One notable Reed was Percival Reed, believed to have been Laird of Troughend in the 1580s and 1590s. His story has been handed down in The Death of Parcy Reed, a traditional Border ballad (Child Ballad 193). This song tells of an alliance between the Halls of Redesdale and the Crosiers of Liddesdale in Scotland, against the Reeds. Percival Reed held the office of Keeper of Redesdale, and had arrested one Whinton Crosier for raiding in the valley. This put the Reeds at feud with the Crosier family. The Halls, old friends of Percy Reed, turned against him and conspired with the Crosiers to trap him while he was out hunting. When the Crosiers ambushed Percy, the Halls watched as he was murdered. Percy stood alone unarmed against the Crosiers, and according to the ballad:

They fell upon him all at once,
They mangled him most cruellie;
The slightest wound might cause his deith,
And they have given him thirty-three:
They hacket off his hands and feet,
And left him lying on the lee.

Percy Reed's ghost is said to have haunted Redesdale for many years, and "at times he would come gallantly cantering across the moorland as he had done when blood ran warm in his veins. ...And yet, again, he would come as a fluttering, homeless soul, whimpering and formless, with a moaning cry for Justice—Justice—Judgment on him who had by black treachery hurried him unprepared to his end."

=== In Norway ===
Many Norwegians use a last name derived from their family farm or town. Reed is a village Gloppen Municipality in Vestland county in Norway. As of 2010, 325 share the surname Reed.

== Geographical distribution ==
At the time of the United Kingdom Census of 1881, the frequency of the surname Reed was highest in the following counties:

1. Northumberland (1: 378)
2. County Durham (1: 419)
3. Sussex (1: 456)
4. Huntingdonshire (1: 487)
5. Devon (1: 509)
6. Cornwall (1: 519)
7. Cumberland (1: 572)
8. Essex (1: 641)
9. Somerset (1: 650)
10. Hertfordshire (1: 651)

As of 2014, the frequency of the surname was highest in the following countries and territories:

1. United States (1: 1,071)
2. United States Virgin Islands (1: 1,612)
3. Wales (1: 1,675)
4. American Samoa (1: 1,851)
5. Liberia (1: 1,916)
6. England (1: 1,917)
7. Anguilla (1: 1,922)
8. Jersey (1: 1,980)
9. Cayman Islands (1: 2,133)
10. New Zealand (1: 2,301)

As of 2014, 78.4% of all known bearers of the surname Reed were residents of the United States. The frequency of the surname was higher than national average in the following U.S. states:

1. Arkansas (1: 491)
2. West Virginia (1: 505)
3. Mississippi (1: 554)
4. Tennessee (1: 556)
5. Wyoming (1: 634)
6. Oklahoma (1: 639)
7. Kentucky (1: 650)
8. Delaware (1: 662)
9. Louisiana (1: 667)
10. Indiana (1: 713)
11. Missouri (1: 723)
12. Kansas (1: 726)
13. Vermont (1: 733)
14. Alabama (1: 753)
15. Ohio (1: 762)
16. Maine (1: 807)
17. Iowa (1: 858)
18. Idaho (1: 875)
19. Texas (1: 918)
20. Oregon (1: 940)
21. Colorado (1: 945)
22. Michigan (1: 949)
23. Pennsylvania (1: 1,012)
24. Washington (1: 1,025)
25. Virginia (1: 1,031)
26. Maryland (1: 1,036)
27. Alaska (1: 1,039)
28. Illinois (1: 1,064)

The frequency of the surname was highest (over six times the national average) in the following U.S. counties:

1. Coleman County, Texas (1: 48)
2. Washington County, Ala. (1: 58)
3. Issaquena County, Miss. (1: 70)
4. Briscoe County, Texas (1: 73)
5. Cannon County, Tenn. (1: 77)
6. Love County, Okla. (1: 80)
7. Rhea County, Tenn. (1: 84)
8. Cleveland County, Ark. (1: 94)
9. Cameron County, Pa. (1: 102)
10. Daggett County, Utah (1: 102)
11. Hardin County, Ill. (1: 105)
12. Owsley County, Ky. (1: 108)
13. Jefferson County, Miss. (1: 111)
14. Carter County, Mo. (1: 112)
15. Niobrara County, Wyo. (1: 116)
16. Evangeline Parish, La. (1: 118)
17. Floyd County, Va. (1: 125)
18. Iron County, Mo. (1: 129)
19. Humphreys County, Miss. (1: 129)
20. Winston County, Miss. (1: 130)
21. Robertson County, Ky. (1: 131)
22. Thomas County, Neb. (1: 140)
23. Magoffin County, Ky. (1: 147)
24. Sherman County, Texas (1: 147)
25. Upshur County, W.Va. (1: 159)
26. Summers County, W.Va. (1: 160)
27. Wyoming County, W.Va. (1: 166)
28. Esmeralda County, Nev. (1: 166)
29. Gilmer County, W.Va. (1:173)

=== Pseudonyms and aliases ===
- Donald Reed (actor) (1901–1973), Mexico, born "Ernesto Avila Guillen", emigrated to the United States
- United States
  - Alan Reed (1907–1977), born "Teddy Bergman"
  - Donna Reed (1921–1986), born "Donnabelle Mullenger"
  - B. Mitchel Reed (1926–1983), born "Burton Mitchel Goldberg"
  - Alaina Reed Hall (1946–2009), sometimes billed as "Alaina Reed" (African American)
  - Alto Reed (living), American saxophonist

=== Fictional characters ===
- Australian television: Shannon Reed, Reed (Home and Away)
- Japanese anime and manga: Clow Reed, Kazana Reed, Fei-Wang Reed, Lucy Reed
- English literature: surname of Jane Eyre's aunt's family in Charlotte Brontë's Jane Eyre
- United States television: Curtis Reed, Billie Reed, Austin Reed (fiction), Lauren Reed, Malcolm Reed, Jonathan Reed (African American), Nikki Reed Fulton Reed (mighty duck's), Reed (Andi Mack)
- Scott Reed, a character in the Netflix series 13 Reasons Why
- Reed Richards - founding member of Marvel Comics' Fantastic Four.
- Webcomics: Marten Reed from Questionable Content

== Reed as a given name ==
Reed
- variations on red
- Gender: Unisex
- Language: English

Origin
- Language: Old English
- Origin: Reed (surname)
- Meaning: literally, the colour red. It is a variant of Read, which refers to ruddy complexion or red hair.
- Region of origin: England

Other names
- Variant forms: Reid, Read, Reade

"Reed" is an uncommon male and female given name. In the United States, "Reed" fluctuated among ranks of 400th to 1100th from 1881 through 2006, showing peaks in 1995 (rank 414) and 1949 (417) and a nadir in 1886 (1079). Information for other countries has insufficient depth to detect use of "Reed" as a given name.

=== Born after 1800 ===
- United States
  - Reed Smoot (1862–1941)
  - Reed A. Albee (1886–1961)
  - Reed F. Cutler (1887–1964)
  - Reed Chambers (1894–1972)

=== Born after 1900 ===
- United States
  - (1910–1997) Reed Champion
  - (1911–1974) Reed Hadley
  - (1911–2002) Reed Green (American football)
  - (1917–1986) Reed Sarratt
  - (1917–1982) Reed Crandall
  - (1917–1992) Reed Erickson
  - (1922–2004) Reed Irvine
  - (born c. 1942) Reed Wickner
- Canada (born 1945) Reed Elley
- United States^{2}
  - (born 1948) Reed Hundt, Reed V. Hillman
  - (born 1949) Reed Waller, Reed Slatkin

=== Born after 1950 ===
- United States
  - (born 1956) Reed Larson
  - (born 1957) Reed Hearon
  - (born 1963) Reed Pierce
  - (born 1964) Reed Gershwind
  - (born 1967) Reed Diamond
  - (born 1972) Reed Cowan
  - (born 1976) Reed Johnson
- Canada (born 1976) Reed Low
- United States^{2}
  - (born 1977) Reed Morano
  - (born 1979) Reed Stringer
  - (born 1980) Reed Gusciora
  - (born 1980) Reed Timmer
  - (born 1982) Reed Doughty
  - (born 1983) Reed Hoskins
  - (born 1994) Reed Alexander
  - (born 1994) Reed Kessler
  - (born 1999) Reed Blankenship
  - (born 2000) Reed Trimble

=== Born after 2000 ===
- United States
  - (born 2004) Reed Sheppard

=== Living with unknown birth year ===
- United States
  - Reed Arvin, American record producer
  - Reed Mangels, American dietitian
  - Reed Shuldiner, American law professor at the University of Pennsylvania Law School

=== Pseudonyms and aliases ===
- United States
  - Reed Cowan (born "Darrin Reed Cowan")
  - Reed Ghazala (born "Qubais Reed Ghazala")
  - Reed Hastings (born "Wilmot Reed Hastings, Jr.")
  - Reed Morn (born "Frieda Johanna Drewerk")
  - Reed Sorenson (born "Bradley Reed Sorenson")
  - Reed Whittemore (born "Edward Reed Whittemore Jr.")

=== Fictional characters ===
- United States television: Reed Adamson (Grey's Anatomy)
- United States television: Reed Garrett (CSI: NY), Reed Pollock, Reed (Fresh Beat Band of Spies), Reed Strucker (The Gifted)
- United States comics: Mister Fantastic
- United States gaming: Reed Wahl, antagonist from the expansion Minerva's Den from Bioshock 2.
- Literature: Three Seagrass, in the Arkady Martine novel A Memory Called Empire, is called "Reed" by her close friends

== See also ==
- Reed (disambiguation)
- Read (surname)
- Reid, about the surname
- Reid (disambiguation), about the given name
- Reade (name), given name and surname
- Rede (disambiguation)
- Rhead

=== Human name disambiguation pages ===
- Adam Reed (disambiguation)
- Alex Reed (disambiguation)
- Andrew Reed (disambiguation)
- Daniel Reed (disambiguation)
- David Reed (disambiguation)
- Donald Reed (disambiguation)
- Edward Reed (disambiguation)
- Henry Reed (disambiguation)
- J. R. Reed (disambiguation)
- Jack Reed (disambiguation)
- James Reed (disambiguation)
- Jeff Reed (disambiguation)
- Joe Reed (disambiguation)
- John Reed (disambiguation)
- Joseph Reed (disambiguation)
- Mark Reed (disambiguation)
- Paul Reed (disambiguation)
- Peter Reed (disambiguation)
- Robert Reed (disambiguation)
- Steve Reed (disambiguation)
- Tom Reed (disambiguation)
- Thomas Reed (disambiguation)
- Tracy Reed (disambiguation)
- Vivian Reed (disambiguation)
- Walter Reed (disambiguation)
- William Reed (disambiguation)
