= Reed =

Reed or Reeds may refer to:

== Science, technology, biology, and medicine ==
- Reed bird (disambiguation)
- Reed (plant), one of several tall, grass-like wetland plants of the order Poales
  - Reed pen, writing implement in use since ancient times, traditionally made of a reed plant
- Reed reaction, in chemistry
- Reed receiver, an outdated form of multi-channel signal decoding
- Reed switch, an electrical switch operated by an applied magnetic field
  - Reed relay, one or more reed switches controlled by an electromagnet
- Reed valve, restricts the flow of fluids to a single direction
- Reed (weaving), a comb like tool for beating the weft when weaving
- Reed's law, describes the utility of large networks, particularly social networks
- Reed–Solomon error correction, a systematic way of building codes that can be used to detect and correct multiple random symbol errors
- Reed–Sternberg cell, related to Hodgkin's disease

== Organizations ==
- Reed (company), offering employment-related services (UK)
- Reed and Stem, former architecture firm St. Paul, Minnesota
- Reed Arena, a sports arena in College Station, Texas
- Reed College, Portland, Oregon
  - Reed Research Reactor, a research nuclear reactor at the college
  - Reed, Portland, Oregon, the surrounding neighborhood
- Reed-Custer High School, in Braidwood, Illinois
- Reed Elsevier, a publishing company
  - Reed Construction Data
  - Reed Business Information
- Reed Exhibitions, trade fairs and convention organizing company
- Reed family, family of Mark E. Reed
- Reeds Jewelers, a U.S. retail jewelry company
- Reed High School (disambiguation)
- Reed House (disambiguation), several
- Reed Middle School (disambiguation), several
- Reed Plantation, Maine, United States
- Reed Publishing, a New Zealand publishing house
- Reed's, Inc., manufactures naturally brewed sodas, California, United States
- Records of Early English Drama (REED), a theatre research centre at the University of Toronto, Canada

== People ==
- Reed (name), a surname or given name
- Reed (surname), a list of people with the surname

== Places ==
=== Cities and towns ===
- Reed, Arkansas, United States
- Reed, Kentucky, United States
- Reed, Wisconsin, United States
- Reed City, Michigan, United States
- Reed-Cooke, a neighborhood in Washington DC, United States
- Reed Creek, Georgia, United States
- Reed, Hertfordshire, United Kingdom
- Reed, Norway
- Reeds Branch, a stream in Missouri
- Reed Point, Montana, of statistical meaning only
- Reed Plantation, Maine, United States
- Reed Township, Pennsylvania, United States

=== Historic interest ===
- Reed-Wood Place, a historic site Littleton, Massachusetts
- Reed's Creek Farm, a historic home Maryland, United States
- Reed and Barton Complex, a historic industrial complex in Taunton, Massachusetts
- Reed Gold Mine, defunct, in Midland, North Carolina
- Reed Memorial Library, Carmel, New York, United States
- Lerners Building, also known as Reed's, Los Angeles, California

== Other uses ==
- Reed Airport (disambiguation)
- Reed v. Reed, a United States Supreme Court case (Equal Protection case)
- Reed's Regiment of Militia, a military unit in the U.S. war of independence
- Reeding, the process or effect of creating "reeds" around the edges of coins, furniture, and architectural columns
- Reed (mouthpiece), the vibrating piece in woodwind musical instrument
  - Double reed
  - Quadruple reed
- Reed pipe, a type of organ pipe, as distinct from a flue pipe

== See also ==
- Read (disambiguation)
- Reid (disambiguation)
- Reed-Muller (disambiguation)
- Justice Reed (disambiguation)
