= Read (surname) =

Origin
- Meaning: literally, the colour red - descriptive of ruddy complexion or red hair
- Region of origin: England

Read is a surname of English origins.

== Derivation ==
The name is most likely to derive from rēad, the Anglo-Saxon (Old English) term for the colour red. As a name it is believed to have originally been descriptive of person's complexion or hair being ruddy or red. Old English had spelling variants depending on dialect, rēad was the form in West Saxon, rēid was the spelling characteristic of Northumbrian English. This variation is probably fossilised in the modern name variants, Read and Reid. There is a settlement in Lancashire called Read, the name deriving from an Old English term meaning roe[deer]-headland, this may also account for some Read surnames.

== Historical use ==
As a personal name a grammatical form of Read, Reada, was used at the earliest stages of English history. The English town of Reading on the River Thames derives its name from a very early English tribal or community group called the Readingas. The Readingas appear to have been named after a chieftain called Reada, "The Red One," with the addition of the element -ingas meaning "the people of." The first written use of the name is that of a Leofwine se Reade (Leofwine the Red), in the time of King Canute, dating to 1016–1020. However, this usage would have been as a descriptive by-name as inherited family surnames had not yet become established. A variant spelling is found in the person of Godwin le Rede, recorded in Norfolk in 1273, and a Thomas Read is recorded in 1327; their use of the name would have been as a heritable surname.

A Read family was prominent in early American history, George Read of Delaware was signatory to the Declaration of Independence and US Constitution.

== People with the surname ==
Note: Some people appear in multiple subsections.

=== Academics ===
- Allen Walker Read (1906–2002), American etymologist and lexicographer
- Benedict Read (1945–2016), English art historian
- Charles Read (British historian), British economic historian
- Charles Read (French historian) (1819-1898), French historian of religion
- Charles Hercules Read (1857–1929), British archaeologist and curator at the British Museum
- Conyers Read (1881–1959), American historian
- Elizabeth Fisher Read (1872–1943), American scholar and women's suffragist
- Florence M. Read (1886–1973), American college president
- Leonard Read (1898–1983), American think tank founder

=== Arts and entertainment ===
- Al Read (1909–1987), English comedian
- Anthony Read (1935–2015), English producer, scriptwriter, and author
- Daniel Read (1757–1836), American composer
- Gardner Read (1913–2005), American composer
- Herbert Read (1893–1968), English poet
- Howard Read, British comedian
- James Read (born 1953), American television actor
- Jane Maria Read (1853–?), American poet and artist
- John Dawson Read, English singer-songwriter
- Mark "Chopper" Read (1954–2013), Australian criminal and author
- Mike Read (born 1947), British disc jockey and TV presenter
- Nicholas Read (sculptor) (c. 1733–1787) English sculptor
- Piers Paul Read (born 1941), British novelist and non-fiction author
- Thomas Buchanan Read (1822–1872), American poet and painter

=== Journalism ===
- Charles Anderson Read (1841–1878), Irish journalist and writer
- Elizabeth Bunnell Read (1832–1909), American journalist and suffragist
- Opie Read (1852–1939), American journalist and humorist
- Richard Read (born 1957), American journalist

=== Military ===
- Abner Read (1821–1863), United States Navy officer
- Albert Cushing Read (1887–1967), United States Navy rear admiral and aviator
- Anketell Moutray Read (1884–1915), British Army officer and recipient of the Victoria Cross
- Antony Read (1913–2000), British Army general
- Charles Read (Medal of Honor) (1840–?), American Civil War sailor and Medal of Honor recipient
- Charles Read (naval officer) (1840–1890), U.S. and Confederate naval officer
- Charles Read (RAAF officer) (1918–2014), Royal Australian Air Force air marshal, former Chief of the Air Staff
- Charles A. Read (1837–1865), American Civil War sailor and Medal of Honor recipient
- George C. Read (1788–1862), United States Navy rear admiral
- George E. Read (1838–1910), American sailor and Medal of Honor recipient
- George Windle Read (1860–1934), United States Army major general
- George Windle Read Jr. (1900–1974), United States Army lieutenant general, son of the above
- Thomas Read (naval officer) (1740–1788), officer of the Pennsylvania Navy during the American Revolutionary War

=== Politics and government ===
- Almon Heath Read (1790–1844), lawyer and U.S. Representative from Pennsylvania
- Charles Read (Australian politician) (1814–1910)
- Charles Read (Philadelphia) (died 1736), merchant and mayor of Philadelphia
- Charles C. Reid (1868–1922), American lawyer and politician
- Earl Read III, American politician
- George Read (Alberta politician), Canadian politician and party leader
- George Read (Ontario politician) (1819–after 1874), Canadian businessman and Member of Parliament
- George Read (New Zealand politician) (1814–1878)
- George Read (American politician, born 1733) (1733–1798), lawyer, signer of the Declaration of Independence and U.S. Senator from Delaware
- George Read Jr. (1765–1836), lawyer, son of George Read, Sr., U.S. Attorney for the state of Delaware
- George Read III (1787–1836), lawyer, son of George Read, Jr., U.S. Attorney for Delaware
- George Read (New Zealand politician) (1814–1878), English-born mariner and landowner from East Coast
- Jacob Read (1752–1816), lawyer and U.S. Senator from South Carolina
- John Erskine Read (1888–1973), Canadian lawyer and international jurist
- John Kingsley Read (1937–1985), UK politician
- John Milton Read (1842–1881), American politician
- John M. Read (1797–1874), American lawyer and jurist
- Lazarus Hammond Read (c. 1815–1855), chief justice of the Supreme Court of the Utah Territory
- Mel Read, politician and member of the E.U. Parliament from the United Kingdom
- Nathan Read (1759–1849), teacher and U.S. Representative from Massachusetts
- Thomas Read (politician) (1881–1962), American politician
- William T. Read (1878–1954), lawyer, President of the New Jersey Senate, and Treasurer of New Jersey

=== Science and mathematics ===
- Charles Read (mathematician) (1958–2015), British mathematician
- Frank Read (born 1934), British physicist
- Herbert Harold Read (1889–1970), British geologist
- Jocelyn Read, Canadian 21st century physicist
- Ronald C. Read (1924–2019), British mathematician

=== Sports ===
- Aaron Read (born 1992), English motocross rider
- Alex Read (born 1991), Australian soccer player
- Bert Read (fl. 1895–1908), English footballer
- Charles Read (squash player) (fl. 1920s), English squash player
- Chris Read (born 1978), English cricketer
- Glen Read (born 1981), English cricketer
- Hopper Read (1910–2000), English cricketer
- Ian Read (1927–2020), Australian discus thrower
- Ken Read (born 1955), Canadian skier
- Kieran Read (born 1985), New Zealand rugby player
- Leilani Read (1973–1999), New Zealand and Samoan netball player
- Matt Read (born 1986), Canadian hockey player
- Maurice Read (1859–1929), English cricketer
- Nipper Read (1925–2020), British police officer and boxing administrator
- Phil Read (1939–2022), English motorcycle racer
- Reg Read (1886–1974), New Zealand cricketer
- Ron Reed (born 1942), American Major League Basketball pitcher and National Baseball Association player
- Tommy Read (1900–1956), English football goalkeeper
- Trevor Read (born 1980), Canadian ice hockey defenceman
- Walter Read (1855–1907), English cricketer

=== Other fields ===
- Alexander Read (surgeon) (1786–1870), president of the Royal College of Surgeons in Ireland
- Blue Tulip Rose Read, English stalker of Mike Read born Carol Ballard
- Carveth Read (1848–1931), British philosopher and logician
- Charles D. Read (1902–1957), New Zealand surgeon
- Charlotte Read (1929–2019), American environmental activist
- Deborah Read (1708–1774), the wife of Benjamin Franklin
- Elizabeth Read (convict) (c. 1820–1884), English-born prostitute who was transported to Australia
- Gabriel Read (1825–1894), Australian gold prospector who triggered a gold rush
- John D. Read (1814–1864), American abolitionist
- Mary Read (?–1721), English pirate
- Nick Read (born 1964), British businessman
- Ronald Read (philanthropist) (1921–2014), American philanthropist
- Ronald Kingsley Read (1887–1975) English developer of Quikscript, an alphabet
- Rory Read (born 1961), American CEO of Vonage

== In fiction ==
- Miss Read (1913–2012) was the pen name of British author Dora Jessie Saint (from her mother's maiden name)
- Mr. Read is a character in Jane Austen's final completed novel Persuasion, published in 1817

== See also ==
- Read family of Delaware
- Justice Read (disambiguation)
- Reade (name), a given name and surname
- Redd (surname)
- Reed (name)
- Reed (surname)
- Reid (disambiguation)
- Rhead
