= Read =

Read or READ may refer to:

== Computing ==
- Read (computer), to retrieve data from a storage device
- Read (system call), a low-level IO function on a file descriptor in a computer
- Read (Unix), a command in Unix operating systems

== Places ==
- Read, Lancashire, England, a village
- Read, West Virginia, United States, an unincorporated community
- Read Township, Clayton County, Iowa, United States
- Read Township, Butler County, Nebraska, United States
- Read Mountains, Coats Land, Antarctica
- Mount Read, a mountain in Tasmania, Australia
- Read Island, British Columbia, Canada

== People ==
- Read (given name)
- Read (surname)
- Miss Read (1913–2012), pen name of British author Dora Jessie Saint

== READ ==
- Reading Excellence and Discovery Foundation, a non-profit charitable organization founded in 1999
- READ Global, a non-profit organization operating in rural South Asia
- READ International, a charity that aims to improve access to education in East Africa
- Rural Educational and Development Foundation, a not-for-profit educational network in rural Pakistan
- Reading Education Assistance Dogs, an organization promoting literacy using therapy dogs

== Other uses ==
- Read (automobile), an American car manufactured from 1913 to 1915
- Read (biology), an inferred sequence of base pairs of a DNA fragment
- Read codes, a standard clinical terminology system used in General Practice in the United Kingdom
- Read Bridge, Singapore
- Read (magazine), a children's magazine
- Read School (disambiguation)
- Read (theatre), to perform the dialog of a play
- Read (transgender), a term in gender identity
- Chicago-Read Mental Health Center in Chicago, Illinois
- The Read, a weekly one-hour pop culture podcast
- Arthur Read, a fictional anthropomorphic aardvark

== See also ==
- Read's Island, Humber Estuary, England
- Reads (disambiguation)
- Reading (disambiguation)
- Reed (disambiguation)
- Reid (disambiguation)
- Redd (disambiguation)
- Red (disambiguation)
- Rede (disambiguation)
- Rhead
- Reade (disambiguation)
