= Reade =

Reade may refer to:

- Reade (name), a list of people with the surname or given name
- Frank Reade, the protagonist of a series of dime novels published primarily for boys
- Reade baronets, two extinct titles in the Baronetage of England
- Reade Township, Pennsylvania, United States
- Reade Peak, Graham Land, Antarctica

== See also ==
- Read (disambiguation)
- Reed (disambiguation)
- Reid (disambiguation)
- Reide, river in Germany
- Joan Reede, American physician
