= Rede =

Rede is an archaic word meaning, among other things, "counsel" and "advice". It is cognate with Dutch "raad", Luxembourgish "Rot", Common Scandinavian "råd", Icelandic "ráð" and German "Rat".

Rede may refer to:

== People ==
- Edward Rede (by 1476-1544), English politician
- John Rede (disambiguation)
- Miroslav Rede (born 1938), Croatian sports journalist and former (soccer) football player
- Richard Rede (died after 1416), statesman and judge in Ireland
- Robert Rede (died 1519), English Chief Justice of the Common Pleas
- Robert William Rede (1815–1904), militiaman at the centre of Eureka Rebellion in Victoria, Australia
- Thomas Rede (c. 1390–c. 1455), English merchant, landholder, knight and public official
- William Rede (disambiguation)

== Places ==
- Rede, Suffolk, England, a village
- River Rede, a river in Northumberland, England
- Réde, Hungary, a village

== Other uses ==
- Rede S.A., a Brazilian multi-brand acquirer
- Wiccan Rede, also called the Rede, a statement that provides the key moral system in the neopagan religion of Wicca and related witchcraft-based faiths
- Rede, a term in Heideger's philosophy
- Sustainability Network (Brazilian Portuguese: Rede Sustentabilidade), a Brazilian political party

== See also ==
- Alexis von Rosenberg, Baron de Redé (1922–2004), French banker, aristocrat, aesthete, collector and socialite
- Richard the Redeless
- Reed (disambiguation)
- Read (disambiguation)
- Red (disambiguation)
- Reid (disambiguation)
