= Thomas Reade =

Thomas Reade is the name of:

- Thomas Reade (royalist) (1606 – March 1669), English royalist
- Sir Thomas Reade, 4th Baronet (c. 1684–1752), British courtier and longtime Member of Parliament
- Thomas Reade (British Army officer) (1782–1849), British Napoleonic Wars officer, one of Napoleon's guards on Saint Helena and collector
- Thomas Mellard Reade (1832–1909), English geologist, architect and civil engineer

== See also ==
- Thomas Read (disambiguation)
- Thomas Reid (disambiguation)
- Thomas Reed (disambiguation)
- Thomas Rede, Welsh merchant and landowner
