= Thomas Read =

Thomas Read may refer to:

- Thomas Read (naval officer) (1740–1788), officer of the Pennsylvania Navy during the American Revolutionary War
- Thomas Buchanan Read (1822–1872), American poet and portrait painter
- Thomas Read (politician) (1881–1962), American politician in Michigan
- Thomas Herbert Bert Read (fl. 1895–1908), English footballer
- Tom Read, pseudonym of British soldier Nish Bruce
- Tommy Read, English footballer

== See also ==
- Thomas Reed (disambiguation)
- Thomas Reid (disambiguation)
- Thomas Reade (disambiguation)
- Thomas Rede, Welsh merchant and landowner
