= Peter Reid (disambiguation) =

Peter Reid (born 1956) is a football manager and former player.

Peter Reid may also refer to:

- Peter Reid (triathlete) (born 1969), Canadian triathlete
- Peter Reid (Royal Navy officer) (1903–1973)
- Peter Reid (chess player) (1910–1939), Scottish chess player and mountain climber

== See also ==
- Peter Reed (disambiguation)
- Peter Rede, MP for Dover
- Peter Read (disambiguation)
