= Red (disambiguation) =

Red is a color.

Red or RED may also refer to:

== Arts and entertainment ==
=== Comics ===
- Red (manga), 2006, by Sanae Rokuya
- Red (WildStorm), a 2003/2004 three-issue comic book mini-series
- Red (1998), a manga by Kenichi Muraeda
- Red (2007), a manga by Naoki Yamamoto

=== Fictional characters ===
- Red Forman, on the TV series That '70s Show
- Donovan "Red" Grant, in the James Bond novel From Russia, with Love and its film adaptation
- Red Green, on the TV series Smith & Smith and The Red Green Show
- Red Raymond, on the TV series Hellcats
- Raymond "Red" Reddington, on the TV series The Blacklist
- Galina "Red" Reznikov, on the TV series Orange Is the New Black
- Red, a male brachiosaurus in the animated series Dink, the Little Dinosaur
- Red, from the children's show Fraggle Rock
- Red, in the animated series Motorcity
- Red, a female student at South Park Elementary in the adult animated series South Park
- Red X, three characters in Teen Titans
- Red (Cars), a fire truck in the Pixar film Cars
- Red Puckett, in the animated film Hoodwinked! (2005), played by Anne Hathaway
- Red Redding, the narrator in Steven King's novella Rita Hayworth and Shawshank Redemption and movie The Shawshank Redemption, played by Morgan Freeman in the movie
- Red, a male sparrow in the Hungarian animated film Willy the Sparrow (1989)
- Red, a huge demon-cat posing as an elderly dog in the animated film All Dogs Go to Heaven 2 (1996)
- Princess Red of Hearts, the titular protagonist in the Disney original movie Descendants: The Rise of Red (2024)
- Red (Pokémon Adventures), a main character in the Pokémon Adventures manga
- Red Hot Riding Hood (character), in various animated shorts and Tom and Jerry movies
- Hellboy, a superhero often called Red by the people he works with
- Red (Mega Man), in the Mega Man X video game series
- Red (Pokémon), the main male playable character of Pokémon Red and Blue, the protagonist of Pokémon Origins, and the main inspiration for the anime character Ash Ketchum
- Red XIII, a feline character in the video game Final Fantasy VII
- Red, the main protagonist in the Angry Birds video game series
- Red, the protagonist of the video game Transistor
- Red Harlow, the main protagonist of the video game Red Dead Revolver (2004)
- Red, from the web series Dick Figures
- Red, Ashley's friend devil/imp from the WarioWare series
- Red, in the video game, Dragon Quest VIII
- Red, from the NES Godzilla Creepypasta

=== Films ===
- Red (film series), based on the comic-book miniseries
  - Red (2010 film), an American action-comedy
  - Red 2 (film), a 2013 American action-comedy and sequel to the 2010 film
- Red (2002 film), an Indian Tamil-language film
- Red: The Dark Side (2007), an Indian Hindi-language film
- Red (2008 film), an American thriller
- Red: Werewolf Hunter (2010), a 2010 horror film based on the tale of "Little Red Riding Hood"
- Three Colours: Red (1994), a 1994 French-Swiss-Polish film and last of Three Colors trilogy

=== Music ===
==== Groups ====
- Red (band), a Christian rock band
- Red (an orchestra), an American chamber orchestra based in Cleveland, Ohio
- Red (Canadian band), a disbanded folk rock band also known as Uisce Beatha
- Red (Dutch band) (active 2008–2010), formed via Popstars, a Dutch talent show

==== Albums ====
- Red (Taylor Swift album), 2012
  - Red (Taylor's Version), the 2021 re-recorded version
- R.E.D. (Ne-Yo album), 2012
- Red (Black Uhuru album), 1989
- Red (Datarock album), 2009
- Red (Dia Frampton album), 2011
- Red (EP), 2011, by Weekend
- Red (Guillemots album), 2008
- Red (John Stevens album), 2005
- Red (King Crimson album), 1974
- Weezer (Red Album), colloquially referred to as Red, 2008
- Red (Leslie Cheung album), 1996
- R.E.D. (Rythmes Extrêmement Dangereux), 2015
- Red (Nanase Aikawa album), 1996
- Red (Symbion Project album), 1997
- Red (T'Pau album), 1998
- R.E.D (Tiwa Savage album), 2015
- Red (The Communards album), 1987
- The R.E.D. Album, by Game
- Red, a 2003 compilation by Kelly Chen
- Red, 1998, by NaNa

==== Songs ====
- "Red" (A.S. RED), by A.S. RED
- "Red" (B'z song)
- "Red" (Elbow song)
- "Red" (Hyuna song)
- "Red" (Daniel Merriweather song)
- "Red" (Taylor Swift song)
- "Red" (The Gazette song)
- "Red" (Treble Charger song)
- "Red" (Descendants song)
- "The Red" (song), by Chevelle from Wonder What's Next
- "Red", by Sanjeeta Bhattacharya
- "Red", by Sammy Hagar from Sammy Hagar (album)
- "Red", by Catfish and the Bottlemen from The Ride (Catfish and the Bottlemen album)
- "Red", by Chris Brown from Indigo
- "Red", by Hardy from The Mockingbird & the Crow
- "Red", by XTC from Go 2
- "RED", by jnhygs with 9lives

=== Television ===
- "Red" (Dark Angel), an episode of Dark Angel
- "Red" (Smallville), an episode of Smallville
- "Red", an episode of Teletubbies
- Red, a former name of defunct Australian TV Channel Channel V Australia
- Red by HBO, a defunct movie channel

=== Other media ===
- Red (novel), 2004, by Ted Dekker
- Red (play), a 2009 drama about the painter Mark Rothko by John Logan
- Red (audio drama), a 2006 Doctor Who audio drama
- Pokémon Red, a role-playing video game
- "Reliable Excavation Demolition", a playable gaming faction in Team Fortress 2 (acronym "RED")
- Review of Economic Dynamics, a macroeconomics journal
- Red, a magazine published by Hearst

== Businesses and organizations ==
- Red Digital Cinema Camera Company
- RED Distribution, a record distributor
- Red Entertainment, a video game developer based in Japan
- Red Mobile, a defunct mobile virtual network operator in the Philippines
- La Red (Chilean TV channel), a private TV channel
- RED – 1404 AM, a university radio station for the University of Essex

== Epithets ==
- Red (political adjective), slang for communism
- Red (racial slur), slang for Native Americans in the US and First Nations in Canada

== Mascots ==
- Red (mascot), Arkansas State University mascot
- Red, a mascot for M&M's candy

== People ==
- Red (nickname)
- Amazing Red (born 1982), stage name of American professional wrestler Jonathan Figueroa
- Red Bastien (1931–2012), stage name of American professional wrestler Rolland Bastien
- Red Buttons (1919–2006), stage name of American actor and comedian born Aaron Chwatt
- Red Lane (1939–2015), stage name of American country singer-songwriter and guitarist Hollis Rudolph DeLaughter
- Red Skelton (1913–1997), stage name of American actor, comedian, and artist Richard Skelton
- Spanish Red, a female professional wrestler from the Gorgeous Ladies of Wrestling

== Places ==
- Red Barracks, Weymouth, Dorset, England
- Red Barracks, Woolwich, London, England
- Redruth railway station, Cornwall, England (national station code "RED")
- Red Creek (Mississippi), a tributary of the Pascagoula River in the US
- Red Creek, a tributary of the Dry Fork (Cheat River) in the U.S. state of West Virginia
- Red Sea, between Africa and the Arabian Peninsula

== Technology ==
- Radio Equipment Directive, an EU regulatory framework
- Red (cipher machine), a World War II Japanese cipher
- Red (programming language)
- Red (text editor), a 1980s screen editor
- Random early detection, a queue management algorithm
- Reversed electrodialysis, an energy generation process
- Reduction Equivalent Dose, a performance measure of Ultraviolet germicidal irradiation

== Other uses ==
- Product Red, an initiative to raise money for the Global Fund to Fight AIDS, Tuberculosis and Malaria
- Red (Pillow Pal), a bull toy made by Ty, Inc.
- Redfern-Eveleigh-Darlington, a redevelopment scheme in Sydney, Australia
- Red, Virgin America's in-flight environment

== See also ==
- Red Lake (disambiguation)
- Red Line (disambiguation)
- Red Mountain (disambiguation)
- Red River (disambiguation)
- Big Red (gum), a cinnamon-flavored gum made by Wrigley's
- Big Red (soft drink), a soda
- Red Bull, an energy drink brand
- Read (disambiguation)
- Redd (disambiguation)
- Reds (disambiguation)
