= Revell-Reade =

Revell-Reade is a surname. Notable people include:

- Raymond Northland Revell Reade (1861–1943), Commandant of the Royal Military College of Canada

== See also ==
- Reade (name), given name and surname
