= Ron Stainton =

English footballer (1909–1966)

Personal information
- Full name: Ronald George Stainton
- Date of birth: 10 June 1909
- Place of birth: Birmingham, England
- Date of death: 2 March 1966 (aged 56)
- Place of death: Solihull,
- Height: 5 ft 7 1/2 in (1.71 m)
- Position: Left back

Youth career
- Bournville Athletic

Senior career*
Years	Team	Apps	(Gls)
1926–1927	Bournville Athletic		
1927–1932	Birmingham	1	(0)
1932–1933	Worcester City		
1933–1934	Shrewsbury Town		
1934	Gresley Rovers		
1935	Dudley Town		
1935–1939	Shirley Town / Solihull Town		
- * Club domestic league appearances and goals

Ronald George Stainton (10 June 1909 – 2 March 1966) was an English professional footballer who played in the Football League for Birmingham. He played mainly as a left back. Stainton also played non-league football for Bournville Athletic, Worcester City, Shrewsbury Town, Gresley Rovers, Dudley Town and Shirley Town / Solihull Town.

== Life and career ==
Stainton was born in 1909 in the Bournville district of Birmingham, a son of Frank Howard Stainton, a hardware merchant's clerk, and his wife Leah née Peacock. He attended St Stephen's School, and was a member of the King's Norton Schools football team that reached the quarter-final of the English Schools' Shield in 1922–23, in which they lost to the eventual runners-up, Birmingham Schools, in front of a 6,000 crowd at St Andrew's. Stainton was selected for the schoolboy international against Scotland in May 1923 at Hampden Park, a match which England lost 5–3.

Stainton played youth football for Bournville Athletic, and came into the senior side in August 1926. He played for Birmingham's Central League side as an amateur in the 1926–27 season, and signed professional forms in the 1927 close season. The 18-year-old Stainton made his first-team debut on 1 October 1927 in a 1–1 draw at home to Bolton Wanderers in the Football League First Division. He was selected "in the hope that he would strengthen what has been a position of weakness", but his inexperience showed, and the Birmingham Gazette's reporter felt he needed "a lot more coaching" before he could expect a regular place in the side.

He played for the reserves in the Central League and for the "A" team in the Birmingham Combination, but made no more first-team appearances. He was eventually listed for transfer in 1932, and after two months, was given a free transfer. Stainton had trained as a carpenter, and joined Worcester City in part because he found a suitable employer in the area. Stainton helped Worcester finish as runners-up in the Birmingham & District League, and then moved on to another Birmingham League club, Shrewsbury Town, for 1933–34. He appeared for clubs including Gresley Rovers and Dudley Town in 1934–35, before moving to Shirley, Solihull, where he played for Shirley Town and was reinstated as an amateur. The club renamed itself Solihull Town in 1938, and Stainton was captain in 1938–39.

In April 1939, by which time he had established himself in the building trade in Solihull – the 1939 Register lists him as managing director of a building contractors – Stainton stood for election to the urban district council as an independent, but lost out to the residents' association candidates. During the war, Stainton played football for Moor Green and was actively involved with the physical fitness of the local Air Training Corps.

Stainton married Jessie Strother at St Stephen's Church, Selly Park, in October 1932. They had two children, Maureen and John. Stainton and Jessie were living in Shirley at the time of his death in 1966 at the age of 56; she died the following year.
