= Red (nickname) =

Red is a nickname of the following people:

== Arts and entertainment ==
- Red Allen (1906–1967), American jazz trumpeter
- Red Allen (bluegrass) (1930–1993), American bluegrass singer and guitarist
- Red Balaban (1929–2013), American jazz tubist
- Don "Red" Barry (1912–1980), American actor
- Red Buttons (1919–2006), American actor, songwriter, and comedian
- Red Callender (1916–1992), American jazz tubist and double-bassist
- Red Canzian (born 1951), Italian rock singer-songwriter and bassist
- Red Coffey (1923–1988), American voice actor and comedian
- Red Foley (1910–1968), American country music singer and musician
- Red Garland (1923–1984), American jazz pianist
- Red Gerard (born 2000), American snowboarder
- Red Grammer (born 1952), American folk singer-songwriter and guitarist
- Red Grooms (born 1937), American artist
- Mick Hucknall (born 1960), English singer and songwriter
- Red Ingle (1906–1965), American comedy musician
- Creadel "Red" Jones (1940–1994), American soul singer and musician
- Red Kelly (musician) (1927–2004), American jazz double-bassist
- Red Lane (1939–2015), American country music singer-songwriter
- Red Mack (musician) (1912–1993), American jazz trumpeter
- Red Miller (singer) (1914–1987), American R&B singer
- Red Mitchell (1927–1992), American jazz double-bassist, composer, lyricist and poet
- Red Murrell (1921–2001), American Western swing musician
- Red Nichols (1905–1965), American jazz cornettist
- Red Norvo (1908–1999), American jazz vibraphonist
- Red Perkins (1890–1976), American jazz trumpeter
- Red Perkins (country singer) (1920–1990), American country singer-songwriter
- Red Prysock (1926–1993), American rhythm and blues saxophonist
- Red Richards (1912–1998), American jazz pianist
- Red Rodney (1927–1994), American jazz trumpet player
- Red Shea (guitarist) (1938–2008), Canadian folk guitarist
- Red Simpson (1934–2016), American country singer-songwriter
- Red Skelton (1913–1997), American comedian and artist
- Arthur Lee "Red" Smiley (1925–1972), American country and bluegrass musician
- Red Sovine (1917–1980), American country singer-songwriter
- Red Symons (born 1949), Australian television entertainer and former musician with the Skyhooks
- Red West (1936–2017), American actor, stunt performer, and songwriter
- Red Wilson (musician) (1920–2005), American fiddler

== Sports ==
Sports commentators and writers are listed in the media section.

- Red Adams (1921–2017), American baseball player, scout and coach
- Red Ames (1882–1936), American baseball pitcher
- Red Amick (1929–1995), American racing driver
- Jerry Anderson (American football coach) (born 1945), American football player and coach
- Red Anderson (baseball) (1912–1972), American baseball pitcher
- Red Anderson (ice hockey) (1910–1991), Canadian ice hockey player
- Red Armstrong (1938–1974), Canadian professional ice hockey player
- Red Auerbach (1917–2006), American basketball coach and executive
- Red Baldwin (1894–1956), American baseball player
- Red Ballantyne, Scottish footballer
- Red Barnes (1904–1959), American baseball player
- Red Barron (1900–1982), American football and baseball player
- Red Bastien (1931–2012), American professional wrestler
- Red Baughman (1878–1958), American football coach
- Red Berenson (born 1939), Canadian ice hockey player and coach
- Red Berry (wrestler) (1906–1973), American professional wrestler
- Red Bethea (1905–1986), American football player
- Red Bittmann (1862–1929), American baseball player and umpire
- Earl Blaik (1897–1989), American football player and coach, college athletics administrator and Army officer
- Red Borom (1915–2011), American baseball player
- Red Bowser (1881–1943), American baseball player
- Red Bryant (born 1984), American football player
- Red Byron (1915–1960), American racing driver
- Chris Cagle (American football) (1905–1942), American football player
- Howie Camp (1893–1960), American baseball player
- Red Cashion (1931–2019), American football official
- Red Causey (1893–1960), American baseball pitcher
- Red Conkright (1914–1980), American football player and coach
- Red Connally (1863–1896), American baseball player
- Red Corriden (1887–1959), American baseball player, coach, and manager
- Red Corzine (1909–2003), American football player
- Red Davis (1915–2002), American baseball player and manager
- Red Davis (American football) (1907–1988), American football player
- Red Davis (basketball) (born 1932), American basketball player
- Red Dawson (1906–1983), American football coach
- Bert Daykin (1888–1955), Australian rules footballer
- Forrest DeBernardi (1899–1970), American basketball player
- Red Dehnert (1924–1984), American basketball player
- Louis "Red" Deutsch (1890–1983), Ukrainian-American boxer, tavern owner, victim of the Tube Bar prank calls
- Red Donahue (1873–1913), American baseball pitcher
- Red Dooin (1879–1952), American baseball player and manager
- Red Dunn (1901–1957), American football player
- Red Dutton (1897–1987), Canadian ice hockey player, coach, and executive
- Red Edwards (1904–1981), American football player and coach
- Red Ehret (1868–1940), American baseball pitcher
- Red Faber (1888–1976), American baseball pitcher
- Red Fisher (baseball) (1887–1940), American baseball player
- Red Flaherty (1917–1999), American baseball umpire
- Red Gerard (born 2000), American snowboarder
- Don Goldstein (born c. 1937–2022), American basketball player
- Red Grange (1903–1991), American football player
- Percy W. Griffiths (1893–1983), American football player, coach, and politician
- Red Hardy (1923–2003), American baseball pitcher
- Red Harris (1892–1953),American football player and coach
- Red Hayworth (1916–2006), American baseball player, manager, coach, and scout
- Lloyd Hittle (1924–2012), American baseball pitcher
- Red Holzman (1920–1998), American basketball player and coach
- Red Howard (1900–1973), American football player
- Red Jones (American football), college football player
- Red Jones (outfielder) (1911–1974), American baseball player
- Red Jones (umpire) (1905–1987), American baseball umpire
- Red Kelly (1927–2019), Canadian ice hockey player and coach
- Red Kelly (baseball) (1884–1961), American baseball player
- Johnny Kerr (1932–2009), American basketball player, coach, and broadcaster
- Red Klotz (1920–2014), American basketball player and team owner
- Red Kress (1907–1962), American baseball player and coach
- Milton Leathers (1908–2000), American college football player
- Buddy Lively (1925–2015), American baseball pitcher
- Red Long (1876–1929), American baseball pitcher
- Red Mack (1937–2021), American football player
- Ralph Maddox (1908–1944), American college football player
- Red Martin (1938–2017), American ice hockey player
- Red Matal (1911–2003), American football player and coach
- Red McCusker (1895–1979), Canadian ice hockey goaltender
- Red McDermott (1888–1964), American baseball player
- Red McKee (1890–1972), American baseball player
- Red McManus (1925–2013), American basketball coach
- Red McMillan, 1920s Scottish footballer
- Red McNeal, 1930s American baseball player
- Red Mihalik (1916–1996), American basketball player and referee
- Red Miller (1927–2017), American football coach
- Red Miller (baseball) (1897–1973), American baseball pitcher
- Red Mitchell (ice hockey) (1912–1984), Canadian ice hockey player
- Red Morgan (American football) (born 2006), American football player
- Red Murdock (born 2003), American football player
- Red Murff (1921–2008), American baseball pitcher
- Red Murray (1884–1958), American baseball player
- Red Murrell (basketball) (1933–2017), American basketball player
- Red O'Connor, 1920s American football player
- Red O'Hora, American baseball player and coach
- Red O'Quinn (1925–2002), American football player
- Red Oldham (1893–1961), American baseball pitcher
- Red Ormsby (1895–1962), American baseball umpire
- Red Ostergard (1896–1977), American baseball player
- Red Owens (1925–1988), American basketball player
- Red Owens (baseball) (1874–1952), American baseball player
- Red Patterson (born 1987), American baseball pitcher
- Warren Perkins (1922–2014), American basketball player
- Red Pollard (1909–1981), Canadian horse racing jockey
- Red Ramsey (1911–1984), American football player
- Red Reese (1899–1974), American multi-sport coach and athletic director
- Red Rocha (1923–2010), American basketball player and coach
- Red Rolfe (1908–1969), American baseball player, manager and executive
- Red Ruffing (1905–1986), American baseball pitcher
- Red Ryan (baseball) (1897–1969), American baseball pitcher
- Red Sanders (1905–1958), American college football coach
- Red Schillings (1900–1954), American baseball pitcher
- Red Schoendienst (1923–2018), American baseball player and manager
- Red Shannon (1897–1970), American baseball player
- Red Shea (1898–1981), American baseball pitcher
- Red Sheridan (1896–1975), American baseball player
- Red Shurtliffe (1907–1986), American football player
- Red Smith (American football) (fl. 1903–1905), American football player
- Red Smith (American football/baseball) (1904–1978), American baseball and football player and coach
- Red Smith (catcher) (1892–1970), American baseball player
- Red Smith (shortstop) (1899–1961), American baseball player
- Red Smith (third baseman) (1890–1966), American baseball player
- Red Snapp (1888–1974), American baseball player and manager
- Red Steiner (1915–2001), American baseball player
- Red Storey (1918–2006), Canadian ice hockey official
- Red Thomas (1898–1962), American baseball player
- Red Torkelson (1894–1964), American baseball pitcher
- Red Weaver (1897–1968), American football player and coach
- Red Werder (1894–1942), American football player
- Red Wilson (1929–2014), American baseball and football player
- Shirley Wilson (1925–2021), American football coach
- Al Wingo (1898–1964), American baseball player
- Al Worthington (1929–2026), American baseball player

== Military ==
- Roy Alexander Gano (1902–1971), US Navy vice admiral
- William Hicks Jackson (1835–1903), Confederate general during the American Civil War
- Lawson P. Ramage (1909–1990), US Navy vice-admiral and Medal of Honor recipient
- Eugene Tobin (1917–1941), WWII American fighter pilot with Royal Air Force
- Leonard F. Wing (1893–1945), US Army major and general politician

== Politics ==
- Red Berry (Texas politician) (1899–1969), American politician and gambler
- H. A. Boucher (1921–2009), American politician
- Ken Livingstone (born 1945), English politician
- Leonard F. Wing (1893–1945), American politician and US Army major general

== Media ==
- Red Barber (1908–1992), American sportscaster
- Charles "Red" Donley (1923–1998), American sports and news anchor
- Red Fisher (sportsman) (1914–2006), American sporting goods retailer, newspaper columnist, and television personality in Canada
- Red Fisher (journalist) (1926–2018), Canadian sports columnist
- Red Foley (sportswriter) (1928–2008), American sportswriter and official scorer for Major League Baseball
- Red Rush (1927–2009), American sportscaster
- Red Smith (sportswriter) (1905–1982), American sportswriter

== Other ==
- Red Adair (1915–2004), American oil field firefighter
- Red Cavaney (born 1943), American businessman and lobbyist
- Paul "Red" Dorfman, American mobster
- James "Red" Duke (1928–2015), American trauma surgeon
- Roscoe Jackson (1901–1937), American murderer, last person to be publicly executed in the United States
- Red McCombs (1927–2023), American businessman
- Red Dillard Morrison (1919–1989), American mob boss
- Harold Arthur Poling (1925–2012), American business executive
- Lynton Wilson (born 1940), Canadian business executive

== See also ==
- List of people known as the Red
- Danny Lopez (boxer) (born 1952), American boxer nicknamed "Little Red", Ernie Lopez's younger brother
- Ernie Lopez (1945–2009), American boxer nicknamed "Indian Red"
- Red Legs Greaves, British pirate fugitive whose existence is disputed
- Read (surname)
- Redd (given name)
- Redd (surname)
- Reddy (surname)
- Steve Smith (comedian) (born 1945), Canadian actor and comedian who performs as "Red Green"
