= Caroline Palavicino-Maggio =

American neuroscientist

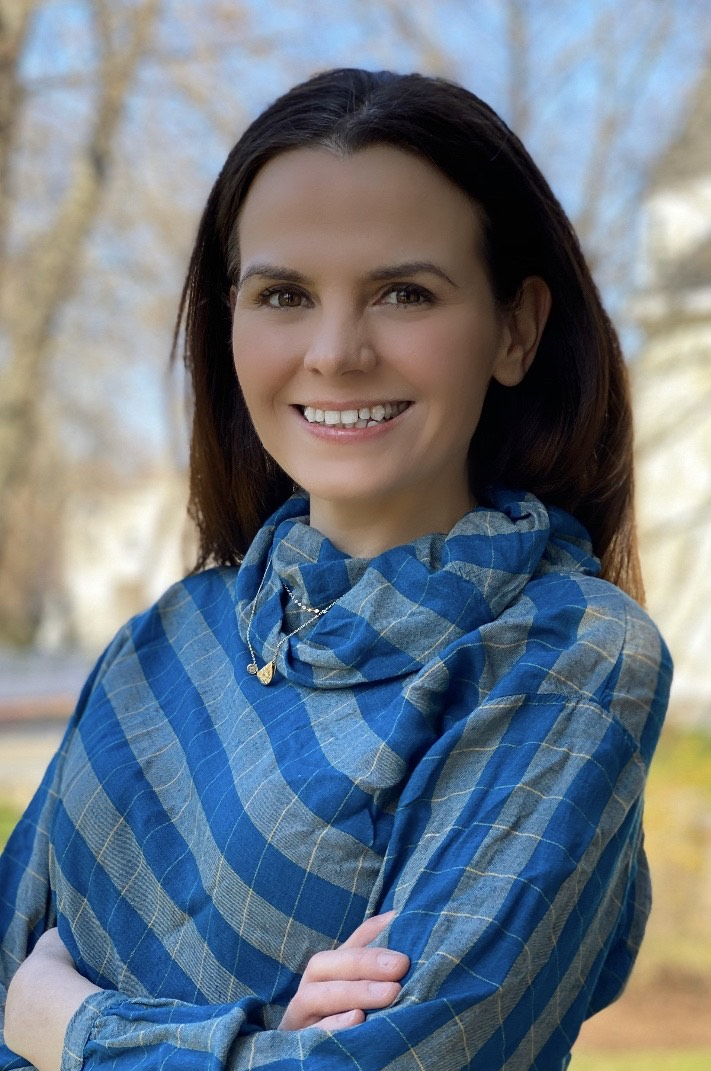
- Born: January 30; Harlem, New York U.S.
- Education: Rider College; Rutgers University at New Jersey Medical School; Harvard Medical School
- Known for: Neural circuits underlying aggression in female Drosophila
- Scientific career
- Fields: Neuroscience
- Workplaces: Harvard Medical School

Caroline Palavicino-Maggio is an American neuroscientist and an Assistant Professor of Psychiatry at Harvard Medical School. She also directs the Neurobiological Mechanisms of Aggression Laboratory at McLean Hospital. Palavicino-Maggio explores how gene expression in amine neurons and neural circuits leads to changes in social behavior, specifically aggression. Palavicino-Maggio is committed to mentoring and inspiring first-generation students in STEM and serves as the Director of Outreach for the Journal of Emerging Investigators, an open-access journal that publishes research conducted by middle and high school students as a means to expose young and underrepresented future scientists to academic research and the publishing process.

== Early life and education ==
Palavicino-Maggio was born in Harlem and grew up in Washington Heights in New York City. Her mother was an immigrant from the Caribbean region of Colombia and her father, a Mapuche descendant, was an immigrant from Chile. Palavicino-Maggio's family eventually moved across the river to a small factory town in New Jersey called Edgewater where her mother worked in a factory and her father worked for the New York City Housing Authority as an elevator mechanic.

When Palavicino-Maggio was 13 years old, her sister died by suicide. This life-altering tragedy motivated Palavicino-Maggio to focus her career on studying aggression through the lens of neuroscience and behavior. Having also experienced violent crimes in her neighborhoods growing up, this further sparked her interest in researching the neurobiology behind aggression. Palavicino-Maggio's work is focused on making significant contributions to the fields of criminal psychology and law, with the goal of driving positive societal change by deepening our understanding of how the brain drives behavior.

In 2002, Palavicino-Maggio received a BSc in Biopsychology and Political Sociology from Rider University in Lawrenceville, New Jersey. From 2002 to 2008, she worked as a research assistant at Rockefeller University and Columbia University. During this time, Palavicino-Maggio had the opportunity to present her research at the Society for Neuroscience conference, and on her way there sat next to Nick Ingolglia, the Associate Dean of New Jersey Medical School at Rutgers University and he encouraged her to pursue graduate education.

In 2009, Palavicino-Maggio began her graduate degree at Rutgers University at New Jersey Medical School in the Department of Pharmacology and Physiology. Under the mentorship of Andrew Thomas and Eldo Kuzhikandathil, Palavicino-Maggio focused her graduate work in looking at the effects of neuropsychiatric drugs on weight gain. One of the many reasons that patients stop taking medication to treat mental illness is due to side effects like weight gain. Understanding how these side effects manifest as a means to find ways to alleviate them may help with patient compliance, health, and wellbeing. Palavicino-Maggio hypothesized that antipsychotics modulate fructose absorption in the intestine by affecting GLUT5 function, a transporter for fructose, and thus contributing to weight gain. Palavicino-Maggio found that clozapine, a typical antipsychotic, induced weight gain in mice and increased fructose uptake by the intestinal GLUT5 transporter though it did not increase expression of the transporter. They further found this transporter to be essential for antipsychotic induced weight gain. Interestingly, clozapine also seemed to slow blood glucose lowering and protein lipogenesis. Palavicino-Maggio graduated with a PhD in Neuropharmacology and Neurophysiology in 2013 and her thesis was titled "Effect of Antipsychotics on the Enteric Nervous System: Implications for Weight Gain". She dedicated her thesis dissertation, "To my late sister Angie, without her unconditional love and belief in my potential to be great someday, I know I would never have steered to be where I am today".

== Career ==
Palavicino-Maggio was eager to continue in academia and pursued her postdoctoral work at Harvard Medical School in 2016. Before starting in the lab, Palavicino-Maggio took a Cold Spring Harbor Laboratory course in Drosophila Neurobiology: Genes, Circuits and Behavior to prepare to work under the mentorship of Edward Kravitz at Harvard studying aggression in drosophila.

Palavicino-Maggio's work explores the function and cellular localization of proteins in Drosophila melanogaster, fruit flies, that correlate to hyper-aggressive phenotypes. By understanding the neural substrates for aggression in model organisms, Palavicino-Maggio's research sets the stage for a better understanding of how these genes drive aggressive behaviors and how they could be targeted therapeutically in patients with neuropsychiatric disorders.

Palavicino-Maggio has explored patterns in aggressive behavior in two different species of Drosophila and found that Drosophila from cooler microclimates showed more aggression and more successful courtship behavior compared to the Drosophila from the warmer climate. This research set the stage for Palavicino-Maggio to explore the biological basis of aggression, work that was published in the Proceedings of the National Academy of Sciences in 2019. Palavicino-Maggio and her team narrowed in on the question of which neural circuits govern aggression in female flies and if this circuit is important in the expression of aggressive behavior in male flies. While it is often thought that males are more aggressive than females in most species, Palavicino-Maggio and her colleagues saw quite the opposite when they screened for aggressive behaviors in fly lines using Drosophila Flylight Gal4. They found that the GMR26E01-Gal4 line had extremely aggressive females, but males with normal aggressive behavior. Furthermore, the fights that the females engaged in, ended in hierarchical social relationships among the flies. They then tried to focus on which subpopulation of neurons were responsible for driving this behavior and they found 2–4 pairs of neurons in the female brain pC1 region that were cholinergic and weakly GABAergic that seemed to drive the aggressive behavior in females, but did not exist in males. The fascinating finding that such a small populations of neurons can drive specific and intense behavioral outputs will serve as a critical tool and model to understand how exactly interactions between neurons drive complex behaviors and provide a stepping stone for translation into more complex models of social behavior.

== Advocacy and Service ==
Palavicino-Maggio is a leading advocate for diversity, equity, and inclusion in her scientific community. She serves on multiple committees within Harvard's Office for Diversity, Inclusion, and Community Partnership, and is a consultant for the Health Professions Recruitment and Exposure Program at Harvard Medical School.

Journal of Emerging Investigators, where Palavicino-Maggio holds the title Director of Outreach, is an open-access journal that publishes research conducted by middle and high school students as a means to expose young and underrepresented future scientists to academic research and the publishing process. As the Director of Outreach, Palavicino-Maggio helps to recruit submissions from students around the world, specifically Central America, South America, and Africa. One of the projects she has been working on with students from the Boston community focuses on exploring the prevalence of antibiotic resistant bacteria around Boston. Palavicino-Maggio and her students found that of all of the colonies they grew from water fountains, traffic lights, phones, sneakers, and the Harvard T-station, only the Harvard T-station showed signs of resistant bacteria as bacterial cultures grew in the presence of ampicillin.

Within the Office of Diversity, Inclusion, and Community Partnership at Harvard, Palavicino-Maggio is involved in the Diversity Pipeline of Community Engagement Committee as well as the Equity, Inclusion, and Social Justice Committee, both led by Dean Joan Reede. As a committee member, Palavicino-Maggio offers suggestions and recommendations for dialogues/events and concerns related to social justice and best practices to equip underrepresented high school students with the proper skill sets and knowledge to succeed in STEM fields, especially in the biosciences.

Palavicino-Maggio is also engaged in diplomacy work to bridge community and scientific connections between American and Cuban Scientists. As a part of these efforts, Palavicino-Maggio was able to host Enrique Beldarrain Chaple, the Chief of Research Department, the National Information Center of Medical Sciences and Professor of Public Health and History of Medicine at the National School of Public Health in Havana, Cuba.

== Awards and honors ==
- 1998: Eleanor Humanitarian Award
- 1998: Unilever Research, U.S., Scholarship Recipient
- 2008: Rutgers University, Honor Society for Research Scholars
- 2008: Alfred P. Sloan Foundation, Pre-doctoral Sloan Scholar
- 2011: NIMH Independent Research Grant - Effects of Atypical Antipsychotics on Fructose Metabolism and Weight Gain
- 2012: New York Academy of Sciences with PepsiCo, R&D Young Scientist Award
- 2016: Harvard Medical School, Society for Translational and Academic Researcher Fellow

== Selected works and publication ==
- Palavicino-Maggio, Caroline B.; Kuzhikandathil, Eldo V. (September 2016). "Dietary Fructose and GLUT5 Transporter Activity Contribute to Antipsychotic-Induced Weight Gain". Schizophrenia Bulletin. 42 (5): 1270–1279. doi:10.1093/SCHBUL/SBW037. PMC 4988743. PMID 27056716. Wikidata ()
- Palavicino-Maggio, Caroline B.; Trannoy, Séverine; Holton, Kristina M.; Song, Xiaoying; Li, Kexin; Nevo, Eviatar (11 March 2019). "Aggression and courtship differences found in Drosophila melanogaster from two different microclimates at Evolution Canyon, Israel". Scientific Reports. 9 (1): 4084. Bibcode:2019NatSR...9.4084P. doi:10.1038/s41598-019-40701-8. PMC 6411990. PMID 30858499. Wikidata ()
- Palavicino-Maggio, Caroline B.; Chan, Yick-Bun; McKellar, Claire; Kravitz, Edward A. (20 August 2019). "A small number of cholinergic neurons mediate hyperaggression in female Drosophila" (PDF). Proceedings of the National Academy of Sciences. 116 (34): 17029–17038. Bibcode:2019PNAS..11617029P. doi:10.1073/pnas.1907042116. PMC 6708353. PMID 31391301.
