= Peter Read =

Peter Read may refer to:

- Peter Read (boxer) (born 1936), Australian Olympic boxer
- Peter Read (historian) (born 1945), professor at the Australian National University, the first to use the phrase "stolen generation"
- Peter Read, music magazine publisher, see music of Arkansas

== See also ==
- Peter Reade (born 1939), British former sailor
- Peter Reed (disambiguation)
- Peter Reid (disambiguation)
