= Redd (given name) =

Redd is a masculine given name, and may refer to:

- Redd Boggs (1921–1996), American writer
- Redd Foxx (1922–1991), American actor and comedian
- Redd Holt (1932–2003), American jazz drummer
- Redd Pepper (born 1961), Barbadian-British voice actor
- Redd Stewart (1923–2003), American songwriter
- Redd Volkaert (born 1958), Canadian musician
- Redd Evans (1912-1972), American songwriter

== See also ==
- Red (nickname)
- Read (surname)
- Redd (surname)
- Redd (disambiguation)
