= Thomas Reid (disambiguation) =

Thomas Reid (1710–1796) was a Scottish philosopher.

Thomas or Tom Reid may also refer to:

- Sir Thomas Reid, 1st Baronet (1762–1824), Scottish businessman, director and governor of East India Co.
- Thomas Mayne Reid (1818–1883), Irish-American novelist
- Tommy Reid (footballer) (1905–1972), Scottish footballer
- Tommy Reid (pastor), American evangelist
- Thomas Reid (British politician) (1881–1963), member of parliament for Swindon, 1945–1955
- Thomas Reid (naval surgeon) (1791–1825), Irish born Royal naval surgeon and prison reformer
- Thomas Reid, founder of Falmouth, Jamaica
- Thomas Wemyss Reid (1842–1905), British newspaper editor, novelist and biographer
- Tom Reid (rugby league), New Zealand international
- Tom Reid (ice hockey) (born 1946), American ice hockey player
- Tom Reid (footballer, born 1901) (1901–?), English soccer player
- Thomas Reid (Canadian politician) (1886–1968), Canadian businessman and politician in the province of British Columbia
- Thomas Reid (humanist) (died 1624), Scottish humanist and philosopher
- Thomas M. Reid (born 1966), American author and game designer
- T. R. Reid (Thomas Roy Reid) (born 1943), American reporter, documentary film correspondent, and author
- Tom Reid (rugby union) (1926–1996), Irish rugby union player
- Tom Reid (electrical engineer) (1927–2010), involved in Apollo program
- Thomas R. Reid (1839–1917), American politician
- Thomas Reid (born 1962), Irish farmer, subject of the documentary film The Lonely Battle of Thomas Reid
- T. B. W. Reid (Thomas Bertram Wallace Reid, 1901–1981), British Romance philologist
- T. J. Reid (Thomas Joseph Reid), Irish hurler
- T. Patrick Reid, businessman and politician in Ontario, Canada

== See also ==
- Thomas Reed (disambiguation)
- Thomas Read (disambiguation)
- Thomas Reade (disambiguation)
