= Joseph Read (disambiguation) =

Joseph Read (1732–1801) was an American soldier and officer.

Joseph Read or Joe Read may also refer to:

- Joseph Read (Canadian politician) (1849–1919), merchant, ship owner, and legislator on Prince Edward Island
- Joe Read, member of the Montana House of Representatives from 2011 to 2013

== See also ==
- Joseph Reade (disambiguation)
- Joseph Reid (disambiguation)
- Joseph Reed (disambiguation)
