= Red Lake =

Red Lake may refer to:

== Lakes ==
=== Australia ===
- Red Lake (Western Australia), ephemeral salt lake in the outback of Western Australia
- Red Lake, Western Australia, abandoned town in the Shire of Esperance

=== Croatia ===
- Red Lake (Croatia) (Crveno jezero)

=== Romania ===
- Red Lake (Romania) (Lacul Roşu)

=== United States ===
- Red Lake (Arizona–New Mexico)
- Red Lake (Orlando), Florida
- Red Lake (Minnesota), the largest lake entirely within the state
- Red Lake (New York)
- Red Lake (Douglas County, Wisconsin)

== Other places ==
=== Canada ===
- Red Lake, Ontario

=== United States ===
- Red Lake, Arizona, a census-designated place
- Red Lake Peak, a summit of the Sierra Nevada mountains in California
- Red Lake, Minnesota, a census-designated place
- Red Lake County, Minnesota
- Red Lake Indian Reservation, Minnesota
- Red Lake Senior High School, Minnesota
  - Red Lake shootings, a series of shootings in 2005
- Red Lake River in Minnesota
- Lower Red Lake, Minnesota, an unorganized territory
- Upper Red Lake, Minnesota, an unorganized territory
- Red Lake Township, Logan County, North Dakota

== See also ==
- Bolshoy Bagan, in Russia
- Kyzyltuz (Akkuly District), Kazakhstan
- Lake Chervonoye, in Belarus
- Raudvatnet, in Norway
- Rotsee, in Switzerland
- Red Lake Falls (disambiguation)
