= Redd (surname) =

Redd is a surname. Notable people with the surname include:

- Chris Redd (born 1985), American stand-up comedian and actor
- Chuck Redd (born 1958), American drummer
- Dana Redd (born 1968), American politician
- Freddie Redd (1928–2021), American pianist
- Glen Redd (1958–2007), American football player
- Henry Redd (1895–1960), American football coach
- James Redd (born 1942), American football coach
- Jasper Redd (born 1979), American comedian
- Jeff Redd (21st century), American singer
- John Scott Redd (born 1944), United States Navy admiral
- Lambert Redd (1908–1986), American athlete
- Marie Redd (21st century), American politician
- Michael Redd (born 1979), American basketball player
- Nancy Redd (born 1981), American model
- Sharon Redd (1945–1992), American singer
- Shawty Redd (born 1981), American record producer
- Shirley Ann Redd (born 1937), also known as Shirley A. R. Lewis, American educator, academic administrator
- Veronica Redd (born 1948), American actress
- Vince Redd (born 1985), American football player
- William Redd, also known as Si Redd (1911-2003), American businessman and philanthropist
- Wilmot Redd (17th century), American woman executed at the Salem witch trials

== See also ==
- Redd (disambiguation)
- Redd (given name)
- Read (surname)
- Red (nickname)
