= Joseph Reade =

Joseph Reade may refer to:

- Joseph Reade (politician) (1694–1771), American vestryman and politician
- Joseph Bancroft Reade (1801–1870), English clergyman and early photographer

== See also ==
- Joseph Read (disambiguation)
