= The Death of Parcy Reed =

Traditional song

The Death of Parcy Reed is a Border ballad concerning the betrayal and murder of Percival Reed, believed to have been Laird of Troughend in Redesdale, Northumberland, in late 16th century England. It is Child ballad number 193 and its Roud number is 335.

The ballad is a classic story of the Border Reivers, and tells of an alliance between the Hall family of Redesdale and the Crosier family of Liddesdale in Scotland, against the Reeds. Percival Reed held the office of Keeper of Redesdale, and had arrested a Crosier for raiding in the valley. This put the Reeds at feud with the Crosier family. The Halls, old friends of Percy Reed, turned against him and conspired with the Crosiers to trap him while he was out hunting. When the Crosiers ambushed Percy, the Halls stood by and watched as he was murdered.

In local tradition, Percy Reed's ghost is said to have haunted Redesdale for many years, and "at times he would come gallantly cantering across the moorland as he had done when blood ran warm in his veins. ...And yet, again, he would come as a fluttering, homeless soul, whimpering and formless, with a moaning cry for Justice-Justice-Judgment on him who had by black treachery hurried him unprepared to his end."

== Synopsis ==
Parcy Reed arrests the reiving outlaw Whinton Crosier. The Crosier clan then vows to destroy the house and lands of Troughend in revenge.

Parcy Reed goes hunting with three Halls, who are neighbors and friends from nearby Girsonfield. Unknown to Parcy Reed, the Halls have forged an alliance with the Crosiers to betray him.

After hunting throughout the day “all Reedwater round”, the hunting party stops to rest at Batinghope, where Parcy Reed falls fast asleep. While he is asleep, the three “false Halls” steal his powder horn, pour water into the barrel of his gun, wedge his sword in its sheath, and remove the bridle from his horse, thus depriving Parcy of the means to either fight or flee.

When the Crosier clan is seen galloping over the hill, the Halls awaken Parcy and inform him of the danger. Parcy appeals to the Halls to stand with him, saying, “If they be five men, we are four. If ye will all stand true to me, now every one of you may take one, and two of them ye may leave to me.”

The Halls refuse to assist him in the fight, for they will surely be killed, they say. Parcy successively offers them his horse, his oxen, half his land, and ultimately the hand of his daughter if they will stand with him in the coming fight, but each Hall refuses in turn. Parcy then discovers their treachery in sabotaging his horse and weapons, and resigns himself to his fate.

Without time for Parcy to even utter a prayer, the Crosiers close around him while the Halls stand by. Parcy makes a gallant fight of it and lashes out with his sword, still jammed in its sheath. Though he knocks one of the Crosiers to the ground, the rest of them strike, mangling him cruelly and leaving him with thirty-three wounds. After hacking off his hands and feet, they ride off leaving him lying on the ground.

At dusk, a herdsman finds the dying Parcy and recognizes him. Parcy asks for a drink of water, and the herdsman procures it from a nearby spring, using his hat as a cup. Parcy asks for one more favor: to bear his farewells to his wife and kin at Troughend, and to tell all his faithful neighbors about the deeds of the “treacherous Halls”.

== Recordings ==
English folk singer Graham Pirt recorded a version of this song on the compilation album Fyre and Sworde: Songs of the Border Reivers, in 2000.
