= Judge Reed =

Judge Reed may refer to:

- Edward Cornelius Reed Jr. (1924–2013), judge of the United States District Court for the District of Nevada
- Henry Thomas Reed (1846–1924), judge of the United States District Court for the Northern District of Iowa
- James Hay Reed (1853–1927), judge of the United States District Court for the Western District of Pennsylvania
- John A. Reed Jr. (1931–2015), judge of the United States District Court for the Middle District of Florida
- Lowell A. Reed Jr. (1930–2020), judge of the United States District Court for the Eastern District of Pennsylvania
- Scott Elgin Reed (1921–1994), judge of the United States District Court for the Eastern District of Kentucky

== See also ==
- Inez Smith Reid (born 1937), judge of the District of Columbia Court of Appeals
- Justice Reed (disambiguation)
