= Reds =

Reds may refer to:

== General ==
- Red (political adjective), supporters of Communism or socialism
- Reds (film), a 1981 American film starring and directed by Warren Beatty
- Reds (January Uprising), a faction of the Polish insurrectionists during the January Uprising in 1863
- USSR (or, to a lesser extent, China) during the Cold War by many US newspapers
- Secobarbital, a barbiturate derivative drug
- Red Arrows or The Reds, the Royal Air Force's aerobatics display team
- Reds Bassman (1913–2010), American football player

== Sports teams ==
=== Officially known as the Reds ===
- Adelaide United FC, a professional soccer team based in Adelaide, Australia
- Cincinnati Reds, a Major League Baseball team
- Queensland Reds, a professional rugby union team based in Brisbane, Australia
- Salford Reds, now Salford Red Devils, a professional rugby league team based in Salford, England
- Sarasota Reds, a single-A baseball affiliate of the Cincinnati Reds
- WA Reds, a professional rugby league team based in Perth, Western Australia

=== Unofficially known as the Reds ===
- Aberdeen F.C.
- Barnsley F.C.
- FC Bayern Munich (Die Roten)
- Canada men's national soccer team (usually in French as "Les Rouges")
- Cliftonville F.C.
- CSKA Sofia (Chervenite)
- Hannover 96 (Die Roten)
- Hyde United F.C.
- Liverpool F.C.
- Manchester United F.C. (usually as Red Devils)
- Nottingham Forest F.C.
- Persepolis F.C. (Sorkhpoushan)
- Shelbourne F.C.
- S.L. Benfica (Encarnados)
- South Korea national football team
- Sport Club Internacional, known as The Red (Colorado)
- Standard Liège (Les Rouges)
- Toronto FC
- Urawa Red Diamonds, a football team based in Saitama, Japan
- Workington A.F.C.
- Wydad AC

== See also ==
- Red (disambiguation)
- RED-S, Relative Energy Deficiency in Sport
- Red scare
