= Peter Reed =

Peter Reed may refer to:

- Pete Reed (born 1981), British Olympic gold medallist rower
- Pete Reed (aid worker) (1989-2023), American aid worker
- Peter Reed (athlete) (born 1943), British Olympic athlete
- Peter Reed (criminal), Australian criminal acquitted of the Russell Street Bombing
- Peter Reed (politician), Vermont state legislator

== See also ==
- Peter Read (disambiguation)
- Peter Rede, English Member of Parliament for Dover, 1410–?
- Peter Reid (disambiguation)
