= Redd =

Redd may refer to:

- Redd (band), a Turkish rock band established in 1996 by singer Doğan Duru and guitarist Berke Hatipoğlu
- Redd (biology), the spawning ground of a salmon
- Redd (EP)
- Redd (given name), a masculine given name
- Redd (surname), an American surname

REDD, as an acronym, may refer to:

- REDD and REDD+ - a United Nations climate change mitigation policy
- Reenlistment eligibility data display - a US military personnel management format that includes vocational aptitude scores
- "Report every drunk driver" - an initiative in the 1980s to encourage citizens who witnessed motorists driving under the influence to report it by telephone immediately

== See also ==
- Red (disambiguation)
- Read (disambiguation)
