= Reade (name) =

Reade is a given name and surname of English origin. Notable people with the name include:

== Given name ==
- Reade Baker (born 1947), Canadian racehorse trainer
- Reade Brower (born 1950s), American newspaper magnate
- Reade Seligmann, a defendant falsely accused of rape in the 2006 Duke lacrosse case
- Reade Stafford (1542–1605), English twice Member of Parliament

== Surname ==
- Arthur Reade (1902–1971), British SOE agent and barrister
- Bob Reade (1932–2020), American former football player and coach
- Brian Reade (born 1957), British journalist
- Charles Reade (1814–1884), English novelist
- Charles Reade (town planner) (1880–1933), town planner
- Dolores Reade (1909–2011), American singer, entertainer, and philanthropist, wife of entertainer Bob Hope
- Edward Anderton Reade (1807–1886), British civil servant in India
- Edwin Godwin Reade (1812–1894), American politician
- Essex Reade (died 1908) British merchant banker in Argentina
- George Reade (MP) (1687–1756), British Army officer and Member of Parliament
- Henry Reade (1840–1884), English first-class cricketer, clergyman, educator and headmaster
- Herbert Taylor Reade (1828–1897), Canadian military surgeon awarded the Victoria Cross
- John Edmund Reade (1800–1870), English poet and novelist
- John Reade (1837–1919), Irish-born Canadian journalist, essayist, and poet
- Julian Reade (born 1936), British archaeologist and professor
- Joseph Reade (politician) (1694–1771), American vestryman and politician
- Joseph Bancroft Reade (1801–1870), English photographic pioneer
- Lawrence Reade (cricketer, born 1846) (1846–1910), New Zealand cricketer
- Lawrence Reade (cricketer, born 1930), New Zealand cricketer
- Linda R. Reade (born 1948), United States district judge
- Nicholas Reade (born 1946), former Anglican Bishop of Blackburn
- Orlando Reade British author and journalist
- Patrick Reade (Born 1952) British Illustrator and general practitioner
- Paul Reade (1943–1997), English composer
- Pauline Reade, murder victim
- Peter Reade (born 1939), British former sailor
- Richard Reade (1511–1575), English-born judge
- Robert Reade (died 1415), English Catholic bishop
- Shanaze Reade (born 1988), British BMX rider
- Sophie Reade, game show contestant
- Tara Reade, former U.S. Senate aide
- Teddy Reade, American professional wrestler
- Sir Thomas Reade, 4th Baronet (c. 1684–1752), British courtier and longtime Member of Parliament
- Thomas Reade (British Army officer) (1782–1849), British Army officer and collector
- Thomas Mellard Reade (1832–1909), English geologist, architect, and civil engineer
- Walter Reade (1884–1952), American theater and drive-in chain founder
- William Reade (bishop) (c. 1315–1385), medieval Bishop of Chichester
- William Morris Reade (1787–1847), Irish Conservative politician and Member of Parliament
- William Winwood Reade (1838–1875), English historian, explorer, novelist, and philosopher

== See also ==
- Read (surname), alternate spelling of the surname
- Rhead (surname)
- Reed (name)
- Reid (disambiguation)
