= Joseph Reid =

Joseph or Joe Reid may refer to:

- Joseph Reid (politician) (1917–2015), Canadian politician
- Joseph Reid (wrestler) (1905–1968), British wrestler
- Joseph D. Reid (fl. 1965– ), American professor of economics
- Joseph L. Reid (1923–2015), American oceanographer
- Joe Reid (died 1996), American flight instructor of Jessica Dubroff
- Joe Reid (American football) (born 1929), American football linebacker
- Neel Reid (1885–1926), American architect
- Joseph Reid (runner) (born 1996), British champion runner at the 2019 British Indoor Athletics Championships
- Joe Reid (footballer) (1896–1936), English footballer

== See also ==
- Joe Reed (disambiguation)
- Joseph Reed (disambiguation)
- Joseph Read (disambiguation)
- Joe Read, American politician
