= Big Blue Diamonds =

Single by Red Perkins
- B-side: "Rag Man Boogie"
- Written: 1950
- Released: 1950
- Label: King (903)
- Songwriter: Earl J.('Kit') Carson

"Big Blue Diamonds" is a song written by Earl J. (Kit) Carson in 1950 and published by Lois Music, BMI. It was first recorded by the country singer, Red Perkins, and originally issued as a 78 rpm single on King Records #903 b/w "Rag Man Boogie" in 1950. Many artists have recorded the song throughout the years, sometimes with a variation of the title including: "Blue Diamond", "Big Blue Diamond", and "Big Blue Diamonds".

One of the best-selling versions of the song was recorded in 1962 by Little Willie John on King Records which made the Billboard charts. Gene Summers with the Tom Toms had his biggest-selling single with the song in 1964 on Jamie Records and it became his signature song throughout the 1960s and 1970s. Country singer Jacky Ward covered the Summers version in 1972, where it reached #39 on the US County chart.

Although "Big Blue Diamonds" was originally written as a country song it has been able to switch genres from country to rhythm and blues, rock and roll and jazz.

== Other versions ==
- Tex Ritter (1950)
- Jimmy Dean and his Texas Wildcats (1955)
- Jack Lionel (1961)
- Sam The Sham and The Pharaohs (1965)
- Tommy Tate (1966)
- Little Johnny Taylor (1967)
- Gene Summers (1971) (new version)
- Arthur Prysock (1971)
- Mel Street (1972)
- Ernest Tubb (1972)
- Jerry Lee Lewis (1974)
- Willy DeVille (1990)
- Don Walser (1996)
- Percy Sledge (August 31, 2004)
- Van Morrison (March 7, 2006)

== Other sources ==
- Texas Music by Rick Koster, published by St. Martin's Press, USA, 1996, page 84, ref: 'Gene Summers / Big Blue Diamonds'
- Osborne Record Guide - Fifteenth Edition by Jerry Osborne, published by Crown Publishing, USA, 2001
- Rockabilly: A Forty-Year Journey by Billy Poore, published by Hal Leonard Corporation, USA, 1998, ISBN 978-0793591428
- The Billboard Book of Top 40 Country Hits by Joel Whitburn, ASIN: B008SLHOMA
- A Dream Deferred by Matt Weitz, Dallas Observer, July 31 - August 6, 1997, Volume 752, pages 73–79
