= Neptune (1810 ship) =

History

United Kingdom
- Name: Neptune
- Owner: Roberts & Co., or Roberstson
- Builder: Whitby
- Launched: 1810
- Fate: Broken up December 1821 as unseaworthy

General characteristics
- Tons burthen: 473, or 477, or 483 (bm)
- Propulsion: Sail
- Armament: 10 guns

Neptune was a merchant ship built at Whitby, England in 1810. She made two voyages transporting convicts from England to Australia before she was broken up in 1821.

== Career ==
Neptune's first master was John Smith, and her trade was Greenock-Nova Scotia.

On her first convict voyage, under the command of Robert Carns and surgeon Thomas Reid, Neptune departed The Downs on 20 December 1817 and arrived in Sydney on 5 May 1818. She embarked 173 male convicts and disembarked 170, though there were no convict deaths en route. She returned to England via Batavia.

On her second convict voyage, under the command of William McKissock (or M’Kessock, or M’Kessop) and surgeon J. Mitchell, she departed The Downs on 23 March 1820 and arrived in Sydney on 16 July 1820. She embarked with 156 male convicts and had no convict deaths en route. She left in August to return to England via Batavia.

== Fate ==
Neptune, M'Kessock, master, arrived at Cape Town on 7 September 1821 in a very leaky condition. She was returning to London from Mauritius. Resource, Fenn, master, was in November to carry the sound part of the cargo to England.

Neptune was surveyed at Simon's Bay on 15 October and was condemned as unseaworthy. She was sold for 5010 rupees for breaking up, and on 11 December she arrived at Table Bay for demolition.
