= Reads =

Reads may refer to:

- Reads, discount stores selling stationery, books and greetings cards, owned by Eason & Son
- Reads, the third book in the Mothers and Daughters graphic novel by Dave Sim, and the tenth Cerebus the Aardvark volume
- The Reads, an English alternative rock band

== See also ==
- Read (disambiguation)
