= Thomas Reed =

Thomas or Tom Reed may refer to:

== Politicians and military ==
- Thomas Buck Reed (1787–1829), senator from Mississippi
- Thomas Reed (British Army officer) (1796–1883), British general
- Thomas M. Reed (1825–1905), Washington state pioneer, merchant, surveyor, and public official
- Thomas Brackett Reed (1839–1902), Speaker of the House of Representatives from Maine
- Thomas C. Reed (1934–2024), American Secretary of the Air Force and nuclear weapons designer
- Thomas Reed (Alabama politician) (1927–1997), Alabama civil rights leader and state politician
- Tom Reed (politician) (born 1971), representative for the state of New York

== Others ==
- Thomas German Reed (1817–1888), English actor, composer, and theatrical manager
- Thomas Reed (architect) (1817–1878), Danish architect
- T. S. Reed (Thomas Sadler Reed, 1818–1914), public servant in South Australia
- Tom Reed (screenwriter) (1901–1961), American screenwriter
- Tom Reed (bishop) (1902–1995), Anglican Archbishop of Adelaide
- Tom Reed (American football) (1945–2022), American football coach
- Tom Reed (judoka) (born 1986), British judoka

== See also ==
- Thomas Read (disambiguation)
- Thomas Reade (disambiguation)
- Thomas Reid (disambiguation)
- Reed (name)
