= J. R. Reed =

J. R. Reed may refer to:

- J. R. Reed (American football, born 1982), American football safety
- J. R. Reed (gridiron football, born 1996), American and Canadian football safety
- JR Reed (actor) (born 1967), American actor and singer
- J. R. Reid (born 1968), American basketball player
