= Joe Reed =

Joe Reed may refer to:

== People ==
- Joe L. Reed (born 1938), American politician
- Joe Reed (quarterback) (born 1948), American football quarterback
- Joe Reed (wide receiver) (born 1998), American football wide receiver

== Horses ==
- Joe Reed (horse) (1921–1947), a Quarter Horse racehorse
- Joe Reed II (1936–1964), son of the above

== See also ==
- Joseph Reed (disambiguation)
- Joseph Reid (disambiguation)
- Joel M. Reed, film producer
