= Jeff Reed =

Jeff Reed may refer to:

- Jeff Reed (baseball) (born 1962), American baseball catcher
- Jeff Reed (American football) (born 1979), American football place kicker
- Jeff Reed, candidate in the 2010 United States House of Representatives elections in Missouri

== See also ==
- Geoffrey Reed (1892–1970), Australian judge
- Jeff Reid (born 1974), Canada international rugby union player
