= Reed Airport =

Reed Airport may refer to:

- Reed Airport (Oregon), a private use airport in Olex, Oregon, United States (FAA: 1OR5)
- Reed Ranch Airport, a public use airport in Yellow Pine, Idaho, United States (FAA: I92)
- Driggs-Reed Memorial Airport, a public use airport in Driggs, Idaho, United States, USA (FAA: DIJ)

Airports in places named Reed:

- Nartron Field a public use airport in Reed City, Michigan, United States (FAA/IATA: RCT)

== See also ==
- Harry Reid International Airport, Las Vegas, Nevada
