= Reed High School =

Reed High School may refer to:

- Edward C. Reed High School, a school in Sparks, Nevada
- Sarah T. Reed High School, a school in New Orleans, Louisiana

== See also ==
- Reed-Custer High School, in Braidwood, Illinois
