= Read (automobile) =

Defunct American motor vehicle manufacturer

The Read car was manufactured by the Read Motor Company in Detroit, Michigan from 1913 to 1914.

== History ==
Ray J. Read, Joseph Beatty and Roy Herald established the Read Motor Company for the manufacture of a four-cylinder 20-hp touring car on a 115-inch wheelbase. Designated the Model X, the Read had a gray body with white striping and was priced at $850, equivalent to $27,689 in 2025.

Company offices and showrooms were at 541 Woodward Avenue, with the factory at 68 Champlain Street. In December of 1913 the company was petitioned into bankruptcy and production ceased in 1914.
