= Vivian Reed =

Vivian Reed may refer to:

- Vivian Reed (actress, born 1945) (born 1945), African-American actress, singer, and dancer
- Vivian Reed (silent film actress) (1894–1989), American silent film actress
