= Read (given name) =

Read is a given name of the following notable people:

- Read Montague (born 1960) American neuroscientist and popular science author
- Read Samadov, Azerbaijani chess player
- Read Viemeister (1922–1993), American industrial designer
