= Tracy Reed =

Tracy Reed is the name of:

- Tracy Reed (English actress) (1942–2012), actress from London
- Tracy Reed (American actress) (born 1949), actress from Fort Benning, Georgia
- Tracy Reed (writer), internet writer

== See also ==
- Tracy Reid, American basketball player
- Tracy Read, American racing campaigner
