= Thomas Reade (royalist) =

English royalist army officer and civil lawyer

- Born: 1606; Linkenholt, Hampshire
- Died: March 1669 (aged 62–63)
- Occupations: Royalist army officer and civil lawyer

Thomas Reade, or Thomas Read, (1606 – March 1669) was an English royalist army officer and civil lawyer.

== Biography ==
Reade was born at Linkenholt, Hampshire, in 1606. He was the second son of Robert Reade of Linkenholt, by his second wife, Mildred, sister of Sir Francis Windebank. He entered Winchester College as a scholar in 1617 (Kirby, Winchester Scholars, p. 168). Through the influence of his uncle Windebank, afterwards secretary of state, he was appointed, on 29 January 1620, Latin secretary to the crown for life (Cal. State Papers, Dom. 1619–23, p. 8), and in 1624, at the king's request, a scholarship at New College was bestowed on him. He was elected a fellow in 1626. He made no serious effort to study, and caused both his uncle and the warden of the college some disquietude by his frivolities (ib. 1627–8 p. 473, 1631–3 p. 549). Upon the death of his mother, however (her will is dated 15 August 1630), and the receipt of his inheritance, Read applied himself to law, and graduated B.C.L. on 11 October 1631. Windebank sent his son John from Winchester to New College in the October term of 1636, to be under Read's tuition ‘in logic and other learning.’ Dr. Robert Pinck, the warden, promised to have a watchful eye over them, ‘tutor and all, for he’ (the tutor) ‘is very able and to spare’ (ib. 1634–5, p. 230). Read corresponded, chiefly in Latin, with his uncle about John's progress and welfare until 1638 (State Papers, Dom. passim). In that year he became D.C.L.

When the civil war broke out, Read enlisted at Oxford as a royalist under Captain William Holland, son of Thomas Holland, the regius professor of divinity at Oxford. With one or two other doctors and many undergraduates he was drilled in the ‘parke’ of New College and at Christ Church (Wood, Annals, ed. Gutch, vol. ii. pt. i. p. 443, &c.) Read was one of the delegates—the scholars called them ‘a council of war’—appointed to provide for the maintenance of the king's troopers in Oxford, and was ordered to disburse the sum of 5l. in the provision of bows and arrows (ib. p. 448). With about a hundred other university men, he left Oxford on 10 Sept. to serve as volunteers with Sir John Byron's troops. At Chipping Norton they were waylaid by a troop of horse under John Fiennes, son of Lord Saye and Sele, but Read escaped to Worcester.

Read returned to Oxford before 1643, and was admitted, by the king's mandate of 16 October 1643, principal of Magdalen Hall, in the place of Thomas Wilkinson, who had joined the parliamentary party and left the university. When Oxford surrendered to the parliament in 1646, Wilkinson was restored. Read was apprehended by a warrant of the committee of both houses of parliament on 7 July 1648, and ordered to bring his papers and writings before them (Cal. State Papers, Dom. 1648–9, p. 170).

Soon after he went abroad, and was ordained a catholic priest at Douay on 6 March 1649. Wood says it was reported he was a Carthusian. He wrote in defence of Romanism a reply to Edward Boughen's ‘Account of the Church Catholic,’ London, 1653, 4to. His work was printed at Paris in 1659, but no copy seems extant.

At the Restoration Read returned to London, was admitted into the College of Advocates on 8 May 1661, was allowed to live in Doctors' Commons, and was appointed surrogate to Sir William Meyrick, judge of the prerogative court of Canterbury. He died in poverty at Exeter House, Strand, to which, after the great fire, Doctors' Commons had been removed, early in March 1669. His brother Robert was for a time secretary to Sir Francis Windebanke (ib. 1651–3, pp. 155, 524, 567, &c.)
