= Jocelyn Read =

Canadian physicist

- Born: Calgary, Alberta
- Awards: Fellow of the American Physical Society

Academic background
- Education: University of British Columbia (BSc); University of Wisconsin–Milwaukee (PhD)
- Thesis: Neutron stars in compact binary systems: From the equation of state to gravitational radiation (2008)
- Academic advisors: John L. Friedman, Jolien Creighton

Academic work
- Discipline: Physics, Astronomy
- Institutions: California State University, Fullerton

Jocelyn Samantha Read is a Canadian physicist and professor of physics at California State University, Fullerton, known for her research on gravitational waves and neutron stars. She is a member of the LIGO Scientific Collaboration, and is an author of research characterizing the gravitational waves caused by neutron star and black hole collisions, and using the measurements of those waves to provide observational verification of the equations of state of neutron stars.

== Education and career ==
Read grew up in Calgary, Alberta, and was motivated to study science out of a childhood love of science fiction. She did her undergraduate studies at the University of British Columbia, with honours in a double major in mathematics and physics; she writes that she chose this combination of topics both for its difficulty and its flexibility in future directions. She then went to the Center for Gravitation and Cosmology at the University of Wisconsin–Milwaukee, where her 2008 doctoral dissertation, Neutron stars in compact binary systems: from the equation of state to gravitational radiation, was jointly supervised by John L. Friedman and Jolien Creighton.

Before joining the California State University, Fullerton faculty in 2012, she was a postdoctoral researcher at the Max Planck Institute for Gravitational Physics (Albert Einstein Institute) and at the University of Mississippi.

== Recognition ==
In 2019, Read was named a Fellow of the American Physical Society (APS), after a nomination from the APS Division of Gravitational Physics, "for contributions to the understanding of extreme matter within neutron stars, including its effects on gravitational-wave observations, and for the inclusive recruiting and mentoring of next generation gravitational-wave scientists".
