= Reeds Branch =

Stream in Vernon County, Missouri, U.S.

Coordinates: 37°58′59″N 94°24′30″W

Reeds Branch is a stream in Vernon County, Missouri, in the United States. It is a tributary of the Little Osage River.

Reeds Branch was named for the family of Solomon Samuel Reed, pioneers who settled there in the 1840s.

== See also ==
- List of rivers of Missouri
