= Reed bird =

Reed bird may refer to:

- Reed bunting
- Pallas's reed bunting
- Eurasian reed warbler
- Australian reed warbler
