= Thomas Reid (naval surgeon) =

Irish-born naval surgeon

- Born: 1791; Ireland
- Died: 21 August 1825 (aged 33–34); Pentonville, London
- Occupation: Royal Navy surgeon

Thomas Reid (1791–1825), was an Irish-born naval surgeon in the Royal Navy. Educated near Dungannon, County Tyrone, he joined the Navy in around 1811 and passed the examinations of the Royal College of Surgeons in London in 1813.

On 10 January 1814 he was appointed as a naval surgeon. In the role as a surgeon superintendent he made two trips on prison ships, one in the convict ship Neptune carrying male prisoners departed 16 December 1817 and arrived om 5 May 1818 at Sydney and on Morley, which departed London carrying female prisoners on 22 May 1820 and arrived on 29 August 1820 at Hobart with further travel to leave prisoners at Sydney.

Reid was a close associate of the prison reformer Elizabeth Fry and it was at the suggestion of Fry that Reid had taken on the role of surgeon superintendent for these journeys. It was to Fry that Reid dedicated his book, Two voyages to New South Wales and Van Diemen's Land.

On his return to London he subsequently revisited Ireland on a long tour in 1822, the record of which he documented in a book, Travels in Ireland in the year 1822, exhibiting a brief sketches of the Moral, Physical and Political state of the Country published in London in 1823.

== Bibliography ==
- Two voyages to New South Wales and Van Diemen's Land, London 1822
- Travels in Ireland in the year 1822, exhibiting a brief sketches of the Moral, Physical and Political state of the Country, London 1823
