= Red Lake Falls =

Red Lake Falls is the name of several places in the United States:

- Red Lake Falls, Minnesota
- Red Lake Falls Township, Red Lake County, Minnesota
