= Shirley Town F.C. =

Former association football club in England

Shirley Town
- Full name: Shirley Town F.C.
- Founded: 1933
- Dissolved: 1944
- Ground: Church Road
- President: George Featherstone
- Manager: E. J. Jennings
Home colours

Shirley Town F.C. was a non-league association football club from Solihull, England, active in the last decade before the Second World War.

== History ==
The club was founded by George Featherstone, a local contractor, in 1933. The club joined the Birmingham Combination in time for the 1935–36 season, although its ambitions originally spread wider, with secretary/manager E. J. Jennings proposing a revamped league allowing 2 full-time professionals per side in 1937.

The club was generally a mid-table Combination outfit, and entered the FA Cup from 1935–36 to 1938–39, although it was forced to start in the extra preliminary rounds, and never made it beyond the first qualifying round; its best showing, in 1937–38, ended in a defeat at Shrewsbury Town.

=== Solihull Town ===
Before the 1938–39 season, the club changed its name to Solihull Town.

The club benefitted from Aston Villa in WW2, when the Police Chief Constable of Birmingham, C.C.H Moriarty, intimated that he would not sanction football matches within the city of Birmingham. Solihull Town "B" fielded Aston Villa first-choice goalkeeper, Joe Rutherford as well as Villa-reserves, Les Latham and C.S. Batty against Tamworth in the Birmingham Combination in December 1939. The club gained its greatest honours, by winning the 1939–40 Combination and the Birmingham Senior Cup, albeit that year the competitions lacked full participation owing to the war - indeed Solihull had two XIs in the Combination itself. The club beat Darlaston in the final of the at the Hawthorns thanks to goals from Billy Boswell and (in the last minute) Davies.

However that seems to have been the final match played by the club, as it went into abeyance for the rest of the war, and never re-emerged. Although in 1944 the club had expressed an interest in re-joining the Combination as soon as it re-started, by 1945 it had ceased activities, with Featherstone moving on to redeveloping a racecourse in the area. The Shirley Town name was revived by an amateur club after the war, and the club stepped up in the semi-professional leagues in 1974 when merging with West Shirley Athletic.

== Colours ==
The club played in blue shirts, white shorts, and blue stockings.

== Ground ==
The club played at the Shirley Stadium, on Church Road, opposite the Plume of Feathers public house. The club opened a covered stand, seating 1,000, on 30 November 1935, in a Combination match with Aston Villa's A side on 30 November 1935.

== Notable players ==
- Billy Austin, former international and FA Cup winner with Manchester City
- George Parkin, formerly of Burnley and West Ham United
- Alf Maitland, formerly of Newcastle United
- Jack Russell, formerly of Birmingham, Norwich, and Bournemouth & Boscombe Athletic
- Emlyn Jones, formerly of Southend United
- Tommy Read, goalkeeper, formerly of Grimsby Town
- Jack Snape, right-back, the club's first professional, who signed for Coventry City in 1936
