= Red Perkins (country singer) =

American singer-songwriter

- Born: August 3, 1920
- Died: August 15, 1990 (aged 70)
- Labels: King Records; De Luxe Records; Cattle Records (Germany)

Red Perkins (August 3, 1920 – August 15, 1990) was an American country music singer from Ohio, United States.

== Early life ==
Perkins was born in Kentucky.

== Career ==
Perkins worked from a home base of Dayton, Ohio.

== Selected discography ==
As Red Perkins, Red Perkins and the Kentucky Redheads who recorded with De Luxe Records and King Records

- 1948: "One Has My Name (The Other Has My Heart)/I Live The Life I Love", 78rpm single (De Luxe Records/King Records 5047)
- 1948: "Someday You'll Call My Name/You're Gonna Regret It All Someday", 78rpm single (De Luxe Records/King Records 5052)
- 1949: "Aggravating Lou From Louisville/Hoedown Boogie", 78rpm single (King Records 792)
- 1949: "I Know Better Now/Too Long", 78rpm single (King Records 823)
- 1950: "Crocodile Tears/I Hate You", 78rpm single (King Records 836)
- 1950: "One At A Time/I'm So Happy I Could Cry", 78rpm single (King Records 850)
- 1950: "Big Blue Diamonds/Rag Man Boogie", 78rpm single (King Records 903)
- 1951: "I'm Gonna Rush Right Down To Macon/A Long Necked Bottle", 78rpm single (King Records 920)

== Former members (partial list) ==
- Jim Alexander
- Jesse Ashlock
- Cecil Brower (alumni of the Milton Brown Band)
- Fred Calhoun
- Harry Fooks
- Clarence Gray
- Jay Green
- Wilbert H. (Bill) Osborne
- Jabbo Smith, trumpet
- Anna Mae Winburn, singer
