= Joseph Reed =

Joseph Reed may refer to:

- Joseph Reed (playwright) (1723–1787), English playwright and poet
- Joseph Reed (politician) (1741–1785), Continental Congressmen, aide-de-camp to George Washington, President of Pennsylvania
- Joseph Reed (lawyer) (1772–1846), Pennsylvania Attorney General
- Joseph Reed (architect) (c. 1823–1890), Australian architect
- Joseph Haythorne Reed (1828–1858), British Member of Parliament
- Joseph Rea Reed (1835–1925), U.S. Representative from Iowa
- Joseph Verner Reed Jr. (1937–2016), American banker and diplomat

== See also ==
- Joe Reed (disambiguation)
- Joseph Reid (disambiguation)
- Joseph Read (disambiguation)
