= Read family of Delaware =

American political dynasty

The Read family of Delaware were a prominent political family in the 18th and 19th centuries in Delaware, New Jersey and Pennsylvania. The family was founded by John Read, a wealthy Englishman who was one of the founders of Chestertown, Maryland.

== Family members ==
- John Read (1688 – June 17, 1756), m. Mary Howell, resided New Castle County, Delaware
  - George Read (September 18, 1733 – September 21, 1798), m. Gertrude Ross Till, resided New Castle, Delaware. Signer of the Declaration of Independence, U.S. Senator, and Acting President of Delaware.
    - John, died in infancy
    - George Jr., resided New Castle, Delaware
    - John (July 7, 1769 – July 13, 1854), banker, resided Philadelphia, Pennsylvania
      - John Merideth Read (July 21, 1797 – November 29, 1874), Chief Justice of Pennsylvania, resided Philadelphia, Pennsylvania
        - John Merideth Read (February 21, 1837 – ) diplomatist
  - Thomas Read (1740 – October 26, 1788), Commodore, U.S. Navy, resided Bordentown, New Jersey
  - James Read (1743 – December 31, 1822), Colonel, Continental Army, resided Philadelphia, Pennsylvania
  - Mary, m. 1769 Gunning Bedford Sr.
