= Reed–Muller =

Reed–Muller may refer to:

- Reed–Muller code
- Reed–Muller expansion
