= Reed-Wood Place =

Historic house in Massachusetts, United States

- U.S. National Register of Historic Places
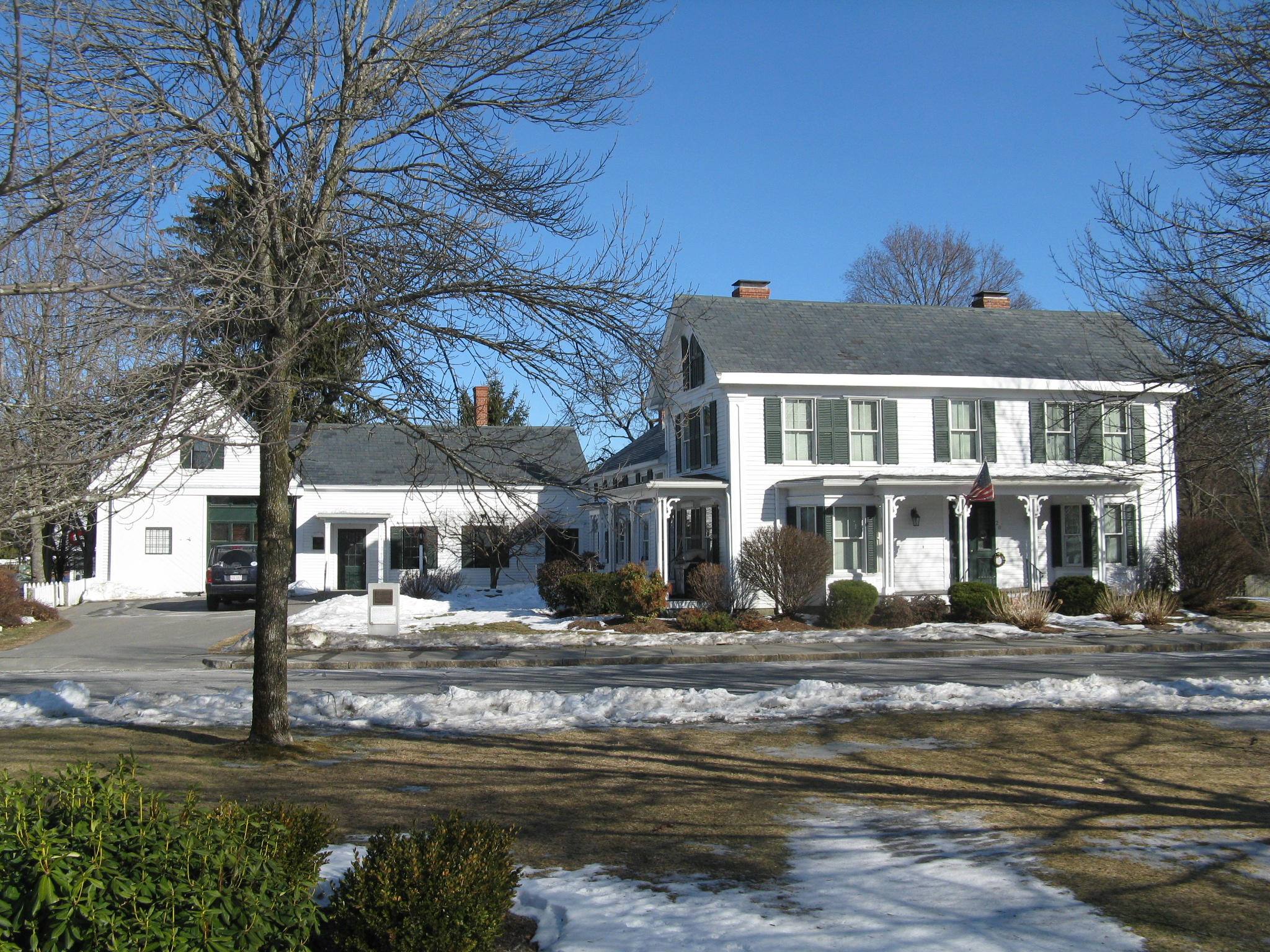
- Reed-Wood Place

- Location within Massachusetts Location within the United States
- Location: Littleton, Massachusetts
- Coordinates: 42°32′47″N 71°28′20″W
- Architectural style: Federal, Greek Revival
- NRHP reference No.: 00001071
- Added to NRHP: September 14, 2000

The Reed—Wood Place is a historic farmstead at 20 Meetinghouse Road in Littleton, Massachusetts.

== Description and history ==
It is a complex of attached buildings typical of 19th century New England farms. At one end is the main house, a 2 1/2 five bay wood-frame structure, was probably built sometime before 1812 for Isaac and Mary Gardner Reed. The house exhibits a variety of architectural styles, having elements of Federal, Greek Revival, Italianate, and Gothic Revival elements that were applied by successive generations in the 19th century. A 1 1/2 ell extends north from the main block, joining the house to a shed and early 19th-century barn, which have been adaptively rehabilitated into office space.

The house was listed on the National Register of Historic Places in 2000.

== See also ==
- National Register of Historic Places listings in Middlesex County, Massachusetts
