= Rhead =

Rhead is a surname, and may refer to:

- Charlotte Rhead (1885–1947), English ceramics designer
- Frederick Alfred Rhead (1856–1933), English potter
- Frederick Hurten Rhead (1880–1942), ceramicist and figure in the Arts and Crafts movement
- Louis Rhead (1857–1926), English-born American artist, illustrator, author, and angler
- Matt Rhead (born 1984), English footballer

== See also ==
- Reade (name), given name and surname
- Read (surname)
- Reed (name)
- Reid (disambiguation)
