= USS Beverly W. Reid =

1944 Crosley-class high speed transport

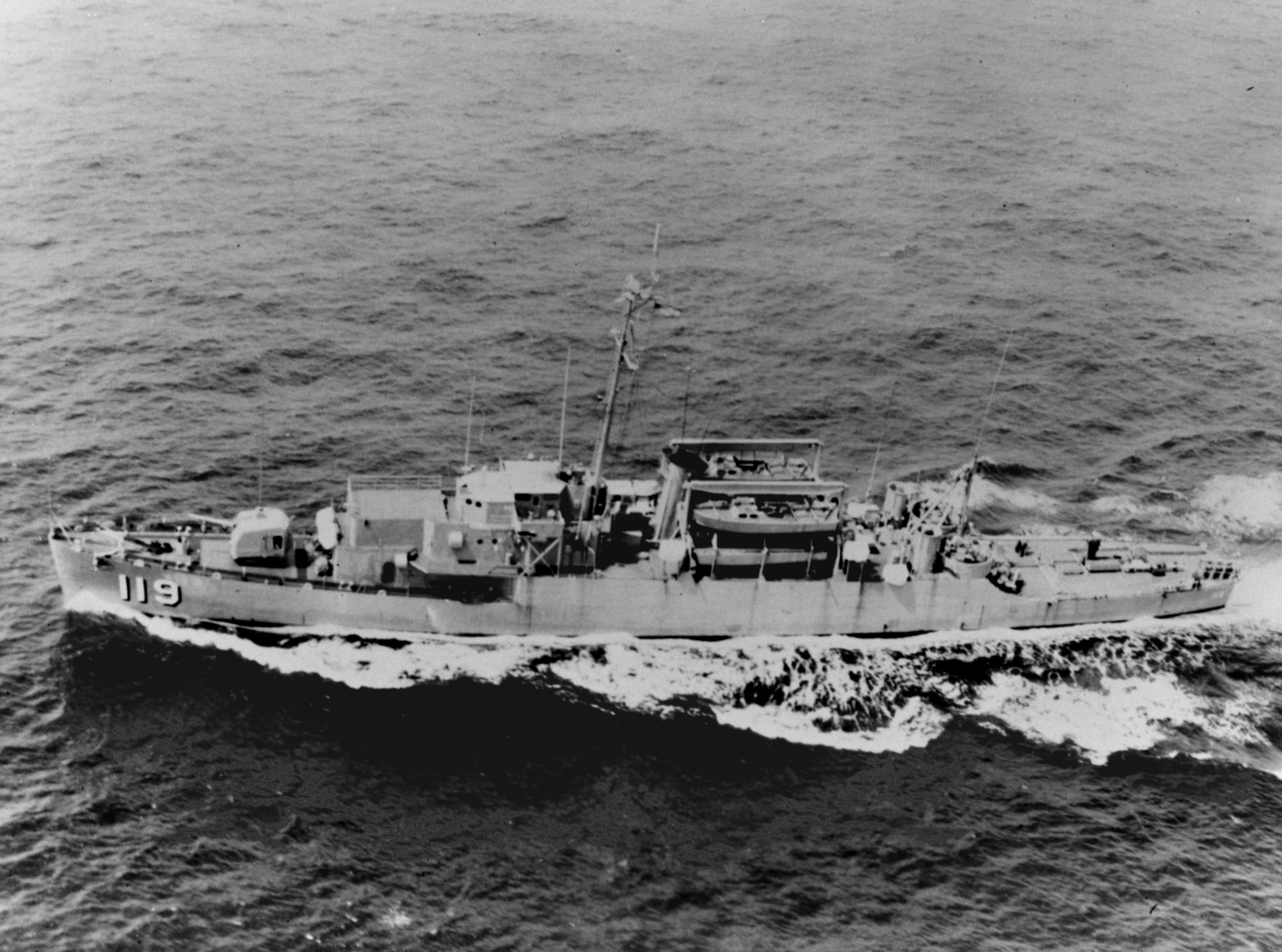
- USS Beverly W. Reid

History

United States
- Name: USS Beverly W. Reid
- Namesake: Ensign Beverly W. Reid (1917-1942), a U.S. Navy officer and Navy Cross recipient
- Builder: Dravo Corporation, Neville Island, Pennsylvania; Consolidated Steel Corporation, Orange, Texas
- Laid down: 5 January 1944
- Launched: 4 March 1944
- Sponsored by: Mrs. Eloise Ziegler
- Commissioned: 25 June 1945
- Decommissioned: 5 May 1947
- Recommissioned: 18 March 1967
- Decommissioned: 14 November 1969
- Reclassified: From destroyer escort (DE-722) to high-speed transport (APD-119) 17 July 1944; As amphibious transport, small (LPR-119) 1 July 1969
- Stricken: 15 September 1974
- Fate: Sold for scrapping 18 August 1975
- Notes: Laid down as Rudderow-class destroyer escort USS Beverly W. Reid (DE-722)

General characteristics
- Class & type: Crosley-class high speed transport
- Displacement: 2,130 long tons (2,164 t) full
- Length: 306 ft (93 m)
- Beam: 37 ft (11 m)
- Draft: 12 ft 7 in (3.84 m)
- Speed: 23 knots (43 km/h; 26 mph)
- Troops: 162
- Complement: 204
- Armament: 1 × 5 in (130 mm) gun; 6 × 40 mm guns; 6 × 20 mm guns; 2 × depth charge tracks

USS Beverly W. Reid (APD-119/LPR-119), was a United States Navy high-speed transport in commission from 1945 to 1947 and from 1967 to 1969.

== Namesake ==
Beverly William Reid was born on 22 April 1917 in New Orleans, Louisiana. He attended Redemptorist College in New Orleans, before he enlisted in the U.S. Navy on 17 June 1935. After completing boot camp, Reid reported on board the aircraft carrier USS Lexington on 28 November 1935, and remained in that ship for over two years. Reporting to Naval Air Station Pensacola, Florida, on 25 March 1938 for flight training as a naval aviation pilot, he received his wings on 29 March 1939. After service with Torpedo Squadron 3, on the aircraft carrier USS Saratoga, Reid was transferred to Naval Air Station Pearl Harbor, Territory of Hawaii, on 12 August 1941. He was serving there when Japanese planes raided Oahu on 7 December 1941.

Transferred to Fighting Squadron 2 aboard Lexington on 27 December 1941, Aviation Machinist's Mate Second Class Reid was aboard that ship as it patrolled southwest of Oahu between 29 December 1941 and 16 January 1942. Having been advanced to the rate of aviation machinist's mate first class by that point, he was transferred to aircraft carrier USS Enterprise on 28 March 1942, along with nine other naval aviation pilots, for temporary duty with Fighting Squadron 6, in time for Enterprise's departure with Task Force 16 in support of the Doolittle Raid. On 18 April 1942, the day of the Doolittle Raid, Reid flew with Enterprise's third combat air patrol of the day when lookouts spotted two Japanese guard boats. He and the other seven pilots of the combat air patrol then strafed the enemy vessels, sinking one and forcing the other, Nagato Maru, to surrender.

Reid was designated a naval aviator on 5 May 1942. During the Battle of Midway, he flew three combat air patrol missions on 4 June 1942, including one during which his section was vectored over to defend the crippled aircraft carrier USS Yorktown. He carried out aggressive attacks on two Japanese torpedo planes and was credited with two confirmed "kills". He also took part in strafing the Japanese destroyers Asashio and Arashio as they assisted the crippled heavy cruisers Mogami and Mikuma on 6 June 1942. For his attack Japanese torpedo bombers on 4 June 1942 at Midway, Reid received the Navy Cross.

Commissioned an ensign on 23 July 1942, took part in the Battle of the Eastern Solomons on 24 August 1942. He flew one of the 27 Fighting Squadron 6 fighters scrambled for the combat air patrol over Task Force 17, and, as one of two pilots listed as missing in action, was probably shot down by a Mitsubishi A6M "Zero" fighter in the ensuing action. Never seen again, Reid was presumed killed in action.

== Construction and commissioning ==
Beverly W. Reid was laid down as the Rudderow-class destroyer escort USS Beverly W. Reid (DE-722) on 5 January 1944 by the Dravo Corporation at Neville Island, Pennsylvania. She was launched on 4 March 1944, sponsored by Mrs. Eloise Ziegler, the mother of the ship's namesake.

Beverly W. Reid was reclassified as a Crosley-class high-speed transport and redesignated APD-119 on 17 July 1944, and was taken down the Ohio River and Mississippi River to Orange, Texas, where the Consolidated Steel Corporation completed her as such. She was commissioned on 25 June 1945.

== First period in commission, 1945-1947 ==
After fitting out, Beverly W. Reid departed Galveston, Texas, on 10 July 1945 and arrived at Guantanamo Bay, Cuba, on 13 July 1945. Following shakedown, she departed for Norfolk, Virginia, on 7 August 1945, arriving on 10 August. While she was at Norfolk, World War II ended with the surrender of Japan on 15 August 1945.

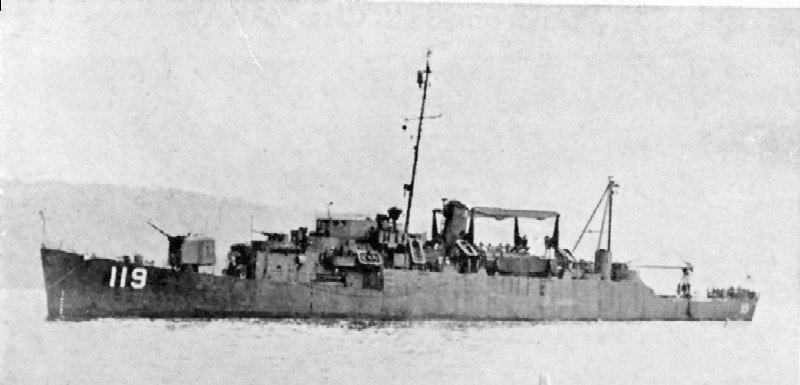
Beverly W. Reid, circa in 1945.

At Norfolk, she underwent a post-shakedown shipyard availability that lasted well into October 1945. Proceeding thence to New York City, Beverly W. Reid took part in President Harry S Truman's Presidential Review on Navy Day, 27 October 1945. She departed New York City on 30 October 1945 and, after anchoring overnight at the Harbor of Refuge, reached Philadelphia, Pennsylvania the next day.

Scheduled for inactivation, Beverly W. Reid departed Philadelphia on 17 November 1945 and set course via the Chesapeake and Delaware Canal for Norfolk, which she reached on 18 November. Bad weather postponed her departure for Florida until 23 November 1945. Pausing at Jacksonville, Florida, en route, she arrived at Green Cove Springs, Florida, on 27 November.

Inactivated at Green Cove Springs and placed in reserve on 1 September 1946, Beverly W. Reid was decommissioned on 5 May 1947 and placed in the Florida Group of the Atlantic Reserve Fleet at Green Cove Springs. Reid was moved from Green Cove Springs to the Naval Reserve Fleet in Orange, Texas and remained there until movement to Little Creek Amphibious Base by the crew of the USS Liddle.

== Second period in commission, 1967-1969 ==
After nearly 20 years of inactivity, Beverly W. Reid was inspected and prepared for towing to Little Creek, Virginia by a Naval tug by high-speed transport USS Liddle crew. The Liddle crew worked with civilian contractors to modernize the Reid, on 18 March 1967 she was recommissioned at the Norfolk Shipbuilding and Drydock Company at Norfolk and manned by the crew of Liddle, which decommissioned that day.

Assigned to Amphibious Squadron 8, Beverly W. Reid was home-ported at Naval Amphibious Base Little Creek in Virginia Beach, Virginia, to which she shifted on 19 April 1967.

=== 1967 ===
After fitting out and local operations, Beverly W. Reid departed for Guantanamo Bay, Cuba, on 5 May 1967. There she carried out shakedown training into mid-June 1967.

Beverly W. Reid departed Guantanamo Bay for Little Creek on 16 June 1967, and arrived there on 19 June. Following post-shakedown upkeep at Little Creek, she conducted training in amphibious landings and underwater demolition team exercises. In late July and early August 1967, she visited Montreal, Quebec, in Canada, for the international exposition Expo 67.

Back at Little Creek on 11 August 1967, Beverly W. Reid resumed amphibious exercises on 16 August 1967 and remained so occupied through the end of August 1967. She spent most of September 1967 pierside in upkeep at Little Creek, making only a single five-day excursion to Onslow Bay in North Carolina late in the month. She operated off the Virginia Capes from 9 to 15 October 1967, then carried out more amphibious drills at Onslow Beach in North Carolina. In port at Little Creek from 19 October until 31 October 1967, she met amphibious transport dock USS Raleigh at sea for more exercises off the Virginia Capes on 1 November 1967. Back at Little Creek on 2 November, Beverly W. Reid moored alongside repair ship USS Vulcan on 6 November 1967 for repairs. The repairs lasted until 24 November 1967, when she returned to Little Creek for the rest of 1967.

=== 1968 ===
On 2 January 1968, Beverly W. Reid left for Puerto Rico to join the Caribbean Amphibious Ready Group, arriving at Roosevelt Roads on 6 January 1968. After amphibious training at Vieques Island until 9 January 1968, she departed with attack cargo ship USS Muliphen and landing ship dock USS Spiegel Grove for a port visit at Willemstad on Curaçao in the Netherlands Antilles from 12 January 1968 to 16 January 1968; the three ships then headed back to Vieques Island to resume amphibious training with Task Group 44.9 on the morning of 17 January 1968. After a whole repertoire of drills—ship-to-shore exercises, gunfire support and antiaircraft exercises -- Beverly W. Reid visited Charlotte Amalie in the United States Virgin Islands from 23 January 1968 to 26 January 1968. She returned to Puerto Rican waters briefly on 28 January 1968 and 29 January 1968 and then headed for the Panama Canal Zone on 29 January 1968 in company with Raleigh, Spiegel Grove, landing ship tank USS Grant County, amphibious assault ship USS Guam, and Muliphen. The amphibious ready group carried out its mission in Panamanian waters, and then Beverly W. Reid called at Grenada from 15 February 1968 to 22 February 1068. She rejoined the amphibious ready group on 23 February 1968 and headed back to Puerto Rican waters. She reached Vieques Island on 24 February 1968, and operated locally until the second week in March 1968. After a visit to Frederiksted on St. Croix in the U.S. Virgin Islands, Beverly W. Reid set course on 17 March 1068 to return to Little Creek.

Beverly W. Reid arrived at Little Creek on 23 March 1968 and remained there for almost a month, before embarking a six-day trip to Onslow Bay to do sounding surveys on 21 April 1968. She returned to Little Creek on 27 March 1968 and stayed close to home during May 1968, mixing upkeep with hydrographic surveys of the waters off Camp Pendleton in Virginia Beach and work with fleet ocean tug USS Shakori to help battleship USS New Jersey in gunnery calibration exercises off the Virginia Capes.

Underway on 1 June 1968, Beverly W. Reid sailed for Port Canaveral, Florida, arriving there on 3 June 1968. Over the next several days, she served as an observation platform for the Naval Ordnance Test Unit during test firings of Polaris submarine-launched ballistic missiles by the fleet ballistic missile submarines USS John Marshall and USS Thomas A. Edison. Tests complete, she departed for the Tidewater, Virginia, area on 18 June 1968.

Beverly W. Reid arrived at Little Creek on 20 June 1968, but after less than two weeks she embarked upon a succession of port visits, stopping at New York City, the Canadian ports of Pictu and Halifax, Nova Scotia, and Boothbay, Maine.

Back at Little Creek on 13 July 1968, Beverly W. Reid resumed training with the United States Atlantic Fleet Amphibious Force, evolutions that included gunfire support exercises off Camp Pendleton, Virginia, as well as work in antisubmarine warfare and amphibious warfare tactics. During that time, she was reclassified a "small amphibious transport" and was redesignated LPR-119 on 14 August 1968. On 23 August 1968, the locus of her operations shifted to the waters near Charleston, South Carolina, where she provided services to the fleet ballistic missile submarine John Marshall until late on 24 August 1968. She returned to Norfolk for a repairs alongside destroyer tender USS Sierra between 27 August 1968 and 20 September 1968.

After a final series of amphibious drills at Onslow Beach late in September 1968, Beverly W. Reid was placed in reduced operational status on 1 October 1968 as part of an economy measure. She remained in that status at Little Creek for the better part of a year.

== Final decommissioning and disposal ==
Finally, Beverly W. Reid departed Little Creek on 30 September 1969 bound for inactivation at Orange, Texas. She arrived at the Naval Inactive Ship Maintenance Facility at Orange on 6 October 1969 and began the process immediately.

Beverly W. Reid was decommissioned and placed in reserve at Orange on 14 November 1969, and she remained there, inactive, for almost five years. Her name stricken from the Naval Vessel Register on 15 September 1974, and was sold for $79,002 (USD) to J. R. Steel, Inc., of Houston, Texas, on 18 August 1975 for scrapping.
