= Justice Reed (disambiguation) =

Justice Reed refers to Stanley Forman Reed, associate justice of the U.S. Supreme Court.

Justice Reed may also refer to:

- William Reed (Massachusetts judge) (fl. 1770s), a judge who declined appointment to the Massachusetts Supreme Judicial Court
- Joseph Reed (politician) (1741–1785), an associate justice of the Supreme Court of Pennsylvania
- Joseph Rea Reed (1835–1925), an associate justice of the Iowa Supreme Court
- Nathaniel C. Reed (c. 1810–1853), an associate justice of the Ohio Supreme Court
- Scott Elgin Reed (1921–1994), an associate justice of the Kentucky Supreme Court

== See also ==
- Judge Reed (disambiguation)
- Justice Read (disambiguation)
- Justice Reid (disambiguation)
