= Trevor Read =

Canadian ice hockey player

- Born: December 1, 1980 (age 45) Calgary, Alberta, Canada
- Height: 6 ft 1 in (185 cm)
- Weight: 215 lb (98 kg; 15 st 5 lb)
- Position: Defence
- Shot: Left
- Played for: Basingstoke Bison (EIHL); Rapaces de Gap (Ligue Magnus); Hull Stingrays (EIHL)
- Playing career: 2002–2011

Trevor Read (born December 1, 1980, in Calgary, Alberta) is a Canadian former ice hockey defenceman who last played for the Hull Stingrays in England, in 2010–2011.

== Career ==
Read began his professional hockey career in 2002 with the ECHL's Toledo Storm. He also played in the ECHL for the Peoria Rivermen and the Long Beach Ice Dogs. Read then moved to the Central Hockey League for a brief spell with the Austin Ice Bats before spending two and a half years with the Amarillo Gorillas. He moved to the UK in 2008, signing with the Basingstoke Bison and left on September 30, 2009 United Kingdom to sign for French team Rapaces de Gap.
