= Justice Reid =

Justice Reid may refer to:

- Robert Reid (judge) (1855–1923), associate justice of the Louisiana Supreme Court
- Charles S. Reid (1897–1947), associate justice of the Supreme Court of Georgia
- Neil E. Reid (1871–1956), associate justice of the Michigan Supreme Court
- Lyle Reid (born 1930), associate justice of the Tennessee Supreme Court

== See also ==
- Justice Read (disambiguation)
- Justice Reed (disambiguation)
