= Justice Read =

Justice Read may refer to:

- George Read (American politician, born 1733) (1733–1798), chief justice of Delaware
- John M. Read (1797–1874), chief justice of the Pennsylvania Supreme Court
- Lazarus Hammond Read (c. 1815–1855), associate justice of the Utah Supreme Court
- Susan Phillips Read (born 1947), judge of the New York Court of Appeals

== See also ==
- Edwin Godwin Reade, associate justice of the North Carolina Supreme Court
- Justice Reed (disambiguation)
- Justice Reid (disambiguation)
