= Reed Middle School =

Reed Middle School can refer to several United States middle schools, including:

- Walter Reed Middle School in the Studio City area of Los Angeles, California
- Reed Middle School in Springfield, Missouri
- Reed Middle School in Hubbard, Ohio
- Reed Middle School in Duncanville, Texas
