= Reid (disambiguation) =

Reid is a Scottish surname.

Reid may also refer to:

== Places ==
- Reid, Australian Capital Territory, inner suburb of Canberra, Australia
- Reid, South Australia, suburb of Adelaide, South Australia
- Division of Reid, a Sydney electorate in the Australian House of Representatives
- Reid, Maryland, census-designated place in Washington County
- Reid, West Virginia
- Utica Avenue, in Brooklyn, New York City; the northern portion was formerly Reid Avenue
- Reid Rocks, small rocky islet in western Bass Strait, Tasmania, Australia
- Reids Peak, a mountain in Utah, US

== Ships ==
- USS Reid, the name of various United States Navy ships
- USS Beverly W. Reid (DE-722), a United States Navy destroyer escort converted during construction into the high-speed transport USS Beverly W. Reid (APD-119)
- USS Beverly W. Reid (APD-119), a United States Navy high-speed transport in commission from 1945 to 1947 and from 1967 to 1969

== Other uses ==
- Reid (given name), includes a list of people with the name
- Reid camera, manufactured by Reid and Sigrist, based on Leica designs
- Reid technique, a method of interrogation
- The Reid vapor pressure, a measure of the volatility of gasoline

== See also ==
- Reed (disambiguation)
- Read (disambiguation)
- Reid's, a hotel in Funchal, Madeira
- Reade (disambiguation)
- Rhead
- Ried (disambiguation)
- Justice Reid (disambiguation)
