= Peter Rede =

Member of the Parliament of England

Peter Rede (c. 1373 – c. 1414) was the member of Parliament for the constituency of Dover for the parliament of 1410.
