= Tommy Read =

English footballer

Personal information
- Full name: Thomas Albert Read
- Date of birth: 2 April 1900
- Place of birth: West Bromwich, England
- Date of death: 1977 (aged 76–77)
- Position: Goalkeeper

Senior career*
Years	Team	Apps	(Gls)
1924–1925	West Cannock Colliery		
1925–1926	Darlaston		
1926–1927	Stockport County	11	(0)
1927–1935	Grimsby Town	247	(0)
1935–1936	Crystal Palace	16	(0)
1936–193?	Shirley Town		
- * Club domestic league appearances and goals

Thomas Albert Read (2 April 1900 – 1977) was an English professional footballer who played as a goalkeeper.
