= Peter Reade =

British sailor (born 1939)

Peter John Chorley Reade (born 14 January 1939) is a British former sailor who competed in the 1964 Summer Olympics.
