= Joan Reede =

American physician (born 1953)

Joan Y. Reede
- Born: 1953 (age 72–73); Boston, MA
- Education: MD, MS, MPH, MBA, ScB, Biochemistry
- Alma mater: Brown University

Joan Y. Reede (born 1953) is an American physician. She is Harvard Medical School's inaugural dean for culture and community engagement in the Office of Culture and Community Engagement (OCCE). She is also a member of the National Academy of Medicine. She is known for creating programs that mentor and support physicians and physician-scientists. Alumni of her programs have created a 501(c)(3) organization called The Reede Scholars in her honor.

== Early life and education ==
Reede was born and raised in Boston, the descendant of slaves from Georgia. Despite discouragement from school officials, she applied to and attended Brown University and graduated in 1977, then went on to Mt. Sinai School of Medicine, graduating in 1980. Reede's mother, Tommye Reede, eventually earned her college degree the same year that Reede graduated from medical school. Reede then moved to Johns Hopkins University School of Medicine to complete a residency in pediatrics before completing a fellowship in child psychiatry at Boston Children's Hospital. Reede returned to school at Harvard later in her career, earning a Master's of Public Health degree in 1990 and a Master's in Policy and Management in 1992, both from the Harvard School of Public Health. She also holds an MBA from Boston University.

== Career and research ==
Reede began her career in community health in Boston, working with incarcerated youth and children in public schools. Throughout her career, she has worked on various efforts to educate teachers and students about health issues. She has also been on several advisory councils for the National Institutes of Health.

In 2001, she was appointed to the new position of dean for diversity and community partnership at Harvard, the first African-American woman dean at Harvard Medical School within the Office of Diversity, Inclusion, and Community Partnership (DICP). She also founded a physician fellowship program for postgraduate education in working with patients. DICP programs at Harvard work collaboratively with others to increase opportunities for individuals to pursue biomedical careers. In 1990, she initiated the Minority Faculty Development Program at Harvard Medical School, which supported the career development of minority faculty. She has initiated three leadership fellowship programs in health policy. Alums of these programs formed a 501(c)(3) alumni association, The Reede Scholars, which is focused on improving human health and wellbeing and to transform health policy through education, research, policy and practice. She has also created research fellowships for Harvard Medical School faculty and postdoctoral researchers.

In 1991, she founded the Biomedical Science Careers Program, that seeks to increase individuals from all backgrounds and walks of life interested in science and medicine while helping health care institutions, biopharma/biotechnology firms, educational institutions, professional organizations and private industry members meet their need for a well-rounded workforce. This program is funded by an annual gala dinner, Evening of Hope. Reede also organizes the annual New England Science Symposium, which highlights the research performed by scientists at many career stages, from undergraduate to post-doctoral.

Her research focuses on national, regional and local strategies that support workforce diversity and inclusion in the biomedical sciences and organizational change. She has performed research on the importance of networking in career progression for medical school faculty and on the barriers that face women, and women of color, in academic medical careers. She has also studied gender and race differences in the receipt of NIH grant awards.

=== Building community ===
Reede has worked to develop community norms at Harvard Medical School and beyond, developing award programs to recognize efforts in community service, exceptional service by staff, and contributions to mentoring. She has also championed internship programs that offer opportunities to students from all backgrounds, particularly disadvantaged backgrounds.

=== National roles ===
Reede's advice is frequently sought at the national level. She has served on the Committee on Minority Health and the Advisory Committee to the Director of the National Institutes of Health, the Board of Governors of the National Institutes of Health Clinical Center, and the External Scientific Panel for NIH’s Enhancing the Diversity of the NIH-funded Workforce Initiative. She has also served on the Advisory Committee to the NIH Deputy Director for Intramural Research. She is a past Chair of the Group on Diversity and Inclusion (GDI) at the Association of American Medical Colleges, and of the National Academy of Medicine Interest Group on Health Populations/Health Disparities.

== Honors and awards ==
- 1986: Health Award, Boston NAACP
- 1993: Community Service Award, Epilepsy Association of Massachusetts
- 1996: Exemplary Models of Administrative Leadership Award, American Association of University Administrators
- 1998: Dean's Award for the Support and Advancement of Diversity Harvard Medical School
- 1998: CDC/University of California Public Health Leadership Institute Scholar Centers for Disease Control
- 2002: Leadership Award National Dental Association
- 2003: Changing the Face of Medicine, Celebrating America’s Women Physicians National Library of Medicine
- 2004: Diggs Lecture, National Institutes of Health
- 2005: Herbert W. Nickens Award, Society of General Internal Medicine
- 2005: Herbert W. Nickens Award, Association of American Medical Colleges
- 2005: Academic Leadership in Primary Care Award, Morehouse School of Medicine
- 2007: Riland Medal for Public Service, New York College of Osteopathic Medicine
- 2007: Honorary Doctorate, New York Institute of Technology
- Board of Directors, National Hispanic Medical Association
- 2009: Member, National Academy of Medicine
- 2011: Diversity Award, Association of Professors of Medicine
- 2012: Elizabeth Beckman Hurlock Award, Elizabeth Hurlock Beckman Award Trust
- 2015: Jacobi Medallion, Icahn School of Medicine at Mount Sinai
- 2016: Health Equity Hero, Delta Dental
- 2017 Commitment to Diversity award, Xconomy
- 2018 Heroes in Health Care award, Visiting Nurse Association.
- 2019 NEHI Innovator in Health Award, Network for Excellence in Health Innovation.
- 2023: Commencement speaker for the Graduating Class of 2023 at Georgetown University School of Medicine
