= Thomas Rede =

Welsh merchant and landowner

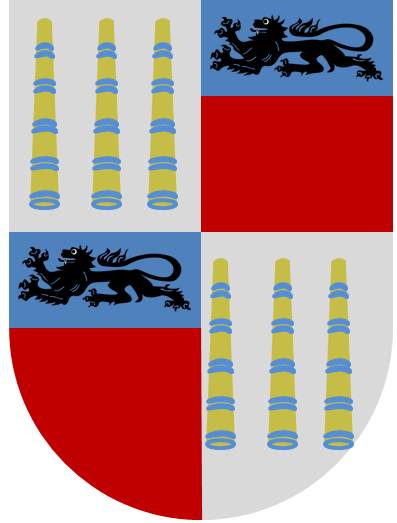
Coat of arms of Thomas Rede of The Roche

Thomas Rede (c. 1390 – c. 1455) was a merchant, landholder, knight and public official of Roche Castle near Laugharne, Carmarthenshire.

== Life ==
He was the son of William Rede and Jonet Wirriot. His father was born about 1370, the bastard son of Thomas Rede, a wealthy merchant of Carmarthen and Bristol. His mother was the daughter of Sir Wilcock Wirriot of Orielton in Pembrokeshire.

Thomas was closely associated with Gruffudd ap Nicholas, a powerful figure in South Wales in the mid-15th century, as well as being Thomas’ father-in-law. In 1446 Thomas and Gruffudd farmed part of Cockmill in Carmarthen, and in 1449 they were involved together in a lease of the town. While not nearly as prominent in politics as his father-in-law, father or grandfather, Thomas did serve as beadle in Widigada from 1451 to 1452, and he was apparently knighted.

Thomas married as his second wife Margred Dwnn, the cousin of his first wife, and daughter of another prominent Carmarthenshire family. By these two wives, and others, he had at least nine children.

Thomas Rede, knight, was buried in Grey Friars church in Carmarthen, along with his father-in-law Gruffudd ap Nicholas and other members of the family. Thomas’ tomb lay on the south side of the choir. His coat of arms is described as: “Thomas Rede of Ye Roche -- quarterly, argent 3 pipes (elsewhere reeds) in fess, banded azure; and on a chief azure a lion passant sable.” The quartered coat of arms is for Wirriot, his mother’s family.

== The Roche ==
Thomas’ principal estate was The Roche, near Talacharn (Laugharne) in Carmarthenshire, which appears on maps today as the ruin of Roche Castle. Later heralds in England rendered it “Rodes Court,” undoubtedly due to the confusion of the distance of time and place.

The Roche was originally known as Machrells Walles, built in the 13th century by John de la Roche. Over the course of the ensuing century the property passed from one family member to another until in 1392 it came into the possession of David Fleming, who immediately granted it to Sir Thomas Fleming, knight and other Irish land owners. Subsequently, according to a successful 16th-century petition of James Reede, gentleman of London, it became the property of Gruffudd Nicholas (Gruffudd ap Nicholas) and Thomas Nicholas, who granted it to William Rede and Jonet Wirriot as part of their marriage settlement.

Decades later, in 1439, perhaps at the death of William who would have been 69 years old, Richard Rede conveyed the property to Thomas Nicoll (Thomas ap Gruffudd ap Nicholas?), “as of the gift of William Rede brother of the said Richard”. A conveyance by fine implies an agreed exchange, so it may have been by previous agreement that Thomas Nicoll conveyed Machrells Walles to William’s son, Richard. In 1452 Richard Rede, esquire, and his wife Maud transferred Machrells Walles and other properties by quitclaim to Richard’s brother, Thomas Rede, esquire. The Roche remained in the family for an additional 120 years until James Rede sold it to Sir John Perrot in 1572.

== Heraldry ==
The coat of arms for Rede of Roche is a pun on the name. It always contains three reeds (golden or silver) on an argent or sable field, and sometimes carries the pun further by adding three roaches (a type of fish) on a red field. The red field might even be considered a pun of the name Rede - one Welsh homonym for Rede being “rhudd,” which means red.
