= Mark E. Reed =

American politician

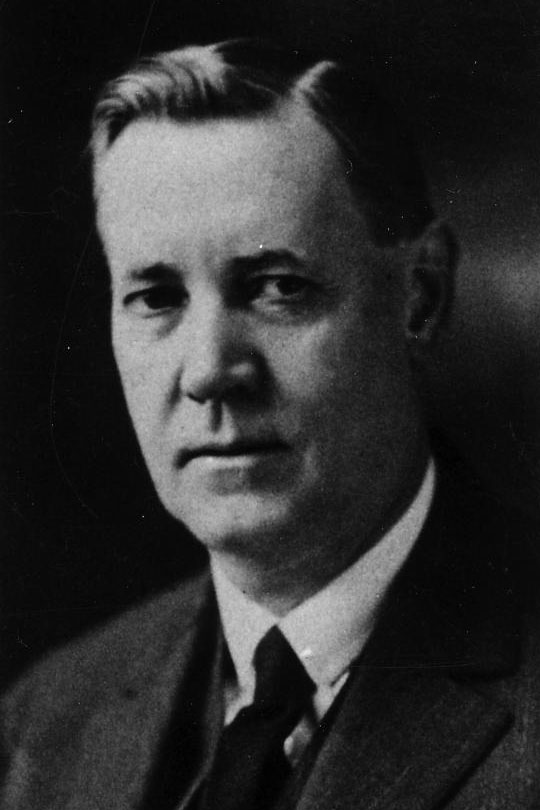
- Reed in 1923

17th Speaker of the Washington House of Representatives
- In office January 8, 1923 – January 12, 1925
- Preceded by: E. H. Guie
- Succeeded by: Floyd B. Danskin

Member of the Washington House of Representatives for the 31st district
- In office 1915–1931

Personal details
- Born: Mark Edward Reed; December 23, 1866 Olympia, Washington, United States
- Died: September 5, 1933 (aged 66) Seattle, Washington, United States
- Party: Republican

Mark Edward Reed (December 23, 1866 – September 5, 1933) was an American lumberman, financier and politician in the state of Washington. He served in the Washington House of Representatives from 1915 to 1931. He was Speaker of the House from 1923 to 1925.

The son of Washington pioneer and government official Thomas M. Reed, Mark E. Reed did not find financial success until 1897 when he was employed by Sol Simpson to help manage the company, Simpson Logging, later called Simpson Investment Company. In 1901, he married Simpson's daughter, Irene. After Simpson died in 1906 Reed assumed control of Simpson Logging. At that time the company employed approximately 300 people working out of five separate camps. By 1914, Reed had full control and transformed the company into a forest-products corporation. In 1925, the company opened its first sawmill, the Reed Mill, and entered the hemlock lumber manufacturing business.

The Reed family currently owns Simpson Investment Company and are the fifth-largest private landowners in the United States, owning 1.37 million acres across California, Washington and Oregon.
