= Willamette Falls =

Waterfall on the Willamette River in Clackamas County, Oregon, United States

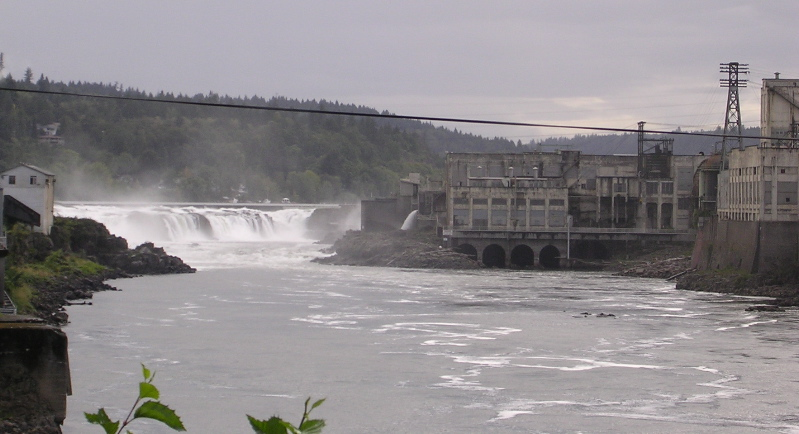
- View from Oregon City in 2004
- Interactive map of Willamette Falls
- Location: Oregon City / West Linn, Clackamas County, Oregon, U.S.
- Coordinates: 45°21′09″N 122°37′03″W
- Type: Block
- Total height: 40 ft (12 m)
- Number of drops: 1
- Average flow rate: 30,850 cu ft/s (874 m^{3}/s)

The Willamette Falls is a natural waterfall in the northwestern United States, located on the Willamette River between Oregon City and West Linn, Oregon. The largest waterfall in the Northwest U.S. by volume, it is the seventeenth widest in the world. Horseshoe in shape, it is 1,500 feet (455 m) wide and forty feet (12 m) high, with a flow rate of 30,850 cu ft/s (874 m^{3}/s). Located 26 miles (42 km) upriver from the Willamette's mouth at Portland, Willamette Falls is a culturally significant site for many tribal communities in the region.

Opened in 1873 and closed since 2011, the Willamette Falls Locks allowed boat traffic on the Willamette to pass into the main Willamette Valley.

== History ==
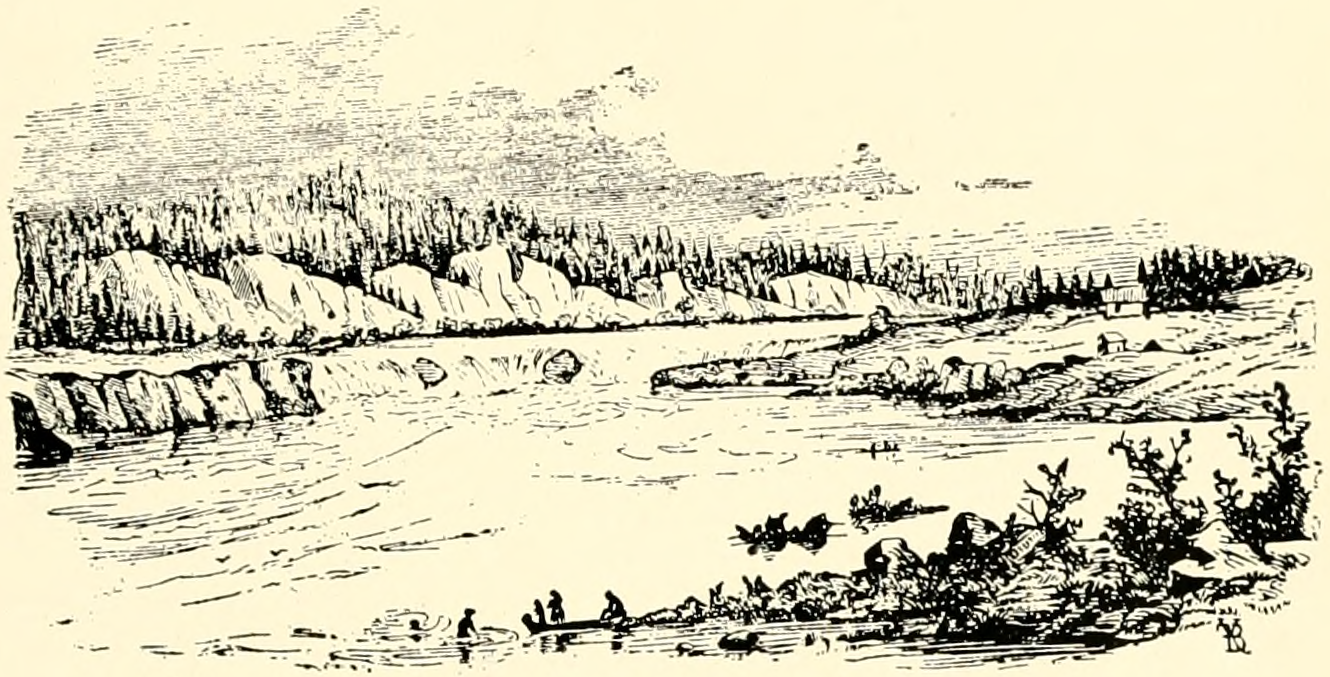
Drawing of the falls prior to development

Native American oral history taught that the falls were placed there by the ancient hero T'allapus (Coyote) so that their people would have fish to eat all winter.· Willamette Falls was once the home to the Charcowah village of the Clowewalla band of Tumwaters or Willamette Band of Tumwaters, an upper Chinookan speaking people. These lands were ceded to the United States Government under the Willamette Valley Treaty of 1855 (signed on January 22, 1855; ratified on March 3, 1855). Tribal members were then removed from these ancestral lands to the Grand Ronde Reservation and the Siletz Indian Reservation.

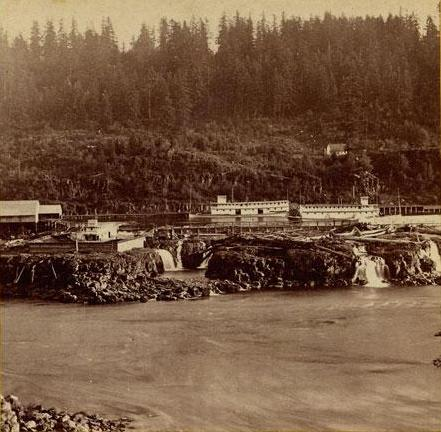
Willamette Falls boat basin in 1867, photograph by Carleton Watkins

Willamette Falls is an important location for many tribes. The abundance of salmon brought tribal communities from all over to fish, trade, and interact at the falls - creating an economic and cultural hub for the region. Each year many tribes harvest ceremonial salmon at Willamette Falls and collect lamprey during the summer, including the Confederated Tribes and Bands of the Yakama Nation, the Confederated Tribes of the Grand Ronde, the Confederated Tribes of Siletz Indians, the Confederated Tribes of the Umatilla Indian Reservation, and the Confederated Tribes of Warm Springs.

European fur traders became aware of the falls in 1810. John McLoughlin established a land claim at the falls in the name of the Hudson's Bay Company in 1829. Oregon City was established in 1842 near the east end of the falls. The town of Linn City was founded on the western shore one year later in 1843. The two towns competed economically, vying for the lucrative steamboat traffic and the trade it generated. With the falls representing the end of the line for boat traffic, river boat captains were forced to choose a side of the river on which they would dock to unload their passengers and goods; some of which would continue their upriver journey on winding portage toll roads. Competition between the towns was fierce until the Great Flood of 1862. Oregon City was inundated and badly damaged, while Linn City was obliterated.

=== Modifications and industrialization ===
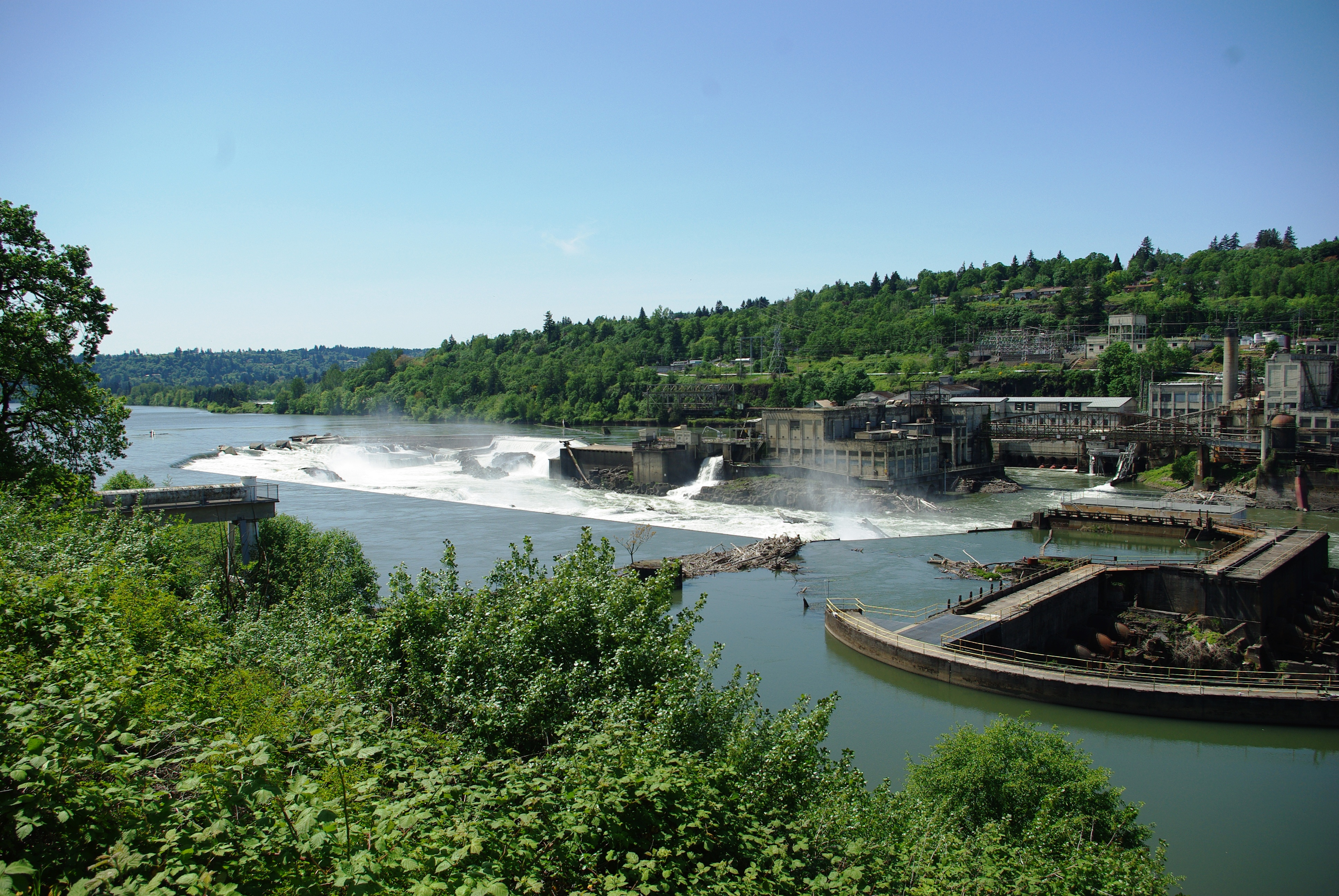
The falls in 2009 from the east with West Linn in the background

Navigating past the falls was not possible until the completion of the Willamette Falls Locks in 1873. During construction of the locks, channels were blasted from the rocks that formerly supported the town of Linn City. Along with the locks, the city of West Linn sits on a portion of the former town site. The locks were sold by the Willamette Falls Canal and Locks Company to the United States Army Corps of Engineers in 1915. They were closed in 2011.

The Willamette Falls Electric Company (later renamed Portland General Electric) was formed in 1888 to build a hydro-electric generation facility at the falls. Four turbine-driven dynamos were built on the east end of the falls. A 14-mile (23-kilometer) long transmission line to Portland was built, becoming the first long-distance transmission of electrical energy in the United States in 1889.

In 1895 Portland General Electric built a second generation station on the west side of the falls. The newer plant, called the T.W.Sullivan Plant (previously Station B), is still in operation with a capacity of 16,000 kilowatts. The foundations of the old plant still remain.

The falls have been home to several paper mills beginning with the Oregon City Paper Manufacturing Co. in 1866. The Willamette Pulp and Paper Co. opened on the West Linn side during 1889. The ownership of the mills has changed several times. The last two remaining mills in 2011 were owned by the West Linn Paper Company and the Blue Heron Paper Company. West Linn Paper Company announced it was shutting down in October 2017, and reopened in November 2019 as Willamette Falls Paper Company. Blue Heron Paper Company closed its mill in February 2011.

The Blue Heron site has subsequently been auctioned off for redevelopment. The milling facilities were sold to a Canadian investment firm, NRI Global, Inc., which has begun work removing the old machinery and cleaning the grounds of contamination. An agreement for the sale of the site itself was announced in June 2013, but later fell apart. In May 2014, another developer, George Heidgerken, purchased the property. Heidgerken then sold the property to the Confederated Tribes of Grand Ronde in August 2019. On December 5, 2020, a fire destroyed one of the buildings in the south of the Blue Heron site; one man was charged with trespassing and arson in connection with the fire. Another fire, likely caused by a makeshift stove, destroyed a building on the site in January 2025.

=== Riverwalk and tumwata village ===
The Willamette Falls Trust was founded in 2015 as a nonprofit organization for fundraising and community engagement to support the Willamette Falls Legacy Project. Initially a collaboration between the state of Oregon, Metro, Clackamas County, and Oregon City, the project announced plans in 2017 to create a riverwalk on the Blue Heron site to allow public access to the falls. In 2019, the Confederated Tribes of Grand Ronde purchased the Blue Heron site from Heidgerken.

In 2021, the Willamette Falls Legacy Project added five confederations—the Confederated Tribes of the Grand Ronde, the Confederated Tribes of Siletz Indians, Confederated Tribes of the Umatilla Indian Reservation, Confederated Tribes of Warm Springs, and the Confederated Tribes and Bands of the Yakama Nation—to the riverwalk project, causing it to be placed on hold. In April 2021, the Confederated Tribes of the Grand Ronde withdrew from the Willamette Falls Trust, citing a lack of progress on the project; in March 2022 they also withdrew from the Willamette Falls Legacy Project. On May 28, 2024, former Oregon governor Kate Brown became president of the trust.

On September 21, 2021, a ceremony was held to celebrate the demolition of the paper mill on the Blue Heron site; a second round of demolition began in April 2022. In 2022, the Confederated Tribes of the Grand Ronde announced the site would be named "tumwata village", in honor of the Clowewalla band of Tumwaters; tumwata is also the name used by Grand Ronde for Willamette Falls, and it means 'waterfall' in Chinook Jargon. The village would be a mixed-use development with office, cultural, and recreational spaces. Groundbreaking for infrastructure for tumwata village occurred on May 28, 2026.

In August 2025, the state awarded a $45 million grant to the Willamette Falls Trust to fund the Inter-Tribal Public Access Project, a development on the West Linn side of the river. Two weeks later, the state awarded a $12.5 million grant for the riverwalk on the Oregon City side of the river. It would move forward as a collaboration between Oregon City and the Confederated Tribes of Grand Ronde.

== Ecology ==
The falls is a horseshoe-shaped, block waterfall caused by a basalt shelf in the river floor. The 40 ft (12 m) high and 1500 ft (457 m) wide falls occur 26 river miles (42 km) upstream from the Willamette's confluence with the Columbia River. Operated by the U.S. Army Corps of Engineers, the lock was a four lock canal and was the oldest continuous operating, multiple lift navigation canal in the United States.

The industrialization of the area led to diminishing salmon and steelhead runs, prompting the construction of a fish ladder in 1882. A new fish ladder, built in 1971, is operated by the Oregon Department of Fish and Wildlife. The estimated spring chinook salmon run for 2007 was 52,000.

== Access ==
The public can view the falls from viewpoints on the bluffs of Oregon City, from a signed viewpoint along Highway 99E, from the Oregon City Bridge, from a viewpoint on northbound I-205, or from boats in the river.

The industrialization precluded public access to the base of the waterfall for well over a century. As of 2017, a process to redevelop the Blue Heron Paper Mill site and provide public access to the area, including a river walk, is underway. The Willamette Falls Trust is coordinating the Willamette Falls Inter-Tribal Public Access Project that is led by a team that includes Tribal Council Members and appointees from several sovereign nations, including the Confederated Tribes and Bands of the Yakama Nation, Confederated Tribes of Siletz Indians, Confederated Tribes of the Umatilla Indian Reservation and Confederated Tribes of the Warm Springs.

== Gallery ==
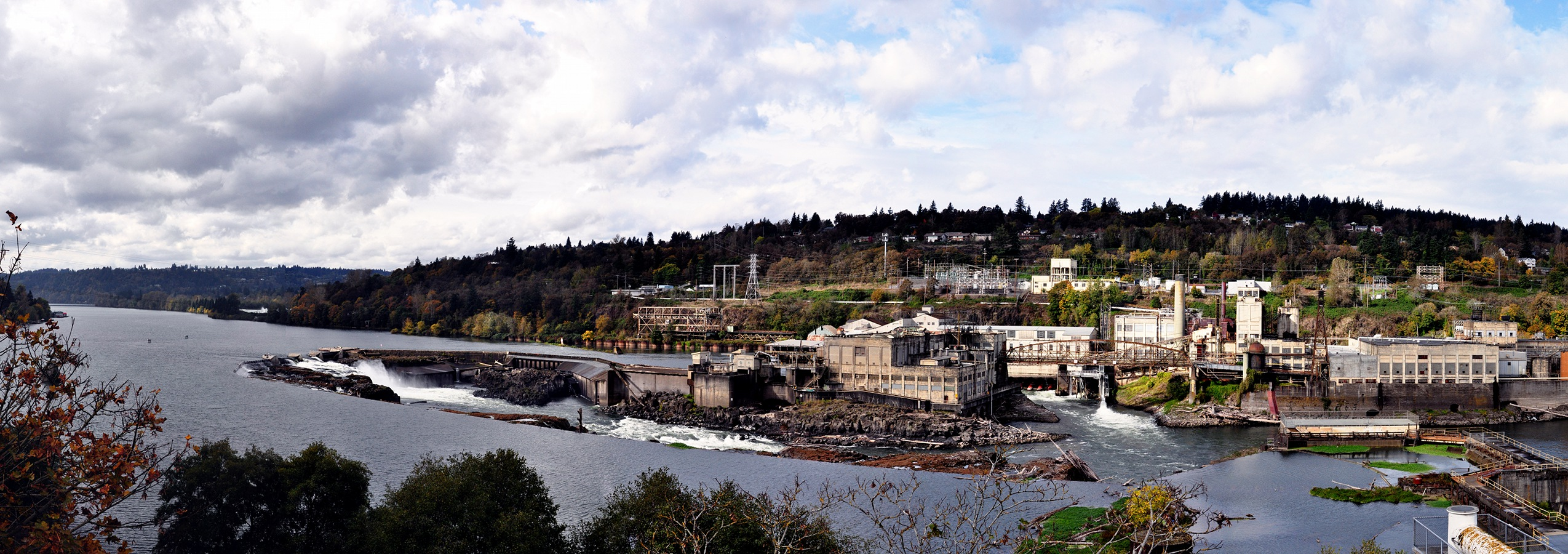
Panorama of the paper mill on October 23, 2010

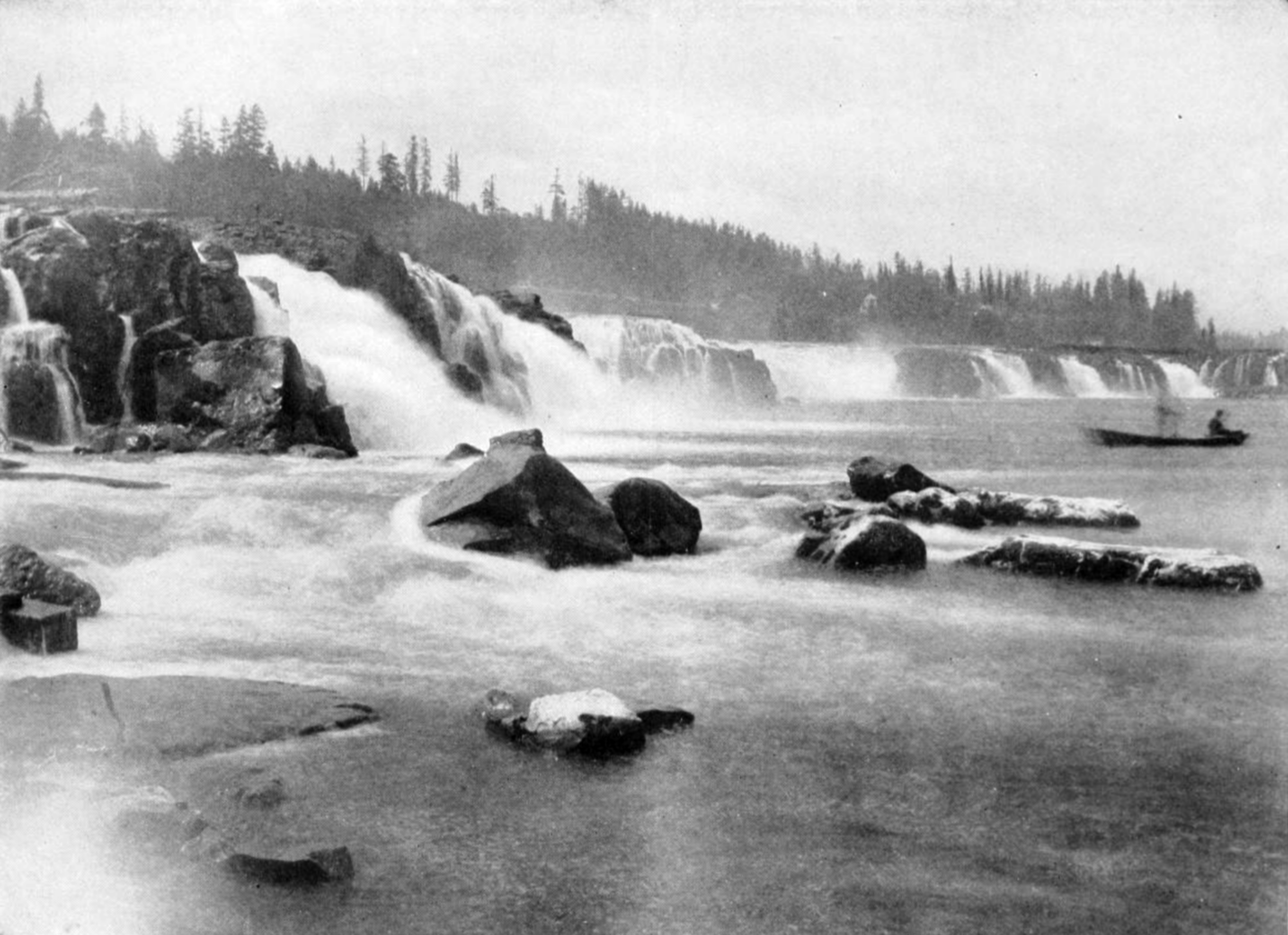
The falls in 1918

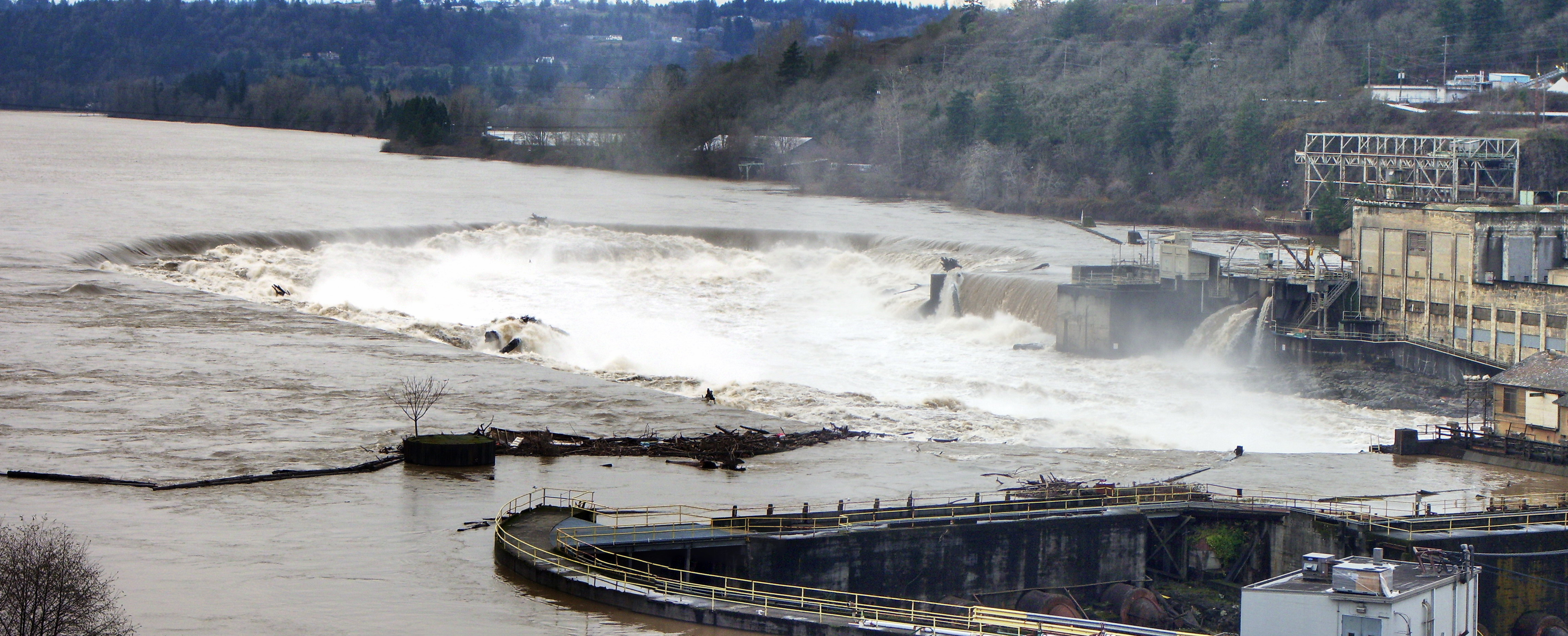
The falls after the Hanukkah Eve windstorm of 2006 swelled the Willamette River and part of the paper mill

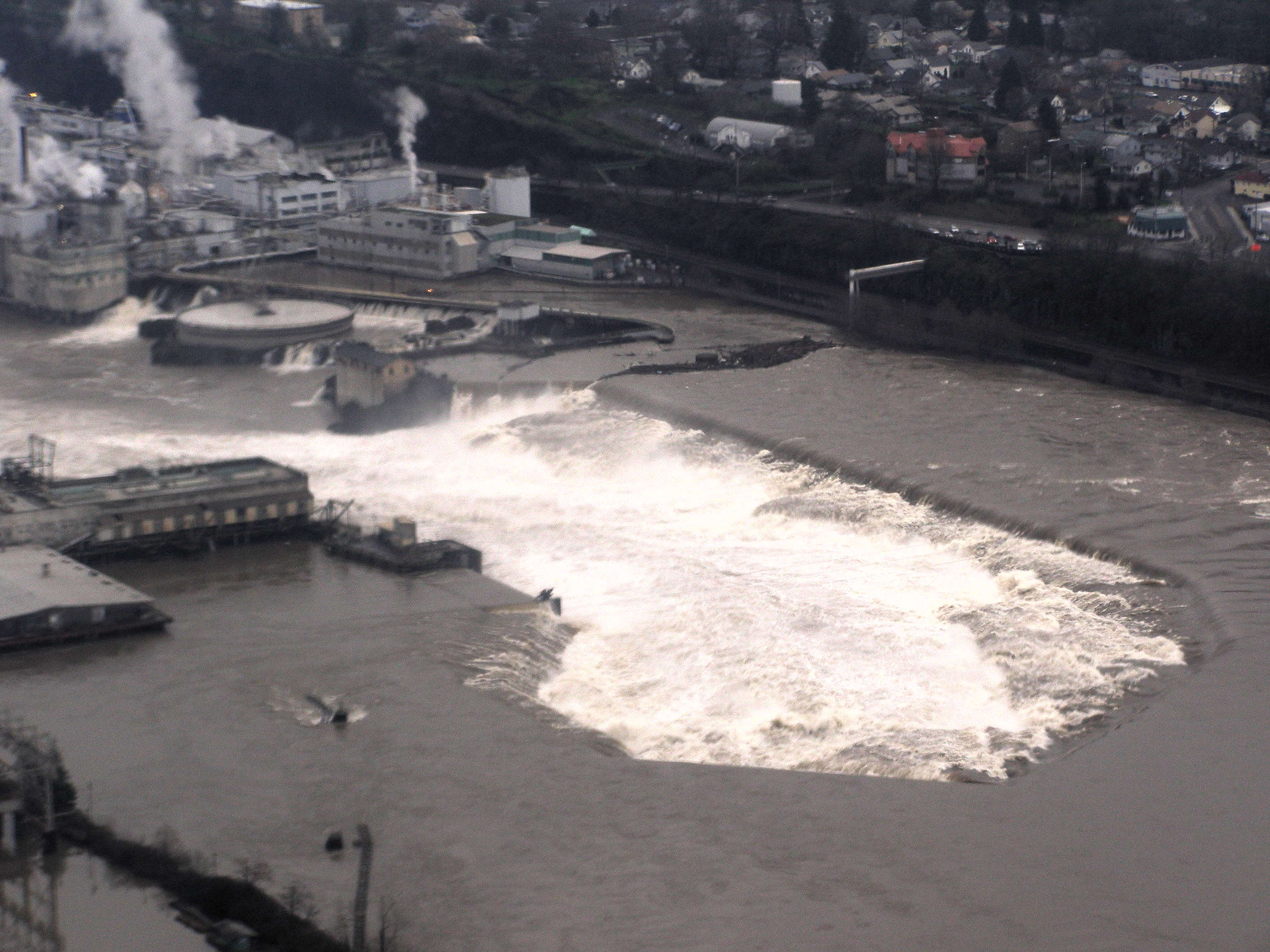
An aerial view of the Willamette Falls with the river near flood stage, taken on January 22, 2006

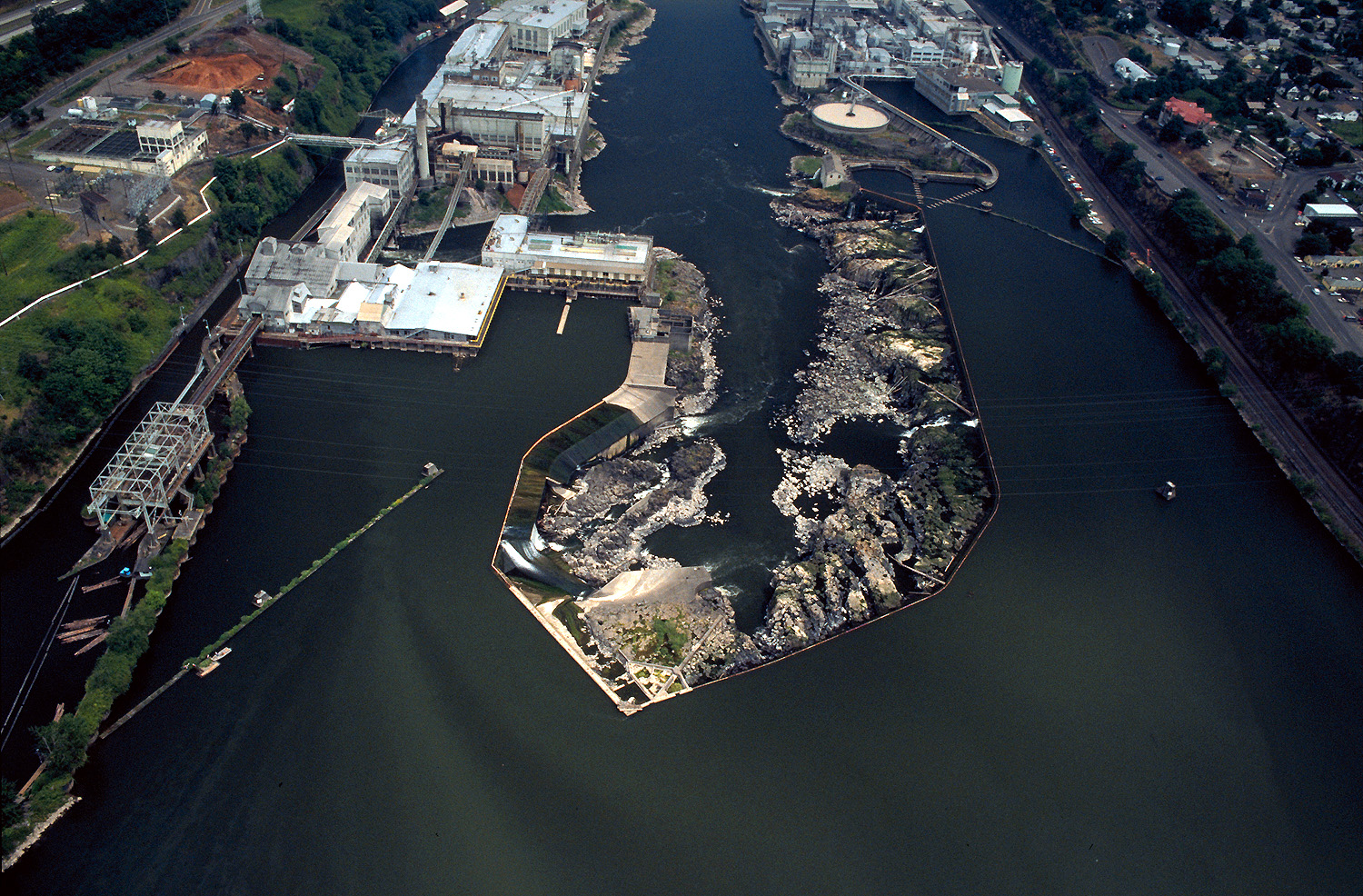
View is downriver facing northeast. The locks are at far left.

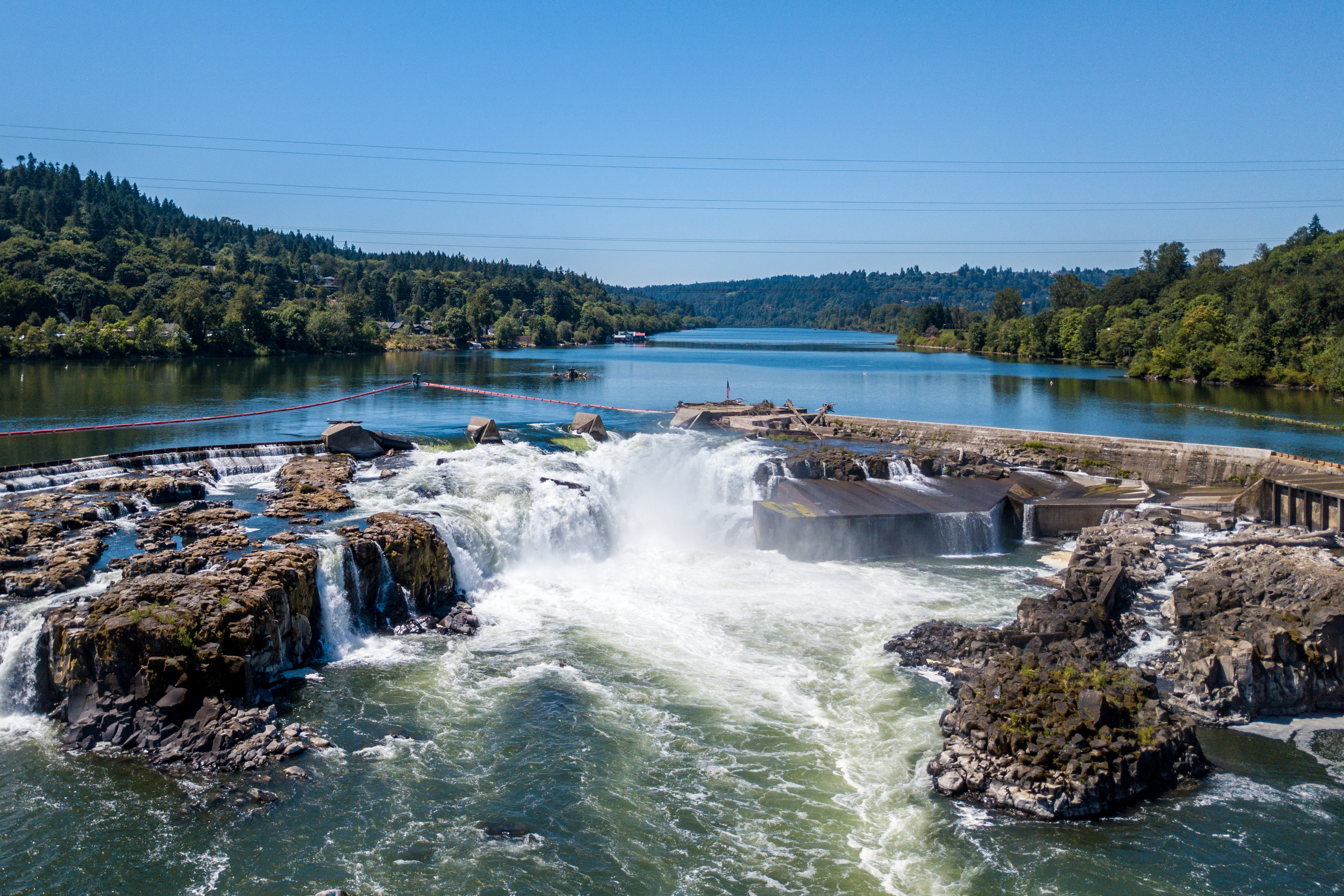
Willamette Falls as seen from overhead via a drone on July 19, 2017

== See also ==
- List of waterfalls
- List of waterfalls in Oregon
- List of waterfalls by flow rate
- tumwata village
