= Tumwata village =

Mixed-use development in the U.S. state of Oregon

tumwata village
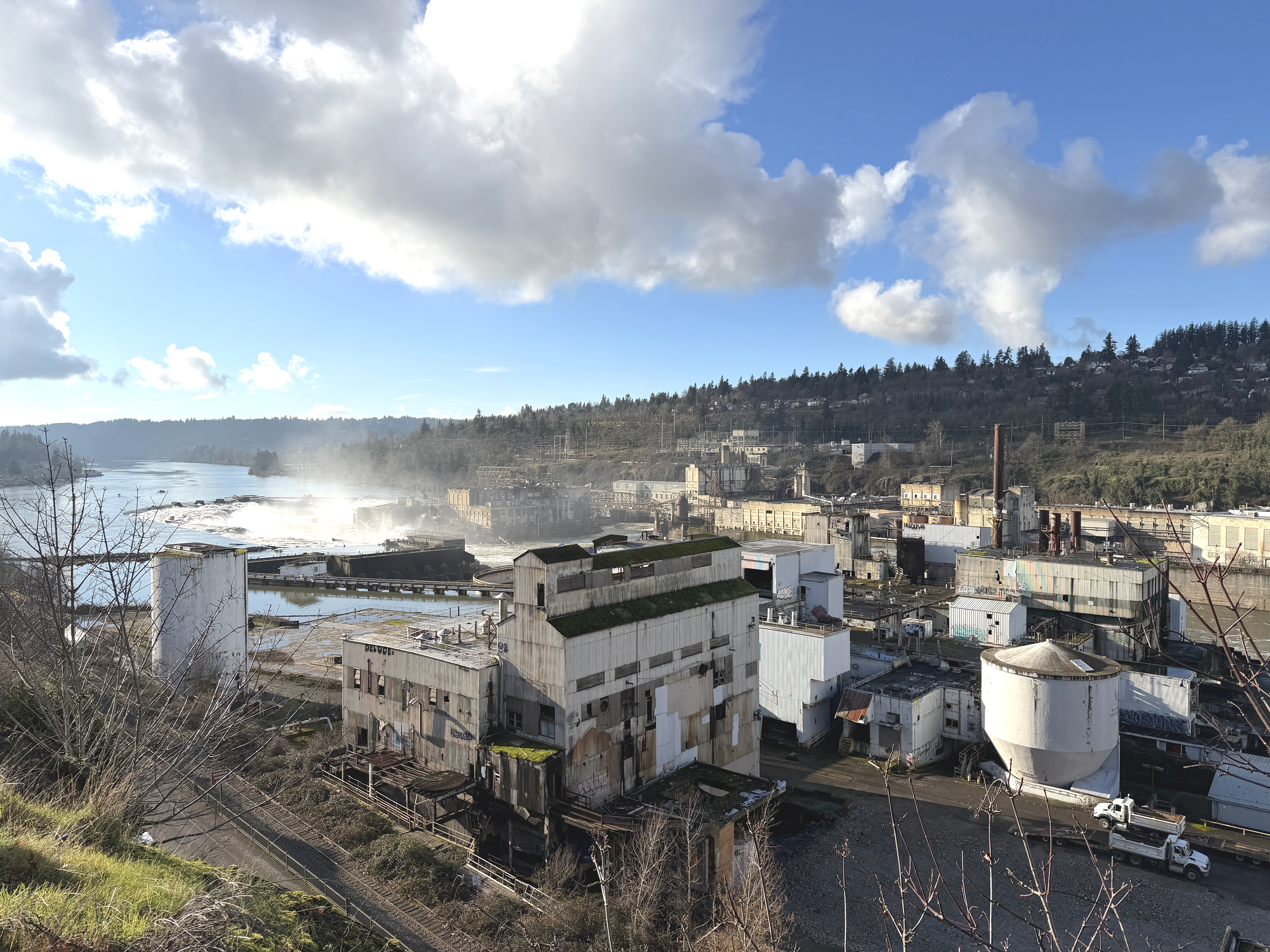
- The former Blue Heron site in January 2026
- Location: Oregon City, Oregon, United States
- Website: tumwatavillage.org

tumwata village is a mixed-use development planned for the 23-acre site (9.3 ha) of the former Blue Heron Paper Company mill atop Willamette Falls in Oregon City, Oregon, United States.

The development is slated to have housing and office buildings, as well as public spaces and restored habitats.

== See also ==
- Native American peoples of Oregon
