= Simpson Investment Company =

American forest products company

- Industry: logging, milling
- Founded: 1890
- Founder: Sol Simpson
- Headquarters: Rainier Tower, Seattle, Washington
- Products: forest products
- Owner: Reed family
- Number of employees: 7,300

The Simpson Investment Company is a privately held holding company based in Seattle, Washington in the US Pacific Northwest that specializes in manufacture of forest products. Founded as a logging company in 1890 by Sol Simpson, the company is now owned by the Reed family.

== Former divisions ==
The Simpson Lumber Company conducted logging operations and was based in Shelton, Washington. Four mills were sold to Interfor and the Shelton property was sold to Sierra Pacific Industries.

The "Simpson Tacoma Kraft Company" produced pulpwood and linerboard products. Previously owned by St. Regis Corporation, the mill on the shore of Commencement Bay was acquired by Simpson in 1985 and sold to RockTenn in 2014; successor WestRock closed the mill in 2023, after 94 years of operation. Near Portland in West Linn, Oregon, Simpson acquired a vintage paper mill from James River in 1990 and operated it until 1996.

In 2008, Simpson announced that it was entering the "green power" industry by building a new power plant at its Tacoma Tideflats mill to generate electricity via the burning of sawmill and other forest waste. Construction of the power plant was completed in August 2009; it generated 55 megawatts of power, which was sold to Iberdrola Renovables and used by the Sacramento Municipal Utility District in northern California.

=== California ===
Simpson was a prominent forest products company in Northern California for much of the 20th century, after first acquiring California timberland in 1945, eventually managing more than 450,000 acres of forest in California, in what was then known as the Redwood Division and is now mostly part of Green Diamond Resource Company, which spun off from Simpson Investment Company in May 2004.

Simpson was most prominent in Humboldt County, with Simpson Timber operating lumber mills in Korbel, Brainard, Orick, and Klamath, a remanufacturing facility and chip dock in Samoa and Simpson Paper operating pulp and paper mills in Samoa and Eureka. Significant portions of the original 1968 Redwood National and State Parks and its 1977 expansion were former Simpson Timber Company land. Simpson Timber also ran the Arcata and Mad River Railroad for over 30 years.

=== Railroad ===
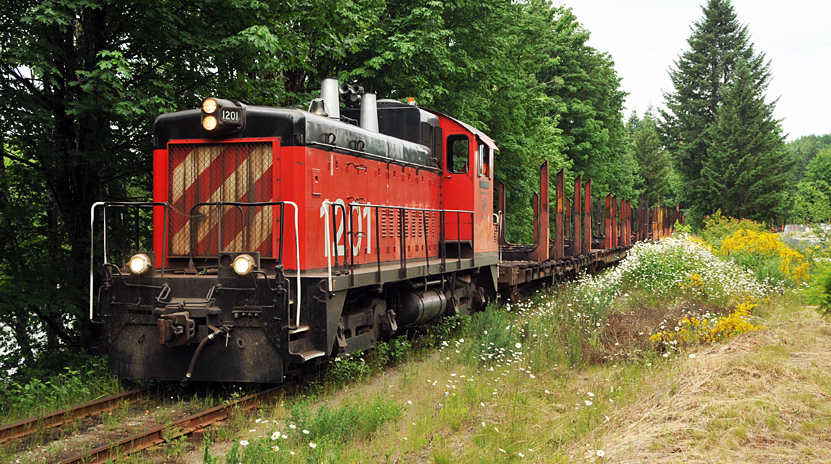
Simpson train in 2011

The Simpson Company built and operated a logging railroad known as the Simpson Railroad. When it closed in July 2015 it was the last logging railroad operations in the continental United States, and dates back 120 years. The railroad was once extensive and branched out into several hundred miles of forestland in the Olympic Peninsula but at the end was limited to just ten miles of operational track. The rail line was to transport lumber and as a transportation network to remote logging camps and towns. Construction of the railroad line was an engineering feat as demonstrated by the large and complex bridges built to span gorges and the mountainous terrain the railroad traveled through. The Vance Creek Bridge and the High Steel Bridge were built in 1929 and used until 1985 when the line was abandoned. The Vance Creek Bridge still stands, and the High Steel Bridge is still in use as a forest road. The High Steel Bridge is one of the tallest rail bridges in the United States and has been listed in the National Register of Historic Places.

In January 2019, Green Diamond Resources leased the railroad's remaining 10 miles, plus sidings, to the Peninsular Railway and Lumbermen's Museum, a locally based 501(c)3 non-profit organization. The all-volunteer group is advancing plans to operate several Simpson locomotives and other rolling stock for tourist trains designed to highlight the significant role lumbering and the railroad played in developing the economies of the local area, the Olympic Peninsula, and the entire Pacific Northwest. The name “Simpson Railroad” and associated graphics and logos have been licensed by Simpson for the museum's use.
