= Mary S. Young State Recreation Area =

Park in Oregon, United States

Mary S. Young Park
- Location within Oregon
- Type: Public, city
- Location: West Linn, Clackamas County, Oregon
- Coordinates: 45°22′22″N 122°37′05″W
- Operator: West Linn Parks and Recreation

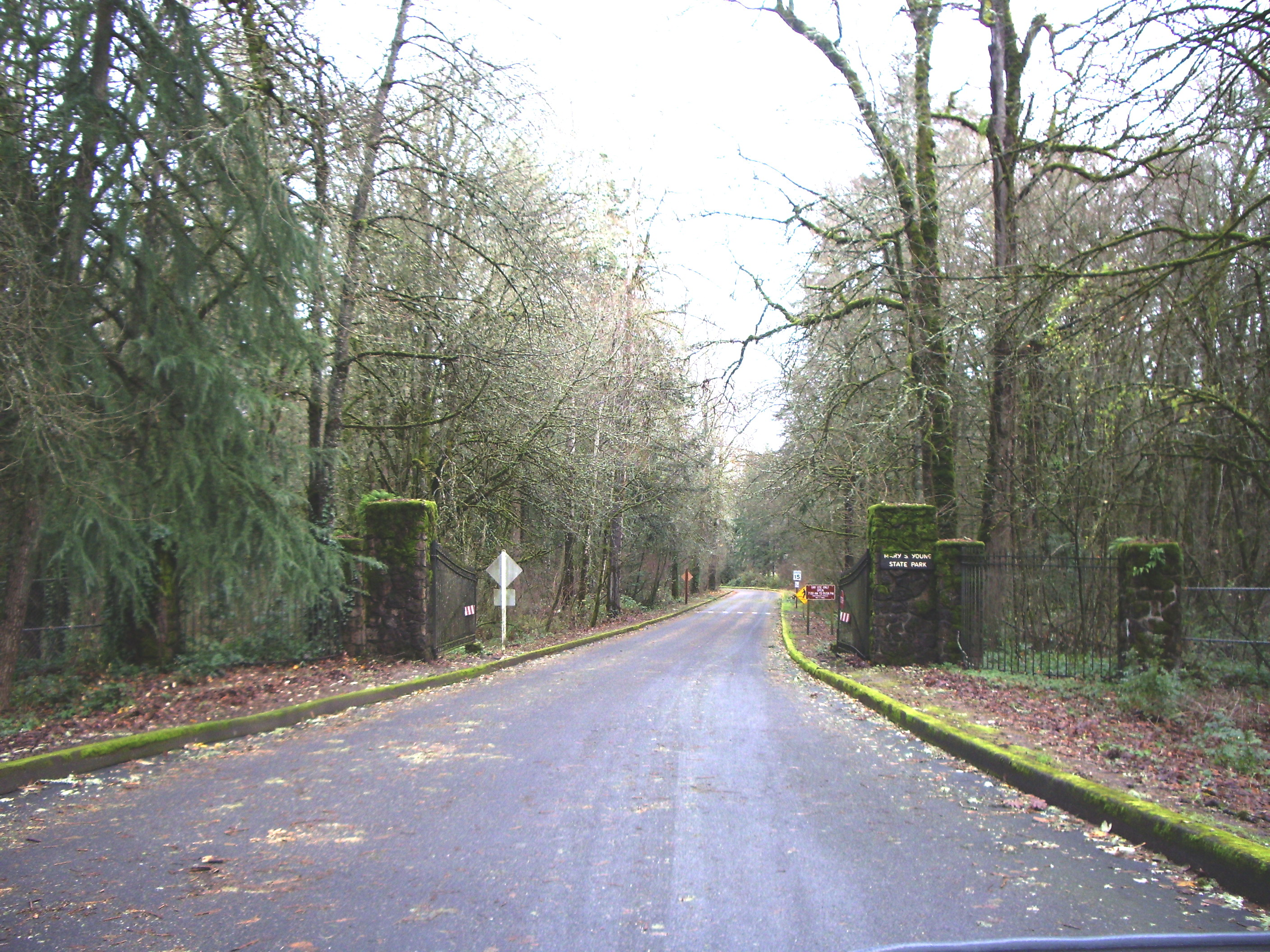
The entrance reflects the park's established roots.

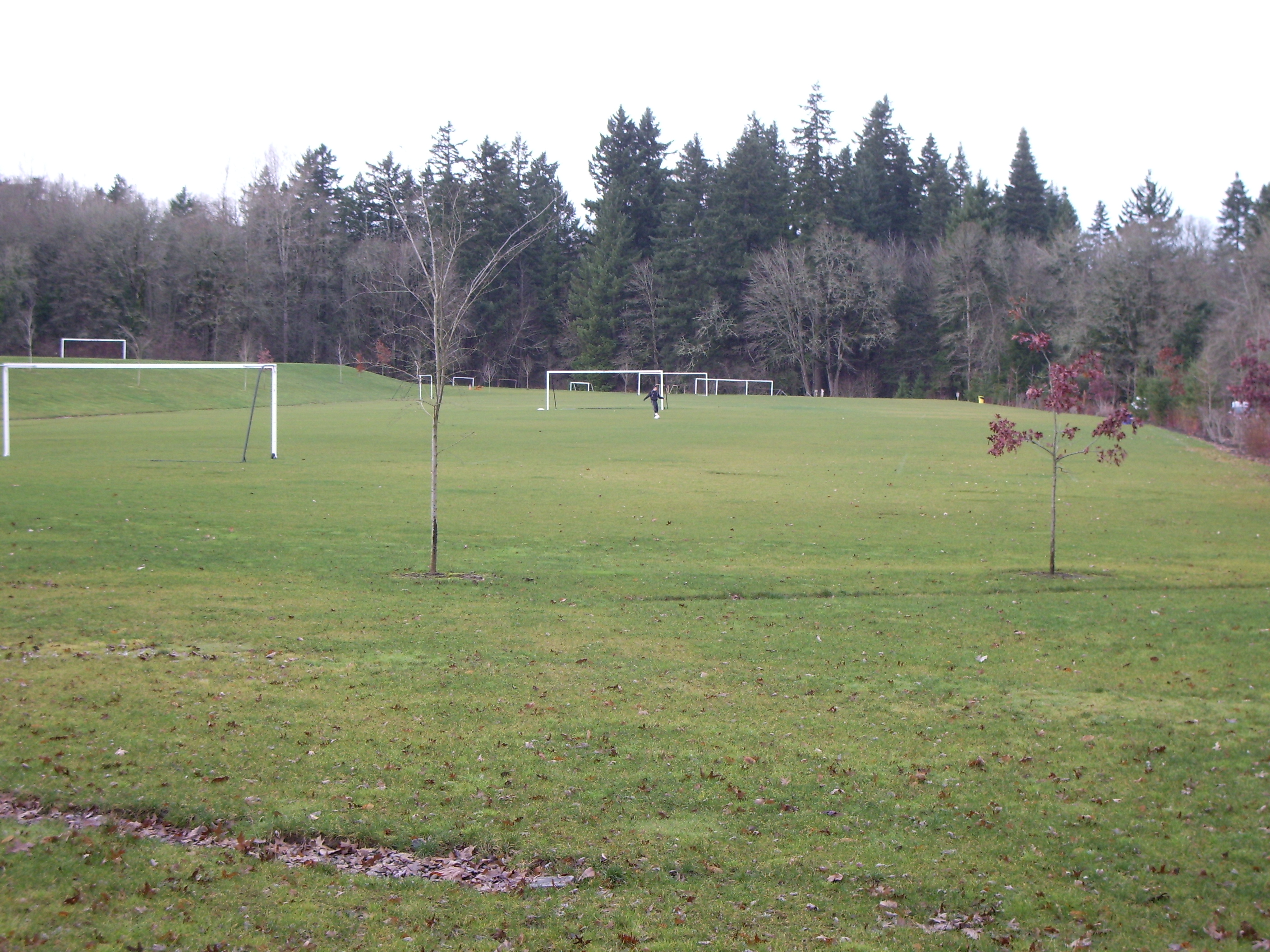
The sports field is large enough for several soccer fields.

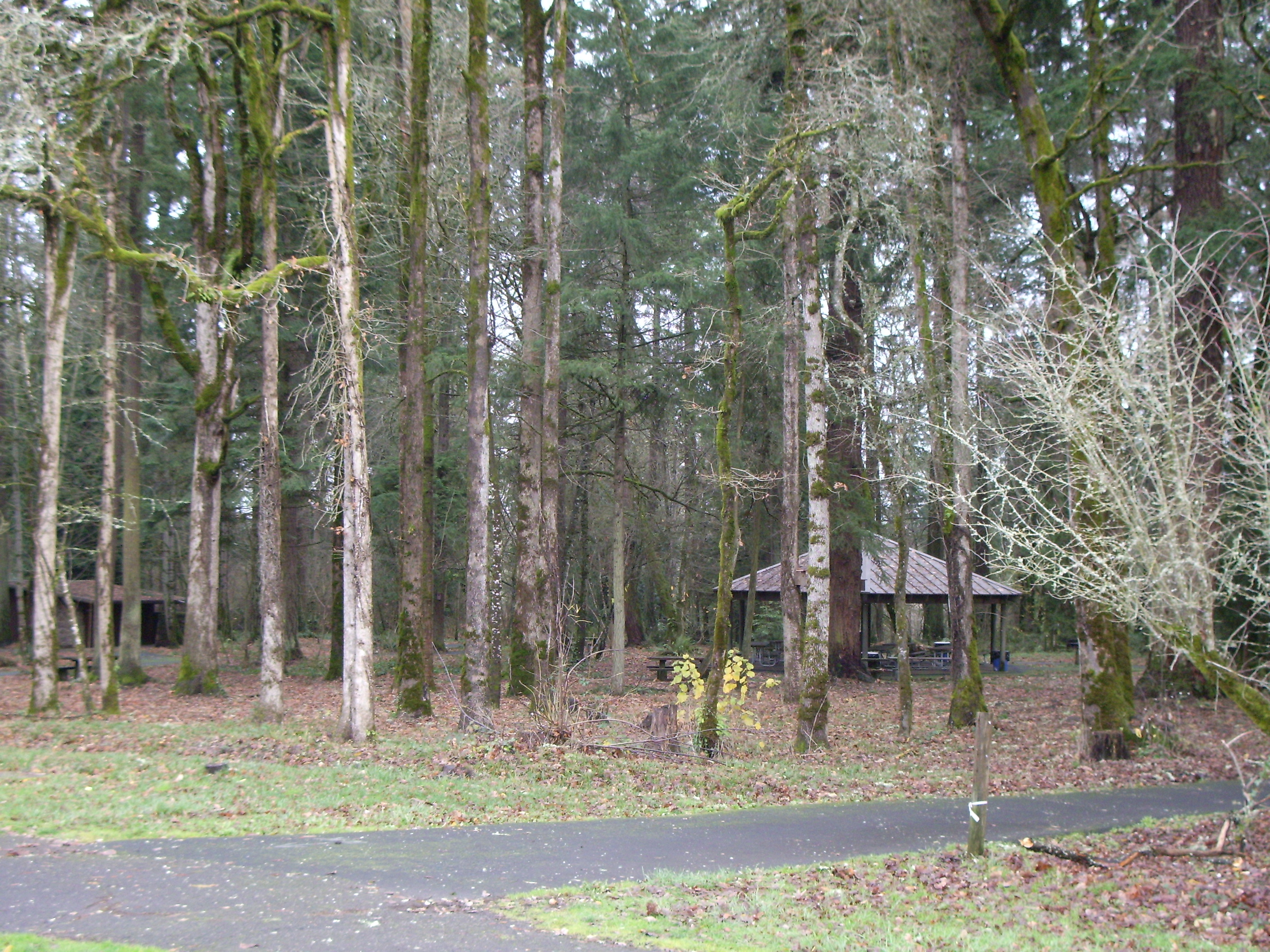
This picnic shelter may be reserved. Other picnic tables are scattered among the trees.

Mary S. Young Park is a city park in the U.S. state of Oregon. It is located within the city of West Linn, alongside the Willamette River, and is heavily wooded. It offers more than five miles of hiking trails, bicycle trails, picnicking, bird watching, fishing, sports fields, and a very popular dog off-leash area.

The park was created via a donation by Mary Scarborough Young and her husband Thomas E. Young. It was named after Mrs. Young and dedicated on August 7, 1973. It was once owned by the Oregon Parks and Recreation Department, but is now owned and operated by the West Linn Parks and Recreation.

"Mary S. Young Park offers you a peaceful place to walk or sit by the Willamette River. About 128 acres, this quiet, forested park is a favorite for urban birders. As you walk deeper into the forest on the numerous trails (5-8 miles worth), it’s easy to forget you’re in a city."

"It's a quick but refreshing stop if you don't have time for a drive to the country. Plenty of room for kids to play on the sports fields, a restroom, shelter (that can be reserved), and an area for dogs to run unleashed."

== See also ==
- West Linn, Oregon
- List of rivers in Oregon
