= Vance Creek Bridge =

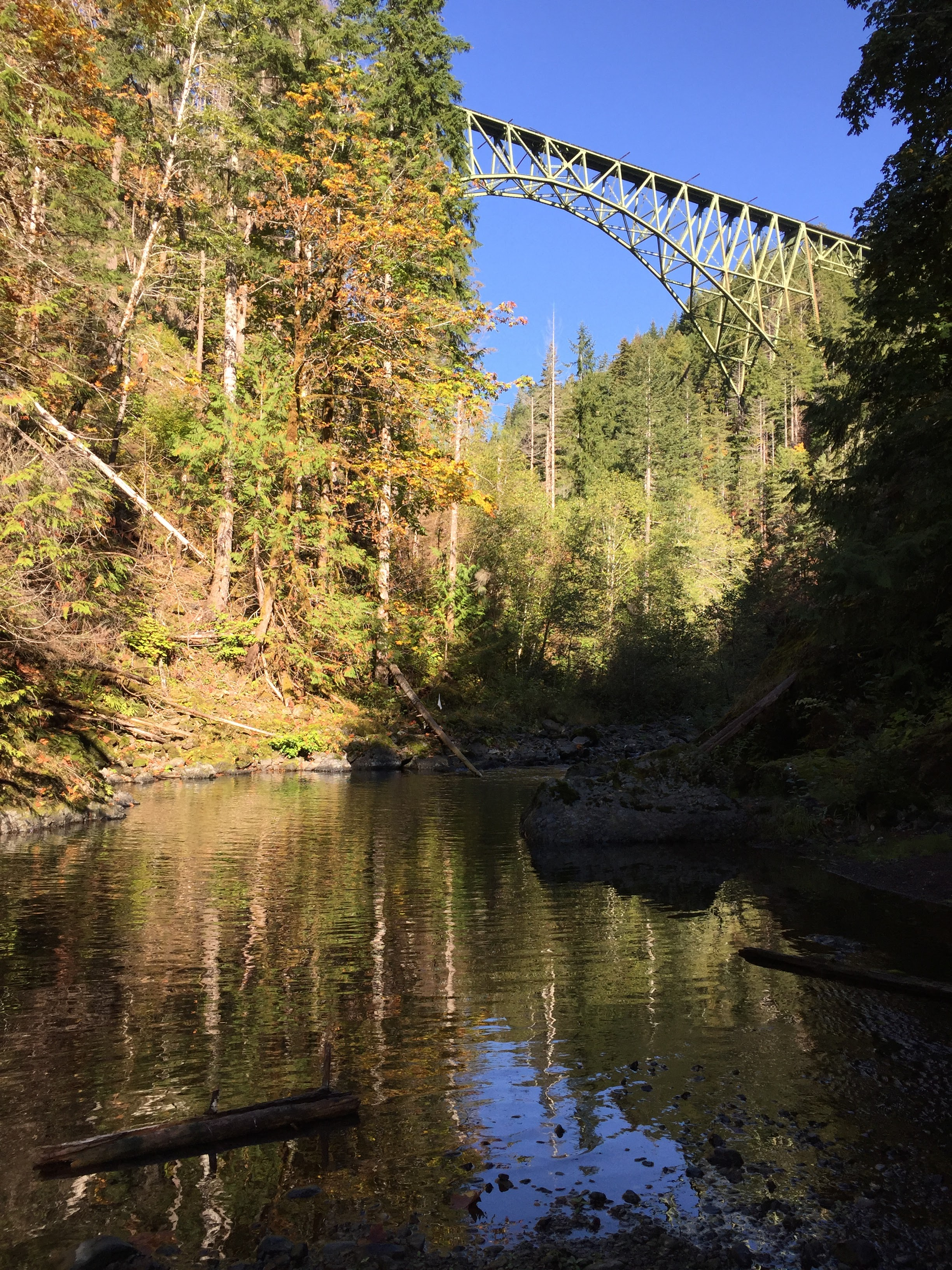
- Vance Creek Bridge
- Coordinates: 47°20′04.7″N 123°19′18.2″W
- Crosses: Vance Creek
- Locale: Mason County, Washington
- Other name: Vance Creek Viaduct
- Owner: Simpson Logging Company (1929-2006); Green Diamond Resource Company (2006-Today)

Characteristics
- Material: Steel
- Total length: 827 feet (252 m)
- Height: 347 feet (106 m)
- Longest span: 422 feet (129 m)

History
- Architect: American Bridge Company
- Construction start: 1928
- Opened: 1929
- Closed: 1970s
- Vance Creek Bridge
- U.S. National Register of Historic Places
- Location within Washington (state)
- Nearest city: Shelton, Washington
- Coordinates: 47°20′04.7″N 123°19′18.2″W
- Built: 1928–1929
- Architect: American Bridge Company
- Architectural style: steel arch
- NRHP reference No.: 82004266
- Added to NRHP: July 16, 1982

Location
- Interactive map of Vance Creek Bridge

The Vance Creek Bridge is an arch bridge in the Satsop Hills of Mason County, Washington that was built for a logging railroad owned by the Simpson Logging Company in 1929. At 347 feet (106 m) in height, it is the second-highest railroad arch in the United States after the nearby High Steel Bridge. It was decommissioned in the 1970s, during the decline of logging on the Olympic Peninsula.

The bridge was added to the National Register of Historic Places in 1982 and to the Mason County Historic Preservation Register in 2008.

== Recent popularity ==
The bridge gained popularity in the early 2010s as an attraction for photographers and thrill-seekers, due to its isolation and "unsafe" features, despite the bridge never having been open to the public. In 2014, the property owner Green Diamond Resource Company added barriers and surveillance to prevent further trespassing due to the emergence of graffiti and arson at the site, as well as the risk of a lawsuit. In 2016, the approach structure's wooden deck and railroad ties were removed to further deter trespassers.

=== Future ===
Green Diamond has stated they are not interested in demolishing the bridge as doing so would be prohibitively expensive and damage the sensitive riparian environment it's built over. They also stated they're not interested in establishing a scenic railroad or any other attraction at the bridge themselves, as they wish to focus solely on their timber business.

In 2013, Green Diamond opened up talks with Mason County Parks and a local bungee jumping company about leasing the bridge to the company. The bridge deck would be rehabilitated into a pedestrian crossing with a bungee jumping spot established mid-deck, similar to the Bridge to Nowhere in California. Green Diamond also approached Washington State Parks on opening the bridge to the public as a tourist attraction, but negotiations fell through due to a lack of funding and suitable insurance. As of August 2018, negotiations between Green Diamond, Mason County Parks, and a local bungee jumping company are still ongoing.

== Gallery ==
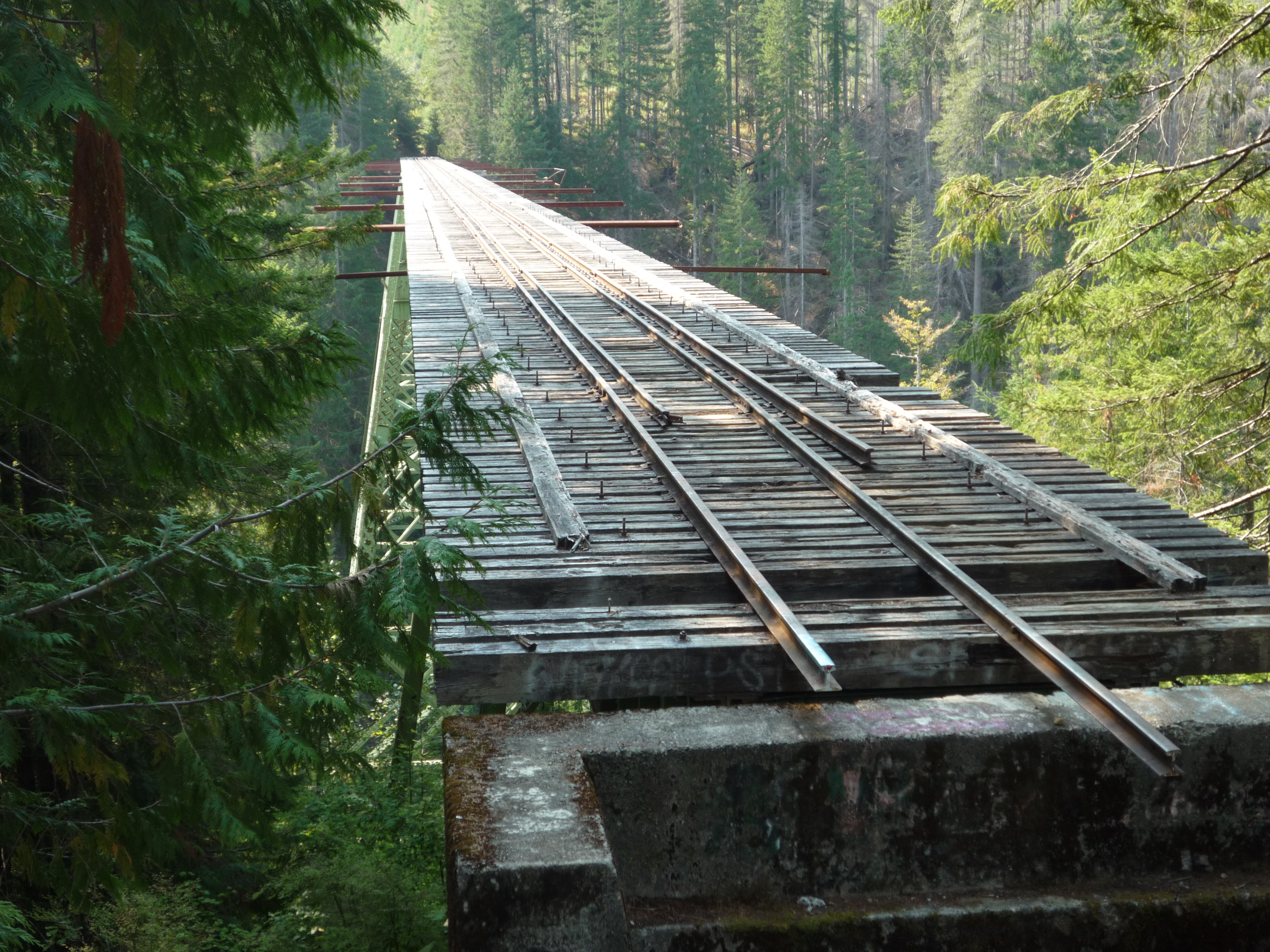
Bridge deck in 2012

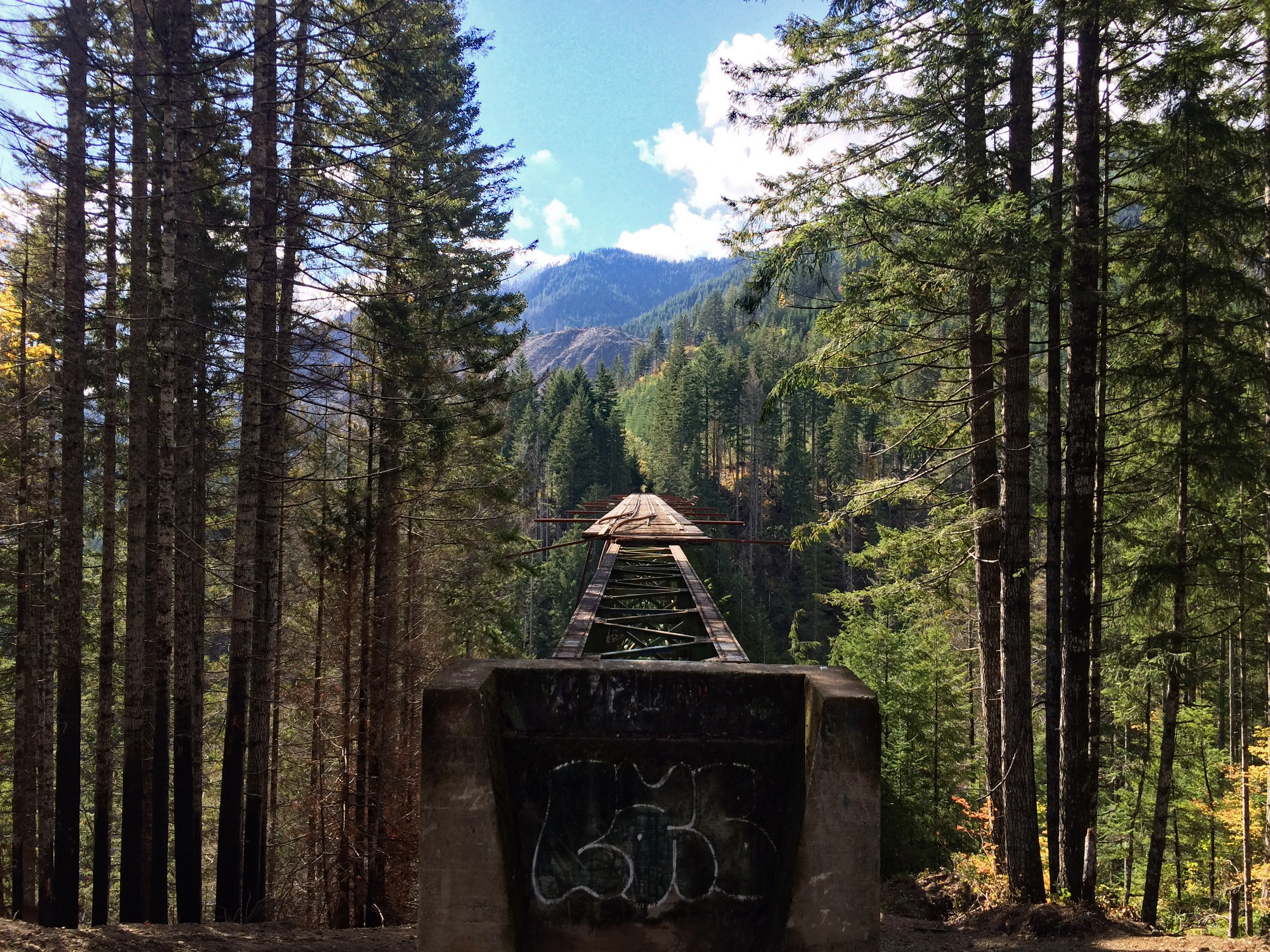
Bridge deck in 2016

== See also ==
- List of bridges in the United States by height
