= West Linn, Oregon =

West Linn
- City
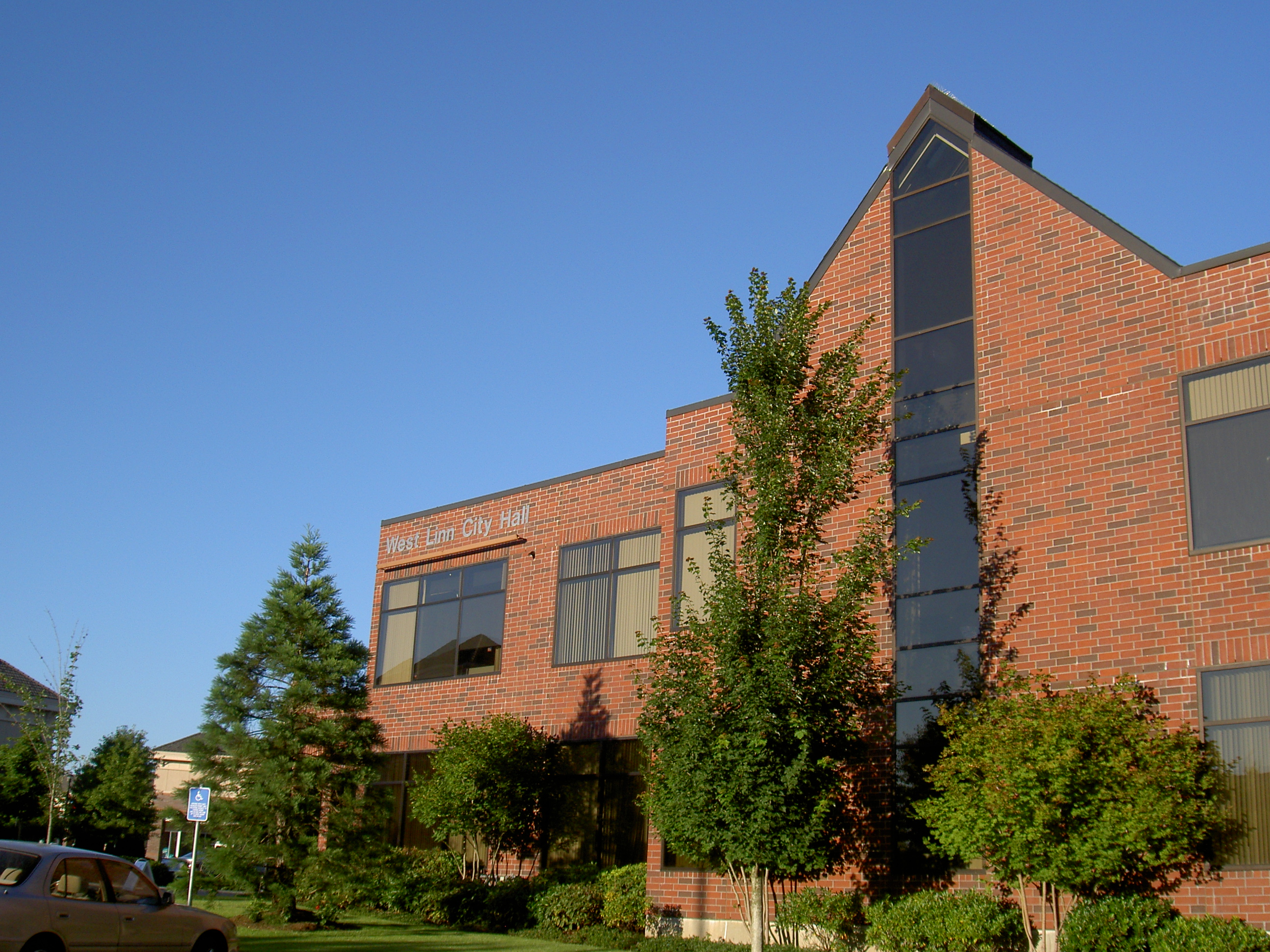
- West Linn City Hall

- Flag Seal
- Motto: City of Hills, Trees and Rivers
- Location in Oregon
- Coordinates: 45°21′55″N 122°38′28″W
- Country: United States
- State: Oregon
- County: Clackamas
- Incorporated: 1913
- Named for: Lewis F. Linn

Government
  - Type: Mayor–council government
  - Mayor: Rory Bialostosky

Area
  - Total: 8.11 sq mi (21.00 km^{2})
  - Land: 7.43 sq mi (19.24 km^{2})
  - Water: 0.68 sq mi (1.76 km^{2})
- Elevation: 679 ft (207 m)

Population (2020)
  - Total: 27,373
  - Density: 3,684.2/sq mi (1,422.47/km^{2})
- Time zone: UTC-8 (Pacific)
  - Summer (DST): UTC-7 (Pacific)
- ZIP code: 97068
- Area codes: 503 and 971
- FIPS code: 41-80150
- GNIS feature ID: 2412224
- Website: westlinnoregon.gov

West Linn is a city in Clackamas County, Oregon, United States. A southern suburb in the Portland metropolitan area, West Linn developed on the site of the former Linn City, which was named after US Senator Lewis F. Linn, who had advocated the American occupation of Oregon Country as a counterclaim to the British.

The T. W. Sullivan Hydroelectric Plant opened in 1889, and harvested energy from nearby Willamette Falls. The adjacent Willamette Falls Pulp and Paper Company began operations the same year.

As of the 2020 census, the city had a population of 27,373.

== History ==
Before its settlement by Oregon pioneers, the area that became West Linn was home to ancestors of some of the present-day Confederated Tribes of the Grand Ronde Community of Oregon.

=== 19th century ===
Major Robert Moore was an early settler who arrived in 1839—before the Champoeg Meetings—having been the senior member of the first attempt to create an American state in Oregon, the Peoria Party. After journeying around the Willamette Valley and Columbia Basin, Moore bought title to about 1,000 acres (400 ha) on the west side of Willamette Falls, across the Willamette River from Oregon City, from Native American Chief Wanaxha of the Wallamut Tribe, on which he platted a town he called "Robin's Nest" in 1843. He also filed a provisional claim with the then government of the Oregon Country, not knowing whether the eventual governing laws would honor his transaction. The Oregon Territorial Legislature voted to rename it Linn City on December 22, 1845, as a memorial to Senator Lewis F. Linn, after whom Linn County is also named. Linn was a neighbor and family friend of the Moores from their time as settlers in the early Missouri Territory.

For many years Linn City was a political and commercial rival to the adjacent town of Oregon City, but it suffered a series of natural and man-made setbacks. A major fire and the Great Flood of 1862 halted the pioneer settlement in 1861, dispersing many of the surviving family members throughout the Pacific Northwest.

The Willamette Falls Locks and canal were completed in 1873, making the waterfall passable by river traffic. The locks closed in 2011 with no plans to reopen.

The Willamette Falls Pulp and Paper Company began operation in 1889.

=== 20th century ===
West Linn was incorporated in 1913 and in 1916 merged with the adjacent town of Willamette, which had incorporated five years earlier. When the City of West Linn incorporated in 1913, it encompassed West Oregon City, Bolton, Sunset and Willamette Heights. The incorporation allowed the settlements to obtain needed services, utilities, and improvements without annexing to Oregon City. After considerable debate about naming, the city founders decided to honor the pioneer town Moore had established.

The Oregon City Bridge was built in 1922.

The city's population grew for decades, but has recently leveled off. The 1860 census listed 225 residents. By 1920, the number had grown to 1,628. The 1960 census put the population at 2,923, and by 1970, West Linn had grown to more than 7,000. The population is now 25,250.

In 2022, Rory Bialostosky became West Linn's youngest mayor, at 23.

== Geography ==
According to the United States Census Bureau, the city has an area of 8.05 square miles (20.85 km^{2}), of which 7.39 square miles (19.14 km^{2}) is land and 0.66 square miles (1.71 km^{2}) is water. The city is between the Willamette and Tualatin rivers; it includes the former townsites/developments of Willamette, Bolton, Multnomah City, Sunset City, and West Oregon City. Willamette was incorporated in 1908, the City of West Linn was incorporated in 1913, and the two towns merged in 1916. Later annexations brought in the Cedaroak, Marylhurst, and Hidden Springs neighborhoods. Infill created the Tanner Basin and Tannler neighborhoods.

The Nature Conservancy maintains the Camassia Natural Area in central West Linn as one of its conservancy preserves. The 26-acre (11 ha)-area is on a rocky plateau exposed by the Bretz Floods and now named after the camas that bloom there in spring; it hosts about 300 other species, including the white rock larkspur, a species found in only a half dozen other places in the world. It supports Oregon white oak-madrone woodlands, a stand of quaking aspen, wet meadows, ponds, and vernal pools.

The Mary S. Young State Recreation Area, between Oregon Route 43 and the Willamette River, features a large off leash dog area, soccer fields, and 5–8 miles of trails.

West Linn is in the area where the Missoula Floods placed the Willamette Meteorite.

=== Climate ===
Extremes range from −2 °F (−19 °C), recorded in 1950, to 107 °F (42 °C), recorded in 1956 and 1981.

Climate data for West Linn, OR
Month	Jan	Feb	Mar	Apr	May	Jun	Jul	Aug	Sep	Oct	Nov	Dec	Year
Record high °F (°C)	66 (19)	75 (24)	81 (27)	92 (33)	104 (40)	115 (46)	107 (42)	107 (42)	105 (41)	96 (36)	73 (23)	68 (20)	107 (42)
Mean daily maximum °F (°C)	49 (9)	53 (12)	58 (14)	64 (18)	70 (21)	76 (24)	83 (28)	84 (29)	78 (26)	65 (18)	53 (12)	47 (8)	65 (18)
Mean daily minimum °F (°C)	37 (3)	37 (3)	40 (4)	43 (6)	48 (9)	53 (12)	56 (13)	56 (13)	52 (11)	46 (8)	40 (4)	35 (2)	45 (7)
Record low °F (°C)	−2 (−19)	6 (−14)	22 (−6)	28 (−2)	31 (−1)	37 (3)	41 (5)	41 (5)	33 (1)	24 (−4)	9 (−13)	6 (−14)	−2 (−19)
Average precipitation inches (mm)	6.78 (172)	4.78 (121)	4.67 (119)	3.47 (88)	2.46 (62)	1.74 (44)	0.65 (17)	0.72 (18)	1.61 (41)	3.61 (92)	6.56 (167)	7.32 (186)	44.37 (1,127)

== Demographics ==
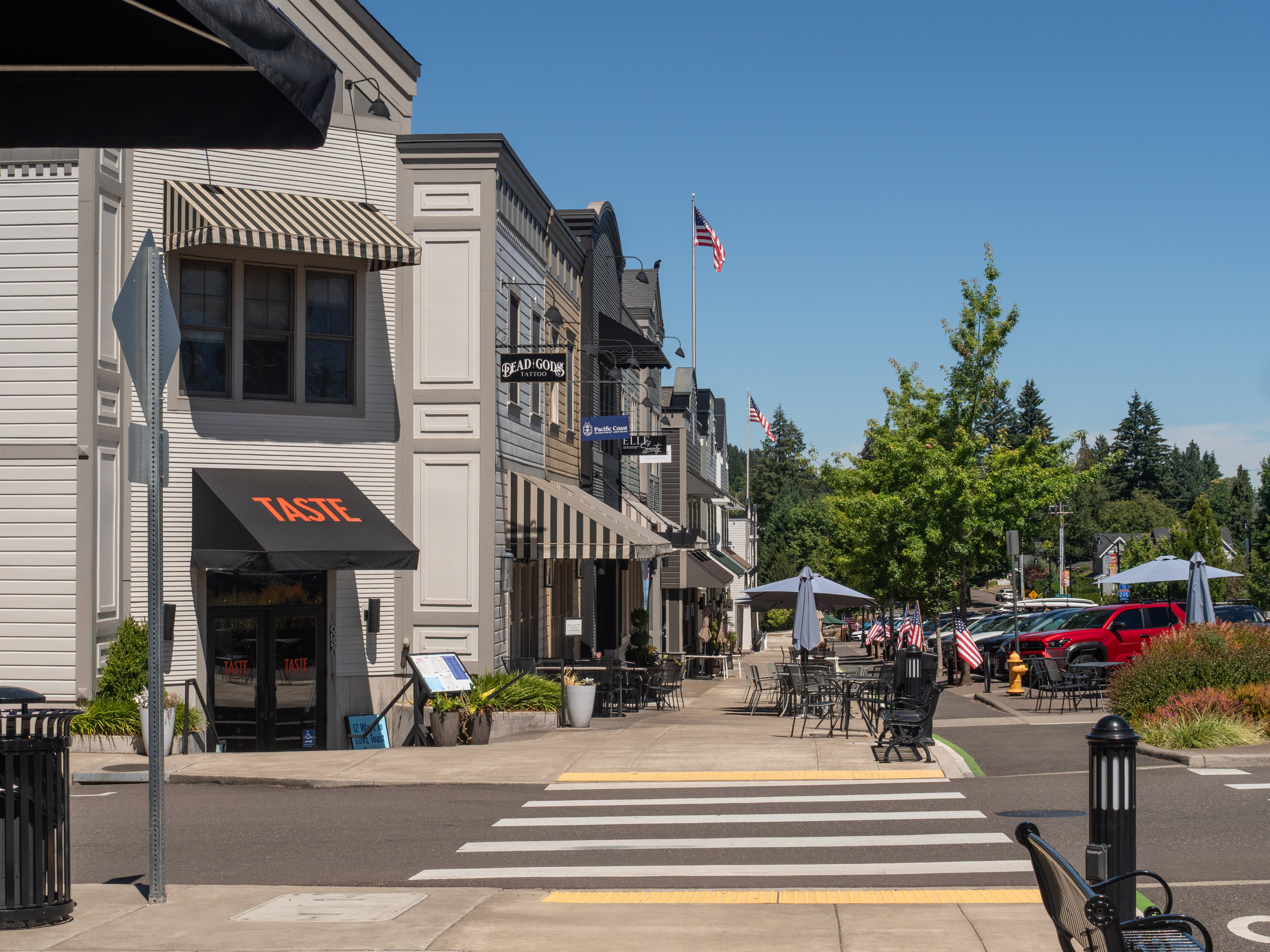
A main street in the historic Willamette District of West Linn, OR

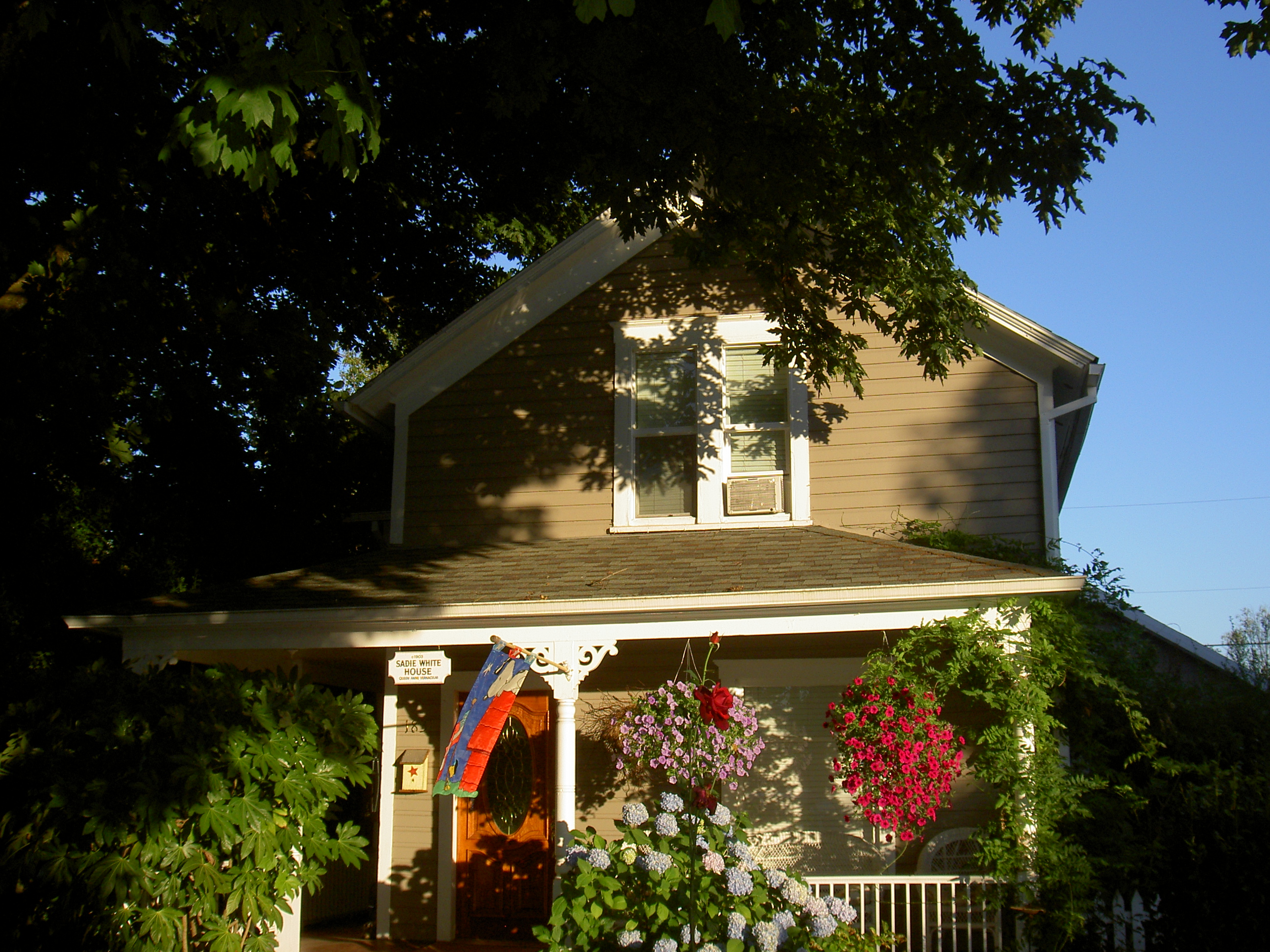
Historic Gothic Revival house, Willamette District

Historical population
Census	Pop.	Note	%±
1920	1,628		—
1930	1,956		20.1%
1940	2,165		10.7%
1950	2,945		36.0%
1960	3,933		33.5%
1970	7,091		80.3%
1980	11,358		60.2%
1990	16,367		44.1%
2000	22,261		36.0%
2010	25,109		12.8%
2020	27,373		9.0%

The median income for a household in the city was $72,010, and the median income for a family was $83,252 (These figures had risen to $94,844 and $108,821 respectively as of a 2007 estimate). Males had a median income of $61,458 versus $38,733 for females. The per capita income for the city was $34,671, among the state's top five. About 2.9% of families and 3.9% of the population were below the poverty line, including 3.6% of those under age 18 and 4.2% of those age 65 or over.

=== 2020 census ===
As of the 2020 census, West Linn had a population of 27,373. The median age was 43.1 years. 24.5% of residents were under the age of 18 and 17.9% of residents were 65 years of age or older. For every 100 females there were 94.4 males, and for every 100 females age 18 and over there were 91.0 males age 18 and over.

100.0% of residents lived in urban areas.

There were 10,104 households, of which 36.9% had children under 18 living in them. Of all households, 62.5% were married-couple households, 11.7% were households with a male householder and no spouse or partner present, and 21.0% were households with a female householder and no spouse or partner present. About 18.9% of all households were made up of individuals and 8.6% had someone living alone who was 65 years of age or older.

There were 10,491 housing units, of which 3.7% were vacant. Among occupied housing units, 78.9% were owner-occupied and 21.1% were renter-occupied. The homeowner vacancy rate was 0.9% and the rental vacancy rate was 4.8%.

|+ Racial composition as of the 2020 census

Race	Number	Percent
White	22,656	82.8%
Black or African American	225	0.8%
American Indian and Alaska Native	91	0.3%
Asian	1,358	5.0%
Native Hawaiian and Other Pacific Islander	35	0.1%
Some other race	409	1.5%
Two or more races	2,599	9.5%
Hispanic or Latino (of any race)	1,573	5.7%

=== 2010 census ===
As of the 2010 census, there were 25,109 people, 9,523 households, and 7,081 families residing in the city. The population density was 3,397.7 inhabitants per square mile (1,311.9/km^{2}). There were 10,035 housing units at an average density of 1,357.9 units per square mile (524.3 units/km^{2}). The racial makeup of the city was 90.7% White, 0.7% African American, 0.3% Native American, 4.0% Asian, 0.1% Pacific Islander, 1.0% from other races, and 3.1% from two or more races. Hispanic or Latino of any race were 4.0% of the population.

There were 9,523 households, of which 37.8% had children under the age of 18 living with them, 61.8% were married couples living together, 9.0% had a female householder with no husband present, 3.6% had a male householder with no wife present, and 25.6% were non-families. 20.6% of all households were made up of individuals, and 6.3% had someone living alone who was 65 years of age or older. The average household size was 2.62 and the average family size was 3.04.

The median age in the city was 41.5 years. 26.3% of residents were under the age of 18; 5.9% were between the ages of 18 and 24; 23.3% were from 25 to 44; 33.4% were from 45 to 64; and 11.1% were 65 years of age or older. The gender makeup of the city was 48.7% male and 51.3% female.

== Education ==
Public schools in West Linn, including West Linn High School, are part of the West Linn-Wilsonville School District.

The city operates the West Linn Public Library as part of the Library Information Network of Clackamas County.

== Media ==
- West Linn Tidings

== Notable people ==
- Cooper Becklin, racing driver
- Steve Blake, former NBA player
- Gert Boyle, the chairwoman of Columbia Sportswear, resident beginning in 1987
- Cole Gillespie, baseball player
- Tony Glausi, jazz musician
- Michael Harper, former NBA player
- Jennifer and Sarah Hart, perpetrators of the Hart family murders
- Darlene Hooley, US Representative
- Sam Leavitt, football player
- Ronn McFarlane, lutenist and composer
- Nate McMillan, former NBA coach
- Cade McNown, football player
- Max McNown, singer-songwriter
- Robert Moore, founder of Linn City
- Payton Pritchard, NBA player
- Brandon Roy, NBA player
- Chael Sonnen, submission grappling promoter, mixed martial artist
- Mitch Williams, baseball player
- Monty Williams, former NBA player and coach

== See also ==
- Tualatin Valley Fire and Rescue
