= Blue Heron Paper Company =

Defunct paper mill in Oregon City, Oregon, U.S.

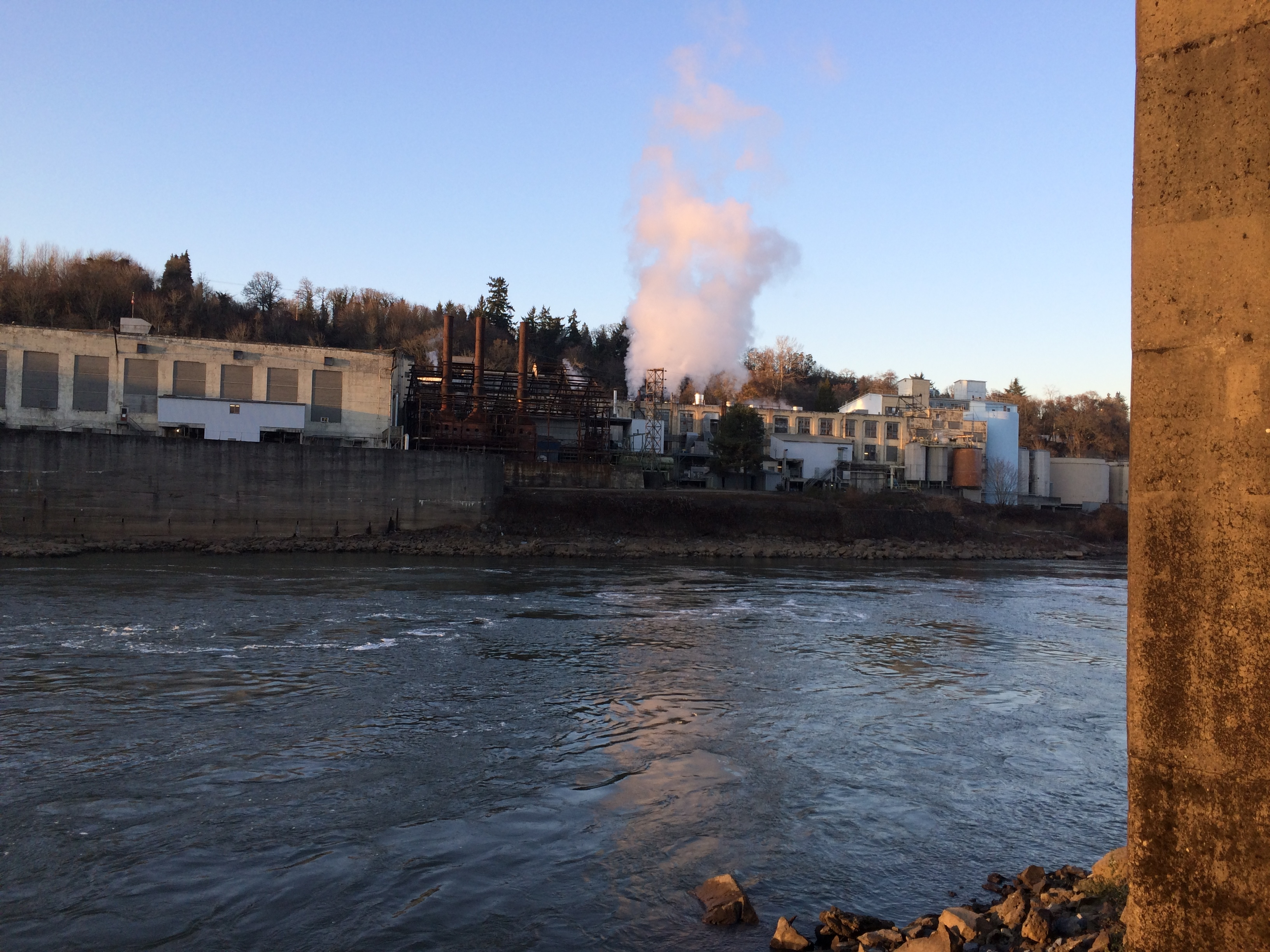
- The mill in 2013
- Operated: 2000–2011
- Location: Oregon City, Oregon U.S.
- Coordinates: 45.3548°N 122.6125°W
- Industry: Pulp and paper industry

The Blue Heron Paper Company was a paper mill at Willamette Falls in Oregon City, Oregon, on the southeast bank of the river across from the Willamette Falls Paper Company, the T.W. Sullivan hydroelectric plant, and the Willamette Falls Locks and canal.

In its operation from 2000 to 2011, the mill produced recycled paper products ranging from newsprint to paper bags. Facing increased competition from China, the company filed for chapter 11 bankruptcy in 2009. By 2011, the mill could no longer remain in operation due to the rising paper prices and lack of investors.

The confederated Tribes of Grande Ronde acquired control of the land in 2019 for $15.25 million, and are now planning a cultural and community center. Four other tribes cite ancestral connections to the area.

== History ==
In 1829, under the employment of the Hudson Bay Company, British fur trader John McLoughlin claimed two square miles of land around the Willamette Falls. Sawmills were erected to secure the land and began producing lumber for the Hudson's Bay Company. In 1832, McLoughlin directed his employees to blast a mill race along the falls and begin further construction of mills and housing. Industrial expansion continued throughout the 1800s, and in 1866, Pioneer Paper Manufacturing Company was established. This was the first paper mill in Oregon. Pioneer Paper Manufacturing Company closed in 1867, and from it came two new companies: Oregon City Mills and Crown Paper Company.

Oregon City Mills was a flour mill in operation until 1880, where it was purchased and then later absorbed into the Portland Flour Mills Co. Portland Flour Mills Co. was successful and stayed in operation until 1907, when it was purchased by W. P. Hawley and converted back into a paper mill, becoming The Hawley Paper Company. In 1948, The Hawley Paper Company was sold to Publishers Paper Co, who then became Smurfit Newsprint Corp in 1986. In 1998, Smurfit acquired Stone Container Corporation and became Smurfit-Stone. This acquisition was expensive and to help alleviate debts, the paper division of the company was sold to KPS Special Situations Fund LF of New York and mill employees in 2000.

Under the title of Blue Heron Paper Company, production continued. By 2006, the company was completely employee owned and operated. In the years following the shift to employee ownership, Blue Heron's financial situation worsened. Prices for the paper waste needed to produce paper increased by 70 percent. This increase was widely attributed to overseas competition. In 2009, the company filed for chapter 11 bankruptcy protection. In 2011, Blue Heron Paper Company permanently closed citing rising paper costs and lack of investors.

A major fire took place in January 2025. The fire was caused by a stove set up by transient squatters. Prior to this fire, an arson fire caused some damage in 2020. Ever since its closure, the structure was frequently accessed by transients.

== Indigenous history ==
The Clackamas and Clowewalla tribes resided above and below the Willamette Falls. These tribes were not hunter gatherers, nor practiced agriculture, but survived by fishing the falls. Large groups of men would use dip-nets or spears to catch fish, and these fish would then be preserved by drying or smoking. The fish were so plentiful that neighboring tribes would frequently come to trade and request fishing rights to the falls. In addition, the tribes were expert boatmen and were relied on heavily for river transportation. The villages of these tribes were made to be permanent. They build lodges out of cedar planks, and these lodges frequently housed upwards of 20 individuals.

Though there is no known number of individuals in the tribes, Lewis and Clark estimated that there were at least 1500 members of the Clackamas tribe before during their 1804 expedition. In 1829, the first oceangoing vessel to sail up the Willamette, the Owyhee, anchored in the Clackamas Rapids. The captain, John Dominis, had wanted to set up a fishery. Though the accounts of the interactions between Captain Dominis and the Clackamas people vary, they ended with the Clackamas people swimming out and cutting his anchor. In the small amount of time the Owyhee had docked, malaria had spread to the tribes along the Willamette. In the winter of 1829–1830, over nine tenths of the Clackamas and Clowewalla had died from the disease. By 1855, only 88 members of the Clackamas tribe remained, and only 13 members of the Clowewalla remained.

The complete devastation brought by malaria left the tribes of the Willamette Falls unable to stop their land from being stolen by English settlers. Infrastructure and housing created by the settlers began to overtake the falls, and in 1848 the last lodge that had been built by the Clowewalla was deliberately burned down. With nowhere left to go, the last 88 Clackamas people signed a treaty on January 10, 1855, which ceded all of their land to the US government in exchange for a ten-year annuity of $2,500. The treaty was ratified March 3, 1855, and the remaining Clackamas people were to relocate to the Grand Ronde Reservation.

== Environmental concerns ==
In 2000, the Blue Heron Paper Company was sued by The Northwest Environmental Defense Center, alleging that the wastewater produced by the paper mill was too warm and violated the Clean Water Act. This warm wastewater was argued to be too hot for the endangered salmon that reside within the Willamette River.

After the 2011 closure and subsequent abandonment of the property, multiple clean-up projects have been carried out. In 2013, concerns about copper and zinc leaking into the environment from the dilapidated pipes and roofs were raised, as there was a risk to the endangered salmon population. The runoff from the facility was run through a compost system to filter out excess amounts of such metals, and this process was continued for five years.

== Restoration ==
After the paper mill's closure in 2011, the joining of 4 local governments (the City of Oregon City, Metro, Clackamas County and the Governor's Regional Solutions Team) formed the Willamette Falls Legacy Project. This project was meant to survey the existing site and begin planning for redevelopment. In 2014 the group came to an agreement about the future of the project, and proposed to create a riverwalk in the place of the old mill. This proposal was expected to restore the surrounding environment, and create 1480 permanent jobs in the area.

In 2019, the Confederated Tribes of Grand Ronde purchased the site of the mill for $15.25 million. The Tribes of Grand Ronde brought forth their own proposal for the redevelopment of the site, and began communications with Willamette Falls Legacy Project. This budding partnership gained interest from the Willamette Falls Trust, which is a non-profit which represents four confederated tribes (Confederated Tribes of the Umatilla Indian Reservation, Confederated Tribes of Siletz Indians, Yakama Nation and Confederated Tribes of Warm Springs) who have history within the falls. By 2021, all three independent groups had formed an official partnership to redevelop the site of the mill.

In 2022, upset with the lack of any real progress on the redevelopment, the Confederated Tribes of Grand Ronde pulled out of the partnership. In May 2026, the Confederated Tribes of Grand Ronde broke ground on infrastructure for a mixed use development on the site, named tumwata village.
