= Thomas M. Reed =

American pioneer and government official (1825–1905)

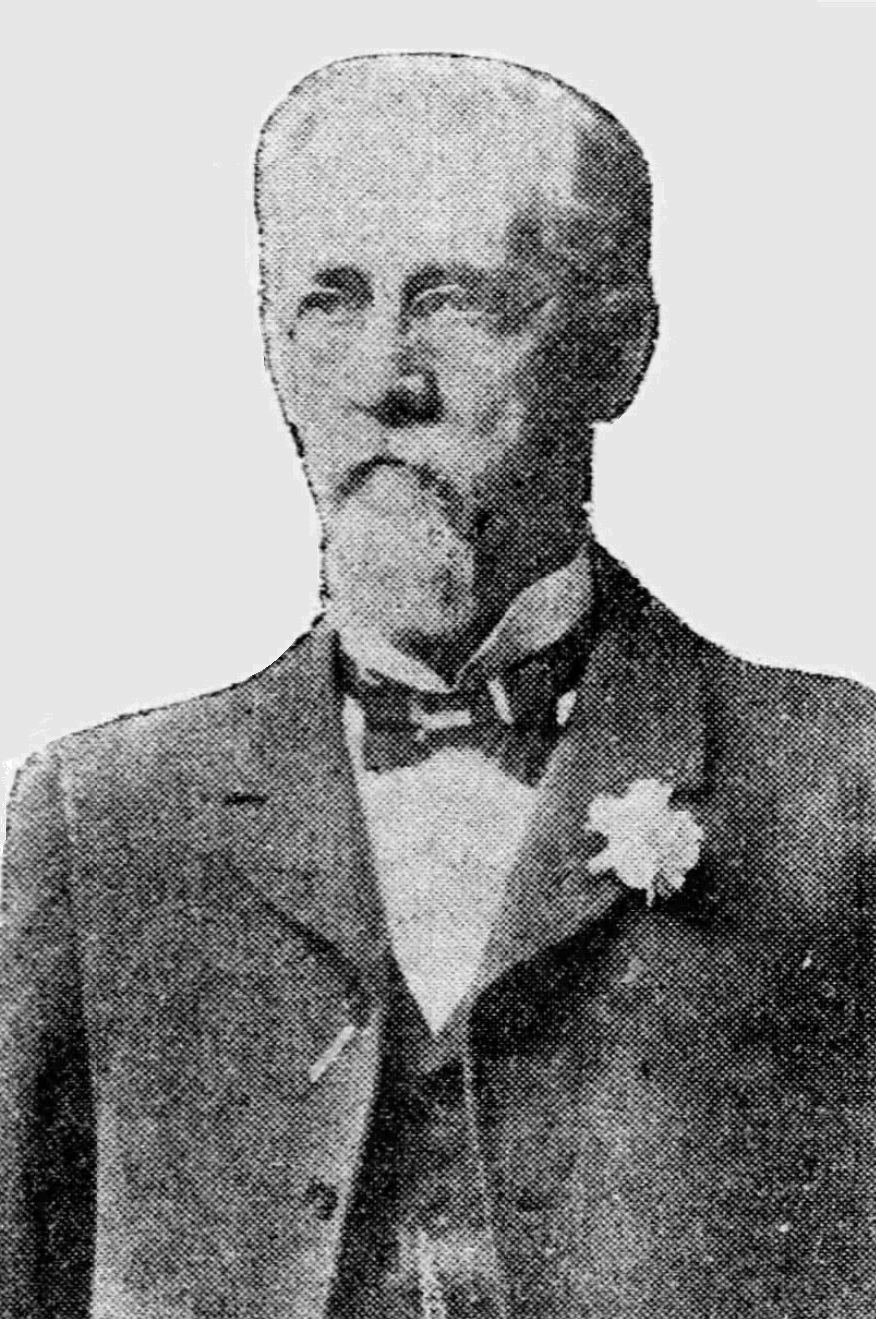
Washington pioneer Thomas M. Reed

Thomas Milburn(e) Reed (December 8, 1825 – October 8, 1905) was an American pioneer, merchant, surveyor, and public official who served as the first state auditor of Washington following statehood. He earlier held multiple territorial posts, including auditor of Washington Territory and president of the territorial council, and was long active in politics in the Inland Northwest during the Civil War era.

== Early life, education, and career ==
Born in Sharpsburg, Bath County, Kentucky, to Garnett B. and Nancy B. (Workman) Reed, both of English and Scotch-Irish ancestry who had settled in Kentucky around 1790, Reed was largely self-educated, he supported his own schooling through farm work and teaching. At age nineteen he taught school in Fleming County, then entered the mercantile business in Bath and Mason counties. He was initiated as a Mason in Kentucky in 1847.

In 1849, he joined the rush to California, traveling by way of Panama and arriving in San Francisco after seventy-eight days at sea aboard the Sylph. He engaged in mining and business in El Dorado County for eight years, serving as the county treasurer and as a supervisor. During this time, he studied law under Selucius Garfielde and entered into public affairs.

== Career in Washington Territory and Idaho ==
Reed settled in Olympia, Washington Territory, in 1857, where he operated a general store and served as an agent for Wells Fargo & Company. During the early 1860s, when Idaho was still part of Washington Territory, he was elected to the territorial legislature from Idaho County and served as Speaker of the House in 1862. He practiced law in Lewiston, Idaho, where he also served as prosecuting attorney and as a member of the Idaho Legislature representing Nez Perce County.

Returning to Olympia in 1865, Reed served as chief clerk in the United States Surveyor General's Office for seven years before entering private surveying. In 1877, he was elected to the Washington Territorial Council and chosen as its president. At the end of that session, he was appointed territorial auditor by the governor and continued in that office until 1888, when he was replaced during President Grover Cleveland's first administration.

== Statehood and later career ==
Reed was a delegate to Washington's 1889 constitutional convention and was elected the state's first auditor following admission to the Union that same year. He also served on the Olympia city council and remained active in civic affairs, including real estate development and mining investments in the region.

He was among the most prominent Freemasons in the Pacific Northwest, having received various Masonic rites and served as grand master of the Grand Lodge of Washington for three years and as its secretary for forty-four consecutive years until his death. He also held multiple high offices in the Grand Chapter, Grand Commandery, and Grand Council of the York Rite bodies.

== Personal life and death ==
Reed was married three times. His first marriage, in 1853, was to Elizabeth H. Finlay of Kentucky, with whom he had two sons: Thomas M. Reed Jr., later a federal judge in Nome, Alaska, and Mark E. Reed of Shelton, Washington, who also served in the state legislature. After her death in 1866, he married Eliza C. Giddings in 1867, who died in 1871 leaving a daughter, Emma. His third marriage, in 1873, was to Hattie Fox, with whom he had one son, Garnett Avery Reed.

Reed died at his home in Olympia at the age of 79, following a long illness. His funeral, conducted by the Grand Lodge of Washington, was held two days later in Olympia. His descendants, the Reed family, became some of the wealthiest businessmen in the Northwest United States.
