= High Steel Bridge =

Truss arch bridge in Mason County, Washington

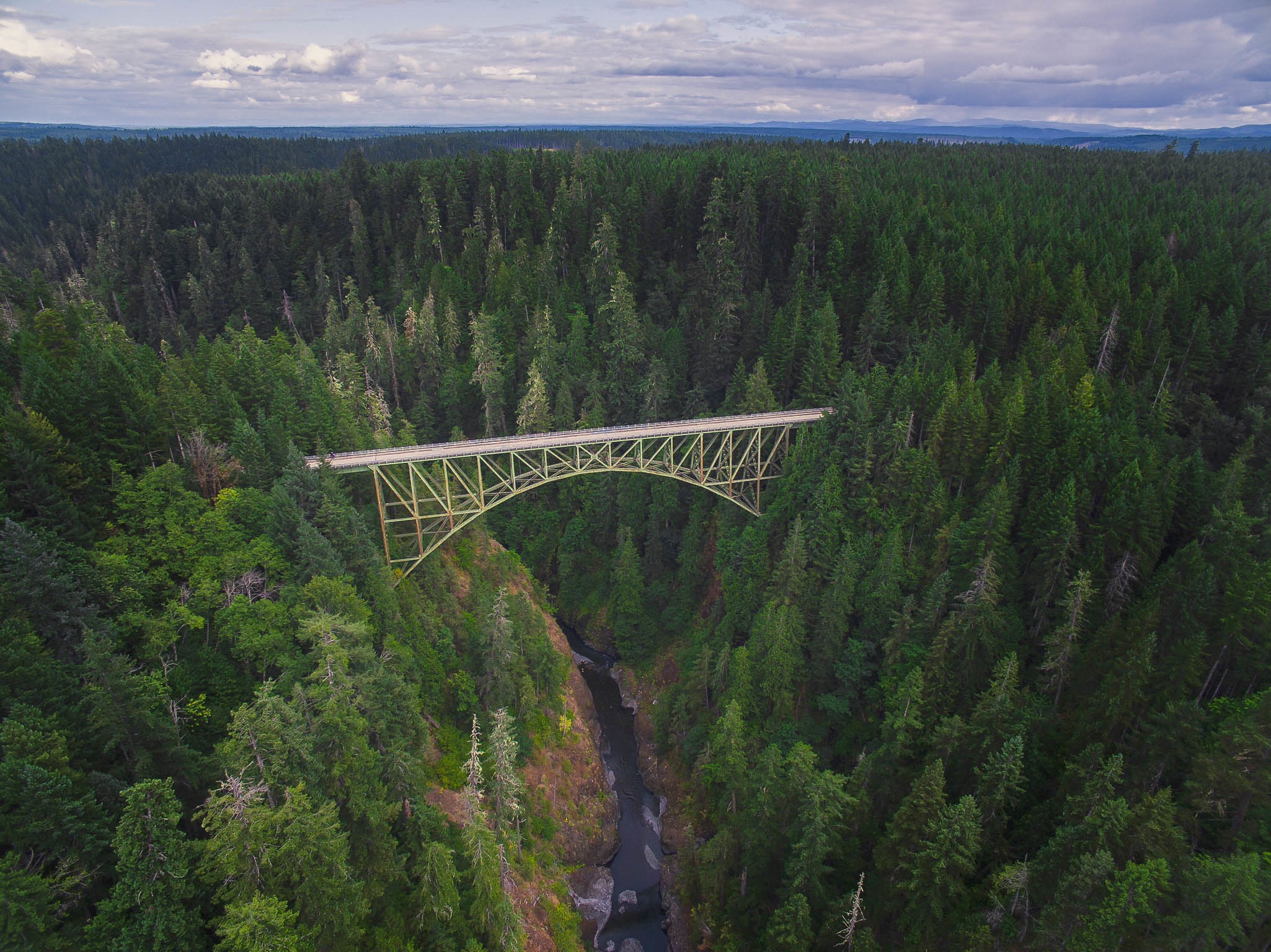
- High Steel Bridge
- Coordinates: 47°22′05″N 123°16′48″W
- Carries: Passenger vehicles and logging trucks, formerly trains
- Crosses: South fork, Skokomish River
- Locale: Mason County, Washington, U.S.
- Official name: Forest Service Road 2340
- Maintained by: United States Forest Service

Characteristics
- Design: Truss arch
- Material: Steel
- Total length: 685 ft (209 m)
- Height: 375 ft (114 m)

History
- Designer: American Bridge Co.
- Opened: 1929
- High Steel Bridge
- U.S. National Register of Historic Places
- Location within Washington (state)
- Location: Shelton, WA
- MPS: Historic Bridges/Tunnels in Washington State TR
- NRHP reference No.: 82004265
- Added to NRHP: July 16, 1982

Location
- Interactive map of High Steel Bridge

The High Steel Bridge is a truss arch bridge that spans the south fork of the Skokomish River, on National Forest Service road #2340 in Mason County, Washington, near the city of Shelton. The bridge is 685 feet (209 m) long, and its deck is 375 feet (114 m) above the river.

== History ==
Built in 1929, the bridge originally carried a rail line whose construction made logging operations possible in new areas of the Olympic Peninsula.

Along with the Vance Creek Bridge, it was one of two similar bridges built for the rail line by the Simpson Logging Company, which contracted its construction to the American Bridge Company.

At the time of the bridges' construction, new rail lines for logging were becoming increasingly cost-prohibitive, and most companies began using trucks in their place.

The expense of rail led to the bridges' unusual steel construction; while most logging bridges were temporary wooden structures, the Simpson Logging Company felt that only a permanent bridge would justify their investment.

The bridge was converted to a roadway in 1964, though it continues to be used for logging. On July 16, 1982, the bridge was added to the National Register of Historic Places.

== See also ==
- List of bridges in the United States by height
