= T. W. Sullivan Hydroelectric Plant =

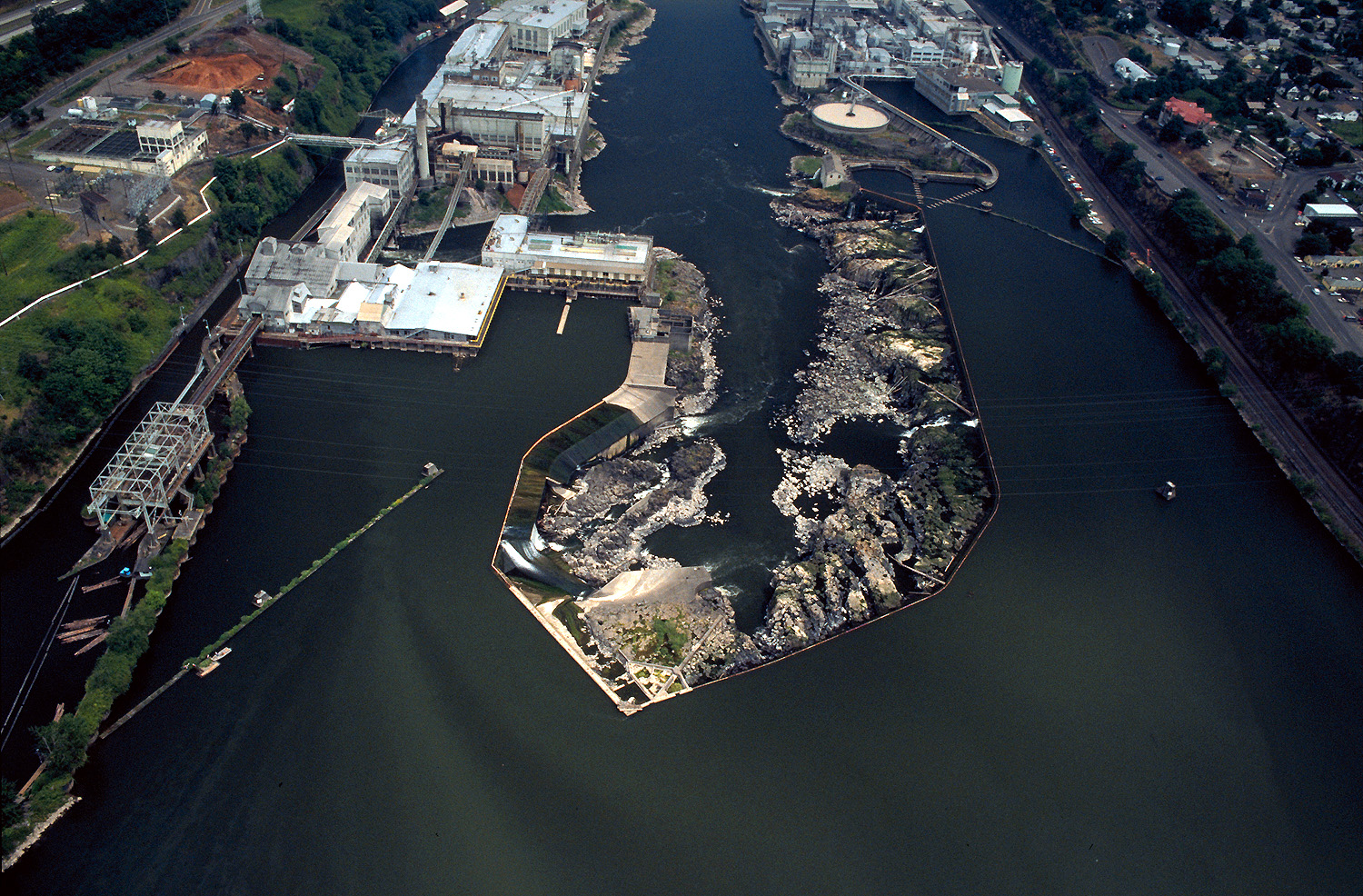
- Aerial View
- Interactive map of T. W. Sullivan Hydroelectric Plant
- Status: Active
- Construction began: 1888
- Opening date: June 3, 1889
- Built by: Willamette Falls Electric Power (PGE)
- Designed by: Willamette Falls Electric Power (PGE)
- Owner: Portland General Electric
- Operator: Portland General Electric

Dam and spillways
- Spillways: 2

Station B (T. W. Sullivan)
- Coordinates: 45.3514202°N 122.6196738°W
- Pump-generators: Westinghouse, General Electric.
- Website www.portlandgeneral.com

Portland General Electric's (PGE) T. W. Sullivan Hydroelectric Plant is a hydroelectric dam on the Willamette Falls built between 1888 and 1895. It is the source of the nation's first long-distance power transmission. The plant first opened with Station A in 1889. In 1895 a second powerhouse was built on the same dam, Station B, and Station A was removed. Station B. In 1953 Station B was renamed after the engineer, Thomas Sullivan, who designed it and the nearby paper mills. The Willamette Falls Paper Company was on the northwest bank, whereas the Blue Heron paper mill was across the river in Oregon City. By that year, the plant was generating between 11,000 and 17,500 kilowatts, which it still does today. PGE's Sullivan Plant at Willamette Falls is one of only a few dozen hydro-plants in the country officially designated as "Green." In the 1920s a portion of the paper mill was put on top of the dam, which was demolished in 2024.

== History ==
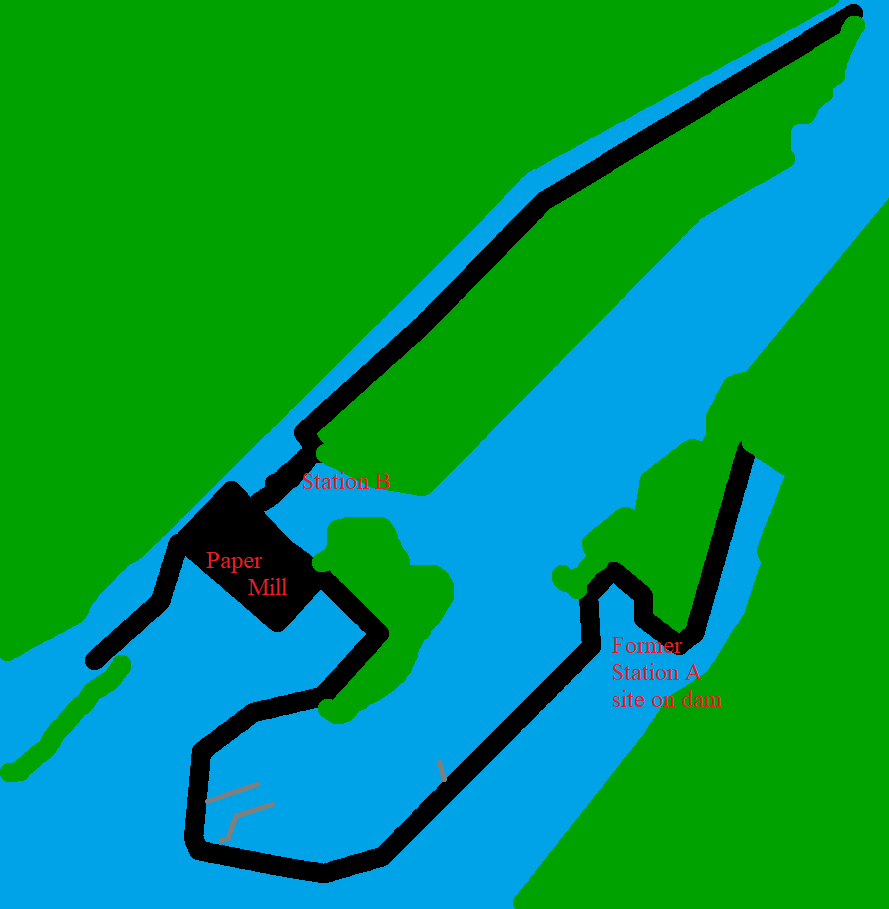
Map of Willamette Falls

The oldest part of the dam is the 1873 Willamette Falls Locks. The rest was built later for Station A.

The first batch of generators installed in Station B were massive Westinghouse alternators. They were the largest alternators built at the time and Westinghouse claimed they probably would not last 10 years. In 1911 several more Westinghouse alternators were added as well as a huge Allis-Chalmers generator 3 times the size of the first. A 1924 flood damaged half the turbines and the amount of generators had to be cut in half, including removal of the largest one. In 1947, a large part of the dam collapsed and had to be replaced. In 1953, another flood damaged the remaining original alternators. Currently there are 11 units from 1953 and two from 1924 operating inside.
