= Reed family =

American business family

Reed
- Current region: California; Washington; Oregon

The Reed family is an American business family that focuses on owning land. The family currently controls Simpson Investment Company, established 1890, and its spin-off Green Diamond Resource. The family owns 1.37 million acres across California, Washington and Oregon, and is as of 2017 the fifth-largest private landowner in the United States.

== History ==
The Reed family was established by patriarch Thomas M. Reed (1825–1905), a Washington pioneer and government official, and its success was greatly expanded by son Mark Edward Reed (1866–1933).

In 1897, Reed, a failed logger was hired by Sol Simpson to manage the Simpson Logging Company, Simpson's family-owned store, in the town of Shelton, Washington. Reed married Simpson's daughter, Irene, in 1901. After Simpson died in 1906, Reed assumed control of Simpson Logging. At that time the company employed approximately 300 people working out of five separate camps. By 1914, Reed had full control and transformed the company into a forest-products corporation. In 1925, the company opened its first sawmill, the Reed Mill, and entered the hemlock lumber manufacturing business.

In 2014, the Reed family purchased 600,000 acres of Oregon timberland, putting them fifth on the largest US landowners list. In 2015, the family was estimated to have a net worth of $1.7 billion.

As of 2017, the Reed family remained the fifth-largest private landowner in the United States, owning 1.37 million acres across California, Washington and Oregon.
