= Linn City, Oregon =

Human settlement in oregon, US

Coordinates: 45.36583°N 122.61111°W

Linn City was a community in Clackamas County, Oregon, United States, that existed from 1843 to 1861 and was destroyed in the Great Flood of 1862. The former site of Linn City was incorporated into the city of West Linn.

== History ==
Robert Moore founded Robin's Nest in 1843, near the banks of the Willamette River. Originally, the town was platted on about 50 acres (200,000 m^{2}) of land. By 1845 the town had two log houses and a number of tents. Robin's Nest was renamed Linn City on December 22, 1845, in honor of Lewis F. Linn, a United States Senator from Missouri. Later, by 1846, the town's citizens had constructed fifteen homes. In addition, Linn City was home to a tavern, a chair manufacturer, a cabinet shop, a gunsmith shop, and a wagon shop.

=== The town grows ===
Over the next few years Linn City grew. In 1849 the town held a hotel and two general stores among its businesses. The same year, James Moore, Robert's son, built a lumber mill and a gristmill. The mills were operated by at least 20 residents of Linn City. The mill complexes sprawled over the landscape. Many of the mill buildings were connected by docks nearly one mile in length. The town's post office opened in 1850, the same year that Robert Moore founded the local newspaper, the Spectator.

During the California Gold Rush, the men of Linn City began to leave in search of gold. A couple of years passed and the same men who left Linn City returned, many of them with their fortunes. Some of the miners were so rich they refused to work and began to spend the money that their gold hauls brought in. Money changed hands quickly as many gambling tables became available all over town. It was during these years that Linn City was at its height.

By the 1860 United States census, Linn City had a population of 225.

=== The flood ===
The demise of Linn City came as a surprise over several months in 1861. During October a heavy and constant rain began to fall. Though heavy rains during October in Oregon are not out of the ordinary, the rain that continued into November was. By the end of November, the Willamette River overflowed its banks. By December, the water had risen over some of the town's streets. Citizens watched, helpless, from their windows as the water rose at a rate of nearly one foot per hour. The resulting great flood destroyed Linn City. The walls of the houses and stores began to shudder and cave in. Other buildings were picked up and swept away by the powerful deluge. When the flood ended on December 14, only three homes remained standing in Linn City.

No one died in the Linn City flood, but the destruction was simply too great for the town to recover. The citizens gathered what few possessions were not swept away by the floodwaters and moved out of town. Linn City was abandoned as a ghost town. Today the city of West Linn stands about where Linn City once was.

== Public domain sources ==
This document includes text from the following public domain sources.

- https://web.archive.org/web/20061017233408/http://www.blm.gov/heritage/HE_Kids/HM3/Linn_City.htm
- http://www.blm.gov/wo/st/en/res/Education_in_BLM/Learning_Landscapes/For_Kids/History_Mystery/hm3/linn_city.html
- https://web.archive.org/web/20160930010910/http://www.blm.gov/wo/st/en/res/Education_in_BLM/Learning_Landscapes/For_Kids/History_Mystery/hm3/linn_city
