= Willamette Falls Paper Company =

Paper mill in West Linn, Oregon, U.S.

- Location: 4800 Mill Street; West Linn, Oregon, U.S.
- Coordinates: 45.3563°N 122.6155°W
- Industry: Pulp and paper industry
- Owner: Brian Konen (president)
- Website: www.wfpaperco.com

The Willamette Falls Paper Company (formerly the West Linn Paper Company) is an American paper manufacturing company with a paper mill located just above the Willamette Falls on the northwest bank of the Willamette River, in the city of West Linn, Oregon. It sits across the river from the site of the defunct Blue Heron Paper Company in Oregon City.

== History ==
The Willamette Falls have been home to several paper mills, beginning with a mill in Oregon City in 1866. The Willamette Falls Pulp and Paper Company opened on the West Linn side in 1889. It employed up to 1,600 people at the peak of its operations, and historians credit the mill with fueling regional publishing and supplying paper for publications across the U.S. The ownership of the West Linn mill changed several times; it was owned by Crown Zellerbach until late 1985, James River until 1990, and Simpson until 1996, when its closure idled nearly 400 employees. The mill reopened in 1997 as the West Linn Paper Company.

After two decades, the West Linn Paper Company announced it was shutting down in October 2017 due to an unexpected shortage of pulp supply. The mill reopened in November 2019 as Willamette Falls Paper Company with 97 of its previous employees, after a "multimillion dollar bet" from investor Ken Peterson's Columbia Ventures, who intends to demonstrate the viability of making paper using wheat farmers' waste straw instead of wood pulp.

In 2024, the mill suddenly laid off 70% of their 223 employees. A federal lawsuit was filed in October 2024 against the company that a layoff with a 3-day notice violated the WARN Act.
