= Alec Reid (disambiguation) =

Alec Reid (1931–2013) was an Irish priest.

Alec Reid may also refer to:

- Alec Reid (rugby union) (1878–1952), South African rugby union player
- Alec Cunningham-Reid (1895–1977), British World War I flying ace and MP
- Alec Reid (footballer) (1897–1969), Scottish footballer

== See also ==
- Alec Reed (born 1934), British businessman
- Alex Reid (disambiguation)
- Alex Reed (disambiguation)
