= Arts & Business =

- Successor: Business in the Community
- Formation: 1976
- Defunct: 2011
- Type: Non-governmental organization (NGO)
- Legal status: Defunct
- Purpose: Arts education and support
- Region served: United Kingdom
- Website: Arts & Business

Arts & Business was a British charitable organisation whose role was to develop partnerships between the cultural and private sectors in the United Kingdom.

Their aim was to increase investment for the arts from businesses and individuals, while encouraging the exchange of business and creative skills in both sectors. In 2016, Arts & Business merged with the Business in the Community charity and the organisation was dissolved.

== History ==
=== Foundation ===
Founded in 1976 as Association for Business Sponsorship of the Arts (ABSA), Arts & Business was based on a model developed in New York by David Rockefeller. The first organisation of its kind in the UK, ABSA pioneered business sponsorship of the arts in the UK.

=== Philanthropy ===
The Prince of Wales Medal for Arts Philanthropy was created in 2008 to honour leading philanthropists who have made an outstanding contribution to cultural organisations in the UK. Five individuals or couples are honoured each year for the impact of their financial donations, leadership and support has had on a regional or national level. The honourees are presented their medal by The Prince of Wales at a ceremony at his private residence in November. Previous honourees include Lord and Lady Sainsbury and Dame Vivien Louise Clore Duffield, DBE.

The Big Arts Give was a challenge fund scheme to help arts organisations develop income from individual giving. This scheme, devised with The Reed Foundation and The Big Give aimed to raise £3 million donated to the arts by Christmas 2010.

Cultural Champions was a programme designed to promote personal philanthropy in the cultural sector. It acknowledges individuals who have made a voluntary contribution to the arts in England.

=== The Arts & Business Awards ===
The annual Arts & Business Awards showcase partnerships and sponsorships between businesses and arts organisations in the UK. Categories include cultural branding, people development, community and young people, sustained partnerships, and business innovation as well as awards for individuals who sat on arts boards or acted as arts fundraisers.

=== Merger ===
In December 2011, Arts & Business merged with the Business in the Community (BITC) with the aim of returning to its business roots, working with corporate members to promote their support of cultural projects across the UK.

== Research ==
The Private Investment in Culture Survey or PICS was the largest single project they undertook and had been conducted in one form or another for 30 years. It was the world’s most comprehensive survey of investment trends from businesses, individuals and Trusts & Foundations to the arts. The findings tended to generate news coverage from the national press such as in 2010 from The Telegraph to trade press such as Arts Industry.

Some of their other work included research produced by James Gilmore and Joseph Pine on branding and the arts. This research was published under the title Beyond Experience.
