= Nicola Reed =

British beekeeper and philanthropist

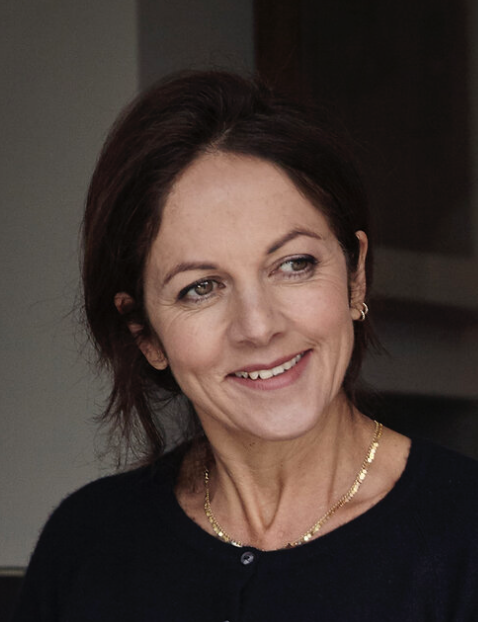
- Education: Chelsea College of Art; University College London; Central Saint Martins
- Occupations: Beekeeper; Philanthropist; Media commentator
- Spouse: James Reed

Nicola Reed is a beekeeper, artist, teacher, entrepreneur and philanthropist based in Wiltshire.

== Education ==
Reed holds a Master's degree in Fine Art from St Martin's School of Art, a PGDip from Chelsea College of Arts and a teaching degree from University College London.

== Beekeeping and advocacy ==
Reed took up beekeeping as a hobby in 2013, after taking over a hive that had been gifted to her husband for his birthday. As of 2022, she maintains over 320,000 bees across her hives.

Reed is a media commentator on beekeeping and the decline of the UK bee population. In a 2018 article for The Times newspaper, she attributed the decline in bee numbers to a loss of wildflowers resulting from urban sprawl and the use of bee-killing neonicotinoid pesticides. She also expressed support for legal action against the UK Government to suspend its use of thiamethoxam, a pesticide used on sugar beet crops that is thought to kill bees. Reed has also attributed the decline in bee numbers to the varroa mite, following its spread to the UK in 2003. She recommends organic produce over mass agricultural produce that relies heavily on bee-killing pesticides, and encourages households to increase the bee population by planting bee-friendly wildflowers, letting lawns grow, providing bee hotels, and hanging baskets.

She adopts the beekeeping technique advocated by Bill Anderson of The Idler, which involves collecting only small quantities of honey during periods of surplus.

According to a report by the Financial Times in June 2022, Reed plans to establish a beekeeping school in the grounds of her home in Malmesbury, Wiltshire.

She is ambassador for the bee-keeping charity Bees for Development, which helps some of the world's poorest communities alleviate poverty through beekeeping.

Reed is founder and creative director of Beeble, a honey spirits business.

== Philanthropy ==
Reed is a trustee of Big Give, an online resource that enables charity donors to find and support charity projects in their field of interest. The organisation is one of the UK's largest philanthropic endeavours, with a target of raising £1bn by 2030. The Reed family are among its principal donors. The Big Give has raised over £452m for thousands of charity projects, including over £3.67m for the Disasters Emergency Committee's Ukraine Humanitarian Appeal, £5.5 million for COVID-19 relief efforts, £4.3m for environmental causes via the Green Match Fund and over £2m for the Grenfell Tower fire appeal.

Reed is a former trustee of Ethiopiaid, a Reed family charity working to relieve poverty and sickness in Ethiopia.

== Reed Short Film Awards ==
Reed founded the Reed Short Film Awards, an annual film competition to recognize and celebrate the art of short films. The competition was open to emerging filmmakers from around the world, with entries in various genres including drama, comedy, documentary, and animation. The competition ran from 2010 to 2016.

== Artistry ==
Reed is a book illustrator, photographer and painter.

Her animated projection work, The Busy Bee Has No Time for Sorrow, was shown at the Mdina Biennale, Malta in 2020. Her work as a book illustrator includes Fox by Anthony Gardener

Reed has tutored fine art on the UAL Camberwell Chelsea Wimbledon Foundation and at the University of Gloucestershire. She has led drawing workshops at the University of Malta, Chelsea College of Arts, The Idler Magazine and The Connection in Piccadilly.

== Personal life ==
Reed grew up in Edinburgh. She now lives in Wiltshire and Notting Hill with her husband James. The couple have six children.
