= Little Compton, Warwickshire =

Village in Warwickshire, England

Coordinates: 51.969437°N 1.622288°W

Little Compton
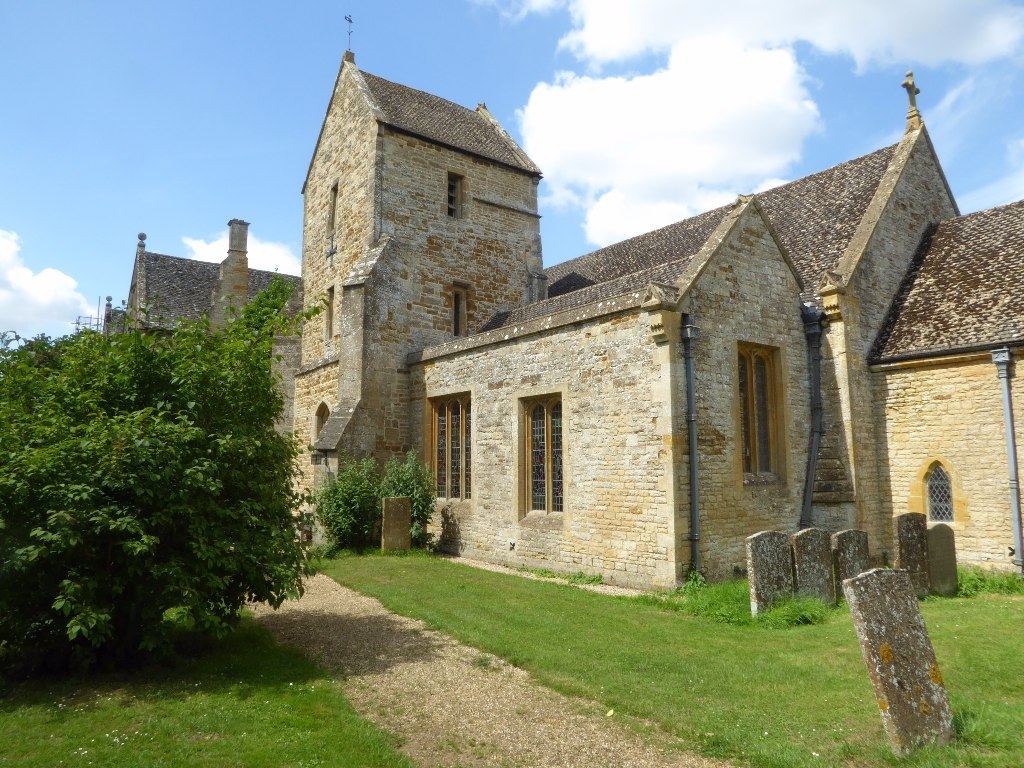
- St Denys Church in Little Compton

- Location within Warwickshire
- Population: 332 (parish) (2011 Census)
- OS grid reference: SP2630
- Civil parish: Little Compton
- District: Stratford-on-Avon
- Shire county: Warwickshire
- Region: West Midlands
- Country: England
- Sovereign state: United Kingdom
- Post town: Moreton-in-Marsh
- Postcode district: GL56
- Dialling code: 01608
- Police: Warwickshire
- Fire: Warwickshire
- Ambulance: West Midlands
- UK Parliament: Stratford-on-Avon
- Website: littlecompton.info

Little Compton is a village and civil parish in the Stratford-on-Avon district, in south Warwickshire, England, and is located about three miles east of Moreton-in-Marsh. In 2011 the parish had a population of 332 . Historically it was an exclave of Gloucestershire. The centre of the village is home to the Reed Business School, under the company of the same name (Reed), and is owned by Sir Alec Reed.

== In popular culture ==
Brewery Row and the Reed Business School, within Little Compton, were filming locations for Doctor Who's 100th serial, The Stones of Blood.

== Public transport ==
Little Compton's nearest train station is Moreton-in-Marsh (3 miles away), in the town of the same name. The village is served by few and infrequent bus services.
