= James Reed (businessman) =

British businessman (born 1963)

James Reed CBE, CCMI, FCIPD
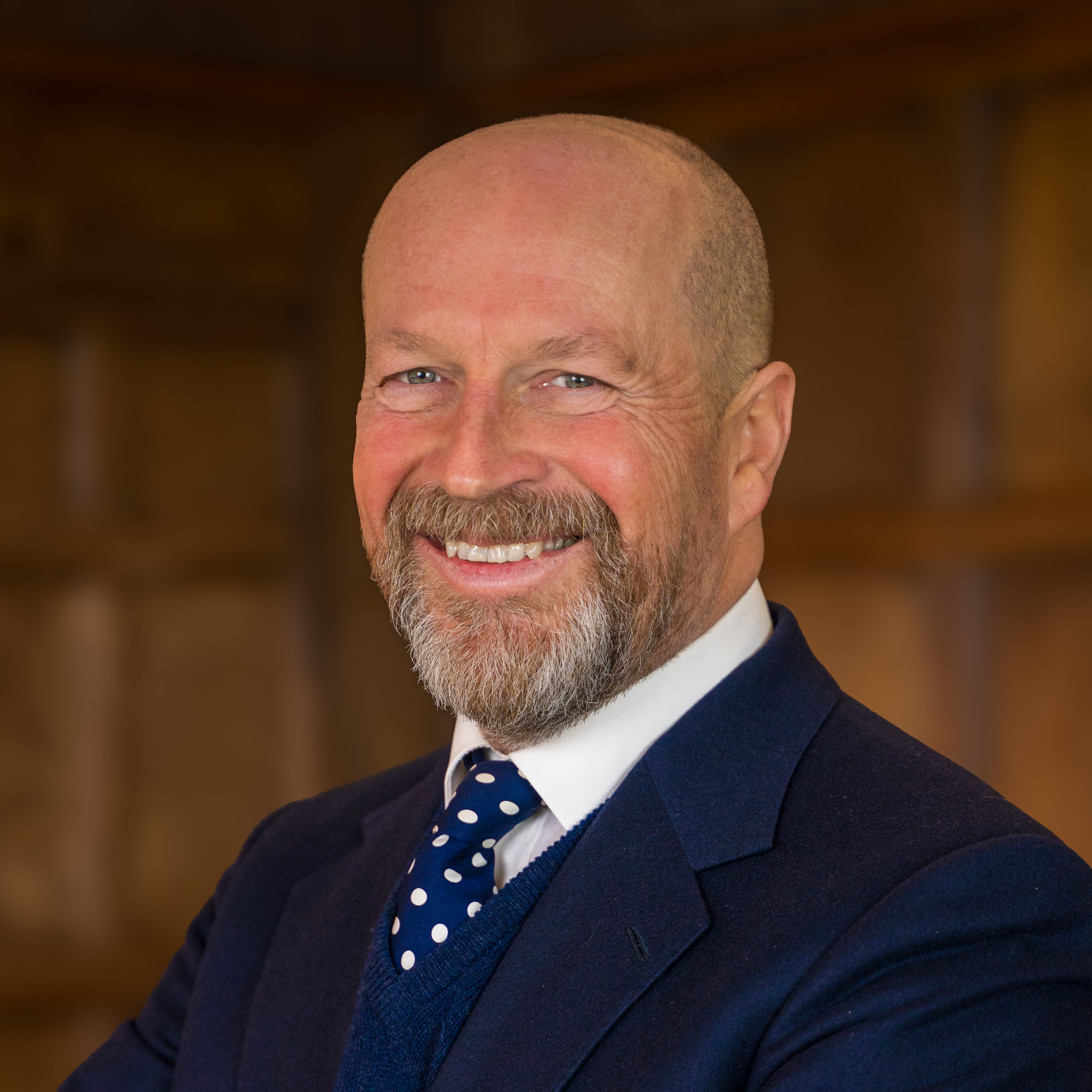
- Reed in 2025
- Born: James Andrew Reed; 12 April 1963 (age 63); Woking, Surrey, England
- Education: Christ Church, Oxford; Harvard Business School
- Occupations: Chairman and Chief Executive Officer (CEO), Reed Group; Chairman, The Big Give
- Known for: Entrepreneurship and philanthropy
- Spouse: Nicola Reed
- Children: 6
- Parent(s): Alec Reed, Adrianne Eyre
- Website: Official website

James Andrew Reed (born 12 April 1963) is a British businessman. He is chairman and chief executive officer (CEO) of the Reed group of companies. He is the son of Sir Alec Reed, who founded the company in 1960. He is chairman of The Big Give Trust, a match-funding charity supported in part by the Reed Foundation and the Reed family. As of 2026, The Big Give reported total donations exceeding £452 million; it has an internal target of £1 billion in donations by 2030. According to Charity Times, the 2025 Christmas Challenge raised more than Comic Relief and Children in Need, making it the largest UK fundraising event of that year.

== Early life and education ==
Reed was born on 12 April 1963 in Woking, Surrey, one of three children of Alec and Adrianne Reed.

Reed attended Scaitcliffe prep school and later St Paul's School, London. He graduated from Christ Church, Oxford in 1984 with a degree in Philosophy, Politics and Economics (PPE). Subsequently, he gained an MBA from Harvard Business School. During his time at Oxford, Reed was the political editor of Samizdat, a magazine for political science students. At Harvard, he produced In The Shadow of The City, a case study and video focusing on slum improvement works in Addis Ababa, Ethiopia.

== Early career ==
Reed's first job was levelling graves at a graveyard in Old Windsor, which he described as "...miserable, it was cold, it was horrible and hard - and I didn't last very long at it."

He graduated from Oxford in 1984, seeking to work for an entrepreneur. He sent a speculative job application to Gordon and Anita Roddick of The Body Shop, working in the firm's stores in Brighton and Great Marlborough Street, London. The Roddicks then hired him as Gordon's assistant. Reed then worked for Saatchi & Saatchi between 1985 and 1986, where he managed advertising campaigns for British Rail, Club 18-30, Eurotunnel and Procter & Gamble.

From 1987 to 1988 he coordinated relief and development programmes in Bangladesh, Pakistan and Soviet-occupied Afghanistan, on behalf of Help the Aged and Afghanaid. He coordinated fundraising, publicity, and sponsorship for Afghanaid and covered the Afghan conflict for The Independent newspaper. He entered Afghanistan disguised as an Afghan travelling with Mujahideen rebels.

Reed joined the BBC in 1990, after graduating from Harvard. He produced documentaries for BBC TV on topics such as Tom Peters and prison privatisation. After the Tom Peters documentary grossed £1m, Reed requested funding for a similar programme but was denied, prompting him to leave the BBC.

He became a non-executive director of Reed in 1992. In a 2014 radio interview, he spoke of the background to joining the family business full-time:

"Joining the family business wasn't a fait accompli. When my father got to 60 he said, 'James, there's not much point having a family business if there isn't any family in it'. I'd been sitting on the fence for some time. Then one day he said, 'That job that I have been talking to you about? It's going to be in The Sunday Times Appointments section next week – do you want to apply or not?'."

Reed frequently acknowledges that his appointment to the family business was based partly on nepotism, telling The Guardian in 2010 that "...there is no other way to describe it." Reed's father is quoted as believing that family-run businesses "...cut out a lot of company politics".

== Reed Group ==
Reed became operations director at Reed Group in April 1994 and chief executive officer in 1997; Reed's father gave him a baton to symbolise the handover of power. The baton now hangs on the wall of Reed's personal office. He succeeded his father to the position of chairman in 2004.

Reed has said that his three most significant contributions to the Reed Group are the development of reed.co.uk, the introduction of Reed in Partnership and the globalisation of the company. The company's revenue has increased from £150 million to £1.3 billion under his leadership.

=== Reed in Partnership ===
In 1997, Reed was invited to bid on contracts issued by the Blair administration, in which some of the traditional work of Job Centres was outsourced to the private sector. This resulted in Reed in Partnership, which now employs 2,500 people. Reed was formerly an associate of the Prime Minister's Delivery Unit and a member of the IPPR's Taskforce on Race Equality and Diversity in the Private Sector.

In July 2023, Reed Group launched Reed Environment, an initiative whose main focus is establishing Energy Academies across the UK by 2025. These Academies will provide essential skills training for assessors and installers of net-zero technologies, including solar power, electric vehicles and heat pumps. In addition, the Academies will offer job opportunities, energy advice and consultancy solutions related to retrofitting homes for energy efficiency.

=== De-listing ===
As chief executive officer, Reed delisted Reed Executive from the UK Stock Exchange in 2003, buying back the company for 140p per share and a valuation of £62.6m. Some financial commentators claimed the Reed family took advantage of a lull in the firm's share price following a cyclical slump and the controversy around the spin-off of Reed Health. Reed launched a hostile takeover of Reed Health two years later, bringing the company back under the family's control. According to Reed, the firm was delisted because it no longer required outside capital; Reed's father suggested in his autobiography that the de-listing was caused in part by the publication of the Higgs and Cadbury reports, which called for greater restrictions on public company governance.

=== Reed.co.uk ===
Reed.co.uk was the first recruitment website offered by a recruitment agency in the UK. It launched in 1995 with 40 vacancies. It now hosts over 3.3 million jobs per year. The company's first website was suggested and built by a young IT contractor nicknamed "Pancake the Clown", after the contractor's sideline business as a children's entertainer. Reed later said: "The truth of the matter is, I got Pancake the Clown to build our first prototype."

Reed has also spoken of being "horrified" when a young member of staff suggested that the website should offer vacancies advertised by rival recruitment firms. Reed would go on to approve the experiment; the scheme began in May 2000 and by November of the same year over 2000 rival firms had registered on the site. Reed would go on to credit the idea as being the foundation of the firm's online strategy. The junior employee earned a £100,000 bonus for his suggestion.

== Media commentary ==
In 2024 Reed launched a podcast, James Reed: All About Business, in which he interviews leading figures from the world of business, management and entrepreneurship.

Reed is a regular contributor to the Notebook column in City A.M. newspaper. Reed has commented in the media on a range of employment issues, including the green skills gap, wages, apprenticeships, automation, working past retirement, employee engagement, and prisoner/ex-prisoner employment. He has argued that state contracts should not go to corporations that deliberately delay payments to creditors, comparing such firms to "drunk drivers". He has encouraged school-leavers to consider work rather than further study upon leaving school. Reed supports remote work arrangements. He has described the employers' National Insurance increases announced by Chancellor Rachel Reeves in the 2024 budget as a tax on jobs, which in 2026 he went on to characterise as an "historic mistake". He has also argued that "day-one rights" in the Employment Rights Bill have further reduced hiring, particularly of marginal candidates.

In 2022, Reed publicly argued that the UK would avoid recession, contrary to Bank of England forecasts. In July 2023, he warned that recession risks were increasing.

In a 2025 interview with Times Radio, Reed stated that the United Kingdom was experiencing a graduate recession, attributing the trend to artificial intelligence disproportionately affecting entry-level employment opportunities. He advised families and school-leavers to reconsider traditional assumptions about white-collar career paths, such as law and accountancy, and to explore alternative routes into the workforce. In 2026, Reed expressed support for the introduction of V Levels, proposed post-16 vocational qualifications in England intended to sit alongside A Levels and T Levels.

Speaking to the BBC in 2026 about the rise of AI and automation, Reed advocated a "robot tax" rather than taxes on employment. He added: "Taxation follows wealth. When you see these companies being valued at over a trillion, that's where the action is. So that's where the taxation should follow."

== Television appearances ==
Reed often appears in television and online commercials for the Reed Group, in support of its ongoing Love Mondays campaign.

Between 2008 and 2018, he appeared in a series of commercials alongside the actor and comedian Rufus Jones. Jones plays Reed as a caricature of a superhero who transforms job seekers into their ideal role. In one advert Reed makes a cameo appearance as an ice-cream seller who is then transformed into a nightclub DJ. The adverts have received more than 73 million YouTube views. Some adverts have been directed by the previous year's winners of Reed's annual Short Film Competition.

Reed has appeared in series 11, 13, 15 and 20 of BBC TV's The Apprentice.

== Philanthropy ==
Reed is a trustee of several Reed family charitable initiatives, including the Reed Foundation and The Big Give Trust.

=== Reed Foundation ===
The Reed Foundation is a UK-based charitable organisation, originally established in 1972 by Alec Reed as the Reed Charity. It supports a wide range of philanthropic initiatives, with a focus on education, community development, and poverty alleviation. The Foundation is the principal funder of Reed's social impact projects, including The Big Give.

=== The Big Give ===
The Big Give is sponsored and supported by the Reed Foundation, which was gifted an 18% stake in the Reed Group by the Reed family. As a result, The Guardian noted that Reed employees "effectively work one day a week to fund good causes".

The Big Give Trust is chaired by Reed and has helped to raise over £452m for UK-registered charities. It was founded by Reed's father in 2007.

Reed aims to broaden the reach of The Big Give beyond the UK. During an interview with Spears in March 2023, he expressed his desire to recruit affluent families and charitable institutions from other countries, offering them a "starter kit" to create localised versions of The Big Give.

Following the 2022 Russian invasion of Ukraine, The Big Give raised over £3.67m for the Disasters Emergency Committee Ukraine Humanitarian Appeal. In 2024, The Big Give raised £2.1m for women & girls' charities.

In December 2025, the Big Give Christmas Challenge campaign raised a record £57.4m, involving 1,591 charities and over 152,000 donors. Match funders—including the Reed Foundation—contributed £25.8m. The total surpassed on-the-night figures for established UK telethons such as Comic Relief and Children in Need. It is now the UK's largest annual public fundraising campaign. It aims to raise £1bn in donations by 2030.

=== Other initiatives ===
During the COVID-19 pandemic, Reed re-launched the Keep Britain Working campaign following its initial launch in the wake of the 2008 financial crisis. Alongside Lord Sugar, Lord Bamford, Luke Johnson, James Timpson and others, Reed called upon CEOs to protect jobs by sacrificing management salaries and company profit. During the campaign Reed declined his salary from the family business. He also donated £100,000 from personal funds to the National Emergencies Trust (NET), which was matched by a £100,000 donation from the Reed Foundation via The Big Give, whose campaign for NET raised £1.36m in total.

In January 2022 Reed signed the Armed Forces Covenant on behalf of Reed Recruitment, in support of current and former service personnel in their transition away from the military.

In a 2023 interview with The Times, Reed called on the UK's wealthiest 1% to give more to charitable causes, stating: "There needs to be a call to arms for the wealthy…the first place to look is in the mirror, isn't it?"

==== Grenfell Tower appeal ====
Reed's family home in London is within sight of Grenfell Tower. After witnessing the Grenfell Tower fire, Reed set up a Big Give charity appeal that raised £1m within 48 hours of the disaster and £2.6m in total. Reed donated £100,000 of his own money and the Reed Foundation donated a further £100,000, alongside donations made by members of the public, businesses and local organisations. The proceeds were donated to The K&C Foundation. Reed called for some of the appeal proceeds to be spent on an educational centre for local residents to learn coding and other digital skills.

==== All About Business Entrepreneurs Fund ====
In 2026, Reed announced the All About Business Entrepreneurs Fund, a programme supporting young entrepreneurs through grants and mentoring.

== Publications ==
Reed has written several books on careers, recruitment and management, published by Portfolio Penguin.

=== Put Your Mindset to Work (2011) ===
Co-authored with Harvard lecturer Paul G. Stoltz, Put Your Mindset to Work argues that employers value mindset over technical skill. The book outlines three qualities it considers key to employability and leadership. It reached the USA Today best-seller list in June 2011 and won a CMI "Management Book of the Year" award. A second edition was published in 2013, with endorsements from James Timpson, Gordon Roddick and Jim Kouzes.

=== Why You: 101 Interview Questions You'll Never Fear Again (2015) ===
Based on feedback from recruiters and jobseekers, Why You? groups common interview questions into 15 themes and advises candidates to respond authentically rather than rely on scripted answers. It received favourable reviews from The Bookbag and the Notting Hill Post.

=== The 7-Second CV: How to Land the Interview (2019) ===
The 7-Second CV takes its title from the brief time recruiters spend scanning a CV. Reed offers guidance on concise presentation and the use of social-media profiles. The book was endorsed by entrepreneur Alan Sugar.

=== The Happy Recruiter (2019) ===
A short guide for recruitment professionals, The Happy Recruiter outlines traits associated with effective and ethical recruiters.

=== Life's Work: 12 Proven Ways to Fast-Track Your Career (2020) ===
Published in 2020, Life's Work discusses career planning, resilience and motivation. Reed argues that successful careers are built on ambition, positivity, self-knowledge and self-discipline. Successful executives tend to be sociable - but also "sustainably selfish", establishing personal boundaries to protect against burnout. Reed also emphasises the importance of working in high-growth sectors, where personal progress is propelled by structural change, a phenomenon Reed likens to Poohsticks.

=== Karma Capitalism: Why Being a Good Business Is Good Business (2025) ===
Reed's sixth book, Karma Capitalism: Why Being a Good Business Is Good Business (Ebury Edge, 2025), advocates for "PhilCos" - companies in which a charitable foundation holds a significant or controlling stake. He cites foundation-owned firms such as Lego, Novo and Rolex as examples of the model in practice.

Reed argues the PhilCo structure can help companies attract talent and perform more effectively over the long term. In a November 2025 op-ed, Reed claimed that one third of Danish PhilCos survive to 40 years, compared with around 10 per cent of traditional companies. In the same article, he criticised conventional ESG frameworks as "box-ticking exercises", noting that FTSE 100 charitable donations had fallen 13 per cent over the previous decade despite a 49 per cent rise in profits, with "less than 1 per cent" of FTSE 100 net profit now going to charity. In a 2026 interview with CNBC, Reed described himself as "...building a movement of PhilCos", having been approached by other family business owners.

== Professional memberships ==
Reed is a Chartered Companion of the Chartered Management Institute (CMI) and a Fellow of the Chartered Institute of Personnel and Development (CIPD). In October 2026 the CMI, of which he was already a trustee, announced that he would succeed Fiona Dawson CBE as its President at the end of her term that month.

== Personal life ==
Reed is married to the artist, beekeeper and whisky entrepreneur Nicola Arkell Reed. The couple live in London and Wiltshire and have six children. His hobbies include running, riding and driving horses, football and mountaineering. Reed rides a Vespa to work. He has participated in two of Reed's annual Alpine Leadership Challenges, led by the alpinist Stefan Gatt.

Reed has described his father as the person he most admired in the recruitment industry, and King Alfred the Great as his boyhood hero.

== Honours and awards ==
Reed was appointed Commander of the Order of the British Empire (CBE) in the 2023 New Year Honours for services to business and charity.

Reed has received several professional accolades throughout his career, including:

- 2019: Voted top recruitment CEO on Glassdoor's Employees' Choice Awards and ranked 20th CEO across all industries.
- 2021: Added to the Saffery Champness Hall of Fame by the TIARA Recruitment Awards for contributions to the recruitment industry.
- 2024: Staffing Industry Analysts Staffing 100 Europe Hall of Fame.
- 2024: Spears Impact Award for philanthropy and social change.
