= Alex Reid =

Alex or Alexander Reid may refer to:

== Arts and entertainment ==
- Alexander Reid (art dealer) (1854–1928), Scottish art dealer
- Alexander Reid (playwright) (1914–1982), Scottish playwright
- Alex Reid (screenwriter) (born 1965), American TV writer and producer
- Alex Reid (actress) (born 1980), English actress
- Alexandra Reid (born 1992), American singer
- Alex Reid, character in the television series Saving Hope

== Sports ==
- Alex Reid (footballer, born 1947) (1947–1998), Scottish footballer
- Alex Reid (fighter) (born 1975), English mixed martial artist
- Alex Reid (footballer, born 1995), English footballer

== Others ==
- Alexander Reid (doctor) (1586–1643), Charles I's physician
- Sir Alexander Reid, 2nd Baronet (died 1750), Scottish politician, Member of Parliament for Elgin Burghs, 1710–13
- Alexander Walker Reid (1853–1938), New Zealand farmer and inventor
- Sir Alexander Reid, 3rd Baronet (1932–2019), High Sheriff of Cambridgeshire, 1987–1988

== See also ==
- Alec Reid (disambiguation)
- Alex Reed (disambiguation)
- Sir Alec Reed (born 1934), British businessman
- Alexander Read (disambiguation)
