= Scaitcliffe =

Defunct school in Surrey, England

Coordinates: 51.4402°N 0.5852°W

Information
- Established: 1896
- Closed: 1996
- Gender: Boys
- Age: 6 to 13

Scaitcliffe was a prep school for boys aged 6–13 in Egham, Surrey. Founded in 1896, it was both a boarding and day school. After merging with Virginia Water Prep School in 1996, the school is now co-educational and known as Bishopsgate School. The school is located in a small village near Egham called Englefield Green.

== History ==
First school

The first Scaitcliffe school was founded by Charles Croslegh in 1881 and was named after his family home in Lancashire. It was run as a preparatory school for the Royal Indian Engineering College at Cooper's Hill, later Brunel University. Croslegh was responsible for building the Big Room and commissioned Henry Woodyer to design the chapel in 1886.

Second school

In 1896, Croslegh sold the lease to Philip Morton and Ronald Vickers, who established a preparatory school. In 1903, Vickers became the sole owner and oversaw the extension of many buildings and the construction of the sanatorium and squash courts. The number of pupils had reached 40 in the 1920s and 72 by 1979.

Following several decades under the control of the Vickers family, in 1990 the ownership of the school was placed in the hands of a charitable trust.

The school was used as a location for A very open prison, an episode of the BBC series Screen Two, broadcast in March 1995.

== Former pupils ==
- Bim Afolami, MP
- Marcus Armytage, journalist and former jockey
- Richard Branson, founder of Virgin Group
- Damian Elwes, artist
- Cary Elwes, actor
- James Fisher, naturalist
- Geordie Greig, newspaper editor
- Michael Holroyd, biographer, who describes it in his 1999 book Basil Street Blues.
- Peter Palumbo, Baron Palumbo, the former chairman of the Arts Council of Great Britain
- James Reed CBE (born April 1963), chairman and chief executive of the Reed group of companies
- Jonathan Riley-Smith, historian
- William Rous, army officer
- Colin Tennant, 3rd Baron Glenconner, socialite
- Pen Tennyson, film director
- Abhisit Vejjajiva, leader of the opposition Democrat Party in Thailand
- Peter Wilkinson, diplomat
