= Alex Reed =

Alex Reed or variant, (man or woman) may refer to:

- Alec Reed (1934–2025), British businessman
- Alexander Wyclif Reed (1908-1979), New Zealand author
- James Alexander Reed (1861-1944), American politician
- Julian Alexander Arnott Reed (1936–2022), Canadian politician
- S. Alexander Reed (born 1979), American professor and musician
- Lexi Reed, a character from A.N.T. Farm

== See also ==
- Alec Reed Academy, British school of Studies

Reed

- Reed Alexander (born 1994), American actor
- Reed Alexander (Canadian football) (born 1984), Canadian CFL football player
- Alyson Reed (born 1958), American dancer
- Allison Reed (born 1994), American ice dancer

Other

- Alex Reid (disambiguation)
- Alexander Read (disambiguation)
