= Ethiopiaid =

UK charity focused on Ethiopia

- Founded: November 8, 1989
- Founder: Sir Alec Reed
- Type: Fundraising and education
- Purpose: Increase access to education, improve maternal health care, increase opportunities for women & girls, support health and welfare for vulnerable people
- Location: PO Box 5168, Bath, BA1 0RR.
- Region served: Ethiopia
- Method: Fundraising and support for local partners in Ethiopia
- Key people: Alexandra Chapman, Chair of Trustees, Anna Lord, CEO
- Revenue: £2,438,872 (2024)
- Employees: 10
- Volunteers: 0
- Website: ethiopiaid.org.uk

Ethiopiaid is a UK-registered charity that generates public funding for local charity partners in Ethiopia. It supports organisations who work in poverty reduction, healthcare, empowerment of women & girls, elder support, children with disabilities, and educational access.

== History ==
Ethiopiaid was founded in 1989 by Alec Reed. Reed is the founder of Reed (Company) along with several international charities and charitable website the Big Give. Sir Alec established the charity after a visit to Ethiopia in the late 1980s.

== Fundraising ==
Ethiopiaid raises money through regular postal campaigns, containing updates on partner development and opportunities to support their work.

Ethiopiaid describes itself as non-political and non-religious, funding its work almost entirely through private donations rather than government grants. The organization's fundraising strategy focuses heavily on securing income from a variety of individual and private sources, including regular giving programs, direct mail appeals, legacy donations, and community fundraising events. Financial reports indicate that the charity actively invests a portion of its income into awareness and support campaigns to grow its donor network, operating on the principle that increased investment in fundraising ultimately channels more total funds back to projects in Ethiopia. This approach allows the charity flexibility in how it allocates resources to local partners working on maternal health, education, and poverty reduction programs across the country.

== Operations ==
Ethiopiaid raises funds for local Ethiopian charities and works through long-term partnerships rather than individual projects The organisation is headquartered in Bath, England. The UK office is run by a team of ten.

For the financial year ending December 2024, the charity reported income of £2.4m and expenditure of £2.6m, of which £1.9m was spent directly on charitable activities.

=== Women & girls ===
Ethiopiaid partners with local organisations that provide support and opportunities for women and girls. Through their projects, they raise awareness of the dangers of FGM, child marriage and provide free screenings and treatments for cervical cancer.

=== Maternal health ===
Ethiopiaid partners with local organisations who provide life-saving maternal healthcare and support for women across Ethiopia. Through their projects, they are:

Improving access to maternal healthcare and supporting women to make informed decisions about their own health. Ensuring women have access to antenatal care, trained midwives during childbirth, and care and support post-birth. Working to prevent and treat childbirth injuries such as obstetric fistula. Helping women make informed choices about their future through access to sexual and reproductive health services.

=== Poverty reduction ===
Ethiopiaid's partners seek to relieve poverty by working with local Ethiopian organisations, including Support for Children, Women and Older People (SCWOP), which provides food, clothing, medicine and house repairs to elderly people living in poverty.

=== Education ===
Hope Enterprises University College opened in 2012 as Ethiopia's first non-profit liberal arts university college; Ethiopiaid has supported the college since inception. Hope Enterprises seeks to advance education in Ethiopia by giving citizens the knowledge and expertise needed to work themselves out of poverty.

=== Disability ===
Ethiopiaid works with Cheshire Services in Addis Ababa to help disabled children and adults.

=== Emergency funding ===
Ethiopiaid's emergency fund enables the charity to respond quickly during times of crisis and avoid delays to the provision of assistance whilst a public fundraising appeal is launched.

Ethiopiaid also helps to support long-term recovery. Once the emergency has passed and international agencies have moved on, Ethiopiaid's Emergency and Recovery Fund offers support to affected communities to help them rebuild their lives and strengthen their resilience to future crises.
