= Alexander Read =

Alexander Read may refer to:

- Alexander Read (surgeon) (1786–1870), president of the Royal College of Surgeons in Ireland
- Alex Read (born 1991), Australian soccer player

== See also ==
- Alex Reid (disambiguation)
- Alex Reed (disambiguation)
- Alex Reade, member of the band Make Them Suffer
