= Womankind Worldwide =

Womankind Worldwide is a UK-based, feminist global women's rights organisation that works in solidarity with women's movements around the world to bring about lasting change in women's lives. Founded in 1989, Womankind partners with women's movements in Africa and Asia to support them in their efforts to change discriminatory laws and policies, challenge gender norms and stereotypes, and provide transformative programmes and services to women and girls.

In nearly 30 years, Womankind, together with its partners, has supported over 18 million women and girls across more than 70 countries.

== Background ==
Founded by Sir Alec Reed, Womankind was launched on International Women's Day on March 8, 1989. Kate Young was appointed as executive director. On March 8, 2019, the charity will celebrate its 30th anniversary.

== Approach ==
Womankind does not have staff or offices in the countries where they work - instead, they support existing women's movements to strengthen and grow to support women's rights in their local and national contexts. Womankind does this by providing technical support, communications, connectivity and shared learning, advocacy platforms, and funding opportunities.

Together with their partners, Womankind takes a three-pronged approach, working towards:

1. Policies and laws that tackle discrimination and protect women,
2. Universal access to appropriate, quality services that protect and restore women's rights, and
3. Social change that supports the rights of all women and girls.

== Aims ==
Womankind works with its partners in pursuit of three main aims:

1. An end to all forms of violence against women and girls,
2. Women's economic rights and control over resources, and
3. Women's equal influence in decision making and ability to exercise political power.

== Focus countries & partners ==
In 2016-2017, Womankind identified five focus countries on which to focus the majority of their work:

- Ethiopia
- Kenya
- Nepal
- Uganda
- Zimbabwe

=== Ethiopia ===
In Ethiopia, Womankind works with a number of partners focusing on issues including sexual violence, disabilities, entrepreneurship among women, feminist education, and safe houses and shelters for women escaping violence. For example, they are currently supporting partner Setaweet to introduce feminist curriculum to secondary schools in Addis Ababa, Ethiopia.

=== Kenya ===
Womankind's partners in Kenya work primarily around legal advocacy for women's rights, providing free legal services to women, and lobbying and advocating for women with disabilities. Currently, they are working in long-term partnership with Federation of Women Lawyers - Kenya to increase women's political participation and access to justice, as well as strengthen community response to early and forced marriage as well as female genital mutilation (FGM).

=== Nepal ===
In Nepal, Womankind supports partners working primarily with Dalit women, women with disabilities, and indigenous women to enable them to participate in the country's women's movement. Other partners are working or have worked around producing feminist research, guaranteeing the rights of lesbian, bisexual and transgender women, gender-based violence, and women's broader political participation. For example, Womankind partner Feminist Dalit Organization - FEDO lobbying efforts prior to Nepal's 2017 local elections helped result in nearly 7,000 Dalit women being elected to local governments across the country.

=== Uganda ===
Womankind's partners in Uganda work around several issues including gender-based violence, environmental causes, and issues affecting rural women. In March 2018, Womankind and partners National Association of Professional Environmentalists and National Association for Women's Action in Development published Digging Deep, a feminist research report revealing the harmful impacts of Uganda's land rush on women.

=== Zimbabwe ===
In Zimbabwe, Womankind is supporting partners in strengthening civil society prior to the 2018 general elections, supporting feminist research and documentation in the countries, increasing the voices of lesbian, bisexual and transgender women, supporting women with disabilities, and advocating for improved access to justice, among other issues. For example, through Womankind's partnership with Zimbabwe Women Lawyers Association, the organization provides legal services to women for cases on domestic violence, divorce, land and property disputes, and child support.

=== Other countries ===
In addition, the charity continues to work with partners in Afghanistan, Bolivia, Ghana, Liberia, Peru, Sierra Leone, Tanzania, and Zambia.

== Media & campaigns ==
Womankind is active on social media, including on Twitter, Facebook, and Instagram. Their website also hosts an active blog, as well as case studies featuring women impacted by Womankind's partners. In the media, Womankind has been featured in the Huffington Post, the Independent, and the Guardian.

The organization is also active in advocacy and campaigning efforts, partaking in annual campaigns for 16 Days of Activism as well as International Women's Day.
