= The Big Give =

British charitable organization

Big Give
- Founded: 2007
- Founder: Sir Alec Reed
- Type: Charity
- Registration no.: 1136547
- Location: Dragon Court 27-29 Macklin Street, Strand, London WC2B 5LX
- Method: Online match funding; showcasing charities; connecting charities with supporters
- Members: 9,987 registered charities
- chair: James Reed
- Key people: Trustees: James Reed (Chair), Richard Reed, Isabel Kelly, Nicola Reed, Nigel Marsh, Lisa Reed
- Employees: Five
- Website: thebiggive.org.uk

Big Give is a British non-profit organisation that enables donors to find and support charity projects in their field of interest. It was founded in 2007 by Sir Alec Reed CBE. His son James Reed CBE became Chair of Trustees in 2019.

Big Give reports having raised over £452 million for thousands of charity projects since fundraising began in 2008, including £3.67 million raised for the Disasters Emergency Committee's Ukraine Humanitarian Appeal, £5.5 million for COVID-19 relief efforts and over £2 million for those affected by the Grenfell Tower fire. Its Christmas Challenge 2025 raised £57.4 million, the highest amount to date, surpassing Comic Relief and BBC Children in Need as Britain's largest fundraising event of the year.

Big Give's main activity is online match funding campaigns, where donations made by members of the public are matched by larger donations from notable philanthropists. These philanthropists, also known as "Champions," typically make six-figure donations.

Big Give's campaigns have been promoted by celebrities, including Leonardo DiCaprio, Stephen Fry, Dame Judi Dench, Emilia Fox and David Walliams.

The organisation is one of the UK's largest philanthropic endeavours. It has set a target of raising £1bn by 2030. Sponsorship and managerial support is provided by the Reed family's Reed Foundation, which is funded by an 18% stake in Reed Group, leading The Guardian to write that Reed Group employees "...effectively work one day a week to fund good causes". James Reed was appointed Commander of the Order of the British Empire (CBE) in the 2023 New Year Honours for services to business and charity.

== History ==
In 1985 Alec Reed established the Reed Foundation to serve as the Reed family's philanthropic arm. The Foundation was endowed with £5m from the Reed Group's £20m sale of its Medicare division, with Alec Reed using his windfall from the sale to give the Foundation an 18% stake in Reed Group.

Reed established Big Give after becoming frustrated at the process of finding and assessing charities of interest to him. He drew on his experience of compiling searchable websites to create an online database of charities, browsable by sector and with detailed information about their structure and accounts.

Big Give initially aimed to connect charities with wealthy individuals seeking to donate £100,000 or more, but charities noted that donors were deterred by the high minimum donation, so Reed later experimented with time-limited match funding, reasoning that "...there is nothing like a deadline to bring out [donors'] competitive nature."

In 2008, Big Give launched its flagship online match funding campaign, The Christmas Challenge. Reed put up £1 million of his own money in match funding. It was matched by other donors within 45 minutes. Since then the format has been refined, with an increase in the number of philanthropist 'Champions' and the amount of match funds available. The Challenge is now the UK's largest online match funding campaign.

== Fundraising activities ==
=== The Big Give Christmas Challenge ===
In 2025, The Big Give Christmas Challenge raised £57.4 million, surpassing on-the-night totals of Comic Relief and BBC Children in Need, making it the largest fundraising campaign of the year in the UK.

The Big Give Christmas Challenge runs annually for seven days from #GivingTuesday, during which time donations to participating charities are doubled. The match funding used to double donations comes from both philanthropic partners of The Big Give ('Champions') as well as a charity's own major supporters ('Pledgers'). Champions include The Reed Foundation, The Childhood Trust, Candis, The Garfield Weston Foundation, The People's Postcode Lottery and The Waterloo Foundation.

Each charity has a ring-fenced matching pot used to double public donations until the pot is empty or until the Christmas Challenge ends, whichever is sooner.

The Christmas Challenge has run every year since 2008.

Year	Activities
2008	£2 million raised in 45 minutes for 240 charities. The Reed Foundation was given a Third Sector Award for Innovation in Fundraising in recognition of the success of this challenge.
2009	£8.5 million raised, beating a target of £6 million and benefiting 174 charities. Fundraising from the challenge period was doubled by a fund of £1.5 million from the Reed Foundation and additional funds from trustees and major donors.
2010	The Big Give hosted its launch party for the Christmas Challenge at Fortnum & Mason's London store. Attendees raised £80,000 in one night. £9.3 million was raised for 323 charities; donations from the public were doubled by a number of sponsors, including Arts & Business, Reed Specialist Recruitment, Reed Foundation, Garfield Weston Foundation, Candis Magazine and Ethiopiaid.
2011	£12 million raised for 424 charities
2012	Raised over £10 million for 350 charities, including £4 million raised in a two-hour period.
2013	£11 million raised for 387 charities. Online donations were processed at a peak of 390 transactions per minute. The UK Cabinet Office joined as a Charity Champion, alongside Reed Foundation, Candis Magazine, ICAP, Ethiopiaid and the Garfield Weston Foundation
2014	£11 million raised for 367 charities. The initiative was recognised at the UK Charity Awards, with The Big Give winning the Fundraising Technology Category.
2015	£7.1 million raised for 258 different charities, including 1,192 donations made in the first five minutes, worth £2.5 million.
2016	£7.2 million for 332 charities across 17,000 donations
2017	£11.3 million for 528 charities across 29,000 donations
2018	£13.3 million for 589 charities. The average donation was £175; over 35,000 people donated.
2019	£15.6 million for 588 charities.
2020	£20.1 million raised for 764 charities, including Disasters Emergency Committee, The Prince's Trust and Friends of the Earth, across 71,000 donations.
2021	£24.1 million raised from 79,000 donations for 928 charities, including The Prince's Trust, Mayor's Development Fund, homeless charity The Passage and beekeeping development charity Bees for Development Trust.
2022	£28.6 million raised from 81,271 donations for 1021 charities, including Jamie's Farm, Vision Foundation and The Wave Project.
2023	£33 million raised from 94,000 donations for 1077 charities, including Stick 'n' Step, Pipal Tree and The Children's Trust.
2024	£44.7 million raised from 119,000 donations for 1250 charities, including Turquoise Mountain and Tree Aid.
2025	£57.4 million raised from 152,000 donations for 1591 charities, including City Harvest and The Felix Project

Alec Reed died on Giving Tuesday 2025, an event that James Reed publicly acknowledged during that year’s Christmas Challenge campaign.

=== Small Charities Challenge ===
In June 2025, The Big Give launched the Small Charities Challenge, an annual match funding campaign aimed at grassroots organisations with annual incomes below £1 million. The 2026 campaign raised over £2.6 million, with matched donations provided by The Reed Foundation among others.

=== Women & Girls Match Fund campaign ===
In March 2022 Big Give inaugurated its annual Women & Girls Match Fund campaign, on behalf of vulnerable, disadvantaged, or underrepresented women and girls in England and Scotland. Big Give doubles public donations to participating charities, drawing on funds provided by a grant from the Tampon Tax Fund. The 2026 campaign raised £1.8m for 150 participating charities.

=== Arts for Impact Match Funding ===
Announced in October 2023, the Arts for Impact Matched Funding campaign aims to support UK arts and culture charities working towards societal change.

In 2026, the campaign raised a reported £3.2 million for 280 arts and culture charities, based on 13,838 public donations that were matched by philanthropists, foundations and companies.

=== The Summer Give ===
Since 2015, Big Give has used its match funding model to run an annual Summer Give campaign in partnership with The Childhood Trust. The Summer Give offers match funding to charities alleviating child poverty in London, specifically aiming to keep children well-fed, safe and productively engaged during the summer holidays. It has helped over 87,658 children through partnerships with over 150 projects throughout London. In 2017, the Summer Give raised £778,680 for 36 participating charities.

=== Earth Raise (formerly The Green Match Fund) ===
Earth Raise is a UK-based environmental fundraising campaign coordinated by Big Give in partnership with WaterBear, South Wind Blows, and the Environmental Funders Network. The campaign supports charities focused on environmental issues by using matched donations to amplify public giving. The 2026 campaign raised £10.9 million for 338 participating charities, from 47,243 donations.

Originally launched in 2021 as The Green Match Fund, the initiative was rebranded as Earth Raise in April 2025 to reflect its growing scale and ambition. The inaugural Earth Raise campaign raised £8.1 million for 307 environmental charities, including the Sustainable Food Trust, Rewilding Britain, Friends of the Earth, The Wildlife Trusts, and Surfers Against Sewage. Previous campaigns have received support from Monty Don, Stephen Fry, Ben Goldsmith, Megan McCubbin and Chris Packham.

=== Kind2Mind ===
Big Give's Kind2Mind is an annual match-funding drive in support of charities that address, prevent, research, treat and campaign for mental health issues. In the 2024 appeal, £2.4 million was raised for 160 charities, including the Edinburgh Children's Hospital Charity and The Passage.

=== Cut the Crap ===
Big Give has raised £88k for Surfers Against Sewage's Cut the Crap campaign, which lobbies against the pollution of Britain's waterways.

== Emergency appeals ==
Big Give has adapted its match funding model to emergency appeals, which are launched quickly and in co-ordination with the Disasters Emergency Committee to raise money. Emergency Challenge Funds have been launched in response to the 2023 Turkey–Syria earthquake, Typhoon Haiyan in the Philippines, earthquakes in Haiti and Nepal and other international emergencies. In October 2017 £232,446 was raised for Rohingya refugees escaping violence in Myanmar's Rakhine State. The funds were distributed to seven charities working directly with Rohingya refugees, including the British Red Cross and UNICEF UK.

=== Afghanistan Emergency Appeal ===
In August 2021, Big Give match-funded Afghanaid's Afghanistan Crisis Appeal, raising £78,257 to deliver emergency support to families uprooted by regional conflict and famine. Donations helped to provide domestic assistance kits for heating, food preparation and hygiene.

=== COVID-19 response ===
Big Give has raised over £5.5m through various COVID-19 relief campaigns, including £1.36m for the National Emergencies Trust COVID-19 Emergency Appeal, with donations from 1,900 individuals. The appeal funded food and sanitation supplies to support the elderly and vulnerable across the UK. Co-funders included the Julia and Hans Rausing Trust, the Reed family, Reed Foundation and Cazenove Capital (Schroders). In July 2020 The Big Give raised £3.2m for Champions for Children, a joint campaign with The Childhood Trust to match fund 94 charities in support of vulnerable children in London affected by the 2020 COVID-19 pandemic.

In April 2021 Management Today gave its Special Recognition Award to Reed for the firm's COVID-19 relief efforts.

=== DEC Ukraine Humanitarian Appeal ===
Following the 2022 Russian invasion of Ukraine, The Big Give raised over £3.67m for the Disasters Emergency Committee Ukraine Humanitarian Appeal, helping DEC charities and their local partners provide food, water, health assistance, protection and trauma care within Ukraine and neighbouring countries.

=== Grenfell Tower fire ===
The charity raised over £2.6m in an online match funding campaign for those affected by the Grenfell Tower fire. The appeal raised £1 million in the first 48 hours and £2m a week later. In total the appeal raised £2,612,646. The Charity reported funding from the Reed Foundation, The Cadogan Estate, Julia and Hans Rausing and The Bjorgolfsson Family among others.

== Other activities ==
=== Philanthropy in Schools ===
The Big Give's 'Philanthropy in Schools' programme seeks to encourage the next generation of philanthropists by promoting research into charities and charitable donations. Participating schools partner with a sponsor who funds Big Give vouchers which students donate to their chosen charities. Students compete to make the best presentation on their preferred charities; the winning team receives an additional donation to its chosen charity.

=== The Big Give Trustee Finder ===
The Big Give Trustee Finder advertises vacancies for charitable trusts, organised by skill, interest and location. In 2013 the service was extended to feature vacancies on the Reed website for six weeks.

=== The Big Advice Column ===
In 2012 The Big Give introduced an online advice column, The Big Advice Column, where a team of experts answer questions posed by charities.
