= Armed Forces Covenant =

Mutual obligation between the British public and the Armed Forces

The Military Covenant or Armed Forces Covenant is a term introduced in 2000 into British public life to refer to the mutual obligations between the United Kingdom and the British Armed Forces. According to The Guardian, "it is an informal understanding, rather than a legally enforceable deal, but it is nevertheless treated with great seriousness within the services". It was coined in Soldiering – The Military Covenant (booklet), UK: Ministry of Defence, April 2000, and has now entered political discourse as a way of measuring whether the government and society at large have kept to their obligations to support members of the armed forces.

The Covenant is a term used mainly by the British Army, other British armed forces and the media in relation to the question of adequate safeguards, rewards and compensation for military personnel who risk their lives in obedience to military orders derived from the policy of the elected civilian government. It is argued that armed forces personnel should expect to be treated fairly by the Crown and expect the support of the United Kingdom, society and the government.

The Ministry of Defence states "In putting the needs of the Nation, the Army and others before their own, they forgo some of the rights enjoyed by those outside the Armed Forces. So, at the very least, British soldiers should always expect the Nation and their commanders to treat them fairly, to value and respect them as individuals, and to sustain and reward them and their families."

Although the term "covenant" implies some form of legal guarantee or contract, there is in fact no basis in UK law, custom or history for such covenant. Members of the armed forces are recruited and maintained by successive quinquennial Armed Forces Acts as a specific, albeit continuing, derogation from the Bill of Rights 1689, which otherwise prohibits the Crown from maintaining a standing army. The Armed Forces Acts guarantee no such covenant, neither do the Notice Papers served on recruits when attested on enlistment.

There has been increased media coverage of the so-called military covenant as the government has been accused of failing to meet it; this criticism came from not just the media, but also several previous Chiefs of the Defence Staff said the government needed to do more to help support injured troops and their families.

The Armed Forces Act 2021 amended the Armed Forces Act 2006 to create the following legal obligation on specified bodies in all four home nations of the UK. This is known as the Armed Forces Covenant Duty. This legal obligation applies to these specified bodies whether or not they have signed the Covenant pledge and are those responsible for providing local services in the areas of healthcare, education and housing, such as local authorities, governing bodies of schools, and NHS bodies.

In the settings of NHS Primary Care, NHS Secondary Care, and local authority delivered healthcare services, the following functions: provision of services; planning and funding; and co-operation between bodies and professionals.

In compulsory education settings, the following functions: admissions; educational attainment and curriculum; child wellbeing; transport; attendance; additional needs support; and, for England only, use of Service Pupil Premium funding.

In housing functions: allocations policy for social housing; tenancy strategies (England only); homelessness; and disabled facilities grants.

In 2023, the Labour Party's Shadow Minister of State for Veterans' Affairs, Rachel Hopkins, committed the Party to fully enshrining the Covenant into law under a future Labour government and providing additional funding for mental health provision for veterans.

== The Covenant ==
The introduction to ‘Soldiering – The Military Covenant’ reads:

Soldiers will be called upon to make personal sacrifices – including the ultimate sacrifice – in the service of the Nation. In putting the needs of the Nation and the Army before their own, they forego some of the rights enjoyed by those outside the Armed Forces. In return, British soldiers must always be able to expect fair treatment, to be valued and respected as individuals, and that they (and their families) will be sustained and rewarded by commensurate terms and conditions of service. In the same way the unique nature of military land operations means that the Army differs from all other institutions, and must be sustained and provided for accordingly by the Nation. This mutual obligation forms the Military Covenant between the Nation, the Army and each individual soldier; an unbreakable common bond of identity, loyalty and responsibility which has sustained the Army throughout its history. It has perhaps its greatest manifestation in the annual commemoration of Armistice Day, when the Nation keeps covenant with those who have made the ultimate sacrifice, giving their lives in action.

== History ==
Recognition of a special bond of mutual obligations between the state and its Armed Forces dates back more than 400 years: a 1593 Elizabeth I statute provided for a weekly tax on parishes not to exceed 6d on the pound, so that disabled army veterans "should at their return be relieved and rewarded to the end that they may reap the fruit of their good deservings, and others may be encouraged to perform the like endeavours", and it is thought that this "unspoken pact" may date back to the reign of Henry VIII.

However, it was not until 2000 that the Army published 'Soldiering – the Military Covenant', setting out the obligations on the soldier to make personal sacrifices in the service of the nation, and stated that the armed forces must be sustained by the nation. The code had been drafted over the course of three years by senior officers led by a Brigadier. The main author was Major-General Sebastian Roberts.

The term 'Military Covenant' was heavily promoted by General Sir Richard Dannatt, who was Chief of the General Staff from 2006. The existence of government obligations to the armed forces was accepted by the Prime Minister Tony Blair during a keynote lecture on Defence given on 12 January 2007 when he stated that the covenant needed to be renewed, and that "it will mean increased expenditure on equipment, personnel and the conditions of our armed forces, not in the short run but for the long term."

== Political debate ==
In September 2007 The Royal British Legion launched a campaign which accused the Government of failing to meet its commitments under the Covenant. The Legion highlighted the case of a 23-year-old paratrooper, injured in battle, who was awarded £152,150 despite injuries requiring care for the rest of his life. It also criticised the practice of treating soldiers in wards alongside civilian patients. In his conference speech that October, Conservative Party leader David Cameron referred to the Covenant and said "Mr. Brown, I believe your government has broken it."

Responding to the Royal British Legion's campaign, the Secretary of State for Health Alan Johnson announced in November 2007 that armed forces veterans would get priority treatment on the National Health Service, and those injured would be treated immediately in hospital rather than go through waiting lists. Prescription charges would also be waived. A tight budget settlement for the Ministry of Defence in 2007 saw five former Chiefs of the Defence Staff launch personal criticism of Prime Minister Gordon Brown in a simultaneous House of Lords debate.

In upholding the claim of six Gurkha soldiers for the right to settle in Britain at the end of their service, Mr Justice Blake's judgment in September 2008 recited the Military Covenant before observing that granting them residence in Britain "would, in my judgment, be a vindication and an enhancement of this covenant".

In opposition David Cameron asked Andrew Murrison MP to establish the Military Covenant Commission. Chaired by the author and ex-RAF pilot Frederick Forsyth CBE and with experts including the Falklands veteran Simon Weston OBE its report heavily influenced the current government's thinking. On 25 June 2010, The Times newspaper reported that Prime Minister David Cameron announced plans to enshrine the Military Covenant in law – such a development would allow British servicemen and servicewomen to sue the State for breaches of the Military Covenant. In February 2011 the Conservative-Liberal Democrat government decided that there was no need to make the Covenant law, proposing instead to cover it in an annual report to parliament – a Labour attempt in an opposition day debate to reverse this was defeated by 86 votes.
