= Reed (company) =

Employment agency based in the United Kingdom

- Trade name: Reed Executive
- Type: Employment Agency
- Industry: Recruitment
- Founded: Hounslow, United Kingdom 7 May 1960
- Founders: Sir Alec Reed
- Headquarters: London, United Kingdom
- Number of locations: 180
- Key people: James Reed, Chairman and Chief Executive Officer (CEO)
- Services: Employment agencies, recruitment, human resource consulting, outsourcing
- Owners: Privately owned
- Number of employees: 4500
- Website: www.reed.com

Reed is an employment agency based in the United Kingdom. The company was founded in 1960 by Sir Alec Reed CBE. Reed's son, James Reed CBE, is the current chairman and chief executive officer (CEO).

The company's website, reed.co.uk, established in 1995, was the UK's first employment website. In 2014, Alexa ranked reed.co.uk as the UK's largest employment agency website. Reed Specialist Recruitment is listed in The Sunday Times Fast Track 100 league of Britain's largest private companies. Reed offers training, outsourcing and HR consultancy services.

In 2024 Reed reported annual revenue of £1.3 billion. In 1985, 18% of the company was donated to the Reed Foundation, the Reed family's philanthropic arm. The Foundation created and continues to sponsor The Big Give, one of the UK's largest philanthropic endeavours.

== Reed Group companies ==
Reed Group has 4500 employees across 350 business units and 180 locations worldwide, dealing in 30 recruitment specialisms. Its headquarters and the majority of its operations are in the UK, alongside offices in the Middle East, Asia and continental Europe.

The company has three main divisions:

=== Reed Specialist Recruitment ===
Reed Specialist Recruitment provides employment services for permanent, contract, temporary and outsourced jobs, as well as IT and HR consultancy. Industry specialisms include accountancy, banking and finance, office support, education, health and care, HR, management procurement, science, technology, hospitality and leisure. It also offers postgraduate study programmes, business training and personal development courses. The firm also provides screening services.

=== Reed Online Ltd ===
Reed.co.uk is one of the UK's largest recruitment sites. Its featured jobs come from employers, recruitment agencies and Reed consultants. The site reports receiving approximately 4 million job applications per month, through 14,000 registered recruiters. It also claims a database of 12 million jobseekers worldwide, gathered through online registrations and the Reed office network. The website Reedglobal.com offers jobs across industry sectors world-wide. In 2018 the firm began a partnership with Google to integrate its vacancies into search results. Reed Online's managing director is Simon Wingate.

=== Reed in Partnership ===
Reed in Partnership is dedicated to assisting unemployed individuals in their transition from welfare to employment. Established in 1998 as part of the Blair Government's New Deal Programme, this division has since enabled more than 250,000 people to secure employment and currently employs over 2,500 staff. Reed in Partnership is a former partner to the UK's National Citizen Service.

Reed Environment is a Reed in Partnership initiative aimed at boosting Britain's net-zero skills base. Launched in July 2023, the project is establishing a number of Energy Academies across the UK by 2025, providing essential skills training for assessors and installers of net-zero technologies, such as solar power, electric vehicles, and heat pumps. Additionally, the academies will offer job opportunities, energy advice, and consultancy solutions related to retrofitting homes for energy efficiency. The initiative commenced with Reed's strategic investment in the Oxford Energy Academy, an OFSTED-recognised training provider.

== History ==
=== 1960–1971 ===
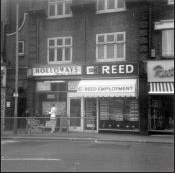
First branch of Reed Employment agency, 1960

Aged 26, Reed opened the first branch of Reed Employment on 7 May 1960 located on Kingsley Road, Hounslow, in West London, with £75 taken from his Gillette pension fund. The firm then expanded to a second branch in Feltham and ten more branches over the next three years. In the early 1960s, most employment agencies were located in first or second floor offices. Copying the example of rival Alfred Marks, Reed began moving his offices to ground floor locations on main shopping streets.

=== 1971 flotation ===
The end of the 1960s saw a bull market in UK share prices, prompting stock market flotations by a number of rival employment agencies, including Brook Street Bureau and Alfred Marks.

By 1969 Reed Employment had opened 75 branches. Although profitable, financing the expansion caused cash flow difficulties. These were compounded when the firm's bank began to reduce its overdraft facility, which the firm had been using as working capital. Faced with a shortage of capital, Reed decided to float the business. Reed Employment floated on the London Stock Exchange on 13 January 1971, at an offer price of 12s 6d, a price/earnings ratio of 13.1 and a yield of 4.4%. Alec Reed retained a third of the company, having given a further third to his three children and floated the remaining third (1.3 million shares, for just over £10.97m in 2014 terms). At their 1980s peak, the shares increased to 150 times their offer value; they averaged 80 times offer value for most of the 1990s. The Reed Family retained effective control of the company post-flotation, through the combination of Alec Reed's shareholdings and that of his children. Alec Reed used part of his flotation windfall to found Reed Business School in 1972. The school's original remit was to train accountants, later extended to include training for Reed staff.

Alec Reed later described the flotation of Reed Employment as his greatest mistake in business, citing the administrative and financial burdens of running a public company, claiming: "...you become a metaphorical unpaid greyhound on a racetrack called the stock market." Reed has said that he started his Medicare retail pharmacy business partly to help maintain Reed Employment's stock price during slumps in the wider economy. Medicare was founded in 1973 and sold to Dee Corporation in 1985 for £20 million; Reed used his £5m windfall from the sale to start the Reed Foundation, which still owns 18% of the Group's shares.

=== 1972–1983 ===
In 1972 turnover doubled to £10m, with profits just under £1m, helped by rising demand for temporary workers and by inflation. Profits halved by 1975, partly due to the 1974 oil crisis. Reed expanded into new divisions and set up specialist recruitment firms, including what became known as Reed Health, Reed Finance and Reed Computing, among others. All were established under a holding company (Reed Executive). By 1979 the company had returned to profitability, achieving £3.1m on a turnover of £32m. During the 1970s and 1980s, Reed donated 1% of its pre-tax profit to the Charities Aid Foundation.

Reed also experimented with publishing during this time, including Roundabout magazine, designed to be given away free to young women at Tube stations.

=== 1983–1995 ===
The recession of the early 1980s prompted Reed's first trading loss (£1.64m in 1983) and the closure of agency branches, from 130 to 87. By March 1984 profitability returned, to £1.2m. Reed shares hit their all-time peak in early 1987, reaching £1.80; during this period The Reed Foundation bought back shares, with the Reed family's holding rising to 70% of the company. In 1988 profits increased to £10.54m.

In 1986 Alec Reed was diagnosed with colon cancer and given a 40% chance of survival. He went on to completely recover. In 1992 Reed's son James joined as a non-executive director, becoming operations director in 1994 and chief operations officer in 1995.

=== 1995–2005 ===
In 1995 pre-tax profits reached £8m on a turnover of £150m, up 30% on 1994. Reed launched further specialist divisions in the year, including Reed Learning, Reed Graduate and Reed Managed Services. The firm also began Reed Restart, a not-for-profit enterprise to provide ex-prisoners with rehabilitation and training. In 1999 the firm announced a 40% rise in interim profits.

James Reed became chief executive officer in 1997. During this period the firm became one of the first two private sector companies implementing the Blair government's Welfare-to-Work programme, christened by Labour as "The New Deal".

Paymaster General Geoffrey Robinson contacted Alec Reed in 1997 with a proposal to outsource some of the work of traditional job centres. The project eventually became Reed in Partnership.

=== 2005–present ===
Former logo of the company

In 2005 James Reed took the company back into family ownership. In 2008 the company cut 25% of its workforce in the wake of the 2008 financial crisis.

==== Reed.co.uk ====
Reed.co.uk was the UK's first online recruitment site. The launch version of the site contained few job listings, functioning more as a brochure. A second iteration, launched in 1997, featured job vacancies typed in by Reed's office receptionist in between her other duties.

The first person to obtain a job through the site lived 60 miles away from the hiring company. As Alec Reed later wrote: "That would not have happened had he walked into the local branch, so it opened my eyes to the internet’s potential". Reed extended its investment but, with online recruitment still in its infancy, few companies were interested. In response, Reed employee Paul Rapacioli suggested the company open up the website so that any company - including Reed customers and Reed's direct competitors - could advertise jobs free of charge, converting the site from a walled garden into an aggregator. Alec Reed later cited the move as the company's "breakthrough" online. The new site was launched in 2000 and by the end of that year had attracted 42,000 vacancies. Rapacioli received a £100,000 bonus for his suggestion. In 2007 the site moved to a fee-paying model. Reed sites collectively received 199 million visits in 2017; as of 2019 it hosts approximately 250,000 job applications per day.

== Advertising and sponsorship ==
=== Short Film Competition ===
In September 2009, Reed launched its annual Short Film Competition with a top prize of £10,000. The competition, run via YouTube, invites filmmakers to submit a short film of no more than three minutes in length centred around a specific theme. Partners include BAFTA, Channel Four, the British Council, Total Film and Creative England. The judging panel has included Jaime Winstone, Eugene Simon, Stuart Cosgrove, Roger Chapman, Paul Weiland and Nicola Reed.

=== Love Mondays campaign ===
The company's TV and online advertising is presented under the Love Mondays slogan, which aims to change the way employees perceive the start of a new workweek after the weekend. Reed seeks to encourage employees to look forward to Mondays and see them as an opportunity to kick-start their career goals. The campaign features the creation and sharing of content on social media platforms with the hashtag #LoveMondays. Campaign content includes motivational quotes, career tips, and success stories, and often features James Reed. From 2008 to 2018 the company ran a nationwide advertising campaign fronted by actor and comedian Rufus Jones, who played James Reed as a caricature of a comic book superhero.

=== Sponsorships and social initiatives ===
Reed is a signatory to the Armed Forces Covenant, in support of current and former service personnel in their transition away from the military. The firm also sponsors TfL's Art on the Underground scheme.

==== COVID-19 response and Keep Britain Working ====
During the COVID-19 pandemic Reed relaunched the Keep Britain Working campaign, originally launched after the 2008 financial crisis. Alongside 26 other businesses and industry figures, such as Sir Alan Sugar, Lord Bamford, Luke Johnson and James Timpson, Reed called upon CEOs to protect jobs by sacrificing management salaries and company profits; Reed declined his own salary from the family business during the pandemic. For its various COVID relief efforts, the company received Management Today's 2021 Special Recognition Award.

== Controversy ==
In 2002, shares in the Reed Health Group (which had been demerged from the parent company in 2001) fell 25% after the surprise firing of the chief executive and finance director of Reed Health, a company demerged from the wider Reed Group in 2001.

Reed Health was initially well received by investors, with the value of its shares briefly surpassing that of its former parent company. Shortly after demerger, the firm began a programme of expansion by acquisition led by Chief Executive Christa Echtle and finance director Desmond Doyle.

In May 2002, Reed Health used cash and shares to acquire medical employment agency Locum Group, following which Echtle and Doyle tabled a proposal at Reed Health's AGM to permit them to buy further companies without shareholder approval. Had the motion been passed, Reed Health would have the power to dilute the Reed family's shareholding to the point where the family risked losing control of the company. The proposal was voted down. The Reed family then opposed the re-election of Echtle and Doyle as directors, effectively firing them during the AGM. News of the pair's departure took the city by surprise. Some financial commentators, such as Patience Wheatcroft of Management Today, criticised the firings and called for better corporate governance from Reed's board.

Reed later cited the incident as shaping the Reed family's decision to take the company private. In April 2003 the family launched an offer to buy back shares in Reed Executive for 140p per share, an 18% premium on the pre-announcement closing price; in 2005 the family regained control of Reed Health after a premium bid. Reed companies are now privately owned and family-controlled.

== Founder succession ==
In 2000 Alec Reed stepped down from the position of chairman to become non-executive chairman, before relinquishing all executive responsibilities in 2004 and assuming the title of founder-at-large. James Reed became chairman in 2004. The company is now run by a triumvirate of directors, consisting of James Reed and two non-family directors making decisions on a majority-voting basis.

== Charities ==
The Reed Foundation is a charitable foundation set up by Reed. The Foundation owns an 18% share in the Reed Group. Donations include a one million Rand grant to the Nelson Mandela Foundation to support education in South Africa, and two million pounds to the West London Academy in Ealing, later renamed the Alec Reed Academy.

=== The Big Give ===
The Big Give is a Reed Foundation initiative to introduce donors to charitable projects in their field of interest. It is reportedly one of the UK's largest philanthropic initiatives. Launched in 2007, it reports raising £452m (2026) and has set a target of raising £1bn by 2030. The Big Give is sponsored and supported by the Reed Foundation's stake in Reed Group, which led The Guardian newspaper to write that Reed staff "...effectively work one day a week to fund good causes".

The initiative has raised over £5.5m for COVID-19 relief initiatives and £3.67m for the Disasters Emergency Committee's Ukraine Humanitarian Appeal.

==== Other Reed initiatives ====
In July 2024, the Reed Foundation initiated a program to donate £10,000 each week to 52 different charities over the course of a year, with a Reed employee randomly selected to nominate their preferred charity. By April 2025, the Reed Foundation aims to have donated a total of £520,000 on behalf of 52 employees.

The £1 million Sir Alec Reed Prize was established by the Reed Foundation in 2024 to celebrate Alec Reed’s 90th birthday and the 65th anniversary of the Reed Group. It supports young people with poor mental health into secure employment.

In 2026, Reed Group launched the All About Business Entrepreneurs Fund, a programme offering grants and mentoring to young entrepreneurs.

== Awards and recognition ==
James Reed was appointed Commander of the Order of the British Empire (CBE) in the 2023 New Year Honours for services to business and charity.

Reed was ranked #28 in Glassdoor's Top 50 Best Places to Work 2019, the highest placement for a recruitment company in the list.
