= Alec Reed Academy =

Location
- Bengarth Road; Northolt, Greater London, UB5 5LQ; England
- Coordinates: 51.5434°N 0.3845°W

Information
- Type: Academy
- Motto: Proud to Learn
- Established: 1955; 71 years ago as Walford Secondary School
- Local authority: Ealing
- Department for Education URN: 134369 Tables
- Ofsted: Reports
- Principal and CEO: P Cosby
- Gender: Mixed
- Age: 3 to 19
- Enrolment: 1686
- Website: www.alecreedacademy.co.uk

Alec Reed Academy is a mixed all-through school and sixth form located in the Northolt area of the London Borough of Ealing, England. The school operates nursery, primary, secondary and sixth form departments for pupils aged 3 to 19.

Its predecessor, Walford Secondary School, was founded in 1955 as a secondary modern school for 11- to 16-year-olds. It later became Walford High School under the comprehensive system. The school changed its name to Compton High School and Sports College in 2001, after the Middlesex and England cricketer, Denis Compton. In 2003, Compton High School and Northolt Primary School were merged on the same site to form West London Academy, one of the first academies to be created in England. The school moved to new buildings on the same site in 2005. In 2012, it was renamed Alec Reed Academy, after its late sponsor, the entrepreneur Alec Reed.

The school shares its campus with John Chilton School, a special school for pupils with a physical and/or a medical disability. The two schools share many facilities and the entire campus is wheelchair accessible.

In June 2015, Ofsted gave the academy a "Good" rating. The rating was reaffirmed in June 2018, when Ofsted noted the school's strengths in ".....learning in the early years and primary phases" and its general sense of inclusivity. For maths and writing, the academy achieved a "Well Above Average" rating for its overall performance at end of key stage 2 in 2017.

== Notable former pupils ==
=== Walford High School ===
- Gaz Choudhry, wheelchair basketball player
