= Bees for Development =

International charity

- Founded: 1993
- Type: Non-governmental organisation
- Purpose: Beekeeping
- Location: Monmouth, Wales, UK
- Coordinates: 51.8118°N 2.71542°W
- Region served: Africa, Asia and The Caribbean
- Product: Honey; Wax
- Website: beesfordevelopment.org

Bees for Development is an international charity working to alleviate poverty through beekeeping. Beekeeping contributes to supporting sustainable livelihoods in poor and remote communities; honey bees provide an essential ecosystem service. Bees for Development currently runs projects in Uganda, Zanzibar, Ethiopia and Kyrgyzstan. Its offices are in Monmouth, South Wales.

== History and philosophy ==
Founded in 1993, Bees for Development works in partnership with beekeepers and international organisations, such as Apimondia, Keystone Foundation, and the Food and Agriculture Organization (FAO). The charity promotes beekeeping in support of poor and remote communities as well as in support of biodiversity. It focuses on the use of appropriate technology and values, and respects local skills. It believes that self-reliance and empowerment of the poor can be enhanced through access to knowledge and information, and through trade in bee products. It also advocates less intervention with bee production and using hives free of internal frames.

Bees for Development Trust is the working title of The Troy Trust, a registered charity under English law, set up in 1999. It is governed by a board of trustees and supported by patrons, including Monty Don, Bill Turnbull and Sting.

== Activities ==
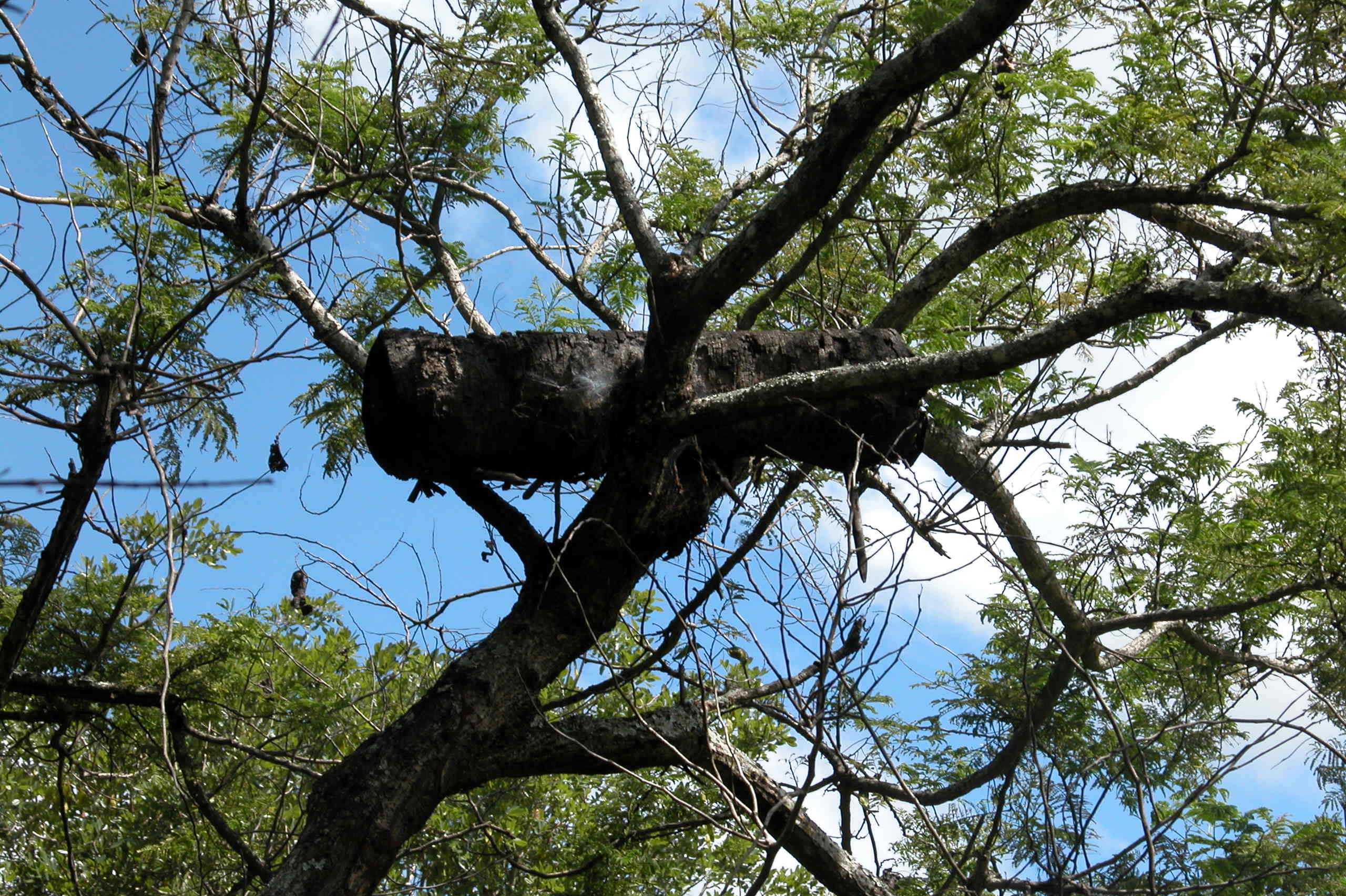
Bark hives in Mozambique are widely and successfully used by beekeepers to produce honey and beeswax

The charity publishes the Bees for Development Journal which focuses on appropriate beekeeping technologies, sharing lessons learnt in different countries worldwide.

The Uganda Honey Trade Project works with local beekeepers associations, including ApiTrade Africa, to help raise incomes through strengthening honey trade. In Zanzibar, Bees for Development runs a partnership project with Danish charity DANTAN, focusing on boosting the honey industry on Unguja, the main island of Zanzibar, and on the island of Pemba. In Kyrgyzstan, funding from the Darwin Initiative, who encourage biodiversity in poor countries, has been secured. Bees for Development also disseminates training resources worldwide, manages an on-line library of beekeeping information and organises beekeeping safaris.

The charity is also assisting an area resident with her attempts to preserve a Monmouthshire farm. The resident had established a hive at her farm three years ago after taking a beekeeping course. In the summer of 2011, the colony was thriving. However, the following mild winter led to increased bee activity and ultimately the death of the colony, as determined by Nicola Bradbear Bees for Development. The charity suggested top-bar hives that approximate a wild bee nest, in lieu of more traditional frame hives. The organisation is assisting the farmer with establishing an apiary that has both types of hives. Visitors to the farm will learn about two different approaches to beekeeping. In addition, plants beneficial to both hive and wild bees, including borage and phacelia, are being planted.

== Projects ==
=== 2006–2009: Research in bees, biodiversity, and forest livelihoods in India ===
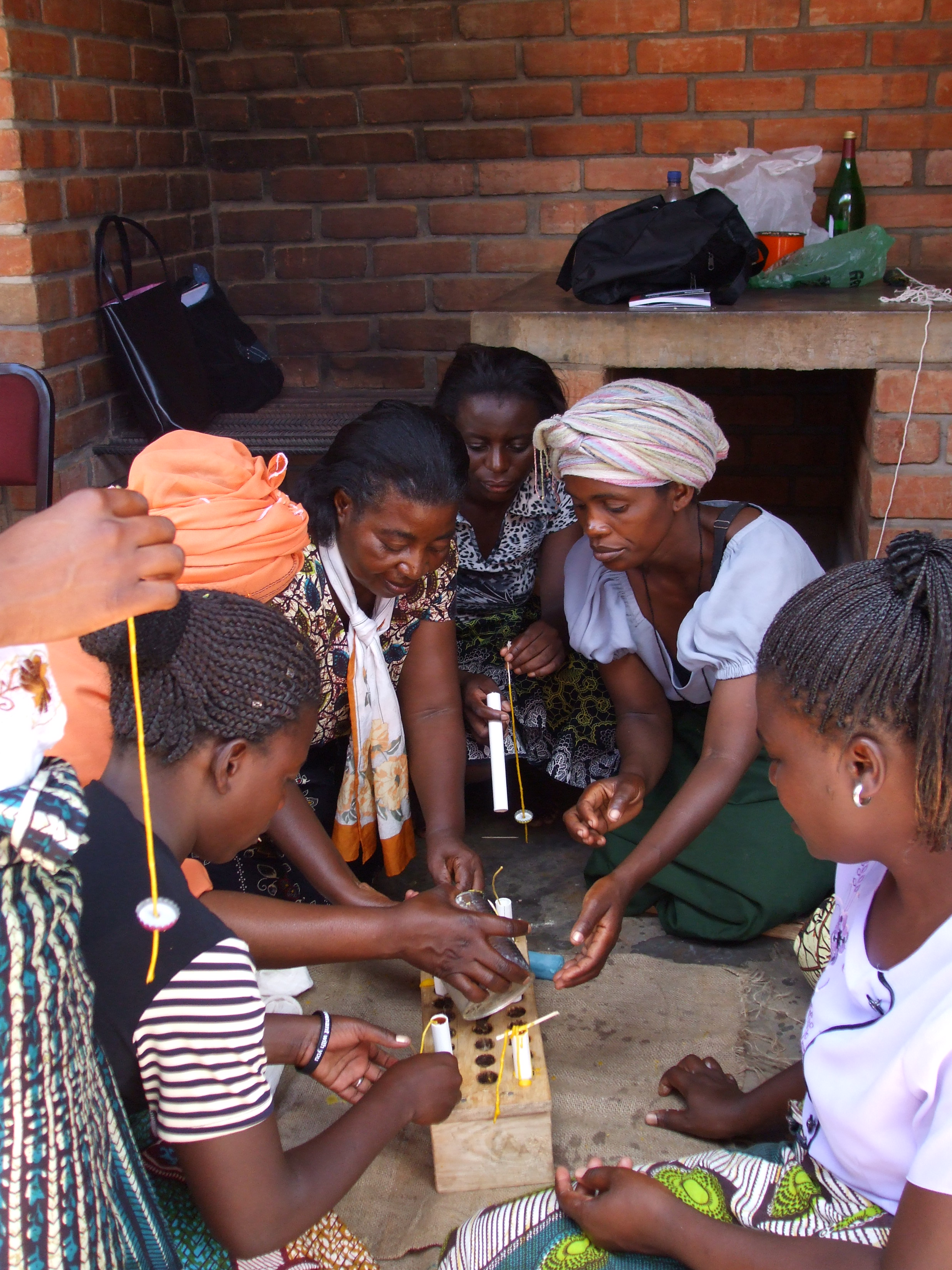
Mbawemi Women's group making beeswax candles in Malawi

The research project of bees, biodiversity and forest livelihoods in the Nilgiri Biosphere Reserve began on 1 June 2006. This-three-year project was funded under the UK Government-funded Darwin Initiative to study the interdependencies between bees, biodiversity, and forest livelihoods in the Nilgiri Biosphere Reserve of the Western Ghats, India. The project was implemented locally by the Keystone Foundation, working in partnership with local indigenous communities and Forest Department staff, and three UK-based partners: Professor Janet Seeley, The School of Development Studies, University of East Anglia; Dr. Nicola Bradbear, Bees for Development; and Professor Simon Potts, The Centre for Agri-Environmental Research, University of Reading.

=== 2006–2008: Strengthening trade in honey and other bee products in Uganda ===
The aim of this pilot project (2006–2008) was to increase trade in honey, bringing more income to poor, rural beekeepers. The Project was funded by the UK-based donor, Comic Relief, and implemented by the Uganda Export Promotion Board (UEPB), The Uganda National Apiculture Development Organisation (TUNADO), and Bees for Development. Beekeeping is practised widely in Uganda. The local market for table honey is significant, and demand in urban areas outstrips supply. Trade opportunities for other bee products are also growing. However, inefficiencies in the supply chain and the low capacity of producers to understand and negotiate markets, means that this activity is not achieving its full potential in bringing income benefits to the poor.
