= Alec Reed =

British businessman and philanthropist (1934–2025)

Sir Alec Reed CBE FCMA FCIPD
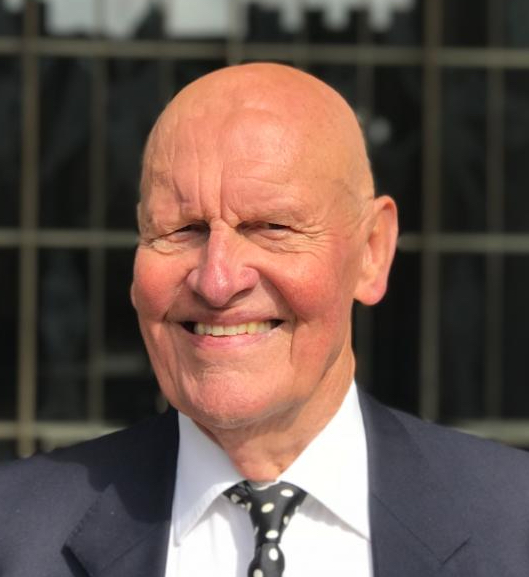
- Reed in 2022
- Born: 16 February 1934; Hounslow, Middlesex, England
- Died: 2 December 2025 (aged 91)
- Education: Drayton Manor Grammar School
- Occupations: Founder of: Reed Executive; Reed Foundation; Reed Business School; The Big Give; Ethiopiaid; Womankind Worldwide; Reed Restart; Alec Reed Academy
- Organization: Reed
- Known for: Philanthropy, entrepreneurship
- Movement: Humanists UK
- Spouse: Lady Reed (m. 1961)
- Children: 3, including James

Sir Alec Edward Reed (16 February 1934 – 2 December 2025) was a British business executive and philanthropist who founded the Reed Group Ltd, one of the UK's largest private businesses. Knighted for services to business and charity in 2011, Reed was a high-profile charity donor and organiser. Initiatives he founded have collectively raised over £452 million, often in support of women, addiction recovery, overseas development, education and the arts.

Reed founded seven charities, several companies, two schools and was the author of four business books. His final job title at Reed was Founder at Large. In 2023, The Times newspaper described him as "...the man who revolutionised philanthropy".

On receiving his knighthood, he remarked, “Without business there would be no charity - but without charity, what’s the point of business?”

== Early life ==
Reed was born in Hounslow, Middlesex on 16 February 1934. His father Leonard was a lithographic artist for the UK's Ministry of Information during WWII, supervising the production of a number of government information posters, including the original version of the Ministry's "Keep Calm and Carry On" poster. Reed's mother Nancy was a housewife and former employee of the Prudential Insurance firm. In his autobiography, Reed writes that his earliest memory is listening with his family to Neville Chamberlain's 1939 speech declaring war on Germany, a speech that alarmed his parents into fleeing London in a neighbour's car the same day, thinking invasion imminent, only to return "...before teatime" after concluding that nowhere in the country would be safe.

A child of The Blitz, Reed described his childhood as generally "secure", though he also said that much of his early motivation came from feeling overshadowed by his older brother. Along with a milk round, Reed's first business venture was started alongside his brother while both were still children: the pair made and sold toy soldiers forged from lead that had been salvaged from local bombed-out houses.

Reed attended Drayton Manor Grammar School. At the end of his first year his school report said: "Conduct very unsatisfactory. He is lazy, inattentive and exerts himself to prevent his neighbours from working. He could do much better if he were more ambitious". Reed failed his 11-Plus exam; he left school aged 16 to work for a motor vehicle exporter in London's Fenchurch Street, having also failed to get the grades to enter agricultural college and pursue his ambition of becoming a farmer. Reed's mother encouraged him to study a Chartered Secretary's course in the evenings during his day job at the exporters.

He was called up to National Service in 1952. He tried for a commission with the Royal Engineers but was rejected after his Brigadier deemed him to be a "...muddled thinker". Reed left the army in 1954 to work as a trainee accountant for Gillette in Osterley, having passed his Chartered Secretary qualification the year before, at the third attempt.

Keen to be self-employed, Reed pursued a number of sideline businesses while still at Gillette, including making his own brand of aftershave that he brewed in his mother's kitchen and sold door-to-door. Reed also began working evenings and weekends in an estate agency in Hounslow, again while still at Gillette. The agency’s premises were split into two businesses, with one side selling property and the other side selling carpets. Noticing that the carpet business was struggling, Reed approached the owner (who was the father of Reed's then-girlfriend) and offered to rent the carpet portion of the premises for his fledgling employment agency, funding the launch with £75 taken from his Gillette pension fund. On 7 May 1960, the 26-year-old Reed opened the first branch of Reed Employment. It went on to become one of Britain's largest privately owned businesses, now employing over 4500 people.

== Career at Reed ==
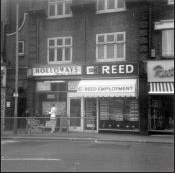
First branch of Reed Employment agency, 1960

Reed held the positions of Chief Executive, Executive Chairman, non-executive Chairman and Founder at Large during his career at Reed Group Ltd. In 1997, he stepped down as chief executive to become chairman, handing control of the company to his son James; to mark the handover, Reed presented his son with a conductor's baton in a glass case. Reed became non-executive chairman in 2000 and Founder at Large in 2004, a position he assumed after his son James succeeded him as chairman in the same year.

Reed remained a significant minority shareholder, through both his personal holding and that of the Reed Foundation, to which he donated 18% of all shares in the company.

=== Other business ventures ===
In 1970, Reed founded Inter-Company Comparisons with Anthony Jewitt, now ICC PLC, a wholly owned subsidiary of a Swedish business group. In 1974, he also founded Medicare Limited, a 50-branch chemists chain with 500 employees, now part of Superdrug. Reed would later write that he started Medicare simply to smooth out the cash flow performance of his then-publicly quoted companies. He is a noted critic of the administrative burden of running public companies, and has compared his experience of running the Reed group as a public company to being an "...unpaid greyhound on a racetrack called the stock market". He would later blame the stress of running Medicare for his diagnosis of colon cancer; the business was sold as part of his recuperation, at his wife's insistence.

From 1985 to 1989, Reed was the honorary chairman and chief executive of Andrews and Partners Estate Agency. He took the business from a loss of £297,000 in 1985 to profits of just over £1m in 1986. The profits were used to buy out the existing shareholders and transfer ownership to three Christian charities. He writes in his autobiography that "Most of the non-executive directors were also devout Christians who prayed before every meeting. Despite this, I found them extremely difficult to deal with in subsequent negotiations...that episode may have been the beginning of my disillusionment with Christianity".

== Philanthropy ==
Reed described encouraging philanthropy as his “…main mission". In 2007 he launched The Big Give, now one of the UK's foremost charitable initiatives. He founded several other charities, including Womankind Worldwide, Ethiopiaid, Reed Restart at Holloway Prison, Women at Risk, and the Alec Reed Academy.

In 1985, he established The Reed Foundation, a charitable foundation that provides much of the seed funding for his charity work.

=== The Reed Foundation ===
The Reed Foundation is the main vehicle for the Reed family's philanthropic activities. Originally established in 1972 as the Reed Charity, it was later reconstituted in 1985 with Alec Reed’s £5 million personal proceeds from the £20 million sale of Medicare. The Foundation owns 18% of the Reed Group, prompting Reed’s remark that the company’s employees “work one day a week for charity.” In an October 2024 interview, Reed said that he was encouraging other firms to copy this model: “If they give away 20% [of profits] they’ll never regret it. The return they’ll get in respect of clients and staff is enormous.”

As of 2023 the Foundation reported total assets and investments in excess of £25 million.

The Foundation has financed numerous charitable initiatives, including:

==== The Big Give ====
Founded in 2007, The Big Give is a non-profit, charitable website which enables donors to find and support charity projects in their field of interest. Reed referred to it as “…a Wikipedia for big givers" and his "biggest success". The Big Give has raised over £452 million for UK-registered charities and aims to raise £1bn by 2030. It has supported 15,000 ongoing charity projects via more than 600,000 donors. It hosts £1.3bn worth of projects in need of funding. In forming The Big Give, Reed created an advisory Board of Philanthropists including Lord Bell, Lord Gavron CBE, Lord Haskins, Sir Adrian Cadbury, Sir Charles Dunstone, Baroness Lane-Fox of Soho, Jon Snow and Michael Spencer.

The Big Give inverts the traditional model of charity funding in which donors are contacted by charities, to a model in which donors effectively "compare and shop" for charity projects, and then have their donations matched by other donors. Reed founded the site in response to receiving an unmanageable number of appeals from charities seeking donations from high-profile philanthropists. The project was designed to encourage wealthy philanthropists seeking to make donations between £100,000 and £10m. Having attracted few donors at that level, Reed switched to a match funding model, in which he put up £1m and requested other donors to match him; reportedly the site’s users matched Reed’s £1m within 45 minutes of it going live. The site now makes use of "challenge matching", in which donors compete to be the first to kickstart a given charity project.

In addition to projects uploaded by charities, the site also runs emergency appeals—such as those responding to natural disasters like the 2014 Philippines hurricane, humanitarian crises such as the 2013 Syrian refugee crisis, and domestic emergencies including the 2017 Grenfell Tower fire. Separately, it operates the annual Christmas Challenge, in which Reed’s funds, together with those of external foundations, are combined with pledges from charities’ major donors to double public online donations. The 2025 Christmas Challenge raised £57.4 million for over 1500 charities.

The Big Give also helps charities to find trustees and runs educational programmes in schools in order to raise children’s awareness of philanthropic giving.

==== The Sir Alec Reed Prize ====
The £1 million Sir Alec Reed Prize was established by the Reed Foundation to celebrate Reed’s 90th birthday and the 65th anniversary of the Reed Group. Designed to help fund young people with poor mental health into employment, the inaugural prize was awarded to UK Youth in 2024. As part of the same initiative, the Foundation also launched a year-long campaign in which it donated £10,000 each week to charities nominated by Reed employees. The campaign raised £520,000 for 52 charities, including Brixton Soup Kitchen and the Royal British Legion.

==== Ethiopiaid ====
Ethiopiaid works with local community partners in Ethiopia to alleviate poverty, support the elderly, empower women and girls, help children with disabilities and increase access to health care and education. Reed founded the charity with a £1m donation in 1989, having visited the Ethiopian capital in 1987 on a fact-finding tour organised and accompanied by Jembra Teferra, a relative of Haile Selassie and wife of a former mayor of the city. Reed had initially planned on promoting entrepreneurship in the area, but upon arrival was struck by Addis Ababa’s poor public sanitation, especially in the kebeles (poor urban neighbourhoods). Reed subsequently underwrote a two-year project to develop the kebeles, and arranged pledges for additional financial assistance from Water Aid, Help the Aged and Band Aid. Ethiopiaid has gone on to donate £28m in funding and match-funding. The charity now partners with around 14 local Ethiopian organisations, providing around £2m in donations.

One of Ethiopiaid's best-known and longest-standing partners is the Addis Ababa Fistula Hospital, which helps to treat Ethiopian women marginalised by the social and medical complications arising from post-birth fistula. Ethiopiaid also funds reconstructive operations for sufferers of facial disfigurement caused by noma.

==== Womankind Worldwide ====
Womankind Worldwide was set up with a £1m donation from Reed in 1989. The charity supports women suffering from abuse, neglect and illness; it also educates against female circumcision and child marriage. Patrons include Kate Adie, Sandi Toksvig and Lady Helena Kennedy QC. In 2006 Womankind Worldwide was merged with Women at Risk, a UK charity founded by Reed in 1997 in support of women suffering physical and mental abuse. Women at Risk has generated over £1million for beneficiaries, including female survivors of acid attacks. The charity works with more than 40 partner organisations in 15 countries and claims to have reached millions of women and their families worldwide.

==== Reed Restart ====
Founded in HMP Holloway in 1993, Reed Restart was a not-for-profit charity dedicated to the rehabilitation and assistance of women prisoners, helping them to become more employable on release. The pilot scheme at HMP Holloway was extended to provincial gaols, including Eastwood Park Women’s Prison.

==== The Alec Reed Academy ====
This 4-18 coeducational establishment in Northolt, England was one of the first academies to be created under the Learning and Skills Act 2000. It is composed of the former Compton High School and Northolt Primary School. Both areas are close to Reed’s childhood home in Hounslow, and to his former school, Drayton Manor Grammar. Reed’s involvement with the academy began in November 2001, when he sponsored Compton High School.

In 2012, the West London Academy was renamed The Alec Reed Academy, in honour of its sponsor. The school has a sports and enterprise specialism. Its catchment area has a high percentage of Indian, Pakistani and Polish families; 52% of pupils do not speak English as a first language. 80% of its pupils achieve Level 4 or above in reading, writing and maths.

A 2010 Ofsted inspection saw the school rated as "Good"; Ofsted’s 2014 inspection, which was marked under Ofsted’s revised scoring regime, saw the school listed as "requiring improvement". The 2014 report noted that “…senior managers and leaders have accurately identified the areas of the academy requiring further improvement. Their actions are beginning to have an impact on improving teaching and raising standards".

Reed spoke of the "tremendous freedom" he was given to shape the academy’s approach, noting that he decided the school’s aims and ethos, chose its headmaster and commissioned the design of its buildings, from Foster & Partners. Reed contributed £2m of the £40m required to launch the academy. He has also described his involvement as “…an interesting lesson in what happens when private-sector culture meets state-funded culture". He writes of incurring criticism for his ideas on education, notably his view that the school did not need a significant library in the internet age, nor should it teach foreign languages, owing to the multilingual composition of the school's intake and the primacy of the English language in global business.

=== Other philanthropic projects ===
Reed founded a number of not-for-profit initiatives prior to the Reed Foundation, including the Reed Business School and Addicts Rehabilitation.

==== Reed Business School ====
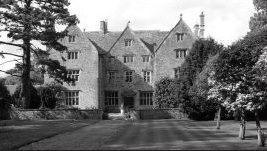
Reed Business School

Reed Business School is a not-for-profit residential and day accountancy college specialising in qualifications ACCA, CIMA, ICAEW and more recently AAT. The school is based in Reed’s former home, a 15th Century Jacobean manor house in Little Compton, England. The house was purchased with the proceeds of the Reed Group’s stockmarket flotation in 1971, after which Reed donated the house to the Reed Charity. It opened in 1972 as The Reed College of Accountancy, changing its name to Reed Business School after the formation of the Reed Educational Trust in 1980. The school’s trading profits are donated to the Trust and distributed to numerous educational charities.

==== Addicts Rehabilitation ====
Reed’s first charity was set up in the 1970s to help the recovery and rehabilitation of drug addicts. In a 2011 interview with CIMAGlobal.com, Reed said

"About ten years after we started Reed, the company had become big enough to be made public. I was based in Bond Street and at about that time the Observer newspaper ran a series of articles about people who were having difficult lives. They invited potential volunteers to contact charity organisations, and because I was in Bond Street, I went to work with a drug addiction charity in Covent Garden. Then people began to find out that I was an employment agent and they were all after me to help them get jobs. A lot of them weren't job ready, though, so we started an employment agency for drug addicts [ARC – Addicts Rehabilitation Charity]."

In the 1970s, Reed bought Keveral Farm in Cornwall where addicts could spend time in recovery. From 1989 to 1992, Reed served on Oxfam's fundraising committee. Reed described his approach to philanthropy in a 2013 interview with Coutts:

"I believe it’s better for donors to separate the decision about how much money to spend on charitable giving, from the act of giving to charity. By deciding how much you want to give away and ring-fencing it in a foundation, you can elevate the satisfaction you get from giving and make it easier to make the gift. Once you’ve done that, you can continue your research and decide which good causes you wish to support. I call this 'Disneyland Giving': theme park visitors pay once at the gate and are then free to enjoy the rides. I'm still enjoying giving away money I 'spent' on charity 20 years ago."

Reed also personally supported a range of smaller UK charities, such as The Passage (homelessness) and The Branch Trust (deprived families).

In 2022, he launched Reed Innovation Scholarships, providing financial support to undergraduate students at Royal Holloway, University of London. The scholarship rewards and encourages creative problem-solving.

Reed later served as an Enterprise Fellow for The Prince's Trust.

== Arts patronage ==
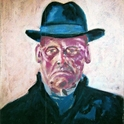
Nice Hat, by Alec Reed, exhibited in the EAC Over 60s Art Awards

Reed credits his wife Adrianne as being responsible for his interest in the arts. He was a ballet enthusiast and a noted donor to the Royal Ballet, reportedly donating £100,000 to the Royal Opera House. Reed also invested in English choreographer Matthew Bourne's original ballets Dorian Gray and Cinderella. Reed described Bourne as "a creative genius".

Reed was an amateur painter, with a focus on portraits. He wrote that painting "...particularly helped me get through chemotherapy after my second run-in with cancer". He studied with portrait painter Ken Payne and at the Heatherley School of Fine Art. Reed won a national prize for those over sixty years old for his self-portrait Nice Hat, in which he is portrayed wearing a trilby.

== Teaching ==
Reed became a member of the governing council of Royal Holloway, University of London, in 1979, subsequently becoming the chairman of the college's finance committee. After the formation of the Royal Holloway School of Management in 1990, Reed recruited high-profile guest speakers and donated to the library. He also taught an interactive entrepreneurship course for undergraduates at the school called LIES (Leadership, Innovation and Enterprise Studies). Reed made his students turn up on time "...to introduce them to the basics of business life"; latecomers were fined £1, paid into a fund which purchased confectionery for the class.

In 1999 Reed was asked by Tony Blair to investigate a decline in teacher training enrolment.

== Personal life and death ==
Reed was married with three children and 11 grandchildren. He and his wife lived in a two-bedroom house in Kensington and a converted cottage in Little Compton, Warwickshire. Debrett's listed his interests as family, portrait painting, theatre, cinema, tennis, horse riding, ballet and bridge. He had a lifelong interest in farming and equestrianism, having joined the Young Farmers aged 14. In 2009 he purchased at auction nine lots of land comprising 1,600 acres of the estate of Kiddington Hall in the Cotswolds, Oxfordshire; Reed wrote of plans to turn the land into a residential equestrian estate.

Reed said that his early charity work was informed by his conversion to Christianity in his 20s. He later became an atheist and a member of Humanists UK. The Reed Foundation does not fund religious organisations.

He twice recovered from cancer, after receiving a diagnosis of colon cancer in 1986 and non-Hodgkin's lymphoma in 2003. The latter left a significant scar on his forehead, which he referred to as his "Mail On Sunday headline", after being in dispute with the newspaper at the time of his diagnosis.

When asked how he would like to be remembered, Reed said:

"I hope people will remember me as both entrepreneurial and lucky - someone who laughed a lot and attempted to improve the lives of others. I do not just mean the poor in Africa...I also mean those rich people suffering from financial obesity. I hope I have been able to direct their giving in a more fulfilling way and to introduce them to charities with which they feel a strong bond but which they might never have encountered were it not for The Big Give... Above all, I hope they will think of me as an ideas man."

Reed died on 2 December 2025, at the age of 91. Electronic advertising screens commemorating his life as a "Hounslow boy" were displayed in his honour on the elevated sections of the M4 in that area of London in 2026.

== Publications ==
Reed was the author of several books, including:

- Returning to Work (1989), published by Kogan Page: ISBN 9780749400286
- Innovation in Human Resource Management (2001), published by CIPD: ISBN 9780852929285
- Capitalism is Dead: Peoplism Rules (2002), published by McGraw-Hill: ISBN 9780077103699
- I Love Mondays – Autobiography (2012), published by Profile Books; ISBN 9781846685163

== Awards and honours ==
- Made a Knight Bachelor for services to business and charity in the 2011 New Year Honours.
- Invested as a Commander of the Order of the British Empire (CBE) for charitable services in the 1994 New Year Honours.
- A Fellow of the Chartered Institute of Management Accountants (FCMA); awarded its outstanding contribution to business performance award.
- Fellow of the Chartered Institute of Personnel and Development (FCIPD).
- Fellow of the Beacon Charitable Trust, an Honorary Fellow of Royal Holloway, University of London and an Honorary Doctor of The Open University.
- Honorary Degree from Richmond, The American International University in London.
- Professor of Enterprise and Innovation at Royal Holloway until 2001; visiting Professor to London Guildhall University, which merged with the University of North London to become London Metropolitan University in 2002, where he also has an Honorary Doctorate; an Honorary Professor of Warwick University.
- Awarded a Beacon Fellowship and overall winner of the 2010 Beacon Prize.
- Recruitment International's Hall of Fame, inducted 2011.
