= List of people with surname Williams =

Williams is a common European surname. This list provides links to biographies of people who share this common surname.

== Common combinations of given name and surname Williams ==
- Aaron Williams
- Abraham Williams
- Adam Williams
- Al Williams
- Alan Williams
- Albert Williams
- Alex Williams
- Alexander Williams
- Alfred Williams
- Alice Williams
- Allison Williams
- Amy Williams
- Andrew or Andy Williams
- Angela Williams
- Ann or Anne Williams
- Anna Williams
- Annie Williams
- Anthony or Antony Williams
- Antonio Williams
- Arnold Williams
- Arthur or Art Williams
- Ashley Williams
- Avery Williams
- Barbara Williams
- Barney Williams
- Barry Williams
- Basil Williams
- Ben Williams
- Benjamin Williams
- Benny Williams
- Bernard or Bernie Williams
- Bert or Bertie Williams
- Betty Williams
- Bill Williams
- Billy Williams
- Bob, Bobbie, or Bobby Williams
- Brad Williams
- Brandon Williams
- Brett Williams
- Brian Williams
- Bruce Williams
- Bryan Williams
- Cameron Williams
- Carl Williams
- Carol Williams
- Carroll Williams
- Carson Williams
- Cecil Williams
- Chad Williams
- Charles, Charlie, or Chuck Williams
- Chester Williams
- Chris Williams
- Christine Williams
- Christopher Williams
- Clarence Williams
- Claude Williams
- Clifford or Cliff Williams
- Clyde Williams
- Colin Williams
- Connor Williams
- Corey Williams
- Cory Williams
- Craig Williams
- Daniel or Dan Williams
- Danny Williams
- Darrell Williams
- Darren Williams
- Darryl Williams
- Daryl Williams
- Davey Williams
- David or Dave Williams
- Dean Williams
- Dennis Williams
- Derek Williams
- Derrick Williams
- Desmond Williams
- Devin or Devon Williams
- Diane Williams
- Dick Williams
- Doc Williams
- Don Williams
- Donald Williams
- Doug or Douglas Williams
- Dudley Williams
- Duke Williams
- Duncan Williams
- Earl Williams
- Edward, Ed, or Eddie Williams
- Edwin Williams
- Elijah Williams
- Elizabeth or Elisabeth Williams
- Ellen Williams
- Emily Williams
- Emma Williams
- Eric or Erik Williams
- Eugene Williams
- Evan Williams
- Frances Williams
- Francis Williams
- Frank Williams
- Fred Williams
- Frederick or Frederic Williams
- Freddie Williams
- Gabrielle Williams
- Gareth Williams
- Gary or Garry Williams
- Gavin Williams
- Gene Williams
- Geoff Williams
- George Williams
- Gerald Williams
- Gerard Williams
- Glen or Glenn Williams
- Gordon Williams
- Graham Williams
- Grant Williams
- Greg or Gregory Williams
- Gus Williams
- Guy Williams
- Hank Williams
- Harold Williams
- Harrison Williams
- Harry Williams
- Harvey Williams
- Hayley Williams
- Heather Williams
- Helen Williams
- Henry Williams
- Herbert or Herb Williams
- Holly Williams
- Howard or Howie Williams
- Hugh Williams
- Ian Williams
- Isaac Williams
- Isaiah Williams
- Jack Williams
- Jackie Williams
- James Williams
- Jane Williams
- Janet Williams
- Jarren Williams
- Jason Williams
- Jay Williams
- Jaylin Williams
- Jeff or Jeffrey Williams
- Jenny Williams
- Jeremy Williams
- Jerome Williams
- Jerry Williams
- Jesse Williams
- Jim, Jimmy, or Jimy Williams
- Jody Williams
- Joe Williams
- Joel Williams
- John, Johnnie, or Johnny Williams
- Jonah Williams
- Jonathan, Johnathan, or Jon Williams
- Jordan Williams
- Joseph Williams
- Josephine Williams
- Josh or Joshua Williams
- Joy Williams
- Julie Williams
- Justin Williams
- Karen Williams
- Kate Williams
- Kathleen Williams
- Keith Williams
- Kelly, Kelli, or Kellie Williams
- Ken or Kenneth Williams
- Kendall Williams
- Kenny Williams
- Kent Williams
- Kevin Williams
- Kimberly or Kim Williams
- Kyle Williams
- Larry Williams
- Lauren Williams
- Laurie Williams
- Lawrence Williams
- Lee Williams
- Leo Williams
- Leon Williams
- Leonard or Len Williams
- Leslie Williams
- Lewis Williams
- Liam Williams
- Lily Williams
- Linda Williams
- Lindsay Williams
- Lisa Williams
- Lloyd Williams
- Lorenzo Williams
- Louis Williams
- Lucy Williams
- Luke Williams
- Lynn Williams
- Malcolm Williams
- Marc Williams
- Marcus Williams
- Margaret Williams
- Marie Williams
- Mark Williams
- Marlon Williams
- Marsha Williams
- Martin Williams
- Martyn Williams
- Marvin Williams
- Mary Williams
- Mason Williams
- Matthew or Matt Williams
- Maurice Williams
- Max Williams
- Megan Williams
- Melissa Williams
- Melvin Williams
- Micah Williams
- Michael or Micheal Williams
- Michelle Williams
- Mike or Mikey Williams
- Mitch Williams
- Morgan Williams
- Morris Williams
- Nate Williams
- Nathan Williams
- Nathaniel Williams
- Neil or Neal Williams
- Nelson Williams
- Nicholas, Nick, or Nico Williams
- Nicole or Nicola Williams
- Nigel Williams
- Noel Williams
- Norman Williams
- Oscar Williams
- Owain Williams
- Owen Williams
- Patricia Williams
- Patrick or Pat Williams
- Paul Williams
- Peter or Pete Williams
- Phil Williams
- Philip Williams
- Ralph Williams
- Ray or Raymond Williams
- Reggie Williams
- Reginald or Reg Williams
- Rhys or Reece Williams
- Richard Williams
- Ricky or Rick Williams
- Robert, Rob, or Robbie Williams
- Robin Williams
- Rodney or Rod Williams
- Roger Williams
- Ronald, Ron, or Ronnie Williams
- Rowan Williams
- Rowland Williams
- Roy Williams
- Rupert Williams
- Ruth Williams
- Russell Williams
- Ryan Williams
- Sam Williams
- Samuel Williams
- Sandra Williams
- Sarah Williams
- Scott Williams
- Sean or Shawn Williams
- Seth Williams
- Shane Williams
- Shannon Williams
- Shaun Williams
- Sian Williams
- Sid, Syd, or Sidney Williams
- Simon Williams
- Stacey Williams
- Stan or Stanley Williams
- Stephen or Steven Williams
- Steve Williams
- Stuart Williams
- Susan Williams
- Ted Williams
- Terry Williams
- Thomas Williams
- Tim Williams
- Timothy Williams
- Todd Williams
- Tom or Tommy Williams
- Tony Williams
- Travis Williams
- Trevor Williams
- Ursula Williams
- Van Williams
- Victoria Williams
- Vince Williams
- Virginia Williams
- Wade Williams
- Walter Williams
- Warren Williams
- Wendell Williams
- Wendy Williams
- William Williams
- Willie Williams

== A ==
- Abi Williams, Welsh nationalist politician
- Abigail Williams (1680–1690s), American accuser in the Salem witch trials
- Abiodun Williams (born 1961), Sierra Leonean academic in peacekeeping and conflict prevention and management
- Ace Williams (1917–1999), American baseball pitcher
- A. D. Williams (1933–1990), American football player
- Adele Williams (1868–1952), American artist
- Adele Fay Williams (1859–1937), American artist and newspaper writer
- Adim Williams (born 1964), Nigerian film director
- Adin Williams (born 2000), American para swimmer
- Ady Williams (born 1971), Welsh international footballer and football manager
- Aeneas Williams (born 1968), American football player
- Akintola Williams (1919–2023), Nigerian accountant
- Aiden Williams (born 2000), American football player
- Alain Williams (born 1954), British Olympic sprint canoer
- Alaina Williams (born 1990), American trampolinist
- Alberta Williams King (1904–1974), American; mother of Martin Luther King Jr.
- Alberto Williams (1862–1952), Argentine composer, pianist, pedagogue, and conductor
- Aled Williams (footballer) (1933–2005), Welsh footballer
- Alejandro Williams (born 1969), politician from the Dominican Republic
- Alexis Williams, American activist and engineer
- Alfie Williams (born 2011), English child actor
- Alfie Williams (born 2003), English footballer
- Ali Williams (born 1981), New Zealand rugby union international player
- Alika Williams (born 1999), American baseball player
- Allan Williams (politician) (1922–2011), Attorney-General of British Columbia, 1979–1983
- Allan Williams (1930–2016), businessman, booking agent to The Beatles
- Allyson Williams (born 1947), Trinidadian-British midwife and carnival band organiser
- Alun Williams (1920–1992), Welsh radio presenter
- Alvin Williams (American football) (born 1965), American football player
- Alvin Williams (born 1974), American basketball player
- Alwyn Williams (bishop) (1888–1968), Bishop of Durham, 1939–52, and Bishop of Winchester, 1952–61
- Alwyn Williams (geologist) (1921–2004), Welsh geologist
- Alyson Williams (born 1962), American R&B singer
- Amancio Williams (1913–1989), Argentine architect
- Amanda Williams (judge) (born 1946), American Superior Court Judge
- Amanda Kyle Williams (1957–2018), American crime writer
- Amaree Williams (born 2006), American football player
- Amari Williams (born 2002), British basketball player
- Amaris Williams (born 2005), American football player
- Anastasia P. Williams (born 1957), American politician in Rhode Island
- Anne Williams-Isom (born 1967), American government official, academic, lawyer, and former nonprofit executive
- Andrae Williams (born 1983), Bahamian Olympic sprint athlete
- Andre Williams (musician) (born Zephire Andre Williams 1936–2019), American R&B and rock and roll musician
- Andre Williams (American football) (born 1992), American football running back
- Andrew Williams (born 1970), English cricketer
- Aneyas Williams (born 2005), American football player
- Angel Kyodo Williams (born 1969), American writer and Buddhist priest
- Angelina Love Angel Williams (born 1981), Canadian female pro wrestler
- Anita Álvarez de Williams (born 1931), American anthropologist, photographer and historian
- Annabelle Williams (born 1988), Australian Paralympic swimmer
- Annette Polly Williams (1937–2014), American politician
- Anson Williams (born 1949), American actor
- Archibald Williams (judge) (1801–1863), United States federal judge
- Archibald Hunter Arrington Williams (1842–1895), Democratic U.S. Congressman from North Carolina
- Archie Williams (1915–1993), American athlete
- Archie Williams (footballer) (1927–1985), Scottish footballer
- Arena Williams (born 1990), New Zealand politician
- Aric Williams (born 1982), American football player and coach
- Arlene Williams (1946–2017), American TV chef
- Armstrong Williams (born 1959), American political columnist
- Athol Williams (born 1970), South African poet and social philosopher
- Audrey Williams (1923–1975), American country musician
- Audrey Williams (archaeologist) (1902–1978), Welsh archaeologist
- Augustine Podmore Williams (1852–1916), English mariner
- Austin Williams (actor) (born 1996), American actor
- Avondale Williams (born 1977), British Virgin Islands footballer and manager
- Avril Williams (born 1961), South African rugby union international
- Axel Williams (born 1983), Tahitian international footballer

== B ==
- Barrie Williams (1937–2018), Welsh football manager
- Bart Williams (actor) (1949–2015), American character actor and documentary filmmaker
- Bart Williams (rugby league) (born 1976), Australian rugby league player
- Barton Williams (born 1956), American Olympic-grade hurdler
- Beatrice Williams née Kerr (1887–1971), Australian swimmer and diver
- Beatriz Williams, American author
- Beau Williams (born 1950), American gospel singer
- Becky Williams, American Union activist
- Bedwyr Williams (born 1974), Welsh artist
- Bennett Williams (born 1999), American football player
- Bergen Williams (born 1959), American actress
- Bernice Williams (fl. 1960s), American songwriter
- Beryl Alice Evans née Williams (1922–2006), Australian politician
- Beverly Williams (born 1947), American TV news anchor
- Bianca Williams (born 1993), British sprint athlete
- Bisa Williams (born 1954), American diplomat, Deputy Assistant Secretary, Bureau of African Affairs
- Blake Williams (basketball) (1924–2003), American basketball player
- Blake Williams (born 1985), Australian motorsports competitor
- Blanche Wilkins Williams (1876 – 1936) American educator of deaf children.
- Boo Williams (born 1978), American football player
- Boris Williams (born 1957), English drummer (The Cure)
- Boyce Courtney Williams (born 1954), American educator
- Brackette Williams, American anthropologist
- Brady Williams (born 1979), American baseball player and manager
- Brandi Williams (born 1982), American actress and singer-songwriter
- Brandy Williams, byname of Oracene Price (born 1952); mother and former tennis coach of Serena and Venus Williams
- Brenda Williams (born 1949), South African cricketer
- Brendan Williams (politician) (born 1968), American politician in Washington State
- Brendan Williams (rugby union) (born 1978), Australian rugby union footballer
- Brennan Williams (born 1991), American football player and professional wrestler better known by his ring names Dio Maddin and Mace
- Brent Williams (American football) (born 1964), NFL footballer of the 1980s and 1990s
- Brent Williams (Australian footballer) (born 1978), Australian rules footballer for Adelaide
- Brice Williams (born 2001), American basketball player
- Brinley Williams (1895–1987), Welsh rugby union and rugby league international
- Briony Williams, Australian actress
- Britain J. Williams, American computer scientist
- Brock Williams (born 1979), American football cornerback
- Brooke Williams (born 1984), New Zealand actress
- Brooks Williams (born 1958), American guitarist and singer-songwriter
- Bryce Williams (rugby union) (born 1990), New Zealand rugby union footballer
- Bryce Williams (American football) (born 1993), American football player
- Bryn Williams (born 1977), Welsh chef
- Brynle Williams (1949–2011), Welsh politician
- Brynmor Williams (born 1951), Welsh rugby union international and British Lion & rugby league international
- Buck Williams (born 1960), American basketball player
- Buddug Williams (1932–2021), Welsh actress
- Buddy Williams (country musician) (1918–1986), Australian country musician, singer and songwriter
- Buddy Williams (jazz drummer) (born 1952), American jazz drummer
- Buffy Williams (born 1976), Welsh politician
- Buffy-Lynne Williams (born 1977), Canadian rower
- Butch Williams (born 1952), American ice hockey player
- Buzz Williams (born 1972), American basketball coach
- Byron Williams (American football) (born 1960), American football wide receiver
- Byron Williams (shooter) (born 1965), American responsible for the 2010 shootout with California Highway Patrol officers in Oakland

== C ==
- Cadillac Williams (born 1982), American football player and coach
- Cal Williams, Australian musician, founder member of Yothu Yindi
- Caleb Williams (born 2002), American football player
- Caleb Williams (basketball), American basketball player
- Calvin Williams (born 1967), American football player
- Camilla Williams (1919–2012), American operatic soprano
- Cara Williams (1925–2021), American actress
- Carleigh Williams (born 1992), American soccer player
- Caroline Williams (born 1957), American actress
- Caroline Randall Williams (born 1987), American writer
- Carroll Williams (1916–1991), American entomologist
- Carroll Williams (Canadian football), American player of gridiron football
- Carroll B. Williams Jr. (1929–2024), American research forester and entomologist
- Carwyn Williams (born 1965), Welsh surfer
- Cary Williams (born 1984), American football cornerback
- Casey Kopua née Williams (born 1985), New Zealand netball international
- Cathy Williams, Trinidad-born British novelist
- Cathay Williams (1844–1892), African–American female who posed as a man and enlisted in the US Army
- Cecelie Williams, American politician from Missouri
- Cedric Williams (1913–1999), British cinematographer
- Charley Williams (1928–2009), American boxer
- Charlotte Williams-Wynn (aristocrat) (c. 1754–1830), British aristocrat, daughter of the P.M. George Grenville
- Charlotte Williams-Wynn (diarist) (1807–1869), her granddaughter, British letter-writer and diarist
- Charonda Williams (born 1987), American sprint athlete
- Chavis Williams (born 1989), American football linebacker
- Chaz Williams (born 1991), American basketball player
- Cheswin Williams (born 1987), South African rugby union footballer
- Chino 'Fats' Williams (1933–2000), American actor
- Christina Marie Williams (1985–1998), Filipino–American murder victim
- Christy Williams (born 1980), Canadian motorcycle trials rider
- Chuckie Williams (born 1953), American basketball player
- Ciaran Williams (born 1987), British Olympic handball player
- Chris Williams (1967–1991), American actor and model
- Cindy Williams (1947–2023), American actress
- Cindy Williams (journalist) (born 1964), American journalist
- C. K. Williams (1936–2015), American poet, critic and translator
- Claire Williams (motorsport) (born 1976), deputy team principal of the Williams Formula One racing team
- Claire Williams (athlete) (born 1987), Welsh Paralympian athlete
- Clara Williams (1888–1928), American actress
- Clara Belle Williams (1885–1994), first African-American graduate of New Mexico State University
- Clark Williams (New York politician) (1870–1946), American banker and New York State Comptroller 1909–1910
- Clark Williams (North Dakota politician) (1942–2020), American politician
- Claudia Williams (tennis) (born 1996), New Zealand tennis player
- Claudia Williams (artist) (1933–2024), British artist
- Clayton Williams Jr. (1931–2020), American oilman; Republican gubernatorial nominee in Texas, 1990
- Clifton Williams (1932–1967), American naval aviator and engineer
- Clive Williams (professor) (born 1945), British-born Australian Military Intelligence Officer and academic
- Clive Williams (rugby union) (born 1948), Welsh international rugby union player and British Lion
- Cody Williams (born 2004), American basketball player
- Cole Williams (born 1981), American actor
- Colleen Williams (born 1955), American news anchor
- Colleen Williams (soccer) (born 1991), American soccer player
- Conrad Williams (athlete) (born 1982), British 400m athlete
- Constance H. Williams (born 1944), American politician in Pennsylvania
- Cora Lenore Williams (1865–1937), American educator and author
- Courtney Carl Williams (born 1991), Vincentian Olympic sprinter
- Cress Williams (born 1970), German-born American actor
- Cunnie Williams (1963–2024), American R&B singer
- Curtis C. Williams (1861–1942), American politician and judge from Ohio
- Curtley Williams (born 1990), English footballer
- Cy Williams (1887–1974), American baseball player
- Cy Williams (American football) (1903–1965), American football player
- Cynda Williams (born 1966), American actress
- Cyndi Williams, American voice actress
- Cyril Williams (footballer) (1921–1980), English footballer and manager
- Cyrus J. Williams, film producer

== D ==
- Dafydd Williams (born 1954), Canadian astronaut
- Daley Williams (born 1986), English rugby league footballer and Jamaican international
- Dallas Williams (born 1958), American baseball outfielder and coach
- Damarion Williams (born 1998), American football player
- Damian Williams (wide receiver) (born 1988), American football wide receiver
- Damien Williams (running back) (born 1992), American football running back
- Damion Williams (born 1981), Jamaican international footballer
- Damon Williams (born 1973), American basketball player
- Damond L. Williams (born 1980), American basketball player
- Damonic Williams (born 2004), American football player
- Dana Williams (baseball) (born 1963), American baseball player
- Danial Williams (born 1993), Thai-Australian Muay Thai kickboxer and mixed martial artist
- Danielle Williams (softball), American softball player
- Dar Williams (born 1967), American pop–folk singer–songwriter
- Darious Williams (born 1993), American football player
- Darnell Williams (born 1955), British actor
- Darrel Williams (born 1995), American football player
- Darrent Williams (1982–2007), American football player
- Darrin Williams, American politician from Arkansas
- Darrion Williams (born 2003), American basketball player
- Darwyn Williams (born 1960), American businessman
- Das Williams (born 1974), American politician
- David Adam Williams (1974–2025), American YouTuber known as Adam the Woo
- Davida Williams (born 1986), American actress, singer and photographer
- Davina Williams (born 1985), Australian Olympic freestyle skier
- Davon Williams (born 1972), Montserratian cricketer
- Dawn Williams (born 1973), Olympic middle-distance runner for Dominica
- Dawn Monique Williams (born 1978), American theatre director
- DeAngelo Williams (born 1983), American football player
- Debbie Williams (born c.1956), American teacher and parachute incident survivor
- Dee Williams (American football) (born 1999), American football player
- DeJuan Williams (born 2006), American football player
- Del Williams (1945–1984), American football offensive guard
- Delaney Williams (born 1962), American actor
- Delano Williams (born 1993), sprinter from the Turks and Caicos Islands who represents Great Britain
- Deleta Williams (1935–2024), American politician from Missouri
- Delores Williams (1937–2022), American theologian
- Delvin Williams (born 1951), American football player
- Delwyn Williams (1938–2024), British Conservative politician
- Demetrius Williams (born 1983), American football wide receiver
- Demond Williams Jr. (born 2006), American football player
- Demorrio Williams (born 1980), American football linebacker
- Deniece Williams (born 1950), American singer-songwriter
- Denis Williams (1923–1998), Guyanese painter, author and archaeologist
- Denis John Williams (1908–1990), Welsh neurologist
- Denny Williams (1896–1929), American baseball player
- Denzil Williams (born 1938), Welsh rugby union international
- Deontai Williams (born 1996), American football defensive back
- Deron Williams (born 1984), American basketball player
- Derwin Williams (born 1961), American football player
- Desai Williams (1959–2022), St. Kitts and Nevis-born Canadian Olympic sprinter
- Desi Williams (born 1985), English rugby league footballer
- Dessima Williams (born 1950), Grenadian diplomat
- Destiny Williams (born 1991), American basketball player
- Deunta Williams (born 1987), American football defensive back
- DeWitt Williams (1919–2016), American politician in South Carolina
- Dexter Williams (born 1997), American football player
- Dexter Williams II (born 2002), American football player
- Diana Williams (born 1958), American television journalist
- Dib Williams (1910–1992), American baseball player
- Dicoy Williams (born 1996), Jamaican international footballer
- Dillwyn Williams (born 1929), British medical scientist
- Dino Williams (born 1990), Jamaican international footballer
- Dioh Williams (born 1984), Liberian international footballer
- Dion Williams (1869–1952), American Marine Corps officer
- Dokie Williams (born 1960), American football wide receiver
- Dolly Williams, American businesswoman
- Domanick Williams (born 1980), American football running back
- Dominique Williams (born 1990), American football running back
- Donna Williams (born 1963), Australian writer, artist, singer-songwriter and screenwriter
- Donnie Williams (born 1983), American singer-songwriter
- Donnie Williams (American football) (born 1948), American football player
- Donte Williams (born 1982), American football coach
- Dorian Williams (American football) (born 2001), American football player
- Dorothy Williams (activist) (1928–2011), South African anti-apartheid activist
- Duane Williams (1861–1912), American lawyer fundamental in the foundation of the International Tennis Federation
- Duvall Williams, US Navy rear admiral
- Dyana Williams (born 1953), American radio presenter and journalist
- Dyfri Williams (born 1952), British classical archaeologist

== E ==
- E. Stewart Williams (1909–2005), American architect
- Earle Williams (1880–1927), silent film actor
- Earnest Williams (born 1949), American politician in Georgia
- Ederyn Williams (born 1946), British academic and businessman
- Edson Williams (born 1966), visual effects supervisor
- Eduardo Williams (born 1987), Argentine film director
- Edy Williams (born 1942), American actress
- Eifion Williams (born 1975), Welsh footballer
- Eirian Williams (born 1955), Welsh snooker referee
- Eka Esu Williams (born 1950), Nigerian immunologist and activist
- Elbert Williams (1908–1940), African-American civil rights leader
- Elbert Williams (baseball) (1907–1972), American baseball player
- Elisha Williams (1694–1755), Congregational minister, legislator, soldier, jurist, and rector of Yale
- Elisha Williams (basketball) (born 1978), Canadian Paralympic wheelchair basketball player
- Eliud Williams (born 1948), President of Dominica 2012–2013
- Ellery Williams (1926–2017), American football player
- Elliot Williams (born 1989), American basketball player
- Ellis E. Williams (born 1951), American TV actor and comedian
- Elmer Williams (born 1964), Puerto Rican Olympic long jumper
- Elmo Williams (1913–2015), American film and TV editor, producer, director and executive
- Elton Williams (footballer) (born 1973), Montserratian international footballer
- Emlyn Williams (1905–1987), Welsh actor and dramatist
- Emmitt Williams (born 1998), American basketball player
- Emory Williams (1911–2014), Chicago businessman
- Enda Williams (born 1985), Irish Gaelic footballer
- Envis Williams (born 1962), West Indian cricketer from Tobago
- Ephraim S. Williams (1802–1890), American politician
- Esther Williams (1921–2013), American movie star and competitive swimmer
- Evelyn Williams (politician), American politician in New Jersey
- Evelyn Williams (artist) (1929–2012), British artist
- Ezra Williams (born 1980), American basketball player

== F ==
- Faith M. Williams (1893–1958), American economist
- Fara Williams (born 1984), English footballer
- Fenton Williams, American production designer and video director
- Finty Williams (born 1972), English actress
- Floyd Williams (born 1939), American mathematician
- Fos Williams (1922–2001), Australian rules footballer and coach from South Australia
- Foy Williams (born 1973), Jamaican-born Canadian Olympic sprinter
- Franklin Williams (diplomat) (1917–1990), lawyer and civil rights leader in the United States
- Franklin Delano Williams (1947–1993), American gospel music singer
- Frederica Williams (born 1958), American health care executive
- Freeman Williams (1956–2022), American basketball player

== G ==
- G. Mennen Williams (1911–1988), American politician
- Gabriel I. H. Williams, Liberian journalist
- Gail Williams, American director of The WELL
- Gale R. Williams (1922–2007), American politician
- Galmo Williams, Turks and Caicos Islander politician
- Gardner F. Williams (1842–1922), American mining engineer and author
- Garrett Williams (born 2001), American football player
- Garth Williams (1912–1996), American artist
- Geisha Williams (born 1961/62), American businesswoman
- Gemara Williams (born 1983), American and Canadian football player
- Genelle Williams (born 1984), Canadian actress
- Gentry Williams (born 2004), American football player
- Geoffrey Williams (born 1963), English singer-songwriter
- Georgia Williams (born 1993), New Zealand racing cyclist
- Geraint Williams (born 1962), Welsh footballer and manager
- Germaine Williams (born 1974), Jamaican-American rapper and actor better known as Canibus
- Gerry Williams (footballer) (1877–1901), Australian footballer
- Gilly Williams (1719–1805), English official, wit and letter writer
- Ginger Williams (singer) (born 1953), Jamaican-born British singer
- Glanmor Williams (1920–2005), Welsh historian
- Glyn Williams (footballer) (1918–2011), Welsh footballer
- Glyndwr Williams (1932–2022), professor of history at Queen Mary, University of London
- Glynn Williams (born 1939), British sculptor
- Grace Williams (1906–1977), Welsh composer
- Greedy Williams (born 1997), American football player
- Gregg Williams (born 1958), American football coach
- Greta Williams (1869–1964), English opera singer
- Griff Williams (painter) (born 1966), American artist
- Guinn Williams (Texas politician) (1871–1948), American state senator and congressman from Texas
- Guinn "Big Boy" Williams (1899–1962), American actor
- Gwendoline Williams (1922–2013), British novelist
- Gwilym Williams (1913–1990), Anglican Archbishop of Wales 1971–1982
- Gwyn Williams (rugby), Welsh rugby player
- Gwyn A. Williams (1925–1995), Welsh historian
- Gwyn Williams (football manager), Leeds United's technical director and manager
- Gwyneth Williams (born 1953), controller of BBC Radio 4
- Gwynfor Williams (born 1956), Welsh rugby footballer
- Gwynne Williams (born 1937), Welsh poet and translator

== H ==
- H. R. Williams, American writer
- Hajj-Malik Williams (born 1999), American football player
- Hal Williams (born 1938), American actor
- Hardy Williams (1931–2010), American politician
- Harland Williams (born 1962), Canadian-American comedian, actor, and radio personality
- Harper Williams (born 1971), American basketball player
- Hartley Williams (1843–1929), Australian judge
- Hartley Williams (clergyman) (1844–1927), Anglican priest in South Australia
- Harwood Williams (born 1970), Kittitian cricketer
- Hayward Williams (born 1981), American singer-songwriter
- Heathcote Williams (1941–2017), English poet, actor and dramatist
- Heathcote Williams (cricket administrator) (1859–1931), New Zealand cricket administrator
- Helema Williams (born 1991), Cook Islander Olympic sailor
- Henria Leech Williams (1867–1911), British suffragette
- Henrik Williams, Swedish historian and linguist
- Hershel W. Williams (1923–2022), US Marine; Medal of Honor recipient
- Hilda May Williams (1899–1972), American nurse
- Hillary Williams (born 1988), American grappler and Brazilian jiu–jitsu practitioner
- Hiram D. Williams (1917–2003), painter and University of Florida professor
- Hiram Smith Williams (1833–1921), American politician and Confederate soldier
- Horace Williams (1900–1960), Welsh professional footballer and manager
- Horatio Burt Williams (1877–1955), American electrophysiologist
- Horton Williams (1933–2020), Australian judge
- Hosea Williams (1926–2000), American civil rights leader
- Hugo Williams (born 1942), British poet, journalist and travel writer
- Hywel Williams (born 1953), Welsh politician and Plaid Cymru MP

== I ==
- Idris Williams (1836–1894), Welsh Liberal politician
- Ieuan Williams (1909–1964), Welsh cricketer
- Ieuan Rhys Williams (1909–1973), Welsh actor
- Ifor Williams (1881–1965), Welsh scholar of Old Welsh
- Ike Williams (1923–1994), American boxer
- Illtyd Williams (fl. 1930s), Welsh rugby league footballer
- Iñaki Williams (born 1994), Spanish footballer
- Iolo Williams (born 1962), Welsh nature observer and TV presenter
- Iris Williams (1946–2025), Welsh singer
- Irv Williams (1919–2019), American jazz saxophonist and composer
- Isadora Williams (born 1996), American-Brazilian Olympic figure skater
- Isiah Williams (born 1987), American football quarterback, known as Juice Williams
- Isiah Williams (basketball), American basketball player
- Iva Williams, American politician
- Ivor Williams (1908–1982), Welsh artist
- Ivory Williams (born 1985), American sprinter
- Ivy Williams (1877–1966), English lawyer; first woman to be called to the bar
- Izaac Williams (born 1989), New Zealand basketball player

== J ==
- J. Williams (singer) (born 1986), New Zealand R&B singer
- J. Williams (cinematographer) (1948–2005), Indian cinematographer in Malayalam movies
- J. Allen Williams (born 1960), American animator
- J. D. Williams (born 1978), American actor
- J. Mark G. Williams, British psychologist
- J. Terry Williams (1930–2015), American film editor
- Jabara Williams (born 1989), American football player
- Jabo Williams (c.1895–1953 or 1954), American boogie-woogie and blues pianist and songwriter
- Jackson Williams (born 1986), American baseball player
- Jacob Williams (born 1991), American wheelchair basketball player
- JaCorey Williams (born 1994), American basketball player
- Jacques Williams (born 1981), English footballer
- Jacquian Williams (born 1988), American football player
- Jade Williams (born 1988), British pop singer
- Jalen Williams (born 2001), American basketball player
- Jamaal Williams (born 1995), American football player
- Jamal Williams (born 1976), American football player
- Jamar Williams (born 1984), American football player
- Jamel Williams (born 1973), American football player
- Jamye Coleman Williams (1918–2022), American social activist
- Jan Williams (born 1939), American musician, conductor and composer
- Jan-Michael Williams (born 1984), Trinidadian footballer and coach
- Janice Savin Williams, Jamaican-born American businesswoman
- JaQuitta Williams, American TV journalist
- Jarrett Williams (born 1984), American comic book creator
- Jarvis Williams (wide receiver) (born 1987), American football player
- Javarris Williams (born 1986), American football player
- Javonte Williams (born 2000), American football player
- Jawad Williams (born 1983), American basketball player and coach
- Jayden Williams (born 2003), American football player
- Jean Williams, British sports historian and author
- Jean E. Williams (1876–1965), British composer
- Jenni Williams (born 1962), Zimbabwean human rights activist
- Jeral Wayne Williams, birth name of Dr Mutulu Shakur (1950–2023); American activist, murderer, and stepfather of Tupac Shakur
- Jermaine Williams (American football) (born 1973), American football player
- Jermaine Williams (born 1982), American actor and dancer
- Jerrol Williams (1967–2025), American football player
- Jessica Williams (actress) (born 1989), American actress and comedian
- Jessica Williams (musician) (1948–2022), American pianist and composer
- Jett Williams (born 1953), American singer and songwriter
- Jett Williams (baseball) (born 2003), American baseball player
- Jewell Williams (born 1957), American politician
- Jillian Williams (born 1997), American sitting volleyball player
- Joan C. Williams (born 1952), American psychologist and academic
- Jodie Williams (born 1993), British sprinter
- Joejuan Williams (born 1997), American football player
- Jonas Williams (born 2008), American football player
- Jontez Williams, American football player
- Josiah B. Williams (1810–1883), American politician
- Joss Williams, special effects supervisor
- Juan Williams (born 1954), Panamanian–born American journalist
- Jules Williams (born 1968), British writer, director and producer
- Julia Williams (abolitionist) (1811–1870), American abolitionist
- Julian Williams (American football) (born 1990), American football player
- Julian Williams (boxer) (born 1990), American boxer
- Julius Penson Williams (born 1954), American composer and conductor
- Julius Williams (born 1986), American football player
- Jumaane Williams (born 1976), American activist and politician
- Junior Williams (footballer) (born 1987), Grenadian international footballer
- Junior Williams (cricketer) (born 1950), Jamaican cricketer

== K ==
- Kaa Williams, New Zealand TV presenter
- Kamiko Williams (born 1991), American basketball player and coach
- Karl Williams (born 1971), American football player
- Karlos Williams (born 1993), American football player
- Karyn Williams (born 1979), American Christian musician
- Kasen Williams (born 1992), American football player
- Kat Williams (1967–2025), American blues singer
- Kath Williams (1895–1975), Australian women's activist
- Katharine Williams (judge), Australian judge
- Kathryn Williams (born 1974), English singer-songwriter
- Katie Williams (footballer) (born 1984), Welsh international footballer
- Katt Williams (born 1971), American comedian, actor, rapper and singer
- Kayla Williams (author) (born 1976), U.S. Army linguist
- Kayla Williams (gymnast) (born 1993), American gymnast
- Keiland Williams (born 1986), American football player
- Keith Daniel Williams (1947–1996), American rapist and triple murderer
- Keller Williams (born 1970), American musician
- Kelvin Williams (born 1959), Trinidad and Tobago cricketer and national coach
- Kenroy Williams (1984–2024), Barbadian cricketer for the West Indies
- Keron Williams (born 1984), Jamaican-born player of Canadian football
- Kerwynn Williams (born 1991), American football player
- Ke'Shawn Williams (born 2001), American football player
- Keston Williams (born 1988), Trinidad and Tobago international footballer
- Kid Williams (1893–1963), American boxer
- Kiely Williams (born 1986), American singer, dancer, and actress
- Kingsley O. Harrop-Williams (1947–2019), Guyanese-born poet, author, and civil engineer
- Kip Williams, Australian theatre and opera director and writer
- Kipling Williams, American psychologist
- Kirk Williams Jr. (born 1986), American basketball player
- Kirsty Williams (born 1971), Welsh politician
- Kirsty Williams (drama), British radio drama director and producer
- Kiyan Williams (born 1991), American visual artist
- Korey Williams (born 1987), American football player
- Korto Reeves Williams, Liberian women's activist
- Kristian Williams (born 1974), American anarchist author
- Kristian Williams (American football) (born 2000), American football player
- K'Waun Williams (born 1991), American football player
- Kylie Williams (Miss Florida) (born 1983), American beauty queen
- Kyren Williams (born 2000), American football player

== L ==
- Lamanzer Williams (born 1974), American football defensive end
- Lance Williams (graphics researcher) (1949–2017), American graphics researcher
- Lance Williams (basketball) (born 1980), American basketball player
- LaQuan Williams (born 1988), American football wide receiver
- Laron Williams (1948–1985), American serial killer
- Latavious Williams (born 1989), American basketball player
- LaToy Williams (born 1988), Bahamian sprinter
- Latoya Williams (born 1987), American basketball player
- Lauryn Williams (born 1983), American sprinter and bobsledder
- Layton Williams (born 1994), English stage and TV actor
- Leighton Williams (born 1977), Welsh chess master
- Leila Williams (born 1937), British TV host, model, and beauty pageant titleholder
- Lenae Williams (born 1979), American basketball player
- Leona Williams (born 1943), American country music singer
- Leonardo Williams, American politician
- Leroy Williams (1937–2022), American jazz drummer
- Lester Williams (musician) (1920–1990), American blues guitarist, singer and songwriter
- Lester Williams (American football) (1959–2017), American football player
- Levi Williams (1794–1860), Illinois militia member and Baptist minister
- Levron Williams (born 1979), American football player
- Lew Williams (1934–2019), American singer and songwriter
- Lia Williams (born 1964), English actress
- Lincoln Williams (born 1993), Australian volleyball player
- Lindon Williams (1932–1989), American politician
- Lionel Williams (born 1937), Barbadian cricketer
- Lionel Williams (TV presenter) (1928–2016), Australian television personality
- Lizaad Williams (born 1993), South African cricketer
- Llŷr Williams (born 1976), Welsh pianist
- Llywelyn Williams (1911–1965), Welsh politician
- Lon Williams (1890–1978), American author, teacher and lawyer
- Lona Williams (born 1966), American TV producer, writer, and actress
- Lontrell Williams (born 1999), American rapper known as Pooh Shiesty
- Loris Elaine Williams (1949–2005), Australian archivist and activist
- Lorraine Williams, American businesswoman
- Lorraine A. Williams (1923–1996), American educator
- Lottie Williams (actress, born 1866) (1866–1929), American actress, singer, and dancer
- Lottie Williams (actress, born 1874) (1874–1962), American character actress
- Lucinda Williams (born 1953), American singer and songwriter
- Lucinda Williams (athlete) (born 1937), American sprinter
- Lukyn Williams (1853–1943), Christian author
- Lydia Williams (born 1988), Australian soccer player
- Lyle Williams (1942–2008), American politician
- Lynda Williams (born 1958), Canadian author

== M ==
- Madden Williams (born 2007), American football player
- Madeleine Williams (born 1983), Canadian cross-country skier
- Madi Williams (born 1999), American basketball player
- Madieu Williams (born 1981), Sierra Leonean-born American football player
- Maggie Williams (born 1954), American management consultant and campaign manager for Hillary Clinton
- Maisie Williams (born 1997), English actress
- Maiya Williams (born 1962), American author, TV producer, and screenwriter
- Maizie Williams (born 1951), Montserratian-born British model, dancer, and singer
- Malinda Williams (born 1970), American actress and producer
- Malique Williams (born 1988), Antiguan swimmer
- Mandisa Williams (born 1984), South African rugby union player
- Marco Williams, American documentary filmmaker and professor
- Margot Williams (botanist), American botanist
- Margot Williams, American investigative journalist and research editor
- Maria Jane Williams (1795–1873), Welsh musician and folklorist
- Maria P. Williams (1866–1932), American newspaper editor, film producer, author, and scriptwriter
- Marianne Williams (1793–1879), British pioneering educator in New Zealand
- Marilyn Taylor Williams (1954–2009), American politician
- Mario Williams (born 1985), American football player
- Mario Williams (wide receiver) (born 2003), American football player
- Marion Williams (1927–1994), American gospel singer
- Marion Vernese Williams, Barbadian economist, banker, accountant, and diplomat
- Marjorie Williams (1958–2005), American writer, reporter, and columnist
- Marjorie Williams (astronomer) (1900–1983), American astronomer and professor
- Marley Williams (born 1993), Australian rules footballer
- Marmaduke Williams (1774–1850), American politician
- Marquez Williams (born 1994), American football player
- Marquice Williams (born 1985), American football coach
- Marquise Williams (born 1992), American football player
- Marshall Williams (born 1989), Canadian actor and model
- Marty Williams (born 1951), American politician
- Matilda Alice Williams (1875–1973), New Zealand Methodist deaconess
- Maxx Williams (born 1994), American football player
- Medwyn Williams, Welsh vegetable gardener
- Mekeil Williams (born 1990), Trinidadian footballer
- Melanie Williams (born 1964), British singer
- Mentor Williams (1946–2016), American songwriter and producer
- Mercy Williams (1947–2014), Indian teacher and politician
- Meritzer Williams (born 1989), Saint Kitts and Nevis sprinter
- Merriwether Williams (born 1968), American television writer, executive, and voice actor
- Meshak Williams (born 1991), American football player
- Mikaylah Williams (born 2005), American basketball player
- Milt Williams (born 1945), American basketball player
- Milton Williams (born 1999), American football player
- Mo Williams (born 1982), American basketball player and coach
- Moe Williams (born 1974), American football player
- Molly Williams (fl.1818), American firefighter
- Mona Williams (writer, born 1905) (1905–1991), American novelist and poet
- Mona Williams (writer, born 1943) (born 1943), Guyanese-New Zealand children's author, memoirist, storyteller, and educator
- Montel Williams (born 1956), American television host and actor
- Monty Williams (born 1971), American basketball player, coach, and executive
- Murray Williams (born 1982), New Zealand rugby union footballer
- Mutryce Williams, Kittian civil servant, activist, and political ambassador
- Mykel Williams (born 2004), American football player
- Myrna Williams (politician) (1929–2021), American politician
- Myron B. Williams (c.1817–1884), American politician and lawyer

== N ==
- N. D. Williams (born 1942), Guyanese writer
- Nairobi Williams, Jamaican-born, dancehall toaster and reggae vocalist better known as Lady Levi
- Nancy Williams (born 1959), New Zealand cricketer
- Nancy I. Williams, American kinesiologist and professor
- Nansi Williams (1922–1966), Welsh heroine in the Aberfan disaster
- Naomi Williams (figure skater) (born 2006), South Korean-born American figure skater
- Nardus Williams, British singer
- Nat Williams (born 1956), American law enforcement officer
- Natalie Williams (born 1970), American basketball player and executive
- Natasha Williams (actress) (born 1971), Jamaican actress
- Natashia Williams (born 1978), American actress, model, and singer
- Neco Williams (born 2001), Welsh footballer
- Nell Williams (born 1998), English actress
- Nell Hall Williams (1933–2021), American quilter
- Nelly Williams (born 1980), West Indian cricketer from Trinidad and Tobago
- Neville Williams (born c.1940), elder of the Wiradjuri nation in Western New South Wales
- Nia Williams (born 1990), American soccer player
- Niall Williams (writer) (born 1958), Irish author
- Nicko Williams (born 1989), Grenadian footballer
- Nikema Williams (born 1978), American politician
- Nikki Williams (born 1988), South African singer-songwriter
- Nohl Williams (born 2002), American football player
- Norma Williams (1928–2017), New Zealand swimmer
- Novlene Williams-Mills (born 1982), Jamaican track and field athlete
- Nushawn Williams (born 1976), American sex offender

== O ==
- Olajide Williams (born 1988), Nigerian footballer
- Olajide Williams (scientist) (born 1969), American neurologist and professor
- Oliver Williams (American football) (born 1960), American football player
- Oliver Williams (cricketer) (born 1983), English cricketer
- Olivia Williams (born 1968), English actress
- Olly Williams, British artist working as one half of Olly and Suzi
- O'Neill Williams (born 1943), American angler and TV presenter
- Oren Williams (born 1992), American actor
- Orrin J. Williams (1844–1913), American politician and businessman
- Orrin T. Williams (1845–1928), American judge, lawyer, and politician
- Oritsé Williams (born 1986), English singer-songwriter
- Osbert Edwin Williams Jr. (1875–1917), pioneer aviator and engineer
- Oshor Williams (born 1958), English footballer
- Otha Williams, American politician
- Otis Williams (born 1941), American singer

== P ==
- Palmer Williams Jr. (born 1965), American actor
- Pamela Williams, American jazz saxophonist, songwriter, producer and artist
- Parker Williams (1873–1958), Welsh–born Canadian politician
- Peggy R. Williams, US/Canadian college president
- Pendarvis Williams (born 1991), American basketball player
- Penny Williams (1937–2018), American politician in Oklahoma
- Percy Williams (sprinter) (1908–1982), Canadian athlete
- Percy G. Williams (1857–1923), American vaudeville performer and vaudeville theater owner/manager
- Pernal Williams (born 1991), St Lucian international footballer
- Peyton Williams (born 1998), American basketball player
- Pharrell Williams (born 1973), American singer/rapper/producer
- Pierre Williams (born 1975), British murderer
- Pip Williams (author), Australian author, writer of The Dictionary of Lost Words (2020)
- P. J. Williams (born 1993), American football player
- P. J. Williams (offensive lineman) (born 2004), American football player
- Pointer Williams (born 1974), American basketball player
- Porsha Williams (born 1981), American TV personality, model and singer
- Poto Williams (born 1961/62), New Zealand politician
- Preston Williams (born 1997), American football player

== Q ==
- Quentin Williams (1983–2023), American politician
- Quincy Williams (born 1996), American football player
- Quinnen Williams (born 1997), American football player

== R ==
- R. J. Williams (born 1978), American actor, TV host and producer
- R. Seth Williams (born 1967), American attorney
- Rachel Williams (model) (born 1967), American model
- Rachel Williams (footballer) (born 1988), English international footballer
- Rachel DeLoache Williams, American writer
- Raequan Williams (born 1997), American football player
- Section 8 (record producer) Rai'shaun Williams, American record producer and songwriter
- Randa Williams (born 1962), American heiress
- Randal Williams (born 1978), American football player
- Randy Williams (born 1953), American long jumper
- Randy Williams (baseball) (born 1975), American baseball player
- Raynell Williams (born 1989), American Olympic boxer
- Rebecca Williams (actress) (born 1988), British actress
- Rebecca Chase Williams, American journalist and city mayor
- Rebekah Williams (1950–2023), Canadian politician in Nunavut
- Redaric Williams (born 1981), American actor
- Reece Williams (born 1985), Australian rugby league player
- Rees Williams (1900–1963), Welsh footballer
- Reid Williams, American TV and film director and producer
- Renauld Williams (born 1981), US Canadian football linebacker
- Reva Williams, American astrophysicist
- Rheinallt Nantlais Williams (1911–1993), Welsh professor of Philosophy of Religion
- Rhoda Williams (1930–2006), American actress
- Rhonda Louise Williams (1957–2019), American social worker and survivor of Dean Corll
- Rhodri Williams (born 1968), Welsh sports journalist
- Rhodri Williams (rugby union) (born 1993), Welsh rugby union international
- Rhydwen Williams (1916–1997), Welsh poet, novelist, editor, minister and television presenter
- Ricardo Williams (cricketer) (born 1968), English cricketer
- Ricardo Williams (athlete) (born 1976), Jamaican Olympic athlete
- Rickey Williams Jr. (born 1975/1976), American mayor
- Rip Williams (1882–1933), American baseball player
- Riquna Williams (born 1990), American basketball player
- Rita Williams (born 1976), American basketball player
- Robina Williams, English author
- Robyn Williams (born 1944), British–born Australian science journalist and broadcaster
- Robley C. Williams (1908–1995), American biophysicist
- Rodarius Williams (born 1996), American football player
- Roderick Williams, opera singer (born 1965), English operatic baritone and composer
- Rodric Williams, British solicitor
- Rodwell Williams (born 1956), Belizean lawyer
- Roland Williams (born 1975), American football tight end
- Roley Williams (1927–1999), Welsh footballer
- Rollin Williams (1922–2012), American social work educator
- Rolston Williams (born 1965), Antiguan and Barbudan football player and manager
- Romario Williams (born 1994), Jamaican footballer
- Ronwen Williams (born 1992), South African footballer
- Roosevelt Williams (1903–1996), American blues pianist
- Roosevelt Williams (gridiron football) (born 1978), American football cornerback
- Roshumba Williams (born 1968), American model
- Ross Williams (computer scientist) (born 1962), Australian computer scientist and entrepreneur
- Roydell Williams (born 1981), American football player
- Rozz Williams (1963–1998), American rock vocalist
- Rubin Williams (born 1976), American boxer
- Ruby Williams, American folk artist
- Rudy Williams (saxophonist) (1919–1954), American jazz saxophonist
- Rudy Williams (footballer) (born 1965), Honduran footballer
- Rushbrook Williams (1890–1978), British historian and civil servant

== S ==
- Sabra Williams, British actress and TV presenter
- Sammie Williams, American trombonist and bandleader known as Big Sam (musician)
- Sammy Williams (1948–2018), American actor
- Sammy Williams (American football) (born 1974), American football offensive lineman
- Sascha Williams (born 1980), British journalist and news reader
- Saul Williams (born 1972), American singer, musician, poet, writer and actor
- Savion Williams (born 2001), American football player
- Scooby Williams (born 2003), American football player
- Scot Williams (born 1972), English actor, writer and producer
- Seante Williams (born 1991), American football player
- Serena Williams (born 1981), American professional tennis player and sister of Venus Williams
- Shad Williams (born 1971), American baseball pitcher
- Shammond Williams (born 1975), American-born Georgian basketball player
- Shanice Williams (born 1993), Turks and Caicos Islands beauty pageant titleholder
- Shanthi Williams (born 1958), Indian actress
- Sharon A. Williams, Canadian lawyer and legal scholar
- Sharrie Williams (born 1965), American singer-songwriter
- Shaud Williams (born 1980), American football player and coach
- Shawne Williams (born 1986), US pro basketball player
- Sheanon Williams (born 1990), American soccer player
- Sheila Williams (born 1956), American editor of Asimov's Science Fiction
- Shelden Williams (born 1983), US pro basketball player
- Shellene Williams (born 1981), Jamaican track and field sprinter
- Shericka Williams (born 1985), Jamaican Olympic sprinter
- Shermaine Williams (born 1990), Jamaican hurdler
- Sherman Williams (boxer) (born 1972), Bahamian boxer
- Sherman Williams (American football) (born 1973), American football running back
- Shirley Williams (1930–2021), Baroness Williams of Crosby, United Kingdom politician
- Shomari Williams (born 1985), Canadian football defensive end
- Silas Williams (1888–1944), American football player and coach
- Silas J. Williams (died 1908), American politician from Ohio
- Siobhan Williams, English–Canadian actress
- Siraj Williams (born 1984), Liberian Olympic sprinter
- Sly Williams (born 1958), American basketball player
- Sonia Williams (born 1979), Antiguan sprinter
- Sonny Bill Williams (born 1985), New Zealand rugby league and rugby union player
- Sophie Williams (born 1991), British fencer
- Stepfret Williams (born 1973), American football player
- Stephanie Williams (dancer), Australian ballet dancer
- Stephanie Williams (Miss District of Columbia) (born 1987), Miss District of Columbia, 2010
- Stephon Williams (born 1993), American ice hockey goaltender
- Stevenson A. Williams (1851–1932), American politician and businessman
- Stevie Williams (born 1979), American professional skateboarder
- Stewart Williams (rugby league) (born c.1958), English rugby league footballer
- Stokley Williams (born 1967), American singer and musician
- Sunita Williams (born 1965), American astronaut
- Suzanne Williams, American politician
- Sylvester Williams (American football) (born 1988), American football player
- Sylvia Williams (1936–1996), American museum director, curator and art historian

== T ==
- T. J. Williams (American football) (born 1982), American football tight end
- Tacarra Williams, American comedian
- Taleah Williams (born 1997), American Paralympic athlete
- Taliesin Williams (1787–1847), Welsh poet and author
- Talcott Williams (1849–1928), American journalist and educator
- Tamati Williams (born 1984), New Zealand footballer and fashion model
- Tameka Williams (born 1989), St Kitts and Nevis sprinter
- Tamika Williams (born 1980), American basketball player and coach
- Tammy Williams (born 1987), American softball player
- Tank Williams (born 1980), American football player
- Tara Williams (born 1974), American basketball player
- Tarvis Williams (born 1978), American basketball player
- Tasha Williams (athlete) (born 1973), New Zealand Olympic hammer thrower
- Taylor John Williams (born June, 1991), American singer-songwriter
- Taylor Williams (born July, 1991), American baseball pitcher
- Tedd Williams (born 1969), American mixed martial arts fighter
- Teddy Williams (American football) (born 1988), American football cornerback
- Teran Williams (born 1984), Antiguan international footballer
- Terrell Williams (born 1974), American football player and coach
- Tex Williams (1917–1985), American musician
- Thelda Williams (1941–2023), American politician
- Theodore J. Williams (1923–2013), American engineer
- Theresa Williams (born 1956), American writer
- Tiffany Williams (born 1983), American hurdler
- Timmy Williams (born 1981), American actor
- Tip Williams (1900–1974), Welsh cricketer
- Toby Williams (American football) (born 1959), American football player
- Toccara Williams, American basketball player
- Tod Williams (filmmaker) (born 1968), film director and screenwriter
- Toni Williams (1939–2016), New Zealand pop singer
- Toni Williams (legal scholar), British legal academic at Cambridge University
- Tonya Lee Williams (born 1958), Canadian actress
- Torri Williams (born 1986), American football player
- Tourek Williams (born 1991), American football player
- Trae Williams (born 1985), American football player
- Tramon Williams (born 1983), American football player
- Trayveon Williams (born 1997), American football player
- Tre Williams, American singer
- Trent Williams (born 1988), American football player
- Trevardo Williams (born 1990), American football player
- Trevion Williams (born 2000), American basketball player
- Trey Williams (born 1992), American football player
- Trill Williams (born 1999), American football player
- Troy Williams (born 1994), American football player
- Trudi Williams (born 1953), Florida politician
- True Williams (1839–1897), American illustrator
- Tucky Williams, American actress
- Ty Williams (actor) (born 1966), American actor
- Ty Williams (born 1980), Australian rugby league footballer
- Tyleik Williams (born 2003), American football player
- Tylen Jacob Williams (born 2001), American actor
- Tyler James Williams (born 1992), American rapper and actor
- Tyrel Jackson Williams (born 1997), American actor
- Tyrone Williams (wide receiver) (born 1970), American football player
- Tyrone Williams (defensive tackle) (born 1972), American football player
- Tyrone Williams (cornerback) (born 1973), American football player
- Ty'Son Williams (born 1996), American football player

== U ==
- Ulis Williams (born 1941), American Olympic sprinter

== V ==
- Vanessa Williams (born 1963), American singer, actress, and fashion designer
- Vanessa Estelle Williams (born 1963), American actress
- Vanessa R. Williams (born 1960), American gospel singer, began recording in the 2000s
- Vasili Robertovich Williams (1863–1939), Russian and Soviet soil scientist
- Venetia Williams (born 1960), British jockey and racehorse trainer
- Venus Williams (born 1980), pro tennis player and sister of Serena Williams
- Vera Williams (1927–2015), American children's writer and illustrator
- Vern Williams (1930–2006), American bluegrass singer and musician
- Vern S. Williams (born 1949), American teacher and National Advisor on Mathematics
- Vesta Williams (1957–2011), American singer-songwriter, also recorded as Vesta
- Vicki Williams (born 1956), American wrestler
- Victor Williams (Canadian Army officer) (1867–1949), Canadian general and Commissioner of the Ontario Provincial Police
- Victor Williams (born 1970), American actor
- Vin Williams (1932–1974), Australian rules footballer
- Virgil Williams, American TV writer and producer
- Vogue Williams (born 1986), Irish model and TV and radio personality

== W ==
- Waldo Williams (1904–1971), Welsh poet
- Wallace Williams (runner), American long-distance runner
- Wallace Williams (politician) (died 1974), American politician from Maryland
- Wayne Williams (born 1958), American murderer
- Wesley Williams (born 1968), Canadian rapper and actor known as Maestro Fresh Wes
- Whit Williams, American saxophonist
- Whitney Williams, American businesswoman and philanthropist
- Willi Williams (born c.1956), Jamaican reggae and dub musician and producer
- Woody Williams (infielder) (1912–1995), American baseball player
- Worrell Williams (born 1986), American football linebacker
- Wydett Williams Jr. (born 2003), American football safety
- Wyn Williams (born 1951), Welsh justice of the High Court

== Y ==
- Yorick Williams (born 1975), British basketball player
- Yvette Williams (1929–2019), New Zealand field athlete

== Z ==
- Zac Williams (Australian footballer) (born 1994), Australian rules footballer
- Zach Williams (musician) (born 1981), American solo artist
- Zack Williams (American football) (born 1988), American football center
- Zane Williams (born 1977), American country singer
- Zelda Williams (born 1989), American actress
- Ziaire Williams (born 2001), American basketball player
- Zoe Williams (writer) (born 1973), English columnist, journalist and author
- Zoe Williams (Gladiators) (born 1980), English TV 'Gladiator' Amazon
- Zoey Williams, Canadian commercial pilot
- Zwelibanzi Moyo Williams (born 1977), Zimbabwean-American chef and restauranteur

== Fictional characters ==
- Abigail Williams, from the American soap opera As the World Turns
- Andy Williams, a character in the Jaws movie franchise
- Anna Williams, from the Tekken video game series
- Ash Williams, from the Evil Dead franchise
- Ashley Williams, in the Mass Effect video game
- Becky Williams, a character in the musical drama show Empire
- Ben Williams, in the British soap opera Family Affairs
- Betty Williams, in the British soap opera Coronation Street
- Billy Williams, in Coronation Street; married to Betty Williams
- Brad Williams, from British soap opera EastEnders
- Byron Williams, in the 1996 film Mars Attacks!
- Chrissie Williams, on Holby City
- Christine Williams, on Tangle'
- Christine Blair, née Christine Williams, fictional character on The Young and the Restless
- Cindy Beale, a fictional character in the British soap opera EastEnders
- Cindy Williams, from British soap opera EastEnders
- Conrad Williams, in British soap opera Family Affairs
- Dave Williams, on the TV series Desperate Housewives
- Doug Williams, on the soap opera Days of our Lives, played by Bill Hayes
- Edie Williams, from Desperate Housewives
- Gethin Williams minor character from the BBC soap opera Eastenders
- Henry Williams, from the BBC television drama Casualty
- Jane Williams, from British soap opera EastEnders
- Kenny Bruce Williams, in the Left Behind series
- Malcolm Williams, from the animated series Fireman Sam
- Makena Williams, American Girl character
- Mark Williams, in Holby City
- Mary Williams, from the American soap opera The Young and the Restless
- Michael Williams, in William Shakespeare's Henry V
- Michael Williams, from the soap opera Neighbours
- Mitch Williams, in the soap opera General Hospital
- Natasha Williams, from the Australian soap opera Neighbours
- Nathan Williams, from the British soap opera EastEnders
- Nina Williams, from the Tekken video game series
- Norton Williams, in the video game Bully
- Patty Williams, fictional character from the American CBS soap opera The Young and the Restless
- Paul Williams, on The Young and the Restless
- Reggie Williams, in sitcom Small Wonder
- Rhys Williams, from the British science fiction series Torchwood
- Ricky Williams, from The Young and the Restless
- Rory Williams, from Doctor Who
- Sierra Williams, a character in the Canadian TV series Catwalk
- Shelley Williams, from the British soap opera Emmerdale
- Smash Williams, in the television series Friday Night Lights
- Terry Williams, on the British soap opera Hollyoaks
- Tim Williams, on the TV series Tangle
- Winston Williams, in the Netflix series 13 Reasons Why

Ellie williams (the Last of us games and tv sho)
