= Cecil Williams =

Cecil Williams may refer to:

- Cecil Williams (anti-apartheid activist) (1909–1979), English-South African theatre director and anti-apartheid activist
- Cecil Williams (cricketer) (1926–1998), Barbadian cricketer and diplomat
- Cecil Williams (pastor) (1929–2024), pastor, community leader and author
- Cecil J. Williams (born 1937), American photographer, publisher and author
- Cecil Williams (soccer), Australian soccer player
- Cecil Williams (basketball) (born 1995), American player
