= Dennis Williams =

Dennis Williams may refer to:

- Dennis Williams (basketball) (born 1965), American basketball player
- Dennis Williams (cricketer) (1936–2013) English cricketer and British Army officer
- Dennis Williams (ice hockey) (born 1979), Canadian ice hockey coach
- Dennis Williams (unionist) (born 1953), American labor union leader
- Dennis A. Williams (born 1952), former New Zealand rugby league international
- Dennis E. Williams (born 1959), Delaware state representative from the 10th district
- Dennis P. Williams (born 1953), 55th Mayor of Wilmington

== See also ==
- Denis Williams (1923–1998), Guyanese painter, author, and archaeologist
- Denis John Williams (1908–1990), Welsh neurologist and epileptologist
