= Basil Williams =

Basil Williams is the name of:

- Basil Williams (cricketer) (1949–2015), former West Indian cricketer
- Basil Williams (figure skater) (1891–1951), British single skater and pair skater
- Basil Williams (historian) (1867–1950), English historian

== See also ==
- List of people with surname Williams
