= Marvin Williams (disambiguation) =

Marvin Williams may refer to:

- Marvin Williams (born 1986), American basketball player
- Marvin Williams (basketball, born 1993), American basketball player
- Marvin Williams (American football) (born 1963), retired American football player
- Marvin Williams (footballer) (born 1987), English football (soccer) player
- Marvin Williams (baseball) (1920–2000), Negro league baseball player
- Marvin Williams (politician), program manager for the United States Commission on the Social Status of Black Men and Boys

== See also ==
- Martin Williams (disambiguation)
- William Marvin (1808–1902), American judge and Governor of Florida
