= Dudley Williams =

Dudley Williams may refer to:

- Dudley Williams (judge) (1889–1963), Australian judge
- Dudley Williams (MP) (1908–1987), later Rolf Dudley-Williams, British aeronautical engineer and Conservative Party politician
- Dudley Williams (physicist) (1912–2004), American physicist
- Dudley Williams (public servant) (1909–1985), Australian public servant, Secretary of the Department of Shipping and Transport
- Dudley Williams (biochemist) (1937–2010), British scientist
- Dudley Williams (dancer) (1938–2015), American modern dancer

== See also ==
- Dudley-Williams baronets
