= Leo Williams =

Leo Williams may refer to:

- Leo Williams (musician) (born 1959), British-Jamaican bass guitarist
- Leo Williams (athlete) (born 1960), American high jumper
- Leo Williams (rugby union) (1941–2009), Australian rugby union official
- Leo Williams (cricketer) (1900–1984), English cricketer
- Leonardo Williams, Mayor of Durham, North Carolina

== See also ==
- Leonard Williams (disambiguation)
