= Carroll Williams (disambiguation) =

Carroll Williams (1916–1991) was an American entomologist.

Carroll Williams may also refer to:

- Carroll Williams (Canadian football), American player of gridiron football
- Carroll B. Williams Jr. (1929–2024), American research forester and entomologist
