= Jordan Williams =

Jordan Williams may refer to:

- Jordan Williams (basketball, born 1990), American basketball player
- Jordan Williams (basketball, born 1995), British basketball player
- Jordan Williams (cyclist), cyclist who races for Madison Saracen
- Jordan Williams (footballer, born 1992), English footballer
- Jordan Williams (footballer, born 1999), English footballer
- Jordan Williams (linebacker, born 1993), American football linebacker who played in National Football League for five seasons
- Jordan Williams (linebacker, born 1994), Canadian football linebacker
- Jordan Williams (linebacker, born 1997), American football linebacker
- Jordan Williams (defensive lineman) (born 1999), American football defensive lineman
- Jordan Williams (rugby union) (born 1993), Welsh rugby union player
- Jordan Williams (rugby league) (born 1997), English rugby league player
- Jordan Williams (fighter), American mixed martial artist
- Jordan Williams (New Zealand lawyer), co-founder of the New Zealand Taxpayers' Union
- MJ Williams, also known as Jordan Williams, Welsh footballer

== See also ==
- Jordan (name)
- Jordan–Williams House, Nolensville, Tennessee
- Jordan Williamsz (born 1992), Australian middle-distance runner
- List of people with surname Williams
