= Rupert Williams =

Rupert Williams may refer to:

- Rupert Crawshay-Williams (1908–1977), music critic, teacher, writer, and philosopher
- Rupert Gregson-Williams (born 1966), English composer, conductor, and music producer
- Rupert James Williams (1877–1970) Australian Methodist minister
