= Barbara Williams =

Barbara Williams may refer to:

- Barbara Williams (actress) (born 1953), Canadian-born American actress
- Barbara Williams (skating coach), American ice hockey skating coach
- Barbara Roles Williams (born 1941), American former figure skater
- Barbara A. Williams, African-American radio astrophysicist
- Barbara Williams (writer) (1925 – 2013), American author of children's books
- Barbara Williams (fencer) (born 1949), Scottish fencer
