= Barney Williams =

Barney Williams may refer to:

- Barney Williams (actor) (1824–1876), Irish-American star comedian in New York City
- Barney Williams (boxer) (1891–1949), American light heavyweight champion a/k/a Battling Levinsky
- Barney Williams (songwriter) (1931–2009), American record producer and singer a/k/a Luther Dixon
- Barney Williams (rower) (born 1977), Canadian Olympic medalist

== See also ==
- Bernard Williams (disambiguation)
