= Nigel Williams =

Nigel Williams may refer to:

== Sports ==
- Nigel Williams (footballer) (born 1954), English former professional footballer
- Nigel Williams (Canadian football) (born 1971), Canadian football player
- Nigel Williams (karate), represented Bermuda at the 1995 Pan American Games
- Nigel Williams (rugby union), Welsh rugby union referee in 2004–05 Heineken Cup

== Others ==
- Nigel Williams (author) (born 1948), British novelist, screenwriter and playwright
- Nigel Williams (broadcaster), British broadcaster and voice over artist
- Nigel Williams (conservator) (1944–1992), British conservator and restorer
- Nigel Williams (children's rights activist), Northern Ireland Commissioner for Children and Young People (2003–2006)
- Nigel Christopher Ransome Williams, Ambassador from the United Kingdom to Denmark
- Nigel Shawn Williams, Canadian actor and theatre director
- Nigel Williams (priest) (born 1963), Welsh Anglican clergyman
- Nigel Williams (politician), Welsh politician

== See also ==
- Nigel Williams-Goss (born 1994), American basketball player
