= Ruth Williams =

Ruth Williams may refer to:

- Ruth Williams (baseball) (1926–2005), baseball pitcher
- Ruth J. Williams (born 1955), Australian-American mathematician
- Ruth Williams (badminton) (born 1989), Jamaican badminton player
- Ruth C. Williams (1897–1962), Australian writer for children
- Ruth Margaret Williams, British mathematician
- Ruth Cupp (1928–2016), née Williams, American lawyer and legislator
- Ruth Williams Khama (1923–2002), First Lady of Botswana from 1966 to 1980
- Ruth Williams-Simpson (born 1949), Jamaican sprinter
- Ruth Williams, character in 1940 American film noir Babies for Sale

== See also ==
- Linda Ruth Williams (born 1961), professor of film studies
