= Ty Williams (actor) =

American film and television actor (born 1966)

- Born: December 24, 1966 (age 59); Saginaw, Michigan, United States
- Years active: 1998–Present

Ty Williams (born December 24, 1966) is an American film and television actor. He was born in Saginaw, Michigan.

Williams is an actor, stuntman, producer, and miscellaneous crew member. He debuted in Dawn of Our Nation in 2001.

== Filmography ==
- Mission: Impossible III (2006) (uncredited) - Thug
- The Shield (2005) (TV series) - Bad Cop (1 episode)
- Clubhouse (2004) (TV series) - Marino (1 episode)
- Starship Troopers 2: Hero of the Federation (2004) (V) (uncredited) - Trooper
- Dawn of Our Nation (2001) (TV) - Sgt. Burt Cooper
- Naked Wishes (2000) - Bartender
- The Brian Benben Show (2000) (TV series) - Ted (2 episodes)
- Blue Streak (1999) (uncredited) - Armer car driver
- The General's Daughter (1999) (uncredited) - West point officer
- Ally McBeal (1999) (TV series) - Attorney (1 episode)
- The Practice (1998) (TV series) - Bailiff (1 episode)
