= Amy Williams (disambiguation) =

Amy Williams (born 1982) is a retired skeleton racer.

Amy Williams may also refer to:

- Amy Williams (composer) (born 1969)
- Amy Williams (rugby union) (born 1986), New Zealand rugby union player
- Amy Williams (tennis) (1872–1969), American tennis player
- Amy Williams (basketball) (born 1976), American basketball coach
- Amy Williams (Neighbours) (active since 1988), fictional character from the Australian soap opera Neighbours
- Amy Pond (active since 2010), married name Amy Williams, character in Doctor Who
- Amy Williams (weightlifter) (born 1992), Great Britain weightlifter
- Amy Williams (bowls), Welsh indoor bowler

== See also ==
- Amy Bess Miller (1912–2003, born Williams), American historian
