= Carl Williams =

Carl Williams may refer to:

- Carl M. Williams (born 1942), Michigan legislator
- Carl S. Williams (1872–1960), American football player, coach, and ophthalmologist, head football coach at the University of Pennsylvania from 1902 to 1907
- Carl Williams (boxer) (1959–2013), a.k.a. Carl "The Truth" Williams, American boxer
- Carl Williams (criminal) (1970–2010), convicted Australian criminal
- Carl Williams (racing driver) (1930–1973), American racecar driver
- Carl Williams (sailor) (born 1981), New Zealand sailor
- Carl Joe Williams (born 1970), American visual artist

== See also ==
- Karl Williams (born 1971), American former football player
- Karl Williams (rugby union), New Zealand rugby player
