= Stan Williams =

Stanley or Stan Williams may refer to:

== Sports ==
- Stan Williams (American football) (1929–2015), American football player
- Stan Williams (Australian footballer) (1891–1966), Australian rules footballer
- Stan Williams (baseball) (1936–2021), American baseball player
- Stan Williams (soccer, born 1919) (1919–2007), South African association football player
- Stanley Williams (rugby union, born 1886) (1886–1936), Wales-born England international rugby union player
- Stan Williams (rugby union) (1914–1967), Wales international rugby union player
- Stan Williams (speedway rider) (1917–2002), English speedway rider

== Others ==
- Stanley Miller Williams (1930–2015), American poet, translator and editor
- Stanley Thomas Williams (1888–1956), American literary critic and scholar of Herman Melville.
- Stanley Williams (1953–2005), founder of American gang The Crips
- Stanley Williams (dancer) (1925–1997), 20th century dancer and instructor
- R. Stanley Williams (born 1951), HP Labs scientist
