= Victoria Williams (disambiguation) =

Victoria Williams (born 1958) is an American singer/songwriter and musician.

Victoria Williams may also refer to:

== Sportspeople ==
- Victoria Williams (badminton) (born 1995), badminton player from England
- Victoria Williams (footballer)
- Victoria Williams (swimmer), participated in Swimming at the 1988 Summer Paralympics
- Victoria Williams (water polo), represented United States at the 2013 Summer Universiade

== Others ==
- Victoria Williams (actress) (born 1956), British actress
- Kirsty Williams (Victoria Kirstyn Williams), Welsh politician
- Victoria McCloud, UK judge, who practiced law under the maiden name Victoria Williams

== See also ==
- Vicki Williams (born 1956), wrestler
