= Glen Williams =

Glen(n) Williams may refer to:

== People ==
- Glen Morgan Williams (1920–2012), United States federal judge
- Glen Williams (basketball) (1954–2017), American basketball player
- Glenn Williams (born 1977), baseball player from Australia
- Glenn Williams (sound engineer), American sound engineer

== Places ==
- Glen Williams, Ontario, a hamlet in Ontario, Canada
