= R. J. Williams (Methodist) =

Rupert James Williams (1877 – 19 March 1970) was a Methodist minister in New South Wales.

== History ==
Williams was born in Sydney

He was trained at Newington Theological Institution and in 1910 stationed at Cessnock, followed by Harden 1911–1912 and briefly at Newrybar before being called to the Central Methodist Mission (CMM), where he was stationed 1913–1916 as assistant to (in turn) superintendents P. J. Stephen and S. J. Hoban. He held the pulpit at Montague Street, Balmain in 1917, in which year he was elected president of the New South Wales Christian Endeavour Union, then Balmain central 1918–1920, when he was superintendent of the Balmain Methodist Mission, and 1922–1925 in Wollongong, where he was greatly loved, and called back to lead that church's anniversary celebrations in 1932.

He was minister of the Armidale church 1926–1928 and Mosman 1929–1930. During this period he demonstrated his administrative abilities as successively chairman of the South Coast district, and chairman and financial secretary of the Armidale synod.

In September 1930 he succeeded Rev H. C. Foreman as Superintendent of Sydney's Central Methodist Ministry, at the Lyceum mission, 1931–1938, to be replaced by Frank H. Rayward. While ministering there, he became a close friend of H. M. Hawkins, Minister for Labour, and conducted his funeral service at St Andrew's Cathedral in June 1939.
