= Claude Williams =

Claude Williams may refer to:

- Candy Williams (Claude Williams, 1929–1983), Aboriginal Australian musician, actor, and activist, father of basketball player Claude Williams
- Claude Williams (basketball, born 1952), Aboriginal Australian basketball coach
- Claude Williams (basketball, born 1965), American basketball player
- Claude Williams (musician) (1908–2004), American jazz musician
- Claude Williams (politician) (born 1955), Canadian politician
- Claude Williams (rugby union) (1916–1998), New Zealand rugby union player
- Claude A. Williams, Adjutant General of Virginia, United States
- Claude C. Williams (1895–1979), American Presbyterian minister and civil rights/labor activist
- Lefty Williams (Claude Preston Williams, 1893–1959), American Major League Baseball player

== See also ==
- Claude Williamson (1926–2016), American jazz pianist
