= Oscar Williams =

Oscar Williams may refer to:

- Oscar Williams (poet) (1900–1964), American anthologist and poet
- Oscar Williams (filmmaker) (1944–c. 2023), film actor, screenwriter and film director
- Oscar Williams (cricketer) (born 1932), Antiguan cricketer

== See also ==
- Oscar Randal-Williams, British mathematician
