= Marilyn Taylor Williams =

American politician

Marilyn Taylor Williams (August 12, 1954 - September 9, 2009) was an American Democratic politician from Wappapello, Missouri, who served in the Missouri House of Representatives.

Born in Dexter, Missouri, she attended Dexter public schools, Three Rivers Community College, and Southwest Baptist University. Williams was a restaurant owner. She died of cancer in 2009.
