= Clifford Williams =

Clifford or Cliff Williams may refer to:

- Cliff Williams (rugby union, born 1898) (1898–1930), Welsh international rugby union hooker
- Clifford Williams (politician) (1905–1987), Welsh Member of Parliament
- Clifford Williams (actor) (1926–2005), Welsh theatre director and stage actor
- Clifford Williams, American victim of wrongful conviction, see Hubert Nathan Myers and Clifford Williams
- Cliff Williams (rugby, born 1939) (1939–2014), rugby league footballer of the 1970s for Wales, and Hunslet
- Clifford Williams (philosopher) (born 1943), American author and philosopher
- Cliff Williams (basketball) (born 1945), American basketball player
- Cliff Williams (born 1949), English bassist for Australian band AC/DC
- Cliff Williams (bowls), Welsh lawn and indoor bowler
