= Melvin Williams =

Melvin Williams may refer to:

- Melvin Williams (admiral) (born 1955), American naval officer
- Melvin Williams (actor) (1941–2015), American actor
- Melvin Williams (American football) (born 1979), American football player
- Melvin Williams (musician) (born 1953), American gospel musician
