= Trevor Williams =

Trevor Williams may refer to:

== Sports ==
- Trevor Williams (baseball) (born 1992), American baseball player
- Trevor C. Williams (born 1965), Canadian basketball player and coach
- Trevor Williams (American football) (born 1993), American football player
- Trevor Williams (footballer) (fl. 1902–1907), English footballer
- Trevor Williams (rugby union), Welsh rugby union player

== Music ==
- Trevor Williams (violinist) (1929–2007), British violinist

== Other ==
- Sir Trevor Williams, 1st Baronet (1623–1692), Welsh politician, landowner, military commander and rebel
- Trevor Williams (bishop) (born 1948), former Bishop of Limerick and Killaloe
- Trevor Williams (plant geneticist) (1938–2015), British plant geneticist
- Trevor Williams (designer) (1931–2008), British film and television production designer
- Trevor Illtyd Williams (1921–1996), British scientist and historian
