= Sid Williams (disambiguation) =

Sid Williams (born 1942) is a former American football linebacker and diplomat.

Sid, Syd, Sidney or Sydney Williams may also refer to:

- Sidney Williams (author) (born 1962), American author
- Sidney Williams (baseball) (1914–2006), American baseball pitcher
- Sid E. Williams (1928–2012), American chiropractor and founder of Life University
- Sid Williams (footballer) (1919–2003), English association footballer for Bristol City from 1937 to 1952
- Sid Williams (rugby league), Australian rugby footballer who played in the 1960s and 1979s
- Syd Williams (1918–1976), Welsh rugby union and rugby league footballer
- Sid Williams Theatre is the major performance theatre in the Comox Valley, Courtenay, British Columbia, Canada

== See also ==
- Sid Williams Richardson (1891–1959), American businessman and philanthropist
- Sidney Williamson, New Zealand singer, conductor and singing teacher
