= Nicole Williams =

Nicole, or Nicola Williams may refer to:

- Nicola Williams (barrister), English Crown Court Judge since 2009
- Nicole A. Williams (born 1977), American Democratic legislator in Maryland
- Nicola Williams (soccer) (born 1982), Australian coach and former player
- Nicole Williams (roller derby) (born 1983), American champion skater, a/k/a Bonnie Thunders
- Nicole Williams English (born 1983), Canadian model and fashion designer, maiden name Nicole Williams
- Nicole Williams, a fictional character in the animated TV series Craig of the Creek
