= Lloyd Williams =

Lloyd Williams may refer to:

- Lloyd Williams (businessman) (born 1940), Australian businessman and thoroughbred racehorse owner
- Lloyd Williams (footballer) (born 1934), Australian footballer for Collingwood
- Lloyd Williams (Welsh cricketer) (1925–2007), Welsh cricketer
- Lloyd Williams (Jamaican cricketer) (born 1939), Jamaican cricketer
- Lloyd Williams (filmmaker) (born 1940), American filmmaker
- Lloyd Williams (rugby union, born 1933) (1933–2017), Welsh international rugby union player
- Lloyd Williams (rugby union, born 1989), Welsh international rugby union scrum-half
- Lloyd A. Williams (1945–2025), American community leader
- Lloyd W. Williams (1887–1918), American World War I Marine officer
- J. Lloyd Williams (1854–1945), Welsh botanist, author, and musician
- Lloyd Williams (singer), Jamaican reggae singer of the 1960s
- William Lloyd Garrison Williams (1888–1976), Canadian-American Quaker mathematician
