= Arnold Williams =

Arnold Williams may refer to:

- Arnold Williams (American politician) (1898–1970), governor of Idaho
- Arnold Williams (British politician) (1890–1958), British businessman and Liberal politician
- Arnold Williams (cricketer) (1870–1929), Welsh-born cricketer for New Zealand
