= Brett Williams =

Brett Williams may refer to:

- Brett Williams (offensive lineman) (born 1980), American football player
- Brett Williams (defensive lineman) (born 1958), Canadian football player
- Brett Williams (defensive end) (born 1973), former defensive end for the Los Angeles Xtreme
- Brett Williams (footballer, born 1968), English footballer
- Brett Williams (footballer, born 1987), English footballer
- Brett T. Williams, U.S. Air Force officer and cybersecurity expert
- Brett Williams (Australian cricketer) (born 1967), Australian cricketer
- Brett Williams (New Zealand cricketer) (born 1965), New Zealand cricketer
