= Simon Williams =

Simon Williams may refer to:

- Simon Williams (actor) (born 1946), English actor best known for playing James Bellamy in Upstairs, Downstairs
- Simon Williams (shot putter) (born 1967), English shot put and discus athlete
- Simon Williams (sociologist) (born 1961), professor of sociology at the University of Warwick
- Simon Williams (bassist) (born 1973), bassist and backup singer to ska-punk band Goldfinger
- Simon Williams (chess player) (born 1979), English chess player, grandmaster
- Simon Williams (cricketer) (born 1970), former English cricketer
- Simon Williams (Royal Navy officer) (born 1960), British Royal Navy officer
- Simon Channing Williams (1945–2009), British film producer
- Simon Williams (artist) (born 1973), Welsh comic artist
- Simon Williams (weightlifter) (1919–2000), Jamaican Olympic weightlifter
- Simon Williams, the real name of Marvel Comics superhero Wonder Man
