= Rowland Williams =

Rowland Williams may refer to:

- Rowland Williams (priest) (1779–1854), Welsh Anglican clergyman and father of the theologian of the same name
- Rowland Williams (theologian) (1817–1870), Welsh theologian and academic at St David's College, Lampeter
- Rowland Williams (Hwfa Môn) (1823–1905), Welsh Congregationalist cleric, poet and Archdruid
- Rowland Powell-Williams (1872–1951), English cricketer, was born as Rowland Williams but changed his name in 1900

== See also ==
- Roland Williams (born 1975), American football player
- Roland Vaughan Williams (1838–1916), English lawyer and judge
