= Lon Williams =

American author

Lon Thomas Williams (March 17, 1890 – June 1978) was an American western author, teacher, and lawyer who lived in Andersonville, Tennessee, United States. He is best known for writing a large number of classical and weird western stories for the pulp magazines, especially Western Action and Real Western Stories. He also wrote a number of books, including Hill Hoyden, Hill Hellion, and Shack Baby.

Williams' most popular series were the Judge Steele stories (combining the western genre with the legal drama) and the Deputy Marshal Lee Winters stories (Weird Westerns).
