= Chester Williams (disambiguation) =

Chester Williams (1970–2019) was a South African rugby union rugby player.

Chester Williams may also refer to:

- Chester Williams (baseball) (1906–1952), American Negro league baseball player
- Chester Williams (police officer) (born 1973), Commissioner of Belize
- Chester Sidney Williams (1907–1992), American educator and author
