= Linda Williams =

Linda Williams may refer to:

- Linda Williams, American folk singer in duo Robin and Linda Williams
- Linda Williams (singer) (born 1955), Dutch singer
- Linda Williams (film scholar) (1946–2025), American professor of film studies
- Linda M. Williams (born c. 1949), American sociologist and criminologist
- Linda Ruth Williams (born 1961), British film studies academic
- Linda Hunt Williams (born 1948), American politician in the North Carolina House of Representatives
