= Desmond Williams =

Desmond Williams may refer to:

- Desmond Williams (musician), American electronica musician and record producer
- Desmond Williams (architect) (1932–2026), British architect
- Desmond Williams (bishop) (1930–2006), Irish Roman Catholic bishop
- Desmond Williams (boxer) (born 1967), Sierra Leonean boxer
- Desmond Rex Williams (born 1933), English snooker and billiards player
- Thomas Desmond Williams (1921–1987), Irish historian

== See also ==
- Des Williams (1928–2011), South African boxer
