= Morgan Williams =

Morgan Williams may refer to:

- Morgan B. Williams (1831–1903), member of the U.S. House of Representatives from Pennsylvania
- Morgan Williams (ecologist) (born 1943), former Parliamentary Commissioner for the Environment in New Zealand
- Morgan Williams (politician) (1878–1970), New Zealand Member of Parliament
- Morgan Williams (rugby union, born 1976), Canadian rugby union player
- Morgan Williams (rugby union, born 1995), Welsh rugby union player
- Morgan Williams (footballer, born 1999), English footballer
- Morgan Williams (footballer, born 2004), Welsh footballer

See also

- Morgan William (born 1996), American women's basketball player
