= Van Williams (disambiguation) =

Van Williams (1934–2016) was an American actor.

Van Williams may also refer to:

- Van Williams (American football) (born 1959), American football running back
- Van Williams (drummer) (born 1966), American drummer
- Van Zandt Williams, American physicist
