= Melissa Williams =

Melissa Williams may refer to:

- Melissa Williams (political scientist), American academic who specialises in democratic theory and comparative political theory
- Melissa Williams (historian), New Zealand academic who specialises in history and indigenous studies
- Melissa L. Williams (born 1987), American actress and model
- Melissa Williams (skateboarder) (born 1985), South African skateboarder
