= Luke Williams =

Luke Williams may refer to:

- Luke Williams (wrestler) (born 1947), New Zealand professional wrestler
- Luke Williams (author) (born 1977), Scottish author
- Luke Williams (cricketer) (born 1979), Australian cricketer
- Luke Williams (Australian rules footballer) (born 1979), Australian footballer
- Luke Williams (footballer, born 1981), English football player and manager
- Luke Williams (footballer, born 1993), English footballer
- Luke Williams (baseball) (born 1996), American baseball player
- Luke Williams, drummer for Dead Letter Circus
- Luke Williams (journalist), Australian journalist and author
