= Darren Williams (disambiguation) =

Darren Williams (born 1977) is an English footballer.

Darren Williams may also refer to:

- Darren Williams (author) (born 1967), Australian novelist
- Darren Williams (Australian footballer) (born 1960), Australian rules footballer with Essendon
- Darren Williams (cricketer) (born 1964), Dominican cricketer
- Dazzo Williams (born 1974), British boxer
- Darrin Williams, American politician from Arkansas
