= Mitch Williams (disambiguation) =

Mitch Williams may refer to:

- Mitch Williams (born 1964), American baseball player
- Mitch Williams (politician) (born 1953), South Australian Liberal politician and farmer
- Mitch Williams (General Hospital), a character in the soap opera General Hospital
