= Max Williams =

Max Williams may refer to:

- Max Williams (actor), Canadian film and television actor
- Max Williams (basketball) (1938–2025), American basketball player and general manager
- Max Williams (rugby union) (born 1998), Welsh rugby union player
- Max Williams (politician) (born 1963), American politician from Oregon

== See also ==
- Maxx Williams (born 1994), American football tight end
