= Scott Williams =

Scott Williams may refer to:

== Arts and entertainment ==
- Scott Williams (artist) (1956–2024), American stencil artist
- Scott Williams (comics) (born 1960), American comic book artist and inker
- Scott A. Williams, American television writer and producer

== Sports ==
- Scott Williams (American football coach) (fl. 1890s)
- Scott Williams (running back) (born 1962), American football player
- Scott Williams (figure skater) (born c. 1966), American figure skater
- Scott Williams (basketball) (born 1968), American basketball player
- Scott Williams (cricketer) (born 1971), Australian cricketer
- Scott Williams (field hockey) (born 1971), American field hockey defender
- Scott Williams (footballer) (born 1974), Welsh footballer
- Scott Williams (darts player) (born 1990), English darts player
- Scott Williams (rugby union) (born 1990), Welsh rugby union player

== Others ==
- Scott W. Williams (1943–2025), American mathematician
- Scott Williams (serial killer) (born 1963), American serial killer

== See also ==
- Scot Williams (born 1972), English actor and producer
