= Abraham Williams =

Abraham Williams may refer to:

- Abe Williams (born 1940), South African politician
- Abraham Williams Calderón (1894–1986), Honduran politician
- Abraham J. Williams (1781–1839), American politician, governor of Missouri
- Abraham Williams (reverend) (1727–1784), American preacher in Massachusetts
- Abraham Williams, husband of American politician Tulsi Gabbard

== See also ==
- A. V. Williams Jackson (1862–1937), American specialist on Indo-European languages
- Abram Williams (1832–1911), American businessman and U.S. senator from California
