= Kendall Williams (disambiguation) =

Kendall Williams (born 1991) is an American basketball player.

Kendal or Kendall Williams may refer to:

- Kendal Williams (born 1995), American sprinter
- Kendall Williams (baseball) (born 2000), American baseball pitcher
- Kendall Williams (American football) (born 1959), American football player
