= Rowan Williams (disambiguation) =

Rowan Williams (born 1950) is an Archbishop of Canterbury

Rowan Williams may also refer to:

- Rowan Williams (boxer) (born 1968), English boxer
- Rowan Anthony Williams (born 1968), English boxer
