= Micah Williams =

Micah Williams may refer to:

- Micah Williams (painter) (1782–1837), American painter
- Micah Stephen Williams (born 1991), American actor
- Micah Williams, birth name of comedian, Katt Williams (born 1971)
- Micah Williams (sprinter) (born 2001), American sprinter

== See also ==
- Micah Williams House
