= Aaron Williams =

Aaron Williams may refer to:

== Music ==
- Aaron Williams (composer) (1731–1776), British composer
- Aaron Williams (musician) (born 1942), British musician
- Aaron Williams (born 1993), American DJ better known as DJ A-Tron

== Sports ==
- Aaron Williams (basketball) (born 1971), American basketball player
- Aaron Pervis Williams (born 1991), American basketball player
- Aaron Williams (boxer) (born 1986), American boxer
- Aaron Williams (American football) (born 1990), cornerback
- Aaron Williams (footballer) (born 1993), English footballer

== Other ==
- Aaron Williams (cartoonist), American cartoonist
- Aaron Williams (ventriloquist), American ventriloquist
- Aaron Williams (writer), Canadian writer
- Aaron S. Williams, former director of the Peace Corps
