= Lisa Williams =

Lisa Williams may refer to:

- Lisa Williams (psychic) (born 1973), English claimed psychic and healer
- Lisa Williams (poet) (born 1966), American poet
- Lisa Williams (footballer) (born 1991), Australian rules footballer
