= Doc Williams =

Doc Williams may refer to:

- Doc Williams (racing driver) (1912–1982), American racecar driver
- Doc Williams (singer) (1914–2011), American country music band leader and vocalist
- Doc Williams (American football) (1899–1992), American football player
