= Gavin Williams =

Gavin Williams may refer to:

- Gavin Williams (sociologist) (born 1943), South African Africanist and sociologist
- Gavin Williams (rugby union) (born 1979), rugby union player from New Zealand, who plays for Samoa
- Gavin Williams (footballer) (born 1980), Welsh footballer
- Gavin Williams (cricketer) (born 1984), Antiguan cricketer
- Gavin Williams (baseball) (born 1999), American baseball pitcher

== See also ==
- Paul Gavin Williams (born 1968), bishop
