= Virginia Williams (disambiguation) =

Virginia Williams (born 1978) is an American actress.

Virginia Williams may also refer to:

- E. Virginia Williams (1914–1984), American professional ballet choreographer, teacher, and founder of the New England Civic Ballet
- Virginia Louise Williams (1915–1952), American swing and jazz vocalist
- Virginia Vassilevska Williams, American theoretical computer scientist
