= Seth Williams (disambiguation) =

Seth Williams may refer to:

- Seth Williams (1822–1866), American military officer
- Seth Williams (USMC) (1880–1963), American military officer who served as Quartermaster General of the U.S. Marine Corps
- Seth Williams (defensive back) (born 1986), American football defensive back
- Seth Williams (wide receiver) (born 2000), American football wide receiver
- R. Seth Williams (born 1967), Philadelphia District Attorney
