= Clarence Williams =

Clarence Williams may refer to:

== Sports ==
=== American football ===
- Clancy Williams (1942–1986), defensive back for Washington State University and Los Angeles Rams
- Clarence Williams (defensive end) (1946–2017), for Prairie View A&M and Green Bay Packers
- Clarence Williams (running back, born 1955) (1955–1994), football player for University of South Carolina, San Diego Chargers, Washington Redskins
- Clarence Williams (running back, born 1977), football player for University of Michigan and Arizona Cardinals
- Clarence "Pooh Bear" Williams (1975–2022), running back for Florida State University and Buffalo Bills
- Clarence Williams (tight end) (born 1969), for Washington State and Cleveland Browns; son of Clancy Williams

=== Other sports ===
- Clarence Williams (baseball) (1866–1934), American baseball player
- Clarrie Williams (1933–2017), English footballer

== Others ==
- Clarence Williams (musician) (1898–1965), American jazz pianist
- Clarence Williams (photojournalist) (born 1967), American photojournalist
- Clarence Williams III (1939–2021), American actor
- Clarence C. Williams (1869–1958), U.S. Army officer
- Clarence Stewart Williams (1863–1951), U.S. Navy admiral
