= Ursula Williams (disambiguation) =

Ursula Williams (1896–1979) was a British Liberal Party politician.

Ursula Williams may also refer to:

- Ursula Moray Williams (1911–2006), English children's author
- Ursula Vaughan Williams (1911–2007), English poet and author
