= Maurice Williams =

Maurice Williams may refer to:

- Mo Williams (Maurice Williams, born 1982), basketball player
- Maurice Williams (offensive tackle) (born 1979), American football player
- Maurice Williams (politician) (1926–2004), member of the Western Australian Legislative Assembly from the 1960s
- Maurice Williams (rugby league) (1942–2023), rugby league footballer of the 1960s
- Maurice Williams (wide receiver) (born 1987), American football player
- Maurice Williams (singer) (1938–2024), lead singer with Maurice Williams and the Zodiacs
- Maurice Williams, reporter for WHUR-FM who was killed in the 1977 Hanafi Muslim Siege

== See also ==
- Morris Williams (disambiguation)
