= Travis Williams =

Travis Williams may refer to:

- Travis Williams (basketball player) (born 1969), NBA player for the Charlotte Hornets
- Travis Williams (basketball coach) (born 1972), American college basketball coach
- Travis Williams (linebacker) (born 1983), National Football League linebacker for the Atlanta Falcons
- Travis Williams (running back) (1946–1991), National Football League kick returner for the Green Bay Packers
- Travis Williams (sports executive), American baseball and hockey executive
- Travis Williams (tailback) (1892–1986), National Football League running back for the Evansville Crimson Giants
- Travis Williams (sprinter) (born 2003), Jamaican sprinter

== See also ==
- Tarvis Williams (born 1978), American basketball player
