= Shane Williams (disambiguation) =

Shane Williams (born 1977) is a Welsh rugby union player.

Shane Williams may also refer to:

- Shane Williams (Australian footballer) (born 1959), Australian rules footballer
- Shane Williams (hurler), Irish hurler
