= Vern S. Williams =

Vern Williams
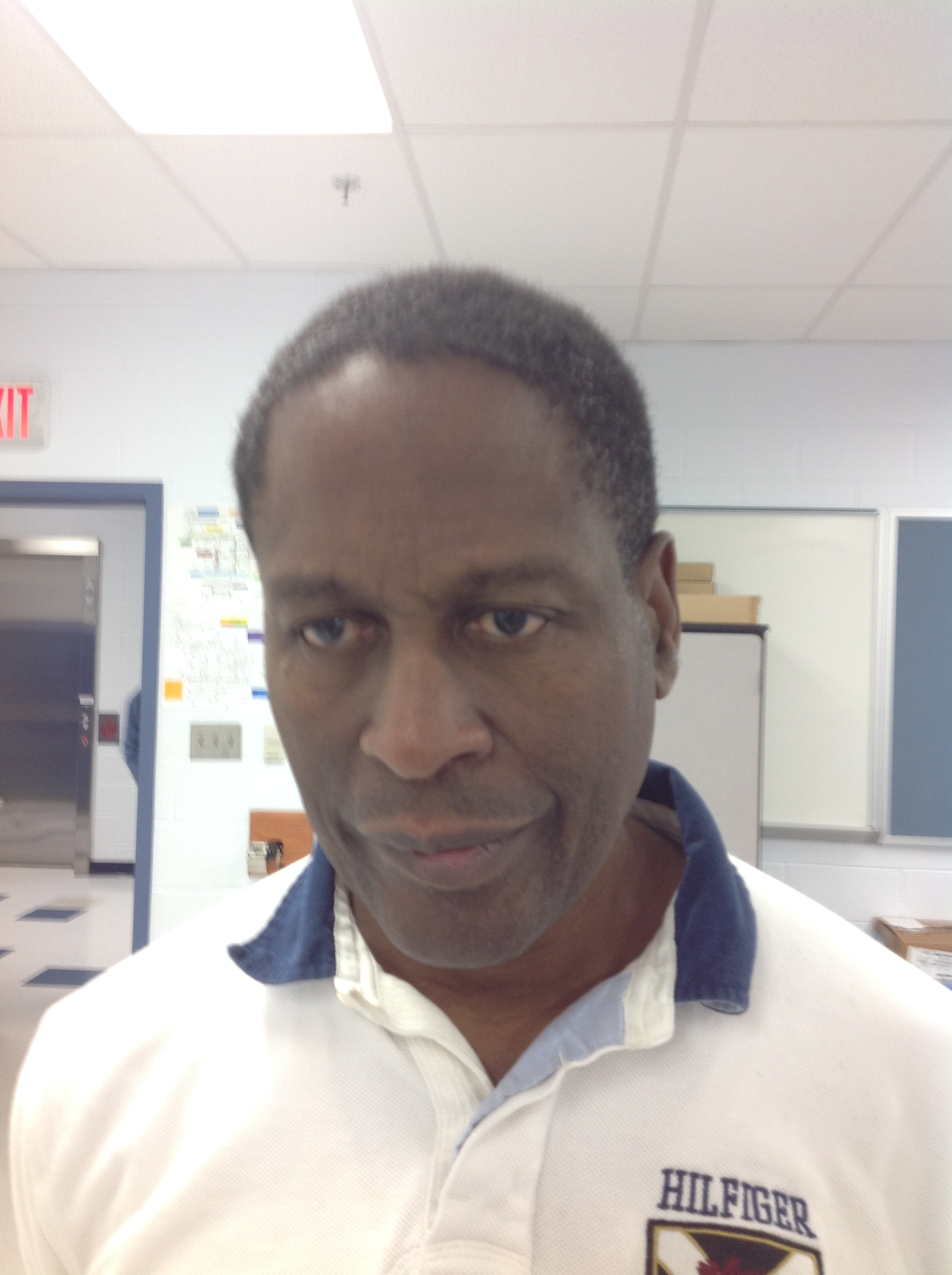
- Vern Williams at Longfellow Middle School in 2014
- Born: June 9, 1949 (age 77); Washington, D.C.
- Occupation: Math teacher at Nysmith School

Vern S. Williams is a mathematics teacher at Nysmith School in Herndon, Virginia. In 2007, Williams was one of 17 experts appointed by the George W. Bush administration to the National Mathematics Advisory Panel, and was the only member of the panel that was a practicing K-12 teacher. He decries the use of "fuzzy math" and believes that math textbooks have been "dumbed down" for students who dislike math.

== Biography ==
Williams was born on June 9, 1949, in Washington, D.C. He attended Paul Junior High School, Coolidge High School, and graduated from the University of Maryland in 1972 with a BS in math education. Williams first taught at Hayfield Secondary School in Alexandria, Virginia. He then taught for 7 years at Glasgow Middle School. Williams later transferred to Longfellow Middle School, then to BASIS Independent McLean in 2016. In 2021, he started to teach at Nysmith School as an upper school math teacher.

== Views on math ==
Williams is a strong believer in the eradication of "fuzzy math" and is a self-proclaimed teacher of "real math." He is strongly against math fads, which he believes "have taken the math out of mathematics and replaced it with calculators, watered down content and picture books." Williams also believes that teachers need free rein to create curriculums in order to teach successfully, and that "politicians, researchers, special interest groups, school system bureaucracies, [and] unions" shouldn't attempt to control what a teacher is allowed to teach. However, Williams receives some criticism for his more traditional views, and has been called an "anti-progressive" and a "radical" by some opponents.

== Achievements/Recognition ==
- Williams was one of 17 experts in the country appointed to the National Mathematics Advisory Panel by the Bush administration.
- He has been called by the Washington Post "one of the best math teachers in the country."
- Williams has received 2 national awards from the Mathematics Association of America for distinguished teaching.
- Williams coached the Longfellow MathCounts team for 14 years. Under his lead, the team earned awards at regional, state, and national levels of competition.
