= Chad Williams =

Chad Williams may refer to:

- Chad Williams (safety) (born 1979), American football safety
- Chad Williams (wide receiver) (born 1994), American football wide receiver
- Chad Williams (cricketer) (born 1995), Barbadian cricketer
- Chad Williams (murderer), perpetrator of the 2026 Twin Falls shooting
