= Emily Williams (disambiguation) =

Emily Williams (born 1984) is a New Zealand–born Australian singer–songwriter.

Emily Williams may also refer to:

- Emily Williams (architect) (1869–1942), American architect
- Emily Coddington Williams (1873–1952), American historian of mathematics, translator, novelist, playwright and biographer
