= Karen Williams =

Karen Williams may refer to

- Karen Williams (soprano), American concert and opera soprano
- Karen Williams (politician) (born 1950), former American politician and judge from Tennessee
- Karen J. Williams (1951–2013), Chief Judge of the United States Court of Appeals for the Fourth Circuit
- Karen Lynn Williams (born 1952), American writer of children's literature
- Karen L. Williams, American diplomat
- Karen M. Williams (born 1963), American federal judge in New Jersey
- Karen Hastie Williams (1944–2021), American lawyer and company director

== See also ==
- Karyn Williams (born 1979), American Christian musician
