= Isaac Williams =

Isaac Williams may refer to:

- Isaac Williams (writer) (1802–1865), British religious poet and prominent member of the Oxford Movement
- Isaac Williams Jr. (1777–1860), U.S. Representative from New York
- Isaac W. Williams, youth leader and activist
- Isaac Williams (rancher) (1799–1856), fur trapper, rancher in Southern California

== See also ==
- Ike Williams (1923–1994), American boxer
