= V. R. Williams =

Russian agronomist (1863–1939)

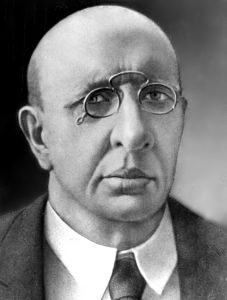

Vasili Robertovich Williams (Василий Робертович Вильямс; 9 October 1863 – 11 November 1939) was a Russian and Soviet soil scientist and agronomist. He was a professor of soil science at the Timiryazev Academy of Agriculture and was involved in advising the Soviet government on agricultural measures. He supported the protection of grassy meadows for soil conservation. Many of his ideas were based on untested theories but were adopted in the Stalinist era.

== Life and work ==
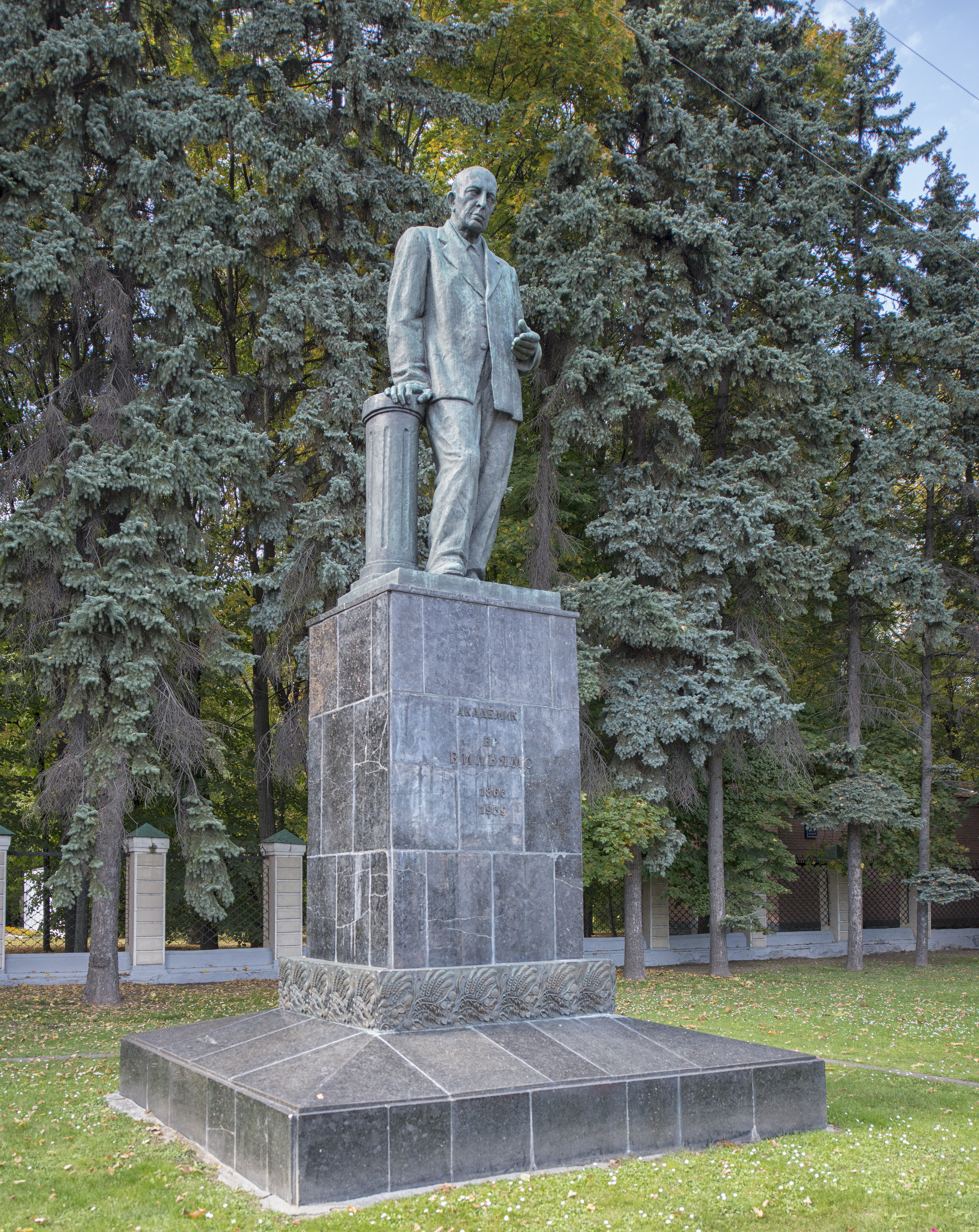
Statue of Williams at the Timiryazev Academy

Williams was born in Moscow, the son of an American engineer who had married settled in Russia. He was educated at the Petrovsky Academy and spent postgraduate studies in Paris with Louis Pasteur. He became a lecturer and then assistant professor of soils and agriculture. When the Timiriazev Academy of Agriculture was created he was made director. Williams was influenced by the views of Dokuchaev and became interested in the organic matter of soil. He introduced a doctrine of soil and soil formation and created a field that he called meadow science. He noted the importance of perennial grasses in soil fertility. He established what was called the Dokuchaev - Kostychev - Williams system of soil cultivation making use of the placement of meadows, fields, forests, shelterbelts and water bodies as key elements for agricultural landscaping. Williams clashed with soil scientists who worked purely on chemical analysis of soils. He promoted the growing of clover and grass in fodder meadows to both feed livestock and to protect soil. He helped develop a soil museum at the institute and wrote a book on "Soil Science" with several edition from 1914 to 1920. Williams has been considered as a founding figure of soil science in the Soviet Union. He received an Order of Lenin and was a member of the Soviet Academy of Sciences.

Williams used dialectical materialism to support his ideas and this was widely used to shut down criticism during the Stalin regime. Critics included D.N. Pryanishnikov, K.K. Gedroits, N.M. Tulaikov. Williams ideas were adopted as part of Stalin's great plan for the transformation of nature.
