= Hilda May Williams =

American nurse (1899–1972)

- Born: April 1, 1899; Chester, Connecticut
- Died: March 1, 1972 (aged 72); Hartford, Connecticut
- Education: Hartford Hospital School of Nursing
- Occupation: Registered nurse
- Employer: University of Connecticut

Hilda May Williams (April 1, 1899 – March 1, 1972) was an American nurse who served as nursing supervisor at the University of Connecticut infirmary in Storrs from 1931 to 1969.

== Biography ==
Williams was born in Chester, Connecticut, to parents Augustus and Clara H. Williams. Her father, employed as a steel grinder, was an American born in England, and her mother had emigrated from England in 1896. Williams was a registered nurse and a 1925 graduate of the Hartford Hospital School of Nursing. She began working at the hospital as a nurse in 1925 and had received a promotion to nurse supervisor by 1927.

She began her career at UConn in 1931 as a resident nurse for all students and employees. As enrollment grew, the first aid office became a fully fledged infirmary in 1947, with 44 inpatient beds for sick or injured students. Williams supervised operations. By 1958 she was supervising fifteen nurses in a re-envisioned University of Connecticut Student Health Service. She retired after nearly 39 years of service in 1969.

She was a member of Climax Chapter 98 of the Order of the Eastern Star, the Hartford Hospital School of Nursing Alumni Association, and Storrs Congregational Church of the United Church of Christ.

== Legacy ==
Williams died at Hartford Hospital on March 1, 1972, one month short of her 73rd birthday. She was survived by her sister and her two brothers. She never married and had no children.

Built in 1950 and expanded in 1970, UConn's Hilda May Williams Student Health Services Building on Glenbrook Road is named in her honor.
