= Marjorie Williams (astronomer) =

American astronomer (1900–1983)

Marjorie Williams (1900–1983) was an American astronomer who worked for many years as a professor at Smith College. Her research involved the observation of variable stars, and she served as president of the American Association of Variable Star Observers. She also wrote about a theory of Johannes Kepler according to which the Star of Bethlehem was a triple planetary conjunction.

== Early life and education ==
Williams was born on October 12, 1900, in Marshalltown, Iowa, where her father was a Quaker minister. After graduating from Guilford College, a Quaker college in North Carolina, she continued for graduate study at Smith College and the University of Michigan, where she earned a master's degree and doctorate respectively.

== Academic career ==
She joined the Smith College faculty in 1925 as an instructor, progressing through the faculty ranks over 28 years at Smith as assistant, associate, and full professor, chairman of the astronomy department, and director of the college's astronomical observatory. While still an assistant, she also became acting head of astronomy at Amherst College, and the only women on the Amherst College faculty. In summers, she performed astronomical research at the Maria Mitchell Observatory in Nantucket. She was president of the American Association of Variable Star Observers for the 1947–1948 term.

Williams retired from Smith in 1953. In 1959, she joined the National Science Foundation as Assistant Program Director for Astronomy.

== Later life and service ==
While still at Smith, Williams became active in Quaker efforts at war relief in Europe, through the American Friends Service Committee. In her retirement, she was active in the organization of the Washington, DC meeting of the Society of Friends. She also headed a retirement home and returned to Guilford to work as a dormitory resident and direct the student union.

She died on December 28, 1983.

== Recognition ==
Williams was elected as a Fellow of the American Association for the Advancement of Science in 1932.
