= Duncan Williams =

Duncan Williams may refer to:

- Duncan Williams (rugby union) (born 1986), Irish rugby union player
- Duncan Williams (newspaper executive), (born 1964), British news and sports publisher
- Duncan Ryūken Williams (born 1969), Soto Zen Buddhist priest
- Nicholas Duncan-Williams (born 1957), Archbishop of the Action Chapel International ministry
- Randa Williams (née Duncan; born 1962), heir to the Duncan family fortune, via Enterprise Products
