= Malcolm Williams =

Malcolm Williams may refer to:

- Malcolm Williams (American football) (born 1987), American football cornerback
- Malcolm Williams (Canadian football) (born 1993), Canadian football wide receiver
- Malcolm Williams (actor) (1870–1937), American stage actor
- Malcolm Williams (cricketer) (born 1949), Guyanese cricketer
- Malcolm Williams (Fireman Sam), fictional character from Fireman Sam
