= Barbara Williams (skating coach) =

American ice hockey skating coach

Barbara Williams is an American ice hockey skating coach.

Williams was born in Brooklyn, New York, and raised on Long Island. In 1977, she became the NHL's first female skating coach. Barbara Williams was named the official power skating instructor for the New York Islanders, becoming the first female skating coach in the National Hockey League and the first female coach in a men's sport on the national level. The Long Island native worked with the Islanders throughout their four consecutive Stanley Cup wins, then continued working with them after becoming the New Jersey Devils' skating coach. She also trained four NHL farm teams and more than 200 NHL players privately. A skater since the age of five, she's one of only a few women with her own hockey school. A 25-year resident of Kings Park, NY. In addition to teaching, she currently lectures on drug and alcohol abuse in schools.

Williams was inducted into the Suffolk Sports Hall of Fame on Long Island in the Hockey Category with the Class of 2011.

== Published works ==
- More Power to Your Skating (Macmillan, 1979; ISBN 0026290405)
