= Hugh Williams (disambiguation) =

Hugh Williams (1904–1969) was an English actor and dramatist.

Hugh Williams may also refer to:

- Sir Hugh Williams, 5th Baronet (died c. 1706) of Williams-Bulkeley baronets
- Hugh Williams (of Chester) (c. 1694–1742), member of parliament for Anglesey
- Sir Hugh Williams, 8th Baronet (c. 1716–1794), MP for Beaumaris
- Hugh Williams (priest) (1721/22–1779), Welsh priest and writer
- Hugh William Williams (1773–1829), Scottish landscape-painter known as "Grecian Williams"
- Sir Hugh Williams, 3rd Baronet (1802–1876)
- Hugh Williams (historian) (1843–1911), Welsh college tutor
- Hugh Pigot Williams (1858–1934), British naval officer
- Wilhelm Grosz (1894–1939), also known as Hugh Williams, Austrian composer, pianist, and conductor
- Hughie Williams (1933–2017), Australian trade unionist and Olympic wrestler
- Hugh Williams (judge) (born 1939), New Zealand judge
- Hugh C. Williams (born 1943), number theorist
- Hugh Martyn Williams (born 1946), commonly known as Hugh Williams, chartered accountant, author and Deputy National Treasurer of UKIP
- Hugh Bonneville (born 1963), English actor, born as Hugh Richard Bonniwell Williams
