= Adam Williams =

Adam Williams may refer to:

- Adam Williams (baseball) (fl. 1924), American baseball player
- Adam Williams (actor) (1922–2006), American actor
- Adam the Woo (David Adam Williams, 1974–2025), American YouTuber
- Adam Williams (basketball) (born 1983), basketball player
- Adam Williams (writer), American video game writer
- Adam Williams, character in the British TV series Cold Feet, played by James Nesbitt
