= Noel Williams =

Noel Williams may refer to:

- Noel Williams (South African politician), South African politician and anti-apartheid activist
- Noel Williams Jr. (born 1972), American politician and member of the Georgia House of Representatives
