= Kelly Williams (disambiguation) =

Kelly Williams is a Filipino-American basketball player.

Kelly Williams may also refer to:

- Kelli Williams, American actress
- Kellie Shanygne Williams, American actress
- Kelli Williams (musician), musician
- Kelly Williams Brown, American writer
- Kelly Williamson, American athlete
