= Lauren Williams =

Lauren Williams may refer to:

- Lauren Williams (footballer) (born 1994), American-born professional footballer for Saint Kitts and Nevis
- Lauren Williams (ice hockey) (born 1996), Canadian ice hockey player
- Lauren Williams (journalist), American journalist and former editor-in-chief of Vox
- Lauren Williams (mathematician), American mathematician at Harvard University
- Lauren Williams (taekwondo) (born 1999), British taekwondo athlete
- Lauryn Williams (born 1983), American sprinter and bobsledder
