= Colin Williams =

Colin Williams may refer to:

- Colin J. Williams (born c. 1941), American sociologist
- Colin H. Williams (1950–2026), British sociolinguist
- Colin Williams (priest) (born 1952), archdeacon of Lancaster, 1999–2005
- Colin Williams (producer), of Jim Henson's Pajanimals
- Colin Welland (1934–2015), British actor and screenwriter originally named Colin Williams
- Colin Williams, first vice-president of the Council for Aboriginal Rights in 1951
- Colin Williams, guitarist for British band His Majesty (founded 1983)
- Colin Williams, formerly director, Scotland, The Princess Royal Trust for Carers, recipient of 2006 New Year Honours

== See also ==
- Collin Williams (1961–2022), Zimbabwean cricketer
