= Duke Williams =

Duke Williams may refer to:

- Duke Williams (musician), American musician
- Duke Williams (safety) (born 1990), American football safety
- Duke Williams (wide receiver) (born 1993), American football wide receiver
