= Shannon Williams =

Shannon Williams is the name of:

- Shannon Areum Williams (born 1998), British-Korean singer known as Shannon
- Shannon Narun Williams, Australian hip-hop performer known as Brothablack
- Shannon Walker Williams, member of the now-defunct American R&B group Shades
- Shannon Tatlock (born 1984), Canadian curler born Shannon Williams
