= Marc Williams (disambiguation) =

Marc Williams (born 1988) is a Welsh footballer.

Marc Williams may also refer to:

- Marc Lloyd Williams (born 1973), Welsh footballer
- Marc Charles Williams (1955–2023), American jazz and rock saxophonist
