= Marlon Williams =

Marlon Williams may refer to:

- Marley Marl (born 1962), American DJ and producer
- Marlon Williams (athlete) (born 1956), Virgin Islands runner
- Marlon Williams (American musician), hip hop musician from Los Angeles
- Marlon Williams (New Zealand musician) (born 1990), New Zealand singer-songwriter and guitarist
  - Marlon Williams (album), 2016
- Marlon Williams (American football), American football wide receiver
