= Wade Williams =

Wade Williams may refer to:

- Wade Williams (born 1961) is an American actor.
- Wade Williams (born 1973), American politician
