= Patricia Williams (disambiguation) =

Patricia Williams may refer to:

- Patricia J. Williams (born 1951), American legal scholar
- Patti Williams (born 1955), American wrestler known as Precious (wrestling)
