= Dudley Williams (physicist) =

American physicist

- Born: April 12, 1912; Covington, Georgia USA
- Died: December 2, 2004 (age 92); Las Cruces, New Mexico USA
- Scientific career
- Fields: Physics; IR spectroscopy Radar

Francis Dudley Williams (April 12, 1912 – December 2, 2004) was an American physicist. He served as president of the Optical Society of America from 1976 to 1980.

== Biography ==
Williams was born to Ethel Turner and Arthur Dudley Williams in Covington, Georgia, on April 12, 1912. In 1927, he entered Oxford College of Emory University, at Oxford, Georgia. A family move prompted him to transfer to University of North Carolina at Chapel Hill, where he received an undergraduate degree in 1933. He pursued graduate studies at several institutions, but settled on UNC, where he received his MA in 1934 and his PhD in physics in 1936 for a thesis on IR spectroscopy.

In 1937, Williams married Loraine Decherd, a graduate physics student whom he met while teaching at the University of Texas in 1934. They had a son and a daughter. She died in 1988. He later married Marie Sovereign, who survived him.

Francis Dudley Williams died on December 2, 2004, at Mesilla Valley Hospice in Las Cruces, New Mexico. He was 92 years old.

== Professional career ==
In 1936, Williams was employed by the physics faculty at the University of Florida in Gainesville; he taught there until 1941. From 1941 through 1943, he participated in radar development at MIT’s Radiation Laboratory, then was moved to the Los Alamos Scientific Laboratory to work on the atomic bomb. The galvanometers he designed were used to measure the thermal radiation produced during the Trinity test in July 1945. He remained with Los Alamos until 1946.

In 1946, Williams joined Ohio State University, where he gained an international reputation in IR physics. He and another OSU physics professor (George Shortley) co-wrote an engineering-physics textbook that remained in print for 30 years. In 1963, Williams joined North Carolina State University as head of its physics department. In 1964, he accepted a position as Regents Distinguished Professor of Physics at Kansas State University in Manhattan, where he remained until his retirement in 1982.

While at KSU, Williams continued his research in IR spectroscopy of gases, liquids, and solids, and investigated transmission and reflection spectra. He also continued teaching and loved to do lecture demonstrations.

== Honors ==
- President of the Optical Society of American (1976–1980)
- Received Emory Medal in 2000 (awarded to notable Emory alumni)
- Named Fellow of John Simon Guggenheim Memorial Foundation in 1955
- Named Fellow of Oxford, United Kingdom (1956)
- Named Fellow of universities and institutions in Belgium and the Netherlands
- Named National Science Foundation's senior post-doctoral fellow at University for Astrophysics at the University of Liege in Belgium and at the National Physical Laboratory at Teddington in the United Kingdom (1961-1962)

== See also ==
- Optical Society of America#Past Presidents of the OSA
