= Cecil Williams (basketball) =

American basketball player (born 1995)

Personal information
- Born: May 28, 1995 (age 31) Columbia, Missouri, U.S.
- Listed height: 1.98 m (6 ft 6 in)
- Listed weight: 95 kg (209 lb)

Career information
- High school: Hickman (Columbia, Missouri)
- College: Moberly Area Community College (2014–2016); Central Michigan (2016–2018)
- NBA draft: 2018: undrafted
- Playing career: 2018–present
- Position: Small forward

Career history
- 2018–2019: Sorgues Basket Club
- 2019–2020: Galitos Barreiro
- 2020–2021: Zastal Zielona Góra
- 2021–2022: Dinamo București
- 2022: Tofaş
- 2022–2023: Apollon Patras
- 2023: Manisa Büyükşehir
- 2023–2024: Fuerza Regia de Monterrey
- 2024: PAOK
- 2024: Diablos Rojos del México
- 2026: Pioneros de Los Mochis
- 2026: KB Peja
- 2026: Lobos Plateados

Cecil Williams (born May 28, 1995) is an American professional basketball player who plays as a small forward. He played college basketball for Moberly Area Community College and the Central Michigan Chippewas before beginning his professional career in 2018. He has played professionally in Europe and Mexico, including spells with Zastal Zielona Góra, PAOK and Fuerza Regia de Monterrey.

== Early life and college career ==
Williams was born in Columbia, Missouri, and attended Hickman High School. He began his college basketball career at Moberly Area Community College in 2014, spending two seasons with the institution before transferring to Central Michigan University in 2016.

He played two seasons for the Central Michigan Chippewas, completing his college career in 2018. During his final season, Williams averaged 14.9 points, 6.5 rebounds and 2.6 assists per game in 36 appearances.

== Professional career ==
=== Sorgues and Galitos Barreiro (2018–2020) ===
Williams began his professional career in France with Sorgues Basket Club during the 2018–19 season. He averaged 13.2 points, 5.1 rebounds and 2.0 assists in 34 games.

For the 2019–20 season, he joined Galitos Barreiro in Portugal, where he averaged 16.8 points, 6.8 rebounds and 3.1 assists per game in 22 league appearances.

=== Zastal Zielona Góra (2020–2021) ===
In 2020, Williams signed with Zastal Zielona Góra of the Polish Basketball League. He also represented the club in the VTB United League. Across 52 appearances in the two competitions during the 2020–21 season, he averaged 6.3 points, 3.3 rebounds and 1.2 assists per game.

Williams was a member of the team that won the 2021 Polish Supercup.

=== Dinamo București (2021–2022) ===
Williams moved to Romania for the 2021–22 season, joining Dinamo București. He averaged 11.4 points, 4.4 rebounds and 1.5 assists in 32 domestic league games.

=== Turkey and Apollon Patras (2022–2023) ===
Williams began the 2022–23 season with Tofaş in Turkey, appearing in the Basketball Champions League and the Basketbol Süper Ligi.

He subsequently joined Apollon Patras in Greece, making one league appearance in which he scored 12 points against PAOK. He returned to Turkey to finish the season with Manisa Büyükşehir, averaging 9.8 points, 4.4 rebounds and 1.9 assists in 15 league games.

=== Fuerza Regia and PAOK (2023–2024) ===
In 2023, Williams joined Fuerza Regia de Monterrey in Mexico, contributing to the club's championship-winning campaign in the Liga Nacional de Baloncesto Profesional.

On January 29, 2024, Williams signed with PAOK of the Greek Basket League for the remainder of the 2023–24 season. He appeared in 10 Greek league games, averaging 5.1 points and 3.6 rebounds per game.

=== Diablos Rojos del México (2024) ===
Williams returned to Mexico in 2024 to play for Diablos Rojos del México. He averaged 9.0 points and 4.1 rebounds in 12 appearances, shooting 51.6 percent from three-point range.

=== Pioneros de Los Mochis and Peja (2026) ===
In early 2026, Williams joined Pioneros de Los Mochis in the Mexican CIBACOPA, appearing in three games and averaging 10.7 points, 3.7 rebounds and 2.7 assists.

On March 5, 2026, he joined KB Peja in Kosovo. He played 12 league games for the club, averaging 10.8 points and 3.5 rebounds per game.

=== Lobos Plateados (2026) ===
In June 2026, Williams joined Lobos Plateados of Puebla for the Mexican Liga Nacional de Baloncesto Profesional season. The signing marked his return to the league after previous spells with Fuerza Regia and Diablos Rojos.

He subsequently left the club during the 2026 season, having appeared in 15 games. He averaged approximately 5.5 points and 2.1 rebounds per game during his time in Puebla.

== Career statistics ==
=== Selected professional seasons ===
Season	Team	GP	PPG	RPG	APG
2018–19	Sorgues	34	13.2	5.1	2.0
2019–20	Galitos Barreiro	22	16.8	6.8	3.1
2020–21	Zastal Zielona Góra	52	6.3	3.3	1.2
2021–22	Dinamo București	32	11.4	4.4	1.5
2023–24	PAOK	10	5.1	3.6	0.5
2024	Diablos Rojos	12	9.0	4.1	1.4
2026	Peja	12	10.8	3.5	1.3

== Honours ==
- Liga Nacional de Baloncesto Profesional champion: 2023
- Polish Supercup winner: 2021
