= Holly Williams =

Holly Williams may refer to:

- Holly Williams (journalist), Australian foreign correspondent and war correspondent
- Holly Williams (musician) (b. 1981), American singer-songwriter
- Holly Williams (writer), Welsh arts and features writer and theatre critic
