= Lily Williams =

Lily Williams may refer to:

- Lily Williams (artist) (1874–1940), Irish painter
- Lily Williams (cyclist) (born 1994), American professional racing cyclist
- Lily Tang Williams (born 1964), American politician

== See also ==
- Lilly Williams, American Negro league baseball player
