= Norman Williams =

Norman Williams may refer to:

- Norman Williams (Australian cricketer) (1899–1947), Australian cricketer
- Norman Williams (New Zealand cricketer) (1864–1928), New Zealand cricketer
- Norman Williams (RAAF officer) (1914–2007), Royal Australian Air Force officer
- Norman Williams (politician) (1791–1868), Vermont attorney and politician
- Norman Williams (producer) (1918–2010), British actor and film producer
- N. P. Williams (1883–1943, Norman Powell Williams), Anglo-Catholic theologian
- Sir Norman Stanley Williams (born 1947), British surgeon
- Aron Kincaid (born Norman Neale Williams II, 1940–2011), American actor
