= Martin Williams =

Martin Williams may refer to:

- Martin Williams (writer) (1924–1992), American music critic
- Martin Williams (priest) (born 1937), Welsh archdeacon
- Martin Williams (diplomat) (born 1941), former British ambassador
- Martin Williams (environmental scientist) (1947–2020), chemist and environmental scientist
- Martin Williams (footballer) (born 1973), English footballer
- Martin Lloyd Williams (born 1965), archdeacon of Brighton and Lewes
- Martin Williams (politician) (1858–1934), American politician in the Virginia House of Delegates
- H. Martin Williams (1840–1924), American government official, newspaper publisher, lawyer, and educator
- Marty Williams (born 1951), American politician

== See also ==
- Martin Williams Advertising, an advertising agency, based in Minneapolis, Minnesota
- Martyn Williams (disambiguation)
