= Margaret Williams =

Margaret Williams may refer to:

- Margaret Hicks Williams (1899–1972), American government official, writer, political expert
- Margaret Lindsay Williams (1888–1960), Welsh artist
- Margaret Wetherby Williams (1901–1984), British writer of mysteries
- Maggie Williams (born 1954), American campaign manager for Hillary Clinton
- Margaret JoBeth Williams (born 1948), American actress
- Peggy R. Williams, American college president
- Margaret Vyner (1914–1993), actress and playwright, married name Williams
- Maisie Williams (born 1997 as Margaret Williams), British actress
- Margaret Williams (film director) (1950–2024), British film and television director
- Margaret Critchley (born 1949), British Olympian, married name Williams
