= Hayley Williams (disambiguation) =

Hayley Williams (born 1988) is an American singer and musician, best known as the frontwoman of the band Paramore.

Hayley Williams may also refer to:

- Hayley J Williams, British actress
- Hayley Williams (ice hockey) (born 1990), American professional ice hockey player

== See also ==
- William Hayley (1745–1820), English biographer
- Liv.e (Hailee Olivia Williams) (born 1998), American musician
