= Sian Williams (disambiguation) =

Sian Williams (born 1964) is a Welsh journalist and current affairs presenter.

Sian Williams may also refer to:

- Sian Williams (footballer) (born 1968), Welsh international footballer and manager
- Sian Williams (rugby union) (born 1990), Welsh rugby union player
- Sian Reese-Williams (born 1981), Welsh actress
