= Lindsay Williams =

Lindsay Williams can refer to:

- Lindsay Williams (canoeist) (born 1946), British canoeist
- Lindsay Williams (cricketer) (1933-2008), New Zealand cricketer
- Lindsay Williams (cross-country skier) (born 1984), American cross-country skier
