= Debbie Williams skydiving incident =

1987 high-altitude collision

On April 18, 1987, two skydivers, Guy Fitzwater and Debbie Williams, collided at 9,000 feet altitude in Coolidge, Arizona. Debbie, an American teacher from Post, Texas, was knocked unconscious, but eventually survived the incident.

== Incident ==
Debbie and Guy took part in a group of people going skydiving intending to form circle formations. Instructor Gregory Robertson oversaw everything and went last, but wind blew Guy away from one of the circles. Another skydiver named Alex Rodríguez joined that circle after this causing them to fall faster. Both Guy and Debbie tried to join the circle next, but neither of them saw the other. They collided at 9,000 feet going about 50 mph, Guy was still able to open his parachute despite his injuries, but Debbie was knocked unconscious. Gregory, seeing her falling to her death, dove toward her, and caught up with her at 3,500 feet, ten seconds before impact. He pulled her rip cord at 2,000 feet, saving her life, then quickly pulled his own. On the ground, Dean Baker, an emergency medical technician and parachutist who had come to watch, noticed Debbie before she landed. He discovered blood on her face and used inflatable leg splints to stabilize her blood pressure before a helicopter took Debbie to a hospital. She suffered a skull fracture, broken ribs, a lacerated liver, a punctured lung, and an injured kidney, but survived.

The incident received wide attention with Robertson receiving many awards and the event itself being reenacted on episodes of Rescue 911 and It's a Miracle. It was also listed for years in The Guinness Book Of Records as the lowest midair rescue ever.
