= Wendell Williams (disambiguation) =

Wendell Williams (born 1968) is a Trinidad and Tobago long jumper.

Wendell Williams may also refer to:

- C. J. Williams (born 1990), American basketball player
- Wendell Williams (politician), American politician
