= Marsha Williams (disambiguation) =

Marsha Williams may refer to:

- Marsha Garces Williams (born 1956), American film producer
- Marsha Rhea Williams (born 1948), American computer scientist, researcher, and educator
