= Ian Williams =

Ian Williams may refer to:

- Ian Williams (American football) (born 1989), Notre Dame nose tackle
- Ian Williams (fencer) (born 1967), British fencing coach
- Ian Williams (footballer, born 1942), Australian rules footballer for Geelong
- Ian Williams (footballer, born 1957), Australian rules footballer for Swan Districts and Footscray
- Ian Williams (musician) (born 1970), American guitarist
- Ian Williams (rugby union) (born 1963), Australian rugby union player
- Ian Williams (sailor) (born 1977), British sailor
- Ian Williams (speedway rider) (1931–2024), Welsh speedway rider
- Ian Williams (tennis) (born 1971), American tennis player
- Ian Williams (writer) (born 1979), Canadian poet and fiction writer
