= Heather Williams =

Heather Williams may refer to:

- Heather Stevens née Williams, a character on the American soap opera The Young and the Restless
- Heather A. Williams, professor of Africana Studies at the University of Pennsylvania
- Heather Williams (biologist) (born 1955), American ornithologist and professor at Williams College
- Heather Williams (physicist) (born 1977), British medical physicist
- Heather Williams (singer) (born 1976), American singer-songwriter
- Tui T. Sutherland (born 1978), children's book author who has also written under the pen name Heather Williams
