= Kevin Williams =

Kevin Williams may refer to:

== Sports ==
=== American football ===
- Kevin Williams (defensive back, born 1961), American football cornerback
- Kevin Williams (defensive back, born 1975), American football defensive back
- Kevin Williams (defensive tackle) (born 1980), American football defensive tackle
- Kevin Williams (running back) (1970–2012), American football running back
- Kevin Williams (wide receiver, born 1958) (1958–1996), American football wide receiver and sprinter
- Kevin Williams (wide receiver, born 1971), American football wide receiver
- K. D. Williams (Kevin Dewayne Williams Sr., born 1973), American football player

=== Other sports ===
- Kevin Williams (basketball) (born 1961), retired American basketball player

== Others ==
- Kevin Williams (music producer) (born 1956), Canadian music producer and audio engineer
- Kevin Williams or K-Warren (born 1974), UK garage producer

== See also ==
- Kevon Williams (born 1991), American rugby player
