= Warren Williams =

Warren Williams may refer to:

- Warren Williams (American football) (born 1965), American football player
- Butch Williams (born 1952), American ice hockey player
- Warren H Williams (born 1963), Australian country music singer and songwriter
- Warren Heywood Williams (1844–1888), American architect
- Warren Williams (rock musician) (1940–2025), Australian rock music singer and songwriter

== See also ==
- Warren William (1894–1948), American actor
