= Lucy Williams (disambiguation) =

Lucy Williams (born 1976) is an Australian Paralympic swimmer.

Lucy Williams may also refer to:

- Lucy Ariel Williams (1905–1973), African-American poet
- Lucy Gwendolen Williams (1870–1955), Welsh sculptor and painter
- Lucy Williams (golfer) in 2014 U.S. Women's Open
- Lucie Campbell-Williams (1885–1963), American composer and director of gospel music
- Lucy Williams (EastEnders), EastEnders character
