= Earl Williams =

Earl Williams may refer to:

- Earl Williams (1920s catcher) (1903–1958), Major League Baseball player, 1928
- Earl Williams (1970s catcher) (1948–2013), Major League Baseball player, 1970–1977
- Earl Williams (basketball coach), American basketball coach (1905–1908) of the Akron Zips
- Earl Williams (basketball player) (born 1951), American-Israeli basketball player
- Earl Williams (politician) (born 1964), former Leader of the Opposition in Dominica
- Earl Larkin Williams (1903–1974), American astronomer and mathematician
- Earl Williams, fictional accused murderer in Ben Hecht and Charles MacArthur's 1928 play The Front Page and numerous of its adaptations

== See also ==
- Earle Williams (1880–1927), silent film actor
- Earle E. Williams (1898–1983), California historian
