= Josephine Williams (disambiguation) =

Josephine Williams may refer to:

- Jo Williams (born 1948), British civil servant
- Josephine Oluseyi Williams (born 1956), Nigerian financial expert, Public administrator and former Lagos State Head of Service
