= Owain Williams =

Owain Williams is the name of:

- Owain Williams (politician) (born 1935), Welsh politician
- Owain Williams (rugby union) (1964–2021), Welsh rugby union player
- Owain Fôn Williams (born 1987), Welsh footballer
- Owain Williams, Welsh guitarist with the rock group Xerath
