= Mason Williams (disambiguation) =

Mason Williams (born 1938) is an American musician.

Mason Williams may also refer to:

- Mason Lamar Williams (1943–2021), American engineer
- Mason Williams, former ring name of American professional wrestler Mason Ryan (born 1982)
- Mason Williams (baseball) (born 1991), American baseball player

== See also ==
- Maston Williams, American actor
