= Rodric Williams =

Solicitor

Rodric Williams is a Solicitor employed by the British Post Office as head of legal (dispute resolution and brand). He was admitted as a solicitor 15 March 2002 with his full name being Rodric David Alun Williams. He has been described by the BBC as a "top Post Office lawyer". He was described in an article by The Lawyer about what they called the Post Office Scandal as one of the people dishing out orders on behalf of the Post Office. Williams gave evidence in April 2024 concerning the Horizon IT scandal.

Williams was a member of the Post Office’s High Court group litigation order steering group who presented possibilities for dealing with claimants including one which proposed a course that would increase expense to an extent that would lead to the abandonment of claims.
