= Kimberly Williams =

Kim or Kimberly Williams may refer to:

== People ==
- Kimberly Williams-Paisley (born 1971), American actress
- Kimberly Williams (triple jumper) (born 1988), Jamaican triple jumper
- Kimberly Williams (politician), American politician in the state of Delaware
- Kim Williams (architect), American independent scholar of architecture and mathematics
- Kim Williams (writer) (1923–1986), American naturalist and writer
- Kim Williams (media executive) (born 1952), Australian media executive
- Kim Williams (songwriter) (1947–2016), American country music songwriter
- Kim Williams (basketball) (born 1974), American former professional basketball player
- Kim A. Williams Sr. (born 1955), American cardiologist
- Kimberly Irene "Kim" Williams, one of conspirators of the 2013 Kaufman County murders

== Other uses ==
- Kim Williams, a character in the American film Another Earth

== See also ==
- Kimberly Williamson (born 1993), a Jamaican athlete
