= Ralph Williams =

Ralph Williams may refer to:

== Entertainers ==
- Ralph Williams (author) (1914–1959), American science fiction author
- Ralph Williams (actor), a Broadway and film actor who appeared in 1976 film All the President's Men
- Skip Williams (active since 1980s), American games designer
- Ralph Williams, an actor who appeared in the American 2011 comedy film Answer This!

== Sportspeople ==
- Ralph Williams (cricketer) (1879–1958), English cricketer and barrister
- Ralph Williams (athlete) (1900-1941), American long-distance runner
- Ralph Williams (footballer) (1905–1985), Welsh professional football centre forward
- Ralph Williams (American football) (born 1958)
- Ralph Williams (rodeo), cowboy in 2012 National Finals Rodeo

== Others ==
- Ralph Williams (politician) (fl. 1870s), Mississippi politician
- Ralph Champneys Williams (1848–1927), colonial governor
- Ralph Vaughan Williams (1872–1958), English composer
- R. C. Williams (1888–1984), Assistant Surgeon General of the U.S. Public Health Service
- Ralph E. Williams (1917–2009), United States Navy officer and speechwriter for Dwight D. Eisenhower
