= Nelson Williams =

Nelson Williams may refer to:

- Nelson Williams (politician) (1825–1899), American businessman from Canada, Rep. politician (Wisconsin senator)
- Nelson Williams (trumpeter) (1917–1973), American jazz trumpeter
- Nelson G. Williams (1823–1897), American army officer
