= Faith M. Williams =

American economist

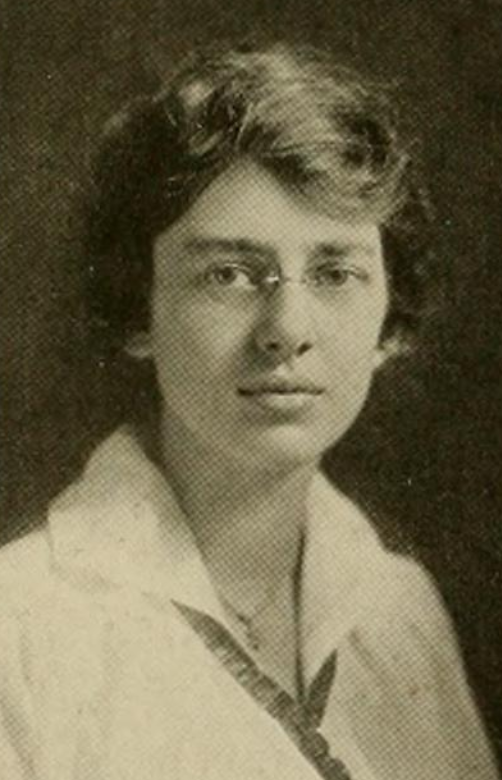
Faith Moors Williams, from a 1915 yearbook

Faith Moors Williams (1893–1958) was an American economist who became Director of the Office of Foreign Labor Conditions in the Bureau of Labor Statistics.

Williams graduated from Wellesley College in 1915, and earned a Ph.D. in economics from Columbia University in 1924. Her doctoral dissertation was The Food Manufacturing Industries in New York and its Environs: Present Trends and Probable Future Developments. She then worked on rural nutrition as an assistant professor in the College of Home Economics at Cornell University, and assisted with the economic components of the Middletown studies.

Next, Williams became a senior economist in the Bureau of Home Economics. There, with Carle C. Zimmerman of Harvard University, she coordinated a massive survey of international home living conditions and expenses, published in 1935 as Studies of Family Living in the United States and Other Countries: An Analysis of Material and Method. Later, at the Bureau of Labor Statistics, with Aryness Joy Wickens and Stella Stewart, Williams became one of the primary people in charge of the BLS cost-of-living index, later to become the United States Consumer Price Index.

Williams' husband was demographer Frank Lorimer, who had studied at Columbia at approximately the same time as she did. They had two children.

In 1946, Williams was elected as a Fellow of the American Statistical Association, two years after her husband attained the same honor.
