= Toni Williams (legal scholar) =

British legal scholar

Toni Williams is a British legal academic at Cambridge University. She is Senior Tutor of Girton College, Cambridge.

== Early life and education ==
Williams studied jurisprudence at the University of Oxford, graduating with a Bachelor of Arts (BA) degree in 1981. She then undertook a Doctor of Philosophy (PhD) degree at Newcastle University. She was awarded a Doctor of Laws (LLD) honoris causa degree by University College London in 2023.

== Academic career ==
Her first academic appointment was as a lecturer in law at University College London in 1984, before lecturing at the Osgoode Hall Law School of York University in Toronto, Canada, for the next two decades. She then returned to England and moved to the University of Kent in 2007, where she rose to be Professor of Law and head of the Kent Law School from 2015 to 2020. In October 2022, she moved to Cambridge to become senior tutor of Girton College.

Williams has also held visiting positions at the University of Wisconsin Law School in the United States, the University of Toronto Law School in Canada, City University of Hong Kong in Hong Kong and the Universidade Federal do Rio Grande do Sul in Brazil.
