= Wendy Williams (disambiguation) =

Wendy Williams (born 1964) is an American radio and television personality.

Wendy Williams may also refer to:

== People ==
- Wendy Williams (British actress) (1934–2019)
- Wendy Williams (cricketer) (1942–2012), Welsh cricketer
- Wendy Williams (diver) (born 1967), American Olympic diver
- Wendy M. Williams (born 1960), American psychologist and professor
- Wendy O. Williams (1949–1998), American singer

== Other uses ==
- Wendy Williams: The Movie, a 2021 American made-for-TV biopic
- The Wendy Williams Show, an American talk show
- Wendy Williams (Home and Away), a character from the Australian soap opera Home and Away

== See also ==
- Wendy Berger (born Wendy Leigh Williams in 1968), American judge
- The Wendy Williams Experience, a 2006 American reality TV show
