= Clyde Williams =

Clyde Williams may refer to:

- Clyde Williams (American football) (1879–1938), American football player and coach
- Clyde Williams (guard) (1940–2019), American football player
- Clyde Williams (baseball) (1920–2005), American Negro league baseball player
- Clyde Williams (Missouri politician) (1873–1954), U.S. Representative from Missouri
- Clyde Williams (New York politician), candidate for Congress in New York's 13th Congressional District
