= Stacey Williams (disambiguation) =

Stacey Williams (born 1968) is an American fashion model.

Stacey Williams may refer to:

- Stacey Williams (swimmer) (born 1981), Australian Paralympic swimmer
- Stacey-Ann Williams (born 1999), Jamaican athlete
