= Gabrielle Williams (disambiguation) =

Gabrielle Williams (born 1982), is an Australian politician.

Gabby or Gabrielle Williams may refer to:

- Gabby Williams (born 1996), American basketball player
- Gabrielle Williams (author) (1963–2023), Australian author
