= Leon Williams =

Leon Williams may refer to:

- Leon Williams (American football) (born 1983), American football linebacker
- Leon Williams (actor), British theatre actor
- Leon Williams (baseball) (1905–1984), Major League Baseball player
- Leon Williams (boxer) (born 1983), British boxer
- Leon Williams (basketball, born 1986), basketball player
- Leon Williams (basketball, born 1991), Dutch basketball player
- Leon Williams (politician) (1922–2025), American politician
- Leon Jay Williams (born 1976), Eurasian Singaporean singer and actor
- Leon Norman Williams (1914–1999), British philatelic writer
