= Carol Williams =

Carol Williams may refer to:

- Carol Williams (politician) (born 1949), majority leader of the Montana State Senate
- Carol Williams (organist) (born 1962), American organist and composer
- Carol Williams (singer), American singer and songwriter who achieved success in the 1970s
- Carol Lynch Williams, author of young adult novels
