= Lorenzo Williams =

Lorenzo Williams may refer to:

- Lorenzo Williams (basketball, born 1969), American NBA basketball player
- Lorenzo Williams (basketball, born 1984) American basketball player
- Lorenzo Williams (American football) (born 1984), American football defensive tackle
- Hosea Lorenzo Williams (1926–2000), American civil rights activist
