= Vince Williams =

Vince Williams may refer to:

- Vince Williams (actor) (1957–1997), American actor
- Vince Williams (American football) (born 1989), American football linebacker
- Vince Williams (ice hockey) (born 1975), Canadian ice hockey defenseman
- Vince Williams Jr. (born 2000), American basketball player
- Vince Williams (sprinter) (born 1977), American sprinter, 2000 All-American for the USC Trojans track and field team
