= Megan Williams =

Megan Williams may refer to:

- Megan Williams case, Megan Williams, American woman who was held against her will by 6 people who kidnapped tortured and raped her.
- Megan Williams (actress) (1956–2000), Australian actress and singer
- Megan Williams (artist) (born 1956), American contemporary artist
- Megan Williams (author) (born 1984), Canadian author
- Megan Williams-Stewart (born 1987), American figure skater
- Megan Williams, fictional protagonist of My Little Pony
