= Connor Williams =

Connor Williams may refer to:

- Connor Williams (cricketer) (born 1973), Indian cricketer
- Connor Williams (Canadian football) (born 1991), Canadian football defensive lineman for the Ottawa Redblacks
- Connor Williams (American football) (born 1997), former American football offensive lineman
- Connor Williams (rugby league) (born 1998), rugby league footballer
