= Leonard Williams (disambiguation) =

Leonard Williams (born 1994) is an American football defensive lineman for the Seattle Seahawks.

Leonard, Len or Lenny Williams may also refer to:

- Len Williams (Canadian football) (born 1971), Canadian football quarterback
- Len Williams (footballer) (1898–1932), English footballer
- Len Williams (rugby union) (1898-1972), New Zealand international rugby union player
- Len Williams (speedway rider) (1921–2007), English international speedway rider
- Leonard Williams (actor) (1917–1962), British actor
- Leonard Williams (bishop) (1829–1916), Anglican bishop in New Zealand
- Leonard Williams (physician) (1861– 1939), Welsh physician and writer
- Leonard Williams (politician) (1904–1972), British politician and Governor General of Mauritius
- Leonard Williams (running back) (born 1960), American football running back
- Leonard E. H. Williams (1919–2007), former head of the Nationwide Building Society and Spitfire pilot
- Lenny Williams (born 1945), American singer
- Lenny Williams (Canadian football) (born 1981), US Canadian football player

== See also ==
- Leonardo Williams, (born 1980 or 1981), American restaurateur and politician
