= Carroll Williams (Canadian football) =

American gridiron football player

Profile
- Position: Quarterback

Personal information
- Born: Miami, Florida, U.S.
- Listed height: 6 ft 1 in (1.85 m)
- Listed weight: 190 lb (86 kg)

Career information
- High school: Miami (FL) Archbishop Curley
- College: Xavier

Career history
- 1967–1969: Montreal Alouettes
- 1970: BC Lions

Carroll Williams is an American former professional football quarterback who played four seasons in the Canadian Football League (CFL) with the Montreal Alouettes and BC Lions. He played college football at Xavier University.

== Early life ==
Williams played high school football and basketball at Archbishop Curley High School in Miami, Florida. He was the first African-American to enroll at the school.

== College career ==
Williams played for the Xavier Musketeers from 1963 to 1966. He became starting quarterback for the Musketeers midway though his sophomore year in 1964. He was selected to the All-Catholic All-American Team and chosen as the 1965 Catholic College Player of the Year (The Brooklyn Tablet) after his junior year in 1965. Williams was also played in the North-South Mahi Shiner's All Star Football Game in Miami, Florida, after his senior year in 1966. He was inducted into the Xavier Athletic Hall of Fame in 1982. He recorded career totals of 4,000 yards on 33 passing touchdowns and also scored ten rushing touchdowns during his college career.

== Professional career ==
Williams played for the CFL's Montreal Alouettes from 1967 to 1969. He lost the starting quarterback job to Sonny Wade in 1969. He played for the BC Lions of the CFL in 1970.

== Personal life ==
Williams worked in education after his playing career.
