= Bernard Williams (disambiguation) =

Sir Bernard Williams (1929–2003) was an English moral philosopher.

Bernard or Bernie Williams may also refer to:

== Sports ==
- Bernard Williams (footballer) (1908–2004), Irish footballer
- Bernie Williams (bowls) (fl. 1957–1958), Welsh lawn bowler
- Bernie Williams (basketball) (1945–2002), American basketball player
- Bernie Williams (1970s outfielder) (born 1948), American baseball outfielder
- Bernie Williams (born 1968), Puerto Rican baseball outfielder
- Bernard Williams (gridiron football) (born 1972), American football player
- Bernard Williams (sprinter) (born 1978), American athlete

== Others ==
- Bernard Williams (priest) (1869–1943), English Anglican priest
- Bernard Williams (producer) (1942–2015), British film producer and production manager
- Bernie Williams (artist) (born 1957), Haida and Coast Salish artist and activist
- Bernard Williams, fictional character in the animated TV series Craig of the Creek
