= Martyn Williams (disambiguation) =

Martyn Williams (born 1975) is a Wales and British Lions international rugby union player.

Martyn Williams may also refer to:

- Martyn Williams (broadcaster) (born 1947), Welsh television and radio journalist/presenter
- Martyn S. Williams (born 1947), British explorer
