= Denis John Williams =

Welsh neurologist and epileptologist (1908–1990)

- Born: 6 December 1908; Bangor, Gwynedd, Wales
- Died: 26 November 1990 (aged 81)
- Occupation: Neurologist

Denis John Williams CBE FRCP (1908–1990) was a Welsh neurologist and epileptologist.

== Biography ==
Denis Williams graduated from the University of Manchester with BSc in 1929, MB ChB in 1932, and MD in 1935.

In the mid-1930s he was awarded a Rockefeller travelling fellowship to Harvard University where he worked with Stanley Cobb and collaborated with Fred Gibbs in his pioneering work on the application of EEG to the study of cerebral disease. It was at this time that he developed his lasting interest in epilepsy.

In 1936 Denis Williams returned and brought the first electroencephalograph machine that was used regularly for clinical work in the UK. He qualified MRCP in 1937 and graduated MSc in 1938. During WWII he became a squadron leader in the Royal Air Force Volunteer Reserve and worked at the Military Hospital for Head Injuries under Charles Symonds, who was knighted in 1946. Williams graduated DSc in 1942 and was elected FRCP in 1943. Symonds and Williams published in 1943 Clinical and Statistical Study of Neurosis Precipitated by Flying Duties. Williams was promoted to wing commander before demobilisation.

He was appointed in 1946 physician to the National Hospital for Nervous Diseases and to St George’s Hospital. In the late 1940s he was a mentor to Basil Gerald Parsons-Smith. In 1951 Williams was appointed Civil Consultant in Neurology and Electroencephalography to the RAF. In 1955 he gave the Bradshaw Lecture and was appointed CBE. He retired from St George's Hospital in 1968 and from the National Health Service in 1974. In 1971 he was a founder trustee of the Brain Research Trust. For a number of years he was the editor of Brain: A Journal of Neurology.

He had married Joyce, daughter of Frank Beverley Jewson, in 1936. She was herself a qualified medical practitioner and a Justice of the Peace. They had four children; two sons and two daughters. One son predeceased him.

== See also ==
List of Welsh medical pioneers

== Selected publications ==
- Williams, D. (1941). "The Significance of an Abnormal Electroencephalogram". Journal of Neurology and Psychiatry. 4 (3–4): 257–268. doi:10.1136/jnnp.4.3-4.257. PMC 1089790. PMID 21611396.
- Williams, D. (1941). "The Electro-Encephalogram in Acute Head Injuries". Journal of Neurology and Psychiatry. 4 (2): 107–130. doi:10.1136/jnnp.4.2.107. PMC 1088211. PMID 21611387.
- Williams, D. (1944). "The Electroencephalogram in Traumatic Epilepsy". Journal of Neurology, Neurosurgery, and Psychiatry. 7 (3–4): 103–111. doi:10.1136/jnnp.7.3-4.103. PMC 1061352. PMID 21610869.
- Williams, D. (1947). "Poliomyelitis Limited to both Trigeminal Motor Nuclei". Proceedings of the Royal Society of Medicine. 40 (10): 555–556. PMC 2183605. PMID 20344687.
- Parsons-Smith, G.; Williams, D. (1949). "Cerebral Embolism Following Contusion of Heart". British Medical Journal. 1 (4591): 10–12. doi:10.1136/bmj.1.4591.10. PMC 2049208. PMID 18104666.
- Williams, D. (1950). "New Orientations in Epilepsy". British Medical Journal. 1 (4655): 685–692. doi:10.1136/bmj.1.4655.685. PMC 2037251. PMID 20787814.
- Williams, D. (1950). "Boeck's Sarcoidosis of the Nervous System". Proceedings of the Royal Society of Medicine. 43 (4): 253–254. PMC 2081292. PMID 15417563.
- Williams, D. (1953). "Phenomena of Epilepsy". British Medical Journal. 1 (4803): 173–176. doi:10.1136/bmj.1.4803.173. PMC 2015320. PMID 13009130.
- Williams, D. (1954). "The Electroencephalogram in Affective Disorders". Proceedings of the Royal Society of Medicine. 47 (9): 779–782. PMC 1919036. PMID 13204298.
- Williams, D. (1955). "Fits". British Medical Journal. 1 (4912): 532–533. doi:10.1136/bmj.1.4912.532. PMC 2061188. PMID 13230550.
- Williams, D. (1963). "The Psychiatry of the Epileptic". Proceedings of the Royal Society of Medicine. 56 (8): 707–710. PMC 1897445. PMID 14052458.
- Williams, D. (1966). "Temporal Lobe Epilepsy". British Medical Journal. 1 (5501): 1439–1442. doi:10.1136/bmj.1.5501.1439. PMC 1844693. PMID 5933045.
- Williams, D. (1967). "The Clinical Application of Electrophysiological Techniques". Journal of the Royal College of Physicians of London. 1 (2): 134–140. PMC 5337541. PMID 30667623.
