= HarperCollins =

British-American publishing company

HarperCollins Publishers LLC

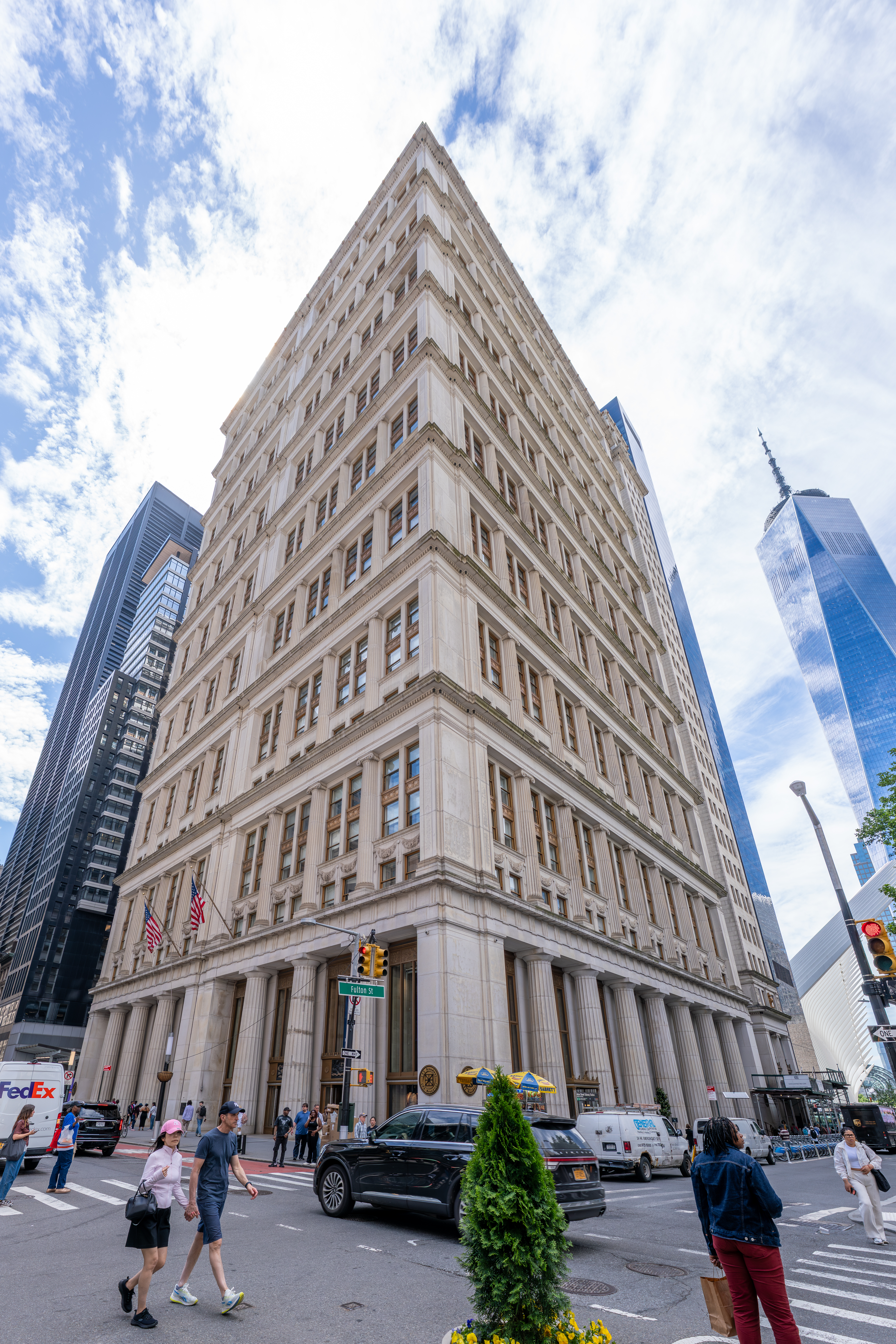
- HarperCollins' headquarters at 195 Broadway
- Trade name: HarperCollins
- Type: Subsidiary
- Industry: Publishing
- Founded: 1987; 39 years ago
- Founders: James Harper and John Harper
- Headquarters: The News Building, London, England, United Kingdom; 195 Broadway, New York City, United States
- Area served: Worldwide
- Revenue: ▲US$2.15 billion (2025)
- Net income: ▲US$296 million (2025)
- Number of employees: 4,000 (2025)
- Parent: News Corp
- Subsidiaries: See § Imprints
- Website: harpercollins.com; harpercollins.co.in; harpercollins.co.uk; harpercollins.com.au; harpercollins.ca; harpercollins.co.nz

HarperCollins Publishers LLC is a British-American multinational publishing conglomerate that is considered to be one of the "Big Five" English-language publishers, along with Penguin Random House, Hachette, Macmillan, and Simon & Schuster. HarperCollins is headquartered in London and New York City and is a subsidiary of News Corp.

The company's name is derived from a combination of the firm's predecessors. Harper & Brothers, founded in 1817 in New York, merged with Row, Peterson & Company in 1962 to form Harper & Row, which was acquired by News Corp in 1987. The Scottish publishing company William Collins, Sons, founded in 1819 in Glasgow, was acquired by News Corp in 1987 and merged with Harper & Row to form HarperCollins. The logo for the firm combines the fire from Harper's torch and the water from Collins' fountain.

HarperCollins operates publishing groups in the United States, Canada, the United Kingdom, Australia, New Zealand, Brazil, India, and China, and publishes under various imprints.

Brian Murray has been the company's president and chief executive since 2008.

== History ==
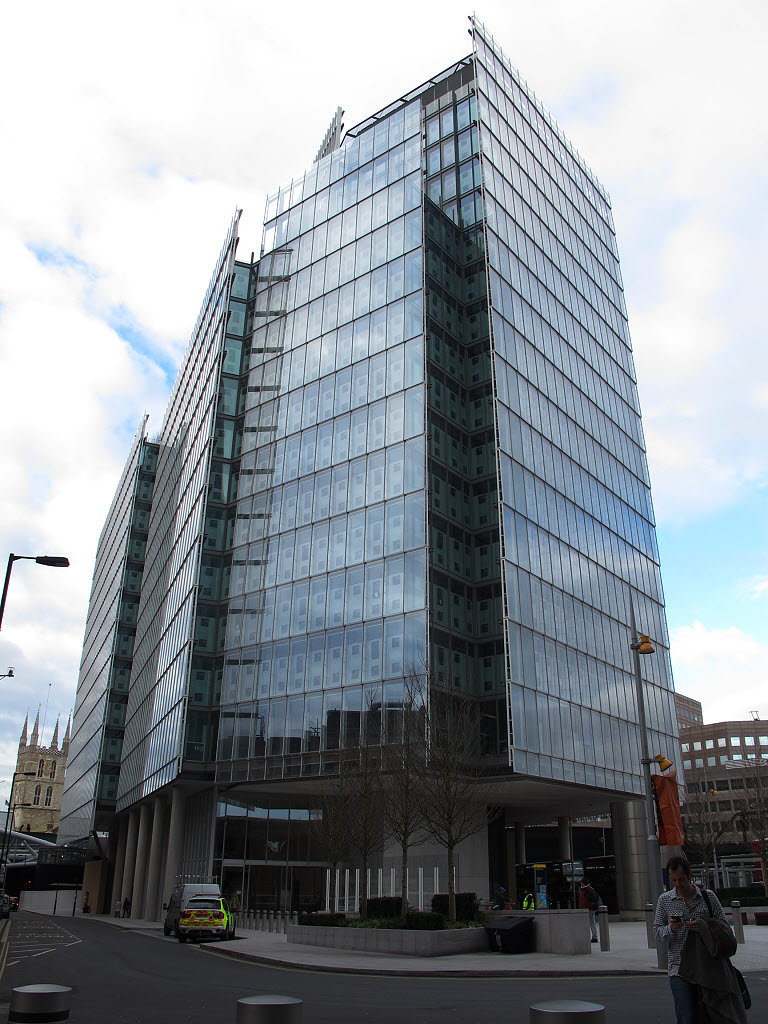
The News Building, HarperCollins' headquarters in London

The earliest of the publishing firms that comprise HarperCollins was founded in 1817 by James Harper and his brother John, initially operating under the name J & J Harper. They were later joined by two other brothers, Joseph Wesley and Fletcher Harper, with the firm becoming Harper & Brothers in 1833.

Harper & Brothers originated several notable magazine publications in the nineteenth century that would later be sold or discontinued, including Harper's Magazine, Harper's Weekly, Harper's Bazaar, and Harper's Young People.

In 1962, Harper & Brothers merged with Row, Peterson & Company to become Harper & Row. The firm acquired Thomas Y. Crowell Co. and J. B. Lippincott & Co. in the 1970s, with Crowell and the trade operations of Lippincott merged into Harper & Row in 1980. In 1988, Harper & Row purchased the religious publisher Zondervan, including subsidiary Marshall Pickering.

William Collins, Sons was established in Glasgow in 1819 by Presbyterian schoolmaster William Collins. The firm's early emphasis was on religion and education, but diversified over time, making a significant move into fiction in 1917 under the leadership of Godfrey Collins.

The Collins Crime Club imprint published many works in the Golden Age of Detective Fiction, including novels by Agatha Christie and Rex Stout. The religious imprint Fount would be home to C. S. Lewis. Collins would become the British Commonwealth publisher for a number of popular American juvenile series and authors, including The Hardy Boys, Nancy Drew, and Dr. Seuss. In the 1950s "Collins Seagull Library" published "good school stories, adventure stories, and children's classics at a popular price"

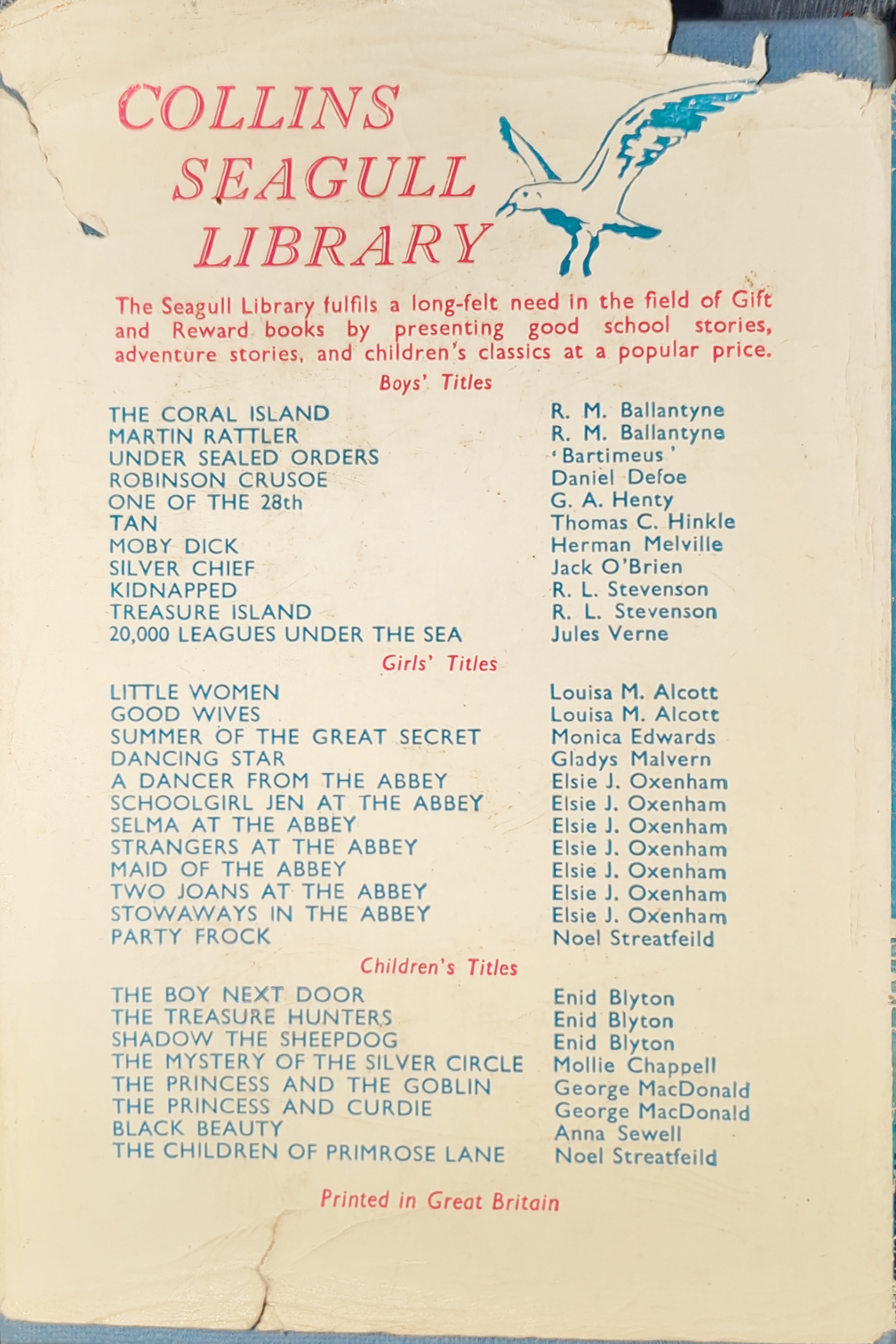
Back of 1956 a "Collins Seagull Library" book listing the titles in their collection

In November 2024, HarperCollins signed a licensing agreement with Microsoft to provide book content for training generative AI models, becoming the first major book publisher to do so.

=== Mergers and acquisitions ===
Rupert Murdoch's News Corporation acquired Harper & Row in March 1987. News Corp had owned a 40% stake in Collins since 1981 and became the sole owner in 1989. News Corp merged the two publishers in 1989, combining the name as HarperCollins and creating a logo with a stylized depiction of flames atop waves derived from the torch logo for Harper & Row and the fountain logo for Collins.

In 1990, HarperCollins sold J. B. Lippincott & Co., its medical publishing division, to the Dutch publisher Wolters Kluwer.

In 1996, HarperCollins sold Scott Foresman and HarperCollins College to Pearson, which merged them with Addison-Wesley Longman.

News Corporation purchased the Hearst Book Group, consisting of William Morrow & Company and Avon Books, in 1999. These imprints are now published under the rubric of HarperCollins. HarperCollins bought educational publisher Letts and Lonsdale in March 2010.

In 2011, HarperCollins announced they had agreed to acquire the publisher Thomas Nelson. The purchase was completed on 11 July 2012, with an announcement that Thomas Nelson would operate independently given the position it has in Christian book publishing. Both Thomas Nelson and Zondervan were then organized as imprints, or "keystone publishing programs," under a new division, HarperCollins Christian Publishing. Key roles in the reorganization were awarded to former Thomas Nelson executives.

In 2012, HarperCollins acquired part of the trade operations of John Wiley & Son in Canada.

In 2014, HarperCollins acquired Canadian romance publisher Harlequin Enterprises for C$455 million.

In 2018, HarperCollins acquired the business publisher Amacom from the American Management Association.

In 2020, HarperCollins acquired the children's publishers Egmont Books UK, Egmont Poland and Schneiderbuch Germany from the Egmont Group.

On 29 March 2021, HarperCollins announced that it would acquire HMH Books & Media, the trade publishing division of Houghton Mifflin Harcourt, for $349 million. The deal would allow HMH to pay down its debt and focus on digital education. The deal was completed on 10 May. As of 7 July 2021, HMH's adult books will be published as Mariner Books, while HMH's children's books will be published as Clarion Books.

In 2021, HarperCollins acquired the British publisher Pavilion Books.

In 2022, HarperCollins acquired Cider Mill Press.

On 16 July 2025, HarperCollins announced that it has acquired the French and German Crunchyroll manga publishing business, with the acquisition being closed on 30 September 2025.

=== Management history ===
Brian Murray, the current CEO of HarperCollins, succeeded Jane Friedman who was chief executive from 1997 to 2008. Notable management figures include Lisa Sharkey, current senior vice president and director of creative development and Barry Winkleman from 1989 to 1994.

In October 2025, the company appointed Kate Elton as its UK and Ireland interim chief executive following Charlie Redmayne's resignation.

=== United States v. Apple Inc. ===
In April 2012, the United States Department of Justice filed United States v. Apple Inc., naming Apple, HarperCollins, and four other major publishers as defendants. The suit alleged that they conspired to fix prices for e-books, and weaken Amazon.com's position in the market, in violation of antitrust law.

In December 2013, a federal judge approved a settlement of the antitrust claims, in which HarperCollins and the other publishers paid into a fund that provided credits to customers who had overpaid for books due to the price-fixing.

=== US warehouse closings ===
On 5 November 2012, HarperCollins announced to employees privately and then later in the day publicly that it was closing its remaining two US warehouses, to merge shipping and warehousing operations with R. R. Donnelley in Indiana. The Scranton, Pennsylvania, warehouse closed in September 2013 and a Nashville, Tennessee, warehouse, under the name Thomas Nelson (which distributes the religious arm of HarperCollins/Zondervan Books), in the winter of 2013. Several office positions and departments continued to work for HarperCollins in Scranton, but in a new location.

The Scranton warehouse closing eliminated about 200 jobs, and the Nashville warehouse closing eliminated up to 500 jobs; the exact number of distribution employees is unknown.

HarperCollins previously closed two US warehouses, one in Williamsport, Pennsylvania, in 2011 and another in Grand Rapids, Michigan, in 2012. "We have taken a long-term, global view of our print distribution and are committed to offering the broadest possible reach for our authors," said HarperCollins Chief Executive Brian Murray, according to Publishers Weekly. "We are retooling the traditional distribution model to ensure we can competitively offer the entire HarperCollins catalog to customers regardless of location." Company officials attribute the closings and mergers to the rapidly growing demand for e-book formats and the decline in print purchasing.

=== Internet Archive lawsuit ===
In June 2020, HarperCollins was one of a group of publishers who sued the Internet Archive, arguing that its collection of e-books was denying authors and publishers revenue and accusing the library of "willful mass copyright infringement".

=== Lindsay Lohan lawsuit ===
In September 2020, HarperCollins sued Lindsay Lohan for entering into a book deal and collecting a $350,000 advance for a tell-all memoir that never materialized.

=== Anne Frank's betrayal ===
A 2022 book written by Rosemary Sullivan, with HarperCollins as main publisher, designated Jewish notary Arnold van den Bergh as the most likely suspect in Anne Frank's betrayal. The conclusion was challenged by experts. The notary's family members threatened a lawsuit and started a foundation. The Dutch publisher withdrew the book, but HarperCollins has not taken any definitive decision.

=== UAW strike ===
On 10 November 2022, approximately 250 unionized workers at HarperCollins began an indefinite strike. Local 2110 of the United Auto Workers (UAW) union includes people in design, marketing, publicity, and sales for the company. The UAW union made the decision to strike after drawn-out negotiations between it and HarperCollins, which resulted in members "working without a contract since April." According to a spokesperson, HarperCollins "has agreed to a number of proposals that the UAW is seeking to include in a new contract" and "is disappointed an agreement has not been reached" but "will continue to negotiate in good faith."

On 21 December 2022 the local put their in-person picketing on "pause" to give strikers an opportunity to spend time with their loved ones. The picketing resumed as scheduled on 3 January 2023.

After three months of negotiations, the union agreed to a new contract with HarperCollins on 16 February 2023. Under the new terms, the annual starting pay of HarperCollins employees has increased from $45,000 to $47,500 upon ratification, and is set to rise to $50,000 by 2025. Additionally, full-time employees in the union will receive a lump sum payment of $1,500. The contract also allows workers making less than $60,000 to file for two hours of overtime pay per week without approval from a manager, and puts measures in place to compensate junior-level staff for diversity and inclusion work which is typically unpaid in the industry.

The workers returned to their duties on 21 February.

== Noted books ==
HarperCollins maintains the backlist of many of the books originally published by its many merged imprints, in addition to having picked up new authors since the merger. Authors published originally by Harper include Mark Twain, the Brontë sisters, and William Makepeace Thackeray. Authors published originally by Collins include H. G. Wells and Agatha Christie. HarperCollins also acquired the publishing rights to J. R. R. Tolkien's work in 1990 when Unwin Hyman was bought. Following is a list of some of the more noted books and series published by HarperCollins and their various imprints and merged publishing houses.

- The Hobbit, J. R. R. Tolkien (1937) (originally published by George Allen & Unwin)
- The Lord of the Rings, J. R. R. Tolkien (1954–1955) (originally published by George Allen & Unwin)
- The Art of Loving, Erich Fromm (1956)
- Master and Commander, Patrick O'Brian (1970) (adapted into the 2003 film Master and Commander: The Far Side of the World)
- the Leaphorn and Chee books, Tony Hillerman (1970–2006)
- The Silmarillion, J. R. R. Tolkien (ed. Christopher Tolkien with Guy Gavriel Kay) (1977) (originally published by George Allen & Unwin)
- Collins English Dictionary (1979), a major dictionary
- Sharpe series, Bernard Cornwell (1981–2006)
- Frida: A Biography of Frida Kahlo, Hayden Herrera (1983), adapted into the 2002 film Frida
- The History of Middle-earth series, J. R. R. Tolkien (ed. Christopher Tolkien) (1983–1996)
- Weaveworld, Clive Barker (1987)
- the Paladin Poetry Series (1987–1993)
- The Alchemist, Paulo Coelho, (1988) (first published in Portuguese as O Alquimista, 1988)
- subsequent novels in the Take Back Plenty series, Colin Greenland (1990+)
- Where There's a Will: Who Inherited What and Why, Stephen M. Silverman (1991)
- Dorothy Wordsworth's Illustrated Lakeland Journals (1991, Diamond Books)
- The Language of the Genes, Steve Jones (1993)
- The Gifts of the Body, Rebecca Brown (1994)
- Microserfs, Douglas Coupland (1995)
- Thoughts, Tionne Watkins (1999)
- Shuka Saptati: Seventy tales of the Parrot a new translation from the Sanskrit by A. N. D. Haksar (2000)
- First They Killed My Father: A Daughter of Cambodia Remembers, Loung Ung (2000)
- Bel Canto, Ann Patchett (2001)
- A Theory of Relativity, Jacquelyn Mitchard (2001)
- recent volumes in the Discworld series by Terry Pratchett (books from 2001 to present)
- American Gods, Neil Gaiman (2001)
- Boonville, Robert Mailer Anderson (2003 reprint)
- Quicksilver, Neal Stephenson (2003)
- Don Quixote, a new translation by Edith Grossman (2003, Ecco)
- Acquainted with the Night, Christopher Dewdney (2004)
- State of fear, by Michael Crichton (2004)
- Darkhouse, Alex Barclay (2005)
- Anansi Boys, Neil Gaiman (2005)
- The Hot Kid, Elmore Leonard (2005)
- Freaky Green Eyes, by Joyce Carol Oates (2006)
- Next, Michael Crichton (2006)
- Domicilium Decoratus, Kelly Wearstler (2006) ISBN 0-06-089798-8
- Pretty Little Liars, Sara Shepard (2006)
- Mister B. Gone, Clive Barker (Harper) (2007)
- Loving Natalee: A Mother's Testament of Hope and Faith, Beth Holloway (2007) (about Natalee Holloway)
- The Raw Shark Texts, Steven Hall (2007)
- The Children of Húrin, J. R. R. Tolkien (ed. Christopher Tolkien) (2007)
- The Family: The Secret Fundamentalism at the Heart of American Power, Jeff Sharlet (2008)
- Going Rogue: An American Life, Sarah Palin (2009)
- Pirate Latitudes, Michael Crichton (2009) (posthumous publication)
- Wolf Hall, Hilary Mantel (2009)
- Shattered: The True Story of a Mother's Love, a Husband's Betrayal, and a Cold-Blooded Texas Murder, Kathryn Casey (2010)
- Micro, Michael Crichton (2011) (posthumous publication)
- The Dressmaker of Khair Khana, Gayle Tzemach Lemmon (2011)
- A Shot at History: My Obsessive Journey to Olympic Gold by Abhinav Bindra (2011)
- Go Set a Watchman, Harper Lee (2015)
- The Poppy War, R. F. Kuang (2018)
- Inside the Tablighi Jamaat, Ziya Us Salam (2020)
- The Adventures of Cliff Booth, Quentin Tarantino (2026)

=== Harper children's books ===
Children's book editor Ursula Nordstrom was the director of Harper's Department of Books for Boys and Girls from 1940 to 1973, overseeing the publication of classics such as Goodnight Moon, Where the Wild Things Are, The Giving Tree, Charlotte's Web, Beverly Cleary's series starring Ramona Quimby, and Harold and the Purple Crayon. They were the publishing home of Maurice Sendak, Shel Silverstein, and Margaret Wise Brown. In 1998, Nordstrom's personal correspondence was published as Dear Genius: The Letters of Ursula Nordstrom (illustrated by Maurice Sendak), edited by Charlotte Zolotow. Zolotow began her career as a stenographer to Nordstrom, became her protégé, and went on to write more than 80 books and edit hundreds of others, including Nordstrom's The Secret Language and the works of Paul Fleischman. Zolotow later became head of the children's books department, and went on to become the company's first female vice president.

The Chronicles of Narnia series by C. S. Lewis, while not originally published by a merged imprint of HarperCollins, was acquired by the publisher.

HarperCollins has published these notable children's books:

- the I Can Read! series for beginning readers, including the Amelia Bedelia (Peggy Parish), Frog and Toad (Arnold Lobel) and Little Bear (Else Holmelund Minarik and Maurice Sendak) books
- the Warriors series (2003–present)
- the Pretty Little Liars series, by Sara Shepard (2007–present)
- A Series of Unfortunate Events, Lemony Snicket
- A Taste of Blackberries, Doris Buchanan Smith (1973)
- Skulduggery Pleasant series, Derek Landy
- Bart Simpson's Guide to Life (1993)
- international rights to Dr. Seuss (inherited from Collins; 1950s–present)
- Love That Dog, Sharon Creech (2001)
- The Giving Tree, Shel Silverstein (1964)
- Where the Sidewalk Ends, Shel Silverstein (1974)
- The Saga of Darren Shan, Darren Shan (2000–2004)
  - Cirque du Freak manga series, Darren Shan and Takahiro Arai (2006–2009)
- The Dangerous Book for Boys, Conn and Hal Iggulden (2006)
- Sabriel, Garth Nix (1995)
- A Barrel of Laughs, a Vale of Tears, Jules Feiffer (1995)
- Mister God, This Is Anna, Fynn (pseudonym of Sydney Hopkins) (1974)
- the Little House on the Prairie series, Laura Ingalls Wilder (1932–2006)
- The Wolves in the Walls, Neil Gaiman and Dave McKean (2003)
- Monster, Walter Dean Myers (1999)
- Coraline, Neil Gaiman and Dave McKean (2002)
- Surviving the Applewhites, Stephanie S. Tolan (2002)
- The Gollywhopper Games (2008)
- Ruby Redfort (series), Lauren Child (2011)
- Divergent, Veronica Roth (2011)
- Survivors series (2012–2019)
- The School for Good and Evil, Soman Chainani (2013–present)
- Splat the Cat, Rob Scotton (2007–present)
- The Secret Zoo, Bryan Chick (2010–2023)
- Charlotte's Web, E. B. White (2015)
- Little Penguin, Tadgh Bentley (2015–present)
- Elinor Wonders Why adapted books (2021–present)

== Imprints ==
HarperCollins has more than 120 book imprints, most of which are based in the United States. Collins still exists as an imprint, chiefly for wildlife and natural history books, field guides, as well as for English and bilingual dictionaries based on the Bank of English, a large corpus of contemporary English texts.

HarperCollins' imprints, including current and defunct imprints prior to various mergers, include:

=== Current ===
==== Adult ====
- Amistad Press, primarily books of African-American interest, named for the storied ship La Amistad; launched as an independent imprint in 1986 by Charles F. Harris (1934–2015), it merged with HarperCollins in 1999.
- Harlequin Enterprises
  - Carina Press
  - Graydon House Books
  - Hanover Square Press
  - Harlequin Teen
  - Harlequin Kimani Arabesque
  - Harlequin Kimani TRU
  - Harlequin Kimani Press
  - Harlequin Luna
  - HQN
  - Mira
  - Park Row Books
  - Rogue Angel
  - Silhouette Special Releases
  - Spice
  - Worldwide Mystery
- Harper
  - Broadside Books (American conservative imprint)
  - Ecco
  - Harper Business
  - Fontana Books
  - Harper Hardcover
  - Harper Paperbacks
    - Bourbon Street Books
  - Harper Perennial, originally Perennial Library
    - Harper Perennial Modern Classics
  - HarperLuxe (Large print)
  - HarperImpulse (Digital first imprint)
  - HarperTrue (Non Fiction digital first)
  - HarperOne
  - HarperVia (international books)
  - HarperVoyager, formerly Voyager, HarperCollins's worldwide science-fiction and fantasy imprint, combining the UK imprint HarperCollins Science Fiction & Fantasy (which had inherited the sci-fi and fantasy list of Collins's Grafton Books and its predecessors (Granada, Panther), as well as J. R. R. Tolkien's books from the acquisition of George Allen & Unwin) and the US imprint Eos (from the acquisition of Avon Books, which incorporated the former Harper Prism)
  - Mariner Books
  - Killer Reads (digital first Crime & Thriller imprint)
  - One More Chapter Books (Digital first Crime & Thriller imprint)
  - HarperWave
  - Harper Muse
- HarperCollins Focus
  - Blink
  - Harper Celebrate
  - Harper Horizon
  - HarperCollins Leadership
    - Amacom
  - Harper Muse
- HarperCollins UK
  - 4th Estate/Fourth Estate
  - Collins Bartholomew
  - HarperFiction
    - The Borough Press
  - HarperNonFiction
    - HarperCollins
    - HarperElement
    - Mudlark
    - Thorsons
  - HQ
  - Pavilion Books (formerly Anova Books)
  - William Collins
- William Morrow
  - Avon
    - Avon Red
    - Avon Romance
    - Mischief (digital imprint)
  - Custom House (since 2015, led by Geoff Shandler)
  - Dey Street (formerly It Books)
  - Witness
  - William Morrow Paperbacks
  - Morrow Cookbooks, a highly respected series of cookbooks

==== Children ====
- HarperCollins Children's Books
  - Harper Festival, a publisher of novelty books founded in 1992
  - HarperTeen
  - HarperTeen Impulse (digital imprint)
  - HarperTrophy
  - Harper Fire
  - HarperAlley (comic imprint)
  - Amistad
  - Balzer + Bray (2009–2024; when Alessandra Balzer and Donna Bray moved to Macmillan Publishers)
  - Storytide
  - Collins
  - Clarion Books
  - Greenwillow Books
  - Heartdrum
  - HMH Books for Young Readers
  - Katherine Tegen Books
  - Walden Pond Press
  - Blink Young Adult
- Farshore (formerly Egmont UK)
  - Electric Monkey

==== Christian ====
- Thomas Nelson
  - Grupo Nelson
  - Nelson Books
  - Tommy Nelson
  - W Publishing Group
- Zondervan
  - Editorial Vida
  - Zonderkidz
  - Zondervan Academic
  - Zondervan Reflective

==== Audio ====
- HarperAudio
- Caedmon, audiobooks
- HarperCollins Children's Audio

==== Bureau ====
- HarperCollins Speakers Bureau

==== Digital ====
- HarperCollins e-Books
- HarperCollins Productions

==== Digital first ====
- One More Chapter

==== Film and television ====
- 3000 Pictures (joint venture with Sony Pictures)

=== Defunct ===
- Unwin Hyman (formerly Allen & Unwin, which is now an independent Australian publisher)
- Angus & Robertson
- The Julie Andrews Collection
- Avon A
- Cliff Street Books
- Collins Press
- Collins GEM
- Diamond Books
- Eos Books, science fiction/fantasy, formerly an Avon Books imprint
- Flamingo
- Fontana Books / Fontana Press (see Fontana Modern Masters)
- Harper & Brothers
- Harper & Row
- Harper Design
- Harper Perennial Modern Thought
- Harper Prism, science fiction imprint (merged with Eos)
- Harper San Francisco, with a focus on religious and spiritual books (now HarperOne)
- Harper Torch
- Harper Trophy, children's book imprint
- Harper True
- HarperCollins West
- HarperSport
- Lothrop, Lee & Shepard
- Marshall Pickering
- Moonstone
- New Naturalist
- Rayo (a Latino-focused imprint)
- ReganBooks
- Salamander
- Thorsons

== Business strategy ==
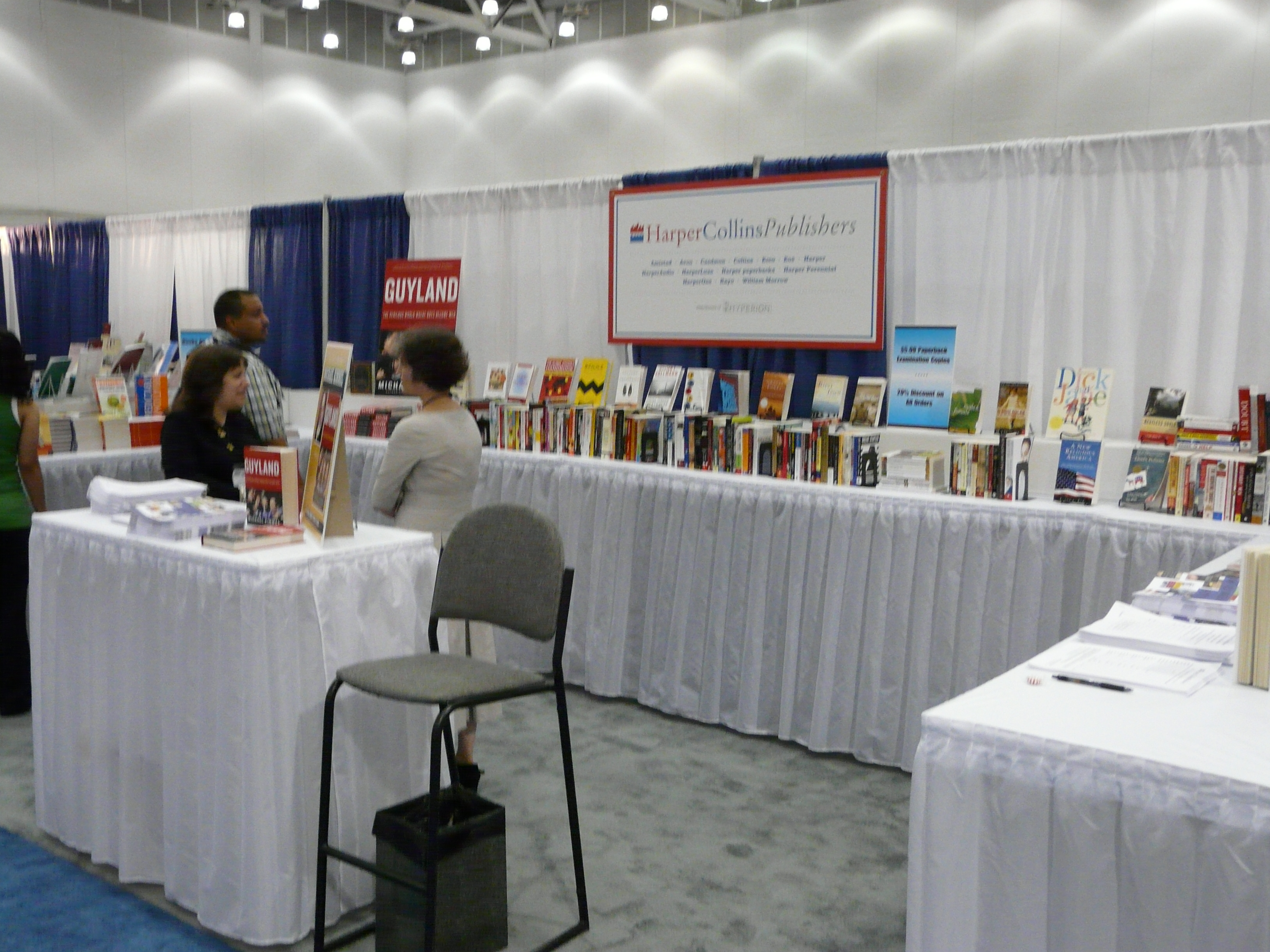
2008 conference booth

=== Web approach ===
In 2008, HarperCollins launched a browsing feature on its website where customers can read selected excerpts from books before purchasing, on both desktop and mobile browsers. This functionality gave the publisher's website the ability to compete with physical bookstores, in which customers can typically look at the book itself, and Amazon's use of excerpts ("teasers") for online book purchasers.

At the beginning of October 2013, the company announced a partnership with online digital library Scribd. The official statement revealed that the "majority" of the HarperCollins US and HarperCollins Christian catalogs will be available in Scribd's subscription service. Chantal Restivo-Alessi, chief digital officer at HarperCollins, explained to the media that the deal represents the first time that the publisher has released such a large portion of its catalog.

HarperCollins formerly operated authonomy, an online community of authors, from 2008 to 2015. The website offered an alternative to the traditional "slush pile" approach for handling unsolicited manuscripts sent to a publisher with little chance of being reviewed. Using authonomy, authors could submit their work for peer review and ranking by other members; the five highest-ranked manuscripts each month would be read by HarperCollins editors for potential publication. The site was closed after authors "learned to game the system" to earn top-five rankings, and fewer authonomy titles were selected to be published.

From 2009 to 2010, HarperCollins operated BookArmy, a social networking site.

=== Speakers Bureau ===
The HarperCollins Speakers Bureau (also known as HCSB) is the first lecture agency to be created by a major publishing house. It was launched in May 2005 as a division of HarperCollins to book paid speaking engagements for the authors HarperCollins, and its sister companies, publish. Andrea Rosen is the director.

Some of the notable authors the HCSB represents include Carol Alt, Dennis Lehane, Gregory Maguire, Danny Meyer, Mehmet Oz, Sidney Poitier, Ted Sorensen, and Kate White.

=== HarperAcademic ===
HarperAcademic is the academic marketing department of HarperCollins. HarperAcademic provides instructors with the latest in adult titles for course adoption at the high school and college level, as well as titles for first-year and other common read programs at academic institutions. They also attend several major academic conferences to showcase new titles for academic professionals.

HarperAcademic Calling, a podcast produced by the department, provides interviews with authors of noteworthy titles.

=== HarperStudio ===
HarperCollins announced HarperStudio in 2008 as a "new, experimental unit... that will eliminate the traditional profit distributions to authors. The long-established author advances and bookseller returns has not proved to be very profitable to either the author or the publisher. The approach HarperStudio is now taking is to offer little or no advance, but instead to split the profit 50% (rather than the industry standard 15%), with the author." The division was headed by Bob Miller, previously the founding publisher of Hyperion, the adult books division of the Walt Disney Company. HarperStudio folded in March 2010 after Miller left for Workman Publishing.

=== HarperCollins India ===
HarperCollins Publishers India Pvt Ltd. is a wholly owned subsidiary of HarperCollins Worldwide. It came into being in 1992.

== Controversies ==
=== If I Did It ===
If I Did It was a book written by O. J. Simpson about his alleged murder of Nicole Simpson, which was planned as a HarperCollins title, and which attracted considerable controversy and a legal battle over publication.

=== Ben Collins ===
In August 2010, the company became embroiled in a legal battle with the BBC after a book it was due to publish, later identified as the forthcoming autobiography of racing driver Ben Collins (no relation to the publishers), revealed the identity of The Stig from Top Gear. In his blog, Top Gear executive producer Andy Wilman accused HarperCollins of "hoping to cash in" on the BBC's intellectual property, describing the publishers as "a bunch of chancers". On 1 September, the BBC's request for an injunction preventing the book from being published was turned down, effectively confirming the book's revelation that "The Stig" was indeed Collins.

=== East and West ===
The company became embroiled in controversy in 1998 after it was revealed it blocked Chris Patten's (the last British governor of Hong Kong) book East and West after a direct intervention by the then-CEO of News International, Rupert Murdoch. It was later revealed by Stuart Proffitt, the editor who had worked on the book for HarperCollins, that this intervention was designed to appease the Chinese authorities—of whom the book was critical—as Murdoch intended to extend his business empire into China and did not wish to cause problems there by allowing the book to be published.

Murdoch's intervention caused both Proffitt's resignation from the company and outrage from the international media apart from affiliated companies. Chris Patten later published with Macmillan Publishing, initially in America, where it carried the logo "The book that Rupert Murdoch refused to publish". After a successful legal campaign against HarperCollins, Patten went on to publish the book in the UK in September 1998 after accepting a sum of £500,000 and receiving an apology from Rupert Murdoch.

=== Ebooks ===
In March 2011, HarperCollins announced it would distribute ebooks to libraries with DRM enabled to delete the item after being lent 26 times. HarperCollins has drawn criticism of this plan, in particular its likening of ebooks, which are purely digital, to traditional paperback trade books, which wear over time.

=== Omission of Israel from an atlas ===
In December 2014, The Tablet reported that an atlas published for Middle East schools did not label Israel on a map of the Middle East. A representative for Collins Bartholomew, a subsidiary of HarperCollins that specializes in maps, explained that including Israel would have been "unacceptable" to their customers in the Arab states of the Persian Gulf and the omission was in line with "local preferences". The company later apologized and destroyed all the books.

=== What the (Bleep) Just Happened? ===
HarperCollins announced in January 2017 that they would discontinue selling copies of Monica Crowley's book What the (Bleep) Just Happened?, due to allegations of plagiarism. The 2012 book had lifted passages from a number of sources including columns, news articles and think tank reports. HarperCollins said in a statement to CNN's KFile, "The book which has reached the end of its natural sales cycle, will no longer be offered for purchase until such time as the author has the opportunity to source and revise the material."

== See also ==
- List of largest UK book publishers
- Books in the United Kingdom
- Books in the United States
- COBUILD – a research facility set up by Collins in conjunction with the University of Birmingham
- Harper's Magazine – a separately owned magazine, although begun by the original Harper & Brothers
