= Brian Williams (disambiguation) =

Brian Williams (born 1959) is an American journalist.

Brian Williams may also refer to:

== People ==
=== Sports ===
==== American football ====
- Brian Williams (center) (born 1966), American football center
- Brian Williams (linebacker) (born 1972), American football linebacker
- Brian Williams (cornerback) (born 1979), American football cornerback
- Brian Williams (American football coach)

==== Other sports ====
- Brian Williams (Australian footballer) (1936–2010), Australian rules footballer
- Brian Williams (sportscaster) (born 1946), Canadian sportscaster
- Brian Williams (footballer, born 1955), English footballer
- Brian Williams (footballer, born 1961), Trinidadian football coach and football player
- Brian Williams (rugby union) (1962–2007), Welsh rugby player
- Brian Williams (basketball) or Bison Dele (1969–2002), American basketball player
- Brian Williams (baseball) (born 1969), American baseball pitcher

=== Other people ===
- Brian Williams (director), Irish-born London-based designer turned creative advertising director
- Brian Williams (illustrator) (1956–2010), British illustrator of the later Lone Wolf gamebooks
- Brian Williams (Missouri politician) (born 1983), member of the Missouri Senate
- Brian Williams (Ohio politician) (born 1942), former member of the US state of Ohio's House of Representatives
- Brian Williams (surgeon) (born 1969), American surgeon
- Lustmord (Brian Williams, born 1964), British dark ambient musician
- Brian Glyn Williams, American professor of Islamic history
- Brian Williams (bishop), Argentine Anglican bishop

== Fictional characters ==
- Brian Williams, father of fictional character Rory Williams in the television series Doctor Who
- Smash Williams (Brian Williams), a fictional character in the television series Friday Night Lights

== See also ==
- Bryan Williams (disambiguation)
