= Blood Runs Cold =

Blood Runs Cold may refer to:

- Blood Runs Cold, a 2008 novel by Alex Barclay
- "Blood Runs Cold", a song by Jedi Mind Tricks from the 2000 album Violent by Design
- "Blood Runs Cold", a song by Def Leppard from the 1996 album Slang

== See also ==
- My Blood Runs Cold, a 1965 American thriller
