= Dark House =

Dark House may refer to:

== Film ==
- Dark House (2009 film), an American horror film directed by Darin Scott
- The Dark House (2009 Polish film), a horror film directed by Wojciech Smarzowski
- The Dark House (2009 Dutch film), a thriller directed by Will Koopman
- Dark House (2014 film), an American horror film directed by Victor Salva

== Other uses ==
- Darkhouse, a 2005 novel by Alex Barclay
- Darkhouse (fishing) or ice shanty, a portable shelter for ice fishing
