= Harper (publisher) =

American publishing company

Harper Books
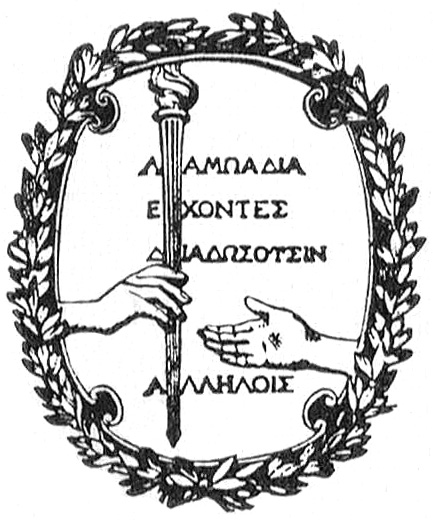
- Coat of arms of Harper, with quote from Plato's Republic (Note: Ancient Greek: ΛΑΜΠΑΔΙΑ ἜΧΟΝΤΕΣ ΔΙΑΔΏΣΟΥΣΙΝ ἈΛΛΉΛΟΙΣ (LAMPADIA ECHONTES DIADOSOUSIN ALLELOIS; roughly, 'Bearing torches, they will pass them to others'))
- Parent company: HarperCollins
- Founded: March 6, 1817; 209 years ago (as J. & J. Harper)
- Founder: James Harper; John Harper
- Headquarters location: New York City, U.S.
- Owner: News Corp

Harper is an American publishing house, the flagship imprint of global publisher HarperCollins, based in New York City. Founded in New York in 1817 by James Harper and his brother John, the company operated as J. & J. Harper until 1833, when it changed its name to Harper & Brothers, reflecting the inclusion of Joseph and Fletcher Harper. Harper began publishing Harper's Magazine, Harper's Weekly, and other periodicals beginning in the 1850s. From 1962 to 1990, the company was known as Harper & Row after its merger with Row, Peterson & Company. Harper & Row was purchased in 1987 by News Corporation and combined with William Collins, Sons, its United Kingdom counterpart, in 1990 to form HarperCollins, although the Harper name has been used in its place since 2007.

== History ==
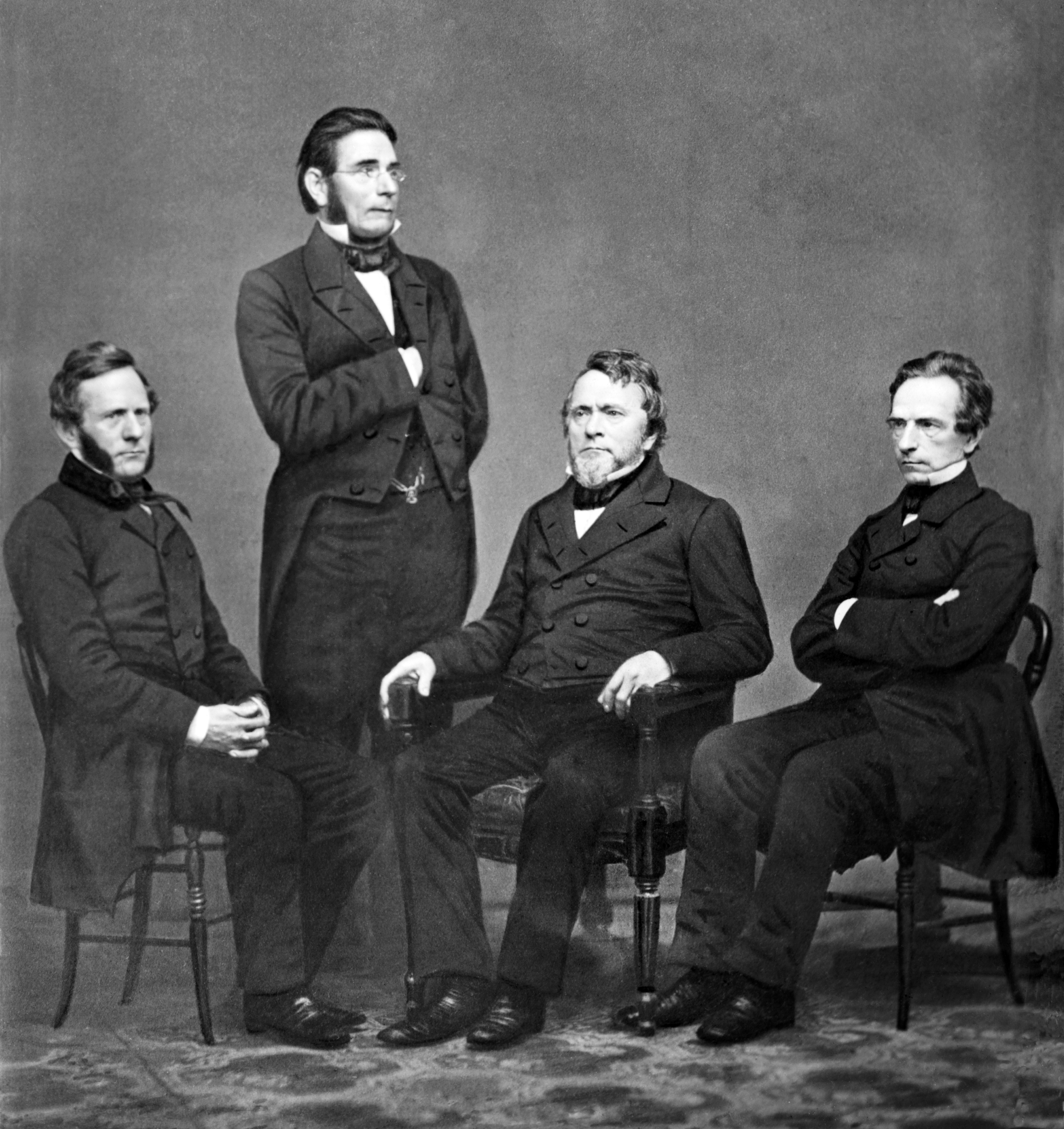
A group portrait of the four Harper brothers by Mathew Brady, c. 1860. Left to right: Fletcher, James, John, and Joseph

=== J. & J. Harper (1817–1833) ===
James Harper and his brother John, printers by training, started their book publishing business, J. & J. Harper, in New York City in 1817. Their two brothers, Joseph Wesley and Fletcher, joined them in the mid-1820s.

=== Harper & Brothers (1833–1962) ===
The company changed its name to "Harper & Brothers" in 1833. The headquarters of the publishing house was located at 331 Pearl Street, facing Franklin Square in Lower Manhattan near the present-day Manhattan approach to the Brooklyn Bridge.

Harper & Brothers began publishing Harper's New Monthly Magazine in New York City, in 1850. The brothers also published Harper's Weekly (starting in New York City in June 1857), Harper's Bazar (starting in New York City on November 2, 1867), and Harper's Young People (starting in New York City in 1879).

George B. M. Harvey became president of Harper's on November 16, 1899.

Harper's New Monthly Magazine ultimately became Harper's Magazine, now published by the Harper's Magazine Foundation. Harper's Weekly was absorbed by The Independent (New York; later Boston) in 1916, which merged with The Outlook in 1928. Harper's Bazar was sold to William Randolph Hearst in 1913, became Harper's Bazaar, and is now simply Bazaar, published by the Hearst Corporation.

In 1924, Cass Canfield joined Harper & Brothers and held various executive positions until he died in 1986. In 1925, Eugene F. Saxton joined the company as an editor, and he was responsible for publishing many well-known authors, including Edna St. Vincent Millay and Thornton Wilder. In 1935, Edward Aswell moved to Harper & Brothers as an assistant editor of general books and eventually became editor-in-chief. Aswell persuaded Thomas Wolfe to leave Scribner's, and, after Wolfe's death, edited the posthumous novels, The Web and the Rock, You Can't Go Home Again, and The Hills Beyond.

=== Harper & Row (1962–1990) ===
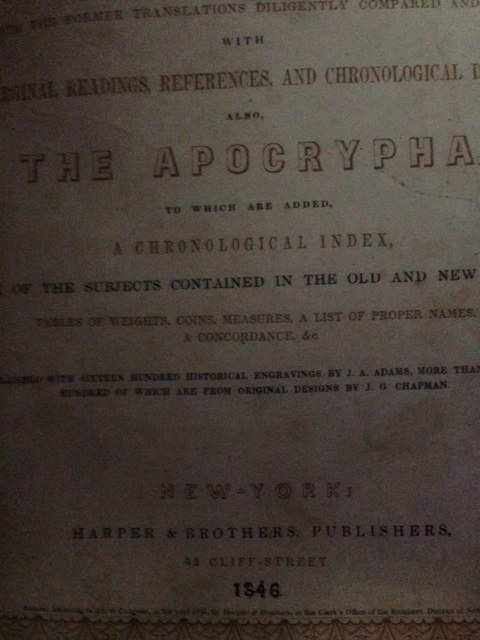
Harper's Illuminated Bible, published in 1846

In 1962, Harper & Brothers merged with Row, Peterson & Company to become Harper & Row. Harper's religion publishing moved to San Francisco and became Harper San Francisco, which is now HarperOne, in 1977. Harper & Row acquired Thomas Y. Crowell Co. and J. B. Lippincott & Co. in the 1970s; Crowell and the trade operations of Lippincott were merged into Harper & Row in 1980. In 1988, Harper & Row purchased the religious publisher Zondervan, including subsidiary Marshall Pickering.

=== HarperCollins (1990–present) ===
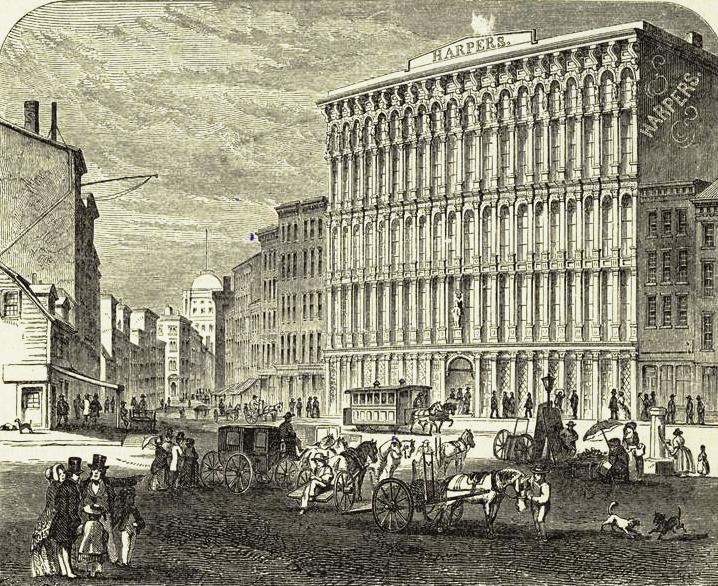
The Harper & Brothers building on Franklin Square, before 1867

Rupert Murdoch's News Corporation, now News Corp, acquired Harper & Row in 1987, and William Collins, Sons in 1990. The names of these two national publishing houses, Harper & Row in the United States and Collins in the United Kingdom, were combined along with the Harper's torch icon and Collins' fountain icon to create HarperCollins. The company has since expanded its international reach with further acquisitions of formerly independent publishers. The Harper imprint began being used in place of HarperCollins in 2007.

== Paperbacks ==
After the purchase of Harper & Row by News Corporation, HarperCollins launched a new mass-market paperback line to complement its existing trade paperback Perennial imprint. It was known as Harper Paperbacks from 1990 to 2000, HarperTorch from 2000 to 2006, and Harper from 2007 to the present.

== Notable authors and illustrators ==
- Robert C. Binkley
- Margaret Wise Brown
- Gwendolyn Brooks
- Agatha Christie
- Paulo Coelho
- Arthur Conan Doyle
- A. B. Frost
- Stephen Fry
- Anna Godbersen
- John Gray
- Zane Grey
- John Gunther
- Thomas Hardy
- Syd Hoff
- Arthur Holmes
- Erin Hunter
- Aldous Huxley
- Henry James
- Crockett Johnson
- Bruce Judson
- Jiddu Krishnamurti
- Harper Lee
- Martin Luther King Jr.
- Barbara Kingsolver
- Ruth Krauss
- Ursula K. Le Guin
- Armistead Maupin
- André Maurois
- Herman Melville
- Caroline Pafford Miller
- Peter G. Miller
- Dick Morris
- Sarah Palin
- Lincoln Peirce
- Howard Pyle
- Leland M. Roth
- Laura Schlessinger
- Maurice Sendak
- Sara Shepard
- Shel Silverstein
- Betty Smith
- Lemony Snicket
- Howard Spring
- Pierre Teilhard de Chardin
- Mark Twain
- Charles Dudley Warner
- E. B. White
- Simon Winchester
- Laura Ingalls Wilder
- Thornton Wilder
- Richard Wright

== See also ==
- Books in the United States
- Brooks Thomas
- Cyclopædia of Biblical, Theological and Ecclesiastical Literature
- Harper & Row v. Nation Enterprises
- The Long Short Cut
