= Milleens =

Irish farmhouse cheese brand

Milleens is an Irish farmhouse cheese, made on a farm on the outskirts of Eyeries, County Cork, Ireland.

First made in 1976, Milleens was originally produced by Norman and Veronica Steele, and is now produced by their son. Milleens cheese matures within four to ten weeks after it is produced. It is sold in large and small rounds - the latter called "dotes" - and with a washed rind.

In 1997, it was the winner of the Supreme Champion at the British Cheese Awards held at Chelsea Barracks.
