= Eoghan Daltun =

Irish sculptor, farmer, rewilding advocate and author

Eoghan Daltun (born 1967) is an Irish, Italian-trained, sculptor and sculpture conservator, and farmer, also notable for his work on, and advocacy for, rewilding. He is the author of a book on his personal rewilding work outside Eyeries on the Beara peninsula.

== Early life and education ==
Daltun was born in London in 1967, and his parents brought him to live in Dublin at the age of 5. His mother was from Knysna, Western Cape, South Africa. He grew up primarily in Rathmines and was educated at The High School, Dublin in Rathgar, and Rathmines Senior College. He then moved to London, learning, among other crafts, how to weld.

== Career ==
=== Early stages ===
Returning to Dublin, Daltun worked as a cycle courier, bought a site with a ruined cottage in Kilmainham, and also spent time in Paris and Prague, teaching English as a foreign language.

Daltun then moved to Carrara in Italy, where he studied sculpture for 7 years, including a 9-month intensive course in marble and general stone carving at the Scuola del Marmo and a second 9-month course in carving at Nicoli Sculpture Studios, followed by a four-year course in Sculpture Conservation and Restoration at the Accademia di Belle Arti di Carrara. While in Carrara he married Giuliana, and they had a child. They and a stepson moved back to Dublin, where he continued to restore and expand his Kilmainham house, while he performed sculpture conservation commissions. He also pursued an M.Litt. by research in Art History at Trinity College Dublin.

=== Farm and rewilding ===
He moved the family to a farm of 33 acres, with shares of two blocks totalling 40 acres of commonage, outside Eyeries, in 2009, working on housing and the land over the following years. The farm comprised a mix of terrain, some parts being very wild, some rich with streams. He discovered a wide range of native trees, and facilitated their growth, not least with fencing off the area to protect it from tree-damaging animals, such as sika deer and goats. With fencing in place, he observed the native forest regenerating, in the form of a temperate rainforest, with epiphytes on many trees. He maintains the greater part of the farm in a rewilding state, while managing other parts as a "High Nature Value" (HNV) farm.

His book on the rewilding project won the Lifestyle Book of the Year award at the An Post Irish Book Awards in 2022.

In 2024, he also contributed a chapter to the rewilding anthology Great Misconceptions, edited by Ian Parsons.

==== Conservation work ====
Sculpture conservation projects handled by Daltun include works on a 17th-century marble Madonna at the cathedral of Carrara Cathedral in 2001, recarving of a missing cartouche on a monument at Christ Church Cathedral in Dublin and work on 12th century entrances to St Brendan's Cathedral in Clonfert and St Lachtain's Church, Freshford, County Kilkenny. He also performed conservation work on the collection of 5th-7th century ogham stones, and Bronze Age marked stones at University College Cork, restoration on the graves of Seán T. O’Ceallaigh at Glasnevin Cemetery, and work on a set of 19th century limestone panels at the Pearse Museum in Rathfarnham. In 2010, after his move to south-western Ireland, he worked on a substantial collection of medieval sculpture on Garinish Island. He also prepared reports on the condition on a range of monuments.
