= Domicilium Decoratus =

- Limited edition cover
- Author: Kelly Wearstler
- Subject: Interior design
- Publisher: HarperCollins
- Publication date: 2006
- ISBN: 978-0061143939
- Preceded by: Modern Glamour

Domicilium Decoratus: Hillcrest Estate, Beverly Hills, California is a 2006 book on interior design by noted designer Kelly Wearstler, featuring her own home in Beverly Hills, California as the subject of the book.

== History ==
HarperCollins published Kelly Wearstler's Domicilium Decoratus in 2006, a style book featuring photographs of her Beverly Hills mansion and herself dressed in evening gowns.

== Reception ==
David Colman of The New York Times described it as "a kind of lavish brochure for Ms. Wearstler's vision (she has a fabric line and has carpet, furniture and china lines in the works), which involves a decadent Hollywood riposte to Martha Stewart's stolidly tasteful East Coast domesticity."

== See also ==
- The Decoration of Houses
