= The Secret Zoo =

Novel series by Bryan Chick

- Author: Bryan Chick
- Language: English
- Genre: Adventure; Fantasy Children's - Young Adult
- Publisher: Harper-Collins
- Published: 2010–2023
- No. of books: 6
- Website: https://bryanchick.com

The Secret Zoo is a series of children's novels by American author Bryan Chick.

== Background ==
When he was nine years old, Bryan Chick went to the zoo in Detroit and wondered what would happen if the exhibits had secret doors that allowed children to go inside and the animals to come outside, and thus, The Secret Zoo was created. Chick began work on the first novel in the series in 2007 and it was published in June 2010. A box set of the series was released in August 2014.

== Premise ==
Set in the fictional town of Clarksville, United States, the Clarksville Zoo is not all it seems. Four kids: Noah Nowicki, his sister Megan, and their friends Richie and Ella live across the street from the zoo. One night they notice strange things going on at the zoo from their treehouse and decide to explore it. Here they find that there is a magical secret society that they become a part of where humans and animals can live together equally.

== Chronology ==
No.	Title	Publication Date	ISBN
1	The Secret Zoo	June 1, 2010	9780061987519
Something strange is happening at the Clarksville City Zoo. Noah, his sister Megan, and their best friends, Richie and Ella, live next door to the zoo. Megan is the first to notice the puzzling behavior of some of the animals. One day Megan disappears, and her brother and their friends realize it's up to them to find her. Their only choice is to follow a series of clues and sneak into the zoo. But once inside, they discover there's much more to the Clarksville City Zoo than they could ever have guessed...
2	The Secret Zoo: Secrets and Shadows	February 1, 2011	9780061989254
Noah and his friends thought they had seen it all during their first journey into the Secret Zoo—but it was only the beginning. Now they must train to become Crossers, members of a secret society who freely travel to the Secret Zoo and back, helping to defend its borders. But now that the monstrous sasquatches are on the loose and the evil Shadowist is plotting destruction, will Noah, Megan, Ella, and Richie have what it takes to survive?
3	The Secret Zoo: Riddles and Danger	September 27, 2011	9780061989278
Noah, Megan, Richie, and Ella are the Action Scouts; friends whose tree house overlooks the Clarksville City Zoo. When they discover a magical world hidden within the zoo, they are swept away on an adventure in which penguins can fly, a mysterious figure lurks in the shadows, and the scouts are enlisted to help Mr. Darby, who is in charge of the Secret Zoo. But when the dangerous sasquatches who have escaped the zoo pose a threat to their town, the four friends training as Crossers and the scouts must save the Secret Zoo.
4	The Secret Zoo: Traps and Specters	September 24, 2013	9780062192233
On Halloween night, Noah and his friends must battle terrifying sasquatches that have attacked their own elementary school. Little do they know the sasquatches are a trap! When DeGraff captures three of Noah's friends, it's up to the kids to team up with their rivals in order to save every person and animal in the zoo: all while dodging the town's police.
5	The Secret Zoo: Raids and Rescues	September 23, 2014	9780062192295
Ella, Noah, Richie, and Megan are in trouble—and so is the Secret Zoo! When the scouts' friends are held in the off-limits sector in the zoo, a never-ending maze of aquariums, Noah, Megan, Richie, and Ella must be at their most courageous.
6	The Secret Zoo: The Final Fight	February 28, 2023	9780063279278
In the final book in the series, when Noah and his friends discover tarantulas roaming around, they’re sure the bad omen can only mean one thing: the Shadowist is nearby. Closing the portals is the only option to save all the animals at Clarksville City Zoo... and Noah’s world. But when Mr. Darby and the Descenders are unsuccessful in destroying the portals, Noah realizes that the Secret Zoo is going to war.

== Reception ==
The series has received positive reviews. A reviewer from TheReadingTub praised book 1 of the series, calling it "a nice choice for reading aloud with a younger crowd". Publishers Weekly called it "an action-packed and breathless story about teamwork. (The) story should appeal both to animal-lovers and a broader audience". Kirkus, in a review of Secrets and Shadows, said that "while the tension between the preteen protagonists and the teens is both tangible and interesting, this installment feels more like novel-length worldbuilding than a story in itself."
