= Veronica Steele =

Irish artisan cheesemaker

- Born: Veronica Barron; 26 November 1947; Dublin
- Died: 4 January 2017 (aged 69); County Cork
- Occupations: Cheesemaker; businesswoman

Veronica Barron Steele (26 November 1947 – 4 January 2017) was an Irish artisan cheesemaker from Eyeries, West Cork. She created Milleens cheese, "Ireland's first modern farmhouse cheese".

== Career ==
Steele earned a degree in philosophy from University College Dublin. She pioneered the homegrown Irish artisan cheese industry in the 1970s, with the introduction of Milleens cheese, which achieved national attention when it was picked up by Declan Ryan for use in the Arbutus Lodge in Cork. She started cheese making on her Beara Peninsula farm, as a way to preserve excess milk, and to develop jobs in rural areas. She was influenced by John Ehle. "Any fool can make cheese," she later explained. "It takes genius to ripen it. You are dealing with an innocent-looking blob of mainly protein and fat, which is the favourite food of almost every beast that roams the face of the earth."

The Steeles were featured in a short documentary film, The Cheesemakers of Beara, televised in 1986. Steele was a founder and chair of CAÍS, the Association of Irish Farmhouse Cheesemakers. In 2000 she and Seamus Sheridan gave a workshop on Irish Farmhouse Cheese at the Salon de Gusto in Turin. The Steeles' herd was lost to bovine spongiform encephalopathy in 2001. She retired for health reasons in 2003, passing ownership of the Milleens production to her son Quinlan.

In 2016, she was honoured with a "Best of the Decade" Good Food Ireland Award. She also received the first Lifetime Achievement Award at the Irish Cheese Awards.

== Personal life ==
Veronica Barron, a Dublin native, was married to Sussex-born philosophy lecturer Norman Steele. They had four children. She suffered from multiple system atrophy later in life, and died in 2017, at the age of 69, at Bantry General Hospital.
