= Bryan Williams =

Bryan Williams may refer to:

- Bryan Williams (English footballer) (1927–2019), English footballer
- Bryan Williams (rugby union) (born 1950), former New Zealand rugby union footballer and coach
- Birdman (rapper) (born 1969), record executive, record producer, and rapper whose real name is Bryan Williams
- Bryan Williams (American football) (born 1987), NFL and AFL football player
- Bryan C. Williams, member of the Ohio Board of Education, and former member of the Ohio House of Representatives
- Bryan Williams (professor) (born 1949), molecular biologist
- Bryan Williams (Canadian lawyer), Canadian lawyer and judge
- Bryan Williams (priest) (1936–2005), Welsh Anglican priest
- David William (Bryan David Williams, 1926–2010), British/Canadian actor and artistic director

== See also ==
- Brian Williams (disambiguation)
