= Eyeries =

Village and area in western County Cork, Ireland

Eyeries Na hAoraí
- Village
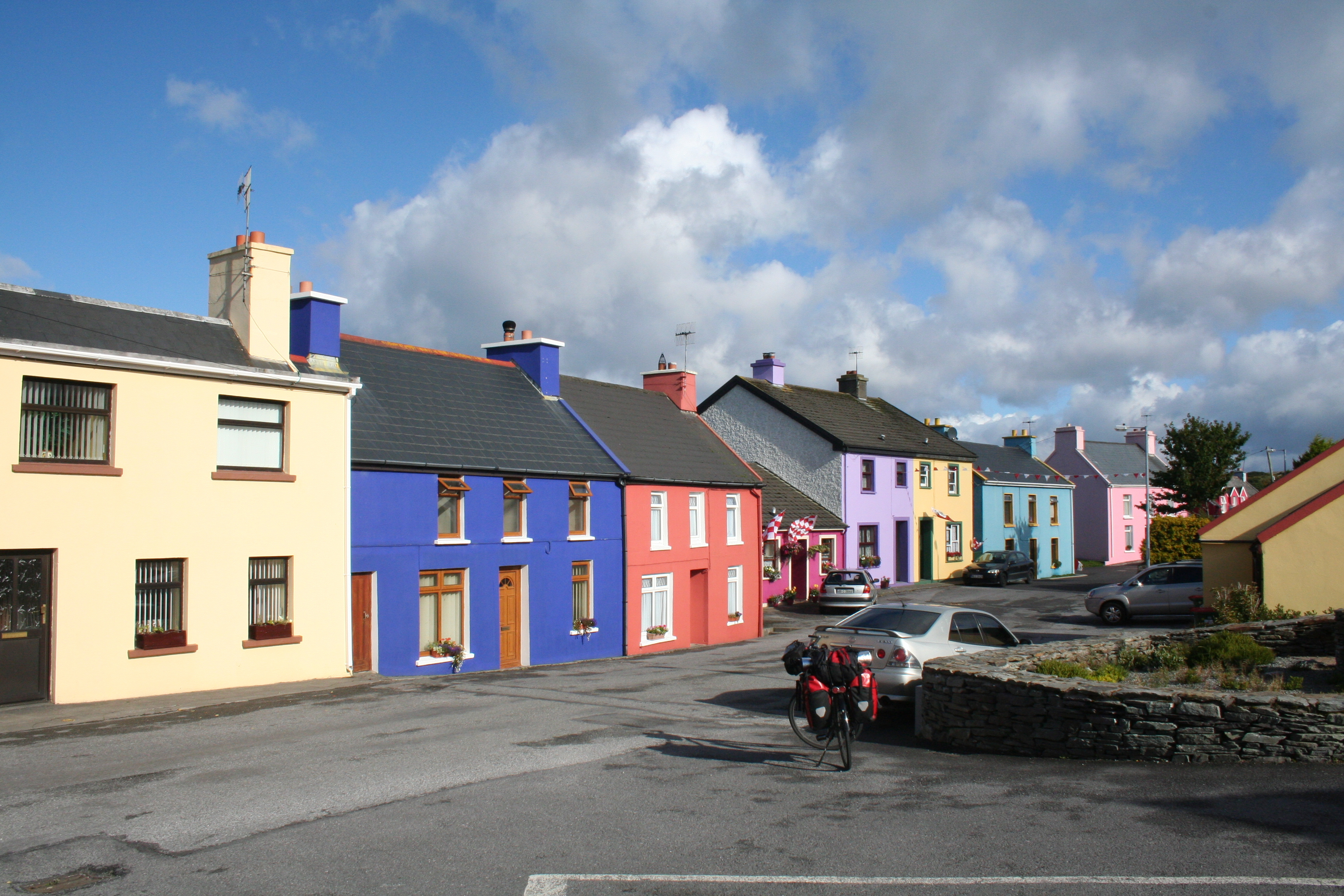
- Painted houses in Eyeries

- Location in Ireland
- Coordinates: 51°41′37″N 09°57′29″W
- Country: Ireland
- Province: Munster
- County: County Cork
- Time zone: UTC+0 (WET)
  - Summer (DST): UTC-1 (IST (WEST))

Eyeries (historically spelt as it is pronounced, Irees or Iries; Irish: Na hAoraí) is a village and its hinterland, on the Beara Peninsula in County Cork, Ireland, near the border with County Kerry. It lies at the foot of a hilly area, with a beach nearby, and is home to several retail and tourist businesses.

== Geography ==
One of the most south-westerly villages in Ireland, Eyeries sits on a bluff overlooking Coulagh Bay and the mouth of the Kenmare River (actually a bay), looking towards the Atlantic Ocean, halfway along the north coast of the Beara Peninsula. It lies at the base of Maulin, which, at 2,044 feet (623 m), is the highest peak in the small Slieve Miskish mountain range. The Eyeries area consists of the townland of the same name, and parts of other nearby townlands, and including the area called Eyeries Beg ("little Eyeries"). It lies near the county boundary between Cork and Kerry. Access is by road, with the village lying east of Allihies and Dursey Island, southwest of Ardgroom, and north of Castletown-Berehaven (Castletownbere), the main local centre. The R571 regional road passes through the area, and the village is just off it. There is a summer-only Bus Éireann service, and private bus companies also serve the area, some year-round.

Nearby, to the south, and passing along to the west, is the Kealincha River. The river is crossed by both old stone bridges and a modern footbridge.

Local activists formed a walk, the Eyeries Looped Walk, partly connected to the Beara Way, and later added information panels to form the Eyeries Eco Walk. The area also forms part of the Wild Atlantic Way coastal driving, cycling and walking route.

== Historical features ==
Nearby is the Ballycrovane Ogham stone, the tallest known, standing 17.5 feet (5.3 m) high and bearing the inscription 'MAQI DECCEDDAS AVI TURANIAS' which translates as "Mac Deich Uí Turainn" or "son of Deich the descendant of Turainn". About 2 km (1.2 mi) to the southwest is a ruined stone circle, sometimes Coulagh Stone Circle, and to the northeast, in the Ardgroom area, are two stone circles, one in good condition, one a remnant.

== Amenities ==
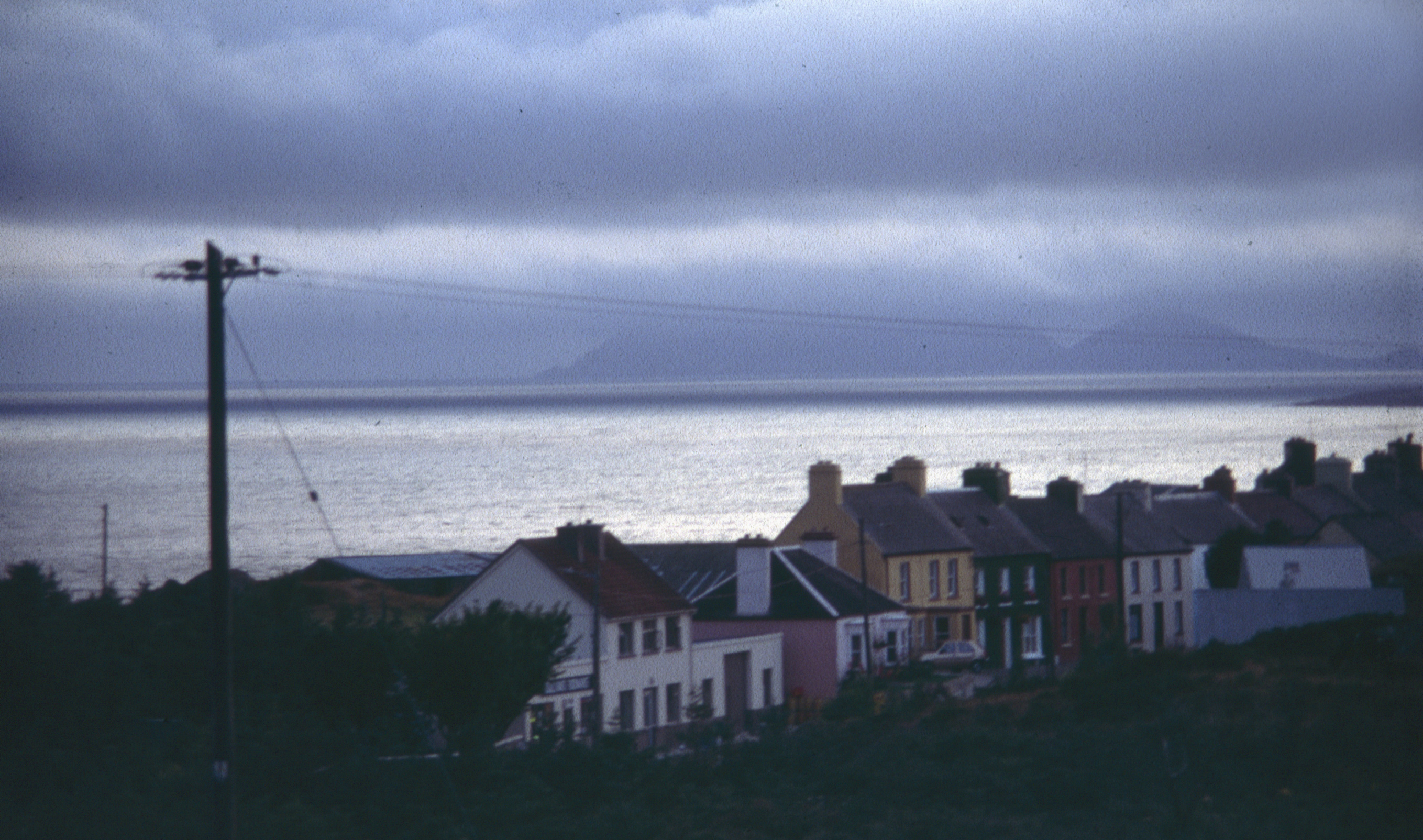
View of Eyeries and the coast

Eyeries is served by a Roman Catholic church, built 1823–1825, and named for Saint Kentigern. There is also a playground near the village centre, and another off the coast road to the southwest.

Pairc na hAorai, at the northern end of the village, is the home ground of Urhan GAA, named for a townland 3 km (1.9 mi) southwest of Eyeries.

There is a local Tidy Towns group, which has overseen efforts resulting in several awards in the annual Tidy Towns Competition, as well as the Best-Kept Village and Overall Winner awards in the all-island Best-Kept Places competition in 2012.

== Economy ==
The village has a range of holiday accommodation businesses, a post office and grocery store, a general store with a petrol pump, two pubs, one of which serves food, and a cafe, and a plant nursery. On its outskirts, opposite the graveyard at Cappaneil, is the Anam Cara Writer's and Artist's Retreat which has hosted hundreds of writers and artists since around 2000. A little further from the village centre is the Milleens Cheese operation, based on the farm, belonging to the Steele family, from which Ireland's first craft cheese came.

== In popular culture ==
Eyeries was the location for the shooting of the film The Purple Taxi (also Le Taxi Mauve, 1977) starring Fred Astaire, Peter Ustinov, and Charlotte Rampling, the 1998 TV series (from a Deirdre Purcell novel), Falling for a Dancer, and also a short TV movie Iníon an Fhiaclóra (Dentist's Daughter) directed by Jacqueline O'Neil who is local to the area.

== Notable people ==
- Alex Barclay, crime fiction writer
- Sue Booth-Forbes, literary and creative coach
- Eoghan Daltun, sculptor, conservator, rewilder and author who manages the Beara Rainforest outside the village
- Veronica Steele (1947–2017), first modern Irish artisan cheesemaker

== See also ==
- List of towns and villages in Ireland
