= The Gollywhopper Games =

2008 novel by Jody Feldman

- First edition cover
- Author: Jody Feldman
- Illustrator: Victoria Jamieson
- Language: English
- Publisher: Greenwillow Books
- Publication date: March 1, 2008
- Publication place: United States
- Media type: Print
- Pages: 332 pp
- ISBN: 0-06-121450-7

The Gollywhopper Games is a children's novel for readers aged 10 to 14. It was written by Jody Feldman and illustrated by Victoria Jamieson. It has been praised for its interactive games and puzzles. This is Feldman's first novel. It was published in March 2008 by Greenwillow Books, an imprint of HarperCollins Publishers.

== Overview ==
Gil Goodson is one of many contestants in the Golly Toy & Game Company's ultimate competition, the Gollywhopper Games. If he wins, his dad promises the family can move out of Orchard Heights—away from all the gossip, and the false friends, and start a new life away from the bad press that has plagued the Goodsons ever since "The Incident". His friends have ditched him, but, he can start over if he wins. Is he ready to begin the wildest most memorable ride of his life?

== Reception ==
Numerous reviewers have praised the novel and its interactive games and puzzles. Publishers Weekly said that "the appeal of the book lies in the puzzles, which involves unscrambling clues hidden in rhyming verses and tackling various stunts (obstacle courses, mazes, scavenger hunts) that get increasingly difficult as the field is winnowed". Kirkus Reviews compares it to Eric Berlin's The Puzzling World of Winston Breen (2007) and Roald Dahl's Charlie and the Chocolate Factory' (Knopf, 1964) series.

== Recognition ==
The Gollywhopper Games is an American Library Association/Young Adult Library Services Association Best Books for Young Adult nominated book.

It was also chosen as a Book Sense Pick, Spring 2008 selection and a Booksense "Book to Watch."

It also is a Texas Bluebonnet nominee and a Florida Sunshine State Reader.
