= Harper's Weekly =

American political magazine

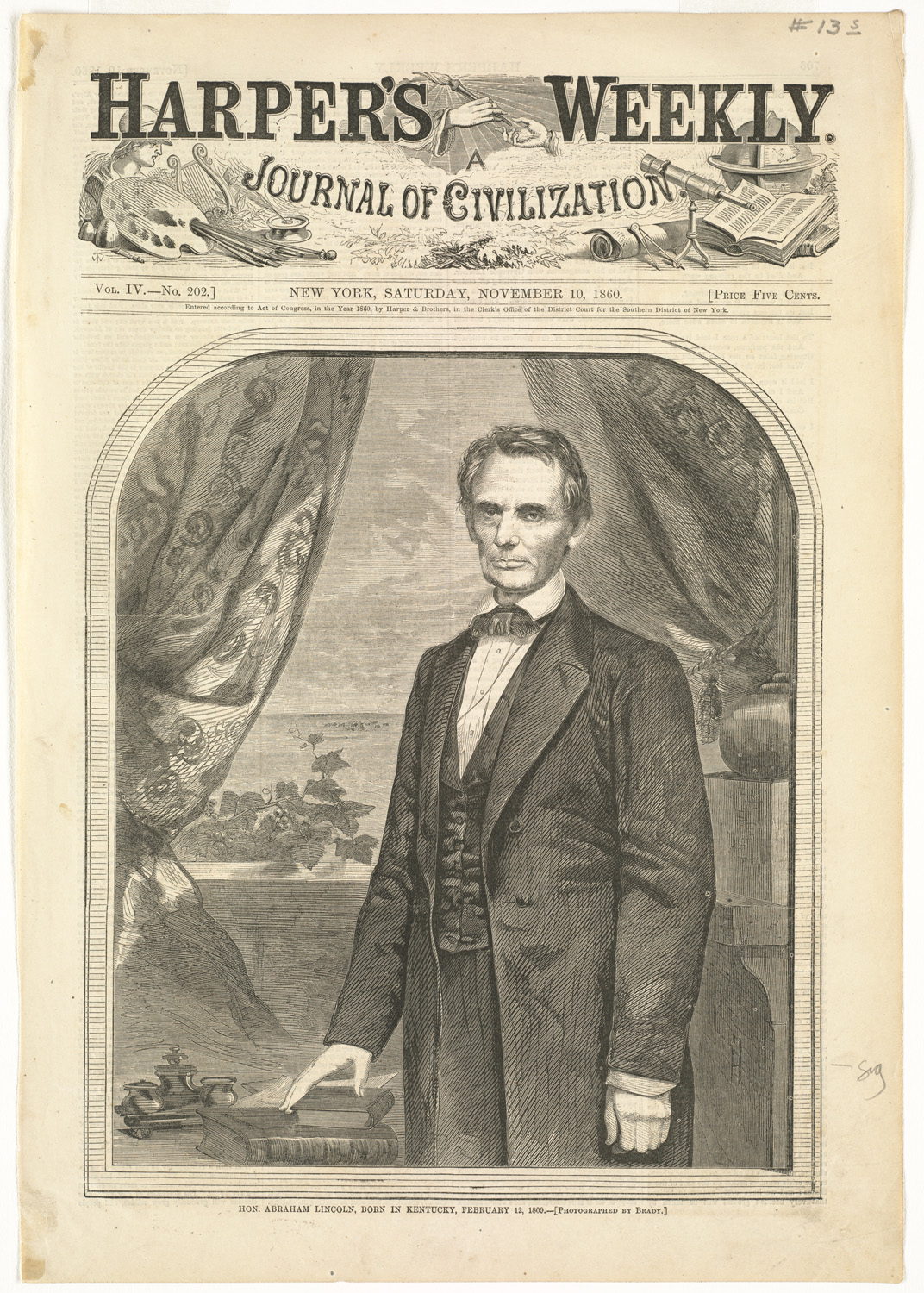
- The November 10, 1860 cover of Harper's Weekly, featuring an illustration of President-elect Abraham Lincoln by Winslow Homer and Mathew Brady
- Illustrators: Winslow Homer; Livingston Hopkins; Thomas Nast; Granville Perkins; Theodore R. Davis
- Categories: News, politics
- Frequency: Weekly
- Founder: Fletcher Harper
- Founded: 1857
- First issue: January 3, 1857
- Final issue: May 13, 1916; 110 years ago
- Company: Harper & Brothers
- Country: United States
- Based in: New York City, New York, U.S.
- Language: English

Harper's Weekly, A Journal of Civilization was an American political magazine based in New York City. Published by Harper & Brothers from 1857 until 1916, it featured foreign and domestic news, fiction, essays on many subjects, and humor, alongside illustrations. It carried extensive coverage of the American Civil War, including many illustrations of events from the war. During its most influential period, it was the forum of the political cartoonist Thomas Nast.

== History ==
=== Inception ===
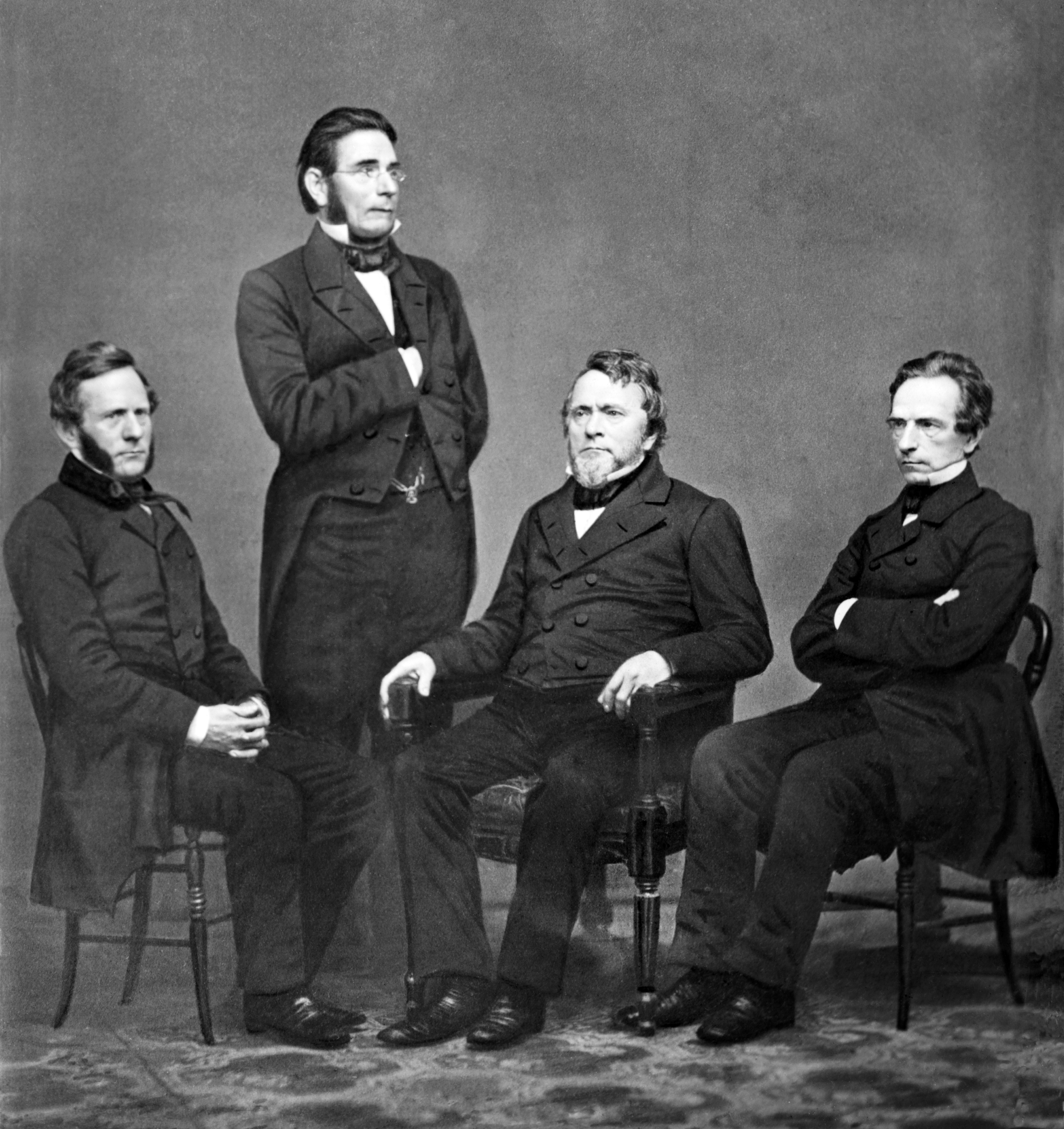
The four founders of Harper & Brothers: Fletcher, James, John, and Joseph Wesley Harper in 1860

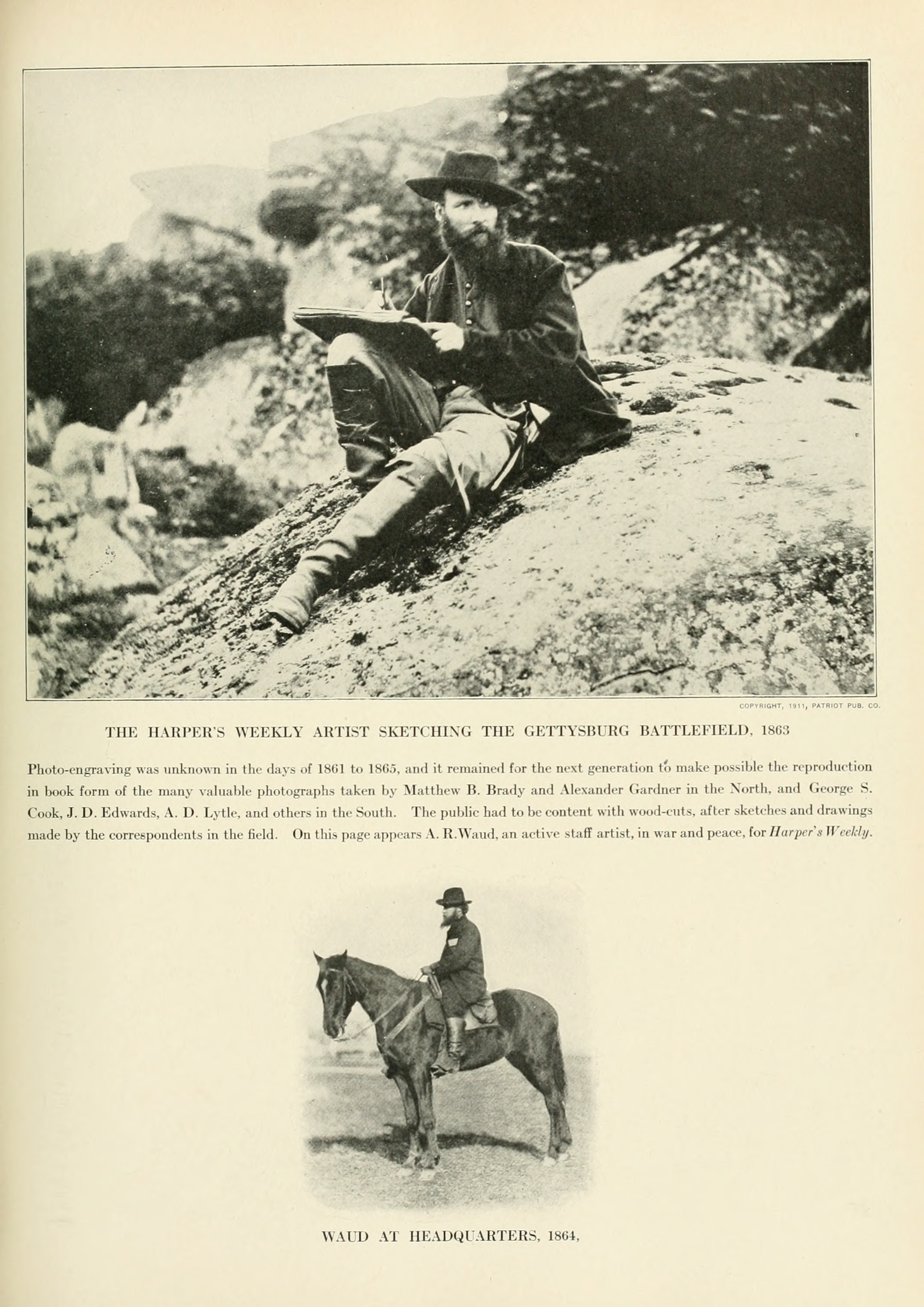
Harper's Weekly artist Alfred Waud sketching the Gettysburg battlefield, the bloodiest and most decisive battle of the American Civil War

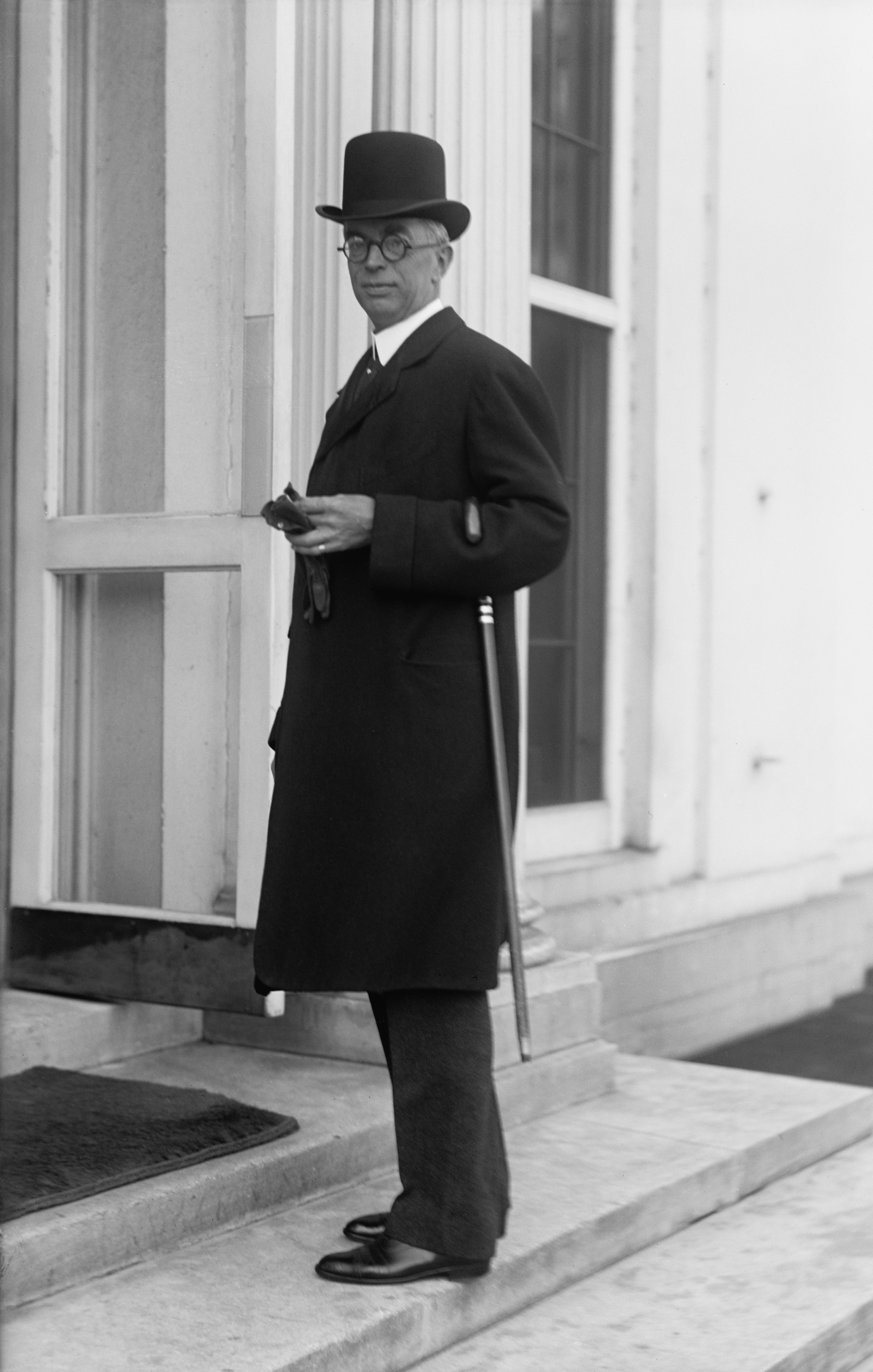
George Harvey, the magazine's editor from 1901 until 1913

Along with his brothers James, John, and Wesley, Fletcher Harper began the publishing company Harper & Brothers in 1825. Following the successful example of The Illustrated London News, Harper started publishing Harper's Magazine in 1850. The monthly publication featured established authors such as Charles Dickens and William Makepeace Thackeray, and within several years, demand for the magazine was great enough to sustain a weekly edition.

In 1857, his company began publishing Harper's Weekly in New York City. By 1860, the circulation of the Weekly had reached 200,000. Illustrations were an important part of the Weekly's content, and it developed a reputation for using some of the most renowned illustrators of the time, notably Winslow Homer, Granville Perkins, Porte Crayon, and Livingston Hopkins.

Among the recurring features were the political cartoons of Thomas Nast, who was recruited in 1862 and worked with the Weekly for more than 20 years. Nast was a feared caricaturist, and is often called the father of American political cartooning. He was the first to use an elephant as the symbol of the Republican Party. He also drew the legendary character of Santa Claus; his version became strongly associated with the figure, who was popularized as part of Christmas customs in the late nineteenth century.

=== Civil War coverage ===
Harper's Weekly was the most widely read journal in the United States during the American Civil War era of the mid-19th century. Harper's took a moderate editorial position on the issue of slavery prior to the Civil War's outbreak in 1861, earning it the label "Harper's Weakly" by critics.

=== 19th century ===
During the 1860 U.S. presidential campaign, the magazine supported Stephen A. Douglas in his campaign against Abraham Lincoln. But as the American Civil War broke out, the magazine fully supported Lincoln and the Union. A July 1863 article in The Weekly on the escaped slave Gordon included an illustration taken from a photograph of his back, severely scarred from whippings. The image provided many readers in the North their first visual evidence of slavery's brutality. The image and story inspired many free blacks in the North to enlist in the Union Army.

Many of the most important articles and illustrations in Harper's were related to the American Civil War. Besides illustrations by Homer and Nast, the magazine published illustrations by Theodore R. Davis, Henry Mosler, and the brothers Alfred and William Waud.

Beginning in 1863 until his death in 1892, George William Curtis, one of the founders of the Republican Party, served as the magazine's political editor. His editorials advocated civil service reform, low tariffs, and adherence to the gold standard.

=== President maker ===
After the end of the Civil War, Harper's Weekly more openly supported the Republican Party in its editorial positions, and supported the presidential candidacy of Ulysses S. Grant in 1868 and again in 1872. It supported the Radical Republican position on Reconstruction. In the 1870s, the cartoonist Thomas Nast began an aggressive campaign in the journal against the corrupt New York political leader William "Boss" Tweed. Nast turned down a $500,000 bribe to end his attack. Tweed was arrested in 1873 and convicted of fraud.

Nast and Harper's also played an important part in securing Rutherford B. Hayes' 1876 presidential election. Later on Hayes remarked that Nast was "the most powerful, single-handed aid [he] had". After the election, Nast's role in the magazine diminished considerably. Since the late 1860s, Nast and George W. Curtis had frequently differed on political matters and particularly on the role of cartoons in political discourse. Curtis believed that mockery by caricature should be reserved for Democrats, and did not approve of Nast's cartoons assailing Republicans such as Carl Schurz and Charles Sumner, who opposed policies of the Grant administration. Harper's publisher Fletcher Harper strongly supported Nast in his disputes with Curtis. In 1877, Harper died, and his nephews, Joseph W. Harper Jr. and John Henry Harper, assumed control of the magazine. They were more sympathetic to Curtis' arguments for rejecting cartoons that contradicted his editorial positions.

In 1884, however, Curtis and Nast agreed that they could not support the Republican candidate James G. Blaine, whose association with corruption was anathema to them. Instead they supported the Democratic candidate, Grover Cleveland. Nast's cartoons helped Cleveland become the first Democrat to be elected president since 1856. In the words of the artist's grandson, Thomas Nast St Hill, "it was generally conceded that Nast's support won Cleveland the small margin by which he was elected. In his last national political campaign, Nast had, in fact, 'made a president.'"

Nast's final contribution to Harper's Weekly was his Christmas illustration in December 1886. Journalist Henry Watterson said that "in quitting Harper's Weekly, Nast lost his forum: in losing him, Harper's Weekly lost its political importance." Nast's biographer Fiona Deans Halloran says "the former is true to a certain extent, the latter unlikely. Readers may have missed Nast's cartoons, but Harper's Weekly remained influential."

On January 14, 1893, Harper's Weekly became the first American magazine to publish a Sherlock Holmes story, "The Adventure of the Cardboard Box".

=== 20th century ===
After 1900, Harper's Weekly devoted more print to political and social issues, and featured articles by some of the more prominent political figures of the time, such as Theodore Roosevelt. Harper's editor George Harvey was an early supporter of Woodrow Wilson's candidacy, proposing him for the Presidency at a Lotos Club dinner in 1906. After that dinner, Harvey would make sure that he "emblazoned each issue of Harper's Weekly with the words 'For President—Woodrow Wilson'".

Roderic C. Penfield served as the managing editor of Harper's Weekly from 1912 to 1914. The magazine published its final issue on May 13, 1916. It was absorbed by The Independent, which in turn merged with The Outlook in 1928.

In the mid-1970s, Harper's Magazine used the Harper's Weekly title for a spinoff publication, which was published biweekly from its New York City headquarters and depended on contributions from readers for much of its content.

== See also ==
- Harper (publisher)
