= Brian Williams (Australian footballer) =

Australian rules footballer

Personal information
- Full name: Brian Williams
- Born: 14 September 1936
- Died: 19 January 2010 (aged 73)
- Original team: Camperdown
- Height: 185 cm (6 ft 1 in)
- Weight: 99 kg (218 lb)

Playing career^{1}
Years	Club	Games (Goals)
1963	Fitzroy	2 (0)
- ^{1} Playing statistics correct to the end of 1963.

Brian Williams (14 September 1936 – 19 January 2010) was a former Australian rules footballer who played with Fitzroy in the Victorian Football League (VFL).
