= James Harper (publisher) =

American publisher and politician (1795–1869)

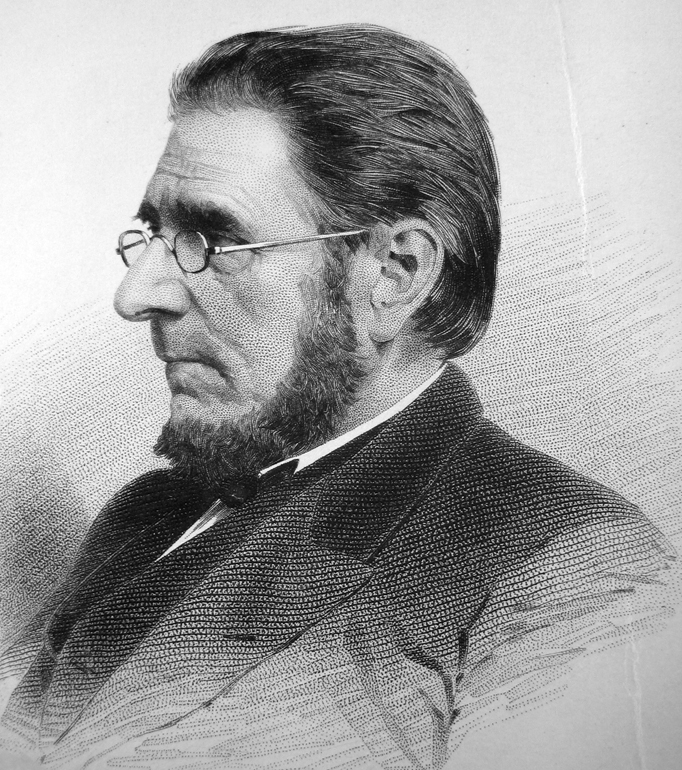
- Engraving of James Harper by Frederick Halpin (1805–1880); the photograph from which this portrait was drawn was taken two days before Harper's death in 1869.

66th Mayor of New York City
- In office 1844–1845
- Preceded by: Robert Morris
- Succeeded by: William F. Havemeyer

Personal details
- Born: April 13, 1795 Newtown, New York, US
- Died: March 27, 1869 (aged 73) New York City, US
- Party: American Republican (1843–1845)
- Profession: Publisher

James Harper (April 13, 1795 – March 27, 1869) was an American publisher and politician. Along with his brother John, Harper formed publishing company J. & J. Harper (now Harper) in 1817. He incorporated his brothers Joseph and Fletcher into the company in 1825, changing its name to Harper & Brothers.

Harper company's first successful publishing was Maria Monk's Awful Disclosures in 1836. Eight years later, Harper was elected as the 66th mayor of New York City. Beginning his term as mayor in 1844, he was defeated for reelection in April 1845. Outside of publishing and politics, Harper was a trustee of Vassar College until his death in 1869. Harper's company was later merged with another publisher to form Harper & Row in 1962 and HarperCollins in 1990 under the News Corporation banner.

== Childhood and starting in business ==
James Harper as a young man

Harper was born in Newtown, New York, on April 13, 1795, the eldest of four sons born to Joseph Henry Harper (1750-1838), a farmer, carpenter, and storekeeper, and Elizabeth Kolyer, daughter of Jacobus Kolyer (1749-1819) and Jane Miller. Harper's paternal grandfather was James Harper, who was born in Scotland and emigrated to Philadelphia, then settled in Newtown before the American Revolution, establishing himself as a teacher and farmer. As a child, he read The Autobiography of Benjamin Franklin, and decided that he would like to pursue a career as a printer because of Franklin's success in the field. An apprenticeship was subsequently arranged with a family friend, Abraham Paul, who was a partner in the New York print shop of Paul & Thomas. James' younger brother John (January 22, 1797 – April 22, 1875) began his printing apprenticeship at another printer in the city within two years.

In 1817, the two brothers learned what they could of the profession and felt ready to try their hand at running their own printing business. In 1817 the brothers founded J. & J. Harper in New York at the corner of Dover and Front streets; James was nearly 22, and John was 20. The business was supported by a loan from their father to purchase two Rampage printing presses, some typesetting stock, and simple binding equipment.

In 1817, Paul received an order from New York bookseller Evert Duyckinck for 2,000 copies of an English translation of Seneca's Morals ("Seneca's morals by way of abstract", translated by Roger L'Estrange and first published in England in 1678.) Paul gave the order to his young apprentices, James and John, who did the printing, working with their younger brothers Joseph Wesley (December 25, 1801 – February 14, 1870) and Fletcher (January 31, 1806 – May 29, 1877) who aided in setting type, and issued it under the imprint J. & J. Harper. This book was followed in 1818 with an edition of John Locke's An Essay Concerning Human Understanding (1818), which they issued under the J. & J. Harper imprint as a publisher rather than merely printer.

A description of Harper from this time can be found in Glyndon G. van Deusen's 1944 essay on Thurlow Weed, an acquaintance and fellow printer:

Harper was a big fellow with a prejudice against liquor, but with such a jovial nature that he became known among the hard-drinking printers as "the teetotaler who was never sober".

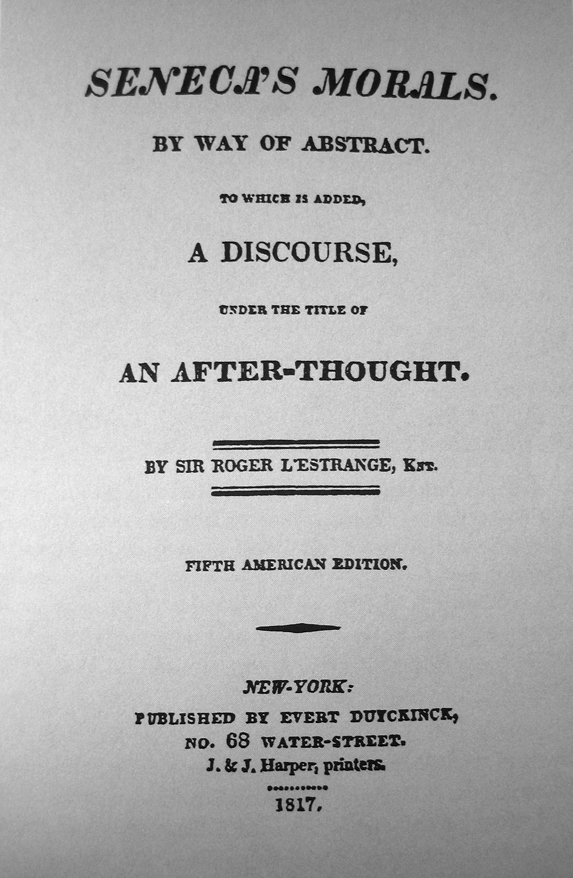
Seneca's Morals, 1817

== Publishing ==
James founded the printshop J. & J. Harper with his brother John in 1817. The name was changed to Harper & Brothers in 1825 when the two other brothers, Wesley & Fletcher Harper, joined the firm. With the name change, the company also broadened its printing business to include publishing services.

The firm's first big success was Maria Monk's Awful Disclosures (1836). Often described as the "Uncle Tom's Cabin of nativism", the book went on to sell 300,000 copies for Harper & Brothers. It was later disclosed that Theodore Dwight was the actual author of the work, though he claimed it was dictated. The book ostensibly told the story of a Canadian woman who claimed to have been a nun sexually exploited in her convent. The work was published during a time of extreme anti-Catholicism in the United States and was used by politicians and anti-Catholic activists to seed discontent and incite riots. In the words of the historian Ray Allen Billington, it became "the most influential single work of anti-Catholic propaganda in America's history".

Within eight years of the publication of Awful Disclosures, Harper was elected mayor of New York, running on a Know-Nothing, Nativist platform of anti-Catholicism and anti-immigration. Monk's book had a brief revival in the 1960s during John F. Kennedy's run for the presidency of the United States.

Harper & Brothers became Harper & Row in 1962 when the firm merged with Row, Petersen & Co. Following News Corporation's acquisition of Harper & Row in 1987, the company was merged with William Collins publishers in 1990, resulting in its current name, HarperCollins. HarperCollins had sales of US$1,162 million in 2004 and employed over 3,000 people worldwide.

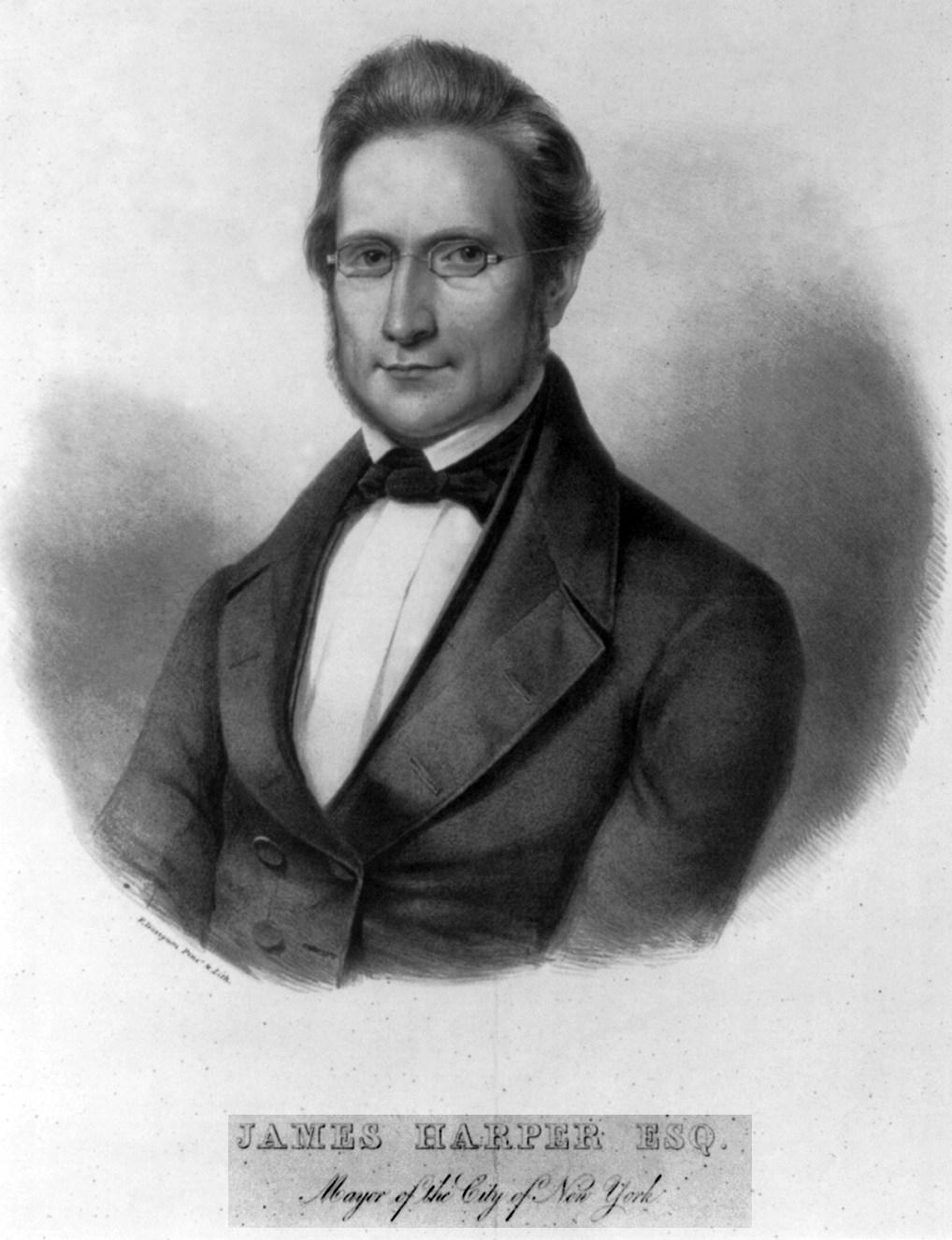
Official portrait of James Harper as New York Mayor in 1844

== Politics ==
In 1844, Harper was elected mayor of New York for a one-year term on the American Republican ticket, defeating Locofoco Party candidate Jonathan I. Coddington and Whig Morris Franklin. Harper won the election by 4,316 votes.

He reformed the city police force and established the first municipal police force in 1844, based on planning undertaken earlier by Peter Cooper. In-fighting between the city alderman delayed the full implementation of the reform plan, and Harper could only select 200 men for the force before voters ousted him in April 1845. He outfitted his "Harper's Police" in blue uniforms, which they felt made them targets of violence, and they lobbied successfully to wear street clothes. His successor William Havemeyer continued to reform the police force, successfully expanded the workforce to 800, and began the establishment of station houses.

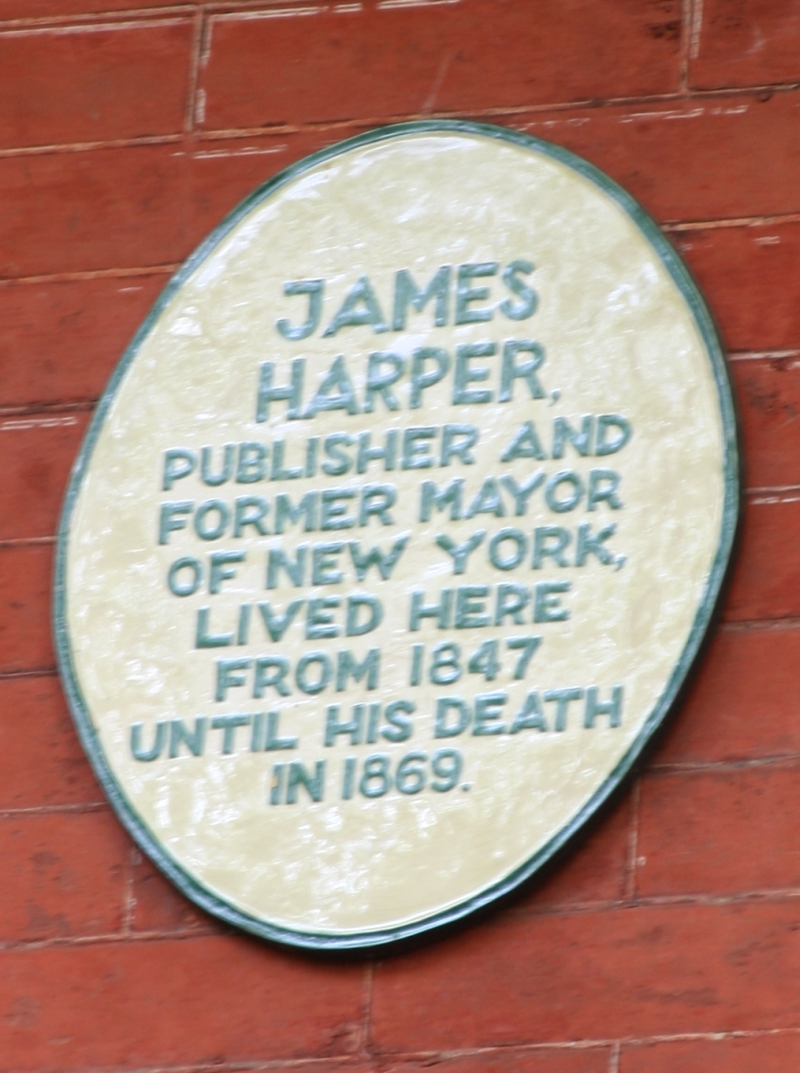
Plaque on 4 Gramercy Park

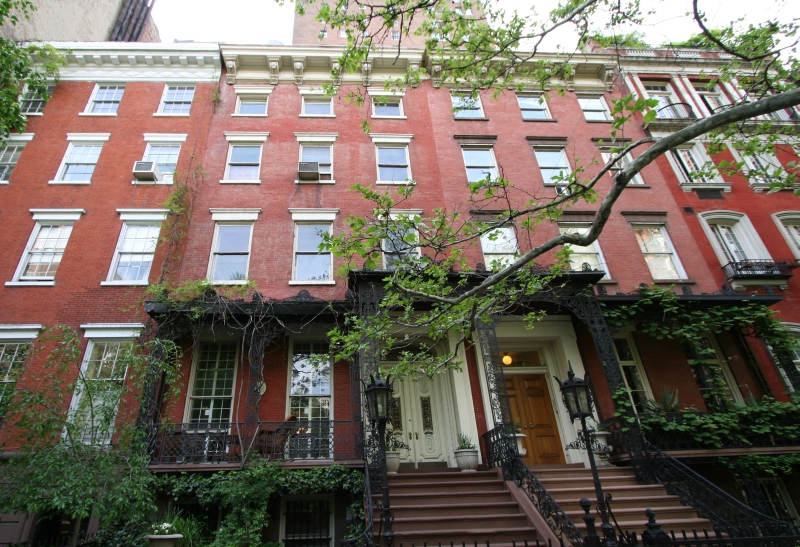
4 Gramercy Park

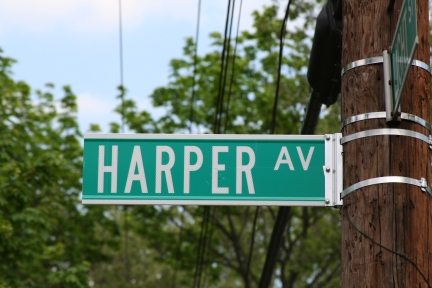
Harper Avenue street sign in the Bronx, NYC. This area of the Bronx features numerous streets named after city Mayors.

Harper banished free-roaming pigs from the streets of New York and began work on establishing a citywide sanitation system. He was subsequently put forward for the state's governorship, but he preferred to conduct his firm's business rather than enter public life.

== Residences ==
Harper lived at 50 Rose Street while he was mayor and later at No. 4 Gramercy Park West from 1847 until he died in 1869. The Gramercy Park house was built in the Greek Revival style and was designed by architect Alexander Jackson Davis.

== Later life and death ==
Harper was a trustee of Vassar College until he died on March 27, 1869, aged 73, in New York City. He is interred at Green-Wood Cemetery in Brooklyn.

== Legacy ==
Harper Avenue in The Bronx, New York City, is named in his honor.
