= Marshall Pickering =

- Predecessor: Marshall Morgan and Scott; Pickering and Inglis
- Founded: 1981
- Defunct: 2001
- Successor: Zondervan
- Country of origin: United Kingdom
- Publication types: Books
- Nonfiction topics: Christian literature

Marshall Pickering was a British book publisher that specialised in Christian literature. It was created in 1981 as a merger between two long-established Christian publishers and was acquired by Zondervan in 1983.

== History ==
The publisher was formed in 1981 from the merger of two long-established Christian publishers: Marshall Morgan and Scott, a London-based predominantly Baptist publishing house, which had acquired a number of publishing companies over the years, such as Bagsters (Bible publishers since 1794) and Oliphants; and Pickering and Inglis, a long-established Glasgow-based publisher, publishing largely for the nonconformist church in Scotland with many Brethren publications. Marshall Pickering was acquired by Zondervan in 1983.

Zondervan was bought by Harper & Row in 1988. In 1989, Collins was bought by Rupert Murdoch's News Corporation, and the publisher was combined with Harper & Row, which NewsCorp had acquired two years earlier, to form HarperCollins. Marshall Pickering was merged into Zondervan in 2001.
