= Fletcher Harper =

American publisher (1806–1877)

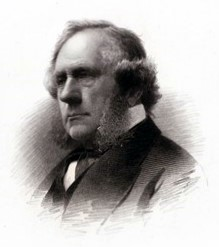
Fletcher Harper

Fletcher Harper (January 31, 1806 – May 29, 1877) was an American publisher in the early-to-mid 19th century. He and his brothers founded the Harper & Brothers publishing house.

== Biography ==
Fletcher Harper was born January 31, 1806, in Newtown, New York. He was the youngest of four sons born to Joseph Henry Harper, (1750–1838), a farmer, carpenter, and storekeeper, and Elizabeth Kollyer, a Dutch Burgher's daughter. With his brothers, James, John, and Joseph Wesley, he founded the Harper & Brothers publishing house. He is credited with founding Harper's Weekly (1850), Harper's Magazine (1850), and Harper's Bazaar (1867). Fletcher gave cartoonist Thomas Nast his start in Harper's Weekly, and gave Nast great editorial freedom. His newspaper Harper's Weekly rose to fame during the American Civil War because of Nast's depiction of the war. It was called by United States president Abraham Lincoln, "The greatest recruiter for the United States Military." Harper's Weekly was also responsible for publishing the first modern image of Santa Claus (drawn by Nast).

Harper died at his home in New York City on May 29, 1877. His paper lost influence after his death when his successor George William Curtis began putting restrictions on Nast, causing him to quit in 1886.
