= Brian Williams (director) =

Irish graphic designer and advert director

Brian Williams is an Irish graphic designer, developer of advertising commercials, and short film director. A graduate of Dublin Institute of Technology, Williams is a winner of multiple industry awards who has worked with U2, a number of TV stations and a range of major brands.

== Early life ==
Williams was born in Dublin, Ireland, and went to school at Oatlands College, a Christian Brothers school between Mount Merrion and Stillorgan. He then pursued studies in graphic design for print, TV and film at the College of Art and Design within the Dublin Institute of Technology, at Mountjoy Square. He graduated from the four year degree course in Advanced Visual Communications in 1991.

== Career ==
Williams was employed as a graphic designer by the agency Works Associates, led by Steve Averill. He worked with U2 on the 1992-1993 Zoo TV tour, and the 1993 Zooropa album linked to it, in particular leading the graphic design for the album, including the digital images and layout, but also some filming. His work with U2 lead to several awards.

He then moved to a new agency, Dynamo, as a partner, and creative director. In addition to his general work, within Dynamo he became founder and director of a TV-focused unit, Dynavision. During this period, Williams worked on channel "idents" for TG4, TV3 and the MTV Music Awards, and he won advertising industry awards in print, animation and live action work.

In 2004, Williams switched to freelancing as a writer and director of live action commercials, and working on motion graphics under the Super 68 trading brand, in both approaches working with different representation and production companies, including Butter Films, El Colony.

In 2006, Williams produced a video composition as part of a 15-year group retrospective exhibition for several members of his graduating class, opened by Alex Barclay.

Projects have included a number of live action ads for tyre-maker Bridgestone, promotional shorts for the Irish Road Safety Authority, and ads for Toyota, Coca-Cola, Bank of Ireland and the BBC / Children in Need, and a promotional video for the non-profit Ronald McDonald House of Chapel Hill. Further awards have been won from the European body EPICA, and from the Institute of Creative Advertising and Design.

Williams cites Syd Mead as a significant influence.

== Personal life ==
Williams married Yve Morris at Kilquiggan, Co. Wicklow, in 2000, and they settled in Sandymount on Dublin's coast. As of 2006 they were living in Ireland. Williams later relocated to London and in April 2018 he married Belinda Henriksen, a HR manager originally from Denmark, in a humanist ceremony at Dunmore East, Co. Waterford in Ireland. A son was born in 2019.
