= Darkhouse =

2005 novel by Alex Barclay

- Author: Alex Barclay
- Cover artist: First edition
- Language: English
- Genre: Thriller, crime, mystery fiction
- Publisher: HarperCollins (UK)
- Publication date: 2005 (UK)
- Publication place: United Kingdom
- Media type: Print (Hardback & Paperback)
- Pages: 390 (UK hardback edition)
- ISBN: 0-00-719539-7 (UK hardback edition)
- OCLC: 59352429
- Followed by: The Caller

Darkhouse is a 2005 mystery-detective novel written by Irish author Alex Barclay and published by HarperCollins in the United Kingdom, and later in the US, France and many other markets. It is the debut novel of pseudonymous former journalist Barclay and was both a Sunday Times and international best-seller.

== Plot summary ==
The novel kicks off in New York City with the abduction of a wealthy couple's young daughter. The girl's mother Elise Gray is being tailed by Detective Joe Lucchesi, his partner Danny Markey and two FBI agents. The kidnapper Donnie Riggs calls Elise and directs her to a park. He lets the girl, Hayley, out of his car and she runs to her mother. Elise discovers that Hayley is strapped with explosives as she embraces her, but she is too late as Riggs presses the detonator, killing them both. Joe pursues the kidnapper and guns him down. Two days later, in a Nevada prison, inmate Duke Rawlins is distraught to learn of the death of Donnie, his childhood friend.

One year passes and Joe Lucchesi has relocated to a small town in Ireland called Mountcannon with his interior designer wife Anna and sixteen-year-old son Shaun. Joe has taken temporary retirement from the force, Anna is renovating an old lighthouse and Shaun is dating a local girl called Katie Lawson. At first it seems that their family life is idyllic but Anna has a dark secret. She had a secret affair with local drunk John Miller, a man now embittered at his wife having moved to Australia with his children. Joe's turbulent relationship with his father, Giulio, is highlighted as he travels over to the States to attend his second marriage. Giulio clashes with Joe over his career choice and moving his family to Ireland. To make matters worse, Katie disappears from the area leaving Shaun deeply upset. Meanwhile, in a parallel subplot, Duke Rawlins has been travelling around Ireland and has reached Mountcannon.

An investigation is launched in Mountcannon into Katie's mysterious disappearance. Her devastated mother Martha insists that her daughter was a happy-go-lucky teenager with many friends and a caring boyfriend; she had no reason to go missing. Shaun comes under suspicion as he was the last person to see her; Joe himself cannot help but think that his son is hiding something and even looks for some sort of clues in his bedroom. Shaun becomes indignant at his father taking on the role of investigator and suspecting him of withholding information. Joe finds himself seeing red herrings everywhere in the community. He questions Shaun's friend Robert Harrington about a scratch on his hand, much to Shaun's annoyance. He also sees John Miller as a possible suspect. Anna in the meantime has to deal with Joe asking her awkward questions about her involvement with Miller.

The locals conduct a search of the surrounding area to no avail. Local Sergeant Frank Deegan, hotshot D.I. Myles O' Connor and fiery garda Richie Bates question Mae Miller, the elderly mother of John Miller and mentally challenged school caretaker Petey Grant amongst others but come no closer to the truth. Joe does his own investigating, retracing routes that Katie may have taken and asks questions, however, his theories are dismissed by Richie who tells him to stay out of the case.

After a number of weeks, Katie's decomposing body is discovered in the forest near Shore's Rock, the lighthouse where the Lucchesis live. The post mortem results reveal that Katie had been strangled and beaten with a blunt instrument. With the community baffled by the brutal murder of such a popular teenager, the Lucchesi family begin to fall apart. Shaun is inconsolable over his girlfriend's death and Anna becomes increasingly paranoid about what Joe knows. She confesses to him that she had been seeing John Miller while they were engaged which makes Joe furious. Meanwhile, the authorities are told to pay particular attention to Shaun and also to Joe who had been seen removing evidence from the murder scene. The night after Katie's funeral, one of the locals has an altercation with Duke Rawlins outside the bar and finds a hawk gold pin after Duke flees. He shows it to a shocked Joe who recognises it as being the same pin that Donnie Riggs had in his hand when he shot him.

Flashbacks to Donnie and Duke's childhood in Texas run concurrent to the main murder plot. They both grow up in Stinger's Creek and are inseparable. Duke is very close to his kindly Uncle Bill but has to deal with a lot of hardship in his life in the form of a drug addicted, promiscuous mother and the unwanted attentions of a paedophile. Donnie also has domestic strife as his father is a negligent alcoholic, while Duke's negative surroundings are moulding him into a deeply disturbed boy with a penchant for violence. At the age of fifteen the two boys make a chilling blood pact to remain loyal to one another until the end, a precursor to their later dastardly actions.

With Joe now convinced that Duke Rawlins is after him with revenge on his mind, he once again clashes with Richie Bates when he takes Petey Grant in for questioning over the murder. However, Petey reveals that he met Katie on the night of her death and that she had had a fight with Shaun, something which Shaun had earlier disputed. When he is interrogated by Richie and Frank Deegan he admits that a failed attempt at sexual intercourse had caused Katie to become upset and run away from him. Frank is shocked to discover, in the meantime, that his phone number was the last that Katie had dialled on the fateful night.

While researching Duke Rawlins, Joe discovers that Ogden Parnum, a former Police Chief from Stinger's Creek has committed suicide. Joe is intrigued to find that he was head of the unsolved Crosscut Killer investigation, an infamous serial killer who raped and murdered nine young women in Texas.

Across the Atlantic, Danny Markey questions the cellmate of Duke Rawlins, who reveals that Donnie was getting the ransom money for Duke upon his release from jail. Back in Mountbatton, Joe is now convinced that Duke and Donnie are connected to the Crosscut Killer mystery and is liaising with American Detective Victor Nicotero on the theory. Anna is horrified as she discovers that Joe is planning on being reinstated with the force, while Joe clashes with his father again as he has bought Shaun a ticket to New York to stay with him. Anna is subsequently kidnapped by Duke when he poses as a replacement gardener for a photoshoot she is doing. Joe saves a desperate Shaun from a drunken suicide attempt, only to then discover that Anna is missing...

Additional flashback sequences to Texas, show how Duke and Donnie embarked upon their sadistic rampage of rape and murder as they callously slayed a succession of innocent young women, proving that they were behind the Crosscut killings.

State pathologist Lara McClatchie contacts Frank Deegan telling him that were no similarities in the deaths of the Crosscut victims to Katie's murder but the recent murder of a young Limerick woman bear the same hallmarks. Frank now realises that Joe's theory about Duke Rawlins being in Ireland is true.

Still in under the belief that Anna has walked out on him and Shaun, Joe receives a call from Duke who is holding Anna in a remote cottage. He threatens to kill her unless Joe complies with his wishes. He discovers that Duke has a missing Tipperary woman, Siobhan Fallon, in his clutches too. As Duke taunts him on the phone about Anna, Joe turns the tables on the kidnapper by telling Duke about how his wife, Sammi, has been unfaithful to him. He informs Duke that she had been having an affair with Donnie while he was in prison and that she has gone to the police in Stinger's Creek confessing that her husband is the Crosscut Killer. The ransom money hadn't been for Duke, it was for Donnie and Sammi to have a fresh start with. While Joe is on the phone to Duke, Shaun overhears and is furious that Joe won't go to the Gardaí.

Meanwhile, in Texas, Victor Nicotero visits Ogden Parnum's widow on the pretense of investigating her husband's suicide. She tells Victor that Marcy Winbaum, a DA, who worked with Ogden some years previously came to visit him shortly before his death. Parnum's widow was suspicious over a heated conversation that Marcy had with her husband. It is revealed in a flashback to 1992, that Marcy had uncovered evidence linking Duke Rawlins to the Crosscut murders. Ogden questions Duke, who blackmails his interrogator as he was the paedophile who abused him as a child. Ogden provided Duke with an alibi, which allowed him to get away with his heinous crimes.

Duke brutally murders Siobhan in front of captive Anna who then tries to escape. Joe discovers Siobhan's body before finding a badly wounded Anna, who Duke had fired an arrow at. Duke then grabs Shaun and holds him over the edge of the lighthouse balcony in a precarious stand-off with Joe. With both Shaun and Anna's lives in jeopardy, Joe is issued with an ultimatum, call 999 for medical assistance for Anna or Shaun plummets to his death. Joe chooses to save Shaun and Duke escapes as an ambulance arrives at the lighthouse for Anna. Richie and Joe pursue Duke but lose him. In a fresh twist, a drug dealer reveals that Richie had murdered Katie as she had witnessed him tipping off the criminal. Richie is arrested for Katie's murder while Duke escapes the country.

In the novel's epilogue, Joe and Shaun are back in New York with Giulio with a traumatised Anna recuperating in her native Paris. It seems that the Lucchesis' marriage has broken down until Shaun receives a call from Anna saying that she is coming home to them.

== Characters in Darkhouse ==
- Detective Joe Lucchesi A family man dedicated to his wife and son, he is also a troubled soul haunted by the Hayley Gray kidnapping case. His turbulent relationship with his father Giulio forces him to confront more emotional turmoil from his past. He cannot hang up the title of law enforcer and finds himself embroiled in the Katie Lawson murder case. He will do all in his power to protect his beloved family.
- Duke Rawlins A dark and disturbing childhood moulds Duke into a dangerous psychopath with a penchant for sadistic violence. Loyalty to his best friend Donnie is first and foremost on his warped mind. He initiates acts of pain and has had a hold over Donnie since their childhood. He is driven by fury and thoughts of revenge upon hearing of Donnie's demise at the hands of Joe Lucchesi and strives towards destruction.
- Anna Lucchesi Joe's wife and mother to Shaun, she loves her career as an interior designer and has an affinity with the village of Mountsomething. However, her marriage to Joe is far from perfect as she is tormented by a guilty secret that could jeopardise her relationship with Joe.
- Shaun Lucchesi A happy-go-lucky sixteen-year-old who is madly in love with his girlfriend Katie until his world is turned upside down by her death. He becomes a suspect in her killing much to his devastation and embarks on a downward spiral as he clashes with Joe and those around him.
- Frank Deegan Frank is the local Sergeant, nearing retirement, who is shocked that a murder has occurred in the previously peaceful and idyllic village. He has the ability to empathise with human emotions but at times his professional competency is called into question by his younger colleagues.
- Richie Bates A fiery young Garda who also trains the local football team. He is highly disgruntled at Joe Lucchesi's sleuthing and clashes with him. His past is a tragic one as he witnessed the drowning of a close friend when he was a child.
- Donnie Riggs His impressionable nature proves precarious as he finds himself an accomplice in Duke's harrowing crimes. Duke's influence turns him into someone who eventually will betray and pay the price.
- Katie Lawson A vivacious, kind and popular teenager in a relationship with Shaun. Her brutal murder leaves the community baffled and devastated.

== Critical response ==
Mark Timlin heralded the novel as "...a terrific debut by an exciting new writer". Powell's Books said of Darkhouse, "In this electrifying thriller—a bestseller in Great Britain and Ireland—Alex Barclay creates a stunning array of contrasts—from the violence of a cop's world to the fragility of an embattled marriage, from the danger of New York's gritty streets to the quiet of a seaside Irish village. With brilliance and subtlety, Barclay delivers a nerve-wracking tale of a troubled family, facing a brutal danger rushing relentlessly out of the past". Sharon Wheeler in her review of the novel criticised the lack of character depth, "...Joe is forgettable, selfish interior designer Anna is hideous, and the teenage son Shaun apprentice hideous. There's a fairly bland cast of locals, including the archetypal good cop, bad cop".
