= Alex Barclay =

Irish crime fiction writer, former journalist (born 1974)

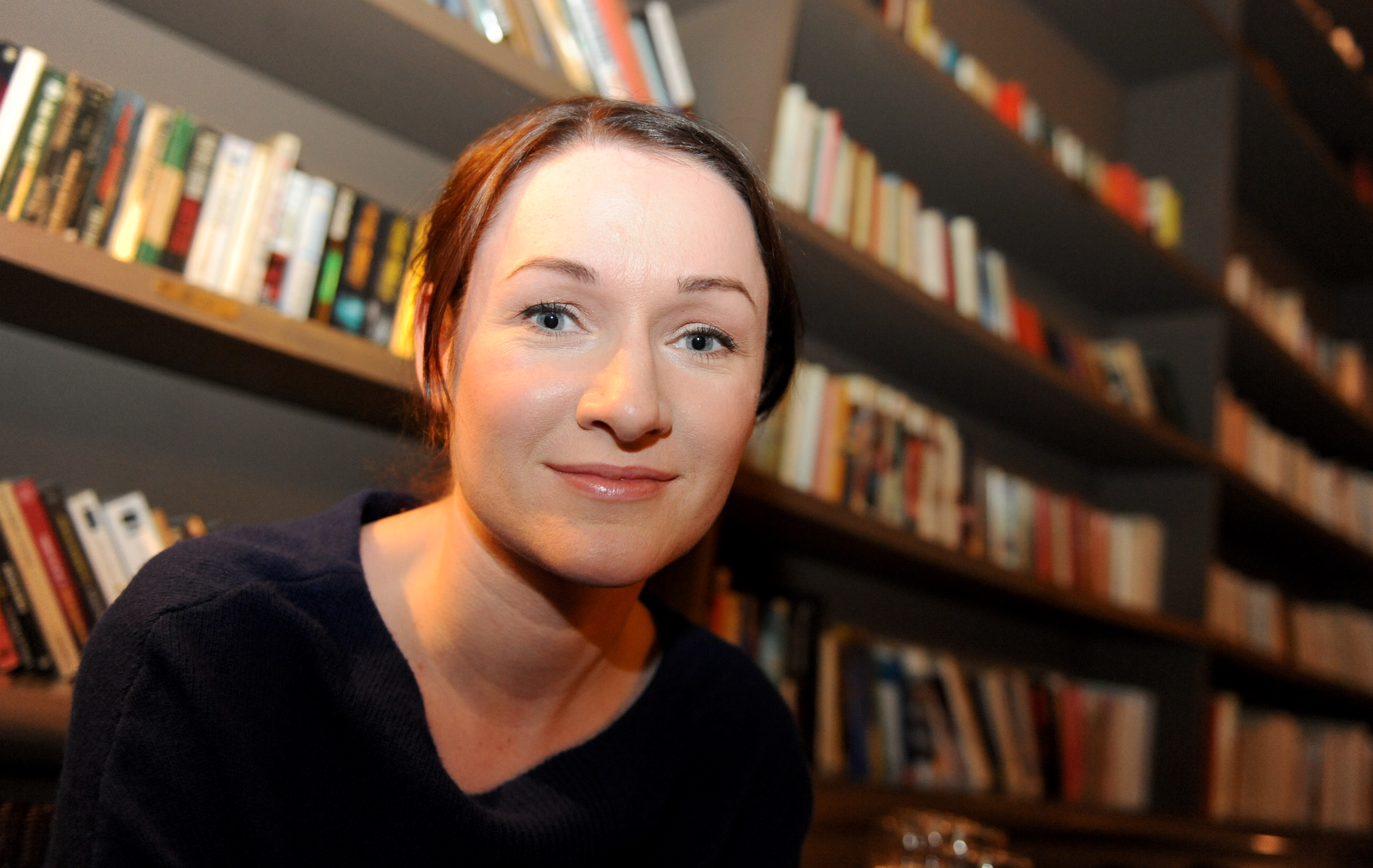
- Born: Yve Morris; 1974 (age 51–52); Bayside, Dublin, Ireland
- Education: Dublin City University
- Occupations: Fiction author, journalist
- Writing career
- Language: English
- Years active: 1992–2003 (journalist, prof. from 1996); 2003–present (crime fiction)
- Period: Contemporary
- Genres: Novel, short story
- Subject: Crime fiction
- Notable works: Darkhouse; The Ren Bryce series
- Notable awards: Irish Crime Novel of the Year; 2009

Yve Williams, née Morris, who writes under the name Alex Barclay (born Bayside, Dublin, Ireland in 1974), is an Irish journalist and crime writer.

== Life ==
=== Early life ===
Morris was born in Bayside, Dublin, and attended Bayside National School followed by Manor House School, Raheny. She studied journalism with French at Dublin City University, graduating in 1996. Her course included a period of study at Nanterre University in Paris. Morris also trained at the Gaiety School of Acting, appearing on television with Podge and Rodge.

=== Journalist ===
Morris started in journalism at the age of 18, and after graduation worked in areas such as construction and fashion and beauty journalism. She worked as features editor and deputy editor of U magazine, at one time Ireland's top-selling magazine for younger women, and also worked as fashion and beauty editor of the RTÉ Guide. She was also employed on the iVenus online publishing project. Morris worked as an advertising and corporate copywriter, and on name generation.

=== Novelist ===
==== Writing approach and the Joe Lucchesi novels ====
In 2003 key elements of Darkhouse came suddenly to mind, and after discussing a few paragraphs with her husband, Williams left the fashion publishing industry to write the novel. With three chapters written, a prominent London agent, Darley Anderson, expressed interest and Williams took six months of travelling time to finish the novel's first draft, including a period at the Anam Cara Writer's and Artist's Retreat in Eyeries on the Beara Peninsula, and with much of it written in Dunmore East, a seaside resort location similar to one of the main locales of the story. She put a strong emphasis on research, engaging experts from a lighthouse specialist to the Irish State Pathologist, Prof. Marie Cassidy. Her agent conducted an auction secured a substantial two-book rights deal, and international rights sales quickly followed.

As Williams thought at the time that she would continue as a journalist and copywriter, and wanted to keep the two writing careers separate, she devised the pseudonym Alex Barclay, which she felt was "the sort of strong name a thriller writer might have."

Darkhouse was the first of two novels featuring NYPD detective Joe Lucchesi. The book, set in Texas, New York and County Waterford, achieved strong reviews and was sold to more than ten markets, and translated into 18 languages. It was the top-selling paperback in Ireland for a period.

The author continued the practice of writing at least partly in remote locations, including a spell at Anam Cara for each published book.

Her second novel, The Caller, also featuring NYPD's Joe Lucchesi, was released in 2007; it was marketed in some territories as Last Call. The author mentioned in a 2007 interview that her fourth book - after a third book featuring an FBI agent - would return to Lucchesi but this did not transpire. However she restated in a 2014 interview that the Lucchesi character would return. The Caller is Barclay's top-selling book to date in the UK / Ireland market. After its publication, Barclay and her agent also secured a publisher contract for three more books.

==== Ren Bryce novels ====
Barclay's first novel about a female agent with a bipolar condition, Ren Bryce, entitled Blood Runs Cold, was published in 2008, and she won the inaugural Crime Fiction Award, sponsored by Ireland AM, at the Irish Book Awards, for this. Bryce works with an imaginary FBI group, the Rocky Mountain Safe Streets Task Force, based in Denver, Colorado. Five more books followed in this series, which has not concluded. The author continued a research-based approach for this series, with visits to the United States, including an invited visit to the FBI regional HQ in Denver.

==== Youth fiction ====
In 2013, Barclay released a novel for young adults, Curse of Kings. It was billed as the first of a series of six, the Trials of Oland Born, though no further titles in this series have been scheduled or published as of 2019, and in a 2016 interview, the author referred to the book in the singular.

In July 2019 it was announced that a new book for younger readers was submitted, a diary-form novel, My Heart & Other Breakables: How I lost my mom, found my dad, and made friends with catastrophe, with a hardback publication date of March 2020, this being the first volume in a two-book deal with HarperCollins Children's Books.

==== Standalone novel ====
A new book was announced by HarperCollins in 2019, and was launched on 2 August with an interview and reading at a joint event of the Skibbereen Arts Festival and the West Cork Literary Festival, at Liss Ard. The book, a novel titled I Confess, is promoted as a psychological thriller, on release 22 August in Ireland and the UK.

==== Events and media ====
Barclay has been on signing tours, as well as participating in literary and other festivals and events, including the Waterford Writers Weekend, and Electric Picnic. Media appearances included an on-air interview on RTÉ TV's The Panel.

==== Sales ====
As of July 2019 UK / Ireland sales per Nielsen BookScan (covering most outlets) of Barclay's crime novels had reached nearly 300,000 copies.

== Bibliography ==
=== Series (novels) ===
NYPD Detective Joe Lucchesi

1. Darkhouse (2005)
2. The Caller (2007)

FBI Special Agent Ren Bryce

1. Blood Runs Cold (2008)
2. Time of Death (2010)
3. Blood Loss (2012)
4. Harm's Reach (2014)
5. Killing Ways (2015)
6. The Drowning Child (2016)

The Trials of Oland Born

1. Curse of Kings (2013, series planned, not yet seen)

=== Standalone novel ===
1. I Confess (2019)

=== Short fiction ===
1. Rock Paper Killers - Alexia Mason
2. Roadkill Heart in the Trouble Is Our Business anthology (New Island Press, ed. Declan Burke)

== Personal life ==
Morris married television director Brian Williams in 2000. The wedding took place at Kilquiggan, Co. Wicklow, and the couple settled in Sandymount on Dublin's coast.

Barclay moved to the Beara Peninsula, West Cork, in 2007, and as of 2019 was still living in the village of Eyeries near Pallas Strand and Coulagh Bay.
