= Frank Williams =

Frank Williams may refer to:

== Arts and entertainment ==
- Frank D. Williams (cinematographer) (1893–1961), American cinematographer
- Francis William Sullivan (penname "Frank Williams", fl. 1910s), American novelist
- Frank Williams (actor) (1931–2022), British actor
- Franklin Delano Williams (1947–1993), American Gospel music singer

== Politics and law ==
- F. A. Williams (1851–1945), American jurist, Justice of the Supreme Court of Texas
- Frank E. Williams (1865–1920), American politician from Maryland
- Frank J. Williams (born 1940), American jurist, Chief Justice of the Rhode Island Supreme Court
- Frank Williams (politician) (born 1942), American politician in the state of Florida

== Sports ==
=== Association football ===
- Frank Williams (footballer, born 1906) (1906–1982), Welsh football player
- Frank Williams (footballer, born 1908) (1908–?), English football player and manager
- Frank Williams (footballer, born 1917) (1917–1978), Welsh football player
- Frank Williams (footballer, born 1921) (1921–1999), English football player

=== Australian rules football ===
- Frank Williams (Australian footballer, born 1884) (1884–1939), Australian rules footballer for St Kilda
- Frank Williams (Australian footballer, born 1888) (1888–1959), Australian rules footballer for Carlton
- Frank Williams (Australian footballer, born 1914) (1914–2005), Australian rules footballer for Carlton and Melbourne

=== Rugby ===
- Frank Williams (rugby, fl. 1910s), Welsh rugby union and rugby league footballer of the 1910s
- Frank Williams (English rugby league) (c. 1910–?), English rugby league footballer of the 1930s for England and Warrington
- Frank Williams (rugby union, born 1910) (1910–1959), Welsh international rugby union player

=== Other sports ===
- Frank Williams (cricketer) (1876–1946), New Zealand cricketer
- Frank Williams (outfielder) (1918–1987), American baseball player
- Frank Williams (gridiron football) (1932–2006), American gridiron football player
- Frank Williams (Formula One) (1942–2021), British founder and manager of the Williams Formula One team
- Frank Williams (pitcher) (1958–2009), American baseball player
- Frank Williams (cyclist) (born 1964), Sierra Leonean cyclist
- Frank Williams (basketball) (born 1980), American professional basketball player
- Frankie Williams (American football) (born 1993), American football player

== Others ==
- Frank Williams (Medal of Honor) (1872–1900), American sailor in the Spanish–American War
- Frank M. Williams (1873–1930), American engineer and surveyor
- Francis Williams, Baron Francis-Williams (Frank Williams, 1903–1970), British newspaper editor
- Frank Williams (architect) (1936–2010), American architect
- Frank Lunsford Williams (1864–1953) American educator, and civic leader
- Frank Abagnale (alias Frank Williams, born 1948), American impostor and forger

== See also ==
- Francis Williams (disambiguation)
- Frank Williams Racing Cars, a British Formula One team and constructor
- Franklin Williams (disambiguation)
