= William Frank =

William Frank is the name of:

- William Frank (politician) (1923–2023), Canadian politician
- Bill Frank (1938–2014), former offensive lineman in the Canadian Football League
- William J. Frank (born 1960), American politician
- Billy Frank (cricketer) (1872–1945), South African cricketer
- Billy Frank Jr. (1931–2014), Native American environmental leader and treaty rights activist
- William Frank (athlete) (1878–1965), U.S. athlete

== See also ==
- Bill Franke (born 1937), airline investor
- Billie Frank (disambiguation)
- William Francis (disambiguation)
- William Franks (disambiguation)
- Frank Williams (disambiguation)
