= William Francis =

William or Bill Francis may refer to:

== Politicians ==
- William B. Francis (1860–1954), American politician from Ohio
- William T. Francis (1869–1929), American lawyer, politician, and diplomat from Minnesota

== Science and academia ==
- William Francis (chemist) (1817–1904), British chemist and publisher
- William Douglas Francis (1889–1959), Australian botanist
- Bill B. Francis, academic

== Sports ==
- Willie Francis (swimmer) (1911–1997), Scottish backstroke swimmer
- William Francis (cricketer) (1856–1917), English cricketer
- Bill Francis (baseball) (1879–1942), Negro leagues baseball player
- Bill Francis (rugby union) (1894–1981), New Zealand rugby union footballer
- Bill Francis (rugby league) (1947–2024), rugby league footballer who played in the 1960s and 1970s for Wigan, Wales, and Great Britain
- Bill Francis (broadcaster) (born 1947), New Zealand broadcaster, author and sports administrator

== Others ==
- Wil Francis (born 1982), member of the American post-hardcore band Aiden
- Willie Francis (1929–1947), convicted murderer
- Sir William Francis (civil engineer) (1926–2025), British engineer

== See also ==
- William Frank (disambiguation)
