= Francis Williams =

Francis Williams may refer to:

- Francis Williams (headmaster) (1830–1895) Anglican priest and headmaster in South Australia
- Francis Williams (musician) (1910–1983), American jazz trumpeter
- Francis Williams (polymath) (c. 1690 – c. 1770), scholar and poet born in Kingston, Jamaica
- Francis Xavier Williams (1882–1967), American entomologist
- Francis Williams (alias Cromwell), MP for Huntingdonshire
- Francis Williams, Baron Francis-Williams (1903–1970), British newspaper editor and public relations advisor to British prime minister Clement Attlee
- Francis Williams (politician) (1914–1999), member of the Florida House of Representatives

== See also ==
- Frances Williams (disambiguation)
- Frank Williams (disambiguation)
