= William Franks =

William Franks may refer to:

- William Joseph Franks (1830–1880), United States Navy sailor and Medal of Honor recipient
- William Franks (died 1790), English property developer
- William Franks (landowner) (died 1797), English landowner
- William Franks (cricketer), (1820–1879)
- William Sadler Franks (1851–1935), British astronomer

== See also ==
- Frank Williams (disambiguation)
- William Frank (disambiguation)
