= Billie Frank =

Billie Frank or Billy Frank may refer to:

- Billie Frank (Rude Awakening), fictional character from the TV series Rude Awakening (1998–2001)
- Billie Frank, fictional character from the film 2001 Glitter
- Billy Frank, Jr. (1931–2024), American tribal fishing rights activist
- Billy Frank, Sr. (Nisqually, 1880–1980), father of Billy Frank, Jr., original owner of Frank's Landing
- Billy Frank (cricketer) (1872–1945), South African cricketer
- Billy Frank, childhood name of Billy Graham (1918–2018)

== See also ==
- William Frank (disambiguation)
