= List of people executed in Louisiana (pre-1972) =

The following is a list of people executed by the U.S. state of Louisiana before 1972, when capital punishment was briefly abolished by the Supreme Court's ruling in Furman v. Georgia. For people executed by Louisiana after the restoration of capital punishment by the Supreme Court's ruling in Gregg v. Georgia (1976), see List of people executed in Louisiana.

== Hanging ==
Slave executions
Executions by firing squad

=== 1810s ===
Name	Race	Age	Sex	Date of execution	Parish	Crime	Victim(s)	Governor
Unknown	Black		M	July 1812	St. Landry	Murder	Mrs. Doucet and her children, white	William C. C. Claiborne
Multiple unknowns	Native American			1813		Murder	Dr. Watson and Mr. O'Neale, white	William C. C. Claiborne
Jacob Young	White		M	September 26, 1813	Orleans (Military)	Desertion	N/A	William C. C. Claiborne
George Strickland	White		M	March 13, 1814	Natchitoches	Murder	Ross McCabe, white	William C. C. Claiborne
Reuben Hurd	White		M	February 24, 1815	Orleans (Military)	Murder-Mutiny	Sgt. John Haylor, white	William C. C. Claiborne
Andrew Whitman	White		M	March 2, 1818	Orleans	Attempted murder	Mr. McKoy, white	Jacques Villeré
William Wyatt	White		M	June 25, 1818	Orleans (Federal)	Murder	Capt. Cornelius Driscoll, white	Jacques Villeré
George Hartman	White		M	July 20, 1818	Orleans	Slave stealing	Unknown, black	Jacques Villeré
Wilson	Black		M	January 2, 1819	Concordia	Murder	Nicholas Delouma, white	Jacques Villeré
Unknown	Black		M	July 10, 1819	Rapides	Murder	Female, black (mistress)	Jacques Villeré

=== 1820s ===
Name	Race	Age	Sex	Date of execution	Parish	Crime	Victim(s)	Governor
Jean Desfarges	White	22	M	May 25, 1820	Orleans (Federal)	Piracy		Thomas B. Robertson
Robert Johnson	White		M	May 25, 1820	Orleans (Federal)	Piracy		Thomas B. Robertson
Bob	Black		M	June 14, 1821	Rapides	Murder	Nat, black	Thomas B. Robertson
Russell Brooks	White		M	1822	Ouachita	Murder	Male, white	Thomas B. Robertson
Charles Prevost	White	36	M	1825	Natchitoches	Murder	Spotswood Mills, white	Henry Johnson
Henry Gastor	White		M	August 17, 1825	West Feliciana	Murder	Henry Miller, white	Henry Johnson

=== 1830s ===
Name	Race	Age	Sex	Date of execution	Parish	Crime	Victim(s)	Governor
Zac	Black		M	February 13, 1830	Unknown (Note: Location given as "Mount Pleasant".)	Murder	John Whitten, white (owner)	Jacques Dupré
Edward Cullen	White		M	February 15, 1830	Lafourche	Murder	Hugh Guilihor, white	Jacques Dupré
Zachariah Linton	White		M	April 16, 1830	Orleans	Murder	William Brown, white	Jacques Dupré
John Brown	White		M	March 3, 1831	Orleans	Murder	Walter Borden, white	André B. Roman
Elijah	Black		M	June 4, 1831	Orleans	Attempted murder	Paul Pandely, white	André B. Roman
Manuel Feracko	Hispanic		M	April 23, 1832	Orleans	Murder	Senor Mayorquin, Hispanic	André B. Roman
Jacinto Fernandez	Hispanic		M	April 23, 1832	Orleans	Murder	Senor Mayorquin, Hispanic	André B. Roman
Jose Saureo	Hispanic		M	April 23, 1832	Orleans	Murder	Senor Mayorquin, Hispanic	André B. Roman
Philip	Black		M	September 5, 1832	Orleans	Murder	Mrs. Frederick Fayat, white	André B. Roman
Lucy	Black		F	November 1832	Jefferson	Poisoning	Louis Bouligny (owner) and family, white	André B. Roman
Unknown	Black		F	1835	St. Martin	Arson		Roman or White
Unknown	Black		M	1835	St. Martin	Arson		Roman or White
John Halthouser	White		M	1835	Claiborne	Murder-Robbery	Mr. Sloan, white	Roman or White
Old Harry	Black		M	May 14, 1836	Ouachita			Edward Douglass White Sr.
Alicia	Black		F	May 14, 1836	Ouachita			Edward Douglass White Sr.
Unknown	Black		M	May 18, 1836	Ouachita			Edward Douglass White Sr.
Four unknowns	Black		M	1836 or 1837	Webster	Murder	Mr. McIntyre, white	Edward Douglass White Sr.
Two unknowns	Black		M	1837	East Baton Rouge	Murder		Edward Douglass White Sr.
Thomas Tibbetts	White	22	M	April 28, 1837	Orleans	Murder	Unknown (Note: Previously convicted of killing his abusive step-father at age 10, given a shortened sentence due to his age and pardoned at age 21.)	Edward Douglass White Sr.
Unknown	Black			1837	Rapides	Murder		Edward Douglass White Sr.
Two unknowns	Black			1837	Assumption	Murder		Edward Douglass White Sr.
Unknown	Black			1837		Arson		Edward Douglass White Sr.
Bill	Black		M	August 1837	St. Helena	Murder	Elizabeth Gordon, white (owner)	Edward Douglass White Sr.
Jane	Black		F	August 1837	St. Helena	Murder	Elizabeth Gordon, white (owner)	Edward Douglass White Sr.
Jim	Black		M	October 10-12, 1837	Rapides	Slave revolt		Edward Douglass White Sr.
Henry	Black		M	October 10-12, 1837	Rapides	Slave revolt		Edward Douglass White Sr.
Joe	Black		M	October 10-12, 1837	Rapides	Slave revolt		Edward Douglass White Sr.
Edmond	Black		M	October 10-12, 1837	Rapides	Slave revolt		Edward Douglass White Sr.
Sam	Black		M	October 10-12, 1837	Rapides	Slave revolt		Edward Douglass White Sr.
Stephen	Black		M	October 10-12, 1837	Rapides	Slave revolt		Edward Douglass White Sr.
William	Black		M	October 10-12, 1837	Rapides	Slave revolt		Edward Douglass White Sr.
Five unknowns	Black		M	October 10-12, 1837	Rapides	Slave revolt		Edward Douglass White Sr.
Unknown	Black		M	January 10, 1838	East Baton Rouge	Murder	John Randolph, white (owner)	Edward Douglass White Sr.
Unknown	Black		F	January 10, 1838	East Baton Rouge	Murder	John Randolph, white (owner)	Edward Douglass White Sr.
Jose	Black		M	March 12, 1838	St. Bernard	Murder		Edward Douglass White Sr.
Jim	Black		M	March 12, 1838		Murder		Edward Douglass White Sr.
Joe	Black		M	March 12, 1838		Murder		Edward Douglass White Sr.
Brown	Black		M	March 12, 1838		Murder	Jules Balloc, white (owner)	Edward Douglass White Sr.
George	Black		M	June 8, 1838	Orleans			Edward Douglass White Sr.
Jackson	Black		M	June 22, 1838	Orleans	Attempted murder	James Purdon, white (owner)	Edward Douglass White Sr.
O'Neal	White		M	September 22, 1838	St. Bernard	Murder	Mr. Barba, white	Edward Douglass White Sr.
Welsh	White		M	September 22, 1838	St. Bernard	Murder	Mr. Barba, white	Edward Douglass White Sr.
Six unknowns	Black		M	February 11, 1839	St. James	Murder	Two unknowns, white (Note: Chicken thieves.)	André B. Roman
Johnson	White	19	M	March 16, 1839	Orleans	Murder	Unknown (Note: Serial killer, also confessed to murdering his brother in Quebec and being involved with the murders of an entire ship crew.)	André B. Roman
Thomas Meers	White		M	May 8, 1839	Orleans	Aggravated assault-Robbery	Recorder Baldwin, white	André B. Roman
John Stokes	White		M	May 8, 1839	Orleans	Aggravated assault-Robbery	Recorder Baldwin, white	André B. Roman
Cheri Bonanan	Black		M	June 3, 1839	Orleans	Murder	Mr. Marcon, white	André B. Roman
Jacques Durand	White		M	June 6, 1839	Iberville	Murder	Pierre Bestinabi, white	André B. Roman
Ned	Black		M	September 1839	West Feliciana	Murder	Unknown, black	André B. Roman

=== 1840s ===
Name	Race	Age	Sex	Date of execution	Parish	Crime	Victim(s)	Governor
29 unknowns	Black			1840	Iberville	Slave revolt		André B. Roman
Henry Wilkerson	Black		M	April 17, 1840	Concordia	Attempted murder	John Payne, white (owner)	André B. Roman
J. B. Millen	White		M	June 2, 1840	Orleans	Murder		André B. Roman
Primus	Black		M	July 23, 1840	Iberville	Attempted murder	Two males, white	André B. Roman
Prefere	Black		M	August 28, 1840	Lafayette	Insurrection		André B. Roman
Two unknowns	Black			August 28, 1840	Lafayette	Insurrection		André B. Roman
Jaroi	Black		M	September 5, 1840	St. Martin	Insurrection		André B. Roman
Stephen	Black		M	September 5, 1840	St. Martin	Insurrection		André B. Roman
Unknown	Black		M	September 5, 1840	St. Martin	Insurrection		André B. Roman
Henry	Black		M	September 19, 1840	St. Martin	Insurrection		André B. Roman
Don Louis	Black		M	September 19, 1840	St. Martin	Insurrection		André B. Roman
John	Black		M	October 3, 1840	East Feliciana	Burglary-Attempted murder		André B. Roman
David	Black		M	February 13, 1841	East Feliciana	Murder	Female, black (wife)	André B. Roman
Unknown	Black			March 1, 1841	Pointe Coupee			André B. Roman
Three unknowns	Black			March 8, 1841	St. Landry	Murder	John P. Moore, white (overseer)	André B. Roman
Hamilton	Black			August 7, 1841	Orleans	Aggravated assault		André B. Roman
John Marshall	Black		M	October 1841	Madison	Murder	Samuel S. Fox, white	André B. Roman
Four unknowns	Black		M	October 29, 1841	St. Mary	Murder	Capt. DeHart, white (owner)	André B. Roman
Unknown	Black		M	December 17, 1841	East Baton Rouge	Aggravated assault	Unknown, white (owner)	André B. Roman
Joe	Black		M	1842	Concordia			André B. Roman
Washington	Black		M	February 26, 1842	Orleans	Murder	Female, black (wife)	André B. Roman
Peter	Black		M	April 15, 1842	Pointe Coupee	Murder		André B. Roman
Rolla	Black		M	August 18, 1842	St. Mary	Murder	B. L. Wilcox, white	André B. Roman
David	Black		M	September 30, 1842	Rapides	Murder	Jacob Hamon, white	André B. Roman
Unknown	Black		F	October 14, 1842	Concordia	Attempted poisoning	Unknown family, white	André B. Roman
Unknown	Black		M	November 19, 1842	Lafourche	Murder	Mr. Summers, white	André B. Roman
Joseph Tricotti	White		M	March 24, 1843	Orleans	Burglary-Arson	Mr. Hollander, white	Alexandre Mouton
Antonio Landois	White		M	April 21, 1843	Orleans (Texas)	Murder-Mutiny	Male, white (lieutenant in command of Austin)	Alexandre Mouton
James Hudgins	White		M	April 21, 1843	Orleans (Texas)	Murder-Mutiny	Male, white (lieutenant in command of Austin)	Alexandre Mouton
Isaac Allen	White		M	April 21, 1843	Orleans (Texas)	Murder-Mutiny	Male, white (lieutenant in command of Austin)	Alexandre Mouton
William Simpson	White		M	April 21, 1843	Orleans (Texas)	Murder-Mutiny	Male, white (lieutenant in command of Austin)	Alexandre Mouton
Anthony	Black		M	May 8, 1843	Iberville	Aggravated assault	Mr. Schiarte, white	Alexandre Mouton
Mark	Black		M	1844	Caddo			Alexandre Mouton
Two unknowns	Black		M	April 22, 1844	St. Charles	Murder	Albert Carr, white (owner)	Alexandre Mouton
Henry	Black		M	March 13, 1845	St. Martin	Aggravated assault	Edmund LeBlanc, white (overseer)	Alexandre Mouton
Asbury	Black		M	March 21, 1845	Caddo	Murder	Unknown, white (owner)	Alexandre Mouton
Nelson	Black		M	March 21, 1845	Caddo	Murder	Unknown, white (owner)	Alexandre Mouton
Nat	Black		M	May 2, 1845	St. Landry	Murder	Robert, black	Alexandre Mouton
Unknown	Black		M	December 1845	Jackson	Aggravated assault	Mr. and Mrs. John Bartlett, white	Alexandre Mouton
Pauline	Black		F	March 28, 1846	Orleans	Attempted murder		Isaac Johnson
Alfred	Black		M	October 28, 1846	East Feliciana	Arson		Isaac Johnson
Bob	Black		M	November 11, 1846	Vermilion			Isaac Johnson
Lucy	Black		F	December 11, 1846	St. James	Murder		Isaac Johnson
Matthew	Black		M	February 8, 1847	Lafourche	Attempted murder	Dr. Deidrich, white	Isaac Johnson
Eliza	Black		F	March 4, 1847				Isaac Johnson
William	Black		M	May 11, 1847	Terrebonne			Isaac Johnson
Caesar	Black		M	May 11, 1847	Lafourche			Isaac Johnson
Robert	Black		M	July 5, 1847	East Feliciana			Isaac Johnson
Gilbert	Black		M	July 29, 1847	Washington			Isaac Johnson
Jim	Black		M	August 1847	St. Tammany	Murder	Alexander George, white (owner)	Isaac Johnson
Jim	Black		M	January 7, 1848	Jefferson	Murder	Gabriel, black	Isaac Johnson
Jerry	Black		M	April 22, 1848	St. Charles	Murder	J. R. Brusse, white (overseer)	Isaac Johnson
Yancey	Black		M	May 9, 1848	St. Charles			Isaac Johnson
James Ham	Black		M	May 9, 1848	St. Charles			Isaac Johnson
Jean Baptiste	Black		M	May 9, 1848	St. Charles			Isaac Johnson
Jack	Black		M	May 9, 1848	St. John the Baptist			Isaac Johnson
John Camel	Black		M	May 15, 1848	St. Charles			Isaac Johnson
Grandison	Black		M	May 24, 1848	St. Charles			Isaac Johnson
Edwin	Black		M	June 29, 1848	St. James			Isaac Johnson
Nelson	Black		M	June 29, 1848	St. James			Isaac Johnson
Pompey	Black		M	July or August 1848 (Note: Execution severely botched, had to be shot.)	Orleans	Rape	Female, 9, white	Isaac Johnson
Unknown	Black		M	August 1, 1848	Calcasieu			Isaac Johnson
Edmund	Black		M	January 12, 1849	Bossier			Isaac Johnson
Dick	Black		M	May 18, 1849	St. Landry	Murder	Mr. Hicks, white (overseer)	Isaac Johnson
Antonio Sebellech	White		M	June 1, 1849	Orleans (Federal)	Murder		Isaac Johnson
Frank	Black		M	June 29, 1849	East Feliciana	Murder	Fletcher Campbell, white	Isaac Johnson
Sam	Black		M	September 25, 1849				Isaac Johnson
Cyrina	Black		F	October 26, 1849	Caddo	Murder	Mr. Crawford, white (overseer)	Isaac Johnson
Big Henry	Black		M	November 10, 1849	Madison			Isaac Johnson
Jessee	Black		M	November 10, 1849	Madison			Isaac Johnson
Tom Purcell	Black		M	November 10, 1849	Madison			Isaac Johnson
Big Wash	Black		M	November 10, 1849	Madison			Isaac Johnson
Olla	Black		M	November 10, 1849	Madison			Isaac Johnson
John Miles	Black		M	November 10, 1849	Madison			Isaac Johnson

=== 1850s ===
Name	Race	Age	Sex	Date of execution	Parish	Crime	Victim(s)	Governor
Baker	Black		M	May 16, 1850	St. John the Baptist			Joseph Marshall Walker
Jim	Black		M	August 3, 1850	Caddo			Joseph Marshall Walker
Calvin	Black		M	August 26, 1850	Avoyelles	Murder	John Crawford, white (owner)	Joseph Marshall Walker
Moses	Black		M	August 26, 1850	Avoyelles	Attempted rape		Joseph Marshall Walker
Dick	Black		M	February 21, 1851	Avoyelles			Joseph Marshall Walker
John	Black		M	March 25, 1851	Jackson			Joseph Marshall Walker
Henry	Black		M	July 25, 1851	Ascension			Joseph Marshall Walker
Willis	Black		M	August 8, 1851	Catahoula	Murder	Mr. Bartlett, white (driver)	Joseph Marshall Walker
Edmond	Black		M	October 3, 1851	Jackson			Joseph Marshall Walker
Squire Preston	Black		M	October 10, 1851	Madison	Murder	Unknown (Note: Also confessed to the previous murder of another black slave.)	Joseph Marshall Walker
Riley	Black		M	November 7, 1851	East Baton Rouge			Joseph Marshall Walker
Allen	Black		M	November 9, 1851	Washington	Murder	Mr. Connery and another man, white	Joseph Marshall Walker
Ellen	Black		F	November 27, 1851	East Baton Rouge			Joseph Marshall Walker
Jean Adam	White		M	July 2, 1852	Orleans	Murder-Burglary	Mary, black	Joseph Marshall Walker
Anthony Delisle	White (Note: Creole.)		M	July 2, 1852	Orleans	Murder-Burglary	Mary, black	Joseph Marshall Walker
Solomon Smith	Black		M	September 10, 1852	Franklin	Attempted murder	William Hungerford, white	Joseph Marshall Walker
Henry	Black		M	December 31, 1852	St. Martin			Joseph Marshall Walker
Reuben	Black		M	April 13, 1853	St. Landry	Attempted murder	Rosemond Doucet, white (owner)	Paul Octave Hébert
John Memphis	Black		M	July 8, 1853	Assumption			Paul Octave Hébert
George	Black		M	July 29, 1853	Jackson			Paul Octave Hébert
Prince	Black		M	August 5, 1853	Carroll			Paul Octave Hébert
Clark	Black		M	October 15, 1853	St. Landry	Murder	Oliver Lefleur, white (owner)	Paul Octave Hébert
Bill	Black		M	1854	Bienville	Murder	William Wilson, white (overseer)	Paul Octave Hébert
Henson	Black		M	February 17, 1854	East Feliciana	Murder	Male, black	Paul Octave Hébert
Henry	Black		M	February 24, 1854	Tensas	Murder-Robbery	Male, white	Paul Octave Hébert
Horace	Black		M	March 3, 1854	Avoyelles			Paul Octave Hébert
Sam	Black		M	April 7, 1854	St. Mary			Paul Octave Hébert
Harden	Black		M	May 18, 1854	Concordia			Paul Octave Hébert
Frank Smith	White		M	July 7, 1854	Orleans	Murder	Female, white (wife)	Paul Octave Hébert
Thomas	Black		M	September 16, 1854	St. Mary			Paul Octave Hébert
Cato	Black		M	October 16, 1854	St. Tammany			Paul Octave Hébert
Five unknowns	Black		M	1855 (Note: Based on date owner was compensated.)	Ascension			Paul Octave Hébert
William Jung	White	45	M	February 2, 1855	Orleans	Murder	Christian Rhomor, 2, white	Paul Octave Hébert
Mango	Black		M	February 26, 1855	St. Charles	Murder	Westley Lathem, white	Paul Octave Hébert
Melvaine	Black		F	February 26, 1855	St. Charles	Murder	Westley Lathem, white	Paul Octave Hébert
Ben	Black		M	March 2, 1855	Ascension	Murder	Mrs. Haney, white	Paul Octave Hébert
Washington	Black		M	March 9, 1855	East Feliciana	Murder	Edward Mays, white	Paul Octave Hébert
Six unknowns	Black		M	June 22, 1855	Rapides	Murder	Mr. Walters, white (overseer)	Paul Octave Hébert
Daniel Callahan	White		M	July 13, 1855	Orleans	Murder		Paul Octave Hébert
Frank	Black	15	M	August 24, 1855	Rapides	Murder	Rev. J. J. Weems, white	Paul Octave Hébert
John	Black		M	September 21, 1855	Jefferson	Murder	Capt. Walling, white	Paul Octave Hébert
Dick	Black		M	October 5, 1855	Pointe Coupee	Murder-Robbery	Mr. and Mrs. John Jones, white	Paul Octave Hébert
Henry	Black		M	October 5, 1855	Pointe Coupee	Murder-Robbery	Mr. and Mrs. John Jones, white	Paul Octave Hébert
Washington	Black		M	October 5, 1855	Pointe Coupee	Murder-Robbery	Mr. and Mrs. John Jones, white	Paul Octave Hébert
Mass	Black		M	October 5, 1855	Pointe Coupee	Murder-Robbery	Mr. and Mrs. John Jones, white	Paul Octave Hébert
Jno. Blunt	Black		M	November 1, 1855	Jefferson			Paul Octave Hébert
Archy Carter	Black		M	November 1, 1855	Jefferson			Paul Octave Hébert
Powers	Black		M	January 18, 1856	Carroll			Paul Octave Hébert
Frederick	Black		M	February 8, 1856	Caddo	Arson		Robert C. Wickliffe
Peter Smith	Black		M	February 21, 1856	St. John the Baptist			Robert C. Wickliffe
Elizabeth	Black		F	April 16, 1856	Natchitoches	Arson		Robert C. Wickliffe
Spenco	Black		M	April 25, 1856	Carroll	Murder	C. J. Bristow, white (overseer)	Robert C. Wickliffe
Green	Black		M	April 26, 1856	Tensas			Robert C. Wickliffe
Henry Wilson	White		M	May 29, 1856	East Baton Rouge (Military)	Murder	Male, white (soldier)	Robert C. Wickliffe
Charles	Black		M	June 7, 1856	Lafourche	Murder	Mr. Moore, white (overseer)	Robert C. Wickliffe
Matthew Bressente	White		M	September 5, 1856	Natchitoches	Murder	John Rodrigo, white	Robert C. Wickliffe
Unknown	Black		M	November 1856	St. Martin	Slave revolt		Robert C. Wickliffe
Unknown	White		M	November 1856	St. Martin	Slave revolt		Robert C. Wickliffe
Patrick Kennedy	White		M	January 6, 1857	Orleans	Murder	James Cruise, white	Robert C. Wickliffe
Adrien	Black		M	January 23, 1857	Iberville			Robert C. Wickliffe
Stephens	Black		M	January 24, 1857	St. Tammany			Robert C. Wickliffe
Joe	Black		M	February 7, 1857	Avoyelles			Robert C. Wickliffe
Charles	Black		M	February 7, 1857	Avoyelles			Robert C. Wickliffe
Cyrus	Black		M	February 20, 1857	Jefferson			Robert C. Wickliffe
Albert	Black		M	June 25, 1857	Winn	Murder	James W. Matthews, white (owner)	Robert C. Wickliffe
Charles	Black		M	July 10, 1857	Madison	Murder	B. F. Yates, white	Robert C. Wickliffe
William	Black		M	July 24, 1857	Natchitoches	Murder	Unknown, black	Robert C. Wickliffe
Abe	Black		M	December 4, 1857	Franklin	Murder	Thomas N. Hobbs, white (owner)	Robert C. Wickliffe
Dock	Black		M	January 2, 1858	Carroll	Rape	Mrs. H. Jones, white	Robert C. Wickliffe
Unknown	Black		M	January 9, 1858	Webster	Murder	John Choffe, white (Note: House bombed.)	Robert C. Wickliffe
Antoine Krepple	White		M	February 19, 1858	Orleans	Murder-Robbery	Marie Shoemaker, white	Robert C. Wickliffe
George Stovall	White		M	April 17, 1858	Orleans	Murder	Mary Ray Durand, white	Robert C. Wickliffe
Joseph	Black	13	M	June 15, 1858	Lafayette	Murder	Elisee Missonier, white (owner)	Robert C. Wickliffe
James Nolan	White	22	M	June 16, 1858 (Note: First private execution.)	Orleans	Murder		Robert C. Wickliffe
Unknown	Black		M	July 29, 1858	Catahoula	Murder	George W. Heckler, white (overseer)	Robert C. Wickliffe
Unknown	Black		M	July 29, 1858	Catahoula	Murder	George W. Heckler, white (overseer)	Robert C. Wickliffe
Unknown	Black		M	July 29, 1858	Catahoula	Murder	Male, black	Robert C. Wickliffe
Joseph Wright	White		M	July 30, 1858	Orleans	Murder	Henry Keepe, white	Robert C. Wickliffe
John	Black		M	October 1, 1858	St. Martin	Murder	Joachim Como, white (overseer)	Robert C. Wickliffe
Isaac	Black		M	November 19, 1858	Rapides	Murder	Stephen Tier, white (overseer)	Robert C. Wickliffe
Henry	Black		M	March 1859	Carroll	Murder	William Watkins, white	Robert C. Wickliffe
Rose	Black		F	March 4, 1859	St. Landry	Attempted murder	Mrs. Singleton, white (owner)	Robert C. Wickliffe
Henrich Haase	White		M	March 18, 1859	Orleans	Murder	Male, white	Robert C. Wickliffe
Joseph Lindsey	White		M	March 18, 1859	Orleans	Murder	Male, white	Robert C. Wickliffe
Peter Smith	White		M	March 18, 1859	Orleans	Murder	Female, white (mistress)	Robert C. Wickliffe
Unknown	Black		M	July 1859		Rape	Female, white	Robert C. Wickliffe
William G. Bungers	White		M	July 15, 1859	Madison (Note: Change of venue from Concordia Parish.)	Murder	Female, white (wife)	Robert C. Wickliffe
Hamilton White	Black		M	July 22, 1859	Concordia	Murder		Robert C. Wickliffe
James Mullen	White		M	July 30, 1859	Orleans	Murder	James Maglone, white	Robert C. Wickliffe
Norris	Black		M	November 4, 1859	Caddo			Robert C. Wickliffe
Solomon	Black		M	December 30, 1859	East Feliciana	Attempted rape	Fanny Schlenker, white	Robert C. Wickliffe

=== 1860s ===
Name	Race	Age	Sex	Date of execution	Parish	Crime	Victim(s)	Governor
John Fermond	Black		M	January 24, 1860	St. James			Thomas Overton Moore
Artemas Benton	White		M	January 27, 1860	Caddo	Murder		Thomas Overton Moore
Daniel	Black		M	February 3, 1860	Avoyelles	Murder	Laurend Normand, white (owner)	Thomas Overton Moore
Spencer	Black		M	February 3, 1860	Avoyelles	Murder	Laurend Normand, white (owner)	Thomas Overton Moore
Isaac	Black		M	February 3, 1860	Terrebonne			Thomas Overton Moore
Modeste	Black	21	F	April 3, 1860	Lafayette	Murder	Madame Elisee Missonnier, white	Thomas Overton Moore
Henry	Black		M	April 20, 1860	West Feliciana	Murder	Charles, black	Thomas Overton Moore
Bailey	Black		M	April 24, 1860	Avoyelles	Murder	Christopher Edclon, white (owner)	Thomas Overton Moore
Baptiste	Black		M	April 24, 1860	Avoyelles	Murder	Christopher Edclon, white (owner)	Thomas Overton Moore
Jim	Black		M	April 24, 1860	Avoyelles	Murder	Christopher Edclon, white (owner)	Thomas Overton Moore
Patience	Black		F	April 24, 1860	Avoyelles	Murder	Christopher Edclon, white (owner)	Thomas Overton Moore
Matthew Hughes	White		M	June 15, 1860	Orleans	Murder	Henry Hyams, white	Thomas Overton Moore
John	Black		M	July 24, 1860	Ascension			Thomas Overton Moore
Denis	Black		M	August 31, 1860	St. Mary			Thomas Overton Moore
Dan	Black		M	September 21, 1860	Caddo	Murder	Vina, black	Thomas Overton Moore
Littleton	Black		M	October 1, 1860	Catahoula			Thomas Overton Moore
John Wright	Black		M	October 26, 1860	St. Charles	Attempted murder	Frederick Lidinger, white	Thomas Overton Moore
Pat Eagan	White	35	M	January 4, 1861	Orleans	Murder	Female, white (wife)	Thomas Overton Moore
John Osborne	White	36	M	January 4, 1861	Orleans	Murder	Female, white (wife)	Thomas Overton Moore
James	Black		M	January 4, 1861	Lafourche			Thomas Overton Moore
Tom	Black		M	March 16, 1861	Sabine			Thomas Overton Moore
Mack	Black		M	April 26, 1861	West Baton Rouge	Attempted murder	Jno. A. Bird, white (owner)	Thomas Overton Moore
Washington	Black		M	May 11, 1861	Washington			Thomas Overton Moore
Joe	Black		M	June 14, 1861	St. Charles			Thomas Overton Moore
Alexere	Black		M	June 24, 1861	St. Martin			Thomas Overton Moore
Bill	Black		M	June 24, 1861	St. Martin			Thomas Overton Moore
Henry	Black		M	June 24, 1861	St. Martin			Thomas Overton Moore
Jack	Black		M	June 24, 1861	St. Martin			Thomas Overton Moore
Michel	Black		M	June 24, 1861	St. Martin			Thomas Overton Moore
Tom	Black		M	June 24, 1861	St. Martin			Thomas Overton Moore
Bob	Black		M	June 26, 1861	Carroll			Thomas Overton Moore
Lewis	Black		M	July 22, 1861	Union			Thomas Overton Moore
David Barner	Black		M	1862	Bossier	Rape	Female, white	Thomas Overton Moore
Big Bob	Black		M	January 17, 1862	Tensas	Murder	Westley, black	Thomas Overton Moore
Charles	Black		M	February 7, 1862	Vermilion	Murder	Cesare LeBlanc, white	Thomas Overton Moore
Jean Louis	Black		M	February 7, 1862	Vermilion	Murder	Cesare LeBlanc, white	Thomas Overton Moore
Rasbery McFaden	Black		M	February 14, 1862	St. Helena			Thomas Overton Moore
William Browne	White	24	M	February 21, 1862	Orleans	Murder	Barney McGuire, white	Thomas Overton Moore
William W. Cassidy	White		M	February 21, 1862	Orleans	Murder	Male, white	Thomas Overton Moore
Jake	Black		M	March 21, 1862	St. Mary			Thomas Overton Moore
William	Black		M	March 21, 1862	St. Mary			Thomas Overton Moore
Henry	Black		M	April 22, 1862	Morehouse			Thomas Overton Moore
Benjamin	Black		M	May 10, 1862	East Baton Rouge			Thomas Overton Moore
Ben	Black		M	May 12, 1862	Caldwell			Thomas Overton Moore
William Mumford	White	42	M	June 7, 1862	Orleans	Treason	N/A (Note: Mumford, a Confederate sympathizer, led a mob that tore down the American flag which was placed in front of the mint.)	Thomas Overton Moore
George W. Craig	White		M	June 15, 1862	Orleans	Burglary		Thomas Overton Moore
William M. Clary	White		M	June 15, 1862	Orleans	Burglary		Thomas Overton Moore
Frank Newton	White		M	June 15, 1862	Orleans	Burglary		Thomas Overton Moore
Stanislaus Roy	White		M	June 15, 1862	Orleans	Burglary		Thomas Overton Moore
Caroline	Black		F	July 25, 1862	East Feliciana			Thomas Overton Moore
Big Alfred	Black		M	July 28, 1862	Morehouse			Thomas Overton Moore
Jake	Black		M	July 28, 1862	Morehouse			Thomas Overton Moore
Wash	Black		M	July 28, 1862	Morehouse			Thomas Overton Moore
Ann	Black		F	August 8, 1862	Lafayette			Thomas Overton Moore
Jake	Black		M	August 22, 1862	Rapides			Thomas Overton Moore
Elysees	Black		M	September 5, 1862	St. Martin			Thomas Overton Moore
Burnett	Black		M	September 6, 1862	Claiborne			Thomas Overton Moore
George	Black		M	September 23, 1862	Calcasieu			Thomas Overton Moore
Celestin	Black		M	October 18, 1862	Assumption			Thomas Overton Moore
Henry	Black		M	November 12, 1862	St. Landry			Thomas Overton Moore
Basil	Black		M	November 18, 1862	St. Landry			Thomas Overton Moore
Ben	Black		M	February 20, 1863	Carroll			Thomas Overton Moore
Chloe	Black		F	February 20, 1863	Carroll			Thomas Overton Moore
Henry Hammill	White	39	M	April 23, 1863	St. Mary	Pillaging		Thomas Overton Moore
Francis Scott	White	30	M	August 14, 1863	Orleans	Murder	Maj. J. D. Bullen, white (commanding officer)	Thomas Overton Moore
William Davis	White	23	M	August 30, 1863	Lafourche	Mutiny	N/A	Thomas Overton Moore
Richard Smith	White	26	M	August 30, 1863	Lafourche	Mutiny	N/A	Thomas Overton Moore
Warren	Black		M	September 29, 1863	Rapides			Thomas Overton Moore
John	Black		M	October 14, 1863	Rapides			Thomas Overton Moore
George	Black		M	December 11, 1863	Claiborne			Thomas Overton Moore
Charles Turner	White	24	M	December 28, 1863	Orleans	Desertion	N/A	Thomas Overton Moore
Dan	Black		M	January 22, 1864	Bossier			Thomas Overton Moore
Benjamin	Black		M	May 13, 1864	Bienville			Michael Hahn
Joe Polydor	Black		M	October 16, 1864	Caddo	Murder-Rape	Eleanor Gibson, 7, black	Michael Hahn
Larkin Rhea	White	19	M	December 30, 1864	East Baton Rouge (Military)	Murder	Dr. Sadler, white	Michael Hahn
John Mitchell	Black	39	M	December 8, 1865	Orleans (Note: Change of venue.)	Murder-Rape	Eleanor Gibson, 7, black	James Madison Wells
Fortune Wright	Black		M	March 2, 1866	Orleans (Military)	Murder	Dr. Tazewell, white (Note: Possibly an Octavius Tazevant at Carrollton.)	James Madison Wells
Louis Wilson	Black		M	March 23, 1866	Orleans	Murder	Male, black	James Madison Wells
Simon Brown	Black		M	November 17, 1866	Iberville	Murder	Mary Fisher, black (girlfriend)	James Madison Wells
Edmund Harrison	Black		M	May 1, 1867	West Feliciana	Murder	Eddie Smith, white	James Madison Wells
Dennis	Black		M	May 25, 1867	Jefferson	Rape	Regina Lochbein, white	James Madison Wells

=== 1870s ===
Name	Race	Age	Sex	Date of execution	Parish	Crime	Victim(s)	Governor
Vincent Bayonne	White	25	M	May 13, 1871	Orleans	Murder-Robbery	Mr. Ambrosia, white (naval sailor) (Note: He, Bayonne, and Abriel were all Spanish sailors of the same company, however it is unknown if it was an American or Spanish company.)	Henry C. Warmoth
Peter Abriel	White	31	M	May 13, 1871	Orleans	Murder-Robbery	Mr. Ambrosia, white (naval sailor)	Henry C. Warmoth
Alfred Decanoux	Black		M	September 16, 1871	St. James	Murder	Fred Menthath, white	Henry C. Warmoth
Noel Hampton	Black		M	September 16, 1871	St. James	Murder	Fred Menthath, white	Henry C. Warmoth
John Williams	Black		M	September 16, 1871	St. James	Murder	Fred Menthath, white	Henry C. Warmoth
Antonio Maurice	Black		M	August 21, 1874	Assumption	Murder-Rape	Three people, white and black (Note: Mr. and Mrs. Elisha Eastwood (white) and another woman (black). Mr. Eastwood was murdered and the two women were raped.)	William Pitt Kellogg
Anderson Perry	Black		M	August 21, 1874	Assumption	Murder-Rape	Three people, white and black	William Pitt Kellogg
John Robertson	Black		M	August 21, 1874	Assumption	Murder-Rape	Three people, white and black	William Pitt Kellogg
John Ross	Black		M	August 21, 1874	Assumption	Murder-Rape	Three people, white and black	William Pitt Kellogg
James Williams	Black		M	August 21, 1874	Assumption	Murder-Rape	Three people, white and black	William Pitt Kellogg
Ishom Brown	Black		M	April 16, 1875	St. Helena	Murder	James W. Clinton, white	William Pitt Kellogg
Richard Moss	Black		M	May 7, 1875	Plaquemines	Murder	Mr. Williams, white	William Pitt Kellogg
Henry Nicholson	White		M	November 19, 1875	Red River	Murder-Robbery	Marcus Young, white	William Pitt Kellogg
Alcee Harris	Black	24	F	November 26, 1875	Ouachita	Murder	Male, black (Harris's husband)	William Pitt Kellogg
Tony Hellum	Black		M	November 26, 1875	Ouachita	Murder	Male, black (Harris's husband)	William Pitt Kellogg
Adrian Aveque	Mixed (Note: Mulatto.)	20	M	June 15, 1877	Orleans	Murder	Richard Turner, black	Francis T. Nicholls
George Morris	Black	25	M	June 15, 1877	Orleans	Murder	Sarah Jones, black (girlfriend)	Francis T. Nicholls
Joaquin Florenzo	Asian (Note: Filipino from Manila, possibly of Chinese or Malay descent.)	35	M	June 15, 1877	Orleans	Murder	Marie Louise, mixed (girlfriend) (Note: Mulatta.)	Francis T. Nicholls
Jules Guidry	White (Note: Creole.)	32	M	July 25, 1877	Calcasieu	Murder	John Beale, white	Francis T. Nicholls
James McClendon	Black		M	December 14, 1877	Morehouse	Murder	C. M. Evans, white	Francis T. Nicholls
Jackson Edwards	Black	33	M	April 22, 1878	St. Mary	Murder	James Edwards, black (brother)	Francis T. Nicholls
Wesley Turner	Black	17	M	April 22, 1878	St. Mary	Murder	Frederick Erhardt, white	Francis T. Nicholls
Alexander Brown	Black	25	M	April 22, 1878	St. Mary	Murder-Robbery	William Dudley, black	Francis T. Nicholls
Isaiah Evans	Black	23	M	May 10, 1878	Tangipahoa	Murder	Edward Bowen, white	Francis T. Nicholls
Porter Brown	Black		M	May 10, 1878	Sabine	Murder-Robbery	Dr. W. H. Evans, white	Francis T. Nicholls
Jesse Walker	Black	22	M	May 24, 1878	Union	Murder	Violet Sims, white	Francis T. Nicholls
Wilson Childers	Black		M	August 15, 1878	Ascension	Murder-Robbery	Narcisse Arrieux, 60, white	Francis T. Nicholls
Fourtan Banks	Black		M	August 15, 1878	Ascension	Murder-Robbery	Narcisse Arrieux, 60, white	Francis T. Nicholls
Octave Louve	Black		M	August 15, 1878	Ascension	Murder-Robbery	Narcisse Arrieux, 60, white	Francis T. Nicholls
Aaron Carter	Black		M	August 15, 1878	Ascension	Murder-Robbery	Narcisse Arrieux, 60, white	Francis T. Nicholls
Robert Cheney	Mixed (Note: Mulatto.)	18	M	May 16, 1879	Iberville	Rape	Amelia Voight, 13, white	Francis T. Nicholls
Absalom W. Ford	White		M	May 23, 1879	Calcasieu	Murder	Joseph Baiee, white (Note: Possible serial killer, commonly reported to have also killed several men in Texas.)	Francis T. Nicholls

=== 1880s ===
Name	Race	Age	Sex	Date of execution	Parish	Crime	Victim(s)	Governor
Joseph Walker	Black	27	M	April 2, 1880	East Carroll	Murder	Major George, black	Louis A. Wiltz
Gustave Breaux	Black		M	April 2, 1880	West Baton Rouge	Murder	Unknown (overseer), white	Louis A. Wiltz
Villiere Powell	Black	19	M	September 30, 1880	St. James	Murder-Robbery	Theogene Gaudet, white	Louis A. Wiltz
Achille Thomas	Black	23	M	September 30, 1880	St. James	Murder-Robbery	Theogene Gaudet, white	Louis A. Wiltz
Sam Travis	Black		M	July 8, 1881	Rapides	Murder-Robbery	A. J. Hanna, white	Louis A. Wiltz
Terence Achilles	Black		M	January 6, 1882	St. Mary	Murder-Robbery	Mr. Larmand, white	Samuel D. McEnery
Sterling Ben	Black		M	January 6, 1882	St. Mary	Murder-Robbery	Mr. Larmand, white	Samuel D. McEnery
Augustus Davis	Black		M	January 27, 1882	Orleans	Rape	Elizabeth Dietzel, 65, white (Note: Serial rapist, previously convicted of raping a mulatto woman and sentenced to two years imprisonment several years prior.)	Samuel D. McEnery
Edward Belton	Black	29	M	January 27, 1882	DeSoto	Attempted murder-Robbery	Alfred Smith, black	Samuel D. McEnery
Jack Chatman	Black		M	September 22, 1882	Bossier	Murder	John Williams, black	Samuel D. McEnery
Paul Pringle	Mixed (Note: "Dark mulatto".)		M	October 13, 1882	DeSoto	Attempted murder-Robbery	Alfred Smith, black	Samuel D. McEnery
Gustave Paul	Black		M	December 8, 1882	Ascension	Murder	Eve Thompson, black	Samuel D. McEnery
Peter Thomas	Black		M	December 15, 1882	DeSoto	Murder	Dick Bright, black	Samuel D. McEnery
Robert Butler	Black	27	M	May 4, 1883	Caldwell	Murder	George Beney, black	Samuel D. McEnery
Henry Revels	Black		M	May 11, 1883	East Carroll	Murder	Henry Hyams, white	Samuel D. McEnery
Leander Coleman	Black	22	M	May 25, 1883	Bossier	Murder	John Gay, white (Note: Also admitted to murdering his stepfather John Brotter when he was 15.)	Samuel D. McEnery
Esau Smith	Black		M	August 31, 1883	Tensas	Murder	Esau McCann, race unknown	Samuel D. McEnery
Henry Dickerson	Black		M	September 7, 1883	Iberville	Murder	John Steele, black	Samuel D. McEnery
Richmond Stuart	Black	22	M	November 30, 1883	Caddo	Murder	Female, black (wife)	Samuel D. McEnery
Edward Rector	Black		M	January 4, 1884	East Baton Rouge	Murder	Duncan Williams, black	Samuel D. McEnery
Jerry Alexander	Black		M	January 11, 1884	Bienville	Murder	Sam Fleming, white	Samuel D. McEnery
Thomas Benton	Black	23	M	February 15, 1884	Iberville	Murder	Robert Duggan, white	Samuel D. McEnery
William Moore	Black		M	February 29, 1884	St. Mary	Murder	Lee Arman, Asian	Samuel D. McEnery
Noah Jackson	Black		M	March 7, 1884	East Carroll	Murder	Female, 15, black (wife)	Samuel D. McEnery
Joe McGee	White		M	April 4, 1884	Red River	Murder	Green Gordy, white	Samuel D. McEnery
William Brooks	Black		M	May 2, 1884	Rapides	Murder	Female, black (wife)	Samuel D. McEnery
Ed Elie	Black		M	June 7, 1884	East Feliciana	Murder-Rape	Eliza George and Anna Barber, 17 (Eliza), black	Samuel D. McEnery
Wilson Sanders	Black		M	July 11, 1884	Grant	Murder	Frank Page, white	Samuel D. McEnery
Cummings Nelson	Black		M	July 18, 1884	Terrebonne	Murder	John Martin, black	Samuel D. McEnery
Hendrick Holland	Mixed		M	July 25, 1884	Orleans	Murder	Anna Glover, mixed (wife) (Note: Both she and Holland are identified as mulattoes.)	Samuel D. McEnery
Victor Eloe	White (Note: Creole.)	45	M	July 25, 1884	Orleans	Murder	Delia McGraw, white (wife)	Samuel D. McEnery
Joseph Berryman	Black	25	M	August 29, 1884	Natchitoches	Murder	Scott Carter, black	Samuel D. McEnery
Berry Johnson	Black	42	M	August 29, 1884	Caddo	Murder	Female, black (wife) (Note: Admitted at his execution to killing a black woman, Malinda Coleman, in Red River Parish four years earlier after another black woman paid him to do so.)	Samuel D. McEnery
William Williams	Mixed (Note: "Dark mulatto".)	28	M	August 29, 1884	St. Mary	Murder	William Burgess, black	Samuel D. McEnery
Albert Goodman	Black		M	October 31, 1884	St. Bernard	Murder	Louis Maspero, white	Samuel D. McEnery
Charles Goodman	Black		M	October 31, 1884	St. Bernard	Murder	Louis Maspero, white	Samuel D. McEnery
Joe Foster	Black	22	M	December 5, 1884	Natchitoches	Rape	Julia McLaughlin, 45, white	Samuel D. McEnery
Foster Chase	Mixed	26	M	June 5, 1885	Orleans	Murder	Louisa Prevost, mixed (love interest) (Note: Both she and Chase are identified as mulattoes.)	Samuel D. McEnery
Robert Williams	Black	26	M	June 5, 1885	Orleans	Murder	Charles Dyes, black	Samuel D. McEnery
Perry Melton	White	59	M	June 19, 1885	Union	Murder	John W. Cherry, white	Samuel D. McEnery
William Melton	White	37	M	June 19, 1885	Union	Murder	John W. Cherry, white	Samuel D. McEnery
Charles Campbell	Black	22	M	June 19, 1885	Plaquemines	Murder	Theodore Tripwitch, white	Samuel D. McEnery
Charles Davis	Black	42	M	July 31, 1885	Iberville	Murder-Robbery	Henrietta Cole, 70, white	Samuel D. McEnery
Matilda Jones	Black	41	F	July 31, 1885	Iberville	Murder-Robbery	Henrietta Cole, 70, white	Samuel D. McEnery
George Wilson	Black	24	M	July 31, 1885	Iberville	Murder-Robbery	Henrietta Cole, 70, white	Samuel D. McEnery
Richard Johnson	Black	23	M	August 8, 1885	Concordia	Murder	John Simmons, black	Samuel D. McEnery
John Alexander	Black	35	M	December 11, 1885	Orleans	Murder	Female, black (wife)	Samuel D. McEnery
William George	Black	56	M	January 15, 1886	East Carroll	Murder	Peggy Johnson, black (mistress)	Samuel D. McEnery
Henry Jackson	Black		M	January 22, 1886	Webster	Murder-Robbery	R. A. Britton, white	Samuel D. McEnery
Patrick Ford	White	40	M	March 12, 1886	Orleans	Murder	A. H. Murphy, white	Samuel D. McEnery
John Murphy	White	29	M	March 12, 1886	Orleans	Murder	A. H. Murphy, white	Samuel D. McEnery
Alfred Taylor	Black	22	M	June 4, 1886	St. Landry	Rape	Female, white	Samuel D. McEnery
John Davis	Black		M	June 4, 1886	Assumption	Murder	Female, black (wife)	Samuel D. McEnery
Dennis Boyd	Black		M	June 11, 1886	Bossier	Murder	David Hess, white	Samuel D. McEnery
George Harrison	Black	22	M	July 16, 1886	Caddo	Murder	George Allen, black	Samuel D. McEnery
Sampson Roland	Black	23	M	July 16, 1886	Ascension	Murder	Mr. Gersdorff, white	Samuel D. McEnery
George Solomon	Black	35	M	July 16, 1886	Ascension	Murder	Henry Smith, black	Samuel D. McEnery
Charles Edwards	Black	26	M	October 1, 1886	Orleans	Murder	Hattie Refuge, white	Samuel D. McEnery
James Jones	Black		M	January 7, 1887	Bossier	Murder	Emma Edwards, black (girlfriend)	Samuel D. McEnery
Andrew Fleming	Black	22	M	October 21, 1887	Madison	Murder	Demp Benyon, white	Samuel D. McEnery
Jim Conelm	Black	14	M	February 3, 1888	Webster	Murder	Ernest Wren, <5, white	Samuel D. McEnery
Moses Flanders	Black		M	December 21, 1888	Iberville	Murder	Cornelius Brown, black	Francis T. Nicholls
Pat Overton	Black		M	December 28, 1888	Morehouse	Murder	Frank Hersey, race unknown	Francis T. Nicholls
Joseph Elijah Brown	Black		M	April 12, 1889	Sabine	Rape	Female, 8, black (step-daughter)	Francis T. Nicholls
Tom Bowling	Black	19	M	July 26, 1889	East Baton Rouge	Murder	Phillip Walsh, 19, white	Francis T. Nicholls
Charles Sellers	Black		M	July 26, 1889	Richland	Murder	Bunyan Adams, black	Francis T. Nicholls
Louis Demarest	White	24	M	August 16, 1889	Calcasieu	Murder	Benoit Billeandean, white	Francis T. Nicholls
Sumner Miller	Black	21	M	August 16, 1889	Calcasieu	Murder	John Younger, black	Francis T. Nicholls
Wilson Nockum	Black	32	M	August 30, 1889	Iberville	Murder	Ben Fisher, black	Francis T. Nicholls
Louis Nugent	Black	30	M	November 8, 1889	West Baton Rouge	Murder	Hamp Sulfield, white	Francis T. Nicholls
Carter Williamson	White	37	M	December 13, 1889	Iberville	Murder	Female, white (wife)	Francis T. Nicholls
Thomas Spooner	Black	21	M	December 13, 1889	West Baton Rouge	Murder	Seth Swearingen, white	Francis T. Nicholls

=== 1890s ===
Name	Race	Age	Sex	Date of execution	Parish	Crime	Victim(s)	Governor
Galvin Morris	Black	19	M	January 3, 1890	Terrebonne	Murder	Alfred Harris, black	Francis T. Nicholls
Isaiah Dent	Black		M	January 17, 1890	East Feliciana	Murder	Herman Praetorians, white	Francis T. Nicholls
Charles Dent	Black		M	January 17, 1890	East Feliciana	Murder	Herman Praetorians, white	Francis T. Nicholls
James Holcomb	Black	21	M	January 17, 1890	St. John the Baptist	Murder-Rape	Madeline Willis, black	Francis T. Nicholls
Edmond Nicholas	Black	18	M	March 22, 1890	St. Mary	Murder	Louisa Derame, race unknown	Francis T. Nicholls
Prince Saunders	Black		M	March 22, 1890	Iberville	Murder	Female, black (girlfriend)	Francis T. Nicholls
Aleck Starks	Black	22	M	May 16, 1890	Ascension	Murder	Alice Washington, 6, black	Francis T. Nicholls
William Johnson	Black	25	M	July 11, 1890	Orleans	Murder	Mary Banks, black (girlfriend)	Francis T. Nicholls
James Jackson	Black	24	M	March 1, 1891	East Carroll	Murder	Mary Cloud, race unknown	Francis T. Nicholls
William Green	Black	23	M	April 17, 1891	Jefferson	Murder	Joseph Prosper, black	Francis T. Nicholls
Melville Johnson	Black	22	M	April 24, 1891	West Baton Rouge	Murder	David Jones, black	Francis T. Nicholls
John Wilson	Black	23	M	April 24, 1891	West Baton Rouge	Rape	Mary Woods, 16, black (sister-in-law)	Francis T. Nicholls
Tom Harris	Black	35	M	June 26, 1891	Caddo	Murder	Ella Franklin, mixed (estranged wife) (Note: Also admitted to murdering his infant child three years prior shortly before his execution. He had been tried for this murder, however the jury returned a manslaughter verdict "which the judge refused to receive under the evidence.")	Francis T. Nicholls
David Woodson	Black	23	M	August 21, 1891	Ascension	Murder	Frank Williams, black (uncle)	Francis T. Nicholls
Charles Large	Black		M	September 4, 1891	Calcasieu	Murder-Robbery	Emma Gattison and Peter Freti, black	Francis T. Nicholls
W. M. Dial	Black		M	September 4, 1891	Calcasieu	Murder-Robbery	Emma Gattison and Peter Freti, black	Francis T. Nicholls
Gus Simmons	Black		M	November 27, 1891	DeSoto	Murder	Unidentified male, white	Francis T. Nicholls
Frank Garrett	Black		M	November 27, 1891	DeSoto	Murder	Unidentified male, white	Francis T. Nicholls
William Smith	Black	24	M	February 19, 1892	Jefferson	Murder	Dominic Commerio, white	Francis T. Nicholls
Phil Baker	White		M	April 22, 1892	Orleans	Murder-Robbery	Laura Frank, white (Note: Initially attacked Frank's wife, his employer Neil Nelson. Frank ordered Baker to not kill Nelson, distracting Baker and allowing Nelson to flee the scene; when he returned, she was found dead.)	Francis T. Nicholls
Etienne Deschamps	White	62	M	May 12, 1892	Orleans	Murder-Rape	Juliette Deitsch, 12, white	Francis T. Nicholls
Charles Evans	Black		M	August 19, 1892	St. Tammany	Murder	W. H. Cook, white (deputy sheriff)	Murphy J. Foster
Allen Beadle	Black		M	January 13, 1893	Orleans	Murder	William Hamilton, black	Murphy J. Foster
Dan Underwood	Black	45	M	February 24, 1893	St. Charles	Murder	Frank Winters, black	Murphy J. Foster
Lewis Michael	Black		M	March 24, 1893	St. Martin	Murder-Robbery	Mr. Robertson and daughter, white	Murphy J. Foster
Henry Fuller	Black	22	M	April 7, 1893	St. James	Murder	Henry Ross, black	Murphy J. Foster
John Howard	Black	35	M	April 7, 1893	St. James	Murder	Delia Wright, black	Murphy J. Foster
Lewis Taylor	Black	27	M	May 19, 1893	Calcasieu	Rape	Harriet Washington, black	Murphy J. Foster
Gus Albers	White	26	M	June 30, 1893	Orleans	Murder	Mrs. F. Wyman, white	Murphy J. Foster
Leonard Ashley	Black		M	December 15, 1893	St. Charles	Murder	Charles Coleman, black	Murphy J. Foster
Dave Johnson	Black		M	March 2, 1894	East Baton Rouge	Murder-Robbery	Mike Kane, white (Note: Also murdered Prof. Emil von Hofe at Burnside.)	Murphy J. Foster
Mansfield Washington	Black		M	March 2, 1894	East Baton Rouge	Murder-Robbery	Mike Kane, white	Murphy J. Foster
Silas Hill	Black		M	March 9, 1894	Tensas	Murder	Britton Neal, race unknown	Murphy J. Foster
Sidney Macre	Black	38	M	March 9, 1894	Terrebonne	Murder	Female, black (wife)	Murphy J. Foster
Ike Causey	Black		M	August 24, 1894	East Baton Rouge	Murder	Clay Bernard, white	Murphy J. Foster
Randall Butler	White		M	October 5, 1894	Assumption	Murder	Marguerite Butler, white (wife)	Murphy J. Foster
Dunk Williams	Black	22	M	November 9, 1894	Lafourche	Murder	Eugene Peterson, black	Murphy J. Foster
Sam Stephens	Black		M	December 7, 1894	Pointe Coupee	Murder		Murphy J. Foster
January Wright	Black	21	M	March 1, 1895	Lafourche	Murder	Anderson Lincoln, black	Murphy J. Foster
Joseph Valsin	Black		M	March 22, 1895	Natchitoches	Murder	Major Anthony, black	Murphy J. Foster
Frank Fuller	Black		M	April 19, 1895	Orleans	Murder	Female, black (wife)	Murphy J. Foster
Ben Brodder	Black		M	April 19, 1895	Madison	Murder	Unknown, black	Murphy J. Foster
Frank Harris	Black	25	M	November 8, 1895	Lafourche	Murder	Joseph Roundtree, white	Murphy J. Foster
Richard Hyams	Black		M	December 6, 1895	Grant	Murder	Male, white	Murphy J. Foster
William Patterson	Black		M	January 11, 1896	Iberia	Murder	Sarah Adams, black	Murphy J. Foster
Muff Williams	Black		M	February 14, 1896	Assumption	Murder	Augustine Johnson, black (father-in-law)	Murphy J. Foster
Arthur Schneider	White	20	M	April 10, 1896	Orleans	Murder	Herman Schroeder, white	Murphy J. Foster
Jim Murray	Black	38	M	July 24, 1896	Orleans	Murder	Michael C. Cotter, white	Murphy J. Foster
John Heard	Black	24	M	July 24, 1896	Claiborne	Murder	Female, black (wife)	Murphy J. Foster
Mose Wilson	Black		M	October 2, 1896	Union	Murder	Tom and Caroline Franklin, black	Murphy J. Foster
Sam Armstrong	Black		M	October 30, 1896	Concordia	Murder	Female, black (wife)	Murphy J. Foster
Will Chevis	Black		M	November 6, 1896	St. Landry	Murder	Dr. Courtney, white	Murphy J. Foster
Cypher Connelly	Black		M	March 12, 1897	Washington	Murder	Ellis Magee, white	Murphy J. Foster
Willie Edwards	Black		M	March 13, 1897	Terrebonne	Rape	Elvira Pellegrin, 16, white	Murphy J. Foster
Alexis Blanc	White	19	M	April 2, 1897	Lafayette	Murder-Robbery	Martin Begnaud, white	Murphy J. Foster
Ernest Blanc	White	20	M	April 2, 1897	Lafayette	Murder-Robbery	Martin Begnaud, white	Murphy J. Foster
Jim Willis	Black		M	June 4, 1897	DeSoto	Murder	Female and male, black (wife and father-in-law)	Murphy J. Foster
Allen Butler	Black		M	June 18, 1897	West Baton Rouge	Murder	Lisa Butler, black (wife)	Murphy J. Foster
Pat Paine	White		M	October 8, 1897	Ouachita	Murder	Female, white (wife)	Murphy J. Foster
William Morris	Black		M	January 7, 1898	St. Charles	Murder-Robbery	Louis Ziegler, white (Note: Richard had previously murdered another peddler, C. Constantine.)	Murphy J. Foster
Antoine Richard	Black		M	January 7, 1898	St. Charles	Murder-Robbery	Louis Ziegler, white	Murphy J. Foster
George Washington	Black		M	January 7, 1898	St. Charles	Murder-Robbery	Louis Ziegler, white	Murphy J. Foster
John Graham	Black		M	March 4, 1898	Franklin	Murder	Gyp Taylor, black (father-in-law)	Murphy J. Foster
Reuben Victor	Black	33	M	April 1, 1898	Iberville	Murder	John Allen, black	Murphy J. Foster
J. T. Timberlake	White	32	M	April 15, 1898	Rapides	Murder	M. Welch Balilo, white	Murphy J. Foster
Owen Jackson	Black	20	M	April 15, 1898	St. James	Murder	Salvadore Miscarat, 16, white	Murphy J. Foster
Nathan Williams	Black		M	April 22, 1898	East Baton Rouge	Murder	William T. Stockwell, white	Murphy J. Foster
Louis Durant	White	39	M	May 27, 1898	Livingston	Murder	Mrs. Lobdell, white (sister-in-law)	Murphy J. Foster
Adam Robertson	Black		M	June 3, 1898	St. Helena	Murder	James A. Carruth, white (Huntsville postmaster)	Murphy J. Foster
Joe Hill	Black		M	June 10, 1898	East Feliciana	Murder	Margaret Foster, black	Murphy J. Foster
Gus Grimble Jr.	Black		M	October 28, 1898	Franklin	Murder	Female, black (wife)	Murphy J. Foster
Simon Fassett	Black		M	December 16, 1898	Tensas	Murder	Gus McQueen, black	Murphy J. Foster
Albert Tate	Black	25	M	February 19, 1899	Ascension	Murder	Lettie Brooks, black (girlfriend)	Murphy J. Foster
Jack Bradley	Black		M	March 3, 1899	Bienville	Murder	Female and her child, black	Murphy J. Foster
Alexander Mitchell	Black	29	M	July 2, 1899	Iberville	Murder	Silvey Ticen, black	Murphy J. Foster
John Fields	Black		M	July 21, 1899	East Feliciana	Murder-Robbery	Lee Hughes, black	Murphy J. Foster
Frank Naska	White		M	August 4, 1899	St. John the Baptist	Murder	Rosario Cordina, white (Note: Serial killer; also killed a man on the Elmhall plantation, an Italian couple in Gramercy, and another person at Elmhall.)	Murphy J. Foster
Louis Guidry	Black	22	M	August 18, 1899	St. Mary	Murder	John Bernauer, 40, white (constable) (Note: Murdered Bernauer while he was attempting to arrest him for the murder of fellow constable Henry Crocha (26, white).)	Murphy J. Foster
Val Bates	Black	30	M	November 17, 1899	East Baton Rouge	Rape	Mrs. William Borsky, white	Murphy J. Foster
William Walker	Black		M	November 17, 1899	East Carroll	Murder	William Logan, black	Murphy J. Foster

=== 1900s ===
Name	Race	Age	Sex	Date of execution	Parish	Crime	Victim(s)	Governor
Handy Davis	Black		M	February 23, 1900	Plaquemines	Murder-Robbery	George Batrus, Syrian	Murphy J. Foster
Charles Brown	Black		M	March 2, 1900	Orleans	Murder-Robbery	Martial Sorrel, white	Murphy J. Foster
John Green	Black		M	March 2, 1900	Orleans	Murder-Robbery	Martial Sorrel, white	Murphy J. Foster
Thomas Nathaniel	Black		M	March 9, 1900	Lafourche	Murder	Anna Manuel, black ("concubine")	Murphy J. Foster
Oscar Williams	Black		M	June 1, 1900	East Baton Rouge	Murder	Female, black (wife)	William Wright Heard
Bell McSwain	Black		M	July 6, 1900	Richland	Murder	Dr. Franklin C. Parnell, white	William Wright Heard
Jim Parker	Black		M	July 6, 1900	Richland	Murder	Dr. Franklin C. Parnell, white	William Wright Heard
Ben Perry	Black		M	January 5, 1901	Tensas	Murder		William Wright Heard
Gus Smith	Black		M	January 5, 1901	Tensas	Murder		William Wright Heard
Sam Williams	Black		M	January 25, 1901	DeSoto	Murder	Joseph Bolenberger, white	William Wright Heard
Arthur Pierre	Black		M	January 25, 1901	St. Mary	Murder	Henry Neil, white	William Wright Heard
Stanley Gordon	Black		M	March 8, 1901	St. Landry	Murder	Female, black (wife)	William Wright Heard
William Payne	Black	35	M	March 8, 1901	St. Landry	Murder		William Wright Heard
Nathan Simpson	Black		M	March 8, 1901	St. Landry	Murder	Sam Goldberg, white	William Wright Heard
Joe Thomas	Black		M	April 12, 1901	Caddo	Murder	Camelia Williams, white	William Wright Heard
Ed Wagner	Black		M	November 8, 1901	Lafourche	Murder	Female, black	William Wright Heard
General Washington	Black		M	March 13, 1902	DeSoto	Murder	Mrs. Taylor, white	William Wright Heard
Marshall Canady	Black		M	April 4, 1902	West Feliciana	Murder	Joe Woods, black	William Wright Heard
Ed Carter	Black		M	April 4, 1902	West Feliciana	Murder	Joe Woods, black	William Wright Heard
Neal Gibbs	Black		M	April 4, 1902	West Feliciana	Murder	Philip Gibbs, black (cousin)	William Wright Heard
Ellis Washington	Black		M	April 18, 1902	Ascension	Murder-Robbery	Lee Guismar, white	William Wright Heard
Philip Wallace	Black		M	April 18, 1902	Ascension	Murder-Robbery	Lee Guismar, white	William Wright Heard
Willie Williams	Black		M	December 19, 1902	Pointe Coupee	Murder	Albert Herbert, white	William Wright Heard
John Keziah	Black		M	June 4, 1903	Caddo	Murder	Charles Steele, white	William Wright Heard
Albert E. Batson	White		M	August 14, 1903	Calcasieu (Note: Crime committed near Welsh, in modern-day Jefferson Davis Parish.)	Murder-Robbery	Earll family, white	William Wright Heard
Joseph Comeaux	Black		M	September 12, 1903	Cameron	Murder	Mrs. O'Brien and her daughter, white	William Wright Heard
Sam Stewart	Black	22	M	September 18, 1903	Concordia	Murder	Dan Bartlett, white	William Wright Heard
Girard Smith	Black		M	December 18, 1903	Concordia	Murder-Robbery	Benjamin Rappaport, white (Note: Serial killer, admitted to murdering two black men before his execution.)	William Wright Heard
Moses Lewis	Black		M	September 23, 1904	Orleans	Rape	Elizabeth Kientz, 13, white (Note: Also suspected of murdering her brother.)	Newton C. Blanchard
Henry Johnson	Black		M	September 23, 1904	Natchitoches	Murder	Male, black (brother)	Newton C. Blanchard
Bill Johnson	Black		M	September 30, 1904	Caddo	Murder	Henry Young, black	Newton C. Blanchard
Charles Foley	White		M	November 7, 1904	Orleans	Murder	Richard Flynn, white	Newton C. Blanchard
Jenkins Ferguson	Black		M	December 9, 1904	Calcasieu	Murder	Willis Hampton, black	Newton C. Blanchard
Tom Underwood	Black	41	M	February 17, 1905	Rapides	Murder	R. G. Aymond, white (police officer) (Note: Murdered Aymond while resisting arrest for the murder of Iretta Parker (black.))	Newton C. Blanchard
Ed Richardson	Black		M	February 17, 1905	Bossier	Murder	Emma McGehee, black	Newton C. Blanchard
Lewis Lyons	White	54	M	March 24, 1905	Orleans	Murder	J. Ward Gurley, white (district attorney)	Newton C. Blanchard
Tom Robinson	Black		M	March 31, 1905	East Carroll	Murder	Elbert Beck, black	Newton C. Blanchard
Jules Valentine	Black		M	April 28, 1905	Ascension	Burglary	Mrs. W. C. Hazlip, white (Note: Also confessed to murdering an unidentified brickmason near Gretna and his brother-in-law Adam Emsley in New Orleans. Mrs. Hazlip lost an eye due to injuries sustained during the burglary.)	Newton C. Blanchard
Sam Aspara	White		M	April 28, 1905	Orleans	Murder	Antonio Luciano, white	Newton C. Blanchard
Wesley Wilson	Black		M	May 26, 1905	Bossier	Murder	Letha Thomas, black (girlfriend)	Newton C. Blanchard
Amos Holmes	Black	19	M	July 7, 1905	Iberia	Rape	Female, white	Newton C. Blanchard
Nathan Walker	Black		M	July 28, 1905	Concordia	Murder	Charles Hauck, white	Newton C. Blanchard
Alex Winn	Black		M	July 28, 1905	Concordia	Murder	Charles Hauck, white	Newton C. Blanchard
Bob Burton	Black		M	August 4, 1905	Lincoln	Attempted rape	Lilly Wells, white	Newton C. Blanchard
James Mason	Black		M	November 10, 1905	West Baton Rouge	Murder	Abe Skipper, black	Newton C. Blanchard
Oscar Bee	Black		M	February 2, 1906	Tensas	Murder	Two males, white	Newton C. Blanchard
Ed Williams	Black		M	February 2, 1906	Ascension	Rape	Female, 13, black (daughter)	Newton C. Blanchard
Charles Coleman	Black		M	March 1, 1906	Caddo	Murder-Rape	Margaret Lear, white	Newton C. Blanchard
William Randall	Black		M	March 30, 1906	Madison	Murder	Norris Claiborne, black	Newton C. Blanchard
William Young	Black		M	May 11, 1906	Richland	Rape	Emma Louis, 10, black	Newton C. Blanchard
Robert Poindexter	Black		M	July 27, 1906	Iberville	Murder	Frank and Vincent Bueto, white	Newton C. Blanchard
Dave Howard	Black	28	M	August 24, 1906	Lafayette	Murder	Joseph Breaux, Syrian	Newton C. Blanchard
Isaac Berryman	Black	28	M	October 19, 1906	Caddo	Murder	Female, black (wife)	Newton C. Blanchard
Thomas Brady	White	55	M	December 7, 1906	Rapides	Rape	Julia Warren, 16, white (Note: Serial rapist; previously convicted of raping another girl in Illinois and sentenced to 14 years in the state penitentiary there, but escaped while on parole.)	Newton C. Blanchard
Robert Stevenson	Black		M	March 15, 1907	Bossier	Murder	John Hawkins, black	Newton C. Blanchard
Junius Jones	Black		M	April 26, 1907	Assumption	Murder	Female, black (wife)	Newton C. Blanchard
Elius LeBlanc	White		M	July 12, 1907	St. Martin	Murder	Aurelle Willz, white (wife)	Newton C. Blanchard
George Steward	Black	22	M	July 19, 1907	St. Tammany	Rape	Mrs. Maurice Lacroix, white	Newton C. Blanchard
Lazar Mehojevich	White	48	M	August 9, 1907	Orleans	Rape	Hilda Borchers, 11, white	Newton C. Blanchard
Lewis Young	Black	17	M	October 11, 1907	St. John the Baptist	Rape	Mrs. Louis Barre, 60+, white	Newton C. Blanchard
Phil Thomas	Black		M	October 25, 1907	East Baton Rouge	Murder	Willis Tracey, white	Newton C. Blanchard
Lee Coleman	White	46	M	January 3, 1908	Calcasieu	Murder	William Shoemake, white (deputy sheriff)	Newton C. Blanchard
Robert Weston	Black		M	January 17, 1908	West Feliciana	Murder	A. K. Weydert, white	Newton C. Blanchard
Albert West	Black		M	February 7, 1908	Calcasieu	Murder	James Clancy, white	Newton C. Blanchard
Edmond Williams	Black		M	February 7, 1908	Calcasieu	Murder	Alice Charles, black (girlfriend)	Newton C. Blanchard
John Culpepper	Black		M	February 7, 1908	East Carroll	Murder	Charles W. Frost, white	Newton C. Blanchard
Calvin Thomas	Black		M	February 7, 1908	East Feliciana	Murder	Henry Dayer, black	Newton C. Blanchard
Tobe Stevens	Black		M	April 24, 1908	Calcasieu	Attempted rape	Flora Compton, 17, white	Newton C. Blanchard
Edgar Wylie	Black		M	May 16, 1908	Franklin	Murder	John Mason, white	Newton C. Blanchard
Robert Hall	Black		M	October 23, 1908	Plaquemines	Murder	Unknown (two persons), black	Jared Y. Sanders Sr.
Ernest Montgomery	Black	31	M	October 23, 1908	Vermilion	Murder	Eva Menigue (wife) and Theobert Brooks, black	Jared Y. Sanders Sr.
Edward Ayles	Black		M	October 23, 1908	Rapides	Murder	Female, black (wife) (Note: After being read his death warrant, Ayles killed two of his cellmates with a knife, but apparently was never charged for this incident.)	Jared Y. Sanders Sr.
Edward Honore	Black		M	October 23, 1908	Orleans	Murder	Robert J. Cambias, 23, white (police officer)	Jared Y. Sanders Sr.
Jacques Pierre	Black		M	October 23, 1908	Orleans	Murder	Robert J. Cambias, 23, white (police officer)	Jared Y. Sanders Sr.
Ben Jones	Black		M	March 5, 1909	West Baton Rouge	Murder	C. B. Hall, white	Jared Y. Sanders Sr.
Wallace Jones	Black		M	March 5, 1909	West Baton Rouge	Murder	C. B. Hall, white	Jared Y. Sanders Sr.
Charles Davis	Black		M	March 5, 1909	West Baton Rouge	Murder	C. B. Hall, white	Jared Y. Sanders Sr.
Willie Williams	Black		M	March 5, 1909	Jefferson	Murder	Willie Brooks, black	Jared Y. Sanders Sr.
Jack Ratier	Black		M	March 5, 1909	St. Mary	Murder	Mary McCoy, black (girlfriend)	Jared Y. Sanders Sr.
Andrew Washington	Black		M	March 5, 1909	Madison	Murder	Malissa Washington, black (wife)	Jared Y. Sanders Sr.
Charles Madison	Black		M	March 5, 1909	Calcasieu	Rape	Sidonia Kelly, 11, black	Jared Y. Sanders Sr.
Burton Broadus	Black		M	May 14, 1909	Franklin	Murder	Jesse Miller, black	Jared Y. Sanders Sr.
Jim Collier	Black		M	June 18, 1909	Madison	Murder	Male, black (father-in-law)	Jared Y. Sanders Sr.
Henry Blankford	Black		M	June 18, 1909	Calcasieu	Murder-Robbery	Rene Reed, white	Jared Y. Sanders Sr.
Monroe Smith	Black		M	June 18, 1909	Calcasieu	Murder-Robbery	Rene Reed, white	Jared Y. Sanders Sr.
Leonardo Gebbia	White		M	July 16, 1909	St. Charles	Murder-Kidnap	Walter T. Lamana, 10, white	Jared Y. Sanders Sr.
Emanuel Johnson	Black		M	October 8, 1909	Vermilion	Burglary-Attempted rape	Anelle Marceaux, white	Jared Y. Sanders Sr.
Bud Zeno	Black		M	October 8, 1909	Natchitoches	Murder	His wife and another woman, black	Jared Y. Sanders Sr.
Avery Blount	White		M	October 15, 1909	Tangipahoa	Murder	Breeland family, white (Note: Joseph "Buz" Breeland, his wife Susan, and his stepdaughter Mrs. Everette.)	Jared Y. Sanders Sr.
George Gilford	Black		M	November 19, 1909	West Carroll	Murder	Moses T. Brock, white	Jared Y. Sanders Sr.
Alex Hill	Black		M	November 19, 1909	West Carroll	Murder	Moses T. Brock, white	Jared Y. Sanders Sr.
Tom Hill	Black		M	November 19, 1909	West Carroll	Murder	Moses T. Brock, white	Jared Y. Sanders Sr.
Bud Davis	Black	37	M	December 17, 1909	Ouachita	Rape	Lillie Lee, 9, black (Note: Serial rapist; previously given a five-year sentence from this same parish for the rape of another black girl, but was released after four years (April 25th that year) for good behavior.)	Jared Y. Sanders Sr.

=== 1910s ===
On June 19, 1910, governor Jared Y. Sanders passed Act No. 61, House Bill No. 24, ordering that all executions were to take place at the state prison in Baton Rouge. Hugh Connerly was the first person to be hanged at the state prison under this new law. The law was repealed in 1918, the last of the 35 hangings at Baton Rouge being that of Jim Bell and Preston Miles, and executions returned to local settings until 1957 (see Electrocution).

Name	Race	Age	Sex	Date of execution	Parish	Crime	Victim(s)	Governor
Carl Bortunna	White	27	M	January 14, 1910	Orleans	Murder	John G. Knecht, white	Jared Y. Sanders Sr.
Armas Woods	Black		M	February 11, 1910	Acadia	Murder-Robbery	Manseur Nacer, Syrian	Jared Y. Sanders Sr.
Josh Mitchell	Black		M	February 25, 1910	Caddo	Murder	Reuben Douglas, black	Jared Y. Sanders Sr.
Manuel Blas	Black	25	M	April 8, 1910	St. James	Murder	Female, black	Jared Y. Sanders Sr.
Isom Robinson	Black		M	June 3, 1910	Tensas	Murder	A. C. Dejon, white	Jared Y. Sanders Sr.
Hugh Connerly	Black	26	M	November 25, 1910	Washington	Murder	Ed W. Pierce, white (deputy sheriff)	Jared Y. Sanders Sr.
Sam Jackson	Black		M	December 9, 1910	Madison	Murder	Female, black (wife)	Jared Y. Sanders Sr.
Louis Williams	Black		M	December 9, 1910	Madison	Murder	Peck Thomas, black	Jared Y. Sanders Sr.
Westley Rooks	Black		M	January 13, 1911	Terrebonne	Murder	Marguerite Rooks, black (wife)	Jared Y. Sanders Sr.
Willie Fletcher	Black		M	March 10, 1911	East Baton Rouge	Murder	William Millican, white	Jared Y. Sanders Sr.
François Rodin	White		M	April 21, 1911	Orleans	Murder-Robbery	Franz Reidel, white	Jared Y. Sanders Sr.
Eugene Besançon	White		M	April 21, 1911	Orleans	Murder-Robbery	Franz Reidel, white	Jared Y. Sanders Sr.
Joseph Daniels	Black		M	May 26, 1911	Ascension	Murder	Jesse Doe, black	Jared Y. Sanders Sr.
John Bird	Black	30	M	May 26, 1911	Ascension	Murder	Nick and Clara Turner, white	Jared Y. Sanders Sr.
Tim Williams	Black		M	August 11, 1911	East Baton Rouge	Murder	Myron Collette, white	Jared Y. Sanders Sr.
Cliff Lee	Black		M	January 12, 1912	Tensas	Murder	Harry Rich, black	Jared Y. Sanders Sr.
Will Claxton	Black		M	February 9, 1912	Madison	Murder	Warren Rebecca, black (constable)	Jared Y. Sanders Sr.
James Max	Black		M	September 6, 1912	Caddo	Murder	Lizzie Max, black (wife)	Luther E. Hall
John Williams	Black		M	December 20, 1912	Tensas	Murder	Unknown, black	Luther E. Hall
Albert Watson	White	46	M	March 28, 1913	Caddo	Murder	C. C. Bailey, white	Luther E. Hall
Jerry Lundy	Black		M	May 9, 1913	Pointe Coupee	Murder	LeRoy Mercier, 22, white	Luther E. Hall
Parris Wyatt	Black		M	September 19, 1913	Iberia	Murder	Peter Carrado, white (inmate) (Note: Previously convicted of murdering his father Tim Wyatt in Tensas Parish and sentenced to life imprisonment. Crime committed at Hope Farm near Jeanerette where Carrado was also serving a life term for the murder of Mike Maltese.)	Luther E. Hall
Seth Jefferson	Black		M	September 18, 1914	Winn	Murder-Robbery	Mr. and Mrs. Samuel Chandler, 75 and 70, white	Luther E. Hall
Henry Slaughter	Black		M	October 2, 1914	Allen	Burglary-Attempted rape	Mr. and Mrs. C. L. Smith, white	Luther E. Hall
George Cotton	Black	17	M	November 6, 1914	Calcasieu	Rape	Mrs. C. H. Blocker, white	Luther E. Hall
John Turner	Black		M	June 11, 1915	Claiborne	Murder	John Sanders, white	Luther E. Hall
Peter Bouy	Black	24	M	December 17, 1915	Sabine	Rape	Female, white	Luther E. Hall
Robert Bacon	Black		M	March 10, 1916	Concordia	Murder	Walter Zimmerman, white	Luther E. Hall
Charles Victoriano	Mixed (Note: Described himself as Italian, but claimed his parents were Irish (mother) and Filipino (father).)	60	M	June 29, 1917	Jefferson	Murder	Joe Lee, Asian	Ruffin G. Pleasant
Leonard Hill	Black		M	October 19, 1917	Allen	Murder	Leona Booker, black	Ruffin G. Pleasant
Helaire Carriere	White	30	M	October 19, 1917	St. Landry	Murder	Marion L. Swords, white (sheriff) (Note: Also indicted for killing a black fisherman, Dave Pierce, in Jefferson Davis Parish.)	Ruffin G. Pleasant
Summa Levine	Black		M	November 2, 1917	Vermilion	Rape	Mrs. Theobald Romero, white	Ruffin G. Pleasant
John Bonney	?		M	November 2, 1917	Madison	Murder		Ruffin G. Pleasant
Victor Jones	Black		M	December 21, 1917	Jefferson	Murder-Robbery	James S. Brady, white	Ruffin G. Pleasant
Henry Hamilton	White		M	March 1, 1918	East Carroll	Murder-Robbery	Sophy James, white	Ruffin G. Pleasant
James Randolph Enterkin	White		M	March 15, 1918	Concordia	Murder-Robbery	John A. Wurtzer, white	Ruffin G. Pleasant
Walter Campbell	Black		M	March 15, 1918	East Baton Rouge	Murder	Albert Dickerson, black	Ruffin G. Pleasant
Willie Stewart	Black		M	June 14, 1918	Beauregard	Murder-Robbery	J. C. Collins, white	Ruffin G. Pleasant
Jim Bell	Black	18	M	June 28, 1918	West Feliciana	Burglary (Note: Also attempted to murder both victims during the crime.)	Mr. and Mrs. James D. Wood, white	Ruffin G. Pleasant
Preston Miles	Black		M	June 28, 1918	West Feliciana	Rape	Female, 6, black	Ruffin G. Pleasant
Lucius Brown	Black		M	August 8, 1919	Terrebonne	Attempted rape	Ms. Blanchard, white	Ruffin G. Pleasant
Ernest Hamlin	Black	32	M	September 19, 1919	Caddo	Murder	John B. Nauman, white	Ruffin G. Pleasant
Grover Johnson	White	23	M	November 28, 1919	Caddo	Murder-Robbery	John DeFatta, white	Ruffin G. Pleasant
Louis Werner	White	33	M	November 28, 1919	Orleans	Murder-Robbery	Frank P. Connor, white (patrolman) (Note: Also suspected of murdering detective Patrick J. Kennedy (44, white).)	Ruffin G. Pleasant

=== 1920s ===
Name	Race	Age	Sex	Date of execution	Parish	Crime	Victim(s)	Governor
Melvin Calhoun	Black		M	February 20, 1920	Madison	Murder-Robbery	N. H. Arnold, white	Ruffin G. Pleasant
Eli McGuire	Black		M	March 26, 1920	Terrebonne	Murder	Female, black (wife)	Ruffin G. Pleasant
Willie Lamerson	Black		M	May 28, 1920	West Baton Rouge	Murder	Female, black (girlfriend) (Note: Also confessed to murdering a black man in New Orleans in 1910 before his execution, but would not provide any further details.)	John Parker
Mark Peters	Black		M	July 9, 1920	Webster	Murder	Reeves family, white	John Parker
Frank Bailey	Black		M	August 13, 1920	Orleans	Murder	Theodore Obitz, white (city detective)	John Parker
Edward Doyle	White	26	M	September 17, 1920	Orleans	Murder-Robbery	Gus D. Levy, white	John Parker
Cornelius Tillman	Black	21	M	September 17, 1920	Orleans	Murder	Sidney White, black	John Parker
Laodis Lincoln	Black		M	February 25, 1921	Vermilion	Rape		John Parker
Gus Bracy	Black		M	April 22, 1921	Vernon	Rape	Female, white	John Parker
Earl Holmes	White		M	April 22, 1921	DeSoto	Murder-Robbery	Wilmer M. Roberts, white	John Parker
John Parker	White		M	April 22, 1921	DeSoto	Murder-Robbery	Wilmer M. Roberts, white	John Parker
Joe Berry	Black		M	May 6, 1921	Calcasieu	Murder	Joe Murray, black	John Parker
Charles Zalenka	White	20	M	June 17, 1921	Orleans	Murder-Robbery	Mrs. Bertha Neason, white	John Parker
Felix Birbiglia	White	22	M	June 17, 1921	Orleans	Murder-Robbery	Mrs. Bertha Neason, white	John Parker
Henry Davis	Black		M	December 30, 1921	Allen	Murder	W. B. Henson, white	John Parker
Bill Byrd	Black		M	April 20, 1922	Bienville	Murder	Mr. Murrell, white	John Parker
Robert Sewall	Black		M	October 13, 1922	DeSoto	Highway robbery	Robert M. Cook and Alma Broom, white	John Parker
Bosie Sims	Black		M	October 13, 1922	DeSoto	Highway robbery	Robert M. Cook and Alma Broom, white	John Parker
Johnson Hopkins	Black		M	April 16, 1923	St. Martin	Murder	Sam Washington, black	John Parker
Emile Jenkins	Black		M	May 18, 1923	Bossier	Murder	Josephine Johnson, black	John Parker
John Murphy	White		M	August 31, 1923	Washington	Murder	Wiley Pierce and Wesley Crain, white (deputy sheriffs)	John Parker
Walter Irwin	Black		M	November 16, 1923	West Feliciana	Murder	Male, black (inmate/guard) (Note: Serving a life sentence for murder at Angola Penitentiary and killed another black convict temporarily acting as a guard. Hanged in St. Francisville, outside of Angola.)	John Parker
Sylvester Garrett	Black		M	March 22, 1924	St. Mary	Murder	Maggie Verdun, black	John Parker
Levy James	Black		M	April 4, 1924	Avoyelles	Murder	Female, black (girlfriend)	John Parker
James Alexander	White	30	M	April 11, 1924	Claiborne	Murder	W. F. Rodgers, white	John Parker
Joseph Rini	White	24	M	May 9, 1924	Tangipahoa	Murder	Dallas Calmes, white	John Parker
Joseph Giglio	White	33	M	May 9, 1924	Tangipahoa	Murder	Dallas Calmes, white	John Parker
Andrew Lemantia	White	24	M	May 9, 1924	Tangipahoa	Murder	Dallas Calmes, white	John Parker
Joseph Bocchio	White	24	M	May 9, 1924	Tangipahoa	Murder	Dallas Calmes, white	John Parker
Roy Leona	White	36	M	May 9, 1924	Tangipahoa	Murder	Dallas Calmes, white	John Parker
Natale Deamore	White	41	M	May 9, 1924	Tangipahoa	Murder	Dallas Calmes, white	John Parker
Alton Hamilton	Black		M	August 1, 1924	Calcasieu	Murder	Daniel Borel, white	Henry L. Fuqua
Euzebe Vidrine	White	26	M	August 8, 1924	Evangeline	Murder-Robbery	Robert Leo Wiggins, 27, white (Note: Serial killer, confessed to four other murders: Pierre Vidrine on April 23, 1921 (previously acquitted), taxi driver Charles Garbo in Lafayette on December 2, 1921, Mexican John Roy between Crowley and Eunice on December 3, 1921, and oilfield worker Lee Duke between Orange and Beaumont, Texas at an unspecified date. Wiggins was killed in Ville Platte on May 19, 1924.)	Henry L. Fuqua
Willie Washington	Black		M	November 3, 1924	Jackson	Murder	E. M. Rentz, white (sheriff)	Henry L. Fuqua
Freeman Coleman	Black		M	November 3, 1924	Jackson	Murder	E. M. Rentz, white (sheriff)	Henry L. Fuqua
Booker Boone	Black		M	November 3, 1924	Jackson	Murder	E. M. Rentz, white (sheriff)	Henry L. Fuqua
Alfred Sharpe	Black	23	M	December 12, 1924	Caddo	Murder	Tom Askew, white	Henry L. Fuqua
Martin Carricut	White	33	M	March 20, 1925	Avoyelles	Murder	Anna Kohler Carricut, white (wife)	Henry L. Fuqua
Amos White	Black	20	M	March 20, 1925	Red River	Murder	Female, black (wife)	Henry L. Fuqua
J. W. Peters	Black	33	M	October 23, 1925	Calcasieu	Murder	Clara Phillips, black (wife)	Henry L. Fuqua
Howard Roberson	White	30	M	January 29, 1926	Ouachita	Murder-Robbery	Adolph Epstein, white (Note: Denied killing Epstein, but admitted to shooting a black man and D. A. Schumacher claiming self-defense. Roberson was previously a suspect in Schumacher's death.)	Henry L. Fuqua
Willie Brodes	Black	38	M	April 23, 1926	Orleans	Murder	Frank Roach, 53, white	Henry L. Fuqua
R. B. Henderson	Black	21	M	July 16, 1926	East Baton Rouge	Murder-Robbery	Claude S. Fridge and Margaret Alford, 85 (Alford), white and black (Note: Also admitted to robbing a black storekeeper, Henry Spears, and non-fatally injuring him.)	Henry L. Fuqua
Willie Johnson	Black		M	August 6, 1926	Orleans	Rape	Several females, white	Henry L. Fuqua
William Thomas	Black		M	December 31, 1926	East Carroll	Murder	Enoch and Virginia Brown, black	Oramel H. Simpson
Sam Woodard	Black	22	M	January 21, 1927	Lafayette	Murder	Three people, white (Note: Jules Guidrox, Paul Doucet, and police officer Simon Chaisson.)	Oramel H. Simpson
Ned Harvey	White		M	February 25, 1927	Cameron	Murder	John Springer, white (Note: Also killed A. A. Byrd during the same crime, but was not tried for his murder.)	Oramel H. Simpson
Jesse Tolivar	Black	22	M	August 19, 1927	Orleans	Murder	Joseph Thomas, black	Oramel H. Simpson
Hugh Phillips	White	55	M	December 20, 1927	Natchitoches	Murder	Fred DeLacerda, white	Oramel H. Simpson
Byron Dunn	White		M	January 27, 1928	Calcasieu	Murder	Sam E. Duhon, white (deputy sheriff) (Note: Officer W. E. Collins also killed.)	Oramel H. Simpson
Aaron Ray	Black	32	M	February 10, 1928	Natchitoches	Murder-Burglary	Ross Dobson, white	Oramel H. Simpson
Molton Brasseaux	White	26	M	March 9, 1928	Beauregard	Murder-Robbery	Joe Brevelle, white	Oramel H. Simpson
Joe Genna	White	26	M	March 9, 1928	Beauregard	Murder-Robbery	Joe Brevelle, white	Oramel H. Simpson
Matt Seminary	White	31	M	April 20, 1928	Orleans	Murder	Ralph Sturdy and Lillian Hoyle, white	Oramel H. Simpson
Ada LeBoeuf	White	38	F	February 1, 1929	St. Mary	Murder	James LeBoeuf, white (Ada's husband)	Huey P. Long
Thomas Dreher	White	52	M	February 1, 1929	St. Mary	Murder	James LeBoeuf, white (Ada's husband)	Huey P. Long
Lige Wall	White	56	M	March 1, 1929	Tangipahoa	Murder	Percy Roberts, 17, white	Huey P. Long
Jimmy Johnson	Black	25	M	July 26, 1929	Natchitoches	Rape	Female, white	Huey P. Long
William Virgets	Black	26	M	October 4, 1929	Orleans	Rape-Robbery	Female, white (Note: Serial rapists, attacked and robbed 20 or more women.)	Huey P. Long
Edward McKay	Black	22	M	October 4, 1929	Orleans	Rape-Robbery	Female, white	Huey P. Long

=== 1930s ===
Name	Race	Age	Sex	Date of execution	Parish	Crime	Victim(s)	Governor
Henry Wilson	Black	21	M	January 3, 1930	Richland	Rape	Female, 19, white	Huey P. Long
John Washington	Black	30	M	February 21, 1930	St. Landry	Murder	Ollie Thompson, white (police officer)	Huey P. Long
Joe Wynn	Black		M	March 7, 1930	Morehouse	Murder-Robbery	Bob Lee, 60, white	Huey P. Long
Irkson Webb	Black		M	March 7, 1930	Morehouse	Murder-Robbery	Bob Lee, 60, white	Huey P. Long
Leonard Jones	Black	30	M	June 20, 1930	Madison	Murder	Lillian Surles, white	Huey P. Long
Felix Duhart	Black	36	M	July 10, 1931	Caddo	Murder	Anna Calhoun and Eddie Smith Rucker, black	Huey P. Long
Ike Tellis	Black		M	July 10, 1931	Ouachita	Murder	Elmyra Tellis, black (wife)	Huey P. Long
Bennie White	Black	29	M	July 31, 1931	Caddo	Murder	Caleb Surrey and Bogus Connett, black	Huey P. Long
William Harper	White	42	M	August 21, 1931	Winn	Murder	Hardy C. Peppers, white	Huey P. Long
Haywood Johnson	Black	37	M	October 16, 1931	Ouachita	Murder	Female, black (wife)	Huey P. Long
Jessie Simmons	Black	20	M	October 16, 1931	Caldwell	Murder	Fred Jordan, white	Huey P. Long
Henry Hodge	Black	19	M	October 16, 1931	Caldwell	Murder	Fred Jordan, white	Huey P. Long
John Henry Lee	Black	23	M	January 29, 1932	Catahoula	Rape	Female, white	Huey P. Long
Shade Lee	Black	38	M	February 12, 1932	Orleans	Murder	Louise Greenup, 25, black	Huey P. Long
Donald Rylich	White	25	M	June 1, 1932	Orleans	Murder-Robbery	Raymond Rizzo, 39, white	O. K. Allen
George O'Day	White	23	M	June 1, 1932	Orleans	Murder-Robbery	Raymond Rizzo, 39, white	O. K. Allen
Ito Jacques	Black	28	M	June 1, 1932	Orleans	Murder-Robbery	Raymond Rizzo, 39, white	O. K. Allen
Herman Taylor	White	28	M	June 1, 1932	Orleans	Murder-Robbery	Raymond Rizzo, 39, white	O. K. Allen
Boris Tolett	White	30	M	June 1, 1932	Caddo	Murder-Robbery	Charlie Jones, white	O. K. Allen
E. L. Patterson	White	48	M	June 1, 1932	Caddo	Murder-Robbery	Charlie Jones, white	O. K. Allen
Armand Savoie	Black	43	M	June 15, 1932	St. Landry	Murder	Theodore Devalcourt, white (police officer)	O. K. Allen
Clarence Dixon	Black	38	M	August 19, 1932	Vernon	Murder	George Stephens, white	O. K. Allen
Louis Rudd	Black	30	M	September 16, 1932	Natchitoches	Murder	P. J. Ballard, white	O. K. Allen
Leaval Hubbard	Black	21	M	November 25, 1932	Orleans	Murder-Robbery	Edward Melancon, 49, white	O. K. Allen
Henry Lewis	Black	24	M	December 30, 1932	Caddo	Murder-Robbery	Arthur Williams, black	O. K. Allen
Buce Jones	Black		M	February 3, 1933	East Baton Rouge	Murder	Frank Schoonmaker, white (chief of detectives)	O. K. Allen
George Woods	Black	26	M	March 3, 1933	Calcasieu	Murder	Allan Fruge, white	O. K. Allen
Phillip Morgan	Black	42	M	March 3, 1933	Calcasieu	Murder	Robert Vincent, 38, white (Note: Also confessed to killing Vincent's wife and their three children, but was not tried for these murders.)	O. K. Allen
Sampson Carter	Black	25	M	June 30, 1933	Caddo	Murder-Robbery	W. M. Morgan, 69, white	O. K. Allen
Eli Terrell	Black		M	July 21, 1933	Orleans	Murder-Robbery	William Blumstein, 49, white (patrolman)	O. K. Allen
Thomas Franklin	Black		M	July 21, 1933	Orleans	Murder-Robbery	William Blumstein, 49, white (patrolman)	O. K. Allen
Mose Conner	Black		M	July 21, 1933	Orleans	Murder-Robbery	William Blumstein, 49, white (patrolman)	O. K. Allen
William White	Black		M	January 12, 1934	Madison	Murder	Female, black	O. K. Allen
Daniel B. Napier	White	38	M	May 18, 1934	Caddo	Murder-Rape	Mae Griffin, 16, white (Note: Suspected serial killer, after being saved from a lynch mob, Napier confessed to participating in the lynching of Leo Frank (31, white) in Georgia in 1915 and said he had escaped from a chain gang in Georgia in 1931 while serving a life sentence for raping a white girl. Napier is also suspected of murdering his stepson, Ligon Jackson (18, white) and it has been speculated that he may have been the real murderer of Mary Phagan (13, white), for whose murder Frank was convicted and later lynched.)	O. K. Allen
John Capaci	White	29	M	May 18, 1934	Jefferson	Murder-Robbery	Charles Rabito, 39, white	O. K. Allen
George Dallao	White	29	M	May 18, 1934	Jefferson	Murder-Robbery	Charles Rabito, 39, white	O. K. Allen
Willie Walton	Black	25	M	July 27, 1934	Orleans	Murder-Robbery	Roy Landry, 24, white	O. K. Allen
Roosevelt Swain	Black		M	August 31, 1934	East Baton Rouge	Murder	Alfred Harris, black (Note: Also murdered another black man, Joe Dorsey, during the same crime but was only tried for Harris's murder.)	O. K. Allen
Levi Hicks	Black		M	October 19, 1934	East Baton Rouge	Rape	Female, white	O. K. Allen
Louis Kenneth Neu	White	28	M	February 1, 1935	Orleans	Murder-Robbery	Sheffield Clark, 63, white	O. K. Allen
Cleve Cooper	Black	38	M	February 8, 1935	Caddo	Murder	Ben Thomas and J. Hollis, black	O. K. Allen
Ed Dunn	Black		M	February 8, 1935	East Carroll	Murder	Female, black (wife)	O. K. Allen
Julia Moore	Black		F	February 8, 1935	East Carroll	Murder	Ernest E. Wilson, white	O. K. Allen
Feltus Matthews	Black	21	M	June 7, 1935	West Feliciana	Murder	Francena Molux, black (half-brother's wife)	O. K. Allen
Carl Lee Dotson	Black	21	M	June 28, 1935	Tensas	Murder	Henry Jefferson, black	O. K. Allen
Richard Valentine	Black	27	M	July 10, 1936	Red River	Murder-Burglary	Effie Monroe, black (Note: Also killed her 7-year-old daughter, Ruby Lee Monroe, but apparently were not tried for this.)	Richard Leche
James Morrison	Black	24	M	July 10, 1936	Red River	Murder-Burglary	Effie Monroe, black	Richard Leche
Alex Morrison	Black	32	M	July 10, 1936	Red River	Murder-Burglary	Effie Monroe, black	Richard Leche
Johnnie Sanders	Black	20	M	January 15, 1937	Lincoln	Murder-Robbery	Sim Evans, white	Richard Leche
Tommie Howard	Black	38	M	January 15, 1937	Caddo	Attempted murder-Robbery (Note: Last execution in the United States for attempted murder.)	Daniel L. Perkins, white (Note: Previously sentenced to life imprisonment for murdering a white man in DeSoto Parish but was pardoned after serving 10 years.)	Richard Leche
Gladstone James	White	24	M	April 9, 1937	Jefferson	Murder-Robbery	Vincent N. Bologna, 27, white	Richard Leche
Ralph Eisenhardt	White	21	M	April 9, 1937	Jefferson	Murder-Robbery	Vincent N. Bologna, 27, white	Richard Leche
William Gill	Black	28	M	June 11, 1937	Caldwell	Murder	Three people, black (Note: 13-year-old stepdaughter H-Rell Hamilton, 3-year-old Roseann Gill, and 2-year-old Laura Gill. H-Rell was pregnant from "relations" William had with her and was drowned to cover up what happened; Laura and Roseann, Gill's own daughters, were also drowned as witnesses.)	Richard Leche
Robert Lucas	Black	27	M	June 11, 1937	Winn	Murder	Pearl Alexander, black	Richard Leche
Joseph Ugarte	White	27	M	January 15, 1938	Orleans	Murder-Robbery	Pierre Rizan, 61, white (Note: Also killed 26-year-old Gilbert Dietrich during the same crime.)	Richard Leche
Anthony Dallao	White	33	M	January 15, 1938	Orleans	Murder-Robbery	Pierre Rizan, 61, white	Richard Leche
Owen Cauche	White	27	M	January 15, 1938	Orleans	Murder-Robbery	Pierre Rizan, 61, white	Richard Leche
Henry Mathis	Black	24	M	October 21, 1938	West Feliciana	Murder	Male, black (inmate) (Note: Serial killer. Murder committed at Angola Penitentiary, hanged at St. Francisville; was serving time for the murder of his wife and another black man in Caddo Parish.)	Richard Leche
Elgie Stephens	Black	24	M	February 17, 1939	St. Landry	Murder	Rubelene Stephens, black (wife)	Richard Leche
Dave Johnson	Black	33	M	March 31, 1939	East Baton Rouge	Rape-Robbery	Coralee LaDue, 20, white	Richard Leche

=== 1940s ===
Name	Race	Age	Sex	Date of execution	Parish	Crime	Victim(s)	Governor
Honore Migues	White	32	M	July 19, 1940	Iberia	Murder	Evelyn Allen Crawford, 23, white	Sam Houston Jones
Antwine McClain	Black	38	M	July 26, 1940	Ouachita	Murder	Loretta Powell, black (common-law wife)	Sam Houston Jones
Charles Peyton	Black		M	August 16, 1940	Morehouse	Murder	Jessie Burks, black (common-law wife)	Sam Houston Jones
R. L. Jones	Black	27	M	October 25, 1940	Morehouse	Murder	Inez Jones, black (wife)	Sam Houston Jones
William Meharg	White	25	M	March 7, 1941	Caldwell	Murder	Frank Columbus Gartman, 45, white	Sam Houston Jones
Floyd Boyce	White	29	M	March 7, 1941	Caldwell	Murder	Frank Columbus Gartman, 45, white	Sam Houston Jones
William Heard	White	43	M	March 7, 1941	Caldwell	Murder	Frank Columbus Gartman, 45, white	Sam Houston Jones
William Landers	White	39	M	March 7, 1941	Caldwell	Murder	Frank Columbus Gartman, 45, white	Sam Houston Jones

== Electrocution ==
On June 24, 1940, the Louisiana Legislature voted 80–7 to pass a law officially replacing hanging with electrocution, and electrocution was officially adopted on August 6, 1941. Rather than establishing a single execution chamber, the state's electric chair, known as "Gruesome Gertie", was moved as needed to parishes where the condemned had been sentenced. In 1956, another law was passed which centralized executions at the state penitentiary, and the electric chair was subsequently installed in a newly built execution chamber on May 21, 1957.

Name	Race	Age	Sex	Date of execution	Parish	Crime	Victim(s)	Governor
Eugene Johnson	Black	22	M	September 11, 1941	Livingston	Murder-Robbery	Steve Bench, white	Sam Houston Jones
Austin Williams	Black	30	M	October 23, 1941	East Baton Rouge	Murder	Beatrice Purvis, 22, black (sister-in-law) (Note: Also murdered 36-year-old Olivia Poole, his common-law wife and Purvis's sister, but was apparently not charged for this.)	Sam Houston Jones
Willie Larkin	Black	31	M	September 9, 1942	Madison	Rape	Female, black (Note: Serial rapist, attacked multiple black women.)	Sam Houston Jones
Clifton Guillory	Black	20	M	September 24, 1942	Calcasieu	Murder-Robbery	Eugene Guidry, black	Sam Houston Jones
Saul Nolan	Black	31	M	October 29, 1942	West Feliciana	Murder	Edward Harrison, 66, white	Sam Houston Jones
Annie Beatrice Henry	White	26	F	November 28, 1942	Calcasieu	Murder-Robbery	Joseph P. Calloway, 42, white	Sam Houston Jones
George L. Iles	Black	22	M	December 1, 1942	Caddo	Murder	William B. Jacobs, white (Shreveport police officer)	Sam Houston Jones
William Hamilton	Black	17	M	December 3, 1942	Caddo	Rape	Female, 9, white	Sam Houston Jones
Hugh Pierre	Black	34	M	January 30, 1943	St. John the Baptist	Murder	Ignace Roussel, 65, white (constable)	Sam Houston Jones
Horace Finnon Burks	White	27	M	March 23, 1943	Calcasieu	Murder-Robbery	Joseph P. Calloway, 42, white	Sam Houston Jones
Manuel Griffin	Black	33	M	April 6, 1943	Jefferson Davis	Murder	Three people, black (Note: His common-law wife Lessie Belle Crowder, her father Isaiah Crowder, and her sister Edith Crowder.)	Sam Houston Jones
Herman Carter	Black		M	July 6, 1943	East Carroll	Murder-Robbery	Wyly B. Bursey, elderly, black	Sam Houston Jones
George Washington	Black	46	M	July 6, 1943	East Carroll	Murder	John William Murray, 41, white (deputy sheriff) (Note: Previously sentenced to life imprisonment for the murder of a black woman but released in October 1941.)	Sam Houston Jones
John Richard	Black	61	M	August 31, 1943	Iberia	Murder	Mary Ledet (ex-common-law wife) and Joseph Rice, black (Note: Serial killer, previously killed his wife in Acadia Parish and subsequently served 11 years in the state prison system.)	Sam Houston Jones
Lionel James Allen	Black	28	M	January 8, 1944	Iberia	Murder	William Butler, 40, white	Sam Houston Jones
Parker Lloyd Adams	Black	27	M	March 4, 1944	Orleans	Murder-Robbery	George A. Mansion, 55, white	Sam Houston Jones
Anthony Wilson	Black	29	M	March 6, 1944	Orleans	Rape	Female, white	Sam Houston Jones
Paul Alberts	Black	23	M	January 4, 1945	Orleans	Murder-Robbery	Aumster Dixon, 26, black	Jimmie Davis
Herbert Anderson	Black	31	M	May 25, 1945	Allen	Murder	W. H. Bishop, white (Oakdale police chief)	Jimmie Davis
Solomon Washington	Black	30	M	June 15, 1945	Morehouse	Murder	David White, white (police officer)	Jimmie Davis
Henry Riley	Black	17	M	December 7, 1945	East Baton Rouge	Murder	Mrs. Tal Cheatham Stanley, white	Jimmie Davis
George Edwards Jr.	Black	18	M	May 10, 1946	Vernon	Murder-Robbery	James Henry Roberts, 64, white	Jimmie Davis
William Ayers	Black	32	M	June 28, 1946	Winn	Rape	Female, 17, white	Jimmie Davis
Amos Batt	Black	19	M	April 11, 1947	Red River	Murder-Robbery	Thomas Elmo Cole, 32, white	Jimmie Davis
Webber Atwood	White	24	M	May 2, 1947	Tensas	Murder	Walter Mirl Tims, 45, white	Jimmie Davis
Alonzo Ellis Jones	White	28	M	May 7, 1947	St. James	Murder	Cpl. Irvin A. Pincus, 32, white (Note: Also murdered 22-year-old Walter C. Smith and wounded 21-year-old Gordon Ray during the same crime, robbing both.)	Jimmie Davis
Willie Francis	Black	18	M	May 9, 1947	St. Martin	Murder-Robbery	Andrew Thomas, white	Jimmie Davis
Donnie Mitchell	Black	49	M	May 16, 1947	St. Mary	Murder	Rivers Drexler and Stella Walker (common-law wife), black	Jimmie Davis
Henry Scott	Black	24	M	July 11, 1947	Evangeline	Murder	Archange Lafleur, white (peace officer)	Jimmie Davis
Hillery Ledet	Black	20	M	July 11, 1947	Evangeline	Murder	Artheon Fontenot, 55, black	Jimmie Davis
Jessie Perkins	Black	41	M	July 18, 1947	East Baton Rouge	Rape	Female, white	Jimmie Davis
Irvin Mattio	Black	18 (Note: Last execution in the United States for a crime committed at age 15.)	M	January 9, 1948	Orleans	Murder	Sylvain Paul Cassagne, 59, white	Jimmie Davis
Joseph Bessar Jr.	Black	20	M	April 23, 1948	Orleans	Murder-Robbery	Bernice Marie Roy, 24, white	Jimmie Davis
Wilbert Powell	Black	20	M	April 23, 1948	Orleans	Murder-Robbery	Bernice Marie Roy, 24, white	Jimmie Davis
Herbert Hopkins	Black	39	M	April 30, 1948	Assumption	Murder	Three people, black (Note: His wife Frances Hayes Hopkins and her parents Celina and Martin Hayes.)	Jimmie Davis
Edward Spriggs Jr.	Black	27	M	June 25, 1948	Iberville	Rape	Female, white	Earl K. Long
George Davis	White	33	M	April 29, 1949	Orleans	Murder	Cyril J. Reichert, 43, white (Mississippi highway patrolman)	Earl K. Long
Joseph Cook	Black	24	M	May 20, 1949	St. Landry	Murder	Albert Bernard Couvillion, 38, white (Note: Also raped a woman who was with Couvillion, and Joseph confessed to murdering an elderly white man nine years earlier.)	Earl K. Long
Matthew Cook	Black	23	M	May 20, 1949	St. Landry	Murder	Albert Bernard Couvillion, 38, white	Earl K. Long
Clarence Joseph Jr.	Black	21	M	July 14, 1950	St. Martin	Murder	Louis Barras, white	Earl K. Long
Edward Sanford	Black	43	M	December 1, 1950	East Baton Rouge	Rape	Female, white	Earl K. Long
Robert Layton	White	41	M	January 5, 1951	West Carroll	Murder	Jim Ward, 38, white	Earl K. Long
J. D. Dowdy	White	25	M	January 12, 1951	Madison	Murder	Walter N. Dorman, 44, white	Earl K. Long
Dale Smith Simpson	White	36	M	January 26, 1951	Orleans	Murder	Nicholas Jacob, 34, white (detective)	Earl K. Long
William Alleman	White	23	M	May 11, 1951	Vermilion (Note: Execution carried out in Lafayette Parish due to lack of prison facilities in Abbeville.)	Murder	Francis LeBlanc, 36, white	Earl K. Long
Edward W. J. Honeycutt	Black	24	M	June 8, 1951	St. Landry	Rape	Mrs. George Byrd, 30, white	Earl K. Long
Milton Harold Wilson	Black	40	M	July 20, 1951	St. Charles	Murder	Mr. and Mrs. Joseph Petrolia, white (Note: Also confessed to raping two black women.)	Earl K. Long
Excel Beauchamp	Black	23	M	September 7, 1951	East Feliciana	Murder-Robbery	Mrs. W. G. Wilson, 83, white	Earl K. Long
Paul Washington	Black	26	M	July 11, 1952	Jefferson	Rape	Mrs. W. P. Irwin, 48, white	Robert F. Kennon
Ocie Jugger	Black	27	M	July 11, 1952	Jefferson	Rape	Mrs. W. P. Irwin, 48, white	Robert F. Kennon
Walter Bentley	Black	30	M	September 26, 1952	Orleans	Rape-Burglary	Female, 13, white	Robert F. Kennon
John Solomon	Black	47	M	April 10, 1953	Orleans	Murder	William E. Street Sr., 53, white	Robert F. Kennon
Eddie Jackson	Black	48	M	August 14, 1953	Orleans	Murder	Frances Foster, 35, black (common-law wife)	Robert F. Kennon
Tom Johnson	Black	42	M	January 14, 1955	West Carroll	Murder	Henry Lewis, white	Robert F. Kennon
Robert Lee Sauls	Black	31	M	June 10, 1955	Calcasieu	Murder	Albert Bel Goos, 63, white (deputy sheriff)	Robert F. Kennon
Walter Palmer	Black	30	M	April 6, 1956	Tangipahoa	Murder	Merwin Kendrick, 28, white (Note: Also raped and robbed Lillie May Hemphill Ford, a white woman who was with Kendrick, but was never tried on the rape charge.)	Robert F. Kennon
John J. Michel	Black	23	M	May 31, 1957	Orleans	Rape-Robbery	Female, 15, white	Earl K. Long
James Bush	Black	27	M	June 21, 1957	Caddo	Murder-Robbery	Claude F. Bryant, 67, white	Earl K. Long
Joseph Washington	Black	34	M	June 21, 1957	Caddo	Murder-Robbery	Claude F. Bryant, 67, white	Earl K. Long
Louis Chinn	Black	31	M	July 5, 1957	West Baton Rouge	Murder-Robbery	Domenica Boeta, 64, white	Earl K. Long
Joseph O. Sheffield	White	28	M	August 16, 1957	Franklin	Murder	John L. Waller, 41, white (deputy sheriff)	Earl K. Long
Donald Rufus Edwards	Black	22	M	September 6, 1957	Caddo	Rape-Burglary	Female, white	Earl K. Long
D. C. Bailey	Black	23	M	October 11, 1957	Madison	Murder-Robbery	Edward M. Montgomery and Jesse Nelson, both 66, white	Earl K. Long
Alfred T. Facianne	Black	23	M	April 11, 1958	Tangipahoa	Murder-Robbery	Rudolph Berkeley Hano, 13, white	Earl K. Long
John G. McMiller	Black	44	M	April 11, 1958	Tangipahoa	Murder-Robbery	Rudolph Berkeley Hano, 13, white	Earl K. Long
Jasper Brazile	Black	43	M	August 15, 1958	Rapides	Murder	Floyd Lee Drewett, white	Earl K. Long
Jesse J. Ferguson	Black	39	M	June 9, 1961	St. Landry	Murder-Rape	Joyce Marie Thibodeaux, 11, black	Jimmie Davis

Two executions would take place under martial authority in Louisiana during this time: Pvt. Walter J. Bohn, a 27-year-old white man, was hanged on August 6, 1943 at Camp Claiborne in Rapides Parish for the rape of Esther E. Ruttkay, and Pvt. Clarence D. Gibson, a 25-year-old black man, was shot on September 18, 1945, at Lake Charles Army Airfield in Calcasieu Parish for the murder of Pvt. Ralph S. Heimbach, a 22-year-old white military police officer.

== See also ==
- Capital punishment in Louisiana
- Crime in Louisiana
