= Frances Williams =

Frances Williams may refer to:

- Frances Williams (composer) (1904–1978), American composer
- Frances E. Williams (1905–1995), American actress and activist
- Mary Frances Williams (born 1955), American politician
- Frances Harriet Williams (1898–1992), American activist
- Frances Williams Preston (1928–2012), American music executive
- Frances Williams (convict) (c. 1760–1801), early settler of Australia

== See also ==
- Francis Williams (disambiguation)
