= Franklin Williams =

Franklin Williams may refer to:

- Franklin Delano Williams (1947–1993), American Gospel music singer
- Franklin H. Williams (1917–1990), lawyer and civil rights leader in the United States

== See also ==
- Frank Williams (disambiguation)
