= Frank Williams (Australian footballer, born 1884) =

Australian rules footballer

Personal information
- Full name: Frank Williams
- Born: 26 October 1884
- Died: 15 April 1939 (aged 54)
- Original team: West Perth

Playing career^{1}
| Years | Club | Games (Goals) |
| 1910 | St Kilda | 5 (0) |
- ^{1} Playing statistics correct to the end of 1910.

Frank Williams (26 October 1884 – 15 April 1939) was an Australian rules footballer who played with St Kilda in the Victorian Football League (VFL).
