= Frank Williams (footballer, born 1917) =

Welsh footballer

Personal information
- Full name: Reginald Frank Williams
- Date of birth: 12 March 1917
- Place of birth: Overton-on-Dee, Wales
- Date of death: November 24, 1978 (aged 61)
- Place of death: Wrexham, Wales
- Position: Goalkeeper

Senior career*
Years	Team	Apps	(Gls)
1946–1948	Wrexham	36	(0)
1948–1949	Halifax Town	0	(0)
- * Club domestic league appearances and goals

Reginald Frank Williams (12 March 1917 – 24 November 1978) was a Welsh footballer who played as a goalkeeper for Wrexham and Halifax Town in the English Football League.

== Statistics ==
Club	Season	Division	League		FA Cup		Other		Total	
Club	Season	Division	Apps	Goals	Apps	Goals	Apps	Goals	Apps	Goals
Wrexham	1946–47	Third Division North	17	0	0	0	0	0	17	0
Wrexham	1947–48	Third Division North	19	0	1	0	0	0	20	0
Wrexham	Total		36	0	1	0	0	0	37	0
Halifax Town	1947–48	Third Division North	0	0	0	0	0	0	0	0
Career total			0	0	0	0	0	0	0	0
