= Frank Williams (Australian footballer, born 1888) =

Australian rules footballer

Personal information
- Full name: Francis Henry Williams
- Born: 24 May 1888; Carlton North, Victoria
- Died: 8 September 1959 (aged 71); Lorne, Victoria
- Original team: Royal Park Juniors

Playing career^{1}
Years	Club	Games (Goals)
1907–08	Carlton	10 (0)
- ^{1} Playing statistics correct to the end of 1908.

Francis Henry Williams (24 May 1888 – 8 September 1959) was an Australian rules footballer who played with Carlton in the Victorian Football League (VFL).
