= Frank Williams (Australian footballer, born 1914) =

Australian rules footballer

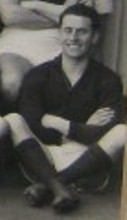

Personal information
- Full name: Francis Peter Williams
- Born: 1 October 1914
- Died: 14 July 2005 (aged 90)
- Original team: University Blacks
- Height: 177 cm (5 ft 10 in)
- Weight: 75 kg (165 lb)

Playing career^{1}
Years	Club	Games (Goals)
1936–1937	Carlton	3 (0)
1938–1939, 1941	Melbourne	4 (1)
Total		7 (1)
- ^{1} Playing statistics correct to the end of 1941.

Francis Peter Williams (1 October 1914 – 14 July 2005) was an Australian rules footballer who played with the Carlton and Melbourne in the Victorian Football League (VFL).
