= Bill B. Francis =

Finance academic

Bill B. Francis is an academic.

Francis earned a PhD in financial economics at the University of Toronto. He taught at the University of North Carolina at Charlotte and the University of South Florida, where he held the Bank of America Professorship. In 2005, Francis joined Rensselaer Polytechnic Institute's Lally School of Management as Warren H. and Pauline U. Bruggeman Distinguished Professor of Finance.
