= Willie Francis =

Execution survivor (1929–1947)

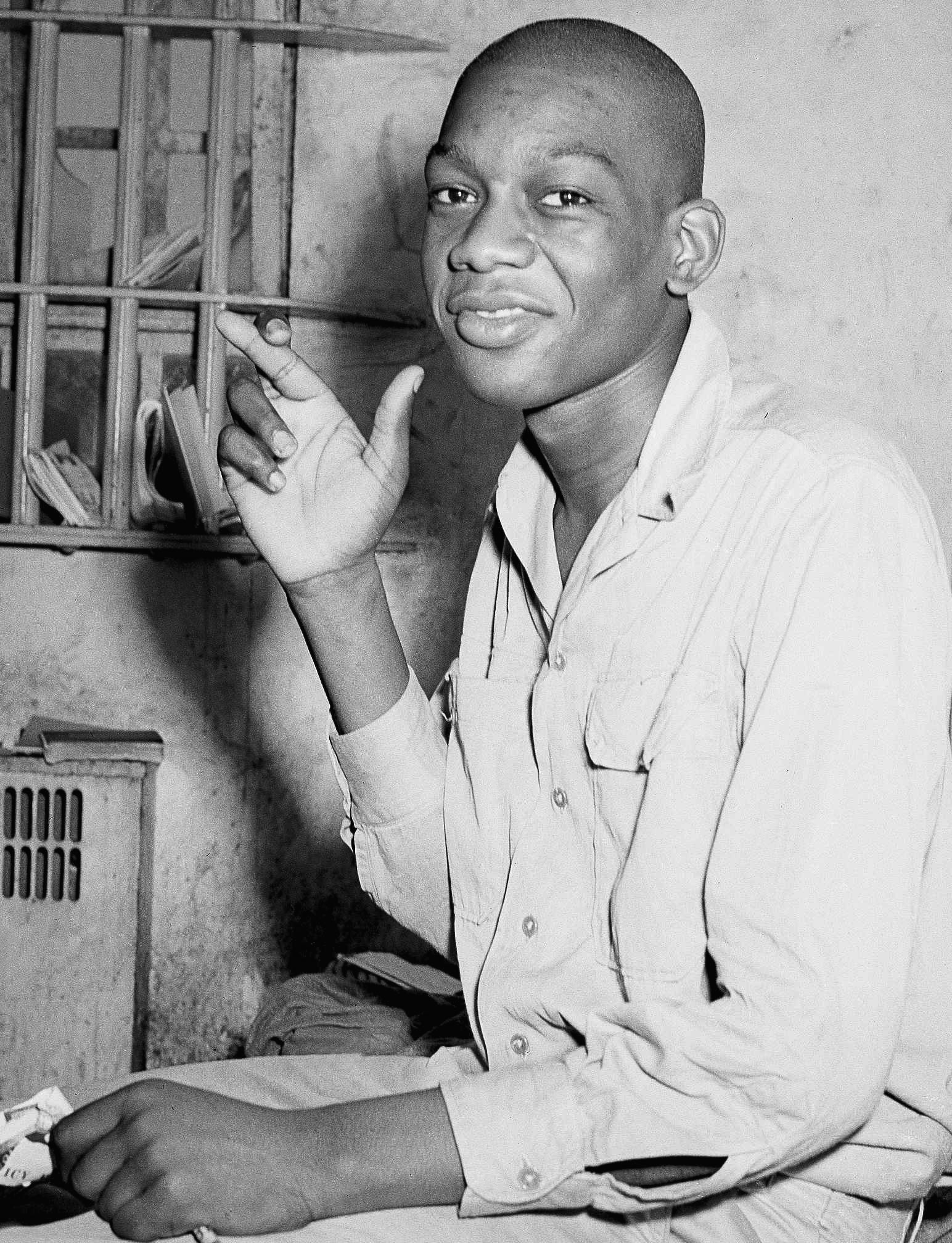
- Francis in 1946, after surviving the electric chair
- Born: January 12, 1929; St. Martinville, Louisiana, U.S.
- Died: May 9, 1947 (aged 18); St. Martinville, Louisiana, U.S.
- Cause of death: Execution by electrocution
- Known for: First known incident of a failed execution by electrocution in the United States
- Conviction: First degree murder
- Penalty: Death

Willie Francis (January 12, 1929 – May 9, 1947) was an American teenager known for surviving an attempted execution by electrocution in the United States. He was sentenced to death at age 16 by the state of Louisiana in 1945 for the murder of Andrew Thomas, a pharmacy owner in St. Martinville who had once employed him. Francis was 17 when he survived the first attempt to execute him, as the chair malfunctioned. Following an unsuccessful appeal of his case to the U.S. Supreme Court, he was executed in 1947 at age 18.

== Arrest and trial ==
In December 1944, Andrew Thomas, a pharmacist in St. Martinville, Louisiana, was shot and killed. His murder remained unsolved for nine months, but on August 3, 1945, Willie Francis was detained near a train station in Port Arthur, Texas, on suspicion of drug trafficking. The police were waiting for a suspected drug dealer. When a suspicious-looking man with a suitcase got off the train, the two officers pursued him. At that time, Francis, who was visiting his sister's home, took a stroll around the block. When Francis saw the two officers running his way, he attempted to hide. The officers noticed Francis, whose stutter drew further suspicion. Assuming that Francis was an accomplice of the suspected drug dealer, they took him into custody.

Francis was able to convince the police that he was not involved in any drug trafficking. However, Francis again drew suspicion when the police found that his wallet contained an identification card belonging to Andrew Thomas. After being questioned about it, Francis made a written confession to the murder of Thomas. He made a second written confession to the murder while being transported back to Louisiana. Francis also confessed to the assault and robbery of an elderly man named William Smith in an alley in Port Arthur.

Francis led the police to a jewelry store where he said he had sold a watchcase stolen from Thomas. The owner claimed he did not remember Francis, although his records documented the purchase.

Francis initially claimed that two other young black men had helped him commit the murder, but the police dismissed these claims. In his first confession to Thomas' murder, Francis wrote, "It was a secret about me and him." The meaning of his statement is still uncertain, and it remains unclear who Francis was referring to. Francis's first confession claimed he stole the gun used to kill Thomas from August Fuselier, a deputy sheriff in St. Martinville. However, it has been alleged that Francis actually did have accomplices in the murder and that Fuselier was one of them. Fuselier claimed that his gun was stolen, but there is no evidence that any report was made. Fuselier had also once threatened to kill Thomas. The gun, and the bullets recovered from the crime scene and Thomas' body, disappeared from police evidence just before the trial.

Author Gilbert King, in his book The Execution of Willie Francis (2008), described the trial of Francis as "a travesty of justice," although he conceded that Francis himself consistently maintained that he was guilty of the murder. Bertrand DeBlanc, the attorney who later represented Francis while attempting to prevent a second attempt to execute him, said Francis never denied his guilt.

Francis pleaded guilty. During his trial, the court-appointed defense attorneys offered no objections and called no witnesses, although they did make a closing argument. The validity of Francis's confessions was not questioned by the defense. Two days after the trial began, Francis was found guilty of first degree murder after 15 minutes of deliberation and the judge imposed the mandatory death sentence.

King said that Francis's motive for the murder remained unclear. Francis never gave one. King alluded to rumors in St. Martinville of sexual abuse of the youth by the pharmacist. During an interview shortly after he survived his first execution attempt, however, Francis described Thomas as a good boss and a "swell guy". He said he did not know why he killed Thomas, but that "I wasn't after money." Francis also said he was sorry that he killed Thomas.

At one point, Francis wrote on the wall of his cell, "Practically I killed Andrew by accident. It will happen once in a life time."

== Execution attempt, appeal, and second execution ==
On May 3, 1946, Francis survived an attempt at execution by the electric chair. Witnesses reported hearing him screaming from behind the leather hood, "Take it off! Take it off! Let me breathe!" as the supposedly lethal surge of electricity was being applied. The portable electric chair, known as "Gruesome Gertie", was found to have been improperly set up by an intoxicated prison guard and inmate from the Louisiana State Penitentiary at Angola. The sheriff, E. L. Resweber, was later quoted as saying, "This boy really got a shock when they turned that machine on."

After the botched execution, attorney Bertrand DeBlanc decided to take Francis's case. He felt it was unjust, and cruel and unusual punishment, which is prohibited in the Constitution, to subject him again to the execution process. DeBlanc had been best friends with Thomas, and his decision was greeted with dismay by the citizens in the small Cajun town. DeBlanc took Francis's case to the Supreme Court in Francis v. Resweber, 329 U.S. 459 (1947), citing various violations of his Fifth, Eighth, and Fourteenth Amendment rights. These included violations of equal protection, double jeopardy, and cruel and unusual punishment. The appeal was unsuccessful. After learning about the ruling, a reporter asked Francis if he could handle the decision. Francis replied, "I'm sure I can. I had the nerve to kill a man, so I guess I can take it."

The Louisiana Board of Pardons rejected a request by DeBlanc to commute Francis's death sentence. In desperation, DeBlanc sought to obtain a new trial for Francis. However, his efforts were unsuccessful.

Although Francis supported DeBlanc's efforts to spare his life, he said he was always willing to be executed for his crimes. In response to DeBlanc despairing over his failure to save Francis, Francis told him "to let it go" because he was "ready to die".

Subsequently, Willie Francis was returned to the electric chair on May 9, 1947. He told reporter Elliott Chaze a couple of days prior to the execution that he was going to meet the Lord with his "Sunday pants and Sunday heart". He was pronounced dead in the chair at 12:10 p.m. (Central Time).

== In popular media ==
Ernest Gaines' 1993 novel A Lesson Before Dying, telling the story of a young black man facing execution in 1940s Louisiana, was partly based on the Willie Francis case.

== See also ==
- Capital punishment in Louisiana
- List of people executed in Louisiana (pre-1972)
- List of people executed in the United States in 1947
- Capital punishment in the United States
- John Babbacombe Lee
- Joseph Samuel
- Christa Pike

== Bibliography ==
- King, Gilbert (2008). The Execution of Willie Francis: Race, Murder and the Search for Justice in the American South. Basic Civitas Books.
- Miller, Arthur S.; Bowman, Jeffrey H. (1988). Death by Installments: The Ordeal of Willie Francis. New York.
