= Frank Williams (cricketer) =

New Zealand cricketer (1876–1946)

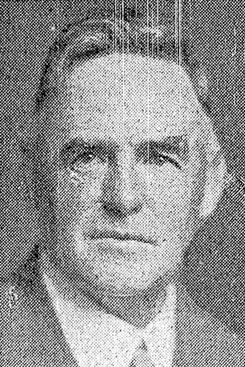
- Frank Williams in 1930

Personal information
- Born: 1876; Bath, Somerset, England
- Died: 17 July 1946 (aged 69–70); Dunedin, Otago, New Zealand
- Role: Wicket-keeper

Domestic team information
- Years: Team
- 1898/99–1908/09: Otago

Career statistics
Competition	First-class
Matches	26
Runs scored	297
Batting average	8.25
100s/50s	0/0
Top score	39
Catches/stumpings	32/16
- Source: CricInfo, 21 August 2019

Frank Williams (1876 – 17 July 1946) was a New Zealand cricketer. He played 26 first-class matches as a wicket-keeper for Otago between the 1898–99 and 1908–09 seasons.

Williams was born at Bath in England in 1876. He played for the Albion club in Dunedin, where he served on the committee, and first represented Otago in a match against Southland during the 1895–96 season. He made his first-class debut for the provincial side against Canterbury in December 1898 and went on to play 26 times in first-class matches for Otago.

Considered a "crack" wicket-keeper, Williams effected 48 first-class dismissals and was selected to keep wickets for South Island against North Island in 1901–02. Not considered much of a "recognised batsman", he scored a total of 295 first-class runs with a highest score of 39 runs, although in club cricket he batted in a "vigorous manner", this likely leading to his nickname of "Bash". He was Otago's first-choice wicket-keeper for 11 seasons, playing his final first-class match in February 1909.

After his playing career was over, Williams stood as an umpire, including in first-class matches. He served on the committee of the Otago Cricket Association, was a selector for Otago teams, and was one of the selectors who chose the New Zealand teams that toured England in 1927 and 1931.

In later life Williams took up lawn bowls and was a member of the St Kilda club in Dunedin. Professionally he worked as a tailor and operated a shop in Dunedin until his retirement. He died at Dunedin in 1946 leaving two sons and a daughter.
