= Francis Williams (politician) =

American politician

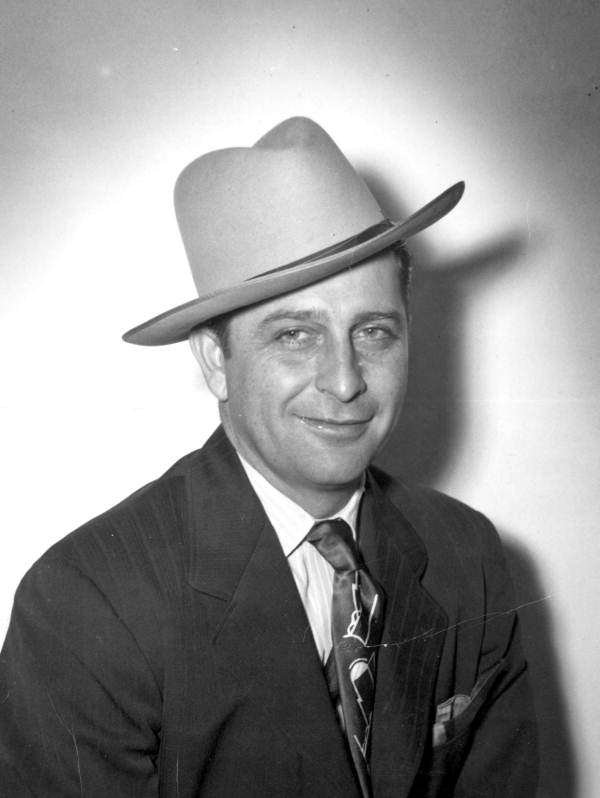
- Williams in 1951

Member of the Florida House of Representatives from Citrus County
- In office 1951

Personal details
- Born: November 20, 1914
- Died: February 3, 1999 (aged 84)
- Party: Democratic

Francis Williams (November 20, 1914 – February 3, 1999) was an American politician. He served as a Democratic member of the Florida House of Representatives.

Williams died on February 3, 1999, at the age of 84.
