= Frank Williams (footballer, born 1921) =

English footballer

Personal information
- Date of birth: 23 May 1921
- Place of birth: Halifax, West Yorkshire, England
- Date of death: 1999 (aged 77–78)
- Position: Winger

Senior career*
Years	Team	Apps	(Gls)
1946–1947	Boothstown		
1947–1948	Halifax Town	4	(0)
1948–19??	Bacup Borough		
- * Club domestic league appearances and goals

Frank Williams (23 May 1921 – 1999) was an English footballer who played as a winger for Halifax Town in the Football League.

== Statistics ==
Appearances and goals by club, season and competition
Club	Season	League			FA Cup		Other		Total	
Club	Season	Division	Apps	Goals	Apps	Goals	Apps	Goals	Apps	Goals
Halifax Town	1947–48	Third Division North	4	0	0	0	0	0	4	0
Career total			4	0	0	0	0	0	4	0
