= Billy Frank (cricketer) =

South African cricketer (1872–1945)

Cricket information
- Batting: Right-handed
- Bowling: Right-arm medium

International information
- National side: South Africa
- Only Test: 2 March 1896 v England

Career statistics
| Competition | Test |
|---|---|
| Matches | 1 |
| Runs scored | 7 |
| Batting average | 3.50 |
| 100s/50s | 0/0 |
| Top score | 5 |
| Balls bowled | 58 |
| Wickets | 1 |
| Bowling average | 52.00 |
| 5 wickets in innings | 0 |
| 10 wickets in match | 0 |
| Best bowling | 1/52 |
| Catches/stumpings | 0/– |
- Source: Cricinfo, 13 November 2022

William Hughes Bowker Frank (23 November 1872 – 16 February 1945) was a South African cricketer who played in one Test in 1896.
