= Larry Williams (disambiguation) =

Larry Williams (1935–1980) was an American rhythm and blues and rock and roll singer.

Larry Williams may also refer to:

== Arts and entertainment ==
- Larry Williams (director), co-director of the TV movie Brave New World
- Larry Williams (horn player), American horn player; see Brian Wilson
- Larry Williams (jazz musician), member of Seawind and keyboardist for Al Jarreau
- Larry E. Williams, composer of "Let Your Love Flow"
- Larry R. Williams (born 1942), publisher and promoter of trading ideas and father of actress Michelle Williams

== Sports ==
- Larry Williams (American football) (1963–2025), American football offensive guard and athletic director
- Larry Williams (basketball), (born 1981) streetball basketball player
- Larry Williams Jr. (born 1985), American football defensive back
- Larry Demetrius Williams (born 1988), American basketball player
- Larry "Wheels" Williams (born 1994), American powerlifter

== Others ==
- Larry Williams (politician) (born 1943), member of the West Virginia House of Delegates
- Larry Williams, convicted of manslaughter in relation to the death of Hana Grace-Rose Williams

== See also ==
- Laurie Williams (disambiguation)
- Lawrence Williams (disambiguation)
