= Lawrence Williams =

Lawrence Williams or Laurence Williams may refer to:

- Lawrence G. Williams (1913–1975), American politician
- Lawrence P. Williams (1905–1996), British motion picture art director
- Lawrence Williams (American football), American football player
- Lawrence Williams (baseball) (born 1933), American Negro league baseball player
- Lawrence Williams (cricketer) (1946–2023), Welsh former cricketer
- Lawrence Williams (songwriter), American songwriter and roadie
- Lawrence Williams (writer), co-writer of The Monster Maker
- L. F. Rushbrook Williams (Laurence Frederic Rushbrook Williams, 1890–1978), British historian and civil servant
- Laurence Williams (nuclear engineer) (born 1946), British nuclear power safety expert and academic
- Lawrence Williams (banker) (c. 1955–2014), Guyanese banking official

== See also ==
- Larry Williams (disambiguation)
- Laurie Williams (disambiguation)
