= Murder of Nubia Barahona =

Murder of an American girl

Nubia Barahona
- Born: Nubia Docter; May 26, 2000
- Died: February 11, 2011 (aged 10)
- Cause of death: Homicide by beating
- Body discovered: February 14, 2011 I-95 West Palm Beach, Florida, U.S.
- Parent(s): Jorge and Carmen Barahona (adoptive); Victor Bustillo and Sandra K. Docter (biological)
- Relatives: Victor Barahona (twin brother)

Nubia Docter Barahona was a 10-year-old American girl who was abused and murdered on February 11, 2011. Her body was found February 14, 2011, wrapped in a plastic garbage bag in the bed of her adoptive father's pickup truck on the side of I-95 in West Palm Beach, Florida. Her body had partially decomposed from being covered in chemicals, possibly pesticides.

Her twin brother, Victor Docter Barahona, was in the cab of the truck with his father, suffering seizures from chemical burns and inhalation of toxic gas. Her adoptive parents Jorge and Carmen Barahona were indicted on charges of first-degree murder, aggravated child abuse and child neglect on March 23, 2011. They face the death penalty if convicted, and are currently being held while awaiting trial.

The case has sparked outrage from Florida citizens and officials regarding the Florida Department of Children and Families' handling of previous allegations of abuse by the Barahonas.

== Background ==
Fraternal twins Nubia and Victor Docter were born on May 26, 2000, in Spokane, Washington, to Sandra K. Docter, a mother with drug and alcohol abuse issues. Their mother had borne four children before them, all of whom had been taken from her by the Department of Children and Families (DCF). Nubia was born with congenital adrenal hyperplasia. It was recommended she be placed in a medical foster home, but she was instead allowed to stay with her biological mother, who claimed to be sober.

The twins were removed from their mother's care in 2003 and placed with their father, Victor Bustillo, but they did not stay with him long. In 2004 he was charged with sexual battery of a child not in his care. The twins were placed in foster care, and eventually ended up in the home of Jorge and Carmen Barahona in Miami, Florida. The couple had already adopted an autistic boy. Jorge owned a pest control business; Carmen was a homemaker. Just months after being placed with the Barahonas, a nurse noted that Nubia was missing medical appointments because the Barahonas did not wish to accompany her to these, despite the appointments being required to manage Nubia's ongoing condition. The nurse recommended that the Barahonas not be allowed to adopt the children.

In 2005, Nubia reportedly told someone at her school that her father was molesting her. Unclear on whether she had meant her birth father or her foster father, DCF investigated. They determined that she had meant her birth father and the case was closed. Then, in 2006, school staff called DCF to report a large bruise on Nubia's face that they suspected was child abuse. The Barahonas were ordered to bring her to an appointment with the Department of Health's Child Protection Team in Miami, but did not show up until a week later. By then, most of the bruising had disappeared and state doctors agreed with the Barahonas' assertion that the bruise was from a fall.

Further complaints were filed in 2007: school authorities reported that Nubia was extremely thin, always hungry, and had an unpleasant odor. DCF investigated the claims, but were met with insistence from the Barahonas that Nubia's condition was not from hygiene problems or neglect, but caused by her medical condition. The investigation was dropped.

The Barahonas began the adoption process of the twins in 2008, but were met with resistance from the twins' guardian ad litem, Paul Neumann. They claimed Neumann was operating "behind [their] backs", unfairly interfering with their adoption attempt. They claimed they had a "personality conflict" with Neumann and cited that as the reason he was accusing them of neglect. To override him, the Barahonas wrote letters appealing to people as high up as then-governor Charlie Crist. In these letters, the Barahonas described the care that they were providing to the twins positively, stating that they were "raising [their] children with love, as any mother and father would do." Neumann was removed as the twins' guardian ad litem without explanation shortly before the adoption was finalized.

The twins were formally adopted in May 2009. In 2010, complaints similar to the ones in 2007 were again raised by school authorities, this time adding that Nubia was losing her hair. DCF was met with the same reasoning from the Barahonas—that it was caused by her endocrine condition and medication she was taking for it—and the investigation was dropped again.

== "Toxic Truck" ==
At 5:00 a.m. on Monday, February 14, 2011, a Road Ranger noticed a red Toyota pickup truck on the shoulder of northbound I-95 between Palm Beach Lakes Boulevard and 45th Street in West Palm Beach. When the truck was still there two and a half hours later, he called the police.

West Palm Beach Fire Rescue responded to the call and found 53-year-old Jorge Barahona on the ground and 10-year-old Victor Barahona in the cab of the truck. Both were conscious by the time rescuers arrived, but Victor was convulsing with seizures. One fireman was overcome by a strong smell when approaching the truck, and decontamination procedures were started. The bed of the truck was full of plastic containers of chemicals, some unlabeled. The truck was branded with the name of Jorge's pest extermination business, CJ Pest Control, causing investigators to believe the chemicals were pesticides. One unlabeled container held some form of acid, causing firefighters to wonder why an exterminator would have such a chemical. State Troopers were sent to the address of CJ Pest Control, but were unable to contact anyone.

Further investigation revealed that Victor was covered in acid, and there was so much of it in the car that it soaked the carpet and seats, making the air around the truck poisonous. Victor and Jorge were taken to separate hospitals for their injuries. A city hazmat team and the state Department of Environmental Protection arrived by the afternoon to decontaminate the area. At about 3:45 p.m., a DEP contractor sorting through tubs of chemicals in the bed of the truck found a black garbage bag. Inside were human remains.

FBI investigators joined the effort to decontaminate the site to clear the way for county forensics investigators to examine the body. At about 8:30 p.m. Tuesday the body was taken to the medical examiner's office for an autopsy. The identity of the body was withheld from the public for two days after its discovery, then revealed to be that of Nubia Barahona, Victor's twin sister. Her body was badly decomposed and difficult to identify, as it had been covered with acid and other hazardous chemicals.

== Investigation ==
Victor was initially taken to nearby St. Mary's Medical Center (West Palm Beach, Florida), then transferred two days later to Jackson Memorial Hospital's burn center in Miami. He had suffered "severe internal reactions" to the inhalation of toxic fumes in the truck, and had chemical burns over large portions of his body. Doctors also found several previous injuries to the boy, including a broken collarbone, broken arm, scars on his buttocks and lower abdomen, and rope marks on both wrists. Victor was finally released on March 2, 2011, and placed in a therapeutic foster home.

Jorge was arrested on child abuse charges against Victor and moved from Columbia Hospital (West Palm Beach) to the Palm Beach County jail on February 16. While in custody, he confessed to police that he had been upset by the death of his daughter and had driven to Palm Beach County with the plan to commit suicide by setting himself on fire. He said the shoulder of I-95 was chosen so that he would be "easily found". He claimed he gave Victor a handful of sleeping pills, then, with the boy's head in his lap, poured gasoline over his own head. He then attempted to ignite a lighter, but could not do it, as he did not want to take Victor with him. Investigators found a red gasoline container in the truck filled with acid. When asked by police why he did not have as many obvious burns as Victor, Jorge said that some of the gas must have splashed the boy. The police concluded that Jorge's version of events was inconsistent with the boy's injuries.

Autopsy results concluded that Nubia was beaten to death on February 11, the day a DCF official came to investigate a call to their abuse hotline. According to the police report, Jorge allegedly "repeatedly punched and beat Nubia" who "screamed and cried until she was dead".

Carmen Barahona, Jorge's wife, told investigators when questioned that she and her husband had been separated for six months, when in fact they had never been apart. The couple's other two children were taken from the home and placed with Carmen's parents, then placed in foster care.

=== A "family secret" ===
On February 10, 2011, four days before Jorge Barahona's truck was found on the side of the road, the therapist of Carmen Barahona's granddaughter, Alessandra, placed a call to child welfare officials. Alessandra had alleged to her therapist that while visiting her grandmother's house, twins Nubia and Victor were bound by their hands and feet and made to stand for hours in a bathtub. Their hands were unbound only when it was time to eat, she claimed, and she also alleged that she was not permitted to speak to them when she used the bathroom. The therapist told the operator that Alessandra felt threatened by her grandmother to keep quiet. Carmen allegedly told Alessandra not to tell people about how the twins were treated because it was a "family secret".

The couple's 11-year-old autistic son, Jorge, also tried to tell a DCF investigator visiting the home shortly before Nubia's death about a "secret", but the investigator claimed Carmen dismissed him as "low-functioning" and told him to watch TV in another room.

After the discovery of Nubia's body, Alessandra was removed from the care of her mother, Jennifer Perez, and placed with her father, Yovani Perez. In addition, a judge ordered that neither the girl's mother nor any member of her family have any contact with the girl. A DCF official stated that Alessandra should no longer be with her mother because "the mother, Jennifer Perez, not only psychologically abused the child by exposing her to the torture of the twins, but also by threatening the child over and over to keep quiet and encourage her to be complicit in the deception ... including a calculated effort by the mother to keep the child from disclosing it to DCF officials."

=== Role of DCF ===
The Florida Department of Children and Families has been heavily criticized for their handling of the Barahona case. Judge Cindy Lederman expressed outrage at the actions of Andrea Fleary, a DCF worker assigned to the case. On Thursday, February 10, Fleary visited the Barahona home to investigate an abuse hotline call, but despite not making contact with the children, she reported they were safe. When Fleary told the judge about 11-year-old Jorge's attempts to alert her to abuse on Friday, she said the conversations had taken place late in the evening. Judge Lederman responded "So we don't do investigations on weekends? Is that what you are telling me?" Fleary responded that she had stopped her investigation at 9:00 p.m. because "we don't do investigations on weekends."

DCF Secretary David Wilkins defended Fleary, claiming she was rattled during the hearing and that "[w]e do investigations 24/7 ... We have employees who work weekends. We have employees who work nights." Fleary was first placed on paid administrative leave, then fired. When asked how they could have ignored signs of Nubia's abuse, such as her hair loss and constant hunger, Wilkins stated that "[t]he medical conditions of the children complicated the decision-making of our investigators". Wilkins also reminded critics that "these people have been deceiving the system for quite a long time". In response to the Docter twins being adopted despite objections from their guardian ad litem Paul Neumann, head of Miami-Dade County's guardian ad litem program Sonia Ferrer said the program did everything it could at the time despite admitting Neumann had concerns. She said that the judge overseeing the adoption had heard other evidence and decided to place them with the Barahonas.

Wilkins called upon David Lawrence Jr., former publisher of The Miami Herald and current president of the Children's Movement of Florida, Bobby Martinez, a former U.S. Attorney in South Florida, and James Sewell, former assistant commissioner of the Florida Department of Law Enforcement and chair of the task force that investigated the 2009 death of Broward County foster child Gabriel Myers, to look into the handling of the Barahona case. The panel subsequently called DCF's handling of the case "inept" and a "failure of common sense and listening".

Wilkins, who had only been DCF secretary for a few months at the time of Nubia's death, has also criticized the organization's abuse hotline, comparing it to a "low-cost call center". Regarding a call reporting the Barahonas, Wilkins said "[t]hey have a low-cost call center mentality ... You don't want to get off the phone in this situation ... you could tell the operator wanted to get off the phone because he's measured by how long his call is." Employees are rated by how quickly they handle calls because in the past they had been criticized for taking too long to answer calls, causing callers to hang up. Wilkins also claims the technology is outdated, making it difficult to piece together different parts of a case from separate calls. He claimed to have plans to remedy these situations.

== Charges and trial ==
After being informed he had to attend a hearing on a felony child abuse charge, Jorge Barahona tried twice to injure himself. He first jumped backward off a sink in his cell, landing on his head. He was examined and declared competent to stand before a judge, but refused to cooperate with deputies and did not show up for the hearing. At the hearing, his bail was set for $1 million. He later attempted again to injure himself and was taken to a hospital for a CT scan, then returned to jail and placed in the mental health unit.

Carmen Barahona filed for divorce from Jorge in late February, but was arrested and charged with first-degree murder on March 5. She was held without bond.

Jorge and Carmen Barahona together have been indicted on eighteen charges: one count of first-degree murder, eight counts of child abuse resulting in great bodily harm, one count of child neglect resulting in great harm, six counts of child neglect (no great harm), one count of child neglect (no great bodily harm), and one count of mutilating a dead body. They face the death penalty if convicted.

The Barahonas have both pleaded not guilty to first-degree murder and child abuse charges. Jorge Barahona's trial on the murder of Nubia and the attempted murder of Victor was set to begin on September 28, 2015.

In January 2016, Circuit Judge Samantha Schosberg Feuer set the case for jury selection to start July 25. The case was set to begin in September 2015, but the Barahonas' attorneys requested more time. Prosecutors are seeking the death penalty for the couple.

The Barahonas' granddaughter, who wished not to be identified, came forward and described the abuse as "a persistent pattern of psychological and physical abuse." She was six years old when the twins arrived at the Barahonas' home. The granddaughter was a regular visitor and witnessed the torture of the twins, even stating that "the twins would be stripped naked and forced to walk around the living room." Jorge Barahona forced everyone to watch the naked twins. Another time during the granddaughter's visit, Jorge tried to drown Victor in the swimming pool and at another time, Jorge and Carmen wrapped rope around Victor's neck, choking him "until he fainted". The granddaughter also said that the twins were only given milk and bread to eat.

In April 2017, Victor Barahona received US$3.75 million as part of a settlement with the Florida Department of Children and Families. The state's government said the department "poorly handled the case of the Barahona twins" and that the department "had many red flags they did not pay attention to".

On February 21, 2020, Carmen Barahona pleaded guilty to first-degree murder and multiple counts of aggravated child abuse. She also agreed to testify against Jorge as part of a plea deal. Her sentencing has been deferred until her cooperation with prosecutors against Jorge is complete. If she does not fully cooperate, she could still face the death penalty.

== Trial delays ==
On February 26, 2020, lawyers for Jorge Barahona requested his trial date be delayed due to Carmen's plea deal. On March 1, 2021, Barahona was attacked in the Pre-Trial Detention Center as he slept and suffered multiple bruises on his face, a nosebleed, and a small cut on his nose. He was attacked by five other inmates because "of the nature of his pending charges," according to a police report.

In August 2021, Barahona fired his legal team and continued to ask for postponements.

In February 2024, a court hearing about whether he is competent to stand trial was again reset. A local news station reported that, after 13 years, it is a "case that is still nowhere near trial" because "judges and attorneys have changed for years (and)... Jorge Barahona continues to ask for postponements." Gail Levine, the case's original prosecutor, who is now retired, said that "Due to judges' calendars, due to the defense, and the attorney's decision to go to trial on other cases, Jorge Barahona's case took a backseat".

In July 2025, Barahona was ruled competent to stand trial. As of October 1, 2025, the court was evaluating Barahona's options for legal representation. In September 2026, a trial date of March 15, 2027 was set.

== See also ==
- Child abuse
- Filicide
- Death of Jeffrey Baldwin
- Murder of Victoria Climbié
- Death of Nathaniel Craver
- Murder of Erica Parsons
- Murder of Lydia Schatz
- Death of Hana Grace-Rose Williams
