= Joel Steinberg =

American lawyer convicted of manslaughter

- Steinberg in 1987
- Born: Joel Barnet Steinberg; May 25, 1941 (age 85)
- Education: New York University School of Law
- Alma mater: Fordham University
- Occupation: Criminal defense attorney (formerly)
- Years active: c. 1965–1987
- Known for: Conviction of manslaughter in the death of illegally adopted child.
- Status: Released
- Conviction: Manslaughter
- Criminal charge: Second-degree murder
- Penalty: 8⅓ to 25 years in prison
- Accomplice: Hedda Nussbaum (1975–1987)

Details
- Victims: 1 (Lisa Launders)
- Date: November 1, 1987
- Date apprehended: November 2, 1987

Joel Barnet Steinberg (born May 25, 1941) is a disbarred American attorney from New York City who attracted international media attention when he was accused of child abuse and murder for the beating and subsequent death of a six-year-old girl, Elizabeth ("Lisa") Launders. Steinberg and his live-in partner, Hedda Nussbaum, had illegally adopted the girl. Nussbaum was granted immunity for her testimony, and Steinberg was convicted of manslaughter in November 1987 and paroled in 2004.

== Early life ==
Joel Steinberg was raised in the Bronx and Yonkers, New York in a Jewish family. After graduating from Fordham University in 1962, he attended New York University Law School but was dropped in 1964, and joined the U.S. Air Force the following year. Following his military career, he returned to law school, and was admitted to the bar in New York. Due to the ongoing Vietnam War, lawyers whose studies were interrupted by conscription were exempted from the bar exam requirement, if they met certain conditions.

== Background ==
Steinberg shared a Greenwich Village, Manhattan apartment at 14 West 10th Street with his live-in partner and common-law wife, Hedda Nussbaum. Steinberg worked as a lawyer, specializing in arranging adoptions.

The couple also raised two illegally adopted children, six-year-old Lisa and 16-month-old Mitchell. Steinberg had been hired by a single mother named Michelle Launders to locate a suitable adoptive family for Lisa. Launders had paid Steinberg $500, requesting that Lisa be placed in a Roman Catholic family. Steinberg reportedly found a family, but the adoption fell through when they refused to pay $50,000 for the baby. Steinberg decided to take Lisa to live with him and Nussbaum, but never filed formal adoption papers, and the child was not legally adopted.

Mitchell had also been illegally adopted, with the child being recommended to them by Dr. Peter Sarosi, who had previously treated Nussbaum for infertility. Nicole Smigiel, the boy's birth mother, was 16 years old at the time. She allowed the doctor and an attorney to handle the adoption. However, papers were never filed, and no payments were made, causing the adoption of Mitchell to be ruled illegal.

The relationship between Steinberg and Nussbaum was fraught, with neighbors regularly phoning police during their 13-year relationship to report that Steinberg beat Nussbaum. Friends urged Nussbaum to leave Steinberg. On previous visits, police found Nussbaum hiding in a closet, and refusing to come out. Neighbors also reported suspected child abuse, and investigators twice visited the apartment but no charges came of these encounters. Nussbaum suffered multiple broken bones over the last 10 years of her relationship with Steinberg, with the heaviest attacks occurring in the last five years the couple was together. Her nose had been broken several times, and she had cauliflower ears as a result of the beatings.

== Murder of Lisa Steinberg ==
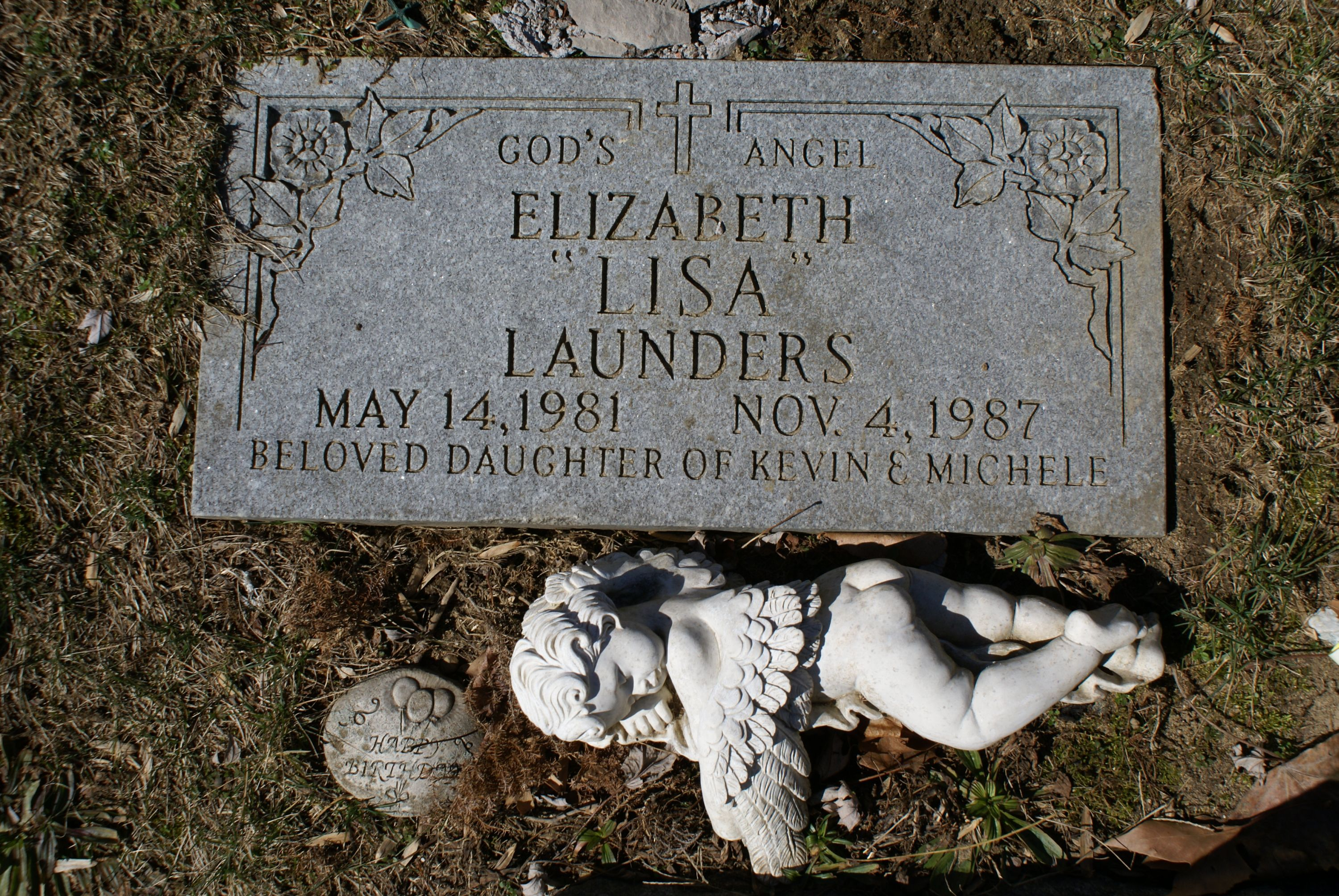
The grave of Lisa Launders in Gate of Heaven Cemetery.

Steinberg was under the influence of crack cocaine when he hit Lisa on the head on November 1, 1987. After the attack, he left the apartment for a dinner appointment with a friend. When he returned, he refused to help the child and instead freebased cocaine for the next several hours. The couple called an ambulance the next morning, with Steinberg telling authorities that Lisa had thrown up the previous evening and may have swallowed some of the vomit. Upon her admission to Saint Vincent's Hospital, doctors found that Lisa had bleeding to the brain, and bruising on her head and spine. Medical staff informed the police, who visited Steinberg's Greenwich Village apartment.

The police found the apartment in a squalid state, with excrement and garbage strewn around, and no working lights. Cocaine, hashish and marijuana were found, along with $25,000 in cash and traveler's checks, leading police to believe the couple had been dealing drugs. They also discovered another adopted child, 16-month-old Mitchell. He had been tied to his playpen and had only a mat to sleep on. The police took him to St. Vincent's Hospital, who discharged him, stating he was in good health. He was later placed in foster care.

In addition to Steinberg's assault on Lisa, Nussbaum showed signs of physical abuse at Steinberg's hands. She was admitted to a prison hospital, to treat nine broken ribs, a broken nose, and gangrene on her leg. The gangrene was so serious doctors considered amputating the limb.

Lisa remained in the hospital for three days before being diagnosed as brain dead. She died after her life support was removed. Her birth mother, Michelle Launders, went to court to obtain the right to bury Lisa, stating she did not want the child to be buried by the same people who killed her. The judge ruled in her favor, due to Lisa never having been legally adopted. She was buried on Long Island with over 1,000 people attending the funeral.

== Murder trial ==
Steinberg pleaded not guilty to Lisa's murder in November 1987, and was arraigned on charges of manslaughter, counts of endangering the welfare of a child, and charges of second-degree murder.

In exchange for testifying against Steinberg, Nussbaum was not prosecuted for events related to Lisa's death. Nussbaum was alone in the apartment with an unconscious and bleeding Lisa for over ten hours without seeking any medical attention for the girl. At Steinberg's twelve-week trial, his defense argued that Nussbaum's extensive injuries resulted from a consensual sadomasochistic relationship between the two defendants. This theory was supported by statements from some of Steinberg's and Nussbaum's neighbors. Her attorneys claimed Nussbaum's decision to stay with Steinberg, even though she was a victim of domestic violence, was a sign of battered woman syndrome.

During the trial Lisa's school teachers testified she was outgoing and friendly, but often arrived late to school. They reported seeing her with a black eye, and bruises across her legs. Sometimes she wore what seemed to be unwashed clothing, and once seemed to have had a clump of her hair chopped off.

In New York State at that time, first-degree murder applied only to those who killed police officers or had committed murder while already serving a sentence for a previous murder. The jury was unable to convict Steinberg on the more serious charge of second-degree murder, but it did convict him of the lesser charge of first-degree manslaughter. Judge Harold Rothwax subsequently sentenced Steinberg to the maximum penalty then available for that charge: 8 1/3 to 25 years in state prison.

On five occasions, Steinberg was denied discretionary parole, mainly because he never expressed remorse for the killing. However, on June 30, 2004, he was paroled under the state's "good time" law, which mandated the release of inmates who exhibited good behavior while incarcerated after having served two-thirds or more of the maximum possible sentence. New York State has since increased this ratio to six-sevenths of the maximum term for persons convicted of violent felonies. Steinberg had spent most of his imprisonment at New York State's supermax prison, the Southport Correctional Facility, presumably to prevent him from being attacked by other inmates.

After his release, Steinberg moved to Harlem, where he took up work in the construction industry. As of 2006, he maintained his innocence. In 2017, the New York Post interviewed Steinberg, who continued to deny allegations that he murdered Lisa. Instead he claimed it was the removal of Lisa's life support that was to blame for her death.

== Civil lawsuit ==
In 1988, Lisa's birth mother, Michele Launders, filed a civil lawsuit against Steinberg and New York City. Her lawyers claimed that the agencies involved in her care had not acted when there were signs of abuse. They claimed Lisa had shown up to school with bruises, and no one acted. City representatives visited Steinberg's apartment after neighbours complained, but didn't remove the child.

On January 16, 2007, the New York Supreme Court, Appellate Division (New York's intermediate appellate court) upheld a $15 million award against Steinberg to Michele Launders, Lisa's birth mother. In its opinion, the court rejected the position that Steinberg, who acted as his own attorney, put forth:

[F]or Steinberg to dismiss the 8 to 10 hours preceding Lisa's death as “at most, eight hours of pain and suffering,” or as he alternatively states, a “quick loss of consciousness” (emphasis supplied), demonstrates that he is as devoid of any empathy or human emotion now as he was almost 20 years ago when he stood trial for Lisa's homicide. As any parent and, no doubt, most adults who have taken trips with young children can attest, the oft-heard question, “are we there yet?” is a clear illustration that, the more anticipated an event or destination so, seemingly slower the passage of time in a child's mind. For Lisa, lying on a bathroom floor, her body aching from bruises of "varying ages," her brain swelling from Joel Steinberg's "staggering blow," those 8 to 10 hours so cavalierly dismissed by Steinberg must have seemed like eternity, as she waited and wondered when someone would come to comfort her, and help make the pain go away.

== Adoption of Mitchell Steinberg ==
Mitchell Steinberg was placed in foster care following the arrest of Steinberg and Nussbaum, while authorities worked to figure out where to place the child. Mitchell's birth mother, Nicole Smigiel, appeared in Manhattan Family Court to attempt to regain custody of the 16-month-old boy, but Nussbaum's attorney opposed the request, insisting that the adoption had been legal.

As part of Mitchell's custody battle, Smigiel's social worker reports were shared, revealing why Mitchell had been put up for adoption. Smigiel had been 16 at the time she became pregnant with Mitchell, and remained in denial until she was eight months' pregnant. When she discovered her prom dress wouldn't fit, she sought help from social services with the support of her mother. Social services noted that Smigiel had experienced morning sickness, and vomited blood, but believed she had a life-threatening illness. She went to a doctor for a physical examination, but the possibility of pregnancy wasn't discussed. When her pregnancy was confirmed by a doctor, Smigiel immediately began discussing how to arrange an adoption for the child.

Dr. Peter Sarosi delivered Mitchell at Beth Israel Hospital in Manhattan through induced labor when Smigiel was eight months and one week pregnant. Sarosi contacted Nussbaum, who he'd treated for infertility in the past, to see if she would be interested in adopting the child with Steinberg. Steinberg was interested, and recommended that David Verplank handle the legal arrangements. The child was handed over to Dr. Sarosi's wife, who turned the child over to Steinberg. Sarosi claimed he received no money from the adoption.

In November 1987, Smigiel won temporary custody of Mitchell when the Appellate Division of the State Supreme Court ruled that Steinberg and Nussbaum had no right to block the custody transfer. The judge mentioned the appalling conditions in which the child was found on November 2 as one of the reasons for their ruling. Smigiel dropped out of Loyola University in Baltimore and moved in with her parents to care for Mitchell, who she renamed Travis Christian.

Hedda Nussbaum's parents were devastated by the ruling, having prepared to spend Christmas with the boy. Steinberg's parents strongly defended their son, insisting that Lisa and Mitchell were raised in a happy home. They claimed they saw the children often, with Steinberg bringing them to his parents' house in Yonkers. Nussbaum gave up her attempts to gain custody of Mitchell after seeing footage of Smigiel being reunited with him.

== Impact ==
New York State's child abuse phone line was overwhelmed with calls following the news of Lisa's death. The department of Social Services, which operated the phone line, said that on a single Sunday they had received 588 calls, 83% more than they usually received.

Vancouver radio station CKLG memorialised Lisa by playing "Dear Mr. Jesus" by PowerSource in 1987. The song was formatted as a letter to Jesus about child abuse and had been released two years prior. The song exploded in popularity, with CKLG getting 200 requests for the song in a single day. Powersource sold over 8,000 records following the radio attention, and claimed they would donate the profits to aid the prevention of child abuse.

== See also ==
- Child abuse
- Domestic abuse
- Death of Nathaniel Craver
- Death of Hana Grace-Rose Williams
- Murder of Lydia Schatz
- Murder of Victoria Climbié
- Murder of Dennis Jurgens
