= Murder of Jeffrey Baldwin =

Death of Canadian abused child

Jeffrey Baldwin
- Born: January 20, 1997; Toronto, Ontario, Canada
- Died: November 30, 2002 (aged 5); Toronto, Ontario, Canada

Jeffrey Baldwin (January 20, 1997 – November 30, 2002) was a Canadian child whose death from septic shock and bacterial pneumonia after years of mistreatment by his grandparents, Elva Bottineau and Norman Kidman, led to significant changes in policy by children's aid societies in the granting of custody of children to relatives.

== Life ==
Jeffrey was born on January 20, 1997 in Toronto, Ontario, the son of Yvonne Kidman and Richard Baldwin. On April 28, 1998, he and his older sister were taken by the Catholic Children's Aid Society, after allegations of abuse were levelled against their parents. They were given into the custody of their maternal grandparents, Elva Bottineau and Norman Kidman. However, a background check had not been done on the grandparents, and it was later discovered that Elva Bottineau had been previously convicted of child abuse in 1970, after her five-month-old daughter Eva died of pneumonia, and was found to have had numerous fractures.

In 2000, a worker with the Catholic Children's Aid Society noticed a bruise under Jeffrey's eye. However, this was dismissed as an accident, and no further action was taken.

According to later court testimony, Jeffrey and one of his sisters were labelled "pigs" and fed only scraps, which they had to eat with their hands from a bowl while sitting on a mat while the other children ate at a table. Their room was unheated and kept locked for lengthy periods, so that they had to urinate and defecate there. The sister attended school, where teachers noted that she ate snacks ravenously and smelled of urine. Jeffrey, who was kept from school, was visibly emaciated. James Mills, the boyfriend of Jeffrey's aunt who also lived in the house, declared that Jeffrey's grandmother did not love him or his sister, and that they were purely a "dollars and cents" matter, as Kidman and Bottineau received social assistance for their care.

On the evening of November 30, 2002, the grandparents called 911 to report that Jeffrey was no longer breathing. Upon arrival, emergency workers noticed that his body was "covered in sores, bruises, and abrasions." He had practically no body fat or muscle tone at death, due to possibly years of starvation. His weight at death was 21 pounds (9.5 kg), which was slightly less than his weight on his first birthday, almost five years earlier. The immediate cause of death was determined to be septic shock, caused by malnutrition and by bacterial pneumonia that resulted from sleeping in contact with fecal matter.

== Court case ==
On March 19, 2003, the grandparents (Elva Bottineau and Norman Kidman) were arrested and charged with second-degree murder for their role in his death. The court declared they had kept Jeffrey and his sister locked in a bedroom, where he lived in his own feces, and left him to drink from a toilet. The judge was told that the pair used the children as a source of income, collecting government support checks while offering little in return. On April 7, 2006, they were convicted of second-degree murder by Justice David Watt in the Ontario Superior Court of Justice. Sentencing was delivered on June 9, 2006. Bottineau was sentenced to 22 years imprisonment (until 2028) and Kidman 20 years (until 2026), before they respectively become eligible for parole.

== Legacy ==
Changes to both child placement practices and reporting requirements were proposed as a result of the investigation and criminal case, including in a 2006 documentary on The Fifth Estate, "Failing Jeffrey Baldwin".

On November 22, 2013, Todd Boyce, a fellow Canadian unrelated to Jeffrey Baldwin, started a $25,000 crowdfunding campaign on Indiegogo over two months to erect a bronze statue in Greenwood Park, Toronto, depicting Jeffrey dressed as Superman, a superhero he loved. $36,015 was raised. In July 2014, DC Comics denied permission to use the "S" in the Superman logo on the statue. However, the decision was later reversed, and the use of the logo was allowed. The statue was unveiled in the park on October 18, 2014.

== See also ==
- Child abuse
- Murder of Sylvia Likens
- Murder of Nubia Barahona
- Nathaniel Craver
- Murder of Victoria Climbié
- Murder of Lydia Schatz
- Nannie Doss - who murdered her two grandsons
- Murder of Harmony Montgomery
- List of long-term false imprisonment cases
