= Shelter from the Storm (disambiguation) =

"Shelter from the Storm" is a song by Bob Dylan, released on his album Blood on the Tracks in 1975.

Shelter from the Storm may also refer to:

- Shelter from the Storm: A Concert for the Gulf Coast, 2005 television concert
- Shelter from the Storm, a 1997 novel by Maris Soule
- "Shelter from the Storm", an episode from the 18th season of Arthur
- Shelter from the Storm, a 1986 album by PowerSource
- Shelter from the Storm, a screenplay by Adam Mazer
- "Shelter from the Storm", an episode from the third season of Supergirl
