= Mary Nerney =

American activist and nun

Sister Mary Nerney was an American advocate on behalf of women in prison. Her work served as the inspiration for Sister Margaret and the Saturday Night Ladies, a CBS film starring Bonnie Franklin as Sister Margaret, a fictional version of Nerney.

== Biography ==
Mary Nerney was born on June 8, 1938, to Irish immigrants in Manhattan. She grew up in Washington Heights, attending St. Jean Baptiste High School before joining the Sisters of the Congregation de Notre Dame in 1956, and taking vows two years later. Nerney earned higher education degrees from the Catholic Teachers College and St. John's University and initially found work in Catholic schools, where she filled roles including as a teacher, psychologist and principal.

Nerney founded Project Green Hope: Services for Women, a charity working in prisoner reentry into society, in 1975. She also founded STEPS, a charity aimed at advocating for female victims of domestic violence in 1986. The charity offered legal aid and counseling and later expanded to aiding male victims and people who witnessed domestic violence. Project Green Hope was eventually renamed Services for Women. Nerney established a halfway house for prisoners to learn skills they could get jobs with. Nerney also created the Incarcerated Mothers Program aimed at placing the children of imprisoned people in care of relatives, rather than the foster system. She mentored female prisoners and advocated reducing the sentences of women who had committed crimes after being abused. Nerney also advocated the New York State government to change laws over the matter. Her counseling was provided to women including Hedda Nussbaum.

Her life served as the inspiration for Sister Margaret and the Saturday Night Ladies, a CBS film starring Bonnie Franklin as Sister Margaret, a fictional version of Nerney.

Nerney died of cancer in 2013.
