= Killing of Hana Grace-Rose Williams =

Child abuse case in Washington, United States

Hana Grace-Rose Williams (born Hana Alemu, June 19, 1997 – May 12, 2011) was a girl adopted from Ethiopia by an American couple living in Sedro-Woolley, Washington. She died in 2011 of hypothermia, according to an autopsy, and her adoptive parents Carri and Larry Williams were convicted in September 2013. The adoptive father was convicted of manslaughter in her death. Carri Williams was convicted of manslaughter, as well as "homicide by abuse" for Williams' abuse and death and was convicted of "first-degree assault of a child" for abusing a second adopted Ethiopian child who survived and testified at her trial.

== Background ==
Hana Grace-Rose Williams was adopted by Carri and Larry Williams in 2008 through Adoption Advocates International (AAI), an adoption agency based in Port Angeles, Washington. Before her adoption, she lived in Kidane Mehret Children's Home, a Catholic orphanage in Addis Ababa affiliated with AAI.

After being adopted, Hana was regularly spanked, locked in a closet, and denied food as punishment. She was not allowed to wear clothes, only a towel. She was also forced to sleep in a barn and take showers with a garden hose. Hana's post-adoption weight loss directly contributed to her death.

According to a memorial statement posted by her adoptive parents on the Lemley Chapel website, Williams "enjoyed knitting and crocheting, reading, drawing and various crafts, playing soccer and riding her bicycle." It is possible that she was homeschooled by Carri.

In addition to being the adoptive parents of Williams and an Ethiopian boy, Carri and Larry have seven biological children. The children reported the abuse to CPS two weeks after Hana’s death, when CPS returned to the home to investigate. At Carri and Larry's trial in 2013, their other adopted child and some of their biological children testified to the abuse. Carri Williams, convicted of homicide by abuse and first-degree assault of a child, was sentenced to 36 years and 11 months in prison. Larry Williams, convicted of first-degree manslaughter and first-degree assault of a child, was sentenced to 27 years and nine months in prison.

== Controversy regarding To Train Up a Child ==
Williams's adoptive parents had a copy of the controversial parenting book To Train Up a Child by Michael and Debi Pearl, which recommends that parents use corporal punishment, of a kind that many child protection authorities regard as child abuse, to discipline their children. They had also given a copy of the book to an acquaintance, according to investigators.

On his website, Michael Pearl responded to the deaths of Hana Williams, Sean Paddock, and Lydia Schatz by noting that "we share in the sadness over the tragic death of Hana Williams", but also that "I laugh at my caustic critics, for our properly-spanked and trained children grow to maturity in great peace and love" who become "entrepreneurs that pay the taxes your children will receive in entitlements."

Pearl spoke to the media about the controversy, stating that because the plastic tubing he recommends in the book is of a certain size, he is not responsible when parents who follow his lead use tubing that he believes is too big and end up murdering their children. Pearl also stated, "What her parents did is diametrically opposed to the philosophy of No Greater Joy Ministries and what is taught in the book." The New York Times claimed that the Williamses took the book's advice, particularly the Pearls' recommendation that parents starve their children by claiming that "a little fasting is good training", to extremes. A witness in the trial reported that the Williamses followed the book's recommendations "to use a switch, cold baths, withhold food and force children outside in cold weather as punishment," all of which were used on Williams.

== Appeals ==
In December 2015 both Carri Williams and Larry Williams submitted appeals, however their convictions were upheld. Carri submitted a subsequent appeal in 2019, and it was also denied.

== See also ==
- Adoption in the United States
- Corporal punishment
- Corporal punishment in the home
- Death of Nathaniel Craver
- Murder of Victoria Climbié
- Murder of Lydia Schatz
- Joel Steinberg
- Michael Pearl
