= Dima Yakovlev Law =

Law defining citizens banned from Russia

- Standard of the president of Russia
- Long title: On Sanctions for Individuals Violating Fundamental Human Rights and Freedoms of the Citizens of the Russian Federation
- Citation: 272-ФЗ
- Territorial extent: Russian Federation
- Signed by: President Vladimir Putin
- Signed: 28 December 2012
- Effective: 1 January 2013

Legislative history
- Introduced: 29 December 2012
- First reading: 21 December 2012 (State Duma)
- Second reading: 27 December 2012 (Federation Council)
- Status: In force

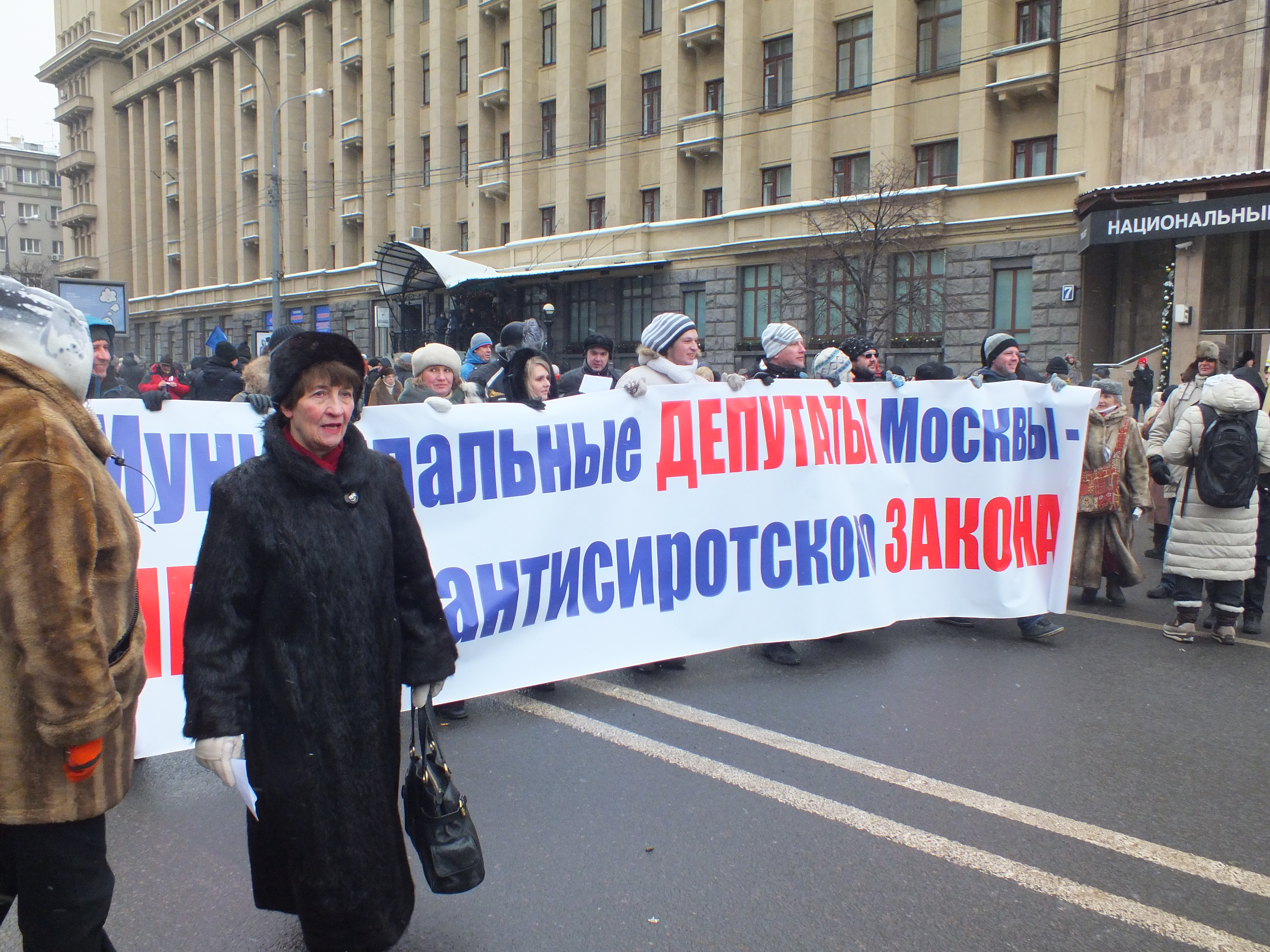
March against Dima Yakovlev Law

Federal Law of 28 December 2012 No. 272-FZ "On Sanctions for Individuals Violating Fundamental Human Rights and Freedoms of the Citizens of the Russian Federation", popularly known as the Dima Yakovlev Law (Russian: Закон Димы Яковлева), (Note: Also known by other informal names: Dima Yakovlev Bill, Dima Yakovlev Act, anti-Magnitsky law, or pejoratively, Law of Scoundrels.) is a law in Russia that defines sanctions against U.S. citizens involved in "violations of the human rights and freedoms of Russian citizens". It creates a list of citizens who are banned from entering Russia, and also allows the government to freeze their assets and investments. The law suspends the activity of politically active non-profit organisations which receive money from American citizens or organisations. It also bans citizens of the United States from adopting children from Russia.

The law was signed by Russian President Vladimir Putin on 28 December 2012 and took effect on 1 January 2013. The law is informally named after a Russian orphan adopted by a family from Purcellville, Virginia, who died of heat stroke after being left in a parked car for nine hours. The law is described as a response to the Magnitsky Act in the United States, which places sanctions on Russian officials who were involved in a tax scandal exposed by Russian lawyer Sergei Magnitsky; Magnitsky was alleged to have been handcuffed and tortured while in jail, supported by the official post-mortem expert opinion of the Russian Forensic Medical Examination Center of the Russian Ministry of Health.

== Voting for the law in Russian Parliament ==
The bill was proposed by United Russia deputy Ekaterina Lakhova. The bill passed the State Duma on 21 December 2012 and the Federation Council on 27 December 2012.

In the Duma, the bill's first reading saw one vote against (Ilya Ponomarev). The second reading received four votes against (Ilya Ponomarev, Dmitry Gudkov, Valery Zubov, Sergei Petrov - all from the A Just Russia faction), while the third and final reading was opposed by eight members (the previous four plus Andrei Ozerov from A Just Russia, Oleg Smolin and Zhores Alferov from the Communist Party of Russia, Boris Reznik from United Russia).

A United States Department of State press release states they "deeply regret Russia's passage of a law ending inter-country adoptions between the United States and Russia". United States Ambassador to Russia Michael McFaul said the law will "link the fate of orphaned children to unrelated political issues."

== Namesake ==
In the State Duma, the law was informally named after Dmitry "Dima" Yakovlev, a Russian toddler who was adopted by Miles Harrison of Virginia. The child was renamed Chase Harrison while in the United States. In July 2008, less than three months after he arrived in the United States, Dima died while he was strapped into his adoptive father's car. He had been left alone for nine hours in the car after his father forgot to take him to daycare service.

Following trial, Harrison was acquitted of involuntary manslaughter by a Circuit Court judge in Fairfax County, Virginia, in January 2009. The case became national news in Russia, highlighting abuse cases involving Russian children adopted by American parents. Following the child's death, Russian federal prosecutors opened an investigation into the circumstances of the incident, while Russian authorities called for restriction or ending of the adoption of Russian children by Americans.

On 28 December 2012, Governor of Pskov Oblast Andrey Turchak suspended two officials pending an investigation into their roles in the adoption of Dima Yakovlev.

== Reactions ==
Russian human rights ombudsman Vladimir Lukin said that the law will be contested in Russian constitutional courts.

=== Support ===
The Russian Orthodox Church supports the law. Church spokesman Vsevolod Chaplin says orphans adopted by American citizens "won't get a truly Christian upbringing and that means falling away from the Church and from the path to eternal life, in God's kingdom". According to the independent Moscow Times, the ban is popular among Russians.

=== Criticism ===
==== Western ====
The U.S. media outlets The Christian Science Monitor, Fox News, The Daily Beast, Time, and a local Houston, Texas, media affiliate criticised the move. The British newspaper The Guardian says it is "not about children's rights" and "ruins lives and leaves both countries looking sordid". After the law was signed on 28 December, the day many Christians mark as the Massacre of the Innocents, the law is referred to by The Economist as "Herod's law" and "cannibalistic".

Amnesty International called the law "in no one's best interest" and called for Russian parliamentarians to reject the law. Human Rights Watch Europe and Central Asia director Hugh Williamson says the law "could deprive them (Russian orphans) of the loving families they desperately need".

==== Russian ====
On 14 January 2013, about 20,000 people marched against the law in Moscow. Russian Chief Rabbi Berel Lazar says "Russian orphans should not become hostages of politics."

== Aftermath ==
From 1991 to 2010, over 50,000 Russian orphans were adopted in the United States; however, according to Time magazine, U.S. adoptions of Russian children fell by two-thirds from 2004 to 2009. At the time of the 2012 ban, over one thousand prospective adoptions were in progress. Among these prospective adoptions were about 200 Russian orphans told they were to be adopted. In January 2017, the European Court of Human Rights levied a fine on Russia, ruling that the ban constituted unlawful discrimination against prospective parents based on their nationality.

== See also ==
- List of deceased minors adopted from Russia in the United States
- Nathaniel Craver
