= Bank of Guyana =

Monetary authority of Guyana

Coordinates: 6.813438°N 58.165361°W

- Central bank of: Guyana
- Established: 1965
- Ownership: 100% state ownership
- Governor: Gobind Ganga
- Currency: Guyanese dollar
- Reserves: 895 million USD (2023)
- Website: bankofguyana.org.gy

The Bank of Guyana (BoG) is the central bank of Guyana. It was established in 1965 in advance of the country's independence in 1966. Dr. Gobind Ganga has been the governor of BoG since December 2014.

== Bank logo ==
The Bank's logo is divided into four sections, representing the industries of rice (top left), timber (top right), shipbuilding (bottom left) and minerals (bottom right).

== History ==
The Bank of Guyana was established by virtue of the Bank of Guyana Ordinance No. 23 of 1965. Actual operation commenced on October 16. 1965 – seven months before the country gained political independence. The early establishment of the Bank was promoted by an agreement of the British Government (acting for the still colonial members of the British Caribbean Currency Board (BCCB) and the Trinidad & Tobago Government), for the dissolution of the BCCB by mid-1967 and the cessation of issuance of currency after 1965.

The Bank of Guyana Ordinance established the Central Bank as an ‘autonomous institution' with headquarters in the capital city of Georgetown.

Within the context of the economy policy of the Government, the Bank shall be guided in all its actions by the objectives of fostering monetary stability and promoting credit and exchange conditions conducive to the growth of the economy of Guyana.

Apart from specifying the administrative and management arrangements for the Bank, the Ordinance, inter alia, decreed the Bank to:

- have the sole right to issue and redeem notes and coins
- act as banker to the commercial banks
- act as fiscal agent and trustee of a banker to the Government
- administer payment agreements entered into by the Government

In September 2019, the Bank of Guyana blocked Republic Bank Financial Holdings' purchase of Scotiabank's operations in Guyana. In December 2019, the Bank of Guyana became the managing body of the country's first sovereign wealth fund. Five months later, the fund received its first royalty payment of US$4.9 million from offshore oil production. In October 2020, the Bank of Guyana chose to soften identification requirements by commercial banks for individual account holders to open and maintain accounts, admitting that the previous requirements were too strict.

=== Ordinance revisions ===
The Ordinance establishing the Bank was revised and became the Bank of Guyana Act. CAP:85:02. This Act was further revised in 1995, 1998 and latterly in 2004. The later revisions significantly enhanced the role and purpose of the Bank within the framework of Guyana's economic and financial system. Additionally, they imparted greater autonomy to the Bank in terms of its constitution, administration and operations.

=== Currency and coins ===
The Bank commenced issuing the new national currency notes on November 15, 1965, to replace the BCCB notes, the issuance of which was expected to cease by December 31, 1965. However, national coins were not issued until the mid-1967. To date, the Bank has maintained De La Rue and the Royal Mint as suppliers of the nation's currency.

In 2012, the Bank of Guyana started to issue $5,000 bills, the highest denomination of the history of the bank.

== Locations ==
At its establishment, the Bank was housed in temporary premises in three locations. The Governor operated from an office assigned to him in the Parliament Building.

Office space was rented from the Colonial Life Insurance Company, High Street, Georgetown, to house the Research Department while the BCCB's office in the General Post Office Building, Georgetown, executed currency operations on behalf of the Bank.

== Leadership ==
The Bank began under the leadership of its first Governor, Dr. Horst Bockelman, who was seconded from the Deutsche Bundesbank, Germany. He was also involved in setting up the Central Bank in neighbouring Trinidad and Tobago. The Governor was later supported by Mr. Kemal Sogancilar, who was appointed Banking Manager. He was seconded from the Central Bank of Cyprus but served earlier in the Turkish Central Bank.

All of the other positions were initially held by Guyanese. Two years later, William P. D’Andrade acceded to the top position to become the first Guyanese Governor of the Bank. He was an ex-officio member of the Board of Directors as a result of his post of Secretary to the Treasury, Ministry of Finance and later served briefly as Deputy Governor.

=== Governors ===
- Horst Bockelmann, 16 October 1965 - January 1968
- William Peter D'Andrade, January 1968 - 1973
- Patrick E. Matthews, 1973 - September 1991
- Archibald Meredith, September 1991 - June 1997
- Dolly Sursattie Singh, June 1997 - June 2005
- Lawrence Theodore Williams, June 2005 - May 2014
- Gobind Ganga, Since November 2014

== See also ==
- Economy of the Caribbean
- Economy of South America
- Central banks and currencies of the Caribbean
- Banknotes of Demerary and Essequibo
- List of central banks
