= List of deceased children adopted from Russia in the United States =

International adoption in Russia began to be practiced in 1991. On January 1, 2013, Federal Law No. 272 entered into force, which, in particular, prohibited the adoption of Russian children by citizens of the United States. During this time, between 45,000 and 60,000 children from Russia were adopted in the US; as of 2015, twenty cases of death as a result of violence or accident were known:

== List ==
Name	Adopted	Died	Accused and outcome
David Polreis, Jr. (Russian: Костя Шлепин)	August, 1996	February 9, 1996 (2 years old)	mother: 18 year
Logan Higginbotham (Russian: Анна Почётная)	May, 1995	November 25, 1998 (3 years old)	mother: 1 year
Viktor Alexander Matthey (Russian: Виктор Тулимов)	January, 2000	October 31, 2000 (7 years old)	mother: 10 year; father: 10 year
Luke Evans (Russian: Сергей Наконечный)	May, 2001	November 30, 2001(16 months old)	mother: acquitted
Jacob Lindorff	November, 2001	December 14, 2001 (5 years old)	mother: 6 year; father: 4 year
Zachary Higier (Russian: Никита Хорьяков)	December, 2001	August 15, 2002 (2 years old)	mother: 2.5 year
Anatoliy Kolenda	January 20, 1998	October 12, 2002 (11 years old)	(the father killed the children, his wife, and shot himself)
Yana Kolenda	January 20, 1998	October 12, 2002 (11 years old)	(the father killed the children, his wife, and shot himself)
Maria Anastasia Bennett (Russian: Анастасия Плотникова)	January, 2002	October 23, 2002 (2 years old)	mother: 3 year
Jessica Albina Hagmann	December, 2002	August 11, 2003 (2 years old)	mother: 5 years probation
Liam Thompson (Russian: Дмитрий Ишленкулов)	April 28, 2003	October 16, 2003 (3 years old)	mother: 14 year; father: 15 year
Alex Pavlis (Russian: Алексей Гейко)	November, 2003	December 18, 2003 (6 years old)	mother: 12 year
Dennis Gene Merryman (Russian: Денис Урицкий)	January, 2000	January 22, 2005 (8 years old)	mother: 22 year, father: 22 year
Nina Hilt (Russian: Вика Баженова)	January, 2004	July 20, 2005 (2.5 years old)	mother: 25 year
Isaac Jonathan Dykstra (Russian: Илья Каргынцев)	May 16, 2005	August 13, 2005	father: acquitted
Nicolai Emelyantsev	February 8, 2008	July 3, 2008 (1 years old)	mother: 1-15 year
Chase Harrison (Russian: Дима Яковлев)	February 12, 2008	July 8, 2008 (1,5 years old)	father: acquitted
Nathaniel Michael Craver (Russian: Иван Скоробогатов)	September, 2003	August 25, 2009 (7 years old)	father: 16 months, mother: 16 months
Jackson David Attuso (Russian: Кирилл Казаков)	October 16, 2003	June 10, 2010 (8 years old)	life imprisonment (murdered by a stranger)
Max Alan Shatto (Russian: Максим Кузьмин)	October 23, 2012	January 21, 2013 (3 years old)	no charges filed (accidental death)

== See also ==
- Child abuse
- Dima Yakovlev Law
