= Chase Harrison (adopted child) =

Adopted Russian child and namesake of the Dima Yakovlev Law

- Born: Dmitry Alekseyevich Yakovlev; 1 November 2006; Pskov Oblast, Russia
- Died: 8 July 2008 (aged 1); Purcellville, Virginia, U.S.
- Citizenship: United States
- Known for: Namesake of the Dima Yakovlev Law

Chase Harrison (born Dmitry Alekseyevich Yakovlev, Russian: Дмитрий Алексеевич Яковлев; November 1, 2006 – July 8, 2008), known in Russia as Dima Yakovlev (Russian: Дима Яковлев), was a Russian child adopted by an American family from Purcellville, Virginia, who died of heat stroke after being locked inside a parked car for nine hours. This event and its resulting legal proceedings, where the boy's adoptive father was acquitted of involuntary manslaughter, prompted Russia to create the Dima Yakovlev Law prohibiting U.S. citizens from adopting Russian children among other sanctions.

== Adoption ==
Dima Yakovlev was born in 2006 in the Pskov Oblast. His mother had previously been raised in an orphanage. Shortly after his birth, he was placed in the Pskov Regional Children's Home for children with organic lesions of the central nervous system and mental disorders, located in the town of Pechory. His mother gave written consent for possible adoption. Several unsuccessful attempts were made to place the child with a Russian family. Eventually, an American couple, Miles Harrison and Carol Lynn Eckmann-Harrison, expressed their intention to adopt him and made three trips to Russia for that purpose. Miles Harrison was the executive director of the consulting company Project Solutions Group in Herndon, Virginia. On February 21, 2008, the Pskov Regional Court granted permission for the Harrisons to adopt Dima. After the adoption, he received the surname of his adoptive parents, Harrison, and his given name, Chase.

At the end of 2012, Russian media reported that Dima's biological grandparents claimed they had attempted to obtain custody of the child during the adoption process but were refused.

On December 25, 2012, the Investigative Committee of the Russian Federation announced that it had initiated a preliminary inquiry into media reports alleging that the child’s relatives were prevented from obtaining custody of Dima.

According to media reports, procedural violations occurred during the adoption process. Handwriting experts confirmed that the grandmother’s signature on documents renouncing adoption had been forged.

== Death ==
Three months after the adoption, on July 8, 2008, at the age of 21 months, Dima died after being left by Miles Harrison for nine hours inside a locked GMC Yukon on a day when the temperature reached 32 °C (90 °F). Harrison had strapped the boy into the back seat at their home in Purcellville, Virginia, and left the vehicle parked near his office in Herndon (about 40 km from Purcellville), mistakenly believing that he had dropped his son off at a KinderCare daycare center in Ashburn along the way. Meteorologists noted that, at an ambient temperature of 32 °C, the temperature inside a closed car can reach 54 °C (129 °F). During the investigation, Miles Harrison stated that he had intended to take the child to daycare but, rushing to work, forgot to do so.

== Investigation ==
Under U.S. law, Harrison faced up to ten years in prison on charges of involuntary manslaughter, but on December 17, 2008, he was fully acquitted by an American court.

Media outlets later reported several similar cases in the United States in which parents who had left their children in car seats on the back seats of vehicles were acquitted, and in some cases no charges were filed at all. Between 1998 and 2014, 629 children in the United States died of heatstroke in closed vehicles. In fewer than half of these cases were legal proceedings initiated, and in less than a quarter did the court’s decision result in imprisonment (as of 2007).

In February 2009, Miles Harrison said in an interview with The Washington Post:

I pray for forgiveness from the Russian people. There are good people in this country who deserve children, and there are children in Russia who need parents. Please don't punish everyone for my mistake.

== Reaction in Russia ==
The American court’s decision in the case of Dima Yakovlev provoked a strong reaction in Russian media and government circles. On December 30, 2008, the Investigative Committee under the Prosecutor’s Office of Russia opened a criminal case to determine the circumstances of the child’s death and to verify the legality of his adoption. The Committee stated: "It has been established that one-and-a-half-year-old Dima Yakovlev died on July 8, 2008, when his adoptive father Miles Harrison left the boy locked in a car for nine hours in 50-degree heat. The child had been adopted in Russia three months before the tragedy".

At the end of 2012, the State Duma of Russia introduced draft law No. 186614-6 (often referred to as the response to the Magnitsky Act), one of the amendments to which prohibited U.S. citizens from adopting Russian children. The ruling party United Russia proposed naming the law in memory of Dima Yakovlev. Deputy Vyacheslav Nikonov suggested dedicating the law to the memory of all Russian children who had died in the United States after being adopted. On December 28, 2012, the law was signed by President Vladimir Putin and came into force on January 1, 2013.

Renowned pediatrician and surgeon, and president of the National Medical Chamber of Russia, Leonid Roshal, proposed the installation of a "people’s monument" to Dima Yakovlev in Moscow. According to Roshal, the child who died several years earlier "is saving our orphaned children".

== See also ==
- Child vehicular heat stroke deaths
- Dima Yakovlev Law
- List of deceased minors adopted from Russia in the United States
