= Hedda Nussbaum =

American woman (born 1942)

Hedda Nussbaum (born August 8, 1942) is an American woman who was a caregiver of a six-year-old girl who died of physical abuse in 1987. The death of the girl, Lisa Steinberg, sparked a controversial trial and media frenzy. The legal case was one of the first to be televised "gavel to gavel." Supporters characterized Nussbaum as a victim of horrific domestic abuse at the hands of her live-in partner, Joel Steinberg. Critics suggested she was a consensual partner in a sadomasochistic relationship and an unprosecuted co-conspirator in the young girl's death.

Ultimately Nussbaum was granted immunity for her testimony against Steinberg, who was convicted of manslaughter and served 16 years in prison.

== Biography ==
=== Early life and career ===
Before meeting Joel Steinberg in 1975, Hedda Nussbaum had been an editor and author of children's books at Random House publishers, and before that at Appleton Century Crofts. Steinberg was a defense attorney who sometimes handled adoption cases. Beginning in 1976, Nussbaum and Steinberg lived together in a brownstone apartment in New York City's Greenwich Village. Her 1977 book, Plants Do Amazing Things, was dedicated, in part, "to Joel, my everyday inspiration."

Due to Nussbaum's occasionally obvious bruises and other injuries, friends and colleagues suspected that Nussbaum was the victim of domestic violence. Some neighbors later stated to police they believed that Nussbaum and Steinberg were active participants in a "some kind of a sexual sadomasochistic game." Friends occasionally offered to help Nussbaum, but she declined their offers of intervention or aid and refused to implicate Steinberg. After extended absences from work, Random House put Nussbaum on consulting editor status in 1982.

In 1981, under dubious legal circumstances, Nussbaum and Steinberg took custody of an infant girl they named Lisa. The girl's birth mother had paid Steinberg a $500.00 legal fee to place the child with a Roman Catholic family; both Nussbaum and Steinberg were Jewish. Under similar circumstances, Nussbaum and Steinberg later took in a toddler they named Mitchell. The couple never legally adopted either child.

In her 2005 book Surviving Intimate Terrorism, Nussbaum argued that her denial of the danger she and her children lived in was typical of some chronically maltreated persons (see battered person syndrome). Nussbaum claimed that she fled from the home six times, only to later return. Nussbaum mentions the medical theory that trauma, especially prolonged trauma, can elicit the body's production of opioids that produce mental and physical numbness. Nussbaum also suggests that her "numbness" further reduced her ability to think and act clearly, akin to "Stockholm syndrome", a mental state wherein victims identify with their abusers.

=== Lisa's death and the subsequent trial ===
According to initial police reports, on November 1, 1987, around 7:00 p.m., Steinberg rendered Lisa unconscious with a severe blow to the head. Nussbaum remained alone with the dying child for roughly ten hours, failing to notify police or medical personnel. Steinberg departed and returned several times, sometimes freebasing crack cocaine. According to initial police reports, Nussbaum didn't notify authorities because she believed Steinberg had supernatural healing powers. At roughly 6.00 a.m. the next morning, Lisa stopped breathing. Shortly thereafter, Steinberg telephoned 9-1-1 at Nussbaum's urging.

After Lisa's death, Mitchell was discovered in squalid conditions. The child's birth mother, Nicole Smiegel, had waived her parental rights. However, since a legal adoption had never occurred, Smiegel was ultimately granted custody of her son.

When authorities learned of Lisa's death, they initially charged both Nussbaum and Steinberg with complicity. In the course of the investigation, however, charges were later dropped against Nussbaum. She agreed to testify against Steinberg, and medical examination revealed that Nussbaum was anemic, malnourished, and suffering from broken bones and chronic infections. With these findings, authorities determined that Nussbaum was physically incapable of seriously wounding Lisa.

Nussbaum's courtroom testimony against Steinberg earned substantial media attention, due in part to her face showing obvious evidence of physical trauma. There were also indications, as Nussbaum testified in court, that Lisa had been sexually abused by people outside of her immediate family. During the trial, medical experts testified that while Lisa's injuries were severe, she would have almost certainly survived if given prompt medical treatment.

Steinberg was convicted on charges of first-degree manslaughter. After serving sixteen years at the Southport Correctional Facility, where he was held in protective custody, Steinberg was released on parole in 2004 and got a job in construction.

=== Later life ===
In the years following Lisa's death, Nussbaum worked to rebuild her life and had numerous reconstructive plastic surgeries. She also co-facilitated a support group for battered women for about eight years and later worked as a paralegal for an organization that assists battered women. In 1995, Nussbaum began giving lectures about abuse at colleges and shelters. When Steinberg was released from prison, however, she receded from public attention until the publication of her book a year and a half later.

== Analyses ==
The Nussbaum case polarized feminist scholars and activists. Some saw Nussbaum as an archetypal victim of domestic violence whose actions were controlled and restricted not only by her abusive partner, but also by the culture at large that denies the seriousness of abuse in the home. Other leading feminists—notably Susan Brownmiller—suggested that while Nussbaum suffered violence from her partner, she should also have shared full culpability for Lisa's death. Brownmiller was inspired to write a fictionalized account of the events in a novel titled Waverly Place.

== Bibliography ==
Books by Nussbaum include:

- Plants Do Amazing Things (1976)
- Animals Build Amazing Homes (1979)
- Surviving Intimate Terrorism (September 12, 2005) - ISBN 1-4137-5652-2
