= Larry Williams Jr. =

American football player (born 1985)

Larry Williams
Profile
- Position: Defensive back

Personal information
- Born: January 12, 1985 (age 41); Highland Springs, Virginia, U.S.
- Listed height: 6 ft 1 in (1.85 m)
- Listed weight: 205 lb (93 kg)

Career information
- High school: Highland Springs (VA)
- College: West Virginia
- NFL draft: 2008: undrafted

Career history
- Green Bay Blizzard (2009); Milwaukee Iron (2010); Richmond Raiders (2011–2014); Lehigh Valley Steelhawks (2015)*
- * Offseason or practice squad member only

Career AFL statistics
- Tackles: 7
- Pass Breakups: 1
- Forced Fumbles: 0
- Fumble Recoveries: 0
- Interceptions: 0
- Stats at ArenaFan.com

Larry Williams Jr. (born January 12, 1985) is an American former football defensive back. He played college football for the University of West Virginia. He was signed as a free agent by the Green Bay Blizzard in 2009.

== Professional career ==
=== Green Bay Blizzard ===
After going undrafted in the 2008 NFL draft, Williams signed as an undrafted free agent with the Green Bay Blizzard of af2. Williams played in 12 games with the Blizzard where he played defensive back and return kicks.

=== Milwaukee Iron ===
In 2010, Williams signed with the Milwaukee Iron as they transitioned into Arena Football 1. The move re-united Williams with Bob Landsee, who coached the Blizzard in 2009.

=== Richmond Raiders ===
In 2011, Williams joined the Richmond Raiders, an expansion team in the Southern Indoor Football League (SIFL). On the very first play of the season, Williams returned the opening kickoff for a touchdown. Williams has played with the Raiders since 2011.

=== Lehigh Valley Steelhawks ===
Williams signed with the Lehigh Valley Steelhawks on October 9, 2014. He was waived on March 17, 2015.
