= To Train Up a Child =

1994 book by Michael and Debi Pearl

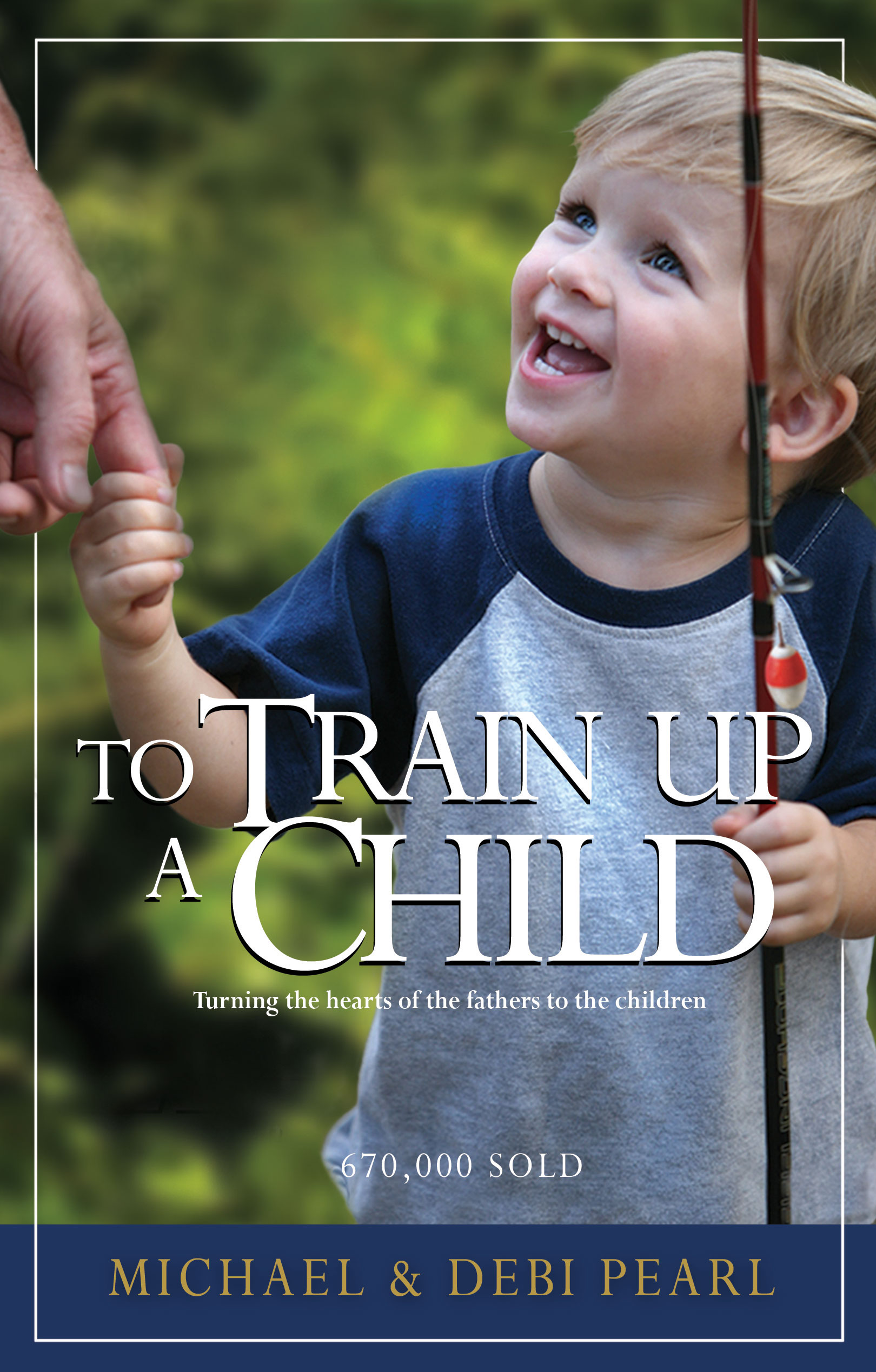
2015 edition cover (Note: The cover repeats a 2011 claim by Michael Pearl that the book had sold more than 670,000 copies. However, Nielsen BookScan recorded only 9,579 sales between 2001 and 2013. While it is possible the book sold best prior to the earliest sales records available, this figure is likely to be inflated by shifting books through mailing lists.)

To Train Up a Child is a 1994 parenting advice book written and self-published by independent Baptists Michael and Debi Pearl that has generated controversy for encouraging child abuse. The book has been endorsed by the Institute of Basic Life Principles. To Train Up a Child gained notoriety after methods recommended in the book were found to have contributed to several high-profile cases of child death.

== Background ==
Michael Pearl (born 1945) is an American independent Baptist preacher and author. After graduating from Mid-South Bible College, he worked with Union Mission in Memphis for 25 years. His 2006 graphic novel Good and Evil won the Independent Publishers' IPPY Award Bronze Medal in the Graphic Novel/Drama category in 2009 and was a 2009 ForeWord Book Award finalist. His other publications include No Greater Joy Magazine, Training Children to be Strong in Spirit, and Created to Be His Help Meet.

Michael married Debi Pearl (née unknown) in 1971. Together they wrote To Train Up a Child, which they self-published in 1994. The Pearls have five children. Their daughter Shoshanna Pearl Easling has said she had a wonderful childhood and that her parents never spoke to her in anger. Another daughter, Rebekah Pearl Anast, has said, "I think that the fact that all five of us are very happy, balanced people with great marriages and happy kids is evidence that my parents did the right thing."

The Pearls' teachings on physical discipline are said to have followed James Dobson and Focus on the Family's advocacy of corporal punishment. The Pearls were endorsed by the Institute in Basic Life Principles (IBLP). The Pearls and To Train Up a Child were briefly covered in the documentary series Shiny Happy People: Duggar Family Secrets, which details the Duggar family and their upbringing under and connections to the IBLP.

No Greater Joy Ministries is the Pearls' 501(c)(3) nonprofit organization. The organization brings in between $1.5 and $1.7 million a year through product sales and donations and has sold or donated over 1.5 million copies of Pearl's books, CDs, DVDs, and other materials. The Pearls say they receive no royalties from the sales and that the profits are used for ministry purposes.

== Controversy ==
To Train Up a Child has been criticized for advocating child abuse. The book tells parents to use objects like a 0.25 in (6.4 mm) diameter plastic tube to spank children and "break their will". It recommends other abusive tactics like withholding food and putting children under a cold garden hose. The distribution of the book was condemned in the United Kingdom, where causing bodily harm to children is illegal; the Pearls called this a matter of religious freedom, saying "Christians are not able to openly obey God" under such laws. Its teachings are linked to the deaths of Sean Paddock, Lydia Schatz, and Hana Grace-Rose Williams. In all three cases, homeschooling parents acted on the Pearls' teachings. Michael Ramsey, the district attorney who prosecuted the Schatz case, called To Train Up a Child "an extraordinarily dangerous book for those who take it literally" and "truly an evil book". Frances Chalmers, the pediatrician who examined Hana Williams's corpse, said, "this book, while perhaps well intended, could easily be misinterpreted and could lead to what I consider significant abuse."

On his website, Pearl published responses to the deaths of Williams and Schatz, listing quotes from the book that warn against abuse. He reacted to Schatz's murder by arguing that his link to it was unobjectionable because Pearl's children became "entrepreneurs that pay the taxes your children will receive in entitlements." Pearl said he bore no responsibility for the murders because the size of the plastic tubing he recommends in his book is "too light to cause damage to the muscle or the bone." He called Williams's murder "diametrically opposed to the philosophy of No Greater Joy Ministries and what is taught in the book." Pearl wrote, "The book repeatedly warns parents against abuse and emphasizes the parents' responsibility to love and properly care for their children", which includes training them for success." The New York Times reported that the Williamses' discipline tactics involved Pearl's book taken to extremes, such as the Pearls' advice that "a little fasting is good training." A witness in the trial reported that Hana Williams was subjected to "the use of a switch, cold baths, withhold food and force children outside in cold weather as punishment".
