= Southport Correctional Facility =

Supermax state prison in New York, US

Coordinates: 42°03′02″N 76°47′47″W

- Interactive map of Southport Correctional Facility
- Location: 236 Bob Masia Drive Pine City, New York
- Status: closed
- Security class: Supermax
- Capacity: 441
- Opened: 1988
- Closed: 2022
- Managed by: New York State Department of Corrections and Community Supervision

The Southport Correctional Facility was an ultra-maximum-security, or "supermax", prison, run by the New York State Department of Corrections and Community Supervision. It was located in the town of Southport, in the Southern Tier of New York State, United States.

It was rare for a prisoner to be sent directly to Southport from the outside; virtually all of its inmates were transferred there after committing serious disciplinary infractions at some other prison in the state. On occasion, however, a particularly notorious inmate would be sent there for "protective custody"; that is to say, to prevent him from being attacked by other inmates. One example was convicted child-killer Joel Steinberg.

The prison closed on March 10, 2022.

== History ==
The prison opened on October 11, 1988.

== Incidents ==
Southport became the scene of a riot on June 26, 1990, when fighting broke out among a group of approximately 250 inmates, eight of whom were injured in the melee, along with 19 members of the prison's staff.

Another incident, this one involving the taking of four employees as hostages, followed on May 28, 1991. Prisoners and correctional officers injured that day received care at nearby Arnot-Ogden Memorial Hospital and St. Joseph's Hospital in Elmira, NY.

== Interview with inmate ==
Club promoter and convicted killer Michael Alig was transferred to Southport in 2000 and in an interview with New York magazine said:

What Southport is famous for is the shit and the piss throwing. Because the inmates have no access to each other, what they do is fill cups up with shit and piss and throw it at each other. You get caught doing it once, they keep your hands handcuffed behind your back so you can't throw anything. So if you really still want to get your neighbor with shit, guess what you do? You put it in your mouth and when you get to the yard, you spit it on someone.
