= Lawrence Williams (banker) =

Lawrence Theodore Williams CCH, (c. 1955 – May 7, 2014) was a Guyanese banking official. He served as the governor of the Bank of Guyana from June 8, 2005 until his death on May 7, 2014. Williams succeeded outgoing Governor Dolly Singh, who retired from the post.

In 2011, Williams was awarded the Cacique's Crown of Honour, Guyana's third highest honor.

Williams died from cancer at Dr. Balwant Singh Hospital in Georgetown, Guyana, on May 7, 2014, at the age of 59.
