= PowerSource (musical group) =

American contemporary Christian music group

- Origin: Bedford, Texas, United States
- Genres: Contemporary Christian music
- Past members: Sharon Batts

PowerSource was an American contemporary Christian music group from Bedford, Texas, United States. The group was associated with a music ministry known as Gospel Workshop for Children, and is best known for the song "Dear Mr. Jesus" (written by Richard Klender), which crossed over to pop radio and reached the Billboard Hot 100 in December 1987.

The lyrics of "Dear Mr. Jesus" deal with child abuse and are sung from the perspective of a girl writing a letter to Jesus, expressing her concerns after seeing a news report about a "little girl beaten black and blue" by her parents. At the end of the song, the narrator concludes her letter saying: "Please don't tell my daddy, but my mommy hits me too."

Recorded in 1985, "Dear Mr. Jesus" featured group member Sharon Batts, then six years old, on lead vocals. The song appeared on PowerSource's 1986 album Shelter from the Storm, but did not break through to pop radio until 1987, when it was played on Tampa radio station WRBQ-FM. Other stations, including New York's WHTZ, began to play the song as well, some reporting hundreds or thousands of requests per day for it. The song's popularity was timely, as it came shortly after the story of Elizabeth "Lisa" Steinberg, a six-year-old New York girl beaten to death by her adoptive father Joel Steinberg in November 1987, became national news.

"Dear Mr. Jesus" (credited to "Powersource (Solo...Sharon)") peaked at No. 61 on the Hot 100 in January 1988, spending seven weeks on the chart. The album Shelter from the Storm reached #10 on Billboard's Top Contemporary Christian Albums chart.
