= Larry Williams (American football) =

American football player and administrator (1963–2025)

- Williams in 1992

No. 70, 66, 75
- Positions: Guard, center

Personal information
- Born: July 3, 1963; Orange, California, U.S.
- Died: October 16, 2025 (aged 62); San Francisco, California, U.S.
- Listed height: 6 ft 5 in (1.96 m)
- Listed weight: 292 lb (132 kg)

Career information
- High school: Mater Dei (Santa Ana, California)
- College: Notre Dame
- NFL draft: 1985: 10th round, 259th overall pick

Career history

Playing
- Cleveland Browns (1985–1988); San Diego Chargers (1989–1990); Kansas City Chiefs (1991)*; New Orleans Saints (1991); New England Patriots (1992)
- * Offseason or practice squad member only

Operations
- Portland Pilots (2004–2011) (AD); Marquette Golden Eagles (2012–2013) (AD); Akron Zips (2015–2021) (AD); San Francisco Dons (2022–2025) (AD)

Awards and highlights
- 2× Second-team All-American (1983, 1984)

Career NFL statistics
- Games played: 61
- Games started: 44
- Fumble recoveries: 2
- Stats at Pro Football Reference

Lawrence Richard Williams II (July 3, 1963 – October 16, 2025) was an American professional football player and college administrator. He played five seasons as an offensive guard in the National Football League (NFL). After his football career, he became an athletic director.

== Early life ==
Williams was born on July 3, 1963, in Orange, California, and attended Mater Dei High School in Santa Ana.

== College career ==
Williams was an offensive lineman for the Notre Dame Fighting Irish. He twice earned second-team All-American honors during his college career: as a junior he was selected by Football News, and as a senior by United Press International (UPI). He graduated from Notre Dame with a Bachelor of Arts degree in 1985.

== Professional career ==
Williams was selected by the Cleveland Browns in the tenth round with the 259th pick in the 1985 NFL draft. He played in 42 games, starting 33, for the Browns from 1986 to 1988. He became a free agent in February 1989 when he was left unprotected by the Browns because of a shoulder surgery in January 1989. Williams signed with the San Diego Chargers on March 7, 1989. He was placed on the physically unable to perform list on August 29, 1989. He was released by the Chargers on September 3, 1990. Williams played in six games, starting two, for the New Orleans Saints during the 1991 season. He played in thirteen games, starting nine, for the New England Patriots in 1992. He retired in 1993 while still a member of the Patriots.

== Post-NFL ==
Williams studied law at Cleveland State from 1986 to 1989. He earned a J.D. degree from the University of San Diego School of Law in 1992. He practiced law for six years for Baker & Daniels, an Indianapolis-based firm, after his football career. He then returned to Notre Dame to work on licensing and product marketing for the athletic department from 1999 to 2003.

== Administrative career ==
Williams became athletic director of the Portland Pilots of the University of Portland in June 2004 and served in that capacity through December 2011. At Portland, Williams increased resources and scholarship support while he was director, and saw the women's soccer team win two national championships in 2002 and 2005. He also hired Eric Reveno, a longstanding head coach of the men's basketball team.

He was named the Marquette Golden Eagles' new athletic director on December 5, 2011, and started his tenure on January 2, 2012. Williams came into a program marred with student-athlete sexual assault allegations that led to his predecessor's resignation. During his time with the Golden Eagles, he guided their athletic program through conference realignment in the Big East. He left Marquette in December 2013 to pursue other interests.

From 2015 to 2021, Williams was the athletic director at University of Akron. He reestablished the men's basketball team at Akron after a 5-year hiatus; since then, the program has made it to the NCAA tournament three times under head coach John Groce. He was named the sixth best athletic director in the country by AthleticDirectorU during his time at Akron. He left the program in 2021 after choosing not to renew his contract with the university.

In 2022, Williams became the athletic director at the University of San Francisco (USF). During his tenure with USF, Williams dealt with a series of lawsuits alleging misconduct among the school's baseball and soccer programs.

== Personal life and death ==
Williams's wife Laura Lee was a former collegiate All-American and national champion tennis player at Notre Dame. They had five children. Their daughter Kristin was a rower at Santa Clara University while their sons Sean, Scott and Eric played football at Yale University.

Williams was a devout Catholic. Every school that Williams worked at was associated in some way with the Catholic church, except for the University of Akron.

Williams suffered a "heart-related incident" on the morning of October 16, 2025, while working out on the USF campus. He died that morning at the age of 62.
