= Laurie Williams =

Laurie Williams may refer to:

- Laurie Williams (cricketer) (1968–2002), West Indian male cricketer
- Laurie Williams (footballer) (born 1948), Scottish footballer
- Laurie Williams (software engineer)
- Laurie Williams (wheelchair basketball) (born 1992), British female wheelchair basketball player
