= Murder of Lydia Schatz =

2010 child murder in Paradise, California, US

- Location: Paradise, California
- Date: February 5, 2010
- Attack type: Murder by whipping
- Perpetrators: Kevin Schatz; Elizabeth Schatz
- Convictions: Second-degree murder Torture; Voluntary manslaughter Infliction of unlawful corporal punishment

Lydia Charity Schatz (March 15, 2002 – February 6, 2010) was an American child of Liberian origin who was killed in 2010 by her adoptive parents.

Schatz lived with her parents in Paradise, California, and was being homeschooled. She reportedly mispronounced the word "pulled", so her parents decided to punish her by whipping her for nine hours. She died in a hospital due to massive tissue damage. The parents were reportedly following the child discipline rules of a fundamentalist Christian organization.

== Background ==
Kevin and Elizabeth Schatz lived in Paradise, California, where they were raising and homeschooling their six biological and three adopted children. In 2007, they adopted Lydia and two other children from Liberia. Later that year, Kevin was interviewed in the family home by KNVN TV about his love of children and the adoption process.

== Murder ==
On February 5, 2010, Lydia Schatz received forceful and numerous whippings with a quarter-inch plastic tubing. She was held down for nine hours by Elizabeth and beaten dozens of times by Kevin on the back of her body, causing massive tissue damage, according to Butte County District Attorney Mike Ramsey. She was apparently being disciplined for mispronouncing a word. She died in the hospital on February 6. Her sister Zariah, 11 years old, was also beaten for "being a liar and a bad influence on the 7-year-old." Zariah was hospitalized in critical condition with severe injuries, but survived.

== Trial ==
The Schatzes told police they were following the teachings about child discipline of a fundamentalist Christian organization headed by Michael and Debi Pearl. Investigators say the Schatzes practiced a similar form of corporal punishment on their six biological children and were training their oldest daughter in the proper way to deliver spankings. Pearl's website suggests "A swift whack with the plastic tubing would sting but not bruise. Give ten licks at a time, more if the child resists."

Kevin Schatz was found guilty of second degree murder and torture and sentenced to two concurrent life sentences, with 22 years minimum. Elizabeth Schatz was found guilty of voluntary manslaughter and infliction of unlawful corporal punishment and was sentenced to 13 years.

== See also ==
- Adoption in the United States
- Child discipline
- Corporal punishment
- Corporal punishment in the home
- Domestic violence
- List of murdered American children
