= Nathaniel Craver =

Tragic infant death

Nathaniel Craver (Russian: Иван Скоробогатов; tr. Ivan Skorobogatov; February 4, 2002 – August 25, 2009) was a Russian-born boy adopted by a married U.S. couple whose death in their custody sparked a public outcry.

== Biography ==
Ivan was born on February 4, 2002, in Troitsk, Chelyabinsk region, and along with his twin sister was abandoned by his biological parents. At the orphanage, the twins were named Ivan and Dasha Skorobogatov, but the biological parents of the children have not been established. Nathaniel reportedly had fetal alcohol syndrome and reactive attachment disorder. According to his adoptive parents, these conditions led Nathaniel to self-injure. Two years prior to Nathaniel's death, he and his twin sister were removed from the Cravers' custody while they were investigated by child and youth workers. Documents released by the authorities indicate that the Cravers began homeschooling the children and no further visits from child and youth workers were conducted.

== Hospitalization and death ==
On the morning of August 20, 2009, Michael Craver arrived at Geisinger Holy Spirit in Harrisburg, Pennsylvania with an unresponsive Nathaniel, claiming that he discovered the boy in that state in his bed. The Cravers claimed that Nathaniel had intentionally thrown himself into a wood burning stove the night before and that he had been fine when he was put to bed. An emergency room nurse who treated Nathaniel commented that the boy's head felt "like a wet sponge" and that he was covered in bruises at different stages of healing. The boy was transferred to Hershey Medical Center where attempts were made in vain to intervene by relieving the pressure on his brain, but he failed to regain consciousness. Nathaniel's adoptive parents chose to take him off life support on August 24, 2009. On August 25, 2009, Nathaniel died at the age of 7 due to a subdural hematoma in the hospital.

== Aftermath ==
Nathaniel's cause of death was determined to be complications of traumatic brain injury, with severe failure to thrive due to nutrient deprivation as a contributing factor. The autopsy also revealed that the boy had 80 total external injuries, 20 of which were injuries to his head. The prosecution argued that a pattern of neglect and abuse was evident due to Nathaniel's low weight, failure to consistently access therapeutic care, and the injuries evident from his autopsy. The Cravers' defense maintained that the boy was treated with care: Nathaniel was born premature at 3.5 pounds and never exceeded the 5th percentile of weight for boys of his age, that they had sought expert medical care, and that the boy had caused these injuries himself. However other family members reported that there was no evidence of this. Speaking to investigators, Michael Craver's mother reported an incident several months before Nathaniel's death in which she was astonished at the extent of Nathaniel's injuries. Nathaniel's adoptive grandmother described an egg-sized lump on his forehead and reported that his eyes were swollen shut. Ultimately, the Cravers were both convicted of involuntary manslaughter and released on time served after spending nearly 19 months (567 days) in jail awaiting trial.

According to Russian officials, it is one of many instances of Russian children's abuse and neglect at the hands of American adopters. Russian authorities alleged that, at the time of Nathaniel's death, no fewer than 17 Russian children had died under the care of American adopters. Russian officials expressed displeasure with the Cravers' sentences and Nathaniel's death prompted treaty negotiations between the United States and Russia. This treaty required approval by Russian authorities for adoption agencies to operate (except in cases where the adopter and adoptee[s] are related), and the monitoring of the child's adoptive home by social workers. The treaty also allows the potential adopting parent to get more information regarding the potential adopted child's medical and psychological history.

== See also ==
- Child abuse
- Dima Yakovlev Law
- List of deceased minors adopted from Russia in the United States
