= 1954 Birthday Honours =

British government recognitions

The Queen's Birthday Honours 1954 were appointments in many of the Commonwealth realms of Queen Elizabeth II to various orders and honours to reward and highlight good works by citizens of those countries. The appointments were made to celebrate the official birthday of The Queen.

The 1954 Queen's Birthday Honours were announced on 1 June 1954, for the United Kingdom and Colonies, Australia, New Zealand, Ceylon, Pakistan, and for various members of Commonwealth forces in recognition of services in Korea during the period 28 July 1953 to 31 January 1954.

== United Kingdom and Colonies ==
=== Viscounts ===
- The Right Honourable Herwald, Baron Soulbury, GCMG, GCVO, OBE, MC, Governor-General of Ceylon.

=== Barons ===
- The Right Honourable Thomas Mackay, Lord Cooper, OBE, Lord Justice General of Scotland and Lord President of the Court of Session.
- The Right Honourable Henry James, Earl of Dundee, JP, DL, Member of Parliament for West Renfrew, 1931-1945. Under-Secretary of State for Scotland, 1936-1939 and 1941-1942. For political and public services.
- Sir Oliver Charles Harvey, GCMG, GCVO, CB, Lately HM Ambassador Extraordinary and Plenipotentiary at Paris

=== Privy Counsellors ===
- Major Sir Reginald Edward Manningham-Buller, QC, MP, Member of Parliament for Daventry, 1943-1950, and for Northampton South since 1950. Parliamentary Secretary, Ministry of Works, May–July, 1945; Solicitor-General since 1951.
- Arthur Deakin, CH, CBE, JP. For services to the Trade Union Movement.

=== Baronets ===
- Sir (Walter) Russell Brain, DM, President, Royal College of Physicians of London.
- Roger John Edward Conant, CVO, JP, DL, MP, Member of Parliament for Chesterfield, 1931-1935, Bewdley, 1937-1950, and Rutland and Stamford since 1950. A Conservative Whip, 1946-1951; Comptroller of HM Household since 1951.
- Colonel Sir Francis Henry Douglas Charlton Whitmore, KCB, CMG, DSO, TD, HM Lieutenant of the County of Essex. For public services.

=== Knights bachelor ===
- Donald Richard Allen, OBE, MC, Clerk to the Trustees, London Parochial Charities.
- William Linton Andrews, Editor of the Yorkshire Post.
- Frederick Spencer Arnold Baker, Senior Master, Central Office, Supreme Court of Judicature, and Queen's Remembrancer.
- Arthur Beverley Baxter, MP, Member of Parliament for Wood Green, 1935–50, and for Southgate since 1950. For political and public services.
- Alfred Chester Beatty. For public services.
- Colonel James Geoffrey Brydon Beazley, MC, TD, DL, Chairman, Mersey Docks and Harbour Board.
- Stanley Bell, OBE, JP. For political and public services in Lancashire.
- Henry Campbell Brewer, MBE, Honorary Shipping Adviser to the Ministry of Food.
- Russell Claude Brock, MS, FRCS, Surgeon, Guy's Hospital and Brompton Hospital.
- Arthur Wynne Morgan Bryant, CBE, Historian.
- John Cameron, DSC, QC, Dean of the Faculty of Advocates. Member, Industrial Disputes Tribunal.
- Francis Hare Clayton, OBE, Lately Chairman and Treasurer, Shaftesbury Homes and Arethusa Training Ship.
- Lieutenant-Colonel Henry Charles Lowry-Corry, MC, DL. For political and public services in Suffolk.
- Richard Rylandes Costain, CBE, Chairman and Joint Managing Director, Costain Group.
- Albert James Taylor Day, CBE. Chairman, Staff Side, Civil Service National Whitley Council.
- Gavin Rylands de Beer, Director, British Museum (Natural History).
- Eric Cyril Boyd Edwards, MC, JP. For political and public services in Essex.
- Arthur Trevor Evans, Controller, Estate Duty Office, Board of Inland Revenue.
- Hamilton Alexander Rosskeen Gibb, Laudian Professor of Arabic, University of Oxford.
- Arnold Alexander Hall, Director, Royal Aircraft Establishment, Farnborough.
- Commander William Stephen Richard King-Hall, Royal Navy (Retd.), Founder, Chairman and Honorary Director of the Hansard Society.
- Lieutenant-Colonel Percy Mirehouse Hope, OBE, JP. For political and public services in Cumberland.
- John Alfred Golding Howard. For political services in Bedfordshire.
- Herbert Charles Janes. For political and public services.
- William Kerr, CBE, JP, DL, Town Clerk of Glasgow.
- Thomas Stuart Overy. For political and public services.
- Joseph Davidson Qualtrough, CBE, Speaker of the House of Keys, Isle of Man.
- Howard Morley Robertson, MC, President of the Royal Institute of British Architects.
- John Roland Robinson, MP, Member of Parliament for Widnes, 1931–35, Blackpool, 1935-45, and South Blackpool since 1945. For political and public services.
- Thomas Buston Robson, MBE, Member, Companies Act Accountancy Advisory Committee of the Board of Trade.
- Alderman Percy Alan Sanders, CBE, JP, DL. For political and public services in Essex.
- Frederick Scopes, President, Joint Iron Council.
- Francis Eugene Simon, CBE, Professor of Thermodynamics, University of Oxford.
- Matthew Arnold Bracy Smith, CBE, Artist.
- John Livingston Somerville, President, Institute of Chartered Accountants of Scotland.
- Robert William Arney Speed, CB, Solicitor, Board of Trade.
- Thomas Murray Taylor, CBE, QC. Principal and Vice-Chancellor, University of Aberdeen.
- Alexander Robertus Todd, Professor of Organic Chemistry, University of Cambridge. Chairman of the Lord President of the Council's Advisory Council on Scientific Policy.
- Thomas Tomlinson, BEM, JP, Chairman, West Riding of Yorkshire County Council.
- Francis Cannon Tudsbery Tudsbery, CBE, Founder and President of the Thistle Foundation.
- Major Arnold Horace Santo Waters, VC, CBE, DSO, MC, Chairman, South Staffordshire Waterworks Company. For services to the Ministry of Housing and Local Government.
- John Henry Wenham, JP, DL. For political and public services in Surrey.

State of South Australia

- Arthur Campbell Rymill, Lord Mayor of the City of Adelaide, State of South Australia.

Southern Rhodesia

- The Honourable Mr. Justice Walter Eric Thomas, CMG, OBE, MC, Senior Puisne Judge of the High Court, Southern Rhodesia.

Commonwealth Services

- Thomas James Young Roxburgh, CIE, Indian Civil Service (Retd.), formerly a Puisne Judge of the High Court of Judicature at Calcutta.

Colonies, Protectorates, Etc.

- Patrick Francis Branigan, Colonial Legal Service, Attorney-General and Minister of Justice, Gold Coast.
- Luigi Antonio Camilleri, Chief Justice and President of the Court of Appeal, Malta.
- John DeLisle Chandler. For public services in Barbados.
- William Kenneth Horne. For public services in Kenya.
- Arthur Werner Lewey, QC, Colonial Legal Service, Chief Justice, Northern Rhodesia.

=== Order of the Bath ===
==== Knight Grand Cross of the Order of the Bath (GCB) ====
Military Division

- Admiral Sir Michael Maynard Denny, KCB, CBE, DSO.
- General Sir Cameron Gordon Graham Nicholson, KCB, KBE, DSO, MC (13382), late Royal Regiment of Artillery. Colonel Commandant, Royal Regiment of Artillery.

Civil Division

- Sir John Gerald Lang, KCB, Permanent Secretary, Admiralty.

==== Knight Commander of the Order of the Bath (KCB) ====
Military Division

- Vice-Admiral Cecil Charles Hughes-Hallett, CB, CBE.
- General John Chaddesley Westall, CB, CBE, Royal Marines.
- Lieutenant-General Sir Euan Alfred Bews Miller, KBE, CB, DSO, MC (11736), late Infantry.
- Lieutenant-General Sir Hugh Charles Stockwell, KBE, CB, DSO (23894), late Infantry Colonel, The Royal Welch Fusiliers.
- Air Marshal Sir John Nelson Boothman, KBE, CB, DFC, AFC.
- Air Marshal Walter Lloyd Dawson, CB, CBE, DSO.

Civil Division

- Sir Eric Blacklock Bowyer, KBE, CB, Permanent Secretary, Ministry of Materials.
- Francis William Lascelles, CB, MC, Clerk of the Parliaments.
- Sir John Rowlatt, KCIE, CB, MC, QC, First Parliamentary Counsel.

==== Companion of the Order of the Bath (CB) ====
Military Division

Royal Navy

- Rear-Admiral Leslie Newton Brownfield, CBE.
- Rear-Admiral Walter Thomas Couchman, CVO, DSO, OBE.
- Rear-Admiral Robert Francis Elkins, CVO, OBE.
- Rear-Admiral George Barney Hamley Fawkes, CVO, CBE.
- Major-General Campbell Richard Hardy, CBE, DSO, Royal Marines.
- Rear-Admiral (E) Charles Littlewood, OBE.
- Rear-Admiral (S) Frederick Robert Joseph Mack, CBE.
- Rear-Admiral Richard George Onslow, DSO.

Army

- Brigadier Walter Samuel Beddall, OBE (11494), Royal Army Educational Corps.
- Major-General Valentine Boucher, CBE (30664), late Infantry.
- Major-General Charles James George Dalton, CBE (18839), late Royal Regiment of Artillery.
- Brigadier (temporary) John Cecil D'Arcy Dalton, CBE (36501), late Royal Regiment of Artillery.
- Major-General (temporary) William Alexander Duncan Drummond, CBE, FRCS (31405), late Royal Army Medical Corps.
- Major-General Kenneth Godfrey Exham, DSO (27959), late Infantry.
- Major-General George Drew Fanshawe, DSO, OBE (14521), late Royal Regiment of Artillery.
- Major-General Wilfrid Austin Lord, CBE (37538), Corps of Royal Electrical & Mechanical Engineers.
- Major-General (temporary) Robert Kirkpatrick Millar, DSO (18243), late Corps of Royal Engineers.
- Major-General Richard Murphy, CBE, MB, QHS (24226), late Royal Army Medical Corps.
- Major-General John Field Fraser Oakeshott, CBE (298), Royal Army Ordnance Corps.
- Major-General Henry Raskins Clapham Sugden, CBE, DSO (27950), late Corps of Royal Engineers.
- Major-General Geoffrey Stuart Thompson, DSO, MBE (31611), late Royal Regiment of Artillery.
- Brigadier Frank Borkman Pigott, CIE (21166), late Corps of Royal Engineers; until recently on loan to the Government of India.

Royal Air Force

- Air Vice-Marshal Hugh Hamilton Brookes, CBE, DFC.
- Air Vice-Marshal John Gerald Franks, CBE.
- Acting Air Vice-Marshal Peter Dicken Cracroft, AFC.
- Air Commodore Rowland Coats.
- Air Commodore Kenneth Brian Boyd Cross, CBE, DSO, DFC.
- Air Commodore Douglas Griffith Morris, CBE, DSO, DFC.
- Air Commodore Ellacott Lyne Stephens Ward, DFC.
- Group Captain Frederick John Manning, CBE.

Civil Division

- Philip Allen, Assistant Under-Secretary of State, Home Office.
- Terence Frederick Bird, Under-Secretary, Ministry of Transport & Civil Aviation.
- Ernest Roy Brookes, Commissioner and Secretary, Board of Inland Revenue.
- Ernest Reginald Copleston, Under-Secretary, HM Treasury.
- James Pickering Dodds, Under-Secretary, Ministry of Health.
- Eric Stead Jackson, Under-Secretary, Ministry of Supply.
- David Hume Lyal, CMG, MBE, Under-Secretary, Board of Trade.
- Charles Ernest Maker, Accountant General, Ministry of Labour & National Service.
- George Robert Oake, Under-Secretary, Ministry of Food.
- Herbert Staddon Pengelly, Principal Deputy Director of Naval Construction, Admiralty.
- William Alfred Wolverson, Director, External Telecommunications Executive, General Post Office.

=== Order of Saint Michael and Saint George ===
==== Knight Grand Cross of the Order of St Michael and St George (GCMG) ====
- Sir Hubert Miles Gladwyn Jebb, KCMG, CB, Her Majesty's Ambassador Extraordinary and Plenipotentiary in Paris.

==== Knight Commander of the Order of St Michael and St George (KCMG) ====
- Major-General Leslie Burtonshaw Nicholls, CB, CBE, Chairman, Cable & Wireless Ltd.
- Algernon Paul Sinker, CB, Director General, British Council.
- Joseph John Saville Garner, CMG, Deputy Under-Secretary of State for Commonwealth Relations, Commonwealth Relations Office.
- The Honourable Edgar Cuthbert Fremantle Whitehead, CMG, OBE. For public services rendered in connection with the setting up of the Federation of Rhodesia & Nyasaland.
- Robert Perceval Armitage, CMG, MBE, Governor and Commander-in-Chief, Cyprus.
- Sir Robert Scott, CMG, Governor and Commander-in-Chief, Mauritius.
- Alfred John Gardener, CMG, CBE, Her Majesty's Ambassador Extraordinary and Plenipotentiary in Damascus.
- Paul Mason, CMG, Her Majesty's Ambassador Extraordinary and Plenipotentiary (designate) in the Hague.
- Sir Andrew Napier Noble, Bt, CMG, Her Majesty's Ambassador Extraordinary and Plenipotentiary in Warsaw.
- Robert Heatlie Scott, CMG, CBE, Minister at Her Majesty's Embassy in Washington.

==== Companion of the Order of St Michael and St George (CMG) ====
- Frederick Blackmore Arnold, OBE, Trade Commissioner, Grade I, Karachi.
- Ivor Bowen, lately Head of the United Kingdom Ministry of Supply Staff, Australia. Now Principal Director of Equipment Research & Development (Air), Ministry of Supply.
- Cecil Stanley Harrison, OBE, Attorney-General of Jersey.
- George Hoyle, Divisional Inspector of Mines, North Western Division, Ministry of Fuel & Power.
- Alan James Ruthven-Murray, Joint Managing Director, Trinidad Leaseholds Ltd.
- Walter Fitzwillam Starkie, CBE, Director of the British Institute in Madrid. British Council Representative in Spain.
- Andrew Topping, MD, TD, Dean of the London School of Hygiene & Tropical Medicine.
- Joseph Ignatius Carroll, DCM. For services to Industry in the State of New South Wales.
- Hurtle Thomas Jack Edwards, DDSc. For services to the Dental Profession in the State of South Australia.
- John William Goodsell, Under-Secretary & Comptroller of Accounts, Treasury, State of New South Wales.
- The Honourable Julius Macdonald Greenfield, Minister of Home Affairs, Federation of Rhodesia and Nyasaland.
- Arthur Wendell Snelling, Deputy High Commissioner for the United Kingdom in the Union of South Africa.
- Colonel John Edmund Hugh Boustead, DSO, OBE, MC, Colonial Administrative Service, British Agent, Eastern Aden Protectorate.
- Edgeworth Beresford David, Colonial Administrative Service, Staff Officer Grade A, Malayan Civil Service, seconded to the Colonial Office.
- Frederick Victor Duckworth, Colonial Administrative Service, British Adviser, Selangor, Federation of Malaya.
- Brigadier Hubert James Marlowe Flaxman, British Resident Commissioner, New Hebrides.
- Charles Herbert Hartwell, Colonial Administrative Service, Deputy Chief Secretary, Kenya.
- Robert Samuel Fleming Hennessey, MD, FRCP, Colonial Medical Service, Director of Medical Services, Uganda.
- Anthony Gordon Knox Johnston, Colonial Administrative Service, Acting Administrator, East Africa High Commission.
- The Most Reverend Alan John Knight, DD, Archbishop of the West Indies and Metropolitan.
- Arthur John Loveridge, OBE, Colonial Administrative Service, Chief Regional Officer, Northern Territories, Gold Coast.
- Graham Morgan, Colonial Engineering Service, Director of Public Works, Tanganyika.
- James Lauder Nicol, OBE, Lately Educational Adviser to the Comptroller for Development and Welfare, West Indies.
- Robert Joseph Simmons, CBE, Adviser on Animal Health to the Secretary of State for the Colonies.
- Edgar Ignatius Godfrey Unsworth, QC, Colonial Legal Service, Attorney General, Northern Rhodesia.
- Theodore Rowland Williams, JP. For public services in Jamaica.
- Major-General Cyril Frederick Charles Coleman, CB, DSO, OBE, lately General Officer Commanding British Troops, Berlin, now Chief of Staff, Headquarters Northern Army Group and British Army of the Rhine.
- Charles Beresford Duke, CIE, OBE, Her Majesty's Ambassador Extraordinary and Plenipotentiary in Amman.
- Wilfrid Orrell Harrop, Foreign Office.
- Geoffrey Dugdale Kirwan, CB, MC, lately Assistant Under-Secretary of State in the Foreign Office (German Section), now Comptroller General, National Debt Office.
- William Henry Tucker Luce, OBE, Adviser on External and Constitutional Affairs, Sudan Government.
- Dermot Francis MacDermot, CBE, Her Majesty's Envoy Extraordinary and Minister Plenipotentiary in Bucharest. Lately Inspector, of Her Majesty's Foreign Service Establishments.
- James Alexander Milne Marjoribanks, Deputy Head of the United Kingdom Delegation to the High Authority of the European Coal and Steel Community, Luxembourg.
- Hugh Southern Stephenson, CIE, OBE, lately Head of Political Division, British Middle East Office, Fayid.
- Frank Stanley Tomlinson, lately Counsellor at Her Majesty's Embassy in Washington.
- Keith Unwin, OBE, Minister (Commercial) at Her Majesty's Embassy in Buenos Aires.
- Michael Sanigear Williams, Foreign Office.
- Denis Arthur Hepworth Wright, Counsellor at Her Majesty's Embassy in Tehran.

Honorary Companion

- Raja Abdul Rashid ibni Almarhumi Sultan Idris, CBE, Raja Bendahara, Perak, Federation of Malaya.

=== Royal Victorian Order ===
==== Knight Commander of the Royal Victorian Order (KCVO) ====
- William Henry Harris, CVO.
- The Honourable Sir Albert Edward Alexander Napier, KCB, QC.

==== Commander of the Royal Victorian Order (CVO) ====
- Captain Philip Lloyd Neville, Royal Navy (Retd.)
- Captain (S) Sir Frank Todd Spickernell, KBE, CB, DSO, Royal Navy (Retd.)
- John Morton Worthington.

==== Member of the Royal Victorian Order, 4th class (MVO) ====
- Lieutenant-Colonel Denis Tyrell Gibbs, OBE, TD.
- Doreen Archer Houblon.
- William George Ridd.

==== Member of the Royal Victorian Order, 5th class (MVO) ====
- Annie Black.
- Cyril Charles Coates.
- Lieutenant (Shore Wireless Service) Thomas Douglas Grosset, Royal Navy.
- Squadron Leader Frederick Henry Reed, Royal Air Force (Retd.)
- Leslie Alfred John Treby, BEM. (dated 15 May 1954).
- Leslie George Vaughan.

=== Order of the British Empire ===
==== Knight Grand Cross of the Order of the British Empire (GBE) ====
Military Division

- Air Chief Marshal Sir John Whitworth-Jones, KCB, CBE, Royal Air Force (Retd.)

Civil Division

- The Right Honourable Clarence Napier, Baron Aberdare, CBE. For public services.

==== Dame Grand Cross of the Order of the British Empire (GBE) ====
Civil Division

- The Right Honourable Angela Olivia, Countess of Limerick, DBE, Vice-Chairman, British Red Cross Society.

==== Knight Commander of the Order of the British Empire (KBE) ====
Military Division

- Vice-Admiral Sydney Moffat Raw, CB, CBE.
- Rear-Admiral (E) Alexander Davidson McGlashan, CB, DSO.
- Lieutenant-General Geoffrey Kemp Bourne, CB, CMG, CBE (23643), late Royal Regiment of Artillery.
- Lieutenant-General William John Eldridge, CB, CBE, DSO, MC (13420), late Royal Regiment of Artillery. Colonel Commandant, Royal Regiment of Artillery and Glider Pilot Regiment.
- Air Marshal Lawrence Fleming Pendred, CB, MBE, DFC.
- Acting Air Marshal Gerald Ernest Gibbs, CIE, CBE, MC.

Civil Division

- Isaac Frederick Armer, CB, MC, Deputy Secretary, Ministry of Health.
- Major-General the Right Honourable Robert Clive, Viscount Bridgeman, CB, DSO, MC, President, County of Salop Territorial and Auxiliary Forces Association.
- Andrew Lockhart Innes, CB, Legal Secretary and Parliamentary Draughtsman, Lord Advocate's Department.
- The Right Honourable William Mabane, Chairman, Civil Defence Publicity and Recruitment Committee.
- Ivan Arthur Rice Stedeford, Chairman and Managing Director, Tube Investments Ltd., Birmingham.
- Sir Philip Wilbraham Baker Wilbraham, Bt, Dean of the Arches; lately First Church Estates Commissioner.
- Geoffrey Cuthbert Allchin, CMG, MC, Her Majesty's Envoy Extraordinary and Minister Plenipotentiary in Luxembourg.
- John William Taylor, CMG, MBE, lately Her Majesty's Ambassador Extraordinary and Plenipotentiary in Mexico City.
- Sir Arthur Cecil Griffin, KCIE, OBE, lately Chairman of the Board of the Rhodesia Railways.
- The Honourable Alexander Lyell McEwin, Chief Secretary, Minister of Health and Minister of Mines, State of South Australia.
- Geoffrey Archer Walch, CVO, CBE. For public services in the State of Tasmania.

Honorary Knights Commander

- Haji Mohammed Sheriff bin Osman, CMG, CBE. Lately Menteri Besar, Kedah, Federation of Malaya.
- Ademola II, CMG, CBE, The Alake of Abeokuta, Nigeria.

==== Dame Commander of the Order of the British Empire (DBE) ====
Military Division

- Brigadier Helen Shiels Gillespie, MBE, RRC, QHNS (206162), Queen Alexandra's Royal Army Nursing Corps.

Civil Division

- Alderman Lilian Emily Isabel Jane Bromley-Davenport, JP. For political and public services in Cheshire.
- Edith Louisa Sitwell, Poet and critic.

==== Commander of the Order of the British Empire (CBE) ====
Military Division

Royal Navy

- Captain Alan Newhouse Benson, VRD, RNVR.
- Instructor Captain Peter Bracelin, OBE.
- Captain (S) William Stevens Cooper.
- Surgeon Captain (D) Roderick Macdonald Finlayson, LDS.
- Captain Godfrey Alexander French, (Retd.) (lately on loan to the Indian Navy).
- Colonel Walter Sowden North, ADC, Royal Marines.
- Rear-Admiral (E) Robert William Parker.

Army

- Brigadier (temporary) Cecil Charles Blackwell, OBE (6240), Royal Army Pay Corps.
- Brigadier (temporary) Ronald Dickeson Bolton (23642), late Royal Regiment of Artillery.
- Colonel Sheila Cooke, TD (192088), Women's Royal Army Corps.
- Brigadier (temporary) Hugo Ernest Charles de Chassiron (40369), late Corps of Royal Engineers.
- Brigadier Harold Cecil William Eking, DSO (27911), late Corps of Royal Engineers.
- Colonel Ernest Reginald Goode, MBE (41859), late Royal Army Service Corps.
- Brigadier (temporary) Richard Elton Goodwin, DSO (40616), late Infantry.
- Brigadier (temporary) St. John Cutler Hooley (26977), Royal Army Ordnance Corps.
- Brigadier (temporary) John Francis Metcalfe (41781), late Infantry.
- Colonel (acting) Charles Henry Mortimore, TD (31331), Army Cadet Force.
- Brigadier (temporary) Cosmo Alexander Richard Nevill, DSO, OBE (38525), late Infantry.
- Colonel John MacLaren Wolseley Titley (37096), late Royal Regiment of Artillery.
- Colonel (temporary) William Patrick Everard Walton (241), The North Staffordshire Regiment (The Prince of Wales's).

Royal Air Force

- Acting Air Commodore Montagu Douglas Ommanney.
- Group Captain John Robert Andre Embling, DSO.
- Group Captain Walter Frederick Lamb, OBE.
- Group Captain Cuthbert Vincent Mears.
- Group Captain Peter Theodore Philpott, OBE.
- Group Captain Charles Frederick George Rogers, OBE.
- Group Captain Alan Allnutt Saw.
- Group Captain Ernest Alfred Whiteley, DFC.
- Group Captain Albert William Younghusband, (Retd.)

Civil Division

- William Gordon Alexander, OBE, Deputy Secretary, Agricultural Research Council.
- May Andrew, Headmistress, James Gillespie's High School for Girls, Edinburgh.
- Walter Bakel, Assistant Secretary, Department of Agriculture for Scotland.
- Arthur Baker, President, Employers' Federation of Papermakers and Boardmakers.
- Bertram Benjamin Baron Benas, JP. For public services in Liverpool.
- William Henry James Benton, OBE, Chief Officer, Essex Fire Brigade.
- William Charles Black, JP, Lord Provost of Dundee, 1952-1954.
- Alfred Cyril Devenish Blanshard, Assistant Secretary, Air Ministry.
- Dennis Brook Briggs, HM Inspector of Schools (Staff Inspector), Ministry of Education.
- Thomas Cameron, OBE, Secretary, Glasgow Chamber of Commerce.
- Frank George Griffith Carr, Director, National Maritime Museum.
- William John Chalmers, Assistant Secretary, Imperial War Graves Commission.
- Lieutenant-Colonel Daniel Jackson Christie. For services as Chairman, Northern Ireland Fire Authority.
- Roland Peace Clarke. For political and public services in High Wycombe.
- Francis John Colvill, Engineer Surveyor-in-Chief, Ministry of Transport & Civil Aviation.
- Alderman Gilbert Colvin. For political and public services in Ilford.
- James Craig, Chairman, Central Agricultural Executive Committee, Scotland.
- Lilian Margaret Crichton. For political services in Scotland.
- Brooke Crutchley, Printer of the University of Cambridge.
- Cecil Francis Cumberlege, Adviser on Tea to the Ministry of Food.
- John Robert Dane, Director of the Imported Meat Division, Ministry of Food.
- Harold Davis, Chief Pharmacist, Ministry of Health.
- George Edward Raven Deacon, Director, National Institute of Oceanography, Wormley, Surrey.
- James Duff, OBE, JP, Chairman, Ulster Savings Committee.
- William Joseph Everard, Director, F. T. Everard & Sons Ltd.
- Matthew George Fisher, QC, Counsel to the Secretary of State for Scotland.
- George Alexander Fitch, Assistant Secretary, Export Credits Guarantee Department.
- Edith Alice Ford, Chairman and Director, British Committee for the Interchange of Teachers between the United Kingdom and the United States of America.
- Robert Llewellyn Garbutt, Assistant Solicitor, Ministry of Pensions & National Insurance.
- Richard Wilfrid Gilder, Collector, London Port, Board of Customs & Excise.
- Thomas Edward Goddup, Director, Milliard Ltd.
- Chetwynd John Pershall Grosvenor, MRCS, LRCP, Principal Medical Officer, Ministry of Pensions & National Insurance.
- John Lewis Anderton Grout, MC, FRCS(Ed), Senior Consultant Radiologist to the Sheffield United Hospitals.
- George Colin Grove, Deputy Civil Engineer-in-Chief, Admiralty.
- Frank Howard-Harrison, Director of Equipment and Stores, Ministry of Supply.
- Arnold Lionel David Haskell, Director, Sadler's Wells Ballet School.
- William George Head, OBE, Deputy High Commissioner for the United Kingdom in New Zealand.
- Hugh Geoffrey Herrington, Managing Director, High Duty Alloys Ltd., Slough, Buckinghamshire.
- Richard Henry Higginbotham, Senior Finance Director, Meat and Livestock Division, Ministry of Food.
- James William Francis Hill, Alderman, Lincoln City Council.
- William McLaren Hood. For services to the Colonial Office.
- Cecil James Hooker, Assistant Secretary, War Office.
- Captain William James Hutchinson, OBE, Chief Constable, Brighton County Borough Police Force.
- Gildart Edgar Pemberton Jackson, OBE, Foreign Office.
- Thomas Reginald Jacques, Director of Music to the Bach Choir.
- Colonel Edward Hamilton Carkeet-James, OBE, MC, Resident Governor and Major of HM Tower of London.
- Henry Powell Croom-Johnson, OBE, TD, Controller, Finance Division, British Council.
- Maxwell Shaw Jones, MD, MRCP(Ed), Director, Social Rehabilitation Unit, Belmont Hospital, Sutton, Surrey.
- Walter Idris Jones, Director-General of Research, National Coal Board.
- Charles Wilfred Judd, Director General of the United Nations Association of Great Britain & Northern Ireland.
- Edwin Vincent Kelley, Timber Director, Ministry of Materials.
- Sir William Arbuthnot Lane, Bt, Commandant-in-Chief, Metropolitan Special Constabulary.
- Wing-Commander James Lawson, OBE, Royal Air Force (Retd.), Director of Sport and Inspector of Recreation Grounds, Air Ministry.
- Henry Lewis, Professor of Welsh Language and Literature, University College of Swansea.
- Eric Robert Linklater, Author.
- Neville Langdon Lloyd, MB, BS, Chief Medical Officer, Ministry of Supply.
- Norman Longley, Chairman, James Longley & Co. Ltd., Building Contractors, Crawley, Sussex.
- Captain Thomas Wilfred McAllen, Lately Commodore Captain, SS Edinburgh Castle, Union Castle Mail Steamship Co. Ltd.
- Frederick Edwin-Alfred Manning, MC, TD, Director of the Post Office in Wales and Border Counties.
- Stirrat Andrew William Johnson-Marshall, Chief Architect, Ministry of Education.
- Charles James Maston, Assistant Secretary, Ministry of Labour & National Service.
- Alderman Frank Miles, JP, Lord Mayor of Portsmouth.
- Gordon Miles, MM, Comptroller, London County Council.
- William John Waldron Modley. For political and public services in Plymouth.
- Hugh Campbell Montgomery, MBE, Lately Assistant Secretary, Ministry of Home Affairs, Northern Ireland.
- Gerald Moore, Accompanist. For services to Music.
- Stanley William Nelson, Licensing Authority, Western Traffic Area, and Regional Transport Commissioner, Western Region, Ministry of Transport & Civil Aviation.
- Sir Frank Hillyard Newnes, Bt, Chairman, Eastman Dental Hospital, London.
- John Hubert Newsom, Chief Education Officer, Hertfordshire Local Education Authority.
- Reginald Northam. For political services.
- Karl Theodore Parker, Keeper of the Ashmolean Museum, University of Oxford.
- Vincent Alexander Pask, Chief Engineer, Headquarters of the British Electricity Authority.
- Thomas Redden Patterson, JP, DL. For public services in Glasgow.
- Alderman William Hamilton Jollow Priest, OBE, JP, Chairman, Plymouth Local Employment Committee.
- Henry Joseph Rayner, Chief Quantity Surveyor, Ministry of Housing & Local Government.
- William Charles Redman. For public services in Margate.
- John Sydney Rogers, Vice-Chairman, Ulster Transport Authority.
- Louis Rosenhead, Professor of Applied Mathematics, University of Liverpool.
- Archibald Edward Russell, Director and Chief Designer, Bristol Aeroplane Company Ltd., Bristol.
- Lieutenant-Colonel Geoffrey Isidore Hamilton Salmon, Honorary Catering Adviser to the Army.
- William Napier Samuels. For political and political services in Glasgow.
- Gerald Fountaine Sanger, JP. For political and public services.
- Group-Captain Geoffrey Shaw, DFC, DL, Vice-Chairman, North Riding of Yorkshire Territorial and Auxiliary Forces Association.
- Thomas Knox-Shaw, MC, Chairman, Board of Governors, United Cambridge Hospitals.
- Henry Leonard Shrimpton, MC, Chief Livestock Husbandry Advisory Officer, National Agricultural Advisory Service, Ministry of Agriculture and Fisheries.
- Edward Smith, OBE. For political and public services in Bradford.
- Andrew Stewart, Controller, Home Service, British Broadcasting Corporation.
- The Right Honourable Jean Helen St. Clair, Baroness Stratheden and Campbell, Chief Commissioner and Chairman, Girl Guides Association.
- Richard Charles Sugars, OBE, DCM, Accountant, HM Treasury.
- Hugo Leipner Tabor, Chairman, National Council of Wholesale Egg Distributors.
- John Frederick (Jack) Tanner, lately President, Amalgamated Engineering Union.
- Harold Tongue. For services as Chief Engineer, Atomic Energy Research Establishment.
- Thomas Henry Turney, lately Chairman, Northamptonshire Agricultural Executive Committee.
- Louis George Vedy, OBE, Assistant Secretary, Ministry of Fuel & Power.
- Herbert Leslie Verry, Assistant Secretary, Department of Scientific & Industrial Research.
- Gladys Kirk Wainwright, JP. For political and public services in the Hartlepools.
- William Mark Chapman-Walker, MVO, MBE. For political services.
- Alderman Walter Ward, OBE, JP, Director, John B. Ward & Sons (Bradford) Ltd.
- Ronald Stephen Wells, Assistant Secretary, Home Office.
- John Rex Whinfield. For services in the invention of Terylene.
- Cyril Theodore Anstruther Wilkinson, Registrar, Principal Probate Registry.
- Bernard Bradbury Winter, Director of Engineering, Rootes Ltd., Ryton-on-Dunsmore, Warwickshire.
- Wilfrid Simeon Arthur Winter, OBE, Assistant Secretary, Ministry of Works.
- Gerald Herbert Nowell-Withers, Senior Principal Inspector of Taxes, Board of Inland Revenue.
- Ian Denis Wratten, lately President, Royal Photographic Society of Great Britain.
- Charles Maurice Yonge, Regius Professor of Zoology, University of Glasgow.

- George Hugh Bacon, lately Director of Agriculture, now Agricultural Adviser to the Sudan Government.
- Henry Frederick Barnard, Head of Industrial Division (British Element), Military Security Board, Control Commission for Germany.
- Clarence Norbury Ezard, OBE, Her Majesty's Envoy Extraordinary and Minister Plenipotentiary in San José.
- Christopher Leonard Patrick Gilshenan, OBE, Assistant Solicitor Director, Legal Division, Allied Commission for Austria (British Element).
- Charles Sebastian Insull Mabbatt, British subject resident in Thailand.
- Major Cyril Berkeley Ormerod, OBE, Director of Public Relations, British Information Services, New York.
- Eric John Seward, Chairman of the British Chamber of Commerce, Buenos Aires.
- Charles Thomas Underhill, OBE, Customs Adviser to the Imperial Ethiopian Government.
- Athol Donald Evans, MBE, Secretary for Home Affairs, Federation of Rhodesia and Nyasaland.
- Thomas Guy Gisborne, OBE, Secretary for External Affairs, Federation of Rhodesia and Nyasaland.
- Brian Allan Marwick, OBE, Deputy Resident Commissioner and Government Secretary, Basutoland.
- Finlay Patrick McRae, Crown Solicitor, State of New South Wales.
- Ernest John Pakes, For services to the United Kingdom business community in India.
- Frank Hugh Nigel Parry, Secretary to the Cabinet, Federation of Rhodesia and Nyasaland.
- Victor Lloyd Robinson, OBE, Legal Adviser to the Government of the Federation of Rhodesia and Nyasaland.
- Bernard Fane-Saunders, President, United Kingdom Association of Pakistan.
- Andrew Cunningham Soffe. For public services in Southern Rhodesia.
- William Charles Douglas Veale, MC, DCM, ED, Town Clerk of the City of Adelaide, State of South Australia.
- Cecil Julian Manning Walters, ChM, FRACS, a Member of the Medical Board and of the Board of Health, State of New South Wales.
- William Yeo, President of the New South Wales Branch, Returned Sailors', Soldiers' & Airmen's Imperial League of Australia.
- Stanley John William Gooch, Chief Civil Engineer, Office of the Crown, Agents for Oversea Governments and Administrations.
- William Alexander Hadley. For public services in St. Vincent, Windward Islands.
- Harold Houghton, Colonial Education Service, Permanent Secretary, Ministry of Education and Director of Education, Jamaica.
- Khoo Sian Ewe, OBE, JP. For public services in the Federation of Malaya.
- Alexander MacLeod MacDonald, Intelligence Adviser to the Government of Kenya.
- Robert Smith Marshall, Colonial Veterinary Service, Inspector-General of Animal Health Services, Nigeria.
- Mohamad Javad Namazie. For public services in Singapore.
- The Right Reverend Cecil John Patterson, Bishop on the Niger, Nigeria.
- Donovan Reginald Rosevear, Colonial Forest Service, Inspector-General of Forests, Nigeria.
- Carmelo Thake, OBE, Official Secretary to the Prime Minister of Malta.
- Ivan Bernard Trevor, MC, General Manager, Hong Kong Railways.
- Lieutenant-Colonel Ewain Murray Wilson, JP, Member for Health and Local Government, Northern Rhodesia.

Honorary Commanders

- Datoh Haji Mohamed Eusoff bin Mohamed Yusoff, OBE, JP, Datoh Panglima Kinta, Territorial Chief of Perak, Federation of Malaya.
- Abubakar, Emir of Gombe, Nigeria.
- The Right Reverend Ebenezer Tamunoteghe Dimieari, Bishop of the Niger Delta Diocese, Nigeria.

==== Officer of the Order of the British Empire (OBE) ====
Military Division

Royal Navy

- The Reverend Robert Catterall, Chaplain.
- Commander Dudley Leslie Davenport (lately on loan to the Indian Navy).
- Lieutenant-Colonel Frank Alfred Eustace, Royal Marines.
- Commander Charles Robert Stanier Farquhar.
- Commander Robert Augustus Fell.
- Surgeon Commander George Lush Foss, VRD, MD, BCh, RNVR.
- Commander (E) Arthur Reginald Kirk.
- Acting Captain (S) John Henry Parkman Proctor.
- Commander (E) William Terence Colbourne Ridley.
- Commander John Richard Arthur Seymour, DSC.
- Commander (L) Patrick Lawrence Viliers Slater.
- Instructor Commander Frank Lorimer Westwater.
- Commander Frank Stanley Cable, VRD, Malayan Royal Navy Volunteer Reserve.

Army

- Lieutenant-Colonel (temporary) George Philip Doyne Adams (39260), The Bedfordshire and Hertfordshire Regiment.
- Lieutenant-Colonel (temporary) Denis Barber Ainley, MBE (62497), Royal Regiment of Artillery.
- Lieutenant-Colonel (now Colonel) Frank Elliott Allday, TD (75514), late Royal Regiment of Artillery, Territorial Army.
- Lieutenant-Colonel (temporary) Hugh James Bartholomew (63597), The Border Regiment.
- Lieutenant-Colonel John Russell Filmer-Bennett, MC (44023), The Royal Inniskilling Fusiliers (Employed List).
- Lieutenant-Colonel James Graeme Bryson, TD (69585), Royal Regiment of Artillery, Territorial Army.
- Lieutenant-Colonel John Ronald Buchanan, TD (92256), Royal Regiment of Artillery, Territorial Army.
- Lieutenant-Colonel (temporary) Donald Henry Cameron, MBE (107833), Corps of Royal Engineers.
- Lieutenant-Colonel (temporary) Stuart Whitemore Chant, MC (105159), The Gordon Highlanders.
- Major Thomas O'Grady Cochrane, MC (95083), Corps of Royal Engineers.
- The Reverend Norman Copeland, Chaplain to the Forces, Second Class (42400), Royal Army Chaplains' Department.
- Lieutenant-Colonel Percy Darrell Denman (380309), Royal Regiment of Artillery.
- Brevet Lieutenant-Colonel Ralph Alfred James Eggar, MBE (68520), Royal Army Service Corps.
- Lieutenant-Colonel Frank Lambert Freeman (47025), Corps of Royal Engineers.
- Lieutenant-Colonel Peter Francis Fane Gladwin, MBE (64572), Scots Guards.
- Lieutenant-Colonel (now Colonel) Joseph Ralph Harper, TD (36089), late Infantry, Territorial Army.
- Lieutenant-Colonel Thomas Eric Hatton (222853), Royal Army Ordnance Corps.
- Lieutenant-Colonel Robert McDonald Howatt, MC, TD (49148), General List, Territorial Army.
- Brevet Lieutenant-Colonel Denis Warburton Jackson (74678), The Queen's Own Royal West Kent Regiment.
- Lieutenant-Colonel James Robert Johnson, DSO, MC (44928), The Royal Welch Fusiliers.
- Brevet Colonel Mark John Lindsey, MC, TD (79834), Royal Army Medical Corps, Territorial Army (now TARO.)
- Lieutenant-Colonel (acting) John Charles McKee, TD (33570), Combined Cadet Force.
- Lieutenant-Colonel Gerald Edgar Moulder, TD (70316), Royal Army Service Corps, Territorial Army.
- Lieutenant-Colonel Richard William Suddaby Norfolk, MBE, TD (67641), Royal Army Service Corps, Territorial Army.
- Lieutenant-Colonel George Alfred Oliver Perkins (195321), Corps of Royal Electrical & Mechanical Engineers.
- Lieutenant-Colonel (TOT) Beresford Thomas Sherman (89857), Royal Corps of Signals.
- Lieutenant-Colonel (acting) William Alexander Shooter (150009), Army Cadet Force.
- Lieutenant-Colonel-Robert Leslie Stear, TD (65537), The Royal Fusiliers (City of London Regiment), Territorial Army.
- Lieutenant-Colonel Robert Alexander Stephen, MD, FRCS (63177), Royal Army Medical Corps.
- Lieutenant-Colonel Stanley Thompson, TD (66448), Royal Army Service Corps, Territorial Army.
- Major (local Lieutenant-Colonel) Clifford Frederic Tumber, TD (33613), Royal Regiment of Artillery (Employed List).
- Lieutenant-Colonel (temporary) Wilfred Anstice Vaughan, MBE (65577), Royal Army Educational Corps (now Retd.)
- Lieutenant-Colonel (temporary) (now Major) Alec Ernest Walkling (143850), Royal Regiment of Artillery.
- Lieutenant-Colonel Edward Douglas Lawson Whatley, TD (70732), Royal Regiment of Artillery, Territorial Army.
- Lieutenant-Colonel (temporary) John Thomas Cyril Wykes (175725), Royal Army Ordnance Corps.
- Colonel (local Brigadier) Algernon Campbell-Harris (IA-648), Special List (ex-Indian Army); at present on loan to the Government of India.

In recognition of services in Korea during the period 28 July 1953 to 31 January 1954.

- Lieutenant-Colonel William Francis Kynaston Thompson, MBE (44179), Royal Regiment of Artillery.

Royal Air Force

- Acting Group Captain John Bernard Russell, DSO.
- Wing Commander Tom Bradley (45530), (Retd.)
- Wing Commander Robert Deacon Elliott, DFC (76311).
- Wing Commander Edgar John-Harrington (73217).
- Wing Commander Idris George Selvin Hemming (31478).
- Wing Commander William Innes Cosmo Inness (33260).
- Wing Commander Donald Stuart Lindsay, DFC (40626).
- Wing Commander Anthony James Payn, MBE (33367).
- Wing Commander John Frederick Roberts (21274).
- Wing Commander DenisRaymond Stubbs, DSO, DFC (87017).
- Wing Commander Cyril Ernest Thurston (35404), (Retd.)
- Acting Wing Commander Frank Herbert (500273).
- Acting Wing Commander Mowbray Grayhurst Pearson (60927), Royal Auxiliary Air Force Reserve of Officers.
- Squadron Leader David Henry Beckett (47593).
- Squadron Leader John Aubrey Brignell, DFC (116755).
- Squadron Leader Robert Alexander Nathaniel McCready (126157).
- Squadron Leader Raymond Harrison Stephenson (50899).

Civil Division

- Archie Duncan Adam, Lately Head of Scottish Schools Broadcasting, and Secretary of Schools Broadcasting Council for Scotland.
- Robert Edward Ainsworth, Head Postmaster, Bournemouth.
- Robert Alexander, Assistant Works Manager, Capenhurst, Department of Atomic Energy.
- Charles Wood Andrew, MC, Secretary, Glasgow Port Area Grain Committee.
- Helen Gertrude Armfield, President, All England Women's Hockey Association.
- Lieutenant-Colonel Michael FitzRoy Talbot Baines, JP, DL, Secretary, County of Bedford Territorial and Auxiliary Forces Association.
- Edwin James Baldwin, Member, Executive Committee, National Federation of Meat Traders' Associations.
- Kathleen Janet Bardsley, HM Inspector of Schools, Ministry of Education.
- Mary Lloyd Bardsley. For political and public services in Cheshire.
- Lewis Rowland Barrett, MBE, Assistant Director, Ministry of Supply.
- Harry Bateman, Assistant Director of Guided Weapons (Australia), Ministry of Supply.
- Harold Ingham Bearder, Chairman, National Insurance Local Tribunal, Halifax.
- Richard Frank Bolt, MRCS, LRCP, Chairman, Willesden (No. 4) Medical Recruiting Board.
- John William Alfred Bonar, Deputy Director of Audit, Exchequer & Audit Department.
- John Leslie Bott. For political and public services in Surrey.
- John Horace Bowyer, Controller, Valuation Branch, Board of Customs & Excise.
- Robert Bratton, JP, Chairman, County Tyrone Education Committee.
- Alec Broadley, MBE, Chief Executive Officer, Marine Division, Ministry of Transport & Civil Aviation.
- Peter Ewen Brodie, Chief Constable, Stirling and Clackmannan Constabulary.
- Edwin Joseph Brown, Bursar, University of Leeds.
- John Benn Brown, Manager, Gun Mounting Department, Vickers-Armstrongs Ltd., Barrow-in-Furness.
- Noel Hawley Michael Burke, MRCS, LRCP, Lately Medical Superintendent, Cell Barnes Hospital, St. Albans.
- Lieutenant-Colonel Charles Desborough Burnell, DSO, TD, DL. For public services in Berkshire.
- Jorge Abel Camacho, Head of European Productions Department, British Broadcasting Corporation.
- Frank Atkinson Capstick, JP, lately Deputy Chairman, Westmorland Agricultural Executive Committee.
- Maud Carpenter Farrington, Director and Manager, Liverpool Repertory Theatre.
- Frederick Ernest Catchpole, JP, Chairman, English Herring Catchers' Association.
- Elizabeth Ruby, Alderman MrsChandler, JP. For public services in the Isle of Wight.
- Commander Glyn Campbell Hollingsworth Clayton, Royal Navy (Retd.), Chief Constable, Admiralty Constabulary.
- William Edmund Cleaver, Manager, Cable & Wireless Engineering School, Porthcurno, Cornwall.
- Ernest Harry Leonard Clynes, Honorary Secretary, Amateur Athletic Association.
- Edward Alfred Cockayne, DM, FRCP. For services to entomology.
- Francis Morley Colebrook, Senior Principal Scientific Officer, National Physical Laboratory, Department of Scientific & Industrial Research.
- Donald Adolphus Collenette, For services as Secretary to the Distribution Committee, Lord Mayor's National Flood and Tempest Distress Fund.
- Alderman William Collingson, JP, General Secretary, National Union of Leather Workers.
- Dora Caroline Collins, Headmistress, Bexley County Technical School for Girls, Kent.
- Albert Alfred Lumsden Collis, Chief Engineer, Office of the Receiver for the Metropolitan Police District.
- Sydney Constantine, Director and General Manager, James Dixon & Sons Ltd., Sheffield.
- Samuel James Coombes, MBE, Assistant Chief Inspector, Immigration Branch, Home Office.
- Alderman Edward Ling Cooper, Chairman, East Ham and Barking War Pensions Committee.
- John Craig, Member, East Sussex Agricultural Executive Committee.
- Charles King Crockett, MM, Chief Engineer, SS Southern Harvester, Chr. Salvesen & Co.
- Alderman Edwin Cruikshanks, JP, Chairman of Finance Committee, Rotherham County Borough.
- Alexander Dann, lately Principal Officer, Ministry of Education, Northern Ireland.
- Cedric Thorpe Davie, Master of Music, University of St Andrews.
- John Edgar Davies, MC, MRCS, LRCP, Senior Medical Officer (Wales), Ministry of Pensions & National Insurance.
- William King Davies, Town Clerk, Port Talbot.
- Israel de Keyser, Principal, Board of Trade.
- Adam Dickie, JP, Chairman, Dungannon Urban District Council, County Tyrone.
- Alderman Walter Leslie Dingley. For services to Hospital Boards in Birmingham.
- Pauline Dower, JP, Member of the National Parks Commission.
- John Eaton, Principal, Finance Air Division, Ministry of Transport & Civil Aviation.
- David Arthur Evans, Assistant Director of Aircraft Engineering, Air Ministry.
- David Esmonde Evans, GM, Principal Intelligence Officer, British Army of the Rhine.
- Frederick John Evans, JP, Vice President, Cardiff Savings Committee.
- John Benjamin Evans, Assistant Director, Council of Social Service for Wales & Monmouthshire.
- William James Eves, Chief Estate Surveyor, Ministry of Works.
- Commander William Ian Farquharson, Royal Navy (Retd.), Superintendent of Tidal Branch, Hydrographic Department, Admiralty.
- Edward William Field, Managing Director, H.W. Ward & Co. Ltd., Birmingham.
- Kester Stephen Finn, Director of Newsprint, Ministry of Materials.
- Frederick Arthur Foord, lately Chief Technical Adviser to Principal Director of Engine Research and Development, Ministry of Supply.
- William Charles Gale, DCM, MM, Financial Adviser to the Commander-in Chief, 2nd Tactical Air Force.
- Robert Angus Galloway, MC, Secretary, Royal Scottish Forestry Society.
- Alan Gardner, Deputy Assistant Paymaster General.
- Hugh Edmund Gordon, lately Manager and Secretary, Institute of London Underwriters.
- Thomas Andrew Greig, Principal, Department of Health for Scotland.
- Herbert Griffiths, JP, Chairman, Port Talbot Local Employment Committee.
- Frank Grimshaw, General Works Engineer, Leyland Motors Ltd., Leyland.
- Maurice Frederick Hackett, Principal Information Officer, Central Office of Information.
- Edward Ernest Hall, Senior Housing Inspector, Ministry of Housing & Local Government.
- Ernest John Hammond, Principal, Board of Customs & Excise.
- Wilfred Marsh Hampton, Technical Director and General Manager, Chance Bros. Ltd., Glassworks, Smethwick, Staffordshire.
- Philip Henry Harrold, Town Clerk of Hampstead.
- Ernest Stanley Joseph Hinds, MBE, Senior Chief Executive Officer, Forestry Commission.
- Fred Hirst, JP, Director, Fruit and Vegetable Canning and Quick Freezing Research Association.
- William John Benjamin Hopkinson, Principal, Ministry of Food.
- John Dobson Hornsby, MBE, Senior Young Men’s Christian Association Representative, Forces in the Middle East.
- Charles Edward Hubbard, Principal Scientific Officer, Royal Botanic Gardens, Kew, Ministry of Agriculture & Fisheries.
- Reginald Norman Huggett, Assistant Secretary, Metropolitan Police Office, New Scotland Yard.
- Samuel Percy Hughes, Headmaster, Flint Secondary Modern School.
- Lieutenant-Colonel George James Humphries, Deputy Director, Directorate of Colonial Surveys, Colonial Office.
- Ernest Frederick Hyatt, For political and public services in Paddington.
- James Irvine, Principal Collector of Taxes, Board of Inland Revenue.
- Charles Arthur Ivory, Assistant Regional Controller, London (Outer) Region, Ministry of Pensions & National Insurance.
- Alfred Edwin Johnson, Principal, War Office.
- Harold Cottam Johnson, Assistant Keeper, First Class, Directing Section, Public Record Office.
- Jean Donald Jolly, Matron, Southern General Hospital, Glasgow.
- Jenkyn Edward Jones, Principal Inspector, Board of Customs & Excise.
- Thomas Richard Jones, Controller in Wales, National Assistance Board.
- William Richard Owain-Jones, British Council Representative in Pakistan.
- John Morton Scott Jupp, MC, Foreign Office.
- Clifford Ivor King, Chief Officer, Denbighshire and Montgomeryshire Fire Service.
- John Francis Buller Kitson, DSC, Chairman, Poole Savings Committee, Dorset.
- Walter Charles Lamarque, Deputy Director, Imported Cereals Division, Ministry of Food.
- Leonard Lewis Landy, War Office Chief Security and Intelligence Adviser, Austria.
- Ivy Lang, Nursing Adviser to the South West Metropolitan Regional Hospital Board.
- Frank Charles Lant, Deputy Chief Fuel Engineer, Ministry of Fuel & Power.
- Alexander Watt Lee, lately Deputy Chairman, West Midlands Gas Board.
- James Craig Lennox, Secretary, Ancient Order of Foresters.
- Willie Edward Leopold, Principal, Ministry of Labour & National Service.
- Frank Herbert Lister, JP, Employer Chairman, South Gloucestershire District Advisory Committee, South Western Regional Board for Industry.
- Michael John Lithgow, Chief Experimental Test Pilot, Vickers-Armstrongs Ltd., Hursley Park.
- Thomas Thomson Rankin Lockhart, MC, JP, Headmaster, Cheadle Hulme School, Cheshire.
- George Matthew Lackland Logie, Shipyard Manager, Swan Hunter & Wigham Richardson Ltd., Wallsend-on-Tyne.
- Herbert Wykeham Lydall, Governor and Vice-President, Thomas Coram Foundation for Children.
- Leslie Irwin McCandless, Principal Regional Officer, Birmingham and Nottingham Regions, Ministry of Health.
- Alexander McKibbin, MBE, MM, Foreign Office.
- Captain Hugh Ingersoll Hall McMichael, Master, MV British Sailor, British Tanker Co. Ltd.
- Thomas George Marriott, Chairman, South Eastern Region, Provisions and Groceries Committee.
- Leslie George Suffield Mason, Senior Organisation Officer, HM Treasury.
- Thomas William Mathias, General Operations Manager, Shell-Mex and BP Ltd.
- William Hughes Mathias, JP. For public services in Carmarthenshire.
- Henry Ernest Matthews, National Industrial Officer, National Union of General & Municipal Workers.
- Alderman Bernard Lovegrove Maule, JP, Chairman, Newark Local Savings Committee, Nottinghamshire.
- Joseph Percival Mayo, Governor, HM Prison Barlinnie.
- Arthur George Mellor, Chief Accountant, National Sulphuric Acid Association Ltd.
- Alderman Llewellin John Meyler, JP, Member of the Pembrokeshire County Council.
- Renwick James Gunn Millar. For political and public services in Caithness.
- Major Harold James Milne, MC, DL, Provost of Fraserburgh, Aberdeenshire.
- James Corsar Mitchell, Divisional Controller, North Eastern Division, British Electricity Authority.
- Alderman Thomas Shilston Mitchell. For public services in Hampshire.
- Thomas Edward Murray, MBE, Principal, Ministry of Housing & Local Government.
- Harold Needham, JP, Chairman, Croydon and Sutton Local Employment Committee.
- George Anderson Noble, Principal, Air Ministry.
- Sydney Ombler, General Secretary, Shipconstructors' and Shipwrights' Association.
- Colonel Walter Parkes, DSO, MC, JP, Secretary, Teaching Hospitals Association.
- Willie Parkin, Superintending Examiner, HM Patent Office, Board of Trade.
- Thomas George Farquhar Paterson, Curator, County Museum, Armagh.
- Captain Denis Ives Peacock, Fleet Manager, Stratocruiser and Constellation Fleet, British Overseas Airways Corporation.
- Herbert Peart, JP. For public services in Northumberland.
- Cecil Henry Perry, Chief Constructor, Admiralty.
- William Conon Grant Peterkin. For political and public services in Fife.
- Herbert Henry Phillips. For services as Chief Commercial Officer (Railways), British Transport Commission.
- Leslie William Picknett, lately Senior Executive Officer, Supreme Court Pay Office.
- Cuthbert John Pither, Superintending Valuer, Board of Inland Revenue.
- William Thomas Polkinghorne, Head Postmaster, Brighton.
- Harold Powis. For political and public services in Essex.
- Alderman Wykeham Price, JP. For public services in Guildford.
- Philip Dent Priestman, JP, Chairman, Hull and District Local Employment Committee.
- Rudolph Pyser, Chief Executive Officer, Board of Trade.
- Ruth Railton, Founder and Musical Director of the National Youth Orchestra of Great Britain.
- Eric Reily, Senior Architect, Ministry of Finance, Northern Ireland.
- Walter Langley Roberts, HM Inspector of Schools, Ministry of Education.
- Percy Rockliff, Honorary Parliamentary Agent, National Union of Holloway Friendly Societies.
- Arnold Roebuck, Scientific Officer, National Agricultural Advisory Service, Ministry of Agriculture & Fisheries.
- Eleanor Mary Sampson, JP. For political and public services in Sheffield.
- Wilfred Harry Sansom, MC, Production Director, East Midlands Division, National Coal Board.
- John Charles Scott. For political and public services in Glasgow.
- Arthur Douglas Scudamore, MBE, Principal, Road Transport Division, Ministry of Transport & Civil Aviation.
- John Harold Knowles Sebright, Senior Chief Executive Officer, Ministry of Pensions & National Insurance.
- Alderman William Edmund Redfern Short, JP, Chairman, Birkenhead Savings Committee.
- Major Arthur Simmonds, MC, Deputy Secretary, Royal Horticultural Society.
- Captain Walter Henry Simmonds, Master, MV Glengyle, Glen Line Ltd.
- Major James Frederick Simpson, TD, Chairman and Managing Director, Simpson & Godlee Ltd., Manchester.
- William James Skardon, Civil Assistant, War Office.
- Arthur Thomas Smalley, Assistant Director, Contracts Department, General Post Office.
- James Smith, Secretary, Glasgow and West of Scotland Regional Advisory Council for Technical Education.
- Frederick Sidney Snow, Principal, Frederick S. Snow & Partners, Consulting Engineers.
- Freda Mary Sower, Assistant Regional Controller, North Western Region, Ministry of Labour & National Service.
- George Herbert Stancer, President, Cyclists' Touring Club.
- Thomas Ralph Stobart, Film Director and Cameraman.
- George Chatburn Sumner, JP, Chairman, Bolton and District Hospital Management Committee.
- Edward Tattersall, Principal Inspector of Taxes, Board of Inland Revenue.
- Eleanor Tegart, Principal, Ministry of Materials.
- Horace Thorley. For political and public services in Willesden.
- Claude John Thorne, MBE, Director, National Association of Paper Merchants.
- Horatio Todd, JP. For political and public services in Belfast.
- George William Tyler, Chief Executive Officer, Civil Service Commission.
- Marjorie Mary Tyler. For political services in Leicester.
- Robin Victor Vanderfelt, Assistant Secretary, United Kingdom Branch, Commonwealth Parliamentary Association.
- Henry James Vann, Chief Constable, Birkenhead Borough Police.
- Albert Edward Waddington, Assistant Chief Constable, Lancashire Constabulary.
- Harry Wallwork, Deputy Regional Food Officer, North West Region, Ministry of Food.
- Eva Dorothy Haddon Remson Ward, lately Central Secretary of the Mothers' Union.
- Raymond John Ward, Technical Adviser, South West Regional Office, Central Land Board and War Damage Commission.
- Ivor Charles Webley, Chief Inspector, Ministry of Labour & National Service.
- Alderman Forsgate Weekley, JP, Chairman, Grantham, Sleeford & District Local Employment Committee.
- Frederick Arthur Wells. For services in the field of industrial relations.
- Alderman James Heywood Wensley, JP, Chairman, Cheshire Wing Consultative Committee, Air Training Corps.
- Alderman Harry Clifford Whitehouse, JP. For political and public services in Dudley.
- Robert Noble Wilkinson, Manager, Barclays Overseas Development Corporation.
- Gladys May Williams, JP. For political and public services in Glamorgan.
- William Hamilton Wilson, lately Chairman, Tea Selling Section, Ministry of Food.
- William Lawrence Wilson, Superintending Engineer, Ministry of Works.
- Edna Wright, JP. For services to disabled ex-Servicemen in Northern Ireland.
- Captain John Piachaud Wright, DSO, Royal Navy (Retd.), Deputy Assistant Director, Ministry of Defence.
- Peter Yorke. For political services.
- Stuart Ainsworth, Manager of the Guaqui–La Paz Railway, La Paz.
- Lieutenant-Colonel Charles Davis Belton, British subject resident in Egypt.
- John Bull, Director of the Sudan Mercantile Co., Port Sudan.
- Henry Lower Carter, MBE, Accountant for North America of Thomas Cook & Son, Inc. (New York).
- Leslie Lobeth Coxwell, British subject resident in Brazil.
- Captain Harry Ross Dibble, District Commissioner, Gambeila, Sudan.
- The Venerable Archdeacon Paul O'Brien Gibson, Archdeacon of the Church Missionary Society, Sudan.
- Colonel John Teasdale Lisle, TD, Temporary Chief Executive Officer, Office of the Economic Adviser, Control Commission for Germany (British Element).
- Lieutenant-Colonel Desmond George McCaully, MB, BCh, Medical Officer for the Trucial Coast, Persian Gulf.
- Professor Everard Arnold Mills, Professor of Bacteriology at the Royal College of Medicine, Bagdad.
- Colonel Geoffrey Littlewood Peace, TD, lately Senior Legal Assistant, Berlin, Control Commission for Germany (British Element).
- Gerald William Vosper Rumble, Field Manager of the Anglo-Ecuadorean Oilfields Ltd., Ecuador.
- Paul James Sandison, Commissioner of Labour, Sudan Government.
- Frederick William Syer, Deputy Commissioner, Tripolitania Police Force.
- Wilfrid George Tatham, MC, British Council Representative in Greece.
- Kenneth Edwin Whittall, British subject resident in Turkey.
- John Bryan Wood, Research Section, Political Branch, British Military Government (Berlin).
- Constance Jean, Lady Bonython. For services to charitable organisations in the State of South Australia.
- Philip Alan Bowmaker, Director of Livestock and Agricultural Services, Basutoland.
- Cleaver Ernest Bunton, Mayor of Albury, State of New South Wales.
- Michael Gelfand, MB, ChB. For services to Medicine in Southern Rhodesia.
- Penelope Gordon, Headmistress, Eveline Girls' High School, Bulawayo, Southern Rhodesia.
- Francis Arthur Lewis, Town Clerk, Glenelg, State of South Australia.
- David Lyon McLarty, Director of the State Dockyard in New South Wales.
- William Ford Nicholas, Private Secretary to the Prime Minister of the Federation of Rhodesia and Nyasaland.
- Cecil Leslie Joshua Nott, Comptroller General of Prisons, State of New South Wales.
- Douglas William Leigh Parker, ChM, FRACS, Director of Orthopaedic Services, State of Tasmania.
- Ernest Parker, Chairman, Bombay Branch, United Kingdom Citizens' Association in India.
- Basil Owen Agincourt Plummer, Director of Housing, State of Tasmania.
- Richard Bestall Pounsett. For services to patriotic and charitable organisations in the State of South Australia.
- Victor York Richardson, President of the Country Carnival Cricket Association, State of South Australia.
- John Brebner Ross, Secretary, Office of the High Commissioner for the Federation of Rhodesia and Nyasaland in London.
- Bernard Thomas Squires, DM, BCh, Medical Officer, Bechuanaland Protectorate.
- George Stark, Director of the Native Education Department, Southern Rhodesia.
- Robert Stanley Steel, MB, ChM, Commissioner of the St. John Ambulance Brigade, State of New South Wales.
- Guillaume Francois Marais Van Eeden. For services rendered in connection with the setting up of the Federation of Rhodesia and Nyasaland.
- Henry James Reginald Way, Director, Geological Survey, Swaziland.
- Reginald George Squire Willis, Chairman, Punjab and N.W.F.P. Branch, United Kingdom Association of Pakistan.
- Martin Osterfield Wray, Administrative Secretary, High Commissioner's Office, Basutoland, the Bechuanaland Protectorate and Swaziland.
- Rudolf Ebenezer Mason Anderson. For public services in Kenya.
- Ivor Cresswell Welslord Bayldon, For public services in Tanganyika.
- Colin Macaulay Booth. For public services in Nigeria.
- Reginald Walter Cook, Head of Department, Office of the Crown Agents for Oversea Governments and Administrations.
- Frederick Horace Charles Dawson, Colonial Prisons Service, Commissioner of Prisons, Tanganyika.
- Peter Francis de Souza. For public services in Singapore.
- Frank Cecil Exon, Manager in Fiji of Amalgamated Wireless (Australasia)
- Philip Alexander Gordon Field, Colonial Administrative Service, District Commissioner, Karamoja, Uganda.
- Donald Selvyn Adolphus FitzRitson. For public services in Jamaica.
- Lucien Victor Genet. For public services in Sierra Leone.
- Philip Francis Howitt, Senior Education Officer (Principal, Raffles Institution), Singapore.
- John Anthony Hunt, Colonial Geological Survey Service, Chief Geologist, Somaliland.
- The Reverend Dom Maurus Inguanez, Librarian, Royal Malta Library.
- William Jarvis Mill Irving, Colonial Agricultural Service, Deputy Director of Agriculture, Uganda.
- Hugh Anthony Stephen Johnston, DFC, Colonial Administrative Service, Administrative Officer, Nigeria.
- John Kennedy (The Reverend Brother Barnitus). For services to education in the Federation of Malaya.
- Leung Cheung Ling, JP. For public services in the Federation of Malaya.
- Ian Gregor MacGregor, MB, ChB, Colonial Medical Service, Senior Specialist, Nigeria.
- Eugene Pierre Larnach Lockhart Masson, MB, ChB, Colonial Medical Service, Superintending Medical Officer (Specialist), Mental Hospital, St. Ann's, Trinidad.
- Herbert James Millar. For public services in Northern Rhodesia.
- Victor George Milward. For public services in Nyasaland.
- Malcolm Park, Colonial Agricultural Service, Director of Agriculture, Eastern Region, Nigeria.
- Vaghjibhai Shankerbhai Patel. For public services in Zanzibar.
- Henry Raymond Phillips, Lately Director of Education, Northern Region, Nigeria.
- Ebenezer Amos Sackey, Deputy Chief Electrical Engineer, Gold Coast.
- Alastair Malcolm Smith, MBE, Assistant Superintendent of Ports & Lights and Port Manager, Mombasa, East African Railways and Harbours Corporation.
- Hugh Worrell Springer, JP, Registrar of the University College of the West Indies.
- Fred Stansfield, Government Printer, Nyasaland.
- James Stirling, Commissioner of Labour, Mauritius.
- Alfred Quarcoo Tagoe, For services to the Boy Scout movement in the Gold Coast.
- James Taylor, MB, ChB, Colonial Medical Service, Director of Medical Services, Seychelles.
- Dennis Hugh Trumble, State Treasurer and Controller of Customs and Marine, Brunei.
- Frank Leslie Walcott. For services to the Trade Union movement in Barbados.
- William John Webb. For public services in Kenya.
- Charles William Wells, Colonial Veterinary Service, Deputy Director of Veterinary Services, Federation of Malaya.
- Ronald Willcock, Secretary, Lint Marketing Board and Uganda Coffee Industry Board, Uganda.
- George Arnold Williams. For public services in Bermuda.
- Ian Malcolm Gordon Williams, MBE, Colonial Administrative Service, Administrative Officer, Cyprus.
- Thomas Williams, Colonial Education Service, Director of European Education, Northern Rhodesia.
- Arthur Woo Wai Tak, MB. For public services in Hong Kong.

Honorary Officers

- Tengku Pekerma Wira, Tengku Wok Abdullah bin Din, Commissioner for Religious Affairs, Trengganu, Federation of Malaya.
- Kuan Chan Sang, JP. For public services in the Federation of Malaya.
- Ernest Sessei Ikoli. For services to journalism in Nigeria.
- Francis Chukwuka Nwokedi, Senior Labour Officer, Labour Department, Nigeria.

==== Member of the Order of the British Empire (MBE) ====
Military Division

Royal Navy

- Second Officer Irene May Austen, WRNS.
- Senior Commissioned Master-at-Arms Alfred Thomas Ayres.
- Lieutenant-Commander (E) Stanley James Barton, (Retd.)
- Lieutenant-Commander Henry Brown, DSC.
- Lieutenant-Commander (S) Albert Edward Charman.
- Commissioned Recruiter Fred Clarkson.
- Lieutenant-Commander James Alfred Crane, VRD, RNVR, (Retd.)
- Lieutenant William Benjamin James Harding, DSC.
- Shipwright Lieutenant-Commander Cyril Tuxford Haynes.
- Surgeon Lieutenant Commander Stanley Geoffrey Fox Linton, MRCS, LRCP.
- Captain Sidney Edward Shaw, Royal Marines.
- Lieutenant (E) George John Hext Stephens, (Retd.)
- Lieutenant-Commander (S) Henry Francis White, VRD, RNVR.

Army

- 22278984 Warrant Officer Class II Albert Charles Ackland, Royal Regiment of Artillery, Territorial Army.
- 7885970 Warrant Officer Class II Cyril Alexander, The Royal Scots Greys (2nd Dragoons), Royal Armoured Corps.
- Major Alan Edward Arnold (99065), Corps of Royal Engineers.
- S/57470 Warrant Officer Class II John Frederick Binstead, Royal Army Service Corps.
- 775110 Warrant Officer Class II Cyril Francis Bradley, Royal Regiment of Artillery, Territorial Army.
- 6198725 Warrant Officer Class I Frederick Alfred Britton, The Middlesex Regiment (Duke of Cambridge's Own).
- Major (temporary) Edward John Sidney Burnett, MC (325908), 10th Princess Mary's Own Gurkha Rifles.
- Lieutenant (Quartermaster) Reginald Edwin Butler (428723), Grenadier Guards.
- 22269922 Warrant Officer Class II Herbert Stuart Campbell, Corps of Royal Engineers, Territorial Army.
- Major Wentworth Randolph Chetwynd (179967), Grenadier Guards (Employed List).
- Major John Francis Lockhart Clarke, TD (85294), The Queen's Royal Regiment (West Surrey), Territorial Army.
- Major Joffre William Clayton (265528), Royal Army Ordnance Corps.
- Major (Quartermaster) Arthur Stanley Crockford, TD (90755), Royal Corps of Signals, Territorial Army.
- 1566125 Warrant Officer Class I (Artillery Clerk) John Edgar Daniels, Royal Regiment of Artillery, Territorial Army.
- 809796 Warrant Officer Class II (Artillery Clerk) Harold Claude Deacon, Royal Regiment of Artillery.
- 22244980 Warrant Officer Class II Samuel Edge, The King's Shropshire Light Infantry, Territorial Army.
- Major (DO) Charles Harris Esmond (122831), Royal Regiment of Artillery.
- 2334399 Warrant Officer Class I (Artillery Clerk) Gomer James Francis, Royal Regiment of Artillery, Territorial Army.
- Major Walter Victor Garrard, TD (40109), Royal Army Educational Corps.
- Major Kenneth David Gribbin (106723), Royal Corps of Signals.
- Major (Quartermaster) Walter Harvey Hall (287480), The Royal Berkshire Regiment (Princess Charlotte of Wales's).
- Major Margaret Austin Hardie, TD (196221), Women's Royal Army Corps, Territorial Army.
- Major (Quartermaster) William Harris (244100), The West Yorkshire Regiment (The Prince of Wales's Own).
- Major (Quartermaster) Charles William Harrison (113811), Corps of Royal Engineers.
- Major George Holmes Hoerder (136029), Royal Corps of Signals.
- Major Alexander Marshall Horace Gregory-Hood, MC (66075), Grenadier Guards.
- Major Percy Trelivin Howard, TD (66792), The Parachute Regiment, Territorial Army.
- Captain (acting) Horace Matthew Humphrey (361836), Army Cadet Force.
- Major Alexander Kirk Johnson (289781), Corps of Royal Engineers, Territorial Army.
- Major Peter Sutherland Johnson (69005), Royal Regiment of Artillery.
- Major (Paymaster) Thomas Norman Johnston (164367), Royal Army Pay Corps.
- 809254 Warrant Officer Class I Arthur Henry Lacey, Royal Regiment of Artillery.
- Major (now Lieutenant-Colonel (temporary)) Harry Lacy (222157), Royal Regiment of Artillery.
- Major Douglas Sutherland Leghorn (52928), Corps of Royal Engineers.
- Major Peter MacDonald (77645), The Border Regiment.
- Major (Quartermaster) Raymond Walter Macdonald (131267), The Gordon Highlanders.
- Major (Quartermaster) Ambrose Marriott (301770), Corps of Royal Military Police.
- Major James Martlew (145156), The Lancashire Fusiliers.
- Captain Gilbert Eric Mayers (284279), Corps of Royal Electrical & Mechanical Engineers, Territorial Army.
- 831256 Warrant Officer Class II Terence McCleary, Royal Regiment of Artillery.
- 22210250 Warrant Officer Class II Alfred McConnell, Royal Regiment of Artillery, Territorial Army.
- Major (acting) Stanley Noel Meredith (275678), Combined Cadet Force.
- Major (Quartermaster) Edward John Neal (102668), Royal Army Service Corps (Employed List).
- 2754006 Warrant Officer Class I Robert Bernard Nix, The Black Watch (Royal Highland Regiment).
- 2974308 Warrant Officer Class II James Orr, MM, The Argyll and Sutherland Highlanders (Princess Louise's), Territorial Army.
- S/5494567 Warrant Officer Class I William Parrott, Royal Army Service Corps.
- Captain Norman Phythian (371246), Corps of Royal Engineers.
- Major (DO) Thomas Henry Joseph Pine 257167, Royal Regiment of Artillery (now Retd.)
- Captain Charles William Pitt (279870), Royal Regiment of Artillery, Territorial Army.
- 22222087 Warrant Officer Class II David Plant, The Oxfordshire and Buckinghamshire Light Infantry, Territorial Army.
- Major (acting) Stoddart Prentice (77893), Combined Cadet Force.
- 822917 Warrant Officer Class I Maurice Leslie Robinson, Army Physical Training Corps.
- Captain (OEO) Gilbert Russell Russell-Smith (366808), Royal Army Ordnance Corps.
- W/7057 Warrant Officer Class II Margaret Sharp, Women's Royal Army Corps.
- Major Robert John Blantyre Simpson, TD (67250), The Royal Scots (The Royal Regiment), Territorial Army.
- Major John Robert Kilgour Sinclair (95656), The Queen's Own Cameron Highlanders.
- Major (acting) John William Turnbull, Home Guard.
- S/54952 Warrant Officer Class I Reginald William Villa, Royal Army Service Corps.
- Major John Stuart Gerard Walenn, MC (85664), The Royal Berkshire Regiment (Princess Charlotte of Wales's).
- Major (Quartermaster) William Henry Walker, TD (89516), Royal Regiment of Artillery, Territorial Army.
- 1061963 Warrant Officer Class I Douglas John Ward, MM, Royal Regiment of Artillery.
- Major (temporary) Henry Stuart Ramsay Watson (255211), 13th/18th Royal Hussars (Queen Mary's Own), Royal Armoured Corps.
- Major Albert Graham White (159510), Royal Regiment of Artillery.
- Major (temporary) Douglas Arthur Whybrow (262646), Corps of Royal Engineers.
- 22236441 Warrant Officer Class II Leonard James Yeomans, Corps of Royal Engineers, Territorial Army.
- Lieutenant-Colonel (temporary) John Reginald Henchy (204504), Corps of Royal Engineers; until recently on loan to the Government of India.
- Major Bevan Clarence Field, MC, ED, The Hong Kong Regiment.
- Major Stanley Ludgater, lately Commanding Officer, The Federation of Malaya Volunteer Force Electrical & Mechanical Engineers.
- Captain Francisco Vincente Vieira Ribeiro, ED, The Royal Hong Kong Defence Force.

In recognition of services in Korea during the period 28 July 1953 to 31 January 1954.

- 4340953 Warrant Officer Class I (Bandmaster) Charles Alfred Adams, ARCM, The North Staffordshire Regiment (The Prince of Wales's).
- Captain (Quartermaster) William Henry Eardley (355348), The North Staffordshire Regiment (The Prince of Wales's).
- 3054502 Warrant Officer Class II Malcolm Edward Chalmers Neave, The Royal Scots (The Royal Regiment).
- Major (temporary) John Foster Fenton Rooney, MB (384164), Royal Army Medical Corps.
- Major (temporary) Cyril Tobenhouse (360033), Royal Army Ordnance Corps.

Royal Air Force

- Squadron Leader George Gaskin Thompson, DFM (100982).
- Squadron Leader Bernard Webster (51206).
- Squadron Leader James Alan Wright, DFC, (106084).
- Acting Squadron Leader John Frederick Barford (58398).
- Flight Lieutenant Pearson Bell (204417).
- Flight Lieutenant Frank Cheater (46069).
- Flight Lieutenant Colin Ian Colquhoun, DFC, AFC (162098).
- Flight Lieutenant James Coppock (58188).
- Flight Lieutenant Frederick Arthur Gale (350823).
- Flight Lieutenant Thomas William Robert Godmon (202422).
- Flight Lieutenant William Arthur Sidney Harrison (190481).
- Flight Lieutenant Frank William Richards Moody (51043), (Retd.)
- Flight Lieutenant William Trevor Morrison, AFC (52111).
- Flight Lieutenant Joseph Palmer (51397).
- Flight Lieutenant Fred Hanson Perry (53608).
- Flight Lieutenant James Wishart (128981).
- Acting Flight Lieutenant Glover Ernest Austin (69104), Royal Air Force Volunteer Reserve.
- Acting Flight Lieutenant Kenneth Charles Lush (102389), Royal Air Force Volunteer Reserve.
- Flying Officer John Albert Henry Sorrell (562881).
- Warrant Officer William Haydn Graham Beacon (591070).
- Warrant Officer George Robert Beaney (590386).
- Warrant Officer Wyn Davies (514269).
- Warrant Officer Marie Donevan (884103), Women's Royal Air Force.
- Warrant Officer Arthur Greenhow (357334).
- Warrant Officer George Charles Marsh (916386).
- Warrant Officer Reginald Walter Joseph Moon (365287).
- Warrant Officer William James Bartholomew Nelles (370210).
- Warrant Officer James Robinson (523246).
- Warrant Officer Harry Frederick Whiting (112748).
- Warrant Officer Frederick John Woolley (563233).

Civil Division

- Dorothy Ablett, Sister, Fulbourn (Mental) Hospital, Cambridgeshire.
- William Albert Acott, Home Teacher of the Blind, Kent County Council.
- William Ross Adam, Senior Executive Officer, Scottish Education Department.
- Charles Edmund Addis, BEM, Assistant Works Manager, Bulpitt & Sons Ltd., Birmingham.
- Alfred George Agate, General Works Manager and Production Controller, J. Langham Thompson Ltd., Stanmore, Middlesex.
- Dorothy Julia Alloway, Foreign Office.
- Joan Mary Antony, Senior Temporary Assistant, Ministry of Agriculture & Fisheries.
- Beatrice Isabella Appleby. For political and public services in Newark.
- Margaret Esmond Armstrong, Clerical Officer, Board of Customs & Excise.
- Thomas Smith Arnott, Station Master, Edinburgh (Waverley), Scottish Region, British Railways.
- Reginald Charles Ashman, Vice-Chairman, Bristol Savings Committee.
- Thomas Bagley. For public services in Stone, Staffordshire.
- William Newson Bailey, Chief Superintendent, Metropolitan Police Force.
- Lieutenant-Commander (S) Arthur Maurice Hindley Baker, RD, RNR (Retd.), Purser, SS Pretoria Castle, Union Castle Steamship Co. Ltd.
- Stanley Herbert Baker, Deputy County Planning Officer, West Sussex County Council.
- John Benjamin Ball, Welfare Officer, Headquarters, Mid West District, Western Command.
- Edward Ballard, lately Senior Foreman of Engineer Branch, Admiralty.
- Robert John Balls, Skipper, Steam Trawler William King.
- Jack Barnes, Manager, Metal Pattern Shop, G. Perry & Sons Ltd., Leicester.
- Michael Joseph Barrett, Chemical Plant Manager, British Titan Products Co. Ltd., Billingham-on-Tees.
- Gertrude Mary Bartle, Headmistress, Cross Flatts Park Girls' School, Leeds.
- George Elton Bates, Higher Executive Officer, Scottish Home Department.
- William Ralph Beardall, Engineer and Surveyor, Boston (Lincolnshire) Rural District Council.
- Frederick Vernon Fletcher Bennett, Senior Information Officer, Ministry of Education.
- Laurence Arthur Bent, Assistant Regional Food Officer, South Eastern and Eastern Region, London, Ministry of Food.
- Reginald Betts, Official Receiver, Cardiff, Board of Trade.
- Helen Muriel Blackburne, Secretary, National Adoption Society.
- Reginald Gilbert Blake, Senior Executive Officer, Commonwealth Relations Office.
- Charles Blaney, Town Surveyor, Newry, County Down.
- Edgar Furness Bradbury, Senior Executive Officer, Ministry of Pensions & National Insurance.
- Muriel Pervenche Emilie (Jeanne) Bradnock, Make-up and Wardrobe Manager, Television, British Broadcasting Corporation.
- Gertrude Bray, Supervisor of Typists, Town Clerk's Office, Birmingham.
- Horace Brierley, JP, Chairman, Burnley Local Savings Committee.
- Elsie Blanche Bromfield. For political and public services in East London.
- Christina Thomson Brough. For political and public services in Glasgow.
- Annie Brown, Headmistress, Ormesby County Primary School, North Riding of Yorkshire.
- Lancelot Browne, Senior Auditor, Exchequer and Audit Department, Northern Ireland.
- Denis Leslie Brownlow, Director and Chief Engineer, Mirrlees, Bickerton & Day Ltd., near Stockport, Cheshire.
- Alice Maud Buckingham, County Borough Organiser, Reading, Women's Voluntary Services.
- Michael Leslie Burgan, Experimental Officer, Royal Aircraft Establishment, Ministry of Supply.
- Charles Burns. For political services in County Antrim.
- Florence Edith Margot Butler. For political services.
- James Butterworth, Local Fuel Overseer, County Borough of Wigan.
- James Cairns, Senior Executive Officer, Ministry of Pensions & National Insurance.
- Frank Norman Calver, Engineer-in-Charge, Daventry Transmitting Station, British Broadcasting Corporation.
- Olivia Mary Cape, Civil Assistant, War Office.
- Arthur Charles Careless, Senior Executive Officer, Ministry of Health.
- Fred Carruthers, Grade 3 Officer, Regional Office, Leeds, Ministry of Labour & National Service.
- Robert Simpson Caruth, Honorary Secretary, Local Savings Committee, Banbridge & District, County Down.
- Rex Henry John Gary, Senior Experimental Officer, Radar Research Establishment, Ministry of Supply, Malvern.
- Alfred Chantry, Inspector of Clothing, Ministry of Supply.
- Frederick George Chapman, Senior Executive Officer, War Office.
- Harry Albert Chapman, MM, Higher Executive Officer, Air Ministry.
- John Frederick Chapman, TD, Senior Executive Officer, Northern Army Group, British Army of the Rhine.
- Lily Olson Chapman, Matron, General Hospital, Sunderland.
- Rosalind Chapman, Home Help Organiser, Hounslow, Middlesex.
- Ernest Mark Cheetham, Executive Officer, Board of Trade.
- Louis Thornton Nicol Clark, Executive Officer, Board of Inland Revenue.
- Richard Alexander Philip Clark, Honorary Secretary, Nottinghamshire Area, Forces Help Society & Lord Roberts Workshops.
- Astell Maude Mary Clements, Honorary Secretary, Canterbury Division, Soldiers', Sailors' & Airmen's Families Association.
- Mildred Larcombe Coleman, JP, Chairman, Women's Sub-Committee, Bournemouth and Poole Local Employment Committee.
- Herbert James Ennis Colley, Machinery Inspector, Ministry of Agriculture & Fisheries.
- Gladys Norman Commander, Hospitality Secretary, Overseas Department, Girl Guides Association.
- John Cairns Connor, JP. For public services in Lanarkshire.
- Florence Ellen Conquest, Clerical Officer, Ministry of Transport & Civil Aviation.
- William Charles Douglas Considine, Senior Lecturer, Royal Military Academy, Sandhurst.
- Marjorie Hutchinson Cook, Public Health Nursing Officer, Ministry of Health.
- George Holt Corker, Manager, Derwenthaugh Coking and Chemical Works, Blaydon-on-Tyne, National Coal Board.
- Charles Rennie Cowie, Senior Executive Officer, Board of Trade, Scotland.
- Alfred Cowley, Senior Trade Officer, Oils & Fats Division, Ministry of Food.
- Thomas Cowling. For political and public services in the North Riding of Yorkshire.
- Ernest Craddock, Director and General Manager, West Hunwick Silica & Firebrick Co. Ltd., Willington, County Durham.
- Olive Maud Creese. For political and public services in Gravesend.
- William Crichton, Principal Supervisor, Admiralty.
- Victor George Critchlow, Area Engineer, Sheffield Telephone Area, General Post Office.
- Eric David Croft, Director and Secretary, British Hotels & Restaurants Association.
- Eric William Cross, Chief Executive Officer, Atomic Weapons Research Establishment, Department of Atomic Energy.
- Eugene Cross, MM, JP, Personnel Manager, Richard Thomas and Baldwins Ltd., Ebbw Vale.
- Hugh Alexander Cushnie, JP. For political and public services in County Armagh.
- William John Dabson, Superintendent, West Sussex Constabulary.
- Ian Ainslie Dalgliesh, Chief Radio Officer, British European Airways Corporation.
- William Johnston Dallas, Head Outside Engineer and Dock Superintendent, Yarrow & Co. Ltd., Glasgow.
- Arthur William Dando, lately Higher Executive Officer, HM Stationery Office.
- William John Daniel, JP, Trade Union Member, Worcester District Advisory Committee, Midland Regional Board for Industry.
- Percy Edwin D'Arcy, Secretary, Men's Division, Central After-Care Association.
- David John Pugsley Davies, Superintendent of Works, Ministry of Works.
- John Davies, JP, Chairman, Market Bosworth and Ashby District Committee, Leicestershire Agricultural Executive Committee.
- Major John Benjamin Davies, Member, National Executive Council, and Chairman, Wales Area, British Legion.
- Thomas Edward Davies, Manager, Cardiff Employment Exchange, Ministry of Labour & National Service.
- Frank Moore Dean, Senior Experimental Officer, Meteorological Office, Air Ministry.
- Kenneth John James Dean, Senior Accountant, Ministry of Food.
- Albert Ernest Delph. For political and public services in Essex.
- Norah Donoghue, Director, Catholic Women's League, British Army of the Rhine.
- Captain William Victor Doughty, Master, MV Atlantic City, Sir Wm. Reardon Smith & Sons Ltd.
- Herbert Walter Dowle, Valuation Clerk, Higher Grade, Board of Inland Revenue.
- Captain Herbert Austin Drudge. For political and public services in the Isle of Wight.
- Sidney Edwin Dudley, Superintendent, Farmfield House, Horley, Surrey.
- Isaac Main Duggie, Director, Macrae, Duggie, McPherson Ltd., Fish Salesmen.
- Claude Edward Edmonds, JP, Member, Monmouthshire Agricultural Executive Committee.
- Herbert Edward Edmonds, JP, Regional Secretary for South Wales and Monmouthshire, National Federation of Building Trades Operatives.
- Alderman George Edwards. For political and public services in Cornwall.
- Ruth Gladys Edwards, Chairman, Women's Sub-Committee, Stoke-on-Trent, Local Employment Committee.
- Percival Francis Ellis, Training Superintendent, National Oil Refineries Ltd.
- Walter David Evans, Senior Executive Officer, Home Office.
- Lieutenant-Commander Alfred George Farrance, Royal Navy (Retd.), Harbour Master, Tees Conservancy Commissioners.
- Percy George Crosbye Farrell, Assistant Director, Hirings, Cyprus District, War Office.
- Marjorie Aline Farthing, Manager, Manchester Office, Raw Cotton Commission.
- Marjorie Ellen Faulkner, Senior Executive Officer, London Telecommunications Region, General Post Office.
- Stephen Ferry, Traffic Manager, Trent Motor Traction Co. Ltd.
- Jane Field, Warden, "Oaklands" Home for old people, Dalton, Huddersfield.
- Harris Finn, Higher Executive Officer, Ministry of Education.
- Lewis Forsyth, Senior Executive Officer, Ministry of Pensions & National Insurance.
- James Edward Harold Forty, Duty Officer, British Broadcasting Corporation.
- Agnes May Anderson Fraser, County Borough Organiser, Carlisle, Women's Voluntary Services.
- William Scott Frater, Higher Executive Officer, Department of Health for Scotland.
- Donald Galbraith, Master, Lighthouse Motor Vessel May, Northern Lighthouse Board.
- Fergus McWilliam Galbraith, Technical Officer (Engineering), Ministry of Labour & National Service.
- William McArthur Gall, Manager, Barry Graving Dock & Engineering Co. Ltd., Glamorganshire.
- Walter Thomas Gann. For services as District Manager (Southport), Merseyside & North Wales Electricity Board.
- Ernest Henry Garner, Higher Executive Officer, General Post Office.
- Mary George, Deputy Chief Press Officer, Ministry of Food.
- Edward James Gerber, Senior Executive Officer, Ministry of Pensions & National Insurance.
- Major Ernest Gordon Gibbons, Road Safety Officer, NE Cheshire and SE Lancashire Road Safety Organisation.
- William Duncan Gilchrist, Chief Accountant, Scottish Industrial Estates Ltd.
- Edward Frank Joseph Goad, BEM, Horticultural Officer, French District, Imperial War Graves Commission.
- Frank Gooch, Inspector of Works, Air Ministry.
- Douglas Alfred Good, Higher Executive Officer, Naval Construction Department, Admiralty.
- Maud Gordon, Headmistress, St. John's Infants' Roman Catholic School, Glasgow.
- Harold Gould, Chief Superintendent, Metropolitan Police Force.
- Marald Dingwall Grant, Warden of the Guild of Aid, Glasgow.
- Richard Bruce Gray, Senior Executive Officer, Colonial Office.
- Lieutenant-Colonel The Reverend Prebendary Robert Dixon Rosby Greene, Chairman, Hereford and District Disablement Advisory Committee.
- Alderman John Joseph Grogan, JP, National President, National Association of Operative Plasterers.
- Sidney Thomas Gunnis, Executive Officer, Air Ministry.
- Richard Emmanual Hall, Assistant Manager, T. R. Dowson & Co. Ltd., South Shields.
- Alma Hardy, Matron, Royal Hospital Chelsea.
- Rose Ethel Harraway. For political and public services in Gillingham.
- Mabel Mary Harris, Foreign Office.
- Rhoda Annie Elizabeth Harris, Centre Organiser, Guildford Borough, Women's Voluntary Services.
- Edward George Haylett, Chief Officer, Lincoln Fire Brigade.
- Muriel Elizabeth Haythorn-Thwaite, Superintendent, Young Men’s Christian Association Centre, Gold Coast.
- Charles William Helm, Chairman, Tadcaster District Committee, West Riding Agricultural Executive Committee.
- Louis Daniel Henderson, Senior Executive Officer, Ministry of Pensions & National Insurance.
- William Henderson, Main Grade Engineer, Highways Engineering Staff, Ministry of Transport & Civil Aviation.
- Joseph James Henson, Clerk to the Licensing Authority, East Midland Traffic Area, Ministry of Transport & Civil Aviation.
- Doris May Higgs, Higher Executive Officer, Ministry of Fuel & Power.
- John Hill, Secretary to the Mayor of Derby.
- Pegeen Fear Hill, Senior Welfare Officer, Hospitals Welfare Department, British Red Cross Society.
- William Turland Hill, Air Photographs Officer, Ministry of Housing & Local Government.
- Henry Hinde, Headmaster, Hillmorton Paddox Primary School, Rugby.
- Thomas Henry Charles Hobbs, MM, Divisional Potato Supervisor, North East England, Ministry of Food.
- Cecil Arthur Hollands, Inspector of Taxes (Higher Grade), Board of Inland Revenue.
- Alfred Ernest Holloway, Chief Clerk, Manchester District Registry of the High Court, Supreme Court of Judicature.
- Reginald Bartley Hosking, DFM, Signals Officer, Ministry of Transport & Civil Aviation.
- John Dominic Howe. For political services in Portsmouth.
- James William Hubbard, Deputy Superintendent Engineer, Board of Customs & Excise.
- John Stanley Huggins. For public services in Paignton, South Devon.
- Arthur Hurst. For services as Higher Executive Officer, Ministry of Works.
- Dennis Edmund Hutchinson, JP, Chairman, Kettering District Committee, Northamptonshire Agricultural Executive Committee.
- Leonard Rochford Hyde, Chairman, Droitwich District Committee, Worcestershire Agricultural Executive Committee.
- Francis Ralph Imison, lately Chief Personnel Manager, Bristol Aeroplane Co. Ltd., Bristol.
- Frank Edward Impey, Superintendent, Paddington District Post Office, London.
- George Ernest Intin, Regional Secretary, Transport & General Workers' Union.
- Kenneth Trelawny Jago, Senior Executive Officer, Royal Air Force Record Office, Gloucester.
- Lila Rose Eugenie Jarvis, Higher Executive Officer, HM Treasury.
- Annie Jelley. For public services in County Armagh.
- Dora Gwendoline Jennings, Honorary Lady Superintendent, Soldiers' Home, Glasgow.
- Edgar Frank Johnson, Wholesale Meat Supply Association Supervisor, Birmingham City Meat Market.
- Kathleen Webb-Johnson, Chairman, Wimbledon, Epsom & District War Pensions Committee.
- Charles Evelyn Lee-Jones, District Engineer, Derby District, Derby and Burton Sub-Area, East Midlands Electricity Board.
- Evelyn May Jones, Higher Executive Officer, Ministry of Pensions & National Insurance.
- Glyn Jones, Chairman, North Wales Schools Advisory Committee for National Savings.
- Hagop Boghoss Kalemkiarian, Superintendent Clerk, General Headquarters, Middle East Land Forces.
- Fenton Alexander Kennedy, Rationing Officer, Northern Ireland Region, Ministry of Food.
- Charles John Kilby, JP. For public services in Bedfordshire.
- Thomas Lock Kinnair. For political and public services in Northumberland.
- Walter Kirkpatrick. For political and public services in Selkirkshire.
- Flora Jane Knapp, lately Matron, Princess Elizabeth Orthopaedic Hospital, Exeter.
- George Henry Laking, MM, Senior Executive Officer, Ministry of Fuel & Power.
- James Douglas Lambert, Foreign Office.
- Leslie Lancaster, Registrar of Births and Deaths, Hull.
- Stanley Edwin Langston, Secretary, English Schools Rugby Union.
- George William Lanigan, Senior Assistant Collector, Board of Inland Revenue.
- Richard Derek Lanser, Superintendent of Radio Maintenance, British Overseas Airways Corporation.
- Alfred Lawrence, MM, Manager, Newcastle Employment Exchange, Ministry of Labour & National Service.
- William Burton Lawrie, Factory Inspector, Class IB, Ministry of Labour & National Service.
- Elsie Pemberton Leach, lately Honorary Secretary, Bird Ringing Committee, British Trust for Ornithology.
- Reginald Nelson Le Fevre, Training and Education Officer, North Thames Gas Board.
- Ieuan Lewis, Senior Sanitary Inspector, Pontardawe Rural District Council, Glamorgan.
- Stanley Herbert Lines, General Works Manager, A.C. Cossor Ltd., London.
- Mary Laurie Logan, Area Officer, Northern Ireland, British Council.
- Norman Brydon Logan, Male Mental Nurse in Charge, Burnholme Unit, Northgate and District Hospital, Stannington, Northumberland.
- Albert Edward Lomax, JP, Chairman, Rawtenstall Local Employment Committee, Lancashire.
- Charles Augustus James Lowlett, BEM, Principal Foreman of Storehouses, Admiralty.
- Catherine Robertson MacArthur. For political services in Argyll.
- Henry McClelland, Senior Assistant Land Commissioner, Ministry of Agriculture & Fisheries.
- Ralph Clifford Machin, Assistant Chief Constable, Bedfordshire Constabulary.
- Robert Malcolm MacLeod, Crofter, and member of the District Council, Isle of Lewis.
- The Very Reverend Hubert MacManaway, Chairman, Fermanagh Hospital Management Committee.
- Anna Loretta McNamee, Higher Executive Officer, Board of Trade.
- Thomas McNiece, lately Clerical Officer, Ministry of Housing & Local Government.
- John Maddison, Senior Information Officer, Central Office of Information.
- John Alexander Maisey, District Inspector and Horticultural Officer, Anzac Agency, Imperial War Graves Commission.
- Mildred Kate Mann, Higher Executive Officer, Admiralty.
- Doris Louise Marshall, Clerical Officer, Tithe Redemption Commission.
- John Leslie Matthews, Chief Actuary, Savings Bank, Newcastle upon Tyne.
- Elizabeth Maybin, Headmistress, Colthurst House (Special) School, Cheshire.
- James Melvin, GM, Divisional Officer, Glasgow Fire Brigade.
- Clare Miller, BEM, Director and Manageress, Embroidery and Regalia Department, Hobson & Sons (London) Ltd.
- James Milne, MM, Higher Executive Officer, Supplies Department, Post Office, Edinburgh.
- Violet Orr Moore, Higher Executive Officer, Board of Inland Revenue.
- Arthur Jasper Morbin, Senior Executive Officer, Area Finance Office, Edinburgh, Ministry of Transport & Civil Aviation.
- Anna Morrissey, JP, Higher Executive Officer, Ministry of Pensions & National Insurance.
- Alderman John Hides Moss. For political and public services in Huntingdonshire.
- Michael Murphy, MM, District Inspector, Royal Ulster Constabulary.
- Roland Baden Naylor, Chief Inspector, F. H. Lloyd & Co. Ltd., Wednesbury, Staffordshire.
- Eveline May Nicholas, Headmistress, Ystrad Mynach Infants' and Nursery School, Glamorgan.
- Alderman Lewis Herbert Nicholson. For political and public services in Bedford.
- Agnes Nicolson, Lately Sister, Longmore Hospital, Edinburgh.
- Lieutenant-Colonel Brian Edward Oliver, TD, JP, DL, Chairman, Bury St. Edmunds Disablement Advisory Committee.
- Thomas Meeburn Oliver, Chairman, Durham and Bishop Auckland District Committee, Durham Agricultural Executive Committee.
- George O'Neill, Honorary Secretary, National Association of Workshops for the Blind, Manager, Waterloo Road Workshop.
- Ronald Leslie Osborn, Grade 3 Officer, Ministry of Labour & National Service.
- William Vincent Owens, Development Officer, Paper Sacks Ltd.
- Alfred Arthur Parker, Higher Executive Officer, Home Office.
- Gilbert Parker, Chief Shipbuilding Draughtsman, J. Samuel White & Co. Ltd., Cowes, Isle of Wight.
- Alex Reginald Parselle, Assistant Director, Transport Division, Ministry of Food.
- Ernest Roderick Paskins, Senior Executive Officer, Ministry of Supply.
- Leslie Charles Payne, Chief Executive Officer, Royal Ordnance Factory, Nottingham.
- Valentine Frederick Peaty, Senior Executive Officer, General Register and Record Office of Shipping and Seamen, Ministry of Transport & Civil Aviation.
- Stanley William Petchey, Chairman, Chelmsford Savings Committee.
- Nora Pidding, Assistant, Programme Contracts, British Broadcasting Corporation.
- Captain Harry Pilling, Master, SS Funing, China Navigation Co. Ltd.
- John Thomson Pirie, Higher Executive Officer, HM Exchequer Office, Edinburgh.
- Lilian Ada Pratt, County Organiser, Lancashire, Women's Voluntary Services.
- Henry William Prothero, JP, Chairman, Willesden Food Control Committee, London, South Eastern and Eastern Region.
- Francis John Prout. For political services in North Cornwall.
- Marie Randall, People's Deputy in the States of Guernsey.
- William John Rees. For political services in Glamorgan.
- Norman Frederick Reid, Higher Executive Officer, Air Ministry.
- Basil Bernard d'Armagnac Rhodes. For political services.
- Harold Edgar Rich, Senior Executive Officer, Board of Trade.
- Arthur Albert Ring, Senior Executive Officer, Ministry of Defence.
- Reginald Walter Ofield Ring, Senior Executive Officer, Ministry of Food.
- Jessie Walker Buthlay Ritchie, Burgh Organiser, Dunfermline, Women's Voluntary Services.
- Pamela Mary Ritchie, Assistant to General Manager (Personnel), Malcolm Clubs.
- William Ritchie, Assistant Secretary and Accountant, National Playing Fields Association.
- Morris Griffith Roberts, Chairman, Barmouth and Towyn Joint Food Control Committee.
- Alice Logic Robertson, Headmistress, Foss Primary School, Perthshire.
- Mary Helen Heron Robertson, Senior Executive Officer, Ministry of Pensions & National Insurance.
- Donald McMillan Robinson, Chief Engineer, SS Maid of Orleans, British Transport Commission.
- Septimus Robinson, Honorary Secretary, Keighley Church of England School Savings Group.
- Edith Annie Rose, lately Member of the Folkestone Local Employment Committee.
- Frank Rostron, Export Sales Manager, Ferranti Ltd., Hollinwood, Lancashire.
- Herbert Cecil Rowse, Chairman, St. Austell Joint Food Control Committee, Southern and South Western Region.
- John Dawson Rundle, Assistant Regional Manager, London North-East (City) Regional Office, Central Land Board and War Damage Commission.
- William Paterson Russell. For political services in Lanarkshire.
- Harold Ryden, JP, Chairman, Blackburn Rural District Council.
- James Abingdon Samworth, Chief Clerk, Army Sport Control Board.
- John Herbert Saunders, Assistant Electrical Manager, Harland & Wolff Ltd., Belfast.
- Thomas Herbert Scadding, Inspector of Taxes (Higher Grade), Board of Inland Revenue.
- Gustave Charles Scott, Manager, Naval Test Department, Evershed & Vignoles, Chiswick.
- Thomas Day McNeill Scrimgeour, Special Duties Officer, Production Department, Scottish Division, National Coal Board.
- Douglas Scruton, Chief Registrar, Ministry of Transport & Civil Aviation.
- Helen Mary Shannon, Chief Personnel Officer, Fine Spinners & Doublers Ltd., Manchester.
- John Hinton Sheryn, District Secretary, Shipping Federation Ltd., Cardiff.
- Peter Christie Mauldon Shillitoe, Operations Manager, Flight Operations Department, British European Airways Corporation.
- Mary Elizabeth Jane Siddons, JP. For political and public services in West Bromwich.
- Arthur Ian Forbes Simpson, Senior Engineer, The General Electric Co. Ltd., Allesley, Coventry.
- Samuel John Simpson, Headmaster, Enniskillen Model School, County Fermanagh.
- Alfred Slator, Managing Clerk, Lees & Co., Parliamentary Agents.
- George Owen Dudley Smith, Secretary, Port Labour Employers' Association, Southampton.
- James Smith, Industrial Relations Officer, Lockheed Hydraulic Brake Co. Ltd., Leamington Spa.
- John Smith, Divisional Officer, Grade II, Liverpool Fire Brigade.
- Kerrich Philip Smith, Senior Executive Officer, HM Land Registry.
- Leslie Frederick Smith, Company Secretary, Longford Engineering Co. Ltd., Bognor Regis, Sussex.
- William Smith, Secretary, Liverpool Port Area Grain Committee.
- Lilian Snelling, Artist, Lithographer and Botanical Illustrator.
- Margaret Christine Solomon, Secretary, The Housing Centre Trust.
- Eric Norman Southall, Director, Joseph Westwood & Son (Cradley Heath) Ltd., Staffordshire.
- John Harold Spaull, Assistant Chief Surveyor, Air Registration Board.
- Robert Sprott, MC, Deputy Principal Officer, Ministry of Labour & National Insurance, Northern Ireland (Died 31 May 1954. Dated 27 May 1954).
- William Stafford, Senior Sales Superintendent, Telephone Manager's Office, Post Office, Belfast.
- Phyllys Everyl Steer, County Borough Organiser, Newport, Monmouthshire, Women's Voluntary Services.
- Doreen Stiven, Personnel Manager, Dunlop Rubber Co. Ltd., Hirwaun, Glamorgan.
- Thomas Stocks, Higher Executive Officer, Ministry of Pensions & National Insurance.
- Henry Joseph Singer Stone, Youth Employment Officer, Leeds County Borough Council.
- Lucy Elinor Stone, Lately Honorary Secretary, Little Baling Infants' School Savings Group.
- Frank Stonehouse, Departmental Manager and Assistant Production Manager, Jarrett, Rainsford & Laughton Ltd., Birmingham.
- May Dora Storey, Foreign Office.
- Basil Edwin Sutton, Chief Engineer, Thames Valley Traction Co. Ltd.
- Howard James Tabor, Senior Experimental Officer, Royal Mint.
- Walter Tavendale, National Organiser, Scotland and Ireland, National Union of Furniture Trade Operatives.
- Henry Fazakerley Taylor, JP. For political and public services in Lancashire.
- Observer Commander Horace Aubrey Nelson Tebbs, Commandant, No. 7 Group, Royal Observer Corps, Bedford.
- George Tee, Works Manager, Fairey Aviation Co. Ltd., Stockport, Cheshire.
- Harry William Tettmar, Senior Executive Officer, Ministry of Materials.
- Harry Gibson Thornley, Lately Executive Engineer, Telephone Manager's Office, Post Office, Blackburn.
- Horace William Tidy, Lately Higher Executive Officer, Office of HM Procurator General and Treasury Solicitor.
- Yu Ah Tim, Compradore, HM Dockyard, Hong Kong.
- Cyril Gordon Tobias, BEM, Assistant Chief Officer, Essex Fire Brigade.
- Sydney Edward Toon, Chairman, Burton-on-Trent, Lichfield and District War Pensions Committee.
- Sybil Margaret Monica Trudgett, District Nurse Midwife, Hertfordshire.
- Alison Kinghorn Turner, Executive Officer, Board of Trade.
- William Radcliffe van Straubenzee. For political services.
- George Henry Vennard, Higher Executive Officer, Ministry of Transport & Civil Aviation.
- John William Wagstaff, Cashier, Hadfields Ltd., East Hecla Works, Sheffield.
- John Wallett, Chairman, North Northumberland War Pensions Committee.
- The Honourable Pamela Frances Walpole, JP, Chairman, Smallburgh Savings Committee, Norfolk.
- Reginald William Wardill, Architect, Ministry of Works.
- Archer Birkin Waters, Higher Executive Officer, National Assistance Board.
- Alexander Watson, Lately Mental Nurse, Glasgow Royal Mental Hospital.
- James Watson, Chairman, Stirlingshire Savings Committee.
- Henry Henson Watts, Manager, Post Office Printing Works, McCorquodale & Co. Ltd., Wolverton, Buckinghamshire.
- Reginald Dan Weeks, Higher Executive Officer, Forest Products Research Laboratory, Department of Scientific & Industrial Research.
- Frank Thomas West, Principal, Southampton Technical College.
- Ronald Arthur Weston, General Manager, Norwich Division, Eastern Gas Board.
- Robert Barr Westwood, Manager, Middleton School Camp, Gorebridge, Midlothian.
- David Campbell White, Honorary Secretary, City of Londonderry Savings Committee.
- John Harold White, Stores Officer, Grade I, Directorate of Electronics Research & Development, Ministry of Supply.
- Leonard Frederick William White, Chairman of Committee, No. 1098 (Gosport) Squadron, Air Training Corps.
- Madge Edith White. For services to the Boys' Brigade.
- William Edgar Wickens, Chief Clerk, County of Kent Territorial & Auxiliary Forces Association.
- Margaret Duncan Will, Clerk Shorthand Typist, Northern Lighthouse Board.
- Frederick James Williams, Senior Executive Officer, HM Treasury.
- John Oscar Parry-Williams, Secretary, Welsh Plant Breeding Station.
- Vivian Charles Vaughan Williams, Higher Executive Officer, Civil Aviation Overseas Facilities Division, Ministry of Transport & Civil Aviation.
- William George Williams, Managing Clerk, Sharpe Pritchard & Company, Parliamentary Agents.
- William Oliver Williams, Shift Manager, Treforest Chemical Co. Ltd., Glamorgan.
- George Wheatley Wilson, Sales Director, Belmos Co. Ltd., Belshill, Lanarkshire.
- John Wilson, Chief Superintendent and Deputy Chief Constable, Lanarkshire Constabulary.
- William Newrick Wilson, Assistant Chief Constable, Portsmouth City Police Force.
- Frank Winch, Senior Executive Officer, Ministry of Agriculture & Fisheries.
- Anona Edna Winn Lamport, Broadcasting Artist. For services to the British Sailors' Society.
- Reginald John Winney, Housing Manager, Coulsdon and Purley Urban District Council.
- William Winstanley, JP, Warden and Secretary, St. Anne's Institute, Liverpool.
- John Charles Wolridge, Trade Union Chairman, North Gloucestershire District Committee, South Western Regional Board for Industry.
- Horace Nelson Woodard, Local Fuel Overseer, Municipal Borough of Tipton.
- Harry Leonard Woollcott, Senior Executive Officer, Board of Customs & Excise.
- Sidney Francis Charles Young, Higher Executive Officer, Ministry of Pensions & National Insurance.
- Winifred Baker, Head of the Political and Economic Section, Sudan Government Agency in London.
- Geoffrey Francis Beard, British subject resident in Egypt.
- Adam George Birrell, British subject resident in Chile.
- Cecil John Bowes, British Vice-Consul at Mollendo.
- Ethel May Bridger, Personal Assistant to Her Majesty's Ambassador in Buenos Aires.
- Esther Barbara Chalmers, British subject resident in Belgium.
- Ada Crewe, Headmistress of Dunalastair Girls' School, Santiago.
- Esther Withers Dawson, Superintendent of the British Services Club, Alexandria.
- Charles Dennis Day, Inspector, Sudan Prison Service.
- Isabel Mary Agnes Doeg, MB, ChB, Lady Medical Officer, Bahrain Government.
- Leonard Bucknall Eyre, British subject resident in Sweden.
- Donald Hardwick, lately British Council Assistant Representative and Science Officer in Brazil. (Now in the Gold Coast.)
- Albert Holloway, Third Secretary at the Hong Kong Office of the Commissioner General for Her Majesty's Government in the United Kingdom in South-East Asia.
- Marian Lumley-Holmes, Personal Secretary to Her Majesty's Ambassador in Panama.
- Anna Graham Irvine, lately Warden of the St. George's Hostel, Jerusalem.
- Walter George Charles May, Administrator-General, Sudan Government.
- Hammond Joseph Mitchell, Almoner and Assistant Secretary of the Saint George's Society, New York.
- David Yorwerth Morgan, Lecturer at the British Council Office and Centre, Rangoon.
- Patrick Murphy, Clerk at Her Majesty's Consulate at Florence.
- Peter Joseph Nolan, MC, Her Majesty's Vice-Consul at Philadelphia.
- Joseph William Novella, British subject resident in Casablanca, French Morocco.
- John Leonard Paice, Temporary Senior Executive Officer, Land Commissioner's Office, Düsseldorf, Control Commission for Germany (British Element).
- Eric Charles Rose, lately British Pro-Consul at Bagdad.
- George John Rudd, Passport Examiner at Her Majesty's Embassy in Paris.
- Major Ian Francis Henry Sconce, Senior Temporary Assistant, Control Commission for Germany (British Element).
- Major William George Michael Spens, Temporary Senior Executive Officer, Office of the Services Relations Adviser, Control Commission for Germany (British Element).
- John Albert Thomson, British subject resident in Cuba.
- Frederick Arthur Witty, British subject resident in Spain.
- Alice Jane Carr, Matron, State Hospital and Home, Lidcombe, State of New South Wales.
- Joyce Mary Chalmers, Honorary Secretary, Dacca and Narayanganj Sub-Branch, United Kingdom Association of Pakistan.
- Edward Zdzislaw Cierach, Surveyor, Basutoland.
- Violet Sarah Coltheart, of Queenstown, State of Tasmania. For services rendered in connection with patriotic and charitable organisations.
- John Thomas Crowe, of Burnie, State of Tasmania. For services rendered in connection with philanthropic movements.
- Olive May Dyer, Officer in Charge of the Leper Lazaret, Prince Henry Hospital, Sydney, State of New South Wales.
- Daphne Doris Filleul. For social welfare services, especially to boys in the State of Tasmania.
- Captain Kenneth Flower, British South Africa Police, Southern Rhodesia.
- Archibald Roy Francis, MC, a Member of the Primary Schools Curriculum Board, State of South Australia.
- William Alfred Gleeson, Personal Officer, Premier's Department, State of New South Wales.
- Dorothy Ruby Hall, Assistant Director and Secretary of the Fairbridge Society.
- James Richard Hardy, a Member of the Executive Committee of the Royal Life Saving Society in the State of South Australia.
- Maidie Frances Adelaide Donovan Hemeon, of Nagpur, India. For services to United Kingdom interests.
- Katheen Amy Huston, of Launceston, State of Tasmania. For services rendered in connection with charitable organisations.
- Major Henry Bennett Marcoolyn, Indian Army (Retd.) For services to the United Kingdom community in Hyderabad.
- Edith Alice Mehrtens, of Adelaide, State of South Australia. For services rendered in connection with cultural and patriotic movements.
- Constance Kathleen Nash, Honorary Secretary, Essex County Branch, Victoria League.
- Nellie O'Connell, Matron, Gladesville Mental Hospital, State of New South Wales.
- Edwin Pallett. For services rendered on behalf of ex-servicemen in Southern Rhodesia.
- Harry Pichanick. For services rendered in connection with the administration and organisation of Sport in Southern Rhodesia.
- William Harold Possingham, of Naracoorte, State of South Australia. For public services.
- Brendan Quin, London Manager, 1820 Memorial Settlers' Association.
- Irene Eveline Ruile, of Salisbury, Southern Rhodesia. For social welfare services.
- Beryl Courtenay St. Quintin, of Salisbury, Southern Rhodesia. For social welfare services.
- John Edward Stone. For public services in Southern Rhodesia.
- Frederick Percival Vanstone, Manager, Government Motor Garage, State of South Australia.
- Elizabeth Banks, Sister-in-charge Church Missionary Society Maternity Clinic, Murgwanza, Ngara District, Tanganyika.
- William Charles Beck, Building Superintendent, East African Railways & Harbours Administration.
- Emily Ella May Bowsher, Queen Elizabeth's Colonial Nursing Service, Matron, King George V Memorial Hospital, Gibraltar.
- James Michael Beecroft Butler, Colonial Administrative Service, District Commissioner, Nyeri, Kenya.
- Evelyn Laurel Cafe. For services to African education in Uganda.
- Donald Cyril Carroll, Assistant Conservator of Forests, Sarawak.
- Vyravapillai Chelliah, Auditor, Malayan Audit Service, Federation of Malaya.
- David Lowry Cole. For public services in Kenya.
- Dorothy Colgate, Queen Elizabeth's Colonial Nursing Service, Matron, Northern Rhodesia.
- Captain Arthur Zammit Cutajar. For public services in Malta.
- Josephine Degannes. For public services in Trinidad.
- James Dodds, DFM, Civil Pilot, attached to the Kenya Police Reserve Air Wing, Mweiga, Kenya.
- Thomas Leslie Edgar, Colonial Administrative Service, District Officer, Nyeri, Kenya.
- Captain James Norris Ellis, Military Assistant to the Resident Adviser, Eastern Aden Protectorate.
- Julian Arthur Evetts, lately Assistant Secretary to the Member for Agriculture, Northern Rhodesia.
- John William Farnsworth. For services to sport and social welfare in Nigeria.
- William Guerin Fitz-Gibbon, JP, Assistant Registrar, Registrar-General's Department, Hong Kong.
- Vincent Killian Flynn. For services to African education in Northern Rhodesia.
- Eva May Fricker. For services to the Girl Guide movement in Northern Rhodesia.
- Gee Kok Weng, Chinese Affairs Officer, Penang, Federation of Malaya.
- Gilbert Rotely Gibbons, Colonial Forest Service, Senior Forester, Kenya.
- Robert James Gordon. For public services in St. Kitts Nevis, Leeward Islands.
- Jack Courtenay Green, DFC, Assistant to the Director of Civil Aviation, East Africa.
- David Smith Gray, Senior Commercial Officer, Nigeria.
- Leon Joseph Elias Hennequin, Assistant Accountant, Railway Department, Mauritius.
- Frederick Orton Hersee, Chief Health Inspector, Tanganyika.
- John Hill. For social welfare work in the Gambia.
- Paul Ingram Hill, Functional Officer, British Council, Gold Coast.
- Ernest John Hines, Chief Health Inspector, Medical Department, Uganda.
- Harold Cecil Moreton Horsley, Colonial Administrative Service, Acting Secretary for Chinese Affairs, Johore, Federation of Malaya.
- Stanley Ernest Hulse, District Commissioner, British Honduras.
- Leonard Humphrey, Senior Assistant Meteorologist, Gold Coast.
- Joan Mowat Jardine. For services to the Girl Guide movement in Fiji.
- Gopal Kondopant Joshi, LCPS, Senior Sub-Assistant Surgeon, Medical Department, Nyasaland.
- Thambiah Kandiah, Financial Assistant, Department of Information, Federation of Malaya.
- Eva Gertrude Lancaster, Red Cross Nursing Sister, Federation of Malaya.
- Victoria, Lady Lo. For public services in Hong Kong.
- Mildred Thomasina Mansfield. For public services in British Guiana.
- Sarah Matthew, Queen Elizabeth's Colonial Nursing Service, Senior Nursing Sister (Tutor), Nigeria.
- Mary Paitoo. For social welfare work in the Gold Coast.
- Pang Yong Wah, Headmaster, Bandar Hilir English School, Malacca, Federation of Malaya.
- Achilles Symeon Papadopoulos, Administrative Officer, Cyprus.
- Mary Irene Pearce. For services to African education in Northern Rhodesia.
- William James Ronald Pincott, Colonial Administrative Service, District Commissioner, Blantyre, Nyasaland.
- Roy Alexander Price, Forest Engineer, Forest Department, Sierra Leone.
- Adam Thomson Pullar. For services to shipping in Jamaica.
- Saul Raccah. For public services in Nigeria.
- Joseph Koseni Randle. For public services in Nigeria.
- Basil Reel, Senior Game Observer, Veterinary Department, Tanganyika.
- Betty Evelyn Richards, Cypher Officer, The Secretariat, Uganda.
- David James Gardiner Rose, Colonial Police Service, Superintendent of Police, British Guiana.
- Laurence John Rowed, Inspecting Engineer, Office of the Crown Agents for Oversea Governments & Administrations.
- Alice Eugenie Russell, Cashier, Customs Department, Bahamas.
- The Reverend Harry Alphonso Ebun Sawyerr, Senior Lecturer and Chaplain, Fourah Bay College, Sierra Leone.
- James William Smith, Executive Engineer, Public Works Department, Jamaica.
- Irfan Souleiman, MM, Labour Inspector, Cyprus.
- Thambimuthu Supramaniam, Financial Assistant, Contingent Police Headquarters, Kuala Lipis, Federation of Malaya.
- Mota Shayakshaw Talati. For public services in Zanzibar.
- Helene Tan, JP. For welfare work in Singapore.
- The Reverend Samuel Muthalithamby Thevathasan. For services to education in Singapore.
- Wanyutu Waweru, For services to education in Kenya.
- Albert Raymond Wilkey, Assistant Secretary (Finance), North Borneo.
- George Robert Wilson, Clerk, General Post Office, Fiji.
- Canon Robert Render Young, Principal, Union College, Bunumbu, Sierra Leone.

Honorary Members

- Dato Haji Yahya bin Abdul Razak, JP, Territorial Chief, Kuala Lumpur, Federation of Malaya.
- Prakasam Samuel, Senior Assistant Registrar, Supreme Court, Federation of Malaya.
- Tai Loi Kim, Second Legal Assistant, Legal Department, Ipoh, Federation of Malaya.
- Wan Zarazillah bin Wan Haji Ismail, Cooperative Supervisor, Department of Cooperative Development, Federation of Malaya.
- Wong Chow. For public services in the Federation of Malaya.
- Phillip Adrian Peris, Lately Assistant Engineer, Public Works Department, Federation of Malaya.
- Wan Chik bin Ismail, Interpreter, Royal Air Force Regiment, Malaya.
- Mohammadu Adananu, Sarkin Bai, District Head, Kano Native Administration, Nigeria.
- Chief Ntuen Ibok, President, The Ibibio Native Authority, Opobo Division, Eastern Region, Nigeria.
- Josiah Michael Matamni Osimosu, Education Officer, Nigeria.
- Robert Rawson Olisa, Senior Assessment Officer, Inland Revenue Department, Nigeria.
- Etta Harris. For public services in Sierra Leone.
- Haji All Yunis. For public services in Somaliland.
- The Reverend Asa Byara, Rural Dean, Native Anglican Church, Toro District, Uganda.
- Danieri Serwaniko, County Chief of Kyadondo, Buganda, Uganda.

=== Order of the Companions of Honour (CH) ===
- William Somerset Maugham, Author and dramatist.

=== Companions of the Imperial Service Order ===
Home Civil Service

- Edmund Charles Atkins, Chief Executive Officer, Board of Trade (Enfield, Middlesex.)
- Philip William Barnes, Senior Chief Executive Officer, Home Office (High Wycombe.)
- Finlay Keir Black, Senior Architect and Surveyor, Department of Agriculture for Scotland (Edinburgh.)
- Charles Bliss, Chief Accountant, Board of Customs & Excise (Leigh-on-Sea, Essex.)
- Leslie Herbert Cobley, Principal, Ministry of Labour & National Service (Worcester Park, Surrey.)
- Leonard Herbert Cryer, Principal, Ministry of Supply (Ewell, Surrey.)
- Roy Cullerne, Principal Clerk, Board of Inland Revenue (Pluckley, Kent.)
- Daniel Albert Eden, OBE, Head of Division, Tithe Redemption Commission (Orpington, Kent)
- Ronald George Exley, Senior Chief Executive Officer, Control Commission for Germany, Foreign Office.
- Sydney Gilmour, Assistant Secretary, Admiralty (Bath.)
- Samuel George Hansford, MBE, Chief Executive Officer, Ministry of Housing & Local Government (Banstead, Surrey.)
- William Frederick Howard, Chief Executive Officer, Ministry of Food (Hockley, Essex.)
- William Gilbert Lockyer, Chief Executive Officer, Ministry of Materials (Cheam, Surrey.)
- John Charles McCathie, Establishment Officer, Public Trustee Office (Watford.)
- Donald Morrell, Chief Maintenance Surveyor, Ministry of Works (Kenton, Middlesex.)
- Harry Peter Northcote, MBE, Chief Executive Officer, Air Ministry (Gerrards Cross.)
- Alfred Scott Page, Senior Chief Executive Officer, Headquarters, British Troops in Austria, War Office.
- Basil Henry Rook, Deputy Regional Controller, National Assistance Board (Tunbridge Wells.)
- Thomas David Stevenson, Chief Executive Officer, Ministry of Fuel & Power (Sanderstead, Surrey.)
- Henry William Albert Tasker, Chief Executive Officer, Ministry of Agriculture & Fisheries (Finchley, N3.)
- William Taylor, Regional Finance Officer and Chief Accountant, General Post Office, Edinburgh (Juniper Green, Midlothian.)
- Charles Towers, lately Chief Executive Officer, Ministry of Pensions & National Insurance (Watford.)
- Frank Ernest Widdicks, Principal, Ministry of Health (Whetstone, N20.)

Australian States and Southern Rhodesia

- Gerald Brian Clarke, Secretary to the Cabinet, Southern Rhodesia.
- Keith Melville Stevenson, Government Printer, State of South Australia.
- Leonard Roy Woodhouse, Superintendent, St. John's Park Hospital, Hobart, Department of Public Health, State of Tasmania.

Colonial Service

- James Donaldson Broatch, Colonial Agricultural Service, Deputy Director of Agriculture (Cocoa Industry), Gold Coast.
- Bruce Britten Donald, Colonial Prisons Service, Deputy Commissioner of Prisons, Kenya.
- George Arthur Elliott, MM, Colonial Survey Service, Director of Surveys, British Honduras.
- Edward Arthur Evelyn, Warden of Nevis, Leeward Islands.
- Leofred Aloysius Joseph, Administrative Officer, Singapore.
- Lewis Dunbar Kennedy, Commissioner of Trade & Customs, Sarawak.
- Walter Gilbert Smithers, MBE, Colonial Customs Service, Comptroller of Customs & Excise, Cyprus.
- Alexander Provan Weir, Deputy Director of Public Works, Hong Kong.

=== British Empire Medal (BEM) ===
Military Division

Royal Navy

- Chief Engine Room Artificer Daniel Frederick Baker, C/MX.56841.
- Chief Petty Officer Spiro Barbara, Malta, JX.136726.
- Chief Electrician Robert Vernon Bell, D/MX.802915.
- Chief Petty Officer Frank Biscoe, DSM, C/JX.130072
- Chief Electrical Artificer Samuel Albert Brand, P/MX.54554.
- Chief Petty Officer Alfred Ernest Britton, C/JX.128429.
- Chief Yeoman of Signals Herbert Winston Carter, C/JX.134676.
- Chief Petty Officer Frederick Mervyn Collett, D/JX.127077.
- Quartermaster Sergeant William Curran, Ply.X.1019, Royal/Marines.
- Leading Telegraphist (S) Robert Hyman Colin Davidovitz, P/SSX.661066.
- Acting Chief Electrical Artificer Ernest Victor Davies, D/MX.57397.
- Chief Petty Officer William George Mark Dukes, P/JX.144059.
- Sick Berth-Chief Petty Officer Allan Arthur Dunthorn, D/MX.50537.
- Chief Petty Officer Philip Gregory Epsley, C/J.99170.
- Chief Aircraft Artificer Nod Wesley Ferris, L/FX.75161.
- Chief Petty Officer Archibald Filson, FD/3, RNVR.
- Sergeant (D) William Edward Foord, Ch.X.4932, Royal Marines.
- Chief Petty Officer Writer Ronald Francis Forrester, C/MX.51110.
- Chief Engine Room Artificer William Norman Freathy, DSM, (D/MX.50303.
- Chief Petty Officer Abu Sujak bin Abdul Halim, L/JX.149, Malayan RNVR.
- Stores Chief Petty Officer (V) Norman Charles John Hird, C/MX.54630.
- Chief Wren, Cook (O) Edna May Jenkyn, 36167, Women's Royal Naval Service.
- Chief Petty Officer Stoker Mechanic Michael Logan, TD/921, RNVR.
- Chief Wren Cook (S) May McColgan, 23745, Women's Royal Naval Service.
- Master-at-Arms Edward Molloy, D/M.40277.
- Chief Engine Room Artificer Frederick Sidney Harold Palmer, P/MX.49516.
- Electrical Artificer 2nd Class Charles Alfred Pratt, P/MX.88296.
- Chief Petty Officer James Arthur Radford, P/JX.134281.
- Chief Aircraft Artificer Ernest Victor Brassley Shilling, L/FX.75852.
- Chief Aircraft Artificer Derek William Tunks, L/FX.75283.
- Chief Petty Officer Writer John Wood, C/MX.59851.

Army

- 7889915 Sergeant Kenneth Kitchener Joffre Ashworth, Royal Tank Regiment, Royal Armoured Corps.
- T/817246 Company Quartermaster-Sergeant Alexander Ballantyne, Royal Army Service Corps.
- MAUR/13909175 Warrant Officer Class II Yousuf Bayjoo, Royal Pioneer Corps.
- ER/2717720 Warrant Officer Class II (acting) Arthur Brady, Irish Guards (E.R. List (O.R.))
- 21124526 Squadron Quartermaster-Sergeant Robert Beattie Casson, Royal Corps of Signals.
- 2329562 Squadron Quartermaster-Sergeant William Henry Edward Chandler, Royal Corps of Signals.
- S/22293807 Staff-Sergeant Charles Clutterbuck, Royal Army Service Corps, Territorial Army.
- 6343007 Sergeant Richard Stephen Cooper, The North Staffordshire Regiment (The Prince of Wales's), Territorial Army.
- 2695808 Colour-Sergeant (Pipe-Major) Robert Crabb, Scots Guards.
- 22243014 Colour-Sergeant Stanley Crooke, The South Staffordshire Regiment, Territorial Army.
- S/19069055 Warrant Officer Class II (acting) Leonard Davis, Royal Army Service Corps.
- Na/29233 Regimental Sergeant-Major Amadu Dosso, MM, The Nigeria Regiment, Royal West African Frontier Force.
- 22223636 Staff-Sergeant George Stephen Dunn, Royal Regiment of Artillery, Territorial Army.
- 2156802 Staff-Sergeant George Douglas Fogg, Corps of Royal Engineers.
- 22836040 Staff-Sergeant (acting) Cyril Halstead, Royal Army Ordnance Corps.
- 22520446 Sergeant Ernest Harrhy, Army Catering Corps, Territorial Army (attached The North Somerset Yeomanry, Royal Armoured Corps, TA.)
- 788443 Warrant Officer Class II (acting) John Hodgson, Corps of Royal Electrical & Mechanical Engineers.
- S/6479223 Warrant Officer Class I (acting) Henry Albert Jenkins, Royal Army Service Corps.
- 7881404 Warrant Officer Class II (acting) James Alfred Jones, Royal Tank Regiment, Royal Armoured Corps.
- 2001524 Sergeant (acting) Walter David Jones, Corps of Royal Engineers.
- Corporal Kaisara Manwedi, Bechuanaland Protectorate Police.
- 1447864 Sergeant (Artillery Clerk) George Stanley Lawrence, Royal Regiment of Artillery, Territorial Army.
- 22210679 Sergeant John Lee, The Royal Northumberland Fusiliers, Territorial Army.
- 840375 Warrant Officer Class I (acting) Harry Clifford Lungley, Royal Regiment of Artillery.
- 11051358 Staff-Sergeant (acting) Harry Charles Maggs, Military Provost Staff Corps.
- T/3704310 Band Sergeant-Major (local) Francis Michael Mahon, Royal Army Service Corps.
- 5572092 Sergeant Douglas Henry William Matthews, Corps of Royal Military Police.
- 726996 Sergeant Hector Donald McWilliam, Royal Regiment of Artillery, Territorial Army.
- S/21016898 Staff-Sergeant John Miller, Royal Army Service Corps, Territorial Army.
- 225146 Staff-Sergeant William Colin Mitchell, Corps of Royal Electrical & Mechanical Engineers.
- GC/12706 Regimental Sergeant-Major Nawa Mosffl, The Gold Coast Regiment, Royal West African Frontier Force.
- 21125655 Staff-Sergeant (acting) Henry Pace, Corps of Royal Electrical & Mechanical Engineers.
- 14434495 Sergeant Arthur Harry Pargeter, Corps of Royal Military Police.
- 2204545 Squadron Quartermaster-Sergeant Harry Porter, Corps of Royal Engineers, Territorial Army.
- T/22280938 Company Quartermaster-Sergeant James Rankin, Royal Army Service Corps, Territorial Army.
- 22264016 Warrant Officer Class I (acting) Lynn Hughes Richardson, Corps of Royal Electrical & Mechanical Engineers.
- Warrant Officer Class II (acting) James Crane Robertson, The Hong Kong Regiment.
- 22220292 Sergeant Arthur Raymond Simpson Scotney, The Royal Lincolnshire Regiment, Territorial Army.
- 22210216 Warrant Officer Class II (acting) Tognevald Donald McPhail Seatter, Royal Regiment of Artillery, Territorial Army.
- 22221294 Colour-Sergeant Ronald William Frederick Sims, The Royal Fusiliers (City of London Regiment), Territorial Army.
- 4906386 Sergeant Horace William Stockham, The South Staffordshire Regiment, Territorial Army.
- T/6285296 Sergeant Joseph Swaine, Royal Army Service Corps.
- 22543202 Sergeant Alexander Taylor, Corps of Royal Engineers.
- Q/308736 Corporal Betty Terry, Queen Alexandra's Royal Army Nursing Corps.
- 22257361 Warrant Officer Class II (acting) Albert Victor Waknell, Corps of Royal Electrical & Mechanical Engineers.
- W/163111 Warrant Officer Class II (acting) Gladys Warden, Women's Royal Army Corps.
- 2978145 Squadron Quartermaster-Sergeant James Warren, Royal Corps of Signals.
- 22292906 Warrant Officer Class II (acting) Gibson Carlisle White, Royal Army Ordnance Corps.
- 4606688 Sergeant Thomas Woodcock, Royal Regiment of Artillery, Territorial Army.
- 6398849 Squadron Quartermaster-Sergeant James Harry Ernest Woolgar, MM, Royal Corps of Signals.

In recognition of services in Korea during the period 28 July 1953 to 31 January 1954.

- 833356 Warrant Officer Class I (acting) Charles Albert Hugh Ilsley, Royal Regiment of Artillery.
- 1876552 Warrant Officer Class II (acting) Leopard Charles Look, Corps of Royal Engineers.

Royal Air Force

- 569979 Flight Sergeant Arthur Walter Bennett.
- 538316 Flight Sergeant Ralph Derick Brown.
- 1516011 Flight Sergeant Stanley Burrows.
- 2688001 Flight Sergeant Arthur Dwyer, Royal Auxiliary Air Force.
- 884202 Flight Sergeant Winefride Gibbons, Women's Royal Air Force.
- 549598 Flight Sergeant John Wright Hillsden.
- 944181 Flight Sergeant Hugo Houghton.
- 517624 Flight Sergeant William Harold Hubbard.
- 522411 Flight Sergeant Brian Hughes.
- 336600 Flight Sergeant Redvers Baden Ince.
- 577546 Flight Sergeant Leonard Charles Knight.
- 4013014 Flight Sergeant Stanley McArthur.
- 1102953 Flight Sergeant John Myers.
- 513941 Flight Sergeant Leslie Charles Finn.
- 536247 Flight Sergeant George Harcourt Roberts.
- 954607 Acting Flight Sergeant George Cuthbert Fletcher.
- 2073135 Sergeant Mary Byrne, Women's Royal Air Force.
- 4021614 Sergeant Paul Richard Caley.
- 1185140 Sergeant John Robert Campbell.
- 576903 Sergeant Vernon Walter Richard Lloyd.
- 4030958 Sergeant Eric Charles Longhurst.
- 2676433 Sergeant Frank Manning, Royal Auxiliary Air Force.
- 525169 Sergeant Harry Marsden.
- 534815 Sergeant George Roberts.
- 952790 Sergeant Jack Bernard Scarff.
- 644986 Sergeant Ronald Frederick Tooke.
- 535383 Senior Technician John Armstrong.
- 3503757 Corporal Technician Lionel Anthony McGinn.
- 579815 Senior Aircraftman Ronald William Ernest Newman.
- 4055717 Senior Aircraftman Keith Alexander Pardoe.

Civil Division

- Jean Aitkenhead, Member, Women's Voluntary Services, Glasgow.
- Stanley Frank Anderson, Technical Assistant (MT) Grade II, Admiralty (Bexley Heath, Kent.)
- John Joseph Patrick Barnett, Sub-Postmaster, Frances Street Town Sub-Office, Woolwich, SE. 18.
- Leslie Thomas Bassett, Fireman, London Fire Brigade (Stockwell, SW.9)
- Henry Richard Batchelor, Foreman, Submarine Cables Ltd. (Goodmayes, Essex.)
- Leonard Beal, Boatswain, SS Brighton, British Transport Commission (Newhaven, Sussex.)
- Alexander McKay Beattie, Clerk of Works, Grade II, Royal Air Force Edzell (Brechin, Angus.)
- John Henry Benn, Table Knife Manager, John Blyde Ltd., Sheffield.
- Mary Vere Bertie, Centre Organiser, Glendale Rural District, Northumberland, Women's Voluntary Services (Berwick-on Tweed.)
- Charles Berwick, Office Keeper, Grade II, Board of Trade (East Barnet, Hertfordshire)
- William Francis Bingham, Member, Dover LSA Company, Coast Life Saving Corps.
- Ernest Bishop, Honorary Collector, East Cannock Colliery Savings Group (Great Wyrley, Staffordshire.)
- James Black, Head Chancery Guard, Her Majesty's Embassy, Tehran.
- Anita Eleanor Larke Blakemore, Deputy County Borough Organiser, Halifax, Women's Voluntary Services.
- Harold Goodwin Bodger, Draughtsman, R.A.S.C. Training School, War Office (Farnborough.)
- Wilfred Lionel Bone, Senior General Building Foreman, R. G. Carter Ltd., Norwich.
- George Arthur Bowles, Technician Class I, Telephone Manager's Office, Edinburgh.
- John William Braddick, Deckhand, Steam Trawler Slebech (Milford Haven.)
- Alfred Thomas Brook, Laboratory Worker, Grade 'A', Armament Research Establishment, Ministry of Supply (Woolwich, SE.18)
- Archibald Frederick Buckle, Foreman, Jealott's Hill Research Station, Berkshire (Warfield, Near Bracknell.)
- Cyril Louis Burns, Foreign Office (Wandsworth, SW.18.)
- Thomas Callaghan, Brickmaker, B. Whitaker & Sons Ltd., Leeds.
- William John Cambridge, Senior Overlooker, Royal Ordnance Factories, Woolwich (Bexleyheath, Kent.)
- Emamuel Camilleri, Chargeman of Skilled Labourers, Admiralty Floating Dock, Malta.
- Richard Charles Carr, Coastguardsman, Cley, Norfolk.
- Alfred James Castle, MM, Chief Inspector, War Department Constabulary (Ambrosden, Oxford.)
- William James Branstom Chapple, Carpenter and Joiner, Eastern Electricity Board (Cambridge.)
- William Watson Charlton, Checkweighman, Stargate Colliery, Durham Division, National Coal Board (Ryton-on-Tyne, County Durham.)
- Alfred Ezra Cheshire, Sub-Postmaster, North Marston, Bletchley, Buckinghamshire.
- Jane Chilvers, Honorary Collector, Lucas Road and District Savings Group, Colchester.
- George Perry Clark, Distribution Foreman, Brighouse Works, North Eastern Gas Board (Brighouse, Yorkshire.)
- Arthur Clifford Clarke, Brazier, Hammerman, Razor and Saw Piercer, Roberts & Belk Ltd., Sheffield.
- James Clarke, Sub-District Commandant, Ulster Special Constabulary (Upperlands, County Londonderry.)
- Andrew Clarkson, Blacksmith, Colvilles Ltd., Motherwell.
- William George Collins, Assistant Superintendent, Telegraph Branch, London Telecommunications Region, General Post Office, (Uxbridge, Middlesex.)
- John Cook, Foreman, School of Infantry, War Office, Hythe.
- James Cormack, Inspector and Deputy Chief Constable, Orkney Constabulary (Kirkwall.)
- Hugh William Courtney, Engineer and Foreman Fitter, John Compton Ltd., Linen Manufacturers, County Armagh.
- Leo Kelly Crossley, Checkweighman, Bank Hall Colliery, North Western Division, National Coal Board (Burnley.)
- Leslie Charles Crowe, Chief Studio Attendant, British Broadcasting Corporation (Bexley, Kent.)
- Frederick Thomas Curd, Chief Storeman, County of Cornwall Territorial & Auxiliary Forces Association (Truro.)
- Charles Cuttler, Chief Saw Sharpener, J. Gliksten & Son Ltd., London (Romford, Essex.)
- Victor, Alfred Dale, Deckhand, Research Vessels, Ministry of Agriculture & Fisheries (Lowestoft.)
- Annie Margaret Davies, Senior Leading Firewoman, Carmarthenshire & Cardiganshire Fire Service (Carmarthen.)
- David Adolphus Dennis, Inspector, Metropolitan Special Constabulary (Upper Norwood, SE.19.)
- Thomas Dick, Foreman, Victor Products (Wallsend) Ltd., Wallsend-on-Tyne.
- Doris Edith Dickenson, Overseer (F), Michaelson Road Branch Post Office, Barrow-in-Furness.
- Thomas Doughty, Foreman Carpenter, Mersham-le-Hatch Estate, Kent.
- Wilfred Lewis Doughty, Head of Security Guard, HM Treasury (Addiscombe, Surrey.)
- John Foster Drake, DFC, Head Observer, Post E1, Henley-in-Arden, No.8 Group, Royal Observer Corps.
- Percy Reginald Drake, School Staff Instructor, Campbell College, Belfast.
- Frederick Earey, Farm Worker, Purles Hill, Great Maplestead, Essex.
- James Eastham, Warden, Territorial Army Drill Hall, Ashton-under-Lyne.
- May Edwards, Chief Supervisor (F), Post Office Telephone Exchange, Southampton.
- Frederick Victor Ellis, Office Keeper, Grade I, Ministry of Pensions & National Insurance (Blackpool.)
- Samuel Adams Emptage, Quarterdeckman, SS Orion, Orient Steam Navigation Co. Ltd. (Southend.)
- Charles James Etheridge, Chargehand, British Sugar Corporation Factory, Cantley, Norfolk (Strumpshaw, Norwich.)
- John Elias Evans, Shift Charge Engineer, Dolgarrog Hydro-Electric Station, Merseyside and North Wales Division, British Electricity Authority (Llandudno.)
- Lionel Donald Foster, Inspector, Carmarthenshire Constabulary (Cardiff.)
- Frederick Fox, MM, Chargehand, Royal Signals Establishment, War Office (Gosport)
- Frank Harold Fryer, Distribution Superintendent, Darlington Gasworks, Northern Gas Board.
- Thomas Gallagher, Yard Foreman, Uddingston Gas Works, Scottish Gas Board.
- Ada Garland, Fabric Worker, Royal Aircraft Establishment, Ministry of Supply, Farnborough (Aldershot.)
- Reginald Ernest Alfred Gates, Toolmaker, Royal Ordnance Factory, Cardiff.
- Dorothy Gilruth, Street Group Collector, Victoria Street Savings Group, Edinburgh.
- Alfred Henry Goggin, Research and Experimental Mechanic I, Royal Aircraft Establishment, Ministry of Supply, Farnborough.
- Bessie Goodall, Centre Organiser, Felixstowe, Women's Voluntary Services.
- Margaret Gray, Honorary Collector, Street Savings Group, Belfast.
- James Grieve, Leading Linesman, South West Scotland Electricity Board (Johnstone, Renfrewshire.)
- Edgar James Hacker, Chief Inspector, Head Post Office, Birmingham.
- Samuel John Haley, Head-Gardener, North West European District, Imperial War Graves Commission.
- Alfred Hall, Experimental Assistant, Aladdin Industries Ltd., Greenford.
- John Wilcoxon Hallows, Signalman, Dunford, British Railways, Eastern Region, (Penistone, Yorkshire).
- Ernest Edward Hanney, Special Craftsman, Royal Mint, Melbourne, Australia.
- Sidney William Harper, Artificer, Technical Class, Grade III, Admiralty (Yiewsley, Middlesex.)
- Trevor Hayden Harper, Works Superintendent, Crosville Motor Services Ltd. (Handbridge, Chester.)
- William Ewart Harris, Senior Assistant General Instructor, Civil Defence Technical Training School, Taymouth Castile, Aberfeldy.
- Arthur Hawkesworth, Mains Foreman, London Electricity Board (Romford, Essex.)
- Thomas Helliwell, Foreman, W. H. Smith & Co., Manchester (Oldham.)
- George Henderson, Engineering Clerk of Works, Newcastle & Gateshead Water Co. (Newcastle)
- Sidney Hennen, Foreman Blacksmith, Camper & Nicholsons Ltd., Gosport.
- Ernest William Hill, Sub-Officer, Somerset Fire Brigade (Cheddar.)
- George Hill, Foreman, Bray Accessories Ltd., Leeds.
- Thomas Joseph Hill, Sack Storeman, Ministry of Food (Ely, Cambridgeshire.)
- Ronald Thomas Hodder, Plater, Marine Department, Southampton, British Railways (Netley, Hampshire.)
- Herbert Hoggard, Foreman-in-Charge, John Deheer Ltd., Bridlington (Beverley, Yorkshire)
- David Holmes, Chief Officer, Class I, HM Prison, Belfast.
- Percy Francis Hope, Warden, Washington Residential Training Centre, Durham Division, National Coal Board.
- Robert George Howard, Fields Research Engineer, Davey, Paxman & Co. Ltd., Colchester.
- Frederick Neville Howlett, Principal Workshop Foreman, 10 Command Workshop, REME, War Office (Brentwood, Essex.)
- Fred Isherwood, Toolroom Turner, Robert Stephenson & Hawthorns Ltd., Darlington.
- Ann Jenkins, Storewoman, Pembroke Depot, Swansea District, British Road Services (Pembroke.)
- Bennet Jepson, Depot Manager, Sheffield, House Coal Distribution (Emergency) Scheme.
- Frederick Johnson, Mechanical Engineering Superintendent, Southampton Corporation Waterworks (Twyford, Hampshire.)
- Evan Jones, Deputy, Groesfaen Colliery, South Western Division, National Coal Board (Rhymney, Monmouthshire.)
- Phillip Henry Jones, Mechanic Examiner, Inspectorate of Electrical & Mechanical Equipment, Ministry of Supply (Deptford, SE8.)
- Florence Jowett, Honorary Collector, St. Stephen's Church Savings Group, Grimsby.
- Robert Kemsley, Chargehand, W. G. Bagnall Ltd., Stafford.
- Harold Grimmitt Kendall, Head Foreman Fitter, Vickers-Armstrongs Ltd., Barrow-in Furness.
- Frederick James Kershaw, Supervising Instructor, Grade I, No. 2 School of Technical Training, RAF Cosford (Albrighton, Staffordshire.)
- David Knight, Assistant Foreman, Leith Harbour Commission (Edinburgh.)
- Richard George Frederick Knight, Driver, Southdown Motor Services Ltd. (Sidlesham, Sussex.)
- Gertrude Leach, Honorary Collector, Street Savings Group, Halifax.
- Robert Melton Leach, Senior Scientific Assistant, Royal Army Medical College (Beckenham, Kent.)
- George James Lindsay, Foreman, Pressed Steel Co. Ltd., Paisley.
- Evan Lodwick, Pumpsman and Salvage Man, Penrikyber Colliery, South Western Division, National Coal Board (Penrhiwceiber, Glamorganshire.)
- William Parkin Lowe, Coal Face Worker, Haig Colliery, Northern (Northumberland and Cumberland) Division, National Coal Board (Whitehaven, Cumberland.)
- Kathleen Mary Luraschi, Honorary Collector, Street Savings Group, Palmers Green, N.13.
- Thomas Lyon, Mains Foreman, Rotherham Undertaking, No.2 District (Rotherham), East Midlands Gas Board.
- Frederick Arthur McCallum, Dental Technician, RN Dental Service (Fareham, Hampshire.)
- William McCallum, Draughtsman, Glenfield & Kennedy Ltd., Kilmarnock.
- William Joseph McKean, School Staff Instructor, Uppingham School, Rutland.
- George MacLeay, Leading Fireman, Northern Area Fire Brigade, Bonar Bridge, Sutherland.
- James Normanton Madin, Sub-checkweighman, North Eastern Division, National Coal Board (Conisbrough, Yorkshire.)
- Margaret Helen Mair, Superintendent, Townsend Street Central Kitchen, LCC School Meals Service (Finsbury Park, N. 4.)
- Frank Mansell, Coppersmith, Guy Motors Ltd., Wolverhampton.
- Prudence Marshall, Weaver, Fielden Brothers Ltd., Todmorden, Lancashire.
- Charles William Mellor, Driver, North Western Road Car Co., Macclesfield.
- Edward Meyers, Attack Teacher Assistant, Admiralty (Gosport.)
- Edwin Moody, Foreman Fitter, Rose Brothers (Gainsborough) Ltd., Gainsborough, Lincolnshire.
- George William Moore, Pattern Shop Supervisor, Millspaugh Ltd., Sheffield.
- Charles Frederick Morris, Inspector, City of London Special Constabulary (Hampstead, NW.3.)
- Joseph Morris, Chief Storekeeper, Establishments and Organisation Division, Ministry of Supply (Hounslow, Middlesex.)
- William Frederick Morter, Research and Experimental Mechanic (Special), Department of Atomic Energy (Newbury, Berkshire.)
- Percy Moyes, Assistant Clerk of Works, J & E Hall Ltd., Dartford.
- Edward Nunn, Inspector, Transport Services, London Postal Region (Bromley, Kent.)
- Patrick O'Kane, Foreman, Ioco Ltd., Glasgow.
- William Stobart Ord, Inspector, Northumberland Constabulary (Harrogate.)
- Robert Paterson, Head Charge Hand, W. & J. Martin Ltd. (Giffnock, Renfrewshire.)
- John Patience, Head Gardener, French District, Imperial War Graves Commission.
- Anne Peel, Honorary Collector, Billinge Road Savings Group and Tunstall Lane Savings Group, Wigan.
- Winston Pemberton, Jointer, North Western Electricity Board (Oldham.)
- Harry Phillips, Foreman Meat Porter, Wholesale Meat Supply Association Depot, Wolverhampton (Willenhall, Staffordshire.)
- Edward Charles Porter, Established Painter, Civil Engineer-in-Chiefs Department, Admiralty (Southsea.)
- John William Porter, Storekeeper, Grade IV, Ministry of Agriculture & Fisheries (Nottingham.)
- Charles Potter, Coal Face Developer, Frances Colliery, Scottish Division, National Coal Board (Kirkcaldy.)
- Frank Edwin Thomas Powell, Technical Officer, Tunbridge Wells Telephone Area (Tonbridge, Kent.)
- Frederick Harold Powell, Postman, Higher Grade, Head Post Office, Wolverhampton.
- Arthur Noel Powis, Repair Manager, J. A. Mulhern & Co. Ltd. Liverpool.
- David Prentice, Repairer, Blackrigg Colliery, Scottish Division, National Coal Board (Armadale, West Lothian.)
- Thomas Price, Station Officer, HM Coastguard, Stornoway, Isle of Lewis.
- Alfred Prince, Coal Face Worker, Ledston Luck Colliery, North Eastern Division, National Coal Board (Kippax, near Leeds.)
- Samuel Pugh, Senior Foreman, Ambrose Shardlow & Co. Ltd., Sheffield.
- James Rae, Principal, Lightkeeper, Mull of Galloway Lighthouse, Northern Lighthouse Board.
- Anne Patricia Read, Assistant Regional Clothing Officer, London, Women's Voluntary Services (Effingham, Surrey.)
- Robert Redfearn, Auxiliary Postman, Forest-in-Teesdale Post Office, Barnard Castle, County Durham.
- Cyril John Samuel Way Reeve, Inspector of Fitters, Admiralty (Gillingham, Kent.)
- David Reid, Master, Haisbro' Light Vessel, Corporation of Trinity House (Gorlestonvon-Sea, Norfolk.)
- David John Richards, Colliery Traffic Weigher, Tymawr Colliery, South Western Division, National Coal Board (Treforest, Glamorganshire.)
- Leonard Percival Richards, Chief Supervisor, Post Office Telephone Exchange, Cardiff.
- Harold Arthur Ridge, District Superintendent, Longton (Stoke-on-Trent District), West Midlands Gas Board.
- John Wrae Rigg, Mechanical Transport Officer (Grade 3), London Airport, Ministry of Transport & Civil Aviation (Hayes, Middlesex.)
- George Robinson, Mechanic, National Physical Laboratory (Hampton, Middlesex.)
- William Robinson, Progressman (Technical), Torpedo Experimental Establishment, Admiralty (Greenock.)
- Thomas Jacob Rothwell, Head Constable, Royal Ulster Constabulary (Belfast.)
- James William Rowland, Senior Paper Keeper, HM Stationery Office (Sutton, Surrey.)
- Leonard Rudd, Export Packer and Maintenance Man, Celluware Ltd. (Newcastle upon Tyne.)
- George Rue, Master Repairer, Dillwyn Colliery, South Western Division, National Coal Board (Crynant, Glamorganshire.)
- Stanley Edward Bentley Russell, Printing Overseer, Grade II, Savings Department, General Post Office (Wealdstone, Middlesex)
- William Ryan, Foreman Joiner, Williams, Harvey & Co. Ltd. (Litherland, Lancashire.)
- Newark Robson Sainthouse, General Foreman, John Laing & Sons Ltd. (Edgware, Middlesex.)
- Charles Salter, Donkeyman-Greaser, SS Paparoa, New Zealand Shipping Co. Ltd. (East Ham, E.6.)
- Harold Scaife, Installation Inspector, North Eastern Electricity Board (Scarborough)
- Frank Thomas Scott, Sewage Plant Attendant, Broadmoor Institution. (Sandhurst, Berkshire.)
- Walter Pickersgill Sever, Chief Inspector, Head Post Office, Bradford.
- James Harry Sheppard, Chief Instructor, Government Training Centre, Ministry of Labour & National Service, Birmingham.
- Eva Shilling, Honorary Collector, Street Savings Group, Ashford, Kent.
- John Edward Simmonds, Exhauster Driver, Stratford Works, North Thames Gas Board (Ilford, Essex.)
- Thomas Henry Singleton, Quay Superintendent, Liverpool Port Dried Fruits Office (Liverpool.)
- Arthur Smith, Underground Belt Turner, Orgreave Colliery, North Eastern Division, National Coal Board (Sheffield.)
- Frank Herbert Smith, Superintendent of Stores, No. 25 Maintenance Unit, Royal Air Force, Hartlebury.
- John Squires, Ripper, Yorkshire Main Colliery, North Eastern Division, National Coal Board (Edlington, near Doncaster.)
- Harold Lewis Staddon, Chargehand Carpenter, Royal Air Force, Halton (Wendover, Buckinghamshire.)
- John Henry Stephens, Grade I Welder, Unit Superheater & Pipe Co. Ltd., Swansea.
- John Stone, Underground Road Repairer, Denby Hall Colliery, East Midlands Division, National Coal Board (Heage, Derbyshire.)
- Henry Charles Stuart, Foreman, East Kent Road Car Co. Ltd. (Canterbury.)
- Frederick John Sweeting, Senior Bailiff, Lambeth County Court (Wandsworth, SW.18.)
- Ronald Talbot, Plumber, War Department, Caribbean Area.
- Sayid Talib, Motor Transport Driver, Grade I, RAF Habbaniya.
- Charles Henry Taylor, Shop Foreman, No. 20 Maintenance Unit, Royal Air Force, Aston Down (Cirencester.)
- James Timmins, Foreman, Alloa Glass Works Co. Ltd., Alloa.
- Emily Louise Violet Tuckett, Assistant Supervisor, Cabinet Office Telephone Exchange, General Post Office (Tooting, SW.17.)
- Alfred Turner, Slaughtering Demonstrator, Ministry of Food (Aldershot.)
- Dorothy Mary Twyman, Supervisor of Telephone Operators, Navy, Army, & Air Force Institutes (Fulham, SW.6.)
- Percy Unsworth, Technician, Class I, Head Post Office, Bolton.
- Charles Van Den Bergh, Head Messenger, British Consulate-General, Antwerp.
- Albert Edward Walker, Head Forester, Forest of Dean, Forestry Commission (Coleford, Gloucestershire.)
- Charles Henry Walker, Joiner, Chesterfield Undertaking, East Midlands Gas Board (Chesterfield.)
- Cyril Walker, Foreman Electrician, Cabot Carbon Ltd., Ellesmere Port, Cheshire.
- Thomas Edward Walker, Boatswain, SS British Scientist, British Tanker Co. Ltd. (Copthorne, Sussex.)
- Horatio Wallett, Mains Inspector, Bilston District, West Midlands Gas Board (Coseley, Staffordshire.)
- John Warren, Foreman Mechanic (Underground), Hem Heath Colliery, West Midlands Division, National Coal Board (Stoke-on-Trent.)
- Edward Watson, Belt Cleaner (Underground), Babbington Colliery, East Midlands Division, National Coal Board (Bulwell, Nottingham.)
- Thomas Watson, Instrument Maker, Radar Research Establishment, Ministry of Supply, Malvern.
- Thomas Williams Watts, Commandant, Pembrokeshire Special Constabulary (Haverfordwest.)
- Davies Thomas Wilkinson, Works Foreman, Meltham Silica Firebrick Co. Ltd., Meltham.
- Charles Williams, Foreman, Gloucester Railway Carriage & Wagon Co. Ltd., Gloucester.
- Frederick George Williams, Office Keeper, Grade II, Ministry of Labour & National Service (Harrow, Middlesex.)
- Gordon Stuart Williams, Postman, Head Post Office, Cardiff.
- Hope Williams, Centre Organiser, Tarvin Rural District, Cheshire, Women's Voluntary Services (Kelsall, Chester.)
- Edwin John Winkworth, Leading Turbine Driver, Southern Division, British Electricity Authority (Reading)
- Frank Womersley, Foreman, Maintenance Fitter, Steetley Magnesite Co. (Hartlepool.)
- Mary Beatrice Woodhead, Assistant County Organiser, Derbyshire, Women's Voluntary Services (Chesterfield.)
- Arthur Wright, Leading Stoker, Stoke Power Station, Midlands Division, British Electricity Authority (Hanley, Staffordshire.)

State of South Australia

- Roy Robert Elliott, Constable, Traffic Control Section of the Traffic Division, South Australia Police Force.

Southern Rhodesia

- Walter James Stone, lately Inspector, British South Africa Police Reserve.

Colonial Empire

- Jonah Francis Greenidge, Bailiff, Supreme Court, Bahamas.
- Alice Scott, Private Nurse, Bermuda.
- Haralambosi Papageorghiou Karakannas, Inspector of Water Supplies, Water Supply and Irrigation Department, Cyprus.
- Eileen Hazel Hockley, Telephone Supervisor, East African Posts & Telegraphs.
- Dulcie Arnold, Health Nurse, Infant Welfare Clinic, Seremban, Federation of Malaya.
- Nagamuthu Chelliah, Chief Clerk, Police Clerical Service, Federation of Malaya.
- Chua Seng Kooi, Chinese Liaison Officer, Muar District, Federation of Malaya.
- Hasnah binte Abdul Manap, Social Welfare Assistant, Muar, Federation of Malaya.
- Charles Ellice Hermon, Technical Assistant, Revenue Survey Office, Malacca, Federation of Malaya.
- Nagamuthu Kandiah, Technical Assistant, Telecommunications Department, Johore, Federation of Malaya.
- Segamany Maruthamuthu, Police Clerk and Interpreter, Segamat, Federation of Malaya.
- Haji Min bin Haji Ahmad, Junior Agricultural Officer, Federation of Malaya.
- James Michael Scully, lately Chief Clerk, District Office, Bukit Mertajam, Federation of Malaya.
- Tan Khay Tiong, Manager, Hock Seng Teck Sawmill, Kota Tinggi, Federation of Malaya.
- Sabapathy Pillay Tatparanandam, Commercial Licensing Assistant, Road Transport Department, Federation of Malaya.
- Kanagasaby Thilliampalam, lately Service Clerk, General Clerical Service, Director of Forestry's Office, Federation of Malaya.
- Joseph Awotwi Dadzie, Foreman, Public Works Department, Gold Coast.
- Zena Eliza Lopez, Sister, Kingston Public Hospital, Jamaica.
- Kinyanjui s/o Thigo, lately Interpreter, City African Affairs Department, Nairobi, Kenya.
- Muntu Rindari Muntu Mukira, Inspector of Police, Kenya.
- Iris Blanche Dickson, Head Operator, Antigua Telephone Service, Leeward Islands.
- Umoru Falwal, Chief of Police, Bida Native Administration, Nigeria.
- Olawale Martins, 1st Class Clerk, Survey Department, Nigeria.
- Aaron Mwenya, Clerk to Native Courts Adviser, Northern Rhodesia.
- William Benjamin Lewis, Forest Surveyor, Forest Department, Sierra Leone.
- Silas Sitai, Administrative Assistant, British Solomon Islands Protectorate.
- Haji Jama Ali. For public services in Erigavo, Somaliland.
- Saleh Farah, Sergeant-Major, Burao Illalo (Tribal Police) Force, Somaliland.
- Morton Kumwenda, Medical Assistant, Junior Service, General Division, Tanganyika.
- Shabani s/o Mtengeti, Clerk, Junior Service, Tanganyika.
- Leslie Beckles, Senior Mechanic, Customs & Excise Department, Trinidad.
- James Alexander Belgrave, Club Leader, Castries Boys Club, St. Lucia, Windward Islands.
- Khalfan Said, Sailmaker, Port and Marine Department, Zanzibar.

=== Royal Victorian Medal (RVM) ===
Gold

- James Edward Emmerson.

Silver

- Chief Petty Officer Charles Edwin Henry Breach, P/JX.125472.
- Chief Joiner Frederick Charles Nichols, P/MX.46201.
- Montague Sergy, Charles Alfred Smith.
- Maurice Ransome Watts.
- William Alfred Wigley.

=== Royal Red Cross (RRC) ===
- Lieutenant-Colonel (temporary) Helen Mary Grant (206172), Queen Alexandra's Royal Army Nursing Corps.
- Major Mary Ethel Holmes (206214), Queen Alexandra's Royal Army Nursing Corps.

Additional

- Lieutenant-Colonel Beatrice Louise Ferrier, ARRC (206146), Queen Alexandra's Royal Army Nursing Corps.

==== Associate of the Royal Red Cross (ARRC) ====
- Mary Potter, SuperintendingSister, Queen Alexandra's Royal Naval Nursing Service.
- Bridget Quill, SeniorNursing Sister, Queen Alexandra's Royal Naval Nursing Service.
- Major Marily Fabien (208121), Queen Alexandra's Royal Army Nursing Corps.
- Major Barbara Masson Gordon (206176), Queen Alexandra's Royal Army Nursing Corps.
- Wing Officer Adairine Mary Tisdall (405063), Princess Mary's Royal Air Force Nursing Service.
- Squadron Officer Elinor Margaret Wright (405099), Princess Mary's Royal Air Force Nursing Service.

=== Air Force Cross (AFC) ===
- Acting Group Captain Henry Niel George Wheeler, DSO, OBE:, DFC.

Wing Commanders

- John Watson Allan, DSO, DFC (89617).
- Hubert Neville Garbett, DFC (33386).
- Duncan Frank Hyland-Smith, DjfC (40759).

Acting Wing Commander.

- Patrick Peter Colin Barthropp, DFC (41542).

Squadron Leaders

- Maechel Anthony Ensor, DSO, DFC (59073).
- Basil Robert William Forster, DjfC. (124611).
- Derek Jack Furner, DFC (127259).
- Winston Herbert Kellaway, DSO (49688).
- John Harding Lewis (101513).
- Basil Goodhand Lock (152854).
- Gordon Leonard Mattey, DFC (81042).
- William John Peter Straker (131041).

Acting Squadron Leaders

- Harry George Currell, DFC (153944).
- Bevis Deraton Davies (128846).
- Edward John Eames (159394), Royal Air OForce.

Flight Lieutenants

- George Allan, MC (59703).
- David Henry Blomeley, DFC (40665).
- Hannan Bushen (124454).
- Peter William Carr (1629775).
- Frank Hugh Philip Cattle (58125).
- Norman Chamberlain (607008).
- Desmond Lionel Edmonds (178295).
- William Edwards (58759).
- William Henry Evans, DFC (188950).
- Terence Michael Fennell (576575).
- Alfred Arthur Francis (178299).
- Robert MacAlastair Furze (607012).
- Scott Riuncdman Garden (55592).
- William James Glenn, DFM (50746).
- Walter Stanley Green (57678).
- Jack Harry Liversidge (150493).
- Walter George Myatt (191909).
- Geoffrey Raper (525318).
- Anthony William Ringer (190709).
- Robin Anderson Slater, DFC (151830).
- Colin Hannington Sloan (58565).
- Lionel Christopher Spargo (196249).
- William Robert Sparkes (176920).
- Arthur George Steele (151923).
- Leslie Albert Titmuss, DFC (177528).
- Vlastimil Vesely, DFC (83234).
- Michael George Eugene Williams (199316).

Flying Officers

- Edwin Albert Ambrose (3204102).
- John Bartrum (1609256).
- Michael Francis Hilary Dobson (1805464).
- Donald William Greenslade (1865893).
- Idris Jones (58602).

Master Pilots

- Kazimierz Artymuik, DFM (783224).
- Albert Victor Potter (657946).
- Harry George White (526160).

Lieutenant Commander

- Peter Melville Lamb, DSC, Royal Navy.

==== Bar to Air Force Cross ====
Wing Commander

- Ernest William Tacon, DSO, MVO, DFC, AFC (31696).

Squadron Leaders

- John Crampton, DFC, AFC (131910).
- Gordon Douglas Cremer, AFC (122939).
- Rex Southern Sanders, DFC, AFC (135043).
- Ernest Harry Turner, AFC (52027).

Acting Squadron Leader

- Francis Michael Hegarty, AFC (164406).

=== Air Force Medal (AFM) ===
Flight Sergeants

- 1237648 William James Aitchison.
- 1587259 Robert Edward Anstee.
- 1358087 Geoffrey Crossley.
- 1318872 William Henry Harris.
- 1494629 George Edwin Ridley Kelly.
- 1322449 Frederick John Loveridge.
- 1344040 James Ferns McCorkle.
- 1582812 Derek Oldham.
- 1482477 Norman Levi Park.
- 1609386 Dennis George Rance.
- 4015091 Raymond Harold Stead.
- 1602361 William Carpenter Todd.
- 1437404 John Anthony Trigg.

Sergeants

- 1584704 Edward Heslop.
- 3034141 George Thomas Lovett.

==== Bar to Air Force Medal ====
Flight Sergeant

- 578390 Gordon Acklam, AFM.

=== Queen's Commendation for Valuable Service in the Air ===
- Walter Lansdowne Bennett, Fleet Engineer Officer, Comet Fleet, British Overseas Airways Corporation.
- Captain Peter Edward Bressey, Senior Captain, Second Class, British European Airways Corporation.
- Captain Athelstan Sigfried Mellersh Rendall, Flight Superintendent, Britannia Fleet, British Overseas Airways Corporation.

Wing Commander

- James Henry Iremonger, DFC (33342).

Squadron Leaders

- Dean Wendell Jones, DFC (111542).
- John William James Leggett (150341).
- Ian Hector Mercer, LMSSA (202607).
- George Frederick Turner, DFC (125593).
- Acting Squadron Leader Cyril George Lewis (55132).

Flight Lieutenants

- Joseph Donald Baker (58951).
- Allan Bountiff (1605345).
- John Goodwin Burns (3039497).
- John Nigel Carpenter (3110148).
- John Curd (46848).
- Seymour Evans (1320990).
- Frank Garside (122492).
- John Wilson Harper, DFC (141737).
- Michael Edward Hobson (58309).
- David Daniel James (193513), Royal Air Force Reserve of Officers.
- Robert Edward Jefferies (1581445).
- John William Kilburn (56496).
- Brunon Jerzy Kudrewicz (501903).
- Charles George Lawrence (124734).
- Jack Houghton Leyland (153045).
- Lachlan MacKinnon, DSC (501655).
- Peter Douglas Menzies (198414).
- Ernest Frederick Pennie, DFM (189180).
- John Edward Pollington (1398448).
- Gordon Powell (55181).
- Joseph Archibald Donald Rice (741422).
- Duncan Matthew Stevenson (500962).
- Reginald Douglas Topley (185815).
- Michael Alwyn Vickers (204669).
- Anthony Sydney Ware (54538).
- Gordon Wrigley (116449).

Flying Officer

- Paul Wilson (2491620).

Master Pilots

- Victor John Bryant (657347).
- Kenneth Russell Hayward (619218).
- Kenneth Johnstone (780906).
- Edwin Malin (781256).
- Adam Pieniazek (780699).

Flight Sergeants

- 1850082 Arthur Halliday Elliot.
- 3127399 Graham Neil Franklin.
- 1232214 Charles Vincent Cyril Lacey.
- 1604985 William James Ryall.
- 546053 John Williamson Smallfield, BEM.
- 2200042 Eric Arthur Smith.

Sergeants

- 4031509 John Patrick Holland.
- 1584783 Ronald Redfern.

Acting Sergeant

- 1488987 John Ronald Erskine.

=== Queen's Police Medal ===
England and Wales

- Lieutenant-Colonel Harold Arthur Golden, OBE, Chief Constable, Wiltshire Constabulary.
- Thomas Beasley Humphrey, OBE, Chief Constable, South Shields Borough Police Force.
- George Henry Cook, OBE, Chief Constable, Sunderland Borough Police Force.
- Reginald Rowland, Assistant Chief Constable, Cornwall County Constabulary.
- Harold Nelson Back, MBE, Assistant Chief Constable, Surrey Constabulary.
- William Benjamin Rawlings, OBE, MC, Deputy Commander, Metropolitan Police.
- Frank William Kitchener, Chief Superintendent, Bedfordshire Constabulary.
- Wilfred Arthur Beard, Superintendent, Isle of Ely Constabulary.
- Owen Jones, Superintendent, Denbighshire Constabulary.
- Sophie Alloway, Superintendent (Grade1), MetropolitanPolice.

Scotland

- Alexander McCombie, Superintendent and Deputy Chief Constable, Scottish North Eastern Counties Constabulary.
- Robert King, Superintendent, City of Glasgow Police Force.

Northern Ireland

- Jacob Frederick Martin, Head Constable, Royal Ulster Constabulary.

Australia

- John Joshua Turnbull, Inspector, First Class, South Australia Police Force.

Colonies, Protectorates, Protected states and trust Territories.

- Robert John Wyndham Verrall, MVO, Commissioner of Police, Bahamas.
- Harold John Woolnough, Superintendent of Police, Head, Special Branch, Malacca, Federation of Malaya.
- Conrad Swire Kerr Bovell, Assistant Commissioner of Police, Chief Police Officer, Pahang, Federation of Malaya.
- John Timmmerman, Assistant Commissioner of Police, Kenya.
- Allan Charles Chiappini Peebles, Commissioner of Police, Northern Region, Nigeria.
- Edwyn Sandys Sherwood, Deputy Commissioner of Police, Nigeria.
- Charles Hugh Fairfax Apthorp, MVO, Commissioner of Police, Nyasaland.
- Nigel Godfrey Morris, Commissioner of Police, Singapore.
- Michael John Macoun, Assistant Commissioner of Police, Tanganyika.

=== Queen's Fire Service Medal ===
England and Wales

- Joseph Whiteside, MBE, Assistant Chief Officer, Manchester Fire Brigade.
- Eric Searston, Chief Officer, East Riding of Yorkshire Fire Brigade.
- Joseph Holt, Chief Officer, Wallasey Fire Brigade.
- Harry Sidney Charles Tanner, Chief Officer, Warwickshire Fire Brigade.

Scotland

- Robert Bowman, OBE, Firemaster, Western Area Fire Brigade.

Colonies

- William James Gorman, BEM, Chief Officer, Fire Brigade, Hong Kong.

=== Colonial Police Medal ===
Southern Rhodesia

- Machado, First Class Sergeant, British South Africa Police.
- Major Ernest Stanley Streeter, British South Africa Police.
- Lieutenant-Colonel Basil Gordon Spurling, British South Africa Police.
- Douglas Ponting Willshire, Chief Inspector, British South Africa Police.

Bechuanaland

- Captain Geoffrey Walter Taylor, Superintendent, Bechuanaland Protectorate Police.

Colonial Empire

- Mangal Singh Ahlwalia, Assistant District, Commandant, Kenya Police Reserve.
- AJi Ahmed, Inspector, Brunei Police Force.
- Alwi bin Mohamed Yusof, Sub-Inspector, Federation of Malaya Police Force.
- Mohamed Amin bin Mohamed Jamil, Assistant Superintendent, Singapore Police Force.
- Mohamed Aslam, Assistant District Commandant, Kenya Police Reserve.
- Abdul Aziz bin Mahmood, Inspector, Singapore Police Force.
- Baba bin Mordin, Staff Sergeant, Singapore Police Force.
- Merwin Leon Barrow, Sub-Inspector, British Guiana Police Force.
- Colonel Edward Brymer Belcher, MC, District Commandant, Kenya Police Reserve.
- Harvey Samuel Brookes, Sergeant, Leeward Islands Police Force.
- Leslie Harold Brown, Senior Superintendent, Nigeria Police Force.
- Neill Brown, Assistant Superintendent, Uganda Police Force.
- Choo Kok Weng, Assistant Superintendent, Federation of Malaya Police Force.
- Alexander Fearn Cochrane, Chief Inspector, Hong Kong Police Force.
- James Patrick Cooper, Assistant District Commandant, Kenya Police Reserve.
- Noel Alfred Crosswell, Superintendent, Jamaica Constabulary.
- Hugh Blackburn Jervoise Donaldson, Superintendent, Federation of Malaya Police Force.
- Richard Harold Francis England, Senior Superintendent, Nigeria Police Force.
- Ronald Edgar Fellows, Assistant District Commandant, Kenya Police Reserve.
- Samuel Morrison Ferguson, Senior Assistant Superintendent, Gold Coast Police Force.
- Francis Folabit, Sub-Inspector, Nigeria Police Force.
- Joseph Fominyen, Inspector, Nigeria Police Force.
- Major-General Charles Christopher Fowkes, CBE, DSO, MC, Inspector General, Kenya Police Reserve.
- Courtenay Giles Bartholomew Gidley, Senior Superintendent, Nigeria Police Force.
- Arthur Llewelyn Griffith, Superintendent, Kenya Police Force.
- Joseph Griffith, Superintendent, British Guiana Police Force.
- Harry Halstead, Superintendent, Fiji Police Force.
- Douglas Bertram Davenant Henchman, Acting Assistant Commissioner, Federation of Malaya Police.
- John Thomas Hodgkinson, Superintendent, Kenya Police Force.
- Dennis William Humphrey, Senior Superintendent, Northern Rhodesia Police Force.
- Alexis Ioannou, Assistant Superintendent, Cyprus Police Force.
- Abdul Kadir bin Abu Samah, Sergeant, Special Constabulary, Federation, of Malaya.
- Haji Abdul Kadir bin Haji Hassan, Sub Inspector, Singapore Police Force.
- Kiber arap Chelimo, Sergeant, Kenya Police Force.
- Alois Kojo s/o Madote, Assistant District Commandant, Kenya Police Reserve.
- Kwan Fook Nam, Assistant Superintendent, Federation of Malaya Police Force.
- Ngah Lamat bin Pandakmat Ali, Sergeant Major, Federation of Malaya Police Force.
- Lee Kooi Yin, Woman Searcher, Special Constabulary, Federation of Malaya.
- Thomas Paterson McBrierley, Superintendent, Kenya Police Force.
- Manikam s/o Muniandy, Corporal, Special Constabulary, Federation of Malaya.
- John Metcalfe Mason, Commandant, Volunteer Special Constabulary, Singapore.
- Robert Key Masson, MBE, Superintendent, Belize Fire Brigade, British Honduras.
- Clement Matacheta, Sub-Inspector, Nyasaland Police Force.
- Henry Robert Middleton, Assistant Superintendent, Federation of Malaya Police Force.
- Raja Mohamed bin Raja Ismail, Honorary Inspector, Police Volunteer Reserve, Federation of Malaya.
- Tinuaga Moshie, Sergeant, Gold Coast Police Force.
- Sumba Mugamba, Sergeant, Kenya Police Force.
- Raphael Nganje, Sergeant, Nigeria Police Force.
- Desmond Victor Noott, Superintendent, Sierra Leone Police Force.
- Isaac Yemote Odoi, Sub-Inspector, Gold Coast Police Force.
- Emile Philippe Benjamin Ohsan, Bandmaster, Mauritius Police Force.
- Emmanuel Olawaiye, Sub-Inspector, Nigeria Police Force.
- Thomas Robinson Pallett, Senior Superintendent, Nigeria Police Force.
- Richard Hugh Gwynne Prettejohn, Senior Reserve Police Officer, Kenya Police Reserve.
- James Porter Reid, Superintendent, Trinidad Police Force.
- Douglas Stewart Ross, Assistant Superintendent, Federation of Malaya Police Force.
- Abdul Samad bin Lahadi, Corporal, Special Constabulary, Federation of Malaya.
- Fore Samura, Sergeant-Major, Court Messenger Force, Sierra Leone.
- Shahbudin bin Ibrahim, Acting Company Serjeant Major, Federation of Malaya Police Force.
- Francis William Matheson Sharman, MC, Deputy Superintendent, Federation of Malaya Police Force.
- Ujagar Singh s/o Karam Singh, Detective Corporal, Federation of Malaya Police Force.
- Victor Thomas Smithyman, Superintendent, Nyasaland Police Force.
- Alfred John Broomhall Temple, Deputy Commissioner, Somaliland Police Force.
- Joseph Peter Tham, Commandant, Special Constabulary, Singapore.
- Sydney George Thompson, Assistant Superintendent, Kenya Police Force.
- Frederick Clive Somerville Tillbrook, ED, Acting Assistant Commissioner, Federation of Malaya Police Force.
- Leonard William Whymark, Superintendent, Cyprus Police Force.

== Australia ==
=== Knight Bachelor ===
- Alexander Paterson Murphy, MC, MD, ChM, President of the Royal Australasian College of Physicians.
- Ian Clunies Ross, CMG, Chairman of the Scientific and Industrial Research Organisation in the Commonwealth of Australia.
- Herbert Henry Schlink, MB, ChM, of Sydney, a distinguished Surgeon.
- The Honourable John Soundy, CBE, MLC, of Hobart, Tasmania. For public services.
- Arthur George Stephenson, CMG, MC, of Melbourne. For services to Architecture.
- Captain Patrick Gordon Taylor, GC, MC, of Sydney. For services to Civil Aviation.
- Alan Stewart Watt, CBE, Australian Commissioner in Malaya.

=== Order of the Bath ===
==== Companion of the Order of the Bath (CB) ====
Military Division

- Lieutenant-General (temporary) Henry Wells, CBE, DSO (3/27), Australian Staff Corps.

=== Order of Saint Michael and Saint George ===
==== Knight Grand Cross of the Order of St Michael and St George (GCMG) ====
- The Right Honourable Sir Owen Dixon, KCMG, Chief Justice of the High Court of the Commonwealth of Australia.

==== Companion of the Order of St Michael and St George (CMG) ====
- The Most Reverend Joseph John Booth, MC, Archbishop of Melbourne.
- The Most Reverend James Duhig, Roman Catholic Archbishop of Brisbane.
- Kenneth George Luke, of Melbourne. For services to Commerce and to philanthropic organisations.
- John Spencer Nall, of Geelong. For services to the community.

=== Order of the British Empire ===
==== Knight Commander of the Order of the British Empire (KBE) ====
- The Honourable Sir William Flood Webb, Justice of the High Court of the Commonwealth of Australia.
- The Honourable Dudley Williams, MC, Justice of the High Court of the Commonwealth of Australia.

==== Commander of the Order of the British Empire (CBE) ====
Military Division

Army

- Brigadier Hector McDonald Finnie, OBE, ED (2/163414), Royal Australian Army Dental Corps.
- Brigadier Albert Harold Hellstrom (3/25), Royal Australian Army Ordnance Corps.

In recognition of services in Korea during the period 28 July 1953 to 31 January 1954.

- Brigadier (temporary) John Gordon Noel Wilton, DSO, OBE, (2/16), Australian Staff Corps.

Royal Australian Air Force

- Group Captain Colin Thomas Hannah, OBE.

Civil Division

- Francis Eric Hitchins, OBE, of Cranbrook, Western Australia. For services to primary industries.
- Charles Washburne Joyce, of Kew, Victoria. For services to ex-servicemen.
- Professor Leslie Harold Martin, of Camberwell, Victoria. For services to Science.
- Arthur John Metcalfe, MB, ChM, Director-General of Health and Director of Quarantine.
- Lieutenant-Colonel Charles Joseph Alfred Moses, General Manager, Australian Broadcasting Commission.
- Peter Belmont Newcomen, of Box Hill, Victoria. For services to primary production.
- Harold George Raggatt, Secretary of the Department of National Development, Canberra.
- Tom Cleave Stott, MHA, of Plympton, South Australia. For services to the wheat industry.

==== Officer of the Order of the British Empire (OBE) ====
Military Division

Royal Australian Navy

- Commander Lindsay Gellatly, DSC.
- Acting Captain Stanley Herbert King Spurgeon, DSO.

Army

- Lieutenant-Colonel Frank Downs d'Archy (2/50665), Royal Australian Army Service Corps.
- Colonel (temporary) George Percy Hunt, MBE (3/98), Australian Staff Corps.
- Lieutenant-Colonel John William Lawson (1/7524), Royal Australian Army Ordnance Corps.
- Lieutenant-Colonel Heinrich Lawrence Charles Martins (3/152), Royal Corps of Australian Electrical and Mechanical Engineers.

Royal Australian Air Force

- Group Captain Ernest Hey.
- Group Captain William Darcy Mason.

Civil Division

- The Reverend Frank William Boreham, of Kew, Victoria, a prominent preacher and author.
- Stanley Roy Carver, Acting Commonwealth Statistician.
- David Brendon Doyle, of Brighton, Victoria. For services to the building industry.
- Roland Alistair House Foster, of Sydney. For services to Music.
- Mabel Eileen Furley, JP, of Mosman. For social welfare services.
- Herbert John Goodes, Assistant Secretary, Commonwealth Treasury, Canberra.
- Ivor Henry Thomas Hele, of Aldinga, a distinguished Artist.
- Violet Muriel Herring, of Ascot, Queensland. For services to the Red Cross.
- Councillor Albert Mainerd, of Bexley, New South Wales. For services to Local Government in Australia.
- Nora Minnie McKid, Matron of the Kyogle Memorial Hospital.
- Harold Clive Newman, Assistant Secretary, Defence Division of the Commonwealth Treasury, Melbourne.
- Ada May Norris, of Camberwell, Victoria. For social welfare services.
- James Lampard Paton, of Peppermint Grove, Western Australia. For public services.
- Vernon Seymour Ransford, a former international cricketer, now Secretary of the Melbourne Cricket club.
- Frank Leslie Stillwell, formerly Officer-in-Charge of the Mineragraphic Section, Commonwealth Scientific and Industrial Research Organisation.
- James Arnold Whittle, of Lower Mitcham, South Australia. For services to blinded ex-servicemen.

==== Member of the Order of the British Empire (MBE) ====
Military Division

Royal Australian Navy

- Senior Commissioned Gunner Michael John Duffy.
- Lieutenant-Commander Francis Benjamin Glynn, VRD, RANVR.

Army

- Major Edward Henry Colley (4/32751), Royal Corps of Australian Electrical and Mechanical Engineers.
- Major (temporary) Tom Wooton Elliott (1/28211), Royal Australian Infantry Corps.
- Major (Quartermaster) Jack Michael Goold (4/8), Royal Australian Army Medical Corps.
- Lieutenant (Quartermaster) (Honorary Captain) John Cecil Hoar (3/265), late Royal Corps of Australian Electrical and Mechanical Engineers.
- Captain Robert Cecil Loder (5/21459), Royal Australian Infantry Corps.
- 3/545 Warrant Officer Class I Lionel Douglas Haig McCombe, Royal Australian Infantry Corps.
- 2/738 Warrant Officer Class I (temporary) John William Simpson, Royal Australian Artillery.

In recognition of services in Korea during the period 28 July 1953 to 31 January 1954.

- 1/205 Warrant Officer Class II Arthur Humphris, The Royal Australian Regiment.

Royal Australian Air Force

- Squadron Leader William Frederick James Palmer (03224).
- Warrant Officer Maurice Roy Selke (A.3641).
- Warrant Officer Thomas Guildstern Ullrich (A.31254).

Additional Member

In recognition of non-operational services in Japan in connection with operations in Korea during the period 28 July 1953 to 31 January 1954.

- Flight Lieutenant Kenneth McCullough (03498), Royal Australian Air Force.

Civil Division

- John Barry, Assistant Commonwealth Statistician, Canberra.
- Isabel Katherine Brown, of Toronto, New South Wales. For services to the Red Cross.
- William Chambers, of Longueville, New South Wales. For services to the shipping industry.
- Ida Cohen, JP, of Tamworth, New South Wales. For services to the Red Cross.
- Colonel Edwin Theyer Dean, DSO, VD, of Moculta, South Australia. For public services.
- Kathleen Norah Dennis, of Greenwich, New South Wales. For social welfare services.
- Mona Gwendoline Fitz-Gerald, of Enoggera, Queensland. For organising food gifts for ex-service personnel in the United Kingdom.
- Isabella Flack, of Hay, New South Wales. For social welfare services.
- Olive Victoria Gray, JP, of Malvern, Victoria. For social welfare services especially on behalf of children.
- Clarice Lilian Greenhill, Secretary to the Australian Consul-General in New York.
- Matthew Harrison, JP, of Camberwell, Victoria. For services to ex-service personnel.
- Councillor John Charles Hogan, JP, of Mont Albert, Victoria. For services to Local Government in Australia.
- Nellie Grace Ibbott, of Mornington, Victoria. For services to Local Government and charitable organisations in Australia.
- Stuart Charles James, of Annerley, Queensland. For services to ex-service personnel, especially those suffering from tuberculosis.
- William Henry Knight, Assistant Transport Officer, Department of the Interior, Canberra.
- Mabel Louise Lavan, Officer-in-charge of the Cable Section, Australian High Commissioner's Office, London.
- Edward Lionel Birch Leeson, of Kew, Victoria. For social welfare work, especially on behalf of distressed and destitute persons.
- Dorothy Lena Leggett, of Cooper's Plains, Queensland. For social welfare services.
- Councillor Harold Charles Matheson, JP, of Kurrajong, New South Wales. For services to Local Government in Australia.
- Allan Foster McConnell, of Sandringham, Victoria. For services to blinded ex-servicemen.
- Arnold Cecil Moon, of Parkes, New South Wales. For services rendered in connection with patriotic and charitable organisations.
- Arthur Blackburn Smith, Commonwealth Public Service Inspector, Hobart.
- Frances Mary Smith, of South Yarra. For services rendered to the Commonwealth Government on matters of interior decorating.
- Mary Steel Stevenson, of Canberra. For public services.
- Richard Frank Tunley, of Clayfield, Brisbane. For services to deaf, dumb and blind children.
- Gertrude Mary Zichy Woinarski, of Mentone, Victoria. For services rendered in connection with charitable organisations.

=== Companions of the Imperial Service Order ===
Australian Civil Service.

- James Brophy, Auditor-General, Commonwealth of Australia.
- William Funnell, Lately Secretary of the Department of Labour and National Service.
- Victor Francos Turner, Chief Electoral Officer of the Commonwealth of Australia.

=== British Empire Medal (BEM) ===
Military Division

Royal Australian Navy

- Chief Engine Room Artificer Alwyn Dew Barlow, 20527.
- Chief Petty Officer Cecil Claude Bettens, 20723.

Army

- 2/96575 Staff-Sergeant William Ellwood Genner, Royal Australian Armoured Corps.
- 5/2009 Staff-Sergeant (temporary) Ray Godenzie, Royal Australian Army Service Corps.
- 3/117319 Sergeant William Joseph Hall, Royal Australian Engineers.
- 2/712 Staff-Sergeant William Cecil Lawes, Royal Australian Army Service Corps.
- 1/380 Warrant Officer Class II (temporary) Patrick Brennan Murtagh, Royal Australian Armoured Corps.
- 4/846 Warrant Officer Class II (temporary) John Joseph Scally, Royal Australian Infantry Corps.
- 8/308 Sergeant (temporary) Sina Malmaus, Royal Australian Infantry Corps.

Royal Australian Air Force

- A.33009 Flight Sergeant David Glynn Lloyd.
- A.3654 Flight Sergeant Daniel Arthur William Strong.
- A.3693 Flight Sergeant Albert Edward James Vizard.

=== Royal Red Cross (RRC) ===
==== Associate of the Royal Red Cross (ARRC) ====
- Major (temporary) Elizabeth Irene Uren (F.4/1004), Royal Australian Army Nursing Corps.
- Major (temporary) Jean Veitch (F.5/9), Royal Australian Army Nursing Corps.

Additional Associate

- Captain Perditta Marjorie McCarthy (F.2/2), Royal Australian Army Nursing Corps.

=== Air Force Cross (AFC) ===
- Squadron Leader James Stanley Gooch (05826).

=== Queen's Commendation for Valuable Service in the Air ===
Royal Australian Air Force

- Squadron Leader Charles Norman Geschke (033159).
- Flight Lieutenant Ian Keith Nelson Norris (022014).
- Flight Lieutenant Robert Alfred de Rusett Kydd (023853).
- Flying Officer Francis Gerald Bourke (022079).
- Warrant Officer John Spencer Edmonds (A.23856).
- Warrant Officer Colin Stephen Ryan (A.33235).

== Ceylon ==
=== Knight Bachelor ===
- Warusahennedige Abraham Bastian Bennet Soysa, Esq., CBE, Senator. For social services.

=== Order of Saint Michael and Saint George ===
==== Companion of the Order of St Michael and St George (CMG) ====
- Gunasena de Soyza, OBE, Permanent Secretary, Ministry of Defence and External Affairs.

=== Order of the British Empire ===
==== Knight Commander of the Order of the British Empire (KBE) ====
Civil Division

- The Honourable Mr. Kalutaravedage Deepal Susantha de Fonseka, Statesmen and Ambassador.
- The Honourable Mr. Pattiya Pathirannahalage Albert Frederick Peries, Speaker of the House of Representatives.

==== Commander of the Order of the British Empire (CBE) ====
Civil Division

- Alexander Nicholas D'Albrew Abeyesinghe, MBE, Member of Parliament for Negombo. For services to the Co-operative Movement.
- Ernest Peter Arnold Fernando. For social services.
- Paul Alfred John Hernu, OBE, Chairman, Colombo Port Commission.
- H. de Z. Siriwardena, Parliamentary Secretary, Ministry of Home Affairs.

==== Officer of the Order of the British Empire (OBE) ====
Military Division

- Lieutenant-Colonel Herbert Clifford Serasinghe, ED, Ceylon Army Medical Corps.

Civil Division

- A. Arulpiragasam, MBE, Government Agent, North Western Province.
- Homi Framjee Billimoria, MBE, Chief Architect, Public Works Department.
- Jayasuriya Aratchige Edward Mathew de Saram, MBE. For social services.
- Santiago Wilson de Silva, MBE, Deputy Inspector General of Police.
- James Lamb, Director, Tea Research Institute of Ceylon.
- Pararajasingam Nadesan, Director of Civil Aviation and Additional Secretary to the Prime Minister.
- Hanwedige Henry Oliver Waitson Peiris. For services to Commerce.
- John Marcus Senaveratna, MBE. For services to the study of the history of Ceylon.
- G. P. Tambayah, Government Agent, Western Province.

==== Member of the Order of the British Empire (MBE) ====
Military Division

- Major Bertram Lucien Seneviratne, Ceylon Light Infantry.

Civil Division

- Cyril Herbert Sooriaarachchi Amarasekera, Flying Instructor, Civil Aviation Department.
- Don Edmund Amarasekera, Chairman, Village Committee, Udugaha Pattu, Kalutara District.
- Leon Louis Attygalle, Municipal Treasurer, Colombo Municipality.
- Mohamed Falil Abdul Caffoor. For services to Commerce.
- Gerald Henry Cooray, MD, MRCS, Professor of Pathology, University of Ceylon.
- Neville Joseph Louis Jansz, Assistant Secretary, Ministry of Defence and External Affairs.
- Don Edward Victor Wanniarachchige Jayamanne, Actor and Producer.
- Don Timothy John Jayesinghe. For services to Commerce.
- Walatara Acharige David Silva Karunaratne. For charitable services.
- Nobel Irene Kiriella. For social services.
- G. H. P. Leembruggen, Assistant Superintendent of Police (Traffic).
- Salebhoy Husainbhoy Moosajee. For services to Commerce.
- Anton Wickremasinghe. For services to Commerce.
- Sarah Laurencina Wijesinghe. For charitable services.

=== British Empire Medal (BEM) ===
Civil Division

- Jayalath Yakkalamullage Ebert de Silva, Electrical Foreman, Department of Government Electrical Undertakings.
- Fitzroy Valentine Pinto Jayawardena, Acting Chief Welfare Officer, Ministry of Transport and Works.
- Murugupillai Navaratnasamy, Agricultural Instructor, Department of Agriculture.

== Pakistan ==
=== Knighthood ===
- Eric Alexander Franklin, CBE, Establishment Officer to the Government of Pakistan.

=== Order of Saint Michael and Saint George ===
==== Companion of the Order of St Michael and St George (CMG) ====
- Albert Ernest Wright, OBE, Member, Central Board of Revenue, and Joint Secretary, Ministry of Finance.

=== Order of the British Empire ===
==== Commander of the Order of the British Empire (CBE) ====
Military Division

- Colonel (temporary) Harold Sydney James Jelf, Corps of Royal Electrical and Mechanical Engineers.
- Brigadier (temporary) Ronald Arran Graham Nicholson, Royal Pakistan Regiment of Artillery.
- Brigadier (temporary) Geoffrey Pigot, British Service (Special List).
- Colonel (temporary) Arthur Lenthall Harcourt-Powell, British Service (Special List).

Civil Division

- Arthur George Bunn, Director of Inspection, Central Board of Revenue, Ministry of Finance.
- Wing Commander Robert Milroy Hayes (Retd.), Deputy Secretary, Ministry of Defence.
- Colonel Campbell Aubrey Kenneth Innes-Wilson, OBE, Surveyor General of Pakistan.

==== Officer of the Order of the British Empire (OBE) ====
Military Division

- Lieutenant-Colonel (temporary) John Crawford Dick, Royal Army Ordnance Corps.
- Lieutenant-Colonel (temporary) James Guilford Wood, Corps of Royal Engineers.
- Acting Squadron Leader Andrew Frederick McCarthy, MBE (57816), Royal Air Force.

Civil Division

- Captain (E) William Frederick Ellis, RN (Retd.), lately Principal Officer, Mercantile Marine Department.
- Oliver George Holt Ormerod, Superintendent, Watch and Ward, East Bengal Railway.
- Archibald Reglan Hope Veevers, BEM, Deputy Master of the Mint.

==== Member of the Order of the British Empire (MBE) ====
Military Division

- Acting Lieutenant Commander (E) Malcolm Neil Stevenson, DSC, Royal Navy.
- Warrant Officer I (temporary) Gordon William Cooper, Corps of Royal Electrical and Mechanical Engineers.
- Captain Walter Raymond Hodgson, Pakistan Remounts, Veterinary and Farms Corps.

Civil Division

- Anne Brotherton, Principal, Frontier College for Women, Peshawar.
- John Cuthbert Heathcote, Radio Traffic Officer, Central Telegraph Office.
- Thomas Johnstone, General Staff Officer II (Civil), Directorate of Military Training and Education.
- Robert Malcolm Massingham, Permanent Officer Supervisor, Naval Headquarters.
- William Stopforth, Manager, Lithoprinting Office (Class I), Survey of Pakistan.

=== British Empire Medal (BEM) ===
Military Division

- 844807 Flight Sergeant (Acting Warrant Officer) Kenneth Victor Jackson, Royal Air Force.

Civil Division

- Alexander McIntosh Webster, Foreman of Inspection (Magazine), Naval Armament Inspections.
