= List of musicians at Welsh cathedrals =

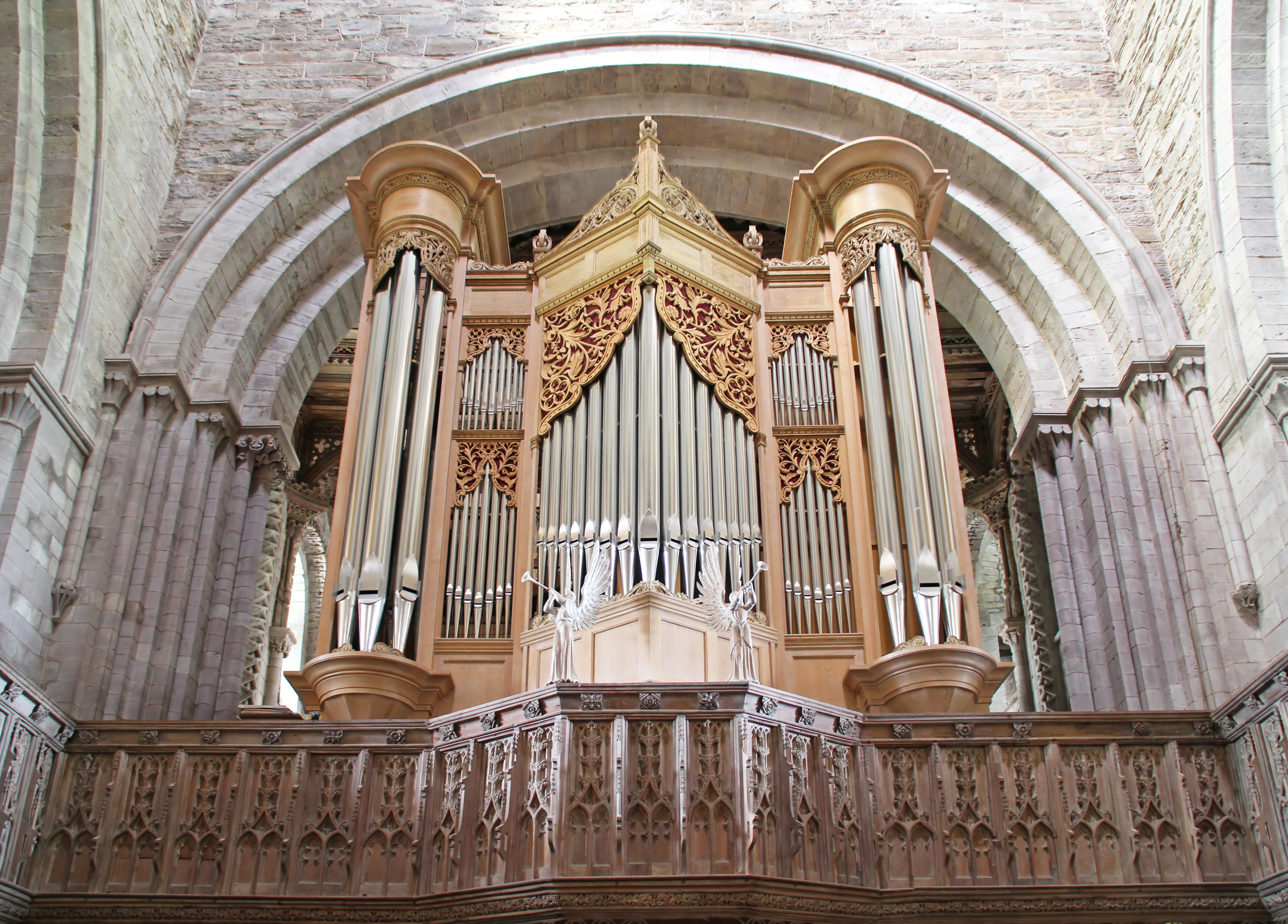
St Davids Cathedral organ

This is a list of musicians at Welsh cathedrals.

== Bangor Cathedral ==
The 14th century poet Dafydd ap Gwilym wrote of the organ and choir of Bangor Cathedral.

=== Organists ===
- 1644 Thomas Bolton
- 1689 (A Vicar Choral) ?
- 1691 Thomas Roberts
- 1705 ? Priest
- 1708 ? Smith
- 1710 ? Ferrer
- 1713 John Rathbone
- 1721 Thomas Rathbone
- 1750 Thomas Lloyd
- 1778 Richard Jarred
- 1782 William Shrubsole
- 1784 Edmund Olive
- 1793 Joseph Pring
- 1842 James Sharpe Pring
- 1868 Robert Roberts
- 1872 Roland Rogers
- 1892 T. Westlake Morgan
- 1906 Roland Rogers (reappointed)
- 1928 Leslie Douglas Paul
- 1970 John Hywel
- 1972 Andrew John Goodwin
- 2009 Graham Eccles
- 2014 Martin Brown

Director of Music

- 2014 Paul Booth
- 2021 Joe Cooper

== Brecon Cathedral ==
Brecon Cathedral is the cathedral of the Church in Wales Diocese of Swansea and Brecon.

=== Organists and Directors of Music ===
- 1923 John Humphrey Carden
- 1956 David Gwerfyl Davies (formerly organist of The Church of St. Nicholas, Kings Norton)
- 1963 Michael Bryan Hesford (later organist of St Mary's Church, Melton Mowbray)
- 1966 David Patrick Gedge
- 2007 Mark Duthie
- 2017 Stephen Power
- 2025 David Stevens

=== Assistant Organists ===
- 1968 Hazel Davies
- 2007 Meirion Wynn Jones
- 2012 Paul Hayward
- 2014 Stephen Power
- 2017 Tom Coxhead (currently Director of Music at Newport Cathedral)
- 2018 Jonathan Pilgrim (Acting Director of Music)
- 2025 Matthew McVey

=== Sub-Organists ===
- 2023 Dr. August Guan (later principal organist of St Gregory's Church, Cheltenham)

== Cardiff Metropolitan Cathedral ==
Cardiff Metropolitan Cathedral is the cathedral of the Roman Catholic Archdiocese of Cardiff.

=== Directors of Music and Organists ===
- 1974 Hellier Johns
- 1980 David Neville
- 2005 Dominic Neville
- 2017 Jeffrey Howard

=== Assistant Organists ===
- 1974 Nigel Davies
- 1976 Keith Lowe
- 1988-1991 Theodore Saunders
- 1991-1997 Steven Maxson and
- 1991-1993 William Reynolds
- 1997-2001 Jeremy Rouse

=== Master of the Choristers ===
- James Neville

=== Organ Scholar ===
- 2009-2012 James Wall
- 2016 - 2017 Joseph Cavalli-Price

== Llandaff Cathedral ==
Llandaff Cathedral has only dedicated choir school in the Church in Wales.

=== Organists and Masters of the Choristers ===
- 1861 John Bernard Wilkes
- 1866 Francis Edward Gladstone
- 1870 Theodore Edward Aylward
- 1876 Charles Lee Williams
- 1882 Hugh Brooksbank (Note: Brooksbank was the organiser of the first Cardiff Music Festival.)
- 1894 George Galloway Beale
- 1937 William Henry Gabb
- 1946 Albert Vernon Butcher
- 1949 Thomas Hallford
- 1950 Eric Arthur Coningsby
- 1952 Charles Kenneth Turner
- 1957 Eric Howard Fletcher
- 1958 Robert Henry Joyce
- 1974 Michael John Smith
- 2000 Richard Moorhouse
- 2014 Jonathan Bielby (interim)
- 2016 Stephen Moore

=== Assistant Organists ===
- 1894 Arthur Charles Edwards
- 1940 R. M. Powney
- 1966–1970 Graham John Elliott (afterwards organist of St Asaph Cathedral)
- 1970–1980 Anthony Burns-Cox (later organist of Romsey Abbey)
- 1980–2010 Michael Hoeg
- 2010–2012 James Norrey (afterwards Assistant Director of Music at Newcastle Cathedral)
- 2012–2013 Sachin Gunga (post dissolved December 2013)

=== Assistant Director of Music ===
- 2021 Aaron Shilson

== Newport Cathedral ==
Newport Cathedral is the cathedral of the Church in Wales Diocese of Monmouth.

=== Organists/Choirmasters ===
- 1894-1934 J A Gaccon
- 1934-1941 C J Ball
- 1941-1963 Charles St Ervan Johns
- 1964−1979 Donald Bate
- 1979 Christopher Barton
- 2015 Dr. Emma Gibbins
- 2024 Tom Coxhead

=== Assistant organists ===
- 1992-1995 Peter Dyke
- 2006 Ronny Krippner (later Director of Music at Croydon Minster; currently Director of Music at Ripon Cathedral)
- 2007 Christopher Denton
- 2010 Jeremy Blasby

== St Asaph Cathedral ==
In 2018 St Asaph Cathedral made its professional music staff redundant.

=== Organists ===
- 1620 John Day
- 1630 Abednego D. Perkins
- 1631 John Wilson
- 1669 Thomas Ottey
- 1680 William Key
- 1686 Thomas Hughes
- 1694 Alexander Gerard
- 1738 John Gerard
- 1782 John Jones
- 1785 Edward Bailey
- 1791 Charles Spence
- 1794 Henry Hayden
- 1834 Robert Augustus Atkins
- 1889 Llewellyn Lloyd
- 1897 Hugh Percy Allen
- 1898 Archibald Wayet Wilson
- 1901 Cyril Bradley Rootham
- 1902 William Edward Belcher
- 1917 Harold Carpenter Lumb Stocks
- 1956 Robert Duke Dickinson
- 1962 James Roland Middleton
- 1970 Graham John Elliott
- 1981 John Theodore Belcher
- 1985 Hugh Davies
- 1998 Graham Eccles
- 2004 - 2018 Alan McGuinness
- 2019 Paul Booth - Director of Music

=== Assistant organists ===
- 1875–1889 Llewelyn Lloyd
- 1897–1901 F. Walton Evans
- 1978–1982 Patrick Larley

=== Assistant Director of Music ===
- 2004–2018 John Hosking; later Director of Music at Holy Trinity, Southport (2018 - 2022) then Organist in Residence at Blackburn Cathedral.

== St Davids Cathedral ==
Organists at St Davids Cathedral include the father of the composer Thomas Tomkins.

=== Organist and Master of the Choristers ===
- 1490 Priest Vicars
- 1509 John Norman
- 1563 Thomas Elliot
- c.1570–c.1586 Thomas Tomkins (father of the composer Thomas Tomkins)
- 1713 R. Mordant
- 1714 Henry Mordant
- 1719 Richard Tomkins
- 1719 Williarn Bishop
- 1720 Henry Williams
- 1725 Matthew Maddox
- 1734 Matthew Philpott
- 1793 Arthur Richardson
- 1827 John Barrett
- 1851 William Peregrine Propert
- 1883 Frederick Garton
- 1894 D. John Codner
- 1896 Herbert C. Morris
- 1922 Joseph Soar
- 1953 Peter Boorman
- 1977 Nicholas Jackson
- 1984 Malcolm Watts
- 1990 Kerry Beaumont (later Organist of Ripon Cathedral and Coventry Cathedral)
- 1995 Geraint Bowen (later Director of Music at Hereford Cathedral)
- 2001 Timothy Noon (later Organist of Liverpool Metropolitan Cathedral; currently Organist of Exeter Cathedral)
- 2007 Alexander Mason (currently Director of Music at Lancing College)
- 2011 Daniel Cook (later Sub-Organist of Westminster Abbey; currently Organist of Durham Cathedral)
- 2013 Oliver Waterer (currently Organist of Selby Abbey)
- 2022 Simon Pearce

=== Assistant Organist ===
- 1991 Michael Slaney
- 1998 Simon Pearce

=== Assistant Director of Music ===
- 2022 Laurence John

=== Organ Scholars ===
- 2016 Aaron Shilson (currently Assistant Director of Music at Llandaff Cathedral)
- 2017 Rupert Jackson (subsequently Organ Scholar of Magdalen College, Oxford)
- 2018 Emily India Evans (subsequently Organ Scholar of Sidney Sussex College, Cambridge)
- 2019 Joshua Roebuck (currently Organist of Westwood United Methodist Church, Los Angeles)
- 2020 Michael D'Avanzo (subsequently Organ Scholar of Jesus College, Cambridge, currently Organ Scholar at St Albans Cathedral)
- 2021 Thomas Hawkes (Acting Assistant Director of Music, now Organist and Choirmaster at Cirencester Parish Church)
- 2022 James Watson (subsequently Organ Scholar of Newcastle Cathedral, currently Organ Scholar at Liverpool Cathedral)
- 2024 Felix Petheu
- 2025 Llewelyn Blezard-Greenwell (currently Assisant Organist at Beverley Minster)
- 2026 Isaac Hanfrey

== Swansea Cathedral ==
St Joseph's Cathedral is the cathedral of the Roman Catholic Diocese of Menevia

=== Diocesan Director of Music ===
- Paul Brophy

== Wrexham Cathedral ==
The Cathedral of Our Lady of Sorrows is the cathedral of the Roman Catholic Diocese of Wrexham.

=== Choir director ===
- Paul Booth

== See also ==
- List of musicians at English cathedrals

== Sources ==
- Evans, Robert; Humphreys, Maggie (1997). Dictionary of Composers for the Church in Great Britain and Ireland. Bloomsbury Publishing. ISBN 978-1-4411-3796-8.
