= John Harris (priest) =

Welsh Anglican priest (1932–2019)

John Harris (12 March 1932 – 12 September 2019) was Dean of Brecon from 1993 to 1998.

He was educated at St David's College, Lampeter and ordained in 1958. After curacies in Pontnewynydd and Bassaleg he was held incumbencies in Penmaen, Newport, Maindee and Llanddew

== See also ==
Church in Wales titles
Preceded by Huw Jones	Dean of Brecon Cathedral; 1993 – 1998	Succeeded by Geraint Morgan Hugh Hughes
