= William Jones (dean of Brecon) =

Welsh Anglican priest (1897–1974)

William Edward Jones (11 December 1897 – 11 June 1974) was an eminent Welsh Anglican priest in the 20th century.

He was born in 1897, educated at Jesus College, Oxford, and ordained in 1922. His first post was as a Minor Canon at Brecon Cathedral after which he Priest in Charge at Kondinin, Western Australia. Later he held Incumbencies at St Luke's, Cottesloe and then St Mary's; West Perth. He was Dean of Brecon Cathedral from 1950 to 1964 then Vicar of Penally until retirement in 1969.

He died in 1974 in Pembrokeshire. His widow, Rachel Jones, was appointed BBC Governor for Wales, a post which caused controversy as she was a non–Welsh speaker.

Church in Wales titles
Preceded by Edward Roberts	Dean of Brecon; 1950–1964	Succeeded by Gwynno James
