= King Henry VIII 3–19 School, Abergavenny =

Coordinates: 51.8313°N 3.0173°W

King Henry VIII 3–19 School
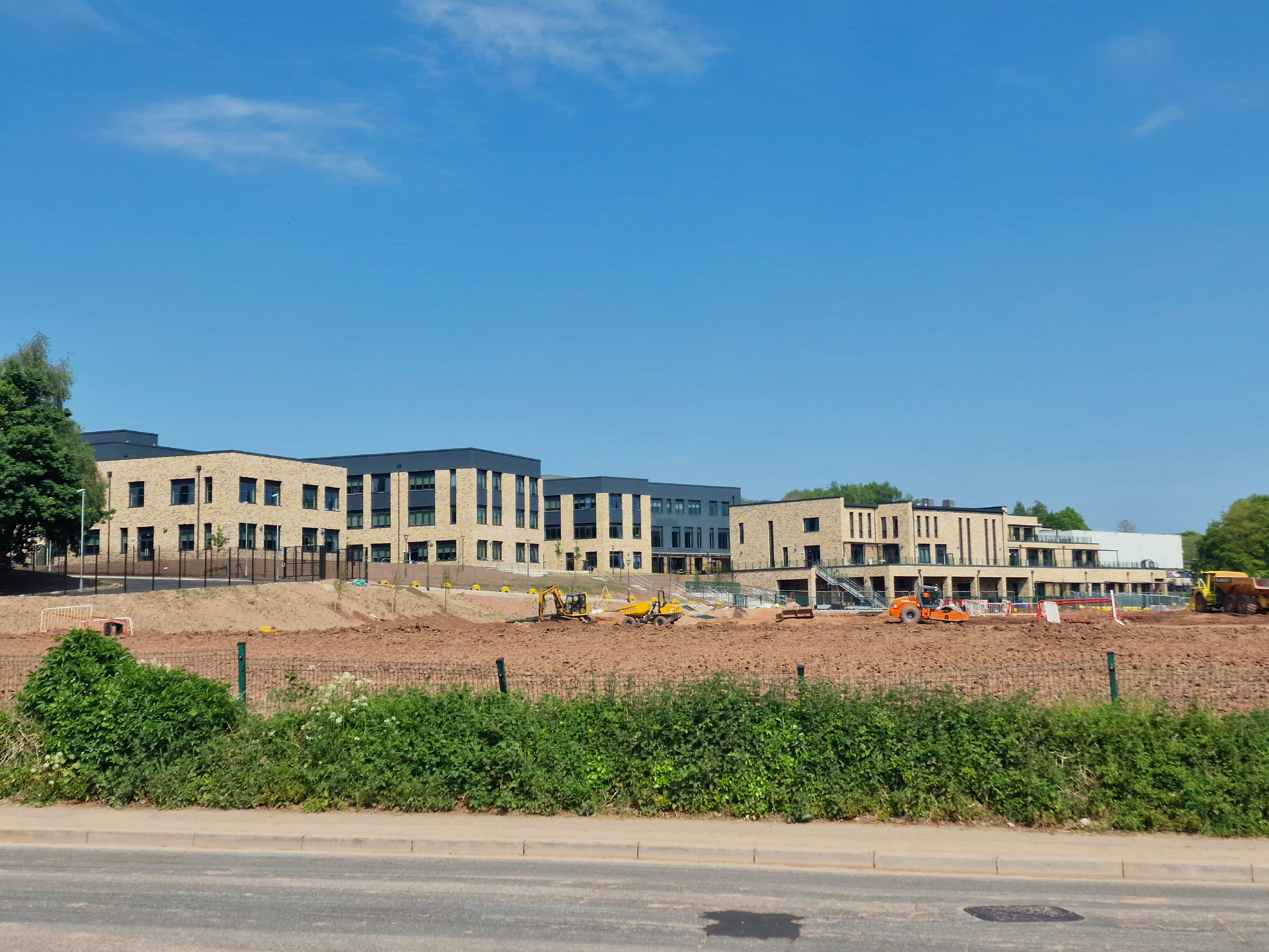
- Current Upper and Lower School Buildings in use since May 2025

Location
- Old Hereford Road; Abergavenny, Monmouthshire, NP7 6EP; Wales

Information
- Former names: King Henry VIII School King Henry VIII Grammar School
- Type: State school
- Mottoes: We believe in the limitless capacity of everyone to achieve great things (Previous Mottos: "Respecting tradition, embracing the future" Welsh: Parchu traddodiad, cynnwys y dyfodol Ut Prosim; Latin: That I might be of service)
- Established: 1542; 484 years ago
- Founder: King Henry VIII
- Local authority: Monmouthshire County Council
- Head Teacher: Jonathan Watson
- Primary years taught: Reception – Year 6
- Secondary years taught: Year 7 – Year 11
- Gender: Coeducational
- Age: 3 to 19
- Enrolment: 1900 (Approx)
- Average class size: 30
- Houses: Aragon, Howard, Parr, Seymour
- Colours: Bottle Green and Yellow (Previously: Black and yellow)
- Website: https://www.kinghenryviii3to19school.co.uk

King Henry VIII 3–19 School Abergavenny (Welsh: Ysgol y Brenin Harri VIII) is an English-language all-through school in the town of Abergavenny, in the county of Monmouthshire, Wales.

== History ==
=== Founding 1542–1664 ===
Following the Reformation of the 1530s, the Letters Patent setting up the school were issued on 24 July 1542. By these, tithes assigned to local churches at Llanfihangel Crucorney, Llanddewi Rhydderch, Llanelen, Llanddewi Skirrid, Bryngwyn and Llanwenarth and belonging previously to the Benedictine priory were now given over to the new school. In addition a much richer prize, the tithes of Badgeworth in Gloucestershire which had previously belonged to Usk priory were given over to Abergavenny's use. Finally the priory chapel of St. Mary's was to become the new parish church of Abergavenny and so the redundant church of St. John's could be used to house the new school.

The monies available from these tithes were to be put into trust controlled by "the bailliffs and commonality", the forerunners of the Town Council. It was to provide a Free Grammar School where Latin grammar was taught. The new grammar school was named after its benefactor Henry VIII who also appointed its first headmaster, Richard Oldsworthy. The school when it opened had 26 pupils, all boys aged between 7 and 14.

=== The connection with Jesus College, Oxford 1664–1887 ===
The first century of the school's life was uneventful and change only came as a result of financial mismanagement by the local trustees who had leased out the Badgeworth lands for an undervalued rent: when the 99-year lease came to an end in 1664 it passed to Jesus College, Oxford, who in return provided not only an equal rent but a Fellowship and Scholarship to the college. This began the close connection between the school and the college which not only provided a home for many of its ablest pupils, but also provided the school with its headmasters.

An Act of Parliament in 1760 reorganised the school's governance. Henceforth Jesus College, which had finally gained control of the Gloucester tithes, was responsible for paying the headmaster and his assistant. The Act did have some effect as the old school building was pulled down and replaced on site with the religious tower and fine Georgian master's house which still stands today. By the time of the headmastership of the Reverend William Morgan (1765–75) the school was flourishing with some 70–80 boys.

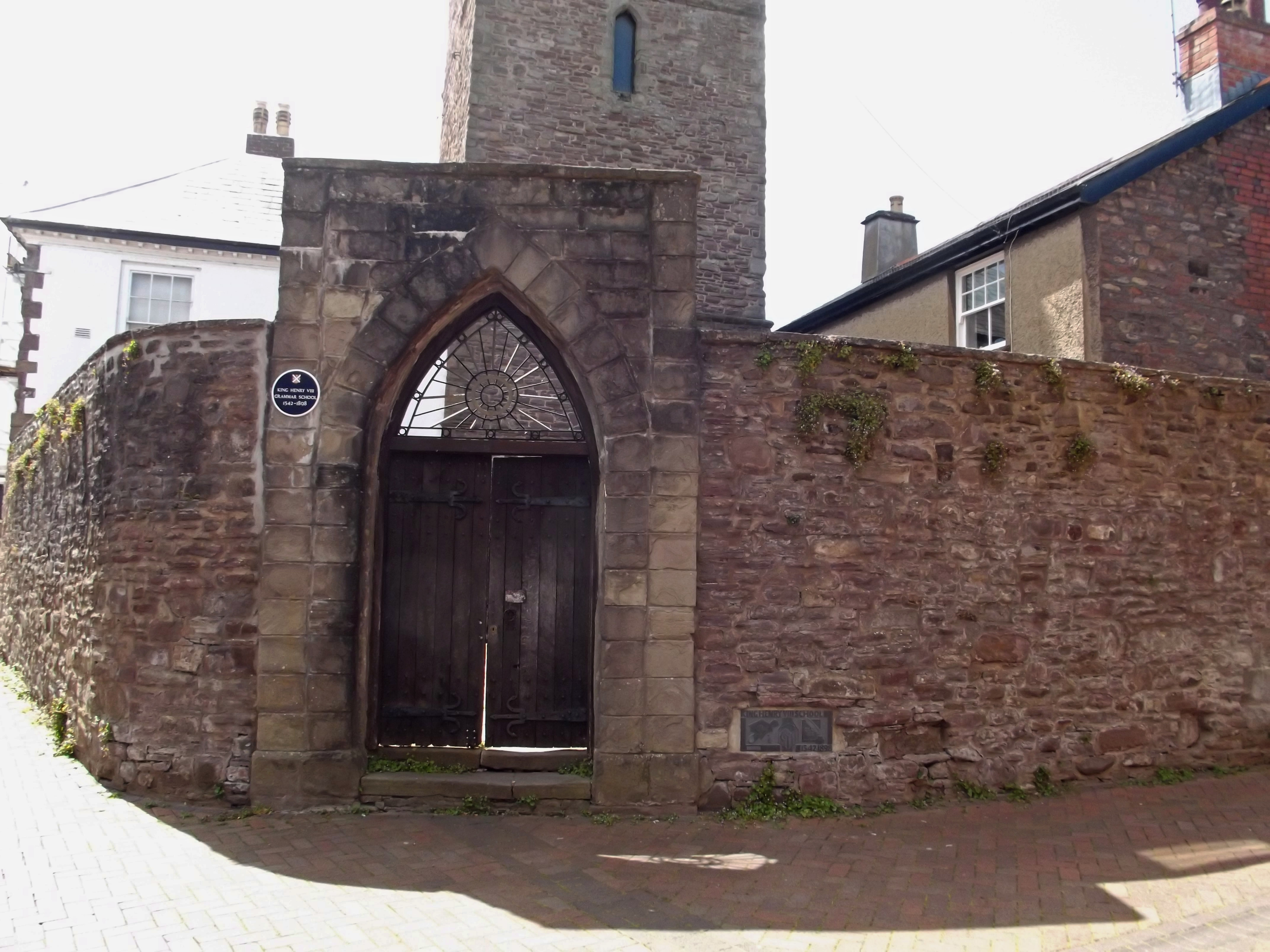
The religious tower and master's house

Change began in the 1870s. The Headmaster, James Webber, reorganised the curriculum, teaching classics, maths, drawing, French, writing, divinity and arithmetic. He built two new classrooms within the confines of St. John's. By 1878, 73 pupils were being taught by three masters. By 1887 the charity commissioners had prepared a scheme to create a second grade commercial school, on a new site, and it was this proposition that resulted in the severing of the centuries-old links between the school and Jesus College.

=== A century of reorganisation 1891–1972 ===
The first attempt at reorganisation was the 1891 scheme which proposed the creation of a 200 pupil school on a 9-acre site on Pen-y-pound. Building of the school was delayed by many problems and was not completed until 1898 at a cost of £6,945. The school at this time was supposed to be a grammar school taking pupils from all over North Monmouthshire with a curriculum of Latin, English, History, Geography, French, Arithmetic, Algebra, Trigonometry and Chemistry.

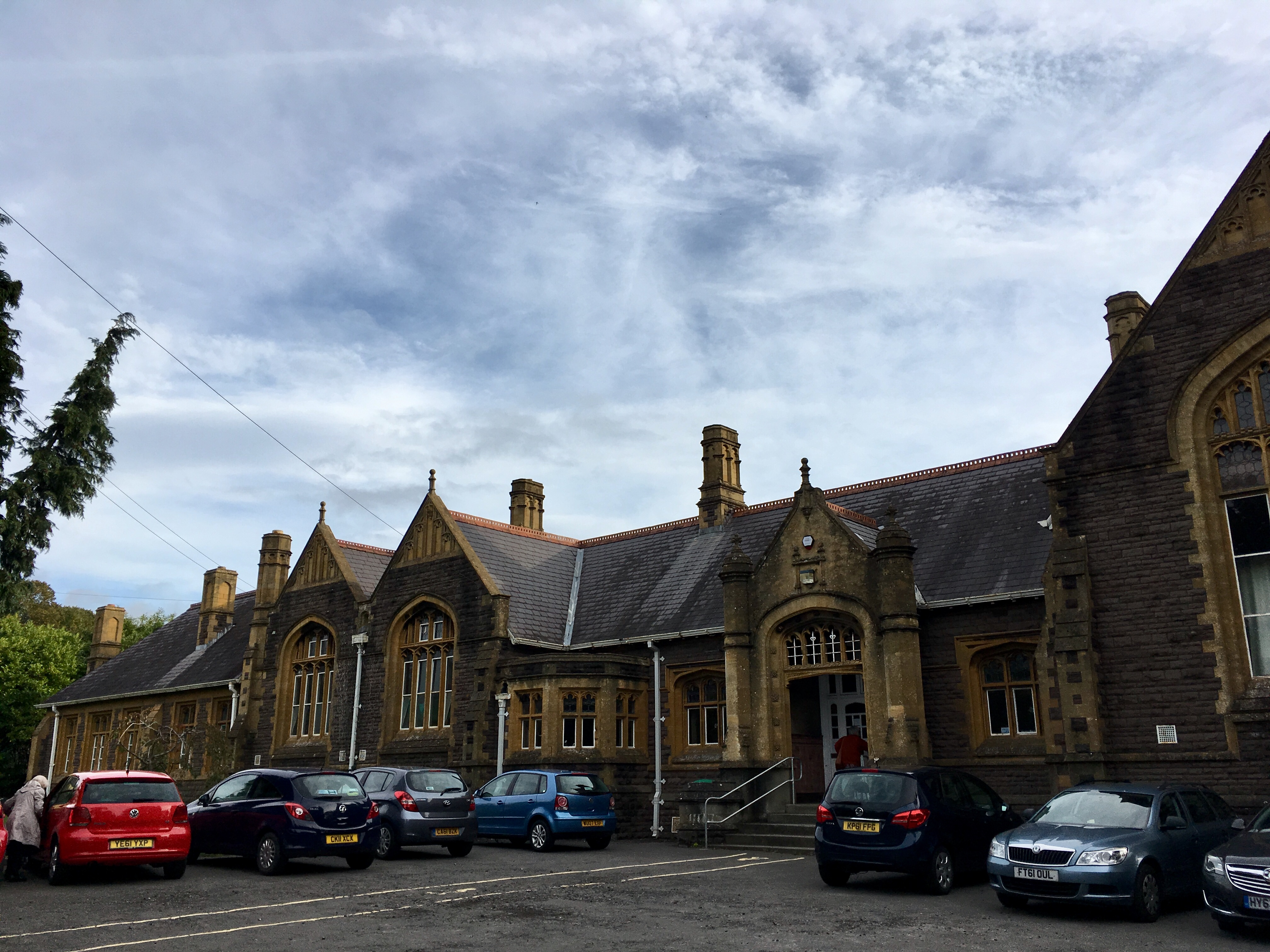
The 200 pupil School at Pen-y-Pound, now the Melville Centre

In the 1920s there was new building with three classrooms, a gym and a library. The Old Boys' Association was founded at a meeting on 7 November 1923 and was soon thriving, with branches of the Abergavenny Society in both London and Aberystwyth. By 1930 the school had 150 pupils. The new sciences of Physics and Biology were introduced in the period and the increased importance of metalwork and woodwork led to the building of a handicrafts room.

Following Butler's Education Act of 1944, Monmouthshire County Council put forward three options for Abergavenny: boys and girls grammar schools and a secondary modern school; a co-educational grammar school and a secondary modern school or a multilateral school. All three options were to be tried over the next 25 years.

Harry Newcombe retired as headmaster in 1954. He had managed to gain the school a good reputation as a classical grammar school. The Local Education Authority issued a Statutory Notice on 21 September 1954 to set up a multilateral school of 850, the first stage of which would be the amalgamation of the Boys' and Girls' Grammar Schools. Between 1954 and 1956 plans were laid by the authority for an enlarged mixed grammar school and finally provided for a school of 510 pupils with a 60 pupil sixth form.

The new school on the Old Hereford Road site was to be the first phase of the multilateral school, the present Upper school. It was to have an assembly hall, a gym and three floors of classrooms and practical rooms. Building was only begun in 1960 and so the school was not opened until 1963. It was to be made up of a total of 448 pupils from King Henry VIII Boys Grammar School, the Girls' Intermediate High School, St. John's Private school and the Convent school.

The transition from mixed grammar to comprehensive school was carried out under the headmaster, Russell Edwards. This involved the building of a new school adjoining the grammar school on the Pen-y-pound site. It also involved the incorporation of Grofield Secondary Modern School which had been established in 1947. Until the new building was completed in 1972 this required the juggling of both staff and pupils between the different sites. The new comprehensive kept the name of its predecessor. The old grammar school became the Upper School while the new building became the Lower School.

=== Recent History 1972– ===
The school with a planned population of 850 pupils when conceived in the 1940s had a peak population of 1825 pupils in 1983.

In 1983 as part of the International Year of Communications the school participated in a satellite quiz with Parramatta High School in New South Wales, Australia, which was celebrating its 70th anniversary. The school saw a sharp decline in numbers over the course of the 1980s, with 1200 pupils in 1990. Pupil numbers have remained broadly consistent over the following two decades.

In 2021, a new school building was proposed to replace the building built in 1972, with funding of £50 million from the Welsh Government. The building would have space for students ages 3–19. Construction began in Summer 2022 with a projected completion of the building itself by September 2024.

After construction of the new building began, a new name 'Abergavenny Learning Centre' was proposed. However, this was not used as there was significant backlash from local residents. As such, the name 'King Henry VIII 3–19 School' was adopted as an alternative.

Students moved into the new building in May 2025, and work for the demolition of the old school, and construction of the sports and outdoor recreational facilities in their place, began at the same time.

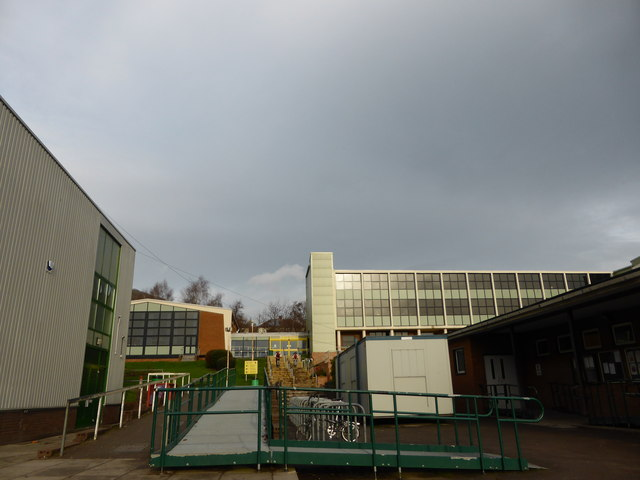
The Upper School Reception and main Upper school building as viewed from the adjacent Leisure Centre

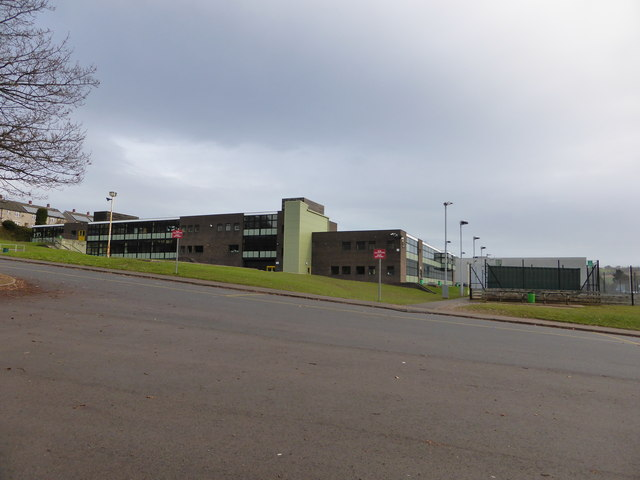
The building constructed in 1972 as viewed from the Staff Car Park

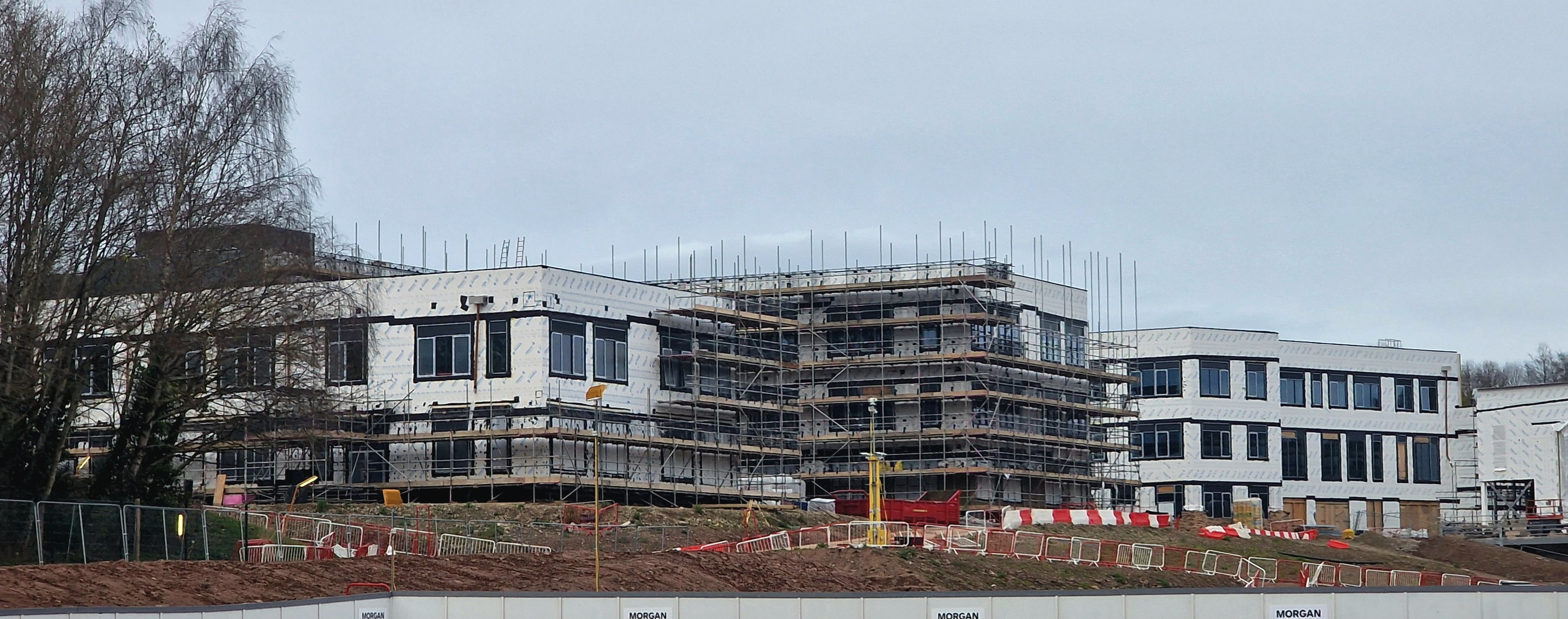
The new upper school building under construction

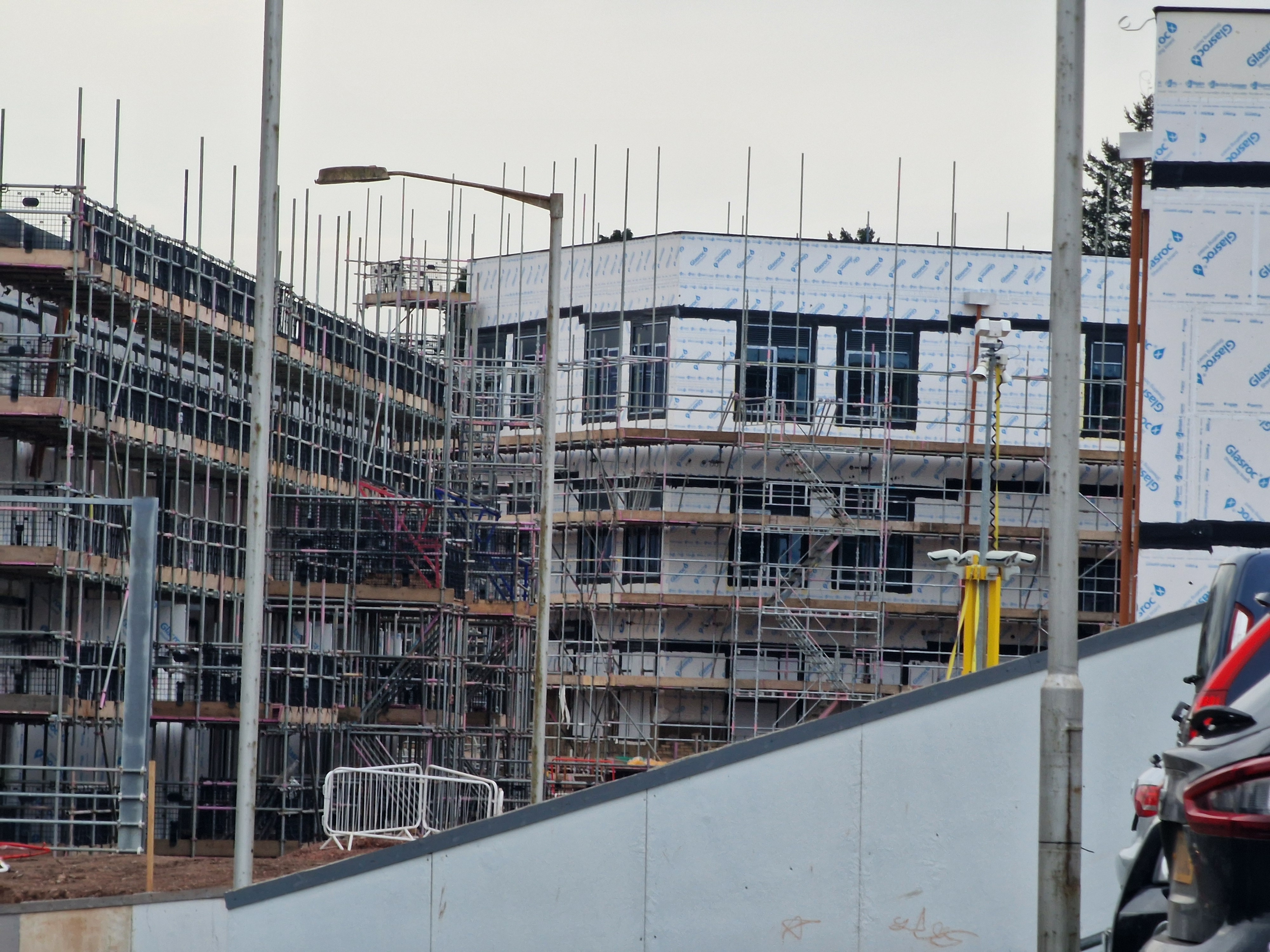
The space between the new Upper and Lower School buildings Under Construction.

== School houses ==
The school originally had two houses Oppidan and Rustican, from the Latin for Town and Country. As the school grew, a new house structure was created based on four of Henry VIII's wives: Aragon (Catherine of Aragon), Howard (Catherine Howard), Parr (Catherine Parr) and Seymour (Jane Seymour). These houses continue to compete at the annual Eisteddfodau and at sporting occasions.

== Headmasters and head teachers ==
The known heads at the school since its founding are as follows:

- 1542 Richard Oldsworthy
- c.1626 Morgan Lewis
- c.1631 Morris Hughes
- 1643–1661 Henry Vaughan
- 1661–1662 John Cragge
- 1662–1663 Thomas Franklyn
- 1663 Nicholas Billingsley
- 1670–1674 Richard Lucas
- 1674–1684 Henry Rogers
- 1702–1712 Morgan Lewis
- 1713–1716 Thomas Watkins
- 1716–1724 William Parry
- 1724–1732 William Thomas
- 1765–1775 William Morgan
- 1775–1786 Edmund Sandford
- 1786–1795 John George
- 1795–1800 Charles Powell
- 1800–1805 John Hughes
- 1805–1806 John Llewellyn
- c.1821 Thomas Williams
- 1821–1823 Charles Hand
- 1823–1828 Aaron Rogers
- 1828–1832 Jenkin Hughes
- 1833–1834 James Jones
- 1834–1835 James Gabb
- 1835–1876 Henry Peake
- 1876–1898 James Webber
- 1898–1919 Headland Sifton
- 1919–1954 Harry Newcombe
- 1954–1960 Thomas Edwards
- 1960–1962 Harold Sharpe
- 1962–1968 Gilmour Isaac
- 1968 Leonard Porter
- 1969–1985 Russell Edwards
- c.1985 Derek Fisher
- c.1995 Michael Brearley
- 2002–2009 Gareth Barker
- 2009–2013 Nicholas Oaten
- 2013–2014 Yvonne Jones
- 2014–2022 Elspeth Lewis
- 2022–2023 Mark Stockham (Acting Head)
- 2023– Jonathan Watson

== Notable alumni ==
- David Lewis (1520–1584), the first Principal of Jesus College, Oxford.
- William Wroth (1576–1641), puritan and founder of the first Independent church in Wales.
- St. David Lewis (1616–1679), a Jesuit who was canonised in the Roman Catholic Church in 1970.
- William Jones (1755–1821), evangelical clergyman.
- David Rees (1918–2013), mathematician.
- Raymond Williams (1921–1988), Marxist critic.
- John Osmond (b.1946), former director of the Institute of Welsh Affairs.
- Graham John Elliott (b. 1947), organist of St Asaph Cathedral and master of the music of Chelmsford Cathedral.
- Penelope Fillon (b. 1956), wife of former Prime Minister of France, François Fillon.
- Owen Sheers (b. 1974), poet.
- Matthew Jay (1978–2003), musician.
- Oliver Thornton (b. 1979), actor.
- Becky James (b. 1991), cyclist.

== Welsh government school banding ==
When the Welsh government started grouping schools into five bands in 2011, the school was placed in Band 3, assessed on its performance in the academic year 2010–11.

In the 2012 assessment this had fallen to Band 5. The year's figures brought the Government's banding system under severe criticism from teaching unions and opposition political parties. The results were described as being based on "arbitrary and misleading" figures and "not credible", "crude" and "vague and confusing".

The school remained in Band 5 in 2013.

Early in 2015, the Welsh Government replaced the former number-based banding system with a more colourful approach. The school was rated 'amber', meaning "in need of improvement".

Following an assessment of 'adequate' by Estyn in 2015, Elspeth Lewis, headteacher, was quoted in the South Wales Argos saying, "The report accurately reflects the current position of the school. But there has been a relentless focus on standards, teaching and learning and leadership over the past 18 months. As a school we have an accurate picture of where we are and are committed to further improving in each key area."

Most recently, an assessment by Estyn in November 2022 concluded that the school was "in need of significant improvement" citing the need to improve safeguarding issues identified during the inspection as well as the need to "improve the effectiveness of teaching and assessment so that pupils are constantly challenged to achieve their potential".

== Motto ==
The school is associated with three separate mottos. For many centuries the school's motto had been 'that we shall be of service' (Latin: Ut Prosim).

The subsequent motto was "Respecting tradition, embracing the future" Welsh: Parchu traddodiad, cynnwys y dyfodol.

In 2023, with the advent of the new school building, a new motto was introduced in order to represent the new start of the school and it's merging with Deri View Primary School, a local school nearby to the School Site. The new school motto is: "We believe in the limitless capacity of everyone to achieve great things."

== See also ==
- List of the oldest schools in the United Kingdom
