= Walter Hartley =

Walter Hartley may refer to:

- Walter Hartley (organist) (1879–1969), English organist and composer
- Walter Noel Hartley (1845–1913), English chemist
- Walter S. Hartley (1927–2016), American composer
