= Derek Hunt =

British glass artist

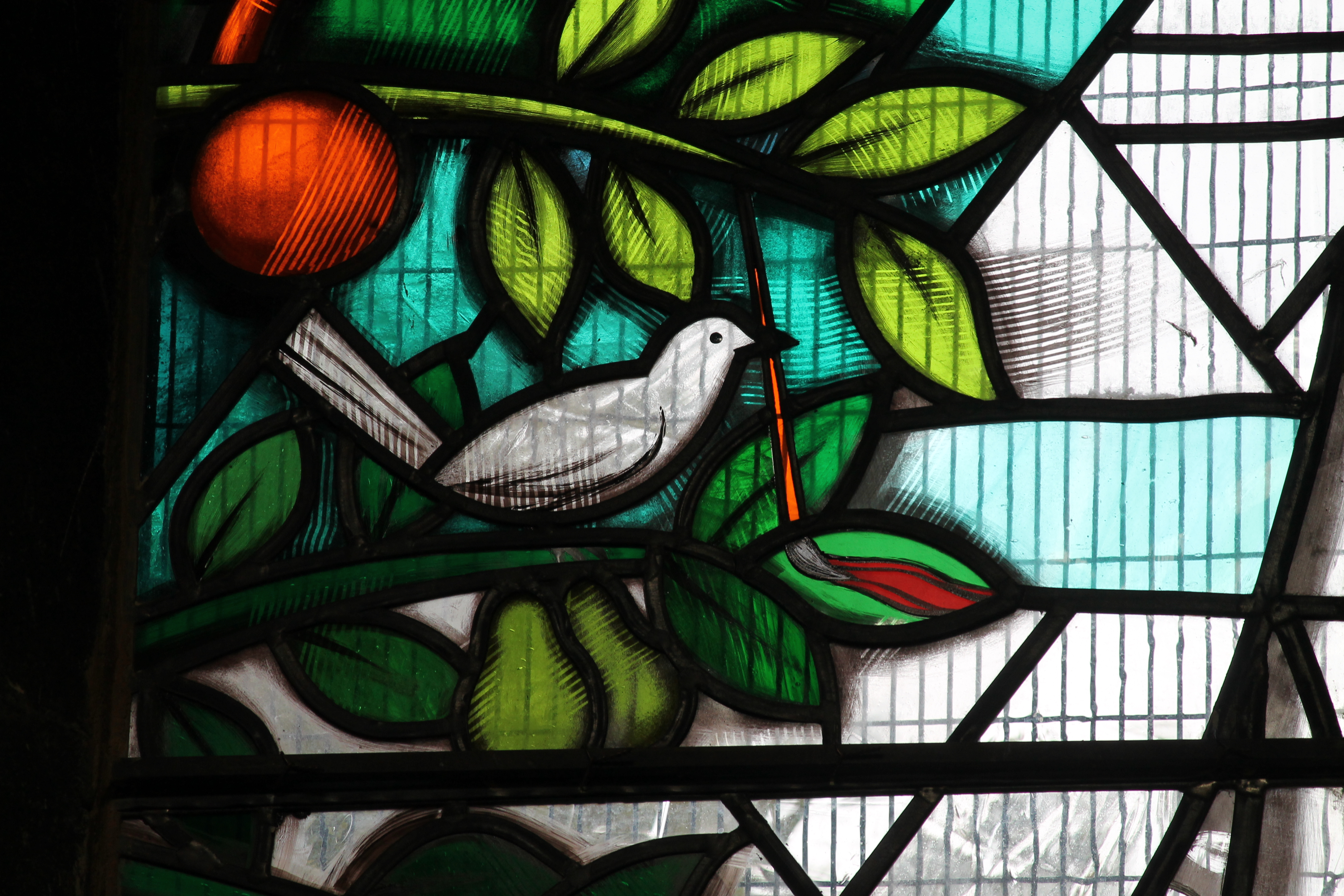
- Detail from Tree of Life, St Mary's Church, Melton Mowbray

Derek Hunt (born 1962) is a British glass artist and educator who designs glass artworks for public spaces, including libraries, schools, hospitals, theatres, and churches. He works with sculptural objects which can be hung on wires or fixed to walls, as well as traditional stained glass.

He works from Limelight Studios Ltd in Leicestershire, England. Established in 1985 they are experts in the conservation of historic stained glass and leaded glass windows.

Hunt is a mentor for stained glass artists on the BBC series Make it at Market.

== Education ==
- B.A. (Hons) Degree in Art and Design, Edinburgh Art School 1980 - 84

== Notable work ==
In 2017 Hunt designed and made a new north aisle window for St Mary's Church, Melton Mowbray in memory of John Plumb, a major church benefactor. The Tree of Life includes the coat of arms for Melton Borough Council and Melton Mowbray Town Estate. Other local references include a pork pie and Stilton cheese, and a dove with a brush dipped in red paint. This refers to an 1837 incident in which a drunk Marquis of Waterford and friends painted Melton Mowbray's toll-bar and other buildings red.

Hunt has undertaken stained glass conservation work on a number of notable buildings including Glasgow Cathedral, Coventry Cathedral, Kenilworth Castle Warwickshire, Oscott College Birmingham, Staveley Hall Derbyshire, Ayscoughfee Hall Lincolnshire, Manor Lodge Sheffield and Nevill Holt Hall Leicestershire,

== Other achievements ==
- Accredited Stained Glass Conservator with the Institute for Conservation
- He has judged the Worshipful Company of Glaziers' Stevens Competition, an award for students and artists in the early stages of their career.
