= Hubert Hughes (priest) =

Welsh Anglican priest (died 1983)

Hubert William Benjamin Hughes was a Welsh Anglican priest in the 20th century.

Hughes was educated at St David's College, Lampeter and ordained in 1939. After curacies in Hornsey and Defynnog he was a chaplain to the Forces from 1942 to 1947. When peace returned he held further curacies at Llandefalle and Llyswen. He held incumbencies at St Thomas, Swansea; St David, Llangyfelach; and St John, Morriston. He was the Archdeacon of Gower and Incumbent of St Marks Swansea from 1979 until his Death 1983.

His son was Dean of Brecon Cathedral from 1998 to 2000. Gethin Hughes his second son was bishop of San Diego
