= Graham Morgan (engineer) =

British engineer (1903–1987)

Graham Morgan CMG (12 July 1903 – 29 August 1987) was a British civil engineer who served as State Engineer of Johore and as head of Tanganiyka Public Works Department in the 1940s and 1950s.

== Early life and education ==
Morgan was born on 12 July 1903. He was educated at King Henry VIII Grammar School, Abergavenny, and University College, Cardiff where he received his BSc Civil Engineering in 1923.

== Career ==
Morgan began his career as an assistant engineer in Newport, Monmouthshire in 1924, and later that year was employed at Devon County Council.

In 1926, he went to the Federated Malay States where he was appointed Assistant Engineer. He then served in many posts as engineer in the Public Works Department of the Federated Malay States serving in Pekan, Raub, Klang, Kedah, and Kinta, and in Singapore as Assistant Resident Engineer while the Kallang aerodrome was being constructed. In 1939, he was seconded for service as Senior Executive Engineer, Malayan Public Works Department. In 1941, after the Japanese invaded the Malay Peninsula, he was evacuated from Singapore on the S.S. Kuala which was sunk by Japanese bombers off Pom Pong island, Dutch East Indies. In 1948, he was appointed State Engineer of Johore.

From 1950 to 1954, he served as Director of Public Works Department, Tanganyika before retiring.

== Personal life ==
Morgan married Alice Morgan in 1931 and they had three daughters.

== Honours ==
Morgan was appointed Companion of the Order of St Michael and St George (CMG) in the 1954 Birthday Honours.
