= Mervyn John Byers =

Australian organist

Mervyn John Byers FTCL ARCO (CHM) FRSCM (Hon) (23 March 1924 – 2 March 2011) was an Australian organist and composer.

== Background ==
He was born on 23 March 1924 in Burwood, Sydney. After five years' war service, he won a scholarship to the Sydney Conservatorium of Music. He then completed his education at the University of London.

After he retired from Selby Abbey in 1987 he moved back to Australia.

He died on 2 March 2011 in Blackheath, NSW

== Appointments ==
- Organist at Bridlington Priory 1952 - 1957
- Organist at St Andrew's Cathedral, Sydney 1957 - 1965
- Organist at Selby Abbey 1966 – 1976 and 1980 - 1987

== Recordings ==
He is well known for the recording of organ music he produced from Selby Abbey in 1969.

Cultural offices
Preceded by Kenneth Long	Organist of St Andrew's Cathedral, Sydney; 1957 - 1965	Succeeded by Michael Hemans
Preceded by David Patrick Gedge	Organist of Selby Abbey; 1966 - 1976	Succeeded by Peter Seymour
Preceded by Anthony Langford	Organist of Selby Abbey; 1980 - 1987	Succeeded by Geoffrey Pearce
