= Mary Frances Heaton =

Englishwoman (1801 - 1878) unjustly imprisoned in lunatic asylum

Mary Frances Heaton (1801-1878) was an Englishwoman who was committed to an insane asylum in 1837 for insulting an Anglican vicar and was never released.

== Life ==
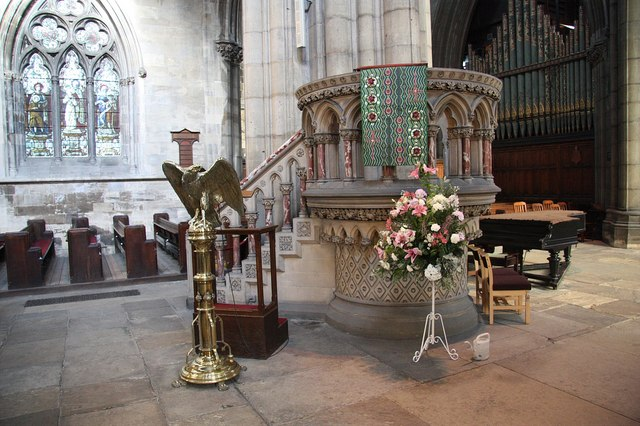
The pulpit at St George's Minster

She was born into an affluent family in Doncaster then in the West Riding of Yorkshire. Her father was made bankrupt when she was 11. She became a music teacher, living and working in London; but returned to Doncaster to care for her dying father. After his death, she resumed teaching, in Doncaster. One of her pupils was the daughter of Rev. John Sharpe, vicar of St George's Minster, Doncaster. He failed to pay for the twice-weekly lessons she had given in 1834 and 1835; and she interrupted one of his sermons, calling him "a whited sepulchre, a thief, a villain, a liar and a hypocrite".

She was taken to court, where the tribunal judged her to be "a lunatic insane and dangerous idiot", and committed her to the West Riding Pauper Lunatic Asylum in Wakefield, then in the West Riding. During her incarceration, she was subjected to a variety of what are now considered pseudo-scientific treatments, including electric shocks to the pelvis, purgatives, and the ingestion of mercury. (Note: It is unclear whether this involved the metal mercury or its compounds, or both; all are toxic.) Her medical records describe her at various times as wild, flighty, excitable, ungovernable, extravagant, violent and abusive.

Over time, her mental and physical health deteriorated. After a failed escape attempt in 1843 and with her spirit broken, she became docile and, according to local historian Sarah Cobham, "took to quietly embroidering her story [in samplers] as a way of preserving her memories". Only a few of her samplers survive; she gave many away as gifts. Towards the end of her life, she was transferred to another asylum in what is now South Yorkshire; she died, and was buried in a pauper's grave.

== Legacy ==
In 2020, a blue plaque was installed in Wakefield to commemorate the injustice she had suffered. In 2023, Heaton became the subject of a play, The Unravelling Fantasia of Miss H. by Red Gray and Sarah Nicolls, of the company Stitched-Up-Theatre. According to Lucy Brownson, the play "blends contemporary opera, physical theatre and Mary’s stitched testimonies to tell her remarkable and tragic story in her own words".
