= Edward Johnson Bellerby =

English organist, composer and teacher

Edward Johnson Bellerby LRAM (28 March 1858 – 2 April 1940) was an English organist, composer and teacher.

== Biography ==
He was born on 28 March 1858 in Pickering, Yorkshire. He studied organ under Edwin George Monk of York Minster, 1876–80, and was assistant organist for most of that time.

He graduated from New College, Oxford Mus. Bac in 1879 and Mus. Doc in 1895.

He was the father of Olympic athlete Alfred Bellerby.

== Appointments ==
- Assistant Organist at York Minster ca.1876 - 1880
- Organist to John Hotham, 5th Baron Hotham 1877 – 1878
- Organist of Selby Abbey 1878 – 1881
- Organist at St. John the Baptist, Margate, 1881 - 1884
- Organist of Holy Trinity Church Margate 1884 - 1917

== Compositions ==
He composed two hymn tunes, Lagos and Margate, and a number of choral and orchestral pieces.

Cultural offices
Preceded by tbc	Organist of Selby Abbey; 1878 - 1881	Succeeded by Frederick William Sykes
