= Paul Shackerley =

British priest (born 1956)

The Very Reverend Dr Paul Shackerley
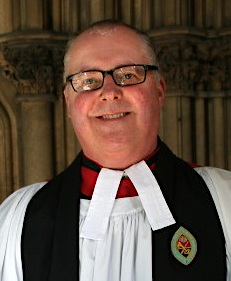
- Shackerley as Dean of Brecon, September 2014
- Title: Dean of Brecon

Personal life
- Born: 16 August 1956 (age 69) Tredegar (South Wales)
- Education: Chichester Theological College; King's College London; The University of Sheffield

Religious life
- Religion: Anglican
- Profession: Priest
- Ordination: 1993 (deacon); 1994 (priest)

Senior posting
- Predecessor: Geoffrey Marshall
- Previous post: Vicar of Doncaster Minster
- Website: paulshackerley.co.uk

Paul Shackerley (born 16 August 1956) is an Anglican priest of the Church in Wales and is the current dean of Brecon. In 2026 Paul Shackerly announced his retirement from the dean of Brecon as of the 24th May 2026.

== Education ==
Shackerley studied for ordination at Chichester Theological College from 1991 to 1993, gaining a Diploma in Theology and Ministry. In 1996 he gained a Master of Arts degree in theology from King's College London. In 2007 he completed his PhD awarded by the University of Sheffield on the role of theology and the Church of England in urban contexts, entitled "The Church in the City: Partnership and Hospitality".

== Church Army ==
Following service in the Royal Army Medical Corps, Shackerley was commissioned as a Church Army officer in 1983 and served as a parish evangelist for St Martin's Parish Church, Birmingham (1983–1986), then St Andrew's Parish Church, Kingsbury, London (1986–1991), before he began training for ordination to the priesthood in the Church of England.

== Ordained ministry ==
Shackerley was made deacon at Petertide 1993 (27 June) by David Hope, Bishop of London, at St Paul's Cathedral; and ordained priest the next Petertide (2 July 1994) by Graham Dow, Bishop of Willesden, at St Mary's Church, Ealing. He served his title parish as the curate of All Souls' Harlesden, London, from 1993 to 1996 and then became vicar of All Saints with St Michael's Parish Church, Chelmsford, from 1996 to 2002. From 2002 he was a canon residentiary and the vice-dean of Sheffield Cathedral and chair of the Cathedral Archer Project. From 2010 to 2014 he was the vicar of Doncaster Minster before taking up the post of Dean of Brecon on 13 September 2014. He is currently Chair of the Church in Wales Provincial Discernment Panel.

== Styles ==
- Paul Shackerley Esq (1956–1983)
- Captain Paul Shackerley (1983–1991)
- The Revd Father Paul Shackerley (1993–2002)
- The Revd Canon Paul Shackerley (2002–2007)
- The Revd Canon Dr Paul Shackerley (2007–2014)
- The Very Revd Dr Paul Shackerley (2014–present)

Church in Wales titles
Preceded by Geoffrey Marshall	Dean of Brecon Cathedral; 2014-present	Incumbent
