= Henry Oswald Hodgson =

British composer (1886–1975)

Henry Oswald Hodgson FRCO (6 November 1886 - 21 August 1975) was an organist and composer based in England.

== Biography ==
He was born on 6 November 1886 in Scawby, Lincolnshire, the son of Annie Ellen née Conran (1846–1930) and Revd. Samuel Edward Hodgson (1843–1905).

He studied organ at Lincoln Cathedral under George Bennett until 1914.

He married Rosamund Jocelyn Orde née Mangin (1894-1975) in 1916 in Ripon. They had one daughter Susette Mangin Hodgson (1917-2000).

== Appointments ==
- Organist of St Andrew's Church, Boothby Pagnall ???? - 1908
- Organist of St. Nicholas' Church, Lincoln ???? - 1911
- Organist of St. Peter at Arches, Lincoln 1911 - 1914
- Organist of St. Michael's Church, Alnwick 1914 - 1920
- Organist of Selby Abbey 1920 - 1921
- Organist of All Saints' Church, Leighton Buzzard 1921 - 1928
- Organist of St Mary's Church, Nottingham 1928 - 1954

== Compositions ==
He composed:

- Magnificat and Nunc Dimittis in C
- Fantasia on a Christmas Theme
- Communion Setting in F
- Great is the Lord Jehovah
- Grant to us, Lord.

Cultural offices
| Preceded by Frederick William Sykes | Organist of Selby Abbey; 1919-1921 | Succeeded by Walter Hartley |
| Preceded by Vernon Sydney Read | Organist and Choirmaster of St. Mary's Church, Nottingham; 1928-1954 | Succeeded by David Lumsden |
