= Frederick William Sykes =

English organist and composer (1862-1932)

Frederick William Sykes FRCO (1862 – 30 October 1932) was an organist and composer based in England.

== Life ==
He was born in 1862, the son of Matthew Skyes and Mary Crowther.

He studied organ under Dr. William Spark, the Leeds Borough Organist, and succeeded Edward Johnson Bellerby after a competition to elect his successor.

He married Margaret Richardson Wilson in 1884 and had two children:

- Evelyn Hilda Sykes 1886 - 1969
- Bertha Sykes 1889

== Appointments ==
- Organist of St. Peter's Church, Morley, ???? - 1881
- Organist of Selby Abbey 1881 - 1919

== Compositions ==
He composed music for organ and choir

Cultural offices
Preceded by Edward Johnson Bellerby	Organist of Selby Abbey; 1881-1919	Succeeded by Henry Oswald Hodgson
