= Gwynno James =

British clergy (1912–1967)

John Gwynno James (7 September 1912 – 18 February 1967) was a Church in Wales cleric, who served as Archdeacon of Llandaff (until 1964) and subsequently as Dean of Brecon (from 1964).

He earned his education at Keble College, Oxford, and was ordained in 1937. Warden of St Teilo's Hall from 1940 to 1945 he was then a Lecturer at St Michael's College, Llandaff, and after that a Minor Canon at Llandaff Cathedral.

He is also a published author (by the Church in Wales) and a librettist for such classical works as William Mathias' St. Teilo Masque (1962) and Alun Hoddinott's Dives and Lazarus. Mathias dedicated his work, Aedes Christi, to Gwynno James on James' installation at Brecon.

Church in Wales titles
Preceded by William Edward Jones	Dean of Brecon Cathedral; 1964 – 1967	Succeeded by William Ungoed Jacob
