= Geoffrey Marshall (priest) =

British clergy

Geoffrey Osborne Marshall (born 5 January 1948 in Rossett) is the former Dean of Brecon.

Marshall was educated at Repton School and Durham University; and was ordained after a period of study at the College of the Resurrection, Mirfield. After curacies in Waltham Cross and Welwyn Garden City he held incumbencies in Derbyshire before becoming the Canon Missioner at Derby Cathedral. He was Area Dean of Wrexham from 2002 to 2008.

Church in Wales titles
| Preceded by John Davies | Dean of Brecon Cathedral; 2008-2014 | Succeeded by Paul Shackerley |
