= Alfred Bellerby =

British athlete (1888–1979)

Personal information
- Nationality: British (English)
- Born: 26 January 1888 Margate, Kent, England
- Died: 10 April 1979 (aged 91) Haslemere, Surrey, England

Sport
- Sport: Athletics
- Events: Long jump High jump
- Club: University of Cambridge AC; Achilles Club

Rev. Alfred Courthope Benson Bellerby (26 January 1888 – 10 April 1979) was a British athlete and educator who competed at the 1908 Summer Olympics.

== Biography ==
He was the son of organist Edward Johnson Bellerby and was educated at St Lawrence College, Ramsgate, Emmanuel College, Cambridge and Ridley Hall, Cambridge.

Bellerby represented Great Britain at the 1908 Summer Olympics in London, where he competed in the men's long jump and the men's high jump at the 1908 Summer Olympics.

He was an Army chaplain during World War I and was headmaster of King Edward's School, Witley, (1926–1951) and Governor of St Lawrence College, Ramsgate.
