= Doncaster Minster =

Minster Church in Doncaster, England

- The Minster and Parish Church of St George, Doncaster
- St George's Minster, Doncaster
- Doncaster Minster
- 53°31′32.88″N 1°8′7.44″W
- OS grid reference: SE 5742 0356
- Location: 9 Church Street, Doncaster, South Yorkshire DN1 1RD
- Country: England
- Denomination: Church of England
- Churchmanship: Broad Church
- Website: doncasterminster.org

History
- Dedication: St George
- Consecrated: 14 October 1858

Architecture
- Functional status: Active
- Heritage designation: Grade I listed
- Designated: 12 June 1950
- Architect: George Gilbert Scott
- Architectural type: Gothic Revival
- Style: Gothic Revival
- Groundbreaking: 1854
- Completed: 1858
- Construction cost: £48,000

Specifications
- Length: 169 feet (52 m)
- Width: 91 feet (28 m)
- Height: 170 feet (52 m)

Administration
- Province: Province of York
- Diocese: Diocese of Sheffield
- Archdeaconry: Doncaster
- Deanery: Doncaster
- Parish: St George Doncaster

Clergy
- Vicar: The Revd David Stevens

Doncaster Minster, formally the Minster and Parish Church of St George, is the Anglican minster church of Doncaster, South Yorkshire, England. It is a grade I listed building and was designed by architect designer George Gilbert Scott. The church was built in 1854–1858 to replace an earlier building destroyed by fire. It is an active place of worship, and has a Schulze organ, a ring of eight bells, and a celebrated clock by Dent. The church is one of two parish churches to have minster status in South Yorkshire. The other is the minster church of Rotherham.

Pevsner described the church as being the most "cathedral-like" of all of Scott's parish churches.

== History ==
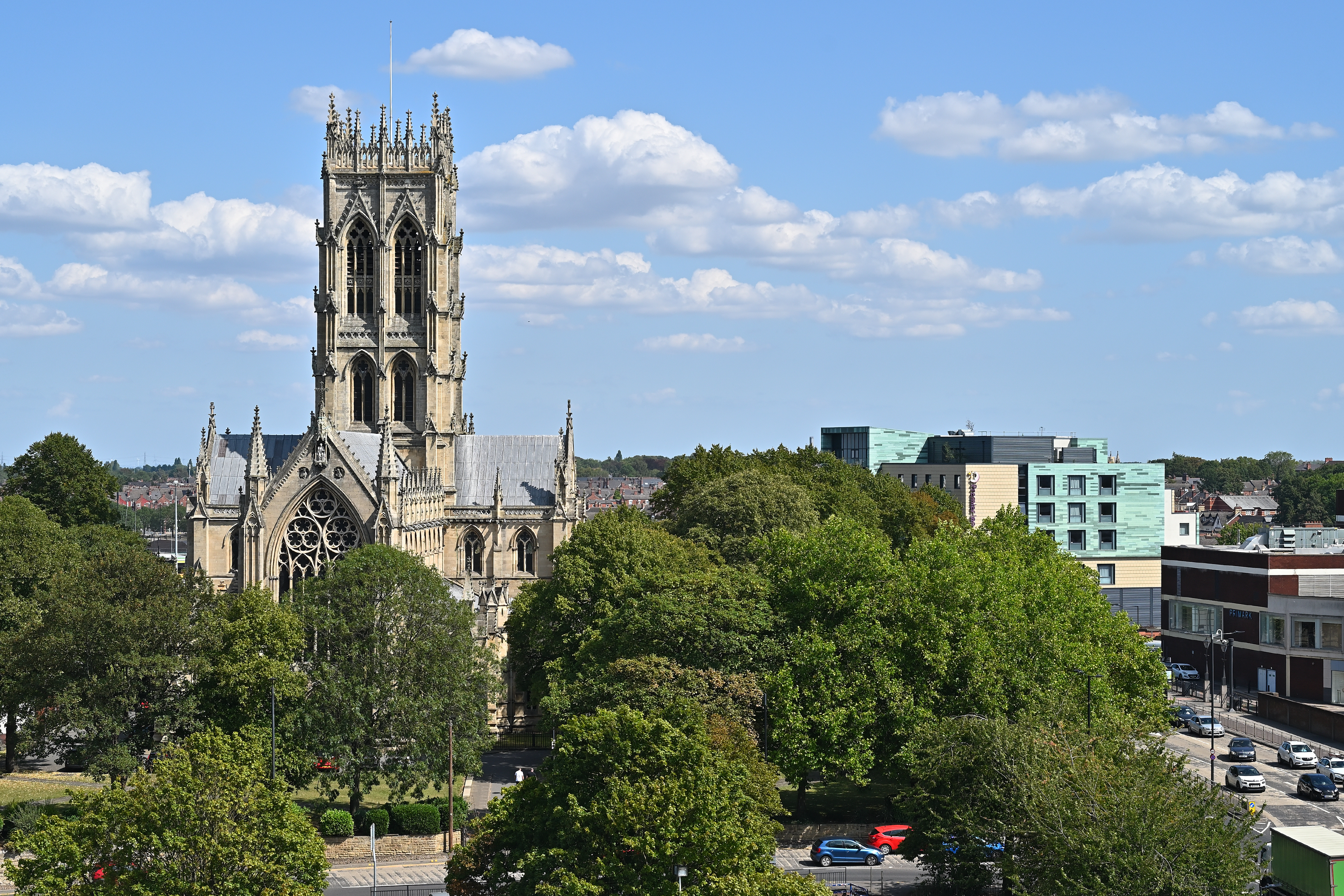
Doncaster Minster

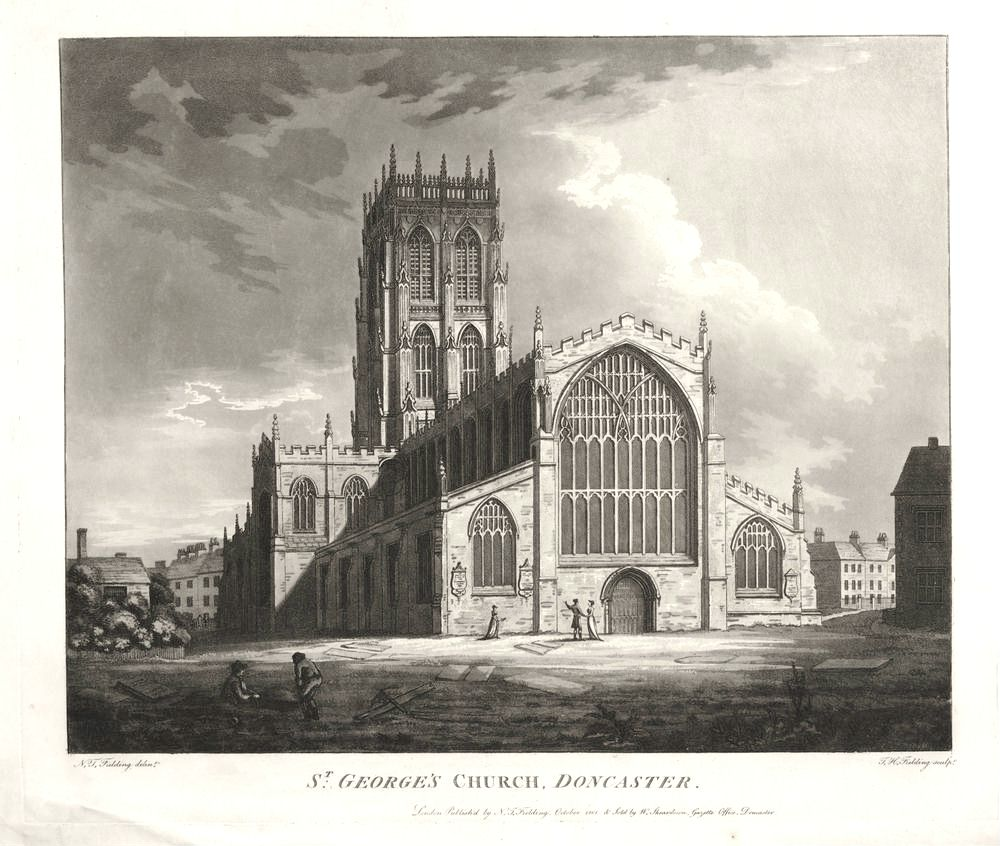
Doncaster Minster as it appeared prior to 1853.

The original medieval building burned down on the last day of February 1853. This fire resulted in the loss of the medieval library which was above the south porch. The old church had some Norman remnants left over in the walls from the church previous to that, which also burnt down at the start of the 13th century.

The current building was designed by architect Sir George Gilbert Scott in 1853, and the foundation stone was laid by the Archbishop of York Thomas Musgrave on 24 February 1854. Construction took between 1854 and 1858 at a cost of £43,126 4s 5d. It was consecrated by the Archbishop of York on 14 October 1858. Nikolaus Pevsner described the church as the "..proudest and most cathedral-like of this fabulously busy and successful architect's parish churches." The church is laid out like a "massive cruciform" and has a central Perpendicular tower which reaches 170 feet (52 m); the rest of the church is in the Decorated style. The church extends to 169 feet (52 m) in length and is 65 feet (20 m) wide in the nave including the aisles.

A time capsule was placed underneath the church containing documents, coins and other artefacts of the time. A vellum sheet was included with the names of various benefactors, the churchwardens and the clergy.

One of the quirks of the old church that was carried on into the new building, was the ringing of the church bells during St Leger race at Doncaster Racecourse. The Reverend Vaughan ceased this tradition in the first year that the race was held during his tenure by locking the tower and going for a walk.

== The Minster today ==
The Minster is one of Doncaster's most architecturally important buildings evidenced by its Grade I listing and was described by Sir John Betjeman as "Victorian Gothic at its very best". It was given minster status as the Minster and Parish Church of St George by the Bishop of Sheffield on 17 June 2004. It is an active place of worship with regular services and is also used for civic services, arts events and other celebrations. The Minster is a member of the Major Churches Network, successor to the Greater Churches Network.

Amongst its treasures are a clock by Dent (the designer of the Palace of Westminster Clock, more usually known as Big Ben) and a spectacular five-manual organ by the renowned German organ builder Edmund Schulze (1824–1877).

The minster has eight bells with a tenor of 29 long cwt 2 qr 17 lb (3,321 lb or 1,506 kg). The tower was repaired between 1925 and 1926 at a cost of £2,000, allowing the bells to ring again after being silent for a year.

== Vicars ==
- John Sharpe: 1817 to 1860
- Charles John Vaughan: 1860 to 1869
- Francis Pigou: 1869 to 1875
- Edward Carr Glyn: 1875 to 1878
- Charles Sisum Wright: 1878 to 1886
- Henry Tebbutt: 1886 to 1894
- John Nathaniel Quirk: 1901 to 1905
- F.G. Sandford: 1905 to 1928
- Richard Brook: 1928 to 1935
- Michael James Jackson: 1969 to 1973
- Geoffrey Lawn: 1974 to 1982
- John Bird: 1982 to 1985
- Christopher Smith: 2002 to 2010
- Paul Shackerley: 2010 to 2014
- David Stevens: 2015 to 2024

== Organs and organists ==
=== Organists and choirmasters ===
- 1740 (11 January) William Tireman
- 1741 John Maddock
- 1755 John Camidge
- 1756 Edward Miller
- 1807 Isaac Brailsford
- 1835 Jeremiah Rogers
- 1879 Robert M. Rogers (son of the above)
- 1904 Wilfred Ernest Sanderson (formerly organist of St. James' Church, West Hampstead)
- 1923 Harold Aubie Bennett
- 1930 Percy Saunders
- 1946 Owen Le Patourel Franklin
- 1957 Magnus Black (Relief organist Brian Steele)
- 1995 Joseph Sentance
- 2003 Andrew V. Wilson
- 2009 Darren Williams

=== 1862 Schulze Organ ===
==== Rising from the ashes ====
The medieval Parish Church of St George possessed a fine Harris organ of 1739–40. This instrument was praised by John Stanley, who declared "every pipe in the reed stops to be worth its weight in silver". It grew from an original specification of some 24 stops to one of 51 stops and was reputed to be the largest organ in England except for York Minster, due to the efforts of Jeremiah Rogers (organist 1835–1879), who paid for much of the work himself. The organ had just been relocated from the west gallery to the chancel and its pedal extended to 32 ft pitch, when it was consumed by fire, along with the entire building, on 28 February 1853.

The leading architect of the day, Sir George Gilbert Scott, was commissioned to rebuild the church, a task which he completed in only four years. Consecrated in 1858, the new church is the most cathedral-like of Scott's parish churches and is crowned by a bell tower 170 feet high.

Jeremiah Rogers was desirous of commissioning an organ worthy of Scott's new church and set out to acquire "the best organ that could be obtained anywhere in the world". Rogers made many visits around Europe inspecting famous organs, often in the company of his friend E. J. Hopkins (organist of the Temple Church).

=== Specification ===
The organ contains 93 speaking stops, five manuals, eight pedals, 12 combination pistons and eight combination pedals, detailed as follows;

I Choir
1	Lieblich Bourdon	16
2	Geigen Principal	8
3	Viol de Gamba	8
4	Flauto Gamba 2 ranks	8
5	Gemshorn	8
6	Salicional	8
7	Flauto Traverso	8
8	Lieblich Gedackt	8
9	Flauto Traverso	4
10	Lieblich Flute	4
11	Geigen Principal	4
12	Quintaten	4
13	Flautina	2

II Great
14	Sub Bass (c)	32
15	Double Open Diap.	16
16	Bourdon	16
17	Open Diapason No. 1	8
18	Open Diapason No. 2	8
19	Stopped Diapason	8
20	Hohl Flute	8
21	Stopped Flute	4
22	Principal	4
23	Gemshorn	4
24	Quint	5 1/3
25	Twelfth	2 2/3
26	Fifteenth	2
27	Mixture	V
28	Cymbal	III-V
29	Cornet (c)	IV
30	Double Trumpet	16
31	Posaune	8
32	Trumpet	8
33	Clarion	4

III Swell (enclosed)
34	Bourdon	16
35	Open Diapason	8
36	Terpodian	8
37	Echo Gamba	8*
38	Voix Celeste (c)	8*
39	Harmonic Flute	8
40	Rohr Flute	8
41	Harmonic Flute	4
42	Stopped Flute	4
43	Principal	4
44	Viol d'Amour	4
45	Mixture	V
46	Scharf	III
47	Cornet	IV
48	Double Bassoon	16
49	Trumpet	8
50	Horn	8
51	Hautboy	8
52	Clarion	4
53	Vox Humana	8
	Tremulant	

IV Solo (enclosed)
54	String Gamba	8*
55	Harm. Claribel Flute	8*
56	Concert Flute	4*
57	Clarinet	8
58	Orchestral Oboe	8*
	Tremulant	
59	Tuba (unenclosed)	8*

V Echo
60	Tibia Major	16
61	Harmonica	8
62	Vox Angelica	8
63	Flauto Amabile	8
64	Flauto Traverso	8
65	Celestina	4
66	Flauto Dolcissimo	4
67	Harmonic Ætheria	II

Pedal
68	Sub Principal	32
69	Major Bass	16
70	Principal Bass	16
71	Open Bass	16
72	Violone	16
73	Sub Bass	16
74	Major Bass	8
75	Flute Bass	8
76	Violoncello	8
77	Octave Bass	8
78	Quint Bass	10 2/3
79	Great Tierce	6 2/5
80	Quint	5 1/3
81	Fifteenth Bass	4
82	Tierce	3 1/5
83	Mixture	II
84	Cymbal	II
85	Contra Posaune	32
86	Posaune	16
87	Bombarde	16
88	Contra Fagotto	16
89	Trumpet	8
90	Horn	8
91	Fagotto	8
92	Clarion	4

Couplers
Solo to Pedal
Swell to Pedal
Choir to Pedal
Great to Pedal
Solo to Choir
Swell to Choir
Solo to Great
Swell to Great
Choir to Great

== Gallery ==
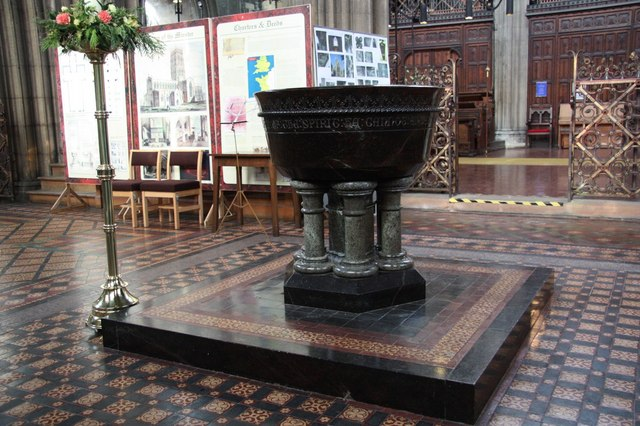
The font

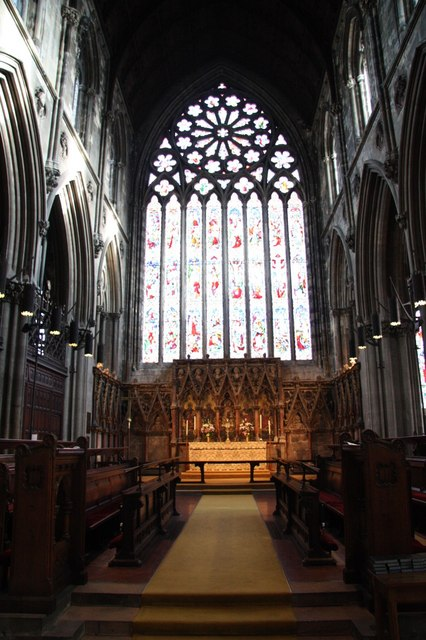
The chancel

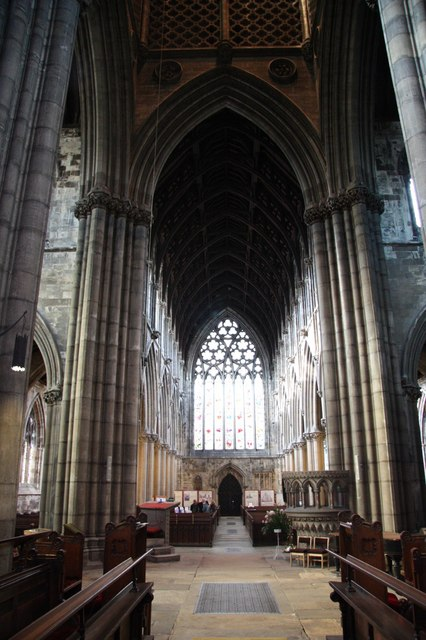
The nave

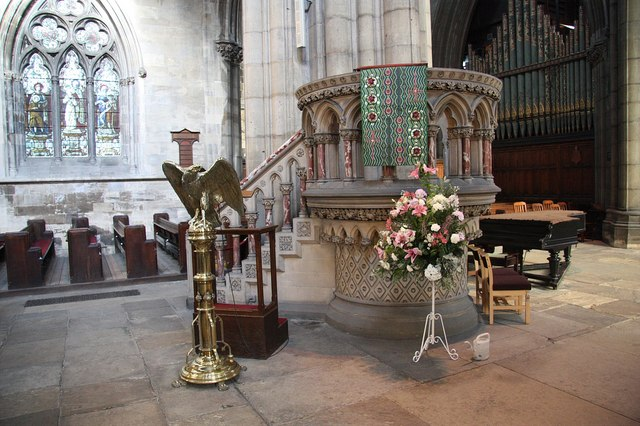
The pulpit

== See also ==
- Grade I listed buildings in South Yorkshire
- Listed buildings in Doncaster (Town Ward)
- List of new churches by George Gilbert Scott in Northern England
- Mary Frances Heaton (1801–1878), who insulted Rev. John Sharpe, for which she was in 1837 committed to an insane asylum and never released
