= David Gwerfyl Davies =

Welsh organist and composer

David Gwerfyl Davies (1 February 1913 – 1977) was a Welsh organist and composer.

== Background ==
He was born on 1 February 1913. He was a pupil at Merthyr Tydfil County Grammar School and then University College, Cardiff. He was awarded his BA in music in 1937. After the Second World War he took the degree of Mus.B. at Trinity College, Cambridge and graduated in 1954.

== Appointments ==
- Organist at St Nicolas' Church, Kings Norton 1950 - 1953
- Organist at Brecon Cathedral 1956 – 1963

== Compositions ==
He composed church and organ music.

Cultural offices
Preceded by John Humphrey Carden	Organist of Brecon Cathedral; 1956 - 1963	Succeeded by Michael Bryan Hesford
