= Michael Bryan Hesford =

British composer and organist

Dr. (Michael) Bryan Hesford (19 July 1930 - 19 March 1996) was an organist and composer based in England. In addition to the standard repertoire, he is remembered for performances and commissioning of new works for organ, including the Prelude, Scherzo and Passacaglia (1963) by Kenneth Leighton.

== Life ==
He was born on 19 July 1930 in Eccles, Lancashire.

He studied organ under Marcel Dupré and Max Drischner.

== Appointments ==
- Assistant organist of Newcastle Cathedral 1959 - 1960
- Organist of Wymondham Abbey 1960 - 1963
- Organist of Brecon Cathedral 1963 - 1966
- Organist of St. Margaret's Priory and Parish Church, King's Lynn 1966 - ????
- Organist of St Mary's Church, Melton Mowbray 1973 - 1978
- Organist of the Church of St John the Baptist, Frome 1986
- Organist of St. Nicholas' Collegiate Church Galway 1986 - 1995

== Compositions ==
He has composed 3 communion services for Southwark Cathedral, and other music.

Cultural offices
Preceded by N. Charleton-Burdon	Organist of Wymondham Abbey; 1960 - 1963	Succeeded by Norman Crowhurst
Preceded by David Gwerfyl Davies	Organist of Brecon Cathedral; 1963 - 1966	Succeeded by David Patrick Gedge
Preceded by Eric Bennett	Organist of St Mary's Church, Melton Mowbray; 1973 - 1978	Succeeded by Ian Major
