= Edward Roberts (priest) =

British priest (1877–1968)

Edward Albert Trevillian Roberts (10 October 1877 – 2 May 1968) was an Anglican priest.

He was educated at Llandovery College and Jesus College, Oxford and ordained in 1901. After curacies in Neath and Cwmbach he was Rector of Llanelly until 1925 when he began a long association with Brecon Cathedral. He was Canon and Sub-Dean until 1939 and then Dean for a further decade. He resigned in 1949 and died on .
