= King Henry VIII Grammar School =

Historic school in Abergavenny, Wales

Information
- Motto: Ut Prosim (That I may be of service)
- Established: 1542
- Closed: 1963 (became King Henry VIII School)
- Gender: Boys
- Houses: Oppidan and Rustican
- Colors: Red and blue

King Henry VIII Grammar School, Abergavenny, Monmouthshire, was one of a series of schools founded during the Reformation in England and Wales in 1542 from property seized from monasteries and religious congregations. In this case, a school that had been associated with the local Priory Church was administered by the (now Protestant) state instead.

The school provided free education to boys in the local area who passed an entrance examination. The school motto was "Ut Prosim" ("That I may be of service") and the school colours were red and blue. The school was divided into two houses, Oppidan and Rustican, from the Latin for Town and Country.

The school was merged with the local Girls' High School in 1963 and later became a comprehensive school when selection at 11 was abolished. The school is now operating as King Henry VIII School Abergavenny.

A former pupil of the school, David Lewis, was the first Principal of Jesus College, Oxford. Amongst other distinguished pupils, well-known writer and critic Raymond Williams gave a fictionalised account of his time there in the novel "Border Country".
