= David Patrick Gedge =

British organist and music teacher (1939–2016)

David Patrick Gedge MBE FRAM FRSCM HonFGCM GRSM FRCO LRAM (12 March 1939 – 2 July 2016) was an organist based in England and Wales.

== Life ==
David Gedge was the son of Arthur (Paul) Johnson Gedge 1903–1968 and Gwendoline (Wendy) Middleton 1908–1955. Paul Gedge was a parish priest, lastly in Southwark / Lambeth and an author; a friend of Eric Crozier and the influence to the character Mr. Gedge in Benjamin Britten's opera Albert Herring. On David's mother's side, he was a great-nephew to the organist Hubert Stanley Middleton.

He was a chorister in Southwark Cathedral from 1947 to 1962, and educated in St Olave's Grammar School in London, the Royal Academy of Music, and the University of London. He was awarded the Turpin Prize in 1962 when he achieved his FRCO. He was made a MBE in 1993, and received the Archbishop of Wales award for church music in 1997.

From 1966 to 2007, David Gedge was the organist and choirmaster at Brecon Cathedral.

Gedge wrote two volumes of memoirs, A Country Cathedral Organist Looks Back (2005) and More From a Country Cathedral Organist (2008). Both autobiographies were self-published and received mixed reviews. He died on 2 July 2016.

== Sexual assault allegation ==
In 2025, the BBC reported an allegation that Gedge had assaulted a 17-year-old female chorister from Brecon during a 2001 trip to Ireland, when he was 62. The incident was reported to the church in 2003.

== Appointments ==
- Organist of St. Mary the Virgin, Primrose Hill, London 1957–1962
- Organist of Selby Abbey 1962–1966
- Director of Music at Brecon Cathedral 1966–2007, where his wife Hazel held the position of Assistant Organist.

Cultural offices
Preceded by Walter Hartley	Organist of Selby Abbey; 1962–1966	Succeeded by Mervyn John Byers
Preceded by Michael Bryan Hesford	Organist of Brecon Cathedral; 1966–2007	Succeeded by Mark Duthie
