= Huw Jones (bishop) =

British bishop (1934–2016)

The Right Reverend Huw Jones
- Bishop of St David's
- Church: Church in Wales
- Diocese: St David's
- Installed: 1996
- Term ended: 2001
- Predecessor: Ivor Rees
- Successor: Carl Cooper
- Other posts: Assistant Bishop of St Asaph (1991–1996); Dean of Brecon Cathedral (1981–1996)

Orders
- Ordination: 1959
- Consecration: 1991

Personal details
- Born: David Huw Jones; 1 July 1934
- Died: 18 October 2016 (aged 82)
- Denomination: Anglicanism
- Spouse: Gwyneth Jones
- Children: 2

David Huw Jones (1 July 1934 – 18 October 2016) was a Welsh Anglican bishop who served as the Bishop of St. David's from 1996 to 2001.

== Early life and education ==
Jones was born on 1 July 1934. He was educated at Pontardawe Grammar School, a state school in the Swansea Valley. He studied at the University College of North Wales, Bangor, graduating with a Bachelor of Arts (BA) degree in 1955, and at University College, Oxford, graduating with a further BA in 1958. As per tradition, his Oxford BA was promoted to a Master of Arts (MA Oxon) degree in 1962. From 1958 to 1959, he trained for ordination at St Michael's College, Llandaff.

== Ordained ministry ==
Jones was ordained in the Church in Wales as a deacon in 1959 and as a priest in 1960. His first pastoral appointment was as a curate at Aberdare from 1959 to 1961, followed by the curate of St Catherine's, Neath from 1961 to 1965, Vicar of Crynant from 1965 to 1969, then the Vicar of Cwmafan (Cwmavon)(Michaelston-Super-Avon) from 1969 to 1973. His next appointment was as the Sub-Warden of St Michael's College, Llandaff from 1974 to 1978. He also became a Lecturer in the Faculty of Theology at the University College of South Wales and Monmouthshire from 1974 to 1978; becoming Assistant Dean of Faculty from 1977 to 1978. He became a Diocesan Ecumenical Officer in 1979. He was appointed Dean of Brecon Cathedral and Vicar of Brecon, St Mary and Battle with Llanddew, in 1982, where he served until 1993.

=== Episcopal ministry ===
He was consecrated an Assistant Bishop of St Asaph in 1993. He was elected Bishop of St Davids in December 1995 and enthroned at St Davids Cathedral on 24 February 1996. He retired at the end of 2001.

He died on 18 October 2016.
