= Brecon Cathedral =

- Cathedral Church of St John the Evangelist
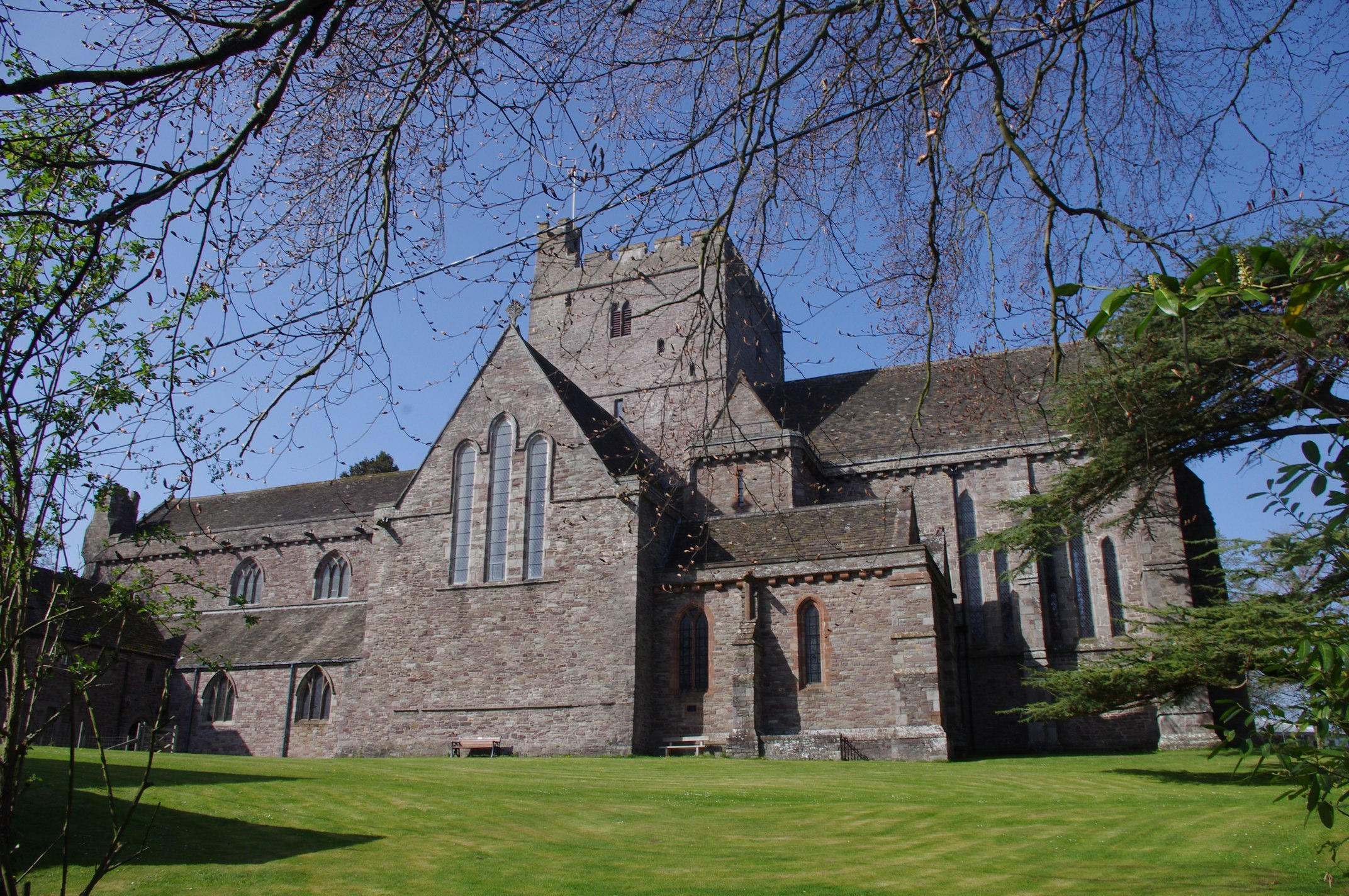
- Brecon Cathedral
- Brecon Cathedral
- 51°57′04″N 3°23′31″W
- Location: Brecon
- Country: Wales
- Denomination: Church in Wales
- Previous denomination: Catholic
- Website: https://www.breconcathedral.org.uk/

History
- Dedication: John the Evangelist

Architecture
- Heritage designation: Grade I listed building
- Designated: 16 January 1952

Administration
- Province: Church in Wales
- Diocese: Diocese of Swansea and Brecon

Clergy
- Bishop: Bishop of Swansea and Brecon

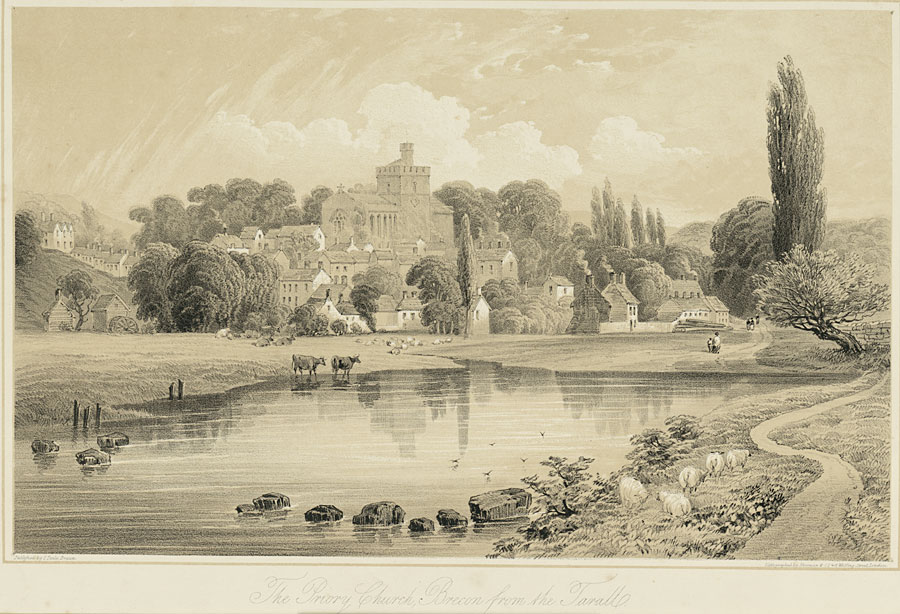
Priory Church, Brecon (c.1865)

Brecon Cathedral (Welsh: Eglwys Gadeiriol Aberhonddu), in the town of Brecon, Powys, is the cathedral of the Diocese of Swansea and Brecon in the Church in Wales and seat of the Bishop of Swansea and Brecon. Previously the church of Brecon Priory and then the Parish Church of St John the Evangelist, it became Brecon Cathedral following the disestablishment of the Church in Wales in 1920 and the creation of the diocese in 1923.

== History ==
Because of the characteristic round shape of its churchyard, the cathedral is thought to be on the site of an earlier Celtic church, of which no trace remains. A new church, dedicated to St. John, was built on the orders of Bernard de Neufmarché, the Norman knight who conquered the kingdom of Brycheiniog in 1093. He gave the church to one of his followers, Roger, a monk from Battle Abbey, who founded a priory on the site as a daughter house of Battle. The first prior at Brecon was Walter, another monk from Battle. Bernard de Neufmarché also endowed the priory with lands, rights and tithes from the surrounding area, and, after his death, it passed to the Earls of Hereford, so giving it greater prosperity. The church was rebuilt and extended in the Gothic style in about 1215, during the reign of King John. In the Middle Ages, the church was known as the church of Holy Rood or Holy Cross, because it owned a great "golden rood" which was an object of pilgrimage and veneration until it was destroyed in the Dissolution of the Monasteries in the 16th century. The smoke-blackened roof of its hall was built between 1237 and 1267.

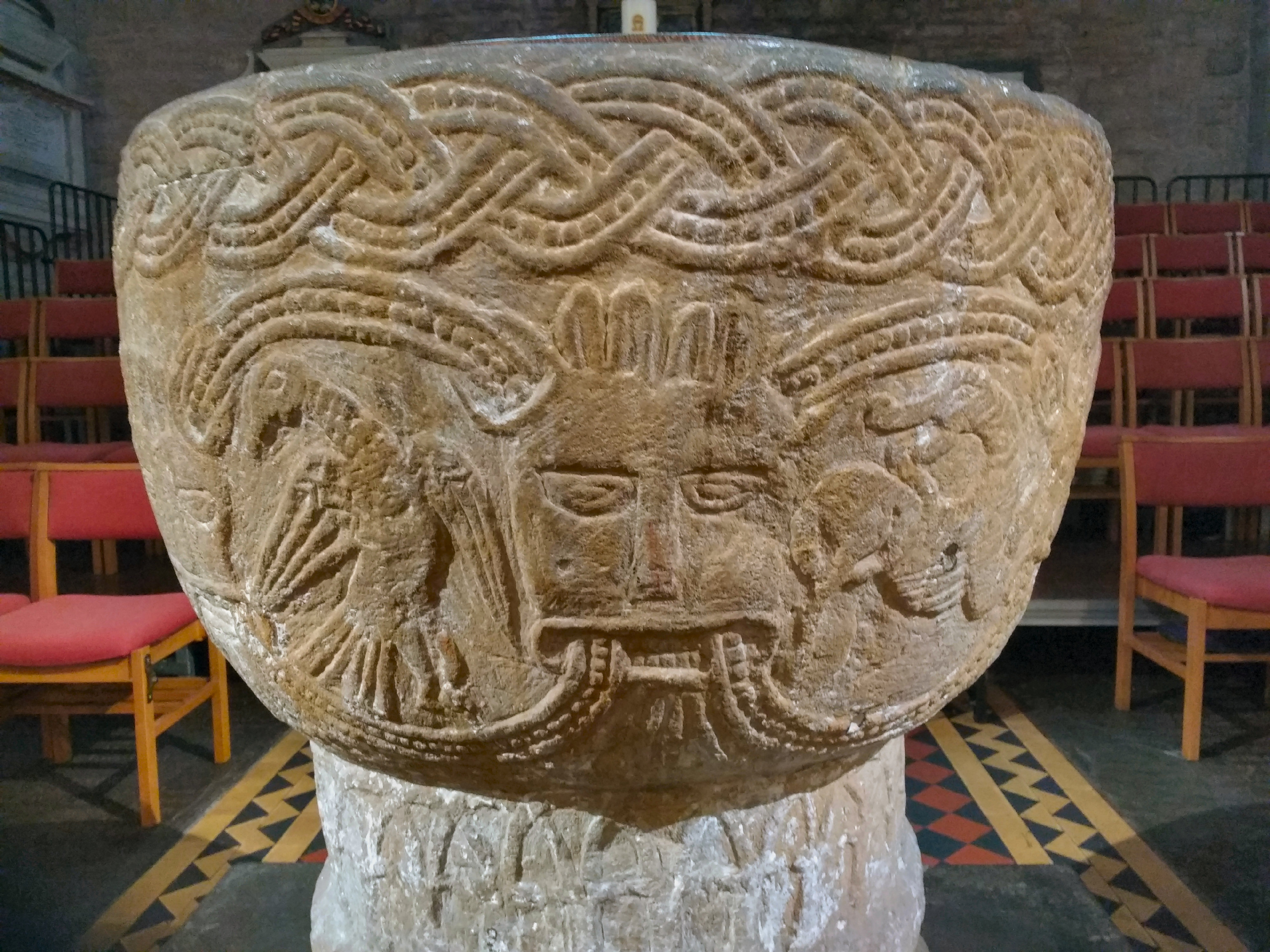
Font with Green Man and Tree of Life

In 1538 the Prior was pensioned off, and the priory church became the parish church. Some of the surrounding buildings were adapted for secular use; and others, such as the cloisters, were left to decay and later demolished. By the 19th century, the church was in poor repair and only the nave was in use. Some restoration took place in 1836, but major renovation of the church did not start until the 1860s. The tower was strengthened in 1914.

The cathedral is a Grade I listed building.

In recent years, some of the buildings in the cathedral close have been converted into a diocesan centre, a heritage centre and exhibition, as well as a shop and "the Hours" restaurant.

Charles Lumley (1824–1858), awarded the Victoria Cross during the Crimean War, was buried in the cathedral churchyard.

== Deans of Brecon ==
The new Dean, announced in June 2026 is Adrian Morgan.

- From the diocese's erection until 1939, the bishop was ex-officio dean; Roberts was Sub-Dean.
- 1939–1949 (ret.): Edward Roberts, Vicar of Brecon
- 1950–1964 (res.): William Jones, Vicar of St Mary's, Brecon
- 1964–18 February 1967 (d.): Gwynno James, Vicar of St Mary's, Brecon and Battle
- 1967–1978 (ret.): Ungoed Jacob, Vicar of St Mary's, Brecon and Battle
- 1979–1982 (res.): Alwyn Rice Jones (became Bishop of St Asaph; later Archbishop of Wales)
- 1982–1993 (res.): Huw Jones, Vicar of Brecon, Battle and Llanddew (became assistant bishop in Diocese of St Asaph; later Bishop of St Davids)
- 1993–1998 (ret.): John Harris, Vicar of Brecon with Battle and Llanddew
- 1998–2000 (ret.): Geraint Hughes
- 2000–2008 (res.): John Davies (became Bishop of Swansea and Brecon)
- 2008–2014 (ret.): Geoffrey Marshall
- 2014–2026: Paul Shackerley
- 2026-present: Dr Adrian Morgan

== Organists ==
A specification of the pipe organ can be found on the National Pipe Organ Register.

=== Organists ===
- 1923 John Humphrey Carden
- 1956 David Gwerfyl Davies (formerly organist of The Church of St. Nicholas, Kings Norton)
- 1963 Michael Bryan Hesford (later organist of St Mary's Church, Melton Mowbray)
- 1966 David Patrick Gedge
- 2007 Mark Duthie
- 2017 Stephen Power
- 2025 David Stevens (formerly Organist and Master of the Choristers, Belfast Cathedral, and Director of Music, All Saints, Hove)

== Bells ==
There are 10 bells, rung in the traditional full-circle manner of ringing, the tenor weight being 16 cwt.
