= Geraint Hughes =

British clergyman (born 1934)

Geraint Morgan Hugh Hughes (born 21 November 1934) is a retired Anglican Priest.

He was born into an ecclesiastical family, the son of The Ven. Hubert Hughes (priest), sometime Archdeacon of Gower. and educated at Brecon Grammar School, Keble College, Oxford, and St. Michael's College, Llandaff. After National Service in the RAF he was ordained in 1959. He served curacies at Gorseinon and Oystermouth; and then held incumbencies at Llanbadarn Fawr and Llandrindod. He was a Canon at Brecon Cathedral from 1989 to 1998 when he became its Dean, a post he held for two years.

Church in Wales titles
Preceded by John Harris	Dean of Brecon Cathedral; 1998– 2000	Succeeded by John David Edward Davies
