= Walter Hartley (organist) =

English organist and composer

Walter Hartley (1 December 1879 – 21 April 1969) was an English organist and composer based in Leeds.

== Life ==
He was born in Leeds in 1879. He was educated at Durham University.

Walter married Alice Lillian Wilson, the daughter of Robert Kirby Wilson, on 31 July 1902 in the Brunswick Chapel, Leeds. They had two children:

- George Wilson Hartley (b. 1903)
- Constance Hartley (b. 1905)

== Appointments ==
- Organist of Providence Chapel, Leeds 1895–1897
- Organist of St. Peter's Church, Leeds, 1897–1900
- Organist of Queen Street Congregational Church 1900–1909
- Organist of Roscoe Wesleyan Church, Leeds 1909–1914
- Organist of St. Mark's Church, Leeds 1914–1921
- Organist of Selby Abbey 1922 - 1962

== Compositions ==
He composed:

- Magnificat and Nunc Dimittis in B flat
- Magnificat and Nunc Dimittis in G
- Benedicite in F

Cultural offices
Preceded by Herbert Hill	Organist of Selby Abbey; 1922 - 1962	Succeeded by David Patrick Gedge
