= Selby Abbey =

Anglican church in Selby, North Yorkshire, England

Coordinates: 53°47′04″N 1°04′05″W

- The West and South fronts
- Selby Abbey
- OS grid reference: SE615323
- Country: England
- Denomination: Church of England
- Previous denomination: Roman Catholic
- Churchmanship: Broad Church
- Website: www.selbyabbey.org.uk/

History
- Status: Parish church
- Founded: 1069; 957 years ago
- Founder: Benedict of Auxerre
- Dedication: St Mary the Virgin and St Germain

Architecture
- Functional status: Active
- Heritage designation: Grade I
- Designated: 16 December 1952
- Style: Romanesque, Decorated Gothic, Gothic Revival
- Years built: 1069–1465

Administration
- Province: York
- Diocese: York
- Archdeaconry: York
- Deanery: Selby
- Parish: Selby

Clergy
- Vicar: The Revd Canon John Weetman

Selby Abbey is a former Benedictine abbey and current Anglican parish church in the town of Selby, North Yorkshire, England. It is a member of the Major Churches Network in England.

== Monastic history ==
The church is one of the few surviving abbey churches of the medieval period and one of the largest. It was founded by Benedict of Auxerre in 1069 and subsequently built by the de Lacy family.

On 31 May 1256, the abbey was bestowed with the grant of a mitre by Pope Alexander IV and from this date was a "Mitred Abbey". This privilege fell into abeyance a number of times, but on 11 April 1308, Archbishop William Greenfield confirmed the grant, and Selby remained a "Mitred Abbey" until the Dissolution of the Monasteries.

Archbishop Walter Giffard visited the monastery in 1275 by commission, and several monks and the abbot were charged with a list of faults including loose living: many complaints referred to misconduct with married women. In 1279 Archbishop William de Wickwane made a visitation, and found fault with the abbot as he did not observe the Rule of Saint Benedict, was not singing mass, preaching or teaching, and was seldom attending chapter. Things had not improved much in 1306 when Archbishop William Greenfield visited, and similar visitations in later years resulted in similar findings.

The choir in 2026

The Nave

The community rebuilt the choir in the early 14th century, but in 1340 a fire destroyed the chapter house, dormitory, treasury and part of the church. The damage was repaired and the decorated windows in the south aisle of the nave were installed.

In 1380–1 there were the abbot and twenty-five monks. In 1393 Pope Boniface IX granted an indulgence to pilgrims who contributed to the conservation of the chapel of the Holy Cross in the abbey.

The 15th century saw more alterations to the abbey. The perpendicular windows in the north transept and at the west end of the nave were added, and the sedilia in the sanctuary were added. One of the final additions was the Latham Chapel, dedicated to St Catherine, east of the north transept, in 1465.

In the Valor Ecclesiasticus of 1535 the abbey was valued at £719 2s. 6¼d (equivalent to £533,400 in 2025). The abbey surrendered on 6 December 1539. The community comprised the abbot and 23 monks. The abbot was pensioned off on £100 a year (equivalent to £84,000 in 2025); the prior got £8 and the others between £6 6s. 8d. (ten marks) and £5 each.

=== Abbots of Selby ===
- Benedict 1069–1097
- Hugh de Lacy 1097–1123
- Herbert, 1123–1127
- Durand, 1127–1137
- Interregnum 1137–1139
- Walter 1139–1143
- Helias Paynel, 1143–1153
- German, 1153–1160
- Gilbert de Vere, 1160–1184
- Interregnum 1184–1189
- Roger of London, 1189–1195
- Richard I (prior), 1195–1214
- Alexander, 1214–1221
- Richard, 1221–1223
- Richard (sub-prior of Selby), 1223
- Hugh de Drayton, 1245–1254
- Thomas de Whalley, 1254–1263
- David de Cawod, 1263–1269
- William de Aslakeby (prior) 1280,-1293
- John de Wystow I (sub-prior), 1294–1300
- William de Aslaghby (sacrist), 1300–1313
- Simon de Scardeburg (prior), 1313–1321
- John de Wystow II, 1322–1335
- John de Heslyngton (a monk), 1335–1342
- Geoffrey de Gaddesby, 1342–1368
- John de Shirburn, 1369–1408
- William Pigot, 1408–1429
- John Cave, 1429–1436
- John Ousthorp, 1436–1466
- John Sharrow, 1466–1486
- Lawrence Selby, 1487–1504
- Robert Depyng (monk of Crowland Abbey) 1504–1518
- Thomas Rawlinson, 1518–1522
- John Barwic, 1522–1526
- Robert Selby, 1526–1540

== Post-monastic history ==
For a time after the dissolution the church was unused, but in 1618 it became the parish church of Selby. During the English Civil War and the Commonwealth period the building suffered: the north transept window was destroyed, and the statues on the brackets in the choir were demolished.

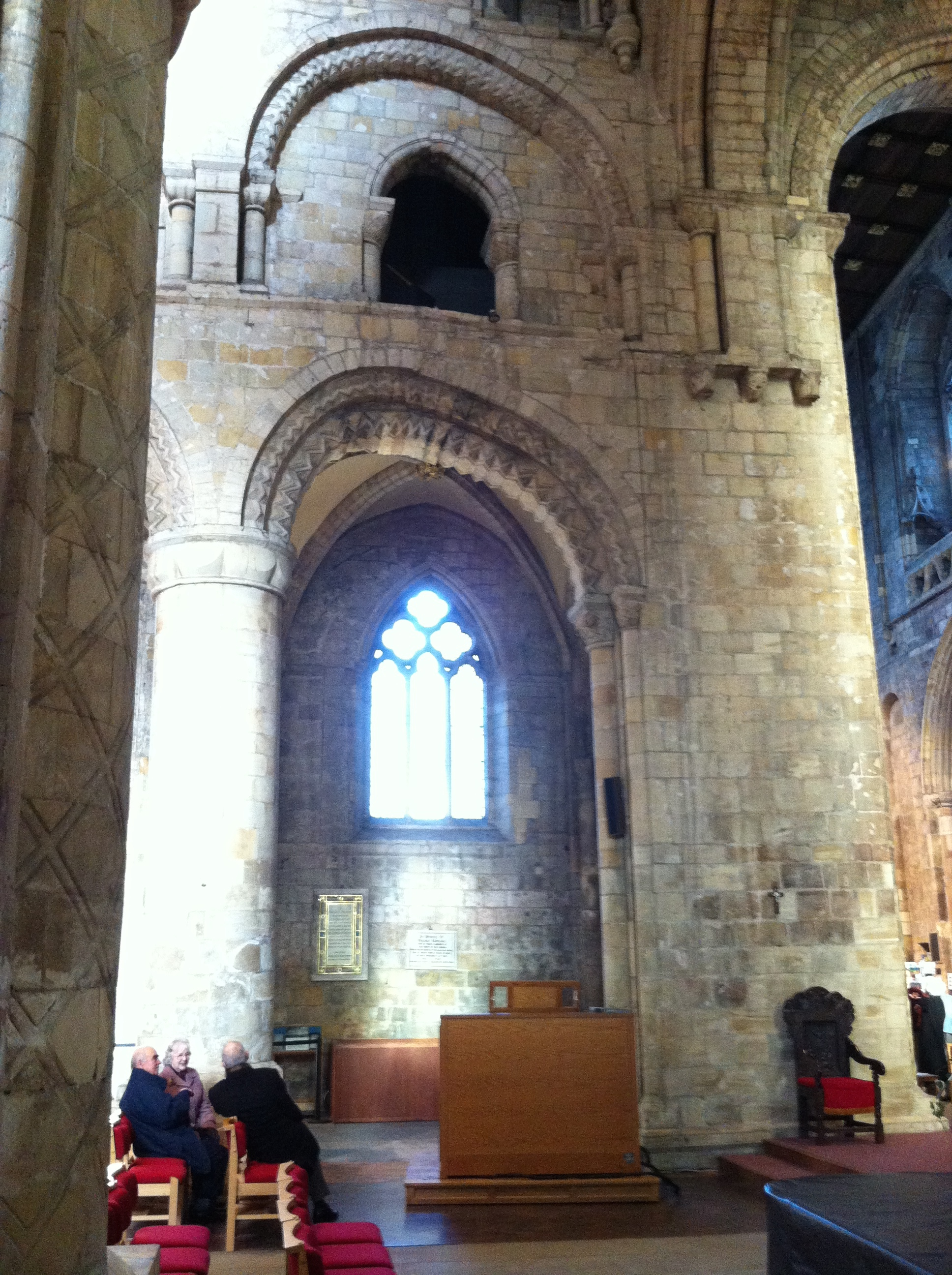
Movement in the stonework adjacent to the crossing tower

Like York Minster, the church rests on a base of sand and has suffered from subsidence. Many sections collapsed entirely during the 17th century, including the central tower in 1690 which destroyed the south transept. The tower was rebuilt, but not the transept. In the 18th century the choir was filled with galleries, and used for services; the nave was used only for secular purposes.

The church was restored by Sir George Gilbert Scott in 1871–1873 who restored much of the nave for use, and again in 1889–1890 by his son John Oldrid Scott, who restored the choir. The tower was restored in the first few years of the 20th century.

The reredos was designed by Robert Lorimer and added in 1901.

=== Vicars of Selby Abbey ===
- Anthony Ashton 1540 – 1583
- Robert Dove 1583 – 1586
- Thomas Tomlinson 1586 – 1603
- John Bradley 1603 – 1610
- Thomas Greenwood 1610 – 1613
- John Moor 1613 – 1620
- Richard Smith BA 1620 – 1625
- John Whitaker BA 1625 – 1642
- Paul Hammerton 1642 – 1650
- Richard Calvert 1650 – 1658
- Thomas Birdsall 1658 – 1666
- Arthur Squire MA 1666 – 1698
- Shadrach Sherburn BA 1698 – 1701
- Henry Allan 1701
- Geoffrey Rishton 1701 – 1720
- Thomas Hardy 1720 – 1728
- William Charnley BA 1728 – 1748
- Marmaduke Teasdale BA 1748 – 1778
- William Porter MA 1778 – 1796
- William Caile 1796 – 1797
- Thomas Mounsey 1797 – 1819
- Jonathan Muncaster 1819 – 1834
- John Leidger Walton MA 1834 – 1850
- Francis Whaley Harper MA 1850 – 1889
- Archibald George Tweedie MA 1889 – 1904
- Maurice Parkin MA 1904 – 1910
- John Solloway DD 1910 – 1941
- Alfred Edgar Moore Glover MA 1941 – 1945
- Frank Read AKC 1945 – 1952
- John Aldwyn Pelham Kent MA 1952 – 1978
- Anthony Cecil Addison Smith MA 1978 – 1983
- Michael William Escritt DipTh 1983 – 1990
- Peter Lawrence Dodd MBE 1990 – 1993
- James Alexander Robertson 1993 – 1996
- Roy Ian John Matthews TD MA 1996 – 1997
- Keith Michael Jukes BA 1997 – 2007
- Keith David Richards 2007 – 2010
- Canon John Weetman 2011 –

=== The fire of 1906 ===
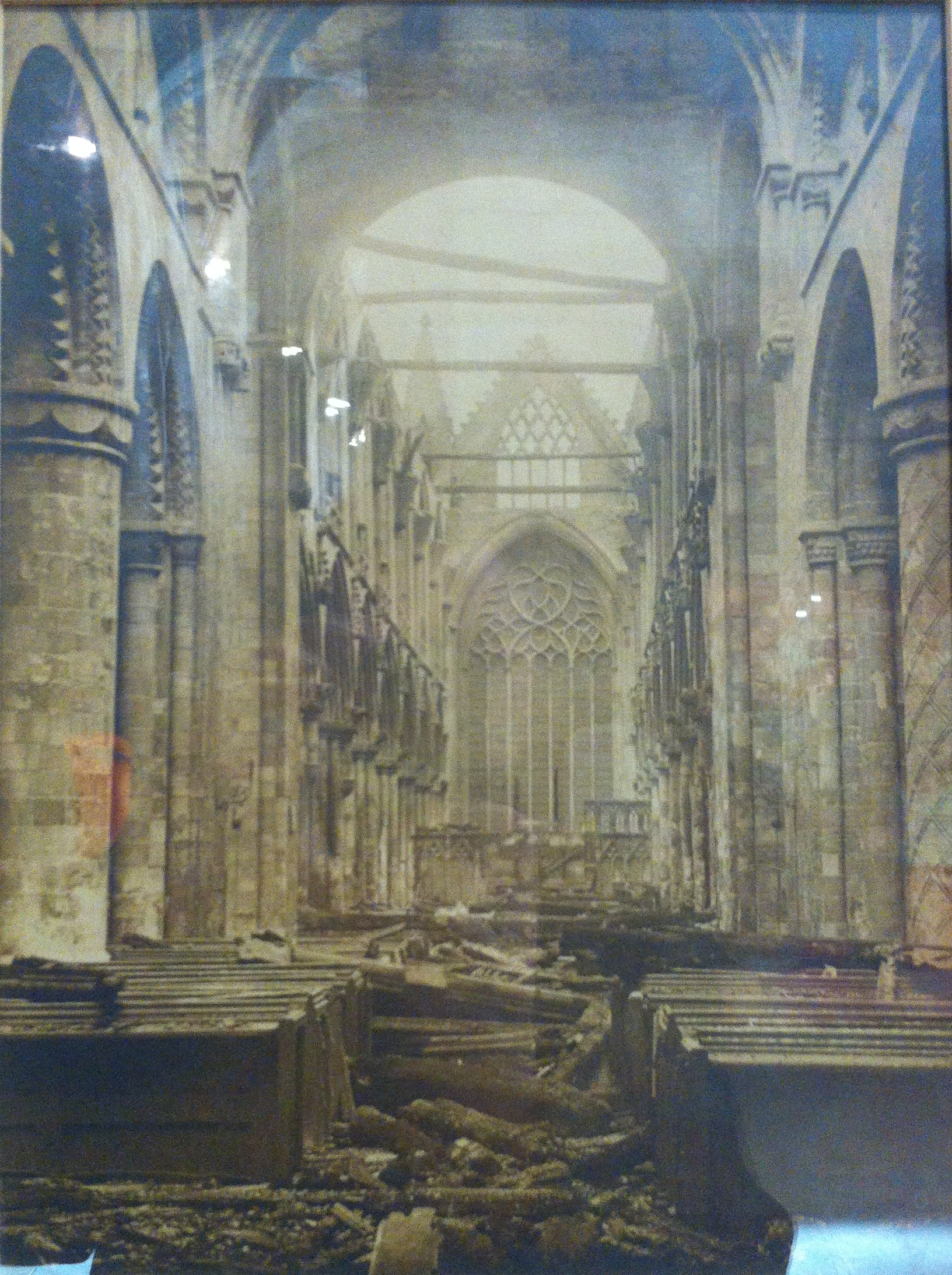
The abbey after the fire of 1906

The organ builders from John Compton had been working until 11.00 pm on Friday 19 October, and shortly after midnight on Saturday the organist Frederick William Sykes spotted flames coming from the organ chamber. The organ builders had been installing a new kinetic gas engine to provide power to the new organ. Initial reports that the new organ equipment was to blame for the fire were later proved inaccurate.

The fire destroyed the roof of the choir and the belfry and peal of eight bells was also destroyed. All of the interior fittings were also destroyed but thanks to the actions of the local fire brigade, the fourteenth-century stained glass in the East window was saved.

A secondary fire broke out in the nave roof on the Sunday, but this was quickly extinguished.

The abbey was rebuilt under the supervision of John Oldrid Scott at a cost of around £50,000 (equivalent to £5,146,000 in 2025) and reopened in 1909. The restoration of the south transept was completed in 1912, funded by William Liversedge.

=== Later twentieth century ===
In 1952 the abbey was given Grade I listed status.

=== Restorations of 2002 ===
In 2002 the abbey underwent an extensive restoration, costing several million pounds. Stage 6, the restoration of the Scriptorium was completed at a cost of £795,000. The £400,000 cost of restoring the South choir Aisle and the "Washington Window" was met in full by British American Tobacco. World Monuments Fund committed more than $800,000 to exterior work, including roof repairs, beginning in 2002.

== The Washington Window ==
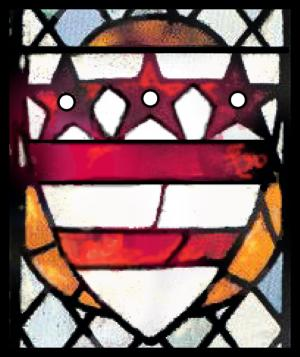
Coat of arms of the Washington family in fifteenth-century stained glass at Selby Abbey, England

A notable feature of the abbey is the fifteenth-century Washington Window, located at the clerestory level of the quire, which features the heraldic arms of the ancestors of George Washington, the first president of the United States. It is believed the shield is in the Abbey thanks to a financial benefaction supporting the work of the monastery at Selby from John Wessington, one of George Washington's ancestors, who was Prior of Durham from 1416 to 1446. The design is thought to be one of the oldest representations of the Flag of the United States in the world. Selby Abbey is on the 'American Trail' of attractions around the UK with strong American historical connections.

== Organ ==
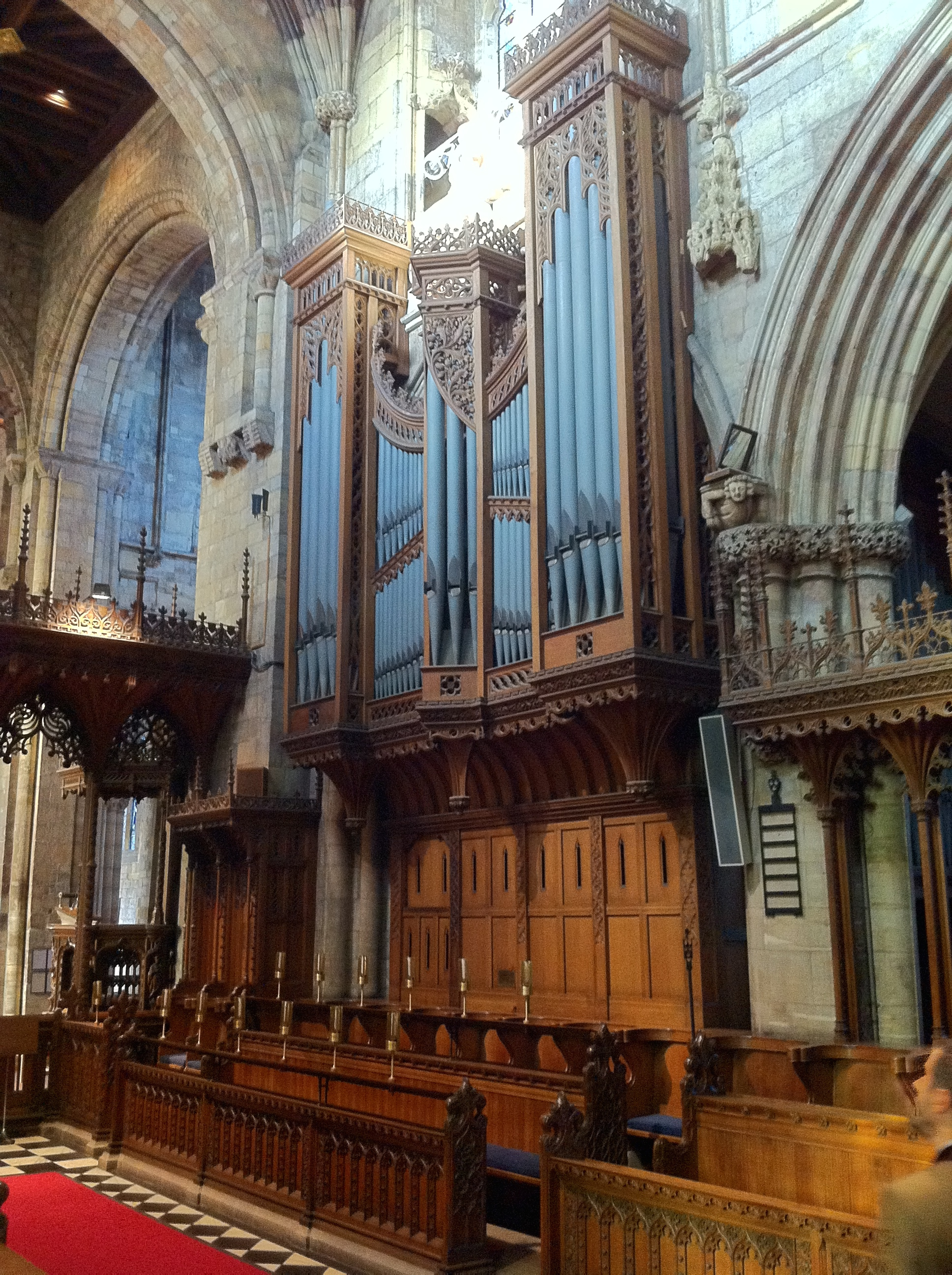
The organ at Selby Abbey, built in 1909 by William Hill & Son, (south) case designed by John Oldrid Scott

The previous organ was installed in 1825 by Renn and Boston, in a gallery on the east side of the choir screen wall. It was rebuilt several times by Booth of Wakefield, Forster and Andrews of Hull and Conacher of Huddersfield. In 1868 the organ was rebuilt and moved to a bay in the quire. The opening recital was given by William Thomas Best. This organ was rebuilt in 1891 by James Jepson Binns of Bramley and moved again, this time to the north side of the quire. A rebuild took place by John Compton in 1906, but the organ was destroyed by the great fire of that year, which nearly destroyed the abbey too.

Following the 1906 fire and as part of the subsequent restoration of the Abbey, the firm of William Hill & Son was commissioned to build the current organ, completed in 1909. With 67 speaking stops and 4 manuals, most of the pipes of this instrument occupy two organ cases designed by John Oldrid Scott and placed either side of the choir stalls in the Chancel. The huge pipes of the "Pedal: 32' Double Open Diapason" lie horizontally on the floor of the Triforium overlooking the Nave.

The first major restoration of this organ was carried out in 1950 by Hill, Norman and Beard. In the early 1960s, the Italian virtuoso Fernando Germani made several LP recordings at the Abbey of organ music by Reger, Franck and Liszt, bringing the organ to international attention. In 1975, further alterations and additions were made to the organ by John T. Jackson.

By the 2010s, the organ was showing its age and becoming increasingly unreliable. In 2014, Geoffrey Coffin and Principal Pipe Organs of York were commissioned to carry out a major restoration with Paul Hale as the adviser. The project was completed in 2016.

=== Organists and Directors of Music ===
- Wharton Hooper 1864–1866
- Edward Johnson Bellerby 1878–1881
- Frederick William Sykes 1881–1919
- Henry Oswald Hodgson 1920–1921
- Herbert Hill 1921–1922
- Walter Hartley 1922–1962
- David Patrick Gedge 1962–1966
- Mervyn John Byers 1966–1976
- Peter Seymour 1976–1978
- Anthony Langford 1978–1980
- Mervyn John Byers 1980–1987
- Geoffrey Pearce 1987–1994
- Roger Tebbet 1994–2020
- James Lowery (Interim Organist) 2020–2021
- Oliver Waterer 2021–
- Ian Seddon (Assistant Organist) 2023–

== Burials ==
- Thomas Thwaites and wife Alice de la Hay

== Bishop of Selby ==
The Bishop of Selby is a Suffragan Bishop to the Archbishop of York and oversees the Archdeaconry of York, which includes the Deanery of Selby.

== See also ==
- Monk Fryston
- Monk Fryston Hall
- List of monastic houses in North Yorkshire
- List of English abbeys, priories and friaries serving as parish churches
- Grade I listed buildings in North Yorkshire (district)
- Listed buildings in Selby
