= St Mary's Church, Melton Mowbray =

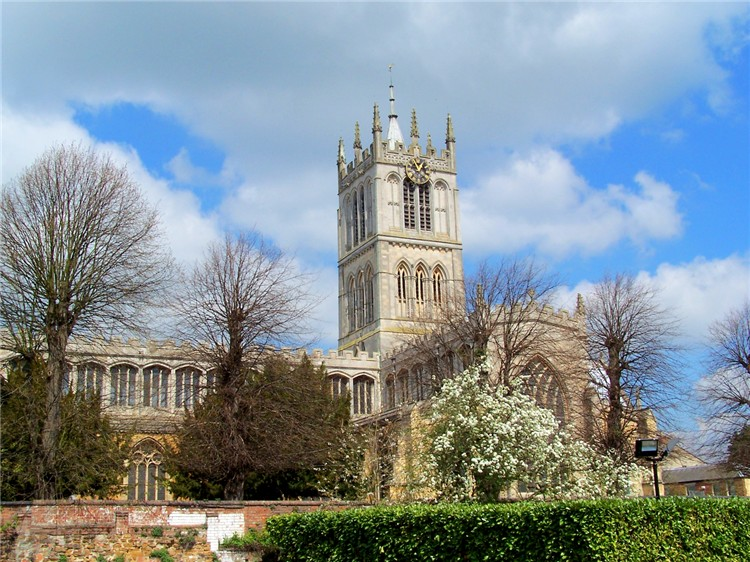
- St Mary's Church
- St Mary's Church, Melton Mowbray
- 52°45′49″N 00°53′11″W
- OS grid reference: SK 75276 19030
- Country: England
- Denomination: Church of England
- Churchmanship: Broad Church
- Website: Website

History
- Status: Active
- Dedication: St Mary

Architecture
- Functional status: Parish church
- Heritage designation: Grade I listed
- Designated: 24 October 1950

Administration
- Province: Province of Canterbury
- Diocese: Diocese of Leicester
- Archdeaconry: Archdeaconry of Leicester
- Deanery: Framland
- Parish: Melton Mowbray

Clergy
- Rector: The Revd Dr Mary Barr

St Mary is the parish church of Melton Mowbray, Leicestershire. The large medieval church, described as "one of the finest parish churches in Leicestershire", suffered from a poor Victorian restoration, and was left in a poor state of repair and deemed "unfit for purpose". By late 2017, work was completed to make the church more accessible and safe, which included a new floor and underfloor heating, a lighting and sound system and a rebuild of the historic organ; the reordering cost an approximate £2 million.

== Features ==
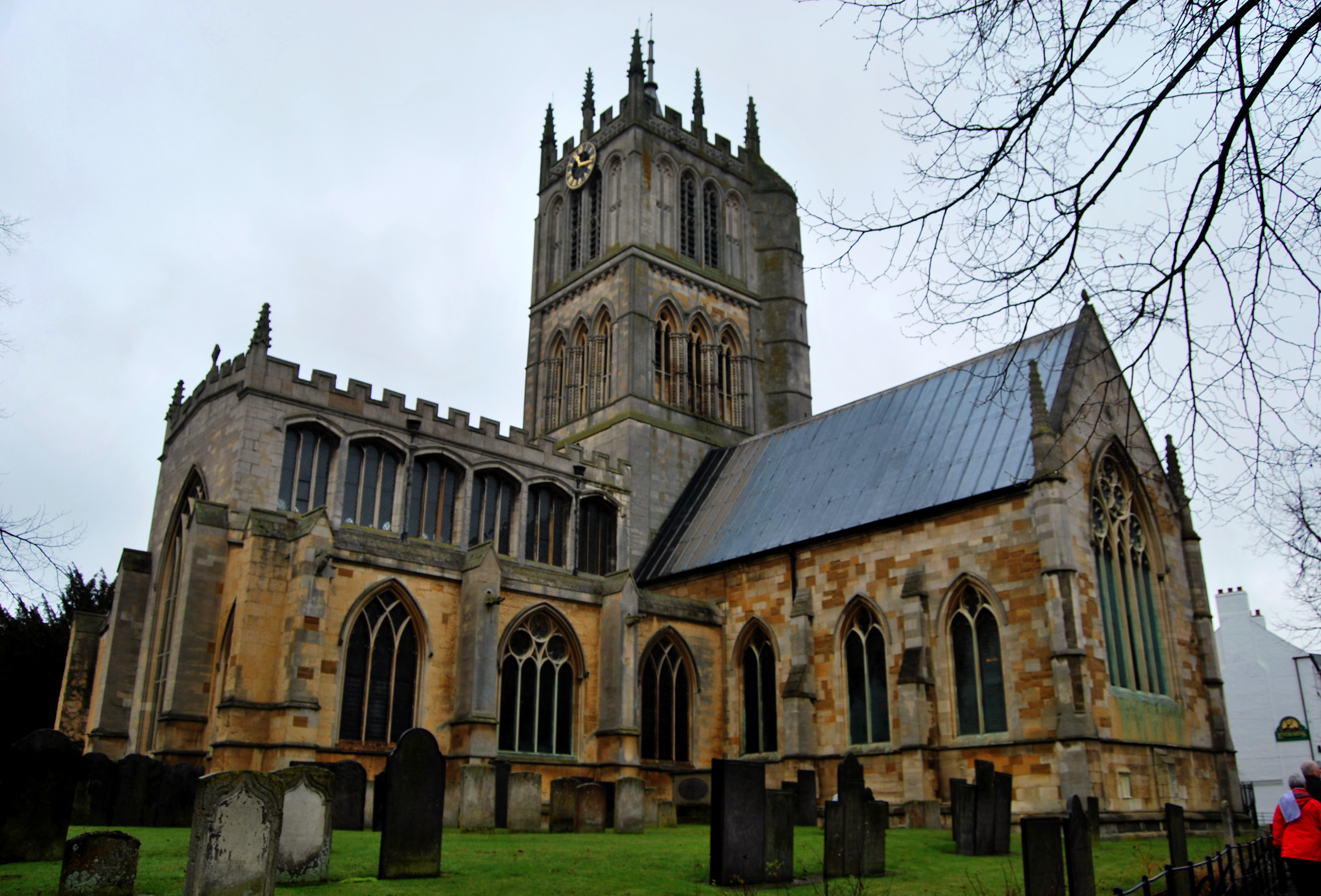
Melton Mowbray St Marys SE aspect

St Mary's Church is the largest and "stateliest" parish church in Leicestershire, with visible remains dating mainly from the 13th-15th centuries. The stonework in the lowest section of the tower, which has Norman windows, dates from 1170, although there were certainly one or more Anglo-Saxon churches on this site before the Norman one. It is built on a plan more usual for cathedrals and the 100-foot (30 m) tower dominates the town, and is a rare example of a parish church with aisled transepts (one of only five in the country) a feature usually found only in a cathedral. It contains a number of notable monuments including the tomb of Roger de Mowbray, 1st Baron Mowbray and others dating from the 14th to the 18th century; also a memorial tablet to equine artist John Ferneley (1782 to 1860).

The church has a large choir containing around 40 members. It forms part of the Framland church trail along with 14 other churches in the 'Framland area'. Copies of the guide to the church trail are available from Melton Tourist Information Centre.

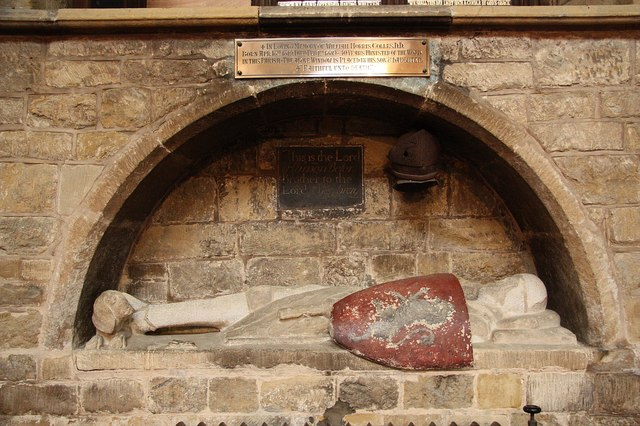
Crusader knight tomb in St Mary's church, c. 1300, thought to be Hamon Belers, a relative of the de Mowbrays

== Bells and carillon ==
The belfry contains ten bells. The earliest bell (No.6) is by John of York dating from the fourteenth century. Most of the rest have been recast. Until 1802 there were only six bells: then two more were added and in 1894 a further two made the total ten. In addition there is a small sanctus bell which dates from the seventeenth century.

The carillon on which the chimes are played three times a day were restored in 1938 through a bequest by Alice Henton. This restoration involved a new clock to replace the previous one dating from the early nineteenth century.

== List of rectors ==
- 1562 Miles Bennes
- 1578 Edward Turner
- 1599–1613 Isaac Cooper
- 1613–1659† Zachary Cawdray
- 1660–1690† John Dowell
- 1690–1731† Simon Henley
- 1731–1740† John Hardy
- 1740–1741† Foulk Myddelton
- 1741–1773† Thomas Myddelton
- 1773–1820 Thomas Ford
- 1820–1832† Thomas Godfrey
- 1832–1839 John Savile Hallifax
- 1839–1866† Robert Fleetwood Croughton
- 1866–1889† William Morris Colles (father of William Morris Colles)
- 1889–1891 Gilbert Karney
- 1891–1924 Canon Richard Blakeney (son of Richard Paul Blakeney)
- 1924–1928 John Llewellyn Davies
- 1928–1937 Canon Percy Robson
- 1937 Canon Harold R. Bates
- 1946 Canon Charles Maurice Strettell Clark
- 1965 Canon George Herbert Codrington
- 1981 Canon Donald Edward Boughton Law
- 1989 Donald Henry Thorpe
- 1994–2009 Canon Charles Jenkin (son of Lord Jenkin)
- 2009–2022 Kevin Ashby
- 2023 - current Dr Mary Elizabeth Barr

† Rector died in post

== Organ ==
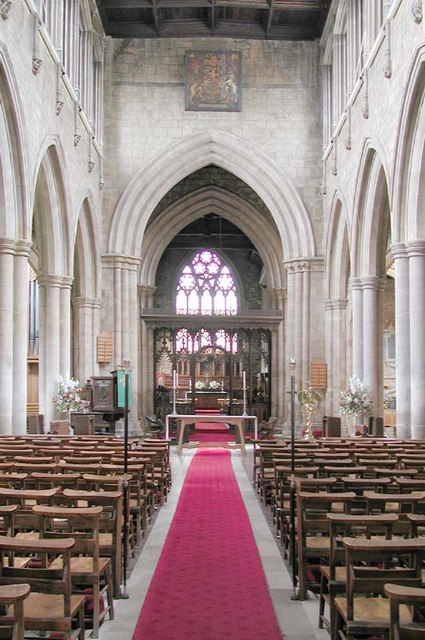
Interior, looking East

A new organ was installed by John Gray of London was opened on 30 September 1832. It was built in the fashion of two Gothic towers and was intended to stand at the west end of the church allowing a view of the window in the middle. It was enlarged by Groves and Mitchell in 1849 to comprise 27 stops over two manuals and pedals and re-opened on 13 January 1850. In this new incarnation it was moved to a position either side of the chancel. The organ was enlarged again in 1897 by William Hill and Son to become a 3 manual and pedal instrument of 39 stops. In 1929–30, Haydn Morton overhauled the instrument, inserted pneumatic action to the pedal board, and made layout modifications to assist with tuning and maintenance. The console was moved into the north transept. This was rebuilt by J. W. Walker & Sons Ltd in 1955. A specification of the organ can be found on the National Pipe Organ Register. In 2018, Henry Groves & Son completed a rebuild and re-ordering of the 3-manual Hill/Walker organ, including addition of pedal 32 ft Contra Trombone and a 5-rank Great Cornet, 69 stops.

=== List of organists ===
Taken from handwritten list in the church on the organ console:

- Thomas Hickson 1846 - 1880
- Claude Ferneley 1880 - 1890
- L. Camidge 1890 - 1900
- Percy Jones 1900 - 1914
- Malcolm Sargent 1914 - 1924
- William Hunt 1925 - 1928
- Percy George Saunders 1928 - 1930 later organist of Wakefield Cathedral
- William Dean Pearson 1930 - 1937 - 1940
- Lt. Col. Skentelbury 1941
- Cecil Clarke 1942 - 1946
- Harold L. Barnes 1946 - 1966
- John A. Bellamy 1966 - 1968
- Eric Bennett 1968 - 1973
- Michael Bryan Hesford 1973 - 1978
- Ian Major 1978 - 1982
- Robert Kalton 1982 - 1987
- Douglas Hollick 1987 - 1988
- John Wilks 1988 - 1991
- John Clark 1991 - 1998
- Anne de Graeve 1998 - 2002
- Keith Morgan 2002–2005
- James Gutteridge 2005 - current
