= David Thomas =

David, Dave, or Dai Thomas may refer to:

== Academics and education ==
- David Thomas (educationalist) (1880–1967), Welsh educationalist and politician
- David A. Thomas (academic) (born 1956), American psychologist, president of Morehouse College, Atlanta
- David A. Thomas (educator) (1917–2004), American educator, the dean of the Johnson School at Cornell
- David Oswald Thomas (1924–2005), Welsh philosopher at Aberystwyth University
- D. Winton Thomas (1901–1970), British scholar of Hebrew
- J. David Thomas (born 1931), British papyrologist and classical scholar
- David N. Thomas (academic) (born 1962), British marine biologist
- David Arthur Thomas (1938–2013), British legal scholar and judge

== Arts ==
=== Literature ===
- David Thomas, pen name of Dave Thompson (author) (born 1960), English writer about music
- David Thomas (Dafydd Ddu Eryri) (1759–1822), Welsh poet
- David Thomas (Dewi Hefin) (1828–1909), Welsh poet and schoolteacher
- David N. Thomas (born 1945), Welsh writer
- David St John Thomas (1929–2014), English publisher and writer
- Diana (formerly David) Thomas (born 1959), English writer, also known under her pen name Tom Cain

=== Music ===
- Dave Thomas (born 1936), stage name of American broadcaster and weatherman Dave Roberts when he was at WKBW-TV Buffalo
- David Thomas (born 1966), musician with Take 6
- David Thomas (bass) (born 1943), British early-music and baroque-music singer
- David Thomas (composer) (1881–1928), Welsh composer
- David Thomas (musician) (1953–2025), American musician, member of group Pere Ubu
- David Vaughan Thomas (1873–1934), composer, organist, pianist and music administrator

=== Other arts ===
- Dave Thomas (actor) (born 1949), Canadian actor and comedian
- David A. Thomas (voice actor) (born 1955), American voice actor and painter
- David Thomas, former director of Newcastle Art Gallery, Newcastle, Australia

== Business ==
- David and Tonya Thomas, Baltimore chefs, restaurateurs, and food historians
- David Thomas (industrialist) (1794–1882), Welsh industrialist
- D. A. Thomas (David Alfred Thomas, 1856–1918), Welsh industrialist and politician
- David A. Thomas (software developer), Canadian software technology figure
- Dave Thomas (businessman) (1932–2002), founder, former chairman & spokesperson of the North American Wendy's fast-food chain
- David Chandler Thomas (1954–2021), American economist and technology executive

== Politics ==
- David Thomas (British politician) (1892–1954), Welsh Labour politician
- David Thomas (educationalist) (1880–1967), Welsh educationalist and politician
- David Thomas (MEP) (born 1955), British Labour politician
- David Thomas (Florida politician) (born 1945), American politician, member of the Florida House of Representatives
- David Thomas (New York politician) (1762–1831), American politician, Congressman from New York
- David Thomas (Ohio politician) (born 1993), American politician, member of the Ohio House of Representatives
- David Thomas (Texas politician) (1795–1836), American politician, signer of Texas Declaration of Independence
- David L. Thomas (born 1949), American politician, South Carolina state senator
- Dave Thomas (politician) (born 1965), American politician from Alabama
- David Thomas (Trinidad and Tobago politician), member of parliament

== Religion ==
- David Thomas (archdeacon of Cardigan) (died 1951), Welsh priest
- David Thomas (archdeacon of Gower) (1897–1971), Welsh Anglican priest
- David Thomas (archdeacon of Montgomery) (1833–1916), Welsh priest and historian
- David Thomas (bishop) (1942–2017), Welsh bishop
- David Thomas (missionary priest) (1829–1905), Welsh priest
- David Thomas (Protestant minister, born 1813) (1813–1894), Welsh preacher and publisher
- David Thomas (Congregationalist minister) (1811–1876), British Victorian Congregationalist minister

== Science ==
- David Thomas (Canadian scientist), Canadian biochemist
- David Thomas (geographer) (born 1958), British geographer
- Dave Thomas (programmer) (born 1960), British-American computer programmer and writer
- Dave Thomas (skeptic) (born 1953), American physicist and mathematician known for his scientific skepticism
- David A. Thomas (academic) (born 1956), American psychologist and academic
- David Gilbert Thomas (1928–2015), British-American chemist and physicist
- David Hurst Thomas (born 1945), American archaeologist

== Sports ==
=== Association football ===
- Dai Thomas (footballer, born 1926) (1926–2014), Swansea City A.F.C. and Welsh international footballer
- Dai Thomas (footballer, born 1975), Welsh footballer
- Dave Thomas (footballer, born 1917) (1917–1991), English footballer
- Dave Thomas (footballer, born 1950), English footballer
- Lyn Thomas (footballer) (David Stuart Lynne Thomas, 1920–1993), Welsh footballer

=== Rugby ===
- Dai Thomas (rugby league) (1879–1958), rugby league footballer of the 1900s for Other Nationalities, and Oldham
- Dai Thomas (rugby union) (1909–?), Welsh international rugby player
- Dave Thomas (rugby union, born 1941) (1941–2017), Welsh rugby player
- Dave Thomas (rugby union, born 1988), New Zealand rugby player
- David Thomas (rugby league), rugby league footballer of the 1900s for Wales, Halifax, and Mid-Rhondda
- David John Thomas (1879–1925), Welsh international rugby player
- David Thomas (rugby union) (1909–1952), Welsh international rugby union player.

=== Cricket ===
- David Thomas (cricketer, born 1911) (1911–2001), Welsh cricketer
- David Thomas (cricketer, born 1959) (1959–2012), English cricketer
- David Thomas (cricketer, born 1963), former English cricketer

=== Gridiron football ===
- David Thomas (American football) (born 1983), American football tight end
- David Thomas (gridiron football) (born 1951), American football cornerback
- Dave Thomas (cornerback) (born 1968), American football cornerback

=== Other sports ===
- Dave Thomas (baseball) (1905–1968), Negro league baseball player
- Dave Thomas (basketball) (born 1976), Canadian basketball player
- David Thomas (beach volleyball) (born 1974), Trinidad and Tobago beach volleyball player
- David Thomas (boxer) (1937–1980), British Olympic boxer
- David Thomas (field hockey) (1927–2024), British Olympic hockey player
- Dave Thomas (golfer) (1934–2013), Welsh golfer

== Other ==
- David Cuthbert Thomas (1896–1916), Welsh soldier of the First World War
- David Courtney Thomas (died 1990), American murder victim
- David Thomas (murderer) (died 1995), executed Vincentian criminal
- David M. Thomas Jr. (born 1958), officer in the United States Navy
- David Thomas (jeweller) (1942–2026), Crown Jeweller for the British monarchy
- David Thomas (judge), justice of the Supreme Court of Queensland
- Dai Thomas (character), fictional character in Marvel Comics

== See also ==
- Davyd Thomas (born 1956), officer in the Royal Australian Navy
- David Clayton-Thomas (born 1941), musician and lead singer of Blood, Sweat & Tears
- Thomas (surname)
