= List of Soldier's Medal recipients =

This article contains a list of Wikipedia articles about recipients of the United States Army's Soldier's Medal, awarded to "any person of the Armed Forces of the United States or of a friendly foreign nation who, while serving in any capacity with the Army of the United States, distinguished himself or herself by heroism not involving actual conflict with an enemy." (Army Regulation 600-8-22).

== Soldier's Medal ==
=== Inter-war years ===
- William A. Matheny, USAAF

=== World War II ===
- Marty Allen, USAAF (comedian)
- Allison Brooks, USAAF
- David E. Grange, Jr., WW2 or Korea
- Bob Hoover, USAAF
- Otto Kerner, Jr., USA
- Charles A. MacGillivary, USA, MOH
- Henry Mucci
- Frank D. Peregory, USA, MOH
- Preston Schoyer, USA
- Walter K. Wilson, Jr., USA, WW2 or other

=== Korea ===
- John T. Corley, USA, Korea or WW2
- John Galvin, USA, Korea or Vietnam
- Reis Leming, USAF, during Korean War
- Leo J. Meyer, USA, Korea, 1951
- Edwin W. Rawlings, USAF, Post-Korea, 1954
- Leon L. Van Autreve, Korea or other

=== Vietnam ===
- Glenn Andreotta, USA
- Leonard Boswell, USA
- Lawrence Colburn, USA
- Alan Cozzalio, USA
- Richard Gary Davis, USA
- William W. Hartzog, USA
- Mike Hayden, USA
- Colin Powell, USA
- Doug Peacock, USA
- Donn A. Starry, USA
- Hugh Thompson, USA
- Alfred Valenzuela, USA

=== Gulf War ===
- Wayne A. Downing, USA, Gulf War or Vietnam

=== Awarded Soldier's Medal ===
- James Leroy Bondsteel, USA, MOH, Vietnam
- Melbourne Kimsey, USAF
- John K. Singlaub, USA
