= List of archdeacons in the Church in Wales =

Key
Active archdeacon	Male archdeacon
Inactive archdeacon	Female archdeacon
Position vacant &/or acting archdeacon	

The archdeacons in the Church in Wales are senior Anglican clergy who serve under their dioceses' bishops, usually with responsibility for the area's church buildings and pastoral care for clergy.

== Archdeacons ==
Diocese	Archdeacon	Person	Date of birth & age	Collated (Note: The date the person first became (was collated) an archdeacon.)	Clergy	Churches	Population
Monmouth	The Archdeacon of Newport	Jonathan Williams	1960 (age 64–65)	9 September 2012	19	41	219,061
Swansea and Brecon	The Archdeacon of Brecon	Alan Jevons	1956 (age 68–69)	17 February 2013	28	125	69,695
Swansea and Brecon	The Archdeacon of Gower	Jonathan Davies	14 September 1969 (age 56)	25 September 2016	33	64	260,421
St Davids	The Archdeacon of St Davids	Paul Mackness	1973 (age 51–52)	22 March 2018	30	113	120,075
St Davids	The Archdeacon Missioner	Mones Farah	1964 (age 60–61)	12 August 2018 (for New Church Communities); 1 March 2024 (Missioner)			
St Asaph	The Archdeacon of St Asaph	Andy Grimwood	1968 (age 56–57)	7 October 2018	35	82	210,003
St Davids	The Archdeacon of Cardigan	Eileen Davies	1964 (age 60–61)	20 June 2019	19	106	94,060
Monmouth	The Archdeacon of Monmouth	Ian Rees	1966 (age 58–59)	20 June 2021	22	92	94,401
Llandaff	The Archdeacon of Llandaff	Rhod Green	1974 (age 50–51)	5 September 2021	55	102	598,508
Monmouth	The Archdeacon of the Gwent Valleys	Stella Bailey	1976 (age 48–49)	19 June 2022	12	41	236,235
Bangor	The Archdeacon of Anglesey	John Harvey	1965 (age 59–60)	1 October 2022	11	62	69,751
Swansea and Brecon	The Archdeacon with responsibility for Ministry Areas	Peter Brooks	1955 (age 69–70)	17 December 2022			
St Asaph	The Archdeacon of Wrexham	Hayley Matthews	1968 (age 56–57)	5 March 2023	44	61	236,200
Bangor	The Archdeacon of Bangor	David Parry	1962 (age 62–63)	1 October 2023	12	42	94,685
Bangor	The Archdeacon of Meirionnydd	Robert Townsend	1968 (age 56–57)	1 October 2023	16	66	68,874
St Davids	The Archdeacon of Carmarthen	Matthew Hill	1971 (age 53–54)	11 January 2024	27	98	173,415
Llandaff	The Archdeacon of Margam	Mark Preece	1961 (age 63–64)	11 February 2024	56	126	427,681
St Asaph	The Archdeacon of Montgomery	Gerwyn Capon	1965 (age 59–60)	1 September 2024	14	62	65,297

== Timeline of changes to and new archdeaconries ==
Year	Events	No. of archdeaconries at end of year
Ancient foundations (c. 1050–1250)	Anglesey, Bangor and Merioneth in Bangor Diocese; Llandaff in Llandaff Diocese; St Asaph in St Asaph Diocese; Brecon, Cardigan, Carmarthen and St Davids in St Davids Diocese	9
1844	Monmouth created in Llandaff Diocese; Montgomery created in St Asaph Diocese; Anglesey (Bangor Diocese) discontinued; Bangor (Bangor Diocese) renamed Bangor & Anglesey	10
1890	Wrexham created in St Asaph Diocese	11
1921	Monmouth transferred from Llandaff to the new Monmouth Diocese	
1923	Brecon transferred from St Davids to the new Swansea & Brecon Diocese; Gower created in Swansea & Brecon Diocese	12
1930	Newport created in Monmouth Diocese	13
1948	Margam created in Llandaff Diocese	14
2002	Morgannwg created in Llandaff Diocese	15
2018	Gwent Valleys created in Monmouth Diocese; Anglesey (re-)created in Bangor Diocese; Missioner created in St Davids Diocese; Bangor & Anglesey (Bangor Diocese) renamed Bangor	18
2020	Morgannwg (Llandaff Diocese) discontinued	17
2022	Ministry Areas created in Swansea & Brecon Diocese	18
