= Richard Davies =

Richard Davies may refer to:

== Arts and entertainment ==
=== Performing arts ===
- Richard Davies (American actor) (1915–1994), American film actor
- Richard Davies (Australian actor)
- Richard Davies (Welsh actor) (1926–2015), Welsh actor
- Richard Davies (Tru Calling), fictional TV character
- Richard Davies (writer) (born 1950), English writer and actor

=== Music ===
- Richard Davies (musician) (born 1964), Australian singer-songwriter
- Richard Michael Davies, better known as Dik Mik, synthesizer player for Hawkwind
- Rick Davies (musician), multi-instrumentalist and member of Amoeba
- Rick Davies (Richard Davies, 1944–2025), British musician, vocalist for Supertramp

=== Poetry ===
- Richard Davies (Mynyddog) (1833–1877), poet in the Welsh language

== Military ==
- Richard Bell Davies (1886–1966), British First World War fighter pilot
- Richard Hutton Davies (1861–1918), New Zealand Army officer

== Politics and government ==
- Richard Davies (MP) (1818–1896), member of parliament for and Lord Lieutenant of Anglesey
- Richard Davies (trade unionist) (1862–1938), English trade union leader and politician
- Richard T. Davies (1920−2005), American diplomat

== Religion ==
- Paul Davies (bishop) (Richard Paul Davies, born 1973), British Anglican bishop
- Richard Davies (bishop) (c. 1505–1581), Welsh bishop and scholar
- Richard Davies (Quaker) (1635–1708), Welsh Quaker minister
- Richard William Davies, Welsh Anglican priest
- Richard Davies (archdeacon of Brecon) (c. 1777–1859), Welsh Anglican priest

== Science and medicine ==
- Richard Davies (academic), British geologist
- Richard Davies (doctor) (born 1959), British-born Falkland Islands and New Zealand doctor, New Zealand viceregal consort
- Richard Davies (physician) (died 1761), English physician
- Richard Gareth Davies (1920–2007), British entomologist

== Sports ==
- Dick Davies (1936–2012), American Olympic basketball player
- Richard Davies (cricketer) (born 1954), former English cricketer
- Richard Davies (footballer) (born 1990), footballer playing for Barrow AFC
- Rick Davies (footballer) (born 1952), Australian rules footballer
- Dickie Davies(1928–2023), British television sports presenter

== Other ==
- Richard Davies (courtier) (1916–1995), member of the household of the Duke of Edinburgh
- Richard Llewelyn Davies, Baron Llewelyn-Davies (1912–1981), British architect

== See also ==
- Richard Davis (disambiguation)
