= Harold Williams =

Harold Williams may refer to:

== Arts and entertainment ==
- Harold Williams (baritone) (1893–1976), Australian singer
- Harold S. Williams (1898–1987), Australian author who lived in Japan
- Harold Ivory Williams (musician) (1949–2010), American jazz keyboardist, member of MFSB
- Hype Williams (Harold Williams, born 1970), American music video and film director
- H. R. Williams (Harold Ray Williams, fl. 2007–2011), American novelist

== Religion ==
- Harold Williams (priest, died 1954) (1864–1954), Welsh Archdeacon of Gower
- Harold Williams (priest, died 2004) (1917–2004), Welsh Archdeacon of Gower
- Bill Williams (priest) (Harold Claude Noel Williams, 1914–1990), Anglican Provost of Coventry
- Harold Ivory Williams (1921–2014), American bishop

== Others ==
- Harold Williams (linguist) (1876–1928), New Zealand journalist and polyglot
- Harold Herbert Williams (1880–1964), English scholar, expert on the works of Jonathan Swift
- Harold P. Williams (1882–1963), American attorney and judge
- Harold Williams (British Army officer) (1897–1971), British Army officer
- Harold Williams (footballer) (1924–2014), Welsh international footballer
- Harold M. Williams (1928–2017), chairman of U.S. Securities and Exchange Commission, 1977–1981
- Harold Williams (geologist) (1934–2010), Canadian geologist
- Harold Williams (cricketer) (born 1959), Grenadian cricketer
- J. Harold Williams (1888–1981), American professor and educator

== See also ==
- Harry Williams (disambiguation)
