= Andrew Phillips =

Andrew or Andy Phillips may refer to:

== Sportspeople ==
- Andrew Phillips (footballer, born 1970), Australian rules footballer for Carlton
- Andrew Phillips (footballer, born 1991), Australian rules footballer for Essendon, Greater Western Sydney and Carlton
- Andrew Phillips (swimmer) (born 1962), Jamaican swimmer
- Andy Phillips (baseball) (born 1977), American baseball coach
- Andy Phillips (center) (born 1991), American football player
- Andy Phillips (kicker) (born 1989), American football player
- Andy Phillips (speedway rider) (born 1968), English speedway rider

== Others ==
- Andrew Phillips (historian), English historian
- Andrew Phillips (lawyer), American deaf civil rights advocate
- Andrew Phillips, Baron Phillips of Sudbury (1939–2023), British solicitor and Liberal Democrat politician
- Andrew Phillips (priest), Archdeacon of Brecon, 1578–1620

== See also ==
- Andrew Philips (Passenger musician)
- Andy Philips (Aerial musician)
