= Archdeacon of Gower =

Priest in charge of the Archdeaconry of Gower

The archdeacon of Gower is the priest in charge of the archdeaconry of Gower, an administrative division of the Church in Wales Diocese of Swansea and Brecon. The archdeaconry comprises the six deaneries of Clyne, Cwmtawe, Gower, Llwchwr, Penderi and Swansea.

== History ==
The archdeaconry of Gower and the corresponding role of archdeacon of Gower were created in 1923, coinciding with the creation of the Diocese of Swansea and Brecon. The other archdeaconry of the current diocese, Brecon archdeaconry has existed since 1137 or before.

== List of archdeacons ==
- 1923–1954 (d.): Harold Williams
- 1954–1958 (res.): Jack Thomas (became Bishop of Swansea and Brecon)
- February 1958 – 1959: John Thomas
- August 1959 – 1969: David Thomas
- 1969–1979 (ret.): Harry Craven Williams MBE
- 1979-1983 Hubert Hughes
- 1983–1987 (ret.): Harold Williams
- 1987–1989 (ret.): Owain Jones
- 1990–1995 (ret.): Roy Luther Thomas
- 1995–1999 (res.): Anthony Pierce (became Bishop of Swansea and Brecon)
- 1999–2000 (ret.): Brian James
- 2000–2016 (ret.): Robert Williams
- 25 September 2016 – present: Jonathan Davies
