= Robert Williams (archdeacon of Gower) =

Robert Williams (born 1951) is a Welsh Anglican priest. He was the Archdeacon of Gower from 2000 to 2016.

Williams was educated at the University of Wales Bangor and St. Michael's College, Llandaff and ordained in 1976. He held incumbencies at Reynoldston and Denbigh before his appointment as Archdeacon.

Church in Wales titles
Preceded by Brian James	Archdeacon of Gower; 2000–2016	Succeeded by Jonathan Davies
