= Peter Brook (disambiguation) =

Peter Brook (1925–2022) was an English theatre and film director.

Peter Brook may also refer to:

- Peter Brook (painter) (1927–2009), English painter
- Peter Brook (rugby union) (1906–1992), Church of England priest and England international rugby union player

== See also ==
- Peter Brooke (disambiguation), various people
- Peter Brooks (disambiguation), various people
