= Richard Davis =

Richard Davis may refer to:

== Business ==
- Rich Davis (1926–2015), American businessman, creator of KC Masterpiece barbecue sauce
- Richard K. Davis (born 1958), American businessman, chairman, president and CEO of U.S. Bancorp
- Richard C. Davis (born 1963), American businessman, founder, president and CEO of Trademark Properties, creator of Flip This House
- Todd Davis (businessman) (Richard Todd Davis, born 1968), American businessman, founder of LifeLock
- Richard Davis, American businessman and inventor of all-kevlar body armor, founder of the Second Chance Body Armor Company

== Music ==
- Richard Davis (composer) (died 1688), English composer and organist
- Richard Davis (bassist) (1930–2023), American jazz double bass player
- Richard Davis (techno artist) (born 1952), American techno music pioneer with the group Cybotron
- Richie Davis (musician) (born 1957), American R&B guitarist and bandleader
- Richard F. W. Davis (born 1966), American musician, record producer and songwriter, pop and rock

== Politics ==
- Richard D. Davis (1799–1871), U.S. Representative from New York
- Rick Davis (political consultant) (born 1959), American political consultant, head of the John McCain presidential campaign

== Sports ==
- Richard Davis (footballer) (born 1943), English footballer with Plymouth Argyle, Southampton and Bristol City
- Richie Davis (Canadian football) (born 1945), American player of American and Canadian football
- Ricky Davis (American football) (born 1953), American football player
- Rick Davis (born 1958), American soccer player
- Richard Davis (cricketer) (1966–2003), English cricketer
- Ricky Davis (born 1979), American basketball player

== Other ==
- Richard Barrett Davis (1782–1854), British animal and landscape painter
- Dick Davis (translator), English–American Iranologist
- Richard Davis (missionary) (1790–1863), New Zealand meteorologist, missionary and farmer
- Richard Harding Davis (1864–1916), American journalist and fiction writer
- Richard Davis, friend of Elvis Presley featured in Elvis: That's the Way It Is
- Richard William Davis (1941–2012), American murderer and suspected serial killer
- Richard Davis (astronomer) (1949–2016), British astronomer
- Richard Gary Davis (fl. 1967), American soldier and recipient of the Soldier's Medal
- Richard Allen Davis (born 1954), American convicted murderer and child molester
- Richard Davis (political scientist), American political scientist, professor emeritus at Brigham Young University
- Richard L. Davis, American convicted rapist, connected to the Kennedy v. Louisiana Supreme Court decision
- Richard T. Davis (1978–2003), American soldier killed by his fellow soldiers

== See also ==
- Richard Davies (disambiguation)
- Dick Davis (disambiguation)
- Dickie Davis (disambiguation)
