= Alan Cozzalio =

American army officer (1946–1993)

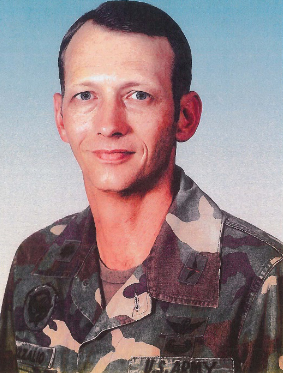
- Born: August 19, 1946; Ashland, Oregon, U.S.
- Died: April 30, 1993 (aged 46); Portland, Oregon, U.S.
- Military career
- Allegiance: United States
- Branch: United States Army
- Service years: 1966–1986
- Rank: Lieutenant colonel
- Nickname: Ace
- Conflicts: Vietnam War
- Awards: Distinguished Service Cross; Soldier's Medal

Alan "Ace" Cozzalio (August 19, 1946 – April 30, 1993) was an American army officer, primarily known for his distinguished service as a helicopter pilot in the Vietnam War. Initially nominated for the Medal of Honor, he instead received the Distinguished Service Cross as well as every lesser commendation of valor. He remained in the army, rising to the rank of lieutenant colonel before being medically retired due to heart problems. He died six years later at the age of 46 after an unsuccessful heart transplant operation.

== Early life and education ==
Cozzalio was born August 19, 1946, in Ashland, Oregon, and raised on his family's 350-acre (140 ha) ranch on the Klamath River on the California/Oregon border where he learned to ride horses as a young child. His father, Mel Cozzilio, was a deputy sheriff with the Siskiyou County Sheriff's Department and later an agent with the California Bureau of Narcotic Enforcement. His mother was an art teacher and dean of women at Yreka High School. Cozzalio attended the local schools in Ashland, Hornbrook, California, and high school in Yreka and Sacramento, California. He graduated from Mira Loma High School in 1964. He attended American River Junior College for a year. He worked as a cook and assistant manager at an International House of Pancakes in Sacramento before being drafted into the United States Army in February 1966.

He graduated from Armor Officers Candidate School in April 1967 and was commissioned a Second Lieutenant of Armor. He then received helicopter pilot training from March to October 1967 at the Army Aviation School. Flying came naturally, and he demonstrated exceptional aptitude with rotary-wing aircraft.

== Vietnam (1967–1972) ==
Cozzalio arrived for first time in Vietnam in December 1967, he was deployed to the Bearcat Base in Đồng Nai province and was assigned to an air cavalry reconnaissance unit (D Troop, 3rd Squadron, 5th Cavalry Regiment) attached to the 9th Infantry Division. The unit wore yellow scarves and white Stetsons, evoking the uniform of prior-era horse cavalry units. Cozzalio served as a "War Wagon" pilot, flying the small, two-man OH-6 light observation helicopters—nicknamed Loaches—used for low-level reconnaissance and rapid engagement. In his second tour, he flew Huey Cobra gunships.

Citing his skills as a pilot and leadership experience, the unit's commanding officer placed Cozzalio in charge of the Crusader gunship platoon

He was first shot down in December 1967 after his first 18 hours of piloting in Vietnam, where Cozzalio suffered a broken jaw after crashing, which required a six-week hospital stay, he was treated at the 106th General Hospital in Yokohama, Japan before returning to duty.

On April 10, Cozzalio became the Aero Scout Section Leader, during which he participated in the May Offensive in Saigon's Cholon sector from May 5 until May 11, 1968, providing critical gunship support during the intense fighting. On May 10, the D Troop along with the 3rd Brigade, 9th Infantry Division, was credited with killing 13 enemy combatants during separate engagements throughout the day. On May 17, he was assigned as Aero Scout Section Commander.

In recognition of their valor, Delta Troop was awarded the Valorous Unit Award, one of the U.S. Army's highest collective honors for heroism in combat. The official citation praised their "extraordinary heroism and devotion to duty", crediting their actions with helping to prevent an enemy breakthrough into the capital.

His service included two required six-month tours, during which he received 49 medals including a Silver Star, three Distinguished Flying Crosses, the Soldier's Medal and two Purple Hearts, one for a bullet wound to the neck and another for a broken jaw, suffered after crashing when shot-down, which required a seven-week hospital stay before he returned to duty. He logged over 1,000 hours of combat flying in the area around Saigon.

Flying both Cobra gunships and the Hughes OH-6 Light Observation Helicopter (Loach), he preferred the fast and light Loach and was reportedly the first to arm one with machine guns for offensive operations.

After his twelve months active duty in Vietnam, he took a 30-day leave at his home in Oregon before a voluntary return for an additional six-month extended tour.

United Press International reported that his exploits were "practically legendary" and "far surpass those of the Lone Ranger and Silver".

On January 25, 1969, seven days after his voluntary return to Vietnam, he was awarded, "on the spot", a second Silver Star and promoted in the field from first lieutenant to captain by a general who had observed Cozzalio's assault on an enemy bunker. The incident was part of the Battle of Phu My, where Cozzalio spotted the entrenched enemy position while flying a Cobra gunship. He landed his helicopter and "commandeered" a more maneuverable Loach. "With gallant disregard for his own safety", Cozzalio destroyed the target while hovering a few feet above. He landed to brief the ground forces commander on his view of the battlefield, then resumed flying to direct and support the infantry. He was later awarded the Distinguished Service Cross for this action.

Cozzalio spent eighteen months in Vietnam and was shot down a total of six times. Several times, he returned in a helicopter so badly damaged it was never flown again. Despite being one of the "most highly decorated" soldiers of the Vietnam war, he did not return for a fourth tour for "straying too many times across the Demilitarized Zone. Over his three tours, he accumulated over 2,100 flying hours in the OH-6A, Bell UH-1 Iroquois, Bell AH-1 Cobra.

== Postwar (1972–1986) ==
After service in Vietnam, he returned to the US for several years before deploying as a Special Services Officer to Thailand in 1972. He attended Sul Ross University in Texas in 1974–1975, before duty as a recruitment officer in Springfield, Massachusetts in 1975–1977. From 1977 to 1980, Major Cozzalio was posted to Katterbach Kaserne, Germany with the 501st Combat Aviation Battalion, first as the S3 operations officer, then as an aviation company commander. He returned to U.S. to attend the United States Army Command and General Staff College at Fort Leavenworth, Kansas in 1980–1981, and then as a Lt. Colonel he led the ROTC programs as the University of Southern Mississippi in 1981–1984 as an assistant professor of military science. He believed that the desire to serve in the military was strongest in the southern United States. His final posting was to command the 4th Training Battalion of the 1st Aviation Brigade at Ft. Rucker, Alabama in 1984–1986.

== Awards ==
=== Distinguished Service Cross ===
Cozzalio, then a Captain, was awarded the Distinguished Service Cross by Maj. General James W. Sutherland for action on January 25, 1969. Cozzalio was flying a Huey Cobra of the 5th Cavalry, 9th Infantry Division when a reinforced enemy machine gun bunker fired on ground troops killing five and wounding others, and pinned-down the entire 90-man unit. Due to the small distance between the bunker and the infantry unit, the type of weapons and lack of maneuverability of the Huey, Cozzalio was unable to attack the bunker. He landed the Cobra and returned in a Light Observation Helicopter (Loach) and while hovering ten feet above the bunker, he destroyed it with direct fire and fragmentation grenades. Unofficial reports say he landed on top of the bunker, allowing his gunner to get out and throw a grenade inside, the two just lifting off before the explosion. He then switched back to the Cobra to continue ground support operations against the enemy.

=== Soldier's Medal ===
For rescuing the unconscious crew of a downed Huey, Cozzalio and his crew chief received the Soldier's Medal.

=== Air Medal with "V" for heroism ===
According to the citation:

Despite extremely dangerous fire being received from the numerically superior Viet Cong force, he executed numerous low level firing passes....Although his aircraft's heavy ordnance was damaged, he continued to make firing passes using only his personal weapons for suppressive fire."

The citation also says that after leaving the battle to obtain more fuel and ammunition, he quickly returned to continue providing air support.

=== Other commendations ===
- Silver Star (2)
- Distinguished Flying Cross (4, 3 Oak leaf clusters)
- Bronze Star Medal (2, 1 Oak leaf cluster)
- Purple Heart (2, 1 Oak leaf cluster)
- Meritorious Service Medal (2, 1 Oak leaf cluster)
- Army Commendation Medal
- Army Achievement Medal
- Good Conduct Medal
- National Defense Service Medal
- Vietnam Service Medal (1 Silver Star and 1 Bronze Star)
- Armed Forces Reserve Medal
- Army Service Ribbon
- Overseas Service Ribbon
- Master Army Aviator Badge
- Vietnam Campaign Medal
- Republic of Vietnam Gallantry Cross with Palm
- Valorous Unit Award (2, 1 Oak leaf cluster)
- Air Medal (48 awards, one with V Device)
- Republic of Vietnam Civil Actions Medal Unit Citation Badge w/ 2 Oak Leaf Clusters
- Unit Citation Badge
- Cambodian Crewchief Wings
- Expert (rifle, pistol)
- Assault Badge

== Personal life ==
Cozzalio participated in the unusual hobby of steer roping in Massachusetts when he was assigned there as a recruiting officer. Placing an advertisement for a roping partner in a local newspaper lead to a front-page article in the Springfield Daily News that was also carried in newspapers throughout the Northeast. A Maine newspaper carried a photograph of Cozzalio on horseback swinging a lasso with the caption "It's a long way to Dodge City". He was also known to wear a replica 1876 cavalry uniform to civic functions, including the 1976 Memorial Day parade in Pittsfield, Massachusetts. He continued the cavalry persona later in his career, carrying books in saddlebags instead of brief cases like the other officers when attending classes at Fort Leavenworth.

As a member of the board of directors of the Living Memorial Sculpture Garden in Weed, California, a memorial to US veterans of all conflicts, he was instrumental in establishing the memorial on US Forest Service land.

Cozzalio married Sherri Giles after leaving Vietnam. They met in Vietnam at the Dong Tam Officers Club where Giles was one of 727 women ("Donut Dollies") serving in an American Red Cross initiative designed "to boost the morale of combat troops in Vietnam", the Supplemental Recreational Overseas Activities Program.

== Death ==
In 1986, he contracted Epstein Barr disease and was medically retired due to cardiomyopathy. He returned to live at the family ranch. In 1992, he relocated to Portland, Oregon to await the availability of a donor heart. After seven months, he underwent a heart transplant operation and died within days on April 30, 1993, when the donor heart proved to be defective.

== Memorials ==
The Hot LZ Memorial Wall in Weed, California, part of the Living Memorial Sculpture Garden, includes the names of veterans of conflicts since the Civil War. The center of the wall honors Cozzalio with a bronze portrait relief sculpture and a plaque listing his military commendations. The planning of the memorial wall began, after a memorial service held for Cozzalio at the garden May 5, 1993, yielded several donations in his honor. The wall was completed in 1994.

In the 2003 book Spinning Tails: Helicopter Stories, in relating a story of being shot down, Huey door gunner Johnny Hutcherson said "I can say Ace was the bravest man I ever knew".

In April 2019, Cozzalio was inducted into the Officer Candidate School Hall of Fame at the National Infantry Museum, honoring "OCS graduates who displayed outstanding service to the nation".

In 2020, he was added to the Army Aviation Association of America Hall of Fame. In addition to acknowledging his heroic wartime service, the association credited him for "being instrumental in developing scout tactics", assisting in "development of a combat aviation handbook for the Army" and said he "embodied the spirit of Army Aviation and Air Cavalry; past, present, and future".

== Posthumous Medal of Honor campaigning ==
An organization called "Friends of Ace" was formed to advocate that Cozzalio be posthumously awarded the Medal of Honor. As of April 2021, the effort has been endorsed by Senators Ted Cruz, Mike Rounds, Marsha Blackburn, and Tom Cotton, Congressmen Doug LaMalfa, Pete Gallego, and Bill Cassidy, Apollo astronaut William A. Anders, musician Lee Greenwood, General Tommy Franks, General Rudolph Ostovich, General Jeff Schloesser, General Dana T. Atkins, General Pat Brady, and many other officers of the US Army and Air Force, a dozen living members of the 5th Cavalry, 9th Infantry Division who were pinned down until Cozzalio destroyed the enemy machine gun bunker, and over fifty members of his unit, "Lighthorse Air Cavalry".
