= Isaac Singleton =

Isaac Singleton may refer to:

- Isaac Singleton (priest), Anglican priest
- Isaac C. Singleton Jr., American actor
