= Thomas Griffiths (priest) =

Thomas Elwyn Griffiths was a Welsh Anglican priest.

Griffiths was born in 1912 and educated at Oriel College, Oxford. He was ordained deacon in 1938, and priest in 1939. After a curacy at Carmarthen he was a minor canon at Brecon Cathedral. Griffiths held incumbencies at New Radnor and Bronllys. He was Archdeacon of Brecon from 1969 until 1978.

Church in Wales titles
Preceded by William Wilkinson	Archdeacon of Brecon; 1969–1978	Succeeded by Owain Jones
