= Harry Williams =

Harry Williams may refer to:

== Business ==
- Harry Palmerston Williams (1889–1936), American businessman
- Harry E. Williams, founder of the Williams Manufacturing Company
- Harry Williams, owner and operator of Hedonism Resorts
- Harry L. Williams, president and CEO of the Thurgood Marshall College Fund

== Music ==
- Harry Williams (songwriter) (1879–1922), American composer and lyricist
- Harry Williams (1927–1991), Aboriginal Australian singer who sung in the musical duo Harry and Wilga Williams
- Harry Williams (1944–2024), American singer of R&B band Bloodstone

== Sports ==
=== Association football ===
- Harry Williams (footballer, born 1875) (1875–?), English footballer with Small Heath
- Harry Williams (footballer, born 1883) (1883–?), English footballer with Bolton Wanderers, Burnley and Manchester United
- Harry Williams (footballer, born 1898) (1898–1980), English footballer with Sunderland, Chesterfield, Manchester United and Brentford
- Harry Williams (footballer, born 1929), English footballer
- Harry Williams (soccer, born 1951) (born 1951), Australian soccer player at the 1974 FIFA World Cup
- Harry Williams (footballer, born 1996), English footballer with Gloucester City
- Harry Williams (footballer, born 2002), English footballer with Walsall

=== Baseball ===
- Harry Williams (first baseman) (1890–1963), American baseball player for the New York Yankees c. 1913
- Harry Williams (third baseman), American Negro leagues baseball player
- Harry Williams (infielder) (1905–1964), American Negro leagues baseball player

=== Other sports ===
- Harry Williams (American football) (born 1982), American football wide receiver
- Harry Williams (cricketer) (1892–1967), English cricketer
- Harry Williams (golfer) (1915–1961), Australian golfer
- Harry Williams (rugby union) (born 1991), English rugby player with Exeter Chiefs

== Other ==
- Harry Williams (priest) (1919–2006), British monk and theologian, Dean of Trinity College, Cambridge
- Henry James "Harry" Williams, credited as co-writer of "It's a Long Way to Tipperary"
- T. Harry Williams (1909–1979), American historian based in Louisiana
- Harry Craven Williams, Welsh Anglican priest
- Harry Williams, television screenwriter and producer, see Harry and Jack Williams
- Enrique Ruíz-Williams (Harry Williams) (1922-1996), Cuban exile and member of the CIA and Brigade 2506

== See also ==
- Harry Gregson-Williams (born 1961), British composer, orchestrator, conductor and music producer
- Henry Williams (disambiguation)
- Harold Williams (disambiguation)
- Harrison Williams (disambiguation)
