= Randolph Thomas =

Welsh Anglican priest (born 1948)

(Alfred James) Randolph Thomas, (born 1948) is a Church in Wales priest who served as Archdeacon of Brecon from 2003 until 2013.

Thomas was educated at St David's College, Lampeter and ordained in 1971. After curacies in Kidwelly and Carmarthen he was Team Vicar of Aberystwyth from 1976 to 1981. He was at Betws-cum-Ammanford from 1981 until 1993; and Carmarthen from 1993 until 2002. He was Vicar of Bronllys from 2002 until 2006; and Priest in charge of Llanfrynach from 2006 until 2013. He is a Sub-Prelate of the Venerable Order of Saint John. Co founder of Cartrefi Cymru. Chair of Gwalia Housing Group 1998 to 2003. Non Executive Director of Hywel Dda Health Board 2008. Chair of University of Wales Trinity St. David 2016.Chair of University of Wales 2017.DD(honoris causa)UWTSD

Randolph married Jean Mary Gravell on the 1st of December 1973 and had three children Simon 1975 Stuart 1978 and Mathew 1984. Jean died on 29 June 2018 at the age of 67.

Church in Wales titles
Preceded by Elwyn Crebey John	Archdeacon of Brecon; 2003–2013	Succeeded by Alan Jevons
