= Dick Davis =

Dick Davis may refer to:

- Dick Davis (musician) (1917–1954), American tenor saxophonist who played with Eddie Calhoun
- Dick Davis (politician) (1921–1999), Lieutenant Governor of Virginia
- Dick Davis (defensive end) (1938–2021), American football defensive end
- Dick Davis (running back) (born 1946), American football running back
- Dick Davis (translator) (born 1945), British translator
- Dick Davis (baseball) (born 1953), American baseball player

== See also ==
- Dick Davies (1936–2012), American basketball player
- Dickie Davis (disambiguation)
- Richard Davis (disambiguation)
