= Wynford Rees =

Welsh Anglican Priest

(John) Wynford (Joshua) Rees (1924–2005) was a Welsh Anglican priest.

Rees was born in 1924 and educated at the University of Wales. He was ordained deacon in 1953, and priest in 1954. He was the incumbent at Llanyre from 1960. He was Archdeacon of Brecon from 1987 until 1994.

Church in Wales titles
Preceded by Owain Jones	Archdeacon of Brecon; 1987–1994	Succeeded by Brian James
