= Henry Williams =

Henry Williams may refer to:

== Politicians ==
- Henry Williams (activist) (born 2000), chief of staff of the Mike Gravel 2020 presidential campaign
- Henry Williams (MP for Northamptonshire) (died 1558), member of parliament (MP) for Northamptonshire
- Henry Williams (alias Cromwell) (died 1604), MP for Huntingdon
- Henry Cromwell (alias Williams) (c. 1566–1630), his son, MP for Huntingdon
- Henry Williams (died 1636) (c. 1579–1636), English politician who sat in the House of Commons at various times between 1601 and 1624
- Henry Williams (MP for Radnorshire), Welsh politician who sat in the House of Commons between 1654 and 1659
- Sir Henry Williams, 2nd Baronet (1635–1666), British member of parliament for Brecon and Breconshire
- Henry Williams (Massachusetts politician) (1805–1887), United States representative from Massachusetts
- Henry Williams (New Zealand politician) (1823–1907), member of the New Zealand Legislative Council
- Henry Williams (Victorian politician) (died 1910), Australian politician
- Henry D. Williams (1893–1934), American politician from New York
- Henry H. Williams (1813–1890), American politician from Iowa
- Henry Roberts Williams (1848–1935), Australian politician
- Henry Warren Williams (1816–1877), American jurist who was a justice of the Supreme Court of Pennsylvania from 1868 until his death in 1877
- Henry Warren Williams (1830–1899), American jurist who was a justice of the Supreme Court of Pennsylvania from 1887 until his death in 1899
- Henry Williams (Queensland politician) (1832–1871), Member of the Queensland Legislative Assembly

== Sportspeople ==
- Henry L. Williams (1869–1931), American college football player and coach
- Henry Williams (baseball) (1895–?), American Negro leagues baseball player
- Henry Williams (pitcher) (born 2001), American professional baseball player in the Kansas City Royals organization
- Henry Williams Jr. (1917–2002), American professional golfer
- Gizmo Williams (Henry L. Williams, born 1962), American player in the Canadian Football League
- Henry Williams (cricketer) (born 1967), South African cricketer
- Henry Williams (basketball) (1970–2018), American basketball player
- Henry Williams (American football) (born 1956), former professional American football player
- Henry Williams (sprinter) (born 1897), American sprinter, 220 yards winner at the 1919 USA Outdoor Track and Field Championships
- Henry Williams (sprinter, born 1945), American sprinter, 1965 and 1966 All-American for the Bowling Green Falcons track and field team

== Others ==
- Henry Williams (missionary) (1792–1867), English missionary to New Zealand
- Henry Harvey Williams (1917–2004), governor-general of Saint Vincent and the Grenadines
- Henry Horace Williams (1858–1940), American philosopher and university professor
- Henry Smith Williams (1863–1943), American medical doctor and author
- Henry Williams (bishop) (1872–1961), English Anglican bishop
- Henry Williams (Medal of Honor) (1834–1917), United States Navy seaman who received the Medal of Honor
- Henry Williams (soldier) (1918-1942), United States Army private killed by a bus driver in Mobile, Alabama
- Henry Shaler Williams (1847–1918), American geologist
- Henry Sylvester Williams (1869–1911), lawyer, councillor and writer
- Rubberlegs Williams (Henry Williams, 1907–1962), American blues/jazz singer and dancer
- Henry Williams (Casualty), a fictional character from the BBC television drama Casualty, played by Tom Chadbon
- Henry Williams (priest) (fl. 1510s - 1550s), Canon of Windsor
- Henry F. Williams (1813–c. 1903), African-American composer
- Henry Howell Williams (1796–1873), American merchant
- Henry John Williams (1838–1919), English priest and activist
- Henry Meade Williams (1899–1984), American writer, editor, publisher, and bookstore owner
- J. Henry Williams (1831–1889), American Episcopal priest and philanthropist
- Henry Thomas Hadley Williams (1864-1932), Canadian surgeon
- Henry Williams, the plaintiff of Williams v. Mississippi

== See also ==
- Harry Williams (disambiguation)
- Henry Williams Baker (1821–1877), hymn writer
