= Peter Brooke =

Peter Brooke may refer to:

- Peter Brooke, Baron Brooke of Sutton Mandeville (1934–2023), British politician
- Peter Brooke (17th-century MP) (1602–1685), English politician
- Peter Brooke (businessman) (1929–2020), American businessman

== See also ==
- Peter Brook (disambiguation)
- Peter Brooks (disambiguation)
