= Edward Edwards (archdeacon of Brecon) =

Welsh Anglican priest

Edward Edwards was a Welsh Anglican priest in the late 18th and early 19th centuries. He was archdeacon of Brecon from 1763 until 1805.
