= Elwyn John =

Welsh Anglican priest (1936–2013)

Elwyn Crebey John (18 March 1936 – 21 August 2013) was a Church in Wales priest, most notably Archdeacon of Brecon from 1999 until 2003.

He was educated at St David's College, Lampeter and ordained in 1960. After curacies in Pontardawe and Llandrindod Wells he was Vicar of Beguildy from 1966 to 1979. He was at Builth from 1979 until 1985; and Brecon from 1985 until 2001.

Church in Wales titles
Preceded by Brian James	Archdeacon of Brecon; 1999–2003	Succeeded by Randolph Thomas
