= John Thomas (priest, born 1891) =

Welsh Anglican priest (1891–1959)

John Lloyd Thomas (9 March 1891 – 22 July 1959) was a Welsh Anglican priest in the 20th century and Archdeacon of Brecon from 1958 to 1959.

Thomas was educated at St David's College, Lampeter. After curacies at Llandybie and Llangyfelach he was vicar of Cockett from 1926. He was also treasurer of Brecon Cathedral.
