= William Wilkinson (priest) =

William David George Wilkinson was an Anglican priest.

Wilkinson was born in 1897 and educated at Jesus College, Oxford. He was ordained deacon in 1920, and priest in 1921. After a curacy at Pembroke Dock he held incumbencies at Crickhowell, Landore and Oystermouth. He was Archdeacon of Brecon from 1955 to 1969.

Church in Wales titles
Preceded by Richard Cole-Hamilton	Archdeacon of Brecon; 1955–1969	Succeeded by Thomas Griffiths
