= Henry Stewart (archdeacon of Brecon) =

Welsh Anglican priest (1873–1960)

Henry John Stewart (2 March 1873 – 2 May 1960) was a Welsh Anglican priest.

Stewart was born in Lampeter and educated at St David's College there. He was ordained deacon in 1896, and priest in 1897. After curacies in Llandysul and Llansamlet he held incumbencies at Llangorwen, Cockett, Sketty and Builth. He was Archdeacon of Brecon from 1941 to 1947.

Church in Wales titles
Preceded by Henry Church Jones	Archdeacon of Brecon; 1941–1947	Succeeded by Richard Cole-Hamilton
