= Allison Brooks =

United States Air Force general

Allison C. Brooks
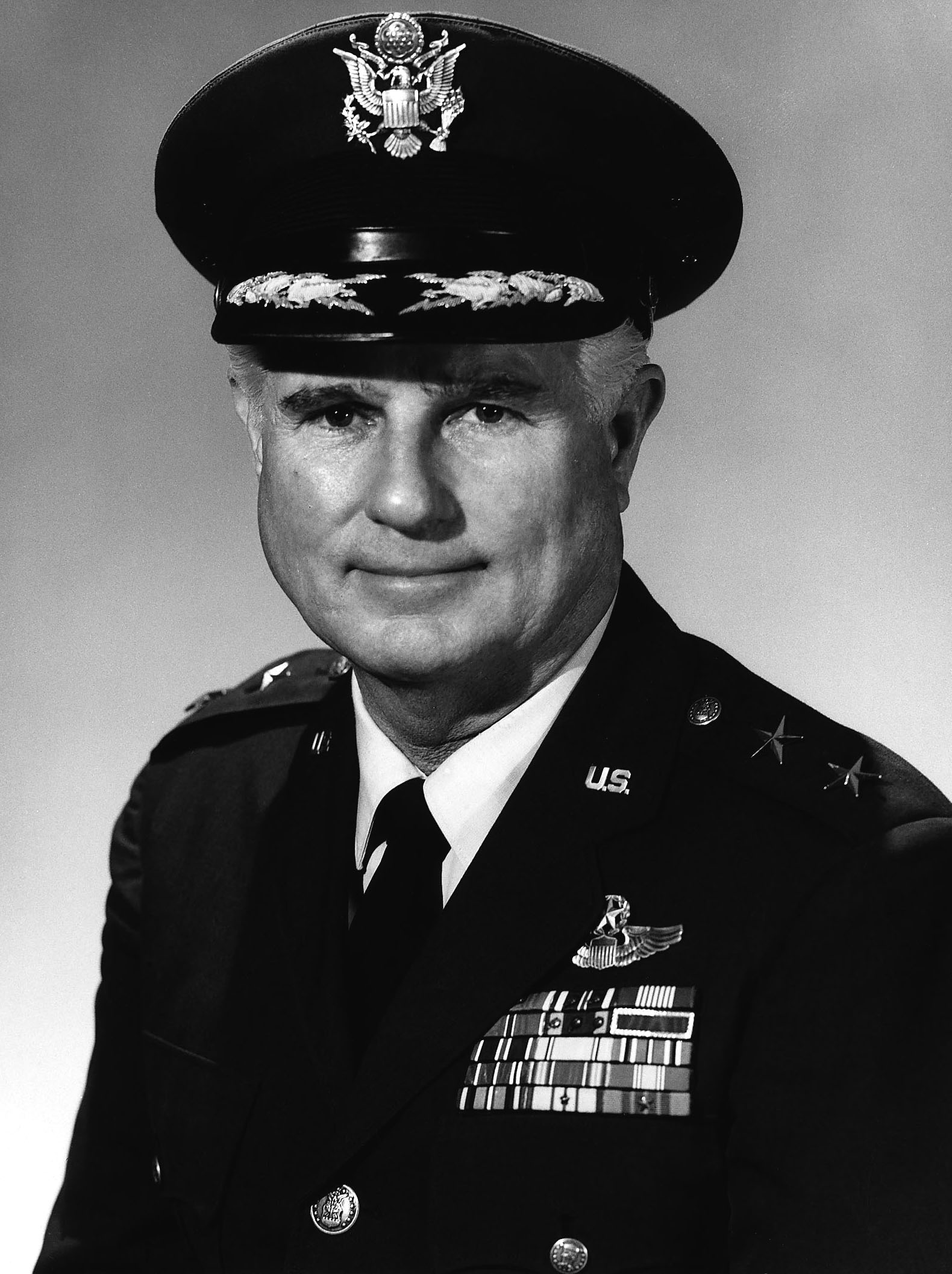
- Official Air Force portrait
- Born: June 26, 1917; Pittsburgh, Pennsylvania
- Died: December 9, 2006 (aged 89); Sequim, Washington
- Military career
- Allegiance: United States of America
- Branch: United States Air Force
- Service years: 1939–1971
- Rank: Major general
- Awards: Legion of Merit (2); Distinguished Flying Cross (3); Bronze Star; Croix de Guerre

Allison C. Brooks (June 26, 1917 – December 9, 2006) was a United States Air Force aviator who piloted both the Boeing B-17 Flying Fortress and North American P-51 Mustang aircraft in combat missions over Nazi Germany during World War II. In the Vietnam War, he flew Lockheed C-130 Hercules aircraft in combat support missions. In addition to earning numerous military decorations, he was ultimately promoted to the rank of major general and served in active duty until 1971.

== Early life and career ==
Brooks was born in Pittsburgh, Pennsylvania, in 1917. He attended high school in Pasadena, California, and earned his Bachelor of Science degree from the University of California, Berkeley in 1938. He enlisted a year later as an aviation cadet in the United States Army Air Corps and graduated from Kelly Field in 1940 with a commission as second lieutenant and his pilot wings.

His first assignment after graduation was as an instructor with the Air Training Command at Randolph Air Force Base in Texas. In 1943, he went overseas to the European Theater of Operations as operations officer of the 401st Bombardment Group. He was next assigned as executive officer and later as commander of the 1st Air Division Fighter Scouting Force, which flew P-51 aircraft. During World War II, he flew 65 combat missions for a total of 310 hours in the B-17 and P-51 aircraft. He participated in the campaigns of Air Offensive, Europe; Normandy; Northern France; Rhineland; Ardennes-Alsace; and Central Europe. He commanded an August 1944 raid by the 401st Bombardment Group on a V-weapons factory that was adjacent to the inmate barracks at the Buchenwald concentration camp.

== Post World War II ==
Brooks was a graduate of the Air Command and Staff School and served as an instructor in air operations at the U.S. Army Command and General Staff College at Fort Leavenworth, Kansas. In 1951, he returned to Maxwell Air Force Base, Alabama, as a student in the Air War College.

Brooks was assigned to various units of the Military Airlift Command since June 1952, with the exception of a one-year tour of duty from January 1964 to March 1965 in Southeast Asia as deputy commander, 2nd Air Division.

In June 1952, he was assigned as operations staff officer, 1300th Air Base Wing, at Mountain Home Air Force Base, Idaho. In September 1952, he was assigned duties as deputy commander of 1602nd Air Transport Wing, Fürstenfeldbruck Air Base, Germany. In July 1955, he assumed command of the 1602nd Air Transport Wing.

He returned to the United States in September 1955 and was assigned to Headquarters Military Airlift Command, Andrews Air Force Base, Maryland, as chief of manpower and organization, and in June 1957, he assumed duties as assistant deputy chief of staff for operations. In August 1960, Brooks was reassigned as commander of 62nd Troop Carrier Wing, McChord Air Force Base, Washington. In January 1964 he went to Tan Son Nhut Air Base, Republic of Vietnam, as deputy commander of 2nd Air Division. During his tour of duty in Southeast Asia, he flew 31 missions in combat support operations.

In March 1965, Brooks assumed command of the Aerospace Rescue and Recovery Service (Military Airlift Command) with headquarters at Orlando Air Force Base, Florida. The headquarters was transferred to Scott Air Force Base, Illinois, in 1968.

== Later life ==
In 1966, at Edwards Air Force Base, Brooks was the first to fly an experimental device attached to an HC-130H called the Fulton surface-to-air recovery system. This demonstrated the effectiveness of recovering personnel on the ground if they could launch a helium-filled balloon. The balloon tether cable was snatched by the V-shaped apparatus which was mounted on the nose of the aircraft.

Brooks assumed duty as deputy director for inspection services, Office of the Assistant Secretary of Defense (Administration), Washington, D.C., in April 1970. He retired from active duty on July 1, 1971.

His military decorations include the Legion of Merit with oak leaf cluster, Distinguished Flying Cross with two oak leaf clusters, Air Medal with eight oak leaf clusters, Soldier's Medal, Bronze Star, Small Arms Expert Marksmanship Ribbon, and French Croix de Guerre. He was promoted to the temporary grade of major general effective February 24, 1970, with date of rank on August 10, 1965.

In 2002, General Brooks was interviewed on the subject of whether President Franklin D. Roosevelt should have ordered the bombing of the Nazi death camps during World War II.

General Brooks died in Sequim, Washington, on December 9, 2006.
