= Combating Terrorism Center =

U.S. Military Academy institution, focusing on counterterrorism

Combating Terrorism Center at West Point
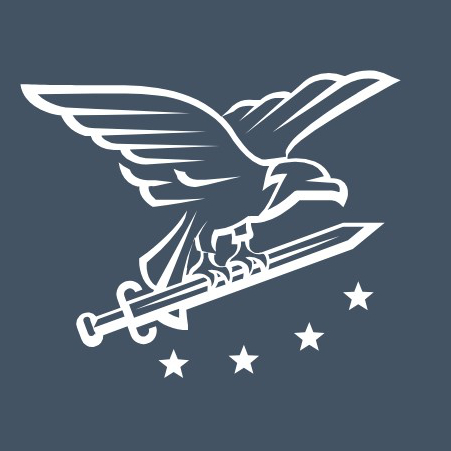
- Established: 20 February 2003; 23 years ago
- Location: Lincoln Hall, West Point, NY
- Chair: GEN (R) Joseph Votel
- Director: COL Sean Morrow
- Affiliations: United States Military Academy
- Website: ctc.westpoint.edu

The Combating Terrorism Center is an academic institution at the United States Military Academy (USMA) in West Point, New York, that provides education, research and policy analysis in the specialty areas of terrorism, counterterrorism, homeland security, and internal conflict. Established with private funding in 2003, it operates under the aegis of the Department of Social Sciences of the USMA.

== History ==
At the time of the attacks on the United States on 11 September 2001, West Point's counterterrorism curriculum consisted of a single elective class. In order to fill this gap and provide greater educational resources in terrorism-related issues, the academy welcomed the creation of the Combating Terrorism Center and included it in its Department of Social Sciences on 20 February 2003. Though thus a part of the United States Military Academy, the CTC was established with private funding and is an independent research group. Primary funding for the founding of the CTC was contributed by Vincent Viola, a 1977 graduate of the United States Military Academy and former chairman of the New York Mercantile Exchange; significant initial support was also provided by Ross Perot, George Gilmore Jr. and Major (ret.) George Gilmore Sr. The center's first Distinguished Chair was General (Retired) Wayne A. Downing until his death in 2007. General (Retired) Joseph Votel presently holds the Distinguished Chair. The current director, COL Sean Morrow, began his tenure in January 2021.

== Research and analysis products ==
In addition to providing counterterrorism education, the CTC also regularly publishes a wide range of analyses and reports in its subject-specialty areas. Some of the most significant and large-scale of these research and analysis products are detailed below.

The Militant Ideology Atlas used citation analysis to provide the first systematic mapping of the ideologues most influential in the global jihadi movement. Analyzing the most downloaded jihadi literature from one of al-Qa'ida's online libraries and cataloging more than 11,000 citations from these texts, the Militant Ideology Atlas found that the most influential living jihadi thinkers are not – as is commonly supposed – senior leaders of al-Qa'ida itself, but rather a handful of primarily Saudi and Jordanian clerics; the most widely cited writer is the Palestinian-Jordanian Abu Muhammad al-Maqdisi. The Atlas was published in November 2006.

Harmony Database Reports are works of analysis and policy recommendation produced by the CTC on the basis of documents declassified for this purpose by the Defense Department from the latter's Harmony Database, which houses al-Qa'ida-related documents captured throughout the world in the course of the war on terror. The CTC's first Harmony report, Harmony and Disharmony: Exploiting al-Qa'ida's Organizational Vulnerabilities, was published in February 2006 and, along with extensive analysis, made primary source documents from the Harmony Database available to the public for the first time. According to the CTC, Harmony and Disharmony "includes a theoretically informed analysis of potential opportunities to exploit al-Qa'ida's network vulnerabilities, a case study of jihadi operational failure, and specific recommendations for effectively addressing the evolving al-Qa'ida threat." The CTC's second major Harmony report focussed on the Horn of Africa. Released in May 2007 al-Qa'ida's (Mis)Adventures in the Horn of Africa. provides a detailed picture of al-Qa'ida's efforts to establish itself in East Africa, what its successes and failures were in the region, and how conditions in weak and failed states affect the ability of jihadi groups to function. The report also included a second batch of declassified documents from the Harmony Database, with full English translations, and in-depth profiles of key figures and groups. The entire report can be downloaded. The third Harmony report explores al-Qa'ida's internal conflicts over the course of its history. Released in October 2007, Cracks in the Foundation: Leadership Schisms in al-Qa'ida from 1989–2006 analyzes further declassified Harmony documents in order to tease out the issues that have divided al-Qa'ida's leadership and details the factions that have struggled for control of the organization.

Islamic Imagery Project published the first complete catalog of important, recurring images used in violent jihadi propaganda with explanations to enhance the understanding for students, teachers, and policy makers.

== CTC Sentinel ==
CTC Sentinel is a monthly, interdisciplinary journal that covers research and news. The Atlantic describes it as "a leading practitioner-oriented journal on terrorism and counterterrorism issues."
