= Peter Brooks =

Peter Brooks may refer to:

- Peter Brooks (cyclist) (born 1970), Australian Paralympic cyclist
- Peter Brooks (priest) (born 1955), Welsh Anglican priest
- Peter Brooks (writer) (born 1938), professor of comparative literature at Yale University
- Peter Chardon Brooks (1767–1849), American merchant

== See also ==
- Peter Brooke (disambiguation)
- Peter Brookes (born 1943), English cartoonist
