= Melbourne Kimsey =

United States Air Force general (1930–2021)

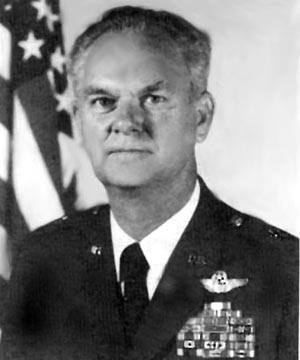
- Born: October 16, 1930; Danielsville, Georgia U.S.
- Died: August 4, 2021 (aged 90)
- Military career
- Allegiance: United States
- Branch: United States Air Force
- Service years: 1946–1949,1953-1983
- Rank: Brigadier general
- Commands: Vice commander, Cheyenne Mountain Complex, 97th Bombardment Wing, Blytheville Air Force Base, Ark, 340th Consolidated Aircraft Maintenance Wing at U-Tapao,306th Tactical Fighter Squadron, Tuy Hoa, 428th Tactical Fighter Squadron,

Melbourne Kimsey (October 16, 1930 – August 4, 2021) was a brigadier general in the United States Air Force who served as director of the Cheyenne Mountain Complex from 1981 to 1983,

== Biography ==
Melbourne Kimsey was born on October 16, 1930, in Danielsville, Georgia. He enlisted in the Army Air Corps in 1946 at the age of 15 and a half, and served 3 years as enlisted and non-commissioned officer. Rather than re-enlist in 1949, using the GI Bill he entered the University of Georgia and the ROTC program there. He received his Bachelor of Science degree in 1953 from the University of Georgia, and as a distinguished military graduate of the ROTC program, was commissioned a second lieutenant in the U.S. Air Force. He received a Regular Air Force commission in 1954. He received his Master of Science degree from George Washington University in 1966 and is a graduate of Squadron Officer School, 1962; Air Command and Staff College, 1966; and the Air War College, 1979

Kimsey entered active duty in July 1953 and graduated from pilot training at Reese Air Force Base, Texas, in 1954. He served with the Strategic Air Command as a KC-97 pilot at March Air Force Base, California, until October 1956. While there he distinguished himself when a fire broke out during take-off in a KC-97 he was piloting. While the plane was burning, he brought the aircraft under control and crawled back to pull out two of his crew members. He was awarded the Soldier's Medal for valor (the Air Force Cross had not yet been instituted). He was then assigned to the U.S. Air Force in Europe as a pilot flying B-45s, B-66s, T-33s and L-20s at the USAF Base at Alconbury, England (later the RAF Alconbury). He personally led the B-66's transfer from stateside to their assignment in England.

In 1959 General Kimsey transferred to the 23rd Bombardment Squadron at Travis Air Force Base, Calif., as a B-52 aircraft commander and squadron operations officer. After graduating from Air Command and Staff College he was assigned to the U.S. Air Force Academy, Colo., as an Air Officer Commanding. While there he was active in the pilot training programs as an instructor in soaring and he served as president of the aero club.

Transferring to Tactical Air Command in August 1968, he served as operations officer for the 428th Tactical Fighter Squadron, Nellis Air Force Base, Nev. From May 1970 to June 1971, Then Lt Col Kimsey flew 211 combat sorties and 317 hours in F-100s and became commander of the 306th Tactical Fighter Squadron, Tuy Hoa Air Base, Republic of Vietnam, and later assistant deputy commander for operations, 35th Tactical Fighter Wing, Phan Rang Air Base, Republic of Vietnam.

Kimsey returned from Southeast Asia to SAC headquarters at Offutt Air Force Base, Nebraska, as chief of Bases and Units Division, Office of the Deputy Chief of Staff, Plans. In June 1972 he become deputy commander for maintenance and later vice commander of the 509th Bombardment Wing, Pease Air Force Base, N.H. He served as commander of the 340th Consolidated Aircraft Maintenance Wing at U-Tapao Royal Thai Naval Airfield, Thailand, until December 1973. Upon his return to the United States, he was assigned to the Directorate of Plans, Office of the Deputy Chief of Staff, Plans and Operations, Headquarters U.S. Air Force, Washington, D.C., as chief of the Strategic Forces Division and subsequently as the assistant deputy director for force development. He was responsible for the planning and long-range development of U.S. Air Force.

In October 1976 General Kimsey was assigned to 8th Air Force as commander of the 97th Bombardment Wing, Blytheville Air Force Base, Arkansas. He led the wing charged with maintaining a strategic strike force of B-52 bombers and a global air refueling commitment with KC-135 tankers. He was active in civilian community affairs there in Blytheville as well. His next assignment was as deputy director of programs, Office of the Deputy Chief of Staff, Programs and Evaluation, at Air Force headquarters in September 1978. His primary responsibility was to chair the Program Review Committee and to develop the Air Force program for the Chief of Staff and Secretary of the Air Force for presentation to the Secretary of Defense for development of the Air Force and subsequent Defense Department Five Year Development Plan. The general later was assigned as chief of tactical systems, research and engineering at the National Security Agency, Fort George G. Meade, Md., in September 1980, In September 1981 he became vice commander of NORAD in Cheyenne Mountain, Colorado, where he retired in 1983.

Kimsey was promoted to brigadier general March 1, 1978, with date of rank February 28, 1978.

Kimsey died on August 4, 2021, at the age of 90.

== Awards and decorations ==
His decorations included the Air Force Distinguished Service Medal, Legion of Merit with two oak leaf clusters, the Distinguished Flying Cross, the Soldier's Medal, the Bronze Star Medal, the Air Medal with eleven oak leaf clusters, the Air Force Commendation Medal with three oak leaf clusters, Presidential Unit Citation with oak leaf cluster, Air Force Outstanding Unit Award with three oak leaf clusters, Combat Readiness Medal, Good Conduct Medal, World War II Victory Medal, National Defense Service Medal with bronze and silver stars,Vietnam Service Medal with three bronze stars, Air Force Longevity Service Award with six oak leaf clusters, Expert Small Arms Marksmanship ribbon, and Gallantry Cross with palm (South Vietnam), and Vietnam Campaign Medal. and command pilot wings.

- Air Force Distinguished Service Medal
- Legion of Merit with two oak leaf clusters
- Distinguished Flying Cross
- Soldier's Medal
- Bronze Star
- Air Medal with eleven oak leaf clusters
- Commendation Medal with three oak leaf clusters
- Presidential Unit Citation with oak leaf cluster
- Air Force Outstanding Unit Award with three oak leaf clusters
- Combat Readiness Medal
- Good Conduct Medal
- World War II Victory Medal
- National Defense Service Medal with bronze star
- Vietnam Service Medal with three bronze stars
- Air Force Longevity Service Award with six oak leaf clusters
- Marksmanship ribbon
- Gallantry Cross (South Vietnam)
- Vietnam Campaign Medal
