= Dickie Davis =

Dickie Davis may refer to:

- Dickie Davis (footballer) (1922–1999), English footballer who played for Sunderland and Darlington
- Dickie Davis (British Army officer) (born 1962), British general
- Dickie Davis (cricketer) (1966–2003), English cricketer

== See also ==
- Dickie Davies (1928–2023), British television presenter
- Dick Davis (disambiguation)
- Richard Davis (disambiguation)
