= Richard Cole-Hamilton =

Richard Mervyn Cole-Hamilton (14 December 1877 – 1959) was an Anglican priest.

Cole-Hamilton was born in Scaldwell on 14 December 1877, son of Rev. Arthur Henry Cole-Hamilton (1846–1889), rector of Castle Ashby, Northamptonshire, and Harriet Elizabeth (died 1913), daughter of John Tisdall. The Cole-Hamiltons descend from Arthur Cole-Hamilton, a younger son of the Irish politician John Cole, 1st Baron Mountflorence, whose eldest son and heir, William, was created Earl of Enniskillen. A great-grandson is the Scottish politician Alex Cole-Hamilton.

Cole-Hamilton was educated at Worcester College, Oxford (BA 1901, MA 1903), and was ordained deacon in 1902, and priest in 1903. He was a temporary Chaplain in the Armed Forces from 1915 to 1916, and Canon of Brecon in 1941. After curacies in Alfreton and Llansamlet he held incumbencies at Stokesay and Llangattock. He was Archdeacon of Brecon from 1947 to 1955.

Church in Wales titles
Preceded by Henry Stewart	Archdeacon of Brecon; 1947–1955	Succeeded by William Wilkinson
