= Henry Church Jones =

Church in Wales priest (1870–1941)

Henry James Church Jones (30 August 1870 – 18 January 1941) was a Church in Wales priest, most notably Archdeacon of Brecon from 1923 until 1939.

Church Jones was born at Aberporth and educated at Christ College, Brecon and St John's College, Oxford. He was ordained deacon in 1893, and priest in 1894. After a curacy in Brecon he was Vicar of Battle from 1904 to 1919; and a Canon at Brecon Cathedral from 1919 to 1923.

Church in Wales titles
Preceded by Edward Bevan	Archdeacon of Brecon; 1923–1939	Succeeded by Henry Stewart
