= Harrison Williams =

Harrison Williams may refer to:

- Harrison A. Williams (1919–2001), U.S. Senator from New Jersey
- Harrison Williams (entrepreneur) (1873–1953), American entrepreneur who made millions in public utilities
- Harrison Williams (decathlete) (born 1996), American athlete

== See also ==
- Harry Williams (disambiguation)
