= Isaac Singleton (priest) =

Isaac Singleton was an Anglican priest.

Singleton was born in London and educated at Brasenose College, Oxford. He held livings at Whitchurch, Oxfordshire, Bleddfa, Great Salkeld and Crosthwaite.He was appointed a Canon of St Pauls in 1614; was Archdeacon of Brecon from 1620 to 1623; and Archdeacon of Carlisle from 1623 to 1643.
