= David Thomas (cricketer, born 1911) =

Welsh cricketer

Personal information
- Full name: David John Thomas
- Born: 25 November 1911; Swansea, Glamorgan, Wales
- Died: 19 September 2001 (aged 89); Swansea, Glamorgan, Wales
- Batting: Right-handed
- Bowling: Slow left arm orthodox

Domestic team information
- Years: Team
- 1932: Glamorgan

Career statistics
Competition	FC
Matches	1
Runs scored	10
Batting average	–
100s/50s	–/–
Top score	10*
Balls bowled	102
Wickets	–
Bowling average	–
5 wickets in innings	–
10 wickets in match	–
Best bowling	–
Catches/stumpings	–/–
- Source: Cricinfo, 3 July 2010

David John Thomas (25 November 1911 – 19 September 2001) was a Welsh cricketer. Thomas was a right-handed batsman who bowled slow left arm orthodox. He was born at Swansea, Glamorgan. Thomas was educated at Swansea University.

Thomas played a single first-class match for Glamorgan in the 1932 County Championship against Northamptonshire at St. Helen's, Swansea. In the match he scored 10* in his only first-class innings, leaving him without a career batting average. The success of fellow slow left arm orthodox spinners Wilf Jones and Emrys Davies meant Thomas' services were not called upon again.

Thomas died at the town of his birth on 19 September 2001.
