= Richard Davies (archdeacon of Brecon) =

Welsh Anglican priest (1777-1859)

Richard Davies (c.1777–1859) was a Welsh Anglican priest in the 19th century.

Davies was born in Brecknockshire and educated at Christ Church, Oxford. He was Archdeacon of Brecon from 1805 to 1859. He was succeeded in the post by Richard William Davies.

His papers are held at Powys Archives and Information Management.

== Publications ==
Sermons &c. Addressed to the Inhabitants of the Parishes of Saint John the Evangelist, and Saint Mary, in Brecon. WITH Four Sermons. On Subjects connected with the Combined Attack, Now Making by the Advocates of Sedition and Blasphemy. (1815)
