= Peter Brook (rugby union) =

English rugby union player

- Full name: Peter Watts Pitt Brook
- Born: 21 September 1906 Thornton Heath, England
- Died: 6 August 1992 (aged 85) Bristol, England
- School: Whitgift School
- University: Emmanuel College
- Occupation: Clergy

Rugby union career
- Position: Back-row
International career
Years	Team	Apps	(Points)
1930–36	England	3	(0)

Reverend Peter Watts Pitt Brook (21 September 1906 – 6 August 1992) was a Church of England priest and England international rugby union player of the 1930s.

Raised in south London, Brook was educated at Whitgift School and Emmanuel College, Cambridge.

Brook, a back-row forward, gained four rugby blues at Cambridge University from 1928 to 1931. He won three England caps in sporadic appearances during the 1930s, while playing his club rugby for Harlequins. At the end of his England career in 1936, Brook was appointed a chaplain at Clifton College.

In World War II, Brook served as a chaplain with the 14th Army in Burma.

Brook helped produced three England captains through his involvement in Clifton College rugby and after retiring was involved in local politics, as a Avon County Council and Bristol city councillor.

== See also ==
- List of England national rugby union players
