= Wayne A. Downing =

United States Army general (1940–2007)

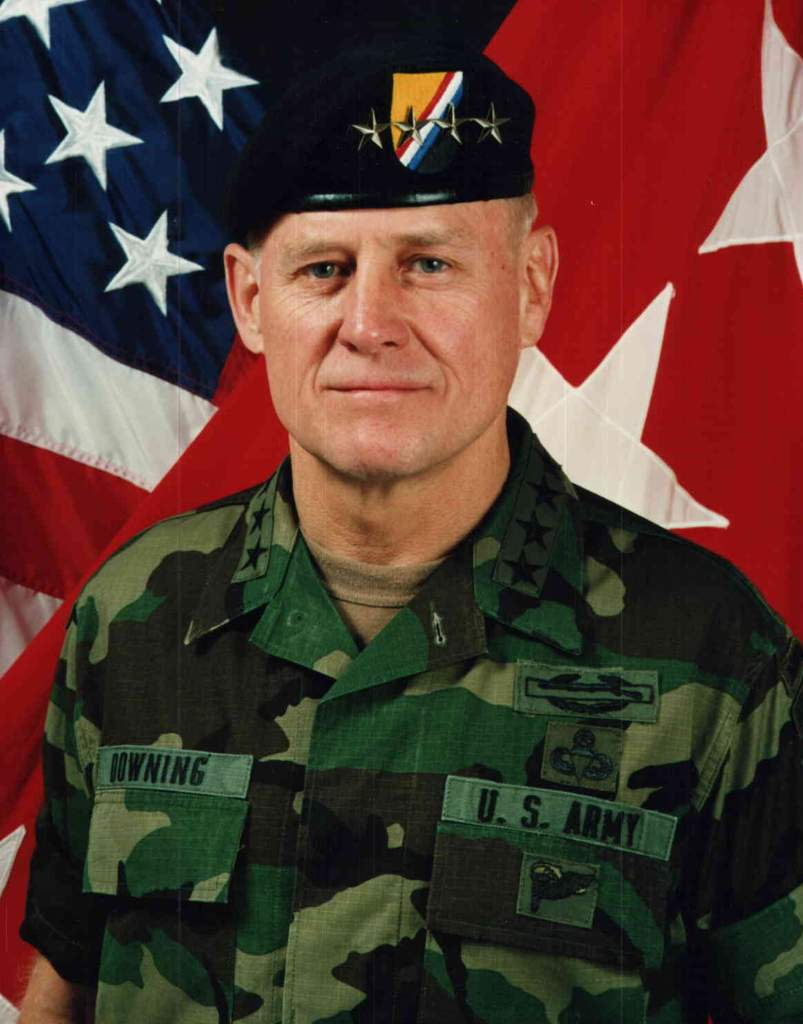
- General Wayne A. Downing

1st United States Deputy National Security Advisor for Combatting Terrorism
- In office 1 October 2001 – 1 October 2002
- President: George W. Bush
- Leader: Condoleezza Rice
- Preceded by: Position established
- Succeeded by: Position abolished

Personal details
- Born: 10 May 1940 Peoria, Illinois, U.S.
- Died: 18 July 2007 (aged 67) Peoria, Illinois, U.S.
- Resting place: West Point Cemetery, New York
- Known for: Military analyst for NBC News

Military service
- Allegiance: United States
- Branch/service: United States Army
- Years of service: 1962–1996
- Rank: General
- Commands: United States Special Operations Command; United States Army Special Operations Command; Joint Special Operations Command; 75th Ranger Regiment
- Battles/wars: Vietnam War; Gulf War
- Awards: Defense Distinguished Service Medal (2); Army Distinguished Service Medal (2); Silver Star (2); Defense Superior Service Medal; Legion of Merit (4); Soldier's Medal; Bronze Star Medal (6); Purple Heart

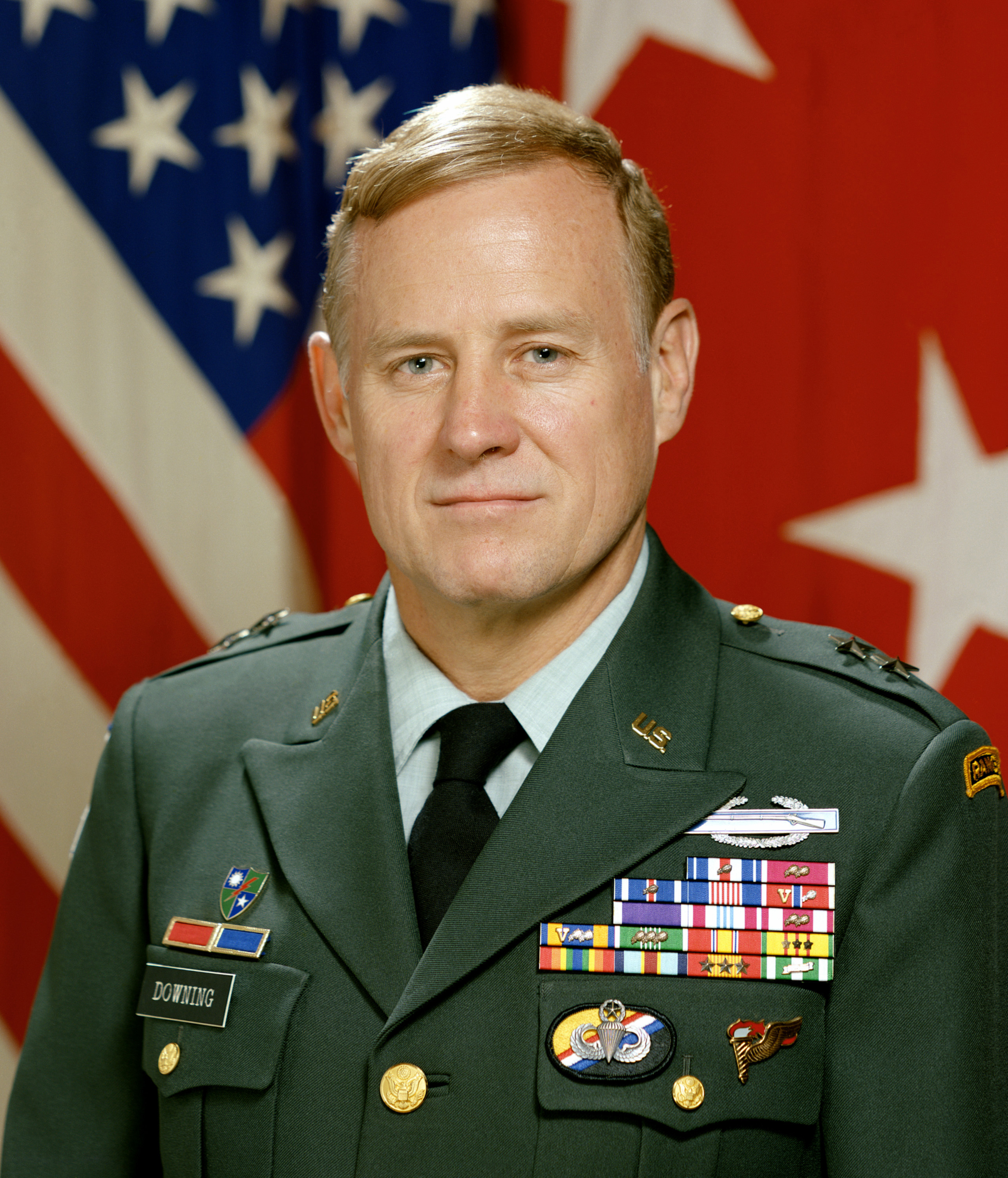
Wayne A. Downing as Major General, 1988

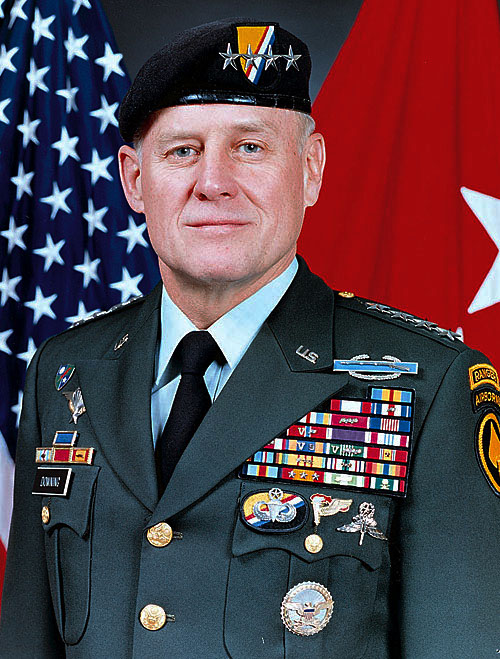
GEN Wayne A. Downing in his service uniform

Wayne Allan Downing (10 May 1940 – 18 July 2007) was a four-star United States Army general born in Peoria, Illinois. He graduated from the United States Military Academy with a Bachelor of Science degree in 1962 and held a Master of Business Administration degree from Tulane University. He also served on the board of directors at a US Government focused high-tech company, Science Applications International Corporation (SAIC).

== Military career ==
- Sep 62 – Feb 63 Student, Infantry Officer Basic and Ranger Course
- Apr 63 – Jun 64 Platoon Leader, 173rd Airborne Brigade (Separate)
- Jun 64 – Sep 64 Liaison Officer, 173rd Airborne Brigade (Separate)
- Dec 64 – Oct 65 Aide-de-Camp to the Commanding General, 173rd Airborne Brigade, Vietnam
- Oct 65 – Apr 66 S-2/S-5 (Intel/Civil Affairs) Officer, 173rd Airborne Brigade, Vietnam
- Apr 66 – Aug 67 Instructor, Infantry School, Fort Benning, GA
- Aug 67 – Jan 68 Company Commander, Infantry Training Center, Fort Benning, GA
- Jan 68 – Sep 68 Student, Infantry Officer Advance Course, Infantry School, Fort Benning, GA
- Sep 68 – Dec 68 Company Commander, 25th Infantry Division, Vietnam
- Dec 68 – Sep 69 Battalion S-3 (Operations) Officer, 25th Infantry Division, Vietnam
- Sep 69 – Oct 69 Brigade S-3 (Operations) Officer, 25th Infantry Division, Vietnam
- Dec 69 – Jan 72 Graduate Student, Tulane University, New Orleans, LA
- Feb 72 – Jun 72 Student, Armed Forces Staff College, Norfolk, VA
- Jun 72 – Feb 75 Senior Operations / Systems Analyst, Office of the Secretary of Defense, Washington, D.C.
- Mar 75 – Dec 76 Battalion S-3 Officer / Executive Officer, 75th Infantry (Ranger), Fort Stewart, GA
- Dec 76 – Mar 77 Commander, Task Force (Alaska), 24th Infantry Division, Fort Stewart, GA
- May 77 – Jul 79 Commander, 2nd Battalion (Ranger), 75th Infantry, Fort Lewis, WA
- Aug 79 – May 80 Student, Air War College, Maxwell Air Force Base, AL
- Jun 80 – Apr 82 Secretary to Joint Staff, European Command, Vaihingen, Germany
- May 82 – Apr 84 Commander, 3rd Brigade, 1st Armored Division, U.S. Army Europe, Germany
- May 84 – Nov 85 Commander, 75th Infantry Regiment (Ranger) which was converted to 75th Ranger Regiment, Fort Benning, GA
- Nov 85 – Jun 87 Deputy Commanding General, 1st Special Operations Command, Fort Bragg, NC
- Jun 87 – May 88 Director, Washington Office, United States Special Operations Command, MacDill Air Force Base, FL
- May 88 – Dec 89 Deputy Chief of Staff (Training), U.S. Army Training and Doctrine Command, Fort Monroe, VA
- Dec 89 – Aug 91 Commanding General, Joint Special Operations Command, U.S. Special Operations Command, Fort Bragg, NC
- Aug 91 – Apr 93 Commanding General, U.S. Army Special Operations Command, Fort Bragg, NC
- May 93 – Feb 96 Commander-in-Chief, U.S. Special Operations Command (SOCOM), MacDill Air Force Base, FL

== Post-9/11 ==
In 2001, Downing came out of retirement to coordinate the national campaign "to detect, disrupt and destroy global terrorist organizations and those who support them." He held the title of National Director and Deputy National Security Advisor for combating terrorism. He reported to then-National Security Advisor Condoleezza Rice and Homeland Security director Tom Ridge. From 2003 until his death he held the Distinguished Chair at the Combating Terrorism Center at West Point.

Downing was formerly a director of Metal Storm and a senior executive with Science Applications International Corporation (SAIC). He also performed various speaking engagements.

Besides working for the US government in his retiree years, he also worked for NBC News as a military analyst.

In 2006, he received the United States Military Academy's 2006 Distinguished Graduate Award.

Downing died on 18 July 2007, of meningitis and was buried in the West Point Cemetery, West Point, New York on 27 September 2007. His grave is just north of the main cemetery building.

On 24 September 2008, the Metropolitan Authority of Peoria voted unanimously to change the name of the Greater Peoria Regional Airport to the "General Wayne A. Downing Peoria International Airport".

== Awards and decorations ==
Downing's awards and decorations include:

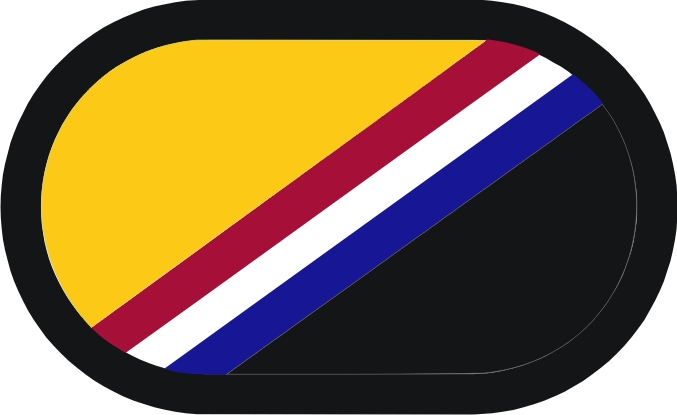

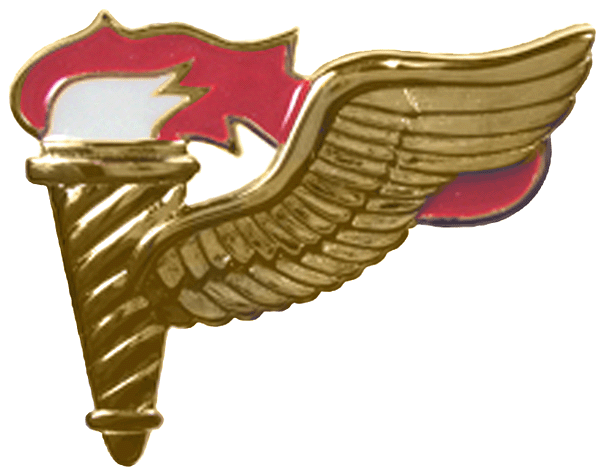

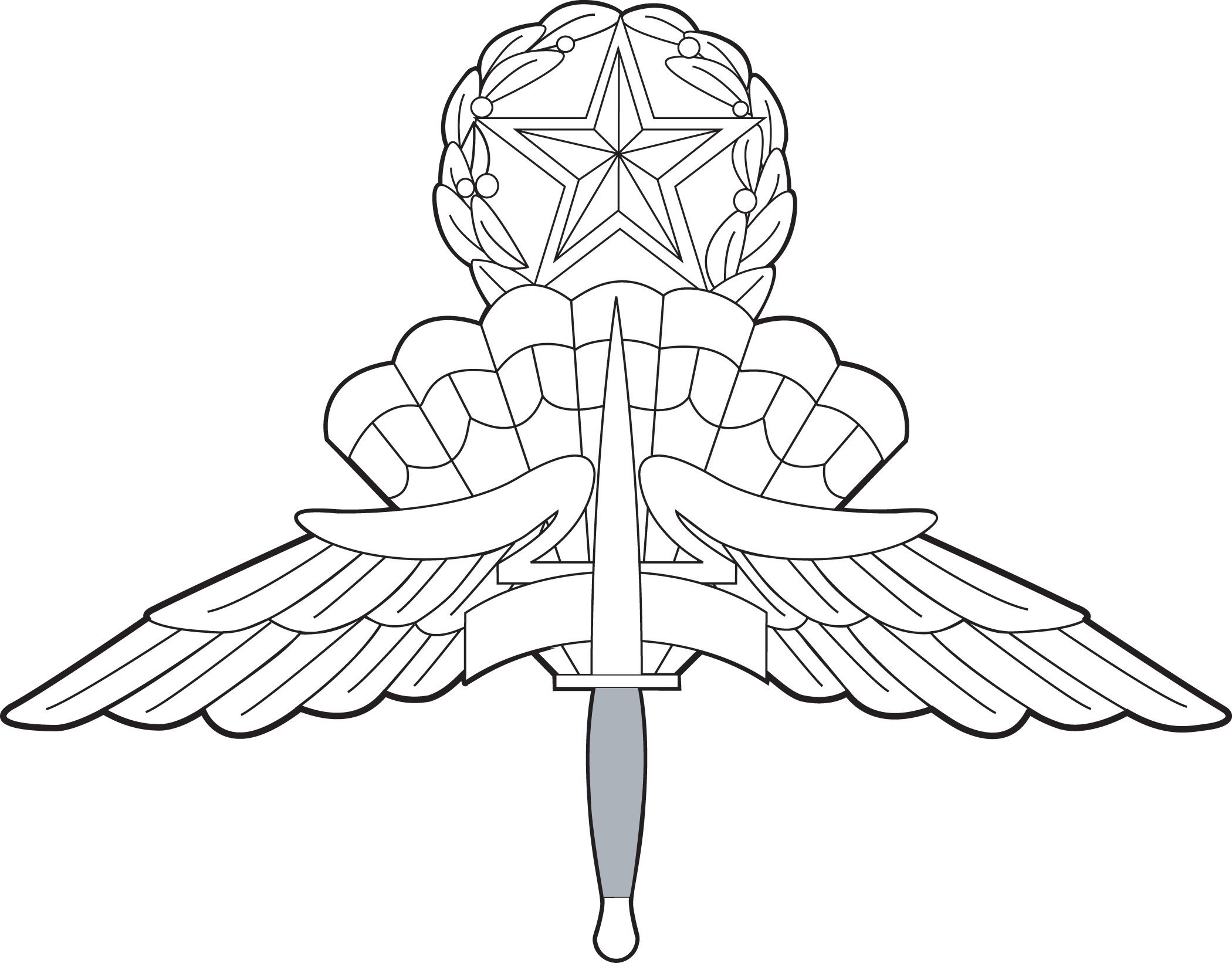

Badge	Combat Infantryman Badge			
Badge	Master Parachutist Badge with USSOCOM background trimming			
1st Row Awards	Defense Distinguished Service Medal w/ oak leaf cluster	Army Distinguished Service Medal w/ oak leaf cluster	Silver Star w/ oak leaf cluster	
2nd Row Awards	Defense Superior Service Medal	Legion of Merit w/ 3 oak leaf clusters	Distinguished Flying Cross w/ oak leaf cluster	Soldier's Medal
3rd Row Awards	Bronze Star w/ valor device & 1 Silver oak leaf cluster	Purple Heart	Defense Meritorious Service Medal	Meritorious Service Medal w/ 2 oak leaf cluster
4th Row Awards	Air Medal w/ valor device & numeral 9	Army Commendation Medal w/ valor device & 3 oak leaf clusters	Presidential Citizens Medal	National Defense Service Medal w/ 1 service stars
5th Row Awards	Armed Forces Expeditionary Medal	Vietnam Service Medal w/ 1 silver service star & 2 bronze service star	Southwest Asia Service Medal	Army Service Ribbon
6th Row Awards	Army Overseas Service Ribbon	Vietnam Gallantry Cross w/ 3 silver stars	Vietnam Campaign Medal w/ "60" Device	Kuwait Liberation Medal (Saudi Arabia)
Badge	Ranger Tab			
Badge	Pathfinder Badge		Jumpmaster Military Free Fall Parachute Badge	
Unit awards	Presidential Unit Citation	Joint Meritorious Unit Award w/ oak leaf cluster	Meritorious Unit Commendation	Vietnam Gallantry Cross Unit Citation

When Downing was a Major, he was awarded the Soldier’s Medal for actions of heroism not involving enemy contact while serving with the 25th Infantry Division in Vietnam.

Downing also earned the Vietnam Civil Actions Medal Unit Citation, French Parachutist Badge, 75th Ranger Regiment DUI and Secretary of Defense ID Badge. In 1971, he was reported to have also received the Distinguished Flying Cross with one oak leaf cluster for his service in Vietnam. Downing wore these decorations as a major general in 1988 but omitted them as a general.

== Civilian career ==
Downing was on the Board of Directors of SAIC and Chairman of the Special Projects Committee of the corporation.
