= Andrew Phillips (lawyer) =

American lawyer

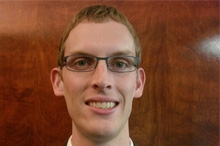
- Born: United States
- Education: Gallaudet University, UC Hastings, Juris Doctor
- Occupation: Lawyer

Andrew Phillips is a deaf lawyer, and an advocate for equal access.

== Early life ==
Andrew Phillips went to the California School for the Deaf (Fremont).

== Career ==
Phillips served as a Congressional Intern of U.S. Senator Barbara Boxer. After graduating Gallaudet Andrew did an internship with the Director of Policy / General Counsel at the National Council on Disability.

== Career ==
Andrew Phillips serves as policy counsel for the National Association of the Deaf (NAD).
