= Harry Craven Williams =

Welsh Anglican priest

Harry Craven Williams, MBE was a Welsh Anglican priest in the 20th century.

Williams was educated at the University of Wales and ordained in 1934. After a curacy at St Mary, Swansea he was a chaplain to the British Armed Forces during World War II. When peace returned he held incumbent at St Jude, Swansea then St Paul, Sketty. He was the Archdeacon of Gower from 1969 to 1979.
