= Richard William Davies =

Welsh Anglican priest

Richard William Payne Davies was a Welsh Anglican priest in the 19th century, the archdeacon of Brecon from 1859 to 1875; he succeeded Richard Davies, who had held the post for over 50 years.

Davies was born in Llangenny and educated at Worcester College, Oxford. He was ordained deacon in 1830, and priest in 1832. He was the incumbent at Llangasty.
