= Harold Williams (priest, died 1954) =

British priest and the Archdeacon of Gower in 1923-1954

Harold Stepney Williams (28 March 1864, Llanelly – 24 February 1954, Swansea) was a British priest, the Archdeacon of Gower from 1923 until his death.

Williams was educated at Durham University and ordained in 1888. After curacies in Bromborough, Tredegar and Swansea he was the incumbent at Oystermouth from 1898 until 1938.

Church in Wales titles
Preceded by Inaugural appointment	Archdeacon of Gower; 1923–1954	Succeeded by John James Absalom Thomas
