= David Thomas (rugby union) =

- Full name: David Leyshon Thomas
- Born: 27 March 1909 Neath, Wales
- Died: 28 September 1952 (aged 43) Neath, Wales
- Occupation: Harold Thomas (brother)

Rugby union career
- Position: Forward
International career
Years	Team	Apps	(Points)
1937	Wales	1	(0)

David Leyshon Thomas (27 March 1909 — 28 September 1952) was a Welsh international rugby union player.

Born in Neath, Thomas started his senior rugby career with Briton Ferry RFC, before transferring to Neath RFC. He was capped for Wales in a 1937 Home Nations match against England at Twickenham, partnering his brother Harold in the second row, then ascended to the captaincy of Neath for the 1937–38 season.

Thomas served with the Royal Air Force in World War II.

While working at Llandarcy Oil Refinery in 1952, Thomas suffered severe burns when gas cylinders exploded and died at his home a month later of his injuries, at the age of 43.

== See also ==
- List of Wales national rugby union players
