= Harold Williams (priest, died 2004) =

Welsh Anglican priest (1917–2004)

Harold Edgar Williams (1917–2004) was a Welsh Anglican priest in the 20th century.

Hughes was educated at St David's College, Lampeter and ordained in 1943. After curacies in Leytonstone and Barnes he was a chaplain in the RNVR from 1946 to 1948. When peace returned he was curate at St Jude, Swansea then a Royal Navy Chaplain from 1948 to 1951. He held incumbencies at Llansantffraed, Hay-on-Wye, Brynmawr and Newton, Swansea. He was the archdeacon of Brecon from 1983 to 1987.
