= Andrew Phillips (historian) =

British historian

Andrew Phillips BEM is an historian from the ancient borough of Colchester in Essex in the East of England.

He is a former lecturer in history at Colchester Institute. He was for 40 years a contributor of historical columns to the Essex County Standard and he is the author of Colchester: A History (ISBN 1-86077-304-4), Ten Men and Colchester (ISBN 978-0900360657), Colchester 1940-1990: A Changing Town (ISBN 0-7509-1301-0), Steam and the Road to Glory: The Paxman Story (ISBN 978-0952936015), Colchester in the Great War (ISBN 978-1-47386-061-2), Ellisons 1764-2014 Solicitors of Colchester (ISBN 978-1-909277-10-6), Paxman of Colchester: The Rise and Fall of a British Industry 1918-2022 (ISBN 978-0-9529360-3-9). He has written many Journal articles and chapters in other books and is the facilitator of the Colchester Recalled oral history project.

In The Queen's Birthday Honours List 2013, Phillips was awarded the British Empire Medal (BEM) "for services to history and heritage in Colchester".
