= David Thomas (Canadian scientist) =

Canadian biochemist

Academic background
- Education: PhD, 1970, University College London

David Y. Thomas is a Canadian biochemist. He is Chair of Biochemistry at McGill University. His research interests include cell signaling pathways and their role in infectious diseases and molecular chaperone systems in the endoplasmic reticulum.

== Career ==
Thomas completed his PhD in 1970 at University College London. In the 1990s, Thomas and John J. M. Bergeron discovered calnexin, an integral protein of the endoplasmic reticulum. In 1998, Thomas was elected a Fellow of the Royal Society of Canada.

In 2015, Thomas was renewed as a Tier 1 Canada Research Chair in Molecular Genetics.
