= Henry Warren Williams (1816–1877) =

Henry Warren Williams (January 20, 1816 – February 19, 1877) was an American jurist who was a justice of the Supreme Court of Pennsylvania from 1868 until his death in 1877.

== Early life ==
Williams was born on January 20, 1816, in Groton, Connecticut. He was one of ten children (four sons and six daughters) born on Warren and Elisabeth Stanton (Gallup) Williams. He prepared for college at the Bacon Academy and Plainfield Academy and graduated from Amherst College in 1837. Following his graduation, he spent one year as the principal of the Southwick Academy in Southwick, Massachusetts.

== Legal career ==
In 1838, he moved to Pittsburgh and studied law in the office of Walter H. Lowrie. He was admitted to the bar on May 24, 1841.

In 1851, Williams the Whig candidate for judge of the district court of Allegheny County, Pennsylvania. He defeated Democratic nominee Charles Shaler and was reelected without opposition in 1861. In 1867, Williams was the Republican nominee for the Supreme Court of Pennsylvania, but was defeated by George Sharswood by 927 votes. United States Senator John Scott recommended Williams to President Ulysses S. Grant for a seat on the United States Court of Appeals for the Third Circuit, but Williams declined it. From 1863 until his death, Williams was a professor of law at the Western University of Pennsylvania.

In August 1868, Governor John W. Geary appointed Williams to fill the vacancy on the Supreme Court of Pennsylvania caused by William Strong's appointment to the Supreme Court of the United States. He took office on October 26, 1868. In 1869, he was elected to a fifteen-year term.

== Personal life ==
In 1840, Williams joined the Third Presbyterian Church in Pittsburgh. From 1858 to 1874, he was an elder of the church. He was a member of the General Assembly of the New School Presbyterian Church in 1859, 1865, 1866, and 1867. In 1870, he played a role in resolving the Old School–New School controversy and reuniting the two branches of the Presbyterian Church.

On May 20, 1846, Williams married Lucy J. Stone of Petersburgh, New York. They had three sons and three daughters.

== Death ==
Williams died on February 19, 1877, in Pittsburgh. He was survived by his wife and five of his children. James P. Sterrett succeeded him on the Supreme Court.
