= Richard Davies (writer) =

English actor and writer

- Richard Davies and Lili Turkzadeh wedding photograph
- Born: Richard Davis
- Occupations: Actor, writer

Richard Davies (born Richard Davis) is an English actor and writer.

== Acting ==
As an actor, he is variously credited as Richard Davies, Richard A. Davies, and Richard L. Davies, and in the U.K. as Richard Hamilton. Hamilton is his mother's maiden name.

== Writing ==
Davies has self-published a play and two novels (one co-written with his wife, Lili Turkzadeh-Davies).
