= David A. Thomas (software developer) =

Canadian software developer researcher and entrepreneur

- Education: Bachelor of Electrical Engineering – Carleton University (1969), Master of Systems and Computer Engineering – Carleton University, (1976)
- Alma mater: Carleton University
- Occupations: Software developer, academic, CEO, investor, conference organizer

David A. Thomas, sometimes known as "Big" Dave Thomas is a software developer, researcher and entrepreneur. He was founder and CEO of Object Technology International, which created the products that became IBM VisualAge and eventually Eclipse.

He has taught and researched at universities in Canada and Australia, and advises R&D teams in big data and fast data, agile software development, and object technology. Thomas was the CEO and Chairman of YOW! conferences and workshops until the business was acquired by Skills Matter in 2020.

== Career ==
=== Carleton University ===
David A. Thomas completed a Bachelor of Electrical Engineering at Carleton University in Ottawa, Canada in 1969, and a Master of Systems and Computer Engineering there in 1976. From 1969, he has had a long history of involvement with computing services and research at Carleton, and was appointed an assistant professor and then a professor in 1990. To this day, Thomas is an adjunct professor at Carleton.

In 1984, Thomas started and led the Object Oriented Research Group at Carleton with colleagues Wilf LaLonde and John Pugh. The group created a range of tools for development in the Smalltalk language including ENVY/Smalltalk (an IDE), ENVY/Developer (a team programming and configuration management tool for Smalltalk) and Orwell (a revision control system).

=== Object Technology International ===
In 1988, Thomas founded the company Object Technology International, based in Ottawa, to commercialize the products. He was CEO of the company until its eventual acquisition. An early project was an embedded Smalltalk for Tektronix oscilloscopes, developed jointly with Tektronix, Digitalk, and the Canadian Department of National Defense. OTI were engaged to help create IBM's VisualAge Smalltalk. In 1996 OTI was acquired by IBM, and the VisualAge range became IBM products. VisualAge Java was the basis for the first release of the open source Eclipse IDE.

Thomas left IBM in 1998. He spent several years in academia at Carleton, and the Australian universities University of Queensland and Queensland University of Technology.

=== Agile, Big Data, Fast Data ===
Thomas has guided several startups in Big Data and Fast Data, including kx. His own R&D operation in Ottawa, Bedarra Labs, is now the R&D arm of First Derivatives plc, kx's parent company.

=== YOW conferences ===
Thomas was part of the organizing committees for OOPSLA, ECOOP, and the Danish Java and Object Oriented (JAOO) conferences for many years.

In 2008, he brought a conference much like JAOO to Australia. English speakers tended to spell out the acronym, while Danes and Germans pronounced the name "Yow". As the conference became less Java-oriented, the decision was made to remove all doubt and call it simply YOW. In Europe, JAOO was renamed GOTO conference in 2011.

There are now Yow conferences and other events every year in several Australian and Asian cities. The business was sold to Skills Matter in 2020, and then in 2022 YOW was acquired by Trifork, the organiser of the GOTO conferences in Europe.

== Awards ==
Thomas was awarded the title of Distinguished Engineer by the Association for Computing Machinery (ACM) in 2008.

== Publications ==
Smalltalk With Style Klimas, Edward J., Thomas, David A. and Skublics, Suzanne, Prentice Hall, NJ 1996 ISBN 9780131655492
