= Richard Davis (footballer) =

English footballer (born 1943)

Personal information
- Full name: Richard Frederick Davis
- Date of birth: 14 November 1943 (age 82)
- Place of birth: Plymouth, England
- Height: 5 ft 11 in (1.80 m)
- Position: Full-back

Youth career
- 1960–1961: Plymouth Argyle

Senior career*
Years	Team	Apps	(Gls)
1961–1964	Plymouth Argyle	23	(0)
1964–1965	Southampton	1	(0)
1965–1969	Bristol City	8	(0)
1969–1970	Barrow	50	(0)
1973–1976	Falmouth Town	185	(33)

Managerial career
- 1979–1981: Falmouth Town (player manager)
- * Club domestic league appearances and goals

Richard Frederick Davis (born 14 November 1943) is an English retired footballer who played as a full-back for various clubs in the 1960s.

== Football career ==
=== Plymouth Argyle ===
Davis was born in Plymouth, Devon and joined his local club, Plymouth Argyle as a trainee in August 1960, going on to sign as a professional a year later on his 18th birthday. Described as "a strongly built left-back", Davis made his first-team debut in a 3–2 defeat at Derby County on 20 Mar 1963. In his second match, Davis came up against Stanley Matthews of Stoke City, going down to another defeat. Despite being on the losing side in both his opening matches, Davis retained his place for the rest of the season.

He started the 1963–64 season playing six of the first eight games, before losing his place to Wilf Carter. After another five league matches between late-November and mid-January, of which four were defeats, Davis returned to the reserves, with the long-serving Bryce Fulton taking over at left-back. In his two seasons as a professional with Argyle, Davis made a total of 24 appearances.

=== Southampton ===
Davis joined fellow Second Division side Southampton in July 1964. He spent most of his time at The Dell in the reserves and made his solitary first-team appearance away to his former club on 17 February 1965, losing 4–0 as the "Saints" were "outplayed fore and aft" by Argyle, with Mike Trebilcock scoring twice.

=== Later career ===
Davis left Southampton in July 1965 to join Bristol City where he made only eight appearances in a four-year spell before joining Barrow in March 1969 where he made 50 appearances before dropping down to non-league football in the summer of 1970.

He played for Falmouth Town between 1973 and 1976 and had a second spell at the club, from 1979 to 1981, as a player manager. He later assisted Plymouth Argyle in their School of Excellence and was also a physical education teacher in Plymouth for over 20 years.
