= David A. Thomas (academic) =

American psychologist, expert on organizational behavior and academic administrator

David Thomas

12th President of Morehouse College
- In office January 1, 2018 – June 15, 2025
- Preceded by: John Wilson
- Succeeded by: F. DuBois Bowman

Personal details
- Born: David Anthony Thomas; September 26, 1956 (age 69) Kansas City, Missouri, U.S.
- Spouse: Wiletta Lewis
- Education: Yale University (BA, MPhil, PhD); Columbia University (MA)

David Anthony Thomas (born September 26, 1956) is an American psychologist, expert on organizational behavior, and academic administrator and most recently served as the 12th president of Morehouse College, a historically Black men's college in Atlanta. From 2017 to 2018, he was the H. Naylor Fitzhugh Professor of Business Administration at Harvard Business School. Thomas served at the Georgetown University McDonough School of Business as its Dean from 2011 to 2016 and as the William R. Berkley Chair and Professor of Management from 2016 to 2017.

Thomas was earlier a professor of business administration at Harvard University, from 1990 to 2011, where he rose to direct the school's Organizational Behavior Unit as the Fitzhugh chair from 2006 to 2011. He was a senior associate dean and director of faculty recruitment, there, from 2005 to 2008. Before joining the faculty at Harvard in 1990, Thomas was an assistant professor of management at the Wharton School of the University of Pennsylvania from 1986 to 1990.

== Early life ==
Thomas was born and raised in Kansas City, Missouri, where he attended Paseo Academy. In high school, Thomas studied abroad in France. He earned his Bachelor of Arts in administrative sciences from Yale University, graduating in 1978. Thomas then earned a master's degree in organizational psychology from Columbia University in 1981 and returned to Yale to earn his Master of Philosophy in 1984 and his Doctor of Philosophy in 1986. When he was applying for undergraduate studies, he wanted to go to Morehouse College and was accepted, but instead chose Yale, where he was able to receive financial aid.

== Career ==
=== Early years ===
After earning his doctorate in 1986, Thomas was hired as an assistant professor of management at the Wharton School of the University of Pennsylvania in Philadelphia. Upon his appointment, he was awarded the title of Atlantic Richfield Foundation Term Assistant Professor of Human Resource Management. He held both of these teaching and research positions until 1990 when he moved to Harvard Business School.

=== Harvard University ===
In 1990, Thomas began as an assistant professor at Harvard Business School and by 1993 was promoted to associate professor of business administration. In 1999 he served for one year as professor of business administration until he was awarded the title H. Naylor Fitzhugh Professor of Business Administration. He held this title until 2011, when he left Harvard to join the McDonough School of Business at Georgetown University as dean. In 2005, Harvard also appointed him senior associate dean, director of faculty recruiting, and in 2006 he was appointed as unit head of Harvard's Organizational Behavior Unit.

=== Georgetown University ===
In 2011, Thomas joined Georgetown University as dean of the McDonough School of Business. During his time at Georgetown, he merged the administration of the full-time and evening MBA programs, redesigned the curriculum, and launched a new Master of Science in finance online degree program. He also started a number of new collaborations for the school including a summer internship on entrepreneurship with ESADE in Spain. The newly designed MBA curriculum focuses on breaking down silos between subject areas and is a more integrative approach to education. It is also focused on the global nature of business, which is one of the five strategic themes Thomas has set for the school.

In addition, Thomas expanded the evening MBA program to Tysons Corner, Virginia, launched a global business initiative, and recruited a diverse set of new faculty.

David Thomas set five strategic themes for the McDonough School of Business after he arrived in 2011. (1) Provide a transformational educational experience for students. (2) Be in service to business and society. (3) Embrace global in everything the school does. (4) Excellence in research to impact practice. (5) Develop a community of philanthropic leadership to support the school.

== Research ==
David Thomas has researched and written extensively on diversity within organizations, executive development and higher education Dr. Thomas has co-authored two books: Breaking Through: The Making of Minority Executives in Corporate America (Harvard Business Press, 1999) and Leading for Equity: The Pursuit of Excellence in Montgomery County (Harvard Education Press, 2009), and written more than 60 case studies and articles for academic journals and others publications.

== Archives and records ==
- David A. Thomas papers at Baker Library Special Collections, Harvard Business School
