= Richard Gary Davis =

- Military career
- Awards: Soldier's Medal

Richard Gary Davis was awarded the Soldier's Medal, the Army's highest honor for heroism not involving actual conflict with an enemy, for an action in the Republic of Vietnam on 14 May 1967.

While serving as a helicopter door gunner, he was helping load and arm sixty Mk.IV aerial flares into a helicopter at a fueling station at Chu Lai, Vietnam. Noticing that one of the flares had fused, he retrieved it and ran with it across a taxiway and threw it into a safe area. Had it ignited in the helicopter the flare would have ignited the other flares and subsequently the thousands of gallons of fuel at the fuel farm.

After serving in the Army, Davis had a long career as a pilot, flight instructor and pilot evaluator, eventually retiring from Avianca in Colombia as an instructor/check airman on the Fokker 100 aircraft.

Davis has been recognized by the Federal Aviation Administration by inclusion in the prestigious Airman Certification Database.
