= H. R. Williams =

American novelist

H. R. Williams (born in Marianna, Arkansas), is an American writer.

Harold Ray Williams grew up near Crowley's Ridge, a line of hills running north to south along the eastern side of Arkansas, which features in his novels and in much of his short fiction and essays. He now lives and writes in Trumann, Arkansas, itself close to the Ridge.

Williams, who began writing novels in 2007, is active in national conferences and seminars. Husband to Nora Lee, he is the father of four children, and the grandfather of six.

== Published works ==
=== Books ===
- Harris: The Return of the Gunfighter (Treble Heart Books, 2007)
- The Whiskey Killing (Five Star/Thomson Gale, 2008)
- Crowley's Ridge: Collected Stories of H. R. Williams (Treble Heart Books, 2011)

=== Short stories ===
- "Shaker Mose", Aim Magazine
- "Glenda", True Confessions
- "Golden", Dog Fancy and The Cynic Online Magazine in 2008
- "The Children's Orchard", Night Terrors Publications and The Cynic Online Magazine in 2009
- "I Can't Get It Out Of My Head"m Madison Publishing Company
- "People Change", Monsters From Memphis - An Anthology
- "There's a Basement in the Arcade", Southern Voices - Radio Recordings and The Cynic Online Magazine in 2009
- "The Last Day of February", Woman's World Magazine
- "Abigail and the Horse", Woman's World Magazine
- "Black -Eyed Peas", Woman's World Magazine
- "Farewell Tennessee", Bibliophile Publishing Company
- "The Visitor", Grain Literary Magazine and The Cynic Online Magazine in 2010
- "The Ridge and the Town", The Iconoclast

=== Essays ===
- "Running Traps On Hornor's Nook", Memphis Magazine
- "The Hunter", Safari Magazine
- "Supper For the Dead", Montcalm Publications
- "The Trot Line", Montcalm Publications
- "Shanging", Montcalm Publications
- "The Tom", Montcalm Publications
- "Jump", Montcalm Publications
- "Jugging With Bubba", Montcalm Publications
- "The Dangerous Relative", Montcalm Publications
- "Bushytails", The American Hunter
- "Across the Levee", The American Hunter

== Awards ==
- First Prize – National League of American PEN Women – The Whiskey Killing
- First Prize – Mid-South Writer's Association – The Children's Orchard
- First Prize – Mid-South Writer's Association – Paddy's Peaches
