= David and Tonya Thomas =

American chefs, restaurateurs, and food historians

David and Tonya Thomas are American chefs, restaurateurs, and food historians who work in Baltimore, Maryland. The couple has owned several restaurants.

David Thomas won a 2018 episode of the television food competition series Chopped and then won a 5-part "Champs Challenge" series in 2020.

== Early life ==
David Thomas was born in Baltimore and raised in Jamaica, Queens, New York. His grandmother is Blackfoot and Thomas spent weekends at her 13-acre farm in Howard County, Maryland.

== Career ==
The Thomases opened Ida B.'s Table in 2017, naming it for activist and journalist Ida B. Wells, in a building that also houses The Real News Network, a non-profit that is an investor in the restaurant. The couple had originally planned a "reinvented, elevated" soul food restaurant, but after meeting with Jessica B. Harris, who asked them, "What makes you think soul food needs to be reinvented or elevated?", they refocused on a concept of "African-American cuisine informed by its history." The restaurant is in downtown Baltimore on Holliday Street. In early 2020 they left the restaurant.

Previously they owned Herb & Soul, a farm-to-table restaurant in the Parkville neighborhood of Baltimore.

In 2017 the couple were featured in an episode of Heritage Radio Network's A Hungry Society. In 2018 David Thomas was featured at the James Beard Foundation's Juneteenth event.

In November 2018 David Thomas won a Thanksgiving-themed episode of Chopped. He prepared a butternut squash soup macaroni-and-cheese with spinach and liver, turkey breast with spoonbread, cracklings, and gravy, and a spoonbread pie with cranberry-and-port whipped cream. In February 2020 Thomas won a "Champs Challenge" series, competing with 15 other chefs.

In November 2020 the couple opened H3irloom Food Group, initially focussing on catering. The couple produces a recurring dinner series.

== Philanthropy ==
The Thomases work with the American Institute of Wine and Food's Days of Taste program, which brings chefs into elementary schools.
