= Andrew Phillips (priest) =

Andrew Phillips was a Welsh Anglican priest.

Phillips was educated at the University of Oxford. He held livings at Llangathen, Christchurch and Coity. He was the Archdeacon of Brecon from 1578 to 1620.
