= Jeffrey J. Schloesser =

United States general

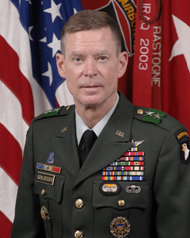
- Military career
- Allegiance: United States
- Branch: United States Army
- Service years: 1976–2010
- Rank: Major General
- Commands: 101st Airborne Division; 12th Aviation Brigade
- Conflicts: Iraq War; War in Afghanistan
- Awards: Army Distinguished Service Medal; Defense Superior Service Medal (2); Legion of Merit (2); Bronze Star Medal

Jeffrey J. Schloesser is a retired major general and the former President of Aviation Worldwide Services (AAR CORP). He currently is Executive Vice President for Bell.

Schloesser retired from the army in August 2010 as the Director of Army Aviation, Office of the Deputy Chief of Staff, G3/5/7. He was a former commanding general of the 101st Airborne Division and Fort Campbell, Kentucky. Schloesser led the 101st/Combined Joint Task Force-101 in Afghanistan from April 2008 to June 2009 in support of Operation Enduring Freedom. This command was the fifth time Schloesser had served at Fort Campbell during his army career.

== Military career ==
Schloesser enlisted in the United States Army in 1976 and was commissioned an officer into the Army after attending Officer Candidate School in 1977. He first served as a platoon leader of B Company of the 293rd Combat Engineer Battalion (Heavy) in Baumholder, Germany. He continued to serve as an Engineer, Army Aviator, Middle East Foreign area officer, Special Operations Aviator, and Army Strategist. He commanded Bravo Company, 2 Battalion, 501st AVN in Camp Humphries, South Korea. Next he commanded the 1st and 2nd Special Operations Aviation Battalions (both of the 160th Special Operations Aviation Regiment) and 12th Aviation Brigade (V Corps). Schloesser served in Germany, South Korea, Jordan, and Kuwait, as well as commanding deployed task forces in Haiti, Albania, Kosovo, Iraq, and Afghanistan. He also served as a Political Military Officer at the United States Department of State.

In August 2000 Schloesser was assigned as Chief, Office of Military Cooperation, Kuwait, United States Central Command. In October 2001 he started and became the first Chief, War on Terrorism Strategic Planning Cell, J-5, the Joint Staff. During Operation Iraqi Freedom (June 2003 – June 2004), he served as Assistant Division Commander (Support), 101st Airborne Division (Air Assault). From July 2004 until July 2005 Schloesser was Director, Army Aviation Task Force, Headquarters, Department of the Army. Schloesser most recently served as Deputy Director for Strategic Operational Planning, National Counterterrorism Center, from July 2005 to November 2006, when he took command of the 101st Airborne Division. He retired in 2010.

=== Education and training ===
Schloesser received a Bachelor of Arts degree in political science, philosophy and geography from the University of Kansas and an MSFS degree in Foreign Service from Georgetown University School of Foreign Service. He was a Senior Service College Fellow at the John F. Kennedy School of Government, Harvard University. Schloesser graduated from Officer Candidate School in 1977. Schloesser is also a student of Arabic, German, and French.

== Awards and decorations ==
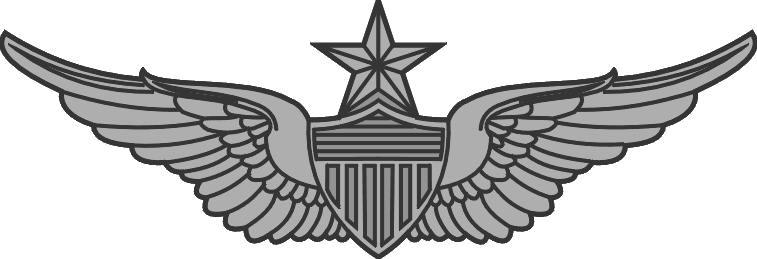
Senior Army Aviator Badge
Basic Parachutist Badge
Air Assault Badge
Joint Chiefs of Staff Identification Badge
Army Staff Identification Badge
Unidentified Distinctive Unit Insignia

Army Distinguished Service Medal
Defense Superior Service Medal with one bronze oak leaf cluster
Legion of Merit with oak leaf cluster
Bronze Star
Meritorious Service Medal with four oak leaf clusters
Air Medal
Joint Service Commendation Medal with oak leaf cluster
Army Commendation Medal with oak leaf cluster
Joint Meritorious Unit Award with two oak leaf clusters
National Defense Service Medal with one bronze service star
Armed Forces Expeditionary Medal with service star
Kosovo Campaign Medal with two service stars
Afghanistan Campaign Medal
Iraq Campaign Medal
Global War on Terrorism Service Medal
Korea Defense Service Medal
Armed Forces Reserve Medal
Army Service Ribbon
Army Overseas Service Ribbon with bronze award numeral ?
NATO Medal for service with ISAF

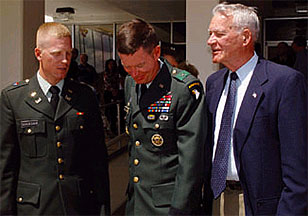
Ryan Schloesser (left) with his father, Major General Jeffrey Schloesser (center; then a Brigadier General), and his grandfather, retired Lieutenant Colonel Kenneth Schloesser (right), at his Officer Candidate School graduation in 2004

== Personal life ==
Schloesser is the son of retired United States Army Armor Lieutenant Colonel Kenneth Schloesser. Jeffrey Schloesser and his wife, Patty (née Drysdale), also a Kansas graduate, have one son, Ryan—in the United States Army—and one daughter, Kelly, a former Public Affairs Officer for the United States Army and current consultant.

Schloesser is the author of Marathon War - Leadership in Combat in Afghanistan, to be published in May 2021.

== Quotes ==
"Are we losing this war? Absolutely no way. Can the enemy win it? Absolutely no way. The Afghans won't allow -- and the Afghan National Army is well beyond that already" - DOD News Briefing in Afghanistan, 9/5/2008.

"The Afghan Army never had a chance against the Taliban" - 8/19/2021.
