= David Thomas (archdeacon of Gower) =

Welsh Anglican priest (1897–1971)

David Martin Luther Thomas (3 September 1897 - 26 June 1971) was a Welsh Anglican priest, and the Archdeacon of Brecon from 1959 to 1969.

Thomas was educated at St David's College, Lampeter. After curacies at Swansea, Knighton and Llansamlet he held incumbencies at Llangammarch then St Barnabas, Swansea from 1935. He was treasurer of Brecon Cathedral from 1958 to 1959.
