= Dick Davies =

American basketball player (1936–2012)

Personal information
- Born: January 21, 1936 Harrisburg, Pennsylvania, U.S.
- Died: February 25, 2012 (aged 76) Loudon, Tennessee, U.S.
- Listed height: 6 ft 1 in (1.85 m)
- Listed weight: 176 lb (80 kg)

Career information
- High school: John Harris (Harrisburg, Pennsylvania)
- College: LSU (1958–1960)
- NBA draft: 1960: 11th round, 79th overall pick
- Drafted by: St. Louis Hawks
- Position: Guard

Career history
- 1960–?: Akron Goodyear Wingfoots
- Stats at Basketball Reference
Medals
Men's basketball
Representing United States
Olympic Games
Gold medal – first place	1964 Tokyo	United States

Richard Allan Davies (January 21, 1936 – February 25, 2012) was an American basketball player. He played for the gold medal-winning United States men's national basketball team at the 1964 Summer Olympics. He is also the youngest brother of Bob Davies, who was inducted into the Naismith Memorial Basketball Hall of Fame as a player in 1970.

Davies was born and raised in Harrisburg, Pennsylvania and attended John Harris High School. He then attended Gettysburg College and played freshman basketball for his brother, who was the coach at the time, before transferring to Louisiana State University (LSU) where he lettered for two seasons.

Standing at 6 ft 1 in (1.85 m) and weighing 176 pounds (80 kg), Davies played the guard position. He was captain of LSU for one season, and in 1960 was selected by the St. Louis Hawks in the 11th round of the NBA draft with the 79th pick overall. Despite his late-round selection, Davies opted to play in the Amateur Athletic Union for the Akron Goodyear Wingfoots. He was selected to represent the United States in the 1964 Summer Olympics, one in which they went 9–0 and won the gold medal. Davies averaged 3.4 points per game, and his personal tournament-high was 12 points in the opening game against South Korea.

The following season, Boston Celtics' head coach Red Auerbach invited him to play in their summer camp, followed by an offer to play in the preseason for a chance to make the roster. Davies declined in order to maintain his amateur status and played for the Wingfoots while working for company as well. He eventually became a vice-president for Goodyear Tire and Rubber Company.

Dick Davies holds the rare distinction having played for four coaches who are now in the Naismith Memorial Basketball Hall of Fame: Red Auerbach at the 1964 Boston Celtics summer league; Hank Iba at the 1964 Summer Olympics; John McLendon for the eight game Olympics "prep tour"; and Bob Davies at Gettysburg College.

On February 25, 2012, Davies died from a heart attack. He was 76. At the time of his death Davies resided in Loudon, east of Knoxville, Tennessee.

Dick Davies was the father of Bob (Bobby) Davies, who briefly played basketball for Vanderbilt, and the uncle of actor Eddie Frierson.
