= Alan Jevons =

The Venerable Alan Jevons

Archdeacon of Brecon
- Incumbent
- Assumed office 2013

Personal details
- Born: 1956 (age 69–70) Bournemouth
- Spouse: Susan Jevons
- Children: 2
- Education: University of Exeter; Ridley Hall, Cambridge

Alan Neil Jevons (b 1956) is a Church in Wales priest: he has been Archdeacon of Brecon since 2013.

He was born in Bournemouth and educated at the University of Exeter and Ridley Hall, Cambridge. He was made deacon at Petertide 1981 (28 June) and ordained priest the following Petertide (27 June 1982) — both times by Philip Goodrich, Bishop of Worcester, at Worcester Cathedral. After curacies in Halesowen and Heywood he was Team Vicar of Hereford from 1987 to 1993. He was at Much Birch from 1993 until 2002; and Tenbury Wells from 2002 until 2007. He was Vicar of Llyn Syfaddan from 2007 until 2015; and Social Responsibility Officer for the Diocese of Swansea and Brecon from 2007 until his appointment as Archdeacon. He was collated Archdeacon of Brecon at Brecon Cathedral on 17 February 2013.
