= Owain Jones (priest) =

Owain William Jones (9 September 1921 – February 1995) was a Welsh Anglican priest.

Jones was born in Merthyr Tydfil in 1921 and educated at Selwyn College, Cambridge. He was ordained deacon in 1938, and priest in 1939. After a curacy in Roath he was chaplain at St Michael's College, Llandaff. Jones was Warden of Church Hostel, Bangor and a lecturer at the University of Wales from 1957 to 1962. He held incumbencies at Builth and Newbridge-on-Wye. He was Archdeacon of Brecon from 1979 until 1987; and archdeacon of Gower from 1987 to 1989.
