= Peter Brooks (priest) =

Welsh Anglican priest

Peter Brooks (born 1955) is a Welsh Anglican priest: since 2022, and was formerly the Archdeacon with responsibility for Ministry Areas in the Diocese of Swansea and Brecon.

After a career in the retail sector, he trained for ordination at St Michael's College, Llandaff. He was made deacon at Petertide 1999 (27 June) — by Anthony Pierce, Bishop of Swansea and Brecon, at Brecon Cathedral — and priest on 24 June 2000, beginning his career with a curacy at Morriston. He has held incumbencies at Rhayader, and Three Cliffs in the Gower Peninsula. He was collated as Archdeacon on 17 December 2022 at Brecon Cathedral.
