= Jonathan Davies (Welsh priest) =

Welsh priest

Jonathan Byron Davies (born 14 September 1969) is a Welsh Anglican priest. He has served as the Vicar of Llwynderw in the Diocese of Swansea and Brecon, Church in Wales since September 2015, and as the Archdeacon of Gower since September 2016.

Davies studied theology at University of Wales, Cardiff, graduating with a Bachelor of Theology (BTh) degree in 1995, and trained for ordination at St Michael's College, Llandaff. He was ordained in the Church in Wales: made deacon at Petertide 1996 (29 June) — by Huw Jones, Bishop of St Davids, at St Davids Cathedral — and ordained priest the following Petertide (28 June 1997) — by David Thomas, the provincial assistant bishop, at Ammanford (i.e. Davies' title parish). He was collated archdeacon on 25 September 2016.
