= Brian James (priest) =

Brian James (1936 - 2013) was a Church in Wales priest, most notably Archdeacon of Brecon from 1994 until 1999.

He was educated at St. Michael's College, Llandaff and ordained in 1958. After curacies in Llandeilo and Swansea he was Vicar of Brwyngwyn from 1963 to 1970. He was at Llansantffraed from 1970 until 1979; and Ilston from 1979 until 1994.

Church in Wales titles
Preceded by Wynford Rees	Archdeacon of Brecon; 1994–1999	Succeeded by Elwyn Crebey John
