= Soldier's Medal =

United States Army heroism award

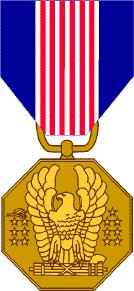
- Type: Military medal
- Awarded for: Distinguishing oneself by heroism not involving actual conflict with an enemy
- Presented by: United States Department of the Army
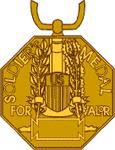
- Reverse
- Status: Currently awarded
- Established: 2 July 1926
- First award: October 17, 1927
- Service ribbon

Precedence
- Next (higher): Distinguished Flying Cross
- Equivalent: Naval Service: Navy and Marine Corps Medal; Air and Space Forces: Airman's Medal; Coast Guard: Coast Guard Medal
- Next (lower): Bronze Star Medal

The Soldier's Medal is an individual decoration of the United States Army. It was introduced as Section 11 of the Air Corps Act, passed by the Congress of the United States on July 2, 1926. The Soldier's Medal is equivalent to the Navy and Marine Corps Medal, the Air and Space Forces' Airman's Medal, and the Coast Guard Medal. Prior to the creation of the Airman's Medal in 1960, airmen were awarded the Soldier's Medal.

The criteria for the medal are: "The Soldier's Medal is awarded to any person of the Armed Forces of the United States or of a friendly foreign nation who, while serving in any capacity with the Army of the United States, including Reserve Component soldiers not serving in a duty status at the time of the heroic act, distinguished himself or herself by heroism not involving conflict with an enemy."

== History ==
A need to recognize acts of heroism in 1922 resulted in the War Department's issuing orders for acts of bravery during peacetime. This led to an Act of Congress (Public Law 446-69th Congress, July 2, 1926 (44 Stat. 780)) which established the Soldier's Medal for acts of heroism not involving actual conflict with an enemy. The Secretary of War directed that the Quartermaster General prepare and submit appropriate designs of the Soldier's Medal per letter signed by the Adjutant General dated 11 August 1926. The medal was designed by sculptor Gaetano Cecere.

The first Soldier's Medals were awarded on October 17, 1927, to John F. Burns and James P. Martin for their heroism during a fire and to James K. Wilson and Cleophas C. Burnett for saving people from drowning.

The period of time when the most Soldier's Medals were awarded was World War II (at least hundreds were awarded).

Prior to the establishment of the Airman's Medal, which was authorized on 10 August 1956 and created in 1960, the Soldier's Medal was awarded to U.S. Air Force personnel by the Army since 26 September 1947.

== Criteria ==
The distinguishing criterion for awarding the Soldier's Medal, per Army Regulation 600–8–22, para 3–14, is "The performance must have involved personal hazard or danger and the voluntary risk of life under conditions not involving conflict with an armed enemy. Awards will not be made solely on the basis of having saved a life." It is the highest honor a soldier can receive for an act of valor in a non-combat situation, held to be equal to or greater than the level which would have justified an award of the Distinguished Flying Cross had the act occurred in combat. Any enlisted American servicemember who is eligible for retirement pay will receive an increase of 10 percent in retirement pay if the level of valor was equal to that which would earn the Distinguished Service Cross. Additional awards of the medal are denoted by oak leaf clusters worn on the suspension and service ribbon of the medal.

== Appearance ==
The Soldier's Medal is issued as a 1 3/8 inch wide Bronze octagon with an eagle displayed, standing on a fasces, between two groups of stars of six and seven, above the group of six a spray of leaves. On the reverse is a shield paly of 13 pieces, on the chief the letters "US," supported by sprays of laurel and oak, around the upper edge the inscription "SOLDIER'S MEDAL" and across the face the words "FOR VALOR". In the base is a panel for the name of the recipient to be engraved. The medal is suspended from the ribbon by a rectangular-shaped metal loop with corners rounded.

The ribbon is 1 3/8 inches wide and consists of the following stripes: 3/8 inch Ultramarine Blue 67118 on each side and the center containing 13 White and Red stripes of equal width (7 White 67101 and 6 Old Glory Red 67156).

== Notable recipients ==
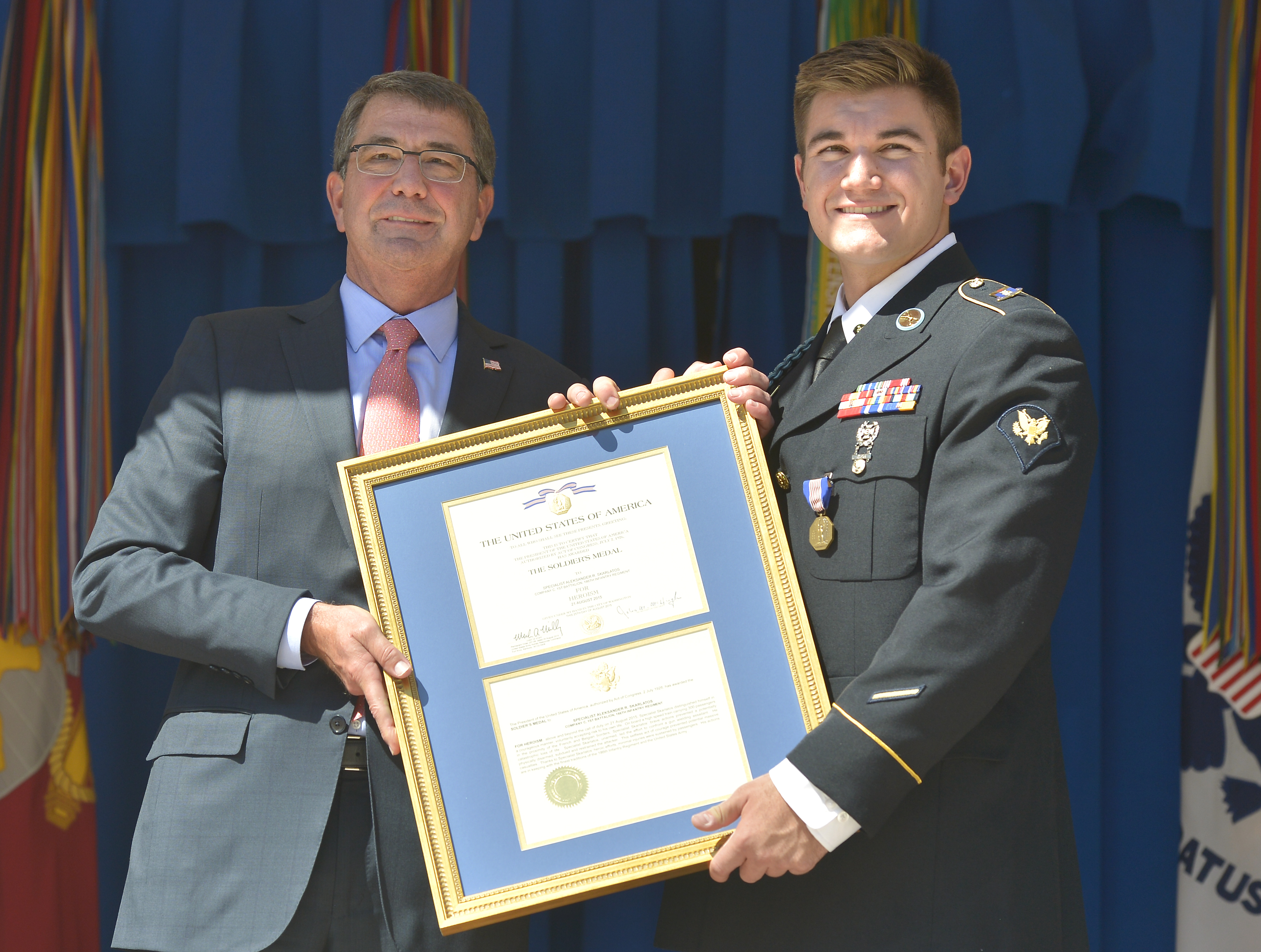
U.S. Secretary of Defense Ash Carter presents the Soldier's Medal to Alek Skarlatos on September 17, 2015.

- Marty Allen, USAAF, was awarded the Soldier's Medal for bravery during a plane fire.
- Aaron Bank, a United States Army officer who founded the United States Army Special Forces (commonly known as the Green Berets).
- Joseph P. Cleland, for rescuing a drowning aviator off Bougainville Island in 1943.
- Wayne A. Downing, was a US Army retired four-star General who has held command of the 75th Ranger Regiment, United States Army Special Operations Command, Joint Special Operations Command and United States Special Operations Command.
- Edith Ellen Greenwood of the U.S. Army Nurse Corps (ANC) during World War II for saving fifteen patients.
- Patrick John Hessian of the United States Army Chaplain Corps (USACC) for disarming a suicidal soldier who was holding a grenade.
- John D. Hoffman for bravery in saving others after an explosion at a Manhattan Project plant.
- Otto Kerner Jr., US Army, was awarded the Soldier's Medal for rescuing a drowning soldier off the coast of Sicily.
- Kilma S. Lattin, US Army, and former Executive Tribal Council Member of the Pala Band of Mission Indians was awarded the Soldier's Medal for Valor for rescuing a woman engulfed in flames. He repeatedly sustained injuries while using his body to extinguish the fire, and saved the woman's life.
- Henry Mucci, US Army, was awarded the Soldier's Medal for rescuing a soldier in danger of drowning in 1943.
- Colin Powell, who was injured in a Vietnam War helicopter crash and rescued three comrades from the burning wreckage, including his division commander Charles M. Gettys, division chief of staff Jack L. Treadwell, and Gettys's aide-de-camp, Ron Tumelson.
- Alek Skarlatos was awarded the Soldier's Medal after thwarting a terrorist attack on a train in France.
- Christopher Speer, a former member of the United States Army Special Forces and Delta Force. Awarded the Soldier's Medal for risking his life to save two Afghan children trapped in a minefield on July 21, 2002. Two weeks later he died at Ramstein Air Base following a head wound caused by an enemy grenade thrown during a firefight.
- Hugh Thompson Jr., Lawrence Colburn, and Glenn Andreotta were awarded the Soldier's Medal for their intervention in the My Lai Massacre (1968), which included threatening to fire on their own comrades if they did not stop the killings.
- Brad Wenstrup, an Ohio congressman, an Army Reserve colonel, and Iraq war veteran, was awarded the Soldier's Medal for his actions during the 2017 shooting at a congressional baseball team practice.
- Samuel Tankersley Williams, for supervising the evacuation of the transport ship Susan B. Anthony after it struck a mine off the coast of France during Operation Overlord in June 1944.

== See also ==
- Awards and decorations of the United States Armed Forces
- Awards and decorations of the United States Army
- List of military decorations
- List of Soldier's Medal recipients
