= Archdeacon of Brecon =

The Archdeacon of Brecon is a senior ecclesiastical officer in the Church in Wales Diocese of Swansea and Brecon. The archdeacon is the senior priest with responsibility over the area of the archdeaconry of Brecon, which comprises the five rural deaneries of Brecon, Builth, Crickhowell, Hay and Maelienydd.

== History ==
The first recorded archdeacons of Brecon occur soon after the Norman Conquest in the Diocese of St David's, based in a fortified palace at Llan-ddew. However, no territorial titles are recorded until after c. 1125. Following the disestablishment of the Church in Wales in 1920, the Archdeaconry of Brecon was separated from St David's diocese in 1923 to become the new Diocese of Swansea and Brecon, and subdivided into the present two archdeaconries of Brecon (redefined) and Gower.

== List of archdeacons of Brecon ==
- 1115–1120 Elias
- 1120–1148 Jordan
- 1174–1176 Gerald of Wales (de Barri)
- 1203–1208 Gerald de Barri (the younger)
- 1253 John
- 1259 Roger of Christchurch
- 1274 John de Fecham
- 1274 Henry de Villa Amlof
- 1278–1303 Adam Bareth
- 1328 Philip ap Hywel
- 1345, 1366 Gruffudd ap Rhys
- 1389–1408 Morgan ab Einion
- 1408 Richard Gyldesford
- 1408–? Roger Stafford
- 1437–1456 David Chirbury (previously Bishop of Dromore, 1431)
- 1504–1523 William Walter
- 1523–1534 Richard Fetherston (hung, drawn and quartered for papacy, 1540)
- 1534-1544 Richard Gwent
- 1554–1559 John Blaxton
- 1559–1560 George Constantine
- 1560–? William Downham
- 1567-? William Blethyn (died 1590; also Bishop of Llandaff, 1575)
- 1578-1620 Andrew Phillips
- 1620 Isaac Singleton
- 1643–1671 William Nicholson (also Bishop of Gloucester, 1660)
- 1671–1704 Timothy Halton (also Archdeacon of Oxford, 1675)
- ?1704–1708 Roger Griffith
- 1708–1736 Joseph Stephens
- c. 1720 Richard Davies
- 1736–1759 Thomas Payn
- 1759–1763 Thomas Eynon
- 1763–1805 Edward Edwards
- 1805–1859 Richard Davies (the younger)
- 1859–1875 Richard William Davies
- 1875–1895 Henry de Winton
- 1895–1907 (ret.): William Bevan (father of Edward)
- 1907–1923 (res.): Edward Bevan (afterwards Suffragan Bishop of Swansea, 1915)

1923: Archdeaconry redefined as part of the Diocese of Swansea and Brecon

- 1923–1939 (ret.): Henry Church Jones
- 1939–1947 (ret.): Henry Stewart
- 1947–1955: Richard Cole-Hamilton
- 1955–1969 (ret.): William Wilkinson
- 1969–1978 (ret.): Thomas Griffiths
- 1979–1987 (res.): Owain Jones (afterwards Archdeacon of Gower, 1987)
- 1987–1994 (ret.): Wynford Rees
- 1994–1999 (res.): Brian James
- 1999–2003 (ret.): Elwyn John
- 2003–2013 (ret.): Randolph Thomas
- 2013–present: Alan Jevons
